= Sam Houston Bearkats football statistical leaders =

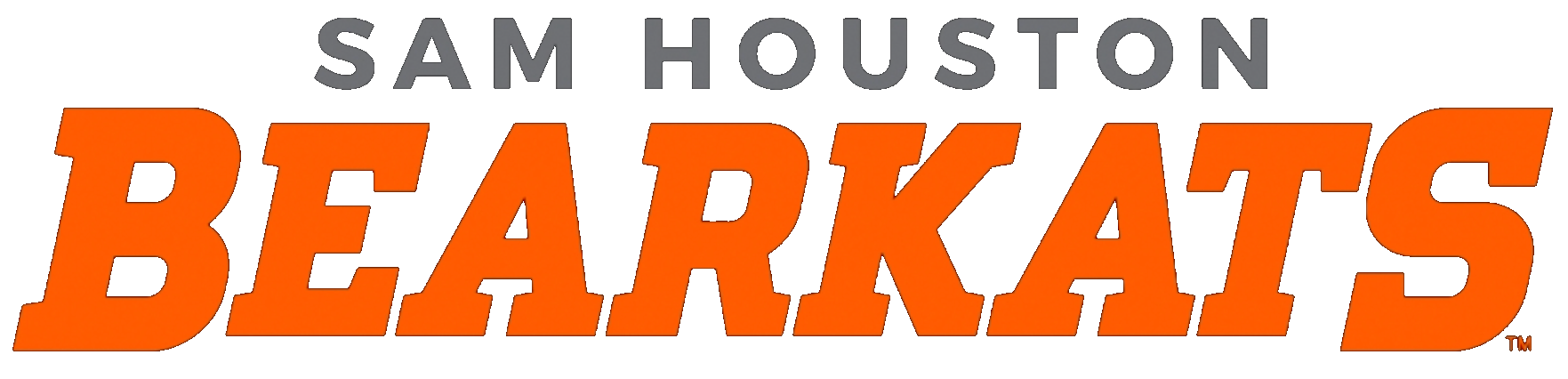

The Sam Houston Bearkats football statistical leaders are individual statistical leaders of the Sam Houston Bearkats program in various categories, including passing, rushing, receiving, total offense, defensive stats, and kicking. Within those areas, the lists identify single-game, single-season, and career leaders. The Bearkats currently represent Sam Houston State University in the NCAA Division I FBS Conference USA (CUSA).

Although Sam Houston began competing in intercollegiate football in 1912, the school's official record book considers the "modern era" to have begun in 1950. Records from before this year are often incomplete and inconsistent, and they are generally not included in these lists.

Recordkeeping notes:

- From 1986 through 2022, Sam Houston played in the second level of Division I football, currently known as Division I FCS (known before the 2006 season as Division I-AA). Official NCAA season and career statistical totals do not include statistics recorded in I-AA/FCS playoff games before 2002, and most programs that played in FCS before 2002 follow this practice.
- Since 1950, seasons in the top level of college football, now known as Division I FBS, have increased from 10 games to 11 and then 12 games in length.
- While FCS regular seasons were normally limited to 11 games before a permanent expansion to 12 in 2026, NCAA rules allowed FCS teams to schedule 12 regular-season games in years when the period starting with the Thursday before Labor Day and ending with the final Saturday in November contains 14 Saturdays.
- CUSA has held a championship game since 2005, but Sam Houston has yet to play in it.
- The NCAA didn't allow freshmen to play varsity football until 1972 (with the exception of the World War II years), allowing players to have four-year careers.
- Due to COVID-19 issues, the NCAA ruled that the 2020 season would not count against the athletic eligibility of any football player, giving everyone who played in that season the opportunity for five years of eligibility instead of the normal four.
- From 2018 through 2025, players in both FBS and FCS were allowed to participate in as many as four games in a redshirt season; previously, playing in even one game "burned" the redshirt. In 2024 and 2025, postseason games did not count against the four-game limit. These changes to redshirt rules gave players during this time several extra games to accumulate statistics.
- A more recent change likely to significantly affect future career leaderboards was introduced in 2026 with full implementation starting with the 2027 freshman class. Going forward, redshirting will be prohibited, but players will have five years of full athletic eligibility, provided that they are no older than 19 when they first enroll in a postsecondary institution. Players who had remaining eligibility under previous rules at the end of the 2025 season will benefit from the new rule.

These lists are updated through the end of the 2025 season.

== Passing ==
=== Passing yards ===
Career
Rk	Player	Yards	Years
1	Jeremiah Briscoe	11,488	2015 2016 2017
2	Brian Bell	8,655	2010 2011 2012
3	Eric Schmid	7,401	2018 2019 2020 2021
4	Rhett Bomar	5,564	2007 2008
5	Jared Johnson	5,352	2013 2014 2015
6	Arthur Louis	4,902	1977 1978 1979 1980
7	Dustin Long	4,588	2004
8	Reggie Lewis	4,269	1984 1985 1986 1987
9	Keegan Shoemaker	3,933	2021 2022 2023
10	Ty Brock	3,885	2018 2019

Single season
Rk	Player	Yards	Year
1	Jeremiah Briscoe	5,003	2017
2	Jeremiah Briscoe	4,602	2016
3	Dustin Long	4,588	2004
4	Josh McCown	3,481	2001
5	Rhett Bomar	3,355	2008
6	Jared Johnson	3,054	2014
7	Eric Schmid	2,818	2021
8	Eric Schmid	2,808	2020
9	Brian Bell	2,715	2012
10	Keegan Shoemaker	2,507	2023

Single game
Rk	Player	Yards	Year	Opponent
1	Dustin Long	577	2004	McNeese State
2	Eric Schmid	531	2019	Incarnate Word
3	Jeremiah Briscoe	509	2017	Northwestern State
4	Rhett Bomar	506	2008	Southeastern Louisiana
5	Jeremiah Briscoe	505	2017	South Dakota
6	Jeremiah Briscoe	504	2016	McNeese State
7	Chris Chaloupka	497	1999	Stephen F. Austin
8	Blake Joseph	482	2009	North Dakota State
9	Dustin Long	478	2004	Eastern Washington
10	Jeremiah Briscoe	464	2017	Houston Baptist

=== Passing touchdowns ===
Career
Rk	Player	TDs	Years
1	Jeremiah Briscoe	116	2015 2016 2017
2	Brian Bell	84	2010 2011 2012
3	Eric Schmid	62	2018 2019 2020 2021
4	Dustin Long	39	2004
	Jared Johnson	39	2013 2014 2015
6	Rhett Bomar	37	2007 2008
7	Arthur Louis	34	1977 1978 1979 1980
8	Don Gottlob	33	1950 1951 1952
9	Josh McCown	32	2001
10	Reggie Lewis	30	1984 1985 1986 1987

Single season
Rk	Player	TDs	Year
1	Jeremiah Briscoe	57	2016
2	Jeremiah Briscoe	45	2017
3	Dustin Long	39	2004
4	Josh McCown	32	2001
	Brian Bell	32	2013
6	Eric Schmid	29	2021
7	Rhett Bomar	27	2008
8	Brian Bell	25	2012
9	Chris Chaloupka	21	1999
	Jared Johnson	21	2014

Single game
Rk	Player	TDs	Year	Opponent
1	Jeremiah Briscoe	7	2016	Stephen F. Austin
	Jeremiah Briscoe	7	2016	Central Arkansas
3	Jeremiah Briscoe	6	2016	Abilene Christian
	Jeremiah Briscoe	6	2016	McNeese State
	Eric Schmid	6	2020	Nicholls State

== Rushing ==
=== Rushing yards ===
Career
Rk	Player	Yards	Years
1	Timothy Flanders	5,664	2010 2011 2012 2013
2	Corey Avery	3,348	2015 2016 2017
3	Charles Harris	2,688	1991 1992 1993 1994
4	McNeil Moore	2,578	1951 1952 1953
5	Keshawn Hill	2,546	2011 2012 2013 2014
6	Tony January	2,376	1978 1979 1980 1981 1982
7	Curtis Thomas	2,285	1988 1989 1990 1991
8	Richard Sincere	2,274	2010 2011 2012 2013
9	James Oliphant	2,263	1973 1974 1975 1976
10	Joe Rauls	2,255	1998 1999 2000 2001

Single season
Rk	Player	Yards	Year
1	Timothy Flanders	1,644	2011
2	Timothy Flanders	1,642	2012
3	Corey Avery	1,483	2015
4	Timothy Flanders	1,430	2013
5	D.D. Terry	1,327	2006
6	Ramon Jefferson	1,155	2021
7	Keshawn Hill	1,150	2014
8	Charles Harris	1,142	1993
9	Fred Reese	1,115	1970
10	Corey Avery	1,110	2017

Single game
Rk	Player	Yards	Year	Opponent
1	Timothy Flanders	287	2011	Montana
2	McNeil Moore	286	1951	Lamar
3	Timothy Flanders	280	2013	Eastern Washington
4	D.D. Terry	278	2006	Southeastern Louisiana
5	D.D. Terry	253	2006	McNeese State
6	Fred Reese	245	1970	McMurry
7	Keshawn Hill	244	2014	Central Arkansas
8	Benny Boles	233	1955	Texas Lutheran
9	Timothy Flanders	231	2012	Eastern Washington
10	Curtis Thomas	218	1990	Stephen F. Austin

=== Rushing touchdowns ===
Career
Rk	Player	TDs	Years
1	Timothy Flanders	66	2010 2011 2012 2013
2	Corey Avery	39	2015 2016 2017
3	Luther Turner	35	1985 1986 1987
4	Keshawn Hill	34	2011 2012 2013
5	McNeil Moore	30	1951 1952 1953
6	Charles Harris	26	1991 1992 1993 1994
7	Brian Bell	23	2010 2011 2012 2013
8	Richard Sincere	21	2010 2011 2012 2013
9	Curtis Thomas	20	1988 1989 1990 1991
	Chris Poullard	20	2006 2007 2008 2009
	Ramon Jefferson	20	2020 2021

Single season
Rk	Player	TDs	Year
1	Timothy Flanders	22	2011
2	Luther Turner	20	1987
3	Keshawn Hill	18	2014
4	Timothy Flanders	17	2012
5	Luther Turner	15	1985
	D.D. Terry	15	2006
	Corey Avery	15	2015
8	Timothy Flanders	14	2013
	Corey Avery	14	2017
	Donovan Williams	14	2019

Single game
Rk	Player	TDs	Year	Opponent
1	Timothy Flanders	5	2011	New Mexico
2	Charles Harris	4	1992	North Texas
	James Aston	4	2008	Nicholls State
	Timothy Flanders	4	2012	Lamar
	Keshawn Hill	4	2014	Stephen F. Austin
	Donavan Williams	4	2015	Texas Tech
	Corey Avery	4	2016	Incarnate Word
	Eric Schmid	4	2020	Lamar

== Receiving ==
=== Receptions ===
Career
Rk	Player	Rec	Years
1	Yedidiah Louis	294	2014 2015 2016 2017
2	Nathan Stewart	227	2016 2017 2018 2019
3	Davion Davis	226	2015 2016 2017 2018
4	Matt Dominguez	211	1997 1998 1999 2000
5	Noah Smith	210	2019 2020 2021 2022 2023 2024
6	Jonathon Cooper	185	1998 1999 2000 2001
7	Ife Adeyi	164	2019 2020 2021 2022 2023 2024
8	Clay Lowry	148	1976 1977 1978 1979
9	Kevin Pesak	147	1994 1995 1996 1997
10	Jarrod Fuller	146	2003 2004

Single season
Rk	Player	Rec	Year
1	Jarrod Fuller	99	2004
2	Jonathon Cooper	92	2001
3	Noah Smith	79	2023
4	Davion Davis	78	2017
5	Yedidiah Louis	76	2016
	Yedidiah Louis	76	2017
7	Jason Mathenia	74	2004
8	Nathan Stewart	72	2017
9	Yedidiah Louis	71	2014
10	Yedidiah Louis	71	2015

Single game
Rk	Player	Rec	Year	Opponent
1	Jason Mathenia	13	2004	Eastern Washington
	Torrance Williams	13	2013	Central Arkansas
	Davion Davis	13	2017	Stephen F. Austin
	Davion Davis	13	2018	Lamar
	Chandler Harvin	13	2019	Houston Baptist
	Noah Smith	13	2023	Liberty
7	Davion Davis	12	2015	Texas Tech
	Nathan Stewart	12	2016	McNeese
9	Matt Dominguez	11	2000	Stephen F. Austin
	Jonathon Cooper	11	2001	Northern Illinois
	Yedidiah Louis	11	2016	Central Arkansas
	Yedidiah Louis	11	2017	Abilene Christian
	Simeon Evans	11	2023	Middle Tennessee

=== Receiving yards ===
Career
Rk	Player	Yards	Years
1	Nathan Stewart	4,494	2016 2017 2018 2019
2	Yedidiah Louis	3,942	2014 2015 2016 2017
3	Matt Dominguez	3,273	1997 1998 1999 2000
4	Davion Davis	3,181	2015 2016 2017 2018
5	Clay Lowry	2,833	1976 1977 1978 1979
6	Jonathon Cooper	2,617	1998 1999 2000 2001
7	Ife Adeyi	2,312	2019 2020 2021 2022 2023 2024
8	Jason Mathenia	2,106	2002 2003 2004
9	Jarrod Fuller	2,011	2003 2004
10	Noah Smith	1,961	2019 2020 2021 2022 2023 2024

Single season
Rk	Player	Yards	Year
1	Nathan Stewart	1,648	2017
2	Jonathon Cooper	1,477	2001
3	Jarrod Fuller	1,383	2004
4	Jason Mathenia	1,357	2004
5	Davion Davis	1,206	2017
6	Clay Lowry	1,203	1978
7	Matt Dominguez	1,155	1999
8	Yedidiah Louis	1,152	2016
9	Jason Madkins	1,073	2009
10	Nathan Stewart	1,063	2018

Single game
Rk	Player	Yards	Year	Opponent
1	Nathan Stewart	268	2016	McNeese State
2	Nathan Stewart	247	2017	Northwestern State
3	Jonathon Cooper	242	2001	Western Illinois
4	Jason Madkins	239	2009	North Dakota State
5	Catron Houston	235	2008	Southeastern Louisiana
6	Jason Mathenia	226	2004	Eastern Washington
7	Matt Dominguez	224	2000	Stephen F. Austin
8	Clay Lowry	211	1978	East Texas State
9	Jonathon Cooper	205	2001	Northern Illinois

=== Receiving touchdowns ===
Career
Rk	Player	TDs	Years
1	Davion Davis	40	2015 2016 2017 2018
2	Nathan Stewart	37	2016 2017 2018 2019
3	Yedidiah Louis	29	2014 2015 2016 2017
4	Matt Dominguez	27	1997 1998 1999 2000
5	Jonathon Cooper	24	1998 1999 2000 2001
6	Clay Lowry	21	1976 1977 1978 1979
7	Ife Adeyi	19	2019 2020 2021 2022 2023 2024
8	Torrance Williams	17	2010 2011 2012 2013
9	LaDarius Brown	16	2014 2015
	Noah Smith	16	2019 2020 2021 2022 2023 2024

Single season
Rk	Player	TDs	Year
1	Jonathon Cooper	18	2001
2	Davion Davis	17	2017
3	Yedidiah Louis	14	2016
	Nathan Stewart	14	2017
5	Matt Dominguez	13	1999
	Jason Mathenia	13	2004
7	Clay Lowry	12	1978
	Torrance Williams	12	2013
	Nathan Stewart	12	2016
10	Davion Davis	10	2016
	Davion Davis	10	2018
	Ife Adeyi	10	2021

Single game
Rk	Player	TDs	Year	Opponent
1	Matt Dominguez	4	1999	Nicholls State
	Yedidiah Louis	4	2016	Central Arkansas
	Davion Davis	4	2017	Northwestern State
	Davion Davis	4	2018	Northwestern State

== Total offense ==
Total offense is the sum of passing and rushing statistics. It does not include receiving or returns.

=== Total offense yards ===
Career
Rk	Player	Yards	Years
1	Jeremiah Briscoe	11,393	2015 2016 2017
2	Brian Bell	10,184	2010 2011 2012 2013
3	Eric Schmid	8,305	2018 2019 2020 2021
4	Jared Johnson	6,953	2013 2014 2015
5	Rhett Bomar	6,160	2007 2008
6	Reggie Lewis	5,150	1984 1985 1986 1987
7	Arthur Louis	4,933	1977 1978 1979 1980
8	Dustin Long	4,576	2004
9	Keegan Shoemaker	4,478	2021 2022 2023
10	Don Gottlob	4,200	1950 1951 1952

Single season
Rk	Player	Yards	Year
1	Jeremiah Briscoe	5,041	2017
2	Dustin Long	4,576	2004
3	Jeremiah Briscoe	4,549	2016
4	Jared Johnson	4,053	2014
5	Josh McCown	3,832	2001
6	Rhett Bomar	3,542	2008
7	Eric Schmid	3,244	2020
8	Eric Schmid	3,161	2021
9	Brian Bell	3,104	2013
10	Brian Bell	3,095	2012

Single game
Rk	Player	Yards	Year	Opponent
1	Dustin Long	598	2004	McNeese State
2	Eric Schmid	536	2019	Incarnate Word
3	#N/A	534	2009	North Dakota State
4	Eric Schmid	516	2020	Southeastern Louisiana
5	Rhett Bomar	509	2008	Southeastern Louisiana
6	Jeremiah Briscoe	503	2017	Northwestern State
7	Jeremiah Briscoe	492	2017	South Dakota
8	Chris Chaloupka	490	1999	Stephen F. Austin
9	Jeremiah Briscoe	486	2016	McNeese
10	Dustin Long	482	2004	Eastern Washington

== Defense ==
=== Interceptions ===
Career
Rk	Player	Ints	Years
1	Dax Swanson	14	2009 2010 2011 2012
2	Ronnie Choate	13	1956 1957 1958 1959
	Zyon McCollum	13	2017 2018 2019 2020 2021
4	Garry Kimble	12	1981 1982 1983 1984
	Mark Hughes	12	2001 2002 2003 2004
6	Bobby Coleman	11	1979 1980 1981
7	Charles Boyce	10	1988 1989 1990 1991
	Jaylen Thomas	10	2017 2018 2019 2020 2021
9	Charles Stanley	9	1976 1977

Single season
Rk	Player	Ints	Year
1	Dax Swanson	8	2011
2	Allen Boren	7	1954
	Billy Anderson	7	1987
4	McNeil Moore	6	1953
	Bobby Coleman	6	1981

Single game
Rk	Player	Ints	Year	Opponent
1	Charles Stanley	3	1977	Howard Payne
	Mark Hughes	3	2004	McNeese State

=== Tackles ===
Career
Rk	Player	Tackles	Years
1	Stan Blinka	538	1975 1976 1977 1978
2	Trevor Williams	395	2018 2019 2020 2021 2022 2023
3	Lish Adams	383	1986 1987 1988
4	Pete Garner	353	1981 1982 1983 1984
5	Keith Davis	339	1998 1999 2000 2001
6	Darnell Taylor	338	2009 2010 2011 2012
7	Dedrick Manigo	330	1993 1994 1995 1996
8	Darryl Harrison	329	1989 1990 1991 1992
9	Adrian Contreras	299	2015 2016 2017 2018
10	P. J. Hall	284	2014 2015 2016 2017
	Hunter Brown	284	2016 2017 2018 2019

Single season
Rk	Player	Tackles	Year
1	Stan Blinka	211	1978
2	Pete Garner	143	1982
3	Lish Adams	139	1986
4	Stan Blinka	137	1977
5	Trevor Williams	135	2023
6	Darnell Taylor	128	2011
7	Lish Adams	127	1988

Single game
Rk	Player	Tackles	Year	Opponent
1	Stan Blinka	24	1978	Stephen F. Austin
	Ken Ingram	24	1982	Southwestern Oklahoma
3	Stan Blinka	23	1978	Southeastern Louisiana
4	Stan Blinka	22	1978	Angelo State
5	Dedrick Manigo	20	1996	Nicholls State
6	Lish Adams	19	1986	Nicholls State
7	Stan Blinka	18	1976	Southwest Texas
	Stan Blinka	18	1977	Southwest Oklahoma
	Dedrick Manigo	18	1995	Jacksonville State
	T.J. Dibble	18	2002	Western Illinois

=== Sacks ===
Career
Rk	Player	Sacks	Years
1	P. J. Hall	42.0	2014 2015 2016 2017
2	Andre Finley	36.0	1986 1987 1988 1989
3	Michael Bankston	19.0	1988 1989 1990 1991
4	Mouf Adebo	18.0	2013 2014 2015 2016
	Markel Perry	18.0	2017 2018 2019 2020 2021 2022 2023
6	Stan Blinka	17.0	1975 1976 1977 1978
	Lish Adams	17.0	1986 1987 1988
	Andrew Weaver	17.0	2011 2012 2013
9	Jahari Kay	16.0	2019 2020 2021

Single season
Rk	Player	Sacks	Year
1	Andre Finley	15.0	1988
2	Greenwood Horn	14.0	1992
3	Andre Finley	13.0	1987
	P. J. Hall	13.0	2016
	Chris Stewart	13.0	2017
6	P. J. Hall	12.0	2014
7	Michael Bankston	11.0	1991
	P. J. Hall	11.0	2015
9	Craig Carpenter	10.0	1997

Single game
Rk	Player	Sacks	Year	Opponent
1	Michael Bankston	4.0	1991	Angelo State
	Will Henry	4.0	2010	Nicholls State
	P. J. Hall	4.0	2016	McNeese State

== Kicking ==
=== Field goals made ===
Career
Rk	Player	FGs	Years
1	Miguel Antonio	51	2009 2010 2011 2012
2	Billy Hayes	47	1985 1986 1987 1988
3	Tre Honshtein	46	2015 2016 2017 2018
4	Marcus Hajdik	39	1992 1993 1994 1995 1996
5	Mark Klein	38	1989 1990 1991
6	Luc Swimberghe	35	2013 2014 2015 2016
	Seth Morgan	35	2020 2021 2022
8	Joey Price	29	2000 2001 2002 2003
	Taylor Wilkins	29	2006 2007 2008 2009
10	Phil Harmening	25	1978 1979 1980 1981
	Lance Garner	25	2002 2003 2004

Single season
Rk	Player	FGs	Year
1	Tre Honshtein	22	2017
2	Miguel Antonio	20	2012
3	Luc Swimberghe	18	2014
4	Mark Klein	17	1990
5	Billy Hayes	16	1986
	Lance Garner	16	2004
7	Seth Morgan	15	2022
8	Mark Klein	14	1991
	Taylor Wilkins	14	2007
	Miguel Antonio	14	2010
	Tre Honshtein	14	2018
	Christian Pavon	14	2024

Single game
Rk	Player	FGs	Year	Opponent
1	Phil Harmening	5	1981	Howard Payne
	Mark Klein	5	1991	Texas Southern
3	Jeff Jones	4	1982	Southwestern Oklahoma
	Jeff Jones	4	1984	Bishop
	Seth Morgan	4	2022	Eastern Kentucky
	Seth Morgan	4	2022	Tarleton
	Christian Pavon	4	2025	Delaware
