= List of Sam Houston Bearkats in the NFL draft =

This is a list of Sam Houston Bearkats football players in the NFL draft.

== Key ==
B	Back	K	Kicker	NT	Nose tackle
C	Center	LB	Linebacker	FB	Fullback
DB	Defensive back	P	Punter	HB	Halfback
DE	Defensive end	QB	Quarterback	WR	Wide receiver
DT	Defensive tackle	RB	Running back	G	Guard
E	End	T	Offensive tackle	TE	Tight end

== Selections ==
Year	Round	Pick	Overall	Player	Team	Position
1942	11	2	92	Ben Hightower	Cleveland Rams	E
1942	15	1	131	Hubbard Law	Pittsburgh Steelers	B
1950	11	7	138	Charley Williams	Pittsburgh Steelers	E
1954	17	5	198	Lou Woodard	Chicago Bears	C
1954	18	5	210	McNeil Moore	Chicago Bears	B
1955	17	10	203	Mel Harrison	Chicago Bears	C
1955	27	12	325	Bobby Baldwin	Cleveland Browns	B
1956	25	9	298	Jerry Hentschel	Chicago Bears	T
1958	23	4	269	Ken Daw	Chicago Bears	B
1958	29	2	339	Bob Haynes	Green Bay Packers	T
1958	29	10	347	Herman Hodges	San Francisco 49ers	B
1969	9	2	210	George Wright	Baltimore Colts	DT
1971	17	26	442	Charles Hill	Oakland Raiders	WR
1973	12	8	294	Ron Carroll	Buffalo Bills	DT
1978s	10	0	0	Johnnie Dirden	Houston Oilers	WR
1979	5	15	125	Stan Blinka	New York Jets	LB
1983	12	23	330	Roger Wiley	Pittsburgh Steelers	RB
1985	11	24	304	Garry Kimble	Washington Redskins	DB
1988	5	18	127	Carl Mims	Washington Redskins	DB
1989	7	10	177	Rickey Royal	Phoenix Cardinals	DB
1992	4	16	100	Michael Bankston	Phoenix Cardinals	DT
1995	6	18	189	John Solomon	Minnesota Vikings	LB
1996	7	15	224	Darius Smith	Oakland Raiders	C
2002	3	16	81	Josh McCown	Arizona Cardinals	QB
2002	6	2	174	Keith Heinrich	Carolina Panthers	TE
2009	5	15	151	Rhett Bomar	New York Giants	QB
2016	7	14	235	Lac Edwards	New York Jets	P
2018	2	25	57	P. J. Hall	Oakland Raiders	DT
2022	5	14	157	Zyon McCollum	Tampa Bay Buccaneers	CB
