= Dustin Long =

Dustin Long may refer to:

- Dustin Long (American football) (born 1981), American footballer
- Dustin Long (writer), American novelist
