= P. J. Hall (disambiguation) =

PJ or P. J. Hall may refer to:

- P. J. Hall (American football) (born 1995), American NFL and UFL player
- PJ Hall (basketball) (born 2002), American college basketball player
