= Sam Houston Bearkats football =

Intercollegiate American football team

| 2026 Sam Houston Bearkats football team |
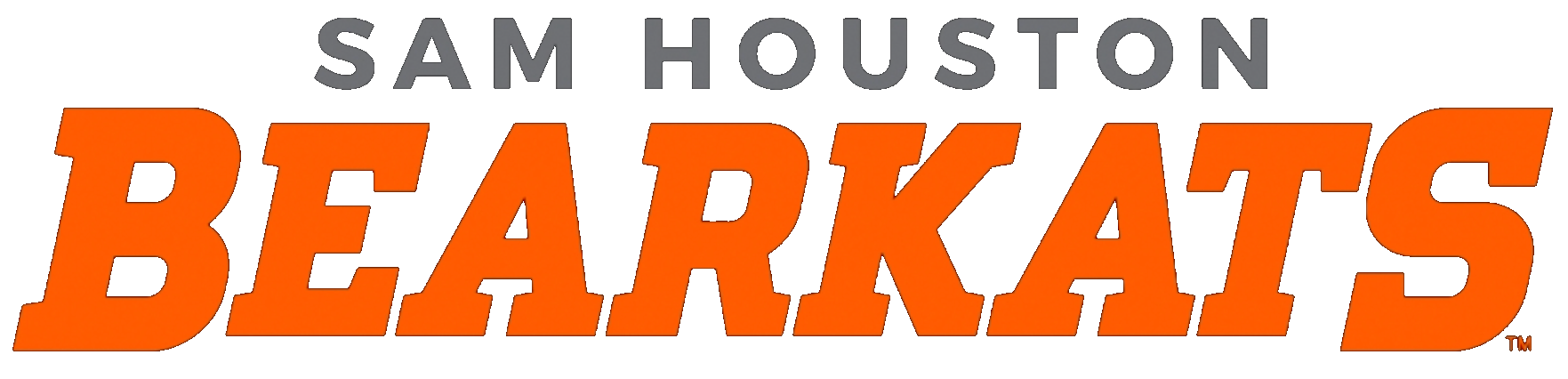
- First season: 1912; 114 years ago
- Athletic director: Bobby Williams
- General manager: Vacant
- Head coach: Freddie Aughtry-Lindsay (interim) & Eric Raisbeck (interim)
- Location: Huntsville, Texas
- Stadium: Bowers Stadium (capacity: 14,000)
- NCAA division: Division I FBS
- Conference: Conference USA
- Colors: Orange and white
- All-time record: 583–502–34 (.536)
- Bowl record: 3–1–1 (.700)

NCAA Division I FCS championships
- 2020

NAIA national championships
- 1964

Conference championships
- TIAA: 1930 LSC: 1955, 1956, 1961, 1964 GSC: 1985, 1986 Southland: 2001, 2004, 2011, 2012, 2014, 2016, 2020 WAC: 2021
- Rivalries: Texas State (rivalry); Stephen F. Austin (rivalry)
- Fight song: Bearkat Fight Song
- Mascot: Sammy Bearkat
- Marching band: Bearkat Marching Band
- Outfitter: Under Armour
- Website: GoBearkats.com

The Sam Houston Bearkats football program is the intercollegiate American football team for Sam Houston State University located in the U.S. state of Texas. The team competes in the NCAA Division I Football Bowl Subdivision (FBS) as a member of the Conference USA. Sam Houston's first football team was fielded in 1912. The team plays its home games at the 14,000-seat Bowers Stadium in Huntsville, Texas.

In July 2021, the Bearkats left the Southland Conference to join the Western Athletic Conference, which relaunched its football league at the FCS level at that time. Just a few months later, on November 5, 2021, the school accepted an invitation to join Conference USA at the NCAA Division I Football Bowl Subdivision (FBS) level beginning in the 2023–24 season.

== History ==
Sam Houston has fielded a football team since 1912 and have played continuously since 1946 following World War II. The only times the Bearkats did not field a football team were in 1918 for World War I, from 1943 to 1945 for World War II, and 2020 due to the COVID-19 pandemic (although they did get a make-up season in the spring of 2021). The Bearkats competed independently from 1912 through 1923, in the Texas Intercollegiate Athletic Association (TIAA) from 1924 to 1931, in the Lone Star Conference from 1932 to 1984, in the Gulf Star Conference from 1982 to 1985 and in the Southland Conference from 1986 to 2021. In July 2021, The Bearkats left the Southland Conference to join the Western Athletic Conference, which relaunched its football league at the FCS level at that time. Just a few months later, on November 5, 2021, the school accepted an invitation to join FBS Conference USA beginning in the 2023–24 season.

The Bearkats won their first FCS National Championship in the 2020–21 college football season, beating South Dakota State 23–21.

The Bearkats have won 15 conference championships, and have seen postseason NCAA playoff action in 13 seasons, with back-to-back NCAA Division I Championship game appearances in 2011–2012. Sam Houston State also has 3 bowl victories in four games, and one claimed National Championship from NAIA in the 1964 season.

== Head coaches ==
Ron Randleman is Sam Houston's and the Southland Conference's all-time winningest coach with 131 wins over a span of 23 years. Randleman also won conference Coach of the Year honors on four occasions, in the Gulf Star Conference in 1985 and 1986, and in the Southland Conference in 1991, and 2001.

Paul Pierce coached the Bearkats to its only National Championship as a member of NAIA, and also won the 1965 Knute Rockne Little All-American Coach of the Year award.

Willie Fritz coached Sam Houston to back-to-back conference championships and back-to-back national title game appearances in only three years, while being awarded the 2011 AFCA National Coach of the Year award and the 2012 Liberty Mutual Coach of the Year award. He was also named the 2012 AFCA Regional Coach of the Year.

On January 23, 2014, former Delaware head coach K. C. Keeler was named the 15th head coach in Sam Houston program history. Under Keeler, Sam Houston consistently made deep runs in the FCS playoffs, making appearances every year from 2014-2017 and claimed the ultimate prize winning the FCS National Championship in 2020 (played in Spring 2021).

Keeler finished with a record of 97-39, winning four conference titles in his 11 seasons as head coach. The winner of the 2016 Eddie Robinson Award, as a Bearkat, Keeler became both the all-time FCS playoffs wins leader and the only coach to win an FCS title with two different schools. After the 2024 season Keeler left to accept the head coaching job at Temple leaving Brad Cornelsen as interim head coach for the Bearkats' first Bowl Game.

In 2025, former Wisconsin offensive coordinator, Phil Longo was named the 17th head coach of the program.

| Name | From | To | Season(s) | Record | | | Postseason |
| Name | From | To | Season(s) | W | L | T | Postseason |
|---|---|---|---|---|---|---|---|
| S. R. Warner | 1912 | 1913 | 2 | 5 | 3 | 1 | |
| Gene Berry | 1914 | 1919 | 6 | 14 | 15 | 1 | |
| Mutt Gee | 1920 | 1922 | 3 | 6 | 7 | 4 | |
| J. W. Jones | 1923 | 1935 | 13 | 54 | 52 | 10 | 1930 Texas Intercollegiate Athletic Association champions |
| Henry O. Crawford | 1936 | 1937 | 2 | 7 | 12 | 0 | |
| Puny Wilson | 1937 | 1951 | 15 | 50 | 49 | 6 | |
| Paul Pierce | 1952 | 1967 | 16 | 94 | 52 | 7 | 1955 Lone Star Conference co-champions, 1956 LSC champions, 1964 LSC, NAIA National co-champions, 3 bowl wins in 4 appearances |
| Tom Page | 1968 | 1971 | 4 | 20 | 19 | 3 | |
| Allen Boren | 1972 | 1973 | 2 | 7 | 14 | 0 | |
| Billy Tidwell | 1974 | 1977 | 4 | 11 | 30 | 1 | |
| Melvin Brown | 1978 | 1981 | 4 | 12 | 29 | 0 | |
| Ron Randleman | 1982 | 2004 | 23 | 131 | 125 | 3 | 1985 Gulf Star Conference co-champions, 1986 GSC champions, 2001 Southland Conference co-champions, 2004 SLC co-champions |
| Todd Whitten | 2005 | 2009 | 5 | 25 | 28 | 0 | |
| Willie Fritz | 2010 | 2014 | 5 | 40 | 15 | 0 | 2011 SLC champions, 2011 NCAA Division I Finalist, 2012 SLC co-champions 2012 NCAA Division I Finalist |
| K. C. Keeler | 2014 | 2024 | 11 | 97 | 39 | 0 | 2014 SLC co-champions, 2014 NCAA Division I Semifinalist, 2015 NCAA Division I Semifinalist, 2016 SLC champions, 2016 NCAA Division I Quarterfinalist, 2017 NCAA Division I Semifinalist, 2020 SLC champions, 2020 NCAA Division I National Champions, 2021 WAC champions, 2021 NCAA Division I Quarterfinalist |
| Brad Cornelsen† | 2024 | – | – | 1 | 0 | 0 | 2024 New Orleans Bowl Champions |
| Phil Longo | 2025 | present | 1 | 2 | 10 | 0 | |
| Composite record | 1912 | present | 115 | 575 | 499 | 36 | |

^{†} Interim head coach

== Championships ==
=== National championships ===
Sam Houston has two national championships, with one during their tenure in the National Association of Intercollegiate Athletics and the other coming in FCS. In their NAIA championship game, they played Concordia Cobbers for the championship, with the game resulting in a tie, becoming co-champions with Moorhead. In their third FCS championship game, they defeated South Dakota State to win their first FCS national championship.

| Season | Coach | Selector | Record | Result | Opponent |
|---|---|---|---|---|---|
| 1964 | Paul Pierce | National Association of Intercollegiate Athletics | 9–1–1 | T 7–7 | Concordia College |
| 2020 | K. C. Keeler | NCAA Division I Football Championship Subdivision | 10–0 | W 23–21 | South Dakota State |

=== Conference championships ===
Sam Houston has won 15 conference titles, seven shared and eight outright.

| Year | Conference | Coach | Overall Record | Conference record |
|---|---|---|---|---|
| 1930 | Texas Intercollegiate Athletic Association | J. W. Jones | 9–1 | 5–0 |
| 1955† | Lone Star Conference | Paul Pierce | 6–1–2 | 5–1–1 |
| 1956 | Lone Star Conference | Paul Pierce | 10–0 | 7–0 |
| 1961 | Lone Star Conference | Paul Pierce | 8–1 | 7–0 |
| 1964†* | Lone Star Conference | Paul Pierce | 9–1–1 | 5–1 |
| 1985† | Gulf Star Conference | Ron Randleman | 8–3 | 4–1 |
| 1986 | Gulf Star Conference | Ron Randleman | 9–3 | 4–1 |
| 2001† | Southland Conference | Ron Randleman | 10–3 | 5–1 |
| 2004† | Southland Conference | Ron Randleman | 8–3 | 4–1 |
| 2011 | Southland Conference | Willie Fritz | 14–1 | 7–0 |
| 2012† | Southland Conference | Willie Fritz | 11–4 | 6–1 |
| 2014† | Southland Conference | K. C. Keeler | 11–5 | 7–1 |
| 2016 | Southland Conference | K. C. Keeler | 12–1 | 9–0 |
| 2020 | Southland Conference | K. C. Keeler | 10–0 | 6–0 |
| 2021 | Western Athletic Conference | K. C. Keeler | 11–1 | 5–0 |

† Denotes shared title.

Conference affiliations

- 1912–1923: Independent
- 1924–1930: Texas Intercollegiate Athletic Association
- 1931–1981: Lone Star Conference (NAIA)
- 1982–1983: Lone Star Conference (NCAA Division II)
- 1984–1986: Gulf Star Conference (Division I FCS)
- 1987–2020: Southland Conference (Division I FCS)
- 2021–2022: Western Athletic Conference (Division I FCS)
- 2023–present: Conference USA (Division I FBS)

=== Bowl game appearances ===
Sam Houston appeared in five bowl games during their time in the NAIA, going 3–0–1 in these bowl games, with the final one notably being for the NAIA championship. Since joining Division I FBS, the Bearkats have been invited to one bowl game.

| Season | Bowl | Opponent | Result |
|---|---|---|---|
| 1952 | Shrimp Bowl† | Northeastern State (OK) | W 41–20 |
| 1953 | Refrigerator Bowl† | College of Idaho | W 14–12 |
| 1956 | Refrigerator Bowl† | Middle Tennessee State | W 27–13 |
| 1958 | Christmas Festival Bowl† | Northwestern State | L 11–18 |
| 1964 | Championship Bowl† | Concordia College | T 7–7 |
| 2024 | New Orleans Bowl | Georgia Southern | W 31–26 |

† non-Division I bowl game

== Playoff appearances ==
=== NCAA Division I-AA/FCS ===
The Bearkats have appeared in the I-AA/FCS playoffs 13 times, with an overall record of 24–12. They were NCAA Division I National Champions in 2020.

| Year | Round | Opponent | Result |
|---|---|---|---|
| 1986 | First Round | Arkansas State | L 7–48 |
| 1991 | First Round | Middle Tennessee State | L 19–20 ^{OT} |
| 2001 | First Round; Quarterfinals | Northern Arizona; Montana | W 34–31; L 24–49 |
| 2004 | First Round; Quarterfinals; Semifinals | Western Kentucky; Eastern Washington; Montana | W 54–21; W 35–34; L 13–34 |
| 2011 | Second Round; Quarterfinals; Semifinals; National Championship Game | Stony Brook; Montana State; Montana; North Dakota State | W 34–27; W 49–13; W 31–28; L 6–17 |
| 2012 | Second Round; Quarterfinals; Semifinals; National Championship Game | Cal Poly; Montana State; Eastern Washington; North Dakota State | W 18–16; W 34–16; W 45–42; L 13–39 |
| 2013 | First Round; Second Round | Southern Utah; Southeastern Louisiana | W 51–20; L 29–30 |
| 2014 | First Round; Second Round; Quarterfinals; Semifinals | Southeastern Louisiana; Jacksonville State; Villanova; North Dakota State | W 21–17; W 37–26; W 34–31; L 3–35 |
| 2015 | First Round; Second Round; Quarterfinals; Semifinals | Southern Utah; McNeese State; Colgate; Jacksonville State | W 42–39; W 34–29; W 48–21; L 10–62 |
| 2016 | Second Round; Quarterfinals | Chattanooga; James Madison | W 41–36; L 7–65 |
| 2017 | Second Round; Quarterfinals; Semifinals | South Dakota; Kennesaw State; North Dakota State | W 54–42; W 34–27; L 13–55 |
| 2020 | First Round; Quarterfinals; Semifinals; National Championship Game | Monmouth; North Dakota State; James Madison; South Dakota State | W 21–15; W 24–20; W 38–35; W 23–21 |
| 2021 | Second Round; Quarterfinals | Incarnate Word; Montana State | W 49–42; L 19–42 |

=== NAIA ===
The Bearkats appeared in the NAIA playoffs one time, with a combined record of 1–0–1.

| Year | Round | Opponent | Result |
|---|---|---|---|
| 1964 | Semifinals; National Championship | Findlay; Concordia–Moorhead | W, 32–12; T, 7–7 |

== Home stadiums ==
=== Pritchett Field (1912–1985) ===
The Bearkats' home for football was on Pritchett Field for 73 years (1912–1985) beginning with their first football game against Rice University in 1912. The field was named after Joseph Pritchett, brother of the university's fourth president Henry Carr Pritchett, and former owner of the land the field rests on.

The final football game played on Pritchett Field was a victory for the Bearkats with a score of 51–7, defeating Washburn University. Sam Houston Football began playing games at Bowers Stadium following the 1985 season. The complex is currently home to Sam Houston Women's Soccer and Club Lacrosse.

On April 18, 2013, football was played on Pritchett Field for the first time since 1985 for the annual Orange-White spring game. The event also included the presentation of the Liberty Mutual Coach of the Year Award to head coach Willie Fritz.

=== Bowers Stadium (1986–present) ===
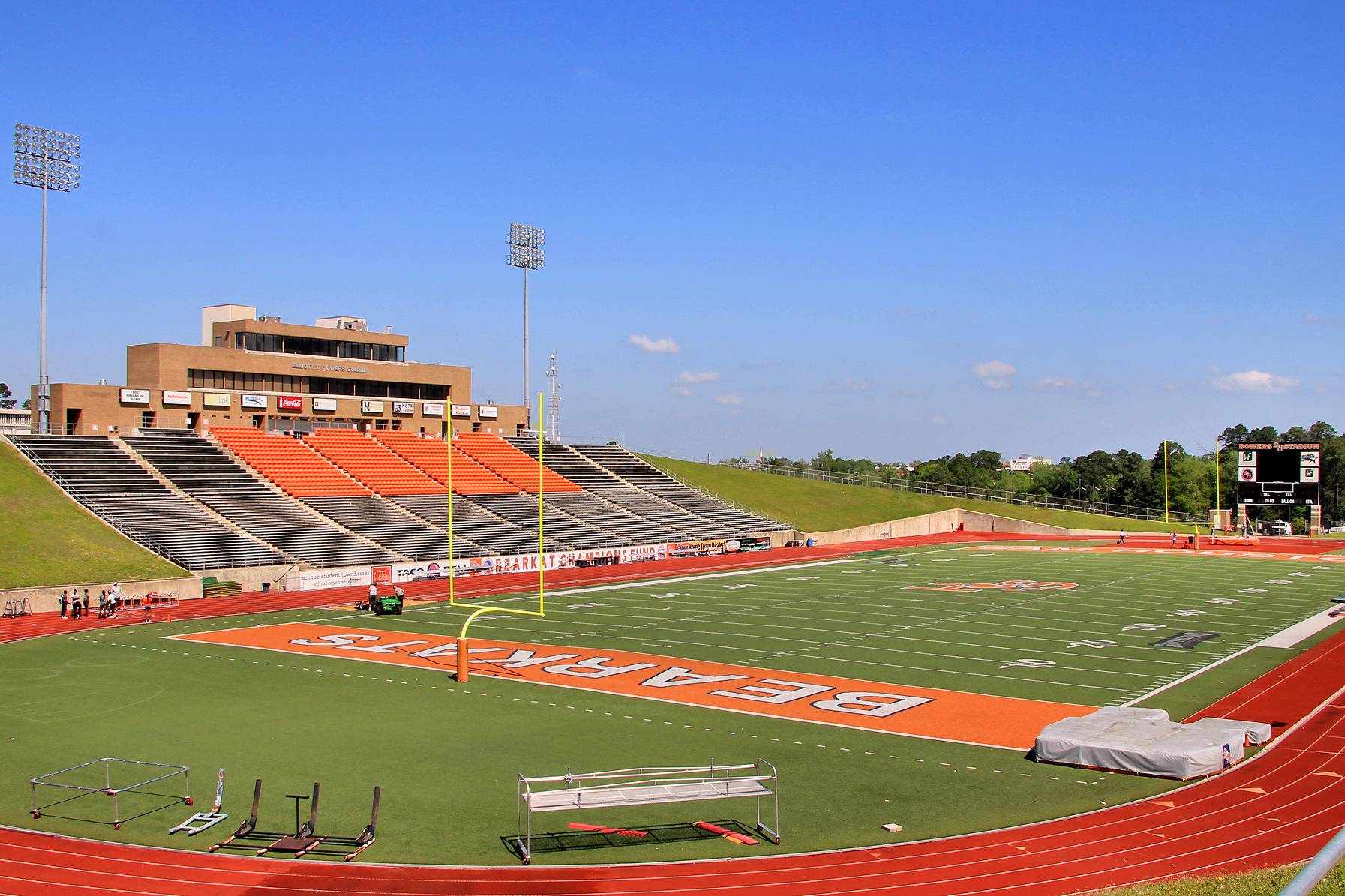
Bowers Stadium in Huntsville, home of the Sam Houston Bearkats football team

Bowers Stadium, formerly Bearkat Stadium (1986–1989), is currently home to both Sam Houston football and track and field programs, beginning with the 1986 season. Bowers Stadium has a capacity of 14,000. However, 16,148 fans packed Bowers Stadium in 1994 to watch Alcorn State led by NFL bound quarterback Steve McNair in a 48–23 SAM HOUSTON victory on regional ABC-TV.

=== Shell Energy Stadium (2025) ===
Due to renovations at Bowers Stadium, specifically the construction of a new press box, the Bearkats are playing their 2025 home games at Shell Energy Stadium in Houston, home of Major League Soccer's Houston Dynamo FC and the National Women's Soccer League's Houston Dash. Going into the 2025 season, the Bearkats had played 47 games in Houston, although only one had been at the venue now known as Shell Energy Stadium. According to the Sam Houston athletic administration, the temporary move "allows Sam Houston Athletics to offer expanded fan amenities and a full gameday experience which would not be possible in a reduced-capacity Bowers Stadium during the renovation process."

== Rivalries ==
=== Stephen F. Austin ===
The Sam Houston/Stephen F. Austin rivalry game, also known as the Battle of the Piney Woods, is a yearly rivalry held at NRG Stadium in Houston. The two teams have met 91 times, with Sam Houston leading the series 60–34–2. The Battle of the Piney Woods is Texas' second longest FCS rivalry. The most recent meeting ending with the Bearkats defeating the Lumberjacks 21–20 and clinching their 10th win in a row. However, the rivalry is now in question as Sam Houston left the Western Athletic Conference for Conference USA in 2023.

=== Texas State ===
Sam Houston's second longest rivalry (dating back to 1915) is Texas State University. The two teams held annual rivalry games in mainly football and basketball with Texas State boasting a 50–37–5 record in football (last game in 2011) and a 64–51 record in men's basketball (last game in 2012). The two universities are in the same university system (sharing many similarities) and competed in the same athletic conferences until Texas State left the Southland Conference for the Western Athletic Conference in 2012, eventually ending up in the Sun Belt Conference only a year later in 2013. The football rivalry has since been renewed beginning in the 2024 season.

== Notable former players ==
=== Bearkats in the National Football League ===
Sam Houston has had 30 alumni play in the National Football League, with 21 players selected in the Draft. During the 2018 NFL draft, the Oakland Raiders selected defensive lineman P. J. Hall in the second round. This represents the highest a Bearkat player has been drafted by an NFL team.

- Tucker Addington (2022–present), LS, Dallas Cowboys, New England Patriots, Jacksonville Jaguars, Washington Commanders, Miami Dolphins, Houston Texans, Pittsburgh Steelers
- Scorpio Babers (2008–2009), CB, Miami Dolphins, Green Bay Packers
- Michael Bankston (1992–2000), DL, Arizona Cardinals, Cincinnati Bengals
- Campbell Black (1932–1935), QB, Chicago Cardinals
- Stan Blinka (1979–1983), LB, New York Jets
- Rhett Bomar (2009–2012), QB, New York Giants, Minnesota Vikings, Oakland Raiders
- Davion Davis (2019–present), WR, Minnesota Vikings, Cleveland Browns, Houston Texans, Arizona Cardinals, Washington Commanders
- Keith Davis (2002–2008), DB, Dallas Cowboys
- Tim Denton (1998–2000), DB, Washington Redskins, San Diego Chargers
- Johnnie Dirden (1978–1981), WR, Houston Oilers, Kansas City Chiefs, Pittsburgh Steelers
- Trey Diller (2013), WR, Carolina Panthers
- Matt Dominguez (2001), TE, Denver Broncos
- Lac Edwards (2016–2021), P, New York Jets, Carolina Panthers
- Timothy Flanders (2014–2015), RB, New Orleans Saints, Cleveland Browns
- Timothy Flanders CFL (2015–2021), RB/WR, BC Lions, Winnipeg Blue Bombers, Calgary Stampeders, Ottawa RedBlacks
- P. J. Hall (2018–present), DT, Oakland Raiders
- Odie Harris (1988–1995), DB, Tampa Bay Buccaneers, Cleveland Browns, Arizona Cardinals, Houston Oilers
- Keith Heinrich (2002–2004, 2007), TE, Carolina Panthers, Cleveland Browns, Tampa Bay Buccaneers
- Jimmy Hill (1955–1966), DB, Chicago/St. Louis Cardinals, Detroit Lions, Kansas City Chiefs
- Ed Kallina (1928), OL, Chicago Bears
- Garry Kimble (1987), CB, Washington Redskins
- Tristin McCollum (2022–present), DB, Philadelphia Eagles, Las Vegas Raiders
- Zyon McCollum (2022–present), DB, Tampa Bay Buccaneers
- Josh McCown (2002–2020), QB, Arizona Cardinals, Detroit Lions, Oakland Raiders, Miami Dolphins, Carolina Panthers, San Francisco 49ers, Chicago Bears, Tampa Bay Buccaneers, Cleveland Browns, New York Jets, Philadelphia Eagles, Houston Texans
- Guido Merkens (1978–1987), DB QB P WR, Houston Oilers, New Orleans Saints, Philadelphia Eagles
- Mike Nelms (1980–1984), DB, Washington Redskins
- Ralph Ruthstrom (1945–1949), FB HB QB, Cleveland/LA Rams, Washington Redskins, Baltimore Colts
- Julian Spence (1956–1961), DB, Chicago Cardinals, San Francisco 49ers, Houston Oilers
- D. D. Terry (2007–2008), RB, Jacksonville Jaguars, Houston Texans
- George Wright (1970–1972), DT, Baltimore Colts, Cleveland Browns

== Individual awards ==
=== National awards ===
Sam Houston has had a total of 96 players selected into the College Football All-America Team, including 66 NCAA All-Americans and 30 NAIA All-Americans. A number of these players have also been considered for major national awards. In 2016, quarterback Jeremiah Briscoe became the first Bearkat to win the Payton Award. In 2017 he became the first Bearkat to win two Payton Awards and only the second FCS player to win multiple Payton Awards after former Appalachian State quarterback Armanti Edwards became the first in 2009.

Major honors

- Walter Payton Award finalists
  Most Outstanding FCS Offensive Player

Chris Chaloupka, QB, 1999 – 13th
Josh McCown, QB, 2001 – 7th
Dustin Long, QB, 2004 – 2nd
D. D. Terry, RB, 2006 – 16th
Timothy Flanders, RB, 2011 – 7th, 2012 – 13th, 2013 - 16th
Jeremiah Briscoe, QB, 2016 – Winner, 2017 Winner
Eric Schmid, QB, 2021 - 12th

- Jerry Rice Award
  Most Outstanding FCS Freshman Player

P.J. Hall, DE, 2014 - 3rd
Nathan Stewart, WR, 2016 - 3rd

- Buck Buchanan Award finalists
  Most Outstanding FCS Defensive Player

Keith Davis, DB, 2001 – 7th
Darnell Taylor, S, 2012 – 14th
P. J. Hall, DE, 2016 – 3rd
Derick Roberson, DE, 2018 – 2nd
Jahari Kay, DL, 2020 - 7th, 2021 - 15th

- AFCA Coach of the Year

Willie Fritz, National, 2011
Willie Fritz, Regional, 2011 & 2012

- Eddie Robinson Award
  Coach of the Year

K. C. Keeler – 2016

=== Conference awards ===
Sam Houston has had 750 All-Conference selections and honorable mentions, including 15 in Conference USA, 28 in the Western Athletic Conference, 433 in the Southland Conference, 27 in the Gulf Star Conference, 239 in the Lone Star Conference, and 8 in the Texas Intercollegiate Athletic Association.

- Player of the Year

Lanny Dycus, QB, Gulf Star (1985)
Chris Chaloupka, QB, Southland (1999)
Josh McCown, QB, Southland (2001)
Dustin Long, QB, Southland (2004)
Timothy Flanders, RB, Southland (2011 & 2012)
Jeremiah Briscoe, QB, Southland (2016)
Eric Schmid, QB, Southland (2016)

- Offensive Player of the Year

Chris Chaloupka, QB, Southland (1999)
D. D. Terry, RB, Southland (2006)
Richard Sincere, WR, Southland (2011)
Jared Johnson, QB, Southland (2015)
Yedidiah Louis, WR, Southland (2016)
Davion Davis, WR, Southland (2017)

- Defensive Player of the Year

Keith Davis, DB, Southland (2000)
Darnell Taylor, S, Southland (2011 & 2012)
P.J. Hall, DE, Southland (2016)
Kavian Gaither, LB, WAC (2022)

- Freshman of the Year

Bart Bradley, P, Gulf Star (1986)
Victor McKnight, C, Southland (1996)
Matt Dominguez, WR, Southland (1997)
P.J. Hall, DE, Southland (2014)
Nathan Stewart, WR, Southland (2016)
Kamren Washington, DL, WAC (2021)
DJ McKinney, RB, Conference USA (2024)

- Newcomer of the Year

Tim Denton, DB, Southland (1995)
Chris Chaloupka, QB, Southland (1999)
Timothy Flanders, RB, Southland (2010)
Trace Mascorro, DL, Southland (2019)
Jequez Ezzard, WR, Southland (2020)

- Coach of the Year

Ron Randleman, Gulf Star (1986)
Ron Randleman, Southland (1991 & 2001)
Willie Fritz, Southland (2011)
K. C. Keeler, Southland (2016 & 2020)
K. C. Keeler, WAC (2021)

== Individual program records ==
=== Rushing records ===
- Most rushing attempts, career: 999, Timothy Flanders (2010–2013)
- Most rushing attempts, season: 298, Timothy Flanders (2011)
- Most rushing attempts, game: 39, Charles Harris vs North Texas (1993)
- Most rushing yards, career: 5,664, Timothy Flanders (2010–2013)
- Most rushing yards, season: 1,644, Timothy Flanders (2011)
- Most rushing yards, game: 287, Timothy Flanders vs Montana (2011)
- Most rushing touchdowns, career: 66, Timothy Flanders (2010–2013)
- Most rushing touchdowns, season: 22, Timothy Flanders (2011)
- Most rushing touchdowns, game: 5, Timothy Flanders (September 20, 2011, vs. New Mexico)
- Longest rush from scrimmage: 90 yards, Charles Harris vs Rice (1993), Arthur Louis vs SFA (1978), Dennis Gann vs Texas A&I (1966)
- Most games with at least 100 rushing yards, career: 30, Timothy Flanders (2010–2013)
- Most games with at least 100 rushing yards, season: 10, Timothy Flanders (2012)
- Most games with at least 200 rushing yards, career: 2, Charles Harris (1993), D. D. Terry (2006), Timothy Flanders (2011–2012)
- Most games with at least 200 rushing yards, season: 2, Charles Harris (1993, D. D. Terry (2006)

=== Passing records ===
- Most passing attempts, career: 1,328, Jeremiah Briscoe (2015–17)
- Most passing attempts, season: 579, Jeremiah Briscoe (2017)
- Most passing attempts, game: 69, Rhett Bomar vs Southeastern Louisiana (2008)
- Most passing completions, career: 1,328, Jeremiah Briscoe (2015–17)
- Most passing completions, season: 333, Dustin Long (2004)
- Most passing completions, game: 38, Dustin Long vs Eastern Washington at FCS Quarterfinals (2004)
- Most passing yards, career: 11,488, Jeremiah Briscoe (2015–17)
- Most passing yards, season: 5,003, Jeremiah Briscoe (2004)
- Most passing yards, game: 577, Dustin Long vs McNeese State (2004)
- Most passing touchdowns, career: 116, Jeremiah Briscoe (2015–17)
- Most passing touchdowns, season: 57, Jeremiah Briscoe (2016)
- Most passing touchdowns, game: 7, Jeremiah Briscoe (2016)
- Longest pass completion: 99 yards, Binky Ford to Frankie Reescano vs Howard Payne University (1980)
- Most games with at least 300 passing yards, season: 11, Jeremiah Briscoe (2016)
- Most victories as a starting quarterback: 39, Brian Bell (2010–2013)

=== Receiving records ===
- Most receptions, career: 294, Yedidiah Louis (2014–2017)
- Most receptions, season: 99, Jarrod Fuller (2004)
- Most receptions, game: 13, Four Times: Jason Mathenia (2004), Torrance Williams (2013), Davion Davis (2017, 2018)
- Most receiving yards, career: 3,942, Yedidiah Louis (2014–2017)
- Most receiving yards, season: 1,648, Nathan Stewart (2017)
- Most receiving yards, game: 268, Nathan Stewart vs McNeese (2016)
- Most touchdown receptions, career: 40, Davion Davis (2015–2018)
- Most touchdown receptions, season: 18, Jonathon Cooper (2001)
- Most touchdown receptions, game: 4, Matt Dominguez vs Nicholls State (1999)
- Longest pass reception: 97 yards, Frankie Reescano from Blinky Ford vs Howard Payne (1980)
- Most games with at least 100 receiving yards, career: 16, Nathan Stewart (2016–2019)

=== Defensive records ===
- Most tackles, career: 538, Stan Blinka (1975–1978)
- Most tackles, season: 211, Stan Blinka (1978)
- Most tackles, game: 24, Stan Blinka (1978 vs Stephen F. Austin)
- Most sacks, career: 42, P. J. Hall (2014–2017)
- Most sacks, season: 15, Andre Finley (1988)
- Most sacks, game: 4, Michael Bankston (1991 vs Angelo State), Will Henry (2010 vs Nicholls State)
- Most interceptions, career: 14, Daxton Swanson (2009–2012)
- Most interceptions, season: 8, Daxton Swanson (2011)
- Most interceptions, game: 3, Charles Stanley vs. Howard Payne (1977), Mark Hughes vs. McNeese State (2004)

== Future non-conference opponents ==
Future non-conference opponents announced as of November 10, 2026.

| 2027 | 2028 | 2029 | 2030 | 2031 | 2033 |
|---|---|---|---|---|---|
| at Louisiana–Monroe | at Houston | Troy | Georgia Southern | at Tulsa | at UNLV |
| at TCU | Louisiana–Monroe | at Georgia Southern | | Oregon State | |
| | | at Kansas State | | | |
