= 2016 Sam Houston State Bearkats football team =

American college football season

2016 Sam Houston State Bearkats football

Southland Conference champion

FCS Playoffs Quarterfinals, L 7–65 vs. James Madison
- Conference: Southland Conference

Ranking
- STATS: No. 5
- FCS Coaches: No. 5
- Record: 12–1 (9–0 Southland)
- Head coach: K. C. Keeler (3rd season)
- Offensive coordinator: Phil Longo (3rd season)
- Offensive scheme: Air raid
- Defensive coordinator: Brad Sherrod (3rd season)
- Base defense: 3–4
- Home stadium: Bowers Stadium

2016 Southland Conference football standings
	Conf.			Overall
Team	W		L	W		L
No. 5 Sam Houston State $^	9	–	0	12	–	1
No. 14 Central Arkansas ^	8	–	1	10	–	3
SE Louisiana	7	–	2	7	–	4
McNeese State	5	–	4	6	–	5
Nicholls State	5	–	4	5	–	6
Stephen F. Austin	4	–	5	5	–	6
Houston Baptist	3	–	5	4	–	7
Incarnate Word *	3	–	6	3	–	8
Lamar	3	–	6	3	–	8
Abilene Christian *	2	–	7	2	–	9
Northwestern State	0	–	9	1	–	10
$ – Conference champion; ^ – FCS playoff participant; * – ineligible for FCS playoffs due to transition from NCAA Division II; Rankings from STATS poll

The 2016 Sam Houston State Bearkats football team represented Sam Houston State University in the 2016 NCAA Division I FCS football season. The Bearkats were led by third-year head coach K. C. Keeler and played their home games at Bowers Stadium. They were a member of the Southland Conference. They finished the season 12–1 overall and 9–0 in Southland play to win the Southland Conference title. They went undefeated during the regular season with a record of 11–0. They received the Southland's automatic bid to the FCS Playoffs where they defeated Chattanooga the second round, only to lose in the quarterfinals to James Madison.

== Schedule ==
Date	Time	Opponent	Rank	Site	TV	Result	Attendance
September 3	6:00 pm	Oklahoma Panhandle State*	No. 2	Bowers Stadium; Huntsville, TX	ESPN3	W 59–21	8,609
September 17	7:00 pm	at Lamar	No. 3	Provost Umphrey Stadium; Beaumont, TX	ESPN3	W 44–31	8,343
September 24	7:00 pm	at Houston Baptist	No. 2	Husky Stadium; Houston, TX	FCS	W 52–16	3,134
October 1	3:00 pm	vs. Stephen F. Austin	No. 2	NRG Stadium; Houston, TX (Battle of the Piney Woods)	ESPN3	W 63–28	27,411
October 8	6:00 pm	at Incarnate Word	No. 2	Gayle and Tom Benson Stadium; San Antonio, TX	ESPN3/UIWtv	W 63–48	5,322
October 15	3:00 pm	Abilene Christian^{†}	No. 2	Bowers Stadium; Huntsville, TX	ESPN3	W 48–21	8,314
October 22	3:00 pm	at Nicholls State	No. 1	Manning Field at John L. Guidry Stadium; Thibodaux, LA	ASN	W 38–21	7,759
October 29	6:00 pm	Texas Southern*	No. 1	Bowers Stadium; Huntsville, TX	ESPN3	W 66–17	8,611
November 5	6:00 pm	McNeese State	No. 1	Bowers Stadium; Huntsville, TX	ESPN3	W 56–43	8,025
November 12	6:00 pm	at Northwestern State	No. 1	Harry Turpin Stadium; Natchitoches, LA	ESPN3	W 48–16	6,421
November 19	2:30 pm	No. 11 Central Arkansas	No. 1	Bowers Stadium; Huntsville, TX	ESPN3	W 59–23	9,182
December 3	2:00 pm	No. 11 Chattanooga*	No. 1	Bowers Stadium; Huntsville, TX (NCAA Division I Second Round)	ESPN3	W 41–36	4,897
December 9	6:00 pm	at No. 5 James Madison*	No. 1	Bridgeforth Stadium; Harrisonburg, VA (NCAA Division I Quarterfinal)	ESPN2	L 7–65	15,646
*Non-conference game; ^{†}Homecoming; Rankings from STATS Poll released prior to the game; All times are in Central time

== Game summaries ==
=== Oklahoma Panhandle State ===
Oklahoma Panhandle State at Sam Houston State

Team	1	2	3	4	Total
Aggies	14	0	0	7	21
• #2 Bearkats	21	17	7	14	59

- Date: September 3
- Location: Bowers Stadium
  Huntsville, TX
- Game start: 6:00 PM CDT
- Elapsed time: 3:30
- Game attendance: 8,609
- Game weather: 89 °F (32 °C) • Wind NE 4 mph (6.4 km/h) • Mostly cloudy, warm
- Referee: Ross Smith
- Television network: ESPN3

Scoring summary
1	8:03	Sam Houston State	Yedidiah Louis 23 yard pass from Jeremi Briscoe (Luc Swimberghe kick), Drive: 2 plays, 30 yards, 0:31	7–0
1	2:40	Sam Houston State	Deo Hutchinson 32 yard pass from Jeremi Briscoe (Luc Swimberghe kick), Drive: 10 plays, 72 yards, 2:53	14–0
1	2:25	Oklahoma Panhandle State	Devyn Williams 90 yard kickoff return (Sterling Claphan kick), Drive: 0 plays, 0 yards, 0:00	14–7
1	1:17	Sam Houston State	Avery, Corey 15 yard run (Luc Swimberghe kick), Drive: 5 plays, 76 yards, 1:08	21–7
1	0:07	Oklahoma Panhandle State	Andrew Hernandez 69 yard pass from Shane Truelove (Sterling Claphan kick), Drive: 3 plays, 78 yards, 1:06	21–14
2	13:15	Sam Houston State	Tre Honshtein 23 yard field goal, Drive: 7 plays, 35 yards, 1:45	24–14
2	11:04	Sam Houston State	Corey Avery 21 yard pass from Jeremi Briscoe (Tre Honshtein kick), Drive: 4 plays, 50 yards, 0:47	31–14
2	5:05	Sam Houston State	Javin Webb 9 yard run (Tre Honshtein kick), Drive: 9 plays, 77 yards, 2:48	38–14
3	10:15	Sam Houston State	Jeremiah Briscoe 8 yard run (Tre Honshtein kick), Drive: 11 plays, 52 yards, 2:55	45–14
4	13:10	Oklahoma Pandle State	Andrew Hernandez 35 yard pass from D.J. Scott (Sterling Claphan kick), Drive: 1 play, 30 yards, 0:10	45–21
4	11:58	Sam Houston State	Coree Compton 23 yard pass from Caleb Griffin (Tre Honshtein kick), Drive: 3 plays, 40 yards, 1:03	52–21
4	4:58	Sam Houston State	Jordan Brown 1 yard run (Tre Honshtein kick), Drive: 6 plays, 46 yards, 1:38	59–21

=== @ Lamar ===
Sam Houston State at Lamar

Team	1	2	3	4	Total
• #3 Bearkats	14	16	7	7	44
Cardinals	3	0	14	14	31

- Date: September 17
- Location: Provost Umphrey Stadium
  Beaumont, TX
- Game start: 7:00 PM CDT
- Elapsed time: 3:40
- Game attendance: 8,343
- Game weather: 92 °F (33 °C) • Hot and humid
- Referee: Marvel July
- Television network: ESPN3

Scoring summary
1	13:32	Sam Houston State	Corey Avery 9 yard run (Luc Swimberghe kick), Drive: 5 plays, 75 yards, 1:29	7–0
1	3:32	Lamar	Alex Ball 44 yard field goal, Drive: 18 plays, 54 yards, 7:38	7–3
1	2:07	Sam Houston State	Corey Avery 35 yard pass from Briscoe, Jeremi (Swimberghe, Luc kick), Drive: 5 plays, 86 yards, 1:16	14–3
2	5:27	Sam Houston State	P. J. Hall -8 yard safety, Drive: 2 plays, -8 yards, 0:39	16–3
2	4:54	Sam Houston State	Derrick Dick 35 yard pass from Briscoe, Jeremi (Luc Swimberghe kick), Drive: 2 plays, 65 yards, 0:33	23–3
2	1:32	Sam Houston State	Remus Bulmer 4 yard run (Luc Swimberghe kick), Drive: 4 plays, 75 yards, 1:10	30–3
3	13:37	Lamar	Zae Giles 56 yard pass from Andrew Allen (Ball, Alex kick), Drive: 5 plays, 79 yards, 1:19	30–10
3	3:50	Sam Houston State	Tyler Scott 14 yard pass from Briscoe, Jeremi (Luc Swimberghe kick), Drive: 4 plays, 50 yards, 1:38	37–10
3	0:47	Lamar	Brenda Langley 55 yard run (Alex Ball kick), Drive: 6 plays, 74 yards, 2:58	37–17
4	6:00	Lamar	Carson Earp 67 yard run (Alex Ball kick), Drive: 7 plays, 99 yards, 2:56	37–24
4	3:37	Sam Houston State	Javin Webb 2 yard run (Luc Swimberghe kick), Drive: 8 plays, 51 yards, 2:22	44–24
4	0:48	Lamar	Kendrick King 34 yard pass from Andrew Allen (Alex Ball kick), Drive: 8 plays, 74 yards, 2:41	44–31

=== @ Houston Baptist ===
Sam Houston State at Houston Baptist

Team	1	2	3	4	Total
• #2 Bearkats	21	10	7	14	52
Huskies	0	6	10	0	16

- Date: September 24
- Location: Husky Stadium
  Houston, TX
- Game start: 7:00 pm CDT
- Elapsed time: 3:26
- Game attendance: 3,134
- Game weather: 85 °F (29 °C) • Wind ESE 6 mph (9.7 km/h) • Mostly cloudy
- Referee: Ross Smith
- Television network: FCS

Scoring summary
1	13:04	Sam Houston State	Javin Webb 1 yard run (Luc Swimberghe kick), Drive: 9 plays, 75 yards, 1:56	7–0
1	6:23	Sam Houston State	Yedidiah Louis 48 yard pass from Jeremiah Briscoe (Luc Swimberghe kick), Drive: 5 plays, 87 yards, 0:58	14–0
1	2:42	Sam Houston State	Javin Webb 13 yard run (Luc Swimberghe kick), Drive: 7 plays, 82 yards, 2:01	21–0
2	13:06	Sam Houston State	Nathan Stewart 8 yard pass from Jeremiah Briscoe (Luc Swimberghe kick), Drive: 3 plays, 51 yards, 0:41	28–0
2	10:07	Houston Baptist	Alec Chadwick 21 yard field goal, Drive: 8 plays, 71 yards, 2:59	28–3
2	7:20	Sam Houston State	Luc Swimberghe 29 yard field goal, Drive: 8 plays, 60 yards, 2:41	31–3
2	2:13	Houston Baptist	Alec Chadwick 46 yard field goal, Drive: 11 plays, 51 yards, 5:00	31–6
3	12:16	Houston Baptist	Alec Chadwick 24 yard field goal, Drive: 13 plays, 68 yards, 2:44	31–9
3	5:46	Houston Baptist	Mev Ajdin 12 yard pass from Tony Dawson (Alec Chadwick kick), Drive: 9 plays, 80 yards, 3:38	31–16
3	3:25	Sam Houston State	Davion Davis 17 yard pass from Jeremiah Briscoe (Luc Swimberghe kick), Drive: 2 plays, 45 yards, 0:22	38–16
4	14:16	Sam Houston State	Remus Bulmer 1 yard run (Luc Swimberghe kick), Drive: 10 plays, 77 yards, 2:31	45–16
4	9:26	Sam Houston State	Remus Bulmer 13 yard run (Luc Swimberghe kick), Drive: 8 plays, 75 yards, 3:23	52–16

=== Stephen F. Austin ===
Battle of the Piney Woods

Team	1	2	3	4	Total
• #2 Bearkats	28	14	21	0	63
Lumberjacks	0	7	14	7	28

- Date: October 1
- Location: NRG Stadium
  Houston, TX
- Game start: 3:00 PM CDT
- Elapsed time: 3:35
- Game attendance: 27,411
- Game weather: Indoors • 79 °F (26 °C) outside • Calm wind
- Referee: Michael VanderVelde
- Television network: ESPN3

Scoring summary
1	9:20	Sam Houston State	Yedidiah Louis 37 yard pass from Jeremiah Briscoe (Luc Swimberghe kick), Drive: 4 plays, 53 yards, 0:44	7–0
1	6:48	Sam Houston State	Davion Davis 57 yard pass from Jeremiah Briscoe (Luc Swimberghe kick), Drive: 2 plays, 57 yards, 0:40	14–0
1	5:28	Sam Houston State	Corey Avery 7 yard run (Luc Swimberghe kick), Drive: 3 plays, 18 yards, 1:16	21–0
1	2:39	Sam Houston State	Nathan Stewart 73 yard pass from Jeremiah Briscoe (Luc Swimberghe kick), Drive: 2 plays, 79 yards, 0:39	28–0
2	12:13	Sam Houston State	Nathan Stewart 39 yard pass from Jeremiah Briscoe (Luc Swimberghe kick), Drive: 5 plays, 50 yards, 2:00	35–0
2	10:23	Stephen F. Austin	Jabralon Allen 18 yard pass from Zach Conque (Storm Ruiz kick), Drive: 8 plays, 70 yards, 1:50	35–7
2	7:29	Sam Houston State	Yedidiah Louis 17 yard pass from Jeremiah Briscoe (Luc Swimberghe kick), Drive: 8 plays, 68 yards, 2:54	42–7
3	12:05	Stephen F. Austin	Justice Liggins 1 yard pass from Zach Conque (Storm Ruiz kick), Drive: 10 plays, 75 yards, 2:55	42–14
3	10:22	Sam Houston State	Collin Rison 16 yard pass from Jeremiah Briscoe (Luc Swimberghe kick), Drive: 4 plays, 64 yards, 1:43	49–14
3	7:56	Sam Houston State	Corey Avery 21 yard run (Luc Swimberghe kick), Drive: 5 plays, 69 yards, 1:42	56–14
3	6:45	Stephen F. Austin	Tamrick Pace 34 yard pass from Hunter Taylor (Storm Ruiz kick), Drive: 6 plays, 75 yards, 1:11	56–21
3	1:55	Sam Houston State	Deon Hutchinson 2 yard pass from Jeremiah Briscoe (Luc Swimberghe kick), Drive: 10 plays, 73 yards, 4:50	63–21
4	7:53	Stephen F. Austin	Loren Easly 7 yard run (Storm Ruiz kick), Drive: 13 plays, 57 yards, 3:54	63–28

=== @ Incarnate Word ===
Sam Houston State at Incarnate Word

Team	1	2	3	4	Total
• #2 Bearkats	21	14	21	7	63
Cardinals	7	14	14	13	48

- Date: October 8
- Location: Gayle and Tom Benson Stadium
  San Antonio, TX
- Game start: 6:00 PM CDT
- Elapsed time: 3:30
- Game attendance: 5,322
- Game weather: 78 °F (26 °C) • Wind 9 mph (14 km/h) • Mostly Sunny
- Referee: Dan Lewis
- Television network: ESPN3, UIWtv
Sources: Box Score

Scoring summary
1	13:54	Sam Houston State	Davion Davis 12 yard pass from Jeremi Briscoe (Luc Swimberghe kick), Drive: 5 plays, 46 yards, 1:06	7–0
1	11:06	Sam Houston State	Corey Avery 54 yard run (Luc Swimberghe kick), Drive: 1 play, 54 yards, 0:09	14–0
1	4:08	Incarnate Word	Kody Edwards 13 yard pass from Trent Brittain (Cody Seidel kick), Drive: 15 plays, 86 yards, 6:51	14–7
1	3:23	Sam Houston State	Davion Davis 80 yard pass from Jeremi Briscoe (Luc Swimberghe kick), Drive: 2 plays, 83 yards, 0:33	21–7
2	11:45	Incarnate Word	Kody Edwards 44 yard pass from Trent Brittain (Cody Seidel kick), Drive: 6 plays, 83 yards, 2:18	21–14
2	3:47	Incarnate Word	Trent Brittain 2 yard run (Cody Seidel kick), Drive: 12 plays, 73 yards, 5:24	21–21
2	2:08	Sam Houston State	Remus Bulmer 4 yard run (Luc Swimberghe kick), Drive: 5 plays, 27 yards, 1:35	28–21
2	0:30	Sam Houston State	Nathan Steward 12 yard pass from Jeremi Briscoe (Luc Swimberghe kick), Drive: 4 plays, 25 yards, 0:26	35–21
3	10:54	Incarnate Word	Jamari Gilbert 26 yard pass from Trent Brittain (Cody Seidel kick), Drive: 10 plays, 65 yards, 4:06	35–28
3	8:13	Sam Houston State	Corey Avery 1 yard run (Luc Swimberghe kick), Drive: 8 plays, 56 yards, 2:33	42–28
3	6:18	Incarnate Word	Broderick Reeves 25 yard run (Cody Seidel kick), Drive: 5 plays, 60 yards, 1:45	42–35
3	4:17	Sam Houston State	Corey Avery 1 yard run (Luc Swimberghe kick), Drive: 5 plays, 67 yards, 1:53	49–35
3	0:00	Sam Houston State	Corey Avery 56 yard run (Luc Swimberghe kick), Drive: 5 plays, 78 yards, 1:54	56–35
4	10:48	Sam Houston State	Tyler Scott 5 yard pass from Jeremi Briscoe (Luc Swimberghe kick), Drive: 5 plays, 60 yards, 2:03	63–35
4	6:13	Incarnate Word	Kody Edwards 43 yard pass from Trent Brittain (Cyril Clarke rush failed), Drive: 8 plays, 75 yards, 4:35	63–41
4	0:48	Incarnate Word	Daryl Brooks 36 yard pass from Taylor Laird (Cody Seidel kick), Drive: 6 plays, 80 yards, 2:53	63–48

=== Abilene Christian ===
Abilene Christian at Sam Houston State (homecoming)

Team	1	2	3	4	Total
Wildcats	0	0	7	14	21
• #2 Bearkats	7	20	21	0	48

- Date: October 15
- Location: Bowers Stadium
  Huntsville, TX
- Game start: 3:00 PM CST
- Elapsed time: 3:32
- Game attendance: 8,319
- Game weather: 88 °F (31 °C) • Wind S 9 mph (14 km/h) • Sunny
- Referee: Kevin Boutmann
- Television network: ESPN3

Scoring summary
1	0:27	Sam Houston State	Nathan Stewart 69 yard pass from Jeremiah Briscoe (Luc Swimberghe kick), Drive: 4 plays, 78 yards, 1:37	7–0
2	13:30	Sam Houston State	Nathan Stewart 16 yard pass from Jeremiah Briscoe (Luc Swimberghe kick failed), Drive: 3 plays, 42 yards, 0:39	13–0
2	6:45	Sam Houston State	Hayden Cagle 2 yard pass from Jeremiah Briscoe (Luc Swimberghe kick), Drive: 11 plays, 76 yards, 4:17	20–0
2	0:50	Sam Houston State	Tyler Scott 15 yard pass from Jeremiah Briscoe (Luc Swimberghe kick), Drive: 5 plays, 27 yards, 1:15	27–0
3	12:04	Abilene Christian	Josh Fink 8 yard pass from Dallas Sealey (Nik Grau kick), Drive: 8 plays, 75 yards, 2:56	27–7
3	10:01	Sam Houston State	Remus Bulmer 7 yard run (Luc Swimberghe kick), Drive: 6 plays, 75 yards, 2:03	34–7
3	5:27	Sam Houston State	Remus Bulmer 12 yard pass from Jeremiah Briscoe (Luc Swimberghe kick), Drive: 7 plays, 48 yards, 2:33	41–7
3	3:29	Sam Houston State	Deon Hutchinson 4 yard pass from Jeremiah Briscoe (Luc Swimberghe kick), Drive: 3 plays, 12 yards, 1:10	48–7
4	9:16	Abilene Christian	D.J. Fuller 14 yard pass from Dallas Sealey (Nik Grau kick), Drive: 9 plays, 70 yards, 4:19	48–14
4	3:29	Abilene Christian	D.J. Fuller 59 yard pass from Dallas Sealey (Nik Grau kick), Drive: 5 plays, 80 yards, 2:13	48–21

=== @ Nicholls ===
Sam Houston State at Nicholls

Team	1	2	3	4	Total
• #1 Bearkats	10	14	7	7	38
Colonels	0	0	14	7	21

- Date: October 22
- Location: John L. Guidry Stadium
  Thibodaux, LA
- Game start: 3:00 PM CDT
- Elapsed time: 2:09
- Game attendance: 7,759
- Game weather: 70 °F (21 °C) • Slight wind • Nice
- Referee: Michael VanderVelde
- Television network: ASN

Scoring summary
1	6:52	Sam Houston State	Luc Swimberghe 41 yard field goal, Drive: 7 plays, 19 yards, 2:19	3–0
1	0:16	Sam Houston State	Javin Webb 1 yard run (Luc Swimberghe kick), Drive: 9 plays, 57 yards, 3:04	10–0
2	7:57	Sam Houston State	Remus Bulmer 3 yard run (Luc Swimberghe kick), Drive: 13 plays, 68 yards, 3:49	17–0
2	0:48	Sam Houston State	Derrick Dick 40 yard pass from Jeremiah Briscoe (Luc Swimberghe kick), Drive: 8 plays, 80 yards, 2:37	24–0
3	9:03	Nicholls	C.J. Okpalobi 16 yard run (David McKey kick), Drive: 13 plays, 75 yards, 5:51	24–7
3	4:05	Sam Houston State	Deon Hutchinson 1 yard pass from Jeremiah Briscoe (Luc Swimberghe kick), Drive: 12 plays, 78 yards, 4:52	31–7
3	0:18	Nicholls	Chase Fourcade 25 yard run (David McKey kick), Drive: 10 plays, 75 yards, 3:47	31–14
4	10:11	Sam Houston State	Deon Hutchinson 2 yard pass from Jeremiah Briscoe (Luc Swimberghe kick), Drive: 11 plays, 84 yards, 4:59	38–14
4	1:17	Nicholls	C.J. Bates 7 yard pass from Chase Fourcade (David McKey kick), Drive: 12 plays, 67 yards, 0:00	38–21

=== Texas Southern ===
Texas Southern at Sam Houston State

Team	1	2	3	4	Total
Tigers	0	10	0	7	17
• #1 Bearkats	28	17	14	7	66

- Date: October 29
- Location: Bowers Stadium
  Huntsville, TX
- Game start: 6:00 PM CDT
- Elapsed time: 3:27
- Game attendance: 8,611
- Game weather: 84 °F (29 °C) • Wind SSE 6 mph (9.7 km/h) • Clear
- Referee: Vidal Jones
- Television network: ESPN3

Scoring summary
1	12:43	Sam Houston State	Davion Davis 79 yard pass from Jeremiah Briscoe (Luc Swimberghe kick), Drive: 1 play, 79 yards, 0:11	7–0
1	10:13	Sam Houston State	Ragan Henderson 1 yard run (Luc Swimberghe kick), Drive: 3 plays, 46 yards, 0:51	14–0
1	4:56	Sam Houston State	Alfonzo McMillian 19 yard return of blocked punt (Luc Swimberghe kick)	21–0
1	0:57	Sam Houston State	Davion Davis 41 yard pass from Jeremiah Briscoe (Luc Swimberghe kick), Drive: 5 plays, 74 yards, 1:11	28–0
2	13:29	Texas Southern	Brad Woodard 61 yard run (Eric Medina kick), Drive: 5 plays, 89 yards, 2:22	28–7
2	11:46	Sam Houston State	Davion Davis 18 yard pass from Jeremiah Briscoe (Luc Swimberghe kick), Drive: 6 plays, 75 yards, 1:43	35–7
2	3:36	Texas Southern	Eric Medina 45 yard field goal, Drive: 5 plays, 54 yards, 1:40	35–10
2	2:25	Sam Houston State	Yedidiah Louis 40 yard pass from Jeremiah Briscoe (Luc Swimberghe kick), Drive: 4 plays, 75 yards, 1:11	42–10
2	0:48	Sam Houston State	Luc Swimberghe 44 yard field goal, Drive: 6 plays, 15 yards, 1:19	45–10
3	13:52	Sam Houston State	Tyler Scott 6 yard pass from Jeremiah Briscoe (Luc Swimberghe kick), Drive: 4 plays, 30 yards, 0:57	52–10
3	10:39	Sam Houston State	Ragan Henderson 1 yard run (Luc Swimberghe kick), Drive: 5 plays, 50 yards, 1:30	59–10
4	14:13	Texas Southern	Brad Woodard 1 yard run (Eric Medina kick), Drive: 17 plays, 89 yards, 6:59	59–17
4	7:48	Sam Houston State	Deontay Townsend 2 yard run (Luc Swimberghe kick), Drive: 15 plays, 75 yards, 6:25	66–17

=== McNeese State ===
McNeese State at Sam Houston State

Team	1	2	3	4	Total
Cowboys	0	9	21	13	43
• #1 Bearkats	14	14	21	7	56

- Date: November 5
- Location: Bowers Stadium
  Huntsville, TX
- Game start: 6:00 PM CST
- Elapsed time: 3:28
- Game attendance: 8,025
- Game weather: 68 °F (20 °C) • Wind N 4 mph (6.4 km/h) • Overcast
- Referee: Marvel July
- Television network: ESPN3

Scoring summary
1	8:13	Sam Houston State	Davion Davis 28 yard pass from Jeremiah Briscoe (Luc Swimberghe kick), Drive: 7 plays, 80 yards, 2:22	7–0
1	5:27	Sam Houston State	Nathan Stewart 52 yard pass from Jeremiah Briscoe (Luc Swimberghe kick), Drive: 5 plays, 89 yards, 1:37	14–0
2	11:04	McNeese State	Gunnar Raborn 41 yard field goal, Drive: 9 plays, 51 yards, 3:16	14–3
2	9:36	Sam Houston State	Yedidiah Louis 45 yard pass from Jeremiah Briscoe (Luc Swimberghe kick), Drive: 5 plays, 56 yards, 1:23	21–3
2	6:33	Sam Houston State	Ragan Henderson 1 yard run (Luc Swimberghe kick), Drive: 5 plays, 51 yards, 1:34	28–3
2	1:29	McNeese State	Kent Shelby 4 yard pass from James Tabary (two-point run conv. failed), Drive: 12 plays, 75 yards, 5:04	28–9
3	12:39	McNeese State	Justin Pratt 39 yard run (Gunnar Raborn kick), Drive: 5 plays, 75 yards, 2:21	28–16
3	10:13	Sam Houston State	Nathan Stewart 11 yard pass from Jeremiah Briscoe (Luc Swimberghe kick), Drive: 6 plays, 42 yards, 2:17	35–16
3	9:02	McNeese State	Darious Crawley 19 yard pass from James Tabary (Gunnar Raborn kick), Drive: 6 plays, 74 yards, 1:05	35–23
3	5:39	Sam Houston State	Collin Rison 2 yard pass from Jeremiah Briscoe (Luc Swimberghe kick), Drive: 9 plays, 59 yards, 3:18	42–23
3	3:25	McNeese State	Kylon Highshaw 8 yard pass from James Tabary (Gunnar Raborn kick), Drive: 5 plays, 75 yards, 2:14	42–30
3	0:54	Sam Houston State	Nathan Stewart 35 yard pass from Jeremiah Briscoe (Luc Swimberghe kick), Drive: 8 plays, 80 yards, 2:24	49–30
4	11:25	McNeese State	Kent Shelby 11 yard pass from James Tabary (Gunnar Raborn kick blocked), Drive: 13 plays, 77 yards, 4:24	49–36
4	6:57	McNeese State	Tavarious Battiste 55 yard pass from James Tabary (Gunnar Raborn kick), Drive: 3 plays, 68 yards, 1:11	49–43
4	5:42	Sam Houston State	Ragan Henderson 2 yard run (Luc Swimberghe kick), Drive: 4 plays, 81 yards, 1:09	56–43

=== @ Northwestern State ===
Sam Houston State at Northwestern State

Team	1	2	3	4	Total
• #1 Bearkats	20	21	0	7	48
Demons	13	0	3	0	16

- Date: November 12
- Location: Harry Turpin Stadium
  Natchitoches, LA
- Game start: 6:00 PM CDT
- Elapsed time: 3:16
- Game attendance: 6,421
- Game weather: 71 °F (22 °C) • Wind SSE 7 mph (11 km/h) • Calm and cool
- Referee: Ross Smith
- Television network: ESPN3

Scoring summary
1	11:09	Sam Houston State	Nathan Stewart 5 yard pass from Jeremiah Briscoe (Luc Swimberghe kick), Drive: 8 plays, 67 yards, 2:30	7–0
1	10:06	Northwestern State	Bobby Chan-Chan 79 yard pass from J.D. Almond (Eric Piccione kick), Drive: 3 plays, 85 yards, 0:56	7–7
1	7:52	Northwestern State	De'Mard Llorens 14 yard run (Eric Piccione kick blocked), Drive: 6 plays, 51 yards, 2:01	7–13
1	4:38	Sam Houston State	Davion Davis 10 yard pass from Jeremiah Briscoe (Luc Swimberghe kick), Drive: 10 plays, 85 yards, 3:08	14–13
1	0:37	Sam Houston State	Yedidiah Louis 4 yard pass from Jeremiah Briscoe (Luc Swimberghe kick failed), Drive: 7 plays, 58 yards, 1:33	20–13
2	12:29	Sam Houston State	Nathan Stewart 33 yard pass from Jeremiah Briscoe (Luc Swimberghe kick), Drive: 4 plays, 44 yards, 0:59	27–13
2	9:53	Sam Houston State	Corey Avery 1 yard run (Luc Swimberghe kick), Drive: 5 plays, 32 yards, 1:17	34–13
2	3:22	Sam Houston State	Ragan Henderson 13 yard run (Luc Swimberghe kick), Drive: 11 plays, 76 yards, 3:33	41–13
3	3:41	Northwestern State	Eric Piccione 39 yard field goal, Drive: 6 plays, 42 yards, 2:03	41–16
4	14:25	Sam Houston State	Tyler Scott 3 yard pass from Jeremiah Briscoe (Luc Swimberghe kick), Drive: 4 plays, 49 yards, 1:06	48–16

=== Central Arkansas ===
Central Arkansas at Sam Houston State

Team	1	2	3	4	Total
#11 Bears	0	10	6	7	23
• #1 Bearkats	17	21	14	7	59

- Date: November 19
- Location: Bowers Stadium
  Huntsville, TX
- Game start: 2:30 PM CST
- Elapsed time: 3:42
- Game attendance: 9,182
- Game weather: 61 °F (16 °C) • Wind N 7 mph (11 km/h) • Sunny and clear
- Referee: Brad Van Vark
- Television network: ESPN3

Scoring summary
1	12:23	Sam Houston State	Parker Murry 2 yard pass from Jeremiah Briscoe (Luc Swimberghe kick), Drive: 7 plays, 75 yards, 2:37	7–0
1	6:42	Sam Houston State	Luc Swimberghe 23 yard field goal, Drive: 13 plays, 78 yards, 3:42	10–0
1	4:11	Sam Houston State	Collin Rison 3 yard pass from Jeremiah Briscoe (Luc Swimberghe kick), Drive: 7 plays, 39 yards, 2:02	17–0
2	11:21	Central Arkansas	Desmond Smith 14 yard pass from Hayden Hildebrand (Matt Cummins kick), Drive: 13 plays, 70 yards, 4:00	17–7
2	8:11	Sam Houston State	Yedidiah Louis 40 yard pass from Jeremiah Briscoe (Luc Swimberghe kick), Drive: 3 plays, 43 yards, 0:28	24–7
2	4:00	Sam Houston State	Yedidiah Louis 21 yard pass from Jeremiah Briscoe (Luc Swimberghe kick), Drive: 3 plays, 34 yards, 0:42	31–7
2	1:46	Sam Houston State	Jaylen Harris 55 yard pass from Jeremiah Briscoe (Luc Swimberghe kick), Drive: 2 plays, 61 yards, 0:13	38–7
2	0:05	Central Arkansas	Matt Cummins 33 yard field goal, Drive: 10 plays, 40 yards, 1:32	38–10
3	10:24	Sam Houston State	Yedidiah Louis 46 yard pass from Jeremiah Briscoe (Luc Swimberghe kick), Drive: 1 play, 46 yards, 0:10	45–10
3	6:24	Central Arkansas	Jarvis Cooper 1 yard run (Matt Cummins kick failed), Drive: 12 plays, 75 yards, 4:00	45–16
3	3:24	Sam Houston State	Yedidiah Louis 10 yard pass from Jeremiah Briscoe (Luc Swimberghe kick), Drive: 1 play, 10 yards, 0:05	52–16
4	11:45	Sam Houston State	Remus Bulmer 17 yard run (Luc Swimberghe kick), Drive: 11 plays, 75 yards, 4:31	59–16
4	0:19	Central Arkansas	Chandler Dexter 10 yard pass from Hayden Hildebrand (Matt Cummins kick), Drive: 9 plays, 65 yards, 2:16	59–23

== FCS Playoffs ==
=== Second Round–Chattanooga ===
Chattanooga at Sam Houston State

Team	1	2	3	4	Total
#11 Mocs	0	14	10	12	36
• #1 Bearkats	14	7	14	6	41

- Date: December 3
- Location: Bowers Stadium
  Huntsville, TX
- Game start: 2:00 PM CST
- Elapsed time: 3:22
- Game attendance: 4,897
- Game weather: 49 °F (9 °C) • Wind NE 8 mph (13 km/h) • Overcast and drizzly
- Referee: Chris La Mange
- Television network: ESPN3

Scoring summary
1	14:05	Sam Houston State	Yedidiah Louis 31 yard pass from Jeremiah Briscoe (Luc Swimberghe kick), Drive: 5 plays, 72 yards, 0:55	7–0
1	11:04	Sam Houston State	Yedidiah Louis 6 yard pass from Jeremiah Briscoe (Luc Swimberghe kick), Drive: 7 plays, 68 yards, 2:02	14–0
2	14:40	Sam Houston State	Corey Avery 7 yard run (Luc Swimberghe kick), Drive: 4 plays, 14 yards, 0:55	21–0
2	6:18	Chattanooga	Derrick Craine 1 yard run (Henrique Ribeiro kick), Drive: 6 plays, 24 yards, 2:28	21–7
2	5:21	Chattanooga	Nakevion Leslie 14 yard interception return (Henrique Ribeiro kick), Drive: 3 plays, -6 yards, 0:47	21–14
3	11:58	Chattanooga	Xavier Borishade 18 yard pass from Alejandro Bennifield (Henrique Ribeiro kick), Drive: 6 plays, 75 yards, 3:02	21–21
3	6:39	Sam Houston State	Davion Davis 35 yard pass from Jeremiah Briscoe (Luc Swimberghe kick), Drive: 3 plays, 30 yards, 0:19	28–21
3	2:57	Chattanooga	Henrique Ribeiro 43 yard field goal, Drive: 9 plays, 49 yards, 3:42	28–24
3	0:08	Sam Houston State	Yedidiah Louis 23 yard pass from Jeremiah Briscoe (Luc Swimberghe kick), Drive: 7 plays, 65 yards, 2:49	35–24
4	14:29	Chattanooga	Derrick Craine 15 yard run (two-point pass conv. failed), Drive: 3 plays, 75 yards, 0:39	35–30
4	9:42	Chattanooga	Henrique Ribeiro 37 yard field goal, Drive: 8 plays, 44 yards, 3:46	35–33
4	9:02	Sam Houston State	Nathan Stewart 26 yard pass from Jeremiah Briscoe (Luc Swimberghe kick failed), Drive: 2 plays, 79 yards, 0:34	41–33
4	4:36	Chattanooga	Henrique Ribeiro 29 yard field goal, Drive: 9 plays, 63 yards, 4:26	41–36

=== Quarterfinals–James Madison ===
Sam Houston State at James Madison

Team	1	2	3	4	Total
#1 Bearkats	0	0	0	7	7
• #5 Dukes	21	21	23	0	65

- Date: December 9
- Location: Bridgeforth Stadium
  Harrisonburg, VA
- Game start: 6:00 PM CST
- Elapsed time: 3:25
- Game attendance: 15,646
- Game weather: 26 °F (−3 °C) • Wind 5 mph (8.0 km/h) • Clear and light wind
- Referee: Jim Crowley
- Television network: ESPN2

Scoring summary
1	10:16	James Madison	Khalid Abdullah 14 yard run (Tyler Gray kick), Drive: 7 plays, 80 yards, 2:57	0–7
1	5:23	James Madison	Bryan Schor 1 yard run (Tyler Gray kick), Drive: 5 plays, 60 yards, 1:44	0–14
1	3:57	James Madison	Rashard Davis 72 yard punt return (Tyler Gray kick), Drive: 5 plays, 16 yards, 1:26	0–21
2	13:15	James Madison	Bryce Maginley 20 yard return of blocked punt (Tyler Gray kick), Drive: 4 plays, 9 yards, 1:16	0–28
2	10:40	James Madison	Jonathan Kloosterman 10 yard pass from Bryan Schor (Tyler Gray kick), Drive: 5 plays, 79 yards, 1:58	0–35
2	0:36	James Madison	Khalid Abdullah 1 yard run (Tyler Gray kick), Drive: 8 plays, 62 yards, 2:59	0–42
3	12:11	James Madison	Trai Sharp 20 yard run (Tyler Gray kick), Drive: 6 plays, 54 yards, 2:49	0–49
3	6:35	James Madison	Team Safety, Drive: 3 plays, -2 yards, 1:04	0–51
3	3:59	James Madison	Trai Sharp 4 yard run (Tyler Gray kick), Drive: 6 plays, 53 yards, 2:36	0–58
3	3:13	James Madison	Khalid Abdullah 6 yard run (Tyler Gray kick), Drive: 1 play, 6 yards, 0:08	0–65
4	11:49	Sam Houston State	Remus Bulmer 15 yard run (Luc Swimberghe kick), Drive: 10 plays, 90 yards, 3:34	7–65

== Ranking movements ==
Ranking movements Legend: ██ Increase in ranking ██ Decrease in ranking т = Tied with team above or below ( ) = First-place votes
	Week													
Poll	Pre	1	2	3	4	5	6	7	8	9	10	11	12	Final
STATS FCS	2	4	3	2	2	2	2	1 (113)	1 (120)	1 (102)	1 (113)	1 (108)	1 (111)	5
Coaches	2	3–T	3	2	2	2	2	1 (21)	1 (23)	1 (22)	1 (22)	1 (21)	1 (22)	5
FCS Playoffs	Not released									2	5	5	Not released	
