= Mark Farris =

American football player (born 1975)

No. 10 – Texas A&M Aggies
- Position: Quarterback

Personal information
- Born: February 9, 1975 (age 51); Harlingen, Texas, U.S.
- Listed height: 6 ft 2 in (1.88 m)
- Listed weight: 212 lb (96 kg)

Career information
- High school: Angleton (Angleton, Texas)
- College: Texas A&M (1999–2002)

Mark Allen Farris (born February 9, 1975) is an American former college football quarterback for Texas A&M University and a former professional baseball shortstop in the Pittsburgh Pirates minor league system.

== Early life ==
Farris was an all-district quarterback for Angleton High School in 1992 and 1993, and was the district MVP in 1993. He passed for 1,831 yards and 21 TDs as a senior and 1,784 and 14 as a junior. In baseball, he was a three-time all-district selection and made the all-state pick his senior year. Farris also lettered in basketball. He was rated the #3 quarterback in Texas by Dave Campbell's Texas Football magazine in 1993, and was highly recruited in both baseball and football. He signed an NCAA letter of intent with Texas A&M in 1994, but chose instead to sign with the Pittsburgh Pirates after being drafted in the first round of the Major League Baseball draft.

== Baseball career ==
Farris made it as high as AA in the Pirates minor league system, finishing in 1998 with the Carolina Mudcats of the Southern League where he hit .273 with 6 home runs.

== College career ==
=== 1999 season ===
Played in five games as a reserve and completed 6-of-16 passes for 53 yards. Played late in the Aggies' Alamo Bowl appearance against Penn State.

=== 2000 season ===
Started every game at quarterback and had what was, at the time, the most prolific season in school history. Completed 208-of-347 passes (.599) for 2,551 yards with 10 touchdowns and 9 interceptions. Rushed for 116 yards and 2 touchdowns, and even grabbed a 10-yard reception. Threw for over 200 yards seven times and over 300 once. Completed a 93-yard pass to Robert Ferguson against Wyoming, the second-longest pass in school history. Tied an A&M bowl record by connecting on 81.8 percent of his passes (9-of-11) in the Independence Bowl. Was voted team captain by his teammates at the end of the season.

=== 2001 season ===
Completed 203-of-347 pass attempts (.585 percentage) for 2,094 yards and 8 touchdowns while starting all 11 games for the Aggies. Had a two 300-yard plus passing games, including a career-high 341 yards against Wyoming. Had a career-high 3 passing touchdowns against Big 12 North Champion Colorado in Boulder. Completed 9-of-19 passes for 191 yards and a touchdown with no interceptions in the Aggies' 28-9 Galleryfurniture.com Bowl victory over TCU, which included an 82-yard touchdown pass.

=== 2002 season ===
Was inconsistent in the Aggies' opening game against University of Louisiana-Lafayette and shaky in the next game against the Pitt Panthers, being pulled in favor of Dustin Long. With a young, struggling team and two talented underclassman quarterbacks, coach R. C. Slocum chose to go with Long and Reggie McNeal for the remainder of the season. Farris would not see the field again in 2002 and finished the year with 251 yards passing, no touchdowns, and no interceptions. While he was invited to the NFL Scouting Combine, he declined to go pro to focus on his family.
