= Icelander (novel) =

2006 novel by Dustin Long

- Author: Dustin Long
- Language: English
- Genre: Novel
- Publisher: McSweeney's
- Publication date: April 28, 2006
- Publication place: United States
- Media type: Print (Hardcover)
- Pages: 250 pp
- ISBN: 1-932416-51-X
- OCLC: 68966685

Icelander is the debut novel of Dustin Long. It is part of the Rectangulars line of McSweeney's Books. It appeared on the Los Angeles Times best-seller's list.

== Plot ==
The plot primarily follows the adventures of a character known only as Our Heroine as she attempts to solve the mystery of her friend's murder while repeated flashbacks detail her family's past adventures in the underground Icelandic kingdom of Vanaheim.

== Style ==
Though playing on the mystery genre, the book is more in line with the postmodern fiction of Vladimir Nabokov, Thomas Pynchon, Alasdair Gray, and Flann O'Brien.

The author created a real life "Bean Day" website, in reference to the event in the novel.
