= Lac Edwards =

Australian American football player (born 1992)

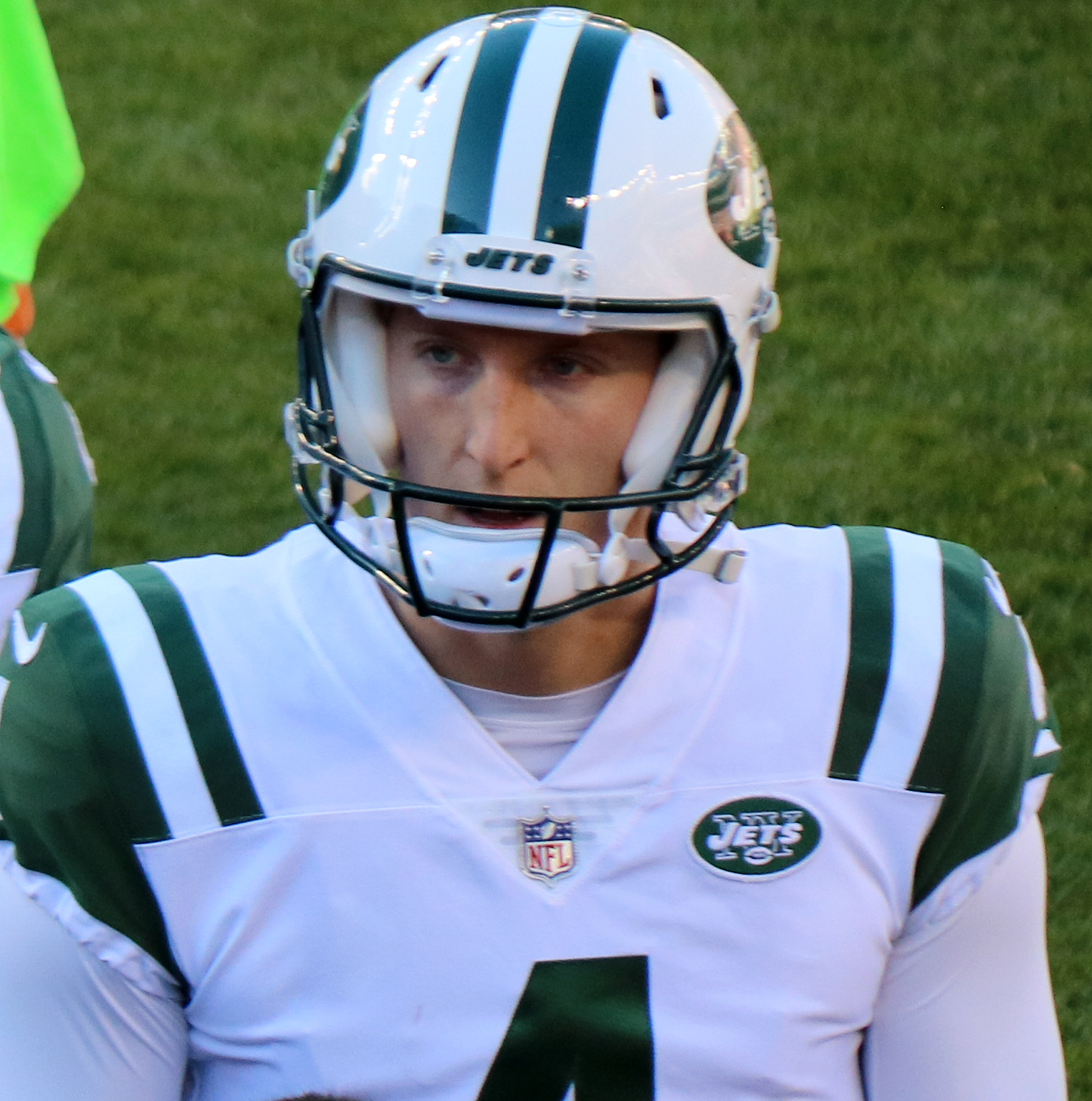
- Edwards with the New York Jets in 2017

No. 4, 10
- Position: Punter

Personal information
- Born: 27 April 1992 (age 34); Hastings, Australia
- Listed height: 6 ft 4 in (1.93 m)
- Listed weight: 209 lb (95 kg)

Career information
- High school: Mornington Secondary College (Mornington, Australia)
- College: Sam Houston State
- NFL draft: 2016: 7th round, 235th overall pick

Career history
- New York Jets (2016–2019); Buffalo Bills (2020)*; Los Angeles Chargers (2020)*; Detroit Lions (2021)*; Carolina Panthers (2021)
- * Offseason or practice squad member only

Awards and highlights
- NFL punting yards leader (2019)

Career NFL statistics
- Punts: 376
- Punting yards: 17,189
- Punting average: 45.7
- Inside 20: 116
- Stats at Pro Football Reference

Lachlan Edwards (born 27 April 1992) is an Australian former professional American football punter. He played college football at Sam Houston State University.

== Early life ==
Edwards was born in Hastings, Victoria, and attended Mornington Secondary College. In his youth, he was a promising player of Australian rules football, winning selection for the Dandenong Stingrays in the TAC Cup (Victoria's under-18 competition). Edwards subsequently went on to the North Ballarat Football Club, who play in the Victorian Football League (VFL). He spent three years on North Ballarat's list, but was unsuccessful in his attempts to be drafted into the Australian Football League (AFL). Prior to emigrating to the United States, Edwards attended the University of Ballarat, where he represented the university in Australian rules football, rugby, cricket, and track and field. He was selected to the 2012 All-Australian University team.

== College career ==
Edwards played college football for the Sam Houston State Bearkats of Sam Houston State University. He was selected to the All-Southland Conference First-team and Sports Network FCS All-America third-team. Edwards led the NCAA with a 44.4 yard punting average.

== Professional career ==
Pre-draft measurables
Height	Weight	Arm length	Hand span
6 ft 4 1/8 in (1.93 m)	209 lb (95 kg)	32 3/8 in (0.82 m)	9 3/8 in (0.24 m)
All values from NFL Combine

=== New York Jets ===
On 30 April 2016, Edwards was drafted by the New York Jets in the seventh round (235th overall) in the 2016 NFL draft. As a rookie in 2016, Edwards appeared in 16 games making 75 punts with 3,236 total punting yards, 24 attempts inside the 20, one attempt blocked, 59 yards at the longest, six landed out of bounds, and four touchbacks. In Week 4, against the Jacksonville Jaguars, he completed his first professional pass attempt, which went for 31 yards to Marcus Williams. Overall, in the 2017 season, he had 94 punts for 4,378 net yards for a 46.57 average.

=== Buffalo Bills ===
Edwards signed with the Buffalo Bills on 19 August 2020, but was waived eight days later.

=== Los Angeles Chargers ===
On 2 December 2020, Edwards was signed to the practice squad of the Los Angeles Chargers. He was released on 7 December. He re-signed to the practice squad on 12 December. He signed a reserve/future contract with the Chargers on 5 January 2021. He was waived on 16 August.

=== Detroit Lions ===
On 25 September 2021, Edwards was signed to the Detroit Lions practice squad, but was released two days later.

=== Carolina Panthers ===
On 26 October 2021, Edwards was signed to the Carolina Panthers practice squad. He was promoted to the active roster on 8 November 2021.

== See also ==
- List of players who have converted from one football code to another
