= Davion Davis =

American football player (born 1996)

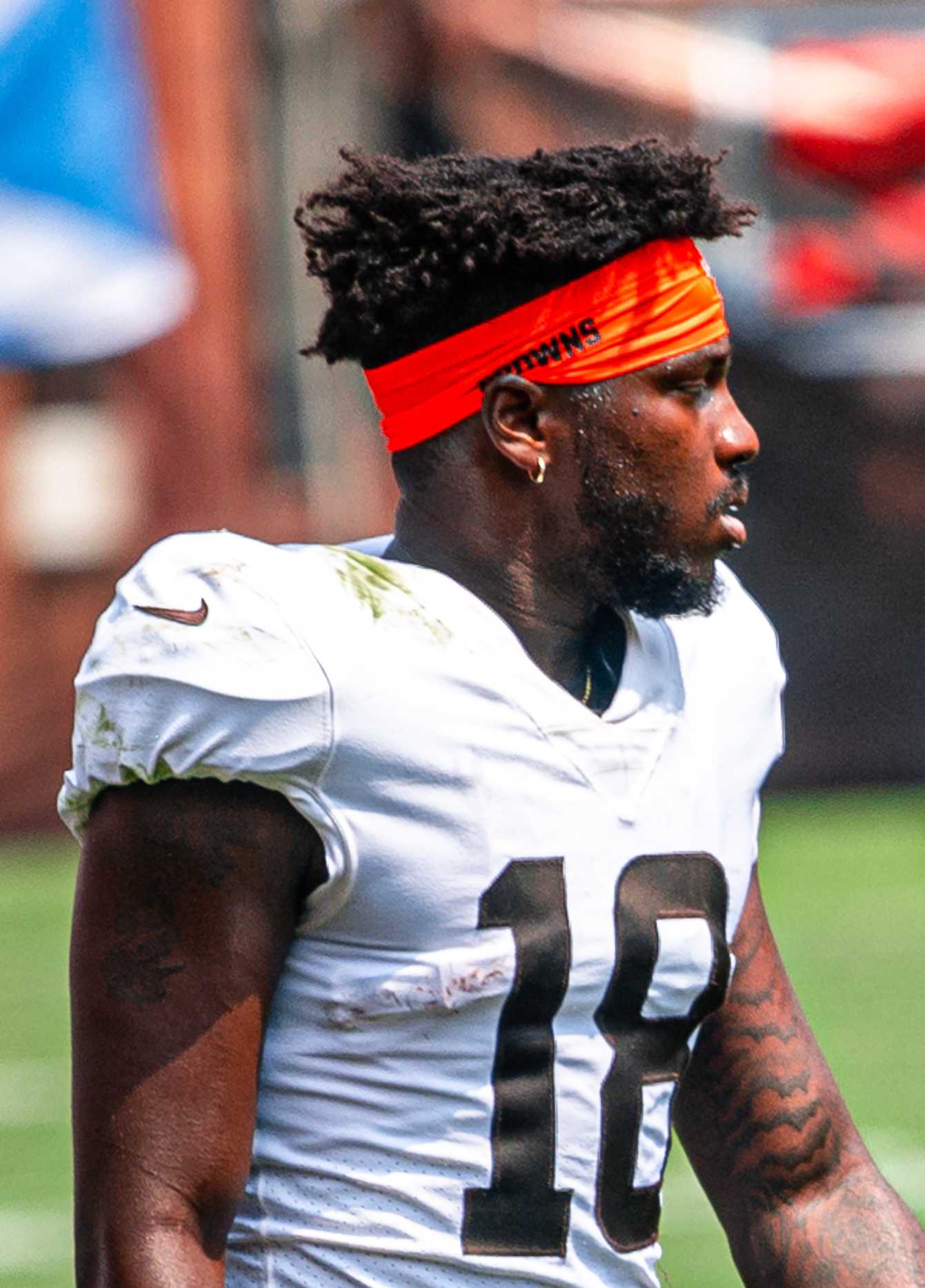
- Davis with the Cleveland Browns in 2021

Profile
- Position: Wide receiver

Personal information
- Born: October 23, 1996 (age 30); Hutto, Texas, U.S.
- Listed height: 5 ft 11 in (1.80 m)
- Listed weight: 199 lb (90 kg)

Career information
- High school: Hutto
- College: Sam Houston State (2015–2018)
- NFL draft: 2019: undrafted

Career history
- Minnesota Vikings (2019); Cleveland Browns (2021); Houston Texans (2021–2022); Houston Roughnecks (2023); Birmingham Stallions (2023); Arizona Cardinals (2023)*; Houston Texans (2023)*; Washington Commanders (2023–2024)*; Birmingham Stallions (2025)
- * Offseason or practice squad member only

Awards and highlights
- USFL champion (2023); First-team FCS All-American (2017); SLC Offensive Player of the Year (2017); 2× first-team All-SLC (2017, 2018); Second-team All-SLC (2016)

Career NFL statistics as of 2023
- Receptions: 1
- Receiving yards: 17
- Stats at Pro Football Reference

Davion Davis (born October 23, 1996) is an American professional football wide receiver. He played college football for the Sam Houston State Bearkats and has also been a member of several other teams.

== College career ==
Davis played four seasons for the Sam Houston State Bearkats. He caught 40 passes for 446 yards and three touchdowns playing the slot receiver position as a freshman. He finished his sophomore season with 56 receptions for 960 yards and 10 touchdowns and was named second-team All-Southland Conference (SLC). As a junior, Davis had 78 receptions for 1,206 yards and 17 touchdowns, eight rushes for 81 yards and 2 touchdowns, and returned six kickoffs for 152 yards and 13 punts for 281 yards and two touchdowns to finish the season with 1720 all-purpose yards and 21 total touchdowns. He was named first-team All-SLC as both a receiver and return specialist and the SLC Offensive player of the year and was named a first-team All-American by the Associated Press, the AFCA and HERO Sports. As a senior, Davis caught 52 passes for 569 yards and 10 touchdowns and was again named first-team All-SLC before missing the final three games of the season due to injury.

== Professional career ==
Pre-draft measurables
Height	Weight	Arm length	Hand span	Wingspan	40-yard dash	10-yard split	20-yard split	20-yard shuttle	Three-cone drill	Vertical jump	Broad jump	Bench press
5 ft 10 5/8 in (1.79 m)	191 lb (87 kg)	31 in (0.79 m)	9 1/2 in (0.24 m)	6 ft 3 3/8 in (1.91 m)	4.64 s	1.65 s	2.69 s	4.07 s	6.90 s	32.0 in (0.81 m)	9 ft 6 in (2.90 m)	15 reps
All values from Pro Day

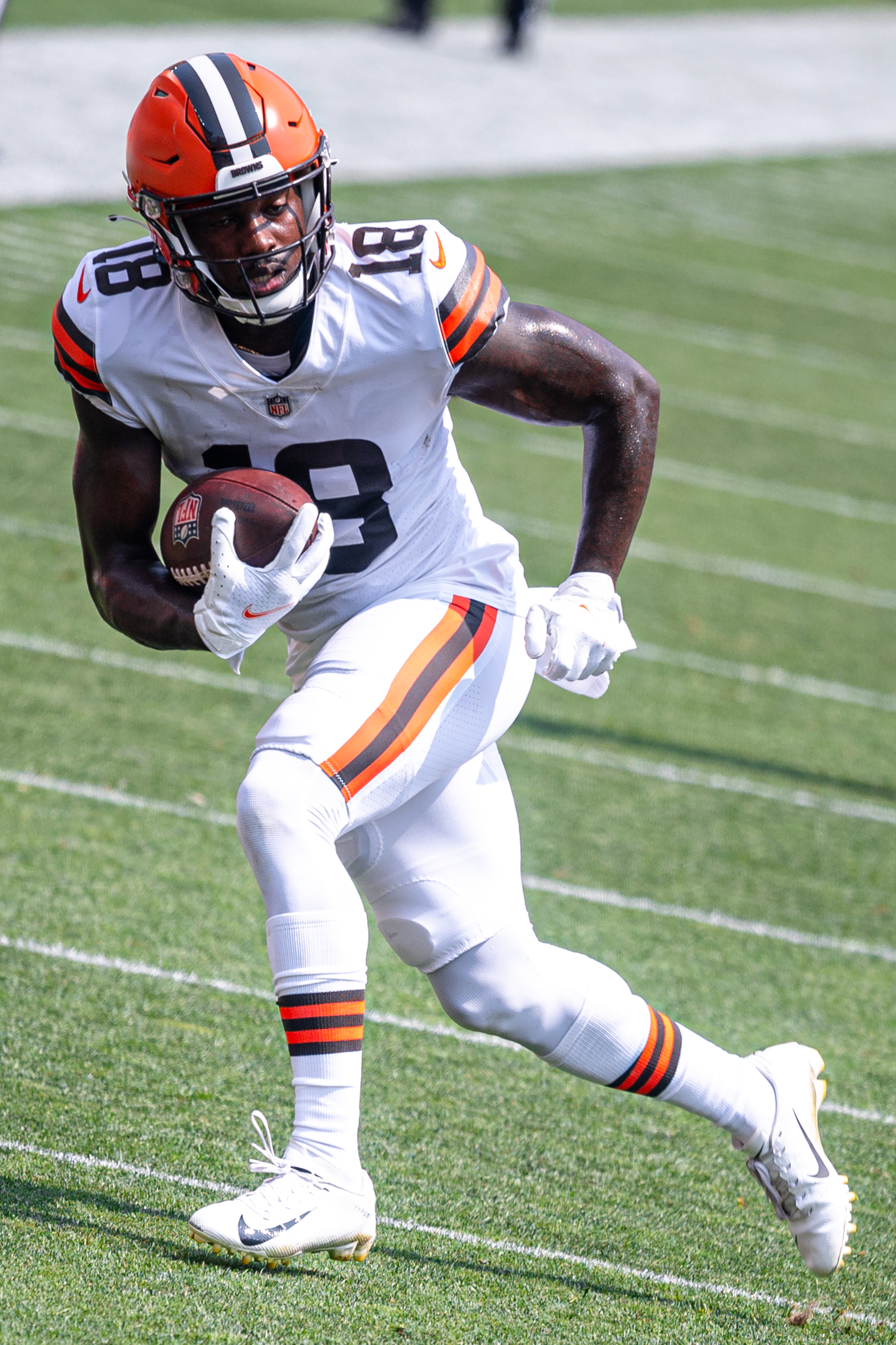
Davis with the Browns in 2021

=== Minnesota Vikings ===
Davis signed with the Minnesota Vikings as an undrafted free agent on April 29, 2019. He was waived by the Vikings during final roster cuts, but was re-signed to the team's practice squad. Davis was promoted to the active roster on September 28, 2019, but did not appear in an NFL game before being waived on October 12, 2019. He was promoted to the active roster again on October 24, 2019, and made his NFL debut that night against the Washington Redskins. He was waived on November 12 and re-signed to the practice squad. He signed a reserve/future contract with the Vikings on January 12, 2020. He was waived on August 3, 2020.

=== Cleveland Browns ===
On July 31, 2021, Davis signed with the Cleveland Browns. He was suspended the first two games of the 2021 season for violating the NFL's substance abuse policy. After being reinstated from suspension, he was waived on September 20, 2021, and re-signed to the practice squad.

=== Houston Texans (first stint) ===
On October 6, 2021, Davis was signed by the Houston Texans off the Browns practice squad. He was placed on injured reserve on December 15. He was waived with an injury designation on August 3, 2022. He cleared waivers and was placed on injured reserve the next day. He was waived off injured reserve on August 12, 2022. He was re-signed to the practice squad on October 5.

=== Houston Roughnecks ===
Davis was released by the Houston Roughnecks of the XFL on March 3, 2023.

=== Birmingham Stallions (first stint) ===
On March 11, 2023, Davis signed with the Birmingham Stallions of the United States Football League (USFL). During his season in Birmingham he helped the team win their second title in a row before he was released from his contract on July 24, 2023, to sign with an NFL team.

=== Arizona Cardinals ===
On July 25, 2023, Davis signed with the Arizona Cardinals. On August 29, 2023, Davis was released by the Cardinals as part of final roster cuts before the start of the 2023 season. He was re-signed to the practice squad on October 25. Davis was released on November 21.

=== Houston Texans (second stint) ===
On December 5, 2023, Davis was signed to the Texans' practice squad. He was released on December 27.

=== Washington Commanders ===
On January 2, 2024, Davis was signed to the Washington Commanders practice squad. He signed a futures contract with the team a week later. Davis was released by the Commanders on August 27.

=== Birmingham Stallions (second stint) ===
On January 22, 2025, Davis re-signed with the Birmingham Stallions of the United Football League (UFL).
