= Jeremiah Briscoe =

American football player (born 1993)

No. 14
- Position: Quarterback

Personal information
- Born: August 15, 1993 (age 33); Houston, Texas, U.S.
- Listed height: 6 ft 3 in (1.91 m)
- Listed weight: 225 lb (102 kg)

Career information
- High school: Stratford (Houston)
- College: UAB (2013–2014); Sam Houston State (2015–2017)
- NFL draft: 2018: undrafted

Career history
- Philadelphia Eagles (2018)*; Edmonton Eskimos (2018–2020)
- * Offseason or practice squad member only

Awards and highlights
- 2× Walter Payton Award (2016, 2017)

Career CFL statistics
- Passing completions: 0
- Passing attempts: 2
- Passing yards: 0
- TD–INT: 0–0
- Stats at CFL.ca

Jeremiah Briscoe (born August 15, 1993) is an American former professional football player who was a quarterback for the Edmonton Eskimos of the Canadian Football League (CFL). He played college football for the Sam Houston State Bearkats, winning the Walter Payton Award twice.

== Early life ==
Originally a three-year letterer at Second Baptist, Briscoe played wide receiver as a sophomore and caught 51 passes for 792 yards and five touchdowns, while playing backup quarterback and throwing for 3 touchdowns. He became the quarterback as a junior passed for 2,358 yards and 23 touchdowns on zero interceptions. Jeremiah transferred to Stratford for his senior year and threw for 1,863 yards and 12 touchdowns on only 3 interceptions, also running for 6 more rushing touchdowns as a senior. Moreso than football, Briscoe actually preferred baseball to football and had a 2.48 ERA with 55 strikeouts in 48 innings pitched.

Considered a three-star recruit by 247sports, Briscoe chose a full-ride scholarship to the University of Alabama at Birmingham over offers from Baylor, Boise State, Lamar, Sam Houston State, Stephen F Austin, Wyoming, and preferred walk-on's from Texas A&M and Ole Miss. He was also recruited by UAB to play baseball, and sought baseball recruitment from Stephen F Austin, Texas A&M, and Baylor.

== College career ==
Briscoe started his college career at UAB in 2014, where he threw for 361 yards and 3 touchdowns in six games, one of which he started. He also played baseball. Briscoe transferred to Sam Houston State University after UAB's football program was cut following his freshman year.

Despite being a sophomore backup at Sam Houston State behind Jared Johnson, Briscoe passed for 1,883 yards and 14 touchdowns in the 2015 season. As a junior in the 2016 season, Briscoe was a full-time starter and won the Walter Payton Award after passing for 4,602 yards and 57 touchdowns, an FCS single-season record until 2022, when Lindsey Scott Jr. threw 60 for Incarnate Word.

As a senior in 2017, Briscoe threw for 5,003 yards and 46 touchdowns, later winning the Walter Payton a second time. He is only the second player in FCS history to win the Walter Payton more than once.

=== Statistics ===
Year	Team	Games		Passing								Rushing			
Year	Team	GP	Record	Comp	Att	Pct	Yards	Avg	TD	Int	Rate	Att	Yards	Avg	TD
2013	UAB	DNP													
2014	UAB	6	0–1	17	47	36.2	361	7.7	3	4	104.7	9	7	0.8	0
2015	Sam Houston State	14	2–1	135	246	54.9	1,883	7.7	14	5	133.9	29	-36	-1.2	0
2016	Sam Houston State	13	12–1	315	503	62.6	4,602	9.1	57	10	172.9	28	-53	-1.9	1
2017	Sam Houston State	14	12–2	335	579	57.9	5,003	8.6	45	16	150.6	6	-27	-4.5	3
Career		47	26−5	802	1,395	57.5	11,849	8.0	119	35	140.5	72	-108	-1.5	4

== Professional career ==
Briscoe was originally invited to a training camp with the Pittsburgh Steelers, but was not signed after camp ended. On April 27, 2018, Briscoe signed with the Philadelphia Eagles. However, Briscoe appeared in only one scrimmage before being cut by the team on August 17, 2018.

On November 7, 2018, Briscoe signed with the Edmonton Eskimos of the Canadian Football League. Briscoe played with the Eskimos for three seasons as a reserve quarterback and practice squad player. He appeared in 10 games throughout his career, where he had two incomplete passes against the Hamilton Tiger-Cats on October 4, 2019. He also had one tackle.

Briscoe retired from football on June 25, 2021.
