= Timothy Flanders =

American gridiron football player (born 1991)

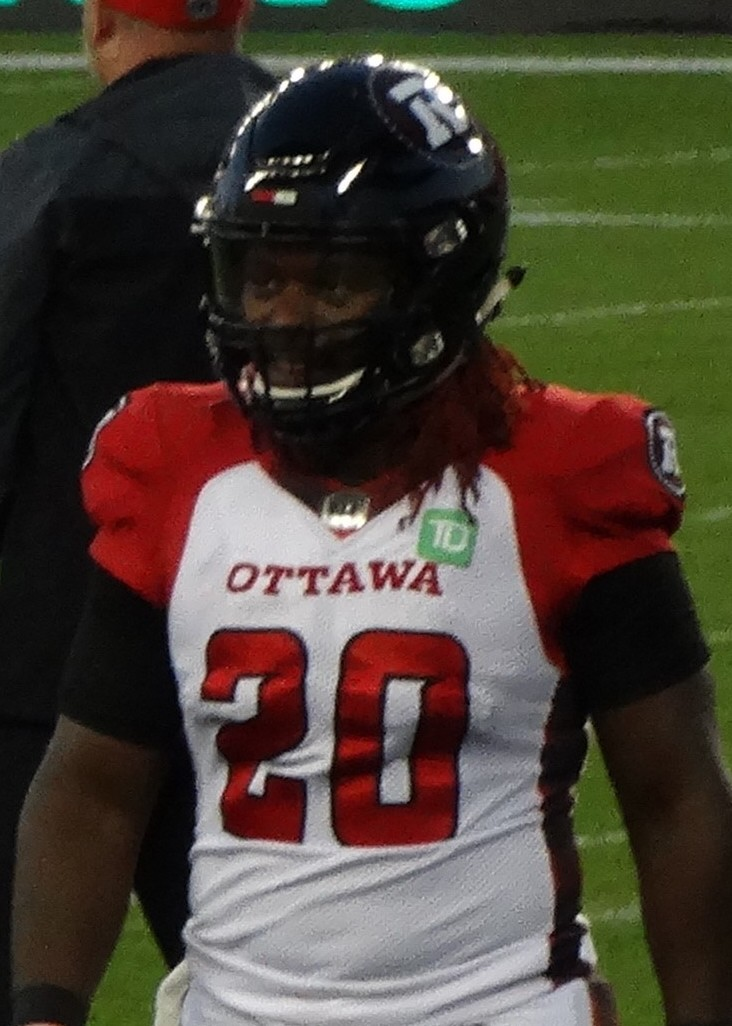
- Flanders with the Ottawa Redblacks in 2021

No. 20
- Position: Running back

Personal information
- Born: September 29, 1991 (age 35); Midwest City, Oklahoma, U.S.
- Listed height: 5 ft 9 in (1.75 m)
- Listed weight: 205 lb (93 kg)

Career information
- College: Sam Houston State

Career history
- 2014: New Orleans Saints*
- 2015: Calgary Stampeders*
- 2015: Cleveland Browns*
- 2015: BC Lions
- 2016–2018: Winnipeg Blue Bombers
- 2019: Calgary Stampeders*
- 2020–2021: Ottawa Redblacks
- * Offseason or practice squad member only

Awards and highlights
- FCS Player of the Year (2011)
- Stats at CFL.ca

Timothy Flanders (born September 29, 1991) is an American former professional football running back. He played in the Canadian Football League (CFL) for the BC Lions, Winnipeg Blue Bombers and Ottawa Redblacks.

== College career ==
Flanders played college football for the Sam Houston State Bearkats from 2010 to 2013. He is the program's all-time leader in career rushing yards and rushing touchdowns.

== Professional career ==
=== New Orleans Saints ===
Upon finishing his collegiate career, Flanders signed as an undrafted free agent with the New Orleans Saints on May 10, 2014. However, he did not make the final roster and was released on August 21, 2014.

=== Calgary Stampeders (first stint) ===
The following year, Flanders signed with the Calgary Stampeders on March 18, 2015, but was released prior to training camp on May 2, 2015.

=== Cleveland Browns ===
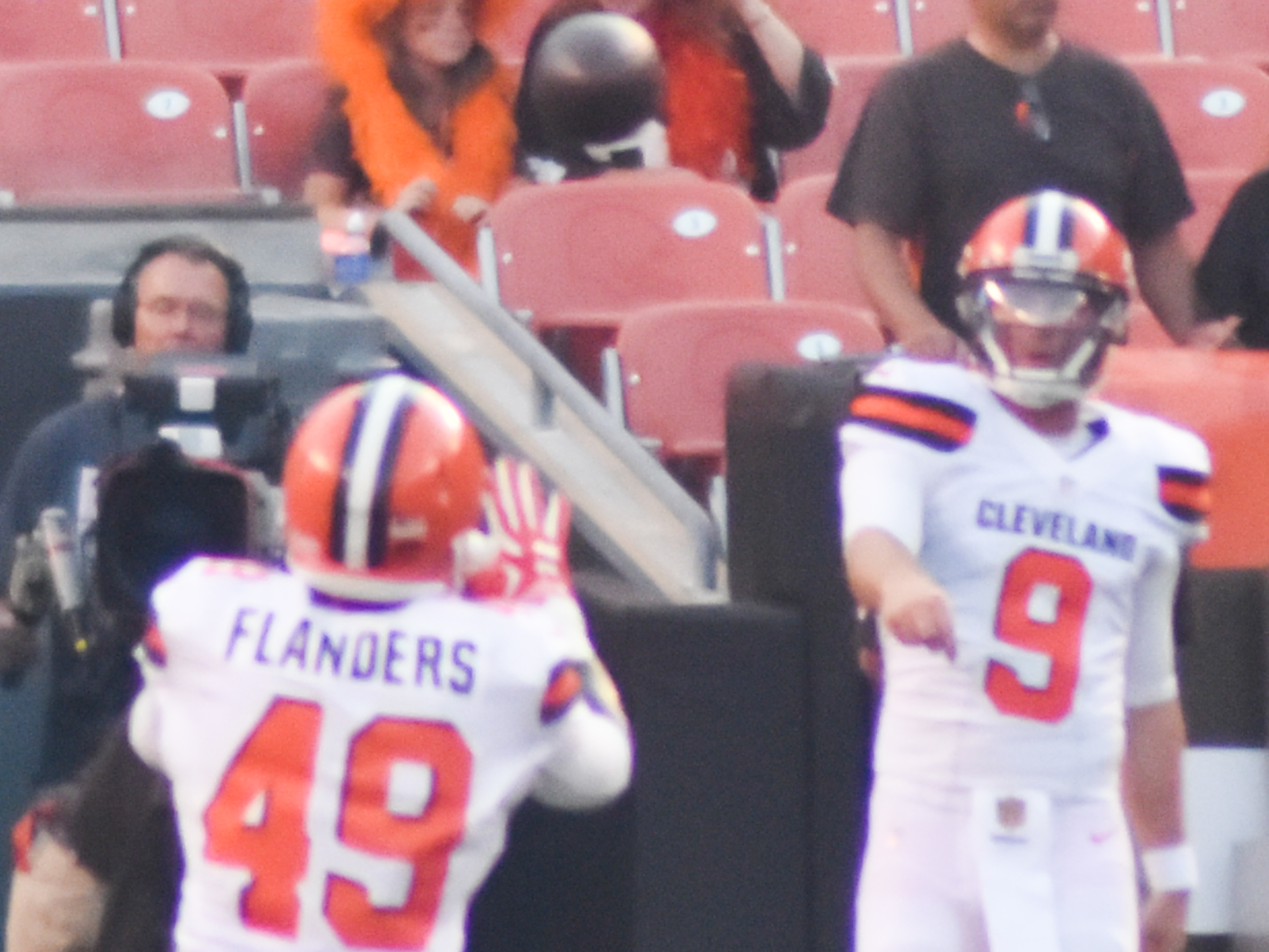
Flanders catching a pass from Connor Shaw in 2015

On August 3, 2015, Flanders signed with the Cleveland Browns, but he was released on September 5, 2015.

=== BC Lions ===
On October 6, 2015, Flanders signed with BC Lions to a practice roster agreement. He was promoted to the active roster for the last game of the regular season and played in his first professional game on November 7, 2015 against the Calgary Stampeders where he had three carries for 15 yards. He was not re-signed following the season and was released on November 10, 2015.

=== Winnipeg Blue Bombers ===
Flanders signed with the Winnipeg Blue Bombers on May 26, 2016 where he had a more prominent role as a back-up running back. He played in seven games for the team, starting in four, where he had 46 rushing attempts for 281 and three touchdowns. He also had 16 receptions for 148 yards. He played with the Blue Bombers for two more seasons, but only dressed for one game in 2018 while spending the rest of the season on the practice roster. He was released by the Blue Bombers on November 19, 2018.

=== Calgary Stampeders (second stint) ===
Flanders remained unsigned at the start of the 2019 CFL season and eventually signed a practice roster agreement with the Stampeders on September 30, 2019. However, he was released on October 26, 2019.

=== Ottawa Redblacks ===
Flanders signed with the Ottawa Redblacks on December 23, 2019, but did not play in 2020 due to the cancellation of the 2020 CFL season. He then re-signed with the Redblacks on January 18, 2021. He became a free agent after the 2021 season.

== Coaching career ==
Since 2022, Flanders has been a running backs and recruiting assistant for the Lake Travis High School football team. He also serves as an assistant basketball coach at Lake Travis High School.
