= Dustin Long (writer) =

American writer

- Education: University of California, Berkeley; Indiana University
- Occupations: Novelist, teacher
- Writing career
- Notable work: Icelander

Dustin Long is an American novelist and author. He is known for his 2006 book Icelander.

== Biography ==
Long studied English literature at the University of California, Berkeley, and is currently a PhD student at Indiana University, Bloomington. Long has a son, and is a teacher in Manhattan. He currently lives in Brooklyn.

== Career ==
Icelander, published in 2006, was Long's first novel. It appeared on the Los Angeles Times best-sellers list. Long published a second novel, Bad Teeth, in 2014.

Long cites Thomas Pynchon and David Foster Wallace as influences.

== Works ==
Fiction

- Icelander (2006, McSweeney's, Hardcover) (2007, Grove Press, Paperback)
- Bad Teeth (2014, New Harvest)
