= Keith Heinrich =

American football player (born 1979)

No. 80, 49, 87
- Position: Tight end

Personal information
- Born: March 19, 1979 (age 47); Houston, Texas, U.S.
- Listed height: 6 ft 6 in (1.98 m)
- Listed weight: 255 lb (116 kg)

Career information
- High school: Tomball (Tomball, Texas)
- College: Sam Houston State
- NFL draft: 2002: 6th round, 174th overall pick

Career history
- Carolina Panthers (2002); Cleveland Browns (2003–2005); Miami Dolphins (2006)*; Tampa Bay Buccaneers (2006–2007); Baltimore Ravens (2008)*; Florida Tuskers (2009–2010)
- * Offseason or practice squad member only

Awards and highlights
- First-team I-AA All-American (2001)

Career NFL statistics
- Receptions: 9
- Receiving yards: 65
- Receiving touchdowns: 2
- Stats at Pro Football Reference

Keith Charles Heinrich (born March 19, 1979) is an American former professional football player who was a tight end in the National Football League (NFL). He was selected by the Carolina Panthers in the sixth round of the 2002 NFL draft. He was a two-sport star at Sam Houston State, playing football and basketball. Heinrich was also a member of the Cleveland Browns, Miami Dolphins, Tampa Bay Buccaneers, Baltimore Ravens and Florida Tuskers.

== College career ==
While at Sam Houston State, Heinrich was a two-sport star in basketball and football.

Member of the 2000 Southland conference Championship Basketball Team. Member of the 2001 Southland Conference Football Team -2000 First-team All-Conference Football 2001 First-team All-Conference Football 2001 First-team All-American Tight End -Was inducted into the Sam Houston State Hall of Honor.

== Professional career ==
Heinrich was selected by the Florida Tuskers on the UFL Premiere Season Draft in 2009 and signed with the team on August 17.
