= Stan Blinka =

American football player (born 1957)

No. 54
- Position: Linebacker

Personal information
- Born: April 29, 1957 (age 69); Columbus, Ohio, U.S.
- Listed height: 6 ft 2 in (1.88 m)
- Listed weight: 230 lb (104 kg)

Career information
- College: Sam Houston State
- NFL draft: 1979: 5th round, 125th overall pick

Career history
- New York Jets (1979–1983); Denver Gold (1985)

Awards and highlights
- PFWA All-Rookie Team (1979)

Career NFL statistics
- Interceptions: 3
- Fumble recoveries: 3
- Stats at Pro Football Reference

Stanley John Blinka (born April 29, 1957) is an American former professional football player who was a linebacker in the National Football League (NFL). He was selected by the New York Jets in the fifth round of the 1979 NFL draft. He was the starting middle linebacker for the NY Jets from 1979 through the 1983 season. He was their leading tackler in 1979 and 1980. He was named to the NFL All Rookie Team in 1979. He played college football at Sam Houston State. He also played one season in the United States Football League (USFL), with the Denver Gold, in 1985.

He was honored as a Distinguished Alumni at Sam Houston State University in 2015. While at Sam Houston State he was named 3 times to the NAIA All-American team, to the Lone Star Conference 1st team 3 times, the Lone Star Conference Team of the 1970s decade and the Lone Star Conference 75th Anniversary Team. He holds his college records for most tackles in a game (24), season (211), and career (536). He was a dual sport athlete as he also lettered in Track and Field. He was a NAIA All American, former SHSU school discus record holder and Lone Star Conference All Academic Team.

He met and married Kathy Steele Blinka in 1978 while at Sam Houston State. They have two children, Kyle Louis Blinka and Clinton Steele Blinka. They have 5 grandchildren, Gage, Aubrie, Gunner, Colton and Kannon. He retired from football in 1985 and began a career as a tax accountant in Houston, Texas. In 1987, he purchased an Interstate Battery distributorship in Pittsburgh, Pennsylvania and has been the owner/operator for 38 years.
