= Garry Kimble (American football) =

American football player (born 1963)

No. 34
- Position: Cornerback

Personal information
- Born: April 5, 1963 (age 63); Lake Charles, Louisiana, U.S.
- Listed height: 5 ft 11 in (1.80 m)
- Listed weight: 184 lb (83 kg)

Career information
- High school: Madison (Houston, Texas)
- College: Sam Houston State
- NFL draft: 1985: 11th round, 304th overall pick

Career history
- Washington Redskins (1987)

Career NFL statistics
- Games played: 3
- Stats at Pro Football Reference

Garry Lynn Kimble (born April 5, 1963) is an American former professional football player who was a cornerback in the National Football League (NFL) for the Washington Redskins. He played college football for the Sam Houston State Bearkats and was selected in the 11th round of the 1985 NFL draft with the 304th overall pick.
