= Matt Dominguez =

American gridiron football player (born 1978)

No. 88
- Position: Wide receiver

Personal information
- Born: June 27, 1978 (age 48); Georgetown, Texas, U.S.
- Listed height: 6 ft 3 in (1.91 m)
- Listed weight: 222 lb (101 kg)

Career information
- College: Sam Houston State
- NFL draft: 2001: undrafted

Career history
- 2001–2002: Denver Broncos
- 2003: Saskatchewan Roughriders
- 2004: New York Jets*
- 2004–2008: Saskatchewan Roughriders
- * Offseason or practice squad member only

Awards and highlights
- Grey Cup champion (2007); CFL West All-Star (2006)
- Stats at Pro Football Reference
- Stats at CFL.ca (archive)

Matt Pilar Dominguez (born June 27, 1978) is an American former professional football wide receiver. He was originally signed by the Denver Broncos as an undrafted free agent in 2001. He played college football at Sam Houston State.

Dominguez was also a member of the New York Jets and Saskatchewan Roughriders. He won a Grey Cup with the Roughriders in the 2007 Saskatchewan Roughriders season.

Dominguez along with then teammate Gene Makowsky made a cameo appearance in the Corner Gas episode "Reader Pride".

Coaching Offensive Co-Ordinator Riffel High School 2007–2010 Offensive Co-ordinator Central High School 2010–2013 Offensive Assistant/Wide Receivers Coach Saskatchewan Selects 2020

== College career ==
Dominguez attended Sam Houston State for college where he was the team's MVP twice and the school's first NCAA division I-AA All-American.

== Professional career ==
=== Denver Broncos ===
Dominguez spent time on the Denver Broncos practice squad and played in 12 games with 3 receptions for 27 yards, his first catch came against the Seattle Seahawks on October 14, 2001.

=== First stint with Roughriders ===
After being released Dominguez was signed by the Roughriders in 2003 and quickly used his size to his advantage and became a fan favourite by gaining over 1,000 yards in his first year.

=== New York Jets ===
In 2004 Dominguez signed with the New York Jets of the National Football League. He was cut at the end of training camp.

=== Second stint with Roughriders ===
In 2005, Dominguez tore ligaments in his knee and was lost for the season after two games. Dominguez runs a football camp in Saskatchewan and spends his off-season in Regina with his wife Jennifer and his sons Matthew the 2nd and Marcel and daughter Victoria. He won the 95th Grey Cup in the 2007 CFL season with the Saskatchewan Roughriders.

Dominguez was released by the Roughriders on February 13, 2009, days before he was due a bonus payment and other incentives with two years remaining on his contract.
