= Dustin Long (American football) =

American football player (born 1981)

No. 17
- Position: Quarterback

Personal information
- Born: November 30, 1981 (age 44); Beaumont, Texas, U.S.
- Listed height: 6 ft 3 in (1.91 m)
- Listed weight: 210 lb (95 kg)

Career information
- College: Texas A&M; Sam Houston State

Career history
- 2005: Dallas Cowboys
- 2006: Hamburg Sea Devils (NFLE)

Dustin Dakota Long (born November 30, 1981) is an American former football quarterback for Texas A&M University He set school records at A&M for single game passing yards (299 versus Kansas in 2002), single game passing touchdowns (19, tied with Gary Kubiak, 1982) and season 300-yard passing games and threw seven touchdown passes to set a Big 12 record at the Texas Tech game. He played 1 season for Sam Houston State University where he was awarded Player of the Year, All American and Finalist for the Walter Payton Award. He was inducted to the Hall of Honor for Sam Houston State University 2024. He played briefly for the NFL's Dallas Cowboys. Long is the son of Kim and Mike Long of Groves, Texas. His father, Mike, played quarterback at Lamar University. He now lives in East Texas with his wife Cynthia (Yarotsky) Long who also played volleyball for Sam Houston State University and their 2 kids, Dakota (daughter) and Jace (son).

== High school career ==
As a senior, Long led Port Neches–Groves High School to the 1999 4A Division II State Championship game while throwing for 3,130 yards and 28 touchdowns. He was named Houston Chronicle Offensive Player of the Year and received the Willie Ray Smith Award, given to the South-east Texas Offensive MVP. Long played in the Oil Bowl and the THSCA North-South All-Star Game. He passed for 6,173 yards and 56 touchdowns in his high school career.

== College career ==
=== 2000 season ===
Long was redshirted.

=== 2001 season ===
Long did not see any action during the regular season. He entered the Galleryfurniture.com Bowl in the fourth quarter, but did not attempt a pass.

=== 2002 season ===
Long had a record-breaking season as a sophomore after not attempting a pass as a freshman. He won the starting spot from two-year incumbent starter Mark Farris with a solid performance against the Pitt Pathers in the second game of the season and started his first career game the following week against Virginia Tech. Long passed for 2,509 yards and 19 touchdowns on 177-of-333 passing, his 2,509 season passing yards putting him at No. 2 in school history for a single season. He started the last nine games of the season and played in all 12. He posted 300-yard passing games against Kansas (399), Texas Tech (367) and Oklahoma State (332). Long shared Big 12 Conference Offensive Player of the Week honors with Texas Tech’s Kliff Kingsbury after passing for 367 yards and seven touchdowns against the Red Raiders, his seven touchdowns shattering a Big 12 record. His 19 passing touchdowns tied him with Gary Kubiak for the most in one season at A&M.

=== 2003 season ===
Long was supplanted by Reggie McNeal as the starting quarterback, although he did see action in all 12 games. In his lone start against Mizzou (after an injury to McNeal), Long passed for 252 yards and a touchdown on 23-of-29 passing. He finished the season with 709 passing yards and four touchdowns on 63-of-104 attempts.

=== 2004 season ===
Unhappy with his lack of playing time, Long decided to transfer to Sam Houston State University following the 2003 season. During his senior season, Long passed for 3,408 yards and 31 touchdowns and led the SHSU to an 11-3 record and helped propel them into the NCAA Division I-AA playoff semifinals. He was named the Southland Conference Offensive Player of the Year and led the Bearkats to a share of the Southland title and an NCAA playoff berth.

In the first round of the playoffs, Long led his team to victory against Western Kentucky. He threw for 323 yards and four touchdowns, leading Sam Houston State to a 54-24 win.

In the second round, Long passed for 478 yards and three touchdowns to rally the Bearkats from a 20-point fourth quarter deficit, leading them on a 75-yard drive which culminated with a seven-yard touchdown pass to Jason Mathenia as time expired for a 35-34 win over Eastern Washington University.

In the semifinals against Montana, Long was 35-of-53 for 375 yards, but was erratic throwing two interceptions without a touchdown. He was sacked six times, matching his total for the entire season up to that point. Ironically, Montana quarterback Craig Ochs was a transfer from Texas A&M's Big 12 rival Colorado Buffaloes.

=== Professional career ===
Although Long went undrafted in the 2005 NFL draft, he participated in workouts and a team mini-camp with the Dallas Cowboys, who allocated him to the Hamburg Sea Devils of NFL Europa, where he did not see any regular-season action. He helps his father, Mike Long, with coaching football at Monsignor Kelly Catholic High School in Beaumont, Texas.
