= P. J. Hall =

American football player (born 1995)

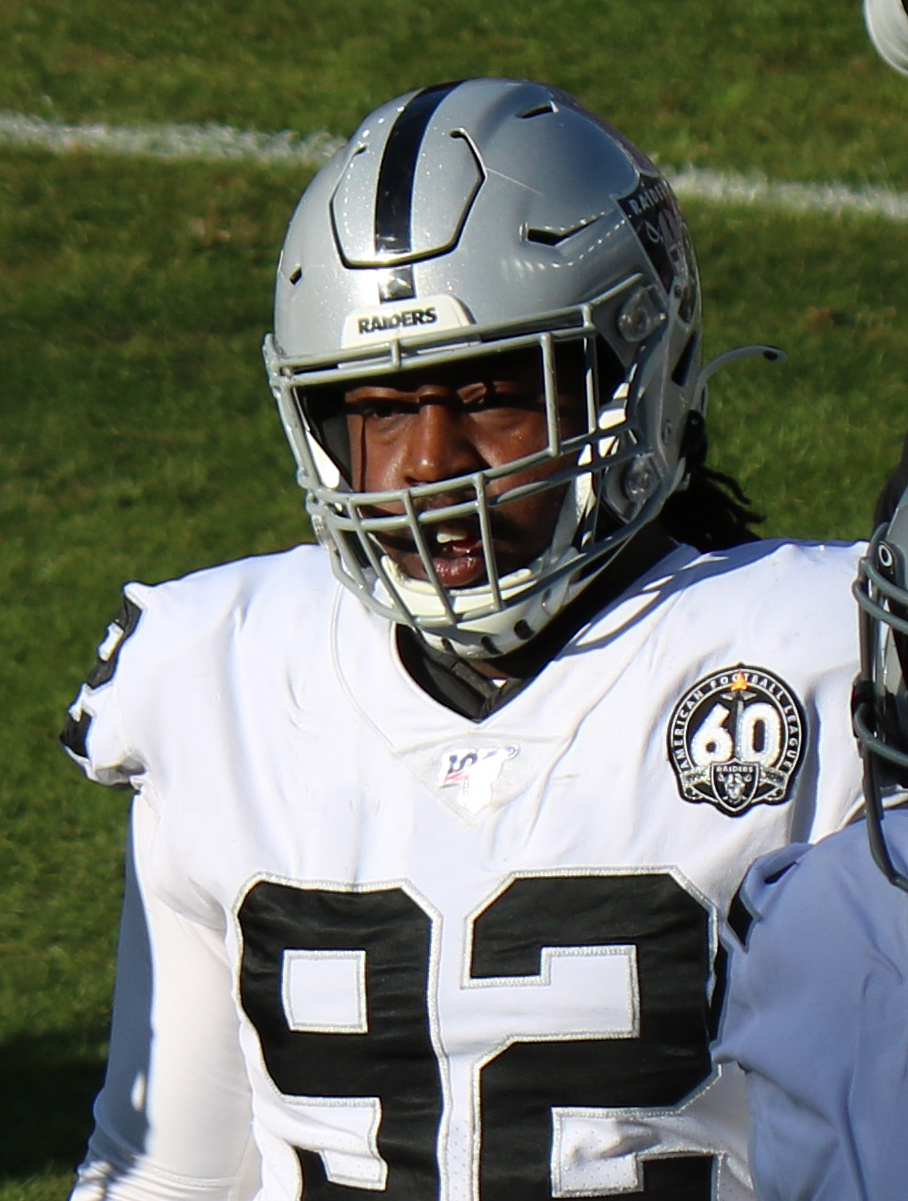
- Hall with the Oakland Raiders in 2019

Profile
- Position: Defensive end

Personal information
- Born: April 5, 1995 (age 31); Seguin, Texas, U.S.
- Listed height: 6 ft 0 in (1.83 m)
- Listed weight: 305 lb (138 kg)

Career information
- High school: Seguin
- College: Sam Houston State
- NFL draft: 2018: 2nd round, 57th overall pick

Career history
- Oakland Raiders (2018–2019); Houston Texans (2020); Seattle Sea Dragons (2023); San Antonio Brahmas (2023); Memphis Showboats (2024–2025)

Awards and highlights
- Southland Defensive Player of the Year (2016); 4× First-team All-Southland (2014–2017)

Career NFL statistics
- Total tackles: 82
- Sacks: 2.5
- Pass deflections: 2
- Stats at Pro Football Reference

Patrick "P. J." Hall Jr. (born April 5, 1995) is an American professional football defensive end. He played college football at Sam Houston State and was selected by the Oakland Raiders of the National Football League (NFL) in the second round of the 2018 NFL draft. He has also played for the Houston Texans of the NFL, and the San Antonio Brahmas and Seattle Sea Dragons of the XFL.

== College career ==
Hall was named to the first-team All-Southland during all four years at Sam Houston. After his junior season Hall was named as the Southland Conference's defensive player of the year, and a finalist for the 2016 Buck Buchanan Award, given to the most outstanding defensive player in the Football Championship Subdivision (FCS). Hall was named to the FCS All-American team during his junior and senior year. Hall is a member of the Theta Mu chapter of Alpha Phi Alpha fraternity.

== Professional career ==
Pre-draft measurables
Height	Weight	40-yard dash	10-yard split	20-yard split	20-yard shuttle	Three-cone drill	Vertical jump	Broad jump	Bench press
6 ft 0 1/2 in (1.84 m)	308 lb (140 kg)	4.73 s	1.70 s	2.78 s	4.77 s	7.92 s	38 in (0.97 m)	9 ft 8 in (2.95 m)	36 reps
All values from NFL Combine

=== Oakland Raiders ===
Hall was drafted by the Oakland Raiders in the second round (57th overall) in the 2018 NFL draft. He was traded to the Minnesota Vikings on August 3, 2020, but reverted to the Raiders' roster after he failed his physical and was subsequently waived.

=== Houston Texans ===
Hall signed with the Houston Texans on August 13, 2020. He was placed on injured reserve on November 25.

The Texans placed a second-round restricted free agent tender on Hall on March 17, 2021, but they withdrew the tender on April 7, and he became a free agent. On October 22, Hall was suspended one game for his June 2021 arrest.

=== Seattle Sea Dragons ===
On November 17, 2022, Hall was drafted by the Seattle Sea Dragons of the XFL. He was placed on the reserve list by the team on March 9, 2023. Hall was released by the Sea Dragons on March 30.

=== San Antonio Brahmas ===
Hall signed with the San Antonio Brahmas of the XFL on April 17, 2023. He was released by the Brahmas on July 10.

=== Memphis Showboats ===
On October 23, 2023, Hall signed with the Memphis Showboats of the United States Football League (USFL).

On May 6, 2025, Hall was released by the Showboats.

== Legal issues ==
In June 2021, Hall was arrested on charges of assault and interfering with public duties.
