= 2016 Southeastern Louisiana Lions football team =

American college football season

2016 Southeastern Louisiana Lions football
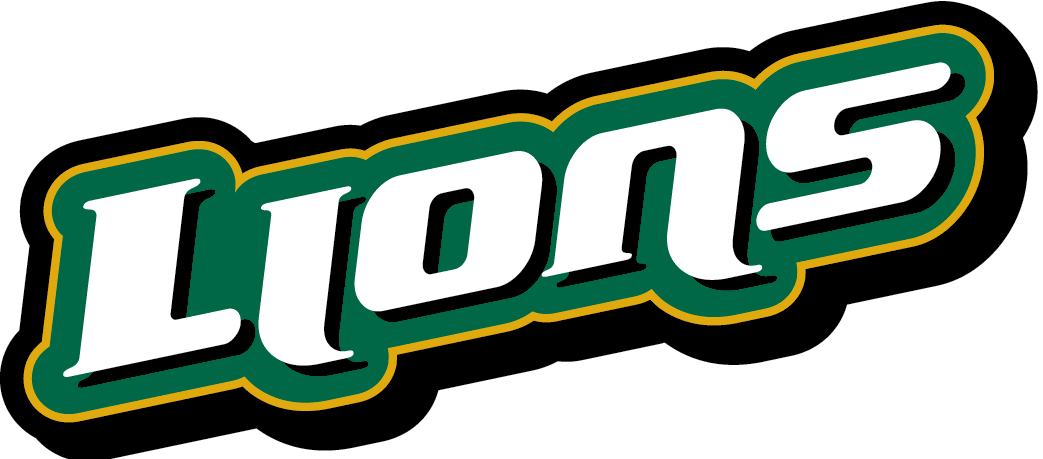
- Conference: Southland Conference
- Record: 7–4 (7–2 Southland)
- Head coach: Ron Roberts (5th season)
- Offensive coordinator: Matt Barrett (1st season)
- Home stadium: Strawberry Stadium

2016 Southland Conference football standings
	Conf.			Overall
Team	W		L	W		L
No. 5 Sam Houston State $^	9	–	0	12	–	1
No. 14 Central Arkansas ^	8	–	1	10	–	3
SE Louisiana	7	–	2	7	–	4
McNeese State	5	–	4	6	–	5
Nicholls State	5	–	4	5	–	6
Stephen F. Austin	4	–	5	5	–	6
Houston Baptist	3	–	5	4	–	7
Incarnate Word *	3	–	6	3	–	8
Lamar	3	–	6	3	–	8
Abilene Christian *	2	–	7	2	–	9
Northwestern State	0	–	9	1	–	10
$ – Conference champion; ^ – FCS playoff participant; * – ineligible for FCS playoffs due to transition from NCAA Division II; Rankings from STATS poll

The 2016 Southeastern Louisiana Lions football team represented Southeastern Louisiana University in the 2016 NCAA Division I FCS football season. The Lions were led by fifth-year head coach Ron Roberts and played their home games at Strawberry Stadium. They were a member of the Southland Conference. They finished the season 7–4, 7–2 in Southland play to finish in third place.

== Schedule ==
Date	Time	Opponent	Site	TV	Result	Attendance
September 3	2:30 pm	at No. 21 (FBS) Oklahoma State*	Boone Pickens Stadium; Stillwater, OK	FSN	L 7–61	50,079
September 10	7:00 pm	at Southern Utah*	Eccles Coliseum; Cedar City, UT	WBS	L 23–28	7,010
September 24	6:00 pm	Northwestern State	Strawberry Stadium; Hammond, LA	CST	W 34–24	6,406
October 1	7:00 pm	at Lamar	Provost Umphrey Stadium; Beaumont, TX	ESPN3	L 14–38	7,032
October 8	6:00 pm	No. 20 McNeese State	Strawberry Stadium; Hammond, LA	CST	W 31–24	6,165
October 15	3:00 pm	at Stephen F. Austin	Homer Bryce Stadium; Nacogdoches, TX	ESPN3	W 58–34	8,314
October 22	4:00 pm	Houston Baptist^{†}	Strawberry Stadium; Hammond, LA	Southeastern Channel	W 37–3	6,603
October 29	2:30 pm	No. 19 Central Arkansas	Strawberry Stadium; Hammond, LA	ESPN3	L 10–45	4,241
November 5	2:30 pm	at Incarnate Word	Gayle and Tom Benson Stadium; San Antonio, TX	UIWtv	W 30–10	5,746
November 12	7:00 pm	Abilene Christian	Strawberry Stadium; Hammond, LA	Southeastern Channel	W 31–19	4,331
November 17	6:00 pm	at Nicholls State	Manning Field at John L. Guidry Stadium; Thibodaux, LA (River Bell Classic)	ASN	W 44–42	7,002
*Non-conference game; ^{†}Homecoming; Rankings from STATS Poll released prior to the game; All times are in Central time

== Game summaries ==
=== @ Oklahoma State ===
Southeastern Louisiana @ Oklahoma State

Team	1	2	3	4	Total
Lions	0	7	0	0	7
• #21 (FBS) Cowboys	28	3	21	9	61

- Date: September 3
- Location: Boone Pickens Stadium
  Stillwater, OK
- Game start: 2:30 PM CDT
- Elapsed time: 3:28
- Game attendance: 50,079
- Game weather: 84 °F (29 °C) • Wind SSE 9 mph (14 km/h) • Partly cloudy
- Referee: Scott Campbell
- TV announcers (FSN): Brendan Burke, Brian Baldinger, Christian Steckel

Scoring summary
1	13:15	Oklahoma State	Madre Harper 0 yard fumble return (Ben Grogan kick), Drive: 5 plays, 23 yards, 1:45	0–7
1	10:50	Oklahoma State	Chris Carson 10 yard run (Ben Grogan kick), Drive: 4 plays, 36 yards, 1:36	0–14
1	8:10	Oklahoma State	Jhajuan Seales 24 yard pass from Mason Rudolph (Ben Grogan kick), Drive: 3 plays, 34 yards, 0:41	0–21
1	4:24	Oklahoma State	Barry J. Sanders 1 yard run (Ben Grogan kick), Drive: 5 plays, 65 yards, 1:10	0–28
2	12:42	Oklahoma State	Ben Grogan 32 yard field goal, Drive: 10 plays, 46 yards, 2:47	0–31
2	5:41	Southeastern Louisiana	Kaelyn Henderson 26 yard run (Jonathon Tatum kick), Drive: 5 plays, 51 yards, 2:30	7–31
3	14:38	Oklahoma State	Ramon Richards 9 yard fumble return (Ben Grogan kick), Drive: 2 plays, 0 yards, 0:09	7–38
3	3:40	Oklahoma State	Jhajuan Seales 16 yard pass from Mason Rudolph (Ben Grogan kick), Drive: 9 plays, 50 yards, 3:34	7–45
3	2:13	Oklahoma State	Jeff Carr 1 yard run (Ben Grogan kick), Drive: 3 plays, 19 yards, 0:46	7–52
4	14:50	Oklahoma State	Ben Grogan 28 yard field goal, Drive: 4 plays, 5 yards, 1:01	7–55
4	3:00	Oklahoma State	Taylor Cornelius 5 yard run (Matt Ammendola kick failed), Drive: 15 plays, 90 yards, 8:58	7–61

=== @ Southern Utah ===
Southeastern Louisiana at Southern Utah

Team	1	2	3	4	Total
Lions	10	7	0	6	23
• Thunderbirds	7	7	7	7	28

- Date: September 10
- Location: Eccles Coliseum
  Cedar City, UT
- Game start: 6:00 MDT
- Elapsed time: 3:10
- Game attendance: 7,010
- Game weather: 75 °F (24 °C) • Sunny
- TV announcers (WBS): Art Challis, Devin Dixon

Scoring summary
1	12:51	Southeastern Louisiana	Brandon Acker 19 yard pass from Justin Alo (Jonathan Tatum kick), Drive: 5 plays, 75 yards, 2:09	7–0
1	9:45	Southern Utah	Brady Measom 6 yard pass from Patrick Tyler (Keita Calhoun kick), Drive: 10 plays, 60 yards, 3:06	7–7
1	0:45	Southeastern Louisiana	Jonathan Tatum 24 yard field goal, Drive: 8 plays, 40 yards, 2:21	10–7
2	12:14	Southeastern Louisiana	Rasheed Harrell 5 yard run (Jonathan Tatum kick), Drive: 4 plays, 69 yards, 1:47	17–7
2	8:33	Southern Utah	Ty Rutledge 3 yard run (Keita Calhoun kick), Drive: 11 plays, 87 yards, 3:41	17–14
3	7:57	Southern Utah	Brady Measom 10 yard pass from Patrick Tyler (Keita Calhoun kick), Drive: 7 plays, 53 yards, 2:15	17–21
4	9:27	Southern Utah	Mike Sharp 16 yard pass from Patrick Tyler (Keita Calhoun kick), Drive: 9 plays, 69 yards, 2:39	17–28
4	3:33	Southeastern Louisiana	Juwan Dickey 20 Yd pass from Justin Alo (two-point pass conv. failed), Drive: 12 plays, 75 yards, 5:54	23–28

=== Northwestern State ===
Northwestern State at Southeastern Louisiana

Team	1	2	3	4	Total
Demons	6	0	15	3	24
• Lions	14	7	7	6	34

- Date: September 24
- Location: Strawberry Stadium
  Hammond, LA
- Game start: 6:07 pm CDT
- Elapsed time: 3:04
- Game attendance: 6,406
- Referee: Eddy Shelton
- TV announcers (CST): Lyn Rollins, Rene Nadeau, Carley McCord

Scoring summary
1	12:00	Northwestern State	Ronald Green 14 yard run (Eric Piccione kick blocked), Drive: 8 plays, 75 yards, 3:00	0–6
1	8:40	Southeastern Louisiana	Juwan Dickey 11 yard pass from Justin Alo (Jonathon Tatum kick), Drive: 7 plays, 67 yards, 3:12	7–6
1	3:44	Southeastern Louisiana	Julius Maracalin 1 yard run (Jonathon Tatum kick), Drive: 6 plays, 84 yards, 2:37	14–6
2	0:12	Southeastern Louisiana	Brandon Acker 13 yard pass from Justin Alo (Jonathon Tatum kick), Drive: 6 plays, 89 yards, 1:40	21–6
3	8:10	Northwestern State	Bobby Chan-Chan 34 yard pass from Brooks Haack (Eric Piccione kick), Drive: 5 plays, 51 yards, 2:08	21–13
3	2:32	Northwestern State	Tuff McClain 20 yard pass from Brooks Haack (Brooks Haack pass to Lucas Morgan for two-point conv.), Drive: 9 plays, 53 yards, 4:27	21–21
3	0:12	Southeastern Louisiana	Brandon Acker 27 yard pass from Justin Alo (Jonathon Tatum kick), Drive: 5 plays, 69 yards, 2:14	28–21
4	13:28	Northwestern State	Eric Piccione 45 yard field goal, Drive: 7 plays, 29 yards, 1:36	28–24
4	8:54	Southeastern Louisiana	Jonathon Tatum 30 yard field goal, Drive: 10 plays, 73 yards, 4:29	31–24
4	2:13	Southeastern Louisiana	Jonathon Tatum 40 yard field goal, Drive: 4 plays, 6 yards, 1:20	34–24

=== @ Lamar ===
Southeastern Louisiana at Lamar

Team	1	2	3	4	Total
Lions	0	7	0	7	14
• Cardinals	14	3	14	7	38

- Date: October 1
- Location: Provost Umphrey Stadium
  Beaumont, TX
- Game start: 7:00 PM CDT
- Elapsed time: 3:13
- Game attendance: 7,032
- Game weather: 75 °F (24 °C) • Wind 2 mph (3.2 km/h) • Cloudy
- Referee: Kevin Boatmann
- TV announcers (ESPN3): David Saltzman, Lemont Williams

Scoring summary
1	3:33	Lamar	Kendrick King 6 yard run (Alex Ball kick), Drive: 7 plays, 80 yards, 2:48	0–7
1	2:13	Lamar	Carson Earp 17 yard run (Alex Ball kick), Drive: 2 plays, 17 yards, 0:10	0–14
2	1:05	Southeastern Louisiana	Rasheed Harrell 10 yard run (Jonathan Tatum kick), Drive: 7 plays, 74 yards, 1:26	7–14
2	0:00	Lamar	Alex Ball 38 yard field goal, Drive: 8 plays, 45 yards, 1:05	7–17
3	9:06	Lamar	Carson Earp 13 yard run (Alex Ball kick), Drive: 8 plays, 83 yards, 3:01	7–24
3	2:15	Lamar	Kad Harrington 15 yard run (Alex Ball kick), Drive: 5 plays, 43 yards, 2:32	7–31
4	11:06	Lamar	Andrew Allen 6 yard run (Alex Ball kick), Drive: 5 plays, 31 yards, 2:32	7–38
4	2:37	Southeastern Louisiana	Joe Pack 12 yard pass from Justin Alo (Jonathan Tatum kick), Drive: 7 plays, 57 yards, 2:13	14–38

=== McNeese State ===
McNeese State at Southeastern Louisiana

Team	1	2	3	4	Total
#20 Cowboys	0	14	3	7	24
• Lions	7	0	17	7	31

- Date: October 8
- Location: Strawberry Stadium
  Hammond, LA
- Game start: 6:00 PM CDT
- Elapsed time: 3:21
- Game attendance: 6,165
- Game weather: 83 °F (28 °C) • Wind N 12 mph (19 km/h) • Sunny
- Referee: Kevin Hassell
- TV announcers (ESPN3): Sean Kelley, Deuce McAllister, Carley McCord

Scoring summary
1	10:33	Southeastern Louisiana	Max Lyons 0 yard fumble recovery (Jonathon Tatum kick), Drive: 4 plays, -20 yards, 1:26	7–0
2	14:55	McNeese State	Nick Edwards 11 yard pass from James Tabary (Gunnar Raborn kick), Drive: 9 plays, 34 yards, 5:11	7–7
2	6:41	McNeese State	Dylan Long 4 yard pass from James Tabary (Gunnar Raborn kick), Drive: 7 plays, 71 yards, 3:40	7–14
3	13:55	Southeastern Louisiana	Juwaan Rogers 36 yard pass from Justin Alo (Jonathon Tatum kick), Drive: 3 plays, 75 yards, 1:05	14–14
3	10:51	Southeastern Louisiana	Bransen Schwebel 17 yard pass from Justin Alo (Jonathon Tatum kick), Drive: 3 plays, 25 yards, 1:35	21–14
3	9:22	McNeese State	Gunnar Raborn 30 yard field goal, Drive: 5 plays, 57 yards, 1:21	21–17
3	5:34	Southeastern Louisiana	Jonathon Tatum 41 yard field goal, Drive: 10 plays, 52 yards, 3:42	24–17
4	7:42	McNeese State	Lawayne Ross 19 yard run (Gunnar Raborn kick), Drive: 9 plays, 80 yards, 4:03	24–24
4	0:08	Southeastern Louisiana	Brandon Acker 82 yard pass from Justin Alo (Jonathon Tatum kick), Drive: 2 plays, 85 yards, 0:39	31–24

=== @ Stephen F. Austin ===
Stephen F. Austin at Southeastern Louisiana

Team	1	2	3	4	Total
• Lions	10	20	7	21	58
Lumberjacks	3	14	17	0	34

- Date: October 15
- Location: Homer Bryce Stadium
  Nacogdoches, TX
- Game start: 6:30 PM CDT
- Elapsed time: 3:58
- Game attendance: 8,314
- Game weather: About 85 °F (29 °C) • Partly cloudy
- Referee: Michael VanderVelde
- TV announcers (ESPN3): Rob Meyers, Tyler DePascal

Scoring summary
1	11:21	Southeastern Louisiana	Jonathan Tatum 33 yard field goal, Drive: 9 plays, 61 yards, 3:47	3–0
1	8:48	Stephen F. Austin	Storm Ruiz 37 yard field goal, Drive: 8 plays, 31 yards, 1:52	3–3
1	6:22	Southeastern Louisiana	Brandon Acker 19 yard pass from Justin Alo (Jonathan Tatum kick), Drive: 5 plays, 53 yards, 2:17	10–3
2	13:46	Southeastern Louisiana	Juwan Dickey 10 yard pass from Justin Alo (Jonathan Tatum kick), Drive: 4 plays, 80 yards, 1:05	17–3
2	12:31	Stephen F. Austin	Loren Easly 61 yard run (Storm Ruiz kick), Drive: 4 plays, 76 yards, 1:06	17–10
2	7:21	Southeastern Louisiana	Juwan Dickey 27 yard pass from Justin Alo (Jonathan Tatum kick blocked), Drive: 7 plays, 63 yards, 2:39	23–10
2	1:55	Southeastern Louisiana	Julius Maracalin 2 yard run (Jonathan Tatum kick), Drive: 8 plays, 58 yards, 3:30	30–10
2	0:52	Stephen F. Austin	George Stone 50 yard interception return (Storm Ruiz kick)	30–17
3	12:20	Stephen F. Austin	Loren Easly 2 yard run (Storm Ruiz kick), Drive: 11 plays, 83 yards, 2:45	30–24
3	9:18	Southeastern Louisiana	Kaelyn Henderson 45 yard run (Jonathan Tatum kick), Drive: 1 plays, 45 yards, 0:04	37–24
3	5:10	Stephen F. Austin	Storm Ruiz 29 yard field goal, Drive: 6 plays, 17 yards, 2:02	37–27
3	3:28	Stephen F. Austin	Loren Easly 74 yard run (Storm Ruiz kick), Drive: 2 plays, 90 yards, 0:38	34–37
4	7:17	Southeastern Louisiana	Courtney Rutledge 72 yard blocked field goal return (Jonathan Tatum kick)	44–34
4	6:06	Southeastern Louisiana	Jacory Fuller 41 yard interception return (Jonathan Tatum kick)	51–34
4	0:39	Southeastern Louisiana	Jacq'co Price 35 yard pass from D'Shaie Landor (Jonathan Tatum kick), Drive: 4 plays, 38 yards, 1:21	58–34

=== Houston Baptist ===
Houston Baptist at Southeastern Louisiana

Team	1	2	3	4	Total
Huskies	3	0	0	0	3
• Lions	7	9	14	7	37

- Date: October 22
- Location: Strawberry Stadium
  Hammond, LA
- Game start: 4:00 PM CDT
- Elapsed time: 3:00
- Game attendance: 6,603
- Referee: Eddy Shelton
- TV announcers (Southeastern Channel): John Sartori, Wesley Boone, Richie Solares

Scoring summary
1	10:15	Southeastern Louisiana	Rasheed Harrell 51 yard run (Jonathan Tatum kick), Drive: 4 plays, 80 yards, 1:49	7–0
1	0:00	Houston Baptist	Alec Chadwick 43 yard field goal, Drive: 10 plays, 42 yards, 4:28	7–3
2	13:53	Southeastern Louisiana	Julius Maracalin 8 yard run (Jonathan Tatum kick failed), Drive: 5 plays, 65 yards, 1:07	13–3
2	0:00	Southeastern Louisiana	Jonathan Tatum 22 yard field goal, Drive: 11 plays, 90 yards, 1:18	16–3
3	9:34	Southeastern Louisiana	Brandon Acker 11 yard pass from D'Shaie Landor (Jonathan Tatum kick), Drive: 10 plays, 61 yards, 5:19	23–3
3	2:44	Southeastern Louisiana	Jake Ingraffia 22 yard pass from D'Shaie Landor (Jonathan Tatum kick), Drive: 12 plays, 90 yards, 5:04	30–3
4	6:04	Southeastern Louisiana	Darius Durall 16 yard run (Jonathan Tatum kick), Drive: 2 plays, 17 yards, 0:44	37–3

=== Central Arkansas ===
Central Arkansas at Southeastern Louisiana

Team	1	2	3	4	Total
• #19 Bears	0	24	14	7	45
Lions	0	3	7	0	10

- Date: October 29
- Location: Strawberry Stadium
  Hammond, LA
- Game start: 7:00 PM CDT
- Elapsed time: 3:08
- Game attendance: 4,241
- Game weather: 86 °F (30 °C) • Wind ENE 3 mph (4.8 km/h) • Clear
- Referee: Ross Smith
- TV announcers (ESPN3): Lyn Rollins, Rene Nadeau, Tatum Everett

Scoring summary
2	13:16	Central Arkansas	Hayden Hildebrand 4 yard run (Matt Cummins kick), Drive: 12 plays, 69 yards, 3:57	0–7
2	9:54	Central Arkansas	Matt Cummins 47 yard field goal, Drive: 5 plays, 21 yards, 2:27	0–10
2	8:56	Central Arkansas	Tyler Williams 32 yard interception return (Matt Cummins kick), Drive: 3 plays, 0 yards, 0:58	0–17
2	5:13	Southeastern Louisiana	Jonathon Tatum 31 yard field goal, Drive: 11 plays, 61 yards, 3:43	3–17
2	0:11	Central Arkansas	Cody Dauksch 7 yard pass from Hayden Hildebrand (Matt Cummins kick), Drive: 7 plays, 38 yards, 1:03	3–24
3	8:14	Central Arkansas	Scott Matiaha 6 yard pass from Hayden Hildebrand (Matt Cummins kick), Drive: 14 plays, 69 yards, 6:36	3–31
3	4:51	Central Arkansas	Desmond Smith 7 yard pass from Hayden Hildebrand (Matt Cummins kick), Drive: 7 plays, 47 yards, 1:42	3–38
3	1:09	Southeastern Louisiana	Jacorey Fuller 25 yard return of blocked punt (Jonathon Tatum kick), Drive: 3 plays, 8 yards, 1:31	10–38
4	11:15	Central Arkansas	Jakari Dillard 0 yard fumble recovery (Matt Cummins kick), Drive: 5 plays, 54 yards, 2:49	10–45

=== @ Incarnate Word ===
Southeastern Louisiana at Incarnate Word

Team	1	2	3	4	Total
• Lions	0	7	10	13	30
Cardinals	3	0	0	7	10

- Date: November 5
- Location: Gayle and Tom Benson Stadium
  San Antonio, TX
- Game start: 2:30 PM CST
- Elapsed time: 2:56
- Game attendance: 5,746
- Game weather: 80 °F (27 °C) • Wind NE 8 mph (13 km/h) • Partly cloudy
- Referee: Vidal Jones
- TV announcers (UIWtv): Chris Reyes, Michael Aleman
Sources: Box Score

Scoring summary
1	3:56	Incarnate Word	Cody Seidel 32 yard field goal, Drive: 11 plays, 76 yards, 4:33	0–3
2	13:44	Southeastern Louisiana	Julius Maracalin 10 yard run (Jonathon Tatum kick), Drive: 3 plays, 68 yards, 1:02	7–3
3	9:08	Southeastern Louisiana	Jonathon Tatum 24 yard field goal, Drive: 12 plays, 52 yards, 4:29	10–3
3	3:20	Southeastern Louisiana	Juwan Dickey 14 yard pass from D'Shaie Landor (Jonathon Tatum kick), Drive: 7 plays, 63 yards, 2:55	17–3
4	14:19	Southeastern Louisiana	Juwan Dickey 16 yard pass from D'Shaie Landor (Jonathon Tatum kick blocked), Drive: 4 plays, 70 yards, 1:23	23–3
4	11:50	Incarnate Word	Kody Edwards 10 yard pass from Trent Brittain (Cody Seidel kick), Drive: 9 plays, 90 yards, 2:19	23–10
4	4:25	Southeastern Louisiana	Juwaan Rogers 8 yard pass from D'Shaie Landor (Jonathon Tatum kick), Drive: 6 plays, 49 yards, 2:50	30–10

=== Abilene Christian ===
Abilene Christian at Southeastern Louisiana

Team	1	2	3	4	Total
Wildcats	3	10	6	0	19
• Lions	14	7	10	0	31

- Date: November 12
- Location: Strawberry Stadium
  Hammond, LA
- Game start: 7:00 PM CDT
- Elapsed time: 3:24
- Game attendance: 4,331
- Game weather: 58 °F (14 °C) • Wind N 5 mph (8.0 km/h) • Clear, fair
- Referee: Michael VanderVelde
- TV announcers (Southeastern Channel): John Sartori, Richie Solares

Scoring summary
1	7:32	Southeastern Louisiana	Juwaan Rogers 30 yard pass from Justin Alo (Jonathon Tatum kick), Drive: 10 plays, 88 yards, 4:45	7–0
1	4:11	Abilene Christian	Nik Grau 30 yard field goal, Drive: 10 plays, 60 yards, 3:15	7–3
1	2:20	Southeastern Louisiana	Brandon Acker 13 yard pass from Justin Alo (Jonathon Tatum kick), Drive: 5 plays, 74 yards, 1:46	14–3
2	11:48	Abilene Christian	Dallas Sealey 3 yard pass from De'Andre Brown (Nik Grau kick), Drive: 3 plays, 12 yards, 1:01	14–10
2	7:25	Abilene Christian	Nik Grau 43 yard field goal, Drive: 7 plays, 31 yards, 3:16	14–13
2	0:38	Southeastern Louisiana	Julius Maracalin 2 yard run (Jonathon Tatum kick), Drive: 4 plays, 42 yards, 1:19	21–13
3	10:28	Southeastern Louisiana	Jake Jiannoni 4 yard fumble return (Jonathon Tatum kick), Drive: 2 plays, -6 yards, 0:11	28–13
3	9:50	Abilene Christian	Josh Fink 48 yard pass from Dallas Sealey (two-point pass conv. failed), Drive: 2 plays, 65 yards, 0:38	28–19
3	0:44	Southeastern Louisiana	Jonathon Tatum 23 yard field goal, Drive: 10 plays, 83 yards, 3:36	31–19

=== @ Nicholls State ===
Southeastern Louisiana at Nicholls

Team	1	2	3	4	Total
• Lions	14	0	13	17	44
Colonels	0	21	0	21	42

- Date: November 17
- Location: John L. Guidry Stadium
  Thibodaux, LA
- Game start: 6:00 PM CST
- Elapsed time: 7,002
- Game attendance: 3:54
- Game weather: 69 °F (21 °C) • Wind SE 5 mph (8.0 km/h) • Clear
- Referee: Michael VanderVelde
- TV announcers (ASN): Lyn Rollins, Rene Nadeau, Carley McCord

Scoring summary
1	2:28	Southeastern Louisiana	Julius Maracalin 2 yard run (Jonathon Tatum kick), Drive: 9 plays, 65 yards, 3:28	7–0
1	1:58	Southeastern Louisiana	Justin Alo 9 yard run (Jonathon Tatum kick), Drive: 1 play, 9 yards, 0:06	14–0
2	11:45	Nicholls	C.J. Bates 24 yard pass from Chase Fourcade (David McKey kick), Drive: 12 plays, 65 yards, 5:13	14–7
2	10:03	Nicholls	Chase Fourcade 1 yard run (David McKey kick), Drive: 2 plays, 68 yards, 0:30	14–14
2	5:24	Nicholls	Dontrell Taylor 33 yard run (David McKey kick), Drive: 2 plays, 34 yards, 0:37	14–21
3	8:59	Southeastern Louisiana	Javon Conner 9 yard pass from D'Shaie Landor (Jonathon Tatum kick failed), Drive: 3 plays, 10 yards, 0:31	20–21
3	3:01	Southeastern Louisiana	Julius Maracalin 21 yard run (Jonathon Tatum kick), Drive: 8 plays, 90 yards, 3:22	27–21
4	13:17	Southeastern Louisiana	Julius Maracalin 10 yard run (Jonathon Tatum kick), Drive: 6 plays, 75 yards, 3:13	34–21
4	12:20	Nicholls	C.J. Bates 57 yard pass from Chase Fourcade (David McKey kick), Drive: 3 plays, 78 yards, 0:51	34–28
4	9:51	Southeastern Louisiana	Juwan Dickey 48 yard pass from D'Shaie Landor (Jonathon Tatum kick), Drive: 6 plays, 79 yards, 2:21	41–28
4	5:04	Southeastern Louisiana	Dillon Burkhard 22 yard field goal, Drive: 8 plays, 34 yards, 4:16	44–28
4	1:18	Nicholls	Damion Jeanpiere 5 yard pass from Chase Fourcade (Chase Fourcade pass to C.J. Bates for two-point conv.), Drive: 13 plays, 80 yards, 2:19	44–36
4	0:04	Nicholls	Chase Fourcade 2 yard run (two-point pass conv. failed), Drive: 6 plays, 57 yards, 1:07	44–42
