= 2016 Northwestern State Demons football team =

American college football season

2016 Northwestern State Demons football
- Conference: Southland Conference
- Record: 1–10 (0–9 Southland)
- Head coach: Jay Thomas (4th season)
- Offensive coordinator: Ben Norton (3rd season)
- Defensive coordinator: Daryl Daye (2nd season)
- Home stadium: Harry Turpin Stadium

2016 Southland Conference football standings
	Conf.			Overall
Team	W		L	W		L
No. 5 Sam Houston State $^	9	–	0	12	–	1
No. 14 Central Arkansas ^	8	–	1	10	–	3
SE Louisiana	7	–	2	7	–	4
McNeese State	5	–	4	6	–	5
Nicholls State	5	–	4	5	–	6
Stephen F. Austin	4	–	5	5	–	6
Houston Baptist	3	–	5	4	–	7
Incarnate Word *	3	–	6	3	–	8
Lamar	3	–	6	3	–	8
Abilene Christian *	2	–	7	2	–	9
Northwestern State	0	–	9	1	–	10
$ – Conference champion; ^ – FCS playoff participant; * – ineligible for FCS playoffs due to transition from NCAA Division II; Rankings from STATS poll

The 2016 Northwestern State Demons football team represented Northwestern State University as a member of the Southland Conference during the 2016 NCAA Division I FCS football season. Led by fourth-year head coach Jay Thomas, the Demons compiled an overall record of 1–10 with a mark of 0–9 in conference play, placing last out of 11 teams in the Southland. Northwestern State played home games at Harry Turpin Stadium in Natchitoches, Louisiana.

== Schedule ==
Date	Time	Opponent	Site	TV	Result	Attendance
September 2	6:30 pm	at No. 23 (FBS) Baylor	McLane Stadium; Waco, TX	FSN	L 7–55	44,849
September 8	6:00 pm	Incarnate Word	Harry Turpin Stadium; Natchitoches, LA	ASN	L 18–21	9,120
September 17	6:00 pm	at Central Arkansas	Estes Stadium; Conway, AR	BNN	L 10–24	8,047
September 24	6:00 pm	at Southeastern Louisiana	Strawberry Stadium; Hammond, LA	CST	L 24–34	6,406
October 8	6:00 pm	Kentucky Wesleyan*	Harry Turpin Stadium; Natchitoches, LA	DemonTV	W 49–7	8,189
October 15	6:00 pm	at Lamar	Provost Umphrey Stadium; Beaumont, TX	ESPN3	L 31–32	7,159
October 22	6:00 pm	McNeese State^{†}	Harry Turpin Stadium; Natchitoches, LA (rivalry)	DTV	L 27–48	10,159
October 29	6:00 pm	Nicholls State	Harry Turpin Stadium; Natchitoches, LA (NSU Challenge)	WHNO	L 14–31	5,825
November 5	6:00 pm	at Abilene Christian	Shotwell Stadium; Abilene, TX	ACUSports	L 22–25	3,957
November 12	6:00 pm	No. 1 Sam Houston State	Harry Turpin Stadium; Natchitoches, LA	ESPN3	L 16–48	6,421
November 19	3:00 pm	at Stephen F. Austin	Homer Bryce Stadium; Nacogdoches, TX (Chief Caddo)	ESPN3	L 31–45	7,539
*Non-conference game; ^{†}Homecoming; Rankings from STATS Poll released prior to the game; All times are in Central time

== Game summaries ==
=== @ Baylor ===
Northwestern State at Baylor

Team	1	2	3	4	Total
Demons	0	0	7	0	7
• #23 (FBS) Bears	24	24	7	0	55

- Date: September 3
- Location: McLane Stadium
  Waco, TX
- Game start: 6:30 PM CDT
- Elapsed time: 3:21
- Game attendance: 44,849
- Game weather: 86 °F (30 °C) • Wind N 8 mph (13 km/h) • Sunny
- Referee: Brad Van Vark
- Television network: FSN

Scoring summary
1	10:46	Baylor	Terence Williams 13 yard run (Chris Callahan kick), Drive: 6 plays, 59 yards, 1:59	0–7
1	6:52	Baylor	Chris Callahan 23 yard field goal, Drive: 6 plays, 25 yards, 2:37	0–10
1	4:26	Baylor	Sam Tecklenburg 4 yard pass from Seth Russell (Chris Callahan kick), Drive: 7 plays, 46 yards, 1:24	0–17
1	1:02	Baylor	K.D. Cannon 6 yard pass from Seth Russell (Chris Callahan kick), Drive: 8 plays, 55 yards, 2:20	0–24
2	10:19	Baylor	Chris Callahan 33 yard field goal, Drive: 7 plays, 55 yards, 2:35	0–27
2	8:03	Baylor	Jordan Feuerbacher 5 yard pass from Seth Russell (Chris Callahan kick), Drive: 3 plays, 5 yards, 0:31	0–34
2	5:00	Baylor	Pooh Stricklin 10 yard pass from Seth Russell (Chris Callahan kick), Drive: 4 plays, 70 yards, 0:50	0–41
2	1:07	Baylor	Terence Williams 1 yard run (Chris Callahan kick), Drive: 7 plays, 53 yards, 1:41	0–48
3	11:13	Baylor	Blake Lynch 12 yard pass from Zach Smith (Chris Callahan kick), Drive: 9 plays, 62 yards, 3:47	0–55
3	0:51	Northwestern State	Brooks Haack 3 yard run (Eric Piccione kick), Drive: 8 plays, 45 yards, 4:12	7–55

=== Incarnate Word ===
Incarnate Word at Northwestern State

Team	1	2	3	4	Total
• Cardinals	7	7	7	0	21
Demons	3	3	5	7	18

- Date: September 8
- Location: Harry Turpin Stadium
  Natchitoches, LA
- Game start: 6:00 PM CDT
- Elapsed time: 3:22
- Game attendance: 9,120
- Game weather: 96 °F (36 °C) • Wind N 6 mph (9.7 km/h) • Hot and humid
- Referee: Dan Lewis
- Television network: ASN
Sources: Box Score

Scoring summary
1	10:23	Northwestern State	Eric Piccione 38 yard field goal, Drive: 6 plays, 36 yards, 2:27	3–0
1	4:03	Incarnate Word	Junior Sessions 2 yard run (Cody Seidel kick), Drive: 14 plays, 75 yards, 6:20	3–7
2	4:07	Incarnate Word	Kody Edwards 10 yard pass from Trent Brittain (Cody Seidel kick), Drive: 10 plays, 62 yards, 4:08	3–14
2	2:09	Northwestern State	Eric Piccione 47 yard field goal, Drive: 6 plays, 45 yards, 1:58	6–14
3	10:41	Northwestern State	Team Safety, Drive: 3 plays, 1 yard, 1:37	8–14
3	5:08	Northwestern State	Eric Piccione 34 yard field goal, Drive: 11 plays, 48 yards, 5:26	11–14
3	4:03	Incarnate Word	Broderick Reeves 11 yard run (Cody Seidel kick), Drive: 4 plays, 69 yards, 0:58	11–21
4	11:25	Northwestern State	Chris Jones 3 yard run (Eric Piccione kick), Drive: 8 plays, 80 yards, 3:30	18–21

=== @ Central Arkansas ===
Northwestern State at Central Arkansas

Team	1	2	3	4	Total
Demons	0	7	0	3	10
• Bears	0	14	10	0	24

- Date: September 17
- Location: Estes Stadium
  Conway, AR
- Game start: 6:00 PM CDT
- Elapsed time: 3:00
- Game attendance: 8,047
- Referee: S. Baron
- Television network: BNN

Scoring summary
2	14:11	Central Arkansas	Jatavious Wilson 49 yard pass from Hayden Hildebrand (Matt Cummins kick), Drive: 9 plays, 83 yards, 2:36	0–7
2	5:52	Central Arkansas	Desmond Smith 5 yard pass from Hayden Hildebrand (Matt Cummins kick), Drive: 14 plays, 64 yards, 5:45	0–14
2	4:46	Northwestern State	Shakeir Ryan 25 yard pass from Joel Blumenthal (Eric Piccione kick), Drive: 3 plays, 75 yards, 1:06	7–14
3	9:55	Central Arkansas	Hayden Hildebrand 12 yard run (Matt Cummins kick), Drive: 6 plays, 35 yards, 3:02	7–21
3	3:55	Central Arkansas	Matt Cummins 33 yard field goal, Drive: 9 plays, 38 yards, 3:38	7–24
4	14:55	Northwestern State	Eric Piccione 44 yard field goal, Drive: 8 plays, 36 yards, 3:32	10–24

=== @ Southeastern Louisiana ===
Northwestern State at Southeastern Louisiana

Team	1	2	3	4	Total
Demons	6	0	15	3	24
• Lions	14	7	7	6	34

- Date: September 24
- Location: Strawberry Stadium
  Hammond, LA
- Game start: 6:07 pm CDT
- Elapsed time: 3:04
- Game attendance: 6,406
- Referee: Eddy Shelton
- Television network: CST

Scoring summary
1	12:00	Northwestern State	Ronald Green 14 yard run (Eric Piccione kick blocked), Drive: 8 plays, 75 yards, 3:00	6–0
1	8:40	Southeastern Louisiana	Juwan Dickey 11 yard pass from Justin Alo (Jonathon Tatum kick), Drive: 7 plays, 67 yards, 3:12	6–7
1	3:44	Southeastern Louisiana	Julius Maracalin 1 yard run (Jonathon Tatum kick), Drive: 6 plays, 84 yards, 2:37	6–14
2	0:12	Southeastern Louisiana	Brandon Acker 13 yard pass from Justin Alo (Jonathon Tatum kick), Drive: 6 plays, 89 yards, 1:40	6–21
3	8:10	Northwestern State	Bobby Chan-Chan 34 yard pass from Brooks Haack (Eric Piccione kick), Drive: 5 plays, 51 yards, 2:08	13–21
3	2:32	Northwestern State	Tuff McClain 20 yard pass from Brooks Haack (Brooks Haack pass to Lucas Morgan for two-point conv.), Drive: 9 plays, 53 yards, 4:27	21–21
3	0:12	Southeastern Louisiana	Brandon Acker 27 yard pass from Justin Alo (Jonathon Tatum kick), Drive: 5 plays, 69 yards, 2:14	21–28
4	13:28	Northwestern State	Eric Piccione 45 yard field goal, Drive: 7 plays, 29 yards, 1:36	24–28
4	8:54	Southeastern Louisiana	Jonathon Tatum 30 yard field goal, Drive: 10 plays, 73 yards, 4:29	24–31
4	2:13	Southeastern Louisiana	Jonathon Tatum 40 yard field goal, Drive: 4 plays, 6 yards, 1:20	24–34

=== Kentucky Wesleyan ===
Kentucky Wesleyan at Northwestern State

Team	1	2	3	4	Total
Panthers	0	7	0	0	7
• Demons	14	7	14	14	49

- Date: October 8
- Location: Harry Turpin Stadium
  Natchitoches, LA
- Game start: 6:00 PM CDT
- Elapsed time: 3:03
- Game attendance: 8,189
- Game weather: 73 °F (23 °C) • Wind NE 7 mph (11 km/h) • Clear skies
- Referee: Vidal Jones
- Television network: DTV

Scoring summary
1	11:01	Northwestern State	Ronald Green 2 yard run (Eric Piccione kick), Drive: 5 plays, 32 yards, 2:20	7–0
1	5:04	Northwestern State	William Mafi 31 yard pass from Brooks Haack (Eric Piccione kick), Drive: 7 plays, 69 yards, 3:17	14–0
2	13:06	Northwestern State	Cameron Lazare 6 yard pass from Brooks Haack (Eric Piccione kick), Drive: 8 plays, 53 yards, 3:32	21–0
2	6:08	Kentucky Wesleyan	Josiah Isreal 2 yard run (Cole Woodburn kick), Drive: 13 plays, 75 yards, 6:53	21–7
3	3:04	Northwestern State	William Mafi 12 yard pass from Brooks Haack (Eric Piccione kick), Drive: 15 plays, 93 yards, 7:20	28–7
3	0:36	Northwestern State	De'Mard Llorens 8 yard run (Eric Piccione kick), Drive: 2 plays, 13 yards, 0:15	35–7
4	7:57	Northwestern State	De'Mard Llorens 13 yard run (Benny Broadway kick), Drive: 3 plays, 40 yards, 1:02	42–7
4	4:06	Northwestern State	Ronald Green 9 yard run (Benny Broadway kick), Drive: 5 plays, 45 yards, 2:41	49–7

=== @ Lamar ===
Northwestern State at Lamar

Team	1	2	3	4	Total
Demons	3	14	7	7	31
• Cardinals	0	9	6	17	32

- Date: October 15
- Location: Provost Umphrey Stadium
  Beaumont, TX
- Game start: 6:00 PM CDT
- Elapsed time: 3:30
- Game attendance: 7,159
- Game weather: 81 °F (27 °C) • Wind SSE 8 mph (13 km/h) • Partly cloudy
- Referee: Ross Smith
- Television network: ESPN3

Scoring summary
1	6:58	Northwestern State	Eric Piccione 45 yard field goal, Drive: 8 plays, 37 yards, 2:32	3–0
2	14:57	Northwestern State	De'Mar Llorens 1 yard run (Eric Piccione kick), Drive: 10 plays, 54 yards, 4:23	10–0
2	8:44	Lamar	Juan Carranco 22 yard field goal, Drive: 15 plays, 72 yards, 6:08	10–3
2	3:03	Northwestern State	Charles Vaughn 1 yard run (Eric Piccione kick), Drive: 4 plays, 34 yards, 1:26	17–3
2	0:12	Lamar	Michael Handy 10 yard pass from Carson Earp (Juan Carranco kick blocked), Drive: 14 plays, 75 yards, 2:50	17–9
3	13:59	Northwestern State	De'Mar Llorens 8 yard run (Eric Piccione kick), Drive: 3 plays, 77 yards, 0:57	24–9
3	13:13	Lamar	Dewan Thompson 86 yard pass from Carson Earp (Dewan Thompson two-point run conv. failed) Drive: 2 plays, 83 yards, 0:41	24–15
4	9:06	Lamar	Juan Carranco 30 yard field goal, Drive: 15 plays, 68 yards, 5:09	24–18
4	6:44	Northwestern State	Jared West 2 yard run (Eric Piccione kick), Drive: 5 plays, 74 yards, 2:12	31–18
4	1:43	Lamar	Marcus Daggs 36 yard pass from Carson Earp (Juan Carranco kick), Drive: 5 plays, 74 yards, 1:07	31–25
4	0:06	Lamar	DeWan Thompson 22 yard pass from Carson Earp (Juan Carranco kick), Drive: 9 plays, 58 yards, 1:30	31–32

=== McNeese State ===
McNeese State at Northwestern State

Team	1	2	3	4	Total
• Cowboys	14	7	17	10	48
Demons	7	7	10	3	27

- Date: October 22
- Location: Harry Turpin Stadium
  Natchitoches, LA
- Game start: 6:00 PM CDT
- Elapsed time: 3:24
- Game attendance: 10,159
- Game weather: 71 °F (22 °C) • Wind ESE 3 mph (4.8 km/h) • Clear and crisp
- Referee: Kevin Muir
- Television network: DTV

Scoring summary
1	9:45	McNeese State	Ryan Ross 4 yard run (Gunnar Raborn kick), Drive: 9 plays, 75 yards, 5:10	0–7
1	8:13	Northwestern State	Bobb Chan-Chan 7 yard pass from Brooks Haack (Eric Piccione kick), Drive: 5 plays, 67 yards, 1:25	7–7
1	0:10	McNeese State	Dylan Long 3 yard pass from James Tabary (Gunnar Raborn kick), Drive: 9 plays, 74 yards, 4:12	7–14
2	6:48	McNeese State	Kent Shelby 22 yard pass from James Tabary (Gunnar Raborn kick), Drive: 8 plays, 78 yards, 4:15	7–21
2	2:44	Northwestern State	Ronald Green 28 yard run (Eric Piccione kick), Drive: 8 plays, 84 yards, 3:59	14–21
3	12:43	Northwestern State	Shakeir Ryan 26 yard run (Eric Piccione kick), Drive: 5 plays, 72 yards, 2:10	21–21
3	9:02	McNeese State	Gunnar Raborn 27 yard field goal, Drive: 8 plays, 65 yards, 3:36	21–24
3	6:56	McNeese State	Justin Pratt 47 yard run (Gunnar Raborn kick), Drive: 2 plays, 56 yards, 0:58	21–31
3	4:04	McNeese State	Kylon Highshaw 6 yard pass from James Tabary (Gunnar Raborn kick), Drive: 4 plays, 71 yards, 1:22	21–38
3	1:07	Northwestern State	Eric Piccione 30 yard field goal, Drive: 8 plays, 58 yards, 2:51	24–38
4	12:56	McNeese State	Gunnar Raborn 25 yard field goal, Drive: 9 plays, 77 yards, 3:05	24–41
4	7:29	Northwestern State	Eric Piccione 30 yard field goal, Drive: 6 plays, 47 yards, 1:46	27–41
4	1:25	McNeese State	Jermai Antoine 70 yard interception return (Gunnar Raborn kick), Drive: 5 plays, 31 yards, 1:30	27–48

=== Nicholls ===
Nicholls at Northwestern State

Team	1	2	3	4	Total
• Colonels	0	14	14	3	31
Demons	7	7	0	0	14

- Date: October 29
- Location: Harry Turpin Stadium
  Natchitoches, LA
- Game start: 6:00 PM CDT
- Elapsed time: 3:03
- Game attendance: 5,825
- Game weather: 82 °F (28 °C) • Wind SSE 4 mph (6.4 km/h) • Sunny and warm
- Referee: Kevin Boitmann
- Television network: WHNO

Scoring summary
1	8:29	Northwestern State	De'Mard Llorens 34 yard run (Eric Piccione kick), Drive: 7 plays, 75 yards, 2:20	7–0
2	14:16	Nicholls	C.J. Bates 24 yard pass from Chase Fourcade (David McKey kick), Drive: 6 plays, 53 yards, 2:33	7–7
2	4:00	Nicholls	Chase Fourcade 1 yard run (David McKey kick), Drive: 20 plays, 80 yards, 7:52	7–14
2	2:16	Northwestern State	Bobby Chan-Chan 56 yard pass from Brooks Haack (Eric Piccione kick), Drive: 4 plays, 76 yards, 1:43	14–14
3	10:50	Nicholls	C.J. Bates 2 yard pass from Chase Fourcade (David McKey kick), Drive: 11 plays, 60 yards, 4:04	14–21
3	7:27	Nicholls	C.J. Bates 74 yard pass from Chase Fourcade (David McKey kick), Drive: 5 plays, 87 yards, 2:03	14–28
4	12:16	Nicholls	David McKey 31 yard field goal, Drive: 13 plays, 68 yards, 5:02	14–31

=== @ Abilene Christian ===
Northwestern State at Abilene Christian

Team	1	2	3	4	Total
Demons	13	0	6	3	22
• Wildcats	2	3	9	11	25

- Date: November 5
- Location: Shotwell Stadium
  Abilene, TX
- Game start: 6:00 PM CDT
- Elapsed time: 3:07
- Game attendance: 3,957
- Game weather: 68 °F (20 °C) • Wind ESE 11 mph (18 km/h) • Cloudy
- Referee: Ross Smith
- Television network: ACUSports

Scoring summary
1	11:02	Northwestern State	Ronald Green 41 yard run (Eric Piccione kick blocked), Drive: 6 plays, 65 yards, 1:48	6–0
1	11:02	Abilene Christian	Keith Barnett defensive kick conv., Drive: 6 plays, 65 yards, 1:48	6–2
1	6:12	Northwestern State	De'Mard Llorens 36 yard pass from J.D. Almond (Eric Piccione kick), Drive: 5 plays, 60 yards, 2:21	13–2
2	6:55	Abilene Christian	Nik Grau 42 yard field goal, Drive: 10 plays, 46 yards, 3:59	13–5
3	9:15	Abilene Christian	Nik Grau 30 yard field goal, Drive: 9 plays, 47 yards, 2:43	13–8
3	4:33	Northwestern State	De'Mard Llorens 1 yard run (two-point pass conv. failed), Drive: 11 plays, 71 yards, 4:34	19–8
3	1:20	Abilene Christian	Tracy James 5 yard pass from Dallas Sealey (two-point pass conv. failed), Drive: 8 plays, 79 yards, 3:06	19–14
4	12:16	Abilene Christian	Nik Grau 41 yard field goal, Drive: 10 plays, 56 yards, 2:36	19–17
4	8:36	Abilene Christian	Dallas Sealey 1 yard run (De'Andre Brown pass to Trevor Crain for two-point conv.), Drive: 7 plays, 81 yards, 1:39	19–25
4	4:31	Northwestern State	Eric Piccione 40 yard field goal, Drive: 9 plays, 43 yards, 4:05	22–25

=== Sam Houston State ===
Sam Houston State at Northwestern State

Team	1	2	3	4	Total
• #1 Bearkats	20	21	0	7	48
Demons	13	0	3	0	16

- Date: November 12
- Location: Harry Turpin Stadium
  Natchitoches, LA
- Game start: 6:00 PM CDT
- Elapsed time: 3:16
- Game attendance: 6,421
- Game weather: 71 °F (22 °C) • Wind SSE 7 mph (11 km/h) • Calm and cool
- Referee: Ross Smith
- Television network: ESPN3

Scoring summary
1	11:09	Sam Houston State	Nathan Stewart 5 yard pass from Jeremiah Briscoe (Luc Swimberghe kick), Drive: 8 plays, 67 yards, 2:30	0–7
1	10:06	Northwestern State	Bobby Chan-Chan 79 yard pass from J.D. Almond (Eric Piccione kick), Drive: 3 plays, 85 yards, 0:56	7–7
1	7:52	Northwestern State	De'Mard Llorens 14 yard run (Eric Piccione kick blocked), Drive: 6 plays, 51 yards, 2:01	13–7
1	4:38	Sam Houston State	Davion Davis 10 yard pass from Jeremiah Briscoe (Luc Swimberghe kick), Drive: 10 plays, 85 yards, 3:08	13–14
1	0:37	Sam Houston State	Yedidiah Louis 4 yard pass from Jeremiah Briscoe (Luc Swimberghe kick failed), Drive: 7 plays, 58 yards, 1:33	13–20
2	12:29	Sam Houston State	Nathan Stewart 33 yard pass from Jeremiah Briscoe (Luc Swimberghe kick), Drive: 4 plays, 44 yards, 0:59	13–27
2	9:53	Sam Houston State	Corey Avery 1 yard run (Luc Swimberghe kick), Drive: 5 plays, 32 yards, 1:17	13–34
2	3:22	Sam Houston State	Ragan Henderson 13 yard run (Luc Swimberghe kick), Drive: 11 plays, 76 yards, 3:33	13–41
3	3:41	Northwestern State	Eric Piccione 39 yard field goal, Drive: 6 plays, 42 yards, 2:03	16–41
4	14:25	Sam Houston State	Tyler Scott 3 yard pass from Jeremiah Briscoe (Luc Swimberghe kick), Drive: 4 plays, 49 yards, 1:06	16–48

=== @ Stephen F. Austin ===
Northwestern State at Stephen F. Austin

Team	1	2	3	4	Total
Demons	7	14	0	10	31
• Lumberjacks	20	10	7	8	45

- Date: November 19
- Location: Homer Bryce Stadium
  Nacogdoches, TX
- Game start: 3:00 PM CST
- Elapsed time: 3:42
- Game attendance: 7,539
- Referee: Marvel July
- Television network: ESPN3

Scoring summary
1	13:28	Stephen F. Austin	Storm Ruiz 24 yard field goal, Drive: 6 plays, 46 yards, 1:20	0–3
1	10:28	Stephen F. Austin	Tamrick Pace 27 yard pass from Zach Conque (Storm Ruiz kick), Drive: 7 plays, 71 yards, 2:01	0–10
1	8:40	Northwestern State	Bobby Chan-Chan 72 yard pass from Brooks Haack (Eric Piccione kick), Drive: 4 plays, 91 yards, 1:43	7–10
1	7:17	Stephen F. Austin	Cody Williams 20 yard pass from Zach Conque (Storm Ruiz kick), Drive: 4 plays, 67 yards, 1:18	7–17
1	0:03	Stephen F. Austin	Storm Ruiz 31 yard field goal, Drive: 11 plays, 62 yards, 4:07	7–20
2	13:03	Northwestern State	Bobby Chan-Chan 22 yard pass from Brooks Haack (Eric Piccione kick), Drive: 5 plays, 65 yards, 2:00	14–20
2	5:08	Stephen F. Austin	Storm Ruiz 24 yard field goal, Drive: 7 plays, 35 yards, 2:19	14–23
2	1:59	Northwestern State	De'Mard Llorens 3 yard pass from Brooks Haack (Eric Piccione kick), Drive: 7 plays, 71 yards, 3:03	21–23
2	0:09	Stephen F. Austin	Kiki Hill 7 yard pass from Zach Conque (Storm Ruiz kick), Drive: 10 plays, 80 yards, 1:43	21–30
3	12:50	Stephen F. Austin	Loren Easly 13 yard run (Storm Ruiz kick), Drive: 5 plays, 77 yards, 2:06	21–37
4	14:51	Northwestern State	Eric Piccione 47 yard field goal, Drive: 9 plays, 24 yards, 3:22	24–37
4	11:50	Northwestern State	De'Mard Llorens 6 yard run (Eric Piccione kick), Drive: 4 plays, 66 yards, 1:36	31–37
4	3:35	Stephen F. Austin	Loren Easly 11 yard run (Cody Williams pass to Zach Conque for two-point conv.), Drive: 16 plays, 90 yards, 8:07	31–45
