= 2016 Lamar Cardinals football team =

American college football season

2016 Lamar Cardinals football
- Conference: Southland Conference
- Record: 3–8 (3–6 Southland)
- Head coach: Ray Woodard (7th season)
- Offensive coordinator: Chuck Langston (2nd season)
- Offensive scheme: Spread
- Defensive coordinator: Trey Haverty (1st season)
- Base defense: 4–3
- Home stadium: Provost Umphrey Stadium

2016 Southland Conference football standings
	Conf.			Overall
Team	W		L	W		L
No. 5 Sam Houston State $^	9	–	0	12	–	1
No. 14 Central Arkansas ^	8	–	1	10	–	3
SE Louisiana	7	–	2	7	–	4
McNeese State	5	–	4	6	–	5
Nicholls State	5	–	4	5	–	6
Stephen F. Austin	4	–	5	5	–	6
Houston Baptist	3	–	5	4	–	7
Incarnate Word *	3	–	6	3	–	8
Lamar	3	–	6	3	–	8
Abilene Christian *	2	–	7	2	–	9
Northwestern State	0	–	9	1	–	10
$ – Conference champion; ^ – FCS playoff participant; * – ineligible for FCS playoffs due to transition from NCAA Division II; Rankings from STATS poll

The 2016 Lamar Cardinals football team represented Lamar University in the 2016 NCAA Division I FCS football season. The Cardinals were led by seventh-year head coach Ray Woodard and played their home games at Provost Umphrey Stadium. They were a member of the Southland Conference. They finished the season 3–8, 3–6 in Southland play to finish in a tie for eighth place.

== TV and radio media ==
All Lamar games were broadcast on KLVI, also known as News Talk 560.

Live video of all home games (except those broadcast via the American Sports Network) was streamed on ESPN3.

== Before the season ==
=== Changes in the coaching staff ===
- Trey Haverty - Trey Haverty was named defensive coordinator on January 26, 2016. He replaces Craig McGallion, who announced his retirement in November, 2015. Haverty has ten years of collegiate coaching experience including positions at TCU and Texas Tech.
- John Blake - Former Oklahoma head coach, John Blake, joined the Cardinals coaching staff in February, 2016. He was responsible for the defensive line. After one month at Lamar and during the Cardinals' spring camp, John Blake accepted the defensive line coach position with the Buffalo Bills following the Bill's firing of Karl Dunbar. Blake had also held positions with the Dallas Cowboys, North Carolina, Nebraska, Mississippi State, and Tulsa.
- Willie Mack Garza - Willie Mack Garza also joined the Cardinals staff in January. He will be working with the secondary. Garza has also had seventeen years of experience at the collegiate level including stops at USC, Tennessee, TCU, Western Michigan, and North Dakota State.
- Eric Roark - Eric Roark was named defensive line coach on April 19, 2016. Roark fills the position vacated by John Blake's move to the Buffalo Bills staff. Roark coached at Division I programs UTSA, SMU, Middle Tennessee State, Tennessee Tech, and Murray State.

=== Spring camp and 6th annual Crawfish Bowl ===
The Cardinals participated in Spring camp from March 7 ending with the 6th annual Crawfish Bowl Spring game on April 16. Camp included workouts three days each week with a break from March 14–18 for Spring Break. The offense defeated the defense 25-23 in the Crawfish Bowl Spring game.

=== Roster changes ===
2015 1st team All-Southland Conference member, Larance Hale, was dismissed from the team on March 29, 2016 for a violation of team rules.

=== Honors and recognition ===
==== Pre-season FCS All-America team ====
- Athlon Sports 2016 FCS All-America team - Kade Harrington was named to the pre-season Athlon Sports 2016 FCS All-America team.
- STATS 2016 FCS All-America team - Kade Harrington was named to the 1st team pre-season STATS 2016 FCS All-America team. Bret Treadway was named to the STATS FCS pre-season 3rd team.
- College Sports Madness 2016 FCS All-America team - Kade Harrington was named to the 1st team pre-season College Sports Madness 2016 FCS All-America team. Bret Treadway was named to the College Sports Madness FCS pre-season 3rd team.

==== Pre-season Southland Conference team ====
Four Cardinals were named to pre-season Southland Conference teams. Kade Harrington, Bret Treadway, and Rodney Randle were named as 1st teamers. Brendan Langley was named to the 2nd team.

== 2016 recruiting ==
The Cardinals signed 28 players including 22 high school recruits and six transfers from other colleges. Three of the transfers were from NCAA Division I (FBS) programs. Four of the recruits were already enrolled for the spring, 2016 semester while 24 signed letters of intent on National Signing Day.

=== Early enrollees ===
Four recruits transferring from other programs enrolled for Spring, 2016 semester courses at Lamar. The four players are Jalen Barnes from Texas Tech, Kanon Mackey from Texas State, Marcus Daggs from Cisco College, and Clayton Turner from Miami (FL). The list includes ratings when originally recruited from high school.

College recruiting (Early)
Name	Hometown	School	Height	Weight	Commit date
Jalen Barnes; DB	Port Arthur, TX	Texas Tech	6 ft 0 in (1.83 m)	190 lb (86 kg)	Enrolled
Jalen Barnes; DB	Recruit ratings: Scout: Rivals: 247Sports: ESPN:				
Kanon Mackey; OL	Silsbee, TX	Texas State	6 ft 4 in (1.93 m)	320 lb (150 kg)	Enrolled
Kanon Mackey; OL	Recruit ratings: Scout: Rivals: 247Sports:				
Marcus Daggs; WR	Ennis, TX	Cisco College	6 ft 1 in (1.85 m)	180 lb (82 kg)	Dec 7, 2015
Marcus Daggs; WR	Recruit ratings: 247Sports:				
Clayton Turner; QB	Marietta, GA	Miami (FL)	6 ft 4 in (1.93 m)	210 lb (95 kg)	Enrolled
Clayton Turner; QB	Recruit ratings: No ratings found				
Overall recruit ranking:
Note: In many cases, Scout, Rivals, 247Sports, On3, and ESPN may conflict in their listings of height and weight.; In these cases, the average was taken. ESPN grades are on a 100-point scale.; Sources:

=== 2016 National Signing Day ===
Lamar signed 24 players on national letter of intent day. Recruits are listed in the "2016 Recruits" table below. Player profiles for each recruit are available at the signing day link below. The 2016 signing day recruits included 22 players from high school and 2 transfers.

College recruiting (2016)
Name	Hometown	School	Height	Weight	Commit date
Caleb Abrom; DB	DeSoto, TX	DeSoto HS	6 ft 0 in (1.83 m)	180 lb (82 kg)	Dec 17, 2015
Caleb Abrom; DB	Recruit ratings: Scout: Rivals: 247Sports:				
Jaylon Bowden; DB	Port Arthur, TX	Blinn College	5 ft 10 in (1.78 m)	190 lb (86 kg)	Jan 7, 2016
Jaylon Bowden; DB	Recruit ratings: 247Sports:				
David Crosley; LB	DeRidder, LA	DeRidder HS	6 ft 1 in (1.85 m)	237 lb (108 kg)	Sep 9, 2015
David Crosley; LB	Recruit ratings: 247Sports:				
Jarett Carpenter; LB	Fairfield, TX	Fairfield HS	6 ft 5 in (1.96 m)	200 lb (91 kg)	Jul 28, 2015
Jarett Carpenter; LB	Recruit ratings: 247Sports:				
Shyler Staton; DB	Missouri City, TX	Ridge Point HS	5 ft 11 in (1.80 m)	160 lb (73 kg)	Jul 28, 2015
Shyler Staton; DB	Recruit ratings: 247Sports:				
Daniel Crosley; DT	DeRidder, LA	DeRidder HS	6 ft 1 in (1.85 m)	235 lb (107 kg)	Sep 9, 2015
Daniel Crosley; DT	Recruit ratings: 247Sports:				
Demontrai Lewis; DE	Lufkin, TX	Kilgore College	6 ft 3 in (1.91 m)	252 lb (114 kg)	Jan 24, 2016
Demontrai Lewis; DE	Recruit ratings: 247Sports:				
Kendrick King; ATH	Hamshire, TX	Hamshire-Fannett HS	5 ft 10 in (1.78 m)	170 lb (77 kg)	Nov 4, 2015
Kendrick King; ATH	Recruit ratings: 247Sports:				
Cameron Minger; LB	Dallas, TX	Woodrow Wilson HS	6 ft 0 in (1.83 m)	198 lb (90 kg)	Jan 16, 2016
Cameron Minger; LB	Recruit ratings: 247Sports:				
Shane Hudson; WR	Crosby, TX	Crosby HS	6 ft 2 in (1.88 m)	170 lb (77 kg)	Sep 23, 2015
Shane Hudson; WR	Recruit ratings: 247Sports:				
Chase Bridgeman; OL	Crosby, TX	Crosby HS	6 ft 4 in (1.93 m)	275 lb (125 kg)	Sep 10, 2015
Chase Bridgeman; OL	Recruit ratings: 247Sports:				
Trevon Simpson; OL	Fairfield, TX	Fairfield HS	6 ft 4 in (1.93 m)	275 lb (125 kg)	Jun 3, 2015
Trevon Simpson; OL	Recruit ratings: No ratings found				
Adam Morse; QB	Port Neches, TX	Port Neches HS	6 ft 1 in (1.85 m)	210 lb (95 kg)	Jul 27, 2015
Adam Morse; QB	Recruit ratings: No ratings found				
Markell Hawthorne; RB	Lake Charles, LA	La Grange HS	5 ft 11 in (1.80 m)	190 lb (86 kg)	Aug 4, 2015
Markell Hawthorne; RB	Recruit ratings: No ratings found				
Mason Sikes; TE	Lumberton, TX	Lumberton HS	6 ft 4 in (1.93 m)	230 lb (100 kg)	Dec 1, 2015
Mason Sikes; TE	Recruit ratings: No ratings found				
James Jeffery; DE	Houston, TX	Cypress Ridge HS	6 ft 3 in (1.91 m)	235 lb (107 kg)	Jan 17, 2016
James Jeffery; DE	Recruit ratings: No ratings found				
Mike Coats; OLB	Edmond, OK	Santa Fe HS	6 ft 2 in (1.88 m)	212 lb (96 kg)	Jan 16, 2016
Mike Coats; OLB	Recruit ratings: No ratings found				
Blake George; DB	Humble, TX	Humble HS	5 ft 11 in (1.80 m)	193 lb (88 kg)	Dec 15, 2015
Blake George; DB	Recruit ratings: No ratings found				
Del'Chaung Rushing; LB	Webster, TX	Clear Springs HS	6 ft 0 in (1.83 m)	195 lb (88 kg)	Jan 16, 2016
Del'Chaung Rushing; LB	Recruit ratings: No ratings found				
Austin Krautz; ATH	Nederland, TX	Nederland HS	5 ft 10 in (1.78 m)	180 lb (82 kg)	Oct 29, 2015
Austin Krautz; ATH	Recruit ratings: No ratings found				
Christian Langston; LS	Port Neches, TX	Port Neches HS	6 ft 2 in (1.88 m)	205 lb (93 kg)	Oct 29, 2015
Christian Langston; LS	Recruit ratings: No ratings found				
Caisen Sullivan; WR	Port Neches, TX	Port Neches HS	6 ft 1 in (1.85 m)	185 lb (84 kg)	Sep 23, 2015
Caisen Sullivan; WR	Recruit ratings: No ratings found				
Tre Towery; DL	Moore, OK	Westmoore HS	6 ft 3 in (1.91 m)	290 lb (130 kg)	Jan 24, 2016
Tre Towery; DL	Recruit ratings: No ratings found				
Mitchell Gray; P	Brisbane, Australia	Westmore HS	5 ft 10 in (1.78 m)	175 lb (79 kg)	
Mitchell Gray; P	Recruit ratings: No ratings found				
Overall recruit ranking: 247Sports: 133
Note: In many cases, Scout, Rivals, 247Sports, On3, and ESPN may conflict in their listings of height and weight.; In these cases, the average was taken. ESPN grades are on a 100-point scale.; Sources: "2016 Team Ranking". Rivals.com.; "Lamar 2016 Football Commits". 247Sports.

=== Post Signing Day Transfers ===
Andrew Allen transferred from New Mexico State. He has two years of eligibility remaining. Allen started 8 games and played in 17 games for the Aggies. He had 1,700 yards passing and 16 touchdowns, and rushed for 352 yards for New Mexico State. Ratings are from the high school recruiting period.

College recruiting (Late)
Name	Hometown	School	Height	Weight	Commit date
Andrew Allen; QB	Texas City, TX	New Mexico State	6 ft 0 in (1.83 m)	200 lb (91 kg)	Enrolled
Andrew Allen; QB	Recruit ratings: Scout: 247Sports: ESPN:				
Overall recruit ranking:
Note: In many cases, Scout, Rivals, 247Sports, On3, and ESPN may conflict in their listings of height and weight.; In these cases, the average was taken. ESPN grades are on a 100-point scale.; Sources:

== Roster ==
2016 Lamar Cardinals football team roster
Players
Coaches
Offense

Pos.	#	Name	Class
QB	2	Brett Cox	Fr
WR	5	Brendan Langley	So
WR	6	Marcus Daggs	Jr
WR	7	Michael Handy	Jr
RB	8	Kade Harrington	Jr
WR	9	Reggie Begelton	Sr
QB	10	Joe Minden	Sr
QB	11	Carson Earp	Jr
QB	12	Blake McKenzie	Jr
WR/DB	12	Tariq Gordon	Fr
TE	17	DC Arceneaux	Fr
RB	22	Emmett Raleigh	Jr
RB	26	Derrion Randle	Fr
RB	27	Keegan Mitchell	Fr
RB	33	Emanuel Atoyebi	Fr
OL	58	Bret Treadway	Jr
OL	59	Richard Alfonso	Jr
OL	60	Kanon Mackey	So
OL	61	Blaine Myers	So
OL	62	Seth Adams	Fr
OL	63	Connor Ward	So
OL	64	Barrett Myers	Fr
OL	66	Chase Woods	So
OL	68	Jessie Brewster	Fr
OL	69	Matthew Oubre	So
OL	71	Joshua Pershon	Fr
OL	72	Ethan Cothen	Fr
OL	73	Joseph Gonzales	Fr
OL	74	Kevin Greif	So
OL	77	Hayden Kaaiohelo	Fr
OL	78	John Craven	Jr
WR	80	Martell Hawthorne	Fr
WR	81	Caleb Hobbs	So
WR	82	Trenton Swinton	Fr
TE	83	Tate Smith	Fr
TE	84	DeAndre Jennings	Fr
TE	85	Brannon Beaton	Jr
WR	87	Alvin Phillips	Fr
TE	88	Duncan McVey	Fr
TE	89	Sam McGee	Fr
WR		Izaho Barnes	Fr
OL		Chase Bridgeman	Fr
RB		Markell Hawthorne	Fr
WR		Shane Hudson	Fr
WR		Austin Krautz	Fr
QB		Adam Morse	Fr
TE		Mason Sikes	Fr
OL		Trevon Simpson	Fr
WR		Caisen Sullivan	Fr

Defense

Pos.	#	Name	Class
DB	10	Devon Jernigan	Fr
DB	18	Zae Giles	Fr
DB	19	Jalen Barnes	Jr
DB	20	Rodney Randle, JR	Fr
DB	23	Lloyd Julian	Jr
LB	24	Mike Hargis	Sr
LB	28	Zach Johnson	Jr
LB	29	Xavier Bethany	Jr
LB	30	Dedrick Garner	Jr
LB	32	Anthony Beard	Sr
LB	38	Eddie McGill	Jr
LB	42	Bear Christianson	Fr
LB	45	Matt Tillett	So
LB	47	Kade Burman	So
LB	48	Kevin O'Neill	Fr
LB	49	Marcus Odell	Fr
LB	51	Ty Alexander	So
LB	52	Reggie Long	So
LB	55	Matt Johnson	Jr
DE	56	Manessah Miles	Jr
DL	62	Seth Adams	So
DL	65	Omar Tebo	Jr
DB	86	Jared Gieseke	So
DL	92	Koby Couron	Jr
DL	93	William Wowkanyn	Jr
DL	94	Larry Carroll	Jr
DL	98	Marcus Abbott	Fr
DL		Caleb Abrom	Fr
DL		Jaylon Bowden	Jr
LB		Jarret Carpenter	Fr
LB		Mike Coats	Fr
LB		Daniel Crosley	Fr
DB		Blake George	Fr
DE		James Jeffery	Fr
DE		Demontrai Lewis	Jr
LB		Cameron Minger	Fr
LB		Del'Chaun Rushing	Fr
DB		Shyler Staton	Fr
DL		Tre Towery	Fr

Special teams

Pos.	#	Name	Class
ATH	11	Chaston Brooks	Fr
K/P	31	Juan Carranco	Jr
K	46	Alex Ball	Jr
DS	54	Zach Roberts	So
K	96	Josh Davis	So
P		Mitchell Gray	RFr
ATH		Kendrick King	Fr
DS		Christian Langston	Fr

Head coach

- Ray Woodard (Texas)

Coordinators/assistant coaches

- Chuck Langston (Oklahoma)
  Offensive coordinator/Offensive Line
- Trey Haverty (Texas Tech)
  Defensive coordinator
- Arlington Nunn (Clemson)
  Receivers
- Ben Beasley (McNeese State)
  Secondary, Recruiting Coordinator
- Brian Morgan (Grambling State)
  Running Backs
- Ramon Flanigan (SMU)
  Quarterbacks
- Willie Mack Garza (Texas)
  Secondary
- Jeff Breaux (Nicholls State)
  Director of Operations
- Joshua Yonker (Northern Colorado)
  Head Athletic Trainer

Legend

- (C) Team captain
- (S) Suspended
- (I) Ineligible
- Injured
- Redshirt

Roster

== Schedule ==
Lamar University announced its 2016 football schedule on February 17, 2016. According to the announcement, the 2016 schedule will consist of eleven games with a conference schedule of nine games. Out of conference games are the season home opener against the Coastal Carolina Chanticleers which will be in its first year of transition to NCAA Division I (FBS), followed by an away game against NCAA Division I (FBS) American Athletic Conference member, Houston Cougars. Six of the games, including five Southland Conference games, will be played at home at Provost Umphrey Stadium.

Date	Time	Opponent	Site	TV	Result	Attendance
September 3	7:00 pm	No. 16 Coastal Carolina*	Provost Umphrey Stadium; Beaumont, TX	ESPN3	L 14–38	8,697
September 10	11:00 am	at No. 6 (FBS) Houston*	TDECU Stadium; Houston, TX	ESPN3, ASN	L 0–42	39,402
September 17	7:00 pm	No. 3 Sam Houston State	Provost Umphrey Stadium; Beaumont, TX	ESPN3	L 31–44	8,343
October 1	7:00 pm	Southeastern Louisiana	Provost Umphrey Stadium; Beaumont, TX	ESPN3	W 38–14	7,032
October 8	6:00 pm	at Abilene Christian	Shotwell Stadium; Abilene, TX	ACUSports	W 38–10	6,232
October 15	6:00 pm	Northwestern State	Provost Umphrey Stadium; Beaumont, TX	ESPN3	W 32–31	7,159
October 22	6:00 pm	at No. 20 Central Arkansas	Estes Stadium; Conway, AR	ESPN3	L 12–22	10,257
October 29	6:00 pm	Houston Baptist^{†}	Provost Umphrey Stadium; Beaumont, TX	ESPN3	L 17–24	7,777
November 3	6:00 pm	at Nicholls State	Manning Field at John L. Guidry Stadium; Thibodaux, LA	ESPN3	L 10–35	7,121
November 12	6:00 pm	Incarnate Word	Provost Umphrey Stadium; Beaumont, TX	ESPN3	L 28–35	5,566
November 19	6:00 pm	at McNeese State	Cowboy Stadium; Lake Charles, LA (Battle of the Border)	AACI	L 10–41	8,804
*Non-conference game; ^{†}Homecoming; Rankings from STATS Poll released prior to the game; All times are in Central time

== Game summaries ==
=== Coastal Carolina ===
Coastal Carolina at Lamar

Team	1	2	3	4	Total
• #16 Chanticleers	3	0	25	10	38
Cardinals	7	7	0	0	14

- Date: September 3
- Location: Provost Umphrey Stadium
  Beaumont, TX
- Game start: 7:00 PM CDT
- Elapsed time: 3:05
- Game attendance: 8,697
- Game weather: 88 °F (31 °C) • Clear skies
- Referee: Mark Vanderveld
- Television network: ESPN3

Scoring summary
1	9:20	Coastal Carolina	Ryan Granger 40 yard field goal, Drive: 9 plays, 31 yards, 2:16	0–3
1	0:00	Lamar	Kade Harrington 59 yard run (Alex Ball kick), Drive: 2 plays, 59 yards, 0:10	7–3
2	2:38	Lamar	Kade Harrington 64 yard run (Alex Ball kick), Drive: 2 plays, 71 yards, 0:38	14–3
3	10:50	Coastal Carolina	Richie Sampson 71 yard interception return (A.J. Sattinger pass from Chris Jones for two point conv.), Drive: 6 plays, 39 yards, 2:45	14–11
3	9:01	Coastal Carolina	Osharmar Abercrombie 26 yard run (Ryan Granger kick), Drive: 2 plays, 26 yards, 0:15	14–18
3	3:35	Coastal Carolina	Ryan Granger 34 yard field goal, Drive: 11 plays, 43 yards, 3:57	14–21
3	1:20	Coastal Carolina	De'Angelo Henderson 9 yard run (Ryan Granger kick), Drive: 3 plays, 40 yards, 0:35	14–28
4	6:12	Coastal Carolina	Ryan Granger 24 yard field goal, Drive: 7 plays, 53 yards, 3:02	14–31
4	0:09	Coastal Carolina	De'Angelo Henderson 2 yard run (Ryan Granger kick), Drive: 7 plays, 45 yards, 3:57	14–38

=== @ Houston ===
Lamar at Houston

Team	1	2	3	4	Total
Cardinals	0	0	0	0	0
• #6 (FBS) Cougars	14	14	7	7	42

- Date: September 10
- Location: TDECU Stadium
  Houston, TX
- Game start: 11:00 AM CDT
- Elapsed time: 2:43 (3.5 hour lightning delay)
- Game attendance: 39,402
- Game weather: 88 °F (31 °C) • Wind N 3 mph (4.8 km/h) • Cloudy and humid
- Referee: Rick Loumiet
- Television network: ESPN3

Scoring summary
1	12:00	Houston	Kyle Postma 39 yard run (Ty Cummings kick), Drive: 4 plays, 70 yards, 1:31	0–7
1	0:33	Houston	Kevrin Justice 1 yard run (Ty Cummings kick), Drive: 4 plays, 36 yards, 0:53	0–14
2	7:33	Houston	Mulbah Car 2 yard run (Ty Cummings kick), Drive: 13 plays, 91 yards, 4:36	0–21
2	5:02	Houston	Kevrin Justice 1 yard run (Ty Cummings kick), Drive: 7 plays, 18 yards, 2:31	0–28
3	11:34	Houston	Kyle Postma 5 yard run (Ty Cummings kick), Drive: 7 plays, 40 yards, 3:26	0–35
4	11:12	Houston	Josh Burrell 2 yard run (Ty Cummings kick), Drive: 4 plays, 23 yards, 1:08	0–42

=== Sam Houston State ===
Sam Houston State at Lamar

Team	1	2	3	4	Total
• #3 Bearkats	14	16	7	7	44
Cardinals	3	0	14	14	31

- Date: September 17
- Location: Provost Umphrey Stadium
  Beaumont, TX
- Game start: 7:00 PM CDT
- Elapsed time: 3:40
- Game attendance: 8,343
- Game weather: 92 °F (33 °C) • Hot and humid
- Referee: Marvel July
- Television network: ESPN3

Scoring summary
1	13:32	Sam Houston State	Corey Avery 9 yard run (Luc Swimberghe kick), Drive: 5 plays, 75 yards, 1:29	0–7
1	3:32	Lamar	Alex Ball 44 yard field goal, Drive: 18 plays, 54 yards, 7:38	3–7
1	2:07	Sam Houston State	Corey Avery 35 yard pass from Briscoe, Jeremi (Swimberghe, Luc kick), Drive: 5 plays, 86 yards, 1:16	3–14
2	5:27	Sam Houston State	P. J. Hall -8 yard safety, Drive: 2 plays, -8 yards, 0:39	3–16
2	4:54	Sam Houston State	Derrick Dick 35 yard pass from Briscoe, Jeremi (Luc Swimberghe kick), Drive: 2 plays, 65 yards, 0:33	3–23
2	1:32	Sam Houston State	Remus Bulmer 4 yard run (Luc Swimberghe kick), Drive: 4 plays, 75 yards, 1:10	3–30
3	13:37	Lamar	Zae Giles 56 yard pass from Andrew Allen (Ball, Alex kick), Drive: 5 plays, 79 yards, 1:19	10–30
3	3:50	Sam Houston State	Tyler Scott 14 yard pass from Briscoe, Jeremi (Luc Swimberghe kick), Drive: 4 plays, 50 yards, 1:38	10–37
3	0:47	Lamar	Brenda Langley 55 yard run (Alex Ball kick), Drive: 6 plays, 74 yards, 2:58	17–37
4	6:00	Lamar	Carson Earp 67 yard run (Alex Ball kick), Drive: 7 plays, 99 yards, 2:56	24–37
4	3:37	Sam Houston State	Javin Webb 2 yard run (Luc Swimberghe kick), Drive: 8 plays, 51 yards, 2:22	24–44
4	0:48	Lamar	Kendrick King 34 yard pass from Andrew Allen (Alex Ball kick), Drive: 8 plays, 74 yards, 2:41	31–44

=== Southeastern Louisiana ===
Southeastern Louisiana at Lamar

Team	1	2	3	4	Total
Lions	0	7	0	7	14
• Cardinals	14	3	14	7	38

- Date: October 1
- Location: Provost Umphrey Stadium
  Beaumont, TX
- Game start: 7:00 PM CDT
- Elapsed time: 3:13
- Game attendance: 7,032
- Game weather: 75 °F (24 °C) • Wind 2 mph (3.2 km/h) • Cloudy
- Referee: Kevin Boatmann
- Television network: ESPN3

Scoring summary
1	3:33	Lamar	Kendrick King 6 yard run (Alex Ball kick), Drive: 7 plays, 80 yards, 2:48	7–0
1	2:13	Lamar	Carson Earp 17 yard run (Alex Ball kick), Drive: 2 plays, 17 yards, 0:10	14–0
2	1:05	Southeastern Louisiana	Rasheed Harrell 10 yard run (Jonathan Tatum kick), Drive: 7 plays, 74 yards, 1:26	14–7
2	0:00	Lamar	Alex Ball 38 yard field goal, Drive: 8 plays, 45 yards, 1:05	17–7
3	9:06	Lamar	Carson Earp 13 yard run (Alex Ball kick), Drive: 8 plays, 83 yards, 3:01	24–7
3	2:15	Lamar	Kad Harrington 15 yard run (Alex Ball kick), Drive: 5 plays, 43 yards, 2:32	31–7
4	11:06	Lamar	Andrew Allen 6 yard run (Alex Ball kick), Drive: 5 plays, 31 yards, 2:32	38–7
4	2:37	Southeastern Louisiana	Joe Pack 12 yard pass from Justin Alo (Jonathan Tatum kick), Drive: 7 plays, 57 yards, 2:13	38–14

=== @ Abilene Christian ===
Lamar at Abilene Christian

Team	1	2	3	4	Total
• Cardinals	0	17	14	7	38
Wildcats	3	0	7	0	10

- Date: October 8
- Location: Shotwell Stadium
  Abilene, TX
- Game start: 6:00 PM CDT
- Elapsed time: 2:52
- Game attendance: 6,232
- Game weather: 71 °F (22 °C) • Wind ENE 6 mph (9.7 km/h) • Sunny
- Referee: Marvel July

Scoring summary
1	12:34	Abilene Christian	Nik Grau 22 yard field goal, Drive: 6 plays, 69 yards, 2:26	3–0
2	13:03	Lamar	Zae Giles 38 yard run (Alex Ball kick), Drive: 9 plays, 81 yards, 4:29	7–3
2	5:28	Lamar	Alex Ball 21 yard field goal, Drive: 14 plays, 76 yards, 6:18	10–3
2	0:43	Lamar	Zae Giles 6 yard pass from Carson Earp (Alex Ball kick), Drive: 9 plays, 84 yards, 3:25	17–3
3	10:04	Lamar	DeWan Thompson 7 yard run (Alex Ball kick), Drive: 3 plays, 32 yards, 1:36	24–3
3	2:53	Lamar	Kad Harrington 28 yard run (Juan Carranco kick), Drive: 8 plays, 76 yards, 4:33	31–3
3	0:10	Abilene Christian	Cody Ennis 6 yard pass from Parker McKenzie (Nik Grau kick), Drive: 12 plays, 61 yards, 2:36	31–10
4	12:05	Lamar	Austin Krautz 19 yard run (Juan Carranco kick), Drive: 6 plays, 66 yards, 2:59	38–10

=== Northwestern State ===
Northwestern State at Lamar

Team	1	2	3	4	Total
Demons	3	14	7	7	31
• Cardinals	0	9	6	17	32

- Date: October 15
- Location: Provost Umphrey Stadium
  Beaumont, TX
- Game start: 6:00 PM CDT
- Elapsed time: 3:30
- Game attendance: 7,159
- Game weather: 81 °F (27 °C) • Wind SSE 8 mph (13 km/h) • Partly cloudy
- Referee: Ross Smith
- Television network: ESPN3

Scoring summary
1	6:58	Northwestern State	Eric Piccione 45 yard field goal, Drive: 8 plays, 37 yards, 2:32	0–3
2	14:57	Northwestern State	De'Mar Llorens 1 yard run (Eric Piccione kick), Drive: 10 plays, 54 yards, 4:23	0–10
2	8:44	Lamar	Juan Carranco 22 yard field goal, Drive: 15 plays, 72 yards, 6:08	3–10
2	3:03	Northwestern State	Charles Vaughn 1 yard run (Eric Piccione kick), Drive: 4 plays, 34 yards, 1:26	3–17
2	0:12	Lamar	Michael Handy 10 yard pass from Carson Earp (Juan Carranco kick blocked), Drive: 14 plays, 75 yards, 2:50	9–17
3	13:59	Northwestern State	De'Mar Llorens 8 yard run (Eric Piccione kick), Drive: 3 plays, 77 yards, 0:57	9–24
3	13:13	Lamar	Dewan Thompson 86 yard pass from Carson Earp (Dewan Thompson two-point run conv. failed) Drive: 2 plays, 83 yards, 0:41	15–24
4	9:06	Lamar	Juan Carranco 30 yard field goal, Drive: 15 plays, 68 yards, 5:09	18–24
4	6:44	Northwestern State	Jared West 2 yard run (Eric Piccione kick), Drive: 5 plays, 74 yards, 2:12	18–31
4	1:43	Lamar	Marcus Daggs 36 yard pass from Carson Earp (Juan Carranco kick), Drive: 5 plays, 74 yards, 1:07	25–31
4	0:06	Lamar	DeWan Thompson 22 yard pass from Carson Earp (Juan Carranco kick), Drive: 9 plays, 58 yards, 1:30	32–31

=== @ Central Arkansas ===
Lamar at Central Arkansas

Team	1	2	3	4	Total
Cardinals	3	3	0	6	12
• #20 Bears	0	10	9	3	22

- Date: October 22
- Location: Estes Stadium
  Conway, AR
- Game start: 6:00 PM CDT
- Elapsed time: 3:18
- Game attendance: 10,257
- Game weather: 71 °F (22 °C) • Wind SSW 5 mph (8.0 km/h) • Sunny
- Referee: B. Van Vark
- Television network: ESPN3

Scoring summary
1	10:50	Lamar	Juan Carranco 30 yard field goal, Drive: 12 plays, 63 yards, 4:10	3–0
2	13:46	Central Arkansas	Keshawn Ledet 7 yard run (Matt Cummins kick), Drive: 3 plays, 19 yards, 0:55	3–7
2	8:00	Central Arkansas	Matt Cummins 19 yard field goal, Drive: 8 plays, 54 yards, 3:46	3–10
2	1:41	Lamar	Juan Carranco 26 yard field goal, Drive: 10 plays, 25 yards, 3:27	6–10
3	10:29	Central Arkansas	Team 1 yard Safety, Drive: 2 plays, -1 yard, 0:12	6–12
3	9:15	Central Arkansas	Kelton Warren 20 yard pass from Hay Hildebrand (Matt Cummins kick), Drive: 4 plays, 56 yards, 1:12	6–19
4	9:51	Central Arkansas	Matt Cummins 38 yard field goal, Drive: 8 plays, 54 yards, 3:19	6–22
4	5:28	Lamar	Andrew Allen 2 yard run (two-point pass conv. failed), Drive: 12 plays, 56 yards, 4:19	12–22

=== Houston Baptist (Homecoming Game) ===
Houston Baptist at Lamar

Team	1	2	3	4	Total
• Huskies	7	0	10	7	24
Cardinals	7	3	0	7	17

- Date: October 29
- Location: Provost Umphrey Stadium
  Beaumont, TX
- Game start: 6:00 PM CDT
- Elapsed time: 3:32
- Game attendance: 7,777
- Game weather: 80 °F (27 °C) • Sunny and warm
- Referee: M. Vanderveld
- Television network: ESPN3

Scoring summary
1	12:53	Houston Baptist	B.J. Kelly 3 yard run (Alec Chadwick kick), Drive: 4 plays, 14 yards, 1:47	0–7
1	7:08	Lamar	Zae Giles 6 yard pass from Case Robinson (Juan Carranco kick), Drive: 4 plays, 60 yards, 2:24	7–7
2	2:03	Lamar	Juan Carranco 26 yard field goal, Drive: 7 plays, 57 yards, 3:02	10–7
3	12:04	Houston Baptist	Alec Chadwick 33 yard field goal, Drive: 7 plays, 47 yards, 2:48	10–10
3	5:21	Houston Baptist	Mev Ajdin 31 yard pass from Tony Dawson (Alec Chadwick kick), Drive: 3 plays, 38 yards, 0:56	10–17
4	12:09	Houston Baptist	Isaiah Hall 44 yard pass from Tony Dawson (Alec Chadwick kick), Drive: 5 plays, 67 yards, 2:03	10–24
4	7:57	Lamar	Dewan Lee Thompson 8 yard pass from Adam Morse (Juan Carranco kick), Drive: 9 plays, 46 yards, 2:38	17–24

=== @ Nicholls ===
Lamar at Nicholls

Team	1	2	3	4	Total
Cardinals	0	3	0	7	10
• Colonels	7	14	7	7	35

- Date: November 3
- Location: Manning Field at John L. Guidry Stadium
  Thibodaux, LA
- Game start: 6:00 PM CST
- Elapsed time: 2:55
- Game attendance: 7,121
- Game weather: 83 °F (28 °C) • Wind ESE 6 mph (9.7 km/h) • Clear
- Referee: Dan Lewis
- Television network: ESPN3

Scoring summary
1	8:56	Nicholls	Chase Fourcade 9 yard run (David McKey kick), Drive: 13 plays, 67 yards, 6:04	0–7
2	11:55	Lamar	Juan Carranco 27 yard field goal, Drive: 10 plays, 60 yards, 3:20	3–7
2	9:39	Nicholls	Damion Jeanpiere 25 yard pass from Chase Fourcade (David McKey kick), Drive: 7 plays, 60 yards, 2:10	3–14
2	1:52	Nicholls	Mason Boudreaux 4 yard run (David McKey kick), Drive: 3 plays, 16 yards, 1:12	3–21
3	2:29	Nicholls	Mason Boudreaux 1 yard run (David McKey kick), Drive: 3 plays, 80 yards, 1:06	3–28
4	12:29	Nicholls	Chase Fourcade 1 yard run (David McKey kick), Drive: 8 plays, 75 yards, 3:07	3–35
4	3:14	Lamar	Zae Giles 13 yard pass from Adam Morse (Juan Carranco kick), Drive: 9 plays, 87 yards, 3:48	10–35

=== Incarnate Word ===
Incarnate Word at Lamar

Team	1	2	3	4	Total
• Cardinals (UIW)	7	0	14	14	35
Cardinals (LU)	7	0	14	7	28

- Date: November 12
- Location: Provost Umphrey Stadium
  Beaumont, TX
- Game start: 6:00 PM CST
- Elapsed time: 3:51
- Game attendance: 5,566
- Game weather: 69 °F (21 °C) • Clear skies
- Referee: Kevin Boatmann
- Television network: ESPN3
Sources: Box Score

Scoring summary
1	14:46	Lamar	Zae Giles 98 yard kickoff return (Juan Carranco kick), Drive: 0 plays, 0 yards, 0:14	7–0
1	13:49	Incarnate Word	Kody Edwards 65 yard pass from Trent Brittain (Cody Seidel kick), Drive: 2 plays, 69 yards, 0:48	7–7
3	13:11	Lamar	Brendan Langley 90 yard punt return (Juan Carranco kick), Drive: 3 plays, 7 yards, 1:42	14–7
3	8:27	Incarnate Word	Marquis Lawson 35 yard pass from Taylor Laird (Cody Seidel kick), Drive: 4 plays, 67 yards, 1:32	14–14
3	1:49	Incarnate Word	Jordan Hicks 30 yard pass from Trent Brittain (Cody Seidel kick), Drive: 4 plays, 59 yards, 1:41	14–21
3	0:53	Lamar	DeWan Thompson 26 yard pass from Adam Morse (Juan Carranco kick), Drive: 1 play, 26 yards, 0:05	21–21
4	10:08	Lamar	Brendan Langley 75 yard punt return (Juan Carranco kick), Drive: 3 plays, 3 yards, 1:12	28–21
4	6:04	Incarnate Word	Dorland Fields 9 yard run (Cody Seidel kick), Drive: 10 plays, 68 yards, 3:56	28–28
4	2:48	Incarnate Word	Dorland Fields 15 yard run (Cody Seidel kick), Drive: 4 plays, 81 yards, 1:45	28–35

=== @ McNeese State ===
Lamar at McNeese State

Team	1	2	3	4	Total
Cardinals	0	3	0	7	10
• Cowboys	14	14	7	6	41

- Date: November 19
- Location: Cowboy Stadium
  Lake Charles, LA
- Game start: 6:00 PM CST
- Elapsed time: 3:07
- Game attendance: 8,804
- Game weather: 56 °F (13 °C) • Wind N 7 mph (11 km/h) • Clear, 29% relative humidity
- Referee: Marvel July
- Television network: AACI

Scoring summary
1	13:26	McNeese State	Ryan Ross 6 yard run (Gunnar Raborn kick), Drive: 4 plays, 54 yards, 1:34	0–7
1	0:40	McNeese State	Dylan Long 3 yard run (Gunnar Raborn kick), Drive: 18 plays, 94 yards, 8:21	0–14
2	13:09	McNeese State	Darious Crawley 19 yard pass from James Tabary (Gunnar Raborn kick), Drive: 3 plays, 84 yards, 1:11	0–21
2	8:33	Lamar	Juan Carranco 37 yard field goal, Drive: 10 plays, 46 yards, 4:36	3–21
2	4:23	McNeese State	Justin Pratt 3 yard run (Gunnar Raborn kick), Drive: 5 plays, 31 yards, 2:33	3–28
3	3:11	McNeese State	Jermaine Antoine 65 yard interception return (Gunnar Raborn kick), Drive: 5 plays, 28 yards, 3:03	3–35
4	13:58	Lamar	Martell Hawthorne 32 yard pass from Adam Morse (Juan Carranco kick), Drive: 4 plays, 36 yards, 0:54	10–35
4	11:34	McNeese State	James Tabary 26 yard run (Gunnar Raborn kick blocked), Drive: 5 plays, 62 yards, 2:24	10–41
