= 2016 Nicholls State Colonels football team =

American college football season

2016 Nicholls State Colonels football
- Conference: Southland Conference
- Record: 5–6 (5–4 Southland)
- Head coach: Tim Rebowe (2nd season)
- Offensive coordinator: Rob Christophel (2nd season)
- Offensive scheme: Spread
- Defensive coordinator: Tommy Rybacki (2nd season)
- Base defense: Multiple 4–3
- Home stadium: John L. Guidry Stadium

2016 Southland Conference football standings
| | Conf. | | | Overall |
| Team | W | | L | W | | L |
|---|---|---|---|---|---|---|
| No. 5 Sam Houston State $^ | 9 | – | 0 | 12 | – | 1 |
| No. 14 Central Arkansas ^ | 8 | – | 1 | 10 | – | 3 |
| SE Louisiana | 7 | – | 2 | 7 | – | 4 |
| McNeese State | 5 | – | 4 | 6 | – | 5 |
| Nicholls State | 5 | – | 4 | 5 | – | 6 |
| Stephen F. Austin | 4 | – | 5 | 5 | – | 6 |
| Houston Baptist | 3 | – | 5 | 4 | – | 7 |
| Incarnate Word * | 3 | – | 6 | 3 | – | 8 |
| Lamar | 3 | – | 6 | 3 | – | 8 |
| Abilene Christian * | 2 | – | 7 | 2 | – | 9 |
| Northwestern State | 0 | – | 9 | 1 | – | 10 |
$ – Conference champion; ^ – FCS playoff participant; * – ineligible for FCS playoffs due to transition from NCAA Division II; Rankings from STATS poll

The 2016 Nicholls State Colonels football team represented Nicholls State University as a member of the Southland Conference during the 2016 NCAA Division I FCS football season. Led by second-year head coach Tim Rebowe, the Colonels compiled an overall record of 5–6 with a mark of 5–4 in conference play, tying for fourth place in the Southland. Nicholls State played home games at John L. Guidry Stadium in Thibodaux, Louisiana.

== Schedule ==
| Date | Time | Opponent | Site | TV | Result | Attendance |
|---|---|---|---|---|---|---|
| September 10 | 11:00 am | at No. 9 (FBS) Georgia* | Sanford Stadium; Athens, GA | SECN | L 24–26 | 92,746 |
| September 17 | 3:00 pm | Incarnate Word | John L. Guidry Stadium; Thibodaux, LA | NOLA | W 35–28 | 6,283 |
| September 24 | 6:00 pm | at South Alabama* | Ladd–Peebles Stadium; Mobile, AL | ESPN3 | L 40–41 ^{OT} | 13,086 |
| October 1 | 6:00 pm | at No. 23 McNeese State | Cowboy Stadium; Lake Charles, LA | CST | L 13–38 | 10,130 |
| October 8 | 3:00 pm | Stephen F. Austin | John L. Guidry Stadium; Thibodaux, LA | ASN | W 35–28 ^{2OT} | 9,002 |
| October 15 | 7:00 pm | at Houston Baptist | Husky Stadium; Houston, TX | FSGO | W 33–30 ^{OT} | 3,217 |
| October 22 | 3:00 pm | No. 1 Sam Houston State | John L. Guidry Stadium; Thibodaux, LA | ASN | L 21–38 | 7,759 |
| October 29 | 6:00 pm | at Northwestern State | Harry Turpin Stadium; Natchitoches, LA (NSU Challenge) | WHNO | W 31–14 | 5,825 |
| November 3 | 6:00 pm | Lamar | John L. Guidry Stadium; Thibodaux, LA | ESPN3 | W 35–10 | 7,121 |
| November 12 | 2:30 pm | at No. 13 Central Arkansas | Estes Stadium; Conway, AR | ASN | L 24–31 | 5,785 |
| November 17 | 6:00 pm | Southeastern Louisiana | John L. Guidry Stadium; Thibodaux, LA (River Bell Classic) | ASN | L 42–44 | 7,002 |
*Non-conference game; Rankings from STATS Poll released prior to the game; All times are in Central time

== Game summaries ==
=== @ Georgia ===
Nicholls at Georgia

| Team | 1 | 2 | 3 | 4 | Total |
|---|---|---|---|---|---|
| Colonels | 0 | 7 | 7 | 10 | 24 |
| • #9 (FBS) Bulldogs | 7 | 3 | 16 | 0 | 26 |

- Date: September 10
- Location: Sanford Stadium
  Athens, GA
- Game start: 11:00 AM CDT
- Elapsed time: 3:12
- Game attendance: 92,746
- Game weather: 89 °F (32 °C) • Wind 3 mph (4.8 km/h) • Sunny, 47% humidity
- Referee: Brad Rogers
- Television network: SECN

Scoring summary
| 1 | 12:54 | Georgia | Nick Chubb 6 yard run (William Ham kick), Drive: 5 plays, 67 yards, 2:06 | 0–7 |
| 2 | 7:57 | Georgia | William Ham 23 yard field goal, Drive: 14 plays, 90 yards, 7:23 | 0–10 |
| 2 | 0:45 | Nicholls | Dontrell Taylor 4 yard run (David McKey kick), Drive: 6 plays, 30 yards, 2:01 | 7–10 |
| 3 | 12:22 | Georgia | William Ham 26 yard field goal, Drive: 4 plays, 5 yards, 0:54 | 7–13 |
| 3 | 6:48 | Nicholls | Jarrell Rogers 20 yard pass from Chase Fourcade (David McKey kick), Drive: 11 plays, 75 yards, 5:34 | 14–13 |
| 3 | 5:43 | Georgia | Isaiah McKenzie 66 yard pass from Jacob Eason (William Ham kick), Drive: 3 plays, 67 yards, 1:05 | 14–20 |
| 3 | 4:50 | Georgia | Lorenzo Carter 24 yard fumble return (two-point run conv. failed), Drive: 2 plays, -6 yards, 0:53 | 14–26 |
| 4 | 7:50 | Nicholls | David McKey 26 yard field goal, Drive: 4 plays, -1 yard, 1:20 | 17–26 |
| 4 | 3:42 | Nicholls | C.J. Bates 6 yard pass from Chase Fourcade (David McKey kick), Drive: 2 plays, 9 yards, 0:36 | 24–26 |

=== Incarnate Word ===
Incarnate Word at Nicholls

| Team | 1 | 2 | 3 | 4 | Total |
|---|---|---|---|---|---|
| Cardinals | 0 | 6 | 0 | 22 | 28 |
| • Colonels | 14 | 0 | 7 | 14 | 35 |

- Date: September 17
- Location: Manning Field at John L. Guidry Stadium
  Thibodaux, LA
- Game start: 3:00 PM CDT
- Elapsed time: 3:22
- Game attendance: 6,283
- Game weather: 83 °F (28 °C) • Wind SSW 4 mph (6.4 km/h) • Overcast
- Referee: Vidal Jones
- TV announcers (NOLA): Ken Berthelot, Wayde Keiser
Sources: Box Score

Scoring summary
| 1 | 11:44 | Nicholls | Dami Jeanpiere 23 yard pass from Chase Fourcade (David McKey kick), Drive: 8 plays, 70 yards, 2:21 | 7–0 |
| 1 | 9:41 | Nicholls | Dontrel Taylor 3 yard run (David McKey kick), Drive: 2 plays, 40 yards, 0:29 | 14–0 |
| 2 | 6:44 | Incarnate Word | Robert Hayes 76 yard blocked field goal return (Cody Seidel kick blocked), Drive: 6 plays, 39 yards, 2:14 | 14–6 |
| 3 | 7:24 | Nicholls | C.J. Okpalobi 5 yard run (David McKey kick), Drive: 16 plays, 75 yards, 7:36 | 21–6 |
| 4 | 14:56 | Nicholls | C.J. Okpalobi 4 yard run (David McKey kick), Drive: 7 plays, 71 yards, 3:02 | 28–6 |
| 4 | 14:38 | Incarnate Word | Desmond Hite 85 yard run (Breylann McCollum pass), Drive: 1 play, 85 yards, 0:12 | 28–14 |
| 4 | 11:44 | Nicholls | Chris Booker 11 yard pass from Chase Fourcade (David McKey kick), Drive: 6 plays, 35 yards, 2:43 | 35–14 |
| 4 | 9:23 | Incarnate Word | Jamari Gilbert 40 yard pass from Trent Brittain (Cody Seidel kick), Drive: 6 plays, 74 yards, 2:11 | 35–21 |
| 4 | 4:36 | Incarnate Word | Jamari Gilbert 63 yard pass from Trent Brittain (Cody Seidel kick), Drive: 2 plays, 58 yards, 0:43 | 35–28 |

=== @ South Alabama ===
Nicholls at South Alabama

| Team | 1 | 2 | 3 | 4 | OT | Total |
|---|---|---|---|---|---|---|
| Colonels | 0 | 23 | 3 | 8 | 6 | 40 |
| • Jaguars | 7 | 17 | 3 | 7 | 7 | 41 |

- Date: September 24
- Location: Ladd–Peebles Stadium
  Mobile, AL
- Game start: 6:00 PM CDT
- Elapsed time: 3:59
- Game attendance: 13,086
- Game weather: 90 °F (32 °C) • Wind S 4 mph (6.4 km/h) • Partly cloudy
- Referee: Marshall Lewis
- Television network: ESPN3

Scoring summary
| 1 | 14:48 | South Alabama | Xavier Johnson 95 yard kickoff return (Gavin Patterson kick), Drive: 0 plays, 0 yards, 0:12 | 0–7 |
| 2 | 14:09 | South Alabama | Dami Ayoola 3 yard run (Gavin Patterson kick), Drive: 9 plays, 71 yards, 4:11 | 0–14 |
| 2 | 13:37 | Nicholls | Chris Major 33 yard interception return (David McKey kick), Drive: 1 play, 0 yards, 0:09 | 7–14 |
| 2 | 11:09 | Nicholls | Christian Boutte 51 yard return of blocked field goal (David McKey kick), Drive: 6 plays, 17 yards, 2:28 | 14–14 |
| 2 | 9:33 | Nicholls | Mason Boudreaux 1 yard run (David McKey kick failed), Drive: 3 plays, 26 yards, 0:50 | 20–14 |
| 2 | 8:06 | Nicholls | David McKey 37 yard field goal, Drive: 4 plays, 6 yards, 1:27 | 23–14 |
| 2 | 6:43 | South Alabama | Xavier Johnson 16 yard run (Gavin Patterson kick), Drive: 3 plays, 62 yards, 1:23 | 23–21 |
| 2 | 4:02 | South Alabama | Gavin Patterson 22 yard field goal, Drive: 5 plays, 18 yards, 1:44 | 23–24 |
| 3 | 12:17 | Nicholls | David McKey 21 yard field goal, Drive: 8 plays, 24 yards, 2:43 | 26–24 |
| 3 | 6:42 | South Alabama | Gavin Patterson 26 yard field goal, Drive: 13 plays, 57 yards, 5:35 | 26–27 |
| 4 | 8:45 | Nicholls | Damion Jeanpiere 16 yard pass from Chase Fourcade (Josh Singleton pass to C.J. Bates for two-point conv.), Drive: 5 plays, 32 yards, 2:33 | 34–27 |
| 4 | 0:16 | South Alabama | Tyrone Williams 9 yard pass from Dallas Davis (Gavin Patterson kick), Drive: 13 plays, 83 yards, 2:31 | 34–34 |
| OT | 15:00 | South Alabama | Xavier Johnson 4 yard run (Gavin Patterson kick), Drive: 6 plays, 25 yards, 0:00 | 34–41 |
| OT | 15:00 | Nicholls | Dontrell Taylor 4 yard run (two-point run conv. failed), Drive: 3 plays, 25 yards, 0:00 | 40–41 |

=== @ McNeese State ===
Nicholls at McNeese State

| Team | 1 | 2 | 3 | 4 | Total |
|---|---|---|---|---|---|
| Colonels | 3 | 0 | 3 | 7 | 13 |
| • #23 Cowboys | 7 | 14 | 7 | 10 | 38 |

- Date: October 1
- Location: Cowboy Stadium
  Lake Charles, LA
- Game start: 6:00 PM CDT
- Elapsed time: 3:18
- Game attendance: 10,130
- Game weather: 80 °F (27 °C) • Wind NE 2 mph (3.2 km/h) • Partly cloudy
- Referee: Dan Lewis
- Television network: CST

Scoring summary
| 1 | 8:10 | McNeese State | Andre Fuller 27 yard interception return (Gunnar Raborn kick), Drive: 3 plays, 6 yards, 1:13 | 0–7 |
| 1 | 3:08 | Nicholls | David McKey 23 yard field goal, Drive: 12 plays, 79 yards, 5:02 | 3–7 |
| 2 | 6:24 | McNeese State | Ryan Ross 4 yard run (Gunnar Raborn kick), Drive: 9 plays, 46 yards, 3:56 | 3–14 |
| 2 | 0:18 | McNeese State | Parker Orgeron 8 yard pass from James Tabary (Gunnar Raborn kick), Drive: 8 plays, 73 yards, 1:46 | 3–21 |
| 3 | 10:44 | Nicholls | David McKey 33 yard field goal, Drive: 11 plays, 72 yards, 4:16 | 6–21 |
| 3 | 5:17 | McNeese State | Ryan Ross 11 yard run (Gunnar Raborn kick), Drive: 12 plays, 66 yards, 5:27 | 6–28 |
| 4 | 13:35 | McNeese State | Gunnar Raborn 37 yard field goal, Drive: 7 plays, 28 yards, 2:35 | 6–31 |
| 4 | 8:10 | McNeese State | Kylon Highshaw 80 yard pass from James Tabary (Gunnar Raborn kick), Drive: 1 play, 80 yards, 0:12 | 6–38 |
| 4 | 3:54 | Nicholls | Team 0 yard fumble return (David McKey kick), Drive: 13 plays, 74 yards, 4:16 | 13–38 |

=== Stephen F. Austin ===
Stephen F. Austin at Nicholls

| Team | 1 | 2 | 3 | 4 | OT | 2OT | Total |
|---|---|---|---|---|---|---|---|
| Lumberjacks | 14 | 0 | 7 | 0 | 7 | 0 | 28 |
| • Colonels | 0 | 14 | 7 | 0 | 7 | 7 | 35 |

- Date: October 8
- Location: John L. Guidry Stadium
  Thibodaux, LA
- Game start: 3:00 PM CDT
- Elapsed time: 3:52
- Game attendance: 9,002
- Game weather: 85 °F (29 °C) • Wind NNW 11 mph (18 km/h) • Sunny
- Referee: Ross Smith
- Television network: ASN

Scoring summary
| 1 | 13:45 | Stephen F. Austin | Joshawa West 30 yard pass from Zach Conque (Storm Ruiz kick), Drive: 4 plays, 65 yards, 1:15 | 0–7 |
| 1 | 12:15 | Stephen F. Austin | Zach Conque 1 yard run (Storm Ruiz kick), Drive: 4 plays, 32 yards, 1:11 | 0–14 |
| 2 | 7:52 | Nicholls | C.J. Okpalobi 1 yard run (David McKey kick), Drive: 9 plays, 85 yards, 3:37 | 7–14 |
| 2 | 0:54 | Nicholls | Chase Fourcade 14 yard run (David McKey kick), Drive: 3 plays, 18 yards, 0:44 | 14–14 |
| 3 | 7:31 | Nicholls | C.J. Okpalobi 36 yard pass from Chase Fourcade (David McKey kick), Drive: 9 plays, 80 yards, 3:39 | 21–14 |
| 3 | 3:34 | Stephen F. Austin | Tamrick Pace 49 yard pass from Zach Conque (Storm Ruiz kick), Drive: 3 plays, 59 yards, 0:29 | 21–21 |
| OT | 15:00 | Stephen F. Austin | Zach Conque 1 yard run (Storm Ruiz kick), Drive: 9 plays, 0 yards, 0:38 | 21–28 |
| OT | 15:00 | Nicholls | Damion Jeanpiere 25 yard pass from Chase Fourcade (David McKey kick), Drive: 1 play, 25 yards, 0:00 | 28–28 |
| 2OT | 15:00 | Nicholls | Chase Fourcade 1 yard run (David McKey kick), Drive: 9 plays, 25 yards, 0:00 | 35–28 |

=== @ Houston Baptist ===
Nicholls at Houston Baptist

| Team | 1 | 2 | 3 | 4 | OT | Total |
|---|---|---|---|---|---|---|
| • Colonels | 7 | 14 | 0 | 6 | 6 | 33 |
| Huskies | 3 | 7 | 10 | 7 | 3 | 30 |

- Date: October 15
- Location: Husky Stadium
  Houston, TX
- Game start: 7:00 PM CDT
- Elapsed time: 3:29
- Game attendance: 3,217
- Game weather: 84 °F (29 °C) • Wind SE 10 mph (16 km/h) • Partly Cloudy
- Referee: Vidal Jones
- TV announcers (FSGO): Neal Raphael, Jeff Power, Ashley Prendergast

Scoring summary
| 1 | 9:17 | Houston Baptist | Alec Chadwick 34 yard field goal, Drive: 15 plays, 58 yards, 5:43 | 0–3 |
| 1 | 4:17 | Nicholls | Ronald Ollie 84 yard blocked field goal return (David McKey kick), Drive: 9 plays, 46 yards, 3:27 | 7–3 |
| 2 | 14:22 | Houston Baptist | B.J. Kelly 2 yard run (Alec Chadwick kick), Drive: 12 plays, 75 yards, 4:49 | 7–10 |
| 2 | 6:37 | Nicholls | Dami Jeanpiere 50 yard pass from Chase Fourcade (David McKey kick), Drive: 5 plays, 65 yards, 2:10 | 14–10 |
| 2 | 3:17 | Nicholls | Chase Fourcade 10 yard run (David McKey kick), Drive: 4 plays, 87 yards, 1:26 | 21–10 |
| 3 | 10:50 | Houston Baptist | Ricard Barnett 6 yard pass from Tony Dawson (Alec Chadwick kick), Drive: 8 plays, 54 yards, 2:48 | 21–17 |
| 3 | 2:07 | Houston Baptist | Alec Chadwick 35 yard field goal, Drive: 14 plays, 68 yards, 5:37 | 21–20 |
| 4 | 11:26 | Nicholls | David McKey 44 yard field goal, Drive: 4 plays, 4 yards, 1:22 | 24–20 |
| 4 | 1:25 | Houston Baptist | Tony Dawson 24 yard run (Alec Chadwick kick), Drive: 14 plays, 94 yards, 5:42 | 24–27 |
| 4 | 0:06 | Nicholls | David McKey 35 yard field goal, Drive: 9 plays, 57 yards, 1:19 | 27–27 |
| OT | 15:00 | Houston Baptist | Alec Chadwick 35 yard field goal, Drive: 9 plays, 0 yards, 0:00 | 27–30 |
| OT | 15:00 | Nicholls | C.J. Okpalobi 12 yard run, Drive: 9 plays, 0 yards, 0:00 | 33–30 |

=== Sam Houston State ===
Sam Houston State at Nicholls

| Team | 1 | 2 | 3 | 4 | Total |
|---|---|---|---|---|---|
| • #1 Bearkats | 10 | 14 | 7 | 7 | 38 |
| Colonels | 0 | 0 | 14 | 7 | 21 |

- Date: October 22
- Location: John L. Guidry Stadium
  Thibodaux, LA
- Game start: 3:00 PM CDT
- Elapsed time: 2:09
- Game attendance: 7,759
- Game weather: 70 °F (21 °C) • Slight wind
- Referee: Michael VanderVelde
- Television network: ASN

Scoring summary
| 1 | 6:52 | Sam Houston State | Luc Swimberghe 41 yard field goal, Drive: 7 plays, 19 yards, 2:19 | 0–3 |
| 1 | 0:16 | Sam Houston State | Javin Webb 1 yard run (Luc Swimberghe kick), Drive: 9 plays, 57 yards, 3:04 | 0–10 |
| 2 | 7:57 | Sam Houston State | Remus Bulmer 3 yard run (Luc Swimberghe kick), Drive: 13 plays, 68 yards, 3:49 | 0–17 |
| 2 | 0:48 | Sam Houston State | Derrick Dick 40 yard pass from Jeremiah Briscoe (Luc Swimberghe kick), Drive: 8 plays, 80 yards, 2:37 | 0–24 |
| 3 | 9:03 | Nicholls | C.J. Okpalobi 16 yard run (David McKey kick), Drive: 13 plays, 75 yards, 5:51 | 7–24 |
| 3 | 4:05 | Sam Houston State | Deon Hutchinson 1 yard pass from Jeremiah Briscoe (Luc Swimberghe kick), Drive: 12 plays, 78 yards, 4:52 | 7–31 |
| 3 | 0:18 | Nicholls | Chase Fourcade 25 yard run (David McKey kick), Drive: 10 plays, 75 yards, 3:47 | 14–31 |
| 4 | 10:11 | Sam Houston State | Deon Hutchinson 2 yard pass from Jeremiah Briscoe (Luc Swimberghe kick), Drive: 11 plays, 84 yards, 4:59 | 14–38 |
| 4 | 1:17 | Nicholls | C.J. Bates 7 yard pass from Chase Fourcade (David McKey kick), Drive: 12 plays, 67 yards, 0:00 | 21–38 |

=== @ Northwestern State ===
Nicholls at Northwestern State

| Team | 1 | 2 | 3 | 4 | Total |
|---|---|---|---|---|---|
| • Colonels | 0 | 14 | 14 | 3 | 31 |
| Demons | 7 | 7 | 0 | 0 | 14 |

- Date: October 29
- Location: Harry Turpin Stadium
  Natchitoches, LA
- Game start: 6:00 PM CDT
- Elapsed time: 3:03
- Game attendance: 5,825
- Game weather: 82 °F (28 °C) • Wind SSE 4 mph (6.4 km/h) • Sunny and warm
- Referee: Kevin Boitmann
- Television network: WHNO

Scoring summary
| 1 | 8:29 | Northwestern State | De'Mard Llorens 34 yard run (Eric Piccione kick), Drive: 7 plays, 75 yards, 2:20 | 0–7 |
| 2 | 14:16 | Nicholls | C.J. Bates 24 yard pass from Chase Fourcade (David McKey kick), Drive: 6 plays, 53 yards, 2:33 | 7–7 |
| 2 | 4:00 | Nicholls | Chase Fourcade 1 yard run (David McKey kick), Drive: 20 plays, 80 yards, 7:52 | 14–7 |
| 2 | 2:16 | Northwestern State | Bobby Chan-Chan 56 yard pass from Brooks Haack (Eric Piccione kick), Drive: 4 plays, 76 yards, 1:43 | 14–14 |
| 3 | 10:50 | Nicholls | C.J. Bates 2 yard pass from Chase Fourcade (David McKey kick), Drive: 11 plays, 60 yards, 4:04 | 21–14 |
| 3 | 7:27 | Nicholls | C.J. Bates 74 yard pass from Chase Fourcade (David McKey kick), Drive: 5 plays, 87 yards, 2:03 | 28–14 |
| 4 | 12:16 | Nicholls | David McKey 31 yard field goal, Drive: 13 plays, 68 yards, 5:02 | 31–14 |

=== Lamar ===
Lamar at Nicholls

| Team | 1 | 2 | 3 | 4 | Total |
|---|---|---|---|---|---|
| Cardinals | 0 | 3 | 0 | 7 | 10 |
| • Colonels | 7 | 14 | 7 | 7 | 35 |

- Date: November 3
- Location: John L. Guidry Stadium
  Thibodaux, LA
- Game start: 6:00 PM CST
- Elapsed time: 2:55
- Game attendance: 7,121
- Game weather: 83 °F (28 °C) • Wind ESE 6 mph (9.7 km/h) • Clear
- Referee: Dan Lewis
- Television network: ESPN3

Scoring summary
| 1 | 8:56 | Nicholls | Chase Fourcade 9 yard run (David McKey kick), Drive: 13 plays, 67 yards, 6:04 | 7–0 |
| 2 | 11:55 | Lamar | Juan Carranco 27 yard field goal, Drive: 10 plays, 60 yards, 3:20 | 7–3 |
| 2 | 9:39 | Nicholls | Damion Jeanpiere 25 yard pass from Chase Fourcade (David McKey kick), Drive: 7 plays, 60 yards, 2:10 | 14–3 |
| 2 | 1:52 | Nicholls | Mason Boudreaux 4 yard run (David McKey kick), Drive: 3 plays, 16 yards, 1:12 | 21–3 |
| 3 | 2:29 | Nicholls | Mason Boudreaux 1 yard run (David McKey kick), Drive: 3 plays, 80 yards, 1:06 | 28–3 |
| 4 | 12:29 | Nicholls | Chase Fourcade 1 yard run (David McKey kick), Drive: 8 plays, 75 yards, 3:07 | 35–3 |
| 4 | 3:14 | Lamar | Zae Giles 13 yard pass from Adam Morse (Juan Carranco kick), Drive: 9 plays, 87 yards, 3:48 | 35–10 |

=== @ Central Arkansas ===
Nicholls at Central Arkansas

| Team | 1 | 2 | 3 | 4 | Total |
|---|---|---|---|---|---|
| Colonels | 0 | 7 | 7 | 10 | 24 |
| • #13 Bears | 0 | 10 | 7 | 14 | 31 |

- Date: November 12
- Location: Estes Stadium
  Conway, AR
- Game start: 3:00 PM CST
- Elapsed time: 3:41
- Game attendance: 5,785
- Referee: Cooper Castleberry
- Television network: ASN

Scoring summary
| 2 | 7:51 | Central Arkansas | Matt Cummins 32 yard field goal, Drive: 5 plays, 54 yards, 2:35 | 3–0 |
| 2 | 4:44 | Nicholls | C.J. Bates 45 yard pass from Chase Fourcade (David McKey kick), Drive: 9 plays, 75 yards, 3:07 | 3–7 |
| 2 | 0:30 | Central Arkansas | Antwon Wells 1 yard run (Matt Cummins kick), Drive: 7 plays, 37 yards, 2:05 | 10–7 |
| 3 | 11:15 | Nicholls | Kyran Irvin 1 yard run (David McKey kick), Drive: 9 plays, 75 yards, 3:45 | 10–14 |
| 3 | 2:09 | Central Arkansas | Carlo Blackman 1 yard run (Matt Cummins kick), Drive: 7 plays, 58 yards, 2:01 | 17–14 |
| 4 | 11:42 | Nicholls | C.J. Bates 80 yard pass from Chase Fourcade (David McKey kick), Drive: 1 plays, 80 yards, 0:14 | 17–21 |
| 4 | 11:16 | Central Arkansas | Carlo Blackman 15 yard run (Matt Cummins kick), Drive: 2 plays, 49 yards, 0:17 | 24–21 |
| 4 | 8:15 | Central Arkansas | Jaylon Lofton 79 yard interception (Matt Cummins kick), Drive: 8 plays, 69 yards, 2:56 | 31–21 |
| 4 | 5:09 | Nicholls | David McKey 46 yard field goal, Drive: 11 plays, 52 yards, 3:00 | 31–24 |

=== Southeastern Louisiana ===
Southeastern Louisiana at Nicholls

| Team | 1 | 2 | 3 | 4 | Total |
|---|---|---|---|---|---|
| • Lions | 14 | 0 | 13 | 17 | 44 |
| Colonels | 0 | 21 | 0 | 21 | 42 |

- Date: November 17
- Location: John L. Guidry Stadium
  Thibodaux, LA
- Game start: 6:00 PM CST
- Elapsed time: 7,002
- Game attendance: 3:54
- Game weather: 69 °F (21 °C) • Wind SE 5 mph (8.0 km/h) • Clear
- Referee: Michael VanderVelde
- Television network: ASN

Scoring summary
| 1 | 2:28 | Southeastern Louisiana | Julius Maracalin 2 yard run (Jonathon Tatum kick), Drive: 9 plays, 65 yards, 3:28 | 0–7 |
| 1 | 1:58 | Southeastern Louisiana | Justin Alo 9 yard run (Jonathon Tatum kick), Drive: 1 play, 9 yards, 0:06 | 0–14 |
| 2 | 11:45 | Nicholls | C.J. Bates 24 yard pass from Chase Fourcade (David McKey kick), Drive: 12 plays, 65 yards, 5:13 | 7–14 |
| 2 | 10:03 | Nicholls | Chase Fourcade 1 yard run (David McKey kick), Drive: 2 plays, 68 yards, 0:30 | 14–14 |
| 2 | 5:24 | Nicholls | Dontrell Taylor 33 yard run (David McKey kick), Drive: 2 plays, 34 yards, 0:37 | 21–14 |
| 3 | 8:59 | Southeastern Louisiana | Javon Conner 9 yard pass from D'Shaie Landor (Jonathon Tatum kick failed), Drive: 3 plays, 10 yards, 0:31 | 21–20 |
| 3 | 3:01 | Southeastern Louisiana | Julius Maracalin 21 yard run (Jonathon Tatum kick), Drive: 8 plays, 90 yards, 3:22 | 21–27 |
| 4 | 13:17 | Southeastern Louisiana | Julius Maracalin 10 yard run (Jonathon Tatum kick), Drive: 6 plays, 75 yards, 3:13 | 21–34 |
| 4 | 12:20 | Nicholls | C.J. Bates 57 yard pass from Chase Fourcade (David McKey kick), Drive: 3 plays, 78 yards, 0:51 | 28–34 |
| 4 | 9:51 | Southeastern Louisiana | Juwan Dickey 48 yard pass from D'Shaie Landor (Jonathon Tatum kick), Drive: 6 plays, 79 yards, 2:21 | 28–41 |
| 4 | 5:04 | Southeastern Louisiana | Dillon Burkhard 22 yard field goal, Drive: 8 plays, 34 yards, 4:16 | 28–44 |
| 4 | 1:18 | Nicholls | Damion Jeanpiere 5 yard pass from Chase Fourcade (Chase Fourcade pass to C.J. Bates for two-point conv.), Drive: 13 plays, 80 yards, 2:19 | 36–44 |
| 4 | 0:04 | Nicholls | Chase Fourcade 2 yard run (two-point pass conv. failed), Drive: 6 plays, 57 yards, 1:07 | 42–44 |
