= 2016 Central Arkansas Bears football team =

American college football season

2016 Central Arkansas Bears football

FCS Playoffs Second Round, L 14–31 vs. Eastern Washington
- Conference: Southland Conference

Ranking
- STATS: No. 14
- FCS Coaches: No. 16
- Record: 10–3 (8–1 Southland)
- Head coach: Steve Campbell (3rd season)
- Offensive coordinator: Nathan Brown (3rd season)
- Offensive scheme: Spread
- Defensive coordinator: Greg Stewart (3rd season)
- Base defense: 4–3
- Home stadium: Estes Stadium

2016 Southland Conference football standings
	Conf.			Overall
Team	W		L	W		L
No. 5 Sam Houston State $^	9	–	0	12	–	1
No. 14 Central Arkansas ^	8	–	1	10	–	3
SE Louisiana	7	–	2	7	–	4
McNeese State	5	–	4	6	–	5
Nicholls State	5	–	4	5	–	6
Stephen F. Austin	4	–	5	5	–	6
Houston Baptist	3	–	5	4	–	7
Incarnate Word *	3	–	6	3	–	8
Lamar	3	–	6	3	–	8
Abilene Christian *	2	–	7	2	–	9
Northwestern State	0	–	9	1	–	10
$ – Conference champion; ^ – FCS playoff participant; * – ineligible for FCS playoffs due to transition from NCAA Division II; Rankings from STATS poll

The 2016 Central Arkansas Bears football team represented the University of Central Arkansas in the 2016 NCAA Division I FCS football season. The Bears were led by third-year head coach Steve Campbell and played their home games at Estes Stadium. They were a member of the Southland Conference. They finished the season 10–3 overall and 8–1 in Southland play to finish in second place. They received an at-large bid to the FCS Playoffs where they defeated Illinois State in the first round, before losing in the second round to Eastern Washington.

== Schedule ==
Date	Time	Opponent	Rank	Site	TV	Result	Attendance
September 1	6:00 pm	Houston Baptist		Estes Stadium; Conway, AR	ASN	W 56–13	9,757
September 10	6:00 pm	Samford*		Estes Stadium; Conway, AR	BNN	L 29–35	9,987
September 17	6:00 pm	Northwestern State		Estes Stadium; Conway, AR	BNN	W 24–10	8,047
September 24	6:00 pm	at Arkansas State*		Centennial Bank Stadium; Jonesboro, AR	ESPN3	W 28–23	28,012
October 1	2:30 pm	at Abilene Christian		Shotwell Stadium; Abilene, TX	SLDN	W 58–27	4,215
October 15	6:00 pm	at McNeese State	No. 23	Cowboy Stadium; Lake Charles, LA (Red Beans and Rice Bowl)	ESPN3	W 35–0	9,253
October 22	6:00 pm	Lamar^{†}	No. 20	Estes Stadium; Conway, AR	ESPN3	W 22–12	10,257
October 29	7:00 pm	at Southeastern Louisiana	No. 19	Strawberry Stadium; Hammond, LA	ESPN3	W 45–10	4,241
November 5	3:00 pm	at Stephen F. Austin	No. 17	Homer Bryce Stadium; Nacogdoches, TX	ASN	W 34–14	10,188
November 12	3:00 pm	Nicholls State	No. 13	Estes Stadium; Conway, AR	ASN	W 31–24	5,785
November 19	2:30 pm	at No. 1 Sam Houston State	No. 11	Bowers Stadium; Huntsville, TX	ESPN3	L 23–59	9,182
November 26	2:00 pm	Illinois State*	No. 14	Estes Stadium; Conway, AR (NCAA Division I First Round)	ESPN3	W 31–24	3,165
December 3	3:00 pm	at No. 3 Eastern Washington*	No. 14	Roos Field; Cheney, WA (NCAA Division I Second Round)	ESPN3	L 14–31	6,085
*Non-conference game; ^{†}Homecoming; Rankings from STATS Poll released prior to the game; All times are in Central time

== Game summaries ==
=== Houston Baptist ===
Houston Baptist at Central Arkansas

Team	1	2	3	4	Total
Huskies	0	3	3	7	13
• Bears	21	21	14	0	56

- Date: September 1
- Location: Estes Stadium
  Conway, AR
- Game start: 6:00 PM CDT
- Elapsed time: 3:22
- Game attendance: 9,757
- Referee: Ross Smith
- TV announcers (ASN): Lincoln Rose, Shea Walker, Kamady Rudd

Scoring summary
1	11:52	Central Arkansas	Desmond Smith 3 yard pass from Hayden Hildebrand (Matt Cummins kick), Drive: 5 plays, 54 yards, 1:29	7–0
1	5:51	Central Arkansas	Kelton Warren 14 yard run (Matt Cummins kick), Drive: 6 plays, 63 yards, 1:28	14–0
1	2:18	Central Arkansas	Hayden Hildebrand 1 yard run (Matt Cummins kick), Drive: 8 plays, 67 yards, 2:24	21–0
2	12:17	Central Arkansas	Tyler Williams 54 yard return of blocked field goal (Matt Cummins kick), Drive: 14 plays, 48 yards, 4:56	28–0
2	7:18	Central Arkansas	Brandon Cox 37 yard pass from Hayden Hildebrand (Matt Cummins kick), Drive: 10 plays, 80 yards, 3:43	35–0
2	6:32	Central Arkansas	Devin Spurlock 2 yard fumble return (Matt Cummins kick), Drive: 2 plays, -18 yards, 0:41	42–0
2	3:34	Houston Baptist	Alec Chadwick 26 yard field goal, Drive: 8 plays, 68 yards, 2:54	42–3
3	9:09	Central Arkansas	Antwon Wells 2 yard run (Matt Cummins kick), Drive: 7 plays, 56 yards, 1:39	49–3
3	4:27	Houston Baptist	Alec Chadwick 32 yard field goal, Drive: 4 plays, -2 yards, 1:04	49–6
3	1:45	Central Arkansas	Keshawn Ledet 13 yard run (Matt Cummins kick), Drive: 7 plays, 75 yards, 2:42	56–6
4	6:47	Houston Baptist	David Racine 31 yard pass from Max Staver (Alec Chadwick kick), Drive: 5 plays, 44 yards, 1:17	56–13

=== Samford ===
Samford at Central Arkansas

Team	1	2	3	4	Total
• Bulldogs	7	21	7	0	35
Bears	3	7	0	19	29

- Date: September 10
- Location: Estes Stadium
  Conway, AR
- Game start: 6:00 PM CDT
- Elapsed time: 3:25
- Game attendance: 9,987
- Referee: Michael VanderVelde
- Television network: BNN

Scoring summary
1	6:06	Central Arkansas	Matt Cummins 35 yard field goal, Drive: 10 plays, 54 yards, 3:25	3–0
1	2:41	Samford	Karel Hamilton 29 yard pass from Devlin Hodges (Reece Everett kick), Drive: 9 plays, 78 yards, 3:20	3–7
2	7:48	Central Arkansas	Carlos Blackman 1 yard run (Matt Cummins kick), Drive: 5 plays, 64 yards, 1:14	10–7
2	4:39	Samford	Emmanuel Obajimi 33 yard pass from Devlin Hodges (Reece Everett kick), Drive: 4 plays, 76 yards, 1:03	10–14
2	3:13	Samford	Ahmad Gooden 28 yard fumble return (Reece Everett kick), Drive: 4 plays, 3 yards, 1:26	10–21
2	1:04	Samford	Kelvin McKnight 46 yard pass from Devlin Hodges (Reece Everett kick), Drive: 2 plays, 50 yards, 0:37	10–28
3	3:53	Samford	Tonne Osaigbovo 57 yard interception return (Reece Everett kick), Drive: 2 plays, 0 yards, 0:22	10–35
4	12:24	Central Arkansas	Antwon Wells 3 yard run (two-point pass conv. failed), Drive: 17 plays, 75 yards, 6:29	16–35
4	8:49	Central Arkansas	Antwon Wells 3 yard run (two-point run conv. failed), Drive: 8 plays, 85 yards, 2:07	22–35
4	2:11	Central Arkansas	Desmond Smith 18 yard pass from Hayden Hildebrand (Matt Cummins kick), Drive: 8 plays, 73 yards, 1:59	29–35

=== Northwestern State ===
Northwestern State at Central Arkansas

Team	1	2	3	4	Total
Demons	0	7	0	3	10
• Bears	0	14	10	0	24

- Date: September 17
- Location: Estes Stadium
  Conway, AR
- Game start: 6:00 PM CDT
- Elapsed time: 3:00
- Game attendance: 8,047
- Referee: Stephen Baron
- Television network: BNN

Scoring summary
2	14:11	Central Arkansas	Jatavious Wilson 49 yard pass from Hayden Hildebrand (Matt Cummins kick), Drive: 9 plays, 83 yards, 2:36	7–0
2	5:52	Central Arkansas	Desmond Smith 5 yard pass from Hayden Hildebrand (Matt Cummins kick), Drive: 14 plays, 64 yards, 5:45	14–0
2	4:46	Northwestern State	Shakeir Ryan 25 yard pass from Joel Blumenthal (Eric Piccione kick), Drive: 3 plays, 75 yards, 1:06	14–7
3	9:55	Central Arkansas	Hayden Hildebrand 12 yard run (Matt Cummins kick), Drive: 6 plays, 35 yards, 3:02	21–7
3	3:55	Central Arkansas	Matt Cummins 33 yard field goal, Drive: 9 plays, 38 yards, 3:38	24–7
4	14:55	Northwestern State	Eric Piccione 44 yard field goal, Drive: 8 plays, 36 yards, 3:32	24–10

=== @ Arkansas State ===
Central Arkansas at Arkansas State

Team	1	2	3	4	Total
• Bears	7	6	3	12	28
Red Wolves	16	0	7	0	23

- Date: September 24
- Location: Centennial Bank Stadium
  Jonesboro, AR
- Game start: 6:00 PM CDT
- Elapsed time: 3:33
- Game attendance: 28,012
- Game weather: 91 °F (33 °C) • Wind NE 3.5 mph (5.6 km/h) • Mostly sunny
- Referee: Jeff Hilyer
- Television network: ESPN3

Scoring summary
1	12:15	Arkansas State	J.D. Houston 33 yard field goal, Drive: 5 plays, 40 yards, 1:17	0–3
1	8:42	Central Arkansas	Tremon Smith 47 yard punt return (Matt Cummins kick), Drive: 3 plays, 4 yards, 1:23	7–3
1	8:02	Arkansas State	Kendall Sanders 5 yard pass from Justice Hansen (J.D. Houston kick failed), Drive: 3 plays, 48 yards, 0:39	7–9
1	3:21	Arkansas State	Warren Wand 48 yard pass from Justice Hansen (J.D. Houston kick), Drive: 4 plays, 67 yards, 1:26	7–16
2	1:44	Central Arkansas	Matt Cummins 29 yard field goal, Drive: 4 plays, 6 yards, 1:38	10–16
2	0:00	Central Arkansas	Matt Cummins 43 yard field goal, Drive: 6 plays, 31 yards, 0:32	13–16
3	6:06	Central Arkansas	Matt Cummins 25 yard field goal, Drive: 15 plays, 86 yards, 5:56	16–16
3	5:16	Arkansas State	Cameron Echols-Luper 58 yard pass from Justice Hansen (J.D. Houston kick), Drive: 3 plays, 70 yards, 0:44	16–23
4	13:12	Central Arkansas	Antwon Wells 3 yard run (Matt Cummins kick failed), Drive: 11 plays, 50 yards, 4:23	22–23
4	6:26	Central Arkansas	Brandon Cox 18 yard pass from Hayden Hildebrand (two-point pass conv. failed), Drive: 11 plays, 86 yards, 5:13	28–23

=== @ Abilene Christian ===
Central Arkansas at Abilene Christian

Team	1	2	3	4	Total
• Bears	9	28	14	7	58
Wildcats	7	6	7	7	27

- Date: October 1
- Location: Shotwell Stadium
  Abilene, TX
- Game start: 2:30 PM CDT
- Elapsed time: 3:27
- Game attendance: 4,215
- Game weather: 80 °F (27 °C) • Wind SSE 8 mph (13 km/h) • Sunny
- Referee: Vidal Jones
- Television network: ASN

Scoring summary
1	11:54	Central Arkansas	Team Safety, Drive: 2 plays, -1 yard, 0:29	2–0
1	7:05	Abilene Christian	De'Andre Brown 1 yard run (Nik Grau kick), Drive: 11 plays, 59 yards, 3:17	2–7
1	4:37	Central Arkansas	Jatavious Wilson 32 yard pass from Hayden Hildebrand (Matt Cummins kick), Drive: 6 plays, 57 yards, 2:23	9–7
2	14:48	Central Arkansas	Hayden Hildebrand 80 yard run (Matt Cummins kick), Drive: 3 plays, 81 yards, 1:09	16–7
2	9:53	Abilene Christian	Nik Grau 21 yard field goal, Drive: 8 plays, 47 yards, 2:08	16–10
2	6:12	Central Arkansas	Kelton Warren 1 yard run (Matt Cummins kick), Drive: 8 plays, 48 yards, 3:31	23–10
2	3:54	Abilene Christian	Nik Grau 34 yard field goal, Drive: 9 plays, 43 yards, 2:13	23–13
2	1:12	Central Arkansas	Keshawn Ledet 4 yard run (Matt Cummins kick), Drive: 6 plays, 75 yards, 2:42	30–13
2	0:53	Central Arkansas	George Odum 18 yard interception return (Matt Cummins kick), Drive: 3 plays, 7 yards, 0:19	37–13
3	8:20	Central Arkansas	Keshawn Ledet 7 yard run (Matt Cummins kick), Drive: 6 plays, 65 yards, 2:28	44–13
3	4:48	Abilene Christian	Tracy James 1 yard run (Nik Grau kick), Drive: 8 plays, 69 yards, 3:28	44–20
3	4:33	Central Arkansas	Dwayne Smith 93 yard kickoff return (Matt Cummins kick), Drive: 0 plays, 0 yards, 0:00	51–20
4	11:01	Central Arkansas	Jarvis Cooper 1 yard run (Matt Cummins kick), Drive: 14 plays, 84 yards, 7:00	58–20
4	7:01	Abilene Christian	Cody Ennis 2 yard pass from Parker McKenzie (Nik Grau kick), Drive: 11 plays, 75 yards, 4:00	58–27

=== @ McNeese State ===
Central Arkansas at McNeese State

Team	1	2	3	4	Total
• #23 Bears	7	7	14	7	35
Cowboys	0	0	0	0	0

- Date: October 15
- Location: Cowboy Stadium
  Lake Charles, LA
- Game start: 6:00 PM CDT
- Elapsed time: 3:06
- Game attendance: 9,253
- Game weather: 84 °F (29 °C) • Wind SSE 8 mph (13 km/h) • Partly cloudy, 62% humidity
- Referee: Cooper Castleberry
- Television network: ESPN3

Scoring summary
1	5:52	Central Arkansas	Kelton Warren 4 yard run (Matt Cummins kick), Drive: 6 plays, 38 yards, 2:15	7–0
2	7:57	Central Arkansas	Antwon Wells 10 yard run (Matt Cummins kick), Drive: 3 plays, 23 yards, 0:34	14–0
3	12:06	Central Arkansas	Antwon Wells 8 yard run (Matt Cummins kick), Drive: 7 plays, 74 yards, 2:54	21–0
3	9:20	Central Arkansas	Jatavio Wilson 33 yard pass from Hay Hildebrand (Matt Cummins kick), Drive: 3 plays, 38 yards, 0:48	28–0
4	8:01	Central Arkansas	Roman Gordon 83 yard pass from Hay Hildebrand (Matt Cummins kick), Drive: 3 plays, 87 yards, 1:32	35–0

=== Lamar (homecoming) ===
Lamar at Central Arkansas

Team	1	2	3	4	Total
Cardinals	3	3	0	6	12
• #20 Bears	0	10	9	3	22

- Date: October 22
- Location: Estes Stadium
  Conway, AR
- Game start: 6:00 PM CDT
- Elapsed time: 3:18
- Game attendance: 10,257
- Game weather: 71 °F (22 °C) • Wind SSW 5 mph (8.0 km/h) • Sunny
- Referee: Brad Van Vark
- Television network: ESPN3

Scoring summary
1	10:50	Lamar	Juan Carranco 30 yard field goal, Drive: 12 plays, 63 yards, 4:10	0–3
2	13:46	Central Arkansas	Keshawn Ledet 7 yard run (Matt Cummins kick), Drive: 3 plays, 19 yards, 0:55	7–3
2	8:00	Central Arkansas	Matt Cummins 19 yard field goal, Drive: 8 plays, 54 yards, 3:46	10–3
2	1:41	Lamar	Juan Carranco 26 yard field goal, Drive: 10 plays, 25 yards, 3:27	10–6
3	10:29	Central Arkansas	Team 1 yard safety	12–6
3	9:15	Central Arkansas	Kelton Warren 20 yard pass from Hay Hildebrand (Matt Cummins kick), Drive: 4 plays, 56 yards, 1:12	19–6
4	9:51	Central Arkansas	Matt Cummins 38 yard field goal, Drive: 8 plays, 54 yards, 3:19	22–6
4	5:28	Lamar	Andrew Allen 2 yard run (two-point pass conv. failed), Drive: 12 plays, 56 yards, 4:19	22–12

=== @ Southeastern Louisiana ===
Central Arkansas at Southeastern Louisiana

Team	1	2	3	4	Total
• #19 Bears	0	24	14	7	45
Lions	0	3	7	0	10

- Date: October 29
- Location: Strawberry Stadium
  Hammond, LA
- Game start: 7:00 PM CDT
- Elapsed time: 3:08
- Game attendance: 4,241
- Game weather: 86 °F (30 °C) • Wind ENE 3 mph (4.8 km/h) • Clear
- Referee: Ross Smith
- Television network: ESPN3

Scoring summary
2	13:16	Central Arkansas	Hayden Hildebrand 4 yard run (Matt Cummins kick), Drive: 12 plays, 69 yards, 3:57	7–0
2	9:54	Central Arkansas	Matt Cummins 47 yard field goal, Drive: 5 plays, 21 yards, 2:27	10–0
2	8:56	Central Arkansas	Tyler Williams 32 yard interception return (Matt Cummins kick), Drive: 3 plays, 0 yards, 0:58	17–0
2	5:13	Southeastern Louisiana	Jonathon Tatum 31 yard field goal, Drive: 11 plays, 61 yards, 3:43	17–3
2	0:11	Central Arkansas	Cody Dauksch 7 yard pass from Hayden Hildebrand (Matt Cummins kick), Drive: 7 plays, 38 yards, 1:03	24–3
3	8:14	Central Arkansas	Scott Matiaha 6 yard pass from Hayden Hildebrand (Matt Cummins kick), Drive: 14 plays, 69 yards, 6:36	31–3
3	4:51	Central Arkansas	Desmond Smith 7 yard pass from Hayden Hildebrand (Matt Cummins kick), Drive: 7 plays, 47 yards, 1:42	38–3
3	1:09	Southeastern Louisiana	Jacorey Fuller 25 yard return of blocked punt (Jonathon Tatum kick), Drive: 3 plays, 8 yards, 1:31	38–10
4	11:15	Central Arkansas	Jakari Dillard 0 yard fumble recovery (Matt Cummins kick), Drive: 5 plays, 54 yards, 2:49	45–10

=== @ Stephen F. Austin ===
Central Arkansas at Stephen F. Austin

Team	1	2	3	4	Total
• #17 Bears	14	10	0	10	34
Lumberjacks	7	7	0	0	14

- Date: November 5
- Location: Homer Bryce Stadium
  Nacogdoches, TX
- Game start: 3:00 PM CST
- Elapsed time: 3:23
- Game attendance: 10,188
- Game weather: About 60 °F (16 °C) • Cloudy
- Referee: Michael VanderVelde
- Television network: ASN

Scoring summary
1	10:54	Stephen F. Austin	Zach Conque 8 yard run (Storm Ruiz kick), Drive: 2 plays, 9 yards, 0:34	0–7
1	5:42	Central Arkansas	Cody Dauksch 30 yard pass from Hayden Hildebrand (Matt Cummins kick), Drive: 5 plays, 55 yards, 2:10	7–7
1	2:11	Central Arkansas	Desmond Smith 57 yard pass from Hayden Hildebrand (Matt Cummins kick), Drive: 5 plays, 72 yards, 1:45	14–7
2	14:56	Stephen F. Austin	Zach Conque 6 yard run (Storm Ruiz kick), Drive: 7 plays, 81 yards, 2:09	14–14
2	11:02	Central Arkansas	Carlos Blackman 1 yard run (Matt Cummins kick), Drive: 11 plays, 75 yards, 3:48	21–14
2	0:21	Central Arkansas	Matt Cummins 31 yard field goal, Drive: 12 plays, 40 yards, 4:03	24–14
4	10:20	Central Arkansas	Antwon Wells 1 yard run (Matt Cummins kick), Drive: 2 plays, 9 yards, 0:24	31–14
4	3:53	Central Arkansas	Matt Cummins 22 yard field goal, Drive: 4 plays, 5 yards, 2:06	34–14

=== Nicholls ===
Nicholls at Central Arkansas

Team	1	2	3	4	Total
Colonels	0	7	7	10	24
• #13 Bears	0	10	7	14	31

- Date: November 12
- Location: Estes Stadium
  Conway, AR
- Game start: 3:00 PM CST
- Elapsed time: 3:41
- Game attendance: 5,785
- Referee: Cooper Castleberry
- Television network: ASN

Scoring summary
2	7:51	Central Arkansas	Matt Cummins 32 yard field goal, Drive: 5 plays, 54 yards, 2:35	3–0
2	4:44	Nicholls	C.J. Bates 45 yard pass from Chase Fourcade (David McKey kick), Drive: 9 plays, 75 yards, 3:07	3–7
2	0:30	Central Arkansas	Antwon Wells 1 yard run (Matt Cummins kick), Drive: 7 plays, 37 yards, 2:05	10–7
3	11:15	Nicholls	Kyran Irvin 1 yard run (David McKey kick), Drive: 9 plays, 75 yards, 3:45	10–14
3	2:09	Central Arkansas	Carlo Blackman 1 yard run (Matt Cummins kick), Drive: 7 plays, 58 yards, 2:01	17–14
4	11:42	Nicholls	C.J. Bates 80 yard pass from Chase Fourcade (David McKey kick), Drive: 1 plays, 80 yards, 0:14	17–21
4	11:16	Central Arkansas	Carlo Blackman 15 yard run (Matt Cummins kick), Drive: 2 plays, 49 yards, 0:17	24–21
4	8:15	Central Arkansas	Jaylon Lofton 79 yard interception (Matt Cummins kick), Drive: 8 plays, 69 yards, 2:56	31–21
4	5:09	Nicholls	David McKey 46 yard field goal, Drive: 11 plays, 52 yards, 3:00	31–24

=== @ Sam Houston State ===
Central Arkansas at Sam Houston State

Team	1	2	3	4	Total
#11 Bears	0	10	6	7	23
• #1 Bearkats	17	21	14	7	59

- Date: November 19
- Location: Bowers Stadium
  Huntsville, TX
- Game start: 2:30 PM CST
- Elapsed time: 3:42
- Game attendance: 9,182
- Game weather: 61 °F (16 °C) • Wind N 7 mph (11 km/h) • Sunny and clear
- Referee: Brad Van Vark
- Television network: ESPN3

Scoring summary
1	12:23	Sam Houston State	Parker Murry 2 yard pass from Jeremiah Briscoe (Luc Swimberghe kick), Drive: 7 plays, 75 yards, 2:37	0–7
1	6:42	Sam Houston State	Luc Swimberghe 23 yard field goal, Drive: 13 plays, 78 yards, 3:42	0–10
1	4:11	Sam Houston State	Collin Rison 3 yard pass from Jeremiah Briscoe (Luc Swimberghe kick), Drive: 7 plays, 39 yards, 2:02	0–17
2	11:21	Central Arkansas	Desmond Smith 14 yard pass from Hayden Hildebrand (Matt Cummins kick), Drive: 13 plays, 70 yards, 4:00	7–17
2	8:11	Sam Houston State	Yedidiah Louis 40 yard pass from Jeremiah Briscoe (Luc Swimberghe kick), Drive: 3 plays, 43 yards, 0:28	7–24
2	4:00	Sam Houston State	Yedidiah Louis 21 yard pass from Jeremiah Briscoe (Luc Swimberghe kick), Drive: 3 plays, 34 yards, 0:42	7–31
2	1:46	Sam Houston State	Jaylen Harris 55 yard pass from Jeremiah Briscoe (Luc Swimberghe kick), Drive: 2 plays, 61 yards, 0:13	7–38
2	0:05	Central Arkansas	Matt Cummins 33 yard field goal, Drive: 10 plays, 40 yards, 1:32	10–38
3	10:24	Sam Houston State	Yedidiah Louis 46 yard pass from Jeremiah Briscoe (Luc Swimberghe kick), Drive: 1 play, 46 yards, 0:10	10–45
3	6:24	Central Arkansas	Jarvis Cooper 1 yard run (Matt Cummins kick failed), Drive: 12 plays, 75 yards, 4:00	16–45
3	3:24	Sam Houston State	Yedidiah Louis 10 yard pass from Jeremiah Briscoe (Luc Swimberghe kick), Drive: 1 play, 10 yards, 0:05	16–52
4	11:45	Sam Houston State	Remus Bulmer 17 yard run (Luc Swimberghe kick), Drive: 11 plays, 75 yards, 4:31	16–59
4	0:19	Central Arkansas	Chandler Dexter 10 yard pass from Hayden Hildebrand (Matt Cummins kick), Drive: 9 plays, 65 yards, 2:16	23–59

== FCS Playoffs ==
=== First Round–Illinois State ===
Illinois State at Central Arkansas

Team	1	2	3	4	Total
Redbirds	10	7	0	7	24
• #14 Bears	0	7	0	24	31

- Date: November 26
- Location: Estes Stadium
  Conway, AR
- Game start: 2:00 PM CST
- Elapsed time: 3:10
- Game attendance: 3,165
- Game weather: 49 °F (9 °C) • Wind SW 3 mph (4.8 km/h) • Overcast
- Referee: J. Crowley
- Television network: ESPN3

Scoring summary
1	11:35	Illinois State	DeMarco Corbin 31 yard run (Sean Slattery kick), Drive: 6 plays, 56 yards, 2:34	0–7
1	6:05	Illinois State	Sean Slattery 43 yard field goal, Drive: 8 plays, 29 yards, 4:29	0–10
2	9:51	Central Arkansas	Desmond Smith 1 yard pass from Hay Hildebrand (Matt Cummins kick), Drive: 12 plays, 57 yards, 4:02	7–10
2	5:45	Illinois State	Anthony Warrum 4 yard pass from Jake Kolbe (Sean Slattery kick), Drive: 7 plays, 48 yards, 3:56	7–17
4	14:06	Central Arkansas	Jakari Dillard 4 yard return of blocked punt (Matt Cummins kick), Drive: 3 plays, 2 yards, 1:13	14–17
4	9:51	Central Arkansas	Desmond Smith 2 yard pass from Hayden Hildebrand (Matt Cummins kick), Drive: 8 plays, 83 yards, 2:51	21–17
4	8:04	Central Arkansas	Matt Cummins 28 yard field goal, Drive: 5 plays, 25 yards, 1:43	24–17
4	6:22	Illinois State	Anthony Warrum 55 yard pass from Jake Kolbe (Sean Slattery kick), Drive: 4 plays, 81 yards, 1:38	24–24
4	1:28	Central Arkansas	Antwon Wells 4 yard run (Matt Cummins kick), Drive: 2 plays, 43 yards, 0:43	31–24

=== Second Round–Eastern Washington ===
Central Arkansas at Eastern Washington

Team	1	2	3	4	Total
#14 Bears	0	14	0	0	14
• #3 Eagles	0	21	3	7	31

- Date: December 3
- Location: Roos Field
  Cheney, WA
- Game start: 2:00 PM CST
- Elapsed time: 3:31
- Game attendance: 6,085
- Game weather: 41 °F (5 °C) • Wind SW 16 mph (26 km/h) • Cloudy
- Referee: Drew Myers
- Television network: ESPN3

Scoring summary
2	14:28	Central Arkansas	Carlos Blackman 4 yard run (Matt Cummins kick), Drive: 13 plays, 71 yards, 4:37	7–0
2	9:49	Central Arkansas	Antwon Wells 2 yard run (Matt Cummins kick), Drive: 5 plays, 47 yards, 1:42	14–0
2	4:47	Eastern Washington	Gage Gubrud 1 yard run (Roldan Alcobendas kick), Drive: 12 plays, 95 yards, 5:02	14–7
2	3:48	Eastern Washington	Cooper Kupp 19 yard pass from Gage Gubrud (Roldan Alcobendas kick), Drive: 3 plays, 22 yards, 0:59	14–14
2	0:14	Eastern Washington	Cooper Kupp 6 yard pass from Gage Gubrud (Roldan Alcobendas kick), Drive: 11 plays, 59 yards, 1:33	14–21
3	0:25	Eastern Washington	Roldan Alcobendas 20 yard field goal, Drive: 13 plays, 73 yards, 4:27	14–24
4	1:18	Eastern Washington	Shaq Hill 2 yard run (Roldan Alcobendas kick), Drive: 9 plays, 51 yards, 4:05	14–31

== Ranking movements ==
Ranking movements Legend: ██ Increase in ranking ██ Decrease in ranking — = Not ranked RV = Received votes т = Tied with team above or below
	Week													
Poll	Pre	1	2	3	4	5	6	7	8	9	10	11	12	Final
STATS FCS	RV	RV	RV	RV	RV	25	23	20	19	17	13	11	14	14
Coaches	—	RV	—	—	RV	24	22	18–T	18	17	13	12	16	16
FCS Playoffs	Not released									10	9	7	Not released	
