= 2016 Stephen F. Austin Lumberjacks football team =

American college football season

2016 Stephen F. Austin Lumberjacks football
- Conference: Southland Conference
- Record: 5–6 (4–5 Southland)
- Head coach: Clint Conque (3rd season)
- Offensive coordinator: Gary Crowton (1st season)
- Defensive coordinator: Matt Williamson (3rd season)
- Home stadium: Homer Bryce Stadium

2016 Southland Conference football standings
	Conf.			Overall
Team	W		L	W		L
No. 5 Sam Houston State $^	9	–	0	12	–	1
No. 14 Central Arkansas ^	8	–	1	10	–	3
SE Louisiana	7	–	2	7	–	4
McNeese State	5	–	4	6	–	5
Nicholls State	5	–	4	5	–	6
Stephen F. Austin	4	–	5	5	–	6
Houston Baptist	3	–	5	4	–	7
Incarnate Word *	3	–	6	3	–	8
Lamar	3	–	6	3	–	8
Abilene Christian *	2	–	7	2	–	9
Northwestern State	0	–	9	1	–	10
$ – Conference champion; ^ – FCS playoff participant; * – ineligible for FCS playoffs due to transition from NCAA Division II; Rankings from STATS poll

The 2016 Stephen F. Austin Lumberjacks football team represented Stephen F. Austin State University in the 2016 NCAA Division I FCS football season. The Lumberjacks were led by third-year head coach Clint Conque and played their home games at Homer Bryce Stadium. They were members of the Southland Conference. They finished the season 5–6, 4–5 in Southland play to finish in sixth place.

== Schedule ==
Date	Time	Opponent	Site	TV	Result	Attendance
September 3	7:00 pm	at Texas Tech*	Jones AT&T Stadium; Lubbock, TX	FSN	L 17–69	60,454
September 10	6:30 pm	West Alabama*	Homer Bryce Stadium; Nacogdoches, TX	ESPN3	W 30–24	5,812
September 17	6:00 pm	at No. 14 McNeese State	Cowboy Stadium; Lake Charles, LA	ASN	W 31–28	11,742
September 24	6:00 pm	Abilene Christian	Homer Bryce Stadium; Nacogdoches, TX	ESPN3	W 41–30	8,516
October 1	3:00 pm	vs. No. 2 Sam Houston State	NRG Stadium; Houston, TX (Battle of the Piney Woods)	ESPN3	L 28–63	27,411
October 8	2:30 pm	at Nicholls State	Manning Field at John L. Guidry Stadium; Thibodaux, LA	ASN	L 28–35 ^{2OT}	9,002
October 15	3:00 pm	Southeastern Louisiana	Homer Bryce Stadium; Nacogdoches, TX	ESPN3	L 34–58	8,314
October 29	6:00 pm	at Incarnate Word	Gayle and Tom Benson Stadium; San Antonio, TX	UIWtv	W 42–19	2,811
November 5	3:00 pm	No. 17 Central Arkansas	Homer Bryce Stadium; Nacogdoches, TX	ASN	L 14–34	10,188
November 12	2:00 pm	at Houston Baptist	Husky Stadium; Houston, TX	ESPN3	L 24–31	3,026
November 19	3:00 pm	Northwestern State	Homer Bryce Stadium; Nacogdoches, TX (Chief Caddo)	ESPN3	W 45–31	7,539
*Non-conference game; Rankings from STATS Poll released prior to the game; All times are in Central time

== Game summaries ==
=== @ Texas Tech ===
Stephen F. Austin at Texas Tech

Team	1	2	3	4	Total
Lumberjacks	0	3	7	7	17
• Red Raiders	21	24	10	14	69

- Date: September 3
- Location: Jones AT&T Stadium
  Lubbock, TX
- Game start: 7:00 PM CDT
- Elapsed time: 4:00
- Game attendance: 60,097
- Game weather: 83°F • S 16 • Partly cloudy
- Referee: Cal McNeill
- Television network: FSN

Scoring summary
1	12:22	Texas Tech	Cameron Batson 13 yard pass from Patrick Mahomes II (Clayton Hatfield kick), Drive: 10 plays, 75 yards, 2:38	0–7
1	6:03	Texas Tech	Keke Coutee 6 yard run (Clayton Hatfield kick), Drive: 5 plays, 45 yards, 1:12	0–14
1	1:10	Texas Tech	Patrick Mahomes II 3 yard run (Clayton Hatfield kick), Drive: 8 plays, 69 yards, 2:46	0–21
2	13:12	Texas Tech	Patrick Mahomes II 7 yard run (Clayton Hatfield kick), Drive: 6 plays, 78 yards, 1:40	0–28
2	12:15	Texas Tech	Jonathan Giles 22 yard pass from Patrick Mahomes II (Clayton Hatfield kick), Drive: 1 play, 22 yards, 0:08	0–35
2	9:24	Stephen F. Austin	Storm Ruiz 43 yard field goal, Drive: 11 plays, 49 yards, 2:51	3–35
2	4:33	Texas Tech	Dylan Cantrell 8 yard pass from Patrick Mahomes (Clayton Hatfield kick), Drive: 4 plays, 93 yards, 1:20	3–42
2	0:17	Texas Tech	Clayton Hatfield 31 yard field goal, Drive: 10 plays, 86 yards, 4:16	3–45
3	7:50	Texas Tech	Devin Laurendale 14 yard pass from Patrick Mahomes II (Clayton Hatfield kick), Drive: 10 plays, 80 yards, 2:43	3–52
3	2:42	Stephen F. Austin	Justice Liggins 9 yard pass from Zach Conque (Storm Ruiz kick), Drive: 10 plays, 84 yards, 2:53	10–52
3	1:08	Texas Tech	Clayton Hatfield 43 yard field goal, Drive: 9 plays, 55 yards, 1:34	10–55
4	12:11	Stephen F. Austin	Tamrick Pace 38 yard pass from Hunter Taylor (Storm Ruiz kick), Drive: 5 plays, 75 yards, 1:38	17–55
4	3:25	Texas Tech	Ja'Deion High 9 yard pass from Nic Shimonek (Clayton Hatfield kick), Drive: 12 plays, 70 yards, 3:31	17–62
4	1:10	Texas Tech	Corey Dauphine 27 yard run (Clayton Hatfield kick), Drive: 1 play, 27 yards, 0:18	17–69

=== West Alabama ===
West Alabama at Stephen F. Austin

Team	1	2	3	4	Total
Tigers	7	7	3	7	24
• Lumberjacks	10	10	10	0	30

- Date: September 10
- Location: Homer Bryce Stadium
  Nacogdoches, TX
- Game start: 6:30 PM CDT
- Elapsed time: 3:28
- Game attendance: 5,812
- Referee: Cal McNeill
- Television network: ESPN3

Scoring summary
1	9:41	West Alabama	Lakenderic Thomas 5 yard run (Reed James kick), Drive: 6 plays, 38 yards, 1:40	0–7
1	7:56	Stephen F. Austin	Storm Ruiz 44 yard field goal, Drive: 7 plays, 59 yards, 1:41	3–7
1	4:05	Stephen F. Austin	Loren Easly 5 yard run (Storm Ruiz kick), Drive: 8 plays, 66 yards, 2:59	10–7
2	14:29	Stephen F. Austin	Storm Ruiz 32 yard field goal, Drive: 16 plays, 60 yards, 3:06	13–7
2	6:48	Stephen F. Austin	Zach Conque 4 yard run (Storm Ruiz kick), Drive: 10 plays, 64 yards, 3:24	20–7
2	2:18	West Alabama	Austin Grammer 3 yard run (Reed James kick), Drive: 9 plays, 78 yards, 2:22	20–14
3	9:36	Stephen F. Austin	Storm Ruiz 30 yard field goal, Drive: 4 plays, 8 yards, 1:02	23–14
3	4:56	West Alabama	Jordan Bennett 48 yard field goal, Drive: 12 plays, 49 yards, 4:34	23–17
3	2:45	Stephen F. Austin	Trae Hart 75 yard punt return (Storm Ruiz kick), Drive: 1 play, 75 yards, 0:00	30–17
4	6:21	West Alabama	Tray Fletcher 7 yard pass from Harry Satterwhite (Reed James kick), Drive: 5 plays, 40 yards, 1:33	30–24

=== @ McNeese State ===
Stephen F. Austin at McNeese State

Team	1	2	3	4	Total
• Lumberjacks	10	7	7	7	31
#14 Cowboys	7	7	7	7	28

- Date: September 17
- Location: Cowboy Stadium
  Lake Charles, LA
- Game start: 6:00 PM CDT
- Elapsed time: 3:50
- Game attendance: 11,742
- Game weather: 82°F • E 1 • Partly cloudy
- Referee: Ross Smith
- Television network: ASN

Scoring summary
1	12:11	Stephen F. Austin	Zach Conque 36 yard run (Storm Ruiz kick), Drive: 7 plays, 67 yards, 1:54	7–0
1	7:44	Stephen F. Austin	Storm Ruiz 40 yard field goal, Drive: 6 plays, 59 yards, 1:45	10–0
1	5:11	McNeese State	Darious Crawley 60 yard pass from James Tabary (Trent Manuel kick), Drive: 5 plays, 77 yards, 2:33	10–7
2	13:28	Stephen F. Austin	Trae Hart 30 yard pass from Zach Conque (Storm Ruiz kick), Drive: 3 plays, 31 yards, 0:42	17–7
2	5:17	McNeese State	Kent Shelby 44 yard pass from James Tabary (Trent Manuel kick), Drive: 4 plays, 74 yards, 1:44	17–14
3	7:25	McNeese State	Kent Shelby 5 yard pass from James Tabary (Gunnar Raborn kick), Drive: 5 plays, 50 yards, 2:19	17–21
3	6:17	Stephen F. Austin	De'Quann Ruffin 58 yard pass from Zach Conque (Storm Ruiz kick), Drive: 3 plays, 68 yards, 1:08	24–21
4	14:56	McNeese State	Darious Crawley 10 yard pass from James Tabary (Gunnar Raborn kick), Drive: 7 plays, 52 yards, 2:04	24–28
4	3:35	Stephen F. Austin	Tamrick Pace 4 yard pass from Hunter Taylor (Storm Ruiz kick), Drive: 5 plays, 42 yards, 1:27	31–28

=== Abilene Christian ===
Abilene Christian at Stephen F. Austin

Team	1	2	3	4	Total
Wildcats	0	7	15	8	30
• Lumberjacks	14	14	10	3	41

- Date: September 24
- Location: Homer Bryce Stadium
  Nacogdocnes, TX
- Game start: 6:00 PM CDT
- Elapsed time: 4:06
- Game attendance: 8,516
- Game weather: Upper 80s • SSE 6–10 • Parly cloudy, hot
- Referee: Mike Defee
- Television network: ESPN3

Scoring summary
1	1:44	Stephen F. Austin	Nick Jones 37 yard pass from Hunter Taylor (Storm Ruiz kick), Drive: 7 plays, 65 yards, 1:52	7–0
1	0:54	Stephen F. Austin	Tamrick Pace 3 yard pass from Hunter Taylor (Storm Ruiz kick), Drive: 2 plays, 5 yards, 0:38	14–0
2	6:49	Stephen F. Austin	Nick Jones 7 yard pass from Hunter Taylor (Storm Ruiz kick), Drive: 13 plays, 88 yards, 4:00	21–0
2	1:45	Stephen F. Austin	Zach Conque 3 yard run (Storm Ruiz kick), Drive: 8 plays, 80 yards, 2:49	28–0
2	0:22	Abilene Christian	Troy Grant 30 yard pass from Dallas Sealey (Nik Grau kick), Drive: 8 plays, 81 yards, 1:15	28–7
3	7:07	Stephen F. Austin	Storm Ruiz 25 yard field goal, Drive: 4 plays, 3 yards, 1:13	31–7
3	4:00	Stephen F. Austin	Kiki Hill 18 yard pass from Hunter Taylor (Storm Ruiz kick), Drive: 2 plays, 57 yards, 0:21	38–7
3	3:45	Abilene Christian	Justin Miller 93 yard kickoff return (Nik Grau kick)	38–14
3	1:08	Abilene Christian	De'Andre Brown 55 yard pass from Dallas Sealey (Dallas Sealey pass to Adrian Duncan for two-point conv.), Drive: 1 play, 55 yards, 0:11	38–22
4	7:30	Abilene Christian	Troy Grant 6 yard pass from Dallas Sealey (Justin Miller run for two-point conv.), Drive: 14 plays, 80 yards, 4:26	38–30
4	5:17	Stephen F. Austin	Storm Ruiz 20 yard field goal, Drive: 7 plays, 61 yards, 2:08	41–30

=== Sam Houston State ===
Battle of the Piney Woods

Team	1	2	3	4	Total
• #2 Bearkats	28	14	21	0	63
Lumberjacks	0	7	14	7	28

- Date: October 1
- Location: NRG Stadium
  Houston, TX
- Game start: 3:00 PM CDT
- Elapsed time: 3:35
- Game attendance: 27,411
- Game weather: Indoors • 79°F outside • Calm
- Referee: Michael VanderVelde
- Television network: ESPN3

Scoring summary
1	9:20	Sam Houston State	Yedidiah Louis 37 yard pass from Jeremiah Briscoe (Luc Swimberghe kick), Drive: 4 plays, 53 yards, 0:44	0–7
1	6:48	Sam Houston State	Davion Davis 57 yard pass from Jeremiah Briscoe (Luc Swimberghe kick), Drive: 2 plays, 57 yards, 0:40	0–14
1	5:28	Sam Houston State	Corey Avery 7 yard run (Luc Swimberghe kick), Drive: 3 plays, 18 yards, 1:16	0–21
1	2:39	Sam Houston State	Nathan Stewart 73 yard pass from Jeremiah Briscoe (Luc Swimberghe kick), Drive: 2 plays, 79 yards, 0:39	0–28
2	12:13	Sam Houston State	Nathan Stewart 39 yard pass from Jeremiah Briscoe (Luc Swimberghe kick), Drive: 5 plays, 50 yards, 2:00	0–35
2	10:23	Stephen F. Austin	Jabralon Allen 18 yard pass from Zach Conque (Storm Ruiz kick), Drive: 8 plays, 70 yards, 1:50	7–35
2	7:29	Sam Houston State	Yedidiah Louis 17 yard pass from Jeremiah Briscoe (Luc Swimberghe kick), Drive: 8 plays, 68 yards, 2:54	7–42
3	12:05	Stephen F. Austin	Justice Liggins 1 yard pass from Zach Conque (Storm Ruiz kick), Drive: 10 plays, 75 yards, 2:55	14–42
3	10:22	Sam Houston State	Collin Rison 16 yard pass from Jeremiah Briscoe (Luc Swimberghe kick), Drive: 4 plays, 64 yards, 1:43	14–49
3	7:56	Sam Houston State	Corey Avery 21 yard run (Luc Swimberghe kick), Drive: 5 plays, 69 yards, 1:42	14–56
3	6:45	Stephen F. Austin	Tamrick Pace 34 yard pass from Hunter Taylor (Storm Ruiz kick), Drive: 6 plays, 75 yards, 1:11	21–56
3	1:55	Sam Houston State	Deon Hutchinson 2 yard pass from Jeremiah Briscoe (Luc Swimberghe kick), Drive: 10 plays, 73 yards, 4:50	21–63
4	7:53	Stephen F. Austin	Loren Easly 7 yard run (Storm Ruiz kick), Drive: 13 plays, 57 yards, 3:54	28–63

=== @ Nicholls ===
Stephen F. Austin at Nicholls

Team	1	2	3	4	OT	2OT	Total
Lumberjacks	14	0	7	0	7	0	28
• Colonels	0	14	7	0	7	7	35

- Date: October 8
- Location: John L. Guidry Stadium
  Thibodaux, LA
- Game start: 3:00 PM CDT
- Elapsed time: 3:52
- Game attendance: 9,002
- Game weather: 85°F • NNW 11 • Sunny
- Referee: Ross Smith
- Television network: ASN

Scoring summary
1	13:45	Stephen F. Austin	Joshawa West 30 yard pass from Zach Conque (Storm Ruiz kick), Drive: 4 plays, 65 yards, 1:15	0–7
1	12:15	Stephen F. Austin	Zach Conque 1 yard run (Storm Ruiz kick), Drive: 4 plays, 32 yards, 1:11	0–14
2	7:52	Nicholls	C.J. Okpalobi 1 yard run (David McKey kick), Drive: 9 plays, 85 yards, 3:37	14–7
2	0:54	Nicholls	Chase Fourcade 14 yard run (David McKey kick), Drive: 3 plays, 18 yards, 0:44	14–14
3	7:31	Nicholls	C.J. Okpalobi 36 yard pass from Chase Fourcade (David McKey kick), Drive: 9 plays, 80 yards, 3:39	14–21
3	3:34	Stephen F. Austin	Tamrick Pace 49 yard pass from Zach Conque (Storm Ruiz kick), Drive: 3 plays, 59 yards, 0:29	21–21
OT	15:00	Stephen F. Austin	Zach Conque 1 yard run (Storm Ruiz kick), Drive: 9 plays, 0 yards, 0:38	28–21
OT	15:00	Nicholls	Damion Jeanpiere 25 yard pass from Chase Fourcade (David McKey kick), Drive: 1 play, 25 yards, 0:00	28–28
2OT	15:00	Nicholls	Chase Fourcade 1 yard run (David McKey kick), Drive: 9 plays, 25 yards, 0:00	28–35

=== Southeastern Louisiana ===
Stephen F. Austin at Southeastern Louisiana

Team	1	2	3	4	Total
• Lions	10	20	7	21	58
Lumberjacks	3	14	17	0	34

- Date: October 15
- Location: Homer Bryce Stadium
  Nacogdoches, TX
- Game start: 6:30 PM CDT
- Elapsed time: 3:58
- Game attendance: 8,314
- Game weather: Mid 80s • Partly cloudy, warm
- Referee: Michael VanderVelde
- Television network: ESPN3

Scoring summary
1	11:21	Southeastern Louisiana	Jonathan Tatum 33 yard field goal, Drive: 9 plays, 61 yards, 3:47	0–3
1	8:48	Stephen F. Austin	Storm Ruiz 37 yard field goal, Drive: 8 plays, 31 yards, 1:52	3–3
1	6:22	Southeastern Louisiana	Brandon Acker 19 yard pass from Justin Alo (Jonathan Tatum kick), Drive: 5 plays, 53 yards, 2:17	3–10
2	13:46	Southeastern Louisiana	Juwan Dickey 10 yard pass from Justin Alo (Jonathan Tatum kick), Drive: 4 plays, 80 yards, 1:05	3–17
2	12:31	Stephen F. Austin	Loren Easly 61 yard run (Storm Ruiz kick), Drive: 4 plays, 76 yards, 1:06	10–17
2	7:21	Southeastern Louisiana	Juwan Dickey 27 yard pass from Justin Alo (Jonathan Tatum kick blocked), Drive: 7 plays, 63 yards, 2:39	10–23
2	1:55	Southeastern Louisiana	Julius Maracalin 2 yard run (Jonathan Tatum kick), Drive: 8 plays, 58 yards, 3:30	10–30
2	0:52	Stephen F. Austin	George Stone 50 yard interception (Storm Ruiz kick)	17–30
3	12:20	Stephen F. Austin	Loren Easly 2 yard run (Storm Ruiz kick), Drive: 11 plays, 83 yards, 2:45	24–30
3	9:18	Southeastern Louisiana	Kaelyn Henderson 45 yard run (Jonathan Tatum kick), Drive: 1 plays, 45 yards, 0:04	24–37
3	5:10	Stephen F. Austin	Storm Ruiz 29 yard field goal, Drive: 6 plays, 17 yards, 2:02	27–37
3	3:28	Stephen F. Austin	Loren Easly 74 yard run (Storm Ruiz kick), Drive: 2 plays, 90 yards, 0:38	37–34
4	7:17	Southeastern Louisiana	Courtney Rutledge 72 yard blocked field goal return (Jonathan Tatum kick)	34–44
4	6:06	Southeastern Louisiana	Jacory Fuller 41 yard interception (Jonathan Tatum kick)	34–51
4	0:39	Southeastern Louisiana	Jacq'co Price 35 yard pass from D'Shaie Landor (Jonathan Tatum kick), Drive: 4 plays, 38 yards, 1:21	34–58

=== @ Incarnate Word ===
Stephen F. Austin at Incarnate Word

Team	1	2	3	4	Total
• Lumberjacks	0	14	14	14	42
Cardinals	3	0	3	13	19

- Date: October 29
- Location: Gayle and Tom Benson Stadium
  San Antonio, TX
- Game start: 6:00 PM CDT
- Elapsed time: 3:19
- Game attendance: 2,811
- Game weather: 82°F • SE 5 • Warm and Clear
- Referee: Kevin Hassell
- Television network: UIWtv
Sources: Box Score

Scoring summary
1	10:10	Incarnate Word	Cody Seidel 24 yard field goal, Drive: 4 plays, 8 yards, 1:31	0–3
2	12:18	Stephen F. Austin	Zach Conque 4 yard run (Storm Ruiz kick), Drive: 3 plays, 3 yards, 0:49	7–3
2	4:15	Stephen F. Austin	Zach Conque 6 yard run (Storm Ruiz kick), Drive: 7 plays, 54 yards, 1:55	14–3
3	8:09	Incarnate Word	Cody Seidel 19 yard field goal, Drive: 6 plays, 32 yards, 3:09	14–6
3	6:52	Stephen F. Austin	Zach Conque 17 yard run (Storm Ruiz kick), Drive: 4 plays, 34 yards, 1:05	21–6
3	4:57	Stephen F. Austin	De'Quann Ruffin 32 yard pass from Zach Conque (Storm Ruiz kick), Drive: 1 play, 32 yards, 0:08	28–6
4	12:41	Incarnate Word	Junior Sessions 1 yard run (two-point pass conv. failed), Drive: 9 plays, 85 yards, 2:41	28–12
4	11:33	Stephen F. Austin	Trae Hart 53 yard pass from Zach Conque (Storm Ruiz kick), Drive: 4 plays, 71 yards, 1:03	35–12
4	9:54	Stephen F. Austin	Tamrick Pace 40 yard pass from Zach Conque (Storm Ruiz kick), Drive: 2 plays, 44 yards, 0:40	42–12
4	2:31	Incarnate Word	Jordan Hicks 11 yard pass from Taylor Laird (Cody Seidel kick), Drive: 8 plays, 65 yards, 2:21	42–19

=== Central Arkansas ===
Central Arkansas at Stephen F. Austin

Team	1	2	3	4	Total
• #17 Bears	14	10	0	10	34
Lumberjacks	7	7	0	0	14

- Date: November 5
- Location: Homer Bryce Stadium
  Nacogdoches, TX
- Game start: 3:00 PM CST
- Elapsed time: 3:23
- Game attendance: 10,188
- Game weather: Upper 60s • Cloudy, pleasant
- Referee: Michael VanderVelde
- Television network: ASN

Scoring summary
1	10:54	Stephen F. Austin	Zach Conque 8 yard run (Storm Ruiz kick), Drive: 2 plays, 9 yards, 0:34	7–0
1	5:42	Central Arkansas	Cody Dauksch 30 yard pass from Hayden Hildebrand (Matt Cummins kick), Drive: 5 plays, 55 yards, 2:10	7–7
1	2:11	Central Arkansas	Desmond Smith 57 yard pass from Hayden Hildebrand (Matt Cummins kick), Drive: 5 plays, 72 yards, 1:45	7–14
2	14:56	Stephen F. Austin	Zach Conque 6 yard run (Storm Ruiz kick), Drive: 7 plays, 81 yards, 2:09	14–14
2	11:02	Central Arkansas	Carlos Blackman 1 yard run (Matt Cummins kick), Drive: 11 plays, 75 yards, 3:48	14–21
2	0:21	Central Arkansas	Matt Cummins 31 yard field goal, Drive: 12 plays, 40 yards, 4:03	14–24
4	10:20	Central Arkansas	Antwon Wells 1 yard run (Matt Cummins kick), Drive: 2 plays, 9 yards, 0:24	14–31
4	3:53	Central Arkansas	Matt Cummins 22 yard field goal, Drive: 4 plays, 5 yards, 2:06	14–34

=== @ Houston Baptist ===
Stephen F. Austin at Houston Baptist

Team	1	2	3	4	Total
Lumberjacks	7	0	7	10	24
• Huskies	7	7	7	10	31

- Date: November 12
- Location: Husky Stadium
  Houston, TX
- Game start: 2:00 PM CST
- Elapsed time: 3:24
- Game attendance: 3,026
- Referee: Vidal Jones
- Television network: ESPN3

Scoring summary
1	11:18	Stephen F. Austin	Tamrick Pace 32 yard pass from Zach Conque (Storm Ruiz kick), Drive: 10 plays, 75 yards, 3:42	7–0
1	6:57	Houston Baptist	Terranc Peters 26 yard pass from Tony Dawson (Alec Chadwick kick), Drive: 10 plays, 75 yards, 4:21	7–7
2	6:18	Houston Baptist	Ricard Barnett 32 yard pass from Tony Dawson (Alec Chadwick kick), Drive: 3 plays, 52 yards, 1:12	7–14
3	10:56	Stephen F. Austin	Kijana Amous 2 yard run (Storm Ruiz kick), Drive: 8 plays, 64 yards, 2:12	14–14
3	9:54	Houston Baptist	Tony Dawson 83 yard run (Alec Chadwick kick), Drive: 3 plays, 81 yards, 0:55	14–21
4	11:16	Houston Baptist	Tony Dawson 41 yard run (Alec Chadwick kick), Drive: 7 plays, 77 yards, 3:18	14–28
4	8:10	Houston Baptist	Alec Chadwick 34 yard field goal, Drive: 4 plays, 9 yards, 2:44	14–31
4	3:03	Stephen F. Austin	Storm Ruiz 20 yard field goal, Drive: 12 plays, 82 yards, 3:16	17–31
4	2:08	Stephen F. Austin	Justic Liggins 30 yard pass from Zach Conque (Storm Ruiz kick), Drive: 6 plays, 48 yards, 0:55	24–31

=== Northwestern State ===
Northwestern State at Stephen F. Austin

Team	1	2	3	4	Total
Demons	7	14	0	10	31
• Lumberjacks	20	10	7	8	45

- Date: November 19
- Location: Homer Bryce Stadium
  Nacogdoches, TX
- Game start: 3:00 PM CST
- Elapsed time: 3:42
- Game attendance: 7,539
- Referee: Marvel July
- Television network: ESPN3

Scoring summary
1	13:28	Stephen F. Austin	Storm Ruiz 24 yard field goal, Drive: 6 plays, 46 yards, 1:20	3–0
1	10:28	Stephen F. Austin	Tamrick Pace 27 yard pass from Zach Conque (Storm Ruiz kick), Drive: 7 plays, 71 yards, 2:01	10–0
1	8:40	Northwestern State	Bobby Chan-Chan 72 yard pass from Brooks Haack (Eric Piccione kick), Drive: 4 plays, 91 yards, 1:43	10–7
1	7:17	Stephen F. Austin	Cody Williams 20 yard pass from Zach Conque (Storm Ruiz kick), Drive: 4 plays, 67 yards, 1:18	17–7
1	0:03	Stephen F. Austin	Storm Ruiz 31 yard field goal, Drive: 11 plays, 62 yards, 4:07	20–7
2	13:03	Northwestern State	Bobby Chan-Chan 22 yard pass from Brooks Haack (Eric Piccione kick), Drive: 5 plays, 65 yards, 2:00	20–14
2	5:08	Stephen F. Austin	Storm Ruiz 24 yard field goal, Drive: 7 plays, 35 yards, 2:19	23–14
2	1:59	Northwestern State	De'Mard Llorens 3 yard pass from Brooks Haack (Eric Piccione kick), Drive: 7 plays, 71 yards, 3:03	23–21
2	0:09	Stephen F. Austin	Kiki Hill 7 yard pass from Zach Conque (Storm Ruiz kick), Drive: 10 plays, 80 yards, 1:43	30–21
3	12:50	Stephen F. Austin	Loren Easly 13 yard run (Storm Ruiz kick), Drive: 5 plays, 77 yards, 2:06	37–21
4	14:51	Northwestern State	Eric Piccione 47 yard field goal, Drive: 9 plays, 24 yards, 3:22	37–24
4	11:50	Northwestern State	De'Mard Llorens 6 yard run (Eric Piccione kick), Drive: 4 plays, 66 yards, 1:36	37–31
4	3:35	Stephen F. Austin	Loren Easly 11 yard run (Cody Williams pass to Zach Conque for two-point conv.), Drive: 16 plays, 90 yards, 8:07	45–31
