= 2016 Abilene Christian Wildcats football team =

American college football season

2016 Abilene Christian Wildcats football
- Conference: Southland Conference
- Record: 2–9 (2–7 Southland)
- Head coach: Ken Collums (5th season)
- Offensive coordinator: Nathan Young (4th season)
- Offensive scheme: Spread
- Defensive coordinator: Darian Dulin (5th season)
- Base defense: 3–4
- Home stadium: Shotwell Stadium

2016 Southland Conference football standings
	Conf.			Overall
Team	W		L	W		L
No. 5 Sam Houston State $^	9	–	0	12	–	1
No. 14 Central Arkansas ^	8	–	1	10	–	3
SE Louisiana	7	–	2	7	–	4
McNeese State	5	–	4	6	–	5
Nicholls State	5	–	4	5	–	6
Stephen F. Austin	4	–	5	5	–	6
Houston Baptist	3	–	5	4	–	7
Incarnate Word *	3	–	6	3	–	8
Lamar	3	–	6	3	–	8
Abilene Christian *	2	–	7	2	–	9
Northwestern State	0	–	9	1	–	10
$ – Conference champion; ^ – FCS playoff participant; * – ineligible for FCS playoffs due to transition from NCAA Division II; Rankings from STATS poll

The 2016 Abilene Christian Wildcats football team represented Abilene Christian University in the 2016 NCAA Division I FCS football season. The Wildcats were in their final transition season at the FCS level. They were led by fifth-year head coach Ken Collums. They played their home games at Shotwell Stadium. The 2016 season was to be the final season for the Wildcats at Shotwell Stadium. Beginning with the 2017 season, the Wildcats' home will be the on-campus Wildcat Stadium which is currently under construction. They finished the season 2–9, 2–7 in Southland play to finish in tenth place.

== Schedule ==
Date	Time	Opponent	Site	TV	Result	Attendance
September 3	1:00 pm	at Air Force*	Falcon Stadium; Colorado Springs, CO	MW Net/Twitter	L 21–37	34,128
September 10	6:00 pm	Northern Colorado*	Shotwell Stadium; Abilene, TX	ACUSports	L 52–55	8,348
September 17	7:00 pm	at Houston Baptist	Husky Stadium; Houston, TX	FCS	L 24–27 ^{OT}	2,877
September 24	6:00 pm	at Stephen F. Austin	Homer Bryce Stadium; Nacogdoches, TX	ESPN3	L 30–41	8,516
October 1	2:30 pm	Central Arkansas	Shotwell Stadium; Abilene, TX	ASN	L 27–58	4,215
October 8	6:00 pm	Lamar	Shotwell Stadium; Abilene, TX	ACUSports	L 10–38	6,232
October 15	3:00 pm	at No. 2 Sam Houston State	Bowers Stadium; Huntsville, TX	ESPN3	L 21–48	8,319
October 22	2:30 pm	Incarnate Word^{†}	Shotwell Stadium; Abilene, TX	ACUSports	W 52–27	8,957
October 29	6:00 pm	at McNeese State	Cowboy Stadium; Lake Charles, LA	ASN	L 14–33	11,228
November 5	6:00 pm	Northwestern State	Shotwell Stadium; Abilene, TX	ACUSports	W 25–22	3,957
November 12	7:00 pm	at Southeastern Louisiana	Strawberry Stadium; Hammond, LA	Southeastern Channel	L 19–31	4,331
*Non-conference game; ^{†}Homecoming; Rankings from STATS FCS Poll released prior to game Poll released prior to the game; All times are in Central time

== Game summaries ==
=== @ Air Force ===
Abilene Christian at Air Force

Team	1	2	3	4	Total
Wildcats	0	7	7	7	21
• Falcons	7	21	0	9	37

- Date: September 3
- Location: Falcon Stadium
  Colorado Springs, CO
- Game start: 1:00 PM CDT
- Elapsed time: 3:10
- Game attendance: 34,128
- Game weather: 84 °F (29 °C) • Slight wind • Partly sunny
- Referee: Stephen Barron
- TV announcers (MW Net): Ray Crawford, Darius Walker, Shae Peppler

Scoring summary
1	4:57	Air Force	Ryan Reffitt 62 yard pass from Nate Romine (Luke Strebel kick), Drive: 4 plays, 82 yards, 1:31	0–7
2	10:25	Abilene Christian	Josh Fink 8 yard pass from Dallas Sealey (Brendan Cobb kick), Drive: 10 plays, 85 yards, 4:27	7–7
2	8:24	Air Force	Ronald Cleveland 33 yard run (Luke Strebel kick), Drive: 5 plays, 75 yards, 2:01	7–14
2	3:23	Air Force	Timothy McVey 3 yard run (Luke Strebel kick), Drive: 9 plays, 55 yards, 3:24	7–21
2	1:06	Air Force	Ronald Cleveland 62 yard pass from Nate Romine (Luke Strebel kick), Drive: 5 plays, 90 yards, 1:53	7–28
3	10:10	Abilene Christian	D.J. Fuller 43 yard pass from Dallas Sealey (Brendan Cobb kick), Drive: 3 plays, 43 yards, 0:31	14–28
4	13:03	Air Force	Luke Strebel 26 yard field goal, Drive: 10 plays, 72 yards, 3:16	14–31
4	5:27	Air Force	Jalen Robinette 17 yard pass from Arion Worthman (Luke Strebel kick missed), Drive: 13 plays, 79 yards, 5:36	14–37
4	4:14	Abilene Christian	Tracy James 76 yard pass from Dallas Sealey (Brendan Cobb kick), Drive: 3 plays, 75 yards, 1:13	21–37

=== Northern Colorado ===
Northern Colorado at Abilene Christian

Team	1	2	3	4	Total
• Bears	21	14	13	7	55
Wildcats	7	21	21	3	52

- Date: September 10
- Location: Shotwell Stadium
  Abilene, TX
- Game start: 6:00 PM CDT
- Elapsed time: 3:34
- Game attendance: 8,348
- Game weather: 74 °F (23 °C) • Wind NNE 14 mph (23 km/h) • Mostly cloudy
- Referee: Ross Smith
- Television network: ACUSports

Scoring summary
1	13:46	Abilene Christian	Dallas Sealey 49 yard run (Brendan Conn kick), Drive: 5 plays, 75 yards, 1:14	7–0
1	12:43	Northern Colorado	Hakeem Deggs 26 yard pass from Kyle Sloter (Jamie Falloon kick), Drive: 4 plays, 52 yards, 0:53	7–7
1	9:33	Northern Colorado	Trae Riek 3 yard run (Jamie Falloon kick), Drive: 6 plays, 67 yards, 2:34	7–14
1	3:25	Northern Colorado	Stephen Miller 22 yard pass from Kyle Sloter (Jamie Falloon kick), Drive: 9 plays, 81 yards, 3:59	7–21
2	13:58	Northern Colorado	Alex Wesley 37 yard pass from Kyle Sloter (Jamie Falloon kick), Drive: 1 play, 37 yards, 0:06	7–28
2	13:30	Abilene Christian	D.J. Fuller 27 yard pass from Dallas Sealey (Brendan Conn kick), Drive: 2 plays, 61 yards, 0:21	14–28
2	5:05	Abilene Christian	Dallas Sealey 1 yard run (Brendan Conn kick), Drive: 10 plays, 73 yards, 2:33	21–28
2	1:27	Abilene Christian	Dallas Sealey 2 yard run (Brendan Conn kick), Drive: 6 plays, 58 yards, 1:10	28–28
2	0:12	Northern Colorado	Trae Riek 20 yard pass from Kyle Sloter (Jamie Falloon kick), Drive: 6 plays, 61 yards, 1:12	28–35
3	12:34	Northern Colorado	Kyle Sloter 22 yard run (Jamie Falloon kick), Drive: 6 plays, 81 yards, 2:22	28–42
3	12:19	Abilene Christian	Adrian Duncan 46 yard run (Brendan Conn kick), Drive: 1 play, 46 yards, 0:09	35–42
3	8:59	Northern Colorado	Michael McCauley 9 yard pass from Kyle Sloter (Jamie Falloon kick blocked), Drive: 8 plays, 70 yards, 3:15	35–48
3	6:27	Abilene Christian	Dallas Sealey 1 yard run (Brendan Conn kick), Drive: 8 plays, 75 yards, 2:32	42–48
3	1:51	Abilene Christian	Tracy James 2 yard run (Brendan Conn kick), Drive: 9 plays, 38 yards, 3:18	49–48
4	11:22	Abilene Christian	Nik Grau 21 yard field goal, Drive: 4 plays, 5 yards, 1:26	52–48
4	10:09	Northern Colorado	Alex Wesley 59 yard pass from Kyle Sloter (Jamie Falloon kick), Drive: 3 plays, 75 yards, 1:13	52–55

=== @ Houston Baptist ===
Abilene Christian at Houston Baptist

Team	1	2	3	4	OT	Total
Wildcats	8	3	3	7	3	24
• Huskies	7	7	7	0	6	27

- Date: September 17
- Location: Husky Stadium
  Houston, TX
- Game start: 7:00 PM CDT
- Elapsed time: 3:33
- Game attendance: 2,877
- Game weather: 91 °F (33 °C) • Wind SE 7 mph (11 km/h) • Partly cloudy
- Referee: Dan Lewis
- TV announcers (FCS): Tom Franklin, John Harris, Jeff Power

Scoring summary
1	3:22	Houston Baptist	Terranc Peters 7 yard run (Alec Chadwick kick), Drive: 4 plays, 83 yards, 1:59	0–7
1	1:01	Abilene Christian	DJ Fuller 23 yard pass from Dallas Sealey (Parker McKenzie Pass to Dylan Douglass for two-point conv.) Drive: 7 plays, 75 yards, 2:21	8–7
2	0:56	Houston Baptist	Tony Dawson 4 yard run (Alec Chadwick kick), Drive: 5 plays, 75 yards, 0:46	8–14
2	0:00	Abilene Christian	Nik Grau 42 yard field goal, Drive: 5 plays, 45 yards, 0:50	11–14
3	10:01	Abilene Christian	Nik Grau 34 yard field goal, Drive: 11 plays, 54 yards, 3:10	14–14
3	1:08	Houston Baptist	Terrance Peters 2 yard run (Alec Chadwick kick), Drive: 2 plays, 45 yards, 0:34	14–21
4	7:08	Abilene Christian	Dallas Sealey 12 yard run (Nik Grau kick), Drive: 11 plays, 83 yards, 4:10	21–21
OT	15:00	Abilene Christian	Nik Grau 38 yard field goal, Drive: 5 plays, 0 yards, 0:00	24–21
OT	15:00	Houston Baptist	Wesley Lewis 25 yard pass from Tony Dawson, Drive: 5 plays, 0 yards, 0:00	24–27

=== @ Stephen F. Austin ===
Abilene Christian at Stephen F. Austin

Team	1	2	3	4	Total
Wildcats	0	7	15	8	30
• Lumberjacks	14	14	10	3	41

- Date: September 24
- Location: Homer Bryce Stadium
  Nacogdocnes, TX
- Game start: 6:00 PM CDT
- Elapsed time: 4:06
- Game attendance: 8,516
- Game weather: About 85 °F (29 °C) • Wind SSE 6–10 mph (9.7–16.1 km/h) • Partly cloudy, hot
- Referee: Mike Defee
- Television network: ESPN3

Scoring summary
1	1:44	Stephen F. Austin	Nick Jones 37 yard pass from Hunter Taylor (Storm Ruiz kick), Drive: 7 plays, 65 yards, 1:52	0–7
1	0:54	Stephen F. Austin	Tamrick Pace 3 yard pass from Hunter Taylor (Storm Ruiz kick), Drive: 2 plays, 5 yards, 0:38	0–14
2	6:49	Stephen F. Austin	Nick Jones 7 yard pass from Hunter Taylor (Storm Ruiz kick), Drive: 13 plays, 88 yards, 4:00	0–21
2	1:45	Stephen F. Austin	Zach Conque 3 yard run (Storm Ruiz kick), Drive: 8 plays, 80 yards, 2:49	0–28
2	0:22	Abilene Christian	Troy Grant 30 yard pass from Dallas Sealey (Nik Grau kick), Drive: 8 plays, 81 yards, 1:15	7–28
3	7:07	Stephen F. Austin	Storm Ruiz 25 yard field goal, Drive: 4 plays, 3 yards, 1:13	7–31
3	4:00	Stephen F. Austin	Kiki Hill 18 yard pass from Hunter Taylor (Storm Ruiz kick), Drive: 2 plays, 57 yards, 0:21	7–38
3	3:45	Abilene Christian	Justin Miller 93 yard kickoff return (Nik Grau kick)	14–38
3	1:08	Abilene Christian	De'Andre Brown 55 yard pass from Dallas Sealey (Dallas Sealey pass to Adrian Duncan for two-point conv.), Drive: 1 play, 55 yards, 0:11	22–38
4	7:30	Abilene Christian	Troy Grant 6 yard pass from Dallas Sealey (Justin Miller run for two-point conv.), Drive: 14 plays, 80 yards, 4:26	30–38
4	5:17	Stephen F. Austin	Storm Ruiz 20 yard field goal, Drive: 7 plays, 61 yards, 2:08	30–41

=== Central Arkansas ===
Central Arkansas at Abilene Christian

Team	1	2	3	4	Total
• Bears	9	28	14	7	58
Wildcats	7	6	7	7	27

- Date: October 1
- Location: Shotwell Stadium
  Abilene, TX
- Game start: 2:30 PM CDT
- Elapsed time: 3:27
- Game attendance: 4,215
- Game weather: 80 °F (27 °C) • Wind SSE 8 mph (13 km/h) • Sunny
- Referee: Vidal Jones
- Television network: ASN

Scoring summary
1	11:54	Central Arkansas	Team Safety, Drive: 2 plays, -1 yard, 0:29	0–2
1	7:05	Abilene Christian	De'Andre Brown 1 yard run (Nik Grau kick), Drive: 11 plays, 59 yards, 3:17	7–2
1	4:37	Central Arkansas	Jatavious Wilson 32 yard pass from Hayden Hildebrand (Matt Cummins kick), Drive: 6 plays, 57 yards, 2:23	7–9
2	14:48	Central Arkansas	Hayden Hildebrand 80 yard run (Matt Cummins kick), Drive: 3 plays, 81 yards, 1:09	7–16
2	9:53	Abilene Christian	Nik Grau 21 yard field goal, Drive: 8 plays, 47 yards, 2:08	10–16
2	6:12	Central Arkansas	Kelton Warren 1 yard run (Matt Cummins kick), Drive: 8 plays, 48 yards, 3:31	10–23
2	3:54	Abilene Christian	Nik Grau 34 yard field goal, Drive: 9 plays, 43 yards, 2:13	13–23
2	1:12	Central Arkansas	Keshawn Ledet 4 yard run (Matt Cummins kick), Drive: 6 plays, 75 yards, 2:42	13–30
2	0:53	Central Arkansas	George Odum 18 yard interception return (Matt Cummins kick), Drive: 3 plays, 7 yards, 0:19	13–37
3	8:20	Central Arkansas	Keshawn Ledet 7 yard run (Matt Cummins kick), Drive: 6 plays, 65 yards, 2:28	13–44
3	4:48	Abilene Christian	Tracy James 1 yard run (Nik Grau kick), Drive: 8 plays, 69 yards, 3:28	20–44
3	4:33	Central Arkansas	Dwayne Smith 93 yard kickoff return (Matt Cummins kick), Drive: 0 plays, 0 yards, 0:00	20–51
4	11:01	Central Arkansas	Jarvis Cooper 1 yard run (Matt Cummins kick), Drive: 14 plays, 84 yards, 7:00	20–58
4	7:01	Abilene Christian	Cody Ennis 2 yard pass from Parker McKenzie (Nik Grau kick), Drive: 11 plays, 75 yards, 4:00	27–58

=== Lamar ===
Lamar at Abilene Christian

Team	1	2	3	4	Total
• Cardinals	0	17	14	7	38
Wildcats	3	0	7	0	10

- Date: October 8
- Location: Shotwell Stadium
  Abilene, TX
- Game start: 6:00 PM CDT
- Elapsed time: 2:52
- Game attendance: 6,232
- Game weather: 71 °F (22 °C) • Wind ENE 6 mph (9.7 km/h) • Sunny
- Referee: Marvel July
- Television network: ACUSports

Scoring summary
1	12:34	Abilene Christian	Nik Grau 22 yard field goal, Drive: 6 plays, 69 yards, 2:26	3–0
2	13:03	Lamar	Zae Giles 38 yard run (Alex Ball kick), Drive: 9 plays, 81 yards, 4:29	7–3
2	5:28	Lamar	Alex Ball 21 yard field goal, Drive: 14 plays, 76 yards, 6:18	10–3
2	0:43	Lamar	Zae Giles 6 yard pass from Carson Earp (Alex Ball kick), Drive: 9 plays, 84 yards, 3:25	17–3
3	10:04	Lamar	DeWan Thompson 7 yard run (Alex Ball kick), Drive: 3 plays, 32 yards, 1:36	24–3
3	2:53	Lamar	Kad Harrington 28 yard run (Juan Carranco kick), Drive: 8 plays, 76 yards, 4:33	31–3
3	0:10	Abilene Christian	Cody Ennis 6 yard pass from Parker McKenzie (Nik Grau kick), Drive: 12 plays, 61 yards, 2:36	31–10
4	12:05	Lamar	Austin Krautz 19 yard run (Juan Carranco kick), Drive: 6 plays, 66 yards, 2:59	10–38

=== @ Sam Houston State ===
Abilene Christian at Sam Houston State

Team	1	2	3	4	Total
Wildcats	0	0	7	14	21
• #2 Bearkats	7	20	21	0	48

- Date: October 15
- Location: Bowers Stadium
  Huntsville, TX
- Game start: 3:00 PM CST
- Elapsed time: 3:32
- Game attendance: 8,319
- Game weather: 88 °F (31 °C) • Wind S 9 mph (14 km/h) • Sunny
- Referee: Kevin Boutmann
- Television network: ESPN3

Scoring summary
1	0:27	Sam Houston State	Nathan Stewart 69 yard pass from Jeremiah Briscoe (Luc Swimberghe kick), Drive: 4 plays, 78 yards, 1:37	0–7
2	13:30	Sam Houston State	Nathan Stewart 16 yard pass from Jeremiah Briscoe (Luc Swimberghe kick failed), Drive: 3 plays, 42 yards, 0:39	0–13
2	6:45	Sam Houston State	Hayden Cagle 2 yard pass from Jeremiah Briscoe (Luc Swimberghe kick), Drive: 11 plays, 76 yards, 4:17	0–20
2	0:50	Sam Houston State	Tyler Scott 15 yard pass from Jeremiah Briscoe (Luc Swimberghe kick), Drive: 5 plays, 27 yards, 1:15	0–27
3	12:04	Abilene Christian	Josh Fink 8 yard pass from Dallas Sealey (Nik Grau kick), Drive: 8 plays, 75 yards, 2:56	7–27
3	10:01	Sam Houston State	Remus Bulmer 7 yard run (Luc Swimberghe kick), Drive: 6 plays, 75 yards, 2:03	7–34
3	05:27	Sam Houston State	Remus Bulmer 12 yard pass from Jeremiah Briscoe (Luc Swimberghe kick), Drive: 7 plays, 48 yards, 2:33	7–41
3	03:29	Sam Houston State	Deon Hutchinson 4 yard pass from Jeremiah Briscoe (Luc Swimberghe kick), Drive: 3 plays, 12 yards, 1:10	7–48
4	09:16	Abilene Christian	D.J. Fuller 14 yard pass from Dallas Sealey (Nik Grau kick), Drive: 9 plays, 70 yards, 4:19	14–48
4	03:29	Abilene Christian	D.J. Fuller 59 yard pass from Dallas Sealey (Nik Grau kick), Drive: 5 plays, 80 yards, 2:13	21–48

=== Incarnate Word ===
Incarnate Word at Abilene Christian

Team	1	2	3	4	Total
Cardinals	7	0	14	6	27
• Wildcats	14	24	7	7	52

- Date: October 22
- Location: Shotwell Stadium
  Abilene, TX
- Game start: 2:00 PM CDT
- Elapsed time: 3:22
- Game attendance: 8,957
- Game weather: 76 °F (24 °C) • Wind S 15 mph (24 km/h) • Sunny
- Referee: Ross Smith
- Television network: ACUSports
Sources: Box Score

Scoring summary
1	12:09	Abilene Christian	De'Andre Brown 11 yard run (Nik Grau kick), Drive: 9 plays, 75 yards, 2:51	7–0
1	09:11	Incarnate Word	Trent Brittain 1 yard run (Cody Seidel kick), Drive: 5 plays, 30 yards, 1:54	7–7
1	06:16	Abilene Christian	Troy Grant 5 yard pass from Dallas Sealey (Nik Grau kick), Drive: 8 plays, 75 yards, 2:55	14–7
2	10:53	Abilene Christian	Adrian Duncan 6 yard pass from Dallas Sealey (Nik Grau kick), Drive: 11 plays, 64 yards, 4:07	21–7
2	02:19	Abilene Christian	Tracy James 9 yard run (Nik Grau kick), Drive: 8 plays, 62 yards, 3:34	28–7
2	01:28	Abilene Christian	Troy Grant 32 yard pass from Dallas Sealey (Nik Grau kick), Drive: 2 plays, 35 yards, 0:40	35–7
2	00:04	Abilene Christian	Nik Grau 44 yard field goal, Drive: 4 plays, 29 yards, 0:56	38–7
3	10:34	Incarnate Word	Trent Brittain 2 yard run (Cody Seidel kick), Drive: 16 plays, 75 yards, 4:26	38–14
3	07:34	Abilene Christian	D.J. Fuller 25 yard pass from Dallas Sealey (Nik Grau kick), Drive: 7 plays, 56 yards, 3:00	45–14
3	02:21	Incarnate Word	Broderick Reeves 3 yard run (Cody Seidel kick), Drive: 4 plays, 25 yards, 0:52	45–21
4	13:10	Abilene Christian	Adrian Duncan 41 yard pass from Dallas Sealey (Nik Grau kick), Drive: 9 plays, 64 yards, 4:02	52–21
4	12:09	Incarnate Word	Jamari Gilbert 16 yard pass from Taylor Laird (Cody Seidel kick blocked), Drive: 5 plays, 70 yards, 1:01	52–27

=== @ McNeese State ===
Abilene Christian at McNeese State

Team	1	2	3	4	Total
Wildcats	7	0	0	7	14
• Cowboys	10	9	7	7	33

- Date: October 29
- Location: Cowboy Stadium
  Lake Charles, LA
- Game start: 6:00 PM CDT
- Elapsed time: 3:17
- Game attendance: 11,228
- Game weather: 80 °F (27 °C) • Wind SSW 5 mph (8.0 km/h) • 47%, Partly cloudy
- Referee: Scott Campbell
- Television network: ASN

Scoring summary
1	10:36	McNeese State	Justin Pratt 4 yard run (Khalil Thomas kick), Drive: 7 plays, 51 yards, 3:31	0–7
1	6:16	Abilene Christian	Troy Grant 13 yard pass from Dallas Sealey (Nik Grau kick), Drive: 2 plays, 16 yards, 0:38	7–7
1	1:57	McNeese State	Gunnar Raborn 27 yard field goal, Drive: 9 plays, 64 yards, 4:19	7–10
2	5:27	McNeese State	Lawayne Ross 13 yard pass from James Tabary (Gunnar Raborn kick blocked), Drive: 11 plays, 71 yards, 6:18	7–16
2	0:13	McNeese State	Gunnar Raborn 47 yard field goal, Drive: 4 plays, 4 yards, 1:27	7–19
3	11:30	McNeese State	Justin Pratt 1 yard run (Gunnar Raborn kick), Drive: 10 plays, 67 yards, 3:30	7–26
4	7:37	McNeese State	Benjamin Jones 16 yard pass from James Tabary (Gunnar Raborn kick), Drive: 10 plays, 50 yards, 5:40	7–33
4	4:41	Abilene Christian	Tracy James 1 yard run (Nik Grau kick), Drive: 8 plays, 73 yards, 2:56	14–33

=== Northwestern State ===
Northwestern State at Abilene Christian

Team	1	2	3	4	Total
Demons	13	0	6	3	22
• Wildcats	2	3	9	11	25

- Date: November 5
- Location: Shotwell Stadium
  Abilene, TX
- Game start: 6:00 PM CDT
- Elapsed time: 3:07
- Game attendance: 3,957
- Game weather: 68 °F (20 °C) • Wind ESE 11 mph (18 km/h) • Cloudy
- Referee: Ross Smith
- Television network: ACUSports

Scoring summary
1	11:02	Northwestern State	Ronald Green 41 yard run (Eric Piccione kick blocked), Drive: 6 plays, 65 yards, 1:48	0–6
1	11:02	Abilene Christian	Keith Barnett defensive kick conv., Drive: 6 plays, 65 yards, 1:48	2–6
1	6:12	Northwestern State	De'Mard Llorens 36 yard pass from J.D. Almond (Eric Piccione kick), Drive: 5 plays, 60 yards, 2:21	2–13
2	6:55	Abilene Christian	Nik Grau 42 yard field goal, Drive: 10 plays, 46 yards, 3:59	5–13
3	9:15	Abilene Christian	Nik Grau 30 yard field goal, Drive: 9 plays, 47 yards, 2:43	8–13
3	4:33	Northwestern State	De'Mard Llorens 1 yard run (two-point pass conv. failed), Drive: 11 plays, 71 yards, 4:34	8–19
3	1:20	Abilene Christian	Tracy James 5 yard pass from Dallas Sealey (two-point pass conv. failed), Drive: 8 plays, 79 yards, 3:06	14–19
4	12:16	Abilene Christian	Nik Grau 41 yard field goal, Drive: 10 plays, 56 yards, 2:36	17–19
4	8:36	Abilene Christian	Dallas Sealey 1 yard run (De'Andre Brown pass to Trevor Crain for two-point conv.), Drive: 7 plays, 81 yards, 1:39	25–19
4	4:31	Northwestern State	Eric Piccione 40 yard field goal, Drive: 9 plays, 43 yards, 4:05	25–22

- This will be Abilene Christian's final game at Shotwell Stadium.

=== @ Southeastern Louisiana ===
Abilene Christian at Southeastern Louisiana

Team	1	2	3	4	Total
Wildcats	3	10	6	0	19
• Lions	14	7	10	0	31

- Date: November 12
- Location: Strawberry Stadium
  Hammond, LA
- Game start: 7:00 PM CDT
- Elapsed time: 3:24
- Game attendance: 4,331
- Game weather: 58 °F (14 °C) • Wind N 5 mph (8.0 km/h) • Clear, fair
- Referee: Michael VanderVelde
- Television network: Southeastern Channel

Scoring summary
1	7:32	Southeastern Louisiana	Juwaan Rogers 30 yard pass from Justin Alo (Jonathon Tatum kick), Drive: 10 plays, 88 yards, 4:45	0–7
1	4:11	Abilene Christian	Nik Grau 30 yard field goal, Drive: 10 plays, 60 yards, 3:15	3–7
1	2:20	Southeastern Louisiana	Brandon Acker 13 yard pass from Justin Alo (Jonathon Tatum kick), Drive: 5 plays, 74 yards, 1:46	3–14
2	11:48	Abilene Christian	Dallas Sealey 3 yard pass from De'Andre Brown (Nik Grau kick), Drive: 3 plays, 12 yards, 1:01	10–14
2	7:25	Abilene Christian	Nik Grau 43 yard field goal, Drive: 7 plays, 31 yards, 3:16	13–14
2	0:38	Southeastern Louisiana	Julius Maracalin 2 yard run (Jonathon Tatum kick), Drive: 4 plays, 42 yards, 1:19	13–21
3	10:28	Southeastern Louisiana	Jake Jiannoni 4 yard fumble return (Jonathon Tatum kick), Drive: 2 plays, -6 yards, 0:11	13–28
3	9:50	Abilene Christian	Josh Fink 48 yard pass from Dallas Sealey (two-point pass conv. failed), Drive: 2 plays, 65 yards, 0:38	19–28
3	0:44	Southeastern Louisiana	Jonathon Tatum 23 yard field goal, Drive: 10 plays, 83 yards, 3:36	19–31
