= 2016 McNeese State Cowboys football team =

American college football season

2016 McNeese State Cowboys football
- Conference: Southland Conference
- Record: 6–5 (5–4 Southland)
- Head coach: Lance Guidry (1st season)
- Offensive coordinator: Landon Hoefer (1st season)
- Defensive coordinator: Tony Restivo (1st season)
- Home stadium: Cowboy Stadium

2016 Southland Conference football standings
	Conf.			Overall
Team	W		L	W		L
No. 5 Sam Houston State $^	9	–	0	12	–	1
No. 14 Central Arkansas ^	8	–	1	10	–	3
SE Louisiana	7	–	2	7	–	4
McNeese State	5	–	4	6	–	5
Nicholls State	5	–	4	5	–	6
Stephen F. Austin	4	–	5	5	–	6
Houston Baptist	3	–	5	4	–	7
Incarnate Word *	3	–	6	3	–	8
Lamar	3	–	6	3	–	8
Abilene Christian *	2	–	7	2	–	9
Northwestern State	0	–	9	1	–	10
$ – Conference champion; ^ – FCS playoff participant; * – ineligible for FCS playoffs due to transition from NCAA Division II; Rankings from STATS poll

The 2016 McNeese State Cowboys football team represented McNeese State University as a member of the Southland Conference during the 2016 NCAA Division I FCS football season. Led by first-year head coach Lance Guidry, the Cowboys compiled an overall record of 6–5 with a mark of 5–4 in conference play, tying for fourth place in the Southland. McNeese State played home games at Cowboy Stadium in Lake Charles, Louisiana.

== Schedule ==
Date	Time	Opponent	Rank	Site	TV	Result	Attendance
September 3	6:00 pm	Tarleton State*	No. 11	Cowboy Stadium; Lake Charles, LA	AACI	W 33–3	11,901
September 10	6:00 pm	at Louisiana–Lafayette*	No. 11	Cajun Field; Lafayette, LA (Cajun Crown)	ESPN3	L 22–30	26,891
September 17	6:00 pm	Stephen F. Austin	No. 14	Cowboy Stadium; Lake Charles, LA	ASN	L 28–31	11,742
September 24	6:00 pm	at Incarnate Word	No. 24	Gayle and Tom Benson Stadium; San Antonio, TX	UIWtv	W 42–35	4,798
October 1	6:00 pm	Nicholls State	No. 23	Cowboy Stadium; Lake Charles, LA	CST, ESPN3	W 38–13	10,130
October 8	6:00 pm	at Southeastern Louisiana	No. 20	Strawberry Stadium; Hammond, LA	ESPN3	L 24–31	6,165
October 15	6:00 pm	No. 23 Central Arkansas		Cowboy Stadium; Lake Charles, LA (Red Beans and Rice Bowl)	ESPN3	L 0–35	9,253
October 22	6:00 pm	at Northwestern State		Harry Turpin Stadium; Natchitoches, LA (rivalry)	DemonTV	W 48–27	10,159
October 29	6:00 pm	Abilene Christian		Cowboy Stadium; Lake Charles, LA	ASN	W 33–14	11,228
November 5	6:00 pm	at No. 1 Sam Houston State		Bowers Stadium; Huntsville, TX	ESPN3	L 43–56	8,025
November 19	6:00 pm	Lamar		Cowboy Stadium; Lake Charles, LA (Battle of the Border)	AACI	W 41–10	8,804
*Non-conference game; Rankings from STATS Poll released prior to the game; All times are in Central time

== Game summaries ==
=== Tarleton State ===
Tarleton State at McNeese State

Team	1	2	3	4	Total
Texans	3	0	0	0	3
• #11 Cowboys	0	20	13	0	33

- Date: September 3
- Location: Cowboy Stadium
  Lake Charles, LA
- Game start: 6:00 PM CDT
- Elapsed time: 2:55
- Game attendance: 11,901
- Game weather: 91 °F (33 °C) • Wind NE 7 mph (11 km/h) • Partly cloudy
- Referee: Eddie Kelley

Scoring summary
1	4:20	Tarleton State	Sergio Sroka 20 yard field goal, Drive: 7 plays, 79 yards, 1:19	0–3
2	12:36	McNeese State	Trent Manuel 22 yard field goal, Drive: 14 plays, 70 yards, 6:44	3–3
2	10:07	McNeese State	Dylan Long 1 yard run (Trent Manuel kick), Drive: 4 plays, 39 yards, 1:37	10–3
2	5:06	McNeese State	Darious Crawley 35 yard pass from James Tabary (Trent Manuel kick), Drive: 5 plays, 49 yards, 2:37	17–3
2	0:00	McNeese State	Trent Manuel 24 yard field goal, Drive: 10 plays, 44 yards, 2:52	20–7
3	10:01	McNeese State	Darious Crawley 19 yard pass from James Tabary (Trent Manuel kick), Drive: 7 plays, 62 yards, 3:34	27–3
3	3:30	McNeese State	Dylan Long 6 yard run (two-point run conv. failed), Drive: 5 plays, 51 yards, 1:57	33–3

=== @ Louisiana–Lafayette ===
McNeese State at Louisiana–Lafayette

Team	1	2	3	4	Total
#11 Cowboys	3	9	3	7	22
• Ragin' Cajuns	7	7	13	3	30

- Date: September 10
- Location: Cajun Field
  Lafayette, LA
- Game start: 6:00 PM CDT
- Elapsed time: 3:28
- Game attendance: 26,891
- Game weather: 79 °F (26 °C) • Wind E 4 mph (6.4 km/h) • Partly cloudy
- Referee: Jason Autrey
- Television network: ESPN3

Scoring summary
1	8:33	McNeese State	Trent Manuel 33 yard field goal, Drive: 14 plays, 59 yards, 6:27	3–0
1	4:11	Louisiana–Lafayette	Ja'Marcus Bradley 17 yard pass from Anthony Jennings (Stevie Artigue kick), Drive: 1 play, 17 yards, 0:05	3–7
2	9:36	McNeese State	Trent Manuel 40 yard field goal, Drive: 14 plays, 35 yards, 6:01	6–7
2	6:14	Louisiana–Lafayette	Anthony Jennings 3 yard run (Stevie Artigue kick), Drive: 10 plays, 82 yards, 3:22	6–14
2	0:30	McNeese State	Dylan Long 1 yard run (two-point pass conv. failed), Drive: 13 plays, 75 yards, 5:44	12–14
3	9:31	McNeese State	Trent Manuel 28 yard field goal, Drive: 10 plays, 45 yards, 3:24	15–14
3	7:18	Louisiana–Lafayette	Raymond Calais 7 yard run (Stevie Artigue kick), Drive: 6 plays, 61 yards, 2:13	15–21
3	4:02	Louisiana–Lafayette	Anthony Jennings 5 yard run (two-point pass conv. failed), Drive: 3 plays, 50 yards, 0:51	15–27
4	5:01	Louisiana–Lafayette	Stevie Artigue 17 yard field goal, Drive: 14 plays, 81 yards, 5:36	15–30
4	0:12	McNeese State	Dylan Long 3 yard run (Trent Manuel kick), Drive: 13 plays, 80 yards, 1:59	22–30

=== Stephen F. Austin ===
Stephen F. Austin at McNeese State

Team	1	2	3	4	Total
• Lumberjacks	10	7	7	7	31
#14 Cowboys	7	7	7	7	28

- Date: September 17
- Location: Cowboy Stadium
  Lake Charles, LA
- Game start: 6:00 PM CDT
- Elapsed time: 3:50
- Game attendance: 11,742
- Game weather: 82 °F (28 °C) • Wind E 1 mph (1.6 km/h) • Partly cloudy
- Referee: Ross Smith
- Television network: ASN

Scoring summary
1	12:11	Stephen F. Austin	Zach Conque 36 yard run (Storm Ruiz kick), Drive: 7 plays, 67 yards, 1:54	0–7
1	7:44	Stephen F. Austin	Storm Ruiz 40 yard field goal, Drive: 6 plays, 59 yards, 1:45	0–10
1	5:11	McNeese State	Darious Crawley 60 yard pass from James Tabary (Trent Manuel kick), Drive: 5 plays, 77 yards, 2:33	7–10
2	13:28	Stephen F. Austin	Trae Hart 30 yard pass from Zach Conque (Storm Ruiz kick), Drive: 3 plays, 31 yards, 0:42	7–17
2	5:17	McNeese State	Kent Shelby 44 yard pass from James Tabary (Trent Manuel kick), Drive: 4 plays, 74 yards, 1:44	14–17
3	7:25	McNeese State	Kent Shelby 5 yard pass from James Tabary (Gunnar Raborn kick), Drive: 5 plays, 50 yards, 2:19	21–17
3	6:17	Stephen F. Austin	De'Quann Ruffin 58 yard pass from Zach Conque (Storm Ruiz kick), Drive: 3 plays, 68 yards, 1:08	21–24
4	14:56	McNeese State	Darious Crawley 10 yard pass from James Tabary (Gunnar Raborn kick), Drive: 7 plays, 52 yards, 2:04	28–24
4	3:35	Stephen F. Austin	Tamrick Pace 4 yard pass from Hunter Taylor (Storm Ruiz kick), Drive: 5 plays, 42 yards, 1:27	28–31

=== @ Incarnate Word ===
McNeese State at Incarnate Word

Team	1	2	3	4	Total
• #24 Cowboys	14	21	7	0	42
Cardinals	7	7	0	21	35

- Date: September 24
- Location: Gayle and Tom Benson Stadium
  San Antonio, TX
- Game start: 6:00 PM CDT
- Elapsed time: 3:24
- Game attendance: 4,798
- Game weather: 77 °F (25 °C) • Wind NW 8 mph (13 km/h) • Scattered showers
- Referee: Mike Cuttone
- Television network: UIWtv
Sources: Box Score

Scoring summary
1	8:09	Incarnate Word	Jordan Hicks 34 yard pass from Trent Brittain (Cody Seidel kick), 5 plays, 68 yards, 2:24	7–0
1	4:50	McNeese State	Ryan Ross 5 yard run (Gunnar Raborn kick), Drive: 7 plays, 75 yards, 3:19	7–7
1	3:00	McNeese State	Lawayne Ross 2 yard run (Gunnar Raborn kick), Drive: 2 plays, 39 yards, 0:31	14–7
2	14:48	McNeese State	Dariou Crawley 85 yard pass from James Tabary (Gunnar Raborn kick), Drive: 2 plays, 86 yards, 0:39	21–7
2	5:55	McNeese State	Damon Gladney 2 yard pass from James Tabary (Gunnar Raborn kick), Drive: 7 plays, 59 yards, 3:18	28–7
2	1:16	Incarnate Word	Broderick Reeves 5 yard run (Cody Seidel kick), Drive: 2 plays, 15 yards, 0:32	28–14
2	1:04	McNeese State	Khalil Thomas 97 yard kickoff return (Gunnar Raborn kick)	35–14
3	14:50	McNeese State	Christi Jacobs 22 yard fumble recovery (Gunnar Raborn kick)	42–14
4	12:40	Incarnate Word	Kody Edwards 9 yard pass from Trent Brittain (Cody Seidel kick), Drive: 13 plays, 80 yards, 4:41	42–21
4	6:19	Incarnate Word	Dorland Fields 53 yard run (Cody Seidel kick), Drive: 1 play, 53 yards, 0:09	42–28
4	1:37	Incarnate Word	Trent Brittain 11 yard run (Cody Seidel kick), Drive: 6 plays, 36 yards, 1:53	42–35

=== Nicholls State ===
Nicholls at McNeese State

Team	1	2	3	4	Total
Colonels	3	0	3	7	13
• #23 Cowboys	7	14	7	10	38

- Date: October 1
- Location: Cowboy Stadium
  Lake Charles, LA
- Game start: 6:00 PM CDT
- Elapsed time: 3:18
- Game attendance: 10,130
- Game weather: 80 °F (27 °C) • Wind NE 2 mph (3.2 km/h) • Partly cloudy
- Referee: Dan Lewis
- Television network: CST/ESPN3

Scoring summary
1	8:10	McNeese State	Andre Fuller 27 yard interception return (Gunnar Raborn kick), Drive: 3 plays, 6 yards, 1:13	7–0
1	3:08	Nicholls	David McKey 23 yard field goal, Drive: 12 plays, 79 yards, 5:02	7–3
2	6:24	McNeese State	Ryan Ross 4 yard run (Gunnar Raborn kick), Drive: 9 plays, 46 yards, 3:56	14–3
2	0:18	McNeese State	Parker Orgeron 8 yard pass from James Tabary (Gunnar Raborn kick), Drive: 8 plays, 73 yards, 1:46	21–3
3	10:44	Nicholls	David McKey 33 yard field goal, Drive: 11 plays, 72 yards, 4:16	21–6
3	5:17	McNeese State	Ryan Ross 11 yard run (Gunnar Raborn kick), Drive: 12 plays, 66 yards, 5:27	28–6
4	13:35	McNeese State	Gunnar Raborn 37 yard field goal, Drive: 7 plays, 28 yards, 2:35	31–6
4	8:10	McNeese State	Kylon Highshaw 80 yard pass from James Tabary (Gunnar Raborn kick), Drive: 1 play, 80 yards, 0:12	38–6
4	3:54	Nicholls	Team 0 yard fumble return (David McKey kick), Drive: 13 plays, 74 yards, 4:16	38–13

=== @ Southeastern Louisiana ===
McNeese State at Southeastern Louisiana

Team	1	2	3	4	Total
#20 Cowboys	0	14	3	7	24
• Lions	7	0	17	7	31

- Date: October 8
- Location: Strawberry Stadium
  Hammond, LA
- Game start: 6:00 PM CDT
- Elapsed time: 3:21
- Game attendance: 6,165
- Game weather: 83 °F (28 °C) • Wind N 12 mph (19 km/h) • Sunny
- Referee: Kevin Hassell
- Television network: ESPN3

Scoring summary
1	10:33	Southeastern Louisiana	Max Lyons 0 yard fumble recovery (Jonathon Tatum kick), Drive: 4 plays, -20 yards, 1:26	0–7
2	14:55	McNeese State	Nick Edwards 11 yard pass from James Tabary (Gunnar Raborn kick), Drive: 9 plays, 34 yards, 5:11	7–7
2	6:41	McNeese State	Dylan Long 4 yard pass from James Tabary (Gunnar Raborn kick), Drive: 7 plays, 71 yards, 3:40	14–7
3	13:55	Southeastern Louisiana	Juwaan Rogers 36 yard pass from Justin Alo (Jonathon Tatum kick), Drive: 3 plays, 75 yards, 1:05	14–14
3	10:51	Southeastern Louisiana	Bransen Schwebel 17 yard pass from Justin Alo (Jonathon Tatum kick), Drive: 3 plays, 25 yards, 1:35	14–21
3	9:22	McNeese State	Gunnar Raborn 30 yard field goal, Drive: 5 plays, 57 yards, 1:21	17–21
3	5:34	Southeastern Louisiana	Jonathon Tatum 41 yard field goal, Drive: 10 plays, 52 yards, 3:42	17–24
4	7:42	McNeese State	Lawayne Ross 19 yard run (Gunnar Raborn kick), Drive: 9 plays, 80 yards, 4:03	24–24
4	0:08	Southeastern Louisiana	Brandon Acker 82 yard pass from Justin Alo (Jonathon Tatum kick), Drive: 2 plays, 85 yards, 0:39	24–31

=== Central Arkansas ===
Central Arkansas at McNeese State

Team	1	2	3	4	Total
• #23 Bears	7	7	14	7	35
Cowboys	0	0	0	0	0

- Date: October 15
- Location: Cowboy Stadium
  Lake Charles, LA
- Game start: 6:00 PM CDT
- Elapsed time: 3:06
- Game attendance: 9,253
- Game weather: 84 °F (29 °C) • Wind SSE 8 mph (13 km/h) • Partly cloudy, 62% humidity
- Referee: C. Castleberry
- Television network: ESPN3

Scoring summary
1	5:52	Central Arkansas	Kelton Warren 4 yard run (Matt Cummins kick), Drive: 6 plays, 38 yards, 2:15	0–7
2	7:57	Central Arkansas	Antwon Wells 10 yard run (Matt Cummins kick), Drive: 3 plays, 23 yards, 0:34	0–14
3	12:06	Central Arkansas	Antwon Wells 8 yard run (Matt Cummins kick), Drive: 7 plays, 74 yards, 2:54	0–21
3	9:20	Central Arkansas	Jatavio Wilson 33 yard pass from Hay Hildebrand (Matt Cummins kick), Drive: 3 plays, 38 yards, 0:48	0–28
4	8:01	Central Arkansas	Roman Gordon 83 yard pass from Hay Hildebrand (Matt Cummins kick), Drive: 3 plays, 87 yards, 1:32	0–35

=== @ Northwestern State ===
McNeese State at Northwestern State

Team	1	2	3	4	Total
• Cowboys	14	7	17	10	48
Demons	7	7	10	3	27

- Date: October 22
- Location: Harry Turpin Stadium
  Natchitoches, LA
- Game start: 6:00 PM CDT
- Elapsed time: 3:24
- Game attendance: 10,159
- Game weather: 71 °F (22 °C) • Wind ESE 3 mph (4.8 km/h) • Clear and crisp
- Referee: Kevin Muir
- Television network: DTV

Scoring summary
1	9:45	McNeese State	Ryan Ross 4 yard run (Gunnar Raborn kick), Drive: 9 plays, 75 yards, 5:10	7–0
1	8:13	Northwestern State	Bobb Chan-Chan 7 yard pass from Brooks Haack (Eric Piccione kick), Drive: 5 plays, 67 yards, 1:25	7–7
1	0:10	McNeese State	Dylan Long 3 yard pass from James Tabary (Gunnar Raborn kick), Drive: 9 plays, 74 yards, 4:12	14–7
2	6:48	McNeese State	Kent Shelby 22 yard pass from James Tabary (Gunnar Raborn kick), Drive: 8 plays, 78 yards, 4:15	21–7
2	2:44	Northwestern State	Ronald Green 28 yard run (Eric Piccione kick), Drive: 8 plays, 84 yards, 3:59	21–14
3	12:43	Northwestern State	Shakeir Ryan 26 yard run (Eric Piccione kick), Drive: 5 plays, 72 yards, 2:10	21–21
3	9:02	McNeese State	Gunnar Raborn 27 yard field goal, Drive: 8 plays, 65 yards, 3:36	24–21
3	6:56	McNeese State	Justin Pratt 47 yard run (Gunnar Raborn kick), Drive: 2 plays, 56 yards, 0:58	31–21
3	4:04	McNeese State	Kylon Highshaw 6 yard pass from James Tabary (Gunnar Raborn kick), Drive: 4 plays, 71 yards, 1:22	38–21
3	1:07	Northwestern State	Eric Piccione 30 yard field goal, Drive: 8 plays, 58 yards, 2:51	38–24
4	12:56	McNeese State	Gunnar Raborn 25 yard field goal, Drive: 9 plays, 77 yards, 3:05	41–24
4	7:29	Northwestern State	Eric Piccione 30 yard field goal, Drive: 6 plays, 47 yards, 1:46	41–27
4	1:25	McNeese State	Jermai Antoine 70 yard interception return (Gunnar Raborn kick), Drive: 5 plays, 31 yards, 1:30	48–27

=== Abilene Christian ===
Abilene Christian at McNeese State

Team	1	2	3	4	Total
Wildcats	7	0	0	7	14
• Cowboys	10	9	7	7	33

- Date: October 29
- Location: Cowboy Stadium
  Lake Charles, LA
- Game start: 6:00 PM CDT
- Elapsed time: 3:17
- Game attendance: 11,228
- Game weather: 80 °F (27 °C) • Wind SSW 5 mph (8.0 km/h) • 47% relative humidity, Partly cloudy
- Referee: Scott Campbell
- Television network: ASN

Scoring summary
1	10:36	McNeese State	Justin Pratt 4 yard run (Khalil Thomas kick), Drive: 7 plays, 51 yards, 3:31	7–0
1	6:16	Abilene Christian	Troy Grant 13 yard pass from Dallas Sealey (Nik Grau kick), Drive: 2 plays, 16 yards, 0:38	7–7
1	1:57	McNeese State	Gunnar Raborn 27 yard field goal, Drive: 9 plays, 64 yards, 4:19	10–7
2	5:27	McNeese State	Lawayne Ross 13 yard pass from James Tabary (Gunnar Raborn kick blocked), Drive: 11 plays, 71 yards, 6:18	16–7
2	0:13	McNeese State	Gunnar Raborn 47 yard field goal, Drive: 4 plays, 4 yards, 1:27	19–7
3	11:30	McNeese State	Justin Pratt 1 yard run (Gunnar Raborn kick), Drive: 10 plays, 67 yards, 3:30	26–7
4	7:37	McNeese State	Benjamin Jones 16 yard pass from James Tabary (Gunnar Raborn kick), Drive: 10 plays, 50 yards, 5:40	33–7
4	4:41	Abilene Christian	Tracy James 1 yard run (Nik Grau kick), Drive: 8 plays, 73 yards, 2:56	33–14

=== @ Sam Houston State ===
McNeese State at Sam Houston State

Team	1	2	3	4	Total
Cowboys	0	9	21	13	43
• #1 Bearkats	14	14	21	7	56

- Date: November 5
- Location: Bowers Stadium
  Huntsville, TX
- Game start: 6:00 PM CST
- Elapsed time: 3:28
- Game attendance: 8,025
- Game weather: 68 °F (20 °C) • Wind N 4 mph (6.4 km/h) • Overcast
- Referee: Marvel July
- Television network: ESPN3

Scoring summary
1	8:13	Sam Houston State	Davion Davis 28 yard pass from Jeremiah Briscoe (Luc Swimberghe kick), Drive: 7 plays, 80 yards, 2:22	0–7
1	5:27	Sam Houston State	Nathan Stewart 52 yard pass from Jeremiah Briscoe (Luc Swimberghe kick), Drive: 5 plays, 89 yards, 1:37	0–14
2	11:04	McNeese State	Gunnar Raborn 41 yard field goal, Drive: 9 plays, 51 yards, 3:16	3–14
2	9:36	Sam Houston State	Yedidiah Louis 45 yard pass from Jeremiah Briscoe (Luc Swimberghe kick), Drive: 5 plays, 56 yards, 1:23	3–21
2	6:33	Sam Houston State	Ragan Henderson 1 yard run (Luc Swimberghe kick), Drive: 5 plays, 51 yards, 1:34	3–28
2	1:29	McNeese State	Kent Shelby 4 yard pass from James Tabary (two-point run conv. failed), Drive: 12 plays, 75 yards, 5:04	9–28
3	12:39	McNeese State	Justin Pratt 39 yard run (Gunnar Raborn kick), Drive: 5 plays, 75 yards, 2:21	16–28
3	10:13	Sam Houston State	Nathan Stewart 11 yard pass from Jeremiah Briscoe (Luc Swimberghe kick), Drive: 6 plays, 42 yards, 2:17	16–35
3	9:02	McNeese State	Darious Crawley 19 yard pass from James Tabary (Gunnar Raborn kick), Drive: 6 plays, 74 yards, 1:05	23–35
3	5:39	Sam Houston State	Collin Rison 2 yard pass from Jeremiah Briscoe (Luc Swimberghe kick), Drive: 9 plays, 59 yards, 3:18	23–42
3	3:25	McNeese State	Kylon Highshaw 8 yard pass from James Tabary (Gunnar Raborn kick), Drive: 5 plays, 75 yards, 2:14	30–42
3	0:54	Sam Houston State	Nathan Stewart 35 yard pass from Jeremiah Briscoe (Luc Swimberghe kick), Drive: 8 plays, 80 yards, 2:24	30–49
4	11:25	McNeese State	Kent Shelby 11 yard pass from James Tabary (Gunnar Raborn kick blocked), Drive: 13 plays, 77 yards, 4:24	36–49
4	6:57	McNeese State	Tavarious Battiste 55 yard pass from James Tabary (Gunnar Raborn kick), Drive: 3 plays, 68 yards, 1:11	43–49
4	5:42	Sam Houston State	Ragan Henderson 2 yard run (Luc Swimberghe kick), Drive: 4 plays, 81 yards, 1:09	43–56

=== Lamar ===
Lamar at McNeese State

Team	1	2	3	4	Total
Cardinals	0	3	0	7	10
• Cowboys	14	14	7	6	41

- Date: November 19
- Location: Cowboy Stadium
  Lake Charles, LA
- Game start: 6:00 PM CST
- Elapsed time: 3:07
- Game attendance: 8,804
- Game weather: 56 °F (13 °C) • Wind N 7 mph (11 km/h) • Clear, 29% relative humidity
- Referee: Marvel July
- Television network: AACI

Scoring summary
1	13:26	McNeese State	Ryan Ross 6 yard run (Gunnar Raborn kick), Drive: 4 plays, 54 yards, 1:34	7–0
1	0:40	McNeese State	Dylan Long 3 yard run (Gunnar Raborn kick), Drive: 18 plays, 94 yards, 8:21	14–0
2	13:09	McNeese State	Darious Crawley 19 yard pass from James Tabary (Gunnar Raborn kick), Drive: 3 plays, 84 yards, 1:11	21–0
2	8:33	Lamar	Juan Carranco 37 yard field goal, Drive: 10 plays, 46 yards, 4:36	21–3
2	4:23	McNeese State	Justin Pratt 3 yard run (Gunnar Raborn kick), Drive: 5 plays, 31 yards, 2:33	28–3
3	3:11	McNeese State	Jermaine Antoine 65 yard interception return (Gunnar Raborn kick), Drive: 5 plays, 28 yards, 3:03	35–3
4	13:58	Lamar	Martell Hawthorne 32 yard pass from Adam Morse (Juan Carranco kick), Drive: 4 plays, 36 yards, 0:54	35–10
4	11:34	McNeese State	James Tabary 26 yard run (Gunnar Raborn kick blocked), Drive: 5 plays, 62 yards, 2:24	41–10

== Ranking movements ==
Ranking movements Legend: ██ Increase in ranking ██ Decrease in ranking — = Not ranked RV = Received votes
	Week													
Poll	Pre	1	2	3	4	5	6	7	8	9	10	11	12	Final
STATS FCS	11	11	14	24	23	20	RV	—	RV	RV	—	—	RV	—
Coaches	9	10	13	20	22	19	RV	—	—	—	—	—	—	—
