= 2016 Houston Baptist Huskies football team =

American college football season

2016 Houston Baptist Huskies football
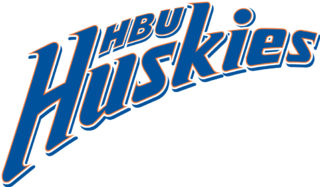
- Conference: Southland Conference
- Record: 4–7 (3–5 Southland)
- Head coach: Vic Shealy (4th season)
- Offensive coordinator: Scott Smith (4th season)
- Offensive scheme: Multiple
- Co-defensive coordinators: Roger Hinshaw (4th season); Charlie Camp (2nd season)
- Base defense: 4–3
- Home stadium: Husky Stadium

2016 Southland Conference football standings
	Conf.			Overall
Team	W		L	W		L
No. 5 Sam Houston State $^	9	–	0	12	–	1
No. 14 Central Arkansas ^	8	–	1	10	–	3
SE Louisiana	7	–	2	7	–	4
McNeese State	5	–	4	6	–	5
Nicholls State	5	–	4	5	–	6
Stephen F. Austin	4	–	5	5	–	6
Houston Baptist	3	–	5	4	–	7
Incarnate Word *	3	–	6	3	–	8
Lamar	3	–	6	3	–	8
Abilene Christian *	2	–	7	2	–	9
Northwestern State	0	–	9	1	–	10
$ – Conference champion; ^ – FCS playoff participant; * – ineligible for FCS playoffs due to transition from NCAA Division II; Rankings from STATS poll

The 2016 Houston Baptist Huskies football team represented Houston Baptist University—now known as Houston Christian University—as a member of the Southland Conference during the 2016 NCAA Division I FCS football season. Led by fourth-year head coach Vic Shealy the Huskies compiled an overall record of 4–7 with a mark of 4–5 in conference play, placing seventh in the Southland. Houston Baptist played home games at Husky Stadium in Houston.

== Schedule ==
Date	Time	Opponent	Site	TV	Result	Attendance
September 1	6:00 p.m.	at Central Arkansas	Estes Stadium; Conway, AR	ASN	L 13–56	9,757
September 10	7:00 p.m.	Texas Southern*	Husky Stadium; Houston, TX	RSSW	W 24–20	4,125
September 17	7:00 p.m.	Abilene Christian	Husky Stadium; Houston, TX	FCSC	W 27–24 ^{OT}	2,877
September 24	7:00 p.m.	No. 2 Sam Houston State	Husky Stadium; Houston, TX	FCSC	L 16–52	3,134
October 1	6:00 p.m.	at Western Kentucky*	Houchens Industries–L. T. Smith Stadium; Bowling Green, KY	CUSA.tv	L 3–50	17,331
October 15	7:00 p.m.	Nicholls^{†}	Husky Stadium; Houston, TX	FSGO	L 30–33 ^{2OT}	3,217
October 22	4:00 p.m.	at Southeastern Louisiana	Strawberry Stadium; Hammond, LA	TSC	L 3–37	6,603
October 29	6:00 p.m.	at Lamar	Provost Umphrey Stadium; Beaumont, TX	ESPN3	W 24–17	7,777
November 5	7:00 p.m.	at UTEP*	Sun Bowl; El Paso, TX	CUSA.tv	L 10–42	15,977
November 12	2:00 p.m.	Stephen F. Austin	Husky Stadium; Houston, TX	ESPN3	W 31–24	3,026
November 19	7:00 p.m.	at Incarnate Word	Gayle and Tom Benson Stadium; San Antonio, TX	FCSC	L 26–28	6,498
*Non-conference game; ^{†}Homecoming; Rankings from STATS Poll released prior to the game; All times are in Central time

* Games were televised on tape delay.

== Game summaries ==
=== @ Central Arkansas ===
Houston Baptist at Central Arkansas

Team	1	2	3	4	Total
Huskies	0	3	3	7	13
• Bears	21	21	14	0	56

- Date: September 1
- Location: Estes Stadium
  Conway, AR
- Game start: 6:00 PM CDT
- Elapsed time: 3:22
- Game attendance: 9,757
- Referee: Ross Smith
- TV announcers (ASN): Lincoln Rose, Shea Walker, Kamady Rudd

Scoring summary
1	11:52	Central Arkansas	Desmond Smith 3 yard pass from Hayden Hildebrand (Matt Cummins kick), Drive: 5 plays, 54 yards, 1:29	0–7
1	5:51	Central Arkansas	Kelton Warren 14 yard run (Matt Cummins kick), Drive: 6 plays, 63 yards, 1:28	0–14
1	2:18	Central Arkansas	Hayden Hildebrand 1 yard run (Matt Cummins kick), Drive: 8 plays, 67 yards, 2:24	0–21
2	12:17	Central Arkansas	Tyler Williams 54 yard return of blocked field goal (Matt Cummins kick), Drive: 14 plays, 48 yards, 4:56	0–28
2	7:18	Central Arkansas	Brandon Cox 37 yard pass from Hayden Hildebrand (Matt Cummins kick), Drive: 10 plays, 80 yards, 3:43	0–35
2	6:32	Central Arkansas	Devin Spurlock 2 yard fumble return (Matt Cummins kick), Drive: 2 plays, -18 yards, 0:41	0–42
2	3:34	Houston Baptist	Alec Chadwick 26 yard field goal, Drive: 8 plays, 68 yards, 2:54	3–42
3	9:09	Central Arkansas	Antwon Wells 2 yard run (Matt Cummins kick), Drive: 7 plays, 56 yards, 1:39	3–49
3	4:27	Houston Baptist	Alec Chadwick 32 yard field goal, Drive: 4 plays, -2 yards, 1:04	6–49
3	1:45	Central Arkansas	Keshawn Ledet 13 yard run (Matt Cummins kick), Drive: 7 plays, 75 yards, 2:42	6–56
4	6:47	Houston Baptist	David Racine 31 yard pass from Max Staver (Alec Chadwick kick), Drive: 5 plays, 44 yards, 1:17	13–56

=== Texas Southern ===
Texas Southern at Houston Baptist

Team	1	2	3	4	Total
Tigers	0	7	0	13	20
• Huskies	7	0	10	7	24

- Date: September 10
- Location: Husky Stadium
  Houston, TX
- Game start: 7:00 PM CDT
- Elapsed time: 3:22
- Game attendance: 4,125
- Referee: Eddie Kelley
- TV announcers (RSSW): Tom Franklin, John Harris, John Prendergast

Scoring summary
1	12:19	Houston Baptist	Terrance Peters 34 yard run (Alec Chadwick kick), Drive: 7 plays, 75 yards, 2:41	7–0
2	3:46	Texas Southern	Tylor Cook 16 yard run (Eric Medina kick), Drive: 4 plays, 62 yards, 2:19	7–7
3	8:27	Houston Baptist	Alec Chadwick 22 yard field goal, Drive: 13 plays, 86 yards, 3:02	10–7
3	6:43	Houston Baptist	Terrance Manderville 0 yard fumble return (Alec Chadwick kick), Drive: 3 plays, -30 yards, 1:39	17–7
4	7:47	Texas Southern	Austin Watts 8 yard pass from Averion Hurts (Eric Medina kick blocked), Drive: 9 plays, 80 yards, 4:43	17–13
4	5:53	Texas Southern	Austin Watts 93 yard punt return (Eric Medina kick), Drive: 3 plays, 6 yards, 1:45	17–20
4	4:08	Houston Baptist	Terrance Peters 51 yard run (Alec Chadwick kick), Drive: 5 plays, 75 yards, 1:45	24–20

=== Abilene Christian ===
Abilene Christian at Houston Baptist

Team	1	2	3	4	OT	Total
Wildcats	8	3	3	7	3	24
• Huskies	7	7	7	0	6	27

- Date: September 17
- Location: Husky Stadium
  Houston, TX
- Game start: 7:00 PM CDT
- Elapsed time: 3:33
- Game attendance: 2,877
- Game weather: 91 °F (33 °C) • Wind SE 7 mph (11 km/h) • Partly cloudy
- Referee: Dan Lewis
- TV announcers (FCSC): Tom Franklin, John Harris, Jeff Power

Scoring summary
1	3:22	Houston Baptist	Terranc Peters 7 yard run (Alec Chadwick kick), Drive: 4 plays, 83 yards, 1:59	7–0
1	1:01	Abilene Christian	D.J. Fuller 23 yard pass from Dallas Sealey (Parker McKenzie Pass to Dylan Douglass for two-point conv.) Drive: 7 plays, 75 yards, 2:21	7–8
2	0:56	Houston Baptist	Tony Dawson 4 yard run (Alec Chadwick kick), Drive: 5 plays, 75 yards, 0:46	14–8
2	0:00	Abilene Christian	Nik Grau 42 yard field goal, Drive: 5 plays, 45 yards, 0:50	14–11
3	10:01	Abilene Christian	Nik Grau 34 yard field goal, Drive: 11 plays, 54 yards, 3:10	14–14
3	1:08	Houston Baptist	Terrance Peters 2 yard run (Alec Chadwick kick), Drive: 2 plays, 45 yards, 0:34	21–14
4	7:08	Abilene Christian	Dallas Sealey 12 yard run (Nik Grau kick), Drive: 11 plays, 83 yards, 4:10	21–21
OT	15:00	Abilene Christian	Nik Grau 38 yard field goal, Drive: 5 plays, 0 yards, 0:00	21–24
OT	15:00	Houston Baptist	Wesley Lewis 25 yard pass from Tony Dawson, Drive: 5 plays, 0 yards, 0:00	27–24

=== Sam Houston State ===
Sam Houston State at Houston Baptist

Team	1	2	3	4	Total
• #2 Bearkats	21	10	7	14	52
Huskies	0	6	10	0	16

- Date: September 24
- Location: Husky Stadium
  Houston, TX
- Game start: 7:00 pm CDT
- Elapsed time: 3:26
- Game attendance: 3,134
- Game weather: 85 °F (29 °C) • Wind ESE 6 mph (9.7 km/h) • Mostly cloudy
- Referee: Ross Smith
- TV announcers (FCSC): Tom Franklin, John Harris, Jeff Power

Scoring summary
1	13:04	Sam Houston State	Javin Webb 1 yard run (Luc Swimberghe kick), Drive: 9 plays, 75 yards, 1:56	0–7
1	6:23	Sam Houston State	Yedidiah Louis 48 yard pass from Jeremiah Briscoe (Luc Swimberghe kick), Drive: 5 plays, 87 yards, 0:58	0–14
1	2:42	Sam Houston State	Javin Webb 13 yard run (Luc Swimberghe kick), Drive: 7 plays, 82 yards, 2:01	0–21
2	13:06	Sam Houston State	Nathan Stewart 8 yard pass from Jeremiah Briscoe (Luc Swimberghe kick), Drive: 3 plays, 51 yards, 0:41	0–28
2	10:07	Houston Baptist	Alec Chadwick 21 yard field goal, Drive: 8 plays, 71 yards, 2:59	3–28
2	7:20	Sam Houston State	Luc Swimberghe 29 yard field goal, Drive: 8 plays, 60 yards, 2:41	3–31
2	2:13	Houston Baptist	Alec Chadwick 46 yard field goal, Drive: 11 plays, 51 yards, 5:00	6–31
3	12:16	Houston Baptist	Alec Chadwick 24 yard field goal, Drive: 13 plays, 68 yards, 2:44	9–31
3	5:46	Houston Baptist	Mev Ajdin 12 yard pass from Tony Dawson (Alec Chadwick kick), Drive: 9 plays, 80 yards, 3:38	16–31
3	3:25	Sam Houston State	Davion Davis 17 yard pass from Jeremiah Briscoe (Luc Swimberghe kick), Drive: 2 plays, 45 yards, 0:22	16–38
4	14:16	Sam Houston State	Remus Bulmer 1 yard run (Luc Swimberghe kick), Drive: 10 plays, 77 yards, 2:31	16–45
4	9:26	Sam Houston State	Remus Bulmer 13 yard run (Luc Swimberghe kick), Drive: 8 plays, 75 yards, 3:23	16–52

=== @ Western Kentucky ===
Houston Baptist at Western Kentucky

Team	1	2	3	4	Total
Huskies	3	0	0	0	3
• Hilltoppers	14	16	20	0	50

- Date: October 1
- Location: Houchens Industries–L. T. Smith Stadium
  Bowling Green, KY
- Game start: 6:00 PM CDT
- Elapsed time: 3:01
- Game attendance: 17,331
- Game weather: 72 °F (22 °C) • Wind SW 13 mph (21 km/h) • Clear
- Referee: Ken Antee
- TV announcers (CUSA.tv): Randy Lee, Leo Peckenpaugh, Terry Obee

Scoring summary
1	13:31	Western Kentucky	Anthony Wales 45 yard run (Skyler Simcox kick), Drive: 4 plays, 82 yards, 1:29	0–7
1	6:33	Western Kentucky	Nicholas Norris 34 yard pass from Mike White (Ryan Nuss kick), Drive: 4 plays, 60 yards, 1:18	0–14
1	0:34	Houston Baptist	Alec Chadwick 25 yard field goal, Drive: 15 plays, 76 yards, 5:59	3–14
2	11:19	Western Kentucky	Nicholas Norris 19 yard pass from Mike White (Skyler Simcox kick), Drive: 10 plays, 68 yards, 4:15	3–21
2	5:59	Western Kentucky	Skyler Simcox 50 yard field goal, Drive: 10 plays, 41 yards, 3:43	3–24
2	0:25	Western Kentucky	Taywan Taylor 80 yard pass from Mike White (two-point pass conv. failed), Drive: 4 plays, 90 yards, 1:13	3–30
3	9:34	Western Kentucky	Nicholas Norris 85 yard run (Ryan Nuss kick failed), Drive: 1 play, 85 yards, 0:13	3–36
3	8:23	Western Kentucky	Nacarius Fant 50 yard punt return (Skyler Simcox kick), Drive: 3 plays, -2 yards, 1:11	3–43
3	4:31	Western Kentucky	Marquez Trigg 12 yard run (Ryan Nuss kick), Drive: 5 plays, 45 yards, 1:30	3–50

=== Nicholls ===
Nicholls at Houston Baptist (homecoming)

Team	1	2	3	4	OT	Total
• Colonels	7	14	0	6	6	33
Huskies	3	7	10	7	3	30

- Date: October 15
- Location: Husky Stadium
  Houston, TX
- Game start: 7:00 PM CDT
- Elapsed time: 3:29
- Game attendance: 3,217
- Game weather: 84 °F (29 °C) • Wind SE 10 mph (16 km/h) • Partly cloudy
- Referee: Vidal Jones
- TV announcers (FSGO): Neal Raphael, Jeff Power, Ashley Prendergast

Scoring summary
1	9:17	Houston Baptist	Alec Chadwick 34 yard field goal, Drive: 15 plays, 58 yards, 5:43	3–0
1	4:17	Nicholls	Ronald Ollie 84 yard blocked field goal return (David McKey kick), Drive: 9 plays, 46 yards, 3:27	3–7
2	14:22	Houston Baptist	B.J. Kelly 2 yard run (Alec Chadwick kick), Drive: 12 plays, 75 yards, 4:49	10–7
2	6:37	Nicholls	Dami Jeanpiere 50 yard pass from Chase Fourcade (David McKey kick), Drive: 5 plays, 65 yards, 2:10	10–14
2	3:17	Nicholls	Chase Fourcade 10 yard run (David McKey kick), Drive: 4 plays, 87 yards, 1:26	10–21
3	10:50	Houston Baptist	Ricard Barnett 6 yard pass from Tony Dawson (Alec Chadwick kick), Drive: 8 plays, 54 yards, 2:48	17–21
3	2:07	Houston Baptist	Alec Chadwick 35 yard field goal, Drive: 14 plays, 68 yards, 5:37	20–21
4	11:26	Nicholls	David McKey 44 yard field goal, Drive: 4 plays, 4 yards, 1:22	20–24
4	1:25	Houston Baptist	Tony Dawson 24 yard run (Alec Chadwick kick), Drive: 14 plays, 94 yards, 5:42	27–24
4	0:06	Nicholls	David McKey 35 yard field goal, Drive: 9 plays, 57 yards, 1:19	27–27
OT	15:00	Houston Baptist	Alec Chadwick 35 yard field goal, Drive: 9 plays, 0 yards, 0:00	30–27
OT	15:00	Nicholls	C.J. Okpalobi 12 yard run, Drive: 9 plays, 0 yards, 0:00	30–33

=== @ Southeastern Louisiana ===
Houston Baptist at Southeastern Louisiana

Team	1	2	3	4	Total
Huskies	3	0	0	0	3
• Lions	7	9	14	7	37

- Date: October 22
- Location: Strawberry Stadium
  Hammond, LA
- Game start: 4:00 PM CDT
- Elapsed time: 3:00
- Game attendance: 6,603
- Referee: Eddy Shelton
- TV announcers (Southeastern Channel): John Sartori, Wesley Boone, Richie Solares

Scoring summary
1	10:15	Southeastern Louisiana	Rasheed Harrell 51 yard run (Jonathan Tatum kick), Drive: 4 plays, 80 yards, 1:49	0–7
1	0:00	Houston Baptist	Alec Chadwick 43 yard field goal, Drive: 10 plays, 42 yards, 4:28	3–7
2	13:53	Southeastern Louisiana	Julius Maracalin 8 yard run (Jonathan Tatum kick failed), Drive: 5 plays, 65 yards, 1:07	3–13
2	0:00	Southeastern Louisiana	Jonathan Tatum 22 yard field goal, Drive: 11 plays, 90 yards, 1:18	3–16
3	9:34	Southeastern Louisiana	Brandon Acker 11 yard pass from D'Shaie Landor (Jonathan Tatum kick), Drive: 10 plays, 61 yards, 5:19	3–23
3	2:44	Southeastern Louisiana	Jake Ingraffia 22 yard pass from D'Shaie Landor (Jonathan Tatum kick), Drive: 12 plays, 90 yards, 5:04	3–30
4	6:04	Southeastern Louisiana	Darius Durall 16 yard run (Jonathan Tatum kick), Drive: 2 plays, 17 yards, 0:44	3–37

=== @ Lamar ===
Houston Baptist at Lamar

Team	1	2	3	4	Total
• Huskies	7	0	10	7	24
Cardinals	7	3	0	7	17

- Date: October 29
- Location: Provost Umphrey Stadium
  Beaumont, TX
- Game start: 6:00 PM CDT
- Elapsed time: 3:32
- Game attendance: 7,777
- Game weather: 80 °F (27 °C) • Sunny and warm
- Referee: M. Vanderveld
- Television network: ESPN3

Scoring summary
1	12:53	Houston Baptist	B.J. Kelly 3 yard run (Alec Chadwick kick), Drive: 4 plays, 14 yards, 1:47	7–0
1	7:08	Lamar	Zae Giles 6 yard pass from Case Robinson (Juan Carranco kick), Drive: 4 plays, 60 yards, 2:24	7–7
2	2:03	Lamar	Juan Carranco 26 yard field goal, Drive: 7 plays, 57 yards, 3:02	7–10
3	12:04	Houston Baptist	Alec Chadwick 33 yard field goal, Drive: 7 plays, 47 yards, 2:48	10–10
3	5:21	Houston Baptist	Mev Ajdin 31 yard pass from Tony Dawson (Alec Chadwick kick), Drive: 3 plays, 38 yards, 0:56	17–10
4	12:09	Houston Baptist	Isaiah Hall 44 yard pass from Tony Dawson (Alec Chadwick kick), Drive: 5 plays, 67 yards, 2:03	24–10
4	7:57	Lamar	DeWan Thompson 8 yard pass from Adam Morse (Juan Carranco kick), Drive: 9 plays, 46 yards, 2:38	24–17

=== @ UTEP ===
Houston Baptist at UTEP

Team	1	2	3	4	Total
Huskies	0	3	7	0	10
• Miners	14	14	7	7	42

- Date: November 5
- Location: Sun Bowl Stadium
  El Paso, TX
- Game start: 7:00 PM CDT
- Elapsed time: 3:02
- Game attendance: 15,977
- Referee: Jonathan Noli
- Television network: CUSA.tv

Scoring summary
1	13:45	UTEP	Aaron Jones 39 yard run (Jay Mattox kick), Drive: 4 plays, 77 yards, 1:15	0–7
1	1:30	UTEP	Hayden Plinke 9 yard pass from Ryan Metz (Jay Mattox kick), Drive: 7 plays, 80 yards, 3:58	0–14
2	14:53	UTEP	Cole Freytag 18 yard pass from Ryan Metz (Jay Mattox kick), Drive: 2 plays, 15 yards, 0:44	0–21
2	13:36	UTEP	Aaron Jones 62 yard run (Jay Mattox kick), Drive: 2 plays, 78 yards, 0:52	0–28
2	8:36	Houston Baptist	Alec Chadwick 52 yard field goal, Drive: 9 plays, 40 yards, 5:00	3–28
3	9:02	UTEP	Kevin Dove 7 yard run (Jay Mattox kick), Drive: 8 plays, 78 yards, 4:13	3–35
3	1:29	Houston Baptist	Terrance Peters 29 yard pass from Max Staver (Alec Chadwick kick), Drive: 1 play, 29 yards, 0:07	10–35
4	10:22	UTEP	Hayden Plinke 11 yard pass from Ryan Metz (Jay Mattox kick), Drive: 13 plays, 75 yards, 6:07	10–42

=== Stephen F. Austin ===
Stephen F. Austin at Houston Baptist

Team	1	2	3	4	Total
Lumberjacks	7	0	7	10	24
• Huskies	7	7	7	10	31

- Date: November 12
- Location: Husky Stadium
  Houston, TX
- Game start: 2:00 PM CST
- Elapsed time: 3:24
- Game attendance: 3,026
- Referee: Vidal Jones
- Television network: ESPN3

Scoring summary
1	11:18	Stephen F. Austin	Tamrick Pace 32 yard pass from Zach Conque (Storm Ruiz kick), Drive: 10 plays, 75 yards, 3:42	0–7
1	6:57	Houston Baptist	Terranc Peters 26 yard pass from Tony Dawson (Alec Chadwick kick), Drive: 10 plays, 75 yards, 4:21	7–7
2	6:18	Houston Baptist	Ricard Barnett 32 yard pass from Tony Dawson (Alec Chadwick kick), Drive: 3 plays, 52 yards, 1:12	14–7
3	10:56	Stephen F. Austin	Kijana Amous 2 yard run (Storm Ruiz kick), Drive: 8 plays, 64 yards, 2:12	14–14
3	9:54	Houston Baptist	Tony Dawson 83 yard run (Alec Chadwick kick), Drive: 3 plays, 81 yards, 0:55	21–14
4	11:16	Houston Baptist	Tony Dawson 41 yard run (Alec Chadwick kick), Drive: 7 plays, 77 yards, 3:18	28–14
4	8:10	Houston Baptist	Alec Chadwick 34 yard field goal, Drive: 4 plays, 9 yards, 2:44	31–14
4	3:03	Stephen F. Austin	Storm Ruiz 20 yard field goal, Drive: 12 plays, 82 yards, 3:16	31–17
4	2:08	Stephen F. Austin	Justic Liggins 30 yard pass from Zach Conque (Storm Ruiz kick), Drive: 6 plays, 48 yards, 0:55	31–24

=== @ Incarnate Word ===
Houston Baptist at Incarnate Word

Team	1	2	3	4	Total
Huskies	0	10	0	16	26
• Cardinals	7	0	14	7	28

- Date: November 19
- Location: Gayle and Tom Benson Stadium
  San Antonio, TX
- Game start: 7:00 PM CST
- Elapsed time: 3:20
- Game attendance: 6,498
- Game weather: 74 °F (23 °C) • Wind SE 12 mph (19 km/h) • Partly cloudy
- Referee: Ross Smith
- Television network: FCSC
Sources: Box Score

Scoring summary
1	10:45	Incarnate Word	Jamari Gilbert 76 yard pass from Trent Brittain (Cody Seidel kick), Drive: 4 plays, 88 yards, 1:42	0–7
2	7:40	Houston Baptist	Alec Chadwick 43 yard field goal, Drive: 4 plays, -3 yards, 1:21	7–7
2	0:33	Houston Baptist	Tony Dawson 2 yard run (Alec Chadwick kick), Drive: 8 plays, 68 yards, 2:17	10–7
3	7:00	Incarnate Word	John Oglesby 4 yard pass from Trent Brittain (Cody Seidel kick), Drive: 8 plays, 53 yards, 3:47	10–14
3	1:49	Incarnate Word	Trent Brittain 1 yard run (Cody Seidel kick), Drive: 12 plays, 53 yards, 4:15	10–21
4	14:49	Houston Baptist	Alec Chadwick 60 yard field goal, Drive: 7 plays, 32 yards, 2:00	13–21
4	6:02	Incarnate Word	Jordan Hicks 14 yard pass from Trent Brittain (Cody Seidel kick), Drive: 18 plays, 75 yards, 8:47	13–28
4	4:55	Houston Baptist	B.J. Kelly 6 yard run (Alec Chadwick kick), Drive: 4 plays, 64 yards, 1:00	20–28
4	2:07	Houston Baptist	Tony Dawson 6 yard run (two-point pass conv. failed), Drive: 7 plays, 56 yards, 2:17	26–28
