= 2016 Incarnate Word Cardinals football team =

American college football season

2016 Incarnate Word Cardinals football
- Conference: Southland Conference
- Record: 3–8 (3–6 Southland)
- Head coach: Larry Kennan (5th season)
- Offensive coordinator: Tony Marciano (7th season)
- Offensive scheme: Multiple
- Defensive coordinator: Brian Gamble (5th season)
- Base defense: 3–4
- Home stadium: Gayle and Tom Benson Stadium

2016 Southland Conference football standings
	Conf.			Overall
Team	W		L	W		L
No. 5 Sam Houston State $^	9	–	0	12	–	1
No. 14 Central Arkansas ^	8	–	1	10	–	3
SE Louisiana	7	–	2	7	–	4
McNeese State	5	–	4	6	–	5
Nicholls State	5	–	4	5	–	6
Stephen F. Austin	4	–	5	5	–	6
Houston Baptist	3	–	5	4	–	7
Incarnate Word *	3	–	6	3	–	8
Lamar	3	–	6	3	–	8
Abilene Christian *	2	–	7	2	–	9
Northwestern State	0	–	9	1	–	10
$ – Conference champion; ^ – FCS playoff participant; * – ineligible for FCS playoffs due to transition from NCAA Division II; Rankings from STATS poll

The 2016 Incarnate Word Cardinals football team represented the University of the Incarnate Word in the 2016 NCAA Division I FCS football season. This was the Cardinals' final transition season of collegiate football at the FCS level. They were led by fifth-year head coach Larry Kennan. They played their home games at Gayle and Tom Benson Stadium. They finished the season 3–8, 3–6 in Southland play to finish in a tie for eighth place.

== TV and radio ==
All Incarnate Word games will be broadcast on Texas Sports Radio Network with the voices of Gabe Farias and Shawn Morris. KUIW Radio will also produce a student media broadcast every week, that will be available online, and they will provide streaming of all non-televised home games via UIWtv.

== Schedule ==
Date	Time	Opponent	Site	TV	Result	Attendance
September 3	6:00 pm	Texas A&M–Kingsville*	Gayle and Tom Benson Stadium; San Antonio, TX	UIWtv	L 22–31	4,400
September 8	6:00 pm	at Northwestern State	Harry Turpin Stadium; Natchitoches, LA	ASN	W 21–18	9,120
September 17	3:00 pm	at Nicholls State	Manning Field at John L. Guidry Stadium; Thibodaux, LA	NOLA	L 28–35	6,283
September 24	6:00 pm	No. 24 McNeese State	Gayle and Tom Benson Stadium; San Antonio, TX	UIWtv	L 35–42	4,798
October 1	6:30 pm	at Texas State*	Bobcat Stadium; San Marcos, TX	ESPN3	L 17–48	22,845
October 8	6:00 pm	No. 2 Sam Houston State	Gayle and Tom Benson Stadium; San Antonio, TX	ESPN3/UIWtv	L 48–63	5,322
October 22	2:30 pm	at Abilene Christian	Shotwell Stadium; Abilene, TX	ACUSports	L 27–52	8,957
October 29	6:00 pm	Stephen F. Austin	Gayle and Tom Benson Stadium; San Antonio, TX	UIWtv	L 19–42	2,811
November 5	2:30 pm	Southeastern Louisiana^{†}	Gayle and Tom Benson Stadium; San Antonio, TX	UIWtv	L 10–30	5,746
November 12	6:00 pm	at Lamar	Provost Umphrey Stadium; Beaumont, TX	ESPN3	W 35–28	5,566
November 17	7:00 pm	Houston Baptist	Gayle and Tom Benson Stadium; San Antonio, TX	FCS Central	W 28–26	6,498
*Non-conference game; ^{†}Homecoming; Rankings from STATS FCS Poll released prior to game Poll released prior to the game; All times are in Central time

== Personnel ==
=== Coaching staff ===
Name	Position	Alma mater	Joined staff
Larry Kennan	Head coach	La Verne	2012
Todd Ivicic	Associate head coach / Defensive Line / special teams coordinator	Sam Houston State	2008
Tony Marciano	Assistant Head Coach / offensive coordinator / Offensive Line	IUP	2010
Brian Gamble	Defensive Coordinator / Inside Linebackers	Texas A&M	2008
Kyle Kennan	Passing Game Coordinator / wide receivers	Roger Williams	2008
Nick Debose	Defensive Backs / video coordinator	Southeastern Oklahoma	2008
Larry Moore	Running Backs / academic coordinator	BYU	2011
Sean Davis	Quarterbacks / recruiting coordinator / Compliance Liaison	Azusa Pacific	2013
Robert Lyles	Outside Linebackers / Housing Liaison	TCU	2015
Mike Barela	Nickel Backs / travel coordinator	North Texas	2015
Tres Sullivan	Tight ends	New Mexico	2016
Robert Churchman	Special Assistant to the head coach / Football Operations	Sul Ross	2016
Darin Lovat	Strength and Conditioning Coach	UNLV	2012
T.R. St. Charles	Head Football Athletic Trainer	Vanderbilt	2008

=== Roster ===
2016 Incarnate Word Cardinals Football
Quarterback: 4 Trent Brittain (C) – (redshirt) junior (6'3, 210); 8 Taylor Laird – (redshirt) junior (6'4, 225); 12 David Johnson – freshman (6'1, 172); Running back: 7 Dorland Fields – (redshirt) sophomore (5'9, 195); 10 Junior Sessions – senior (5'11, 212); 20 Keshon Leonard – (redshirt) sophomore (5'7, 170); 21 Desmond Hite – freshman (5'9, 178); 25 Broderick Reeves – senior (5'9, 205); 35 Darian Canada – freshman (5'8, 170); 49 Dontae McGee – freshman (5'11, 185); Wide receiver: 2 Jordan Hicks – senior (5'8, 175); 5 Breylann McCollum – (redshirt) junior (6'1, 207); 6 Lamont Johnson – sophomore (6'0, 170); 14 Isaiah Townes – freshman (6'0, 180); 16 Daryl Brooks – (redshirt) junior (6'4, 205); 22 Jamari Gilbert – (redshirt) junior (6'2, 200); 80 Kolby Anthony – freshman (5'10, 180); 81 Kody Edwards – junior (6'0, 165); 82 Aaron Freeman – freshman (5'11, 170); 84 Cam Johnson – freshman (6'0, 178); 85 Anthony Marciano – (redshirt) sophomore (6'0, 185); 86 Kevin Stone – freshman (5'10, 160); 88 Ethan Gonzalez – sophomore (5'11, 177); Tight end: 44 Cyril Clarke (C) – (redshirt) senior (6'1, 220); 47 Josh Esukpa – (redshirt) junior (6'1, 245); 83 Travis Quillin – freshman (6'2, 220); 87 Dillon Manz – (redshirt) freshman (6'2, 208); 89 John Myers – (redshirt) freshman (6'6, 250); H-Back: 29 John Oglesby – senior (6'1, 220); 46 Phillip Higgins – (redshirt) freshman (6'0, 260)	Offensive line: 53 Matt McCarthy – C – (redshirt) senior (6'3, 285); 57 Devyn Jensen – OG – junior (6'3, 285); 61 Draven Taylor (C) – OT – (redshirt) junior (6'2, 292); 63 Tyler Preston – C – (redshirt) sophomore (6'3, 300); 64 Roberto Limon – OG – (redshirt) sophomore (6'3, 315); 66 Levi Swang – OL – freshman (6'5, 280); 69 Trevor Mason – OT – (redshirt) senior (6'7, 295); 70 Ryan Carlson – OT – freshman (6'7, 260); 71 Aaron Rodriguez – OL – sophomore (6'3, 285); 72 Brandon Floores – C – freshman (6'4, 280); 74 Cameron Wilson – OT – (redshirt) freshman (6'5, 300); 75 Jeremy Jones – OG – (redshirt) freshman (6'5, 287); 76 Austin Jennings – OG – (redshirt) junior (6'4, 295); 77 Terence Hickman II – OT – freshman (6'3, 260); 78 Uzoma Okere – OL – freshman (6'2, 260); 79 Mark Palacios Jr. – OL – freshman (6'2, 290); Defensive line: 54 Corey Lee – DE – (redshirt) junior (6'0, 280); 55 Darius Montgomery – DE – (redshirt) sophomore (6'2, 260); 62 Axel Werner – NT – freshman (6'0, 300); 73 Noah Moreno – DE – freshman (6'1, 250); 90 Matthew Yarbrough – DE – freshman (6'0, 279); 93 Tyler Colbert – NT – (redshirt) junior (6'2, 295); 95 Jordan Collins – NT – (redshirt) junior (5'10, 299); 96 John Williams – NT – sophomore (6'3, 290); 97 Eric England – NT – (redshirt) sophomore (6'2, 314); 98 Jawara Beasley – DE – junior (6'3, 247); 99 Alex Jenkins – DE – (redshirt) senior (6'6, 270); Place kicker: 37 Alejandro Lugo – freshman (5'8, 160); 39 James Liker – junior (6'1, 200); 41 Cody Seidel – sophomore (6'2, 210); Punter: 36 Oscar Draguicevich – freshman (5'9, 165); 42 Chase Ellerbee – (redshirt) freshman (6'2, 210)	Linebacker: 3 Greg Lemon – OLB – (redshirt) junior (6'2, 245); 9 Josh Zellars (C) – ILB – senior (6'0, 210); 15 Quandre Washington – ILB – junior (6'1, 226); 33 Joel Higgins – ILB – senior (6'0, 225); 34 Mar’kel Cooks – ILB – freshman (6'0, 215); 43 Michael Allen – ILB – senior (6'0, 210); 50 George Schwanenberg – ILB – junior (5'11, 220); 51 Denzel Thomas – OLB – junior (6'1, 225); 52 Israel Acuay – OLB – (redshirt) sophomore (6'2, 238); 56 Noah McMeans – OLB – sophomore (6'4, 220); 59 West Lambert – ILB – (redshirt) freshman (6'0, 230); 92 Blake Klumpp – OLB – (redshirt) sophomore (6'3, 235); Defensive back: 1 Daryl Irby (C) – CB – (redshirt) senior (5'10, 175); 11 Marquis Lawson – CB/WR – freshman (5'9, 165); 13 Jeilyn Williams – CB – junior (5'9, 170); 17 Sean Hoeferkamp – S – junior (6'1, 205); 18 Adrian Norwood Jr. (C) – S – senior (6'0, 210); 23 Kyle Covington – CB – freshman (6'2, 180); 24 Chris Thomas – S – freshman (6'2, 185); 26 Robert Hayes Jr. – S – freshman (6'2, 185); 27 Trey Colbert – S – (redshirt) senior (6'0, 215); 28 LaDarian McFarland – S – freshman (6'3, 200); 31 Randalle Williams-Diaz – CB – sophomore (6'0, 175); 32 Jamarkese Williams – CB – (redshirt) sophomore (6'3, 190); 35 Jawun Jiles – S – sophomore (5'10, 193); 38 Tim McCoy – S – (redshirt) sophomore (5'10, 190); 40 Deavy’aun Thomas – S – (redshirt) junior (6'0, 175); 45 Sharqurius Miller – CB – freshman (5'10, 185); Long snapper: 60 Matthew Swanson – freshman (6'0, 225)

== Depth chart ==
Defense

FS
27 Trey Colbert, Sr
17 Sean Hoeferkamp, Jr
28 LaDarian McFarland, Fr

WLB	ILB	ILB	SLB
56 Noah McMeans, So	15 Quandre Washington, Jr	9 Josh Zellars, Sr	51 Denzel Thomas, Jr
92 Blake Klumpp, So	33 Joel Higgins, Sr	43 Michael Allen, Sr	52 Israel Acuay, So
⋅	34 Mar'kel Cooks, Fr	50 George Schwanenberg, Jr	3 Greg Lemon, Jr

SS
18 Adrian Noorwood, Jr., Sr
35 Jawun Jiles, So
38 Tim McCoy, So

CB
1 Daryl Irby, Sr
26 Robert Hayes Jr., Fr
23 Kyle Covington, Fr

DE	NT	DE
54 Corey Lee, Jr	97 Eric England, So	99 Alex Jenkins, Sr
93 Tyler Colbert, Jr	96 John Williams, So	98 Jawara Beasley, Jr
55 Darrius Montgomery, So	90 Matthew Yarbrough, Fr	⋅

CB
13 Jeilyn Williams, Jr
32 Jamarkese Williams, So
11 Marquis Lawson, Fr

Offense

WR
2 Jordan Hicks, Sr
16 Daryl Brooks, Jr
5 Breylann McCollum, Jr

LT	LG	C	RG	RT
69 Trevor Mason, Sr	64 Roberto Limon, So	53 Matt McCarthy, Sr	57 Devyn Jensen, Jr	61 Draven Taylor, Jr
77 Terence Hickman II, Fr	76 Austin Jennings, Jr	63 Tyler Preston, So	75 Jeremy Jones, Fr	74 Cameron Wilson, Fr
⋅	⋅	72 Brandon Floores, Fr	⋅	⋅

TE
44 Cyril Clarke, Sr
89 John Myers, Fr
⋅

WR
81 Kody Edwards, Jr
22 Jamari Gilbert, Jr
6 Lamont Johnson, So

QB
4 Trent Brittain, Jr
8 Taylor Laird, Jr
12 David Johnson, Fr

RB
25 Broderick Reeves, Sr
10 Junior Sessions, Sr
21 Desmond Hite, Fr

FB
29 John Oglesby, Sr
46 Phillip Higgins, Fr
⋅

Special teams
PK 41 Cody Seidel, So
PK 39 James Liker, Jr
P 36 Oscar Draguicevich, Fr
KR 81 Kody Edwards, Jr
PR 2 Jordan Hicks, Sr
LS 60 Matthew Swanson, Fr
H 85 Anthony Marciano, So

== Postseason honors ==
The following Cardinals received postseason honors for the 2016 season:

All-Southland Conference Second-Team
AP Kody Edwards - Junior
LB Josh Zellars - Senior

All-Southland Conference Honorable Mention
OL Draven Taylor - Junior
PR Jordan Hicks - Senior

== Game summaries ==
=== Texas A&M–Kingsville ===
Texas A&M–Kingsville at Incarnate Word

Team	1	2	3	4	Total
• Javelinas	7	10	7	7	31
Cardinals	7	7	0	8	22

- Date: September 3
- Location: Gayle and Tom Benson Stadium
  San Antonio, TX
- Game start: 6:00 PM CDT
- Elapsed time: 2:59
- Game attendance: 4,400
- Game weather: 95 °F (35 °C) • Wind SE 6 mph (9.7 km/h) • Partly sunny
- Referee: Vidal Jones
- Television network: UIWtv
Sources: Box Score

Scoring summary
1	5:42	Texas A&M–Kingsville	Jordan Thomas 57 yard pass from Myles Carr (Julio De la Garza kick), Drive: 5 plays, 79 yards, 2:46	0–7
1	1:03	Incarnate Word	John Oglesby 2 yard pass from Trent Brittain (Cody Seidel kick), Drive: 9 plays, 45 yards, 4:29	7–7
2	14:19	Texas A&M–Kingsville	Luis Lopez 3 yard run (Julio De la Garza kick), Drive: 5 plays, 57 yards, 1:38	7–14
2	8:48	Incarnate Word	Kody Edwards 83 yard pass from Trent Brittain (Cody Seidel kick), Drive: 3 plays, 93 yards, 1:26	14–14
2	0:00	Texas A&M–Kingsville	Julio De la Garza 23 yard field goal, Drive: 3 plays, 1 yard, 1:05	14–17
3	1:10	Texas A&M–Kingsville	Jordan Thomas 11 yard pass from Myles Carr (Julio De la Garza kick), Drive: 6 plays, 52 yards, 2:06	14–24
4	11:26	Texas A&M–Kingsville	Chris Cooper 2 yard pass from Myles Carr (Julio De la Garza kick), Drive: 5 plays, 70 yards, 2:53	14–31
4	7:38	Incarnate Word	Jordan Hicks 77 yard pass from Trent Brittain (Junior Sessions run for two-point conversion), Drive: 3 plays, 80 yards, 0:57	22–31

=== @ Northwestern State ===
Incarnate Word at Northwestern State

Team	1	2	3	4	Total
• Cardinals	7	7	7	0	21
Demons	3	3	5	7	18

- Date: September 8
- Location: Harry Turpin Stadium
  Natchitoches, LA
- Game start: 6:00 PM CDT
- Elapsed time: 3:22
- Game attendance: 9,120
- Game weather: 96 °F (36 °C) • Wind N 6 mph (9.7 km/h) • Hot and humid
- Referee: Dan Lewis
- Television network: ASN
Sources: Box Score

Scoring summary
1	10:23	Northwestern State	Eric Piccione 38 yard field goal, Drive: 6 plays, 36 yards, 2:27	0–3
1	4:03	Incarnate Word	Junior Sessions 2 yard run (Cody Seidel kick), Drive: 14 plays, 75 yards, 6:20	7–3
2	4:07	Incarnate Word	Kody Edwards 10 yard pass from Trent Brittain (Cody Seidel kick), Drive: 10 plays, 62 yards, 4:08	14–3
2	2:09	Northwestern State	Eric Piccione 47 yard field goal, Drive: 6 plays, 45 yards, 1:58	14–6
3	10:41	Northwestern State	Team Safety, Drive: 3 plays, 1 yard, 1:37	14–8
3	5:08	Northwestern State	Eric Piccione 34 yard field goal, Drive: 11 plays, 48 yards, 5:26	14–11
3	4:03	Incarnate Word	Broderick Reeves 11 yard run (Cody Seidel kick), Drive: 4 plays, 69 yards, 0:58	21–11
4	11:25	Northwestern State	Chris Jones 3 yard run (Eric Piccione kick), Drive: 8 plays, 80 yards, 3:30	21–18

=== @ Nicholls ===
Incarnate Word at Nicholls

Team	1	2	3	4	Total
Cardinals	0	6	0	22	28
• Colonels	14	0	7	14	35

- Date: September 17
- Location: Manning Field at John L. Guidry Stadium
  Thibodaux, LA
- Game start: 3:00 PM CDT
- Elapsed time: 3:22
- Game attendance: 6,283
- Game weather: 83 °F (28 °C) • Wind SSW 4 mph (6.4 km/h) • Overcast
- Referee: Vidal Jones
- TV announcers (NOLA): Ken Berthelot, Wayde Keiser
Sources: Box Score

Scoring summary
1	11:44	Nicholls	Dami Jeanpiere 23 yard pass from Chase Fourcade (David McKey kick), Drive: 8 plays, 70 yards, 2:21	0–7
1	9:41	Nicholls	Dontrel Taylor 3 yard run (David McKey kick), Drive: 2 plays, 40 yards, 0:29	0–14
2	6:44	Incarnate Word	Robert Hayes 76 yard blocked field goal return (Cody Seidel kick blocked), Drive: 6 plays, 39 yards, 2:14	6–14
3	7:24	Nicholls	C.J. Okpalobi 5 yard run (David McKey kick), Drive: 16 plays, 75 yards, 7:36	6–21
4	14:56	Nicholls	C.J. Okpalobi 4 yard run (David McKey kick), Drive: 7 plays, 71 yards, 3:02	6–28
4	14:38	Incarnate Word	Desmond Hite 85 yard run (Breylann McCollum pass), Drive: 1 play, 85 yards, 0:12	14–28
4	11:44	Nicholls	Chris Booker 11 yard pass from Chase Fourcade (David McKey kick), Drive: 6 plays, 35 yards, 2:43	14–35
4	9:23	Incarnate Word	Jamari Gilbert 40 yard pass from Trent Brittain (Cody Seidel kick), Drive: 6 plays, 74 yards, 2:11	21–35
4	4:36	Incarnate Word	Jamari Gilbert 63 yard pass from Trent Brittain (Cody Seidel kick), Drive: 2 plays, 58 yards, 0:43	28–35

=== McNeese State ===
McNeese State at Incarnate Word

Team	1	2	3	4	Total
• #24 Cowboys	14	21	7	0	42
Cardinals	7	7	0	21	35

- Date: September 24
- Location: Gayle and Tom Benson Stadium
  San Antonio, TX
- Game start: 6:00 PM CDT
- Elapsed time: 3:24
- Game attendance: 4,798
- Game weather: 77 °F (25 °C) • Wind NW 8 mph (13 km/h) • Scattered showers
- Referee: Mike Cuttone
- Television network: UIWtv
Sources: Box Score

Scoring summary
1	8:09	Incarnate Word	Jordan Hicks 34 yard pass from Trent Brittain (Cody Seidel kick), Drive: 5 plays, 68 yards, 2:24	7–0
1	4:50	McNeese State	Ryan Ross 5 yard run (Gunnar Raborn kick), Drive: 7 plays, 75 yards, 3:19	7–7
1	3:00	McNeese State	Lawayne Ross 2 yard run (Gunnar Raborn kick), Drive: 2 plays, 39 yards, 0:31	7–14
2	14:48	McNeese State	Dariou Crawley 85 yard pass from James Tabary (Gunnar Raborn kick), Drive: 2 plays, 86 yards, 0:39	7–21
2	5:55	McNeese State	Damon Gladney 2 yard pass from James Tabary (Gunnar Raborn kick), Drive: 7 plays, 59 yards, 3:18	7–28
2	1:16	Incarnate Word	Broderick Reeves 5 yard run (Cody Seidel kick), Drive: 2 plays, 15 yards, 0:32	14–28
2	1:04	McNeese State	Khalil Thomas 97 yard kickoff return (Gunnar Raborn kick)	14–35
3	14:50	McNeese State	Christi Jacobs 22 yard fumble recovery (Gunnar Raborn kick)	14–42
4	12:40	Incarnate Word	Kody Edwards 9 yard pass from Trent Brittain (Cody Seidel kick), Drive: 13 plays, 80 yards, 4:41	21–42
4	6:19	Incarnate Word	Dorland Fields 53 yard run (Cody Seidel kick), Drive: 1 play, 53 yards, 0:09	28–42
4	1:37	Incarnate Word	Trent Brittain 11 yard run (Cody Seidel kick), Drive: 6 plays, 36 yards, 1:53	35–42

=== @ Texas State ===
Incarnate Word at Texas State

Team	1	2	3	4	Total
Cardinals	7	3	0	7	17
• Bobcats	0	21	13	14	48

- Date: October 1
- Location: Bobcat Stadium
  San Marcos, TX
- Game start: 6:30 PM CDT
- Elapsed time: 3:38
- Game attendance: 22,845
- Game weather: 75 °F (24 °C) • Wind ESE 5 mph (8.0 km/h) • Partly Cloudy
- Referee: Jason McArthur
- TV announcers (ESPN3, CW35): Don Harris & Chuck Miketinac
Sources: Box Score

Scoring summary
1	9:36	Incarnate Word	Broderick Reeves 47 yard run (Cody Seidel kick), Drive: 6 plays, 84 yards, 2:44	7–0
2	10:02	Texas State	Gabe Schrade 11 yard pass from Tyler Jones (James Sherman kick), Drive: 9 plays, 55 yards, 2:40	7–7
2	7:13	Texas State	Thurman Morbley 44 yard pass from Tyler Jones (James Sherman kick), Drive: 4 plays, 81 yards, 1:14	7–14
2	3:15	Incarnate Word	Cody Seidel 22 yard field goal, Drive: 11 plays, 70 yards, 3:58	10–14
2	0:15	Texas State	Eric Luna 16 yard pass from Tyler Jones (James Sherman kick), Drive: 12 plays, 79 yards, 2:51	10–21
3	4:43	Texas State	Gabe Schrade 11 yard pass from Tyler Jones (James Sherman kick), Drive: 3 plays, 42 yards, 0:43	10–28
3	0:16	Texas State	Tyler Siudzinski 3 yard run (James Sherman kick blocked), Drive: 8 plays, 63 yards, 3:07	10–34
4	8:06	Incarnate Word	Desmond Hite 71 yard run (Cody Seidel kick), Drive: 4 plays, 81 yards, 2:28	17–34
4	5:04	Texas State	PJ Anderson 46 yard pass from Tyler Jones (James Sherman kick), Drive: 7 plays, 75 yards, 3:02	17–41
4	0:42	Texas State	Brendon Rushing 65 yard pass from Eddie Printz (James Sherman kick), Drive: 2 plays, 75 yards, 1:27	17–48

=== Sam Houston State ===
Sam Houston State at Incarnate Word

Team	1	2	3	4	Total
• #2 Bearkats	21	14	21	7	63
Cardinals	7	14	14	13	48

- Date: October 8
- Location: Gayle and Tom Benson Stadium
  San Antonio, TX
- Game start: 6:00 PM CDT
- Elapsed time: 3:30
- Game attendance: 5,322
- Game weather: 78 °F (26 °C) • Wind 9 mph (14 km/h) • Mostly Sunny
- Referee: Dan Lewis
- Television network: ESPN3, UIWtv
Sources: Box Score

Scoring summary
1	13:54	Sam Houston State	Davion Davis 12 yard pass from Jeremi Briscoe (Luc Swimberghe kick), Drive: 5 plays, 46 yards, 1:06	0–7
1	11:06	Sam Houston State	Corey Avery 54 yard run (Luc Swimberghe kick), Drive: 1 play, 54 yards, 0:09	0–14
1	4:08	Incarnate Word	Kody Edwards 13 yard pass from Trent Brittain (Cody Seidel kick), Drive: 15 plays, 86 yards, 6:51	7–14
1	3:23	Sam Houston State	Davion Davis 80 yard pass from Jeremi Briscoe (Luc Swimberghe kick), Drive: 2 plays, 83 yards, 0:33	7–21
2	11:45	Incarnate Word	Kody Edwards 44 yard pass from Trent Brittain (Cody Seidel kick), Drive: 6 plays, 83 yards, 2:18	14–21
2	3:47	Incarnate Word	Trent Brittain 2 yard run (Cody Seidel kick), Drive: 12 plays, 73 yards, 5:24	21–21
2	2:08	Sam Houston State	Remus Bulmer 4 yard run (Luc Swimberghe kick), Drive: 5 plays, 27 yards, 1:35	21–28
2	0:30	Sam Houston State	Nathan Steward 12 yard pass from Jeremi Briscoe (Luc Swimberghe kick), Drive: 4 plays, 25 yards, 0:26	21–35
3	10:54	Incarnate Word	Jamari Gilbert 26 yard pass from Trent Brittain (Cody Seidel kick), Drive: 10 plays, 65 yards, 4:06	28–35
3	8:13	Sam Houston State	Corey Avery 1 yard run (Luc Swimberghe kick), Drive: 8 plays, 56 yards, 2:33	28–42
3	6:18	Incarnate Word	Broderick Reeves 25 yard run (Cody Seidel kick), Drive: 5 plays, 60 yards, 1:45	35–42
3	4:17	Sam Houston State	Corey Avery 1 yard run (Luc Swimberghe kick), Drive: 5 plays, 67 yards, 1:53	35–49
3	0:00	Sam Houston State	Corey Avery 56 yard run (Luc Swimberghe kick), Drive: 5 plays, 78 yards, 1:54	35–56
4	10:48	Sam Houston State	Tyler Scott 5 yard pass from Jeremi Briscoe (Luc Swimberghe kick), Drive: 5 plays, 60 yards, 2:03	35–63
4	6:13	Incarnate Word	Kody Edwards 43 yard pass from Trent Brittain (Cyril Clarke rush failed), Drive: 8 plays, 75 yards, 4:35	41–63
4	0:48	Incarnate Word	Daryl Brooks 36 yard pass from Taylor Laird (Cody Seidel kick), Drive: 6 plays, 80 yards, 2:53	48–63

=== @ Abilene Christian ===
Incarnate Word at Abilene Christian

Team	1	2	3	4	Total
Cardinals	7	0	14	6	27
• Wildcats	14	24	7	7	52

- Date: October 22
- Location: Shotwell Stadium
  Abilene, TX
- Game start: 2:30 PM CDT
- Elapsed time: 3:22
- Game attendance: 8,957
- Game weather: 76 °F (24 °C) • Wind S 15 mph (24 km/h) • Sunny
- Referee: Ross Smith
Sources: Box Score

Scoring summary
1	12:09	Abilene Christian	De'Andre Brown 11 yard run (Nik Grau kick), Drive: 9 plays, 75 yards, 2:51	0–7
1	09:11	Incarnate Word	Trent Brittain 1 yard run (Cody Seidel kick), Drive: 5 plays, 30 yards, 1:54	7–7
1	06:16	Abilene Christian	Troy Grant 5 yard pass from Dallas Sealey (Nik Grau kick), Drive: 8 plays, 75 yards, 2:55	7–14
2	10:53	Abilene Christian	Adrian Duncan 6 yard pass from Dallas Sealey (Nik Grau kick), Drive: 11 plays, 64 yards, 4:07	7–21
2	02:19	Abilene Christian	Tracy James 9 yard run (Nik Grau kick), Drive: 8 plays, 62 yards, 3:34	7–28
2	01:28	Abilene Christian	Troy Grant 32 yard pass from Dallas Sealey (Nik Grau kick), Drive: 2 plays, 35 yards, 0:40	7–35
2	00:04	Abilene Christian	Nik Grau 44 yard field goal, Drive: 4 plays, 29 yards, 0:56	7–38
3	10:34	Incarnate Word	Trent Brittain 2 yard run (Cody Seidel kick), Drive: 16 plays, 75 yards, 4:26	14–38
3	07:34	Abilene Christian	D.J. Fuller 25 yard pass from Dallas Sealey (Nik Grau kick), Drive: 7 plays, 56 yards, 3:00	14–45
3	02:21	Incarnate Word	Broderick Reeves 3 yard run (Cody Seidel kick), Drive: 4 plays, 25 yards, 0:52	21–45
4	13:10	Abilene Christian	Adrian Duncan 41 yard pass from Dallas Sealey (Nik Grau kick), Drive: 9 plays, 64 yards, 4:02	21–52
4	12:09	Incarnate Word	Jamari Gilbert 16 yard pass from Taylor Laird (Cody Seidel kick blocked), Drive: 5 plays, 70 yards, 1:01	27–52

=== Stephen F. Austin ===
Stephen F. Austin at Incarnate Word

Team	1	2	3	4	Total
• Lumberjacks	0	14	14	14	42
Cardinals	3	0	3	13	19

- Date: October 29
- Location: Gayle and Tom Benson Stadium
  San Antonio, TX
- Game start: 6:00 PM CDT
- Elapsed time: 3:19
- Game attendance: 2,811
- Game weather: 82 °F (28 °C) • Wind SE 5 mph (8.0 km/h) • Warm and Clear
- Referee: Kevin Hassell
- Television network: UIWtv
Sources: Box Score

Scoring summary
1	10:10	Incarnate Word	Cody Seidel 24 yard field goal, Drive: 4 plays, 8 yards, 1:31	3–0
2	12:18	Stephen F. Austin	Zach Conque 4 yard run (Storm Ruiz kick), Drive: 3 plays, 3 yards, 0:49	3–7
2	4:15	Stephen F. Austin	Zach Conque 6 yard run (Storm Ruiz kick), Drive: 7 plays, 54 yards, 1:55	3–14
3	8:09	Incarnate Word	Cody Seidel 19 yard field goal, Drive: 6 plays, 32 yards, 3:09	6–14
3	6:52	Stephen F. Austin	Zach Conque 17 yard run (Storm Ruiz kick), Drive: 4 plays, 34 yards, 1:05	6–21
3	4:57	Stephen F. Austin	De'Quann Ruffin 32 yard pass from Zach Conque (Storm Ruiz kick), Drive: 1 play, 32 yards, 0:08	6–28
4	12:41	Incarnate Word	Junior Sessions 1 yard run (two-point pass conv. failed), Drive: 9 plays, 85 yards, 2:41	12–28
4	11:33	Stephen F. Austin	Trae Hart 53 yard pass from Zach Conque (Storm Ruiz kick), Drive: 4 plays, 71 yards, 1:03	12–35
4	9:54	Stephen F. Austin	Tamrick Pace 40 yard pass from Zach Conque (Storm Ruiz kick), Drive: 2 plays, 44 yards, 0:40	12–42
4	2:31	Incarnate Word	Jordan Hicks 11 yard pass from Taylor Laird (Cody Seidel kick), Drive: 8 plays, 65 yards, 2:21	19–42

=== Southeastern Louisiana ===
Southeastern Louisiana at Incarnate Word

Team	1	2	3	4	Total
• Lions	0	7	10	13	30
Cardinals	3	0	0	7	10

- Date: November 5
- Location: Gayle and Tom Benson Stadium
  San Antonio, TX
- Game start: 2:30 PM CST
- Elapsed time: 2:56
- Game attendance: 5,746
- Game weather: 80 °F (27 °C) • Wind NE 8 mph (13 km/h) • Partly cloudy
- Referee: Vidal Jones
- Television network: UIWtv
Sources: Box Score

Scoring summary
1	3:56	Incarnate Word	Cody Seidel 32 yard field goal, Drive: 11 plays, 76 yards, 4:33	3–0
2	13:44	Southeastern Louisiana	Julius Maracalin 10 yard run (Jonathon Tatum kick), Drive: 3 plays, 68 yards, 1:02	3–7
3	9:08	Southeastern Louisiana	Jonathon Tatum 24 yard field goal, Drive: 12 plays, 52 yards, 4:29	3–10
3	3:20	Southeastern Louisiana	Juwan Dickey 14 yard pass from D'Shaie Landor (Jonathon Tatum kick), Drive: 7 plays, 63 yards, 2:55	3–17
4	14:19	Southeastern Louisiana	Juwan Dickey 16 yard pass from D'Shaie Landor (Jonathon Tatum kick blocked), Drive: 4 plays, 70 yards, 1:23	3–23
4	11:50	Incarnate Word	Kody Edwards 10 yard pass from Trent Brittain (Cody Seidel kick), Drive: 9 plays, 90 yards, 2:19	10–23
4	4:25	Southeastern Louisiana	Juwaan Rogers 8 yard pass from D'Shaie Landor (Jonathon Tatum kick), Drive: 6 plays, 49 yards, 2:50	10–30

=== @ Lamar ===
Incarnate Word at Lamar

Team	1	2	3	4	Total
• Cardinals (UIW)	7	0	14	14	35
Cardinals (LU)	7	0	14	7	28

- Date: November 12
- Location: Provost Umphrey Stadium
  Beaumont, TX
- Game start: 6:00 PM CST
- Elapsed time: 3:51
- Game attendance: 5,566
- Game weather: 69 °F (21 °C) • Clear skies
- Referee: Kevin Boatmann
- Television network: ESPN3
Sources: Box Score

Scoring summary
1	14:46	Lamar	Zae Giles 98 yard kickoff return (Juan Carranco kick), Drive: 0 plays, 0 yards, 0:14	0–7
1	13:49	Incarnate Word	Kody Edwards 65 yard pass from Trent Brittain (Cody Seidel kick), Drive: 2 plays, 69 yards, 0:48	7–7
3	13:11	Lamar	Brendan Langley 90 yard punt return (Juan Carranco kick), Drive: 3 plays, 7 yards, 1:42	7–14
3	8:27	Incarnate Word	Marquis Lawson 35 yard pass from Taylor Laird (Cody Seidel kick), Drive: 4 plays, 67 yards, 1:32	14–14
3	1:49	Incarnate Word	Jordan Hicks 30 yard pass from Trent Brittain (Cody Seidel kick), Drive: 4 plays, 59 yards, 1:41	21–14
3	0:53	Lamar	DeWan Thompson 26 yard pass from Adam Morse (Juan Carranco kick), Drive: 1 play, 26 yards, 0:05	21–21
4	10:08	Lamar	Brendan Langley 75 yard punt return (Juan Carranco kick), Drive: 3 plays, 3 yards, 1:12	21–28
4	6:04	Incarnate Word	Dorland Fields 9 yard run (Cody Seidel kick), Drive: 10 plays, 68 yards, 3:56	28–28
4	2:48	Incarnate Word	Dorland Fields 15 yard run (Cody Seidel kick), Drive: 4 plays, 81 yards, 1:45	35–28

=== Houston Baptist ===
Houston Baptist at Incarnate Word

Team	1	2	3	4	Total
Huskies	0	10	0	16	26
• Cardinals	7	0	14	7	28

- Date: November 19
- Location: Gayle and Tom Benson Stadium
  San Antonio, TX
- Game start: 7:00 PM CST
- Elapsed time: 3:20
- Game attendance: 6,498
- Game weather: 74 °F (23 °C) • Wind SE 12 mph (19 km/h) • Partly cloudy
- Referee: Ross Smith
- Television network: FCSC
Sources: Box Score

Scoring summary
1	10:45	Incarnate Word	Jamari Gilbert 76 yard pass from Trent Brittain (Cody Seidel kick), Drive: 4 plays, 88 yards, 1:42	7–0
2	7:40	Houston Baptist	Alec Chadwick 43 yard field goal, Drive: 4 plays, -3 yards, 1:21	7–7
2	0:33	Houston Baptist	Tony Dawson 2 yard run (Alec Chadwick kick), Drive: 8 plays, 68 yards, 2:17	7–10
3	7:00	Incarnate Word	John Oglesby 4 yard pass from Trent Brittain (Cody Seidel kick), Drive: 8 plays, 53 yards, 3:47	14–10
3	1:49	Incarnate Word	Trent Brittain 1 yard run (Cody Seidel kick), Drive: 12 plays, 53 yards, 4:15	21–10
4	14:49	Houston Baptist	Alec Chadwick 60 yard field goal, Drive: 7 plays, 32 yards, 2:00	21–13
4	6:02	Incarnate Word	Jordan Hicks 14 yard pass from Trent Brittain (Cody Seidel kick), Drive: 18 plays, 75 yards, 8:47	28–13
4	4:55	Houston Baptist	B.J. Kelly 6 yard run (Alec Chadwick kick), Drive: 4 plays, 64 yards, 1:00	28–20
4	2:07	Houston Baptist	Tony Dawson 6 yard run (two-point pass conv. failed), Drive: 7 plays, 56 yards, 2:17	28–26
