= History of Lamar University =

Lamar University is a state university in Beaumont, Texas. Lamar is a Carnegie Doctoral Research University, one of only 27 so designated universities in the United States.

== Founding and Establishment ==
The idea for a public junior college in Beaumont's South Park was formed by Louis R. Pietzsch. Pietzsch had become intensely interested in the junior college movement while enrolled in summer school at the University of Chicago in 1918, and by 1921, was convinced that South Park should have a junior college. Lamar University started on September 17, 1923 as South Park Junior College, operating on the unused third floor of the new South Park High School, with Pietzsch acting as the first president of the college. Approximately 125 students enrolled in 1923 and were taught by 14 teachers. Eight students who had transfer credits graduated in 1924. The city of Beaumont offered Pietzsch the position of city manager in 1924. Carl W. Bingman the Dean of South Park Junior College and Principal of South Park High School became the President of South Park Junior College. Carl W. Bingman was known as "The Skipper" to all who knew him. In the fall of 1924 South Park Junior College had an enrollment of 200 students, and the school boasted an athletic department of football, basketball and track for men and basketball for women. South Park Junior College became the first college in Texas to receive Texas Department of Education approval during the first year of operation, and became fully accredited in 1925. In 1927, commencement speaker, Dr. Frederick Eby, dean of the School of Education at the University of Texas, described South Park College as first among the junior colleges of Texas. By 1928 the school claimed to be the largest junior college in the state of Texas with an enrollment of 280 students. Men's tennis and golf were added to the athletics in 1929. Some of the early clubs at South Park Junior College included: Curtain Club, Pallas Athena Literary Society, and the Patrick Henry debating society. Men's clubs like the Lion's Tamers' and women's clubs like the Famished 13 were added as early as 1924. By 1929, two more men's clubs and another women's club were founded, the Kollege Club and Sons of the Sahara for men and the Rounders for women.

== Lamar College ==
In 1932, recognizing that the junior college was now serving the region, the college held a public contest to rename itself and would award a $100 scholarship to the winner. Otho Plummer a recent graduate was one of 25 to suggest the name Lamar College, after Mirabeau B. Lamar, but he won by virtue of the 100-word essay he wrote in support of the idea. On August 20, 1932 the board voted to change South Park Junior College into Lamar College. In honor of this change head coach and athletic director John E. Gray dropped the old athletic nickname "Brahmas" in favor of "Cardinals." By 1932, no faculty member was scheduled to teach in both the college and high school. The next year, 1933, the separation of the college from South Park High School began with construction of new facilities. These changes occurred during the troubled days of the Great Depression, a time when many institutions faltered, but Lamar continued to grow. College authorities did what they could to help students during this difficult period. In 1938, about half of the students were employed by the college at wages that enabled them to earn all or part of their tuition, fees and textbooks. In 1938, realizing that Lamar College's continued growth would place significant burden on the rest of the South Park School District an enlarged union junior college district was proposed.

A committee of the Young Men's Business League, working closely with officials of Lamar College and the school board of South Park, spearheaded the task of creating a union junior college district. Early plans called for a district comprising the Beaumont, South Park, French, Nederland and Port Neches school districts, but opposition in the latter two districts caused them to be dropped. In an election Sept. 21, 1940, voters approved the creation of a Lamar Union Junior College District, the issuance of bonds to construct an entirely new college facility, a new tax for support and maintenance and the election of trustees to govern the college. A previous decision, in 1938, by the South Park board of trustees to buy a 58-acre tract of land on Port Arthur Highway, just three blocks east of what was then the Lamar campus, predestined the location of Lamar's Campus. The tract was most unattractive, having been used as a tank farm for oil storage, but the Texaco Company was willing to sell it for $18,000. One of the first actions of the Lamar Union Junior College District board of trustees was to purchase this land from the South Park board for cost and fees.

In the 21 months between the election of September 1940 and June 8, the day classes would begin at the new campus, significant changes were undertaken. The newly elected board of trustees secured agreement from the old board to continue operation of the school until June 2, 1941. On that day, although the college still inhabited its original buildings, the new board would take control of operations of Lamar College. Other than the shared facilities, the cord tying Lamar College to the South Park School District had been cut. On June 1, 1942 as the college was moving into its new facilities John E. Gray became president of the college.

By 1942, the college was completely independent of the South Park school district, and operations moved to the current campus.

== Lamar State College of Technology ==
With the end of World War II, an influx of veterans boosted enrollment, and the Lamar board of trustees asked the Texas Legislature to promote Lamar College to a four-year state college. The initial attempt in 1947, led by Texas Representative Jack Brooks failed, but the following year the bill passed both houses. On June 14, 1949, Governor Beauford Jester signed the bill creating Lamar State College of Technology with the new entity to focus on engineering and science, an emphasis that continues today. Present at the bills signing were State Rep. Jack Brooks the bill's author; State Sen W.R. Cousins Jr. - Beaumont; Lt. Governor Allan Shivers - Port Arthur; State Rep. Miller B. Walker - Beaumont, and State Rep. Otis Lee - Port Arthur co-authors. Lamar was the first junior college in Texas to become a four-year institution.

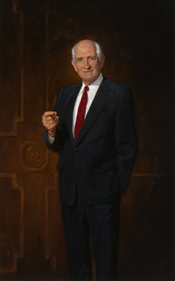
Jack Brooks, Texas legislator responsible for Lamar becoming a 4-year institution

== Desegregation ==
=== Desegregation - 1950s and 1960s ===
==== Efforts to Gain Admission ====
African American veterans of World War II who returned to Southeast Texas found they had no opportunities for postsecondary education or vocational training and chafed over Lamar becoming state supported while it still barred their admission solely on the grounds of race. A group of black leaders calling themselves the Negro Goodwill Council protested to Governor Beauford Jester about the dismal educational inequality in the city and the exclusion of blacks from Lamar State College. They attempted to block passage of the bill to change Lamar into a state-supported senior college, which resulted in John Gray, Lamar's president, creating a black branch of Lamar called Jefferson Junior College. It opened with evening classes at Charlton-Pollard High School. In 1952, James Briscoe, a native Beaumonter and graduate of Charlton-Pollard High School, applied to Lamar. Briscoe's parents were laborers and members of the Beaumont chapter of the NAACP. They courageously supported their son's effort to prove that qualified blacks desired more than junior college offerings and wanted to study in Lamar's new four-year degree programs and avoid the inconvenience of going long distances away from home for a BA degree. Briscoe, a student at Morehouse College in Atlanta since 1950, at the urging of his parents and the Beaumont NAACP, applied to Lamar and was accepted. The admissions office notified him that on the basis of his transcript, he was qualified to enroll for the spring term of 1951. On January 29, when Briscoe went to Lamar with his acceptance letter in hand to register for classes, Lamar's acting president G. A. Wimberly met with Briscoe and explained that a mistake had been made and suggested he apply to TSUN, now named Texas Southern University. State law, he said, created Lamar for whites only. In the summer of 1955, Versie Jackson and Henry Cooper, Jr., became the lead plaintiffs of a class action lawsuit, Jackson v. McDonald, which sought to end Lamar's policy of racial segregation. Lamar Cecil, the federal judge the case came before, ruled on 30 July 1956, that Lamar's “white youth” only admissions policy was unconstitutionality and that September a total of twenty-six blacks were admitted to the college amid violent protests at the campus gates and throughout the region for a number of weeks until Texas Rangers arrived and the rule of law restored.

==== Desegregation of Athletics ====
In 1962, Anthony Guillory blazed the trail for an integrated athletics department at Lamar. Guillory transferred from Nebraska.

== Path to university status ==
Enrollment continued to grow throughout the 1950s and 1960s, reaching 10,000 students. Graduate work was authorized in 1960, when master's degrees were offered in several fields. The enrollment plateaued in the 1970s as the baby boomers generation reached adulthood. In 1969, Lamar State College opened its first branch in Orange, Texas. In 1970, Lamar State College began offering its first doctoral program, the Doctor of Engineering, and in 1971 the college's name was officially changed to Lamar University.

In 1975, the university merged with Port Arthur College in Port Arthur, Texas, creating Lamar University-Port Arthur. In 1983, Senator Carl A. Parker sponsored a bill creating the Lamar University System, and in 1986, Lamar University-Orange and Lamar University-Port Arthur were granted accreditation separate from the main campus. Lamar Institute of Technology was created in 1990 to provide technical, business, health and industrial education through programs two years or fewer in length.

== Recent history ==
In 1995, the Lamar University System was incorporated into the Texas State University System, with the Lamar State College - Orange, Lamar State College - Port Arthur and Lamar Institute of Technology campuses becoming separate entities within the system. In the fall of 1998, the Lamar University faculty numbered 423 and student enrollment was 8,241. Since the reorganization, Lamar University's enrollment has continually increased with enrollment reaching 14,889 students in 2014. Recently numerous construction projects have revitalized or replaced aged buildings and facilities.

== See also ==
- C-SPAN3 videos: Includes video report by Lamar University History Professor, Dr. Robert Robertson of Lamar State College of Technology desegregation as well as desegregation of public parks and golf courses in Beaumont.
- "My grandmother is a warrior" - Integration of Lamar University in Texas: Includes video interview with Versie Jackson, one of the lead plaintiffs in the Jackson v. McDonald class action lawsuit.
