= Lamar University System =

Former public university system in Texas, United States

The Lamar University System was a state university system established in 1983 with four existing institutions: the flagship Lamar University, and the member institutions Lamar State College–Port Arthur, Lamar State College–Orange (both two-year community colleges), and Lamar Institute of Technology.

The System and its member institutions were all named for Mirabeau B. Lamar, second president of the Republic of Texas, called "The Father of Texas Education," who had provided for land allocations in each county for schools, as well as for two universities. But the public school system was not fully established until 1869 under the Reconstruction era legislature, which provided a funding mechanism. The Agricultural and Mechanical College of Texas, presently known as Texas A&M University, was the first statewide college, established in 1876 under the Morrill Act.

The Lamar University System was established by the 68th Session of the Texas Legislature with the passage of SB 620, which took effect in August 1983. On September 1, 1995, the Lamar University System was abolished. Its components became members of the Texas State University System.
