= John E. Gray =

American University president

3rd President of Lamar University
- In office 1942–1952
- Preceded by: Carl W. Bingman
- Succeeded by: F.L. McDonald

7th President of Lamar University
- In office 1972–1976
- Preceded by: Frank Thomas
- Succeeded by: C. Robert Kemble

Personal details
- Born: March 3, 1907 Buckeye, Texas, U.S.
- Died: March 20, 2002 (aged 95) Beaumont, Texas, U.S.
- Education: Lamar University
- Profession: Teacher, administrator, businessman, coach, civic leader

John Ellis Gray (March 3, 1907 – March 20, 2002) was an educational administrator, businessman and university president at Lamar University. In 1972, Gray, along with Otho Plummer, H. C. Galloway, and Dr. Charles P. Turco founded the Lamar University Foundation to fund raise, manage, and administer private gifts in support of Lamar University programs.

In 1973 Gray was inducted into the Cardinal hall of honor.

== Early life ==
Gray was born on March 3, 1907, in Buckeye, Texas, the son of Mr. and Mrs. J. W. Gray. He moved to Beaumont where he graduated from South Park High School in 1923. From 1926 to 1932 Gray coached the South Park High School Greenies; it was during his tenure that the phrase "Greenie Fight Never Dies" was first used. In 1930 John Gray married Mary M. Hahn.

== Education ==
Gray was a member of the first graduating class of South Park Junior College, earning his degree in 1925. In 1936 he earned his B.A. from the University of Texas and in 1938 he earned his M.A. In 1949 he received an honorary doctor of law degree from Centenary College in Shreveport, Louisiana. When Gray began his career as a banker in 1952 he attended Rutgers University and graduated with a graduate degree in 1954. In 1980 Lamar University Regents recognized Gray's meritorious service, awarding him an honorary doctorate of law.

== Banking career ==
In 1952 Gray began a 20-year business and banking career with First National Bank of Beaumont. He served first as vice president and then as president and CEO. At the bank he orchestrated a merger with Security State Bank & Trust Company, thus creating First Security National Bank, the largest financial institution in Beaumont at the time. He was responsible for other important changes like the construction of a new bank building, computerization of bank operations, and creation of a multi-bank holding company, First Security National Corporation. While heading the bank and serving as a director of the Houston branch of the Federal Reserve Bank of Dallas, Gray became a prominent leader in the Southeast Texas region and was a member of numerous civic and professional organizations. He wielded much influence in cultural, educational, political, business, and industrial affairs. He worked to promote the development of refineries and petrochemical plants, ports and waterways, downtown business, hospitals, charities, and Lamar University.

== Lamar ==
At South Park Junior College he coached football and taught mathematics, economics, and government. He became president of Lamar on June 1, 1942. He was president of Lamar College from 1942 through 1951 with time off to serve in the Navy during World War II. He returned in the 1945–46 school year. After the war Gray worked alongside Texas Senator and Lamar Alumnus Jack Brooks to win four-year senior college status for Lamar, a goal that was realized in 1951 with the creation of Lamar State College of Technology. In 1972 Gray retired from First Security National Bank choosing to return to the president's office at Lamar University. During Gray's second term the university celebrated various improvements such as increases in enrollment and scholarships, creation of new bachelor's and master's degree programs, construction of the Mary and John Gray Library, dedication of the Speech and Hearing Center, and the opening of the Mamie McFaddin-Ward Health Science building. Gray left office a second time in 1977. Gray became director of the Brown Center of Lamar University and accepted an appointment by Governor William Clements to a Special Committee on Higher Education Financing. In 1981 Local business and civic leaders honored him with the creation of the John Gray Institute, a Lamar University center for the mutual advancement of business, labor, and industry.
