= Strahan Arena =

Sports venue in San Marcos, Texas, United States

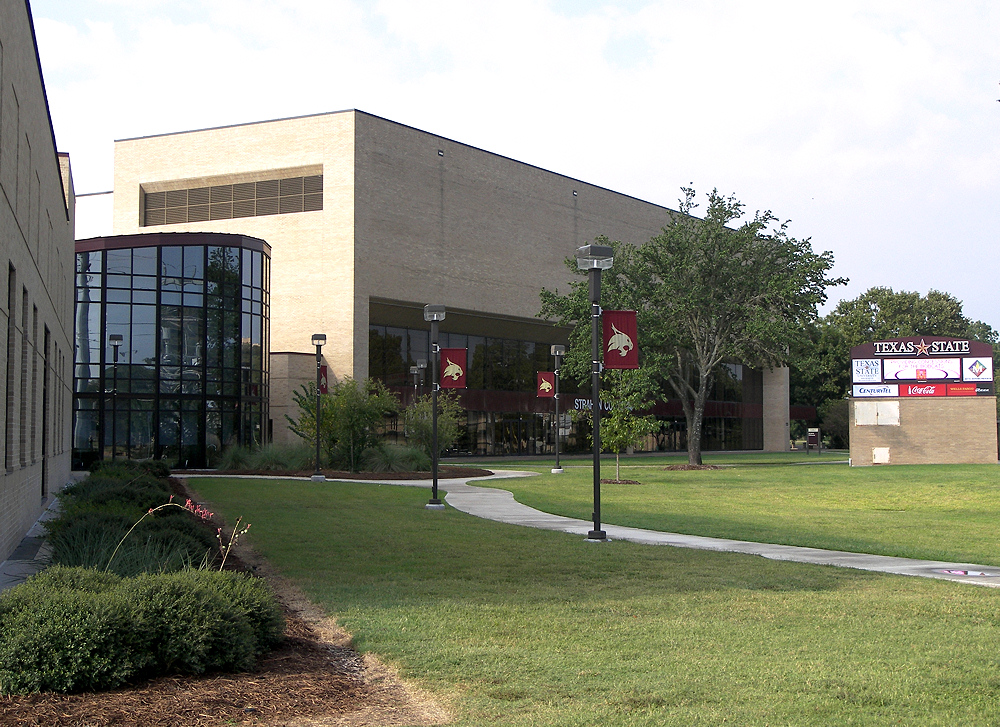
- Interactive map of Strahan Arena
- Location: 601 University Drive; San Marcos, TX 78666
- Coordinates: 29°53′19″N 97°55′58″W
- Owner: Texas State University System
- Operator: Texas State University
- Capacity: 10,000
- Surface: Hardwood

Construction
- Groundbreaking: November 1979
- Opened: October 1982
- Cost: $8.8 million ($29.4 million in 2025 dollars)

Tenant
- Texas State Bobcats

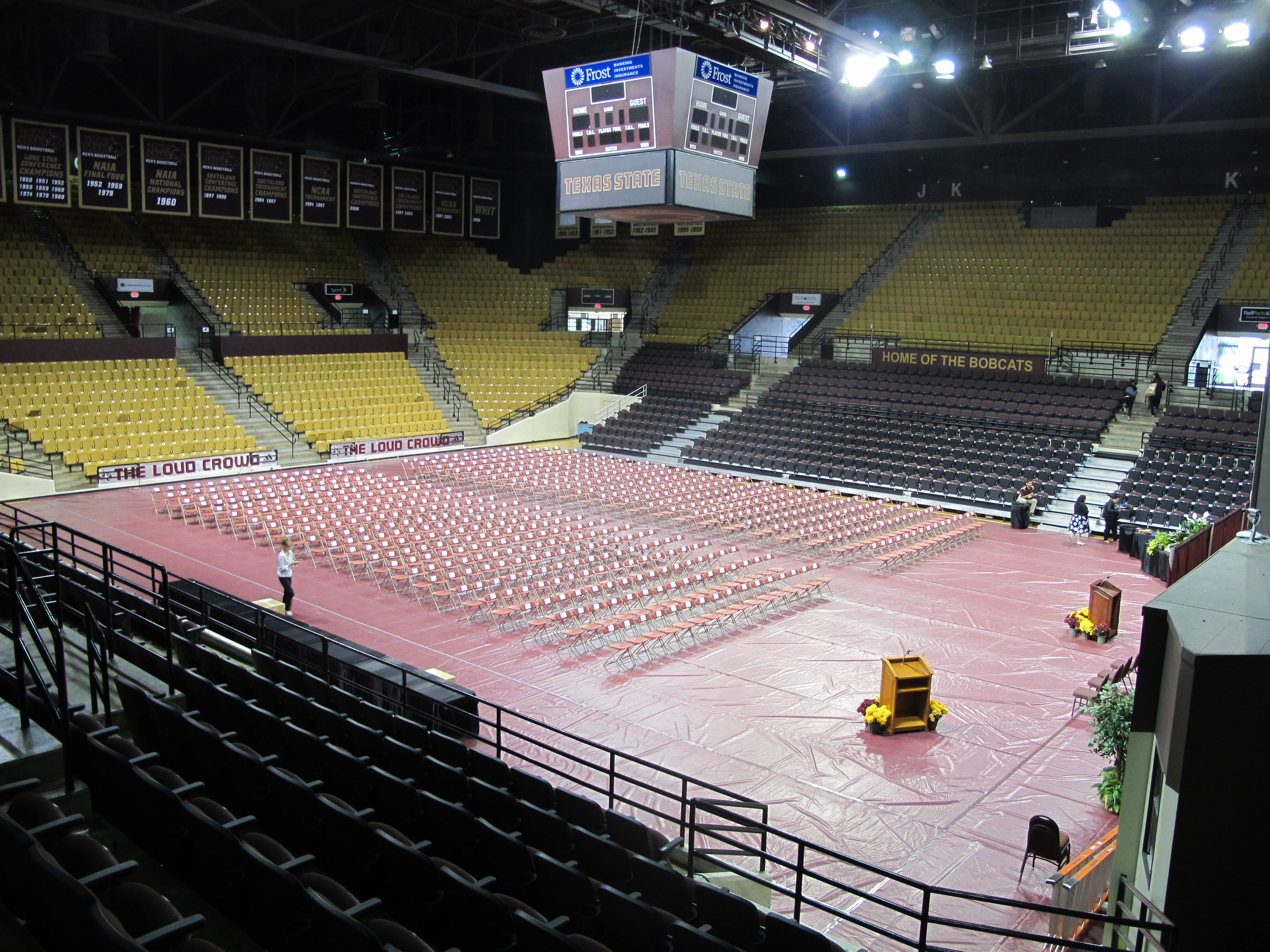
Strahan Coliseum's Interior before 2018 renovation, 2016

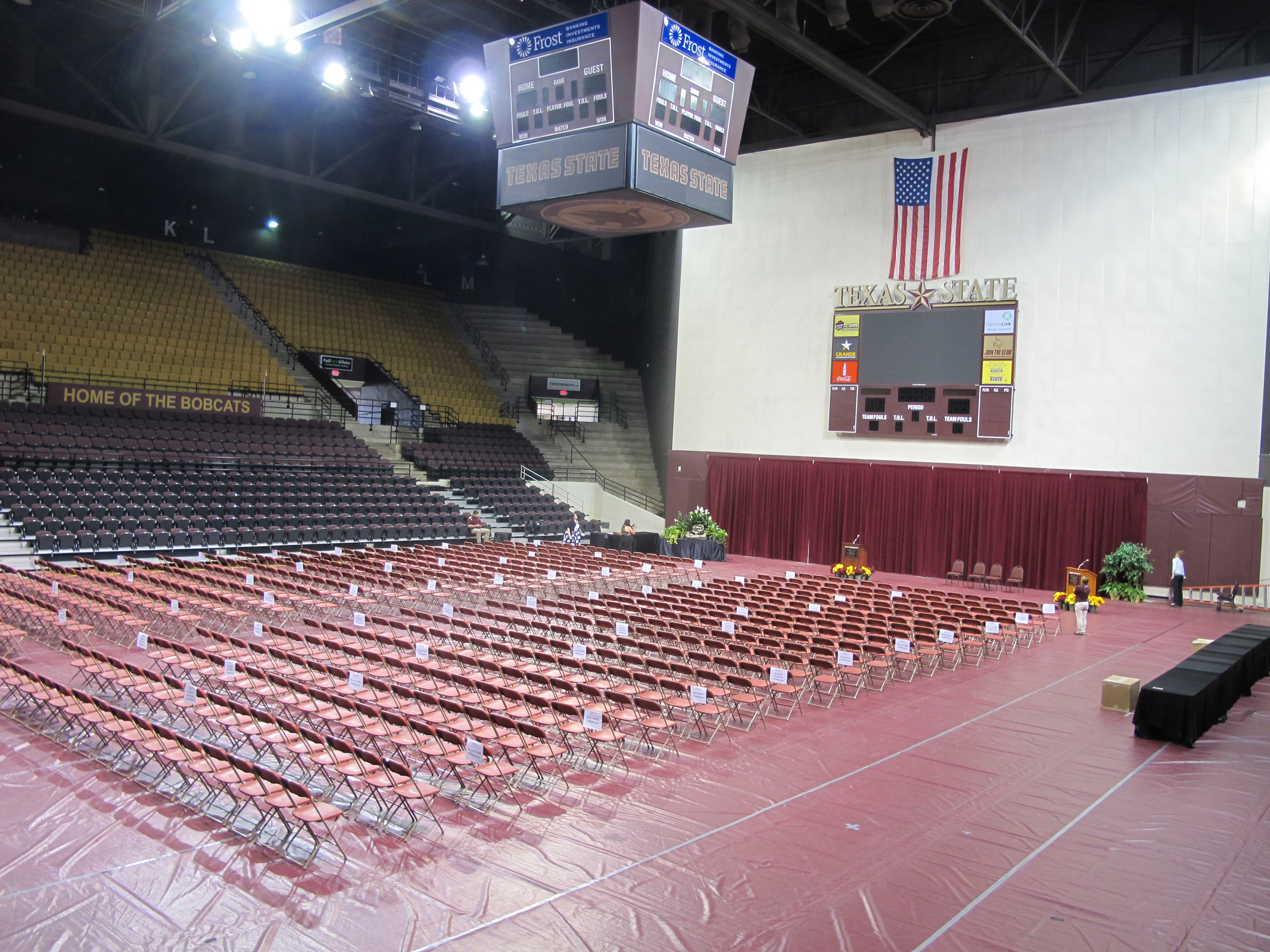
Strahan's Coliseum Stage before 2018 renovation

Strahan Arena is a 10,000-seat multi-purpose arena in San Marcos, Texas. It is an $8.8 million facility built in 1982 and is home to the Texas State University Bobcats men's basketball, women's basketball and women's volleyball teams.

The arena was previously known as Strahan Coliseum, but changed its name to the University Events Center as part of a late 2018 expansion.

On September 15, 2008, the Houston Comets and the Sacramento Monarchs of the WNBA came to play in the Coliseum due to Hurricane Ike canceling the final home game of the regular season for the Houston Comets. The Comets defeated Sacramento 90–81. This would end up being the last game the Comets ever played; they folded after the season ended.

On March 21-22, 2021, the arena hosted six First Round games of the 2021 NCAA Division I women's basketball tournament as part of the relocation of the entire event to San Antonio and surrounding areas due to COVID-19 precautions.

== See also ==
- List of NCAA Division I basketball arenas
