= LSCO =

LSCO can refer to:

- Light sweet crude oil.
- Lanthanum strontium copper oxide, La_{$2-x$}Sr_{$x$}CuO_{4}, a high-temperature superconductor
- Large-scale combat operations
- Lamar State College–Orange
