= Sam Houston State University =

Public university in Huntsville, Texas, US

- Former names: Sam Houston Normal Institute (1879–1923); Sam Houston State Teachers College (1923–1965); Sam Houston State College (1965–1969)
- Motto: "The measure of a Life is its Service"
- Type: Public research university
- Established: April 21, 1879; 147 years ago
- Parent institution: Texas State University System
- Accreditation: SACS
- Endowment: $191 million (FY2024) (SHSU only) $1.41 billion (FY2024) (system-wide)
- Budget: $516 million (FY2026)
- President: Alisa White
- Provost: Sumanth Yenduri
- Faculty: 598
- Students: 21,679
- Location: Huntsville, Texas, United States; 30°42′50″N 95°32′50″W
- Campus: 272 acres (110 ha); Distant Town
- Newspaper: The Houstonian
- Colors: Orange & White
- Nickname: Bearkats
- Sporting affiliations: NCAA Division I FBS – CUSA
- Mascot: Sammy Bearkat
- Website: shsu.edu

Sam Houston State University (Sam Houston, SHSU or Sam) is a public research university in Huntsville, Texas, United States. Founded in 1879, it is the third-oldest public college or university in Texas. It is one of the first normal schools west of the Mississippi River and the first in Texas. The school is named for statesman Sam Houston, who made his home in the city and is buried there.

SHSU is a member of the Texas State University System and has an enrollment of more than 20,000 students across over 80 undergraduate, 59 master's, and 10 doctoral degree programs. It also offers more than 20 online bachelor's and graduate degrees. It is classified among "R2: Doctoral Universities – High research activity".

== History ==
=== 19th and 20th centuries ===
The Sam Houston State University campus was originally home to Austin College, the Presbyterian institution that relocated to Sherman, Texas, in 1876. Austin Hall was constructed in 1851 and is the oldest university building west of the Mississippi still in operation. It was renovated in 2012 and is used today for special meetings and events. Notably, Sam Houston himself attended and participated in the original dedication of the building.

Created by legislation signed by Governor Oran M. Roberts on San Jacinto Day, April 21, 1879, Sam Houston Normal Institute's dedicated goal was to train teachers for the public schools of Texas. It was the first teacher-training school in the southwestern United States. On October 10 of the same year, the first class of 110 students and four faculty commenced instruction. The first president of the school, Bernard Mallon, died eleven days after the institute opened.

The one-room Peabody Memorial Library was the first free-standing campus library in Texas; it was constructed in 1901 with funds provided by the George Peabody Foundation. According to the Normal Institute's catalog, the library was "a very handsome structure, and specially designed for the purpose for which it is to be used. It is said that no school of this kind in the South has a Building equal to it." Fully restored, it is now used as a venue for special university events.

When the university first opened, students received a certification to teach in the state's elementary and secondary schools. After 1919, the university began to award bachelor's degrees. In 1936, the school awarded its first postbaccalaureate degree.

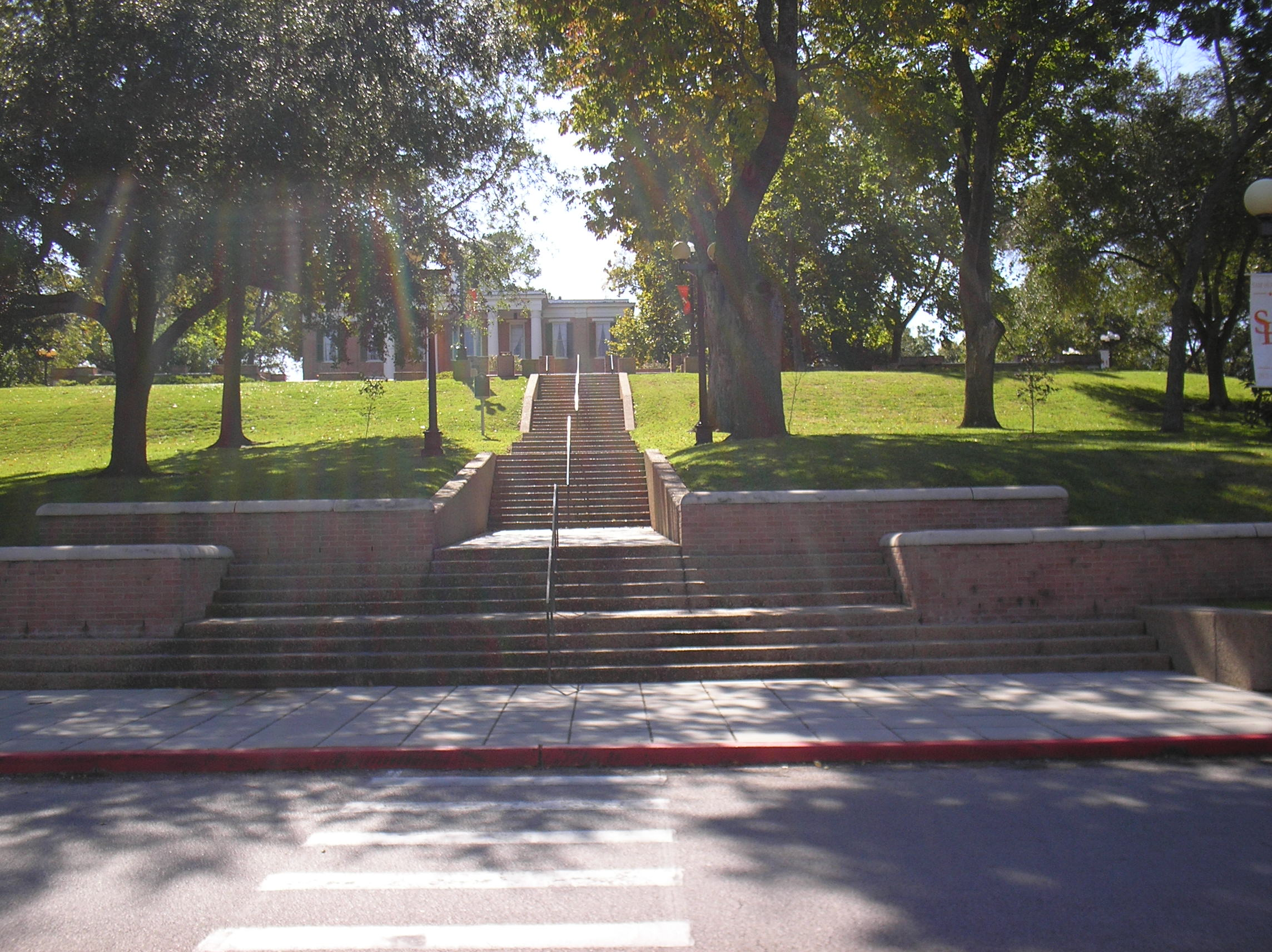
Steps to the Old Main, with a view of Austin Hall

=== 21st century ===
On May 30, 2012, SHSU-The Woodlands Center opened on the Lone Star College-Montgomery campus. The facility includes 144,164 square feet (13,393.3 m^{2}) and has a five-story parking garage. The university also operates SHSU-University Park on the property of Lone Star College-University Park in unincorporated Harris County near Tomball.

=== Name changes ===
Throughout its history, Sam has undergone several name changes:

- 1879 (April 21): founded as Sam Houston Normal Institute
- 1923: Sam Houston State Teachers College
- 1965: Sam Houston State College
- 1969: Sam Houston State University

In April 2007, Texas House Bill 1418 passed without objection in the Texas Legislature, preventing The Texas State University System's Board of Regents from changing the university's name to Texas State – Huntsville.

Contrary to a popular joke—repeated by alumnus Dan Rather in his 1978 autobiography, The Camera Never Blinks—the school was never known as "Sam Houston Institute of Teaching" or "Sam Houston Institute of Technology". This joke was expanded in 2006 into an entire feature film, Accepted, which takes place on the campus of the fictional South Harmon Institute of Technology.

== Main campus ==
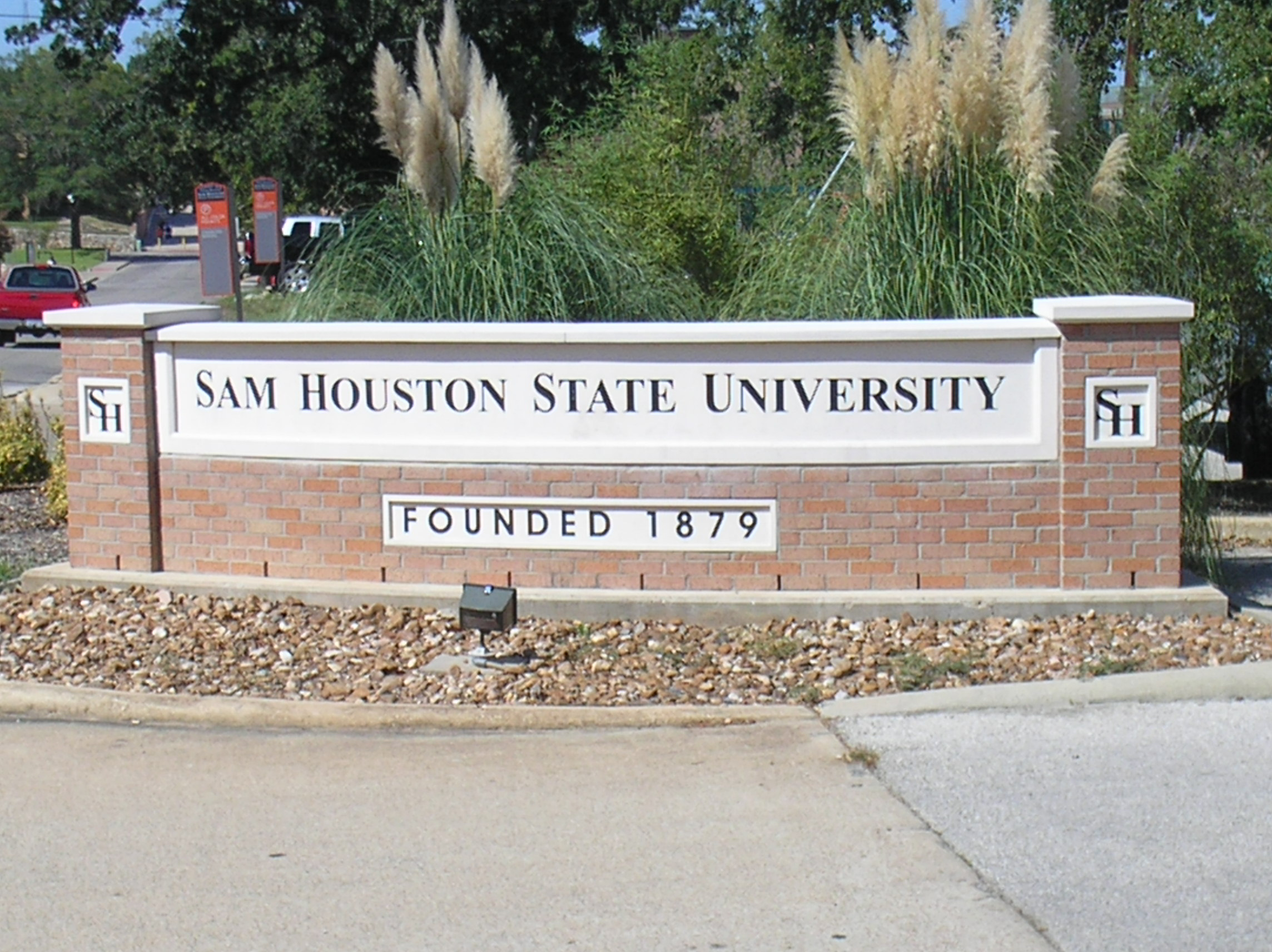
Welcome sign.

The oak-studded rural main campus sits on 316 acres (128 hectares) in central Huntsville. Two large agricultural complexes feature a 1,600-acre (650 ha) teaching and research farm and a rodeo arena. The campus also has a planetarium, an observatory, a body farm, and an 18-hole golf course, The Bearkat Course. The mall area of the main campus includes Blatchley Bell Tower and Clock and a fountain.

The campus stood in for the fictional Austin University in the motion picture The Life of David Gale.

== Academics ==
Academic rankings

National
- Forbes: 421
- U.S. News & World Report: 231 (tie)
- Washington Monthly: 89
- WSJ/College Pulse: 219

Global
- U.S. News & World Report: 2,022 (tie)

Undergraduate demographics as of Fall 2023
Race and ethnicity	Total
White	46%
Hispanic	28%
Black	17%
Two or more races	3%
Asian	2%
American Indian/Alaska Native	1%
International student	1%
Unknown	1%
Economic diversity
Low-income (Note: The percentage of students who received an income-based federal Pell grant intended for low-income students.)	40%
Affluent (Note: The percentage of students who are a part of the American middle class at the bare minimum.)	60%

Sam Houston State's academic departments and programs are organized into nine colleges:

- College of Business Administration
- College of Criminal Justice
- College of Education
- College of Arts and Media
- College of Humanities and Social Sciences
- College of Science & Engineering Technology
- College of Health Sciences
- College of Osteopathic Medicine
- Polytechnic College

Additionally, the university enrolls more than 350 high-achieving undergraduate students in the selective Elliott T. Bowers Honors College.

Programs within the College of Criminal Justice were recently ranked by the Journal of Criminal Justice in the top five nationally. The theater and dance programs were ranked by Dance Spectrum Magazine in the top 25 nationally, and according to the National Dance Association, SHSU is home to a quality athletic dance team. The university offers the only Professional Golf Management program in Texas, one of 17 in the country affiliated with the Professional Golfers' Association of America. SHSU also has one of the oldest speech and debate programs in the nation.

As of May 2016, the university offers:

- Eighty-eight undergraduate degree programs
- Fifty-nine master's programs
- Eight doctoral programs (Clinical Psychology, Counselor Education, Criminal Justice, Developmental Education Administration, Educational Leadership, Forensic Science, Instructional Systems Design & Technology, and Literacy)
- Twenty-one certificates

=== College of Criminal Justice ===
SHSU's College of Criminal Justice is the largest and one of the oldest criminal justice programs in the nation. Huntsville has long been associated with criminal justice, being the co-headquarters of the Texas Department of Criminal Justice and the home of several prisons, including the Texas State Penitentiary, nicknamed the "Walls Unit" which houses the state's execution chamber, located about two blocks north of the campus.

In 1970, the college became one of the first programs in the U.S. to offer a Ph.D. in criminal justice, and it was the first institution in the State of Texas to offer the Master of Science in Forensic Science. SHSU's Ph.D. in Clinical Science with a Forensic emphasis is one of seven such accredited programs in the U.S. The college faculty were recently recognized as the 4th most productive nationally in their field in terms of research, and their areas of expertise range from serial murder, hate crime, and terrorism to policing, law, corrections, and security.

The College of Criminal Justice includes the headquarters of the Texas Forensic Science Commission. It also houses the Bill Blackwood Law Enforcement Management Institute of Texas, which specializes in training for local, state, and federal law enforcement officers in the area of management and supervision. The college also houses a working courtroom where students can observe and analyze real trials.

=== Texas Studies ===
The university has been commended as of late for offering courses that encourage the study of the lore, the lure, and the history of the Lone Star State. In 2012, digital archivists at the university library worked with officials at a local veterans museum to launch the Texas Military Veterans Oral History collection.

== Athletics ==
Sam Houston State's colors are bright orange and white and their nickname is the Bearkats. Sam Houston sports teams participate in the Football Bowl Subdivision (FBS) as a member of Conference USA. The Sam Houston Bearkats won the 2020 NCAA Division I (FCS) Football Championship over South Dakota State by a score of 23–21 and finished with a perfect 10–0 season record. The victory was the first Bearkat football national championship since the team won a share of the 1964 NAIA Championship. The 2020 season marked Sam Houston's third trip to the championship game in ten seasons.

SHSU's athletic teams have been nicknamed "The Bearkats" since 1923 when the university's name was changed by the Texas State Legislature from Sam Houston Normal Institute to Sam Houston State Teachers College. Before 1923, the varsity sports teams were nicknamed "The Normals".

It is doubtful those who coined the "Bearkat" nickname had a particular animal in mind. More likely, the name came from a popular local saying of the time, "tough as a Bearkat!" The late Reed Lindsey, who was a student/athlete in the 1920s and later retired as University registrar, once said that "it was a good fighting name of the time." Since the animal in the saying was thought more mythical than real, the spelling settled upon was "Bearkat". However, there are some arguments that the Sam Houston Bearkat is modeled after either a Binturong or a Kinkajou.

In the late 1940s, then SHSU president Harmon Lowman attempted to change the SHSU mascot from Bearkats to "Ravens" (after General Sam Houston's Cherokee nickname). Mrs. Vernon Schuder reported that the alumni were polled and she voted for the Raven but that "all those old Bearkats beat us out!"

A Sammy Bearkat mascot character began appearing at SHSU sports events in 1959, with the addition of a Samantha character in 1986. Samantha retired in 2005.

=== Rivalries ===
SHSU's primary rival is Stephen F. Austin State University (SFA) and tensions between the two schools can run high before major sporting events that pit one against the other. SHSU and SFA are separated by 90 miles and both schools are located in the Piney Woods. The annual football game between SHSU and SFA named the Battle of the Piney Woods, dates back to 1923. Since 2010, the series has been played at NRG Stadium in Houston. The game was not scheduled for the 2023–24 season after conference changes were announced. SHSU holds a 60-34-2 lead in the series and has won the last 11 meetings.

SHSU is also rivals with Texas State University (formerly SWT). SHSU and TXST have met 92 times, with the Bobcats leading the series 50-37-5. The game was played every year from 1946-2011. SHSU and TXST are members of the TSUS. Both schools formerly competed in the Southland Conference. The schools are scheduled to meet at NRG Stadium in 2024.

=== Mascot ===
Sam Houston's Bearkat is represented by Sammy Bearkat, a costumed mascot, who has entertained and led crowds in cheers during sporting events since 1959.

=== Club sports ===
Club sports are very popular at SHSU. Some available to students include powerlifting, ultimate frisbee, lacrosse, rugby, martial arts, trap and skeet, inline hockey, basketball, volleyball, soccer, tennis, and baseball. In 2013, the Sam Houston quidditch team won the IQA World Cup VI Division II Championship.

The Spirit Programs, cheer, dance, and mascots, of Sam Houston hold the most National titles out of all of the sports and recreational activities at Sam Houston.

== Campus media ==
The SHSU Dept. of Mass Communication operates KSHU, a student-run radio (90.5 FM) and television (cable channel 7) station, broadcasting news, sports, and entertainment programming for the campus and community. "The Houstonian" is the student-published twice-weekly campus newspaper. Broadcast studios and offices for all three media are located within the Dan Rather Communication Building.

The Alcalde was the university's annual yearbook, published from 1910 to 1998 and 2003 to 2006; it was named in honor of Texas Governor Oran Roberts, whose nickname was "The Old Alcalde".

== Affiliated institutions ==
The university operates a charter school network: the administrative offices are on the university grounds in Huntsville, but all of the charter schools are in Greater Houston. The network began in 2017 as laboratory schools. The university chose to use space in daycare facilities to host its charter campuses.

- Brighton Academy (K–6)
- Cypress Trails (K–5)
- Greengate Academy (K–5)
- Spring Woods (K–2) – located at Spring Woods United Methodist Church

== Notable alumni ==
- Dana Andrews, film actor
- Michael Bankston, professional NFL football player
- Fred Beene, professional MLB baseball player
- Ray Benge professional MLB baseball player
- Rhett Bomar, professional NFL football player
- Ken Boswell, professional MLB baseball player
- Jeremiah Briscoe, professional Canadian Football League football player
- Morgan Chesky, journalist
- Katie Rose Clarke, musical theatre actress
- Priscilla Coleman, court artist
- Jerry Coker, jazz educator
- Davion Davis, professional NFL football player
- Keith Davis, professional NFL football player
- Mary DeChambres, film and television picture editor
- Tim Denton, professional NFL football player
- Lachlan Edwards, professional NFL football player
- Ashley Etienne
- John Ferling, author, historian, and professor
- Qua Grant, basketball player in the Israeli Basketball Premier League
- Raquel Rodriguez, professional wrestler
- P. J. Hall, professional NFL football player
- Keith Heinrich, professional NFL football player
- Phil Hennigan, professional MLB baseball player
- Abby Johnson, anti-abortion activist
- Bryce Johnson, professional MLB baseball player
- Matt Langwell, professional MLB baseball player
- Richard Linklater, movie director
- Dustin Long, professional football player
- Marcus Luttrell, U.S. Navy Seal
- Morgan Luttrell, United States Congressman
- Rick Matula, professional MLB baseball player
- Josh McCown, professional NFL football player
- Joel McDonald, voice actor
- Ryan O'Hearn professional MLB baseball player
- Dan Rather, journalist
- Ralph Ruthstrom, professional football player
- Shea Serrano, author
- Allen Shamblin, country music songwriter
- Thaksin Shinawatra, former Thai prime minister
- Caleb Smith, professional baseball player
- Monty Sopp, better known as Billy Gunn, professional wrestler
- Steve Sparks, professional baseball player and broadcaster
- Jordan Tata, professional baseball player
- Ryan Tepera professional baseball player
- Don Welchel, professional baseball player
- Phillip Wellman, professional baseball coach
- Hayden Wesneski, professional baseball player
- Charlie Wilson, U.S. politician
- Dusty Wolfe, professional wrestler and history teacher
- William Garrett Wright, poet
- Cody Johnson, country music singer

== See also ==
- Steamboat House
