= Texas Academy of Leadership in the Humanities =

Location
- 4400 Martin Luther King Parkway; Beaumont, Texas 77710; United States; 30.044016°N 94.070703°W

Information
- Type: Boarding, residential, public, dual enrollment
- Established: 1994
- CEEB code: 440533
- Director: Tilisa Thibodeaux, Ed.D.
- Grades: 11th and 12th
- Enrollment: 50 (2022-2023)
- Campus type: Urban
- Website: www.lamar.edu/texasacademy

The Texas Academy of Leadership in the Humanities (TALH /tæl/) is a residential high school supported by disciplines of the humanities located at Lamar University in Beaumont, Texas. The Academy is one of only two residential programs for gifted and talented high school students recognized by the Texas State Legislature. The other residential program is the Texas Academy of Mathematics and Science. The dual-credit program, established by the Texas Legislature in 1993, allows high school juniors and seniors to attend college level classes in order to complete their high school requirements, while at the same time gaining credits that must be accepted by any Texas public college and are transferable to other universities subject to each university's transfer regulations.

== Housing and classes ==
TALH students are housed in Morris Hall. Students are required to return to the dorms, which have alarmed gates with a security guard on duty at night, by a curfew of 11:00 P.M. on weeknights and midnight on weekends. Students from the academy are fully immersed with the general undergraduate population at Lamar University. Students take a full-time schedule of college classes that must meet the Texas Education Agency (TEA) requirements in addition to the local university's requirements.

== School information ==
The program was created by the 74th Legislature of the State of Texas, then the statue was amended by the 75th Legislature in 1996. The class size is about thirty students with significant fluctuation in the gender ratio. Potential students must meet certain academic qualifications set out by the legislature to be considered for admittance. Prior to 1999, parents and/or guardians were required to pay the full cost of each semester as outlined by Lamar University- Beaumont. Currently, each student receives a scholarship which covers the cost of tuition but is responsible for room, board, and book costs. The students are allowed to live in a section of a dorm set aside for the academy by Lamar University, but it is not required for students to live on campus if they live within 30 miles.

== Student life ==
There are a variety of academy sponsored organizations and activities that take place throughout the year. Students are also allowed to join university sponsored clubs and organizations. However permission from the administration is required for some activities. In addition, all students are required to attend weekly community meetings and perform twelve hours of community service as part of the program. For community service students can start a new project or continue with one already established. Following are some student organizations, activities and community service opportunities.

Academy approved student organizations

- Model United Nations Club
- Journalism Club
- Social Club
- Student Government
- S.T.E.M Club
- Art Club
- Chess Club
- Debate Club
- Med Club

Academy sponsored activities

- Prom
- Various holiday parties
- Peer mentor activities

Past and current community service activities

- Teen court
- ESL/GED tutoring
- Animal shelter
- Habitat for Humanity
- Garth House - Mickey Mehaffy Children's Advocacy Program
- Art Museum of Southeast Texas
- The Art Studio, Inc.
- Charleton-Pollard Elementary
- Spindletop Museum
- Beaumont Baptist Hospital
- Stable Spirit
- Best Years Senior Center
- Lamar University Community Gardens
- Healing Hands
- Lone Star Recycling
- TreePlenish
- D-STEM Engineering Outreach Camp

== Scholarships and extra activities ==
Prior to 1999, parents or guardians were required to pay the full cost of each semester as outlined by Lamar University. Currently, all students attending TALH receive a 100% scholarship for full tuition but must pay the room and board fees of Cardinal Village. Students may qualify for financial aid and other scholarships.

They are also allowed to join any of the clubs and organizations that Lamar University has to offer. Fraternities and sororities are not accepted as clubs, and the students are not allowed to join them. They are also not allowed to participate in Lamar sports. However, band, cheerleading, employment, twirling, and dance team are allowed.

== See also ==
- Texas State University System
- Texas Academy of Mathematics and Science
