= Mary and John Gray Library =

Lamar University library

Coordinates: 30.0423°N 94.0750°W

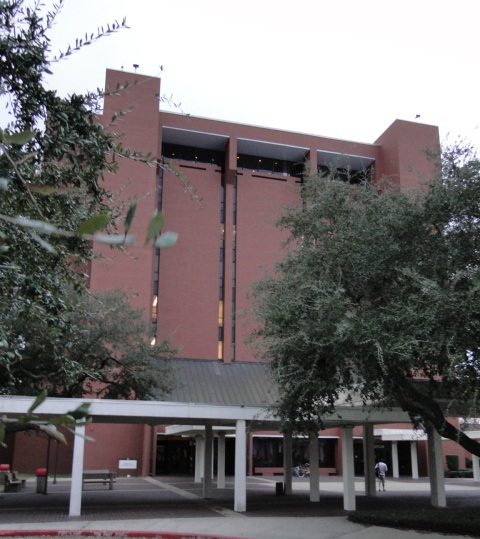
- The 8-story Mary and John Gray Library
- Established: September 17, 1973
- Location: Beaumont, Texas, United States
- Campus: Lamar University
- Website: Mary & John Gray Library

The Mary and John Gray Library is a university library for Lamar University and the Lamar Institute of Technology in Beaumont, Texas. Named in honor of Mary and John Gray, the library serves as the university's primary research and study center. Four floors shelve books and periodicals organized in the Library of Congress Classification. As of July 2026, the library is closed for renovations.

Construction of the library began on September 17, 1973, the 50th anniversary of the school's founding. Those present at the groundbreaking ceremony included the then-Texas Governor Dolph Briscoe as well as Congressman and Lamar alumnus Jack Brooks. The library was officially opened on April 26, 1976.

The library is part of the Federal Depository Library Program, which aims to make government publications accessible for free to the public.

== Renovations ==
On November 22, 2021, the university announced Texas Legislature approval of $44.9 million in capital construction assistance toward expansion and improvements to the library. The planning phase for the three-year project began in 2022.

== Services ==
The 8th floor of the library may serve as a reception center for events. The 7th floor holds an open access computer lab with 120 computers as well as classrooms. A Starbucks coffeehouse is located on the first floor. The center has three rooms: the Lamar Room, named in honor of former Texas President Mirabeau B. Lamar, the Spindletop Room, named in memory of the Spindletop oil discovery in Beaumont, and the Plummer Room, named for previous head librarian Ms. Julia Plummer.

As the primary research reference for the university, the library provides indexes and databases, interlibrary loans, study rooms, and other reference services.

The library can accommodate 850 students between seating areas, the Starbucks, and its 17 study rooms.

== Photos ==
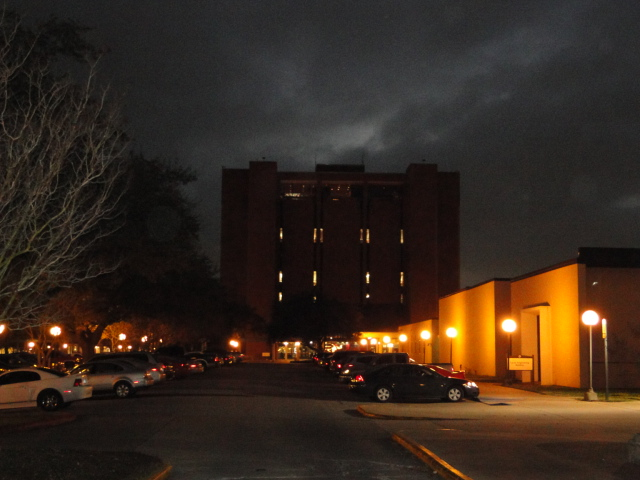
Mary and John Gray Library at night

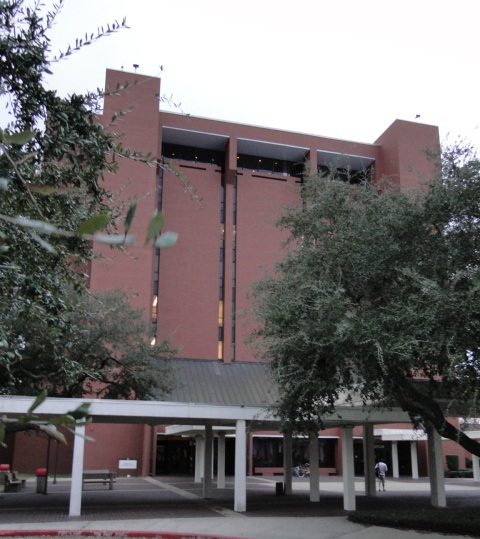
Front facade
