= Sammy Bearkat =

Mascot of Sam Houston State University

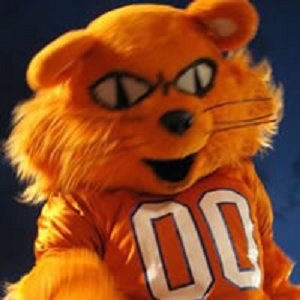
Sammy at a SHSU Football Game

Sammy Bearkat is the mascot of Sam Houston State University (SHSU), located in Huntsville, Texas. He is a popular attraction at many athletic events such as football, basketball, and volleyball. He also appears for various campus and community functions. Sammy's two-minute routine earned him a national championship of the mascots division at the 2005 United Spirit Association Collegiate National Championship. Sammy was also named the 2010 and 2011 National Cheerleading Association (NCA) Mascot National Champion. In the 2012 nationals season, Sammy competed with the SHSU Co-Ed Cheer Team (who made their first appearance ever) at the National Cheerleading Association (NCA) collegiate cheer competition. Together they won first place and earned the title of NCA Division I Cheer National Collegiate Champions. In 2013 Sammy also competed with the SHSU Co-Ed Cheer Team who won their second straight national championship title for NCA. Sammy returned to the Band Shell in Daytona Beach to compete alongside the SHSU All-Girl cheer team who won the NCA All-Girl Division I National Championship Title in 2014. In 2015 Sammy was able to wrap his paws around another NCA Division I title as he competed alongside the Co-Ed Cheer Team. In 2016, Sammy competed alongside the SHSU Division I Co-Ed Cheer Team to win another 1st place NCA National Championship. Sammy was also chosen as the 2016 NCA Mascot National Champion after showcasing a great routine in Daytona Beach, Florida. Sammy has now brought home 1st place in various different flavors in 2005 (USA Mascot Championship), 2010 (NCA Mascot Championship), 2011 (NCA Mascot Championship), 2012 (NCA Division I Co-Ed Championship), 2013 (NCA Division I Co-Ed Championship), 2014 (NCA Division I All-Girl Championship), 2015 (NCA Division I Co-Ed Championship) & 2016 (NCA Mascot Championship & NCA Division I Co-Ed Championship), 2017 (NCA Mascot Championship), 2018 (NCA Division I All-Girl Championship).

== History ==
Sam Houston Normal Institute's athletics teams were originally nicknamed the Normals. When the Texas Legislature changed the name of Sam Houston Normal Institute to Sam Houston State Teachers College, the term “Normal” became outdated.

The settled replacement was Bearkats, though early references spelled the name either "Bearcats," "Bear Cats," or "Bearkats." A bearcat is said by some to be a kinkajou, a small, golden, carnivorous mammal that resides in the jungles of South America. It is doubtful those who coined the "Bearkat" nickname had either a kinkajou or a binturong in mind. However, more likely, the name came from a popular local saying of the time, "Tough as a Bearkat!" Since the animal in the saying was thought more mythical than real, the spelling settled upon was "Bearkat."

In the late 1940s, then SHSU President Harmon Lowman attempted to change the Sam Houston mascot from Bearkats to "Ravens" (after General Sam Houston's Cherokee nickname). Mrs. Vernon Schuder reported that the alumni were polled and she voted for the raven, but that "all those old Bearkats beat us out!"

Three real kinkajous graced the SHSU campus in their role of a live mascot at various times during the 1960s and 1970s.

On December 14, 1959, Sammy began appearing at sporting events and other university functions.

Although many of the former student mascots remain unknown, some of them include:

- Gilbert McEachern (1959-1961, Original Sammy Bearkat)
- Holly Ritter (1980-1981)
- Joe Dacovich (1981-1982)
- Shelley Stogsdill (1982-1983)
- Kim (Henderson) Boudny (1983-1984)
- Cari Ashkar and Sherilan (Youngblood) Young (1984-1985)
- Angelina (Wooten) Santos (1985-1986)
- Johnny Robinson (1985-1986)
- Kelly Cartwright (Plunkett) (1986)
- Crofford "Snooky" Lane (1986-1987)
- Brad Davison (1987-1988)
- Lana Burns (1988-1989)
- Cindy Coe - Samantha Bearkat (1989-1990)
- Ryan Rose (1988-1990); (* in suit on stage to compete at 1989 NCA Cheerleading National Championship (SHSU's first ever National Championship appearance). He was also in the suit on mat to compete at 1990 UCA Mascot National Championship, 2nd Place (SHSU's first ever Mascot Championship appearance) video: 1990 Highlight Reel
- Danet Vrazel - Samantha Bearkat (1990)
- Patricia "Trish" Briscoe (1991-1992)
- Michael Turner (1992)
- Henry "Dale" Chambers, Jr. (1992)
- Chris Gill (1992-1993)
- Bishop Greene (1993)
- Kenny Alexander (1994-1995)
- James Pharaon (1995-1998) (*in suit on mat to compete at UCA Nationals, 10th Place) videos:1995, 1996, 1997
- Mark Barry (1998-1999) (*in suit on mat to compete at UCA Nationals, 5th Place) video: 1998
- Jeremy Hatfield (1999-2000)
- Jon Segura (1999-2000)
- Patrick Gardenier (2000-2006) (*in suit on mat to win 2005 United Spirit Association National Championship) videos:2003, 2004
- Trent Coots (2004-2008)
- Jarrod Leftwich (2005-2010,*in suit on mat to win 2010 National Cheerleading Association Mascot National Championship with a 92.22 score.)
- Thomas Inman (2009-2011,*in suit on mat to win 2011 National Cheerleading Association Mascot National Championship with a 90.00 score.)
- Zane Thrift (2009-2012, *in suit on mat to compete at 2012 NCA Mascot Nationals, 7th place with a 78.89 score.)
- Keith Jennings (2010-2011/2013-2015, *in suit on mat to win 2014 National Cheerleading Association All-Girl Division I Cheer National Championship with a 95.63 score.)
- Julio Poletti (2010-2011)
- Heath Martin (2011-2012)
- Stephanie Chronister (2011-2012)
- Jackson Mayes (2011-2012,*in suit on mat to win 2012 National Cheerleading Association Division I Cheer National Championship with a 96.00 score.)
- Brad Ertl (2012-201, *in suit on mat to win 2013 National Cheerleading Association Division I Cheer National Championship with a 91.78 score & 2016 National Cheerleading Association Division I Cheer National Championship with a 94.98 score)
- Jarid Swope (2014-2018), *in suit on mat to win 2015 National Cheerleading Association Division I Cheer National Championship with a 96.95 score & 2016 National Cheerleading Association Mascot National Championship with a 57.63 score.
- Jason Carson (2015-2017), 2017 Cane Award recipient (video 2017 Award)
- Harrison Teel (2016-2017), *in suit on mat to win 2017 National Cheerleading Association Mascot National Championship with a 58.23 score. 2017 Cane Award recipient
- Amy Gibson (2016-2018), 2017 Cane Award recipient
- Addison Martindale (2016-2019), 2017 Cane Award recipient
- Riley link (2023-2026)

== Samantha Bearkat (1986-2005) ==
In 1986, Samantha Bearkat was introduced as a non-costumed character. In later years Samantha appeared in costume along Sammy. she was "retired" in 2005.

Cindy Coe, who played Samantha from 1989 to 1990 brought a whole new look to Samantha's costume when her Mom custom-made most of Samantha's outfits to include a homecoming dress, old fashioned bikini and other fun fashions. These clothes have since been donated to the Florida Gators mascot team.

== Airkat ==
Airkat, an inflatable costumed version of Sammy, appeared in the mid-2000s.
