= Buckeye, Texas =

Buckeye
- Unincorporated community
- Location in Texas
- Coordinates: 28°53′44″N 96°02′53″W
- Country: United States
- State: Texas
- County: Matagorda
- Time zone: UTC−6 (Central (CST))
  - Summer (DST): UTC−5 (CDT)

Buckeye is an unincorporated community in Matagorda County, Texas, United States, located nine miles southwest of Bay City, the county seat of Matagorda County.

== History ==
J. W. Stoddard and A. A. Plotner, the founders of the Plotner-Stoddard Irrigation Canal Company, who were born in Ohio, decided to name the town after their home state. Water from the Colorado River irrigated 30,000 acres of land. A school for employees' children was established, and a post office opened in 1907. In 1908, train service came to Buckeye (the St. Louis, Brownsville and Mexico).

The town grew to 100 people by 1914. By 1940, there was only one business in town and a population of just 25. (The same census in 990 and 2000). By 1949, the school consolidated with the Tidehaven Independent School District and the post office closed in 1971.
