= Lamar University =

Public university in Beaumont, Texas, US

Coordinates: 30°02′31″N 94°04′30″W

- Former names: South Park Junior College (1923–1932); Lamar College (1932–1949); Lamar State College of Technology (1949–1971)
- Motto: Living the Legacy, Inventing the Future
- Type: Public university
- Established: September 17, 1923; 103 years ago
- Parent institution: TSUS
- Academic affiliations: Space-grant
- Endowment: $182 million (FY2024) (LU only) $1.41 billion (FY2024) (system-wide)
- Budget: $347 million (FY2026)
- President: Jaime R. Taylor
- Faculty: 419 full-time, 157 part-time (fall 2021)
- Students: 18,050 (fall 2025)
- Undergraduates: 8,276
- Postgraduates: 9,774
- Location: Beaumont, Texas, United States
- Campus: Urban, 299 acres (1.21 km^{2})
- Colors: Red and white
- Nickname: Cardinals / Lady Cardinals
- Sporting affiliations: NCAA Division I – Southland Conference
- Mascots: Big Red and LU
- Website: www.lamar.edu

Lamar University (Lamar or LU) is a public university in Beaumont, Texas, United States. Lamar has been a member of the Texas State University System since 1995. It was the flagship institution of the former Lamar University System. As of the fall of 2024, the university enrollment was 17,850 students. Lamar University is accredited by the Southern Association of Colleges and Schools and named for Mirabeau B. Lamar, the second president of the Republic of Texas.

The university campus has an urban setting and the core campus of LU is 299-plus acres. LU is organized into five undergraduate colleges, one graduate college and an honors college.

== History ==
Louis R. Pietzsch founded a public junior college in Beaumont's South Park area at the direction of the South Park School District. Lamar University started on September 17, 1923 as South Park Junior College, operating on the unused third floor of the new South Park High School. Pietzsch acted as the first president of the college. South Park Junior College became the first college in Texas to receive Texas Department of Education approval during the first year of operation and became fully accredited in 1925.

In 1932, the college administration, recognizing that the junior college was serving the region rather than just the community, renamed it Lamar College. It was named for Mirabeau B. Lamar, the second president of the Republic of Texas, who arranged to set aside land in counties for public schools. A statue of him was installed in the quadrangle of the campus near the Setzer Student Center. In 1933, the college was moving toward independence from South Park High School when construction began on new facilities. By 1942, the college was completely independent of the South Park school district, and operations moved to the current campus.

With the end of World War II, an influx of veterans boosted enrollment. The Lamar Board of Trustees asked the Texas Legislature to promote Lamar College to a four-year state college. The initial attempt in 1947 was led in the Texas House of Representatives by Jack Brooks and in the Texas Senate by W. R. Cousins Jr., failed, but the following year the two sponsors again advanced the bill through both houses. On June 14, 1949, Governor Beauford Jester signed the bill creating Lamar State College of Technology.

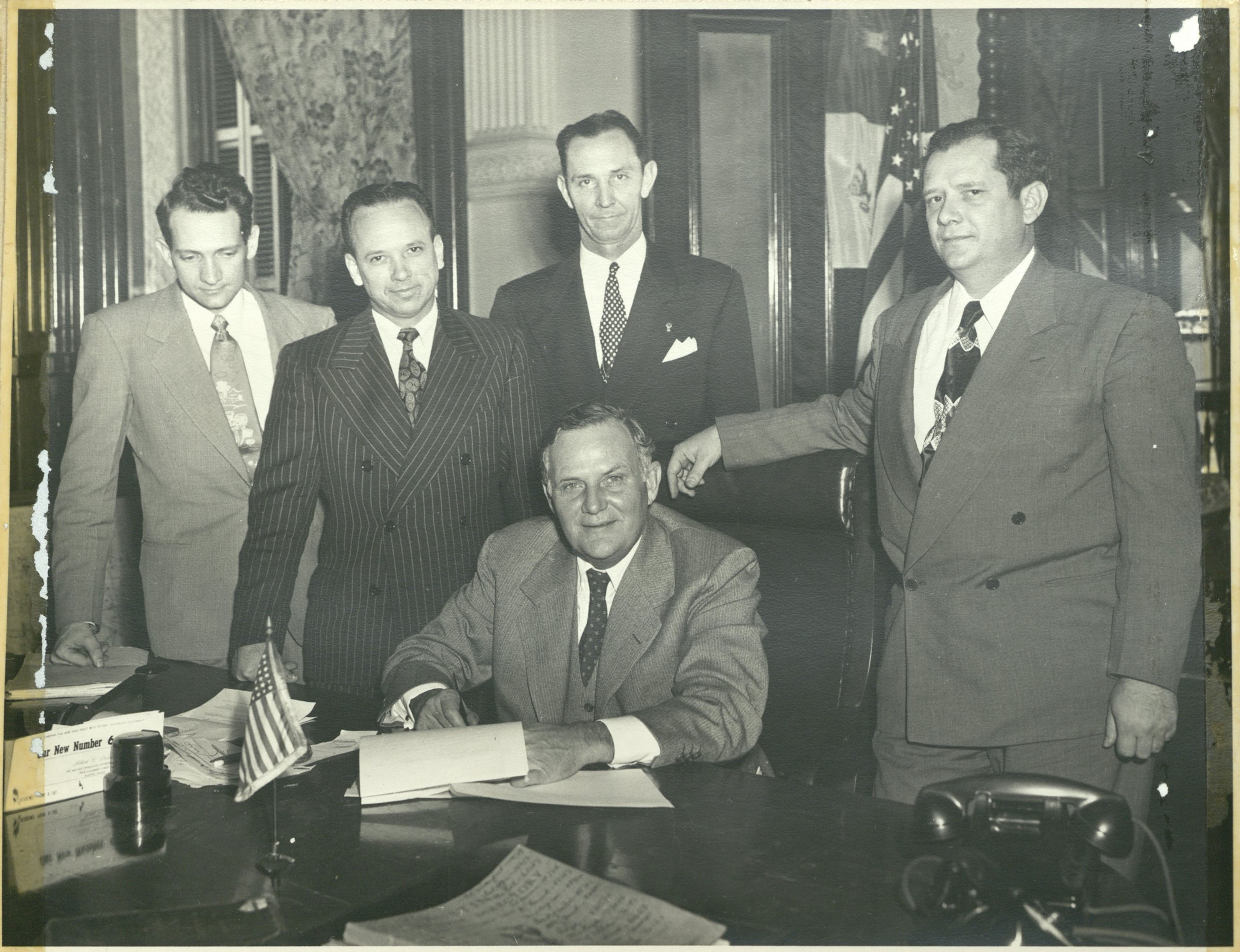
Rep. Jack Brooks is at the far left. Governor Beauford Jester is seated. Sen. W. R. Cousins is on the far right. Austin, Texas.

Enrollment continued to grow throughout the 1950s and 1960s, reaching 10,000 students. Graduate work was authorized in 1960 when master's degrees were offered in several fields. In 1969, Lamar State College opened its first branch at a center in Orange, Texas. In 1970, Lamar State College began offering its first doctoral program, the Doctor of Engineering. In 1971 the college's name was officially changed to Lamar University.

A group of African-American veterans of World War II, barred from admission on the grounds of race and calling themselves the Negro Goodwill Council, protested to Governor Beauford Jester about the exclusion of blacks from Lamar State College. They attempted to block the passage of the bill to change Lamar into a state-supported senior college, which resulted in John Gray, Lamar's president, creating a black branch of Lamar called Jefferson Junior College. It opened with evening classes at Charlton-Pollard High School. In 1952, James Briscoe, a graduate of Charlton-Pollard High School, applied to Lamar. His parents were laborers and members of the Beaumont chapter of the NAACP. The admissions office notified him that based on his transcript, he was qualified to enroll for the spring term of 1951. On January 29, when Briscoe went to register for classes, Lamar's acting president G. A. Wimberly explained that a mistake had been made and suggested he apply to TSUN, now named Texas Southern University. State law, he said, created Lamar for whites only. In the summer of 1955, Versie Jackson and Henry Cooper Jr. became the lead plaintiffs of a class action lawsuit, Jackson v. McDonald, which sought to end Lamar's policy of racial segregation. Lamar Cecil, federal judge, ruled on July 30, 1956, that Lamar's "white youth" only admissions policy was unconstitutional, and that September, a total of twenty-six black students were admitted to the college amid violent protests at the campus gates and throughout the region which continued for several weeks until Texas Rangers arrived and the rule of law was restored.

In 1975, the university merged with Port Arthur College in Port Arthur, Texas, creating Lamar University–Port Arthur. In 1983, state Senator Carl A. Parker sponsored a bill creating the Lamar University System. In 1986, Lamar University–Orange and Lamar University–Port Arthur were granted accreditation separate from the main campus. Lamar Institute of Technology was created in 1990 in Beaumont to provide technical, business, health and industrial education through programs two years or fewer in length.

In 1995, the Lamar University System was incorporated into the Texas State University System. In the fall of 1998, the Lamar University faculty numbered 423 and student enrollment was 8,241. Total enrollment reached 15,000 students in Fall 2012. In the late 1990s, Lamar began undertaking campus improvement projects.

The $19 million center, named the Sheila Umphrey Recreational Sports Center, opened in April 2007.

In August 2007, the university completed construction on Cardinal Village IV, a $16 million expansion of its residence halls. The university completed construction of Cardinal Village Phase V in August 2010 bringing on-campus housing capacity to 2,500 students.

The university, in anticipation of the return of the football program in 2010, renovated and upgraded Provost Umphrey Stadium (formerly Cardinal Stadium) and a new state-of-the-art Dauphin Athletic Complex. In October 2014, Lamar broke ground for an administration building to be named the Wayne A. Reaud Building. The building houses the newly established Reaud Honors College. Another recent project included renovation of the Setzer Student Center. The renovation project had a $28 million cost. The renovated building was opened on April 12, 2018.

== Academics ==
Academic rankings

National
- U.S. News & World Report: 293-381
- Washington Monthly: 356

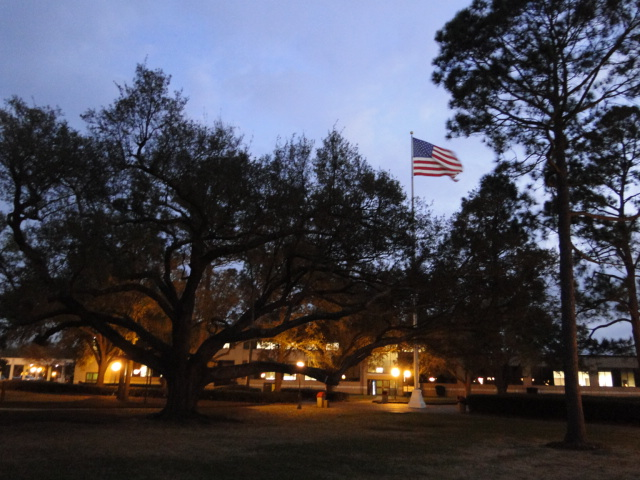
Lucas Building near sunset

Lamar offers 96 undergraduate, 50 master's and eight doctoral degree programs in seven academic colleges. The academic colleges are the College of Engineering, College of Education and Human Development, College of Business, College of Fine Arts and Communication, the College of Arts and Sciences, the College of Graduate Studies, and the Reaud Honors College. Lamar is classified as a Doctoral Research University by the Carnegie Classification of Institutions of Higher Education and is one of only two universities classified as such within the Texas State University System. Lamar and Kunming University of Science and Technology in southwest China have an exchange program that allows Chinese students to attend Lamar for one year while pursuing their bachelor's degree.

The university also has many academic units that fall outside of the five main colleges. The College of Graduate Studies handles graduate students. The Center for Teaching and Learning Enhancement offers training and support to faculty and runs the university's Active and Collaborative Engagement for Students (ACES) Program. The ACES program is designed to provide support to high-risk students and integrate active learning methods into all core courses at LU. The university also provides secondary education through the Texas Academy for Leadership in the Humanities, stateu.com and the Texas Governor's School.

In the summer of 2009, Lamar University partnered with the University of Texas at Arlington to create an online dual credit program for high school students in Texas, stateu.com. The partnership between the two universities operates on the website stateu.com. Online dual credit courses are available for free to high school students through state funding via House Bill 3646.

=== Recognition, awards and ranking ===
Lamar was ranked in Tier Two of "National Universities" by the U.S. News & World Report's 2015 ranking. According to the site, 76.6% of students who applied to Lamar in 2013 were admitted. Lamar is ranked in several 2015 U.S. News & World Report categories. Lamar was ranked #602 in Forbes' 2014 America's Top Colleges report.

=== College of Engineering ===
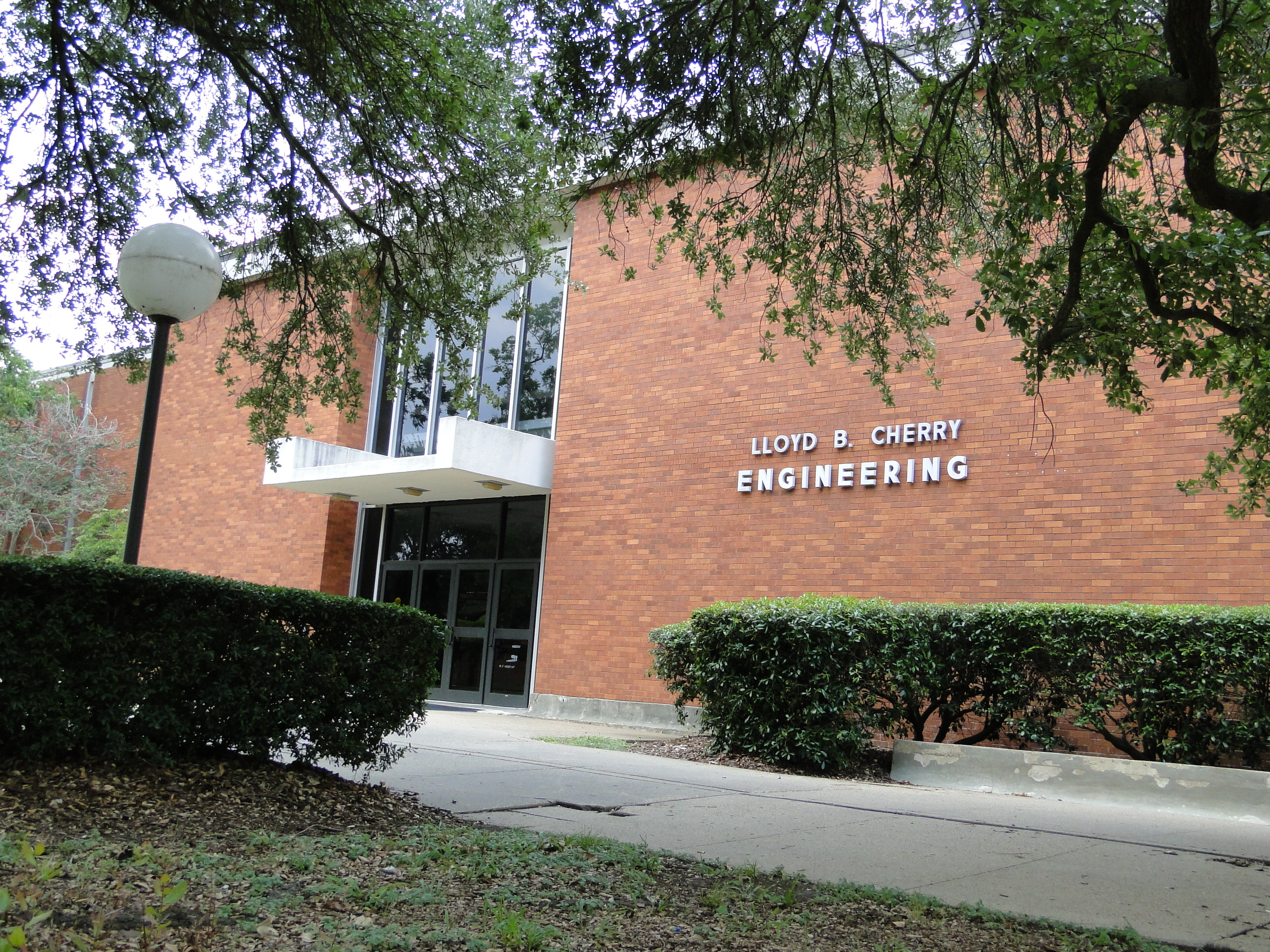
The Cherry building houses the College of Engineering and its faculty and staff.

The College of Engineering consists of five departments, Chemical and Biomolecular Engineering, Civil and Environmental Engineering, Electrical and Computer Engineering, Industrial and Systems Engineering and Mechanical Engineering. Each of these departments offers a bachelors, masters and doctoral degree. The bachelor’s program in each department (except the new computer engineering program) is accredited by the Engineering Accreditation Commission of ABET.

=== College of Business ===
The university established the College of Business in 1972. Before this time, degrees in business and economics were granted by the Division of Business, which was established in 1951, and the School of Business, established in 1954. All undergraduate and graduate degree programs of the College of Business are accredited by AACSB International.

=== College of Education and Human Development ===
The College of Education and Human Development comprises five departments: Educational Leadership, Nutrition, Hospitality & Human Services, Health & Kinesiology, Counseling and Teacher Education.

Lamar is among the largest educator preparation programs for teachers in the nation due to its large Master in Education programs.

=== College of Arts and Sciences ===
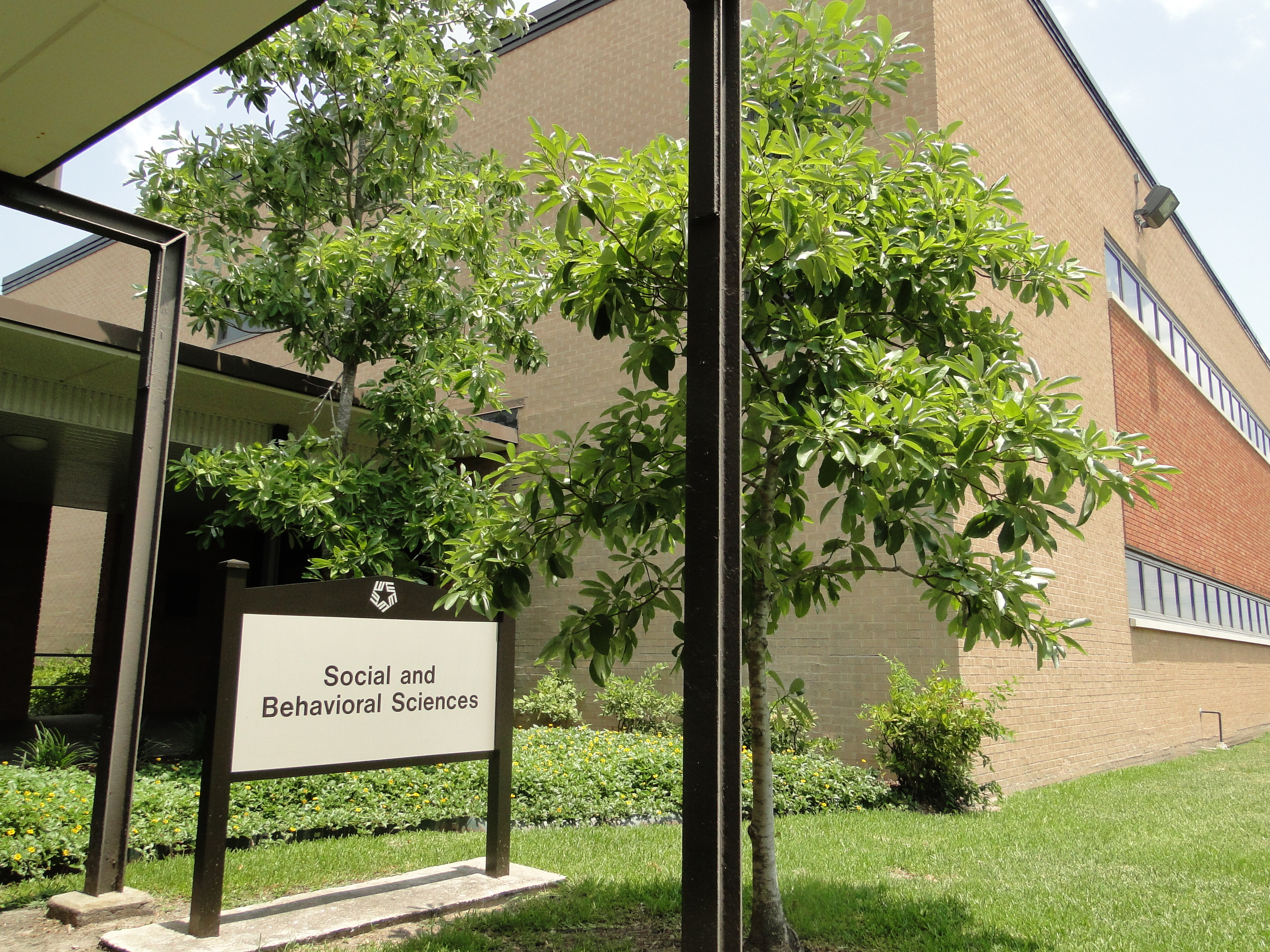
Social and Behavioral Sciences building

The College of Arts and Sciences' fields of study include Physics, Mathematics, Computer Science, Biology, Chemistry, Nursing, Music, English, Earth Science, Foreign Language, History, Political Science, Criminal Justice and Psychology. The College is home to the JoAnne Gay Dishman School of Nursing.

=== College of Fine Arts and Communication ===
The College of Fine Arts and Communication consists of six departments: Art & Design, Communication & Media, Deaf Studies and Deaf Education, Music, Speech and Hearing Sciences, and Theatre and Dance. Lamar University is one of five universities in Texas that offer a clinical doctorate in audiology program. The Department of Communication & Media operates LUTV, a local educational access television station, and KVLU (FM 91.3), a National Public Radio station.

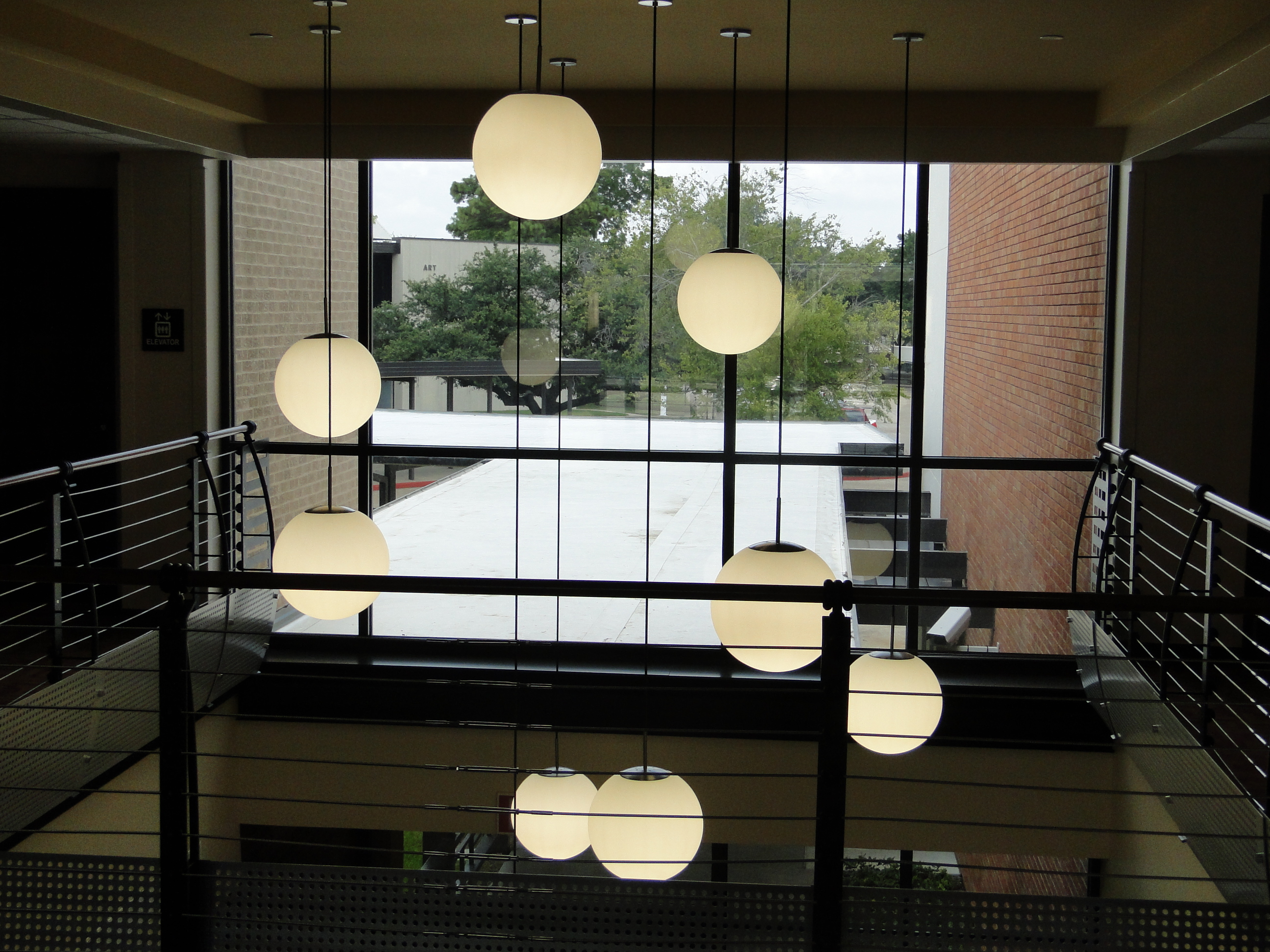

=== Reaud Honors College ===
The Reaud Honors College was established in 2014. The honors program has been part of the university's academic offering since 1963. The honors college is a member of the National Collegiate Honors Council and the Great Plains Honor Council.

== Campus ==
Facilities include the 10,080-seat Montagne Center, the eight-story Mary and John Gray Library, and the 16,000-seat Provost Umphrey Stadium.

=== Mary and John Gray Library ===
The tallest structure on campus at eight stories, the Mary and John Gray Library holds extensive physical and digital collections, including 395,003 physical books, 99,548 e-books and 142 digital databases, and provides access to current journal content from 48,851 journals.

On November 22, 2021, the university announced Texas Legislature approval of $44.9 million in capital construction assistance toward expansion and improvements to the library. The planning phase for the three-year project began in 2022.

=== Sheila Umphrey Recreational Sports Center ===
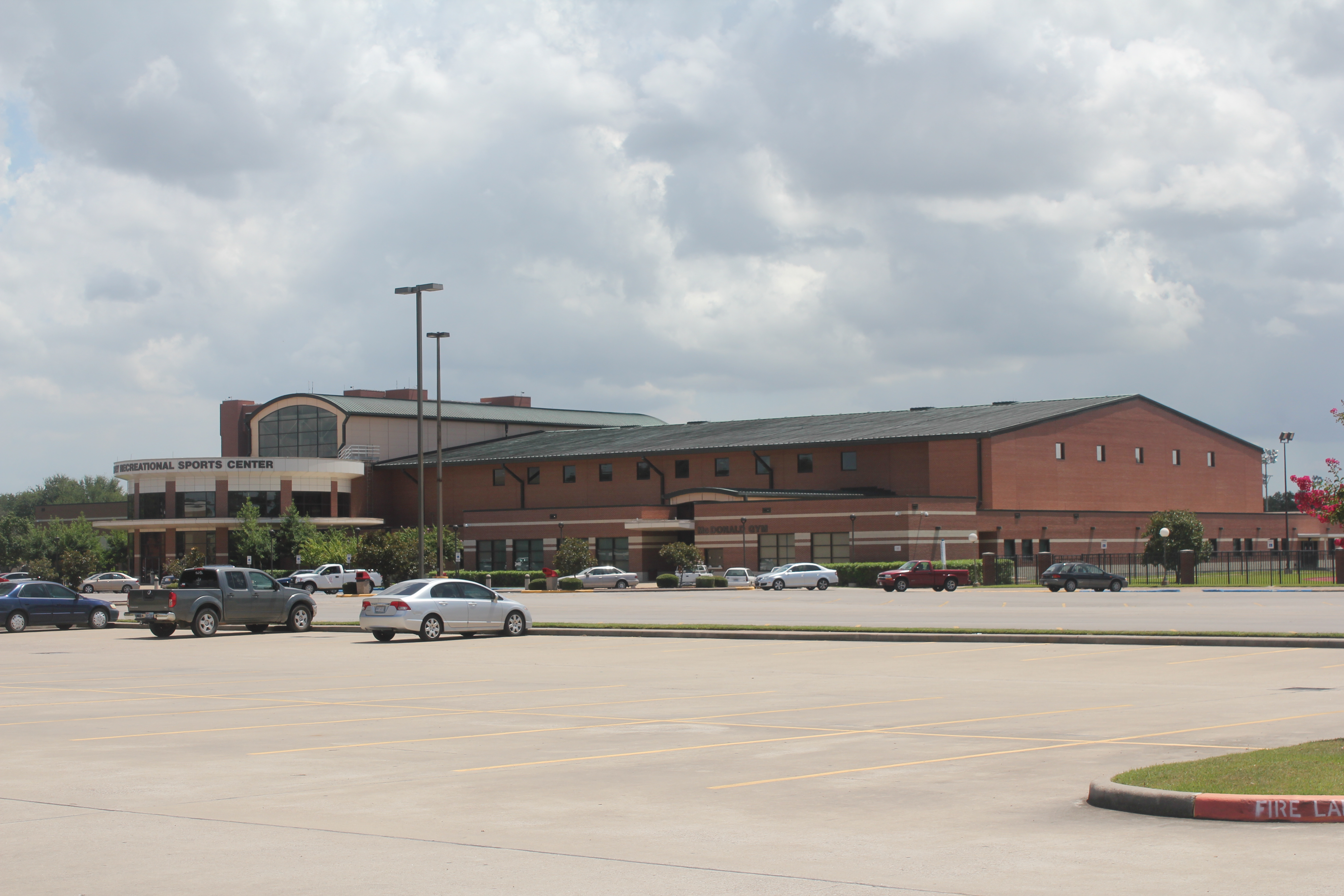
Sheila Umphrey Recreational Sports Center

The Sheila Umphrey Recreational Sports Center was completed for $19 million. The construction included renovation of the McDonald Gym, which had previously served as the university's sports center and home of the volleyball program. The naming of the center was made possible by a $5 million donation by local attorney Walter Umphrey in 2005. The 129,550-square-foot (12,036 m^{2}) center includes a 13,000-square-foot (1,200 m^{2}) cardiovascular room, a one-tenth-mile walking/jogging track, a 43-foot (13 m) climbing wall, basketball, indoor floor hockey/soccer arena, volleyball, badminton courts and racquetball courts. The center also sports a wellness and fitness center, health food café and juice bar. The lounge areas include pool tables, air hockey, foosball and large-screen TV.

=== Setzer Student Center ===
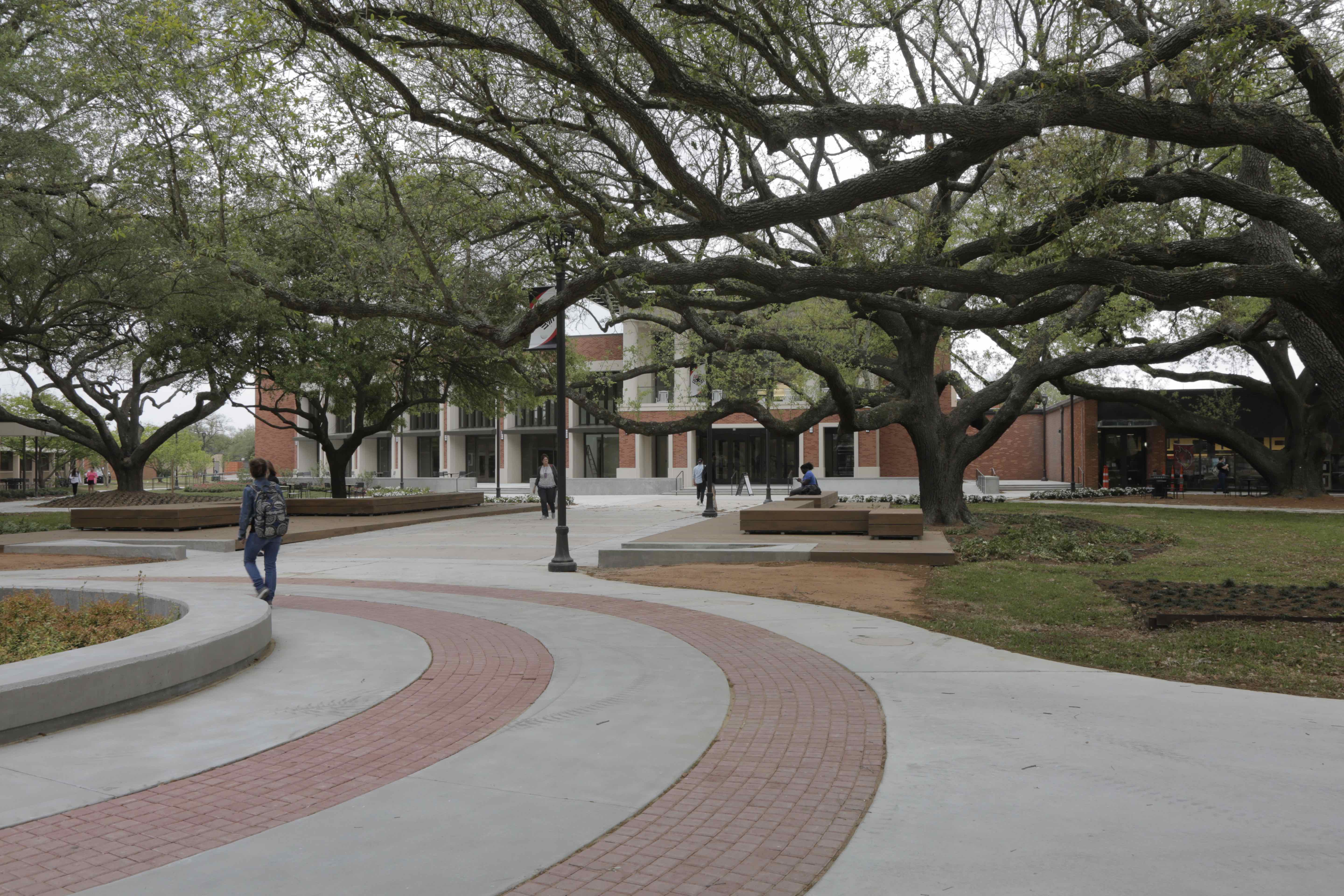
Setzer Student Center

The Setzer Student Center, known colloquially as "The SET", hosts social and cultural activities throughout the year and is the hub for campus student organizations. During the Spring 2012 semester, the Student Government Association, led by then-president Andrew Greenberg, passed a student-wide referendum to finance the renovation and remodeling of the Setzer Student Center. The vote was passed with 81% approval. The $28 million project was completed in 2018 with the reopening of the center on April 12, 2018.

=== Dishman Art Museum ===
The Dishman Art Museum serves as a teaching facility and art museum for Lamar. It was established in 1983. The museum offers students an opportunity to experience diverse styles that reflect international trends, as well as a chance to exhibit their own work. Admission is free. The museum's permanent collection includes 19th- and 20th-century paintings from American and European artists, as well as tribal art from Africa, New Guinea and Pre-Columbian Mexico.

=== Spindletop-Gladys City Museum ===
The Spindletop-Gladys City Museum is an open-air museum commemorating the 1901 discovery of oil by Lucas Gusher in Beaumont.

== Athletics ==
Lamar competes in the Southland Conference in NCAA Division I athletics for all of its varsity sports and at the NCAA Division I (FCS) subdivision level in football. Lamar has participated in practically every level of collegiate athletics from its inception as a junior college in 1923 to its gaining university status in 1971. The men's and women's teams are named the Cardinals and Lady Cardinals, respectively. The "Lamar Cardinals" (or "Cards") refers to the collegiate athletic teams of Lamar University. The inception of the nickname "Cardinals" dates back to the school's name change to Lamar in 1932.

Lamar fields teams in 17 sports sponsored by the Southland Conference. LU sponsors 17 teams (8 men's and 9 women's). The Cardinals participate in men's and women's basketball, men's and women's golf, men's and women's indoor and outdoor track and field, men's and women's cross country, men's and women's tennis, women's soccer, softball, women's volleyball, baseball and football. The newest teams are the reinstated football team beginning in 2010, and women's softball which began play in the 2013 season. A founding member of the Southland Conference, LU has competed in the conference in several stints ranging from 1963 to 1987, 1998 to 2021, and then again beginning in 2022 following a single year in the Western Athletic Conference.

=== Football ===
Under former head coach Larry Kennan, his first team compiled a 6–3–2 record in 1979. LU set all-time attendance records under Kennan by averaging 16,380 fans in 1980. Games against Louisiana Tech (17,600) and Langston University (17,306) rank second and third, respectively, behind the standing-room-only 18,500 Baylor drew for the 1980 opener. The football program's signature win came on September 5, 1981, in Waco with an 18–17 victory over the No. 20 (UPI) Baylor Bears. In 1987 LU football went independent to join the American South Conference, and the program was dropped altogether after 1989.

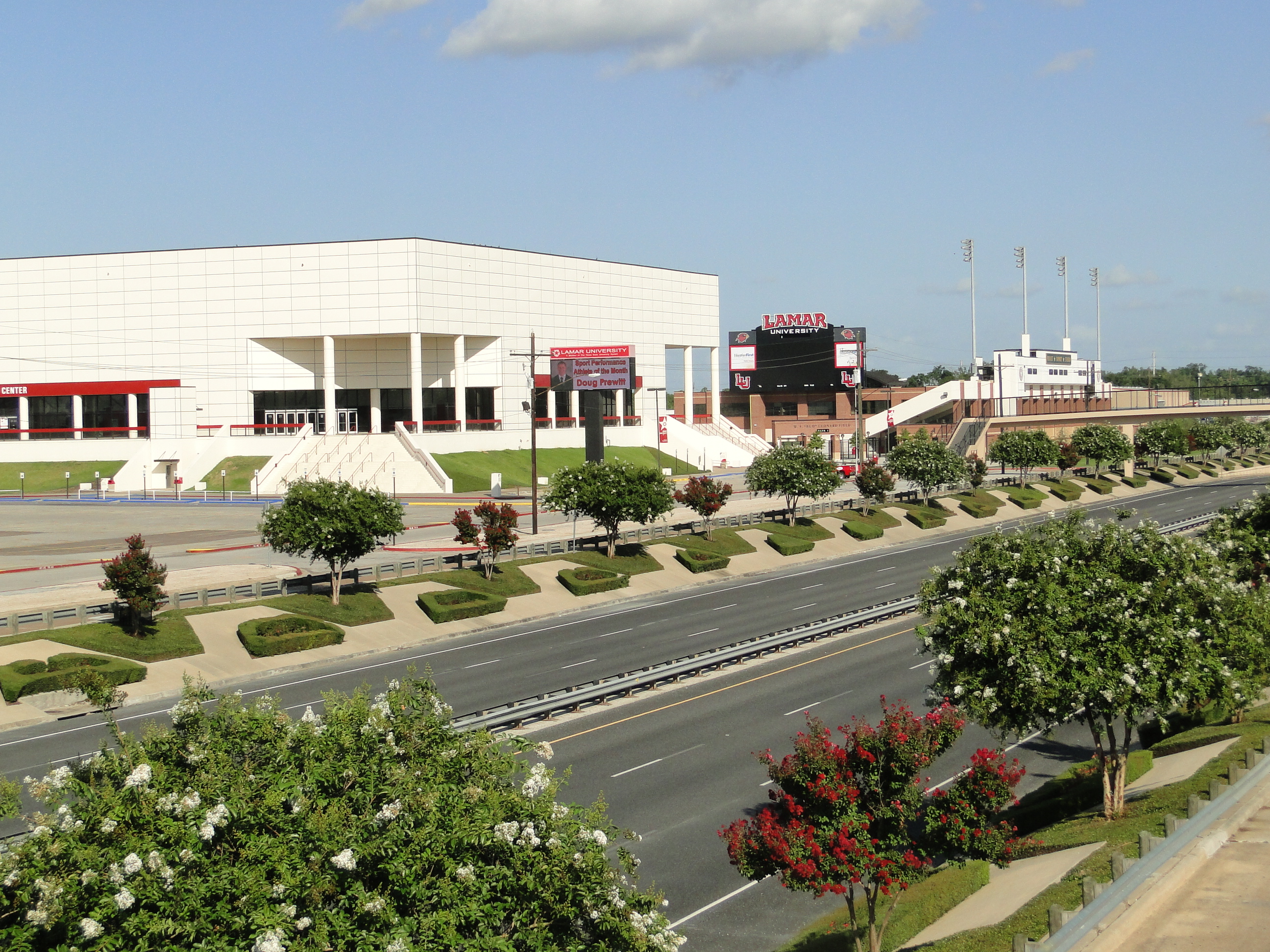
Montagne Center and Provost Umphrey Stadium

On January 30, 2008, 78% of LU students voted to approve the athletics fee required for football's resurrection. This vote set in motion the football team's return for the 2010 season. Regents of The Texas State University System approved the athletics fee to reinstate football at its regular meeting February 20, 2008. On May 19, 2008, Ray Woodard was chosen as head coach for the football program. Aided by a major gift from an anonymous donor, the football field now bears the name W.S. "Bud" Leonard Field, named for a former player and longtime Lamar advocate and regent.

After twenty seasons without a football team, the Lamar University Cardinals returned to the gridiron on September 4, 2010, and compiled a 5–6 record. The Cardinals opened Southland Conference play in 2011. The return of football to Lamar University was in part due to a major donation from Beaumont-based law firm Provost Umphrey. To help renovate the stadium, Walter Umphrey and his wife Sheila also made a personal donation; it is now Provost Umphrey Stadium.

=== Basketball ===
Founded in 1924, the men's and women's basketball teams at Lamar have both advanced deep into the NCAA tournament. The men's team has participated in four NITs and six NCAA tournaments, including four second-round appearances and one sweet 16 appearance. The women's team has participated in four Women's National Invitation Tournaments, two NCAA tournaments including one Elite Eight appearance.

=== Baseball ===
The Lamar Cardinals baseball team represents Lamar University and competes in the Southland Conference at the NCAA Division I level.

== Student life ==
=== Student demographics ===
Undergraduate demographics as of Fall 2023
Race and ethnicity	Total
White	39%
Black	29%
Hispanic	24%
Asian	5%
Two or more races	2%
International student	1%
Unknown	1%
Economic diversity
Low-income (Note: The percentage of students who received an income-based federal Pell grant intended for low-income students.)	45%
Affluent (Note: The percentage of students who are a part of the American middle class at the bare minimum.)	55%

=== Student media ===
==== University Press ====
The University Press, also known as the UP, is the student newspaper of Lamar. The paper was previously known as the S'Park Plug and the Red Bird before becoming the University Press in recognition of Lamar gaining university status in 1971.

==== KVLU ====
91.3 FM KVLU public radio is an NPR affiliate station broadcasting throughout southeast Texas. It is licensed to Lamar University.

==== LUTV ====
LUTV News is the weekly newscast produced by students in the Department of Communication at Lamar University.

==== LUTV Channel 7 ====
Airing on Time Warner Digital Cable channels 0007 and 6.7, LUTV is the official channel of Lamar University and is owned and operated by the Department of Communication and Media.

=== Greeks ===
Lamar boasts 19 national fraternities and sororities. College Panhellenic Council (CPC) is the governing body for the three chapters at LU. National Pan-Hellenic Council (NPHC) governs the eight historically African American fraternities and sororities. The Inter-Fraternity Council (IFC) governs men's fraternities. The Multicultural Greek Council (MGC) governs three multicultural Greek-letter organizations, two sororities and one fraternity.

== Notable people ==
=== Alumni ===
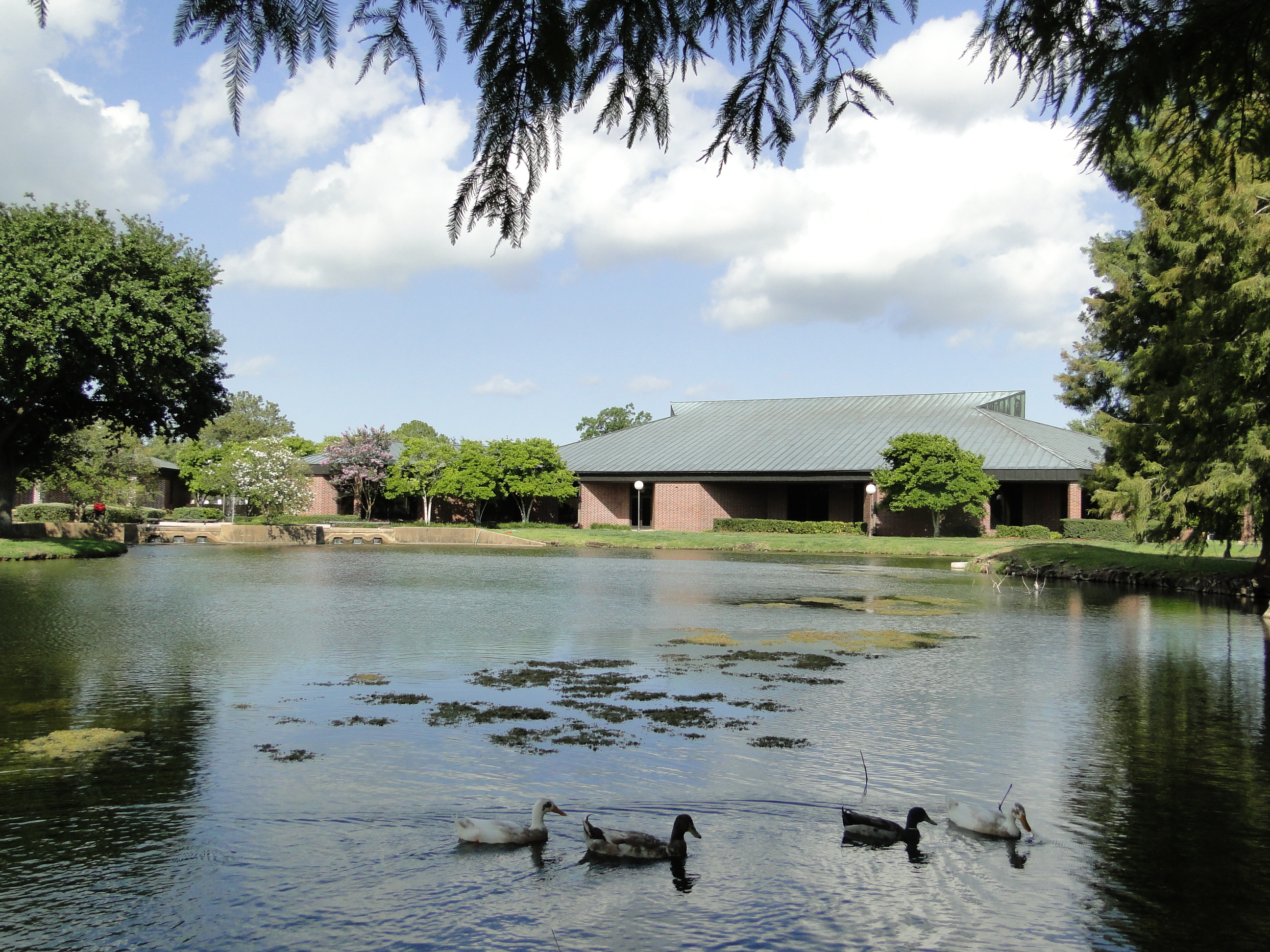
The duck pond at Lamar's John Gray Center, home of alumni affairs

The university has an alumni base numbering over 75,000. Current and former students of Lamar University are referred to as a "Lamar Cardinal", which comes from Lamar's mascot "Big Red", a cardinal. Lamar has the highest median starting and mid-career salary of the four universities in the Texas State University System.

Several Cardinals have gone on to distinguish themselves nationally and internationally in sports, such as PGA Tour golfer Chris Stroud, MLB player Kevin Millar, and college coaches such as Billy Tubbs and Jim Gilligan. Brian Babin, Jack Brooks, Nick Lampson and Elvin Santos have gone on to be national politicians.
