= Lone Star College–University Park =

Public college in Harris County, Texas, US

Coordinates: 29.99268°N 95.58245°W

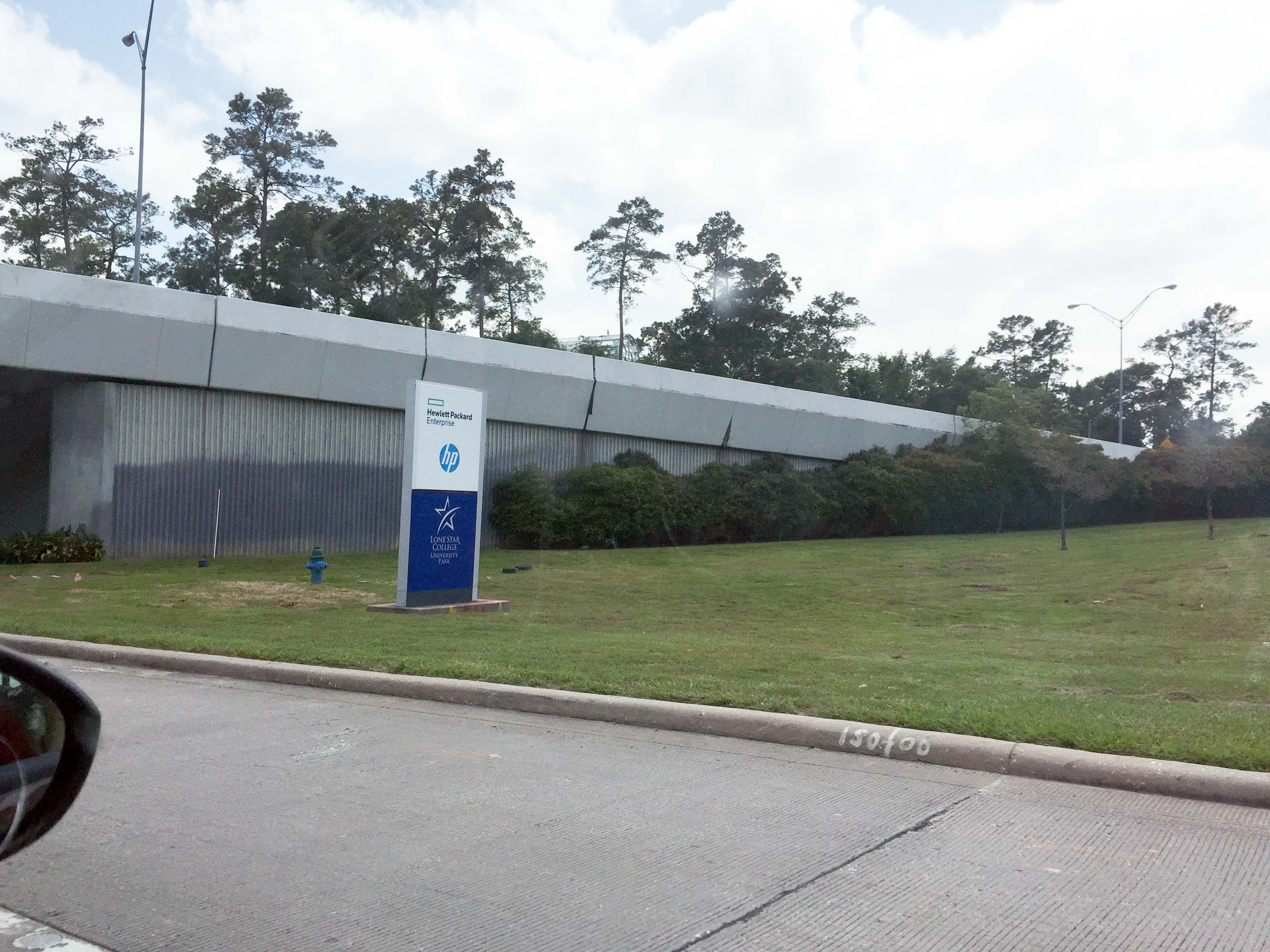
- Campus
- Established: 2010
- Affiliations: Lone Star College System
- President: Matthew Dempsey
- Location: Harris County, Texas, United States
- Nickname: Lions
- Mascot: Leo
- Website: www.lonestar.edu/universitypark

Lone Star College–University Park is one of two university centers in the Lone Star College System located in unincorporated Harris County, Texas, United States.

The campus serves northwest Harris County. The center opened its doors in January 2010 with limited degree programs and courses offered by the University of Houston and the University of Houston–Downtown, both of which are separate and distinct degree-granting institutions. The campus includes a conference center, which will be used for Lone Star Corporate College training and community meetings; a 900-seat, fully equipped cafeteria; and a fitness center.

The campus was originally the world headquarters for Compaq, which was acquired by Hewlett Packard in 2002, and subsequently became the merged company's American headquarters. Lone Star had purchased the facility from Hewlett Packard in 2010. In August 2011 Lone Star College announced that it was demolishing two former HP buildings on the campus, at the intersection of Texas State Highway 249 and Louetta Road. The agency said that it would use implosion rather than traditional wrecking ball demolition. The implosion occurred on September 18, 2011, and the land formerly occupied by the buildings will be used as green space.

In 2018, the University Park campus opened its new $15.4 million Center for Science & Innovation. It was officially dedicated on May 2, 2018. The building is a three-story, 50,000 square feet with 12 science labs, and indoor 3D geology teaching wall, and third floor observation deck, and a "Science HotSpot" Learning Commons.

In 2018, the campus began work on a new $23.7 million building for the performing and visual arts, to be opened in 2019.
