= Texas State University System =

Public university system in Austin, Texas, U.S.

The Texas State University System
- Former names: State Normal School Board of Regents (1911–1923); Board of Regents, State Teachers Colleges (1923–1965); Board of Regents, State Senior Colleges (1965–1975)
- Type: Public university system
- Established: 1911
- Endowment: $1.41 billion (FY2024) (system-wide)
- Budget: $2.11 billion (FY2026)
- Chancellor: Brian McCall
- Students: 95,000 (Fall 2024)
- Location: O. Henry Hall, Austin, Texas, 78701, U.S. 30°16′17.6″N 97°44′22.3″W
- Colors: Charcoal, limestone, gold
- Website: www.tsus.edu

The Texas State University System (TSUS) is a public university system based in Austin, Texas, United States. It was created in 1911 to oversee the state's normal schools. It has since broadened its focus and comprises institutions of many different scopes.

It is the only public university system in the state without a flagship university. The TSUS is composed of four comprehensive universities offering baccalaureate and graduate degrees: Lamar University in Beaumont, Sam Houston State University in Huntsville, Sul Ross State University in Alpine, and Texas State University in San Marcos. The system also includes three two-year colleges offering associate degrees and professional certifications: Lamar Institute of Technology in Beaumont, Lamar State College–Orange in Orange, and Lamar State College–Port Arthur in Port Arthur.

The Texas State University System saw its largest growth in 1995 when the Lamar University System with its four institutions was incorporated into the TSUS.

The Texas State University System is headquartered in Austin. The system is governed by a nine-member Board of Regents appointed by the governor of Texas. The administration is headed by a Board-appointed chancellor based in Austin.

The system owns and manages a 9,269-acre (3,751 ha) property encompassing much of the Christmas Mountains located adjacent to Big Bend National Park in southern Brewster County. The remote tract is regulated under strict conservation easements ensuring preservation in its natural state. The property serves as an open-air classroom for the system's member institutions and a laboratory for their research efforts.

== History ==
The Texas Legislature established the State Normal School Board of Regents in 1911, which would later become the present-day Texas State University System, for the control and management of the state normal schools for white teachers. The board originally assumed authority over North Texas State Normal College (founded 1890), Sam Houston Normal Institute (1879), Southwest Texas Normal School (1899), and West Texas State Normal College (1909).

The Legislature authorized the establishment of Sul Ross Normal College and the purchase of the private East Texas Normal College, founded in 1889, in 1917 That same year, the Legislature authorized the renaming of the system's normal schools to normal colleges. Political struggles for the creation of Stephen F. Austin Normal College and South Texas Normal College (Texas A&M-Kingsville) were resolved in 1921. Further legislation in 1923 renamed the system's members again to state teachers colleges while the board was renamed the Board of Regents, State Teachers Colleges. South Texas left the system in 1929 to be governed independently as Texas Arts and Industrial College (Texas A&I) before eventually joining the Texas A&M University System as Texas A&M-Kingsville.

Sul Ross and West Texas received name changes in 1949 becoming Sul Ross State College and West Texas State College. North Texas would leave the system the same year becoming independently governed North Texas State College. North Texas would later become the flagship campus of the University of North Texas System. Similar name changes would result in Southwest Texas State College in 1959 and Sam Houston State College in 1965. West Texas State College became West Texas State University in 1963.

The year 1965 also saw the incorporation of Angelo State College, founded as a junior college in 1928, into the system. With these changes, the board became titled the Board of Regents, State Senior Colleges. All of the system's components had their names changed from state colleges to state universities in 1969 while East Texas (Texas A&M-Commerce) and West Texas (West Texas A&M) left the system entirely in 1969 to become independent before settling on their present affiliations with the Texas A&M University System. Stephen F. Austin left the system the same year and continued to be an independent with its separate governing regents outside any of the state's other university systems, until 2023, when its regents elected to join the University of Texas System.

Sul Ross established upper-division and post-graduate study centers in 1973 on campuses of Southwest Texas Junior College in Del Rio, Eagle Pass, and Uvalde.

The Legislature conferred upon the system in 1975 its present designation as the Texas State University System. Angelo State University was re-designated as a member along with Sam Houston State University, Southwest Texas State University, and Sul Ross State University.

In the most transformative change to the TSUS in its history, the Lamar University System was abolished in 1995 and its four members were incorporated into the TSUS: Lamar University (founded 1923), Lamar Institute of Technology (1995), Lamar University Orange (1969), and Lamar University Port Arthur (1909).

Southwest Texas State opened an extension center in 1996 housed in temporary buildings adjacent to a Round Rock high school. After a 2004 land donation, the permanent Texas State University Round Rock Campus was opened in 2005.

Sam Houston State opened The Woodlands University Center in 1998. The following year, the former Lamar campuses in Orange and Port Arthur were renamed Lamar State College Orange and Lamar State College Port Arthur.

In 2003, the Legislature changed the name of Southwest Texas State to Texas State University-San Marcos. The name was shortened to Texas State University in 2013.

Angelo State University left the system to affiliate with the Texas Tech University System in 2007 in the most recent change in system membership.

Sam Houston State operated an additional branch, the University Park Campus at Lone Star College–University Park near Tomball from 2011 until it was discontinued at the beginning of 2016.

=== Membership timeline ===
TSUS members Private institution Public independent Lamar University component Lamar System member
North Texas System member Texas A&M System member Texas Tech System member University of Texas System

== Administration ==
The Texas Legislature has delegated administrative power and authority over the Texas State University System to its board of regents including the organization, control, and management of the system and each of its component institutions including employing and discharging the presidents, officers, and other employees of each member institution.

The board consists of nine voting regents, including its chair and vice chairs. Members of the board are appointed by the governor with Senate confirmation to staggered, six-year terms with three regents appointed every two years. In addition, a non-voting student regent is appointed annually. The chair and vice chair are elected by the membership of the board to one-year terms.

The chief executive officer of the university system is the chancellor, who also serves as secretary to the Board of Regents without being a member of the Board. The chancellor is appointed without a fixed term by a majority of the board of regents and serves at the pleasure of the board. The chancellor has ultimate authority and responsibility over all system components including recommending the hiring and firing of the presidents of system institutions, maintaining the permanent records of the system, and advising, assisting, and representing the board in administrative matters.

The current chancellor of the Texas State University System is Brian McCall, a former legislator in the Texas House of Representatives.

The system's administration consists of six offices. One office, the Office of Audits and Analysis, is independent of the chancellor and headed by a director appointed by the regents. The remaining five, Academic and Health Affairs, Finance, General Counsel, Governmental Relations, and Marketing and Communications, are led by vice chancellors under the authority of the system chancellor.

=== Headquarters ===
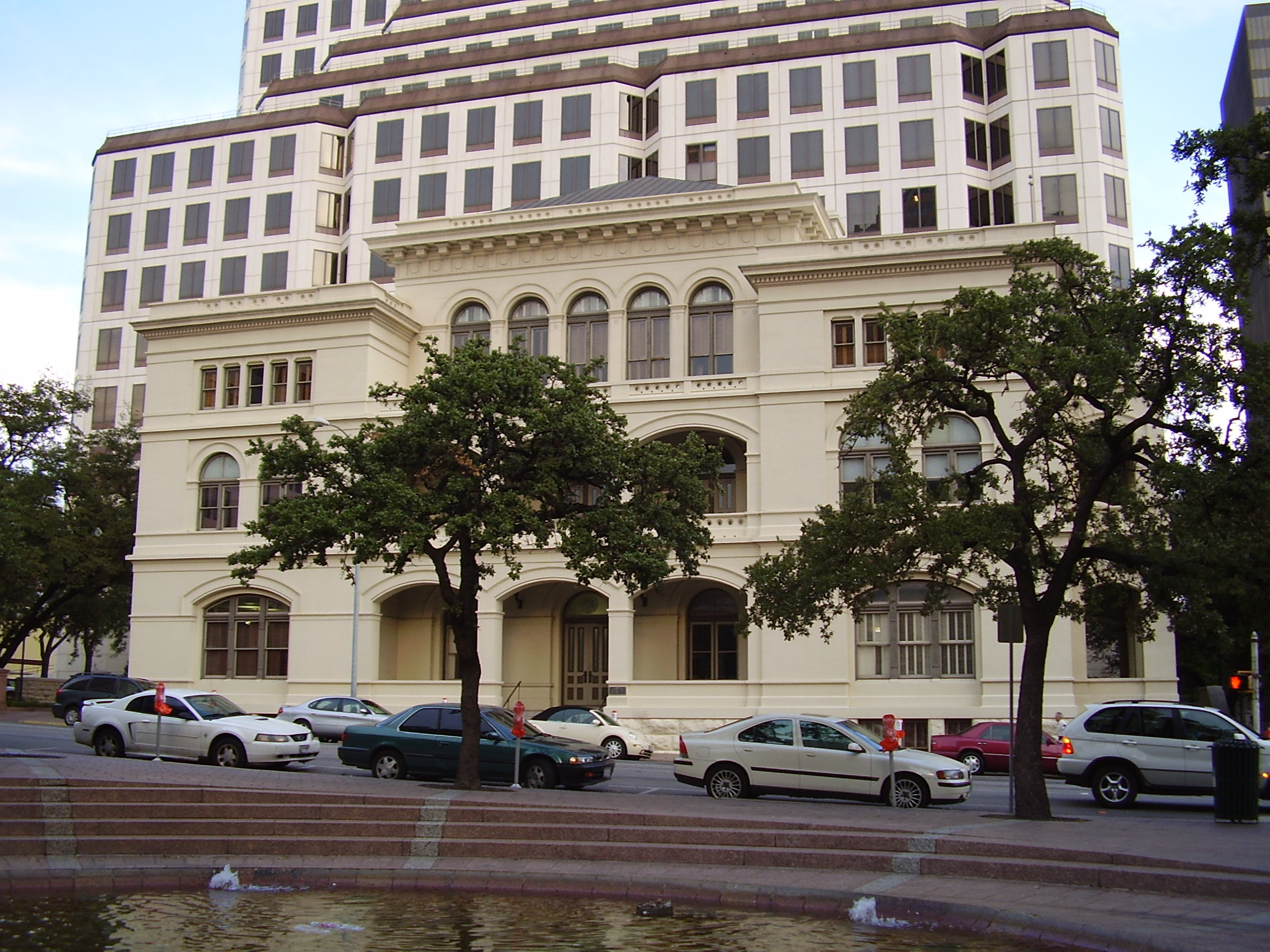
O. Henry Hall, the main administrative building for the system, is in Downtown Austin

O. Henry Hall in Downtown Austin serves as the administrative headquarters of the TSUS. In 2015, system regents approved the acquisition of O. Henry Hall from the University of Texas System. O. Henry Hall is a former U.S. post office and federal building and is listed on the National Register of Historic Places. This was done so that there was a single administrative building for the system. TSUS paid $8.2 million for O. Henry Hall.

The system headquarters was previously in the Thomas J. Rusk State Office Building, 200 East 10th Street, Suite 600, in Downtown Austin, and it occupied space in two other state office buildings in Downtown. In 2015, within those three buildings, TSUS had 24 full-time employees.

== Comparison of present and former component institutions ==
The member institutions of the Texas State University system are separate and distinct institutions, have their own local presidents and administration, confer their own degrees, and establish their own criteria and requirements for admission, subject to approval by the Board of Regents.

=== Universities ===
Current and former universities of the Texas State University System
Current members
Former members

The TSUS does not have a flagship university. All of its comprehensive universities are regarded as stand-alone institutions equal in stature under system administration.

The University of North Texas and West Texas A&M University were founding members of the Texas State University System along with Sam Houston State and Texas State.

Official name	Location (Pop. 2010)	Founded	Joined system	Left system	Present affiliation	Enrollment (Fall 2023)	Endowment (2015)	Nickname	Athletic conference
Current universities
Lamar University	Beaumont; 118,296	1923	1995	Current member		16,721	$106,826,000 (Note: U.S. News & World Report shows Lamar endowment of $20,410,201. According to National Association of College and University Business Officers 2015 study, the endowment is $106,826,000 made up of two endowment funds, Lamar University and Lamar University Foundation, Inc. funds. U.S. News & World Report states that the NACUBO study is a primary source.)	Cardinals	Southland; NCAA Div. I FCS
Sam Houston State University	Huntsville; 38,548	1879	1911	Current member		20,762	$94,419,903	Bearkats	Conference USA; NCAA Div. I FBS
Sul Ross State University	Alpine; 5,905	1917	1917	Current member		2,119 (Note: Enrollment for Sul Ross State University includes 1,465 students at the main Alpine campus and 654 students at Sul Ross Rio Grande College locations)	$17,087,787	Lobos	Lone Star; NCAA Div. II
Texas State University	San Marcos; 44,894	1899	1911	Current member		38,759	$167,116,848	Bobcats	Sun Belt; NCAA Div. I FBS
Former universities
Angelo State University	San Angelo; 93,200	1928	1975	2007	Texas Tech University System	8,452	$158,754,431	Rams	Lone Star; NCAA Div. II
Stephen F. Austin State University	Nacogdoches; 32,996	1921	1921	1969	University of Texas System	12,484	$74,316,267	Lumberjacks	Southland; NCAA Div. I FCS
East Texas A&M University	Commerce; 8,078	1889	1917	1969	Texas A&M University System	12,302	$19,924,955	Lions	Southland; NCAA Div. I FCS
Texas A&M University–Kingsville	Kingsville; 26,213	1921	1921	1929	Texas A&M University System	9,207	$20,803,959	Javelinas	Lone Star; NCAA Div. II
University of North Texas	Denton; 113,383	1890	1911	1949	University of North Texas System	37,175	$131,749,714	Mean Green	American Athletic; NCAA Div. I FBS
West Texas A&M University	Canyon; 13,303	1910	1911	1969	Texas A&M University System	9,482	$73,403,068	Buffaloes	Lone Star; NCAA Div. II

=== State colleges ===
Member two-year colleges of the Texas State University System

All three of the TSUS' two-year institutions offering associate degrees and professional certifications are located in the state's two most southeastern counties, Jefferson and Orange, in the Golden Triangle region where the Gulf Coast meets the Louisiana state line. All were formerly components of the now-defunct Lamar University System before the former system was incorporated into the TSUS. The three institutions, along with LIT's extension center in Silsbee located in Hardin County, are within the Beaumont–Port Arthur metropolitan area.

Official name	Location (Population)	Founded	Joined system	Enrollment Fall 2015	Carnegie classification	Nickname	Athletic conference
Lamar Institute of Technology	Beaumont; 118,296	1990	1995	5,035	Associate's Colleges: High Career & Technical-High Traditional	No intercollegiate athletics	
Lamar State College Orange	Orange; 18,595	1969	1995	3,022	Associate's Colleges: High Career & Technical-High Traditional	No intercollegiate athletics	
Lamar State College Port Arthur	Port Arthur; 53,818	1909	1995	2,988	Special Focus Two-Year: Health Professions	Seahawks	Southwest JCC; NJCAA Div. I

=== Branch campuses and extension centers ===
Branch and extension centers of the Texas State University System
Lamar Institute of Technology branch
Sam Houston State University branch
Sul Ross State University branches
Texas State University branch

Branch locations of the system's comprehensive universities only offer upper-division (junior and senior) undergraduate and graduate coursework.

- Lamar Institute of Technology extension center in Silsbee, Texas at the Frank Robinson Center
- Sam Houston State University The Woodlands Center on the Lone Star College–Montgomery campus in The Woodlands
- Sul Ross State University branch campus locations:
  - Del Rio campus of Southwest Texas Junior College
  - Eagle Pass campus of Southwest Texas Junior College
  - Uvalde campus of Southwest Texas Junior College
- Texas State University Round Rock Campus in Round Rock

Sam Houston State formerly operated the Sam Houston State University Park Campus at Lone Star College-University Park near Tomball.
