= Lamar Institute of Technology =

Public technical school in Beaumont, Texas, U.S.

- Motto: Get a Degree that Works!
- Type: public technical school
- Established: 1995
- President: Sidney E. Valentine
- Faculty: 264 (Fall 2019)
- Students: 8,129 (FY 2019) Credit & Non-Credit
- Location: Beaumont, Texas, U.S. 30°2′53.9″N 94°4′39.2″W
- Colors: Blue and Red
- Website: www.lit.edu

Lamar Institute of Technology is a public technical school in Beaumont, Texas, United States. It was formerly a part of Lamar University, but became a separate institution when the university joined the Texas State University System in 1995.

== History ==
Lamar Institute of Technology was chartered in 1949 when the Lamar College Bill was passed. The bill was sponsored in the Texas Legislature by State Representative Jack Brooks and Senator W.R. Cousins, Jr. of Beaumont. The institute began as the Division of Vocations within Lamar College. The division became the Lamar School of Vocations in 1955. In 1971, the division began awarding associate's degrees.

In 1972 it expanded its offerings and was renamed as the College of Technical Arts within Lamar University, which had achieved full university status.

In 1990, all of Lamar University's two-year programs were combined into the Lamar University Institute of Technology. When Lamar University was absorbed into the Texas State University System in 1995, the Institute of Technology became independent. In 1999, the school was renamed the Lamar Institute of Technology by the Texas Legislature.

== Governance ==
A board of nine regents, appointed by the Governor and confirmed by the State Senate for terms of six years, governs The Texas State University System. The Board of Regents delegates the direction of affairs to the president, campus administrative officers, and faculty.

== Accreditation ==
Lamar Institute of Technology is accredited by the Southern Association of Colleges and Schools, Commission on Colleges to award degrees at the associate level. The Dental Hygiene Program is accredited by the American Dental Association Commission on Dental Accreditation. The Respiratory Therapy Program is accredited by the Commission on Accreditation for Respiratory Care. The Diagnostic Medical Sonography Programs are accredited by the Commission on Accreditation of Allied Health Education Programs. The Medical Radiologic Technology Program is accredited by the Joint Review Committee for Education in Radiologic Technology. The Commission on Accreditation for Health Informatics and Information Management accredits the Health Information Technology Program.

== Academics ==
Lamar Institute of Technology offers more than 50 programs in allied health, business, industry, and public service and safety. Two-year programs provide training prior to entry into a career. Programs are offered on the campus in Beaumont and some classes are offered in other locations throughout the service area.
