= Lamar State College–Port Arthur =

Community college in Port Arthur, Texas, US

Lamar State College Port Arthur
- Former names: Port Arthur Business College, Port Arthur Collegiate Institute, Port Arthur College, Lamar University Center at Port Arthur, Lamar University-Port Arthur
- Type: Public community college
- Established: 1909
- Founder: John W. Gates
- Affiliations: Texas State University System
- Chancellor: Brian McCall
- President: Betty J. Reynard
- Students: 2,740 (Fall 2019)
- Location: 1500 Procter Street, Port Arthur, Texas, 77640, U.S. 29°52′41.8″N 93°55′33.0″W
- Campus: Urban
- Colors: Navy blue and Columbia blue
- Nickname: Seahawks
- Sporting affiliations: NJCAA Div. I
- Mascot: Arthur
- Website: www.lamarpa.edu

Lamar State College Port Arthur is a public community college in Port Arthur, Texas, United States. The college has 2,740 students as of the Fall 2019 semester. It is a member of the Texas State University System.

== History ==
Lamar State College Port Arthur is a two-year institution located in Port Arthur, Texas. The school was founded in 1909 as Port Arthur College by John Warne Gates. Port Arthur College was a city-owned, nonprofit, vocational school specializing in business and electronics education, offering training in stenography, secretarial work, bookkeeping, accounting, and radio.

By 1925 the college owned a 15-acre campus. In 1933, radio station KPAC was established. In 1947 the school had 25 faculty members and an average annual enrollment of 800. A new $800,000 classroom-administration building was occupied in November 1967, and two new buildings were erected to house vocational programs in 1973 and 1974. The 1974-75 regular term enrollment was 409 students.

Port Arthur College joined Lamar University in 1975 and was designated as a component of the Lamar University System in 1983. It received degree-granting status from the Texas legislature in 1991 and was accredited by the Southern Association of Colleges and Schools. In 1995 the school became part of the Texas State University System with the college renamed from Lamar University-Port Arthur to Lamar State College Port Arthur in 1999.

== Academics ==
Lamar State College Port Arthur offers more than 40 degrees and certificates in technical and academic disciplines.

== Campus ==
Lamar State College Port Arthur's campus is located near downtown Port Arthur on 40-plus acres. It features the Sheila McCarthy Umphrey Industrial Technology Center, the Carl Parker Multipurpose Center, and the Gates Memorial Library. The $5.9 million Performing Arts Center was completed in 2004 and the $2.1 million Student Success Center was completed in late 2011. The Umphrey Industrial Technology Center is the newest addition to the campus, built in 2017, provides a first-class learning space for the Process Technology, Instrumentation Technology, Drafting, and Heating, Ventilation and Air Conditioning programs.

Several historic buildings are located on the campus, including the Gates Memorial Library, named for the college's founder, John W. Gates. The two-story Classical Revival building was entered into the National Register of Historic Places in 1981. A major $2.1 million addition and renovation of the library was completed in 2004. The A.J.M. Vuylsteke home, the former residence of the Consul of the Netherlands, bears a Texas state historical marker, as does the Ruby Ruth Fuller Building, originally the city's First United Methodist Church.

== Athletics ==
LSCPA sports teams are known as the Seahawks and their colors are Navy Blue and Columbia Blue. Sports teams include Men's Basketball and Women's Softball. The college added athletics in 2004, playing as an independent two seasons before joining the Metro Athletic Conference as a Division II team for two seasons. Became a Division I member of the National Junior College Athletic Association in 2006. The men's basketball team advanced to the NJCAA National Championship Tournament under head coach Matt Cross during the 2010–2011 season.
