= Lamar State College–Orange =

Public community college in Orange, Texas, U.S.

Lamar State College Orange
- Former names: Lamar University Center at Orange, Lamar University-Orange
- Type: Public community college
- Established: 1969
- Parent institution: Texas State University System
- Chancellor: Brian McCall
- President: Wendy Elmore
- Students: 3,613
- Location: Orange, Texas, 77630, U.S. 30°5′28.7″N 93°43′56.9″W
- Campus: Urban
- Colors: Green and Orange
- Website: www.lsco.edu

Lamar State College–Orange is a public community college in Orange, Texas, United States. It serves approximately 3,600 students and is a member of the Texas State University System.

== History ==
Opened in the fall of 1969 as an extension center of Lamar University, LSC-O first held classes in a vacant elementary school (Tilley Elementary) located on the site of the former naval base in Orange. That structure burned in 1971, prompting community leaders to raise funds for the purchase of a new facility that could accommodate students. The fund-raising campaign produced $250,000 that allowed for the purchase of a building located on Front Street in downtown Orange. That same year the Texas legislature approved the operation of a two-year educational center in Orange and appropriated $125,000 to support the operation of the center (known as Lamar University at Orange).

Joe Ben Welch played a key role in the early growth and development of the college. He served as director, dean, provost, and president during his nineteen-year tenure at the institution. The initial class offerings focused on academic courses that would transfer and count toward a baccalaureate degree. Welch, however, saw the need to offer career-oriented programs that would prepare students for immediate entry into the workforce and began to add programs such as vocational nursing and welding. The campus attracted more students and enrollment grew to over 800 students by 1979.

During the 1980s, the college gained its own identity and became independent from Lamar University. The Texas legislature created the Lamar University System in 1983 and named Lamar University at Orange as a component of that system. In 1985, Texas voters approved a constitutional amendment establishing a dedicated fund for capital expenditures. Lamar—Orange was included among the institutions eligible to draw upon this fund. The campus applied to the Southern Association of Colleges and Schools for independent accreditation in 1987 and received that accreditation in 1989. The Texas legislature affirmed the college's degree granting authority in 1991.

Following Welch's departure, the Lamar University System Board of Regents named Steve Maradian as president. He served until 1994 and was successful in bringing external grant funding to the campus. In 1994, the board selected J. Michael Shahan to succeed Maradian.

During Shahan's time as president, the campus grew to over 2,000 students. The Ron E. Lewis Library was completed in 2001, the first new construction in the college's history. A new nursing and classroom building was added in 2013. Major improvements were made in parking and landscaping. The campus suffered $10 million in damages due to Hurricane Ike in 2008 but was able to resume classes in three weeks. The Texas legislature abolished the Lamar University System in 1995 and moved Lamar—Orange into the Texas State University System. In 1999, the legislature renamed the institution Lamar State College—Orange. The campus grew to 12 buildings across three city blocks and added a Maritime program that is certified through the U.S. Coast Guard and a Fishing Club.

In 2018, Thomas A. Johnson was selected to replace Shahan, who retired after 24 years as president. President Johnson introduced Tilley the Gator as the school mascot in 2019. During the COVID-19 pandemic the college offered free summer courses, flexible learning options, and a virtual commencement. The college was also impacted by hurricanes Laura and Delta in 2020. A college masterplan was launched in late 2020, including plans for new buildings.

The college grew its numbers substantially in this period, reaching 3,400 students in fall 2024 having been less than 2,400 in fall 2022. The college opened its first satellite campus in Lumberton in 2023 and cooperated with Lamar State College Port Arthur and Lamar Institute of Technology in opening a university center in Livingston. A new academic building opened in fall 2024 and the Student Success Center, housed in the historic First Baptist Church of Orange, in spring 2025.

Johnson retired at the end of 2024 and was replaced as president by Wendy Elmore, previously the college's vice president and provost.
