= List of Fordham University alumni =

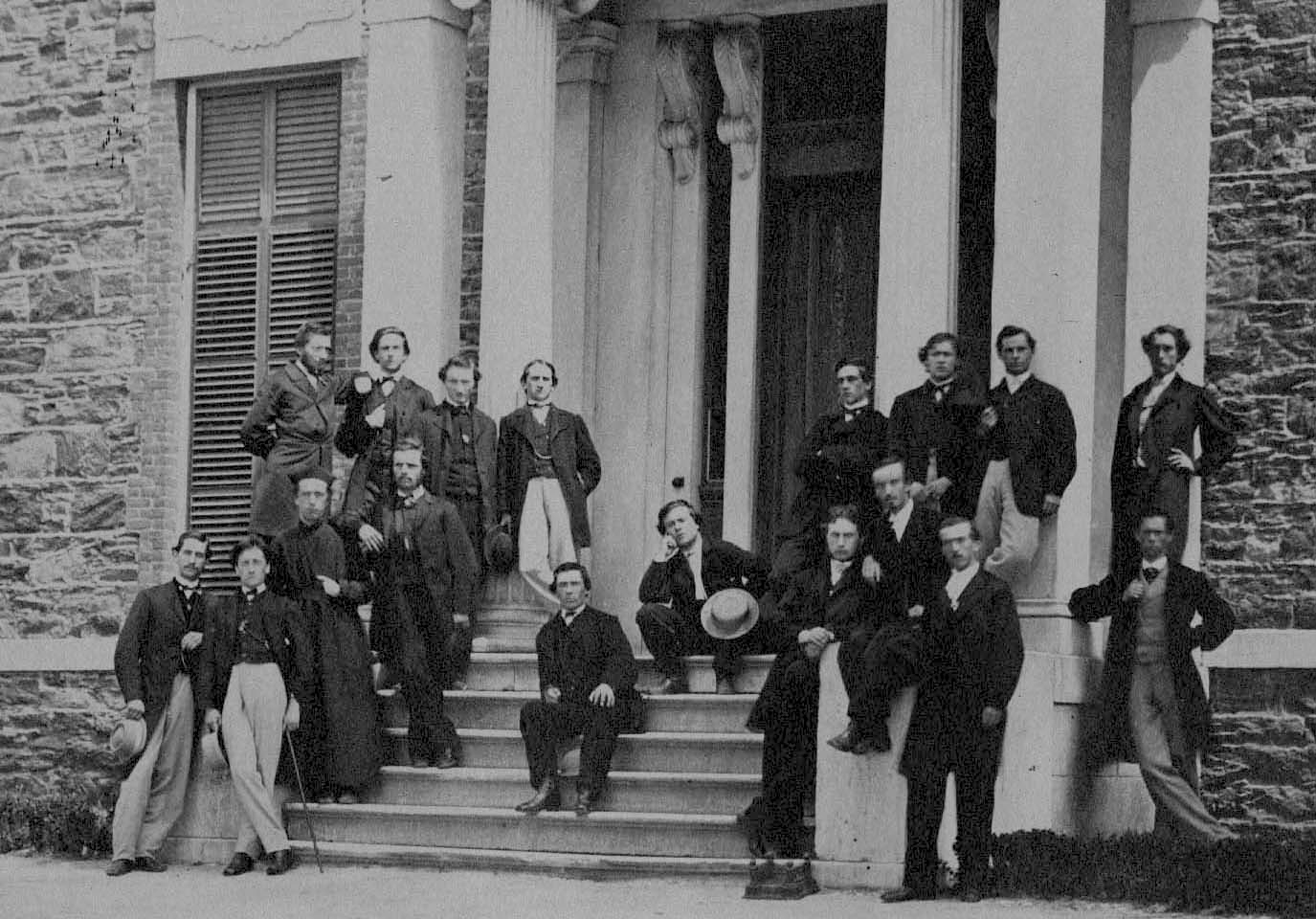
Fordham College (then St. John's College) class of 1865 assembled on the steps of the Cunniffe House

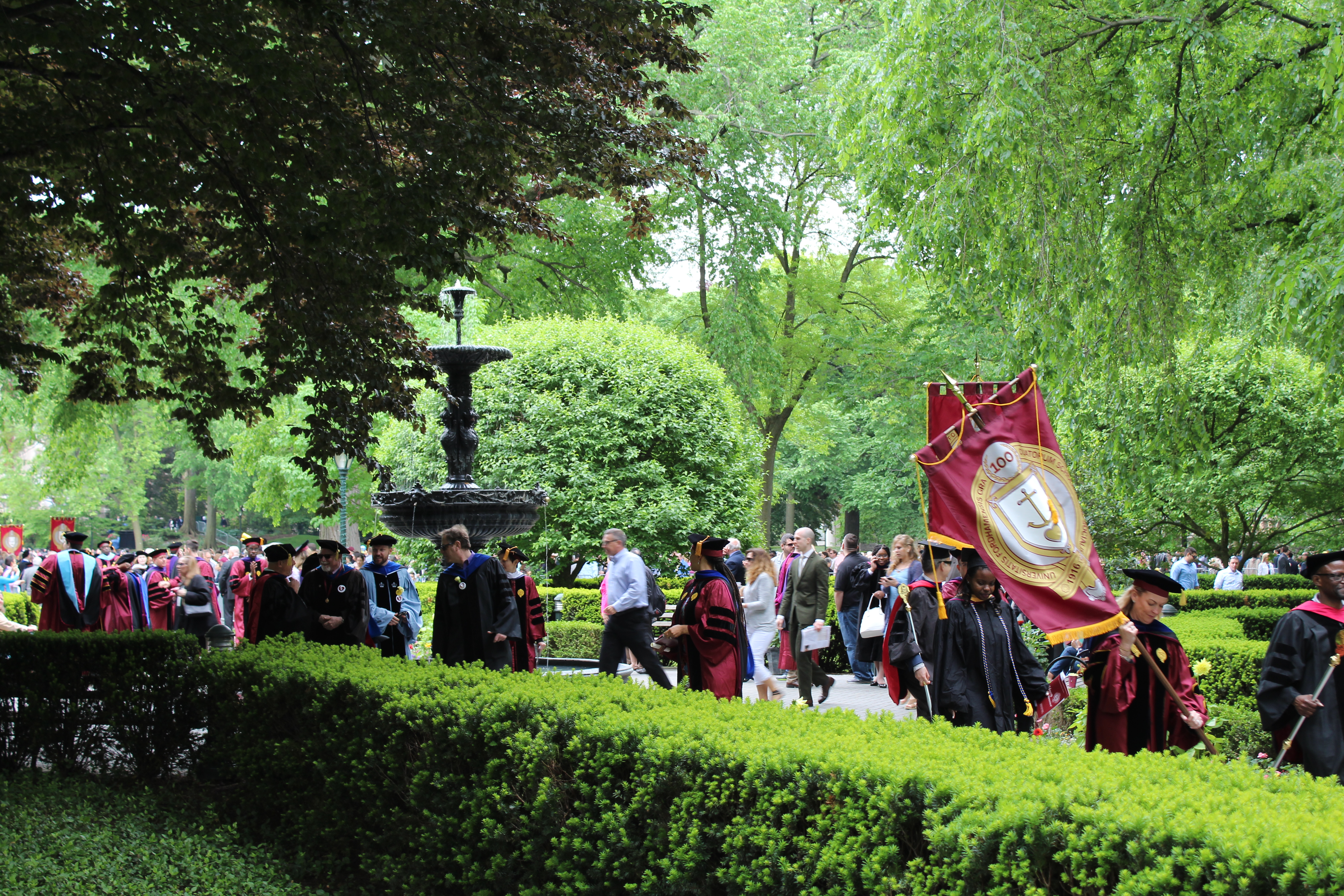
Students and faculty during Fordham University's 2017 commencement ceremony

Fordham University is a private, Roman Catholic research university located in New York City, New York, United States. Founded in 1841, it is the oldest Catholic institution of higher education in the northeastern United States, the third-oldest university in the state of New York, and the only Jesuit university in New York City. Since its establishment 185 years ago as St. John's College, the university has been home to multiple colleges and schools, some of which are defunct or have gone through changes in name. As of 2017, Fordham is composed of a total of four undergraduate and six constitutive graduate schools, situated across three campuses in southern New York State, with its two main campuses in New York City: Rose Hill in The Bronx, and Lincoln Center in Manhattan.

As of 2017, Fordham claims over 183,500 alumni throughout the world. Numerous U.S. and international politicians are counted among Fordham's alumni body, including Central Intelligence Directors William J. Casey and John O. Brennan, U.S. Attorney General John N. Mitchell, various governors, and a head of state: Hage Geingob, President of Namibia Anne M. Mulcahy, chairperson and CEO of Xerox, Wellington Mara (owner of the New York Giants), and billionaire entrepreneurs Eugene Shvidler and Lorenzo Mendoza are alumni. As a Jesuit institution, the university claims numerous Roman Catholic clergy, including Álvaro Corrada del Río, bishop of Mayagüez; Cardinal Francis Spellman, archbishop of New York; and Eugene Marino, archbishop of Atlanta.

Fordham has numerous alumni in the entertainment industry. Emmy Award-winning actor Alan Alda; in film, Academy Award-winner Denzel Washington and nominee Patricia Clarkson; and in theater, Tony winners John Benjamin Hickey, Robert Sean Leonard, and Julie White are alumni. Voice actor and comedian Bill Lobley graduated from Fordham as well. Brit Award-winning singer-songwriter Lana Del Rey is an alumna, as are writers Mary Higgins Clark and Don DeLillo. Football players and coaches Vince Lombardi and Peter Carlesimo are alumni, as well as two-time Olympic gold medal-winning track runner Tom Courtney. Stage, film, and television actor Dylan McDermott graduated from Fordham College at Lincoln Center in 1983.

== Legend ==
Notes and abbreviations used

- Individuals who may belong in multiple sections appear only in one.
- An empty class year or school/degree box indicates that the information is unknown.
- "DNG" indicates the alumnus or alumna attended but did not graduate; year(s) of attendance are included if available.

Colleges and schools

- FC – Fordham College

- SJC – St. John's College (1841–1907)

- GSAS – Graduate School of Arts and Sciences
- GE – Graduate School of Education
- UGE – Undergraduate School of Education (1916–1967)
- GRE – Graduate School of Religion and Religious Education
- Law – School of Law
- GSB – Gabelli School of Business

- CBA – formerly College of Business Administration (1920–2005)

- GSSS – Graduate School of Social Service
- SCPS – School of Professional and Continuing Studies
- MS – School of Medicine (1905–1919)
- PHC – School of Pharmacy (1905–1966)
- TMC – Thomas More College (women's college, 1964–1972)
- MC – Marymount College (consolidated 2002; closed 2005)

Degrees and certificates
B.A. – Bachelor of Arts
B.F.A. – Bachelor of Fine Arts
B.S. – Bachelor of Science
M.A. – Master of Arts
M.F.A. – Master of Fine Arts
M.S. – Master of Science
MBA – Master of Business Administration
MPharm – Master of Pharmacy
PhD – Doctorate
Ed.D. – Doctor of Education
CBA – Certificate of Business Administration
P.D. – Professional Diploma in Administration and Supervision
LL.B. – Bachelor of Law
M.L. – Master of Law
LL.D. – Legum Doctor
J.D. – Juris Doctor

== Academia ==
=== College and university presidents ===
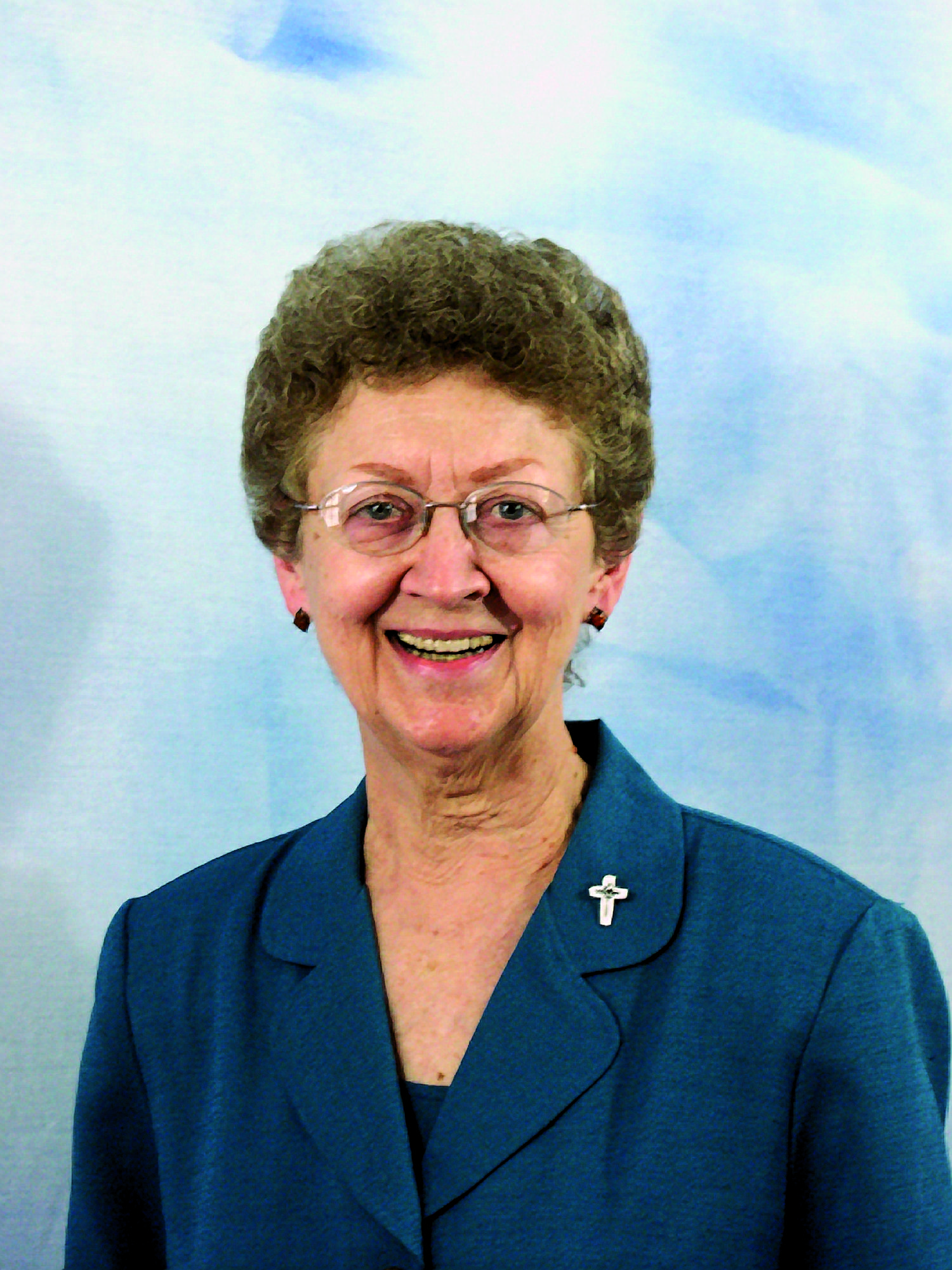
Sister Barbara Doherty, S.P.

Name	Class year	School(s)	Degree(s)	Notability	Ref.
William Boylan			Doctor of Philosophy	First president of Brooklyn College	
Seamus Carey	1993, 1996	GSAS	M.A., PhD	President of Transylvania University	
Francesco Cesareo		GSAS	M.A., PhD	President of Assumption College, historian	
Vincent Cooke, S.J.	1960, 1962, 1965	FCRH, GRE, GSAS	B.A., M.A.	President of Canisius College (1993–2010), acting president of John Carroll University (1992)	
Steven DiSalvo	1984, 1990, 2002	FC, GE	B.S., MBA, PhD	President of Endicott College	
Barbara Doherty, S.P.		GRE	PhD	Former president of Saint Mary-of-the-Woods College	
John B. Duff		FC	B.S.	8th president of Columbia College Chicago	
Timothy S. Healy	1953	GSAS	M.A.	Former president of Georgetown University	
Michael Holman, S.J.	DNG	GE		Principal of Heythrop College, University of London	
Candace Introcaso, CDP	1986	GSAS	PhD	President of La Roche College; former vice-president of Heritage University	
Rosemary Jeffries, R.S.M.		GSAS	M.A., PhD	Former president of Georgian Court University	
Eamon Kelly	1958	FC	B.S.	President emeritus of Tulane University	
Robert B. Lawton	1970	FC	B.S.	President of Loyola Marymount University	
Gerald W. Lynch	1958	FC	B.S.	President of John Jay College of Criminal Justice	
William J. McGill	1943, 1947	FC, GSAS	B.S., M.S.	President of Columbia University	
Robert J. Morris		Law		President of University of Dallas	
Edward J. Mortola	1938, 1941, 1946	FC, GSAS	B.A., M.A., PhD	President of Pace University	
Mary Eileen O'Brien	2012	GRE	PhD	President of Dominican University New York	
Leo J. O'Donovan	1961	GSAS	PhD	President emeritus of Georgetown University	
Scott Pilarz, S.J.		GSAS	M.A.	President of the University of Scranton (2003–13)	
Kevin Quinn, S.J.	1979	FC	B.S.	President of the University of Scranton (2013–2017)	
Gerard Reedy, S.J.	1965	GSAS		President of College of the Holy Cross	
Paul Reiss	1954	GSAS	M.A.	President of College of the Holy Cross, and former dean of Marymount College	
Harold Ridley, S.J.	1969	FC	B.A.	23rd president of Loyola College, Maryland	
John Sexton	1963, 1978	FC, GSAS	B.A., M.A., PhD	President, New York University	
Lawrence G. Smith	1971	FC	B.S.	Founding dean of Hofstra Northwell School of Medicine	

- Richard Guarasci, longest-serving president of Wagner College
- Robert Kibbee (died 1982), chancellor of the City University of New York
- Joseph G. Marina, Catholic priest and Jesuit; president of the University of Scranton
- Mary Eileen O'Brien, president of the Dominican University New York
- Jay Sexter, former president of Mercy University

=== Scholars and professors ===
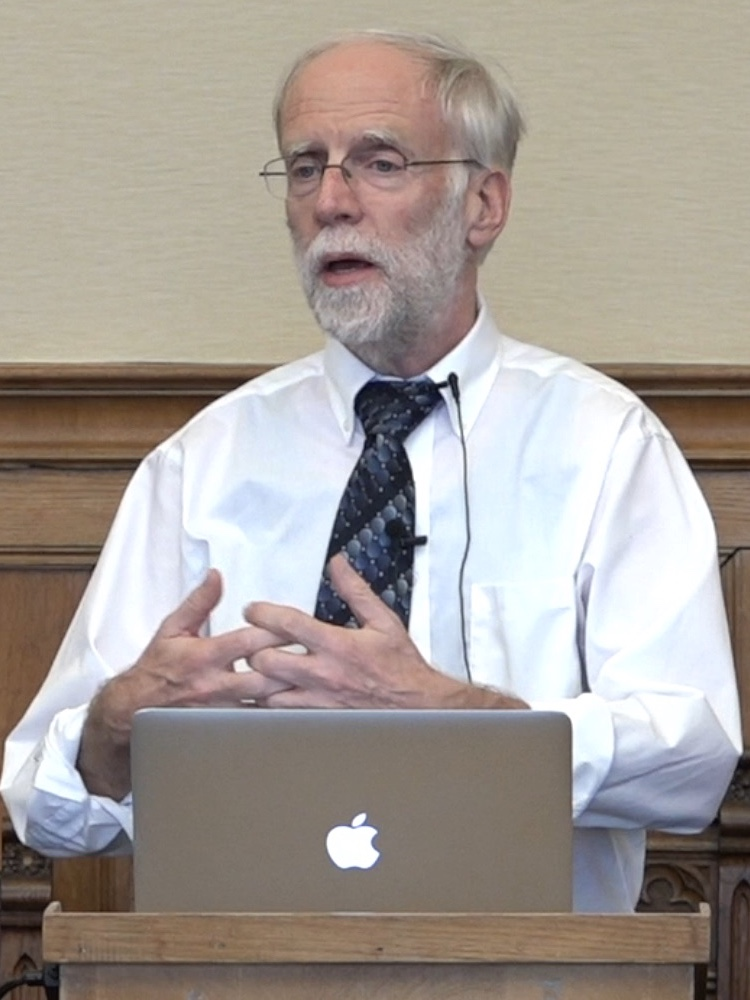
Francis Xavier Clooney, S.J.

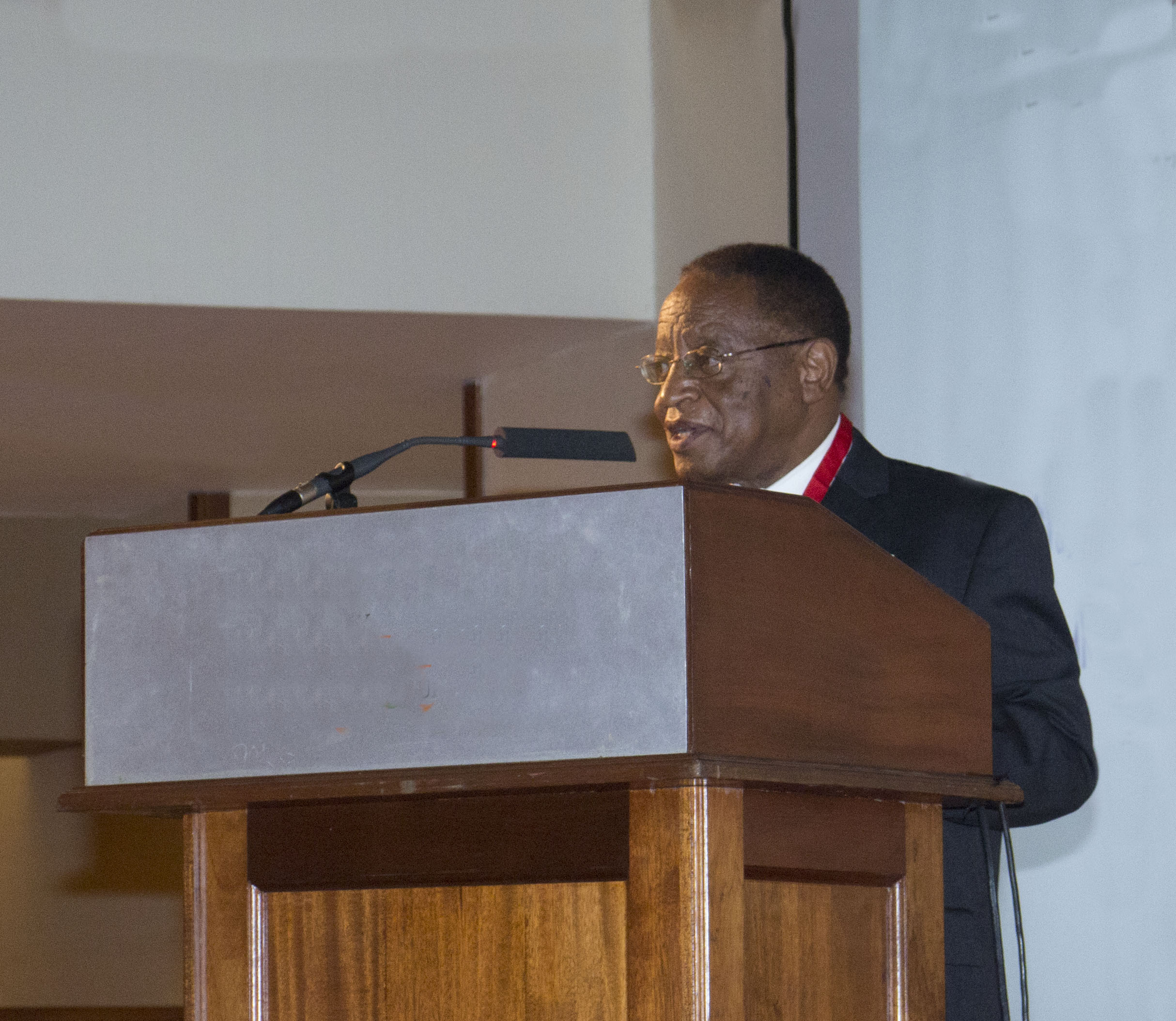
Ezra Suruma

Name	Class year	School(s)	Degree(s)	Notability	Ref.
Regis J. Armstrong, O.F.M.		GRE	PhD	Professor of theology at the Catholic University of America, Capuchin friar	
Ivo Banac	1969	FC	B.A.	Professor of history at Yale University	
Francis J. Beckwith	1989	GSAS	M.A., PhD	Professor of philosophy at Baylor University	
Peter Boghossian	1992	GSAS	M.A.	Professor of philosophy at Portland State University	
James A. Brundage	1955	GSAS	PhD	Professor emeritus of history at the University of Kansas	
Danielle Citron	1994	Law	J.D.	Professor of law at University of Maryland	
Francis Xavier Clooney, S.J.	1973	FC	B.A.	Professor of theology at Harvard University	
Selwyn Cudjoe	1969	FC	B.A.	Professor and scholar of Caribbean literature	
Kenneth C. Davis				Historian	
Kathleen Deignan	1980, 1986	GRE	M.A., PhD	Professor of theology at Iona College	
Nancy Denton	1973	GSAS	M.A.	Professor of sociology at University at Albany, SUNY	
Owen Flanagan	1970	FC	B.A.	James B. Duke Professor of philosophy at Duke University	
Mary Cleophas Garvin	1927	FC	B.S.	Mathematician	
John Allan Grim	1968, 1975	FC, GSAS	B.A., M.A.	Professor at Yale School of Forestry and Environmental Studies	
Beverly Hall	1990	GSAS	Ed.D.	Education administrator	
David Hartman		GSAS	M.A.	Jewish scholar, founder of Shalom Hartman Institute	
Fr. Thomas Hopko	1982	GSAS	PhD	Orthodox Christian theologian	
William Irwin	1992	FC	B.A.	Professor of philosophy at King's College	
Stanley Jaki, OSB	1958	GSAS	PhD	Physicist and theologian, Distinguished Professor at Seton Hall University	
David Kolb	1963	FC, GSAS	B.A., M.A.	Professor of philosophy at Bates College	
Catherine LaCugna	1974, 1979	GRE	M.A., PhD	Professor of theology at University of Notre Dame	
Brian P. Levack	1965	FC	B.A.	Professor of history at University of Texas at Austin	
John J. McDermott	1959	GSAS	PhD	Professor of philosophy at Texas A&M University	
Guillermo Owen	1958	FC	B.S.	Mathematician	
Fernando Picó, S.J.	1966		M.A.	Historian and Jesuit, expert on the history of Puerto Rico, professor of history at the University of Puerto Rico, Río Piedras Campus 1972–2017	
Anthony Picciano	1986	GSAS	PhD	Professor of education at City University of New York	
Robert V. Remini	1943	FCRH	B.S.	Professor emeritus of history at the University of Illinois at Chicago; official historian of the U.S. House of Representatives (2005–2010)	
Claude Schwob	1931		PhD	Researcher on the Manhattan Project	
Donald Spoto	1966, 1970	GSAS	M.A., PhD	Biographer and celebrity historian	
Ezra Suruma	1969	FC, GSAS	B.S., M.S.	Economist	
Vince Tinto	1963	FC	B.S.	Theorist in the field of higher education, particularly concerning university student retention	
Mary Evelyn Tucker	1977	GSAS	M.A.	Co-founder and co-director of the Yale Forum on Religion and Ecology	
Susana Urbina	1972	GSAS	PhD	Psychologist, scholar	
Alice von Hildebrand				Catholic theologian	
Lee Ward		GSAS	PhD	Canadian political scientist and historian	
Phyllis Zagano	1969	MC	B.A.	Professor of theology at Hofstra University	

== Art and literature ==
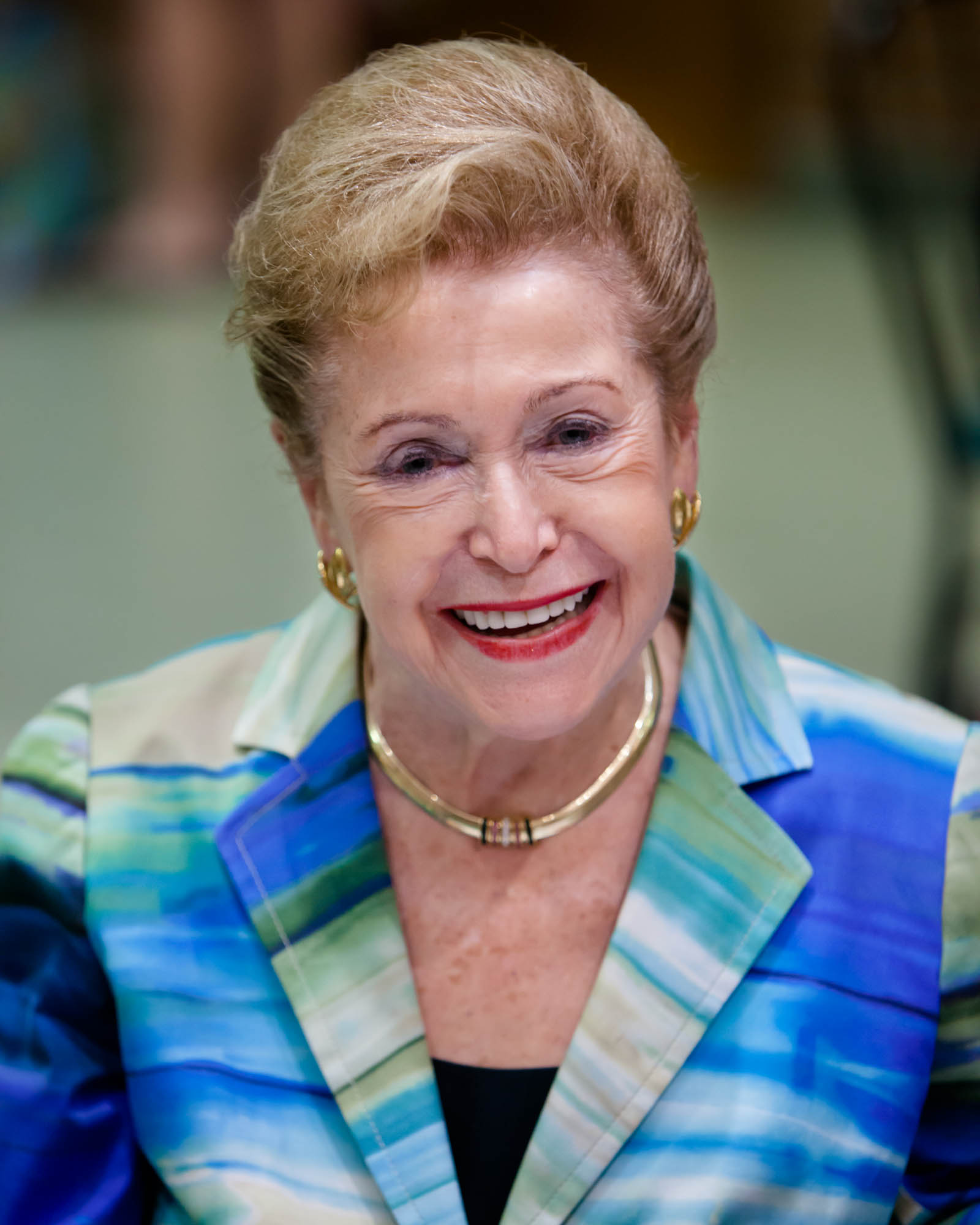
Mary Higgins Clark

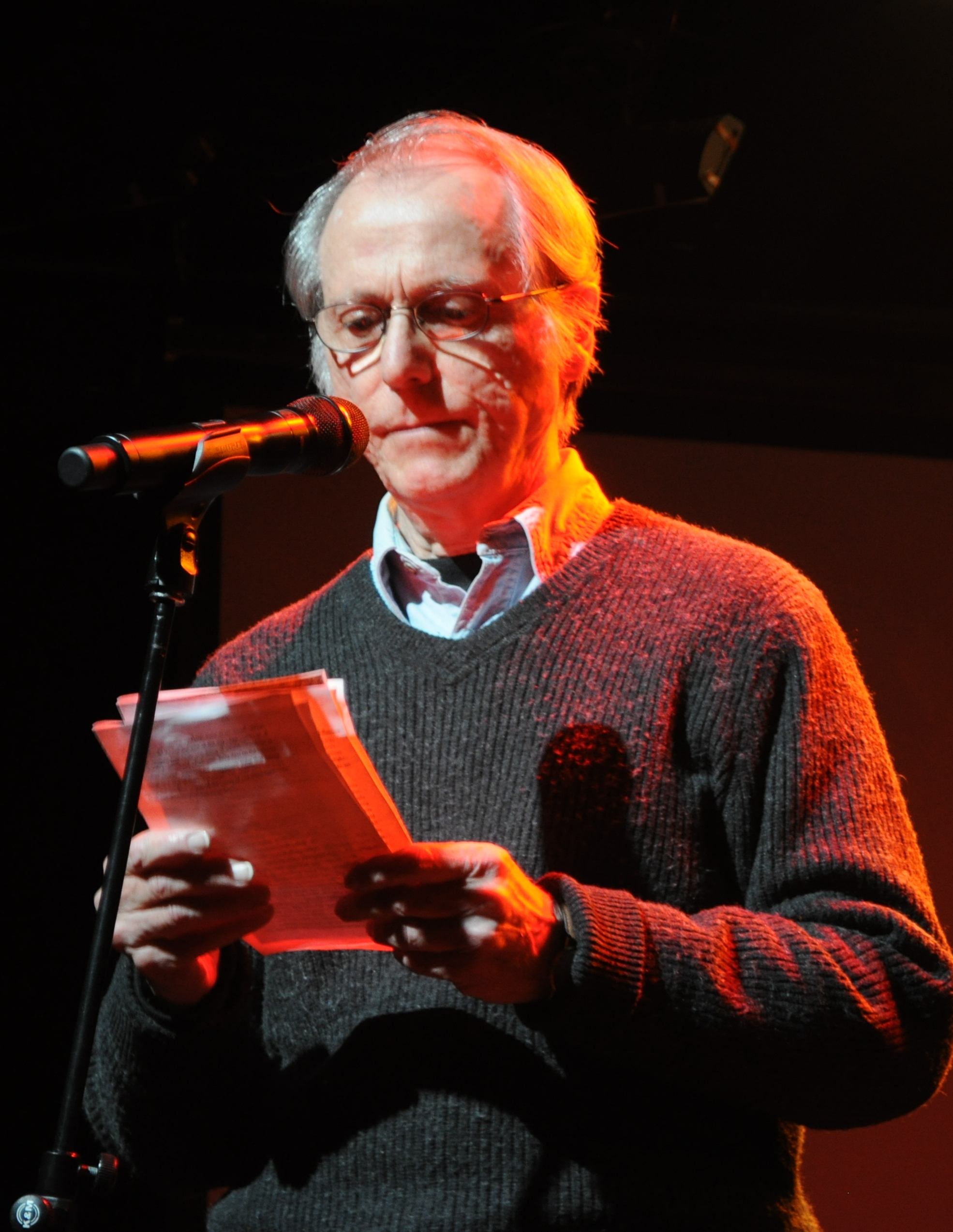
Don DeLillo

Name	Class year	School(s)	Degree(s)	Notability	Ref.
Michael Alig	1984–85; DNG	FC	—N/a	Writer, club promoter	
Candida Alvarez	1977	FC	B.F.A.	Painter	
Lester Atwell				Author	
Lorraine Avila			B.A.	Writer	
Edward Bloor	1973	FC	B.A.	Author	
Thomas Cahill	1964	FC	B.A.	Author	
Paddy Chayefsky	1943 (DNG)		—N/a	Playwright	
Kevin Clancy	2007	GSB	MBA	Blogger	
Mary Higgins Clark	1979	FC	B.A.	Novelist	
Maureen Corrigan		FC	B.A.	Writer, critic	
Michael Craig-Martin	1959–61 (DNG)	FC	—N/a	Irish-British conceptual artist	
Don DeLillo	1958	FC	B.S.	National Book Award and PEN/Faulkner Award-winning author	
Michael Donaghy	1976	FC	B.A.	Poet	
Thomas Fleming	1950	FC	B.A.	History author	
Richard Foerster	1971	FC	B.A.	Poet	
Warren King	1938	FC	B.S.	Cartoonist	
John LaFarge	1852	SJC	B.A.	Visual artist, stained glass window-maker	
Thomas Maier	FC	1978		Author	
Robert Marasco	1958	FC	B.A.	Horror novelist and playwright	
Charles Martin		FC	B.A.	Poet	
Harry Mattison	1974	FC	B.A.	Photographer	
Bernice McFadden	1983	FC	B.A.	Novelist	
Robert Munsch	1969	FC	B.A.	Children's author	
Virginia O'Hanlon	1930	GSAS	PhD	As a child, wrote a letter to the New York Sun asking about Santa Claus which prompted the famous response "Yes, Virginia, there is a Santa Claus"	
Isaac Oliver		FC	B.A.	Playwright, author, comic	
Lev Raphael	1975	FC	B.A.	Author	
John Sanford	1927	Law	J.D.	Author	
Valerie Sayers		FC		Author	
John Dawson Gilmary Shea	1854	SJC	LL.D.	Author and historian	
Courtney Sheinmel		Law	J.D.	Children's literature author	
Jeanette Pasin Sloan	1967	MC	B.F.A.	Visual artist	
Antony Theodore	1980	GSAS	PhD	Poet	
B.A. Van Sise		Visual Arts	B.A.	Photographer	

== Business ==
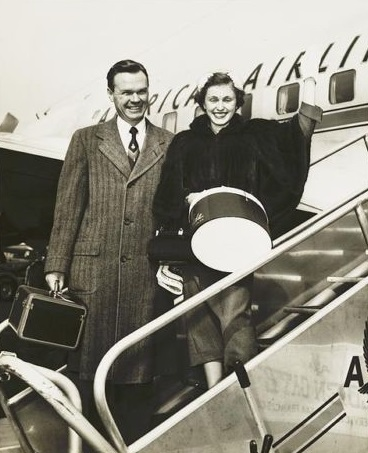
Wellington Mara (left)

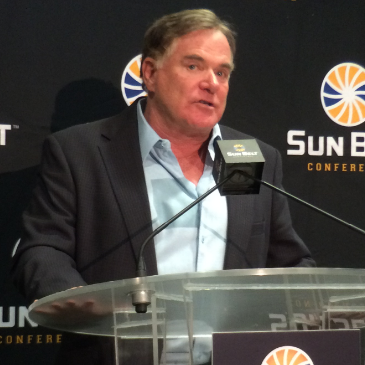
Joe Moglia

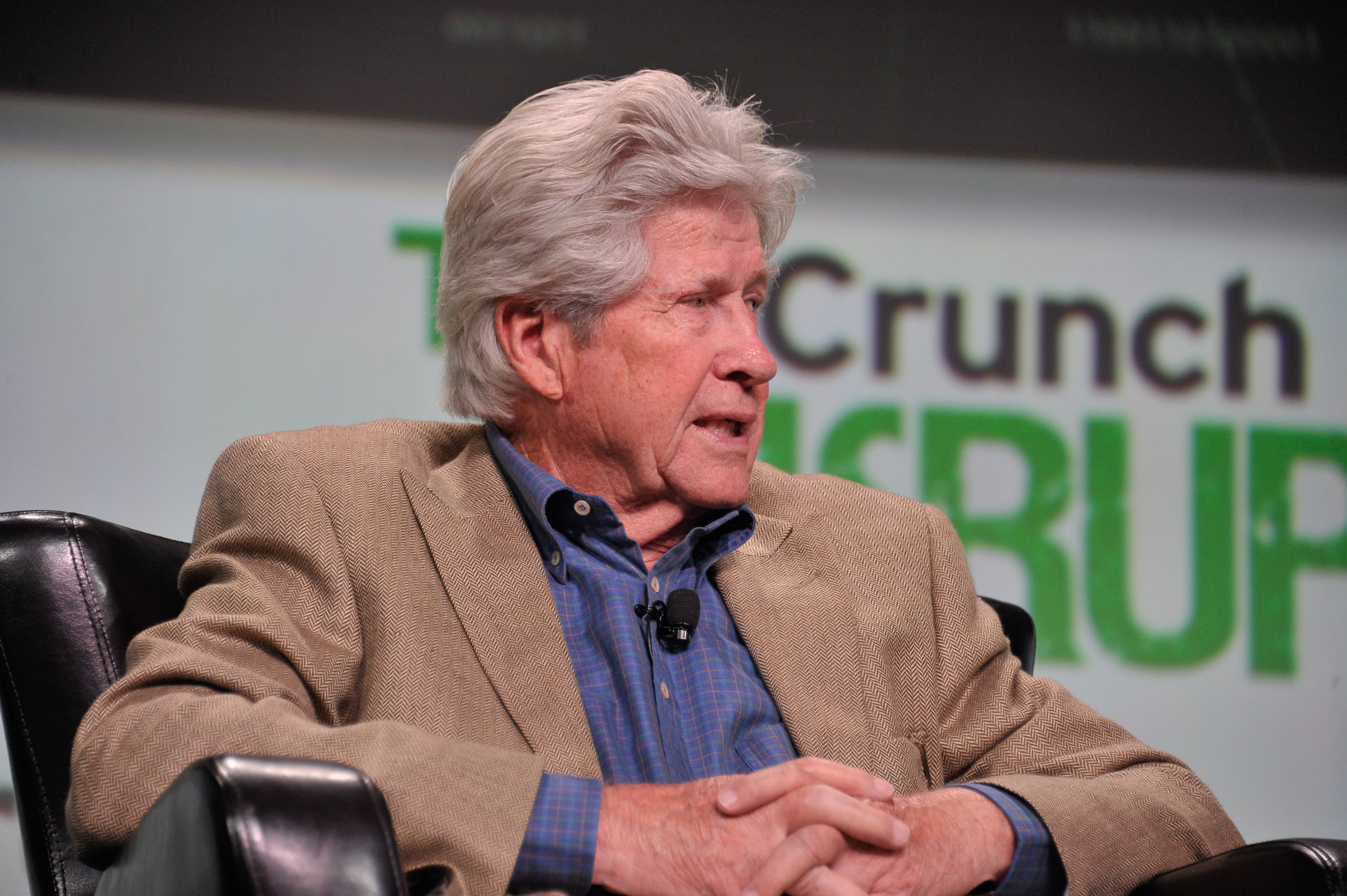
Don Valentine

Name	Class year	School(s)	Degree(s)	Notability	Ref.
Robert A. Agresta	2005	FC	B.S.	Investor, politician	
Raul Alarcon	1978	FC	B.S.	CEO of Spanish Broadcasting System	
Ellen Alemany	1980	GSB	MBA	Former chairman and CEO of RBS Citizens Financial Group and RBS Americas	
Darcy Antonellis		GSB	MBA	CEO of Vubiquity	
Louis Boccardi	1958	FC	B.S.	CEO (1985–2003) of Associated Press; member of the Pulitzer Prize Board 1994–2003	
Rose Marie Bravo	1971	FC	B.S.	Vice executive and former CEO of Burberry	
Kathleen Brown	1985	Law		Senior advisor, head of Public Finance (Western Region) of Goldman Sachs	
Kevin Burke	1977	Law	J.D.	Chairman, president, and CEO of Con Edison	
Wendy Craigg				Former governor of the Central Bank of the Bahamas	
Harry Crosby		GSB	MBA	Investment banker, former actor; son of Bing Crosby	
Andrew Dana	2012	GSB	MBA	Restaurateur	
Katherine DePaul		FC	B.A.	Record executive	
Mario Gabelli	1965	GSB	CBA	Billionaire founder, chairman, CEO, and chief investment officer of GAMCO Investors; donated $25 million to Fordham University in September 2010 for the undergraduate business school, renamed the Gabelli School of Business	
Stephen J. Hemsley	1974	GSB	CBA	CEO of UnitedHealth Group	
Matt Higgins	2002	Law	J.D.	Executive of Miami Dolphins and New York Jets; co-founder of RSE Ventures	
Maria Elena Lagomasino	1977	GSB	MBA	CEO (2001–2005) of JP Morgan Private Bank; board of directors, Coca-Cola	
John Leahy	1972	FC	B.A.	COO of Customers, Airbus	
John Mara	1979	Law	M.L.	President, COO, and co-owner of the New York Giants	
Wellington Mara	1937	FC		Former owner of the NFL's New York Giants from 1959 until his death	
Robert B. McKeon		FC	B.S.	Chairman of Veritas Capital	
Lorenzo Mendoza	1991	FC		Venezuelan billionaire, CEO of Empresas Polar	
Joe Moglia	1971	FC		Former chairman and CEO of TD Ameritrade	
Angelo Mozilo	1960	CBA		Co-founder, chairman, and CEO of Countrywide Financial Corporation	
Anne M. Mulcahy	1974	MC		Chairman and CEO of Xerox	
Donna Redel	1995	Law	J.D.	Businesswoman and philanthropist	
Eugene Shvidler	1992	GSB	MBA	Russian-American billionaire, international oil tycoon	
Don Valentine	1954	FC	B.A.	Venture capitalist at Sequoia Capital; an original investor of Apple Computer, Atari, LSI Logic, Oracle Corporation, Cisco, Electronic Arts, Google, and YouTube	
Rosemary Vrablic		FC		Managing director and senior private banker of Deutsche Bank's US private wealth management business, with clients like Donald Trump	

- Michael J. Dowling, president and chief executive officer of Northwell Health
- Thomas F. Woodlock, editor of the Wall Street Journal and US Interstate Commerce Commission commissioner

== Civil society ==
=== Clergy ===
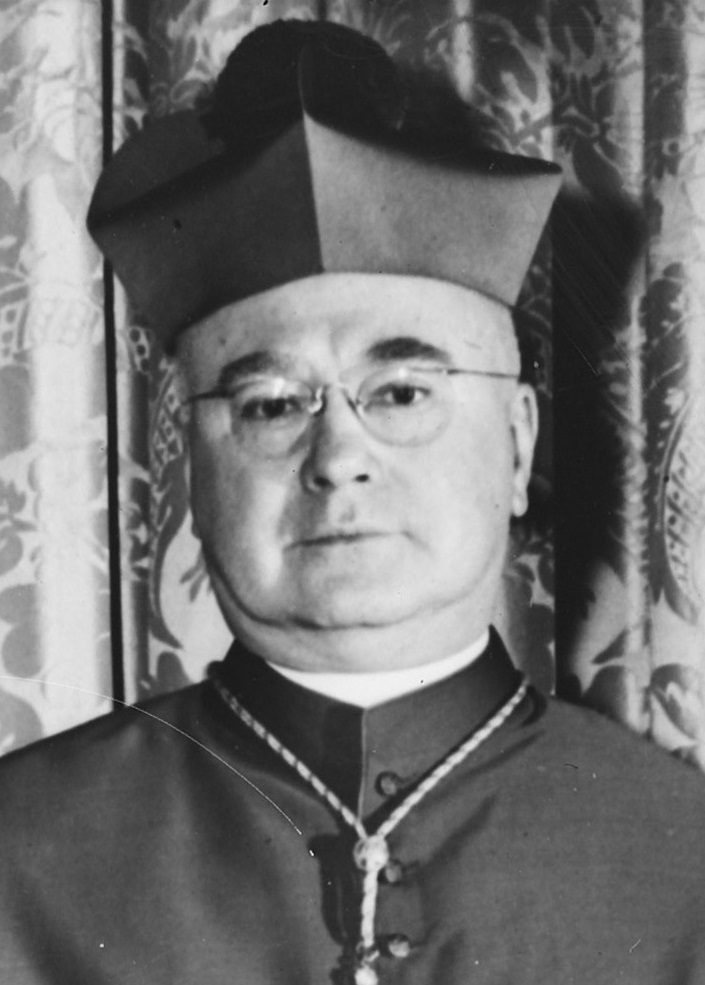
Francis Spellman

Name	Class year	School(s)	Degree(s)	Notability	Ref.
Emilio S. Allué	1981	GSAS	PhD	Auxiliary bishop, Roman Catholic Archdiocese of Boston	
Gordon Bennett, S.J.	1980	SCPS	P.D.	Bishop emeritus, Diocese of Mandeville	
Edwin Broderick	1945	GSAS	PhD	Roman Catholic prelate, bishop of Albany	
Elden Francis Curtiss		GRE		Roman Catholic prelate, former bishop of Helena, Montana	
Edward Vincent Dargin	1919	FC	B.A.	Roman Catholic prelate, auxiliary bishop of Archdiocese of New York	
Álvaro Corrada del Río, S.J.	1974	FC	B.A.	Roman Catholic prelate, bishop of Mayagüez	
Joan Frances Gormley		GRE	PhD	Consecrated virgin and Roman Catholic nun, Biblical scholar	
George Henry Guilfoyle	1968	Law	J.D.	Roman Catholic prelate, bishop of Camden	
Michael John Hoban	1873 (DNG)	SJC	—N/a	Roman Catholic prelate, bishop of Scranton	
Lubomyr Husar, M.S.U.	1966	GSAS		Major archbishop, Ukrainian Catholic Church	
John Joseph Jenik				Auxiliary bishop of the Roman Catholic Archdiocese of New York	
Joseph Kopacz		GSAS	M.A.	Bishop, Roman Catholic Diocese of Jackson	
Eugene Antonio Marino		GRE	M.A.	First African-American archbishop in North America	
James Massa	1997	GSAS	PhD	Bishop, Roman Catholic Diocese of Brooklyn	
Theodore Edgar McCarrick		FC		Cardinal and archbishop of Washington	
Thomas John McDonnell			M.A.	Auxiliary bishop of New York, coadjutor bishop of Wheeling	
Nicolas M. Mondejar	1959	GSSS	M.S.	Bishop emeritus, Diocese of Romblon, Philippines	
Robert C. Morlino		FC	B.A.	Bishop of Madison; former bishop of Helena, Montana	
Patrick O'Boyle				First resident archbishop of Washington	
Terrence Prendergast, S.J.		FC	B.A.	Archbishop, Roman Catholic Archdiocese of Ottawa	
Sylvester Horton Rosecrans	1846	SJC		Bishop, Roman Catholic Diocese of Columbus	
Francis Spellman	1911	FC	B.A.	Cardinal and archbishop of New York	
Anthony Taylor	1989	GSAS	PhD	Bishop, Diocese of Little Rock, Arkansas	
Gerald Thomas Walsh	1983	M.S.	GSS	Vicar general, Roman Catholic Archdiocese of New York	

=== Activism ===
Name	Class year	School(s)	Degree(s)	Notability	Ref.
Virginia Apuzzo	1973	GE	M.S.	Gay rights activist	
Emma L. Bowen				Health care and media activist	
Mirtha Colón		GSSS	M.S.	Garifuna and HIV/AIDS activist	
Elizabeth McAlister	1961	MC	B.A.	Peace activist, former Roman Catholic nun	
Peter Hildebrand Meienberg	1959	GSAS	M.A.	Missionary and prison reform activist in East Africa	
Encarnación Padilla de Armas			B.A., doctorate (Hon. Causa)	Community leader, organizer, and advocate	
Ilyasah Shabazz		GSAS	M.S.	Social activist, writer, daughter of Malcolm X	
Elizabeth Yeampierre	1980		B.A.	Attorney and environmental activist	

== Entertainment ==
=== Film, television, dance, and theater ===
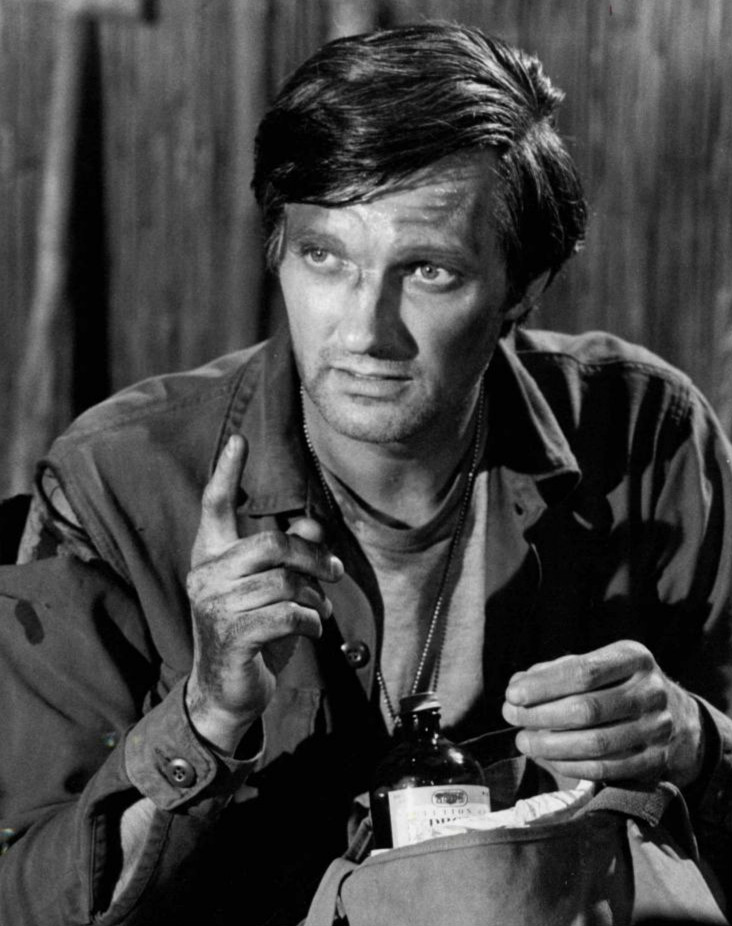
Alan Alda

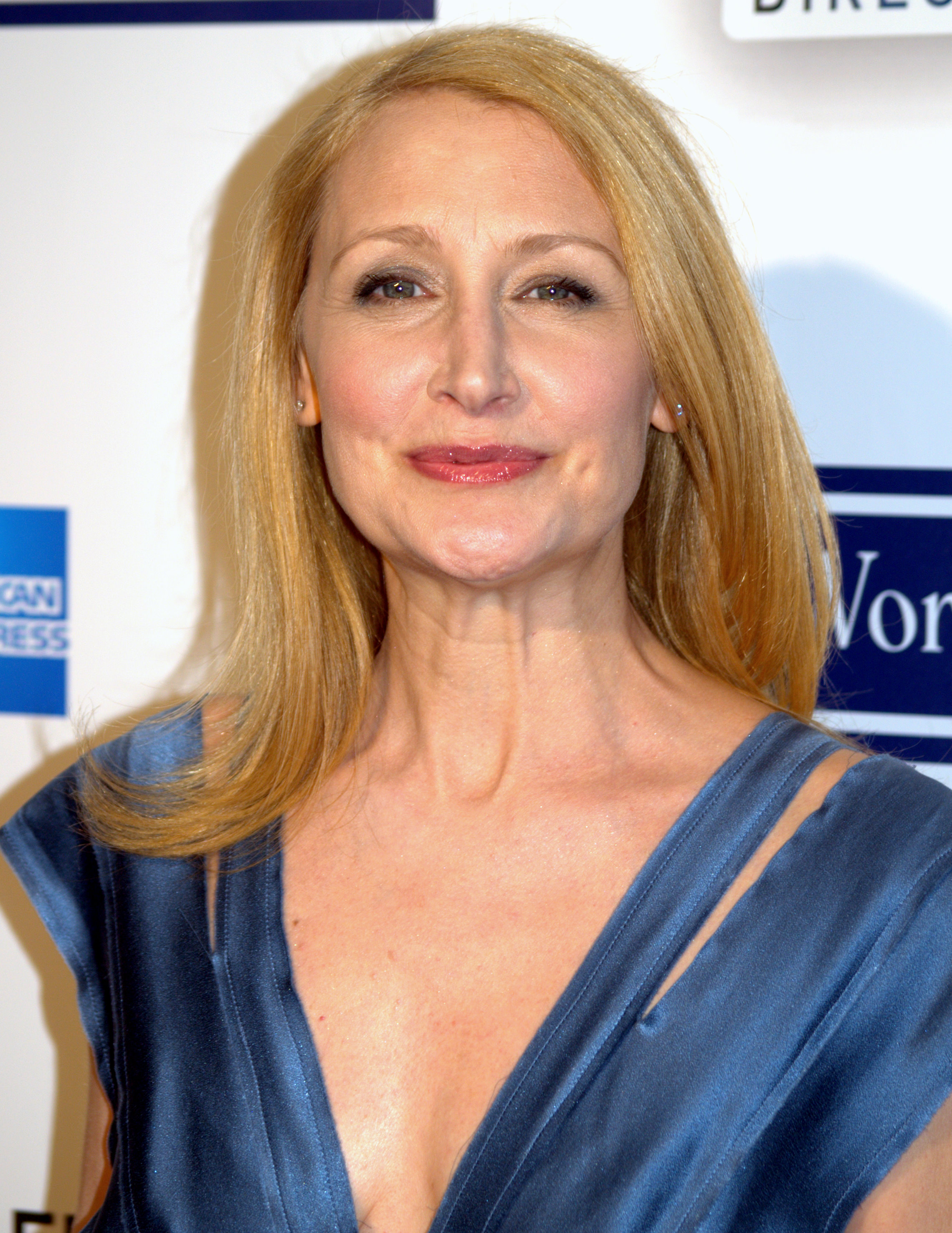
Patricia Clarkson

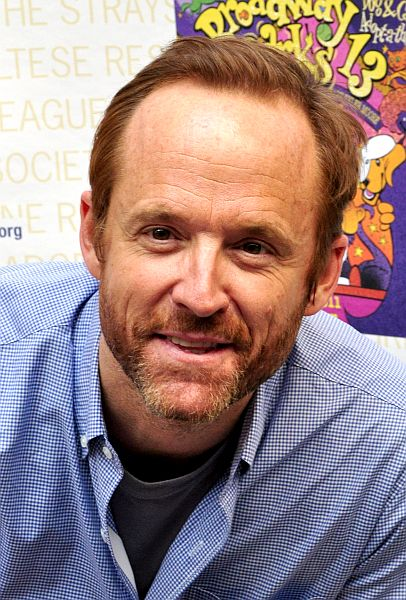
John Benjamin Hickey

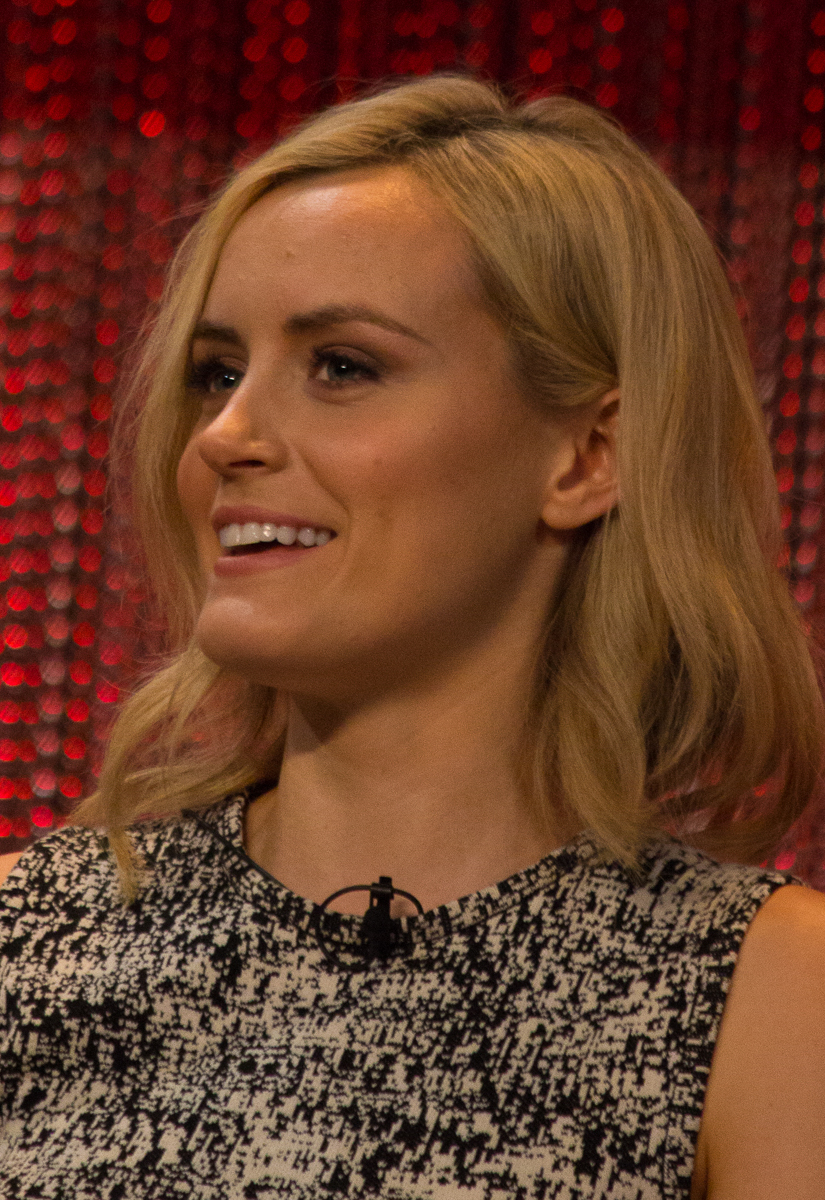
Taylor Schilling

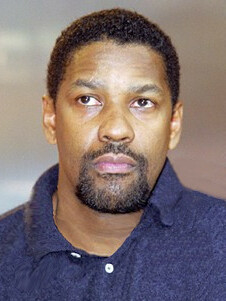
Denzel Washington

Joe Santo As detective Dennis Becker

Rockford Files

Name	Class year	School(s)	Degree(s)	Notability	Ref.
Philip Abbott		FC		Actor	
Carolyn Adams			M.S.W.	Dancer, choreographer teacher	
Alan Alda	1956	FC	B.A.	Six-time Emmy Award-winning and six-time Golden Globe-winning actor	
Trini Alvarado		FC		Actress	
Tracey Anarella		GSB	M.B.A.	Filmmaker	
Sherry Britton	1982	Law	B.L.	Burlesque performer and model	
Hilarie Burton	2000 (DNG)	FC	—N/a	Actress	
Thomas Calabro	1981	FC	B.A.	Actor	
Joshua Caldwell	2006	FC	B.A.	Director	
Kate Morgan Chadwick		FC	B.A.	Actress, singer	
Patricia Clarkson	1982	FC	B.A.	Academy Award-nominated actress	
Bud Collyer		Law	J.D.	Radio and game show presenter	
David Copperfield	1975 (DNG)	FC	—N/a	Illusionist, actor	
John DeLuca	2008	FC	B.A.	Actor	
Tommy Dorfman	2015	FC	B.A.	Actor	
Megan Fairchild				Ballerina	
Alison Fraser	2010	GSAS	M.A.	Actress	
Betty Gilpin	2008	FC	B.A.	Actress	
Sasha K. Gordon	2012	FC	B.S.	Actress	
Dan Grimaldi	1966	FC	B.A.	Actor	
Miles Gutierrez-Riley	2020	FC	B.A.	Actor	
Regina Hall	1992	FC	B.A.	Actress	
Kenneth Harlan		FC		Silent film actor	
Pat Harrington Jr.	1950	FC	B.A.	Actor	
Jonathan Harris	1934	PHC	MPharm	Actor	
John Benjamin Hickey	1985	FC	B.A.	Tony Award-winning actor	
Raúl Juliá	DNG	FC	—N/a	Actor	
Bob Keeshan	1951	UGE	B.S.	Actor, writer, producer	
Karen Kopins	1981	MC		Actress	
Irving Lazar		FC		Talent Agent	
Robert Sean Leonard	1990	FC	B.A.	Tony Award-winning actor	
Lou Liberatore	1981	FC	B.A.	Tony Award-nominated actor	
Heather Lind	2005	FC	B.A.	Actress	
Susan Lucci	1968	MC	B.A.	Actress	
Mike Mazurki		Law	J.D.	Actor	
Dylan McDermott	1983	FC	B.A.	Actor	
Michaela McManus	2005	FC	B.A.	Actress	
Lara Jill Miller	1994	Law	J.D.	Actress	
Ilan Mitchell-Smith	1997	GSAS	M.A.	Actor	
Brianne Moncrief	2005	FC	B.A.	Actress	
Paul Morrissey	DNG	FC	—N/a	Film director	
Robert Mulligan	1948	FC	B.A.	Film director	
Dan Naturman		Law	J.D.	Comedian	
Edmond O'Brien		FC	—N/a	Academy Award-winning and two-time Golden Globe-winning actor	
Annie Parisse	1997	FC	B.A.	Actress	
Denise Pence	2000	FC	B.A.	Actress	
Greg Poehler	2000	Law	J.D.	Actor	
Aaron Rhyne	2002	FC	B.A.	Video designer	
Lea Salonga	2000 (DNG)	FC	—N/a	Actress and singer	
Taylor Schilling	2006	FC	B.A.	Actress	
John Scurti	1987	FC	B.A.	Actor	
Amanda Seyfried	2003 (DNG)	FC	—N/a	Academy Award-nominated actress	
Raymond Siller	1960	FC	B.A.	Television writer	
Karina Smirnoff		FC	B.A.	Professional dancer	
Hunter Tylo	1988–1990 (DNG)	FC	—N/a	Actress, former model	
Amirah Vann	2002	FC	B.A.	Actress, singer	
Denzel Washington	1977	FC	B.A.	Academy Award, Golden Globe, and Tony-winning actor	
Julie White	1982 (DNG)	FC	—N/a	Tony Award-winning actress	
Virginia Williams		FC	B.A.	Actress	

=== Music ===
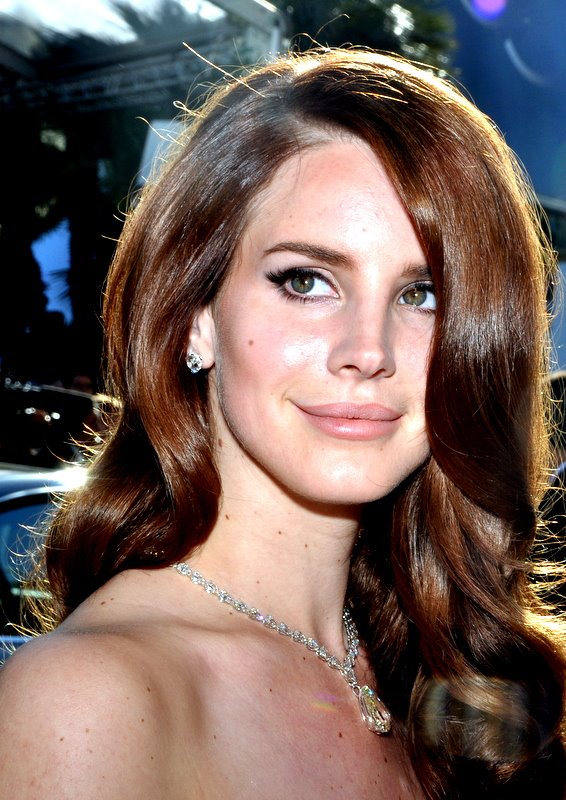
Lana Del Rey

Name	Class year	School(s)	Degree(s)	Notability	Ref.
Lana Cantrell	1994	Law	J.D.	Grammy Award-nominated Australian singer	
Graham Clarke	1994	GSAS	M.A.	Children's music singer-songwriter	
Lana Del Rey	2008	FC	B.A.	BRIT Award-winning and Grammy-nominated singer and songwriter	
Kevin Devine	2001	FC	B.A.	Singer-songwriter	
Faith Evans	1991 (DNG)	FC	—N/a	Singer, songwriter	
Norman Frauenheim		FC		Pianist	
Cathie Ryan		FC		Celtic musician	
Alice Smith	1999	FC	B.A.	Grammy Award-nominated singer	

== Government and politics ==
=== Heads of state and government ===
Name	Class year	School(s)	Degree(s)	Notability	Ref.
Hage Geingob	1970	FC	B.A.	First prime minister of Namibia following its independence; third president of Namibia	
Donald Trump	1964–1966 (attended)	FC	—	45th president of the United States (attended Fordham before transferring to the Wharton School and graduating in 1968)	

=== Governors of the United States ===
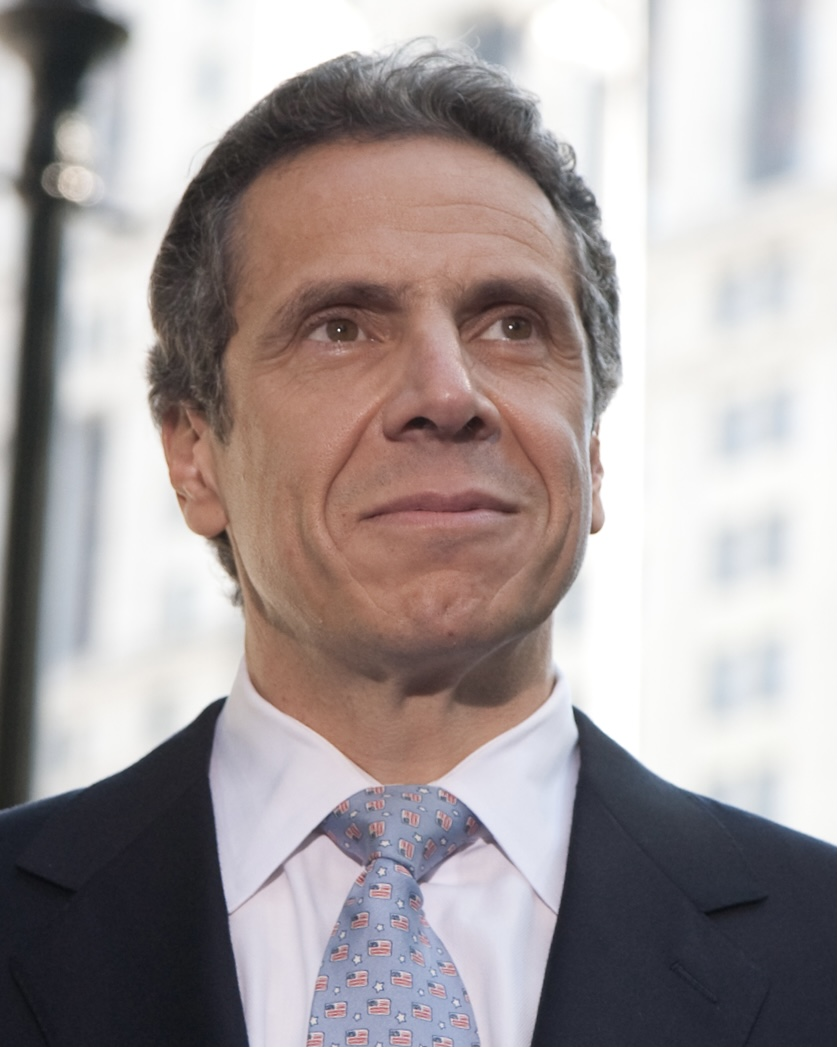
Andrew Cuomo

Name	Class year	School(s)	Degree(s)	Notability	Ref.
Andrew Cuomo	1979	FC	B.A.	Governor of New York State (2011–2021) and former U.S. Secretary of Housing and Urban Development under President Bill Clinton	
Martin H. Glynn	1914	FC	B.A.	Governor of New York State	
Tim Murray		FC		71st lieutenant governor of Massachusetts	
Malcolm Wilson	1933, 1936	FC, Law	B.S., J.D.	Governor of New York (1973–1975)	

=== United States executive branch officials ===
==== Cabinet members ====
Name	Class year	School(s)	Degree(s)	Notability	Ref.
John E. Potter	1977	FC	B.S.	U.S. Postmaster General and CEO of the U.S. Postal Service	

==== Cabinet-level officers ====
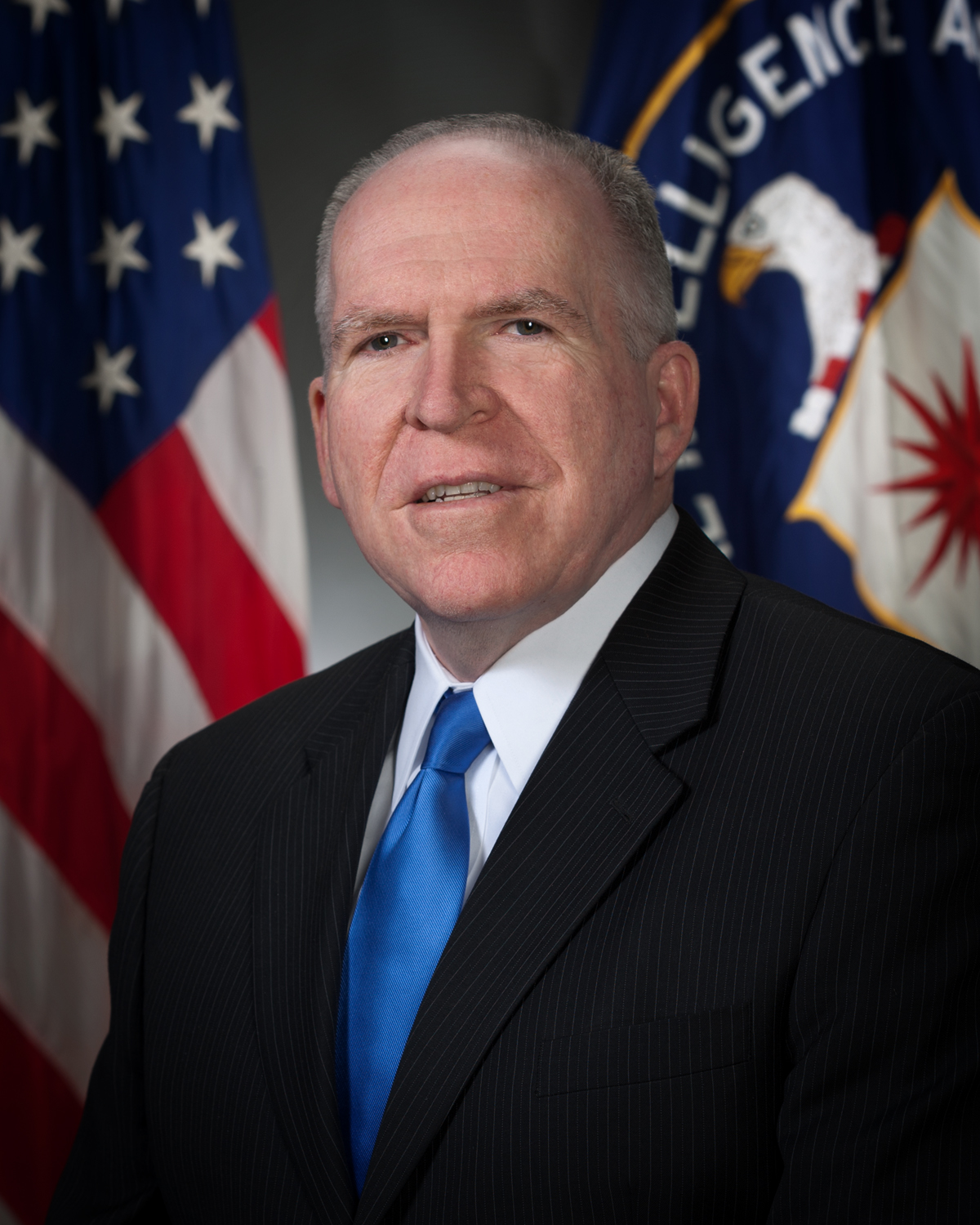
John O. Brennan

Name	Class year	School(s)	Degree(s)	Notability	Ref.
John O. Brennan	1977	FC	B.A.	Deputy National Security Advisor for Homeland Security (2009–2013) and CIA director under President Barack Obama	

==== Agency heads and subordinate officers ====
Name	Class year	School(s)	Degree(s)	Notability	Ref.
William J. Casey	1934	FC	B.S.	U.S. director of Central Intelligence (1981–1987)	
E. Gerald Corrigan	1965, 1971	GSAS	M.A., PhD	Former president of Federal Reserve Bank of New York	
Carmen Fariña		GE	M.A.	New York City Schools chancellor; head of the New York City Department of Education	

- Dennis Walcott, chancellor of the New York City Department of Education

==== White House staff ====
Name	Class year	School(s)	Degree(s)	Notability	Ref.
Ann McLaughlin Korologos	1963	MC	B.A.	United States Secretary of Labor (1987–1989)	
John N. Mitchell	1913	Law	J.D.	U.S. attorney general under President Richard Nixon, figure in Watergate scandal	
Bernard M. Shanley	1938	Law	B.L.	Deputy chief of staff and White House counsel to President Dwight D. Eisenhower	

=== Military ===
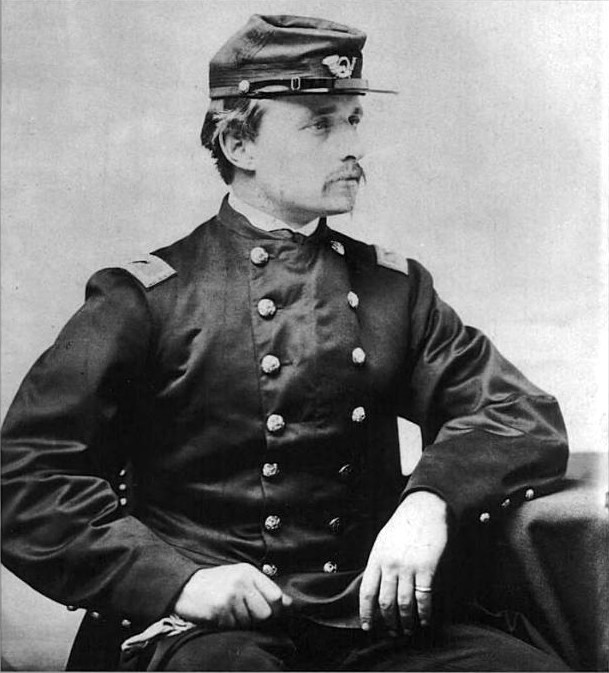
Robert Gould Shaw

Name	Class year	School(s)	Degree(s)	Notability	Ref.
Gen. Jack Keane	1966	FC	B.S.	Retired four-star general and former vice chief of staff of the United States Army	
Martin T. McMahon	1855	SJC, Law	B.L.	Bvt. major general, United States Army, recipient of the Medal of Honor, United States ambassador to Paraguay, New York state senator, New York state assemblyman	
Robert C. Murray	1968	FC		U.S. soldier, recipient of Medal of Honor	
John Morrison Oliver		SJC		Union general during the American Civil War	
Robert Gould Shaw	1850–51	SJC		Colonel, United States Army, commander of the 54th Massachusetts Infantry Regiment	

=== Judges ===
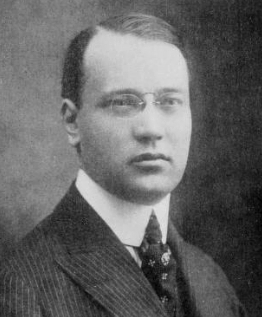
Salvatore A. Cotillo

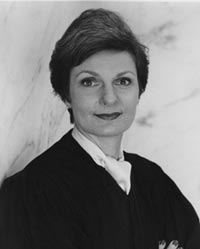
Loretta Preska

Name	Class year	School(s)	Degree(s)	Notability	Ref.
William G. Bassler	1960	FC	B.A.	Judge, United States District Court for the District of New Jersey	
Vincent L. Briccetti	1978	Law	J.D.	Judge, U.S. District Court for the Southern District of New York	
Robert J. Callahan	1955	Law	J.D.	Chief justice of the Connecticut Supreme Court (1996–99)	
Claire C. Cecchi	1989	Law	J.D.	Judge, U.S. District Court for the District of New Jersey	
Denny Chin	1978	Law	J.D.	Judge, U.S. Court of Appeals for the Second Circuit	
John William Clancy	1909, 1912	FC, Law	B.A., LL.B.	Judge, United States District Court for the Southern District of New York	
Salvatore A. Cotillo	1911	Law	J.D.	Italian-born New York lawyer and politician; first Italian-American to serve in both houses of the New York State Legislature, and the first to serve as justice of the New York State Supreme Court	
Kevin Duffy	1958	Law	J.D.	U.S. District Court for the Southern District of New York	
Claire Eagan	1976	Law	J.D.	Chief judge, U.S. District Court for the Northern District of Oklahoma	
David Norton Edelstein		FC, Law	B.S., M.A.	U.S. federal judge	
Peter T. Farrell	1925	Law	J.D.	Judge who presided over the trial of bank robber Willie Sutton	
James Thomas Foley	1931	FC	B.A.	Judge, United States District Court for the Northern District of New York	
Arthur Gonzalez	1982	Law	J.D.	Judge, U.S. Bankruptcy Court (1995–present); presided over Enron Corporation and WorldCom bankruptcies	
Denis Reagan Hurley	1966	Law	J.D.	Judge, U.S. District Court of the Eastern District of New York	
Irving Kaufman	1931	Law	J.D.	Chief judge, U.S. Court of Appeals for the Second Circuit	
John F. Keenan	1954	Law	J.D.	Judge, U.S. District Court for the Southern District of New York	
Paul Joseph Kelly Jr.	1967	Law	J.D.	Judge, U.S. Court of Appeals for the Tenth Circuit	
Vincent L. Leibell	1908	Law	LL.B.	U.S. federal judge	
Barbara Lenk	1972	FC	B.A.	Associate justice of the Massachusetts Supreme Judicial Court	
Gerald McLaughlin	1914	FC	B.A.	Judge, United States Court of Appeals for the Third Circuit	
Joseph M. McLaughlin	1959	Law	J.D.	Judge, U.S. Court of Appeals for the Second Circuit (1990 – August 8, 2013)	
Kevin Michael Moore	1976	Law	J.D.	Judge, U.S. District Court for the Southern District of Florida	
William Hughes Mulligan	1939, 1942	FC, Law	B.S., J.D.	Judge, U.S. Court of Appeals for the Second Circuit (1971–1981)	
Gregory Francis Noonan	1928	Law	LL.B.	Judge, United States District Court for the Southern District of New York (1950–1964)	
Marilyn Hall Patel	1963	Law	J.D.	Judge, U.S. District Court for the Northern District of California	
Loretta A. Preska	1973	Law	J.D.	Judge, U.S. District Court for the Southern District of New York	
Jaime Rios	1977	Law	J.D.	Judge, Queens County Supreme Court	
Cathy Seibel	1985	Law	J.D.	Judge, U.S. District Court for the Southern District of New York	

=== United States Congress ===
==== U.S. senators ====
Name	Class year	School(s)	Degree(s)	Notability	Ref.
Brien McMahon	1924	FC	B.A.	U.S. senator, Connecticut (1945–1952)	
Edward Murphy Jr.	1857	SJC		U.S. senator, New York (1893–1899)	
Malcolm Smith		FC	B.S.	U.S. senator, New York 10th District (2000–02), 14th District (2003–14)	

==== U.S. representatives ====
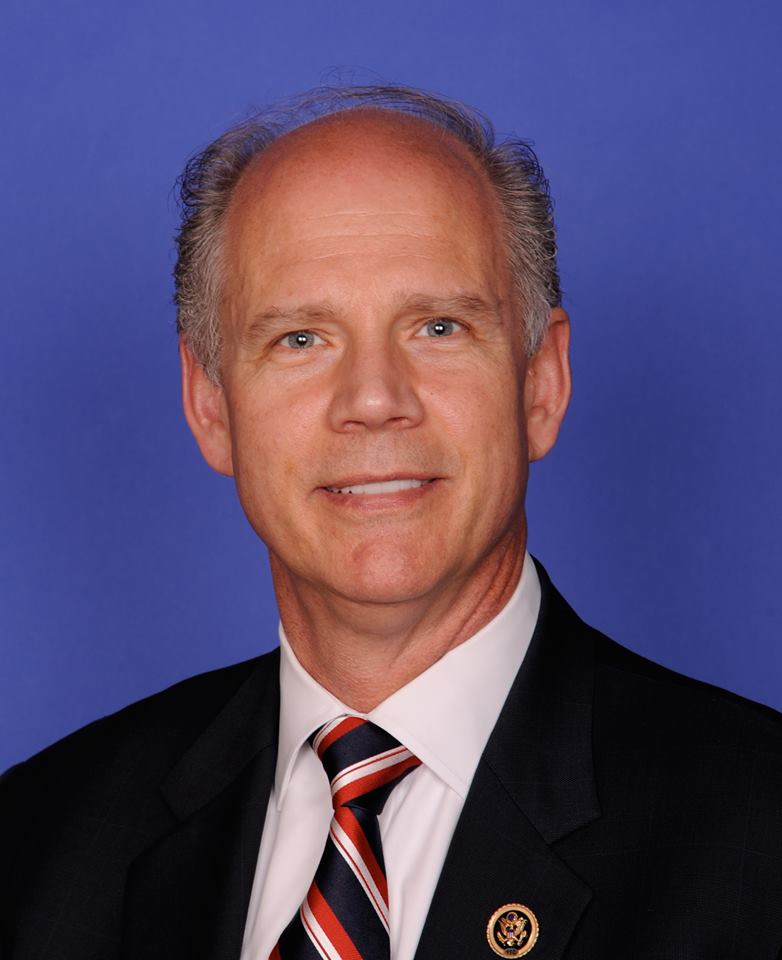
Dan Donovan

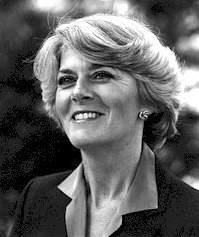
Geraldine Ferraro

Name	Class year	School(s)	Degree(s)	Notability	Ref.
Hugh Joseph Addonizio	1939	FC		Member of U.S. House of Representatives, New Jersey (1949–62)	
Loring M. Black Jr.	1907	FC		Member of the U.S. House of Representatives, New York (1911–23)	
Joseph Cao	1995	GSAS	M.A.	Member of the U.S. House of Representatives, Louisiana (2009–11)	
Dan Donovan	1988	Law	J.D.	Member of U.S. House of Representatives, New York's 11th district (2015–)	
Francis Edwin Dorn	1932, 1935	FC, Law	B.A., B.L.	Member of the U.S. House of Representatives (1953–61)	
Geraldine Ferraro	1960	Law	J.D.	Member of the U.S. House of Representatives (1979–85) and first female vice presidential candidate of a major political party	
Vito Fossella	1993	Law	J.D.	Member of the U.S. House of Representatives (1998–2008)	
Robert Giaimo	1941	FC		Member of the U.S. House of Representatives (1959–81)	
James Kerrigan		SJC		Member of U.S. House of Representatives, New York's 4th congressional district (1861–63)	
Jerry Nadler	1977	Law		Member of the U.S. House of Representatives (1993–present)	
Donald Lawrence O'Toole	1925	Law	J.D.	Member of the U.S. House of Representatives, New York's 13th district (1945–53)	
Bill Pascrell Jr.	1959, 1961	FC, GSAS		Member of the U.S. House of Representatives (1997–2024)	
Thomas Vincent Quinn	1924	Law	B.L.	Member of the U.S. House of Representatives (1949–51)	
James P. Scoblick	1930	Law		Member of the U.S. House of Representatives (1946–49)	
Adam Smith	1987	FC		Member of the U.S. House of Representatives, Washington state (1997–present)	

=== Other U.S. political figures ===
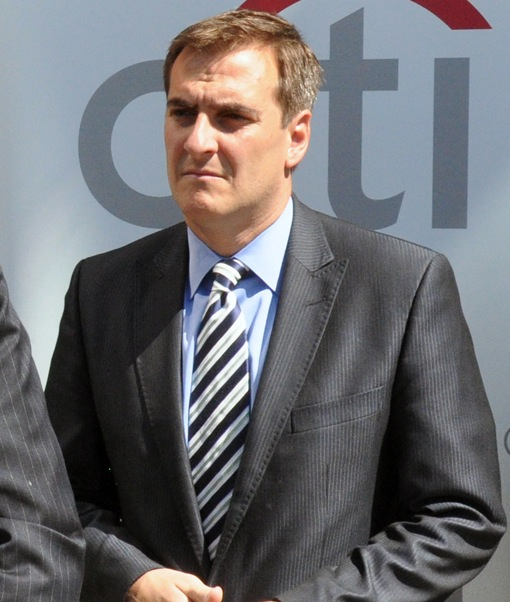
Michael Gianaris

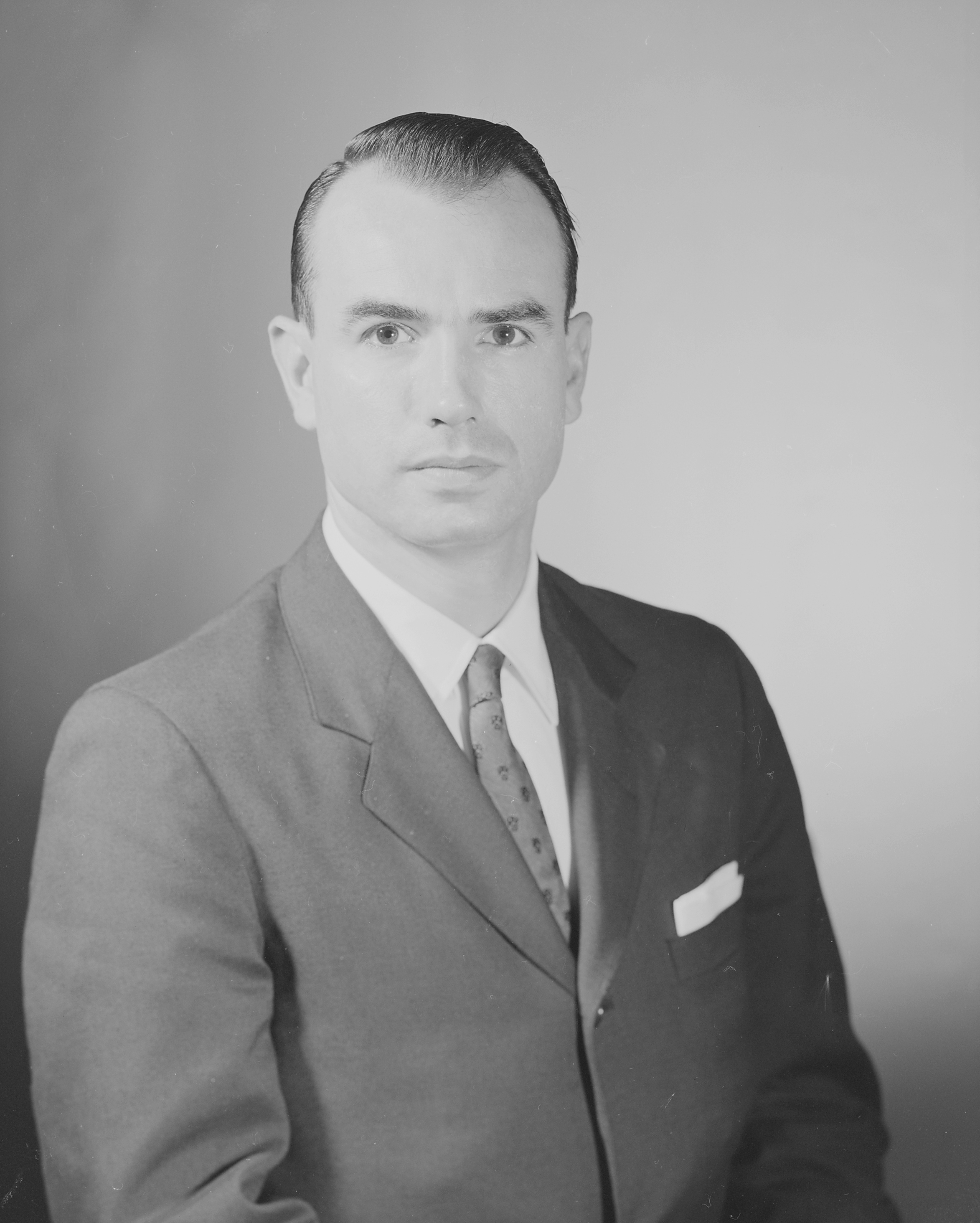
G. Gordon Liddy

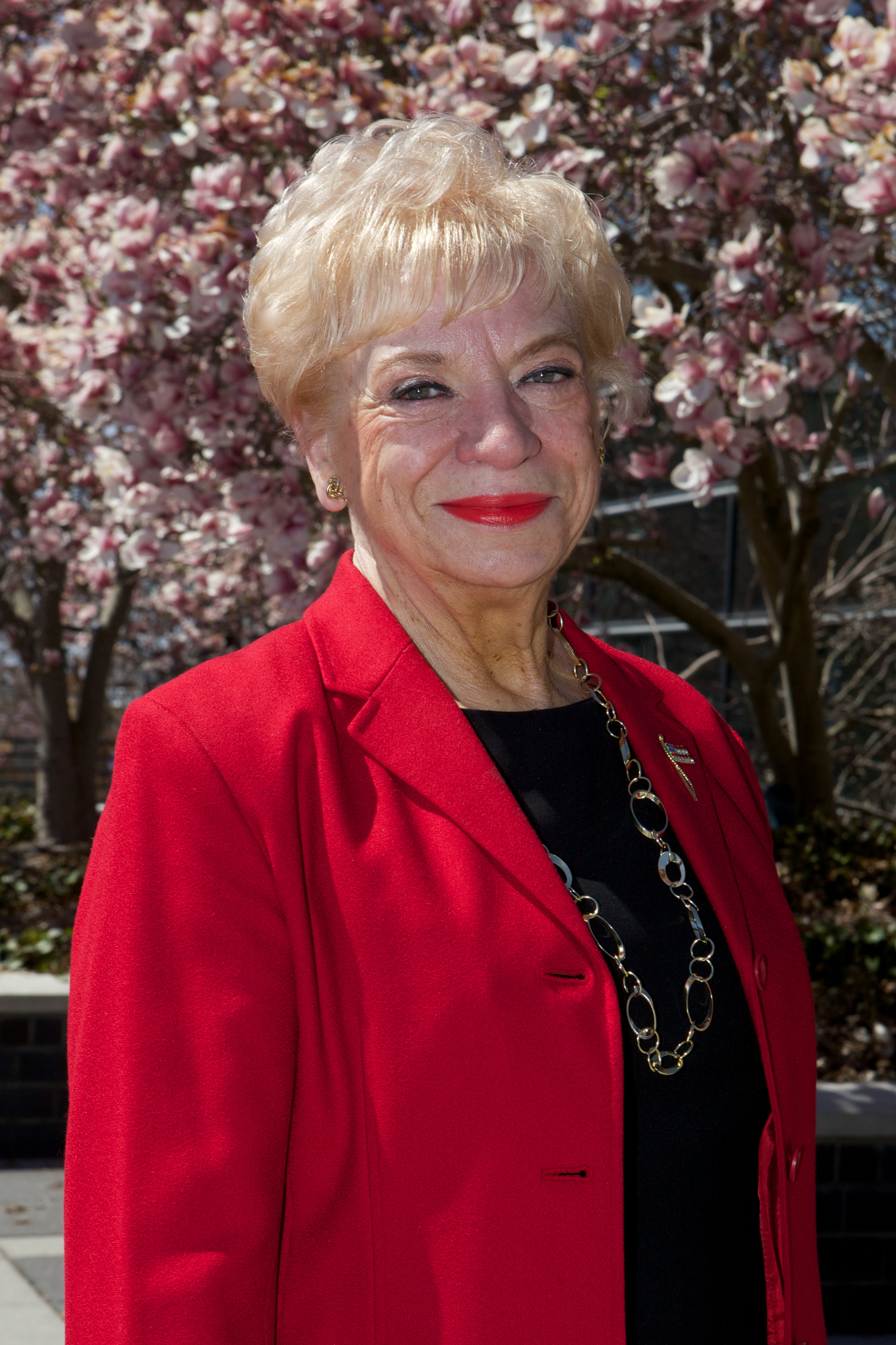
Joan Voss

Name	Class year	School(s)	Degree(s)	Notability	Ref.
Thomas J. Abinanti	1968	FC	B.A.	Member of the New York State Assembly, 92nd district	
Bryan Anderson				Former alderman of New Haven and Milford	
Rob Astorino	1989	FC	B.A.	County executive of Westchester County	
Adrian A. Basora	1960	FC	B.A.	Diplomat, United States Ambassador to the Czech Republic under George H. W. Bush	
Gennaro Bizzarro	1997	FC	B.A.	Member of the Connecticut Senate	
Richard Bond	1972	FC	B.A.	Chairman of the Republican National Committee (1992–93)	
Neil Breslin	1964	FC	B.S.	New York state senator, New York 42nd District (1997–2002), 46th District (2003–12), 44th District (2013–)	
Jack Caulfield				Security operative and law enforcement officer of the Richard Nixon administration	
Carmine DeSapio	1931	FC	B.A.	Secretary of state of New York (1955–59)	
Sylvester A. Dineen	1920	FC	B.A.	Member of the New York State Assembly	
Joseph F. Finnegan	1931	Law	LL.B.	Director of the Federal Mediation and Conciliation Service	
Joan Fitz-Gerald		Law	J.D.	President of the Senate, Colorado (2001–07)	
Michael Gianaris	1990	FC	B.S.	New York state senator, New York 12th District (2011–)	
John F. Good	1954	FC		FBI agent; created the Abscam sting operation in the late 1970s and early 1980s which led to the arrest and conviction of several elected officials at the local, state and federal level, which was portrayed in the 2013 film American Hustle	
John Granville	1997	FC		United States Agency for International Development diplomat assassinated in Sudan	
Louis F. Haffen	1875	SJC	B.A.	First borough president of the Bronx	
George Harlamon		FC	B.S.	Mayor of Waterbury, Connecticut, (1969–1970)	
Vincent R. Impellitteri	1924	Law	J.D.	101st mayor of New York City	
John N. Irwin II	1941	Law	J.D.	Diplomat, aide to Douglas MacArthur	
Ellen Jaffee	1980	GE	M.S.	Member of the New York State Assembly, 97th district	
G. Gordon Liddy	1952	FC		Political operative for President Richard Nixon, leader of the Watergate scandal, political pundit and radio show host	
William C. McCreery	1919	Law		Lawyer and member of the New York State Assembly	
Ray McGovern	1961, 1962	FC, GSAS		Former CIA analyst, political activist	
Judith McHale	1979	Law	J.D.	Under Secretary of State for Public Diplomacy and Public Affairs (2009–11)	
Liam McLaughlin	1989	FC	B.S.	Yonkers City Council president	
Rick Merkt	1975	Law	J.D.	Member of New Jersey General Assembly, 25th district	
Louis Niñé	1950	FC	B.S.	Politician	
James Oddo		FC	B.A.	Borough president of Staten Island	
Cesar A. Perales	1965	Law	J.D.	65th secretary of state of New York	
Phelps Phelps	1925	Law	J.D.	U.S. ambassador to the Dominican Republic	
Adam Clayton Powell IV	1988	Law	J.D.	Member of the New York State Assembly, 68th district (2001–10)	
Daniel Ragsdale		Law	J.D.	Deputy director of U.S. Immigration and Customs Enforcement	
Loret Miller Ruppe		MC		U.S. ambassador to Norway, director of Peace Corps	
Holly Schepisi	1997	Law	J.D.	Member of the New Jersey General Assembly, 39th district	
Jo Anne Simon		Law		Member of the New York State Assembly, 52nd district	
Aravella Simotas	1999, 2002	FC, Law		Member of the New York State Assembly (2011–)	
William F. Smith	1922	Law	LL.B.	Member of the New York State Assembly	
Austin Tobin	1928	Law		Executive director of the Port of New York Authority (1942–1972)	
Joan Voss	1998	GSAS	Ed.D.	Member of New Jersey General Assembly (2004–2012)	
Frank Zullo				Mayor of Norwalk, Connecticut (1965–1971)	

=== International political figures ===
Name	Class year	School(s)	Degree(s)	Notability	Ref.
Jesus Estanislao			M.S.	Secretary of Finance of the Philippines 1990–1992	
Étienne-Théodore Pâquet		SJC		French-Canadian civil law notary	

== Law ==
Name	Class year	School(s)	Degree(s)	Notability	Ref.
Francis W.H. Adams	1928	Law	J.D.	Lawyer, New York City Police commissioner (1954–55)	
James Kenneth Campbell		Law	B.A., J.D.	Lawyer, village justice of Saltaire, New York	
Eunice Carter	1932	Law	J.D.	Lawyer	
Robert J. Cleary	1980	Law	J.D.	U.S. attorney for the District of New Jersey (1999–2002)	
James B. Donovan	1937	FC	B.A.	Negotiated the exchange of captured U-2 pilot Francis Gary Powers and American student Frederic Pryor for Soviet spy Rudolf Abel; negotiated the 1962 release and return of 9,703 prisoners held by Cuba after the failed Bay of Pigs Invasion; portrayed by Tom Hanks in the 2015 film Bridge of Spies	
Walter A. Lynch	1915, 1918	FC, Law	B.A., J.D.	New York Supreme Court justice	
Dudley Field Malone		Law		Lawyer, activist	
William R. Meagher	1924, 1927	FC, Law		Former senior partner, Skadden, Arps, Slate, Meagher & Flom	
Ruth Whitehead Whaley	1924	Law		First African-American woman to be admitted to the New York State and North Carolina Bar Associations	
Thomas F. Woodlock	1906	Law		Editor of the Wall Street Journal and US Interstate Commerce Commission commissioner	

== Media and communications ==
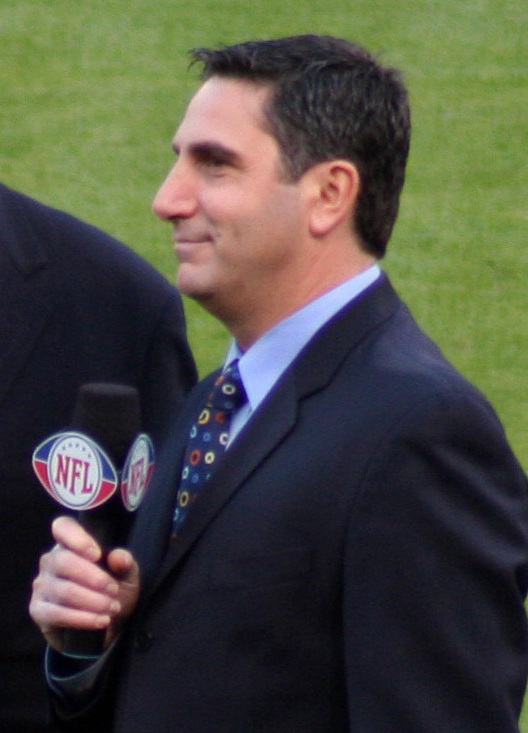
Bob Papa

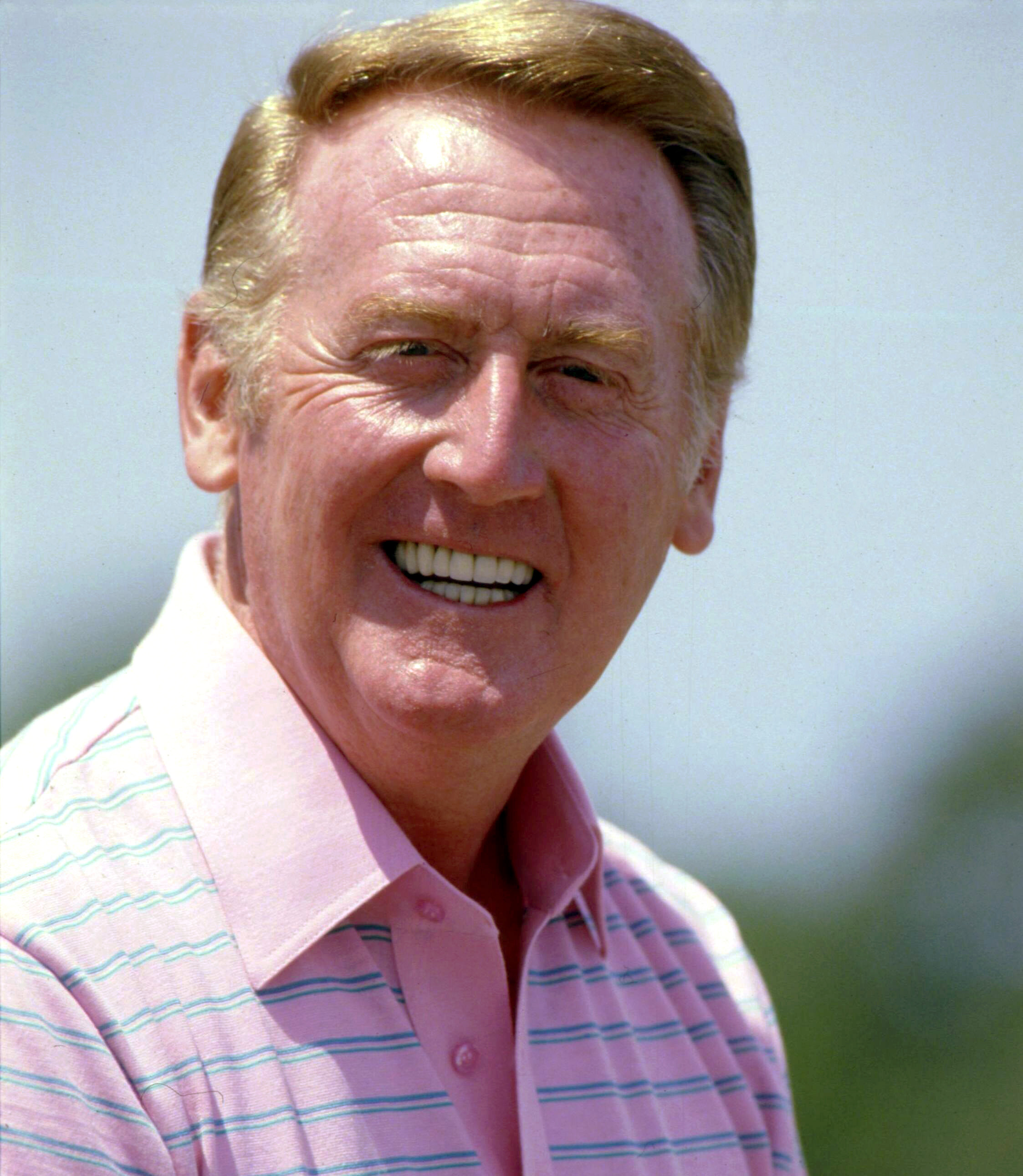
Vin Scully

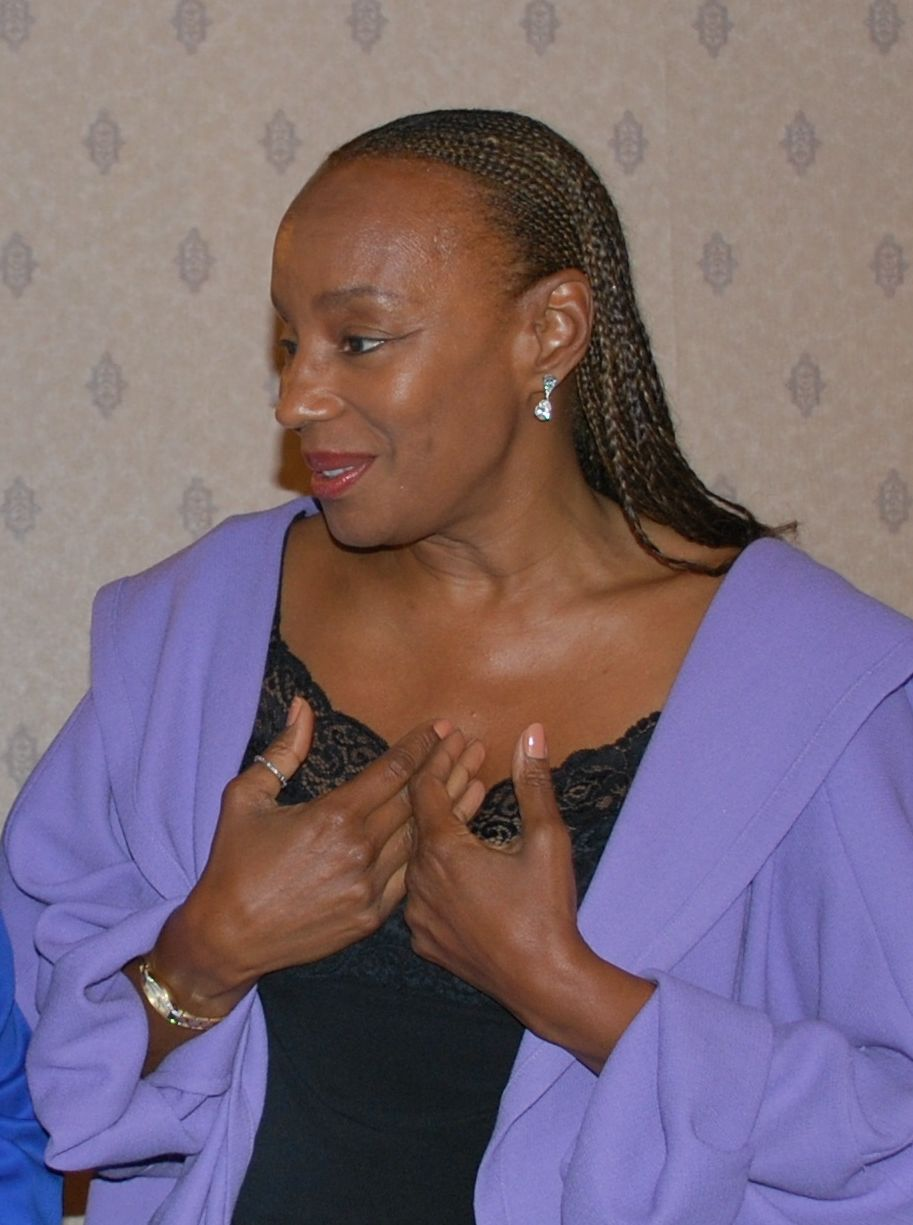
Susan L. Taylor

Name	Class year	School(s)	Degree(s)	Notability	Ref.
John Andariese	1960	GSB	CBA	Radio color commentator for the New York Knicks	
Louis Boccardi	1958	FC	B.A.	Retired president of The Associated Press	
Mike Breen	1983	FC		Sportscaster for NBA games on ABC and ESPN as well as New York Knicks games on MSG Network; 2020 recipient of Curt Gowdy Media Award	
Dick Brennan	1983	GSB	B.S.	WCBS-TV and WLNY-TV anchor	
Patti Ann Browne	1987	FC	B.A.	Fox News anchor and reporter	
Chris Carrino	1992	GSB	CBA	Radio play-by-play announcer for the New Jersey Nets	
John Chervokas	1959	FC		Advertising writer and executive	
Chip Cipolla	1950	FC		Radio announcer for the New York Football Giants and other professional sports teams in the New York City area	
Christopher Cuomo	1995	Law	J.D.	Emmy Award-winning correspondent for ABC News	
Jack Curry	1986	FC	B.A.	Baseball columnist and reporter for The New York Times	
Arthur Daley	1926	FC		Sportswriter; first Fordham graduate to win a Pulitzer Prize	
Spero Dedes	2001	FC	B.A.	Announcer for CBS and Turner; former radio play-by-play announcer for the New York Knicks and Los Angeles Lakers	
Scott Detrow	2007	FC	B.A.	NPR political correspondent and podcast host	
Lauren Duca	2013	FC	B.A.	Journalist	
Jim Dwyer	1979	FC	B.S.	Two-time Pulitzer Prize-winning journalist	
Jack Ford		Law	J.D.	Journalist	
Pete Fornatale	1967	FC	B.A.	Radio personality and music historian	
Alice Gainer	2004	FC	B.A.	WCBS-TV and WLNY-TV anchor	
John T. Georgopoulos	1986	FC	B.S.	Award-winning fantasy sports journalist and SiriusXM radio personality	
John Giannone	1995	FC	B.A.	Reporter and play-by-play announcer for MSG Networks	
Richard Hake	1991	FC	B.A.	Reporter for WNYC and host of NPR's Morning Edition	
Amanda Hearst	2008	FC	B.A.	Marketing editor of Marie Claire	
Beth Karas		Law	J.D.	Attorney and TV commentator who worked as a senior reporter for truTV	
Michael Kay	1982	FC	B.A.	Television play-by-play announcer for the New York Yankees; host of CenterStage and The Michael Kay Show	
Greg Kelly	1991	FC	B.A.	News anchor, Good Day New York	
Paul La Rosa	1975	FC	B.A.	Producer, CBS News; former reporter, NY Daily News; four-time Emmy Award winner, Peabody Award, duPont Award, 2 Gracie Awards, 2 Edward R. Murrow Awards, 2 NY Press Club Awards; author of 4 true crime books, a memoir and a novel	
Tom Leykis	1972–73 (DNG)	FC	—N/a	Talk radio personality	
Dotty Lynch	1968	GSSS	M.S.	Journalist, political pollster	
Lori Majewski	1993	FC	B.A.	Entertainment writer	
Patrick Range McDonald		FC	B.A.	Journalist	
Connell McShane	1999	FC	B.A.	Anchor for Fox Business Network; former news anchor for Imus in the Morning and Bloomberg Television	
Malcolm Moran	1975	FC	B.A.	Sportswriter for USA Today, USBWA Hall of Famer; recipient of the 2007 Curt Gowdy Media Award	
Lynn Neary	1971	TMC	B.A.	Award-winning NPR journalist	
Olivia Nuzzi	2013 (DNG)	FC	—N/a	Journalist	
Charles Osgood	1954	FC	B.S.	Three-time Emmy Award and two-time Peabody Award-winning journalist for CBS, Radio Hall of Famer	
Kimberly Osorio	1995	FC	B.A.	The Source magazine editor-in-chief and VH1 television producer	
Bob Papa	1986	GSB	CBA	Radio play-by-play announcer for the New York Giants	
Tony Reali	2000	FC	B.A.	Host of ESPN's Around the Horn and "Statboy" on Pardon the Interruption	
Ryan Ruocco	2008	FC	B.A.	Announcer for ESPN; backup play-by-play voice of the New York Yankees and Brooklyn Nets; host of R2C2 podcast; former radio host for ESPN New York	
Lauren Scala	2004	FC	B.A.	Traffic reporter for Today in NY	
John Schaefer	1980	FC	B.A.	Music journalist for New York Public Radio and host of WNYC's New Sounds	
Vin Scully	1949	FC	B.A.	Emmy Award-winning sportscaster for the Los Angeles Dodgers; Baseball Hall of Fame; Radio Hall of Fame	
Justin Shackil	2009	FC	B.A.	Sportscaster for the New York Yankees	
Charlie Slowes	1983	FC		Radio play-by-play announcer for the Washington Nationals	
Susan L. Taylor	1989	FC	B.A.	Editor and journalist	
Loretta Tofani	1975	FC	B.A.	Pulitzer Prize-winning journalist	
Mike Walczewski	1979	FC	B.A.	Public address announcer for Madison Square Garden, the New York Knicks, and the New York Liberty	
Paul Wontorek	1994	FC	B.A.	Editor-in-chief of Broadway.com	
Mike Yam	2003	FC	B.A.	Host for Pac-12 Network and former ESPN sports anchor	

== Royalty ==
Name	Class year	School(s)	Degree(s)	Notability	Ref.
Archduchess Charlotte of Austria		GSSS		Daughter of Emperor Charles I of Austria	
Jazmin Grace Grimaldi	2014	GSB	B.S.	Daughter of Albert II, Prince of Monaco, granddaughter of Grace Kelly	

== Science and technology ==
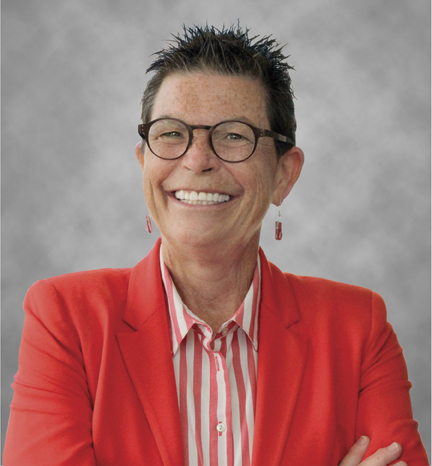
Susan Love

Name	Class year	School(s)	Degree(s)	Notability	Ref.
Mollie Beattie	1968	MC	B.A.	Nature conservationist	
Fred Berlin	1966	GSAS	M.S.	Psychiatrist and sexologist	
Jason Calcanis	1992	FC	B.A.	Internet entrepreneur; founder of Silicon Alley Reporter and Digital Coast Reporter	
Rita Charon	1970	FC	B.A.	Executive director of the Program in Narrative Medicine at Columbia University	
Gloria M. Coruzzi	1976	FC	B.S.	Molecular biologist and professor	
George Coyne, S.J.	1958	FC	B.S.	Astronomer, former director of the Vatican Observatory	
Ronald A. DePinho, M.D.	1977	FC	B.S.	President of The University of Texas MD Anderson Cancer Center	
Maureen Goodenow		FC	B.S.	Scientist and AIDS researcher	
Susan Love	1970	FC	B.S.	Surgeon, co-founder of National Breast Cancer Coalition	
Sean E. McCance	1987	FC	B.S.	Co-director of spine surgery in the Leni and Peter W. May Department of Orthopaedics, Mount Sinai Medical Center	
Colleen Plimpton		FC	B.S.	Horticulturalist	
Thomas D. Schiano	1979	FC	B.S.	Liver transplantation specialist	
Marie Taylor	1941	GSAS	PhD	Botanist	
Kenneth Thibodeau	1967		BA	Archivist	
Monica Turner	1980	FC	B.S.	Ecologist	
James Joseph Walsh	1884	SJC	PhD	Physician, author, encyclopedia contributor and science journalist	

== Sports ==
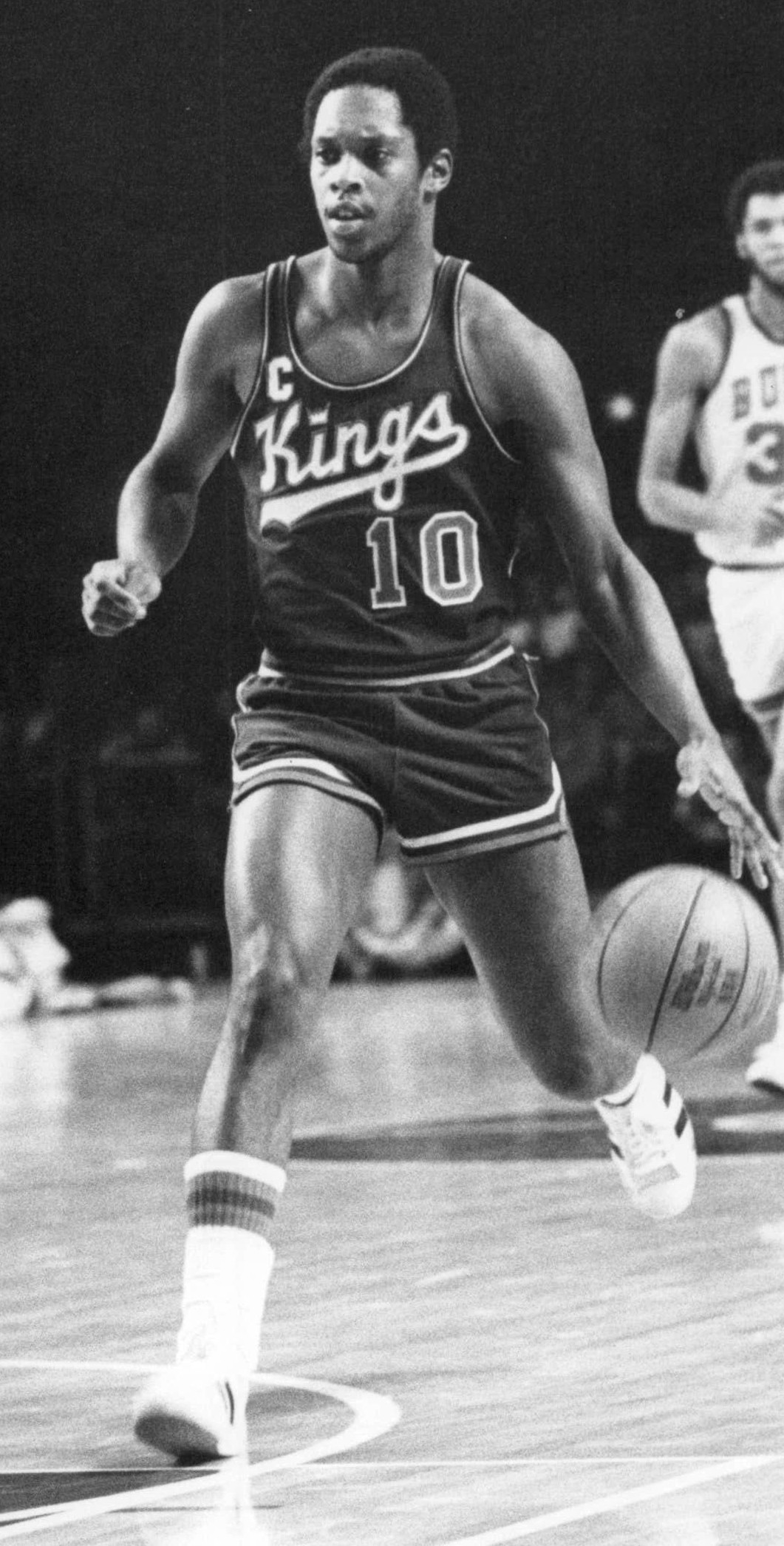
Nate Archibald

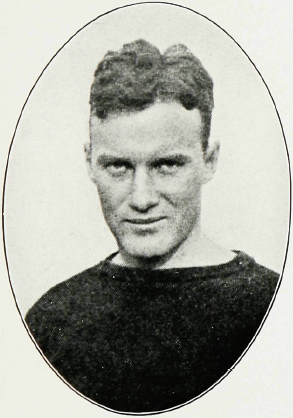
Frank Gargan

Name	Class year	School(s)	Degree(s)	Notability	Ref.
Jermaine Anderson	2006	FC		Canadian professional basketball player	
Nate Archibald	1990	GSAS	M.S.	Former NBA player	
Steve Bellán	1868	SJC		First Latin American to play Major League Baseball	
Hank Borowy	1939	FC	B.S.	MLB starting pitcher	
Sam Bower				Gridiron football player	
P.J. Carlesimo	1971	FC		College and professional basketball coach; Portland Trail Blazers, Golden State Warriors	
Peter A. Carlesimo	1940	FC		Former executive director, National Invitation Tournament	
Ken Charles	1973	FC		Former NBA basketball player, played for the Atlanta Hawks and Buffalo Braves	
Jack Coffey	1910	FC		Minor league baseball player; namesake of Coffey Field	
Tom Courtney	1955	FC		Two-time Olympic Games gold medalist, held world record in 880-yard run	
Ed Danowski	1934	FC		NFL player for the New York Giants	
Kevin Eakin	2004	FC		Professional football player	
Chase Edmonds	2018	FC		Professional football player	
Joelle Forte	2010	FC		Professional figure skater	
Ed Franco	1937	FC		Professional football player, one of the Seven Blocks of Granite	
Frankie Frisch	1920	FC	B.S.	Baseball Hall of Famer, nicknamed "The Fordham Flash"	
Kerri Gallagher	2011	FC	B.S.	Long-distance runner	
Frank Gargan	1910	FC		College football player and coach	
Howard Gargan	1908	FC		College football player and coach	
Eddie Gordon	2005	GSB	B.S.	The Ultimate Fighter 19 Finale winner, professional mixed martial artist	
Pete Harnisch	1987	FC		Former Major League All-Star pitcher	
Bob Hassmiller	1939	FC		Consensus Second Team All-American basketball player in 1939	
Harry Jacunski	1939	FC		NFL player, college football coach	
Aki Jones	2009	GSB	B.S.	NFL player, Washington Redskins	
Grant Kerr	2008	FC	B.S.	Scottish professional soccer player in Europe	
Jim Lansing	1943	FC		Football coach	
Vince Lombardi	1937	FC	B.S.	Football coach, Pro Football Hall of Famer, one of the Seven Blocks of Granite	
Nick Martinez	2012 (DNG)			Professional baseball pitcher	
Joe McCluskey	1933	FC	B.S.	Olympic Games bronze medalist, USATF Hall of Famer	
Ryan Meara	2012	GSB	B.S.	Soccer player, New York Red Bulls	
John Mulcahy	1894	SJC		Olympic Games gold and silver medalist	
Patrick Murray	2012	FC		NFL player	
Dan O'Sullivan	1990	FC		Former NBA journeyman	
Leo Paquin		FC		Football player, one of the Seven Blocks of Granite	
Howie Roseman	2000	Law		Manager of Philadelphia Eagles	
Dave Shean	1906	SJC		Major League Baseball second baseman	
John Skelton	2010	FC		Professional football player for the Cincinnati Bengals	
Jack Slattery	1901	SJC		Major League Baseball catcher	
Kurt Sohn				Former NFL player, New York Jets	
Tom Sullivan	1972			College basketball head coach for Southern New Hampshire University, Manhattan College, and University of Maryland, Baltimore County	
Walt Uzdavinis	1934	FC		NFL player	
Sara Whalen	2006	GSE		Former professional soccer player for the New York Power and US Women's National team	
Cary Williams	2003–04 (DNG)	FC	—N/a	NFL player	
Greg Wilson		FC		NFL player	
Alex Wojciechowicz	1938	FC		Pro Football Hall of Famer, College Football Hall of Famer, one of the Seven Blocks of Granite	
John Wolyniec	1999	FC		Major League Soccer player for the New York Red Bulls	
Vinnie Yablonski	1941–42 (DNG)	FC	—N/a	NFL player with the Chicago Cardinals	
Joe Zapustas	1933	FC		Major League Baseball player	

- Bob Berman, Major League Baseball catcher
- Bryant Dunston (2008), American-Armenian basketball player
- Javontae Hawkins (2017), basketball player in the Israeli Basketball Premier League

== Fictional ==
Name	Notability	Ref.
Jack Boyle	Character in Blue Bloods (television series)	
Ray Brocco	Character in The Good Shepherd (film, 2006)	
Adam Burton	Character in Little Manhattan (film, 2005)	
Dominick Carisi	Character in Law and Order: Special Victims Unit (television series)	
Pepper Cartwright	Character in Supreme Courtship (novel, 2008)	
Michael Clayton	Title character of Michael Clayton (film, 2007)	
Bryan Connerty	Character in Billions (television series)	
Michael J. Flaherty	Character in Spin City (television series)	
Mary Gilligan	Character in Shattered Vows (television film, 1984)	
Jacob Moore	Character in Wall Street: Money Never Sleeps (film, 2010)	
Nicole	Character in Whiplash (film, 2014)	
Annie Norris	Character in Life on Mars (television series)	
Dave Norris	Character in The Adjustment Bureau (film, 2011)	
Sonek Pran	A character in Star Trek: A Singular Destiny (novel, 2009)	
Erin Reagan	Character in Blue Bloods (television series)	
Samantha Reyes	Character in Daredevil (television series); wears a Fordham sweatshirt, implying she is an alumna	
Nick Rice	Character in Law Abiding Citizen (film, 2009)	
Frank Rossitano	Character on 30 Rock (television series), attended Fordham for a semester, but had to drop out when his mother became ill	
Jack Spaniel	Character on The Newsroom (television series)	
Bruno Tattaglia	Character in The Godfather (novel, 1969)	
Vinnie Terranova	Character in Wiseguy (television series)	

== See also ==
- Category:Fordham University alumni
- List of Fordham University School of Law alumni
- List of Fordham University faculty
- List of Fordham Rams in the NFL draft
