= Donna Redel =

- Occupations: Chair, Board of Commodity Exchange; Managing Director, World Economic Forum

Donna Redel is an American businesswoman, educator, and philanthropist.

== Education ==
Redel attended Barnard College (B.A. 1974), Columbia Business School (M.B.A. 1978) and Fordham University School of Law (J.D. 1995), where she later developed and taught a course on Risk Management and Derivatives. She currently teaches at Wharton, Fordham Law and Fordham Gabelli School a course on Blockchain-Crypto Currencies-Digital Assets and a second course at Fordham Law on Smart Contracts and DeFi. .

== Career ==
Redel has managed global organizations, working especially in financial performance and governance issues, for over 30 years. Redel began her career as an investment banker, and made history in 1992 when she became the only woman ever elected Chairman of the Board of Commodity Exchange, Inc. (COMEX). Completed during her tenure was a merger with the New York Mercantile Exchange, creating the world's largest physical commodity exchange. From 1994 – 2000 Redel served as Chief Information and Technology Officer for both the International and Derivatives divisions of Prudential Securities.

In 2000, Redel joined the World Economic Forum as Managing Director and Board Member. At the Forum Redel was directly responsible for the 1000 corporate members and the development of the Strategic Partners. Redel is known for growing a major portion of the Forum's income base while expanding both geographic and gender diversity.

In 2017, Redel added blockchain to her focus. She is a speaker at global conferences on regulatory and business issues, and is an advisor in the field. In 2019, Redel and Joyce Lai co-founded The Fordham Law Blockchain Regulatory Symposium:Regulation and Innovation. The inaugural Symposium, sponsored by Fordham Law School, was held on November 11.

Redel is a board member of NY Angels where she co-founded and co-chairs the Blockchain Committee and was former a member of both Women Corporate Directors and Golden Seeds – Angel Investors for Women Entrepreneurs. She is a member of The Council on Foreign Relations.

== Philanthropy and women's issues ==
Redel is an active philanthropist, advocating for women's health issues, financial literacy, and mentorship programs. She has served on various boards including the Smeal College of Business at Penn State University, the Alliance Française, Columbia University's Paris Alliance Program, the French Institute Alliance Francaise (FIAF), Jill-E Corp, The American Friends of the Musee d"Orsay, the MoMA Photography Committee, and the Network for Teaching Entrepreneurship. She is a member of the New York - Presbyterian Hospital Advisory Council, as well as its Dean's Council, and serves as President of its Lying-In Hospital executive committee. Redel founded the Women's Leadership Initiative at the World Economic Forum.
