= B.A. Van Sise =

American photographer

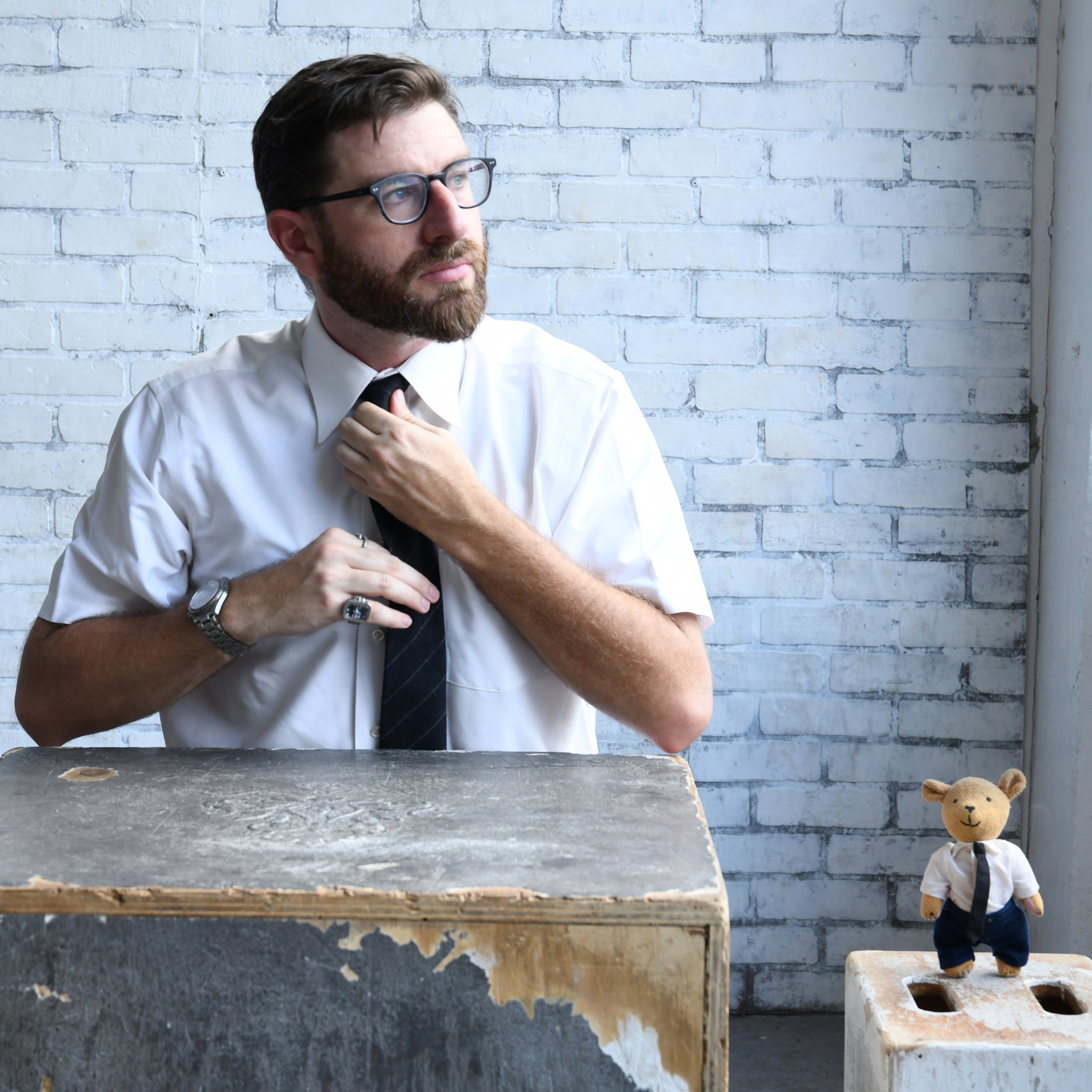
- Education: Fordham University
- Occupation: Photographer

B.A. Van Sise FRGS is an American curator, author, and photographic artist. He has worked as a travel photographer, and collections of his fine art photography have been exhibited in public installations by American museums.

== Career ==
Van Sise is a graduate of Fordham University, with degrees in both Visual Arts and Modern Languages. He has produced photo essays for publications including the Village Voice. Van Sise is also a travel photographer, through various publications and as a Nikon/AFAR travel photography ambassador.

Van Sise has collaborated extensively with Poster House, having curated The Future Was Then, which opened Fall 2025, and Just Say Nyet, opening Fall 2027.

== Solo exhibitions ==
In 2016 he assembled the exhibition entitled Children of Grass. He started the project by taking photographs of contemporary well-known poets in elaborate scenes and poses, matching those photos with the poet's own work. Each of the poets assembled have claimed to be inspired at some point by Walt Whitman, and these photos are exhibited in places including the Smithsonian National Portrait Gallery.

In 2017 Van Sise exhibited the first outdoor public installation to be held at the Museum of Jewish Heritage, entitled Eyewitness: Photographs. The exhibition was composed of 31 portraits of Holocaust survivors living in New York City. Each portrait was expanded to 13 feet high and five feet wide, printed on vinyl. In 2018 he exhibited his collection Sweat at the Peabody Essex Museum. Each of the photos exhibited a before and after photo of an athlete, first as they normally looked, and next just as they completed a training session. Athletes included members of the New York Knicks, New York Cosmos, the Gotham Girls Roller Derby League, and competitors in the New York City Marathon. In 2019, his exhibition A Portrait of Poetry was shown at the Center for Creative Photography and the Poetry Center at the University of Arizona.

Van Sise is also known for his practice of creating only one photograph per day. His daily photographs were the subject of a retrospective display at the Kansas City Public Library between 2019 and 2020 in the exhibition One Second.

== Books ==
Van Sise also published the poetry book Children of Grass: A Portrait of American Poetry in 2019, which received an IPPY award in 2020. The Times of London also named it one of their 2019 “books of the year”. The Booklist wrote of the work that, “Van Sise has created a singular and irresistible volume of poetry and collaborative visual lyricism that will enthrall poetry lovers and break down the hesitation of those wary of the form.”

== Awards and nominations ==
In 2025 Van Sise was appointed a Fellow of the Royal Geographical Society. Van Sise is a recipient of the New York State Council on the Arts 2026 Fiscal Sponsorship.

== Bibliography ==
- Children of Grass (Schaffner Press, 2019, ISBN 978-1-9431568-2-5)
- Invited to Life (Schiffer Publishing, 2023, ISBN 978-0-7643644-5-7)
- On the National Language (Schiffer Publishing, 2024, ISBN 978-0-7643681-4-1)
