= Colleen Plimpton =

Colleen Plimpton (born 1949) is an American garden communicator specializing in ornamental horticulture, garden memoir, and historical gardening women.

== Biography ==
Plimpton grew up in the small upstate New York farming town of Lima. Her parents were factory worker Sylvalan (Fred) (1922-2012) and schoolteacher Dorothy (1922-2007). She graduated from Lima High School and received a B.A. in Anthropology from Fordham University and a Master’s in Social Work from Columbia University. Plimpton worked as a clinical social worker for many years in numerous locales and has resided for the past 20 years in Bethel, Connecticut, where she teaches, lectures, coaches and writes about gardening.

== Work ==
Column(s):

- On Gardening, Hearst Connecticut Media Group (2009-)
- Down the Garden Path, Hearst Media Services (2012-)

Books:

- Woodstock Revisited, Chapter 21, A Day in the Country 50 stories about the famous festival by individuals who were there.
- Mentors in the Garden of Life, A garden memoir chronicling how we learn lessons about both life and horticulture while digging in the dirt with those we love.
  - →Finalist for the 2011 Connecticut Book of the Year (Memoir category)
  - →Winner of the 2010 International Book Award in the Home (Garden category)
  - →Finalist in the USA Book News “Best Books 2010” for the Home (Garden category)
  - →3rd Place in the Connecticut Press Club 2010 Awards for Nonfiction (Inspirational category)

Plimpton's articles have appeared in numerous magazines, including Toastmaster, Connecticut Gardner, and Greenprints.
