= Jeanette Pasin Sloan =

American painter

- Born: 1946 (age 79–80); Chicago
- Education: Marymount College, Tarrytown; University of Chicago
- Known for: Photorealist prints

Jeanette Pasin Sloan (born 1946) is an American visual artist known for her photorealist prints, paintings and drawings.

== Education, and early career ==
Sloan was born in Chicago in 1946, the daughter of immigrants to the United States. She received her bachelor's degree from Marymount College and her MFA from University of Chicago, in art history.

She began her art career with paintings, after she gained her MFA, and while she was a "young mom in the western suburbs" of Chicago. As a young mother in the 1970s, with two small children, she would paint in her kitchen, after putting her children to sleep for the evening. Her oeuvre took a significant turn when she noticed a reflection in a toaster that she was painting.

A catalogue raisonné of her print works was released in 2002.

== Collections ==
Sloan's work is in the collections of the Renwick Gallery of the Smithsonian Institution, the Raclin Murphy Museum of Art, the Metropolitan Museum of Art, the Cleveland Museum of Art and the Art Institute of Chicago.
