= Maureen Goodenow =

Maureen Goodenow is an American scientist and Professor of Pathology, Immunology, and Laboratory Medicine. She is best known for her work on HIV/AIDS research and advocacy.

== Biography ==
Goodenow received her B.A. in biology from Fordham University, and her Ph.D. in 1983 from the Albert Einstein College of Medicine. From 1983 to 1987, she completed postdoctoral training at Memorial Sloan-Kettering Cancer Center. From 1998 to 2016, she was a member of the faculty of the University of Florida where she held the Stephany W. Holloway University Chair in AIDS Research. In 2016, Goodenow was appointed as the Associate Director for AIDS Research and Director of the NIH Office of AIDS Research at the National Institutes of Health.

In 2012, Goodenow was awarded a Jefferson Science Fellowship, and she served in the Bureau of East Asian and Pacific Affairs at the United States Department of State. In 2015, she was appointed as the Acting Director of the Office for Research and Science within the Office of the U.S. Global AIDS Coordinator at the U.S. Department of State. There she oversaw combination prevention trials to reduce HIV/AIDS transmission funded by the U.S. President's Emergency Plan for AIDS Relief (PEPFAR).

In 2010, Goodenow was named in a lawsuit alleging misappropriation of national research funds, discrimination based upon a disability, and making disparaging remarks. The suit was dismissed when the University of Florida agreed to pay $35,000 to Christina Gavegnano.
