= Lorraine Avila =

American writer and translator

- Education: Fordham University; New York University (MA); University of Pittsburgh (MFA)
- Occupations: Writer; translator
- Website: www.lorraineavila.com

Lorraine Avila is an American writer and translator.

== Biography ==
Avila is a writer of Dominican American descent. She is from the Bronx.

She has a degree in English from Fordham University, a Master of Arts in Secondary English education from New York University, and an MFA in fiction from the University of Pittsburgh. She worked as an educator in New York City schools for several years.

She was nominated for a Pushcart Prize in 2019 for the personal essay "How to Leave Home".

Her debut young adult novel is The Making of Yolanda La Bruja (2023). She incorporated her interest in astrology and Afro-Caribbean spiritual and religious practices into the novel. It received starred reviews from Booklist, Kirkus Reviews and Publishers Weekly. A review in The Horn Book noted, "A gripping plot drives this deftly written novel that straddles the known and unknown worlds; Avila skillfully depicts the reality of growing up as a Black Latinx teen in the midst of racial violence and social upheaval". Kirkus Reviews called it "a remarkable, beautifully rendered debut". Publishers Weekly wrote, "Avila skillfully cultivates a unique and magical spin on a grounded, socially conscious plot that is rich in Afro-Latinx cultural detail". Booklist said, "Warmly characterized, particularly in its intergenerational and student-teacher relationships, Avila’s striking debut is not to be missed".

In 2020, Avila self-published Celestial Summer, an adult graphic novel, after a successful Kickstarter campaign. Yona Harvey, poet and author, said, "Celestial Summer is part mixtape, part invocation, and total sensuality trip. Skip the parallel universe and dive into these cosmic pages charting a young couple’s journey of care, protection, and trust in all its nakedness. This modern romance holds fireworks and stretch marks, shrugs and ‘shrooms. With colorful nods to Love and Rockets, New York City, and the divine feminine, the book is sexy and psychedelic, standing courageously on its own."

In 2019, Avila's Malcriada & Other Stories was published by Dominican Writer's Press. Elizabeth Acevedo, author of The Poet X, called the collection "...an UPPERCUT to the senses."

== Works ==
- Malcriada & Other Stories. Dwa Press, 2019. ISBN 9780578491196.
- Celestial Summer. 2022. ISBN 9780578757285.
- (as translator) High Spirits. Levine Querido, 2022. ISBN 9781646141296.
- The Making of Yolanda la Bruja. Levine Querido, 2023. ISBN 9781646142439.
