= Richard Guarasci =

American political scientist

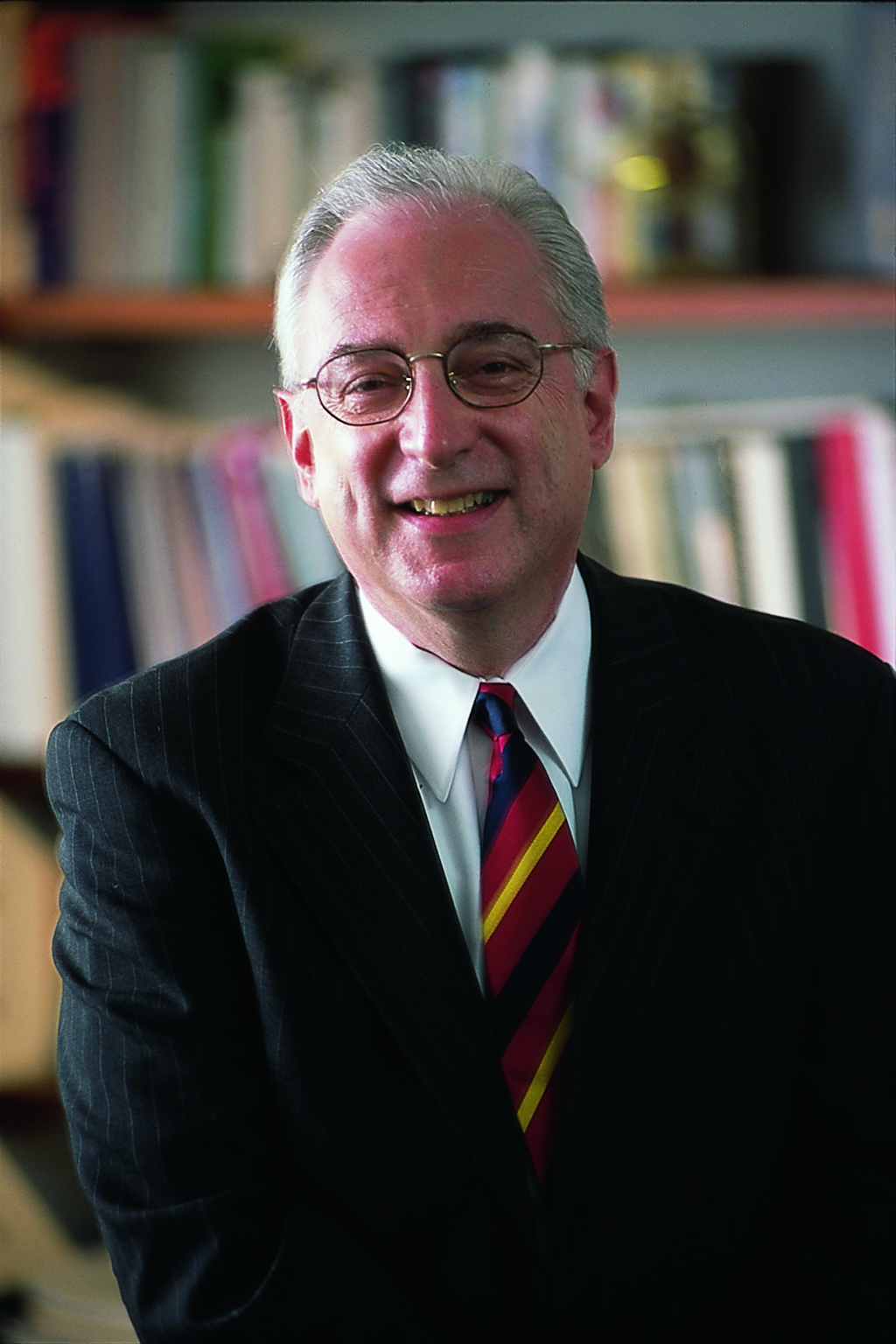

18th President of Wagner College
- In office 2002 – June 30, 2019
- Preceded by: Norman Smith
- Succeeded by: Joel W. Martin

Personal details
- Born: January 14, 1946 (age 80) Flatbush, Brooklyn, New York, U.S.
- Spouse: Carin Marie Tomasuolo Guarasci
- Children: Bridget L. Guarasci, Patrick Guarasci
- Education: Fordham University, Indiana University Bloomington
- Profession: College president, higher education leader, professor
- Website: wagner.edu

Richard Guarasci (born January 14, 1946) was the 18th president of Wagner College in Staten Island, New York. He took office on June 1, 2002 and, as of July 1, 2016, was the college's longest-serving president. He held the rank of professor of political science and taught in the areas of democracy, citizenship and American diversity. Following Guarasci's retirement on June 30, 2019, he became Wagner College's third president emeritus.

Guarasci was appointed Wagner College's provost and vice president for academic affairs in February 1997. Before coming to Wagner, he was dean of Hobart College, part of Hobart and William Smith Colleges, in Geneva, New York and, earlier, a dean and faculty member at St. Lawrence University in Canton, New York.

== Background ==
=== Education ===
Born in 1946, Richard Guarasci graduated in 1963 from Cardinal Farley Military Academy in Rhinebeck, New York. He earned his Bachelor of Science degree in economics, with a minor in philosophy, from Fordham University in the Bronx, New York, in 1967; his Master of Arts degree in economics from Indiana University Bloomington in 1969; and his Ph.D. in political science from I.U. Bloomington in 1972.

=== Personal life ===
Richard Guarasci was born and raised in the Flatbush neighborhood of Brooklyn, New York. In 1968, he married his high school sweetheart, Carin Marie Tomasuolo, who pursued a career in education, earning her doctorate from Columbia University Teachers College. They have two children. Bridget L. Guarasci, an anthropologist at Franklin & Marshall College in Lancaster, Pennsylvania, is married to attorney Mani S. Potnuru; they have a daughter, Zoe Amala Guarasci Potnuru. Patrick Guarasci, founder of the political consultancy G Strategies in Milwaukee, Wisconsin, is married to musician Hannah Gabriela “Gabby” Banuelos.

== Wagner College career ==
=== Wagner Plan for the Practical Liberal Arts ===
Richard Guarasci's first project upon becoming Wagner College's provost in 1997 was to work with faculty on a reconfiguration of the curriculum, which was called the Wagner Plan for the Practical Liberal Arts. The Wagner Plan formed the core of Wagner College's unique approach to undergraduate education until it was dismantled in 2025. The Wagner Plan had three key elements: (1) A freshman “learning community” (often abbreviated FYP, for first-year program) consisted of a pair of classes from different disciplines, taught by two professors, with a third course called a “reflective tutorial” emphasizing writing. The FYP also included a variety of “experiential learning” opportunities — sometimes field trips, sometimes community work projects. (2) An intermediate learning community (or ILC) consisted of a pair of complementary courses from different disciplines taught by a two-professor team. (3) The senior learning community (or SLC) for graduating students in each department consisted of a capstone course, a senior thesis or project, and a certain number of hours invested in either community work or an internship.

=== Port Richmond Partnership ===
In 2009, President Richard Guarasci initiated a partnership between Wagner College and a variety of businesses, schools, churches and community organizations in the Staten Island community of Port Richmond, a high-needs Black and Hispanic neighborhood about 3 miles from the college campus. The mission of the Port Richmond Partnership was to encourage sustainable relationships among members of the Port Richmond and Wagner College communities to enhance student learning and raise civic awareness, while also supporting collaborations that address significant challenges and establish measurable impacts in five high need areas: arts, education, health, economic development and immigration.

A project separate from but very closely connected to the Port Richmond Partnership is called 30,000 Degrees, indicating the additional number of 4-year college degrees the project hopes to generate among Staten Island residents over a 10-year period. The project, spearheaded in 2015 by Richard Guarasci, was a partnership between Wagner College and the other two institutions of higher learning on Staten Island, St. John's University and the College of Staten Island, a City University of New York affiliate. 30,000 Degrees focuses upon college readiness programs embedded in Staten Island public schools, beginning with high schools and extending later to intermediate and elementary schools. One of these college-readiness programs was the Port Richmond Partnership Leadership Academy. As part of the PRPLA program, cohorts lived and studied on the Wagner College campus each summer, and competitive scholarships were available to participants.

=== Building the endowment and the campus ===
When Richard Guarasci first joined the Wagner College community, in 1997, the college's endowment was valued at $4 million. In January 2018, when Guarasci announced his plan to retire the following year, the endowment's value stood at $98.7 million.

During Guarasci's tenure as president, one new building was dedicated, and another was given a major refurbishment. Foundation Hall, the first new residence facility opened on the Wagner College campus since Harbor View Hall in 1969, welcomed its first residents in January 2010. Built at a cost of $24 million, it accommodates 200 students. And in October 2012, the college re-opened Main Hall after an 18-month, $15 million external restoration project. The collegiate gothic building, dedicated in 1930, is considered the architectural signature of the college.

=== Longest-serving Wagner College president ===
At its October 2016 meeting, Wagner College's Board of Trustees recognized Richard Guarasci for his superior record of longevity as the institution's president. On July 1 of that year, Guarasci had become the longest-serving president in the college's history, having surpassed the previous record held by President Arthur Ole Davidson (14 standard 365-day years, 31 days, and 3 “leap days”). Davidson retired in 1975.

== Leadership in higher education ==
Chairman, Association of American Colleges and Universities board of directors

Chairman and secretary of the board, Campus Compact

President emeritus, Coalition of Urban and Metropolitan Universities

Former chairman, New American Colleges & Universities

Former chairman, New York State Higher Education Services Corporation

In 2012, Richard Guarasci was one of 11 members of the National Task Force on Civic Learning and Democratic Engagement that produced a report, “A Crucible Moment: College Learning & Democracy’s Future,” published by the Association of American Colleges and Universities.

== Select publications ==
=== Books ===
“Democratic Education in the Age of Difference: Redefining Citizenship in Higher Education,” co-authored with Grant H. Cornwell and others (San Francisco: Jossey-Bass, 1997)

"Neighborhood Democracy: Building Anchor Partnerships Between Colleges & Their Communities" (Sterling, VA: Stylus Pub, 2022)

=== Book chapter ===
“Renewing the Civic Purpose of Liberal Education,” co-authored with Barry N. Checkoway and Peter L. Levine, in the book, “Transforming Undergraduate Education: Theory that Compels and Practices that Succeed,” edited by Donald W. Harward (Lanham, Md.: Rowman & Littlefield, 2011)

=== Articles ===
“Developing the Democratic Arts,” in About Campus magazine (Feb. 2001), published by ACPA—College Student Educators International and Jossey-Bass

“On the Challenge of Becoming the Good College,” in Liberal Education magazine (Winter 2006, Vol. 92 No. 1), published by the Association of American Colleges and Universities

“Sustaining Transformation, Resiliency in Hard Times,” co-authored with Wagner College Provost Devorah Lieberman, in Change: The Magazine of Higher Education (Nov.-Dec. 2009), published by the Carnegie Foundation for the Advancement of Teaching

“Anchoring Democracy: The Civic Imperative for Higher Education,” in Liberal Education magazine (Winter 2018, Vol. 104 No. 1) ), published by the Association of American Colleges and Universities
