= History of CBS =

History of the commercial TV and radio network

CBS was founded as a radio network in 1927 and then expanded to television in the 1940s. Although it primarily remained an independent, publicly traded company (NYSE: CBS) throughout most of the 20th century, Paramount Pictures temporarily held a 49% ownership stake from 1929 to 1932. However, in 1995 the Westinghouse Electric Corporation acquired the company, becoming CBS Corporation (after selling certain assets). In 2000, CBS sold again to the original incarnation of Viacom (formed as a spin-off of CBS in 1971, which acquired Paramount Pictures in 1994). In 2005, Viacom split itself into two separate companies and re-established CBS Corporation. However, National Amusements controlled both CBS and the second incarnation of Viacom until 2019, when both companies agreed to re-merge to become ViacomCBS. In 2022, ViacomCBS changed its name to Paramount Global after Paramount Pictures. In 2025, Paramount Global, National Amusements and Skydance Media merged to form Paramount Skydance Corporation. In 2026, Paramount Skydance merged with Warner Bros. Discovery to form Skydance.

== Early radio years ==
The origins of CBS date back to January 27, 1927, with the creation of the United Independent Broadcasters network in Chicago by New York City talent agent Arthur Judson. The fledgling network soon needed additional investors, and the Columbia Phonograph Company, manufacturers of Columbia Records, rescued it in April 1927. Now the Columbia Phonographic Broadcasting System, the network went to air under its new name on September 18, 1927, with a presentation by the Howard L. Barlow Orchestra from flagship station WOR in Newark, and fifteen affiliates.

Operational costs were steep, particularly the payments to AT&T for use of its landlines, and by the end of 1927, Columbia Phonograph wanted out. In early 1928 Judson sold the network to brothers Isaac and Leon Levy, owners of the network's Philadelphia affiliate WCAU, and their partner Jerome Louchheim. None of the three were interested in assuming day-to-day management of the network, so they installed wealthy 26-year-old William S. Paley, son of a Philadelphia cigar family and in-law of the Levys, as president. With the record company out of the picture, Paley quickly streamlined the corporate name to "Columbia Broadcasting System". He believed in the power of radio advertising since his family's La Palina cigars had doubled their sales after young William convinced his elders to advertise on radio. By September 1928, Paley bought out the Louchheim share of CBS and became its majority owner with 51% of the business.

=== Turnaround: Paley's first year ===
During Louchheim's brief regime, Columbia paid $410,000 to Alfred H. Grebe's Atlantic Broadcasting Corporation (ABC) for the small Brooklyn station WABC (no relation to the current WABC), which would become the network's flagship station. WABC was quickly upgraded, and the signal relocated to 860 kHz. The physical plant was also relocated to Steinway Hall on West 57th Street in Manhattan, where much of CBS's programming would originate. By the turn of 1929, the network had 47 affiliates.

Paley moved right away to put his network on a firmer financial footing. In the fall of 1928, he entered into talks with Adolph Zukor of Paramount Pictures, who planned to move into radio in response to RCA's forays into motion pictures with the advent of talkies. The deal came to fruition in September 1929; Paramount acquired 49% of CBS in return for a block of its stock worth $3.8 million at the time. The agreement specified that Paramount would buy that same stock back for a flat $5 million by March 1, 1932, provided that CBS had earned $2 million during 1931 and 1932. For a brief time, there was talk that the network might be renamed "Paramount Radio", but it only lasted a month as the 1929 stock market crash sent all stock value tumbling. It galvanized Paley and his troops, who had no alternative but to "turn the network around and earn the $2,000,000 in two years... This is the atmosphere in which the CBS of today was born." The near-bankrupt film studio sold its CBS shares back to the network in 1932. In the first year of Paley's watch, CBS's gross earnings more than tripled, going from $1.4 million to $4.7 million.

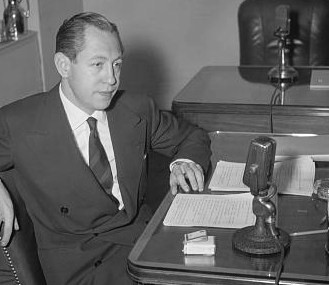
Paley's management saw a twentyfold increase in gross income in his first decade.

Much of the increase was a result of Paley's effort to improve affiliate relations. There were two types of program at the time: sponsored and sustaining, i.e., unsponsored. Rival network NBC paid affiliates for every sponsored show they carried, and charged them for every sustaining show they ran. It was onerous for small and medium stations, and resulted in both unhappy affiliates and limited carriage of sustaining programs. Paley had a different idea, designed to get CBS programs emanating from as many radio sets as possible: he would give the sustaining programs away for free, provided the station would run every sponsored show, and accept CBS's check for doing so. CBS soon had more affiliates than either NBC Red or NBC Blue.

Paley valued style and taste, and in 1929, once he had his affiliates happy and his company's creditworthiness on the mend, he relocated his company to the sleek, new 485 Madison Avenue, the "heart of the advertising community, right where Paley wanted his company to be", and where it would stay until its move to its own Eero Saarinen-designed headquarters, the CBS Building, in 1965. When his new landlords expressed skepticism about the network and its fly-by-night reputation, Paley overcame their qualms by inking a lease for $1.5 million.

=== CBS takes on the Red and the Blue (1930s) ===
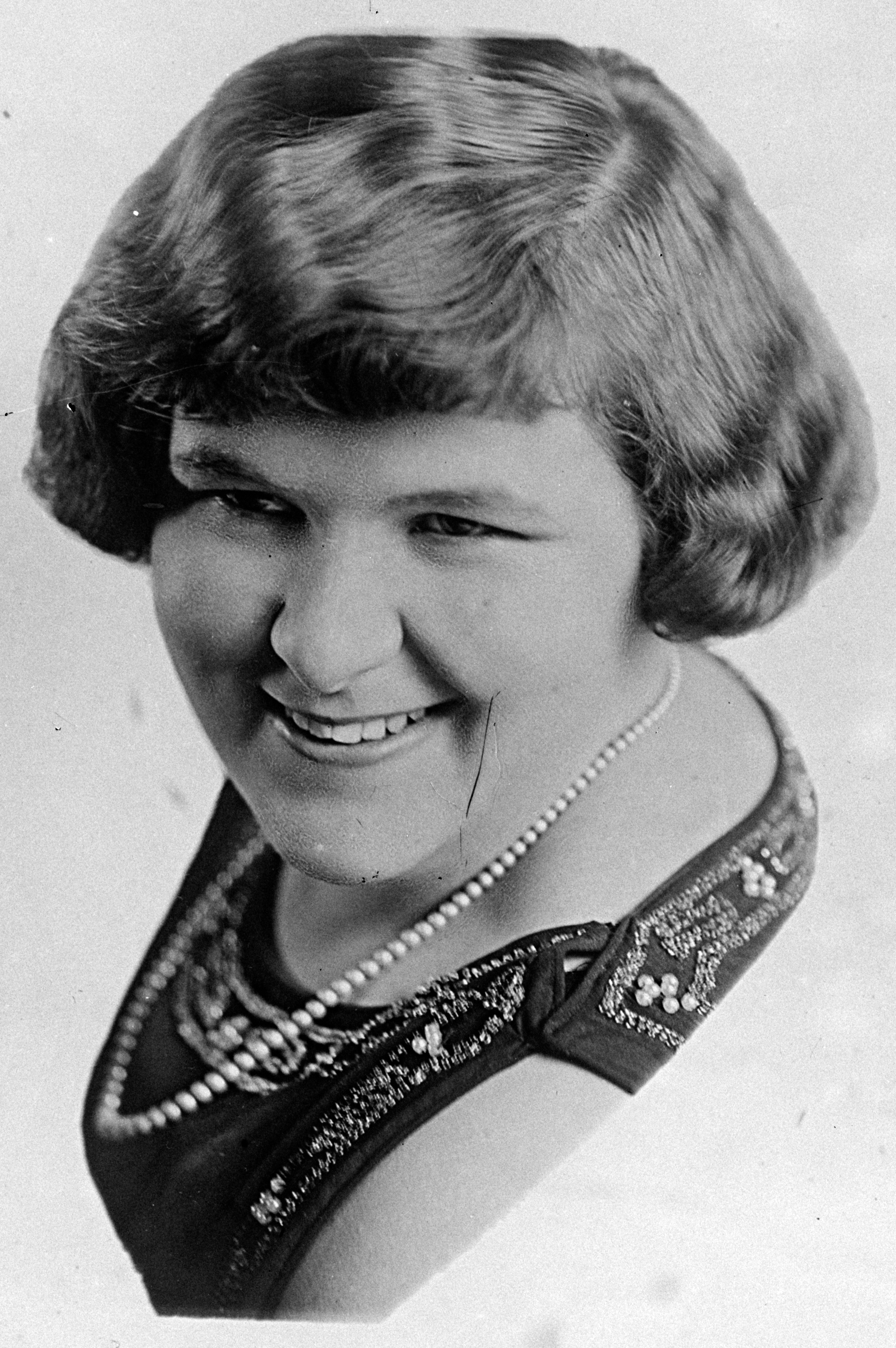
Wholesome Kate Smith, Paley's choice for La Palina Hour, was unthreatening to home and hearth.

Since NBC was the broadcast arm of the Radio Corporation of America (RCA), its chief David Sarnoff approached his decisions as both a broadcaster and as a hardware executive; NBC's affiliates all had the latest RCA broadcasting equipment, and were often the best-established stations, or were on "clear channel" frequencies. Yet Sarnoff's affiliates were mistrustful of him. Paley had no such split loyalties: his and his affiliates' success rose and fell with the quality of CBS programming.

Paley had an innate sense of entertainment. David Halberstam wrote that he had "a gift of the gods, an ear totally pure", and knew "what was good and would sell, what was bad and would sell, and what was good and would not sell, and he never confused one with another." As the 1930s loomed closer, Paley set about building the CBS talent stable. The network became the home to many popular musical and comedy stars, among them Jack Benny ("Your Canada Dry Humorist"), Al Jolson, George Burns and Gracie Allen, and Kate Smith, whom Paley had personally selected for his family's La Palina Hour as she was not the type of woman to provoke jealousy in American wives. When Paley heard a phonograph record of Bing Crosby, then a young unknown crooner, on a mid-ocean voyage, he rushed to the ship's radio room and cabled New York to sign Crosby immediately to a contract for a daily radio show.

While the CBS primetime lineup featured music, comedy and variety shows, the daytime schedule was a direct conduit into American homes – and into the hearts and minds of American women. For many, it was the bulk of their adult human contact during the course of the day. CBS salesmen recognized early on that this intimate connection could be a bonanza for advertisers of female-interest products. Starting in 1930, astrologer Evangeline Adams would consult the heavens on behalf of listeners who sent in their birthdays, a description of their problems, and a boxtop from sponsor Forhan's toothpaste. The low-key murmuring of smooth-voiced Tony Wons, backed by a tender violin, "made him a soul mate to millions of women" on behalf of the R. J. Reynolds tobacco company, whose cellophane-wrapped Camel cigarettes were "as fresh as the dew that dawn spills on a field of clover". The most popular radio-friend of all was M. Sayle Taylor, the Voice of Experience, though his name was never uttered on air. Women mailed descriptions of the most intimate of relationship problems to the Voice in the tens of thousands per week; sponsors Musterole ointment and Haley's M–O laxative enjoyed sales increases of several hundred percent in just the first month of The Voice of Experience's run.

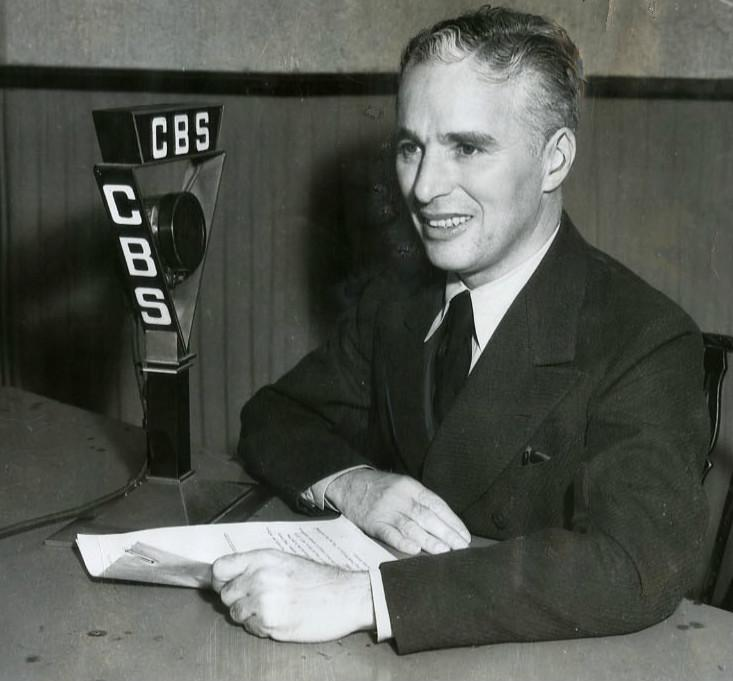
Silent movie star Charlie Chaplin using his voice on CBS

As the decade progressed, a new genre joined the daytime lineup: serial drama soap operas, so named for the products that sponsored them. These were usually in quarter-hour episodes and proliferated widely in the mid- and late 1930s. They all had the same basic premise, namely that characters "fell into two categories: 1) those in trouble and 2) those who helped people in trouble. The helping-hand figures were usually older." At CBS, Just Plain Bill brought human insight and Anacin pain reliever into households; Your Family and Mine came courtesy of Sealtest Dairy products; Bachelor's Children first hawked Old Dutch Cleanser, then Wonder Bread; Aunt Jenny's Real Life Stories was sponsored by Spry Vegetable Shortening. Our Gal Sunday (Anacin again), The Romance of Helen Trent (Angélus cosmetics), Big Sister (Rinso laundry soap), and many others filled the daytime ether.

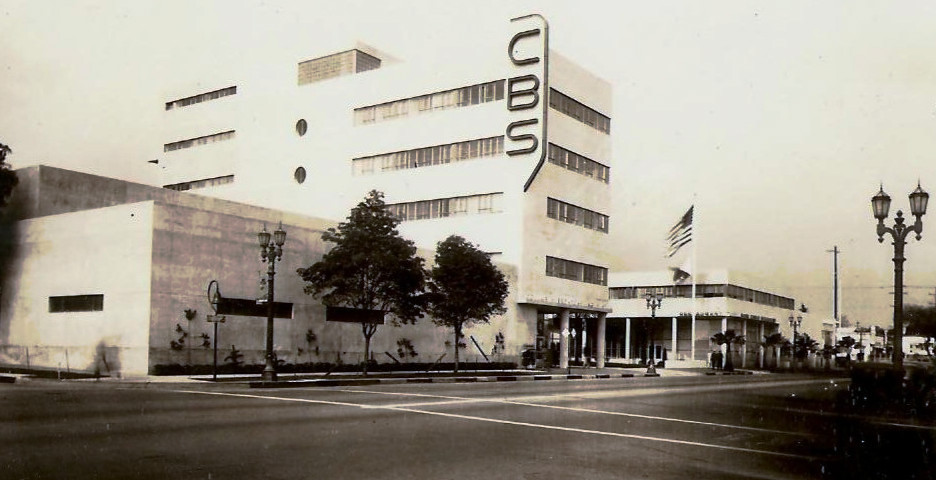
The CBS West Coast headquarters in Columbia Square reflected its industry stature while hosting its top Hollywood talent.

Thanks to its daytime and primetime schedules, CBS prospered in the 1930s. In 1935, gross sales were $19.3 million, yielding a profit of $2.27 million. By 1937, the network took in $28.7 million and had 114 affiliates, almost all of which cleared 100% of network-fed programming, thus keeping ratings, and revenue, high. In 1938, CBS acquired the American Record Corporation, parent of its one-time investor Columbia Records. In 1938, NBC and CBS each opened broadcast studios on Sunset Boulevard in Hollywood in order to attract the entertainment industry's top talent to their networks.

=== CBS launches an independent news division ===
The extraordinary potential of radio news showed itself in 1930, when CBS suddenly found itself with a live telephone connection to a prisoner called "the Deacon", who described, from the inside and in real time, a riot and conflagration at the Ohio Penitentiary; for CBS, it was "a shocking journalistic coup". Yet as late as 1934, there was still no regularly scheduled newscast on network radio; "most sponsors did not want network news programming; those that did were inclined to expect veto rights over it." There had been a longstanding wariness between radio and the newspapers as well; the papers had rightly concluded that the upstart radio business would compete with them in both advertising dollars and news coverage. By 1933, the newspapers began fighting back, many no longer publishing radio schedules for readers' convenience, or allowing their own news to be read on the air for radio's profit. Radio, in turn, pushed back when urban department stores, newspapers' largest advertisers and themselves owners of many radio stations, threatened to withhold their ads from print. A short-lived truce in 1933 even saw the papers proposing that radio be forbidden from running news before 9:30 a.m., and then only after 9:00 p.m., and that no news story could air until it was 12 hours old.

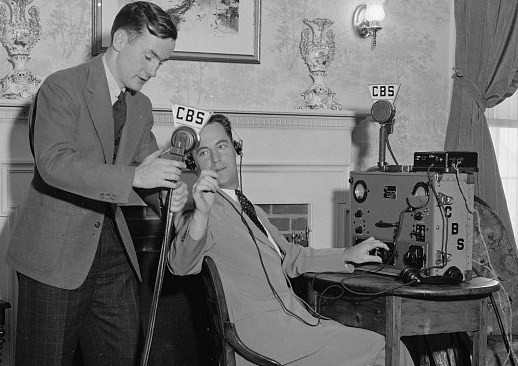
CBS News engineers prepare a remote: Justice Hugo Black's 1937 denial of Ku Klux Klan ties.

It was in this climate that Paley set out to "enhance the prestige of CBS, to make it seem in the public mind the more advanced, dignified and socially aware network". He did it by sustaining programming of the New York Philharmonic, Norman Corwin's drama, and an in-house news division to gather and present news, free of fickle suppliers such as the newspapers or wire services. In the fall of 1934, CBS launched an independent news division, shaped in its first years by Paley's vice-president, former New York Times columnist Ed Klauber, and news director Paul White. Since there was no blueprint or precedent for real-time news coverage, early efforts of the new division used the shortwave link-up CBS had been using for five years to bring live feeds of European events to its American air.

A key early hire was Edward R. Murrow in 1935; his first corporate title was Director of Talks. He was mentored in microphone technique by Robert Trout, the lone full-time member of the News Division, and quickly found himself in a growing rivalry with his boss White. Murrow was glad to "leave the hothouse atmosphere of the New York office behind" when he was dispatched to London as CBS's European Director in 1937, when the growing Hitler menace underscored the need for a robust European Bureau. Halberstam described Murrow in London as "the right man in the right place in the right era". Murrow began assembling the staff of broadcast journalists who would become known as the "Murrow Boys", including such men as William L. Shirer, Charles Collingwood, Bill Downs, and Eric Sevareid. They were "in [Murrow's] own image, sartorially impeccable, literate, often liberal, and prima donnas all". They covered history in the making, and sometimes made it themselves. On March 12, 1938, Hitler boldly annexed nearby Austria, and Murrow and the Boys quickly assembled coverage with Shirer in London, Edgar Ansel Mowrer in Paris, Pierre Huss in Berlin, Frank Gervasi in Rome, and Trout in New York. This bore the now-ubiquitous News Round-Up format.

Murrow's nightly reports from the rooftops during the dark days of the London Blitz galvanized American listeners. Even before Pearl Harbor, the conflict became "the story of the survival of Western civilization, the most heroic of all possible wars and stories. He was indeed reporting on the survival of the English-speaking peoples." With his "manly, tormented voice", Murrow contained and mastered the panic and danger he felt, thereby communicating it all the more effectively to his audience. Using his trademark self-reference "this reporter", he did not so much report news as interpret it, combining simplicity of expression with subtlety of nuance. Murrow himself said he tried to "describe things in terms that make sense to the truck driver without insulting the intelligence of the professor". When he returned home for a visit late in 1941, Paley threw an "extraordinarily elaborate reception" for Murrow at the Waldorf-Astoria. This reception also served as an announcement to the world that Paley's network was finally more than just a pipeline carrying other people's programming and had now become a cultural force in its own right.

When Murrow returned for good after the war, he was labeled "a superstar with prestige and freedom and respect within his profession and his company". He owned enormous capital within that company, and as the unknown format of television news loomed large, he would spend it freely, first in radio news, then in television, first taking on Senator Joseph McCarthy, then eventually – and unsuccessfully – William S. Paley himself.

=== Panic: The War of the Worlds radio broadcast ===
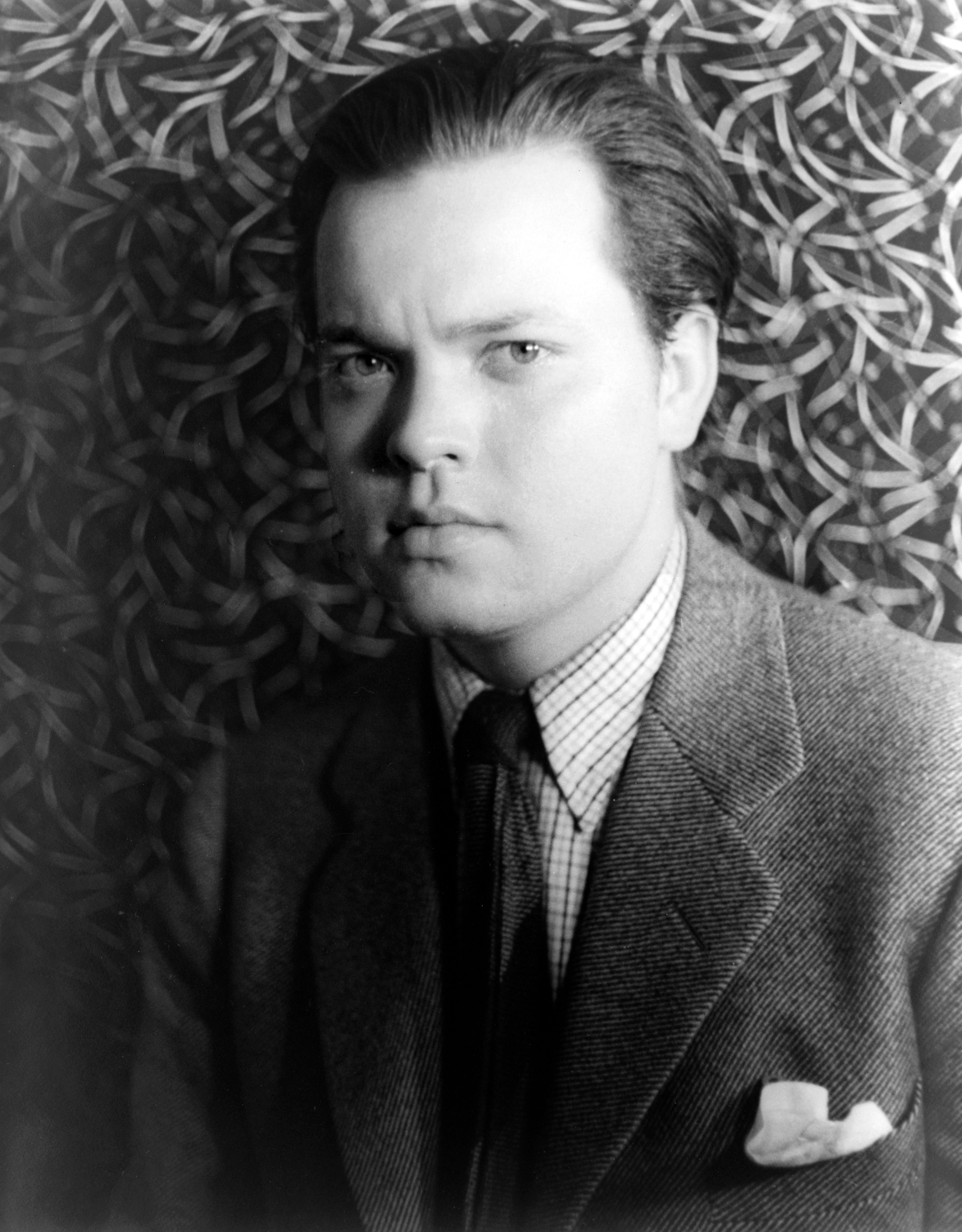
Enfant terrible Orson Welles's "Halloween joke" spooked the country and snared a sponsor.

On October 30, 1938, CBS Radio gained a taste of infamy when The Mercury Theatre on the Air broadcast a radio adaptation of H. G. Wells' The War of the Worlds, performed and directed by 23-year-old Orson Welles. Its unique format, a contemporary version of the story in the form of faux news broadcasts, allegedly told listeners that invaders from Mars were actually invading and devastating Grover's Mill, New Jersey, despite three disclaimers during the broadcast stating that it was a work of fiction. The flood of publicity after the broadcast had two effects: a 1992 FCC law banning faux news bulletins within dramatic programming, and sponsorship for The Mercury Theatre on the Air, becoming The Campbell Playhouse to sell soup. Welles, for his part, summarized the episode as "the Mercury Theatre's own radio version of dressing up in a sheet and jumping out of a bush and saying Boo!"

==== CBS recruits Edmund A. Chester ====
Before the United States joined World War II, in 1940, CBS recruited Edmund A. Chester from his position as Bureau Chief for Latin America at the Associated Press to serve as Director of Latin American Relations and Director of Short Wave Broadcasts for the CBS radio network. In this capacity, Chester coordinated the development of the Network of the Americas (La Cadena de las Americas) with the Department of State, the Office for Inter-American Affairs (chaired by Nelson Rockefeller), and the Voice of America as part of President Roosevelt's support for Pan-Americanism during World War II. This network provided vital news and cultural programming throughout South America and Central America during the crucial World War II era, and fostered diplomatic relations between the United States and the other nations. It featured such popular radio broadcasts as Viva América, which showcased leading musical talent from both North and South America, including John Serry Sr., as accompanied by the CBS Pan American Orchestra under the musical direction of Alfredo Antonini. The post-war era also marked the beginning of CBS's dominance in the field of radio.

==== Zenith of network radio (1940s) ====
As 1939 wound down, Paley announced that 1940 would be "the greatest year in the history of radio in the United States". Indeed, the 1940s would turn out to be the apogee of network radio by every metric. Nearly 100% of the advertisers who made sponsorship deals in 1939 renewed their contracts for 1940; manufacturers of farm tractors made radios standard equipment on their machines; wartime rationing of paper limited the size of newspapers and thus print advertisements, causing a shift toward radio sponsorship. A 1942 act by Congress made advertising expenses a tax benefit, which sent even automobile and tire manufacturers – who had no products to sell since they had been converted to war production – scurrying to sponsor symphony orchestras and serious drama on radio. In 1940, only one-third of radio programs were sponsored, while two-thirds were sustaining; by the middle of the decade, the statistics had swapped. One of the more prominent sustaining shows on the network was Wings Over Jordan, a half-hour program on Sunday mornings showcasing an African-American a cappella spiritual choir of the same name. Originating from Cleveland affiliate WGAR, it was directly cited by the National Association of Broadcasters when they bestowed both the station and network with inaugural George Foster Peabody Awards in 1941.

CBS in the 1940s was vastly different from that of its early days; many of the old guard veterans had died, retired, or simply left the network. No change was greater than that in Paley himself, who had become difficult to work for, and had "gradually shifted from leader to despot". He spent much of his time seeking social connections and in cultural pursuits; his hope was that CBS "could somehow learn to run itself". His brief to an interior designer remodeling his townhouse included a requirement for closets that would accommodate 300 suits and 100 shirts, and had special racks for 100 neckties.

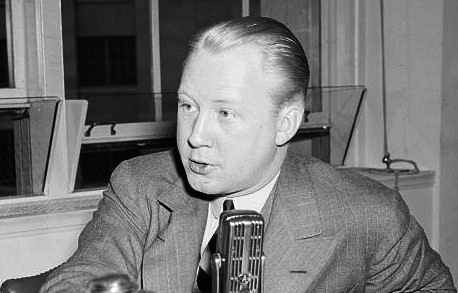
Dr. Frank Stanton, second only to Paley in his impact on CBS, president 1946–1971

As Paley grew more remote, he installed a series of buffer executives who sequentially assumed more and more power at CBS: first Ed Klauber, then Paul Kesten, and finally Frank Stanton. Second only to Paley as the author of CBS's style and ambitions in its first half-century, Stanton was "a magnificent mandarin who functioned as company superintendent, spokesman, and image-maker". He had come to the network in 1933 after sending copies of his Ph.D. thesis "A Critique Of Present Methods and a New Plan for Studying Radio Listening Behavior" to CBS top brass, and they responded with a job offer. He scored an early hit with his study "Memory for Advertising Copy Presented Visually vs. Orally", which CBS salesmen used to great effect, bringing in new sponsors. In 1946, Paley appointed Stanton as President of CBS and promoted himself to chairman. Stanton's colorful but impeccable wardrobe – slate-blue pinstripe suit, ecru shirt, robin's egg blue necktie with splashes of saffron – made him, in the mind of one sardonic CBS vice president, "the greatest argument we have for color television".

Despite the influx of advertisers and their money – or perhaps because of them – the 1940s were not without bumps for the radio networks. The biggest challenge came in the form of the FCC's chain broadcasting investigation, often called the "monopoly probe". Though it started in 1938, the investigation only gathered steam in 1940 under new-broom chairman James L. Fly. By the time the smoke had cleared in 1943, NBC had already spun off its Blue Network, which became the American Broadcasting Company (ABC). CBS was also hit, though not as severely: Paley's 1928 affiliate contract, which had given CBS first claim on local stations' air during sponsored time – the network option – came under attack as being restrictive to local programming. The final compromise permitted the network option for three out of four hours during the daytime, but the new regulations had virtually no practical effect, since most all stations accepted the network feed, especially the sponsored hours that earned them money. Fly's panel also forbade networks from owning artists' representation bureaus, so CBS sold its bureau to Music Corporation of America, and it became Management Corporation of America.

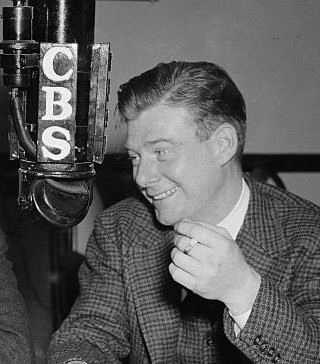
Arthur Godfrey spoke directly to listeners, making him the foremost pitchman in his era.

On the air, the war affected almost every show. Variety shows wove patriotism through their comedy and music segments; dramas and soaps had characters join the service and go off to fight. Even before hostilities commenced in Europe, one of the most played songs on radio was Irving Berlin's "God Bless America", popularized by CBS personality Kate Smith. Although an Office of Censorship sprang up within days of Pearl Harbor, censorship would be totally voluntary. A few shows submitted scripts for review, but most did not. The guidelines that the Office did issue banned weather reports (including announcement of sports rainouts), as well as news about war production or troop, ship, or plane movements, and live man-on-the-street interviews. The ban on ad-libbing caused quizzes, game shows, and amateur hours to wither for the duration.

Surprising was the "granite permanence" of the shows at the top of the ratings. The vaudevillians and musicians who were hugely popular after the war were the same stars who had been huge in the 1930s; Jack Benny, Bing Crosby, Burns and Allen, and Edgar Bergen all had been on the radio almost as long as there had been network radio. A notable exception to this was relative newcomer Arthur Godfrey, who was still doing a local morning show in Washington, D.C. as late as 1942. Godfrey, who had been a cemetery lot salesman and a cab driver, pioneered the style of talking directly to the listener as an individual, with a singular "you" rather than phrases like "Now, folks..." or "Yes, friends...". His combined shows contributed as much as 12% of all CBS revenues; by 1948, he was making $500,000 a year.

In 1947, Paley, still the undisputed "head talent scout" of CBS, led a much-publicized "talent raid" on NBC. One day, while Freeman Gosden and Charles Correll were hard at work at NBC writing their venerable Amos and Andy series, Paley came to the door with an astonishing offer: "Whatever you are getting now I will give you twice as much." Capturing NBC's cornerstone show was enough of a coup, but Paley repeated in 1948 with longtime NBC stars Edgar Bergen, Charlie McCarthy, and Red Skelton, as well as former CBS defectors Jack Benny, who was radio's top-rated comedian, and Burns and Allen. Paley achieved this rout with a legal agreement reminiscent of his 1928 contract that caused some NBC radio affiliates to jump ship and join CBS. CBS would buy the stars' names as a property in exchange for a large lump sum and salary. The plan relied on the vastly different tax rates between income and capital gains, so not only would the stars enjoy more than twice their income after taxes, but CBS would preclude any NBC counterattack because CBS owned the performers' names.

As a result of this, CBS finally beat NBC in the ratings in 1949, but it was not just to one-up rival Sarnoff that Paley led his talent raid; he and all of radio had their eye on the coming force that threw a shadow over radio throughout the 1940s – television.

=== Primetime radio gives way to television (1950s) ===
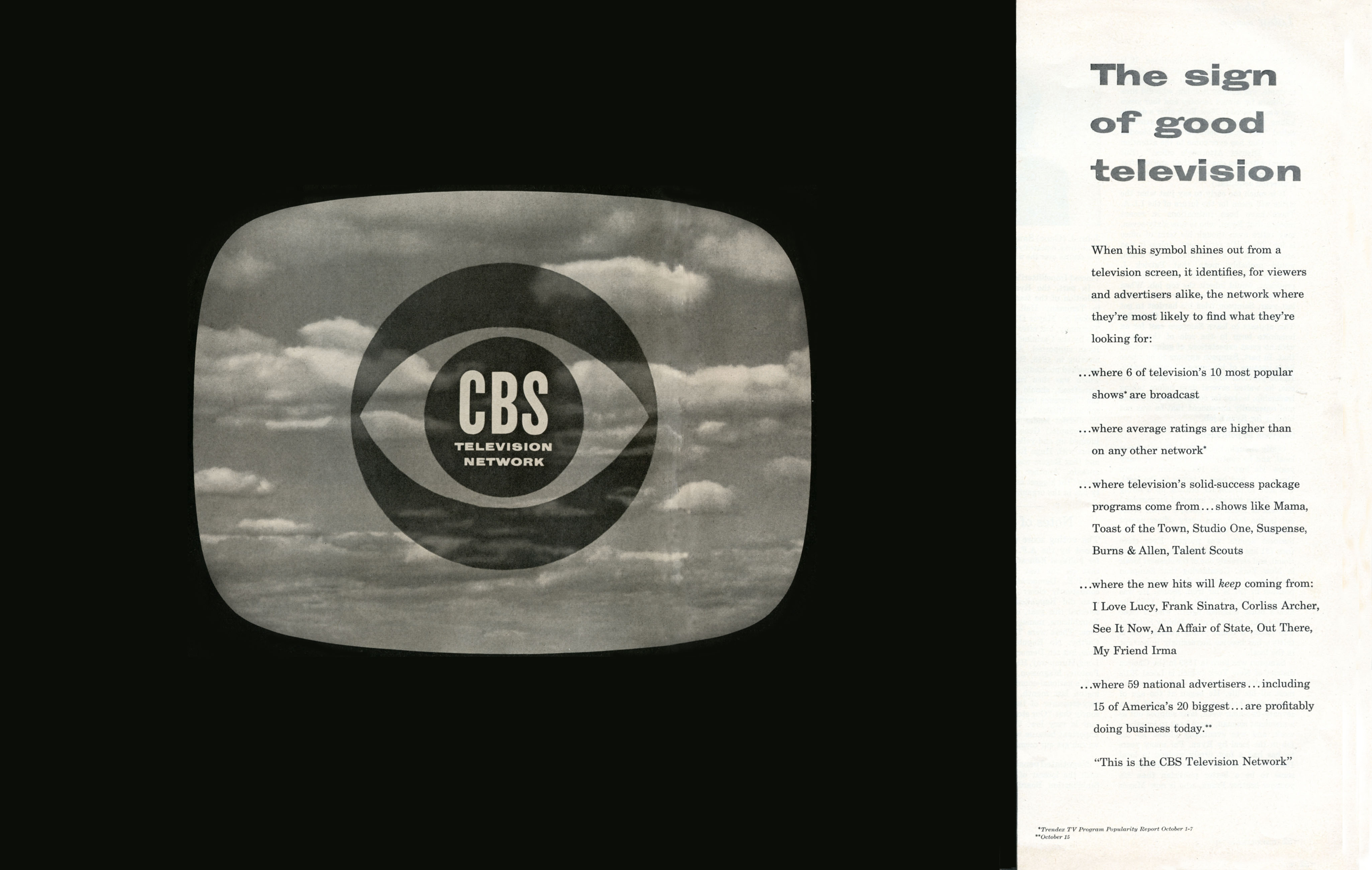
A 1951 advertisement for the CBS Television Network introduced the Eye logo.

In the spring of 1940, CBS staff engineer Peter Goldmark devised a system for color television that CBS management hoped would leapfrog the network over NBC and its existing black-and-white RCA system. The CBS system "gave brilliant and stable colors", while NBC's was "crude and unstable but 'compatible'". Ultimately, the FCC rejected the CBS system because it was incompatible with RCA's, along with the fact that CBS had moved to secure many ultra high frequency (UHF), not very high frequency (VHF), television licenses, leaving them flatfooted in the early television age. In 1946, only 6,000 television sets were in operation, most in greater New York City where there were already three stations; by 1949, the number had increased to 3 million sets, and by 1951, had risen to 12 million. There were 64 American cities with television stations, though most of them only had one.

Radio continued to be the backbone of the company in the early 1950s, but it was "a strange, twilight period" where some cities had often multiple television stations which siphoned the audience from radio, while other cities such as Denver and Portland had no television stations at all. In those areas, as well as rural areas and some entire states, network radio remained the sole nationally broadcast service. NBC's venerable Fred Allen saw his ratings plummet when he was pitted against upstart ABC's game show Stop The Music!; within weeks, he was dropped by longtime sponsor Ford Motor Company and was shortly gone from the scene. Radio powerhouse Bob Hope's ratings plunged from a 23.8 share in 1949 to 5.4 in 1953. By 1952, "death seemed imminent for network radio" in its familiar form; most tellingly, the big sponsors were eager for the switch.

Gradually, as the television network took shape, radio stars began to migrate to the new medium. Many programs ran on both media while making the transition. The radio soap opera The Guiding Light moved to television in 1952, where it would run for another 57 years; Burns & Allen, back "home" from NBC, made the move in 1950; Lucille Ball a year later; Our Miss Brooks in 1952 (though it continued simultaneously on radio for its full television life). The high-rated Jack Benny Program ended its radio run in 1955, and Edgar Bergen's Sunday night show went off the air a year later. In 1956, CBS announced that its radio operations had lost money, while the television network had made money. When the soap opera Ma Perkins went off the air on November 25, 1960, only eight series remained, all relatively minor. Primetime radio ended on September 30, 1962, when Yours Truly, Johnny Dollar and Suspense aired for the final time.

=== CBS's radio programming after 1972 ===
The retirement of Arthur Godfrey in April 1972 marked the end of long-form programming on CBS radio; programming thereafter consisted of hourly news summaries and news features, known in the 1970s as Dimension, and commentaries, including the Spectrum series that evolved into the "Point/Counterpoint" feature on the television network's 60 Minutes and First Line Report, a news and analysis feature delivered by CBS correspondents. The network also continued to offer traditional radio programming through its nightly CBS Radio Mystery Theater during week. This was the lone holdout of dramatic programming, which ran from 1974 to 1982, though shorter runs were given to the General Mills Radio Adventure Theater, The Zero Hour and the Sears/Mutual Radio Theater in the 1970s – early 1980s; otherwise, most new dramatic radio was carried on public and to some extent religious stations. The CBS Radio Network continued until 2026, offering hourly newscasts, including its centerpiece CBS World News Roundup in the morning and evening and its weekend sister program CBS News Weekend Roundup, and various other segments such tip segments from various other sources.

On November 17, 2017, CBS Radio was sold to Entercom, becoming the last of the original Big Four radio networks to be owned by its founding company. Although the CBS parent itself ceased to exist when it was acquired by Westinghouse Electric in 1995, CBS Radio continued to be run by CBS until its sale to Entercom. Prior to its acquisition, ABC Radio was sold to Citadel Broadcasting in 2007 (and is now a part of Cumulus Media), while Mutual (now defunct) and NBC Radio were acquired by Westwood One in the 1980s. Westwood One and CBS were under common ownership from 1993 to 2007; the former would be acquired outright by Dial Global in October 2011.

== Television years: Expansion and growth ==
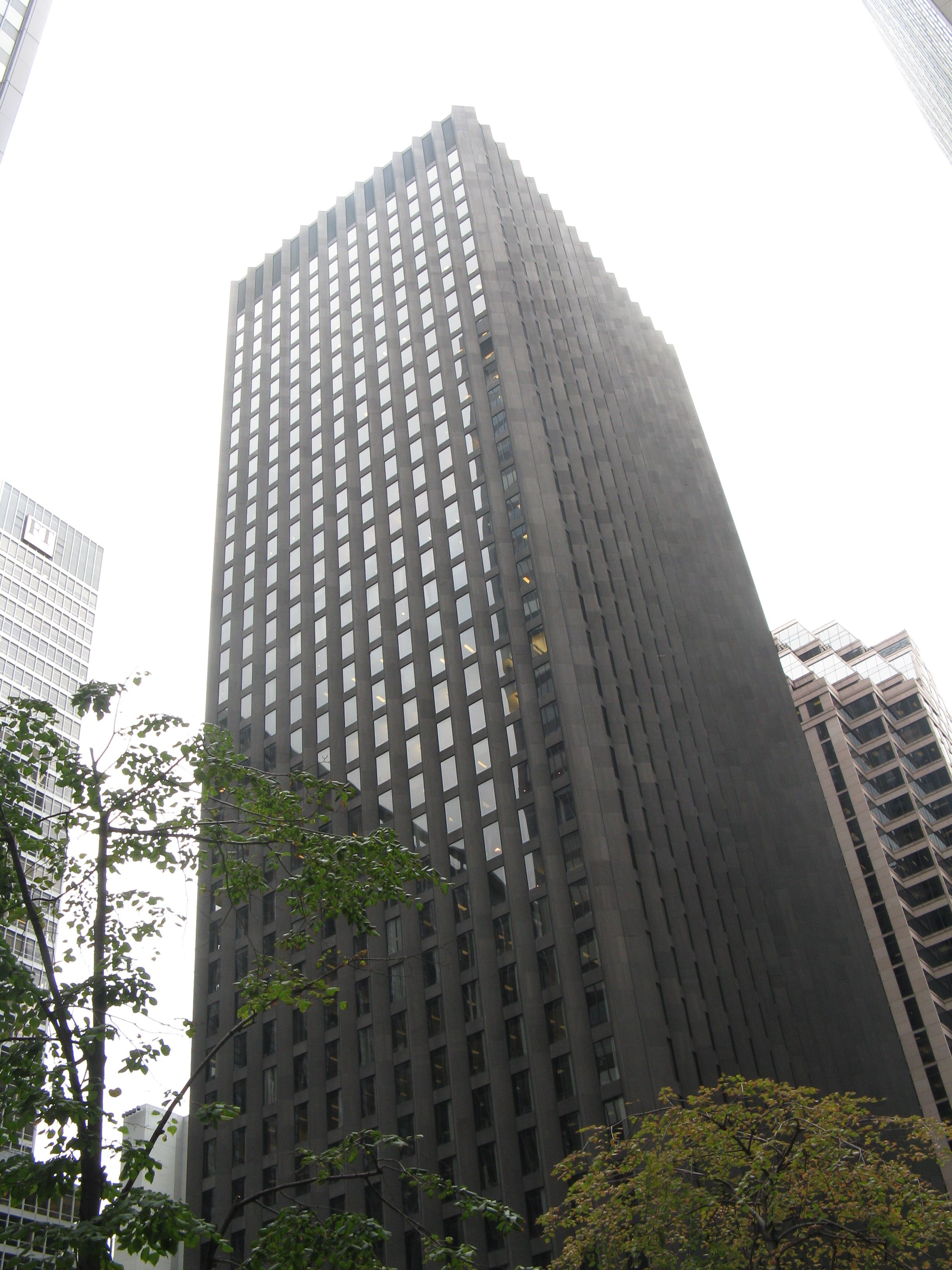
CBS Headquarters in New York City

CBS's involvement in television dates back to the opening of experimental station W2XAB in New York City on July 21, 1931, using the mechanical television system that had more or less been perfected in the late 1920s. Its initial broadcast featured New York mayor Jimmy Walker, Kate Smith, and George Gershwin. The station boasted the first regular seven-day broadcasting schedule in American television, broadcasting 28 hours a week.

Announcer-director Bill Schudt was the station's only paid employee; all other talent was volunteer. W2XAB pioneered program development including small-scale dramatic acts, monologues, pantomime, and the use of projection slides to simulate sets. Engineer Bill Lodge devised the first synchronized sound wave for a television station in 1932, enabling W2XAB to broadcast picture and sound on a single shortwave channel instead of the two previously needed. On November 8, 1932, W2XAB broadcast the first television coverage of presidential election returns. The station suspended operations on February 20, 1933, as monochrome television transmission standards were in flux, and in the process of changing from a mechanical to an all-electronic system. W2XAB returned to the air with an all-electronic system in 1939 from a new studio complex in Grand Central Station and a transmitter atop the Chrysler Building, broadcasting on channel 2. W2XAB transmitted the first color broadcast in the United States on August 28, 1940.

On June 24, 1941, W2XAB received a commercial construction permit and program authorization as WCBW. The station went on the air at 2:30 p.m. on July 1, an hour after rival WNBT (channel 1, formerly W2XBS and now WNBC), making it the second authorized, fully commercial television station in the United States. The FCC issued permits to CBS and NBC at the same time, and intended WNBT and WCBW to sign on simultaneously on July 1, so no one station could claim to be the "first".

CBS logo used from 1941 to 1951

During the period of the USA's participation in World War II, commercial television broadcasting was reduced dramatically. Towards the end of the war, however, it began to ramp up again, with an increased level of programming evident from 1944 to 1947 on the three New York television stations which operated in those years: the local stations of NBC, CBS and DuMont. As RCA and DuMont raced to establish networks and offer upgraded programming, CBS lagged, advocating an industry-wide shift and restart to UHF for their incompatible (with black and white) color system. The FCC putting an indefinite "freeze" on television licenses that lasted until 1952 did not help matters. Only in 1950, when NBC was dominant in television and black and white transmission was widespread, did CBS begin to buy or build their own stations (outside of New York City) in Los Angeles, Chicago, and other major cities. Up to that point, CBS programming was seen on such stations as KTTV in Los Angeles, in which CBS – as a bit of insurance and to guarantee program clearance in that market – quickly purchased a 50% interest, partnering with the Los Angeles Times. CBS then sold its interest in KTTV (now the West Coast flagship station of the Fox network) and purchased outright Los Angeles pioneer station KTSL in 1950, renaming it KNXT (after CBS's existing Los Angeles radio property KNX), later to become KCBS-TV. In 1953, CBS bought pioneer Chicago television station WBKB, which had been signed on by former investor Paramount Pictures (and would again become a sister company of CBS decades later) as a commercial station in 1946, and changed that station's call sign to WBBM-TV, moving the CBS affiliation away from WGN-TV.

WCBS-TV would ultimately be the only station (as of 2025) built and signed on by CBS. The rest of the stations would be acquired by CBS, either in an ownership stake or outright purchase. In television's early years, the network bought Washington, D.C. affiliate WOIC (now WUSA) in a joint venture with The Washington Post in 1950, only to sell its stake to the newspaper in 1954 due to tighter FCC ownership regulations. CBS would also temporarily return to relying on its own UHF technology by owning WXIX in Milwaukee (now CW affiliate WVTV) and WHCT in Hartford (now Univision affiliate WUVN). However, as UHF was not viable for broadcasting at the time (due to the fact that most television sets of the time were not equipped with UHF tuners), CBS decided to sell those stations off and affiliate with VHF stations WITI and WTIC-TV (now WFSB).

In Milwaukee alone, CBS has gone through several affiliation changes since 1953, when its original primary affiliate WCAN-TV (now defunct) first signed on the air. Prior to WCAN's sign-on, selected CBS programming aired on WTMJ-TV, an NBC affiliate since 1947. In February 1955, when WCAN went off the air for good, CBS moved its programming to WXIX, which it had purchased several months earlier. In April 1959, CBS decided to move its programming to WITI, the city's newer VHF station at the time. In turn, CBS shut down WXIX, sold its license to local investors, and returned to the air that July as an independent station. The first WITI-CBS union only lasted exactly two years, as the network moved its programming to WISN-TV on April 2, 1961, with WITI taking the ABC affiliation; the two stations reversed the network swap in March 1977, with WITI returning to the CBS station lineup. CBS was later forced back onto UHF in Milwaukee due to an affiliation agreement with New World Communications in 1994; it is now affiliated with WDJT-TV in that market, which has the longest-lasting relationship with CBS of any Milwaukee station that carried the network's programming.

More long-term, CBS bought stations in Philadelphia (WCAU, now owned by NBC) and St. Louis (KMOX-TV, now KMOV), but would eventually sell these stations off as well. Before buying KMOX-TV, CBS had attempted to purchase and sign on the channel 11 license in St. Louis, now KPLR-TV.

CBS did attempt to sign on a station in Pittsburgh after the freeze was lifted, as it was the sixth-largest market at the time, but had just one commercial VHF station in DuMont-owned WDTV, while the rest were either on UHF (the modern-day WPGH-TV and WINP-TV) or public television (WQED). Although the FCC turned down CBS's request to buy the channel 9 license in nearby Steubenville, Ohio and move it to Pittsburgh (that station, initially CBS affiliate WSTV-TV, is now NBC affiliate WTOV-TV), CBS did score a major coup when Pittsburgh-based Westinghouse Electric, co-founder of NBC, bought WDTV from struggling DuMont and opted to affiliate the now-recalled KDKA-TV with CBS instead of NBC (like KDKA radio) due to NBC extorting and coercing Westinghouse to trade KYW radio and WPTZ (now KYW-TV) for Cleveland stations WTAM, WTAM-FM (now WMJI), and WNBK (now WKYC); the trade ended up being reversed by order of the FCC and the Department of Justice in 1965 after an eight-year investigation. Had CBS not been able to affiliate with KDKA-TV, it would have affiliated with eventual NBC affiliate WIIC-TV (now WPXI) once it signed on in 1957 instead. This coup would eventually lead to a much stronger relationship between Westinghouse and CBS.

=== 1945–1970: Dominance and broad appeal ===
Logo used from 1946 to 1951

The mid-1940s "talent raid" on NBC had brought over established radio stars, who became stars of CBS television programs as well. One reluctant CBS star refused to bring her radio show My Favorite Husband to television unless the network would recast the show with her real-life husband in the lead. I Love Lucy debuted in October 1951, and was an immediate sensation, with 11 million of the 15 million total television sets watching (a 73% share). Paley and network president Frank Stanton had so little faith in the future of Lucille Ball's series that they granted her wish and allowed her husband Desi Arnaz to take financial control of the comedy's production. This was the foundation of the Ball-Arnaz Desilu empire, and is now considered a template for series production; it also served as the template for some television conventions that continue to exist including the use of multiple cameras to film scenes, the use of a studio audience, and the airing of past episodes for syndication to other television outlets. The phenomenal success of the primetime, big-money quiz show The $64,000 Question, propelled its creator Louis G. Cowan, first to an executive position as CBS's vice-president of creative services, then to the presidency of the CBS television network itself. When quiz show scandals involving "rigged" questions surfaced in 1959, he was fired by CBS.

CBS Eyemark used since 1951.

CBS dominated television, now at the forefront of American entertainment and information, as it once had radio. In 1953, the CBS television network would make its first profit, and would maintain dominance on television between 1955 and 1976. By the late 1950s, the network often controlled seven or eight of the slots on the "top ten" ratings list with well-respected shows such as Route 66.

Under James T. Aubrey (1958–1965), CBS was able to balance prestigious television projects (befitting the "Tiffany Network" image), with more low culture, broad appeal programs. As such, the network had challenging fare like The Twilight Zone, The Defenders, and East Side/West Side, as well as The Andy Griffith Show, The Beverly Hillbillies, Gomer Pyle, U.S.M.C., and Gilligan's Island.

This success would continue for many years, with CBS being bumped from first place only due to the rise of ABC in the mid-1970s. Perhaps because of its status as the top-rated network, CBS felt freer to gamble with controversial properties like the Smothers Brothers Comedy Hour and All in the Family (and its many spinoffs) during the late 1960s and early 1970s.

=== 1971–1986: "Rural purge" and ratings success ===
While its first airing in color would occur in 1951, CBS would adopt regular programming entirely in color by the 1966–1967 season.

By the end of the 1960s, CBS was very successful in television ratings, but many of its shows, including The Beverly Hillbillies, Gunsmoke, Mayberry R.F.D., Petticoat Junction, Lassie, Hee Haw, and Green Acres, were appealing to older and more rural audiences, rather than to the young, urban, and more affluent audiences that advertisers sought to target. Fred Silverman, who would later head ABC and later NBC, made the decision to cancel most of those otherwise hit shows by mid-1971 in what became colloquially referred to as the "rural purge", with Green Acres cast member Pat Buttram remarking that the network canceled "anything with a tree in it". CBS also cancelled the variety shows of Red Skelton, Ed Sullivan and Jackie Gleason not only because of aging demographics but also reportedly due to the escalating expenses of these programs.

While the "rural" shows got the axe, new hits like The Mary Tyler Moore Show, All in the Family, The Bob Newhart Show, Cannon, Barnaby Jones, Kojak, and The Sonny & Cher Comedy Hour took their place on the network's schedule and kept it at the top of the ratings through the early 1970s. The majority of these hits were overseen by then-East Coast vice president Alan Wagner. 60 Minutes also moved to the 7:00 p.m. slot on Sundays in 1975, and became the first ever primetime television news program to enter the Nielsen Top 10 in 1978.

One of CBS's most popular shows during the period was M*A*S*H, which ran for 11 seasons from 1972 to 1983, and was based on the hit Robert Altman film of the same name. The 2 1/2-hour series finale, in its initial airing on February 28, 1983, had peak viewership of up to 125 million Americans (77% of all television viewership in the U.S. that night), which established it as the most watched television episode in the United States. It also held the distinction of having the largest single-night primetime viewership of any television program in U.S. history, until it was surpassed by the Super Bowl, which has taken the record consistently since 2010 (through the annual championship game alternates between being broadcast by CBS and rival networks Fox and NBC).

Silverman also first developed his strategy of spinning new shows off from established hit series while at CBS, with Rhoda and Phyllis spun from The Mary Tyler Moore Show, Maude and The Jeffersons from All in the Family, and Good Times from Maude. After Silverman's departure, CBS dropped to second place behind ABC in the 1976–77 season, but still rated strongly, based on its earlier hits and some new ones, including One Day at a Time, Alice, Lou Grant, WKRP in Cincinnati, The Dukes of Hazzard, Trapper John, M.D. and Dallas, which was the biggest hit of the early 1980s and holds the record for the most watched non-series finale television episode in the U.S. – the primetime telecast of the resolution episode of the internationally prominent "Who Shot J.R.?" cliffhanger on November 21, 1980.

By 1982, ABC had run out of steam and NBC was in dire straits, with many failed programming efforts greenlighted by Silverman during his tenure as network president. CBS nosed ahead once more thanks to the major success of Dallas (and its spin-off Knots Landing), as well as hits in Falcon Crest, Magnum, P.I., Simon & Simon, and 60 Minutes. CBS also acquired the broadcast rights to the NCAA Division I men's basketball tournament in 1982, which it now broadcasts every March since. CBS bought Emmy-winning documentary producer Dennis B. Kane's production company and formed CBS/Kane Productions International. The network managed to pull out a few new hits over the next couple of years, including Kate & Allie, Newhart, Cagney & Lacey, Scarecrow and Mrs. King, and Murder, She Wrote. However, this resurgence was short-lived, as CBS had become mired in debt as a result of a failed takeover effort by Ted Turner, which CBS chairman Thomas Wyman successfully helped to fend off. The network sold its St. Louis owned-and-operated station KMOX-TV, and allowed the purchase of a large portion of its shares (under 25 percent) by Loew's Inc. chairman Laurence Tisch. Collaboration between Paley and Tisch led to the slow dismissal of Wyman, with Tisch taking over as chief operating officer and Paley returning as chairman.

=== 1986–2002: Tiffany Network in distress ===
CBS logo used from 1981 to 2016, used for sports programming

By the end of the 1987–88 season, CBS had fallen to third place behind both ABC and NBC for the first time. In 1984, The Cosby Show and Miami Vice debuted on NBC and immediately garnered high ratings, helping NBC rise back to first place by the 1985–86 season with a slate that included several other hits such as Night Court, Family Ties, Cheers, The Golden Girls, The Facts of Life, L.A. Law, and 227. ABC had also rebounded with hits such as Dynasty, Who's the Boss?, Hotel, Full House, Growing Pains, The Wonder Years, and Roseanne.

Some of the groundwork had been laid as CBS fell in the ratings, with hits Simon & Simon, Falcon Crest, Murder, She Wrote, Kate & Allie, and Newhart still on the schedule from the most recent resurgence, and to-be-hits Designing Women, Murphy Brown, Jake and the Fatman, and newsmagazine 48 Hours all debuting in the late 1980s. CBS was also still getting decent ratings for 60 Minutes, Dallas, and Knots Landing. During the early 1990s, CBS would bolster its sports lineup by obtaining the broadcast television rights to Major League Baseball (MLB) from ABC and NBC, and the Winter Olympics from ABC, despite losing the National Basketball Association (NBA) to NBC after the 1989–90 NBA season.

Under network president Jeff Sagansky, CBS was able to earn strong ratings from new shows Diagnosis: Murder, Dr. Quinn, Medicine Woman, Walker, Texas Ranger, Picket Fences, Northern Exposure, Evening Shade, the Royal Family and a resurgent Jake and the Fatman. CBS was briefly able to reclaim first place during the 1992–93 season. However, CBS's programming slate skewed toward an older demographic than ABC, NBC, or even the fledgling Fox network. In 1993, CBS made a breakthrough in establishing a successful late-night talk show franchise to compete with NBC's The Tonight Show when it signed David Letterman away from NBC after the Late Night host was passed over as Johnny Carson's successor on Tonight in favor of Jay Leno.

Despite having success with the Late Show with David Letterman, CBS as a whole suffered in 1993. CBS lost the rights to two major sports leagues; it terminated its rights to MLB after losing approximately $500 million over a four-year span, and MLB reached a new contract with NBC and ABC. On December 17, 1993, in a move that surprised many media analysts and television viewers, Fox – then a fledgling network which had begun to accrue several popular programs in the Nielsen Top 20 during its seven years on air – outbid CBS for the broadcast rights to the National Football Conference (NFC), stripping CBS of National Football League (NFL) telecasts for the first time since CBS began broadcasting games from the pre-merger NFL in 1955. Fox bid $1.58 billion for the NFC television rights, significantly higher than CBS's reported offer of $290 million to retain the contract.

The acquisition of the NFC rights, which took effect with the 1994 NFL season and led to CBS being nicknamed "Can't Broadcast Sports", resulted in Fox striking a series of affiliation deals with longtime affiliates of each of the Big Three networks. CBS bore the brunt of the switches, losing its Phoenix, Milwaukee, Cleveland, Detroit, Austin, Dallas-Fort Worth, Wilmington, North Carolina, Tampa-St. Petersburg, Yuma and Atlanta affiliates to Fox; eight of those stations were owned by New World Communications. Most of the stations with which CBS ended up affiliating to replace the previous affiliates it lost to Fox were former Fox affiliates and independent stations, but had limited local news presence prior to joining CBS. CBS attempted to fill its loss of the NFL by going after the rights to the National Hockey League (NHL), which it again lost to Fox. In early 1995, CBS would begin to rebuild its sports division by acquiring the rights to additional NASCAR races. However, CBS would be stripped of its contract with NASCAR in December 1999, and Fox and NBC acquired the rights in 2001.

The loss of the NFL, along with an ill-fated effort to court younger viewers, led to a drop in CBS's ratings. One of the affected shows was the Late Show with David Letterman, which saw its viewership decline in large part due to the affiliation switches, at times even landing in third place in its timeslot behind ABC's Nightline. As a result, NBC's The Tonight Show with Jay Leno, which had previously been dominated by the Late Show, became the top-rated late-night talk show. However, CBS was able to produce some hits during the mid-1990s such as Cosby, The Nanny, Chicago Hope, Cybill, JAG (which moved to the network from NBC), Touched by an Angel, and Everybody Loves Raymond.

During this time, several longtime affiliates beside the ones that were defected to Fox also defected from CBS in markets such as Anniston (WJSU-TV), Bakersfield (KERO-TV), Baltimore (WBAL-TV), Boston (WHDH-TV), Cincinnati (WCPO-TV), Denver (KMGH-TV), Eureka (KIEM-TV), Evansville (WEHT-TV), Fairbanks (KTVF), Flint (WEYI-TV), Fresno (KFSN-TV), Green Bay (WBAY-TV), Huntington (WCHS-TV), Jacksonville (WJXT), Knoxville (WBIR-TV), Louisville (WHAS-TV), Marquette (WLUC-TV), Miami (WTVJ), New Bedford (WLNE-TV), Omaha (WOWT), Philadelphia (WCAU-TV), Raleigh (WTVD-TV), Rochester (WHEC-TV), Salt Lake City (KSL-TV), Sacramento (KXTV), Seattle (KIRO-TV), Tuscaloosa (WCFT-TV) and West Palm Beach (WTVX). Most of these stations were wooed away by NBC, which had lifted out of last place to become the #1 network between the late 1980s and early 2000s, while WGWW, KERO-TV, WCPO-TV, KMGH, WEHT-TV, KFSN, WBAY, WCHS, WHAS, WLUC, WLNE, WTVD, KXTV and WCFT went to ABC, WJXT and WTVX became independent stations and KIRO and WLYH went to UPN. Ironically, WBAL was an NBC affiliate prior to swapping stations with WMAR-TV in 1981 and WBAL became a CBS affiliate, only to return to NBC in 1995. In the case of WTVD and KFSN, both station remain ABC owned and operated stations, while WCAU and WTVJ became NBC owned and operated stations. KIRO-TV had since rejoined the network, while WHDH became an independent station. In case of the two Alabama stations, it became Howard Stirk-owned stations.

During the 1997–98 season, CBS attempted to court families on Fridays with the launch of a family-oriented comedy block known as the CBS Block Party. This block consisted of shows like Family Matters, Step by Step, Meego, and The Gregory Hines Show, all but the last coming from Miller-Boyett Productions. The lineup failed to compete against ABC's TGIF lineup, as Meego and Hines were canceled by November. That winter, CBS aired its last Olympic Games to date with its telecast of the 1998 Winter Games in Nagano.

In 1997, CBS regained the NFL through its acquisition of the broadcast television rights to the American Football Conference (AFC), effective with the 1998 season. The contract was struck shortly before the AFC's emergence as the dominant NFL conference over the NFC, spurred in part by the turnaround of the New England Patriots during the 2000s. With the help of the AFC package, CBS surpassed NBC for first place in the 1998–99 season, although it was beaten by ABC the following year. CBS gained additional hits in the late 1990s and early 2000s with series such as The King of Queens, Nash Bridges, Judging Amy, Becker, and Yes, Dear.

=== 2002–present: Return to first and Fox rivalry ===
Another turning point for CBS came in the summer of 2000, when it debuted the summer reality shows Survivor and Big Brother, which became surprise summer hits for CBS. In January 2001, CBS debuted the second season of Survivor after its broadcast of Super Bowl XXXV and scheduled it on Thursdays at 8:00 p.m. Eastern Time; it also moved the investigative crime drama CSI (which had debuted that fall in the Friday 9:00 p.m. time slot) to follow Survivor at 9:00 p.m. on Thursdays. The pairing of the two shows was both able to chip away at and eventually beat NBC's Thursday night lineup.

During the 2000s, CBS found additional successes with a slew of police procedurals, several of which were produced by Jerry Bruckheimer. These included Cold Case, Without a Trace, Criminal Minds, NCIS, and The Mentalist, along with CSI spin-offs CSI: Miami and CSI: NY. CBS also featured several prominent sitcoms like Still Standing, Two and a Half Men, How I Met Your Mother, The New Adventures of Old Christine, Rules of Engagement, and The Big Bang Theory, as well as the reality show The Amazing Race. CBS's programming slate, buoyed largely by the success of CSI, briefly led it to retake first place in the ratings from NBC during the 2002–03 season. The 2000s also saw CBS finally make ratings headway on Friday nights, a perennial weak spot for CBS, with a focus toward drama series such as Ghost Whisperer and the relatively short-lived but acclaimed Joan of Arcadia.

CBS became the most watched American broadcast television network once again in the 2005–06 season. The next year, Fox overtook CBS for first place, becoming the first non-Big Three network to earn the title as the most watched network overall in the United States. Fox's first-place finish that season was primarily due to its reliance on American Idol (the longest reigning number-one primetime U.S. television program from 2004 to 2011) and the effects of the 2007–08 Writers Guild of America strike. CBS retook its place as the top-rated network in the 2008–09 season, where it has remained every season since, except 2023, when it was beaten by NBC. Fox and CBS, both having ranked as the highest rated of the major broadcast networks during the 2000s, tend to nearly equal one another in the 18–34, 18–49, and 25–54 demographics. NCIS, which has been the flagship of CBS's Tuesday lineup for much of its run, became CBS's highest-rated drama during the 2007–08 season.

CBS logo used from 2011 until 2015, using Proxima Nova Bold font. This logo was also used by CBS All Access until it rebranded as Paramount+ in 2021.

The 2010s saw additional hits for CBS, including the drama series The Good Wife; the police procedurals Person of Interest, Blue Bloods, Elementary, Hawaii Five-0, and NCIS spin-off NCIS: Los Angeles; the reality series Undercover Boss; and the sitcoms 2 Broke Girls and Mike & Molly. The Big Bang Theory, one of several sitcoms from veteran writer/producer Chuck Lorre, started off with modest ratings, but saw its viewership skyrocket, earning ratings of up to 17 million viewers per episode. It became the top-rated network sitcom in the United States by the 2010–11 season, as well as the second most watched American television program by the 2013–14 season, when the series became the anchor of the network's Thursday lineup. Meanwhile, Two and a Half Men saw its ratings decline to respectable levels for its final four seasons following the 2011 firing of original star Charlie Sheen and the addition of Ashton Kutcher as its primary lead.

Until 2012, CBS ranked in second place among adults 18–49, but after the ratings declines Fox experienced during the 2012–13 season, CBS was able to take the top spot in the demographic, as well as in total viewership (for the fifth year in a row) by the start of 2013. At the end of the 2012–13 season, the tenth season of NCIS took the top spot among the season's most watched network programs, giving CBS its first top-rated show since the 2002–03 season, when CSI: Crime Scene Investigation led Nielsen's seasonal primetime network ratings.

The strength of CBS's 2013–14 slate led to a surplus of series on its 2014–15 schedule, with 21 series held over from the previous season along with eight new series, including moderate hits in Madam Secretary, NCIS: New Orleans, and Scorpion. The network also aired midseason hits The Odd Couple and CSI spinoff CSI: Cyber. CBS also expanded its NFL coverage through a partnership with the NFL Network to carry Thursday Night Football games during the first eight weeks of the NFL season.

On September 29, 2016, National Amusements, the owner of both CBS's parent company CBS Corporation and its sister company Viacom, sent a letter to both companies, encouraging them to merge back into one company. The deal was called off on December 12. However, on January 12, 2018, it was reported that both CBS and Viacom were re-entering talks to merge. On August 13, 2019, CEO Shari Redstone announced that Viacom and CBS agreed to a merger which would reunite the two media giants after 14 years.

The two companies have also been reported as in talks to acquire Lionsgate, following the proposed acquisition of 21st Century Fox and its assets by the Walt Disney Company. Amazon, Verizon, and Comcast (the owner of NBC) have also shown interest in acquiring Lionsgate. Lionsgate Vice Chairman Michael Burns stated in an interview with CNBC that Lionsgate was mostly interested in merging with CBS and Viacom.

Chuck Lorre announced in May 2022 that B Positive and United States of Al were both cancelled by CBS after two seasons. HFPA was rebranded to Golden Globe Foundation on June 12, 2023, and after that, the Golden Globe Awards moved from NBC to CBS on January 7, 2024. Bob Hearts Abishola aired its series finale on May 6, 2024, while Young Sheldon aired its series finale on May 16, 2024. The series premiere of Georgie & Mandy's First Marriage aired on October 17, 2024, while the series premiere of Poppa's House aired on October 21, 2024.

=== CBS television news operations ===
Upon becoming commercial station WCBW in 1941, the pioneer CBS television station in New York City broadcast two daily news programs, at 2:30 and 7:30 p.m. weekdays, anchored by Richard Hubbell. Most of the newscasts featured Hubbell reading a script with only occasional cutaways to a map or still photograph. When Pearl Harbor was bombed on December 7, 1941, WCBW, usually off-the-air on Sundays to give the engineers a day off, took to the air at 8:45 p.m. that evening with an extensive special report. The national emergency even broke down the unspoken wall between CBS radio and television. WCBW executives convinced radio announcers and experts such as George Fielding Elliot and Linton Wells to come down to the station's Grand Central Station studios during the evening and to give information and commentary on the attack. Although WCBW's special report that night lasted less than 90 minutes, that special broadcast pushed the limits of live television in 1941, and opened up new possibilities for future broadcasts. As CBS wrote in a special report to the FCC, the unscheduled live news broadcast on December 7 was "unquestionably the most stimulating challenge and marked the greatest advance of any single problem faced up to that time". Additional newscasts were scheduled in the early days of the war.

In May 1942, WCBW, like almost all television stations, sharply cut back its live program schedule and canceled its newscasts, as the station temporarily suspended studio operations, resorting exclusively to the occasional broadcast of films. This was primarily because much of the staff had either joined the service or had been redeployed to war-related technical research, as well as because it was necessary to prolong the life of the cameras, which were now impossible to repair due to the lack of parts available during wartime. In May 1944, as the war began to turn in favor of the Allies, WCBW reopened its studios and resumed production of its newscasts, which were briefly anchored by Ned Calmer and then by Everett Holles. After the war, WCBW, which changed its call letters to WCBS-TV in 1946, introduced expanded news programs on its schedule. These were first anchored by Milo Boulton and later by Douglas Edwards. On May 3, 1948, Edwards began anchoring CBS Television News, a regular 15-minute nightly newscast on the rudimentary CBS television network, including WCBS-TV. Airing every weeknight at 7:30 p.m., it was the first regularly scheduled, network television news program featuring an anchor; the nightly Lowell Thomas NBC radio network newscast was simulcast on television locally on NBC's WNBT (now WNBC) for a time in the early 1940s, and Hubbell, Calmer, Holles and Boulton on WCBW in the early and mid-1940s, but these were local television broadcasts seen only in the New York City area. In contrast, the NBC Television Newsreel, the NBC television network's offering at the time which premiered in February 1948, was simply film footage with voice narration to provide illustration of the stories. In 1949, CBS offered the first live television coverage of the proceedings of the United Nations General Assembly. This journalistic tour-de-force was under the direction of Edmund A. Chester, who was appointed to the post of Director for News, Special Events, and Sports at CBS Television in 1948.

CBS logo used from 2015 until 2020, using Gotham Bold font. Although it was replaced by TT Norms Pro version of CBS logo on October 8, 2020, this logo still commonly in use for unofficial publication purposes.

In 1950, the nightly newscast was retitled Douglas Edwards with the News, and became the first news program to be broadcast on both coasts the following year, thanks to a new coaxial cable connection. As such, Edwards used the greeting "Good evening everyone, coast to coast". The broadcast was renamed the CBS Evening News when Walter Cronkite replaced Edwards in 1962. Edwards remained with CBS News as anchor/reporter for various daytime television and radio news broadcasts until his retirement on April 1, 1988.

=== Color technology (1953–1967) ===
Although CBS Television was the first with a working color television system, the network lost out to RCA in 1953, in part because its color system was incompatible with existing black-and-white sets. Although RCA – then the parent company of NBC – made its color system available to CBS, the network was not interested in boosting RCA's profits, and televised only a few specials in color for the rest of the decade.

The specials included the Ford Star Jubilee programs (which included the first ever telecast of The Wizard of Oz), as well as the 1957 telecast of Rodgers and Hammerstein's Cinderella, Cole Porter's musical version of Aladdin, and Playhouse 90's only color broadcast, the 1958 production of The Nutcracker. The Nutcracker telecast (hosted by June Lockhart) was based on the famous production staged annually since 1954 in New York, and performed by the New York City Ballet. CBS would later show two other versions of the ballet, a one-hour German-American version hosted by Eddie Albert, shown annually for three years beginning in 1965, and the popular Mikhail Baryshnikov production from 1977 to 1981.

Beginning in 1959, The Wizard of Oz became an annual tradition on color television. It had been the success of NBC's 1955 telecast of the musical Peter Pan, which became the most watched television special of its time, that inspired CBS to telecast The Wizard of Oz, Cinderella, and Aladdin.

From 1960 to 1965, the CBS television network limited its color broadcasts to only a few special presentations such as The Wizard of Oz, and only if the sponsor would pay for it. In the early 1960s, Red Skelton was the first CBS host to telecast his weekly programs in color using a converted movie studio. He tried unsuccessfully to persuade the network to use his facility for other programs, and was forced to sell it. Rival NBC was pushing for the use of color at the time. Even ABC had several color programs beginning in the fall of 1962, although those were limited due to financial and technical issues the network was going through. One particularly notable television special aired by CBS during this era was the Charles Collingwood-hosted tour of the White House with First Lady Jackie Kennedy, which was broadcast in black and white.

Beginning in 1963, The Lucy Show began filming in color at the insistence of its star and producer Lucille Ball, who realized that color episodes would command more money when they were eventually sold into syndication. Even this show, however, was broadcast in black and white through the end of the 1964–65 season. This would all change by the mid-1960s, when market pressure forced CBS Television to begin adding color programs to its regular schedule for the 1965–66 season and complete the transition to the format during the 1966–67 season. By the fall of 1967, nearly all of CBS's television programs were in color, as was the case with those aired by NBC and ABC. A notable exception was The Twentieth Century, which consisted mostly of newsreel archival footage, but even this program used at least some color footage by the late 1960s. CBS, which had reluctantly purchased a handful of the early RCA color cameras from its archrival in the 1950s, began deploying the new color studio cameras from Philips by 1965, which bore the Norelco brand name at that time.

In 1965, CBS telecast a new color version of Rodgers and Hammerstein's Cinderella. This version, starring Lesley Ann Warren and Stuart Damon in the roles formerly played by Julie Andrews and Jon Cypher, was shot on videotape (at its Television City complex in Los Angeles) rather than being telecast live, and would become an annual tradition on the network for the next nine years.

In 1967, NBC outbid CBS for the rights to the annual telecast of The Wizard of Oz, and the film moved to NBC beginning the following year. However, in 1976, CBS reacquired the television rights to the film, with the network continuing to broadcast it through the end of 1997. CBS aired The Wizard of Oz twice in 1991, in March and again the night before Thanksgiving. Thereafter, it was broadcast the night before Thanksgiving.

By the end of the 1960s, CBS was broadcasting virtually its entire programming lineup in color.

== Conglomerate ==
In the mid-1950s CBS reorganized into various divisions, each with much autonomy. Prior to the 1960s, the company's acquisitions, such as American Record Corporation and Hytron, had mostly related to its broadcasting business. During the 1950s and early 1960s, CBS did operate a CBS-Columbia division, which manufactured phonographs, radios, and television sets; however, the company had problems with product quality, and CBS never achieved much success in that field. In 1955, CBS purchased animation studio Terrytoons from its founder Paul Terry, not only acquiring Terry's 25-year backlog of cartoons for the network, but continuing the studio's ongoing contract to provide theatrical cartoons for 20th Century Fox well into the 1960s.

During the 1960s, CBS began an effort to diversify its portfolio and looked for suitable investments. In 1965, CBS acquired electric guitar maker Fender from Leo Fender, who agreed to sell his company due to health problems. The purchase also included that of Rhodes electric pianos, which had already been acquired by Fender. The quality of the products manufactured by these acquired companies fell dramatically, resulting in the terms "pre-CBS" to refer to products of higher quality and "CBS" for mass-produced products of lower quality.

In other diversification attempts, CBS would buy and later sell a variety of other properties. This included sports teams, especially the New York Yankees baseball club; book and magazine publishers, such as Fawcett Publications, which included Woman's Day, and Holt, Rinehart and Winston); map-makers and toy manufacturers like Gabriel Toys, Child Guidance, Wonder Products, Gym Dandy, and Ideal; X-Acto; and distributors of educational films and film strips, namely Bailey Films Inc. and Film Associates of California. CBS eventually merged the two film companies into a single company, BFA Educational Media. CBS also developed an early home video system called EVR (Electronic Video Recording), but was never able to launch it successfully.

Paley and Stanton fired Aubrey in 1965 after a successful but controversial career; among the reasons was Paley's reported fear that Aubrey would take over CBS if something were to happen to them. Paley attempted to find the one person who could follow in his footsteps. However, numerous successors-in-waiting came and went. By the mid-1980s, investor Laurence Tisch had begun to acquire substantial holdings in CBS. Eventually, he gained Paley's confidence and, with his support, took control of CBS in 1986. Tisch's primary interest was turning profits. When CBS faltered, underperforming units were given the ax. Among the first properties to be jettisoned was the Columbia Records group, which had been part of the company since 1938. In 1986, Tisch also shut down the CBS Technology Center in Stamford, Connecticut, which had started in New York City in the 1930s as CBS Laboratories and had evolved to become the company's technology research and development unit.

Through its CBS Productions unit, the company produced a few shows for non-CBS networks, like NBC's Caroline in the City.

=== Columbia Records ===
Columbia Records was acquired by CBS in 1938. In 1962, CBS launched CBS Records International to market Columbia recordings outside of North America, where the Columbia name was controlled by other entities. In 1966, CBS Records was made a separate subsidiary of the Columbia Broadcasting System. CBS sold the CBS Records Group to Sony on November 17, 1987, initiating a Japanese buying spree of American companies, including MCA, Pebble Beach Co., Rockefeller Center, and even the Empire State Building, which continued into the 1990s. The record company was rechristened as Sony Music Entertainment in 1991, as Sony had a short-term license on the CBS name.

Sony purchased its rights to the Columbia Records name outside the United States, Canada, Spain and Japan from EMI. Sony now uses Columbia Records as a label name in all countries except Japan, where Sony Records remains their flagship label. Sony acquired the Spanish rights when Sony Music merged with Bertelsmann subsidiary BMG in 2004 as Sony BMG; Sony bought out BMG's share in 2008. CBS Corporation formed a new record label named CBS Records in 2006.

=== Publishing ===
In 1967, CBS entered the publishing business by acquiring Holt, Rinehart & Winston, a publisher of trade books and textbooks, as well as the magazine Field & Stream. The following year, CBS acquired the medical publishing company Saunders and merged it with Holt, Rinehart & Winston. In 1971, CBS acquired Bond/Parkhurst, the publisher of Road & Track and Cycle World. CBS greatly expanded its magazine business by purchasing Fawcett Publications in 1974, bringing in such magazines as Woman's Day. In 1982, CBS acquired British publisher Cassell from Macmillan Inc. In 1984, it acquired the majority of the publications owned by Ziff Davis.

CBS sold its book publishing businesses in 1985. The educational publishing division, which retained the Holt, Rinehart & Winston name, was sold to Harcourt Brace Jovanovich; the American trade book division, renamed Henry Holt and Company, was sold to the West German publisher Holtzbrinck. Cassell was sold in a management buyout. CBS exited the magazine business through the sale of the unit to its executive Peter Diamandis, who later sold the magazines to Hachette Filipacchi Médias in 1988, forming Hachette Filipacchi Media U.S.

=== CBS Musical Instruments division ===
Forming the CBS Musical Instruments division, the company also acquired Fender (1965–1983), Electro-Music Inc. (Leslie speakers) (1965–1980), Rogers Drums (1966–1983), Steinway pianos (1972–1985), Gemeinhardt flutes, Lyon & Healy harps (in the late 1970s), Rodgers (institutional) organs, and Gulbransen home organs. The company's last musical instrument manufacturer purchase was its 1981 acquisition of the assets of then-bankrupt ARP Instruments, a developer of electronic synthesizers.

It is widely held that the quality of Fender guitars and amplifiers declined significantly between 1965 and 1985, outraging Fender fans. Because of this, CBS Musical Instruments division executives executed a leveraged buyout in 1985, and created Fender Musical Instruments Corporation. At the same time, CBS divested itself of Rodgers, along with Steinway and Gemeinhardt, all of which were purchased by holding company Steinway Musical Properties. The other musical instrument manufacturing properties were also liquidated.

=== Film production ===
CBS made a brief, unsuccessful move into film production in the late 1960s, when they created Cinema Center Films. The studio released such films as the 1969 Steve McQueen drama The Reivers and the 1970 Albert Finney musical Scrooge. This profitless unit was shut down in 1972; the distribution rights to the Cinema Center library today rest with Paramount Pictures for home video (via CBS Home Entertainment) and theatrical release, and with CBS Television Distribution for television syndication; most other ancillary rights remain with CBS.

Ten years after Cinema Center ceased operations, in 1982, CBS tried again to break into the film industry by co-founding TriStar Pictures, a joint venture with Columbia Pictures and HBO of Time Inc. Despite releasing box office successes such as The Natural, Places in the Heart, and Rambo: First Blood Part II, CBS felt the studio was not making a profit, and sold its stake in TriStar to Columbia Pictures' then-corporate parent The Coca-Cola Company in 1985. Today, TriStar is now under Sony Pictures Entertainment.

In 2007, CBS Corporation announced its intent to re-enter the feature film business, slowly launching CBS Films and hiring key executives in the spring of 2008 to start up the new venture. The CBS Films name had been used previously in 1953, when it was briefly used as CBS's distributor of off-network and first-run syndicated programming to local television stations in the United States and internationally.

=== Home video ===
CBS entered into the home video market when it partnered with Metro-Goldwyn-Mayer (MGM) to form MGM/CBS Home Video in 1978. The joint venture was dissolved in 1982, after MGM purchased United Artists (UA). CBS later partnered with 20th Century Fox to form CBS/Fox Video. CBS's duty was to release some of the film titles released by TriStar Pictures under the CBS/Fox Video label.

=== CBS Toys Division ===
The CBS Toys Division of CBS Inc. purchased Child Guidance, Creative Playthings of Framingham, Massachusetts and Hagerstown, Maryland; Gilbert; Gym-Dandy of Bossier City, Louisiana; Hubley; Ideal; Kohner; and Wonder Products of Collierville, Tennessee.

CBS entered the video game market briefly through its acquisition of Gabriel Toys (renamed CBS Toys). It published several arcade adaptations and original titles under the name CBS Electronics for the Atari 2600 and other consoles and computers; it also produced one of the first karaoke players. CBS Electronics also distributed all Coleco-related video game products in Canada, including the ColecoVision. CBS later sold Gabriel Toys to View-Master, which eventually ended up as part of Mattel.

=== New owners ===
By the early 1990s, profits had fallen as a result of competition from cable television and video rentals, as well as the high cost of programming. About 20 former CBS affiliates switched to the rapidly rising Fox network in the mid-1990s, the first of which were reportedly KDFX in Palm Springs, California, and KECY in Yuma, Arizona, which made the switch in August 1994. Many other television markets lost their CBS affiliate for a while. The network's ratings were acceptable, but it struggled with an image of stodginess. Laurence Tisch lost interest and sought a new buyer.

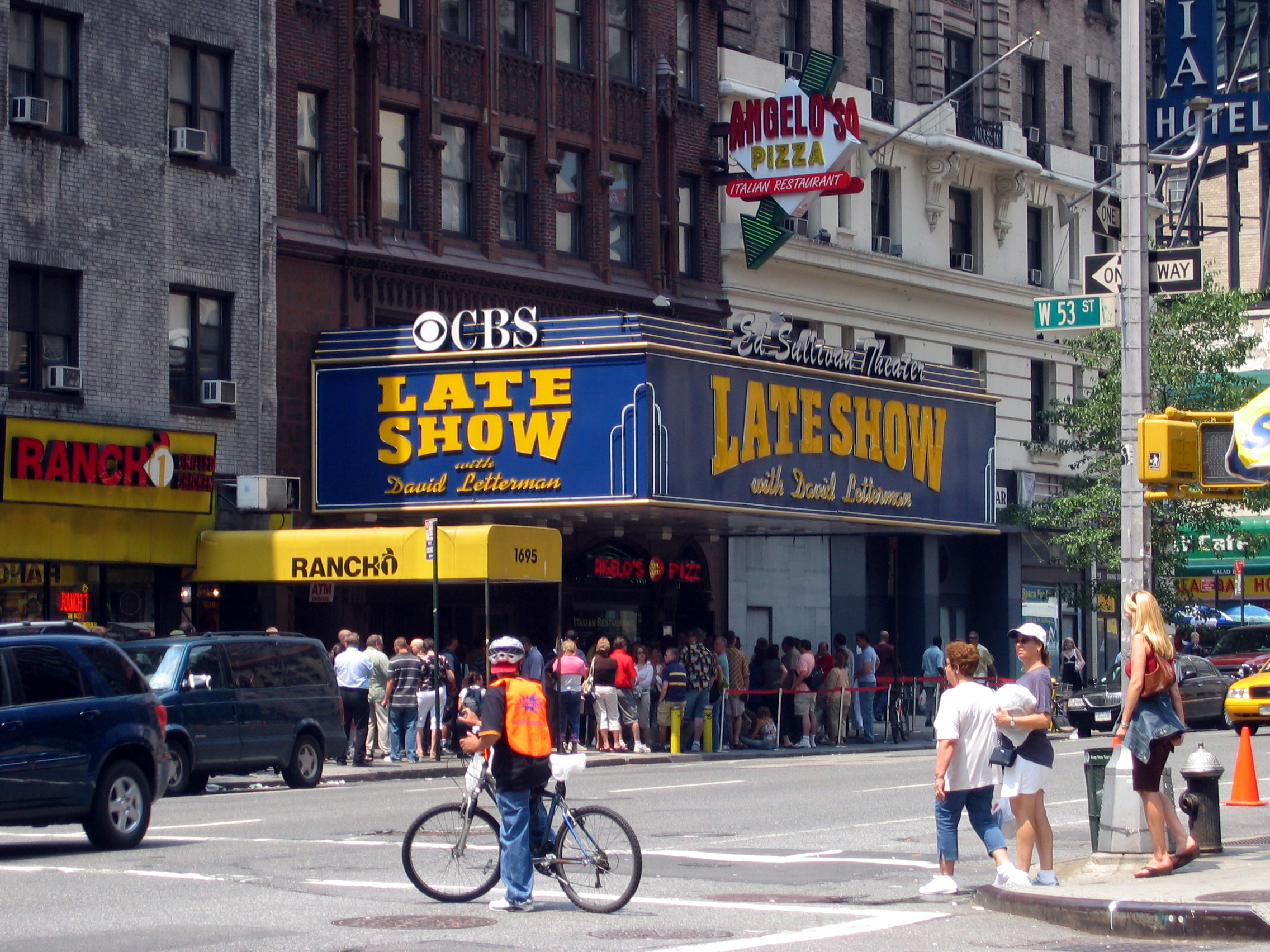
The Ed Sullivan Theater in Manhattan, the former studio of the Late Show with David Letterman which now houses The Late Show with Stephen Colbert

==== Westinghouse Electric Corporation ====
In the mid-1990s, CBS formed an affiliate relationship with the Westinghouse Electric Corporation partially in reaction to a 1994 agreement between Fox and New World Communications, which resulted in the loss of many of CBS's longtime affiliates owned by New World.

In response, CBS began affiliating with UHF stations in Detroit and Cleveland, namely former Fox affiliate WOIO and low-rated ethnic independent WGPR-TV (now WWJ-TV), which CBS eventually purchased. This was, however, only after CBS failed to woo WXYZ-TV and WEWS-TV, the respective longtime ABC affiliates in those markets (the latter of which had been a CBS affiliate from 1947 to 1955), to replace departing affiliates WJBK and WJW-TV. The E. W. Scripps Company actually used this situation as leverage to sign a group-wide affiliation deal with ABC that kept the network on WXYZ and WEWS.

Included in the Scripps deal was Baltimore NBC affiliate WMAR-TV, which had been affiliated with CBS from 1948 to 1981. With this agreement, WMAR-TV was able to displace longtime ABC affiliate and Westinghouse-owned WJZ-TV, which had long been the Baltimore market's dominant station, while WMAR-TV had been in a distant third and had even nearly lost its broadcast license in 1991. WJZ-TV's loss of the ABC affiliation did not sit well with Westinghouse. Even before the New World deal, the company had been seeking a group-wide affiliation deal of its own, but it accelerated the process after the Scripps–ABC agreement.

In July 1994, Westinghouse signed a long-term deal to affiliate all five of its television stations, including WJZ-TV, with CBS. KPIX in San Francisco and KDKA-TV in Pittsburgh were already longtime affiliates of the network, while KYW-TV in Philadelphia and WBZ-TV in Boston were longtime affiliates of NBC. The network decided to sell off its Philadelphia owned-and-operated station WCAU to NBC, even though it was rated much higher locally than KYW-TV at the time. While WJZ-TV and WBZ-TV switched to CBS in January 1995, the KYW-TV swap was delayed after CBS discovered that an outright sale of channel 10 would have resulted in massive taxes on the proceeds from the deal. To solve this, CBS, NBC, and Westinghouse, known also as Group W, entered into a complex ownership/affiliation deal in November 1994 (which was scheduled to take effect in the fall of 1995). NBC traded KCNC-TV in Denver and KUTV in Salt Lake City (which had been acquired by NBC earlier that year) to CBS in return for WCAU, which, for legal reasons, was considered an even trade. CBS then traded controlling interest in KCNC and KUTV to Group W in return for a minority stake in KYW-TV. As compensation for the loss of stations, NBC and CBS traded transmitter facilities in Miami, with the NBC-owned WTVJ moving to channel 6 and the CBS-owned WCIX moving to channel 4 as WFOR-TV.

On August 1, 1995, Westinghouse announced it was acquiring CBS outright for $5.4 billion; the deal was completed on November 24. Under the name Group W, it had been one of the major broadcasting group owners of commercial radio and television stations since 1920, and was seeking to transition from a station operator to a major media company with its purchase of CBS. Except for KUTV, which CBS sold to Four Points Media Group in 2007 and is now owned by Sinclair Broadcast Group, all of the stations involved in the initial Westinghouse deal as well as WWJ-TV remain owned-and-operated stations of the network to this day.

Westinghouse's acquisition of CBS turned the combined company's all-news radio stations in New York City (WCBS and WINS) and Los Angeles (KNX and KFWB) from bitter rivals to sister stations. While KFWB switched from all-news to news/talk in 2009, WINS and WCBS remain all-news stations. WINS, which had pioneered the all-news format in 1965, generally restricts its news coverage to the five core New York City boroughs, while WCBS, with its much more powerful signal, covers the surrounding tri-state metropolitan area. In Chicago, Westinghouse's WMAQ began to feature long-form stories and discussions about the news. It often focused on business news so as to differentiate itself from WBBM. This lasted until 2000, when an FCC ownership situation resulted in CBS Radio's decision to move its all-sports network WSCR to WMAQ's signal and to sell off the former WSCR facility.

In 1997, Westinghouse acquired the Infinity Broadcasting Corporation, which owned more than 150 radio stations, for $4.9 billion. Also that year, Westinghouse created CBS Cable, a division formed upon the acquisition of the Nashville Network (now Paramount Network) and Country Music Television from the Gaylord Entertainment Company, and the creation of CBS Eye on People, which was later sold to Discovery Communications. CBS also owned the Spanish-language news network CBS Telenoticias.

Following the Infinity purchase, operation and sales responsibilities for the CBS Radio Network were handed to Infinity, which turned management over to Westwood One, a major radio program syndicator that Infinity managed. Westwood One had previously purchased the Mutual Broadcasting System, NBC's radio networks, and the rights to use the "NBC Radio Networks" name. For a time, CBS Radio, NBC Radio Networks, and CNN's radio news services were all under the Westwood One umbrella. As of 2008, Westwood One continues to distribute CBS radio programming, but as a self-managed company that put itself up for sale and found a buyer for a significant amount of its stock. The same year the company purchased Infinity, Westinghouse changed its name to CBS Corporation, and its corporate headquarters were moved from Pittsburgh to New York City. To underline the change in emphasis, all non-entertainment assets were put up for sale. Another 90 radio stations were added to Infinity's portfolio in 1998, with the acquisition of American Radio Systems Corporation for $2.6 billion.

In 1999, CBS paid $2.5 billion to acquire King World Productions, a television syndication company whose programs included The Oprah Winfrey Show, Jeopardy!, and Wheel of Fortune. By the end of 1999, apart from the retention of rights to the name for brand licensing purposes, all pre-CBS elements of Westinghouse's industrial past were gone.

==== Viacom ====
By the 1990s, CBS had become a broadcasting giant. However, in 1999, entertainment conglomerate Viacom, which had been created by CBS in 1952 as CBS Television Film Sales to syndicate old CBS series and was eventually spun off under the Viacom name in 1971, announced it was taking over its former parent in a deal valued at $37 billion. Completed on April 26, 2000, upon which Viacom became the second largest entertainment company in the world. Incidentally, Viacom had purchased Paramount Pictures, which had once invested in CBS, in 1994.

==== CBS Corporation ====
CBS logo used from 2018 until 2020, using Garage Gothic font. Used concurrently with 2015 logo until it was rebranded on October 8, 2020.

Having assembled all the elements of a communications empire, Viacom found that the promised synergy was not there. As such, in 2005, Viacom announced it would split the company into two separately operated but commonly controlled entities, with CBS becoming the center of CBS Corporation. As the legal successor to the old Viacom, the company's properties included the broadcasting entities (CBS and UPN, the latter of which later merged with Time Warner-owned WB to form the CW; the Viacom Television Stations Group, which became CBS Television Stations; and CBS Radio); Paramount Television's production operations (now known as CBS Studios); Viacom Outdoor advertising (renamed CBS Outdoor); Showtime Networks; Simon & Schuster; and Paramount Parks, which the company sold on June 30, 2006 to Cedar Fair. The other company, which retained the Viacom name, kept Paramount Pictures, assorted MTV Networks, BET Networks, and Famous Music, the last of which was sold to Sony/ATV Music Publishing in May 2007.

As a result of the Viacom/CBS corporate split and other recent acquisitions, CBS (under the moniker CBS Studios) owns a massive film and television library spanning nine decades. These include acquired material from Viacom and CBS in-house productions and network programs, as well as programs produced by Paramount and others originally aired on competing networks such as ABC and NBC. Series and other material in this library include I Love Lucy, The Honeymooners, The Twilight Zone, Hawaii Five-O (both the original and current remake), Gunsmoke, The Fugitive, The Love Boat, Little House on the Prairie (U.S. television rights only), Cheers, Becker, Family Ties, Happy Days and its spin-offs, The Brady Bunch, Star Trek, The Young Indiana Jones Chronicles (distribution rights on behalf of copyright holder Lucasfilm), Evening Shade, Duckman, CSI: Crime Scene Investigation and its spin-offs, the CBS theatrical library (including My Fair Lady and Scrooge), Judge Judy, Judge Joe Brown, Judge Mills Lane, and the entire Terrytoons library from 1930 forward.

==== Paramount Global and CBS Studios ====
Paramount Global was owned by National Amusements, the Sumner Redstone-owned company that controlled the original Viacom prior to the split. Paramount Home Entertainment continues to handle DVD and Blu-ray distribution for the CBS library.

In August 2019, Viacom and CBS reunited as ViacomCBS to invest in more films and television and to become a bigger player in the growing business of streaming video. The deal was completed on December 4, 2019. On February 16, 2022, ViacomCBS was renamed to Paramount Global. Paramount Global has a combined library with over 140,000 television episodes and 3,600 film titles, including the Star Trek and Mission: Impossible franchises.

==== Skydance Corporation ====
In July 2024, it was announced that Paramount Global would merge with Skydance Media. The deal was closed on August 7, 2025, forming Paramount Skydance. On October 6, 2026, Paramount Skydance acquired Warner Bros. Discovery and was renamed to Skydance.
