= Palina =

Palina may refer to the following people

- Palina Pivavarava (born 1994), Belarusian track cyclist
- Palina Rojinski (born 1985), Russian-German television presenter, actress, model, and DJ
- Irina Palina (born 1970), Russian table tennis player

== See also ==
- La Palina, a brand of American cigars
