= MFC =

MFC may refer to:

== Companies ==
- Manulife Financial Corporation, a Canadian multinational insurance company
- MicroFinance Centre social finance network based in Poland co-funded by the European Union
- MyFreeCams, an American website providing live webcam performances by models

== Computing ==
- Mel-frequency cepstrum, a representation of sounds used in applications such as automatic speech recognition
- Memory flow controller, a part of a computer architecture, e.g. in the Cell Broadband Engine
- Merged From Current, a term in a development model of FreeBSD
- Microsoft Foundation Class Library, a programming library for C++
- Michael F. Cowlishaw, a computer scientist with a 'difficult' surname and so widely known by his 'handle', mfc
- Multi-Function-Centre, a series of multifunction printers made by Brother Industries
- Multi Format Codec, an intellectual property core present within the Samsung Exynos SoCs to offer hardware accelerated encoding and decoding of video formats such as MPEG-2, MPEG-4, H.263, H.264, VC-1 and VP8
- Multicast forwarding cache, ip addresses and routes for IGMP and IGMP-proxy

== Industry ==
- Mass flow controller, a device that controls gas flow
- Melamine faced chipboard, construction material usually used internally for shelving
- Micro fibrillated cellulose, a type of nanocellulose

== Military ==
- Lockheed Martin Missiles and Fire Control, a business unit
- Medical Forces Command, a specialist corps in the Ukrainian Armed Forces

== Science ==
- Microbial fuel cell, a bio-electrochemical system that generates a current by mimicking bacterial interactions

== Sports ==
- M'lang F.C., an association football club from the Philippines
- Macarthur FC, an Australian association football club in the A-League
- Macclesfield F.C., an English football club in the National League Notrh
- Makati F.C., an association football youth club from the Philippines
- Malappuram FC, an Indian professional football club in the Super League Kerala
- Malachians F.C., an association football club from Northern Ireland
- Malaysia Futsal Cup, a sport competition in Malaysia
- Maghull F.C., an English football club in the West Cheshire League Division One
- Magwe F.C., an association football club from Myanmar
- Manawmye F.C., an association football club from Myanmar
- Margate F.C., an association football club in the Isthmian League
- Marine F.C., an English football club in the Northern Premier League Premier Division
- Maximum Fighting Championship, formerly Mixed Fighting Championship, a Canadian mixed martial arts promotion
- Melbourne Football Club, an Australian rules football club in the Australian Football League (AFL)
- Mendiola F.C. 1991, an association football club from the Philippines
- Meridian F.C., an English football club in the Kent Invicta League
- Middlesbrough F.C., an English football club in the Football League Championship
- Millwall F.C., an English football club in Football League Championship
- Milltown F.C., a Northern Irish football club
- Milltown F.C., a Canadian football club
- Moneyslane F.C., a Northern Irish football club
- Montrose F.C., a Scottish semi-professional football team in the Scottish Football League
- Morecambe F.C., an English football club in Football League One
- Mossley F.C., an association football club in Northern Ireland
- Motherwell F.C., a Scottish professional football club in the Scottish Premier League

== Other uses ==
- Machine finished coated paper, a type of coated paper that has a basis weight of 48–80 g/m2
- Manual fare collection in transport
- Manufacturer change, in terms of pharmaceuticals
- Marginal factor cost
- Master of Finance and Control, a course in finance run by the Department of Financial Studies of the University of Delhi
- "MFC" (song), a Pearl Jam song
- Music for Cars, an EP from The 1975

== See also ==
- NFC (disambiguation)
