= Craig Allen (meteorologist) =

American television & radio meteorologist (born 1957)

Craig Allen (born January 25, 1957, Brooklyn, New York) is a meteorologist whose weather reports used to be heard weekdays on WCBS Newsradio 880 (880 AM radio) in New York City and globally on Audacy.com. WCBS-880 suddenly left the airwaves in August 2024. He continued to provide the CBS News Radio Network with briefings and in depth coverage of major weather events, heard on over 700 stations across the country. Allen has also returned to CBS News-New York, part-time First Alert forecaster for CBS2.

Allen previously worked for WCBS-TV until September 2006 including CBS This Morning from 1996 to 1999. He has also done part time work for WNYW-TV and was the weekend meteorologist at WPIX-TV from 2010 to 2020. Allen is a graduate of Farmingdale High School. He earned his bachelor's degree from Stony Brook University in 1979 and was the chief meteorologist on WCBS-880 since 1981.

On April 27, 2024, Allen began his 43rd year with WCBS-AM/880. Since WCBS-AM is no longer on air, Allen is now providing WBBR/1130 (Bloomberg Radio) with in depth briefings concerning hazardous weather and continues to be one of the longest running meteorologists on radio in the country according to CBS News, the New York Daily News, and an interview with Jerry Barmash from the New York Examiner/Fish Bowl NY.

== See also ==
- New Yorkers in journalism
