= Alfred H. Grebe =

Radio pioneer

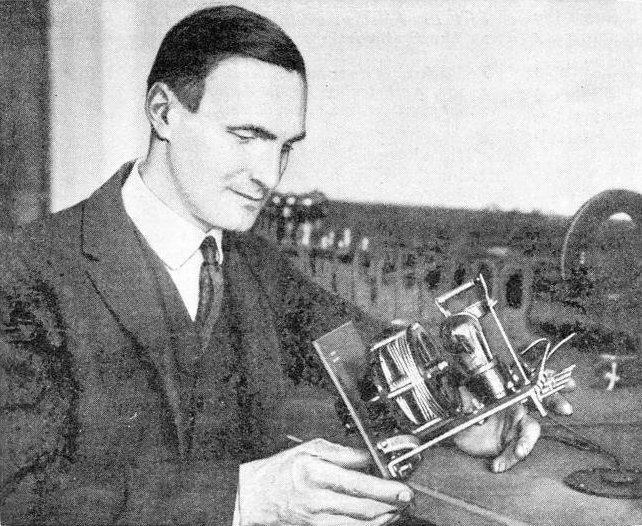
- Grebe in 1924.
- Born: 1895; New York City, U.S.
- Died: October 24, 1935 (aged 39–40); New York City, U.S.
- Occupations: Radio engineer, inventor, businessman
- Known for: Founder of A. H. Grebe and Co. Inc.
- Spouse: Stephanie Scheuerlein (m. 1921; died 1935)
- Children: 3

Alfred Henry Grebe, Sr. (/ˈɡriːbi/ GREE-bee; 1895–October 24, 1935) was a pioneer in the radio broadcasting field.

== Early life ==
Grebe was born in 1895 in the Richmond Hill neighborhood of Queens, New York City, to Henry Greb, a horticulturist, and Anna Marie Krick Grebe. At age 12, two years after his father's death in 1905, Grebe began to make his own radios. He converted a greenhouse into a radio shack, where he and other boys also interested in radio met.

== Education and career ==
Following his graduation from P.S. 88 in Jamaica, Grebe attended the Jamaica Training School and took courses at the Marconi Radio Institute in Manhattan. At age 15, he obtained a license as a commercial operator and was hired by the United Wireless Telegraph Company as a ship's radio operator. After United Wireless went bankrupt in 1912, Grebe began working for Telefunken and spent three years onboard the British tramp tanker Saranac, traveling as far as India. He returned to Sayville, Long Island, where he worked as an operator at the first commercial station on the island.

During the radio craze of the time, Grebe's friends asked him to make receivers for them. After producing several sets, he decided to enter commercial production himself.

In 1914 he issued his first catalog, and set up a factory in Richmond Hill on the same property where his home was located, which soon became able to produce all the components needed to assemble a radio, and which contained research laboratories as well. By 1922 he tore down his home to build a larger factory on the site.

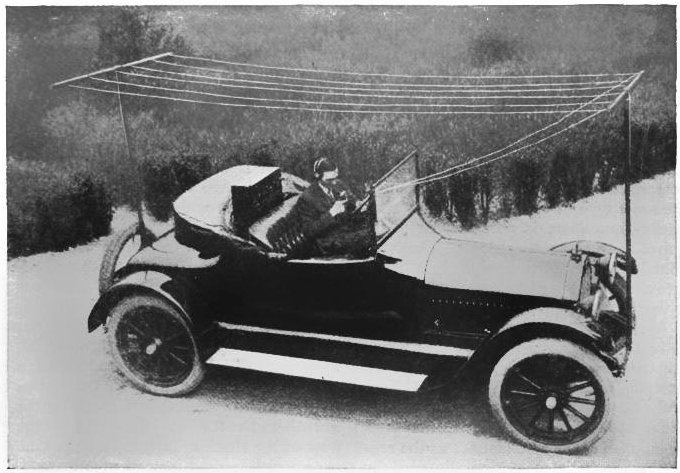
With self-built car radio, 1919

To stimulate public interest, he set up several radio stations. One, WAHG, was identified with his own initials; another, WBOQ, had call letters standing for Borough of Queens. WAHG is now WHSQ, still a major radio station in New York City. He set up a broadcasting company called the "Atlantic Broadcasting Corporation," changing WAHG to WABC on November 1, 1926, which operated his stations until he sold them to CBS in January 1929. A different WABC was later formed as the flagship station for the eponymous "American Broadcasting Company."

Grebe's publicity manager, Bill Schudt, Jr., stayed with CBS after the sale of WABC. When television station W2XAB began experiments in 1931, Schudt became CBS' first television director. He retired from the network in 1966 as director of affiliate relations.

Alfred Grebe's manufacturing company, A. H. Grebe and Co. Inc., was renamed Grebe Radio and Television Corporation and moved from Richmond Hill to Manhattan in 1933.

== Personal life ==
Grebe married Stephanie Scheuerlein in 1921. They had three children: Stephanie, Camille, and Alfred Jr.,

== Death ==
In 1935 Grebe underwent a stomach operation at Post-Graduate Hospital in Manhattan. He became ill after the operation and died after 10 days.

== Legacy ==
In 2017, Grebe was honored as "The Father of NewsRadio880" during a series commemorating the 50th anniversary of WCBS going all news.
