= M. Sayle Taylor =

American radio personality (1889–1942)

- Born: Marion Sayle Taylor; August 16, 1889; Louisville, Kentucky, U.S.
- Died: February 1, 1942 (aged 52); Hollywood, Los Angeles, U.S.
- Resting place: Forest Lawn Memorial Park; Glendale, California, U.S.
- Education: William Jewell College; Central Missouri State Teachers College; Oregon Agricultural College; University of Oregon
- Alma mater: Pacific University (BA)
- Occupations: Radio host; educator; writer; columnist
- Known for: host of The Voice of Experience radio show
- Spouse(s): Pauline; Jessie W. Mildred
- Children: 2

Marion Sayle Taylor (August 16, 1889 – February 1, 1942) operated The Voice of Experience, a radio advice show on CBS, then NBC and finally on Mutual.

== Early life ==
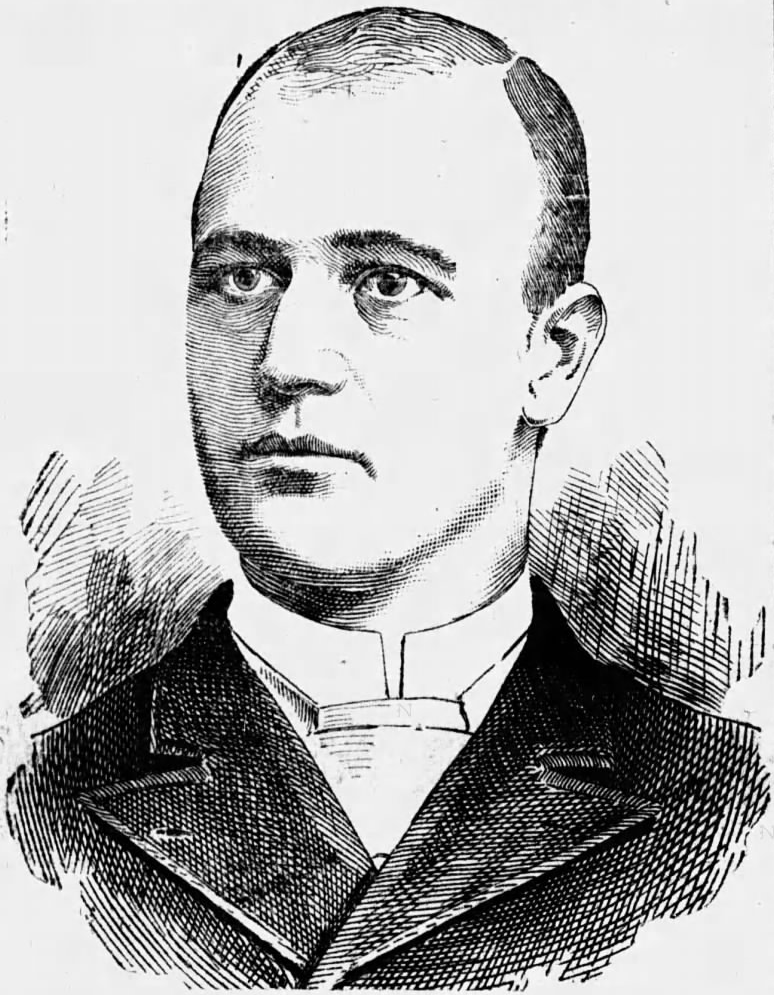
Francis W. Taylor, father of M. Sayle Taylor

Marion Sayle Taylor was born on August 16, 1889, in Louisville, Kentucky, to Addie T. (née Macklin) and Francis W. Taylor. His father was a traveling Baptist preacher. Around 1900, the family lived in Henderson, Kentucky, for four years. While in Henderson, he studied music under Henry E. von Tobel. He studied at William Jewell College in Liberty, Missouri, in the 1900s. While attending, William Jewell College, he played piano and organ on the side to make money. He preached with his father and played the organ at his father's meetings. He then spent a term at Central Missouri State Teachers College in Warrensburg, Missouri. Taylor then attended Pacific University in Oregon to study surgery. He graduated there in 1911 with a Bachelor of Arts. At the age of 19, he crushed his hands in an accident and he could not practice surgery or music. He did post-graduate work at Oregon Agricultural College and the University of Oregon. He was a member of Phi Gamma Delta and Alpha Phi Omega.

== Career ==
After graduating, Taylor taught in Klamath Falls and was principal of Amity High School in Oregon. He also taught in Newberg and Portland. He became superintendent of schools in North Bend and in Marshfield. He was captain of the Coos Bay Pirates and state president of the Oregon Boosters Club. He left Coos County in 1926.

In Seattle, in 1922, he first broadcast his radio advice show The Voice of Experience. His show was later picked up by CBS. It was also published on NBC, Mutual Broadcasting System and a coast-to-coast Canadian network. In 1938, he did a speaking tour in Oregon. He composed the "My Guiding Star" theme song used in his broadcasts. Late in 1941, he stopped broadcasting. Prior to his death, he was planning to return to broadcasting.

Taylor did voiceovers for over 25 movies for Columbia Pictures from 1935 to 1936. He was a daily columnist for Paul Block Syndicate and other independent papers, including the London Daily Star. He founded the Voice of Experience Foundation at Babies Hospital of the Columbia Presbyterian group of hospitals in New York City. He was president of the Hygienic Orificial Co., Inc, in Chicago, Illinois.

Taylor authored a number of books on sexual hygiene, including the following titles:

- Pre-determination of Sex and Natural Birth Control
- How To Know Your Affinity
- Sex Vigor for Men: How Retained, How Regained
- Facts for Wives
- Social Diseases: A National Menace
- The Story of Life and How to Tell It to Children
- Sex Knowledge for Children
- The Secret of Youth and Charm: Plain Sex Truths for Women
- The Lindsey-Taylor Debate on Marriage
- The Male Motor (1927)
- Voice of Experience (1933)
- Notebook of Intimate Problems (1934)
- Stranger Than Fiction (1934)
- Life Must Go On (1934)
- Making Molehills of Mountains (1935)
- A Million Private Lives (1935)
- Black Sheep (1941)

== Personal life ==
Taylor married Pauline. He married Jessie W. and later divorced in 1935. He later married Mildred. He had two daughters, Nancy Lucille and Julie Anne. He lived on Alpine Drive in Beverly Hills, California.

Taylor died of a heart attack on February 1, 1942, at the Hollywood Receiving Hospital in Hollywood, Los Angeles. He was buried in Forest Lawn Memorial Park in Glendale, California.

== Awards ==
Taylor was the commencement speaker of William Jewell College in 1935 and received an honorary Doctor of Laws degree. In 1935, he received a doctorate in humanities from Pacific University.
