= WHSQ =

ESPN Radio station in New York City

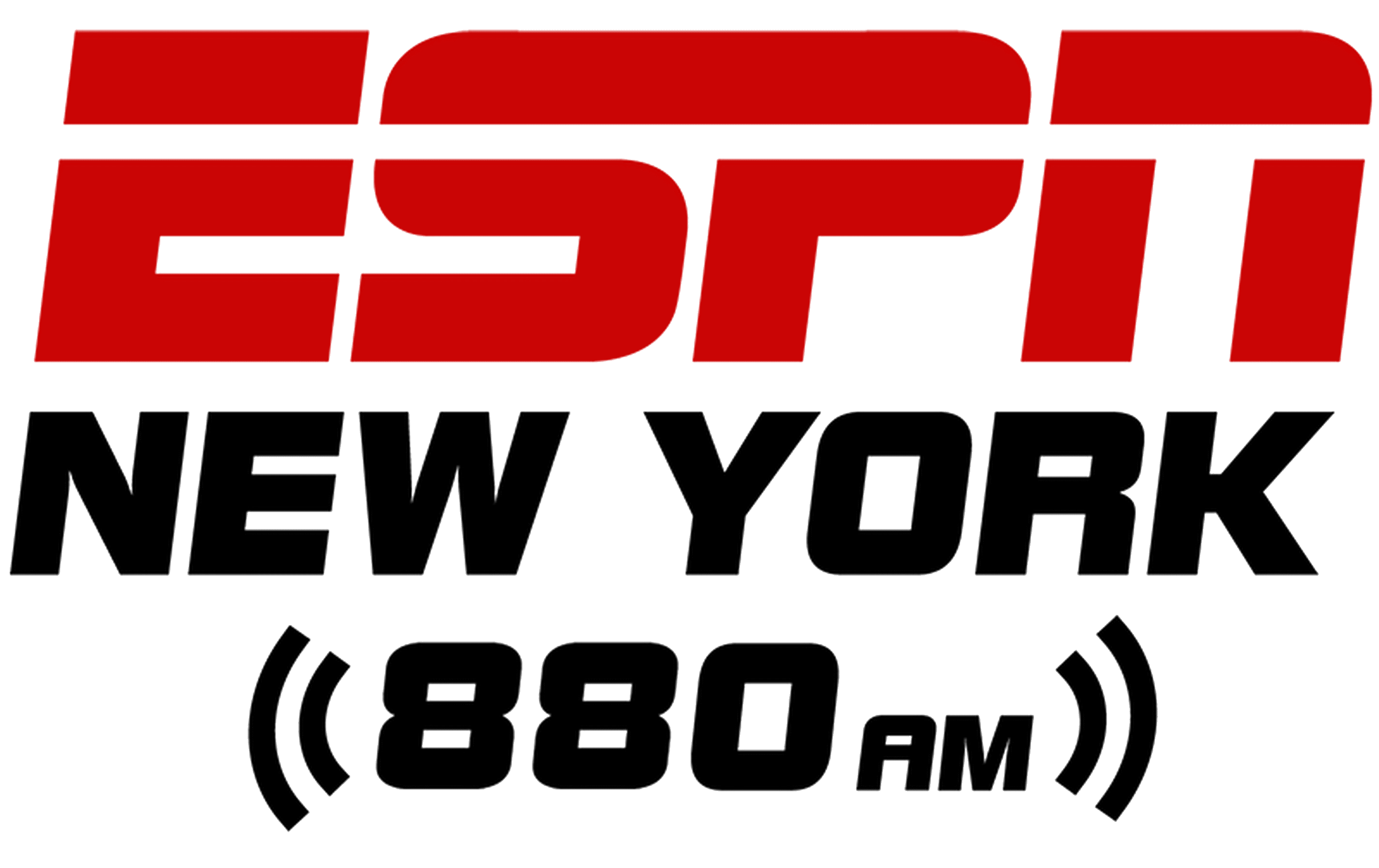
- New York, New York; United States
- Broadcast area: New York metropolitan area
- Frequency: 880 kHz
- Branding: ESPN New York 880 AM; Mets Radio 880 AM (alternate)

Programming
- Language: English
- Format: Sports radio
- Network: ESPN Radio
- Affiliations: New York Mets; MSG Radio Network (New York Knicks and New York Rangers games only)

Ownership
- Owner: Audacy, Inc.; (Audacy License, LLC)
- Operator: Good Karma Sports (under LMA)
- Sister stations: through Audacy: WCBS-FM; WFAN; WFAN-FM; WINS; WINS-FM; WNEW-FM; WXBK; through Good Karma: WEPN

History
- First air date: September 22, 1924
- Former call signs: WAHG (1924–1926); WABC (1926–1928); WABC-WBOQ (1928–1940); WABC (1940–1946); WCBS (1946–2024)
- Former frequencies: 950 kHz (1924–1927); 970 kHz (1927–1928); 860 kHz (1928–1941)
- Call sign meaning: Hudson Square

Technical information
- Licensing authority: FCC
- Facility ID: 9636
- Class: A (clear-channel station)
- Power: 50,000 watts (unlimited)
- Transmitter coordinates: 40°51′35.36″N 73°47′7.48″W (main); 40°51′34.4″N 73°47′11.5″W (aux)
- Repeater: 101.1 WCBS-FM-HD2 (New York)

Links
- Public license information: Public file; LMS
- Webcast: Listen live; Listen live (via Audacy); Listen live (via iHeartRadio)
- Website: goodkarmabrands.com/espn-new-york/

WHSQ (880 kHz, "ESPN New York 880") is an AM radio station licensed to serve New York City, owned by Audacy, Inc. The station is operated by Good Karma Sports (GKS) under a local marketing agreement (LMA). It broadcasts a sports radio format as the co-flagship of the ESPN Radio network. WHSQ's transmitter is located on High Island in the Bronx; its 50,000-watt clear channel signal can be heard at night throughout much of the eastern United States and Canada.

The station first signed on in September 1924 as Alfred H. Grebe's WAHG, becoming WABC in 1926. It was an affiliate and owned-and-operated flagship of the CBS Radio Network for much of its existence, and held the call letters WCBS from 1946 to 2024. In 1967, the station began an all-news format, competing primarily with WINS (1010 AM). WCBS later became a sister to WINS after CBS's merger with Westinghouse Broadcasting; the two stations were differentiated in their style and extent of coverage. In 2017, CBS Radio merged with Entercom (now Audacy), ending the ownership of WCBS by CBS.

In 2022, WCBS began to combine its operations with WINS. In August 2024, Audacy announced that it would end WCBS's all-news format after 57 years, and enter into an LMA with Good Karma to operate the station under a sports format; in particular, it subsumed the programming of WEPN-FM, due to the expiration of GKB's LMA for the station with Emmis Communications.

== Programming ==
WHSQ carries a mix of local and ESPN Radio national programming, The station is the flagship of the New York Mets Radio Network, as the rights are owned by Audacy rather than Good Karma, they are not part of the LMA and the station's advertising is sold by Audacy during Mets broadcasts. Likewise, the station is promoted by Audacy as Mets Radio 880, and its associated stream on the Audacy app otherwise carries Westwood One Sports programming outside of Mets games.

== History ==
=== Alfred H. Grebe ===
The station was first licensed, as WAHG, on September 20, 1924, to Alfred H. Grebe & Company, for 500 watts on 950 kHz. It made its debut broadcast on the evening of September 22. WAHG was a pioneering station in New York, and was one of the first commercial radio stations to broadcast from remote locations including horse races and yachting events.

In December 1926, WABC, a station located in Asheville, North Carolina, changed its call sign to WWNC. Grebe took advantage of this to modify his station's call sign to one that reflected a change in ownership to the Atlantic Broadcasting Company, and it was announced that on December 17 "the new super power 5 kW station WABC, formerly WAHG, took to the air... from 113 West 57th St." debuting with a "gala concert".

On March 26, 1925, a second station, WBOQ, standing for "Borough of Queens", had been licensed to A. H. Grebe & Company on 1270 kHz. Grebe's Atlantic Broadcasting Company eventually was licensed for four New York City-area stations: WABC, WBOQ, plus portable stations WGMU and WRMU. The two portable stations were deleted on July 31, 1928, after the recently formed Federal Radio Commission (FRC) decided that movable stations were too difficult to regulate. On November 11, 1928, WABC and WBOQ were formally consolidated as WABC-WBOQ, and the FRC's General Order 40 moved the combined operation to a "clear channel" frequency of 860 kHz. WABC-WBOQ became a part-time network affiliate of the Columbia Broadcasting System (CBS), which wanted a full-time radio presence in New York City. CBS programming had earlier been heard on WOR also on a part time basis. WOR remained independent for a few years, then helped form the Mutual Broadcasting System.

=== CBS ownership ===
After a short time broadcasting CBS programming three days a week, WABC-WBOQ was purchased by CBS president William S. Paley, and became a full-time CBS Network owned and operated station. WABC-WBOQ increased its transmitting power from 5,000 to its present 50,000 watts, the maximum permitted by the FCC. Studios also moved into the CBS headquarters at 485 Madison Avenue, on the corner of 52nd Street.

The station featured a mix of local interest programming along with dramas, comedies, news, sports, and music programs from CBS's national feed. As time went by, WABC turned more and more to the national programming provided by CBS and its affiliates, and its broadcast day was influenced by CBS's growing interest in news programming. In 1939, the broadcasting operations were moved across 52nd Street from the headquarters to the new CBS Studio Building.

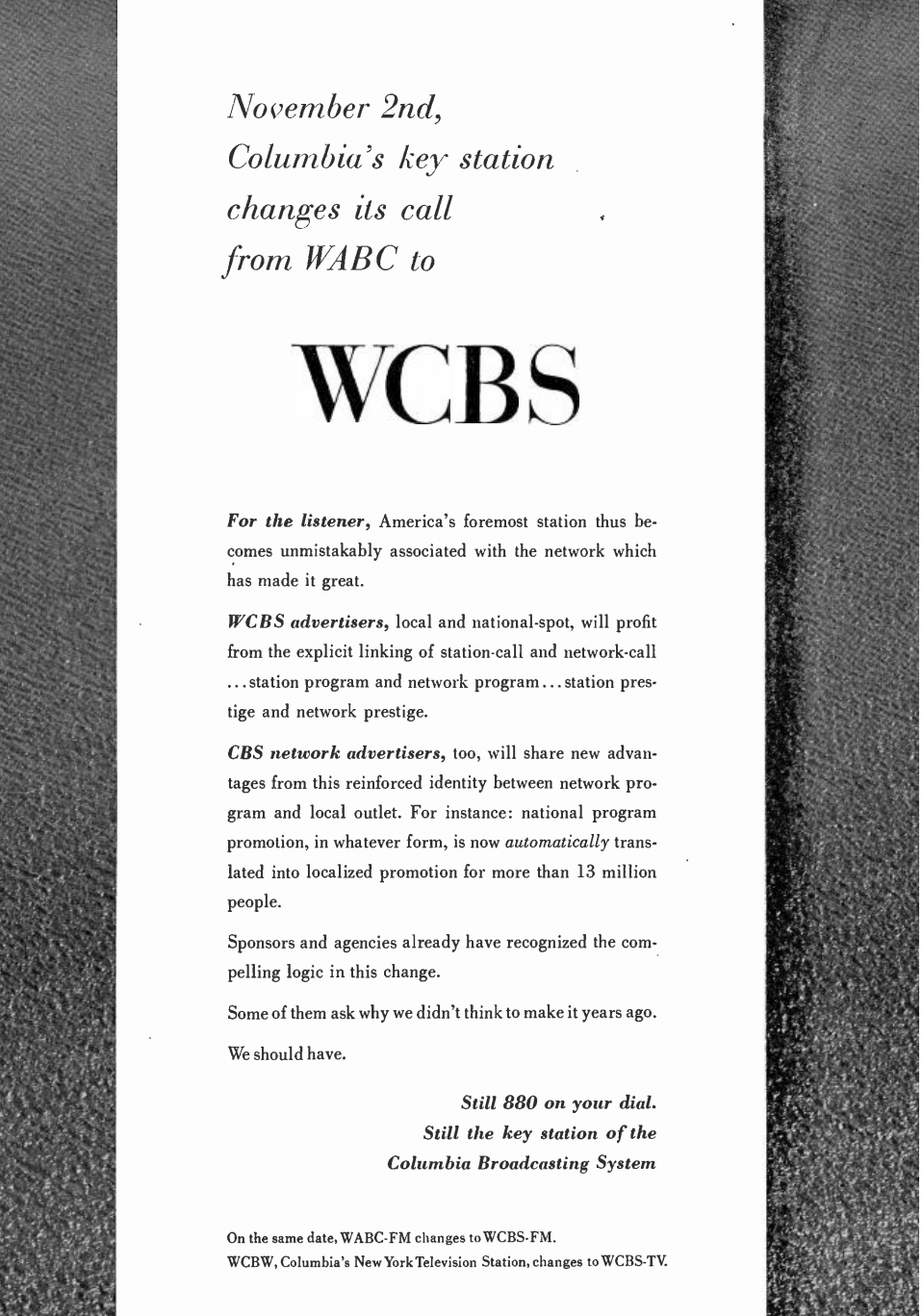
On November 2, 1946, the call sign was changed from WABC to WCBS, to differentiate the station from the recently formed American Broadcasting Company, and more closely identify it as Columbia Broadcasting System's primary outlet.

=== New frequency and call sign ===
On June 15, 1940, the generally unused WBOQ call sign was eliminated from the station's dual call signs, and it became just WABC. In 1941, due to the implementation of the North American Regional Broadcasting Agreement (NARBA), the station moved to 880 kHz.

On September 8, 1946, the call sign of a station in Springfield, Illinois, was changed from WCBS to WCVS. This allowed WABC in New York to change to WCBS on November 2, 1946, to identify more closely with its parent network, the Columbia Broadcasting System (CBS). It also helped avoid confusion with the rival network of the American Broadcasting Company (ABC), which began operation under that name in 1945. Control of the call sign WABC was retained by renaming a relay station from WEHG to WABC. Longtime, and unrelated, ABC radio flagship station on 770 kHz in New York was assigned the call sign WABC in 1953, after operating since its beginning in 1921 as WJZ.

Over the next 20 years, WCBS developed a series of radio soap operas, afternoon talk shows, and an all-night easy listening music show, Music 'til Dawn. It was hosted by Bob Hall and sponsored by American Airlines. During this time, WCBS featured well-known personalities including Arthur Godfrey, future CBS News President Bill Leonard, author Emily Kimbrough, and folk singer Oscar Brand.

=== Fear on Trial controversy ===
In the 1950s, one of the stations daytime hosts, John Henry Faulk, was part of an anti-blacklisting wing (including CBS newsman Charles Collingwood) that assumed leadership of the flagship New York chapter of the American Federation of Television and Radio Artists (AFTRA) broadcasters' union.

After Faulk and WCBS came under pressure from anti-Communist group Aware, Inc., Faulk and attorney Louis Nizer sued Aware, Inc. for libel, a case often considered one of the key turning points in the battle against McCarthyism. Faulk was supported by fellow CBS broadcaster Edward R. Murrow, who was tipped off to Faulk's plight by Carl Sandburg. According to Murrow biographer Joe Persico, Murrow gave Faulk the money he needed to retain Nizer as his lawyer. Faulk finally won the case in 1963, in the meantime becoming a popular radio personality in his native Texas, and later, a national television personality as a regular in the cast of the country music/humor variety show Hee Haw.

WCBS fired Faulk because of declining ratings while he waited for the case to come to trial. Stanley Cloud and Lynne Olson's book The Murrow Boys asserted that WCBS executive Arthur Hull Hayes admitted on the stand the station's overall ratings, not Faulk's specifically, had slipped.

The controversy became the subject of the 1975 CBS television movie Fear on Trial, based in part on Faulk's autobiography of the same name.

=== Adoption of news format ===
By the late 1950s and early 1960s, WCBS evolved into a middle of the road (MOR) music and personality format, which included limited talk programming. Personalities included morning host Jack Sterling, Bill Randle, and Lee Jordan. Like many MOR stations at the time, WCBS mixed in softer songs by rock-and-roll artists. Its ratings at the time were ordinary compared to the higher ratings at WOR and WNEW, both of which also had MOR formats and more distinct identities. Through it all, the variety show Arthur Godfrey Time remained a weekday mid-morning staple. Eventually, WCBS gained a foothold in local news coverage (WOR and WNEW's strengths), bolstered by its standing as CBS's flagship radio station.

During the 1960s, CBS chairman William S. Paley, concerned about the station's low ratings, started a process that led to the creation of a news radio format that would become known as "Newsradio 88". Paley hired Clark B. George, then vice-president and general manager of WCBS-TV, to create the new format and turn the station's low ratings around. The format debuted on August 28, 1967 – although on WCBS-FM, because a small airplane had crashed into and destroyed WCBS's AM antenna tower just a few hours earlier. Its original roster of anchors included Charles Osgood, Ed Bradley, Robert Vaughn and Pat Summerall. Later anchors included veteran newscaster Lou Adler, Jim Donnelly, Harvey Hauptman, Bill Lynch, and Gary Maurer.

Initially, the station ran news only during drive time periods, and maintained an MOR format during midday and overnight hours. Within a couple of years, it expanded all-news programming to much of the broadcast day, still excepting overnights. "Newsradio 88" began its transformation into an all-news format in 1970, when the overnight American Airlines-sponsored Music Till Dawn ended in January of that year, and completed the process in 1972, when Godfrey's weekday morning variety show came to an end. The station built a reputation as an all-news powerhouse during the 1970s, and continued with an all-news format until August 2024.

Although WINS usually received the higher Arbitron ratings of the two all-news stations, WCBS typically had the better ratings in the suburbs because of its stronger, non-directional signal, unlike WINS's directional pattern. Its traffic reports and news coverage included more of Long Island and Westchester County than WINS did, and it occasionally allowed room for longer interviews and analysis pieces than WINS. The station was less tightly formatted than WINS, and formatted at half-hour cycles instead of 20-minute cycles. Also unlike WINS, WCBS did not change anchors every thirty minutes during its daily schedule. Instead, each solo anchor or anchor team on weekdays had a set shift from 5 a.m. until 8 p.m., with two anchors switching every one or two hours after that. On weekends, anchors also alternated every hour.

=== Adding other all-news stations ===
WCBS's switch to all-news was the first move in CBS Radio's long-term plans to convert its group of AM stations to some form of news programming. Along with WCBS, the group was then composed of KNX in Los Angeles, WBBM in Chicago, WCAU in Philadelphia, KMOX in St. Louis, WEEI in Boston, and KCBS in San Francisco. Once WCBS had been established in the format, CBS began to work on the rest of its AM outlets. KCBS, KNX, and WBBM all transitioned in 1968. WEEI adopted an all-news format in 1974, and WCAU made the switch a year later. The programming shift was a gradual one just as it had been at WCBS, with the stations running all-news most of the day while some local and network non-news programming remained at first. KMOX, which had been programming a talk radio format for several years was left unaffected, though it later changed into a news/talk station.

In Boston, Chicago, and San Francisco, CBS-owned stations had a monopoly on the all-news format. In New York, Los Angeles, and Philadelphia, CBS had to compete with Westinghouse-owned stations, WINS, KFWB, and KYW, respectively. They had adopted all-news programming before the CBS stations did. While the Los Angeles stations made the switch within days of each other, WCAU in Philadelphia did not switch to the format until 1975, giving KYW a ten-year head start with the audience. Many blame this as the primary reason WCAU did not succeed in competing with KYW. The all-news format on WCAU lasted only three years. In contrast, the other CBS all-news stations experienced success and stability with the format. In 1995, Westinghouse merged with CBS, making WCBS a sister station to its longtime archrival WINS.

Logo for WCBS Newsradio 880 introduced from 2005-2018

In October 2000, WCBS made another move, from CBS corporate headquarters at 51 West 52nd Street (the building known as "Black Rock") to the CBS Broadcast Center at 524 West 57th Street. Around this time, the station began referring to itself as "Newsradio 880". On December 2, 2011, the station moved operations to 345 Hudson Street, known as the Hudson Square Broadcast Center, sharing space with CBS Radio's other New York stations.

=== Entercom/Audacy ownership ===
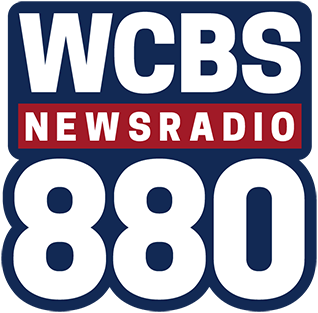
Final WCBS Newsradio 880 Logo used from 2018-2024

On February 2, 2017, CBS agreed to merge CBS Radio with Entercom, at the time the fourth-largest radio broadcaster in the United States; the sale was conducted using a Reverse Morris Trust so that it would be tax-free. While CBS shareholders retained a 72% ownership stake in the combined company, Entercom was the surviving entity, separating WCBS radio (both 880 and FM 101.1) from WCBS-TV. The merger was approved on November 9, 2017, and was consummated on November 17. As part of the agreement with CBS, Entercom was given the rights to use the brand and trademarks for WCBS along with sister stations WCBS-FM, KCBS (AM) in San Francisco, and KCBS-FM in Los Angeles for a 20-year period after which Entercom (or succeeding entity) would be required to relinquish using those call-letters.

Before the merger with Entercom, CBS Radio operated nine of the country's largest all-news radio stations: WCBS, WINS, KNX, WBBM, KYW, KCBS, WBZ in Boston, WWJ in Detroit, and KRLD in Dallas. (As part of the Entercom transaction, and to gain regulatory approval of it, WBZ, along with several other Entercom stations, were sold to iHeartMedia effective December 19, 2017.)

On October 10, 2022, after Audacy had reached a new deal with SAG-AFTRA, it was announced that the separate staffs and newsrooms of WCBS and WINS would be combined. Concurrently, WNYL (92.3 FM) also became an FM simulcast of WINS. The move gave WINS an FM outlet, while WCBS remained only on AM radio and on an HD Radio digital subchannel of 101.1 WCBS-FM.

=== End of all-news format, start of LMA with Good Karma Brands ===
Since WINS added its FM signal, WINS had seen increases in listeners (especially among young adults) and revenue at the expense of WCBS. In 2022, before the addition of WINS-FM, the two stations were neck-and-neck in revenue earnings, with WCBS earning $30.9 million to WINS' $31.6 million. Following the addition, WCBS' competitive standing plummeted, earning just $29.7 million in 2023 versus WINS-AM/FM's $40 million. By 2024, it had become clear the move was draining listeners from WCBS, with the station seeing a new low in the Nielsen Audio market ratings with just a 1.5 in the June 2024 books, a cumulative total of 679,400 people (significantly behind WINS' 1,538,800), and the station ranking 24th place in the 25-54 demographic ratings, far behind WINS' ranking of 11th place (and a steep drop from 2022, when WCBS ranked 18th, just one spot behind WINS).

On August 12, 2024, Audacy announced that it would end the all-news format on WCBS effective August 26, citing that "the headwinds facing local journalism nationwide made it essential to strategically reimagine how we deliver the news for the most impact", and that it would therefore focus exclusively on WINS moving forward. Audacy entered into a local marketing agreement (LMA) with Good Karma Brands (now Good Karma Sports as of August 2026), under which the ESPN Radio programming of WEPN-FM would move to WCBS, and the station would change its call letters to WHSQ. Good Karma had been operating WEPN-FM under an LMA with its owner Emmis Communications, and did not plan to renew its contract when it expired at the end of August 2024.

The station produced a three-hour retrospective special, WCBS 880 News: The People, the Moments, and the Events that Shaped our Lives, highlighting the history of WCBS and featuring appearances by station alumni. The station formally ended its news format at midnight on August 26, 2024, preceded by a playing of "Imagine" by John Lennon and sign off by morning news anchor Wayne Cabot.

Alongside ESPN Radio programming, WHSQ retained its rights to the New York Mets, as they are owned by Audacy. The rights to Rutgers Scarlet Knights basketball were transferred to WFAN.

== WCBS programming ==
=== Time announcement ===
From 1924 until the end of its all-news programming in 2024, WCBS was known for announcing the time every three minutes. This is because during the early 20th century, not all listeners had reliable time pieces. They relied on synchronising their clocks up with the radio almost every day. On the hour, WCBS played the distinctive CBS network "bong" indicating that the time is on the hour, although the station would later broadcast with a 10-second delay. The time was distinctly introduced with "WCBS news time: _:__". This standard practice, with slight variations, is also used at other CBS-affiliated news radio stations nationwide.

=== "Traffic and Weather Together" ===
As an all-news station, WCBS promoted its pairing of traffic and weather reports every ten minutes "on the eights", and used the tagline "Traffic and Weather Together". The station's chief meteorologist, Craig Allen, and its rush hour traffic reporter Tom Kaminski, were both with WCBS for over three decades and recorded a series of commercials together to that effect. Part-time WCBS meteorologist Todd Glickman, who filled in for Allen, was with the station from 1979 until 2024, when the station ended all-news programming.

WCBS's promotional work was the inspiration for the title of the Fountains of Wayne album Traffic and Weather, according to an interview the New Jersey–based band gave to the station.

=== Sports ===
In 2019, WCBS became the flagship station for Major League Baseball's New York Mets, succeeding WOR. For several years prior, WCBS had served as the primary overflow outlet for sister station WFAN (AM) and WFAN-FM's coverage of the NFL's New York Giants, the National Basketball Association's Brooklyn Nets, and the National Hockey League's New Jersey Devils. When the Mets moved to WCBS, Entercom allowed WFAN to split its AM and FM feeds to accommodate such conflicts—WFAN also broadcasts New York Yankees baseball, which it acquired from WCBS in 2014. The station continued continuous news coverage on its web feed when sports events could not be streamed due to NFL and NBA restrictions. (MLB allowed its local radio partners to stream games once again in 2019 after several years of exclusivity via MLB.com. There are no NHL radio blackouts.) In 2022, the WCBS Audacy stream began to carry Mets broadcasts within the team's broadcast territory. Later that year, the station became the flagship for Rutgers Scarlet Knights men's basketball, replacing longtime home WOR.

WCBS served three stints as the radio flagship of the Yankees, with the most recent running from 2002 until 2013. The station had previously carried the Yankees from 1939 to 1940 when it was known as WABC; and from 1960 to 1966, a period that included a time in which the team was owned by CBS Inc., which purchased a majority interest in the Yankees in 1964. The broadcaster sold the club to a group led by George Steinbrenner in 1973.

Until WFAN began broadcasting its all-sports format in 1987, WCBS was the primary outlet for CBS Radio Network coverage of professional sports events, including Major League Baseball and the National Football League. It also served as the flagship commercial station for St. John's University basketball games during the Johnnies' renaissance in the 1980s and 1990s. WCBS also served two tenures as the flagship station of the New York Jets. In its pre-all-news days, WCBS also carried the baseball Giants (as part of the 1930s-40s Giants-Yankees home game package), the football Giants, and the NBA's New York Knicks. In 2016, the New York Islanders moved their flagship station to WCBS for that year's playoffs, with WFAN airing select games when available; the Islanders had, up to that point, resorted to airing on noncommercial WNYE, which had limited the team's ability to earn money from the broadcasts.

WCBS served as a springboard to athletes-turned-broadcasters in its pre-all-news period. Most notably, former football Giants Pat Summerall and Frank Gifford were employed in various capacities by WCBS and the CBS Radio Network late in their playing days. Sports announcer Marty Glickman served as sports director during a time in the 1960s.

Mel Allen was originally renowned as an all-purpose broadcaster on WCBS and the CBS Radio Network before and during his tenure as the Yankees' lead broadcaster. Decades later, Ed Ingles established a 25-year career as sports director and morning sports anchor at WCBS, reporter for the Jets and St. John's broadcasts, and mentor to several veteran local and national broadcasters such as Barry Landers, Bill Schweizer, Spencer Ross and Bill Daughtry.

In 2023, WCBS aired Sunday afternoon NFL games from Compass Media Networks. The station also carried Notre Dame Fighting Irish football broadcasts, distributed by Skyview Networks.

== See also ==
- WCBS-FM (101.1 MHz)
- WCBS-TV (channel 2)
