= NFC =

NFC commonly refers to:

- Near-field communication, a set of communication protocols for electronic devices
- National Football Conference, a part of the National Football League

NFC may also refer to:

== Psychology ==
- Need for closure, a social psychological term
- Need for cognition, in psychology

== Sports ==
- National football centre, a soccer centre in several countries
- NCAA Football Championship (Philippines)
- Newcastle F.C., a Northern Irish football team
- Newington F.C., a Northern Irish football team
- Newtownbreda F.C., a Northern Irish football team
- Newtowne F.C., a Northern Irish football team
- NFC Championship Game, the National Football Conference Championship Game
- Northeast Football Conference, a junior college football conference

== Organizations ==
- Bulgarian National Film Center, or National Film Center, the funding and advocacy body for the film industry in Bulgaria
- National Fertilizer Corporation, a state-owned enterprise in Pakistan
- National Finance Center, of the U.S. Department of Agriculture
- National Finance Commission Award, a series of economic reforms in Pakistan
- Nuclear Fuel Complex, a division of the Department of Atomic Energy in India

== Other uses ==
- New Friends Colony, a residential neighborhood in India
- News First Class, a news website
- No Fem el CIM, a Catalan social movement
- Normalization Form Canonical Composition, one of the forms of Unicode normalization
- Norwegian Forest Cat, a breed of domestic cat
