= La Palina =

American cigar brand

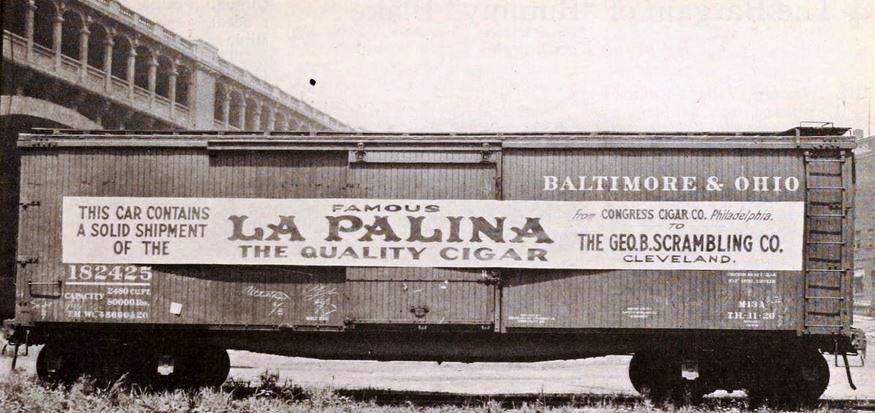
La Palina cigars fill a Baltimore and Ohio Railroad car

La Palina is an American cigar brand that holds historical significance in the realms of radio and advertising. The brand received sponsorship from the Congress Cigar Company, which was under the ownership of Sam Paley, the father of CBS founder William S. Paley. La Palina gained a notable association with Kate Smith's initial CBS radio network program titled "Kate Smith and Her Swanee Music". In recent times, William C. Paley, the grandson of Sam Paley, has reclaimed the rights to the La Palina name and currently produces La Palina cigars once again.

Within the context of La Palina cigar boxes, the interior and exterior images featured Goldie Drell Paley, Sam Paley's wife, dressed in a Spanish costume. The name "La Palina" originated from "the female Paley" and was chosen to reflect the portrait used in the product's marketing.
