= List of New York Rangers broadcasters =

The following are the broadcasters on TV and radio who have worked for the New York Rangers.

== Television ==
=== 2020s ===
Year	Channel	Play-by-play	Color commentator(s)	Rinkside reporter	Studio host	Studio analyst(s)
2025–26	MSG Network	Kenny Albert (primary); Alex Faust (select games during Albert's absences); John Giannone (select games during Albert's and Faust's absences)	Dave Maloney (primary); Brian Boyle (select games)	Michelle Gingras	John Giannone	Steve Valiquette and Henrik Lundqvist
2024–25	MSG Network	Sam Rosen (primary); Kenny Albert (select games during Rosen's absences); John Giannone (select games during Rosen's absences)	Joe Micheletti (primary); Dave Maloney (select games)	Michelle Gingras	John Giannone	Steve Valiquette and Henrik Lundqvist
2023–24	MSG Network	Sam Rosen (primary); Kenny Albert (select games during Rosen's absences); John Giannone (select games during Rosen's absences)	Joe Micheletti (primary); Dave Maloney (select games)	Michelle Gingras	John Giannone	Steve Valiquette and Henrik Lundqvist
2022–23	MSG Network	Sam Rosen (primary); Kenny Albert (select games during Rosen's absences); John Giannone (select games during Rosen's absences)	Joe Micheletti (primary); Dave Maloney (select games)	Michelle Gingras	John Giannone	Steve Valiquette and Henrik Lundqvist
2021–22	MSG Network	Sam Rosen (primary); Kenny Albert (select games during Rosen's absences); John Giannone (select games during Rosen's absences)	Joe Micheletti (primary); Dave Maloney (select games)	Michelle Gingras	John Giannone	Steve Valiquette and Henrik Lundqvist
2021	MSG Network	Sam Rosen (primary); Kenny Albert (select games during Rosen's absences); John Giannone (select games during Rosen's absences)	Joe Micheletti (primary); Dave Maloney (select games)	John Giannone	John Giannone or Al Trautwig	Steve Valiquette

=== 2010s ===
Year	Channel	Play-by-play	Color commentator(s)	Rinkside reporter	Studio host	Studio analyst(s)
2019–20	MSG Network	Sam Rosen (primary); Kenny Albert (select games during Rosen's absences); John Giannone (select games during Rosen's absences)	Joe Micheletti (primary); Dave Maloney (select games)	John Giannone	Al Trautwig	Steve Valiquette
2018–19	MSG Network	Sam Rosen (primary); John Giannone (during Rosen's Fox NFL assignments)	Joe Micheletti	John Giannone	Al Trautwig	Steve Valiquette
2017–18	MSG Network	Sam Rosen (primary); John Giannone (during Rosen's Fox NFL assignments)	Joe Micheletti	John Giannone	Al Trautwig	Steve Valiquette
2016–17	MSG Network	Sam Rosen (primary); John Giannone (during Rosen's Fox NFL assignments)	Joe Micheletti	John Giannone	Al Trautwig	
2015–16	MSG Network	Sam Rosen (primary); John Giannone (during Rosen's Fox NFL assignments)	Joe Micheletti	John Giannone	Al Trautwig	
2014–15	MSG Network	Sam Rosen (primary); John Giannone (during Rosen's Fox NFL assignments)	Joe Micheletti (primary); Dave Maloney (select games)	John Giannone	Al Trautwig	
2013–14	MSG Network	Sam Rosen (primary); John Giannone (during Rosen's Fox NFL assignments)	Joe Micheletti	John Giannone	Al Trautwig	
2013	MSG Network	Sam Rosen (primary); John Giannone (during Rosen's Fox NFL assignments)	Joe Micheletti	John Giannone	Al Trautwig	
2011–12	MSG Network	Sam Rosen (primary); John Giannone (during Rosen's Fox NFL assignments)	Joe Micheletti	John Giannone	Al Trautwig	
2010–11	MSG Network	Sam Rosen (primary); John Giannone (during Rosen's Fox NFL assignments)	Joe Micheletti	John Giannone Rob Simpson (When Giannone did pbp)	Al Trautwig	

=== 2000s ===
Year	Channel	Play-by-play	Color commentator(s)	Rinkside reporter	Studio host	Studio analyst(s)
2009–10	MSG Network	Sam Rosen (primary); John Giannone (during Rosen's Fox NFL assignments)	Joe Micheletti	John Giannone	Al Trautwig	Ron Duguay, Stan Fischler, Mike Keenan, and Dave Maloney
2008–09	MSG Network	Sam Rosen (primary); John Giannone (during Rosen's Fox NFL assignments)	Joe Micheletti	John Giannone	Al Trautwig	
2007–08	MSG Network	Sam Rosen (primary); John Giannone (during Rosen's Fox NFL assignments)	Joe Micheletti	John Giannone	Al Trautwig	
2006–07	MSG Network	Sam Rosen (primary); Mike Crispino (select games during Rosen's Fox NFL assignments); John Giannone (select games during Rosen's Fox NFL assignments); Bob Wischusen (select games during Rosen's Fox NFL assignments)	Joe Micheletti (primary); Dave Maloney (during Micheletti's NHL on NBC assignments)	John Giannone	Al Trautwig	
2005–06	MSG Network	Sam Rosen (primary); Mike Crispino (select games during Rosen's Fox NFL assignments); John Giannone (select games during Rosen's Fox NFL assignments)	John Davidson (primary); Dave Maloney (during Davidson's NHL on NBC assignments)	John Giannone	Al Trautwig	
2003–04	MSG Network	Sam Rosen	John Davidson (primary); Sal Messina (during Davidson's NHL on ABC assignments)		Al Trautwig	
2002–03	MSG Network	Sam Rosen	John Davidson (primary); Sal Messina (during Davidson's NHL on ABC assignments)		Al Trautwig	
2001–02	MSG Network	Sam Rosen	John Davidson (primary); Sal Messina (during Davidson's NHL on ABC assignments)		Al Trautwig	
2000–01	MSG Network	Sam Rosen	John Davidson (primary); Sal Messina (during Davidson's NHL on ABC assignments)		Al Trautwig	

For the first two games of the 2008–09 season, in Prague, WEPN carried a simulcast of MSG audio with Sam Rosen and Joe Micheletti in Prague, and Don La Greca and Pete Stemkowski in the New York studio for intermissions.

=== 1990s ===
Year	Channel	Play-by-play	Color commentator(s)	Studio host
1999–2000	MSG Network	Sam Rosen	John Davidson (primary); Sal Messina (during Davidson's NHL on ABC assignments)	Al Trautwig
1998–99	MSG Network	Sam Rosen	John Davidson (primary); Sal Messina (during Davidson's NHL on Fox assignments)	Al Trautwig
1997–98	MSG Network	Sam Rosen	John Davidson (primary); Sal Messina (during Davidson's NHL on Fox assignments)	Al Trautwig
1996–97	MSG Network	Sam Rosen	John Davidson (primary); Sal Messina (during Davidson's NHL on Fox assignments)	Al Trautwig
1995–96	MSG Network	Sam Rosen	John Davidson	Al Trautwig
1995	MSG Network	Sam Rosen	John Davidson	Al Trautwig
1993–94	MSG Network (main)	Sam Rosen	John Davidson	Al Trautwig
1993–94	MSG II (alternate)	Sam Rosen	John Davidson	Al Trautwig
1992–93	MSG Network	Sam Rosen	John Davidson	Al Trautwig
1991–92	MSG Network	Sam Rosen	John Davidson	Bruce Beck
1990–91	MSG Network	Sam Rosen	John Davidson	Bruce Beck

=== 1980s ===
Year	Channel	Play-by-play	Color commentator(s)	Studio host	Studio analyst(s)
1989–90	MSG Network	Sam Rosen	John Davidson	Bruce Beck	
1988–89	MSG Network	Sam Rosen	John Davidson	Bruce Beck	
1988–89	WWOR-TV	Sam Rosen	John Davidson	Bruce Beck	
1987–88	MSG Network	Sam Rosen	John Davidson	Bruce Beck	
1987–88	WWOR-TV	Sam Rosen	John Davidson	Bruce Beck	
1986–87	MSG Network	Sam Rosen	John Davidson	Bruce Beck	
1986–87	WOR-TV	Sam Rosen	John Davidson	Bruce Beck	
1985–86	MSG Network	Sam Rosen	Phil Esposito	Bruce Beck	
1985–86	WOR-TV	Sam Rosen	Phil Esposito	Bruce Beck	
1984–85	MSG Network	Sam Rosen	Phil Esposito	Bruce Beck	
1984–85	WOR-TV	Sam Rosen	Phil Esposito	Bruce Beck	
1983–84	MSG Network	Jim Gordon	Phil Esposito	Bruce Beck or Sam Rosen	John Davidson
1983–84	WOR-TV	Jim Gordon	Phil Esposito	Bruce Beck or Sam Rosen	John Davidson
1982–83	MSG Network	Jim Gordon	Phil Esposito	Bruce Beck or Sam Rosen	Mike Eruzione
1982–83	WOR-TV	Jim Gordon	Phil Esposito	Bruce Beck or Sam Rosen	Mike Eruzione
1981–82	MSG Network	Jim Gordon	Phil Esposito	Sam Rosen	Mike Eruzione
1981–82	WOR-TV	Jim Gordon	Phil Esposito	Sam Rosen	Mike Eruzione
1980–81	MSG Network	Jim Gordon	Bill Chadwick		
1980–81	WOR-TV	Jim Gordon	Bill Chadwick		

=== 1970s ===
Year	Channel	Play-by-play	Color commentator(s)
1979–80	MSG Network	Jim Gordon	Bill Chadwick
1979–80	WOR-TV	Jim Gordon	Bill Chadwick
1978–79	MSG Network	Jim Gordon	Bill Chadwick
1978–79	WOR-TV	Jim Gordon	Bill Chadwick
1977–78	MSG Network	Jim Gordon	Bill Chadwick
1977–78	WOR-TV	Jim Gordon	Bill Chadwick
1976–77	MSG Network	Jim Gordon	Bill Chadwick
1976–77	WOR-TV	Jim Gordon	Bill Chadwick
1975–76	MSG Network	Jim Gordon	Bill Chadwick
1975–76	WOR-TV	Jim Gordon	Bill Chadwick
1974–75	MSG Network	Jim Gordon	Bill Chadwick
1974–75	WOR-TV	Jim Gordon	Bill Chadwick
1973–74	MSG Network	Jim Gordon	Bill Chadwick and Bob Wolff
1973–74	WOR-TV	Jim Gordon	Bill Chadwick and Bob Wolff
1972–73	MSG Network	Sal Marchiano	Bill Chadwick and Bob Wolff
1972–73	WOR-TV	Sal Marchiano	Bill Chadwick and Bob Wolff
1971–72	MSG Network	Tim Ryan	Norman Mac Lean and Bob Wolff
1971–72	WOR-TV	Tim Ryan	Norman Mac Lean and Bob Wolff
1970–71	MSG Network	Tim Ryan	Bill Mazer and Bob Wolff
1970–71	WOR-TV	Tim Ryan	Bill Mazer and Bob Wolff

HBO's first sports broadcast was of a New York Rangers-Vancouver Canucks NHL game, transmitted to a Service Electric cable system in Wilkes-Barre, Pennsylvania on November 8, 1972. From 1972 to 1974, HBO used only one announcer on Rangers games so Marty Glickman, who was in charge of HBO Sports, hired other announcers to replace him when he was unavailable, generally owing to his radio commitments to Giants football.

=== 1960s ===
Year	Channel	Play-by-play	Color commentator
1969–70	MSG Network	Jim Gordon	Bob Wolff
1969–70	WOR-TV	Jim Gordon	Bob Wolff
1968–69	WOR-TV	Jim Gordon	Bob Wolff
1967–68	WOR-TV	Jim Gordon	Bob Wolff
1966–67	WOR-TV	Jim Gordon	Bob Wolff
1965–66	WOR-TV	Norm Jary	Bob Wolff
1964–65	WPIX	Win Elliot	Bob Wolff
1963–64	WPIX	Win Elliot	Bob Wolff
1962–63	WPIX	Win Elliot	Bob Wolff

Win Eliot called the Rangers games on WPIX-11 as part of The Saturday Night Sports Special. In the early 1960s, the Rangers played Saturday afternoon games, which were tape delayed for evening re-broadcast on Channel 11. The Saturday night hockey games were almost always shown at 9 p.m. Road games were usually aired live if the Rangers were at Chicago, where the game was at 8:30 p.m., and after expansion, in St. Louis or Minnesota, where 9 p.m. would be the actual start time. In the 1964–65 season, Win Elliott did all the Saturday night games until March 20, which was the first Saturday of the racing season at Aqueduct, where Elliott hosted a Saturday afternoon series. Jim Gordon therefore, did the last two Saturday nights of the season. When the Rangers weren't scheduled on Saturday nights, Channel 11 would run events such as track and field and ECAC Basketball. This occurred from 1962 to 1965, before the Knicks and Rangers moved to Channel 9. They even showed a different NHL game on occasion, which was the case on March 27, 1965, when Jim Gordon went to Toronto to do a Detroit-Toronto game for WPIX.

=== 1950s ===
Year	Channel	Play-by-play	Color commentator
1957–58	WPIX	Bud Palmer	Bob Wolff
1956–57	WPIX	Win Elliot	Bud Palmer
1955–56	WPIX	Win Elliot	Bud Palmer
1954–55	WPIX	Win Elliot	Bud Palmer
1953–54	WPIX	Win Elliot	Bud Palmer
1952–53	WPIX	Win Elliot	
1951–52	WPIX	Win Elliot	
1950–51	WPIX	Win Elliot	

=== 1940s ===
Year	Channel	Play-by-play
1949–50	WPIX	Win Elliot
1948–49	WPIX	Win Elliot
1947–48	WCBS-TV	Win Elliot
1946–47	WCBW	Bob Edge
1945–46	WCBW	Bob Edge
1944-45	WNBT	Bob Stanton
1943-44	WNBT	Bob Stanton
1942-43	WNBT	Bob Stanton
1941-42	WNBT	Bob Stanton
1940-41	W2XBS	Bob Stanton
1939-40	W2XBS	Bob Stanton

The Rangers' home game against the Montreal Canadiens on February 25, 1940, was the first National Hockey League game to ever be broadcast on television.

== Radio ==
=== 2020s ===
Year	Channel	Play-by-play	Color commentator(s)	Studio host
2025–26	WHSQ	Alex Faust (primary); Alex Thomas (select games during Faust's MLB on TBS or Rangers on MSG TV assignments)	Dave Starman (primary); Pete Stemkowski (select games)	
2024–25	WHSQ	Kenny Albert (primary); Don La Greca (select games during Albert's NFL on Fox, TNT, Knicks on MSG, or Rangers on MSG TV assignments); Ed Cohen (select games during Albert's NFL on Fox, TNT, Knicks on MSG, or Rangers on MSG TV assignments); Sam Rosen (during select national broadcasts); Alex Faust (select games)	Dave Maloney (primary); Pete Stemkowski (during Maloney's absences)	Don La Greca or Pat O'Keefe
2023–24	WEPN	Kenny Albert (primary); Don La Greca (select games during Albert's NFL on Fox, TNT, Knicks on MSG, or Rangers on MSG TV assignments); Ed Cohen (select games during Albert's NFL on Fox, TNT, Knicks on MSG, or Rangers on MSG TV assignments); Sam Rosen (during select national broadcasts); Alex Faust (select games)	Dave Maloney (primary); Pete Stemkowski (during Maloney's absences)	Don La Greca or Pat O'Keefe
2022–23	WEPN	Kenny Albert (primary); Don La Greca (select games during Albert's NFL on Fox, TNT, Knicks on MSG, or Rangers on MSG TV assignments); Ed Cohen (select games during Albert's NFL on Fox, TNT, Knicks on MSG, or Rangers on MSG TV assignments); Sam Rosen (during select national broadcasts)	Dave Maloney (primary); Pete Stemkowski (during Maloney's absences)	Don La Greca or Pat O'Keefe
2021–22	WEPN	Kenny Albert (primary); Don La Greca (select games during Albert's NFL on Fox, TNT, Knicks on MSG, or Rangers on MSG TV assignments); Ed Cohen (select games during Albert's NFL on Fox, TNT, Knicks on MSG, or Rangers on MSG TV assignments); Sam Rosen (during select national broadcasts)	Dave Maloney (primary); Pete Stemkowski (during Maloney's absences)	Don La Greca or Pat O'Keefe
2021	WEPN	Kenny Albert (primary); Don La Greca (select games during Albert's NFL on Fox, NBC Sports, Knicks on MSG, or Rangers on MSG TV assignments); Ed Cohen (select games during Albert's NFL on Fox, NBC Sports, Knicks on MSG, or Rangers on MSG TV assignments); Sam Rosen (during select national broadcasts)	Dave Maloney (primary); Pete Stemkowski (during Maloney's absences)	Don La Greca or Pat O'Keefe

=== 2010s ===
Year	Channel	Play-by-play	Color commentator(s)	Studio host
2019–20	WEPN	Kenny Albert (primary); Don La Greca (during Albert's NFL on Fox, NBC Sports, Knicks on MSG, or MLB on Fox TV assignments); Sam Rosen (during select national broadcasts)	Dave Maloney (primary); Pete Stemkowski (during Maloney's absences)	Don La Greca or Pat O'Keefe
2018–19	WEPN	Kenny Albert (primary); Don La Greca (during Albert's NFL on Fox, NBC Sports, Knicks on MSG, or MLB on Fox TV assignments); Sam Rosen (during select national broadcasts)	Dave Maloney (primary); Pete Stemkowski (during Maloney's absences)	Don La Greca or Pat O'Keefe
2017–18	WEPN	Kenny Albert (primary); Don La Greca (during Albert's NFL on Fox, NBC Sports, Knicks on MSG, or MLB on Fox TV assignments); Sam Rosen (during select national broadcasts)	Dave Maloney (primary); Pete Stemkowski (during Maloney's absences)	Don La Greca or Pat O'Keefe
2016–17	WEPN	Kenny Albert (primary); Don La Greca (during Albert's NFL on Fox, NBC Sports, Knicks on MSG, or MLB on Fox TV assignments); Sam Rosen (during select national broadcasts)	Dave Maloney (primary); Pete Stemkowski (during Maloney's absences)	Don La Greca or Joe Tolleson
2015–16	WEPN	Kenny Albert (primary); Don La Greca (during Albert's NFL on Fox, NBC Sports, Knicks on MSG, or MLB on Fox TV assignments)	Dave Maloney (primary); Pete Stemkowski (during Maloney's absences)	Don La Greca or Joe Tolleson
2014–15	WEPN	Kenny Albert (primary); Don La Greca (during Albert's NFL on Fox, NBC Sports, Knicks on MSG, or MLB on Fox TV assignments)	Dave Maloney (primary); Pete Stemkowski (during Maloney's absences)	Don La Greca or Joe Tolleson
2013–14	WEPN	Kenny Albert (primary); Don La Greca (during Albert's NFL on Fox, NBC Sports, Knicks on MSG, or MLB on Fox TV assignments)	Dave Maloney (primary); Pete Stemkowski (during Maloney's absences)	Don La Greca or Joe Tolleson
2012–13	WEPN	Kenny Albert (primary); Don La Greca (during Albert's NFL on Fox, NBC Sports, Knicks on MSG, or MLB on Fox TV assignments)	Dave Maloney (primary); Pete Stemkowski (during Maloney's absences)	Don La Greca or Joe Tolleson
2011–12	WEPN	Kenny Albert (primary); Don La Greca (during Albert's NFL on Fox, NBC Sports, Knicks on MSG, or MLB on Fox TV assignments)	Dave Maloney (primary); Pete Stemkowski (during Maloney's absences)	Don La Greca or Joe Tolleson
2010–11	WEPN	Kenny Albert (primary); Don La Greca (during Albert's NFL on Fox, NBC Sports, Knicks on MSG, or MLB on Fox TV assignments)	Dave Maloney (primary); Pete Stemkowski (during Maloney's absences)	Don La Greca or Joe Tolleson

=== 2000s ===
Year	Channel	Play-by-play	Color commentator(s)	Studio host
2009–10	WEPN	Kenny Albert (primary); Don La Greca (during Albert's NFL on Fox, NBC Sports, Knicks on MSG, or MLB on Fox TV assignments)	Dave Maloney (primary); Pete Stemkowski (during Maloney's absences)	Don La Greca
2008–09	WEPN	Kenny Albert (primary); Don La Greca (during Albert's NFL on Fox, NBC Sports, Knicks on MSG, or MLB on Fox TV assignments)	Dave Maloney (primary); Pete Stemkowski (during Maloney's absences)	Don La Greca
2007–08	WEPN	Kenny Albert (primary); John Giannone (select games during Albert's NFL on Fox, NBC Sports, Knicks on MSG, or MLB on Fox TV assignments); Don La Greca (select games during Albert's NFL on Fox, NBC Sports, Knicks on MSG, or MLB on Fox TV assignments)	Dave Maloney (primary); Pete Stemkowski (during Maloney's absences)	Don La Greca
2006–07	WEPN	Kenny Albert (primary); Mike Crispino (select games during Albert's NFL on Fox, NBC Sports, Knicks on MSG, or MLB on Fox TV assignments); Joe Tolleson (select games during Albert's NFL on Fox, NBC Sports, Knicks on MSG, or MLB on Fox TV assignments)	Dave Maloney (primary); Pete Stemkowski (when Maloney is on MSG Network assignments)	Don La Greca
2005–06	WEPN	Kenny Albert (primary); John Giannone (during Albert's NFL on Fox, NBC Sports, Knicks on MSG, or MLB on Fox TV assignments); Don La Greca (during Albert's NFL on Fox, NBC Sports, Knicks on MSG, or MLB on Fox TV assignments)	Dave Maloney (primary); Pete Stemkowski (when Maloney is on MSG Network assignments)	Don La Greca
2003–04	WFAN	Kenny Albert	Brian Mullen	
2002–03	WFAN	Kenny Albert	Sal Messina	
2001–02	WFAN	Kenny Albert	Sal Messina	
2000–01	WFAN	Kenny Albert	Sal Messina	

=== 1990s ===
Year	Channel	Play-by-play	Color commentator(s)	Studio host
1999–2000	WFAN	Kenny Albert	Sal Messina	
1998–99	WFAN	Kenny Albert	Sal Messina	
1997–98	WFAN	Kenny Albert	Sal Messina	
1996–97	WFAN	Kenny Albert	Sal Messina	
1995–96	WFAN	Kenny Albert	Sal Messina	
1994–95	WFAN	Marv Albert	Sal Messina	
1993–94	WFAN–AM 660 (main); WEVD–AM 1050 (alternate)	Marv Albert (main); Howie Rose (alternate)	Sal Messina	Howie Rose (main); Steve Somers (alternate)
1992–93	WFAN	Marv Albert	Sal Messina	
1991–92	WFAN	Marv Albert	Sal Messina	
1990–91	WFAN	Marv Albert	Sal Messina	

=== 1980s ===
Year	Channel	Play-by-play	Color commentator(s)	Studio host
1989–90	WFAN	Marv Albert	Sal Messina	
1988–89	WFAN	Marv Albert	Sal Messina	
1987–88	WNBC	Marv Albert	Sal Messina	Mike Emrick
1986–87	WNBC	Marv Albert	Sal Messina	Mike Emrick
1985–86	WNBC	Marv Albert	Sal Messina	Mike Emrick
1984–85	WPAT/WGBB/WFAS	Marv Albert	Sal Messina	Mike Emrick
1984–85	WPAT/WGBB/WFAS	Marv Albert	Sal Messina	Mike Emrick
1984–85	WPAT/WGBB/WFAS	Marv Albert	Sal Messina	Mike Emrick
1983–84	WNEW	Marv Albert	Sal Messina	Sam Rosen
1982–83	WNEW	Marv Albert	Sal Messina	Sam Rosen
1981–82	WNEW	Marv Albert	Sal Messina	Sam Rosen
1980–81	WNEW	Marv Albert	Sal Messina	Sam Rosen

=== 1970s ===
Year	Channel	Play-by-play	Color commentator(s)	Studio host
1979–80	WNEW	Marv Albert	Sal Messina	Sam Rosen
1978–79	WNEW	Marv Albert	Sal Messina	Sam Rosen
1977–78	WNEW	Marv Albert	Sal Messina	Sam Rosen
1976–77	WNEW	Marv Albert	Sal Messina	
1975–76	WNEW	Marv Albert	Sal Messina	
1974–75	WNEW	Marv Albert	Sal Messina	
1973–74	WNBC	Marv Albert	Bill Chadwick	
1972–73	WNBC	Marv Albert	Bill Chadwick	Gene Stuart
1971–72	WNBC	Marv Albert	Bill Chadwick	
1970–71	WHN	Marv Albert	Bill Chadwick	Dave Marash

==== Notes ====
For many years when he was the radio voice of the Rangers, Marv Albert missed more games than he called. Marv had multiple commitments that forced him to miss games. The alternate radio play-by-play announcers from 1985–1987 actually did more games than Marv Albert. In his 19-year career as the color commentator, Sal Messina worked with 18 different play-by-play partners, even though nominally his only partners were Marv or Kenny Albert. Messina also did play-by-play on several games. Sal Messina also sometimes did TV, filling in for Bill Chadwick, Phil Esposito, and later John Davidson. So there were some additional radio analysts at times. Pete Stemkowski, Dave Maloney, Ron Greschner, Pierre Larouche, Emile Francis, Chris Nilan, and Ulf Nilsson filled in for Messina. During the years when only the non-televised road games were broadcast, at times the TV crew, Sal Marchiano/Bill Chadwick (in 1972–73), Jim Gordon/Chadwick, and Gordon/Phil Esposito later did the games on radio, especially on lengthy road trips.

=== 1960s ===
Year	Channel	Play-by-play	Color commentator(s)
1969–70	WHN	Marv Albert	Bill Chadwick
1968–69	WHN	Marv Albert	Bill Chadwick
1967–68	WHN	Marv Albert	Bill Chadwick
1966–67	WHN	Marv Albert	
1965–66	WHN	Marv Albert	
1964–65	WCBS	Win Elliot	
1963–64	WCBS	Win Elliot	
1962–63	WCBS	Jim Gordon	
1961–62	WINS	Jim Gordon	

=== 1950s ===
Year	Channel	Play-by-play	Color commentator(s)	Studio host
1959–60	WINS	Jim Gordon		Monty Hall
1958–59	WINS	Jim Gordon		Monty Hall
1957–58	WINS	Ward Wilson		
1956–57	WINS	Ward Wilson		
1955–56	WINS	Ward Wilson		
1954–55	WMGM	Ward Wilson		
1953–54	WMGM	Bert Lee	Ward Wilson	
1952–53	WMGM	Bert Lee	Ward Wilson	
1951–52	WMGM	Bert Lee	Ward Wilson	
1950–51	WMGM	Bert Lee	Ward Wilson	

=== 1940s ===
Year	Channel	Play-by-play	Color commentator(s)
1949–50	WMGM	Bert Lee	Ward Wilson
1948–49	WMGM	Bert Lee	Ward Wilson
1947–48	WHN	Bert Lee	Ward Wilson
1946–47	WHN	Bert Lee	Ward Wilson
1945–46	WHN	Bert Lee	Ward Wilson
1944–45	WHN	Bert Lee	Ward Wilson
1943–44	WHN	Bert Lee	
1942–43	WHN	Bert Lee	
1941–42	WHN	Bert Lee	
1940–41	WHN	Bert Lee	

=== 1930s ===
Year	Channel	Play-by-play
1939–40	WHN	Bert Lee
1931–32	WMCA	Jack Filman
1930–31	WMCA	Jack Filman

=== 1920s ===
Year	Channel	Play-by-play	Studio host
1928–29	WMSG	Jack Filman	
1927–28	WMSG	Jack Filman	Horace Beaver

It was not until the 1987–88 season that all Rangers' games was broadcast locally on radio in New York; for many years prior to that, only home games and (after the late 1940s) a handful of away games were heard. Regular-season away games heard on radio after the early 1960s were generally not broadcast locally on television.

=== Former affiliates (16 stations) ===
- WPTR/1540: Albany
- WCSS/1490: Amsterdam
- WGBB/1240: Freeport (1984-1985)
- WHUC/1230: Hudson
- WIZR/930: Johnstown
- WMCA/570: New York City (1930-1932)
- WFAN/660: New York City (1971-1974), (1986-2004)
- WCBS/880: New York City (1962-1965)
- WPAT/930: Paterson (1984-1985)
- WINS/1010: New York City (1955-1962), (1958-1960), (1961-1962)
- WEPN/1050: New York City (1939-1955), (1965-1971), (1993-1994), (2005-2012)
- WNEW/1130: New York City (1974-1984)
- WMSG/1410: New York City (1927-1929)
- WEPN-FM/98.7: New York City (2012-2024)
- WVKZ/1240: Schenectady
- WFAS/1230: White Plains (1984-1985)

== Alternate announcers ==
=== Television ===
==== Play-by-play ====
- Bruce Beck: 1982–1984
- Mike Crispino: 2005–2007
- John Giannone: 2005–present
- Kenny Albert: 2020–2015
- Bob Wischusen: 2006–2007
- Alex Faust: 2025-present

==== Color commentator ====
- Sal Messina: 1972–2004
- Dave Maloney: 2005–2025
- Brian Boyle: 2025-present

==== Studio host ====
- John Giannone: 2005–present
- Bill Pidto: 2009–present

=== Radio ===
==== Play-by-play ====
- Bob Wolff: 1970–1980
- Tim Ryan: 1971–1972
- Spencer Ross: 1973–2007
- John Sterling: 1973–1974
- Jim Gordon: 1973–1984
- Sal Messina: 1975–1982
- Barry Landers: 1976–1977, 1999–2000
- Sam Rosen: 1977–1989
- Al Albert: 1982–1983
- Mike Emrick: 1983–1988
- John Kelly: 1988–1989
- Howie Rose: 1985–1995
- Kenny Albert: 1995–1997
- Al Trautwig: 1995–1997
- Gary Cohen: 1995–1997
- Chris Moore: 1995–1996
- Joe Beninati: 1996–1997
- Steve Albert: 1996–1997
- Bob Wischusen: 2000–2007
- Joe Tolleson: 2002–present
- Mike Crispino: 2005–2007
- John Giannone: 2006–2008
- Don La Greca: 2008–2025
- Alex Thomas: 2025-present

==== Color commentator ====
- Pete Stemkowski: 2005–Present

==== Studio host ====
- Steve Somers: 1990s
