= List of New York Giants broadcasters =

As of 2008, the New York Giants' flagship radio station is WFAN-AM/FM. Games that overlap with New York Yankees baseball broadcasts in the early season are carried strictly by WFAN’s AM signal at 660 AM while the Yankees broadcasts are carried strictly over the FM signal at 101.9 FM.

Preseason telecasts not seen nationally aired in the area on WNYW FOX/5 in 2024, due to their usual broadcast partner WNBC NBC/4 covering the Olympics.

== Past ==
WFAN has produced the Giants' radio broadcasts since the mid-'90s, but has not always aired them on the station. The first year of production saw the games airing on the team's flagship station at the time, WOR. For the following season, the radio casts aired simultaneously on both WOR and WFAN, with the games moving solely to the latter the next year. In 1999 WFAN decided to begin airing the Giants broadcast on sister station WNEW-FM, a practice it ended after one season. The Giants' radio casts moved back to WFAN and has been there ever since.

The Giants' longtime radio home was WNEW-AM, where games aired from 1961 until 1993 when the station was bought by Bloomberg L.P. and changed its format. Marty Glickman teamed with Al DeRogatis for a long stretch beginning in the early 1960s on WNEW-AM. Chip Cipolla and later Sam Huff joined Glickman after DeRogatis left to join Curt Gowdy on NBC. After the WNEW split, games began airing on WOR. Glickman moved to the crosstown Jets in 1973 and was succeeded by Marv Albert. Jim Gordon succeeded Albert in 1977, beginning an 18-year tenure as the Giants' play-by-play voice. Meanwhile, Dick Lynch took over as color analyst in 1976 and continued in that role through the 2007 season, with his last game being Super Bowl XLII. Lynch did not return to the booth for 2008 due to illness (leukemia), which took his life in September 2008.

Eventually, Gordon and Lynch were joined by Karl Nelson, a former lineman for the Giants. Gordon and Nelson were fired after the 1994 season, after which Papa took over the play-by-play (after being studio host) and led a two-man booth with Lynch. The broadcast team would not have another third member until Dave Jennings was fired from his job as a radio analyst for the Jets in 2002. Jennings was moved to the pregame show after the 2006 season and was replaced by Carl Banks.

After WFAN began airing games Richard Neer served as pregame and postgame host. Eventually, Sid Rosenberg served as pregame and postgame host for home games. They were replaced by Chris Carlin, who in turn was replaced by Salzberg for 2008.

The Giants were carried on the DuMont Network, then CBS (New York's Channel 2) in the early TV days of the NFL, when home games were blacked out within a 75-mile radius of New York City. Chris Schenkel was their play-by-play announcer in that early era when each team was assigned its own network voice on its regional telecasts. At the time, there were few if any true national telecasts until the NFL championship game, which was carried by NBC. Schenkel was joined by Jim McKay, later Johnny Lujack through the 1950s and the early 1960s. As Giants players retired to the broadcast booth in the early and 1960s, first Pat Summerall, then Frank Gifford took the color analyst slot next to Schenkel. As the 1970 merger of the NFL and AFL approached, CBS moved to a more generic announcer approach and Schenkel was off the broadcasts.

Giants regular-season Sunday telecasts moved to Fox when that network took over NFC telecasts in 1994.

== Broadcasters by year ==
Years	Flagship station	Play-by-Play	Color commentator	Sideline reporter
1940	WHN	Dick Fishell	Bert Lee	
1941	WHN	Dick Fishell	Bert Lee	
1942	WHN	Red Barber	Alan Hale	
1943	WHN	Red Barber	Connie Desmond	
1944	WHN	Red Barber	Connie Desmond	
1945	WHN	Red Barber	Connie Desmond	
1946	WHN	Red Barber	Connie Desmond	
1947	WHN	Connie Desmond	Stan Lomax	
1948	WMGM	Connie Desmond	Bert Lee	
1949	WMGM	Marty Glickman	Harold Holtz	
1950	WMGM	Ted Husing	Marty Glickman	
1951	WMGM	Marty Glickman	Ernie Harwell	
1952-1953	WMGM	Marty Glickman	Chris Schenkel	
1954-1955	WMGM	Marty Glickman	Johnny Most	
1956	WINS	Les Keiter	Tommy Henrich	
1957	WINS	Les Keiter	John Condon	
1958	WCBS	Les Keiter	Jack Drees	
1959	WCBS	Les Keiter	Tom Dowd	
1960	WCBS	Mel Allen		
1961	WNEW	Marty Glickman	Joe Hasel and Al DeRogatis	
1962–1963	WNEW	Marty Glickman	Al DeRogatis	
1964–1966	WNEW	Marty Glickman	Kyle Rote and Al DeRogatis	
1967	WNEW	Marty Glickman	Chip Cipolla and Al DeRogatis	
1968	WNEW	Marty Glickman	Chip Cipolla and Charlie Conerly	
1969-1971	WNEW	Marty Glickman	Chip Cipolla	
1972	WNEW	Marty Glickman	Chip Cipolla and Sam Huff	
1973-1974	WNEW	Marv Albert	Chip Cipolla and Sam Huff	
1975	WNEW	Marv Albert	Chip Cipolla and Dick Lynch	
1976	WNEW	Marv Albert	Dick Lynch	
1977-1987	WNEW	Jim Gordon	Dick Lynch	
1988-1992	WNEW	Jim Gordon	Karl Nelson and Dick Lynch	
1993	WOR	Jim Gordon	Karl Nelson and Dick Lynch	
1994-1995	WOR	Bob Papa	Dick Lynch	
1996-2001	WFAN	Bob Papa	Dick Lynch	
2002–2006	WFAN	Bob Papa	Dick Lynch and Dave Jennings	
2007	WFAN	Bob Papa	Dick Lynch and Carl Banks	Howard Cross
2008–present	WFAN	Bob Papa	Carl Banks	Howard Cross
