= Jim Gordon (sportscaster) =

American sportscaster (1927–2003)

- Born: February 15, 1927; Brooklyn, New York, U.S.
- Died: February 16, 2003 (aged 76); Putnam Valley, New York, U.S.
- Occupations: radio and television announcer, sportscaster
- Years active: 1960s–1994

Jim Gordon (February 15, 1927 – February 16, 2003) was an American television and radio newscaster and play-by-play sportscaster in the New York City area for nearly 40 years.

He delivered the first newscast for New York's WINS radio when it switched from a Top 40 rock music format to all-news in 1965 and also had long tenures as the television "voice" of the NHL New York Rangers and radio voice of the NFL New York Giants.

Later in life, he was also active in local politics in Putnam County, New York.

== Career ==
Gordon's career began in Syracuse, NY. In the mid-1950s he moved to his native New York City and over the next four decades worked at several major radio stations in various sports and news capacities, including WMGM and its successors, WHN, WINS, WABC, WNEW-AM and WOR. In addition to his broadcasting roles, he served as news director of WABC and WNEW.

Early in his New York radio career, he hosted pre and post-game programs on WMGM broadcasts of Brooklyn Dodgers baseball games. He also called college sports and boxing matches.

As a news reporter, he covered riots and blackouts in New York and anchored WINS' coverage of the Apollo 11 Moon landing mission on July 20, 1969.

Gordon began calling New York sporting events when he was hired by Madison Square Garden in 1955 to be the radio voice of the Rangers and Knicks. He worked in those capacities on-and-off in both radio and television over the next three decades, occasionally alternating with other New York sportscasters like Bill Chadwick, Marty Glickman, Les Keiter, Bob Wolff, Win Elliot, Tim Ryan, Don Criqui and Marv Albert.

In between Knicks and Rangers assignments, he appeared on CBS Sports' NHL coverage as a commentator alongside Stu Nahan and lead play-by-play man Dan Kelly, and he also was the original television voice of the New York Islanders, calling games in the 1972–73 season. Returning to the Rangers in the mid-1970s, he called their cable and broadcast TV games until 1984, when he was replaced by Sam Rosen. During some of those hockey seasons, he also called games on the syndicated NHL Network.

In 1977, Gordon was hired to replace Marv Albert as the radio voice of the New York Giants football team. For 18 seasons (ending in 1994) Gordon called games on both WNEW and WOR alongside Dick Lynch and (later) Karl Nelson. He was fired by WOR after the 1994 season and replaced by Bob Papa, effectively ending his broadcasting career.

== Notable calls ==
Gordon is best known for his call of Scott Norwood's 47-yard field goal attempt with eight seconds left in Super Bowl XXV, which would have won the game for the Buffalo Bills:

Snap, spot, in the air, it's got the distance, it is... NO GOOD!

His trademark catchphrase was "Giants have it!", used during plays that resulted in the Giants taking possession of the football, Norwood's field goal attempt included.

A near-iconic expression that Gordon used almost nightly while calling Rangers games: "Loose puck in front! (pause, followed by) No Ranger there."

When a Ranger player took a shot and missed the net completely his trademark call would be the seemingly contradictory, "Shot on Goal....wide"!

== Politics ==
Gordon was a resident of Putnam County, New York and served as a volunteer firefighter and in several elective positions. That included a decade as a Democratic member of its county legislature from 1986 to 1996. He was its chairman from 1990 to 1993.

== Death ==
Gordon died from cancer on February 16, 2003, one day after turning 76.

== Notes ==
Preceded by Win Eliot; Danny Gallivan and Dan Kelly	Stanley Cup Final American network television play-by-play announcer/color commentator 1967-1968; 1971-1972; 1979	Succeeded by Bill Mazer; Dan Kelly; Tim Ryan
