= Jay Jackson (announcer) =

American quiz show host (1918–2005)

- Born: Jesse Greene Jackson; November 4, 1918; Stockdale, Ohio, United States
- Died: August 16, 2005 (aged 86); Jupiter, Florida, United States
- Occupation(s): Actor, Radio/TV host, Narrator, Voice Over
- Spouse: Anne Elizabeth Rodgers Jackson

Jesse Greene "Jay" Jackson (November 4, 1918 – August 16, 2005) was an American radio and television quiz show host and announcer.

Jackson was the master of ceremonies of the panel quiz show Twenty Questions when it aired on the ABC Television Network starting in early 1953 and ending in May 1955. He then hosted the nighttime version of the popular quiz show Tic-Tac-Dough from its debut on September 12, 1957, through September 1958, yielding that job to Win Elliot for the remaining 13 weeks of the show's nighttime run (September 1957 – December 1958). Jackson was featured on an episode of The Honeymooners in which Ralph Kramden appears on a fictitious television quiz show called The $99,000 Answer, hosted by Jackson. The episode first aired over CBS on January 28, 1956.

When the quiz show scandals exploded in 1958, among the materials a federal grand jury investigated was a series of 1957 Tic-Tac-Dough episodes hosted by Jackson and preserved on kinescope, featuring U.S. Army captain Michael O'Rourke winning over $140,000 during his reign as champion. Jackson himself was never accused of any wrongdoing; it was noted that he left the show well before the investigations began in earnest. One episode in that series of shows is available through classic video sellers. After leaving Tic-Tac-Dough Jackson never hosted another quiz or game show, though he did narrate a series of Robert Youngson compilations during the 1960s.
