= Dazzling Dunks and Basketball Bloopers =

- Written by: Rob Burnett
- Produced by: Charlie Bloom
- Starring: Marv Albert; Frank Layden
- Production company: NBA Entertainment
- Distributed by: CBS/Fox Video
- Release date: 1989
- Running time: 45 minutes
- Country: United States
- Language: English

Dazzling Dunks and Basketball Bloopers is a 1989 American sports compilation film that features highlights and bloopers from the NBA from its beginning to the film's release in 1989. The film is hosted by broadcaster Marv Albert and former Utah Jazz coach and executive Frank Layden.

The VHS release of the film was originally distributed free with a subscription to Sports Illustrated magazine.

A sequel, titled The All-New Dazzling Dunks and Basketball Bloopers, was made in 1990, again featuring Albert and Layden as hosts.

== Cast ==
- Marv Albert
- Frank Layden

== Synopsis ==
The first video contains footage of slam dunks by NBA players such as Julius Erving, Dominique Wilkins, Michael Jordan, and Darryl Dawkins, and a large number of bloopers by various players, including Danny Ainge, Bill Walton, and Frank Johnson. Recaps of NBA slam dunk contests from 1984 to 1988 are also shown.

The second video features brief biographies of NBA personalities including Darryl Dawkins, Bill Walton, John Salley and Frank Layden, as well as footage of dolphins playing basketball, a group playing basketball while riding horses and a group playing basketball on ice skates. Recaps of the 1989 and 1990 NBA slam dunk contest are also shown.
