= Norman Mac Lean =

Canadian-American sportswriter

Norman Mac Lean was a sportswriter who wrote for The Associated Press, Reuters and United Press International. He was also managing editor for 25 issues of Who's Who in Baseball, beginning in 1973. In the 1970s, he served as a television personality covering the New York Rangers alongside Tim Ryan. He authored numerous books, including Casey Stengel: A Biography. He also wrote for The Sports Network. He was born April 1, 1930, in Truro, Nova Scotia Canada and died March 20, 2015.
