= Bill Chadwick =

American ice hockey referee (1915–2009)

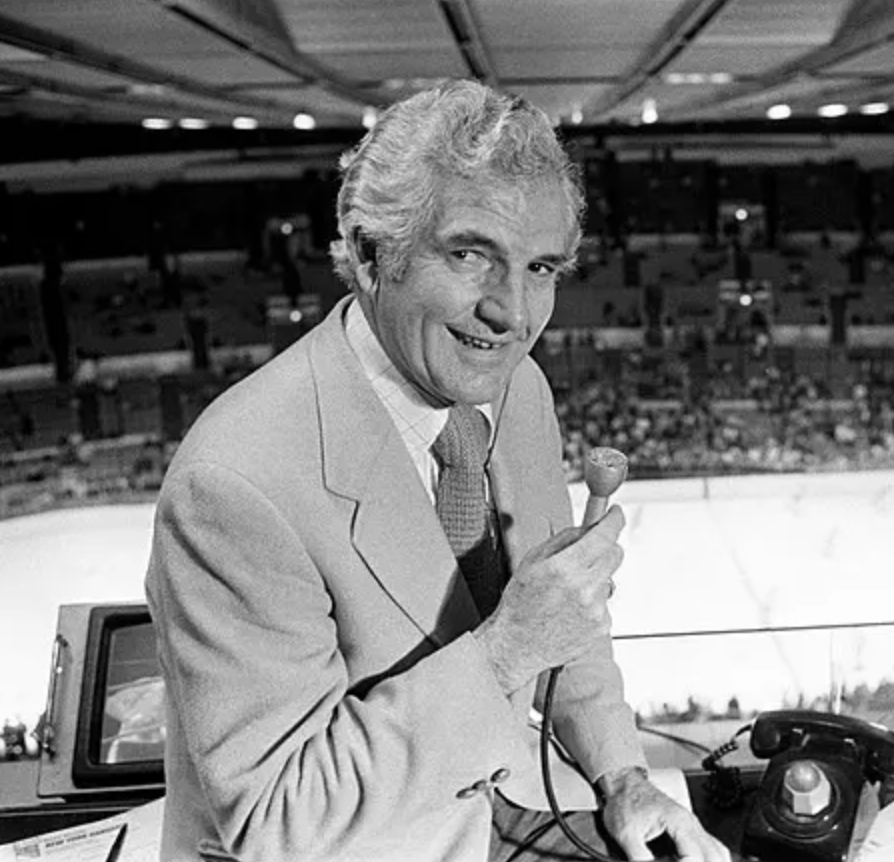
- Chadwick, c. 1973
- Born: William Leroy Chadwick; October 10, 1915; Manhattan, New York, U.S.
- Died: October 24, 2009 (aged 94); Cutchogue, New York, U.S.
- Occupations: Former NHL referee Broadcaster
- Honors: Hockey Hall of Fame (1964)

William Leroy "The Big Whistle" Chadwick (October 10, 1915 – October 24, 2009) was the first US-born referee to serve in the National Hockey League (NHL). Despite being blind in his right eye, his on-ice officiating career spanned the greater part of the 1940s and 1950s, during which he pioneered the system of hand signals for penalties which is now used in all hockey games internationally. He later was a popular broadcaster for the New York Rangers on radio and television.

== Amateur hockey playing career ==
Born in Manhattan, New York City, he attended Jamaica High School. While playing as a center for a Metropolitan Amateur Hockey League All-Star team at Madison Square Garden in 1935, he was struck in the right eye by an errant puck during a line change against a team from Boston. Even though the doctors at Manhattan Eye, Ear and Throat Hospital weren't able to restore vision to his right eye, he continued to play the sport with the New York Rovers of the Eastern Amateur Hockey League.

== NHL officiating pioneer ==
Chadwick was encouraged to become a referee by his former Rovers' coach, Tommy Lockhart. His first experience as an on-ice official was in a Rovers game in March 1937, when he substituted for the scheduled referee who was stuck in a snowstorm. His work in the amateur circuit caught the attention of then-NHL president Frank Calder, who hired him as the league's first American-born linesman in 1939. The first professional match Chadwick worked was between the Montreal Canadiens and New York Americans at The Garden.

After one year of service in the NHL, he was promoted to referee, eventually becoming the first one to use hand signals during games in the early 1940s. The system he developed was adopted by the NHL in 1956, one year after his retirement. During his fifteen seasons as a referee, he worked over 900 regular season contests and a record 42 Stanley Cup Finals matches 13 of them series deciders. He became the fifth on-ice official, the first American-born, to be inducted into the Hockey Hall of Fame in 1964.

== "The Big Whistle" ==
He has been elected to both the Hockey Hall of Fame and the United States Hockey Hall of Fame. Chadwick spent 14 seasons as a hockey color commentator both on radio and television for the New York Rangers. From 1967–72, he worked on radio with Marv Albert, and in 1972 moved to television broadcasts on WOR-TV, Channel 9, and the MSG Network. His 1972–73 partner was Sal Marchiano, and from 1973 to 1981 he was paired with Jim Gordon.

== Death ==
He died on October 24, 2009, at the age of 94.

== See also ==
- List of members of the United States Hockey Hall of Fame
