= Sports Phone =

Telephone service in the United States

Sports Phone was a telephone service in the United States that allowed users to hear sports scores and information. The service was launched in 1972, and after initially failing it was relaunched three years later. The service gained a following, and by 1981 had hit a peak of 50 million calls in a year. Sports Phone began in New York City, but expanded to offer programming in numerous other locations, including Chicago and Detroit. The rise of sports radio stations and score tickers on television broadcasts helped reduce the popularity of Sports Phone, before an increase in Internet usage led to its demise in 2000.

Callers to Sports Phone heard messages of one minute or less, with up to 30 scores provided in a given update. In addition to scores, the service's programming included news and interviews, along with a sports trivia game. Some information was recorded specifically for certain markets. The announcers for Sports Phone included future broadcasters of several franchises in the major U.S. sports leagues.

== History ==
Sports Phone was first introduced on November 1, 1972, after a month of service testing. The original owner was New York Telephone employee Jack Goodfellow. Customers were charged 10 cents per one-minute phone call, with New York Telephone the recipient of all charges and a fee from Sports Phone for each call. Goodfellow's intention was for the service to make money from advertisements included with the service's updates, but the business model proved unsuccessful. In 1973, Air Time Inc., a media entity, purchased rights to the service. New York Telephone later allowed for information service operators to retain part of the call fees, and Sports Phone was relaunched in 1975.

The service used multiple telephone numbers, including at least one alternate number, but the most well-known was 976-1313 (changed from 999-1313). Future broadcaster John Giannone claimed that, among New York City sports enthusiasts, "Everyone 45 and over can recite" the number. By 1976, Sports Phone was receiving an average of 65,000 calls daily. It appealed strongly to sports bettors, as it allowed users to access updates on games from the West Coast of the U.S., which frequently ended after broadcasts of television news programs. The service experienced a record period of activity in 1977, as the New York Mets were completing a trade with the Cincinnati Reds in which Tom Seaver was sent to the Reds. Sports Phone had 600,000 callers over a three-day span.

The growth in Sports Phone's usage continued in the late 1970s and early 1980s. Daily call figures moved up to around 100,000 in 1979, with peaks of three times that figure on some weekend days when college or pro football games were being held. By 1981, New York Telephone was making $3 million from Sports Phone over a year; 50 million calls were made to Sports Phone that year; the only Dial-it service that received more activity was the one for off-track betting. The service expanded to markets outside New York City as well. In 1977, Sports Phone introduced a line with updates that focused on Chicago; two years later, Detroit received its own line. New Jersey and Buffalo were later added as markets with their own numbers. Daily call numbers in Chicago had hit around 65,000 by 1984, although they reportedly peaked at 175,000.

Sports Phone had competition in the field by 1983, as a three-year-old national rival service, Dial-It, was receiving approximately 350,000 calls weekly. By 1985, Sports Phone's business model had changed, as its parent company, Phone Programs, was earning 2 cents per call from New York Telephone and making more than $1 million in revenue; this replaced a previous model in which Sports Phone received payments from AT&T before the breakup of the Bell System. Atlanta, Miami, and New Orleans had updates that were aimed at those markets by 1986.

Calls to Sports Phone numbers cost 50 cents by 1986. The service was facing increasing competition nationally from providers such as JD's National Score Phone, Dial Sports, and a line from USA Today. Sports Phone indicated that it planned to increase call lengths to 90 seconds following the beginning of the football schedule; this matched the time of Dial Sports' calls, which cost customers 10 cents less. A radio station dedicated to sports programming, WFAN, debuted in New York City in 1987. The initial concept for the station included score updates every 15 minutes, which were inspired by Sports Phone. WFAN positioned itself to compete against Sports Phone for the attention of the service's callers. One of the station's first promotional advertisements contained the line "We just made Sports Phone old news." Sports Phone employee Cory Eisner said, "We knew right away (WFAN) was going to come after us." At the same time that sports radio was reducing the service's business, it was affected by an increase in the use of pagers by sports bettors and a rise in number blocks by businesses in the New York City region. Television stations also moved to provide scores to viewers, as both CBS and NBC added periodic score updates to their pro football telecasts.

A Boston-area number was introduced in 1988, to coincide with the Mike Tyson vs. Michael Spinks heavyweight championship fight. Services were also provided to the Cleveland and Phoenix markets, but proved unsuccessful. By 1990, Sports Phone had received nearly one billion calls over the service's life. By this time, though, cable television sports stations were providing score updates. In future years, the Internet would offer scores and news in real time. Caller activity at Sports Phone fell to 1,000 or less daily. The service's last general manager, radio broadcaster Don La Greca, said of Sports Phone's decline, "Technology that helped us update then became available to the general public, and so there was no reason to have us." The service was shut down in 2000.

== Programming ==
In the earliest incarnation of Sports Phone, each one-minute call allowed the caller to hear 46 seconds of sports scores. The remaining 14 seconds of the call were taken up by two commercials, each of which lasted seven seconds. When the service was reintroduced in 1975, the length of a call fell to between 57 and 58 seconds. The reduction in time allowed customers to hang up within 60 seconds, the length of a message unit as defined by the Federal Communications Commission. Recordings were not extended in cases when the announcers had not finished reciting scores; as many as 30 game scores could be fit into the required time frame. Updated score readings were usually done approximately once every 10 to 15 minutes through the conclusion of a night's sports events. For Sundays in which pro football was being played, the rate was much quicker, with just two minutes between updates. Sports Phone announcers initially received scores through ticker tape, but later placed employees in press boxes at events for quicker reporting times. Reporters who cooperated with Sports Phone by providing updates were paid at a rate of $20 per night; alternatively, staffers at Sports Phone would place calls into press boxes seeking updates. Employees also sought to record interviews with players, which were incorporated in Sports Phone's updates. Some interviews were recorded on-site, while others were done by announcers at the service's headquarters; the latter approach was used in 1976 by Howie Rose, who interviewed hockey player Darryl Sittler after he had posted a 10-point game.

Sports Phone had various kinds of filler programming that it aired during days, when there were generally fewer sporting events to report on than nights. In the beginning, updates in the daytime were recorded less frequently than during the night, at 30-minute intervals. Along with updates on baseball games that were in progress, announcers incorporated news and editorial content, in addition to interviews. During the 1981 Major League Baseball strike, when Sports Phone was suffering from a lack of content, the service reported the results of a fictional best-of-seven series between the 1961 New York Yankees and 1969 New York Mets, which was simulated with the Strat-O-Matic tabletop game. According to announcer Mike Walczewski, the series led to a 400 percent spike in Sports Phone's call volume. By 1982, daytime updates had been sped up to occur about every 15 minutes. Other information that the service provided included statistics, harness racing results, and listings of pitchers in upcoming baseball games. One other type of programming that gained a following was a sports trivia game known as the "Quickie Quiz". An announcer asked a trivia question during an update, and callers contacted a different phone number to answer. Winners were given 15 seconds of air time on a Sports Phone update to discuss a topic of their choice.

Some content was added in certain locations' updates to appeal to the local markets. Different sports were mentioned in updates, along with reports on teams of local interest. This included listings of golf course and tennis court wait times as well. The New York City operations center handled updates for multiple cities in the southern part of the U.S.

As the popularity of Sports Phone started to decline, a new feature was launched that provided more detailed play-by-play information on games. Customers were charged 99 cents per minute for the calls, which did not have the regular service's time limit. La Greca once provided three consecutive hours of baseball play-by-play to one caller; the announcer stated that the target market for the play-by-play line was "the degenerate gambler." In the final years of Sports Phone's existence, announcers often obtained score information on the Internet before recording updates.

== Announcers ==
Writer Joe DeLessio described Sports Phone as "a launching pad for young voices looking to break into broadcasting." The employees who announced updates for the service included future television broadcasters of the Mets and New York Yankees baseball clubs, and the New Jersey Devils and New York Islanders of the National Hockey League. La Greca, after beginning his career at Sports Phone, became a radio broadcaster for the New York Rangers and an ESPN Radio host in New York City. Mets announcer Howie Rose, who began working for Sports Phone in 1975, likened his position to "anchoring the CBS Evening News".

A steady stream of announcers at the service's New York City operations came from Fordham University. Future Yankees television announcer Michael Kay and New York Giants radio voice Bob Papa were among the Fordham attendees who later announced for Sports Phone. Some Sports Phone announcers who provided updates to southern locations, including Papa, applied pseudonyms in an effort "to sound less ethnic."
