= Connie Desmond =

American sports broadcaster (1908–1983)

- Born: Cornelius Desmond; January 31, 1908
- Died: March 10, 1983 (aged 75); Toledo, Ohio, U.S.
- Occupation: sports broadcaster
- Years active: 1931–1967
- Known for: broadcaster for New York City sports teams
- Notable work: Brooklyn Dodgers broadcaster

Cornelius "Connie" Desmond (January 31, 1908 – March 10, 1983) was an American sportscaster, most prominently for the Brooklyn Dodgers of Major League Baseball.

== Biography ==
Desmond graduated from the University of Notre Dame in 1931 and began his broadcasting career with WSPD in his hometown of Toledo, Ohio. In 1932, he became the voice of the minor league Toledo Mud Hens. WSPD stopped broadcasting Mud Hens games in 1940 and no other station picked up the team. Desmond then took a job with WCOL in Columbus, Ohio, where he called games for the AAA Columbus Red Birds as well as the Ohio State Buckeyes football team.

Mel Allen was impressed enough with Desmond that he asked him to come to New York City as his sidekick on the home games of the Yankees and Giants in 1942. After one year, he left and joined Red Barber on the Dodgers broadcasts, replacing Al Helfer. During the 1943 season, Barber and Desmond were the only voices of baseball in New York. The Giants and Yankees suspended broadcasts that year for unknown reasons. Desmond remained with the Dodgers until he resigned in August 1956, teaming with Barber (1943–1953), Ernie Harwell (1948–1949), and Vin Scully (1950–1956). In the 1940s Desmond also teamed with Barber to call college football and New York Giants football, and with Marty Glickman to call college basketball and New York Knicks basketball. Desmond was also a fairly accomplished singer. In the early 1940s he hosted several music shows on WOR, with himself as the featured singer.

Desmond battled alcoholism for many years, and frequently missed games because he was too drunk to go on the air. Dodgers owner Walter O'Malley finally lost patience with him and fired him prior to the 1955 World Series. Thus, Desmond missed his chance to call the Dodgers' only world title on the East Coast. Desmond asked for and got another chance in 1956, but was fired for good after several more absences. He was succeeded by Jerry Doggett.

In 1965, he became the executive vice president and program director of the Red Carpet Network, which provided radio programing for New York City taxi cabs.

In 1967, Desmond briefly returned to baseball broadcasting, calling Toledo Mud Hens games with Frankie Gilhooley on WCWA.

By 1982, Desmond was living in a senior apartment complex in Toledo. He died March 10, 1983 at the age of 75.

Desmond and his wife had two children, whom they raised in Flower Hill, New York.
