= The Michael Kay Show =

- Genre: Sports talk
- Running time: 2 hours (1:00 – 3:00 p.m. ET)
- Country of origin: United States
- Language: English
- Home station: WHSQ 880 AM (2002–Present)
- Syndicates: XM 93 Sirius 202 (2011–2023); Sirius 206 (2023-Present)
- TV adaptations: YES Network (2014–2024)
- Starring: Michael Kay

The Michael Kay Show is a sports radio talk show airing on the New York City radio station WHSQ 880 ESPN New York, hosted by New York Yankees television play-by-play broadcaster Michael Kay. New York Rangers pre and post-game radio host Don La Greca and WWE Network and Hot 97 radio host Peter Rosenberg were former co-hosts through 2024. The show can be heard on Sirius XM Radio channel 206 (formally Sirius XM 202) and was simulcast on the television station YES Network until 2024. The show premiered in 2002.

== History ==
The show began airing on the radio on July 15, 2002, and on TV in 2014. On his radio show, Kay delves into a variety of topics related to current sports, especially those notable in the New York area. Kay also touches on non-sports topics in popular culture and public controversy on occasion.

In December 2024, Kay revealed that the show would be ending, with him beginning a solo show from 1-3 pm, while LaGreca and Rosenberg would begin a new show with Alan Hahn from 3-7 pm. The final episode of that iteration of "The Michael Kay Show" aired on December 13, 2024. On January 6, 2025, the new version of the show from 1-3 pm, with Michael Kay only, began airing.

== On-air talent ==
- Michael Kay
- Don La Greca (2002-2024)
- Peter Rosenberg, Co-Host and Host of The Evening Nightly News (ENN) (2015-2024)

== Radio production staff ==
- Andrew Gundling, Producer (2007-2022)
- Anthony Pucik, Board Op
