= Don La Greca =

American sports broadcaster and analyst

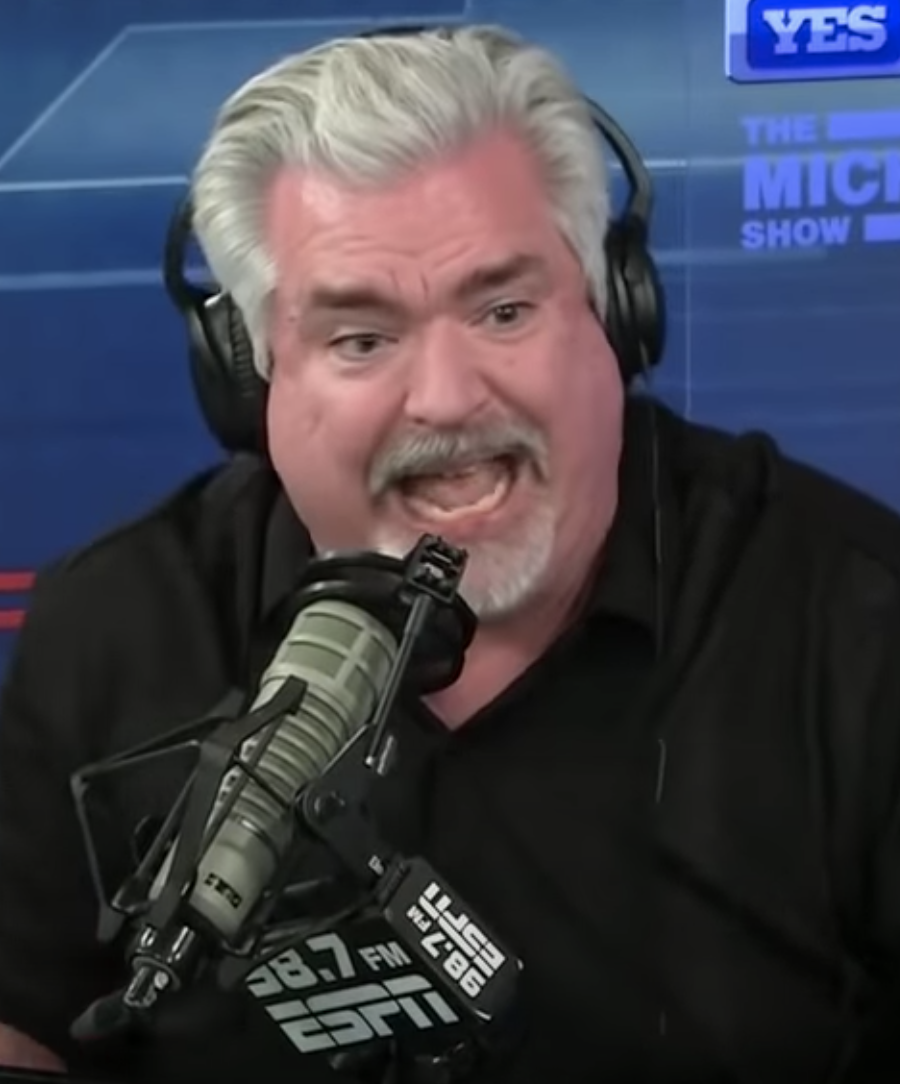
- La Greca on The Michael Kay Show.
- Born: February 13, 1968 (age 58)
- Occupation: Radio host
- Years active: 2001–present
- Known for: Co-host of Don, Hahn & Rosenberg
- Spouse: Nancy La Greca
- Children: 2

Donald Marco La Greca (born February 13, 1968) is an American sports broadcaster and analyst. He is currently the lead broadcaster for the New Jersey Devils on MSGSN, and also hosts a daily radio program with Alan Hahn and Peter Rosenberg on ESPN Radio New York. La Greca also spent several years as the co-host of The Michael Kay Show and as studio host and substitute play by play announcer for New York Rangers broadcasts on the same station.

An alumnus of Ramapo College in New Jersey, La Greca received the Distinguished Citizens Award in 2014, which honors Ramapo graduates for their personal commitment to advance higher education, and for their significant service to the community.

== Broadcasting career ==
La Greca has been with ESPN New York radio from its inception in September 2001. He began his career with the Sports Phone service, before working as a sports anchor on 1010 WINS. La Greca formerly hosted ESPN New York's official "Jets Game Day" pregame show and "The 5th Quarter" postgame show.

Until 2025, La Greca worked for the Rangers as the fill-in for lead radio play-by-play announcer Kenny Albert. He served as the Rangers' play-by-play man for Game 1 of the Stanley Cup finals in the 2014 season, after Albert had to fill in for Mike Emrick on NBC. La Greca had called NHL playoff games before for ESPN New York Radio but calling game one was "a dream come true" according to La Greca.

La Greca was a co-host for The Michael Kay Show and was with the show since 2002. Starting in 2016, La Greca began hosting the ESPN hockey podcast, Game Misconduct. In January 2025, he became a co-host of Don, Hahn & Rosenberg.

On July 7, 2025, MSG Networks announced that La Greca would take over as the broadcast voice of the New Jersey Devils, replacing Bill Spaulding ahead of the 2025–26 NHL season.

== Personal life ==
La Greca is a native of Hawthorne, New Jersey. He currently lives in Somerset with his wife Nancy and their two children. Don has a brother named Dave who is also in broadcasting and hosts Busted Open, a radio show on SiriusXM based on professional wrestling.
