= John Giannone =

American sports journalist

- Occupation: Sportscaster

John Giannone is a sportscaster for the New York Rangers of the National Hockey League. He has worked for MSG Networks since 2002, mainly as a rinkside reporter and studio host. He has also done play-by-play, occasionally filling in for Sam Rosen, a role that Kenny Albert also fulfilled.
