= Sam Rosen (sportscaster) =

American sportscaster (born 1947)

- Born: Samuel Rosenblum; August 12, 1947 (age 79); Ulm, Germany
- Occupation: Sportscaster
- Spouse: Jill L. Eisenberg
- Children: 2

Sam Rosen (born Samuel Rosenblum, August 12, 1947) is an American retired sportscaster and Hockey Hall of Famer, best known as the former primary play-by-play announcer for the National Hockey League's New York Rangers games on MSG. In 2008, Rosen was inducted into the National Jewish Sports Hall of Fame. In 2016, Rosen was enshrined as the Foster Hewitt Memorial Award winner for outstanding contributions as a broadcaster by the Hockey Hall of Fame. In 2024 Rosen was named the recipient of the Lester Patrick trophy for outstanding service to hockey in the United States. At the time of his retirement in 2025, Rosen was the longest-tenured active broadcaster in the NHL.

== Early life ==
Rosen was born Samuel Rosenblum just after World War II in a Displaced Persons (DP) camp in Ulm, Germany, to Polish-Jewish parents Louis Rosenblum (1915–1987) and the former Gitel Reiner (1915–2006). His mother was born in Chełm, Poland. His grandparents had been killed in the Holocaust, while his parents had survived as refugees within Russia, where his older brother Stephen was born during the war.

The Rosenblum family moved to Brooklyn, New York, when Rosen was two years old. As a New York Yankees fan, Rosen became a fan of their broadcaster Mel Allen. Rosen attended Stuyvesant High School and the City College of New York. At both schools, Rosen played catcher and was the captain of the baseball team. He also played intramural basketball, and was on the track team in high school.

== Broadcasting career ==
=== New York Rangers ===
From childhood on, Rosen attended numerous New York Rangers games and taped himself doing play-by-play. He was mentored by veteran Rangers broadcaster Jim Gordon, eventually succeeding him in the fall of 1984. From 1982 to 1984, he was the studio host on Ranger broadcasts. Rosen's first partner was ex-Bruin and Ranger star Phil Esposito. Starting in 1986–87, when Esposito left to become Rangers general manager, Rosen was paired with former Rangers goaltender John Davidson (nicknamed J.D.). Sam and J.D. lasted 20 years together, the longest-serving NHL broadcast team, before Davidson left for a management position with the St. Louis Blues and later with the Columbus Blue Jackets Davidson returned to take over duties as the President of the Rangers on May 17, 2019 and return to Columbus on May 20, 2021.

Beginning with the 2006–07 NHL season, Rosen partnered with Joe Micheletti, who was New York Islanders TV color analyst with former Rangers radio announcer Howie Rose on Fox Sports Net New York.

Rosen's most famous call comes every time the Rangers score a goal on the power play. The call is simply the name of the player, followed by, "It's a power play goal!", but Rosen uses a unique inflection which has been widely popular among Rangers fans and a staple of any Rangers broadcast.

However, his two most memorable calls came during the Rangers run to the first Stanley Cup in 54 years. First, he called Stéphane Matteau's double overtime goal in game seven of the Eastern Conference Finals with:

Matteau moves with the puck. Matteau around the net. Matteau puts it, Score! Score! The Rangers win! The Rangers win! They're going to the Finals! The Rangers win!"

Then, when the Rangers won the Stanley Cup, the highest-rated game in MSG Network history:

The waiting is over! The New York Rangers are the Stanley Cup Champions! And this one will last a lifetime!"

He was recognized before the Rangers-Islanders game on January 31, 2014, for 30 years of service with the MSG Network. They did a special called "This One Will Last a Lifetime: 30 Years of Sam Rosen", which was announced at intermission as a present to him by longtime partner and longtime friend John Davidson.

Rosen has been told by the Rangers that he can continue in his position as long as he wishes. He has asked his family to inform him if they feel he is losing his edge due to age but is encouraged that Los Angeles Dodgers play-by-play announcer Vin Scully was still considered a top broadcaster when he retired at age 88. He also called national Rangers game on radio.

On August 13, 2024, Rosen announced that he would retire from broadcasting the Rangers after the 2024-25 NHL season, his 40th with the team.

Following Rosen's retirement announcement, Rosen was awarded the Lester Patrick Trophy on October 9, 2024 for outstanding service to hockey in the United States.

His last appearance with the Rangers was serving as host of the Centennial Night celebrations for when the Rangers celebrated their 100th season. He introduced players from the New Garden Era (like his partner for 20 years, John Davidson), the 1994 Stanley Cup Team that have returned (including Mark Messier), and the modern era (featuring fellow MSG Networks studio analyst for four years, Henrik Lundqvist)

=== Other broadcasting areas ===
While still in college Rosen worked in the news department at WINS.

Before taking the Rangers play-by-play job in 1984, Rosen also served as a studio host for New York Knicks basketball telecasts on MSG. By 1975, he was a full-time sportscaster for United Press International's 1000-station radio network ("UPI Audio") and was appointed its Sports Director in 1979. He not only worked a daily morning shift beginning with a 5:45 AM sportscast, but also assigned coverage by UPI's stringers at games in every city with a major league sports franchise, and supervised two junior sportscasters. The first hire he had a hand in was a 20-year-old with no previous full-time professional experience, named Keith Olbermann.

While at UPI, Rosen traveled to and covered most major sporting events, from the Super Bowl to the World Series. The duo covered the 1980 Winter Olympics for UPI, and between them reported all the breaking news coverage and produced a half-hour special report, when Yankees catcher and captain Thurman Munson was killed in a plane crash in August 1979. Even though the UPI position was a full-time responsibility, while he held it Rosen continued his other part-time positions: back-up voice of the Rangers and Knicks on radio and television, Cosmos soccer play-by-play announcer and weekend news anchor on WNEW-AM radio, and spot television boxing assignments for ESPN and USA Network. Olbermann claimed that when he worked for him Rosen held as many as 11 different jobs, while Rosen says he didn't think it was that many but admitted he worked so often that he could easily have forgotten some of them. He left UPI in 1981 when his ESPN workload and compensation became a living wage by itself.

Rosen was employed by ESPN from 1979 to 1988, calling a variety of sports for the network including non-Rangers hockey with Mickey Redmond, college football, boxing, table tennis, Australian rules football, college baseball, collegiate wrestling, and NASL soccer.

He handled play-by-play for NHL Radio, a partnership between the NHL and Westwood One. He has called the Stanley Cup playoffs on the radio for many years, as well as the 2002 and 2006 Winter Olympic Men's Hockey Tournaments. In addition, he has also worked for Versus (now the NBC Sports Network) calling games in the first round of the Stanley Cup Playoffs and 12 Stanley Cup Finals on NHL Radio from 1996 to 2008.

Rosen was a play-by-play announcer for NFL on Fox from 1996 through 2019. He stepped back from full time work with the NFL on FOX after the 2011 season. From 2012 through 2019 he worked a handful of games each season, primarily during the MLB playoffs when regular NFL on FOX announcers were covering baseball. His broadcasting partners have included Heath Evans, Kirk Morrison, Ron Pitts, Ray Bentley, Jerry Glanville, Tim Green, Brady Quinn, Matt Millen, Bill Maas, Brian Billick, Tim Ryan, Ronde Barber, Chad Pennington, Daryl Johnston, Cris Carter, John Lynch and Charles Davis.

Rosen also called preseason NFL games for the Chicago Bears from 2009 to 2017, when he was replaced by Adam Amin, and previously did this for the New York Giants for several seasons.

Rosen was also the lead boxing announcer for the MSG Network until 1993. In 1989, he won the Sam Taub Award for excellence in boxing broadcasting journalism.

Rosen was also a radio play-by-play announcer for the New York Cosmos. His call "It's a Cosmos Goal" predated and could be considered as the basis for his trademark power play call.

| Preceded by Dan Kelly | Stanley Cup Final American network television play-by-play announcer 1986 (with Ken Wilson; Rosen called Games 1-2) | Succeeded by Mike Emrick |
