= Bob Edge =

English footballer

Personal information
- Full name: Robert Richard Edge
- Date of birth: 1872
- Place of birth: Wednesfield, England
- Date of death: 1918 (aged 45–46)
- Position: Winger

Senior career*
Years	Team	Apps	(Gls)
1893–1894	Wolverhampton Wanderers	18	(6)
1894	Loughborough		
1894–1897	Wolverhampton Wanderers	6	(2)
1897	Dudley Road Excelsior		
Total		24	(8)
- * Club domestic league appearances and goals

Robert Richard Edge (1872–1918) was an English footballer who played in the Football League for Wolverhampton Wanderers.
