= Joe Tolleson =

American sports broadcaster

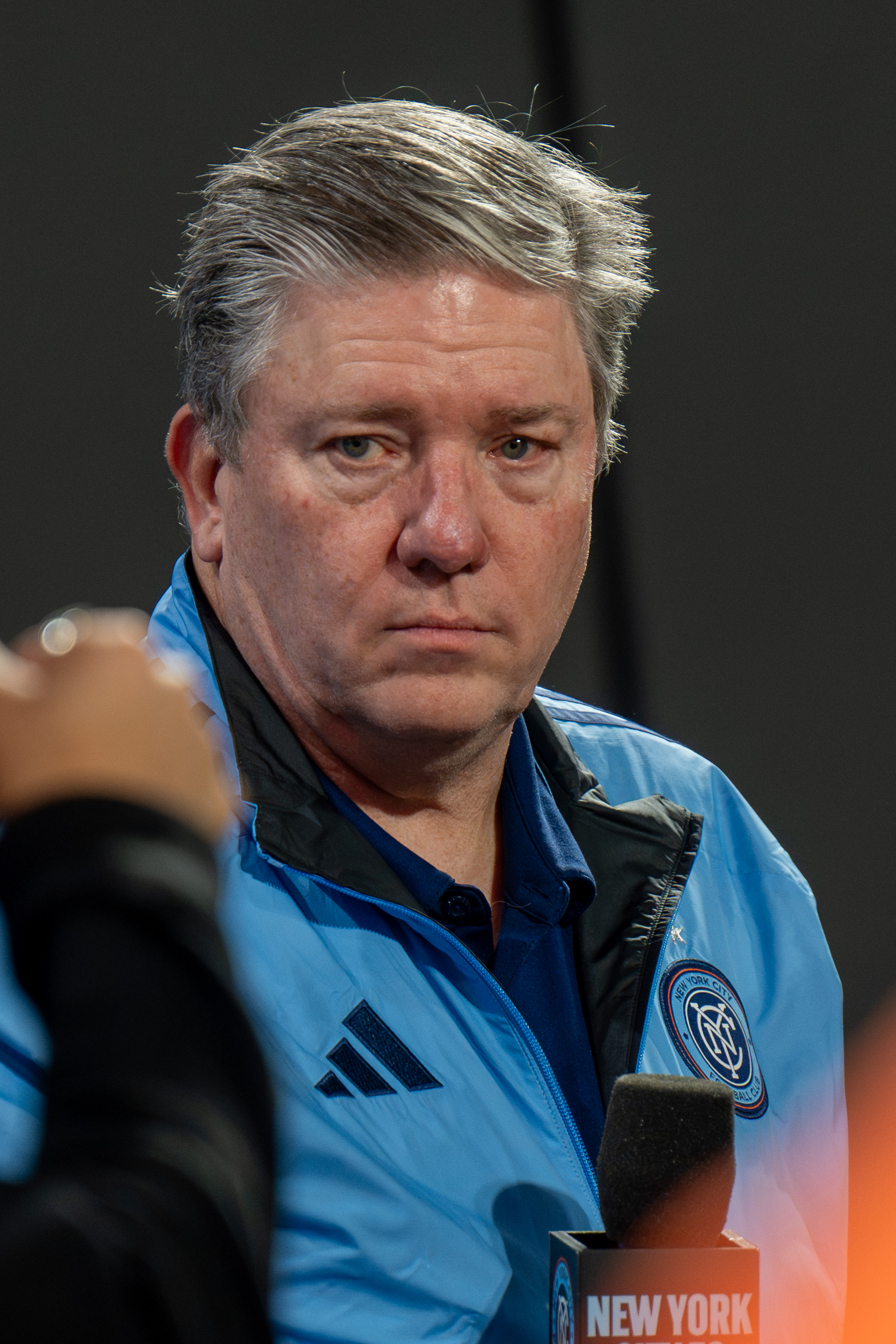
Tolleson during New York City FC vs Inter Miami 24 Sep 2025

Joe Tolleson is an American sports broadcaster. He has been the play-by-play broadcaster for New York City Football Club on the YES Network since their inaugural season in 2015 and the public address announcer for the New York Rangers since 2002.

== Broadcasting career ==
Tolleson currently handles the play-by-play duties on the YES Network's New York City Football Club soccer telecasts as well as PA for the New York Rangers. During his career, he has called gymnastics and soccer for Dial Global's coverage of the 2012 London Olympic games. He is the former voice of the New York Red Bulls. He has worked as a broadcaster for the NHL Radio, MSG, and ESPN International. He has been with Dial Global since 2002 for the Olympics calling ice hockey, swimming, gymnastics, skiing, volleyball, bobsled, luge, Nordic, football, speed skating, and curling. He works for ESPN International calling various soccer leagues including the UEFA Champions League, CONCACAF Champions League, Serie A, La Liga, Eredivisie, and the FA Cup. He has called games for the Hartford Wolf Pack of the American Hockey League, and the New York Power.
