= Sal Marchiano =

American sportscaster

- Born: Salvatore Joseph Marchiano; March 3, 1941 (age 85); Brooklyn, New York, U.S.
- Education: Fordham University
- Occupation: Former sports anchor
- Years active: 1964-2008

Salvatore Joseph "Sal" Marchiano (born March 3, 1941) is a former American sportscaster who worked in New York radio and television for 44 years. In December 2008 he retired from his position as sports director and anchor for the WPIX Channel 11 News At Ten.

A graduate of Fordham University, Marchiano began his sportscasting career in 1964, with the audio operation of United Press International and in local radio, mentored by famed New York sportscaster Marty Glickman.

Marchiano later worked at CBS News, WCBS-TV, WNBC-TV, ESPN, ABC Sports, ABC Radio Network, WABC-TV, WNEW-FM radio and the Mutual Radio Network. His TV debut as sports anchor and reporter for Frank Gifford was at WCBS in 1967, working alongside Jim Jensen, Robert Trout and Reed Collins. Starting in 1971, at WABC-TV, he anchored and reported alongside Howard Cosell and Frank Gifford as well as Roger Grimsby and Bill Beutel. In 1980, he was an original cast member at ESPN anchoring Sportscenter, hosting the weekly Sports Forum and doing the blow-by-blow of the weekly Top Rank Boxing telecasts. In 1984, he joined WNBC-TV and teamed with Chuck Scarborough, Sue Simmons, Gabe Pressman, Marv Albert and Len Berman. Sal moved to WPIX TV in 1994 as sports anchor next to Jack Cafferty and Kaity Tong, for the last fourteen years of his more than four decades broadcasting career.

Marchiano covered major events such as the World Series, the Super Bowl, the NBA playoffs, Stanley Cup playoffs and championship fights. Marchiano hosted ABC's Wide World of Sports live from the Philippines before THE THRILLA IN MANILA. He interviewed the leading sports personalities of his era including Rocky Marciano, Muhammad Ali, Joe Frazier, Vince Lombardi, Joe Namath, Pete Rozelle, Joe DiMaggio, Hank Aaron, Mickey Mantle, Willie Mays, Ted Williams and Billie Jean King. Among his non-sports interviewees were Gene Autry, Federico Fellini, Paul Newman and Frank Sinatra. Sal was awarded two Emmys for broadcasting excellence. His memoir is IN MY REAR VIEW MIRROR. Marchiano's daughter Sam Marchiano, a graduate of Columbia University, has been a sportscaster since the mid-1990s with Fox Sports and Major League Baseball.com. She is a documentarian and social activist.
