= Win Elliot =

American sportscaster (1915–1998)

- Born: Irwin Elliot Shalek; May 7, 1915; Chelsea, Massachusetts, U.S.
- Died: September 17, 1998 (aged 83); Norwalk, Connecticut, U.S.
- Education: University of Michigan
- Occupation: sportscaster
- Years active: 1950s–1980s

Irwin Elliot Shalek (May 7, 1915 – September 17, 1998), better known as Win Elliot, was an American television and radio sportscaster and game show host. He was best known for his long tenures as a play-by-play broadcaster of NHL New York Rangers and NBA New York Knicks games and host of Sports Central USA on the CBS Radio Network.

Elliot was the brother of movie and TV actor Biff Elliot.

== Early life and broadcasting career ==
Elliot was also a game show host in his early career. From 1947 to 1949, he emceed Quick as a Flash, a radio quiz program which featured drama segments with guest actors from radio detective shows. He went on to become a guest host with Beat the Clock and Win with a Winner on television.

In September, 1958, Elliot replaced Jay Jackson as host of the TV version of the formerly popular quiz show Tic-Tac-Dough for the last 13 weeks of its nighttime run. The program was taken off the air amid fallout from the quiz show scandals that had rocked the industry earlier in the year.

== Career heyday ==
The final broadcast of Tic-Tac-Dough on December 29, 1958, also marked the last for Elliot on game shows. Soon he embarked on a full-time sports broadcasting career.

In the mid-1960s, Elliot was the lead voice on "Schaefer Circle of Sports" broadcasts of Rangers and Knicks games, track and field and other events related to Madison Square Garden on WPIX TV and later WOR TV. He also called the 1966 Stanley Cup Finals for NBC, the first televised by an American network.

All the while, Elliot broadcast horse racing events and conducted one of the early call-in sports radio talk shows on WCBS-AM in New York.

Elliot then started anchoring Sports Central USA for CBS Radio, which he continued to do into the early 1980s. He also took part in several of the network's World Series broadcasts in the 1970s and 1980s.

== Later years ==
Elliot died at Norwalk Hospital in Connecticut on September 17, 1998, at the age of 83.

== Notes ==
Preceded by First	Stanley Cup Final American network television play-by-play announcer (with RKO General's Bob Wolff); 1966	Succeeded by Jim Gordon
Preceded by First	Lead play-by-play announcer, NHL on NBC; 1966	Succeeded by Tim Ryan (in 1972)
