= Bertram Lebhar Jr. =

American bridge player and broadcaster

Bertram Lebhar Jr. (1907–1972) was an American bridge player, sportscaster, and radio executive who won the Spingold in 1940 and the Chicago Mixed Board-a-Match in 1946. Lebhar, who used the name Bert Lee on-air, was the radio play-by-play announcer for the New York Rangers from 1939 to 1954.

== Early life ==
Lebhar was born in New York City to magazine editor Bertam Lebhar Sr. and his wife Rose. In 1923 he was awarded a state scholarship to Cornell University. After graduating from Cornell, Lebhar attended New York University Law School, but chose to pass on a legal career in favor of going to radio advertising sales.

== Bridge ==
In 1936, Lebhar and Sam Katz finished third in the Wernher Open Pairs national bridge championship. In 1939, the Blue Ribbon Team of Lebhar, Katz, Oscar Brotman, and Louis Newman made it to the semifinals of the Vanderbilt Trophy tournament, losing to a team led by the trophy's donor, Harold Stirling Vanderbilt. In 1940, Lebhar's team won the Spingold by upsetting a team led by Waldemar von Zedtwitz. In 1941, the Blue Ribbon Team made it to the finals of the Eastern Bridge Tournament, but lost to the Oswald Jacoby-led Regency Club. In 1943, Lebhar was part of the runner-up team at the Reisinger. That same year, Lebhar, Rossant, Katz, & Leventritt were runners-up in the Spingold. In 1945, Lebhar and Rossant were runners up in the Von Zedtwitz Life Master Pairs. In 1946, Lebhar, his wife, Katz, and Alicia Kempner won the Chicago Mixed Board-a-Match competition. In 1946 and 1947, Lebhar was a member of the team that was the runner-up for the Vanderbilt Trophy.

From 1945 to 1947, Lebhar served as treasurer of the American Contract Bridge League. As treasurer, he introduced the practice of charging clubs for the right to issue master points and supported expansion of the league. In 1948, Lebhar donated the Lebhar IMP Pairs trophy in memory of his wife, Evelen. That same year, Lebhar became the founding president of the Greater New York Bridge Association.

=== Bridge accomplishments ===
==== Wins ====
- Spingold 1940
- Chicago Mixed Board-a-Match 1946

=== Runners-up ===
- Wernher Open Pairs 1936
- Reisinger 1943
- Von Zedtwitz Life Master Pairs 1945
- Vanderbilt Trophy 1946, 1947

== Radio career ==
Lebhar began his career with CBS. He then spent four and a half years with WOR. In 1935 he joined WMCA as a vice president. While at WMCA, Lebhar broke into broadcasting when he filled in for an ill sports announcer. In 1939, he became director of sales and a sports announcer for WHN. He was the play-by-play announcer for the New York Rangers from 1939 to 1954 and co-hosted Today's Baseball, where he and Marty Glickman would give play-by-play recreations of the day's best games. In 1949 he became director of the station (then known as WMGM).

From 1957 to 1964 he was general manager of WEAT/WEAT-TV in West Palm Beach, Florida. He was also a part owner from 1957 to 1966. From 1968 to 1970 he operated WXVI.

Lebhar died on April 20, 1972, in West Palm Beach, Florida. He was 65 years old. At the time of his death, Lebhar was residing in Lake Park, Florida.
