= Tim Ryan (sportscaster) =

Canadian-born American sportscaster (born 1939)

- Born: May 16, 1939; Winnipeg, Manitoba, Canada
- Education: University of Notre Dame
- Occupation: Sportscaster
- Employer(s): NBC, CBS, Fox, ESPN
- Spouses: Lee Ryan (m. ?–2002; her death); Patricia
- Children: 4
- Parent: Joe Ryan

Tim Ryan (born May 16, 1939) is a Canadian retired sportscaster who worked for NBC, CBS, Fox, and ESPN in the United States. He was the play-by-play announcer for the NHL on NBC from 1972 to 1975, called over three hundred championship boxing matches, and was a host and play-by-play announcer for Tennis on CBS.

== Early life ==
Ryan was born in Winnipeg and raised in Toronto and attended De La Salle College. His father, Joe, was general manager of the Winnipeg Blue Bombers, Montreal Alouettes, and Edmonton Eskimos of the Canadian Football League and is a member of both the Canadian Football Hall of Fame and Canada's Sports Hall of Fame. In 1956, while attending high school, Ryan got his start in radio at CFRB in Toronto.

== Early career ==
Ryan graduated from the University of Notre Dame with a degree in journalism. He was the sports director of the university's radio station. After graduating, he returned to Toronto and worked as a sportswriter for the Toronto Star. He then joined Toronto TV station CFTO when it launched on January 1, 1961. He was the station's assistant sports director until 1967, when he became the director of public relations for the San Francisco Seals – a Western Hockey League team that joined the National Hockey League the following season as the Oakland Seals. He also served as the team's radio and television play-by-play announcer.

== New York City ==
In 1970, Ryan moved to New York City, where he was a news anchor and sportscaster at WPIX and a play-by-play announcer for the New York Rangers. In 1971, he called the Fight of the Century for Radio New Zealand and the American Forces Network. He was only English-language broadcaster to call the fight live. In 1972, he moved to NBC, joining the network’s sports division and local New York station WNBC. He was the lead announcer for the NHL on NBC from 1972 to 1975, when NBC ended hockey coverage due to poor ratings. Ryan remained with the network as an announcer for NFL games, boxing matches, and other events. From 1975 to 1982, Ryan called games for the New York Islanders alongside George Michael and Ed Westfall.

== CBS ==
Ryan joined CBS in 1977 as a play-by-play announcer for the NBA on CBS, NFL on CBS, and boxing on the CBS Sports Spectacular. In 1982, he began calling college basketball games on CBS. From 1987 to 1994, he was the studio host for CBS' coverage of the US Open tennis tournament. In 1994, he and Jim Nantz became network's tennis play-by-play announcers after the departure of Pat Summerall. Ryan called alpine skiing at the 1992, 1994 and 1998 Olympic Winter Games. From 1996 to 1997, Ryan served as a play-by-play announcer for CBS' coverage of college football.

== Later career ==
In 1998, Ryan moved to Fox, where he was the play-by-play announcer for NFL games and World Bowl '98. In 2003 and 2004, Ryan was a play-by-play announcer for ESPN College Football. He hosted a nightly recap show on SIRIUS radio during the 2006 Wimbledon Championships.

Ryan worked the 2000 Summer Olympics, 2002 Winter Olympics, 2004 Summer Olympics, 2006 Winter Olympics, 2008 Summer Olympics, 2010 Winter Olympics, and 2012 Summer Olympic for NBC, calling equestrian, rowing, flat water canoeing, and alpine skiing.

== Personal life ==
Ryan's first wife, Lee Ryan, was diagnosed with Alzheimer's disease and died in 2002. He was a national board member of the Alzheimer's Association Public Policy Forum for eight years. He is a father of four children.

Ryan's memoir, On Someone Else's Nickel: A Life in Television, Sports, and Travel, was published in 2016.

A longtime resident of Ketchum, Idaho, Ryan moved to Victoria, British Columbia in 2019, where he resides with his second wife, Patricia.

Preceded by Win Elliot (in 1966)	Lead play-by-play announcer, NHL on NBC; 1972-1975	Succeeded by Marv Albert (in 1990)
Preceded by Dan Kelly; Jim Gordon	Stanley Cup Final American network television play-by-play announcer 1972-1975; 1980 (with Dan Kelly; Ryan called the second period of game 6)	Succeeded by Marv Albert and Ted Darling; Bob Cole
