= Les Keiter =

American sportscaster (1919–2009)

- Born: Lester Keiter; April 27, 1919; Seattle, Washington, U.S.
- Died: April 14, 2009 (aged 89); Honolulu, Hawaii, U.S.
- Other name: General
- Education: University of Washington
- Years active: 1956–2009
- Sports commentary career
- Genre: Play-by-play

Lester Keiter (April 27, 1919 – April 14, 2009), also known as the "General", was a newscaster and sports director of Honolulu, Hawaii television station KHON-TV. Keiter, who also lived in New York, Philadelphia and San Francisco, also called some of the biggest fights in the history of boxing.

== Early career ==
Lester Keiter was born and raised in Seattle and graduated from the University of Washington. He began his broadcasting career after World War II when he began announcing for a minor league baseball team.

== During World War II ==
Les Keiter enlisted in the Navy in early 1942. After basic training he became a Yeoman 3rd Class, U.S. Naval Reserve, and was shipped to Honolulu, Hawaii. By August, 1942 Les had been promoted to ensign, and after training was deployed with the 93rd Seebee Battalion towards the Russell Islands, just north of Guadalcanal. Les was reassigned to a communications outfit, bouncing from one Pacific Island to another for over a year, before landing on Peleliu, Palau, where Les ran the Palau Armed Forces Radio Station as the station's manager. The station had a full staff and aired music and news, and Les did sports. He announced boxing matches, had his own show covering baseball, including an exhibition visit and game with the navy All-Stars. Les returned stateside near the end of the war.

== After the war ==
During the 1960s, he called some of the biggest fights in the history of boxing, including the 1964 victory by Muhammad Ali (then Cassius Clay) over heavyweight champ Sonny Liston. Keiter said the Ali-Liston match was the biggest fight he ever called. His frequent partner during boxing events for ABC radio was the late Howard Cosell. Keiter also called the infamous "no MAs" fight between Roberto Duran and Sugar Ray Leonard November 25, 1980 at the Superdome.

Keiter served as sports director at WINS–AM in New York from the mid-1950s to 1963, mainly hosting the pre- and postgame shows for Yankees broadcasts. He also did play-by-play for the football Giants (1956–1959), Knicks (1955–1962) and Rangers. He was most remembered for his re-creations of San Francisco Giants games from 1958 to 1960, broadcast back to New York listeners in the first three seasons after the franchise's departure from the city. His re-creations were so popular, many fans had no idea he was not covering the action live.

Keiter left New York and headed to Philadelphia in 1963, calling games for the Philadelphia 76ers and Big Five college basketball. While broadcasting at the Palestra, Keiter was known for his sign-on phrase, "Welcome to Panicsville, USA,"and also coined phrases such as "ring-tailed howitzer," "tickled the twine" and "in again, out again, Finnegan."

Keiter also covered the 1968 Summer Olympics in Mexico City for Mutual Radio, working with Olympian Jesse Owens, whom Keiter once called the greatest athlete he had ever known. During those Olympics, Keiter called the play-by-play for George Foreman's gold-medal boxing victory.

== KHON-TV sports director ==
In 1970, Keiter and his wife moved to Hawaii. The following year, he was hired as KHON's sports director, where he would stay for over two decades. During Keiter's tenure, he guided many up and coming sportscasters. Fellow KHON sportscaster Ron Mizutani called Keiter his "mentor", saying, "I was a day away from entering the police force. I was his sports producer and he said where you going kid. I said I'm giving up. He said no you're not. Three days later I was his sports reporter." Bob Hogue, another colleague, said about Keiter, "He was the man that I was just so proud to have an opportunity to work with to say you worked with someone who saw alongside some of the greatest athletes in the history of sports."

== "General" Les Keiter ==
Keiter played military generals in two episodes of Hawaii Five-O. Fellow KHON-TV news anchor Joe Moore started calling Keiter "General" as a result of these appearances. Moore recalled thinking, "Oh, I'm going to call him 'General' on the air. I always called him that around the news room, but never on the air. I thought, what the hell. It really took off." Keiter's nickname stuck until he retired from KHON in 1993.

== Post-KHON work ==
After retiring from KHON, Keiter became the spokesman for the Aloha Stadium. Until late 2008, he was also the host of the Honolulu Quarterback Club. In his later years, he reportedly had problems with his vision and difficulty walking. He also reportedly battled dementia in the months preceding his death.

== Death ==
Keiter died on the afternoon of April 14, 2009, surrounded by his family. The KHON-TV web site reported Keiter's death as from natural causes. On April 21, Keiter's family scattered his ashes off Waikiki from a canoe procession.

Keiter was posthumously inducted into the Broadcast Pioneers of Philadelphia Hall of Fame on November 22, 2013.
