= Sal Messina =

American sportscaster

- Born: March 19, 1939 (age 87); New York City, U.S.
- Occupation: Sportscaster
- Years active: 1973–2002

Salvatore "Red Light" Messina (born March 19, 1939) is an American sportscaster who was a color commentator for the New York Rangers of the National Hockey League (NHL). He won the Foster Hewitt Memorial Award in 2005 and is a member of the media section of the Hockey Hall of Fame. He also had a brief amateur hockey career in the Eastern Hockey League as a goaltender.
