= Marv Albert =

American sportscaster (born 1942)

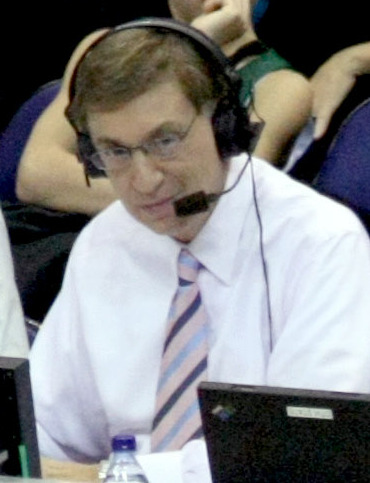
- Albert calling a game for TNT in 2008
- Born: Marvin Philip Aufrichtig; June 12, 1942 (age 84); Brooklyn, New York, U.S.
- Education: Syracuse University; New York University
- Occupation: Sportscaster
- Years active: 1963–2021
- Spouses: Benita Oberlander; Heather Faulkiner
- Children: 4, including Kenny
- Sports commentary career
- Genre: Play-by-play
- Sports: Basketball; American football; ice hockey; boxing

Marv Albert (born Marvin Philip Aufrichtig; June 12, 1942) is an American former sportscaster. Honored for his work by the Basketball Hall of Fame, he was commonly referred to as "the voice of basketball". From 1967 to 2004, he was also known as "the voice of the New York Knicks". Albert was best known nationally for his work as the lead announcer for both the NBA on NBC and NBA games on TNT. In 2015, he was inducted into the Broadcasting Hall of Fame.

In addition to working extensively in both professional and college basketball, he has experience calling a variety of other sports, such as American football, ice hockey, horse racing, boxing, and tennis. Albert has called the play-by-play of eight Super Bowls, nine NBA Finals, and seven Stanley Cup Finals. He has also called the Wimbledon Tennis Championships for TNT with Jim Courier and Mary Carillo and has worked as a co-host and reporter for two World Series (1986 and 1988).

In 1997, Albert was charged with sexually assaulting a woman. He accepted a plea deal, pleading guilty to misdemeanor assault and battery charges, after which NBC fired him. It rehired him less than two years later.

Albert hails from a family of broadcasters. His brothers, Al and Steve Albert, and a son, Kenny, are also play-by-play sports commentators.

== Early life ==
Albert was born to a Jewish family in Brooklyn, New York City, where he went to Abraham Lincoln High School. His family members owned a grocery store on Brighton Beach Avenue between 3rd and 4th Streets known as Aufrichtig. He attended Syracuse University's Newhouse School of Public Communications from 1960 through 1963. In 1962, he served as the voice of the AAA Syracuse Chiefs. He graduated from New York University in 1965.

== Broadcasting career ==
=== National Basketball Association ===
After getting his start by being a ball boy for the New York Knicks, Albert worked his first Knicks game as a broadcaster on January 27, 1963, on WCBS Radio. He was filling in for his mentor, Marty Glickman, who was away in Europe. The game was against the Celtics at the Boston Garden. Beginning in 1967 and lasting 37 years, Albert served as the voice of the New York Knicks on radio and television before being let go by James L. Dolan, the chairman of the MSG Network and Cablevision, after Albert criticized the team's poor play on-air in 2004. It was said that Albert's high salary was also a factor. His son, Kenny Albert, has been a part-time play-by-play announcer for the Knicks since 2009, filling in whenever the elder Albert's successor, Mike Breen, is unavailable.

==== NBC Sports ====
Albert was the lead play-by-play announcer for the NBA on NBC for most of its run from 1990 to 2002, calling every NBA Finals during that timeframe except for 1998, 1999, and 2000, which were called by Bob Costas in the wake of Albert's arrest for sexual assault. Albert resumed his previous position for the 2000–2001 season and called Game 4 of the 2002 NBA Finals, which was the final NBA telecast on NBC. During his time on NBC, he continued as the lead play-by-play man for the New York Knicks on local MSG Network telecasts and began calling national games for TNT in 1999, as well. When he regained the lead broadcaster position on NBC, he continued to call play-by-play for both networks until the end of NBC's coverage in 2002.

==== TNT ====
Albert continued to be the lead play-by-play announcer for NBA games on TNT, a position he assumed in 1999. Indeed, TNT had become his primary commitment ever since his longtime employer NBC lost the NBA broadcasting rights in 2002 to ABC and ESPN, which may have played a role in his departure from the Knicks' broadcast booth. The Knicks reportedly wanted Albert to accept a salary commensurate with his reduced Knicks schedule but also weren't happy about Albert making what Knicks management felt were overly critical comments about their team despite their losing record.

In basketball, his most famous call is his simple "Yes!" for a basket, rendered in many variations of volume and length depending on the situation.

On April 17, 2002, shortly after calling a game between the Indiana Pacers and Philadelphia 76ers on TNT, both Albert and color commentator Mike Fratello were injured in a limo accident in Trenton, New Jersey. Albert sustained facial lacerations, a concussion, and a sprained ankle. The 2002 NBA Playoffs was set to begin two days later, with Albert scheduled to call multiple games that week. Bob Costas filled in for those games, and Albert returned to call Game 1 of the Western Conference Semifinals between the Dallas Mavericks and Sacramento Kings.

On May 15, 2021, it was reported that Albert had planned on retiring following the 2021 NBA playoffs. The news became official two days later. His last game called was Game 6 of the 2021 NBA Eastern Conference Finals, between the Milwaukee Bucks and Atlanta Hawks.

==== New Jersey Nets (YES) ====
In 2005, Albert officially became the lead play-by-play man for the New Jersey Nets franchise started calling their games on the YES Network, often teaming with Brooklyn native and NBA veteran Mark Jackson. With that, the Nets had employed all three Albert brothers during the franchise's history; Al started his broadcast career with the Nets during their ABA days, while Steve called Nets games during the late 1970s and 1980s. Beginning with the 2008–09 season, he was also paired with his TNT broadcast colleague Mike Fratello on the YES Network. However, with the Nets' struggles in the 2009–10 season, Nets management relegated Albert to secondary play-by-play and was replaced by Ian Eagle. In 2011, Albert left the YES Network to join CBS Sports for NFL and NCAA tournament coverage.

==== Other basketball-related ventures ====
Albert hosts a basketball-focused interview show on NBA TV, which also airs on YES.

Albert also hosted the Dazzling Dunks and Basketball Bloopers VHS tape by NBA Entertainment in 1988.

Since 2003, Albert has also been providing the play-by-play voice on the NBA Live video-game series from EA Sports, a role he fulfilled until NBA Live 10.

From 2011 to 2015, Albert announced NCAA Men's Division I Basketball Championship tournament games, the result of longtime tournament broadcaster CBS handing off some of its coverage to Turner Sports.

In February 2016, Albert and Turner Sports announced that he would no longer call NCAA Tournament basketball games, stating that calling four games in one day during the first round, and a total of six matches in three days during the first two rounds, was too much for his 74-year-old voice to handle. Albert said that he "felt it was the wiser move to go primarily NBA at this stage."

In 2022, Albert appeared in the Playoffs on NBA Lane short film alongside ESPN sideline reporter Malika Andrews.

=== Outside basketball ===
==== New York Rangers ====
In addition to the Knicks, Albert had a lengthy tenure (beginning in 1965) calling the games of another Madison Square Garden tenant, the New York Rangers. He handled the radio call of the Rangers' Stanley Cup-clinching victory in 1994.

He also famously coined the nickname "Red Light" for radio analyst Sal Messina, a former Rangers goaltender. His signature play-by-play phrase was "kick save and a beauty."

Over his years as the Rangers' broadcaster, Albert missed a large number of games for other commitments. Many other broadcasters filled in, including several who later served long stints for other NHL teams, including Howie Rose, Mike Emrick, and John Kelly, as well as Albert's brothers Al and Steve. It was his absence from Game 7 of the Rangers–Devils Eastern Conference Finals game that led to Rose's famed Matteau, Matteau, Matteau call.

Albert left the Rangers after the 1994–95 season. At the same time, Rose took the job as a play-by-play announcer of the New York Islanders. Albert's son, Kenny, replaced him and had been the radio voice of the Rangers until being promoted to the television role for the 2025-26 NHL season. Kenny also calls NHL and Olympic ice hockey for NBC Sports and has served as the national radio voice of the Stanley Cup Finals since 2016.

==== New York Giants ====
From 1973 to 1976, Albert called radio broadcasts of New York Giants football games, succeeding Marty Glickman after the latter started broadcasting for the New York Jets.

==== Monday Night Football ====
Albert was also the lead play-by-play voice of the Westwood One radio network's NFL coverage from the 2002 to the 2009 seasons, calling Monday Night Football as well as numerous playoff games and every Super Bowl from 2003 to 2010. On June 4, 2010, it was announced that Albert was leaving his NFL on Westwood One duties. He was succeeded by Kevin Harlan.

==== NFL on CBS ====
On June 6, 2011, it was announced Albert was joining CBS Sports to call play-by-play for The NFL on CBS. Albert was usually teamed with Rich Gannon on broadcasts.

On May 29, 2014, Albert stepped down from calling The NFL on CBS to focus more on his basketball duties for TNT and CBS.

==== Other network duties ====
Other NBC Sports duties included play-by-play announcing for the NFL (by 1983, Albert was the No. 2 play-by-play man behind Dick Enberg, usually alternating the secondary NFL role year to year with Don Criqui), college basketball (teaming with Bucky Waters on Big East/ECAC games), horse racing, boxing (often working with Ferdie Pacheco and subsequently, Sugar Ray Leonard when NBC relaunched boxing under the Premier Boxing Champions umbrella), NHL All-Star Games (Albert called the NHL All-Star Game with John Davidson on NBC from 1990 to 1994), and Major League Baseball, as well as hosting baseball studio and pre-game shows (including NBC's coverage of the 1986 and 1988 World Series alongside Bob Costas). He also spent 13 years as the sports director of the network's flagship station, WNBC-TV, in New York.

Albert also called regular-season and playoff NHL games for the syndicated NHL Network in the 1976–77 season, and, from 2000 to 2002, he helped call TNT's coverage of the Wimbledon Championships tennis tournament.

=== In popular culture ===
Albert made 53 guest appearances on David Letterman's late-night talk show for NBC and CBS. Each time Albert appeared, he brought with him a group of clips featuring sports bloopers and outstanding plays, which he narrated and dubbed the "Albert Achievement Awards". The music accompanying the bloopers was "Twelfth Street Rag".

Albert was placed as No. 14 on David J. Halberstam's list of Top 50 All-Time Network Television Sports Announcers on Yahoo! Sports.

He appears on "Perfect Sense, Part II", on Roger Waters' 1992 album, Amused to Death, commentating on a military attack in the manner of a sports report.

Albert's voice is imitated in the popular video game NBA Jam. The announcer was modeled on Albert, although there is no mention of Albert in the game and the announcer was actually voiced by Tim Kitzrow.

Jack Black and his bandmate Kyle Gass derived the name of their band 'Tenacious D' from a term used by Albert to describe the tenacious defense of the New York Knicks in 1994.

=== Honors and awards ===
- Cable ACE Award – six times.
- Curt Gowdy Media Award – awarded by the Naismith Memorial Basketball Hall of Fame, 1997.
- American Sportscasters Association Sportscaster of the Year (Play-by-Play) – 1996.
- Emmy Award – for national sports: five times; for New York: three times.
- National Jewish Museum Sports Hall of Fame – inducted in 1992.
- New York State Sportscaster of the Year – twenty times.
- National Sportscasters and Sportswriters Association Hall of Fame – inducted in 2014.
- WAER Hall of Fame – inducted in 2017.

== Sexual assault ==
Albert was accused of sexually assaulting a 42-year-old woman in 1997. The woman accused Albert of throwing her onto a bed, biting her, then forcing her to perform oral sex after a February 12, 1997 argument in his Pentagon City hotel room. DNA testing linked Albert to genetic material taken from the bite marks and from semen in her underwear. During the trial, another woman, Patricia Masden, testified that Albert had bitten her on two separate occasions, in Miami in 1993 and in Dallas in 1994, which she viewed as unwanted sexual advances. Masden, a VIP liaison for Hyatt Hotels, claimed that Albert called her to help him send a fax from his Dallas hotel room, where she found him wearing "white panties and garter belt". Albert's defense team said that the judge blocked most of what they wanted to bring to trial in Albert's defense, prompting them to accept a plea deal from the prosecutors. Albert pleaded guilty to misdemeanor assault and battery charges, while a felony charge of forcible sodomy was dropped. He was given a 12-month suspended sentence. The conviction was expunged from his record a year later, in accordance with the terms of his sentencing. In an interview with Barbara Walters, Albert maintained that his accuser had requested he bite her. He also denied her accusation that he had requested she bring another man into their sexual affair. He described her recorded conversation with the police on the night of the incident as "an Academy Award performance".

NBC – for which Albert worked for over 20 years – fired him hours after he entered his guilty plea. His last NFL broadcast for NBC before being fired was the 1997 Baltimore Ravens–New York Giants game alongside Randy Cross and Len Berman. Bob Costas took over for Albert on NBA on NBC in the 1997–98 NBA season. Tom Hammond eventually moved up to the #2 team (behind Dick Enberg, Paul Maguire, and Phil Simms). NBC rehired Albert less than two years after firing him, with Chairman of NBC Sports Dick Ebersol stating that, "Marv has done what he had to do" since being fired.

== Broadcasting partners ==
- John Andariese
- Butch Beard
- Bill Chadwick
- Chip Cipolla
- Doug Collins
- Cris Collinsworth
- John Davidson
- Boomer Esiason
- Mike Fratello
- Walt Frazier
- Rich Gannon
- Richie Guerin
- Matt Guokas
- Grant Hill
- Sam Huff
- Magic Johnson
- Steve "Snapper" Jones
- Steve Kerr
- Dick Lynch
- Al McGuire
- Paul Maguire
- Kevin McHale
- Sal Messina
- Reggie Miller
- Earl Monroe
- Ferdie Pacheco
- Bill Parcells
- Cal Ramsey
- Bob Trumpy
- Jeff Van Gundy
- Bill Walton
- Bucky Waters
- Chris Webber
- Sam Wyche

== Career timeline ==
Year	Title	Role	Network
1967–1997; 2000–2004	New York Knicks	Play-by-play	MSG Network
1969–1988	College Basketball on NBC	Play-by-play	NBC
1973–1977	New York Giants	Play-by-play (radio)	WNEW
1976–1977	NHL Network	Play-by-play	HTN
1977–1997	NFL on NBC	Play-by-play	NBC
1979–1989	Major League Baseball on NBC	Host; Play-by-play (backup)	NBC
1984–1990	NBA on TBS	Play-by-play	TBS
1989–1994	NHL on NBC	Play-by-play (lead)	NBC
1990–1997; 2000–2002	NBA on NBC	Play-by-play (lead)	NBC
1999–2021	NBA on TNT	Play-by-play (lead)	TNT
2000–2002	Tennis on TNT	Play-by-play	TNT
2002–2009	Monday Night Football	Play-by-play (radio)	CBS Sports Radio
2005–2011	New Jersey Nets	Play-by-play	YES Network
2011–2015	NCAA March Madness	Play-by-play	CBS/TNT/TBS
2011–2014	NFL on CBS	Play-by-play	CBS

Media offices
Preceded by Bob Wolff (in 1962)	Lead play-by-play announcer, NBA on NBC; 1990–1997	Succeeded by Bob Costas
Preceded by Bob Costas	Lead play-by-play announcer, NBA on NBC; 2000–2002	Succeeded by Mike Tirico (in 2025)
Preceded by Dick Stockton	Play-by-play announcer, NBA Finals; 1991–1997	Succeeded by Bob Costas
Preceded by Bob Costas	Play-by-play announcer, NBA Finals; 2001–2002	Succeeded by Brad Nessler
Preceded by Howard David	Monday Night Football national radio play-by-play announcer 2002–2009	Succeeded by Kevin Harlan
Preceded by Tim Ryan	Stanley Cup Final American network television play-by-play announcer 1976 (with Ted Darling; Albert called Games 1, 3-4)	Succeeded by Dan Kelly
Preceded by Tim Ryan (in 1975)	Lead play-by-play announcer, NHL on NBC; 1990–1994	Succeeded by Mike Emrick (in 2005)
Preceded by Bill Macatee	Major League Baseball: An Inside Look host 1986–1989	Succeeded by Last
