= Chip Cipolla =

American radio announcer

- Born: Frank Cipolla; August 24, 1926; The Bronx, New York, U.S.
- Died: July 10, 1994 (aged 67); Manhattan, New York, U.S.
- Education: Fordham University
- Occupation: Radio announcer

Frank "Chip" Cipolla (August 24, 1926 – July 10, 1994) was an American radio announcer for the New York Football Giants and other professional sports teams in the New York City area.

Cipolla was born in the Bronx, the son of Italian-Americans Henry Cipolla and Rose DiSanto Cipolla. He had a sister, Gloria Rocks. Has a daughter Nancy Lynn Cipolla (Harrington)

A graduate of Fordham University, class of 1950, Cipolla worked for 19 years at WNEW Radio. From 1960 to 1965 he served as the station's sports editor. He was a color commentator for the Giants, as part of the broadcasting team that included Marty Glickman, Al DeRogatis and Kyle Rote. He was also a regular on WNEW's highly rated morning program, Klavan & Finch. On November 9, 1965, WNEW pressed Cipolla into duty as a street reporter during the Northeastern blackout, reporting from various Manhattan locations much of the night. Cipolla later did the morning news on the Jay Thomas Show on 92.3 WKTU in New York in the early 80's.

He later broadcast games of the New York Mets, New York Rangers, New Jersey Nets and New York Cosmos, the North American Soccer League team which presented him with a 1972 championship ring.

Cipolla was inducted into the Fordham University Athletics Hall of Fame in 1981.

Cipolla died of cancer at Lenox Hill Hospital, aged 67.
