= WINS (AM) =

All-news radio station in New York City

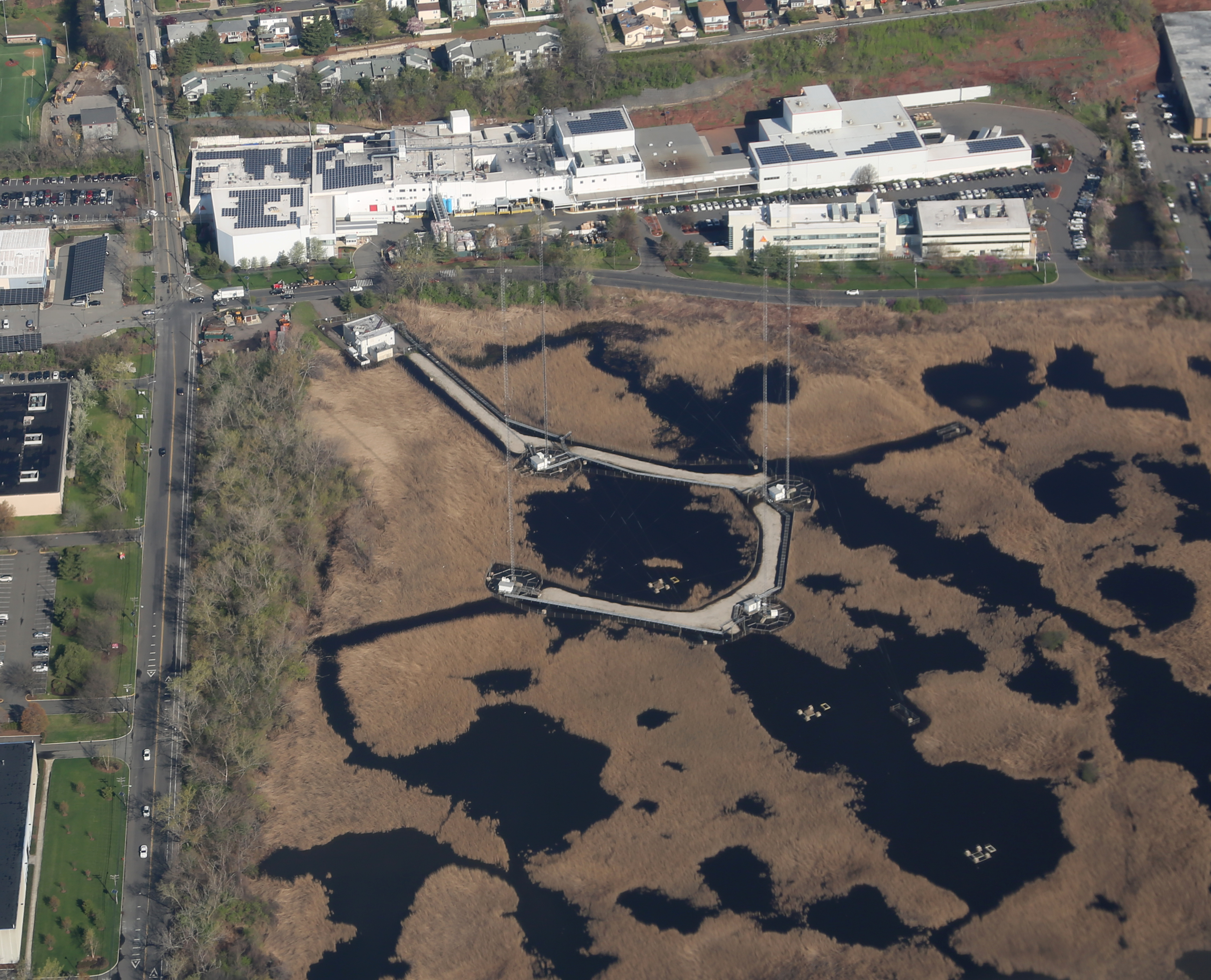
- 1010 WINS transmitter site in Lyndhurst, New Jersey
- New York, New York; United States
- Broadcast area: New York metropolitan area
- Frequency: 1010 kHz
- Branding: 1010 WINS

Programming
- Language: English
- Format: All-news radio
- Affiliations: ABC News Radio; Associated Press; Bloomberg Radio

Ownership
- Owner: Audacy, Inc.; (Audacy License, LLC)
- Sister stations: WCBS-FM; WFAN; WFAN-FM; WHSQ; WINS-FM; WNEW-FM; WXBK

History
- First air date: October 24, 1924
- Former call signs: WGBS (1924–1934)
- Former frequencies: 950 kHz (1924–1927); 860 kHz (1927–1930); 600 kHz (1930–1931); 1180 kHz (1931–1941); 1000 kHz (1941–1944)
- Call sign meaning: named for onetime owner Hearst Newspapers' International News Service

Technical information
- Licensing authority: FCC
- Facility ID: 25451
- Class: B
- Power: 50,000 watts
- Transmitter coordinates: 40°48′14.36″N 74°06′22.51″W
- Repeater: 92.3 WINS-FM (New York)

Links
- Public license information: Public file; LMS
- Webcast: Listen live (via Audacy); Listen live (via iHeartRadio)
- Website: www.audacy.com/1010wins

WINS (1010 kHz) is a commercial, all-news AM radio station licensed to New York, New York owned by Audacy, Inc. The station brands itself "1010 WINS" with its call sign phonetically pronounced as "wins". WINS's studios are located in the combined Audacy facility in the Hudson Square neighborhood in Lower Manhattan, and its transmitter is located in Lyndhurst, New Jersey.

WINS is the oldest continuously operating all-news station in the United States, having adopted the format on April 19, 1965, under former owner Westinghouse Broadcasting, and until August 26, 2024, was one of two all-news stations in the New York City market operating under the same ownership, WCBS (880 AM) being the other. The station's nighttime signal, via ionosphere skywave propagation, reaches much of the eastern half of North America.

WINS formerly broadcast in the HD Radio (hybrid) format. As of October 27, 2022, WINS is simulcasting on WINS-FM (92.3 FM).

== History ==
The station began broadcasting on October 24, 1924, on 950 kHz as WGBS, with studios located in Gimbels Department Store near Herald Square; the call sign was an initialism for Gimbel Brothers Store. WGBS moved to 860 kHz in 1927, to 1180 kHz in 1928, to 600 kHz in 1929, and back to 1180 kHz in 1931.

The station was bought by William Randolph Hearst in 1932. That same year, effective January 15, it adopted its present call sign, named after Hearst's International News Service. No longer owned by Gimbels, WINS relocated to the Hotel Lincoln on 8th Avenue. On June 19, 1932, it moved to the WINS Building, 114 East 58th Street.

WINS changed its frequency from 1180 kHz to 1000 kHz on March 29, 1941, as part of the North American Regional Broadcasting Agreement (NARBA), and moved again to 1010 kHz in 1944. Cincinnati-based Crosley Broadcasting Corporation announced its purchase of the station from Hearst in 1945 for $1,700,000, though it would be over a year before Crosley would take control of WINS, in July 1946.

Sportscaster Mel Allen was an early disc jockey on the station, hosting an afternoon popular music program beginning in 1947.

=== Rock and roll (1953–1965) ===
Crosley sold the station to J. Elroy McCaw's Gotham Broadcasting Corporation in 1953 for $450,000. Soon after, WINS became one of the first stations in the United States to play rock and roll music full time. In the fall of 1954, Alan Freed was hired as a disc jockey on WINS. In 1958, Murray "the K" Kaufman joined as the all-night DJ, naming his show the Swingin' Soiree. Noted sports broadcaster Les Keiter served as sports director for a period in the 1950s. Keiter is perhaps best remembered for his recreations of San Francisco (formerly New York) Giants baseball games, which WINS carried in 1958 to keep disconnected Giant fans in touch with their team. The Giants had moved west along with the Brooklyn Dodgers the previous year.

In the late 1950s and early 1960s, as the transistor radio became popular, especially with young people who could carry radios with them everywhere, rock and roll solidified as a genre, thanks in large measure to what became known as Top 40 radio. In New York, four stations battled in the category: WMCA (570 AM), WMGM (1050 AM), WABC (770 AM), and WINS. While WMCA was only 5,000 watts, it was at the bottom end of the dial, which gave it better coverage than might be expected for its power; the other three were all 50,000 watts, but only WABC was both non-directional and a clear channel station. Of those three, WINS was the most directional (aimed straight at New York's inner boroughs), with a weaker signal than the others toward the New Jersey suburbs (primarily to protect 50,000 watt CFRB in Toronto, Canada, which is also on 1010) and the Jersey Shore.

In 1962, WMGM adopted a beautiful music format under its previous call letters, WHN, while WINS was purchased by the Westinghouse Electric Corporation. On April 18, 1965, around 8:00 pm, WINS bowed out of Top 40 competition with the song "Out in the Streets", by The Shangri-Las. WMCA enjoyed some early success after WINS and WMGM left the Top 40 format, but WABC became the dominant Top 40 station in New York City by 1965.

=== "All news. All the time." (1965–present) ===
Logo before simulcasting on 92.3

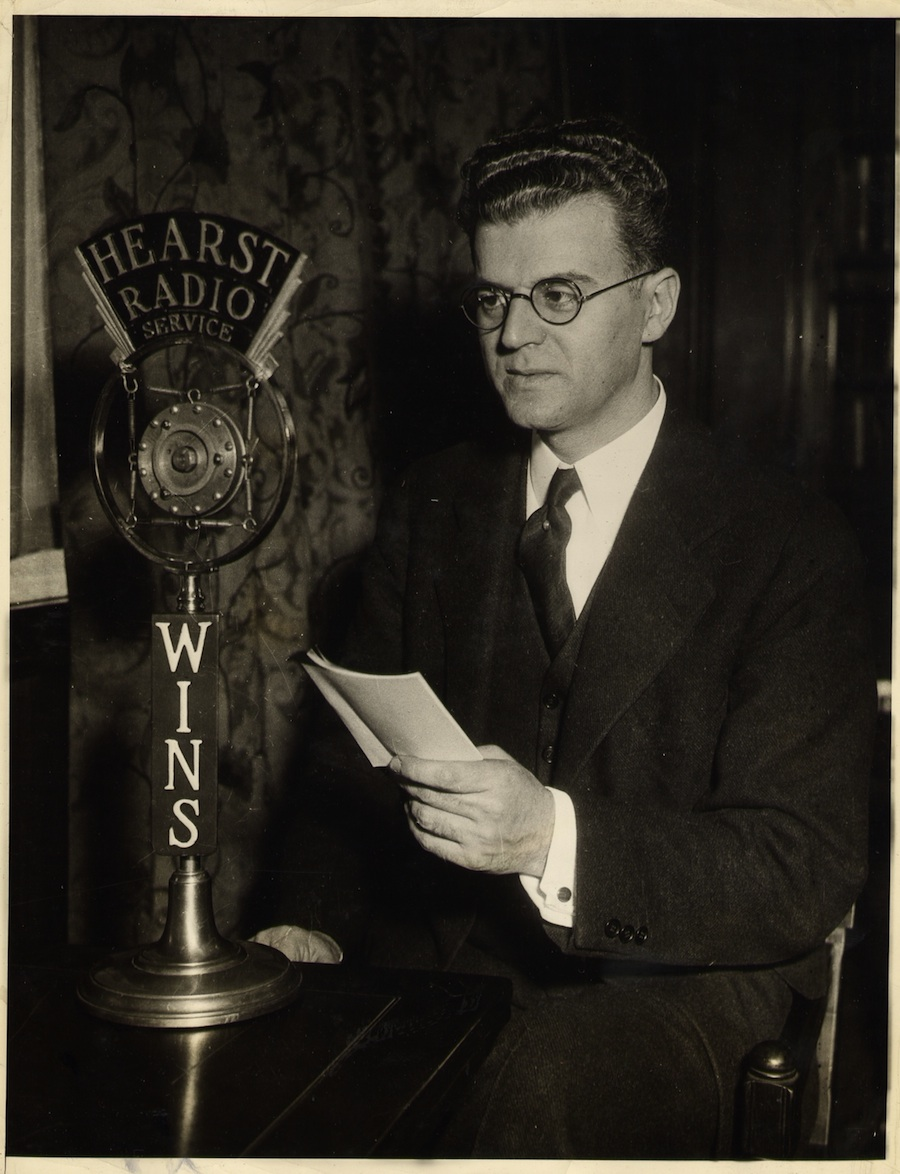
Louis Israel Newman reading a story for WINS, c. 1930s

On April 19, 1965, after weeks of speculation, WINS changed its format radically. It became the third radio station in the United States to attempt all-news programming, going with the new format around the clock. WINS immediately established a template for its format with an easily identifiable, distinctive teletype sound in the background, which for many years was from a live microphone behind their bank of newswire machines. Most other all-news stations later dropped this, but WINS continued to use a teletype sound effect despite teletype machines becoming obsolete by the mid-1980s. The teletype sound effect was eventually dropped by the late 2010s. WINS used memorable slogans such as "All news, all the time"; "The newswatch never stops"; "Listen two, three, four times a day"; and "You give us 22 minutes, we'll give you the world"; the latter tagline was a reference to WINS's format clock, which returns to the top stories every twenty minutes.

WINS's switch to all-news was initially viewed as a risky programming choice. Tijuana, Mexico-based border blaster XETRA had programmed an English-language all-news format for the Los Angeles radio market, as had Chicago station WNUS and, previously WAVA AM and FM in the Washington, D.C. area. Locally, WABC-FM aired a news format for several weeks during the 1962–63 New York City newspaper strike. None of the other attempts were successful, and as a result many in the radio industry predicted a quick demise for WINS, however, Westinghouse Broadcasting supported the format and WINS eventually prospered with it. Westinghouse made similar format changes at two other stations: KYW in Philadelphia, in September 1965; and KFWB in Los Angeles, in March 1968. Together, WINS, KFWB and KYW served as prototype all-news stations, and all three succeeded in attracting both listeners and advertising revenue over the years.

In 1995, Westinghouse Electric purchased CBS, a move which put WINS under common ownership with WCBS. Despite initial speculation after the merger that either station would drop the all-news format, both stations remained in place until August 2024.

WINS's signal was also improved in 1995 after the company bought KSYG in Little Rock, Arkansas, which had also broadcast on the same frequency, and took it off the air. This relieved WINS of the need to "null" its signal in the direction of Little Rock. WINS' towers in Lyndhurst, New Jersey, which were shorter than optimum for its frequency, were replaced with four taller ones. While the signal is still directional to protect other stations, such as CFRB in Toronto (itself a Class A station), the signal no longer has to protect Little Rock.

WINS maintained an affiliation with ABC News Radio throughout, while WCBS served as the CBS Radio News affiliate for New York until Audacy struck an agreement with Good Karma Brands to change its format to sports talk radio and serve as a secondary ESPN Radio affiliate to WEPN (AM). WINS added a secondary affiliation with Westwood One News on January 1, 2015, after Westwood One ended a distribution deal with ABC News.

On February 2, 2017, CBS Radio announced it would merge with Entercom (now Audacy, Inc.), which fully separated WINS and WCBS radio from WCBS-TV. The merger was approved on November 9, 2017, and was consummated on November 17, 2017.

On October 10, 2022, it was announced that Audacy would flip sister station WNYL (92.3 FM) from its alternative format to a simulcast of WINS effective October 27; Audacy also concurrently announced that, after a deal was reached with the SAG-AFTRA union, it was planning on combining the separate staffs and newsrooms of WINS and WCBS. Along with the launch of the simulcast, WINS' simulcast on WNEW-FM's HD3 sub-channel was dropped.

=== Influence ===
CBS was the first broadcaster to make an attempt to mimic Westinghouse's all-news formula. Locally in New York, WINS' success as an all-news station spurred CBS to make a similar transformation with WCBS in August 1967. At first, WCBS did not go full-time with all-news, offering other programming during late nights, but joined WINS in broadcasting all-news around the clock by 1970. After completing the conversion of WCBS to all-news, five of CBS' other owned-and-operated AM stations also adopted the format; WCAU in Philadelphia and KNX in Los Angeles competed directly against KYW and KFWB, but with varying results.

In 1975, NBC Radio tried a national all-news approach with its News and Information Service (NIS) network, but it was shut down in 1977 after only two years in operation. In the mid-1970s, Westinghouse's second Chicago station, WIND, carried the format part-time while competing against CBS-owned, all-news WBBM. WIND was not successful, and Westinghouse tried again after selling WIND in 1985 and acquiring WMAQ from NBC in 1988. Westinghouse converted WMAQ into a full-time news outlet with mixed results.

In the summer of 2011, New York would gain a third all-news station, this one on the FM dial, in WEMP's FM News 101.9. In the wake of meager ratings, the format abruptly flipped back to the alternative rock format that had been on the frequency three years prior. Later in 2012, Merlin Media, LLC sold the frequency to CBS Radio, which turned it into an FM simulcast of WFAN, making it a sister station to both WINS and WCBS.

As of 2024, Audacy operates six all-news stations around the U.S., including WINS, WBBM, KNX, KYW, KCBS in San Francisco, and WWJ in Detroit. (WBZ in Boston had also been a Westinghouse/CBS all-news outlet until CBS Radio's merger with Entercom in November 2017 forced WBZ to be spun off to iHeartMedia to meet FCC ownership limits and concerns from the Department of Justice).

== See also ==
- CBS News Radio
