= Marty Glickman =

American sports announcer (1917–2001)

- Glickman in the booth above the old Giants Stadium in New Jersey
- Born: Martin Irving Glickman; August 14, 1917; New York City, U.S.
- Died: January 3, 2001 (aged 83); New York City, U.S.
- Education: Syracuse University
- Occupation: Radio sportscaster
- Known for: 1936 Berlin Olympics
- Spouse: Marjorie Glickman
- Children: 4

Martin Irving Glickman (August 14, 1917 – January 3, 2001) was an American athlete, who later worked as a radio announcer. He is well known as a member of the broadcasts of the New York Knicks basketball games, the football games of the New York Giants and the New York Jets.

Glickman was a noted track and field athlete and football star at Syracuse University. He was a member of the U.S. team at the 1936 Summer Olympic Games held in Berlin, Germany. The unexplained, last-minute decision to remove Glickman and Sam Stoller—a fellow Jewish American athlete—from the 100-meter relay at the 1936 Olympics, where they were replaced by Jesse Owens and Ralph Metcalfe, who won the gold medal, has been widely viewed as an American effort to avoid embarrassing or offending Adolf Hitler, then the Chancellor of Germany, who had been directing anti-Jewish discriminatory policies since 1933. Glickman would later talk and write extensively about the controversial decision. James L. Freedman has produced a documentary film, Glickman, that was broadcast nationally in the United States on HBO in 2013.

== Early life and education ==
Glickman was born in the Bronx, New York City, to a Romanian Jewish family. His parents, Harry and Molly Glickmann, had migrated to the United States from Iaşi, Romania.

He was a track star and football standout at James Madison High School in Brooklyn and at Syracuse University.

== Track career and the 1936 Berlin Olympics ==
Glickman was an 18-year-old sprinter who qualified for the U.S. team in the 1936 Summer Olympics in Berlin, Germany. Glickman traveled to Germany and spent two weeks practicing as part of the 400-meter relay team. However, on the morning of the day that they were scheduled to compete, Glickman and Sam Stoller (also Jewish) were replaced on the 4 × 100 m relay team by Ralph Metcalfe and Jesse Owens. Foy Draper and Frank Wykoff, the two other runners with whom they'd been practicing, remained on the relay team. The U.S. team won the event by fifteen yards. It is generally thought that the relay team would have won fairly easily without the substitution of Glickman and Stoller, who were the only two members of the U.S. Olympic team who did not compete after arriving in Berlin. During the entire history of U.S. participation in the Olympic Games, it is extremely rare that uninjured team members don't compete in any event at all, and indeed after practice trials, Glickman and Stoller had been assured that they would be running in the relay event.

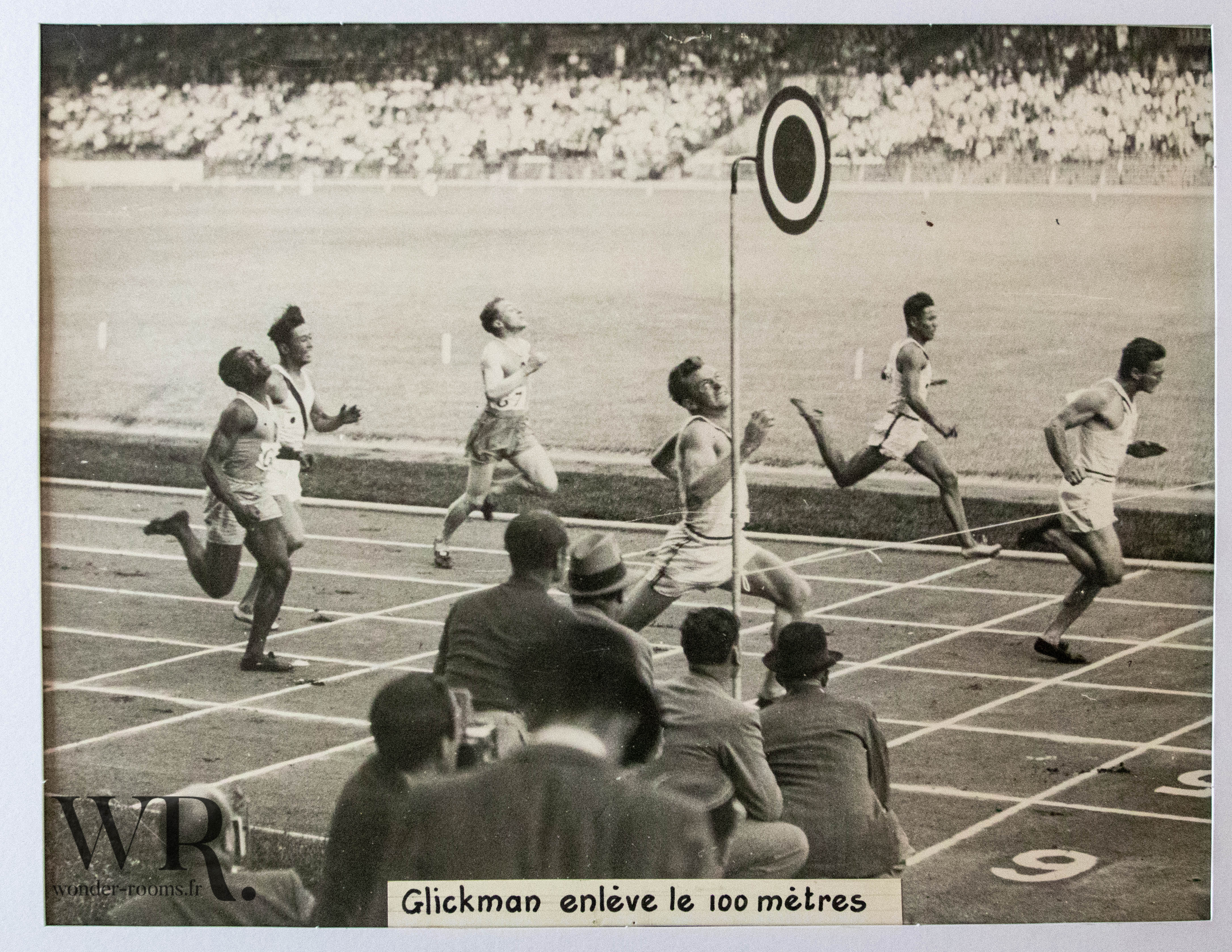
Glickman running a relay in Paris in 1938

No written sources have ever emerged that conclusively account for the last-minute decision to remove Glickman and Stoller from the relay event. Glickman himself was convinced that their removal was done primarily to avoid embarrassing Adolf Hitler, the chancellor of Germany, and the National Socialist (Nazi) regime he led. Under Hitler's leadership, Germany had enacted severe anti-Jewish race laws, and the profound prejudice of the National Socialist regime against Jews was obvious by 1936. With the two Jewish sprinters, an American team's victory in the relay would have been awkward for the German hosts to the games in Berlin, their capital city. The head of the 1936 US Olympic Team, Avery Brundage, dismissed these allegations as "absurd" in a written report shortly after the games, but David Large wrote more than seventy years later that "While the removal of Glickman and Stoller never bothered Brundage, it haunted the American Olympic establishment for decades after."

In 1998, the then-president of the U.S. Olympic Committee, William J. Hybl, honored Glickman and the memory of Sam Stoller, who had died in 1985, by presenting Glickman with a plaque "in lieu of the gold medals they didn't win" in Berlin. Hybl noted that although there was no written proof that their removal was an appeasement of the German regime's anti-Semitism, it was clearly the case. "I was a prosecutor," Hybl said. "I'm used to looking at evidence. The evidence was there."

For having been pulled from the relay, Glickman blamed Brundage and track coach Dean Cromwell. According to Glickman, Cromwell favored Draper and Wykoff over Glickman and Stoller for two reasons, the coach's anti-Semitism and his favoring Wykoff and Draper because they ran for Cromwell at USC. Glickman thought Brundage was an anti-Semite and did too much to please Hitler.

As a testament to Glickman's ability as a sprinter in 1963 (at age 46) he lined up and outran all New York Giants running backs in a race.

== Early radio career and military service ==
Glickman graduated from Syracuse University in 1939. In addition to his prominence in track and field, he was a star running back for the varsity football team. He had brief careers in professional football and basketball. He joined the radio station WHN in New York City, and by 1943 he was its sports director.

Following the American entry into World War II in 1941, Glickman joined the US Marines. He was an officer in the 4th Marine Air Wing from 1943 until the end of the war in 1945.

== Sportscasting ==
Glickman became a distinguished sportscaster, beginning as the voice man for the sports newsreels distributed by Paramount News, between 1948 and 1957 when Paramount News' newsreel production ended. He covered all local, national and global sports during that era in every genre. Glickman's poetic lilt and slight New York twang made him a favorite in those early years of news production.

After Paramount News, he became best known as the voice of the New York Knicks (21 years) and New York Giants (23 years). He also did some New York Rangers broadcasts. In the early 1960s, Glickman teamed up with the analyst Al DeRogatis, an ex-Giants defensive lineman, to form a legendary broadcast team for "New York Football Giants" fans. At the time home games were not televised so radio was the only way to get the Giants. When they were on the road many discovered a sound reason to turn down the TV audio in their living rooms and turn up the radio while those in the stands at Yankee Stadium held transistor radios to their ears. In later years, the WNEW-originated broadcasts included the WNEW sports editor Chip Cipolla. Glickman and Cipolla utilized a unique format in which Glickman broadcast the offense and Cipolla the defense. Glickman also broadcast New York high school football games while he was broadcasting for the Knicks.

Glickman was a longtime mentor of broadcasters. His most famous protégé, Marv Albert, eventually called radio broadcasts of the Knicks, Giants and Rangers. He also helped the careers of the acclaimed sportscasters Spencer Ross and Johnny Most. In 1991, Glickman himself became a member of the Curt Gowdy wing of the Basketball Hall of Fame; he was the second person selected for the announcers' award, following Gowdy himself in 1990. Quarterback Jim Kelly relied on Glickman's advice when he transitioned to a broadcast career for a brief period in the late 1990s.

Glickman joined the radio station WHN in 1939 and was its sports director by 1943. When the New York Knickerbockers were formed in 1946, Glickman was their radio announcer. Later, he was the National Basketball Association's first TV announcer. Glickman was also the first announcer for the New York Nets before the ABA-NBA merger, when they played in their first home, the Island Garden in Nassau County. Many feel he became the voice of the New York Nets as a favor to Lou Carnesecca, who left a successful stint as the basketball coach of St. John's University to be the first coach of the New York Nets. Marty Glickman was a play-by-play announcer for the New York Jets from 1972 to 1979 and 1987 to 1989.

He was also the voice of the Yonkers Raceway for 12 years and the New York Jets for 11 years. Glickman did pre- and post-game shows for the Brooklyn Dodgers and New York Yankees for 22 years. Glickman was often heard on WPIX-11's telecasts of local college basketball during the winter and also called the play-by-play of their broadcasts of the High School Football Game Of The Week, with former NY Yankee Elston Howard providing the color commentary. As the sports director of WCBS Radio in the 1960s, he briefly resurrected the ancient broadcasting art of re-creation, voicing blind play-by-play accounts of segments of New York Yankees spring training games to the huddled, chilled, baseball-starved masses in the metropolitan area.

Glickman became the first sports director for Home Box Office in 1972.

In addition, in the 1980s, Glickman also broadcast University of Connecticut football and basketball games for the Connecticut Radio Network. Glickman returned to college football in 1985, calling Ivy League football games for PBS.

In addition to this, Glickman covered track meets, wrestling matches from St. Nicholas Arena, roller derbies, rodeos and even a marbles tournament. NBC employed him as a critic and teacher of its sports announcers. In 1988, Glickman returned to television on NBC as a play-by-play replacement on its NFL telecasts while protégé Marv Albert was in Seoul covering the Olympics. He retired from broadcasting in December 1992, aged 74.

== Autobiography and documentary film ==
In 1996, his autobiography, The Fastest Kid on the Block: The Marty Glickman Story, was published; it was co-written by sportswriter Stan Isaacs.

On August 26, 2013, the documentary film Glickman by James L. Freedman was broadcast on HBO. Martin Scorsese was one of the film's executive producers. The film received positive reviews and was released on DVD in 2014.

Glickman was portrayed by Jeremy Ferdman in the 2016 biopic Race, about African American Olympic athlete Jesse Owens.

== Death ==
Glickman underwent heart bypass surgery at Lenox Hill Hospital in Manhattan, New York, on December 14, 2000, and died of complications on January 3, 2001. He was 83.

== See also ==
- Select list of Jewish track and field athletes
