= List of New York Knicks broadcasters =

The list of New York Knicks broadcasters represents all radio and television broadcasters who have been associated with the New York Knicks of the National Basketball Association since the 1940s.

== Television ==
| Years | Flagship station | Play-by-Play | Color Commentator |
|---|---|---|---|
| 1946–47 | WCBS-TV | Jack O'Reilly | |
| 1947–48 | WNBT | Stan Lomax | |
| 1948–49 | WPIX | Don Kellett | |
| 1949–50 | WABD/WPIX | Stan Lomax | |
| 1950–51 | WPIX | Curt Gowdy | Don Dunphy |
| 1951–54 | WPIX | Bud Palmer | |
| 1954–56 | WPIX | Bob Wolff | Bud Palmer |
| 1956–58 | WPIX | Bob Wolff | Sonny Hertzberg |
| 1958–60 | WPIX | Bob Wolff | |
| 1960–62 | None | None | None |
| 1962–64 | WPIX; Phonevision | Bob Wolff; Marty Glickman | |
| 1964–66 | WOR-TV | Bob Wolff | |
| 1966–67 | WOR-TV | Don Criqui | |
| 1967–69 | WOR-TV | Bob Wolff | Jim Gordon |
| 1969-70 | MSG Network; WOR-TV | Bob Wolff | |
| 1970-71 | MSG Network; WOR-TV | Bob Wolff; Tim Ryan | Jim Gordon |
| 1971-72 | MSG Network; WOR-TV | Bob Wolff; Tim Ryan | Tommy Byrnes |
| 1972-75 | MSG Network; WOR-TV | Bob Wolff | Cal Ramsey |
| 1975-76 | MSG Network; WOR-TV | Dick Stockton | Cal Ramsey |
| 1976-79 | MSG Network; WOR-TV | Andy Musser | Cal Ramsey |
| 1979-80 | MSG Network; WOR-TV | Andy Musser; Marv Albert | Cal Ramsey; Cal Ramsey |
| 1980-82 | MSG Network; WOR-TV | Jim Karvellas; Marv Albert | Cal Ramsey; Cal Ramsey |
| 1982–86 | MSG Network; WOR-TV | Jim Karvellas; Marv Albert | Butch Beard; Butch Beard |
| 1986–89 | MSG Network/WWOR-TV | Marv Albert | John Andariese |
| 1989–97 | MSG Network | Marv Albert | John Andariese |
| 1997–98 | MSG Network | Mike Breen | John Andariese |
| 1998–2000 | MSG Network | Mike Breen | Walt Frazier |
| 2000–04 | MSG Network | Marv Albert | Walt Frazier |
| 2004–Present | MSG Network | Mike Breen; Kenny Albert; Ed Cohen | Walt Frazier |

=== 2010s ===
| Year | Channel | Play-by-play | Color commentator(s) | Courtside reporter | Studio host | Studio analysts |
| 2018-19 | MSG Network | Mike Breen; Kenny Albert; Ed Cohen; Bob Wischusen | Walt Frazier | Rebecca Haarlow | Al Trautwig, Wally Szczerbiak, Alan Hahn | |
| 2017-18 | MSG Network | Mike Breen; Kenny Albert; Ed Cohen; Bob Wischusen | Walt Frazier | Rebecca Haarlow | Al Trautwig, Wally Szczerbiak, Alan Hahn | |
| 2016-17 | MSG Network | Mike Breen; Kenny Albert; Ed Cohen; Bob Wischusen | Walt Frazier | Rebecca Haarlow | Al Trautwig, Wally Szczerbiak, Alan Hahn | Alan Hahn, Wally Szczerbiak |
| 2015-16 | MSG Network | Mike Breen; Kenny Albert; Ed Cohen; Bob Wischusen | Walt Frazier | Alan Hahn, Wally Szczerbiak | Al Trautwig, Wally Szczerbiak, Alan Hahn | |
| 2014-15 | MSG Network | Mike Breen; Kenny Albert; Ed Cohen; Bob Wischusen | Walt Frazier | Tina Cervasio | Al Trautwig, Wally Szczerbiak, Alan Hahn | Alan Hahn, Wally Szczerbiak |
| 2013-14 | MSG Network | Mike Breen; Kenny Albert; Ed Cohen; Bob Wischusen | Walt Frazier | Tina Cervasio | Al Trautwig, Wally Szczerbiak, Alan Hahn | Alan Hahn, Wally Szczerbiak |
| 2012-13 | MSG Network | Mike Breen; Kenny Albert; Ed Cohen; Bob Wischusen | Walt Frazier | Tina Cervasio | Al Trautwig, Wally Szczerbiak, Alan Hahn | Alan Hahn, Wally Szczerbiak |
| 2011-12 | MSG Network | Mike Breen; Kenny Albert; Ed Cohen; Bob Wischusen | Walt Frazier | Tina Cervasio | Al Trautwig, Wally Szczerbiak, Alan Hahn | Alan Hahn |
| 2010-11 | MSG Network | Mike Breen; Kenny Albert; Ed Cohen; Bob Wischusen | Walt Frazier | Tina Cervasio | Al Trautwig, Wally Szczerbiak, Alan Hahn | |

=== 2000s ===
| Year | Channel | Play-by-play | Color commentator(s) | Courtside reporter | Studio host | Studio analysts |
| 2009-10 | MSG Network | Mike Breen | Walt Frazier | Tina Cervasio | Al Trautwig | |
| 2008-09 | MSG Network | Mike Breen | Walt Frazier | Tina Cervasio | Al Trautwig | |
| 2007-08 | MSG Network | Mike Breen | Walt Frazier | | Al Trautwig | |
| 2006-07 | MSG Network | Mike Breen | Walt Frazier | | Al Trautwig | |
| 2005-06 | MSG Network | Mike Breen | Walt Frazier | | Al Trautwig | |
| 2004-05 | MSG Network | Mike Breen | Walt Frazier | | Al Trautwig | |
| 2003-04 | MSG Network | Marv Albert | Walt Frazier | | Al Trautwig | |
| 2002-03 | MSG Network | Marv Albert | Walt Frazier | | Al Trautwig | |
| 2001-02 | MSG Network | Marv Albert | Walt Frazier | | Al Trautwig | |
| 2000-01 | MSG Network | Marv Albert | Walt Frazier | | Al Trautwig | |

=== 1970s ===
| Year | Channel | Play-by-play | Color commentator(s) | Courtside reporter | Studio host | Studio analysts |
| 1972-73 | Manhattan Cable Television & WOR-TV | Bob Wolff | Cal Ramsey | | | |

=== 1960s ===
| Year | Channel | Play-by-play | Color commentator(s) | Courtside reporter | Studio host | Studio analysts |
| 1969-70 | Manhattan Cable Television & WOR-TV | Bob Wolff and Marty Glickman | | | | |

=== Substitutes ===
==== Play-by-play ====
- Marty Glickman (1969–1970)
- Spencer Ross (1974–1977)
- Tim Ryan (1974–1977)
- Bruce Beck (1980–1998)
- Al Albert (1982–1983)
- Sam Rosen (1984–1986)
- Greg Gumbel (1988–1989)
- Al Trautwig (1989–2012)
- Mike Crispino (1992–2012)
- Gus Johnson (1998–2010, 2023)
- Mike Breen (2000–2004)
- Bob Wischusen (2006–2008)
- Kenny Albert (2009–2025)
- Spero Dedes (2011–2014)
- Ed Cohen (2017–2025)
- Bill Pidto (2023–present)
- Tyler Murray (2024–present)

==== Color commentator ====
- Kenny Smith (2005–2008)
- Kelly Tripucka (2008–2012)
- Doug Collins (2003–2004)
- Wally Szczerbiak (2019–present)
- Alan Hahn (2022–present)
- Monica McNutt (2024–present)
- Jamal Crawford (2024–2025)
- Steve Novak (2025–present)

== Radio ==
| Years | Flagship station | Play-by-Play | Color Commentator |
|---|---|---|---|
| 1946–48 | WHN | Marty Glickman | Stan Lomax |
| 1948–49 | WMGM | Marty Glickman | Connie Desmond |
| 1949–51 | WMGM | Marty Glickman | Bud Palmer |
| 1951–53 | WMGM | Marty Glickman | Johnny Most |
| 1953–54 | WMGM | Marty Glickman | Bert Lee |
| 1954–55 | WMGM | Marty Glickman | Jim Gordon |
| 1955–56 | WINS | Les Keiter | Jim Gordon |
| 1956–57 | WINS | Marty Glickman | Les Keiter |
| 1957–59 | WINS | Les Keiter | Jim Gordon |
| 1959-60 | WINS | Les Keiter | John Condon |
| 1960-61 | None | None | None |
| 1961-62 | WINS | Les Keiter | |
| 1962-63 | WCBS | Marty Glickman | |
| 1963-64 | None | None | None |
| 1964-65 | WOR | Lester Smith | Stan Lomax |
| 1965-66 | WNBC | Bill Mazer | |
| 1966-67 | WHN | Don Criqui | |
| 1967-70 | WHN | Marv Albert | |
| 1970-72 | WNBC | Marv Albert | |
| 1972-74 | WNBC | Marv Albert | John Andariese |
| 1974-76 | WNEW | Marv Albert | John Andariese |
| 1976-82 | WNEW | Marv Albert | Richie Guerin |
| 1982-84 | WNEW | Marv Albert | John Andariese |
| 1984–85 | WPAT | Marv Albert | John Andariese |
| 1985–86 | WNBC | Marv Albert | John Andariese |
| 1986–88 | WNBC | Jim Karvellas | Ernie Grunfeld |
| 1988–89 | WFAN | Jim Karvellas | Ernie Grunfeld |
| 1989–92 | WFAN | Jim Karvellas | Walt Frazier |
| 1992–97 | WFAN | Mike Breen | Walt Frazier |
| 1997–98 | WFAN | Gus Johnson | Walt Frazier |
| 1998–2000 | WFAN | Marv Albert | John Andariese |
| 2000–04 | WFAN | Mike Breen | John Andariese |
| 2004–10 | WEPN | Gus Johnson | John Andariese |
| 2010–12 | WEPN | Spero Dedes | John Andariese |
| 2012–14 | WEPN-FM | Spero Dedes | Brendan Brown |
| 2014–17 | WEPN-FM | Mike Crispino | Brendan Brown |
| 2017–23 | WEPN-FM | Ed Cohen | Brendan Brown |
| 2023–2024 | WEPN-FM | Pat O'Keefe | Monica McNutt |
| 2024-2025 | WHSQ | Tyler Murray | Monica McNutt |

Spanish language

- WADO: Clemson Smith-Muñiz (play-by-play), Ramón Rivas (color analyst)

=== 1970s ===
| Year | Flagship station | Play-by-play | Color commentator(s) | Courtside reporter | Studio host | Studio analysts |
| 1972-73 | WNBC | Marv Albert (main); Spencer Ross (alternate) | John Andariese | | Spencer Ross (main); Jim Gordon (alternate) | |

=== 1960s ===
| Year | Flagship station | Play-by-play | Color commentator(s) | Courtside reporter | Studio host | Studio analysts |
| 1969-70 | WHN | Marv Albert (main); Jim Gordon (alternate) | | | Jim Gordon (main); Win Elliott (alternate) | |

=== 1940s ===
It was not until the 1987–88 season that every Knicks' game was broadcast locally on radio in New York; for many years prior to that, only home games and (after the late 1940s) a handful of away games were heard. Regular-season away games heard on radio after the early 1960s were generally not broadcast locally on television.

=== Former affiliates (7 stations) ===
- WABY/1400: Albany
- WPTR/1540: Albany
- WCSS/1490: Amsterdam
- WENT/1340 Gloversville
- WHUC/1230: Hudson
- WIZR/930: Johnstown
- WVKZ/1240: Schenectady
- WOFX/980: Troy

=== Substitutes ===
==== Play-by-play ====
- Jim Gordon (1963–1971)
- Spencer Ross (1971–1976, 1999–2002)
- Bob Wolff (1976–1986)
- Sam Rosen (1979–1984)
- Charley Steiner (1987–1988)
- David J. Halberstam (1988–1992)
- John Minko (1992–1999)
- Gus Johnson (1998–2004)
- Bob Papa (1998–2004)
- Mike Crispino (2002–2010)
- Kenny Albert (2009–present)
- Spero Dedes (2011–2014)
- Bob Wischusen (2012–present)
- Ed Cohen (2017–present)

==== Studio Hosts ====
- Win Elliott (1963–1971)
- Jim Gordon (1971–1976)
