= Martucci =

Martucci is an Italian surname. Notable people with the surname include:

- Alessandro Martucci, Italian painter
- Christian Martucci (born 1977), American musician and songwriter
- Giuseppe Martucci (1856–1909), Italian composer, pianist and conductor
- Matt Martucci, American sports announcer
- Mirko Martucci (born 1988), Italian footballer
