= 2016 Lehigh Mountain Hawks football team =

American college football season

2016 Lehigh Mountain Hawks football

Patriot League champion

FCS Playoffs First Round, L 21–64 vs. New Hampshire
- Conference: Patriot League

Ranking
- STATS: No. 21
- FCS Coaches: No. 18
- Record: 9–3 (6–0 Patriot)
- Head coach: Andy Coen (11th season)
- Offensive coordinator: Drew Folmar (3rd season)
- Defensive coordinator: Joe Bottiglieri (3rd season)
- Home stadium: Goodman Stadium

2016 Patriot League football standings
	Conf.			Overall
Team	W		L	W		L
No. 21 Lehigh $^	6	–	0	9	–	3
Fordham	5	–	1	8	–	3
Colgate	4	–	2	5	–	5
Bucknell	3	–	3	4	–	7
Holy Cross	2	–	4	4	–	7
Lafayette	1	–	5	2	–	9
Georgetown	0	–	6	3	–	8
$ – Conference champion; ^ – FCS playoff participant; Rankings from STATS Poll

The 2016 Lehigh Mountain Hawks football team represented Lehigh University in the 2016 NCAA Division I FCS football season. They were led by 11th-year head coach Andy Coen and played their home games at Goodman Stadium. They were a member of the Patriot League. They finished the season 9–3, 6–0 in Patriot League play to be crowned Patriot League champions. They earned the League's automatic bid into the FCS playoffs where they lost in the first round to New Hampshire.

== Schedule ==
Date	Time	Opponent	Rank	Site	TV	Result	Attendance
September 3	12:30 pm	Monmouth*		Goodman Stadium; Bethlehem, PA	SE2	L 21–23	4,828
September 10	6:00 pm	No. 22 Villanova*		Villanova Stadium; Villanova, PA	NNAA	L 21–26	6,419
September 17	5:00 pm	at Penn*		Franklin Field; Philadelphia, PA	ILDN	W 49–28	5,650
September 24	12:30 pm	Princeton*		Goodman Stadium; Bethlehem, PA	PLN, SE2	W 42–28	5,493
October 1	1:30 pm	at Yale*		Yale Bowl; New Haven, CT	OWSPN	W 63–35	2,196
October 8	12:30 pm	Colgate		Goodman Stadium; Bethlehem, PA	PLN, SE2	W 45–31	9,255
October 15	2:00 pm	at Georgetown		Cooper Field; Washington, DC	PLN	W 35–3	2,455
October 22	12:00 pm	at Holy Cross		Fitton Field; Worcester, MA	ASN	W 46–14	3,668
October 29	12:30 pm	Fordham		Goodman Stadium; Bethlehem, PA	PLN, SE2	W 58–37	6,009
November 5	12:30 pm	Bucknell	No. 24	Goodman Stadium; Bethlehem, PA	PLN	W 20–13	7,049
November 19	12:30 pm	at Lafayette	No. 19	Fisher Stadium; Easton, PA (The Rivalry)	WFMZ	W 45–21	12,587
November 26	2:00 pm	at No. 22 New Hampshire*	No. 18	Wildcat Stadium; Durham, NH (NCAA Division I First Round)	ESPN3	L 21–64	2,240
*Non-conference game; Rankings from STATS Poll released prior to the game; All times are in Eastern time

== Roster ==
2016 Lehigh Mountain Hawks football team roster
Players			Coaches
Offense: Pos. / # / Name / Class; QB / 14 / Matt Timochenko / Jr	Defense: Pos. / # / Name / Class	Special teams: Pos. / # / Name / Class	Head coach: Andy Coen; Coordinators/assistant coaches Legend: (C) Team captain; (S) Suspended; (I) Ineligible; Injured; Redshirt; Roster

== Game summaries ==
=== Monmouth ===
	1	2	3	4	Total
Hawks	0	7	7	9	23
Mountain Hawks	0	0	7	14	21

=== At Villanova ===
	1	2	3	4	Total
Mountain Hawks	0	14	0	7	21
#22 Wildcats	6	0	14	6	26

=== At Penn ===
	1	2	3	4	Total
Mountain Hawks	7	21	14	7	49
Quakers	14	14	0	0	28

=== Princeton ===
	1	2	3	4	Total
Tigers	7	7	0	14	28
Mountain Hawks	7	14	14	7	42

=== At Yale (Yank Townsend Trophy) ===
	1	2	3	4	Total
Mountain Hawks	21	21	21	0	63
Bulldogs	7	21	0	7	35

=== Colgate ===
	1	2	3	4	Total
Raiders	14	3	7	7	31
Mountain Hawks	7	7	24	7	45

=== At Georgetown ===
	1	2	3	4	Total
Mountain Hawks	7	7	14	7	35
Hoyas	0	3	0	0	3

=== At Holy Cross ===
	1	2	3	4	Total
Mountain Hawks	7	11	21	7	46
Crusaders	7	0	0	7	14

=== Fordham ===
	1	2	3	4	Total
Rams	6	3	7	21	37
Mountain Hawks	16	21	14	7	58

=== Bucknell ===
	1	2	3	4	Total
Bison	7	6	0	0	13
#24 Mountain Hawks	7	0	13	0	20

=== At Lafayette ===
	1	2	3	4	Total
#19 Mountain Hawks	7	24	14	0	45
Leopards	0	7	6	8	21

== FCS Playoffs ==
=== First Round–New Hampshire ===
	1	2	3	4	Total
#18 Mountain Hawks	0	14	7	0	21
#22 Wildcats	15	21	14	14	64

== Ranking movements ==
Ranking movements Legend: ██ Increase in ranking ██ Decrease in ranking — = Not ranked RV = Received votes
	Week													
Poll	Pre	1	2	3	4	5	6	7	8	9	10	11	12	Final
STATS FCS	—	—	—	—	—	—	RV	RV	RV	24	23	19	18	21
Coaches	—	—	—	—	—	RV	RV	RV	24	21	18	17	15	18
