= 2016 Penn Quakers football team =

American college football season

2016 Penn Quakers football

Ivy League co-champion
- Conference: Ivy League
- Record: 7–3 (6–1 Ivy)
- Head coach: Ray Priore (2nd season)
- Offensive coordinator: John Reagan (2nd season)
- Offensive scheme: Spread
- Defensive coordinator: Bob Benson (2nd season)
- Base defense: 3–3–5
- Home stadium: Franklin Field

2016 Ivy League football standings
	Conf.			Overall
Team	W		L	W		L
Princeton +	6	–	1	8	–	2
Penn +	6	–	1	7	–	3
Harvard	5	–	2	7	–	3
Brown	3	–	4	4	–	6
Yale	3	–	4	3	–	7
Cornell	2	–	5	4	–	6
Columbia	2	–	5	3	–	7
Dartmouth	1	–	6	4	–	6
+ – Conference co-champions

The 2016 Penn Quakers football team represented the University of Pennsylvania during the 2016 NCAA Division I FCS football season. They were led by second year head coach Ray Priore and played their home games at Franklin Field. They are a member of the Ivy League. Penn finished the season 7–3 overall and 6–1 in Ivy League play to tie with Princeton for the Ivy League title. Penn averaged 5,589 fans per game.

== Schedule ==
Date	Time	Opponent	Site	TV	Result	Attendance
September 17	5:00 p.m.	Lehigh*	Franklin Field; Philadelphia, PA	ILDN	L 28–49	5,650
September 24	1:00 p.m.	at Fordham*	Coffey Field; Bronx, NY	CI	L 17–31	7,816
September 30	7:00 p.m.	at Dartmouth	Memorial Field; Hanover, NH	NBCSN	W 37–24	5,932
October 8	1:00 p.m.	Central Connecticut*	Franklin Field; Philadelphia, PA	ILDN	W 28–16	3,115
October 15	3:00 p.m.	Columbia	Franklin Field; Philadelphia, PA	OWSPN	W 35–10	6,044
October 21	7:00 p.m.	at Yale	Yale Bowl; New Haven, CT	NBCSN	W 42–7	8,674
October 29	1:00 p.m.	Brown^{†}	Franklin Field; Philadelphia, PA	ILDN	W 21–14	8,047
November 5	Noon	at Princeton	Powers Field at Princeton Stadium; Princeton, NJ (rivalry)	ASN	L 0–28	7,367
November 11	8:00 p.m.	Harvard	Franklin Field; Philadelphia, PA (rivalry)	NBCSN	W 27–14	5,092
November 19	Noon	at Cornell	Schoellkopf Field; Ithaca, NY (rivalry)	FCS	W 42–20	6,333
*Non-conference game; ^{†}Homecoming; All times are in Eastern time

== Roster ==
2016 Penn Quakers football team roster
Players
Coaches
Offense

Pos.	#	Name	Class
WR	2	Kohl Hollinquest	Fr
WR	3	Cameron Countryman	Sr
WR	4	Peter Whiteneck	Sr
WR	5	Justin Watson	Jr
QB	10	Alek Torgersen	Sr
RB	22	Tre Solomon	Jr
RB	48	Ryan Ripp	Sr

Defense

Pos.	#	Name	Class
DB	1	Mason Williams	So
DB	2	Jacob Martin	Fr
DB	5	Eric Markes	Fr
DB	26	Alex Moore	Sr
LB	37	Zach O'Leary	Jr
LB	50	Alex Weber	Jr

Special teams

Pos.	#	Name	Class
K	96	Aron Morgan	Sr

Head coach

- Ray Priore

Coordinators/assistant coaches

Legend

- (C) Team captain
- (S) Suspended
- (I) Ineligible
- Injured
- Redshirt

Roster

== Ranking movements ==
Ranking movements Legend: ██ Increase in ranking ██ Decrease in ranking — = Not ranked RV = Received votes
	Week													
Poll	Pre	1	2	3	4	5	6	7	8	9	10	11	12	Final
STATS FCS	RV	RV	RV	—	—	RV	RV	RV	RV					
Coaches	RV	RV	RV	—	—	—	—	—	RV					
