= 2016 Yale Bulldogs football team =

American college football season

2016 Yale Bulldogs football
- Conference: Ivy League
- Record: 3–7 (3–4 Ivy)
- Head coach: Tony Reno (5th season)
- Offensive coordinator: Joe Conlin (3rd season)
- Offensive scheme: Spread
- Defensive coordinator: Steve Vashel (1st season)
- Base defense: 4–3
- Home stadium: Yale Bowl

2016 Ivy League football standings
	Conf.			Overall
Team	W		L	W		L
Princeton +	6	–	1	8	–	2
Penn +	6	–	1	7	–	3
Harvard	5	–	2	7	–	3
Brown	3	–	4	4	–	6
Yale	3	–	4	3	–	7
Cornell	2	–	5	4	–	6
Columbia	2	–	5	3	–	7
Dartmouth	1	–	6	4	–	6
+ – Conference co-champions

The 2016 Yale Bulldogs football team represented Yale University in the 2016 NCAA Division I FCS football season. This season marked the Bulldogs's 144th overall season and the team played its home games at Yale Bowl in New Haven, Connecticut. They were led by fifth-year head coach Tony Reno. They were a member of the Ivy League. They finished the season 3–7 overall and 3–4 in Ivy League play to tie for fourth place. Yale averaged 8,795 fans per game.

Yale ended a nine-year losing streak in their rivalry game against Harvard with a 21–14 win.

== Schedule ==
Date	Time	Opponent	Site	TV	Result	Attendance
September 17	1:30 p.m.	No. 23 Colgate*	Yale Bowl; New Haven, CT	OWSPN	L 13–55	8,493
September 24	3:00 p.m.	at Cornell	Schoellkopf Field; Ithaca, NY	ILDN	L 13–27	15,493
October 1	1:30 p.m.	Lehigh*	Yale Bowl; New Haven, CT	OWSPN	L 35–63	2,196
October 8	1:30 p.m.	Dartmouth	Yale Bowl; New Haven, CT	ILDN	W 21–13	9,293
October 15	1:00 p.m.	at Fordham*	Coffey Field; Bronx, NY	CI	L 37–44	4,671
October 21	7:00 p.m.	Penn	Yale Bowl; New Haven, CT	NBCSN	L 7–42	8,674
October 28	7:00 p.m.	at Columbia	Robert K. Kraft Field at Lawrence A. Wien Stadium; New York, NY	NBCSN	W 31–23	3,268
November 5	12:30 p.m.	at Brown	Brown Stadium; Providence, RI	ILDN	L 22–27	4,229
November 12	12:30 p.m.	Princeton	Yale Bowl; New Haven, CT (rivalry)	ILDN	L 3–31	15,321
November 19	12:30 p.m.	at Harvard	Harvard Stadium; Boston, MA (rivalry)	CNBC	W 21–14	31,662
*Non-conference game; Rankings from STATS Poll released prior to the game; All times are in Eastern time

== Roster ==
2016 Yale Bulldogs football team roster
Players
Coaches
Offense

Pos.	#	Name	Class
RB	1	Dale Harris	Sr
WR	2	Bo Hines	Jr
WR	3	Ross Drwal	Jr
TE	4	Sebastian Little	Sr
RB	5	Alan Lamar	Fr
QB	6	Kurt Rawlings	Fr
RB	7	Candler Rich	Sr
WR	8	Caden Herring	Fr
WR	9	Michael Siragusa Jr.	Jr
QB	10	Tre Moore	So
QB	11	Spencer McManes	Sr
WR	12	Jamal Locke	Jr
QB	13	Stephen Barmore	Jr
WR	14	Reed Klubnik	Fr
TE	16	Jackson Stallings	Sr
QB	17	Henry Baldwin	Jr
QB	18	Rafe Chapple	Jr
WR	20	C. J. McCord	So
RB	21	Kamsi Nwangwu	So
WR	22	Silas Wyper	Jr
WR	25	Kyle Marcinick	So
RB	31	Deshawn Salter	Jr
RB	34	Kyle Ellerson	So
TE	39	Quinn Dawson	Fr
TE	46	Jaeden Graham	Jr
OL	60	Cody Arledge	Jr
OL	61	Jon Bezney	Jr
OL	63	Anders Huizenga	Jr
OL	64	Jamison Hale	So
OL	65	Khalid Cannon	Sr
OL	66	Jeho Chang	Jr
OL	67	Jacob Van de Grift	So
OL	69	Jacob Schmidt	So
OL	70	Rees LeMay	So
OL	71	Beau Iverson	Sr
OL	72	Dieter Eiselen	Fr
OL	73	Lucas Tribble	Fr
OL	74	Sterling Strother	Fr
OL	75	Mason Friedline	Sr
OL	76	Jack Lee	So
OL	77	Jett Sexton	Fr
OL	78	Steven Cepalia	Fr
OL	79	Karl Marback	Jr
TE	80	Leo Haenni	Jr
WR	81	Blake Rowlinson	Sr
WR	82	Myles Gaines	Sr
WR	83	Robert Clemons III	Sr
WR	84	Christopher Williams-Lopez	Jr
TE	85	Conor Furey	Jr
TE	86	John Lager	So
WR	87	Garrett White	Fr
WR	88	J. P. Shohfi	Fr

Defense

Pos.	#	Name	Class
DB	2	Marquise Peggs	So
DB	3	Malcolm Dixon	Fr
DB	6	Jaelin Alburg	Fr
LB	8	Keefer Johnson	Jr
LB	10	Victor Egu	Sr
DB	13	Jack Westafer	Fr
DB	14	Will Bryan IV	Jr
DB	15	Andrew Johnson	Jr
DB	17	Spencer Rymiszewski	Sr
LB	18	Ryan Burke	Fr
DB	19	Jason Alessi	Jr
DB	20	Tosan Agbeyegbe	Fr
OLB	22	Matthew Oplinger	Jr
DB	23	Foyesade Oluokun	Sr
DB	26	Hayden Carlson	Jr
LB	27	Jarett Balter	So
OLB	28	Brian Sykes	Sr
DB	29	Daniel Debner	So
DB	33	Henry Segel	Fr
DB	34	Brendan MacPhee	Fr
LB	35	Alexander Abelite	Fr
DE	36	J. Hunter Roman	So
LB	38	Darius Manora	Sr
DB	41	Alex Young	Fr
LB	42	Quintin Herbert	So
DB	44	Scott Patton	So
OLB	45	Remick Kawawaki	Sr
DE	47	John Herubin	Jr
DE	48	Earl Chism	Jr
DE	50	Spencer Matthaei	Fr
DL	52	Joshua Keeler	Fr
LB	53	Christopher Maxwell	So
DL	54	Julian Fraser	Fr
DE	55	Bronson Krull	So
DL	56	Daniel James	So
LB	57	Ronnie Meder	Jr
DE	87	Devin Moore	Fr
DL	89	Jack Rushin	Sr
DT	90	Nicholas Hardy	Jr
DT	91	Nicholas Crowle	Jr
DE	92	Charles Callender	Fr
DE	93	Matthew McCabe	Fr
DE	94	Sean Kissel	Fr
DE	95	Tim Dawson II	Jr
DE	98	Kyle Mullen	So
DE	99	Marty Moesta	Sr

Special teams

Pos.	#	Name	Class
P, PK	30	Brian Dolan	Fr
K, P	43	Bryan Holmes	Sr
K, P	49	Sam Tuckerman	Fr
LS	51	Ryan Oak	So
LS	59	Hunter Simino	So
K, P	81	Alex Galland	So
K, P	97	Blake Horn	Jr

Head coach

- Tony Reno

Coordinators/assistant coaches

Legend

- (C) Team captain
- (S) Suspended
- (I) Ineligible
- Injured
- Redshirt

Roster
