= 2016 Colgate Raiders football team =

American college football season

2016 Colgate Raiders football
- Conference: Patriot League
- Record: 5–5 (4–2 Patriot)
- Head coach: Dan Hunt (3rd season)
- Offensive coordinator: Chris Young (3rd season)
- Defensive coordinator: Paul Shaffner (4th season)
- Home stadium: Crown Field at Andy Kerr Stadium

2016 Patriot League football standings
	Conf.			Overall
Team	W		L	W		L
No. 21 Lehigh $^	6	–	0	9	–	3
Fordham	5	–	1	8	–	3
Colgate	4	–	2	5	–	5
Bucknell	3	–	3	4	–	7
Holy Cross	2	–	4	4	–	7
Lafayette	1	–	5	2	–	9
Georgetown	0	–	6	3	–	8
$ – Conference champion; ^ – FCS playoff participant; Rankings from STATS Poll

The 2016 Colgate Raiders football team represented Colgate University in the 2016 NCAA Division I FCS football season. They were led by third-year head coach Dan Hunt and played their home games at Crown Field at Andy Kerr Stadium. They were a member of the Patriot League. They finished the season 5–5, 4–2 in Patriot League play to finish in third place.

== Schedule ==
Date	Time	Opponent	Rank	Site	TV	Result	Attendance
September 2	7:00 pm	at Syracuse*	No. 21	Carrier Dome; Syracuse, NY (rivalry)	ACCN+	L 7–33	31,336
September 17	1:30 pm	at Yale*	No. 23	Yale Bowl; New Haven, CT	OWSPN	W 55–13	8,493
September 24	3:30 pm	at No. 7 Richmond*	No. 23	Robins Stadium; Richmond, VA	CSN MA+	L 31–38	8,700
October 1	1:00 pm	Cornell*^{†}		Crown Field at Andy Kerr Stadium; Hamilton, NY (rivalry)	TWCSC	L 38–39	8,010
October 8	12:30 pm	at Lehigh		Goodman Stadium; Bethlehem, PA	PLN	L 31–45	9,255
October 15	1:00 pm	at Bucknell		Christy Mathewson–Memorial Stadium; Lewisburg, PA	PLN	W 27–7	2,793
October 29	1:00 pm	Holy Cross		Crown Field at Andy Kerr Stadium; Hamilton, NY	PLN	W 26–8	7,226
November 5	1:00 pm	at Fordham		Coffey Field; Bronx, NY	PLN	L 20–24	4,285
November 12	1:00 pm	Lafayette		Crown Field at Andy Kerr Stadium; Hamilton, NY	PLN	W 38–17	4,859
November 19	1:00 pm	Georgetown		Crown Field at Andy Kerr Stadium; Hamilton, NY	PLN	W 38–10	4,223
*Non-conference game; ^{†}Homecoming; Rankings from STATS Poll released prior to the game; All times are in Eastern time

== Game summaries ==
=== At Syracuse ===
	1	2	3	4	Total
#21 Raiders	7	0	0	0	7
Orange	7	13	6	7	33

=== At Yale ===
	1	2	3	4	Total
#23 Raiders	21	14	10	10	55
Bulldogs	7	6	0	0	13

=== At Richmond ===
	1	2	3	4	Total
#23 Raiders	14	3	0	14	31
#7 Spiders	10	7	14	7	38

=== Cornell ===
	1	2	3	4	Total
Big Red	0	12	21	6	39
Raiders	21	10	7	0	38

=== At Lehigh ===
	1	2	3	4	Total
Raiders	14	3	7	7	31
Mountain Hawks	7	7	24	7	45

=== At Bucknell ===
	1	2	3	4	Total
Raiders	3	10	0	14	27
Bison	0	0	7	0	7

=== Holy Cross ===
	1	2	3	4	Total
Crusaders	0	0	0	8	8
Raiders	7	3	0	16	26

=== At Fordham ===
	1	2	3	4	Total
Raiders	7	7	6	0	20
Rams	3	7	7	7	24

=== Lafayette ===
	1	2	3	4	Total
Leopards	0	7	10	0	17
Raiders	10	14	7	7	38

=== Georgetown ===
	1	2	3	4	Total
Hoyas	0	3	0	7	10
Raiders	7	14	10	7	38

== Ranking movements ==
Ranking movements Legend: ██ Increase in ranking ██ Decrease in ranking — = Not ranked RV = Received votes
	Week													
Poll	Pre	1	2	3	4	5	6	7	8	9	10	11	12	Final
STATS FCS	21	21	23	23	RV	RV	—	RV						
Coaches	16	20	23	21	25	—	—	—						
