= 2016 Harvard Crimson football team =

American college football season

2016 Harvard Crimson football
- Conference: Ivy League
- Record: 7–3 (5–2 Ivy)
- Head coach: Tim Murphy (23rd season)
- Offensive coordinator: Joel Lamb (11th season)
- Offensive scheme: Spread
- Defensive coordinator: Scott Larkee (8th season)
- Base defense: 4–3
- Home stadium: Harvard Stadium

2016 Ivy League football standings
	Conf.			Overall
Team	W		L	W		L
Princeton +	6	–	1	8	–	2
Penn +	6	–	1	7	–	3
Harvard	5	–	2	7	–	3
Brown	3	–	4	4	–	6
Yale	3	–	4	3	–	7
Cornell	2	–	5	4	–	6
Columbia	2	–	5	3	–	7
Dartmouth	1	–	6	4	–	6
+ – Conference co-champions

The 2016 Harvard Crimson football team represented Harvard University during the 2016 NCAA Division I FCS football season. They were led by 23rd-year head coach Tim Murphy and played their home games at Harvard Stadium. They were a member of the Ivy League. They finished the season 7–3 overall and 5–2 in Ivy League play to place third. Harvard averaged 14,741 fans per game.

== Schedule ==
Date	Time	Opponent	Rank	Site	TV	Result	Attendance
September 16	7:00 p.m.	Rhode Island*		Harvard Stadium; Boston, MA	ASN	W 51–21	12,167
September 24	2:00 p.m.	at Brown		Brown Stadium; Providence, RI	OWSPN	W 32–22	8,174
September 30	7:00 p.m.	Georgetown*	No. 25	Harvard Stadium; Boston, MA	ESPN3	W 31–17	7,138
October 8	1:00 p.m.	Cornell	No. 22	Harvard Stadium; Boston, MA	OWSPN	W 29–13	11,509
October 15	1:05 p.m.	at Holy Cross*	No. 20	Fitton Field; Worcester, MA	CI	L 17–27	9,115
October 22	1:00 p.m.	at Princeton		Powers Field at Princeton Stadium; Princeton, NJ (rivalry)	ILDN	W 23–20 ^{OT}	9,963
October 29	1:30 p.m.	at Dartmouth	No. 24	Memorial Field; Hanover, NH (rivalry)	ILDN	W 23–21	7,012
November 5	1:00 p.m.	Columbia	No. 23	Harvard Stadium; Boston, MA	OWSPN	W 28–21	11,233
November 11	8:00 p.m.	at Penn	No. 24	Franklin Field; Philadelphia, PA (rivalry)	NBCSN	L 14–27	5,092
November 19	12:30 p.m.	Yale		Harvard Stadium; Boston, MA (rivalry)	CNBC	L 14–21	31,662
*Non-conference game; Rankings from STATS Poll released prior to the game; All times are in Eastern time

== Rankings ==
Ranking movements Legend: ██ Increase in ranking ██ Decrease in ranking — = Not ranked RV = Received votes
	Week													
Poll	Pre	1	2	3	4	5	6	7	8	9	10	11	12	Final
STATS FCS	RV	RV	RV	RV	25	22	20	RV	24	23	24	RV	RV	
Coaches	19	21	22	19	19	16	15	23	23	22	22	RV	—	
