= 2016 Columbia Lions football team =

American college football season

2016 Columbia Lions football
- Conference: Ivy League
- Record: 3–7 (2–5 Ivy)
- Head coach: Al Bagnoli (2nd season)
- Offensive coordinator: Mark Fabish (1st season)
- Defensive coordinator: Paul Ferraro (2nd season)
- Home stadium: Robert K. Kraft Field at Lawrence A. Wien Stadium

2016 Ivy League football standings
	Conf.			Overall
Team	W		L	W		L
Princeton +	6	–	1	8	–	2
Penn +	6	–	1	7	–	3
Harvard	5	–	2	7	–	3
Brown	3	–	4	4	–	6
Yale	3	–	4	3	–	7
Cornell	2	–	5	4	–	6
Columbia	2	–	5	3	–	7
Dartmouth	1	–	6	4	–	6
+ – Conference co-champions

The 2016 Columbia Lions football team represented Columbia University in the 2016 NCAA Division I FCS football season. They were led by second year head coach Al Bagnoli and played their home games at Robert K. Kraft Field at Lawrence A. Wien Stadium. They are a member of the Ivy League. Columbia averaged 5,212 fans per game.

== Schedule ==
Date	Time	Opponent	Site	TV	Result	Attendance
September 17	1:00 p.m.	Saint Francis (PA)*	Robert K. Kraft Field at Lawrence A. Wien Stadium; New York, NY	ILDN	L 9–13	4,323
September 24	2:00 p.m.	at Georgetown*	Cooper Field; Washington, DC	PLN	L 14–17	2,367
October 1	12:00 p.m.	Princeton	Robert K. Kraft Field at Lawrence A. Wien Stadium; New York, NY	FCS	L 13–48	3,638
October 8	6:00 p.m.	at Wagner*	Wagner College Stadium; Staten Island, NY	NECFR	W 15–13	1,973
October 15	3:00 p.m.	at Penn	Franklin Field; Philadelphia, PA	OWSPN	L 10–35	6,044
October 22	1:30 p.m.	Dartmouth^{†}	Robert K. Kraft Field at Lawrence A. Wien Stadium; New York, NY	OWSPN	W 9–7	8,946
October 28	7:00 p.m.	Yale	Robert K. Kraft Field at Lawrence A. Wien Stadium; New York, NY	NBCSN	L 23–31	3,268
November 5	1:00 p.m.	at No. 23 Harvard	Harvard Stadium; Boston, MA	OWSPN	L 21–28	11,233
November 12	1:00 p.m.	Cornell	Robert K. Kraft Field at Lawrence A. Wien Stadium; New York, NY (rivalry)	ILDN	L 40–42	5,887
November 19	12:30 p.m.	at Brown	Brown Stadium; Providence, RI	ILDN	W 31–13	3,139
*Non-conference game; ^{†}Homecoming; Rankings from STATS Poll released prior to the game; All times are in Eastern time

== Game summaries ==
=== Saint Francis (PA) ===
	1	2	3	4	Total
Red Flash	3	3	0	7	13
Lions	0	0	3	6	9

=== At Georgetown ===
	1	2	3	4	Total
Lions	0	0	7	7	14
Hoyas	10	7	0	0	17

=== Princeton ===
	1	2	3	4	Total
Tigers	6	28	14	0	48
Lions	6	0	0	7	13

=== At Wagner ===
	1	2	3	4	Total
Lions	3	3	6	3	15
Seahawks	3	10	0	0	13
