= Ivan Kelly =

Ukrainian soccer commentator

Ivan Kelly is a Ukrainian soccer commentator. He covered soccer matches for NSL franchise Fort Lauderdale Strikers and commentated on the NAIA National Championship in 2015. He commentated on the NASL Spring and Fall seasons alongside Thomas Rongen. Kelly had covered both men and women's soccer matches for Lynn University since 2013, before he joined Fort Lauderdale Strikers in 2015.

Ivan Kelly began his career in 2012 working as a broadcast liaison officer for UEFA Euro 2012 hosted in Poland & Ukraine. He broadcast matches on ESPN3 and One World Sports during his time with Fort Lauderdale Strikers
