= 2016 Dartmouth Big Green football team =

American college football season

2016 Dartmouth Big Green football
- Conference: Ivy League
- Record: 4–6 (1–6 Ivy)
- Head coach: Buddy Teevens (17th season)
- Offensive coordinator: Keith Clark (7th season)
- Offensive scheme: Multiple
- Defensive coordinator: Don Dobes (7th season)
- Base defense: 4–3
- Home stadium: Memorial Field

2016 Ivy League football standings
	Conf.			Overall
Team	W		L	W		L
Princeton +	6	–	1	8	–	2
Penn +	6	–	1	7	–	3
Harvard	5	–	2	7	–	3
Brown	3	–	4	4	–	6
Yale	3	–	4	3	–	7
Cornell	2	–	5	4	–	6
Columbia	2	–	5	3	–	7
Dartmouth	1	–	6	4	–	6
+ – Conference co-champions

The 2016 Dartmouth Big Green football team represented Dartmouth College in the 2016 NCAA Division I FCS football season. The Big Green were led by head coach Buddy Teevens in his 12th straight year and 17th overall. They played their home games at Memorial Field. They were a member of the Ivy League. Dartmouth averaged 5,638 fans per game.

== Schedule ==
Date	Time	Opponent	Site	TV	Result	Attendance
September 17	7:00 p.m.	No. 22 New Hampshire*	Memorial Field; Hanover, NH (rivalry)	FCS	W 22–21	8,296
September 24	1:05 p.m.	at Holy Cross*	Fitton Field; Worcester, MA	Charter TV3	W 35–10	9,878
September 30	7:00 p.m.	Penn	Memorial Field; Hanover, NH	NBCSN	L 24–37	5,932
October 8	1:00 p.m.	at Yale	Yale Bowl; New Haven, CT	ILDN	L 13–21	9,293
October 15	1:30 p.m.	Towson*	Memorial Field; Hanover, NH	ILDN	W 20–17	3,124
October 22	1:30 p.m.	at Columbia	Robert K. Kraft Field at Lawrence A. Wien Stadium; New York, NY	OWSPN	L 7–9	8,946
October 29	1:30 p.m.	No. 24 Harvard	Memorial Field; Hanover, NH (rivalry)	ILDN	L 21–23	7,012
November 5	1:30 p.m.	at Cornell	Schoellkopf Field; Ithaca, NY (rivalry)	ILDN	W 17–13	3,783
November 12	12:00 p.m.	Brown	Memorial Field; Hanover, NH	OWSPN	L 21–24	3,826
November 19	1:30 p.m.	at Princeton	Powers Field at Princeton Stadium; Princeton, NJ	OWSPN	L 21–38	8,320
*Non-conference game; Rankings from STATS Poll released prior to the game; All times are in Eastern time

== Ranking movements ==
Ranking movements Legend: ██ Increase in ranking ██ Decrease in ranking — = Not ranked RV = Received votes
	Week													
Poll	Pre	1	2	3	4	5	6	7	8	9	10	11	12	Final
STATS FCS	RV	RV	RV	RV	RV	RV	—	—	—					
Coaches	RV	RV	RV	RV	RV	—	—	—	—					
