= 2016 Cornell Big Red football team =

American college football season

2016 Cornell Big Red football
- Conference: Ivy League
- Record: 4–6 (2–5 Ivy)
- Head coach: David Archer (4th season)
- Offensive coordinator: Roy Istvan (3rd season)
- Defensive coordinator: Jared Backus (4th season)
- Captains: Miles Norris; Ben Rogers; Matt Sullivan; Jackson Weber
- Home stadium: Schoellkopf Field

2016 Ivy League football standings
	Conf.			Overall
Team	W		L	W		L
Princeton +	6	–	1	8	–	2
Penn +	6	–	1	7	–	3
Harvard	5	–	2	7	–	3
Brown	3	–	4	4	–	6
Yale	3	–	4	3	–	7
Cornell	2	–	5	4	–	6
Columbia	2	–	5	3	–	7
Dartmouth	1	–	6	4	–	6
+ – Conference co-champions

The 2016 Cornell Big Red football team represented Cornell University in the 2016 NCAA Division I FCS football season as a member of the Ivy League. They were led by fourth-year head coach David Archer and play their home games at Schoellkopf Field. Cornell finished the season 4–6 overall and 2–5 in Ivy League play to tie for sixth place.

== Schedule ==
The 2016 schedule consisted of five home and five away games. The Big Red hosted Ivy League foes Yale, Princeton, Dartmouth and Penn, and traveled to Harvard, Brown, and Columbia.

As in 2015, Cornell's non-conference opponents were Bucknell and Colgate of the Patriot League, and Sacred Heart of the Northeast Conference (NEC). Homecoming coincided with the home opener against Yale on September 24.

Date	Time	Opponent	Site	TV	Result	Attendance
September 17	6:00 p.m.	at Bucknell*	Christy Mathewson–Memorial Stadium; Lewisburg, PA	CI	W 24–16	4,628
September 24	3:00 p.m.	Yale^{†}	Schoellkopf Field; Ithaca, NY	ILDN	W 27–13	15,493
October 1	1:00 p.m.	at Colgate*	Crown Field at Andy Kerr Stadium; Hamilton, NY (rivalry)	TWCSC	W 39–38	8,010
October 8	1:00 p.m.	at No. 22 Harvard	Harvard Stadium; Boston, MA	OWSPN	L 13–29	11,509
October 15	1:30 p.m.	Sacred Heart*	Schoellkopf Field; Ithaca, NY	ILDN	L 24–31	6,739
October 22	12:00 p.m.	at Brown	Brown Stadium; Providence, RI	FCS	L 21–28 ^{2OT}	3,013
October 29	12:30 p.m.	Princeton	Schoellkopf Field; Ithaca, NY	OWSPN	L 7–56	4,879
November 5	1:30 p.m.	Dartmouth	Schoellkopf Field; Ithaca, NY (rivalry)	ILDN	L 13–17	3,783
November 12	1:00 p.m.	at Columbia	Robert K. Kraft Field at Lawrence A. Wien Stadium; New York, NY (rivalry)	ILDN	W 42–40	5,887
November 19	12:00 p.m.	Penn	Schoellkopf Field; Ithaca, NY (rivalry)	FCS	L 20–42	6,333
*Non-conference game; ^{†}Homecoming; Rankings from STATS Poll released prior to the game; All times are in Eastern time

== Game summaries ==
=== Bucknell ===
Cornell vs. Bucknell – Game summary

Quarter	1	2	3	4	Total
Cornell	0	10	14	0	24
Bucknell	7	3	6	0	16

at Christy Mathewson–Memorial Stadium

- Date: September 17
- Game time: 6:00 p.m. EDT
- Game weather: 76 °F (24 °C); cloudy
- Game attendance: 4,628
- Referee: J. Gansiejewski
- TV: CI
- Box Score

Game information

First quarter

- BUCK – Joey DeFloria, 1 yard run, Jack Chambers XP good, 8:38 (BUCK 7–0)

Second quarter

- BUCK – Chambers, 21 yard field goal, 11:24 (BUCK 10–0)
- COR – Zach Mays, 41 yard field goal, 6:24 (BUCK 10–3)
- COR – Dalton Banks, 10 yard run, Mays XP good, 0:28 (TIE 10–10)

Third quarter

- BUCK – DeFloria, 1 yard run, Chambers XP blocked, 11:29 (BUCK 16–10)
- COR – Banks, 1 yard run, Mays XP good, 7:05 (COR 17–16)
- COR – Matt Sullivan, 22 yard pass from Banks, Mays XP good, 0:16 (COR 24–16)

=== Yale ===
Yale vs. Cornell – Game summary

Quarter	1	2	3	4	Total
Yale	0	3	7	3	13
Cornell	14	10	0	3	27

at Schoellkopf Field

- Date: September 24
- Game time: 3:00 p.m. EDT
- Game weather: 62 °F (17 °C); mostly sunny
- Game attendance: 15,493
- Referee: J. Gansiejewski
- TV: Ivy League Digital Network
- Box Score

Game information

First quarter

- COR – J.D. PicKell, 1 yard run, Zach Mays XP good, 7:59 (COR 7–0)
- COR – Marshall Deutz, 10 yard pass from Dalton Banks, Mays XP good, 3:52 (COR 14–0)

Second quarter

- YALE – Alex Galland, 38 yard field goal, 9:15 (COR 14–3)
- COR – Ben Rogers, 43 yard pass from Banks, Mays XP good, 8:18 (COR 21–3)
- COR – Mays, 37 yard field goal, 0:00 (COR 24–3)

Third quarter

- YALE – Deshawn Salter, 3 yard run, Galland XP good, 10:08 (COR 24–10)

Fourth quarter

- COR – Mays, 28 yard field goal, 11:06 (COR 27–10)
- YALE – Galland, 23 yard field goal, 4:34 (COR 27–13)

=== Colgate ===
Cornell vs. Colgate – Game summary

Quarter	1	2	3	4	Total
Cornell	0	12	21	6	39
Colgate	21	10	7	0	38

at Andy Kerr Stadium

- Date: October 1
- Game time: 1:00 p.m. EDT
- Game weather: 62 °F (17 °C); overcast
- Game attendance: 8,010
- Referee: J. Pumphrey
- TV: TWCSC
- Box Score

Game information

First quarter

- COL – John Maddaluna, 93 yard pass from Jake Melville, Jonah Bowman XP good, 10:46 (COL 7–0)
- COL – Maddaluna, 51 yard pass from Melville, Bowman XP good, 9:02 (COL 14–0)
- COL – K. Washington, 9 yard run, Bowman XP good, 1:01 (COL 21–0)

Second quarter

- COR – 4 yard safety, 13:49 (COL 21–2)
- COR – Zach Mays, 29 yard field goal, 3:42 (COL 21–5)
- COL – Maddaluna, 43 yard pass from Melville, Bowman XP good, 6:20 (COL 28–5)
- COR – Collin Shaw, 70 yard pass from Dalton Banks, Mays XP good, 6:02 (COL 28–12)
- COL – Bowman, 19 yard field goal, 0:00 (COL 31–12)

Third quarter

- COR – Banks, 5 yard run, Mays XP good, 12:06 (COL 31–19)
- COL – Washington, 2 yard run, Bowman XP good, 5:11 (COL 38–19)
- COR – Nick Bland, 21 yard pass from Banks, Mays XP good, 3:10 (COL 38–26)
- COR – James Hubbard, 63 yard pass from Banks, Mays XP good, 0:13 (COL 38–33)

Fourth quarter

- COR – Shaw, 19 yard pass from Banks, conversion failed, 0:28 (COR 39–38)

=== Harvard ===
Cornell vs. Harvard – Game summary

Quarter	1	2	3	4	Total
Cornell	7	0	0	6	13
Harvard	14	0	9	6	29

at Harvard Stadium

- Date: October 8
- Game time: 1:00 p.m. EDT
- Game weather: 70 °F (21 °C); cloudy
- Game attendance: 11,509
- Referee: Charles Jebran
- TV: OWSPN
- Box Score

Game information

First quarter

- HAR – Anthony Firkser, 3 yard pass from Joe Viviano, Jake McIntyre XP good, 14:07 (HAR 7–0)
- COR – Ben Rogers, 41 yard pass from Dalton Banks, Nickolas Null XP good, 4:11 (TIE 7–7)
- HAR – Semar Smith, 4 yard run, McIntyre XP good, 0:00 (HAR 14–7)

Third quarter

- HAR – Smith, 6 yard run, McIntyre XP blocked, 9:19 (HAR 20–7)
- HAR – McIntyre, 31 yard field goal, 2:33 (HAR 23–7)

Fourth quarter

- HAR – Smith, 4 yard run, conversion failed, 7:28 (HAR 29–7)
- COR – Rogers, 29 yard pass from Banks, Null XP no good, 4:10 (HAR 29–13)

=== Sacred Heart ===
Sacred Heart vs. Cornell – Game summary

Quarter	1	2	3	4	Total
Sacred Heart	14	10	7	0	31
Cornell	7	3	7	7	24

at Schoellkopf Field

- Date: October 15
- Game time: 1:30 p.m. EDT
- Game weather: 64 °F (18 °C); sunny, clear
- Game attendance: 6,739
- Referee: Tom Kichline
- TV: Ivy League Digital Network
- Box Score

Game information

First quarter

- COR – Jack Gellatly, 14 yard run, Nickolas Null XP good, 6:39 (COR 7–0)
- SHU – Nate Chavious, 22 yard run, Alec Finney XP good, 6:22 (TIE 7–7)
- SHU – Chavious, 13 yard run, Finney XP good, 2:33 (SHU 14–7)

Second quarter

- SHU – Ose Imeokparia, 58 yard pass from RJ Noel, Finney XP good, 12:24 (SHU 21–7)
- COR – Null, 34 yard field goal, 7:19 (SHU 21–10)
- SHU – Finney, 36 yard field goal, 0:00 (SHU 24–10)

Third quarter

- SHU – Andrew O'Neill, 39 yard pass from Noel, Finney XP good, 7:23 (SHU 31–10)
- COR – J.D. PicKell, 2 yard run, Null XP good, 2:09 (SHU 31–17)

Fourth quarter

- COR – Dalton Banks, 1 yard run, Null XP good, 8:54 (SHU 31–24)

=== Brown ===
Cornell vs. Brown – Game summary

Quarter	1	2	3	4	OT	2OT	Total
Cornell	0	0	14	0	7	0	21
Brown	0	7	7	0	7	7	28

at Brown Stadium

- Date: October 22
- Game time: Noon EDT
- Game weather: 60 °F (16 °C); rain showers
- Game attendance: 3,013
- Referee: Michael Sechris
- TV: FCS
- Box Score

Game information

Second quarter

- BRWN – Alex Jett, 79 yard punt return, Jake Hall XP good, 0:45 (BRWN 7–0)

Third quarter

- BRWN – Jett, 18 yard pass from Thomas Linta, Hall XP good, 13:20 (BRWN 14–0)
- COR – Matt Sullivan, 9 yard pass from Dalton Banks, Nickolas Null XP good, 9:15 (BRWN 14–7)
- COR – Ben Rogers, 5 yard pass from Banks, Null XP good, 3:21 (TIE 14–14)

Overtime

- COR – Marshall Deutz, 13 yard pass from Banks, Null XP good (COR 21–14)
- BRWN – Jette, 2 yard pass from Linta, Hall XP good (TIE 21–21)

Double overtime

- BRWN – Johnny Pena, 1 yard run, Hall XP good (BRWN 28–21)

=== Princeton ===
Princeton vs. Cornell – Game summary

Quarter	1	2	3	4	Total
Princeton	14	21	14	7	56
Cornell	0	0	7	0	7

at Schoellkopf Field

- Date: October 29
- Game time: 12:30 p.m. EDT
- Game weather: 61 °F (16 °C); mostly cloudy
- Game attendance: 4,879
- Referee: Hank Johns
- TV: OWSPN
- Box Score

Game information

First quarter

- PRIN – John Lovett, 3 yard run, Tavish Rice XP good, 4:19 (PRIN 7–0)
- PRIN – Trevor Osborne, 35 yard pass from Lovett, Rice XP good, 2:03 (PRIN 14–0)

Second quarter

- PRIN – J. Frusciante, 2 yard pass from Lovett, Rice XP good, 14:42 (PRIN 21–0)
- PRIN – Lovett, 10 yard run, Rice XP good, 5:34 (PRIN 28–0)
- PRIN – Lovett, 7 yard pass from Chad Kanoff, Rice XP good, 2:25 (PRIN 35–0)

Third quarter

- COR – Ben Rogers, 15 yard pass from Dalton Banks, Nickolas Null XP good, 11:03 (PRIN 35–7)
- PRIN – Isaiah Barnes, 95 yard pass from Lovett, Rice XP good, 10:06 (PRIN 42–7)
- PRIN – G. Adomitis, 6 yard pass from Lovett, Rice XP good, 0:31 (PRIN 49–7)

Fourth quarter

- PRIN – Ryan Quigley, 50 yard run, Rice XP good, 0:55 (PRIN 56–7)

=== Dartmouth ===
Dartmouth vs. Cornell – Game summary

Quarter	1	2	3	4	Total
Dartmouth	0	3	0	14	17
Cornell	6	0	7	0	13

at Schoellkopf Field

- Date: November 5
- Game time: 1:30 p.m. EDT
- Game weather: 61 °F (16 °C); mostly cloudy
- Game attendance: 3,783
- Referee: Steve Cadorette
- TV: Ivy League Digital Network
- Box Score

Game information

First quarter

- COR – Nickolas Null, 20 yard field goal, 9:24 (COR 3–0)
- COR – Null, 22 yard field goal, 1:06 (COR 6–0)

Second quarter

- DART – David Smith, 32 yard field goal, 10:55 (COR 6–3)

Third quarter

- COR – Hayes Nolte, 4 yard pass from Dalton Banks, Null XP good, 4:26 (COR 13–3)

Fourth quarter

- DART – Miles Smith, 1 yard run, Smith XP good, 10:27 (COR 13–10)
- DART – Charles Mack, 7 yard pass from Jack Heneghan, Smith XP good, 6:42 (DART 17–13)

=== Columbia ===
Cornell vs. Columbia – Game summary

Quarter	1	2	3	4	Total
Cornell	14	7	7	14	42
Columbia	14	10	3	13	40

at Wien Stadium

- Date: November 12
- Game time: 1:30 p.m. EDT
- Game weather: 49 °F (9 °C); clear skies
- Game attendance: 5,887
- Referee: Karlton Derrick
- TV: Ivy League Digital Network
- Box Score

Game information

First quarter

- COR – Chris Walker, 27 yard run, Nickolas Null XP good, 13:25 (COR 7–0)
- COL – J. Wainwright, 33 yard pass from Anders Hill, Oren Milstein XP good, 11:39 (TIE 7–7)
- COL – Tanner Thomas, 2 yard run, Milstein XP good, 7:25 (COL 14–7)
- COR – Ben Rogers, 47 yard pass from Dalton Banks, Null XP good (TIE 14–14)

Second quarter

- COL – H. Petlansky, 18 yard run, Milstein XP good, 2:31 (COL 21–14)
- COR – Chris Walker, 28 yard run, Null XP good, 1:32 (TIE 21–21)
- COL – Milstein, 44 yard field goal, 0:04 (COL 24–21)

Third quarter

- COR – Hayes Nolte, 14 yard pass from Banks, Null XP good, 4:52 (COR 28–24)
- COL – Milstein, 37 yard field goal, 1:44 (COR 28–27)

Fourth quarter

- COR – Banks, 1 yard run, Null XP good, 9:27 (COR 35–27)
- COL – Lynnard Rose, 13 yard pass from Hill, conversion no good, 6:26 (COR 35–33)
- COR – Walker, 71 yard run, Null XP good, 4:53 (COR 42–33)
- COL – Ronald Smith, 11 yard pass from Hill, Milstein XP good, 1:58 (COR 42–40)

=== Penn ===
Penn vs. Cornell – Game summary

Quarter	1	2	3	4	Total
Penn	14	14	7	7	42
Cornell	6	7	0	7	20

at Schoellkopf Field

- Date: November 19
- Game time: Noon EDT
- Game weather: 56 °F (13 °C); sunny
- Game attendance: 6,333
- TV: Fox College Sports
- Box Score

Game information

First quarter

- PENN – Tre Solomon, 1 yard run, Jimmy Gammill XP good, 6:52 (PENN 7–0)
- COR – Collin Shaw, 35 yard pass from Dalton Banks, Nicholas Null XP no good, 6:02 (PENN 7–6)
- PENN – C. Pearson, 22 yard pass from Alek Torgersen, Gammill XP good, 0:23 (PENN 14–6)

Second quarter

- PENN – Torgersen, 5 yard run, Gammill XP good, 5:43 (PENN 21–6)
- COR – Chris Walker, 58 yard pass from Ben Rogers, Null XP good, 3:38 (PENN 21–13)
- PENN – Solomon, 1 yard run, Gammill XP good, 0:02 (PENN 28–13)

Third quarter

- PENN – Nick Demes, 7 yard run, Gammill XP good, 6:51 (PENN 35–13)

Fourth quarter

- COR – Marshall Deutz, 17 yard pass from Banks, Null XP good, 13:59 (PENN 35–20)
- PENN – Torgersen, 1 yard run, Gammill XP good, 4:53 (PENN 42–20)
