= 2016 Princeton Tigers football team =

American college football season

2016 Princeton Tigers football

Ivy League co-champion
- Conference: Ivy League
- Record: 8–2 (6–1 Ivy)
- Head coach: Bob Surace (7th season)
- Offensive coordinator: James Perry (7th season)
- Offensive scheme: Spread option
- Co-defensive coordinators: Steve Verbit (4th season); Jim Salgado (4th season)
- Base defense: 3–3–5 or 4–2–5
- Home stadium: Powers Field at Princeton Stadium

2016 Ivy League football standings
	Conf.			Overall
Team	W		L	W		L
Princeton +	6	–	1	8	–	2
Penn +	6	–	1	7	–	3
Harvard	5	–	2	7	–	3
Brown	3	–	4	4	–	6
Yale	3	–	4	3	–	7
Cornell	2	–	5	4	–	6
Columbia	2	–	5	3	–	7
Dartmouth	1	–	6	4	–	6
+ – Conference co-champions

The 2016 Princeton Tigers football team represented Princeton University in the 2016 NCAA Division I FCS football season. They were led by seventh-year head coach Bob Surace and played their home games at Powers Field at Princeton Stadium. Princeton is a member of the Ivy League. They finished the season 8–2 overall and 6–1 in Ivy League play to tie with Penn for the Ivy League title, their first since 2013. Princeton averaged 8,990 fans per game.

== Schedule ==
Date	Time	Opponent	Site	TV	Result	Attendance
September 17	5:00 p.m.	Lafayette*	Powers Field at Princeton Stadium; Princeton, NJ	ESPN3	W 35–31	13,420
September 24	12:30 p.m.	at Lehigh*	Goodman Stadium; Bethlehem, PA	CI	L 28–42	5,493
October 1	12:00 p.m.	at Columbia	Robert K. Kraft Field at Lawrence A. Wien Stadium; New York, NY	FCS	W 48–13	3,638
October 8	1:00 p.m.	at Georgetown*	Cooper Field; Washington, DC	CI	W 31–17	2,263
October 15	3:00 p.m.	Brown	Powers Field at Princeton Stadium; Princeton, NJ	ILDN	W 31–7	5,881
October 22	1:00 p.m.	Harvard	Powers Field at Princeton Stadium; Princeton, NJ (rivalry)	ILDN	L 20–23 ^{OT}	9,963
October 29	12:30 p.m.	at Cornell	Schoellkopf Field; Ithaca, NY	OWSPN	W 56–7	4,879
November 5	12:00 p.m.	Penn	Powers Field at Princeton Stadium; Princeton, NJ (rivalry)	ASN	W 28–0	7,367
November 12	12:30 p.m.	at Yale	Yale Bowl; New Haven, CT (rivalry)	ILDN	W 31–3	15,321
November 19	1:30 p.m.	Dartmouth	Powers Field at Princeton Stadium; Princeton, NJ	OWSPN	W 38–21	8,320
*Non-conference game; All times are in Eastern time

== Game summaries ==
=== Lafayette ===
	1	2	3	4	Total
Leopards	14	7	3	7	31
Tigers	7	14	14	0	35

=== At Lehigh ===
	1	2	3	4	Total
Tigers	7	7	0	14	28
Mountain Hawks	7	14	14	7	42

=== At Columbia ===
	1	2	3	4	Total
Tigers	6	28	14	0	48
Lions	6	0	0	7	13

=== At Georgetown ===
	1	2	3	4	Total
Tigers	14	7	10	0	31
Hoyas	7	7	3	0	17

=== Brown ===
	1	2	3	4	Total
Bears	0	0	0	7	7
Tigers	14	14	3	0	31

=== Harvard ===
	1	2	3	4	OT	Total
Crimson	7	7	0	3	6	23
Tigers	0	0	10	7	3	20

=== At Cornell ===
	1	2	3	4	Total
Tigers	14	21	14	7	56
Big Red	0	0	7	0	7

=== Penn ===
	1	2	3	4	Total
Quakers	0	0	0	0	0
Tigers	6	7	8	7	28

=== At Yale ===
	1	2	3	4	Total
Tigers	7	10	0	14	31
Bulldogs	3	0	0	0	3

=== Dartmouth ===
	1	2	3	4	Total
Big Green	7	7	0	7	21
Tigers	7	3	7	21	38
