= 2016 Brown Bears football team =

American college football season

2016 Brown Bears football
- Conference: Ivy League
- Record: 4–6 (3–4 Ivy)
- Head coach: Phil Estes (19th season)
- Offensive coordinator: Frank Sheehan (11th season)
- Offensive scheme: Pro-style
- Defensive coordinator: Michael Kelleher (16th season)
- Base defense: 4–3
- Home stadium: Brown Stadium

2016 Ivy League football standings
| | Conf. | | | Overall |
| Team | W | | L | W | | L |
|---|---|---|---|---|---|---|
| Princeton + | 6 | – | 1 | 8 | – | 2 |
| Penn + | 6 | – | 1 | 7 | – | 3 |
| Harvard | 5 | – | 2 | 7 | – | 3 |
| Brown | 3 | – | 4 | 4 | – | 6 |
| Yale | 3 | – | 4 | 3 | – | 7 |
| Cornell | 2 | – | 5 | 4 | – | 6 |
| Columbia | 2 | – | 5 | 3 | – | 7 |
| Dartmouth | 1 | – | 6 | 4 | – | 6 |
+ – Conference co-champions

The 2016 Brown Bears football team represented Brown University as a member of the Ivy League during the 2016 NCAA Division I FCS football season. Led by 19th-year head coach Phil Estes, the Bears compiled an overall record of 4–6 with a mark of 3–4 in conference play, tying for fourth place in the Ivy League. Brown played home games at Brown Stadium in Providence, Rhode Island.

== Schedule ==
| Date | Time | Opponent | Site | TV | Result | Attendance |
|---|---|---|---|---|---|---|
| September 17 | 1:00 p.m. | at Bryant* | Bulldog Stadium; Smithfield, RI | NECFR | W 35–27 | 4,116 |
| September 24 | 2:00 p.m. | Harvard | Brown Stadium; Providence, RI | OWSPN | L 22–32 | 8,174 |
| October 1 | 12:00 p.m. | at Rhode Island* | Meade Stadium; Kingston, RI (rivalry) | A10 Network | L 13–28 | 5,102 |
| October 8 | 12:30 p.m. | Stetson* | Brown Stadium; Providence, RI | ILDN | L 21–31 | 3,540 |
| October 15 | 3:00 p.m. | at Princeton | Powers Field at Princeton Stadium; Princeton, NJ | ILDN | L 7–31 | 5,881 |
| October 22 | 12:00 p.m. | Cornell | Brown Stadium; Providence, RI | FCS | W 28–21 ^{2OT} | 3,013 |
| October 29 | 1:00 p.m. | at Penn | Franklin Field; Philadelphia, PA | ILDN | L 14–21 | 8,047 |
| November 5 | 12:30 p.m. | Yale | Brown Stadium; Providence, RI | ILDN | W 27–22 | 4,229 |
| November 12 | 12:00 p.m. | at Dartmouth | Memorial Stadium; Hanover, NH | OWSPN | W 24–21 | 3,826 |
| November 19 | 12:30 p.m. | Columbia | Brown Stadium; Providence, RI | ILDN | L 13–31 | 3,139 |
*Non-conference game; All times are in Eastern time
