= 2016 Fordham Rams football team =

American college football season

2016 Fordham Rams football
- Conference: Patriot League
- Record: 8–3 (5–1 Patriot)
- Head coach: Andrew Breiner (1st season)
- Offensive coordinator: Tyler Bowen (1st season)
- Defensive coordinator: Jon Wholley (3rd season)
- Home stadium: Coffey Field

2016 Patriot League football standings
	Conf.			Overall
Team	W		L	W		L
No. 21 Lehigh $^	6	–	0	9	–	3
Fordham	5	–	1	8	–	3
Colgate	4	–	2	5	–	5
Bucknell	3	–	3	4	–	7
Holy Cross	2	–	4	4	–	7
Lafayette	1	–	5	2	–	9
Georgetown	0	–	6	3	–	8
$ – Conference champion; ^ – FCS playoff participant; Rankings from STATS Poll

The 2016 Fordham Rams football team represented Fordham University as a member of the Patriot League during the 2016 NCAA Division I FCS football season. Led by first-year head coach Andrew Breiner, the Rams compiled an overall record of 8–3 with a mark of 5–1 in conference play, placing second in the Patriot League. Fordham played home games at Coffey Field in The Bronx.

== Schedule ==
Date	Time	Opponent	Site	TV	Result	Attendance
September 3	12:00 pm	at Navy*	Navy–Marine Corps Memorial Stadium; Annapolis, MD	CBSSN	L 16–52	28,238
September 10	1:00 pm	Elizabeth City State*	Coffey Field; Bronx, NY	PLN	W 83–21	3,626
September 24	1:00 pm	Penn*	Coffey Field; Bronx, NY	PLN	W 31–17	7,816
October 1	1:00 pm	at Monmouth*	Kessler Field; West Long Branch, NJ	ESPN3	L 41–42 ^{OT}	2,847
October 8	1:00 pm	Lafayette	Coffey Field; Bronx, NY	PLN	W 58–34	3,864
October 15	1:00 pm	Yale*	Coffey Field; Bronx, NY	PLN	W 44–37	4,671
October 22	1:00 pm	Georgetown	Coffey Field; Bronx, NY	PLN	W 17–14	8,231
October 29	12:30 pm	at Lehigh	Goodman Stadium; Bethlehem, PA	PLN	L 37–58	6,009
November 5	1:00 pm	Colgate	Coffey Field; Bronx, NY	PLN	W 24–20	4,285
November 12	3:00 pm	vs. Holy Cross	Yankee Stadium; Bronx, NY (Ram–Crusader Cup)	PLN	W 54–14	21,375
November 19	12:00 pm	at Bucknell	Christy Mathewson–Memorial Stadium; Lewisburg, PA	ASN	W 36–22	2,079
*Non-conference game; All times are in Eastern time

== Game summaries ==
=== At Navy ===
	1	2	3	4	Total
Rams	10	0	3	3	16
Midshipmen	21	14	14	3	52

=== Elizabeth City State ===
	1	2	3	4	Total
Vikings	0	14	7	0	21
Rams	38	10	14	21	83

=== Penn ===
	1	2	3	4	Total
Quakers	7	3	7	0	17
Rams	14	10	0	7	31

=== At Monmouth ===
	1	2	3	4	OT	Total
Rams	13	14	0	7	7	41
Hawks	3	10	7	14	8	42

=== Lafayette ===
	1	2	3	4	Total
Leopards	17	3	7	7	34
Rams	20	21	10	7	58

=== Yale ===
	1	2	3	4	Total
Bulldogs	8	7	8	14	37
Rams	14	13	14	3	44

=== Georgetown ===
	1	2	3	4	Total
Hoyas	7	7	0	0	14
Rams	14	0	0	3	17

=== At Lehigh ===
	1	2	3	4	Total
Rams	6	3	7	21	37
Mountain Hawks	16	21	14	7	58

=== Colgate ===
	1	2	3	4	Total
Raiders	7	7	6	0	20
Rams	3	7	7	7	24

=== Vs. Holy Cross ===
	1	2	3	4	Total
Rams	21	19	7	7	54
Crusaders	0	7	7	0	14

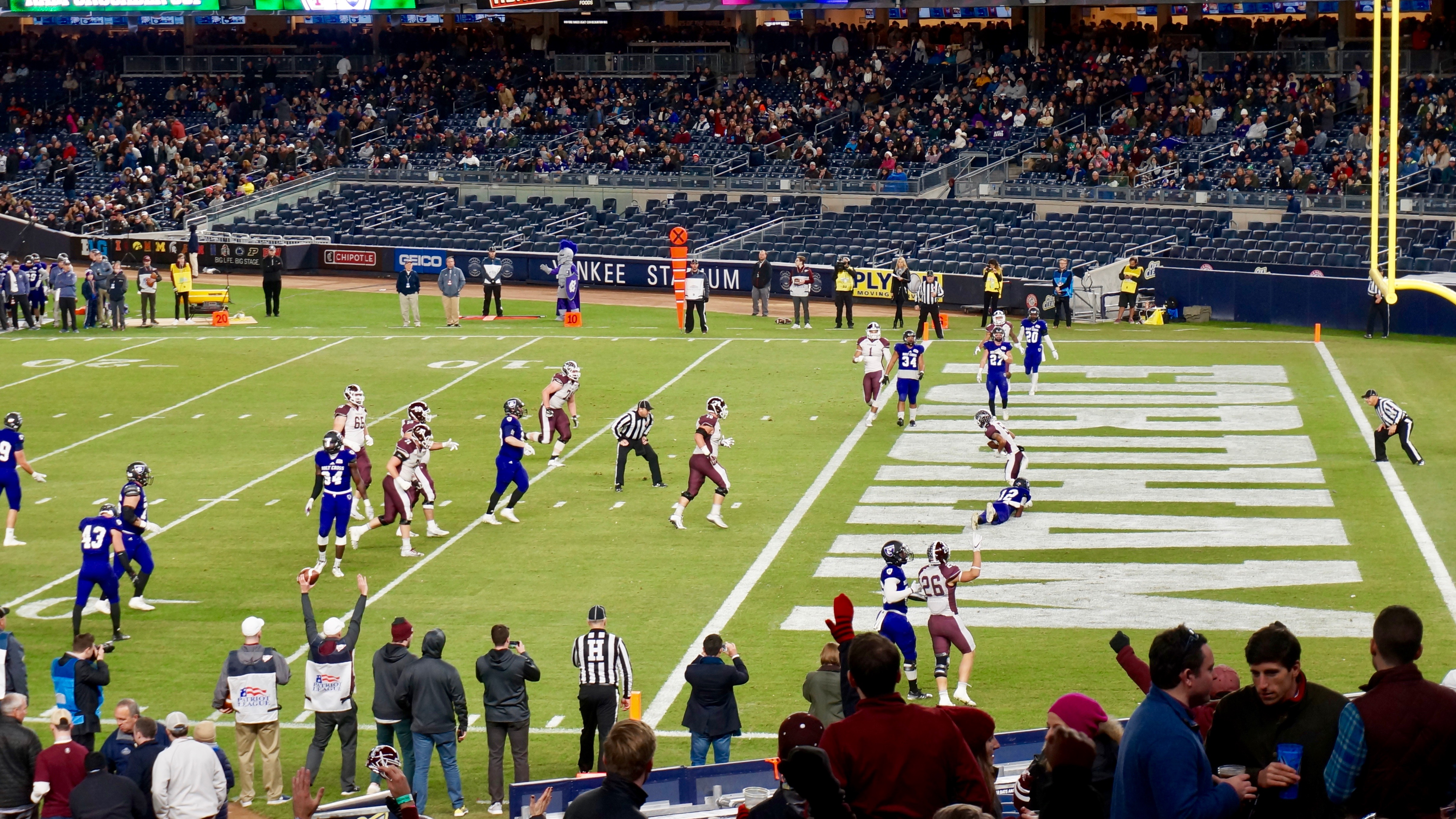
Fordham vs. Holy Cross (at Yankee Stadium)

=== At Bucknell ===
	1	2	3	4	Total
Rams	7	14	0	15	36
Bison	7	2	6	7	22

== Ranking movements ==
Ranking movements Legend: ██ Increase in ranking ██ Decrease in ranking — = Not ranked RV = Received votes
	Week													
Poll	Pre	1	2	3	4	5	6	7	8	9	10	11	12	Final
STATS FCS	RV	RV	RV	RV	RV	RV	RV	RV						
Coaches	20	25	RV	RV	RV	—	—	—						
