= 2016 Georgetown Hoyas football team =

American college football season

2016 Georgetown Hoyas football
- Conference: Patriot League
- Record: 3–8 (0–6 Patriot)
- Head coach: Rob Sgarlata (3rd season)
- Offensive coordinator: Michael Neuberger (3rd season)
- Defensive coordinator: Luke Thompson (3rd season)
- Home stadium: Cooper Field

2016 Patriot League football standings
| | Conf. | | | Overall |
| Team | W | | L | W | | L |
|---|---|---|---|---|---|---|
| No. 21 Lehigh $^ | 6 | – | 0 | 9 | – | 3 |
| Fordham | 5 | – | 1 | 8 | – | 3 |
| Colgate | 4 | – | 2 | 5 | – | 5 |
| Bucknell | 3 | – | 3 | 4 | – | 7 |
| Holy Cross | 2 | – | 4 | 4 | – | 7 |
| Lafayette | 1 | – | 5 | 2 | – | 9 |
| Georgetown | 0 | – | 6 | 3 | – | 8 |
$ – Conference champion; ^ – FCS playoff participant; Rankings from STATS Poll

The 2016 Georgetown Hoyas football team represented Georgetown University as a member of the Patriot League during the 2016 NCAA Division I FCS football season. Led by third-year head coach Rob Sgarlata, the Hoyas compiled an overall record of 3–8 with a mark of 0–6 in conference play, placing last out of seven teams in the Patriot League. Georgetown played home games at Cooper Field in Washington, D.C.

== Schedule ==
| Date | Time | Opponent | Site | TV | Result | Attendance |
|---|---|---|---|---|---|---|
| September 3 | 1:00 pm | Davidson* | Cooper Field; Washington, DC | PLN | W 38–14 | 1,863 |
| September 10 | 6:00 pm | at Marist* | Tenney Stadium at Leonidoff Field; Poughkeepsie, NY | | W 20–17 | 2,133 |
| September 24 | 2:00 pm | Columbia* | Cooper Field; Washington, DC (Lou Little Cup) | PLN | W 17–14 | 2,367 |
| September 30 | 7:00 pm | at No. 25 Harvard* | Harvard Stadium; Boston, MA | ESPN3 | L 17–31 | 7,138 |
| October 8 | 1:00 pm | Princeton* | Cooper Field; Washington, DC | PLN | L 17–31 | 2,263 |
| October 15 | 2:00 pm | Lehigh | Cooper Field; Washington, DC | PLN | L 3–35 | 2,455 |
| October 22 | 1:00 pm | at Fordham | Coffey Field; Bronx, NY | PLN | L 14–17 | 8,231 |
| October 29 | 12:30 pm | at Lafayette | Fisher Stadium; Easton, PA | PLN, WBPH-TV | L 3–17 | 4,878 |
| November 5 | 1:00 pm | Holy Cross | Cooper Field; Washington, DC | PLN | L 20–21 | 1,710 |
| November 12 | 3:30 pm | Bucknell | Cooper Field; Washington, DC | PLN | L 7–21 | 1,371 |
| November 19 | 1:00 pm | at Colgate | Crown Field at Andy Kerr Stadium; Hamilton, NY | PLN | L 10–38 | 4,223 |
*Non-conference game; Rankings from STATS Poll released prior to the game; All times are in Eastern time

== Game summaries ==
=== Davidson ===
| | 1 | 2 | 3 | 4 | Total |
|---|---|---|---|---|---|
| Wildcats | 0 | 7 | 0 | 7 | 14 |
| Hoyas | 0 | 17 | 21 | 0 | 38 |

=== At Marist ===
| | 1 | 2 | 3 | 4 | Total |
|---|---|---|---|---|---|
| Hoyas | 3 | 3 | 7 | 7 | 20 |
| Red Foxes | 10 | 0 | 7 | 0 | 17 |

=== Columbia ===
| | 1 | 2 | 3 | 4 | Total |
|---|---|---|---|---|---|
| Lions | 0 | 0 | 7 | 7 | 14 |
| Hoyas | 10 | 7 | 0 | 0 | 17 |

=== At Harvard ===
| | 1 | 2 | 3 | 4 | Total |
|---|---|---|---|---|---|
| Hoyas | 7 | 0 | 0 | 10 | 17 |
| #25 Crimson | 14 | 10 | 0 | 7 | 31 |

=== Princeton ===
| | 1 | 2 | 3 | 4 | Total |
|---|---|---|---|---|---|
| Tigers | 14 | 7 | 10 | 0 | 31 |
| Hoyas | 7 | 7 | 3 | 0 | 17 |

=== Lehigh ===
| | 1 | 2 | 3 | 4 | Total |
|---|---|---|---|---|---|
| Mountain Hawks | 7 | 7 | 14 | 7 | 35 |
| Hoyas | 0 | 3 | 0 | 0 | 3 |

=== At Fordham ===
| | 1 | 2 | 3 | 4 | Total |
|---|---|---|---|---|---|
| Hoyas | 7 | 7 | 0 | 0 | 14 |
| Rams | 14 | 0 | 0 | 3 | 17 |

=== At Lafayette ===
| | 1 | 2 | 3 | 4 | Total |
|---|---|---|---|---|---|
| Hoyas | 0 | 3 | 0 | 0 | 3 |
| Leopards | 3 | 0 | 14 | 0 | 17 |

=== Holy Cross ===
| | 1 | 2 | 3 | 4 | Total |
|---|---|---|---|---|---|
| Crusaders | 14 | 7 | 0 | 0 | 21 |
| Hoyas | 7 | 10 | 3 | 0 | 20 |

=== Bucknell ===
| | 1 | 2 | 3 | 4 | Total |
|---|---|---|---|---|---|
| Bison | 0 | 7 | 7 | 7 | 21 |
| Hoyas | 0 | 0 | 7 | 0 | 7 |

=== At Colgate ===
| | 1 | 2 | 3 | 4 | Total |
|---|---|---|---|---|---|
| Hoyas | 0 | 3 | 0 | 7 | 10 |
| Raiders | 7 | 14 | 10 | 7 | 38 |
