= John Andariese =

American basketball broadcaster (1938–2017)

- Born: August 19, 1938; Brooklyn, New York, U.S.
- Died: March 13, 2017 (aged 78); West Palm Beach, Florida, U.S.
- Other name: "Johnny Hoops"
- Education: Fordham University
- Occupations: Sports commentator and analyst, TV sports show host, businessman, athlete
- Years active: 1956–2012
- Spouses: Judith M. Andariese; Maureen Hayden Andariese
- Children: 3 daughters, Amy, Julie, and Emily
- Parent(s): Harold Andariese and Mary Ellen Burns

John Kenneth Andariese (August 19, 1938 – March 13, 2017), nicknamed "Johnny Hoops", was a New York basketball analyst on both radio and television for more than 40 years. Andariese broadcast for the New York Knicks and announced some of the most memorable Knicks games ever played. He also is well known for hosting NBA Legends with Johnny Hoops on NBA TV.

== Playing career ==
Andariese played college basketball for the Fordham Rams under coach Johnny Bach from 1956 to 1960. He was a three time All-City player during those years. Andariese led his team to two National Invitational Tournaments and was team captain during his senior year at Fordham. In his senior year, he averaged 13.0 points and 8.7 rebounds per game.

== After graduation ==
Andariese was a star player during his college days. After graduating from Fordham, he served in the U.S. Army, and later played for the Allentown Jets of the Eastern Professional Basketball League.

== Broadcasting career ==
Andariese's broadcasting career began with college games in the 1968–69 season before he joined the Knicks as a radio analyst for the 1972–73 season, where he teamed with Marv Albert, who had been calling the play-by-play since 1967. He was paired with Albert through the 1976–1977 season, and again from 1982 to 1986 and 1998 to 2004, and is well represented on the list of New York Knicks broadcasters in both radio and television.

=== National work ===
In 1983, Andariese became the first color commentator for the NBA on ESPN. When ESPN lost its NBA contract, he joined the NBA on TBS, where he broadcast games nationally from 1984 to 1986. He was part of TBS' coverage of the 1985 and 1986 NBA Eastern Conference finals with Skip Caray. He also spent ten years as a college basketball analyst for NBC Sports. Andariese was also one of the first collegiate basketball color analysts for ESPN. He later became co-host of NBA2Night with Greg Gumbel. Unlike most NBA analysts, he never played or coached professionally.

=== Return to the Knicks' broadcasting team ===
Andariese rejoined the Knicks' television broadcasting team in 1986 as the team's analyst on the MSG Network. He remained on the Knicks television broadcasts until 1998, when he was replaced by radio analyst Walt Frazier. This allowed Andariese to reunite with Albert on the Knicks' radio broadcasts. Andariese also worked alongside Gus Johnson. For the 2010–11 season, he began working with Mike Crispino. Andariese was a key part of the Knicks' coverage, and was known for announcing some of the most memorable moments in Knicks basketball. He retired in 2012.

=== Television broadcasting ===
- 1986–89 – MSG Network/WWOR-TV color commentator John Andariese with play-by-play Marv Albert
- 1989–97 – MSG Network color commentator John Andariese with play-by-play Marv Albert
- 1997–98 – MSG Network color commentator John Andariese with play-by-play Mike Breen

=== Radio broadcasting ===
- 1972–74 – WNBC-FM – John Andariese and Marv Albert
- 1974–76 – WNEW – John Andariese and Marv Albert
- 1982–84 – WNEW – John Andariese and Marv Albert
- 1984–85 – WPAT – John Andariese and Marv Albert
- 1985–86 – WNBC – John Andariese and Marv Albert
- 1998–2000 – WFAN – John Andariese and Marv Albert
- 2000–04 – WFAN – John Andariese and Mike Breen
- 2004–05 – WFAN – John Andariese and Gus Johnson
- 2005–10 – WEPN – John Andariese and Gus Johnson
- 2010–14 – WEPN-FM – John Andriese and Spero Dedes

== Business career ==
Andariese was the chief executive officer and founder of TViMedia, an advertising sales company based in Manhattan, New York.

== Awards ==
Andariese was inducted into the Fordham Basketball Hall of Fame in 1978, the New York City Basketball Hall of Fame in 2009 and The Naismith Memorial Basketball Hall of Fame as a Curt Gowdy Award winner of 2014. Andariese died on March 13, 2017, at age 78.

== Quotes ==
"After what seems like a lifetime behind the microphone and having the good fortune and privilege to be part of nearly 40 years of Knicks' history, I've decided it's time to step away to spend time with my wonderful wife Maureen, my three beautiful daughters and my four grandchildren... I've been blessed to be able to cover one of the greatest sports teams on the planet, one with the most knowledgeable and passionate fans. It's now time to shift my focus to my family and my position as CEO of TVI Media. I'm grateful to MSG Networks and the Knicks for giving me this wonderful opportunity and for all of the love and affection shown to me by our New York basketball savvy fans, who have been such an important part of my life. I'm pleased beyond words to have been able to share my enthusiasm and passion for Knicks basketball with them. I'll miss you all."
