= Andy Musser =

American sportscaster

- Born: Andrew J. Musser Jr. December 28, 1937; Lemoyne, Pennsylvania, U.S.
- Died: January 22, 2012 (aged 74); Wynnewood, Pennsylvania, U.S.
- Education: Syracuse University
- Occupation: Sportscaster

Andrew J. Musser Jr. (December 28, 1937 – January 22, 2012) was an American sportscaster. He is best known for his time as a play-by-play announcer for Philadelphia Phillies baseball from 1976 to 2001.

== Early life and education ==
Born in Lemoyne, Pennsylvania he grew up in nearby Harrisburg. He received a Bachelor of Arts in communications from Syracuse University in 1959.

== Career ==
Musser, Richie Ashburn, and Harry Kalas formed a broadcast team that covered Phillies games on both radio and television for 21 consecutive seasons from 1976 to 1997. He retired after the 2001 season.

Musser worked for WCAU radio and television in Philadelphia from 1965 to 1971. During this time, he served as a radio play-by-play announcer for Eagles football, as well as 76ers and Villanova Wildcats basketball. One of the youngest lead broadcasters in the National Football League at the time, he covered the Eagles' games with Charlie Gauer for four years until the station lost the broadcast rights to WIP in 1969. Musser also called various events nationally for CBS Radio, including Super Bowl VI, Super Bowl VIII and the 1976 MLB All-Star Game.

Musser was the lead voice for Chicago Bulls telecasts on WSNS from 1973 through 1976, pairing with Dick Gonski in the first two seasons and Lorn Brown in the third. He also called New York Knicks away games with Cal Ramsey on WOR-TV and Manhattan Cable Television home games for the next four seasons from 1976 to 1980. He handled all the games in the first three years, but only home games in the fourth year.

The Broadcast Pioneers of Philadelphia inducted Musser into their Hall of Fame in November 2011.

== Personal life ==
Musser was married to Eun Joo for 50 years. They had two children, Allan and Luanne and four grandchildren. Musser died on January 22, 2012.

== Memorable calls ==
The pitch to Schmidt. Long drive to left field, he buried it! He buried it! Way back, out of here! Home run, Mike Schmidt, puts the Phillies up 6 to 4! Oh what a drive by Schmidt, unbelieveable!

— Mike Schmidt hits a two-run home run in the top of the 11th inning against the Montreal Expos - October 4, 1980.

The wind-up by Ruthven, the 3-2 pitch. Here's a punch-shot to center field, Maddox racing over . . . he catches the ball! Phillies win the pennant! The Phillies have won the pennant! The Phillies win the ballgame, 8 to 7, they go to the World Series for the first time in 30 years!

— Dick Ruthven's final pitch in Game 5 of the 1980 National League Championship Series against the Houston Astros.
