= 2016 Bucknell Bison football team =

American college football season

2016 Bucknell Bison football
- Conference: Patriot League
- Record: 4–7 (3–3 Patriot)
- Head coach: Joe Susan (7th season)
- Offensive coordinator: Mike O'Connor
- Defensive coordinator: Matt Borich
- Home stadium: Christy Mathewson–Memorial Stadium

2016 Patriot League football standings
	Conf.			Overall
Team	W		L	W		L
No. 21 Lehigh $^	6	–	0	9	–	3
Fordham	5	–	1	8	–	3
Colgate	4	–	2	5	–	5
Bucknell	3	–	3	4	–	7
Holy Cross	2	–	4	4	–	7
Lafayette	1	–	5	2	–	9
Georgetown	0	–	6	3	–	8
$ – Conference champion; ^ – FCS playoff participant; Rankings from STATS Poll

The 2016 Bucknell Bison football team represented Bucknell University in the 2016 NCAA Division I FCS football season. They were led by seventh-year head coach Joe Susan and played their home games at Christy Mathewson–Memorial Stadium. They were a member of the Patriot League. They finished the season 4–7, 3–3 in Patriot League play to finish in fourth place.

== Schedule ==
Date	Time	Opponent	Site	TV	Result	Attendance
September 3	6:00 pm	at Marist*	Tenney Stadium at Leonidoff Field; Poughkeepsie, NY	RFN	W 26–10	3,363
September 10	6:00 pm	at Duquesne*	Arthur J. Rooney Athletic Field; Pittsburgh, PA	NECFR	L 19–30	1,943
September 17	6:00 pm	Cornell*	Christy Mathewson–Memorial Stadium; Lewisburg, PA	PLN	L 16–24	4,628
September 24	3:00 pm	VMI*	Christy Mathewson–Memorial Stadium; Lewisburg, PA	PLN	L 17–23 ^{3OT}	4,972
October 8	1:00 pm	at Holy Cross	Fitton Field; Worcester, MA	PLN	W 21–20	6,184
October 15	1:00 pm	Colgate	Christy Mathewson–Memorial Stadium; Lewisburg, PA	PLN	L 7–27	2,793
October 22	1:00 pm	Lafayette^{†}	Christy Mathewson–Memorial Stadium; Lewisburg, PA	PLN	W 42–17	2,146
October 29	11:45 am	at No. 9 Charleston Southern*	Buccaneer Field; Charleston, SC	ESPN3	L 28–49	2,356
November 5	12:30 pm	at No. 24 Lehigh	Goodman Stadium; Bethlehem, PA	PLN	L 13–20	7,049
November 12	3:30 pm	at Georgetown	Cooper Field; Washington, DC	PLN	W 21–7	1,371
November 19	12:00 pm	Fordham	Christy Mathewson–Memorial Stadium; Lewisburg, PA	ASN	L 22–36	2,079
*Non-conference game; ^{†}Homecoming; Rankings from STATS Poll released prior to the game; All times are in Eastern time

== Game summaries ==
=== At Marist ===
	1	2	3	4	Total
Bison	7	13	0	6	26
Red Foxes	3	0	7	0	10

=== At Duquesne ===
	1	2	3	4	Total
Bison	0	0	7	12	19
Dukes	3	10	0	17	30

=== Cornell ===
	1	2	3	4	Total
Big Red	0	10	14	0	24
Bison	7	3	6	0	16

=== VMI ===
	1	2	3	4	OT	2OT	3OT	Total
Keydets	6	0	8	3	0	0	6	23
Bison	0	7	7	3	0	0	0	17

=== At Holy Cross ===
	1	2	3	4	Total
Bison	0	7	7	7	21
Crusaders	7	13	0	0	20

=== Colgate ===
	1	2	3	4	Total
Raiders	3	10	0	14	27
Bison	0	0	7	0	7

=== Lafayette ===
	1	2	3	4	Total
Leopards	3	0	14	0	17
Bison	7	7	7	21	42

=== At Charleston Southern ===
	1	2	3	4	Total
Bison	7	7	7	7	28
#9 Buccaneers	7	14	21	7	49

=== At Lehigh ===
	1	2	3	4	Total
Bison	7	6	0	0	13
#24 Mountain Hawks	7	0	13	0	20

=== At Georgetown ===
	1	2	3	4	Total
Bison	0	7	7	7	21
Hoyas	0	0	7	0	7

=== Fordham ===
	1	2	3	4	Total
Rams	7	14	0	15	36
Bison	7	2	6	7	22
