= 2016 Lafayette Leopards football team =

American college football season

2016 Lafayette Leopards football
- Conference: Patriot League
- Record: 2–9 (1–5 Patriot)
- Head coach: Frank Tavani (17th season)
- Offensive coordinator: Mickey Fein (8th season)
- Defensive coordinator: Art Link (3rd season)
- Home stadium: Fisher Stadium

2016 Patriot League football standings
	Conf.			Overall
Team	W		L	W		L
No. 21 Lehigh $^	6	–	0	9	–	3
Fordham	5	–	1	8	–	3
Colgate	4	–	2	5	–	5
Bucknell	3	–	3	4	–	7
Holy Cross	2	–	4	4	–	7
Lafayette	1	–	5	2	–	9
Georgetown	0	–	6	3	–	8
$ – Conference champion; ^ – FCS playoff participant; Rankings from STATS Poll

The 2016 Lafayette Leopards football team represented Lafayette College as member of the Patriot League during the 2016 NCAA Division I FCS football season. Led by Frank Tavani in his 17th and final season as head coach, the Leopards compiled an overall record of 2–9 with a mark of 1–5 in conference play, placing sixth in the Patriot League. Lafayette played home games at Fisher Field in Easton, Pennsylvania.

Tavani was fired after the season, on November 29. His finished his tenure at Lafayette with an overall record of 84–107.

== Schedule ==
Date	Time	Opponent	Site	TV	Result	Attendance
September 2	6:00 pm	at Central Connecticut*	Arute Field; New Britain, CT	NECFR	W 24–10	4,117
September 10	6:00 pm	Delaware*	Fisher Stadium; Easton, PA	WBPH-TV	L 6–24	6,828
September 17	5:00 pm	at Princeton*	Powers Field at Princeton Stadium; Princeton, NJ	ESPN3	L 31–35	13,420
September 24	6:00 pm	No. 19 Villanova*	Fisher Stadium; Easton, PA	WBPH-TV	L 14–31	7,441
October 1	3:30 pm	Holy Cross^{†}	Fisher Stadium; Easton, PA	WBPH-TV	L 28–38	4,948
October 8	1:00 pm	at Fordham	Coffey Field; Bronx, NY	PLN	L 34–58	3,864
October 15	12:00 pm	at Army*	Michie Stadium; West Point, NY	CBSSN	L 7–62	38,894
October 22	1:00 pm	at Bucknell	Christy Mathewson–Memorial Stadium; Lewisburg, PA	WBPH-TV	L 17–42	2,146
October 29	12:30 pm	Georgetown	Fisher Stadium; Easton, PA	WBPH-TV	W 17–3	4,878
November 12	1:00 pm	at Colgate	Crown Field at Andy Kerr Stadium; Hamilton, NY	WBPH-TV	L 17–38	4,859
November 19	12:30 pm	No. 19 Lehigh	Fisher Stadium; Easton, PA (The Rivalry)	WBPH-TV, WFMZ	L 21–45	12,587
*Non-conference game; ^{†}Homecoming; Rankings from STATS Poll released prior to the game; All times are in Eastern time

== Game summaries ==
=== At Central Connecticut ===
	1	2	3	4	Total
Leopards	10	0	0	14	24
Blue Devils	0	3	7	0	10

=== Delaware ===
	1	2	3	4	Total
Fightin' Blue Hens	3	0	7	14	24
Leopards	3	0	3	0	6

=== At Princeton ===
	1	2	3	4	Total
Leopards	14	7	3	7	31
Tigers	7	14	14	0	35

=== Villanova ===
	1	2	3	4	Total
#19 Wildcats	7	10	14	0	31
Leopards	0	7	7	0	14

=== Holy Cross ===
	1	2	3	4	Total
Crusaders	10	3	3	22	38
Leopards	0	7	14	7	28

=== At Fordham ===
	1	2	3	4	Total
Leopards	17	3	7	7	34
Rams	20	21	10	7	58

=== At Army ===
	1	2	3	4	Total
Leopards	0	7	0	0	7
Black Knights	14	21	14	13	62

=== At Bucknell ===
	1	2	3	4	Total
Leopards	3	0	14	0	17
Bison	7	7	7	21	42

=== Georgetown ===
	1	2	3	4	Total
Hoyas	0	3	0	0	3
Leopards	3	0	14	0	17

=== At Colgate ===
	1	2	3	4	Total
Leopards	0	7	10	10	27
Raiders	10	14	7	7	38

=== Lehigh ===
	1	2	3	4	Total
#19 Mountain Hawks	7	24	14	0	45
Leopards	0	7	6	8	21
