= Mike Breen =

American sportscaster (born 1961)

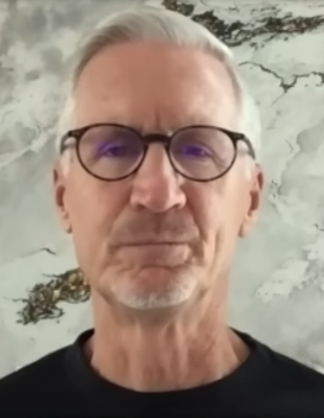
- Breen in 2023
- Born: Michael Breen; May 22, 1961 (age 65); Yonkers, New York, U.S.
- Education: Fordham University
- Years active: 1991–present
- Notable credits: Curt Gowdy Media Award, 2021; Broadcaster of the Year, 1998 National Sportscasters and Sportswriters Association; Three-time Sports Emmy Award winner (Outstanding Play-by-Play)
- Title: Sportscaster
- Spouse: Rosanne Breen
- Children: 3
- Sports commentary career
- Genre: Play-by-play
- Sports: Basketball; American football

Michael Breen (born May 22, 1961) is an American play-by-play sports commentator. He has been the lead announcer for NBA games on ABC and ESPN since 2006, including the NBA Finals. He is also the lead announcer for New York Knicks games on the MSG Network. Breen previously called NFL regular season games for both NFL on Fox and NFL on NBC, as well as New York Giants preseason games.

== Biography ==
=== Early life ===
Breen was raised in Yonkers, New York, and attended St. Paul the Apostle Catholic grammar school. He is a 1979 graduate of Salesian High School, and a 1983 graduate of Fordham University. Breen grew up as a fan of the Knicks and the New York Mets. Breen's favorite athletes as a child were future broadcasting partner Walt Frazier, Dave DeBusschere, and Bud Harrelson.

=== Basketball ===
Breen started doing play-by-play for the Marist College Red Foxes basketball team in 1985. From 1991 to 1997 he worked with the Knicks as a radio announcer for WFAN. For the 1997–98 season, Breen was promoted to television play-by-play for the Knicks, as Marv Albert was fired from MSG Network following his infamous sex scandal. Upon Albert's return in 1999, he became his backup on MSG Network and continued as the lead announcer on WFAN. In 2004, he became the lead Knicks play-by-play following Albert's second dismissal from the network.

For the 1998 NBA playoffs, Breen joined NBC as a backup play-by-play announcer, and he remained in that role until the end of the network's coverage of the league in 2002. He also did play-by-play for WNBA games during his tenure at NBC, most notably Game 2 of the 1999 WNBA Finals when New York Liberty guard Teresa Weatherspoon made a half-court shot at the final buzzer to beat the Houston Comets. He joined ESPN as the number 3 announcer for the 2003–04 NBA season. In February 2006, with the departure of Al Michaels from the network, ABC announced that Breen would take over as the lead broadcaster for the NBA, including the NBA Finals. In the 2006–07 season, he was part of the lead broadcast team with Jeff Van Gundy and Mark Jackson as analysts, and the trio called games until Van Gundy and Jackson's dismissal from the network amid ESPN's layoffs in 2023.

Breen is known for yelling the word "BANG!" (or other phrases such as "It's good!" or "Puts it in!") after key shots are made, usually very late in the game, and at times, more than once. Some of his calls include:

June 18, 2013 – As ABC's lead play-by-play commentator, Breen called Game 6 of the NBA Finals between the San Antonio Spurs and the Miami Heat. In the final seconds of regulation, Ray Allen hit a clutch three-pointer for the Heat to send the game to overtime. They would eventually go on to win in overtime and Game 7. This is widely considered to be one of the greatest shots in NBA history, considering the fact that if Allen had missed, the Spurs would have won the championship.

"James catches, puts up a three. Won't go, rebound Bosh, back out to Allen, his three-pointer, BANG! TIE GAME WITH FIVE SECONDS REMAINING!"

June 19, 2016 – Breen called Game 7 of the 2016 NBA Finals between the Cleveland Cavaliers and the Golden State Warriors. With the game tied with less than two minutes remaining, Cavaliers' LeBron James blocked Warriors' Andre Iguodala's fastbreak layup. The Cavaliers went on to win the game and the championship by the final score of 93–89, ending Cleveland's 52-year major league championship drought. Since the Cavaliers also came back from a 3-1 deficit in this series, James's crucial block is known as one of the greatest defensive plays in NBA history.

"Iguodala to Curry, back to Iguodala, up for the layup! OH, BLOCKED BY JAMES! LeBron James with the rejection!"

When the Knicks made the 2011 NBA Playoffs, Breen did not call any of the games for MSG due to his involvement with ESPN and ABC; he did call Games 3 (with the MSG broadcasts handled by Kenny Albert) and 4 for ESPN and ABC, respectively.

Some of Breen's current and past broadcast partners were employed with the Knicks at one point. The list includes former Knicks head coaches Hubie Brown and Jeff Van Gundy, former Knicks players Mark Jackson and Walt Frazier, and former Knicks radio color announcer John Andariese. While working alongside Bill Walton on ESPN, Breen was on hand for the infamous Pacers–Pistons brawl on November 19, 2004. Two seasons later, Breen was on hand for the Knicks–Nuggets brawl with MSG Network on December 16, 2006. The former was detailed in ESPN's First Take talk show on The Old Man and The Three podcast w/ JJ Redick.

In addition, he was also the voice of the NBA Live, beginning with NBA Elite 11, alongside his usual ESPN partners Mark Jackson and Jeff Van Gundy. However, the series was canceled indefinitely. He did voice along with Van Gundy in the NBA Live series beginning with NBA Live 14 through NBA Live 18. Following NBA Live 18, Breen and Van Gundy were replaced by Ed Cohen and Jay Williams.

On May 14, 2021, Breen received the Curt Gowdy Media Award by the Naismith Memorial Basketball Hall of Fame. During his acceptance speech, Breen stated: “I’ve had this enormous privilege to call so many great moments in NBA history, but the best part, the best part, has always been the lifetime of friendships that the game has given me.”

In Game 7 of the 2022 Eastern Conference Finals, as well as the first two games of the 2022 NBA Finals, Breen sat out of the broadcasting team due to a positive COVID-19 test, and was replaced by Mark Jones. Breen returned in Game 3 of the NBA Finals.

In 2023, following a wave of layoffs which included his partners Jeff Van Gundy and Mark Jackson, Breen was the only remaining commentator in the lead broadcast team, with Doris Burke and former NBA coach Doc Rivers joining the lead team. The lineup underwent further changes over the next two seasons. Rivers departed in early 2024 after accepting the head coaching position with the Milwaukee Bucks, and his replacement, former NBA player JJ Redick, left ESPN after the 2024 NBA Finals to become head coach of the Los Angeles Lakers.

For the 2025–26 NBA season, ESPN introduced a new primary broadcast team featuring Breen alongside analysts Tim Legler and Richard Jefferson, with Lisa Salters serving as the lead sideline reporter. This group is assigned to call the network’s marquee NBA broadcasts, including the NBA Finals on ABC. Burke subsequently moved to ESPN’s secondary NBA broadcast team, where she works with play-by-play announcer Dave Pasch.

=== Olympics ===
Breen has announced in five Olympic Games during his career, one Winter Olympics and four Summer Olympics. At the 1996 Summer Olympics in Atlanta, the 2000 Summer Olympics in Sydney, and the 2004 Summer Olympics in Athens, Breen called basketball, handling play-by-play for both the men and the women. At the 2002 Winter Olympics in Salt Lake City, Breen called ski jumping. Breen served as a play-by-play announcer for NBC Sports coverage of men's and women's Basketball at the 2008 Summer Olympics.

=== Radio ===
Breen has been a fixture on the radio as well. He began his professional radio career as a sportscaster on WNBC radio in the early 1980s, and frequently substituted for Dave Sims as host of "SportsNight" on the station. From 1988 to 2000, Breen did the sports segment on the WFAN and nationally syndicated Imus in the Morning talk/comedy radio show. Breen became noted for his deadpan delivery of false sports news, such as in the mid-1990s reporting that in the previous night's Mets game, "Félix Millán went 4-for-4 with 3 runs scored" (Millán retired in 1977).

=== Personal life ===
Breen resides on Long Island, New York, with his wife Rosanne and their three children. He is Catholic.

== Career timeline ==
Year	Title	Role	Network
1989–1990; 2002–2003	NBA on TNT	Play-by-play	TNT
1991–present	MSG Network	Play-by-play	MSG Network
1994–1996	NFL on Fox	Play-by-play	Fox
1997	NFL on NBC	Play-by-play	NBC
1997–2002	NBA on NBC	Play-by-play	NBC
1999–2001	WNBA on NBC	Play-by-play	NBC
2006–present	NBA on ABC/ESPN	Play-by-play	ABC; ESPN

Preceded by Al Michaels	Play-by-play announcer, NBA Finals; 2006–present	Incumbent
Preceded by Al Michaels	Lead play-by-play announcer, NBA on ABC; 2006–present	Incumbent
