= 2016 Holy Cross Crusaders football team =

American college football season

2016 Holy Cross Crusaders football
- Conference: Patriot League
- Record: 4–7 (2–4 Patriot)
- Head coach: Tom Gilmore (13th season)
- Offensive coordinator: Brian Rock (2nd season)
- Defensive coordinator: Mike Kashurba (3rd season)
- Home stadium: Fitton Field

2016 Patriot League football standings
	Conf.			Overall
Team	W		L	W		L
No. 21 Lehigh $^	6	–	0	9	–	3
Fordham	5	–	1	8	–	3
Colgate	4	–	2	5	–	5
Bucknell	3	–	3	4	–	7
Holy Cross	2	–	4	4	–	7
Lafayette	1	–	5	2	–	9
Georgetown	0	–	6	3	–	8
$ – Conference champion; ^ – FCS playoff participant; Rankings from STATS Poll

The 2016 Holy Cross Crusaders football team represented the College of the Holy Cross as a member of the Patriot League during the 2016 NCAA Division I FCS football season. Led by 13th-year head coach Tom Gilmore, Holy Cross compiled an overall record of 4–7 with a mark of 2–4 in conference play, placing fifth in the Patriot League. The Crusaders played their home games at Fitton Field. They finished the season 4–7, 2–4 in Worcester, Massachusetts.

== Schedule ==
Date	Time	Opponent	Site	TV	Result	Attendance
September 3	2:00 pm	at Morgan State*	Hughes Stadium; Baltimore, MD		W 51–24	4,203
September 10	7:00 pm	at No. 24 New Hampshire*	Wildcat Stadium; Durham, NH	ASN	L 28–39	13,242
September 17	7:00 pm	at No. 25 Albany*	Bob Ford Field at Tom & Mary Casey Stadium; Albany, NY	DZ	L 28–45	8,040
September 24	1:00 pm	Dartmouth*^{†}	Fitton Field; Worcester, MA	Charter TV3	L 10–35	9,878
October 1	3:30 pm	at Lafayette	Fisher Stadium; Easton, PA	WBPH-TV	W 38–28	4,948
October 8	1:00 pm	Bucknell	Fitton Field; Worcester, MA	Charter TV3	L 20–21	6,184
October 15	1:00 pm	No. 20 Harvard*	Fitton Field; Worcester, MA	Charter TV3	W 27–17	9,115
October 22	12:00 pm	Lehigh	Fitton Field; Worcester, MA	ASN	L 14–46	3,668
October 29	1:00 pm	at Colgate	Crown Field at Andy Kerr Stadium; Hamilton, NY	PLN	L 8–26	7,226
November 5	1:00 pm	at Georgetown	Cooper Field; Washington, D.C.	PLN	W 21–20	1,710
November 12	3:00 pm	vs. Fordham	Yankee Stadium; Bronx, NY (Ram–Crusader Cup)	PLN	L 14–54	21,375
*Non-conference game; ^{†}Homecoming; Rankings from STATS Poll released prior to the game; All times are in Eastern time

== Game summaries ==
=== At Morgan State ===
	1	2	3	4	Total
Crusaders	7	23	14	7	51
Bears	10	7	0	7	24

=== At New Hampshire ===
	1	2	3	4	Total
Crusaders	14	7	7	0	28
#24 Wildcats	6	7	19	7	39

=== At Albany ===
	1	2	3	4	Total
Crusaders	7	0	7	14	28
#25 Great Danes	0	28	3	14	45

=== Dartmouth ===
	1	2	3	4	Total
Big Green	14	7	7	7	35
Crusaders	7	0	3	0	10

=== At Lafayette ===
	1	2	3	4	Total
Crusaders	10	3	3	22	38
Leopards	0	7	14	7	28

=== Bucknell ===
	1	2	3	4	Total
Bison	0	7	7	7	21
Crusaders	7	13	0	0	20

=== Harvard ===
	1	2	3	4	Total
#20 Crimson	7	10	0	0	17
Crusaders	21	0	3	3	27

=== Lehigh ===
	1	2	3	4	Total
Mountain Hawks	7	11	21	7	46
Crusaders	7	0	0	7	14

=== At Colgate ===
	1	2	3	4	Total
Crusaders	0	0	0	8	8
Raiders	7	3	0	16	26

=== At Georgetown ===
	1	2	3	4	Total
Crusaders	14	7	0	0	21
Hoyas	7	10	3	0	20

=== Vs. Fordham ===
	1	2	3	4	Total
Rams	21	19	7	7	54
Crusaders	0	7	7	0	14
