= Andrew Breiner =

American football coach (born 1984)

Brown University
- Title: Wide receivers coach

Personal information
- Born: July 9, 1984 (age 42); Dallas, Texas, U.S.

Career information
- High school: Hershey (PA)
- College: Lock Haven

Career history
- Lock Haven (2006) Wide receivers coach; Allegheny (2007) Wide receivers coach; Allegheny (2008) Quarterbacks coach; Connecticut (2009–2011) Graduate assistant; Fordham (2012–2015) Offensive coordinator & quarterbacks coach; Fordham (2016–2017) Head coach; Mississippi State (2018–2019) Passing game coordinator & quarterbacks coach; Philadelphia Eagles (2020) Pass game analyst; FIU (2021) Offensive coordinator & wide receivers coach; Jacksonville Jaguars (2022–2024) Assistant quarterbacks coach; Brown (2025–present) Wide receivers coach

Head coaching record
- Career: NCAA: 12–10 (.545)

Andrew Breiner (born July 9, 1984) is an American football coach who is the Wide receivers coach for the Brown University. He previously served as the assistant quarterbacks coach for the Jacksonville Jaguars of the National Football League (NFL) from 2022 to 2024, was an offensive coordinator and quarterbacks coach at Florida International University (FIU) in 2021, and a pass game analyst for the Philadelphia Eagles in 2020.

Breiner previously served as the head coach at Fordham University and also served as an assistant coach at the Mississippi State University, University of Connecticut, Allegheny College and Lock Haven University of Pennsylvania.

== Early life ==
Breiner was born on July 9, 1984, in Dallas, Texas, and grew up in Hummelstown, Pennsylvania. Breiner played college football at the Lock Haven University of Pennsylvania and he was a four-year letter winner with the Bald Eagles as a wide receiver and also played special teams. Breiner won a National Football Foundation Scholar-Athlete Award from the Central Pennsylvania Chapter of the NFF for his accomplishments athletically, academically and in the community. In 2006, Breiner earned a degree in health and physical education from Lock Haven University.

== Coaching career ==
=== Lock Haven ===
In 2006, Breiner began his coaching career as the wide receivers at the Lock Haven University of Pennsylvania, his alma mater.

=== Allegheny ===
In 2007, Breiner joined Allegheny College as their wide receivers coach. In 2008, Breiner transitioned to quarterbacks coach.

=== Connecticut ===
In 2009, Breiner was hired as a graduate assistant, quarterbacks and wide receivers coach at the University of Connecticut. In 2011, Breiner was named a graduate assistant, quarterbacks and running backs coach.

=== Fordham ===
In 2012, Breiner joined Fordham University as their offensive coordinator and quarterbacks coach under head coach Joe Moorhead.

In 2016, Breiner was named the head coach at Fordham University, succeeding Moorhead.

On December 5, 2017, Breiner resigned as head coach of the Rams.

=== Mississippi State ===
Following his resignation as head coach at Fordham University, Breiner was named the passing game coordinator and quarterbacks coach at Mississippi State University, reuniting with head coach Joe Moorhead.

=== Philadelphia Eagles ===
On February 5, 2020, Breiner was hired by the Philadelphia Eagles as a pass game analyst under head coach Doug Pederson.

=== FIU ===
In 2021, Breiner was hired as the offensive coordinator and quarterbacks coach at Florida International University (FIU).

=== Jacksonville Jaguars ===
On February 17, 2022, Breiner was hired by the Jacksonville Jaguars as their assistant quarterbacks coach under head coach Doug Pederson.

=== Brown ===
In 2025, Breiner was hired as the wide receivers coach at Brown University.

== Head coaching record ==
Year	Team	Overall	Conference	Standing	Bowl/playoffs
Fordham Rams (Patriot League) (2016–2017)
2016	Fordham	8–3	5–1	2nd	
2017	Fordham	4–7	3–3	T–3rd	
Fordham:		12–10	8–4		
Total:		12–10			

== Personal life ==
Breiner is married to his wife, Kelly. They have a daughter and son together.
