= Matt Martucci =

American sports announcer

Matt Martucci is an American sports announcer who is the voice of the St. Joseph's Hawks men's basketball.

== Biography ==
Martucci took over for Tom McCarthy in 2009 and has been partnered with ESPN's Joe Lunardi for what is now seventeen seasons. In addition to basketball, he has called various other sports including football, tennis, lacrosse, volleyball, baseball, and even arena football. He is a sports update anchor for Sirius XM Radio, is the former radio voice of the Philadelphia Soul, and is a play-by-play baseball broadcaster for ONE World Sports. Martucci also does college basketball and soccer for Fox Sports Regional TV. He called minor league baseball games for the Atlantic City Surf and also handled media relations for the team. From 2006-2008 Martucci called men's and women's basketball games for the Lincoln Lions. He is a 2006 graduate of Syracuse University, where he was part of the sports staff at WAER radio---calling football, men's basketball, and lacrosse for the famed college station.

== Personal life ==
A Syracuse University graduate, Matt is originally from Brodheadsville, Pennsylvania.
