= Alan Hahn =

American sports announcer

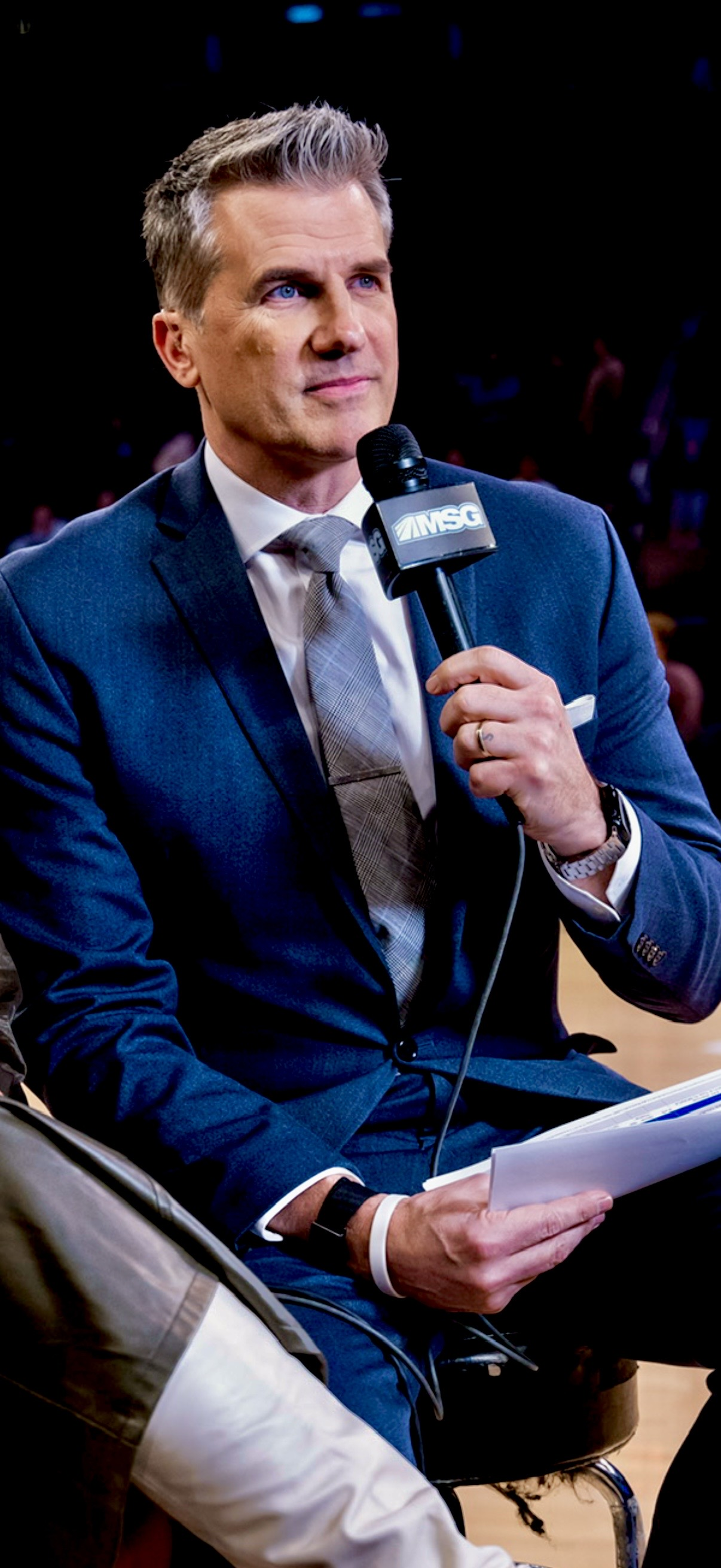
Alan Hahn

Alan William Hahn (born June 19, 1971) is an NBA analyst for ESPN and MSG Network and a sports talk radio host for ESPN New York.

== Early life and education ==
Hahn was born and raised on Long Island and grew up in Lake Ronkonkoma, N.Y. He played basketball at St. Anthony's High School in South Huntington, N.Y. and also at Suffolk Community College, where he is one of four men's basketball players in school history to score over 1,000 career points.

He then earned a basketball scholarship at LIU Post under legendary NCAA Division II coach Tom Galeazzi. He suffered a knee injury in his first season and it led to an early end to his playing career. At LIU Post, Hahn wrote for the school newspaper The Pioneer. Hahn earned a Bachelor of Science degree in journalism at LIU Post.

In 2026, Hahn was inducted into the Long Island University Athletics Hall of Fame.

== Sportswriting career ==
Hahn started his journalism career at Newsday in 1995 and by 1999 was assigned to the New York Islanders beat. He earned the paper's prestigious Publisher's Award in 2000 for Sports Writing. He covered the Islanders until 2006, when he was moved to the New York Knicks beat. He developed a following for his coverage of the Knicks, and his popular blog The Knicks Fix along with his overall coverage of the NBA.

== Broadcasting career ==
Hahn was hired by MSG Network in 2011 to serve as studio analyst for Knicks broadcasts. Over time his role expanded to hosting and serving as sideline reporter. He also has filled in on Knicks game broadcasts as a color analyst and was part of MSG's coverage of the team's historic NBA championship run in 2026.

In 2014, Hahn was hired by ESPN as a radio host. He has teamed up on shows with former New York Islanders goalie Rick DiPietro, former NFL linebacker Bart Scott before he was promoted to co-host afternoon drive on ESPN New York with Don LaGreca and Peter Rosenberg. Their show, Don, Hahn & Rosenberg, is also simulcast on MSG Network.

Hahn has also worked NBA broadcasts nationally for ESPN Radio, as host of the NBA Draft since 2022 and as a color analyst for NBA on ESPN Radio.

He also makes regular appearances on ESPN's national shows such as SportsCenter, NBA Today, Get Up and First Take.

== Other sports media ==
Hahn has written five sports books over his career, including 100 Things Knicks Fans Must Know and Do Before They Die (Triumph, 2012), The New York Knicks: An Illustrated History (MVP Books, 2012), Bruin Redemption: The Stanley Cup Returns to Boston (F&W Media, 2011), Birth of a Dynasty: The 1980 New York Islanders (Sports Publishing LLC, 2004) and Fish Sticks: The Fall and Rise of the New York Islanders (Sports Publishing LLC, 2003), which he co-wrote with Peter Botte of the New York Daily News.

Hahn appeared in the documentary Big Shot, which was directed and narrated by Kevin Connolly and was part of the ESPN Films 30-for-30 series in 2013.

== Awards ==
In 2000, after his first year as a full-time staff writer, Hahn received Newsday's Publisher's Award for Sports Writing.

In 2013, Hahn received his first Emmy Award for his role in Friday Night Knicks on MSG Networks, which won the Live Sports Event: Series category for the 2011-12 season. He has since been part of four Emmy Award-winning broadcasts with MSG.

In 2017, the Hahn, Humpty & Canty Show won Outstanding On-Air Broadcasting Team award by the New York State Broadcasters Association. .

In 2026, Hahn was inducted into the Suffolk County Sports Hall of Fame.
