= Alessandro Martucci =

Italian painter

Alessandro Martucci (16th century) was an Italian painter of the Renaissance period, active near his natal city of Capua. His son, Simio, painted quadratura and died in 1641.
