= Cal Ramsey =

American basketball player (1937–2019)

Personal information
- Born: July 13, 1937 Selma, Alabama, U.S.
- Died: March 25, 2019 (aged 81) Manhattan, New York, U.S.
- Listed height: 6 ft 4 in (1.93 m)
- Listed weight: 200 lb (91 kg)

Career information
- High school: Commerce (New York City, New York)
- College: NYU (1956–1959)
- NBA draft: 1959: 7th round, 13th overall pick
- Drafted by: St. Louis Hawks
- Playing career: 1959–1964
- Position: Small forward
- Number: 13, 15, 3

Career history
- 1959: St. Louis Hawks
- 1959: New York Knicks
- 1959–1964: Williamsport Billies
- 1960: Syracuse Nationals

Career highlights
- All-EPBL Second Team (1962)
- Stats at NBA.com
- Stats at Basketball Reference

Calvin Ramsey (July 13, 1937 – March 25, 2019) was an American professional basketball player and broadcaster. A standout college player for the NYU Violets, he played in 13 games over two seasons in the National Basketball Association (NBA). After his playing career ended, he began a 28-year affiliation with the New York Knicks as a broadcaster and a community representative. He was named in ESPN's "Elite 24: Rucker Park legends".

== Biography ==
=== Early life and career ===
Ramsey was born in Selma, Alabama on July 13, 1937, but spent most of his life in New York City. In his youth, he played in the Rucker Park League, winning the MVP and was known for his wars with Connie Hawkins. After graduating from High School of Commerce, he joined the NYU Violets as a forward in 1956. At NYU, he played with future hall of famer Thomas “Satch” Sanders. Over three years, he averaged 20.2 points per game and 17.5 rebounds. in his senior year, 1958, Ramsey was named as an All-American. When he died, he still held the school record for rebounds in a game, with 34 against Boston College. As of 2018, he was 11th on NYU's all-time scoring list.

After graduating from NYU with a degree in business, Ramsey entered the 1959 NBA draft where the St. Louis Hawks selected him with the 13th overall pick. At a height of 6’4”, Ramsey was short to play the forward position during that era, but was not a strong enough ball handler to play guard. This limited his career, and he only played 11 games in his rookie season with the Hawks (he also played for the New York Knicks). The following season, he played in two games with the Syracuse Nationals. After his NBA career, Ramsey played for the Williamsport Billies in the Eastern Professional Basketball League (EPBL) from 1959 to 1964. He was selected to the All-EPBL Second Team in 1962.

After his playing days ended, Ramsey charged that a quota system in basketball limited the number of black players in the league at that time. Fellow broadcaster Marv Albert agreed, saying “If you didn’t start as a black player, you wouldn’t be with the team.” Out of basketball, Ramsey became a teacher for several years.

=== Broadcaster and coach ===
In 1972, he joined the Knicks broadcasting team, a position he held until 1982. He called the Knicks win over the Los Angeles Lakers in the 1973 NBA Finals and, over his tenure, worked with Dick Stockton for one season, and Marv Albert, who joined the television crew in 1979. In 1982, the Knicks retired Ramsey from the broadcast booth and replaced him with former NBA player Butch Beard.

After leaving the Knicks, he joined the coaching staff of NYU in 1983, which restored its basketball program after a 12-year hiatus. His former teammate at NYU, Mike Muzio, was appointed as the head coach. He continued in that role for the remainder of his life.

=== Later life ===
In 1991, the Knicks hired him as a community ambassador where he worked with schools and youth programs. He continued attending Knicks games until his health began to fail in 2018.

On March 25, 2019, Ramsey died from cardiac arrest at a rehabilitation facility. Ramsey had suffered from diabetes for a number of years.

Ramsey was inducted into the NYU Athletics Hall of Fame in 1978 and the New York City Basketball Hall of Fame in 1994.

== Career statistics ==
Legend
GP	Games played	GS	Games started	MPG	Minutes per game
FG%	Field goal percentage	3P%	3-point field goal percentage	FT%	Free throw percentage
RPG	Rebounds per game	APG	Assists per game	SPG	Steals per game
BPG	Blocks per game	PPG	Points per game	**Bold**	Career high

=== NBA ===
==== Regular season ====
Year	Team	GP	MPG	FG%	FT%	RPG	APG	PPG
1959–60	St. Louis	4	8.8	.368	**.750**	4.8	.0	4.3
1959–60	New York	**7**	**22.9**	**.416**	.552	**6.7**	1.3	**11.4**
1960–61	Syracuse	2	13.5	.182	.500	3.5	**1.5**	3.0
Career		13	17.1	.383	.568	5.6	.9	7.9

== See also ==
- List of NCAA Division I men's basketball players with 30 or more rebounds in a game
