= Ed Cohen =

American sportscaster (born 1983)

- Born: June 25, 1983 (age 43); Scarsdale, New York, U.S.
- Education: Ithaca College
- Occupation: Sportscaster

Ed Cohen (born June 25, 1983) is a sportscaster known for his work with ESPN Plus, MLB.com, NHL Network, Rutgers University, MSG Network, and ONE World Sports. He recently served as the radio play-by-play voice of the New York Knicks.

== Early life ==
Cohen grew up in Scarsdale, New York, where at the age of 10 years old he knew he wanted to be a sportscaster. He called his first games as a sophomore at Scarsdale High School on the town's public access channel.

Cohen graduated from Ithaca College in 2005 with a degree in journalism from the Roy H. Park School of Communications.

== Career ==
Cohen's first on-air job was as the play-by-play voice of Manhattan College's men's basketball team in 2005, a role he served for six seasons. In addition, he was the radio play-by-play announcer for the Rutgers women's basketball team from 2008 to 2014.

Cohen's other early work includes voicing highlights, studio hosting and calling games for NBA TV, MLB.com and NHL Network. Beginning in 2007, he spent three summers calling minor league baseball games for the Burlington Royals and for the Billings Mustangs.

Starting in 2009, Cohen served as one of the play-by-play voices for MSG Varsity, a network dedicated exclusively to high school sports.

From 2010 to 2015, he was a sports update anchor for SiriusXM, which included delivering reports on SiriusXM NFL Radio's Sunday Drive program.

Cohen called a wide range of sports as play-by-play voice of ONE World Sports. His assignments included the Kontinental Hockey League, Champions Hockey League, Chinese Basketball Association, New York Cosmos soccer and baseball's legendary Yomiuri Giants. In June 2015, he reported live during the Cosmos historic friendly in Havana, Cuba.

Cohen made his Olympics debut with NBC Sports in 2016, calling weightlifting in the Rio Games alongside Shane Hamman. Later that year, he did play-by-play of the Paralympic Games for wheelchair rugby, including the gold medal game on NBC. Cohen reprised his role as weightlifting play-by-play announcer the 2020 and 2024 Summer Olympics.

He has worked the U.S. Tennis Open since 2015, calling play-by-play for the tournament's international television feed as well as US Open Radio. He handled similar world feed responsibilities for IMG Media's coverage of the New York City Marathon in 2017.

Cohen continues to call college basketball games for CBS Sports Network, which he has done since 2013, along with Big Ten Network, in addition to past experience with ESPN Regional and covering the Atlantic 10 on SNY and American Sports Network.

== New York Knicks ==
Cohen works with analysts Monica McNutt and Wally Szczerbiak on Knicks radio broadcasts, heard on ESPN New York 98.7 FM. In January 2018, he worked his first Knicks' MSG telecast alongside Walt Frazier.

Cohen is also the TV play-by-play voice of the New York Liberty on MSG Networks. He previously called New York Cosmos soccer on MSG in addition to handling play-by-play responsibilities for MSG Network's coverage of Knicks Summer League in 2017.

== Personal life ==
Cohen was named one of the "Top 30 Sportscasters Under 30" by STAA in 2014.

Cohen lives in Westchester County, New York, with his wife Emily and two kids.
