= One World Sports =

Former American television channel

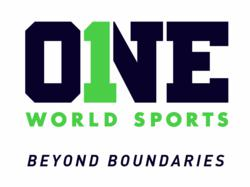
- Country: United States
- Broadcast area: National
- Headquarters: Stamford, Connecticut

Programming
- Language: English

Ownership
- Owner: One Media Corporation

History
- Launched: August 25, 2011
- Closed: March 16, 2017
- Replaced by: Eleven Sports Network

One World Sports (stylized ONE World Sports) was an American sports-oriented cable and satellite television channel. Owned by One Media Corporation, which was led by Seamus O'Brien, the network was primarily devoted to international sports, including soccer, the England cricket team, KHL, the Champions Hockey League, and others. It was the main broadcaster of the New York Cosmos of the North American Soccer League, whose chairman was head of the network.

In March 2017, One World Sports was quietly shut down amid financial difficulties, and "certain distribution assets" of the network were sold to international broadcaster Eleven Sports, who replaced it in its channel allotments with the Eleven Sports Network.

== History ==
One World Sports was established in 2011 by One Media Corporation, a company led by Seamus O'Brien, chairman of the New York Cosmos of the NASL. The network acquired many of the sports rights formerly accumulated by the America One network.

In November 2016, the channel's staff was furloughed as a cost-cutting measure after it failed to receive a round of funding. It was also reported that the channel was exploring a possible sale. In March 2017, the channel was quietly replaced on television providers by a new channel branded as Eleven Sports Network. There were also allegations that the network was behind on paying the freelancers and other employees who worked for the channel.

On March 16, 2017, Eleven Sports, co-owned by Italian entrepreneur Andrea Radrizzani (stakeholder of Leeds United F.C., and executive of the sports marketing agency MP & Silva) and The Channel Company, officially announced that it had acquired "certain distribution assets" of One World Sports. The brand already operated networks in Belgium, Luxembourg, Poland, Singapore, and Taiwan. Financial details of the sale were not disclosed. The same day, the Cosmos announced a new regional television deal with MSG Network and CW flagship station WPIX.

In response to the unpaid One World Sports staff, Eleven's group marketing director Danny Menken emphasized they had only acquired the network's distribution assets and stated that "people that have issues with [OWS] have to contact management, but we have no shares or relationship beyond the acquisition of distribution assets." One World Sports has become the subject of multiple lawsuits over unpaid freelancers and subcontractors.

== Programming ==
=== Former programming ===
Soccer

- AFC Asian Cup
- AFC Champions League
- AFC U-23 Championship
- Arsenal TV
- FC Bayern Munich TV
- Miami FC national US broadcast rights, shared with WSFL who has regional rights

Ice hockey

- Kontinental Hockey League
- Champions Hockey League

Basketball

- Chinese Basketball Association
- Liga ACB

Baseball

- Home games of the Yomiuri Giants (Stopped covering before the start of the 2016 season)

Arena football

- China Arena Football League

Cricket

- England cricket team home matches, and surrounding editorial content from Sky Sports
- 2015 Ashes series
- Hero Caribbean Premier League T20 (live and replay matches; replays shared with Willow)

Golf

- OneAsia Golf Tour

Table tennis

- ITTF Table Tennis Pro Series

Badminton

- BWF Badminton Super Series

Darts

- Grand Slam of Darts

Mixed martial arts

- Abu Dhabi Warriors Fighting Championship

Highlight shows and weekly series

- OneAsia Tour Golf Highlights
- England National Cricket Team Highlights
- Badminton World
- Football Asia
- The Football Review
- NASL Highlights

Soccer

- J1 League
- K League Classic
- Chinese Super League
- A-League
- Chelsea TV
- New York Cosmos

Rugby

- Top League
- PRO Rugby

Field hockey

- Hockey India League

Aquatics

- Aquatic Super Series

== On air talent ==
- Steve Cangialosi – Hockey, Soccer
- Ed Cohen – Baseball, Basketball, Hockey, Soccer
- Mike Crispino – Baseball, Basketball, Hockey, Soccer
- JP Dellacamera – NY Cosmos and Asian Cup Soccer
- Hunter Freeman – NY Cosmos and Asian Cup Soccer
- Keith Irizarry – Baseball, Basketball, Hockey
- Tom Laidlaw – Hockey Analyst
- Dave Leno – Baseball, Hockey
- Matt Martucci – Baseball
- Shep Messing – NY Cosmos and Asian Cup Soccer
- Jon Meterperel – Baseball, Basketball, Hockey
- Janusz Michallik – NY Cosmos Soccer
- Vin Parise – Basketball Analyst
- Mike Petke – NY Cosmos Soccer
- Bill Spaulding – Baseball, Basketball, Hockey

== See also ==
- America One
