= 2016 Big Sky Conference football season =

- League: NCAA Division I Football Championship
- Sport: Football
- Duration: September 1, 2016 through January 2017
- Teams: 13

2017 NFL Draft

Regular season

Football seasons
- 2015 2017

2016 Big Sky Conference football standings
	Conf.			Overall
Team	W		L	W		L
No. 4 Eastern Washington +^	8	–	0	12	–	2
No. 12 North Dakota +^	8	–	0	9	–	3
No. 25 Weber State ^	6	–	2	7	–	5
No. 24 Cal Poly ^	5	–	3	7	–	5
Southern Utah	5	–	3	6	–	5
Northern Colorado	4	–	4	6	–	5
Northern Arizona	4	–	4	5	–	6
Montana	3	–	5	6	–	5
Montana State	2	–	6	4	–	7
Portland State	2	–	6	3	–	8
UC Davis	2	–	6	3	–	8
Sacramento State	2	–	6	2	–	9
Idaho State	1	–	7	2	–	9
$ – Conference champion; ^ – FCS playoff participant; Rankings from STATS Poll

The 2016 Big Sky Conference football season is the 53rd season of college football play for the Big Sky Conference and is a part of the 2016 NCAA Division I FCS football season.

Eastern Washington and North Dakota shared the Big Sky title.

== Rankings ==
Legend
Increase in ranking
Decrease in ranking
Not ranked previous week

		Pre	Wk 1	Wk 2	Wk 3	Wk 4	Wk 5	Wk 6	Wk 7	Wk 8	Wk 9	Wk 10	Wk 11	Wk 12	Final
Cal Poly	S					16	21	19	T-17	14	14	16	21	21	24
Cal Poly	C					18	22	20	T-18	17	16	20	23	20	T-21
Eastern Washington	S	14	8	8	4	4	4	4	3	3	3	3	3	3	4
Eastern Washington	C	17	8	7	5	5	5	5	3	3	3	3	3	4	4
Idaho State	S														
Idaho State	C														
Montana	S	13	14	7	6	11	10	10	10	16	19	18	22		
Montana	C	13	15	9	6	11	10	10	10	16	20	17	21	22	25
Montana State	S														
Montana State	C														
North Dakota	S	19	25				24	22	19	17	16	12	10	8	12
North Dakota	C	21					21	18	16	12	11	10	8	8	12
Northern Arizona	S	18	19	24											
Northern Arizona	C	18	17	24	T-25										
Northern Colorado	S														
Northern Colorado	C														
Portland State	S	17	16	19	25										
Portland State	C	12	14	17	T-25										
Sacramento State	S														
Sacramento State	C														
Southern Utah	S														
Southern Utah	C	23	23	21	RV										
UC Davis	S														
UC Davis	C														
Weber State	S													25	25
Weber State	C													23	24

Legend
	Improvement in ranking
	Drop in ranking
	Not ranked previous week
	No change in ranking from previous week
RV	Received votes but were not ranked in Top 25 of poll

== Attendance ==
Team	Stadium	Capacity	Game 1	Game 2	Game 3	Game 4	Game 5	Game 6	Game 7	Game 8	Total	Average	% of Capacity
Cal Poly	Alex G. Spanos Stadium	11,075											
Eastern Washington	Roos Field	8,600											
Idaho State	Holt Arena	12,000											
Montana	Washington–Grizzly Stadium	25,217											
Montana State	Bobcat Stadium	20,767											
North Dakota	Alerus Center	12,283											
Northern Arizona	Walkup Skydome	11,230											
Northern Colorado	Nottingham Field	8,533											
Portland State	Providence Park	22,000											
Sacramento State	Hornet Stadium	21,195											
Southern Utah	Eccles Coliseum	8,500											
UC Davis	Aggie Stadium	10,743											
Weber State	Stewart Stadium	17,312											
Total	–	–	–	–	–	–	–	–	–	–	–	–	–

== 2017 NFL draft ==
†	= Pro Bowler

Rnd.	Pick	Team	Player	Pos.	College	Notes
3	69	Los Angeles Rams	Cooper Kupp ^{†}	WR	Eastern Washington	
4	125	Los Angeles Rams	Samson Ebukam	LB	Eastern Washington	from Tampa Bay via NY Jets

Original NFL team	Player	Pos.	College	Notes
Oakland Raiders	Cameron Johnston	P	UC Davis	
San Francisco 49ers	Kendrick Bourne	WR	Eastern Washington	

== Head coaches ==
- Beau Baldwin, Eastern Washington
- Bruce Barnum, Portland State
- Jeff Choate, Montana State
- Earnest Collins, Northern Colorado
- Ron Gould, UC Davis
- Jay Hill, Weber State
- Mike Kramer, Idaho State
- Bubba Schweigert, North Dakota
- Jody Sears, Sacramento State
- Jerome Souers, Northern Arizona
- Bob Stitt, Montana
- Tim Walsh, Cal Poly
- Demario Warren, Southern Utah
