= 2016 Northern Colorado Bears football team =

American college football season

2016 Northern Colorado Bears football
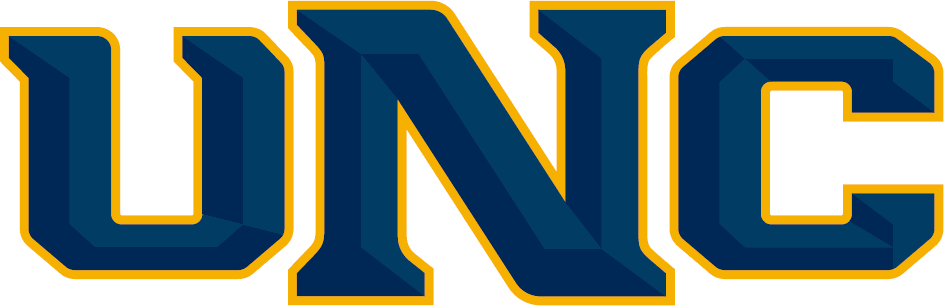
- Conference: Big Sky Conference
- Record: 6–5 (4–4 Big Sky)
- Head coach: Earnest Collins Jr. (6th season)
- Offensive coordinator: James Jones (1st season)
- Offensive scheme: Spread
- Defensive coordinator: Larry Kerr (3rd season)
- Base defense: 4–3
- Home stadium: Nottingham Field

2016 Big Sky Conference football standings
	Conf.			Overall
Team	W		L	W		L
No. 4 Eastern Washington +^	8	–	0	12	–	2
No. 12 North Dakota +^	8	–	0	9	–	3
No. 25 Weber State ^	6	–	2	7	–	5
No. 24 Cal Poly ^	5	–	3	7	–	5
Southern Utah	5	–	3	6	–	5
Northern Colorado	4	–	4	6	–	5
Northern Arizona	4	–	4	5	–	6
Montana	3	–	5	6	–	5
Montana State	2	–	6	4	–	7
Portland State	2	–	6	3	–	8
UC Davis	2	–	6	3	–	8
Sacramento State	2	–	6	2	–	9
Idaho State	1	–	7	2	–	9
$ – Conference champion; ^ – FCS playoff participant; Rankings from STATS Poll

The 2016 Northern Colorado Bears football team represented the University of Northern Colorado in the 2016 NCAA Division I FCS football season. They were led by sixth-year head coach Earnest Collins Jr. and played their home games at Nottingham Field. They were a member of the Big Sky Conference. They finished the season 6–5, 4–4 in Big Sky play to finish in a tie for sixth place.

== Schedule ==
Date	Time	Opponent	Site	TV	Result	Attendance
September 3	2:00 pm	Rocky Mountain (MT)*	Nottingham Field; Greeley, CO	WBS	W 56–27	4,319
September 10	5:00 pm	at Abilene Christian*	Shotwell Stadium; Abilene, TX	ACUSports	W 55–52	8,348
September 17	2:05 pm	at Colorado State*	Hughes Stadium; Fort Collins, CO	RTRM	L 21–47	26,718
October 1	1:05 pm	Northern Arizona	Nottingham Field; Greeley, CO	CET	W 21–18	5,478
October 8	2:05 pm	at No. 4 Eastern Washington	Roos Field; Cheney, WA	WBS	L 31–49	10,924
October 15	3:00 pm	at UC Davis	Aggie Stadium; Davis, CA	WBS	L 21–34	6,251
October 22	1:05 pm	Sacramento State^{†}	Nottingham Field; Greeley, CO	CET	W 27–19	5,232
October 29	3:30 pm	at Portland State	Providence Park; Portland, OR	WBS	W 56–49 ^{OT}	3,446
November 5	12:05 pm	No. 16 North Dakota	Nottingham Field; Greeley, CO	CET	L 13–23	4,322
November 12	12:05 pm	No. 18 Montana	Nottingham Field; Greeley, CO	CET	W 28–25	5,128
November 19	7:05 pm	at No. 21 Cal Poly	Alex G. Spanos Stadium; San Luis Obispo, CA	WBS	L 48–55	6,863
*Non-conference game; ^{†}Homecoming; Rankings from STATS Poll released prior to the game; All times are in Mountain time

- Source: Schedule

== Game summaries ==
=== Rocky Mountain (MT) ===
	1	2	3	4	Total
Battlin' Bears	0	0	10	17	27
Bears	28	14	0	14	56

=== At Abilene Christian ===
	1	2	3	4	Total
Bears	21	14	13	7	55
Wildcats	7	21	21	3	52

=== At Colorado State ===
	1	2	3	4	Total
Bears	0	0	14	7	21
Rams	21	17	3	6	47

=== Northern Arizona ===
	1	2	3	4	Total
Lumberjacks	7	3	0	8	18
Bears	14	7	0	0	21

=== At Eastern Washington ===
	1	2	3	4	Total
Bears	7	10	7	7	31
#4 Eagles	3	11	21	14	49

=== At UC Davis ===
	1	2	3	4	Total
Bears	7	7	7	0	21
Aggies	10	7	7	10	34

=== Sacramento State ===
	1	2	3	4	Total
Hornets	3	7	3	6	19
Bears	7	0	10	10	27

=== At Portland State ===
	1	2	3	4	OT	Total
Bears	3	10	29	7	7	56
Vikings	7	14	14	14	0	49

=== North Dakota ===
	1	2	3	4	Total
#16 Fighting Hawks	7	6	10	0	23
Bears	7	0	0	6	13

=== Montana ===
	1	2	3	4	Total
#18 Grizzlies	3	9	0	13	25
Bears	14	0	7	7	28

=== At Cal Poly ===
	1	2	3	4	Total
Bears	7	17	7	17	48
#21 Mustangs	21	13	7	14	55
