= 2016 Northern Arizona Lumberjacks football team =

American college football season

2016 Northern Arizona Lumberjacks football
- Conference: Big Sky Conference
- Record: 5–6 (4–4 Big Sky)
- Head coach: Jerome Souers (19th season)
- Offensive coordinator: Tim Plough (2nd season)
- Defensive coordinator: Andy Thompson (8th season)
- Home stadium: Walkup Skydome

2016 Big Sky Conference football standings
	Conf.			Overall
Team	W		L	W		L
No. 4 Eastern Washington +^	8	–	0	12	–	2
No. 12 North Dakota +^	8	–	0	9	–	3
No. 25 Weber State ^	6	–	2	7	–	5
No. 24 Cal Poly ^	5	–	3	7	–	5
Southern Utah	5	–	3	6	–	5
Northern Colorado	4	–	4	6	–	5
Northern Arizona	4	–	4	5	–	6
Montana	3	–	5	6	–	5
Montana State	2	–	6	4	–	7
Portland State	2	–	6	3	–	8
UC Davis	2	–	6	3	–	8
Sacramento State	2	–	6	2	–	9
Idaho State	1	–	7	2	–	9
$ – Conference champion; ^ – FCS playoff participant; Rankings from STATS Poll

The 2016 Northern Arizona Lumberjacks football team represented Northern Arizona University in the 2016 NCAA Division I FCS football season. They were led by 19th-year head coach Jerome Souers and played their home games at the Walkup Skydome. They were a member of the Big Sky Conference. They finished the season 5–6, 4–4 in Big Sky play to finish in a tie for sixth place.

== Schedule ==
Date	Time	Opponent	Rank	Site	TV	Result	Attendance
September 3	7:45 pm	at Arizona State*	No. 18	Sun Devil Stadium; Tempe, AZ	P12N	L 13–44	45,300
September 10	1:00 pm	at No. 18 Western Illinois*	No. 19	Hanson Field; Macomb, IL	ESPN3	L 20–34	6,732
September 17	4:00 pm	New Mexico Highlands*	No. 24	Walkup Skydome; Flagstaff, AZ	NAU-TV, FSAZ	W 73–3	8,711
September 24	4:00 pm	No. 4 Eastern Washington		Walkup Skydome; Flagstaff, AZ	NAU-TV, FSAZ	L 35–50	10,179
October 1	12:00 pm	at Northern Colorado		Nottingham Field; Greeley, CO	CET	L 18–21	5,478
October 8	4:00 pm	at Montana State		Bobcat Stadium; Bozeman, MT	RTNW	W 20–14	17,637
October 15	4:00 pm	Idaho State^{†}		Walkup Skydome; Flagstaff, AZ	NAU-TV, FSAZ	W 52–7	7,836
October 22	4:00 pm	No. 10 Montana		Walkup Skydome; Flagstaff, AZ	NAU-TV, FSAZ	W 45–34	7,197
November 5	11:00 am	at Weber State		Stewart Stadium; Ogden, UT	KJZZ	W 33–20	8,740
November 12	12:00 pm	at No. 12 North Dakota		Alerus Center; Grand Forks, ND	Midco SN	L 31–38	9,049
November 19	2:00 pm	Southern Utah		Walkup Skydome; Flagstaff, AZ (Grand Canyon Rivalry)	NAU-TV, FSAZ	L 21–48	5,626
*Non-conference game; ^{†}Homecoming; Rankings from STATS Poll released prior to the game; All times are in Mountain time

== Game summaries ==
=== At Arizona State ===
	1	2	3	4	Total
#18 Lumberjacks	0	3	3	7	13
Sun Devils	7	3	10	24	44

=== At Western Illinois ===
	1	2	3	4	Total
#19 Lumberjacks	13	0	7	0	20
#18 Leathernecks	3	10	14	7	34

=== New Mexico Highlands ===
	1	2	3	4	Total
Cowboys	0	3	0	0	3
#24 Lumberjacks	28	21	24	0	73

=== Eastern Washington ===
	1	2	3	4	Total
#4 Eagles	12	10	14	14	50
Lumberjacks	7	14	7	7	35

=== At Northern Colorado ===
	1	2	3	4	Total
Lumberjacks	7	3	0	8	18
Bears	14	7	0	0	21

=== At Montana State ===
	1	2	3	4	Total
Lumberjacks	0	10	10	0	20
Bobcats	0	0	7	7	14

=== Idaho State ===
	1	2	3	4	Total
Bengals	0	0	0	7	7
Lumberjacks	14	14	7	17	52

=== Montana ===
	1	2	3	4	Total
#10 Grizzlies	3	17	0	14	34
Lumberjacks	14	14	17	0	45

=== At Weber State ===
	1	2	3	4	Total
Lumberjacks	10	10	3	10	33
Wildcats	0	7	7	6	20

=== At North Dakota ===
	1	2	3	4	Total
Lumberjacks	14	10	7	0	31
#12 Fighting Hawks	10	0	7	21	38

=== Southern Utah ===
	1	2	3	4	Total
Thunderbirds	14	14	20	0	48
Lumberjacks	14	7	0	0	21

== Ranking movements ==
Ranking movements Legend: ██ Increase in ranking ██ Decrease in ranking — = Not ranked RV = Received votes т = Tied with team above or below
	Week													
Poll	Pre	1	2	3	4	5	6	7	8	9	10	11	12	Final
STATS FCS	18	19	24	RV	RV	RV	RV	—	RV	RV	RV	RV		
Coaches	18	17	24	25–T	RV	—	—	—	RV	RV	RV	RV		
