= 2016 UC Davis Aggies football team =

American college football season

2016 UC Davis Aggies football
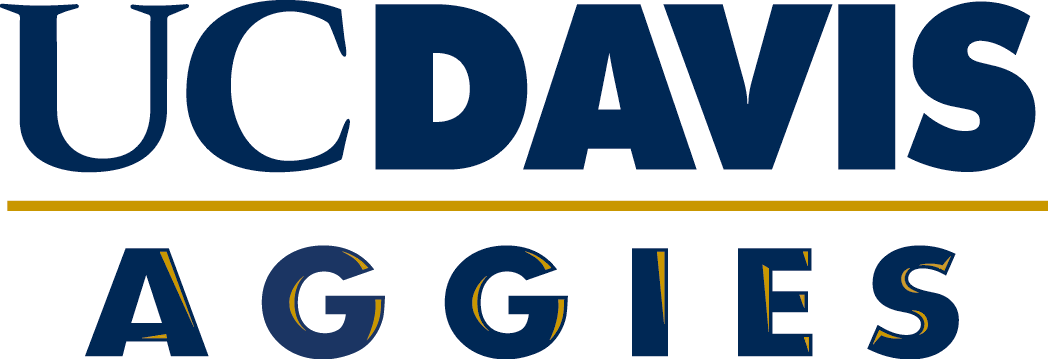
- Conference: Big Sky Conference
- Record: 3–8 (2–6 Big Sky)
- Head coach: Ron Gould (4th season)
- Offensive coordinator: Kevin Daft (5th season)
- Defensive coordinator: Bert Watts (4th season)
- Home stadium: Aggie Stadium

2016 Big Sky Conference football standings
	Conf.			Overall
Team	W		L	W		L
No. 4 Eastern Washington +^	8	–	0	12	–	2
No. 12 North Dakota +^	8	–	0	9	–	3
No. 25 Weber State ^	6	–	2	7	–	5
No. 24 Cal Poly ^	5	–	3	7	–	5
Southern Utah	5	–	3	6	–	5
Northern Colorado	4	–	4	6	–	5
Northern Arizona	4	–	4	5	–	6
Montana	3	–	5	6	–	5
Montana State	2	–	6	4	–	7
Portland State	2	–	6	3	–	8
UC Davis	2	–	6	3	–	8
Sacramento State	2	–	6	2	–	9
Idaho State	1	–	7	2	–	9
$ – Conference champion; ^ – FCS playoff participant; Rankings from STATS Poll

The 2016 UC Davis football team represented the University of California, Davis as a member of the Big Sky Conference during the 2016 NCAA Division I FCS football season. Led by Ron Gould in his fourth and final season as head coach, UC Davis compiled an overall record of 3–8 with a mark of 2–6 in conference play, placing in four-way tie for ninth in the Big Sky. The Aggies played home games at Aggie Stadium in Davis, California.

Gould was fired on November 21. He finished his tenure at UC Davis with an overall record of 12–33.

== Schedule ==
Date	Time	Opponent	Site	TV	Result	Attendance
September 3	2:00 pm	at No. 24 (FBS) Oregon*	Autzen Stadium; Eugene, OR	P12N	L 28–53	53,817
September 10	6:00 pm	Southern Oregon*	Aggie Stadium; Davis, CA	WBS	W 52–35	5,433
September 17	1:00 pm	at Wyoming*	War Memorial Stadium; Laramie, WY	CI	L 22–45	18,781
September 24	6:00 pm	Weber State	Aggie Stadium; Davis, CA	WBS	L 35–38	8,426
October 1	1:00 pm	at No. 4 Eastern Washington	Roos Field; Cheney, WA	RTNW	L 30–63	10,741
October 8	5:00 pm	at Southern Utah	Eccles Coliseum; Cedar City, UT	WBS	L 3–24	8,107
October 15	4:00 pm	Northern Colorado^{†}	Aggie Stadium; Davis, CA	WBS	W 34–21	6,251
October 22	6:05 pm	at No. T–17 Cal Poly	Alex G. Spanos Stadium; San Luis Obispo, CA (Battle for the Golden Horseshoe)	WBS	L 16–21	11,075
November 5	4:00 pm	Portland State	Aggie Stadium; Davis, CA	WBS	L 29–51	5,665
November 12	12:30 pm	at Montana State	Bobcat Stadium; Bozeman, MT	RTNW	L 13–27	15,767
November 19	1:00 pm	Sacramento State	Aggie Stadium; Davis, CA (Causeway Classic)	CSNCA	W 48–30	6,156
*Non-conference game; ^{†}Homecoming; Rankings from STATS Poll released prior to the game; All times are in Pacific time

== Game summaries ==
=== At Oregon ===
	1	2	3	4	Total
Aggies	7	0	14	7	28
#24 (FBS) Ducks	8	17	14	14	53

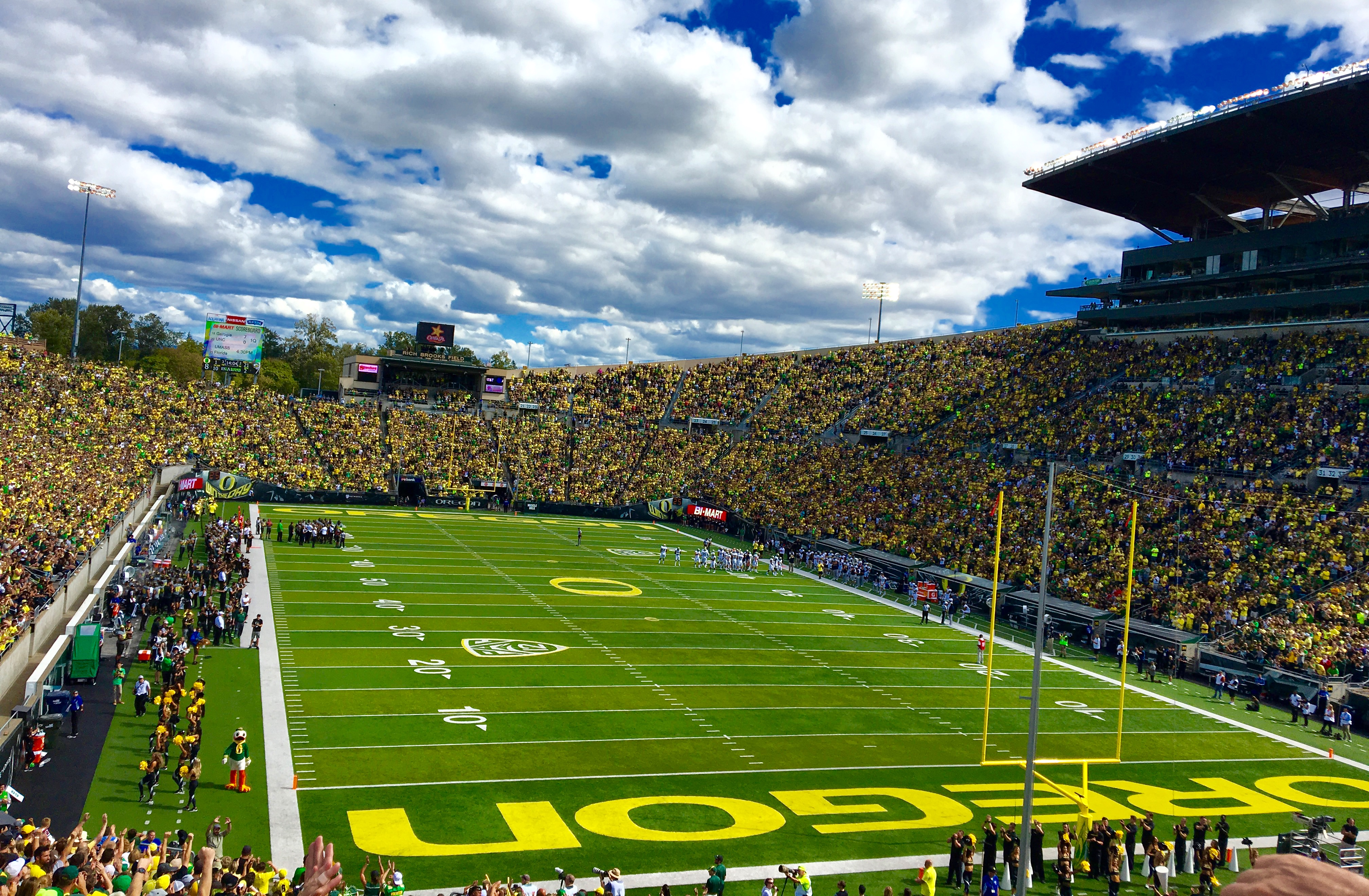
Opening game vs. Oregon Ducks, September 3, 2016.

=== Southern Oregon ===
	1	2	3	4	Total
Raiders	14	7	0	14	35
Aggies	21	14	10	7	52

=== At Wyoming ===
	1	2	3	4	Total
Aggies	3	6	6	7	22
Cowboys	14	21	10	0	45

=== Weber State ===
	1	2	3	4	Total
Wildcats	8	17	7	6	38
Aggies	10	3	0	22	35

=== at Eastern Washington ===
	1	2	3	4	Total
Aggies	0	23	7	0	30
#4 Eagles	14	0	35	14	63

=== At Southern Utah ===
	1	2	3	4	Total
Aggies	0	3	0	0	3
Thunderbirds	0	21	3	0	24

=== Northern Colorado ===
	1	2	3	4	Total
Bears	7	7	7	0	21
Aggies	10	7	7	10	34

=== At Cal Poly ===
	1	2	3	4	Total
Aggies	6	3	0	7	16
#17–T Mustangs	0	7	7	7	21

=== Portland State ===
	1	2	3	4	Total
Vikings	10	20	14	7	51
Aggies	6	10	0	13	29

=== At Montana State ===
	1	2	3	4	Total
Aggies	7	6	0	0	13
Bobcats	0	17	0	10	27

=== Sacramento State ===
	1	2	3	4	Total
Hornets	7	10	10	3	30
Aggies	14	20	7	7	48
