= 2016 Sacramento State Hornets football team =

American college football season

2016 Sacramento State Hornets football
- Conference: Big Sky Conference
- Record: 2–9 (2–6 Big Sky)
- Head coach: Jody Sears (3rd season)
- Co-offensive coordinators: Paul Peterson (5th season); Paul Wulff (1st season)
- Defensive coordinator: Sammy Lawanson (1st season)
- Home stadium: Hornet Stadium

2016 Big Sky Conference football standings
	Conf.			Overall
Team	W		L	W		L
No. 4 Eastern Washington +^	8	–	0	12	–	2
No. 12 North Dakota +^	8	–	0	9	–	3
No. 25 Weber State ^	6	–	2	7	–	5
No. 24 Cal Poly ^	5	–	3	7	–	5
Southern Utah	5	–	3	6	–	5
Northern Colorado	4	–	4	6	–	5
Northern Arizona	4	–	4	5	–	6
Montana	3	–	5	6	–	5
Montana State	2	–	6	4	–	7
Portland State	2	–	6	3	–	8
UC Davis	2	–	6	3	–	8
Sacramento State	2	–	6	2	–	9
Idaho State	1	–	7	2	–	9
$ – Conference champion; ^ – FCS playoff participant; Rankings from STATS Poll

The 2016 Sacramento State Hornets football team represented California State University, Sacramento as a member of the Big Sky Conference during the 2016 NCAA Division I FCS football season. Led by third-year head coach Jody Sears, Sacramento State compiled an overall record of 2–9 with a mark of 2–6 in conference play, placing in a four-way tie for ninth in the Big Sky. The Hornets played home games at Hornet Stadium in Sacramento, California.

== Schedule ==
Date	Time	Opponent	Site	TV	Result	Attendance
September 3	6:05 pm	Western Oregon*	Hornet Stadium; Sacramento, CA	WBS	L 30–38	6,558
September 10	7:00 pm	at Fresno State*	Bulldog Stadium; Fresno, CA		L 3–31	31,817
September 17	5:00 pm	at Weber State*	Stewart Stadium; Ogden, UT	KJZZ-TV/WBS	L 7–14	9,746
September 24	1:35 pm	at Idaho State	Holt Arena; Pocatello, ID	WBS	L 34–42	7,303
October 1	6:00 pm	Montana State	Hornet Stadium; Sacramento, CA	WBS	W 41–38	7,759
October 8	6:00 pm	No. 24 North Dakota^{†}	Hornet Stadium; Sacramento, CA	WBS	L 7–40	9,614
October 15	1:30 pm	at No. 10 Montana	Washington–Grizzly Stadium; Missoula, MT	CMM/WBS	L 7–68	25,351
October 22	12:00 pm	at Northern Colorado	Nottingham Field; Greeley, CO	WBS	L 19–27	5,232
October 29	6:00 pm	No. 14 Cal Poly	Hornet Stadium; Sacramento, CA	WBS	L 47–59	5,334
November 12	6:00 pm	Portland State	Hornet Stadium; Sacramento, CA	WBS	W 42–35	5,086
November 19	1:00 pm	at UC Davis	Aggie Stadium; Davis, CA (Causeway Classic)	CSNCA	L 30–48	6,156
*Non-conference game; ^{†}Homecoming; Rankings from STATS Poll released prior to the game; All times are in Pacific time

Despite Weber State also being a member of the Big Sky Conference, the September 17 game against Sacramento State was considered a non-conference game.

== Game summaries ==
=== Western Oregon ===
	1	2	3	4	Total
Wolves	14	7	3	14	38
Hornets	3	13	0	14	30

=== At Fresno State ===
	1	2	3	4	Total
Hornets	0	3	0	0	3
Bulldogs	7	3	0	21	31

=== At Weber State ===
	1	2	3	4	Total
Hornets	0	7	0	0	7
Wildcats	0	7	0	7	14

=== At Idaho State ===
	1	2	3	4	Total
Hornets	0	14	3	17	34
Bengals	7	14	14	7	42

=== Montana State ===
	1	2	3	4	Total
Bobcats	3	21	14	0	38
Hornets	7	14	0	20	41

=== North Dakota ===
	1	2	3	4	Total
#24 Fighting Hawks	6	21	7	6	40
Hornets	0	0	7	0	7

=== At Montana ===
	1	2	3	4	Total
Hornets	0	0	0	7	7
#10 Grizzlies	14	27	20	7	68

=== At Northern Colorado ===
	1	2	3	4	Total
Hornets	3	7	3	6	19
Bears	7	0	10	10	27

=== Cal Poly ===
	1	2	3	4	Total
#14 Mustangs	14	3	21	21	59
Hornets	7	14	0	26	47

=== Portland State ===
	1	2	3	4	Total
Vikings	7	14	7	7	35
Hornets	7	14	14	7	42

=== At UC Davis ===
	1	2	3	4	Total
Hornets	7	10	10	3	30
Aggies	14	20	7	7	48
