= 2016 Idaho State Bengals football team =

American college football season

2016 Idaho State Bengals football
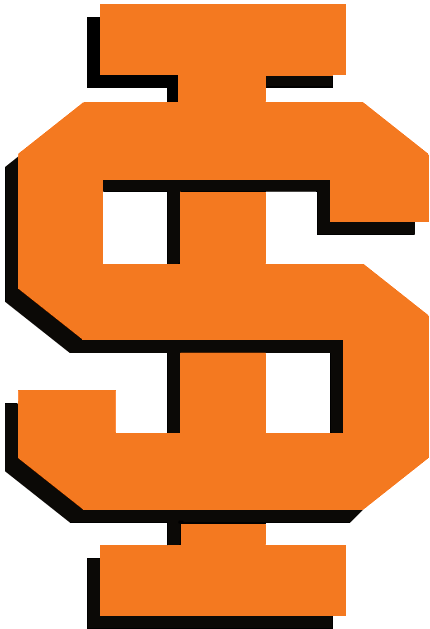
- Conference: Big Sky Conference
- Record: 2–9 (1–7 Big Sky)
- Head coach: Mike Kramer (6th season)
- Offensive coordinator: Sheldon Cross (2nd season)
- Defensive coordinator: Spencer Toone (5th season)
- Home stadium: Holt Arena

2016 Big Sky Conference football standings
	Conf.			Overall
Team	W		L	W		L
No. 4 Eastern Washington +^	8	–	0	12	–	2
No. 12 North Dakota +^	8	–	0	9	–	3
No. 25 Weber State ^	6	–	2	7	–	5
No. 24 Cal Poly ^	5	–	3	7	–	5
Southern Utah	5	–	3	6	–	5
Northern Colorado	4	–	4	6	–	5
Northern Arizona	4	–	4	5	–	6
Montana	3	–	5	6	–	5
Montana State	2	–	6	4	–	7
Portland State	2	–	6	3	–	8
UC Davis	2	–	6	3	–	8
Sacramento State	2	–	6	2	–	9
Idaho State	1	–	7	2	–	9
$ – Conference champion; ^ – FCS playoff participant; Rankings from STATS Poll

The 2016 Idaho State Bengals football team represented Idaho State University as a member of the Big Sky Conference during the 2016 NCAA Division I FCS football season. Led by Mike Kramer in his sixth and final year as head coach, the Bengals compiled an overall record of 2–9 with a mark of 1–7 in conference play, placing last out of 13 teams in the Big Sky. Idaho State played their home games at Holt Arena in Pocatello, Idaho.

On March 30, 2017, Kramer announced his retirement.<ref[>http://www.idahostatesman.com/sports/college/state-college-sports/article141788559.html College sports news] Idaho Statesman (subscription required)</ref> He finished at Idaho State with a six-year record of 18–50.

== Schedule ==
Date	Time	Opponent	Site	TV	Result	Attendance
September 3	2:35 pm	Simon Fraser*	Holt Arena; Pocatello, ID	Eversport.tv	W 47–3	5,539
September 10	3:30 pm	at Colorado*	Folsom Field; Boulder, CO	P12N	L 7–56	39,505
September 17	3:00 pm	at Oregon State*	Reser Stadium; Corvallis, OR	P12N	L 7–37	38,052
September 24	2:35 pm	Sacramento State^{†}	Holt Arena; Pocatello, ID	Eversport.tv	W 42–34	7,303
October 1	3:30 pm	at Portland State	Providence Park; Portland, OR	Eversport.tv	L 20–45	4,916
October 15	5:00 pm	at Northern Arizona	Walkup Skydome; Flagstaff, AZ	NAU-TV, FSAZ	L 7–52	7,836
October 22	2:35 pm	No. 19 North Dakota	Holt Arena; Pocatello, ID	Eversport.tv	L 21–28	6,328
October 29	2:35 pm	Southern Utah	Holt Arena; Pocatello, ID	Eversport.tv	L 27–52	4,667
November 5	5:00 pm	at No. 19 Montana	Washington–Grizzly Stadium; Missoula, MT	RTNW	L 44–62	24,027
November 12	4:35 pm	at No. 3 Eastern Washington	Roos Field; Cheney, WA	Eversport.tv, SWX	L 17–48	9,302
November 19	2:35 pm	Weber State	Holt Arena; Pocatello, ID	Eversport.tv	L 28–34	5,464
*Non-conference game; ^{†}Homecoming; Rankings from STATS Poll released prior to the game; All times are in Mountain time

== Game summaries ==
=== Simon Fraser ===
	1	2	3	4	Total
Clan	0	0	3	0	3
Bengals	7	19	7	14	47

=== At Colorado ===
	1	2	3	4	Total
Bengals	0	0	7	0	7
Buffaloes	14	35	7	0	56

=== At Oregon State ===
	1	2	3	4	Total
Bengals	0	0	7	0	7
Beavers	13	10	14	0	37

=== Sacramento State ===
	1	2	3	4	Total
Hornets	0	14	3	17	34
Bengals	7	14	14	7	42

=== At Portland State ===
	1	2	3	4	Total
Bengals	6	0	0	14	20
Vikings	14	17	7	7	45

=== At Northern Arizona ===
	1	2	3	4	Total
Bengals	0	0	0	7	7
Lumberjacks	14	14	7	17	52

=== North Dakota ===
	1	2	3	4	Total
#19 Fighting Hawks	0	14	7	7	28
Bengals	7	7	0	7	21

=== Southern Utah ===
	1	2	3	4	Total
Thunderbirds	7	10	21	14	52
Bengals	7	6	7	7	27

=== At Montana ===
	1	2	3	4	Total
Bengals	14	17	0	13	44
#19 Grizzlies	20	21	0	21	62

=== At Eastern Washington ===
	1	2	3	4	Total
Bengals	3	7	7	0	17
#3 Eagles	7	13	14	14	48

=== Weber State ===
	1	2	3	4	Total
Wildcats	14	3	7	10	34
Bengals	7	14	0	7	28
