= 2016 Montana State Bobcats football team =

American college football season

2016 Montana State Bobcats football
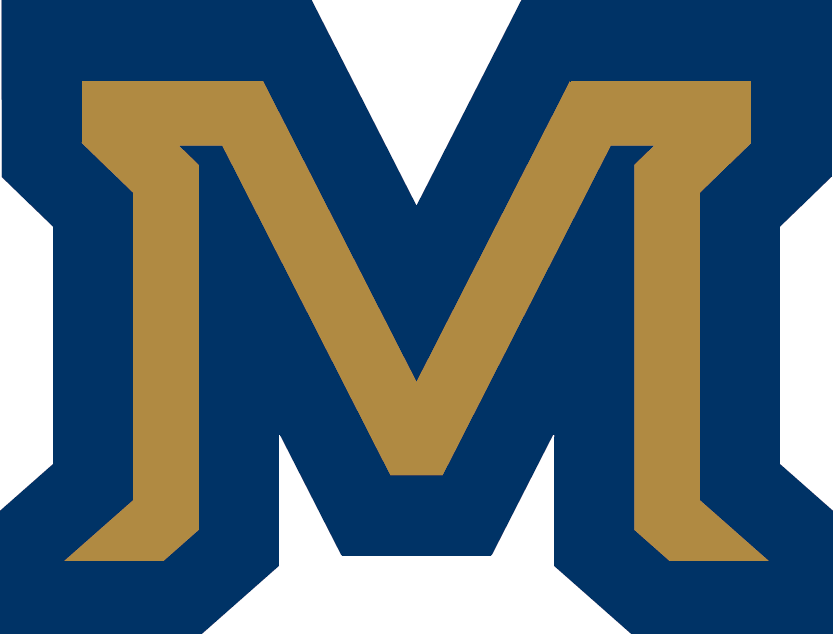
- Conference: Big Sky Conference
- Record: 4–7 (2–6 Big Sky)
- Head coach: Jeff Choate (1st season)
- Offensive coordinator: Courtney Messingham (1st season)
- Offensive scheme: Multiple
- Defensive coordinator: Ty Gregorak (1st season)
- Base defense: 4–3
- Home stadium: Bobcat Stadium

2016 Big Sky Conference football standings
| | Conf. | | | Overall |
| Team | W | | L | W | | L |
|---|---|---|---|---|---|---|
| No. 4 Eastern Washington +^ | 8 | – | 0 | 12 | – | 2 |
| No. 12 North Dakota +^ | 8 | – | 0 | 9 | – | 3 |
| No. 25 Weber State ^ | 6 | – | 2 | 7 | – | 5 |
| No. 24 Cal Poly ^ | 5 | – | 3 | 7 | – | 5 |
| Southern Utah | 5 | – | 3 | 6 | – | 5 |
| Northern Colorado | 4 | – | 4 | 6 | – | 5 |
| Northern Arizona | 4 | – | 4 | 5 | – | 6 |
| Montana | 3 | – | 5 | 6 | – | 5 |
| Montana State | 2 | – | 6 | 4 | – | 7 |
| Portland State | 2 | – | 6 | 3 | – | 8 |
| UC Davis | 2 | – | 6 | 3 | – | 8 |
| Sacramento State | 2 | – | 6 | 2 | – | 9 |
| Idaho State | 1 | – | 7 | 2 | – | 9 |
$ – Conference champion; ^ – FCS playoff participant; Rankings from STATS Poll

The 2016 Montana State Bobcats football team represented Montana State University as a member of the Big Sky Conference during the 2016 NCAA Division I FCS football season. Led by first-year head coach Jeff Choate, Montana State compiled an overall record of 4–7 with a mark of 2–6 in conference play, placing in a four-way tie for ninth place in the Big Sky. The Bobcats played their home games at Bobcat Stadium in Bozeman, Montana.

== Athletic director search ==
After 14 years as athletic director, Peter Fields's contract was not to be renewed for the 2016 season. On May 2, Montana State officially introduced Kyle Brennan as the new athletic director. However, on May 10, Brennan backed out of the job citing that the job "didn't feel right". Later that same day, MSU announced that they would hire Leon Costello as the new athletic director.

== Recruits ==
College recruiting information
| Name | Hometown | School | Height | Weight | Commit date |
|---|---|---|---|---|---|
| Chase Benson; DL | Helena, MT | Helena High School | 6 ft 3 in (1.91 m) | 242 lb (110 kg) | |
| Chase Benson; DL | Recruit ratings: No ratings found | | | | |
| Balue Chapman; LB | Bozeman, MT | Bozeman High School | 6 ft 1 in (1.85 m) | 189 lb (86 kg) | |
| Balue Chapman; LB | Recruit ratings: No ratings found | | | | |
| Anthony Pegues; RB | Frisco, TX | Centennial High School | 5 ft 8 in (1.73 m) | 180 lb (82 kg) | Feb 3, 2016 |
| Anthony Pegues; RB | Recruit ratings: Scout: Rivals: 247Sports: | | | | |
Overall recruit ranking:
‡ Refers to 40-yard dash; Note: In many cases, Scout, Rivals, 247Sports, On3, and ESPN may conflict in their listings of height, weight and 40 time.; In these cases, the average was taken. ESPN grades are on a 100-point scale.; Sources: "2016 Team Ranking". Rivals.com.; "2016 Montana State Bobcats football team". 247Sports.

== Schedule ==
| Date | Time | Opponent | Site | TV | Result | Attendance |
|---|---|---|---|---|---|---|
| September 1 | 7:00 pm | at Idaho* | Kibbie Dome; Moscow, ID | ESPN3 | L 17–20 | 11,987 |
| September 10 | 2:05 pm | Bryant* | Bobcat Stadium; Bozeman, MT | CMM | W 27–24 | 18,867 |
| September 17 | 2:05 pm | Western Oregon* | Bobcat Stadium; Bozeman, MT | CMM | W 55–0 | 17,577 |
| September 24 | 2:05 pm | North Dakota | Bobcat Stadium; Bozeman, MT | CMM | L 15–17 | 19,507 |
| October 1 | 7:05 pm | at Sacramento State | Hornet Stadium; Sacramento, CA | CMM | L 38–41 | 7,759 |
| October 8 | 5:10 pm | Northern Arizona | Bobcat Stadium; Bozeman, MT | RTNW | L 14–20 | 17,637 |
| October 15 | 1:40 pm | at Weber State | Stewart Stadium; Odgen, UT | RTNW | L 27–45 | 7,148 |
| October 22 | 12:10 pm | No. 3 Eastern Washington | Bobcat Stadium; Bozeman, MT | RTNW | L 17–41 | 18,087 |
| November 5 | 12:05 pm | at Southern Utah | Eccles Coliseum; Cedar City, UT | CMM | L 21–38 | 7,342 |
| November 12 | 1:30 pm | UC Davis | Bobcat Stadium; Bozeman, MT | RTNW | W 27–13 | 15,767 |
| November 19 | 12:00 pm | at No. 22 Montana | Washington–Grizzly Stadium; Missoula, MT (rivalry) | RTNW | W 24–17 | 26,182 |
*Non-conference game; Rankings from STATS Poll released prior to the game; All times are in Mountain time

== Game summaries ==
=== At Idaho ===
| | 1 | 2 | 3 | 4 | Total |
|---|---|---|---|---|---|
| Bobcats | 7 | 3 | 7 | 0 | 17 |
| Vandals | 17 | 3 | 0 | 0 | 20 |

=== Bryant ===
| | 1 | 2 | 3 | 4 | Total |
|---|---|---|---|---|---|
| Bulldogs | 3 | 7 | 7 | 7 | 24 |
| Bobcats | 0 | 14 | 13 | 0 | 27 |

=== Western Oregon ===
| | 1 | 2 | 3 | 4 | Total |
|---|---|---|---|---|---|
| Wolves | 0 | 0 | 0 | 0 | 0 |
| Bobcats | 3 | 31 | 7 | 14 | 55 |

=== North Dakota ===
| | 1 | 2 | 3 | 4 | Total |
|---|---|---|---|---|---|
| Fighting Hawks | 0 | 7 | 3 | 7 | 17 |
| Bobcats | 3 | 3 | 3 | 6 | 15 |

=== At Sacramento State ===
| | 1 | 2 | 3 | 4 | Total |
|---|---|---|---|---|---|
| Bobcats | 3 | 21 | 14 | 0 | 38 |
| Hornets | 7 | 14 | 0 | 20 | 41 |

=== Northern Arizona ===
| | 1 | 2 | 3 | 4 | Total |
|---|---|---|---|---|---|
| Lumberjacks | 0 | 10 | 10 | 0 | 20 |
| Bobcats | 0 | 0 | 7 | 7 | 14 |

=== At Weber State ===
| | 1 | 2 | 3 | 4 | Total |
|---|---|---|---|---|---|
| Bobcats | 7 | 7 | 7 | 6 | 27 |
| Wildcats | 21 | 21 | 0 | 3 | 45 |

=== Eastern Washington ===
| | 1 | 2 | 3 | 4 | Total |
|---|---|---|---|---|---|
| #3 Eagles | 14 | 10 | 7 | 10 | 41 |
| Bobcats | 14 | 3 | 0 | 0 | 17 |

=== At Southern Utah ===
| | 1 | 2 | 3 | 4 | Total |
|---|---|---|---|---|---|
| Bobcats | 7 | 7 | 0 | 7 | 21 |
| Thunderbirds | 0 | 14 | 10 | 14 | 38 |

=== UC Davis ===
| | 1 | 2 | 3 | 4 | Total |
|---|---|---|---|---|---|
| Aggies | 7 | 6 | 0 | 0 | 13 |
| Bobcats | 0 | 17 | 0 | 10 | 27 |

=== At Montana ===
| | 1 | 2 | 3 | 4 | Total |
|---|---|---|---|---|---|
| Bobcats | 7 | 7 | 10 | 0 | 24 |
| #22 Grizzlies | 7 | 0 | 3 | 7 | 17 |
