= 2016 Cal Poly Mustangs football team =

American college football season

2016 Cal Poly Mustangs football

NCAA Division I First Round, L 21–35 vs. San Diego
- Conference: Big Sky Conference

Ranking
- STATS: No. 24
- FCS Coaches: No. T–21
- Record: 7–5 (5–3 Big Sky)
- Head coach: Tim Walsh (8th season)
- Offensive coordinator: Juston Wood (1st season)
- Offensive scheme: Spread triple-option
- Defensive coordinator: Josh Brown (5th season)
- Base defense: 3–4
- Home stadium: Alex G. Spanos Stadium

2016 Big Sky Conference football standings
	Conf.			Overall
Team	W		L	W		L
No. 4 Eastern Washington +^	8	–	0	12	–	2
No. 12 North Dakota +^	8	–	0	9	–	3
No. 25 Weber State ^	6	–	2	7	–	5
No. 24 Cal Poly ^	5	–	3	7	–	5
Southern Utah	5	–	3	6	–	5
Northern Colorado	4	–	4	6	–	5
Northern Arizona	4	–	4	5	–	6
Montana	3	–	5	6	–	5
Montana State	2	–	6	4	–	7
Portland State	2	–	6	3	–	8
UC Davis	2	–	6	3	–	8
Sacramento State	2	–	6	2	–	9
Idaho State	1	–	7	2	–	9
$ – Conference champion; ^ – FCS playoff participant; Rankings from STATS Poll

The 2016 Cal Poly Mustangs football team represented California Polytechnic State University, San Luis Obispo as member of the Big Sky Conference during the 2016 NCAA Division I FCS football season. Led by eighth-year head coach Tim Walsh, Cal Poly compiled an overall record of 7–5 with a mark of 5–3 in conference play, tying for fourth place in the Big Sky. The Mustangs received an at-large bid to the NCAA Division I Football Championship playoffs, where they lost to San Diego in the first round. The team played home games at Mustang Stadium in San Luis Obispo, California.

== Schedule ==
Date	Time	Opponent	Rank	Site	TV	Result	Attendance
September 3	6:30 pm	at Nevada*		Mackay Stadium; Reno, NV	Campus Insiders	L 27–30 ^{OT}	19,138
September 10	6:05 pm	San Diego*		Alex G. Spanos Stadium; San Luis Obispo, CA	GoPoly	W 38–16	6,251
September 17	4:00 pm	at No. 9 South Dakota State*		Dana J. Dykhouse Stadium; Brookings, SD	ESPN3	W 38–31	16,887
September 24	12:00 pm	No. 6 Montana		Alex G. Spanos Stadium; San Luis Obispo, CA	RTNW	W 42–41	8,156
October 1	11:00 am	at North Dakota	No. 16	Alerus Center; Grand Forks, ND	Midco SN	L 24–31	10,097
October 15	2:30 pm	at Portland State	No. 19	Providence Park; Portland, OR	GoPoly	W 55–35	4,019
October 22	6:05 pm	UC Davis^{†}	No. T–17	Alex G. Spanos Stadium; San Luis Obispo, CA (Battle for the Golden Horseshoe)	GoPoly	W 21–16	11,075
October 29	6:00 pm	at Sacramento State	No. 14	Hornet Stadium; Sacramento, CA	GoPoly	W 59–47	5,334
November 5	6:05 pm	No. 3 Eastern Washington	No. 14	Alex G. Spanos Stadium; San Luis Obispo, CA	GoPoly	L 21–42	9,722
November 12	11:00 am	at Weber State	No. 16	Stewart Stadium; Ogden, UT	KJZZ	L 15–22	7,821
November 19	6:05 pm	Northern Colorado	No. 21	Alex G. Spanos Stadium; San Luis Obispo, CA	GoPoly	W 55–48	6,863
November 26	4:00 pm	No. 24 San Diego*	No. 21	Alex G. Spanos Stadium; San Luis Obispo, CA (NCAA Division I First Round)	ESPN3	L 21–35	3,356
*Non-conference game; ^{†}Homecoming; Rankings from STATS Poll released prior to the game; All times are in Pacific time

== Rankings ==
Ranking movements Legend: ██ Increase in ranking ██ Decrease in ranking — = Not ranked RV = Received votes т = Tied with team above or below
	Week													
Poll	Pre	1	2	3	4	5	6	7	8	9	10	11	12	Final
STATS FCS	—	RV	RV	RV	16	21	19	17–T	14	14	16	21	21	24
Coaches	—	RV	RV	RV	18	22	20	18–T	17	16	20	23	20	21–T

== Game summaries ==
=== At Nevada ===
	1	2	3	4	OT	Total
Mustangs	7	3	0	14	3	27
Wolf Pack	21	3	0	0	6	30

=== San Diego ===
	1	2	3	4	Total
Toreros	0	13	0	3	16
Mustangs	10	7	14	7	38

=== At South Dakota State ===
	1	2	3	4	Total
Mustangs	7	10	0	21	38
#9 Jackrabbits	7	3	7	14	31

=== Montana ===
	1	2	3	4	Total
#6 Grizzlies	7	17	7	10	41
Mustangs	7	21	7	7	42

=== At North Dakota ===
	1	2	3	4	Total
#16 Mustangs	0	7	7	10	24
Fighting Hawks	10	0	14	7	31

=== At Portland State ===
	1	2	3	4	Total
#19 Mustangs	13	14	14	14	55
Vikings	7	7	14	7	35

=== UC Davis ===
	1	2	3	4	Total
Aggies	6	3	0	7	16
#17–T Mustangs	0	7	7	7	21

=== At Sacramento State ===
	1	2	3	4	Total
#14 Mustangs	14	3	21	21	59
Hornets	7	14	0	26	47

=== Eastern Washington ===
	1	2	3	4	Total
#3 Eagles	14	7	14	7	42
#14 Mustangs	7	7	7	0	21

=== At Weber State ===
	1	2	3	4	Total
#16 Mustangs	0	7	8	0	15
Wildcats	12	3	0	7	22

=== Northern Colorado ===
	1	2	3	4	Total
Bears	7	17	7	17	48
#21 Mustangs	21	13	7	14	55

=== San Diego–NCAA Division I First Round ===
	1	2	3	4	Total
#24 Toreros	14	0	7	14	35
#21 Mustangs	0	7	7	7	21
