= 2016 North Dakota Fighting Hawks football team =

American college football season

2016 North Dakota Fighting Hawks football

Big Sky co-champion

FCS Playoffs Second Round, L 27–24 vs. Richmond
- Conference: Big Sky Conference

Ranking
- STATS: No. 12
- FCS Coaches: No. 12
- Record: 9–3 (8–0 Big Sky)
- Head coach: Bubba Schweigert (3rd season)
- Offensive coordinator: Paul Rudolph (3rd season)
- Offensive scheme: Pistol
- Defensive coordinator: Eric Schmidt (3rd season)
- Base defense: 3–4
- Home stadium: Alerus Center

2016 Big Sky Conference football standings
	Conf.			Overall
Team	W		L	W		L
No. 4 Eastern Washington +^	8	–	0	12	–	2
No. 12 North Dakota +^	8	–	0	9	–	3
No. 25 Weber State ^	6	–	2	7	–	5
No. 24 Cal Poly ^	5	–	3	7	–	5
Southern Utah	5	–	3	6	–	5
Northern Colorado	4	–	4	6	–	5
Northern Arizona	4	–	4	5	–	6
Montana	3	–	5	6	–	5
Montana State	2	–	6	4	–	7
Portland State	2	–	6	3	–	8
UC Davis	2	–	6	3	–	8
Sacramento State	2	–	6	2	–	9
Idaho State	1	–	7	2	–	9
$ – Conference champion; ^ – FCS playoff participant; Rankings from STATS Poll

The 2016 North Dakota Fighting Hawks football team represented the University of North Dakota during the 2016 NCAA Division I FCS football season. They were led by third-year head coach Bubba Schweigert and played their home games at the Alerus Center. The Fighting Hawks were a member of the Big Sky Conference. They finished the season 9–3, 8–0 in Big Sky play to share the conference championship with Eastern Washington. They received an at-large bid into the FCS Playoffs where they lost to Richmond in the second round.

== Schedule ==
Date	Time	Opponent	Rank	Site	TV	Result	Attendance
September 3	6:00 pm	at Stony Brook*	No. 19	Kenneth P. LaValle Stadium; Stony Brook, NY		L 9–13	6,153
September 10	2:30 pm	at Bowling Green*	No. 25	Doyt Perry Stadium; Bowling Green, OH	ASN/ESPN3	L 26–27	15,318
September 17	4:00 pm	South Dakota*		Alerus Center; Grand Forks, ND (Potato Bowl, Sitting Bull Trophy)	Midco SN	W 47–44 ^{2OT}	11,477
September 24	3:00 pm	at Montana State		Bobcat Stadium; Bozeman, MT	WBS	W 17–15	19,507
October 1	1:00 pm	No. 16 Cal Poly		Alerus Center; Grand Forks, ND	Midco SN	W 31–24	10,097
October 8	8:00 pm	at Sacramento State	No. 24	Hornet Stadium; Sacramento, CA	WBS	W 40–7	9,614
October 15	1:00 pm	Southern Utah^{†}	No. 22	Alerus Center; Grand Forks, ND	Midco SN	W 45–23	10,506
October 22	3:35 pm	at Idaho State	No. 19	Holt Arena; Pocatello, ID	WBS	W 28–21	6,320
October 29	1:00 pm	Weber State	No. 17	Alerus Center; Grand Forks, ND	Midco SN2	W 27–19	8,699
November 5	1:05 pm	at Northern Colorado	No. 16	Nottingham Field; Greeley, CO	WBS	W 23–13	4,322
November 12	1:00 pm	Northern Arizona	No. 12	Alerus Center; Grand Forks, ND	Midco SN2	W 38–31	9,049
December 3	5:00 pm	No. 12 Richmond*	No. 8	Alerus Center; Grand Forks, ND (Second Round)	ESPN3	L 24–27	9,837
*Non-conference game; ^{†}Homecoming; Rankings from STATS Poll released prior to the game; All times are in Central time

== Game summaries ==
=== Stony Brook ===
	1	2	3	4	Total
#19 Fighting Hawks	0	7	2	0	9
Seawolves	0	7	0	6	13

=== Bowling Green ===
	1	2	3	4	Total
#25 Fighting Hawks	0	10	10	6	26
Falcons	14	7	6	0	27

=== South Dakota ===
	1	2	3	4	OT	2OT	Total
Coyotes	3	24	7	0	7	3	44
Fighting Hawks	7	7	3	17	7	6	47

=== Montana State ===
	1	2	3	4	Total
Fighting Hawks	0	7	3	7	17
Bobcats	3	3	3	6	15

=== Cal Poly ===
	1	2	3	4	Total
#16 Mustangs	0	7	7	10	24
Fighting Hawks	10	0	14	7	31

=== Sacramento State ===
	1	2	3	4	Total
#24 Fighting Hawks	6	21	7	6	40
Hornets	0	0	7	0	7

=== Southern Utah ===
	1	2	3	4	Total
Thunderbirds	14	3	6	0	23
#22 Fighting Hawks	7	21	3	14	45

=== Idaho State ===
	1	2	3	4	Total
#19 Fighting Hawks	0	14	7	7	28
Bengals	7	7	0	7	21

=== Weber State ===
	1	2	3	4	Total
Wildcats	0	13	0	6	19
#17 Fighting Hawks	7	0	14	6	27

=== Northern Colorado ===
	1	2	3	4	Total
#16 Fighting Hawks	7	6	10	0	23
Bears	7	0	0	6	13

=== Northern Arizona ===
	1	2	3	4	Total
Lumberjacks	14	10	7	0	31
#12 Fighting Hawks	10	0	7	21	38

== FCS Playoffs ==
=== Second Round–Richmond ===
	1	2	3	4	Total
#12 Spiders	7	0	7	13	27
#8 Fighting Hawks	7	10	7	0	24

== Ranking movements ==
Ranking movements Legend: ██ Increase in ranking ██ Decrease in ranking — = Not ranked RV = Received votes
	Week													
Poll	Pre	1	2	3	4	5	6	7	8	9	10	11	12	Final
STATS FCS	19	25	RV	RV	RV	24	22	19	17	16	12	10	8	12
Coaches	21	RV	RV	RV	RV	21	18	16	12	11	10	8	8	12
FCS Playoffs	Not released									—	10	9	Not released	
