= 2016 Portland State Vikings football team =

American college football season

2016 Portland State Vikings football
- Conference: Big Sky Conference
- Record: 3–8 (2–6 Big Sky)
- Head coach: Bruce Barnum (2nd season)
- Offensive coordinator: Steve Cooper (2nd season)
- Offensive scheme: Pistol
- Defensive coordinator: Malik Roberson (2nd season)
- Base defense: 3–3–5
- Home stadium: Providence Park

2016 Big Sky Conference football standings
	Conf.			Overall
Team	W		L	W		L
No. 4 Eastern Washington +^	8	–	0	12	–	2
No. 12 North Dakota +^	8	–	0	9	–	3
No. 25 Weber State ^	6	–	2	7	–	5
No. 24 Cal Poly ^	5	–	3	7	–	5
Southern Utah	5	–	3	6	–	5
Northern Colorado	4	–	4	6	–	5
Northern Arizona	4	–	4	5	–	6
Montana	3	–	5	6	–	5
Montana State	2	–	6	4	–	7
Portland State	2	–	6	3	–	8
UC Davis	2	–	6	3	–	8
Sacramento State	2	–	6	2	–	9
Idaho State	1	–	7	2	–	9
$ – Conference champion; ^ – FCS playoff participant; Rankings from STATS Poll

The 2016 Portland State Vikings football team represented Portland State University during the 2016 NCAA Division I FCS football season. They were led by second-year head coach Bruce Barnum and played their home games at Providence Park. They were a member of the Big Sky Conference. They finished the season 3–8, 2–6 in Big Sky play to finish in a four-way tie for ninth place.

== Preseason ==
=== Big Sky polls ===
On July 19, 2016, the Big Sky Conference released its preseason coaches' and media polls. The Vikings were predicted to finish tied for second in the coaches' poll and fifth in the media poll.

Coaches' poll
Predicted finish	Team	Votes (1st place)
1	Northern Arizona	132 (8)
2	Portland State	121 (2)
2	Montana	121
4	Eastern Washington	112 (2)
5	North Dakota	105 (1)
6	Weber State	83
7	Southern Utah	73
7	Montana State	73
9	Cal Poly	66
10	Northern Colorado	43
11	Sacramento State	30
12	Idaho State	24
13	UC Davis	23

Media poll
Predicted finish	Team	Votes (1st place)
1	Northern Arizona	287 (8)
2	Montana	283 (7)
3	Eastern Washington	269 (5)
4	North Dakota	262 (2)
5	Portland State	252 (3)
6	Weber State	174
7	Southern Utah	162
8	Montana State	157
9	Cal Poly	153
10	Northern Colorado	111
11	Idaho State	58
12	UC Davis	56
13	Sacramento State	50

== Schedule ==
Date	Time	Opponent	Rank	Site	TV	Result	Attendance
September 3	2:30 pm	Central Washington*	No. 17	Providence Park; Portland, OR	GoViks	W 43–26	4,898
September 10	1:30 pm	at San Jose State*	No. 16	CEFCU Stadium; San Jose, CA		L 35–66	13,210
September 17	5:00 pm	at No. 8 (FBS) Washington*	No. 19	Husky Stadium; Seattle, WA	P12N	L 3–41	57,151
September 24	5:00 pm	at Southern Utah	No. 25	Eccles Coliseum; Cedar City, UT	GoViks	L 31–45	10,306
October 1	2:30 pm	Idaho State		Providence Park; Portland, OR	Eversport.tv; GoViks	W 45–20	4,916
October 8	6:00 pm	at Weber State		Stewart Stadium; Ogden, UT	GoViks; KJZZ	L 10–14	10,217
October 15	2:30 pm	No. 19 Cal Poly		Providence Park; Portland, OR	GoViks	L 33–53	4,019
October 29	2:30 pm	Northern Colorado		Providence Park; Portland, OR	GoViks	L 49–56 ^{OT}	3,446
November 5	4:00 pm	at UC Davis		Aggie Stadium; Davis, CA	Eversport.tv	W 51–29	5,665
November 12	6:00 pm	at Sacramento State		Hornet Stadium; Sacramento, CA	Eversport.tv	L 35–42	5,086
November 18	7:00 pm	No. 3 Eastern Washington		Providence Park; Portland, OR (The Dam Cup)	RTNW	L 28–35	5,669
*Non-conference game; Rankings from STATS Poll released prior to the game; All times are in Pacific time

== Game summaries ==
=== Central Washington ===
	1	2	3	4	Total
Wildcats	7	12	7	0	26
No. 17 Vikings	7	14	0	22	43

Statistics	CWU	PRST
First downs	25	26
Total yards	445	508
Rushing yards	124	286
Passing yards	321	222
Turnovers	0	1
Time of possession	28:56	31:04

Team	Category	Player	Statistics
Central Washington	Passing	Justin Lane	19/37, 321 yards, 3 TD
Central Washington	Rushing	Quincy Carter	19 rushes, 81 yards, TD
Central Washington	Receiving	Jesse Zalk	9 receptions, 181 yards, 3 TD
Portland State	Passing	Alex Kuresa	16/26, 222 yards, 2 TD
Portland State	Rushing	Nate Tago	24 rushes, 136 yards, 3 TD
Portland State	Receiving	Maximo Espitia	5 receptions, 88 yards, TD

=== At San Jose State ===
	1	2	3	4	Total
No. 16 Vikings	7	7	7	14	35
Spartans	7	21	24	14	66

Statistics	PRST	SJSU
First downs	17	28
Total yards	458	642
Rushing yards	202	409
Passing yards	256	233
Turnovers	6	0
Time of possession	25:00	35:00

Team	Category	Player	Statistics
Portland State Vikings	Passing	Alex Kuresa	10/22, 135 yards, TD, 3 INT
Portland State Vikings	Rushing	Paris Penn	14 rushes, 137 yards, TD
Portland State Vikings	Receiving	Alex Kuresa	1 reception, 78 yards, TD
San Jose State	Passing	Kenny Potter	14/20, 233 yards, 3 TD
San Jose State	Rushing	Deontae Cooper	18 rushes, 126 yards, TD
San Jose State	Receiving	Tre Hartley	4 receptions, 93 yards, TD

=== At No. 8 (FBS) Washington ===
	1	2	3	4	Total
No. 19 Vikings	0	0	3	0	3
No. 8 (FBS) Huskies	14	14	0	13	41

Statistics	PRST	WASH
First downs	13	20
Total yards	182	407
Rushing yards	34	213
Passing yards	148	194
Turnovers	4	1
Time of possession	33:42	26:18

Team	Category	Player	Statistics
Portland State	Passing	Alex Kuresa	11/17, 148 yards, INT
Portland State	Rushing	Nate Tago	12 rushes, 20 yards
Portland State	Receiving	Maximo Espitia	4 receptions, 75 yards
Washington	Passing	Jake Browning	12/19, 163 yards, 4 TD
Washington	Rushing	Myles Gaskin	13 rushes, 93 yards, TD
Washington	Receiving	Chico McClatcher	4 receptions, 69 yards, 2 TD

=== At Southern Utah ===
	1	2	3	4	Total
No. 25 Vikings	3	7	14	7	31
Thunderbirds	7	24	7	7	45

Statistics	PRST	SUU
First downs	25	16
Total yards	509	541
Rushing yards	234	292
Passing yards	275	249
Turnovers	5	2
Time of possession	36:09	23:51

Team	Category	Player	Statistics
Portland State	Passing	Alex Kuresa	15/33, 264 yards, 2 TD, 4 INT
Portland State	Rushing	Alex Kuresa	18 rushes, 133 yards, TD
Portland State	Receiving	Maximo Espitia	7 receptions, 138 yards, TD
Southern Utah	Passing	Patrick Tyler	15/30, 249 yards, 2 TD, 2 INT
Southern Utah	Rushing	Malik Brown	15 rushes, 173 yards, TD
Southern Utah	Receiving	Mike Sharp	5 receptions, 139 yards, 2 TD

This matchup quickly became known for the controversial comments made by Coach Barnum leading up to the game when he said, referring to Cedar City, Utah (home of SUU), "I didn’t want to stay in Whoville. We are going to stay up in the Grinch's Castle. We are going to go down, play them Saturday, whoop up on them." SUU fans responded by setting a single-game attendance record, with many students carrying signs mocking Barnum's remarks.

=== Idaho State ===
	1	2	3	4	Total
Bengals	6	0	0	14	20
Vikings	14	17	7	7	45

Statistics	IDST	PRST
First downs	24	21
Total yards	370	531
Rushing yards	158	531
Passing yards	212	0
Turnovers	2	0
Time of possession	29:45	30:15

Team	Category	Player	Statistics
Idaho State	Passing	Tanner Gueller	22/39, 212 yards, 2 TD, INT
Idaho State	Rushing	Jakori Ford	18 rushes, 78 yards, TD
Idaho State	Receiving	K. W. Williams	10 receptions, 101 yards, 2 TD
Portland State	Passing	Alex Kuresa	0/5, 0 yards
Portland State	Rushing	Nate Tago	12 rushes, 199 yards, TD
Portland State	Receiving	None	

=== At Weber State ===
	1	2	3	4	Total
Vikings	0	7	0	3	10
Wildcats	0	0	7	7	14

Statistics	PRST	WEB
First downs	18	15
Total yards	317	271
Rushing yards	136	185
Passing yards	181	86
Turnovers	0	1
Time of possession	34:07	25:53

Team	Category	Player	Statistics
Portland State	Passing	Alex Kuresa	14/25, 181 yards
Portland State	Rushing	Nate Tago	12 rushes, 51 yards
Portland State	Receiving	Paris Penn	6 receptions, 65 yards
Weber State	Passing	Jadrian Clark	12/25, 86 yards, TD, INT
Weber State	Rushing	Jadrian Clark	7 rushes, 77 yards
Weber State	Receiving	Tui Satuala	1 reception, 29 yards

=== No. 19 Cal Poly ===
	1	2	3	4	Total
No. 19 Mustangs	13	14	14	14	55
Vikings	7	7	14	7	35

Statistics	CP	PRST
First downs	32	18
Total yards	658	347
Rushing yards	462	72
Passing yards	196	275
Turnovers	1	1
Time of possession	38:45	21:15

Team	Category	Player	Statistics
Cal Poly	Passing	Dano Graves	12/13, 166 yards, 3 TD
Cal Poly	Rushing	Kyle Lewis	11 rushes, 158 yards, 2 TD
Cal Poly	Receiving	Carson McMurtrey	2 receptions, 44 yards, TD
Portland State	Passing	Alex Kuresa	19/30, 275 yards, 2 TD, INT
Portland State	Rushing	Paris Penn	14 rushes, 68 yards
Portland State	Receiving	Josh Kraght	6 receptions, 83 yards

=== Northern Colorado ===
	1	2	3	4	OT	Total
Bears	3	10	29	7	7	56
Vikings	7	14	14	14	0	49

Statistics	UNCO	PRST
First downs	28	25
Total yards	558	549
Rushing yards	245	371
Passing yards	313	178
Turnovers	1	2
Time of possession	23:53	36:07

Team	Category	Player	Statistics
Northern Colorado	Passing	Kyle Sloter	20/31, 313 yards, 3 TD
Northern Colorado	Rushing	Trae Riek	12 rushes, 90 yards
Northern Colorado	Receiving	Stephen Miller	7 receptions, 143 yards
Portland State	Passing	Alex Kuresa	11/22, 178 yards, 2 TD, INT
Portland State	Rushing	Alex Kuresa	22 rushes, 130 yards, 2 TD
Portland State	Receiving	Josh Kraght	4 receptions, 100 yards

=== At UC Davis ===
	1	2	3	4	Total
Vikings	10	20	14	7	51
Aggies	6	10	0	13	29

Statistics	PRST	UCD
First downs	25	21
Total yards	602	408
Rushing yards	177	190
Passing yards	425	218
Turnovers	0	2
Time of possession	32:38	27:22

Team	Category	Player	Statistics
Portland State	Passing	Alex Kuresa	16/20, 384 yards, TD
Portland State	Rushing	Paris Penn	15 rushes, 53 yards, 2 TD
Portland State	Receiving	Austin Holman	3 receptions, 108 yards
UC Davis	Passing	Ben Scott	8/22, 118 yards, 2 TD, INT
UC Davis	Rushing	Joshua Kelley	10 rushes, 91 yards
UC Davis	Receiving	Keelan Doss	4 receptions, 91 yards, TD

=== At Sacramento State ===
	1	2	3	4	Total
Vikings	7	14	7	7	35
Hornets	7	14	14	7	42

Statistics	PRST	SAC
First downs	21	20
Total yards	522	519
Rushing yards	424	324
Passing yards	98	195
Turnovers	0	3
Time of possession	30:48	29:12

Team	Category	Player	Statistics
Portland State	Passing	Alex Kuresa	11/24, 98 yards, TD
Portland State	Rushing	Alex Kuresa	15 rushes, 198 yards, 2 TD
Portland State	Receiving	Josh Kraght	3 receptions, 35 yards, TD
Sacramento State	Passing	Nate Ketteringham	10/17, 195 yards, 2 INT
Sacramento State	Rushing	Jordan Robinson	23 rushes, 262 yards, 4 TD
Sacramento State	Receiving	Jaelen Ratliff	4 receptions, 103 yards

=== No. 3 Eastern Washington ===
	1	2	3	4	Total
No. 3 Eagles	7	0	14	14	35
Vikings	14	0	14	0	28

Statistics	EWU	PRST
First downs	22	26
Total yards	442	471
Rushing yards	138	213
Passing yards	304	258
Turnovers	1	1
Time of possession	25:15	34:45

Team	Category	Player	Statistics
Eastern Washington	Passing	Gage Gubrud	24/41, 304 yards, 3 TD, INT
Eastern Washington	Rushing	Antoine Custer Jr.	13 rushes, 69 yards
Eastern Washington	Receiving	Shaq Hill	7 receptions, 124 yards, TD
Portland State	Passing	Alex Kuresa	22/33, 252 yards, TD, INT
Portland State	Rushing	Alex Kuresa	13 rushes, 93 yards
Portland State	Receiving	Charlie Taumoepeau	2 receptions, 71 yards

== Ranking movements ==
Ranking movements Legend: ██ Increase in ranking ██ Decrease in ranking — = Not ranked RV = Received votes т = Tied with team above or below
	Week													
Poll	Pre	1	2	3	4	5	6	7	8	9	10	11	12	Final
STATS FCS	17	16	19	25	RV	RV	—	—	—	—	—	—	—	—
Coaches	12	14	17	25–T	RV	RV	—	—	—	—	—	—	—	—
