= 2016 Montana Grizzlies football team =

American college football season

2016 Montana Grizzlies football
- Conference: Big Sky Conference

Ranking
- FCS Coaches: No. 25
- Record: 6–5 (3–5 Big Sky)
- Head coach: Bob Stitt (2nd season)
- Defensive coordinator: Jason Semore (1st season)
- Home stadium: Washington–Grizzly Stadium

2016 Big Sky Conference football standings
	Conf.			Overall
Team	W		L	W		L
No. 4 Eastern Washington +^	8	–	0	12	–	2
No. 12 North Dakota +^	8	–	0	9	–	3
No. 25 Weber State ^	6	–	2	7	–	5
No. 24 Cal Poly ^	5	–	3	7	–	5
Southern Utah	5	–	3	6	–	5
Northern Colorado	4	–	4	6	–	5
Northern Arizona	4	–	4	5	–	6
Montana	3	–	5	6	–	5
Montana State	2	–	6	4	–	7
Portland State	2	–	6	3	–	8
UC Davis	2	–	6	3	–	8
Sacramento State	2	–	6	2	–	9
Idaho State	1	–	7	2	–	9
$ – Conference champion; ^ – FCS playoff participant; Rankings from STATS Poll

The 2016 Montana Grizzlies football team represented the University of Montana in the 2016 NCAA Division I FCS football season. The Grizzlies were led by second-year coach Bob Stitt and played their home games on campus at Washington–Grizzly Stadium. Montana participated as a member of the Big Sky Conference, of which they are a charter member. They finished the season 6–5, 3–5 in Big Sky play to finish in eighth place.

== Schedule ==
Date	Time	Opponent	Rank	Site	TV	Result	Attendance
September 3	7:00 pm	Saint Francis (PA)*	No. 13	Washington–Grizzly Stadium; Missoula, MT	SWX	W 41–31	26,002
September 10	3:00 pm	at No. 3 Northern Iowa*	No. 14	UNI-Dome; Cedar Falls, IA	ALT	W 20–14	12,346
September 24	2:00 pm	at Cal Poly	No. 6	Alex G. Spanos Stadium; San Luis Obispo, CA	RTNW	L 41–42	8,156
October 1	2:30 pm	Southern Utah^{†}	No. 11	Washington–Grizzly Stadium; Missoula, MT	CMM	W 43–20	26,092
October 8	2:30 pm	Mississippi Valley State*	No. 10	Washington–Grizzly Stadium; Missoula, MT	CMM	W 67–7	24,607
October 15	2:30 pm	Sacramento State	No. 10	Washington–Grizzly Stadium; Missoula, MT	CMM	W 68–7	25,351
October 22	5:00 pm	at Northern Arizona	No. 10	Walkup Skydome; Flagstaff, AZ	CMM	L 34–45	7,197
October 29	1:35 pm	at No. 3 Eastern Washington	No. 16	Roos Field; Cheney, WA (EWU–UM Governors Cup)	RTNW	L 16–35	10,931
November 5	5:00 pm	Idaho State	No. 19	Washington–Grizzly Stadium; Missoula, MT	RTNW	W 62–44	24,027
November 12	12:00 pm	at Northern Colorado	No. 18	Nottingham Field; Greeley, CO	CMM	L 25–28	5,128
November 19	12:00 pm	Montana State	No. 22	Washington–Grizzly Stadium; Missoula, MT (rivalry)	RTNW	L 17–24	26,182
*Non-conference game; ^{†}Homecoming; Rankings from STATS Poll released prior to the game; All times are in Mountain time

== Game summaries ==
Source for final score

=== Saint Francis (PA) ===
	1	2	3	4	Total
Red Flash	0	10	7	14	31
#13 Grizzlies	3	3	14	21	41

=== @ Northern Iowa ===
	1	2	3	4	Total
#14 Grizzlies	10	10	0	0	20
#3 Panthers	7	0	0	7	14

=== @ Cal Poly ===
	1	2	3	4	Total
#6 Grizzlies	7	17	7	10	41
Mustangs	7	21	7	7	42

=== Southern Utah ===
	1	2	3	4	Total
Thunderbirds	7	7	0	6	20
#11 Grizzlies	9	13	14	7	43

=== Mississippi Valley State ===
	1	2	3	4	Total
Delta Devils	7	0	0	0	7
#10 Grizzlies	14	29	14	10	67

=== Sacramento State ===
	1	2	3	4	Total
Hornets	0	0	0	7	7
#10 Grizzlies	14	27	20	7	68

=== @ Northern Arizona ===
	1	2	3	4	Total
#10 Grizzlies	3	17	0	14	34
Lumberjacks	14	14	17	0	45

=== @ Eastern Washington ===
	1	2	3	4	Total
#16 Grizzlies	7	3	6	0	16
#3 Eagles	7	14	14	0	35

=== Idaho State ===
	1	2	3	4	Total
Bengals	14	17	0	13	44
#19 Grizzlies	20	21	0	21	62

=== @ Northern Colorado ===
	1	2	3	4	Total
#18 Grizzlies	3	9	0	13	25
Bears	14	0	7	7	28

=== Montana State ===
	1	2	3	4	Total
Bobcats	7	7	10	0	24
#22 Grizzlies	7	0	3	7	17

== Ranking movements ==
Ranking movements Legend: ██ Increase in ranking ██ Decrease in ranking RV = Received votes
	Week													
Poll	Pre	1	2	3	4	5	6	7	8	9	10	11	12	Final
STATS FCS	13	14	7	6	11	10	10	10	16	19	18	22	RV	RV
Coaches	13	15	9	6	11	10	10	10	16	20	17	21	22	25
