= 2016 Southern Utah Thunderbirds football team =

American college football season

2016 Southern Utah Thunderbirds football
- Conference: Big Sky Conference
- Record: 6–5 (5–3 Big Sky)
- Head coach: Demario Warren (1st season)
- Offensive coordinator: Justin Walterscheid
- Co-defensive coordinators: Ryan Hunt (1st season); Solomona Tapasa (1st season)
- Home stadium: Eccles Coliseum

2016 Big Sky Conference football standings
	Conf.			Overall
Team	W		L	W		L
No. 4 Eastern Washington +^	8	–	0	12	–	2
No. 12 North Dakota +^	8	–	0	9	–	3
No. 25 Weber State ^	6	–	2	7	–	5
No. 24 Cal Poly ^	5	–	3	7	–	5
Southern Utah	5	–	3	6	–	5
Northern Colorado	4	–	4	6	–	5
Northern Arizona	4	–	4	5	–	6
Montana	3	–	5	6	–	5
Montana State	2	–	6	4	–	7
Portland State	2	–	6	3	–	8
UC Davis	2	–	6	3	–	8
Sacramento State	2	–	6	2	–	9
Idaho State	1	–	7	2	–	9
$ – Conference champion; ^ – FCS playoff participant; Rankings from STATS Poll

The 2016 Southern Utah Thunderbirds football team represented Southern Utah University in the 2016 NCAA Division I FCS football season. They were led by first-year head coach Demario Warren and played their home games at Eccles Coliseum. This was their fifth year as a member of the Big Sky Conference. They finished the season 6–5, 5–3 in Big Sky play to finish in a tie for fourth place.

== Schedule ==
Date	Time	Opponent	Site	TV	Result	Attendance
September 3	6:00 pm	at Utah*	Rice-Eccles Stadium; Salt Lake City, UT	P12N	L 0–24	45,945
September 10	6:00 pm	Southeastern Louisiana*	Eccles Coliseum; Cedar City, UT	WBS	W 28–23	7,010
September 24	6:00 pm	No. 25 Portland State^{†}	Eccles Coliseum; Cedar City, UT	WBS	W 45–31	10,306
October 1	2:30 pm	at No. 11 Montana	Washington–Grizzly Stadium; Missoula, MT	WBS	L 20–43	26,092
October 8	6:00 pm	UC Davis	Eccles Coliseum; Cedar City, UT	WBS	W 24–3	8,107
October 15	12:00 pm	at No. 22 North Dakota	Alerus Center; Grand Forks, ND	Midco SN	L 23–45	10,506
October 22	6:00 pm	Weber State	Eccles Coliseum; Cedar City, UT (Beehive Bowl)	WBS	L 36–37	8,511
October 29	2:35 pm	at Idaho State	Holt Arena; Pocatello, ID	Eversport.tv	W 52–27	4,667
November 5	12:00 pm	Montana State	Eccles Coliseum; Cedar City, UT	WBS	W 38–21	7,342
November 12	1:00 pm	at BYU*	LaVell Edwards Stadium; Provo, UT	BYUtv	L 7–37	59,302
November 19	3:00 pm	at Northern Arizona	Walkup Skydome; Flagstaff, AZ (Grand Canyon Rivalry)	NAU-TV, FSAZ	W 48–21	5,626
*Non-conference game; ^{†}Homecoming; Rankings from STATS Poll released prior to the game; All times are in Mountain time

== Game summaries ==
=== At Utah ===
Southern Utah at Utah

Team	1	2	3	4	Total
Thunderbirds	0	0	0	0	0
• Utes	3	14	0	7	24

- Date: September 1
- Location: Rice-Eccles Stadium
  Salt Lake City, UT
- Game start: 6:07 MDT
- Elapsed time: 3:06
- Game attendance: 45,945
- Game weather: 80 °F (27 °C), Partly cloudy, winds S 11 mph
- Referee: Land Clark • Umpire: Matt Jordan • Linesman: Bob Day • Line judge: Jeff Robinson • Back judge: Justin Nelson • Field judge: John Morton • Side judge: Bernie Hulscher • Center judge: John Love
- TV announcers (P12): Roxy Bernstein, Anthony Herron, Lewis Johnson

Scoring summary

Quarter	Time	Drive			Team	Scoring information	Score	
Quarter	Time	Plays	Yards	TOP	Team	Scoring information	SUU	Utah
1	10:38	9	67	4:22	Utah	26-yard field goal by Andy Phillips	0	3
2	3:41	9	53	4:49	Utah	Troy McCormick 4-yard touchdown run, Andy Phillips kick good	0	10
2	1:11	4	37	1:00	Utah	Tim Patrick 2-yard touchdown reception from Troy Williams, Andy Phillips kick good	0	17
4	9:27	2	57	0:37	Utah	Tim Patrick 57-yard touchdown reception from Troy Williams, Andy Phillips kick good	0	24
"TOP" = time of possession. For other American football terms, see Glossary of American football.							0	24

Game Stats:

- Passing: SUU: McCoy Hill 6-12-0--42, Tannon Pedersen 0-6-1--0; Utah: Troy Williams 20-35-0--272, Tyler Huntley 3-4-0--26.
- Rushing: SUU: Malik Brown 10-49, Ty Rutledge 1-33, Hill 8-26, Raysean Pringle 5-13, James Felila 3-9, Isaiah Diego-Wi 1-0, Pedersen 4-(-14); Utah: Troy McCormick 12-55, Joe Williams 12-49, Armand Shyne 8-19, T. Williams 5-15.
- Receiving: SUU: Mike Sharp 1-14, Steven Wroblews 1-12, Rutledge 1-9, Logan Parker 1-6, Felila 1-4, Pringle 1-(-3); Utah: Tim Patrick 5-105, Rae Singleton 2-56, Troy McCormick 3-55, Tyrone Smith 3-31, Evan Moeai 1-18, Walla Gonzales 1-11, Demari Simpkins 1-8, Siaosi Wilkins 1-8, Terrell Burgess 1-7, Kyle Fulks 2-1, Joe Williams 3-(-2)
- Interceptions: Utah: Marcus Williams 1-0.

=== Southeastern Louisiana ===
Southeastern Louisiana at Southern Utah

Team	1	2	3	4	Total
Lions	10	7	0	6	23
• Thunderbirds	7	7	7	7	28

- Date: September 10
- Location: Eccles Coliseum
  Cedar City, UT
- Game start: 6:00 MDT
- Elapsed time: 3:10
- Game attendance: 7,010
- Game weather: 75 °F (24 °C), Sunny
- TV announcers (Watch Big Sky): Art Challis, Devin Dixon

Scoring summary

Quarter	Time	Drive			Team	Scoring information	Score	
Quarter	Time	Plays	Yards	TOP	Team	Scoring information	SLU	SUU
1	12:51	5	75	2:09	SLU	Brandon Acker 19-yard touchdown reception from Justin Alo, Jonathan Tatum kick good	7	0
1	9:45	10	60	3:06	SUU	Brady Measom 6-yard touchdown reception from Patrick Tyler, Keita Calhoun kick good	7	7
1	0:45	8	40	2:21	SLU	24-yard field goal by Jonathan Tatum	10	7
2	12:14	4	69	1:47	SLU	Rasheed Harrell 5-yard touchdown run, Jonathan Tatum kick good	17	7
2	8:33	11	87	3:41	SUU	Ty Rutledge 3-yard touchdown run, Keita Calhoun kick good	17	14
3	7:57	7	53	2:15	SUU	Brady Measom 10-yard touchdown reception from Patrick Tyler, Keita Calhoun kick good	17	21
4	9:27	9	69	2:39	SUU	Mike Sharp 16-yard touchdown reception from Patrick Tyler, Keita Calhoun kick good	17	28
4	3:33	12	75	5:54	SLU	Juwan Dickey 20-yard touchdown reception from Justin Alo, 2-point pass failed	23	28
"TOP" = time of possession. For other American football terms, see Glossary of American football.							23	28

Game Stats:

- Passing: SLU: Justin Alo 18-31-2--275; SUU: Patrick Tyler 18-28-0--188, Mike Sharp 1-1-0--34, Ty Rutledge 0-1-0--0.
- Rushing: SLU: Kaelyn Henderson 5-46, Julius Maracalin 6-40, Rasheed Harrell 7-36, Alo 7-13, Darius Durall 7-13, Jake Ingarfia 1-(-2), Micah Thomas 1-(-3) ; SUU: Malik Brown 32-146, Raysean Pringle 6-30, James Felia 4-17, Tate Lewis 1-10, Tyler 6-8, Rutledge 3-6, Team 2-(-2).
- Receiving: SLU: Brandon Acker 8-146, Juwan Dickey 5-88, Juwaan Rogers 3-39, Joe Pack 1-4, Javon Conner 1-(-2); SUU: Brady Measom 6-58, Mike Sharp 4-64, Steven Wroblews 4-59, Logan Parker 2-23, Desean Holmes 2014, Rutledge 1-4.
- Interceptions: SUU: Mike Needham 1-4, Tyler Collett 1-0.

=== Portland State ===
	1	2	3	4	Total
#25 Vikings	3	7	14	7	31
Thunderbirds	7	24	7	7	45

=== At Montana ===
	1	2	3	4	Total
Thunderbirds	7	7	0	6	20
#11 Grizzlies	9	13	14	7	43

=== UC Davis ===
	1	2	3	4	Total
Aggies	0	3	0	0	3
Thunderbirds	0	21	3	0	24

=== At North Dakota ===
	1	2	3	4	Total
Thunderbirds	14	3	6	0	23
#22 Fighting Hawks	7	21	3	14	45

=== Weber State ===
	1	2	3	4	Total
Wildcats	0	6	8	23	37
Thunderbirds	14	9	13	0	36

=== At Idaho State ===
	1	2	3	4	Total
Thunderbirds	7	10	21	14	52
Bengals	7	6	7	7	27

=== Montana State ===
	1	2	3	4	Total
Bobcats	7	7	0	7	21
Thunderbirds	0	14	10	14	38

=== At BYU ===
	1	2	3	4	Total
Thunderbirds	0	7	0	0	7
Cougars	14	17	0	6	37

=== At Northern Arizona ===
	1	2	3	4	Total
Thunderbirds	14	14	20	0	48
Lumberjacks	14	7	0	0	21

== Ranking movements ==
Ranking movements Legend: ██ Increase in ranking ██ Decrease in ranking — = Not ranked RV = Received votes
	Week													
Poll	Pre	1	2	3	4	5	6	7	8	9	10	11	12	Final
STATS FCS	RV	RV	RV	RV	RV	RV	RV	RV	—	—	—	RV		
Coaches	23	23	21	RV	24	RV	RV	RV	—	—	—	RV		
