= 2016 Eastern Washington Eagles football team =

American college football season

2016 Eastern Washington Eagles football

Big Sky co-champion

FCS Playoffs Semifinals, L 38–40 vs. Youngstown State
- Conference: Big Sky Conference

Ranking
- STATS: No. 4
- FCS Coaches: No. 4
- Record: 12–2 (8–0 Big Sky)
- Head coach: Beau Baldwin (9th season)
- Offensive coordinator: Aaron Best (9th season)
- Co-offensive coordinator: Troy Taylor (1st season)
- Offensive scheme: Multiple
- Defensive coordinator: Jeff Schmedding (2nd season)
- Base defense: 4–2–5
- Home stadium: Roos Field

2016 Big Sky Conference football standings
	Conf.			Overall
Team	W		L	W		L
No. 4 Eastern Washington +^	8	–	0	12	–	2
No. 12 North Dakota +^	8	–	0	9	–	3
No. 25 Weber State ^	6	–	2	7	–	5
No. 24 Cal Poly ^	5	–	3	7	–	5
Southern Utah	5	–	3	6	–	5
Northern Colorado	4	–	4	6	–	5
Northern Arizona	4	–	4	5	–	6
Montana	3	–	5	6	–	5
Montana State	2	–	6	4	–	7
Portland State	2	–	6	3	–	8
UC Davis	2	–	6	3	–	8
Sacramento State	2	–	6	2	–	9
Idaho State	1	–	7	2	–	9
$ – Conference champion; ^ – FCS playoff participant; Rankings from STATS Poll

The 2016 Eastern Washington Eagles football team represented Eastern Washington University in the 2016 NCAA Division I FCS football season. They were led by head coach Beau Baldwin, who was in his ninth season with Eastern Washington. The Eagles played their home games at Roos Field in Cheney, Washington and were a member of the Big Sky Conference. They finished the season 12–2, 8–0 in Big Sky play to share the conference championship with North Dakota. They received the automatic bid into the FCS Playoffs where they defeated Central Arkansas and Richmond in the second round and quarterfinals, before losing to Youngstown State in the semifinals.

On January 16, 2017, head coach Beau Baldwin resigned to become the offensive coordinator at California. He finished at Eastern Washington with a nine year record of 85–32.

== Preseason ==
=== Big Sky polls ===
On July 19, 2016, the Big Sky Conference released its preseason coaches' and media polls. The Wildcats were predicted to finish fourth in the coaches' poll and third in the media poll.

Coaches' poll
Predicted finish	Team	Votes (1st place)
1	Northern Arizona	132 (8)
2	Portland State	121 (2)
2	Montana	121
4	Eastern Washington	112 (2)
5	North Dakota	105 (1)
6	Weber State	83
7	Southern Utah	73
7	Montana State	73
9	Cal Poly	66
10	Northern Colorado	43
11	Sacramento State	30
12	Idaho State	24
13	UC Davis	23

Media poll
Predicted finish	Team	Votes (1st place)
1	Northern Arizona	287 (8)
2	Montana	283 (7)
3	Eastern Washington	269 (5)
4	North Dakota	262 (2)
5	Portland State	252 (3)
6	Weber State	174
7	Southern Utah	162
8	Montana State	157
9	Cal Poly	153
10	Northern Colorado	111
11	Idaho State	58
12	UC Davis	56
13	Sacramento State	50

== Schedule ==
Date	Time	Opponent	Rank	Site	TV	Result	Attendance
September 3	5:00 pm	at Washington State*	No. 14	Martin Stadium; Pullman, WA	P12N	W 45–42	32,952
September 10	12:30 pm	at No. 1 North Dakota State*	No. 8	Fargodome; Fargo, ND	SWX	L 44–50 ^{OT}	18,906
September 17	4:05 pm	No. 10 Northern Iowa*	No. 8	Roos Field; Cheney, WA	SWX	W 34–30	9,111
September 24	4:05 pm	at Northern Arizona	No. 4	Walkup Skydome; Flagstaff, AZ	SWX	W 50–35	10,179
October 1	1:05 pm	UC Davis	No. 4	Roos Field; Cheney, WA	RTNW	W 63–30	10,741
October 8	1:05 pm	Northern Colorado^{†}	No. 4	Roos Field; Cheney, WA	SWX	W 49–31	10,924
October 22	11:05 am	at Montana State	No. 3	Bobcat Stadium; Bozeman, MT	RTNW	W 41–17	18,087
October 29	12:35 pm	No. 16 Montana	No. 3	Roos Field; Cheney, WA (EWU–UM Governors Cup)	RTNW	W 35–16	10,931
November 5	6:05 pm	at No. 14 Cal Poly	No. 3	Alex G. Spanos Stadium; San Luis Obispo, CA	WBS	W 42–21	9,722
November 12	3:35 pm	Idaho State	No. 3	Roos Field; Cheney, WA	SWX	W 48–17	9,302
November 18	7:35 pm	at Portland State	No. 3	Providence Park; Portland, OR (The Dam Cup)	RTNW	W 35–28	5,669
December 3	1:00 pm	No. 14 Central Arkansas*	No. 3	Roos Field; Cheney, WA (NCAA Division I Second Round)	ESPN3	W 31–14	6,085
December 10	1:00 pm	No. 12 Richmond*	No. 3	Roos Field; Cheney, WA (NCAA Division I Quarterfinal)	ESPN3	W 38–0	5,150
December 17	3:30 pm	No. 13 Youngstown State*	No. 3	Roos Field; Cheney, WA (NCAA Division I Semifinal)	ESPNU	L 38–40	5,233
*Non-conference game; ^{†}Homecoming; Rankings from STATS Poll released prior to the game; All times are in Pacific time

== Roster ==
2016 Eastern Washington Eagles football team roster
Players
Coaches
Offense

Pos.	#	Name	Class
QB	8	Gage Gubrud	So
QB	12	Reilly Hennessey	So
RB	28	Antoine Custer Jr.	Fr
RB	30	Tamarick Pierce	Fr
RB	2	Jabari Wilson	Sr
WR	10	Cooper Kupp	Sr
WR	11	Kendrick Bourne	Sr
WR	1	Shaq Hill	Sr
WR	7	Nic Sblendorio	Jr
WR	81	Stu Stiles	So
TE	9	Zach Wimberly	Sr

Defense

Pos.	#	Name	Class
DL	3	Samson Ebukam	Sr
DB	32	Zach Bruce	Sr

Special teams

Pos.	#	Name	Class

Head coach

- Beau Baldwin

Coordinators/assistant coaches

Legend

- (C) Team captain
- (S) Suspended
- (I) Ineligible
- Injured
- Redshirt

Roster

== Game summaries ==
=== At Washington State ===
	1	2	3	4	Total
No. 14 Eagles	7	17	14	7	45
Cougars	14	14	0	14	42

=== At No. 1 North Dakota State ===
	1	2	3	4	OT	Total
No. 8 Eagles	0	14	10	20	0	44
No. 1 Bison	7	14	7	16	6	50

=== No. 10 Northern Iowa ===
	1	2	3	4	Total
No. 10 Panthers	10	14	0	6	30
No. 8 Eagles	0	7	14	13	34

=== At Northern Arizona ===
	1	2	3	4	Total
No. 4 Eagles	12	10	14	14	50
Lumberjacks	7	14	7	7	35

=== UC Davis ===
	1	2	3	4	Total
Aggies	0	23	7	0	30
No. 4 Eagles	14	0	35	14	63

=== Northern Colorado ===
	1	2	3	4	Total
Bears	7	10	7	7	31
No. 4 Eagles	3	11	21	14	49

=== At Montana State ===
	1	2	3	4	Total
No. 3 Eagles	14	10	7	10	41
Bobcats	14	3	0	0	17

=== No. 16 Montana ===
	1	2	3	4	Total
No. 16 Grizzlies	7	3	6	0	16
No. 3 Eagles	7	14	14	0	35

=== At No. 14 Cal Poly ===
	1	2	3	4	Total
No. 3 Eagles	14	7	14	7	42
No. 14 Mustangs	7	7	7	0	21

=== Idaho State ===
	1	2	3	4	Total
Bengals	3	7	7	0	17
No. 3 Eagles	7	13	14	14	48

=== At Portland State ===
	1	2	3	4	Total
No. 3 Eagles	7	0	14	14	35
Vikings	14	0	14	0	28

== FCS playoffs ==
=== No. 14 Central Arkansas (Second Round) ===
	1	2	3	4	Total
No. 14 Bears	0	14	0	0	14
No. 3 Eagles	0	21	3	7	31

=== No. 12 Richmond (Quarterfinals) ===
	1	2	3	4	Total
No. 12 Spiders	0	0	0	0	0
No. 3 Eagles	7	14	10	7	38

=== No. 13 Youngstown State (Semifinals) ===
	1	2	3	4	Total
No. 13 Penguins	7	10	3	20	40
No. 3 Eagles	10	14	7	7	38

== Ranking movements ==
Ranking movements Legend: ██ Increase in ranking ██ Decrease in ranking ( ) = First-place votes
	Week													
Poll	Pre	1	2	3	4	5	6	7	8	9	10	11	12	Final
STATS	14	8 (1)	8	4	4	4	4	3 (17)	3 (18)	3 (18)	3 (19)	3 (21)	3 (14)	4
Coaches	17	8	7	5	5	5	5	3 (1)	3 (1)	3 (1)	3 (1)	3 (1)	4 (1)	4
FCS Playoffs	Not released									3	2	2	Not released	
