= Demario Warren =

American football player and coach (born 1985)

Current position
- Title: Cornerbacks coach
- Team: BYU
- Conference: Big 12

Biographical details
- Born: April 20, 1985 (age 41); Fairfield, California, U.S.
- Education: University of California, Davis, B.S. (2008); University of Phoenix, M.B.A (2010)

Playing career
- 2005–2007: UC Davis
- Position: Running back

Coaching career (HC unless noted)
- 2008–2013: Southern Utah (DB)
- 2014–2015: Southern Utah (DC)
- 2016–2021: Southern Utah
- 2022: Boise State (CB)
- 2023: Boise State (CB/STC)
- 2024–2025: Boise State (CB)
- 2026–present: BYU (Safeties)

Head coaching record
- Overall: 21–42
- Tournaments: 0–1 (NCAA D-I playoffs)

Accomplishments and honors

Championships
- 1 Big Sky (2017)

Demario Odell Warren (born April 20, 1985) is an American football coach and former player. He is the safeties coach at Brigham Young University. From 2022-25, Demario served as the cornerbacks coach and special teams coach for Boise State University. He served as the head football coach at Southern Utah University from 2016 to 2021, winning the Big Sky conference championship in 2017 and compiling an overall record of 21–42. Warren accepted the head coaching position at SUU on January 11, 2016, after serving as the team's defensive coordinator for two years.

== Head coaching record ==
Year	Team	Overall	Conference	Standing	Bowl/playoffs	STATS^{#}	Coaches^{°}
Southern Utah Thunderbirds (Big Sky Conference) (2016–2021)
2016	Southern Utah	6–5	5–3	T–4th			
2017	Southern Utah	9–3	7–1	T–1st	L NCAA Division I Second Round	14	13
2018	Southern Utah	1–10	1–7	12th			
2019	Southern Utah	3–9	2–6	T–9th			
2020–21	Southern Utah	1–5	1–5	7th			
2021	Southern Utah	1–10	0–8	13th			
Southern Utah:		21–42	16–30				
Total:		21–42					
National championship Conference title Conference division title or championship game berth
