= 2016 Weber State Wildcats football team =

American college football season

2016 Weber State Wildcats football

FCS Playoffs First Round, L 14–45 vs. Chattanooga
- Conference: Big Sky Conference

Ranking
- STATS: No. 25
- FCS Coaches: No. 24
- Record: 7–5 (6–2 Big Sky)
- Head coach: Jay Hill (3rd season)
- Offensive coordinator: Fesi Sitake (1st season)
- Defensive coordinator: Jason Kaufusi (1st season)
- Home stadium: Stewart Stadium

2016 Big Sky Conference football standings
	Conf.			Overall
Team	W		L	W		L
No. 4 Eastern Washington +^	8	–	0	12	–	2
No. 12 North Dakota +^	8	–	0	9	–	3
No. 25 Weber State ^	6	–	2	7	–	5
No. 24 Cal Poly ^	5	–	3	7	–	5
Southern Utah	5	–	3	6	–	5
Northern Colorado	4	–	4	6	–	5
Northern Arizona	4	–	4	5	–	6
Montana	3	–	5	6	–	5
Montana State	2	–	6	4	–	7
Portland State	2	–	6	3	–	8
UC Davis	2	–	6	3	–	8
Sacramento State	2	–	6	2	–	9
Idaho State	1	–	7	2	–	9
$ – Conference champion; ^ – FCS playoff participant; Rankings from STATS Poll

The 2016 Weber State Wildcats football team represented Weber State University in the 2016 NCAA Division I FCS football season. The Wildcats were led by third year head coach Jay Hill and played their games at Stewart Stadium and were members of the Big Sky Conference. They finished the season 7–5, 6–2 in Big Sky play to finish in third place.

The Wildcats received an at-large bid to the FCS Playoffs where they lost to Chattanooga in the first round.

== Schedule ==
Date	Time	Opponent	Rank	Site	TV	Result	Attendance
September 1	6:00 pm	at Utah State*		Maverik Stadium; Logan, UT	CI/Twitter	L 6–45	23,008
September 10	1:00 pm	at South Dakota*		DakotaDome; Vermillion, SD	ESPN3	L 49–52 ^{2OT}	8,114
September 17	6:00 pm	Sacramento State*		Stewart Stadium; Ogden, UT	KJZZ	W 14–7	9,746
September 24	7:00 pm	at UC Davis		Aggie Stadium; Davis, CA	WBS	W 38–35	8,426
October 8	6:00 pm	Portland State^{†}		Stewart Stadium; Ogden, UT	KJZZ	W 14–10	10,217
October 15	1:30 pm	Montana State		Stewart Stadium; Ogden, UT	RTRM	W 45–27	7,148
October 22	6:00 pm	at Southern Utah		Eccles Coliseum; Cedar City, UT (Beehive Bowl)	WBS	W 37–36	8,511
October 29	12:00 pm	at No. 17 North Dakota		Alerus Center; Grand Forks, ND	Midco SN2	L 19–27	8,699
November 5	12:00 pm	Northern Arizona		Stewart Stadium; Ogden, UT	KJZZ	L 20–33	8,740
November 12	12:00 pm	No. 16 Cal Poly		Stewart Stadium; Ogden, UT	KJZZ	W 22–15	7,821
November 19	2:30 pm	at Idaho State		Holt Arena; Pocatello, ID	Eversport.tv	W 34–28	5,464
November 26	12:00 pm	at No. 11 Chattanooga*	No. 25	Finley Stadium; Chattanooga, TN (First Round)	ESPN3	L 14–45	5,238
*Non-conference game; ^{†}Homecoming; Rankings from STATS Poll released prior to the game; All times are in Mountain time

Despite also being a member of the Big Sky Conference, the game with Sacramento State on September 17 is considered a non-conference game.

== Game summaries ==
=== At Utah State ===
	1	2	3	4	Total
Wildcats	0	6	0	0	6
Aggies	14	7	10	14	45

=== At South Dakota ===
	1	2	3	4	OT	2OT	Total
Wildcats	28	0	14	0	7	0	49
Coyotes	14	7	0	21	7	3	52

=== Sacramento State ===
	1	2	3	4	Total
Hornets	0	7	0	0	7
Wildcats	0	7	0	7	14

=== At UC Davis ===
	1	2	3	4	Total
Wildcats	8	17	7	6	38
Aggies	10	0	3	22	35

=== Portland State ===
	1	2	3	4	Total
Vikings	0	7	0	3	10
Wildcats	0	0	7	7	14

=== Montana State ===
	1	2	3	4	Total
Bobcats	7	7	7	6	27
Wildcats	21	21	0	3	45

=== At Southern Utah ===
	1	2	3	4	Total
Wildcats	0	6	8	23	37
Thunderbirds	14	9	13	0	36

=== At North Dakota ===
	1	2	3	4	Total
Wildcats	0	13	0	6	19
#17 Fighting Hawks	7	0	14	6	27

=== Northern Arizona ===
	1	2	3	4	Total
Lumberjacks	10	10	3	10	33
Wildcats	0	7	7	6	20

=== Cal Poly ===
	1	2	3	4	Total
#16 Mustangs	0	7	8	0	15
Wildcats	12	3	0	7	22

=== At Idaho State ===
	1	2	3	4	Total
Wildcats	14	3	7	10	34
Bengals	7	14	0	7	28

== FCS Playoffs ==
=== First Round–Chattanooga ===
	1	2	3	4	Total
#25 Wildcats	0	0	7	7	14
#11 Mocs	14	10	7	14	45

== Ranking movements ==
Ranking movements Legend: ██ Increase in ranking ██ Decrease in ranking — = Not ranked RV = Received votes
	Week													
Poll	Pre	1	2	3	4	5	6	7	8	9	10	11	12	Final
STATS FCS	RV	RV	RV	—	—	—	RV	RV	RV	RV	RV	RV	25	25
Coaches	RV	RV	—	—	—	—	—	RV	RV	RV	RV	RV	23	24
