= Jay Hill (American football) =

American football player and coach (born 1975)

Current position
- Title: Defensive coordinator
- Team: Michigan
- Conference: Big Ten

Biographical details
- Born: March 16, 1975 (age 51); Lehi, Utah, U.S.

Playing career
- 1996–1997: Ricks
- 1998–1999: Utah
- Position: Cornerback

Coaching career (HC unless noted)
- 2001–2003: Utah (GA)
- 2004: Utah (AA)
- 2005–2006: Utah (CB/co-STC)
- 2007–2009: Utah (TE/STC)
- 2010–2011: Utah (CB/STC)
- 2012: Utah (RB/STC)
- 2013: Utah (TE/STC)
- 2014–2022: Weber State
- 2023–2025: BYU (DC/AHC/S)
- 2026–present: Michigan (DC)

Head coaching record
- Overall: 68–39
- Tournaments: 6–6 (NCAA D-I playoffs)

Accomplishments and honors

Championships
- 4 Big Sky (2017–2020)

Awards
- NJCAA All-American (1997); Second-team All-Mountain West (1999); Big Sky Coach of the Year (2020)

Jay Leroy Hill (born March 16, 1975) is an American college football coach, currently the defensive coordinator at the University of Michigan. He was previously the defensive coordinator and associate head coach at Brigham Young University (BYU) from 2023 to 2025. Prior to BYU, Hill served as the head football coach at Weber State University from 2014 to 2022, leaving as the program's all-time winningest head coach. He played football as a cornerback at the University of Utah from 1998 to 1999, and was an assistant coach for Utah from 2001 to 2013.

== Early life and playing career ==
Hill was born in Lehi, Utah in 1975. He played college football as a cornerback for Ricks College in 1996 and 1997, before transferring to play for Utah in 1998 and 1999. He was an NJCAA All-American at Ricks in 1997, and a second-team All-Mountain West selection in 1999 with Utah. As a senior, he led the Mountain West Conference in interceptions and was the Utah Utes Defensive MVP. In 2000, Hill signed contracts with the Buffalo Bills and New York Giants of the NFL, before briefly playing in the XFL in 2001.

== Coaching career ==
=== Utah ===
Hill began his coaching career at the University of Utah in 2001 as a graduate assistant under Ron McBride. In 2004 he was an administrative assistant under Urban Meyer. In 2005, Kyle Whittingham was hired as head coach and Hill was promoted to special teams coordinator, where he remained until 2013. He also coached the tight ends, cornerbacks and running backs separately from 2005 to 2013. As a cornerbacks coach, he mentored NFL draft picks Sean Smith, Brice McCain, R. J. Stanford, Brandon Burton and Eric Weddle.

=== Weber State ===
In 2014, Hill was hired as the head football coach at Weber State University, where Ron McBride had coached from 2005 to 2011. He left as the program's all-time winningest head coach in 2022, compiling a 68–39 record in nine seasons. Hill had eight straight winning seasons, four consecutive Big Sky Conference titles from 2017 to 2020, six FCS playoff appearances, and was the Big Sky Coach of the Year in 2020. He also helped 16 players earn All-American honors, including Taron Johnson and Rashid Shaheed.

=== BYU ===
Hill was hired as the defensive coordinator, associate head coach, and safeties coach at Brigham Young University by Kalani Sitake; remaining in the same role from 2023 until 2025. In his first season, the Cougars ranked 109th in total defense (yards per game) and 99th in scoring defense (points per game). In 2024 the team improved to 13th in total and 18th in scoring, and were 35th in total and 22nd in scoring in 2025. The 2024 and 2025 BYU Cougars had a combined 23–4 record.

=== Michigan ===
In January 2026, Hill was hired as the defensive coordinator by the University of Michigan, reuniting with first-year Wolverines head coach Kyle Whittingham.

== Personal life ==
Hill is married to the former Sara Kern. They have four children: Ashtyn, Alayna, Allie and Jacob. He attended the University of Utah, earning both a bachelor's degree in Spanish in 2000 and a master's degree in ESS/Sports Psychology in 2005. Hill is a member of the Church of Jesus Christ of Latter-day Saints.

== Head coaching record ==
Year	Team	Overall	Conference	Standing	Bowl/playoffs	STATS^{#}	Coaches^{°}
Weber State Wildcats (Big Sky Conference) (2014–2022)
2014	Weber State	2–10	2–6	T–10th			
2015	Weber State	6–5	5–3	T–4th			
2016	Weber State	7–5	6–2	3rd	L NCAA Division I First Round	25	24
2017	Weber State	11–3	7–1	T–1st	L NCAA Division I Quarterfinal	5	5
2018	Weber State	10–3	7–1	T–1st	L NCAA Division I Quarterfinal	6	6
2019	Weber State	11–4	7–1	T–1st	L NCAA Division I Semifinal	3	3
2020–21	Weber State	5–1	5–0	1st	L NCAA Division I First Round	3	3
2021	Weber State	6–5	5–3	T–5th			
2022	Weber State	10–3	6–2	T–3rd	L NCAA Division I Second Round	9	9
Weber State:		68–39	50–19				
Total:		68–39					
National championship Conference title Conference division title or championship game berth
