= Ron Gould (American football) =

American football player and coach (born 1965)

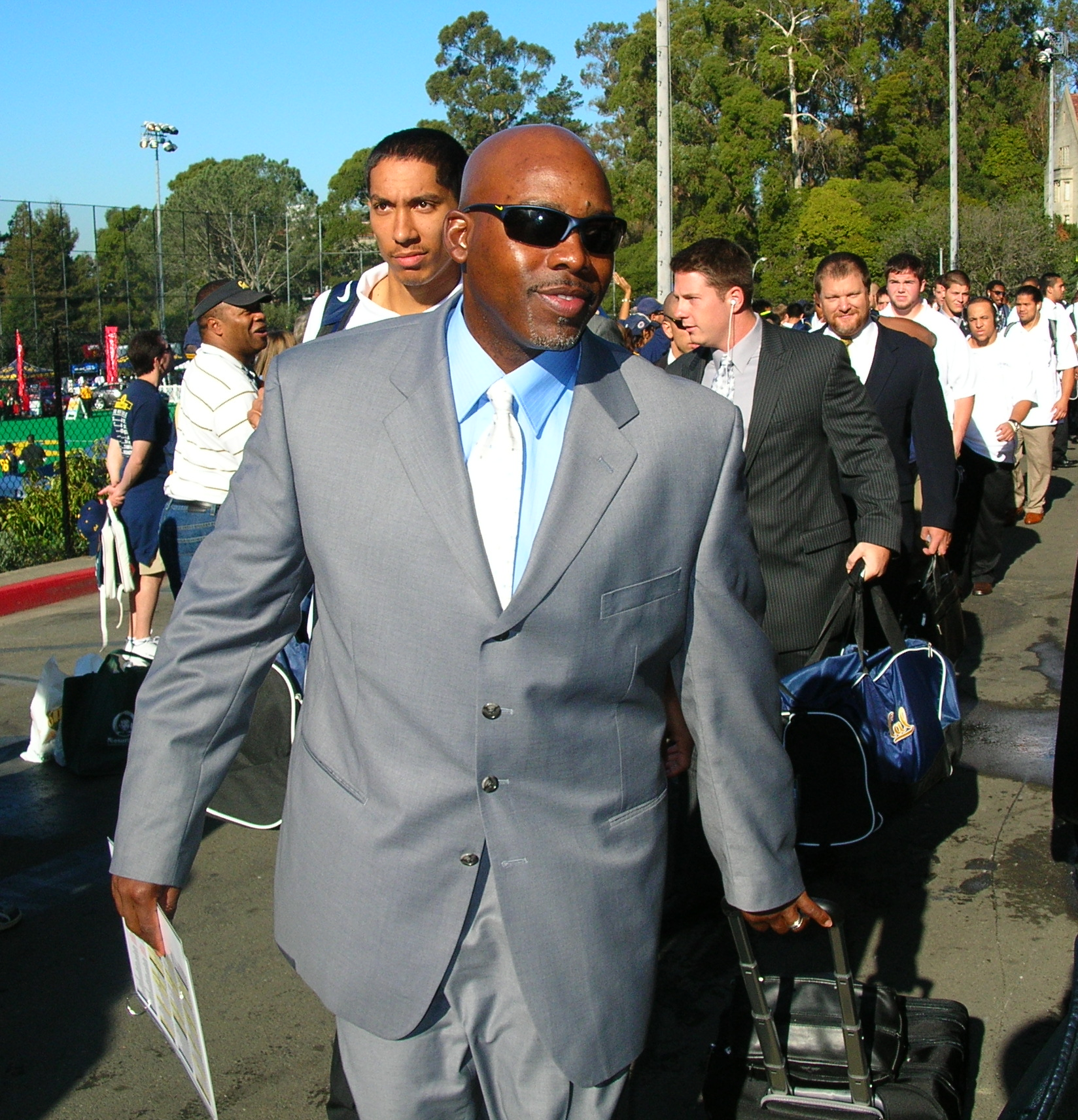
- Gould in 2008

Los Angeles Rams
- Title: Running backs coach

Personal information
- Born: September 15, 1965 (age 61); Tucson, Arizona, U.S.

Career information
- Position: Defensive back
- College: Scottsdale CC (1984–1985); Wichita State (1986); Oregon (1987)
- NFL draft: 1988: undrafted

Career history
- Oregon (1990–1991) Graduate assistant; Portland State (1992) Defensive backs coach; Boise State (1993–1996) Defensive backs coach; California (1997–2012) Running backs coach (1997–2007) Associate head coach, running backs (2008–2010) Associate head coach, run game coordinator (2011–2012); UC Davis (2013–2016) Head coach; Stanford (2017–2022) Running backs coach; Los Angeles Rams (2023–present) Running backs coach

Head coaching record
- Career: 12-33

Ronald Henry Gould (born September 15, 1965) is an American football coach and former player who is the running backs coach for the Los Angeles Rams of the National Football League (NFL). Prior to this, he was the running backs coach for the Stanford Cardinal football team from 2017 until 2022. He was head coach at the University of California, Davis (UC Davis) from 2013 to 2016. Gould was previously an associate head coach at the University of California, Berkeley. He spent sixteen seasons there, from 1997 to 2012 under head coaches Tom Holmoe and Jeff Tedford.

== Playing career ==
=== College ===
Gould played as a defensive back for Scottsdale CC from 1984 to 1985, and won a scholarship to Wichita where he played for Wichita State Shockers in 1986. When the Shockers discontinued their football program, he chose to play for Oregon Ducks in 1987 and graduated with a bachelor's degree in human services from the University of Oregon.

== Coaching career ==
=== Early career ===
Gould's coaching career began at Oregon as a graduate assistant coach in 1990–1991. He then served as defensive backs coach for the Portland State Vikings in 1992 and for Boise State Broncos in 1993–1996.

=== University of California, Berkeley ===
From 1997, Gould coached running backs for California. He became associate head coach in 2008 and was also run game coordinator from 2011 to 2012.

=== University of California, Davis ===
On December 17, 2012, Gould was named the football head coach at UC Davis. He was released early from his five-year contract on November 21, 2016 following a disappointing season.

=== Stanford ===
Gould became running backs coach for the Stanford Cardinal in 2017 and served there for six seasons until 2022. During this time he coached Bryce Love.

=== Los Angeles Rams ===
On March 4, 2023, Gould was hired to serve as the running backs coach for the Los Angeles Rams.

== Head coaching record ==
Year	Team	Overall	Conference	Standing	Bowl/playoffs
UC Davis Aggies (Big Sky Conference) (2013–2016)
2013	UC Davis	5–7	5–3	T–4th	
2014	UC Davis	2–9	1–7	13th	
2015	UC Davis	2–9	2–6	11th	
2016	UC Davis	3–8	2–6	T–9th	
UC Davis:		12–33	10–22		
Total:		12–33			
