= Jeff Choate =

American football player and coach (born 1970)

Current position
- Title: Head coach
- Team: Nevada
- Conference: MW
- Record: 11–25

Biographical details
- Born: July 15, 1970 (age 56); Columbus, Ohio, U.S.
- Education: Montana Western (B.S., 1993)

Playing career
- 1988–1991: Montana Western
- Position: Linebacker

Coaching career (HC unless noted)
- 1992–1993: Montana Western (LB)
- 1994–1995: Challis HS (ID)
- 1996: Twin Falls HS (ID) (DC)
- 1997–2001: Post Falls HS (ID)
- 2002: Utah State (GA)
- 2003–2004: Utah State (S/ST)
- 2005: Eastern Illinois (ST)
- 2006–2008: Boise State (RB/ST)
- 2009–2011: Boise State (LB/ST)
- 2012: Washington State (LB)
- 2013: Florida (LB/ST)
- 2013–2015: Washington (DL/ST)
- 2016–2020: Montana State
- 2021–2023: Texas (co-DC/ILB)
- 2024–present: Nevada

Head coaching record
- Overall: 39–47 (college)
- Tournaments: 3–2 (NCAA D-I playoffs)

Jeffrey Phillip Choate (born July 15, 1970) is an American college football coach. He is the head coach at the University of Nevada, Reno. Choate served as the head football coach at Montana State University from 2016 to 2019.

== Playing career ==
Choate graduated from St. Maries High School in 1988, and played college football at the University of Montana Western as linebacker from 1988 until 1991. While pursuing a bachelor's degree in secondary education, he became the Bulldogs' linebackers coach.

== Coaching career ==
Choate began his coaching career as the University of Washington Football defensive line coach and special teams coordinator for two seasons (2013-2015).

On December 4, 2015, Montana State University announced Choate as their head football coach beginning in the 2016 season.

On December 4, 2023, he was named the head coach at Nevada.

== Head coaching record ==
=== College ===
Year	Team	Overall	Conference	Standing	Bowl/playoffs	Coaches^{#}	AP/STATS^{°}
Montana State Bobcats (Big Sky Conference) (2016–2019)
2016	Montana State	4–7	2–6	T–9th			
2017	Montana State	5–6	5–3	T–6th			
2018	Montana State	8–5	5–3	T–4th	L NCAA Division I Second Round	17	17
2019	Montana State	11–4	6–2	T–3rd	L NCAA Division I Semifinal	4	4
2020–21	No team—COVID-19						
Montana State:		28–22	18–14				
Nevada Wolf Pack (Mountain West Conference) (2024–present)
2024	Nevada	3–10	0–7	12th			
2025	Nevada	3–9	2–6	T–9th			
2026	Nevada	5-6	4-3				
Nevada:		11–25	6–16				
Total:		39–47					
