= Comcast Entertainment Television =

Comcast Entertainment Television (CET) was a regional cable channel serving Comcast's cable systems in the Denver, Colorado market and in parts of the state of Utah. The channel was launched on September 1, 2004, then ceased operations in June 2018. It was seen on channel 105 (channel 5 before April 13, 2010) in the Denver and Colorado Springs markets, and on channel 6 in Utah.

Similar to the northeast region's Comcast Network, its programming related to communities along Colorado's Front Range or a high school game of the week in the state of Utah. Programming including documentaries, movies, high school sports, music, lifestyle shows, and select Northern Colorado and Denver athletic events. In August 2009, they started airing some cartoons during week day afternoons. The channel also aired 30 minute programs that gave viewers more information and previews of some of the best programs available each month on other cable channels.

Talent who have had shows on CET include Louis and Floorwax from The Fox radio, who hosted a comedy show on Friday nights in 2008. Mike Boyle from the Mike Boyle Restaurant Show on KNUS radio hosted a 5-part restaurant series in 2009. Jann Scott formerly KNUS, KTLK, currently Boulder Channel 22 hosted Colorado Magazine on CET from 2007 to 2009.

CET served as the primary Emergency Alert System cable channel for Comcast's Denver systems; all channels switched to CET when the EAS wad activated. In some events when the EAS was activated for weather-related emergencies, Denver's NOAA Weather Radio could be heard.
