= 2016 NCAA Division I FCS football rankings =

- Season: 2016
- Duration: August 2016 – January 2017
- National Champions: January 7, 2017

The 2016 National Collegiate Athletic Association (NCAA) Division I Football Championship Subdivision (FCS) football rankings comprises two human polls; in addition to various publications' preseason polls. Unlike the Football Bowl Subdivision (FBS), college football's governing body, the NCAA, bestows the national championship title through a 24-team tournament. The following weekly polls determine the top 25 teams at the NCAA Division I Football Championship Subdivision level of college football for the 2016 season. The STATS poll is voted by media members while the Coaches' Poll is determined by coaches at the FCS level.

The NCAA Division I FCS Selection Committee released its Top 10 beginning in Week 9, and continues up to the week of the announcement of the full playoff field on November 20.

== Legend ==
Legend
	Increase in ranking
	Decrease in ranking
	Not ranked previous week
Italics	Number of first place votes
(#–#)	Win–loss record
т	Tied with team above or below also with this symbol

== STATS Poll ==
	Preseason Aug 8	Week 1 Sep 5	Week 2 Sep 12	Week 3 Sep 19	Week 4 Sep 26	Week 5 Oct 3	Week 6 Oct 10	Week 7 Oct 17	Week 8 Oct 24	Week 9 Oct 31	Week 10 Nov 7	Week 11 Nov 14	Week 12 Nov 20	Week 13 (Final) Jan 9	
1.	North Dakota State 152	North Dakota State 137 (1–0)	North Dakota State 151 (2–0)	North Dakota State 167 (3–0)	North Dakota State 164 (3–0)	North Dakota State 164 (4–0)	North Dakota State 160 (5–0)	Sam Houston State 113 (6–0)	Sam Houston State 120 (7–0)	Sam Houston State 102 (8–0)	Sam Houston State 113 (9–0)	Sam Houston State 108 (10–0)	Sam Houston State 111 (11–0)	James Madison 154 (14–1)	1.
2.	Sam Houston State 2	Richmond 21 (1–0)	Richmond 18 (2–0)	Sam Houston State (2–0)	Sam Houston State (3–0)	Sam Houston State (4–0)	Sam Houston State (5–0)	Jacksonville State 19 (5–1)	Jacksonville State 16 (6–1)	Jacksonville State 15 (7–1)	Jacksonville State 19 (8–1)	Jacksonville State 18 (9–1)	Jacksonville State 15 (10–1)	Youngstown State (12–4)	2.
3.	Jacksonville State 4	Northern Iowa 5 (1–0)	Sam Houston State (1–0)	Jacksonville State (2–1)	Jacksonville State (3–1)	Jacksonville State (3–1)	Jacksonville State (4–1)	Eastern Washington 17 (5–1)	Eastern Washington 18 (6–1)	Eastern Washington 18 (7–1)	Eastern Washington 19 (8–1)	Eastern Washington 21 (9–1)	Eastern Washington 14 (10–1)	North Dakota State (12–2)	3.
4.	Richmond	Sam Houston State (1–0)	Jacksonville State (1–1)	Eastern Washington (2–1)	Eastern Washington (3–1)	Eastern Washington (4–1)	Eastern Washington (5–1)	North Dakota State 11 (5–1)	North Dakota State 6 (6–1)	North Dakota State 4 (7–1)	North Dakota State 4 (8–1)	North Dakota State 7 (9–1)	North Dakota State 10 (10–1)	Eastern Washington (12–2)	4.
5.	Northern Iowa	Jacksonville State 1 (1–0)	Illinois State (2–0)	Chattanooga (3–0)	Chattanooga (4–0)	Chattanooga (5–0)	Chattanooga (6–0)	The Citadel 5 (6–0)	The Citadel 3 (7–0)	The Citadel 3 (8–0)	The Citadel 7 (9–0)	The Citadel 6 (10–0)	James Madison 1 (10–1)	Sam Houston State (12–1)	5.
6.	Chattanooga	Chattanooga (1–0)	Chattanooga (2–0)	Montana (2–0)	Richmond (3–1)	Richmond (4–1)	Richmond (5–1)	Richmond (6–1)	Richmond (7–1)	Richmond (7–1)	James Madison (8–1)	James Madison (9–1)	The Citadel (10–1)	South Dakota State (9–4)	6.
7.	Charleston Southern	Charleston Southern (1–1)	Montana (2–0)	Richmond (2–1)	James Madison (3–1)	James Madison (4–1)	James Madison (5–1)	South Dakota State (4–2)	South Dakota State (5–2)	James Madison (7–1)	Chattanooga (8–1)	Richmond (8–2)	South Dakota State (8–3)	Jacksonville State (10–2)	7.
8.	South Dakota State	Eastern Washington 1 (1–0)	Eastern Washington (1–1)	William & Mary (2–1)	Western Illinois (3–0)	Charleston Southern (3–2)	The Citadel (5–0)	James Madison (6–1)	James Madison (6–1)	Charleston Southern (5–2)	Richmond (7–2)	South Dakota State (7–3)	North Dakota (9–2)	Richmond (10–4)	8.
9.	William & Mary	South Dakota State (0–1)	South Dakota State (1–1)	Illinois State (2–1)	The Citadel (3–0)	The Citadel (4–0)	Charleston Southern (3–2)	Charleston Southern (3–2)	Charleston Southern (4–2)	Chattanooga (8–1)	Villanova (7–2)	North Carolina A&T (9–1)	Villanova (8–3)	Wofford (10–4)	9.
10.	Illinois State	Illinois State (1–0)	Northern Iowa (1–1)	The Citadel (3–0)	Charleston Southern (2–2)	Montana (3–1)	Montana (4–1)	Montana (5–1)	Chattanooga (7–1)	Villanova (6–2)	North Carolina A&T (8–1)	North Dakota (9–2)	Charleston Southern (7–3)	The Citadel (10–2)	10.
11.	McNeese State	McNeese State (1–0)	James Madison (2–0)	James Madison (2–1)	Montana (2–1)	Northern Iowa (2–2)	South Dakota State (3–2)	Chattanooga (6–1)	Villanova (6–2)	North Carolina A&T (7–1)	South Dakota State (6–3)	Central Arkansas (9–1)	Chattanooga (8–3)	Villanova (9–4)	11.
12.	James Madison	James Madison (1–0)	Charleston Southern (1–2)	Charleston Southern (1–2)	Northern Iowa (1–2)	South Dakota State (2–2)	Western Illinois (4–1)	Western Illinois (5–1)	North Carolina A&T (6–1)	Western Illinois (6–2)	North Dakota (8–2)	Chattanooga (8–2)	Richmond (8–3)	North Dakota (9–3)	12.
13.	Montana	William & Mary (0–1)	William & Mary (1–1)	Western Illinois (2–0)	Eastern Illinois (3–1)	Western Illinois (3–1)	Villanova (5–1)	Youngstown State (5–1)	Western Illinois (5–2)	South Dakota State (5–3)	Central Arkansas (8–1)	Villanova (7–3)	Youngstown State (8–3)	Chattanooga (9–4)	13.
14.	Eastern Washington	Montana (1–0)	McNeese State (1–1)	Northern Iowa (1–2)	Coastal Carolina (3–1)	Villanova (4–1)	Youngstown State (4–1)	North Carolina A&T (5–1)	Cal Poly (5–2)	Cal Poly (6–2)	Charleston Southern (5–3)	Charleston Southern (6–3)	Central Arkansas (9–2)	Central Arkansas (10–3)	14.
15.	The Citadel	The Citadel (1–0)	The Citadel (2–0)	South Dakota State (1–2)	South Dakota State (1–2)	Youngstown State (3–1)	North Carolina A&T (4–1)	Eastern Illinois (5–2)	Youngstown State (5–2)	Youngstown State (6–2)	Coastal Carolina (7–2)	Youngstown State (7–3)	Coastal Carolina (9–2)	Charleston Southern (7–4)	15.
16.	Coastal Carolina	Portland State (1–0)	Western Illinois (2–0)	Youngstown State (2–1)	Cal Poly (3–1)	Albany (4–0)	Coastal Carolina (3–2)	Villanova (5–2)	Montana (5–2)	North Dakota (7–2)	Cal Poly (6–3)	Coastal Carolina (8–2)	Grambling State (8–1)	Grambling State (11–1)	16.
17.	Portland State	Coastal Carolina (1–0)	Coastal Carolina (2–0)	Coastal Carolina (2–1)	Villanova (3–1)	Coastal Carolina (3–2)	Albany (4–1)	Cal Poly (4–2) т	North Dakota (6–2)	Central Arkansas (7–1)	Youngstown State (6–3)	Grambling State (7–1)	North Carolina A&T (9–2)	New Hampshire (8–5)	17.
18.	Northern Arizona	Western Illinois (1–0)	North Carolina A&T (2–0)	Eastern Illinois (2–1)	Illinois State (2–2)	North Carolina A&T (3–1)	Eastern Illinois (4–2)	Coastal Carolina (4–2) т	Coastal Carolina (5–2)	Coastal Carolina (6–2)	Montana (6–3)	Samford (7–3)	Lehigh (9–2)	Coastal Carolina (10–2)	18.
19.	North Dakota	Northern Arizona (0–1)	Portland State (1–1)	Villanova (2–1)	William & Mary (2–2)	Eastern Illinois (3–2)	Cal Poly (3–2)	North Dakota (5–2)	Central Arkansas (6–1)	Montana (5–3)	Western Illinois (6–3)	Lehigh (8–2)	Wofford (8–3)	San Diego (10–2)	19.
20.	Western Illinois	Youngstown State (1–0)	Youngstown State (1–1)	Stony Brook (2–1)	Youngstown State (2–1)	McNeese State (3–2)	Harvard (4–0)	Central Arkansas (5–1)	Samford (6–1)	Samford (6–2)	Grambling State (6–1)	Wofford (7–3)	North Carolina Central (9–2)	North Carolina A&T (9–3)	20.
21.	Colgate	Colgate (0–1)	Villanova (1–1)	North Carolina A&T (2–1)	Albany (4–0)	Cal Poly (3–2)	Northern Iowa (2–3)	Samford (5–1)	Grambling State (5–1)	Grambling State (5–1)	New Hampshire (6–3)	Cal Poly (6–4)	Cal Poly (7–4)	Lehigh (9–3)	21.
22.	New Hampshire	Villanova (0–1)	New Hampshire (1–1)	Albany (3–0)	North Carolina A&T (2–1)	Harvard (3–0)	North Dakota (4–2)	Grambling State (4–1)	Stony Brook (5–2)	New Hampshire (6–3)	Samford (6–3)	Montana (6–4)	New Hampshire (7–4)	North Carolina Central (9–3)	22.
23.	Villanova	North Carolina A&T (1–0)	Colgate (0–1)	Colgate (1–1)	McNeese State (2–2)	Illinois State (2–3)	Central Arkansas (4–1)	Albany (4–2)	Eastern Illinois (5–3)	Harvard (6–1)	Lehigh (8–2)	Western Illinois (6–4)	Samford (7–4)	Samford (7–5)	23.
24.	Towson	New Hampshire (0–1)	Northern Arizona (0–2)	McNeese State (1–2)	Indiana State (3–1)	North Dakota (3–2)	Samford (4–1)	Stony Brook (4–2)	Harvard (5–1)	Lehigh (7–2)	Harvard (7–1)	North Carolina Central (8–2)	San Diego (9–1)	Cal Poly (7–5)	24.
25.	North Carolina A&T	North Dakota (0–1)	Albany (2–0)	Portland State (1–2)	Harvard (2–0)	Central Arkansas (4–1)	Grambling State (4–1)	Tennessee State (5–1)	Tennessee State (5–2)	Stony Brook (5–3)	Liberty (6–3)	Saint Francis (7–3)	Weber State (7–4)	Weber State (7–5)	25.
	Preseason Aug 8	Week 1 Sep 5	Week 2 Sep 12	Week 3 Sep 19	Week 4 Sep 26	Week 5 Oct 3	Week 6 Oct 10	Week 7 Oct 17	Week 8 Oct 24	Week 9 Oct 31	Week 10 Nov 7	Week 11 Nov 14	Week 12 Nov 20	Week 13 (Final) Jan 9	
		Dropped: 24. Towson	Dropped: 25. North Dakota	Dropped: 22. New Hampshire; 24. Northern Arizona	Dropped: 20. Stony Brook; 23. Colgate; 25. Portland State	Dropped: 19. William & Mary; 24. Indiana State	Dropped: 20. McNeese State; 23. Illinois State	Dropped: 20. Harvard; 21. Northern Iowa	Dropped: 23. Albany	Dropped: 23. Eastern Illinois; 25. Tennessee State	Dropped: 25. Stony Brook	Dropped: 21. New Hampshire; 24. Harvard; 25. Liberty	Dropped: 22. Montana; 23. Western Illinois; 25. Saint Francis	None	

== Coaches' Poll ==
	Preseason Aug 8	Week 1 Sep 5	Week 2 Sep 12	Week 3 Sep 19	Week 4 Sep 26	Week 5 Oct 3	Week 6 Oct 10	Week 7 Oct 17	Week 8 Oct 24	Week 9 Oct 31	Week 10 Nov 7	Week 11 Nov 14	Week 12 Nov 21	Week 13 (Final) Jan 9	
1.	North Dakota State 25	North Dakota State 23 (1–0)	North Dakota State 24 (2–0)	North Dakota State 26 (3–0)	North Dakota State 26 (3–0)	North Dakota State 26 (4–0)	North Dakota State 26 (5–0)	Sam Houston State 21 (6–0)	Sam Houston State 23 (7–0)	Sam Houston State 22 (8–0)	Sam Houston State 22 (9–0)	Sam Houston State 21 (10–0)	Sam Houston State 22 (11–0)	James Madison 26 (14–1)	1.
2.	Sam Houston State	Richmond 3 (1–0)	Richmond 2 (2–0)	Sam Houston State (2–0)	Sam Houston State (3–0)	Sam Houston State (4–0)	Sam Houston State (5–0)	Jacksonville State 2 (5–1)	Jacksonville State 2 (6–1)	Jacksonville State 2 (7–1)	Jacksonville State 2 (8–1)	Jacksonville State 2 (9–1)	Jacksonville State 2 (10–1)	Youngstown State (12–4)	2.
3.	Jacksonville State	Northern Iowa (1–0) т	Sam Houston State (1–0)	Chattanooga (3–0)	Chattanooga (4–0)	Chattanooga (5–0)	Chattanooga (6–0)	Eastern Washington 1 (5–1)	Eastern Washington 1 (6–1)	Eastern Washington 1 (7–1)	Eastern Washington 1 (8–1)	Eastern Washington 1 (9–1)	North Dakota State 1 (10–1)	North Dakota State (12–2)	3.
4.	Richmond	Sam Houston State (1–0) т	Chattanooga (2–0)	Jacksonville State (2–1)	Jacksonville State (3–1)	Jacksonville State (4–1)	Jacksonville State (4–1)	North Dakota State 1 (5–1)	North Dakota State (6–1)	North Dakota State 1 (7–1)	North Dakota State 1 (8–1)	North Dakota State 1 (9–1)	Eastern Washington 1 (10–1)	Eastern Washington (12–2)	4.
5.	Northern Iowa	Jacksonville State (1–0)	Illinois State (2–0)	Eastern Washington (2–1)	Eastern Washington (3–1)	Eastern Washington (4–1)	Eastern Washington (5–1)	James Madison 1 (5–1)	James Madison (6–1)	James Madison (7–1)	James Madison (8–1)	James Madison 1 (9–1)	James Madison (10–1)	Sam Houston State (12–1)	5.
6.	Charleston Southern	Chattanooga (1–0)	Jacksonville State (1–1)	Montana (2–0)	James Madison (3–1)	James Madison (4–1)	James Madison (5–1)	The Citadel (6–0)	Richmond (7–1)	Richmond (7–1)	The Citadel (9–0)	The Citadel (10–0)	The Citadel (10–1)	Jacksonville State (10–2)	6.
7.	Chattanooga	Charleston Southern (0–1)	Eastern Washington (1–1)	James Madison (2–1)	Richmond (3–1)	Richmond (4–1)	Richmond (5–1)	Richmond (6–1)	The Citadel (7–0)	The Citadel (8–0)	Chattanooga (8–1)	Richmond (8–2)	South Dakota State (8–3)	South Dakota State (9–4)	7.
8.	Illinois State	Eastern Washington (1–0)	James Madison (2–0)	William & Mary (2–1)	Charleston Southern (2–2) т	Charleston Southern (3–2)	Charleston Southern (3–2)	Chattanooga (6–1)	Chattanooga (7–1)	Chattanooga (8–1)	Richmond (7–2)	North Dakota (9–2)	North Dakota (9–2)	Richmond (10–4)	8.
9.	McNeese State	Illinois State (1–0)	Montana (2–0)	Richmond (2–1)	Western Illinois (3–0) т	The Citadel (4–0)	The Citadel (5–0)	Charleston Southern (3–2)	Charleston Southern (4–2)	Charleston Southern (5–2)	North Carolina A&T (8–1)	North Carolina A&T (9–1)	Chattanooga (8–3)	The Citadel (10–2)	9.
10.	William & Mary	McNeese State (1–0)	South Dakota State (1–1)	The Citadel (3–0)	The Citadel (3–0)	Montana (3–1)	Montana (4–1)	Montana (5–1)	South Dakota State (5–2)	North Carolina A&T (7–1)	North Dakota (8–2)	South Dakota State (7–3)	Charleston Southern (7–3)	Chattanooga (9–4)	10.
11.	James Madison	James Madison (1–0)	Northern Iowa (1–1)	Charleston Southern (1–2)	Montana (2–1)	Northern Iowa (2–2)	Villanova (5–1)	South Dakota State (4–2)	North Carolina A&T (6–1)	North Dakota (7–2)	Villanova (7–2)	Chattanooga (8–2)	Villanova (8–3)	Wofford (10–4)	11.
12.	Portland State	South Dakota State (0–1)	Charleston Southern (1–2)	Illinois State (2–1)	Northern Iowa (1–2)	Villanova (4–1)	Youngstown State (4–1)	Youngstown State (5–1)	North Dakota (6–2)	Villanova (6–2)	South Dakota State (6–3)	Central Arkansas (9–1)	Youngstown State (8–3) т	North Dakota (9–3)	12.
13.	Montana	William & Mary (0–1)	McNeese State (1–1)	Western Illinois (2–0)	Eastern Illinois (3–1)	Youngstown State (3–1)	Western Illinois (4–1)	Western Illinois (5–1)	Villanova (6–2)	Youngstown State (6–2)	Central Arkansas (8–1)	Charleston Southern (6–3)	Richmond (8–3) т	Villanova (9–4)	13.
14.	South Dakota State	Portland State (1–0)	William & Mary (1–1)	Northern Iowa (1–2)	Villanova (3–1)	Western Illinois (3–1)	South Dakota State (3–2)	North Carolina A&T (5–1)	Youngstown State (5–2)	Western Illinois (6–2)	Charleston Southern (5–3)	Youngstown State (7–3)	Grambling State (9–1)	Charleston Southern (7–4)	14.
15.	The Citadel	Montana (1–0)	The Citadel (2–0)	Villanova (2–1)	Youngstown State (2–1)	South Dakota State (2–2)	Harvard (4–0)	Eastern Illinois (4–2)	Western Illinois (5–2)	South Dakota State (5–3)	Youngstown State (6–3)	Villanova (7–3)	Lehigh (9–2)	Grambling State (12–1)	15.
16.	Colgate	The Citadel (1–0)	Western Illinois (2–0)	Eastern Illinois (2–1)	South Dakota State (1–2)	Harvard (3–0)	North Carolina A&T (4–1)	North Dakota (5–2)	Montana (5–2)	Cal Poly (6–2)	Grambling State (7–1)	Grambling State (8–2)	Central Arkansas (9–2)	Central Arkansas (10–3)	16.
17.	Eastern Washington	Northern Arizona (0–1)	Portland State (1–1)	Youngstown State (2–1)	William & Mary (2–2)	Albany (4–0)	Eastern Illinois (4–2)	Villanova (5–2)	Cal Poly (5–2)	Central Arkansas (7–1)	Montana (6–3)	Lehigh (7–3)	North Carolina A&T (9–2)	New Hampshire (8–5)	17.
18.	Northern Arizona	Western Illinois (1–0)	Villanova (1–1)	South Dakota State (1–2)	Cal Poly (3–1)	North Carolina A&T (3–1)	North Dakota (4–2)	Cal Poly (4–2) т	Central Arkansas (6–1)	Samford (6–2)	Lehigh (8–2)	Samford (7–3)	North Carolina Central (9–2)	Lehigh (9–3)	18.
19.	Harvard	Villanova (0–1)	North Carolina A&T (2–0)	Harvard (1–0)	Harvard (2–0)	McNeese State (3–2)	Albany (4–1)	Central Arkansas (5–1) т	Samford (6–1)	Grambling State (6–1)	Western Illinois (6–3)	Wofford (7–3)	Wofford (8–3)	North Carolina Central (9–3)	19.
20.	Fordham	Colgate (0–1)	Youngstown State (1–1)	McNeese State (1–2)	Illinois State (2–2)	Eastern Illinois (3–2)	Cal Poly (3–2)	Samford (5–1)	Stony Brook (5–2)	Montana (5–3)	Cal Poly (6–3)	North Carolina Central (8–2)	Cal Poly (7–4)	North Carolina A&T (9–3)	20.
21.	North Dakota	Harvard (0–0)	Southern Utah (1–1)	Colgate (1–1)	Albany (4–0)	North Dakota (3–2)	Northern Iowa (2–3)	Grambling State (4–1)	Grambling State (5–1)	Lehigh (7–2)	Samford (6–3)	Montana (6–4)	New Hampshire (7–4)	Cal Poly (7–5) т	21.
22.	Villanova	Youngstown State (1–0)	Harvard (0–0)	North Carolina A&T (2–1)	McNeese State (2–2)	Cal Poly (3–2)	Central Arkansas (4–1)	Stony Brook (4–2)	Eastern Illinois (5–3)	Harvard (6–1)	Harvard (7–1)	Kennesaw State (8–2)	Montana (6–5)	San Diego (10–2) т	22.
23.	Southern Utah	Southern Utah (0–1)	Colgate (0–1)	Albany (3–0)	North Carolina A&T (2–1)	Illinois State (2–3)	Grambling State (3–1)	Harvard (4–1)	Harvard (5–1)	New Hampshire (6–3)	New Hampshire (6–3)	Cal Poly (6–4)	Weber State (7–4)	Samford (7–5)	23.
24.	Western Illinois	North Carolina A&T (1–0)	Northern Arizona (0–2)	Stony Brook (2–1)	Southern Utah (2–1)	Central Arkansas (4–1)	Samford (4–1)	Albany (4–2)	Lehigh (6–2)	Eastern Illinois (5–4)	Liberty (6–3)	Western Illinois (6–4)	Samford (7–4)	Weber State (7–5)	24.
25.	North Carolina A&T	Fordham (0–1)	Albany (2–0)	Portland State (1–2) т; Northern Arizona (1–2) т	Colgate (1–2)	Grambling State (4–1)	New Hampshire (4–2)	Tennessee State (5–1)	South Dakota (4–3)	Stony Brook (5–3)	North Carolina Central (7–2)	Illinois State (6–5)	San Diego (9–1)	Montana (6–5)	25.
	Preseason Aug 8	Week 1 Sep 5	Week 2 Sep 12	Week 3 Sep 19	Week 4 Sep 26	Week 5 Oct 3	Week 6 Oct 10	Week 7 Oct 17	Week 8 Oct 24	Week 9 Oct 31	Week 10 Nov 7	Week 11 Nov 14	Week 12 Nov 21	Week 13 (Final) Jan 9	
		Dropped: 21. North Dakota	Dropped: 25. Fordham	Dropped: 21. Southern Utah	Dropped: 24. Stony Brook; 25. Portland State; 25. Northern Arizona	Dropped: 17. William & Mary; 24. Southern Utah; 25. Colgate	Dropped: 19. McNeese State; 23. Illinois State	Dropped: 21. Northern Iowa; 25. New Hampshire	Dropped: 24. Albany; 25. Tennessee State	Dropped: 25. South Dakota	Dropped: 24. Eastern Illinois; 25. Stony Brook	Dropped: 22. Harvard; 23. New Hampshire; 24. Liberty	Dropped: 22. Kennesaw State; 24. Western Illinois; 25. Illinois State	None	

== Rankings for the FCS Playoffs ==
	Week 9 Nov 3	Week 10 Nov 10	Week 11 Nov 15	
1.	Jacksonville State (7–1)	Jacksonville State (8–1)	North Dakota State (9–1)	1.
2.	Sam Houston State (8–0)	Eastern Washington (8–1)	Eastern Washington (9–1)	2.
3.	Eastern Washington (7–1)	North Dakota State (8–1)	Jacksonville State (9–1)	3.
4.	North Dakota State (7–1)	James Madison (8–1)	James Madison (9–1)	4.
5.	James Madison (7–1)	Sam Houston State (9–0)	Sam Houston State (10–0)	5.
6.	The Citadel (8–0)	The Citadel (9–0)	The Citadel (10–0)	6.
7.	Richmond (7–1)	Chattanooga (8–1)	Central Arkansas (9–1)	7.
8.	Chattanooga (8–1)	Richmond (7–2)	Richmond (8–2)	8.
9.	Charleston Southern (6–2)	Central Arkansas (8–1)	North Dakota (9–2)	9.
10.	Central Arkansas (7–1)	North Dakota (8–2)	South Dakota State (7–3)	10.
	Week 9 Nov 3	Week 10 Nov 10	Week 11 Nov 15	
		Dropped: 9. Charleston Southern	Dropped: 7. Chattanooga	
