= 2016 NCAA Division I FCS football season =

American college football season

2016 NCAA Division I FCS season

Regular season
- Number of teams: 125
- Duration: August 26 – December 3
- Payton Award: Sam Houston State quarterback Jeremiah Briscoe
- Buchanan Award: Northern Iowa defensive end Karter Schult

Playoff
- Duration: November 26 – December 17
- Championship date: January 7, 2017
- Championship site: Toyota Stadium, Frisco, Texas
- Champion: James Madison

NCAA Division I FCS football seasons
- «2015 2017»

The 2016 NCAA Division I FCS football season, part of college football in the United States, was organized by the National Collegiate Athletic Association (NCAA) at the Division I Football Championship Subdivision (FCS) level. The NCAA Division I Football Championship Game was played on January 7, 2017, in Frisco, Texas. The James Madison Dukes defeated the Youngstown State Penguins, 28–14, to capture their second national championship in team history.

== Conference changes and new programs ==
| School | 2015 conference | 2016 conference |
|---|---|---|
| Coastal Carolina | Big South | FCS independent |
| East Tennessee State | FCS independent | SoCon |

== Notable headlines ==
- April 20 – The NCAA banned five schools from the 2016 postseason for failure to meet Academic Progress Rate criteria: Florida A&M, Howard, Morgan State, Savannah State, and Southern.
- April 28 – Following the March 1 announcement by the Sun Belt Conference that it would not renew its football-only membership agreements with Idaho and New Mexico State when they expire at the end of the 2017 season, Idaho announced that it would return to FCS football in its all-sports league, the Big Sky Conference, in 2018. The Vandals thus became the first team ever to voluntarily drop from FBS to FCS.
- September 17 – East Tennessee State and Western Carolina played on a temporary fieldturf surface installed on the infield of the Bristol Motor Speedway. The same NASCAR racetrack hosted a game between Tennessee and Virginia Tech one week earlier.
- November 19 – Joe Thomas Sr., a 55-year-old walk-on at South Carolina State, appeared for one play in the first quarter of the Bulldogs' season finale against Savannah State, rushing for 3 yards. Although the NCAA does not keep statistics on player ages, the father of Green Bay Packers linebacker Joe Thomas Jr. is believed to be the oldest player ever to take the field in a Division I game.

== FCS team wins over FBS teams ==
Italics denotes FBS teams.

| Date | Visiting team | Home team | Site | Result | Attendance | Ref. |
|---|---|---|---|---|---|---|
| September 2 | Albany | Buffalo | University at Buffalo Stadium • Amherst, New York | 22–16 | 18,657 | |
| September 3 | No. 14 Eastern Washington | Washington State | Martin Stadium • Pullman, Washington | 45–42 | 32,952 | |
| September 3 | No. 5 Northern Iowa | Iowa State | Jack Trice Stadium • Ames, Iowa | 25–20 | 60,629 | |
| September 3 | No. 4 Richmond | Virginia | Scott Stadium • Charlottesville, Virginia | 37–20 | 49,270 | |
| September 10 | Eastern Illinois | Miami (OH) | Yager Stadium • Oxford, Ohio | 21–17 | 17,369 | |
| September 10 | No. 10 Illinois State | Northwestern | Ryan Field • Evanston, Illinois | 9–7 | 30,635 | |
| September 10 | No. 23 North Carolina A&T | Kent State | Dix Stadium • Kent, Ohio | 39–36 ^{4OT} | 13,540 | |
| September 17 | No. 1 North Dakota State | No. 13 (FBS) Iowa | Kinnick Stadium • Iowa City, Iowa | 23–21 | 70,585 | |
| September 24 | Central Arkansas | Arkansas State | Centennial Bank Stadium • Jonesboro, Arkansas | 28–23 | 28,012 | |
| September 24 | No. 13 Western Illinois | Northern Illinois | Huskie Stadium • DeKalb, Illinois | 28–23 | 15,496 | |
^{#}Rankings from STATS poll released prior to the game.

== Conference standings ==
2016 Big Sky Conference football standings
| | Conf. | | | Overall |
| Team | W | | L | W | | L |
|---|---|---|---|---|---|---|
| No. 4 Eastern Washington +^ | 8 | – | 0 | 12 | – | 2 |
| No. 12 North Dakota +^ | 8 | – | 0 | 9 | – | 3 |
| No. 25 Weber State ^ | 6 | – | 2 | 7 | – | 5 |
| No. 24 Cal Poly ^ | 5 | – | 3 | 7 | – | 5 |
| Southern Utah | 5 | – | 3 | 6 | – | 5 |
| Northern Colorado | 4 | – | 4 | 6 | – | 5 |
| Northern Arizona | 4 | – | 4 | 5 | – | 6 |
| Montana | 3 | – | 5 | 6 | – | 5 |
| Montana State | 2 | – | 6 | 4 | – | 7 |
| Portland State | 2 | – | 6 | 3 | – | 8 |
| UC Davis | 2 | – | 6 | 3 | – | 8 |
| Sacramento State | 2 | – | 6 | 2 | – | 9 |
| Idaho State | 1 | – | 7 | 2 | – | 9 |
$ – Conference champion; ^ – FCS playoff participant; Rankings from STATS Poll

2016 Big South Conference football standings
| | Conf. | | | Overall |
| Team | W | | L | W | | L |
|---|---|---|---|---|---|---|
| No. 15 Charleston Southern +^ | 4 | – | 1 | 7 | – | 4 |
| Liberty + | 4 | – | 1 | 6 | – | 5 |
| Kennesaw State | 3 | – | 2 | 8 | – | 3 |
| Gardner–Webb | 3 | – | 2 | 5 | – | 6 |
| Presbyterian | 1 | – | 4 | 2 | – | 9 |
| Monmouth | 0 | – | 5 | 4 | – | 7 |
+ – Conference co-champions; ^ – FCS playoff participant; Rankings from STATS Poll

2016 Colonial Athletic Association football standings
| | Conf. | | | Overall |
| Team | W | | L | W | | L |
|---|---|---|---|---|---|---|
| No. 1 James Madison $^ | 8 | – | 0 | 14 | – | 1 |
| No. 11 Villanova ^ | 6 | – | 2 | 9 | – | 4 |
| No. 17 New Hampshire ^ | 6 | – | 2 | 8 | – | 5 |
| No. 8 Richmond ^ | 5 | – | 3 | 10 | – | 4 |
| Maine | 5 | – | 3 | 6 | – | 5 |
| Albany | 4 | – | 4 | 7 | – | 4 |
| Stony Brook | 4 | – | 4 | 5 | – | 6 |
| William & Mary | 3 | – | 5 | 5 | – | 6 |
| Towson | 3 | – | 5 | 4 | – | 7 |
| Delaware | 2 | – | 6 | 4 | – | 7 |
| Elon | 1 | – | 7 | 2 | – | 9 |
| Rhode Island | 1 | – | 7 | 2 | – | 9 |
$ – Conference champion; ^ – FCS playoff participant; Rankings from STATS Poll

2016 Ivy League football standings
| | Conf. | | | Overall |
| Team | W | | L | W | | L |
|---|---|---|---|---|---|---|
| Princeton + | 6 | – | 1 | 8 | – | 2 |
| Penn + | 6 | – | 1 | 7 | – | 3 |
| Harvard | 5 | – | 2 | 7 | – | 3 |
| Brown | 3 | – | 4 | 4 | – | 6 |
| Yale | 3 | – | 4 | 3 | – | 7 |
| Cornell | 2 | – | 5 | 4 | – | 6 |
| Columbia | 2 | – | 5 | 3 | – | 7 |
| Dartmouth | 1 | – | 6 | 4 | – | 6 |
+ – Conference co-champions

2016 Mid-Eastern Athletic Conference football standings
| | Conf. | | | Overall |
| Team | W | | L | W | | L |
|---|---|---|---|---|---|---|
| No. 22 North Carolina Central $ | 8 | – | 0 | 9 | – | 3 |
| No. 20 North Carolina A&T ^ | 7 | – | 1 | 9 | – | 3 |
| Hampton | 5 | – | 3 | 5 | – | 6 |
| South Carolina State | 5 | – | 3 | 5 | – | 6 |
| Bethune–Cookman | 4 | – | 4 | 4 | – | 6 |
| Florida A&M * | 4 | – | 4 | 4 | – | 7 |
| Norfolk State | 3 | – | 5 | 4 | – | 7 |
| Savannah State * | 3 | – | 5 | 3 | – | 7 |
| Morgan State * | 3 | – | 5 | 3 | – | 8 |
| Howard * | 2 | – | 6 | 2 | – | 9 |
| Delaware State | 0 | – | 8 | 0 | – | 11 |
$ – Conference champion; ^ – FCS playoff participant; * Florida A&M, Howard, Morgan State, and Savannah State ineligible for postseason due to APR violations; Rankings from STATS Poll

2016 Missouri Valley Football Conference standings
| | Conf. | | | Overall |
| Team | W | | L | W | | L |
|---|---|---|---|---|---|---|
| No. 3 North Dakota State +^ | 7 | – | 1 | 12 | – | 2 |
| No. 6 South Dakota State +^ | 7 | – | 1 | 9 | – | 4 |
| No. 2 Youngstown State ^ | 6 | – | 2 | 12 | – | 4 |
| Illinois State ^ | 4 | – | 4 | 6 | – | 6 |
| Northern Iowa | 4 | – | 4 | 5 | – | 6 |
| Western Illinois | 3 | – | 5 | 6 | – | 5 |
| South Dakota | 3 | – | 5 | 4 | – | 7 |
| Indiana State | 2 | – | 6 | 4 | – | 7 |
| Missouri State | 2 | – | 6 | 4 | – | 7 |
| Southern Illinois | 2 | – | 6 | 4 | – | 7 |
+ – Conference co-champions; ^ – FCS playoff participant; Rankings from STATS Poll

2016 Northeast Conference football standings
| | Conf. | | | Overall |
| Team | W | | L | W | | L |
|---|---|---|---|---|---|---|
| Duquesne + | 5 | – | 1 | 8 | – | 3 |
| Saint Francis (PA) +^ | 5 | – | 1 | 7 | – | 5 |
| Wagner | 4 | – | 2 | 6 | – | 5 |
| Bryant | 4 | – | 2 | 5 | – | 6 |
| Sacred Heart | 1 | – | 5 | 6 | – | 5 |
| Central Connecticut | 1 | – | 5 | 2 | – | 9 |
| Robert Morris | 1 | – | 5 | 2 | – | 9 |
+ – Conference co-champions; ^ – FCS playoff participant

2016 Ohio Valley Conference football standings
| | Conf. | | | Overall |
| Team | W | | L | W | | L |
|---|---|---|---|---|---|---|
| No. 6 Jacksonville State $^ | 7 | – | 0 | 10 | – | 2 |
| UT Martin | 6 | – | 2 | 7 | – | 5 |
| Tennessee Tech | 5 | – | 3 | 5 | – | 6 |
| Tennessee State | 4 | – | 3 | 7 | – | 4 |
| Eastern Illinois | 4 | – | 4 | 6 | – | 5 |
| Murray State | 4 | – | 4 | 4 | – | 7 |
| SE Missouri State | 3 | – | 5 | 3 | – | 8 |
| Eastern Kentucky | 2 | – | 6 | 3 | – | 8 |
| Austin Peay | 0 | – | 8 | 0 | – | 11 |
$ – Conference champion; ^ – FCS playoff participant; Rankings from STATS Poll

2016 Patriot League football standings
| | Conf. | | | Overall |
| Team | W | | L | W | | L |
|---|---|---|---|---|---|---|
| No. 21 Lehigh $^ | 6 | – | 0 | 9 | – | 3 |
| Fordham | 5 | – | 1 | 8 | – | 3 |
| Colgate | 4 | – | 2 | 5 | – | 5 |
| Bucknell | 3 | – | 3 | 4 | – | 7 |
| Holy Cross | 2 | – | 4 | 4 | – | 7 |
| Lafayette | 1 | – | 5 | 2 | – | 9 |
| Georgetown | 0 | – | 6 | 3 | – | 8 |
$ – Conference champion; ^ – FCS playoff participant; Rankings from STATS Poll

2016 Pioneer Football League standings
| | Conf. | | | Overall |
| Team | W | | L | W | | L |
|---|---|---|---|---|---|---|
| No. 19 San Diego $^ | 8 | – | 0 | 10 | – | 2 |
| Dayton | 7 | – | 1 | 9 | – | 2 |
| Drake | 6 | – | 2 | 7 | – | 4 |
| Marist | 5 | – | 3 | 5 | – | 6 |
| Jacksonville | 4 | – | 3 | 5 | – | 5 |
| Campbell | 3 | – | 4 | 5 | – | 5 |
| Morehead State | 3 | – | 5 | 4 | – | 7 |
| Valparaiso | 3 | – | 5 | 4 | – | 7 |
| Butler | 2 | – | 6 | 4 | – | 7 |
| Stetson | 2 | – | 6 | 4 | – | 7 |
| Davidson | 0 | – | 8 | 2 | – | 9 |
$ – Conference champion; ^ – FCS playoff participant; Rankings from STATS Poll

2016 Southern Conference football standings
| | Conf. | | | Overall |
| Team | W | | L | W | | L |
|---|---|---|---|---|---|---|
| No. 10 The Citadel $^ | 8 | – | 0 | 10 | – | 2 |
| No. 9 Wofford ^ | 6 | – | 2 | 10 | – | 4 |
| No. 13 Chattanooga ^ | 6 | – | 2 | 9 | – | 4 |
| No. 23 Samford ^ | 5 | – | 3 | 7 | – | 5 |
| Mercer | 4 | – | 4 | 6 | – | 5 |
| Furman | 3 | – | 5 | 3 | – | 8 |
| East Tennessee State | 2 | – | 6 | 5 | – | 6 |
| Western Carolina | 1 | – | 7 | 2 | – | 9 |
| VMI | 1 | – | 7 | 3 | – | 8 |
$ – Conference champion; ^ – FCS playoff participant; Rankings from STATS Poll

2016 Southland Conference football standings
| | Conf. | | | Overall |
| Team | W | | L | W | | L |
|---|---|---|---|---|---|---|
| No. 5 Sam Houston State $^ | 9 | – | 0 | 12 | – | 1 |
| No. 14 Central Arkansas ^ | 8 | – | 1 | 10 | – | 3 |
| SE Louisiana | 7 | – | 2 | 7 | – | 4 |
| McNeese State | 5 | – | 4 | 6 | – | 5 |
| Nicholls State | 5 | – | 4 | 5 | – | 6 |
| Stephen F. Austin | 4 | – | 5 | 5 | – | 6 |
| Houston Baptist | 3 | – | 5 | 4 | – | 7 |
| Incarnate Word * | 3 | – | 6 | 3 | – | 8 |
| Lamar | 3 | – | 6 | 3 | – | 8 |
| Abilene Christian * | 2 | – | 7 | 2 | – | 9 |
| Northwestern State | 0 | – | 9 | 1 | – | 10 |
$ – Conference champion; ^ – FCS playoff participant; * – ineligible for FCS playoffs due to transition from NCAA Division II; Rankings from STATS poll

2016 Southwestern Athletic Conference football standings
| | Conf. | | | Overall |
| Team | W | | L | W | | L |
|---|---|---|---|---|---|---|
East Division
| Alcorn State xy | 5 | – | 4 | 5 | – | 6 |
| Alabama A&M | 4 | – | 5 | 4 | – | 7 |
| Alabama State | 3 | – | 6 | 4 | – | 7 |
| Jackson State | 3 | – | 6 | 3 | – | 8 |
| Mississippi Valley State | 1 | – | 8 | 1 | – | 10 |
West Division
| No. 16 Grambling State xy$ | 9 | – | 0 | 12 | – | 1 |
| Southern * | 8 | – | 1 | 8 | – | 3 |
| Prairie View A&M | 7 | – | 2 | 7 | – | 4 |
| Texas Southern | 4 | – | 5 | 4 | – | 7 |
| Arkansas–Pine Bluff | 1 | – | 8 | 1 | – | 10 |
Championship: Grambling State 27, Alcorn State 20
$ – Conference champion; x – Division champion/co-champions; y – Championship game participant; * – ineligible for postseason due to APR violations; Rankings from STATS Poll

2016 NCAA Division I FCS independents football standings
| | Conf. | | | Overall |
| Team | W | | L | W | | L |
|---|---|---|---|---|---|---|
| No. 18 Coastal Carolina | | – | | 10 | – | 2 |
Coastal Carolina ineligible for FCS playoffs as part of FBS transition; Rankings from STATS Poll

== Conference summaries ==
=== Championship games ===
| Conference | Champion | Runner-up | Score | Offensive Player of the Year | Defensive Player of the Year | Coach of the Year |
|---|---|---|---|---|---|---|
| SWAC | Grambling State; 11–1 (9–0) | Alcorn State; 5–6 (5–4) | 27–20 | Devante Kincade (Grambling State) | Tiger Donovan McCray (Grambling State) | Broderick Fobbs (Grambling State) |

=== Other conference winners ===
Note: Records are regular-season only, and do not include playoff games.

| Conference | Champion | Record | Offensive Player of the Year | Defensive Player of the Year | Coach of the Year |
|---|---|---|---|---|---|
| Big Sky | Eastern Washington; North Dakota | 10–1 (8–0); 9–2 (8–0) | Gage Gubrud (Eastern Washington); Cooper Kupp (Eastern Washington) | Cole Reyes (North Dakota) | Bubba Schweigert (North Dakota) |
| Big South | Charleston Southern; Liberty | 7–3 (4–1); 6–5 (4–1) | Tyrell Maxwell (Gardner–Webb) | Anthony Ellis (Charleston Southern) | Jamey Chadwell (Charleston Southern) |
| CAA | James Madison | 10–1 (8–0) | Bryan Schor (James Madison) | Tanoh Kpassagnon (Villanova) | Mike Houston (James Madison) |
| Ivy | Penn; Princeton | 7–3 (6–1); 8–2 (6–1) | John Lovett (Princeton) | Folarin Orimolade (Dartmouth) | Bob Surace (Princeton) |
| MEAC | North Carolina Central | 9–2 (8–0) | Tarik Cohen (North Carolina A&T) | Shaquille Leonard (South Carolina State) | Jerry Mack (North Carolina Central) |
| MVFC | North Dakota State; South Dakota State | 10–1 (7–1); 8–3 (7–1) | Taryn Christion (South Dakota State) | Karter Schult (Northern Iowa) | John Stiegelmeier (South Dakota State) |
| NEC | Duquesne; Saint Francis (PA) | 8–3 (5–1); 7–4 (5–1) | Kamron Lewis (Saint Francis) | Christian Kuntz (Duquesne) | Chris Villarrial (Saint Francis) |
| OVC | Jacksonville State | 10–1 (7–0) | Eli Jenkins (Jacksonville State) | Darius Jackson (Jacksonville State) | John Grass (Jacksonville State) |
| Patriot | Lehigh | 9–2 (6–0) | Nick Shafnisky (Lehigh) | Pat Afriyie (Colgate) | Andy Coen (Lehigh) |
| Pioneer | San Diego | 9–1 (8–0) | Jonah Hodges (San Diego) | Donald Payne (Stetson) | Dale Lindsey (San Diego) |
| Southern | The Citadel | 10–1 (8–0) | Devlin Hodges (Samford) | Keionta Davis (Chattanooga) | Brent Thompson (The Citadel) |
| Southland | Sam Houston State | 11–0 (9–0) | Overall: Jeremiah Briscoe (Sam Houston State); Offensive: Yedidiah Louis (Sam Houston State) | P. J. Hall (Sam Houston State) | K. C. Keeler (Sam Houston State) |

== Playoff qualifiers ==
=== Automatic berths for conference champions ===
| Conference | Team | Appearance | Last bid | Result |
|---|---|---|---|---|
| Big Sky Conference | Eastern Washington | 12th | 2014 | Quarterfinals (L – Illinois State) |
| Big South Conference | Charleston Southern | 2nd | 2015 | Quarterfinals (L – Jacksonville State) |
| Colonial Athletic Association | James Madison | 13th | 2015 | National Champions (W – Youngstown State) |
| Missouri Valley Football Conference | South Dakota State | 6th | 2015 | First Round (L – Montana) |
| Northeast Conference | Saint Francis (PA) | 1st | – | – |
| Ohio Valley Conference | Jacksonville State | 7th | 2015 | Championship Game (L – North Dakota State) |
| Patriot League | Lehigh | 10th | 2011 | Quarterfinals (L – North Dakota State) |
| Pioneer Football League | San Diego | 2nd | 2014 | First Round (L – Montana) |
| Southern Conference | The Citadel | 5th | 2015 | Second Round (L – Charleston Southern) |
| Southland Conference | Sam Houston State | 10th | 2015 | Semifinals (L – Jacksonville State) |

=== At large qualifiers ===
| Conference | Team | Appearance | Last bid | Result |
|---|---|---|---|---|
| Big Sky Conference | Cal Poly | 4th | 2012 | Second Round (L – Sam Houston State) |
| Big Sky Conference | North Dakota | 1st | – | – |
| Big Sky Conference | Weber State | 5th | 2009 | First Round (L – William & Mary) |
| Big South Conference | None | | | |
| Colonial Athletic Association | New Hampshire | 15th | 2015 | First Round (L – Colgate) |
| Colonial Athletic Association | Richmond | 11th | 2015 | Semifinals (L – North Dakota State) |
| Colonial Athletic Association | Villanova | 11th | 2014 | Quarterfinals (L – Sam Houston State) |
| Mid-Eastern Athletic Conference | North Carolina A&T | 5th | 2003 | First Round (L – Wofford) |
| Missouri Valley Football Conference | Illinois State | 7th | 2015 | Quarterfinals (L – Richmond) |
| Missouri Valley Football Conference | North Dakota State | 7th | 2015 | Semifinals (L - James Madison) |
| Missouri Valley Football Conference | Youngstown State | 14th | 2006 | Semifinals (L – Appalachian State) |
| Northeast Conference | None | | | |
| Ohio Valley Conference | None | | | |
| Patriot League | None | | | |
| Pioneer Football League | None | | | |
| Southern Conference | Chattanooga | 4th | 2015 | Second Round (L – Jacksonville State) |
| Southern Conference | Samford | 6th | 2013 | First Round (L – Jacksonville State) |
| Southern Conference | Wofford | 6th | 2012 | Quarterfinals (L – North Dakota State) |
| Southland Conference | Central Arkansas | 3rd | 2012 | Second Round (L – Georgia Southern) |
| Southwestern Athletic Conference | None | | | |

=== Abstentions ===
- Ivy League – Princeton
- Mid-Eastern Athletic Conference – North Carolina Central
- Southwestern Athletic Conference – Grambling State

== Postseason ==
=== Bowl game ===
| Game | Date/TV | Location | Winning Team | Losing Team | Score | Offensive MVP | Defensive MVP |
|---|---|---|---|---|---|---|---|
| Celebration Bowl | December 17; ABC | Georgia Dome; Atlanta, Georgia | Grambling State; 12–1 (9–0) | North Carolina Central; 9–3 (8–0) | 10–9 | Martez Carter (RB, Grambling State) | Jameel Jackson (DB, Grambling State) |

=== NCAA Division I playoff bracket ===
First round November 26; Campus sites ESPN3
Cal Poly* | 21
San Diego | 35
Villanova* | 31
Saint Francis (PA) | 21
New Hampshire* | 64
Lehigh | 21
Chattanooga* | 45
Weber State | 14
Central Arkansas* | 31
Illinois State | 24
Richmond* | 39
North Carolina A&T | 10
Youngstown State* | 38
Samford | 24
Wofford* | 15
Charleston Southern | 14

Second round December 3 Campus sites ESPN3
1 | North Dakota State* | 45
San Diego | 7
8 | South Dakota State* | 10
Villanova | 7
4 | James Madison* | 55
New Hampshire | 22
5 | Sam Houston State* | 41
Chattanooga | 36
2 | Eastern Washington* | 31
Central Arkansas | 14
7 | North Dakota* | 24
Richmond | 27
3 | Jacksonville State* | 24
Youngstown State | 40
6 | The Citadel* | 3
Wofford | 17

Quarterfinals; December 9 and 10; Campus sites ESPN, ESPN2, ESPN3
1 | North Dakota State* | 36
8 | South Dakota State | 10
4 | James Madison* | 65
5 | Sam Houston State | 7
2 | Eastern Washington* | 38
Richmond | 0
Youngstown State* | 30
Wofford | 23

Semifinals; December 16 and 17; Campus sites ESPN2, ESPNU
1 | North Dakota State* | 17
4 | James Madison | 27
2 | Eastern Washington* | 38
Youngstown State | 40

National Championship; January 7; 12:00 pm Toyota Stadium, Frisco, Texas; ESPN2
4 | James Madison | 28
Youngstown State | 14

* Home team
Winner
All times in Eastern Standard Time (UTC−05:00)

== Awards and honors ==
=== Walter Payton Award ===
- The Walter Payton Award is given to the year's most outstanding offensive player. Finalists:
  - Jeremiah Briscoe (QB), Sam Houston State
  - Gage Gubrud (QB), Eastern Washington
  - Cooper Kupp (WR), Eastern Washington

=== Buck Buchanan Award ===
- The Buck Buchanan Award is given to the year's most outstanding defensive player. Finalists:
  - Dylan Cole (LB), Missouri State
  - P. J. Hall (DE), Sam Houston State
  - Karter Schult (DE), Northern Iowa

=== Jerry Rice Award ===
- The Jerry Rice Award is given to the year's most outstanding freshman.
  - Winner: A. J. Hines (RB), Duquesne

=== Coaches ===
- AFCA Coach of the Year: Mike Houston, James Madison
- Eddie Robinson Award: K. C. Keeler, Sam Houston State

== Updated stadiums ==
- South Dakota State debuted Dana J. Dykhouse Stadium (capacity 19,340).
- New Hampshire debuted a major renovation of the renamed Wildcat Stadium, expanded to just over 11,000 from the previous capacity of 6,500.
- William & Mary also debuted a major renovation and expansion to its Zable Stadium, which the saw the addition of an upper deck and an increase in capacity to 12,259.
- Prairie View A&M opened its new Panther Stadium (capacity 15,000).

== Coaching changes ==
=== In-season ===
This is restricted to coaching changes that took place on or after May 1, 2016. For coaching changes that occurred earlier in 2016, see 2015 NCAA Division I FCS end-of-season coaching changes.

| School | Outgoing coach | Date | Reason | Replacement |
|---|---|---|---|---|
| Delaware | Dave Brock | October 16 | Fired | Dennis Dottin-Carter (interim) |

=== End of season ===
| School | Outgoing coach | Date | Reason | Replacement |
|---|---|---|---|---|
| Abilene Christian | Ken Collums | November 20 | Fired | Mark Ribaudo (interim) |
| Howard | Gary Harrell | November 20 | Contract was not renewed | Mike London |
| Presbyterian | Harold Nichols | November 20 | Resigned | Tommy Spangler |
| UC Davis | Ron Gould | November 20 | Fired | Dan Hawkins |
| Lamar | Ray Woodard | November 21 | Fired | Mike Schultz |
| Bryant | Marty Fine | November 30 | Resigned | James Perry |
| Lafayette | Frank Tavani | December 1 | Fired | John Garrett |
| Furman | Bruce Fowler | December 2 | Resigned | Clay Hendrix |
| Villanova | Andy Talley | December 3 | Retired | Mark Ferrante |
| Delaware | Dennis Dottin-Carter (interim) | December 13 | Permanent replacement | Danny Rocco |
| Richmond | Danny Rocco | December 13 | Hired by Delaware | Russ Huesman |
| Chattanooga | Russ Huesman | December 14 | Hired by Richmond | Tom Arth |
| Indiana State | Mike Sanford | December 16 | Resigned | Curt Mallory |
| Abilene Christian | Mark Ribaudo (interim) | December 18 | Permanent replacement | Adam Dorrel |
| Eastern Washington | Beau Baldwin | January 16 | Hired as OC at California | Aaron Best |

== Rule changes ==
The following rule changes were recommended by the NCAA Football Rules Committee for the 2022 season:

- When players are disqualified for a targeting call in the second half or in overtime (which requires a carryover penalty of sitting out the first half of the next scheduled game), an appeals process will be available to allow the National Coordinator of Officials (currently Steve Shaw) to review tapes of the targeting penalty for consideration of not requiring the player to sit out the first half of the following game.
- Injury timeouts awarded due to "deceptive actions" during a game will also be able to reviewed by the National Coordinator of Officials to determine what sanctions, if any, against teams who use this tactic, enforced at the conference or school level.
- Blocking below the waist will only be permitted inside the tackle box by linemen and stationary backs. Blocks below the waist outside of the tackle box are not allowed.
- Defensive holding will remain a 10-yard penalty but will always carry an automatic first down.
- Codifying the rule change made shortly after the 2021 ACC Championship Game, ball carriers who simulate a feet-first slide will be declared down at that spot.
- Uniform rules would require the sock/leg covering to go from the shoe to the bottom of the pants, similar to the NFL rule.

== Attendances ==
The top 10 NCAA Division I FCS football teams by average home attendance in 2016:

| # | College football team | Average attendance |
|---|---|---|
| 1 | Montana Grizzlies | 25,377 |
| 2 | James Madison Dukes | 19,844 |
| 3 | Florida A&M Rattlers | 19,710 |
| 4 | Jackson State Tigers | 19,660 |
| 5 | North Dakota State Bison | 18,556 |
| 6 | Montana State Bobcats | 17,907 |
| 7 | Jacksonville State Gamecocks | 17,576 |
| 8 | Delaware Fightin’ Blue Hens | 16,478 |
| 9 | Liberty Flames | 16,377 |
| 10 | Grambling State Tigers | 16,355 |

== See also ==
- 2016 NCAA Division I FCS football rankings
- 2016 NCAA Division I FBS football season
- 2016 NCAA Division II football season
- 2016 NCAA Division III football season
- 2016 NAIA football season
