= 2016 Youngstown State Penguins football team =

American college football season

2016 Youngstown State Penguins football

FCS Championship Game, L 14–28 vs. James Madison
- Conference: Missouri Valley Football Conference

Ranking
- STATS: No. 2
- FCS Coaches: No. 2
- Record: 12–4 (6–2 MVFC)
- Head coach: Bo Pelini (2nd season)
- Offensive coordinator: Shane Montgomery (7th season)
- Offensive scheme: Spread
- Defensive coordinator: Carl Pelini (2nd season)
- Base defense: 4–3
- Home stadium: Stambaugh Stadium

2016 Missouri Valley Football Conference standings
	Conf.			Overall
Team	W		L	W		L
No. 3 North Dakota State +^	7	–	1	12	–	2
No. 6 South Dakota State +^	7	–	1	9	–	4
No. 2 Youngstown State ^	6	–	2	12	–	4
Illinois State ^	4	–	4	6	–	6
Northern Iowa	4	–	4	5	–	6
Western Illinois	3	–	5	6	–	5
South Dakota	3	–	5	4	–	7
Indiana State	2	–	6	4	–	7
Missouri State	2	–	6	4	–	7
Southern Illinois	2	–	6	4	–	7
+ – Conference co-champions; ^ – FCS playoff participant; Rankings from STATS Poll

The 2016 Youngstown State Penguins football team represented Youngstown State University in the 2016 NCAA Division I FCS football season. They were led by second-year head coach Bo Pelini and played their home games at Stambaugh Stadium. They were a member of the Missouri Valley Football Conference. Youngstown State finished the season 12–4 overall with a 6–2 mark in MVFC play to finish in third place. They received an at-large bid to the FCS playoffs, where they defeated Samford, Jacksonville State, Wofford, and Eastern Washington to advance to the National Championship Game, where they lost to James Madison.

== Schedule ==
Date	Time	Opponent	Rank	Site	TV	Result	Attendance
September 1	7:30 pm	Duquesne*		Stambaugh Stadium; Youngstown, OH	ESPN3	W 45–10	12,219
September 10	2:00 pm	at West Virginia*	No. 20	Mountaineer Field; Morgantown, WV	RTPT	L 21–38	56,261
September 17	4:00 pm	Robert Morris*	No. 20	Stambaugh Stadium; Youngstown, OH	ESPN3	W 38–6	19,033
October 1	4:00 pm	South Dakota	No. 20	Stambaugh Stadium; Youngstown, OH	ESPN3	W 30–20	15,151
October 8	3:00 pm	at No. 23 Illinois State	No. 15	Hancock Stadium; Normal, IL	ESPN3	W 20–6	12,570
October 15	7:00 pm	No. 21 Northern Iowa	No. 14	Stambaugh Stadium; Youngstown, OH	ESPN3	W 14–10	13,373
October 22	3:00 pm	at No. 7 South Dakota State	No. 13	Dana J. Dykhouse Stadium; Brookings, SD	ESPN3	L 10–24	17,730
October 29	4:00 pm	Indiana State^{†}	No. 15	Stambaugh Stadium; Youngstown, OH	ESPN3	W 13–10	15,082
November 5	3:30 pm	at No. 4 North Dakota State	No. 15	Fargodome; Fargo, ND	ESPN3	L 3–24	18,332
November 12	12:00 pm	Southern Illinois	No. 17	Stambaugh Stadium; Youngstown, OH	ESPN3	W 21–14	11,262
November 19	3:00 pm	at Missouri State	No. 15	Robert W. Plaster Stadium; Springfield, MO	ESPN3	W 65–20	5,070
November 26	5:00 pm	No. 23 Samford*	No. 13	Stambaugh Stadium; Youngstown, OH (FCS Playoffs First Round)	ESPN3	W 38–24	5,322
December 3	2:00 pm	at No. 2 Jacksonville State*	No. 13	JSU Stadium; Jacksonville, AL (FCS Playoffs Second Round)	ESPN3	W 40–24	18,838
December 10	2:00 pm	No. 19 Wofford*	No. 13	Stambaugh Stadium; Youngstown, OH (FCS Playoffs Quarterfinals)	ESPN3	W 30–23 ^{2OT}	8,066
December 17	6:30 pm	at No. 3 Eastern Washington*	No. 13	Roos Field; Cheney, WA (FCS Playoffs Semifinals)	ESPNU	W 40–38	5,233
January 7, 2017	12:00 pm	vs. No. 5 James Madison*	No. 13	Toyota Stadium; Frisco, TX (FCS National Championship Game)	ESPN2	L 14–28	14,423
*Non-conference game; ^{†}Homecoming; Rankings from STATS Poll released prior to the game; All times are in Eastern time

== Roster ==
2016 Youngstown State Penguins football team roster
Players
Coaches
Offense

Pos.	#	Name	Class
WR	2	Darius Shackleford	Fr
WR	4	Damoun Patterson	Jr
WR	5	Alvin Bailey	Jr
QB	6	Hunter Wells	Jr
QB	7	Nathan Mays	Fr
WR	8	Robert Byrd	So
WR	9	I'tavious Harvin	Jr
WR	9	Isiah Scott	So
QB	11	Trent Hosick	Jr
QB	12	Ricky Davis	Jr
WR	13	Stefan Derrick II	Jr
WR	16	Jermiah Braswell	Fr
TB	20	Jody Webb	Sr
WR	21	Darien Townsend	Jr
WR	23	Donovan McWilson	Fr
RB	24	Devon McNutt	Fr
RB	28	London Pearson	Fr
RB	29	Martin Ruiz	Sr
TB	30	Joe Alessi	Fr
WR	36	Zack Torbert	Fr
RB	37	Tevin McCaster	So
C	51	Cole McKenry	Fr
G	54	Jarred Jones	Fr
G	60	Gavin Wiggins	So
OT	61	Justin Spencer	Jr
G	64	Norman Fox	Fr
G	67	Brock Eisenhuth	Sr
OT	68	Connor Sharp	So
C	69	Cole Newsome	Jr
C	70	Vitas Hrynkiewicz	So
OT	71	Cameron Fraser	Jr
OT	72	James Wilson	Fr
G	74	Jacob Zinni	Fr
G	75	Jason Sims	Fr
OT	77	Dylan Colucci	Sr
OT	78	Jeff Rotheram	So
WR	80	Lasander Washington	Jr
WR	81	Ryan Emans	Fr
WR	82	Samuel St. Surin	Fr
TE	83	Kevin Rader	Jr
TE	86	Shane Kuhn	Jr
WR	87	Brad Good	Jr
TE	88	Jacob Wood	Sr
WR	89	Tre'von Williams	Fr
TE	95	Anthony Parente	Jr

Defense

Pos.	#	Name	Class
CB	1	Eric Thompson	Sr
DE	2	Joshmere Dawson	Sr
FS	3	LeRoy Alexander	Sr
LB	4	Jonathan Pollock	Fr
LB	5	Lee Wright	Jr
LB	6	Jamar Pinnock	Sr
CB	7	Kenny Bishop	Sr
CB	8	Nate Dortch	Sr
DE	9	Avery Moss	Sr
S	10	Kyle Hegedus	Fr
DE	11	Derek Rivers	Fr
FS	14	Solomon Warfield	Jr
CB	15	Avery Larkin	So
FS	16	Jalyn Powell	Jr
DB	17	Billy Nicoe Hurst	Jr
CB	18	D. J. Thomas	Jr
CB	19	Chrispin Lee	So
DT	21	Jamal Smith	Fr
CB	22	Darius Hall	Fr
LB	25	Nathan Pittman	So
SS	26	Jameel Smith	Sr
SS	27	Kieran Winn	Fr
LB	28	Malachi Newell	Fr
CB	31	David Rivers III	Sr
DE	33	Johnson Louigene	So
CB	34	Mike Nash	Fr
LB	35	Christiaan Randall-Posey	Fr
FS	38	Logan Rhea	So
LB	40	Jaylin Kelly	Sr
LB	41	Curtis Parks	Fr
LB	42	Armand Dellovade	So
LB	45	Cole Kochman	Jr
DE	50	Shereif Bynum	Fr
DT	52	Savon Smith	So
DT	53	Justin Metzel	Fr
DT	55	Giacamo Cappabianca	Fr
DE	59	Simon Smith	Fr
DT	66	Cody Squiric	So
DT	76	Lamont Ragland	So
DT	90	Wesley Thompson	Fr
DT	92	Donald Mesier	Jr
DT	97	Rickey Hagood II	Sr
DE	98	Fazson Chapman	Jr

Special teams

Pos.	#	Name	Class
P	39	Nate Needham	Fr
PK	49	Connor McFadden	Jr
LS	57	Steven Wethli	So
P, TE	85	Mark Schuler	Fr
PK	99	Zak Kennedy	So

Head coach

- Bo Pelini

Coordinators/assistant coaches

- Donald D'Alesio (defensive line)

Legend

- (C) Team captain
- (S) Suspended
- (I) Ineligible
- Injured
- Redshirt

Roster

== Game summaries ==
=== Duquesne ===
	1	2	3	4	Total
Dukes	3	7	0	0	10
Penguins	10	14	7	14	45

=== At West Virginia ===
	1	2	3	4	Total
#20 Penguins	0	14	0	7	21
Mountaineers	7	7	17	7	38

=== Robert Morris ===
	1	2	3	4	Total
Colonials	0	0	6	0	6
#20 Penguins	14	3	14	7	38

=== South Dakota ===
	1	2	3	4	Total
Coyotes	3	0	3	14	20
#20 Penguins	10	10	0	10	30

=== At Illinois State ===
	1	2	3	4	Total
#15 Penguins	0	3	0	17	20
#23 Redbirds	0	0	6	0	6

=== Northern Iowa ===
	1	2	3	4	Total
#21 Panthers	0	10	0	0	10
#14 Penguins	0	0	0	14	14

=== At South Dakota State ===
	1	2	3	4	Total
#13 Penguins	3	0	0	7	10
#7 Jackrabbits	14	3	7	0	24

=== Indiana State ===
	1	2	3	4	Total
Sycamores	10	0	0	0	10
#15 Penguins	0	6	0	7	13

=== At North Dakota State ===
	1	2	3	4	Total
#15 Penguins	0	3	0	0	3
#4 Bison	17	0	0	7	24

=== Southern Illinois ===
	1	2	3	4	Total
Salukis	0	0	7	7	14
#17 Penguins	7	7	0	7	21

=== At Missouri State ===
	1	2	3	4	Total
#15 Penguins	14	20	17	14	65
Bears	0	10	0	10	20

== FCS Playoffs ==
=== First Round–Samford ===
	1	2	3	4	Total
#23 Bulldogs	7	0	0	17	24
#13 Penguins	7	3	14	14	38

=== Second Round–Jacksonville State ===
	1	2	3	4	Total
#13 Penguins	17	3	14	6	40
#2 Gamecocks	7	10	7	0	24

=== Quarterfinals–Wofford ===
	1	2	3	4	OT	2OT	Total
#19 Terriers	9	0	7	7	0	0	23
#13 Penguins	0	13	7	3	0	7	30

=== Semifinals–Eastern Washington ===
	1	2	3	4	Total
#13 Penguins	7	10	3	20	40
#3 Eagles	10	14	7	7	38

=== Championship–James Madison ===
	1	2	3	4	Total
#13 Penguins	0	7	0	7	14
#5 Dukes	14	7	7	0	28

== Ranking movements ==
Ranking movements Legend: ██ Increase in ranking ██ Decrease in ranking RV = Received votes т = Tied with team above or below
	Week													
Poll	Pre	1	2	3	4	5	6	7	8	9	10	11	12	Final
STATS FCS	RV	20	20	16	20	15	14	13	15	15	17	15	13	2
Coaches	RV	22	20	17	15	13	12	12	14	13	15	14	12–T	2
