= 2016 Western Illinois Leathernecks football team =

American college football season

2016 Western Illinois Leathernecks football
- Conference: Missouri Valley Football Conference
- Record: 6–5 (3–5 MVFC)
- Head coach: Charlie Fisher (1st season)
- Offensive coordinator: Doug Malone (1st season)
- Defensive coordinator: David Elsen (1st season)
- Home stadium: Hanson Field

2016 Missouri Valley Football Conference standings
| | Conf. | | | Overall |
| Team | W | | L | W | | L |
|---|---|---|---|---|---|---|
| No. 3 North Dakota State +^ | 7 | – | 1 | 12 | – | 2 |
| No. 6 South Dakota State +^ | 7 | – | 1 | 9 | – | 4 |
| No. 2 Youngstown State ^ | 6 | – | 2 | 12 | – | 4 |
| Illinois State ^ | 4 | – | 4 | 6 | – | 6 |
| Northern Iowa | 4 | – | 4 | 5 | – | 6 |
| Western Illinois | 3 | – | 5 | 6 | – | 5 |
| South Dakota | 3 | – | 5 | 4 | – | 7 |
| Indiana State | 2 | – | 6 | 4 | – | 7 |
| Missouri State | 2 | – | 6 | 4 | – | 7 |
| Southern Illinois | 2 | – | 6 | 4 | – | 7 |
+ – Conference co-champions; ^ – FCS playoff participant; Rankings from STATS Poll

The 2016 Western Illinois Leathernecks football team represented Western Illinois University as member of the Missouri Valley Football Conference (MVFC) during the 2016 NCAA Division I FCS football season. Led by first-year head coach Charlie Fisher, the Leathernecks compiled an overall record of 6–5 with a mark of 3–5 in conference play, tying for sixth place in the MVFC. Western Illinois played home games at Hanson Field in Macomb, Illinois.

== Schedule ==
| Date | Time | Opponent | Rank | Site | TV | Result | Attendance |
|---|---|---|---|---|---|---|---|
| September 1 | 6:00 pm | at Eastern Illinois* | No. 20 | O'Brien Field; Charleston, IL | OVCDN, WEIU | W 38–21 | 7,618 |
| September 10 | 3:00 pm | No. 19 Northern Arizona* | No. 18 | Hanson Field; Macomb, IL | ESPN3 | W 34–20 | 6,732 |
| September 24 | 2:30 pm | at Northern Illinois* | No. 13 | Huskie Stadium; DeKalb, IL | ESPN3 | W 28–23 | 15,496 |
| October 1 | 6:00 pm | at No. 15 South Dakota State | No. 8 | Dana J. Dykhouse Stadium; Brookings, SD | ESPN3 | L 14–52 | 14,155 |
| October 8 | 3:00 pm | Indiana State^{†} | No. 13 | Hanson Field; Macomb, IL | ESPN3 | W 36–35 | 5,487 |
| October 15 | 2:00 pm | at Missouri State | No. 12 | Robert W. Plaster Stadium; Springfield, MO | ESPN3 | W 38–35 | 12,639 |
| October 22 | 6:00 pm | No. 4 North Dakota State | No. 12 | Hanson Field; Macomb, IL | ESPN3 | L 13–21 | 5,329 |
| October 29 | 2:00 pm | at South Dakota | No. 13 | DakotaDome; Vermillion, SD | ESPN3, Midco SN | W 35–34 | 8,412 |
| November 5 | 1:00 pm | Illinois State | No. 12 | Hanson Field; Macomb, IL | ESPN3 | L 26–31 | 3,589 |
| November 12 | 1:00 pm | Northern Iowa | No. 19 | Hanson Field; Macomb, IL | ESPN3 | L 23–30 | 3,412 |
| November 19 | 2:00 pm | at Southern Illinois | No. 23 | Saluki Stadium; Carbondale, IL | ESPN3 | L 34–44 | 5,362 |
*Non-conference game; ^{†}Homecoming; Rankings from STATS Poll released prior to the game; All times are in Central time

== Ranking ==
Ranking movements Legend: ██ Increase in ranking ██ Decrease in ranking RV = Received votes т = Tied with team above or below
| | Week | | | | | | | | | | | | | |
| Poll | Pre | 1 | 2 | 3 | 4 | 5 | 6 | 7 | 8 | 9 | 10 | 11 | 12 | Final |
|---|---|---|---|---|---|---|---|---|---|---|---|---|---|---|
| STATS FCS | 20 | 18 | 16 | 13 | 8 | 13 | 12 | 12 | 13 | 12 | 19 | 23 | RV | RV |
| Coaches | 24 | 18 | 16 | 13 | 8–T | 14 | 13 | 13 | 15 | 14 | 19 | 24 | RV | RV |

== Game summaries ==
=== At Eastern Illinois ===
| | 1 | 2 | 3 | 4 | Total |
|---|---|---|---|---|---|
| #20 Leathernecks | 14 | 10 | 7 | 7 | 38 |
| Panthers | 7 | 0 | 14 | 0 | 21 |

=== Northern Arizona ===
| | 1 | 2 | 3 | 4 | Total |
|---|---|---|---|---|---|
| #19 Lumberjacks | 13 | 0 | 7 | 0 | 20 |
| #18 Leathernecks | 3 | 10 | 14 | 7 | 34 |

=== At Northern Illinois ===
| | 1 | 2 | 3 | 4 | Total |
|---|---|---|---|---|---|
| #13 Leathernecks | 14 | 0 | 14 | 0 | 28 |
| Huskies | 0 | 7 | 0 | 16 | 23 |

Western Illinois beat Northern Illinois, 28–23. The Leathernecks were leading 28–7 in the third quarter and held on for the win. WIU quarterback Sean McGuire went 21 for 37 for 315 yards. Wide receiver Joey Borsellino had nine catches for 148 yards. This was Western's first-ever victory over an FBS team.

=== At South Dakota State ===
| | 1 | 2 | 3 | 4 | Total |
|---|---|---|---|---|---|
| #8 Leathernecks | 14 | 0 | 0 | 0 | 14 |
| #15 Jackrabbits | 7 | 21 | 24 | 0 | 52 |

=== Indiana State ===
| | 1 | 2 | 3 | 4 | Total |
|---|---|---|---|---|---|
| Sycamores | 7 | 7 | 21 | 0 | 35 |
| #13 Leathernecks | 0 | 20 | 7 | 9 | 36 |

=== At Missouri State ===
| | 1 | 2 | 3 | 4 | Total |
|---|---|---|---|---|---|
| #12 Leathernecks | 10 | 7 | 14 | 7 | 38 |
| Bears | 0 | 7 | 7 | 21 | 35 |

=== North Dakota State ===
| | 1 | 2 | 3 | 4 | Total |
|---|---|---|---|---|---|
| #4 Bison | 7 | 14 | 0 | 0 | 21 |
| #12 Leathernecks | 3 | 3 | 7 | 0 | 13 |

=== At South Dakota ===
| | 1 | 2 | 3 | 4 | Total |
|---|---|---|---|---|---|
| #13 Leathernecks | 14 | 0 | 14 | 7 | 35 |
| Coyotes | 17 | 14 | 0 | 3 | 34 |

=== Illinois State ===
| | 1 | 2 | 3 | 4 | Total |
|---|---|---|---|---|---|
| Redbirds | 14 | 7 | 7 | 3 | 31 |
| #12 Leathernecks | 0 | 16 | 3 | 7 | 26 |

=== Northern Iowa ===
| | 1 | 2 | 3 | 4 | Total |
|---|---|---|---|---|---|
| Panthers | 7 | 6 | 7 | 10 | 30 |
| #19 Leathernecks | 0 | 3 | 6 | 14 | 23 |

=== At Southern Illinois ===
| | 1 | 2 | 3 | 4 | Total |
|---|---|---|---|---|---|
| #23 Leathernecks | 3 | 21 | 7 | 3 | 34 |
| Salukis | 14 | 0 | 10 | 20 | 44 |
