= Charlie Fisher (American football) =

American football coach

Biographical details
- Education: Springfield; Eastern Kentucky

Coaching career (HC unless noted)
- 1982: Eastern Kentucky (GA)
- 1983–1984: Ole Miss (GA)
- 1985–1991: Lenoir–Rhyne (OC/QB)
- 1993–1997: West Georgia
- 1998–1999: NC State (WR)
- 2000–2001: Temple (OC/QB)
- 2002–2010: Vanderbilt (off. asst)
- 2011: Miami (OH) (QB)
- 2012–2013: Penn State (QB)
- 2014: Richmond (WR/RC)
- 2015: Richmond (OC)
- 2016–2017: Western Illinois
- 2018–2019: Arizona State (WR)

Head coaching record
- Overall: 50–26
- Tournaments: 0–2 (NCAA D-II playoffs); 0–1 (NCAA D-I playoffs)

Accomplishments and honors

Championships
- 1 GSC (1997)

Charlie Fisher is an American former college football coach. He served as the head football coach at the University of West Georgia from 1993 to 1997 and Western Illinois University from 2016 to 2017. Fisher was the wide receivers coach at Arizona State University from 2018 to 2019.

== Head coaching record ==
Year	Team	Overall	Conference	Standing	Bowl/playoffs	STATS^{#}	FCS^{°}
West Georgia Braves (Gulf South Conference) (1993–1997)
1993	West Georgia	4–6	4–3	T–3rd			
1994	West Georgia	7–3	4–3	4th			
1995	West Georgia	8–3	7–1	2nd	L NCAA Division II First Round		
1996	West Georgia	9–3	5–2	2nd	L NCAA Division II First Round		
1997	West Georgia	8–2	6–1	T–1st			
West Georgia:		36–17	26–10				
Western Illinois Leathernecks (Missouri Valley Football Conference) (2016–2017)
2016	Western Illinois	6–5	3–5	T–6th			
2017	Western Illinois	8–4	5–3	4th	L NCAA Division I First Round	13	12
Western Illinois:		14–9	8–8				
Total:		50–26					
National championship Conference title Conference division title or championship game berth
^{#}Rankings from final The Sports Network poll.; ^{°}Rankings from final FCS Coaches poll.
