= 2016 South Dakota State Jackrabbits football team =

American college football season

2016 South Dakota State Jackrabbits football

MVFC co-champion

FCS Playoffs Quarterfinals, L 10–36 vs. North Dakota State
- Conference: Missouri Valley Football Conference

Ranking
- STATS: No. 6
- FCS Coaches: No. 7
- Record: 9–4 (7–1 MVFC)
- Head coach: John Stiegelmeier (20th season)
- Offensive coordinator: Eric Eidsness (11th season)
- Defensive coordinator: Clint Brown (8th season)
- Home stadium: Dana J. Dykhouse Stadium

2016 Missouri Valley Football Conference standings
| | Conf. | | | Overall |
| Team | W | | L | W | | L |
|---|---|---|---|---|---|---|
| No. 3 North Dakota State +^ | 7 | – | 1 | 12 | – | 2 |
| No. 6 South Dakota State +^ | 7 | – | 1 | 9 | – | 4 |
| No. 2 Youngstown State ^ | 6 | – | 2 | 12 | – | 4 |
| Illinois State ^ | 4 | – | 4 | 6 | – | 6 |
| Northern Iowa | 4 | – | 4 | 5 | – | 6 |
| Western Illinois | 3 | – | 5 | 6 | – | 5 |
| South Dakota | 3 | – | 5 | 4 | – | 7 |
| Indiana State | 2 | – | 6 | 4 | – | 7 |
| Missouri State | 2 | – | 6 | 4 | – | 7 |
| Southern Illinois | 2 | – | 6 | 4 | – | 7 |
+ – Conference co-champions; ^ – FCS playoff participant; Rankings from STATS Poll

The 2016 South Dakota State Jackrabbits football team represented South Dakota State University as a member of the Missouri Valley Football Conference (MVFC) during the 2016 NCAA Division I FCS football season. Led by 20th-year head coach John Stiegelmeier, the Jackrabbits compiled an overall record of 9–4 with a mark of 7–1 in conference play, sharing the MVFC with North Dakota State. Due to their head-to-head victory over North Dakota State during the regular season, South Dakota State received the MVFC's automatic bid to the NCAA Division I Football Championship playoffs, where, after a first-round bye, the Jackrabbits defeated Villanova in the second round, before losing in the quarterfinals in a re-match with North Dakota State. The team played home games on campus at the newly-opened Dana J. Dykhouse Stadium in Brookings, South Dakota.

== Schedule ==
| Date | Time | Opponent | Rank | Site | TV | Result | Attendance |
|---|---|---|---|---|---|---|---|
| September 3 | 7:00 pm | at No. 13 (FBS) TCU* | No. 8 | Amon G. Carter Stadium; Fort Worth, TX | FSN | L 41–59 | 43,450 |
| September 10 | 6:00 pm | Drake* | No. 9 | Dana J. Dykhouse Stadium; Brookings, SD | ESPN3 | W 56–28 | 15,171 (R) |
| September 17 | 6:00 pm | Cal Poly* | No. 9 | Dana J. Dykhouse Stadium; Brookings, SD | ESPN3 | L 31–38 | 16,887 (R) |
| October 1 | 6:00 pm | No. 8 Western Illinois | No. 15 | Dana J. Dykhouse Stadium; Brookings, SD | ESPN3 | W 52–14 | 14,155 |
| October 8 | 6:00 pm | at Southern Illinois | No. 12 | Saluki Stadium; Carbondale, IL | ESPN3 | W 45–39 | 5,704 |
| October 15 | 2:30 pm | at No. 1 North Dakota State | No. 11 | Fargodome; Fargo, ND (Dakota Marker) | NBC ND, ESPN3 | W 19–17 | 18,828 |
| October 22 | 2:00 pm | No. 13 Youngstown State^{†} | No. 7 | Dana J. Dykhouse Stadium; Brookings, SD | Midco SN | W 24–10 | 17,730 (R) |
| October 29 | 2:00 pm | at Illinois State | No. 7 | Hancock Stadium; Normal, IL | CSN CH, ESPN3 | L 21–38 | 7,595 |
| November 5 | 2:00 pm | Missouri State | No. 13 | Dana J. Dykhouse Stadium; Brookings, SD | Midco SN | W 49–24 | 10,826 |
| November 12 | 2:00 pm | South Dakota | No. 11 | Dana J. Dykhouse Stadium; Brookings, SD (rivalry) | Midco SN | W 28–21 | 15,345 |
| November 19 | 4:00 pm | at Northern Iowa | No. 8 | UNI-Dome; Cedar Falls, IA | ESPN3 | W 45–24 | 10,511 |
| December 3 | 2:00 pm | No. 9 Villanova* | No. 7 | Dana J. Dykhouse Stadium; Brookings, SD (NCAA Division Second Round) | ESPN3 | W 10–7 | 6,154 |
| December 10 | 11:00 am | at No. 4 North Dakota State* | No. 7 | Fargodome; Fargo, ND (NCAA Division Quarterfinal) | ESPN | L 10–36** | 18,285 |
*Non-conference game; ^{†}Homecoming; Rankings from STATS Poll released prior to the game; All times are in Central time

- ** Most watched FCS Game of all time - 1.98m viewers on ESPN
- R indicates record attendance

== Game summaries ==
=== @ TCU ===
| | 1 | 2 | 3 | 4 | Total |
|---|---|---|---|---|---|
| #8 Jackrabbits | 3 | 21 | 14 | 3 | 41 |
| #13 (FBS) Horned Frogs | 7 | 17 | 21 | 14 | 59 |

=== Drake ===
| | 1 | 2 | 3 | 4 | Total |
|---|---|---|---|---|---|
| Bulldogs | 0 | 14 | 0 | 14 | 28 |
| #9 Jackrabbits | 21 | 7 | 7 | 21 | 56 |

=== Cal Poly ===
| | 1 | 2 | 3 | 4 | Total |
|---|---|---|---|---|---|
| Mustangs | 7 | 10 | 0 | 21 | 38 |
| #9 Jackrabbits | 7 | 3 | 7 | 14 | 31 |

=== Western Illinois ===
| | 1 | 2 | 3 | 4 | Total |
|---|---|---|---|---|---|
| #8 Leathernecks | 14 | 0 | 0 | 0 | 14 |
| #15 Jackrabbits | 7 | 21 | 24 | 0 | 52 |

=== @ Southern Illinois ===
| | 1 | 2 | 3 | 4 | Total |
|---|---|---|---|---|---|
| #12 Jackrabbits | 14 | 14 | 7 | 10 | 45 |
| Salukis | 7 | 11 | 14 | 7 | 39 |

=== @ North Dakota State ===
| | 1 | 2 | 3 | 4 | Total |
|---|---|---|---|---|---|
| #11 Jackrabbbits | 0 | 3 | 7 | 9 | 19 |
| #1 Bison | 0 | 10 | 7 | 0 | 17 |

=== Youngstown State ===
| | 1 | 2 | 3 | 4 | Total |
|---|---|---|---|---|---|
| #13 Penguins | 3 | 0 | 0 | 7 | 10 |
| #7 Jackrabbits | 14 | 3 | 7 | 0 | 24 |

=== @ Illinois State ===
| | 1 | 2 | 3 | 4 | Total |
|---|---|---|---|---|---|
| #7 Jackrabbits | 0 | 14 | 7 | 0 | 21 |
| Redbirds | 14 | 14 | 0 | 10 | 38 |

=== Missouri State ===
| | 1 | 2 | 3 | 4 | Total |
|---|---|---|---|---|---|
| Bears | 14 | 3 | 0 | 7 | 24 |
| #13 Jackrabbits | 14 | 7 | 21 | 7 | 49 |

=== South Dakota ===
| | 1 | 2 | 3 | 4 | Total |
|---|---|---|---|---|---|
| Coyotes | 0 | 7 | 7 | 7 | 21 |
| #11 Jackrabbits | 7 | 0 | 14 | 7 | 28 |

=== @ Northern Iowa ===
| | 1 | 2 | 3 | 4 | Total |
|---|---|---|---|---|---|
| #8 Jackrabbbits | 14 | 7 | 7 | 17 | 45 |
| Panthers | 14 | 3 | 7 | 0 | 24 |

== FCS Playoffs ==
=== Second Round–Villanova ===
| | 1 | 2 | 3 | 4 | Total |
|---|---|---|---|---|---|
| #9 Wildcats | 0 | 7 | 0 | 0 | 7 |
| #7 Jackrabbits | 7 | 0 | 0 | 3 | 10 |

=== Quarterfinals–North Dakota State ===
| | 1 | 2 | 3 | 4 | Total |
|---|---|---|---|---|---|
| #7 Jackrabbits | 10 | 0 | 0 | 0 | 10 |
| #4 Bison | 7 | 7 | 8 | 14 | 36 |

== Ranking movements ==
Ranking movements Legend: ██ Increase in ranking ██ Decrease in ranking — = Not ranked
| | Week | | | | | | | | | | | | | |
| Poll | Pre | 1 | 2 | 3 | 4 | 5 | 6 | 7 | 8 | 9 | 10 | 11 | 12 | Final |
|---|---|---|---|---|---|---|---|---|---|---|---|---|---|---|
| STATS FCS | 8 | 9 | 9 | 15 | 15 | 12 | 11 | 7 | 7 | 13 | 11 | 8 | 7 | 6 |
| Coaches | 14 | 12 | 10 | 18 | 16 | 15 | 14 | 11 | 10 | 15 | 12 | 10 | 7 | 7 |
| FCS Playoffs | Not released | | | | | | | | | — | — | 10 | Not released | |
