= 2016 North Dakota State Bison football team =

American college football season

2016 North Dakota State Bison football

MVFC co-champion

NCAA Division I Semifinal, L 17–27 vs. James Madison
- Conference: Missouri Valley Football Conference

Ranking
- STATS: No. 3
- FCS Coaches: No. 3
- Record: 12–2 (7–1 MVFC)
- Head coach: Chris Klieman (3rd season)
- Offensive coordinator: Tim Polasek (3rd season)
- Offensive scheme: West Coast
- Defensive coordinator: Matt Entz (3rd season)
- Base defense: 3–4
- Home stadium: Fargodome

2016 Missouri Valley Football Conference standings
	Conf.			Overall
Team	W		L	W		L
No. 3 North Dakota State +^	7	–	1	12	–	2
No. 6 South Dakota State +^	7	–	1	9	–	4
No. 2 Youngstown State ^	6	–	2	12	–	4
Illinois State ^	4	–	4	6	–	6
Northern Iowa	4	–	4	5	–	6
Western Illinois	3	–	5	6	–	5
South Dakota	3	–	5	4	–	7
Indiana State	2	–	6	4	–	7
Missouri State	2	–	6	4	–	7
Southern Illinois	2	–	6	4	–	7
+ – Conference co-champions; ^ – FCS playoff participant; Rankings from STATS Poll

The 2016 North Dakota State Bison football team represented North Dakota State University in the 2016 NCAA Division I FCS football season. They were led by third-year head coach Chris Klieman. The team played their 24th season in the Fargodome, entering the season as the five-time defending national champions and five-time Missouri Valley Football Conference Champions. The Bison have been members of the Missouri Valley Football Conference since the 2008 season.

They were one of very few FCS teams who ever beat a highly ranked FBS team (in this case, No. 13 Iowa). After that win, for four weeks they received votes in the AP's poll of the best football teams in the country (including FBS teams). Their 74 votes in week 3 (barely missing out on a Top 25 ranking) were the most votes ever earned by an FCS program in the AP Poll.

The Bison went 12–2 on the season and won their sixth straight conference title with their lone loss coming on a last-second touchdown versus rival SDSU. The Bison received an at-large bid to the FCS Playoffs where they defeated San Diego and South Dakota State in the second round and quarterfinals before losing to James Madison in the semifinals, ending their five-year championship run.

== Schedule ==
Date	Time	Opponent	Rank	Site	TV	Result	Attendance
August 27	6:30 pm	No. 7 Charleston Southern*	No. 1	Fargodome; Fargo, North Dakota (FCS Kickoff)	ESPN	W 24–17 ^{OT}	18,881
September 10	2:30 pm	No. 8 Eastern Washington*	No. 1	Fargodome; Fargo, North Dakota	NBC ND; ESPN3	W 50–44 ^{OT}	18,906
September 17	11:00 am	at No. 13 (FBS) Iowa*	No. 1	Kinnick Stadium; Iowa City, Iowa	ESPN2	W 23–21	70,585
October 1	1:00 pm	No. 18 Illinois State^{†}	No. 1	Fargodome; Fargo, North Dakota	NBC ND; ESPN3	W 31–10	18,907
October 8	2:00 pm	at Missouri State	No. 1	Robert W. Plaster Stadium; Springfield, Missouri	NBC ND; ESPN3	W 27–3	10,462
October 15	2:30 pm	No. 11 South Dakota State	No. 1	Fargodome; Fargo, North Dakota (Dakota Marker)	NBC ND; ESPN3	L 17–19	18,828
October 22	6:00 pm	at No. 12 Western Illinois	No. 4	Hanson Field; Macomb, Illinois	NBC ND; ESPN3	W 21–13	5,329
October 29	6:00 pm	at Northern Iowa	No. 4	UNI-Dome; Cedar Falls, Iowa	NBC ND; ESPN3	W 24–20	12,032
November 5	2:30 pm	No. 15 Youngstown State	No. 4	Fargodome; Fargo, North Dakota (Harvest Bowl)	NBC ND; ESPN3	W 24–3	18,332
November 12	2:30 pm	Indiana State	No. 4	Fargodome; Fargo, North Dakota	NBC ND; ESPN3	W 41–17	18,276
November 19	2:00 pm	at South Dakota	No. 4	DakotaDome; Vermillion, South Dakota	NBC ND; ESPN3; Midco SN	W 28–21	10,011
December 3	2:30 pm	No. 24 San Diego*	No. 4	Fargodome; Fargo, North Dakota (FCS Playoffs Second Round)	ESPN3	W 45–7	18,305
December 10	11:00 am	No. 7 South Dakota State*	No. 4	Fargodome; Fargo, North Dakota (FCS Playoffs Quarterfinals)	ESPN	W 36–10**	18,285
December 16	7:00 pm	No. 5 James Madison*	No. 4	Fargodome; Fargo, North Dakota (FCS Playoffs Semifinals)	ESPN2	L 17–27	18,282
*Non-conference game; ^{†}Homecoming; Rankings from STATS Poll released prior to the game; All times are in Central time

- Source: STATS Poll
- ** Second-most watched FCS Game of all time – 1.98m viewers on ESPN

== Roster ==
2016 North Dakota State Bison Football
Quarterback: 6 James Hendricks – (redshirt) Freshman; 7 Cole Davis – Junior; 12 Easton Stick – (redshirt) Sophomore; 14 Henry Van Delle – Freshman; Tailback: 8 Bruce Anderson – Sophomore; 10 Lance Dunn – (redshirt) Sophomore; 22 King Frazier – Senior; 24 Demaris Purifoy – (redshirt) Freshman; 25 Chase Morlock – Senior; 28 Ty Brooks – (redshirt) Freshman; 30 Adam Cofield – Freshman; Fullback: 34 Brock Robbins – (redshirt) Freshman; 39 Garrett Malstrom – (redshirt) Freshman; 40 Dan Sargeant – Junior; 41 Zak Kuntz – Freshman; Wide receiver: 1 Cole Jacob – Freshman; 2 Kiwanne Durant – Freshman; 4 Dimitri Williams – Sophomore; 9 Marquise Bridges – (redshirt) Freshman; 13 Eric Perkins – Senior; 15 Daniel Polanski – Junior; 16 RJ Urzendowski – Junior; 18 Khayvon Hawkins – (redshirt) Sophomore; 20 Darrius Shepherd – (redshirt) Sophomore; 31 Bennett RIndy – (redshirt) Freshman; 80 Sean Engel – Freshman; 81 Isaiah Frandsen – Junior; 83 Dallas Freeman – (redshirt) Sophomore; 84 Trevor Heit – Freshman; Tight end: 45 Beau Pauly – Freshman; 46 Braydon Lund – Freshman; 49 Matt Biegler – Freshman; 82 Ben Ellefson – (redshirt) Freshman; 85 Nate Jenson – (redshirt) Sophomore; 86 Jeff Illies – Junior; 87 Connor Wentz – Junior; 88 Matt Anderson – (redshirt) Freshman; 89 Isaac Lashua – (redshirt) Sophomore	Offensive lineman: 54 Dillon Radunz – OT – Freshman; 58 Josh Howieson – OT – Freshman; 59 Karson Schoening – C – Freshman; 60 Max Polson – C – Junior; 63 Zach Kubas – OL – Freshman; 64 Colin Conner – OT – (redshirt) Sophomore; 65 Jack Albrecht – OG – (redshirt) Freshman; 66 Zack Johnson – OG – (redshirt) Senior; 67 Cordell Volson – OT – Freshman; 68 Zack Johnson – OT – (redshirt) Freshman; 70 Jack Plankers – OL – Senior; 71 Luke Bacon – OG – (redshirt) Sophomore; 72 Erik Olson – OT – Junior; 73 Zack Ziemer – OG – Junior; 74 Tanner Volson – C – (redshirt) Sophomore; 75 Austin Kuhnert – C – Junior; 76 Ben Hecht – OG – Freshman; 77 Christian Triplett – C – (redshirt) Sophomore; 78 Landon Lechler – OT – Senior; Defensive tackle: 57 Bryan Carlton – (redshirt) Freshman; 61 Cameron Hackl – Freshman; 62 Bryce Messner – Junior; 63 Aaron Steidl – (redshirt) Sophomore; 66 Quinn Alo – Freshman; 69 Blake Williams – (redshirt) Sophomore; 90 Grant Morgan – Junior; 92 Jack Darnell – (redshirt) Freshman; 95 Connor Hubbs – (redshirt) Freshman; 99 Nate Tanguay – Junior; Defensive end: 53 Cole Karcz – (redshirt) Freshman; 91 Derrek Tuszka – (redshirt) Freshman; 93 Jarrod Tuszka – Junior; 94 Stanley Jones – (redshirt) Sophomore; 95 Caleb Butler – (redshirt) Sophomore; 96 Greg Menard – Junior; 97 Brad Ambrosius – Senior	Linebacker: 1 Chris Board – Junior; 41 MJ Stumpf – Senior; 42 Jabril Cox – Freshman; 43 Kurt Mattox – Junior; 44 Matt Plank – Junior; 45 Levi Jordheim – (redshirt) Sophomore; 47 Pierre Gee-Tucker – Senior; 48 Dan Marlette – (redshirt) Sophomore; 49 Nick DeLuca – Senior; 50 Ross Kennelly – Freshman; 52 Jake Brinkman – (redshirt) Freshman; 55 Aaron Mercadel – (redshirt) Freshman; Defensive backs: 2 Quinten McCoy – CB – Senior; 3 Tre Dempsey – FS – Junior; 5 Robbie Grimsley – SS – Sophomore; 11 Darren Kelley – SS – Junior; 13 Ross Godfrey – CB – Freshman; 17 Felix Dixon – CB – Freshman; 21 Jalen Allison – CB – (redshirt) Sophomore; 23 Jaylaan Wimbush – CB – (redshirt) Sophomore; 26 Keenan Hodenfield – CB – Junior; 27 Isaac Cenescar – SS – (redshirt) Sophomore; 29 Eric Bachmeier – FS – (redshirt) Sophomore; 30 Bryce Bennot – CB – (redshirt) Sophomore; 31 Victor Kizewski – FS – Freshman; 32 Dakota Reid – CB – (redshirt) Sophomore; 33 Moses Nyangacha – SS- Freshman; 35 Dom Davis – CB – (redshirt) Freshman; 37 Tre Fort – CB – (redshirt) Freshman; 38 Jaxon Brown – SS – (redshirt) Freshman; 42 Ross Effertz – CB – (redshirt) Freshman; Placekicker: 21 Garret Wegner – Freshman; 36 Cam Pedersen – Sophomore; Punter: 19 Jackson Koonce – Junior; Long snappers: 51 James Fisher – Junior; 56 Peder Olson – (redshirt) Sophomore (+LB)
* : 2015 NDSU Bison Football Commits (02/04/2015)

=== Recruiting class ===
College recruiting (2016)
Name	Hometown	School	Height	Weight	Commit date
Henry Van Dellen; QB	Plymouth, Minnesota	Providence Academy	6 ft 4 in (1.93 m)	205 lb (93 kg)	February 03, 2016 (Signed)
Henry Van Dellen; QB	Recruit ratings: Scout: 247Sports:				
Adam Cofield; TB	Lee's Summit, Missouri	Blue Springs South High School	5 ft 11 in (1.80 m)	190 lb (86 kg)	February 03, 2016 (Signed)
Adam Cofield; TB	Recruit ratings: No ratings found				
Zak Kuntz; FB	Grand Forks, North Dakota	Red River High School	6 ft 2 in (1.88 m)	251 lb (114 kg)	February 03, 2016 (Signed)
Zak Kuntz; FB	Recruit ratings: No ratings found				
Sean Engel; WR	Chaska, Minnesota	Chaska High School	6 ft 5 in (1.96 m)	200 lb (91 kg)	February 03, 2016 (Signed)
Sean Engel; WR	Recruit ratings: Scout: 247Sports:				
Trevor Heit; WR	Pepin, Wisconsin	Pepin High School	5 ft 9 in (1.75 m)	170 lb (77 kg)	February 03, 2016 (Signed)
Trevor Heit; WR	Recruit ratings: No ratings found				
Cole Jacob; WR	Medina, Minnesota	Medina High School	6 ft 0 in (1.83 m)	177 lb (80 kg)	February 03, 2016 (Signed)
Cole Jacob; WR	Recruit ratings: No ratings found				
Matt Biegler; TE	Underwood, Minnesota	Underwood High School	6 ft 3 in (1.91 m)	256 lb (116 kg)	February 03, 2016 (Signed)
Matt Biegler; TE	Recruit ratings: No ratings found				
Braydon Lund; TE	Minot, North Dakota	Minot High School	6 ft 3 in (1.91 m)	246 lb (112 kg)	February 03, 2016 (Signed)
Braydon Lund; TE	Recruit ratings: Scout: 247Sports:				
Quinn Alo; OL	LaMoure, North Dakota	LaMoure High School	6 ft 2 in (1.88 m)	336 lb (152 kg)	February 03, 2016 (Signed)
Quinn Alo; OL	Recruit ratings: No ratings found				
Ben Hecht; OL	Shawnee, Kansas	Mill Valley High School	6 ft 5 in (1.96 m)	255 lb (116 kg)	February 03, 2016 (Signed)
Ben Hecht; OL	Recruit ratings: Scout: 247Sports:				
Josh Howieson; OL	Baxter, Minnesota	Brainerd High School	6 ft 5 in (1.96 m)	275 lb (125 kg)	February 03, 2016 (Signed)
Josh Howieson; OL	Recruit ratings: No ratings found				
Zach Kubas; OL	Dickinson, North Dakota	Trinity High School	6 ft 4 in (1.93 m)	260 lb (120 kg)	February 03, 2016 (Signed)
Zach Kubas; OL	Recruit ratings: No ratings found				
Dillon Radunz; OL	Becker, Minnesota	Becker High School	6 ft 6 in (1.98 m)	260 lb (120 kg)	February 03, 2016 (Signed)
Dillon Radunz; OL	Recruit ratings: Scout: 247Sports:				
Karson Schoening; OL	Rolla, North Dakota	Mt. Pleasant High School	6 ft 4 in (1.93 m)	320 lb (150 kg)	February 03, 2016 (Signed)
Karson Schoening; OL	Recruit ratings: Scout: 247Sports:				
Cordell Volson; OL	Balfour, North Dakota	Drake High School	6 ft 6 in (1.98 m)	250 lb (110 kg)	February 03, 2016 (Signed)
Cordell Volson; OL	Recruit ratings: Scout: 247Sports:				
Cameron Hackl; DT	Green Bay, Wisconsin	Bay Port High School	6 ft 3 in (1.91 m)	260 lb (120 kg)	February 03, 2016 (Signed)
Cameron Hackl; DT	Recruit ratings: Scout: 247Sports:				
Jabril Cox; LB	Raytown, Missouri	Raytown South High School	6 ft 4 in (1.93 m)	220 lb (100 kg)	February 03, 2016 (Signed)
Jabril Cox; LB	Recruit ratings: No ratings found				
Ross Kennelly; LB	Superior, Wisconsin	Superior High School	5 ft 11 in (1.80 m)	190 lb (86 kg)	February 03, 2016 (Signed)
Ross Kennelly; LB	Recruit ratings: Scout: 247Sports:				
Moses Nyangacha; LB	Robbinsdale, Minnesota	Robbinsdale Cooper High School	5 ft 11 in (1.80 m)	190 lb (86 kg)	February 03, 2016 (Signed)
Moses Nyangacha; LB	Recruit ratings: Scout: 247Sports:				
Beau Pauly; LB	Becker, Minnesota	Becker High School	6 ft 2 in (1.88 m)	207 lb (94 kg)	February 03, 2016 (Signed)
Beau Pauly; LB	Recruit ratings: No ratings found				
Felix Dixon; DB	Clearwater, Florida	Countryside High School	5 ft 11 in (1.80 m)	165 lb (75 kg)	February 03, 2016 (Signed)
Felix Dixon; DB	Recruit ratings: Scout:				
Ross Godfrey; DB	Sioux City, Iowa	Sioux City East High School	5 ft 10 in (1.78 m)	150 lb (68 kg)	February 03, 2016 (Signed)
Ross Godfrey; DB	Recruit ratings: No ratings found				
Victor Kizewski; DB	Stevens Point, Wisconsin	Stevens Point High School	6 ft 0 in (1.83 m)	190 lb (86 kg)	February 03, 2016 (Signed)
Victor Kizewski; DB	Recruit ratings: No ratings found				
Garret Wegner; P	Lodi, Wisconsin	Lodi High School	6 ft 0 in (1.83 m)	177 lb (80 kg)	February 03, 2016 (Signed)
Garret Wegner; P	Recruit ratings: No ratings found				
Darren Kelley; DB	Baltimore, Maryland	North Dakota State College of Science	6 ft 0 in (1.83 m)	192 lb (87 kg)	February 03, 2015 (Transfer)
Darren Kelley; DB	Recruit ratings: Scout:				
Jackson Koonce; P	Oceanside, California	Southern Methodist University	6 ft 1 in (1.85 m)	178 lb (81 kg)	February 03, 2015 (Transfer)
Jackson Koonce; P	Recruit ratings: No ratings found				
Overall recruit ranking: Scout: #- 247Sports: #- ESPN: #-
Note: In many cases, Scout, Rivals, 247Sports, On3, and ESPN may conflict in their listings of height and weight.; In these cases, the average was taken. ESPN grades are on a 100-point scale.; Sources: "2016 Team Ranking". Rivals.com.

== Coaching staff ==
Name	Position	Year at North Dakota State	Alma mater (Year)
Chris Klieman	Head coach	6th	Northern Iowa (1990)
Matt Entz	Defensive coordinator Linebackers	3rd	Wayne State (NE) (1995)
Tim Polasek	Offensive coordinator Running backs	10th	Concordia (WI) (2002)
Atif Austin	Special teams coordinator Wide receiver coach	3rd	Iowa State (2003)
Jamar Cain	Defensive ends coach	3rd	New Mexico State (2002)
Nick Goeser	Defensive tackles coach	7th	Wisconsin–Eau Claire (2003)
Randy Hedberg	Quarterbacks coach	3rd	Minot State (1977)
Joe Klanderman	Defensive backs coach	3rd	Minnesota State Mankato (2001)
Conor Riley	Offensive line coach	4th	Nebraska–Omaha (2002)
Tyler Roehl	Tight ends Fullbacks	3rd	North Dakota State (2009)
Bryan Shepherd	Defensive assistant	1st	North Dakota State (2013)
Jake Otten	Video coordinator	3rd	Cal Poly (2013)

== Game summaries ==
Polls are based on the FCS STATS Poll

=== Charleston Southern ===
	1	2	3	4	OT	Total
#7 Buccaneers	0	3	7	7	0	17
#1 Bison	0	3	7	7	7	24

- (Q2, 9:44) CSU – Jacob Smoak 46 yard field goal – CSU 3–0
- (Q2, 0:00) NDSU – #36 Cam Pedersen 52 yard field goal – TIED 3–3
- (Q3, 13:07) CSU – Mike Holloway 47 yard run (Tyler Tekac kick) – CSU 10–3
- (Q3, 10:02) NDSU – #20 Darrius Shepherd 23 yard pass from #12 Easton Stick (#36 Cam Pedersen kick) – TIED 10–10
- (Q4, 10:34) NDSU – #16 RJ Urzendowski 47 yard pass from #12 Easton Stick (#36 Cam Pedersen kick) – NDSU 17–10
- (Q4, 2:59) CSU – Mike Holloway 6 yard run (Tyler Tekac kick) – TIED 17–17
- (OT) NDSU – #22 King Frazier 25 yard run (#36 Cam Pedersen kick) – NDSU 24–17

=== Eastern Washington ===
	1	2	3	4	OT	Total
#8 Eagles	0	14	10	20	0	44
#1 Bison	7	14	7	16	6	50

- (Q1, 6:19) NDSU – #22 King Frazier 8 yard run (#36 Cam Pedersen kick) – NDSU 7–0
- (Q2, 12:54) EWU – Cooper Kupp 20 yard pass from Gage Gubrud (Roldan Alcobendas kick) – TIED 7–7
- (Q2, 11:01) NDSU – #12 Easton Stick 1 yard run (#36 Cam Pedersen kick) – NDSU 14–7
- (Q2, 6:12) NDSU – #86 Jeff Illies 33 yard pass from #12 Easton Stick (#36 Cam Pedersen kick) – NDSU 21–7
- (Q2, 5:05) EWU – Cooper Kupp 8 yard pass from Gage Gubrud (Roldan Alcobendas kick) – NDSU 21–14
- (Q3, 10:58) EWU – Roldan Alcobendas 37 yard field goal – NDSU 21–17
- (Q3, 7:05) NDSU – #20 Darrius Shepherd 37 yard pass from #12 Easton Stick (#36 Cam Pedersen kick) – NDSU 28–17
- (Q3, 4:06) EWU – Gage Gubrud 13 yard run (Roldan Alcobendas kick) – NDSU 28–24
- (Q4, 14:53) NDSU – #10 Lance Dunn 41 yard run (#36 Cam Pedersen kick) – NDSU 35–24
- (Q4, 12:05) EWU – Nsimba Webster 35 yard pass from Gage Gubrud (Roldan Alcobendas kick) – NDSU 35–31
- (Q4, 9:29) NDSU – #49 Nick DeLuca 40 yard interception return – NDSU 41–31
- (Q4, 7:49) EWU – Stu Stiles 34 yard pass from Gage Gubrud – NDSU 41–37
- (Q3, 4:32) EWU – Tamarick Pierce 1 yard run (Roldan Alcobendas kick) – EWU 44–41
- (Q4, 0:42) NDSU – #36 Cam Pedersen 28 yard field goal – TIED 44–44
- (OT) NDSU – #10 Lance Dunn 25 yard run (#36 Cam Pedersen kick) – NDSU 50–44

=== At Iowa ===
	1	2	3	4	Total
#1 Bison	7	0	7	9	23
#13 (FBS) Hawkeyes	0	14	7	0	21

- (Q1, 2:26) NDSU – #41 MJ Stumpf 21 yard interception return (#36 Cam Pedersen kick) – NDSU 7–0
- (Q2, 13:03) IOWA – Riley McCarron 30 yard pass from C. J. Beathard (Keith Duncan kick) – TIED 7–7
- (Q2, 8:05) IOWA – Matt VandeBerg 14 yard pass from C.J. Beathard (Keith Duncan kick) – IOWA 14–7
- (Q3, 8:06) NDSU – #22 King Frazier 1 yard run (#36 Cam Pedersen kick) – TIED 14–14
- (Q3, 2:12) IOWA – Matt VandeBerg 9 yard pass from C.J. Beathard (Keith Duncan kick) – IOWA 21–14
- (Q4, 3:41) NDSU – #25 Chase Morlock 7 yard pass from #12 Easton Stick – IOWA 21–20
- (Q4, 0:00) NDSU – #36 Cam Pedersen 37 yard field goal – NDSU 23–21

=== Illinois State ===
	1	2	3	4	Total
#18 Redbirds	3	7	0	0	10
#1 Bison	7	21	3	0	31

- (Q1, 8:12) ILST – Sean Slattery 23 yard field goal – ILST 3–0
- (Q1, 1:14) NDSU – #20 Darrius Shepherd 31 yard run (#36 Cam Pedersen kick) – NDSU 7–3
- (Q2, 13:06) ILST – Anthony Fowler 18 yard pass from Jake Kolbe (Sean Slattery kick) – ILST 10–7
- (Q2, 12:48) NDSU – #16 RJ Urzendowski 65 yard pass from #12 Easton Stick (#36 Cam Pedersen kick) – NDSU 14–10
- (Q2, 8:43) NDSU – #10 Lance Dunn 38 yard pass from #12 Easton Stick (#36 Cam Pedersen kick) – NDSU 21–10
- (Q2, 0:27) NDSU – #85 Nate Jenson 35 yard pass from #12 Easton Stick (#36 Cam Pedersen kick) – NDSU 28–10
- (Q3, 0:39) NDSU – #36 Cam Pedersen 47 yard field goal – NDSU 31–10

=== At Missouri State ===
	1	2	3	4	Total
#1 Bison	0	13	0	14	27
Bears	3	0	0	0	3

- (Q1, 9:43) MOST – Zach Drake 50 yard field goal – MOST 3–0
- (Q2, 8:14) NDSU – #36 Cam Pedersen 38 yard field goal – TIED 3–3
- (Q2, 5:45) NDSU – #20 Darrius Shepherd 21 yard pass from #12 Easton Stick (#36 Cam Pedersen kick) – NDSU 10–3
- (Q2, 0:27) NDSU – #36 Cam Pedersen 21 yard field goal – NDSU 13–3
- (Q4, 13:08) NDSU – #22 King Frazier 22 yard run (#36 Cam Pedersen kick) – NDSU 20–3
- (Q4, 4:51) NDSU – #22 King Frazier 4 yard run (#36 Cam Pedersen kick) – NDSU 27–3

=== South Dakota State ===
	1	2	3	4	Total
#11 Jackrabbits	0	3	7	9	19
#1 Bison	0	10	7	0	17

- (Q2, 13:49) NDSU – #12 Easton Stick 1 yard run (#36 Cam Pedersen kick) – NDSU 7–0
- (Q2, 2:13) SDSU – Chase Vinatieri 38 yard field goal – NDSU 7–3
- (Q2, 0:00) NDSU – #36 Cam Pedersen 49 yard field goal – NDSU 10–3
- (Q3, 10:16) NDSU – #12 Easton Stick 26 yard run (#36 Cam Pedersen kick) – NDSU 17–3
- (Q3, 5:26) SDSU – Dallas Goedert 12 yard pass from Taryn Christion (Chase Vinatieri kick) – NDSU 17–10
- (Q4, 11:04) SDSU – Chase Vinatieri 42 yard field goal – NDSU 17–13
- (Q4, 0:01) SDSU – Jake Wieneke 2 yard pass from Taryn Christion – SDSU 19–17

=== At Western Illinois ===
	1	2	3	4	Total
#4 Bison	7	14	0	0	21
#12 Leathernecks	3	3	7	0	13

- (Q1, 10:00) NDSU – #22 King Frazier 3 yard run (#36 Cam Pedersen kick) – NDSU 7–0
- (Q1, 0:19) WIU – Nathan Knuffman 29 yard field goal – NDSU 7–3
- (Q2, 11:16) WIU – Nathan Knuffman 28 yard field goal – NDSU 7–6
- (Q2, 3:25) NDSU – #22 King Frazier 1 yard run (#36 Cam Pedersen kick) – NDSU 14–6
- (Q2, 0:45) NDSU – #86 Jeff Illies 17 yard pass from #12 Easton Stick (#36 Cam Pedersen kick) – NDSU 21–6
- (Q3, 8:56) WIU – Jamie Gilmore 3 yard run (Nathan Knuffman kick) – NDSU 21–13

=== At Northern Iowa ===
	1	2	3	4	Total
#4 Bison	7	7	7	3	24
Panthers	0	3	7	10	20

- (Q1, 4:42) NDSU – #22 King Frazier 1 yard run (#36 Cam Pedersen kick) – NDSU 7–0
- (Q2, 13:12) UNI – Austin Errthum 30 yard field goal – NDSU 7–3
- (Q2, 1:22) NDSU – #86 Jeff Illies 31 yard pass from #12 Easton Stick (#36 Cam Pedersen kick) – NDSU 14–3
- (Q2, 0:00) UNI – Austin Errthum 25 yard field goal – NDSU 14–6
- (Q3, 7:19) NDSU – #25 Chase Morlock 8 yard run (#36 Cam Pedersen kick) – NDSU 21–6
- (Q3, 2:52) UNI – Jaylin James 17 yard pass from Eli Dunne (Austin Errthum kick) – NDSU 21–13
- (Q4, 14:53) NDSU – #36 Cam Pedersen 25 yard field goal – NDSU 24–13
- (Q4, 12:10) UNI – Briley Moore 4 yard pass from Eli Dunne (Austin Errthum kick) – NDSU 24–20

=== Youngstown State ===
	1	2	3	4	Total
#15 Penguins	0	3	0	0	3
#4 Bison	17	0	0	7	24

- (Q1, 7:34) NDSU – #25 Chase Morlock 71 yard run (#36 Cam Pedersen kick) – NDSU 7–0
- (Q1, 3:54) NDSU – #36 Cam Pedersen 36 yard field goal – NDSU 10–0
- (Q1, 1:51) NDSU – #86 Jeff Illies 15 yard pass from #12 Easton Stick (#36 Cam Pedersen kick) – NDSU 17–0
- (Q2, 8:28) YSU – Zak Kennedy 32 yard field goal – NDSU 17–3
- (Q4, 12:39) NDSU – #10 Lance Dunn 7 yard run (#36 Cam Pedersen kick) – NDSU 24–3

=== Indiana State ===
	1	2	3	4	Total
Sycamores	0	7	0	10	17
#4 Bison	21	13	7	0	41

- (Q1, 12:03) NDSU – #20 Darrius Shepherd 84 yard punt return (#36 Cam Pedersen kick) – NDSU 7–0
- (Q1, 6:42) NDSU – #12 Easton Stick 16 yard run (#36 Cam Pedersen kick) – NDSU 14–0
- (Q1, 2:04) NDSU – #12 Easton Stick 42 yard run (#36 Cam Pedersen kick) – NDSU 21–0
- (Q2, 8:23) NDSU – #36 Cam Pedersen 29 yard field goal – NDSU 24–0
- (Q2, 5:09) NDSU – #22 King Frazier 2 yard run (#36 Cam Pedersen kick) – NDSU 31–0
- (Q2, 1:47) ISU – Kelvin Cook 2 yard run (Jerry Nunez kick) – NDSU 31–7
- (Q2, 0:00) NDSU – #36 Cam Pedersen 45 yard field goal – NDSU 34–7
- (Q3, 11:07) NDSU – #10 Lance Dunn 14 yard run (#36 Cam Pedersen kick) – NDSU 41–7
- (Q4, 12:43) ISU – Jerry Nunez 41 yard field goal – NDSU 41–10
- (Q4, 4:52) ISU – Roland Genesy 2 yard run (Jerry Nunez kick) – NDSU 41–17

=== At South Dakota ===
	1	2	3	4	Total
#4 Bison	7	14	7	0	28
Coyotes	7	7	0	7	21

- (Q1, 7:29) NDSU – #22 King Frazier 1 yard run (#36 Cam Pedersen kick) – NDSU 7–0
- (Q1, 3:58) SD – Tacari Carpenter 36 yard pass from Chris Streveler (Miles Bergner kick) – TIED 7–7
- (Q2, 8:42) NDSU – #20 Darrius Shepherd 40 yard pass from #12 Easton Stick (#36 Cam Pedersen kick) – NDSU 14–7
- (Q2, 4:01) SD – Chris Streveler 1 yard run (Miles Bergner kick) – TIED 14–14
- (Q2, 1:01) NDSU – #86 Jeff Illies 13 yard pass from #12 Easton Stick (#36 Cam Pedersen kick) – NDSU 21–14
- (Q3, 11:30) NDSU – #87 Connor Wentz 6 yard pass from #12 Easton Stick (#36 Cam Pedersen kick) – NDSU 28–14
- (Q4, 9:30) SD – Alonge Brooks 12 yard pass from Chris Streveler (Miles Bergner kick) – NDSU 28–21

== FCS Playoffs ==
=== Second Round–San Diego ===
	1	2	3	4	Total
#24 Toreros	0	0	7	0	7
#4 Bison	7	14	7	17	45

- (Q1, 10:49) NDSU – #41 MJ Stumpf 40 yard interception return (#36 Cam Pedersen kick) – NDSU 7–0
- (Q2, 7:11) NDSU – #25 Chase Morlock 16 yard pass from #12 Easton Stick (#36 Cam Pedersen kick) – NDSU 14–0
- (Q2, 0:39) NDSU – #16 RJ Urzendowski 11 yard pass from #12 Easton Stick (#36 Cam Pedersen kick) – NDSU 21–0
- (Q3, 6:56) USD – Ross Dwelley 1 yard pass from Anthony Lawrence (Patrick Murray kick) – NDSU 21–7
- (Q3, 4:48) NDSU – #25 Chase Morlock 49 yard pass from #12 Easton Stick (#36 Cam Pedersen kick) – NDSU 28–7
- (Q4, 10:13) NDSU – #36 Cam Pedersen 31 yard field goal – NDSU 31–7
- (Q4, 11:30) NDSU – #10 Lance Dunn 56 yard run (#36 Cam Pedersen kick) – NDSU 38–7
- (Q4, 9:30) NDSU – #8 Bruce Anderson 61 yard run (#36 Cam Pedersen kick) – NDSU 45–7

=== Quarterfinals–South Dakota State ===
	1	2	3	4	Total
#7 Jackrabbits	10	0	0	0	10
#4 Bison	7	7	8	14	36

- (Q1, 11:16) SDSU – Brady Mengarelli 5 yard run (Chase Vinatieri kick) – SDSU 7–0
- (Q1, 4:33) SDSU – Chase Vinatieri 34 yard field goal – SDSU 10–0
- (Q1, 1:29) NDSU – #10 Lance Dunn 49 yard run (#36 Cam Pedersen kick) – SDSU 10–7
- (Q2, 1:48) NDSU – #12 Easton Stick 3 yard run (#36 Cam Pedersen kick) – NDSU 14–10
- (Q3, 9:13) NDSU – #90 Grant Morgan Safety – NDSU 16–10
- (Q3, 5:27) NDSU – #36 Cam Pedersen 35 yard field goal – NDSU 19–10
- (Q3, 1:29) NDSU – #36 Cam Pedersen 45 yard field goal – NDSU 22–10
- (Q4, 9:57) NDSU – #12 Easton Stick 14 yard run (#36 Cam Pedersen kick) – NDSU 29–10
- (Q4, 7:14) NDSU – #20 Darrius Shepherd 67 yard pass from #12 Easton Stick (#36 Cam Pedersen kick) – NDSU 36–10

=== Semifinals–James Madison ===
	1	2	3	4	Total
#5 Dukes	7	10	0	10	27
#4 Bison	0	7	10	0	17

- (Q1, 1:18) JMU – Jonathan Kloosterman 14 yard pass from Bryan Schor (Tyler Gray kick) – JMU 7–0
- (Q2, 11:59) JMU – Tyler Gray 23 yard field goal – JMU 10–0
- (Q2, 6:51) JMU – Khalid Abdullah 10 yard pass from Bryan Schor (Tyler Gray kick) – JMU 17–0
- (Q2, 1:36) NDSU – #25 Chase Morlock 3 yard run (#36 Cam Pedersen kick) – JMU 17–7
- (Q3, 11:24) NDSU – #36 Cam Pedersen 45 yard field goal – JMU 17–10
- (Q3, 5:53) NDSU – #22 King Frazier 16 yard run (#36 Cam Pedersen kick) – TIED 17–17
- (Q4, 11:46) JMU – Tyler Gray 45 yard field goal – JMU 20–17
- (Q4, 6:59) JMU – John Miller 25 yard pass from Bryan Schor (Tyler Gray kick) – JMU 27–17

== Ranking movements ==
Ranking movements Legend: ██ Increase in ranking ██ Decrease in ranking — = Not ranked RV = Received votes ( ) = First-place votes
	Week													
Poll	Pre	1	2	3	4	5	6	7	8	9	10	11	12	Final
STATS FCS	1 (152)	1 (137)	1 (151)	1 (167)	1 (164)	1 (164)	1 (160)	4 (11)	4 (6)	4 (4)	4 (4)	4 (7)	4 (10)	3
Coaches	1 (25)	1 (23)	1 (24)	1 (26)	1 (26)	1 (26)	1 (26)	4 (1)	4	4 (1)	4 (1)	4 (1)	3 (1)	3
AP Top 25 (FBS)	—	—	—	RV	RV	RV	RV	—	—	—	—	—	—	—
FCS Playoffs	Not released									4	3	1	Not released	
