= 2016 Missouri State Bears football team =

American college football season

2016 Missouri State Bears football
- Conference: Missouri Valley Football Conference
- Record: 4–7 (2–6 MVFC)
- Head coach: Dave Steckel (2nd season)
- Co-offensive coordinators: Sean Coughlin (1st season); Mack Brown (1st season)
- Offensive scheme: Multiple
- Defensive coordinator: Marcus Yokeley (2nd season)
- Base defense: 4–3
- Captains: Dylan Cole; Malik Earl; Riley Shantz
- Home stadium: Robert W. Plaster Stadium

2016 Missouri Valley Football Conference standings
	Conf.			Overall
Team	W		L	W		L
No. 3 North Dakota State +^	7	–	1	12	–	2
No. 6 South Dakota State +^	7	–	1	9	–	4
No. 2 Youngstown State ^	6	–	2	12	–	4
Illinois State ^	4	–	4	6	–	6
Northern Iowa	4	–	4	5	–	6
Western Illinois	3	–	5	6	–	5
South Dakota	3	–	5	4	–	7
Indiana State	2	–	6	4	–	7
Missouri State	2	–	6	4	–	7
Southern Illinois	2	–	6	4	–	7
+ – Conference co-champions; ^ – FCS playoff participant; Rankings from STATS Poll

The 2016 Missouri State Bears football team represented Missouri State University as a member of the Missouri Valley Football Conference (MVFC) during the 2016 NCAA Division I FCS football season. Led by second-year head coach Dave Steckel, the Bears compiled an overall record of 4–7 with a mark of 2–6 in conference play, placing in a three-way tie for eighth at the bottom of the MVFC standings. Missouri State played home games at Robert W. Plaster Stadium in Springfield, Missouri.

== Schedule ==
Date	Time	Opponent	Site	TV	Result	Attendance
September 1	6:00 pm	Southwestern (KS)*	Robert W. Plaster Stadium; Springfield, MO	ESPN3	W 57–0	8,827
September 10	6:00 pm	at Murray State*	Roy Stewart Stadium; Murray, KY	OVCDN	W 28–22	5,063
September 24	6:00 pm	at Kansas State*	Bill Snyder Family Football Stadium; Manhattan, KS	K-StateHD.TV	L 0–35	51,686
October 1	2:00 pm	at No. 24 Indiana State	Memorial Stadium; Terre Haute, IN	ESPN3	W 45–24	6,871
October 8	2:00 pm	No. 1 North Dakota State	Robert W. Plaster Stadium; Springfield, MO	ESPN3	L 3–27	10,462
October 15	2:00 pm	No. 12 Western Illinois^{†}	Robert W. Plaster Stadium; Springfield, MO	ESPN3	L 35–38	12,639
October 22	1:00 pm	at Northern Iowa	UNI-Dome; Cedar Falls, IA	ESPN3	L 7–61	12,014
October 29	2:00 pm	Southern Illinois	Robert W. Plaster Stadium; Springfield, MO	ESPN3	W 38–35	13,487
November 5	2:00 pm	at No. 13 South Dakota State	Dana J. Dykhouse Stadium; Brookings, SD	ESPN3	L 24–49	10,826
November 12	12:00 pm	at Illinois State	Hancock Stadium; Normal, IL	ESPN3	L 0–37	7,144
November 19	2:00 pm	No. 15 Youngstown State	Robert W. Plaster Stadium; Springfield, MO	ESPN3	L 20–65	5,070
*Non-conference game; ^{†}Homecoming; Rankings from STATS Poll released prior to the game; All times are in Central time

== Game summaries ==
=== Southwestern (KS) ===
	1	2	3	4	Total
Moundbuilders	0	0	0	0	0
Bears	21	3	19	14	57

=== At Murray State ===
	1	2	3	4	Total
Bears	7	14	0	7	28
Racers	3	10	6	3	22

=== At Kansas State ===
	1	2	3	4	Total
Bears	0	0			0
Wildcats	14	21			35

Game called at halftime due to weather.

=== At Indiana State ===
	1	2	3	4	Total
Bears	10	14	7	14	45
#24 Sycamores	14	10	0	0	24

=== North Dakota State ===
	1	2	3	4	Total
#1 Bison	0	13	0	14	27
Bears	3	0	0	0	3

=== Western Illinois ===
	1	2	3	4	Total
#12 Leathernecks	10	7	14	7	38
Bears	0	7	7	21	35

=== At Northern Iowa ===
	1	2	3	4	Total
Bears	0	7	0	0	7
Panthers	17	17	20	7	61

=== Southern Illinois ===
	1	2	3	4	Total
Salukis	7	14	7	7	35
Bears	7	0	14	17	38

=== At South Dakota State ===
	1	2	3	4	Total
Bears	14	3	0	7	24
#13 Jackrabbits	14	7	21	7	49

=== At Illinois State ===
	1	2	3	4	Total
Bears	0	0	0	0	0
Redbirds	3	14	17	3	37

=== Youngstown State ===
	1	2	3	4	Total
#15 Penguins	14	20	17	14	65
Bears	0	10	0	10	20
