= Eric Eidsness =

Eric Eidsness may refer to:

- Eric Eidsness (politician) (born 1944), American political figure
- Eric Eidsness (American football), American football coach in the United States
