= 2016 South Dakota Coyotes football team =

American college football season

2016 South Dakota Coyotes football
- Conference: Missouri Valley Football Conference
- Record: 4–7 (3–5 MVFC)
- Head coach: Bob Nielson (1st season)
- Offensive coordinator: Ted Schlafke (1st season)
- Offensive scheme: Pro-style
- Co-defensive coordinators: Atiba Bradley (1st season); Tyler Yelk (1st season)
- Base defense: 4–3
- Home stadium: DakotaDome

2016 Missouri Valley Football Conference standings
	Conf.			Overall
Team	W		L	W		L
No. 3 North Dakota State +^	7	–	1	12	–	2
No. 6 South Dakota State +^	7	–	1	9	–	4
No. 2 Youngstown State ^	6	–	2	12	–	4
Illinois State ^	4	–	4	6	–	6
Northern Iowa	4	–	4	5	–	6
Western Illinois	3	–	5	6	–	5
South Dakota	3	–	5	4	–	7
Indiana State	2	–	6	4	–	7
Missouri State	2	–	6	4	–	7
Southern Illinois	2	–	6	4	–	7
+ – Conference co-champions; ^ – FCS playoff participant; Rankings from STATS Poll

The 2016 South Dakota Coyotes football team represented the University of South Dakota in the 2016 NCAA Division I FCS football season. They were led by first-year head coach Bob Nielson and played their home games in the DakotaDome. They were a member of the Missouri Valley Football Conference. They finished the season 4–7, 3–5 in MVFC play to finish in a tie for sixth place.

== Schedule ==
Date	Time	Opponent	Site	TV	Result	Attendance
September 1	7:00 pm	at New Mexico*	University Stadium; Albuquerque, NM	RTRM	L 21–48	20,221
September 10	2:00 pm	Weber State*	DakotaDome; Vermillion, SD	Midco SN	W 52–49 ^{2OT}	8,114
September 17	4:00 pm	at North Dakota*	Alerus Center; Grand Forks, ND (Potato Bowl, Sitting Bull Trophy)	Midco SN	L 44–47 ^{2OT}	11,477
October 1	3:00 pm	at No. 20 Youngstown State	Stambaugh Stadium; Youngstown, OH	ESPN3	L 20–30	15,151
October 8	2:00 pm	No. 11 Northern Iowa^{†}	DakotaDome; Vermillion, SD	Midco SN	W 28–25	10,221
October 15	2:00 pm	at Indiana State	Memorial Stadium; Terre Haute, IN	ESPN3	W 33–30 ^{2OT}	3,297
October 22	2:00 pm	Illinois State	DakotaDome; Vermillion, SD	ESPN3; MVC TV	W 27–24	7,416
October 29	2:00 pm	No. 13 Western Illinois	DakotaDome; Vermillion, SD	Midco SN	L 34–35	8,412
November 5	2:00 pm	at Southern Illinois	Saluki Stadium; Carbondale, IL	ESPN3; MVC TV	L 28–35	5,689
November 12	2:00 pm	at No. 11 South Dakota State	Dana J. Dykhouse Stadium; Brookings, SD (rivalry)	Midco SN	L 21–28	15,345
November 19	2:00 pm	No. 4 North Dakota State	DakotaDome; Vermillion, SD	Midco SN	L 21–28	10,011
*Non-conference game; ^{†}Homecoming; Rankings from STATS FCS at time of game Poll released prior to the game; All times are in Central time

- Source: Schedule

== Game summaries ==
=== At New Mexico ===
	1	2	3	4	Total
Coyotes	14	0	7	0	21
Lobos	14	21	6	7	48

=== Weber State ===
	1	2	3	4	OT	2OT	Total
Wildcats	28	0	14	0	7	0	49
Coyotes	14	7	0	21	7	3	52

=== At North Dakota ===
	1	2	3	4	OT	2OT	Total
Coyotes	3	24	7	0	7	3	44
Fighting Hawks	7	7	3	17	7	6	47

=== At Youngstown State ===
	1	2	3	4	Total
Coyotes	3	0	3	14	20
#20 Penguins	10	10	0	10	30

=== Northern Iowa ===
	1	2	3	4	Total
#11 Panthers	14	3	0	8	25
Coyotes	14	7	7	0	28

=== At Indiana State ===
	1	2	3	4	OT	2OT	Total
Coyotes	17	0	10	0	3	3	33
Sycamores	10	0	7	10	3	0	30

=== Illinois State ===
	1	2	3	4	Total
Redbirds	7	10	0	7	24
Coyotes	17	7	3	0	27

=== Western Illinois ===
	1	2	3	4	Total
#13 Leathernecks	14	0	14	7	35
Coyotes	17	14	0	3	34

=== At Southern Illinois ===
	1	2	3	4	Total
Coyotes	0	7	7	14	28
Salukis	7	14	7	7	35

=== At South Dakota State ===
	1	2	3	4	Total
Coyotes	0	7	7	7	21
#11 Jackrabbits	7	0	14	7	28

=== North Dakota State ===
	1	2	3	4	Total
#4 Bison	7	14	7	0	28
Coyotes	7	7	0	7	21

== Ranking movements ==
Ranking movements Legend: ██ Increase in ranking ██ Decrease in ranking — = Not ranked RV = Received votes
	Week													
Poll	Pre	1	2	3	4	5	6	7	8	9	10	11	12	Final
STATS FCS	RV	RV	RV	—	—	—	RV	RV	RV	RV	—	—	—	
Coaches	RV	—	RV	—	—	RV	RV	RV	25	RV	—	—	—	
