= 2016 Illinois State Redbirds football team =

American college football season

2016 Illinois State Redbirds football

NCAA Division I First Round, L 24–31 vs. Central Arkansas
- Conference: Missouri Valley Football Conference
- Record: 6–6 (4–4 MVFC)
- Head coach: Brock Spack (8th season)
- Co-offensive coordinators: Dan Clark (1st season); Billy Dicken (1st season)
- Defensive coordinator: Spence Nowinsky (3rd season)
- MVPs: Mark Spelman; Alejandro Rivera; Dalton Keene
- Captains: Mark Spelman; Alec Kocour; Cole Bumpus
- Home stadium: Hancock Stadium

2016 Missouri Valley Football Conference standings
	Conf.			Overall
Team	W		L	W		L
No. 3 North Dakota State +^	7	–	1	12	–	2
No. 6 South Dakota State +^	7	–	1	9	–	4
No. 2 Youngstown State ^	6	–	2	12	–	4
Illinois State ^	4	–	4	6	–	6
Northern Iowa	4	–	4	5	–	6
Western Illinois	3	–	5	6	–	5
South Dakota	3	–	5	4	–	7
Indiana State	2	–	6	4	–	7
Missouri State	2	–	6	4	–	7
Southern Illinois	2	–	6	4	–	7
+ – Conference co-champions; ^ – FCS playoff participant; Rankings from STATS Poll

The 2016 Illinois State Redbirds football team represented Illinois State University as a member of the Missouri Valley Football Conference (MVFC) during the 2016 NCAA Division I FCS football season. Led by eighth-year head coach Brock Spack, the Redbirds compiled an overall record of 6–6 with a mark of 4–4 in conference play, tying for fourth place the MVFC. For the third straight season, Illinois State received an at-large bid to the NCAA Division I Football Championship playoffs, where the Redbirds lost in the first round to Central Arkansas. The team played home games at Hancock Stadium in Normal, Illinois.

== Schedule ==
Date	Time	Opponent	Rank	Site	TV	Result	Attendance
September 3	6:00 pm	Valparaiso*	No. 10	Hancock Stadium; Normal, IL	ESPN3	W 50–13	10,026
September 10	2:30 pm	at Northwestern*	No. 10	Ryan Field; Evanston, IL	BTN	W 9–7	30,748
September 17	2:00 pm	Eastern Illinois*	No. 5	Hancock Stadium; Normal, IL (Mid-America Classic)	CSN CH	L 21–24	13,391
September 24	2:00 pm	Indiana State	No. 9	Memorial Stadium; Terre Haute, IN	ESPN3	L 31–34	6,561
October 1	1:00 pm	at No. 1 North Dakota State	No. 18	Fargodome; Fargo, ND	ESPN3	L 10–31	18,907
October 8	2:00 pm	No. 15 Youngstown State^{†}	No. 23	Hancock Stadium; Normal, IL	CSN CH	L 6–20	12,570
October 15	6:00 pm	Southern Illinois		Hancock Stadium; Normal, IL	CSN CH	W 31–28	10,211
October 22	2:00 pm	at South Dakota		DakotaDome; Vermillion, SD	ESPN3	L 24–27	7,416
October 29	2:00 pm	No. 7 South Dakota State		Hancock Stadium; Normal, IL	CSN CH	W 38–21	7,595
November 5	1:00 pm	at No. 12 Western Illinois		Hanson Field; Macomb, IL	ESPN3	W 31–26	3,589
November 12	12:00 pm	Missouri State		Hancock Stadium; Normal, IL	ESPN3	W 37–0	7,144
November 26	2:00 pm	at No. 14 Central Arkansas*		Estes Stadium; Conway, AR (NCAA Division I First Round)	ESPN3	L 24–31	3,165
*Non-conference game; ^{†}Homecoming; Rankings from STATS Poll released prior to the game; All times are in Central time

== Game summaries ==
=== Valparaiso ===
	1	2	3	4	Total
Crusaders	3	7	0	3	13
#10 Redbirds	7	27	9	7	50

=== @ Northwestern ===
	1	2	3	4	Total
#10 Redbirds	0	6	0	3	9
Wildcats	0	0	0	7	7

The Redbirds beat the Wildcats 9–7. The win came on an Illinois State field goal as time expired. This was ISU's first-ever victory over a Big Ten team.

=== Eastern Illinois ===
	1	2	3	4	Total
Panthers	3	7	7	7	24
#5 Redbirds	0	0	7	14	21

=== @ Indiana State ===
	1	2	3	4	Total
#9 Redbirds	0	7	7	17	31
Sycamores	7	10	7	10	34

=== @ North Dakota State ===
	1	2	3	4	Total
#18 Redbirds	3	7	0	0	10
#1 Bison	7	21	3	0	31

=== Youngstown State ===
	1	2	3	4	Total
#15 Penguins	0	3	0	17	20
#23 Redbirds	0	0	6	0	6

=== Southern Illinois ===
	1	2	3	4	Total
Salukis	10	0	11	7	28
Redbirds	7	7	14	3	31

=== @ South Dakota ===
	1	2	3	4	Total
Redbirds	7	10	0	7	24
Coyotes	17	7	3	0	27

=== South Dakota State ===
	1	2	3	4	Total
#7 Jackrabbits	0	14	7	0	21
Redbirds	14	14	0	10	38

=== @ Western Illinois ===
	1	2	3	4	Total
Redbirds	14	7	7	3	31
#12 Leathernecks	0	16	3	7	26

=== Missouri State ===
	1	2	3	4	Total
Bears	0	0	0	0	0
Redbirds	3	14	17	3	37

=== Central Arkansas—NCAA Division I First Round ===
	1	2	3	4	Total
Redbirds	10	7	0	7	24
#14 Bears	0	7	0	24	31

== Ranking movements ==
Ranking movements Legend: ██ Increase in ranking ██ Decrease in ranking — = Not ranked RV = Received votes
	Week													
Poll	Pre	1	2	3	4	5	6	7	8	9	10	11	12	Final
STATS FCS	10	10	5	9	18	23	RV	RV	RV	RV	RV	RV	RV	
Coaches	8	9	5	12	20	23	RV	RV	—	RV	RV	25	RV	
