= 2016 Northern Iowa Panthers football team =

American college football season

2016 Northern Iowa Panthers football
- Conference: Missouri Valley Football Conference
- Record: 5–6 (4–4 MVFC)
- Head coach: Mark Farley (16th season)
- Co-offensive coordinators: Bill Salmon (16th season); Ryan Mahaffey (1st season)
- Offensive scheme: Multiple
- Defensive coordinator: Jeremiah Johnson (4th season)
- Base defense: 3–4
- Home stadium: UNI-Dome

2016 Missouri Valley Football Conference standings
	Conf.			Overall
Team	W		L	W		L
No. 3 North Dakota State +^	7	–	1	12	–	2
No. 6 South Dakota State +^	7	–	1	9	–	4
No. 2 Youngstown State ^	6	–	2	12	–	4
Illinois State ^	4	–	4	6	–	6
Northern Iowa	4	–	4	5	–	6
Western Illinois	3	–	5	6	–	5
South Dakota	3	–	5	4	–	7
Indiana State	2	–	6	4	–	7
Missouri State	2	–	6	4	–	7
Southern Illinois	2	–	6	4	–	7
+ – Conference co-champions; ^ – FCS playoff participant; Rankings from STATS Poll

The 2016 Northern Iowa Panthers football team represented the University of Northern Iowa as a member of the Missouri Valley Football Conference (MVFC) during the 2016 NCAA Division I FCS football season. Led by 16th-year head coach Mark Farley, the Panthers compiled an overall record of 5–6 with a mark of 4–4 in conference play, tying for fourth place in the MVFC. The team played home games at the UNI-Dome in Cedar Falls, Iowa.

== Schedule ==
Date	Time	Opponent	Rank	Site	TV	Result	Attendance
September 3	7:00 pm	at Iowa State*	No. 5	Jack Trice Stadium; Ames, IA	Cyclones.tv	W 25–20	60,629
September 10	4:00 pm	No. 14 Montana*	No. 3	UNI-Dome; Cedar Falls, IA	PSN, ESPN3	L 14–20	12,346
September 17	6:00 pm	at No. 8 Eastern Washington*	No. 10	Roos Field; Cheney, WA	SWX, CSNC+	L 30–34	9,111
October 1	4:00 pm	Southern Illinois^{†}	No. 12	UNI-Dome; Cedar Falls, IA	PSN, ESPN3	W 42–21	13,710
October 8	2:00 pm	at South Dakota	No. 11	DakotaDome; Vermillion, SD	ESPN3	L 25–28	10,221
October 15	6:00 pm	at No. 14 Youngstown State	No. 21	Stambaugh Stadium; Youngstown, OH	ESPN3	L 10–14	13,373
October 22	1:00 pm	Missouri State		UNI-Dome; Cedar Falls, IA	PSN, ESPN3	W 61–7	12,014
October 29	6:00 pm	No. 4 North Dakota State		UNI-Dome; Cedar Falls, IA	PSN, ESPN3	L 20–24	12,032
November 5	12:00 pm	at Indiana State		Memorial Stadium; Terre Haute, IN	ESPN3	W 39–6	3,409
November 12	1:00 pm	at No. 19 Western Illinois		Hanson Field; Macomb, IL	ESPN3	W 30–23	3,412
November 19	4:00 pm	No. 8 South Dakota State		UNI-Dome; Cedar Falls, IA	ESPN3	L 24–45	10,511
*Non-conference game; ^{†}Homecoming; Rankings from STATS Poll released prior to the game; All times are in Central time

- PSN (CFU Ch. 15/HD415; KCRG-TV Ch. 9.2; WHO-DT Ch. 13.2; KGCW Ch. 26, Comcast SportsNet Chicago)

== Rankings ==
Ranking movements Legend: ██ Increase in ranking ██ Decrease in ranking RV = Received votes т = Tied with team above or below ( ) = First-place votes
	Week													
Poll	Pre	1	2	3	4	5	6	7	8	9	10	11	12	Final
STATS FCS	5	3 (5)	10	14	12	11	21	RV	RV	RV	RV	RV	RV	
Coaches	5	3–T	11	14	12	11	21	RV	RV	RV	RV	RV	RV	

== Game summaries ==
=== At Iowa State ===
	1	2	3	4	Total
#5 Panthers	0	16	3	6	25
Cyclones	7	6	0	7	20

=== Montana ===
	1	2	3	4	Total
#14 Grizzlies	10	10	0	0	20
#3 Panthers	7	0	0	7	14

=== At Eastern Washington ===
	1	2	3	4	Total
#10 Panthers	10	14	0	6	30
#8 Eagles	0	7	14	13	34

=== Southern Illinois ===
	1	2	3	4	Total
Salukis	0	14	7	0	21
#12 Panthers	14	21	0	7	42

=== At South Dakota ===
	1	2	3	4	Total
#11 Panthers	14	3	0	8	25
Coyotes	14	7	7	0	28

=== At Youngstown State ===
	1	2	3	4	Total
#21 Panthers	0	10	0	0	10
#14 Penguins	0	0	0	14	14

=== Missouri State ===
	1	2	3	4	Total
Bears	0	7	0	0	7
Panthers	17	17	20	7	61

=== North Dakota State ===
	1	2	3	4	Total
#4 Bison	7	7	7	3	24
Panthers	0	6	7	7	20

=== At Indiana State ===
	1	2	3	4	Total
Panthers	13	14	6	6	39
Sycamores	0	3	3	0	6

=== At Western Illinois ===
	1	2	3	4	Total
Panthers	7	6	7	10	30
#19 Leathernecks	0	3	6	14	23

=== South Dakota State ===
	1	2	3	4	Total
#8 Jackrabbits	14	7	7	17	45
Panthers	14	3	7	0	24
