= 2016 Indiana State Sycamores football team =

American college football season

2016 Indiana State Sycamores football
- Conference: Missouri Valley Football Conference
- Record: 4–7 (2–6 MVFC)
- Head coach: Mike Sanford Sr. (4th season)
- Offensive coordinator: Brian Sheppard (4th season)
- Defensive coordinator: Brian Cabral (4th season)
- Home stadium: Memorial Stadium

2016 Missouri Valley Football Conference standings
	Conf.			Overall
Team	W		L	W		L
No. 3 North Dakota State +^	7	–	1	12	–	2
No. 6 South Dakota State +^	7	–	1	9	–	4
No. 2 Youngstown State ^	6	–	2	12	–	4
Illinois State ^	4	–	4	6	–	6
Northern Iowa	4	–	4	5	–	6
Western Illinois	3	–	5	6	–	5
South Dakota	3	–	5	4	–	7
Indiana State	2	–	6	4	–	7
Missouri State	2	–	6	4	–	7
Southern Illinois	2	–	6	4	–	7
+ – Conference co-champions; ^ – FCS playoff participant; Rankings from STATS Poll

The 2016 Indiana State Sycamores football team represented Indiana State University as a member of the Missouri Valley Football Conference (MVFC) during the 2016 NCAA Division I FCS football season. Led by Mike Sanford Sr. in his fourth and final season as head coach, the Sycamores compiled an overall record of 4–7 with a mark of 2–6 in conference play, placing in a three-way tie for eighth in the MVFC. Indiana State played home games at Memorial Stadium in Terre Haute, Indiana.

On December 16, Sanford resigned to join the staff at Western Kentucky, where his son, Mike Sanford Jr., had recently been named head coach. He left Indiana State with a four-year record of 18–30.

== Schedule ==
Date	Time	Opponent	Rank	Site	TV	Result	Attendance
September 3	3:00 pm	Butler*		Memorial Stadium; Terre Haute, IN	ESPN3	W 41–25	5,625
September 10	12:00 pm	at Minnesota*		TCF Bank Stadium; Minneapolis, MN	ESPNews	L 28–58	41,026
September 17	7:00 pm	at Southeast Missouri State*		Houck Stadium; Cape Girardeau, MO	OVCDN	W 27–24	7,637
September 24	3:00 pm	No. 9 Illinois State		Memorial Stadium; Terre Haute, IN	ESPN3	W 34–31	6,561
October 1	3:00 pm	Missouri State^{†}	No. 24	Memorial Stadium; Terre Haute, IN	ESPN3	L 24–45	6,871
October 8	4:00 pm	at No. 13 Western Illinois		Hanson Field; Macomb, IL	ESPN3	L 35–36	5,487
October 15	3:00 pm	South Dakota		Memorial Stadium; Terre Haute, IN	ESPN3	L 30–33 ^{2OT}	3,297
October 22	3:00 pm	at Southern Illinois		Saluki Stadium; Carbondale, IL	ESPN3	W 22–14	9,603
October 29	2:00 pm	at Youngstown State		Stambaugh Stadium; Youngstown, OH	ESPN3	L 10–13	15,082
November 5	1:00 pm	Northern Iowa		Memorial Stadium; Terre Haute, IN	ESPN3	L 6–39	3,409
November 12	3:30 pm	at No. 4 North Dakota State		Fargodome; Fargo, ND	ESPN3	L 17–41	18,276
*Non-conference game; ^{†}Homecoming; Rankings from STATS Poll released prior to the game; All times are in Eastern time

== Rankings ==
Ranking movements Legend: ██ Increase in ranking ██ Decrease in ranking — = Not ranked RV = Received votes
	Week													
Poll	Pre	1	2	3	4	5	6	7	8	9	10	11	12	Final
STATS FCS	RV	RV	—	RV	24	RV	RV	—	—	—	—	—	—	—
Coaches	—	RV	—	—	RV	—	—	—	—	—	—	—	—	—

== Game summaries ==
=== Butler ===
	1	2	3	4	Total
Bulldogs	0	6	6	13	25
Sycamores	14	3	21	3	41

=== At Minnesota ===
	1	2	3	4	Total
Sycamores	7	0	14	7	28
Golden Gophers	14	24	10	10	58

=== At Southeast Missouri State ===
	1	2	3	4	Total
Sycamores	7	3	3	14	27
Redhawks	7	3	7	7	24

=== Illinois State ===
	1	2	3	4	Total
#9 Redbirds	0	7	7	17	31
Sycamores	7	10	7	10	34

=== Missouri State ===
	1	2	3	4	Total
Bears	10	14	7	14	45
#24 Sycamores	14	10	0	0	24

=== At Western Illinois ===
	1	2	3	4	Total
Sycamores	7	7	21	0	35
#13 Leathernecks	0	20	7	9	36

=== South Dakota ===
	1	2	3	4	OT	2OT	Total
Coyotes	17	0	10	0	3	3	33
Sycamores	10	0	7	10	3	0	30

=== At Southern Illinois ===
	1	2	3	4	Total
Sycamores	3	7	6	6	22
Salukis	7	0	0	7	14

=== At Youngstown State ===
	1	2	3	4	Total
Sycamores	10	0	0	0	10
Penguins	0	6	0	7	13

=== Northern Iowa ===
	1	2	3	4	Total
Panthers	13	14	6	6	39
Sycamores	0	3	3	0	6

=== At North Dakota State ===
	1	2	3	4	Total
Sycamores	0	7	0	10	17
#4 Bison	21	13	7	0	41
