= 2016 Southern Illinois Salukis football team =

American college football season

2016 Southern Illinois Salukis football
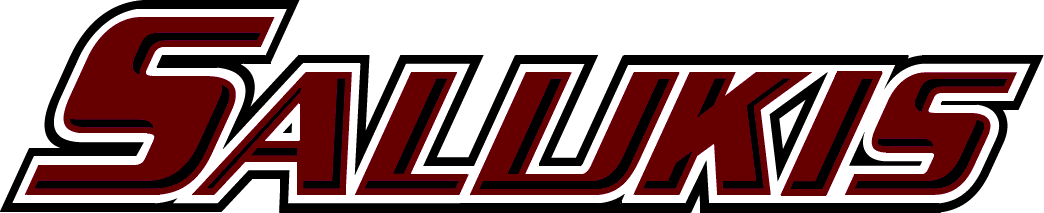
- Conference: Missouri Valley Football Conference
- Record: 4–7 (2–6 MVFC)
- Head coach: Nick Hill (1st season)
- Offensive coordinator: John Van Dam (1st season)
- Defensive coordinator: Kraig Paulson (1st season)
- Home stadium: Saluki Stadium

2016 Missouri Valley Football Conference standings
	Conf.			Overall
Team	W		L	W		L
No. 3 North Dakota State +^	7	–	1	12	–	2
No. 6 South Dakota State +^	7	–	1	9	–	4
No. 2 Youngstown State ^	6	–	2	12	–	4
Illinois State ^	4	–	4	6	–	6
Northern Iowa	4	–	4	5	–	6
Western Illinois	3	–	5	6	–	5
South Dakota	3	–	5	4	–	7
Indiana State	2	–	6	4	–	7
Missouri State	2	–	6	4	–	7
Southern Illinois	2	–	6	4	–	7
+ – Conference co-champions; ^ – FCS playoff participant; Rankings from STATS Poll

The 2016 Southern Illinois Salukis football team represented Southern Illinois University Carbondale as a member of the Missouri Valley Football Conference (MVFC) during the 2016 NCAA Division I FCS football season. Led by first-year head coach Nick Hill, the Salukis compiled an overall record of 4–7 with a mark of 2–6 in conference play, placing in a three-way tie for eighth in the MVFC. Southern Illinois played home games at Saluki Stadium in Carbondale, Illinois.

== Schedule ==
Date	Time	Opponent	Site	TV	Result	Attendance
September 3	5:00 pm	at Florida Atlantic*	FAU Stadium; Boca Raton, FL	CUSA.tv	L 30–38	14,887
September 10	6:00 pm	Southeast Missouri State*	Saluki Stadium; Carbondale, IL		W 30–22	10,003
September 17	6:00 pm	Murray State*	Saluki Stadium; Carbondale, IL	ESPN3	W 50–17	11,150
October 1	4:00 pm	at No. 12 Northern Iowa	UNI-Dome; Cedar Falls, IA	CSN Chicago; ESPN3	L 21–42	13,710
October 8	6:00 pm	No. 12 South Dakota State	Saluki Stadium; Carbondale, IL	ESPN3	L 39–45	5,704
October 15	6:00 pm	at Illinois State	Hancock Stadium; Normal, IL	CSN Chicago	L 28–31	10,211
October 22	2:00 pm	Indiana State^{†}	Saluki Stadium; Carbondale, IL	ESPN3	L 14–22	9,603
October 29	2:00 pm	at Missouri State	Robert W. Plaster Stadium; Springfield, MO	ESPN3	L 35–38	13,487
November 5	2:00 pm	South Dakota	Saluki Stadium; Carbondale, IL	ESPN3	W 35–28	5,689
November 12	11:00 am	at No. 17 Youngstown State	Stambaugh Stadium; Youngstown, OH	ESPN3	L 14–21	11,262
November 19	2:00 pm	No. 23 Western Illinois	Saluki Stadium; Carbondale, IL	ESPN3	W 44–34	5,362
*Non-conference game; ^{†}Homecoming; Rankings from STATS Poll released prior to the game; All times are in Central time

== Game summaries ==
=== At Florida Atlantic ===
	1	2	3	4	Total
Salukis	14	10	0	6	30
Owls	14	7	14	3	38

=== Southeast Missouri State ===
	1	2	3	4	Total
Redhawks	6	3	0	13	22
Salukis	3	7	17	3	30

=== Murray State ===
	1	2	3	4	Total
Racers	10	0	0	7	17
Salukis	24	14	6	6	50

=== At Northern Iowa ===
	1	2	3	4	Total
Salukis	0	14	7	0	21
#12 Panthers	14	21	0	7	42

=== South Dakota State ===
	1	2	3	4	Total
#12 Jackrabbits	14	14	7	10	45
Salukis	7	11	14	7	39

=== At Illinois State ===
	1	2	3	4	Total
Salukis	10	0	11	7	28
Redbirds	7	7	14	3	31

=== Indiana State ===
	1	2	3	4	Total
Sycamores	3	7	6	6	22
Salukis	7	0	0	7	14

=== At Missouri State ===
	1	2	3	4	Total
Salukis	7	14	7	7	35
Bears	7	0	14	17	38

=== South Dakota ===
	1	2	3	4	Total
Coyotes	0	7	7	14	28
Salukis	7	14	7	7	35

=== At Youngstown State ===
	1	2	3	4	Total
Salukis	0	0	7	7	14
#17 Penguins	7	7	0	7	21

=== Western Illinois ===
	1	2	3	4	Total
#23 Leathernecks	3	21	7	3	34
Salukis	14	0	10	20	44
