= Eric Eidsness (American football) =

American football coach

Current position
- Title: Offensive coordinator & quarterbacks coach
- Team: South Dakota State
- Conference: MVFC

Playing career
- 1988: St. Cloud State
- 1989–1991: Sioux Falls
- 1992–1993: Robinson Sphinx France
- Positions: Wide receiver, quarterback

Coaching career (HC unless noted)
- 1992: Morningside (QB/WR)
- 1993: South Dakota State (WR)
- 1994–1995: Morningside (QB/WR)
- 1996–1997: South Dakota State (WR)
- 1998: Ferris State (OC/ST)
- 1999–2003: South Dakota State (OC)
- 2004–2009: Southwest Minnesota State
- 2010: South Dakota State (QB/PGC)
- 2011–2014: South Dakota State (OC/QB)
- 2015–2018: South Dakota State (AHC/OC/QB)
- 2019–2024: Northern Illinois (OC/QB)
- 2025–present: South Dakota State (OC/QB)

Head coaching record
- Overall: 26–40

Eric Eidsness is an American football coach and former player. He is the offensive coordinator and quarterbacks coach at South Dakota State University. Eidsness was the head football coach at Southwest Minnesota State University in Marshall, Minnesota for six seasons, from 2004 to 2009, compiling a record of 26–40. After leaving Southwest Minnesota State he was appointed assistant coach for quarterbacks and receivers at South Dakota State University.

== Playing career ==
Eidsness played college football at the University of Sioux Falls, starring at quarterback and wide receiver.Eidsness is 10th all time in USF history in passing yards (as of 2013), recording 2650 yards from 1989-1991. Eric also contributed 15 touchdowns on a 40.1% completion percentage. He also played two professional seasons 1992–1993 in France Ligue Élite de Football Américain (D1 Elite League), where he also started his coaching career.

== Head coaching record ==
| Year | Team | Overall | Conference | Standing | Bowl/playoffs |
|---|---|---|---|---|---|
Southwest Minnesota State Mustangs (Northern Sun Intercollegiate Conference) (2004–2009)
| 2004 | Southwest Minnesota State | 5–6 | 3–4 | 5th | |
| 2005 | Southwest Minnesota State | 4–7 | 1–6 | T–6th | |
| 2006 | Southwest Minnesota State | 4–7 | 3–5 | T–6th | |
| 2007 | Southwest Minnesota State | 2–9 | 2–7 | T–8th | |
| 2008 | Southwest Minnesota State | 6–5 | 6–4 / 3–3 | T–6th / T–4th (South) | |
| 2009 | Southwest Minnesota State | 5–6 | 4–6 / 1–5 | 9th / 6th (South) | |
| Southwest Minnesota State: | | 26–40 | 19–32 | | |
| Total: | | 26–40 | | | |

== Coaching Career ==
In 1992, Eidsness started his coaching overseas in Paris, France, as an assistant coach for one year and then head coach the following year. When he returned to the U.S., he coached quarterbacks and receivers at Morningside College (94-95), then as a graduate assistant at South Dakota State University (96-97), then as an offensive coordinator at Ferris State (98). Eric returned to SDSU in 1999 as an offensive coordinator and served until 2003, when he was a finalist for the AFCA Division II Assistant Coach of the Year award. In the same year, he went to Southwest Minnesota State University and led as head coach from 2004 to 2009. He returned to SDSU in 2010 as the quarterbacks coach and passing game coordinator, and after the 2011 season, Eidsness was promoted to offensive coordinator; in 2015, he was promoted again to associate head coach. Eric guided quarterbacks Taryn Christion and Austin Sumner as they broke a multitude of SDSU passing records. Eidsness was then hired by Northern Illinois University’s Thomas Hammock, serving as offensive coordinator and quarterbacks coach until he returned to SDSU in 2025 as offensive coordinator.

== Family and Education ==
Eric and his wife Brandy are accompanied by their 5 children, Eil, Otto, Isla, Olive, and the late Audrey Rose. Eric graduated from Sioux Falls Lincoln High School in the class of 1988 and graduated from the University of Sioux Falls in 1992 with a bachelor's degree in health/physical education.
