= Jonah Hodges =

American football player (born 1993)

Profile
- Position: Running back

Personal information
- Born: October 24, 1993 (age 33); San Francisco, California, U.S.
- Listed height: 5 ft 9 1/2 in (1.77 m)
- Listed weight: 191 lb (87 kg)

Career information
- High school: Santa Cruz
- College: California (2013); San Diego (2014–2016)
- NFL draft: 2017: undrafted

Career history
- Montreal Alouettes (2017)*
- * Offseason or practice squad member only

Awards and highlights
- First-team All-Pioneer Football League (2014)

Jonah Hodges is an American former college football running back. He played for the California Golden Bears football in 2014 and the University of San Diego from 2014 to 2016. During the 2014 season, he rushed for over 1,200 yards, totaled over 1,700 all-purpose yards, and set a San Diego Toreros football record with 275 rushing yards in a game. He was selected as a first-team All-Pioneer Football League player in 2014.

== College career ==
=== University of California, Berkeley ===
Hodges started his collegiate career playing for the University of California from 2012 to 2013. He was redshirted as a freshman, but during the next season he played in two home games, one against Oregon State and one against USC. In the game against USC he rushed four times, totaling 31 yards. After the 2013 season, he was granted permission to contact other Universities in regards to transferring for the coming season.

=== University of San Diego ===
As a second-year player, he was a running back and he had 12 starts. In those 12 starts, Hodges carried the ball for 1,214 yards. With those 1,214 yards, he carried the ball 221 times and recorded six touchdowns. During the 2014 season, he was named All-PFL (Pioneer Football League) first team, USD's Offensive MVP, and USD's Strength Coach Award. He also made the 2014 PFL Honor Roll. Jonah Hodges also set the University of San Diego's record for single game rushing yards at 273 yards. In the 2015 season, he was named to the 2015 All-PFL Preseason First Team.

== Professional career ==
After going undrafted in the 2017 NFL draft, Hodges was invited to rookie minicamp on a tryout basis with the Detroit Lions. He signed a two-year contract with the Montreal Alouettes of the Canadian Football League on May 27, 2017. He was released on June 17, 2017.
