= Taryn Christion =

American football player (born 1997)

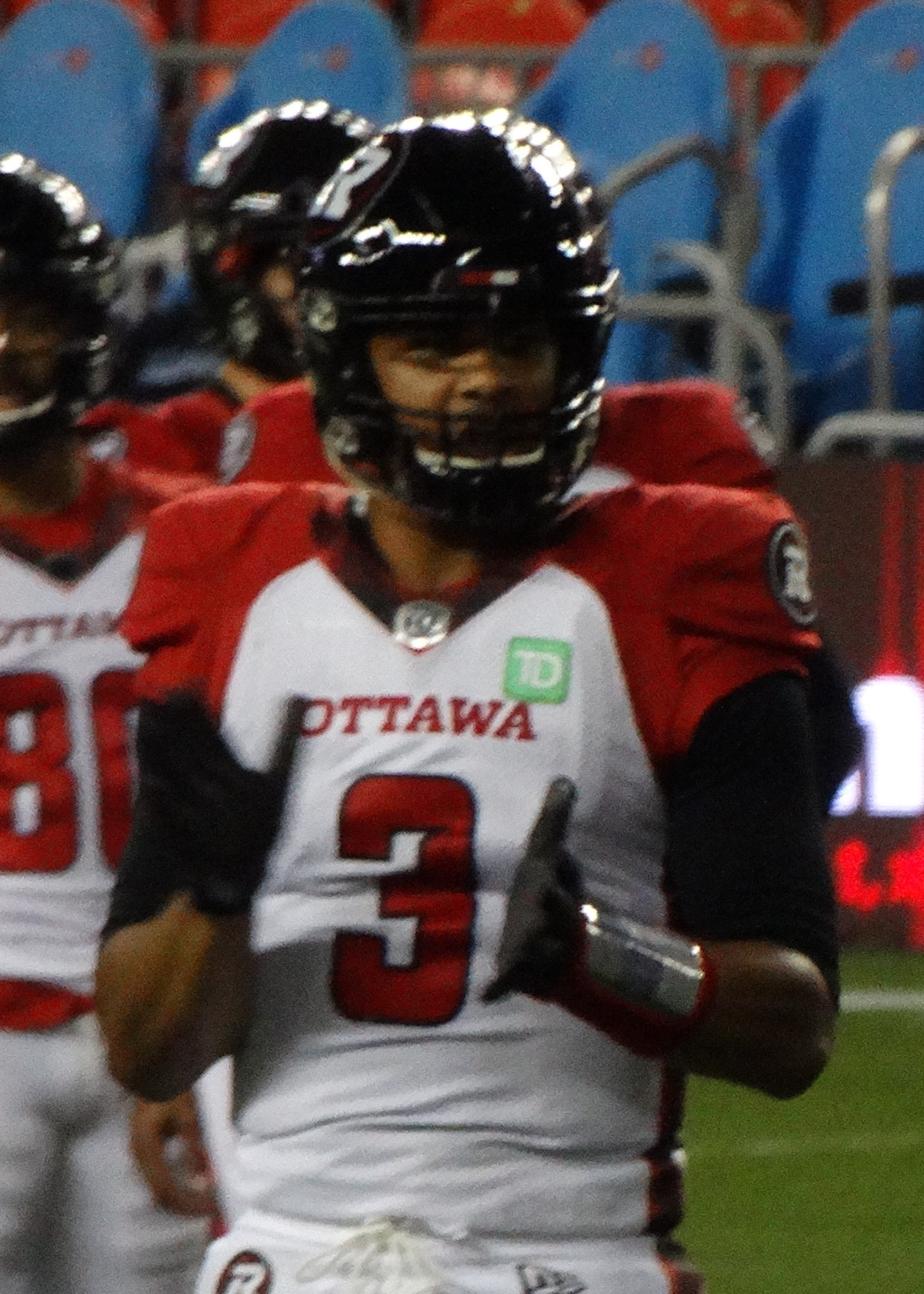
- Christion with the Ottawa Redblacks in 2021

No. 3
- Position: Quarterback

Personal information
- Born: February 6, 1997 (age 29)
- Listed height: 6 ft 2 in (1.88 m)
- Listed weight: 218 lb (99 kg)

Career information
- High school: Roosevelt (Sioux Falls, South Dakota)
- College: South Dakota State

Career history
- 2019: Seattle Seahawks*
- 2019: Dallas Cowboys*
- 2019: Pittsburgh Steelers*
- 2020–2021: Ottawa Redblacks
- * Offseason or practice squad member only

Awards and highlights
- MVFC Offensive Player of the Year (2016); 2× First-team All-MVFC (2016, 2018); Second-team All-MVFC (2017)

Career CFL statistics
- TD–INT: 0–0
- Yards: 20
- Comp-Att: 2–6
- Rushing yards: 37
- Stats at CFL.ca

Taryn Christion (born February 6, 1997) is an American former professional football player who was a quarterback for the Ottawa Redblacks of the Canadian Football League (CFL). He played college football for the South Dakota State Jackrabbits.

== College career ==
Christion played for the South Dakota State Jackrabbits for four seasons. Christion finished his collegiate career with school records of 11,535 passing yards, 104 touchdown passes, 13,050 yard of total offense, 814 pass completions, and 1,363 pass attempts.

== Professional career ==
=== Seattle Seahawks ===
Christion was signed by the Seattle Seahawks as an undrafted free agent on April 28, 2019. He was waived by the Seahawks on May 14, 2019.

=== Dallas Cowboys ===
Christion was signed by the Dallas Cowboys on July 24, 2019. He was waived during final roster cuts on August 31, 2019.

=== Pittsburgh Steelers ===
Christion was signed by the Pittsburgh Steelers to their practice squad on October 2, 2019. He was signed specifically to imitate Baltimore Ravens quarterback Lamar Jackson in practice. Christion was released on October 7, 2019.

=== Ottawa Redblacks ===
Christion was signed by Ottawa Redblacks of the Canadian Football League on January 21, 2020. He announced his retirement on May 7, 2022.
