= Dana J. Dykhouse Stadium =

Football stadium in Brookings, South Dakota, U.S.

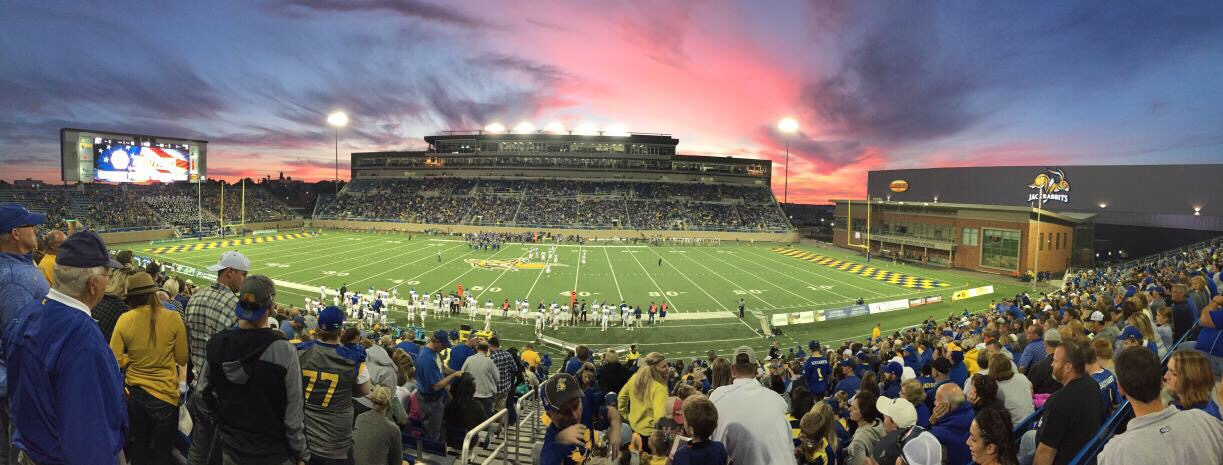
- View from east in 2016

- Location in the United States Location in South Dakota
- Interactive map of Dana J. Dykhouse Stadium
- Address: 1396 Stadium Road
- Location: South Dakota State University; Brookings, South Dakota, U.S.
- Coordinates: 44.321°N 96.780°W
- Elevation: 1,620 feet (495 m) AMSL.
- Owner: South Dakota State University
- Operator: South Dakota State University
- Capacity: 19,340
- Surface: AstroTurf
- Record attendance: 19,477 – October 25, 2025 vs. North Dakota State

Construction
- Groundbreaking: 2014
- Opened: 2016; 10 years ago
- Cost: $65 million

Tenants
- South Dakota State Jackrabbits (NCAA) (2016–present); Brookings High School Bobcats (SDHSAA) (2016–present)

The Dana J. Dykhouse Stadium is an outdoor college football stadium in the north central United States, on the campus of South Dakota State University in Brookings, South Dakota. It is the home venue of the South Dakota State Jackrabbits of the Missouri Valley Football Conference. The stadium was constructed in phases on the previous Coughlin-Alumni Stadium site and has a seating capacity of 19,340. The field has a traditional north-south alignment at an approximate elevation of 1,620 feet (495 m) above sea level.

It was funded through private gifts and long-term revenue streams, including expanded club seats, loge boxes, and a premium suite level. Lead gifts totaling $12.5 million from Sioux Falls banker Dana Dykhouse and philanthropist T. Denny Sanford were announced in October 2013 and the stadium opened in 2016.

The stadium project was approved by the state legislature during the 2014 session and signed into law by Governor Dennis Daugaard. Construction began in the fall of 2014 with the east and south stands completed in August 2015; the remainder of the project was finished by the next football season in August 2016.

== History ==
The opening event at the stadium in 2016 was the Jacks Bash concert, which featured country music artists Lee Brice, Little Big Town, and Luke Bryan on September 8. Two days later, the football team opened up the stadium with a 56–28 win over the Drake Bulldogs. SDSU posted a 6–1 record at home during the 2016 season, including a playoff win over the Villanova Wildcats.

South Dakota State posted a 30–5 (.857) record at the stadium in its first five seasons.

== Attendance records ==
Rank	Attendance	Date	Game Result
1	19,477	October 25, 2025	2 South Dakota State 7, 1 North Dakota State 38
2	19,431	November 4, 2023	1 South Dakota State 33, 11 North Dakota State 16
3	19,376	September 14, 2024	1 South Dakota State 24, Augustana 3
4	19,371	October 26, 2019	3 South Dakota State 16, 1 North Dakota State 23
5	19,357	October 14, 2023	1 South Dakota State 41, Northern Iowa 6
6	19,351	October 26, 2024	3 South Dakota State 20, 4 South Dakota 17
7	19,332	October 8, 2022	2 South Dakota State 28, South Dakota 3
8	19,332	September 9, 2023	1 South Dakota State 20, 3 Montana State 16
9	19,331	October 12, 2024	1 South Dakota State 63, Youngstown State 13
10	19,321	September 7, 2024	1 South Dakota State 45, 12 Incarnate Word 24

== Student Section ==
The Student section for South Dakota State sits on the south end of the stadium with the band centered in the middle. The student section often fills the end zone and helps to create a loud environment inside of Dana J Dykhouse Stadium. On August 31, 2017, South Dakota State broke a student attendance record when 4,251 students packed the stands against Duquesne in the stadiums first ever Thursday night game. South Dakota State won the game 51-14.

South Dakota State's student section has an official student organization called the Barnyard Cadets. This group organizes a student gathering on campus before each Jackrabbit home game before the whole student body walks toward the stadium from the south.

== See also ==
- List of NCAA Division I FCS football stadiums
