= 2016 Central Connecticut Blue Devils football team =

American college football season

2016 Central Connecticut Blue Devils football
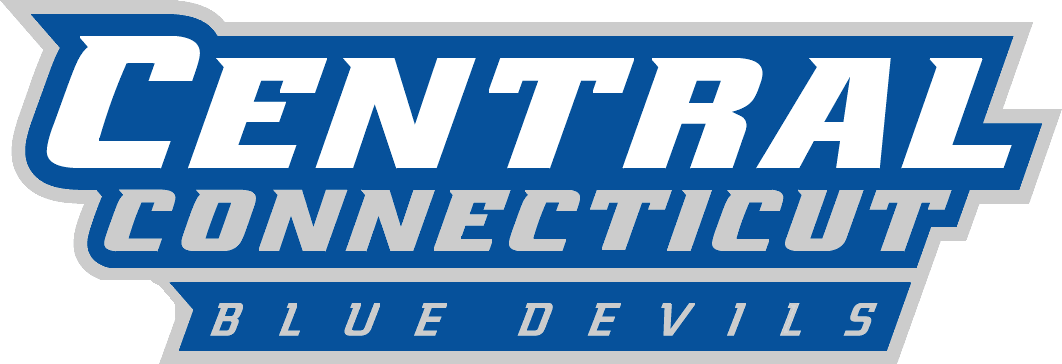
- Conference: Northeast Conference
- Record: 2–9 (1–5 NEC)
- Head coach: Pete Rossomando (3rd season)
- Offensive coordinator: Ryan McCarthy
- Defensive coordinator: Andrew Christ
- Home stadium: Arute Field

2016 Northeast Conference football standings
	Conf.			Overall
Team	W		L	W		L
Duquesne +	5	–	1	8	–	3
Saint Francis (PA) +^	5	–	1	7	–	5
Wagner	4	–	2	6	–	5
Bryant	4	–	2	5	–	6
Sacred Heart	1	–	5	6	–	5
Central Connecticut	1	–	5	2	–	9
Robert Morris	1	–	5	2	–	9
+ – Conference co-champions; ^ – FCS playoff participant

The 2016 Central Connecticut Blue Devils football team represented Central Connecticut State University in the 2016 NCAA Division I FCS football season. The team was led by third-year head coach Pete Rossomando and played their home games at Arute Field. They were a member of the Northeast Conference. They finished with a record of 2–9, 1–5 in NEC play, to finish in a three-way tie for fifth place.

== Schedule ==
Date	Time	Opponent	Site	TV	Result	Attendance
September 2	6:00 p.m.	Lafayette*	Arute Field; New Britain, CT	NECFR	L 10–24	4,117
September 10	6:00 p.m.	at No. 12 James Madison*	Bridgeforth Stadium; Harrisonburg, VA	MadiZone	L 21–56	20,636
September 17	3:00 p.m.	Bowie State*	Arute Field; New Britain, CT	NECFR	W 44–35	2,717
September 24	1:00 p.m.	at Bryant	Beirne Stadium; Smithfield, RI	ESPN3	L 25–45	4,514
October 8	1:00 p.m.	at Penn*	Franklin Field; Philadelphia, PA	ILDN	L 16–28	3,115
October 15	1:00 p.m.	Wagner^{†}	Arute Field; New Britain, CT	ESPN3	L 21–25	3,826
October 22	2:00 p.m.	at No. T–17 Coastal Carolina*	Brooks Stadium; Conway, SC	CSN	L 25–33	9,217
October 29	Noon	at Robert Morris	Joe Walton Stadium; Moon Township, PA	NECFR	L 6–19	1,918
November 5	Noon	Sacred Heart	Arute Field; New Britain, CT	NECFR	W 37–35	2,217
November 12	Noon	at Saint Francis (PA)	DeGol Field; Loretto, PA	ESPN3	L 21–31	1,621
November 19	Noon	Duquesne	Arute Field; New Britain, CT	NECFR	L 19–52	1,849
*Non-conference game; ^{†}Homecoming; Rankings from STATS Poll released prior to the game; All times are in Eastern time

== Game summaries ==
=== Lafayette ===
	1	2	3	4	Total
Leopards	10	0	0	14	24
Blue Devils	0	3	7	0	10

=== At James Madison ===
	1	2	3	4	Total
Blue Devils	0	7	14	0	21
#12 Dukes	21	14	7	14	56

=== Bowie State ===
	1	2	3	4	Total
Bulldogs	7	7	7	14	35
Blue Devils	7	10	13	14	44

=== At Bryant ===
	1	2	3	4	Total
Blue Devils	3	0	8	14	25
Bulldogs	7	21	10	7	45

=== At Penn ===
	1	2	3	4	Total
Blue Devils	0	10	3	3	16
Quakers	14	7	7	0	28

=== Wagner ===
	1	2	3	4	Total
Seahawks	7	3	0	15	25
Blue Devils	0	21	0	0	21

=== At Coastal Carolina ===
	1	2	3	4	Total
Blue Devils	0	3	7	15	25
#17–T Chanticleers	7	16	3	7	33

=== At Robert Morris ===
	1	2	3	4	Total
Blue Devils	0	0	0	6	6
Colonials	2	7	3	7	19

=== Sacred Heart ===
	1	2	3	4	Total
Pioneers	7	0	14	14	35
Blue Devils	7	10	14	6	37

=== At Saint Francis (PA) ===
	1	2	3	4	Total
Blue Devils	7	7	0	7	21
Red Flash	17	7	7	0	31

=== Duquesne ===
	1	2	3	4	Total
Dukes	21	10	7	14	52
Blue Devils	3	16	0	0	19
