= 2016 Valparaiso Crusaders football team =

American college football season

2016 Valparaiso Crusaders football
- Conference: Pioneer Football League
- Record: 4–7 (3–5 PFL)
- Head coach: Dave Cecchini (3rd season)
- Offensive coordinator: Jason Miran (3rd season)
- Defensive coordinator: Ernest Moore (3rd season)
- Home stadium: Brown Field

2016 Pioneer Football League standings
	Conf.			Overall
Team	W		L	W		L
No. 19 San Diego $^	8	–	0	10	–	2
Dayton	7	–	1	9	–	2
Drake	6	–	2	7	–	4
Marist	5	–	3	5	–	6
Jacksonville	4	–	3	5	–	5
Campbell	3	–	4	5	–	5
Morehead State	3	–	5	4	–	7
Valparaiso	3	–	5	4	–	7
Butler	2	–	6	4	–	7
Stetson	2	–	6	4	–	7
Davidson	0	–	8	2	–	9
$ – Conference champion; ^ – FCS playoff participant; Rankings from STATS Poll

The 2016 Valparaiso Crusaders football team represented Valparaiso University in the 2016 NCAA Division I FCS football season. They were led by third-year head coach Dave Cecchini and played their home games at Brown Field. They were members of the Pioneer Football League. They finished the season 4–7, 3–5 in PFL play to finish in a two-way tie for seventh place.

== Schedule ==
Date	Time	Opponent	Site	TV	Result	Attendance
September 3	6:00 pm	at No. 10 Illinois State*	Hancock Stadium; Normal, IL	ESPN3	L 13–50	10,026
September 10	12:00 pm	at Sacred Heart*	Campus Field; Fairfield, CT	NECFR	L 14–42	2,406
September 17	1:00 pm	Trinity International*	Brown Field; Valparaiso, IN	ESPN3	W 49–24	1,232
September 24	1:00 pm	Davidson^{†}	Brown Field; Valparaiso, IN	ESPN3	W 24–20	2,897
October 1	12:00 pm	at Morehead State	Jayne Stadium; Morehead, KY	OVCDN	L 26–29	3,453
October 8	1:00 pm	Drake	Brown Field; Valparaiso, IN	ESPN3	L 21–35	2,521
October 15	12:00 pm	at Stetson	Spec Martin Stadium; DeLand, FL	ESPN3	W 21–18	2,590
October 22	3:00 pm	at San Diego	Torero Stadium; San Diego, CA	W.TV	L 10–49	2,222
October 29	1:00 pm	Butler	Brown Field; Valparaiso, IN (Hoosier Helmet Trophy)	ESPN3	L 12–23	2,141
November 5	12:00 pm	at Dayton	Welcome Stadium; Dayton, OH	TWCS	L 21–37	4,193
November 12	1:00 pm	Jacksonville	Brown Field; Valparaiso, IN	WVUR	W 42–39	1,380
*Non-conference game; ^{†}Homecoming; Rankings from STATS FCS Poll released prior to game Poll released prior to the game; All times are in Eastern time

- Source: Schedule

== Game summaries ==
=== At Illinois State ===
	1	2	3	4	Total
Crusaders	3	7	0	3	13
#10 Redbirds	7	27	9	7	50

=== At Sacred Heart ===
	1	2	3	4	Total
Crusaders	7	7	0	0	14
Pioneers	7	28	7	0	42

=== Trinity International ===
	1	2	3	4	Total
Trojans	0	17	7	0	24
Crusaders	14	7	21	7	49

=== Davidson ===
	1	2	3	4	Total
Wildcats	6	7	0	7	20
Crusaders	7	10	7	0	24

=== At Morehead State ===
	1	2	3	4	Total
Crusaders	7	10	3	6	26
Eagles	14	0	7	8	29

=== Drake ===
	1	2	3	4	Total
Bulldogs	7	21	0	7	35
Crusaders	0	14	7	0	21

=== At Stetson ===
	1	2	3	4	Total
Crusaders	0	14	7	0	21
Hatters	5	7	6	0	18

=== San Diego ===
	1	2	3	4	Total
Crusaders	3	0	0	7	10
Toreros	14	14	14	7	49

=== Butler ===
	1	2	3	4	Total
Bulldogs	10	3	0	10	23
Crusaders	6	6	0	0	12

=== At Dayton ===
	1	2	3	4	Total
Crusaders	7	0	0	14	21
Flyers	14	10	13	0	37

=== Jacksonville ===
	1	2	3	4	Total
Dolphins	3	14	7	15	39
Crusaders	28	7	7	0	42
