= 2016 Stetson Hatters football team =

American college football season

2016 Stetson Hatters football
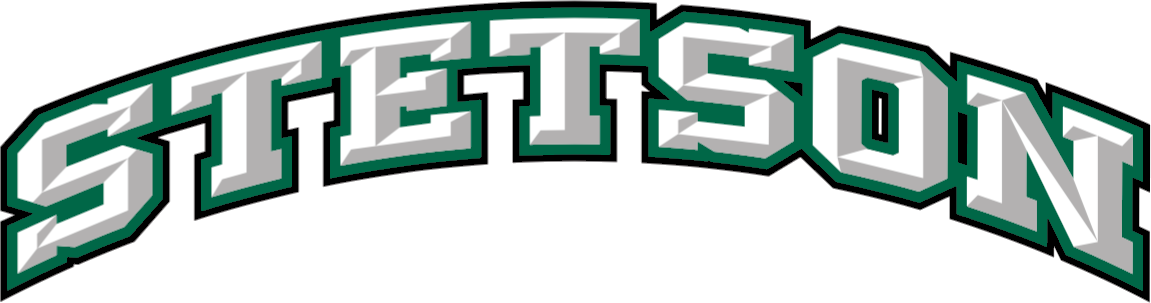
- Conference: Pioneer Football League
- Record: 4–7 (2–6 PFL)
- Head coach: Roger Hughes (4th season)
- Defensive coordinator: Brian Young (4th season)
- Home stadium: Spec Martin Stadium

2016 Pioneer Football League standings
	Conf.			Overall
Team	W		L	W		L
No. 19 San Diego $^	8	–	0	10	–	2
Dayton	7	–	1	9	–	2
Drake	6	–	2	7	–	4
Marist	5	–	3	5	–	6
Jacksonville	4	–	3	5	–	5
Campbell	3	–	4	5	–	5
Morehead State	3	–	5	4	–	7
Valparaiso	3	–	5	4	–	7
Butler	2	–	6	4	–	7
Stetson	2	–	6	4	–	7
Davidson	0	–	8	2	–	9
$ – Conference champion; ^ – FCS playoff participant; Rankings from STATS Poll

The 2016 Stetson Hatters football team represented Stetson University as a member of the Pioneer Football League (PFL) during the 2016 NCAA Division I FCS football season. Led by fourth-year head coach Roger Hughes, the Hatters compiled an overall record of 4–7 with a mark of 2–6 in conference play, tying for ninth place in the PFL. Stetson played home games at Spec Martin Stadium on DeLand, Florida.

== Schedule ==
Date	Time	Opponent	Site	TV	Result	Attendance
September 3	7:00 pm	Sacred Heart*	Spec Martin Stadium; DeLand, FL	ESPN3	L 14–18	2,900
September 10	7:00 pm	Warner*	Spec Martin Stadium; DeLand, FL	ESPN3	W 30–15	3,348
September 24	7:00 pm	Jacksonville	Spec Martin Stadium; DeLand, FL	ESPN3	L 7–24	4,047
October 1	1:00 pm	at Davidson	Richardson Stadium; Davidson, NC	DAA	W 31–27	4,281
October 8	12:30 pm	at Brown*	Brown Stadium; Providence, RI	ILDN	W 31–21	3,540
October 15	1:00 pm	Valparaiso	Spec Martin Stadium; DeLand, FL	ESPN3	L 18–21	2,590
October 22	4:00 pm	at Campbell	Barker–Lane Stadium; Buies Creek, NC	BSN	W 30–24 ^{OT}	6,673
October 29	1:00 pm	at Dayton	Welcome Stadium; Dayton, OH	YouTube	L 10–21	2,045
November 5	2:00 pm	Marist^{†}	Spec Martin Stadium; DeLand, FL	ESPN3	L 38–45	4,032
November 12	4:00 pm	at San Diego	Torero Stadium; San Diego, CA	TheW.tv	L 7–42	2,288
November 19	1:00 pm	Drake	Spec Martin Stadium; DeLand, FL	HV	L 17–45	3,712
*Non-conference game; ^{†}Homecoming; All times are in Eastern time

== Game summaries ==
=== Sacred Heart ===
	1	2	3	4	Total
Pioneers	6	0	6	6	18
Hatters	7	7	0	0	14

=== Warner ===
	1	2	3	4	Total
Royals	0	3	6	6	15
Hatters	13	14	0	3	30

=== Jacksonville ===
	1	2	3	4	Total
Dolphins	7	17	0	0	24
Hatters	0	0	7	0	7

=== At Davidson ===
	1	2	3	4	Total
Hatters	7	3	0	21	31
Wildcats	0	7	14	6	27

=== At Brown ===
	1	2	3	4	Total
Hatters	14	7	3	7	31
Bears	21	0	0	0	21

=== Valparaiso ===
	1	2	3	4	Total
Crusaders	0	14	7	0	21
Hatters	5	7	6	0	18

=== At Campbell ===
	1	2	3	4	OT	Total
Hatters	7	0	14	3	6	30
Fighting Camels	10	0	0	14	0	24

=== At Dayton ===
	1	2	3	4	Total
Hatters	3	0	0	7	10
Flyers	7	7	0	7	21

=== Marist ===
	1	2	3	4	Total
Red Foxes	14	17	7	7	45
Hatters	0	14	14	10	38

=== At San Diego ===
	1	2	3	4	Total
Hatters	7	0	0	0	7
Toreros	7	21	7	7	42

=== Drake ===
	1	2	3	4	Total
Bulldogs	3	14	14	14	45
Hatters	0	17	0	0	17
