= 2016 Coastal Carolina Chanticleers football team =

American college football season

2016 Coastal Carolina Chanticleers football
- Conference: Independent

Ranking
- STATS: No. 17
- Record: 10–2
- Head coach: Joe Moglia (5th season)
- Offensive coordinator: Dave Patenaude (5th season)
- Offensive scheme: Pro spread
- Defensive coordinator: Mickey Matthews (1st season)
- Base defense: 4–3
- Home stadium: Brooks Stadium

2016 NCAA Division I FCS independents football standings
	Conf.			Overall
Team	W		L	W		L
No. 18 Coastal Carolina		–		10	–	2
Coastal Carolina ineligible for FCS playoffs as part of FBS transition; Rankings from STATS Poll

The 2016 Coastal Carolina Chanticleers football team represented Coastal Carolina University as an independent the 2016 NCAA Division I FCS football season. Led by fifth-year head coach Joe Moglia, the Chanticleers compiled a record of 10–2. Coastal Carolina played home games at Brooks Stadium in Conway, South Carolina.

The Chanticleers joined the Sun Belt Conference in July 2016, initially as a full but non-football member. The football program began transition to the NCAA Division I Football Bowl Subdivision (FBS), joining Sun Belt football in 2017 and gaining full FBS membership and bowl eligibility in 2018.

== Schedule ==
Date	Time	Opponent	Rank	Site	TV	Result	Attendance
September 3	8:00 pm	at Lamar	No. 16	Provost Umphrey Stadium; Beaumont, TX	ESPN3	W 38–14	8,697
September 10	7:00 pm	Florida A&M	No. 17	Brooks Stadium; Conway, SC	ESPN3	W 49–10	10,037
September 17	2:00 pm	at No. 4 Jacksonville State	No. 17	Burgess–Snow Field at JSU Stadium; Jacksonville, AL	OVCDN	L 26–27	14,265
September 24	6:00 pm	Furman	No. 17	Brooks Stadium; Conway, SC	CSN	W 41–21	10,311
October 1	6:00 pm	No. 10 Charleston Southern	No. 14	Brooks Stadium; Conway, SC	ESPN3	L 58–59 ^{2OT}	10,213
October 15	1:30 pm	at Gardner–Webb	No. 16	Ernest W. Spangler Stadium; Boiling Springs, NC	BSN	W 17–7	6,850
October 22	2:00 pm	Central Connecticut^{†}	No. T–17	Brooks Stadium; Conway, SC	CSN	W 33–25	9,217
October 29	2:00 pm	at Presbyterian	No. 18	Bailey Memorial Stadium; Clinton, SC	ESPN3	W 48–17	4,453
November 5	2:00 pm	Monmouth	No. 18	Brooks Stadium; Conway, SC	ESPN3	W 38–17	7,123
November 12	2:00 pm	Bryant	No. 15	Brooks Stadium; Conway, SC	CSN	W 31–21	6,528
November 17	7:00 pm	Liberty	No. 16	Brooks Stadium; Conway, SC (rivalry)	ESPNews	W 42–7	7,787
November 26	2:00 pm	Hampton	No. 15	Brooks Stadium; Conway, SC	CSN	W 26–7	5,921
^{†}Homecoming; Rankings from STATS Poll released prior to the game; All times are in Eastern time

== Ranking movements ==
Ranking movements Legend: ██ Increase in ranking ██ Decrease in ranking — = Not ranked т = Tied with team above or below
	Week													
Poll	Pre	1	2	3	4	5	6	7	8	9	10	11	12	Final
STATS FCS	16	17	17	17	14	17	16	17–T	18	18	15	16	15	18
Coaches*	—	—	—	—	—	—	—	—	—	—	—	—	—	—

Due to their transition to FBS, Coastal Carolina was not eligible to be ranked in the FCS Coaches Poll.

== Game summaries ==
=== At Lamar ===
	1	2	3	4	Total
#16 Chanticleers	3	0	25	10	38
Cardinals	7	7	0	0	14

=== Florida A&M ===
	1	2	3	4	Total
Rattlers	0	7	0	3	10
#17 Chanticleers	22	14	6	7	49

=== At Jacksonville State ===
	1	2	3	4	Total
#17 Chanticleers	3	9	6	8	26
#4 Gamecocks	7	6	7	7	27

=== Furman ===
	1	2	3	4	Total
Paladins	0	7	7	7	21
#17 Chanticleers	7	20	7	7	41

=== Charleston Southern ===
	1	2	3	4	OT	2OT	Total
#10 Buccaneers	7	16	7	15	7	7	59
#14 Chanticleers	21	0	14	10	7	6	58

=== At Gardner–Webb ===
	1	2	3	4	Total
#16 Chanticleers	0	3	0	14	17
Runnin' Bulldogs	0	7	0	0	7

=== Central Connecticut ===
	1	2	3	4	Total
Blue Devils	0	3	7	15	25
#17–T Chanticleers	7	16	3	7	33

=== At Presbyterian ===
	1	2	3	4	Total
#18 Chanticleers	23	7	11	7	48
Blue Hose	7	10	0	0	17

=== Monmouth ===
	1	2	3	4	Total
Hawks	10	7	0	0	17
#18 Chanticleers	3	7	14	14	38

=== Bryant ===
	1	2	3	4	Total
Bulldogs	7	7	7	0	21
#15 Chanticleers	6	3	7	15	31

=== Liberty ===
	1	2	3	4	Total
Flames	0	7	0	0	7
#16 Chanticleers	7	21	7	7	42

=== Hampton ===
	1	2	3	4	Total
Pirates	0	0	0	7	7
#15 Chanticleers	10	6	0	10	26
