= Paul Nichols =

American football player and coach (born 1981)

Biographical details
- Born: January 25, 1981 (age 45); Dunwoody, Georgia, U.S.
- Education: Davidson College (BA, 2003)

Playing career
- 1999–2002: Davidson
- Position: Quarterback

Coaching career (HC unless noted)
- 2004–2005: Ohio State (GA)
- 2006: Marshall (DB)
- 2007–2008: Marshall (CB)
- 2009–2011: Toledo (co-DC/S)
- 2012: Illinois (DPP)
- 2013–2017: Davidson
- 2018–2019: Georgia Tech (QC)

Head coaching record
- Overall: 7–43

Paul Nichols (born January 25, 1981) is an American college football coach and former player. He was a quality control specialist for offense at the Georgia Institute of Technology from 2018 to 2019. Nichols served as the head football coach at Davidson College from 2013 to 2017, compiling a record of 7–43. He previously played quarterback at Davidson from 1999 to 2002 and, as a sophomore in 2000, helped lead the Wildcats to the only undefeated season in program history (10–0).

== Early life and education ==
Nichols was born in Dunwoody, Georgia, and attended Marist School in Atlanta, graduating in 1999. He matriculated to Davidson College, where he earned bachelor's degrees in political science and history in 2003.

== Playing career ==
After limited action as a freshman in 1999, Nichols became Davidson's starting quarterback in 2000 and led the Wildcats to a 10–0 record, the program's first and only undefeated season. He departed as the school's career leader in passing yards (5,822), completions (465) and touchdown passes (51), marks later surpassed by successors; he remains among the program leaders in each category. His senior season in 2002 earned him first-team all-conference and academic all-conference honors, along with honorable mention All-America recognition.

== Coaching career ==
=== Assistant positions ===
Nichols began his coaching career as a graduate assistant at Ohio State University from 2004 to 2005. He joined Marshall University's staff in 2006 as defensive backs coach and coached cornerbacks from 2007 to 2008. From 2009 to 2011 he was co-defensive coordinator and safeties coach at the University of Toledo. In 2012, Nichols served as director of player personnel at the University of Illinois under head coach Tim Beckman.

=== Davidson ===
Nichols was introduced as Davidson's 27th head football coach in 2013 at age 31, making him the youngest head coach in NCAA Division I at the time. Over five seasons, his teams compiled an overall record of 7–43 (1–33 PFL). Davidson did not renew Nichols' contract following the 2017 season.

=== Georgia Tech ===
Nichols joined Georgia Tech in 2018 as an offensive quality control specialist, assisting with opponent scouting and game planning, and remained through the 2019 season.

== Head coaching record ==
Year	Team	Overall	Conference	Standing	Bowl/playoffs
Davidson Wildcats (Pioneer Football League) (2013–2017)
2013	Davidson	0–11	0–8	11th	
2014	Davidson	1–11	0–8	11th	
2015	Davidson	2–9	1–7	T–8th	
2016	Davidson	2–9	0–8	11th	
2017	Davidson	2–9	0–8	11th	
Davidson:		7–43	1–33		
Total:		7–43			

== Impact and legacy ==
At Davidson, Nichols recruited portions of the roster that later achieved the program's first winning seasons in more than a decade under his successor, and he was credited by the school with mentoring quarterbacks and emphasizing academic performance and community engagement. As a player, his role as starting quarterback on the 2000 undefeated team remains a notable milestone in Davidson football history.

== Personal life ==
Nichols and his wife, Lauran, have three sons.
