= 2016 Drake Bulldogs football team =

American college football season

2016 Drake Bulldogs football
- Conference: Pioneer Football League
- Record: 7–4 (6–2 PFL)
- Head coach: Rick Fox (3rd season)
- Defensive coordinator: Todd Stepsis (3rd season)
- Home stadium: Drake Stadium

2016 Pioneer Football League standings
	Conf.			Overall
Team	W		L	W		L
No. 19 San Diego $^	8	–	0	10	–	2
Dayton	7	–	1	9	–	2
Drake	6	–	2	7	–	4
Marist	5	–	3	5	–	6
Jacksonville	4	–	3	5	–	5
Campbell	3	–	4	5	–	5
Morehead State	3	–	5	4	–	7
Valparaiso	3	–	5	4	–	7
Butler	2	–	6	4	–	7
Stetson	2	–	6	4	–	7
Davidson	0	–	8	2	–	9
$ – Conference champion; ^ – FCS playoff participant; Rankings from STATS Poll

The 2016 Drake Bulldogs football team represented Drake University as a member of the Pioneer Football League (PFL) during 2016 NCAA Division I FCS football season. Led by third-year head coach Rick Fox, the Bulldogs compiled an overall record of 7–4 with a mark of 6–2 in conference play, placing third in the PFL. The team played its home games at Drake Stadium in Des Moines, Iowa.

== Schedule ==
Date	Time	Opponent	Site	TV	Result	Attendance
September 3	6:00 pm	Quincy*	Drake Stadium; Des Moines, IA	BV	L 35–38	2,674
September 10	6:00 pm	at No. 9 South Dakota State*	Dana J. Dykhouse Stadium; Brookings, SD	ESPN3	L 28–56	15,171
September 17	1:00 pm	McKendree*	Drake Stadium; Des Moines, IA	BV	W 28–16	1,784
September 24	1:00 pm	Morehead State^{†}	Drake Stadium; Des Moines, IA	BV	W 30–28	3,158
October 1	12:00 pm	at Dayton	Welcome Stadium; Dayton, OH (rivalry)	YouTube	L 10–35	2,457
October 8	1:00 pm	at Valparaiso	Brown Field; Valporaiso, IN	ESPN3	W 35–21	2,521
October 15	12:30 pm	San Diego	Drake Stadium; Des Moines, IA	BV	L 7–38	1,740
October 29	1:00 pm	Campbell	Drake Stadium; Des Moines, IA	BV	W 33–21	1,727
November 5	12:00 pm	at Jacksonville	D. B. Milne Field; Jacksonville, FL	ESPN3	W 31–27	471
November 12	1:00 pm	Butler	Drake Stadium; Des Moines, IA	BV	W 28–14	1,897
November 19	12:00 pm	at Stetson	Spec Martin Stadium; DeLand, FL	HV	W 45–17	3,712
*Non-conference game; ^{†}Homecoming; Rankings from STATS Poll released prior to the game; All times are in Central time

== Game summaries ==
=== Quincy ===
	1	2	3	4	Total
Hawks	9	19	3	7	38
Bulldogs	7	14	7	7	35

=== @ South Dakota State ===
	1	2	3	4	Total
Bulldogs	0	14	0	14	28
#9 Jackrabbits	21	7	7	21	56

=== McKendree ===
	1	2	3	4	Total
Bearcats	10	0	0	6	16
Bulldogs	0	14	14	0	28

=== Morehead State ===
	1	2	3	4	Total
Eagles	8	0	0	20	28
Bulldogs	6	10	14	0	30

=== @ Dayton ===
	1	2	3	4	Total
Bulldogs	0	3	7	0	10
Flyers	14	7	7	7	35

=== @ Valparaiso ===
	1	2	3	4	Total
Bulldogs	7	21	0	7	35
Crusaders	0	14	7	0	21

=== San Diego ===
	1	2	3	4	Total
Toreros	7	17	14	0	38
Bulldogs	0	0	0	7	7

=== Campbell ===
	1	2	3	4	Total
Fighting Camels	0	7	7	7	21
Bulldogs	17	3	6	7	33

=== @ Jacksonville ===
	1	2	3	4	Total
Bulldogs	0	7	10	14	31
Dolphins	10	3	0	14	27

=== Butler ===
	1	2	3	4	Total
BU Bulldogs	0	7	7	0	14
DU Bulldogs	7	7	14	0	28

=== @ Stetson ===
	1	2	3	4	Total
Bulldogs	3	14	14	14	45
Hatters	0	17	0	0	17
