= 2016 Presbyterian Blue Hose football team =

American college football season

2016 Presbyterian Blue Hose football
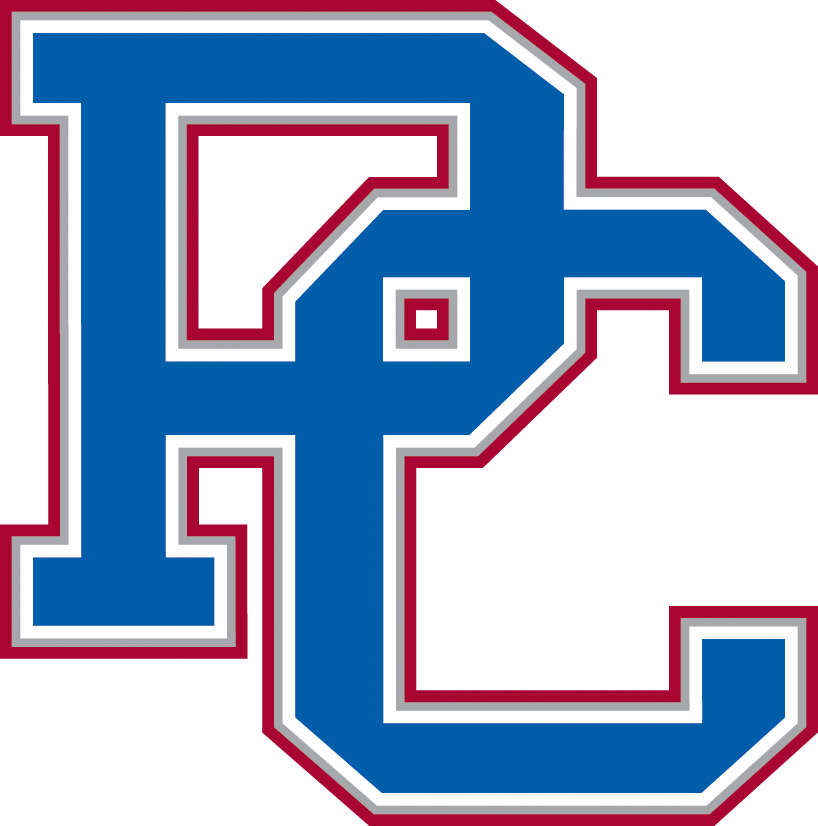
- Conference: Big South Conference
- Record: 2–9 (1–4 Big South)
- Head coach: Harold Nichols (8th season)
- Offensive coordinator: Todd Varn
- Defensive coordinator: Tommy Spangler
- Home stadium: Bailey Memorial Stadium

2016 Big South Conference football standings
	Conf.			Overall
Team	W		L	W		L
No. 15 Charleston Southern +^	4	–	1	7	–	4
Liberty +	4	–	1	6	–	5
Kennesaw State	3	–	2	8	–	3
Gardner–Webb	3	–	2	5	–	6
Presbyterian	1	–	4	2	–	9
Monmouth	0	–	5	4	–	7
+ – Conference co-champions; ^ – FCS playoff participant; Rankings from STATS Poll

The 2016 Presbyterian Blue Hose football team represented Presbyterian College in the 2016 NCAA Division I FCS football season. They were led by eighth-year head coach Harold Nichols and played their home games at Bailey Memorial Stadium. They were a member of the Big South Conference. They finished the season 2–9, 1–4 in Big South play to finish in fifth place.

On December 20, head coach Harold Nichols resigned. He finished at Presbyterian with an eight year record of 21–67.

== Schedule ==
Date	Time	Opponent	Site	TV	Result	Attendance
September 1	7:00 p.m.	at Central Michigan*	Kelly/Shorts Stadium; Mount Pleasant, MI	ESPN3	L 3–49	16,215
September 10	2:00 p.m.	at No. 6 Chattanooga*	Finley Stadium; Chattanooga, TN	SDN	L 0–34	8,370
September 17	6:00 p.m.	at Campbell*	Barker–Lane Stadium; Buies Creek, NC	BSN	W 31–14	5,860
September 24	7:00 p.m.	No. 19 (D-II) Florida Tech*	Bailey Memorial Stadium; Clinton, SC	BSN	L 7–28	3,290
October 8	6:00 p.m.	at Gardner–Webb	Ernest W. Spangler Stadium; Boiling Springs, NC	ESPN3	L 3–24	2,750
October 13	7:00 p.m.	Monmouth	Bailey Memorial Stadium; Clinton, SC	BSN; ESPN3	W 17–13	2,350
October 22	6:00 p.m.	at No. 9 Charleston Southern	Buccaneer Field; Charleston, SC	ESPN3	L 3–38	5,375
October 29	2:00 p.m.	No. 18 Coastal Carolina*^{†}	Bailey Memorial Stadium; Clinton, SC	ESPN3	L 17–48	4,453
November 5	2:00 p.m.	Liberty	Bailey Memorial Stadium; Clinton, SC	ESPN3	L 0–16	3,101
November 12	Noon	at Kennesaw State	Fifth Third Bank Stadium; Kennesaw, GA	ASN	L 10–45	7,186
November 19	7:00 p.m.	at South Alabama*	Ladd–Peebles Stadium; Mobile, AL	ESPN3	L 7–31	11,017
*Non-conference game; ^{†}Homecoming; Rankings from STATS Poll released prior to the game; All times are in Eastern time

- Source: Schedule

== Game summaries ==
=== At Central Michigan ===
	1	2	3	4	Total
Blue Hose	0	3	0	0	3
Chippewas	7	7	14	21	49

=== At Chattanooga ===
	1	2	3	4	Total
Blue Hose	0	0	0	0	0
#6 Mocs	7	13	14	0	34

=== At Campbell ===
	1	2	3	4	Total
Blue Hose	10	14	0	7	31
Fighting Camels	0	6	0	8	14

=== Florida Tech ===
	1	2	3	4	Total
#19 (D-II) Panthers	7	7	7	7	28
Blue Hose	0	0	7	0	7

=== At Gardner–Webb ===
	1	2	3	4	Total
Blue Hose	0	3	0	0	3
Runnin' Bulldogs	10	0	7	7	24

=== Monmouth ===
	1	2	3	4	Total
Hawks	0	7	6	0	13
Blue Hose	0	7	3	7	17

=== At Charleston Southern ===
	1	2	3	4	Total
Blue Hose	0	3	0	0	3
#9 Buccaneers	0	21	14	3	38

=== Coastal Carolina ===
	1	2	3	4	Total
#18 Chanticleers	23	7	11	7	48
Blue Hose	7	10	0	0	17

=== Liberty ===
	1	2	3	4	Total
Flames	6	3	0	7	16
Blue Hose	0	0	0	0	0

=== At Kennesaw State ===
	1	2	3	4	Total
Blue Hose	3	0	7	0	10
Owls	14	10	7	14	45

=== At South Alabama ===
	1	2	3	4	Total
Blue Hose	0	0	7	0	7
Jaguars	7	14	0	10	31
