= 2016 Kennesaw State Owls football team =

American college football season

2016 Kennesaw State Owls football
- Conference: Big South Conference
- Record: 8–3 (3–2 Big South)
- Head coach: Brian Bohannon (2nd season)
- Offensive coordinator: Grant Chesnut (2nd season)
- Offensive scheme: Flexbone option
- Defensive coordinator: Brian Newberry (2nd season)
- Base defense: 4–2–5
- Home stadium: Fifth Third Bank Stadium

2016 Big South Conference football standings
	Conf.			Overall
Team	W		L	W		L
No. 15 Charleston Southern +^	4	–	1	7	–	4
Liberty +	4	–	1	6	–	5
Kennesaw State	3	–	2	8	–	3
Gardner–Webb	3	–	2	5	–	6
Presbyterian	1	–	4	2	–	9
Monmouth	0	–	5	4	–	7
+ – Conference co-champions; ^ – FCS playoff participant; Rankings from STATS Poll

The 2016 Kennesaw State Owls football team was an NCAA team that represented Kennesaw State University in the 2016 NCAA Division I FCS football season. They were led by second-year head coach Brian Bohannon and played their home games at Fifth Third Bank Stadium. They were second-year members of the Big South Conference. This season was the Owls second season of intercollegiate football. They finished the season 8–3, 3–2 in Big South play to finish in a tie for third place.

== Schedule ==
Date	Time	Opponent	Site	TV	Result	Attendance
September 3	7:00 pm	East Tennessee State*	Fifth Third Bank Stadium; Kennesaw, GA	WPCH	L 17–20 ^{2OT}	8,574
September 10	7:00 pm	Point*	Fifth Third Bank Stadium; Kennesaw, GA	WPCH	W 49–3	8,354
September 24	1:00 pm	at Duquesne*	Arthur J. Rooney Athletic Field; Pittsburgh, PA	ESPN3	W 36–28	2,658
October 1	3:00 pm	at Furman*	Paladin Stadium; Greenville, SC	ESPN3	W 52–42	6,970
October 8	1:00 pm	Missouri S&T*	Fifth Third Bank Stadium; Kennesaw, GA	WPCH	W 49–16	6,775
October 15	7:00 pm	Liberty^{†}	Fifth Third Bank Stadium; Kennesaw, GA	ESPN3	L 21–36	8,803
October 22	12:00 pm	at Gardner–Webb	Ernest W. Spangler Stadium; Boiling Springs, NC	ASN	W 47–39	2,450
October 29	1:00 pm	at Monmouth	Kessler Field; West Long Branch, NJ	ESPN3	W 49–17	3,869
November 5	1:00 pm	Clark Atlanta*	Fifth Third Bank Stadium; Kennesaw, GA	WPCH	W 56–0	6,916
November 12	12:00 pm	Presbyterian	Fifth Third Bank Stadium; Kennesaw, GA	ASN	W 45–10	7,186
November 19	11:45 am	at No. 14 Charleston Southern	Buccaneer Field; Charleston, SC	ESPN3	L 7–28	2,446
*Non-conference game; ^{†}Homecoming; Rankings from STATS FCS Poll released prior to game Poll released prior to the game; All times are in Eastern time

- Source: Schedule

== Game summaries ==
=== East Tennessee State ===
East Tennessee State @ Kennesaw State

Team	1	2	3	4	OT	Total
• Buccaneers	0	3	7	0	10	20
Owls	0	7	0	3	7	17

- Date: September 3
- Location: Fifth Third Bank Stadium
  Kennesaw, GA
- Game start: 7:00 PM EDT
- Elapsed time: 3:38
- Game attendance: 8,574
- Game weather: 75 °F (24 °C) • Wind SE 4 mph (6.4 km/h) • Partly cloudy
- Referee: Drew Myers
- TV announcers (WPCH): Brian Katrek, D.J. Shockley, and Nathan McCreary

=== Point ===
Point @ Kennesaw State

Team	1	2	3	4	Total
Skyhawks	0	3	0	0	3
• Owls	14	14	14	7	49

- Date: September 10
- Location: Fifth Third Bank Stadium
  Kennesaw, GA
- Game start: 7:00 PM EDT
- Elapsed time: 3:02
- Game attendance: 8,354
- Game weather: 88 °F (31 °C) • Wind SW 4 mph (6.4 km/h) • Partly cloudy
- Referee: Matt Young
- TV announcers (WPCH): Brian Katrek, D.J. Shockley, and Nathan McCreary

=== @ Duquesne ===
Kennesaw State @ Duquesne

Team	1	2	3	4	Total
• Owls	6	10	6	14	36
Dukes	7	10	3	8	28

- Date: September 24
- Location: Arthur J. Rooney Athletic Field
  Pittsburgh, PA
- Game start: 1:00 PM EDT
- Elapsed time: 3:01
- Game attendance: 2,658
- Game weather: 72 °F (22 °C) • Wind NNE 7 mph (11 km/h) • Cloudy
- Referee: Carl Vaccaro
- TV announcers (ESPN3): Todd McCall, Tim Benz

=== @ Furman ===
Kennesaw State @ Furman

Team	1	2	3	4	Total
• Owls	21	28	0	3	52
Paladins	0	14	21	7	42

- Date: October 1
- Location: Paladin Stadium
  Greenville, SC
- Game start: 3:00 PM EDT
- Elapsed time: 3:34
- Game attendance: 6,970
- Game weather: 76 °F (24 °C) • Wind NE 5 mph (8.0 km/h) • Sunny
- Referee: Thomas Graham
- TV announcers (ESPN3): Bob Mihalic, Don Clardy

=== Missouri S&T ===
Missouri S&T @ Kennesaw State

Team	1	2	3	4	Total
Miners	7	9	0	0	16
• Owls	14	7	7	21	49

- Date: October 8
- Location: Fifth Third Bank Stadium
  Kennesaw, GA
- Game start: 1:00 PM EDT
- Elapsed time: 3:01
- Game attendance: 6,775
- Game weather: 78 °F (26 °C) • Wind WNW 15 mph (24 km/h) • Sunny
- Referee: Jeff Flanagan
- TV announcers (WPCH): Brian Katrek, D.J. Shockley, and Nathan McCreary

=== Liberty ===
Liberty @ Kennesaw State

Team	1	2	3	4	Total
• Flames	7	13	6	10	36
Owls	7	7	0	7	21

- Date: October 15
- Location: Fifth Third Bank Stadium
  Kennesaw, GA
- Game start: 7:00 PM EDT
- Elapsed time: 3:11
- Game attendance: 8,803
- Game weather: 71 °F (22 °C) • Wind SE 12 mph (19 km/h) • Partly cloudy
- Referee: Duane Heydt
- TV announcers (ESPN3): Evan Lepler, Renaldo Wyan

=== @ Gardner–Webb ===
Kennesaw State @ Gardner–Webb

Team	1	2	3	4	Total
• Owls	20	20	7	0	47
Runnin' Bulldogs	7	14	10	8	39

- Date: October 22
- Location: Ernest W. Spangler Stadium
  Boiling Springs, NC
- Game start: 12:00 PM EDT
- Elapsed time: 3:01
- Game attendance: 2,450
- Game weather: 57 °F (14 °C) • Wind NNW 11 mph (18 km/h) • Clear, Sunny, Cool
- Referee: Stuart Mullins
- TV announcers (ASN): Mike Hogewood, Renaldo Wynn

=== @ Monmouth ===
Kennesaw State @ Monmouth

Team	1	2	3	4	Total
• Owls	7	21	14	7	49
Hawks	3	14	0	0	17

- Date: October 29
- Location: Kessler Field
  West Long Branch, NJ
- Game start: 1:00 PM EDT
- Elapsed time: 2:57
- Game attendance: 3,869
- Game weather: 54 °F (12 °C) • Wind SW 11 mph (18 km/h) • Sunny
- Referee: Jeff Maconaghy
- TV announcers (ESPN3): Matt Harmon, Todderick Hunt

=== Clark Atlanta ===
Clark Atlanta @ Kennesaw State

Team	1	2	3	4	Total
Panthers	0	0	0	0	0
• Owls	14	14	14	14	56

- Date: November 5
- Location: Fifth Third Bank Stadium
  Kennesaw, GA
- Game start: 1:00 PM EST
- Elapsed time: 2:54
- Game attendance: 6,916
- Game weather: 68 °F (20 °C) • Wind E 1 mph (1.6 km/h) • Sunny
- Referee: Jeff Heaser
- TV announcers (WPCH): Brian Katrek, D.J. Shockley, and Nathan McCreary

=== Presbyterian ===
Presbyterian @ Kennesaw State

Team	1	2	3	4	Total
Blue Hose	3	0	7	0	10
• Owls	14	10	7	14	45

- Date: November 12
- Location: Fifth Third Bank Stadium
  Kennesaw, GA
- Game start: 12:00 PM EST
- Elapsed time: 2:50
- Game attendance: 7,186
- Game weather: 60 °F (16 °C) • Wind W 5 mph (8.0 km/h) • Partly sunny
- Referee: Ron Cherry
- TV announcers (ASN): Mike Hogewood, Renaldo Wynn

=== @ Charleston Southern ===
Kennesaw State @ Charleston Southern

Team	1	2	3	4	Total
Owls	0	7	0	0	7
• #14 Buccaneers	14	7	0	7	28

- Date: November 19
- Location: Buccaneer Field
  Charleston, SC
- Game start: 11:45 AM EST
- Elapsed time: 2:54
- Game attendance: 2,446
- Game weather: 70 °F (21 °C) • Partly cloudy
- Referee: Riley Johnson
- TV announcers (ESPN3): Mike Hogewood, Renaldo Wynn

== Ranking movements ==
Ranking movements Legend: ██ Increase in ranking ██ Decrease in ranking — = Not ranked RV = Received votes
	Week													
Poll	Pre	1	2	3	4	5	6	7	8	9	10	11	12	Final
STATS FCS	RV	—	—	—	RV	RV	RV	—	RV	RV	RV	RV	RV	
Coaches	—	—	—	—	—	—	RV	—	—	—	RV	22	RV	
