= 2016 Marist Red Foxes football team =

American college football season

2016 Marist Red Foxes football
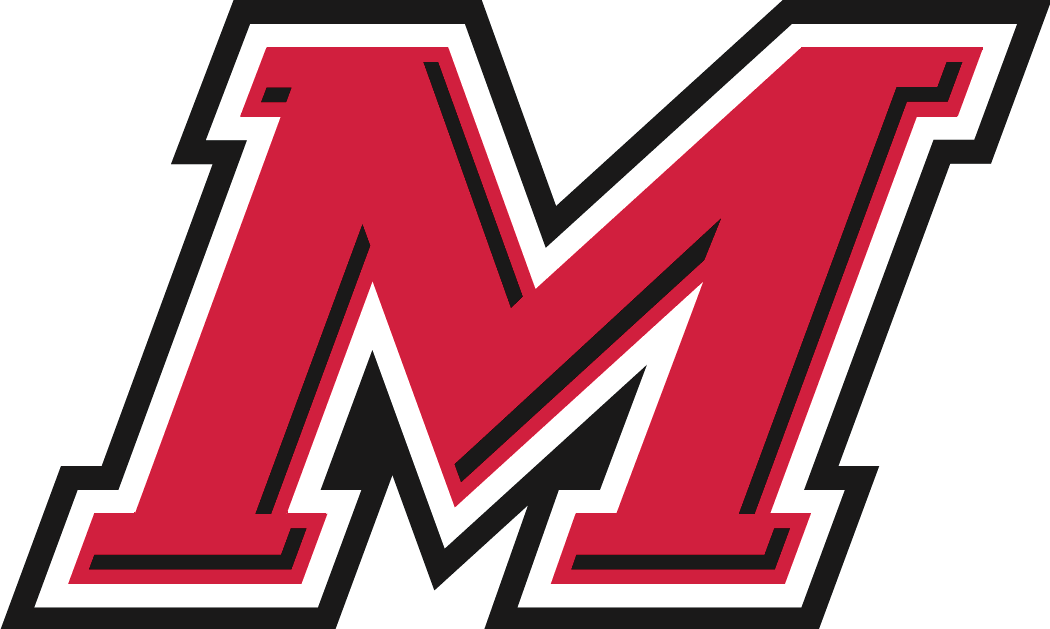
- Conference: Pioneer Football League
- Record: 5–6 (5–3 PFL)
- Head coach: Jim Parady (25th season)
- Offensive coordinator: Nate Fields (4th season)
- Defensive coordinator: Scott Rumsey (16th season)
- Home stadium: Tenney Stadium at Leonidoff Field

2016 Pioneer Football League standings
	Conf.			Overall
Team	W		L	W		L
No. 19 San Diego $^	8	–	0	10	–	2
Dayton	7	–	1	9	–	2
Drake	6	–	2	7	–	4
Marist	5	–	3	5	–	6
Jacksonville	4	–	3	5	–	5
Campbell	3	–	4	5	–	5
Morehead State	3	–	5	4	–	7
Valparaiso	3	–	5	4	–	7
Butler	2	–	6	4	–	7
Stetson	2	–	6	4	–	7
Davidson	0	–	8	2	–	9
$ – Conference champion; ^ – FCS playoff participant; Rankings from STATS Poll

The 2016 Marist Red Foxes football team represented Marist College as a member of the Pioneer Football League (PFL) during the 2016 NCAA Division I FCS football season. Led by 25th-year head coach Jim Parady, the Red Foxes compiled an overall record of 5–6 with a mark of 5–3 in conference play, placing fourth in the PFL. Marist played home games at Tenney Stadium at Leonidoff Field in Poughkeepsie, New York.

== Schedule ==
Date	Time	Opponent	Site	TV	Result	Attendance
September 3	6:00 pm	Bucknell*	Tenney Stadium at Leonidoff Field; Poughkeepsie, NY	RFN	L 10–26	3,363
September 10	6:00 pm	Georgetown*	Tenney Stadium at Leonidoff Field; Poughkeepsie, NY	RFN	L 17–20	2,133
September 17	5:00 pm	at Sacred Heart*	Campus Field; Fairfield, CT	NECFR	L 6–31	3,293
October 1	1:00 pm	Campbell	Tenney Stadium at Leonidoff Field; Poughkeepsie, NY	RFN	W 24–7	3,171
October 8	1:00 pm	at Butler	Butler Bowl; Indianapolis, IN	BAA	W 30–21	5,236
October 15	1:00 pm	at Morehead State	Jayne Stadium; Morehead, KY	OVCDN	W 44–41 ^{OT}	8,789
October 22	12:00 pm	Davidson^{†}	Tenney Stadium at Leonidoff Field; Poughkeepsie, NY	RFN	W 31–10	1,236
October 29	1:00 pm	San Diego	Tenney Stadium at Leonidoff Field; Poughkeepsie, NY	RFN	L 3–27	1,604
November 5	2:00 pm	at Stetson	Spec Martin Stadium; DeLand, FL	ESPN3	W 45–38	4,032
November 12	1:00 pm	Dayton	Tenney Stadium at Leonidoff Field; Poughkeepsie, NY	RFN	L 31–59	1,734
November 19	12:00 pm	at Jacksonville	D. B. Milne Field; Jacksonville, FL	ESPN3	L 35–41	1,738
*Non-conference game; ^{†}Homecoming; All times are in Eastern time

== Game summaries ==
=== Bucknell ===
	1	2	3	4	Total
Bison	7	13	0	6	26
Red Foxes	3	0	7	0	10

=== Georgetown ===
	1	2	3	4	Total
Hoyas	3	3	7	7	20
Red Foxes	10	0	7	0	17

=== At Sacred Heart ===
	1	2	3	4	Total
Red Foxes	3	3	0	0	6
Pioneers	0	14	10	7	31

=== Campbell ===
	1	2	3	4	Total
Fighting Camels	0	7	0	0	7
Red Foxes	0	3	14	7	24

=== At Butler ===
	1	2	3	4	Total
Red Foxes	0	20	0	10	30
Bulldogs	7	7	7	0	21

=== At Morehead State ===
	1	2	3	4	OT	Total
Red Foxes	14	3	14	7	6	44
Eagles	14	0	14	10	3	41

=== Davidson ===
	1	2	3	4	Total
Wildcats	0	3	0	7	10
Red Foxes	14	7	7	3	31

=== San Diego ===
	1	2	3	4	Total
Toreros	7	6	0	14	27
Red Foxes	0	3	0	0	3

=== At Stetson ===
	1	2	3	4	Total
Red Foxes	14	17	7	7	45
Hatters	0	14	14	10	38

=== Dayton ===
	1	2	3	4	Total
Flyers	17	14	7	21	59
Red Foxes	3	14	7	7	31

=== At Jacksonville ===
	1	2	3	4	Total
Red Foxes	7	7	14	7	35
Dolphins	3	21	17	0	41
