= 2016 Gardner–Webb Runnin' Bulldogs football team =

American college football season

2016 Gardner–Webb Runnin' Bulldogs football
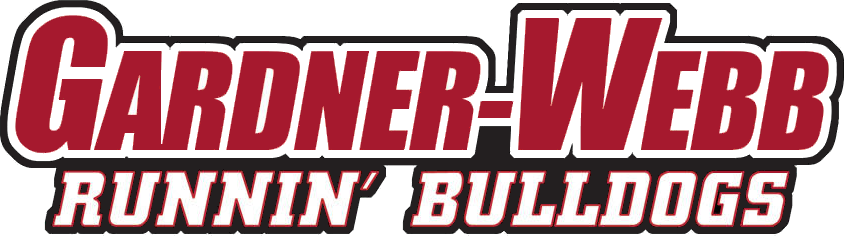
- Conference: Big South Conference
- Record: 5–6 (3–2 Big South)
- Head coach: Carroll McCray (4th season)
- Offensive coordinator: Brett Nichols (2nd season)
- Defensive coordinator: Travis Cunningham (1st season)
- Home stadium: Ernest W. Spangler Stadium

2016 Big South Conference football standings
	Conf.			Overall
Team	W		L	W		L
No. 15 Charleston Southern +^	4	–	1	7	–	4
Liberty +	4	–	1	6	–	5
Kennesaw State	3	–	2	8	–	3
Gardner–Webb	3	–	2	5	–	6
Presbyterian	1	–	4	2	–	9
Monmouth	0	–	5	4	–	7
+ – Conference co-champions; ^ – FCS playoff participant; Rankings from STATS Poll

The 2016 Gardner–Webb Runnin' Bulldogs football team represented Gardner–Webb University as a member of the Big South Conference during the 2016 NCAA Division I FCS football season. Led by fourth-year head coach Carroll McCray, the Runnin' Bulldogs compiled an overall record of 5–6 with a mark of 3–2 in conference play, tying for third place in the Big South. Gardner–Webb played home games at Ernest W. Spangler Stadium in Boiling Springs, North Carolina.

== Schedule ==
Date	Time	Opponent	Site	TV	Result	Attendance
September 3	3:30 pm	at Elon*	Rhodes Stadium; Elon, NC	ASN	W 31–6	11,250
September 10	6:00 pm	at Western Carolina*	E. J. Whitmire Stadium; Cullowhee, NC	SDN	L 14–44	11,598
September 17	6:00 pm	No. 15 The Citadel*	Ernest W. Spangler Stadium; Boiling Springs, NC	BSN	L 24–31	6,850
September 24	2:00 pm	at Ohio*	Peden Stadium; Athens, OH	ESPN3	L 21–37	22,265
October 1	6:00 pm	Benedict*	Ernest W. Spangler Stadium; Boiling Springs, NC	BSN	W 45–0	3,487
October 8	6:00 pm	Presbyterian	Ernest W. Spangler Stadium; Boiling Springs, NC	ESPN3	W 24–3	2,750
October 15	1:30 pm	No. 16 Coastal Carolina*^{†}	Ernest W. Spangler Stadium; Boiling Springs, NC	BSN	L 7–17	6,850
October 22	1:30 pm	Kennesaw State	Ernest W. Spangler Stadium; Boiling Springs, NC	ASN	L 39–47	2,450
October 29	3:30 pm	at Liberty	Williams Stadium; Lynchburg, VA	BSN	L 20–23 ^{OT}	16,608
November 5	11:45 am	at No. 8 Charleston Southern	Buccaneer Field; Charleston, SC	ASN	W 17–10	1,603
November 19	1:30 pm	Monmouth	Ernest W. Spangler Stadium; Boiling Springs, NC	ESPN3	W 34–33 ^{OT}	3,380
*Non-conference game; ^{†}Homecoming; Rankings from STATS Poll released prior to the game; All times are in Eastern time

== Game summaries ==
=== At Elon ===
	1	2	3	4	Total
Runnin' Bulldogs	0	3	14	14	31
Phoenix	0	3	3	0	6

=== At Western Carolina ===
	1	2	3	4	Total
Runnin' Bulldogs	7	7	0	0	14
Catamounts	14	3	13	14	44

=== The Citadel ===
	1	2	3	4	Total
#15 Bulldogs	7	7	7	10	31
Runnin' Bulldogs	7	3	7	7	24

=== At Ohio ===
	1	2	3	4	Total
Runnin' Bulldogs	7	0	7	7	21
Bobcats	14	16	7	0	37

=== Benedict ===
	1	2	3	4	Total
Tigers	0	0	0	0	0
Runnin' Bulldogs	0	24	14	7	45

=== Presbyterian ===
	1	2	3	4	Total
Blue Hose	0	3	0	0	3
Runnin' Bulldogs	10	0	7	7	24

=== Coastal Carolina ===
	1	2	3	4	Total
#16 Chanticleers	0	3	0	14	17
Runnin' Bulldogs	0	7	0	0	7

=== Kennesaw State ===
	1	2	3	4	Total
Owls	20	20	7	0	47
Runnin' Bulldogs	7	14	10	8	39

=== At Liberty ===
	1	2	3	4	OT	Total
Runnin' Bulldogs	0	6	7	7	0	20
Flames	7	0	3	10	3	23

=== At Charleston Southern ===
	1	2	3	4	Total
Runnin' Bulldogs	0	0	7	10	17
#8 Buccaneers	7	0	0	3	10

=== Monmouth ===
	1	2	3	4	OT	Total
Hawks	0	7	6	14	6	33
Runnin' Bulldogs	3	7	10	7	7	34
