= 2016 Saint Francis Red Flash football team =

American college football season

2016 Saint Francis Red Flash football

Northeast Conference co-champion

FCS Playoffs First Round, L 21–31 vs. Villanova
- Conference: Northeast Conference
- Record: 7–5 (5–1 NEC)
- Head coach: Chris Villarrial (7th season)
- Offensive coordinator: Eric Long
- Defensive coordinator: Michael Craig
- Home stadium: DeGol Field

2016 Northeast Conference football standings
	Conf.			Overall
Team	W		L	W		L
Duquesne +	5	–	1	8	–	3
Saint Francis (PA) +^	5	–	1	7	–	5
Wagner	4	–	2	6	–	5
Bryant	4	–	2	5	–	6
Sacred Heart	1	–	5	6	–	5
Central Connecticut	1	–	5	2	–	9
Robert Morris	1	–	5	2	–	9
+ – Conference co-champions; ^ – FCS playoff participant

The 2016 Saint Francis Red Flash football team represented Saint Francis University in the 2016 NCAA Division I FCS football season. They were led by seventh-year head coach Chris Villarrial and played their home games at DeGol Field. They were a member of the Northeast Conference. They finished the season 7–5, 5–1 in NEC play to finish in a tie for the conference title with Duquesne. Due to their head-to-head win over Duquesne, they received the NEC's automatic bid to the FCS Playoffs where they lost in the first round to Villanova.

== Schedule ==
Date	Time	Opponent	Rank	Site	TV	Result	Attendance
September 3	9:00 p.m.	at No. 13 Montana*		Washington–Grizzly Stadium; Missoula, MT	SWX	L 31–41	26,002
September 10	6:00 p.m.	at Towson*		Johnny Unitas Stadium; Towson, MD	TSN	L 28–35	8,069
September 17	1:00 p.m.	at Columbia*		Robert K. Kraft Field at Lawrence A. Wien Stadium; New York, NY	ILDN	W 13–9	4,323
September 24	7:00 p.m.	at No. 22 Albany*		Bob Ford Field at Tom & Mary Casey Stadium; Albany, NY	DZ	L 9–20	6,309
October 1	1:00 p.m.	Malone*		DeGol Field; Loretto, PA	NECFR	W 52–10	1,699
October 8	3:00 p.m.	at Robert Morris		Joe Walton Stadium; Moon Township, PA	ESPN3	W 24–10	2,051
October 15	12:00 p.m.	Bryant		DeGol Field; Loretto, PA	NECFR	W 38–3	1,450
October 21	7:00 p.m.	Duquesne^{†}		DeGol Field; Loretto, PA	ESPN3	W 14–10	1,698
October 29	12:00 p.m.	at Sacred Heart		Campus Field; Fairfield, CT	NECFR	W 38–17	1,716
November 12	12:00 p.m.	Central Connecticut		DeGol Field; Loretto, PA	ESPN3	W 31–21	1,621
November 19	12:00 p.m.	at Wagner	No. 25	Wagner College Stadium; Staten Island, NY	NECFR	L 24–31	2,792
November 26	2:00 p.m.	at No. 9 Villanova*		Villanova Stadium; Villanova, PA (NCAA Division I First Round)	ESPN3	L 21–31	2,059
*Non-conference game; ^{†}Homecoming; Rankings from STATS Poll released prior to the game; All times are in Eastern time

== Games summaries ==
=== At Montana ===
	1	2	3	4	Total
Red Flash	0	10	7	14	31
#13 Grizzlies	3	3	14	21	41

=== At Towson ===
	1	2	3	4	Total
Red Flash	7	21	0	0	28
Tigers	3	10	15	7	35

=== At Columbia ===
	1	2	3	4	Total
Red Flash	3	3	0	7	13
Lions	0	0	3	6	9

=== At Albany ===
	1	2	3	4	Total
Red Flash	0	9	0	0	9
#22 Great Danes	0	0	3	17	20

=== Malone ===
	1	2	3	4	Total
Pioneers	0	3	7	0	10
Red Flash	10	7	14	21	52

=== At Robert Morris ===
	1	2	3	4	Total
Red Flash	10	0	0	7	17
Colonials	0	3	0	7	10

=== Bryant ===
	1	2	3	4	Total
Bulldogs	0	0	3	0	3
Red Flash	7	7	7	17	38

=== Duquesne ===
	1	2	3	4	Total
Dukes	0	3	7	0	10
Red Flash	0	7	0	7	14

=== At Sacred Heart ===
	1	2	3	4	Total
Red Flash	7	10	7	14	38
Pioneers	0	10	7	0	17

=== Central Connecticut ===
	1	2	3	4	Total
Blue Devils	7	7	0	7	21
Red Flash	17	7	7	0	31

=== At Wagner ===
	1	2	3	4	Total
#25 Red Flash	0	0	7	17	24
Seahawks	7	17	7	0	31

== FCS Playoffs ==
=== First Round–Villanova ===
	1	2	3	4	Total
Red Flash	7	0	0	14	21
#9 Wildcats	17	14	0	0	31

== Ranking movements ==
Ranking movements Legend: ██ Increase in ranking ██ Decrease in ranking — = Not ranked RV = Received votes
	Week													
Poll	Pre	1	2	3	4	5	6	7	8	9	10	11	12	Final
STATS FCS	RV	RV	—	—	—	—	—	—	—	RV	RV	25	RV	RV
Coaches	—	—	—	—	—	—	—	—	—	—	RV	RV	RV	RV
