= 2016 Duquesne Dukes football team =

American college football season

2016 Duquesne Dukes football

Northeast Conference co-champion
- Conference: Northeast Conference
- Record: 8–3 (5–1 NEC)
- Head coach: Jerry Schmitt (12th season)
- Offensive coordinator: Anthony Doria
- Defensive coordinator: Dave Opfar
- Home stadium: Arthur J. Rooney Athletic Field

2016 Northeast Conference football standings
	Conf.			Overall
Team	W		L	W		L
Duquesne +	5	–	1	8	–	3
Saint Francis (PA) +^	5	–	1	7	–	5
Wagner	4	–	2	6	–	5
Bryant	4	–	2	5	–	6
Sacred Heart	1	–	5	6	–	5
Central Connecticut	1	–	5	2	–	9
Robert Morris	1	–	5	2	–	9
+ – Conference co-champions; ^ – FCS playoff participant

The 2016 Duquesne Dukes football team represented Duquesne University in the 2016 NCAA Division I FCS football season. They were led by 12th-year head coach Jerry Schmitt and played their home games at Arthur J. Rooney Athletic Field. They were a member of the Northeast Conference. They finished the season 8–3, 5–1 in NEC play to finish in a tie for the conference title with Saint Francis (PA). Due to their head-to-head loss to Saint Francis (PA), they did not receive the NEC's automatic bid to the FCS Playoffs and did not receive an at-large bid.

== Schedule ==
Date	Time	Opponent	Site	TV	Result	Attendance
September 1	7:30 pm	at Youngstown State*	Stambaugh Stadium; Youngstown, OH	ESPN3	L 10–45	12,219
September 10	6:00 pm	Bucknell*	Arthur J. Rooney Athletic Field; Pittsburgh, PA	NECFR	W 30–19	1,943
September 17	12:00 pm	Dayton*	Arthur J. Rooney Athletic Field; Pittsburgh, PA	ESPN3	W 34–20	908
September 24	1:00 pm	Kennesaw State*^{†}	Arthur J. Rooney Athletic Field; Pittsburgh, PA	ESPN3	L 28–36	2,658
October 1	1:00 pm	at Jacksonville*	D. B. Milne Field; Jacksonville, FL	ESPN3	W 54–35	1,661
October 15	7:00 pm	Robert Morris	Arthur J. Rooney Athletic Field; Pittsburgh, PA	ESPN3	W 31–24	1,737
October 21	7:00 pm	at Saint Francis (PA)	DeGol Field; Loretto, PA	ESPN3	L 10–14	1,698
October 29	12:00 pm	Bryant	Arthur J. Rooney Athletic Field; Pittsburgh, PA	NECFR	W 35–31	1,067
November 5	12:00 pm	at Wagner	Wagner College Stadium; Staten Island, NY	NECFR	W 28–20	2,320
November 12	12:00 pm	Sacred Heart	Arthur J. Rooney Athletic Field; Pittsburgh, PA	NECFR	W 31–10	1,012
November 19	12:00 pm	at Central Connecticut	Arute Field; New Britain, CT	NECFR	W 52–19	1,849
*Non-conference game; ^{†}Homecoming; All times are in Eastern time

- Source: Schedule

== Game summaries ==
=== At Youngstown State ===
	1	2	3	4	Total
Dukes	3	7	0	0	10
Penguins	10	14	7	14	45

=== Bucknell ===
	1	2	3	4	Total
Bison	0	0	7	12	19
Dukes	3	10	0	17	30

=== Dayton ===
	1	2	3	4	Total
Flyers	14	6	0	0	20
Dukes	6	9	12	7	34

=== Kennesaw State ===
	1	2	3	4	Total
Owls	6	10	6	14	36
Dukes	7	10	3	8	28

=== At Jacksonville ===
	1	2	3	4	Total
Dukes	10	10	21	13	54
Dolphins	7	7	14	7	35

=== Robert Morris ===
	1	2	3	4	Total
Colonials	7	10	7	0	24
Dukes	7	10	7	7	31

=== At Saint Francis (PA) ===
	1	2	3	4	Total
Dukes	0	3	7	0	10
Red Flash	0	7	0	7	14

=== Bryant ===
	1	2	3	4	Total
Bulldogs	7	17	0	7	31
Dukes	7	7	14	7	35

=== At Wagner ===
	1	2	3	4	Total
Dukes	7	7	7	7	28
Seahawks	10	7	3	0	20

=== Sacred Heart ===
	1	2	3	4	Total
Pioneers	0	3	7	0	10
Dukes	7	7	10	7	31

=== At Central Connecticut ===
	1	2	3	4	Total
Dukes	21	10	7	14	52
Blue Devils	3	16	0	0	19
