= 2016 San Diego Toreros football team =

American college football season

2016 San Diego Toreros football

PFL champion

NCAA Division I Second Round, L 7–45 vs. North Dakota State
- Conference: Pioneer Football League

Ranking
- STATS: No. 19
- FCS Coaches: No. T–21
- Record: 10–2 (8–0 PFL)
- Head coach: Dale Lindsey (4th season)
- Offensive coordinator: Tanner Engstrand (6th season)
- Defensive coordinator: Steve Irvin (4th season)
- Home stadium: Torero Stadium

2016 Pioneer Football League standings
	Conf.			Overall
Team	W		L	W		L
No. 19 San Diego $^	8	–	0	10	–	2
Dayton	7	–	1	9	–	2
Drake	6	–	2	7	–	4
Marist	5	–	3	5	–	6
Jacksonville	4	–	3	5	–	5
Campbell	3	–	4	5	–	5
Morehead State	3	–	5	4	–	7
Valparaiso	3	–	5	4	–	7
Butler	2	–	6	4	–	7
Stetson	2	–	6	4	–	7
Davidson	0	–	8	2	–	9
$ – Conference champion; ^ – FCS playoff participant; Rankings from STATS Poll

The 2016 San Diego Toreros football team represented the University of San Diego as a member of the Pioneer Football League (PFL) during the 2016 NCAA Division I FCS football season. Led by fourth-year head coach Dale Lindsey, the Toreros compiled an overall record of 10–2 with a mark of 8–0 in conference play, winning the PFL title. San Diego earned the conference's automatic bid to the NCAA Division I Football Championship playoffs, where the Toreros defeated Cal Poly in the first round before losing in the second round to North Dakota State. The team played home games at Torero Stadium in San Diego.

== Schedule ==
Date	Time	Opponent	Rank	Site	TV	Result	Attendance
September 3	6:00 pm	Western New Mexico*		Torero Stadium; San Diego, CA	TheW.tv	W 27–0	2,567
September 10	4:00 pm	at Cal Poly*		Alex G. Spanos Stadium; San Luis Obispo, CA	GoPoly	L 16–38	6,251
September 24	4:00 pm	Dayton		Torero Stadium; San Diego, CA	TheW.tv	W 34–22	2,119
October 1	10:00 am	at Butler		Butler Bowl; Indianapolis, IN	BAA	W 44–10	2,408
October 8	1:00 pm	Davidson^{†}		Torero Stadium; San Diego, CA	TheW.tv	W 52–3	2,827
October 15	10:30 am	at Drake		Drake Stadium; Des Moines, IA	BV	W 38–7	1,740
October 22	1:00 pm	Valparaiso		Torero Stadium; San Diego, CA	TheW.tv	W 49–10	2,222
October 29	10:00 am	at Marist		Tenney Stadium at Leonidoff Field; Poughkeepsie, NY	RFN	W 27–3	1,604
November 5	4:00 pm	UDLAP‡*		Torero Stadium; San Diego, CA	TheW.tv	W 49–25	1,786
November 12	1:00 pm	Stetson		Torero Stadium; San Diego, CA	TheW.tv	W 42–7	2,288
November 19	9:00 am	at Campbell		Barker–Lane Stadium; Buies Creek, NC	BSN	W 57–21	4,121
November 26	4:00 pm	at No. 21 Cal Poly*	No. 24	Alex G. Spanos Stadium; San Luis Obispo, CA (NCAA Division I First Round)	ESPN3	W 35–21	3,356
December 3	12:30 pm	at No. 4 North Dakota State*	No. 24	Fargodome; Fargo, ND (NCAA Division I Second Round)	ESPN3	L 7–45	18,305
*Non-conference game; ^{†}Homecoming; ‡Exhibition game that does not affect overall record; Rankings from STATS Poll released prior to the game; All times are in Pacific time

== Ranking movements ==
Ranking movements Legend: ██ Increase in ranking ██ Decrease in ranking — = Not ranked RV = Received votes т = Tied with team above or below
	Week													
Poll	Pre	1	2	3	4	5	6	7	8	9	10	11	12	Final
STATS FCS	RV	RV	—	—	—	RV	RV	RV	RV	RV	RV	RV	24	19
Coaches	RV	RV	—	—	—	—	RV	RV	RV	RV	RV	RV	25	21–T

== Game summaries ==
=== Western New Mexico ===
	1	2	3	4	Total
Mustangs	0	0	0	0	0
Toreros	3	7	10	7	27

=== At Cal Poly ===
	1	2	3	4	Total
Toreros	0	13	0	3	16
Mustangs	10	7	14	7	38

=== Dayton ===
	1	2	3	4	Total
Flyers	0	7	7	8	22
Toreros	7	0	14	13	34

=== At Butler ===
	1	2	3	4	Total
Toreros	14	3	7	20	44
Bulldogs	0	0	3	7	10

=== Davidson ===
	1	2	3	4	Total
Wildcats	0	0	0	3	3
Toreros	28	14	10	0	52

=== At Drake ===
	1	2	3	4	Total
Toreros	7	17	14	0	38
Bulldogs	0	0	0	7	7

=== Valparaiso ===
	1	2	3	4	Total
Crusaders	3	0	0	7	10
Toreros	14	14	14	7	49

=== At Marist ===
	1	2	3	4	Total
Toreros	7	6	0	14	27
Red Foxes	0	3	0	0	3

=== Universidad De Las Americas Puebla ===
	1	2	3	4	Total
Aztecas	7	0	10	8	25
Toreros	7	28	0	14	49

- This was an exhibition game and had no effect on San Diego's overall record.

=== Stetson ===
	1	2	3	4	Total
Hatters	7	0	0	0	7
Toreros	7	21	7	7	42

=== At Campbell ===
	1	2	3	4	Total
Toreros	7	16	20	14	57
Fighting Camels	7	7	7	0	21

=== Cal Poly—NCAA Division I First Round ===
	1	2	3	4	Total
#24 Toreros	14	0	7	14	35
#21 Mustangs	0	7	7	7	21

=== North Dakota State—NCAA Division I Second Round ===
	1	2	3	4	Total
#24 Toreros	0	0	7	0	7
#4 Bison	7	14	7	17	45

== Roster ==
2016 San Diego Toreros football team roster
Players
Coaches
Offense

Pos.	#	Name	Class
RB	6	Blake Martin	Jr
QB	7	Reid Sinnett	Fr
WR	8	Justin Priest	Jr
WR	9	Nate Loya	So
QB	10	Alex Farina	Fr
QB	15	Mason Randall	Fr
WR	16	Grant Hill	So
QB	18	Anthony Lawrence	So
FB	24	Kyle Pawuk	Fr
NB	32	Scott Lewis	Fr
RB	34	Jordan Charles	Fr
RB	35	Griffin Intrieri	Fr
TE	42	Zack Holland	Jr
FB	44	Zach Nelson	Fr
OL	53	Jake Arlotti	So
OL	55	Miles McArdle	Jr
OL	56	Trevor Provencio	So
OL	57	Jake Michaels	Fr
OL	60	Nolan Bisogno	Fr
OL	61	Preston Orellana	Fr
OL	63	Aidan Valencia	Fr
OL	65	Tanner Wilkey	Fr
OL	68	Joe Hurney	Jr
OL	71	Spencer Seeley	Jr
OL	73	Marcus Goforth	Fr
OL	75	Daniel Cooney	So
OL	79	Ricky Laureano	Jr
WR	83	Brant Berglund	Jr
TE	85	Ross Dwelley	Jr
WR	86	Jacob Arnell	Sr
WR	87	Michael Bandy	Fr
WR	89	Michael Keating	Fr

Defense

Pos.	#	Name	Class
LB	14	Jacob Bergstrom	Fr
CB	17	Kishan Patel	Jr
CB	19	Bryan Kelly	Fr
S	20	Jack Michael	Fr
S	21	Colton Giorgi	Jr
CB	23	Cameron Record	Fr
CB	25	David Tolbert	Fr
CB	27	Arrion Archie	So
S	28	Ray Clark	Jr
LB	30	Brian Doyle	Fr
CB	33	Daniel Tolbert	Fr
LB	37	K. J. Mahoney	So
S	40	Riley Reyes	Fr
CB	47	Brady McMillan	Fr
LB	58	Marcus Vaivao	So
NB	59	Max Michaels	Jr
DL	62	Chris Reese	Fr
DL	67	Shey Newton	Fr
DL	72	Jared Pu'u-Robinson	Fr
DL	74	Nick Friedel	Fr
DL	76	Kevin Glajchen	Fr
S	82	Kaene Soto	Fr
DL	90	Jake Wittwer	So
DL	91	Aaron Laut	So
DE	95	Jonathan Petersen	Jr
DL	96	Creighton Morfitt	Fr
DL	99	Connor Spencer	So

Special teams

Pos.	#	Name	Class
K	12	Tim Hemmersmeier	Fr
K	39	Patrick Murray	Jr
K, P	48	Jack Flatau	Jr

Head coach

- Dale Lindsey

Coordinators/assistant coaches

Legend

- (C) Team captain
- (S) Suspended
- (I) Ineligible
- Injured
- Redshirt

Roster
