= 2016 Monmouth Hawks football team =

American college football season

2016 Monmouth Hawks football
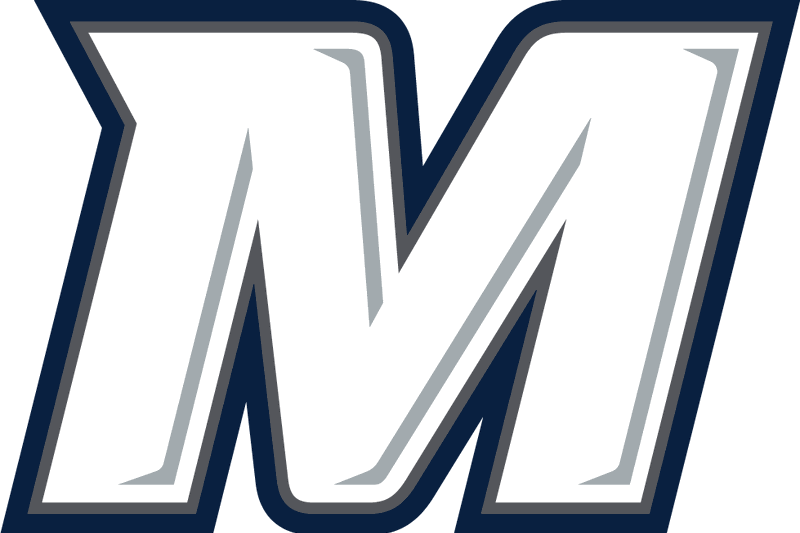
- Conference: Big South Conference
- Record: 4–7 (0–5 Big South)
- Head coach: Kevin Callahan (24th season)
- Offensive coordinator: Kevin Morris (3rd season)
- Offensive scheme: Pro-style
- Defensive coordinator: Andy Bobik (23rd season)
- Base defense: 4–3
- Home stadium: Kessler Field

2016 Big South Conference football standings
	Conf.			Overall
Team	W		L	W		L
No. 15 Charleston Southern +^	4	–	1	7	–	4
Liberty +	4	–	1	6	–	5
Kennesaw State	3	–	2	8	–	3
Gardner–Webb	3	–	2	5	–	6
Presbyterian	1	–	4	2	–	9
Monmouth	0	–	5	4	–	7
+ – Conference co-champions; ^ – FCS playoff participant; Rankings from STATS Poll

The 2016 Monmouth Hawks football team represented Monmouth University in the 2016 NCAA Division I FCS football season as a member of the Big South Conference. They were led by 24th-year head coach Kevin Callahan and played their home games at Kessler Field. Monmouth finished the season 4–7 overall and 0–5 in Big South play to place sixth.

== Schedule ==
Date	Time	Opponent	Site	TV	Result	Attendance
September 3	12:30 p.m.	at Lehigh*	Goodman Stadium; Bethlehem, PA	SE2	W 23–21	4,828
September 10	5:00 p.m.	at Delaware State*	Alumni Stadium; Dover, DE	ESPN3	W 34–20	2,454
September 17	3:30 p.m.	at Kent State*	Dix Stadium; Kent, OH	ESPN3	L 7–27	14,265
September 24	1:00 p.m.	No. 12 Charleston Southern	Kessler Field; West Long Branch, NJ	ESPN3	L 7–35	2,801
October 1	1:00 p.m.	Fordham*	Kessler Field; West Long Branch, NJ	ESPN3	W 42–41 ^{OT}	2,847
October 8	1:00 p.m.	at Howard*	William H. Greene Stadium; Washington, D.C.	ESPN3	W 59–27	453
October 13	7:00 p.m.	at Presbyterian	Bailey Memorial Stadium; Clinton, SC	ESPN3	L 13–17	2,350
October 22	3:30 p.m.	at Liberty	Williams Stadium; Lynchburg, VA	ESPN3	L 28–52	16,687
October 29	1:00 p.m.	Kennesaw State	Kessler Field; West Long Branch, NJ	ESPN3	L 17–49	3,869
November 5	2:00 p.m.	at No. 18 Coastal Carolina*	Brooks Stadium; Conway, SC	ESPN3	L 17–38	7,123
November 19	1:30 p.m.	at Gardner–Webb	Ernest W. Spangler Stadium; Boiling Springs, NC	ESPN3	L 33–34 ^{OT}	3,380
*Non-conference game; Rankings from STATS Poll released prior to the game; All times are in Eastern time

== Game summaries ==
=== At Lehigh ===
	1	2	3	4	Total
Hawks	0	7	7	9	23
Mountain Hawks	0	0	7	14	21

=== At Delaware State ===
	1	2	3	4	Total
Hawks	7	10	10	7	34
Hornets	0	0	13	7	20

=== At Kent State ===
	1	2	3	4	Total
Hawks	0	0	0	7	7
Golden Flashes	3	10	7	7	27

=== Charleston Southern ===
	1	2	3	4	Total
#12 Buccaneers	0	7	14	14	35
Hawks	0	0	7	0	7

=== Fordham ===
	1	2	3	4	OT	Total
Rams	13	14	0	7	7	41
Hawks	3	10	7	14	8	42

=== At Howard ===
	1	2	3	4	Total
Hawks	10	21	21	7	59
Bison	7	7	6	7	27

=== At Presbyterian ===
	1	2	3	4	Total
Hawks	0	7	6	0	13
Blue Hose	0	7	3	7	17

=== At Liberty ===
	1	2	3	4	Total
Hawks	0	7	14	7	28
Flames	14	17	7	14	52

=== Kennesaw State ===
	1	2	3	4	Total
Owls	7	14	21	7	49
Hawks	3	14	0	0	17

=== At Coastal Carolina ===
	1	2	3	4	Total
Hawks	10	7	0	0	17
#18 Chanticleers	3	7	14	14	38

=== At Gardner–Webb ===
	1	2	3	4	OT	Total
Hawks	0	7	6	14	6	33
Runnin' Bulldogs	3	7	10	7	7	34
