= 2016 Bryant Bulldogs football team =

American college football season

2016 Bryant Bulldogs football
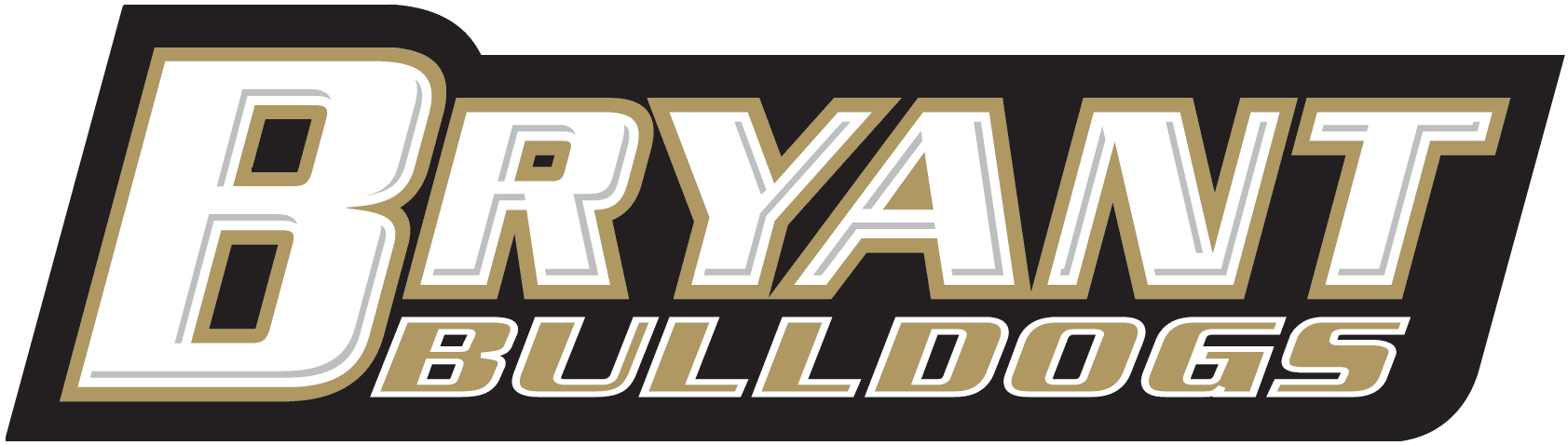
- Conference: Northeast Conference
- Record: 5–6 (4–2 NEC)
- Head coach: Marty Fine (13th season)
- Defensive coordinator: Greg Gigantino (10th season)
- Home stadium: Bulldog/Beirne Stadium

2016 Northeast Conference football standings
	Conf.			Overall
Team	W		L	W		L
Duquesne +	5	–	1	8	–	3
Saint Francis (PA) +^	5	–	1	7	–	5
Wagner	4	–	2	6	–	5
Bryant	4	–	2	5	–	6
Sacred Heart	1	–	5	6	–	5
Central Connecticut	1	–	5	2	–	9
Robert Morris	1	–	5	2	–	9
+ – Conference co-champions; ^ – FCS playoff participant

The 2016 Bryant Bulldogs football team represented Bryant University as a member of the Northeast Conference (NEC) during the 2016 NCAA Division I FCS football season. Led by Marty Fine in his 13th and final season as head coach, the Bulldogs compiled an overall record of 5–6 with a mark of 4–2 in conference play, tying for third place in the NEC. Bryant played home games at Beirne Stadium in Smithfield, Rhode Island. The stadium was renamed from "Bulldog Stadium" on September 25.

On December 1, Fine resigned as head coach. He finished his 13-year tenure at Bryant with a record of 80–61.

== Schedule ==
Date	Time	Opponent	Site	TV	Result	Attendance
September 3	3:00 p.m.	Merrimack*	Bulldog Stadium; Smithfield, RI	NECFR	W 41–20	4,277
September 10	4:05 p.m.	at Montana State*	Bobcat Stadium; Bozeman, MT		L 24–27	18,867
September 17	1:00 p.m.	Brown*	Bulldog Stadium; Smithfield, RI	NECFR	L 27–35	4,116
September 24	1:00 p.m.	Central Connecticut^{†}	Beirne Stadium; Smithfield, RI	ESPN3	W 45–25	4,514
October 1	3:30 p.m.	at Maine*	Alfond Stadium; Orono, ME	FCS	L 31–35	7,266
October 15	12:00 p.m.	at Saint Francis (PA)	DeGol Field; Loretto, PA	NECFR	L 3–38	1,450
October 22	1:00 p.m.	Wagner	Beirne Stadium; Smithfield, RI	NECFR	W 27–17	3,867
October 29	12:00 p.m.	at Duquesne	Arthur J. Rooney Athletic Field; Pittsburgh, PA	NECFR	L 31–35	1,067
November 5	12:00 p.m.	Robert Morris	Beirne Stadium; Smithfield, RI	NECFR	W 24–13	2,362
November 12	2:00 p.m.	at No. 15 Coastal Carolina*	Brooks Stadium; Conway, SC	CSN	L 21–31	6,528
November 19	12:00 p.m.	at Sacred Heart	Campus Field; Fairfield, CT	ESPN3	W 42–34	2,015
*Non-conference game; ^{†}Homecoming; Rankings from STATS Poll released prior to the game; All times are in Eastern time

== Game summaries ==
=== Merrimack ===
	1	2	3	4	Total
Warriors	3	10	0	7	20
Bulldogs	8	13	14	6	41

=== At Montana State ===
	1	2	3	4	Total
Bulldogs	3	7	7	7	24
Bobcats	0	14	13	0	27

=== Brown ===
	1	2	3	4	Total
Bears	0	14	21	0	35
Bulldogs	21	0	6	0	27

=== Central Connecticut ===
	1	2	3	4	Total
Blue Devils	3	0	8	14	25
Bulldogs	7	21	10	7	45

=== At Maine ===
	1	2	3	4	Total
Bulldogs	14	7	10	0	31
Black Bears	0	7	21	7	35

=== At Saint Francis (PA) ===
	1	2	3	4	Total
Bulldogs	0	3	0	0	3
Red Flash	7	7	7	17	38

=== Wagner ===
	1	2	3	4	Total
Seahawks	0	7	3	7	17
Bulldogs	3	7	10	7	27

=== At Duquesne ===
	1	2	3	4	Total
Bulldogs	7	17	0	7	31
Dukes	7	7	14	7	35

=== Robert Morris ===
	1	2	3	4	Total
Colonials	0	3	10	0	13
Bulldogs	0	10	0	14	24

=== At Coastal Carolina ===
	1	2	3	4	Total
Bulldogs	7	7	7	0	21
#15 Chanticleers	6	3	7	15	31

=== At Sacred Heart ===
	1	2	3	4	Total
Bulldogs	14	14	14	0	42
Pioneers	14	3	10	7	34
