= 2016 Butler Bulldogs football team =

American college football season

2016 Butler Bulldogs football
- Conference: Pioneer Football League
- Record: 4–7 (2–6 PFL)
- Head coach: Jeff Voris (11th season)
- Co-defensive coordinators: Joe Cheshire (7th season); Tim Cooper (7th season)
- Home stadium: Butler Bowl

2016 Pioneer Football League standings
	Conf.			Overall
Team	W		L	W		L
No. 19 San Diego $^	8	–	0	10	–	2
Dayton	7	–	1	9	–	2
Drake	6	–	2	7	–	4
Marist	5	–	3	5	–	6
Jacksonville	4	–	3	5	–	5
Campbell	3	–	4	5	–	5
Morehead State	3	–	5	4	–	7
Valparaiso	3	–	5	4	–	7
Butler	2	–	6	4	–	7
Stetson	2	–	6	4	–	7
Davidson	0	–	8	2	–	9
$ – Conference champion; ^ – FCS playoff participant; Rankings from STATS Poll

The 2016 Butler Bulldogs football team represented Butler University as a member of the Pioneer Football League (PFL) during the 2016 NCAA Division I FCS football season. Led by 11th-year head coach Jeff Voris, Bulldogs compiled an overall record of 4–7 with a mark of 2–6 in conference play, tying for ninth place in the PFL. Butler played home games at the Butler Bowl in Indianapolis.

== Schedule ==
Date	Time	Opponent	Site	TV	Result	Attendance
September 3	3:00 pm	at Indiana State*	Memorial Stadium; Terre Haute, IN	ESPN3	L 25–41	5,625
September 10	6:30 pm	Franklin (IN)*	Butler Bowl; Indianapolis, IN	BAA	W 59–14	4,732
September 17	7:00 pm	at Taylor*	Turner Stadium; Upland, IN	BAA	W 27–14	2,718
September 24	6:00 pm	at Campbell	Barker–Lane Stadium; Buies Creek, NC	BSN	L 27–33 ^{OT}	6,610
October 1	1:00 pm	San Diego	Butler Bowl; Indianapolis, IN	BAA	L 10–44	2,408
October 8	1:00 pm	Marist^{†}	Butler Bowl; Indianapolis, IN	BAA	L 21–30	5,236
October 15	12:00 pm	at Davidson	Richardson Stadium; Davidson, NC	DAA	W 20–17	2,917
October 22	1:00 pm	Dayton	Butler Bowl; Indianapolis, IN	BAA	L 16–31	3,260
October 29	1:00 pm	at Valparaiso	Brown Field; Valparaiso, IN (Hoosier Helmet Trophy)	ESPN3	W 23–12	2,141
November 5	1:00 pm	Morehead State	Butler Bowl; Indianapolis, IN	BAA	L 28–54	4,896
November 12	2:00 pm	at Drake	Drake Stadium; Des Moines, IA	BV	L 14–28	1,897
*Non-conference game; ^{†}Homecoming; All times are in Eastern time

== Game summaries ==
=== At Indiana State ===
	1	2	3	4	Total
Bulldogs	0	6	6	13	25
Sycamores	14	3	21	3	41

=== Franklin ===
	1	2	3	4	Total
Grizzlies	0	14	0	0	14
Bulldogs	21	21	10	7	59

=== At Taylor ===
	1	2	3	4	Total
Bulldogs	7	7	3	10	27
Trojans	0	7	7	0	14

=== At Campbell ===
	1	2	3	4	OT	Total
Bulldogs	0	10	7	10	0	27
Fighting Camels	0	20	0	7	6	33

=== San Diego ===
	1	2	3	4	Total
Toreros	14	3	7	20	44
Bulldogs	0	0	3	7	10

=== Marist ===
	1	2	3	4	Total
Red Foxes	0	20	0	10	30
Bulldogs	7	7	7	0	21

=== At Davidson ===
	1	2	3	4	Total
Bulldogs	0	7	7	6	20
Wildcats	7	7	3	0	17

=== Dayton ===
	1	2	3	4	Total
Flyers	14	14	3	0	31
Bulldogs	0	3	7	6	16

=== At Valparaiso ===
	1	2	3	4	Total
Bulldogs	10	3	0	10	23
Crusaders	6	6	0	0	12

=== Morehead State ===
	1	2	3	4	Total
Eagles	10	24	10	10	54
Bulldogs	0	7	7	14	28

=== At Drake ===
	1	2	3	4	Total
BU Bulldogs	0	7	7	0	14
DU Bulldogs	7	7	14	0	28
