= 2016 Sacred Heart Pioneers football team =

American college football season

2016 Sacred Heart Pioneers football
- Conference: Northeast Conference
- Record: 6–5 (1–5 NEC)
- Head coach: Mark Nofri (5th season)
- Offensive coordinator: Kevin Bolis (6th season)
- Defensive coordinator: Dave Wissman (6th season)
- Home stadium: Campus Field

2016 Northeast Conference football standings
	Conf.			Overall
Team	W		L	W		L
Duquesne +	5	–	1	8	–	3
Saint Francis (PA) +^	5	–	1	7	–	5
Wagner	4	–	2	6	–	5
Bryant	4	–	2	5	–	6
Sacred Heart	1	–	5	6	–	5
Central Connecticut	1	–	5	2	–	9
Robert Morris	1	–	5	2	–	9
+ – Conference co-champions; ^ – FCS playoff participant

The 2016 Sacred Heart Pioneers football team represented Sacred Heart University as a member of the Northeast Conference (NEC) during the 2016 NCAA Division I FCS football season. Led by fifth-year head coach Mark Nofri, the Pioneers compiled an overall record of 6–5 with a mark of 1–5 in conference play, placing in a three-way tie for fifth place in the NEC. Sacred Heart played home games at Campus Field in Fairfield, Connecticut.

== Schedule ==
Date	Time	Opponent	Site	TV	Result	Attendance
September 3	7:00 p.m.	at Stetson*	Spec Martin Stadium; DeLand, FL	ESPN3	W 18–14	2,900
September 10	1:00 p.m.	Valparaiso*	Campus Field; Fairfield, CT	NECFR	W 42–14	2,406
September 17	5:00 p.m.	Marist*	Campus Field; Fairfield, CT	NECFR	W 31–6	3,293
September 24	6:00 p.m.	at No. 20 Stony Brook*	Kenneth P. LaValle Stadium; Stony Brook, NY	SHU Live	W 38–10	7,833
October 1	6:00 p.m.	at Wagner	Wagner College Stadium; Staten Island, NY	ESPN3	L 20–45	3,002
October 15	12:00 p.m.	at Cornell*	Schoellkopf Field; Ithaca, NY	ILDN	W 31–24	6,739
October 22	12:00 p.m.	Robert Morris	Campus Field; Fairfield, CT	NECFR	W 16–10	2,446
October 29	12:00 p.m.	Saint Francis (PA)	Campus Field; Fairfield, CT	NECFR	L 17–38	1,716
November 5	12:00 p.m.	at Central Connecticut	Arute Field; New Britain, CT	NECFR	L 35–37	2,217
November 12	12:00 p.m.	at Duquesne	Arthur J. Rooney Athletic Field; Pittsburgh, PA	NECFR	L 10–31	1,012
November 19	12:00 p.m.	Bryant	Campus Field; Fairfield, CT	ESPN3	L 34–42	2,015
*Non-conference game; Rankings from STATS Poll released prior to the game; All times are in Eastern time

== Game summaries ==
=== At Stetson ===
	1	2	3	4	Total
Pioneers	6	0	6	6	18
Hatters	7	7	0	0	14

=== Valparaiso ===
	1	2	3	4	Total
Crusaders	7	7	0	0	14
Pioneers	7	28	7	0	42

=== Marist ===
	1	2	3	4	Total
Red Foxes	3	3	0	0	6
Pioneers	0	14	10	7	31

=== At Stony Brook ===
	1	2	3	4	Total
Pioneers	7	3	14	14	38
#20 Seawolves	7	3	0	0	10

=== At Wagner ===
	1	2	3	4	Total
Pioneers	6	14	0	0	20
Seahawks	12	27	0	6	45

=== At Cornell ===
	1	2	3	4	Total
Pioneers	14	10	7	0	31
Big Red	7	3	7	7	24

=== Robert Morris ===
	1	2	3	4	Total
Colonials	7	0	0	3	10
Pioneers	6	3	7	0	16

=== Saint Francis (PA) ===
	1	2	3	4	Total
Red Flash	7	10	7	14	38
Pioneers	0	10	7	0	17

=== At Central Connecticut ===
	1	2	3	4	Total
Pioneers	7	0	14	14	35
Blue Devils	7	10	14	6	37

=== At Duquesne ===
	1	2	3	4	Total
Pioneers	0	3	7	0	10
Dukes	7	7	10	7	31

=== Bryant ===
	1	2	3	4	Total
Bulldogs	14	14	14	0	42
Pioneers	14	3	10	7	34
