= 2016 Dayton Flyers football team =

American college football season

2016 Dayton Flyers football
- Conference: Pioneer Football League
- Record: 9–2 (7–1 PFL)
- Head coach: Rick Chamberlin (9th season)
- Offensive coordinator: Eric Evans (3rd season)
- Defensive coordinator: Landon Fox (7th season)
- Home stadium: Welcome Stadium

2016 Pioneer Football League standings
	Conf.			Overall
Team	W		L	W		L
No. 19 San Diego $^	8	–	0	10	–	2
Dayton	7	–	1	9	–	2
Drake	6	–	2	7	–	4
Marist	5	–	3	5	–	6
Jacksonville	4	–	3	5	–	5
Campbell	3	–	4	5	–	5
Morehead State	3	–	5	4	–	7
Valparaiso	3	–	5	4	–	7
Butler	2	–	6	4	–	7
Stetson	2	–	6	4	–	7
Davidson	0	–	8	2	–	9
$ – Conference champion; ^ – FCS playoff participant; Rankings from STATS Poll

The 2016 Dayton Flyers football team represented the University of Dayton as a member of the Pioneer Football League (PFL) during the 2016 NCAA Division I FCS football season. Led by ninth-year head coach Rick Chamberlin, the Flyers compiled an overall record of 9–2 with a mark of 7–1 in conference play, placing second in the PFL. Dayton played home games at Welcome Stadium in Dayton, Ohio.

== Schedule ==
Date	Time	Opponent	Site	TV	Result	Attendance
September 3	7:00 pm	Central State (OH)*	Welcome Stadium; Dayton, OH	YouTube	W 31–19	4,003
September 10	1:00 pm	Robert Morris*	Welcome Stadium; Dayton, OH	TWCS	W 13–0	2,357
September 17	12:00 pm	at Duquesne*	Arthur J. Rooney Athletic Field; Pittsburgh, PA	ESPN3	L 20–34	908
September 24	7:00 pm	at San Diego	Torero Stadium; San Diego, CA	TheW.tv	L 22–34	2,119
October 1	1:00 pm	Drake	Welcome Stadium; Dayton, OH (rivalry)	YouTube	W 35–10	2,457
October 8	1:00 pm	Morehead State	Welcome Stadium; Dayton, OH	TWCS	W 51–27	2,440
October 15	1:00 pm	at Jacksonville	D. B. Milne Field; Jacksonville, FL	ESPN3	W 36–16	1,518
October 22	1:00 pm	at Butler	Butler Bowl; Indianapolis, IN	BAA	W 31–16	3,260
October 29	1:00 pm	Stetson	Welcome Stadium; Dayton, OH	TWCS	W 21–10	2,045
November 5	1:00 pm	Valparaiso	Welcome Stadium; Dayton, OH	TWCS	W 37–21	4,193
November 12	1:00 pm	at Marist	Tenney Stadium at Leonidoff Field; Poughkeepsie, NY	RFN, TWCS	W 59–31	1,734
*Non-conference game; All times are in Eastern time

== Game summaries ==
=== Central State ===
	1	2	3	4	Total
Marauders	0	0	0	19	19
Flyers	7	14	10	0	31

=== Robert Morris ===
	1	2	3	4	Total
Colonials	0	0	0	0	0
Flyers	0	10	3	0	13

=== @ Duquesne ===
	1	2	3	4	Total
Flyers	14	6	0	0	20
Dukes	6	9	12	7	34

=== @ San Diego ===
	1	2	3	4	Total
Flyers	0	7	7	8	22
Toreros	7	0	14	13	34

=== Drake ===
	1	2	3	4	Total
Bulldogs	0	3	7	0	10
Flyers	14	7	7	7	35

=== Morehead State ===
	1	2	3	4	Total
Eagles	0	7	13	7	27
Flyers	0	24	6	21	51

=== @ Jacksonville ===
	1	2	3	4	Total
Flyers	0	27	3	6	36
Dolphins	3	0	13	0	16

=== @ Butler ===
	1	2	3	4	Total
Flyers	14	14	3	0	31
Bulldogs	0	3	7	6	16

=== Stetson ===
	1	2	3	4	Total
Hatters	3	0	0	7	10
Flyers	7	7	0	7	21

=== Valparaiso ===
	1	2	3	4	Total
Crusaders	7	0	0	14	21
Flyers	14	10	13	0	37

=== @ Marist ===
	1	2	3	4	Total
Flyers	17	14	7	21	59
Red Foxes	3	14	7	7	31
