= 2016 Robert Morris Colonials football team =

American college football season

2016 Robert Morris Colonials football
- Conference: Northeast Conference
- Record: 2–9 (1–5 NEC)
- Head coach: John Banaszak (3rd season)
- Offensive coordinator: Mike Miller (1st season)
- Defensive coordinator: Scott Farison (9th season)
- Home stadium: Joe Walton Stadium

2016 Northeast Conference football standings
	Conf.			Overall
Team	W		L	W		L
Duquesne +	5	–	1	8	–	3
Saint Francis (PA) +^	5	–	1	7	–	5
Wagner	4	–	2	6	–	5
Bryant	4	–	2	5	–	6
Sacred Heart	1	–	5	6	–	5
Central Connecticut	1	–	5	2	–	9
Robert Morris	1	–	5	2	–	9
+ – Conference co-champions; ^ – FCS playoff participant

The 2016 Robert Morris Colonials football team represented Robert Morris University during the 2016 NCAA Division I FCS football season. They were led by third-year head coach John Banaszak and played their home games at Joe Walton Stadium. They were a member of the Northeast Conference. They finished with a record of 2–9, 1–5 in NEC play, to finish in a three-way tie for fifth place.

== Schedule ==
Date	Time	Opponent	Site	TV	Result	Attendance
September 1	7:00 p.m.	Alderson Broaddus*	Joe Walton Stadium; Moon Township, PA	NECFR	L 7–14	2,336
September 10	1:00 p.m.	at Dayton*	Welcome Stadium; Dayton, OH	TWCS	L 0–13	2,357
September 17	4:00 p.m.	at No. 20 Youngstown State*	Stambaugh Stadium; Youngstown, OH	ESPN3	L 6–38	19,033
September 24	7:00 p.m.	Malone*	Joe Walton Stadium; Moon Township, PA	NECFR	W 21–19	2,247
October 1	7:00 p.m.	at Liberty*	Williams Stadium; Lynchburg, VA	ESPN3	L 7–41	11,273
October 8	3:00 p.m.	Saint Francis (PA)^{†}	Joe Walton Stadium; Moon Township, PA	ESPN3	L 10–24	2,051
October 15	7:00 p.m.	at Duquesne	Arthur J. Rooney Athletic Field; Pittsburgh, PA	ESPN3	L 24–31	1,737
October 22	12:00 p.m.	at Sacred Heart	Campus Field; Fairfield, CT	NECFR	L 10–16	2,446
October 29	12:00 p.m.	Central Connecticut	Joe Walton Stadium; Moon Township, PA	NECFR	W 19–6	1,918
November 5	12:00 p.m.	at Bryant	Beirne Stadium; Smithfield, RI	NECFR	L 13–24	2,362
November 12	12:00 p.m.	Wagner	Joe Walton Stadium; Moon Township, PA	NECFR	L 5–40	1,503
*Non-conference game; ^{†}Homecoming; Rankings from STATS Poll released prior to the game; All times are in Eastern time

== Game summaries ==
=== Alderson Broaddus ===
	1	2	3	4	Total
Battlers	14	0	0	0	14
Colonials	7	0	0	0	7

=== At Dayton ===
	1	2	3	4	Total
Colonials	0	0	0	0	0
Flyers	0	10	3	0	13

=== At Youngstown State ===
	1	2	3	4	Total
Colonials	0	0	6	0	6
#20 Penguins	14	3	14	7	38

=== Malone ===
	1	2	3	4	Total
Pioneers	0	6	7	6	19
Colonials	7	7	7	0	21

=== At Liberty ===
	1	2	3	4	Total
Colonials	7	0	0	0	7
Flames	7	14	10	10	41

=== Saint Francis (PA) ===
	1	2	3	4	Total
Red Flash	10	0	7	7	24
Colonials	0	3	0	7	10

=== At Duquesne ===
	1	2	3	4	Total
Colonials	7	10	7	0	24
Dukes	7	10	7	7	31

=== At Sacred Heart ===
	1	2	3	4	Total
Colonials	7	0	0	3	10
Pioneers	6	3	7	0	16

=== Central Connecticut ===
	1	2	3	4	Total
Blue Devils	0	0	0	6	6
Colonials	2	7	3	7	19

=== At Bryant ===
	1	2	3	4	Total
Colonials	0	3	10	0	13
Bulldogs	0	10	0	14	24

=== Wagner ===
	1	2	3	4	Total
Seahawks	10	17	13	0	40
Colonials	3	0	2	0	5
