= 2016 Morehead State Eagles football team =

American college football season

2016 Morehead State Eagles football
- Conference: Pioneer Football League
- Record: 4–7 (3–5 PFL)
- Head coach: Rob Tenyer (4th season)
- Offensive coordinator: Patrick St. Louis
- Defensive coordinator: Zack Moore (1st season)
- Home stadium: Jayne Stadium

2016 Pioneer Football League standings
	Conf.			Overall
Team	W		L	W		L
No. 19 San Diego $^	8	–	0	10	–	2
Dayton	7	–	1	9	–	2
Drake	6	–	2	7	–	4
Marist	5	–	3	5	–	6
Jacksonville	4	–	3	5	–	5
Campbell	3	–	4	5	–	5
Morehead State	3	–	5	4	–	7
Valparaiso	3	–	5	4	–	7
Butler	2	–	6	4	–	7
Stetson	2	–	6	4	–	7
Davidson	0	–	8	2	–	9
$ – Conference champion; ^ – FCS playoff participant; Rankings from STATS Poll

The 2016 Morehead State Eagles football team represented Morehead State University in the 2016 NCAA Division I FCS football season. They were led by fourth-year head coach Rob Tenyer and played their home games at Jayne Stadium. They were members of the Pioneer Football League. They finished the season 4–7, 3–5 in PFL play to finish in a two-way tie for seventh place.

== Schedule ==
Date	Time	Opponent	Site	TV	Result	Attendance
September 3	6:00 pm	at No. 12 James Madison*	Bridgeforth Stadium; Harrisonburg, VA	MadiZone	L 7–80	23,626
September 10	6:00 pm	VMI*	Jayne Stadium; Morehead, KY	OVCDN	L 13–17	5,588
September 17	6:00 pm	Lincoln*	Jayne Stadium; Morehead, KY	OVCDN	W 56–6	7,275
September 24	2:00 pm	at Drake	Drake Stadium; Des Moines, IA	BV	L 28–30	3,158
October 1	1:00 pm	Valparaiso	Jayne Stadium; Morehead, KY	OVCDN	W 29–26	3,453
October 8	1:00 pm	at Dayton	Welcome Stadium; Dayton, OH	TWCS	L 27–51	2,440
October 15	1:00 pm	Marist^{†}	Jayne Stadium; Morehead, KY	OVCDN	L 41–44 ^{OT}	8,789
October 22	1:00 pm	Jacksonville	Jayne Stadium; Morehead, KY	OVCDN	L 49–61	3,055
November 5	1:00 pm	at Butler	Butler Bowl; Indianapolis, IN	BAA	W 54–28	4,896
November 12	1:00 pm	Campbell	Jayne Stadium; Morehead, KY	OVCDN	L 21–27	6,255
November 19	1:00 pm	at Davidson	Richardson Stadium; Davidson, NC	DAA	W 31–10	3,017
*Non-conference game; ^{†}Homecoming; Rankings from STATS Poll released prior to the game; All times are in Eastern time

== Game summaries ==
=== At James Madison ===
	1	2	3	4	Total
Eagles	0	7	0	0	7
#12 Dukes	28	24	21	7	80

=== VMI ===
	1	2	3	4	Total
Keydets	0	14	3	0	17
Eagles	0	7	0	6	13

=== Lincoln ===
	1	2	3	4	Total
Lions	0	6	0	0	6
Eagles	14	21	7	14	56

=== At Drake ===
	1	2	3	4	Total
Eagles	8	0	0	20	28
Bulldogs	6	10	14	0	30

=== Valparaiso ===
	1	2	3	4	Total
Crusaders	7	10	3	6	26
Eagles	14	0	7	8	29

=== At Dayton ===
	1	2	3	4	Total
Eagles	0	7	13	7	27
Flyers	0	24	6	21	51

=== Marist ===
	1	2	3	4	OT	Total
Red Foxes	14	3	14	7	6	44
Eagles	14	0	14	10	3	41

=== Jacksonville ===
	1	2	3	4	Total
Dolphins	14	17	21	9	61
Eagles	14	21	7	7	49

=== At Butler ===
	1	2	3	4	Total
Eagles	10	24	10	10	54
Bulldogs	0	7	7	14	28

=== Campbell ===
	1	2	3	4	Total
Fighting Camels	7	0	13	7	27
Eagles	0	7	0	14	21

=== At Davidson ===
	1	2	3	4	Total
Eagles	7	14	10	0	31
Wildcats	0	3	7	0	10
