= 2016 Wagner Seahawks football team =

American college football season

2016 Wagner Seahawks football
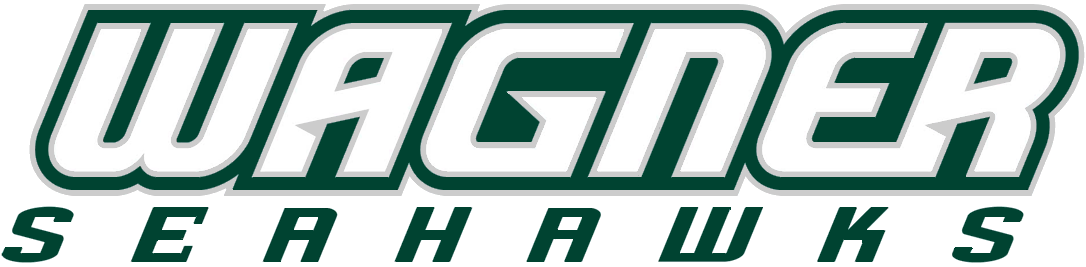
- Conference: Northeast Conference
- Record: 6–5 (4–2 NEC)
- Head coach: Jason Houghtaling (2nd season)
- Offensive coordinator: Rich Scangarello (1st season)
- Defensive coordinator: Ryan Fullen
- Home stadium: Wagner College Stadium

2016 Northeast Conference football standings
	Conf.			Overall
Team	W		L	W		L
Duquesne +	5	–	1	8	–	3
Saint Francis (PA) +^	5	–	1	7	–	5
Wagner	4	–	2	6	–	5
Bryant	4	–	2	5	–	6
Sacred Heart	1	–	5	6	–	5
Central Connecticut	1	–	5	2	–	9
Robert Morris	1	–	5	2	–	9
+ – Conference co-champions; ^ – FCS playoff participant

The 2016 Wagner Seahawks football team represented Wagner College in the 2016 NCAA Division I FCS football season as a member of the Northeast Conference (NEC). They were led by second-year head coach Jason Houghtaling and played their home games at Wagner College Stadium. They were Wagner finished the season 6–5 overall and 4–2 in NEC play to tie for third place.

== Schedule ==
Date	Time	Opponent	Site	TV	Result	Attendance
September 1	6:00 p.m.	Saint Anselm*	Wagner College Stadium; Staten Island, NY	NECFR	W 38–16	2,414
September 10	Noon	Concordia (MI)*	Wagner College Stadium; Staten Island, NY	NECFR	W 38–0	2,013
September 24	1:00 p.m.	at Boston College*	Alumni Stadium; Chestnut Hill, MA	ACCN+	L 10–42	22,728
October 1	6:00 p.m.	Sacred Heart^{†}	Wagner College Stadium; Staten Island, NY	ESPN3	W 45–20	3,002
October 8	6:00 p.m.	Columbia*	Wagner College Stadium; Staten Island, NY	NECFR	L 13–15	1,973
October 15	1:00 p.m.	at Central Connecticut	Arute Field; New Britain, CT	ESPN3	W 25–21	3,826
October 22	1:00 p.m.	at Bryant	Beirne Stadium; Smithfield, RI	NECFR	L 17–27	3,867
October 29	Noon	at Massachusetts*	Warren McGuirk Alumni Stadium; Hadley, MA	ASN	L 10–34	8,468
November 5	Noon	Duquesne	Wagner College Stadium; Staten Island, NY	NECFR	L 20–28	2,320
November 12	Noon	at Robert Morris	Joe Walton Stadium; Moon Township, PA	NECFR	W 40–5	1,503
November 19	Noon	No. 25 Saint Francis (PA)	Wagner College Stadium; Staten Island, NY	NECFR	W 31–24	2,792
*Non-conference game; ^{†}Homecoming; Rankings from STATS Poll released prior to the game; All times are in Eastern time

== Game summaries ==
=== Saint Anselm ===
	1	2	3	4	Total
Hawks	7	3	0	6	16
Seahawks	3	7	7	21	38

=== Concordia (MI) ===
	1	2	3	4	Total
Cardinals	0	0	0	0	0
Seahawks	7	21	3	7	38

=== At Boston College ===
	1	2	3	4	Total
Seahawks	7	3	0	0	10
Eagles	14	14	14	0	42

=== Sacred Heart ===
	1	2	3	4	Total
Pioneers	6	14	0	0	20
Seahawks	12	27	0	6	45

=== Columbia ===
	1	2	3	4	Total
Lions	3	3	6	3	15
Seahawks	3	10	0	0	13

=== At Central Connecticut ===
	1	2	3	4	Total
Seahawks	7	3	0	15	25
Blue Devils	0	21	0	0	21

=== At Bryant ===
	1	2	3	4	Total
Seahawks	0	7	3	7	17
Bulldogs	3	7	10	7	27

=== At Massachusetts ===
	1	2	3	4	Total
Seahawks	0	0	3	7	10
Minutemen	14	13	7	0	34

=== Duquesne ===
	1	2	3	4	Total
Dukes	7	7	7	7	28
Seahawks	10	7	3	0	20

=== At Robert Morris ===
	1	2	3	4	Total
Seahawks	10	17	13	0	40
Colonials	3	0	2	0	5

=== Saint Francis (PA) ===
	1	2	3	4	Total
#25 Red Flash	0	0	7	17	24
Seahawks	7	17	7	0	31
