= 2016 Jacksonville Dolphins football team =

American college football season

2016 Jacksonville Dolphins football
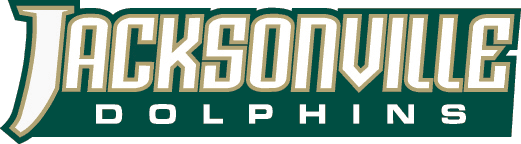
- Conference: Pioneer Football League
- Record: 5–5 (4–3 PFL)
- Head coach: Ian Shields (1st season)
- Offensive coordinator: Ian Shields (1st season)
- Defensive coordinator: Rich Ellerson (1st season)
- Home stadium: D. B. Milne Field

2016 Pioneer Football League standings
	Conf.			Overall
Team	W		L	W		L
No. 19 San Diego $^	8	–	0	10	–	2
Dayton	7	–	1	9	–	2
Drake	6	–	2	7	–	4
Marist	5	–	3	5	–	6
Jacksonville	4	–	3	5	–	5
Campbell	3	–	4	5	–	5
Morehead State	3	–	5	4	–	7
Valparaiso	3	–	5	4	–	7
Butler	2	–	6	4	–	7
Stetson	2	–	6	4	–	7
Davidson	0	–	8	2	–	9
$ – Conference champion; ^ – FCS playoff participant; Rankings from STATS Poll

The 2016 Jacksonville Dolphins football team represented Jacksonville University in the 2016 NCAA Division I FCS football season. They were led by first-year head coach Ian Shields and played their home games at D. B. Milne Field. They were members of the Pioneer Football League (PFL). They finished the season 5–5, 4–3 in PFL play to finish in fifth place.

== Schedule ==
Date	Time	Opponent	Site	TV	Result	Attendance
September 10	7:00 pm	at Liberty*	Williams Stadium; Lynchburg, VA	ESPN3	L 7–55	16,625
September 17	7:00 pm	Edward Waters*	D. B. Milne Field; Jacksonville, FL (Jacksonville Classic)	ESPN3	W 41–7	3,158
September 24	7:00 pm	at Stetson	Spec Martin Stadium; DeLand, FL	ESPN3	W 24–7	4,050
October 1	1:00 pm	Duquesne*	D. B. Milne Field; Jacksonville, FL	ESPN3	L 35–54	1,661
October 8		Campbell	D. B. Milne Field; Jacksonville, FL		Cancelled	
October 15	12:00 pm	Dayton	D. B. Milne Field; Jacksonville, FL	ESPN3	L 16–36	1,518
October 22	1:00 pm	Morehead State	Jayne Stadium; Morehead, KY		W 61–49	3,055
October 29	1:00 pm	Davidson	Richardson Stadium; Davidson, NC		W 35–17	3,209
November 5	1:00 pm	Drake	D. B. Milne Field; Jacksonville, FL	ESPN3	L 27–31	471
November 12	2:00 pm	Valparaiso	Brown Field; Valparaiso, IN		L 39–42	1,380
November 19	12:00 pm	Marist	D. B. Milne Field; Jacksonville, FL	ESPN3	W 41–35	1,738
*Non-conference game

The game between Jacksonville and Campbell was cancelled in advance of the arrival of Hurricane Matthew.

- Source: Schedule

== Game summaries ==
=== At Liberty ===
	1	2	3	4	Total
Dolphins	0	0	0	7	7
Flames	14	17	10	14	55

=== Edward Waters ===
	1	2	3	4	Total
Tigers	7	0	0	0	7
Dolphins	7	6	28	0	41

=== At Stetson ===
	1	2	3	4	Total
Dolphins	7	17	0	0	24
Hatters	0	0	7	0	7

=== Duquesne ===
	1	2	3	4	Total
Dukes	10	10	21	13	54
Dolphins	7	7	14	7	35

=== Campbell ===
- This game was canceled due to Hurricane Matthew.

=== Dayton ===
	1	2	3	4	Total
Flyers	0	27	3	6	36
Dolphins	3	0	13	0	16

=== At Morehead State ===
	1	2	3	4	Total
Dolphins	14	17	21	9	61
Eagles	14	21	7	7	49

=== At Davidson ===
	1	2	3	4	Total
Dolphins	7	7	21	0	35
Wildcats	0	10	7	0	17

=== Drake ===
	1	2	3	4	Total
Bulldogs	0	7	10	14	31
Dolphins	10	3	0	14	27

=== At Valparaiso ===
	1	2	3	4	Total
Dolphins	3	14	7	15	39
Crusaders	28	7	7	0	42

=== Marist ===
	1	2	3	4	Total
Red Foxes	7	7	14	7	35
Dolphins	3	21	17	0	41
