= 2016 Liberty Flames football team =

American college football season

2016 Liberty Flames football

Big South co-champion
- Conference: Big South Conference
- Record: 6–5 (4–1 Big South)
- Head coach: Turner Gill (5th season)
- Offensive coordinator: Joe Dailey (1st season)
- Offensive scheme: Spread
- Co-defensive coordinators: Robert Wimberly (5th season); Vantz Singletary (5th season)
- Base defense: 4–3
- Home stadium: Williams Stadium

2016 Big South Conference football standings
	Conf.			Overall
Team	W		L	W		L
No. 15 Charleston Southern +^	4	–	1	7	–	4
Liberty +	4	–	1	6	–	5
Kennesaw State	3	–	2	8	–	3
Gardner–Webb	3	–	2	5	–	6
Presbyterian	1	–	4	2	–	9
Monmouth	0	–	5	4	–	7
+ – Conference co-champions; ^ – FCS playoff participant; Rankings from STATS Poll

The 2016 Liberty Flames football team represented Liberty University in the 2016 NCAA Division I FCS football season. They were led by fifth-year head coach Turner Gill and played their home games at Williams Stadium. They were a member of the Big South Conference. They finished the season 6–5, 4–1 in Big South play to share the conference championship with Charleston Southern. Despite the conference title, the Flames were not invited to the FCS playoffs.

== Schedule ==
Date	Time	Opponent	Rank	Site	TV	Result	Attendance
September 3	12:30 pm	at Virginia Tech*		Lane Stadium; Blacksburg, VA	ACCN	L 13–36	62,234
September 10	7:00 pm	Jacksonville*		Williams Stadium; Lynchburg, VA	ESPN3	W 55–7	16,625
September 17	7:00 pm	at SMU*		Gerald J. Ford Stadium; Dallas, TX	ESPN3	L 14–29	22,127
September 24	7:00 pm	No. 3 Jacksonville State*		Williams Stadium; Lynchburg, VA	ESPN3	L 19–48	15,354
October 1	7:00 pm	Robert Morris*		Williams Stadium; Lynchburg, VA	ESPN3	W 41–7	11,273
October 15	7:00 pm	at Kennesaw State		Fifth Third Bank Stadium; Kennesaw, GA	ESPN3	W 36–21	8,803
October 22	3:30 pm	Monmouth^{†}		Williams Stadium; Lynchburg, VA	ESPN3	W 52–28	16,687
October 29	3:30 pm	Gardner–Webb		Williams Stadium; Lynchburg, VA	BSN	W 23–20 ^{OT}	16,608
November 5	2:00 pm	at Presbyterian		Bailey Memorial Stadium; Clinton, SC	ESPN3	W 16–0	3,101
November 12	3:30 pm	No. 14 Charleston Southern	No. 25	Williams Stadium; Lynchburg, VA	ESPN3	L 26–48	21,712
November 17	7:00 pm	at No. 16 Coastal Carolina*		Brooks Stadium; Conway, SC (rivalry)	ESPNews	L 7–42	7,787
*Non-conference game; ^{†}Homecoming; Rankings from STATS Poll released prior to the game; All times are in Eastern time

- Source: Schedule

== Game summaries ==
=== Virginia Tech ===
Liberty @ Virginia Tech

Team	1	2	3	4	Total
Flames	6	7	0	0	13
• Hokies	7	17	9	3	36

- Date: September 3
- Location: Lane Stadium
  Blacksburg, VA
- Game attendance: 62,234

=== Jacksonville ===
Jacksonville @ Liberty

Team	1	2	3	4	Total
Dolphins	0	0	0	7	7
• Flames	14	17	10	14	55

- Date: September 10
- Location: Williams Stadium
  Lynchburg, VA
- Game attendance: 16,625

=== SMU ===
Liberty @ SMU

Team	1	2	3	4	Total
Flames	7	0	7	0	14
• Mustangs	10	3	6	10	29

- Date: September 17
- Location: Gerald J. Ford Stadium
  Dallas, TX
- Game attendance: 22,127

=== Jacksonville State ===
Jacksonville State @ Liberty

Team	1	2	3	4	Total
• #3 Gamecocks	14	13	0	21	48
Flames	3	0	7	9	19

- Date: September 24
- Location: Williams Stadium
  Lynchburg, VA
- Game attendance: 15,354

=== Robert Morris ===
Robert Morris @ Liberty

Team	1	2	3	4	Total
Colonials	7	0	0	0	7
• Flames	7	14	10	10	41

- Date: October 1
- Location: Williams Stadium
  Lynchburg, VA
- Game attendance: 11,273

=== Kennesaw State ===
Liberty @ Kennesaw State

Team	1	2	3	4	Total
• Flames	7	13	6	10	36
Owls	7	7	0	7	21

- Date: October 15
- Location: Fifth Third Bank Stadium
  Kennesaw, GA
- Game attendance: 8,803

=== Monmouth ===
Monmouth @ Liberty

Team	1	2	3	4	Total
Hawks	0	7	14	7	28
• Flames	14	17	7	14	52

- Date: October 22
- Location: Williams Stadium
  Lynchburg, VA
- Game attendance: 16,687

=== Gardner–Webb ===
Gardner–Webb @ Liberty

Team	1	2	3	4	OT	Total
Runnin' Bulldogs	0	6	7	7	0	20
• Flames	7	0	3	10	3	23

- Date: October 29
- Location: Williams Stadium
  Lynchburg, VA
- Game attendance: 16,608

=== Presbyterian ===
Liberty @ Presbyterian

Team	1	2	3	4	Total
• Flames	6	3	0	7	16
Blue Hose	0	0	0	0	0

- Date: November 5
- Location: Bailey Memorial Stadium
  Clinton, SC
- Game attendance: 3,101

=== Charleston Southern ===
Charleston Southern @ Liberty

Team	1	2	3	4	Total
• #14 Buccaneers	7	24	7	10	48
#25 Flames	6	0	6	14	26

- Date: November 12
- Location: Williams Stadium
  Lynchburg, VA
- Game attendance: 21,712

=== Coastal Carolina ===
Liberty @ Coastal Carolina

Team	1	2	3	4	Total
Flames	0	7	0	0	7
• #16 Chanticleers	7	21	7	7	42

- Date: November 17
- Location: Brooks Stadium
  Conway, SC
- Game attendance: 7,787

== Ranking movements ==
Ranking movements Legend: ██ Increase in ranking ██ Decrease in ranking — = Not ranked RV = Received votes
	Week													
Poll	Pre	1	2	3	4	5	6	7	8	9	10	11	12	Final
STATS FCS	RV	RV	RV	RV	—	—	—	—	RV	RV	25	RV	RV	—
Coaches	RV	RV	RV	RV	—	RV	RV	RV	RV	RV	24	RV	—	—
