= 2016 Campbell Fighting Camels football team =

American college football season

2016 Campbell Fighting Camels football
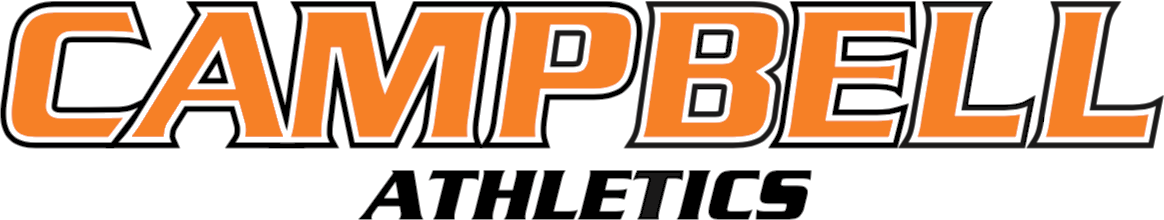
- Conference: Pioneer Football League
- Record: 5–5 (3–4 PFL)
- Head coach: Mike Minter (4th season)
- Offensive coordinator: Landon Mariani (4th season)
- Defensive coordinator: Craig Cox (4th season)
- Home stadium: Barker–Lane Stadium

2016 Pioneer Football League standings
	Conf.			Overall
Team	W		L	W		L
No. 19 San Diego $^	8	–	0	10	–	2
Dayton	7	–	1	9	–	2
Drake	6	–	2	7	–	4
Marist	5	–	3	5	–	6
Jacksonville	4	–	3	5	–	5
Campbell	3	–	4	5	–	5
Morehead State	3	–	5	4	–	7
Valparaiso	3	–	5	4	–	7
Butler	2	–	6	4	–	7
Stetson	2	–	6	4	–	7
Davidson	0	–	8	2	–	9
$ – Conference champion; ^ – FCS playoff participant; Rankings from STATS Poll

The 2016 Campbell Fighting Camels football team represented Campbell University in the 2016 NCAA Division I FCS football season. They were led by fourth-year head coach Mike Minter and played their home games at Barker–Lane Stadium. They were members of the Pioneer Football League. They finished the season 5–5, 3–4 in PFL play to finish in sixth place.

== Schedule ==
Date	Time	Opponent	Site	TV	Result	Attendance
September 3	4:00 p.m.	Bluefield*	Barker–Lane Stadium; Buies Creek, NC	BSN	W 59–7	5,230
September 10	6:00 p.m.	at Chowan*	Garrison Stadium; Murfreesboro, NC		W 47–14	3,480
September 17	6:00 p.m.	Presbyterian*	Barker–Lane Stadium; Buies Creek, NC	BSN	L 14–31	5,860
September 24	6:00 p.m.	Butler	Barker–Lane Stadium; Buies Creek, NC	BSN	W 33–27 ^{OT}	6,610
October 1	1:00 p.m.	at Marist	Tenney Stadium at Leonidoff Field; Poughkeepsie, NY	RFN	L 7–24	3,171
October 8		at Jacksonville	D. B. Milne Field; Jacksonville, FL		Cancelled	
October 22	4:00 p.m.	Stetson^{†}	Barker–Lane Stadium; Buies Creek, NC	BSN	L 24–30 ^{OT}	6,673
October 29	2:00 p.m.	at Drake	Drake Stadium; Des Moines, IA	BV	L 21–33	1,727
November 5	4:00 p.m.	Davidson	Barker–Lane Stadium; Buies Creek, NC	BSN	W 28–0	4,644
November 12	1:00 p.m.	at Morehead State	Jayne Stadium; Morehead, KY	OVCDN	W 27–21	6,255
November 19	12:00 p.m.	San Diego	Barker–Lane Stadium; Buies Creek, NC	BSN	L 21–57	4,121
*Non-conference game; ^{†}Homecoming; All times are in Eastern time

The game between Campbell and Jacksonville was postponed in advance of the arrival of Hurricane Matthew. The game was subsequently cancelled.

- Source: Schedule

== Game summaries ==
=== Bluefield ===
	1	2	3	4	Total
Rams	0	0	0	7	7
Fighting Camels	14	28	10	7	59

=== At Chowan ===
	1	2	3	4	Total
Fighting Camels	24	7	13	3	47
Hawks	7	0	7	0	14

=== Presbyterian ===
	1	2	3	4	Total
Blue Hose	10	14	0	7	31
Fighting Camels	0	6	0	8	14

=== Butler ===
	1	2	3	4	OT	Total
Bulldogs	0	10	7	10	0	27
Fighting Camels	0	20	0	7	6	33

=== At Marist ===
	1	2	3	4	Total
Fighting Camels	0	7	0	0	7
Red Foxes	0	3	14	7	24

=== At Jacksonville ===
- Game was canceled due to Hurricane Matthew.

=== Stetson ===
	1	2	3	4	OT	Total
Hatters	7	0	14	3	6	30
Fighting Camels	10	0	0	14	0	24

=== At Drake ===
	1	2	3	4	Total
Fighting Camels	0	7	7	7	21
Bulldogs	16	3	6	7	32

=== Davidson ===
	1	2	3	4	Total
Wildcats	0	0	0	0	0
Fighting Camels	7	0	14	7	28

=== At Morehead State ===
	1	2	3	4	Total
Fighting Camels	7	0	13	7	27
Eagles	0	7	0	14	21

=== San Diego ===
	1	2	3	4	Total
Toreros	7	16	20	14	57
Fighting Camels	7	7	7	0	21
