= 2016 Davidson Wildcats football team =

American college football season

2016 Davidson Wildcats football
- Conference: Pioneer Football League
- Record: 2–9 (0–8 PFL)
- Head coach: Paul Nichols (4th season)
- Offensive coordinator: Vinny Marino (1st season)
- Defensive coordinator: Chad Creamer
- Home stadium: Richardson Stadium

2016 Pioneer Football League standings
	Conf.			Overall
Team	W		L	W		L
No. 19 San Diego $^	8	–	0	10	–	2
Dayton	7	–	1	9	–	2
Drake	6	–	2	7	–	4
Marist	5	–	3	5	–	6
Jacksonville	4	–	3	5	–	5
Campbell	3	–	4	5	–	5
Morehead State	3	–	5	4	–	7
Valparaiso	3	–	5	4	–	7
Butler	2	–	6	4	–	7
Stetson	2	–	6	4	–	7
Davidson	0	–	8	2	–	9
$ – Conference champion; ^ – FCS playoff participant; Rankings from STATS Poll

The 2016 Davidson Wildcats football team represented Davidson College in the 2016 NCAA Division I FCS football season. They were led by fourth-year head coach Paul Nichols and played their home games at Richardson Stadium. They were members of the Pioneer Football League. They finished the season 2–9, 0–8 in PFL play to finish in last place.

== Schedule ==
Date	Time	Opponent	Site	TV	Result	Attendance
September 3	1:00 pm	at Georgetown*	Cooper Field; Washington, D.C.	CI	L 14–38	1,863
September 10	2:00 pm	at Kentucky Wesleyan*	Steele Stadium; Owensboro, KY		W 35–21	350
September 17	7:00 pm	Livingstone*	Richardson Stadium; Davidson, NC	DAA	W 38–12	4,219
September 24	1:00 pm	at Valparaiso	Brown Field; Valparaiso, IN	ESPN3	L 20–24	2,897
October 1	1:00 pm	Stetson^{†}	Richardson Stadium; Davidson, NC	DAA	L 27–31	4,281
October 8	4:00 pm	at San Diego	Torero Stadium; San Diego, CA	W.TV	L 3–52	2,827
October 15	12:00 pm	Butler	Richardson Stadium; Davidson, NC	DAA	L 17–20	2,917
October 22	12:00 pm	at Marist	Tenney Stadium at Leonidoff Field; Poughkeepsie, NY	RFN	L 10–31	1,236
October 29	1:00 pm	Jacksonville	Richardson Stadium; Davidson, NC	DAA	L 17–35	3,209
November 5	4:00 pm	at Campbell	Barker–Lane Stadium; Buies Creek, NC	BSN	L 0–28	4,644
November 19	1:00 pm	Morehead State	Richardson Stadium; Davidson, NC	DAA	L 10–31	3,017
*Non-conference game; ^{†}Homecoming; All times are in Eastern time

- Source: Schedule

== Game summaries ==
=== At Georgetown ===
	1	2	3	4	Total
Wildcats	0	7	0	7	14
Hoyas	0	17	21	0	38

=== Kentucky Wesleyan ===
	1	2	3	4	Total
Wildcats	7	21	0	7	35
Panthers	0	7	7	7	21

=== Livingstone ===
	1	2	3	4	Total
Blue Bears	0	6	0	6	12
Wildcats	21	17	0	0	38

=== At Valparaiso ===
	1	2	3	4	Total
Wildcats	6	7	0	7	20
Crusaders	7	10	7	0	24

=== Stetson ===
	1	2	3	4	Total
Hatters	7	3	0	21	31
Wildcats	0	7	14	6	27

=== At San Diego ===
	1	2	3	4	Total
Wildcats	0	0	0	3	3
Toreros	28	14	10	0	52

=== Butler ===
	1	2	3	4	Total
Bulldogs	0	7	7	6	20
Wildcats	7	7	3	0	17

=== At Marist ===
	1	2	3	4	Total
Wildcats	0	3	0	7	10
Red Foxes	14	7	7	3	31

=== Jacksonville ===
	1	2	3	4	Total
Dolphins	7	7	21	0	35
Wildcats	0	10	7	0	17

=== At Campbell ===
	1	2	3	4	Total
Wildcats	0	0	0	0	0
Fighting Camels	7	0	14	7	28

=== Morehead State ===
	1	2	3	4	Total
Eagles	7	10	14	0	31
Wildcats	0	3	7	0	10
