= 2016 Charleston Southern Buccaneers football team =

American college football season

2016 Charleston Southern Buccaneers football
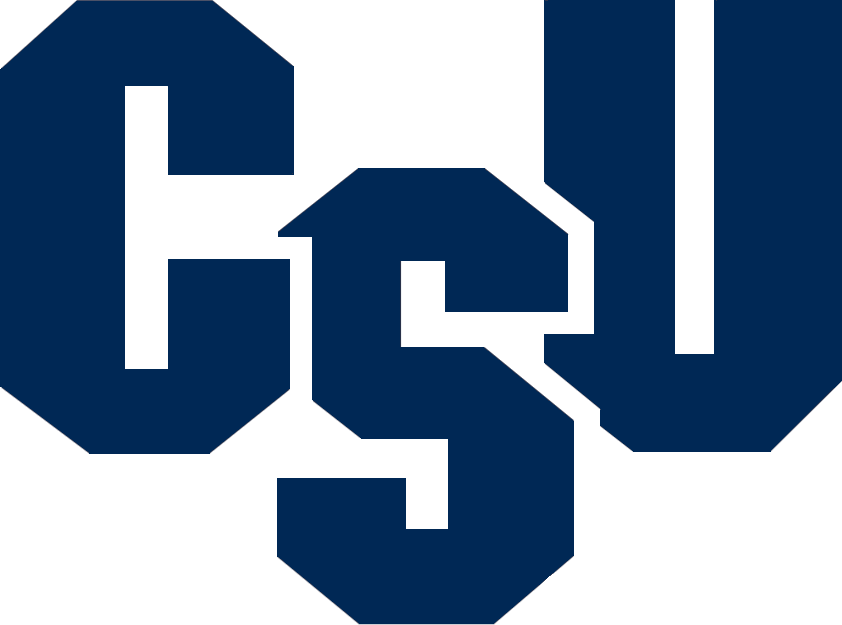

Big South co-champion

NCAA Division I First Round, L 14–15 vs. Wofford
- Conference: Big South Conference

Ranking
- STATS: No. 15
- FCS Coaches: No. 14
- Record: 7–4 (4–1 Big South)
- Head coach: Jamey Chadwell (3rd season)
- Offensive coordinator: Gabe Giardina (4th season)
- Defensive coordinator: Chad Staggs (4th season)
- Home stadium: Buccaneer Field

2016 Big South Conference football standings
	Conf.			Overall
Team	W		L	W		L
No. 15 Charleston Southern +^	4	–	1	7	–	4
Liberty +	4	–	1	6	–	5
Kennesaw State	3	–	2	8	–	3
Gardner–Webb	3	–	2	5	–	6
Presbyterian	1	–	4	2	–	9
Monmouth	0	–	5	4	–	7
+ – Conference co-champions; ^ – FCS playoff participant; Rankings from STATS Poll

The 2015 Charleston Southern Buccaneers football team represented Charleston Southern University as a member of the Big South Conference during the 2015 NCAA Division I FCS football season. Led by Jamey Chadwell in his fourth and final season as head coach, the Buccaneers compiled an overall record of 7–4 with a mark of 4–1 in conference play, sharing the Big South title with Liberty. Charleston Southern earned the conference's automatic bid to the NCAA Division I Football Championship playoffs, where the Buccaneers lost in the first round to Wofford. Charleston Southern played home games at Buccaneer Field in Charleston, South Carolina.

== Schedule ==
Date	Time	Opponent	Rank	Site	TV	Result	Attendance
August 27	7:30 pm	at No. 1 North Dakota State*	No. 7	Fargodome; Fargo, ND (FCS Kickoff)	ESPN	L 17–24 ^{OT}	18,881
September 3	11:45 am	Kentucky State*	No. 7	Buccaneer Field; Charleston, SC	ESPN3	W 57–7	1,780
September 10	12:30 pm	at No. 3 (FBS) Florida State*	No. 7	Doak Campbell Stadium; Tallahassee, FL	ACCRSN	L 8–52	75,831
September 24	1:00 pm	at Monmouth	No. 12	Kessler Field; West Long Branch, NJ	ESPN3	W 35–7	2,801
October 1	6:00 pm	at No. 14 Coastal Carolina*	No. 10	Brooks Stadium; Conway, SC	ESPN3	W 59–58 ^{2OT}	10,213
October 8	11:45 am	Albany State	No. 8	Buccaneer Field; Charleston, SC	ESPN3	canceled^{[a]}	
October 22	3:00 pm	Presbyterian^{†}	No. 9	Buccaneer Field; Charleston, SC	ESPN3	W 38–3	5,375
October 29	11:45 am	Bucknell*	No. 9	Buccaneer Field; Charleston, SC	ESPN3	W 49–28	2,356
November 5	11:45 am	Gardner–Webb	No. 8	Buccaneer Field; Charleston, SC	ASN	L 10–17	1,603
November 12	3:30 pm	at No. 25 Liberty	No. 14	Williams Stadium; Lynchburg, VA	ESPN3	W 48–26	21,712
November 19	11:45 am	Kennesaw State	No. 14	Buccaneer Field; Charleston, SC	ESPN3	W 28–7	2,446
November 26	1:00 pm	at No. 19 Wofford*	No. 10	Gibbs Stadium; Spartanburg, SC (NCAA Division I First Round)	ESPN3	L 14–15	2,605
*Non-conference game; ^{†}Homecoming; Rankings from STATS Poll released prior to the game; All times are in Eastern time

^{^[a]}The game between Charleston Southern and Albany State was postponed in advance of the arrival of Hurricane Matthew. A future date for the game has not yet been announced.

== Game summaries ==
=== At North Dakota State ===
	1	2	3	4	OT	Total
#7 Buccaneers	0	3	7	7	0	17
#1 Bison	0	3	7	7	7	24

=== Kentucky State ===
	1	2	3	4	Total
Thorobreds	0	7	0	0	7
#7 Buccaneers	22	21	7	7	57

=== At Florida State ===
	1	2	3	4	Total
#7 Buccaneers	0	6	0	2	8
#3 (FBS) Seminoles	28	7	14	3	52

=== At Monmouth ===
	1	2	3	4	Total
#12 Buccaneers	0	7	14	14	35
Hawks	0	0	7	0	7

=== At Coastal Carolina ===
	1	2	3	4	OT	2OT	Total
#10 Buccaneers	7	16	7	15	7	7	59
#14 Chanticleers	21	0	10	14	7	6	58

=== Albany State ===
- The game between Charleston Southern and Albany State was postponed in advance of the arrival of Hurricane Matthew.

=== Presbyterian ===
	1	2	3	4	Total
Blue Hose	0	3	0	0	3
#9 Buccaneers	0	21	14	3	38

=== Bucknell ===
	1	2	3	4	Total
Bison	7	7	7	7	28
#9 Buccaneers	7	14	21	7	49

=== Gardner–Webb ===
	1	2	3	4	Total
Runnin' Bulldogs	0	0	7	10	17
#8 Buccaneers	7	0	0	3	10

=== Liberty ===
	1	2	3	4	Total
#25 Flames	6	0	6	14	26
#14 Buccaneers	7	24	7	10	48

=== Kennesaw State ===
	1	2	3	4	Total
Owls	0	7	0	0	7
#14 Buccaneers	14	7	0	7	28

=== Wofford—NCAA Division I First Round ===
	1	2	3	4	Total
#10 Buccaneers	7	0	7	0	14
#19 Terriers	0	8	7	0	15

== Ranking movements ==
Ranking movements Legend: ██ Increase in ranking ██ Decrease in ranking — = Not ranked
	Week													
Poll	Pre	1	2	3	4	5	6	7	8	9	10	11	12	Final
STATS FCS	7	7	12	12	10	8	9	9	9	8	14	14	10	15
Coaches	6	7	12	11	8	8	8	9	9	9	14	13	10	14
FCS Playoffs	Not released									9	—	—	Not released	
