= 2016 James Madison Dukes football team =

American college football season

2016 James Madison Dukes football

NCAA Division I champion CAA champion Lambert Cup winner

NCAA Division I Championship Game, W 28–14 vs. Youngstown State
- Conference: Colonial Athletic Association

Ranking
- STATS: No. 1
- FCS Coaches: No. 1
- Record: 14–1 (8–0 CAA)
- Head coach: Mike Houston (1st season)
- Offensive coordinator: Donnie Kirkpatrick (1st season)
- Offensive scheme: Spread
- Defensive coordinator: Bob Trott (1st season)
- Base defense: 4–2–5
- Home stadium: Bridgeforth Stadium

2016 Colonial Athletic Association football standings
	Conf.			Overall
Team	W		L	W		L
No. 1 James Madison $^	8	–	0	14	–	1
No. 11 Villanova ^	6	–	2	9	–	4
No. 17 New Hampshire ^	6	–	2	8	–	5
No. 8 Richmond ^	5	–	3	10	–	4
Maine	5	–	3	6	–	5
Albany	4	–	4	7	–	4
Stony Brook	4	–	4	5	–	6
William & Mary	3	–	5	5	–	6
Towson	3	–	5	4	–	7
Delaware	2	–	6	4	–	7
Elon	1	–	7	2	–	9
Rhode Island	1	–	7	2	–	9
$ – Conference champion; ^ – FCS playoff participant; Rankings from STATS Poll

The 2016 James Madison Dukes football team represented James Madison University during the 2016 NCAA Division I FCS football season. They were led by first year head coach Mike Houston and played their home games at Bridgeforth Stadium and Zane Showker Field. They were a member of the Colonial Athletic Association (CAA). They finished the season 14–1 overall with an 8–0 mark in CAA play to win the conference title. They received the automatic bid to the FCS playoffs, where they defeated New Hampshire, Sam Houston State, and five-time defending champions North Dakota State to advance to the National Championship Game, where they defeated Youngstown State. This was their first national championship since 2004.

== Schedule ==
Date	Time	Opponent	Rank	Site	TV	Result	Attendance
September 3	6:00 pm	Morehead State*	No. 12	Bridgeforth Stadium; Harrisonburg, VA	MadiZone	W 80–7	23,626
September 10	4:00 pm	Central Connecticut*	No. 12	Bridgeforth Stadium; Harrisonburg, VA	MadiZone	W 56–21	20,636
September 17	3:30 pm	at North Carolina*	No. 11	Kenan Memorial Stadium; Chapel Hill, NC	ACCN/CSN	L 28–56	56,000
September 24	12:00 pm	at Maine	No. 11	Alfond Stadium; Orono, ME	ASN	W 31–20	8,786
October 1	1:30 pm	Delaware	No. 7	Bridgeforth Stadium; Harrisonburg, VA	MadiZone	W 43–20	25,236
October 8	3:30 pm	William & Mary	No. 7	Bridgeforth Stadium; Harrisonburg, VA	CSN	W 31–24	20,354
October 15	12:00 pm	at New Hampshire	No. 7	Wildcat Stadium; Durham, NH	ASN	W 42–39	8,316
October 29	3:30 pm	Rhode Island^{†}	No. 8	Bridgeforth Stadium; Harrisonburg, VA	MadiZone	W 84–7	23,841
November 5	3:30 pm	at No. 6 Richmond	No. 7	Robins Stadium; Richmond, VA (rivalry)	CSN	W 47–43	8,700
November 12	1:00 pm	at No. 9 Villanova	No. 6	Villanova Stadium; Villanova, PA	NNAA	W 20–7	6,109
November 19	1:30 pm	Elon	No. 6	Bridgeforth Stadium; Harrisonburg, VA	MadiZone	W 63–14	16,184
December 3	2:00 pm	No. 22 New Hampshire*	No. 5	Bridgeforth Stadium; Harrisonburg, VA (FCS Playoffs Second Round)	ESPN3	W 55–22	13,231
December 9	7:00 pm	No. 1 Sam Houston State*	No. 5	Bridgeforth Stadium; Harrisonburg, VA (FCS Playoffs Quarterfinals)	ESPN2	W 65–7	15,646
December 16	7:00 pm	at No. 4 North Dakota State*	No. 5	Fargodome; Fargo, ND (FCS Playoffs Semifinals)	ESPN2	W 27–17	18,282
January 7, 2017	12:00 pm	vs. No. 13 Youngstown State*	No. 5	Toyota Stadium; Frisco, TX (FCS National Championship Game)	ESPN2	W 28–14	14,423
*Non-conference game; ^{†}Homecoming; Rankings from STATS FCS Poll released prior to game Poll released prior to the game; All times are in Eastern time

== Roster ==
2016 James Madison Dukes football team roster
Players
Coaches
Offense

Pos.	#	Name	Class
RB	32	Khalid Abdullah	Sr
WR	7	Terrence Alls	Jr
OL	67	Zaire Bethea	Fr
OL	61	A.J. Bolden	Jr
WR	12	Logan Boyd	Jr
WR	5	Jake Brown	Fr
OL	58	Gerren Butler	Fr
OL	68	Tyree Chavious	Fr
WR	42	Skyler Clark	Fr
WR	40	Daniel Clements	So
TE	86	Mark Cullen	Fr
WR	6	Rashard Davis	Sr
OL	55	Nick Edwards	Jr
QB	18	Hunter Etheridge	So
OL	75	Michael Faulkner	Fr
OL	64	Matt Frank	Sr
OL	79	Raymond Gillespie	Fr
WR	13	Ishmael Hyman	Jr
OL	60	Jahee Jackson	Fr
RB	25	Cardon Johnson	Jr
QB	12	Cole Johnson	Fr
RB	22	Eric Kirlew	Fr
OL	76	Mitchell Kirsch	Sr
TE	88	Jonathan Kloosterman	Jr
WR	84	Ryan Kluck	Fr
WR	8	John Miller	Jr
QB	2	Connor Mitch	Jr
WR	81	Cory Owen	Fr
QB	16	Neeshant Parikh	So
RB	34	Simba Parker	Jr
OL	73	Mac Patrick	Fr
TE	82	Zach Polglase	Fr
WR	11	Brandon Ravenel	Sr
WR	85	Quintin Reynolds	So
TE	98	Lawton Riggs	Fr
OL	62	Kyle Rigney	Sr
OL	78	Zach Rugg	Sr
TE	15	Daniel Schiele	Sr
QB	17	Bryan Schor	Sr
RB	1	Trai Sharp	So
OL	77	Robert Snead	Fr
WR	10	Riley Stapleton	Fr
OL	70	Aaron Stinnie	Jr
WR	3	Domo Taylor	Sr
OL	63	J.T. Timming	Fr
QB	19	Mack Waldman	So
WR	39	Robbie Walker	Jr
WR	89	Braxton Westfield	Fr
RB	20	Taylor Woods	Jr
OL	71	Richard Xu	So

Defense

Pos.	#	Name	Class
DB	27	D'Angelo Amos	Fr
LB	93	Andrew Ankrah	Jr
DL	95	Adeeb Atariwa	Fr
LB	54	Kelvin Azanama	Fr
CB	34	Justin Bethea	Jr
S	21	Robert Branch	So
DL	53	Jordan Brooks	Fr
DL	84	Brandon Brown	Jr
S	44	Jordan Brown	Jr
LB/LS	59	Daniel Caracciolo	Fr
DL	47	Darrious Carter	So
CB	36	Robert Carter Jr.	So
S	38	Mike Cobbs	So
S	48	Reggie Collins	Fr
DL	97	John Daka	Fr
LB	46	David Ezeagwu	Jr
S	5	Raven Greene	Jr
LB	9	Kyre Hawkins	Jr
LB	49	Brandon Hereford	Jr
LB	2	Dimitri Holloway	So
S	40	Ryan Horner	Fr
S	35	Marcell Johnson	Jr
LB	27	Pat Kagel	So
LB	16	John Kinney	Fr
DL	90	Rondre Knowles-Tener	Fr
LB	50	Christian Launius	Fr
DL	92	Mike Mabry	Fr
S	43	Bryce Maginley	Fr
LB	51	Devin Medley	Fr
LB	52	Nick Michalski	Jr
CB	37	Jimmy Moreland	So
CB	26	Curtis Oliver	So
LB	18	Tabb Patrick	Fr
CB	14	Taylor Reynolds	Sr
DL	31	Kirk Robinette	Fr
CB	22	Rashad Robinson	So
DL	74	Simeyon Robinson	Jr
DL	65	Dorrius Rodgers	Fr
LB	10	Jacob Rosen	Fr
LB/LS	41	Brett Siegel	Jr
S	30	Adam Smith	Fr
LB	33	Gage Steele	Sr
DL	91	Martez Stone	Sr
CB	23	Charles Tutt	So
DL	94	Cornell Urquhart	Jr
LB	24	Justin Wellons	Sr
S	28	Grant Westbrook	So
DB	7	Trey Wilson	Fr
DL	72	Gary Wortham	Sr

Special teams

Pos.	#	Name	Class
K/P	42	Pat Frio	Jr
P	69	John Gardiner	Fr
K	45	Tyler Gray	So
P	99	Gunnar Kane	Sr
K/P	57	Jeremiah McBride	Fr
K	91	Ethan Ratke	Fr
LS	56	Matt Wolcott	So

Head coach

- Mike Houston
  1st year at James Madison
  Alma mater: Mars Hill

Coordinators/assistant coaches

- Donnie Kirkpatrick
  Offensive coordinator/quarterbacks
  1st year at James Madison
  Alma mater: Lenoir-Rhyne
- Bob Trott
  Defensive coordinator
  1st year at James Madison
  Alma mater: North Carolina
- Bryan Stinespring
  Tight ends/Run-Game coordinator
  1st year at James Madison
  Alma mater: James Madison
- John Bowers
  Outside Linebackers
  3rd year at James Madison
  Alma mater: James Madison
- Byron Thweatt
  Inside Linebackers
  1st year at James Madison
  Alma mater: Virginia
- Jamal Powell
  Offensive line
  2nd year at James Madison
  Alma mater: Texas Christian
- Jeff Hanson
  Defensive line
  2nd year at James Madison
  Alma mater: Richmond
- Tripp Weaver
  Cornerbacks
  1st year at James Madison
  Alma mater: East Carolina
- De'Rail Sims
  Running backs
  1st year at James Madison
  Alma mater: Pikeville
- Drew Dudzik
  Wide receivers
  1st year at James Madison
  Alma mater: James Madison
- Dale Steele
  Director of football administration/recruiting coordinator
  1st year at James Madison
  Alma mater: South Carolina
- John Williams
  Director of strength and conditioning
- Markus James
  Assistant Director of strength and conditioning
- Pete Johnson
  Football Equipment Manager
- Patty Dorfer
  Administrative Assistant
- Scott Cook
  Associate Athletic Trainer
- Cal Hall
  Assistant Athletic Trainer

Legend

- (C) Team captain
- (S) Suspended
- (I) Ineligible
- Injured
- Redshirt

Roster
Last update: December 17, 2016

== Game summaries ==
=== Morehead State ===
	1	2	3	4	Total
Eagles	0	7	0	0	7
#12 Dukes	28	24	21	7	80

=== Central Connecticut ===
	1	2	3	4	Total
Blue Devils	0	7	14	0	21
#12 Dukes	21	14	7	14	56

=== At North Carolina ===
	1	2	3	4	Total
#11 Dukes	21	0	7	0	28
Tar Heels	14	21	14	7	56

=== At Maine ===
	1	2	3	4	Total
#11 Dukes	7	3	7	14	31
Black Bears	0	13	7	0	20

=== Delaware ===
	1	2	3	4	Total
Fightin' Blue Hens	0	7	0	13	20
#7 Dukes	7	19	7	10	43

=== William & Mary ===
	1	2	3	4	Total
Tribe	3	7	0	14	24
#7 Dukes	10	0	7	14	31

=== At New Hampshire ===
	1	2	3	4	Total
#7 Dukes	7	14	7	14	42
Wildcats	0	9	3	27	39

=== Rhode Island ===
	1	2	3	4	Total
Rams	0	7	0	0	7
#8 Dukes	28	21	21	14	84

=== At Richmond ===
	1	2	3	4	Total
#7 Dukes	14	10	6	17	47
#6 Spiders	10	14	7	12	43

=== At Villanova ===
	1	2	3	4	Total
#6 Dukes	7	0	3	10	20
#9 Wildcats	0	7	0	0	7

=== Elon ===
	1	2	3	4	Total
Phoenix	0	7	7	0	14
#6 Dukes	17	10	15	21	63

== FCS Playoffs ==
=== Second Round–New Hampshire ===
	1	2	3	4	Total
#22 Wildcats	7	0	8	7	22
#5 Dukes	3	28	21	3	55

=== Quarterfinals–Sam Houston State ===
	1	2	3	4	Total
#1 Bearkats	0	0	0	7	7
#5 Dukes	21	21	23	0	65

=== Semifinals–North Dakota State ===
	1	2	3	4	Total
#5 Dukes	7	10	0	10	27
#4 Bison	0	7	10	0	17

It was this game that ended NDSU's streak of five consecutive FCS titles.

=== Championship–Youngstown State ===
	1	2	3	4	Total
#13 Penguins	0	7	0	7	14
#5 Dukes	14	7	7	0	28

== Ranking movements ==
Ranking movements Legend: ██ Increase in ranking ██ Decrease in ranking ( ) = First-place votes
	Week													
Poll	Pre	1	2	3	4	5	6	7	8	9	10	11	12	Final
STATS FCS	12	12	11	11	7	7	7	8	8	7	6	6	5 (1)	1 (154)
Coaches	11	11	8	7	6	6	6	5 (1)	5	5	5	5 (1)	5	1 (26)
FCS Playoffs	Not released									5	4	4	Not released	
