= 2016 Colonial Athletic Association football season =

2016 CAA football season
- League: NCAA Division I Football Championship
- Sport: Football
- Duration: September 1, 2016 – November 19, 2016
- Teams: 12
- TV partner(s): NBCSN; Comcast SportsNet; American Sports Network; CAA.TV

CAA football seasons
- ← 2015 2017 →

2016 Colonial Athletic Association football standings
	Conf.			Overall
Team	W		L	W		L
No. 1 James Madison $^	8	–	0	14	–	1
No. 11 Villanova ^	6	–	2	9	–	4
No. 17 New Hampshire ^	6	–	2	8	–	5
No. 8 Richmond ^	5	–	3	10	–	4
Maine	5	–	3	6	–	5
Albany	4	–	4	7	–	4
Stony Brook	4	–	4	5	–	6
William & Mary	3	–	5	5	–	6
Towson	3	–	5	4	–	7
Delaware	2	–	6	4	–	7
Elon	1	–	7	2	–	9
Rhode Island	1	–	7	2	–	9
$ – Conference champion; ^ – FCS playoff participant; Rankings from STATS Poll

The 2016 Colonial Athletic Association football season was the tenth season of football for the Colonial Athletic Association (CAA) and part of the 2016 NCAA Division I FCS football season.

== Head coaches ==
Team	Coach	Season	Overall Record	Record at School	CAA Record
Albany	Greg Gattuso	3rd	107–45 (.704)	10–13 (.435)	5–11 (.313)
Delaware	Dave Brock	4th	17–18 (.486)	17–18 (.486)	11–13 (.458)
Elon	Rich Skrosky	3rd	6–26 (.188)	5–18 (.217)	3–13 (.188)
James Madison	Mike Houston	1st	43–19 (.694)	14–1 (–)	8–0 (–)
Maine	Joe Harasymiak	1st	0–0 (–)	0–0 (–)	0–0 (–)
New Hampshire	Sean McDonnell	18th	133–78 (.630)	133–78 (.630)	84–55 (.604)
Rhode Island	Jim Fleming	3rd	23–22 (.511)	2–21 (.087)	2–14 (.125)
Richmond	Danny Rocco	5th	80–38 (.678)	33–18 (.647)	21–11 (.656)
Stony Brook	Chuck Priore	11th	101–61 (.623)	62–52 (.544)	10–14 (.417)
Towson	Rob Ambrose	8th	46–48 (.489)	43–41 (.512)	29–29 (.500)
Villanova	Andy Talley	32nd	249–152–2 (.620)	221–133–1 (.624)	136–91 (.599)
William & Mary	Jimmye Laycock	37th	239–173–2 (.580)	239–173–2 (.580)	105–79 (.571)

Records are from before start of 2016 season

== Preseason poll results ==
First place votes in parentheses

Place	School
1	Richmond (19)
2	William & Mary (1)
3	James Madison
4	Villanova
5	New Hampshire (5)
6	Towson
7	Delaware
8	Stony Brook
9	Maine (1)
10	Elon
11	Albany
12	Rhode Island

== Rankings ==
Legend
	Increase in ranking
	Decrease in ranking
	Not ranked previous week
RV	Receiving votes

		Pre	Wk 1	Wk 2	Wk 3	Wk 4	Wk 5	Wk 6	Wk 7	Wk 8	Wk 9	Wk 10	Wk 11	Wk 12	Final
Albany	S		RV	25	22	21	16	17	23	RV	RV		RV	RV	RV
Albany	C		RV	25	23	21	17	19	24	RV	RV			RV	RV
Delaware	S	RV	RV	RV	RV	RV									
Delaware	C		RV	RV	RV										
Elon	S					RV									
Elon	C					RV									
James Madison	S	12	12	11	11	7	7	7	8	8	7	6	6	5	1
James Madison	C	11	11	8	7	6	6	6	5	5	5	5	5	5	1
Maine	S	RV	RV						RV	RV	RV	RV	RV	RV	RV
Maine	C										RV	RV	RV		
New Hampshire	S	22	24	22	RV	RV	RV	RV	RV	RV	22	21	RV	22	17
New Hampshire	C	RV	RV	RV	RV		RV	25	RV	RV	23	23	RV	21	17
Rhode Island	S														
Rhode Island	C														
Richmond	S	4	2	2	7	6	6	6	6	6	6	8	7	12	8
Richmond	C	4	2	2	9	7	7	7	7	6	6	8	7	12	8
Stony Brook	S	RV	RV	RV	20	RV	RV	RV	24	22	25	RV	RV	RV	RV
Stony Brook	C		RV	RV	24	RV	RV	RV	22	20	25				
Towson	S	24	RV	RV	RV	RV	RV								
Towson	C	RV	RV	RV	RV	RV	RV								
Villanova	S	23	22	21	19	17	14	13	16	11	10	9	13	9	11
Villanova	C	22	19	18	15	14	12	11	17	13	12	11	15	11	13
William & Mary	S	9	13	13	8	19	RV	RV							
William & Mary	C	10	13	14	8	17	RV							RV	

== Regular season ==
Index to colors and formatting
CAA member won
CAA member lost
CAA teams in **bold**

All times Eastern time.

Rankings reflect that of the STATS FCS poll for that week.

=== Week One ===
Date	Time	Visiting team	Home team	Site	TV	Result	Attendance	Reference
September 1	7:00 pm	#19 North Dakota	**Stony Brook**	Kenneth P. LaValle Stadium • Stony Brook, NY		**W** 13–9	6,153	
September 1	7:00 pm	Delaware State	**Delaware**	Delaware Stadium • Newark, DE		**W** 56–14	17,835	
September 1	7:00 pm	**Maine**	Connecticut	Pratt & Whitney Stadium at Rentschler Field • East Hartford, CT	ESPN3	**L** 21–24	29,377	
September 1	7:30 pm	**#9 William & Mary**	NC State	Carter–Finley Stadium • Raleigh, NC	ESPN3	**L** 14–48	57,774	
September 2	7:00 pm	**Albany**	Buffalo	University at Buffalo Stadium • Amherst, NY	ESPN3	**W** 22–16	18,657	
September 3	1:30 pm	**#23 Villanova**	Pittsburgh	Heinz Field • Pittsburgh, PA	ESPN3	**L** 7–28	50,149	
September 3	3:30 pm	**#4 Richmond**	Virginia	Scott Stadium • Charlottesville, VA	ESPN3	**W** 37–20	49,270	
September 3	3:30 pm	Gardner–Webb	**Elon**	Rhodes Stadium • Elon, NC		**L** 6–31	7,036	
September 3	6:00 pm	Morehead State	**#12 James Madison**	Bridgeforth Stadium • Harrisonburg, VA		**W** 80–7	23,636	
September 3	7:00 pm	**#24 Towson**	South Florida	Raymond James Stadium • Tampa, FL	ESPN3	**L** 20–56	35,976	
September 3	7:00 pm	**Rhode Island**	Kansas	Memorial Stadium • Lawrence, KS	ESPN3	**L** 6–55	26,864	
September 3	8:30 pm	**#22 New Hampshire**	San Diego State	Qualcomm Stadium • San Diego, CA		**L** 0–31	46,486	

Players of the week:

Offensive		Defensive		Freshman		Special teams	
Player	Team	Player	Team	Player	Team	Player	Team
Kyle Lauletta	Richmond	Jaheem Woods	Stony Brook	Corey Parker	William & Mary	Jake Ryder	Towson

=== Week Two ===
Date	Time	Visiting team	Home team	Site	TV	Result	Attendance	Reference
September 10	1:00 pm	**Stony Brook**	Temple	Lincoln Financial Field • Philadelphia, PA	ESPN3	**L** 0–38	22,296	
September 10	1:00 pm	**Albany**	**Rhode Island**	Meade Stadium • Kingston, RI		**ALB** 35–7	4,511	
September 10	4:00 pm	Central Connecticut	**#12 James Madison**	Bridgeforth Stadium • Harrisonburg, VA		**W** 56–21	20,636	
September 10	6:00 pm	**Delaware**	Lafayette	Fisher Field • Easton, PA		**W** 24–6	6,828	
September 10	6:00 pm	**Elon**	Charlotte	Jerry Richardson Stadium • Charlotte, NC		**L** 14–47	15,807	
September 10	6:00 pm	Norfolk State	**#2 Richmond**	E. Claiborne Robins Stadium • Richmond, VA		**W** 34–0	8,700	
September 10	6:00 pm	Lehigh	**#22 Villanova**	Villanova Stadium • Villanova, PA		**W** 26–21	6,419	
September 10	6:00 pm	**#13 William & Mary**	Hampton	Armstrong Stadium • Hampton, VA		**W** 24–14	4,412	
September 10	6:00 pm	Saint Francis	**Towson**	Johnny Unitas Stadium • Towson, MD		**W** 35–28	8,069	
September 10	7:00 pm	Holy Cross	**#24 New Hampshire**	Wildcat Stadium • Durham, NH	ASN	**W** 39–28	13,242	
September 10	7:00 pm	**Maine**	Toledo	Glass Bowl • Toledo, OH	ESPN3	**L** 3–45	23,439	

Players of the week:

Offensive		Defensive		Freshman		Special teams	
Player	Team	Player	Team	Player	Team	Player	Team
Christian Summers	Towson	Brandon Waller	Richmond	Pop Lacey	New Hampshire	Rashard Davis	James Madison

=== Week Three ===
Date	Time	Visiting team	Home team	Site	TV	Result	Attendance	Reference
September 16	7:00 pm	**Rhode Island**	Harvard	Harvard Stadium • Boston, MA	ASN	**L** 21–51	12,167	
September 17	noon	**#2 Richmond**	**Stony Brook**	Kenneth P. LaValle Stadium • Stony Brook, NY	ASN	**SBU** 42–14	4,450	
September 17	3:30 pm	**#11 James Madison**	North Carolina	Kenan Memorial Stadium • Chapel Hill, NC	ACCN/CSN	**L** 27-56	56,000	
September 17	3:30 pm	**Towson**	**#21 Villanova**	Villanova Stadium • Villanova, PA	CSN	**NOVA** 40–21	9,025	
September 17	6:00 pm	Norfolk State	**#13 William & Mary**	Zable Stadium • Williamsburg, VA		**W** 35–10	10,240	
September 17	6:30 pm	**Delaware**	Wake Forest	BB&T Field • Winston-Salem, NC	ESPN3	**L** 21–38	25,972	
September 17	7:00 pm	Holy Cross	**#25 Albany**	Bob Ford Field • Albany, NY		**W** 45–28	8,040	
September 17	7:00 pm	**#22 New Hampshire**	Dartmouth	Memorial Field • Hanover, NH	FCS	**L** 21–22	8,296	
September 17	7:00 pm	Fayetteville State	**Elon**	Rhodes Stadium • Elon, NC		**W** 26–3	11,250	

Players of the week:

Offensive		Defensive		Freshman		Special teams	
Player	Team	Player	Team	Player	Team	Player	Team
Elijah Ibitokun-Hanks	Albany	Rob Rolle	Villanova	Albert Funderburke	William & Mary	Sherman Alston, Jr.	Stony Brook

=== Week Four ===
Date	Time	Visiting team	Home team	Site	TV	Result	Attendance	Reference
September 24	noon	**#11 James Madison**	**Maine**	Alfond Stadium • Orono, ME	ASN	**JMU** 31–20	8,786	
September 24	1:00 pm	**New Hampshire**	**Rhode Island**	Meade Stadium • Kingston, RI		**UNH** 39–17	3,676	
September 24	3:30 pm	#23 Colgate	**#7 Richmond**	E. Claiborne Robins Stadium • Richmond, VA		**W** 38–31	8,700	
September 24	6:00 pm	Sacred Heart	**#20 Stony Brook**	Kenneth P. LaValle Stadium • Stony Brook, NY		**L** 10–38	7,833	
September 24	6:00 pm	**#19 Villanova**	Lafayette	Fisher Field • Easton, PA		**W** 31–14	7,441	
September 24	7:00 pm	**Elon**	**#8 William & Mary**	Zable Stadium • Williamsburg, VA	CSN	**ELON** 27–10	10,021	
September 24	7:00 pm	Saint Francis	**#22 Albany**	Bob Ford Field • Albany, NY		**W** 20–9	6,309	

Players of the week:

Offensive		Defensive		Freshman		Special teams	
Player	Team	Player	Team	Player	Team	Player	Team
Khalid Abdullah	James Madison	Tanoh Kpassagnon	Villanova	Xavier Goodall	Richmond	Demetrius Oliver	Elon

=== Week Five ===
Date	Time	Visiting team	Home team	Site	TV	Result	Attendance	Reference
October 1	noon	Brown	Rhode Island	Meade Stadium • Kingston, RI		**W** 28–13	5,102	
October 1	1:30 pm	**Delaware**	#7 James Madison	Bridgeforth Stadium • Harrisonburg, VA		**JMU** 43–20	25,236	
October 1	3:30 pm	**Towson**	#6 Richmond	E. Claiborne Robins Stadium • Richmond, VA	CSN	**RICH** 31–28	8,700	
October 1	3:30 pm	**#17 Villanova**	Elon	Rhodes Stadium • Elon, NC		**NOVA** 42–7	10,424	
October 1	3:30 pm	**#19 William & Mary**	New Hampshire	Wildcat Stadium • Durham, NH		**UNH** 21–12	21,943	
October 1	3:30 pm	Bryant	Maine	Alfond Stadium • Orono, ME		**W** 35–31	7,266	

Players of the week:

Offensive		Defensive		Freshman		Special teams	
Player	Team	Player	Team	Player	Team	Player	Team
Zach Bednarczyk; Bryan Schor	Villanova; James Madison	Pat Ricard	Maine	Josh Mack	Maine	Oliver Graybar	Rhode Island

=== Week Six ===
Date	Time	Visiting team	Home team	Site	TV	Result	Attendance	Reference
October 7	7:00 pm	New Hampshire	Elon	Rhodes Stadium • Elon, NC		**UNH** 13–10	4,416	
October 8	noon	Rhode Island	#14 Villanova	Villanova Stadium • Villanova, PA	ASN	**NOVA** 35–0	4,105	
October 8	3:30 pm	#6 Richmond	#16 Albany	Bob Ford Field • Albany, NY		**RICH** 36–30 (3OT)	9,052	
October 8	3:30 pm	Maine	Delaware	Delaware Stadium • Newark, DE		**MAINE** 28–21	18,108	
October 8	3:30 pm	William & Mary	#7 James Madison	Bridgeforth Stadium • Harrisonburg, VA	CSN	**JMU** 31–24	20,354	
October 8	7:00 pm	Stony Brook	Towson	Johnny Unitas Stadium • Towson, MD	CSN	**SBU** 27–20	7,059	

Players of the week:

Offensive		Defensive		Freshman		Special teams	
Player	Team	Player	Team	Player	Team	Player	Team
Wes Hills	Delaware	Jaheem Woods	Stony Brook	Deontez Thompson	Richmond	Morgan Ellman	New Hampshire

=== Week Seven ===
Date	Time	Visiting team	Home team	Site	TV	Result	Attendance	Reference
October 15	noon	#7 James Madison	**New Hampshire**	Wildcat Stadium • Durham, NH	ASN	**JMU** 42–39	8,316	
October 15	noon	#17 Albany	**Maine**	Alfond Stadium • Orono, ME		**MAINE** 20–16	10,443	
October 15	1:30 pm	Towson	Dartmouth	Memorial Field • Hanover, NH		**L** 17–20	3,124	
October 15	3:30 pm	#13 Villanova	**#6 Richmond**	E. Claiborne Robins Stadium • Richmond, VA	CSN	**RICH** 23–0	8,700	
October 15	3:30 pm	Delaware	**William & Mary**	Zable Stadium • Williamsburg, VA		**W&M** 24–17	11,713	
October 15	4:00 pm	Rhode Island	**Stony Brook**	Kenneth P. LaValle Stadium • Stony Brook, NY		**SBU** 14–3	12,221	

Players of the week:

Offensive		Defensive		Freshman		Special teams	
Player	Team	Player	Team	Player	Team	Player	Team
Bryan Schor	James Madison	Tyrice Beverette	Stony Brook	Earnest Edwards	Maine	Griffin Trau	Richmond

=== Week Eight ===
Date	Time	Visiting team	Home team	Site	TV	Result	Attendance	Reference
October 22	noon	**Maine**	**Rhode Island**	Meade Stadium • Kingston, RI		**MAINE** 28–21	4,007	
October 22	1:00 pm	**#24 Stony Brook**	**Delaware**	Delaware Stadium • Newark, DE		**SBU** 28–3	12,972	
October 22	3:30 pm	**#6 Richmond**	**Elon**	Rhodes Stadium • Elon, NC		**RICH** 35–7	8,178	
October 22	3:30 pm	**New Hampshire**	**Towson**	Johnny Unitas Stadium • Towson, MD	CSN	**UNH** 21–7	5,023	
October 22	3:30 pm	**#23 Albany**	**#16 Villanova**	Villanova Stadium • Villanova, PA		**NOVA** 24–13	5,109	

Players of the week:

Offensive		Defensive		Freshman		Special teams	
Player	Team	Player	Team	Player	Team	Player	Team
Aaron Forbes	Villanova	John Haggart	Stony Brook	Deontez Thompson	Richmond	Shane Simpson	Towson

=== Week Nine ===
Date	Time	Visiting team	Home team	Site	TV	Result	Attendance	Reference
October 29	noon	**#22 Stony Brook**	**New Hampshire**	Wildcat Stadium • Durham, NH		**UNH** 43–14	5,029	
October 29	noon	**Elon**	**Albany**	Bob Ford Field • Albany, NY	ASN	**ALB** 27–3	3,916	
October 29	3:30 pm	**Maine**	**William & Mary**	Zable Stadium • Williamsburg, VA		**MAINE** 35–28	9,124	
October 29	3:30 pm	**Rhode Island**	**#8 James Madison**	Bridgeforth Stadium • Harrisonburg, VA		**JMU** 84–7	23,841	
October 29	3:30 pm	**Towson**	**Delaware**	Delaware Stadium • Newark, DE	CSN	**DEL** 20–6	17,488	

Players of the week:

Offensive		Defensive		Freshman		Special teams	
Player	Team	Player	Team	Player	Team	Player	Team
Bryan Schor	James Madison	Quinlen Dean	New Hampshire	Prince Smith	New Hampshire	Micah Wright	Maine

=== Week Ten ===
Date	Time	Visiting team	Home team	Site	TV	Result	Attendance	Reference
November 5	noon	**#10 Villanova**	**Maine**	Alfond Stadium • Orono, ME		**NOVA** 26–7	6,790	
November 5	1:00 pm	**Delaware**	**Albany**	Bob Ford Field • Albany, NY		**DEL** 33–17	4,412	
November 5	2:00 pm	**William & Mary**	**#25 Stony Brook**	Kenneth P. LaValle Stadium • Stony Brook, NY		**W&M** 14–9	5,732	
November 5	2:00 pm	**Elon**	**Towson**	Johnny Unitas Stadium • Towson, MD		**TOW** 23–6	4,009	
November 5	3:30 pm	**#7 James Madison**	**#6 Richmond**	E. Claiborne Robins Stadium • Richmond, VA	CSN	**JMU** 47–43	8,700	

Players of the week:

Offensive		Defensive		Freshman		Special teams	
Player	Team	Player	Team	Player	Team	Player	Team
Bryan Schor	James Madison	Troy Reeder	Delaware	Shane Simpson	Towson	Earnest Edwards	Maine

=== Week Eleven ===
Date	Time	Visiting team	Home team	Site	TV	Result	Attendance	Reference
November 12	noon	William & Mary	Towson	Johnny Unitas Stadium • Towson, MD	ASN	**TOW** 34–24	4,354	
November 12	noon	Albany	#21 New Hampshire	Wildcat Stadium • Durham, NH		**ALB** 36–25	7,012	
November 12	1:00 pm	#6 James Madison	#9 Villanova	Villanova Stadium • Villanova, PA		**JMU** 20–7	6,109	
November 12	1:30 pm	Rhode Island	Elon	Rhodes Stadium • Elon, NC		**URI** 44–14	6,236	
November 12	2:00 pm	Maine	Stony Brook	Kenneth P. LaValle Stadium • Stony Brook, NY		**MAINE** 27–21	5,330	
November 12	3:30 pm	Delaware	#8 Richmond	E. Claiborne Robins Stadium • Richmond, VA	CSN	**RICH** 31–17	8,700	

Players of the week:

Offensive		Defensive		Freshman		Special teams	
Player	Team	Player	Team	Player	Team	Player	Team
Elijah Ibitokun-Hanks	Albany	Cornell Urquhart	James Madison	Shane Simpson	Towson	Justin Rohrwasser	Rhode Island

=== Week Twelve ===
Date	Time	Visiting team	Home team	Site	TV	Result	Attendance	Reference
November 19	noon	#7 Richmond	William & Mary	Zable Stadium • Williamsburg, VA	ASN	**W&M** 34–13	9,740	
November 19	noon	Towson	Rhode Island	Meade Stadium • Kingston, RI		**TOW** 32–31	2,543	
November 19	1:00 pm	Stony Brook	Albany	Bob Ford Field • Albany, NY		**ALB** 13–6	3,836	
November 19	1:00 pm	New Hampshire	Maine	Alfond Stadium • Orono, ME		**UNH** 24–21	6,401	
November 19	1:30 pm	Elon	#6 James Madison	Bridgeforth Stadium • Harrisonburg, VA		**JMU** 63–14	16,184	
November 19	3:30 pm	#13 Villanova	Delaware	Delaware Stadium • Newark, DE	CSN	**NOVA** 41–10	15,987	

Players of the week:

Offensive		Defensive		Freshman		Special teams	
Player	Team	Player	Team	Player	Team	Player	Team
Kendell Anderson	William & Mary	Rayshan Clark	Albany	Cole Johnson	James Madison	Aidan O'Neill	Towson

== FCS Playoffs ==
Date	Time	Visiting team	Home team	Round	Site	TV	Result	Attendance	Reference
November 26	2:00 pm	Saint Francis	#9 Villanova	First Round	Villanova Stadium • Villanova, PA	ESPN3	W 31–21	2,059	
November 26	2:00 pm	#18 Lehigh	#22 New Hampshire	First Round	Wildcat Stadium • Durham, NH	ESPN3	W 64–21	2,240	
November 26	2:00 pm	North Carolina A&T	#12 Richmond	First Round	E. Claiborne Robins Stadium • Richmond, VA	ESPN3	W 39–10	3,281	
December 3	2:00 pm	#22 New Hampshire	#5 James Madison	Second Round	Bridgeforth Stadium • Harrisonburg, VA	ESPN3	JMU 55–22	13,231	
December 3	2:00 pm	#9 Villanova	#7 South Dakota State	Second Round	Dana J. Dykhouse Stadium • Brookings, SD	ESPN3	L 7–10	6,154	
December 3	2:00 pm	#12 Richmond	North Dakota	Second Round	Alerus Center • Grand Forks, ND	ESPN3	W 27–24	9,837	
December 9	7:00 pm	#1 Sam Houston State	#5 James Madison	Quarterfinals	Bridgeforth Stadium • Harrisonburg, VA	ESPN2	W 65–7	15,646	
December 10	4:00 pm	#12 Richmond	#3 Eastern Washington	Quarterfinals	Roos Field • Cheney, WA	ESPN3	L 0–38	5,150	
December 16	7:00 pm	#5 James Madison	#4 North Dakota State	Semifinals	Fargodome • Fargo, ND	ESPN2	W 27–17	18,282	
January 7	noon	#13 Youngstown State	#5 James Madison	Championship	Toyota Stadium • Frisco, TX	ESPN2	W 28–14	14,423	

== Postseason Awards ==
- Coach of the Year – Mike Houston (James Madison)
- Offensive Player of the Year – Bryan Schor, JR, QB (James Madison)
- Defensive Players of the Year – Tanoh Kpassagnon, SR, DL (Villanova)
- Special Teams Player of the Year – Rashard Davis, SR, PR/WR (James Madison)
- Offensive Rookies of the Year – Shane Simpson, FR, RB (Towson)
- Defensive Rookies of the Year – Prince Smith, Jr., FR, CB (New Hampshire)
- Chuck Boone Leadership Award – Casey DeAndrade, SR, CB (New Hampshire)

=== All–Conference Teams ===
Position	First Team		Second Team		Third Team	
Position	Player	Team	Player	Team	Player	Team
QB	Bryan Schor, JR	James Madison	Kyle Lauletta, JR	Richmond	Dan Collins, SR	Maine
RB	Khalid Abdullah, SR; Elijah Ibitokun-Hanks, SO	James Madison; Albany	Kendell Anderson, SR; Dalton Crossan, SR	William & Mary; New Hampshire	Stacey Bedell, JR; Aaron Forbes, SO; Wes Hills, JR	Stony Brook; Villanova; Delaware
FB/HB	Anthony Manzo-Lewis, JR	Albany	James Pavik, SR	Richmond		
WR	Brian Brown, SR; Brandon Ravenel, SR; Micah Wright, SO	Richmond; James Madison; Maine	Ray Bolden, JR; DeVonte Dedmon, JR; Christian Summers, SR	Stony Brook; William & Mary; Towson	Terrence Alls, JR; Andre Dessenberg, SR; Neil O'Connor, SO; Tyler Wilkins, SO	James Madison; Towson; New Hampshire; Richmond
TE	Jonathan Kloosterman, JR	James Madison	Andrew Caskin, JR	William & Mary	Ryan Bell, JR; Garrett Hudson, JR	Villanova; Richmond
OL	Thomas Evans, SR; Mitchell Kirsch, SR; Tad McNeely, SR; Timon Parris, JR; Aaron Stinnie, JR; Jerry Ugokwe, SR	Richmond; James Madison; New Hampshire; Stony Brook; James Madison; William & Mary	Connor Bozick, SR; Matt Frank, SR; Brody Kern, JR; Brad Seaton, SR; Nicholas Vergos, SR	Delaware; James Madison; Delaware; Villanova; Richmond	Max Andrews, SR; Jamil Demby, JR; Chris Durant, JR; Andrew Lauderdale, SR; Kevin Malloy, SR	Maine; Maine; William & Mary; New Hampshire; Albany
PK	Griffin Trau, SO	Richmond	John Gallagher, SR	Elon	Aidan O'Neill, FR	Towson
KR	Shane Simpson, FR	Towson	Harold Cooper, JR	Rhode Island	Earnest Edwards, FR	Maine
PR	Rashard Davis, SR	James Madison	Micah Wright, SO	Maine	Casey DeAndrade, SR	New Hampshire
DL	Andrew Ankrah, JR; Winston Craig, SR; Tanoh Kpassagnon, SR; Patrick Ricard, SR; Cam Shorey, SR	James Madison; Richmond; Villanova; Maine; New Hampshire	Ousmane Camara, JR; Malachi Hoskins, JR; Bilal Nichols, JR; Brandon Waller, JR	Stony Brook; Albany; Delaware; Richmond	Jose Duncan, JR; John Haggart, SO; Bryan Osei, SR; Isaiah Stephens, JR	Rhode Island; Stony Brook; Villanova; William & Mary
LB	Charles Bell, JR; Austin Calitro, SR; Omar Howard, SR; Michael Nicastro, SR; Christophe Mulumba-Tshimanga, SR	Delaware; Villanova; Richmond; Albany; Maine	Shane Lawless, SO; Troy Reeder, SO; John Silas, SR; Gage Steele, SR	Stony Brook; Delaware; Elon; James Madison	DeVaughn Chollette, SR; Stephen Lubnow, SO; Sterling Sheffield, SO; Ed Shockley, JR	New Hampshire; William & Mary; Maine; Villanova
CB	Casey DeAndrade, SR; Taylor Reynolds, SR	New Hampshire; James Madison	Rayshan Clark, SR; Trey Reed, SR	Albany; William & Mary	Nassir Adderley, SO; Najee Goode, JR; Darin Peart, JR	Delaware; Maine; Stony Brook
S	Raven Greene, JR; Rob Rolle, JR	James Madison; Villanova	Tyrice Beverette, JR; Jaheem Woods, SR	Stony Brook; Stony Brook	Brendan Coniker, JR; Monty Fenner, JR; Pop Lacey, FR	Richmond; Towson; New Hampshire
P	Jake Ryder, SR	Towson	Gunnar Kane, SR	James Madison	John Hinchen, JR	Villanova

== Records against other conferences ==
Conference	Record
ACC	1–4
American	0–3
Big 12	0–1
Big Sky	2–1
Big South	0–1
CIAA	1–0
C–USA	0–1
Ivy League	1–3
MAC	1–1
MEAC	5–0
MVFC	0–1
MW	0–1
NEC	5–1
Patriot	7–0
PFL	1–0
Southland	1–0
FBS Total	2–11
FCS Total	22–7
D-II Total	1–0
Total	25–18

== Attendance ==
Team	Stadium	Capacity	Game 1	Game 2	Game 3	Game 4	Game 5	Game 6	Game 7	Game 8	Total	Average	% of Capacity
Albany	Bob Ford Field	8,500	8,040	6,309	9,052	3,916	4,412	3,836			35,565	5,928	70%
Delaware	Delaware Stadium	22,000	17,835	18,108	12,972	17,488	15,987				82,400	16,480	75%
Elon	Rhodes Stadium	11,250	7,036	11,250	10,424	4,416	8,178	6,236			47,540	7,923	70%
James Madison	Bridgeforth Stadium	24,877	23,636	20,636	25,236	20,354	23,841	16,184	13,231	15,646	158,464	19,808	80%
Maine	Alfond Stadium	10,000	8,786	7,266	10,443	6,790	6,401				39,686	7,937	79%
New Hampshire	Wildcat Stadium	11,015	13,242	21,943	8,136	5,029	7,012	2,240			57,582	9,597	87%
Rhode Island	Meade Stadium	6,555	4,511	3,676	5,102	4,007	2,543				19,839	3,968	61%
Richmond	E. Claiborne Robins Stadium	8,700	8,700	8,700	8,700	8,700	8,700	8,700	3,281		55,481	7,926	91%
Stony Brook	Kenneth P. LaValle Stadium	8,136	6,153	4,450	7,833	12,221	5,732	5,330			41,719	6,953	85%
Towson	Johnny Unitas Stadium	11,198	8,069	7,059	5,023	4,009	4,354				28,514	5,703	51%
Villanova	Villanova Stadium	12,000	6,419	9,025	4,105	5,109	6,109	2,059			33,006	5,501	46%
William & Mary	Zable Stadium	12,259	10,240	10,021	11,713	9,124	9,740				50,838	10,168	83%

== NFL draft ==
The following list includes all CAA players who were drafted in the 2017 NFL draft.

Round #	Pick #	NFL team	Player	Position	College
2	59	Kansas City Chiefs	Tanoh Kpassagnon	DE	Villanova
7	236	Tennessee Titans	Brad Seaton	T	Villanova
