= Dennis Dottin-Carter =

American football player and coach (born 1981)

Current position
- Title: Defensive line coach
- Team: Rutgers
- Conference: Big Ten

Biographical details
- Born: February 4, 1981 (age 45); Cambridge, Massachusetts, U.S.

Playing career
- 1999–2003: Maine
- Position: Linebacker

Coaching career (HC unless noted)
- 2008: Maine (TE)
- 2009: Maine (FB/TE)
- 2010: Maine (RB/FB/TE)
- 2011: Maine (DL)
- 2012: Maine (ST/DL)
- 2013: Delaware (DL)
- 2014–2016: Delaware (co-DC/DL)
- 2016: Delaware (interim HC)
- 2017–2021: Connecticut (DL)
- 2022: Yale (AHC/co-DC/DL)
- 2023–2024: Minnesota (senior DA)
- 2025: Minnesota (DL)
- 2026–present: Rutgers (DL)

Head coaching record
- Overall: 2−3

Dennis Dottin-Carter (born February 4, 1981) is an American football coach and former player. He is currently the defensive line coach for Rutgers University. He served as the interim head coach at Delaware in 2016, having been named to the position on October 16, 2016. He previously has been an assistant coach at both Delaware and the University of Maine. He played football for Maine under coach Jack Cosgrove.

== Head coaching record ==
Year	Team	Overall	Conference	Standing	Bowl/playoffs
Delaware Fightin' Blue Hens (Colonial Athletic Association) (2016)
2016	Delaware	2−3 (Note: Delaware had a record of 2–4 (0–3 CAA) prior to Dave Brock being relieved of head coaching duties.)	2−3	10th	
Delaware:		2−3	2−3		
Total:		2−3			
