= Aaron Stinnie =

American football player (born 1994)

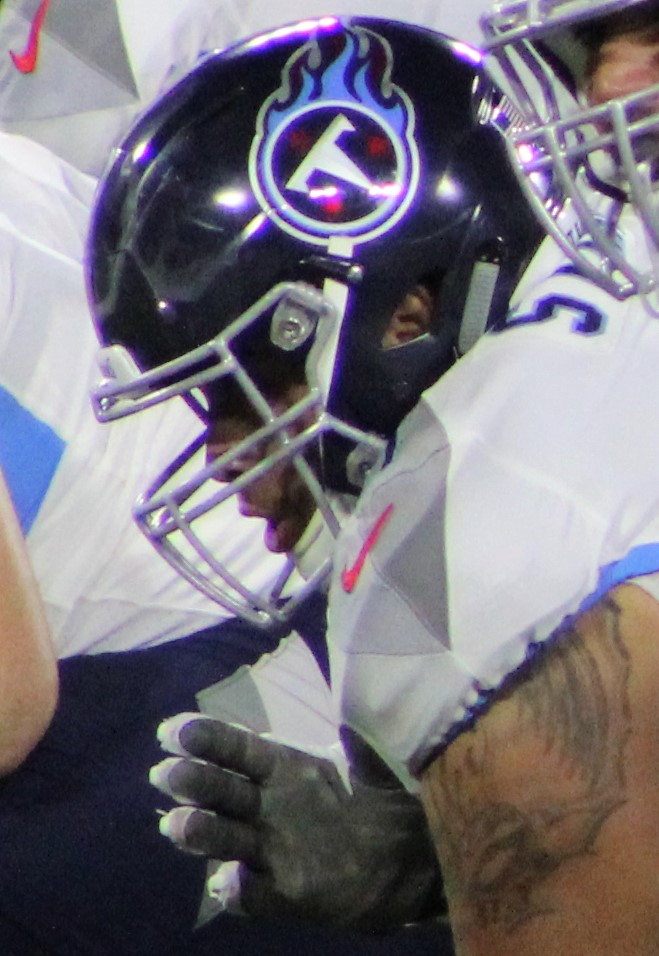
- Stinnie with the Tennessee Titans in 2018

No. 64 – New York Giants
- Position: Guard
- Roster status: Active

Personal information
- Born: February 18, 1994 (age 32); Charlottesville, Virginia, U.S.
- Listed height: 6 ft 3 in (1.91 m)
- Listed weight: 312 lb (142 kg)

Career information
- High school: St. Anne's-Belfield (Charlottesville)
- College: James Madison (2013–2017)
- NFL draft: 2018: undrafted

Career history
- Tennessee Titans (2018–2019); Tampa Bay Buccaneers (2019–2023); New York Giants (2024–present)

Awards and highlights
- Super Bowl champion (LV); FCS national champion (2016); 2× FCS All-American (2016, 2017); 2× First-team All-CAA (2016, 2017)

Career NFL statistics as of 2025
- Games played: 64
- Games started: 16
- Stats at Pro Football Reference

Aaron Phillip Stinnie (born February 18, 1994) is an American professional football guard for the New York Giants of the National Football League (NFL). He played college football for the James Madison Dukes. He has previously played in the NFL for the Tampa Bay Buccaneers.

== Early life ==
Stinnie was born and grew up in Charlottesville, Virginia and attended St. Anne's-Belfield School. He focused on basketball and did not begin playing football until his junior year after joining the team at the insistence of his friends.

== College career ==
After redshirting his freshman season, Stinnie began his career with the Dukes as a defensive lineman, recording 11 tackles and 1.5 sacks in 12 games in his first season of playing time, before moving over to the offensive line going into his redshirt sophomore season. Stinnie became a three-year starter for JMU, starting 42 consecutive games to end his career, and was an FCS All-America selection for his redshirt junior and senior seasons.

== Professional career ==
Pre-draft measurables
Height	Weight	Arm length	Hand span	Wingspan	40-yard dash	10-yard split	20-yard split	20-yard shuttle	Three-cone drill	Vertical jump	Broad jump	Bench press
6 ft 3 1/2 in (1.92 m)	312 lb (142 kg)	34 1/4 in (0.87 m)	9 1/2 in (0.24 m)	6 ft 9 3/4 in (2.08 m)	5.23 s	1.88 s	3.00 s	4.65 s	7.63 s	27.0 in (0.69 m)	8 ft 6 in (2.59 m)	21 reps
All values from Pro Day

=== Tennessee Titans ===
Stinnie signed with the Tennessee Titans as an undrafted free agent on April 28, 2018, and made the final 53-man roster out of training camp. Stinnie made his NFL debut, the only regular season appearance of his rookie season, on October 21, 2018, against the Los Angeles Chargers.

On August 31, 2019, Stinnie was waived by the Titans and was signed to the practice squad the next day. He was promoted to the active roster on September 7, 2019, before the season opener. He was waived on November 9.

=== Tampa Bay Buccaneers ===
On November 11, 2019, Stinnie was claimed off waivers by the Tampa Bay Buccaneers. Stinnie appeared in five games, three with the Titans and two with the Buccaneers, during the 2019 season. Stinnie appeared in six games during the 2020 regular season. Stinnie made his first professional start in the divisional round of the playoffs against the New Orleans Saints after starting right guard Alex Cappa fractured his ankle in the wild-card round. He started the final three games of the playoffs, including Super Bowl LV as the Buccaneers beat the Kansas City Chiefs.

Stinnie signed a contract extension with the Buccaneers on March 17, 2021. He made his first career regular season start in Week 12 in place of an injured Ali Marpet. He suffered a knee injury in that game and was placed on injured reserve on December 1, 2021. He was activated on January 8, 2022. In the 2021 season, he appeared in six games and started one.

On March 13, 2022, Stinnie re-signed with the Buccaneers. He suffered a torn ACL in the preseason and was placed on injured reserve on August 22, 2022.

On March 15, 2023, Stinnie re-signed with the Buccaneers. He appeared in 13 games and started 11 in the 2023 season.

=== New York Giants ===
On March 15, 2024, Stinnie signed with the New York Giants. He was named a backup guard, starting three games at left guard as an injury fill-in.

On March 25, 2025, Stinnie re-signed with the Giants. He played in all 17 games with one start at left guard in 2025.

On March 12, 2026, Stinnie re-signed with the Giants.

== Personal life ==
Stinnie's father, Phil Stinnie, played college basketball at Virginia Commonwealth and is seventh on the school's all-time scoring list.
