= 2016 Rhode Island Rams football team =

American college football season

2016 Rhode Island Rams football
- Conference: Colonial Athletic Association
- Record: 2–9 (1–7 CAA)
- Head coach: Jim Fleming (3rd season)
- Defensive coordinator: Pete Rekstis (3rd season)
- Home stadium: Meade Stadium

2016 Colonial Athletic Association football standings
	Conf.			Overall
Team	W		L	W		L
No. 1 James Madison $^	8	–	0	14	–	1
No. 11 Villanova ^	6	–	2	9	–	4
No. 17 New Hampshire ^	6	–	2	8	–	5
No. 8 Richmond ^	5	–	3	10	–	4
Maine	5	–	3	6	–	5
Albany	4	–	4	7	–	4
Stony Brook	4	–	4	5	–	6
William & Mary	3	–	5	5	–	6
Towson	3	–	5	4	–	7
Delaware	2	–	6	4	–	7
Elon	1	–	7	2	–	9
Rhode Island	1	–	7	2	–	9
$ – Conference champion; ^ – FCS playoff participant; Rankings from STATS Poll

The 2016 Rhode Island Rams football team represented the University of Rhode Island in the 2016 NCAA Division I FCS football season. They were led by third year head coach Jim Fleming and played their home games at Meade Stadium. They were a member of the Colonial Athletic Association. They finished the season 2–9, 1–7 in CAA play to finish in a tie for 11th place.

== Schedule ==
Date	Time	Opponent	Site	TV	Result	Attendance
September 3	7:00 pm	at Kansas*	Memorial Stadium; Lawrence, KS	ESPN3	L 6–55	26,864
September 10	1:00 pm	Albany	Meade Stadium; Kingston, RI	A10 Network	L 7–35	4,511
September 16	7:00 pm	at Harvard*	Harvard Stadium; Boston, MA	ASN	L 21–51	12,167
September 24	1:00 pm	New Hampshire	Meade Stadium; Kingston, RI	A10 Network	L 17–39	3,626
October 1	12:00 pm	Brown*	Meade Stadium; Kingston, RI (Governor's Cup)	A10 Network	W 28–13	5,102
October 8	12:00 pm	at No. 14 Villanova	Villanova Stadium; Villanova, PA	ASN	L 0–35	4,105
October 15	4:00 pm	at Stony Brook	Kenneth P. LaValle Stadium; Stony Brook, NY	CSL	L 3–14	12,221
October 22	12:00 pm	Maine^{†}	Meade Stadium; Kingston, RI	A10 Network	L 21–28	4,007
October 29	3:30 pm	at No. 8 James Madison	Bridgeforth Stadium; Harrisonburg, VA	MadiZone	L 7–84	23,841
November 12	1:30 pm	at Elon	Rhodes Stadium; Elon, NC	PAA	W 44–14	6,236
November 19	12:00 pm	Towson	Meade Stadium; Kingston, RI	A10 Network	L 31–32	2,543
*Non-conference game; ^{†}Homecoming; Rankings from STATS Poll released prior to the game; All times are in Eastern time

== Game summaries ==
=== At Kansas ===
	1	2	3	4	Total
Rams	0	6	0	0	6
Jayhawks	13	14	14	14	55

=== Albany ===
	1	2	3	4	Total
Great Danes	7	7	7	14	35
Rams	0	7	0	0	7

=== At Harvard ===
	1	2	3	4	Total
Rams	0	7	0	14	21
Crimson	21	3	13	14	51

=== New Hampshire ===
	1	2	3	4	Total
Wildcats	7	8	7	17	39
Rams	7	0	3	7	17

=== Brown ===
	1	2	3	4	Total
Bears	6	7	0	0	13
Rams	7	0	7	14	28

=== At Villanova ===
	1	2	3	4	Total
Rams	0	0	0	0	0
#14 Wildcats	21	7	7	0	35

=== At Stony Brook ===
	1	2	3	4	Total
Rams	3	0	0	0	3
Seawolves	0	0	0	14	14

=== Maine ===
	1	2	3	4	Total
Black Bears	7	7	7	7	28
Rams	0	7	7	7	21

=== At James Madison ===
	1	2	3	4	Total
Rams	0	7	0	0	7
#8 Dukes	28	21	21	14	84

=== At Elon ===
	1	2	3	4	Total
Rams	3	10	10	21	44
Phoenix	7	0	0	7	14

=== Towson ===
	1	2	3	4	Total
Tigers	7	13	3	9	32
Rams	7	3	7	14	31

== Coaching staff ==
Rhode Island Rams
Name	Position	Consecutive season at Rhode Island in current position	Previous position
Jim Fleming	Head coach	3rd	UCF defensive coordinator (2012–2013)
Ari Confesor	Wide receivers coach	3rd	Rhode Island linebackers coach (2013)
Joe Coniglio	Defensive line coach	3rd	Northern Michigan defensive line coach (2012–2013)
Mark Criner	Linebackers coach	1st	Lamar linebackers coach (2014–2015)
Will Fleming	Quarterbacks coach	1st	Rhode Island tight ends coach (2014–2015)
Troy Gilmer	Defensive assistant	3rd	Akron graduate assistant (2013)
Keegan Kennedy	Offensive line coach	1st	UCF special teams coordinator and tight ends coach (2015)
Jim Miceli	Running backs coach	1st	Rhode Island quarterbacks coach (2014–2015)
Pete Rekstis	Defensive coordinator and defensive backs coach	3rd	Florida Atlantic defensive backs coach (2012–2013)
Diamond Weaver	Cornerbacks coach	1st	Rhode Island wide receivers coach (2014–2015)
