= Brad Seaton =

American football player (born 1993)

No. 62
- Position: Offensive tackle

Personal information
- Born: November 23, 1993 (age 32); The Bronx, New York, U.S.
- Listed height: 6 ft 9 in (2.06 m)
- Listed weight: 325 lb (147 kg)

Career information
- High school: Brunswick (Greenwich, Connecticut)
- College: Villanova
- NFL draft: 2017: 7th round, 236th overall pick

Career history
- Tennessee Titans (2017)*; Tampa Bay Buccaneers (2017–2018)*; Cleveland Browns (2018–2019)*; Tampa Bay Buccaneers (2019–2021)*
- * Offseason or practice squad member only

Awards and highlights
- Super Bowl champion (LV)
- Stats at Pro Football Reference

Bradley Seaton (born November 23, 1993) is an American former professional football player who was an offensive tackle in the National Football League (NFL). He played college football for the Villanova Wildcats.

== Professional career ==
=== Tennessee Titans ===
Seaton was selected by the Tennessee Titans in the seventh round, 236th overall, in the 2017 NFL draft. He was waived on September 2, 2017. He was re-signed to the practice squad on September 20, 2017. He was released on November 9, 2017.

=== Tampa Bay Buccaneers (first stint) ===
On November 29, 2017, Seaton was signed to the Tampa Bay Buccaneers' practice squad. He signed a reserve/future contract with the Buccaneers on January 3, 2018.

=== Cleveland Browns ===
The Cleveland Browns signed Seaton to their practice squad on September 4, 2018. The Browns signed Seaton to a futures contract on January 2, 2019. Seaton was waived by the Browns on August 31, 2019.

=== Tampa Bay Buccaneers (second stint) ===
On September 1, 2019, Seaton was signed to the Buccaneers practice squad. He signed a reserve/future contract with the Buccaneers on December 30, 2019.

On August 6, 2020, Seaton opted out of the 2020 season due to the COVID-19 pandemic. Without him, the Buccaneers went on to win Super Bowl LV.

On August 31, 2021, Seaton was waived/injured by the Buccaneers and placed on injured reserve. He was released on October 21.

On April 19, 2022, Seaton announced his retirement.
