= 2016 Towson Tigers football team =

American college football season

2016 Towson Tigers football
- Conference: Colonial Athletic Association
- Record: 4–7 (3–5 CAA)
- Head coach: Rob Ambrose (8th season)
- Offensive coordinator: Jared Ambrose (5th season)
- Defensive coordinator: Matt Hachmann (7th season)
- Home stadium: Johnny Unitas Stadium

2016 Colonial Athletic Association football standings
| | Conf. | | | Overall |
| Team | W | | L | W | | L |
|---|---|---|---|---|---|---|
| No. 1 James Madison $^ | 8 | – | 0 | 14 | – | 1 |
| No. 11 Villanova ^ | 6 | – | 2 | 9 | – | 4 |
| No. 17 New Hampshire ^ | 6 | – | 2 | 8 | – | 5 |
| No. 8 Richmond ^ | 5 | – | 3 | 10 | – | 4 |
| Maine | 5 | – | 3 | 6 | – | 5 |
| Albany | 4 | – | 4 | 7 | – | 4 |
| Stony Brook | 4 | – | 4 | 5 | – | 6 |
| William & Mary | 3 | – | 5 | 5 | – | 6 |
| Towson | 3 | – | 5 | 4 | – | 7 |
| Delaware | 2 | – | 6 | 4 | – | 7 |
| Elon | 1 | – | 7 | 2 | – | 9 |
| Rhode Island | 1 | – | 7 | 2 | – | 9 |
$ – Conference champion; ^ – FCS playoff participant; Rankings from STATS Poll

The 2016 Towson Tigers football team represented Towson University in the 2016 NCAA Division I FCS football season. They were led by eighth-year head coach Rob Ambrose and played their home games at Johnny Unitas Stadium. They were a member of the Colonial Athletic Association. They finished the season 4–7, 3–5 in CAA play to finish in a tie for eighth place.

== Schedule ==
| Date | Time | Opponent | Rank | Site | TV | Result | Attendance |
|---|---|---|---|---|---|---|---|
| September 3 | 7:00 pm | at South Florida* | No. 24 | Raymond James Stadium; Tampa, FL | ESPN3 | L 20–56 | 35,976 |
| September 10 | 6:00 pm | Saint Francis (PA)* | | Johnny Unitas Stadium; Towson, MD | TSN | W 35–28 | 8,069 |
| September 17 | 3:30 pm | at No. 21 Villanova | | Villanova Stadium; Villanova, PA | CSN | L 21–40 | 9,025 |
| October 1 | 3:30 pm | at No. 6 Richmond | | E. Claiborne Robins Stadium; Richmond, VA | CSN | L 28–31 | 8,700 |
| October 8 | 7:00 pm | Stony Brook | | Johnny Unitas Stadium; Towson, MD | CSN | L 20–27 | 7,059 |
| October 15 | 1:30 pm | at Dartmouth* | | Memorial Field; Hanover, NH | ILDN | L 17–20 | 3,124 |
| October 22 | 3:30 pm | New Hampshire | | Johnny Unitas Stadium; Towson, MD | CSN | L 7–21 | 5,023 |
| October 29 | 3:30 pm | at Delaware | | Delaware Stadium; Newark, DE | CSN | L 6–20 | 17,488 |
| November 5 | 2:00 pm | Elon | | Johnny Unitas Stadium; Towson, MD | TSN | W 23–6 | 4,009 |
| November 12 | 12:00 pm | William & Mary | | Johnny Unitas Stadium; Towson, MD | ASN | W 34–24 | 4,354 |
| November 19 | 12:00 pm | at Rhode Island | | Meade Stadium; Kingston, RI | A10 Network | W 32–31 | 2,543 |
*Non-conference game; Rankings from STATS Poll released prior to the game; All times are in Eastern time

== Game summaries ==
=== At South Florida ===
| | 1 | 2 | 3 | 4 | Total |
|---|---|---|---|---|---|
| #24 Tigers | 3 | 7 | 7 | 3 | 20 |
| Bulls | 14 | 14 | 21 | 7 | 56 |

=== Saint Francis (PA) ===
| | 1 | 2 | 3 | 4 | Total |
|---|---|---|---|---|---|
| Red Flash | 7 | 21 | 0 | 0 | 28 |
| Tigers | 3 | 10 | 15 | 7 | 35 |

=== At Villanova ===
| | 1 | 2 | 3 | 4 | Total |
|---|---|---|---|---|---|
| Tigers | 7 | 7 | 0 | 7 | 21 |
| #21 Wildcats | 7 | 19 | 0 | 14 | 40 |

=== At Richmond ===
| | 1 | 2 | 3 | 4 | Total |
|---|---|---|---|---|---|
| Tigers | 7 | 14 | 7 | 0 | 28 |
| #6 Spiders | 7 | 14 | 3 | 7 | 31 |

=== Stony Brook ===
| | 1 | 2 | 3 | 4 | Total |
|---|---|---|---|---|---|
| Seawolves | 7 | 0 | 7 | 13 | 27 |
| Tigers | 7 | 10 | 0 | 3 | 20 |

=== At Dartmouth ===
| | 1 | 2 | 3 | 4 | Total |
|---|---|---|---|---|---|
| Tigers | 7 | 0 | 10 | 0 | 17 |
| Big Green | 3 | 10 | 7 | 0 | 20 |

=== New Hampshire ===
| | 1 | 2 | 3 | 4 | Total |
|---|---|---|---|---|---|
| Wildcats | 7 | 7 | 7 | 0 | 21 |
| Tigers | 0 | 7 | 0 | 0 | 7 |

=== At Delaware ===
| | 1 | 2 | 3 | 4 | Total |
|---|---|---|---|---|---|
| Tigers | 0 | 3 | 3 | 0 | 6 |
| Fightin' Blue Hens | 0 | 10 | 3 | 7 | 20 |

=== Elon ===
| | 1 | 2 | 3 | 4 | Total |
|---|---|---|---|---|---|
| Phoenix | 0 | 3 | 3 | 0 | 6 |
| Tigers | 10 | 3 | 0 | 10 | 23 |

=== William & Mary ===
| | 1 | 2 | 3 | 4 | Total |
|---|---|---|---|---|---|
| Tribe | 7 | 14 | 3 | 0 | 24 |
| Tigers | 3 | 7 | 14 | 10 | 34 |

=== At Rhode Island ===
| | 1 | 2 | 3 | 4 | Total |
|---|---|---|---|---|---|
| Tigers | 7 | 13 | 3 | 9 | 32 |
| Rams | 7 | 3 | 7 | 14 | 31 |

== Ranking movements ==
Ranking movements Legend: ██ Increase in ranking ██ Decrease in ranking — = Not ranked RV = Received votes
| | Week | | | | | | | | | | | | | |
| Poll | Pre | 1 | 2 | 3 | 4 | 5 | 6 | 7 | 8 | 9 | 10 | 11 | 12 | Final |
|---|---|---|---|---|---|---|---|---|---|---|---|---|---|---|
| STATS FCS | 24 | RV | RV | RV | RV | RV | — | — | — | — | — | — | — | |
| Coaches | RV | RV | RV | RV | RV | RV | — | — | — | — | — | — | — | |
