= 2016 New Hampshire Wildcats football team =

American college football season

2016 New Hampshire Wildcats football

FCS Playoffs Second Round, L 22–55 vs. James Madison
- Conference: Colonial Athletic Association

Ranking
- STATS: No. 17
- FCS Coaches: No. 17
- Record: 8–5 (6–2 CAA)
- Head coach: Sean McDonnell (18th season)
- Offensive coordinator: Ryan Carty (9th season)
- Defensive coordinator: John Lyons (5th season)
- Home stadium: Wildcat Stadium

2016 Colonial Athletic Association football standings
	Conf.			Overall
Team	W		L	W		L
No. 1 James Madison $^	8	–	0	14	–	1
No. 11 Villanova ^	6	–	2	9	–	4
No. 17 New Hampshire ^	6	–	2	8	–	5
No. 8 Richmond ^	5	–	3	10	–	4
Maine	5	–	3	6	–	5
Albany	4	–	4	7	–	4
Stony Brook	4	–	4	5	–	6
William & Mary	3	–	5	5	–	6
Towson	3	–	5	4	–	7
Delaware	2	–	6	4	–	7
Elon	1	–	7	2	–	9
Rhode Island	1	–	7	2	–	9
$ – Conference champion; ^ – FCS playoff participant; Rankings from STATS Poll

The 2016 New Hampshire Wildcats football team represented the University of New Hampshire in the 2016 NCAA Division I FCS football season. They were led by 18th-year head coach Sean McDonnell and played their home games at Wildcat Stadium. They competed as a member of the Colonial Athletic Association (CAA).

The team's stadium went through major renovations during the offseason. Renamed as Wildcat Stadium, the facility hosted its first game under that name on September 10, with the Wildcats defeating Holy Cross.

The Wildcats finished their regular season with a record of 8–5, 6–2 in CAA play, to finish in a tie for second place. They received an at-large bid to the FCS Playoffs where they defeated Lehigh in the first round before losing in the second round to James Madison.

== Schedule ==
Date	Time	Opponent	Rank	Site	TV	Result	Attendance
September 1	8:30 pm	at San Diego State*	No. 22	Qualcomm Stadium; San Diego, CA		L 0–31	46,486
September 10	7:00 pm	Holy Cross*	No. 24	Wildcat Stadium; Durham, NH	ASN	W 39–28	13,242
September 17	7:00 pm	at Dartmouth*	No. 22	Memorial Field; Hanover, NH (rivalry)	FCS	L 21–22	8,296
September 24	1:00 pm	at Rhode Island		Meade Stadium; Kingston, RI	A10 Network	W 39–17	3,626
October 1	3:30 pm	No. 19 William & Mary^{†}		Wildcat Stadium; Durham, NH	UNHAthletics	W 21–12	21,943
October 7	7:00 pm	at Elon		Rhodes Stadium; Elon, NC	PAA	W 13–10	4,416
October 15	12:00 pm	No. 7 James Madison		Wildcat Stadium; Durham, NH	ASN	L 39–42	8,316
October 22	3:30 pm	at Towson		Johnny Unitas Stadium; Towson, MD	CSN	W 21–7	5,023
October 29	12:00 pm	No. 22 Stony Brook		Wildcat Stadium; Durham, NH	UNHAthletics	W 43–14	5,029
November 12	12:00 pm	Albany	No. 21	Wildcat Stadium; Durham, NH	UNHAthletics	L 25–36	7,012
November 19	1:00 pm	at Maine		Alfond Stadium; Orono, ME (Battle for the Brice–Cowell Musket)	MAA	W 24–21	6,401
November 26	2:00 pm	No. 18 Lehigh*	No. 22	Wildcat Stadium; Durham, NH (NCAA Division I First Round)	ESPN3	W 64–21	2,240
December 3	2:00 pm	at No. 5 James Madison*	No. 22	Bridgeforth Stadium; Harrisonburg, VA (NCAA Division I Second Round)	ESPN3	L 22–55	13,231
*Non-conference game; ^{†}Homecoming; Rankings from STATS Poll released prior to the game; All times are in Eastern time

== Game summaries ==
=== At San Diego State ===
	1	2	3	4	Total
#22 Wildcats	0	0	0	0	0
Aztecs	14	7	3	7	31

=== Holy Cross ===
	1	2	3	4	Total
Crusaders	14	7	7	0	28
#24 Wildcats	6	7	19	7	39

=== At Dartmouth ===
	1	2	3	4	Total
#22 Wildcats	0	14	7	0	21
Big Green	7	0	0	15	22

=== At Rhode Island ===
	1	2	3	4	Total
Wildcats	7	8	7	17	39
Rams	7	0	3	7	17

=== William & Mary ===
	1	2	3	4	Total
#19 Tribe	6	0	0	6	12
Wildcats	0	7	0	14	21

=== At Elon ===
	1	2	3	4	Total
Wildcats	7	0	0	6	13
Phoenix	0	3	7	0	10

=== James Madison ===
	1	2	3	4	Total
#7 Dukes	7	14	7	14	42
Wildcats	0	9	3	27	39

=== At Towson ===
	1	2	3	4	Total
Wildcats	7	7	7	0	21
Tigers	0	7	0	0	7

=== Stony Brook ===
	1	2	3	4	Total
#22 Seawolves	7	0	7	0	14
Wildcats	15	0	21	7	43

=== Albany ===
	1	2	3	4	Total
Great Danes	0	7	15	14	36
#21 Wildcats	8	14	3	0	25

=== At Maine ===
	1	2	3	4	Total
Wildcats	7	0	7	10	24
Black Bears	7	7	0	7	21

=== Lehigh—NCAA Division I First Round ===
	1	2	3	4	Total
#18 Mountain Hawks	0	14	7	0	21
#22 Wildcats	15	21	14	14	64

=== James Madison–NCAA Division I Second Round ===
	1	2	3	4	Total
#22 Wildcats	7	0	8	7	22
#5 Dukes	3	28	21	3	55

== Ranking movements ==
Ranking movements Legend: ██ Increase in ranking ██ Decrease in ranking — = Not ranked RV = Received votes
	Week													
Poll	Pre	1	2	3	4	5	6	7	8	9	10	11	12	Final
STATS FCS	22	24	22	RV	RV	RV	RV	RV	RV	22	21	RV	22	17
Coaches	RV	RV	RV	RV	—	RV	25	RV	RV	23	23	RV	21	17
