= 2016 William & Mary Tribe football team =

American college football season

2016 William & Mary Tribe football
- Conference: Colonial Athletic Association
- Record: 5–6 (3–5 CAA)
- Head coach: Jimmye Laycock (37th season)
- Offensive coordinator: Kevin Rogers (4th season)
- Defensive coordinator: Trevor Andrews (3rd season)
- Captains: Kendell Anderson; Steve Cluley; Peyton Gryder; Trey Reed
- Home stadium: Zable Stadium

2016 Colonial Athletic Association football standings
	Conf.			Overall
Team	W		L	W		L
No. 1 James Madison $^	8	–	0	14	–	1
No. 11 Villanova ^	6	–	2	9	–	4
No. 17 New Hampshire ^	6	–	2	8	–	5
No. 8 Richmond ^	5	–	3	10	–	4
Maine	5	–	3	6	–	5
Albany	4	–	4	7	–	4
Stony Brook	4	–	4	5	–	6
William & Mary	3	–	5	5	–	6
Towson	3	–	5	4	–	7
Delaware	2	–	6	4	–	7
Elon	1	–	7	2	–	9
Rhode Island	1	–	7	2	–	9
$ – Conference champion; ^ – FCS playoff participant; Rankings from STATS Poll

The 2016 William & Mary Tribe football team represented the College of William & Mary as a member of the Colonial Athletic Association (CAA) in the 2016 NCAA Division I FCS football season. The Tribe were led by 37th-year head coach Jimmye Laycock and the team played their home games at Zable Stadium. They finished the season 5–6 overall and 3–5 in CAA play to tie for eighth place.

== Schedule ==
Date	Time	Opponent	Rank	Site	TV	Result	Attendance
September 1	7:30 pm	at NC State*	No. 9	Carter–Finley Stadium; Raleigh, NC	ESPN3	L 14–48	57,774
September 10	6:00 pm	at Hampton*	No. 13	Armstrong Stadium; Hampton, VA	PTV	W 24–14	4,412
September 17	6:00 pm	Norfolk State*	No. 13	Zable Stadium; Williamsburg, VA	TATV	W 35–10	10,240
September 24	7:00 pm	Elon	No. 8	Zable Stadium; Williamsburg, VA	CSN	L 10–27	10,021
October 1	3:30 pm	at New Hampshire	No. 19	Wildcat Stadium; Durham, NH	UNHAthletics	L 12–21	21,943
October 8	3:30 pm	at No. 7 James Madison		Bridgeforth Stadium; Harrisonburg, VA (rivalry)	CSN	L 24–31	20,354
October 15	3:30 pm	Delaware^{†}		Zable Stadium; Williamsburg, VA (rivalry)	TATV	W 24–17	11,713
October 29	3:30 pm	Maine		Zable Stadium; Williamsburg, VA	TATV	L 28–35	9,124
November 5	2:00 pm	at No. 25 Stony Brook		Kenneth P. LaValle Stadium; Stony Brook, NY	CSL	W 14–9	5,732
November 12	12:00 pm	at Towson		Johnny Unitas Stadium; Towson, MD	ASN	L 24–34	4,354
November 19	12:00 pm	No. 7 Richmond		Zable Stadium; Williamsburg, VA (Capital Cup)	ASN	W 34–13	9,740
*Non-conference game; ^{†}Homecoming; Rankings from STATS Poll released prior to the game; All times are in Eastern time

== Game summaries ==
=== At NC State ===
	1	2	3	4	Total
#9 Tribe	7	0	7	0	14
Wolfpack	7	21	7	13	48

=== At Hampton ===
	1	2	3	4	Total
#13 Tribe	7	0	14	3	24
Pirates	7	0	0	7	14

=== Norfolk State ===
	1	2	3	4	Total
Spartans	7	3	0	0	10
#13 Tribe	7	14	7	7	35

=== Elon ===
	1	2	3	4	Total
Phoenix	3	14	7	3	27
#8 Tribe	0	3	7	0	10

=== At New Hampshire ===
	1	2	3	4	Total
#19 Tribe	6	0	0	6	12
Wildcats	0	7	0	14	21

=== At James Madison ===
	1	2	3	4	Total
Tribe	3	7	0	14	24
#7 Dukes	10	0	7	14	31

=== Delaware ===
	1	2	3	4	Total
Fightin' Blue Hens	7	0	7	3	17
Tribe	3	0	0	21	24

=== Maine ===
	1	2	3	4	Total
Black Bears	13	15	7	0	35
Tribe	0	14	14	0	28

=== At Stony Brook ===
	1	2	3	4	Total
Tribe	0	14	0	0	14
#25 Seawolves	7	0	0	2	9

=== At Towson ===
	1	2	3	4	Total
Tribe	7	14	3	0	24
Tigers	3	7	14	10	34

=== Richmond ===
	1	2	3	4	Total
#7 Spiders	7	6	0	0	13
Tribe	3	3	14	14	34

== Rankings ==
Ranking movements Legend: ██ Increase in ranking ██ Decrease in ranking — = Not ranked RV = Received votes
	Week													
Poll	Pre	1	2	3	4	5	6	7	8	9	10	11	12	Final
STATS FCS	9	13	13	8	19	RV	RV	—	—	—	—	—	—	—
Coaches	10	13	14	8	17	RV	—	—	—	—	—	—	—	—
