= 2016 Maine Black Bears football team =

American college football season

2016 Maine Black Bears football
- Conference: Colonial Athletic Association
- Record: 6–5 (5–3 CAA)
- Head coach: Joe Harasymiak (1st season)
- Offensive coordinator: Liam Coen (1st season)
- Defensive coordinator: Corey Hetherman (1st season)
- Home stadium: Alfond Stadium

2016 Colonial Athletic Association football standings
	Conf.			Overall
Team	W		L	W		L
No. 1 James Madison $^	8	–	0	14	–	1
No. 11 Villanova ^	6	–	2	9	–	4
No. 17 New Hampshire ^	6	–	2	8	–	5
No. 8 Richmond ^	5	–	3	10	–	4
Maine	5	–	3	6	–	5
Albany	4	–	4	7	–	4
Stony Brook	4	–	4	5	–	6
William & Mary	3	–	5	5	–	6
Towson	3	–	5	4	–	7
Delaware	2	–	6	4	–	7
Elon	1	–	7	2	–	9
Rhode Island	1	–	7	2	–	9
$ – Conference champion; ^ – FCS playoff participant; Rankings from STATS Poll

The 2016 Maine Black Bears football team represented the University of Maine in the 2016 NCAA Division I FCS football season. They were led by first-year head coach Joe Harasymiak and played their home games at Alfond Stadium. They were a member of the Colonial Athletic Association. They finished the season 6–5, 5–3 in CAA play to finish in a tie for fourth place.

== Schedule ==
Date	Time	Opponent	Site	TV	Result	Attendance
September 1	7:00 pm	at UConn*	Rentschler Field; East Hartford, CT	ESPN3	L 21–24	29,377
September 10	7:00 pm	at Toledo*	Glass Bowl; Toledo, OH	ESPN3	L 3–45	23,439
September 24	12:00 pm	No. 11 James Madison	Alfond Stadium; Orono, ME	ASN	L 20–31	8,736
October 1	3:30 pm	Bryant*	Alfond Stadium; Orono, ME	FCS	W 35–31	7,266
October 8	3:30 pm	at Delaware	Delaware Stadium; Newark, DE	BHAA	W 28–21	18,108
October 15	12:00 pm	No. 17 Albany	Alfond Stadium; Orono, ME	FCS	W 20–16	10,443
October 22	12:00 pm	at Rhode Island	Meade Stadium; Kingston, RI	A10 Network	W 28–21	4,007
October 29	3:30 pm	at William & Mary	Zable Stadium; Williamsburg, VA	TATV	W 35–28	9,124
November 5	12:00 pm	No. 10 Villanova	Alfond Stadium; Orono, ME	FCS	L 7–26	6,790
November 12	2:00 pm	at Stony Brook	Kenneth P. LaValle Stadium; Stony Brook, NY	CSL	W 27–21	5,330
November 19	1:00 pm	New Hampshire	Alfond Stadium; Orono, ME (Battle for the Brice–Cowell Musket)	MAA	L 21–24	6,401
*Non-conference game; Rankings from STATS Poll released prior to the game; All times are in Eastern time

== Game summaries ==
=== UConn ===
	1	2	3	4	Total
Black Bears	7	0	7	7	21
Huskies	0	7	7	10	24

=== Toledo ===
	1	2	3	4	Total
Black Bears	3	0	0	0	3
Rockets	7	10	21	7	45

=== James Madison ===
	1	2	3	4	Total
#11 Dukes	7	3	7	14	31
Black Bears	0	13	7	0	20

=== Bryant ===
	1	2	3	4	Total
Bulldogs	14	7	10	0	31
Black Bears	0	7	21	7	35

=== Delaware ===
	1	2	3	4	Total
Black Bears	0	13	0	15	28
Fightin' Blue Hens	7	7	0	7	21

=== Albany ===
	1	2	3	4	Total
#17 Great Danes	3	5	0	8	16
Black Bears	7	6	7	0	20

=== Rhode Island ===
	1	2	3	4	Total
Black Bears	7	7	7	7	28
Rams	0	7	7	7	21

=== William & Mary ===
	1	2	3	4	Total
Black Bears	13	15	7	0	35
Tribe	0	14	14	0	28

=== Villanova ===
	1	2	3	4	Total
#10 Wildcats	0	10	9	7	26
Black Bears	0	0	7	0	7

=== Stony Brook ===
	1	2	3	4	Total
Black Bears	7	13	7	0	27
Seawolves	0	0	14	7	21

=== New Hampshire ===
	1	2	3	4	Total
Wildcats	7	0	7	10	24
Black Bears	7	7	0	7	21
