= Rich Skrosky =

American football player and coach (born 1964)

Current position
- Title: Senior analyst
- Team: Duke
- Conference: ACC

Biographical details
- Born: October 26, 1964 (age 62); Passaic, New Jersey, U.S.

Playing career
- 1983: Ramapo
- Position: Safety

Coaching career (HC unless noted)
- 1984: St. Peter's Prep HS (NJ) (DB)
- 1985–1987: Lodi HS (NJ) (DC)
- 1988–1989: Rutgers (GA)
- 1990–1991: Ramapo (OC)
- 1992: Ramapo
- 1993–2000: Monmouth (OC/OL)
- 2001–2005: Columbia (OC/OL)
- 2006–2008: Elon (OL)
- 2009–2010: Elon (OC/QB)
- 2011–2013: Ball State (OC/QB)
- 2014–2016: Elon
- 2017–2020: FIU (OC/QB)
- 2022–present: Duke (Senior analyst)

Head coaching record
- Overall: 8–35

Rich Skrosky (born October 26, 1964) is an American college football coach and former player. He is a senior analyst for Duke. He was hired as head football coach at Elon University for the 2014 season. Skrosky served as an assistant coach at Elon under Pete Lembo from 2006 to 2010. Lembo's tenure brought new success to Elon's football program, which made its first FCS playoff appearance in 2009. Lembo was hired as head coach at Ball State University after the 2010 season. Skrosky joined Lembo's staff as offensive coordinator.

== Early career ==
Born in Passaic, New Jersey and raised in Lodi, Skrosky graduated from Lodi High School, where he later served as an assistant head coach of the school's football team. He then worked as a graduate assistant for Rutgers under head coach Dick Anderson.

In 1990, Skrosky was hired as offensive coordinator at Ramapo College, an NCAA Division III school competing in the New Jersey Athletic Conference. In 1992, Skrosky served one season as head football coach at Ramapo. The team finished with a 1–8 record.

Skrosky then served as offensive coordinator and offensive line coach at Monmouth from 1993-2000 and at Columbia from 2001-2005.

From 2009 to 2010, Skrosky was an offensive coordinator of the Elon Phoenix's football division and led its Southern Conference to the sixth place in the 2009 NCAA Division I FCS football season with 291.50 passing-yards-per-game. During the 2010 NCAA Division I FCS football season he led the Phoenix to become the eighth ranked team in the nation with 435.18 yards-per-game, averaging at the 31.9 points-per-game and holding 322.36 yards-per-outing cap.

From 2011 to 2013, Skrosky was an offensive coordinator for the Ball State University's Ball State Cardinals.

On December 12, 2013, Skrosky was hired as the head coach at Elon, which he would serve from 2014 to 2016. In the third week of the 2016 season, the Phoenix upset 8th-ranked William and Mary 27–10, their first win against a Top 10 opponent since 2007.

In 2017, Skrosky had joined Butch Davis's FIU Panthers as an offensive coordinator. He was fired after four seasons on December 23, 2020.

In January 2022, Skrosky joined Mike Elko's Duke Blue Devils as a Senior Analyst.

== Head coaching record ==
Year	Team	Overall	Conference	Standing	Bowl/playoffs
Ramapo College (New Jersey Athletic Conference) (1992)
1992	Ramapo	1–8	1–5	6th	
Ramapo:		1–8	1–5		
Elon Phoenix (Colonial Athletic Association) (2014–2016)
2014	Elon	1–11	0–8	12th	
2015	Elon	4–7	3–5	T–7th	
2016	Elon	2–9	1–7	T–11th	
Elon:		7–27	4–20		
Total:		8–35			
