= 2016 Elon Phoenix football team =

American college football season

2016 Elon Phoenix football
- Conference: Colonial Athletic Association
- Record: 2–9 (1–7 CAA)
- Head coach: Rich Skrosky (3rd season)
- Offensive coordinator: Damian Wroblewski (3rd season)
- Defensive coordinator: Jerry Petercuskie (3rd season)
- Home stadium: Rhodes Stadium

2016 Colonial Athletic Association football standings
	Conf.			Overall
Team	W		L	W		L
No. 1 James Madison $^	8	–	0	14	–	1
No. 11 Villanova ^	6	–	2	9	–	4
No. 17 New Hampshire ^	6	–	2	8	–	5
No. 8 Richmond ^	5	–	3	10	–	4
Maine	5	–	3	6	–	5
Albany	4	–	4	7	–	4
Stony Brook	4	–	4	5	–	6
William & Mary	3	–	5	5	–	6
Towson	3	–	5	4	–	7
Delaware	2	–	6	4	–	7
Elon	1	–	7	2	–	9
Rhode Island	1	–	7	2	–	9
$ – Conference champion; ^ – FCS playoff participant; Rankings from STATS Poll

The 2016 Elon Phoenix football team represented Elon University in the 2016 NCAA Division I FCS football season. They were led by third-year head coach Rich Skrosky and played their home games at Rhodes Stadium. They were members of the Colonial Athletic Association (CAA). They finished the season 2–9, 1–7 in CAA play to finish in a tie for 11th place.

On December 20, 2016 Rich Skrosky resigned after accepting a coaching job at FIU. He finished at Elon with a record of 7–27.

== Schedule ==
Date	Time	Opponent	Site	TV	Result	Attendance
September 3	3:30 pm	Gardner–Webb*	Rhodes Stadium; Elon, NC	ASN	L 6–31	11,250
September 10	6:00 pm	at Charlotte*	Jerry Richardson Stadium; Charlotte, NC	CUSA.tv	L 14–47	15,807
September 17	7:00 pm	Fayetteville State*	Rhodes Stadium; Elon, NC	PAA	W 26–3	6,588
September 24	7:00 pm	at No. 8 William & Mary	Zable Stadium; Williamsburg, VA	CSN	W 27–10	10,021
October 1	3:30 pm	No. 17 Villanova	Rhodes Stadium; Elon, NC	PAA	L 7–42	10,424
October 7	7:00 pm	New Hampshire	Rhodes Stadium; Elon, NC	PAA	L 10–13	4,416
October 22	3:30 pm	No. 6 Richmond^{†}	Rhodes Stadium; Elon, NC	PAA	L 7–35	8,178
October 29	12:00 pm	at Albany	Bob Ford Field at Tom & Mary Casey Stadium; Albany, NY	ASN	L 3–27	3,916
November 5	2:00 pm	at Towson	Johnny Unitas Stadium; Towson, MD	TSN	L 6–23	4,009
November 12	1:30 pm	Rhode Island	Rhodes Stadium; Elon, NC	PAA	L 14–44	6,236
November 19	1:30 pm	at No. 6 James Madison	Bridgeforth Stadium; Harrisonburg, VA	MadiZone	L 14–63	16,184
*Non-conference game; ^{†}Homecoming; Rankings from STATS Poll released prior to the game; All times are in Eastern time

== Game summaries ==
=== Gardner–Webb ===
	1	2	3	4	Total
Runnin' Bulldogs	0	3	14	14	31
Phoenix	0	3	3	0	6

=== At Charlotte ===
	1	2	3	4	Total
Phoenix	7	0	0	7	14
49ers	0	20	13	14	47

=== Fayetteville State ===
	1	2	3	4	Total
Broncos	3	0	0	0	3
Phoenix	7	6	7	6	26

=== At William & Mary ===
	1	2	3	4	Total
Phoenix	3	14	7	3	27
#8 Tribe	0	3	7	0	10

=== Villanova ===
	1	2	3	4	Total
#17 Wildcats	14	21	7	0	42
Phoenix	0	0	0	7	7

=== New Hampshire ===
	1	2	3	4	Total
Wildcats	7	0	0	6	13
Phoenix	0	3	7	0	10

=== Richmond ===
	1	2	3	4	Total
#6 Spiders	3	3	22	7	35
Phoenix	0	0	0	7	7

=== At Albany ===
	1	2	3	4	Total
Phoenix	0	3	0	0	3
Great Danes	3	7	7	10	27

=== At Towson ===
	1	2	3	4	Total
Phoenix	0	3	3	0	6
Tigers	10	3	0	10	23

=== Rhode Island ===
	1	2	3	4	Total
Rams	3	10	10	21	44
Phoenix	7	0	0	7	14

=== At James Madison ===
	1	2	3	4	Total
Phoenix	0	7	7	0	14
#6 Dukes	17	10	15	21	63
