= 2016 Stony Brook Seawolves football team =

American college football season

2016 Stony Brook Seawolves football
- Conference: Colonial Athletic Association
- Record: 5–6 (4–4 CAA)
- Head coach: Chuck Priore (11th season)
- Offensive coordinator: Jeff Behrman (11th season)
- Defensive coordinator: Lyle Hemphill (4th season)
- Home stadium: Kenneth P. LaValle Stadium

2016 Colonial Athletic Association football standings
	Conf.			Overall
Team	W		L	W		L
No. 1 James Madison $^	8	–	0	14	–	1
No. 11 Villanova ^	6	–	2	9	–	4
No. 17 New Hampshire ^	6	–	2	8	–	5
No. 8 Richmond ^	5	–	3	10	–	4
Maine	5	–	3	6	–	5
Albany	4	–	4	7	–	4
Stony Brook	4	–	4	5	–	6
William & Mary	3	–	5	5	–	6
Towson	3	–	5	4	–	7
Delaware	2	–	6	4	–	7
Elon	1	–	7	2	–	9
Rhode Island	1	–	7	2	–	9
$ – Conference champion; ^ – FCS playoff participant; Rankings from STATS Poll

The 2016 Stony Brook Seawolves football team represented Stony Brook University in the 2016 NCAA Division I FCS football season. The Seawolves competed as fourth year members of the Colonial Athletic Association with Chuck Priore as the head coach for his eleventh season. They played their home games at Kenneth P. LaValle Stadium in Stony Brook, New York. They finished the season 5–6, 4–4 in CAA play to finish in a tie for sixth place.

== Schedule ==
Date	Time	Opponent	Rank	Site	TV	Result	Attendance
September 1	7:00 pm	No. 19 North Dakota*		Kenneth P. LaValle Stadium; Stony Brook, NY		W 13–9	6,153
September 10	1:00 pm	at Temple*		Lincoln Financial Field; Philadelphia, PA	ESPN3	L 0–38	22,296
September 17	12:00 pm	No. 2 Richmond		Kenneth P. LaValle Stadium; Stony Brook, NY	ASN	W 42–14	4,450
September 24	6:00 pm	Sacred Heart*	No. 20	Kenneth P. LaValle Stadium; Stony Brook, NY	SHU Live	L 10–38	7,833
October 8	7:00 pm	at Towson		Johnny Unitas Stadium; Towson, MD	CSN	W 27–20	7,059
October 15	4:00 pm	Rhode Island		Kenneth P. LaValle Stadium; Stony Brook, NY	CSL	W 14–3	12,221
October 22	3:30 pm	at Delaware	No. 24	Delaware Stadium; Newark, DE	BHAA	W 28–3	12,972
October 29	12:00 pm	at New Hampshire	No. 22	Wildcat Stadium; Durham, NH	UNHAthletics	L 14–43	5,029
November 5	2:00 pm	William & Mary	No. 25	Kenneth P. LaValle Stadium; Stony Brook, NY	CSL	L 9–14	5,732
November 12	2:00 pm	Maine		Kenneth P. LaValle Stadium; Stony Brook, NY	CSL	L 21–27	5,330
November 19	1:00 pm	at Albany		Bob Ford Field at Tom & Mary Casey Stadium; Albany, NY (Rivalry)	DZ	L 6–13	3,836
*Non-conference game; Rankings from STATS Poll released prior to the game; All times are in Eastern time

*Source: Schedule

== Game summaries ==
=== North Dakota ===
	1	2	3	4	Total
#19 Fighting Hawks	0	7	2	0	9
Seawolves	0	7	0	6	13

=== At Temple ===
	1	2	3	4	Total
Seawolves	0	0	0	0	0
Owls	14	14	10	0	38

=== Richmond ===
	1	2	3	4	Total
#2 Spiders	7	7	0	0	14
Seawolves	14	7	14	7	42

=== Sacred Heart ===
	1	2	3	4	Total
Pioneers	7	3	14	14	38
#20 Seawolves	7	3	0	0	10

=== At Towson ===
	1	2	3	4	Total
Seawolves	7	0	7	13	27
Tigers	7	10	0	3	20

=== Rhode Island ===
	1	2	3	4	Total
Rams	3	0	0	0	3
Seawolves	0	0	0	14	14

=== At Delaware ===
	1	2	3	4	Total
#24 Seawolves	0	7	7	14	28
Fightin' Blue Hens	0	3	0	0	3

=== At New Hampshire ===
	1	2	3	4	Total
#22 Seawolves	7	0	7	0	14
Wildcats	15	0	21	7	43

=== William & Mary ===
	1	2	3	4	Total
Tribe	0	14	0	0	14
#25 Seawolves	7	0	0	2	9

=== Maine ===
	1	2	3	4	Total
Black Bears	7	13	7	0	27
Seawolves	0	0	14	7	21

=== At Albany ===
	1	2	3	4	Total
Seawolves	0	3	0	3	6
Great Danes	0	3	10	0	13

== Ranking movements ==
Ranking movements Legend: ██ Increase in ranking ██ Decrease in ranking — = Not ranked RV = Received votes
	Week													
Poll	Pre	1	2	3	4	5	6	7	8	9	10	11	12	Final
STATS FCS	RV	RV	RV	20	RV	RV	RV	24	22	25	RV	RV	RV	
Coaches	—	RV	RV	24	RV	RV	RV	22	20	25	—	—	—	
