= 2016 Delaware Fightin' Blue Hens football team =

American college football season

2016 Delaware Fightin' Blue Hens football
- Conference: Colonial Athletic Association
- Record: 4–7 (2–6 CAA)
- Head coach: Dave Brock (4th season; first 6 games); Dennis Dottin-Carter (interim, final 5 games)
- Offensive coordinator: Sean Devine (4th season)
- Offensive scheme: Multiple
- Co-defensive coordinators: Dennis Dottin-Carter (3rd season); Tim Weaver (4th season)
- Base defense: 4–3
- Home stadium: Delaware Stadium

2016 Colonial Athletic Association football standings
	Conf.			Overall
Team	W		L	W		L
No. 1 James Madison $^	8	–	0	14	–	1
No. 11 Villanova ^	6	–	2	9	–	4
No. 17 New Hampshire ^	6	–	2	8	–	5
No. 8 Richmond ^	5	–	3	10	–	4
Maine	5	–	3	6	–	5
Albany	4	–	4	7	–	4
Stony Brook	4	–	4	5	–	6
William & Mary	3	–	5	5	–	6
Towson	3	–	5	4	–	7
Delaware	2	–	6	4	–	7
Elon	1	–	7	2	–	9
Rhode Island	1	–	7	2	–	9
$ – Conference champion; ^ – FCS playoff participant; Rankings from STATS Poll

The 2016 Delaware Fightin' Blue Hens football team represented the University of Delaware as a member of the Colonial Athletic Association (CAA) during the 2016 NCAA Division I FCS football season. The Fightin' Blue Hens were led by fourth-year head coach Dave Brock for the first six games of the season, before he was fired on October 16, following a loss to William & Mary. Co-defensive coordinator Dennis Dottin-Carter was named interim head coach for the remainder of the season. Delaware finished the season with an overall record of 4–7 and a mark of 2–6 in conference play, placing tenth in the CAA. The team played home games at Delaware Stadium in Newark, Delaware.

== Schedule ==
Date	Time	Opponent	Site	TV	Result	Attendance
September 1	7:00 pm	Delaware State*	Delaware Stadium; Newark, DE (Route 1 Rivalry)	BHAA	W 56–14	17,835
September 10	6:00 pm	at Lafayette*	Fisher Stadium; Easton, PA	WBPH-TV, BHAA	W 24–6	6,828
September 17	6:30 pm	at Wake Forest*	BB&T Field; Winston-Salem, NC	ESPN3	L 21–38	25,972
October 1	1:30 pm	at No. 7 James Madison	Bridgeforth Stadium; Harrisonburg, VA (rivalry)	MadiZone	L 20–43	25,236
October 8	3:30 pm	Maine	Delaware Stadium; Newark, DE	BHAA	L 21–28	18,108
October 15	3:30 pm	at William & Mary	Zable Stadium; Williamsburg, VA (rivalry)	TATV	L 17–24	11,713
October 22	1:00 pm	No. 24 Stony Brook	Delaware Stadium; Newark, DE	BHAA	L 3–28	12,972
October 29	3:30 pm	Towson^{†}	Delaware Stadium; Newark, DE	CSN	W 20–6	17,488
November 5	1:00 pm	at Albany	Bob Ford Field at Tom & Mary Casey Stadium; Albany, NY	DZ	W 33–17	4,412
November 12	3:30 pm	at No. 8 Richmond	E. Claiborne Robins Stadium; Richmond, VA	CSN	L 17–31	8,700
November 19	3:30 pm	No. 13 Villanova	Delaware Stadium; Newark, DE (Battle of the Blue)	CSN	L 10–41	15,987
*Non-conference game; ^{†}Homecoming; Rankings from STATS Poll released prior to the game; All times are in Eastern time

== Game summaries ==
=== Delaware State ===
	1	2	3	4	Total
Hornets	0	0	7	7	14
Fightin' Blue Hens	14	14	21	7	56

- Most points in a regulation game since October 27, 2007 (59–52 win at Navy)
- Most points in a season-opening game since 1993 (62–21 win vs. Lehigh)
- Most rushing yards (395) since September 23, 2000 (84–0 win vs. West Chester; 443 yards)
- Most total yards (487) since October 26, 2013 (35–13 win at Rhode Island; 500 yards)
- Delaware's 300th win at Delaware Stadium (300–100–4 all time)

=== Lafayette ===
	1	2	3	4	Total
Fightin' Blue Hens	3	0	7	14	24
Leopards	3	0	3	0	6

=== Wake Forest ===
	1	2	3	4	Total
Fightin' Blue Hens	7	7	0	7	21
Demon Deacons	10	14	14	0	38

=== James Madison ===
	1	2	3	4	Total
Fightin' Blue Hens	0	7	0	13	20
#7 Dukes	7	19	7	10	43

- James Madison is coming off of a share of the CAA Championship in 2015, and qualified for the FCS Playoffs.

=== Maine ===
	1	2	3	4	Total
Black Bears	0	13	0	15	28
Fightin' Blue Hens	7	7	0	7	21

=== William & Mary ===
	1	2	3	4	Total
Fightin' Blue Hens	7	0	7	3	17
Tribe	3	0	0	21	24

=== Stony Brook ===
	1	2	3	4	Total
#24 Seawolves	0	7	7	14	28
Fightin' Blue Hens	0	3	0	0	3

=== Towson ===
	1	2	3	4	Total
Tigers	0	3	3	0	6
Fightin' Blue Hens	0	10	3	7	20

=== Albany ===
	1	2	3	4	Total
Fightin' Blue Hens	0	14	14	5	33
Great Danes	10	7	0	0	17

=== Richmond ===
	1	2	3	4	Total
Fightin' Blue Hens	7	0	3	7	17
#8 Spiders	7	10	0	14	31

=== Villanova ===
	1	2	3	4	Total
#13 Wildcats	7	20	7	7	41
Fightin' Blue Hens	0	10	0	0	10
