= 2016 Albany Great Danes football team =

American college football season

2016 Albany Great Danes football
- Conference: Colonial Athletic Association
- Record: 7–4 (4–4 CAA)
- Head coach: Greg Gattuso (3rd season)
- Offensive coordinator: Joe Bernard (3rd season)
- Defensive coordinator: Bob Benson (3rd season)
- Home stadium: Bob Ford Field at Tom & Mary Casey Stadium

2016 Colonial Athletic Association football standings
| | Conf. | | | Overall |
| Team | W | | L | W | | L |
|---|---|---|---|---|---|---|
| No. 1 James Madison $^ | 8 | – | 0 | 14 | – | 1 |
| No. 11 Villanova ^ | 6 | – | 2 | 9 | – | 4 |
| No. 17 New Hampshire ^ | 6 | – | 2 | 8 | – | 5 |
| No. 8 Richmond ^ | 5 | – | 3 | 10 | – | 4 |
| Maine | 5 | – | 3 | 6 | – | 5 |
| Albany | 4 | – | 4 | 7 | – | 4 |
| Stony Brook | 4 | – | 4 | 5 | – | 6 |
| William & Mary | 3 | – | 5 | 5 | – | 6 |
| Towson | 3 | – | 5 | 4 | – | 7 |
| Delaware | 2 | – | 6 | 4 | – | 7 |
| Elon | 1 | – | 7 | 2 | – | 9 |
| Rhode Island | 1 | – | 7 | 2 | – | 9 |
$ – Conference champion; ^ – FCS playoff participant; Rankings from STATS Poll

The 2016 Albany Great Danes football team represented the University at Albany, SUNY as a member of the Colonial Athletic Association (CAA) during the 2016 NCAA Division I FCS football season. Led by third-year head coach Greg Gattuso, the Great Danes compiled an overall record of 7–4 with a mark of 4–4 in conference play, tying for sixth place in the CAA. The team played home games at Bob Ford Field at Tom & Mary Casey Stadium in Albany, New York.

== Schedule ==
| Date | Time | Opponent | Rank | Site | TV | Result | Attendance |
|---|---|---|---|---|---|---|---|
| September 2 | 7:00 pm | at Buffalo* | | University at Buffalo Stadium; Amherst, NY | ESPN3 | W 22–16 | 18,657 |
| September 10 | 1:00 pm | at Rhode Island | | Meade Stadium; Kingston, RI | A10 Network | W 35–7 | 4,511 |
| September 17 | 7:00 pm | Holy Cross* | No. 25 | Bob Ford Field at Tom & Mary Casey Stadium; Albany, NY | DZ | W 45–28 | 8,040 |
| September 24 | 7:00 pm | Saint Francis (PA)* | No. 22 | Bob Ford Field at Tom & Mary Casey Stadium; Albany, NY | DZ | W 20–9 | 6,309 |
| October 8 | 3:30 pm | No. 6 Richmond^{†} | No. 16 | Bob Ford Field at Tom & Mary Casey Stadium; Albany, NY | DZ | L 30–36 ^{3OT} | 9,052 |
| October 15 | 12:00 pm | at Maine | No. 17 | Alfond Stadium; Orono, ME | FCS | L 16–20 | 10,443 |
| October 22 | 3:30 pm | at No. 16 Villanova | No. 23 | Villanova Stadium; Villanova, PA | NNAA | L 13–24 | 5,109 |
| October 29 | 12:00 pm | Elon | | Bob Ford Field at Tom & Mary Casey Stadium; Albany, NY | ASN | W 27–3 | 3,916 |
| November 5 | 1:00 pm | Delaware | | Bob Ford Field at Tom & Mary Casey Stadium; Albany, NY | DZ | L 17–33 | 4,412 |
| November 12 | 12:00 pm | at No. 21 New Hampshire | | Wildcat Stadium; Durham, NH | UNHAthletics | W 36–25 | 7,012 |
| November 19 | 1:00 pm | Stony Brook | | Bob Ford Field at Tom & Mary Casey Stadium; Albany, NY (rivalry) | DZ | W 13–6 | 3,836 |
*Non-conference game; ^{†}Homecoming; Rankings from STATS Poll released prior to the game; All times are in Eastern time

== Game summaries ==
=== At Buffalo ===
| | 1 | 2 | 3 | 4 | Total |
|---|---|---|---|---|---|
| Great Danes | 7 | 7 | 0 | 8 | 22 |
| Bulls | 0 | 13 | 3 | 0 | 16 |

=== At Rhode Island ===
| | 1 | 2 | 3 | 4 | Total |
|---|---|---|---|---|---|
| Great Danes | 7 | 7 | 7 | 14 | 35 |
| Rams | 0 | 7 | 0 | 0 | 7 |

=== Holy Cross ===
| | 1 | 2 | 3 | 4 | Total |
|---|---|---|---|---|---|
| Crusaders | 7 | 0 | 7 | 14 | 28 |
| #25 Great Danes | 0 | 28 | 3 | 14 | 45 |

=== Saint Francis (PA) ===
| | 1 | 2 | 3 | 4 | Total |
|---|---|---|---|---|---|
| Red Flash | 0 | 9 | 0 | 0 | 9 |
| #22 Great Danes | 0 | 0 | 3 | 17 | 20 |

=== Richmond ===
| | 1 | 2 | 3 | 4 | OT | 2OT | 3OT | Total |
|---|---|---|---|---|---|---|---|---|
| #6 Spiders | 3 | 7 | 3 | 7 | 3 | 7 | 6 | 36 |
| #16 Great Danes | 7 | 3 | 3 | 7 | 3 | 7 | 0 | 30 |

=== At Maine ===
| | 1 | 2 | 3 | 4 | Total |
|---|---|---|---|---|---|
| #17 Great Danes | 3 | 5 | 0 | 8 | 16 |
| Black Bears | 7 | 6 | 7 | 0 | 20 |

=== At Villanova ===
| | 1 | 2 | 3 | 4 | Total |
|---|---|---|---|---|---|
| #23 Great Danes | 0 | 0 | 0 | 13 | 13 |
| #17 Wildcats | 7 | 7 | 10 | 0 | 24 |

=== Elon ===
| | 1 | 2 | 3 | 4 | Total |
|---|---|---|---|---|---|
| Phoenix | 0 | 3 | 0 | 0 | 3 |
| Great Danes | 3 | 7 | 7 | 10 | 27 |

=== Delaware ===
| | 1 | 2 | 3 | 4 | Total |
|---|---|---|---|---|---|
| Fightin' Blue Hens | 0 | 14 | 14 | 5 | 33 |
| Great Danes | 10 | 7 | 0 | 0 | 17 |

=== At New Hampshire ===
| | 1 | 2 | 3 | 4 | Total |
|---|---|---|---|---|---|
| Great Danes | 0 | 7 | 15 | 14 | 36 |
| #21 Wildcats | 8 | 14 | 3 | 0 | 25 |

=== Stony Brook ===
| | 1 | 2 | 3 | 4 | Total |
|---|---|---|---|---|---|
| Seawolves | 0 | 3 | 0 | 3 | 6 |
| Great Danes | 0 | 3 | 10 | 0 | 13 |

== Ranking movements ==
Ranking movements Legend: ██ Increase in ranking ██ Decrease in ranking — = Not ranked RV = Received votes
| | Week | | | | | | | | | | | | | |
| Poll | Pre | 1 | 2 | 3 | 4 | 5 | 6 | 7 | 8 | 9 | 10 | 11 | 12 | Final |
|---|---|---|---|---|---|---|---|---|---|---|---|---|---|---|
| STATS FCS | — | RV | 25 | 22 | 21 | 16 | 17 | 23 | RV | RV | RV | RV | RV | |
| Coaches | — | RV | 25 | 23 | 21 | 17 | 19 | 24 | RV | RV | — | — | RV | |
