= 2016 Villanova Wildcats football team =

American college football season

2016 Villanova Wildcats football

FCS Playoffs Second Round, L 7–10 vs. South Dakota State
- Conference: Colonial Athletic Association

Ranking
- STATS: No. 11
- FCS Coaches: No. 13
- Record: 9–4 (6–2 CAA)
- Head coach: Andy Talley (32nd season)
- Offensive coordinator: Sam Venuto (18th season)
- Offensive scheme: Multiple spread
- Defensive coordinator: Billy Crocker (5th season)
- Base defense: 3–3–5
- Home stadium: Villanova Stadium

2016 Colonial Athletic Association football standings
	Conf.			Overall
Team	W		L	W		L
No. 1 James Madison $^	8	–	0	14	–	1
No. 11 Villanova ^	6	–	2	9	–	4
No. 17 New Hampshire ^	6	–	2	8	–	5
No. 8 Richmond ^	5	–	3	10	–	4
Maine	5	–	3	6	–	5
Albany	4	–	4	7	–	4
Stony Brook	4	–	4	5	–	6
William & Mary	3	–	5	5	–	6
Towson	3	–	5	4	–	7
Delaware	2	–	6	4	–	7
Elon	1	–	7	2	–	9
Rhode Island	1	–	7	2	–	9
$ – Conference champion; ^ – FCS playoff participant; Rankings from STATS Poll

The 2016 Villanova Wildcats football team represented Villanova University in the 2016 NCAA Division I FCS football season. They were led by 32nd-year head coach Andy Talley and played their home games at Villanova Stadium. They were a member of the Colonial Athletic Association. They finished the season 9–4, 6–2 in CAA play to finish in a tie for second place. They received an at-large bid to the FCS Playoffs where they defeated St. Francis (PA) in the first round before losing in the second round to South Dakota State. The 2016 season is Talley's final season as the Wildcats' head coach.

== Schedule ==
Date	Time	Opponent	Rank	Site	TV	Result	Attendance
September 3	1:30 pm	at Pittsburgh*	No. 23	Heinz Field; Pittsburgh, PA	ESPN3	L 7–28	50,149
September 10	6:00 pm	Lehigh*	No. 22	Villanova Stadium; Villanova, PA	NNAA	W 26–21	6,419
September 17	3:30 pm	Towson	No. 21	Villanova Stadium; Villanova, PA	CSN	W 40–21	9,025
September 24	6:00 pm	at Lafayette*	No. 19	Fisher Stadium; Easton, PA	WBPH-TV	W 31–14	7,441
October 1	3:30 pm	at Elon	No. 17	Rhodes Stadium; Elon, NC	NNAA	W 42–7	10,424
October 8	12:00 pm	Rhode Island	No. 14	Villanova Stadium; Villanova, PA	ASN	W 35–0	4,105
October 15	3:30 pm	at No. 6 Richmond	No. 13	E. Claiborne Robins Stadium; Richmond, VA	CSN	L 0–23	8,700
October 22	3:30 pm	No. 23 Albany^{†}	No. 16	Villanova Stadium; Villanova, PA	NNAA	W 24–13	5,109
November 5	12:00 pm	at Maine	No. 10	Alfond Stadium; Orono, ME	FCS	W 26–7	6,790
November 12	1:00 pm	No. 6 James Madison	No. 9	Villanova Stadium; Villanova, PA	NNAA	L 7–20	6,109
November 19	3:30 pm	at Delaware	No. 13	Delaware Stadium; Newark, DE (Battle of the Blue)	CSN	W 41–10	15,987
November 26	2:00 pm	St. Francis (PA)*	No. 9	Villanova Stadium; Villanova, PA (NCAA Division I First Round)	ESPN3	W 31–21	2,059
December 3	3:00 pm	at No. 7 South Dakota State*	No. 9	Dana J. Dykhouse Stadium; Brookings, SD (NCAA Division I Second Round)	ESPN3	L 7–10	6,154
*Non-conference game; ^{†}Homecoming; Rankings from STATS Poll released prior to the game; All times are in Eastern time

== Game summaries ==
=== At Pittsburgh ===
	1	2	3	4	Total
#23 Wildcats	0	0	7	0	7
Panthers	0	14	7	7	28

=== Lehigh ===
	1	2	3	4	Total
Mountain Hawks	0	14	0	7	21
#22 Wildcats	6	0	14	6	26

=== Towson ===
	1	2	3	4	Total
Tigers	7	7	0	7	21
#21 Wildcats	7	19	0	14	40

=== At Lafayette ===
	1	2	3	4	Total
#19 Wildcats	7	10	14	0	31
Leopards	0	7	7	0	14

=== At Elon ===
	1	2	3	4	Total
#17 Wildcats	14	21	7	0	42
Phoenix	0	0	0	7	7

=== Rhode Island ===
	1	2	3	4	Total
Rams	0	0	0	0	0
#14 Wildcats	21	7	7	0	35

=== At Richmond ===
	1	2	3	4	Total
#13 Wildcats	0	0	0	0	0
#6 Spiders	7	3	3	10	23

=== Albany ===
	1	2	3	4	Total
#23 Great Danes	0	0	0	13	13
#16 Wildcats	7	7	10	0	24

=== At Maine ===
	1	2	3	4	Total
#10 Wildcats	0	10	9	7	26
Black Bears	0	0	7	0	7

=== James Madison ===
	1	2	3	4	Total
#6 Dukes	7	0	3	10	20
#9 Wildcats	0	7	0	0	7

=== At Delaware ===
	1	2	3	4	Total
#13 Wildcats	7	20	7	7	41
Fightin' Blue Hens	0	10	0	0	10

== FCS Playoffs ==
=== First Round–Saint Francis (PA) ===
	1	2	3	4	Total
Red Flash	7	0	0	14	21
#9 Wildcats	17	14	0	0	31

=== Second Round–South Dakota State ===
	1	2	3	4	Total
#9 Wildcats	0	7	0	0	7
#7 Jackrabbits	7	0	0	3	10

== Ranking movements ==
Ranking movements Legend: ██ Increase in ranking ██ Decrease in ranking
	Week													
Poll	Pre	1	2	3	4	5	6	7	8	9	10	11	12	Final
STATS FCS	23	22	21	19	17	14	13	16	11	10	9	13	9	11
Coaches	22	19	18	15	14	12	11	17	13	12	11	15	11	13
