= 2016 Richmond Spiders football team =

American college football season

2016 Richmond Spiders football

FCS Playoffs Quarterfinals, L 0–38 vs. Eastern Washington
- Conference: Colonial Athletic Association

Ranking
- STATS: No. 8
- FCS Coaches: No. 8
- Record: 10–4 (5–3 CAA)
- Head coach: Danny Rocco (5th season)
- Offensive coordinator: John Garrett (1st season)
- Defensive coordinator: Chris Cosh (1st season)
- Home stadium: E. Claiborne Robins Stadium

2016 Colonial Athletic Association football standings
	Conf.			Overall
Team	W		L	W		L
No. 1 James Madison $^	8	–	0	14	–	1
No. 11 Villanova ^	6	–	2	9	–	4
No. 17 New Hampshire ^	6	–	2	8	–	5
No. 8 Richmond ^	5	–	3	10	–	4
Maine	5	–	3	6	–	5
Albany	4	–	4	7	–	4
Stony Brook	4	–	4	5	–	6
William & Mary	3	–	5	5	–	6
Towson	3	–	5	4	–	7
Delaware	2	–	6	4	–	7
Elon	1	–	7	2	–	9
Rhode Island	1	–	7	2	–	9
$ – Conference champion; ^ – FCS playoff participant; Rankings from STATS Poll

The 2016 Richmond Spiders football team represented the University of Richmond in the 2016 NCAA Division I FCS football season. They were led by fifth-year head coach Danny Rocco and played their home games at E. Claiborne Robins Stadium. The Spiders were a member of the Colonial Athletic Association. They finished the season 10–4, 5–3 in CAA play to finish in a tie for fourth place. They received an at-large bid to the FCS Playoffs where they defeated North Carolina A&T and North Dakota in the first and second round before losing in the quarterfinals to Eastern Washington.

== Schedule ==
Date	Time	Opponent	Rank	Site	TV	Result	Attendance
September 3	3:30 pm	at Virginia*	No. 4	Scott Stadium; Charlottesville, VA	ESPN3	W 37–20	49,270
September 10	6:00 pm	Norfolk State*	No. 2	Robins Stadium; Richmond, VA	CSN	W 34–0	8,700
September 17	noon	at Stony Brook	No. 2	Kenneth P. LaValle Stadium; Stony Brook, NY	ASN	L 14–42	4,450
September 24	3:30 pm	No. 23 Colgate*	No. 7	Robins Stadium; Richmond, VA	CSN MA+	W 38–31	8,700
October 1	3:30 pm	Towson	No. 6	Robins Stadium; Richmond, VA	CSN	W 31–28	8,700
October 8	3:30 pm	at No. 16 Albany	No. 6	Bob Ford Field at Tom & Mary Casey Stadium; Albany, NY	DZ	W 36–30 ^{3OT}	9,052
October 15	3:30 pm	No. 13 Villanova^{†}	No. 6	Robins Stadium; Richmond, VA	CSN	W 23–0	8,700
October 22	3:30 pm	at Elon	No. 6	Rhodes Stadium; Elon, NC	PAA	W 35–7	8,178
November 5	3:30 pm	No. 7 James Madison	No. 6	Robins Stadium; Richmond, VA (rivalry)	CSN	L 43–47	8,700
November 12	3:30 pm	Delaware	No. 8	Robins Stadium; Richmond, VA	CSN	W 31–17	8,700
November 19	noon	at William & Mary	No. 7	Zable Stadium; Williamsburg, VA (Capital Cup)	ASN	L 13–34	9,740
November 26	2:00 pm	No. 17 North Carolina A&T*	No. 12	Robins Stadium; Richmond, VA (FCS Playoffs First Round)	ESPN3	W 39–10	3,281
December 3	6:00 pm	at No. 8 North Dakota*	No. 12	Alerus Center; Grand Forks, ND (FCS Playoffs Second Round)	ESPN3	W 27–24	9,837
December 10	4:00 pm	at No. 3 Eastern Washington*	No. 12	Roos Field; Cheney, WA (FCS Playoffs Quarterfinals)	ESPN3	L 0–38	5,150
*Non-conference game; ^{†}Homecoming; Rankings from STATS Poll released prior to the game; All times are in Eastern time

== Roster ==
2016 Richmond Spiders football team roster
Players
Coaches
Offense

Pos.	#	Name	Class
RB	2	Xavier Goodall	Fr
QB	4	Jake Clise	Jr
QB	5	Kyle Lauletta	Jr
RB	6	Gordon Collins	Jr
QB	7	Kevin Johnson	So
WR	8	Porter Abell	Jr
TE	9	Stephon Jacob	So
WR	10	Caleb Drake	So
TE	11	Garrett Hudson	Jr
WR	12	Brian Brown	Sr
QB	12	Joe Mancuso	Fr
QB	14	David Broadus	Sr
QB	16	Reid Chenault	Fr
WR	17	Jarmal Bevels	So
WR	18	Dejon Brissett	So
RB	20	Deontez Thompson
WR	21	Adam Sahd	Jr
QB	22	Andrew Tsangeos	Fr
QB	26	Jason Gastrock	Fr
RB	27	Jay Palmer
FB	30	James Pavik	Sr
RB	38	Ganon Hingst	So
RB	45	Justin Hayes	Fr
FB	49	Ben Stapleton	Fr
OL	50	John Yarbrough	So
OL	53	Nick Velardo	Sr
OL	54	Jeffrey Phipps
OL	55	Nicholas Vergos	Sr
OL	58	Thomas Evans	Sr
OL	60	Marius Young	Jr
OL	65	Tyler Cole
OL	66	Alex Light	Jr
OL	70	Grant Dixon
OL	74	Adam Samee	Fr
OL	75	Patrick Kliebert	Jr
OL	76	Logan Blake	Fr
OL	77	Seyoum Settepani	Fr
OL	78	Blane Markham	So
OL	79	Tazle Sumpter	Fr
WR	81	Will McCombs	Sr
WR	82	Tyler Wilkins	So
WR	83	Jordan Cannady	Fr
TE	84	Nick Holloway	Jr
WR	85	Gershom Ejoni
WR	86	Michael Horan	Fr
WR	87	Dashon Tibbs	Jr
TE	88	Will Geraghty	So
TE	89	Matt Sullivan	Fr

Defense

Pos.	#	Name	Class
DB	1	Jarriel Jordan	Jr
DB	3	Tafon Mainsah	Jr
DB	4	Micah Keels	So
DB	8	Lemond Johnson	Jr
DL	9	Darius Reynolds	Fr
DB	13	David Jones	Sr
DB	15	Brendan Coniker	Jr
DB	19	Charles Mack	Sr
LB	22	Dale Matthews Jr.	So
LB	23	Selton Hodge	Fr
DB, RB	24	Devin Campbell	Fr
LB	24	David Norris	So
DB	25	Gabe Thomas	Fr
LB	26	Trey Moore	Jr
DB	28	Jevaris Little	Sr
LB	29	Justin Rubin	So
DB	31	Joshua Anderson
DL	32	Brandon Waller	Jr
DB	33	Duncan Rogers
DB	34	Jacob Roberson
DB	35	Trent Williams	Fr
LB	36	Maurice Jackson	Fr
LB	37	T. J. Dunn	Fr
DL	40	Chad Wiggins	So
LB	41	Kieran Gregory	Sr
LB	43	Madison Day	Sr
LB	46	Omar Howard	Sr
LB	47	Tanner Lacey	Fr
DB	48	Daniel Jones	Fr
LB	52	Josh Hurlburt	Fr
LB	57	Paul Padalino
LB	59	Billy Caughell	So
DL	90	Will Ingle
DL	91	Andre Booker	So
DL	92	Colby Ritten	Fr
DL	93	Joe Nelson	Sr
DL	94	Cody Gray
LB	95	Mike Iamunno	Fr
DL	96	DeAnthony Muse	Jr
DL	97	Andrew Clyde	So
DL	98	Winston Craig	Sr
DL	99	Kolby Williams	So

Special teams

Pos.	#	Name	Class
P	16	D. J. Helkowski	Jr
LS	39	Graham Latham	Jr
K	42	Ricky Segers	Sr
K	44	Griffin Trau	So

Head coach

- Danny Rocco

Coordinators/assistant coaches

- John Garrett (offensive coordinator)
- Chris Cosh (defensive coordinator)

Legend

- (C) Team captain
- (S) Suspended
- (I) Ineligible
- Injured
- Redshirt

Roster

== Game summaries ==
=== At Virginia ===
	1	2	3	4	Total
#4 Spiders	6	10	7	14	37
Cavaliers	0	7	0	13	20

=== Norfolk State ===
	1	2	3	4	Total
Spartans	0	0	0	0	0
#2 Spiders	7	7	10	10	34

=== At Stony Brook ===
	1	2	3	4	Total
#2 Spiders	7	7	0	0	14
Seawolves	14	7	14	7	42

=== Colgate ===
	1	2	3	4	Total
#23 Raiders	14	3	0	14	31
#7 Spiders	10	7	14	7	38

=== Towson ===
	1	2	3	4	Total
Tigers	7	14	7	0	28
#6 Spiders	7	14	3	7	31

=== At Albany ===
	1	2	3	4	OT	2OT	3OT	Total
#6 Spiders	3	7	3	7	3	7	6	36
#16 Great Danes	7	3	3	7	3	7	0	30

=== Villanova ===
	1	2	3	4	Total
#13 Wildcats	0	0	0	0	0
#6 Spiders	7	3	3	10	23

=== At Elon ===
	1	2	3	4	Total
#6 Spiders	3	3	22	7	35
Phoenix	0	0	0	7	7

=== James Madison ===
	1	2	3	4	Total
#7 Dukes	14	10	6	17	47
#6 Spiders	10	14	7	12	43

=== Delaware ===
	1	2	3	4	Total
Fightin' Blue Hens	7	0	3	7	17
#8 Spiders	7	10	0	14	31

=== At William & Mary ===
	1	2	3	4	Total
#7 Spiders	7	6	0	0	13
Tribe	3	3	14	14	34

== FCS Playoffs ==
=== First Round – North Carolina A&T ===
	1	2	3	4	Total
#17 Aggies	7	0	3	0	10
#12 Spiders	14	9	9	7	39

=== Second Round – North Dakota ===
	1	2	3	4	Total
#12 Spiders	7	0	7	13	27
#8 Fighting Hawks	7	10	7	0	24

=== Quarterfinals – Eastern Washington ===
	1	2	3	4	Total
#12 Spiders	0	0	0	0	0
#3 Eagles	7	14	10	7	38

== Ranking movements ==
Ranking movements Legend: ██ Increase in ranking ██ Decrease in ranking т = Tied with team above or below ( ) = First-place votes
	Week													
Poll	Pre	1	2	3	4	5	6	7	8	9	10	11	12	Final
STATS FCS	4	2 (21)	2 (18)	7	6	6	6	6	6	6	8	7	12	8
Coaches	4	2 (3)	2 (2)	9	7	7	7	7	6	6	8	7	12-T	8
FCS Playoffs	Not released									7	8	8	Not released	
