= List of NCAA football records =

This is a list of individual National Collegiate Athletic Association (NCAA) American football records, including Division I (FBS, and FCS), II, and III.

== Offense ==
=== Total offense ===
==== Yards per game, season ====
FBS: 474.6 – David Klingler, Houston, 1990, 11 games
FCS: 527.2 – Steve McNair, Alcorn State, 1994, 11 games
Div II: 436.7 – J. J. Harp, Eastern New Mexico, 2009, 10 games
Div III: 465.1 – Justin Peery, Westminster (MO), 1998, 10 games

==== Career yards ====
FBS: 20,114 – Case Keenum, Houston, 2007–11, 19,217 passing, 897 rushing
FCS: 16,823 – Steve McNair, Alcorn State, 1991–94, 14,496 passing, 2,327 rushing
Div II: 17,213 – Tyson Bagent, Shepherd, 2018–22, 17,034 passing, 179 rushing
Div III: 15,985 – Luke Lehnen, North Central, 2021–24, 12,658 passing, 3,327 rushing

==== Season yards ====
FBS: 6,055 – Joe Burrow, LSU, 2019, 5,671 passing, 369 rushing, 16 receiving
FCS: 5,799 – Steve McNair, Alcorn State, 1994, 4,863 passing, 936 rushing
Div II: 5,363 – Chad Friehauf, Colorado Mines, 2004, 4,646 passing, 717 rushing
Div III: 6,189 – Kaleb Blaha, University of Wisconsin River Falls, 2026, 4971 passing, 1218 rushing

==== Single game yards ====
FBS: 819 – Patrick Mahomes, Texas Tech vs. Oklahoma, Oct. 22, 2016, 734 passing, 85 rushing
FCS: 791 – Taylor Heinicke, Old Dominion vs. New Hampshire, Sep. 22, 2012, 730 passing, 61 rushing
Div II: 681 – J. J. Harp, Eastern New Mexico vs. Southeastern Oklahoma, Sep. 12, 2009, 695 passing, −14 rushing
Div III: 719 – Sam Durley, Eureka vs. Knox, Sep. 1, 2012, 736 passing, −17 rushing

==== Most games gaining 400 yards or more, season ====
FBS: 11 – B. J. Symons, Texas Tech, 2003
FCS: 9 – Steve McNair, Alcorn State, 1994
Div II:
Div III:

==== Most games gaining 400 yards or more, career ====
FBS: 21 – Case Keenum, Houston, 2007–11; Graham Harrell, Texas Tech, 2006–08
FCS: 15 – Steve McNair, Alcorn State, 1991–94
Div II:
Div III:

=== Rushing ===
==== Most rushing attempts, career ====
FBS: 1,215 – Steve Bartalo, Colorado State, 1983–86, 4,813 yards
FCS: 1,240 – Jordan Scott, Colgate, 2005–08, 5,621 yards
Div II: 1,271 – Xavier Omon, Northwest Missouri State, 2004–07, 7,073 yards
DIV III: 1,324 – Levell Coppage, Wisconsin–Whitewater, 2008–11, 7,795 yards

==== Most rushing attempts, season ====
FBS: 450 – Kevin Smith, UCF, 2007, 2,567 yards
FCS: 450 – Jamaal Branch, Colgate, 2003, 2,326 yards
Div II: 385 – Joe Gough, Wayne State (MI), 1994, 1,593 yards
Div III: 463 – Dante Washington, Carthage, 2004, 1990 yards

==== Most rushing attempts, game ====
FBS: 58 – Tony Sands, Kansas vs. Missouri, Nov. 23, 1991, 396 yards
FCS: 56 – Arnold Mickens, Butler vs. Valparaiso, Oct. 8, 1994, 295 yards
Div II: 62 – Rahmann Lee, Glenville vs. WVWC, Sep. 10, 2015, 412 yards
Div III: 59 – John Ortiz, King's (PA) vs. Albright, Sep. 24, 2005, 267 yards

==== Highest average rushing attempts per game, season ====
FBS: 39.6 – Ed Marinaro, Cornell University, 1971, 356 carries in 9 games
FCS: 40.9 – Arnold Mickens, Butler University, 1994, 409 carries in 10 games
Div II: 38.6 – Mark Perkins, Hobart College, 1968, 309 carries in 8 games
Div III: 38.0 – Mike Birosak, Dickinson College, 1989, 380 carries in 10 games

==== Most consecutive rushing attempts without losing a fumble, career ====
FBS: 1,005 – Mike Hart, Michigan, 2004–08
FCS:
Div II:
Div III:

==== Most consecutive rushing attempts without losing a fumble, season ====
FBS: 365 – Travis Prentice, Miami (OH), 1998
FCS:
Div II:
Div III:

==== Highest average rushing yards per game, career (minimum 2,500 yards) ====
FBS: 174.6 – Ed Marinaro, Cornell 1971, 4,715 yards in 27 games
FCS: 190.7 – Arnold Mickens, Butler, 1994–95, 3,813 in 20
Div II: 183.4 – Anthony Gray, Western New Mexico, 1997–98, 3,484 in 19
Div III: 187.1 – Tony Sutton, Wooster, 2002–04, 5,613 in 30

==== Highest average rushing yards per game, season ====
FBS: 238.9 – Barry Sanders, Oklahoma State, 1988, 2,628 yards in 11 games
FCS: 225.5 – Arnold Mickens, Butler, 1994, 2,255 yards in 10 games
Div II: 222.0 – Anthony Gray, Western New Mexico, 1997, 2,220 yards in 10 games
Div III: 238.5 – Dante Brown, Marietta, 1996, 2,385 yards in 10 games

==== Most yards rushing, career ====
FBS: 7,125 – Ron Dayne, Wisconsin, 1996–99, 1220 rushes
FCS: 7,590 – Adrian Peterson, Georgia Southern, 1998–2001, 996 rushes
Div II: 7,962 – Danny Woodhead, Chadron State, 2004–07, 1,156 rushes
Div III: 8,074 – Nate Kmic, Mount Union, 2005–08, 1,189 rushes

^{*}Jaleel McLaughlin is the NCAA's all-time leading rusher. His 8,155 yards rushing were split between Div II Notre Dame (OH) (4,737) and FCS Youngstown State (3,418) and thus are not listed in the categories above.

==== Most yards rushing, season ====
FBS: 2,628 – Barry Sanders, Oklahoma State, 1988, 344 rushes, 11 games
FCS: 2,519 – Terrance West, Towson, 2013, 413 rushes, 16 games
Div II: 2,756 – Danny Woodhead, Chadron State, 2006, 344 rushes
Div III: 2,790 – Nate Kmic, Mount Union, 2008, 377 rushes

==== Most yards rushing, game ====
FBS: 427 – Samaje Perine, Oklahoma vs. Kansas, Nov. 22, 2014, 34 carries
FCS: 437 – Maurice Hicks, North Carolina A&T vs. Morgan State, Oct. 6, 2001, 34 carries
Div II: 425 – Connor Silveria, South Dakota Mines vs. Adams State, Oct. 13, 2018, 46 carries
Div III: 522 – Montie Quinn, Curry vs. Nichols, Oct. 18, 2025, 20 carries

==== Most yards rushing by two players, same team, game ====
FBS: 544 – Michael Carter 308 (24 carries) and Javonte Williams 236 (23 carries), North Carolina vs Miami, FL December 12, 2020
FCS:
Div II:
Div III:

==== Most rushing yards by a quarterback, career ====
FBS: 4,559 – Keenan Reynolds, Navy, 2012–15, 977 rushes
FCS: 4,852 – Matt Cannon, Southern Utah, 1997–2000, 674 rushes
Div II: 5,953 – Jason Vander Laan, Ferris State, 2012–15, 1010 rushes
Div III: 4,242 – Ayrton Scott, Augsburg, 2012–15, 722 rushes

==== Most rushing yards by a quarterback, season ====
FBS: 2,017 – Malcolm Perry, Navy, 2019, 295 rushes
FCS: 1,844 – Jayson Foster, Georgia Southern, 2007, 261 rushes
Div II: 1,607 – Jason Vander Laan, Ferris State, 2013, 265 rushes
Div III: 1,941 – Chris Sharpe, Springfield, 2006, 261 rushes

==== Most rushing yards by a quarterback, game ====
FBS: 327 – Khalil Tate, Arizona vs. Colorado, Oct. 7, 2017, 14 rushes
FCS: 330 – Matthew Sluka, Holy Cross vs. Lafayette, Oct. 21, 2023, 28 rushes
Div II: 323 – Shawn Graves, Wofford vs. Lenoir–Rhyne, Sep. 15, 1990, 23 rushes
Div III: 342 – Matt Roe, Augustana (IL) vs. Wheaton (IL), Nov. 13, 2004, 44 rushes

==== Most rushing touchdowns, career ====
FBS: 88 – Keenan Reynolds, Navy, 2012–15
FCS: 94 – Ian Smart, Long Island University, 1999–2002
Div II: 107 – Germaine Race, Pittsburg State, 2003–06
Div III: 125 – Nate Kmic, Mount Union, 2005–08

==== Most rushing touchdowns, season ====
FBS: 39 – Barry Sanders, Oklahoma State, 1988, 11 games and Montee Ball, Wisconsin, 2011, 14 games
FCS: 41 – Terrance West, Towson, 2013, 16 games
Div II: 38 – Chavon Wright, Virginia Union, 2024, 12 games
Div III: 44 – Nate Kmic, Mount Union, 2008, 15 games

==== Most rushing touchdowns, game ====
FBS: 8 – Howard Griffith, Illinois GRIFFITH`S NCAA-RECORD 8 TDS PACE ILLINI, 1990; Kalen Ballage, Arizona State, 2016; Jaret Patterson, Buffalo, 2020
FCS: 7 – Archie Amerson, Northern Arizona, 1996
Div II: 8 – Junior Wolf, Oklahoma Panhandle State, 1958
Div III: 8 – Donavan Henderson, Manchester, 2019; Carey Bender, Coe, 1994

==== Most rushing touchdowns by a quarterback, career ====
FBS: 88 – Keenan Reynolds, Navy, 2012–15
FCS: 69 – Matt Cannon, Southern Utah, 1997–2000
Div II: 81 – Jason Vander Laan, Ferris State, 2012–15
Div III: 70 – Chris Sharpe, Springfield, 2004–06

==== Most rushing touchdowns by a quarterback, season ====
FBS: 32 – Bryson Daily, Army, 2024
FCS: 29 – Chandler Burks, Kennesaw State, 2018
Div II: 24 – Shawn Graves, Wofford, 1989; Jason Vander Laan, Ferris State, 2015
Div III: 35 – Chris Sharpe, Springfield, 2006, 12 games

==== Most rushing touchdowns by a quarterback, game ====
FBS: 7 – Keenan Reynolds, Navy vs. San Jose State, Nov 22, 2013
FCS:
Div II:
Div III: 7 – Chris Sharpe, Springfield, vs. St. John Fisher, October 11, 2006

==== Most games with 100+ rushing yards, career ====
FBS: 34 – DeAngelo Williams, Memphis, 2002–05
FCS: 40 – Adrian Peterson, Georgia Southern, 1998–2001
Div III: 42 – Levell Coppage, Wisconsin–Whitewater, 2008–11

==== Most games with a touchdown, career ====
FBS: 46 – Travis Etienne Jr, Clemson, 2017–20
FCS:
Div II:
Div III:

=== Passing ===
==== Highest passing efficiency rating, career ====
FBS: 181.3 – Kyler Murray, Texas A&M and Oklahoma, 2015–18 (min. 325 completions)
FCS: 176.7 – Josh Johnson, San Diego, 2004–07 (min. 300 completions)
Div II: 190.8 – Dusty Bonner, Valdosta State, 2000–01 (min. 375 completions)
Div III: 211.2 – Luke Lehnen, North Central, 2021–24 (min. 325 completions)

==== Highest passing efficiency rating, season (min. 15 attempts per team game) ====
FBS: 208.0 – Jayden Daniels, LSU, 2023
FCS: 204.6 – Shawn Knight, William & Mary, 1993
Div II: 210.1 – Boyd Crawford, Albertson, 1953
Div III: 262.2 – Luke Lehnen, 2023

==== Highest passing efficiency rating, game ====
FBS: 403.4 – Tim Clifford, Indiana vs Colorado, 1980 (min. 12 attempts); 317.4 – Bruce Gradkowski, Toledo vs Buffalo, 2003 (min. 25 attempts); 248.0 – Geno Smith, West Virginia vs Baylor, 2012 (min. 50 attempts)
FCS: 409.9 – Taryn Christion, South Dakota State vs Arkansas Pine-Bluff, 2018 (min. 12 attempts)
Div II:
Div III:

==== Highest percentage of passes completed, game ====
FBS: 90.6% – Seth Doege, Texas Tech vs. New Mexico, Sep. 17, 2011 (min. 40 completions); 93.9% – Kyle Allen, Houston vs. Rice, Sep. 16, 2017 (min. 30 completions); 96.0% – Greyson Lambert, Georgia vs. South Carolina, Sep. 18, 2015 (min. 20 completions)
FCS: 94.6% – Taron Dickens, Western Carolina vs. Wofford, Oct. 4, 2025 (min. 30 completions); 96.2% – Ricky Santos, New Hampshire vs. Northeastern, Oct. 22, 2005 (min. 20 completions)
Div II: 90.0% – Lance Parker, Ouachita Baptist vs. Southwest Baptist, Oct. 25, 2008 (min. 35 completions); 96.0% – Zack Eskridge, Midwestern State vs. Texas A&M–Kingsville, Oct. 17, 2009 (min. 20 completions)
Div III: 84.9% – Ian Kolste, Whitworth vs. George Fox, Oct. 1, 2016 (min. 35 completions); 95.5% – Mark Petruziello, John Carroll vs. Thomas More, Sep. 6, 2008 (min. 20 completions)

==== Highest percentage of passes completed, career ====
FBS: 70.4% – Colt Brennan, Hawaiʻi, 2005–07 (minimum 875 attempts)
FCS: 69.6% – Eric Sanders, Northern Iowa, 2004–07 (minimum 750 attempts)
Div II: 72.7% – Dusty Bonner, Valdosta State, 2000–01 (minimum 500 attempts)
Div III: 74.1% – Greg Micheli, Mount Union, 2005–08 (minimum 750 attempts)

==== Highest percentage of passes completed, season ====
FBS: 78.9% – Julian Sayin, Ohio State, 2025 (minimum 150 attempts)
FCS: 75.2% – Eric Sanders, Northern Iowa, 2007 (minimum 200 attempts)
Div II: 76.9% – Troy Weatherhead, Hillsdale, 2010 (minimum 250 attempts)
Div III: 77.9% – Nick Semptimphelter, John Carroll, 2025 (minimum 250 attempts)

==== Most yards passing, career ====
FBS: 19,217 – Case Keenum, Houston, 2007–11
FCS: 14,584 – Devlin Hodges, Samford, 2015–18
Div II: 17,034 – Tyson Bagent, Shepherd, 2018–22
Div III: 14,265 – Broc Rutter, North Central (IL), 2016–19

==== Most yards passing, season ====
FBS: 5,967 – Bailey Zappe, Western Kentucky, 2021
FCS: 5,076 – Taylor Heinicke, Old Dominion, 2012
Div II: 5,207 – Eric Czerniewski, Central Missouri, 2010
Div III: 5,068 – Joe Callahan, Wesley, 2015

==== Most yards passing, game ====
FBS: 734 – Connor Halliday, Washington State vs Cal, Oct. 4, 2014; Patrick Mahomes, Texas Tech vs Oklahoma, Oct. 22, 2016
FCS: 730 – Taylor Heinicke, Old Dominion vs. New Hampshire, Sep. 22, 2012
Div II: 695 – J. J. Harp, Eastern New Mexico vs. Southeastern Oklahoma, Sep. 12, 2009
Div III: 736 – Sam Durley, Eureka vs. Knox (IL), Sep. 1, 2012

==== Most yards passing, quarter ====
FBS: 340 – Andre Ware, Houston, 1989

==== Most yards passing, half ====
FBS: 517 – Andre Ware, Houston, 1989

==== Most yards passing per game, season ====
FBS: 467.3 – David Klingler, Houston, 1990
FCS: 455.7 – Willie Totten, Mississippi Valley, 1984
Div II: 437.3 – J. J. Harp, Eastern New Mexico, 2009
Div III: 450.1 – Justin Peery, Westminster (MO), 1998

==== Most passes attempted, career ====
FBS: 2,436 – Timmy Chang, Hawaii, 2000–04
FCS: 1,896 – Devlin Hodges, Samford, 2015–18
Div II: 2,187 – Bo Cordell, Tusculum, 2009–13
Div III: 1,982 – Josh Vogelbach, Guilford, 2005–08

==== Most passes attempted, season ====
FBS: 719 – B. J. Symons, Texas Tech, 2003
FCS: 598 – Jeremy Moses, Stephen F. Austin, 2008
Div II: 670 – Eric Czerniewski, Central Missouri, 2010
Div III: 575 – Brett Dietz, Hanover, 2003

==== Most passes attempted, game ====
FBS: 89 – Connor Halliday, Washington State vs. Oregon, October 19, 2013
FCS: 85 – Jeremy Moses, Stephen F. Austin vs. Sam Houston State, Nov. 1, 2008
Div II: 94 – J. J. Harp, Eastern New Mexico vs. Southeastern Oklahoma, Sep. 12, 2009
Div III: 84 – Evan Jones, Carthage vs. North Central (IL), Oct. 17, 2009; Mackenzie McGrady, Alma vs. Wisconsin–River Falls, Sep. 26, 2009; McCallum Foote, Middlebury vs. Amherst, Oct. 5, 2013

==== Most passes completed, career ====
FBS: 1,546 – Case Keenum, Houston, 2007–11
FCS: 1,310 – Devlin Hodges, Samford, 2015–18
Div II: 1,400 – Tyson Bagent, Shepherd, 2018–22
Div III: 1,205 – Alex Tanney, Monmouth (IL), 2007–11

==== Most passes completed, season ====
FBS: 512 – Graham Harrell, Texas Tech, 2007
FCS: 385 – Jeremy Moses, Stephen F. Austin, 2009; Brett Gordon, Villanova, 2002
Div II: 447 – Eric Czerniewski, Central Missouri, 2010
Div III: 360 – Brett Dietz, Hanover, 2003

==== Most passes completed, game ====
FBS: 58 – Andy Schmitt, Eastern Michigan vs. Central Michigan, Nov. 28, 2008; Connor Halliday, Washington State vs. Oregon, Oct. 19, 2013
FCS: 57 – Jeremy Moses, Stephen F. Austin vs. Sam Houston State, Nov. 1, 2008
Div II: 64 – J. J. Harp, Eastern New Mexico vs. Southeastern Oklahoma, Sep. 12, 2009
Div III: 58 – Bryan Peterson, Whitworth vs. La Verne, Sep. 20, 2014

==== Most passes completed per game, career ====
FBS: 31.2 – Graham Harrell, Texas Tech, 2005–08
FCS: 29.8 – Devlin Hodges, Samford, 2015–18
Div II: 30.4 – Bo Cordell, Tusculum, 2009–13
Div III: 29.7 – Josh Vogelbach, Guilford, 2005–08

==== Most passes completed per game, season ====
FBS: 39.4 – Graham Harrell, Texas Tech, 2007
FCS: 32.4 – Willie Totten, Mississippi Valley, 1984
Div II: 40.4 – J. J. Harp, Eastern New Mexico, 2009
Div III: 34.0 – Bryan Peterson, Whitworth University (WA), 2014

==== Most touchdown passes, career ====
FBS: 155 – Case Keenum, Houston, 2007–11
FCS: 140 – Bruce Eugene, Grambling State, 2001–05
Div II: 162 – John Matocha, Colorado School of Mines, 2019–23
Div III: 162 – Luke Lehnen, North Central College, 2021–24

==== Most touchdown passes, season ====
FBS: 62 – Bailey Zappe, Western Kentucky, 2021
FCS: 60 – Lindsey Scott Jr., Incarnate Word, 2022
Div II: 54 – Dusty Bonner, Valdosta State, 2000; Zach Zulli, Shippensburg, 2012
Div III: 63 – Blaine Hawkins, Central (IA), 2021

==== Most touchdown passes, game ====
FBS: 11 – David Klingler, Houston vs. Eastern Washington, Nov. 17, 1990
FCS: 10 – Ren Hefley, Presbyterian vs. St. Andrews, September 4, 2021
Div II: 10 – Bruce Swanson, North Park vs. North Central (IL), Oct. 12, 1968
Div III: 9 – Joe Zarlinga, Ohio Northern vs. Capital, Nov. 14, 1998
Chaiten Tomlin Mount St Joseph vs. Anderson Oct.21, 2017

==== Most consecutive games throwing touchdown pass ====
FBS: 46 – Rakeem Cato, Marshall, 2011–14
FCS: 42 – Dominic Randolph, Holy Cross, 2006–09
Div II: 46 – Mike Reilly, Central Washington, 2005–08
Div III: 59 – Luke Lehnen, North Central, 2021–24 (every game of his career)

==== Most passes intercepted, career ====
FBS: 80 – Timmy Chang, Hawaii, 2000–04
FCS: 75 – Willie Totten, Mississippi Valley, 1982–85
Div II: 88 – Bob McLaughlin, Lock Haven, 1992–95
Div III: 117 – Steve Hendry, Wisconsin–Superior, 1980–83

==== Most passes intercepted, season ====
FBS: 34 – John Eckman, Wichita State, 1966
FCS: 31 – Ren Hefley, Presbyterian college, 2021
Div II: 32 – Joe Stetser, Chico State, 1967
Div III: 43 – Steve Hendry, Wisconsin–Superior, 1982

==== Most passes intercepted, game ====
FBS: 9 – John Reaves, Florida vs. Auburn, Nov. 1, 1969
FCS: 7 – Dan Crowley, Towson vs. Maine, Nov. 16, 1991; Carlton Jenkins, Mississippi Valley vs. Prairie View, Oct. 31, 1987; Charles Hebert, Southeastern Louisiana vs. Northwestern State, Nov. 12, 1983; Mick Spoon, Idaho State vs. Montana, Oct. 21, 1978; Darius Perrantes, Duquesne vs. Central Connecticut, Nov. 23, 2024
Div II: 9 – Pat Brennan, Franklin vs. Saginaw Valley, Sep. 24, 1983; Henry Schafer, Johns Hopkins vs. Haverford, Oct. 16, 1965
Div III: 8 – Jason Clark, Ohio Northern vs. John Carroll, Nov. 9, 1991; Jim Higgins, Brockport vs. Buffalo State, Sep. 29, 1990; Dennis Bogacz, Wisconsin–Oshkosh vs. Wisconsin–Stevens Point, Oct. 29, 1988; Kevin Karwath, Canisius vs. Liberty, Nov. 19, 1979

==== Most pass attempts without an interception, game ====
FBS: 77 – David Piland, Houston vs. Louisiana Tech, Sep. 8, 2012
FCS: 79 – Taylor Heinicke, Old Dominion vs. New Hampshire, Sep. 22, 2012
Div II: 74 – Michael Pierce, St. Anselm vs. Stonehill, Oct. 24, 2009
Div III: 82 – Bryan Peterson, Whitworth (WA) vs. LaVerne, Sep. 20, 2014

==== Most consecutive pass attempts without an interception ====
FBS: 444 – Colby Cameron, Louisiana Tech, 2011–12
FCS: 342 – Jimmy Blanchard, Portland State, 1999
Div II: 280 – Jesse Showerda, New Haven, 1996
Div III: 305 – Brad Boyle, Coe, 2009

==== Lowest percentage of passes intercepted, career ====
FBS: 1.20% – Marcus Mariota, Oregon, 2012–14 (min. 600 attempts)
FCS: 1.41% – Josh Johnson, San Diego, 2004–07 (min. 750 attempts)
Div II: 1.29% – Malik Grove, Notre Dame College, 2014–2017 (min. 1,000 attempts)
Div III: 1.15% – Greg Micheli, Mount Union, 2005–08 (min. 750 attempts); 1.47% – Bobby Swallow, Washington & Jefferson, 2005–08 (min. 1,000 attempts)

==== Lowest percentage of passes intercepted, season ====
FBS: 0.0% – Matt Blundin, Virginia, 1991 (150–349 attempts); 0.70% – Kellen Moore, Boise State, 2009 (min. 350 attempts)
FCS: 0.00% – Trey Lance, North Dakota State, 2019 (150–349 attempts); 0.78% – Pat Devlin, Delaware, 2010 (min. 350 attempts)
Div II: 0.32% – Billy Cundiff, Ashland, 2009 (min. 300 attempts)
Div III: 0.2% – Matt Behrendt, Wisconsin–Whitewater, 2013 (min. 150 attempts)

==== Most consecutive completions in a single game ====
FBS: 26 – Dominique Davis, East Carolina vs. Navy, Oct. 22, 2011
FCS: 46 – Taron Dickens, Western Carolina vs. Wofford, Oct. 4, 2025
Div II: 20 – Scott Buisson, Arkansas–Monticello vs. Henderson State, Sep. 22, 2008; Todd Cunningham, Presbyterian vs. Wingate, Oct. 20, 1999; Chris Hatcher, Valdosta State vs. New Haven, Oct. 8, 1994; Rod Bockwoldt, Weber State vs. South Dakota State, Nov. 6, 1976
Div III: 21 – Chris Edwards, Washington & Jefferson vs. Allegheny, Sep. 17, 2005

==== Most consecutive completions in one or more games ====
FBS: 36 – Dominique Davis, East Carolina, last 10 attempts vs. Memphis, Oct. 15, 2011 and first 26 vs. Navy, Oct. 22, 2011
FCS: Same as record for most consecutive completions in one game, above
Div II: 23 – Mike Ganey, Allegheny, last 16 attempts vs. Carnegie Mellon, Oct. 9, 1967 and first seven attempts vs. Oberlin, Oct. 16, 1967
Div III: 29 – Chris Edwards, Washington & Jefferson. last eight attempts vs. Hanover, Sep. 10, 2005 and first 21 attempts vs. Allegheny, Sep. 17, 2005

=== Receiving ===
==== Most receptions, career ====
FBS: 399 – Zay Jones, East Carolina, 2013–16
FCS: 428 – Cooper Kupp, Eastern Washington, 2013–16
Div II: 430 – Chris George, Glenville State Pioneers, 1991–94
Div III: 463 – Michael Zweifel, Wisconsin–River Falls and University of Dubuque, 2007–11

==== Most receptions by a tight end, career ====
FBS: 247 – Chase Coffman, Missouri, 2005-08
FCS: 245 - Brian Forster, Rhode Island, 1983-85, 1987
Div II: 285 - Ryan Travis, West Liberty, 2007-10
Div III: 203 - Jon Branche, Rensselaer Polytechnic Institute (RPI), 2003-06

==== Most receptions, season ====
FBS: 158 – Zay Jones, East Carolina, 2016
FCS: 136 – Erik Lora, Eastern Illinois, 2012
Div II: 146 – Freddie Martino, North Greenville University, 2013
Div III: 140 – Michael Zweifel, Dubuque (IA), 2011

==== Most receptions by a tight end, season ====
FBS: 117 – Harold Fannin Jr., Bowling Green State University, 2024
FCS: 120 - Stephen Campbell, Brown Universty, 2000
Div II: 126 - Ryan Travis, West Liberty, 2010
Div III: 203 - Brad Kalsow, Wisconsin–Stevens Point, 2008

==== Most receptions, game ====
FBS: 23 – Tyler Jones, Eastern Michigan vs. Central Michigan, Nov. 28, 2008; Randy Gatewood, UNLV vs. Idaho, Sep. 17, 1994
FCS: 24 – Chas Gessner, Brown vs. Rhode Island, Oct. 5, 2002; Jerry Rice, Mississippi Valley vs. Southern, Oct. 1, 1983
Div II: 23 – Mitchell Shegos, Notre Dame (OH) vs. Glenville State, Oct. 25, 2014; Chris George, Glenville State vs. West Virginia Wesleyan, Oct. 15, 1994; Barry Wagner, Alabama A&M vs. Clark Atlanta, Nov. 4, 1989
Div III: 25 – Daniel Passafiume, Hanover vs. Franklin, Nov. 15, 2009

==== Most receptions by a tight end, game ====
FBS: 17 – Emilio Vallez, New Mexico vs. UTEP, Oct. 27, 1967; Jon Harvey, Northwestern vs. Michigan, Oct. 23, 1982; Tyler Warren, Penn State vs. USC, Oct. 12, 2024; Harold Fannin Jr., Bowling Green vs. Arkansas State, Dec. 26, 2024
FCS: 18 - Brian Forster, Rhode island vs. Brown, Sept. 28, 1985
Div II: 16 - David Pawelek, Colorado School of Mines vs. Western State, Oct. 27, 2012
Div III: 17 - Matt Surette, WPI vs. Springfield, Oct. 25, 1997

==== Most consecutive games with a reception ====
FBS: 58 – Sam Pinckney, Georgia State/Coastal Carolina, 2018–2023
FCS: 52 – Cooper Kupp, Eastern Washington, 2013–2016
Div II: 50 – Mike Washington, West Chester, 2005–08
Div III: 50 – Fritz Waldvogel, St. Thomas (MN), 2008–11

==== Most yards receiving, career ====
FBS: 5,278 – Corey Davis, Western Michigan, 2013–16
FCS: 6,464 – Cooper Kupp, Eastern Washington, 2013–16
Div II: 4,983 – Clarence Coleman, Ferris State, 1998–2001
Div III: 6,108 – Scott Pingel, Westminster (MO), 1996–99

==== Most yards receiving by a tight end, career ====
FBS: 2,901 – Dennis Pitta, BYU, 2004, 2007-09
FCS: 3,410 - Brian Forster, Rhode Island, 1983-85, 1987
Div II: 3,328 - Ryan Travis, West Liberty, 2007-10
Div III: 2,849 - Jon Branche, Rensselaer Polytechnic Institute (RPI), 2003-06

==== Most yards receiving, season ====
FBS: 2,060 – Trevor Insley, Nevada, 1999
FCS: 1,850 – Brandon Kaufman, Eastern Washington, 2012
Div II: 1,821 – Isaac Stonefield Glenville State, 2020
Div III: 2,157 – Scott Pingel, Westminster (MO), 1998

==== Most yards receiving by a tight end, season ====
FBS: 1,555 – Harold Fannin Jr., Bowling Green State University, 2024
FCS: 1,617 - Brian Forster, Rhode Island, 1985
Div II: 1,402 - Ryan Travis, West Liberty, 2010
Div III: 1,290 – Don Moehling, Wisconsin–Stevens Point, 1988

==== Most yards receiving, game ====
FBS: 405 – Troy Edwards, Louisiana Tech vs. Nebraska, Aug. 29, 1998
FCS: 376 – Kassim Osgood, Cal Poly vs. Northern Iowa, Nov. 4, 2000
Div II: 425 – Trey McVay, Northeastern State vs. Harding, Oct. 15, 2011
Div III: 418 – Lewis Howes, Principia vs. Martin Luther, Oct. 12, 2002

==== Most yards receiving by a tight end, game ====
FBS: 259 – Gordon Hudson, BYU vs. Utah, Nov. 21, 1981
FCS: 327 - Brian Forster, Rhode Island vs Brown, Sept. 28, 1985
Div II: 290 - Bob Tucker, Bloomsburg vs. Susquehanna, Oct. 7, 1967
Div III: 362 - Matt Surette, WPI vs. Springfield, Oct. 25, 1997

==== Highest receiving yards per game, career ====
FBS: 140.9 – Alex Van Dyke, Nevada, 1994–95
FCS: 124.3 – Cooper Kupp, Eastern Washington, 2013–16
Div II: 160.8 – Chris George, Glenville State, 1993–94
Div III: 156.6 – Scott Pingel, Westminster (MO), 1996–99

==== Highest receiving yards per game by a tight end, career ====
FBS: 75.3 – Gordon Hudson, BYU, 1980-83
FCS:
Div II:
Div III:

==== Highest receiving yards per game, season ====
FBS: 187.3 – Trevor Insley, Nevada, 1999
FCS: 168.2 – Jerry Rice, Mississippi Valley, 1984
Div II: 187.6 – Chris George, Glenville State, 1993
Div III: 215.7 – Scott Pingel, Westminster (MO), 1998

==== Highest receiving yards per game by a tight end, season ====
FBS: 119.6 – Harold Fannin Jr., Bowling Green State University, 2024
FCS: 161.7 - Brian Forster, Rhode Island, 1985
Div II: 140.2 - Ryan Travis, West Liberty, 2010
Div III:

==== Most games with 100 yards receiving, career ====
FBS: 27 – Corey Davis, Western Michigan, 2013–16
FCS: 29 – Cooper Kupp, Eastern Washington, 2013–16
Div II: 30 – Patrick Ondis Briley, Langston, 82–85
Div III:

==== Most receiving touchdowns, career ====
FBS: 60 – Jarett Dillard, Rice, 2005–08
FCS: 73 – Cooper Kupp, Eastern Washington, 2013–16
Div II: 78 – Dallas Mall, Bentley, 2001–04
Div III: 75 – Scott Pingel, Westminster (MO), 1996–99

==== Most receiving touchdowns by a tight end, career ====
FBS: 31 – Darius Hill, Ball State, 2005-08
FCS: 32 - Brian Forster, Rhode Island, 1983-85, 1987
Div II: 34 - Ryan Travis, West Liberty, 2007-10
Div III: 35 - Jon Branche, Rensselaer Polytechnic Institute (RPI), 2003-06

==== Most receiving touchdowns, season ====
FBS: 27 – Troy Edwards, Louisiana Tech, 1998
FCS: 27 – Jerry Rice, Mississippi Valley, 1984
Div II: 35 – David Kircus, Grand Valley State, 2002
Div III: 31 – Andrew Kamienski, North Central (IL), 2019

==== Most receiving touchdowns by a tight end, season ====
FBS: 18 – Dennis Smith, Utah, 1989
FCS: 13 - MyCole Pruitt, Southern Illinois, 2014
Div II: 16 - Adam Shaheen, Ashland University, 2016
Div III:

==== Most receiving touchdowns, game ====
FBS: 7 – Rashaun Woods, Oklahoma State vs. SMU, Sep. 20, 2003
FCS: 6 – Cos DeMatteo, Chattanooga vs. Mississippi Valley, Sep. 16, 2000
Div II: 8 – Paul Zaeske, North Park vs. North Central (IL), Oct. 12, 1968
Div III: 7 – Matt Perceval, Wesleyan (CT) vs. Middlebury, Sept. 26, 1998

==== Most receiving touchdowns by a tight end, game ====
FBS: 4 – Trent Smith, Oklahoma vs. Kansas, Oct. 13, 2001; Jermaine Gresham, Oklahoma vs Texas A&M, Nov. 3, 2007; Drake Dunsmore, Northwestern vs Indiana, Oct. 29, 2011, Colby Parkinson, Stanford vs. Oregon State, Nov. 11, 2018; Kyle Pitts, Florida vs. Ole Miss, Sept. 26, 2020; Isaiah Likely, Coastal Carolina vs. Arkansas State, Oct, 7, 2021; Patrick Overmyer, Houston vs. Kansas State, Oct. 10, 2026
FCS: 4 - Dallas Goedert, South Dakota State vs. Western Illinois, Oct. 1, 2016
Div II:
Div III:

=== Scoring ===
==== Most touchdowns responsible for, career ====
FBS: 189 – Dillon Gabriel, UCF, Oklahoma, Oregon, 2019–24
FCS: 159 – Bruce Eugene, Grambling, 2001–05
Div II: 190 – John Matocha, Colorado Mines, 2019–Present
Div III: 213 – Luke Lehnen, North Central (IL), 2021–24

==== Most touchdowns responsible for, season ====
FBS: 65 – Joe Burrow, LSU, 2019; Bailey Zappe, Western Kentucky, 2021
FCS: 71 Lindsey Scott Jr. UIW 2022
Div II: 61 – Roland Rivers III, Slippery Rock, 2019
Div III: 68 – Blaine Hawkins, Central (IA), 2021

==== Most touchdowns responsible for, game ====
FBS: 11 – David Klingler, Houston vs. Eastern Washington, Nov. 17, 1990
FCS: 10 – Ren Hefley, Presbyterian vs. St. Andrews, September 4, 2021
Div II: 10 – Bruce Swanson, North Park vs. North Central (IL), Oct. 12, 1968
Div III:

==== Most points responsible for, career ====
FBS: 1,130 – Dillon Gabriel (*6 seasons) —UCF, Oklahoma, Oregon, 2019–24
FCS: 960 – Bruce Eugene, Grambling, 2001–05
Div II: 966 – Jimmy Terwilliger, East Stroudsburg, 2003–06
Div III: 780 - Nate Kmic, Mount Union, 2005–08

==== Most points responsible for, season ====
FBS: 394 – Bailey Zappe, Western Kentucky, 2021
FCS: 368 – Willie Totten, Mississippi Valley, 1984
Div II: 366 - Roland Rivers III, Slippery Rock, 2019
Div III: 410 – Blaine Hawkins, Central (IA), 2021

==== Most points responsible for, game ====
FBS: 66 – David Klingler, Houston vs. Eastern Washington, Nov. 17, 1990
FCS: 64 – Ren Hefley, Presbyterian vs. St. Andrews, September 4, 2021

==== Most points scored by kicker, career ====
FBS: 533 – Will Reichard, Alabama, 2019-23
FCS: 542 – Ethan Ratke, James Madison, 2017–21
Div II: 420 – Jeff Glas, North Dakota, 2002–05
Div III: 383 – Mike Zimmerman, Mount Union, 2005–07

==== Most points scored by kicker, season ====
FBS: 157 – Roberto Aguayo, Florida State, 2013
FCS: 127 – Julian Rauch, Appalachian State, 2007; Jon Striefsky, Delaware, 2007
Div II: 138 – Jeff Glas, North Dakota, 2005
Div III: 183 – Edward Ruhnke, Mount Union, 2014

==== Most points scored by kicker, game ====
FBS: 24 – Mike Prindle, Western Michigan vs. Marshall, Sep. 29, 1984; Dominik Eberle, Utah State vs. New Mexico State, Sep. 8, 2018
FCS: 24 – Goran Lingmerth, Northern Arizona vs. Idaho, Oct. 25, 1986
Div II: 21 – Thomas Kopcho, Missouri Western State University vs. Northeastern State (OK), Oct. 16, 2021
Div III: 20 – Jim Hever, Rhodes vs. Millsaps, Sep. 22, 1984

==== Most points scored, career ====
FBS: 533 – Will Reichard, Alabama, 2019–23
FCS: 544 – Brian Westbrook, Villanova, 1997–98, 2000–01
Div II: 656 – Germaine Race, Pittsburg State, 2003–06
Div III: 780 – Nate Kmic, Mount Union, 2005–08

==== Most points scored, season ====
FBS: 236 – Montee Ball, Wisconsin, 2011
FCS: 234 – Omar Cuff, Delaware, 2007
Div II: 228 – Xavier Omon, Northwest Missouri State, 2007; Danny Woodhead, Chadron State, 2006
Div III: 264 – Nate Kmic, Mount Union, 2008

==== Most points scored, game ====
FBS: 48 – Howard Griffith, Illinois vs. Southern Illinois, September 22, 1990; Kalen Ballage, Arizona State vs. Texas Tech, September 10, 2016; Jaret Patterson, Buffalo vs. Kent State, November 28, 2020
FCS: 42 – Omar Cuff, Delaware vs. William & Mary, Aug. 30, 2007; Jessie Burton, McNeese State vs. Southern Utah, Sep. 19, 1998; Archie Amerson, Northern Arizona vs. Weber State, Oct. 5, 1996
Div II: 48 – Paul Zaeske, North Park vs. North Central (IL), Oct. 12, 1968; Junior Wolf, Oklahoma Panhandle vs. St. Mary (KS), Nov. 8, 1958
Div III: 48 – Carey Bender, Coe vs. Beloit, Nov. 12, 1994

== Defense ==
=== Interceptions ===
==== Most interceptions, career ====
FBS: 29 – Al Brosky, Illinois, 1950–52
FCS: 31 – Rashean Mathis, Bethune–Cookman, 1999–2003
Div II: 37 – Tom Collins, Indianapolis, 1982–85
Div III: 32 – Zach Autenrieb, Thomas More (KY) 2009–12

==== Most interceptions, season ====
FBS: 14 – Al Worley, Washington, 1968; Gerod Holliman, Louisville, 2014
FCS: 14 – Rashean Mathis, Bethune–Cookman, 2002
Div II: 14 – Seven times. Most recent: Dan Peters, Shepherd, 2006
Div III: 15 – Ben Matthews, Bethel (MN), 2000; Mark Dorner, Juniata, 1987

==== Most team interceptions, game ====
FBS: 10^{*} – Oklahoma St. vs. Detroit, Nov. 28, 1942; UCLA vs. California, Oct. 21, 1978

NCAA single game national record. 11 interceptions: St. Cloud State College vs Bemidji, Oct. 31, 1970. (5 by safety Bill Trewick, 3 by linebacker Mark Swedlund and 3 by safety Ted Lockett).

^{*}The NCAA lists two different records for team interceptions in a game. The listed record is for "Most passes intercepted by against a major-college opponent". The unrestricted "Most passes intercepted by" is held by Brown, with 11, in a game versus Rhode Island, Oct. 8, 1949.

==== Most interceptions, game ====
FBS: 5^{*†} – 4 times: Lee Cook, Oklahoma St. vs. Detroit, Nov. 28, 1942; Walt Pastuszak, Brown vs. Rhode Island, Oct. 8, 1949; Byron Beaver, Houston vs. Baylor, Sep. 22, 1962; Dan Rebsch, Miami (OH) vs. Western Mich., Nov. 4, 1972
FCS: 5 – 3 times: Mark Cordes, Eastern Washington vs. Boise State, Sep. 6, 1986; Michael Richardson, Northwestern State vs. Southeastern Louisiana, Nov. 12, 1983; Karl Johnson, Jackson State vs. Grambling, Oct. 23, 1982

NCAA National record: 5 interceptions by Bill Trewick, St. Cloud State vs. Bemidji, Oct. 31, 1970.

Gary Evans, Truman vs. Missouri S&T, Oct. 18, 1975.

Div III: 5 – 11 times. Most recent: James Patrick, Stillman vs. Edward Waters, Nov. 2, 2002 Eric Gargiulo Montclair State University vs Southern Virginia 10/10/2014

^{*}The NCAA record book includes a special note about 6 interceptions by Dick Miller (Akron) versus Baldwin-Wallace on Oct. 23, 1937 before the collection of division records.

^{†}Tulane University lists 5 interceptions by Mitchell Price in a game versus Tennessee–Chattanooga September 3, 1988 which is not recognized as an official statistic by the NCAA.

==== Consecutive games with an interception ====
FBS: 15 – Al Brosky, Illinois, Nov. 11, 1950 to Oct. 18, 1952
FCS: 8 – Jamar Williams, Morgan State University, 1998–2001
FCS: 8 – Justin Ford, University of Montana, 2021
Div II: 8 – Darin Nix, Missouri S&T, 1993–94
Div III: 9 – Brent Sands, Cornell College, 1992

==== Most interceptions returned for a touchdown, career ====
FBS: 6 – Emmanuel Forbes, Mississippi State, 2020–22
FCS: 6 – William Hampton, Murray State, 1993–96, Marcus Williams, North Dakota State 2010–13
Div II:
Div III:

==== Most interceptions returned for a touchdown, season ====
FBS: 4 – Deltha O'Neal, California, 1999
FCS: 4 – William Hampton, Murray State, 1995; Joseph Vaughn, Cal State Northridge, 1994; Robert Turner, Jackson State, 1990
Div II: 4 – Stevie Harden, Valdosta State, 2010; Quintez Smith, Shaw, 2009; Clay Blalack, UT Martin, 1976
Div III: 4 – Phil Terio, Salve Regina, 2012

==== Most interceptions returned for a touchdown, game ====
FBS: 3 – Johnnie Jackson, Houston vs. Texas, Nov. 7, 1987
FCS: 2 – 23 times. Most recent: Jeffrey Smyth, Presbyterian College vs. Stetson University, Apr. 3, 2021
Div II:
Div III: 3 – Many times.

==== Most interception return yards, career ====
FBS: 501 – Terrell Buckley, Florida State, 1989–91
FCS: 682 – Rashean Mathis, Bethune–Cookman, 1999–2002
Div II: 528 – Pierre Thomas, Missouri Western State, 2000–03
Div III: 448 – Todd Schoelzel, Wisconsin–Oshkosh, 1985–88

==== Most interception return yards, season ====
FBS: 302 – Charles Phillips, Southern California, 1974
FCS: 455 – Rashean Mathis, Bethune–Cookman, 2002
Div II: 362 – Pierre Thomas, Missouri Western State, 2003
Div III: 358 – Rod Pesek, Whittier, 1987

==== Most interception return yards, game ====
FBS: 182 – Ashley Lee, Virginia Tech vs. Vanderbilt, Nov. 12, 1983
FCS: 216 – Keiron Bigby, Brown vs. Yale, Sep. 29, 1984
Div II: 194 – Quintez Smith, Shaw vs. Elizabeth City State, Aug. 29, 2009
Div III: 164 – Rick Conner, McDaniel vs. Dickinson, Oct. 15, 1983

=== Tackles ===
Since the 1960 season

==== Most tackles, career ====
FBS: 694 – John Offerdahl, Western Michigan, 1982–85
FCS: 580 – Boomer Grigsby, Illinois State, 2001–04
Div II: 633 – Connor Harris, Lindenwood, 2012–16
Div III: 712 – Keith LaDu, Oberlin, 1984–87

==== Highest tackles per game average, career ====
FBS: 15.00 – Rick Razzano, Virginia Tech, 1974–1977
FCS: 13.2 – Josh Cain, Chattanooga, 2000–02
Div II: 16.00 – Kevin Kilroy, Missouri Western, 1993–1996
Div III: 15.1 – Ryan Slager Grinnell, 2015–18

==== Most tackles, season ====
FBS: 198^{*} – Kevin McLain, Colorado State, 1975
FCS: 195 – Kevin Talley, Norfolk State, 2003
Div II: 169 – B. J. Russell, Mesa State, 2004
Div III: 201 – Keith LaDu, Oberlin, 1986

^{*}Mike Singletary (Baylor) Recorded 232 tackles in 1978 but the NCAA did not begin collecting defensive statistics until 2000

==== Highest tackles per game average, season ====
FBS: 15.92^{*} – Luke Kuechly, Boston College, 2011
FCS: 16.3 – Boomer Grigsby, Illinois State, 2002; Kevin Talley, Norfolk State, 2003
Div II: 15.9 – Allen Minus, Lincoln (MO), 2004
Div III: 19.8 – Kyle McGivney, Luther, 2010

^{*}Joe Norman (Indiana) recorded 199 tackles in 11 games in 1978 for an 18.09 average, but the NCAA did not begin collecting defensive statistics until 2000.

==== Most tackles, game ====
FBS: 32 ^{*} – [Harold Stuart] (linebacker)| West Texas State vs, Wichita State, Oct. 4, 1969 Harold Stuart (2015) – Hall of Champions
FCS: 31 – Ryan Greenhagen, Fordham vs. Nebraska, Sep. 4, 2021
Div II: 30 – Kevin Kilroy, Missouri Western vs. Northwest Missouri, September 17, 1994
Div II: 30** – Shaun Maloney, Minnesota–Morris vs. Minnesota State Moorhead, Oct. 27, 2001
Div III: 31 – Keith LaDu, Oberlin vs. Marietta, 1985

- Mike Singletary (Baylor) recorded 35 tackles against Houston and 33 tackles against Arkansas in 1978, but the NCAA did not begin collecting defensive statistics until 2000
- Lee Roy Jordan (Alabama) recorded 31 tackles against Oklahoma in the 1962 Orange Bowl, but the NCAA did not begin collecting defensive statistics until 2000
- Larry Mertz (Kutztown) recorded 31 tackles against Clarion on November 22, 1980, but the NCAA did not begin collecting defensive statistics until 2000

==== Most solo tackles, career ====
FBS: 360 – Rod Davis, Southern Miss., 2000–03
FCS: 325 – Boomer Grigsby, Illinois State, 2001–04
Div II: 323 – Connor Harris, Lindenwood, 2012–16
Div III: 302 – Kyle Follweiler, Wilkes, 2004–07

==== Highest solo tackles per game average, career ====
FBS: 8.80 – E. J. Henderson, Maryland, 2000–02
FCS: 8.00 – Josh Cain, Chattanooga, 2000–02
Div II: 9.2 – Kevin Kilroy, Missouri Western, 1993–1996
Div III: 7.35 – Casey McConnell, Kenyon, 2001–03

==== Most solo tackles, season ====
FBS: 135^{*} – E. J. Henderson, Maryland, 2002
FCS: 113 – Josh Cain, Chattanooga, 2002
Div II: 97 – Tyke Kozeal, University of Nebraska-Kearney, 2016
Div III: 106 – Robert Gunn, Earlham, 2000

^{*}Joe Norman (Indiana) recorded 141 solo tackles in 1978, but the NCAA did not begin collecting defensive statistics until 2000.

==== Highest solo tackles per game average, season ====
FBS: 10.20^{*} – Rick Sherrod, West Virginia, 2001
FCS: 9.82 – Boomer Grigsby, Illinois State, 2002
Div II: 8.81 – Tyke Kozeal, Nebraska–Kearney, 2016
Div III: 10.6 – Robert Gunn, Earlham, 2000

^{*}Joe Norman (Indiana) recorded 141 solo tackles in 11 games in 1978 for a 12.81 average, but the NCAA did not begin collecting defensive statistics until 2000.

==== Most solo tackles, game ====
FBS: 20 – Tyrell Johnson, Arkansas State vs. North Texas, Nov. 26, 2005
FCS: 21 – Dan Adams, Holy Cross, Oct. 22, 2005
Div II: 19 – Eric Portley, Fayetteville State vs. N.C. Central, Oct. 8, 2005
Div III: 21 – Tim Rotenberry, North Park vs. Millikin, Oct. 16, 2004; Ryan Martin, Hanover College vs. Anderson (IN), Oct. 17, 2015

==== Most tackles for loss, career ====
FBS: 75 – Khalil Mack, Buffalo, 2010–13, Jason Babin, Western Michigan, 2000–03
FCS: 80 – James Cowser, Southern Utah, 2012–15
Div II: 92.5 – Marcus Martin, Slippery Rock, 2014–2017
Div III: 106 1/2 – Steven Wilson, King's (PA), 2000–02

==== Highest tackles for loss per game average, career ====
FBS: 1.92 – Sammy Brown, Houston, 2010–11
FCS: 2.48 – Steve Baggs, Bethune-Cookman, 2002–03
Div II: 2.58 – Charlie Cook, C.W. Post, 2000–01
Div III: 3.33 – Steven Wilson, King's (PA), 2000–02

==== Most tackles for loss, season ====
FBS: 39 – Derrick Thomas, Alabama, 1988 2019 Football Record Book (PDF)
FCS: 36 – Steve Baggs, Bethune–Cookman, 2003
Div II: 37 – Charlie Cook, C. W. Post, 2001
Div III: 39 – Steven Wilson, King's (PA), 2002

==== Highest tackles for loss per game average, season ====
FBS: 2.77 – Kenny Philpot, Eastern Michigan, 2001
FCS: 3.00 – Steve Baggs, Bethune–Cookman, 2003
Div II: 3.1 – Charlie Cook, C.W. Post, 2001
Div III: 3.9 – Steven Wilson, King's (PA), 2001

==== Most tackles for loss, game ====
FBS: 8 – Nate Irving, North Carolina State vs. Wake Forest, Nov. 13, 2010
FCS: 8 – Sherrod Coates, Western Kentucky vs. Indiana State, Oct. 26, 2002
Div II: 9 – Darryl Wilson, Concord vs. West Virginia State, Oct. 8, 2005; Ron Ellington, Catawba vs. Mars Hill, Oct. 1, 2005
Div III: 9 1/2 – Ernest Wiggins, Husson vs. SUNY Maritime, Oct. 27, 2012

==== Most sacks, career ====
FBS: 46^{*} – Terrell Suggs, Arizona State, 2000–02, Javon Rolland-Jones, Arkansas State, 2014–17

FCS: 44 – Jonathan Petersen, University of San Diego, 2014–2017
Div II: 56 – Marcus Martin, Slippery Rock, 2014–17
Div III: 53 1/2 – Mike Czerwien, Waynesburg, 2002–04

^{*}Derrick Thomas (Alabama) and Tedy Bruschi (Arizona) each recorded 52 sacks, and Bruce Smith (Virginia Tech) recorded 46, but the NCAA did not start collecting official defensive statistics until 2000.

Hugh Green – University of Pittsburgh 53 career sacks 77–80

==== Highest sacks per game average, career ====
FBS: 1.61 – Dwight Freeney, Syracuse, 2000–01
FCS: 1.26 – Robert Mathis, Alabama A&M, 2000–02
Div II: 1.42 – Charlie Cook, C.W. Post, 2000–01
Div III: 1.53 – Steven Wilson, King's (PA), 2000–02

==== Most sacks, season ====
FBS: 24^{*}– Terrell Suggs, Arizona State, 2002
FCS: 21 – Chris McNeil, North Carolina A&T State, 1997
Div II: 25.5 – Caleb Murphy, Ferris State University 2022
Div III: 24 – Russ Watson, Worcester State, 2000

^{*}Ron Cox (Fresno State) recorded 28 sacks in 1989, but the NCAA did not start collecting official defensive statistics until 2000.

==== Highest sacks per game average, season ====
FBS: 1.71 – Terrell Suggs, Arizona State, 2002
FCS: 1.89 – Andrew Hollingsworth, Towson, 2000
Div II: 1.8 – Damien Gilyard, C.W. Post, 2004
Div III: 2.7 – Russ Watson, Worcester State, 2000

==== Most sacks, game ====
FBS: 6^{*} – Ameer Ismail, Western Michigan vs. Ball State, Oct. 21, 2006; Elvis Dumervil, Louisville vs. Kentucky, Sep. 4, 2005;
FCS: 6 – Damien Huren, Southeastern Louisiana vs. Northern Colorado, Oct. 9, 2004; Pat Dowd, University of Dayton vs. Drake University, Nov. 9, 2013
Div II: 7 – Ron Ellington, Catawba vs. Mars Hill, Oct. 1, 2005
Div III: 7 1/2 – Kevin McNamara, St. John's (MN) vs. Monmouth (IL), Nov. 19, 2005

^{*}Shay Muirbrook (BYU) recorded 6 sacks in the 1997 Cotton Bowl, but the NCAA did not start collecting official defensive statistics until 2000 and does not recognize bowl game statistics for any category prior to 2002.

== Special teams ==
=== Punting ===
==== Most punts, career ====
FBS: 337 – Alex Kinal, Wake Forest, 2012–15
FCS: 301 – Barry Bowman, Louisiana Tech, 1983–86
Div II: 328 – Dan Brown, Nicholls State, 1976–79
FBS G5: 291 – Payton Theisler, New Mexico State, 2016–19

==== Most punts, season ====
FBS: 101 – Jim Bailey, VMI, 1969
FCS: 117 – Tony Epperson, Weber State University, 2013
Div II: 98 – John Tassi, Lincoln (MO), 1981
Div III: 106 – Bob Blake, Wisconsin–Superior, 1977

==== Most punts, game ====
FBS: 36 – Charlie Calhoun, Texas Tech vs. Centenary (LA), Nov. 11, 1939
FCS: 16 – Matt Stover, Louisiana Tech vs. Louisiana–Monroe, Nov. 18, 1988
Div II: 32 – Jan Jones, Sam Houston State vs. Texas A&M–Commerce, Nov. 2, 1946
Div III: 17 – Jerry Williams, Frostburg State vs. Salisbury, Sep. 30, 1978

==== Highest punting average, career ====
FBS: 46.3 – Todd Sauerbrun, West Virginia, 1991–94 (150–199 punts); 47.8 – Ryan Stonehouse, Colorado State, 2017–21 (200–249 punts); 46.3 – Tory Taylor, Iowa, 2020–23 (min. 250 punts)
FCS: 44.8 – Mark Gould, Northern Arizona, 2000–03 (min. 150 punts)
Div II: 46.4 – Taylor Accardi, Colorado School of Mines, 2009–12
Div III: 43.4 – Jeff Shea, Cal Lutheran, 1994–97 (min. 100 punts)

==== Highest punting average, season ====
FBS: 51.19 – Matt Araiza, San Diego State, 2021 (min. 35 punts)
FCS: 48.2 – Mark Gould, Northern Arizona, 2002 (min. 60 punts)
Div II: 51.1 – Taylor Accardi, Colorado School of Mines, 2012 (min. 30 punts); 48.5 – Taylor Accardi, Colorado School of Mines, 2011 (min. 50 punts)
Div III: 46.5 – Andrew DiNardo, CUA, 2017 (min. 40 punts)

==== Highest punting average, game ====
FBS: 60.8 – Braden Mann, Texas A&M vs. Alabama, Sep. 22, 2018 (5–9 punts); 53.6 – Jim Benien, Oklahoma State vs. Colorado, Nov. 13, 1971 (min. 10 punts)
FCS: 61.5 – Eddie Johnson, Idaho State vs. Cal Poly, Nov. 16, 2002 (5–9 punts); 52.2 – Stuart Dodds, Montana State vs. Northern Arizona, Oct. 20, 1979 (min. 10 punts)
Div II: 57.5 – Tim Baer, Colorado Mines vs. Fort Lewis, Oct. 25, 1986 (min. 5 punts)
Div III: 58.4 – Danny Breslow, Kumeyaay vs. Tierrasanta, Nov. 1, 1999 (min. 6 punts)

==== Most punting yards, career ====
FBS: 13,911 – Alex Kinal, Wake Forest, 2012–15
FCS:
Div II: 10,780 – Jeff Williams, Adams State, 2002–2005 (min. 200 punts)
Div III: 8,531 – Nick Firth, Kean, 2018–2022

==== Most punting yards, season ====
FBS: 4,479 – Tory Taylor, Iowa, 2023
FCS: 3,313 - Victor Rodriguez, Stephen F. Austin State University, 2021
Div II: 3,686 - Luke Jones, New Mexico Highlands, 2016 (min. 70 punts)
Div III: 4,026 - Danny Breslow, DePortola, 2002

==== Most punting yards, game ====
FBS: 1,318 – Charlie Calhoun, Texas Tech vs. Centenary (LA) Nov. 11, 1939
FCS: 336 – Victor Rodriguez, Stephen F. State University vs. Sam Houston State University
Div II:
Div I:

==== Longest punt ====
FBS: 99 – Pat Brady, Nevada vs. Loyola Marymount, 1950
FCS: 93 – Tyler Grogan, Northeastern vs. Villanova, September 8, 2001
Div II: 97 – Earl Hurst, Emporia State. vs. Central Missouri, October 3, 1964
Div III: 95 – Austin Baker, Hiedelberg University vs. John Carroll University, November 3, 2018

=== Punt returns ===
==== Highest average gain per return, career ====
Minimum of 1.2 returns per game

FBS: 23.6 – Jack Mitchell, Oklahoma, 1946–48 (39 for 922)
FCS: 17.7 – LeRoy Vann, Florida A&M, 2006–09
Div II: 26.2 – Billy Johnson, Widener, 1971–72
Div III: 22.9 – Keith Winston, Knoxville, 1986–87

==== Highest average gain per return, season ====
Minimum of 1.2 returns per game

FBS: 28.5 – Maurice Jones-Drew, UCLA, 2005
FCS: 26.5 – Curtis DeLoatch, North Carolina A&T, 2001
Div II: 34.1 – Billy Johnson, Widener, 1972
Div III: 31.2 – Chuck Downey, Stony Brook, 1986

==== Highest average gain per return, game ====
FBS: 43.8 – Golden Richards, BYU vs. Texas, September 10, 1971 (min. 5 returns)
FCS: 43.2 – Ricky Pearsall, Northern Arizona vs. Western New Mexico, August 29, 1996 (min. 5 returns)
Div II: 66.3 – Billy Johnson, Widener vs. St. John's (NY), September 23, 1972 (min. 4 returns)
Div III:

==== Most punts returned, career ====
FBS: 153 – Vai Sikahema, BYU, 1980–82, 1984–85
FCS: 143 – Levander Segars, Montana, 2001–04
Div II: 153 – Armin Anderson, UC Davis, 1983–85
Div III: 134 – Marvin Deal, McDaniel, 1996–99

==== Most punts returned, game ====
FBS: 20 – Milton Hill, Texas Tech vs. Centenary (LA), November 11, 1939
FCS: 11 – Peter Athans, Sacred Heart vs. Siena, November 9, 2002
Div II: 12 – David Nelson, Ferris State vs. Northern Michigan, October 2, 1993
Div III: 10 – Ellis Wangelin, Wisconsin–River Falls vs. Wisconsin–Platteville, October 12, 1985

==== Most punts returned, season ====
FBS: 57 – Wes Welker, Texas Tech, 2002
FCS: 55 – Tommy Houk, Murray State, 1980
Div II: 61 – Armin Anderson, UC Davis, 1984
Div III: 48 – Rick Bealer, Lycoming, 1989

==== Most yards on punt returns, career ====
FBS: 1,762 – Wes Welker, Texas Tech, 2000–03
FCS: 1,668 – Marquay McDaniel, Hampton, 2002–05
Div II: 1,760 – Anthony Merritt, North Alabama, 2003–06
Div III: 2,002 – K.J. Miller, Mary Hardin-Baylor, 2017–2022

==== Most yards on punt returns, season ====
FBS: 791 – Lee Nalley, Vanderbilt, 1948
FCS: 698 – Khris Gardin, North Carolina A&T, 2015
Div II: 670 – Travis Lueck, North Dakota, 2003
Div III: 688 – Melvin Dillard, Ferrum, 1990

==== Most yards on punt returns, game ====
FBS: 277 – Antonio Perkins, Oklahoma vs. UCLA, Sep. 20, 2003
FCS: 227 – Leonard Goolsby, South Carolina State vs. Norfolk State, Oct. 11, 2003
Div II: 265 – Billy Johnson, Widener vs. St. John's (NY), Sep. 23, 1972
Div III: 278 – P. J. Williams, Mary Hardin–Baylor vs. Mississippi College, Oct. 1, 2005

==== Most touchdowns scored on punt returns, career ====
FBS: 9 — Dante Pettis, Washington, 2014–17
FCS: 8 — Junior Bergen, Montana, 2021–2024
FCS: 8 – LeRoy Vann, Florida A&M, 2006–09
Div II: 10 – James Rooths, Shepherd, 1997–2000
Div III: 7 – Chuck Downey, Stony Brook, 1984–87

==== Most touchdowns scored on punt returns, season ====
FBS: 6 — Ryan Switzer, North Carolina, 2013; Chad Owens, Hawaii, 2004
FCS: 5 – LeRoy Vann, Florida A&M, 2009; Curtis DeLoatch, North Carolina A&T, 2001
Div II: 5 – James Rooths, Shepherd, 1998
Div III: 5 – Chris McKinney, Guilford, 2001

==== Most touchdowns scored on punt returns, game ====
FBS: 3 – Antonio Perkins, Oklahoma vs. UCLA, Sep. 20, 2003
FCS: 3 – Zuriel Smith, Hampton vs. Virginia State, Sep. 22, 2001; Aaron Fix, Canisius vs. Siena, Sep. 24, 1994
Div II: 3 – Virgil Seay, Troy vs. West Alabama, Sep. 29, 1979; Billy Johnson, Widener vs. St. John's (NY), Sep. 23, 1972; Bobby Ahu, Hawaii vs. Linfield, Nov. 15, 1969; Tom Shockley, Adams State vs. Colo Mines, Nov. 14, 1970
Div III: 3 – John Conroy, Otterbein vs. Heidelberg, Nov. 1, 2003

=== Kickoff returns ===
==== Highest average gain per return, career ====
Minimum 1.2 returns per game

FBS: 35.1 – Anthony Davis, USC, 1972–74
FCS: 30.5 – Scotty McGee, James Madison, 2006–09
Div II: 34.0 – Glen Printers, Colorado State–Pueblo, 1973–74
Div III: 34.2 – Darnell Williams, Louisiana College, 2010–11

==== Highest average gain per return, season ====
Minimum 1.2 returns per game

FBS: 42.5 – Anthony Davis, USC, 1974
FCS: 37.3 – David Fraterrigo, Canisius, 1993
Div II: 41.7 – Richard Medlin, Fayetteville State, 2008
Div III: 48.5 – Darnell Williams, Louisiana College, 2010

==== Most kickoff returns, career ====
FBS: 144 – Troy Stoudermire, Minnesota, 2009–12
FCS: 191 – Terrence Holt, Austin Peay, 2007–10
Div II: 133 – Zack Page, Fairmont State, 2007–10
Div III: 132 – Chris Schubert, Oberlin, 2004–07

==== Most kickoff returns, season ====
FBS: 75 – Isaiah Burse, Fresno State, 2011
FCS: 52 – Terrence Holt, Austin Peay, 2009
Div II: 49 – Jason Washington, Pace, 2010
Div III: 54 – Jake Wilson, Allegheny, 2016

==== Most kickoff returns, game ====
FBS: 12 – Victor Bolden, Oregon State vs. Washington, Nov. 23, 2013
FCS: 12 – Eric Slenk, Valparaiso vs. Jacksonville, Oct. 16, 2010
Div II: 12 – Johnny Cox, Fort Lewis vs. Mesa State, Nov. 3, 1990
Div III: 14 – Arlie Myers, Nebraska Wesleyan vs. Morningside, Sep. 12, 2015

==== Most yards on kickoff returns, career ====
FBS: 3,615 – Troy Stoudermire, Minnesota, 2009–12
FCS: 4,683 – Terrence Holt, Austin Peay, 2007–10
Div II: 3,265 – Zack Page, Fairmont State, 2007–10
Div III: 2,867 – Chris Schubert, Oberlin, 2004–07

==== Most yards on kickoff returns, season ====
FBS: 1,606 – Isaiah Burse, Fresno State, 2011
FCS: 1,411 – David Primus, Samford, 1989
Div II: 1,234 – Justin Gallas, Colorado Mines, 2005
Div III: 1,268 – Jake Wilson, Allegheny, 2016

==== Most yards on kickoff returns, game ====
FBS: 319 – Leonard Johnson, Iowa State vs. Oklahoma State, Nov. 1, 2008
FCS: 333 – Colby Goodwyn, Old Dominion vs. Cal Poly, Oct. 9, 2010
Div II: 304 – L. J. McCray, Catawba vs. Tusculum, Nov. 6, 2010
Div III: 334 – Rashad Sims, Millsaps vs. East Texas Baptist, Sep. 27, 2014

==== Most touchdowns on kickoff returns, career ====
FBS: 7 – C. J. Spiller, Clemson, 2006–09; Tyron Carrier, Houston, 2008–11; Rashaad Penny, San Diego State University, 2014–17; Tony Pollard, Memphis, 2016–18
FCS: 6 – Jerome Mathis, Hampton, 2001–04
Div II: 10– Stephan Neville, Stonehill, 2008–11; Dave Ludy, Winona State, 1991–94
Div III: 10 – Larry Beavers, Wesley, 2004–05, 2007–08

==== Most touchdowns on kickoff returns, season ====
FBS: 5 – Ashlan Davis, Tulsa, 2004
FCS: 5 – Jerome Mathis, Hampton, 2004
Div II: 4 – Stephan Neville, Stonehill, 2010; Andrew Jackson, Merrimack, 2005
Div III: 5 – Larry Beavers, Wesley, 2008

==== Most touchdowns on kickoff returns, game ====
FBS: 2 – 22 times. Most recent: Brian Battie, South Florida vs. Houston, Nov. 6, 2021
FCS: 3 – Bashir Levingston, Eastern Washington vs. Sacramento State, Oct. 31, 1998
Div II: 2 – Seven times. Most recent: L. J. McCray, Catawba vs. Tusculum, Nov. 6, 2010
Div III: 2 – Many times. Most recent: Jamal Watkins, Birmingham–Southern vs. Huntingdon, Sep. 12, 2015

==== Most touchdowns scored on combined kick returns, career ====
Minimum one punt return and one kickoff return

FBS: 9 – Avery Williams, Boise State, 2017–20; Marcus Jones, Troy/Houston, 2017–21
Div II: 11 – Stephan Neville, Stonehill, 2008–11; Deante Steele, Shepherd, 2007–10
Div III: 13 – Larry Beavers, Wesley, 2004–05, 07–08

=== Field goals ===
==== Highest percentage of field goals made, career ====
FBS: 89.5% – Alex Henery, Nebraska, 2007–10 (min. 55 attempts)
FCS: 82.0% – Juan Toro, Florida A&M, 1995–98 (min. 50 attempts)
Div II: 80.8% – Jessup Pfeifer, Nebraska–Kearney, 2003–06 (min. 35 made)
Div III: 78.9% – Jeff Schebler, Wisconsin–Whitewater, 2006–09 (min. 50 attempts)

==== Most field goals made, career ====
FBS: 97 – Christopher Dunn, NC State, 2018–22
FCS: 101 – Ethan Ratke, James Madison, 2017–21
Div II: 82 – Jeff Glas, North Dakota, 2002–05
Div III: 75 – Jeff Schebler, Wisconsin–Whitewater, 2006–09

==== Most field goals made, season ====
FBS: 31 – Billy Bennett, Georgia, 2003
FCS: 29 – Adam Keller, North Dakota State, 2015
Div II: 30 – Jeff Glas, North Dakota, 2005
Div III: 27 – Edward Ruhnke, Mount Union, 2014

==== Most field goals made, game ====
FBS: 7 – Dale Klein, Nebraska vs. Missouri, Oct. 19, 1985; Mike Prindle, Western Michigan vs. Marshall, Sep. 29, 1984
FCS: 8 – Goran Lingmerth, Northern Arizona vs. Idaho, Oct. 25, 1986
Div II: 6 – Austin Wellock, Ashland vs. Wayne State (MI), Oct. 5, 2002; Steve Huff, Central Missouri. vs. Southeast Missouri State, Nov. 2, 1985; Cole Tracy, Assumption vs. LIU Post, Sep. 12, 2015;
Cole Tracy, Assumption vs. St. Anselm, Oct. 14, 2016
Div III: 6 – Jim Hever, Rhodes vs. Millsaps, Sep. 22, 1984

most field goals attempted and made both teams—9 of 11, Diamond NAU 4 for 4, Zendejas Nev Reno 5 for 7, Oct 1982

==== Most consecutive field goals made, career ====
FBS: 34 – Nick Sciba, Wake Forest, 2018–2019
FCS: 26 – Brian Mitchell, Northern Iowa, 1990–91
Div II: 26 – Ryne Smith, West Alabama, 2011–12; Will Rhody, Valdosta State, 2004
Div III:

==== Most consecutive field goals made, season ====
FBS: 25 – Graham Nicholson, Miami (OH), 2023; Chuck Nelson, Washington, 1982
FCS: 27 – Alex Thompson, Cal Poly, 2009
Div II: 19—Ryne Smith West Alabama 2010–2011 19 – Will Rhody, Valdosta State, 2004
Div III:

==== Longest field goal made ====
FBS (with tee): 67 – Russell Erxleben, Texas vs. Rice, Oct. 1, 1977; Steve Little, Arkansas vs. Texas, Oct. 15, 1977; Joe Williams, Wichita State vs. Southern Illinois, Oct. 21, 1978
FBS (without tee): 65 – Martín Gramática, Kansas State vs. Northern Illinois, Sept. 12, 1998
FCS: 63 – Scott Roper, Arkansas State vs. North Texas, Nov. 7, 1987; Tim Foley, Georgia Southern vs. James Madison, Nov. 7, 1987; Bill Gramática, South Florida vs. Austin Peay, Nov. 18, 2000
Div II: 67 – Tom Odle, Fort Hays State vs. Washburn, Nov. 5, 1988
Div III: 62 – Dom Antonini, Rowan vs. Salisbury, Sep. 18, 1976; Matthew Aven, Claremont-Mudd-Scripps vs. California Lutheran University, Oct. 19, 2013

Note: The longest field goal ever made in collegiate competition was 69 yards by Ove Johansson of Abilene Christian University, which at the time (1976) was competing as an NAIA, not an NCAA, school.

== NCAA players drafted into NFL by position ==
Among all colleges and universities, the following NCAA teams have the most players to reach the NFL by position:

- Quarterbacks: USC (17)
- Running backs: Nebraska (40)
- Wide receivers: Miami (FL) and USC (tied at 40 each)
- Tight ends: Notre Dame (21)
- Offensive linemen: Notre Dame (63)
- Defensive linemen: Miami (FL) (49)
- Linebackers: Penn State (58)
- Defensive backs: Ohio State (53)
