= Vogelbach =

Vogelbach may refer to:

- Daniel Vogelbach, baseball player
- Josh Vogelbach, American football player and coach
- Vogelbach, Bruchmühlbach-Miesau, Germany
