= Scott Pingel (American football) =

American football player (born 1977)

No. 10
- Position: Wide receiver

Personal information
- Born: May 9, 1977 (age 49)
- Listed height: 6 ft 1 in (1.85 m)
- Listed weight: 195 lb (88 kg)

Career information
- High school: St. Vincent
- College: Westminster College
- NFL draft: 2000: undrafted

Career history
- Black Hills Machine (2000); Buffalo Bills (2000)*; Rüsselsheim Razorbacks (2001); RiverCity Rage (2002–2005)
- * Offseason or practice squad member only

Awards and highlights
- 3× Division III All-American (1997–1999); Melberger Award (1999); SLIAC Conference Hall of Fame (2009)

Scott Pingel (born May 9, 1977) is an American former professional football wide receiver who holds multiple NCAA receiving records. He played college football at Westminster College. Pingel is the first player in NCAA history to accumulate over 2,000 receiving yards in a single season. Pingel is only one of two individuals to accomplish this feat. The 2,157 receiving yards Pingel totaled during the 1998 season remain an all-division NCAA single season record.

Pingel played professionally in the Indoor Football League, and overseas in the German Football League (GFL).

== Early life ==
Pingel attended St. Vincent High School in Perryville, Missouri where he played football and basketball. He was inducted into the school's hall of fame in 2016.

== College career ==
As a four year starter at Division III Westminster College, Pingel enjoyed a prolific career that would shatter several long-standing NCAA records. His most statistically successful year came during his junior season in 1998, during which he became the first NCAA player at any division to gain 2,000 receiving yards in a season. Pingel finished the year with 2,157 total receiving yards, which still stands as the all-time NCAA record. He remains only one of two players in NCAA history credited with this accomplishment. Trevor Insley of Nevada became the second player to accumulate over 2,000 single-season receiving yards in 1999.

During the first game of his senior season against Illinois College, Pingel caught the 302nd pass of his career. This broke Jerry Rice's all-division NCAA record of total career receptions. Pingel held this record from 1999 to 2011. It was surpassed by Michael Zweifel during the 2011 season.

At the conclusion of his career, Pingel owned the NCAA career records for total receptions (436), receiving yards (6,108) and receiving touchdowns (75). Future Super Bowl MVP Cooper Kupp broke Pingel's receiving yards record in 2016 while at Eastern Washington, while Dallas Mall of Division II Bentley surpassed the touchdown record in 2004.

Pingell was named a Division III All-American in three consecutive seasons. He was also named to the All-SLIAC second team in men's basketball in 1997 and 1998.

== Professional career ==
Pingel played indoor football with the Black Hills Machine where he was positioned at receiver and kicker. Although he had a workout for Denver Broncos scouts, Pingel was not selected in the 2000 NFL draft. The Buffalo Bills signed Pingel as an undrafted free agent. The Bills released Pingel on August 22, 2000.

In 2001, Pingel joined the German Football League's Rüsselsheim Razorbacks. He spent one season with the team, accumulating 107 receptions, 1,852 yards and 23 touchdowns in 16 games. He played in Germany with his former college record setting quarterback Justin Peery. The Razorbacks reached the GFL playoffs, losing in the quarterfinals.

Pingel joined the RiverCity Rage (then known as the Show-Me Believers) of the National Indoor Football League in 2002. He was named all conference receiver in three consecutive seasons. He held the league's record for receiving yards in a season and total receptions in a season. His #10 jersey was retired by the team in 2006.

== Coaching career ==
Pingel's coaching career began at his alma mater Westminster, initially as a graduate assistant and wide receiver coach. He would later become the team's offensive coordinator.

Pingel is currently the head football coach at Christian Brothers College High School and has held the position since 2008. He has led the school's football program to five Missouri state championships. Ahead of the 2022-23 school year, Pingel was promoted to athletic director at Christian Brothers College High School while retaining his position as the football team's head coach.

== Career accomplishments ==
=== Accolades ===
- 3x Division III All-American (1997-1999)
- SLIAC Football Offensive MVP (1997-1998)
- Melberger Award (1999)
- SLIAC Hall of Fame Inductee (2009)
- #10 retired by Westminster College football program

=== All-division NCAA statistical records ===
- Most yards receiving, season (2,157 in 1999)
- Highest receiving yards per game, season (215.7 in 1999)

=== Division III NCAA statistical records ===
- Most receiving touchdowns, career (75)
- Most yards receiving, career (6,108)
- Most receiving touchdowns, season (26, tied with Jack Phelan of Hartwick)

== See also ==
- List of NCAA football records
