= Craig Kusick =

American baseball player (1948–2006)

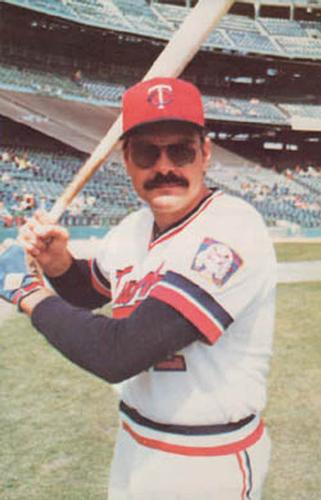
- First baseman / Designated hitter
- Born: September 30, 1948; Milwaukee, Wisconsin, U.S.
- Died: September 27, 2006 (aged 57); St. Paul, Minnesota, U.S.
- Batted: Right Threw: Right

MLB debut
- September 8, 1973, for the Minnesota Twins

Last MLB appearance
- September 30, 1979, for the Toronto Blue Jays

MLB statistics
- Batting average: .235
- Home runs: 46
- Runs batted in: 171
- Stats at Baseball Reference

Teams
- Minnesota Twins (1973–1979); Toronto Blue Jays (1979)

Craig Robert Kusick (September 30, 1948 – September 27, 2006) was an American professional baseball first baseman and designated hitter. He played in Major League Baseball for the Minnesota Twins and Toronto Blue Jays.

== Early life and amateur career ==
Born in Milwaukee, Wisconsin, Kusick grew up in the suburb of Greenfield. He attended Greenfield High School in Greenfield. Kusick attended the University of Wisconsin–La Crosse. He played college football as a wide receiver for the Wisconsin–La Crosse Eagles. After getting cut from the school's baseball team as a freshman, he joined the school's track and field team. He had a .307 batting average in three seasons with the school's baseball team.

== Professional career ==
He was signed by the Twins in 1970. He broke in with the team in September 1973, and gradually took over first base duties from Harmon Killebrew, but was primarily used as a DH from 1976 to 1978 when Rod Carew was moved over from second base. On August 27, 1975, Kusick tied a major league record by being hit by pitches three times in an 11-inning game against the Milwaukee Brewers. His career peaked with a 1977 season in which he batted .254 with 12 home runs and 45 runs batted in. After hitting .173 in 1978, and posting a .241 mark through 24 games in 1979, his contract was sold to the Toronto Blue Jays in midseason. He hit .204 in 24 more games with the Blue Jays before being released after the season. Kusick subsequently signed with the San Diego Padres but never made it back to the major leagues.

Kusick ended his career with a .235 batting average, 46 HRs, 171 RBI, 291 hits, 155 runs and 11 stolen bases in 497 games. In his brief stint with Toronto he also made one appearance as a relief pitcher in a 24–2 blowout loss against the California Angels, allowing three hits and two runs in 3 2/3 innings for a 4.91 earned run average.

Kusick later was named baseball coach at Rosemount High School in Rosemount, Minnesota from 1982 to 2004. Seven of his teams played in the state tournament.

== Personal life ==
A resident of Apple Valley, Minnesota, Kusick died of leukemia on September 27, 2006, three days before his 58th birthday, in St. Paul. He died nine months after his wife Sarabeth died of ovarian cancer; they had two children.

His son, Craig Kusick Jr., led Wisconsin–LaCrosse to the 1995 Division III football championship as a quarterback, received the Melberger Award as the top Division III player, and later played in the Arena Football League.
