= Fred Tyler =

American swimmer and coach

Freddie Tyler
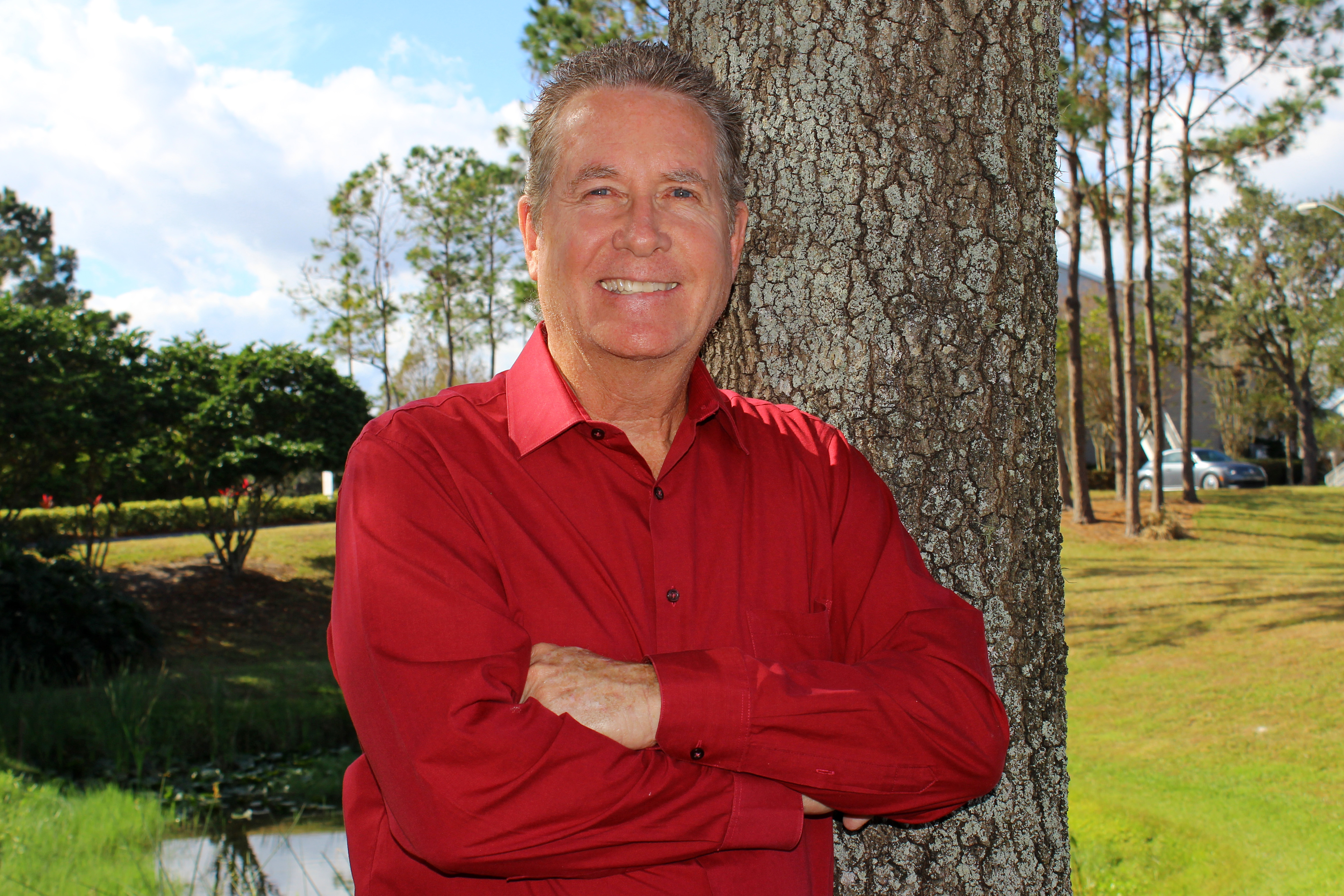

Personal information
- Full name: Frederick Daniel Tyler
- Nickname: "Freddie"
- National team: United States
- Born: March 15, 1954 (age 72) Orlando, Florida, U.S.
- Height: 5 ft 11 in (1.80 m)
- Weight: 165 lb (75 kg)

Sport
- Sport: Swimming
- Strokes: Freestyle
- Club: Canada Dry JETS Swim Team
- College team: Indiana University (IU)
- Coach: James Counsilman (IU)
Medal record
Men's swimming
Representing the United States
Olympic Games
Gold medal – first place	1972 Munich	4x200 m freestyle relay

Frederick Daniel Tyler (born March 15, 1954) is an American competitive swimmer and aquatics coach, winner of several high school and college championships and a gold medal in the 4×200-meter freestyle relay at the 1972 Summer Olympics and author.

== High school ==
Tyler began his high school swimming at St. Andrews School, in Boca Raton, Florida, where in 1969 and 1970 he won the 400-yard freestyle and 200-yard individual medley (IM) at the state high school championships. He then attended The Bolles School, a prep school in Jacksonville, Florida, where he swam for the Bolles high school swim team. At the 1971 state championship meet, he was first in the 200- and 400-yard freestyle, and in 1972 won the 100-yard freestyle and 200-yard individual medley. Tyler remains one of only seven swimmers to win the Florida state swim championship in two different events for three separate years. He graduated from The Bolles School in 1972. Tyler was the first swimmer to earn All American honors in every individual event. He achieves this feat 3 straight years.

== Indiana University ==
Tyler, along with John Kinsella, Mark Spitz and Gary Hall, Sr., was a member of coach James Counsilman's standout Indiana Hoosiers swim team at Indiana University, which dominated men's college swimming in the early 1970s. During his college career, beginning in the Fall of 1972, Tyler's Indiana teams were Big Ten Conference champions for four consecutive years and NCAA national champions in 1972 and 1973. In 1975, Tyler was the NCAA individual national champion in the 200-yard individual medley (time of 1:50:658), and his 800-yard freestyle relay finished first in the NCAA finals in 1973, 1974 and 1975. Tyler won Big 10 Conference titles in the 200 Individual Medley in 1974, 1975, and 1976, and in 1974 and 1976 also won the 200 Butterfly title, for a total of five Big 10 conference titles. He closed out his time as a Hoosier swimmer as one of the best swimmers in the history of the program, receiving 14 career All-America honors. Freddie was inducted into the Indiana University Athletic Hall of Fame on October 28, 2016.

== 1972 Munich Olympics ==
In spite of the terrorist attacks against the Israeli athletes, some of the most spectacular events at the 1972 Summer Olympics in Munich were in swimming, where Mark Spitz won seven Olympic titles with seven world records. On August 29, 1972, Tyler finished 5th in finals of 200 meter freestyle with a time of 1:54.96, missing Indiana teammate Mark Spitz's world record time by 2.18 seconds, yet still feeling somewhat disappointed with his ranking.

On August 31, 1972, the American 4 × 200 meter freestyle relay of John Kinsella, Fred Tyler, Steve Genter and Mark Spitz set a World & Olympic record at 7:35:78, eclipsing the record set earlier that day by the USA team in the semifinal heat, and winning the Olympic gold medal. Tyler became one of the youngest American male gold medalists in swimming at that year's Olympics. The victory was all the more remarkable in that Spitz swam in the 4x200 relay only one hour after his world record victory in the 100 meter butterfly, and Genter had been released from the hospital only a few days before, following surgery for a collapsed lung. Tyler swam his leg in a time of 1:54.32. The combined American time was a full 17 seconds faster than the American time in the event at the 1968 Mexico City Olympics.

== Coaching ==
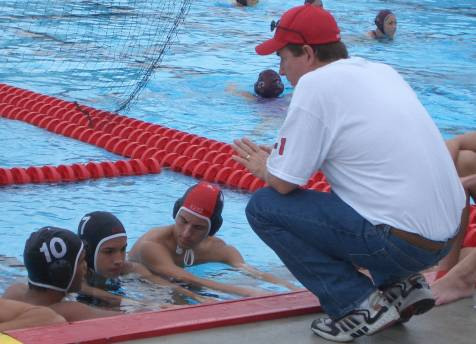
Tyler coaching water polo

Tyler began coaching swimming and water polo at West Orange High School in Winter Garden, Florida, from 1980 to 1985. He coached at Mount Dora High School from 1986 through 1989. He was head aquatics coach at Lake Mary High School in Lake Mary, Florida, from 1990 until his retirement in 2015. He coached the Lake Mary Rams to a second-place finish in 2004 and fourth place in 2005 at the Florida state swimming championships. Tyler's boys' water polo team reached the 2005 state quarter finals, and the girls' the state 2005 semis and the 2007 quarter finals. In 2004-05, Fred Tyler was recognized as both the Seminole Athletic Conference and Florida State 3A Coach of Year.

Tyler coached gold medal winner Brad Bridgewater (200-meter backstroke at 1996 Summer Games), who attended Lake Mary High School from 1987 to 1990. Tyler taught social studies and mathematics to exceptional education students and Algebra and Geometry to Regular education students during his time at Lake Mary.

== Author ==
Published Homesick - The Novel in March 2018

== See also ==
- List of Indiana University (Bloomington) people
- List of Olympic medalists in swimming (men)
- World record progression 4 × 200 metres freestyle relay
