= Jason Boltus =

American gridiron football player and coach (born 1986)

No. 16, 2, 17
- Position: Quarterback

Personal information
- Born: August 21, 1986 (age 40); Baldwinsville, New York, U.S.
- Listed height: 6 ft 3 in (1.91 m)
- Listed weight: 225 lb (102 kg)

Career information
- High school: Charles W. Baker (Baldwinsville)
- College: Hartwick College
- NFL draft: 2009: undrafted

Career history

Playing
- Hamilton Tiger-Cats (2009–2011); Spokane Shock (2012); Omaha Nighthawks (2012); Utah Blaze (2013); Winnipeg Blue Bombers (2013); Orlando Predators (2014); Tampa Bay Storm (2015–2016); Jacksonville Sharks (2017)

Coaching
- Mount Dora (FL) H.S. (2014) Quarterbacks; Ocoee (FL) H.S. (2015–2016) Offensive coordinator & quarterbacks; Ocoee (FL) H.S. (2017–present) Head coach

Awards and highlights
- NAL champion (2017); AFL passing yards leader (2015); E8 Rookie of the Year (2005); ECAC D-III Northwest Rookie of the Year (2005); E8 Offensive Player of the Year (2007–2008); Melberger Award (2007); ECAC D-III Northwest Player of the Year (2008); All-ECAC D-III Northwest (2008); Second-team Little All-American (2008); NCAA D-III career total offense leader (14,231)

Career CFL statistics
- Comp–Att: 13–40
- Passing yards: 139
- TD–INT: 0–3
- Passer rating: 12.4
- Stats at CFL.ca (archived)

Career AFL statistics
- Comp–Att: 955–1,659
- Passing yards: 11,834
- TD–INT: 225–56
- Passer rating: 99.62
- Rushing touchdowns: 25
- Stats at ArenaFan.com

Jason Boltus (born August 21, 1986) is an American former professional football quarterback. Boltus was signed as a street free agent by the Hamilton Tiger-Cats of the Canadian Football League (CFL) in 2009. He played Division III college football for the Hartwick Hawks, where he was also the team's punter.

== College career ==
Boltus attended University at Albany, SUNY after graduation from high school, where he continued his football career. He red-shirted as a true freshman, but transferred to Hartwick College. As a junior in 2007, Boltus won the Melberger Award as the nation's top NCAA Division III player.

== Professional career ==
Prior to the 2009 NFL draft, Boltus was projected to be undrafted by NFLDraftScout.com. He was rated as the 22nd-best quarterback in the draft.

Pre-draft measurables
Height	Weight	40-yard dash	10-yard split	20-yard split	20-yard shuttle	Three-cone drill	Vertical jump	Broad jump	Bench press
6 ft 3 in (1.91 m)	225 lb (102 kg)	4.82 s	1.53 s	2.76 s	4.47 s	7.00 s	31.5 in (0.80 m)	9 ft 3 in (2.82 m)	26 reps
All values from 2009 NFL Scouting Combine

Boltus retired after the 2016 season. On June 7, 2017, he signed with the Jacksonville Sharks of the National Arena League (NAL). He played in 2 games, starting 1, in 2017, completing 17 of 38 passes for 196 yards, 5 touchdowns and 0 interceptions. He also scored one rushing touchdown. He started the final game of the regular season in order to give starter Damien Fleming some rest before the playoffs.

== Coaching career ==
In 2014, Boltus became the quarterbacks coach at Mount Dora High School in Mount Dora, Florida. In 2015, Boltus became the offensive coordinator and quarterbacks coach at Ocoee High School in Ocoee, Florida. In March 2017, Boltus was named the new head coach at Ocoee High School.

== Personal life ==
His younger brother Jeremy, a 2011 United States Military Academy graduate, plays lacrosse for the Denver Outlaws of Major League Lacrosse. He has a twin brother, Jeffrey, who played lacrosse at SUNY Cortland and now coaches football for West Genesee High School in Camillus, New York. He is married to Amanda Barton, a teacher at Sorrento Elementary
