= Mount Dora High School =

Coordinates: 28°48′10″N 81°38′13″W

Location
- 700 North Highland St; Mount Dora, Florida 32757; United States

Information
- Type: Public High School
- Motto: We are One Team!
- Founded: 1922
- Principal: Kyle Bracewell
- Faculty: 118
- Grades: 9-12
- Enrollment: 1,228
- Campus: Suburban
- Colors: Orange & white
- Athletics: Florida High School Athletic Association
- Mascot: Hurricanes
- Website: mdh.lake.k12.fl.us/o/mdh

Mount Dora High School is a high school located in Mount Dora, Florida. It serves grades 9 to 12. The total enrollment of the high school is 1,228.

== Expansion ==
In 1960, the former Roseborough Elementary School building became part of Mount Dora High School.

== Athletics ==
The Hurricanes are the name of the athletic teams from the high school. Luke Hutchinson is the current coach of the football team. Dan Spear was the winningest football coach in Mount Dora High School's history.

Mount Dora Hurricanes won 20 games in a row from 1950 to 1952 and won Central Florida Conference titles in all three years. In 1959 they won the conference title again.

== Vocations ==
Mount Dora High School's Air Force JROTC unit has won the Silver Star Community Service award multiple times, most recently in 2021.

Mount Dora High School's band performed at a least a few Mount Dora Day events when the events were still held.

== Select history ==
In January 2018, a student at Mount Dora High School threatened to shoot people and he was subsequently arrested and charged for the incident.

== Notable faculty-coaches ==
- Fred Tyler - won a gold medal in the 1972 Summer Olympics in the 4×200-meter freestyle relay, he was the swimming coach at Mount Dora High School in the late 1980s
- Jason Boltus - former professional football player, he was the quarterbacks coach at Mount Dora High School in 2014
