= 1995 Wisconsin–La Crosse Eagles football team =

American college football season

1995 Wisconsin–La Crosse Eagles football

NCAA Division III national champion WSUC champion

Stagg Bowl, W 36–7 vs. Rowan
- Conference: Wisconsin State University Conference
- Record: 14–0 (7–0 WSUC)
- Head coach: Roger Harring (27th season)
- Home stadium: Veterans Memorial Stadium

1995 Wisconsin State University Conference football standings
	Conf.					Overall
Team	W		L		T	W		L		T
Wisconsin–La Crosse $^	7	–	0	–	0	14	–	0	–	0
Wisconsin–River Falls ^	6	–	1	–	0	9	–	3	–	0
Wisconsin–Stevens Point	5	–	2	–	0	8	–	2	–	0
Wisconsin–Whitewater	4	–	3	–	0	7	–	3	–	0
Wisconsin–Platteville	3	–	4	–	0	5	–	5	–	0
Wisconsin–Oshkosh	2	–	5	–	0	5	–	5	–	0
Wisconsin–Stout	1	–	6	–	0	3	–	7	–	0
Wisconsin–Eau Claire	0	–	7	–	0	1	–	9	–	0
$ – Conference champion; ^ – NCAA Division III playoff participant

The 1995 Wisconsin–La Crosse Eagles football team was an American football team that represented the University of Wisconsin–La Crosse as a member of the Wisconsin State University Conference (WSUC) during the 1995 NCAA Division III football season. In their 27th year under head coach Roger Harring, the Eagles compiled a 14–0 record (7–0 in conference game) and won the WSUC championship. They participated in the NCAA Division III playoffs, defeating Concordia–Moorhead in the regionals, Wisconsin–River Falls in the quarterfinals, Mount Union in the semifinals, and Rowan in the Stagg Bowl to win the Division III national championship.

Senior quarterback Craig Kusick Jr. threw for 3,284 yards and 32 touchdowns and won the Melberger Award, the Division III version of the Heisman Trophy awarded to the top player among the 199 schools competing in Division III. Five La Crosse players received first-team honors on the All-WSUC football team: Kusick at quarterback; Paul Kling at wide receiver; Mike Ivey at defensive line; Mike Maslowski at linebacker; and John Barrett at return specialist.

The team played its home games at Veterans Memorial Stadium in La Crosse, Wisconsin.

== Schedule ==
Date	Opponent	Site	Result	Attendance	Source
September 2	at Loras*	Rock Bowl; Dubuque, IA	W 34–0	3,000	
September 9	at Winona State*	Maxwell Field; Winona, MN	W 31–23	3,514	
September 16	Drake*	Veterans Memorial Stadium; La Crosse, WI	W 14–7	4,167	
September 30	Wisconsin–Oshkosh	Veterans Memorial Stadium; La Crosse, WI	W 44–0	2,462	
October 7	at Wisconsin–Platteville	Ralph E. Davis Pioneer Stadium; Platteville, WI	W 33–0	1,906	
October 14	at Wisconsin–River Falls	Ramer Field; River Falls, WI	W 14–13	3,000	
October 21	Wisconsin–Stevens Point	Veterans Memorial Stadium; La Crosse, WI	W 25–15	4,639	
October 28	Wisconsin–Stout	Veterans Memorial Stadium; La Crosse, WI	W 56–0	1,235	
November 3	at Wisconsin–Eau Claire	Carson Park; Eau Claire, WI	W 30–13	1,000	
November 11	Wisconsin–Whitewater	Veterans Memorial Stadium; La Crosse, WI	W 45–14	3,080	
November 18	vs. Concordia–Moorhead*	Fargodome; Fargo, ND (NCAA Division III first round)	W 45–7	2,000	
November 25	Wisconsin-River Falls*	Veterans Memorial Stadium; La Crosse, WI (NCAA Division III quarterfinal)	W 28–14	2,816	
December 2	at Mount Union*	Mount Union Stadium; Alliance, OH (NCAA Division III semifinal)	W 20–17	5,500	
December 9	vs. Rowan	Salem Football Stadium; Salem, VA (Stagg Bowl—NCAA Division III championship game)	W 36–7	4,905	
*Non-conference game
