= Germaine Race =

American football player (born 1985)

No. 16
- Position: Running back

Personal information
- Born: April 7, 1985 (age 41); Kansas City, Missouri, U.S.
- Listed height: 5 ft 10 in (1.78 m)
- Listed weight: 218 lb (99 kg)

Career information
- High school: Warrensburg (MO)
- College: Pittsburg State
- NFL draft: 2007: undrafted

Career history
- San Diego Chargers (2007); St. Pölten Invaders (2010)

Awards and highlights
- 3× Consensus All-American (2004–2006); 2× MIAA Offensive MVP (2005–2006); 3× First-team All-MIAA (2004–2006)

Germaine Race (born April 7, 1985) is an American former professional football running back. He was originally signed by the San Diego Chargers as an undrafted free agent in 2007. He played college football at Pittsburg State, earning All-American honors three times. Race played professionally in Austrian Football League (AFL) in 2010.

== Early life ==
Race attended Warrensburg High School in Warrensburg, Missouri, and was a student and a letterman in football. In football, he was a two-year starter. As a senior, Race rushed for 2,069 yards and 29 touchdowns and was a first-team Missouri Class 4A All-State selection. As a junior, Race rushed for 1,785 yards and 19 touchdowns. Race was released by the Chargers on 6/20/08.

== College career ==
Germaine Race finished his decorated career at Pittsburg State as one of the elite running backs in NCAA Division II history. Race garnered first-team All-America honors in each of his final three seasons for the Gorillas (2004–06) and he was named MIAA Offensive MVP his last two seasons. As a junior in 2005, he set a Division II record with 33 touchdowns and finished fourth in the Harlon Hill Trophy race. In 2006, he rushed for 1,944 yards and 31 TDs, finishing third in the Harlon Hill Trophy vote. Race set the Division II all-time rushing record with 6,985 yards as well as the NCAA all division touchdowns record with 107 which was later tied by Danny Woodhead, and broken by Nate Kmic.

In 2016, Race was inducted to the Pittsburg State Hall of Fame.

== Professional (Austrian Football League) ==
Race played 2010 for the St. Pölten Generali Invaders in Austria, where he was the top touchdown scorer of the 2010 season in the Austrian Football League. He was also named the 2010 Austrian Football League Offensive Player of the Year.
