= Craig Kusick Jr. =

American football player (born 1973)

Profile
- Position: Quarterback

Personal information
- Born: June 28, 1973 (age 53); Apple Valley, Minnesota, U.S.
- Listed height: 6 ft 6 in (1.98 m)
- Listed weight: 240 lb (109 kg)

Career information
- College: Wisconsin–La Crosse
- NFL draft: 1996: undrafted

Career history
- San Francisco 49ers (1996)*; Milwaukee Mustangs (1997); Grand Rapids Rampage (1999–2000); Milwaukee Mustangs (2001)
- * Offseason or practice squad member only

Awards and highlights
- Second-team All-Arena (1999); NCAA Division III national champion (1995); Melberger Award (1995)

Career AFL statistics
- Comp. / Att.: 588 / 917
- Passing yards: 6604
- TD–INT: 113–17
- Passer rating: 108.61
- Rushing TDs: 10
- Stats at ArenaFan.com

Craig Robert Kusick Jr. (born June 28, 1973) is an American former football quarterback in the Arena Football League. He played four seasons, two for the Milwaukee Mustangs (1997, 2001) and two for the Grand Rapids Rampage (1999–2000). He was named second-team All-Arena in 1999. He attended the University of Wisconsin–La Crosse, where in 1995 he led his team to the Division III championship and won the Melberger Award as the top player in Division III.

Kusick is the son of former Major League Baseball player Craig Kusick.
