= Goran Lingmerth =

Swedish gridiron football player (born 1964)

Profile
- Position: Kicker

Personal information
- Born: November 11, 1964 (age 61); Nässjö, Sweden
- Listed height: 5 ft 8 in (1.73 m)
- Listed weight: 160 lb (73 kg)

Career information
- College: Northern Arizona
- NFL draft: 1987: undrafted

Career history
- Philadelphia Eagles (1987)*; Cleveland Browns (1987)
- * Offseason or practice squad member only
- Stats at Pro Football Reference

Goran R. Lingmerth (born November 11, 1964, in Nässjö, Sweden) is a former professional American football player; a placekicker for the Cleveland Browns in 1987. He played college football at Northern Arizona University in Flagstaff.

== After football ==
After a season in the NFL, Lingmerth completed his degree at NAU and then worked in the golf industry for Ping.

== Personal life ==
Lingmerth's first wife was professional golfer Heather Farr, who died of cancer at age 28. His nephew is PGA Tour player David Lingmerth.
