= Melberger Award =

- Awarded for: outstanding U.S. college football player in Division III
- Country: United States
- Presented by: Diversified Information Technologies

History
- First award: 1993
- Final award: 2011

The Melberger Award was given annually to the most outstanding U.S. college football player in Division III of the National Collegiate Athletic Association. The award was named after Clifford Melberger, a captain of the 1960 Bucknell University football team, and is presented by Diversified Information Technologies, which Mr. Melberger leads as president.

The Melberger had been one of two awards given to Division III football players, the other being the better-known Gagliardi Trophy. The focus of the two awards has historically been slightly different. The Gagliardi factors in community service, academics, and athletics; the Melberger is, at least theoretically, presented to the best athlete. In recent years the Melberger has fallen into disfavor due to poor publicity and coordination by the firm which now sponsors the award. From the period 2002–2004, the award was given not to the nation's most outstanding Division III football players, but to the player in the local region who could attend (at their own cost) the awards ceremony in Wilkes-Barre, Pennsylvania. This resulted in the award being given to players who would often struggle to make an all-region team, let alone be named the best player in the country. Prior to 2002, the Melberger Award was funded and supported by the Downtown Wilkes-Barre Touchdown Club. The award was last given in 2011.

== Winners ==
Year	Winner	Pos	School
1993	Jim Ballard	QB	Mount Union
1994	Carey Bender	RB	Coe
1995	Craig Kusick Jr.	QB	UW–La Crosse
1996	Bill Borchert	QB	Mount Union
1997	Bill Borchert (2)	QB	Mount Union
1998	Mike Burton	QB	Trinity (TX)
1999	Scott Pingel	WR	Westminster (MO)
2000	R. J. Bowers	RB	Grove City
2001	Chuck Moore	RB	Mount Union
2002	Daniel Pincelli	QB	Hartwick
2003	Brett Trichilo (2)	RB	Wilkes
2004	Brett Trichilo (2)	RB	Wilkes
2005	Brett Elliott	QB	Linfield
2006	Chris Sharpe	QB	Springfield
2007	Jason Boltus	QB	Hartwick
2008	Nate Kmic	RB	Mount Union
2009	Alex Tanney	QB	Monmouth (IL)
2010	Ben McLaughlin	QB	Louisiana College
2011	Greg Cordivari	QB	Catholic University
