= Josh Vogelbach =

American football player and coach (born 1986)

Profile
- Position: Quarterback

Personal information
- Born: February 24, 1986 (age 40)
- Listed height: 5 ft 11 in (1.80 m)
- Listed weight: 210 lb (95 kg)

Career information
- High school: Bishop Verot (Fort Myers, FL)
- College: East Carolina (2004); Guilford (2005–2008)

Josh Vogelbach (born February 24, 1986) is an American former football player and current coach. While attending Guilford College, he set the NCAA Division III career record with 13,605 passing yards.

== Early life ==
Vogelabach is a native of Fort Myers, Florida. He attended Bishop Verot High School, where he passed for 6,243 yards and 60 touchdowns.

== College ==
Vogelbach began his college career at East Carolina, where he was redshirted in 2004. He transferred to Guilford College in 2005. He played at the quarterback position for Guilford College from 2005 to 2008. He holds several NCAA Division III records, including most passes attempted in a career (1,982), most plays in a career (2,240), and most yards gained by a freshman (3,549). At the time of his graduation, he also held the Division III career record for passing yardage (13,605), a total that currently ranks second in Division III history. He also ranks fourth in Division III history with 13,904 yards of total offense. On September 26, 2006, he compiled a career-high 592 passing yards and six passing touchdowns, completing 46 of 63 passes. He was rated the 96th best quarterback in the 2009 NFL draft by NFLDraftScout.com.

== Later life ==
After graduating from Guilford, he signed to play with the Bloomington Extreme of the Indoor Football League for the 2009 season. He was released by the Extreme before the start of the season. In January 2017, he was promoted to head football coach at his alma mater Bishop Verot High School. In December 2019, he was replaced as head coach by John Mohring, but remained employed as an offensive coordinator.

== See also ==
- List of NCAA football records
