= Danny Woodhead =

American football player (born 1985)

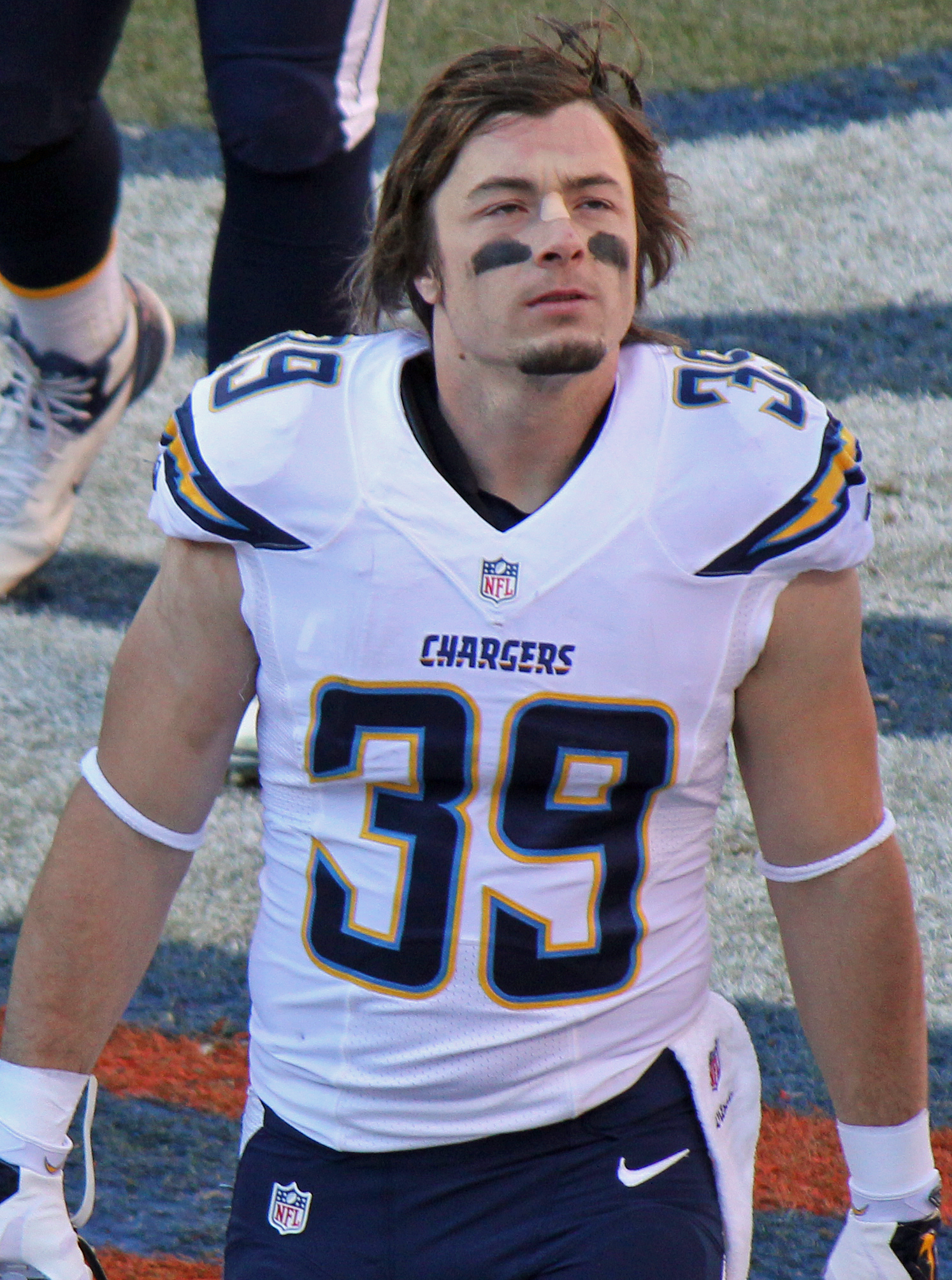
- Woodhead with the San Diego Chargers in 2014

No. 83, 27, 22, 39
- Position: Running back

Personal information
- Born: January 25, 1985 (age 41); North Platte, Nebraska, U.S.
- Listed height: 5 ft 8 in (1.73 m)
- Listed weight: 204 lb (93 kg)

Career information
- High school: North Platte (NE)
- College: Chadron State (2004–2007)
- NFL draft: 2008: undrafted

Career history
- New York Jets (2008–2010); New England Patriots (2010–2012); San Diego Chargers (2013–2016); Baltimore Ravens (2017)

Awards and highlights
- 2× Harlon Hill Trophy (2006, 2007); 3× RMAC Offensive Player of the Year (2005–2007); RMAC Offensive Freshman of the Year (2004); 4× First-team All-RMAC (2004–2007)

Career NFL statistics
- Rushing attempts: 517
- Rushing yards: 2,238
- Rushing touchdowns: 15
- Receptions: 300
- Receiving yards: 2,698
- Receiving touchdowns: 17
- Stats at Pro Football Reference
- College Football Hall of Fame

Daniel Jacob Henry Woodhead (born January 25, 1985) is an American amateur golfer and former professional football player. He played college football as a running back for the Chadron State Eagles and was signed by the New York Jets of the National Football League (NFL) as an undrafted free agent in 2008. He also played for the New England Patriots, San Diego Chargers and Baltimore Ravens.

Woodhead set several NCAA college football rushing records, including the single season rushing and all-time rushing records. In 2006 and 2007, he won the Harlon Hill Trophy, awarded to the best player in NCAA Division II, making him the third player to win the trophy twice in its history. On October 6, 2007, Woodhead became the NCAA all-time, all-division leading rusher. Woodhead held this record until it was broken by Mount Union running back Nate Kmic on December 13, 2008. With the Patriots, Woodhead made his lone Super Bowl appearance in 2011. He finished the game with four catches for 42 yards and a touchdown while rushing seven times for 18 yards, but the Patriots fell to the New York Giants 21–17.

After his football career, he became a golfer, qualifying for United States Golf Association championship tournaments.

== Early life ==
Woodhead played football at North Platte High School in North Platte, Nebraska, where he broke many records. North Platte reached the state finals in 2001, with Woodhead's help after beating Millard North High School team 24–21. Woodhead blocked a field goal attempt late in the fourth quarter to give North Platte possession with only minutes left. North Platte's Ben Woodhead, Woodhead's older brother, threw a pass down field to set up a game-winning field goal by Jake McCarthy. However, North Platte went on to lose the state championship 28–14 to Millard West High School.

In Woodhead's junior season, his team went 8–1 in the regular season, and won two games in the playoffs before falling to Millard North in the semifinals.

In Woodhead's senior season, North Platte had its first undefeated regular season in 40 years, going 9–0. The team went on to beat Omaha North High School in the first round of the playoffs, Bellevue East in the second round, and finally lost to Millard North 21–7 in the semifinals for the second year in a row. Woodhead finished as Nebraska's Class A leading rusher, as well as Nebraska's Class A all-time leading rusher with 4,891 yards (2000–2003). North Platte High's quarterback that year, Derek Enderle, also finished as the state's leading passer. This marked the first time in North Platte's history that the football team finished with the state's leading passer and rusher in the same season.

In addition to being a star in football, Woodhead was also a four-year letterman in three other sports; in track & field, he broke the school record after sprinting 10.5 seconds in the 100-meter dash; in basketball, he once scored 47 points in a game; and in soccer, he netted 16 goals in a season.

== College career ==
In 2004, Woodhead began attending Chadron State College in Chadron, Nebraska, where he rushed for 1,840 yards as a freshman. Woodhead was the first recipient of a full athletic scholarship at Chadron State in its 96-year history.

In 2005, Woodhead carried the ball 278 times for 1,769 yards, averaging 6.4 yards per carry, and 21 touchdowns. He also had 30 receptions for 367 yards, averaging 12.2 yards per reception.

In 2006, through 12 games, Woodhead rushed for 2,740 yards, a new all-division single season rushing record, surpassing Kavin Gaillaird. Including the playoffs, his rushing yards in 2006 totaled 2,756. He also led his team to the NCAA Division II playoffs in 2006, losing to Northwest Missouri State. Northwest Missouri State managed to hold Woodhead to a season low 16 yards rushing on 16 carries while giving up 79 yards receiving, which was more than double anyone on the Northwest Missouri team. Chadron also had 327 yards of total offense compared to Northwest Missouri State's 306.

Through 39 games, Woodhead's 606 points equated to 15.5 points a game, the highest ever in NCAA Division II. Only Dan Pugh of Mount Union College, a Division III school in Alliance, Ohio, with 248 points in 2002 and Barry Sanders of Oklahoma State with 234 in 1988, had ever scored more points in a season than Woodhead scored in 2006. However, in 2007 Abilene Christian University's Bernard Scott broke Woodhead's Division II record by scoring 39 touchdowns (234 points).

Woodhead accumulated 7,441 yards on the ground, for his career, giving him a career average of 190.8 yards per game. He rushed for more than 200 yards in 19 of his 39 appearances and scored in 37 consecutive games, both of which are NCAA all-division records.

After a 208-yard game against Western New Mexico in 2007, he became college football's all-time leading rusher, breaking the record previously held by R.J. Bowers, who played for Grove City College, a Division III school in Pennsylvania from 1997 to 2000. Nate Kmic broke the all division record with 8,074 for Mount Union College. Woodhead is also just the sixth NCAA Division II player to rush for more than 1,000 yards in four seasons.

He recorded 9,259 all-purpose yards, which ranked second on the NCAA all-time list at the time of his college career ending.

Woodhead is also tied with Germaine Race (Pittsburg State 2003–2006) for first place in Division II in career scoring with 654 points on 109 touchdowns. Woodhead is only the second player in collegiate history to score more than 100 touchdowns. Nate Kmic set the new all-time record in 2009, finishing his career with 130 touchdowns for Mount Union College.

Barry Sanders is the only college player to accumulate more all-purpose yards than the 3,159 that Woodhead gained in 2006, as he gained 3,250 as a junior at Oklahoma State University in 1988, when he won the Heisman Trophy. Woodhead ranked 10th in Division II in career all-purpose yards with 7,349 after his junior season. The Division II leader is Brian Shay of Emporia State with 9,301 yards, including 1,207 on kickoff returns, 1995–1998.

Woodhead was a Harlon Hill Trophy candidate in 2004, 2005, 2006, and 2007, winning the award in both 2006 and 2007.

When interviewed, Woodhead stated that Nebraska never showed much interest in him and that he wanted to go somewhere where he was wanted. Chadron State showed a lot of interest in him, which is where he ended up. While at Chadron State, he majored in math education.

== Professional career ==
=== Pre-draft ===
Pre-draft measurables
Height	Weight	40-yard dash	10-yard split	20-yard split	20-yard shuttle	Three-cone drill	Vertical jump	Broad jump	Bench press
5 ft 7 1/2 in (1.71 m)	197 lb (89 kg)	4.38 s	1.44 s	2.50 s	4.20 s	7.03 s	38.0 in (0.97 m)	10 ft 1 in (3.07 m)	20 reps
All values from Pro Day

Woodhead did not receive an invite to the NFL Scouting Combine, so he had to use his pro day to show his abilities. According to a report on NFLDraftWatch.net, he ran the 40-yard dash in times of 4.33 to 4.38 seconds, which would have been the second-fastest among all running backs at the NFL Combine in March 2008. He posted the best pro-agility time of 4.03 seconds, the second-best vertical jump at 38 1/2 inches (980 mm), and the best 60-yard shuttle time (11.2 seconds).

=== New York Jets ===
Woodhead went undrafted in the 2008 NFL draft. However, he received a call from the New York Jets moments before the draft ended, about the two parties coming to an agreement on an undrafted rookie free agent contract. It was announced shortly after, that Woodhead had signed a deal with the organization.

On July 26, 2008, Woodhead was carted off the field due to an injury. He spent his entire rookie season on injured reserve.

On September 3, 2009, the Jets faced the Philadelphia Eagles in a preseason matchup. During this game, Woodhead rushed for 158 yards, the NFL's second-highest preseason total since 1992, and two touchdowns. Woodhead initially survived final cuts in September 2009, only to be waived a day later on September 6. He was re-signed to the Jets' practice squad on September 8. In October, Woodhead was moved from running back to wide receiver and on October 17, he was signed to the active roster after Jerricho Cotchery and Brad Smith became injured.

Woodhead saw his first regular season action on October 25, 2009. In the 38–0 win over the Oakland Raiders, Woodhead rushed three times for 24 yards. Overall, he finished the 2009 season with 15 carries for 64 rushing yards and eight receptions for 87 receiving yards.

Woodhead was released by the Jets on September 14, 2010.

=== New England Patriots ===
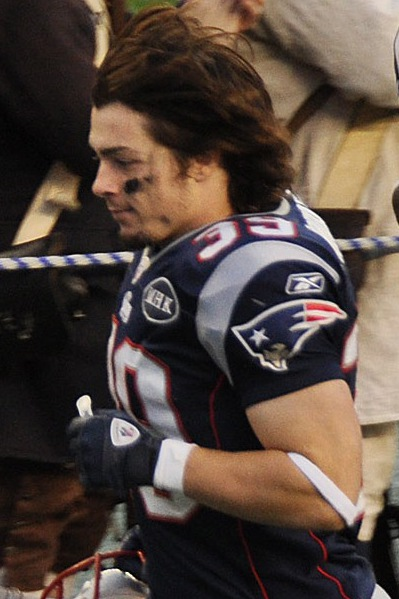
Woodhead with the Patriots in 2011.

Woodhead was signed by the New England Patriots on September 18, 2010, one day before the team's Week 2 matchup against the New York Jets. The team had an open roster spot for Woodhead after the trade of Laurence Maroney; Woodhead was inactive for the game, which saw longtime Patriots third-down running back Kevin Faulk go down for the season with a knee injury. On September 26, making his Patriots debut as well as his first career start, Woodhead had a 22-yard touchdown run against the Buffalo Bills, his first NFL touchdown. In Week 4, Woodhead added an 11-yard touchdown reception in a win over the Miami Dolphins. Against the Indianapolis Colts in Week 11, Woodhead had a 36-yard touchdown run in a Patriots win.

On November 19, 2010, Woodhead signed a two-year contract extension with the Patriots, through the 2012 season.

Woodhead finished the 2010 season with three starts in 14 games played. He had 97 carries for 547 yards (5.6 yard average), and 5 rushing touchdowns. He also caught 34 passes for 379 yards and one receiving touchdown. Woodhead was part of the Patriots postseason roster until the team lost 28–21 to his former team, the New York Jets, in the Divisional Round.

In the 2011 season, Woodhead had 77 carries for 351 rushing yards and a touchdown to go along with 18 receptions for 157 yards. The Patriots finished with a 13–3 record and won the AFC East. In the Divisional Round against the Denver Broncos, he had four carries for 25 yards in the 45–10 victory. In the AFC Championship, he had six carries for 18 yards and a seven-yard reception in the 23–20 victory over the Baltimore Ravens. On February 5, 2012, he made a catch in the second quarter of Super Bowl XLVI to score the first touchdown in the game for the Patriots. New England would eventually lose the game to the New York Giants 21–17. Woodhead finished with four catches for 42 yards and a touchdown while rushing seven times for 18 yards.

In the 2012 season, Woodhead had 76 carries for 301 yards and four touchdowns to go along with 40 receptions for 446 yards and three touchdowns.

=== San Diego Chargers ===
Woodhead agreed to terms with the San Diego Chargers on March 15, 2013. He signed a two-year, $3.5 million contract. The deal included a $1 million signing bonus. He scored his first touchdown as a Charger in a Week 4 matchup against the Dallas Cowboys. The Chargers won the game and Woodhead ended up with two touchdown catches. Sharing time with Ronnie Brown as the team's backup to Ryan Mathews, Woodhead enjoyed a career year. He led all NFL running backs with six touchdown receptions and was second with 76 catches for 605 yards in the regular season. He also had 106 carries for 429 yards, averaging 4.0 yards per attempt, for an overall 1,034 yards and eight touchdowns; he added a dimension missing in San Diego's offense since Darren Sproles departed after 2010. Of all the Chargers free agent acquisitions in 2013, quarterback Philip Rivers said he "was most excited about" Woodhead.

Against the Buffalo Bills in Week 3 of 2014, Woodhead suffered a leg and ankle injury and was carted off the field. His season ended after he was diagnosed with a broken fibula. In limited time in the 2014 season, he had 38 rushing yards and five receptions for 34 yards.

After recovering from a broken fibula, Woodhead had a strong showing against the Detroit Lions, rushing for 43 yards and scoring two touchdowns. Against the Cleveland Browns, Woodhead had 54 rushing yards that included a 19-yard rush that set up a game-winning field goal by Josh Lambo and also had 84 receiving yards, one of those catches being for 61 yards, the longest of his career. Against the Miami Dolphins, Woodhead scored three touchdowns on six receptions, and another touchdown running the ball for a single-game career-high for touchdowns in a game. He scored 24 total points in the game, which was the most by any player in a single game in the 2015 season. Overall, he finished the 2015 season with 98 carries for 336 rushing yards and three touchdowns to go along with 80 receptions for 755 receiving yards and six touchdowns.

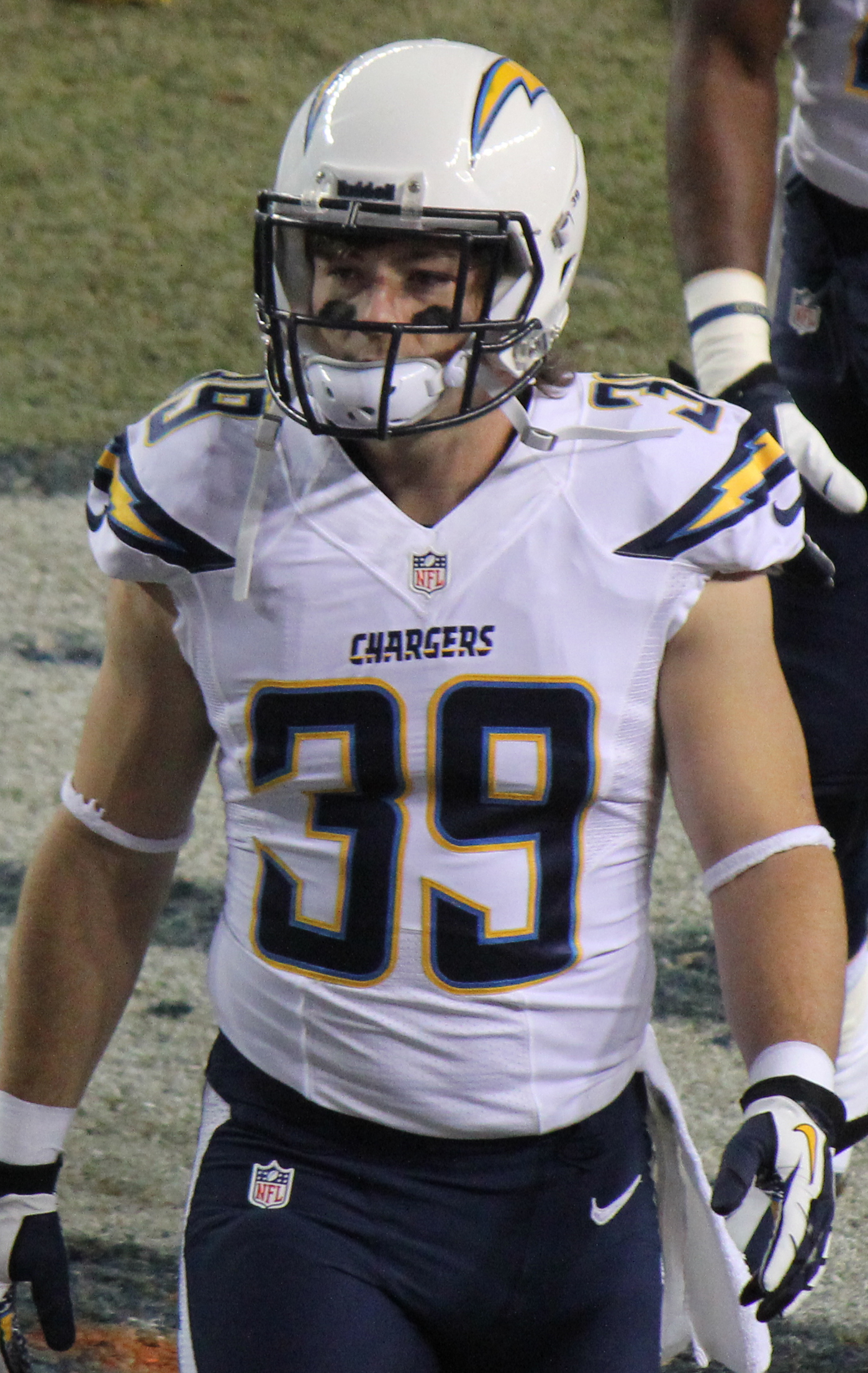
Woodhead with the San Diego Chargers in 2013

In the 2016 Week 2 matchup against the Jacksonville Jaguars, Woodhead suffered a torn ACL and was placed on injured reserve, ending his season.

=== Baltimore Ravens ===
On March 9, 2017, Woodhead signed a three-year contract with the Baltimore Ravens. In Week 1, Woodhead suffered a hamstring injury on the Ravens' opening drive and was initially ruled out for 4–6 weeks. On September 14, 2017, Woodhead was placed on injured reserve, causing him to miss at least eight weeks. He was activated off injured reserve to the active roster on November 18, 2017.

On March 13, 2018, Woodhead was released by the Ravens. Later that week, on March 17, Woodhead announced his retirement after 10 seasons in the league.

=== NFL career statistics ===
Season	Team	Games		Rushing					Receiving					Fumbles	
Season	Team	GP	GS	Att	Yds	Avg	Lng	TD	Rec	Yds	Avg	Lng	TD	Fum	Lost
2009	NYJ	10	0	15	64	4.3	16	0	8	87	10.9	24	0	0	0
2010	NYJ	1	0	0	0	0.0	0	0	0	0	0.0	0	0	0	0
2010	NE	14	3	97	547	5.6	36	5	34	379	11.1	50	1	1	1
2011	NE	15	4	77	351	4.6	12	1	18	157	8.7	16	0	0	0
2012	NE	16	2	76	301	4.0	19	4	40	446	11.2	25	3	1	0
2013	SD	16	2	106	429	4.0	14	2	76	605	8.0	39	6	2	2
2014	SD	3	0	15	38	2.5	13	0	5	34	6.8	14	0	0	0
2015	SD	16	2	98	336	3.4	27	3	80	755	9.4	61	6	0	0
2016	SD	2	1	19	116	6.1	23	0	6	35	5.8	12	1	0	0
2017	BAL	8	0	14	56	4.0	10	0	33	200	6.1	22	0	0	0
Career		101	14	517	2,238	4.3	36	15	300	2,698	9.0	61	17	4	3

== Golf career ==
At the end of his NFL career, Woodhead, a scratch golfer in high school who picked it up again in college, and especially while in San Diego, was able to qualify for the 2021 U.S. Amateur Four-Ball tournament at Chambers Bay, a major championship venue.

In 2022, Woodhead reached the Final Qualifying Round of the U.S. Open. Woodhead missed in the round by being +10.

Later, he qualified for the Nebraska Amateur Championship as medalist (low score in stroke play), and his swing coach noted the goal is a Masters Tournament qualification through winning the U.S. Mid-Amateur Golf Championship.

== Personal life ==
Woodhead was homeschooled until the ninth grade. Like him, both of his parents attended Chadron State and his father, Mark, played wide receiver for the Chadron State Eagles in the late 1970s.

Woodhead and his wife, Stacia, began dating when they were freshmen in high school. Together they have four children: Sis, William, Mae Mae and Hopie.

Woodhead hosts a weekly podcast with fellow NFL Veteran Matt Slauson. Woodhead and Slauson talk about their NFL careers, life in retirement, tell stories, and give advice.
