= Robert Turner (defensive back) =

American football player (1971–1991)

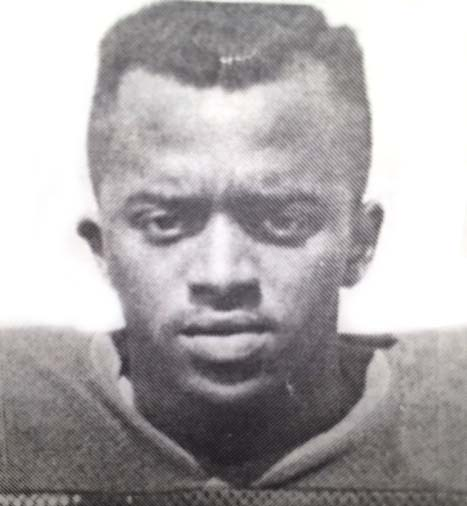
Robert "Showtime" Turner

Robert "Showtime" Turner Jr. (March 22, 1971 – May 19, 1991) was an American college football player.

Turner was born on March 22, 1971, in Vicksburg, Mississippi to Robert and Ruby Turner. He played quarterback for the Port Gibson High School Blue Waves; later he gained acclaim as a defensive back for Jackson State University. He earned Division I-AA All America and All-Southwestern Athletic Conference Honors in 1990.

After a breakout season, Turner was shot and killed on Sunday, May 19, 1991, outside a nightclub in Port Gibson.
