= Blaine Hawkins =

American football player

No. 3
- Position: Quarterback
- Class: Graduate student

Personal information
- Born: Ankeny, Iowa, U.S.
- Listed height: 5 ft 11 in (1.80 m)
- Listed weight: 210 lb (95 kg)

Career information
- High school: Ankeny
- College: Central (IA) (2017–2021)

Awards and highlights
- Gagliardi Trophy (2021); D3Football.com Offensive Player of the Year (2021); DIII First-team All-American (2021); Region 5 Offensive Player of the Year (2021); First-team All-Region 5 (2021); 2× A-R-C MVP (2019, 2021); 3× First-team All-A-R-C (2018, 2019, 2021); NCAA records: Most passing touchdowns in a season: 63 (2021); Most passing touchdowns in a half: 7 (Note: Record for the NCAA Division III only.)

Blaine Hawkins is an American former college football player who was a quarterback for the Central Dutch.

== College career ==
Hawkins started his career behind junior quarterback Nate Boland but made his college football debut on September 23, 2017, in the fourth game against Nebraska Wesleyan. In the 52–27 win over the Prairie Wolves he completed fourteen of 22 pass attempts for 253 yards and two touchdowns. After trailing 0–17 early, Hawkins ran in his first-career touchdown on a one-yard touchdown run in the second quarter. He threw his first-career touchdown pass later that same quarter with a 74-yard pass to Sam Markham. The following week, Hawkins amassed five-total touchdowns; three on the ground and one in the air. The team beat Simpson 35–17. Against Loras, he threw for a season-high, and school-record, 367 passing yards; a season-high, and school-record-tying, five touchdown passes; and ran for a season-high 131 rushing yards. Following the 65–24 win, he was named the American Rivers Conference (A-R-C) offensive player of the week and the D3football.com quarterback of the week. Following the season he earned the team's Lankelma-Menning Award for most outstanding underclass player, Brian O'Donnell Award for most outstanding freshman, and was an All-Conference honorable mention.

In 2018, Hawkins started nine of the team's ten games; only missing time against Coe. He threw for a season-high five touchdowns on thirteen completions in fifteen attempts against Luther. Against Buena Vista, Hawkins set Central's record for a single-game completion percentage with 94.1% as he completed sixteen of his seventeen pass attempts—while also throwing for four touchdown passes. Against Wartburg in the third-to-last game of the season he sustained an injury which caused him to miss the remainder of that game and the following week against Coe. He returned from injury against Loras. Following the season he earned All-A-R-C First Team honors and the team's Heerema-Schilder Award.

In 2019, Hawkins started all twelve of the team's games including postseason matchups against No. 21/18 Wisconsin–Oshkosh and No.3 Wheaton. He was voted as team captain prior to the season. During the season he broke multiple Central records: most passing completions in a season (252), most passing yards in a season (3,302), most passing touchdowns in a season (44), and highest total offense in a season (3,824). Hawkins began the season with a six touchdown performance against Northwestern (MN). He would tie that mark two other times against Loras and Wartburg later in the season. He had his worst-career game against Dubuque as he threw for 109 yards and five interceptions. Following the season he earned his second-straight Hereema-Schilder Award, he also earned First Team All-ARC honors and was the American Rivers Conference offensive MVP.

In 2020, due to COVID-19 the season was shortened and moved to the spring of 2021. Hawkins and Central only played two games against Simpson and Nebraska Wesleyan. In two games he threw for six touchdowns to only two interceptions as they won both games. Due to the pandemic he was awarded a fifth year of eligibility.

In 2021, Hawkins played and started all thirteen games and was voted as team captain for the second time. He helped lead the team to score at least fifty points in all but five games while exceeding sixty points five times—including a 84 to sixteen win over Simpson. To begin his historic campaign, he opened the season with seven-straight wins while also not throwing a single interception. Against Simpson he threw for a record-seven touchdown passes in the first half. He threw at least six touchdown passes in six-straight games. In the first round of the playoffs he again threw for seven touchdown passes. The team would make it to the third round of the playoffs before losing to Wisconsin–Whitewater. During the season he set the NCAA's single-season passing touchdown record with 63—the only player to surpass Bailey Zappe's 62 in the same season. At the end of the season he earned the Gagliardi Trophy while also earned Associated Press Division III All-America First Team honors.

=== Statistics ===
Year	Team	Games		Passing								Rushing			
Year	Team	GP	Record	Comp	Att	Pct	Yards	Avg	TD	Int	Rate	Att	Yards	Avg	TD
2017	Central (IA)	7	6–1	116	186	62.4	1,691	9.1	18	3	167.4	86	593	6.9	9
2018	Central (IA)	9	8–1	147	219	67.1	1,896	8.7	17	5	160.9	105	318	3.0	6
2019	Central (IA)	12	10–2	252	382	66.0	3,302	8.6	44	14	169.3	133	522	3.9	9
2020–21	Central (IA)	2	2–0	43	60	71.7	445	7.4	6	2	160.3	10	51	5.1	1
2021	Central (IA)	13	12–1	331	468	70.7	4,475	9.6	63	8	192.1	83	230	2.8	5
Career		43	38−5	889	1,315	67.6	11,809	9.0	148	32	175.3	417	1,714	4.1	30

=== Records ===
NCAA records

- Most touchdown passes in a season – 63 (2021)

NCAA Division III records

- Most touchdown passes in a half – 7 (at Simpson, 2021)
- Most touchdowns responsible for in a career – 172 (2017–2021)
- Most touchdown passes in a season – 63 (2021)

American Rivers Conference records (Note: League games only)

- Most touchdown passes in a season – 44 (2021)
- Most passing yards in a season – 2,827 (2021)
- Highest total offense in a season – 3,033 (2021)

School records

- Passing yards in a half – 428 (at Coe, 2021)
- Passing yards in a game – 503 (at Coe, 2021)
- Passing yards in a season – 4,475 (2021)
- Passing yards in a career – 11,809 (2017–2021)
- Most completions in a game – 41 (vs. Wheaton (IL), 2021)
- Most completions in a season – 331 (2021)
- Most completions in a career – 889 (2017–2021)
- Most pass attempts in a game – 65 (vs. Wheaton (IL), 2021)
- Most pass attempts in a season – 468 (2021)
- Most pass attempts in a career – 1,315 (2017–2021)
- Highest completion percentage in a game – 94.1% (vs. Buena Vista, 2018) (Note: sixteen of seventeen)
- Highest completion percentage in a season – 70.7% (2021) (Note: 331 of 468)
- Highest completion percentage in a career – 67.6% (2017–2021) (Note: 889 of 1,315)
- Most touchdown passes in a half – 7 (at Simpson, 2021)
- Most passing touchdowns in a game – 7 (at Simpson, 2021 / vs. Bethel (MN), 2021)
- Most passing touchdowns in a season – 63 (2021)
- Most passing touchdowns in a career – 148 (2017–2021)
- Highest pass efficiency rating in a season – 192.1 (2021) (Note: 331 of 468, eight interceptions, 4,475 yards, 63 touchdowns)
- Highest pass efficiency rating in a career – 175.3 (2017–2021) (Note: 889 of 1,315, 32 interceptions, 11,809 yards, and 148 touchdowns)
- Highest total offensive yards in a game – 514 (at Coe, 2021) (Note: 503 passing, eleven rushing)
- Highest total offensive yards in a season – 4,705 (2021) (Note: 4,475 passing, 230 rushing)
- Highest total offensive yards in a career – 13,524 (2017–2021) (Note: 11,809 passing, 1,715 rushing)
- Most consecutive passes without an interception – 251 (nine games)
