= LeRoy Vann =

American gridiron football player (born 1986)

No. 6
- Position: Cornerback / Return specialist

Personal information
- Born: November 18, 1986 (age 39); Tampa, Florida
- Listed height: 5 ft 9 in (1.75 m)
- Listed weight: 185 lb (84 kg)

Career information
- High school: Tampa (FL) Blake
- College: Florida A&M
- NFL draft: 2010: undrafted

Career history
- San Francisco 49ers (2010)*; Montreal Alouettes (2010); Cincinnati Bengals (2011)*; Georgia Force (2012); Columbus Lions (2013); San Antonio Talons (2014)
- * Offseason or practice squad member only

Awards and highlights
- 2× All-American (2008, 2009); Second-team All-PIFL (2014)

Career CFL statistics as of 2010
- Tackles: 6
- Kickoff returns: 15
- Kickoff return yards: 297
- Punt returns: 8
- Punt return yards: 52
- Stats at CFL.ca (archived)

Career AFL statistics as of 2014
- Tackles: 19
- Return yards: 293
- Return TDs: 1
- Stats at ArenaFan.com
- Stats at Pro Football Reference

Leroy Vann (born November 18, 1986) is an American former football cornerback and return specialist. He was signed by the San Francisco 49ers as an undrafted free agent in 2010. He played college football at Florida A&M.

== Early life ==
Vann attended Howard W. Blake High School in Tampa, Florida.

== College career ==
Vann attended Florida A&M University and played college football for the Florida A&M Rattlers where he was an excellent punt returner and kick returner, returning seven punts for touchdowns.

== Professional career ==
Vann was signed by the San Francisco 49ers as an undrafted free agent following the 2010 NFL draft. He was waived on August 9, 2010.

Vann signed with the Montreal Alouettes of the Canadian Football League (CFL) in 2010. He spent his time on special teams, returning kicks and punts.

He was signed as a free agent by the Cincinnati Bengals on August 17, 2011, but was waived on August 27.
