= St. Vincent High School (Perryville, Missouri) =

Location
- 210 South Waters Street; Perryville, (Perry County), Missouri 63775; United States; 37°43′23″N 89°52′30″W

Information
- Type: Parochial, Coeducational
- Motto: Religio ∙ Scientia ∙ Cultura (Religion ∙ Knowledge ∙ Culture)
- Religious affiliation: Roman Catholic
- Patron saint: St. Vincent DePaul
- Established: 1896
- President: Zachary Stobart
- Principal: Ranjan Lima
- Grades: 7–12
- Colors: Royal Blue and Gold
- Athletics conference: I-55 Conference (Football) MAFC - Blue (Others)
- Sports: Baseball, basketball, cheerleading, chess, cross country, football, golf, soccer, softball, swimming, track and field, and volleyball.
- Mascot: Indian
- Team name: Indians or Lady Indians
- Accreditation: North Central Association of Colleges and Schools
- Athletic Directors: Mel Kirn and Bruce Valleroy
- Acknowledgments: Top 50 Parochial High Schools Nationally (2018-Present)
- Website: svschools.org/schools/junior-senior-high-school/

St. Vincent High School is a private, Roman Catholic high school in Perryville, Missouri. It is located in the Roman Catholic Archdiocese of Saint Louis.

== Background ==
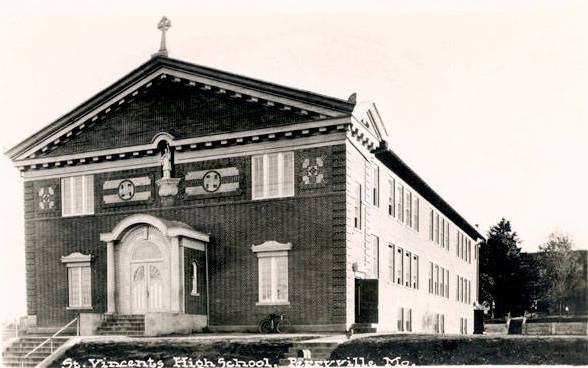
Old St. Vincent's High School

St. Vincent was established in 1896 as St. Vincent Parish School. The Daughters of Charity took over teaching responsibility in 1907.
