= Arnold Mickens =

American football player (1972–2022)

No. 27
- Position: Running back

Personal information
- Born: October 12, 1972; Indianapolis, Indiana, U.S.
- Died: January 18, 2022 (aged 49); Indianapolis, Indiana, U.S.
- Listed height: 5 ft 11 in (1.80 m)
- Listed weight: 217 lb (98 kg)

Career information
- High school: Broad Ripple (Indianapolis)
- College: Indiana (1991–1993); Butler (1994–1995)
- NFL draft: 1996: undrafted

Career history
- Indianapolis Colts (1996–1997)
- Stats at Pro Football Reference

Arnold Lee Mickens Jr. (October 12, 1972 – January 18, 2022) was an American professional football running back who played one season with the Indianapolis Colts of the National Football League (NFL). He played college football at Indiana University Bloomington and Butler University.

== Early life ==
Arnold Lee Mickens Jr. was born on October 12, 1972, in Indianapolis, Indiana. He attended Broad Ripple High School in Indianapolis. He was a linebacker and running back on the football team at Broad Ripple High, earning all-state honors.

== College career ==
Mickens was a member of the Indiana Hoosiers of the Indiana University Bloomington from 1991 to 1993 and a two-year letterman from 1992 to 1993. He redshirted the 1991 season, and played several positions on the scout team. He was converted to linebacker full-time in 1992 and started one game that year, recording 34 tackles and one sack. He garnered Big Ten all-academic team recognition in 1992. He played in seven games in 1993, posting four tackles.

Mickens then transferred to play for the Butler Bulldogs of Butler University, where he was a two-year letterman at running back from 1994 to 1995. He rushed for an NCAA Division I-AA record 2,255 yards in 1994. He rushed for over 200 yards in an NCAA Division I-AA record eight straight games in 1994 as well. Mickens also set NCA Division I-AA records in single-game rushing attempts with 56, most consecutive rushing attempts by the same player with 26, and career rushing yards per game with 190.7. He majored in public and corporate communications at Butler. He was inducted into Butler's athletics hall of fame in 2009.

He was a member of Phi Beta Sigma fraternity.

== Professional career ==
After going undrafted in the 1996 NFL draft, Mickens signed with the Indianapolis Colts on April 26. He was released on August 28, signed to the team's practice squad on September 10, released again on September 23, and signed to the practice squad again on October 15. He was promoted to the active roster on October 18 and played in three games (primarily on special teams) for the Colts before being released on November 12. Mickens was signed to the practice squad the next day. He signed a futures contract with the Colts on January 6, 1997. He was released on July 18, 1997, after failing a physical. He was later waived on March 11, 1998.

== Personal life ==
Mickens later worked as a counselor in the Indianapolis Public Schools system. He died on January 18, 2022, in Indianapolis at the age of 49.
