= Nate Kmic =

American football player (born 1987)

No. 36, 1
- Position: Running back

Personal information
- Born: June 22, 1987 (age 39); Delta, Ohio, U.S.
- Listed height: 5 ft 9 in (1.75 m)
- Listed weight: 195 lb (88 kg)

Career information
- High school: Delta
- College: Mount Union (2005–2008)
- NFL draft: 2011: undrafted

Career history
- Lappeenranta Rajaritarit (2011)

Awards and highlights
- IFAF World champion (2011); IFAF World Championship MVP (2011); NCAA second in all-divisions career rushing yards (8,074); NCAA all-divisions career all-purpose yards leader (9,651); NCAA all-divisions career total touchdowns leader (130); Melberger Award (2008); Stagg Bowl MVP (2005); 3× NCAA Division III national champion (2005, 2006, 2008); 2× D3Football.com Offensive Player of the Year (2006, 2008); 3× First-team All-American (2006, 2007, 2008); 3× First-team All-Ohio Athletic Conference (2006, 2007, 2008)

Nate Kmic
Medal record

Men's American football

Representing United States

World Championship
Gold medal – first place	2011 Austria	Team competition

Nate Kmic (born June 22, 1987) is an American former professional football running back. He played college football at Mount Union College after graduating from Delta High School in rural Delta, Ohio.

In his college career, he set rushing records for both NCAA Division III as well as the NCAA all-division record. At Mount Union, Kmic won three NCAA Division III football championships and was a three-time All-American and three-time All-Ohio Athletic Conference running back.

After playing in the 2011 IFAF World Championship, representing Team USA, he signed a professional contract with the Lappeenranta Rajaritarit (Lapeenranta Border Knights) of the Finnish Maple League (Vaahteraliiga).

He later served as an assistant coach and running backs coach for the Mount Union Purple Raiders football team from 2009 to 2012. Since September 2012, Kmic has worked at Alro Steel Corporation, a distributor of metals, plastic, and industrial supplies.

== Early life ==
As a senior at Delta High School in Ohio, Kmic rushed for 1,681 yards and recorded 65 tackles and five interceptions on defense.

== College career ==
During the 2008 season, Kmic broke the Division III career record for rushing yards set in 2000 by R. J. Bowers of Grove City College. That year, he rushed for 2,790 yards and 43 touchdowns while also recording 262 receiving yards and 1 touchdown, setting the NCAA all-division single-season record for touchdowns with 44 and points with 264.

On December 13, 2008, he rushed for 310 yards against Wheaton College, helping lead the Purple Raiders to a 45–24 victory, earning them a trip to Salem, Virginia for the 2008 Stagg Bowl where they defeated the UW-Whitewater Warhawks 31–26 in the fourth consecutive meeting of the two programs for the Division III Championship.

In the semifinal game, Kmic brought his career rushing total to 7,986, surpassing the previous record of 7,962 held by Danny Woodhead of NCAA Division II Chadron State. Kmic rushed for 88 yards in the Stagg Bowl, bringing his total to 8,074, the most of any player in NCAA history, and the first and only player to rush for over 8,000 yards.

In April 2009, Kmic received the 2008 Melberger Award, granted annually to the outstanding Division III football player.

=== College statistics ===
			Rushing				Receiving				Kick Ret			
Year	Team	GP	Att	Yards	Avg	TDs	Rec	Yards	Avg	TDs	Ret	Yds	Avg	TDs
2005	Mount Union	11	202	1,219	6.0	18	16	197	12.3	1	12	283	23.6	0
2006	Mount Union	15	336	2,365	7.0	26	20	173	8.6	2	14	333	23.8	0
2007	Mount Union	15	274	1,700	6.2	38	14	117	8.4	1	6	146	24.3	0
2008	Mount Union	15	377	2,790	7.4	43	25	262	10.5	1	5	66	13.2	0
College totals		56	1,189	8,074	6.8	125	75	749	10.0	5	37	828	22.4	0

== Professional career ==
After the World Championship, and after an injury to former USC Trojans running back Mike Bolio, Kmic signed a professional contract with Finnish top league Vaahteraliiga team Lappeenranta Rajaritarit, with whom he played the rest of the 2011 season replacing Bolio. In the final two regular season games, Kmic rushed for 265 yards on 33 attempts and two touchdowns and also scored on a reception and kick return. In his first professional game, he rushed for 135 yards and two touchdowns in addition to an 86-yard kickoff return touchdown. Lappeenranta finished the regular season with a 7–3 record.

The team lost in the Vaahteraliiga league playoff semi final game 38–28 to the Seinäjoki Crocodiles. Kmic did not find the endzone in the game, but rushed for 98 yards on 16 carries and had five receptions for 48 yards.

== National team career ==
Kmic was selected to play for Team USA at the 2011 IFAF World Championship held in Austria, winning tournament MVP honors. The USA defeated Canada in the gold medal game, which saw Kmic rushing for two touchdowns. Kmic was then signed to play in Finland.
