= NCAA Division I FCS passing leaders =

College football statistics

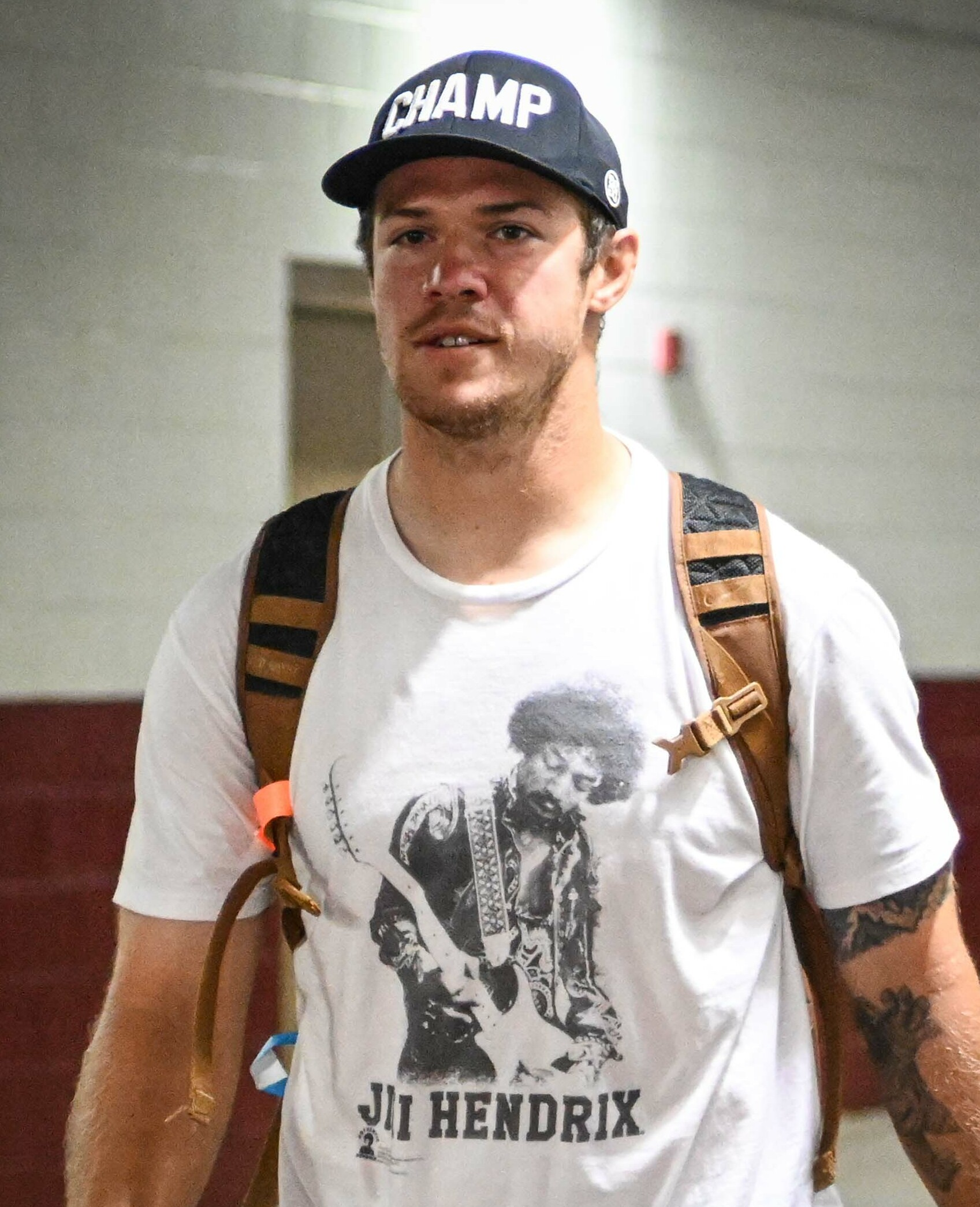
Taylor Heinicke – FCS single-game passing record holder (730 yards vs. New Hampshire, Sept. 22, 2012). Ranked among the top 3 in FCS single-season passing yards.

This page lists the top individual passing performances in the NCAA Division I Football Championship Subdivision (FCS), including career passing yards and touchdowns, single-season passing yards and touchdowns, and single-game passing yards and touchdowns.

FCS quarterbacks such as Devlin Hodges, Taylor Heinicke, Bruce Eugene, and Willie Totten have set notable records at multiple levels. Eugene holds the career passing touchdowns record, surpassing Totten, who played alongside NFL legend Jerry Rice in the 1980s. Lindsey Scott holds the single-season passing touchdowns record, while Ren Hefley set the single-game passing touchdowns mark. Taylor Heinicke holds the single-game passing yards record. The lists below include both career and single-season leaders, as well as single-game performances, reflecting the most prolific passing achievements in FCS history. Statistics reflect official FCS games and are current through the end of the 2025 season.

== Passing yards ==
Samford's Devlin Hodges is the NCAA FCS career passing yards leader with 14,584 yards, surpassing Steve McNair of Alcorn State and Bruce Eugene of Grambling State. Hodges is one of only four FCS players to exceed 13,500 career passing yards, joining McNair, Eric Barriere of Eastern Washington, and Eugene. Many of the top FCS passers maximized their eligibility, with several playing five seasons, allowing them to challenge long-standing records. While slightly below the all-time FBS leader Case Keenum of Houston (19,217 yards), multiple FCS quarterbacks have surpassed 12,000 career yards, ranking among the most prolific passers in NCAA history.

=== Career ===
#	Player	Yards	Seasons
1	Devlin Hodges	14,584	2015 2016 2017 2018 Samford
2	Steve McNair	14,496	1991 1992 1993 1994 Alcorn State
3	Eric Barriere	13,803	2017 2018 2019 2021 Eastern Washington
4	Bruce Eugene	13,513	2001 2002 2003 2004 2005 Grambling State
5	Tim DeMorat	13,461	2018 2019 2021 2022 Fordham
6	Dominic Randolph	13,455	2006 2007 2008 2009 Holy Cross
7	Jeremy Moses	13,401	2007 2008 2009 2010 Stephen F. Austin
8	Scott Riddle	13,264	2007 2008 2009 2010 Elon
9	Ricky Santos	13,212	2004 2005 2006 2007 New Hampshire
10	Jimmy Garoppolo	13,156	2010 2011 2012 2013 Eastern Illinois
11	Parker McKinney	12,760	2018 2019 2020 2021 2022 2023 Eastern Kentucky
12	Willie Totten	12,711	1982 1983 1984 1985 Mississippi Valley State
13	Anthony Lawrence	12,638	2015 2016 2017 2018 San Diego
14	Matt Nichols	12,616	2006 2007 2008 2009 Eastern Washington
15	Marcus Brady	12,479	1998 1999 2000 2001 Cal State Northridge
16	Cameron Higgins	12,252	2007 2008 2009 2010 Weber State
17	Jamie Martin	12,207	1989 1990 1991 1992 Weber State
18	Aqeel Glass	12,136	2017 2018 2019 2021 Alabama A&M
19	Case Cookus	12,092	2015 2016 2017 2018 2019 Northern Arizona
20	Austin Gahafer	11,918	2013 2014 2015 2016 Morehead State
21	Robert Kent	11,784	2000 2001 2002 2003 Jackson State
22	Peter Pujals	11,695	2013 2014 2015 2017 Holy Cross
23	Sean Schaefer	11,644	2005 2006 2007 2008 Towson
24	Neil Lomax	11,550	1978 1979 1980 Portland State
25	Taryn Christion	11,535	2015 2016 2017 2018 South Dakota State

=== Single season ===
Eastern Washington's Gage Gubrud holds the FCS single-season passing yards record with 5,160 yards in 2016. He is one of only six FCS players to throw for over 5,000 yards in a season, joining Cole Kelley (Southeastern Louisiana, 2021), Taylor Heinicke (Old Dominion, 2012), Eric Barriere (Eastern Washington, 2021), Jimmy Garoppolo (Eastern Illinois, 2013), and Jeremiah Briscoe (Sam Houston, 2017).

#	Player	Yards	Season
1	Gage Gubrud	5,160	2016 Eastern Washington
2	Cole Kelley	5,124	2021 Southeastern Louisiana
3	Taylor Heinicke	5,076	2012 Old Dominion
4	Eric Barriere	5,055	2021 Eastern Washington
5	Jimmy Garoppolo	5,050	2013 Eastern Illinois
6	Jeremiah Briscoe	5,003	2017 Sam Houston
7	Vernon Adams	4,994	2013 Eastern Washington
8	Tim DeMorat	4,891	2022 Fordham
9	Steve McNair	4,863	1994 Alcorn State
10	Lindsey Scott Jr.	4,686	2022 UIW
11	Cam Ward	4,648	2021 UIW
12	Jeremiah Briscoe	4,602	2016 Sam Houston
13	Dustin Long	4,588	2004 Sam Houston
14	Willie Totten	4,557	1984 Mississippi Valley State
15	Miles Hastings	4,493	2024 UC Davis
16	Bruce Eugene	4,483	2002 Grambling State
17	Cameron Higgins	4,460	2008 Weber State
18	Michael Nebrich	4,380	2013 Fordham
19	Chris Lum	4,378	2011 Lehigh
20	Bruce Eugene	4,360	2005 Grambling State
21	Brett Gordon	4,305	2002 Villanova
22	Devlin Hodges	4,283	2018 Samford
23	Brady Attaway	4,268	2013 Stephen F. Austin
24	Joe Flacco	4,263	2007 Delaware
25	Martin Hankins	4,240	2004 Southeastern Louisiana

=== Single game ===
The FCS single-game passing yards record is held by Taylor Heinicke of Old Dominion, who threw for 730 yards against New Hampshire on September 22, 2012. Many other FCS quarterbacks have surpassed 500 yards in a game, highlighting the prolific passing offenses in the subdivision.

#	Yards	Player	Team / Opponent	Date
1	730	Taylor Heinicke	Old Dominion vs. New Hampshire	Sept. 22, 2012
2	662	Brady Attaway	SFA vs. Prairie View	Sept. 28, 2013
3	660	Braden Hanson	North Dakota vs. Montana	Oct. 20, 2012
4	647	Cole Kelley	Southeastern Louisiana vs. UIW	Nov. 6, 2021
5	624	Jamie Martin	Weber State vs. Idaho State	Nov. 23, 1991
6	623	Drew Hubel	Portland State vs. Eastern Washington	Oct. 4, 2008
7	620	Cole Gonzales	Western Carolina vs. Furman	Oct. 19, 2024
8	619	Doug Pederson	Northeast Louisiana vs. SFA	Nov. 11, 1989
9	618	Bruce Eugene	Grambling vs. Prairie View	Oct. 1, 2005
10	610	Cameron Ward	UIW vs. Southeastern Louisiana	Nov. 6, 2021
11	600	Casey Brockman	Murray State vs. Tennessee State	Sept. 17, 2011
11	600	Eric Barriere	Eastern Washington vs. Idaho	Oct. 16, 2021
13	599	Willie Totten	Mississippi Valley State vs. Prairie View	Oct. 27, 1984
14	595	Robert Kent	Jackson State vs. Alabama State	Oct. 6, 2001
15	589	Vern Harris	Idaho State vs. Montana	Oct. 12, 1985
16	588	Martin Hankins	Southeastern Louisiana vs. Ark.-Monticello	Sept. 2, 2004
17	587	Steve McNair	Alcorn vs. Southern U.	Oct. 22, 1994
18	582	Liam Welch	Samford vs. ETSU	Sept. 25, 2021
19	577	Dustin Long	Sam Houston vs. McNeese	Nov. 6, 2004
20	576	Ren Hefley	Presbyterian vs. St. Andrews	Sept. 4, 2021
21	574	Michael Herrick	Northern Arizona vs. Eastern Washington	Nov. 21, 2009
22	571	Todd Hammel	SFA vs. Northeast Louisiana	Nov. 11, 1989
23	570	Casey Brockman	Murray State vs. Missouri State	Oct. 9, 2010
23	570	Liam Welch	Samford vs. VMI	March 20, 2021
25	567	Joe Lee	Towson vs. Lehigh	Oct. 30, 1999
25	567	Bailey Zappe	Houston Baptist vs. Texas Tech	Sept. 12, 2020
25	567	Paxton DeLaurent	Southeast Missouri State vs. Illinois State	Nov. 30, 2024

== Passing touchdowns ==
=== Career ===
The FCS career passing touchdowns record is held by Bruce Eugene of Grambling State, who threw 140 touchdowns from 2001 to 2005, surpassing the previous mark set by Willie Totten of Mississippi Valley State. Totten had originally set the record while playing alongside future NFL Hall of Famer Jerry Rice in the 1980s.

#	Player	TDs	Seasons
1	Bruce Eugene	140	2001 2002 2003 2004 2005 Grambling State
2	Willie Totten	139	1982 1983 1984 1985 Mississippi Valley State
3	Ricky Santos	123	2004 2005 2006 2007 New Hampshire
3	Tim DeMorat	123	2018 2019 2021 2022 Fordham
5	Eric Barriere	121	2017 2018 2019 2021 Eastern Washington
5	Jeremy Moses	121	2007 2008 2009 2010 Stephen F. Austin
7	Anthony Lawrence	120	2015 2016 2017 2018 San Diego
8	Steve McNair	119	1991 1992 1993 1994 Alcorn State
9	Jimmy Garoppolo	118	2010 2011 2012 2013 Eastern Illinois
10	Dominic Randolph	117	2006 2007 2008 2009 Holy Cross
11	Josh McGregor	116	2008 2009 2010 2011 Jacksonville
11	Jeremiah Briscoe	116	2014 2015 2016 2017 Sam Houston
13	Josh Johnson	113	2004 2005 2006 2007 San Diego
14	Devlin Hodges	111	2015 2016 2017 2018 Samford
15	Marcus Brady	109	1998 1999 2000 2001 Cal State Northridge
15	Aqeel Glass	109	2017 2018 2019 2021 Alabama A&M
17	Scott Riddle	106	2007 2008 2009 2010 Elon
18	Case Cookus	105	2015 2016 2017 2018 2019 Northern Arizona
19	Robert Kent	104	2000 2001 2002 2003 Jackson State
19	Taryn Christion	104	2015 2016 2017 2018 South Dakota State
21	Niel Loebig	103	2001 2002 2003 2004 Duquesne
22	Cameron Higgins	98	2007 2008 2009 2010 Weber State
23	Dave Dickenson	96	1992 1993 1994 1995 Montana
23	Matt Nichols	96	2006 2007 2008 2009 Eastern Washington
25	Mason Mills	95	2010 2011 2012 2013 San Diego

=== Single season ===
The FCS single-season passing touchdowns record is held by Lindsey Scott of UIW (University of the Incarnate Word), who threw 60 touchdowns in 2022. Other quarterbacks who have surpassed 50 in a season include Jeremiah Briscoe of Sam Houston and Bruce Eugene of Grambling State.

#	Player	TDs	Season
1	Lindsey Scott	60	2022 UIW
2	Jeremiah Briscoe	57	2016 Sam Houston
3	Willie Totten	56	1984 Mississippi Valley State
3	Bruce Eugene	56	2005 Grambling State
3	Tim DeMorat	56	2022 Fordham
6	Vernon Adams	55	2013 Eastern Washington
7	Jimmy Garoppolo	53	2013 Eastern Illinois
8	Gage Gubrud	48	2016 Eastern Washington
9	Cam Ward	47	2021 UIW
10	Eric Barriere	46	2021 Eastern Washington
11	Jeremiah Briscoe	45	2017 Sam Houston
12	Steve McNair	44	1994 Alcorn State
12	Taylor Heinicke	44	2012 Old Dominion
12	Cole Kelley	44	2021 Southeastern Louisiana
15	Bruce Eugene	43	2002 Grambling State
15	Josh Johnson	43	2007 San Diego
17	Brian Ah Yat	42	1996 Montana
18	Jeremy Moses	41	2008 Stephen F. Austin
18	Jeff Undercuffler	41	2019 UAlbany
18	Cole Johnson	41	2021 James Madison
21	Jeremy Moses	40	2009 Stephen F. Austin
21	Shedeur Sanders	40	2022 Jackson State
21	Tommy Rittenhouse	40	2025 Illinois State
24	Johnathan Williams	39	2015 Grambling State
24	Willie Totten	39	1985 Mississippi Valley State
24	Dustin Long	39	2004 Sam Houston
24	Ricky Santos	39	2005 New Hampshire
24	Anthony Lawrence	39	2018 San Diego
24	Ren Hefley	39	2021 Presbyterian

=== Single game ===
In the 84–43 season opener on September 4, 2021, Ren Hefley of Presbyterian set the FCS single‑game touchdown record with 10 touchdown passes against St. Andrews.

#	Player	TDs	Game	Date
1	Ren Hefley	10	Presbyterian vs. St. Andrews	Sept. 4, 2021
2	Willie Totten	9	Mississippi Valley State vs. Kentucky State	Sept 1, 1984
2	Drew Hubel	9	Portland State vs. Eastern Washington	Oct. 27, 2007

== Passing efficiency ==
Passing efficiency is a measure of quarterback performance based on the following formula:

$\text{Passing Efficiency} = {(100 \times \text{completions}) + (8.4 \times \text{yards}) + (330 \times \text{touchdowns}) - (200 \times \text{interceptions}) \over \text{attempts}}$

Only passing statistics are included in the formula. Any yards or touchdowns gained rushing or by any other method are not a factor in the formula, and neither are fumbles. Players tend to rank highly on the list when they have a high completion percentage, high yards per completion, and many touchdowns to few interceptions.

=== Career ===
The FCS career passing efficiency record (minimum 425 completions; player must have concluded his career) is held by Josh Johnson of the San Diego Toreros, who recorded a career passer efficiency rating of 176.7 from 2004 to 2007. He finished his career with 1,065 passing attempts, 724 completions, 15 interceptions, 9,699 passing yards, and 113 touchdown passes.

#	Player	Rating	Seasons
1	Josh Johnson	176.7	2004 2005 2006 2007 San Diego
2	Vernon Adams	173.8	2012 2013 2014 Eastern Washington
3	Cole Kelley	169.8	2019 2020 2021 Southeastern Louisiana
4	Lindsey Scott	168.6	2020 2021 2022 Nicholls / UIW
5	Erik Meyer	166.5	2002 2003 2004 2005 Eastern Washington
6	Dave Dickenson	166.3	1992 1993 1994 1995 Montana
7	Cam Miller	165.0	2020 2021 2022 2023 2024 North Dakota State
8	Cole Johnson	164.3	2016 2017 2018 2019 2020 2021 James Madison
9	Michael Nebrich	162.2	2012 2013 2014 Fordham
10	Tommy Mellott	162.1	2021 2022 2023 2024 Montana State
11	Anthony Lawrence	161.8	2015 2016 2017 2018 San Diego
12	Eric Sanders	161.4	2004 2005 2006 2007 UNI
13	Drew Miller	160.5	1999 2000 Montana
14	Eric Rasmussen	160.1	2001 2002 2003 San Diego
15	Easton Stick	159.5	2015 2016 2017 2018 North Dakota State
16	Bryan Schor	158.9	2014 2015 2016 2017 James Madison
16	Mark Gronowski	158.9	2020 2021 2022 2023 2024 South Dakota State
18	Ricky Santos	157.2	2004 2005 2006 2007 New Hampshire
19	Lang Campbell	156.6	2001 2002 2003 2004 William & Mary
19	Kevin Anderson	156.6	2014 2015 2016 2017 Fordham
21	Jeremiah Briscoe	155.9	2014 2015 2016 2017 Sam Houston
22	Gage Gubrud	155.8	2015 2016 2017 2018 Eastern Washington
23	Jack Cook	155.3	2017 2018 2019 2020 2021 Dayton
24	Kevin Hoyng	155.1	2004 2005 2006 2007 Dayton

=== Season ===
The FCS single-season passing efficiency record (minimum 15 passing attempts per game) is held by Shawn Knight of the William & Mary Tribe, who posted a passer efficiency rating of 204.6 in 1993. He completed 125 of 177 passing attempts, threw 4 interceptions, gained 2,055 passing yards, and recorded 22 touchdown passes over 10 games. Other notable single-season performances include Josh Johnson of San Diego in 2007 (198.3 rating), Lindsey Scott of UIW in 2022 (197.7 rating), and Jonathan Dally of Cal Poly in 2007 (196.7 rating).

#	Player	Rating	Season
1	Shawn Knight	204.6	1993 William & Mary
2	Josh Johnson	198.3	2007 San Diego
3	Lindsey Scott	197.7	2022 UIW
4	Jonathan Dally	196.7	2007 Cal Poly
5	Quentin Williams	187.2	2015 Bethune–Cookman
6	Bryan Schor	186.2	2016 James Madison
7	Case Cookus	184.8	2015 Northern Arizona
8	Vernon Adams	183.1	2013 Eastern Washington
9	Michael Payton	181.3	1991 Marshall
9	John Robertson	181.3	2014 Villanova
11	Tim DeMorat	180.7	2022 Fordham
12	Trey Lance	180.6	2019 North Dakota State
13	Cam Miller	180.1	2024 North Dakota State
14	Mark Gronowski	179.7	2023 South Dakota State
15	Alli Abrew	179.5	1997 Cal Poly
16	Tony Romo	178.3	2001 Eastern Illinois
17	Tommy Mellott	177.7	2024 Montana State
18	Sam Vidlak	177.3	2024 SFA
19	Hayden Hildebrand	177.2	2017 Central Arkansas
20	Doug Turner	177.5	1997 Morehead State
21	Ted White	176.2	1996 Howard
22	Doug Nussmeier	175.2	1993 Idaho
23	Brian Kadel	175.0	1995 Dayton
24	Eric Rasmussen	174.5	2003 San Diego
25	Cole Kelley	174.2	2021 Southeastern Louisiana

=== Single game ===
The NCAA does not recognize a comprehensive list of single-game passing efficiency records, but notable FCS performances include:

- Minimum 15 attempts – 389.9: (16 of 17, 363 yards, 6 TD, 0 INT) – Mark Washington of Jackson State vs. Alcorn State, November 20, 1999
- Minimum 25 attempts – 319.1: (22 of 25, 452 yards, 6 TD, 0 INT) – Matt Barr of Western Illinois vs. Illinois State, October 30, 2010
- Minimum 45 attempts – 243.8: (42 of 46, 560 yards, 7 TD, 0 INT) – Derek Carr of UT Martin vs. Murray State, October 13, 2012

== Completions ==
=== Career ===
The FCS career passing completions and attempts record is held by Devlin Hodges of Samford, who completed 1,310 of 1,896 pass attempts from 2015 to 2018. He also set the FCS single-season average completions per game record in 2018, completing 388 passes over 11 games for an average of 35.3 completions per game.

=== Season ===
The FCS single-season passing completions record is held by Cole Kelley of Southeastern Louisiana, who completed 406 passes out of 552 attempts in 2021.

=== Single game ===
The FCS single-game completions record is held by Jeremy Moses of Stephen F. Austin, who completed 57 passes against Sam Houston on November 1, 2008. Other notable performances include Taron Dickens of Western Carolina, who completed 53 passes against Wofford in 2025, setting the FCS record for consecutive completions in a single game with 46 straight completions.

#	Player	Comp	Date / Team
1	Jeremy Moses	57	Nov. 1, 2008 Stephen F. Austin
2	Liam Welch	56	Sept. 25, 2021 Samford
3	Taylor Heinicke	55	Sept. 22, 2012 Old Dominion
4	Taron Dickens	53	Oct. 4, 2025 Western Carolina
5	Martin Hankins	50	Nov. 6, 2004 Southeastern Louisiana
5	Ren Hefley	50	Oct. 9, 2021 Presbyterian
5	Cole Kelley	50	Nov. 6, 2021 Southeastern Louisiana
8	KD Humphries	49	Oct. 1, 2016 Murray State
8	Reece Udinski	49	Oct. 20, 2018 VMI
8	Bailey Zappe	49	Oct. 5, 2019 Houston Baptist
11	Clayton Millis	48	Nov. 11, 1995 CSUN
11	KD Humphries	48	Oct. 4, 2014 Murray State
11	Austin Simmons	48	Sept. 14, 2019 South Dakota
11	Paxton DeLaurent	48	Nov. 30, 2024 Southeast Missouri State
15	Jamie Martin	47	Nov. 23, 1991 Weber State
15	Joe Lee	47	Oct. 30, 1999 Towson
15	Michael Herrick	47	Nov. 21, 2009 Northern Arizona
15	Kevin Yost	47	Sept. 17, 2011 Idaho State
15	Brady Gustafson	47	Sept. 24, 2016 Montana
15	Gage Gubrud	47	Dec. 3, 2016 Eastern Washington
15	Eric Barriere	47	Dec. 3, 2021 Eastern Washington
15	Michael Hiers	47	Oct. 22, 2022 Samford
23	Willie Totten	46	Sept. 29, 1984 Mississippi Valley State
23	Doug Pederson	46	Nov. 11, 1989 Northeast Louisiana
23	Kyle Newhall-Caballe	46	Oct. 10, 2009 Brown
23	Troy Mitchell	46	Aug. 30, 2014 Western Carolina

== Completion percentage ==
=== Career ===
The FCS career completion percentage record (minimum 750 attempts) is held by Michael Hiers of Samford, who completed 669 of 901 passes (74.3%) from 2022 to 2023. Hiers previously spent two years at Murray State but saw limited action.

=== Single season ===
The FCS single-season completion percentage record (minimum 200 attempts) is held by Michael Hiers of Samford, who completed 353 of 461 passes (76.6%) in 2022.

=== Single game ===
The NCAA doesn't recognize a full list for FCS single-game completion percentage, but top performances include:

- Minimum 20 completions – 96.15% (25 of 26) – Ricky Santos of New Hampshire vs. Northeastern, Oct. 22, 2005
- Minimum 30 completions – 91.43% (32 of 35) – Quinn Epperly of Princeton vs. Cornell, Nov. 2, 2013
- Minimum 50 completions – 94.64% (53 of 56) – Taron Dickens of Western Carolina vs. Wofford, Oct. 4, 2025 (set FCS record with 46 consecutive completions in this game)

== Most wins by a starting quarterback ==
=== Career ===
This table lists Division I FCS quarterbacks ranked by career wins in games in which they were the designated starting quarterback. Only games started are counted (relief appearances are excluded), and ties are included where applicable. For Mark Gronowski, only wins recorded at the FCS level are included in the table below; his 2025 season at Iowa (FBS)—during which he recorded nine wins as a starter—is noted separately and is not included in his FCS total. Easton Stick and Gronowski are tied for the most career wins by a starting quarterback at the FCS level with 49 each, followed by Brock Jensen with 47 wins, Cam Miller with 45 wins, and Armanti Edwards with 42 wins.

Among the quarterbacks listed, Edwards won the Walter Payton Award in 2008 and 2009 and Gronowski won the award in 2023. In addition, Stick, Jensen, Miller, Edwards, and Gronowski each led their teams to at least one FCS national championship as a starting quarterback.

George Southern's Raymond Gross is reported to have a 44–8 record as a starting quarterback. However, he was off the official NCAA notes list when Jensen broke Edwards’s 42-win mark in 2013, and he is therefore left off the table below due to limited game logs and participation charts.

#	Player	Seasons	GP	GS	W	L	T	%
1	Easton Stick	2014–2018	55	52	49	3	0	94.2
1	Mark Gronowski	2020–2024	55	55	49	6	0	89.1
3	Brock Jensen	2009–2013	54	52	47	5	0	90.4
4	Cam Miller	2020–2024	67	56	45	11	0	80.4
5	Armanti Edwards	2006–2009	51	49	42	7	0	85.7

=== Single season ===
This table lists FCS quarterbacks with the highest number of wins in a single season as a starter. Only victories earned while the player was the designated starting quarterback are counted (relief appearances are excluded), and ties are included where applicable. Only undefeated FCS seasons are included; seasons with 15 wins but one or more losses are excluded due to limitations in historical data and winning percentage calculations. Trey Lance led the 2019 North Dakota State to a perfect 16–0 season, the only FCS quarterback to reach 16 wins in a single season.

Single-season win totals have become more common in recent years due to expanded schedules and extended playoff formats, which give quarterbacks more opportunities to earn victories.

#	Player	Season	GP	GS	W	L	T	%
1	Trey Lance	2019	16	16	16	0	0	100.0
2	Raymond Gross	1989	15	15	15	0	0	100.0
2	Eric Kresser	1996	15	15	15	0	0	100.0
2	Brock Jensen	2013	15	15	15	0	0	100.0
2	Easton Stick	2018	15	15	15	0	0	100.0
2	Mark Gronowski	2023	15	15	15	0	0	100.0

== See also ==
- FBS passing leaders
