= Season of the Tiger =

Reality television series

- Genre: docudrama
- Starring: Landry "Blu" Carter; Bruce Eugene; Eva Grooms; LaShonda Harris; Mancel Perrill
- Country of origin: United States
- Original language: English
- No. of seasons: 1
- No. of episodes: 6

Production
- Running time: 30 minutes

Original release
- Network: BET
- Release: April 27 – June 1, 2006

Season of the Tiger is a six-part docudrama that follows members of the Grambling State University marching band and football team during the 2005 football season.

Produced by Daftfilms and Black Entertainment Television (BET), the series premiered on April 27, 2006, at 9:30 p.m., with subsequent episodes airing in the same Thursday time slot over the following five weeks.

Filmed in a documentary style, Season of the Tiger focuses on the lives of three marching band members and two football players as they pursue their goals while navigating the challenges of college life. The series is the second BET reality show to spotlight life at a historically black college or university (HBCU)—following College Hill—and the first to highlight the competitive environment of marching bands at HBCUs.

Among those featured in the docudrama is Grambling State standout quarterback and NFL prospect Bruce Eugene.

== Cast ==
- Landry "Blu" Carter — Wide receiver
- Bruce Eugene — Quarterback
- Eva Grooms — snare drummer/marching band member
- LaShonda Harris — band member/Master drill
- Mancel Perrill — former marching band member

== Cameo appearances ==
- Melvin Spears — Head coach of the Grambling State Tigers football team
- Dr. Larry J. Pannell — Director of Bands and Head of the Music Department at Grambling State University, known for leading the World Famed Tiger Marching Band during that era

== Episodes ==
No. overall	No. in season	Title	Original release date
1	1	"Striving for Excellence"	April 27, 2006
The series begins midway through the 2005 season as Grambling State University prepares for its homecoming game against the Texas Southern. The Tigers football team participates in intense practices while drill master Shunnie readies the World Famed Tiger Marching Band for its halftime performance. During the game, the band delivers a seamless routine at halftime. Quarterback Bruce Eugene takes a hard hit on the field, recalling a torn ACL from the previous season, but avoids injury. Grambling dominates the game with a 58–21 victory. Following the game, both the football team and the marching band celebrate their individual successes, while former band member Mancel hopes to rejoin the group.
2	2	"Priorities"	May 4, 2006
Quarterback Bruce Eugene meets with Grambling State head coach Melvin Spears over lunch to discuss his nutrition and the need to lose 26 pounds in preparation for the upcoming NFL Draft. NFL scout Alonzo joins the meeting and emphasizes the importance of fully seizing the opportunity before him. Bruce has one last indulgent meal before meeting with the school’s nutritionist, who instructs him to track and document his diet. At home, tensions rise as Bruce argues with his mother, Zina, over his weight and draft preparation. Meanwhile, former band member Mancel faces an upcoming court case related to a prior contraband incident and must pay a $200 fine within ten days to avoid jail. After attempting to sell his saxophone, Mancel receives financial help from his friend Don. During band practice, Shunnie requires Eva to arrive early at 6 a.m. to clean the drums, which she completes reluctantly. On the field, Grambling plays an away game against the Alabama State Hornets, leading 25–7 at halftime and ultimately winning 32–27 despite struggles in the second half. Bruce admits feeling nervous due to NFL scouts evaluating him.
3	3	"Doin' What I Gotta Do"	May 11, 2006
The episode opens with Grambling State return specialist Landry “Blu” Carter scoring on a kickoff return in the final seconds of a game. In reality, Grambling defeated Concordia (AL) 82–7. Off the field, Blu reflects on fatherhood and life with his newborn and girlfriend, Lathasha. Shunnie explores her skills as a recording artist in the studio, while Eva discusses how band participation helped her build confidence after struggling with insecurities as a teenager. She also faces academic challenges and must improve her coursework to remain in the band. Blu contends with financial pressure after receiving an eviction notice and reaches out to friends for assistance. Shunnie records her song “Club Hopper” at Plateau Records and later submits it to KGRM (91.5 FM) in hopes of receiving radio airplay. Eva initially scores 67 on a midterm but later earns 95 on her next exam. Blu secures the funds to pay his rent, pleasing his girlfriend, and Shunnie celebrates when her song finally airs on the radio after 1:00 a.m.
4	4	"New Beginnings"	May 18, 2006
The episode opens with a flashback to Hurricane Katrina in New Orleans, showing how Bruce Eugene helped arrange for his mother and family to relocate off campus in Grambling following the storm. In the present, Bruce reluctantly accompanies his mother on a five-hour trip to retrieve personal belongings, including trophies, from New Orleans. He revisits his childhood home and observes lingering damage from the hurricane, including vandalized vehicles and evidence of looting. Back at Grambling, Shunnie struggles to assert her authority as a drill sergeant, particularly with Eva, who challenges her leadership. Eva proposes a band challenge in the campus cafeteria, which later takes place outdoors. After a best-of-three contest using different instruments, Shunnie wins the final round with the backing of fellow band members, but Eva earns her respect, fostering mutual understanding. After returning to Grambling, Bruce and his mother receive a vehicle gift from U-Save Auto Rental of America. The company, which she had previously rented vehicles from and supported by bringing homemade gumbo to the staff, gifts her a vehicle, providing an uplifting moment after the hardships endured during the hurricane.
5	5	"How Bad Do You Want It?"	May 25, 2006
As preparations intensify for the Bayou Classic, both the football team and the World Famed Tiger Marching Band finalize arrangements for the rivalry game. Even before kickoff, quarterback Bruce Eugene tells local media he feels as though Grambling is already up 50–0. Dr. Larry J. Pannell makes an unannounced visit to Mancel’s residence, but Mancel does not answer. Having become disengaged, Mancel later attends band practice but observes from a distance. He asks Dr. Pannell for reinstatement, who emphasizes rules and accountability. Bruce skips a scheduled meeting with the nutritionist to socialize with classmates and stays out late with Landry “Blu” Carter and others. The following morning, Bruce oversleeps and misses the team’s 5:00 a.m. practice, arriving around 6:30 a.m., drawing criticism from the coaches, who describe his tardiness as selfish and detrimental to the team. Bruce reflects on letting his teammates down. On the band side, Shunnie conducts 4:30 a.m. roll call as buses prepare to depart, but Eva oversleeps and misses the bus, breaking down in tears.
6	6	"The Classic"	June 1, 2006
Eva receives a call confirming she can drive to the game with friends. Dr. Pannell and Shunnie express frustration that she is not traveling with the rest of the band. Mancel rides with friend and band member Kendrick, who has arranged a hotel for the event. Landry “Blu” Carter shares a hotel room with teammate AB, who misses his daughter, and is later surprised by a visit from his girlfriend, daughter, and sister. At the sold-out Battle of the Bands, Eva sneaks into formation and performs with fellow bandmates. Shunnie notes her participation is allowed at the discretion of the band directors. Mancel observes from a distance, while Dr. Pannell shows support by placing his arm around Eva and another band member. Following the show, Mancel and Pannell hug, signaling the possibility of Mancel returning to the band. On the football field, Bruce calls his own plays on the opening drive and scores a touchdown. Blu fumbles on a return, giving Southern possession, but the Tigers regain momentum and secure a 50–35 victory. Back in Grambling, Mancel meets with Dr. Pannell, who offers him the chance to rejoin the band provided his grades meet the required standards.

== Post‑season developments ==
The televised portion of Season of the Tiger concludes following Grambling State’s victory over Southern in the Bayou Classic. During the 2005 season, the Grambling State Tigers finished with an 11–1 record and captured the Southwestern Athletic Conference title with a 45–6 win over Alabama A&M in the championship game. Quarterback Bruce Eugene was named the game’s Most Valuable Player after completing 30 of 47 passes for 473 yards and six touchdowns.

Eugene also set the FCS career record for touchdown passes with 140, surpassing the mark previously held by Willie Totten.

Following his college career, Eugene entered the 2006 NFL draft but went undrafted. He signed as a free agent with the New Orleans Saints shortly after the draft and was released on June 15, 2006, without appearing in an NFL regular-season game.
