= Bruce Eugene =

American gridiron football player and coach (born 1982)

No. 10
- Position: Quarterback

Personal information
- Born: June 20, 1982 (age 44); New Orleans, Louisiana, U.S.
- Listed height: 6 ft 0 in (1.83 m)
- Listed weight: 283 lb (128 kg)

Career information
- College: Grambling State (2001–2005)
- NFL draft: 2006: undrafted

Career history

Playing
- New Orleans Saints (2006)*; Saskatchewan Roughriders (2006); Tampa Bay Buccaneers (2007); → Berlin Thunder (2007)
- * Offseason or practice squad member only

Coaching
- Alcorn State (2011) (QB)

Awards and highlights
- 2× SWAC Offensive Player of the Year (2002), (2005); 2× First-team All-SWAC (2002), (2005); NCAA (FCS) records: Most career TD passes: 140; Most career touchdowns responsible for: 159; Most career points responsible for: 960

Bruce Eugene (born June 20, 1982), nicknamed the "Round Mound of Touchdown", is an American former football quarterback. He played college football for the Grambling State Tigers, and set the NCAA Division I FCS record for passing touchdowns with 140.

== College career ==
Eugene began his collegiate career at Grambling State in 2001. Standing 6 feet 1 inch (1.85 m) tall and weighing 260 pounds (118 kg), he earned the nickname "Round Mound of Touchdown" due to his size and agility.

In 2002, Eugene started the season opener against McNeese but was benched the following week against Alcorn State. Coming off the bench in that game, he threw a game-winning touchdown, solidifying his status and eventually becoming the team's full-time starter. He led Grambling State to the SWAC championship that year, defeating Alabama A&M in the title game and was named SWAC Championship Game Most Valuable Player.

In 2003, Eugene continued as the starter, posting impressive statistics with 3,808 passing yards, 34 touchdowns, and 13 interceptions, along with 412 rushing yards and six touchdowns. His performance earned him a finalist spot for the Walter Payton Award, awarded annually to the top player in Division I-AA football.

In 2004, Eugene suffered a season-ending injury in the first game and missed the remainder of the year. He was subsequently granted a medical redshirt by the NCAA, giving him an additional year of eligibility.

Returning in 2005, Eugene led Grambling State to another SWAC championship, defeating Alabama A&M in the title game and earning Most Valuable Player honors. He passed for 4,360 yards and threw 56 touchdowns against just six interceptions, tying the FCS single-season record previously held by Willie Totten, while also rushing for 157 yards and three scores. As of 2026, Eugene holds the FCS career record for touchdown passes with 140, surpassing Totten’s long-standing mark. His remarkable season, along with his personal and team experiences, was featured in the six-episode BET docudrama Season of the Tiger, which also highlights Grambling State’s Tiger Marching Band and key teammates, offering a behind-the-scenes look at their lives both on and off the field.

Following his college career, Eugene participated in the NFL Combine, where he scored 41 on the Wonderlic Test, one of the highest scores ever recorded by a quarterback.

=== Statistics ===
Legend
	FCS record
**Bold**	Career high

Season	Team	Games			Passing								Rushing			
Season	Team	GP	GS	Record	Cmp	Att	Pct	Yds	Y/A	TD	Int	Rtg	Att	Yds	Avg	TD
2001	Grambling State	8	0	—	51	101	50.5	693	6.9	7	2	127.0	18	4	0.2	1
2002	Grambling State	13	12	10–2	269	543	49.5	4,483	8.3	43	16	139.1	137	535	3.9	9
2003	Grambling State	12	12	9–3	285	528	54.0	3,808	7.2	34	13	130.9	94	412	4.4	6
2004	Grambling State	1	1	0–1	13	29	44.8	169	5.8	0	1	86.9	12	99	8.3	0
2005	Grambling State	12	12	11–1	254	456	55.7	4,360	9.6	56	6	173.9	80	157	1.9	3
Career		46	37	30–7	872	1,657	52.6	13,513	8.2	140	38	144.4	341	1,207	3.5	19

== Professional career ==
Eugene was signed as a free agent by the New Orleans Saints within hours of the conclusion of the 2006 NFL draft. Bruce was released from the Saints on June 15, 2006. After a short stint with the Canadian Football League's Saskatchewan Roughriders he signed with the Tampa Bay Buccaneers on January 11, 2007.

Eugene was assigned to the Frankfurt Galaxy of the now-defunct NFL Europa for the 2007 season. The Galaxy were the defending World Bowl champion. At the end of training camp, Eugene was released by Frankfurt, then acquired by 3-time World Bowl champions Berlin Thunder, where he replaced third-string quarterback Walter Washington, who was released after camp, and injured back-up Omar Jacobs. He played his first game for the Thunder in the 16–7 loss to the Hamburg Sea Devils on April 22, 2007. Eugene played in seven games, starting two, overall during the 2007 season. He was placed on the reserve/non-football injury list on August 28, 2007. He was released by Tampa Bay on October 23, 2007. He was listed at 283 pounds on his NFL.com profile.

== Coaching career ==
Eugene moved into coaching, working at different schools in the Public Schools Athletic League (PSAL) in New York City. In 2011, he was the quarterbacks coach at Alcorn State University in Lorman, Mississippi. In 2012, he returned to PSAL as the head football coach at High School of Enterprise, Business, & Technology (also known as Grand Street Campus or Grand Street) in Brooklyn, New York.

In 2014, WGNO named him one of the best high school quarterbacks who played in the New Orleans metro in any of the previous 23 years. Eugene was a star quarterback at Walter Cohen High School of New Orleans.

In December 2015, Eugene became the first African-American coach to win the Public Schools Athletic League (PSAL) football city championship at the highest level. His team (Grand Street) defeated Eramus Hall 28–26 at Yankee Stadium. The New York Jets organization named him the 2015 "High School Coach Of The Year" and awarded his team $4,000.

== See also ==
- Jared Lorenzen
