= Ștefan Gheorghiu =

Ştefan Gheorghiu may refer to:

- Ștefan Gheorghiu (trade unionist) (1879–1914), Romanian activist
- Ștefan Gheorghiu (violinist) (1926–2010), Romanian violinist
- Ştefan Gheorghiu, the name under the Communist regime and until 1996 of Chichineţu village, Ciocile Commune, Brăila County, Romania
