= Bock-a-da-bock =

- Classification: Hand percussion Idiophone
- Hornbostel–Sachs classification: 111.142

The bock-a-da-bock is a musical instrument in the percussion family consisting of two small cymbals attached to each other by a set of metal tongs. They are typically played in a pair by one percussionist, much like the castanets. However, several other instruments of this type are also referred to as bock-a-da-bocks, such as the squash cymbal and the hand-sock cymbal.

== Origin ==
The predecessor of the bock-a-da-bock, the Ludwig Gladstone cymbal, was invented by Billy Gladstone and produced by the Ludwig Drum Company. Both the Ludwig Drum Company and their competitors elaborated upon Gladstone's design and produced a diversity of hand-held cymbals, including the bock-a-da-bock. The bock-a-da-bock is listed as a product of the Ludwig Drum Company in their 1928 catalog.

== Technique and use ==
The bock-a-da-bock is typically played in a pair like castanets, with one set of cymbals in each hand. There are other instruments like the bock-a-da-bock, such as the squash cymbal and hand-sock cymbal in the Ludwig Drum Company line. Though they are similar in construction, each are played differently. The hand-sock cymbal is mounted on spring loaded scissor tongs and is played by squeezing the tongs together. The squash cymbals, which are mounted on a simple fire tong, are held in one hand and hit with a drumstick in the other hand.

Due to recording limitations in the 1920s, the bock-a-da-bock was sometimes used as a substitute for a trap kit. As the trap kit developed into the modern drum kit around the 1930's, the bock-a-da-bock lost favor with the musicians of the time when compared to foot pedal operated hi-hats.

== Players ==
Noteworthy players of the bock-a-da-bock are Kaiser Marshall, who played it on several Fletcher Henderson records, and Zutty Singleton from Louis Armstrong's Hot Five who played a bock-a-da-bock on Armstrong's 1928 recording of "Sugar Foot Strut" (featured prominently in the introduction and ending) and "West End Blues".

== Examples of bock-a-da-bock use in charts ==
- "Black and Tan Fantasy" by Duke Ellington (1927)
- "Sugar Foot Strut" by Louis Armstrong (1928)
- "West End Blues" by Louis Armstrong (1928)
- "A Monday Date" by Louis Armstrong (1928)
- Video of a squash cymbal bock-a-da-bock
