= Tim DeMorat =

American football quarterback (born 1999)

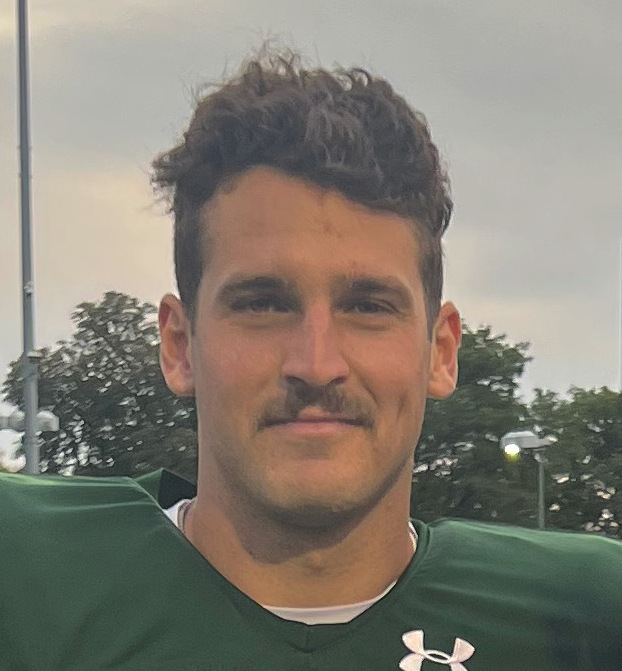
- DeMorat in 2022

Profile
- Position: Quarterback

Personal information
- Born: October 18, 1999 (age 27); Merritt Island, Florida, U.S.
- Listed height: 6 ft 4 in (1.93 m)
- Listed weight: 220 lb (100 kg)

Career information
- High school: Viera (Viera, Florida)
- College: Fordham (2018–2022)
- NFL draft: 2023: undrafted

Career history
- Washington Commanders (2023)*
- * Offseason or practice squad member only

Awards and highlights
- First-team FCS All-American (2022); 3× Patriot League Offensive Player of the Year (2020–2022); 4× All-Patriot League (2019–2022)
- Stats at Pro Football Reference

Tim DeMorat (born October 18, 1999) is an American former football quarterback. He played college football for the Fordham Rams, where he was a three-time Patriot League Offensive Player of the Year and named an FCS All-American in 2022. DeMorat is first in Fordham and Patriot League history in passing yards (13,454), passing touchdowns (123), and completions (1,032). DeMorat was briefly a member of the Washington Commanders in 2023.

== Early life ==
DeMorat was born on October 18, 1999, in Merritt Island, Florida. He attended Merritt Island High School for two years before transferring to Viera High School in Viera, Florida. He passed for over 2,400 yards with 23 touchdown passes and eight interceptions as a junior. Receiving only four FCS offers, DeMorat committed to play college football for the Rams at Fordham University in New York City.

He is the nephew of comedian Daniel Tosh.

== College career ==
DeMorat started eight games as a freshman at Fordham, completing 56.1% of his passes for 1,633 yards and 11 touchdowns. As a sophomore, he passed for 2,674 passing yards and 20 touchdowns and was named first team All-Patriot League. DeMorat's junior season was postponed from late 2020 to early 2021 due to the COVID-19 pandemic. He was named the Patriot League's Offensive Player of the Year after completing 92 of 129 pass attempts for 1,049 yards and five touchdowns. His 71% completion percentage led FCS.

DeMorat completed 234 passes for 3,214 yards and 31 touchdowns and repeated as the Patriot League Offensive Player of the Year as a senior. He used the extra year of eligibility granted to college athletes due to the COVID-19 pandemic and returned for a fifth season in 2022. That season, DeMorat was the runner-up for the Walter Payton Award after completing 326 passes for 4,891 yards and 56 touchdowns. Following the end of the season, he was invited to play in the 2023 Hula Bowl and East–West Shrine Bowl. DeMorat majored in communication and media studies at Fordham and finished first in school and Patriot League history in passing yards (13,454), passing touchdowns (123), and completions (1,032).

=== College statistics ===
Year	Team	Games	Passing								Rushing			
Year	Team	Games	Comp	Att	Pct	Yards	Avg	TD	Int	Rate	Att	Yards	Avg	TD
2018	Fordham	10	148	264	56.1	1,633	6.2	11	6	117.2	92	-143	-1.6	2
2019	Fordham	12	232	393	59.0	2,674	6.8	20	11	127.4	86	-158	-1.8	4
2020	Fordham	3	93	129	72.1	1,049	8.1	5	3	148.5	26	32	1.2	2
2021	Fordham	11	234	399	58.6	3,214	8.1	31	9	147.4	39	92	2.4	4
2022	Fordham	12	326	499	65.3	4,891	9.8	56	10	180.7	56	48	0.9	5
Career		48	1,033	1,685	61.3	13,461	8.0	123	39	147.9	299	-129	-0.4	17

== Professional career ==
Pre-draft measurables
Height	Weight	Arm length	Hand span	40-yard dash	10-yard split	20-yard split	20-yard shuttle	Three-cone drill	Vertical jump	Broad jump
6 ft 3 1/2 in (1.92 m)	219 lb (99 kg)	31 1/2 in (0.80 m)	9 1/2 in (0.24 m)	4.86 s	1.69 s	2.77 s	4.40 s	7.25 s	33.5 in (0.85 m)	9 ft 10 in (3.00 m)
All values from Fordham's Pro Day

DeMorat signed with the Washington Commanders as an undrafted free agent on May 1, 2023. DeMorat was released by the Commanders on July 25.

== Personal life ==
He retired from professional football and began a career in sales in early 2024, as well as offering private quarterback training for high school and college athletes.
