= Cameron Higgins =

American football player and coach (born 1988)

Biographical details
- Born: March 28, 1988 (age 38); Honolulu, Hawaii, U.S.

Playing career
- 2006–2010: Weber State
- Position: Quarterback

Coaching career (HC unless noted)
- 2012–2013: Kaiser HS (HI) (OC)
- 2014–2015: Kaiser HS (HI)

Head coaching record
- Overall: 9–9
- Tournaments: 1–2

Accomplishments and honors

Awards
- Big Sky Conference Offensive Player of the Year (2008); AP All-American 3rd Team (2008); Sports Network All-American 3rd Team (2008); All-Big Sky First Team (2008); 2× All-Big Sky Honorable Mention (2007, 2009)

Records
- Big Sky single-season passing yards (4,477, 2008); Big Sky single-season total offense (4,400, 2008); Weber State single-season touchdown passes (36, 2008)

Cameron James Kalana Higgins (born March 28, 1988) is an American former football quarterback. He played college football at Weber State. Higgins has led WSU to an 18-5 Big Sky Conference record and 22-11 overall record since taking over the starting position during the fourth game of his freshman season in 2007.

Higgins set school records for most career passing yards (12,274), most career touchdown passes (98), most career total touchdowns (105), most career pass completions (935), and career passing efficiency rating (144.5). His 98 career touchdown passes is also the most in Big Sky Conference history, and his 12,261 yards of total offense is the third most. Higgins currently holds several school passing records and two Big Sky records heading into his senior season.

In 2011, he earned the Weber State Male Athlete Career Achievement Award for his success with the 'Cats.

== Early life ==
Cameron Higgins was born on March 28, 1988. He played high school football at Saint Louis High School in Honolulu, Hawaii. He earned Honorable Mention All-State Honors in 2005. He helped his team defeat defending state champion Kamehameha High three times in a row. He Was named to the Hawai'i All-Star team which played the Samoa All-Stars.

== College career ==
=== 2007 ===
In 2007 as a freshman, Higgin's efficiency rating of 143.20 was the second best mark in the Big Sky Conference, behind league MVP Matt Nichols (156.5) of Eastern Washington. Higgins took over at quarterback for unsuccessful Alabama transfer Jimmy Barnes during the fourth game of the year. In WSU's 73-68 shootout win at Portland State University (a then-national record for combined points scored in a game), he passed for 334 yards and threw four touchdowns. In that same game, he also rushed for 106 yards and three touchdowns. His 440 total offensive yard effort was the 10th best single game effort in WSU football history. Higgins was named the 2007 Big Sky Conference Newcomer of the Year and was an Honorable Mention All-Big Sky selection.

=== 2008 ===
In Higgins' sophomore season, he put together one of the best seasons in the history of the Big Sky. His 4,477 passing yards set a single-season conference record, which also led the nation at the Football Championship Subdivision level. Also, Higgins' 36 touchdown passes tied for the national lead. WSU was selected to finish no better than 5th in the Big Sky by the coaches and media preceding the season and Higgins led WSU to a 7-1 conference mark and a share of the Big Sky title, WSU's first in 40 years. He was added to the Walter Payton Award watch list for the nation's best offensive player midway through the season after WSU's 5-0 conference mark. He would get enough votes for 6th place in the final voting. Higgins was voted Big Sky Conference Player of the Year, first-team All-Big Sky, and third-team All-American. Higgins' defining moment may have come when he orchestrated an impressive game in the opening round of the FCS playoffs, completing 21-33 passes (no interceptions) for 399 yards and two touchdowns in WSU’s stunning 49-35 road win at highly touted No. 3-ranked Cal Poly.

== Coaching career ==
In 2014, Higgins was named the head coach of Kaiser High School after Rich Miano stepped down. It was announced in 2016 that Higgins had stepped down as head coach.

=== Head coaching record ===
| Year | Team | Overall | Conference | Standing | Bowl/playoffs |
|---|---|---|---|---|---|
Henry J. Kaiser High School (Oahu Interscholastic Association) (2014–2015)
| 2014 | Kaiser | 5–4 | 3–3 | 4th (Red) | L OIA Division 1 Quarterfinal |
| 2015 | Kaiser | 4–5 | 4–3 | 3rd (Red) | L OIA Division 1 First Round |
| Kaiser HS: | | 9–9 | 7–6 | | |
| Total: | | 9–9 | | | |
National championship Conference title Conference division title or championship game berth

== Statistics ==
| Year | G-GS | ATT-CMP | PASS YDS | PASS TDS | INT | CMP % | RATING | RUSH YDS | ATT | RUSH TDS | AVG RUSH |
|---|---|---|---|---|---|---|---|---|---|---|---|
| 2007 | 11-7 | 233-131 | 1,959 | 17 | 9 | .562 | 143.20 | 172 | 52 | 4 | 3.3 |
| 2008 | 14-14 | 465-305 | 4,477 | 36 | 13 | .656 | 166.40 | -77 | 55 | 2 | -1.4 |
| 2009 | 12-12 | 454-289 | 3,321 | 30 | 20 | .637 | 138.10 | -122 | 34 | 0 | -3.6 |
| TOTAL | 37-33 | 1,152-725 | 9,757 | 83 | 42 | .629 | 149.20 | -27 | 141 | 6 | -0.2 |
Source: Big Sky Conference

== Honors ==
In 2026 Weber State announced that Higgins would be inducted into their hall of fame, in honor of his success as their quarterback. As of that year, he still holds the Wildcats single-season record for passing touchdowns.
