= Florea Fătu =

Romanian footballer

Personal information
- Date of birth: 17 July 1924
- Place of birth: Ciocile, Romania
- Date of death: 11 December 1995 (aged 71)
- Position: Striker

Senior career*
Years	Team	Apps	(Gls)
1942–1947	Juventus București (Note: The Divizia A 1940–41 was the last season before World War II and the Divizia A 1946–47 was the first one after, so the appearances and goals scored during this period for Juventus București are not official with the exception of the 1945–46 regional championship.)	33	(20)
1947–1948	CSCA București	32	(6)
1949–1954	Petrolul Ploiești (Note: The statistics for the 1953 Divizia B season are unavailable.)	81	(20)
Total		146	(46)

International career
1947	Romania	1	(0)
- * Club domestic league appearances and goals

Florea Fătu (17 July 1924 – 11 December 1995) was a Romanian football striker. He was a part of CSCA București's team that won the first match in the history of the club.

== International career ==
Florea Fătu played one friendly game at international level for Romania, coming as a substitute at half-time when he replaced Nicolae Dumitrescu in a 2–1 victory against Poland played on the Polish Army Stadium from Warsaw.

== Honours ==
Petrolul Ploiești

- Divizia B: 1953
- Cupa României runner-up: 1952
