= Peter Pujals =

American football player (born 1995)

No. 6, 13
- Position: Quarterback

Personal information
- Born: January 23, 1995 (age 31); Glenview, Illinois, U.S.
- Listed height: 6 ft 2 in (1.88 m)
- Listed weight: 215 lb (98 kg)

Career information
- High school: Loyola (Wilmette, Illinois)
- College: Holy Cross (2013–2017)
- NFL draft: 2018: undrafted

Career history
- Minnesota Vikings (2018)*; Atlanta Legends (2019)
- * Offseason or practice squad member only

Awards and highlights
- First Team All-Patriot League (2015); Second Team All-ECAC (2015); Second Team All-Patriot League (2014, 2017); Patriot League Rookie of the Year (2013)

Career AAF statistics
- Passing attempts: 6
- Passing completions: 4
- Completion percentage: 66.7
- TD–INT: 0–0
- Passing yards: 17
- Passer rating: 70.1

Peter Enrique Pujals (born January 23, 1995) is an American former football quarterback. He played college football for the Holy Cross Crusaders. After going undrafted in the 2018 NFL draft, he signed with the Minnesota Vikings of the National Football League (NFL). He also played for the Atlanta Legends of the Alliance of American Football (AAF).

== College career ==
Pujals finished his Holy Cross career second in most statistical career categories behind Dominic Randolph. He was voted as a four-time team captain while also earned Second Team All-Patriot League honors twice and First Team once.

=== Statistics ===
Year	Team	Games		Passing								Rushing			
Year	Team	GP	Record	Comp	Att	Pct	Yards	Avg	TD	Int	Rate	Att	Yards	Avg	TD
2013	Holy Cross	10	3–7	211	332	63.6	2,261	6.8	19	8	134.8	136	469	3.5	8
2014	Holy Cross	12	4–8	225	375	60.0	2,353	6.3	10	12	115.1	170	705	4.2	6
2015	Holy Cross	11	6–5	286	484	59.1	3,195	6.6	28	11	129.1	92	319	3.5	1
2016	Holy Cross	4	1–3	111	175	63.4	1,110	6.3	10	5	129.9	31	148	4.8	1
2017	Holy Cross	11	4–7	238	430	55.3	2,776	6.5	17	7	119.4	82	151	1.8	3
Career		48	18−30	1,071	1,796	59.6	11,695	6.5	84	43	125.0	511	1,792	3.5	19

== Professional career ==
Pre-draft measurables
Height	Weight	Arm length	Hand span	40-yard dash	10-yard split	20-yard split	20-yard shuttle	Three-cone drill	Vertical jump	Broad jump
6 ft 1 in (1.85 m)	213 lb (97 kg)	32 in (0.81 m)	9 5/8 in (0.24 m)	4.60 s	1.69 s	2.69 s	4.10 s	6.90 s	38 in (0.97 m)	9 ft 8 in (2.95 m)
All values from Pro Day.

=== Minnesota Vikings ===
After going undrafted in the 2018 NFL draft, Pujals signed with the Minnesota Vikings of the National Football League (NFL) on April 28, 2018.

Pujals made his lone preseason appearance against the Tennessee Titans after not playing in the first three games. He came into the game in the fourth quarter with 5:55 remaining. He completed his first pass attempt for eight yards to Jeff Badet before throwing an incompletion and fumbling a few plays later. He ended the game by taking the final kneel downs at the end of the team's 13–3 win.

Pujals was released by the Vikings on August 31, 2018.

=== Atlanta Legends ===
Pujals was drafted in the third round of the AAF quarterback draft to the Atlanta Legends of the Alliance of American Football (AAF).

Pujals played in three games against the Arizona Hotshots, San Antonio Commanders, and Birmingham Iron. He recorded his only stats against the Commanders as he went four of six for seventeen yards.

Pujals did not start any games for the Legends and had his contract terminated when the league suspended operations prior to the end of the season.

=== Career statistics ===
Year	League	Team	Games			Passing								
Year	League	Team	GP	GS	Record	Cmp	Att	Pct	Yds	Y/A	Lng	TD	Int	Rtg
2018	NFL	MIN	DNP											
2019	AAF	ATL	3	0	—	4	6	66.7	17	2.8	6	0	0	70.1
Career			3	0	—	4	6	66.7	17	2.8	6	0	0	70.1
