= Snare drum technique =

Percussive instrument technique

Snare technique is the technique used to play a snare drum.

It is studied as an end to itself by snare drummers, and as a way of developing stick control skill by kit drummers and players of other auxiliary percussion instruments. Snare drum is the first instrument that most percussionists learn to play.

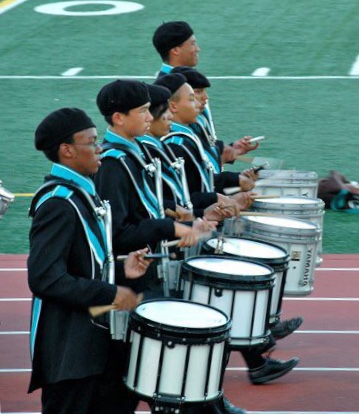
Snare drummers in a high school marching band playing with traditional grip

== Grips ==
There are two kinds of grip used in snare technique: matched grip, in which both hands hold the sticks in an overhand grip, and traditional grip, in which one hand uses an overhand grip and the other an underhand grip. Traditional grip is almost exclusively used on snare drum and concert bass drum, while matched grip is used on all percussion instruments. Traditional grip is also primarily used in drum corps–style marching environments, such as Drum Corps International.

== Rudiments ==
Snare drum technique is learned mainly by learning specific sequences of drumstick strokes, each of them known as a drum rudiment and most of them short. Examples of rudiments are the paradiddle and the drum roll. Rudiments are often practiced in the open, closed, open method, in which the player increases and then decreases the tempo of the pattern in a steady methodical way. Rudiments can be built up into larger phrases, as in the purely rudimental playing of military and marching bands, or used for technical mastery by drum kit players or orchestral percussionists.

== Strokes ==
Snare drumming is accomplished with a series of individual strokes, which fall into a small number of major categories, such as Up, Down, Full, or Tap, and are a more basic level of organization than rudiments.

== Rolls ==
A distinctive feature of snare drumming is the use of rolls, or sustained sounds made from a series of repetitive notes placed close together. Rolls can be played open, as in single- or double-stroke rolls, or closed, as in the orchestral or concert roll.

== Techniques and styles ==
There are many snare drum techniques, which vary by context or music being performed. Snare drum can be played with sweeping and stirring motions if played with brushes. It can also be played in a snappy and light manner, as in the Pipe band tradition of Scotland. A much heavier approach is used by American drum corps. Ancient fife and drum corps used a flowing whip-like method now known as the Moeller method after its 20th century champion Sanford A. Moeller, which is also sometimes employed by drum kit players. A contrasting style of playing, using a lot of rebound from the head, is often called the Gladstone method, after Billy Gladstone.
