= 2023 Hula Bowl =

American college football all-star game

2023 Tunnel to Towers Foundation Hula Bowl
- 77th Hula Bowl
Team Kai	Team Aina
16	13
Head coach: Brian Billick	Head coach: Mike Smith
	1	2	3	4	Total
Team Kai	0	3	7	6	16
Team Aina	0	7	6	0	13
- Date: January 14, 2023
- Season: 2022
- Stadium: FBC Mortgage Stadium
- Location: Orlando, Florida
- MVP: Offense: Holton Ahlers (QB, East Carolina); Defense: Jordan Ferguson (DE, Middle Tennessee)
- Referee: Amanda Sauer
- Attendance: 8,314

United States TV coverage
- Network: CBS Sports Network
- Announcers: Jamie Seh (play-by-play), Brian Baldinger (color), Nick Lowery (sideline), Smacker Miles (sideline)

The 2023 Hula Bowl was a postseason college football all-star game played on January 14, 2023, with kickoff at 12:00 noon EST, at FBC Mortgage Stadium in Orlando, Florida. It was the first all-star contest of the 2022–23 bowl games and, while not restricted to FBS players, one of the final games of the 2022 FBS football season. Television coverage was provided by CBS Sports Network. This was the second playing of the Hula Bowl outside of Hawaii, due to Aloha Stadium near Honolulu being closed for renovations. The game rostered players into Aina and Kai teams, the words for land and sea in the Hawaiian language. Through sponsorship from the Tunnel to Towers Foundation, the game was officially named the 2023 Tunnel to Towers Foundation Hula Bowl.

== Players ==
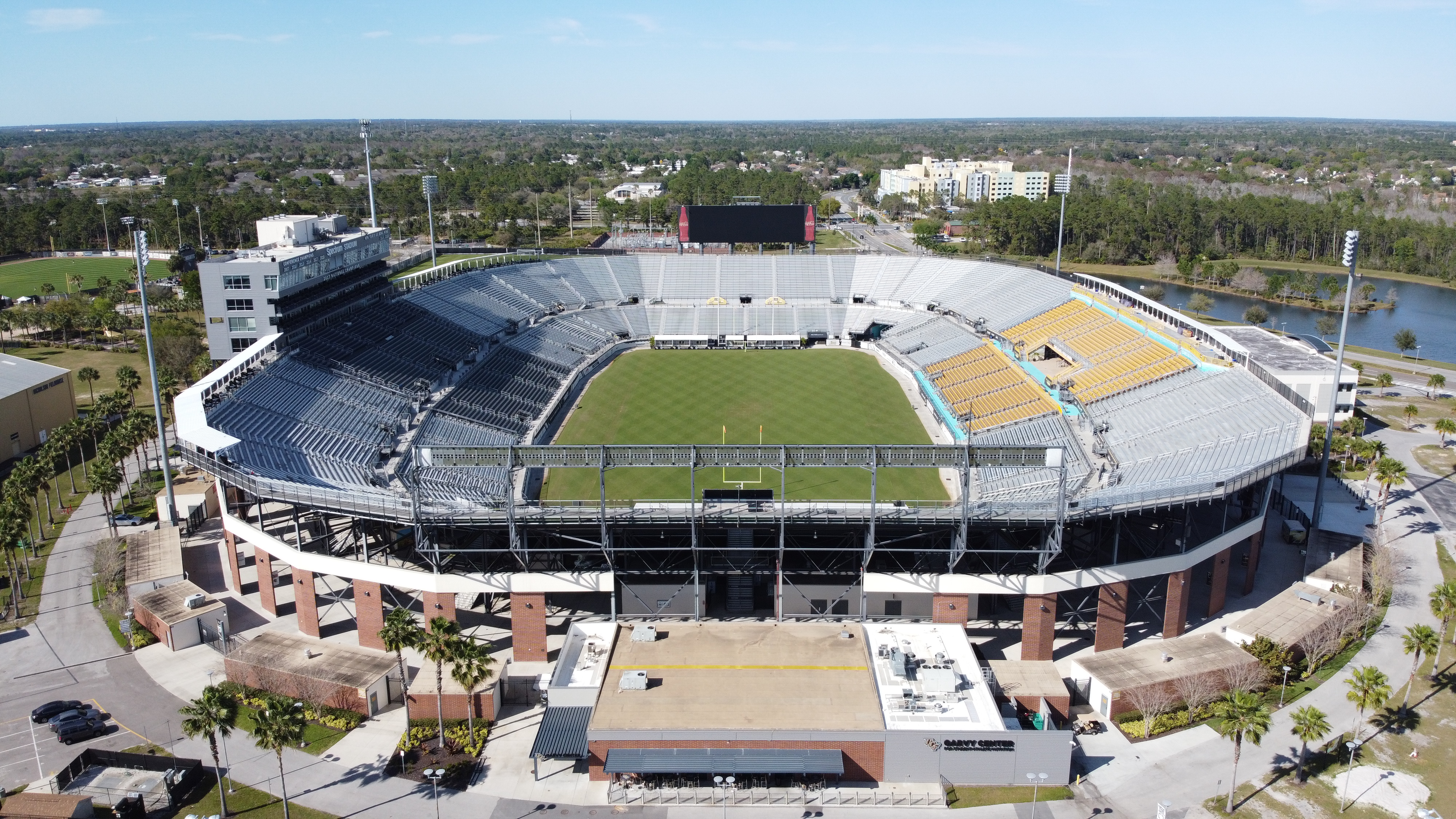
The Bounce House in February 2020

Selected players are listed below. Full roster are available online (link); note that a number may be shared by an offensive and defensive player.

Two players from Japan participated in the game: Kento Ogushi (CB, Waseda University) and Mikito Itokawa (WR, Kwansei Gakuin University).

=== Team Aina ===
Coach: Mike Smith

No.	Player	Position	HT/WT	College	Notes
17	Tim DeMorat	QB	6'3/224	Fordham	
16	Chase Brice	QB	6'2/235	Appalachian State	
11	Adrian Martinez	QB	6'2/219	Kansas State	
5	Isaiah Bowser	RB	6'0/222	UCF	
3	Khalan Laborn	RB	5'9/198	Marshall	
7	Charles McClelland	RB	5'11/188	Cincinnati	

=== Team Kai ===
Coach: Brian Billick

No.	Player	Position	HT/WT	College	Notes
10	Holton Ahlers	QB	6'3/237	East Carolina	
12	Sean Clifford	QB	6'2/217	Penn State	
10	Tanner Morgan	QB	6'0/200	Minnesota	
34	Christopher Brooks	RB	6'0/232	BYU	
2	Elijah Dotson	RB	5'9/199	Northern Colorado (FCS)	
21	Toa Taua	RB	5'8/208	Nevada	
6	Calvin Tyler	RB	5'7/211	Utah State	

== Game summary ==
Team Kai wore white uniforms and Team Aina wore dark uniforms. The game was played using National Football League (NFL) rules; however, punt returns were not allowed. In place of kickoffs, teams automatically started possessions at their own 25-yard line.

The game was officiated by an all-female crew, assigned by the NFL "from their development pool of college officials." Referee Amanda Sauer had previously served as the center judge in the 2022 Fenway Bowl.

2023 Hula Bowl

Quarter	1	2	3	4	Total
Kai	0	3	7	6	16
Aina	0	7	6	0	13

at FBC Mortgage Stadium • Orlando, Florida

- Date: Saturday, January 14, 2023
- Game time: 12:00 p.m. EST
- Game weather: Sunny• Temperature: 48 °F (9 °C) • Wind 15 mph (24 km/h) northwest
- Game attendance: 8,314
- Referee: Amanda Sauer
- TV: CBS Sports Network
- Report 1 Report 2

Game information

First quarter

- No scoring

Second quarter

- Kai (5:03) – Chris Dunn 30-yard field goal; Kai 3–0
- Aina (0:46) – Ryan Miller 8-yard touchdown reception from Adrian Martinez; Jack Podlesny kick good; Aina 7–3

Third quarter

- Kai (0:20) – Michael Ezeike 20-yard touchdown reception from Holton Ahlers; Tanner Brown kick good; Kai 10–7
- Aina (0:00) – Trea Shropshire 75-yard touchdown reception from Tim DeMorat; Chris Dunn kick failed (wide left); Aina 13–10

Fourth quarter

- Kai (7:00) – Jack Podlesny 26-yard field goal; Tied 13–13
- Kai (1:55) – Tanner Brown 27-yard field goal; Kai 16–13

Note: bowl organizers had the three placekickers (Dunn, Podlesny, and Brown) rotate through opportunities to kick during the game, regardless of team affiliations.

== See also ==
- 2023 NFL draft
