= Tunnel to Towers Foundation =

American charitable organization

- Formation: 2001
- Founded: December 2001
- Type: Nonprofit 501(c)(3) Corporation
- Tax ID no.: 02-0554654
- Purpose: Honoring the sacrifice of FDNY Firefighter Stephen Siller, who laid down his life to save others on September 11, 2001
- Headquarters: New York
- Location: 2361 Hylan Boulevard, Staten Island, New York 10306
- CEO: Frank Siller
- Website: Official website

The Tunnel to Towers Foundation is an American non-profit organization. It was founded in tribute to New York Fire Department firefighter Stephen Siller, who was killed during the September 11 attacks. The foundation was established in 2001 and received 501(c)(3) status in 2003. The foundation helps families of September 11 first responders and veterans, in part from funds raised through nationwide charity runs.

== History ==
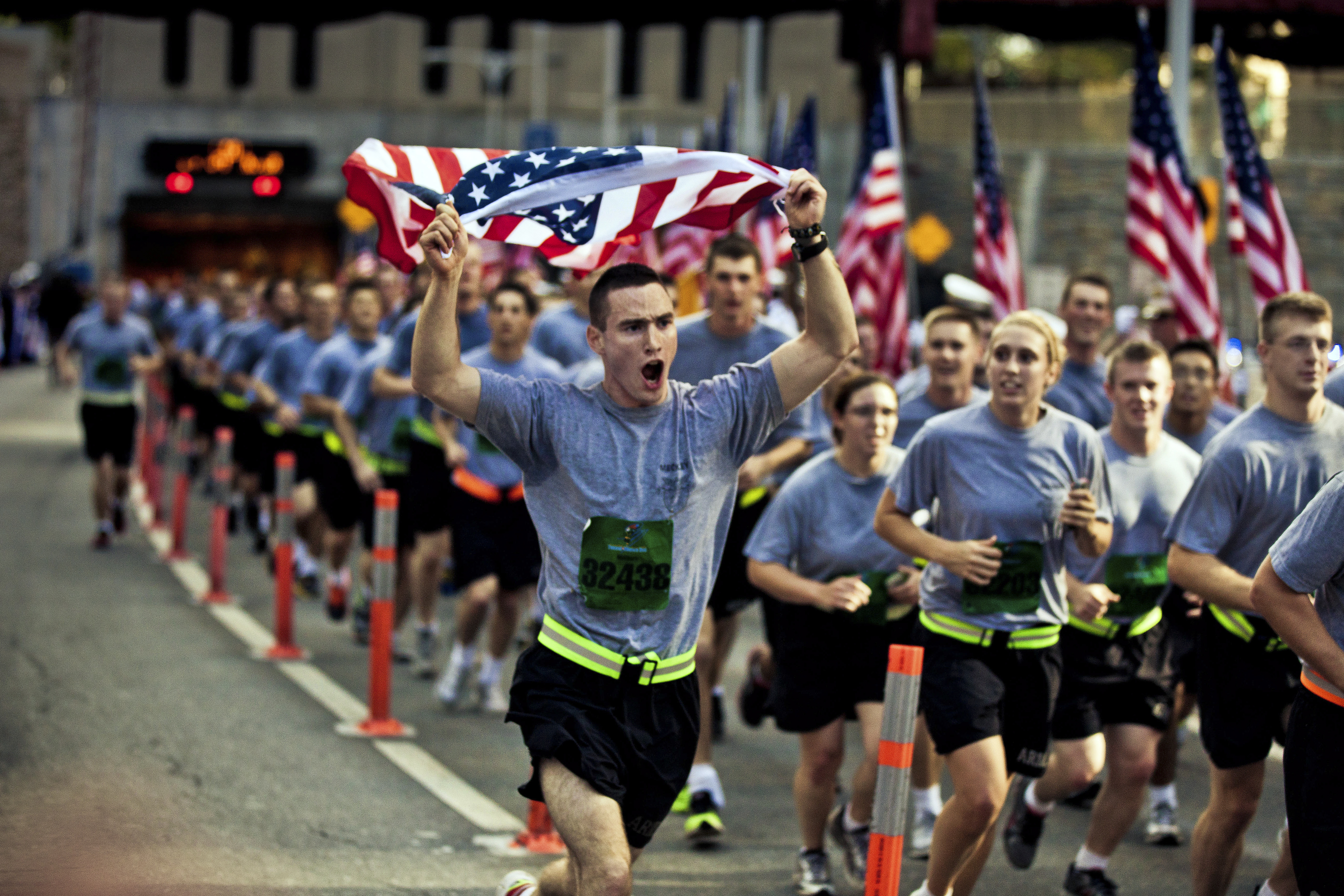
The U.S. Army - New York City Tunnel to Towers Run

The Tunnel to Towers Foundation was established in December 2001 in tribute to New York Fire Department firefighter Stephen Siller, who was killed during the September 11 attacks. The foundation helps families of September 11 first responders and veterans, in part from funds raised through nationwide charity runs. It became a tax-exempt 501(c)(3) non-profit organization in 2003.

The name of the organization commemorates Siller's run to the World Trade Center before being killed. He had driven his truck to the entrance of the Brooklyn–Battery Tunnel, but found that it had been closed for security purposes. Determined to carry out his duty, Siller strapped his gear to his back and raced on foot through the tunnel to the Twin Towers, a distance of three miles, where he lost his life while saving others.

The foundation operates the Let Us Do Good Village, a 100-home area in Land O'Lakes, Florida, explicitly for veterans, first responders, and their families. Since 2021, the foundation had paid some thirty mortgages for families of first responders across the United States, including the family of Darian Jarrott. The foundation sponsored the 2023 Hula Bowl; the Hula Bowl donated ten dollars from each ticket to the foundation.

The foundation faced controversy in 2024 for funneling money raised ostensibly for families of September 11 first responders to provide financial assistance to former Mayor of New York City Rudy Giuliani.

The foundation is headquartered in Staten Island, New York.
