= Gage Gubrud =

American gridiron football player (born 1995)

Profile
- Position: Quarterback

Personal information
- Born: May 15, 1995 (age 31); Portland, Oregon, U.S.
- Listed height: 6 ft 2 in (1.88 m)
- Listed weight: 195 lb (88 kg)

Career information
- High school: McMinnville (McMinnville, Oregon)
- College: Eastern Washington; Washington State

Career history
- 2021: BC Lions*
- * Offseason or practice squad member only

Awards and highlights
- First-team All-Big Sky Conference (2016); Second-team All-Big Sky Conference (2017); Big Sky Conference Co-Offensive Player of the Year (2016); Touchdown Club of Columbus FCS Player of the Year (2016); Walter Payton Award Finalist (2016); Second-team FCS All-American (AP, AFCA, STATS) (2016); FCS single-season passing yards record (5,160)
- Stats at CFL.ca

Gage Gubrud (born May 15, 1995) is an American former football quarterback. He played college football for the Eastern Washington Eagles and the Washington State Cougars.

== Early life ==
Gubrud graduated from McMinnville High School in McMinnville, Oregon, in 2014. As a senior, Gubrud completed 59.7 percent of his passes, with 18 touchdowns and 13 interceptions. He led the Grizzlies to the second round of the OSAA 6A Playoffs and also earned All-Pacific Conference honors.

== College career ==
Gubrud was lightly recruited, receiving zero Division I scholarship offers. Gubrud would eventually decide to join Eastern Washington as a preferred walk-on, in the process turning down a scholarship offer from Division III school Linfield in Oregon.

=== 2014–15 ===
Gubrud redshirted in 2014. In 2015, he saw action primarily as a kick holder. Gubrud played in one game as a quarterback, completing 7-of-13 passes for 66 yards and an interception in a loss to Montana.

=== 2016 ===
In 2016, Gubrud won the starting quarterback job, beating out former starter and senior, Jordan West. In his first career start against Washington State, Gubrud went 34-for-40 for 474 yards and five touchdowns in a 45–42 upset win.

Gubrud would lead Eastern to a 12–2 season and an appearance in the FCS Playoffs Semifinals. He finished 2016 with an FCS single-season record 5,160 passing yards and 48 touchdowns. Gubrud also led the team with 606 rushing yards and five touchdowns. Gubrud totaled 5,766 yards of total offense, which was just 33 yards shy of the FCS single-season record set by Steve McNair in 1994.

Gubrud was named the Co-Big Sky Conference Offensive Player of the Year, along with teammate Cooper Kupp. He was also named the FCS Player of the Year by the Touchdown Club of Columbus. Gubrud was also a finalist for the Walter Payton Award.

=== Statistics ===
Legend
	FCS record
**Bold**	Career high

Season	Team	Games			Passing								Rushing			
Season	Team	GP	GS	Record	Cmp	Att	Pct	Yds	Y/A	TD	Int	Rtg	Att	Yds	Avg	TD
2015	Eastern Washington	4	0	—	7	13	53.8	66	5.1	0	1	81.1	12	31	2.6	1
2016	Eastern Washington	14	13	11–2	386	570	67.7	5,160	9.1	48	14	166.6	134	606	4.5	5
2017	Eastern Washington	10	10	6–4	261	422	61.8	3,342	7.9	26	12	143.0	82	236	2.9	5
2018	Eastern Washington	5	5	4–1	99	160	61.9	1,416	8.8	13	5	143.0	31	169	5.4	2
2019	Washington State	2	0	—	10	13	76.9	89	6.8	1	0	159.8	0	0	0	0
FCS career		33	28	21–7	753	1,165	64.6	9,984	8.6	87	32	155.8	259	1,042	4.0	13
FBS career		2	0	0–0	10	13	76.9	89	6.8	1	0	159.8	0	0	0.0	0

== Professional career ==
On January 11, 2021, it was announced that Gubrud had signed with the BC Lions. He retired on March 5, 2021.
