= Jimmy Garoppolo =

American football player (born 1991)

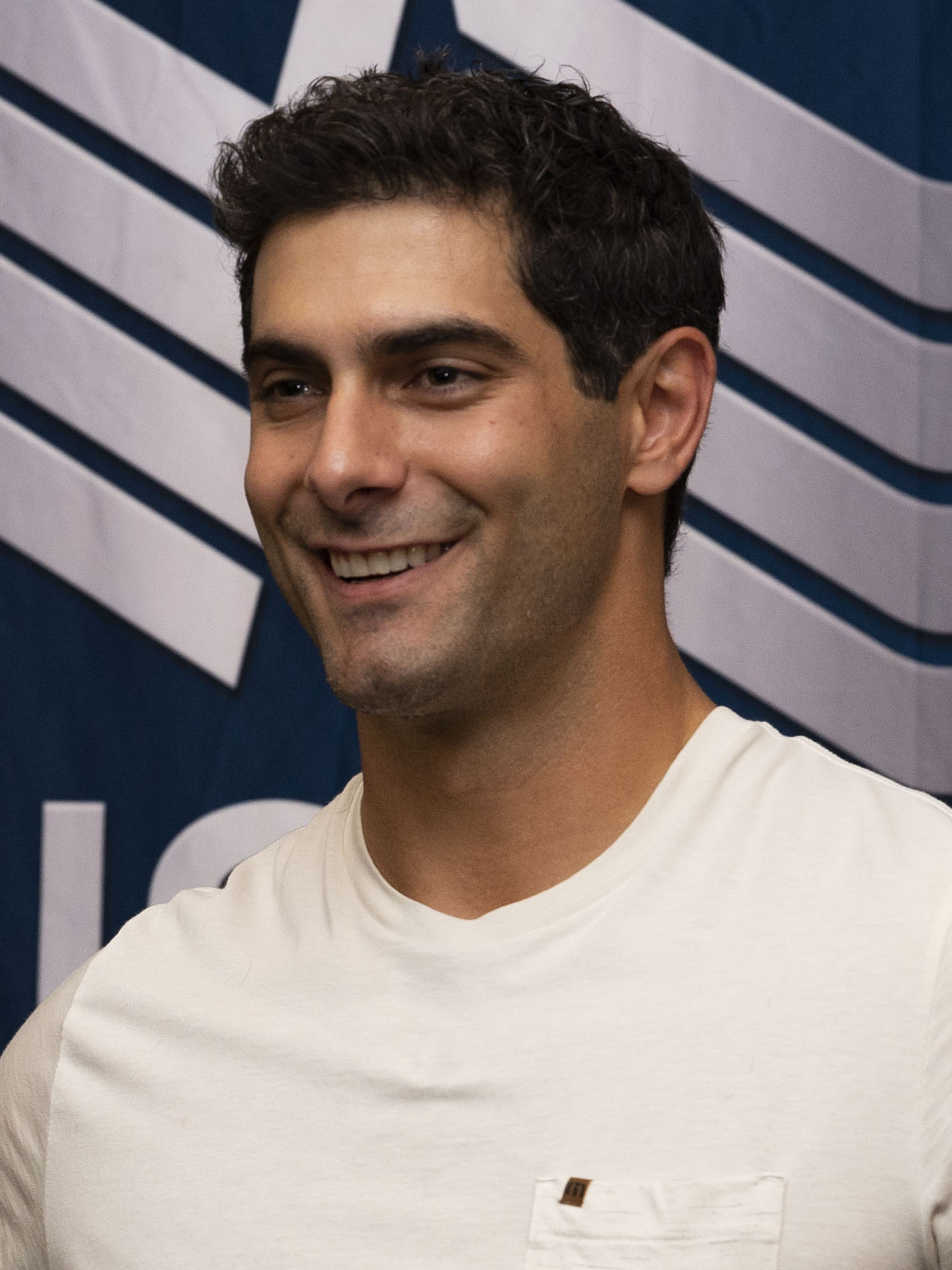
- Garoppolo in 2023

Profile
- Position: Quarterback

Personal information
- Born: November 2, 1991 (age 35); Arlington Heights, Illinois, U.S.
- Listed height: 6 ft 2 in (1.88 m)
- Listed weight: 226 lb (103 kg)

Career information
- High school: Rolling Meadows (Rolling Meadows, Illinois)
- College: Eastern Illinois (2010–2013)
- NFL draft: 2014: 2nd round, 62nd overall pick

Career history
- New England Patriots (2014–2017); San Francisco 49ers (2017–2022); Las Vegas Raiders (2023); Los Angeles Rams (2024–2025)

Awards and highlights
- 2× Super Bowl champion (XLIX, LI); Walter Payton Award (2013); OVC Offensive Player of the Year (2013); First-team All-OVC (2013); Second-team All-OVC (2012)

Career NFL statistics as of 2025
- Passing attempts: 1,936
- Passing completions: 1,304
- Completion percentage: 67.4%
- TD–INT: 96–52
- Passing yards: 15,828
- Passer rating: 97.6
- Rushing yards: 259
- Rushing touchdowns: 7
- Stats at Pro Football Reference

James Garoppolo (born November 2, 1991) is an American professional football quarterback. Nicknamed "Jimmy G", he played college football for the Eastern Illinois Panthers, winning the Walter Payton Award in 2013 and setting school records for career passing yards and passing touchdowns. Garoppolo was selected in the second round of the 2014 NFL draft by the New England Patriots, where he spent his first four seasons as Tom Brady's backup and was a member of two Super Bowl-winning teams.

Traded to the San Francisco 49ers near the end of the 2017 season, Garoppolo helped revitalize a 1–10 team by winning the last five games of the year. His most successful year was in 2019 when he guided the 49ers to their conference's top seed and an appearance in Super Bowl LIV. Garoppolo also helped lead them to an NFC Championship Game appearance in the 2021 season. However, his San Francisco tenure was afflicted by injuries, which caused him to miss most of the 2018 and 2020 seasons. After suffering another season-ending injury in 2022, Garoppolo spent the following year with the Las Vegas Raiders and his next two as a backup with the Los Angeles Rams.

== Early life and family ==
Garoppolo was born and raised in Arlington Heights, Illinois. He is the third of four sons born to Denise (née Malec) and Tony Garoppolo Sr., a retired electrician. His older brothers are Tony Jr., an architect; Mike, a teacher; and his younger brother is Billy. Garoppolo is from a "tight-knit, big Italian family"; his paternal grandparents, Anthony and Rose Garoppolo, were both Italian immigrants, while his maternal grandparents, Theodore J. Malec and Harriet D. Seidel, were of Polish and German descent, respectively.

Garoppolo attended Rolling Meadows High School in Rolling Meadows, Illinois, where he was a quarterback and linebacker for the Mustangs football team. Garoppolo played in 19 games at quarterback during his junior and senior seasons, and passed for 3,136 yards and 25 touchdowns. As a teenager, Garoppolo was an acquaintance of future right-wing political activist and media personality Charlie Kirk, who was two years younger than Garoppolo and a quarterback at a nearby Wheeling High School, and both took part in the former NFL quarterback Jeff Christensen quarterback and wide receiver training program called Throw It Deep, with a clip of Garoppolo and Kirk throwing footballs side by side later went viral online in 2026. In addition to football, Garoppolo was also a pitcher for Rolling Meadows, stating: "Baseball was my first love when I was a little kid." A two-star recruit, he accepted an offer to play football at Eastern Illinois over offers from Illinois State and Montana State.

== College career ==
Garoppolo played football for the Eastern Illinois Panthers from 2010 to 2013. As a freshman, he started eight games, passing for 1,639 yards and 14 touchdowns and earning All-Ohio Valley Conference Newcomer Team honors playing under head coach Bob Spoo. Garoppolo went on to start every remaining game during his time at Eastern Illinois, passing for 2,644 yards and 20 touchdowns as a sophomore, 3,823 yards and 31 touchdowns as a junior, and 5,050 yards and 53 touchdowns as a senior, breaking the school record for career pass completions previously held by former Dallas Cowboys quarterback Tony Romo.

In 2013, Garoppolo, playing his senior season in head coach Dino Babers's up-tempo no-huddle offense, won the Walter Payton Award, given to the most outstanding offensive player in the Division I Football Championship Subdivision. He was also named the 2013–14 OVC Male Athlete of the Year and the 2013 College Football Performance FCS National Quarterback of the Year.

== Professional career ==
=== Pre-draft ===
Pre-draft measurables
Height	Weight	Arm length	Hand span	Wingspan	40-yard dash	10-yard split	20-yard split	20-yard shuttle	Three-cone drill	Vertical jump	Broad jump	Wonderlic
6 ft 2 1/4 in (1.89 m)	226 lb (103 kg)	31 in (0.79 m)	9 1/4 in (0.23 m)	6 ft 3 3/8 in (1.91 m)	4.97 s	1.78 s	2.91 s	4.26 s	7.04 s	30.5 in (0.77 m)	9 ft 2 in (2.79 m)	29
All values from NFL Combine

Represented by Don Yee, Garoppolo was considered one of the better quarterback prospects for the 2014 NFL draft.

=== New England Patriots ===
==== 2014 season ====
The New England Patriots selected Garoppolo in the second round (62nd overall) of the draft. He was the first player from the Football Championship Subdivision drafted in 2014, and the highest-drafted quarterback the Patriots had selected since Drew Bledsoe was picked first overall in 1993. On June 2, 2014, Garoppolo signed a four-year, $3,483,898 contract with $1,103,744 guaranteed and an $853,744 signing bonus.

During Week 4 against the Kansas City Chiefs, Garoppolo made his NFL debut in the fourth quarter of the 41–14 road loss. Garoppolo led the Patriots on a scoring drive, which led to his first NFL touchdown on a 13-yard pass to tight end Rob Gronkowski on his first drive. Garoppolo finished the game completing six of seven passes for 70 yards and the aforementioned touchdown, posting a passer rating of 147.9.

As a rookie, Garoppolo played in six games. He completed 19 of 27 passes for 182 yards and a touchdown with a 101.2 passer rating and had 10 carries for nine yards. While Garoppolo did not take any snaps in the Patriots' Super Bowl XLIX victory, he was credited with helping to prepare the Patriots' defense for Seattle Seahawks quarterback Russell Wilson.

==== 2015 season ====
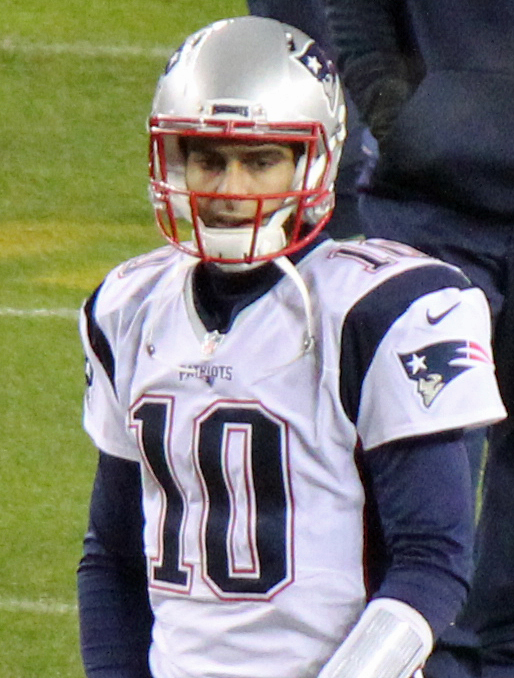
Garoppolo in 2015

In 2015, Garoppolo appeared in five games in relief roles. He completed one of four passes for six yards and a 39.6 passer rating.

==== 2016 season ====
After starting quarterback Tom Brady was suspended by the league for four games for Deflategate, head coach Bill Belichick named Garoppolo the starting quarterback for the 2016 season, and he was expected to stand in for Brady for all four games.

During the narrow season-opening 23–21 road victory over the Arizona Cardinals, Garoppolo completed 24-of-33 passes for 264 yards and a touchdown. In the next game against the Miami Dolphins, he threw for 234 yards and three touchdowns before leaving the eventual 31–24 victory during the second quarter with a shoulder injury. It was later revealed that Garoppolo sprained his AC joint after a hit by Dolphins' linebacker Kiko Alonso that kept him out the next two games, giving the starting job to rookie Jacoby Brissett before Brady returned from suspension in Week 5. During Super Bowl LI, while active for the Patriots' 34–28 comeback overtime victory over the Atlanta Falcons, Garoppolo once again did not take any snaps (as in Super Bowl XLIX).

==== 2017 season ====
During the offseason, Garoppolo was the subject of several trade rumors with the Chicago Bears and Cleveland Browns being cited most commonly as potential suitors. However, no trade occurred and Garoppolo remained with the Patriots going into the 2017 season.

=== San Francisco 49ers ===
==== 2017 season ====
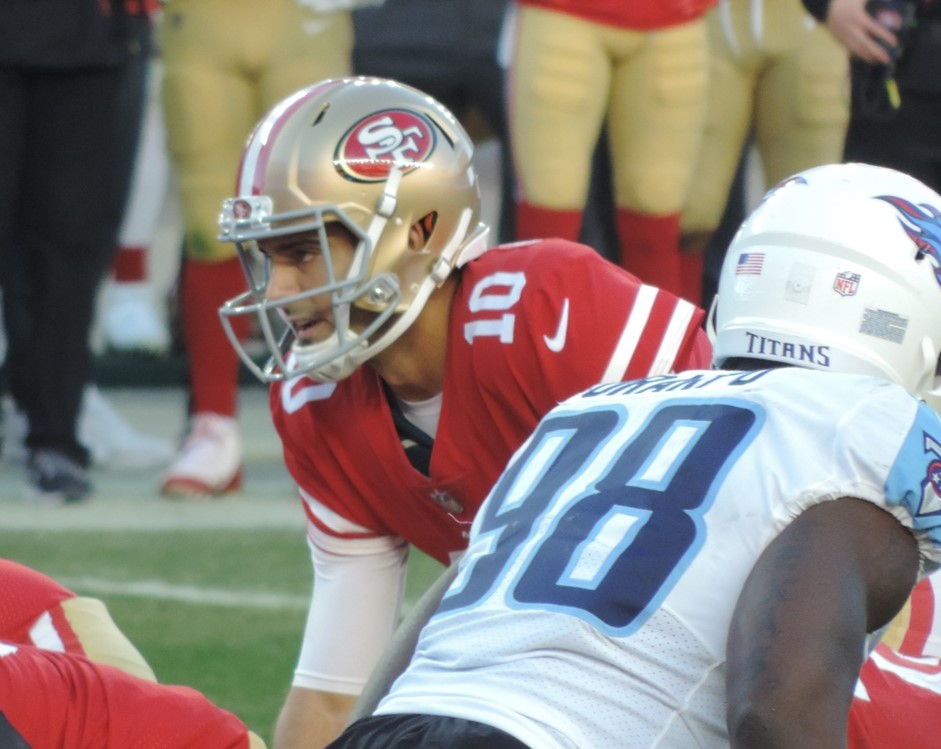
Garoppolo in 2017

On October 31, 2017, the Patriots traded Garoppolo to the San Francisco 49ers in exchange for the 49ers' second-round pick in the 2018 NFL draft.

Garoppolo made his 49ers debut in the final minute of the Week 12 matchup against the Seahawks, taking his first snaps of the season after starter C. J. Beathard suffered a leg and hip injury. On his first play as a 49er, Garoppolo rushed for six yards, and on the final play of the game, he threw a 10-yard touchdown to Louis Murphy. Garoppolo finished the 24–13 loss completing both of his passes for 18 yards and the aforementioned touchdown.

On November 28, 2017, Garoppolo was named the starter for the Week 13 matchup against the Chicago Bears. Making his first start for the 49ers, Garoppolo finished the narrow 15–14 victory with 293 passing yards and an interception. In the next game against the Houston Texans, he threw for 334 yards, a touchdown, and an interception during the 26–16 road victory. The following week against the Tennessee Titans, Garoppolo recorded a season-high 381 passing yards and a touchdown in the narrow 25–23 victory.

During a Week 16 44–33 victory over the Jacksonville Jaguars, Garoppolo had 242 passing yards, two touchdowns, an interception, and his first career rushing touchdown. In the regular season finale against the Los Angeles Rams, who were resting most defensive starters to prepare for the playoffs, Garoppolo threw for 292 yards, two touchdowns, and two interceptions during the 34–13 road victory. His victories in Weeks 13–17 gave him a 7–0 record in his first seven starts (including his two starts for New England), making Garoppolo the first quarterback to do so since Ben Roethlisberger accomplished the same feat in 2004. With Garoppolo under center, the 49ers scored on 62 percent of their offensive drives, 11 percent more than the second-place Patriots. For perspective, NFL teams scored on 35 percent of their drives in 2017, and the 49ers scored on just 29 percent of their 2017 drives without Garoppolo. Garoppolo finished the 2017 season with 1,560 passing yards, seven touchdowns, and five interceptions to go along with 11 rushing yards and a touchdown in six games and five starts.

Because Garoppolo was on the Patriots' roster for eight games before he was traded to the 49ers, an NFC team, he was eligible for payments from the league based on the Patriots' playoff performance; because the Patriots reached Super Bowl LII, Garoppolo earned $107,000. He was ranked 90th on the NFL Top 100 Players of 2018.

==== 2018 season ====
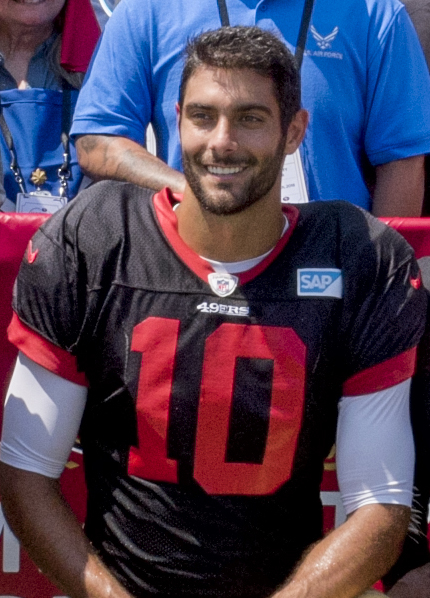
Garoppolo at training camp in 2018

On February 8, 2018, the 49ers and Garoppolo agreed to terms on a five-year contract worth a maximum of $137.5 million. It was the largest contract in NFL history on an annual basis at the time and had nearly $90 million in guarantees in the first three years, also the largest total in NFL history at the time.

During the season-opener against the Minnesota Vikings, Garoppolo struggled, throwing for 261 yards, a touchdown, and three interceptions in the 24–16 road loss. In the next game against the Detroit Lions, he completed 18-of-26 passes for 206 yards and two touchdowns during the 30–27 victory. The following week against the Chiefs, Garoppolo had 251 passing yards and two touchdowns to go along with 23 rushing yards before leaving the eventual 38–27 road loss in the fourth quarter with a left knee injury. It was later revealed that he tore his ACL, prematurely ending his season. With Garoppolo sidelined, the 49ers went on to finish with a 4–12 record.

==== 2019 season ====
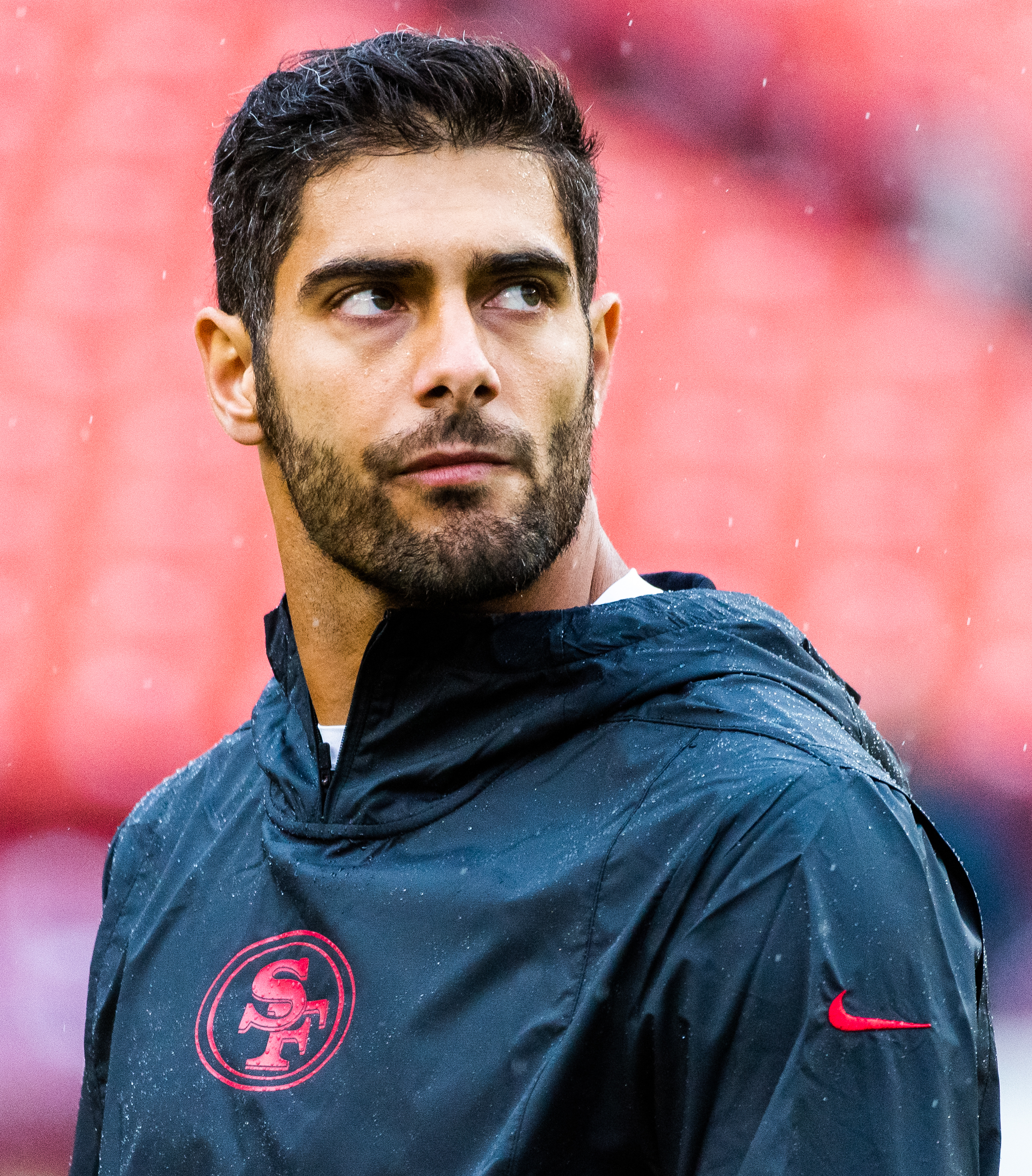
Garoppolo in 2019

Garoppolo returned from his injury in time for the season-opening 31–17 road victory over the Tampa Bay Buccaneers and threw for 166 yards, a touchdown, and an interception. In the next game against the Cincinnati Bengals, Garoppolo had 297 passing yards, three touchdowns, and an interception during the 41–17 road victory. The following week against the Pittsburgh Steelers, he completed 23-of-32 passes for 277 yards, a touchdown, and two interceptions in the 24–20 victory.

Following a Week 4 bye, the 49ers faced the Cleveland Browns on Monday Night Football. Garoppolo finished the 31–3 blowout victory with 181 passing yards and two touchdowns. In the next game against the Rams, he recorded 243 passing yards and an interception to go along with a rushing touchdown during the 20–7 road victory. Two weeks later against the Carolina Panthers, Garoppolo completed 18-of-22 passes for 175 yards, two touchdowns, and an interception in the 51–13 victory.

During Week 9 against the Cardinals on Thursday Night Football, Garoppolo completed 28-of-37 passes for 317 yards and four touchdowns in the 28–25 road victory. In the next game against the Seahawks on Monday Night Football, he threw for 248 yards, a touchdown, and an interception during the 27–24 overtime loss. The following week against the Cardinals, Garoppolo completed 34-of-45 passes for a season-high 424 passing yards, four touchdowns, and two interceptions in the 36–26 victory.

During a Week 12 37–8 victory over the Green Bay Packers on Sunday Night Football, Garoppolo recorded 253 passing yards and two touchdowns. In the next game against the Baltimore Ravens, he threw for 165 yards and a touchdown during the 20–17 road loss. The following week against the New Orleans Saints, Garoppolo completed 26-of-35 passes for 349 yards, four touchdowns, and an interception during the narrow 48–46 road victory, earning him NFC Offensive Player of the Week honors.

During Week 15 against the Falcons, Garoppolo had 200 passing yards and a touchdown in the 29–22 loss. In the next game against the Rams, he recorded 248 passing yards, a touchdown, and two interceptions during the 34–31 victory. During the regular-season finale against the Seahawks, Garoppolo completed 18-of-22 passes for 285 yards during the 26–21 road victory, which clinched the NFC West and home-field advantage throughout the NFC playoffs for the 49ers.

Garoppolo finished the 2019 season with 3,978 passing yards, 27 touchdowns, and 13 interceptions to go along with 62 rushing yards and a touchdown in 16 games and starts. He was the runner-up for NFL Comeback Player of the Year, finishing one vote behind Titans quarterback Ryan Tannehill. In the Divisional Round against the Minnesota Vikings, Garoppolo recorded 131 passing yards, a touchdown, and an interception during the 27–10 victory. Hampered by a knee injury, Garoppolo attempted only eight passes during the NFC Championship Game against the Packers, the fewest in a postseason game since Bob Griese in Super Bowl VIII, completing six for 77 yards in the 37–20 victory. During Super Bowl LIV against the Chiefs, Garoppolo completed 20-of-31 passes for 219 yards, a touchdown, and two interceptions in the 31–20 loss. The 49ers were up by 10 points with seven minutes remaining in the game, but the Chiefs later scored 21 points in five minutes to win. Garoppolo was ranked 43rd by his fellow players on the NFL Top 100 Players of 2020.

==== 2020 season ====
During the season-opening 24–20 loss to the Cardinals, Garoppolo threw for 259 yards and two touchdowns. In the next game against the New York Jets, Garoppolo recorded 131 passing yards and two touchdowns before leaving the eventual 31–13 road victory following the first half with an ankle sprain and was replaced by Nick Mullens. Garoppolo missed the next two games against the New York Giants and Philadelphia Eagles before returning to the starting lineup in Week 5 against the Dolphins. During the 43–17 loss, Garoppolo completed seven of 17 passes for 77 yards and two interceptions before being benched in favor of C. J. Beathard at halftime. After the game, head coach Kyle Shanahan said that he benched Garoppolo because he was concerned Garoppolo was not fully recovered and did not want his injury aggravated. In the next game against the Rams on Sunday Night Football, Garoppolo had 268 passing yards and three touchdowns during the 24–16 victory.

During Week 7 against his former team, the New England Patriots, Garoppolo had 277 passing yards and two interceptions in the 33–6 road victory. In the next game against the Seahawks, Garoppolo completed 11-of-16 passes for only 84 yards and an interception before leaving the eventual 37–27 road loss during the fourth quarter with an ankle injury and being replaced by Mullens. The next day, it was announced that Garoppolo would be out indefinitely due to him re-aggravating his high ankle sprain. On November 5, 2020, Garoppolo was placed on injured reserve. He was designated to return from injured reserve on December 22, and began practicing with the team again, but the 49ers did not activate Garoppolo before the season ended. He finished the 2020 season with 1,096 passing yards, seven touchdowns, and five interceptions in six games and starts.

==== 2021 season ====
Garoppolo was named the starter over third overall pick Trey Lance to begin the 2021 season. During the season-opening 41–33 road victory over the Lions, Garoppolo recorded 314 passing yards and a touchdown. In the next game against the Philadelphia Eagles, he completed 22-of-30 passes for 189 and a touchdown while also rushing for 20 yards and a touchdown during the 17–11 road victory. The following week against the Packers, Garoppolo threw for 254 yards, two touchdowns, and an interception in the narrow 30–28 loss.

During Week 4 against the Seahawks, Garoppolo had 165 passing yards, a touchdown, and an interception before leaving the eventual 28–21 loss during the second half with a calf injury. Due to his injury, Garoppolo missed the next game against the Cardinals. Following a Week 6 bye, Garoppolo returned from injury and threw for 181 yards, a touchdown, and two interceptions in a 30–18 loss to the Indianapolis Colts on Sunday Night Football. In the next game against the Bears, he had 322 passing yards and two rushing touchdowns during the 33–22 road victory. The following week against the Cardinals, Garoppolo completed 28-of-40 passes for 326 yards, two touchdowns, and an interception in the 31–17 loss.

During a Week 10 31–10 victory the Rams on Monday Night Football, Garoppolo completed 15-of-19 passes for 182 yards and two touchdowns. In the next game against the Jaguars, he completed 16-of-22 passes for 176 yards and two touchdowns during the 30–10 road victory. The following week against the Vikings, Garoppolo had 230 passing yards, a touchdown, and an interception in the 34–26 victory.

During Week 13 against the Seahawks, Garoppolo threw for 299 yards, two touchdowns, and an interception in the 30–23 road loss. In the following game against the Cincinnati Bengals, he recorded 296 passing yards and two touchdowns in a 26–23 overtime victory on the road. The following week against the Falcons, Garoppolo completed 18-of-23 passes for 235 yards and a touchdown in the 31–13 victory.

During a Week 16 20–17 road loss to the Titans on Thursday Night Football, Garoppolo completed 26-of-35 passes for 322 yards, a touchdown, and two interceptions. However, he suffered a thumb injury during the game and missed the next game against the Texans as a result. In the regular-season finale against the Rams, Garoppolo returned from injury and completed 23-of-32 passes for 316 yards, a touchdown, and two interceptions as he helped the 49ers rally from being down 17–3 at halftime and won on the road 27–24 in overtime, sending the team to the playoffs.

Garoppolo finished the 2021 season with 3,810 passing yards, 20 touchdowns, and 12 interceptions to go along with 51 rushing yards and three touchdowns in 15 games and starts as the 49ers finished the regular season with a 10–7 record. During the Wild Card Round against the Dallas Cowboys, Garoppolo recorded 172 passing yards and an interception in the 23–17 road victory. In the Divisional Round, he threw for 131 yards and an interception during the 13–10 upset road victory over the heavily favored Packers. During the NFC Championship Game against the Rams, Garoppolo had 232 passing yards and two touchdowns, but threw a costly interception to Travin Howard in the final two minutes in the 20–17 road loss.

==== 2022 season ====
During training camp, former backup quarterback Trey Lance was named the starter over Garoppolo for the 2022 season. Garoppolo and the 49ers agreed to a one-year contract to keep him with the team. As part of the contract, Garoppolo had a fully guaranteed base salary of $6.5 million.

During a Week 2 27–7 victory over the Seahawks, Garoppolo entered the game in the first quarter after Lance suffered an ankle injury and finished with 154 passing yards and a touchdown to go along with a rushing touchdown. After the game, it was revealed Lance's injury was season-ending, making Garoppolo the starter for the rest of the season. In the next game against the Denver Broncos on Sunday Night Football, he had 211 passing yards, a touchdown, and an interception while also stepping out of the back of the end zone, committing a safety during the narrow 11–10 road loss. The following week against the Rams on Monday Night Football, Garoppolo threw for 239 yards and a touchdown in the 24–9 victory.

During Week 5 against the Panthers, Garoppolo threw for 253 yards and two touchdowns in the 37–15 road victory. In the next game against the Falcons, he completed 29-of-41 passes for 296 yards, two touchdowns, and two interceptions during the 28–14 road loss. The following week against the Chiefs, Garoppolo had 303 passing yards, two touchdowns, and an interception in the 44–23 loss.

During a Week 8 31–14 road victory over the Rams, Garoppolo completed 21-of-25 passes for 235 yards and two touchdowns. Following a Week 9 bye, the 49ers returned home to face the Los Angeles Chargers on Sunday Night Football. Garoppolo finished the 22–16 victory with 240 passing yards and a rushing touchdown. In the next game against the Cardinals at Estadio Azteca on Monday Night Football, he threw for 228 yards and four touchdowns during the 38–10 victory. The following week against the Saints, Garoppolo completed 26-of-37 passes for 222 yards and a touchdown in the 13–0 shutout victory.

During Week 13 against the Dolphins, Garoppolo threw for 56 yards before leaving the eventual 33–17 victory with a foot injury in the first quarter. He was initially expected to undergo surgery, prematurely ending his season. However, it was later reported by ESPN that Garoppolo did not suffer a Lisfranc foot injury and had a return timetable of 7–8 weeks. Ultimately, he did not return for the rest of the season. Without Garoppolo, the 49ers finished the season atop the NFC West with a 13–4 record but lost to the Eagles in the NFC Championship Game on the road 31–7 after injuries to both Brock Purdy and Josh Johnson.

Garoppolo finished the 2022 season with 2,437 passing yards, 16 touchdowns, and four interceptions to go along with 33 rushing yards and two touchdowns in 11 games and 10 starts.

=== Las Vegas Raiders ===
On March 17, 2023, Garoppolo signed a three-year, $67.5 million contract with the Las Vegas Raiders. The signing reunited him with Raiders head coach Josh McDaniels, who was the offensive coordinator when Garoppolo was with the Patriots.

Garoppolo made his Raiders debut during the narrow season-opening 17–16 road victory over the Broncos, completing 20-of-26 passes for 200 yards, two touchdowns, and an interception. In the next game against the Buffalo Bills, Garoppolo threw for 185 yards, a touchdown, and two interceptions during the 38–10 road loss. The following week against the Steelers on Sunday Night Football, he had 324 passing yards, two touchdowns, and three interceptions in the 23–18 loss.

Garoppolo did not play in Week 4 against the Chargers due to a concussion. He returned the following week against the Packers on Monday Night Football and finished the 17–13 victory completing 22-of-31 passes for 208 yards, a touchdown, and an interception. In the next game against his former team, the Patriots, Garoppolo recorded 162 passing yards, a touchdown, and an interception before leaving the eventual 21–17 victory at halftime with a back injury. He missed the following week against the Bears due to his injury.

During Week 8 against the Lions on Monday Night Football, Garoppolo returned from his injury, but struggled as he completed 10-of-21 passes for 126 yards and an interception in the 26–14 loss. The next day, Garoppolo was benched in favor of rookie Aidan O'Connell after leading the NFL in interceptions and missing two games for a subpar 3–5 start to the year. The move came on the same day as the firing of Josh McDaniels.

Garoppolo finished the 2023 season with 1,205 passing yards, seven touchdowns, and nine interceptions to go along with 39 rushing yards in seven games and six starts. He was released on March 13, 2024.

=== Los Angeles Rams ===
==== 2024 season ====
Garoppolo signed with the Los Angeles Rams on a one-year deal on March 19, 2024. He was suspended the first two games of the season for violating the league's performance-enhancing drug policy. Garoppolo did not play during the preseason and spent the remainder of the season as the backup to Matthew Stafford after completion of his suspension.

While Garoppolo was active from Week 3 onward, he did not make his Rams debut until the regular season finale against the Seahawks when the Rams opted to rest Stafford and most other starters with their playoff berth secured. Garoppolo completed 27-of-41 passes for 334 yards, two touchdowns, and an interception in the 30–25 loss.

==== 2025 season ====
On March 10, 2025, Garoppolo re-signed with the Rams on a one-year deal. He appeared in three games during the regular season, conducting kneel downs in victory formation and did not make a pass attempt.

== Career statistics ==
Legend
	Won the Super Bowl
**Bold**	Career high

=== NFL ===
==== Regular season ====
Year	Team	Games			Passing									Rushing					Sacks		Fumbles	
Year	Team	GP	GS	Record	Cmp	Att	Pct	Yds	Y/A	Lng	TD	Int	Rtg	Att	Yds	Avg	Lng	TD	Sck	Yds	Fum	Lost
2014	NE	6	0	—	19	27	**70.4**	182	6.7	37	1	0	101.2	10	9	0.9	9	0	5	36	0	0
2015	NE	5	0	—	1	4	25.0	6	1.5	6	0	0	39.6	5	−5	−1.0	−1	0	0	0	0	0
2016	NE	6	2	**2–0**	43	63	68.3	502	8.0	37	4	0	**113.3**	10	6	0.6	10	0	3	15	2	1
2017	NE	0	0	—	DNP																	
2017	SF	6	5	**5–0**	120	178	67.4	1,560	**8.8**	61	7	5	96.2	15	11	0.7	8	1	8	57	1	0
2018	SF	3	3	1–2	53	89	59.6	718	8.1	56	5	3	90.0	8	33	**4.1**	**13**	0	13	97	4	0
2019	SF	16	16	13–3	**329**	**476**	69.1	**3,978**	8.4	75	**27**	**13**	102.0	**46**	**62**	1.3	11	1	**36**	**237**	**10**	**5**
2020	SF	6	6	3–3	94	140	67.1	1,096	7.8	76	7	5	92.4	10	25	2.5	9	0	11	77	2	0
2021	SF	15	15	9–6	301	441	68.3	3,810	8.6	**83**	20	12	98.7	38	51	1.3	7	**3**	29	201	8	3
2022	SF	11	10	7–3	207	308	67.2	2,437	7.9	57	16	4	103.0	23	33	1.4	6	2	18	100	3	2
2023	LV	7	6	3–3	110	169	65.1	1,205	7.1	32	7	9	77.7	20	39	2.0	9	0	14	101	1	0
2024	LAR	1	1	0–1	27	41	65.9	334	8.1	50	2	1	97.0	2	5	2.5	5	0	3	15	0	0
2025	LAR	3	0	—	0	0	0.0	0	—	0	0	0	0.0	9	–10	–1.1	–1	0	0	0	0	0
Career		85	64	43–21	1,304	1,936	67.4	15,828	8.2	83	96	52	97.6	196	259	1.3	13	7	140	936	31	11

==== Postseason ====
Year	Team	Games			Passing									Rushing					Sacks		Fumbles	
Year	Team	GP	GS	Record	Cmp	Att	Pct	Yds	Y/A	Lng	TD	Int	Rtg	Att	Yds	Avg	Lng	TD	Sck	Yds	Fum	Lost
2014	NE	1	0	—	0	0	—	0	—	0	0	0	—	0	0	—	0	0	0	0	0	0
2015	NE	0	0	—	DNP																	
2016	NE	0	0	—	DNP																	
2019	SF	3	3	**2–1**	37	58	**63.8**	427	**7.4**	30	**2**	**3**	**75.9**	**10**	1	0.1	3	0	**4**	**26**	0	0
2021	SF	3	3	**2–1**	**43**	**74**	58.1	**535**	7.2	**44**	**2**	**3**	72.7	2	**5**	**2.5**	**4**	0	**4**	25	0	0
2022	SF	0	0	—	Did not play due to injury																	
2024	LAR	0	0	—	DNP																	
Career		7	6	4–2	80	132	60.6	962	7.3	44	4	6	74.1	12	6	0.5	4	0	8	51	0	0

=== College ===
Season	Team	Games			Passing								Rushing			
Season	Team	GP	GS	Record	Cmp	Att	Pct	Yds	Y/A	TD	Int	Rtg	Att	Yds	Avg	TD
2010	Eastern Illinois	8	8	2–6	124	211	58.8	1,639	7.8	14	13	133.6	41	-138	-3.4	1
2011	Eastern Illinois	11	11	2–9	217	349	62.2	2,644	7.6	20	14	136.7	66	-61	-0.9	1
2012	Eastern Illinois	12	12	7–5	331	540	61.3	3,823	7.1	31	**15**	134.2	**83**	0	0.0	2
2013	Eastern Illinois	14	14	**12–2**	**375**	**568**	**66.0**	**5,050**	**8.9**	**53**	9	**168.3**	70	**62**	**0.9**	**4**
Career		45	45	23–22	1,047	1,668	62.8	13,156	7.9	118	51	146.3	260	-137	-0.5	8
