= Jeremy Moses =

American football player and coach (born 1988)

Current position
- Title: Running backs coach
- Team: Colorado State Rams
- Conference: Mountain West

Biographical details
- Born: September 4, 1988 (age 38); Baytown, Texas, U.S.
- Education: Stephen F. Austin State University

Playing career
- 2007–2010: Stephen F. Austin
- Position: Quarterback

Coaching career (HC unless noted)
- 2011: North Alabama (assistant)
- 2012–2013: Stephen F. Austin (QB)
- 2014–2016: Stephen F. Austin (RB)
- 2017–2018: Stephen F. Austin (Co-OC/WR)
- 2019–??: Clear Lake HS (TX) (OC/QBs)
- ??-2021: Baytown Sterling HS (TX) (OC/QBs)
- 2022–present: Colorado State (RB)

Jeremy Moses (born September 4, 1988) is an American former college football quarterback who played for the Stephen F. Austin Lumberjacks. In his Stephen F. Austin career, Moses passed for 13,401 yards and 121 touchdowns; his 1,184 completions are an FCS record. He is currently the running backs coach at Colorado State.

== Playing career ==
Moses started at quarterback for Stephen F. Austin from 2007 to 2010. Moses helped Stephen F. Austin to back-to-back conference titles in 2009 and 2010 after an 0–11 2007 season. Moses was a two-time Southland Conference Player of the Year. In 2010, he led the FCS in pass attempts, completions, touchdown passes and passing yards; he won the Walter Payton Award, becoming the first Southland Conference player to win the award.

== Coaching career ==
Moses spent the 2011 season as an assistant at North Alabama. In January 2012, he returned to Stephen F. Austin as an assistant. While at Stephen F. Austin, Moses coached quarterbacks, running backs, before finally moving to wide receivers and being promoted to co-offensive coordinator. After the staff at SFA was let go, Moses returned to the Houston area and coach at Clear Lake High School and then Sterling High School.

In February 2022, Moses was hired to be the running backs coach on Jay Norvell's new staff at Colorado State.
