= Dominic Randolph =

American football player (born 1986)

No. 8
- Position: Quarterback

Personal information
- Born: November 11, 1986 (age 39); Amelia, Ohio, U.S.
- Listed height: 6 ft 3 in (1.91 m)
- Listed weight: 223 lb (101 kg)

Career information
- High school: St. Xavier (Cincinnati, Ohio)
- College: Holy Cross
- NFL draft: 2010: undrafted

Career history
- New York Giants (2010)*; Chicago Rush (2011)
- * Offseason or practice squad member only

Awards and highlights
- 3× Patriot League Offensive Player of the Year (2007, 2008, 2009); New England Football Writer's Gold Helment Award (2008)

Career AFL statistics
- Completion %: 66.2%
- Passing yards: 557
- TD–INT: 13–5
- Passer rating: 100.18
- Rushing TDs: 1
- Stats at ArenaFan.com

Dominic Randolph (born November 11, 1986) is an American former professional football quarterback. He played college football at the College of the Holy Cross, and high school football at St. Xavier High School in Cincinnati. He was a member of the New York Giants and Chicago Rush.

== Early life ==
Randolph was born in Amelia, Ohio to Charles and Rose Randolph. His father, Charles, played college football at the University of Michigan.

Randolph only started two games at varsity level at St. Xavier High School in Cincinnati due to his campaign being overshadowed by Robby Schoenhoft, who was an Elite 11 quarterback and went on to play at Ohio State University. Randolph threw for 2,450 yards and 17 touchdowns during his high school career at freshmen and junior varsity levels and led the team to the Greater Cincinnati League title in his senior season. He was also a member of the St. Xavier basketball team. Randolph graduated in 2005.

== College career ==
=== 2006 ===
After missing the 2005 season due to an injury, Randolph played in nine games in 2006. He completed 184 of 299 passes for 2,237 yards and 19 touchdowns with just six interceptions. He also led the Patriot League in total offense and passing yards, while placing second in pass efficiency rating (141.3). Randolph was ranked eighth in the nation in passing yards, ninth in completions, tenth in total offense and 20th in passing efficiency.

=== 2007 ===
In 2007 Randolph was named captain of the Crusaders's football team to go along with a stellar year. He was named Offensive Player of the Year in the Patriot League and placed 12th in the voting for the 2007 Walter Payton Award. Randolph completed 297 of 482 passes on the season for the Crusaders for a total of 3,604 yards and 30 touchdowns with just eight interceptions.

=== 2008 ===
In 2008 Randolph was named Offensive Player of the Year for the second straight year in the Patriot League and placed ninth in the voting for the 2008 Walter Payton Award. He was a first-team All-Patriot League selection, received the Gold Helmet from the New England Football Writers and earned honorable mention All-America honors from The Sports Network. That year Holy Cross finished second in the Patriot League, their best finish since 1991.

== Professional career ==
=== New York Giants ===
On April 24, 2010, Randolph signed as an undrafted free agent with the New York Giants. He was waived by the Giants on May 7 and re-signed on August 18. He was waived again on September 4, 2010.

=== Chicago Rush ===
Randolph began the 2011 season with the Chicago Rush in the Arena Football League. He started the year as Chicago's second-string quarterback behind Russ Michna. An injury to Michna opened the door for Randolph to start his first AFL game, June 26, 2011 against the Iowa Barnstormers. He was 17-for-27 for 189 yards, four touchdowns, and one interceptions in a 58-48 win.
