= Eric Barriere =

American football player (born 1997)

No. 3
- Position: Quarterback

Personal information
- Born: December 27, 1997 (age 28); Inglewood, California, U.S.
- Listed height: 6 ft 1 in (1.85 m)
- Listed weight: 210 lb (95 kg)

Career information
- High school: La Habra (La Habra, California)
- College: Eastern Washington (2016–2021)
- NFL draft: 2022: undrafted

Career history
- Michigan Panthers (2022–2023); New Jersey Generals (2023); Winnipeg Blue Bombers (2024)*; Saskatchewan Roughriders (2024)
- * Offseason or practice squad member only

Awards and highlights
- Walter Payton Award (2021); 2× Big Sky Offensive Player of the Year (2020, 2021); 2× First-team All-Big Sky (2020, 2021); 2× Third-team All-Big Sky (2018, 2019)

Eric Barriere (born December 27, 1997) is an American former professional football quarterback. He played college football for Eastern Washington University. Barriere won the Walter Payton Award for the 2021 FCS season, an award given to the top offensive player in the NCAA Division I Football Championship Subdivision.

== Early life ==
Barriere grew up in Inglewood, California, and attended La Habra High School in La Habra, California. He finished his high school career with 7,586 passing yards and 104 touchdowns and also rushed for 1,718 yards and 26 touchdowns.

== College career ==
Barriere redshirted his true freshman season. He became the Eagles starting quarterback six games into his redshirt sophomore season and led the team to an 8–2 record while passing for 2,450 yards and 24 touchdowns and also rushing for 606 yards and eight touchdowns. In his first full season as a starter, Barriere completed 258 of 438 pass attempts for 3,712 yards and 31 touchdowns against four interceptions while also rushing for 558 yards and eight touchdowns. As a redshirt junior, he completed 183 of 296 passes for 2,439 yards, 19 touchdowns and seven interceptions in seven games during spring 2021 season, which was delayed from the fall due to the COVID-19 pandemic. Barriere was a finalist for the Walter Payton Award and finished second in voting behind winner Cole Kelley. As a redshirt senior, Barriere won the Walter Payton award after passing for 5,070 yards and 46 touchdowns.

== Professional career ==
Barriere went unselected in the 2022 NFL draft. He participated in the rookie minicamp with the Denver Broncos on a tryout basis, but was not offered a contract.

=== Michigan Panthers ===
On May 20, 2022, Barriere signed with the Michigan Panthers of the United States Football League (USFL) and was subsequently transferred to the team's inactive roster. On June 10, Barriere was transferred to the active roster. He waived in May 2023.

=== New Jersey Generals ===
Barriere was claimed off waivers by the New Jersey Generals on May 30, 2023. He re-signed with the Generals on September 14. The Generals folded when the XFL and USFL merged to create the United Football League (UFL).

=== Winnipeg Blue Bombers ===
Barriere signed with the Winnipeg Blue Bombers of the Canadian Football League (CFL) on January 18, 2024 and was released May 25.

=== Saskatchewan Roughriders ===
Barriere was signed by the Saskatchewan Roughriders of the CFL on June 30, 2024. He was moved to the practice roster on August 15 and released on August 19.

== Professional career statistics ==
Year	Team	League	Games			Passing								Rushing			
Year	Team	League	GP	GS	Record	Cmp	Att	Pct	Yds	Y/A	TD	Int	Rtg	Att	Yds	Avg	TD
2022	MICH	USFL	2	0	0-0	14	24	58.3	118	4.9	1	1	67.7	2	13	6.5	0
