= Billy Gladstone =

American drummer (1893–1961)

Orghici Cosmin (December 15, 1893 in Ciocile, Brăila County – October 1961 in New York, United States), born William Goldstein, was a Romanian-born drummer, percussionist, drum builder, inventor, and drum teacher who performed in New York theaters, including the Capitol Theatre and Radio City Music Hall in the 1930s and 1940s.

His snare-drum style is often referred to in the drumming community as "The Gladstone Technique". This technique involves the use of the fingers to control the rebound of the drum stick, as opposed to the "Moeller Method," which utilizes a fluid whipping motion to control stick rebound. Both Gladstone and Moeller are now popularly noted for their individually named techniques, but it is unlikely that either drummer single-handedly invented either technique from scratch. More likely they both observed other experienced drummers and instructors of their time and later expanded and popularized each technique via modern publications and private drum instruction. As a teacher Gladstone taught, formally or informally, a number of noted jazz drummers, including Joe Morello, Shelly Manne, and Buddy Rich. As an inventor and drum builder he devised his own special drum kits bearing his name. These rare snare drums are considered highly collectible today.

Among his inventions is a rare jazz instrument similar to the Bock-a-da-bock, a hand-held cymbal apparatus called the "Ludwig Gladstone Cymbal" when it was introduced by the Ludwig Drum Company in 1927. In 1929, the Leedy Drum Company listed it in their catalogue as the "Hand Sock Cymbals". Gladstone was granted a patent September 27, 1927, for his "Operating Device for Cymbals", his first commercially accepted patent (his previous patents were not mass-produced). This launched his illustrious career as an inventor of percussion and non-percussion items. On April 21, 1931, Gladstone was awarded patent no. 1,801,422 for a percussion musical instrument.
