= Ciocile =

- Commune
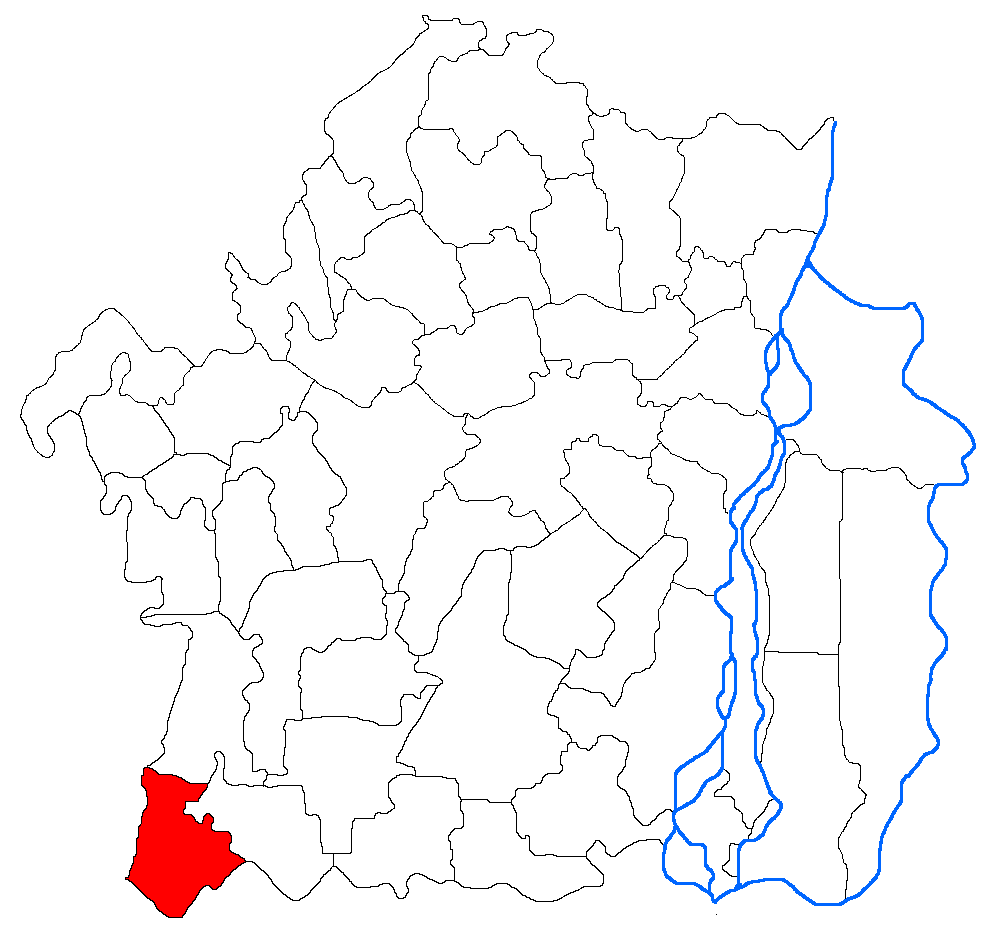
- Location in Brăila County

- Location in Romania
- Coordinates: 44°49′N 27°14′E
- Country: Romania
- County: Brăila
- Population (2021-12-01): 2,192
- Time zone: EET/EEST (UTC+2/+3)
- Vehicle reg.: BR

Ciocile is a commune located in Brăila County, Muntenia, Romania. It is composed of four villages: Chichinețu, Chioibășești, Ciocile and Odăieni.

Chichinețu village was renamed Ștefan Gheorghiu by Romania's communist authorities; its previous name was restored in 1996.

== Natives ==
- Florea Fătu
- Billy Gladstone
