= Shawn Knight (quarterback) =

American gridiron football player (born 1972)

Profile
- Position: Quarterback

Personal information
- Born: January 19, 1972 (age 54); Norfolk, Virginia, U.S.
- Listed height: 5 ft 10 in (1.78 m)
- Listed weight: 175 lb (79 kg)

Career information
- High school: Maury High School (Norfolk, Virginia)
- College: William & Mary

Career history
- 1995–1996: Toronto Argonauts

Awards and highlights
- 2× All-Yankee Conference (1993, 1994)

Career statistics
- Comp-Att: 2–4
- Yards: 18
- TD–INT: 0–0
- Rushing attempts: 2
- Rushing yards: 10

Shawn Knight (born January 19, 1972) is an American former professional gridiron football quarterback who played in the Canadian Football League (CFL). Knight played college football and college baseball at William & Mary.

== Early life ==
Knight was born and grew up in Norfolk, Virginia and attended Matthew Fontaine Maury High School. He committed to play at William & Mary, where coach Jimmye Laycock offered him opportunity to play quarterback, over scholarship offers from James Madison, North Carolina, and Virginia.

== College career ==
Knight redshirted his freshman year at William & Mary and spent the next two seasons as the backup to future NFL quarterback Chris Hakel. He set an NCAA record for passing efficiency and was named second team All-Yankee Conference in his redshirt junior after completing 69.4 percent of his passes for 2,235 yards and 22 touchdowns. As a senior, Knight completed 125 of 177 passes for 2,055 yards, 22 touchdowns and four interceptions and was again named second team All-Yankee Conference. Knight finished his collegiate career with 5,705 passing yards, 46 touchdown passes and 6,408 yards of total offense. While at William & Mary, he was teammates with future NFL head coaches Sean McDermott and Mike Tomlin, who was also his roommate.

Knight also played baseball as a junior and senior. As a junior, he batted .316 and stole 38 bases in 45 attempts despite not having played since his senior year in high school. Knight was selected in the 75th round of the 1993 Major League Baseball draft, but opted not to sign with the team and return to William & Mary. He hit for a .295 average as a senior.

== Professional career ==
Due to his size, Knight was not considered an NFL prospect. He was heavily scouted by Canadian Football League league teams and signed with the Toronto Argonauts of the on April 11, 1995. He played in five games during the 1995 season, seeing limited action. Knight was released by Toronto during the 1996 season.

Knight also played professional baseball in the San Diego Padres organization after being selected in the 13th round of the 1994 Major League Baseball draft. He spent one season with the Padres' Class A affiliate, the Spokane Indians, in between his redshirt junior and senior years and batted .280.

== Post-football career ==
After retiring from football, Knight initially worked in the legislative affairs division of a law firm in Richmond, Virginia. He later became the athletics director at Huguenot High School before becoming an administrator for the Virginia High School League.
