= Willie Totten =

American football player and coach (born 1962)

Current position
- Title: Associate head coach & offensive coordinator
- Team: Fort Valley State
- Conference: SIAC

Biographical details
- Born: July 4, 1962 (age 64); Leflore County, Mississippi, U.S.

Playing career
- 1981–1985: Mississippi Valley State
- 1986: BC Lions
- 1987: Toronto Argonauts
- 1987: Buffalo Bills
- 1988: Chicago Bruisers
- 1989: Pittsburgh Gladiators
- 1991: New Orleans Night
- Position: Quarterback

Coaching career (HC unless noted)
- 1988: Grambling State (GA)
- 1990–1997: Mississippi Valley State (assistant)
- 1998–1999: Eastside HS (MS)
- 2000–2001: Mississippi Valley State (OC)
- 2002–2009: Mississippi Valley State
- 2013: Albany State (QB)
- 2014–2018: Alabama A&M (QB)
- 2019–2022: Mississippi Valley State (AHC/QB)
- 2023–2024: Southern (QB)
- 2025–present: Fort Valley State (AHC/OC)

Head coaching record
- Overall: 31–57 (college)

Accomplishments and honors

Awards
- First-team All-Arena (1989); MVSU Athletics Hall of Fame (2006)
- College Football Hall of Fame; Inducted in 2005 (profile)

Willie "Satellite" Totten (born July 4, 1962) is an American college football coach and former college quarterback who played with Jerry Rice in Mississippi. He is the associate head football coach and offensive coordinator for Fort Valley State University, positions he has held since 2025. Totten played college football for the Mississippi Valley State Delta Devils as a quarterback. Teamed with wide receiver Jerry Rice, Totten set more than 50 NCAA Division I-AA passing records with Rice setting many receiving records. The Delta Devils averaged 59 points a game during the 1984 season as Totten threw for a record 58 touchdowns and led them to the NCAA Division I-AA playoffs. Archie Cooley, who was the head coach at MVSU from 1980 to 1986, was the architect of the pass-oriented offense that utilized the skills of Totten.

Totten served as the head football coach at Mississippi Valley State from 2002 to 2009.

== Early life and college career ==
Totten played his high school football at J. Z. George High School in North Carrollton, Mississippi.

== Professional playing career ==
Totten played professionally in the Canadian Football League (CFL) with the BC Lions and Toronto Argonauts before moving on to the National Football League (NFL), as a replacement player for the Buffalo Bills during the strike-shortened 1987 NFL season. Totten played in two games, starting one. He completed 13 of 33 passes for 155 yards, two touchdowns and two interceptions during his stint in the NFL.

Totten played in the Arena Football League (AFL) for the Chicago Bruisers, Pittsburgh Gladiators, and the New Orleans Night each for a single season. During his season with Chicago, the Bruisers reached Arena Bowl II, but were defeated by the Detroit Drive. His best season came next year in 1989 with the Gladiators when he passed for 13 touchdowns and six interceptions over the short four game season. He finished his arena football career with 1665 passing yards, 23 passing touchdowns, 13 interceptions, and 3 additional rushing touchdowns.

== Coaching career ==
Totten earned his master's degree at Grambling State University, and was a graduate assistant on the coaching staff for head football coach Eddie Robinson. Totten returned to his alma mater and served as quarterbacks coach and running back coach during the 1990s before moving on to coach at the high school level for two years. He returned to the MVSU coaching staff in 2000, and was elevated to head coach in 2001. Totten brought pride back to Mississippi Valley State, as he led the Delta Devils to back-to-back winning seasons in 2005 and 2006. Totten resigned after the 2009 season, and took an administrative position at MVSU in 2010. In 2013, Totten became quarterbacks coach at Albany State University in Albany, Georgia for one season before accepting the quarterback coaching position at Alabama A&M University under new head football coach James Spady. In 2019 Totten returned to MVSU as an assistant head coach and quarterbacks coach. In 2023, he was hired as the quarterbacks coach at Southern University. He became associate head coach and offensive coordinator at Fort Valley State University in 2025.

== Honors and memberships ==
Totten is one of a few college football coaches ever to coach in a stadium named after him. The Delta Devils football team plays in Rice–Totten Stadium, named for Totten and wide receiver Jerry Rice. He is a member of the College Football Hall of Fame. Totten is a member of Phi Beta Sigma fraternity.

== Head coaching record ==
=== College ===
Year	Team	Overall	Conference	Standing	Bowl/playoffs
Mississippi Valley State Delta Devils (Southwestern Athletic Conference) (2002–2009)
2002	Mississippi Valley State	5–6	3–4	T–3rd (East)	
2003	Mississippi Valley State	2–9	1–6	5th (East)	
2004	Mississippi Valley State	3–8	1–5	5th (East)	
2005	Mississippi Valley State	6–5	5–4	T–3rd (East)	
2006	Mississippi Valley State	6–5	5–4	T–2nd (East)	
2007	Mississippi Valley State	3–8	2–7	T–4th (East)	
2008	Mississippi Valley State	3–8	1–6	T–4th (East)	
2009	Mississippi Valley State	3–8	1–6	T–4th (East)	
Mississippi Valley State:		31–57	19–42		
Total:		31–57			
