= Walter Payton Award =

College football award for most outstanding offensive player

- Walter Payton Award
- Awarded for: "Most outstanding offensive player in the Division I Football Championship Subdivision"
- Country: United States
- Presented by: Stats Perform

History
- First award: 1987, 39 years ago
- Most recent: Youngstown State quarterback Beau Brungard
- Website: www.fcs.football

The Walter Payton Award is awarded annually to the most outstanding offensive player in the NCAA Division I Football Championship Subdivision (formerly Division I-AA) of college football as chosen by a nationwide panel of media and college sports information directors. The honor was first given 39 years ago in 1987 to the outstanding player in the division, but in 1995, eligibility was restricted to offensive players, as the Buck Buchanan Award for defensive players was inaugurated.

The award was named in honor of National Football League (NFL) legend Walter Payton, who starred at Jackson State University in the early 1970s.

Up until presentations for the 2014 season, the Payton and Buchanan Awards were awarded by The Sports Network. Since STATS LLC, now known as Stats Perform, acquired The Sports Network in February 2015, it has presented all of the major FCS awards.

The most recent winner of the award is Beau Brungard, a quarterback from Youngstown State who earned the honor during the 2025 season.

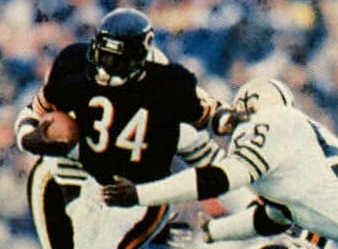
The award was named to honor college and NFL star Walter Payton

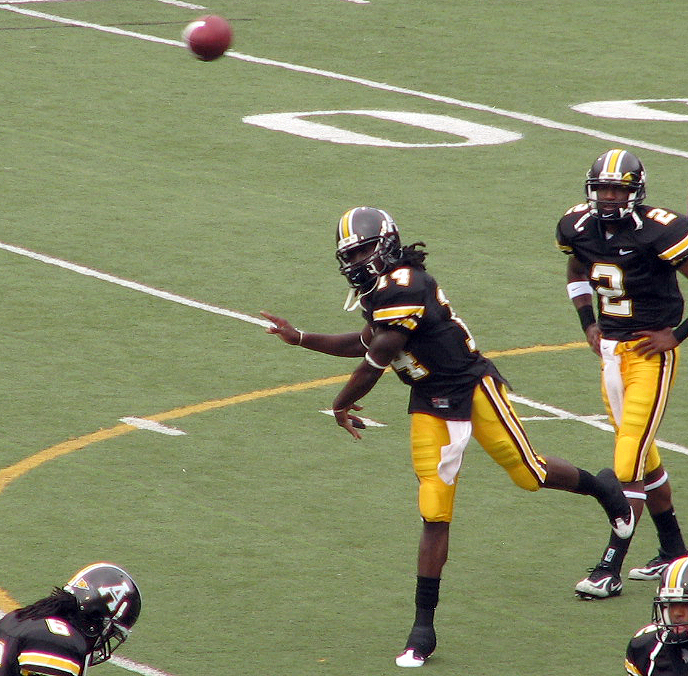
Armanti Edwards was the first player to win the award more than once (2008, 2009).

== Winners ==
Year	Winner	Position	School	Ref.
1987	Kenny Gamble	RB	Colgate	
1988	Dave Meggett	RB	Towson State	
1989	John Friesz	QB	Idaho	
1990	Walter Dean	RB	Grambling State	
1991	Jamie Martin	QB	Weber State	
1992	Michael Payton	QB	Marshall	
1993	Doug Nussmeier	QB	Idaho	
1994	Steve McNair	QB	Alcorn State	
1995	Dave Dickenson	QB	Montana	
1996	Archie Amerson	RB	Northern Arizona	
1997	Brian Finneran	WR	Villanova	
1998	Jerry Azumah	RB	New Hampshire	
1999	Adrian Peterson	RB	Georgia Southern	
2000	Louis Ivory	RB	Furman	
2001	Brian Westbrook	RB	Villanova	
2002	Tony Romo	QB	Eastern Illinois	
2003	Jamaal Branch	RB	Colgate	
2004	Lang Campbell	QB	William & Mary	
2005	Erik Meyer	QB	Eastern Washington	
2006	Ricky Santos	QB	New Hampshire	
2007	Jayson Foster	QB	Georgia Southern	
2008	Armanti Edwards	QB	Appalachian State	
2009	Armanti Edwards (2)	QB	Appalachian State	
2010	Jeremy Moses	QB	Stephen F. Austin	
2011	Bo Levi Mitchell	QB	Eastern Washington	
2012	Taylor Heinicke	QB	Old Dominion	
2013	Jimmy Garoppolo	QB	Eastern Illinois	
2014	John Robertson	QB	Villanova	
2015	Cooper Kupp	WR	Eastern Washington	
2016	Jeremiah Briscoe	QB	Sam Houston State	
2017	Jeremiah Briscoe (2)	QB	Sam Houston State	
2018	Devlin Hodges	QB	Samford	
2019	Trey Lance	QB	North Dakota State	
2020	Cole Kelley	QB	Southeastern Louisiana	
2021	Eric Barriere	QB	Eastern Washington	
2022	Lindsey Scott Jr.	QB	Incarnate Word	
2023	Mark Gronowski	QB	South Dakota State	
2024	Tommy Mellott	QB	Montana State	
2025	Beau Brungard	QB	Youngstown State	

== Awards won by school ==
This is a list of the colleges and universities who have had a player win a Walter Payton Award. Among the many schools in the division, only nine have claimed more than one award, and only seven have had more than one player win the award. Eastern Washington has had four players win the award, Villanova has had three players win the award, and five have had two players win: Colgate, Georgia Southern, Idaho, New Hampshire, and Eastern Illinois. Two players have won the award twice, with both being the only players from their institutions to win. In 2009, Armanti Edwards from Appalachian State became the first to receive the award twice, followed in 2017 by Jeremiah Briscoe from Sam Houston State. (Note: Sam Houston dropped the word "State" from its athletic branding in 2020.) In 2019, Trey Lance of North Dakota State was the first freshman to receive the award.

School	Awards
Eastern Washington	4
Villanova	3
Appalachian State^	2
Colgate	2
Eastern Illinois	2
Georgia Southern^	2
Idaho	2
New Hampshire	2
Sam Houston^	2
Alcorn State	1
Furman	1
Grambling	1
Incarnate Word	1
Marshall^	1
Montana	1
Montana State	1
North Dakota State	1
Northern Arizona	1
North Dakota State^	1
Old Dominion^	1
Samford	1
South Dakota State	1
Southeastern Louisiana	1
Stephen F. Austin	1
Towson	1
Weber State	1
William & Mary	1
Youngstown State	1

^ Team is now a member of the Football Bowl Subdivision (FBS).
