= 2014 Murray State Racers football team =

American college football season

2014 Murray State Racers football
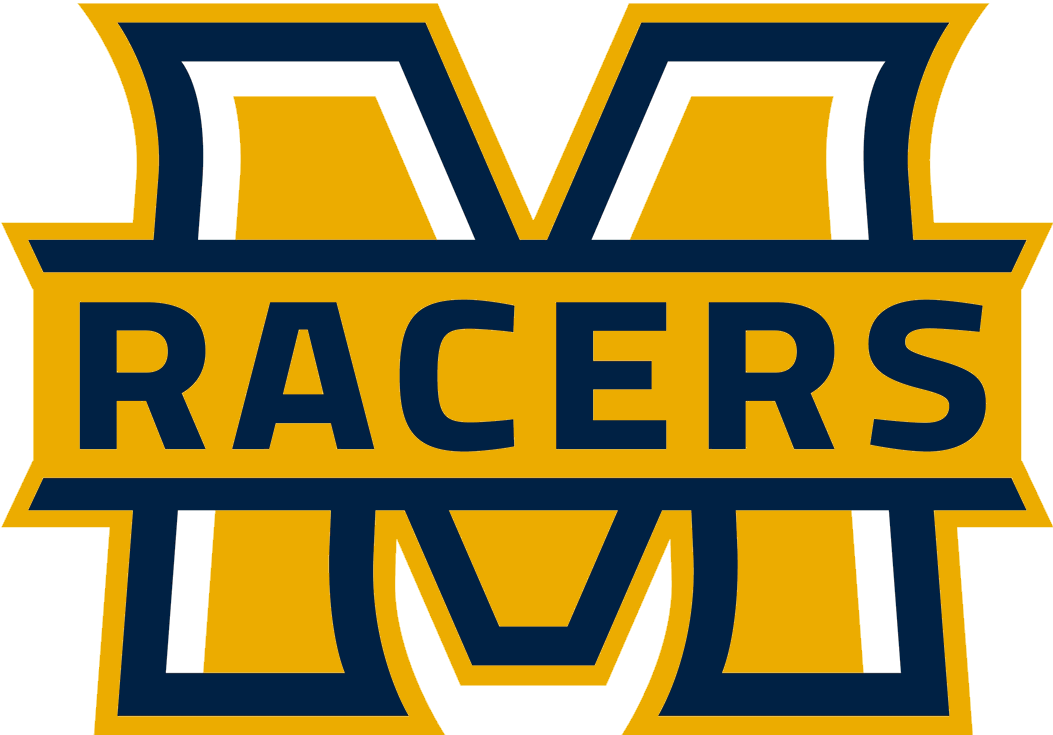
- Conference: Ohio Valley Conference
- Record: 3–9 (1–7 OVC)
- Head coach: Chris Hatcher (5th season)
- Offensive coordinator: Mitch Stewart (4th season)
- Offensive scheme: Air raid
- Defensive coordinator: Dennis Therrell (4th season)
- Base defense: 4–3
- Home stadium: Roy Stewart Stadium

2014 Ohio Valley Conference football standings
	Conf.			Overall
Team	W		L	W		L
No. 9 Jacksonville State $^	8	–	0	10	–	2
No. 21 Eastern Kentucky ^	6	–	2	9	–	4
UT Martin	5	–	3	6	–	6
Eastern Illinois	5	–	3	5	–	7
Tennessee Tech	4	–	4	5	–	7
Tennessee State	3	–	5	6	–	6
SE Missouri State	3	–	5	5	–	7
Murray State	1	–	7	3	–	9
Austin Peay	1	–	7	1	–	11
$ – Conference champion; ^ – FCS playoff participant; Rankings from The Sports Network poll

The 2014 Murray State Racers football team represented Murray State University in the 2014 NCAA Division I FCS football season. They were led by fifth-year head coach Chris Hatcher and played their home games at Roy Stewart Stadium. They were a member of the Ohio Valley Conference. They finished the season 3–9, 1–7 in OVC play to finish in a tie for eighth place.

On December 11, head coach Chris Hatcher resigned to take the same position at Samford. He finished at Murray State with a five-year record of 27–30.

== Schedule ==
Date	Time	Opponent	Site	TV	Result	Attendance
August 28	7:00 pm	Union (KY)*	Roy Stewart Stadium; Murray, KY	OVCDN	W 73–26	5,136
September 6	6:00 pm	at No. 25 (FBS) Louisville*	Papa John's Cardinal Stadium; Louisville, KY	ESPN3	L 21–66	50,179
September 20	6:00 pm	at Western Michigan*	Waldo Stadium; Kalamazoo, MI	ESPN3	L 14–45	22,226
September 27	6:00 pm	No. 8 Jacksonville State	Roy Stewart Stadium; Murray, KY	OVCDN	L 28–52	10,897
October 4	7:00 pm	at Tennessee Tech	Tucker Stadium; Cookeville, TN	OVCDN	L 27–30 ^{OT}	7,214
October 11	3:00 pm	No. 23 Southeast Missouri State^{†}	Roy Stewart Stadium; Murray, KY	OVCDN	W 44–41	5,636
October 18	6:00 pm	at Austin Peay	Governors Stadium; Clarksville, TN	ESPN3	L 13–20	3,312
October 25	3:00 pm	Kentucky Wesleyan*	Roy Stewart Stadium; Murray, KY	OVCDN	W 86–29	2,910
November 1	1:00 pm	Tennessee–Martin	Roy Stewart Stadium; Murray, KY	OVCDN	L 38–62	2,176
November 8	12:00 pm	at Eastern Illinois	O'Brien Stadium; Charleston, IL	OVCDN	L 26–48	3,693
November 15	12:00 pm	at No. 18 Eastern Kentucky	Roy Kidd Stadium; Richmond, KY	OVCDN	L 36–43	3,100
November 22	1:00 pm	Tennessee State	Roy Stewart Stadium; Murray, KY	OVCDN	L 33–48	1,962
*Non-conference game; ^{†}Homecoming; Rankings from The Sports Network Poll released prior to the game; All times are in Central time

- Source: Schedule
