= 2014 Austin Peay Governors football team =

American college football season

2014 Austin Peay Governors football
- Conference: Ohio Valley Conference
- Record: 1–11 (1–7 OVC)
- Head coach: Kirby Cannon (2nd season)
- Offensive coordinator: Josh Richards
- Home stadium: Governors Stadium

2014 Ohio Valley Conference football standings
	Conf.			Overall
Team	W		L	W		L
No. 9 Jacksonville State $^	8	–	0	10	–	2
No. 21 Eastern Kentucky ^	6	–	2	9	–	4
UT Martin	5	–	3	6	–	6
Eastern Illinois	5	–	3	5	–	7
Tennessee Tech	4	–	4	5	–	7
Tennessee State	3	–	5	6	–	6
SE Missouri State	3	–	5	5	–	7
Murray State	1	–	7	3	–	9
Austin Peay	1	–	7	1	–	11
$ – Conference champion; ^ – FCS playoff participant; Rankings from The Sports Network poll

The 2014 Austin Peay Governors football team represented Austin Peay State University during the 2014 NCAA Division I FCS football season. The Governors were led by second-year head coach Kirby Cannon, played their home games at Governors Stadium, and were a member of the Ohio Valley Conference. They finished the season 1–11, 1–7 in OVC play to finish in a tie for eighth place.

== Schedule ==
Date	Time	Opponent	Site	TV	Result	Attendance
August 30	6:00 pm	at Memphis*	Liberty Bowl Memorial Stadium; Memphis, TN	ESPN3	L 0–63	27,361
September 13	4:00 pm	No. 14 Chattanooga*	Governors Stadium; Clarksville, TN	APSU-TV	L 6–42	6,883
September 20	1:30 pm	at Eastern Illinois	O'Brien Field; Charleston, IL		L 7–63	9,169
September 27	6:30 pm	at No. 23 Illinois State*	Hancock Stadium; Normal, IL	RTV	L 6–55	8,443
October 4	6:00 pm	No. 19 Eastern Kentucky	Governors Stadium; Clarksville, TN	APSU-TV	L 0–31	3,858
October 11	3:00 pm	at Mercer*	Moye Complex; Macon, GA	ESPN3	L 21–49	8,027
October 18	6:00 pm	Murray State	Governors Stadium; Clarksville, TN	ESPN3	W 20–13	3,312
October 25	2:00 pm	at Tennessee–Martin	Graham Stadium; Martin, TN (Sgt. York Trophy)	OVCDN	L 7–37	5,151
November 1	3:00 pm	at No. 5 Jacksonville State	JSU Stadium; Jacksonville, AL	OVCDN	L 0–56	17,952
November 8	4:00 pm	Tennessee State^{†}	Governors Stadium; Clarksville, TN (Sgt. York Trophy)	APSU-TV	L 27–31	6,143
November 15	1:00 pm	at Southeast Missouri State	Houck Stadium; Cape Girardeau, MO	OVCDN	L 7–42	2,049
November 22	4:00 pm	Tennessee Tech	Governors Stadium; Clarksville, TN (Sgt. York Trophy)	APSU-TV	L 15–41	4,010
*Non-conference game; ^{†}Homecoming; Rankings from The Sports Network Poll released prior to the game; All times are in Central time

- Source: Schedule
  APSUTV airs across the state on Charter Channel 99, CDE Lightband Channel 9, and U-Verse 99. It is also the broadcast OVC Digital Network uses for its free stream.
