= 2014 Southeast Missouri State Redhawks football team =

American college football season

2014 Southeast Missouri State Redhawks football
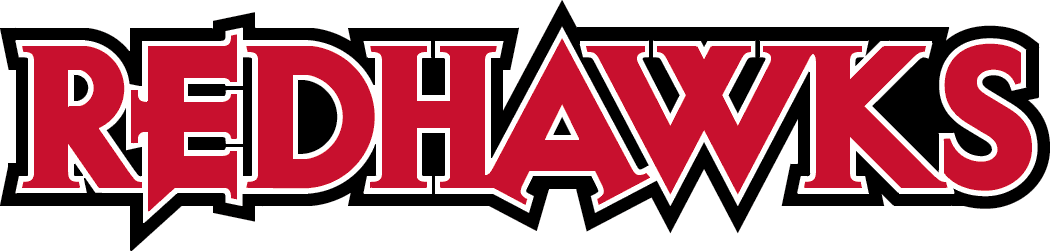
- Conference: Ohio Valley Conference
- Record: 5–7 (3–5 OVC)
- Head coach: Tom Matukewicz (1st season)
- Offensive coordinator: Sherard Poteete (1st season)
- Defensive coordinator: Bryce Saia (1st season)
- Home stadium: Houck Stadium

2014 Ohio Valley Conference football standings
	Conf.			Overall
Team	W		L	W		L
No. 9 Jacksonville State $^	8	–	0	10	–	2
No. 21 Eastern Kentucky ^	6	–	2	9	–	4
UT Martin	5	–	3	6	–	6
Eastern Illinois	5	–	3	5	–	7
Tennessee Tech	4	–	4	5	–	7
Tennessee State	3	–	5	6	–	6
SE Missouri State	3	–	5	5	–	7
Murray State	1	–	7	3	–	9
Austin Peay	1	–	7	1	–	11
$ – Conference champion; ^ – FCS playoff participant; Rankings from The Sports Network poll

The 2014 Southeast Missouri State Redhawks football team represented Southeast Missouri State University as a member of the Ohio Valley Conference (OVC) during the 2014 NCAA Division I FCS football season. Led by first-year head coach Tom Matukewicz, the Redhawks compiled an overall record of 5–7 with a mark of 3–5 in conference play, tying for sixth place in the OVC. Southeast Missouri State played home games at Houck Stadium in Cape Girardeau, Missouri.

== Schedule ==
Date	Time	Opponent	Rank	Site	TV	Result	Attendance
August 28	6:00 pm	Missouri Baptist*		Houck Stadium; Cape Girardeau, MO	OVCDN	W 77–0	7,143
September 6	6:00 pm	at Kansas*		Memorial Stadium; Lawrence, KS	ESPN3	L 28–34	36,574
September 13	6:00 pm	at No. 20 Southern Illinois*		Saluki Stadium; Carbondale, IL		L 23–50	10,385
September 20	6:00 pm	No. 3 Southeastern Louisiana*		Houck Stadium; Cape Girardeau, MO	OVCDN	W 24–23	7,538
September 27	6:00 pm	at UT Martin		Graham Stadium; Martin, TN	OVCDN	W 31–27	3,648
October 4	1:00 pm	No. 21 Tennessee State^{†}		Houck Stadium; Cape Girardeau, MO	OVCDN	W 28–21	8,089
October 11	3:00 pm	at Murray State	No. 23	Roy Stewart Stadium; Murray, KY		L 41–44 ^{OT}	5,636
October 18	1:00 pm	Eastern Illinois		Houck Stadium; Cape Girardeau, MO	OVCDN	L 13–52	4,114
October 25	2:00 pm	at No. 19 Eastern Kentucky		Roy Kidd Stadium; Richmond, KY	OVCDN	L 21–33	10,300
November 8	1:30 pm	at Tennessee Tech		Tucker Stadium; Cookeville, TN	ESPN3	L 26–27	9,820
November 15	1:00 pm	Austin Peay		Houck Stadium; Cape Girardeau, MO	OVCDN	W 42–7	2,049
November 22	1:00 pm	No. 4 Jacksonville State		Houck Stadium; Cape Girardeau, MO	OVCDN	L 30–49	2,201
*Non-conference game; ^{†}Homecoming; Rankings from The Sports Network Poll released prior to the game; All times are in Central time

== Ranking movements ==
Ranking movements Legend: ██ Increase in ranking ██ Decrease in ranking — = Not ranked RV = Received votes
	Week														
Poll	Pre	1	2	3	4	5	6	7	8	9	10	11	12	13	Final
Sports Network	—	RV	RV	—	RV	RV	23	RV	RV	—	—	—	—	—	
Coaches	—	—	—	—	RV	RV	RV	RV	—	—	—	—	—	—	

== Coaching staff ==
Name	Position
Tom Matukewicz	Head coach
Jon Wiemers	Assistant Head Coach/Offensive Line
Bryce Saia	Defensive Coordinator
Sherard Poteete	Offensive Coordinator/Quarterbacks
Eric Burrow	Safeties/Recruiting Coordinator
Salim Powell	Wide Receivers
Matt Martin	Running Backs/Special Teams
Ricky Coon	Defensive Line
Travis Fisher	Cornerbacks
Willie Ponder	Offensive Assistant
Bryan Curry	Offensive Assistant
Steve Hendry	Defensive Assistant
Joe Uhls	Football Operations
