= 2014 Tennessee State Tigers football team =

American college football season

2014 Tennessee State Tigers football
- Conference: Ohio Valley Conference
- Record: 6–6 (3–5 OVC)
- Head coach: Rod Reed (5th season)
- Offensive coordinator: Mike Jones (5th season)
- Co-defensive coordinators: Osita Alaribe (4th season); Justin Roberts (4th season)
- Home stadium: LP Field; Hale Stadium

2014 Ohio Valley Conference football standings
| | Conf. | | | Overall |
| Team | W | | L | W | | L |
|---|---|---|---|---|---|---|
| No. 9 Jacksonville State $^ | 8 | – | 0 | 10 | – | 2 |
| No. 21 Eastern Kentucky ^ | 6 | – | 2 | 9 | – | 4 |
| UT Martin | 5 | – | 3 | 6 | – | 6 |
| Eastern Illinois | 5 | – | 3 | 5 | – | 7 |
| Tennessee Tech | 4 | – | 4 | 5 | – | 7 |
| Tennessee State | 3 | – | 5 | 6 | – | 6 |
| SE Missouri State | 3 | – | 5 | 5 | – | 7 |
| Murray State | 1 | – | 7 | 3 | – | 9 |
| Austin Peay | 1 | – | 7 | 1 | – | 11 |
$ – Conference champion; ^ – FCS playoff participant; Rankings from The Sports Network poll

The 2014 Tennessee State Tigers football team represented Tennessee State University as a member of the Ohio Valley Conference (OVC) in the 2014 NCAA Division I FCS football season. They were led by fifth-year head coach Rod Reed and played their home games at LP Field and at Hale Stadium. Tennessee State finished the season 6–6 overall and 3–5 in OVC play to tie for sixth place.

== Schedule ==
| Date | Time | Opponent | Rank | Site | TV | Result | Attendance |
|---|---|---|---|---|---|---|---|
| August 30 | 6:00 pm | Edward Waters* | No. 15 | LP Field; Nashville, TN (John Merritt Classic) | | W 58–6 | 10,541 |
| September 6 | 4:00 pm | at Alabama State* | No. 14 | The New ASU Stadium; Montgomery, AL | ASPiRE | L 21–27 | 15,725 |
| September 13 | 6:00 pm | vs. Jackson State* | No. 22 | Liberty Bowl Memorial Stadium; Memphis, TN (Southern Heritage Classic) | | W 35–7 | 46,914 |
| September 20 | 2:00 pm | Tennessee Tech | No. 20 | Hale Stadium; Nashville, TN (Sgt. York Trophy) | OVCDN | W 10–7 | 9,217 |
| September 27 | 6:00 pm | Florida A&M*^{†} | No. 21 | LP Field; Nashville, TN | OVCDN | W 27–7 | 29,225 |
| October 4 | 1:00 pm | at Southeast Missouri State | No. 21 | Houck Stadium; Cape Girardeau, MO | OVCDN | L 21–28 | 8,089 |
| October 11 | 2:00 pm | No. 8 Jacksonville State | No. 25 | Hale Stadium; Nashville, TN | ESPN3 | L 20–27 | 5,849 |
| October 18 | 2:00 pm | UT Martin | | Hale Stadium; Nashville, TN | OVCDN | L 16–21 | 6,738 |
| October 25 | 1:30 pm | at Eastern Illinois | | O'Brien Field; Charleston, IL | ESPN3 | L 3–28 | 8,289 |
| November 1 | 2:00 pm | No. 16 Eastern Kentucky | | LP Field; Nashville, TN | OVCDN | L 42–56 | 5,052 |
| November 8 | 4:00 pm | at Austin Peay | | Governors Stadium; Clarksville, TN | OVCDN | W 31–27 | 6,143 |
| November 22 | 1:00 pm | at Murray State | | Roy Stewart Stadium; Murray, KY | OVCDN | W 48–33 | 1,962 |
*Non-conference game; ^{†}Homecoming; Rankings from The Sports Network Poll released prior to the game; All times are in Central time

== Ranking movements ==
Ranking movements Legend: ██ Increase in ranking ██ Decrease in ranking — = Not ranked RV = Received votes
| | Week | | | | | | | | | | | | | | |
| Poll | Pre | 1 | 2 | 3 | 4 | 5 | 6 | 7 | 8 | 9 | 10 | 11 | 12 | 13 | Final |
|---|---|---|---|---|---|---|---|---|---|---|---|---|---|---|---|
| Sports Network | 15 | 14 | 22 | 20 | 21 | 21 | 25 | RV | RV | — | — | — | — | — | — |
| Coaches | 17 | 16 | 22 | 20 | 20 | 20 | 25 | RV | RV | — | — | — | — | — | — |
