= 2014 UT Martin Skyhawks football team =

American college football season

2014 UT Martin Skyhawks football
- Conference: Ohio Valley Conference
- Record: 6–6 (5–3 OVC)
- Head coach: Jason Simpson (9th season)
- Offensive coordinator: John Bond (1st season)
- Defensive coordinator: Jeff Byrd (3rd season)
- Home stadium: Graham Stadium

2014 Ohio Valley Conference football standings
	Conf.			Overall
Team	W		L	W		L
No. 9 Jacksonville State $^	8	–	0	10	–	2
No. 21 Eastern Kentucky ^	6	–	2	9	–	4
UT Martin	5	–	3	6	–	6
Eastern Illinois	5	–	3	5	–	7
Tennessee Tech	4	–	4	5	–	7
Tennessee State	3	–	5	6	–	6
SE Missouri State	3	–	5	5	–	7
Murray State	1	–	7	3	–	9
Austin Peay	1	–	7	1	–	11
$ – Conference champion; ^ – FCS playoff participant; Rankings from The Sports Network poll

The 2014 UT Martin Skyhawks football team represented the University of Tennessee at Martin as a member of the Ohio Valley Conference (OVC) during the 2014 NCAA Division I FCS football season. Led by ninth-year head coach Jason Simpson, the Skyhawks compiled an overall record of 6–6 with a mark of 5–3 in conference play, tying for third place in the OVC. UT Martin played home games at Graham Stadium in Martin, Tennessee.

== Schedule ==
Date	Time	Opponent	Site	TV	Result	Attendance
August 30	11:00 am	at Kentucky*	Commonwealth Stadium; Lexington, KY	SECN	L 14–59	50,398
September 6	6:00 pm	at Central Arkansas*	Estes Stadium; Conway, AR		L 24–26	10,727
September 11	6:30 pm	Cumberland (TN)*	Graham Stadium; Martin, TN	OVCDN	W 63–7	4,235
September 20	12:00 pm	No. 23 Eastern Kentucky	Graham Stadium; Martin, TN	ESPN3	L 24–49	3,208
September 27	6:00 pm	Southeast Missouri State	Graham Stadium; Martin, TN	OVCDN	L 27–31	3,648
October 4	3:00 pm	at No. 8 Jacksonville State	JSU Stadium; Jacksonville, AL	ESPN3	L 14–38	15,944
October 9	6:30 pm	Tennessee Tech	Graham Stadium; Martin, TN (Sgt. York Trophy)	OVCDN	W 17–10	2,741
October 18	2:00 pm	at Tennessee State	Hale Stadium; Nashville, TN (Sgt. York Trophy)	OVCDN	W 21–16	6,738
October 25	2:00 pm	Austin Peay^{†}	Graham Stadium; Martin, TN (Sgt. York Trophy)	OVCDN	W 37–7	5,151
November 1	1:00 pm	at Murray State	Roy Stewart Stadium; Murray, KY	OVCDN	W 62–38	2,176
November 8	3:00 pm	at No. 1 (FBS) Mississippi State*	Davis Wade Stadium; Starkville, MS	SECN	L 16–45	61,421
November 22	12:00 pm	at Eastern Illinois	O'Brien Field; Charleston, IL	OVCDN	W 37–16	2,170
*Non-conference game; ^{†}Homecoming; Rankings from The Sports Network Poll released prior to the game; All times are in Central time
