= 2014 Jacksonville State Gamecocks football team =

American college football season

2014 Jacksonville State Gamecocks football

OVC champion

NCAA Division I Second Round, L 26–37 vs. Sam Houston State
- Conference: Ohio Valley Conference

Ranking
- Sports Network: No. 9
- FCS Coaches: No. 9
- Record: 10–2 (8–0 OVC)
- Head coach: John Grass (1st season)
- Co-defensive coordinators: David Blackwell (1st season); Brandon Hall (1st season)
- Home stadium: Burgess–Snow Field at JSU Stadium

2014 Ohio Valley Conference football standings
	Conf.			Overall
Team	W		L	W		L
No. 9 Jacksonville State $^	8	–	0	10	–	2
No. 21 Eastern Kentucky ^	6	–	2	9	–	4
UT Martin	5	–	3	6	–	6
Eastern Illinois	5	–	3	5	–	7
Tennessee Tech	4	–	4	5	–	7
Tennessee State	3	–	5	6	–	6
SE Missouri State	3	–	5	5	–	7
Murray State	1	–	7	3	–	9
Austin Peay	1	–	7	1	–	11
$ – Conference champion; ^ – FCS playoff participant; Rankings from The Sports Network poll

The 2014 Jacksonville State Gamecocks football team represented Jacksonville State University as a member of the Ohio Valley Conference (OVC) during the 2014 NCAA Division I FCS football season. Led by first-year head coach John Grass, the Gamecocks compiled an overall record of 10–2 with a mark of 8–0 in conference play, winning the OVC title. Jacksonville State received the OVC's automatic bid to the NCAA Division I Football Championship playoffs. After a first-round bye, the Gamecocks lost in the second round to Sam Houston State. The team played home games at Burgess–Snow Field at JSU Stadium in Jacksonville, Alabama.

== Schedule ==
Date	Time	Opponent	Rank	Site	TV	Result	Attendance
August 29	6:30 pm	at No. 8 (FBS) Michigan State*	No. 6	Spartan Stadium; East Lansing, MI	BTN	L 7–45	75,127
September 6	5:00 pm	at Chattanooga*	No. 9	Finley Stadium; Chattanooga, TN		W 26–23 ^{OT}	14,285
September 20	3:00 pm	West Alabama*	No. 9	Burgess–Snow Field at JSU Stadium; Jacksonville, AL	WJXS	W 45–34	18,912
September 27	6:00 pm	at Murray State	No. 8	Roy Stewart Stadium; Murray, KY	OVCDN	W 52–28	10,897
October 4	3:00 pm	UT Martin	No. 8	Burgess–Snow Field at JSU Stadium; Jacksonville, AL	WJXS	W 38–14	15,944
October 11	2:00 pm	at No. 25 Tennessee State	No. 8	Hale Stadium; Nashville, TN	ESPN3	W 27–20	5,849
October 25	3:00 pm	Tennessee Tech	No. 6	Burgess–Snow Field at JSU Stadium; Jacksonville, AL	WJXS	W 49–3	14,874
November 1	3:00 pm	Austin Peay^{†}	No. 5	Burgess–Snow Field at JSU Stadium; Jacksonville, AL	WJXS	W 56–0	17,952
November 8	12:00 pm	at No. 16 Eastern Kentucky	No. 4	Roy Kidd Stadium; Richmond, KY	OVCDN	W 20–6	9,400
November 15	3:00 pm	Eastern Illinois	No. 3	Burgess–Snow Field at JSU Stadium; Jacksonville, AL	ESPN3	W 27–20	14,925
November 22	1:00 pm	at Southeast Missouri State	No. 4	Houck Stadium; Cape Girardeau, MO	OVCDN	W 49–30	2,201
December 6	1:00 pm	No. 19 Sam Houston State*	No. 3	Burgess–Snow Field at JSU Stadium; Jacksonville, AL (NCAA Division I Second Round)	ESPN3	L 26–37	10,832
*Non-conference game; ^{†}Homecoming; Rankings from The Sports Network Poll released prior to the game; All times are in Central time

== Game summaries ==
=== @ Michigan State ===
Jacksonville State @ Michigan State

Team	1	2	3	4	Total
#6 Gamecocks	0	0	7	0	7
• #8 Spartans	21	17	7	0	45

- Date: August 29
- Location: Spartan Stadium
  East Lansing, MI
- Game start: 6:30 PM CDT
- Game attendance: 75,127
- Television network: BTN

In their first game of the season, the Gamecocks lost, 45–7 to the Michigan State Spartans.

=== @ Chattanooga ===
Jacksonville State @ Chattanooga

Team	1	2	3	4	OT	Total
• #9 Gamecocks	7	10	3	0	6	26
Mocs	7	7	3	3	3	23

- Date: September 6
- Location: Finley Stadium
  Chattanooga, TN
- Game start: 5:00 PM CDT
- Game attendance: 14,285

In their second game of the season, the Gamecocks won, 26–23, in overtime, over the Chattanooga Mocs.

=== West Alabama ===
West Alabama @ Jacksonville State

Team	1	2	3	4	Total
Tigers	7	7	0	20	34
• #9 Gamecocks	7	17	14	7	45

- Date: September 20
- Location: JSU Stadium
  Jacksonville, AL
- Game start: 3:00 PM CDT
- Game attendance: 18,912
- Television network: WJXS

In their third game of the season, the Gamecocks won, 45–34 over the West Alabama Tigers.

=== @ Murray State ===
Jacksonville State @ Murray State

Team	1	2	3	4	Total
• #8 Gamecocks	21	14	10	7	52
Racers	14	14	0	0	28

- Date: September 27
- Location: Roy Stewart Stadium
  Murray, KY
- Game start: 6:00 PM CDT
- Game attendance: 10,897
- Television network: OVCDN

In their fourth game of the season, the Gamecocks won, 52–28 over the Murray State Racers.

=== UT Martin ===
UT Martin @ Jacksonville State

Team	1	2	3	4	Total
Skyhawks	0	7	0	7	14
• #8 Gamecocks	7	14	0	17	38

- Date: October 4
- Location: JSU Stadium
  Jacksonville, AL
- Game start: 3:00 PM CDT
- Game attendance: 15,944
- Television network: WJXS

In their fifth game of the season, the Gamecocks won, 38–14 over the UT Martin Skyhawks.

=== @ Tennessee State Tigers ===
Jacksonville State @ Tennessee State

Team	1	2	3	4	Total
• #8 Gamecocks	6	7	14	0	27
#25 Tigers	3	0	17	0	20

- Date: October 11
- Location: Hale Stadium
  Nashville, TN
- Game start: 2:00 PM CDT
- Game attendance: 5,849
- Television network: ESPN3

In their sixth game of the season, the Gamecocks won, 27–20 over the Tennessee State Tigers.

=== Tennessee Tech ===
Tennessee Tech @ Jacksonville State

Team	1	2	3	4	Total
Golden Eagles	3	0	0	0	3
• #6 Gamecocks	0	35	7	7	49

- Date: October 25
- Location: JSU Stadium
  Jacksonville, AL
- Game start: 3:00 PM CDT
- Game attendance: 14,874
- Television network: WJXS

In their seventh game of the season, the Gamecocks won, 49–3 over the Tennessee Tech Golden Eagles.

=== Austin Peay ===
Austin Peay @ Jacksonville State

Team	1	2	3	4	Total
Governors	0	0	0	0	0
• #5 Gamecocks	28	7	14	7	56

- Date: November 1
- Location: JSU Stadium
  Jacksonville, AL
- Game start: 3:00 PM CDT
- Game attendance: 17,952
- Television network: WJXS

In their eighth game of the season, the Gamecocks won, 56–0 over the Austin Peay Governors.

=== @ Eastern Kentucky ===
Jacksonville State @ Eastern Kentucky

Team	1	2	3	4	Total
• #4 Gamecocks	3	7	0	10	20
#16 Colonels	0	3	3	0	6

- Date: November 8
- Location: Roy Kidd Stadium
  Richmond, KY
- Game start: 12:00 PM CST
- Game attendance: 9,400
- Television network: OVCDN

In their ninth game of the season, the Gamecocks won, 20–6 over the Eastern Kentucky Colonels.

=== Eastern Illinois ===
Eastern Illinois @ Jacksonville State

Team	1	2	3	4	Total
Panthers	7	0	10	3	20
• #3 Gamecocks	7	13	0	7	27

- Date: November 15
- Location: JSU Stadium
  Jacksonville, AL
- Game start: 3:00 PM CST
- Game attendance: 14,925
- Television network: ESPN3

In their tenth game of the season, the Gamecocks won, 27–20 over the Eastern Illinois Panthers.

=== @ Southeast Missouri State ===
Jacksonville State @ Southeast Missouri State

Team	1	2	3	4	Total
• #4 Gamecocks	21	7	14	7	49
Redhawks	7	3	14	6	30

- Date: November 22
- Location: Houck Stadium
  Cape Girardeau, MO
- Game start: 1:00 PM CST
- Game attendance: 2,201
- Television network: OVCDN

In their eleventh game of the season, the Gamecocks won, 49–30 over the Southeast Missouri State Redhawks.

=== Sam Houston State—NCAA Division I Second Round ===
Sam Houston State @ Jacksonville State

Team	1	2	3	4	Total
• #19 Bearkats	7	17	13	0	37
#3 Gamecocks	14	12	0	0	26

- Date: December 6
- Location: JSU Stadium
  Jacksonville, AL
- Game start: 1:00 PM CST
- Elapsed time: 2:26
- Game attendance: 10,832
- Game weather: Temperature: 65 • Wind: WNW 10 • Weather: Scattered Showers
- Referee: Greg Sujack
- Television network: ESPN3

In their twelfth game of the season, the Gamecocks lost, 37–26 to the Sam Houston State Bearkats in their 2014 FCS Second Round playoff game.

== Ranking movements ==
Ranking movements Legend: ██ Increase in ranking ██ Decrease in ranking ( ) = First-place votes
	Week														
Poll	Pre	1	2	3	4	5	6	7	8	9	10	11	12	13	Final
Sports Network	6	9	9	9	8	8	8	6	6	5	4	3 (13)	4 (10)	3 (14)	9
Coaches	8	9	8	8	8	8	8	7	7	5	4	3 (2)	3 (1)	2 (1)	9
