= 2014 Eastern Illinois Panthers football team =

American college football season

2014 Eastern Illinois Panthers football
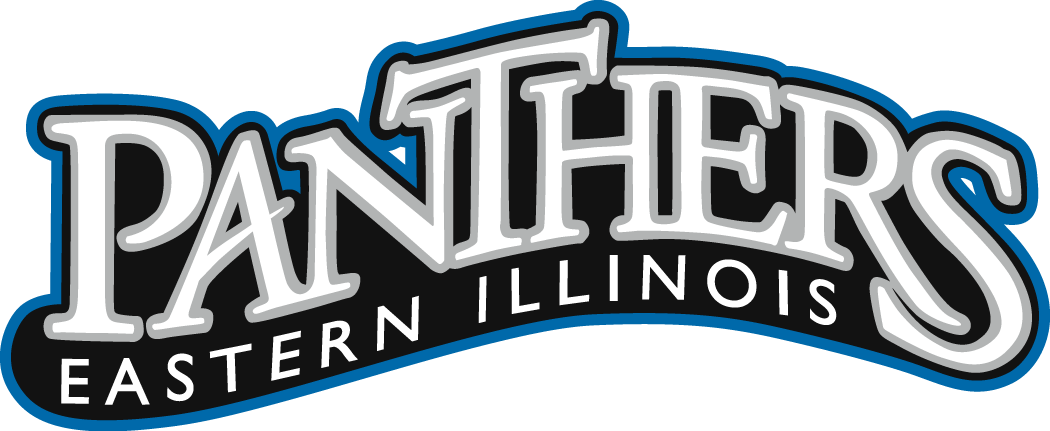
- Conference: Ohio Valley Conference
- Record: 5–7 (5–3 OVC)
- Head coach: Kim Dameron (1st season)
- Offensive coordinator: Greg Stevens (1st season)
- Defensive coordinator: Kane Wommack (1st season)
- Home stadium: O'Brien Field

2014 Ohio Valley Conference football standings
	Conf.			Overall
Team	W		L	W		L
No. 9 Jacksonville State $^	8	–	0	10	–	2
No. 21 Eastern Kentucky ^	6	–	2	9	–	4
UT Martin	5	–	3	6	–	6
Eastern Illinois	5	–	3	5	–	7
Tennessee Tech	4	–	4	5	–	7
Tennessee State	3	–	5	6	–	6
SE Missouri State	3	–	5	5	–	7
Murray State	1	–	7	3	–	9
Austin Peay	1	–	7	1	–	11
$ – Conference champion; ^ – FCS playoff participant; Rankings from The Sports Network poll

The 2014 Eastern Illinois Panthers football team represented Eastern Illinois University as a member of the Ohio Valley Conference (OVC) during the 2014 NCAA Division I FCS football season. Led by first-year head coach Kim Dameron, the Panthers compiled an overall record of 5–7 overall with a mark of 5–3 in conference play, tying for third place in the OVC. Eastern Illinois played home games at O'Brien Field in Charleston, Illinois.

== Schedule ==
Date	Time	Opponent	Rank	Site	TV	Result	Attendance
August 28	6:00 pm	at Minnesota*	No. 16	TCF Bank Stadium; Minneapolis, MN	BTN	L 20–42	44,344
September 6	6:00 pm	Southern Illinois*	No. 16	O'Brien Field; Charleston, IL	WEIU	L 21–38	9,155
September 13	12:00 pm	at Illinois State*	No. 25	Hancock Stadium; Normal, IL (Mid-America Classic)	CSNC	L 15–34	12,570
September 20	1:30 pm	Austin Peay		O'Brien Field; Charleston, IL	WEIU	W 63–7	9,169
September 27	2:00 pm	at Ohio*		Peden Stadium; Athens, OH	ESPN3	L 19–34	23,027
October 11	5:00 pm	at No. 17 Eastern Kentucky		Roy Kidd Stadium; Richmond, KY	OVCDN	L 33–36	5,700
October 18	1:00 pm	at SE Missouri State		Houck Stadium; Cape Girardeau, MO	OVCDN	W 52–13	4,114
October 25	1:30 pm	Tennessee State^{†}		O'Brien Field; Charleston, IL	ESPN3	W 28–3	8,289
November 1	1:30 pm	at Tennessee Tech		Tucker Stadium; Cookeville, TN	OVCDN	W 41–10	1,427
November 8	12:00 pm	Murray State		O'Brien Field; Charleston, IL	WEIU	W 48–26	3,693
November 15	3:00 pm	at No. 3 Jacksonville State		JSU Stadium; Jacksonville, AL	ESPN3	L 20–27	14,925
November 22	12:00 pm	UT Martin		O'Brien Field; Charleston, IL	WEIU	L 16–45	2,170
*Non-conference game; ^{†}Homecoming; Rankings from The Sports Network Poll released prior to the game; All times are in Central time

== Ranking movements ==
Ranking movements Legend: ██ Increase in ranking ██ Decrease in ranking — = Not ranked RV = Received votes
	Week														
Poll	Pre	1	2	3	4	5	6	7	8	9	10	11	12	13	Final
Sports Network	16	16	25	RV	RV	RV	RV	—	—	—	—	RV	—	—	
Coaches	11	14	24	RV	—	—	—	—	RV	—	—	—	—	—	
