= 2014 Eastern Kentucky Colonels football team =

American college football season

2014 Eastern Kentucky Colonels football
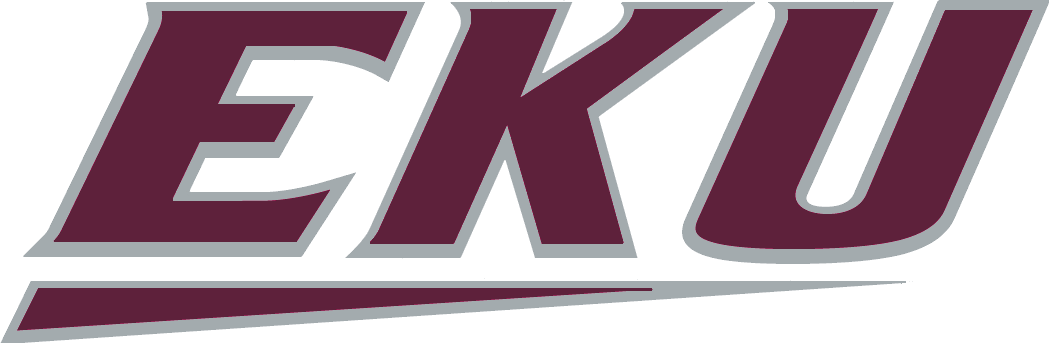

FCS Playoffs First Round, L 16–36 vs. Indiana State
- Conference: Ohio Valley Conference

Ranking
- Sports Network: No. 18
- FCS Coaches: No. 16
- Record: 9–4 (6–2 OVC)
- Head coach: Dean Hood (7th season)
- Offensive coordinator: Dane Damron (4th season)
- Defensive coordinator: Tony Hatmaker (4th season)
- Home stadium: Roy Kidd Stadium

2014 Ohio Valley Conference football standings
	Conf.			Overall
Team	W		L	W		L
No. 9 Jacksonville State $^	8	–	0	10	–	2
No. 21 Eastern Kentucky ^	6	–	2	9	–	4
UT Martin	5	–	3	6	–	6
Eastern Illinois	5	–	3	5	–	7
Tennessee Tech	4	–	4	5	–	7
Tennessee State	3	–	5	6	–	6
SE Missouri State	3	–	5	5	–	7
Murray State	1	–	7	3	–	9
Austin Peay	1	–	7	1	–	11
$ – Conference champion; ^ – FCS playoff participant; Rankings from The Sports Network poll

The 2014 Eastern Kentucky Colonels football team represented Eastern Kentucky University during the 2014 NCAA Division I FCS football season. They were led by seventh-year head coach Dean Hood and played their home games at Roy Kidd Stadium. They were a member of the Ohio Valley Conference (OVC). Eastern Kentucky had an overall record of 9–4 and a 6–2 record in OVC play to finish in second place. They received an at-large bid to the FCS Playoffs, where they lost in the first round to Indiana State.

== Schedule ==
Date	Time	Opponent	Rank	Site	TV	Result	Attendance
August 28	7:00 p.m.	at Robert Morris*		Joe Walton Stadium; Moon Township, PA		W 29–10	2,809
September 6	3:30 p.m.	at Miami (OH)*		Yager Stadium; Oxford, OH	ESPN3	W 17–10	16,670
September 13	6:00 p.m.	Morehead State*		Roy Kidd Stadium; Richmond, KY (Old Hawg Rifle)	OVCDN	W 55–16	16,700
September 20	1:00 p.m.	at Tennessee–Martin	No. 23	Graham Stadium; Martin, TN	ESPN3	W 49–24	3,208
October 4	7:00 p.m.	at Austin Peay	No. 19	Governors Stadium; Clarksville, TN	OVCDN	W 31–0	3,858
October 11	6:00 p.m.	Eastern Illinois	No. 17	Roy Kidd Stadium; Richmond, KY	OVCDN	W 36–33	5,700
October 18	8:00 p.m.	at Tennessee Tech	No. 13	Tucker Stadium; Cookeville, TN	OVCDN	L 31–39	4,161
October 25	3:00 p.m.	SE Missouri State^{†}	No. 19	Roy Kidd Stadium; Richmond, KY	OVCDN	W 33–21	10,300
November 1	3:00 p.m.	at Tennessee State	No. 16	LP Field; Nashville, TN	OVCDN	W 56–42	5,052
November 8	1:00 p.m.	No. 4 Jacksonville State	No. 16	Roy Kidd Stadium; Richmond, KY	OVCDN	L 6–20	9,400
November 15	1:00 p.m.	Murray State	No. 18	Roy Kidd Stadium; Richmond, KY	OVCDN	W 43–36	3,100
November 22	Noon	at Florida*	No. 14	Ben Hill Griffin Stadium; Gainesville, FL	SECN	L 3–52	83,399
November 29	1:00 p.m.	No. 25 Indiana State*	No. 16	Roy Kidd Stadium; Richmond, KY (NCAA Division I First Round)	ESPN3	L 16–36	1,941
*Non-conference game; ^{†}Homecoming; Rankings from The Sports Network Poll released prior to the game; All times are in Eastern time

== Rankings ==
Ranking movements Legend: ██ Increase in ranking ██ Decrease in ranking RV = Received votes
	Week														
Poll	Pre	1	2	3	4	5	6	7	8	9	10	11	12	13	Final
Sports Network	RV	RV	RV	23	19	19	17	13	19	16	16	18	14	16	
Coaches	RV	RV	25	22	18	18	16	12	18	16	15	20	16	18	
