= 2014 Southern Illinois Salukis football team =

American college football season

2014 Southern Illinois Salukis football
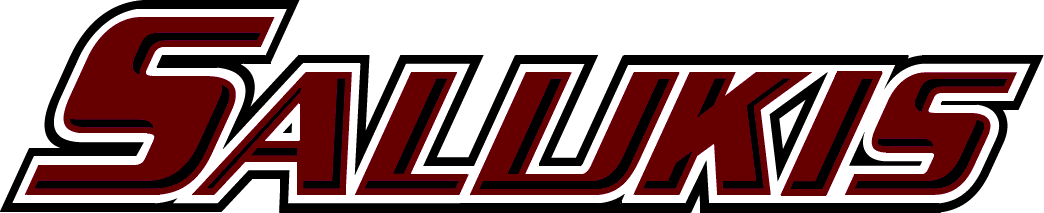
- Conference: Missouri Valley Football Conference
- Record: 6–6 (3–5 MVFC)
- Head coach: Dale Lennon (7th season)
- Co-offensive coordinators: Nick Hill (1st season); Bill O'Boyle (1st season)
- Home stadium: Saluki Stadium

2014 Missouri Valley Football Conference standings
	Conf.			Overall
Team	W		L	W		L
No. 1 North Dakota State +^	7	–	1	15	–	1
No. 2 Illinois State +^	7	–	1	13	–	2
No. 10 Northern Iowa ^	6	–	2	9	–	5
No. 12 South Dakota St. ^	5	–	3	9	–	5
No. 19 Indiana State ^	4	–	4	8	–	6
No. 22 Youngstown State	4	–	4	7	–	5
Southern Illinois	3	–	5	6	–	6
Western Illinois	3	–	5	5	–	7
Missouri State	1	–	7	4	–	8
South Dakota	0	–	8	2	–	10
+ – Conference co-champions; ^ – FCS playoff participant; Rankings from The Sports Network poll

The 2014 Southern Illinois Salukis football team represented Southern Illinois University Carbondale as a member of the Missouri Valley Football Conference (MVFC) during the 2014 NCAA Division I FCS football season. Led by seventh-year head coach Dale Lennon, the Salukis compiled an overall record of 6–6 with a mark of 3–5 in conference play, tying for seventh place in the MVFC. Southern Illinois played home games at Saluki Stadium in Carbondale, Illinois.

== Schedule ==
Date	Time	Opponent	Rank	Site	TV	Result	Attendance
August 28	7:00 pm	Taylor*		Saluki Stadium; Carbondale, IL	SAA	W 45–0	7,384
September 6	6:00 pm	at No. 16 Eastern Illinois*		O'Brien Stadium; Charleston, IL		W 38–21	9,155
September 13	6:00 pm	SE Missouri State*	No. 20	Saluki Stadium; Carbondale, IL	SAA	W 50–23	10,385
September 20	11:00 am	at Purdue*	No. 16	Ross–Ade Stadium; West Lafayette, IN	BTN	L 13–35	31,434
September 27	6:00 pm	Western Illinois	No. 17	Saluki Stadium; Carbondale, IL	SAA	W 34–17	13,170
October 4	6:00 pm	South Dakota	No. 15	Saluki Stadium; Carbondale, IL	SAA	W 41–10	8,144
October 11	1:00 pm	at No. 1 North Dakota State	No. 12	Fargodome; Fargo, ND	ESPN3	L 10–38	19,034
October 18	3:00 pm	at No. 21 Youngstown State	No. 14	Stambaugh Stadium; Youngstown, OH	ESPN3	L 14–26	12,698
October 25	6:00 pm	No. 22 Indiana State^{†}	No. 20	Saluki Stadium; Carbondale, IL	ESPN3	L 26–41	10,255
November 8	2:00 pm	at Missouri State		Robert W. Plaster Stadium; Springfield, MO		W 32–22	7,586
November 15	2:00 pm	No. 11 Northern Iowa		Saluki Stadium; Carbondale, IL	ESPN3	L 21–40	5,589
November 22	1:00 pm	at No. 8 Illinois State		Hancock Stadium; Normal, IL	CSNC	L 29–44	7,295
*Non-conference game; ^{†}Homecoming; Rankings from The Sports Network Poll released prior to the game; All times are in Central time

== Game summaries ==
=== Southeast Missouri State ===
Team	1	2	3	4	Total
Redhawks	3	17	3	0	23
• #20 Salukis	21	14	7	8	50

- Date: September 13
- Location: Saluki Stadium
  Carbondale, IL
- Game attendance: 10,385
- Television network: SAA

Scoring summary
1	11:36	SIU	Adam Fuehne 6-yard touchdown reception from Mark Iannotti, Thomas Kinney kick good	SIU 7–0
1	7:25	SIU	Malcolm Agnew 33-yard touchdown reception from Mark Iannotti, Thomas Kinney kick good	SIU 14–0
1	5:00	SIU	Malcolm Agnew 1-yard touchdown run, Thomas Kinney kick good	SIU 21–0
1	1:12	SEMO	43-yard field goal by Ryan McCrum	SIU 21–3
2	10:50	SEMO	38-yard field goal by Ryan McCrum	SIU 21–6
2	8:56	SEMO	Interception returned 56 yards for touchdown by Tim Hamm-Bey, Ryan McCrum kick good	SIU 21–13
2	6:54	SIU	Tay Willis 60-yard touchdown reception from Mark Iannotti, Thomas Kinney kick good	SIU 28–13
2	5:37	SIU	MyCole Pruitt 11-yard touchdown reception from Mark Iannotti, Thomas Kinney kick good	SIU 35–13
2	:42	SEMO	Paul McRoberts 19-yard touchdown reception from Kyle Snyder, Ryan McCrum kick good	SIU 35–20
3	10:36	SEMO	43-yard field goal by Ryan McCrum	SIU 35–23
3	7:36	SIU	LaSteven McKinney 6-yard touchdown reception from Mark Iannotti, Thomas Kinney kick good	SIU 42–23
4	14:54	SIU	MyCole Pruitt 16-yard touchdown reception from Mark Iannotti, 2-point pass good	SIU 50–23

== Ranking movements ==
Ranking movements Legend: ██ Increase in ranking ██ Decrease in ranking — = Not ranked RV = Received votes
	Week														
Poll	Pre	1	2	3	4	5	6	7	8	9	10	11	12	13	Final
Sports Network	RV	RV	20	16	17	15	12	14	20	RV	RV	RV	RV	RV	RV
Coaches	RV	25	14	13	16	16	13	17	19	25	24	22	RV	—	—

== Postseason ==
=== NFL draft ===
The following Saluki was drafted into the National Football League following the season.

Round	Pick	Player	Position	NFL team
5	143	MyCole Pruitt	Tight end	Minnesota Vikings
