= 2014 Indiana State Sycamores football team =

American college football season

2014 Indiana State Sycamores football

NCAA Division I Second Round, L 14–35 at Chattanooga
- Conference: Missouri Valley Football Conference

Ranking
- Sports Network: No. 19
- FCS Coaches: No. 18
- Record: 8–6 (4–4 MVFC)
- Head coach: Mike Sanford Sr. (2nd season)
- Offensive coordinator: Brian Sheppard (2nd season)
- Defensive coordinator: Brian Cabral (2nd season)
- Home stadium: Memorial Stadium

2014 Missouri Valley Football Conference standings
	Conf.			Overall
Team	W		L	W		L
No. 1 North Dakota State +^	7	–	1	15	–	1
No. 2 Illinois State +^	7	–	1	13	–	2
No. 10 Northern Iowa ^	6	–	2	9	–	5
No. 12 South Dakota St. ^	5	–	3	9	–	5
No. 19 Indiana State ^	4	–	4	8	–	6
No. 22 Youngstown State	4	–	4	7	–	5
Southern Illinois	3	–	5	6	–	6
Western Illinois	3	–	5	5	–	7
Missouri State	1	–	7	4	–	8
South Dakota	0	–	8	2	–	10
+ – Conference co-champions; ^ – FCS playoff participant; Rankings from The Sports Network poll

The 2014 Indiana State Sycamores football team represented Indiana State University as a member of the Missouri Valley Football Conference (MVFC) during the 2014 NCAA Division I FCS football season. Led by second-year head coach Mike Sanford Sr., the Sycamores compiled an overall record of 8–6 with a mark of 4–4 in conference play, tying for fifth place in the MVFC. Indiana State received an at large bid to the NCAA Division I Football Championship playoffs, where Sycamore defeated Eastern Kentucky in the first round before losing to Chattanooga in the second round. The team played home games at Memorial Stadium in Terre Haute, Indiana.

Connor Underwood, a junior linebacker, was named first-team All-American by The Sporting News and second-team by the Associated Press (AP). Quarterback Mike Perish set career marks for touchdowns, passing yards, attempts and pass completions. Sandford was named the Regional Coach of the Year by the American Football Coaches Association (AFCA).

== Schedule ==
Date	Time	Opponent	Rank	Site	TV	Result	Attendance
August 30	12:00 pm	at Indiana*		Memorial Stadium; Bloomington, IN	ESPNews	L 10–28	38,006
September 6	3:00 pm	Tennessee Tech*		Memorial Stadium; Terre Haute, IN		W 49–14	5,113
September 13	3:00 pm	at Ball State*		Scheumann Stadium; Muncie, IN (Blue Key Victory Bell)	ESPN3	W 27–20	15,860
September 27	3:00 pm	No. 22 Liberty*		Memorial Stadium; Terre Haute, IN	ESPN3	W 38–19	5,633
October 4	3:00 pm	No. 10 Northern Iowa	No. 25	Memorial Stadium; Terre Haute, IN		W 20–19	4,291
October 11	3:00 pm	No. 15 Illinois State^{†}	No. 20	Memorial Stadium; Terre Haute, IN	ESPN3	L 18–20	7,534
October 18	3:30 pm	at No. 1 North Dakota State	No. 22	Fargodome; Fargo, ND	ESPN3	L 17–34	18,477
October 25	7:00 pm	at No. 20 Southern Illinois	No. 22	Saluki Stadium; Carbondale, IL	ESPN3	W 41–26	10,255
November 1	1:00 pm	Missouri State	No. 19	Memorial Stadium; Terre Haute, IN		W 20–18	4,799
November 8	1:00 pm	No. 22 South Dakota State	No. 17	Memorial Stadium; Terre Haute, IN		L 17–32	4,905
November 15	2:00 pm	at No. 15 Youngstown State	No. 23	Stambaugh Stadium; Youngstown, OH	ESPN3	W 27–24 ^{OT}	9,642
November 22	2:00 pm	at Western Illinois	No. 18	Hanson Field; Macomb, IL		L 20–34	1,783
November 29	1:00 p.m.	at No. 16 Eastern Kentucky*	No. 25	Roy Kidd Stadium; Richmond, KY (NCAA Division I First Round)	ESPN3	W 36–16	1,941
December 6	1:00 p.m.	at No. 8 Chattanooga*	No. 25	Finley Stadium; Chattanooga, TN (NCAA Division I Second Round)	ESPN3	L 14–35	8,419
*Non-conference game; ^{†}Homecoming; Rankings from The Sports Network Poll released prior to the game; All times are in Eastern time

== Rankings ==
Ranking movements Legend: ██ Increase in ranking ██ Decrease in ranking — = Not ranked RV = Received votes
	Week														
Poll	Pre	1	2	3	4	5	6	7	8	9	10	11	12	13	Final
Sports Network	RV	RV	—	RV	RV	25	20	22	22	19	17	23	18	25	19
Coaches	—	—	—	RV	RV	RV	22	23	24	21	19	25	18	21	18
