= Tom Matukewicz =

American football coach (born 1973)

Current position
- Title: Head coach
- Team: Southeast Missouri State
- Conference: OVC–Big South
- Record: 67–68

Biographical details
- Born: August 5, 1973 (age 53); St. Joseph, Missouri, U.S.
- Education: Fort Hays State (1997)

Coaching career (HC unless noted)
- 1996–1997: Fort Hays State (DL/ST)
- 1997–1999: Pittsburg State (OL/TE)
- 1999–2000: Coffeyville (OL/TE)
- 2000–2001: Emporia State (DL)
- 2001–2007: Southern Illinois (LB)
- 2008–2010: Northern Illinois (LB)
- 2010: Northern Illinois (interim HC)
- 2011: Northern Illinois (LB)
- 2012–2013: Toledo (DC)
- 2014–present: Southeast Missouri State

Head coaching record
- Overall: 68–68
- Bowls: 1–0
- Tournaments: 1–4 (NCAA D–I playoffs)

Accomplishments and honors

Championships
- 2 OVC (2019, 2022); 1 Big South–OVC (2024)

Awards
- OVC Coach of the Year (2018)

Thomas M. Matukewicz (/məˈtuːkəwɪts/ mə-TOO-kə-wits; born August 5, 1973), also known as "Coach Tuke", is an American football coach. He is the head football coach at Southeast Missouri State University. Matukewicz was formerly the defensive coordinator coach at the University of Toledo. Previously, he served as an assistant coach under Jerry Kill from 2000 to 2010 with three different schools. He was also the interim head coach for Northern Illinois during the 2010 Humanitarian Bowl.

== Head coaching record ==
Year	Team	Overall	Conference	Standing	Bowl/playoffs	STATS^{#}	Coaches^{°}
Northern Illinois Huskies (Mid-American Conference) (2010)
2010	Northern Illinois	1–0	0–0	1st (West)	W Humanitarian*		
Northern Illinois:		1–0	0–0	*Interim head coach for bowl game.			
Southeast Missouri State Redhawks (Ohio Valley Conference) (2014–2022)
2014	Southeast Missouri State	5–7	3–5	T–6th			
2015	Southeast Missouri State	4–7	3–4	5th			
2016	Southeast Missouri State	3–8	3–5	7th			
2017	Southeast Missouri State	3–8	3–5	T–5th			
2018	Southeast Missouri State	9–4	6–2	2nd	L NCAA Division I Second Round	15	16
2019	Southeast Missouri State	9–4	7–1	T–1st	L NCAA Division I First Round	17	16
2020–21	Southeast Missouri State	4–4	4–3	4th			
2021	Southeast Missouri State	4–7	4–2	T–2nd			
2022	Southeast Missouri State	9–3	5–0	T–1st	L NCAA Division I First Round	15	13
Southeast Missouri State Redhawks (Big South–OVC Football Association) (2023–present)
2023	Southeast Missouri State	4–7	3–3	5th			
2024	Southeast Missouri State	9–4	6–2	T–1st	L NCAA Division I First Round	16	17
2025	Southeast Missouri State	4–8	3–5	T–6th			
2026	Southeast Missouri State	7-5	5-2				
Southeast Missouri State:		74-73	53–36				
Total:		75–73					
National championship Conference title Conference division title or championship game berth
