= 2014 Tennessee Tech Golden Eagles football team =

American college football season

2014 Tennessee Tech Golden Eagles football
- Conference: Ohio Valley Conference
- Record: 5–7 (4–4 OVC)
- Head coach: Watson Brown (8th season)
- Offensive coordinator: Steven Brown (3rd season)
- Offensive scheme: Multiple spread
- Defensive coordinator: Donn Landholm (2nd season)
- Base defense: Multiple 4–2–5
- Home stadium: Tucker Stadium

2014 Ohio Valley Conference football standings
	Conf.			Overall
Team	W		L	W		L
No. 9 Jacksonville State $^	8	–	0	10	–	2
No. 21 Eastern Kentucky ^	6	–	2	9	–	4
UT Martin	5	–	3	6	–	6
Eastern Illinois	5	–	3	5	–	7
Tennessee Tech	4	–	4	5	–	7
Tennessee State	3	–	5	6	–	6
SE Missouri State	3	–	5	5	–	7
Murray State	1	–	7	3	–	9
Austin Peay	1	–	7	1	–	11
$ – Conference champion; ^ – FCS playoff participant; Rankings from The Sports Network poll

The 2014 Tennessee Tech Golden Eagles football team represented Tennessee Technological University as a member of Ohio Valley Conference (OVC) during the 2014 NCAA Division I FCS football season. Led by eighth-year head coach Watson Brown, the Golden Eagles compiled an overall record of 5–7 overall with a mark of 4–4 in conference play, placing fifth in the OVC. Tennessee Tech played home games at Tucker Stadium in Cookeville, Tennessee.

== Schedule ==
Date	Time	Opponent	Site	TV	Result	Attendance
August 28	7:00 pm	Kentucky Christian*	Tucker Stadium; Cookeville, TN	WCTE	W 33–7	10,697
September 6	2:00 pm	at Indiana State*	Memorial Stadium; Terre Haute, IN		L 14–49	5,113
September 20	2:00 pm	at No. 20 Tennessee State	Hale Stadium; Nashville, TN (Sgt. York Trophy)	OVCDN	L 7–10	9,217
September 27	4:00 pm	at No. 10 Northern Iowa*	UNI-Dome; Cedar Falls, IA		L 7–50	9,621
October 4	7:00 pm	Murray State	Tucker Stadium; Cookeville, TN	WCTE	W 30–27 ^{OT}	7,214
October 9	6:30 pm	at UT Martin	Graham Stadium; Martin, TN (Sgt. York Trophy)	OVCDN	L 10–17	2,741
October 18	7:00 pm	No. 13 Eastern Kentucky	Tucker Stadium; Cookeville, TN	WCTE	W 39–31	4,161
October 25	3:00 pm	at No. 6 Jacksonville State	Burgess–Snow Field at JSU Stadium; Jacksonville, AL	OVCDN	L 3–49	14,874
November 1	1:30 pm	Eastern Illinois	Tucker Stadium; Cookeville, TN	WCTE	L 10–41	1,427
November 8	1:30 pm	Southeast Missouri State^{†}	Tucker Stadium; Cookeville, TN	ESPN3	W 27–26	9,820
November 15	1:30 pm	No. 9 Chattanooga*	Tucker Stadium; Cookeville, TN	WCTE	L 17–38	4,009
November 22	4:00 pm	at Austin Peay	Governors Stadium; Clarksville, TN (Sgt. York Trophy)	OVCDN	W 41–15	4,010
*Non-conference game; ^{†}Homecoming; Rankings from The Sports Network Poll released prior to the game; All times are in Central time
