= Kirby Cannon =

American football player and coach (born 1958)

Biographical details
- Born: January 18, 1958 (age 68)

Playing career
- 1979–1980: Southwest Missouri State
- Position: Quarterback

Coaching career (HC unless noted)
- 1983–1984: Iowa State (GA)
- 1985–1988: North Central (DC/DB)
- 1989–1992: Truman State (DB/RC)
- 1993–1994: Truman State (DC/DB/RC)
- 1995–1996: Northern Michigan (AHC/DC/RC)
- 1997–1998: Western Illinois (DB)
- 1999–2009: Missouri–Rolla / Missouri S&T
- 2010–2012: Central Michigan (DB)
- 2013–2015: Austin Peay
- 2017–2022: Northern Michigan (AHC/DC)
- 2023: Quincy (DB)
- 2024–2025: UVA Wise (DC/DB)

Head coaching record
- Overall: 36–120

Kirby Cannon (born January 18, 1958) is an American college football coach and former player. He most recently served as the defensive coordinator and defensive backs coach for the University of Virginia's College at Wise, positions he has held from 2024 to 2025. He was the head football coach at Austin Peay State University (APSU), a position he held from March 2013 to November 2015. He served in the same capacity at Missouri University of Science and Technology (Missouri S&T) from 1999 to 2009, compiling a record of 35 wins and 86 losses. In January 2017, Cannon was tapped to be the defensive coordinator for the Northern Michigan Wildcats.

== Head coaching record ==
Year	Team	Overall	Conference	Standing	Bowl/playoffs
Missouri–Rolla Miners (Mid-America Intercollegiate Athletics Association) (1999–2004)
1999	Missouri–Rolla	0–11	0–9	10th	
2000	Missouri–Rolla	2–9	0–9	10th	
2001	Missouri–Rolla	2–9	0–9	10th	
2002	Missouri–Rolla	0–11	0–9	10th	
2003	Missouri–Rolla	0–11	0–9	10th	
2004	Missouri–Rolla	3–8	2–7	T–8th	
Missouri–Rolla Miners (NCAA Division II independent) (2005)
2005	Missouri–Rolla	7–4			
Missouri–Rolla Miners (Great Lakes Football Conference) (2006–2008)
2006	Missouri–Rolla	6–5	2–3	4th	
2007	Missouri–Rolla	4–7	3–2	T–2nd	
2008	Missouri–Rolla	7–4	3–1	1st	
Missouri S&T Miners (Great Lakes Football Conference) (2009)
2009	Missouri S&T	4–7	2–1	2nd	
Missouri S&T:		35–86	12–59		
Austin Peay Governors (Ohio Valley Conference) (2013–2015)
2013	Austin Peay	0–12	0–8	9th	
2014	Austin Peay	1–11	1–7	T–8th	
2015	Austin Peay	0–11	0–8	9th	
Austin Peay:		1–34	1–23		
Total:		36–120			
