= 2014 Illinois State Redbirds football team =

American college football season

2014 Illinois State Redbirds football

MVFC co-champion

NCAA Division I Championship Game, L 27–29 vs. North Dakota State
- Conference: Missouri Valley Football Conference

Ranking
- Sports Network: No. 2
- FCS Coaches: No. 2
- Record: 13–2 (7–1 MVFC)
- Head coach: Brock Spack (6th season)
- Offensive coordinator: Kurt Beathard (1st season)
- Defensive coordinator: Spence Nowinsky (1st season)
- MVPs: Tre Roberson; Mike Banks
- Captains: Chris Highland; Dontae McCoy; Marshaun Coprich
- Home stadium: Hancock Stadium

2014 Missouri Valley Football Conference standings
	Conf.			Overall
Team	W		L	W		L
No. 1 North Dakota State +^	7	–	1	15	–	1
No. 2 Illinois State +^	7	–	1	13	–	2
No. 10 Northern Iowa ^	6	–	2	9	–	5
No. 12 South Dakota St. ^	5	–	3	9	–	5
No. 19 Indiana State ^	4	–	4	8	–	6
No. 22 Youngstown State	4	–	4	7	–	5
Southern Illinois	3	–	5	6	–	6
Western Illinois	3	–	5	5	–	7
Missouri State	1	–	7	4	–	8
South Dakota	0	–	8	2	–	10
+ – Conference co-champions; ^ – FCS playoff participant; Rankings from The Sports Network poll

Logo for athletics at Illinois State University

The 2014 Illinois State Redbirds football team represented Illinois State University as a member of the Missouri Valley Football Conference (MVFC) during the 2014 NCAA Division I FCS football season. Led by sixth-year head coach Brock Spack, the Redbirds compiled an overall record of 13–2 with a mark of 7–1 in conference play, sharing the MVFC title with North Dakota State. Illinois State received an at-large bid to the NCAA Division I Football Championship playoffs. After a first-round bye, the Redbirds defeated Northern Iowa in the second round, Eastern Washington in the quarterfinals, and New Hampshire in the semifinals before losing to North Dakota State in the NCAA Division I Championship Game. The team played home games at Hancock Stadium in Normal, Illinois.

== Schedule ==
Date	Time	Opponent	Rank	Site	TV	Result	Attendance
September 6	6:30 pm	Mississippi Valley State*		Hancock Stadium; Normal, IL	CSNC	W 62–0	10,243
September 13	12:00 pm	No. 25 Eastern Illinois*		Hancock Stadium; Normal, IL (Mid-America Classic)	CSNC	W 34–15	12,570
September 27	6:30 pm	Austin Peay*	No. 23	Hancock Stadium; Normal, IL	RTV	W 55–6	8,443
October 4	2:00 pm	No. 9 South Dakota State^{†}	No. 22	Hancock Stadium; Normal, IL	RTV	W 45–10	10,919
October 11	2:00 pm	at No. 20 Indiana State	No. 15	Memorial Stadium; Terre Haute, IN	CSNC	W 20–18	7,534
October 18	3:00 pm	at Western Illinois	No. 10	Hanson Field; Macomb, IL	WIUtv3	W 37–34	4,641
October 25	6:00 pm	Missouri State	No. 9	Hancock Stadium; Normal, IL	RTV	W 21–7	10,164
November 1	4:00 pm	at No. 22 Northern Iowa	No. 7	UNI-Dome; Cedar Falls, IA	RTV	L 28–42	12,154
November 8	1:00 pm	No. 10 Youngstown State	No. 12	Hancock Stadium; Normal, IL	RTV	W 35–21	8,271
November 15	1:00 pm	at South Dakota	No. 8	DakotaDome; Vermillion, SD	RTV	W 45–26	6,712
November 22	1:00 pm	Southern Illinois	No. 8	Hancock Stadium; Normal, IL	CSNC	W 44–29	7,295
December 6	1:00 pm	No. 10 Northern Iowa*	No. 7	Hancock Stadium; Normal, IL (NCAA Division I Second Round)	ESPN3	W 41–21	5,575
December 13	3:00 pm	at No. 4 Eastern Washington*	No. 7	Roos Field; Cheney, WA (NCAA Division I Quarterfinal)	ESPN3	W 59–46	6,239
December 20	1:00 pm	at No. 1 New Hampshire*	No. 7	Cowell Stadium; Durham, NH (NCAA Division I Semifinal)	ESPNU	W 21–18	9,497
January 10	12:00 pm	vs. No. 2 North Dakota State	No. 7	Toyota Stadium; Frisco, TX (NCAA Division I Championship Game)	ESPN2	L 27–29	20,918
*Non-conference game; ^{†}Homecoming; Rankings from The Sports Network Poll released prior to the game; All times are in Central time

== Ranking movements ==
Ranking movements Legend: ██ Increase in ranking ██ Decrease in ranking RV = Received votes
	Week														
Poll	Pre	1	2	3	4	5	6	7	8	9	10	11	12	13	Final
Sports Network	RV	RV	RV	RV	23	22	15	10	9	7	12	8	8	7	2
Coaches	RV	RV	RV	24	22	22	15	9	9	6	12	7	7	7	2

== Redbirds drafted ==
Draft Year	Player	Position	Round	Overall	NFL Team
2015	James O'Shaughnessy	TE	5	173	Kansas City Chiefs
