= 2014 Northern Iowa Panthers football team =

American college football season

2014 Northern Iowa Panthers football

FNCAA Division I Second Round, L 21–41 at Illinois State
- Conference: Missouri Valley Football Conference

Ranking
- Sports Network: No. 10
- FCS Coaches: No. 10
- Record: 9–5 (6–2 MVFC)
- Head coach: Mark Farley (14th season)
- Co-offensive coordinators: Bill Salmon (14th season); Mario Verduzco (9th season)
- Offensive scheme: Multiple
- Defensive coordinator: Jeremiah Johnson (2nd season)
- Base defense: 3–4
- Home stadium: UNI-Dome

2014 Missouri Valley Football Conference standings
	Conf.			Overall
Team	W		L	W		L
No. 1 North Dakota State +^	7	–	1	15	–	1
No. 2 Illinois State +^	7	–	1	13	–	2
No. 10 Northern Iowa ^	6	–	2	9	–	5
No. 12 South Dakota St. ^	5	–	3	9	–	5
No. 19 Indiana State ^	4	–	4	8	–	6
No. 22 Youngstown State	4	–	4	7	–	5
Southern Illinois	3	–	5	6	–	6
Western Illinois	3	–	5	5	–	7
Missouri State	1	–	7	4	–	8
South Dakota	0	–	8	2	–	10
+ – Conference co-champions; ^ – FCS playoff participant; Rankings from The Sports Network poll

The 2014 Northern Iowa Panthers football team was an American football team that represented the University of Northern Iowa as a member of the Missouri Valley Football Conference (MVFC) during the 2014 NCAA Division I FCS football season. In its 14th year under head coach Mark Farley, the team compiled a 9–5 record (6–2 in conference games), outscored opponents by a total of 452 to 279, and finished third in the MVFC. Northern Iowa received an at-large bid to Divison I FCS playoffs, where the Panthers defeated Stephen F. Austin in the first round before losing to Illinois State in the second round.

Placekicker Michael Schmadeke, offensive lineman Jack Rummells, running back David Johnson, and defensive lineman Xavier Williams received first-team FCS All-America honors. Six Northern Iowa players were selected as first-team players on the 2014 all-MVFC football team: Johnson; Rummells; Schmadeke; Williams; linebacker Jake Farley; and defensive back Tim Kilfoy. Four others were named to the second team.

Schmadekey converted 27 of 29 field gobal attempts and 51 of 53 extra-point attempts, led the team in scoring with 132 points (including a school record 20 points againat Tennessee Tech), and was named the FCS national placekicker of the year. David Johnson was named the FCS national all-purpose performer, set school records with 2,527 all-purpose yards (an average of 180.5 yards per game) and 1,553 rushing yards, led the team with 20 touchdowns (17 rushing, two receiving, and one on a kickoff return), and gained an average of 36.5 yards per kickoff return.

Other notable achievements include Isaac Ales with 18 tackles for loss, Tim Kilfoy with two interceptions returned for touchdowns, and Logan Bieghler (90 punts for 3,708 yards, an average of 41.2 yards per punt.

The team played its home games at the UNI-Dome in Cedar Falls, Iowa.

== Schedule ==
Date	Time	Opponent	Rank	Site	TV	Result	Attendance
August 30	11:00 am	at Iowa*	No. 9	Kinnick Stadium; Iowa City, IA	BTN	L 23–31	66,805
September 13	11:00 pm	at Hawaii*	No. 10	Aloha Stadium; Halawa, HI		L 24–27	24,999
September 20	4:00 pm	Northern Colorado*^{†}	No. 11	UNI-Dome; Cedar Falls, IA	PSN	W 46–7	15,227
September 27	4:00 pm	Tennessee Tech*	No. 10	UNI-Dome; Cedar Falls, IA	PSN	W 50–7	9,621
October 4	2:00 pm	at No. 25 Indiana State	No. 10	Memorial Stadium; Terre Haute, IN		L 19–20	4,291
October 11	3:00 pm	at South Dakota	No. 21	DakotaDome; Vermillion, SD	ESPN3	W 27–16	10,219
October 18	4:00 pm	No. 18 South Dakota State	No. 20	UNI-Dome; Cedar Falls, IA	PSN	L 28–31	15,049
October 25	1:00 pm	at Western Illinois	No. 23	Hanson Field; Macomb, IL		W 27–13	2,588
November 1	4:00 pm	No. 7 Illinois State	No. 22	UNI-Dome; Cedar Falls, IA	PSN	W 42–28	12,154
November 8	4:00 pm	No. 1 North Dakota State	No. 19	UNI-Dome; Cedar Falls, IA	PSN	W 23–3	14,777
November 15	2:00 pm	at Southern Illinois	No. 11	Saluki Stadium; Carbondale, IL	ESPN3	W 40–21	5,589
November 22	4:00 pm	Missouri State	No. 11	UNI-Dome; Cedar Falls, IA	PSN	W 38–24	10,298
November 29	7:00 pm	Stephen F. Austin*	No. 10	UNI-Dome; Cedar Falls, IA (FNCAA Division I First Round)	ESPN3	W 44–10	10,307
December 6	1:00 pm	at No. 7 Illinois State*	No. 10	Hancock Stadium; Normal, IL ([NCAA Division I Second Round)	ESPN3	L 21–41	5,575
*Non-conference game; ^{†}Homecoming; Rankings from The Sports Network Poll released prior to the game; All times are in Central time

== Rankings ==
Ranking movements Legend: ██ Increase in ranking ██ Decrease in ranking
	Week														
Poll	Pre	1	2	3	4	5	6	7	8	9	10	11	12	13	Final
Sports Network	9	8	10	11	10	10	21	20	23	22	19	11	11	10	10
Coaches	15	12	11	11	10	10	21	21	23	22	20	12	11	10	10

== Media ==
The Panther Sports Network broadcast all home games live on television, marking the first time UNI had all home games on television. PSN affiliates for the 2014 season are:

- CFU Channel 15
- KCRG-TV Local 9.2 (Cedar Rapids)
- WOI-DT Channel 5 D-2 (Ames/Des Moines)
- KCAU-TV Channel 9 D-2 (Sioux City)
- KGCW Channel 26 (Davenport)

The flagship radio station is 1540 AM KXEL in Waterloo, broadcasting all home and away games on an 11-station network.
