= 2014 North Dakota State Bison football team =

American college football season

2014 North Dakota State Bison football

NCAA Division I champion MVFC co-champion

NCAA Division I Championship, W 29–27 vs. Illinois State
- Conference: Missouri Valley Football Conference

Ranking
- Sports Network: No. 1
- FCS Coaches: No. 1
- Record: 15–1 (7–1 MVFC)
- Head coach: Chris Klieman (1st season)
- Offensive coordinator: Tim Polasek (1st season)
- Offensive scheme: West Coast
- Defensive coordinator: Matt Entz (1st season)
- Base defense: 3–4
- Home stadium: Fargodome

2014 Missouri Valley Football Conference standings
	Conf.			Overall
Team	W		L	W		L
No. 1 North Dakota State +^	7	–	1	15	–	1
No. 2 Illinois State +^	7	–	1	13	–	2
No. 10 Northern Iowa ^	6	–	2	9	–	5
No. 12 South Dakota St. ^	5	–	3	9	–	5
No. 19 Indiana State ^	4	–	4	8	–	6
No. 22 Youngstown State	4	–	4	7	–	5
Southern Illinois	3	–	5	6	–	6
Western Illinois	3	–	5	5	–	7
Missouri State	1	–	7	4	–	8
South Dakota	0	–	8	2	–	10
+ – Conference co-champions; ^ – FCS playoff participant; Rankings from The Sports Network poll

The 2014 North Dakota State Bison football team represented North Dakota State University in the 2014 NCAA Division I FCS football season. They were led by first year head coach Chris Klieman. The team played their 22nd season in the Fargodome. The Bison have been members of the Missouri Valley Football Conference since the 2008 season.

The Bison ended the season by winning their fourth consecutive NCAA Division I Football Championship, beating Illinois State 29–27 in the National Championship Game. North Dakota State became the first NCAA Division I football team to win four straight NCAA titles and the second of any NCAA division to win four straight. The other four time championship team was the Augustana College Vikings, the Division III champions in the 1983–1986 seasons. The season did however see the Bison's 33 game winning streak come to an end against the UNI Panthers on the road. That streak was the longest in FCS history and the 3rd longest over the last 50 years in all NCAA football history.

== Schedule ==
Date	Time	Opponent	Rank	Site	TV	Result	Attendance
August 30	11:00 am	at Iowa State*	No. 2	Jack Trice Stadium; Ames, IA	FS1	W 34–14	54,800
September 6	7:00 pm	at Weber State*	No. 1	Stewart Stadium; Ogden, UT	NBC ND/ALT	W 24–7	14,577
September 13	2:30 pm	Incarnate Word*	No. 1	Fargodome; Fargo, ND (College GameDay)	NBC ND/ESPN3	W 58–0	19,020
September 20	2:30 pm	No. 4 Montana*	No. 1	Fargodome; Fargo, ND	NBC ND/Midco SN/ESPN3	W 22–10	18,890
October 4	3:00 pm	at Western Illinois	No. 1	Hanson Field; Macomb, IL	NBC ND/ESPN3	W 17–10	5,111
October 11	1:00 pm	No. 12 Southern Illinois^{†}	No. 1	Fargodome; Fargo, ND	NBC ND/ESPN3	W 38–10	19,034
October 18	2:30 pm	No. 22 Indiana State	No. 1	Fargodome; Fargo, ND	NBC ND/ESPN3	W 34–17	18,477
October 25	2:00 pm	at South Dakota	No. 1	DakotaDome; Vermillion, SD	NBC ND/Midco SN	W 47–7	9,823
November 1	2:30 pm	No. 18 South Dakota State	No. 1	Fargodome; Fargo, ND (Dakota Marker)	NBC ND/Midco SN/ESPN3	W 37–17	18,832
November 8	4:00 pm	at No. 19 Northern Iowa	No. 1	UNI-Dome; Cedar Falls, IA	NBC ND	L 3–23	14,777
November 15	2:00 pm	at Missouri State	No. 4	Robert W. Plaster Stadium; Springfield, MO	NBC ND	W 45–10	4,597
November 22	2:30 pm	No. 20 Youngstown State	No. 3	Fargodome; Fargo, ND	NBC ND/ESPN3	W 38–10	18,696
December 6	2:30 pm	No. 14 South Dakota State	No. 2	Fargodome; Fargo, ND (FCS Playoffs Second Round)	ESPN3	W 27–24	18,113
December 13	11:00 am	No. 6 Coastal Carolina	No. 2	Fargodome; Fargo, ND (FCS Playoffs Quarterfinal)	ESPN	W 39–32	18,049
December 19	7:00 pm	No. 19 Sam Houston State	No. 2	Fargodome; Fargo, ND (FCS Playoffs Semifinal)	ESPN2	W 35–3	18,025
January 10, 2015	12:00 pm	vs. No. 7 Illinois State	No. 2	Toyota Stadium; Frisco, TX (FCS National Championship Game)	ESPN2	W 29–27	20,918
*Non-conference game; ^{†}Homecoming; Rankings from The Sports Network Poll released prior to the game; All times are in Central time

- Source: Schedule

== Coaching staff ==
Name	Position	Year at North Dakota State	Alma mater (Year)
Chris Klieman	Head coach	4th	Northern Iowa (1990)
Matt Entz	Defensive coordinator Linebackers	1st	Wayne State (NE) (1995)
Tim Polasek	Offensive coordinator Running backs	8th	Concordia (WI) (2002)
Atif Austin	Special teams coordinator Wide receiver coach	1st	Iowa State (2003)
Jamar Cain	Defensive ends coach	1st	New Mexico State (2002)
Nick Goeser	Defensive tackles coach	5th	Wisconsin–Eau Claire (2003)
Randy Hedberg	Quarterbacks coach	1st	Minot State (1977)
Joe Klanderman	Defensive backs coach	1st	Minnesota State Mankato (2001)
Conor Riley	Tight ends Running backs	2nd	Nebraska–Omaha (2002)
Tyler Roehl	Director of football operations Equipment services	1st	North Dakota State (2009)
Brian Gordon	Director of football operations Equipment services	1st	South Florida (2002)
Jake Otten	Video coordinator	1st	Cal Poly (2013)

== Game summaries ==
=== At Iowa State ===
	1	2	3	4	Total
#2 Bison	0	17	10	7	34
Cyclones	7	7	0	0	14

=== At Weber State ===
	1	2	3	4	Total
#1 Bison	7	7	7	3	24
Wildcats	7	0	0	0	7

=== Incarnate Word ===
	1	2	3	4	Total
Cardinals	0	0	0	0	0
#1 Bison	14	14	23	7	58

=== Montana ===
	1	2	3	4	Total
#4 Grizzlies	0	10	0	0	10
#1 Bison	6	6	7	3	22

=== At Western Illinois ===
	1	2	3	4	Total
#1 Bison	3	0	0	14	17
Leathernecks	0	3	7	0	10

=== Southern Illinois ===
	1	2	3	4	Total
#12 Salukis	0	7	3	0	10
#1 Bison	3	14	7	14	38

=== Indiana State ===
	1	2	3	4	Total
#22 Sycamores	0	3	0	14	17
#1 Bison	13	7	14	0	34

=== At South Dakota ===
	1	2	3	4	Total
#1 Bison	3	20	14	10	47
Coyotes	0	7	0	0	7

=== South Dakota State ===
	1	2	3	4	Total
#18 Jackrabbits	3	7	0	7	17
#1 Bison	0	6	14	17	37

=== At Northern Iowa ===
	1	2	3	4	Total
#1 Bison	0	0	3	0	3
#19 Panthers	0	7	3	13	23

=== At Missouri State ===
	1	2	3	4	Total
#4 Bison	0	21	21	3	45
Bears	3	0	0	7	10

=== Youngstown State ===
	1	2	3	4	Total
#20 Penguins	0	0	7	7	14
#3 Bison	14	14	3	7	38

== FCS Playoffs ==
=== Second Round–South Dakota State ===
	1	2	3	4	Total
#14 Jackrabbits	0	14	3	7	24
#2 Bison	7	7	3	10	27

Overall record	Previous meeting	Result
58–40–5	11/1/2014	NDSU, 37–17

=== Quarterfinal–Coastal Carolina ===
	1	2	3	4	Total
#6 Chanticleers	10	10	6	6	32
#2 Bison	14	10	7	8	39

Overall record	Previous meeting	Result
1–0	2013 FCS Playoffs	NDSU, 48–14

=== Semifinal–Sam Houston State ===
	1	2	3	4	Total
#19 Bearkats	0	3	0	0	3
#2 Bison	7	0	14	14	35

Overall record	Previous meeting	Result
3–1	2012 FCS Playoffs	NDSU, 39–13

=== Championship–Illinois State ===
	1	2	3	4	Total
#7 Redbirds	7	0	7	13	27
#2 Bison	3	7	10	9	29

Overall record	Previous meeting	Result
6–2	2013	NDSU, 28–10

== 2015 NFL draft ==
Round	Pick	Player	Position	NFL team
5	153 (17)	Kyle Emanuel	Outside linebacker	San Diego Chargers
UFA	-	John Crockett	Running back	Green Bay Packers

== Ranking movements ==
Ranking movements Legend: ██ Increase in ranking ██ Decrease in ranking — = Not ranked RV = Received votes ( ) = First-place votes
	Week														
Poll	Pre	1	2	3	4	5	6	7	8	9	10	11	12	13	Final
Sports Network	2 (62)	1 (93)	1 (137)	1 (146)	1 (150)	1 (153)	1 (153)	1 (156)	1 (152)	1 (157)	1 (164)	4 (19)	3 (20)	2 (39)	1 (152)
Coaches	1 (18)	1 (24)	1 (25)	1 (25)	1 (26)	1 (26)	1 (25)	1 (26)	1 (26)	1 (26)	1 (26)	4	4 (1)	3 (4)	1 (25)
AP Poll	—	RV	RV	RV	RV	RV	RV	RV	RV	RV	RV	—	—	—	—
