= 2014 NCAA Division I FCS football season =

American college football season

2014 NCAA Division I FCS season

Regular season
- Number of teams: 124
- Duration: August 23 – November 22
- Payton Award: John Robertson, QB, Villanova
- Buchanan Award: Kyle Emanuel, DE, North Dakota State

Playoff
- Duration: November 29 – December 20
- Championship date: January 10, 2015
- Championship site: Toyota Stadium, Frisco, TX
- Champion: North Dakota State

NCAA Division I FCS football seasons
- «2013 2015»

The 2014 NCAA Division I FCS football season, part of college football in the United States, was organized by the National Collegiate Athletic Association (NCAA) at the Division I Football Championship Subdivision (FCS) level. The season began on August 23, 2014, and concluded with the 2015 NCAA Division I Football Championship Game played on January 10, 2015, at Toyota Stadium in Frisco, Texas. North Dakota State won its fourth consecutive title, defeating Illinois State, 29–27.

== Conference changes and new programs ==
School	2013 Conference	2014 Conference
Abilene Christian	FCS Independent	Southland
Appalachian State	SoCon	Sun Belt (FBS)
Elon	SoCon	CAA
Georgia Southern	SoCon	Sun Belt (FBS)
Houston Baptist	FCS Independent	Southland
Incarnate Word	FCS Independent	Southland
Mercer	Pioneer	SoCon
Monmouth	FCS Independent	Big South
Old Dominion	FCS Independent	C-USA (FBS)
VMI	Big South	SoCon

== Other notable changes ==
- Under a standard provision of NCAA rules, all FCS programs were allowed to play 12 regular-season games (not counting conference title games) in 2014. In years when the period starting with the Thursday before Labor Day and ending with the final Saturday in November contains 14 Saturdays, FCS programs may play 12 games instead of the regular 11. After this season, the next season in which 12-game seasons are allowed was 2019.
- On May 14, 2014, the NCAA announced its Academic Progress Rate (APR) sanctions for the 2014–15 school year. The acceptable minimum score was raised significantly for the first time since the APR was introduced, in 2004. A total of 36 programs in 11 sports were declared ineligible for postseason play after failing to meet the required APR benchmark, including the following seven FCS teams: Alabama State, Arkansas–Pine Bluff, Florida A&M, Mississippi Valley State, Prairie View A&M, Saint Francis (PA), and Savannah State.In addition these, the entire athletic program at Southern University, including the football team, was declared ineligible for postseason play for failing to supply usable academic data to the NCAA.

== FCS team wins over FBS teams ==
(FCS rankings from the Sports Network poll; FBS rankings from the AP Poll)

August 30: No. 22 Bethune-Cookman 14, Florida International 12
August 30: No. 2 North Dakota State 34, Iowa State 14
September 6: Eastern Kentucky 17, Miami (OH) 10
September 13: Abilene Christian 38, Troy 35
September 13: Indiana State 27, Ball State 20—The Victory Bell Game
September 20: Northwestern State 30, Louisiana Tech 27
September 27: Yale 49, Army 43 ^{OT}
October 11: Liberty 55, Appalachian State 48 ^{OT}

== Conference standings ==
2014 Big Sky Conference football standings
	Conf.			Overall
Team	W		L	W		L
No. 4 Eastern Washington $^	7	–	1	11	–	3
No. 13 Montana ^	6	–	2	9	–	5
No. 20 Montana State ^	6	–	2	8	–	5
No. 25 Idaho State	6	–	2	8	–	4
Cal Poly	5	–	3	7	–	5
Northern Arizona	5	–	3	7	–	5
Sacramento State	4	–	4	7	–	5
North Dakota	3	–	5	5	–	7
Southern Utah	3	–	5	3	–	9
Northern Colorado	2	–	6	3	–	8
Portland State	2	–	6	3	–	9
Weber State	2	–	6	2	–	10
UC Davis	1	–	7	2	–	9
$ – Conference champion; ^ – FCS playoff participant; Rankings from The Sports Network poll

2014 Big South Conference football standings
	Conf.			Overall
Team	W		L	W		L
No. 5 Coastal Carolina +^	4	–	1	12	–	2
No. 17 Liberty +^	4	–	1	9	–	5
Charleston Southern	3	–	2	8	–	4
Presbyterian	3	–	2	6	–	5
Monmouth	1	–	4	6	–	5
Gardner–Webb	0	–	5	4	–	8
+ – Conference co-champions; ^ – FCS playoff participant; Rankings from The Sports Network poll

2014 Colonial Athletic Association football standings
	Conf.			Overall
Team	W		L	W		L
No. 3 New Hampshire $^	8	–	0	12	–	2
No. 7 Villanova ^	7	–	1	11	–	3
No. 18 James Madison ^	6	–	2	9	–	4
No. 16 Richmond ^	5	–	3	9	–	5
William & Mary	4	–	4	7	–	5
Delaware	4	–	4	6	–	6
Maine	4	–	4	5	–	6
Stony Brook	4	–	4	5	–	7
Albany	3	–	5	7	–	5
Towson	2	–	6	4	–	8
Rhode Island	1	–	7	1	–	11
Elon	0	–	8	1	–	11
$ – Conference champion; ^ – FCS playoff participant; Rankings from The Sports Network poll

2014 Ivy League football standings
	Conf.			Overall
Team	W		L	W		L
No. 15 Harvard $	7	–	0	10	–	0
Dartmouth	6	–	1	8	–	2
Yale	5	–	2	8	–	2
Princeton	4	–	3	5	–	5
Brown	3	–	4	5	–	5
Penn	2	–	5	2	–	8
Cornell	1	–	6	1	–	9
Columbia	0	–	7	0	–	10
$ – Conference champion; Rankings from The Sports Network Poll

2014 Mid-Eastern Athletic Conference football standings
	Conf.			Overall
Team	W		L	W		L
No. 23 Bethune–Cookman +	6	–	2	9	–	3
North Carolina A&T +	6	–	2	9	–	3
South Carolina State +	6	–	2	8	–	4
North Carolina Central +	6	–	2	7	–	5
Morgan State +^	6	–	2	7	–	6
Norfolk State	4	–	4	4	–	8
Howard	3	–	5	5	–	7
Florida A&M *	3	–	5	3	–	9
Hampton	2	–	6	3	–	9
Delaware State	2	–	6	2	–	10
Savannah State *	0	–	8	0	–	12
+ – Conference co-champions; ^ – FCS playoff participant; * Florida A&M and Savannah State ineligible for FCS Playoffs due to APR violations; Rankings from The Sports Network poll

2014 Missouri Valley Football Conference standings
	Conf.			Overall
Team	W		L	W		L
No. 1 North Dakota State +^	7	–	1	15	–	1
No. 2 Illinois State +^	7	–	1	13	–	2
No. 10 Northern Iowa ^	6	–	2	9	–	5
No. 12 South Dakota St. ^	5	–	3	9	–	5
No. 19 Indiana State ^	4	–	4	8	–	6
No. 22 Youngstown State	4	–	4	7	–	5
Southern Illinois	3	–	5	6	–	6
Western Illinois	3	–	5	5	–	7
Missouri State	1	–	7	4	–	8
South Dakota	0	–	8	2	–	10
+ – Conference co-champions; ^ – FCS playoff participant; Rankings from The Sports Network poll

2014 Northeast Conference football standings
	Conf.			Overall
Team	W		L	W		L
Sacred Heart +^	5	–	1	9	–	3
Wagner +	5	–	1	7	–	4
Bryant	4	–	2	8	–	3
Saint Francis (PA) *	3	–	3	5	–	6
Duquesne	2	–	4	6	–	6
Central Connecticut	1	–	5	3	–	9
Robert Morris	1	–	5	1	–	10
+ – Conference co-champions; ^ – FCS playoff participant; * – Saint Francis (PA) ineligible for FCS playoffs due to APR violation

2014 Ohio Valley Conference football standings
	Conf.			Overall
Team	W		L	W		L
No. 9 Jacksonville State $^	8	–	0	10	–	2
No. 21 Eastern Kentucky ^	6	–	2	9	–	4
UT Martin	5	–	3	6	–	6
Eastern Illinois	5	–	3	5	–	7
Tennessee Tech	4	–	4	5	–	7
Tennessee State	3	–	5	6	–	6
SE Missouri State	3	–	5	5	–	7
Murray State	1	–	7	3	–	9
Austin Peay	1	–	7	1	–	11
$ – Conference champion; ^ – FCS playoff participant; Rankings from The Sports Network poll

2014 Patriot League football standings
	Conf.			Overall
Team	W		L	W		L
No. 11 Fordham $^	6	–	0	11	–	3
Bucknell	4	–	2	8	–	3
Lafayette	3	–	3	5	–	6
Colgate	3	–	3	5	–	7
Holy Cross	2	–	4	4	–	8
Lehigh	2	–	4	3	–	8
Georgetown	1	–	5	3	–	8
$ – Conference champion; ^ – FCS playoff participant; Rankings from The Sports Network poll

2014 Pioneer Football League standings
	Conf.			Overall
Team	W		L	W		L
San Diego $^	7	–	1	9	–	3
Jacksonville *	7	–	1	9	–	2
Dayton	6	–	2	8	–	3
Drake	6	–	2	7	–	4
Campbell	4	–	4	5	–	7
Marist	4	–	4	4	–	7
Stetson	3	–	5	5	–	7
Morehead State	3	–	5	4	–	8
Butler	2	–	6	4	–	7
Valparaiso	2	–	6	4	–	8
Davidson	0	–	8	1	–	11
$ – Conference champion; ^ – FCS playoff participant; *Jacksonville ineligible for PFL title and FCS playoffs due to matters regarding the PFL's financial aid rules

2014 Southern Conference football standings
	Conf.			Overall
Team	W		L	W		L
No. 8 Chattanooga $^	7	–	0	10	–	4
Samford	5	–	2	7	–	4
Western Carolina	5	–	2	7	–	5
Wofford	4	–	3	6	–	5
The Citadel	3	–	4	5	–	7
Furman	2	–	5	3	–	9
Mercer	1	–	6	6	–	6
VMI	1	–	6	2	–	10
$ – Conference champion; ^ – FCS playoff participant; Rankings from The Sports Network poll

2014 Southland Conference football standings
	Conf.			Overall
Team	W		L	W		L
No. 6 Sam Houston St +^	7	–	1	11	–	5
No. 14 SE Louisiana +^	7	–	1	9	–	4
Lamar	5	–	3	8	–	4
Stephen F. Austin ^	5	–	3	8	–	5
Central Arkansas	5	–	3	6	–	6
McNeese State	4	–	4	6	–	5
Abilene Christian *	4	–	4	6	–	6
Northwestern State	4	–	4	6	–	6
Incarnate Word *	2	–	6	2	–	9
Houston Baptist	1	–	7	2	–	9
Nicholls State	0	–	8	0	–	12
+ – Conference co-champions; ^ – FCS playoff participant; * – ineligible for FCS playoffs due to transition from NCAA Division II; Rankings from The Sports Network poll

2014 Southwestern Athletic Conference football standings
	Conf.			Overall
Team	W		L	W		L
East Division
Alcorn State x$	7	–	2	10	–	3
Alabama State *	5	–	4	7	–	5
Jackson State	3	–	6	5	–	7
Alabama A&M	3	–	6	4	–	8
Mississippi Valley State *	1	–	8	2	–	9
West Division
Southern xy	8	–	1	9	–	4
Grambling State	7	–	2	7	–	5
Prairie View A&M *	5	–	4	5	–	5
Texas Southern	3	–	6	5	–	6
Arkansas–Pine Bluff *	3	–	6	4	–	7
Championship: Alcorn State 38, Southern 24
$ – Conference champion; x – Division champion/co-champions; y – Championship game participant; * – ineligible for postseason due to APR violations

2014 NCAA Division I FCS independents football standings
	Conf.			Overall
Team	W		L	W		L
Charlotte		–		5	–	6
Charlotte ineligible for FCS playoffs as part of FBS transition

== Conference summaries ==
=== Championship games ===
Conference	Champion	Runner-up	Score	Offensive Player of the Year	Defensive Player of the Year	Coach of the Year
SWAC	Alcorn State	Southern	38–24	Malcolm Cyrus (RB, Alabama State); John Gibbs, Jr. (QB, Alcorn State)	Jerome Howard (LB, Prairie View A&M)	Broderick Fobbs (Grambling State)

=== Other conference winners ===
Note: Records are regular-season only, and do not include playoff games.

Conference	Champion	Record	Offensive Player of the Year	Defensive Player of the Year	Coach of the Year
Big Sky	Eastern Washington	10–2 (7–1)	Vernon Adams (QB, Eastern Washington)	Zack Wagenmann (DE, Montana)	Mike Kramer (Idaho State)
Big South	Coastal Carolina; Liberty	11–1 (4–1); 8–4 (4–1)	Alex Ross (QB, Coastal Carolina)	Quinn Backus (LB, Coastal Carolina)	Joe Moglia (Coastal Carolina); Harold Nichols (Presbyterian)
CAA	New Hampshire	10–1 (8–0)	John Robertson (QB, Villanova)	Mike Reilly (DL, William & Mary)	Sean McDonnell (New Hampshire)
Ivy	Harvard	10–0 (7–0)	Tyler Varga (RB, Yale)	Zack Hodges (DE, Harvard); Mike Zeuli (LB, Princeton)	Tim Murphy (Harvard)
MEAC	Bethune-Cookman; Morgan State; North Carolina A&T; North Carolina Central; South Carolina State	9–3 (6–2); 7–5 (6–2); 9–3 (6–2); 7–5 (6–2); 8–4 (6–2)	Tarik Cohen (RB, North Carolina A&T); Greg McGhee (QB, Howard)	Javon Hargrave (DT, South Carolina State)	Lee Hull (Morgan State)
MVFC	Illinois State; North Dakota State	10–1 (7–1); 11–1 (7–1)	Marshaun Coprich (RB, Illinois State)	Kyle Emanuel (DE, North Dakota State)	Brock Spack (Illinois State)
NEC	Sacred Heart; Wagner	9–2 (5–1); 7–4 (5–1)	Khairi Dickson (RB, Saint Francis (PA))	Jeff Covitz (DE, Bryant)	Mark Nofri (Sacred Heart)
OVC	Jacksonville State	10–1 (8–0)	Dy'Shawn Mobley (RB, Eastern Kentucky)	Devaunte Sigler (DT, Jacksonville State)	John Grass (Jacksonville State)
Patriot	Fordham	10–2 (6–0)	Mike Nebrich (QB, Fordham)	Evan Byers (LB, Bucknell)	Joe Susan (Bucknell)
Pioneer	San Diego	9–1 (7–1)	Connor Kacsor (RB, Dayton)	Donald Payne (S, Stetson)	Dale Lindsey (San Diego)
Southern	Chattanooga	9–3 (7–0)	Jacob Huesman (QB, Chattanooga)	Davis Tull (DL, Chattanooga)	Russ Huesman (Chattanooga)
Southland	Sam Houston State; Southeastern Louisiana	8–4 (7–1); 9–3 (7–1)	Bryan Bennett (QB, Southeastern Louisiana); Gus Johnson (RB, Stephen F. Austin)	Jonathan Woodard (DE, Central Arkansas)	Clint Conque (Stephen F. Austin)

== FCS results by conference against FBS opponents ==
FCS Conference	GP	Record	Win %	PF	PA	PD
Ivy League	1	1–0	1.000	49	43	+6
MVFC	12	2–10	.167	212	384	–172
Southland	13	2–11	.154	235	656	–421
Big South	8	1–7	.125	123	348	–225
OVC	11	1–10	.091	159	495	–336
MEAC	14	1–13	.071	146	673	–527
Pioneer	1	0–1	.000	0	66	–66
Patriot	2	0–2	.000	41	72	–31
NEC	2	0–2	.000	31	72	–41
SWAC	5	0–5	.000	40	224	–184
Southern	11	0–11	.000	154	443	–289
CAA	11	0–11	.000	121	487	–366
Big Sky	17	0–17	.000	266	696	–430
FCS Independents	0	0–0	–	0	0	0
TOTAL	108	8–100	.074	1577	4659	–3082

FBS Conference	GP	Record	Win %	PF	PA	PD
SEC	14	14–0	1.000	685	131	+554
ACC	14	14–0	1.000	636	173	+463
Big Ten	11	11–0	1.000	391	156	+235
MWC	10	10–0	1.000	354	157	+197
American	8	8–0	1.000	352	81	+271
Pac-12	8	8–0	1.000	410	142	+268
Big 12	8	7–1	.875	357	156	+201
MAC	13	11–2	.846	462	196	+266
Sun Belt	9	7–2	.778	445	165	+280
C-USA	9	7–2	.778	367	126	+241
FBS Independents	4	3–1	.750	200	94	+106
TOTAL	108	100–8	.926	4659	1577	+3082

== Playoff qualifiers ==
=== Automatic berths for conference champions ===
Conference	Team	Appearance	Last bid	Result
Big Sky Conference	Eastern Washington	11th	2013	Semifinals (L – Towson)
Big South Conference	Liberty	1st	–	–
Colonial Athletic Association	New Hampshire	13th	2013	Semifinals (L – North Dakota State)
Mid-Eastern Athletic Conference	Morgan State	1st	–	–
Missouri Valley Football Conference	North Dakota State	5th	2013	National Champions (W – Towson)
Northeast Conference	Sacred Heart	2nd	2013	First Round (L – Fordham)
Ohio Valley Conference	Jacksonville State	5th	2013	Quarterfinals (L – Eastern Washington)
Patriot League	Fordham	4th	2013	Second Round (L – Towson)
Pioneer Football League	San Diego	1st	–	–
Southern Conference	Chattanooga	2nd	1984	First Round (L – Arkansas State)
Southland Conference	Sam Houston State	8th	2013	Second Round (L – Southeastern Louisiana)

=== At large qualifiers ===
Conference	Team	Appearance	Last bid	Result
Big Sky Conference	Montana	23rd	2013	Second Round (L – Coastal Carolina)
Big Sky Conference	Montana State	8th	2012	Quarterfinals (L – Sam Houston State)
Big South Conference	Coastal Carolina	5th	2013	Quarterfinals (L – North Dakota State)
Colonial Athletic Association	James Madison	10th	2011	Second Round (L – North Dakota State)
Colonial Athletic Association	Richmond	9th	2009	Quarterfinals (L – Appalachian State)
Colonial Athletic Association	Villanova	11th	2012	First Round (L – Stony Brook)
Mid-Eastern Athletic Conference	None			
Missouri Valley Football Conference	Illinois State	5th	2012	Quarterfinals (L – Eastern Washington)
Missouri Valley Football Conference	Indiana State	3rd	1984	Quarterfinals (L – Middle Tennessee State)
Missouri Valley Football Conference	Northern Iowa	17th	2011	Quarterfinals (L – Montana)
Missouri Valley Football Conference	South Dakota State	4th	2013	Second Round (L – Eastern Washington)
Northeast Conference	None			
Ohio Valley Conference	Eastern Kentucky	21st	2011	First Round (L – James Madison)
Patriot League	None			
Pioneer Football League	None			
Southern Conference	None			
Southland Conference	Southeastern Louisiana	2nd	2013	Quarterfinals (L – New Hampshire)
Southland Conference	Stephen F. Austin	6th	2010	Second Round (L – Villanova)

=== Abstentions ===
- Ivy League – Harvard
- Southwestern Athletic Conference – Alcorn State

== Postseason ==
=== NCAA Division I playoff bracket ===
First Round; November 29; Campus sites
Sacred Heart	22
Fordham*	44
Indiana State	36
Eastern Kentucky*	16
San Diego	14
Montana*	52
Stephen F. Austin	10
Northern Iowa*	44
South Dakota State	47
Montana State*	40
Morgan State	24
Richmond*	46
Southeastern Louisiana	17
Sam Houston State*	21
Liberty	26
James Madison*	21

Second Round; December 6 Campus sites
Fordham	19
1	New Hampshire*	44
Indiana State	14
8	Chattanooga*	35
Montana	20
4	Eastern Washington*	37
Northern Iowa	21
5	Illinois State*	41
South Dakota State	24
2	North Dakota State*	27
Richmond	15
7	Coastal Carolina*	36
Sam Houston State	37
3	Jacksonville State*	26
Liberty	22
6	Villanova*	29

Quarterfinals; December 12 and 13; Campus sites
1	New Hampshire*	35
8	Chattanooga	30
4	Eastern Washington*	46
5	Illinois State	59
2	North Dakota State*	39
7	Coastal Carolina	32
Sam Houston State	34
6	Villanova*	31

Semifinals; December 19 and 20; Campus sites
1	New Hampshire*	18
5	Illinois State	21
2	North Dakota State*	35
Sam Houston State	3

National Championship; January 10; Toyota Stadium, Frisco, Texas
5	Illinois State	27
2	North Dakota State	29

* Home team
Winner
All times in Eastern Standard Time (UTC−05:00)

== Preseason bowl game ==
Game	Date/TV	Location	Winning Team	Losing Team	Score	MVP
Legacy Bowl	March 21, 2015	KINCHO Stadium; Osaka, Japan	Princeton; 5–5 (4–3)	Kwansei Gakuin (JAFA); 9–1 (7–0)	36–7	Chad Kanoff (QB, Princeton)

== Coaching changes ==
=== Preseason and in-season ===
This is restricted to coaching changes that took place on or after May 1, 2014. For coaching changes that occurred earlier in 2014, see 2013 NCAA Division I FCS end-of-season coaching changes.

School	Outgoing coach	Date	Reason	Replacement
Nicholls State	Charlie Stubbs	September 14	Resigned	Steve Axman (interim)
Florida A&M	Earl Holmes	October 29	Fired	Corey Fuller (interim)

=== End of season ===
School	Outgoing coach	Date announced	Reason	Replacement
Nicholls State	Steve Axman	November 20	Resigned	Tim Rebowe
VMI	Sparky Woods	November 24	Fired	Scott Wachenheim
Bethune-Cookman	Brian Jenkins	December 16	Hired by Alabama State	Terry Sims
Florida A&M	Corey Fuller	December 23	Permanent Replacement	Alex Wood

== See also ==
- 2014 NCAA Division I FCS football rankings
- 2014 NCAA Division I FBS football season
- 2014 NCAA Division II football season
- 2014 NCAA Division III football season
