= Legacy Bowl =

Kwansei Gakuin 125th Anniversary Legacy Bowl
- Bowl game
Princeton Tigers	Kwansei Gakuin Fighters
(5-5)	(9–1)
36	7
Head coach: Bob Surace	Head coach: Hideaki Toriuchi
	1	2	3	4	Total
Princeton	13	13	10	0	36
Kwansei Gakuin	0	0	0	7	7
- Stadium: KINCHO Stadium
- Location: Higashisumiyoshi-ku, Osaka, Japan
- MVP: Chad Kanoff
- Attendance: 4,500

The Legacy Bowl was an exhibition college football game played in Osaka, Japan on March 21, 2015, between Princeton University and Kwansei Gakuin University. Princeton was invited to play by Kwansei Gakuin.

== Teams ==
=== Kwansei Gakuin ===
Kwansei Gakuin wore its blue jerseys.

=== Princeton ===
Princeton wore its white jerseys.
