= O'Brien Field (Charleston) =

Stadium in Illinois, United States

- Interactive map of O'Brien Field
- Former names: Lincoln Field
- Location: 100 Grant Avenue; Charleston, IL 61920
- Coordinates: 39°28′50″N 88°10′52″W
- Owner: Eastern Illinois University
- Operator: Eastern Illinois University
- Capacity: 10,000
- Surface: Hellas Fieldturf
- Record attendance: 12,600; November 9, 1980 (vs. Northern Iowa)

Construction
- Groundbreaking: 1968
- Opened: 1970
- Renovated: 1999
- Cost: $1.7 million
- Architects: Atkins, Barrow & Graham, Inc.

Tenant
- Eastern Illinois Panthers (NCAA) (1970–present)

O'Brien Field is a 10,000-seat multi-purpose stadium in Charleston, Illinois. It is home to the Eastern Illinois University Panthers football and track and field teams. O’Brien Field is named after Maynard O'Brien who coached football and track at Eastern Illinois University. The stadium features a nine-lane track and in 2004 an artificial turf field was installed. In 2009 a state of the art scoreboard was installed on the north end of the field with a video board and new sound system.

The stadium served as the summer home for the former St. Louis Cardinals football team in 1976 and 1977 and again from 1982 to 1987.

The record attendance for O'Brien Field was 12,600 on November 9, 1980, vs. Northern Iowa. The all-time record for the Panthers football team at O'Brien Field is 178–95–3 as of the end of the 2019 season.

The stadium also plays host to the IHSA State Finals in track and field every year. The Boys Track State Finals were first held there in 1972, have been conducted there every season since 1974. The Girls State Finals have been held there every season since it was first run in 1973.

== Home records ==
Home Records
Year	Record
1970	1-4
1971	4-1
1972	0-5
1973	2-4
1974	3-2
1975	2-1-2
1976	3-3
1977	1-3
1978	7-0
1979	4-3
1980	7-0
1981	5-1
1982	7-0
1983	5-1
1984	4-2
1985	5-1
1986	7-1
1987	3-2
1988	4-2
1989	6-0
1990	3-2
1991	4-1
1992	4-1
1993	1-2-1
1994	4-2
1995	6-0
1996	3-2
1997	4-1
1998	3-3
1999	4-1
2000	5-0
2001	5-1
2002	5-0
2003	3-3
2004	3-2
2005	4-2
2006	5-1
2007	3-2
2008	3-2
2009	3-2
2010	1-4
2011	1-4
2012	5-0
2013	6-1
2014	3-2
2015	3-2
2016	2-3
2017	3-2
2018	2-3
2019	0–5
2020	1–2
2021	0–4
2022	1-4
2023	4-1
2024	3-2
Totals; 55 Years	188-1110-3.635

== Attendance ==
Attendance
Year	Games	Total attendance	Average attendance	Highest game attendance	Lowest game attendance
2002	5	35,030	7,006	10,731	3,740
2003	6	29,413	4,902	NA	NA
2005	6	37,094	6,182	NA	NA
2006	6	38,690	6,448	NA	NA
2007	5	37,058	7,411	9,861	3,083
2008	5	25,447	5,089	7,996	1,919
2009	5	38,847	7,769	11,271	3,509
2010	5	28,343	5,669	8,007	4,311
2011	5	37,937	7,587	9,111	6,157
2012	5	35,681	7,136	9,154	5,319
2013	7	56,086	8,012	11,569	3,850
2014	5	32,476	6,496	9,169	2,170
2015	5	28,387	5,677	8,104	1,438
2016	5	29,067	5,813	7,907	3,054
2017	5	24,750	4,950	8,176	2,828
2018	5	26,715	5,343	7,670	2,149
2019	5	24,413	4,883	7,055	3,170
2020^	3	3,846	1,282	1,312	1,252

^Low attendance due to the COVID-19 pandemic.

== Attendance records ==
The following are the highest attendances at O’Brien Field as of the end of the 2019 NCAA football season.

Highest attendances at O’Brien Field
Rank	Attendance	Date	Game result
1	12,600	Nov. 9, 1980	Eastern Illinois 14, Northern Iowa 9
2	12,547	Nov. 5, 1983	Eastern Illinois 12, Southwest Missouri 3
3	12,425	Nov. 13, 1982	Eastern Illinois 73, Kentucky State 0
4	12,000	Nov. 3, 1979	Eastern Illinois 21, Youngstown State 49
5	11,856	Nov. 1, 1986	Eastern Illinois 64, Winona State 0
6	11,628	Oct. 27, 2001	Eastern Illinois 52, Tennessee State 49
7	11,569	Oct. 19, 2013	Eastern Illinois 55, Southeast Missouri 33
8	11,485	Nov. 7, 1987	Eastern Illinois 27, Southern Illinois 32
9	11,469	Sept. 28, 2013	Eastern Illinois 42, Eastern Kentucky 7
10	11,321	Oct. 31, 1998	Eastern Illinois 21, Tennessee State 27

== See also ==
- List of NCAA Division I FCS football stadiums
