= Houck Stadium =

Stadium in Missouri, United States

Houck Field
- Interactive map of Houck Field
- Address: 1117 Broadway Street; Cape Girardeau, MO; United States
- Coordinates: 37°18′34″N 89°31′52″W
- Owner: Southeast Missouri State University
- Operator: SEMO Redhawks
- Capacity: 10,000
- Type: Stadium
- Surface: Fieldturf
- Current use: Football; Soccer
- Public transit: Cape Girardeau Transit Authority

Construction
- Groundbreaking: 1929
- Opened: October 3, 1930; 95 years ago
- Cost: $150,000 ($2.89 million in 2025 dollars)

Tenant
- Southeast Missouri State Redhawks (NCAA) (1930–present)

Website
- semoredhawks.com/houck-field

Houck Field is a stadium in Cape Girardeau, Missouri. It opened in 1930 and was named after famous Missouri resident Louis Houck. Today it is home to the Southeast Missouri State University Redhawks football team and women's soccer teams. The venue has a capacity of 10,000.

The stadium used to be open on both the east and west sides. Today, it is open only on the east side. On the west end of the stadium, where KRCU once stood, is a brand new, 5-story residence hall for Southeast students, with some of the rooms looking out over the stadium. The stadium is flanked on the southwest side by Houck Fieldhouse, which houses the Southeast Missouri State volleyball team.

== History ==
Houck Stadium was constructed in 1930 at a cost of $150,000. It was built on the site of a former rock quarry, which was purchased for $11,000 in 1925. It was dedicated on October 3, 1930 before a crowd of over 6,000 people. Southeast Missouri defeated Southern Illinois University that day 12–6. Houck Stadium originally consisted of 5,240 seats on the south side of the field. It was named for Louis Houck, who served 39 years as a regent for the University and as President of the Board for 36 years.

Seating on the north side of the stadium was added prior to the 1963 season. A press box was constructed on the south side of the stadium in 1979. Nearly 400 chairback seats were added in 1992 on the south side.

In 2021, the university announced that Houck Stadium would undergo major renovations, starting with the replacement of seating on the south side of the stadium. This phase was completed in 2023, and the Redhawks would play their first game in the newly renovated stadium on September 9, 2023. On October 13, during a fan event, university president Carlos Vargas confirmed that a second phase of renovations would occur, focusing on adding a brand new press box to the stadium.

== Single game attendance records ==
	Game	Date	Attendance
1	UT Martin (Win 24-17)	October 30, 2010 (homecoming)	11,126
2	Cape Central vs. Jackson (Jackson 21-0)	October 22, 2010	11,000+ (estimated)
3	Southern Illinois (Loss 7-28)	September 6, 2003	11,100
4	Eastern Kentucky (Loss 28-37)	October 2, 1999	11,015
5	Tennessee State (Win 19-17)	October 9, 2010	10,316
6	Western Kentucky (Loss 14-38)	September 23, 2000	10,222
T7	Murray State (Loss 35-45)	October 20, 2001	10,100
T7	Southern Illinois (Loss 23-58)	September 1, 2005	10,100
8	Murray State (Loss 28-38)	October 21, 2000	10,028
9	Murray State (Tie 21-21)	September 1, 1979	10,000
10	Southern Illinois (Loss 27-30)	August 31, 1995	9,827
11	Southern Illinois (Win 24-5)	September 8, 2001	9,822

== See also ==
- List of NCAA Division I FCS football stadiums
