= 2014 NCAA Division I FCS football rankings =

- Season: 2014
- Duration: August 2014 – January 2015
- National Champions: January 3, 2015

Two human polls comprise the 2014 National Collegiate Athletic Association (NCAA) Division I Football Championship Subdivision (FCS) football rankings, in addition to various publications' preseason polls. Unlike the Football Bowl Subdivision (FBS), college football's governing body, the NCAA, bestows the national championship title through a 24-team tournament. The following weekly polls determine the top 25 teams at the NCAA Division I Football Championship Subdivision level of college football for the 2014 season. The Sports Network poll is voted by media members while the Coaches' Poll is determined by coaches at the FCS level.

== Legend ==
Legend
	Increase in ranking
	Decrease in ranking
	Not ranked previous week
Italics	Number of first place votes
(#–#)	Win–loss record
т	Tied with team above or below also with this symbol

== The Sports Network poll ==
	Preseason Aug 21	Week 1 Sep 1	Week 2 Sep 8	Week 3 Sep 15	Week 4 Sep 22	Week 5 Sep 29	Week 6 Oct 6	Week 7 Oct 13	Week 8 Oct 20	Week 9 Oct 27	Week 10 Nov 3	Week 11 Nov 10	Week 12 Nov 17	Week 13 Nov 23	Week 14 (Final) Jan 12	
1.	Eastern Washington (82)	North Dakota State (93) (1–0)	North Dakota State (137) (2–0)	North Dakota State (146) (3–0)	North Dakota State (150) (4–0)	North Dakota State (153) (4–0)	North Dakota State (153) (5–0)	North Dakota State (156) (6–0)	North Dakota State (152) (7–0)	North Dakota State (157) (8–0)	North Dakota State (164) (9–0)	New Hampshire (70) (8–1)	New Hampshire (74) (9–1)	New Hampshire (93) (10–1)	North Dakota State (15–1)	1.
2.	North Dakota State (62)	Eastern Washington (63) (2–0)	Eastern Washington (21) (2–1)	Eastern Washington (15) (2–1)	Eastern Washington (9) (3–1)	Eastern Washington (8) (4–1)	Eastern Washington (3) (5–1)	Eastern Washington (4) (6–1)	Eastern Washington (2) (7–1)	New Hampshire (6–1)	New Hampshire (7–1)	Coastal Carolina (55) (10–0)	Coastal Carolina (56) (11–0)	North Dakota State (39) (11–1)	Illinois State (13–2)	2.
3.	Southeastern Louisiana (2)	Southeastern Louisiana (1–0)	Southeastern Louisiana (2–0)	Southeastern Louisiana (2–1)	Coastal Carolina (4–)	Coastal Carolina (5–0)	Coastal Carolina (6–0)	New Hampshire (5–1)	New Hampshire (5–1)	Coastal Carolina (8–0)	Coastal Carolina (9–0)	Jacksonville State (13) (8–1)	North Dakota State (20) (10–1)	Jacksonville State (14) (10–1)	New Hampshire (12–2)	3.
4.	New Hampshire (1)	Montana (0–1)	Montana (1–1)	Montana (2–1)	New Hampshire (2–1)	New Hampshire (3–1)	New Hampshire (4–1)	Coastal Carolina (7–0)	Coastal Carolina (7–0)	Villanova (7–1)	Jacksonville State (7–1)	North Dakota State (19) (9–1)	Jacksonville State (10) (9–1)	Eastern Washington (10–2)	Eastern Washington (11–3)	4.
5.	Montana	Coastal Carolina (1–0)	Coastal Carolina (2–0)	Coastal Carolina (3–0)	McNeese State (1–1)	McNeese State (2–1)	McNeese State (3–1)	Villanova (5–1)	Villanova (6–1)	Jacksonville State (6–1)	Eastern Washington (8–2)	Eastern Washington (9–2)	Eastern Washington (9–2)	Villanova (10–2)	Coastal Carolina (12–2)	5.
6.	Jacksonville State	New Hampshire (0–1)	McNeese State (0–1)	McNeese State (1–1)	Villanova (2–1)	Villanova (3–1)	Villanova (4–1)	Jacksonville State (5–1)	Jacksonville State (5–1)	Eastern Washington (7–2)	McNeese State (6–2)	Villanova (8–2)	Villanova (9–2)	Coastal Carolina (11–1)	Sam Houston State (10–2)	6.
7.	Coastal Carolina	McNeese State (0–0)	New Hampshire (0–1)	New Hampshire (1–1)	Montana (2–2)	Montana (3–2)	Montana (4–2)	Montana (4–2)	Montana (5–2)	Illinois State (7–0)	Villanova (7–2)	Fordham (9–1)	Fordham (10–1)	Illinois State (10–1)	Villanova (11–3)	7.
8.	McNeese State	Northern Iowa (0–1)	Villanova (1–1)	Villanova (1–1)	Jacksonville State (2–1)	Jacksonville State (3–1)	Jacksonville State (4–1)	Southeastern Louisiana (5–2)	Southeastern Louisiana (6–2)	Montana State (6–2)	Richmond (7–2)	Illinois State (8–1)	Illinois State (9–1)	Chattanooga (9–3)	Chattanooga (10–4)	8.
9.	Northern Iowa	Jacksonville State (0–1)	Jacksonville State (1–1)	Jacksonville State (1–1)	South Dakota State (3–1)	South Dakota State (3–1)	Southeastern Louisiana (4–2)	Montana State (5–2)	Illinois State (6–0)	McNeese State (5–2)	Fordham (8–1)	Chattanooga (7–3)	Chattanooga (8–3)	Fordham (10–2)	Jacksonville State (10–2)	9.
10.	South Dakota State	Villanova (0–1)	Northern Iowa (0–1)	South Dakota State (2–1)	Northern Iowa (1–2)	Northern Iowa (2–2)	William & Mary (4–1)	Illinois State (5–0)	Montana State (6–2)	Fordham (7–1)	Youngstown State (7–2)	Southeastern Louisiana (7–3)	Southeastern Louisiana (8–3)	Northern Iowa (8–4)	Northern Iowa (9–5)	10.
11.	Fordham	Fordham (1–0)	South Dakota State (1–1)	Northern Iowa (0–2)	Southeastern Louisiana (2–2)	Southeastern Louisiana (3–2)	Montana State (4–2)	McNeese State (3–2)	McNeese State (4–2)	Youngstown State (6–2)	Montana (6–3)	Northern Iowa (6–4)	Northern Iowa (7–4)	Southeastern Louisiana (9–3)	Fordham (11–3)	11.
12.	Villanova	South Dakota State (0–1)	Furman (2–0)	Bethune-Cookman (2–0)	William & Mary (3–1)	William & Mary (4–1)	Southern Illinois (5–1)	Fordham (6–1)	Fordham (6–1)	Montana (5–3)	Illinois State (7–1)	Montana State (7–3)	Montana State (8–3)	Montana (8–4)	South Dakota State (9–5)	12.
13.	Towson	Chattanooga (0–1)	Bethune-Cookman (1–0)	William & Mary (2–1)	Montana State (2–2)	Montana State (3–2)	Chattanooga (3–2)	Eastern Kentucky (6–0)	South Dakota State (5–2)	Richmond (6–2)	Chattanooga (6–3)	McNeese State (6–3)	Montana (7–4)	Harvard (10–0)	Montana (9–5)	13.
14.	Chattanooga	Tennessee State (1–0)	Chattanooga (0–2)	Montana State (2–1)	Chattanooga (1–2)	Chattanooga (2–2)	Fordham (5–1)	Southern Illinois (5–2)	Bethune-Cookman (6–1)	Chattanooga (5–3)	Southeastern Louisiana (6–3)	Richmond (7–3)	Eastern Kentucky (9–2)	South Dakota State (8–4)	Southeastern Louisiana (9–4)	14.
15.	Tennessee State	Sam Houston State (1–1)	Sam Houston State (1–2)	Chattanooga (1–2)	Bethune-Cookman (2–1)	Southern Illinois (4–1)	Illinois State (4–0)	William & Mary (4–2)	Chattanooga (4–3)	Southeastern Louisiana (6–3)	Montana State (6–3)	Youngstown State (7–3)	Harvard (9–0)	James Madison (9–3)	Harvard (10–0)	15.
16.	Eastern Illinois	Eastern Illinois (0–1)	William & Mary (1–1)	Southern Illinois (3–0)	Fordham (3–1)	Fordham (5–1)	Youngstown State (4–1)	Bethune-Cookman (5–1)	Richmond (5–2)	Eastern Kentucky (7–1)	Eastern Kentucky (8–1)	Montana (6–4)	South Dakota State (7–4)	Eastern Kentucky (9–3)	Richmond (9–5)	16.
17.	Sam Houston State	Richmond (1–0)	Montana State (1–1)	Richmond (2–1)	Southern Illinois (3–1)	Bethune-Cookman (3–1)	Eastern Kentucky (5–0)	Chattanooga (3–3)	Youngstown State (5–2)	William & Mary (5–3)	Indiana State (6–3)	Harvard (8–0)	James Madison (8–3)	Montana State (8–4)	Liberty (9–5)	17.
18.	Montana State	Bethune–Cookman (1–0)	Richmond (1–1)	Fordham (2–1)	Youngstown State (3–1)	Youngstown State (3–1)	Bethune-Cookman (4–1)	South Dakota State (4–2)	William & Mary (4–3)	South Dakota State (5–3)	Harvard (7–0)	Eastern Kentucky (8–2)	Indiana State (7–4)	Richmond (8–4)	James Madison (9–4)	18.
19.	William & Mary	Furman (1–0)	Fordham (1–1)	Youngstown State (2–1)	Eastern Kentucky (4–0)	Eastern Kentucky (4–0)	South Dakota State (3–2)	Richmond (4–2)	Eastern Kentucky (6–1)	Indiana State (5–3)	Northern Iowa (5–4)	South Dakota State (6–4)	McNeese State (6–4)	Sam Houston State (8–4)	Indiana State (8–6)	19.
20.	Richmond	Montana State (0–1)	Southern Illinois (2–0)	Tennessee State (2–1)	Richmond (2–2)	Richmond (2–2)	Indiana State (4–1)	Northern Iowa (3–3)	Southern Illinois (5–3)	Harvard (6–0)	Bethune-Cookman (7–2)	Bethune-Cookman (8–3)	Youngstown State (7–4)	Liberty (8–4)	Montana State (8–5)	20.
21.	Furman	William & Mary (0–1)	Youngstown State (1–1)	Furman (2–1)	Tennessee State (3–1)	Tennessee State (4–1)	Northern Iowa (2–3)	Youngstown State (4–2)	Harvard (5–0)	Bethune-Cookman (6–2)	Cal Poly (6–3)	Bryant (8–1)	Richmond (7–4)	Youngstown State (7–5)	Eastern Kentucky (9–4)	21.
22.	Bethune-Cookman	Towson (0–1)	Tennessee State (1–1)	Northern Arizona (2–1)	Liberty (3–1)	Illinois State (3–0)	Richmond (3–2)	Indiana State (4–2)	Indiana State (4–3)	Northern Iowa (4–4)	South Dakota State (5–4)	Northern Arizona (7–3)	William & Mary (7–4)	Bethune-Cookman (9–3)	Youngstown State (7–5)	22.
23.	Northern Arizona	Youngstown State (0–1)	Maine (1–0)	Eastern Kentucky (3–0)	Illinois State (2–0)	Albany (4–0)	Southeast Missouri State (4–2)	Charleston Southern (5–1)	Northern Iowa (3–4)	Albany (6–2)	Bryant (7–1)	Indiana State (6–4)	Sam Houston State (7–4)	William & Mary (7–5)	Bethune-Cookman (9–3)	23.
24.	Youngstown State	Maine (1–0)	Northern Arizona (1–1)	Liberty (2–1)	Albany (3–0)	Delaware (3–1)	Charleston Southern (5–0)	Sam Houston State (3–3)	Sacred Heart (6–1)	Stephen F. Austin (6–2)	William & Mary (5–4)	William & Mary (6–4)	North Carolina A&T (9–2)	Idaho State (8–4)	Sacred Heart (9–3)	24.
25.	Maine	Northern Arizona (0–1)	Eastern Illinois (0–2)	Sam Houston State (1–3)	Delaware (2–1)	Indiana State (3–1)	Tennessee State (4–2)	Harvard (4–0)	Albany (5–2)	Bryant (6–1)	Northern Arizona (6–3)	James Madison (7–3)	Bethune-Cookman (8–3)	Indiana State (7–5)	Idaho State (8–4)	25.
	Preseason Aug 21	Week 1 Sep 1	Week 2 Sep 8	Week 3 Sep 15	Week 4 Sep 22	Week 5 Sep 29	Week 6 Oct 6	Week 7 Oct 13	Week 8 Oct 20	Week 9 Oct 27	Week 10 Nov 3	Week 11 Nov 10	Week 12 Nov 17	Week 13 Nov 23	Week 14 (Final) Jan 12	
		None	Dropped: 22 Towson (0–2)	Dropped: 23 Maine (1–1); 25 Eastern Illinois (0–3)	Dropped: 21 Furman; 22 Northern Arizona; 25 Sam Houston State	Dropped: 23 Illinois State	Dropped: 23 Albany; 24 Delaware	Dropped: 23 Southeast Missouri State; 25 Tennessee State	Dropped: 23 Charleston Southern; 24 Sam Houston State	Dropped: 20 Southern Illinois; 24 Sacred Heart	Dropped: 23 Albany; 24 Stephen F. Austin	Dropped: 21 Cal Poly	Dropped: 21 Bryant (8–2); 22 Northern Arizona (7–4)	Dropped: 19 McNeese State (6–5); 24 North Carolina A&T (9–3)	Dropped: 23 William & Mary	

== Coaches' Poll ==
	Preseason Aug 4	Week 1 Sep 1	Week 2 Sep 8	Week 3 Sep 15	Week 4 Sep 22	Week 5 Sep 29	Week 6 Oct 6	Week 7 Oct 13	Week 8 Oct 20	Week 9 Oct 27	Week 10 Nov 3	Week 11 Nov 10	Week 12 Nov 17	Week 13 Nov 24	Week 14 (Final) Jan 12	
1.	North Dakota State (18)	North Dakota State (24) (1–0)	North Dakota State (25) (2–0)	North Dakota State (25) (3–0)	North Dakota State (26) (4–0)	North Dakota State (26) (4–0)	North Dakota State (5–0)	North Dakota State (26) (6–0)	North Dakota State (26) (7–0)	North Dakota State (26) (8–0)	North Dakota State (26) (9–0)	Coastal Carolina (20) (10–0)			North Dakota State	1.
2.	Eastern Washington (6)	Eastern Washington (2) (2–0)	Eastern Washington (2–1)	Eastern Washington (1) (2–1)	Eastern Washington (3–1)	Eastern Washington (4–1)	Eastern Washington (5–1)	Eastern Washington (6–1)	Eastern Washington (7–1)	Coastal Carolina (8–0)	Coastal Carolina (9–0)	New Hampshire (4) (8–1)			Illinois State	2.
3.	Southeastern Louisiana (1)	Southeastern Louisiana (1–0)	Southeastern Louisiana (1) (2–0)	Montana (2–1)	Coastal Carolina (4–0)	Coastal Carolina (5–0)	Coastal Carolina (6–0)	Coastal Carolina (7–0)	Coastal Carolina (7–0)	Villanova (7-1)	New Hampshire (7–1)	Jacksonville State (2) (8–1)			New Hampshire	3.
4.	New Hampshire	Coastal Carolina (1–0)	Montana (1–1)	Southeastern Louisiana (2–1)	McNeese State (1–1)	McNeese State (2–1)	McNeese State (3–1)	Villanova (5–1)	Villanova (6–1)	New Hampshire (6–1)	Jacksonville State (7–1)	North Dakota State (9–1)			Eastern Washington	4.
5.	Montana	Montana (0–1)	Coastal Carolina (2–0)	Coastal Carolina (3–0)	Villanova (2–1)	Villanova (3–1)	Villanova (4–1)	New Hampshire (5–1)	New Hampshire (5–1)	Jacksonville State (6–1)	Eastern Washington (8–2)	Eastern Washington (9–2)			Coastal Carolina	5.
6.	Coastal Carolina	McNeese State (0–0)	McNeese State (0–1)	McNeese State (1–1)	Montana (2–2)	New Hampshire (3–1)	New Hampshire (4–1)	Montana (4–2)	Montana (5–2)	Illinois State (7–0)	McNeese State (6–2)	Villanova (8–2)			Sam Houston State	6.
7.	Towson (1)	Villanova (0–1)	Villanova (1–1)	Villanova (1–1)	New Hampshire (2–1)	Montana (3–2)	Montana (4–2)	Jacksonville State (5–1)	Jacksonville (5–1)	Eastern Washington (7–2)	Villanova (7–2)	Illinois State (8–1)			Villanova	7.
8.	Jacksonville State	New Hampshire (0–1)	Jacksonville State (1–1)	Jacksonville State (1–1)	Jacksonville State (2–1)	Jacksonville State (3–1)	Jacksonville State (4–1)	Southeastern Louisiana (5–2)	Southeastern Louisiana (6–2)	McNeese State (5–2)	Richmond (7–2)	Fordham (9–1)			Chattanooga	8.
9.	McNeese State	Jacksonville State (0–1)	New Hampshire (0–1)	New Hampshire (1–1)	South Dakota State (3–1)	South Dakota State (3–1)	Southeastern Louisiana (4–2)	Illinois State (5–0)	Illinois State (6–0)	Montana State (6–2)	Fordham (8–1)	Chattanooga (7–3)			Montana	9.
10.	South Dakota State	Fordham (1–0)	South Dakota State (1–1)	South Dakota State (2–1)	Northern Iowa (1–2)	Northern Iowa (2–2)	Youngstown State (4–1)	McNeese State (3–2)	McNeese State (4–2)	Fordham (7–1)	Montana (6–3)	Southeastern Louisiana (7–3)			Northern Iowa	10.
11.	Eastern Illinois	South Dakota State (0–1)	Northern Iowa (0–1)	Northern Iowa (0–2)	Southeastern Louisiana (2–2)	Southeastern Louisiana (3–2)	William & Mary (4–1)	Montana State (5–2)	Montana State (6–2)	Montana (5–3)	Chattanooga (6–3)	McNeese State (6–3)			Montana	11.
12.	Fordham	Northern Iowa (0–1)	Furman (2–0)	Bethune-Cookman (2–0)	Youngstown State (3–1)	Youngstown State (3–1)	Chattanooga (3–2)	Eastern Kentucky (6–0)	Fordham (6–1)	Chattanooga (5–3)	Illinois State (7–1)	Northern Iowa (6–4)			Southeastern Louisiana	12.
13.	Villanova	Sam Houston State (1–1)	Bethune-Cookman (1–0)	Southern Illinois (3–0)	William & Mary (3–1)	William & Mary (4–1)	Southern Illinois (5–1)	Fordham (6–1)	Bethune-Cookman (6–1)	Youngstown State (6–2)	Youngstown State (7–2)	Montana State (7–3)			South Dakota State	13.
14.	Sam Houston State	Eastern Illinois (0–1)	Southern Illinois (2–0)	Chattanooga (1–2)	Bethune-Cookman (2–1)	Chattanooga (2–2)	Montana State (4–2)	Bethune-Cookman (5–1)	Chattanooga (4–3)	Richmond (6–2)	Southeastern Louisiana (6–3)	Richmond (7–3)			Fordham	14.
15.	Northern Iowa	Chattanooga (0–1)	Sam Houston State (1–2)	Youngstown State (2–1)	Chattanooga (1–2)	Montana State (3–2)	Illinois State (4–0)	Chattanooga (3–3)	South Dakota State (5–2)	Southeastern Louisiana (6–3)	Eastern Kentucky (8–1)	Montana (6–4)			Harvard	15.
16.	Chattanooga	Tennessee State (1–0)	Youngstown State (1–1)	Montana State (2–1)	Southern Illinois (3–1)	Southern Illinois (4–1)	Eastern Kentucky (5–0)	South Dakota State (4–2)	Youngstown State (5–2)	Eastern Kentucky (7–1)	Montana State (6–3)	Youngstown State (7–3)			Richmond	16.
17.	Tennessee State	Furman (1–0)	Chattanooga (0–2)	William & Mary (2–1)	Montana State (2–2)	Bethune-Cookman (3–1)	Bethune-Cookman (4–1)	Southern Illinois (5–2)	RIchmond (5–2)	William & Mary (5–3)	Harvard (7–0)	Harvard (8–0)			Liberty	17.
18.	Furman	Bethune-Cookman (1–0)	Montana State (1–1)	Richmond (2–1)	Eastern Kentucky (4–0)	Eastern Kentucky (4–0)	Fordham (5–1)	William & Mary (4–2)	Eastern Kentucky (6–1)	Harvard (6–0)	Bethune-Cookman (7–2)	Bethune-Cookman (8–2)			Indiana State	18.
19.	Montana State	Towson (0–1)	William & Mary (1–1)	Fordham (2–1)	Fordham (3–1)	Fordham (5–1)	South Dakota State (3–2)	Youngstown State (4–2)	Southern Illinois (5–3)	South Dakota State (5–3)	Indiana State (6–3)	South Dakota State (6–4)			James Madison	19.
20.	Maine	Richmond (1–0)	Maine (1–0)	Tennessee State (2–1)	Tennessee State (3–1)	Tennessee State (4–1)	Richmond (3–2)	Richmond (4–2)	William & Mary (4–3)	Bethune-Cookman (6–2)	Northern Iowa (5–4)	Eastern Kentucky (8–2)			Montana State	20.
21.	Youngstown State	Youngstown State (0–1)	Richmond (1–1)	Furman (2–1)	Richmond (2–2)	Richmond (2–2)	Northern Iowa (2–3)	Northern Iowa (3–3)	Harvard (5–0)	Indiana State (5–3)	Bryant (7–1)	Bryant (8–1)			Eastern Kentucky	21.
22.	William & Mary	Maine (1–0)	Tennessee State (1–1)	Eastern Kentucky (3–0)	Illinois State (2–0)	Illinois State (3–0)	Indiana State (4–1)	Charleston Southern (5–1)	Sacred Heart (6–1)	Northern Iowa (4–4)	South Dakota State (5–4)	Southern Illinois (6–4)			Bethune-Cookman	22.
23.	Bethune-Cookman	Montana State (0–1)	Fordham (1–1)	Northern Arizona (2–1)	Liberty (3–1)	Missouri State (3–1)	Charleston Southern (5–0)	Indiana State (4–2)	Northern Iowa (3–4)	Stephen F. Austin (6–2)	Cal Poly (6–3)	William & Mary			Sacred Heart	23.
24.	Richmond	William & Mary (0–1)	Eastern Illinois (0–2)	Illinois State (2–0)	Missouri State (3–1)	Charleston Southern (5–0)	Alcorn State (5–1)	Harvard (4–0)	Indiana State (4–3)	Bryant (6–1)	Southern Illinois (5–4)	Stephen F. Austin (7–3)			William & Mary	24.
25.	Northern Arizona	Southern Illinois (1–0)	Eastern Kentucky (2–0)	Bryant (3–0); Sam Houston State (1–3)	Charleston Southern (4–0)	Northern Arizona (3–2)	Tennessee State (4–2)	Sam Houston State (3–3)	Bryant (5–1)	Southern Illinois (5–4)	William & Mary (5–4)	Indiana State (6–4)			Youngstown State	25.
	Preseason Aug 4	Week 1 Sep 1	Week 2 Sep 8	Week 3 Sep 15	Week 4 Sep 22	Week 5 Sep 29	Week 6 Oct 6	Week 7 Oct 13	Week 8 Oct 20	Week 9 Oct 27	Week 10 Nov 3	Week 11 Nov 10	Week 12 Nov 17	Week 13 Nov 24	Week 14 (Final) Jan 12	
		Dropped: 25 Northern Arizona (1–0)	Dropped: 19 Towson (0–2)	Dropped: 20 Maine; 24 Eastern Illinois	Dropped: 21 Furman; 23 Northern Arizona; 25 Sam Houston State; 25 Bryant	Dropped: 23 Liberty	Dropped: 23 Missouri State; 25 Northern Arizona	Dropped: 24 Alcorn State; 25 Tennessee State	Dropped: 22 Charleston Southern; 25 Sam Houston State	Dropped: 22 Sacred Heart	Dropped: 23 Stephen F. Austin	Dropped: 23 Cal Poly	None	None	None	
