= Roy Kidd Stadium =

Stadium in Kentucky, United States

Coordinates: 37.73439°N 84.29741°W

CG Bank Field at Roy Kidd Stadium
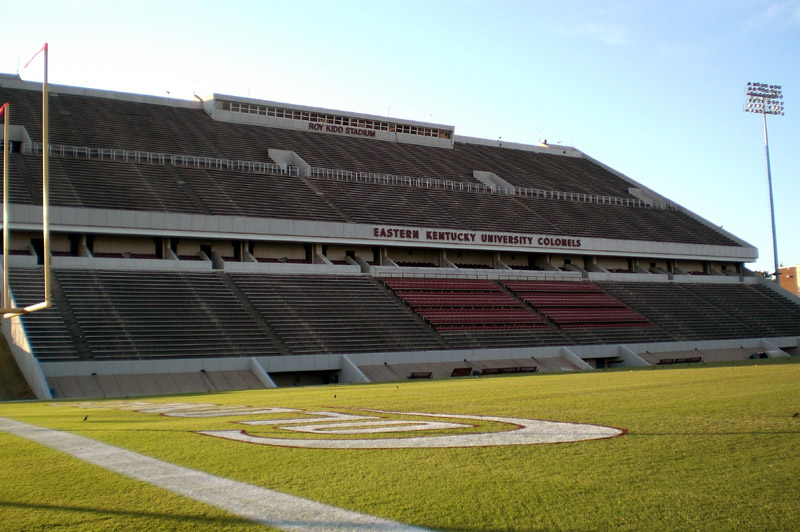
- Interactive map of CG Bank Field at Roy Kidd Stadium
- Former names: Hanger Field
- Location: Roy and Sue Kidd Way Richmond, Kentucky 40475
- Owner: Eastern Kentucky University
- Operator: Eastern Kentucky University
- Capacity: 20,000
- Surface: SF II Synthetic Turf

Construction
- Opened: 1969
- Cost: $5,461,439 ($47.9 million in 2025 dollars)
- Architects: Hartshern, Schnell, Campbell, Schadt, Associates

Tenant
- Eastern Kentucky Colonels (NCAA) (1969–present)

CG Bank Field at Roy Kidd Stadium is Eastern Kentucky University's football stadium in Richmond, Kentucky. The stadium is home to the EKU Colonels football team, located on campus. Currently, CG Bank Field at Roy Kidd Stadium consists of upper and lower-level seating areas, with a predominant majority of the seats being metal bleachers. Reserved chairback seats can be found in the middle of the lower level, as well, the seats are generally purchased by season ticket holders and Eastern Alumni.

The Colonels football team has found success playing at CG Bank Field at Roy Kidd Stadium, possessing a 191-43-1 home record.

== History ==
The stadium was originally named Hanger Field, just like its predecessor, but was renamed in 1990 for longtime head football coach Roy Kidd, who won 314 games during his tenure at the Eastern Kentucky and led his teams to two NCAA Division I-AA Championships, in 1979 and 1982. In the 2004 season, 22,700 people ventured to the stadium to watch Eastern Kentucky battle its rival Western Kentucky, making it the fifth largest crowd in the stadium's history. In 2022 the field was renamed CG Bank Field.

=== Renovations ===
On April 8, 2009, it was announced that the original natural turf was being replaced by SF II synthetic turf for the upcoming 2009 football season. The home locker rooms, along with new play-clocks and scoreboard, were also included in the minor renovation for that season.

== Features ==
A majority of the football operations, along with a state-of-the-art strength & conditioning and athletic training facilities are located next door in the Moberly Building. The stadium's architecture allows for Roy Kidd Stadium to serve as the "roof" of an academic building known as the Begley Building. Inside there are: three gymnasiums, two handball courts, 36 classrooms, 60 offices, as well as the locker and training rooms for the football team.

== Record attendance ==
Attendance	Opponent	Date	Score
25,300	Western Kentucky	Oct. 20, 1979	W 8–6
25,000	Western Kentucky	Oct. 22, 1977	W 35–10
24,500	Western Kentucky	Oct, 23, 1971	L 16–7
24,200	Western Kentucky	Oct. 25, 1975	W 13–7
22,700	Western Kentucky	Sep. 18, 2004	L 21–8
22,500	Murray State	Oct. 31, 1970	W 17–7
22,400	Marshall	Sep. 19, 1987	W 37–34
21,700	Delaware State	Sep. 10, 1988	W 48–7
21,200	Murray State	Nov. 1, 1980	W 24–14
20,800	Western Kentucky	Oct. 24, 1981	W 19–11

== Images ==
Roy Kidd Stadium

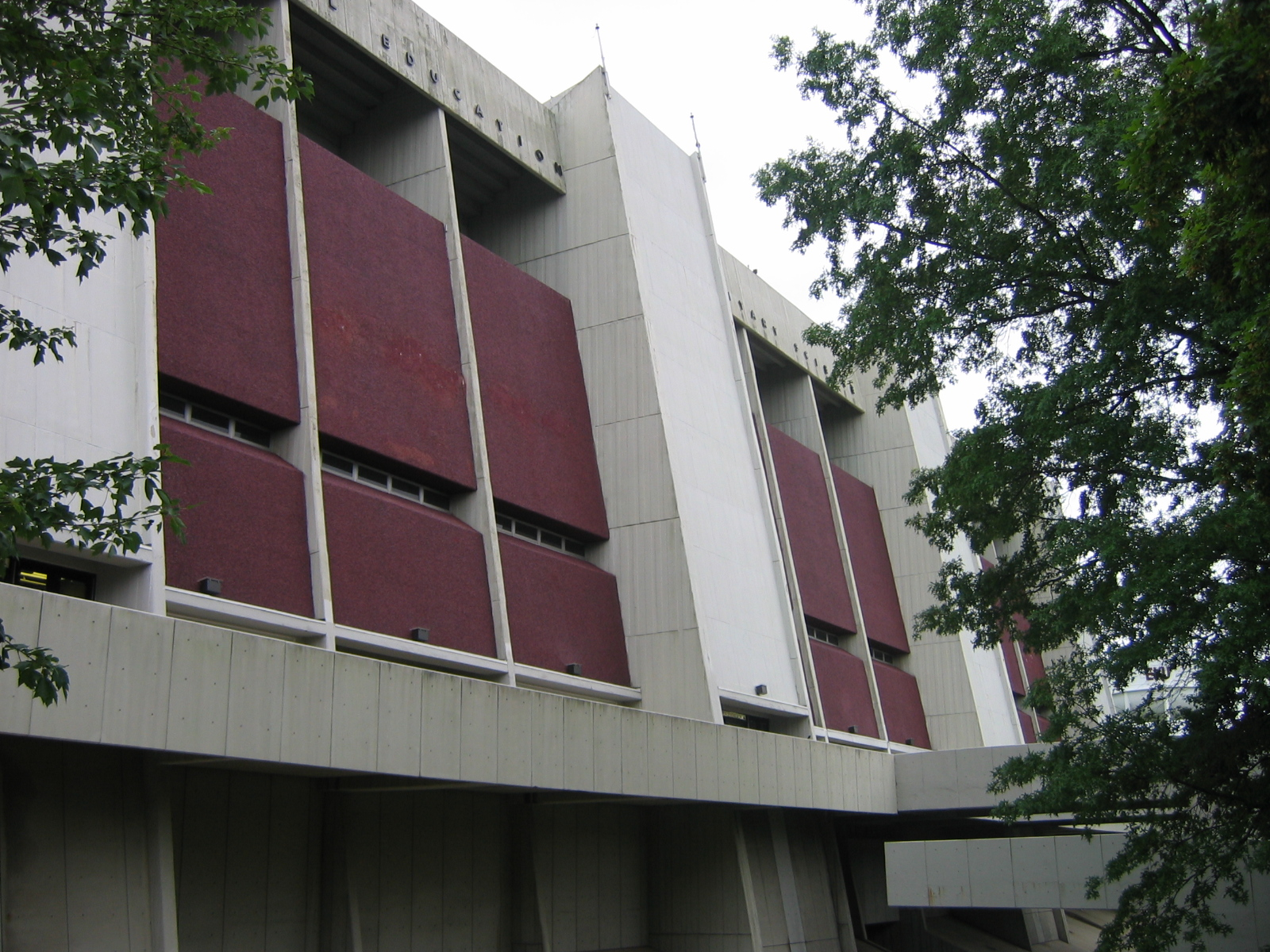
Exterior, 2008

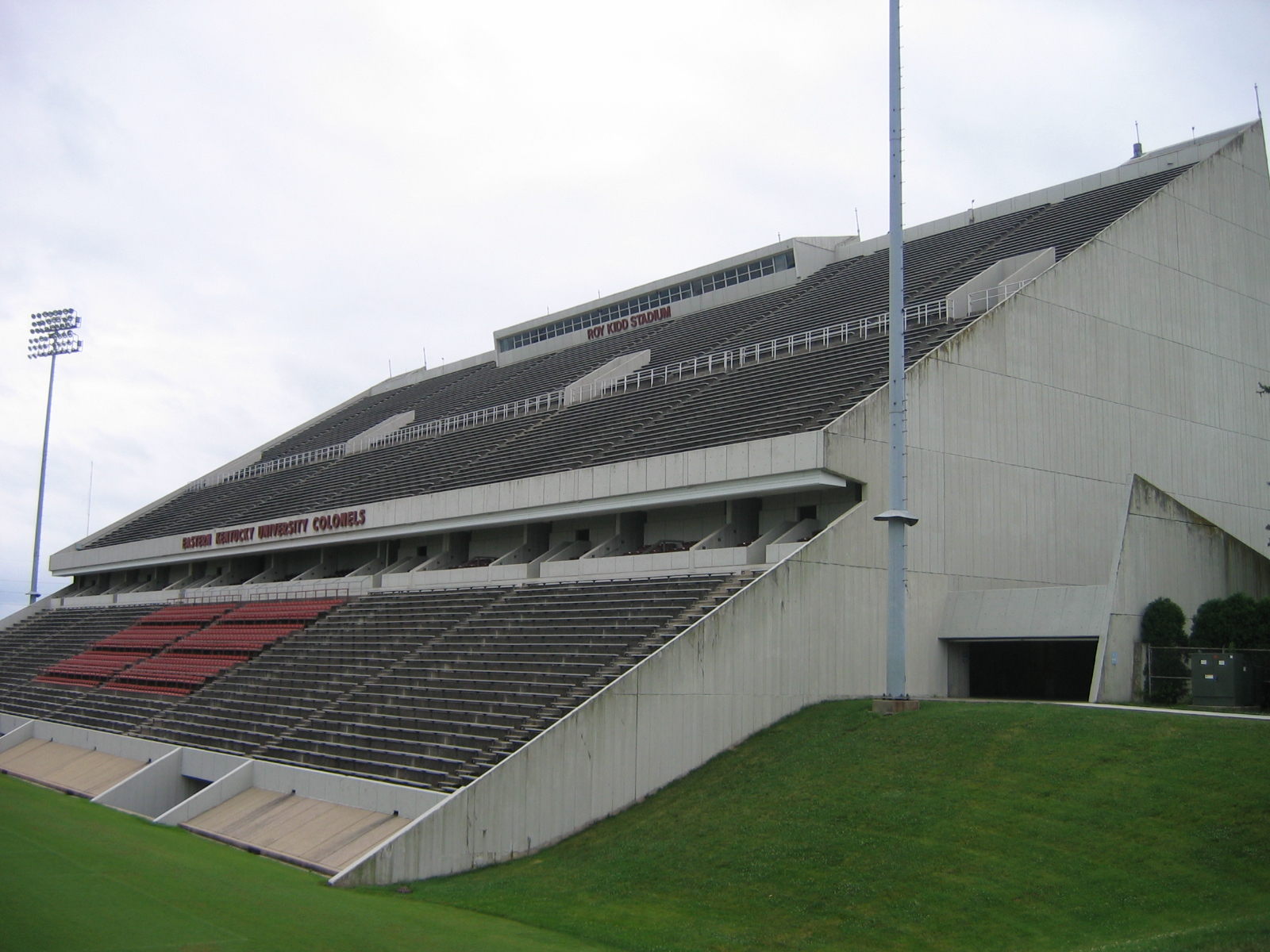
Home stands, 2008.

== See also ==
- List of NCAA Division I FCS football stadiums
