= 2014 Sam Houston State Bearkats football team =

American college football season

2014 Sam Houston State Bearkats football

Southland co-champion

FCS Playoffs Semifinals, L 3–35 vs. North Dakota State
- Conference: Southland Conference

Ranking
- Sports Network: No. 6
- FCS Coaches: No. 6
- Record: 11–5 (7–1 Southland)
- Head coach: K. C. Keeler (1st season)
- Offensive coordinator: Phil Longo (1st season)
- Offensive scheme: Air raid
- Defensive coordinator: Mike Collins (2nd season)
- Co-defensive coordinator: Brad Sherrod (1st season)
- Base defense: 3–4
- Home stadium: Bowers Stadium

2014 Southland Conference football standings
	Conf.			Overall
Team	W		L	W		L
No. 6 Sam Houston St +^	7	–	1	11	–	5
No. 14 SE Louisiana +^	7	–	1	9	–	4
Lamar	5	–	3	8	–	4
Stephen F. Austin ^	5	–	3	8	–	5
Central Arkansas	5	–	3	6	–	6
McNeese State	4	–	4	6	–	5
Abilene Christian *	4	–	4	6	–	6
Northwestern State	4	–	4	6	–	6
Incarnate Word *	2	–	6	2	–	9
Houston Baptist	1	–	7	2	–	9
Nicholls State	0	–	8	0	–	12
+ – Conference co-champions; ^ – FCS playoff participant; * – ineligible for FCS playoffs due to transition from NCAA Division II; Rankings from The Sports Network poll

The 2014 Sam Houston State Bearkats football team represented Sam Houston State University in the 2014 NCAA Division I FCS football season. The Bearkats were led by first-year head coach K. C. Keeler and played their home games at Bowers Stadium. They are a member of the Southland Conference. They finished the season 11–5, 7–1 in Southland play to finish in a share of the Southland Conference title. They received the Southland's automatic bid to the FCS Playoffs where they defeated Southeastern Louisiana, Jacksonville State, and Villanova to advance to the Semifinals where they lost to North Dakota State. But, along the way they lost to eventual D-2 Champion CSU-Pueblo.

== Schedule ==
Date	Time	Opponent	Rank	Site	TV	Result	Attendance	Source
August 23	2:30 pm	at No. 1 Eastern Washington*	No. 17	Roos Field; Cheney, WA (FCS Kickoff)	ESPN	L 35–56	10,310	
August 30	6:30 pm	Alabama State*	No. 17	Bowers Stadium; Huntsville, TX		W 51–20	7,595	
September 6	6:30 pm	at No. 12 (FBS) LSU*	No. 15	Tiger Stadium; Baton Rouge, LA	SECN	L 0–56	100,338	
September 13	6:30 pm	No. 2 (D-II) CSU–Pueblo*	No. 15	Bowers Stadium; Huntsville, TX	BSN	L 21–47	9,678	
September 27	7:00 pm	at Lamar		Provost Umphrey Stadium; Beaumont, TX		W 42–10	9,308	
October 11	3:00 pm	No. 5 McNeese State^{†}		Bowers Stadium; Huntsville, TX	SLCTV	W 38–22	8,418	
October 18	3:00 pm	at Northwestern State	No. 24	Harry Turpin Stadium; Natchitoches, LA	SLCTV	L 27–31	7,895	
October 25	3:00 pm	Abilene Christian		Bowers Stadium; Huntsville, TX	BSN	W 38–21	7,073	
November 1	3:00 pm	vs. No. 24 Stephen F. Austin		Reliant Stadium; Houston, TX (Battle of the Piney Woods)	SLCTV	W 42–28	26,788	
November 8	6:00 pm	at Incarnate Word		Gayle and Tom Benson Stadium; San Antonio, TX		W 40–19	3,476	
November 15	3:00 pm	at Houston Baptist		Husky Stadium; Houston, TX	FSSW	W 76–0	3,124	
November 22	12:30 pm	Central Arkansas	No. 23	Bowers Stadium; Huntsville, TX	SLCTV	W 38–31	5,717	
November 29	1:00 pm	No. 11 Southeastern Louisiana*	No. 19	Bowers Stadium; Huntsville, TX (NCAA Division I First Round)	ESPN3	W 21–17	4,758	
December 6	1:00 pm	at No. 3 Jacksonville State*	No. 19	JSU Stadium; Jacksonville, AL (NCAA Division I Second Round)	ESPN3	W 37–26	10,832	
December 13	12:00 pm	at No. 5 Villanova*	No. 19	Villanova Stadium; Villanova, PA (NCAA Division I Quarterfinal)	ESPN3	W 34–31	2,333	
December 19	7:00 pm	at No. 2 North Dakota State*	No. 19	Fargodome; Fargo, ND (NCAA Division I Semifinal)	ESPN2	L 3–35	18,025	
*Non-conference game; ^{†}Homecoming; Rankings from The Sports Network Poll released prior to the game; All times are in Central time

== Game summaries ==
=== At No. 1 Eastern Washington ===
No. 17 Sam Houston State at No. 1 Eastern Washington

Team	1	2	3	4	Total
No. 17 Bearkats	0	21	0	14	35
• No. 1 Eagles	7	14	7	28	56

- Date: August 23
- Location: Roos Field
  Cheney, WA
- Game start: 12:35 PM PST
- Elapsed time: 3:57
- Game attendance: 10,310
- Game weather: 72 °F (22 °C), Sunny, winds NE at 8mph
- Referee: Gregg Wilson
- TV announcers (ESPN): Mark Jones, Rod Gilmore, Colin Cowherd, & Jessica Mendoza

Scoring summary
1	6:35	EWU	Blair Bomber 3-yard touchdown reception from Vernon Adams, Roldan Alcobendas kick good	EWU 7–0
2	14:51	SHSU	Keshawn Hill 79-yard touchdown run, Luc Swimberghe kick good	Tied 7–7
2	14:34	SHSU	Interception returned 55 yards for touchdown by Trenier Orr, Swimberghe kick good	SHSU 14–7
2	12:04	EWU	Kendrick Bourne 13-yard touchdown reception from Adams, Alcobendas kick good	Tied 14–14
2	10:53	SHSU	Jared Johnson 53-yard touchdown run, Swimberghe kick good	SHSU 21–14
2	6:33	EWU	Jalen Moore 34-yard touchdown run, Alcobendas kick good	Tied 21–21
3	9:28	EWU	Bomber 3-yard touchdown reception from Adams, Alcobendas kick good	EWU 28–21
4	14:50	EWU	Zach Wimberly 1-yard touchdown run, Alcobendas kick good	EWU 35–21
4	12:21	SHSU	Derreck Edwards 6-yard touchdown reception from Johnson, Swimberghe kick good	EWU 35–28
4	8:44	EWU	Cooper Kupp 5-yard touchdown reception from Jordan West, Alcobendas kick good	EWU 42–28
4	5:14	SHSU	Shane Young 1-yard touchdown reception from Johnson, Swimberghe kick good	EWU 42–35
4	3:13	EWU	Bourne 13-yard touchdown reception from Adams, Alcobendas kick good	EWU 49–35
4	0:31	EWU	Moore 1-yard touchdown run, Alcobendas kick good	EWU 56–35

Statistics	SHSU	EWU
First downs	23	37
Total yards	542	624
Rushing yards	225	317
Passing yards	317	307
Turnovers	2	1
Time of possession	24:12	35:48

Team	Category	Player	Statistics
Sam Houston State	Passing	Jared Johnson	31/53, 317 yards, 2 TD, 2 INT
Sam Houston State	Rushing	Keshawn Hill	17 rushes, 133 yards, TD
Sam Houston State	Receiving	Yedidiah Louis	10 receptions, 89 yards
Eastern Washington	Passing	Vernon Adams	26/48, 302 yards, 4 TD, INT
Eastern Washington	Rushing	Quincy Forte	23 rushes, 152 yards
Eastern Washington	Receiving	Shaq Hill	4 receptions, 77 yards

=== Alabama State ===
Alabama State at No. 17 Sam Houston State

Team	1	2	3	4	Total
Hornets	7	3	10	0	20
• No. 17 Bearkats	14	24	10	3	51

- Date: August 30
- Location: Bowers Stadium
  Huntsville, TX
- Game attendance: 7,595

Statistics	ALST	SHSU
First downs	17	34
Total yards	402	685
Rushing yards	141	289
Passing yards	261	396
Turnovers	1	1
Time of possession	19:52	40:08

Team	Category	Player	Statistics
Alabama State	Passing	Daniel Duhart	17/32, 259 yards, 2 TD, INT
Alabama State	Rushing	Malcolm Cyrus	13 rushes, 83 yards
Alabama State	Receiving	DeMario Bell	4 receptions, 134 yards, TD
Sam Houston State	Passing	Jared Johnson	31/46, 386 yards, 3 TD
Sam Houston State	Rushing	Donavan Williams	12 rushes, 83 yards, TD
Sam Houston State	Receiving	Keshawn Hill	3 receptions, 126 yards, TD

=== At No. 12 (FBS) LSU ===
No. 15 Sam Houston State at No. 12 (FBS) LSU

Team	1	2	3	4	Total
No. 15 Bearkats	0	0	0	0	0
• No. 12 (FBS) Tigers	20	15	7	14	56

- Date: September 6
- Location: Tiger Stadium
  Baton Rouge, LA
- Game attendance: 100,338
- Television network: SECN

Statistics	SHSU	LSU
First downs	14	27
Total yards	206	584
Rushing yards	50	334
Passing yards	156	250
Turnovers	3	1
Time of possession	24:57	35:03

Team	Category	Player	Statistics
Sam Houston State	Passing	Jared Johnson	8/25, 142 yards, 2 INT
Sam Houston State	Rushing	Donavan Williams	9 rushes, 29 yards
Sam Houston State	Receiving	Yedidiah Louis	4 receptions, 102 yards
LSU	Passing	Anthony Jennings	7/13, 188 yards, 3 TD
LSU	Rushing	Leonard Fournette	13 rushes, 92 yards, TD
LSU	Receiving	Travin Dural	3 receptions, 140 yards, 3 TD

=== No. 2 (D-II) CSU Pueblo ===
No. 2 (D-II) CSU Pueblo at No. 15 Sam Houston State

Team	1	2	3	4	Total
• No. 2 (D-II) ThunderWolves	14	13	17	3	47
No. 15 Bearkats	0	0	7	14	21

- Date: September 13
- Location: Bowers Stadium
  Huntsville, TX
- Game start: 6:30 PM CST
- Game attendance: 9,678
- Television network: BSN

Statistics	CSUP	SHSU
First downs	20	17
Total yards	446	231
Rushing yards	187	85
Passing yards	259	146
Turnovers	0	2
Time of possession	36:54	23:06

Team	Category	Player	Statistics
CSU Pueblo	Passing	Chris Bonner	20/32, 255 yards, 3 TD
CSU Pueblo	Rushing	Cameron McDondle	14 rushes, 116 yards, 2 TD
CSU Pueblo	Receiving	Paul Browning	7 receptions, 98 yards, TD
Sam Houston State	Passing	Don King III	5/7, 74 yards, TD, INT
Sam Houston State	Rushing	Keshawn Hill	12 rushes, 55 yards, TD
Sam Houston State	Receiving	LaDarius Brown	3 receptions, 47 yards

=== At Lamar ===
Sam Houston State at Lamar

Team	1	2	3	4	Total
• Bearkats	13	6	7	16	42
Cardinals	0	3	7	0	10

- Date: September 27
- Location: Provost Umphrey Stadium
  Beaumont, TX
- Game start: 7:00 PM CST
- Game attendance: 9,308

Statistics	SHSU	LAM
First downs	23	18
Total yards	441	345
Rushing yards	268	101
Passing yards	173	244
Turnovers	0	4
Time of possession	29:48	30:12

Team	Category	Player	Statistics
Sam Houston State	Passing	Jared Johnson	18/34, 164 yards, TD
Sam Houston State	Rushing	Jalen Overstreet	9 rushes, 132 yards, TD
Sam Houston State	Receiving	Derreck Edwards	4 receptions, 52 yards
Lamar	Passing	Caleb Berry	21/36, 244 yards, TD, INT
Lamar	Rushing	Carl Harris	9 rushes, 76 yards
Lamar	Receiving	Devonn Brown	5 receptions, 88 yards

=== No. 5 McNeese State ===
No. 5 McNeese State at Sam Houston State

Team	1	2	3	4	Total
No. 5 Cowboys	0	7	0	15	22
• Bearkats	14	7	14	3	38

- Date: October 11
- Location: Bowers Stadium
  Huntsville, TX
- Game start: 3:00 PM CST
- Game attendance: 8,418
- Television network: SLCTV

Statistics	MCNS	SHSU
First downs	16	18
Total yards	298	486
Rushing yards	209	294
Passing yards	89	192
Turnovers	0	2
Time of possession	32:38	27:22

Team	Category	Player	Statistics
McNeese State	Passing	Daniel Sams	11/25, 84 yards, TD
McNeese State	Rushing	Daniel Sams	20 rushes, 130 yards, TD
McNeese State	Receiving	David Bush	2 receptions, 21 yards
Sam Houston State	Passing	Jared Johnson	15/29, 192 yards, 2 TD, INT
Sam Houston State	Rushing	Jared Johnson	11 rushes, 190 yards, 2 TD
Sam Houston State	Receiving	Yedidiah Louis	5 receptions, 65 yards, TD

=== At Northwestern State ===
No. 24 Sam Houston State at Northwestern State

Team	1	2	3	4	Total
No. 24 Bearkats	14	7	0	6	27
• Demons	7	14	0	10	31

- Date: October 18
- Location: Harry Turpin Stadium
  Natchitoches, LA
- Game start: 3:00 PM CST
- Game attendance: 7,895
- Television network: SLCTV

Statistics	SHSU	NWST
First downs	20	30
Total yards	432	482
Rushing yards	347	186
Passing yards	85	296
Turnovers	3	3
Time of possession	24:41	35:19

Team	Category	Player	Statistics
Sam Houston State	Passing	Jared Johnson	8/22, 85 yards, INT
Sam Houston State	Rushing	Keshawn Hill	17 rushes, 198 yards, 3 TD
Sam Houston State	Receiving	Yedidiah Louis	2 receptions, 25 yards
Northwestern State	Passing	Zach Adkins	22/35, 296 yards, 4 TD, 3 INT
Northwestern State	Rushing	Garrett Atzenweiler	18 rushes, 68 yards
Northwestern State	Receiving	Tuff McClain	5 receptions, 102 yards, TD

=== Abilene Christian ===
Abilene Christian at Sam Houston State

Team	1	2	3	4	Total
Wildcats	0	14	0	7	21
• Bearkats	7	17	7	7	38

- Date: October 25
- Location: Bowers Stadium
  Huntsville, TX
- Game start: 3:00 PM CST
- Game attendance: 7,073
- Television network: BSN

Statistics	ACU	SHSU
First downs	20	20
Total yards	445	452
Rushing yards	31	175
Passing yards	414	277
Turnovers	4	0
Time of possession	29:05	30:55

Team	Category	Player	Statistics
Abilene Christian	Passing	Parker McKenzie	29/44, 385 yards, 2 TD, INT
Abilene Christian	Rushing	De'Andre Brown	9 rushes, 20 yards, TD
Abilene Christian	Receiving	Cedric Gilbert	8 receptions, 98 yards
Sam Houston State	Passing	Jared Johnson	26/34, 277 yards, TD
Sam Houston State	Rushing	Jared Johnson	15 rushes, 86 yards
Sam Houston State	Receiving	Yedidiah Louis	8 receptions, 82 yards

=== Vs. No. 24 Stephen F. Austin ===
No. 24 Stephen F. Austin vs. Sam Houston State (Battle of the Piney Woods)

Team	1	2	3	4	Total
No. 24 Lumberjacks	7	7	7	7	28
• Bearkats	7	14	14	7	42

- Date: November 1
- Location: Reliant Stadium
  Houston, TX
- Game start: 3:00 PM CST
- Game attendance: 26,788
- Television network: SLCTV

Statistics	SFA	SHSU
First downs	28	17
Total yards	516	486
Rushing yards	250	357
Passing yards	266	129
Turnovers	2	2
Time of possession	41:26	18:34

Team	Category	Player	Statistics
Stephen F. Austin	Passing	Zach Conque	34/51, 266 yards, INT
Stephen F. Austin	Rushing	Gus Johnson	24 rushes, 148 yards, TD
Stephen F. Austin	Receiving	D. J. Ward	12 receptions, 80 yards
Sam Houston State	Passing	Jared Johnson	6/17, 129 yards
Sam Houston State	Rushing	Keshawn Hill	14 rushes, 154 yards, 4 TD
Sam Houston State	Receiving	Yedidiah Louis	1 reception, 44 yards

=== At Incarnate Word ===
Sam Houston State at Incarnate Word

Team	1	2	3	4	Total
• Bearkats	23	7	3	7	40
Cardinals	0	16	0	3	19

- Date: November 8
- Location: Gayle and Tom Benson Stadium
  San Antonio, TX
- Game start: 6:00 PM CST
- Game attendance: 3,476

Statistics	SHSU	UIW
First downs	24	18
Total yards	377	271
Rushing yards	189	58
Passing yards	188	213
Turnovers	3	1
Time of possession	31:34	28:26

Team	Category	Player	Statistics
Sam Houston State	Passing	Jared Johnson	13/20, 188 yards, 3 TD, INT
Sam Houston State	Rushing	Keshawn Hill	15 rushes, 79 yards, 2 TD
Sam Houston State	Receiving	Yedidiah Louis	3 receptions, 59 yards
Incarnate Word	Passing	Jordon Scelfo	21/38, 213 yards, 2 TD, INT
Incarnate Word	Rushing	Junior Sessions	15 rushes, 52 yards
Incarnate Word	Receiving	Jordan Hicks	5 receptions, 59 yards

=== At Houston Baptist ===
Sam Houston State at Houston Baptist

Team	1	2	3	4	Total
• Bearkats	35	20	7	14	76
Huskies	0	0	0	0	0

- Date: November 15
- Location: Husky Stadium
  Houston, TX
- Game start: 3:00 PM CST
- Game attendance: 3,124
- Television network: SLCTV

Statistics	SHSU	HBU
First downs	34	10
Total yards	823	177
Rushing yards	601	135
Passing yards	222	42
Turnovers	0	2
Time of possession	30:01	29:59

Team	Category	Player	Statistics
Sam Houston State	Passing	Don King III	8/12, 121 yards
Sam Houston State	Rushing	Donavan Williams	13 rushes, 212 yards, 3 TD
Sam Houston State	Receiving	Grant Finney	2 receptions, 48 yards
Houston Baptist	Passing	Ka'Darius Baker	7/22, 42 yards, 2 INT
Houston Baptist	Rushing	B. J. Kelly	12 rushes, 70 yards
Houston Baptist	Receiving	Darian Lazard	3 receptions, 17 yards

=== Central Arkansas ===
Central Arkansas at No. 23 Sam Houston State

Team	1	2	3	4	Total
Bears	7	14	0	10	31
• No. 23 Bearkats	14	10	14	0	38

- Date: November 22
- Location: Bowers Stadium
  Huntsville, TX
- Game start: 12:30 PM CST
- Game attendance: 5,717
- Television network: SLCTV

Statistics	UCA	SHSU
First downs	22	29
Total yards	450	527
Rushing yards	107	336
Passing yards	343	191
Turnovers	1	2
Time of possession	26:40	33:20

Team	Category	Player	Statistics
Central Arkansas	Passing	Ryan Howard	26/44, 324 yards, 4 TD
Central Arkansas	Rushing	Willie Mathews	8 rushes, 59 yards
Central Arkansas	Receiving	Dezmin Lewis	8 receptions, 105 yards, TD
Sam Houston State	Passing	Jared Johnson	17/28, 191 yards, TD, 2 INT
Sam Houston State	Rushing	Keshawn Hill	32 rushes, 242 yards, 2 TD
Sam Houston State	Receiving	LaDarius Brown	4 receptions, 106 yards, TD

== FCS Playoffs ==
=== No. 11 Southeastern Louisiana (FCS Playoffs First Round) ===
No. 11 Southeastern Louisiana at No. 19 Sam Houston State

Team	1	2	3	4	Total
No. 11 Lions	3	7	0	7	17
• No. 19 Bearkats	0	0	7	14	21

- Date: November 29
- Location: Bowers Stadium
  Huntsville, TX
- Game start: 1:00 PM CST
- Game attendance: 4,758
- Television network: ESPN3

Scoring summary
1	13:40	SELA	Ryan Adams 25-yard field goal	SELA 3–0
2	14:19	SELA	Bryan Bennett 9-yard run (Ryan Adams kick)	SELA 10–0
3	7:14	SHSU	Jalen Overstreet 3-yard run (Luc Swimberghe kick)	SELA 10–7
4	14:57	SHSU	Donavan Williams 1-yard run (Luc Swimberghe kick)	SHSU 14–10
4	11:11	SELA	Bryan Bennett 2-yard run (Ryan Adams kick)	SELA 17–14
4	7:10	SHSU	Donavan Williams 5-yard run (Luc Swimberghe kick)	SHSU 21–17

Statistics	SELA	SHSU
First downs	21	13
Total yards	305	269
Rushing yards	124	150
Passing yards	181	119
Turnovers	1	4
Time of possession	34:36	25:24

Team	Category	Player	Statistics
Southeastern Louisiana	Passing	Bryan Bennett	17/48, 181 yards
Southeastern Louisiana	Rushing	Kody Sutton	13 rushes, 42 yards
Southeastern Louisiana	Receiving	Devante Scott	5 receptions, 53 yards
Sam Houston State	Passing	Jared Johnson	12/32, 119 yards, 2 INT
Sam Houston State	Rushing	Jared Johnson	17 rushes, 63 yards
Sam Houston State	Receiving	LaDarius Brown	3 receptions, 51 yards

=== At No. 3 Jacksonville State (FCS Playoffs Second Round) ===
No. 19 Sam Houston State at No. 3 Jacksonville State

Team	1	2	3	4	Total
• No. 19 Bearkats	7	17	13	0	37
No. 3 Gamecocks	14	12	0	0	26

- Date: December 6
- Location: JSU Stadium
  Jacksonville, AL
- Game start: 1:00 PM CST
- Game attendance: 10,832
- Television network: ESPN3

Statistics	SHSU	JVST
First downs	25	22
Total yards	402	513
Rushing yards	241	260
Passing yards	161	253
Turnovers	0	2
Time of possession	31:24	28:36

Team	Category	Player	Statistics
Sam Houston State	Passing	Jared Johnson	13/19, 161 yards, 3 TD
Sam Houston State	Rushing	Jared Johnson	18 rushes, 85 yards, TD
Sam Houston State	Receiving	LaDarius Brown	4 receptions, 88 yards, 2 TD
Jacksonville State	Passing	Eli Jenkins	12/24, 253 yards, TD, 2 INT
Jacksonville State	Rushing	DaMarcus James	19 rushes, 128 yards, TD
Jacksonville State	Receiving	Anthony Johnson	4 receptions, 74 yards

=== At No. 5 Villanova (FCS Playoffs Quarterfinals) ===
No. 19 Sam Houston State at No. 5 Villanova

Team	1	2	3	4	Total
• No. 19 Bearkats	7	10	7	10	34
No. 5 Wildcats	13	3	8	7	31

- Date: December 13
- Location: Villanova Stadium
  Villanova, PA
- Game start: 12:00 PM CST
- Game attendance: 2,333
- Television network: ESPN3

Statistics	SHSU	NOVA
First downs	22	23
Total yards	454	514
Rushing yards	151	286
Passing yards	303	228
Turnovers	0	0
Time of possession	30:30	29:30

Team	Category	Player	Statistics
Sam Houston State	Passing	Jared Johnson	22/27, 303 yards, 3 TD
Sam Houston State	Rushing	Keshawn Hill	20 rushes, 75 yards
Sam Houston State	Receiving	LaDarius Brown	6 receptions, 174 yards, 2 TD
Villanova	Passing	Chris Polony	13/24, 228 yards, TD
Villanova	Rushing	Kevin Monangai	27 rushes, 166 yards, TD
Villanova	Receiving	Poppy Livers	4 receptions, 96 yards, TD

=== At No. 2 North Dakota State (FCS Playoffs Semifinal) ===
No. 19 Sam Houston State at No. 2 North Dakota State

Team	1	2	3	4	Total
No. 19 Bearkats	0	3	0	0	3
• No. 2 Bison	7	0	14	14	35

- Date: December 19
- Location: Fargodome
  Fargo, ND
- Game start: 7:00 PM CST
- Game attendance: 18,025
- Television network: ESPN2

Scoring summary
1	3:52	NDSU	John Crockett 3-yard run (Adam Keller kick)	NDSU 7–0
2	13:37	SHSU	Luc Swimberghe 22-yard field goal	NDSU 7–3
3	7:34	NDSU	King Frazier 33-yard run (Adam Keller kick)	NDSU 14–3
3	6:32	NDSU	John Crockett 55-yard run (Adam Keller kick)	NDSU 21–3
4	11:37	NDSU	John Crockett 10-yard run (Adam Keller kick)	NDSU 28–3
4	3:38	NDSU	R. J. Urzendowski 14-yard pass from Carson Wentz (Adam Keller kick)	NDSU 35–3

Statistics	SHSU	NDSU
First downs	19	18
Total yards	338	398
Rushing yards	106	219
Passing yards	232	179
Turnovers	1	1
Time of possession	28:01	31:59

Team	Category	Player	Statistics
Sam Houston State	Passing	Jared Johnson	20/31, 227 yards, INT
Sam Houston State	Rushing	Jared Johnson	25 rushes, 66 yards
Sam Houston State	Receiving	Yedidiah Louis	6 receptions, 62 yards
North Dakota State	Passing	Carson Wentz	13/19, 179 yards, TD, INT
North Dakota State	Rushing	John Crockett	26 rushes, 166 yards, 3 TD
North Dakota State	Receiving	John Crockett	2 receptions, 66 yards

== Ranking movements ==
Ranking movements Legend: ██ Increase in ranking ██ Decrease in ranking — = Not ranked RV = Received votes
	Week														
Poll	Pre	1	2	3	4	5	6	7	8	9	10	11	12	13	Final
Sports Network	17	15	15	25	RV	RV	RV	24	RV	RV	RV	RV	23	19	6
Coaches	14	13	15	25	RV	RV	RV	25	RV	—	RV	RV	RV	19	6
