= 2014 Southeastern Louisiana Lions football team =

American college football season

2014 Southeastern Louisiana Lions football
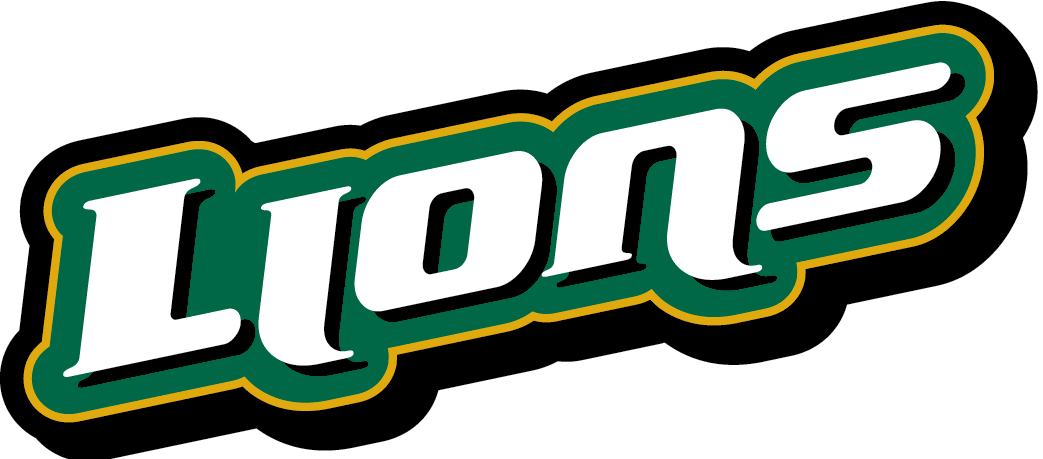

Southland co-champion

FCS Playoffs First Round, L 17–21 vs. Sam Houston State
- Conference: Southland Conference

Ranking
- Sports Network: No. 14
- FCS Coaches: No. 12
- Record: 9–4 (7–1 Southland)
- Head coach: Ron Roberts (3rd season)
- Offensive coordinator: Chet Pobolish (1st season)
- Defensive coordinator: Karl Scott (1st season)
- Home stadium: Strawberry Stadium

2014 Southland Conference football standings
	Conf.			Overall
Team	W		L	W		L
No. 6 Sam Houston St +^	7	–	1	11	–	5
No. 14 SE Louisiana +^	7	–	1	9	–	4
Lamar	5	–	3	8	–	4
Stephen F. Austin ^	5	–	3	8	–	5
Central Arkansas	5	–	3	6	–	6
McNeese State	4	–	4	6	–	5
Abilene Christian *	4	–	4	6	–	6
Northwestern State	4	–	4	6	–	6
Incarnate Word *	2	–	6	2	–	9
Houston Baptist	1	–	7	2	–	9
Nicholls State	0	–	8	0	–	12
+ – Conference co-champions; ^ – FCS playoff participant; * – ineligible for FCS playoffs due to transition from NCAA Division II; Rankings from The Sports Network poll

The 2014 Southeastern Louisiana Lions football team represented Southeastern Louisiana University in the 2014 NCAA Division I FCS football season. The Lions were led by third-year head coach Ron Roberts and played their home games at Strawberry Stadium. They are a member of the Southland Conference. They finished the season 9–4 overall, 7–1 in conference play to finish in a share for the Southland title. They received an at-large bid to the FCS Playoffs where they lost in the first round to fellow Southland Conference champion Sam Houston State 21–17.

== Schedule ==
Date	Time	Opponent	Rank	Site	TV	Result	Attendance
August 30	7:00 pm	Jacksonville*	No. 3	Strawberry Stadium; Hammond, LA	TSC	W 44–3	3,822
September 6	7:00 pm	Southern Utah*	No. 3	Strawberry Stadium; Hammond, LA	TSC	W 41–14	7,105
September 13	7:00 pm	at Tulane*	No. 3	Yulman Stadium; New Orleans, LA	ESPN3	L 20–35	26,358
September 20	6:00 pm	at Southeast Missouri State*	No. 3	Houck Stadium; Cape Girardeau, MO		L 23–24	7,538
September 27	6:00 pm	at Incarnate Word	No. 11	Gayle and Tom Benson Stadium; San Antonio, TX		W 63–7	3,474
October 4	3:00 pm	Northwestern State	No. 11	Strawberry Stadium; Hammond, LA (rivalry)	SLCTV	W 30–22	4,165
October 11	6:00 pm	at Lamar	No. 9	Provost Umphrey Stadium; Beaumont, TX		W 61–34	7,799
October 18	7:00 pm	Central Arkansas^{†}	No. 8	Strawberry Stadium; Hammond, LA	TSC	W 41–24	8,766
October 25	3:00 pm	at Stephen F. Austin	No. 8	Homer Bryce Stadium; Nacogdoches, TX	SLCTV	L 17–27	13,881
November 8	3:00 pm	Houston Baptist	No. 14	Strawberry Stadium; Hammond, LA	TSC	W 76–7	4,158
November 15	3:00 pm	No. 13 McNeese State	No. 10	Strawberry Stadium; Hammond, LA	SLCTV	W 28–9	7,012
November 20	6:00 pm	at Nicholls State	No. 10	John L. Guidry Stadium; Thibodaux, LA (River Bell Classic)	WHNO	W 62–3	5,103
November 29	1:00 pm	at No. 19 Sam Houston State*	No. 11	Bowers Stadium; Huntsville, TX (NCAA Division I First Round)	ESPN3	L 17–21	4,758
*Non-conference game; ^{†}Homecoming; Rankings from The Sports Network Poll released prior to the game; All times are in Central time

== Game summaries ==
=== Jacksonville ===
Jacksonville @ Southeastern Louisiana

Team	1	2	3	4	Total
Dolphins	0	3	0	0	3
• #3 Lions	27	3	7	7	44

- Date: August 30
- Location: Strawberry Stadium
  Hammond, LA
- Game start: 7:00 PM CDT
- Game attendance: 3,822
- Television network: Southeastern Channel

In their first game of the season, the Lions won, 44–3 over the Jacksonville Dolphins.

=== Southern Utah ===
Southern Utah @ Southeastern Louisiana

Team	1	2	3	4	Total
Thunderbirds	0	7	7	0	14
• #3 Lions	10	10	0	21	41

- Date: September 6
- Location: Strawberry Stadium
  Hammond, LA
- Game start: 7:00 PM CDT
- Game attendance: 7,105
- Television network: Southeastern Channel

In their second game of the season, the Lions won, 41–14 over the Southern Utah Thunderbirds.

=== @ Tulane ===
Southeastern Louisiana @ Tulane

Team	1	2	3	4	Total
#3 Lions	0	3	7	10	20
• Green Wave	7	21	0	7	35

- Date: September 13
- Location: Yulman Stadium
  New Orleans, LA
- Game start: 7:00 PM CDT
- Game attendance: 26,358
- Television network: ESPN3

In their third game of the season, the Lions lost, 35–20 to the Tulane Green Wave.

=== @ Southeast Missouri State ===
Southeastern Louisiana @ Southeast Missouri State

Team	1	2	3	4	Total
#3 Lions	3	7	0	13	23
• Redhawks	0	10	7	7	24

- Date: September 20
- Location: Houck Stadium
  Cape Girardeau, MO
- Game start: 6:00 PM CDT
- Game attendance: 7,538

In their fourth game of the season, the Lions lost, 24–23 to the Southeast Missouri State Redhawks.

=== @ Incarnate Word ===
Southeastern Louisiana @ Incarnate Word

Team	1	2	3	4	Total
• #11 Lions	14	14	28	7	63
Cardinals	0	7	0	0	7

- Date: September 27
- Location: Gayle and Tom Benson Stadium
  San Antonio, TX
- Game start: 6:00 PM CDT
- Game attendance: 3,474

In their fifth game of the season, the Lions won, 63–7 over the Incarnate Word Cardinals.

=== Northwestern State ===
Northwestern State @ Southeastern Louisiana

Team	1	2	3	4	Total
Demons	0	0	8	14	22
• #11 Lions	0	6	17	7	30

- Date: October 4
- Location: Strawberry Stadium
  Hammond, LA
- Game start: 3:00 PM CDT
- Game attendance: 4,165
- Television network: SLCTV

In their sixth game of the season, the Lions won, 30–22 over the Northwestern State Demons.

=== @ Lamar ===
Southeastern Louisiana @ Lamar

Team	1	2	3	4	Total
• #9 Lions	3	14	17	27	61
Cardinals	6	7	14	7	34

- Date: October 11
- Location: Provost Umphrey Stadium
  Beaumont, TX
- Game start: 6:00 PM CDT
- Game attendance: 7,799

In their seventh game of the season, the Lions won, 61–34 over the Lamar Cardinals.

=== Central Arkansas ===
Central Arkansas @ Southeastern Louisiana

Team	1	2	3	4	Total
Bears	10	0	7	7	24
• #8 Lions	14	3	3	21	41

- Date: October 18
- Location: Strawberry Stadium
  Hammond, LA
- Game start: 7:00 PM CDT
- Game attendance: 8,766
- Television network: Southeastern Channel

In their eighth game of the season, the Lions won, 41–24 over the Central Arkansas Bears.

=== @ Stephen F. Austin ===
Southeastern Louisiana @ Stephen F. Austin

Team	1	2	3	4	Total
#8 Lions	0	0	10	7	17
• Lumberjacks	7	10	0	10	27

- Date: October 25
- Location: Homer Bryce Stadium
  Nacogdoches, TX
- Game start: 3:00 PM CDT
- Game attendance: 13,881
- Television network: SLCTV

In their ninth game of the season, the Lions lost, 27–17 to the Stephen F. Austin Lumberjacks.

=== Houston Baptist ===
Houston Baptist @ Southeastern Louisiana

Team	1	2	3	4	Total
Huskies	7	0	0	0	7
• #14 Lions	14	28	20	14	76

- Date: November 8
- Location: Strawberry Stadium
  Hammond, LA
- Game start: 3:00 PM CST
- Elapsed time: 2:48
- Game attendance: 4,158
- Game weather: Temp: 68 Wind: N6 Weather: Clear
- Referee: Ross Smith
- Television network: TSC

In their tenth game of the season, the Lions won, 76–7 over the Houston Baptist Huskies.

=== McNeese State ===
McNeese State @ Southeastern Louisiana

Team	1	2	3	4	Total
#13 Cowboys	0	9	0	0	9
• #10 Lions	14	0	0	14	28

- Date: November 15
- Location: Strawberry Stadium
  Hammond, LA
- Game start: 3:00 PM CST
- Elapsed time: 3:10
- Game attendance: 7,012
- Game weather: Temperature: 58, Wind: E1, Weather: Clear
- Referee: Kevin Mar
- TV announcers (SLCTV): Randy McIlvoy, Shea Walker

In their eleventh game of the season, the Lions won, 28–9 over the McNeese State Cowboys.

=== @ Nicholls State ===
Southeastern Louisiana @ Nicholls State

Team	1	2	3	4	Total
• #10 Lions	7	20	21	14	62
Colonels	3	0	0	0	3

- Date: November 20
- Location: John L. Guidry Stadium
  Thibodaux, LA
- Game start: 6:00 PM CST
- Elapsed time: 3:17
- Game attendance: 5,103
- Game weather: Temperature: 59, Wind: SE 5 mph, Weather: Clear
- Referee: Ross Smith
- Television network: WHNO (LeSEA Broadcasting Corporation) Channel 20, New Orleans

In their twelfth game of the season, the Lions won, 62–3 over the Nicholls State Colonels.

=== @ Sam Houston State ===
Southeastern Louisiana @ Sam Houston State

Team	1	2	3	4	Total
#11 Lions	3	7	0	7	17
• #19 Bearkats	0	0	7	14	21

- Date: November 29
- Location: Bowers Stadium
  Huntsville, TX
- Game start: 1:04 PM CST
- Elapsed time: 3:41
- Game attendance: 4,758
- Referee: Ted Pitts
- Television network: ESPN3

In their thirteenth game of the season, the Lions lost, 21–17 to the Sam Houston State Bearkats in their 2014 FCS First Round playoff game.

== Ranking movements ==
Ranking movements Legend: ██ Increase in ranking ██ Decrease in ranking ( ) = First-place votes
	Week														
Poll	Pre	1	2	3	4	5	6	7	8	9	10	11	12	13	Final
Sports Network	3	3	3	3	11	11	9	8	8	15	14	10	10	11	14
Coaches	3	3	3 (1)	4	11	11	9	8	8	15	14	10	10	9	12
