= 2014 McNeese State Cowboys football team =

American college football season

2014 McNeese State Cowboys football
- Conference: Southland Conference
- Record: 6–5 (4–4 Southland)
- Head coach: Matt Viator (9th season)
- Offensive coordinator: Tim Leger (8th season)
- Co-offensive coordinator: Rob Sale (1st season)
- Defensive coordinator: Lance Guidry (2nd season)
- Home stadium: Cowboy Stadium

2014 Southland Conference football standings
	Conf.			Overall
Team	W		L	W		L
No. 6 Sam Houston St +^	7	–	1	11	–	5
No. 14 SE Louisiana +^	7	–	1	9	–	4
Lamar	5	–	3	8	–	4
Stephen F. Austin ^	5	–	3	8	–	5
Central Arkansas	5	–	3	6	–	6
McNeese State	4	–	4	6	–	5
Abilene Christian *	4	–	4	6	–	6
Northwestern State	4	–	4	6	–	6
Incarnate Word *	2	–	6	2	–	9
Houston Baptist	1	–	7	2	–	9
Nicholls State	0	–	8	0	–	12
+ – Conference co-champions; ^ – FCS playoff participant; * – ineligible for FCS playoffs due to transition from NCAA Division II; Rankings from The Sports Network poll

The 2014 McNeese State Cowboys football team represented McNeese State University as a member of the Southland Conference during the 2014 NCAA Division I FCS football season. Led by ninth-year head coach Matt Viator, the Cowboys compiled an overall record of 6–5 with a mark of 4–4 in conference play, placing in a three-way tie for sixth in the Southland. McNeese State played home games at Cowboy Stadium in Lake Charles, Louisiana.

== Schedule ==
Date	Time	Opponent	Rank	Site	TV	Result	Attendance
September 6	11:00 am	at No. 19 (FBS) Nebraska*	No. 7	Memorial Stadium; Lincoln, NE	ESPNU	L 24–31	91,082
September 13	6:00 pm	Prairie View A&M*	No. 6	Cowboy Stadium; Lake Charles, LA		W 48–16	17,469
September 27	6:00 pm	Arkansas Tech*	No. 5	Cowboy Stadium; Lake Charles, LA		W 61–7	11,429
October 4	6:00 pm	Nicholls State	No. 5	Cowboy Stadium; Lake Charles, LA		W 45–3	11,744
October 11	3:00 pm	at Sam Houston State	No. 5	Bowers Stadium; Huntsville, TX	SLCTV	L 22–38	8,418
October 18	6:00 pm	Abilene Christian^{†}	No. 11	Cowboy Stadium; Lake Charles, LA	ESPN3	W 31–20	14,464
October 25	6:00 pm	at Incarnate Word	No. 11	Gayle and Tom Benson Stadium; San Antonio, TX	FCS	W 41–21	4,558
November 1	6:00 pm	at Northwestern State	No. 9	Harry Turpin Stadium; Natchitoches, LA (rivalry)		W 35–28	9,178
November 8	6:00 pm	Stephen F. Austin	No. 6	Cowboy Stadium; Lake Charles, LA		L 16–31	10,069
November 15	3:00 pm	at No. 10 Southeastern Louisiana	No. 13	Strawberry Stadium; Hammond, LA	SLCTV	L 9–28	7,012
November 22	6:00 pm	Lamar	No. 19	Cowboy Stadium; Lake Charles, LA (Battle of the Border)		L 24–27	7,402
*Non-conference game; ^{†}Homecoming; Rankings from The Sports Network Poll released prior to the game; All times are in Central time

== Ranking movements ==
Ranking movements Legend: ██ Increase in ranking ██ Decrease in ranking RV = Received votes
	Week														
Poll	Pre	1	2	3	4	5	6	7	8	9	10	11	12	13	Final
Sports Network	8	7	6	6	5	5	5	11	11	9	6	13	19	RV	RV
Coaches	9	6	6	6	4	4	4	10	10	8	6	11	17	RV	RV
