= 2014 Incarnate Word Cardinals football team =

American college football season

2014 Incarnate Word Cardinals football
- Conference: Southland Conference
- Record: 2–9 (2–6 Southland)
- Head coach: Larry Kennan (3rd season)
- Offensive coordinator: Tony Marciano (5th season)
- Offensive scheme: Multiple
- Defensive coordinator: Brian Gamble (3rd season)
- Base defense: 3–4
- Home stadium: Gayle and Tom Benson Stadium

2014 Southland Conference football standings
	Conf.			Overall
Team	W		L	W		L
No. 6 Sam Houston St +^	7	–	1	11	–	5
No. 14 SE Louisiana +^	7	–	1	9	–	4
Lamar	5	–	3	8	–	4
Stephen F. Austin ^	5	–	3	8	–	5
Central Arkansas	5	–	3	6	–	6
McNeese State	4	–	4	6	–	5
Abilene Christian *	4	–	4	6	–	6
Northwestern State	4	–	4	6	–	6
Incarnate Word *	2	–	6	2	–	9
Houston Baptist	1	–	7	2	–	9
Nicholls State	0	–	8	0	–	12
+ – Conference co-champions; ^ – FCS playoff participant; * – ineligible for FCS playoffs due to transition from NCAA Division II; Rankings from The Sports Network poll

The 2014 Incarnate Word Cardinals football team represented the University of the Incarnate Word in the 2014 NCAA Division I FCS football season. The Cardinals played their first season in the Southland Conference. They were led by third-year head coach Larry Kennan. Home games were played at Gayle and Tom Benson Stadium. They finished the season 2–9, 2–6 in Southland play to finish in ninth place.

== TV and radio ==
All Incarnate Word games will be broadcast on CBS Sports Radio 860 AM with the voices of Gabe Farias and Shawn Morris. CBS Sports Radio 860 AM broadcasts will be available at their CBS Sports Radio 860 AM. KUIW Radio will also produce a student media broadcast every week, that will be available online, and they will provide streaming of all non-televised home games via UIWtv.

== Schedule ==
Date	Time	Opponent	Site	TV	Result	Attendance
August 30	6:00 pm	Sacramento State*	Gayle and Tom Benson Stadium; San Antonio, TX	UIWtv	L 13–49	4,078
September 6	6:00 pm	at Stephen F. Austin*	Homer Bryce Stadium; Nacogdoches, TX		L 3–38	8,103
September 13	2:30 pm	at No. 1 North Dakota State*	Fargodome; Fargo, ND (College GameDay)	ESPN3	L 0–58	19,020
September 20	3:05 pm	at Abilene Christian	Shotwell Stadium; Abilene, TX (P4X Foundation Classic)	SLCTV	L 0–21	12,674
September 27	6:00 pm	No. 11 Southeastern Louisiana	Gayle and Tom Benson Stadium; San Antonio, TX	UIWtv	L 7–63	3,474
October 4	6:00 pm	Houston Baptist	Gayle and Tom Benson Stadium; San Antonio, TX	UIWtv	W 31–8	3,412
October 11	6:00 pm	at Northwestern State	Harry Turpin Stadium; Natchitoches, LA	ESPN3	L 12–49	8,931
October 25	6:00 pm	No. 11 McNeese State^{†}	Gayle and Tom Benson Stadium; San Antonio, TX	FCS	L 21–41	4,558
November 1	6:00 pm	at Nicholls State	John L. Guidry Stadium; Thibodaux, LA		W 38–20	5,002
November 8	6:00 pm	Sam Houston State	Gayle and Tom Benson Stadium; San Antonio, TX	UIWtv	L 19–40	3,476
November 15	1:00 pm	at Lamar	Provost Umphrey Stadium; Beaumont, TX	BRSN	L 20–31	6,751
*Non-conference game; ^{†}Homecoming; Rankings from The Sports Network FCS Poll released prior to game Poll released prior to the game; All times are in Central time

Despite both being members of the Southland Conference, the game vs. Stephen F. Austin is considered a non-conference matchup and was scheduled between the two schools, not by the Conference.

== Personnel ==
=== Coaching staff ===
Name	Position	Alma mater	Joined staff
Larry Kennan	Head coach	La Verne	2012
Todd Ivicic	Associate head coach / Defensive Line / special teams coordinator	Sam Houston State	2008
Tony Marciano	Assistant Head Coach / offensive coordinator / Offensive Line	IUP	2010
Brian Gamble	Defensive coordinator / Inside Linebackers	Texas A&M	2008
Kyle Kennan	Passing Game coordinator / wide receivers	Roger Williams	2008
Nick Debose	Defensive Backs / video coordinator	Southeastern Oklahoma	2008
Michael Briglin	Running Backs / Equipment	SUNY Oswego	2010
Larry Moore	Running Backs / academic coordinator	BYU	2011
Sean Davis	Quarterbacks / recruiting coordinator / Compliance Liaison	Azusa Pacific	2013
Kenith Pope	Outside Linebackers	Oklahoma	2014
Alan Ford	Assistant Linebackers	Incarnate Word	2014
Darin Lovat	Strength and Conditioning Coach	UNLV	2012
T.R. St. Charles	Head Football Athletic Trainer	Vanderbilt	2008

=== Roster ===
2014 Incarnate Word Cardinals Football
Quarterback: 3 Taylor Woods – junior (6'3, 205); 4 Trent Brittain – (redshirt) sophomore (6'2, 200); 5 Breylann McCollum – (redshirt) freshman (6'2, 215); 14 Kyle Fishbeck – (redshirt) junior (6'2, 205); 17 Jordan Scelfo – (redshirt) junior (5'10, 200); Running back: 7 Dorland Fields – freshman (5'10, 190); 20 Keshon Leonard – freshman (5'7, 160); 24 Sean Flannel – (redshirt) sophomore (5'10, 180); 25 Broderick Reeves – sophomore (5'9, 195); 26 Junior Sessions – sophomore (5'10, 220); 29 John Oglesby – sophomore (6'1, 215); 33 Joseph Sadler – (redshirt) sophomore (5'9, 190); Wide receiver: 2 Jordan Hicks – sophomore (5'8, 165); 6 Kent Hadnot – (redshirt) junior (6'2, 175); 8 Casey Jennings – senior (6'0, 195); 11 Clint Killough – (redshirt) junior (5'10, 175); 16 Daryl Brooks – sophomore (6'3, 190); 21 Stefon Martin – junior (6'2, 180); 22 Jamari Gilbert – (redshirt) freshman (6'1, 185); 81 Kody Edwards – freshman (6'0, 150); 82 Taylor Hudson – (redshirt) junior (6'0, 180); 84 Trevor Smith – junior (5'6, 175); 85 Anthony Marciano – freshman (6'0, 175); 86 Gabriel Taylor – (redshirt) junior (6'7, 210); 87 Alonso Roscoe – freshman (6'0, 200); Tight end: 44 Cyril Clarke – (redshirt) sophomore (6'1, 227); 45 Cole Wick – junior (6'7, 245); 80 Kaleb Hardy – (redshirt) freshman (6'3, 220); 83 Michael Thomas – (redshirt) freshman (6'3, 230); 89 Avery Smith – (redshirt) freshman (6'5, 240)	Full Back: 40 Nick Morrow – senior (6'1, 230); 46 Jamaal Ojo – (redshirt) sophomore (6'0, 222); Offensive line: 53 Matt McCarthy – C – junior (6'2, 270); 57 Devyn Jensen – OG – freshman (6'3, 290); 60 Albert Miranda – OG – senior (6'3, 303); 63 Tyler Preston – C – freshman (6'2, 290); 64 Roberto Limon – OG – freshman (6'2, 310); 66 Fabian Mata – OL – freshman (6'1, 360); 67 Jason Everding – OG – senior (6'4, 295); 69 Trevor Mason – OT – (redshirt) sophomore (6'7, 295); 70 Nathan Thompson – OT – junior (6'5, 290); 71 Horace Hayes – OT – (redshirt) junior (6'3, 285); 75 Prince Eshan – OL – (redshirt) freshman (6'3, 308); 76 Austin Jennings – OG – (redshirt) freshman (6'3, 280); 77 Devin Threat – C – senior (6'4, 310); 78 Cameron Jackson – OL – freshman (6'5, 335); Defensive line: 41 Robert Moorman – DE – (redshirt) junior (6'1, 245); 54 Corey Lee – DT – sophomore (6'0, 285); 79 Josh Esukpa – DE – (redshirt) sophomore (6'1, 285); 88 Justin Roberts – DE – sophomore (6'4, 255); 91 Dallin Muti – DT – (redshirt) junior (5'11, 290); 93 Tyler Colbert – DT – (redshirt) freshman (6'1, 295); 94 Adrian Parker – DT – freshman (5'10, 270); 95 Quinten Kocian – DE – junior (6'3, 260); 96 Taryn Davis – DE – sophomore (6'6, 242); 97 Eric England – DT – freshman (6'1, 260); 98 Jawara Beasley – DE – freshman (6'3, 235); Special teams: 49 Ramon Coto, Jr. – K/P – freshman (5'11, 230); 61 Stephen Featherston – LS – freshman (6'0, 205)	Linebacker: 19 Jerome McElroy – OLB – junior (6'0, 245); 30 Joel Higgins – ILB – sophomore (6'0, 210); 35 Padyn Giebler – ILB – junior (6'0, 235); 39 Tanner Scheel – OLB – sophomore (5'11, 200); 42 Nick Ginn – OLB – senior (6'2, 235); 43 Michael Allen – ILB – sophomore (6'0, 205); 47 Joshua Campbell – ILB – (redshirt) junior (6'0, 235); 50 George Schwanenberg – ILB – freshman (5'11, 215); 51 Denzel Thomas – OLB – freshman (6'1, 230); 56 Nico Trinidad – OLB – senior (5'10, 238); 56 Noah McMeans – OLB – sophomore (6'4, 220); 59 West Lambert – ILB – (redshirt) freshman (6'0, 230); 92 Blake Klumpp – OLB – (redshirt) sophomore (6'3, 235); Defensive back: 1 Daryl Irby – CB – (redshirt) sophomore (5'10, 175); 7 Jarrius James – CB – senior (6'1, 165); 10 Brandon Tanksley – S – junior (6'2, 210); 12 Robert Johnson – S – junior (5'11, 195); 13 Jeilyn Williams – CB – freshman (5'9, 165); 15 Quandre Washington – S – freshman (6'1, 210); 17 Sean Hoeferkamp – S – freshman (6'1, 190); 18 Adrian Norwood, Jr. – S – sophomore (5'11, 205); 20 Tre Spragg – S – senior (5'9, 190); 23 Kobie Douglass – CB – (redshirt) junior (5'9, 155); 27 Trey Colbert – CB – (redshirt) sophomore (6'0, 200); 28 Kielyn Lewis – CB – senior (6'1, 220); 31 Troy Lara – S – (redshirt) junior (5'11, 190); 32 Jamarkese Williams – CB – (redshirt) sophomore (6'3, 190); 36 Shane Piatnik – DB – freshman (6'1, 175); 37 Stephen Howard – CB – senior (5'9, 175); 38 Tim McCoy – S – freshman (5'11, 200); 48 David Nader – S – (redshirt) freshman (5'11, 200)

== Game summaries ==
=== Sacramento State ===
Sacramento State at Incarnate Word

Team	1	2	3	4	Total
• Hornets	21	14	14	0	49
Cardinals	6	0	0	7	13

- Date: August 30
- Location: Gayle and Tom Benson Stadium
  San Antonio, TX
- Game start: 6:00 PM CST
- Game attendance: 4,078
- TV announcers (UIWtv): Chris Reyes & Anthony Gollab

=== Stephen F. Austin ===
Incarnate Word at Stephen F. Austin

Team	1	2	3	4	Total
Cardinals	0	0	3	0	3
• Lumberjacks	14	0	7	17	38

- Date: September 6
- Location: Homer Bryce Stadium
  Nacogdoches, TX
- Game attendance: 8,103

=== North Dakota State ===
Incarnate Word at North Dakota State

Team	1	2	3	4	Total
Cardinals	0	0	0	0	0
• #1 Bison	14	14	23	7	58

- Date: September 13
- Location: Fargodome
  Fargo, ND
- Game attendance: 19,020
- TV announcers (ESPN3): Brian Shawn, Lee Timmerman, Kevin Fenney, & Jamal Spencer

=== Abilene Christian ===
Incarnate Word at Abilene Christian

Team	1	2	3	4	Total
Cardinals	0	0	0	0	0
• Wildcats	14	0	7	0	21

- Date: September 20
- Location: Shotwell Stadium
  Abilene, TX
- Game start: 3:00 PM CST
- Game attendance: 12,674
- TV announcers (SLCTV/WOAI): Randy McIlvoy, Shea Walker, & Brooke Bentley

=== Southeastern Louisiana ===
Southeastern Louisiana at Incarnate Word

Team	1	2	3	4	Total
• #11 Lions	14	14	28	7	63
Cardinals	0	7	0	0	7

- Date: September 27
- Location: Gayle and Tom Benson Stadium
  San Antonio, TX
- Game attendance: 3,474
- TV announcers (UIWtv): Chris Reyes & Anthony Gollab

=== Houston Baptist ===
Houston Baptist at Incarnate Word

Team	1	2	3	4	Total
Huskies	0	0	0	8	8
• Cardinals	7	10	7	7	31

- Date: October 4
- Location: Gayle and Tom Benson Stadium
  San Antonio, TX
- Game attendance: 3,412
- TV announcers (UIWtv): Chrs Reyes & Anthony Gollab

=== Northwestern State ===
Incarnate Word at Northwestern State

Team	1	2	3	4	Total
Cardinals	0	3	3	6	12
• Demons	7	28	14	0	49

- Date: October 11
- Location: Harry Turpin Stadium
  Natchitoches, LA
- Game attendance: 8,931

=== McNeese State ===
McNeese State at Incarnate Word

Team	1	2	3	4	Total
• Cowboys	7	21	6	7	41
Cardinals	0	0	14	7	21

- Date: October 25
- Location: Gayle and Tom Benson Stadium
  San Antonio, TX
- Game start: 6:00 PM CST
- Elapsed time: 3:14
- Game attendance: 4,558
- Game weather: Temperature: 82 • Wind: 5 N • Weather: Clear and Hot
- Referee: C. Castleberry
- TV announcers (FCS Central): David Saltzman & Neal Raphael

=== Nicholls State ===
Incarnate Word at Nicholls State

Team	1	2	3	4	Total
• Cardinals	10	14	7	7	38
Colonels	0	14	0	6	20

- Date: November 1
- Location: John L. Guidry Stadium
  Thibodaux, LA
- Game start: 7:00 PM CST
- Elapsed time: 5,002

=== Sam Houston State ===
Sam Houston State at Incarnate Word

Team	1	2	3	4	Total
• Bearkats	23	7	3	7	40
Cardinals	0	16	0	3	19

- Date: November 8
- Location: Gayle and Tom Benson Stadium
  San Antonio, TX
- Game attendance: 3,476
- TV announcers (UIWtv): Chris Reyes & Anthony Gollab

=== Lamar ===
Incarnate Word at Lamar

Team	1	2	3	4	Total
UIW	0	13	0	7	20
• Lamar	7	14	10	0	31

- Date: November 15
- Location: Provost Umphrey Stadium
  Beaumont, TX
- Game start: 6:00 pm CST
- Elapsed time: 3:15
- Game attendance: 6,751
- Game weather: Temperature: 54 deg. • Wind: 9mph NW • Weather: Cloudy
- Referee: Randy Christal
- TV announcers (Live Streaming - Big Red Sports Network): Harold Mann - Play by Play, Bo Brown - Color

Scoring summary
1	03:02	LU	Harrington, Kad 1 yd run (Carranco, Juan kick)	0-7
2	11:50	LU	Gladney, Gratian 8 yd pass from Berry, Caleb (Carranco, Juan kick)	0-14
2	10:41	UIW	Reeves, Broderick 35 yd run (Coto, Ramon kick failed)	6-14
2	05:19	LU	Nelson, Jayce 9 yd pass from Berry, Caleb (Carranco, Juan kick)	6-21
2	03:53	UIW	Reeves, Broderick 25 yd run (Coto, Ramon kick)	21-13
3	11:03	LU	Roberts, Mark 78 yd pass from Berry, Caleb (Carranco, Juan kick)	13-28
3	00:42	LU	Carranco, Juan 26 yd field goal	13-31
4	05:30	UIW	Brooks, Daryl 2 yd pass from Scelfo, Jordan (Coto, Ramon kick)	20-31
