= 2014 Houston Baptist Huskies football team =

American college football season

2014 Houston Baptist Huskies football
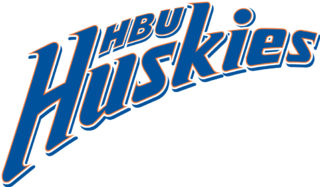
- Conference: Southland Conference
- Record: 2–9 (1–7 Southland)
- Head coach: Vic Shealy (2nd season)
- Offensive coordinator: Scott Smith (2nd season)
- Offensive scheme: Multiple
- Co-defensive coordinators: Roger Hinshaw (2nd season); Brent Vieselmeyer (2nd season)
- Base defense: 4–3
- Home stadium: Husky Stadium

2014 Southland Conference football standings
	Conf.			Overall
Team	W		L	W		L
No. 6 Sam Houston St +^	7	–	1	11	–	5
No. 14 SE Louisiana +^	7	–	1	9	–	4
Lamar	5	–	3	8	–	4
Stephen F. Austin ^	5	–	3	8	–	5
Central Arkansas	5	–	3	6	–	6
McNeese State	4	–	4	6	–	5
Abilene Christian *	4	–	4	6	–	6
Northwestern State	4	–	4	6	–	6
Incarnate Word *	2	–	6	2	–	9
Houston Baptist	1	–	7	2	–	9
Nicholls State	0	–	8	0	–	12
+ – Conference co-champions; ^ – FCS playoff participant; * – ineligible for FCS playoffs due to transition from NCAA Division II; Rankings from The Sports Network poll

The 2014 Houston Baptist Huskies football team represented Houston Baptist University—now known as Houston Christian University—as a member of the Southland Conference during the 2014 NCAA Division I FCS football season. Led by second-year head coach Vic Shealy the Huskies compiled an overall record of 2–9 with a mark of 1–7 in conference play, placing tenth in the Southland. 2014 was Houston Baptist's first official season of college football—the seven-game 2013 season was technically an exhibition season—and the first as a member of the Southland Conference for football.

The season also marked the start of play in a new on-campus stadium, Husky Stadium on the Dunham Field. The first game in the new stadium was played on September 6 against McMurry.

== Schedule ==
Date	Time	Opponent	Site	TV	Result	Attendance
September 6	7:00 p.m.	McMurry*	Husky Stadium; Houston, TX	FSSW	L 17–26	4,018
September 13	2:30 p.m.	at Northern Colorado*	Nottingham Field; Greeley, CO	BSTV	L 20–28	4,080
September 20	12:00 p.m.	at Texas College*	Mewbourne Stadium; Tyler, TX		W 72–6	1,110
September 27	7:00 p.m.	Abilene Christian	Husky Stadium; Houston, TX	FSSW	L 14–59	3,823
October 4	6:00 p.m.	at Incarnate Word	Gayle and Tom Benson Stadium; San Antonio, TX	UIWtv	L 8–31	3,412
October 11	6:00 p.m.	at Central Arkansas	Estes Stadium; Conway, AR		L 0–70	4,726
October 18	7:00 p.m.	Stephen F. Austin	Husky Stadium; Houston, TX	FSSW	L 27–59	3,158
October 25	7:00 p.m.	Nicholls State^{†}	Husky Stadium; Houston, TX	ESPN3	W 31–21	3,386
November 1	6:00 p.m.	at Lamar	Provost Umphrey Stadium; Beaumont, TX	ESPN3	L 14–72	10,212
November 8	3:00 p.m.	at No. 14 Southeastern Louisiana	Strawberry Stadium; Hammond, LA	TSC	L 7–76	4,158
November 15	3:00 p.m.	Sam Houston State	Husky Stadium; Houston, TX	FSSW	L 0–76	3,124
*Non-conference game; ^{†}Homecoming; Rankings from The Sports Network Poll released prior to the game; All times are in Central time

== Game summaries ==
=== McMurry ===
McMurry at Houston Baptist

Team	1	2	3	4	Total
• War Hawks	7	6	7	6	26
Huskies	8	0	6	3	17

- Date: September 6
- Location: HBU Stadium
  Houston, TX
- Game start: 7:00 PM CST
- Game attendance: 4,018
- TV announcers (FSSW): Tom Franklin & Jeff Power

Scoring summary
1	11:47	Houston Baptist	Travis Shinn 38 yard field goal	3–0
1	8:12	McMurry	Chris Simpson 6 yard run (Joey Silva kick)	3–7
1	5:48	Houston Baptist	Josh Jones Safety	5–7
1	2:07	Houston Baptist	Travis Shinn 28 yard field goal	8–7
2	11:06	McMurry	Jeret Smith 5 yard run (Joey Silva PAT blocked)	8–13
3	9:29	Houston Baptist	D'Angelo Wallace 14 yard pass from Jonathan Fleming (Travis Shinn PAT failed)	14–13
3	6:11	McMurry	Jeret Smith 22 yard pass from Matthew McHugh (Joey Silva kick)	14–20
4	12:06	Houston Baptist	Travis Shinn 20 yard field goal	17–20
4	5:39	McMurry	Jeret Smith 55 yard pass from Matthew McHugh (Joey Silva PAT blocked)	17–26

Statistics	MCM	HBU
First downs	18	26
Total yards	405	324
Rushing yards	102	145
Passing yards	303	179
Turnovers	4	4
Time of possession	28:41	31:19

Team	Category	Player	Statistics
McMurry	Passing	Matthew McHugh	14/23, 303 yards, 2 TD, 2 INT
McMurry	Rushing	Chris Simpson Jr.	12 rushes, 45 yards, TD
McMurry	Receiving	Jeret Smith	6 receptions, 123 yards, 2 TD
Houston Baptist	Passing	Jonathan Fleming	20/39, 179 yards, TD, 2 INT
Houston Baptist	Rushing	B. J. Kelley	13 rushes, 64 yards
Houston Baptist	Receiving	D'Angelo Wallace	6 receptions, 61 yards, TD

=== at Northern Colorado ===
Northern Colorado at Houston Baptist

Team	1	2	3	4	Total
Huskies	3	7	10	0	20
• Bears	7	8	0	13	28

- Date: September 13
- Location: Nottingham Field
  Greeley, CO
- Game start: 2:30 PM CST
- Elapsed time: 3:17
- Game attendance: 4,080
- Game weather: 66 °F (19 °C) • E 5–10 mph (8.0–16.1 km/h) • Sunny
- Referee: Gregg Wilson

Scoring summary
1	11:10	Houston Baptist	Travis Shinn 35 yard field goal, 6 plays, 15 yards, 2:00	3–0
1	2:16	Northern Colorado	Dimitri Stimphil 50 yard pass from Sean Rubalcaba (Seth Czapenski kick), 7 plays, 96 yards, 3:08	3–7
2	12:11	Houston Baptist	Larry Day 4 yard run (Travis Shinn kick), 14 plays, 78 yards, 4:59	10–7
2	2:54	Northern Colorado	Robert Holland 2 yard run (Thomas Singleton run for two–point conversion), 3 plays, 11 yards, 1:27	10–15
3	7:54	Houston Baptist	Eric Amoako 31 yard fumble return (Travis Shinn kick), 1 play, 2 yards, 0:12	17–15
3	0:16	Houston Baptist	Travis Shinn 24 yard field goal, 12 plays, 43 yards, 5:29	20–15
4	10:04	Northern Colorado	Sean Rubalcaba 2 yard run (two-point conversion failed), 11 plays, 84 yards, 5:00	20–21
4	4:46	Northern Colorado	Darius Graham 7 yard run (Jamie Falloon kick), 8 plays, 50 yards, 4:00	20–28

=== at Texas College ===
Houston Baptist at Texas College

Team	1	2	3	4	Total
• Huskies	21	21	9	21	72
Steers	0	0	6	0	6

- Date: September 20
- Location: Mewbourne Stadium
  Tyler, TX
- Game start: 12:00 PM CST
- Elapsed time: 2:58
- Game attendance: 1,100

Scoring summary
1	11:58	Houston Baptist	Davi Iheanacho 12 yard pass from Jonath Fleming (Travis Shinn kick)	7–0
1	10:14	Houston Baptist	Ethan Fry 33 yard pass from Jonath Fleming (Travis Shinn kick)	14–0
1	5:16	Houston Baptist	Wesley Lewis 13 yard pass from Jonath Fleming (Travis Shinn kick)	21–0
2	14:26	Houston Baptist	Larry Day 1 yard run (Travis Shinn kick)	28–0
2	9:18	Houston Baptist	B.J. Kelly 1 yard run (Travis Shinn kick)	35–0
2	4:32	Houston Baptist	Kennet Bibbins 25 yard pass from Jonath Fleming (Travis Shinn kick)	42–0
3	6:47	Texas College	Bradford Lewis 24 yard pass from Milton Harper	42–6
3	4:40	Houston Baptist	Kennet Bibbins 48 yard pass from Jonath Fleming (Travis Shinn kick)	49–6
3	3:27	Houston Baptist	Tyler Helaire Safety	51–6
4	13:31	Houston Baptist	Jonatha Buffin 10 yard interception return (Travis Shinn kick)	58–6
4	7:35	Houston Baptist	Steve Thompson 10 yard run (Travis Shinn kick)	65–6
4	2:18	Houston Baptist	Steve Thompson 33 yard run (Travis Shinn kick)	72–6

=== Abilene Christian ===
Abilene Christian at Houston Baptist

Team	1	2	3	4	Total
• Wildcats	10	28	7	14	59
Huskies	7	7	0	0	14

- Date: September 27
- Location: HBU Stadium
  Houston, TX
- Game start: 7:00 PM CST
- Elapsed time: 3:04
- Game attendance: 3,823
- Game weather: 81 °F (27 °C) • 2 mph (3.2 km/h) • Scattered Clouds
- Referee: Ross Smith
- TV announcers (FSSW): Brett Dolan & Jeff Power

Scoring summary
1	13:39	Houston Baptist	Kenneth Bibbins 46 yard pass from Jonathan Fleming (Travis Shinn kick), 2 plays, 48 yards, 0:36	7–0
1	9:57	Abilene Christian	Nik Grau 33 yard field goal, 11 plays, 49 yards, 2:20	7–3
1	5:26	Abilene Christian	Cedric Gilbert 9 yard pass from Parker McKenzie (Nik Grau kick), 6 plays, 62 yards, 2:15	7–10
2	12:36	Abilene Christian	Herschel Sims 3 yard run (Nik Grau kick), 7 plays, 51 yards, 2:59	7–17
2	9:00	Abilene Christian	Herschel Sims 2 yard run (Nik Grau kick), 5 plays, 75 yards, 1:56	7–24
2	6:15	Abilene Christian	Cade Stone 20 yard pass from Parker McKenzie (Nik Grau kick), 3 plays, 59 yards, 0:41	7–31
2	4:48	Houston Baptist	Darian Lazard 77 yard pass from Ka'Darius Baker (Travis Shinn kick) 3 plays, 84 yards, 1:18	14–31
2	3:00	Abilene Christian	Herschel Sims 4 yard run (Nik Grau kick), 4 plays, 73 yards, 1:42	14–38
3	14:44	Abilene Christian	Cade Stone 19 yard pass from Parker McKenzie (Nik Grau kick), 1 play, 19 yards, 0:06	14–45
4	14:35	Abilene Christian	Cedric Gilbert 13 yard pass from Parker McKenzie (Nik Grau kick), 4 plays, 49 yards, 1:23	14–52
4	5:30	Abilene Christian	Randy Gober 12 yard run (Ben Hynds kick), 12 plays, 78 yards, 6:59	14–59

=== at Incarnate Word ===
Houston Baptist at Incarnate Word

Team	1	2	3	4	Total
Huskies	0	0	0	8	8
• Cardinals	7	10	7	7	31

- Date: September 6
- Location: Gayle and Tom Benson Stadium
  San Antonio, TX
- Game start: 6:00 PM CST
- Elapsed time: 2:37
- Game attendance: 3,412
- Game weather: 79 °F (26 °C) • SSE 9 mph (14 km/h) • Clear
- Referee: Ross Smith
- TV announcers (UIWtv): Chris Reyes and Anthony Gollab

Scoring summary
1	7:17	Incarnate Word	Broderick Reeves 3 yard run (Ramon Coto Jr. kick), 11 plays, 76 yards, 5:58	0–7
2	4:25	Incarnate Word	Casey Jennings 34 yard pass from Breylann McCollum (Ramon Coto Jr. kick), 10 plays, 73 yards, 5:03	0–14
2	0:10	Incarnate Word	Ramon Coto Jr. 40 yard field goal, 4 plays, 7 yards, 0:29	0–17
3	1:36	Incarnate Word	Junior Sessions 20 yard run (Ramon Coto Jr. Kick), 14 plays, 95 yards, 7:21	0–24
4	8:33	Houston Baptist	B.J. Kelly 16 yard run (Ka'Darius Baker pass to Kenneth Bibbins for two-point conversion), 16 plays, 78 yards, 7:56	8–24
4	1:12	Incarnate Word	Junior Sessions 3 yard run (Ramon Coto Jr. Kick), 7 plays, 44 yards, 2:39	8–31

=== at Central Arkansas ===
Houston Baptist at Central Arkansas

Team	1	2	3	4	Total
Huskies	0	0	0	0	0
• Bears	21	35	14	0	70

- Date: September 6
- Location: Estes Stadium
  Conway, AR
- Game start: 6:00 PM CST
- Elapsed time: 2:54
- Game attendance: 4,726
- Referee: K. Boitman

Scoring summary
1	8:29	Central Arkansas	Desmond Smith 36 yard pass from Taylor Reed (Eddie Camara kick), 6 plays, 70 yards, 2:06	0–7
1	6:29	Central Arkansas	Damien Watts 46 yard pass from Taylor Reed (Eddie Camara kick), 3 plays, 70 yards, 1:03	0–14
1	3:45	Central Arkansas	Justin Dickey 73 yard pass from Ryan Howard (Eddie Camara kick), 3 plays, 84 yards, 1:00	0–21
2	14:29	Central Arkansas	Taylor Reed 6 yard run (Eddie Camara kick), 7 plays, 48 yards, 2:17	0–28
2	14:15	Central Arkansas	Ricky Wyatt 23 yard interception return (Eddie Camara kick), 1 play, 0 yards, 0:09	0–35
2	11:05	Central Arkansas	Dominique Thomas 56 yard run (Eddie Camara kick), 1 play, 56 yards, 0:12	0–42
2	8:01	Central Arkansas	Dominique Thomas 12 yard run (Eddie Camara kick), 4 plays, 58 yards, 1:35	0–49
2	1:19	Central Arkansas	Courtney Whitehead 60 yard pass from Hayden Hildebrand (Eddie Camara kick), 4 plays, 73 yards, 0:37	0–56
3	11:16	Central Arkansas	George Odum 36 yard punt return (Jace Denker kick), 5 plays, -7 yards, 3:44	0–63
3	6:00	Central Arkansas	Darrien Daniels 1 yard run (Jace Denker kick), 6 plays, 59 yards, 3:26	0–70

=== Stephen F. Austin ===
Stephen F. Austin at Houston Baptist

Team	1	2	3	4	Total
• Lumberjacks	24	7	7	21	59
Huskies	6	7	7	7	27

- Date: October 18
- Location: HBU Stadium
  Houston, TX
- Game start: 7:00 CDT
- Elapsed time: 4:57
- Game attendance: 3,158
- Game weather: 82 °F (28 °C) • 6 mph (9.7 km/h) • Mostly Sunny
- Referee: Kevin Hassell
- TV announcers (FSSW): Brett Dolan & Jeff Power

Scoring summary
1	14:40	Stephen F Austin	Gus Johnson 2 yard run (Jordan Wiggs kick), 1 play, 2 yards, 0:20	0–7
1	11:33	Stephen F Austin	Aaron Thomas 36 yard pass from Zach Conque (Jordan Wiggs kick), 3 plays, 78 yards, 1:01	0–14
1	9:51	Houston Baptist	Craig Bell Jr. 34 yard run (Travis Shinn PAT failed), 5 plays, 75 yards, 1:42	6–14
1	6:07	Stephen F Austin	Zach Conque 8 yard run (Jordan Wiggs kick), 11 plays, 75 yards, 3:37	6–21
1	2:06	Stephen F Austin	Jordan Wiggs 33 yard field goal, 4 plays, -5 yards, 1:41	6–24
2	9:25	Stephen F Austin	Gus Johnson 15 yard run (Jordan Wiggs kick), 3 plays, 58 yards, 1:05	6–31
2	2:09	Houston Baptist	Craig Bell Jr. 1 yard run (Travis Shinn kick), 16 plays, 79 yards, 7:11	13–31
3	12:41	Houston Baptist	D'Angelo Wallace 7 yard pass from Jonathan Fleming (Travis Shinn kick), 7 plays, 82 yards, 2:13	20–31
3	3:25	Stephen F Austin	Gus Johnson 17 yard run (Jordan Wiggs kick), 10 plays, 50 yards, 4:32	20–38
4	13:57	Stephen F Austin	Justice Liggins 7 yard pass from Zach Conque (Jordan Wiggs kick), 8 plays, 68 yards, 3:03	20–45
4	13:26	Houston Baptist	Kenneth Bibbins 58 yard pass from Jonathan Fleming (Travis Shinn kick), 2 plays, 88 yards, 0:24	27–45
4	10:40	Stephen F Austin	Aaron Thomas 5 yard pass from Zach Conque (Jordan Wiggs kick), 1 play, 5 yards, 0:06	27–52
4	6:30	Stephen F Austin	Cameron Washington 5 yard run (Mason Juhl kick), 5 plays, 20 yards, 2:00	27–59

=== Nicholls ===
Nicholls at Houston Baptist

Team	1	2	3	4	Total
Colonels	7	0	14	0	21
• Huskies	7	10	0	14	31

- Date: October 25
- Location: HBU Stadium
  Houston, TX
- Game start: 7:04 PM CDT
- Elapsed time: 2:57
- Game attendance: 3,386
- Game weather: 84 °F (29 °C) • ENE 6 mph (9.7 km/h) • Clear
- Referee: Ross Smith
- TV announcers (ESPN3): Lincoln Rose & Rene Nadeau

Scoring summary
1	11:35	Nicholls	Michael Henry 5 yard run (Conner Fryoux kick), 11 plays, 75 yards, 3:25	0–7
1	3:13	Houston Baptist	Larry Day 1 yard run (Travis Shinn kick), 11 plays, 60 yards, 5:02	7–7
2	7:36	Houston Baptist	D'Angelo Wallace 5 yard pass from Jonathan Fleming (Travis Shinn kick), 17 plays, 83 yards, 7:46	14–7
2	0:00	Houston Baptist	Travis Shinn 20 yard field goal, 6 plays, 28 yards, 1:00	17–7
3	8:49	Nicholls	Demon Bolt 60 yard pass from Beaux Hebert (Conner Fryoux kick), 3 plays, 75 yards, 1:09	17–14
3	0:38	Nicholls	Michael Henry 15 yard run (Conner Fryoux kick), 11 plays, 71 yards, 5:49	17–21
4	12:41	Houston Baptist	B.J. Kelly 29 yard run (Travis Shinn kick), 9 plays, 85 yards, 2:52	24–21
4	7:07	Houston Baptist	Kenneth Bibbins 24 yard pass from Jonathan Fleming (Travis Shinn kick), 8 plays, 62 yards, 3:22	31–21

=== at Lamar ===
Houston Baptist at Lamar

Team	1	2	3	4	Total
Huskies	0	7	0	7	14
• Cardinals	28	34	10	0	72

- Date: November 1
- Location: Provost Umphrey Stadium
  Beaumont, TX
- Game start: 6:04 pm CDT
- Elapsed time: 3:19
- Game attendance: 10,212
- Game weather: 64 °F (18 °C) • 5 mph (8.0 km/h) • Clear and cold
- Referee: Kevin Hassell
- TV announcers (ESPN3): Lincoln Rose and Rene Nadeau

Scoring summary
1	11:24	Lamar	Mark Roberts 31 yard pass from Caleb Berry (Juan Carranco kick), 8 plays, 62 yards, 3:36	0–7
1	7:03	Lamar	Mark Roberts 61 yard pass from Caleb Berry (Juan Carranco kick), 1 play, 91 yards, 0:09	0–14
1	2:20	Lamar	Gratia Gladney 57 yard pass from Caleb Berry (Juan Carranco kick), 3 plays, 72 yards, 0:58	0–21
1	1:01	Lamar	Mark Roberts 81 yard pass from Caleb Berry (Juan Carranco kick), 1 play, 81 yards, 0:11	0–28
2	12:57	Lamar	Devonn Brown 25 yard pass from Caleb Berry (Juan Carranco kick), 3 plays, 32 yards, 0:44	0–35
2	8:13	Lamar	Jayce Nelson 24 yard pass from Caleb Berry (Juan Carranco kick), 1 play, 24 yards, 0:06	0–42
2	5:23	Houston Baptist	Taylo Thompson 52 yard interception return (Travis Shinn kick), 2 plays, 0 yards, 0:45	7–42
2	2:16	Lamar	Kad Harrington 14 yard run (Carranco, Juan kick), 8 plays, 68 yards, 3:07	7–49
2	0:46	Lamar	DaQuan Stewart 56 yard interception return (Juan Carranco kick blocked), 3 plays, 5 yards, 1:30	7–55
2	0:27	Lamar	Mark Roberts 26 yard pass from Caleb Berry (Juan Carranco kick), 2 plays, 26 yards, 0:11	7–62
3	6:50	Lamar	Brent Salenga 1 yard run (Juan Carranco kick), 8 plays, 70 yards, 4:50	7–69
3	0:44	Lamar	Juan Carranco 43 yard field goal, 5 plays, 28 yards, 2:46	7–72
4	0:00	Houston Baptist	Jacki Robinson 1 yard run (Travis Shinn kick), 14 plays, 80 yards, 6:06	14–72

=== at Southeastern Louisiana ===
Houston Baptist at Southeastern Louisiana

Team	1	2	3	4	Total
Huskies	7	0	0	0	7
• #14 Lions	14	28	20	14	76

- Date: November 8
- Location: Strawberry Stadium
  Hammond, LA
- Game start: 3:00 PM CST
- Elapsed time: 2:48
- Game attendance: 4,158
- Game weather: 68 °F (20 °C) • N 6 mph (9.7 km/h) • Clear
- Referee: Ross Smith
- Television network: Southeastern Channel

Scoring summary
1	14:39	Southeastern Louisiana	Jeff Smiley 37 yard pass from Bryan Bennett (Ryan Adams kick), 1 play, 37 yards, 0:21	0–7
1	10:24	Southeastern Louisiana	Devante Scott 38 yard pass from Bryan Bennett (Ryan Adams kick), 7 plays, 97 yards, 2:37	0–14
1	2:34	Houston Baptist	Larry Day 1 yard run (Travis Shinn kick), 11 plays, 65 yards, 3:48	7–14
2	11:12	Southeastern Louisiana	Kody Sutton 6 yard run (Ryan Adams kick), 14 plays, 79 yards, 6:16	7–21
2	7:34	Southeastern Louisiana	Rasheed Harrell 1 yard run (Ryan Adams kick), 2 plays, 51 yards, 0:14	7–28
2	2:27	Southeastern Louisiana	Chris Malott 35 yard pass from Jordan Barnett (Ryan Adams kick), 5 plays, 70 yards, 2:06	7–35
2	0:40	Southeastern Louisiana	Jeff Smiley 15 yard pass from Jordan Barnett (Ryan Adams Kick), 4 plays, 54 yards, 0:36	7–42
3	10:02	Southeastern Louisiana	Chris Malott 47 yard pass from Jordan Barnett (Ryan Adams kick), 3 plays, 65 yards, 1:02	7–49
3	5:54	Southeastern Louisiana	Kody Sutton 3 yard run (Ryan Adams PAT blocked), 5 plays, 85 yards, 2:30	7–56
3	2:40	Southeastern Louisiana	Kody Sutton 52 yard run (Ryan Adams kick), 2 plays, 83 yards, 1:03	7–63
4	13:35	Southeastern Louisiana	D'Shaie Landor 3 yard run (Ryan Adams kick), 7 plays, 38 yards, 2:17	7–70
4	7:59	Southeastern Louisiana	D'Shaie Landor 5 yard run (Tim Callian Kick), 6 plays, 50 yards, 3:25	7–76

=== Sam Houston State ===
Sam Houston State at Houston Baptist

Team	1	2	3	4	Total
• Bearkats	35	20	7	14	76
Huskies	0	0	0	0	0

- Date: November 15
- Location: HBU Stadium
  Houston, TX
- Game start: 3:00 pm CST
- Elapsed time: 2:38
- Game attendance: 3,124
- Game weather: 51 °F (11 °C) • NE 12 mph (19 km/h) • Overcast
- Referee: Ross Smith
- TV announcers (FSSW): Brett Dolan & Jeff Power

Scoring summary
1	14:19	Sam Houston State	Gerald Thomas 38 yard pass from Jared Johnson (Luc Swimberghe kick), 2 plays, 43 yards, 0:41	0–7
1	11:39	Sam Houston State	Jalen Overstreet 38 yard run (Luc Swimberghe kick), 6 plays, 83 yards, 1:30	0–14
1	7:48	Sam Houston State	LaDarius Brown 12 yard pass from Jared Johnson (Luc Swimberghe kick), 5 plays, 25 yards, 1:22	0–21
1	6:51	Sam Houston State	Jalen Overstreet 48 yard run (Luc Swimberghe kick), 1 play, 48 yards, 0:12	0–28
1	3:55	Sam Houston State	Donavan Williams 80 yard run (Luc Swimberghe kick), 1 play, 80 yards, 0:15	0–35
2	13:18	Sam Houston State	Luc Swimberghe 35 yard field goal, 11 plays, 56 yards, 3:16	0–38
2	6:50	Sam Houston State	Donavan Williams 24 yard run (Luc Swimberghe kick), 10 plays, 96 yards, 3:31	0–45
2	2:50	Sam Houston State	Luc Swimberghe 27 yard field goal, 8 plays, 58 yards, 2:44	0–48
2	0:32	Sam Houston State	Donavan Williams 56 yard run (Luc Swimberghe kick), 2 plays, 70 yards, 0:23	0–55
3	5:25	Sam Houston State	Cory Idlebird 2 yard run (Luc Swimberghe kick), 7 plays, 61 yards, 2:36	0–62
4	14:53	Sam Houston State	De'Chaar Greer 11 yard run (Luc Swimberghe kick), 6 plays, 55 yards, 2:13	0–69
4	6:00	Sam Houston State	Cory Idlebird 59 yard run (Luc Swimberghe kick), 8 plays, 80 yards, 4:41	0–76
