= 2014 Abilene Christian Wildcats football team =

American college football season

2014 Abilene Christian Wildcats football
- Conference: Southland Conference
- Record: 6–6 (4–4 Southland)
- Head coach: Ken Collums (3rd season)
- Offensive coordinator: Nathan Young (2nd season)
- Offensive scheme: Spread
- Defensive coordinator: Darian Dulin (3rd season)
- Base defense: 3–4
- Home stadium: Shotwell Stadium

2014 Southland Conference football standings
	Conf.			Overall
Team	W		L	W		L
No. 6 Sam Houston St +^	7	–	1	11	–	5
No. 14 SE Louisiana +^	7	–	1	9	–	4
Lamar	5	–	3	8	–	4
Stephen F. Austin ^	5	–	3	8	–	5
Central Arkansas	5	–	3	6	–	6
McNeese State	4	–	4	6	–	5
Abilene Christian *	4	–	4	6	–	6
Northwestern State	4	–	4	6	–	6
Incarnate Word *	2	–	6	2	–	9
Houston Baptist	1	–	7	2	–	9
Nicholls State	0	–	8	0	–	12
+ – Conference co-champions; ^ – FCS playoff participant; * – ineligible for FCS playoffs due to transition from NCAA Division II; Rankings from The Sports Network poll

The 2014 Abilene Christian Wildcats football team represented Abilene Christian University as a member of the Southland Conference during the 2014 NCAA Division I FCS football season. Led by third-year head coach Ken Collums, the Wildcats compiled an overall record of 6–6 with a conference mark of 4–4, finishing in a three-way tie for sixth place in the Southland. This was Abilene Christian's first season in the Southland Conference and their second transition season at the NCAA Division I Football Championship Subdivision (FCS) level. The Wildcats played their home games at Shotwell Stadium in Abilene, Texas.

== Schedule ==
Date	Time	Opponent	Site	TV	Result	Attendance
August 27	6:00 pm	at Georgia State*	Georgia Dome; Atlanta, GA	ESPNU	L 37–38	10,140
September 6	6:00 pm	No. 25 Northern Arizona*	Shotwell Stadium; Abilene, TX	KTES-LP*	L 21–27	10,500
September 13	6:00 pm	at Troy*	Veterans Memorial Stadium; Troy, AL	ESPN3	W 38–35	17,320
September 20	3:05 pm	Incarnate Word	Shotwell Stadium; Abilene, TX (P4X Foundation Classic)	SLCTV	W 21–0	12,674
September 27	7:00 pm	at Houston Baptist	Husky Stadium; Houston, TX	FSSW*	W 59–14	3,823
October 4	6:00 pm	Lamar	Shotwell Stadium; Abilene, TX	KTES-LP*	L 21–24	8,913
October 11	2:00 pm	Ave Maria*^{†}	Shotwell Stadium; Abilene, TX	KTES-LP*	W 55–14	8,117
October 18	6:00 pm	at No. 11 McNeese State	Cowboy Stadium; Lake Charles, LA	ESPN3	L 20–31	14,464
October 25	3:00 pm	at Sam Houston State	Bowers Stadium; Huntsville, TX	BSN	L 21–38	7,073
November 1	2:00 pm	vs. Central Arkansas	John Clark Field; Plano, TX	FCS Central	W 52–35	8,435
November 8	2:00 pm	Northwestern State	Shotwell Stadium; Abilene, TX	KTES-LP*	L 10–34	4,800
November 15	3:00 pm	at Stephen F. Austin	Homer Bryce Stadium; Nacogdoches, TX		W 37–35	5,581
*Non-conference game; ^{†}Homecoming; Rankings from The Sports Network Poll released prior to the game; All times are in Central time

* Games aired on a tape delayed basis

== Game summaries ==
=== Georgia State ===
Abilene Christian at Georgia State

Team	1	2	3	4	Total
Wildcats	3	13	14	7	37
• Panthers	7	14	0	17	38

- Date: August 27
- Location: Georgia Dome
  Atlanta, Georgia
- Game start: 6:05 PM CST
- Elapsed time: 3:43
- Game attendance: 10,140
- Game weather: Dome
- Referee: Charles Lewis
- TV announcers (ESPNU): Ryan Ruocco & Charles Arbuckle

Scoring summary
1	8:58	ACU	25-yard field goal by Nik Grau	ACU 3–0
1	2:31	GSU	Joel Ruiz 34-yard touchdown reception from Nick Arbuckle, Wil Lutz kick good	GSU 7–3
2	12:00	GSU	Jonathan Lytle 2-yard touchdown run, Lutz kick good	GSU 14–3
2	7:31	ACU	42-yard field goal by Grau	GSU 14–6
2	3:52	ACU	Cedric Gilbert 60-yard touchdown reception from Parker McKenzie, Grau kick good	GSU 14–13
2	1:11	ACU	33-yard field goal by Grau	ACU 16–14
2	0:14	GSU	Avery Sweeting 41-yard touchdown reception from Arbuckle, Lutz kick good	GSU 21–16
3	6:27	ACU	Jamie Walker 23-yard touchdown reception from McKenzie, Grau kick good	ACU 23–21
3	1:41	ACU	Jace Hudson 24-yard touchdown reception from McKenzie, Grau kick good	ACU 30–21
4	10:42	GSU	Lynquez Blair 27-yard touchdown reception from Arbuckle, Lutz kick good	ACU 30–28
4	6:36	ACU	Cade Stone 7-yard touchdown reception from McKenzie, Grau kick good	ASU 37–28
4	4:31	GSU	Ruiz 9-yard touchdown reception from Arbuckle, Lutz kick good	ASU 37–35
4	0:04	GSU	26-yard field goal by Lutz	GCU 38–37

=== Northern Arizona ===
Northern Arizona at Abilene Christian

Team	1	2	3	4	Total
• #25 Lumberjacks	3	14	7	3	27
Wildcats	0	7	7	7	21

- Date: September 6
- Location: Shotwell Stadium
  Abilene, TX
- Game start: 6:00 PM CST
- Game attendance: 10,500
- TV announcers (KTES-LP): Grant Boone, Lance Fleming, and Matt Sloan

=== Troy ===
Abilene Christian at Troy

Team	1	2	3	4	Total
• Wildcats	7	0	21	10	38
Trojans	7	14	7	7	35

- Date: September 13
- Location: Veterans Memorial Stadium
  Troy, AL
- Game start: 6:00 PM CST
- Game attendance: 17,320
- Television network: ESPN3

=== Incarnate Word ===
Incarnate Word at Abilene Christian

Team	1	2	3	4	Total
Cardinals	0	0	0	0	0
• Wildcats	14	0	7	0	21

- Date: September 20
- Location: Shotwell Stadium
  Abilene, TX
- Game start: 3:00 PM CST
- Game attendance: 12,674
- Television network: SLCTV/KIDZ

=== Houston Baptist ===
Abilene Christian at Houston Baptist

Team	1	2	3	4	Total
• Wildcats	10	28	7	14	59
Huskies	7	7	0	0	14

- Date: September 27
- Location: HBU Stadium
  Houston, TX
- Game attendance: 3,823

=== Lamar ===
Lamar at Abilene Christian

Team	1	2	3	4	Total
• Cardinals	7	3	0	14	24
Wildcats	7	0	7	7	21

- Date: October 4
- Location: Shotwell Stadium
  Abilene, TX
- Game attendance: 8,913
- TV announcers (KTES-LP): Grant Boone, Lance Fleming, and Matt Sloan

=== Ave Maria ===
Ave Maria at Abilene Christian

Team	1	2	3	4	Total
Gyrenes	7	7	0	0	14
• Wildcats	10	21	10	14	55

- Date: October 11
- Location: Shotwell Stadium
  Abilene, TX
- Game attendance: 8,117
- TV announcers (KTES-LP): Grant Boone, Lance Fleming, and Matt Sloan

=== McNeese State ===
Abilene Christian at McNeese State

Team	1	2	3	4	Total
Wildcats	0	6	0	14	20
• #11 Cowboys	17	7	7	0	31

- Date: October 18
- Location: Cowboy Stadium
  Lake Charles, LA
- Game attendance: 14,464
- Television network: ESPN3

=== Sam Houston State ===
Abilene Christian at Sam Houston State

Team	1	2	3	4	Total
Wildcats	0	14	0	7	21
• Bearkats	7	17	7	7	38

- Date: October 25
- Location: Bowers Stadium
  Huntsville, TX
- Game start: 3:00 pm CST
- Elapsed time: 2:25
- Game attendance: 7,073
- Referee: Kevin Hassell

=== Central Arkansas ===
Central Arkansas vs. Abilene Christian

Team	1	2	3	4	Total
Bears	7	7	7	14	35
• Wildcats	21	10	7	14	52

- Date: November 1
- Location: John Clark Field
  Plano, TX
- Game start: 2:00 pm CST
- Game attendance: 8,435
- Television network: FSSW

=== Northwestern State ===
Northwestern State at Abilene Christian

Team	1	2	3	4	Total
• Demons	7	13	7	7	34
Wildcats	0	0	10	0	10

- Date: November 8
- Location: Shotwell Stadium
  Abilene, TX
- Game start: 2:00 PM CST
- Elapsed time: 2:55
- Game attendance: 4,800
- Game weather: Temp: 65 Wind: NE 16mph Weather: Clear, windy, cool
- Referee: Eddy Shelton

=== Stephen F. Austin ===
Abilene Christian at Stephen F. Austin

Team	1	2	3	4	Total
• Wildcats	10	16	8	3	37
Lumberjacks	7	14	7	7	35

- Date: November 15
- Location: Homer Bryce Stadium
  Nacogdoches, TX
- Game start: 3:00 pm CST
- Elapsed time: 3:00
- Game attendance: 5,581
- Game weather: Temp: Mid 40s (°F), Wind: 7-10 mph, Weather: Cloudy and Chilly
- Referee: Brandon Cruse

== Roster ==
2014 Abilene Christian Wildcats football team roster
Players
Coaches
Offense

Pos.	#	Name	Class
QB	2	Dallas Sealey	Fr
QB	8	Kade Munden	Fr
QB	14	Parker McKenzie	So
QB	15	Cody Ennis	Fr
QB	16	Will Weathers	Fr
QB	18	Mike Richardson	Fr
RB	22	De'Andre Brown	Fr
RB	23	Herschel Sims	Jr
RB	25	Randy Gober	Fr
RB	39	Adrian Duncan	So
RB	XX	Nathaniel Johnson	Fr
RB	XX	Jemarcus Jones	Fr
FB	19	Jonathan Parker	Sr
FB	42	Josh Hunter	Fr
FB	86	Noah Cheshier	Sr
TE	48	Liam Flowers	Fr
TE	88	Jamie Walker	Jr
TE	XX	Tyson Tindol	Fr
WR	1	Cade Stone	Jr
WR	4	Jonathan Epps	Jr
WR	6	Demarcus Thompson	Sr
WR	17	Jace Hudson	Jr
WR	32	Byron Proctor	Fr
WR	80	Monte Green-Avery	Jr
WR	82	Cedric Gilbert	Jr
WR	83	Chris Lide	Fr
WR	84	Marcus Ellis	Fr
WR	XX	Diego Hodges	Fr
WR	XX	Cody King	Fr
WR	XX	Brandon McClung	Fr
WR	XX	Hayden Smiley	So
WR	XX	Patrick Tshituka	Fr
OL	51	Austin Hisler	Fr
OL	64	Kris Thigpen	Fr
OL	68	Brady Melde	Fr
OL	70	Colton King	Fr
OL	71	Cole Baughman	Fr
OL	72	Hayden Wall	Fr
OL	74	Josh Hailey	Fr
OL	75	Chance Rieken	Fr
OL	76	Colton Carnes	Sr
OL	77	Codey Funk	So
OL	78	Logan Hoppenrath	Sr
OL	79	Riley Mayfield	Fr

Defense

Pos.	#	Name	Class
DB	3	Justin Stewart	Sr
DB	13	Terry Ausborne	Fr
DB	21	Angel Lopez	Sr
DB	24	Keith Barnett	Jr
DB	26	Damian Howard	Fr
DB	27	Quentin Bryant	Fr
DB	29	Tyler Chapa	Jr
DB	30	Quinton Baker	So
DB	31	D.J. Arnold	So
DB	38	Jamar Mack	Fr
DB	40	D.J. Johnson	So
DB	41	Quantence Walker	So
DB	XX	DeMarco Corner	Fr
DB	XX	Reese Gwin	Fr
DB	XX	Zar'rian Parker	Fr
DE	5	Nick Richardson	Sr
DE	46	Anthony Davis	Fr
DE	47	William Moore	Jr
DE	89	Devondric Meadows	Fr
DE	91	Cameron Briscoe	So
DE	92	A.J. Tolbert	Fr
DE	94	Brandon Dornak	Sr
DL	33	Rob Boyd	Sr
DL	55	Tanner Morris	Jr
DL	69	Rishaad Wimbley	Jr
DL	90	LaMarcus Allen	Fr
DL	93	Trent Andrews	Fr
DL	95	Josh Bloom	So
DL	96	Damon Williams	Sr
DL	98	Josh Finley	Jr
DL	99	Travaughn Moore	Fr
DL	XX	Jaylen Hill	So
DL	XX	Cody Wimpee	Fr
LB	7	Lynn Grady	Sr
LB	9	Travis Tarver	Jr
LB	12	Bryson Gates	Fr
LB	20	Justin Stephens	Sr
LB	34	Sam Denmark	Fr
LB	35	Myles Solsberry	Fr
LB	37	Dylan Douglass	Fr
LB	45	Blake Rudd	Sr
LB	49	Chris Summers	Jr
LB	52	Chuck Oputa	Jr
LB	53	Dezmond Powers	So
LB	56	Gavin Burford	Fr
LB	XX	Robert Alaniz	Fr
LB	XX	Patrick Carreon	Fr
LB	XX	Sam Lawlis	Jr

Special teams

Pos.	#	Name	Class
DS	67	Spencer Feasel	So
DS	73	Hayden Brodowsky	So
P	81	Ben Hynds	Sr
P	85	Austin Kilcullen	So
K	43	Nik Grau	So

Head coach

- Ken Collums (Central Arkansas)

Coordinators/assistant coaches

- Darian Dulin (Sam Houston State)
  Defensive coordinator/defensive backs
- Nathan Young (Abilene Christian)
  Offensive coordinator/running backs
- Sam Collins (Abilene Christian)
  Offensive line
- Cody Moore (Oklahoma Panhandle State)
  Defensive line
- Kendrick Holloway (Abilene Christian)
  Wide receivers
- Mark Ribaudo (Arizona)
  Linebackers
- Nick Smith (Abilene Christian)
  Cornerbacks
- Steven Thrash (Texas Lutheran)
  Tight ends
- Kregg Pierson (Abilene Christian)
  Academics

Legend

- (C) Team captain
- (S) Suspended
- (I) Ineligible
- Injured
- Redshirt

Roster
