= 2014 Central Arkansas Bears football team =

American college football season

2014 Central Arkansas Bears football
- Conference: Southland Conference
- Record: 6–6 (5–3 Southland)
- Head coach: Steve Campbell (1st season)
- Offensive coordinator: Nathan Brown (1st season)
- Offensive scheme: Spread
- Defensive coordinator: Greg Stewart (1st season)
- Base defense: 4–3
- Home stadium: Estes Stadium

2014 Southland Conference football standings
	Conf.			Overall
Team	W		L	W		L
No. 6 Sam Houston St +^	7	–	1	11	–	5
No. 14 SE Louisiana +^	7	–	1	9	–	4
Lamar	5	–	3	8	–	4
Stephen F. Austin ^	5	–	3	8	–	5
Central Arkansas	5	–	3	6	–	6
McNeese State	4	–	4	6	–	5
Abilene Christian *	4	–	4	6	–	6
Northwestern State	4	–	4	6	–	6
Incarnate Word *	2	–	6	2	–	9
Houston Baptist	1	–	7	2	–	9
Nicholls State	0	–	8	0	–	12
+ – Conference co-champions; ^ – FCS playoff participant; * – ineligible for FCS playoffs due to transition from NCAA Division II; Rankings from The Sports Network poll

The 2014 Central Arkansas Bears football team represented the University of Central Arkansas in the 2014 NCAA Division I FCS football season. The Bears were led by first-year head coach Steve Campbell and played their home games at Estes Stadium. They are a member of the Southland Conference. The Bears finished the season 6–6 overall and 5–3 in conference play to finish in a three way tie for third place.

Central Arkansas defeated Northwestern State 58–35 in their homecoming game.

== Schedule ==
Date	Time	Opponent	Site	TV	Result	Attendance
August 30	6:00 pm	at Texas Tech*	Jones AT&T Stadium; Lubbock, TX	FSSW+	L 35–42	60,778
September 6	6:00 pm	UT Martin*	Estes Stadium; Conway, AR		W 26–24	10,727
September 13	2:30 pm	at No. 17 Montana State*	Bobcat Stadium; Bozeman, MT	ESPN3	L 33–43	17,777
September 20	6:00 pm	Missouri State*	Estes Stadium; Conway, AR		L 31–33	10,027
September 27	3:00 pm	Nicholls State	Estes Stadium; Conway, AR	SLCTV	W 52–18	9,748
October 4	6:00 pm	at Stephen F. Austin	Homer Bryce Stadium; Nacogdoches, TX	ESPN3	W 49–39	10,012
October 11	6:00 pm	Houston Baptist	Estes Stadium; Conway, AR		W 70–0	4,726
October 18	7:00 pm	at No. 8 Southeastern Louisiana	Strawberry Stadium; Hammond, LA		L 24–41	8,766
October 25	6:00 pm	Northwestern State^{†}	Estes Stadium; Conway, AR		W 58–35	11,163
November 1	2:00 pm	vs. Abilene Christian	John Clark Field; Plano, TX	FCS	L 35–52	8,435
November 8	3:00 pm	Lamar	Estes Stadium; Conway, AR	SLCTV	W 44–41 ^{OT}	5,427
November 22	3:00 pm	at No. 23 Sam Houston State	Bowers Stadium; Huntsville, TX	SLCTV	L 31–38	5,717
*Non-conference game; ^{†}Homecoming; Rankings from The Sports Network Poll released prior to the game; All times are in Central time
