= 2014 Nicholls State Colonels football team =

American college football season

2014 Nicholls State Colonels football
- Conference: Southland Conference
- Record: 0–12 (0–8 Southland)
- Head coach: Charlie Stubbs (5th season; first 3 games); Steve Axman (interim; remainder of season)
- Offensive scheme: Multiple pro-style
- Defensive coordinator: Steve Adams (1st season)
- Base defense: 3–4
- Home stadium: John L. Guidry Stadium

2014 Southland Conference football standings
	Conf.			Overall
Team	W		L	W		L
No. 6 Sam Houston St +^	7	–	1	11	–	5
No. 14 SE Louisiana +^	7	–	1	9	–	4
Lamar	5	–	3	8	–	4
Stephen F. Austin ^	5	–	3	8	–	5
Central Arkansas	5	–	3	6	–	6
McNeese State	4	–	4	6	–	5
Abilene Christian *	4	–	4	6	–	6
Northwestern State	4	–	4	6	–	6
Incarnate Word *	2	–	6	2	–	9
Houston Baptist	1	–	7	2	–	9
Nicholls State	0	–	8	0	–	12
+ – Conference co-champions; ^ – FCS playoff participant; * – ineligible for FCS playoffs due to transition from NCAA Division II; Rankings from The Sports Network poll

The 2014 Nicholls State Colonels football team represented Nicholls State University as a member of the Southland Conference during the 2014 NCAA Division I FCS football season. The Colonels were led by fifth-year head coach Charlie Stubbs for the first three games of the season and then by interim head coach Steve Axman for the final nine. Nicholls State compiled an overall record of 0–12 with a mark of 0–8 in conference play, placing last out of 11 teams in the Southland. The team played home games at John L. Guidry Stadium in Thibodaux, Louisiana.

After opening the season 0–3, Stubbs resigned on September 14, citing health issues for his decision. Three days later, the school named former Northern Arizona head coach Steve Axman as interim head coach for the remainder of the season. On November 21, following the season's conclusion, Tim Rebowe was named the tenth head football coach for Nicholls State. Rebowe had been an assistant coach at the University of Louisiana–Lafayette for the previous 11 seasons and assistant coach at Nicholls State from 1995 to 2000.

== Schedule ==
Date	Time	Opponent	Site	TV	Result	Attendance
August 30	1:00 pm	at Air Force*	Falcon Stadium; Colorado Springs, CO	ESPN3	L 16–44	32,038
September 6	3:00 pm	at Arkansas*	Donald W. Reynolds Razorback Stadium; Fayetteville, AR	SECN	L 7–73	63,108
September 13	6:00 pm	No. 7 (Div. II) Henderson State*	John L. Guidry Stadium; Thibodaux, LA	CAA	L 10–27	5,821
September 20	2:30 pm	at North Texas*	Apogee Stadium; Denton, TX	ASN	L 3–77	21,323
September 27	3:00 pm	at Central Arkansas	Estes Stadium; Conway, AR	SLCTV	L 18–52	9,748
October 4	6:00 pm	at No. 5 McNeese State	Cowboy Stadium; Lake Charles, LA		L 3–45	11,744
October 11	6:00 pm	Stephen F. Austin	John L. Guidry Stadium; Thibodaux, LA	CAA	L 20–42	5,001
October 18	3:00 pm	Lamar	John L. Guidry Stadium; Thibodaux, LA	CAA	L 21–63	5,103
October 25	7:00 pm	at Houston Baptist	Husky Stadium; Houston, TX	ESPN3	L 21–31	3,386
November 1	6:00 pm	Incarnate Word^{†}	John L. Guidry Stadium; Thibodaux, LA	CAA	L 20–38	5,002
November 15	6:00 pm	at Northwestern State	Harry Turpin Stadium; Natchitoches, LA (NSU Challenge)		L 21–48	4,189
November 20	6:00 pm	No. 10 Southeastern Louisiana	John L. Guidry Stadium; Thibodaux, LA (River Bell Classic)	WHNO	L 3–62	5,103
*Non-conference game; ^{†}Homecoming; Rankings from The Sports Network Poll released prior to the game; All times are in Central time

== Game summaries ==
=== At Air Force ===
	1	2	3	4	Total
Colonels	6	3	0	7	16
Falcons	9	14	14	7	44

Statistics	NICH	AFA
First downs	18	27
Total yards	263	558
Rushing yards	63	539
Passing yards	200	19
Turnovers	0	0
Time of possession	28:52	31:08

Team	Category	Player	Statistics
Nicholls State	Passing	Kalen Henderson	12/25, 136 yards
Nicholls State	Rushing	Michael Henry	8 rushes, 23 yards
Nicholls State	Receiving	Darryl Watson	4 receptions, 66 yards, TD
Air Force	Passing	Kale Pearson	3/6, 19 yards
Air Force	Rushing	Jacobi Owens	23 rushes, 233 yards
Air Force	Receiving	Jalen Rowell	2 receptions, 13 yards

=== At Arkansas ===
	1	2	3	4	Total
Colonels	0	0	7	0	7
Razorbacks	35	21	7	10	73

Statistics	NICH	ARK
First downs	17	26
Total yards	242	684
Rushing yards	34	495
Passing yards	208	189
Turnovers	1	1
Time of possession	34:10	25:50

Team	Category	Player	Statistics
Nicholls State	Passing	Kalen Henderson	12/30, 105 yards, TD, INT
Nicholls State	Rushing	Tobias Lofton	5 rushes, 36 yards
Nicholls State	Receiving	Xavier Marcus	5 receptions, 59 yards
Arkansas	Passing	Brandon Allen	4/5, 117 yards, 4 TD
Arkansas	Rushing	Jonathan Williams	4 rushes, 143 yards, TD
Arkansas	Receiving	Jared Cornelius	2 receptions, 51 yards, TD

=== No. 7 (Div. II) Henderson State ===
	1	2	3	4	Total
No. 7 (Div. II) Reddies	8	7	3	9	27
Colonels	0	0	7	3	10

Statistics	HEN	NICH
First downs	25	18
Total yards	381	252
Rushing yards	212	88
Passing yards	169	164
Turnovers	1	2
Time of possession	29:07	30:53

Team	Category	Player	Statistics
Henderson State	Passing	Kevin Rodgers	23/35, 169 yards, TD, INT
Henderson State	Rushing	Jaquan Cole	15 rushes, 76 yards, TD
Henderson State	Receiving	Mark Czaus	7 receptions, 49 yards, TD
Nicholls State	Passing	Kalen Henderson	20/36, 147 yards
Nicholls State	Rushing	Kalen Henderson	14 rushes, 58 yards
Nicholls State	Receiving	Reggie Wilson	5 receptions, 48 yards

=== At North Texas ===
	1	2	3	4	Total
Colonels	3	0	0	0	3
Mean Green	21	28	21	7	77

Statistics	NICH	UNT
First downs	14	20
Total yards	244	526
Rushing yards	78	324
Passing yards	166	202
Turnovers	3	1
Time of possession	39:06	20:54

Team	Category	Player	Statistics
Nicholls State	Passing	Beaux Hebert	10/16, 116 yards, INT
Nicholls State	Rushing	Michael Henry	19 rushes, 65 yards
Nicholls State	Receiving	Demon Bolt	4 receptions, 38 yards
North Texas	Passing	Dajon Williams	11/14, 176 yards, 3 TD
North Texas	Rushing	Dajon Williams	4 rushes, 68 yards, 2 TD
North Texas	Receiving	Carlos Harris	5 receptions, 69 yards, TD

=== At Central Arkansas ===
	1	2	3	4	Total
Colonels	6	0	6	6	18
Bears	7	17	21	7	52

Statistics	NICH	UCA
First downs	18	28
Total yards	240	487
Rushing yards	127	220
Passing yards	113	267
Turnovers	3	3
Time of possession	28:35	31:25

Team	Category	Player	Statistics
Nicholls State	Passing	Kalen Henderson	5/11, 68 yards
Nicholls State	Rushing	Michael Henry	21 rushes, 142 yards
Nicholls State	Receiving	Demon Bolt	2 receptions, 40 yards
Central Arkansas	Passing	Ryan Howard	15/19, 114 yards, 2 TD, 2 INT
Central Arkansas	Rushing	Blake Veasley	9 rushes, 58 yards, TD
Central Arkansas	Receiving	Courtney Whitehead	4 receptions, 50 yards, TD

=== At No. 5 McNeese State ===
	1	2	3	4	Total
Colonels	0	0	3	0	3
No. 5 Cowboys	7	17	14	7	45

Statistics	NICH	MCN
First downs	14	33
Total yards	257	567
Rushing yards	70	325
Passing yards	187	242
Turnovers	2	0
Time of possession	27:13	32:47

Team	Category	Player	Statistics
Nicholls State	Passing	Kalen Henderson	6/10, 99 yards
Nicholls State	Rushing	Michael Henry	9 rushes, 81 yards
Nicholls State	Receiving	Demon Bolt	3 receptions, 105 yards
McNeese State	Passing	Tyler Bolfing	10/15, 166 yards, TD
McNeese State	Rushing	Daniel Sams	13 rushes, 135 yards
McNeese State	Receiving	Jereon McGilvery	3 receptions, 65 yards

=== Stephen F. Austin ===
	1	2	3	4	Total
Lumberjacks	7	0	21	14	42
Colonels	0	7	13	0	20

Statistics	SFA	NICH
First downs	31	18
Total yards	599	381
Rushing yards	308	258
Passing yards	291	123
Turnovers	1	1
Time of possession	34:25	25:35

Team	Category	Player	Statistics
Stephen F. Austin	Passing	Zach Conque	29/47, 291 yards, INT
Stephen F. Austin	Rushing	Gus Johnson	19 rushes, 202 yards, 3 TD
Stephen F. Austin	Receiving	Tyler Boyd	11 receptions, 69 yards
Nicholls State	Passing	Kalen Henderson	12/28, 123 yards
Nicholls State	Rushing	Michael Henry	19 rushes, 136 yards, 2 TD
Nicholls State	Receiving	Dorian Durald	1 reception, 38 yards

=== Lamar ===
	1	2	3	4	Total
Cardinals	14	28	14	7	63
Colonels	0	7	7	7	21

Statistics	LAM	NICH
First downs	33	13
Total yards	691	155
Rushing yards	362	37
Passing yards	329	118
Turnovers	3	1
Time of possession	36:10	23:50

Team	Category	Player	Statistics
Lamar	Passing	Caleb Berry	27/32, 330 yards, 2 TD, 2 INT
Lamar	Rushing	Kade Harrington	18 rushes, 123 yards, 4 TD
Lamar	Receiving	Mark Roberts	7 receptions, 148 yards, TD
Nicholls State	Passing	Kalen Henderson	7/18, 58 yards, TD, INT
Nicholls State	Rushing	Michael Henry	11 rushes, 51 yards
Nicholls State	Receiving	Michael Henry	1 reception, 32 yards

=== At Houston Baptist ===
	1	2	3	4	Total
Colonels	7	0	14	0	21
Huskies	7	10	0	14	31

Statistics	NICH	HBU
First downs	20	26
Total yards	373	393
Rushing yards	187	266
Passing yards	186	127
Turnovers	2	0
Time of possession	23:08	36:52

Team	Category	Player	Statistics
Nicholls State	Passing	Beaux Hebert	17/28, 186 yards, TD, INT
Nicholls State	Rushing	Michael Henry	20 rushes, 90 yards, 2 TD
Nicholls State	Receiving	Desmon Bolt	3 receptions, 73 yards, TD
Houston Baptist	Passing	Jonathan Fleming	10/20, 127 yards, 2 TD
Houston Baptist	Rushing	B. J. Kelly	29 rushes, 153 yards, TD
Houston Baptist	Receiving	Kenneth Bibbins	2 receptions, 57 yards, TD

=== Incarnate Word ===
	1	2	3	4	Total
Cardinals	10	14	7	7	38
Colonels	0	14	0	6	20

Statistics	UIW	NICH
First downs	24	15
Total yards	463	351
Rushing yards	203	142
Passing yards	260	209
Turnovers	3	0
Time of possession	35:02	24:58

Team	Category	Player	Statistics
Incarnate Word	Passing	Jordan Scelfo	16/30, 260 yards, 2 TD, 2 INT
Incarnate Word	Rushing	Junior Sessions	19 rushes, 89 yards, 2 TD
Incarnate Word	Receiving	Cole Wick	4 receptions, 116 yards, TD
Nicholls State	Passing	Beaux Hebert	16/29, 209 yards, TD
Nicholls State	Rushing	Michael Henry	20 rushes, 96 yards, TD
Nicholls State	Receiving	Desmon Bolt	3 receptions, 70 yards

=== At Northwestern State ===
	1	2	3	4	Total
Colonels	7	0	7	7	21
Demons	14	14	14	6	48

Statistics	NICH	NWST
First downs	24	26
Total yards	315	479
Rushing yards	163	300
Passing yards	152	179
Turnovers	2	1
Time of possession	34:01	25:59

Team	Category	Player	Statistics
Nicholls State	Passing	Beaux Hebert	14/23, 113 yards, TD, INT
Nicholls State	Rushing	Michael Henry	29 rushes, 146 yards, TD
Nicholls State	Receiving	Xavier Marcus	2 receptions, 37 yards
Northwestern State	Passing	Zach Adkins	17/20, 180 yards, 5 TD
Northwestern State	Rushing	Daniel Taylor	11 rushes, 80 yards
Northwestern State	Receiving	Cody Jones	4 receptions, 68 yards, 2 TD

=== No. 10 Southeastern Louisiana ===
	1	2	3	4	Total
No. 10 Lions	7	20	21	14	62
Colonels	3	0	0	0	3

Statistics	SELA	NICH
First downs	25	16
Total yards	633	279
Rushing yards	313	122
Passing yards	320	157
Turnovers	0	2
Time of possession	30:25	29:35

Team	Category	Player	Statistics
Southeastern Louisiana	Passing	Jordan Barnett	12/19, 193 yards, 2 TD
Southeastern Louisiana	Rushing	Marquis Hayes	6 rushes, 119 yards, TD
Southeastern Louisiana	Receiving	Devante Scott	7 receptions, 196 yards, TD
Nicholls State	Passing	Beaux Hebert	4/12, 100 yards
Nicholls State	Rushing	Michael Henry	27 rushes, 118 yards
Nicholls State	Receiving	Desmon Bolt	3 receptions, 80 yards
