= 2014 Northwestern State Demons football team =

American college football season

2014 Northwestern State Demons football
- Conference: Southland Conference
- Record: 6–6 (4–4 Southland)
- Head coach: Jay Thomas (2nd season)
- Offensive coordinator: Ben Norton (1st season)
- Defensive coordinator: Mike Lucas (1st season)
- Home stadium: Harry Turpin Stadium

2014 Southland Conference football standings
	Conf.			Overall
Team	W		L	W		L
No. 6 Sam Houston St +^	7	–	1	11	–	5
No. 14 SE Louisiana +^	7	–	1	9	–	4
Lamar	5	–	3	8	–	4
Stephen F. Austin ^	5	–	3	8	–	5
Central Arkansas	5	–	3	6	–	6
McNeese State	4	–	4	6	–	5
Abilene Christian *	4	–	4	6	–	6
Northwestern State	4	–	4	6	–	6
Incarnate Word *	2	–	6	2	–	9
Houston Baptist	1	–	7	2	–	9
Nicholls State	0	–	8	0	–	12
+ – Conference co-champions; ^ – FCS playoff participant; * – ineligible for FCS playoffs due to transition from NCAA Division II; Rankings from The Sports Network poll

The 2014 Northwestern State Demons football team represented Northwestern State University as a member of the Southland Conference during the 2014 NCAA Division I FCS football season. Led by second-year head coach Jay Thomas, the Demons compiled an overall record of 6–6 with a mark of 4–4 in conference play, placing in a three-way tie for sixth in the Southland. Northwestern State played home games at Harry Turpin Stadium in Natchitoches, Louisiana.

== Schedule ==
Date	Time	Opponent	Site	TV	Result	Attendance
August 28	6:00 pm	Missouri State*	Harry Turpin Stadium; Natchitoches, LA	DemonTV	L 27–34	9,284
September 6	6:30 pm	at No. 10 (FBS) Baylor*	McLane Stadium; Waco, TX	FSSW+	L 6–70	45,034
September 13	6:00 pm	at Southern*	Ace W. Mumford Stadium; Baton Rouge, LA	CST	W 51–27	15,011
September 20	6:00 pm	at Louisiana Tech*	Joe Aillet Stadium; Ruston, LA		W 30–27	26,004
October 4	3:00 pm	at No. 11 Southeastern Louisiana	Strawberry Stadium; Hammond, LA (rivalry)	SLCTV	L 22–30	4,165
October 11	6:00 pm	Incarnate Word^{†}	Harry Turpin Stadium; Natchitoches, LA	ESPN3	W 49–12	8,931
October 18	3:00 pm	No. 24 Sam Houston State	Harry Turpin Stadium; Natchitoches, LA	SLCTV	W 31–27	7,895
October 25	3:00 pm	at Central Arkansas	Estes Stadium; Conway, AR		L 35–58	11,163
November 1	6:00 pm	No. 9 McNeese State	Harry Turpin Stadium; Natchitoches, LA (rivalry)	DTV	L 28–35	9,178
November 8	2:00 pm	at Abilene Christian	Shotwell Stadium; Abilene, TX		W 34–10	4,800
November 15	6:00 pm	Nicholls State	Harry Turpin Stadium; Natchitoches, LA (NSU Challenge)	DTV	W 48–21	4,189
November 22	3:00 pm	at Stephen F. Austin	Homer Bryce Stadium; Nacogdoches, TX (Chief Caddo)		L 24–27	4,810
*Non-conference game; ^{†}Homecoming; Rankings from The Sports Network Poll released prior to the game; All times are in Central time

== Game summaries ==
=== Missouri State ===
Missouri State @ Northwestern State

Team	1	2	3	4	Total
• Bears	0	7	7	20	34
Demons	10	14	0	3	27

- Date: August 28
- Location: Harry Turpin Stadium
  Natchitoches, LA
- Game start: 6:00 PM CDT
- Game attendance: 9,284

In their first game of the season, the Demons lost, 34–27 to the Missouri State Bears.

=== @ Baylor ===
Northwestern State @ Baylor

Team	1	2	3	4	Total
Demons	0	3	3	0	6
• #10 Bears	28	21	7	14	70

- Date: September 6
- Location: McLane Stadium
  Waco, TX
- Game start: 6:30 PM CDT
- Game attendance: 45,034
- Television network: FSSW+

In their second game of the season, the Demons lost, 70–6 to the Baylor Bears.

=== @ Southern ===
Northwestern State @ Southern

Team	1	2	3	4	Total
• Demons	17	17	14	3	51
Jaguars	7	0	14	6	27

- Date: September 13
- Location: Ace W. Mumford Stadium
  Baton Rouge, LA
- Game start: 6:00 PM CDT
- Game attendance: 15,011
- Television network: CST

In their third game of the season, the Demons won, 51–27 over the Southern Jaguars.

=== @ Louisiana Tech ===
Northwestern State @ Louisiana Tech

Team	1	2	3	4	Total
• Demons	0	3	7	20	30
Bulldogs	10	3	7	7	27

- Date: September 20
- Location: Joe Aillet Stadium
  Ruston, LA
- Game start: TBA CDT
- Game attendance: 26,004

In their fourth game of the season, the Demons won, 30–27 over the Louisiana Tech Bulldogs.

=== @ Southeastern Louisiana ===
Northwestern State @ Southeastern Louisiana

Team	1	2	3	4	Total
Demons	0	0	8	14	22
• #11 Lions	0	6	17	7	30

- Date: October 4
- Location: Strawberry Stadium
  Hammond, LA
- Game start: 3:00 PM CDT
- Game attendance: 4,165
- Television network: SLCTV

In their fifth game of the season, the Demons lost, 30–22 to the Southeastern Louisiana Lions.

=== Incarnate Word ===
Incarnate Word @ Northwestern State

Team	1	2	3	4	Total
Cardinals	0	3	3	6	12
• Demons	7	28	14	0	49

- Date: October 11
- Location: Harry Turpin Stadium
  Natchitoches, LA
- Game start: 6:00 PM CDT
- Game attendance: 8,931
- Television network: ESPN3

In their sixth game of the season, the Demons won, 49–12 over the Incarnate Word Cardinals.

=== Sam Houston State ===
Sam Houston State @ Northwestern State

Team	1	2	3	4	Total
#24 Bearkats	14	7	0	6	27
• Demons	7	14	0	10	31

- Date: October 18
- Location: Harry Turpin Stadium
  Natchitoches, LA
- Game start: 3:00 PM CDT
- Game attendance: 7,895
- Television network: SLCTV

In their seventh game of the season, the Demons won, 31–27 over the Sam Houston State Bearkats.

=== @ Central Arkansas ===
Northwestern State @ Central Arkansas

Team	1	2	3	4	Total
Demons	14	7	0	14	35
• Bears	21	16	14	7	58

- Date: October 25
- Location: Estes Stadium
  Conway, AR
- Game start: 3:00 PM CDT
- Game attendance: 11,163

In their eighth game of the season, the Demons lost, 58–35 to the Central Arkansas Bears.

=== McNeese State ===
McNeese State @ Northwestern State

Team	1	2	3	4	Total
• #9 Cowboys	21	14	0	0	35
Demons	0	3	3	22	28

- Date: November 1
- Location: Harry Turpin Stadium
  Natchitoches, LA
- Game start: 6:00 PM CDT
- Game attendance: 9,178
- Television network: DTV

In their ninth game of the season, the Demons lost, 35–28 to the McNeese State Cowboys.

=== @ Abilene Christian ===
Northwestern State @ Abilene Christian

Team	1	2	3	4	Total
• Demons	7	13	7	7	34
Wildcats	0	0	10	0	10

- Date: November 8
- Location: Shotwell Stadium
  Abilene, TX
- Game start: 2:00 PM CST
- Elapsed time: 2:55
- Game attendance: 4,800
- Game weather: Temp: 65 Wind: NE 16mph Weather: Clear, windy, cool
- Referee: Eddy Shelton

In their tenth game of the season, the Demons won, 34–10 over the Abilene Christian Wildcats.

=== Nicholls State ===
Nicholls State @ Northwestern State

Team	1	2	3	4	Total
Colonels	7	0	7	7	21
• Demons	14	14	14	6	48

- Date: November 15
- Location: Harry Turpin Stadium
  Natchitoches, LA
- Game start: 6:00 PM CST
- Elapsed time: 2:44
- Game attendance: 4,189
- Game weather: Temp: 47, Wind: 5 ESE, Weather: Cloudy and Chilly
- Referee: David Alvarez
- Television network: DTV

In their eleventh game of the season, the Demons won, 48–21 over the Nicholls State Colonels.

=== @ Stephen F. Austin ===
Northwestern State @ Stephen F. Austin

Team	1	2	3	4	Total
Demons	0	14	0	10	24
• Lumberjacks	3	7	7	10	27

- Date: November 22
- Location: Homer Bryce Stadium
  Nacogdoches, TX
- Game start: 3:00 PM CST
- Game attendance: 4,810

In their twelfth game of the season, the Demons lost, 27–24 to the Stephen F. Austin Lumberjacks.
