= 2014 Stephen F. Austin Lumberjacks football team =

American college football season

2014 Stephen F. Austin Lumberjacks football

FCS Playoffs First Round, L 10–44vs. Northern Iowa
- Conference: Southland Conference
- Record: 8–5 (5–3 Southland)
- Head coach: Clint Conque (1st season)
- Offensive coordinator: Matt Kubik (1st season)
- Defensive coordinator: Matt Williamson (1st season)
- Home stadium: Homer Bryce Stadium

2014 Southland Conference football standings
	Conf.			Overall
Team	W		L	W		L
No. 6 Sam Houston St +^	7	–	1	11	–	5
No. 14 SE Louisiana +^	7	–	1	9	–	4
Lamar	5	–	3	8	–	4
Stephen F. Austin ^	5	–	3	8	–	5
Central Arkansas	5	–	3	6	–	6
McNeese State	4	–	4	6	–	5
Abilene Christian *	4	–	4	6	–	6
Northwestern State	4	–	4	6	–	6
Incarnate Word *	2	–	6	2	–	9
Houston Baptist	1	–	7	2	–	9
Nicholls State	0	–	8	0	–	12
+ – Conference co-champions; ^ – FCS playoff participant; * – ineligible for FCS playoffs due to transition from NCAA Division II; Rankings from The Sports Network poll

The 2014 Stephen F. Austin Lumberjacks football team represented Stephen F. Austin State University in the 2014 NCAA Division I FCS football season. The Lumberjacks were led by first year head coach Clint Conque and played their home games at Homer Bryce Stadium. They are members of the Southland Conference. The Lumberjacks finished the season 8–5 overall and 5–3 in conference play to finish in a tie for third place. They received an at-large bid to the FCS Playoffs where they lost in the first round playoff to Northern Iowa 10–44.

== Schedule ==
Date	Time	Opponent	Rank	Site	TV	Result	Attendance
August 30	6:00 pm	at No. 20 (FBS) Kansas State*		Bill Snyder Family Football Stadium; Manhattan, KS	K-State TV	L 16–55	52,830
September 6	6:00 pm	Incarnate Word*		Homer Bryce Stadium; Nacogdoches, TX	SFAAA	W 38–3	8,103
September 13	6:00 pm	Texas A&M–Commerce*		Homer Bryce Stadium; Nacogdoches, TX	SFAAA	W 38–17	7,821
September 20	6:00 pm	Weber State*		Homer Bryce Stadium; Nacogdoches, TX	SFAAA	W 35–20	11,816
October 4	6:00 pm	Central Arkansas		Homer Bryce Stadium; Nacogdoches, TX	ESPN3	L 39–49	10,012
October 11	6:00 pm	at Nicholls State		John L. Guidry Stadium; Thibodaux, LA	CSNH	W 42–20	5,001
October 18	7:00 pm	at Houston Baptist		Husky Stadium; Houston, TX	FSSW*	W 59–27	3,158
October 25	3:00 pm	No. 8 Southeastern Louisiana^{†}		Homer Bryce Stadium; Nacogdoches, TX	CSNH	W 27–17	13,881
November 1	3:00 pm	vs. Sam Houston State	No. 24	Reliant Stadium; Houston, TX (Battle of the Piney Woods)	CSNH	L 28–42	26,788
November 8	6:00 pm	at No. 6 McNeese State		Cowboy Stadium; Lake Charles, LA		W 31–16	10,069
November 15	3:00 pm	Abilene Christian		Homer Bryce Stadium; Nacogdoches, TX	SFAAA	L 35–37	5,581
November 22	3:00 pm	Northwestern State		Homer Bryce Stadium; Nacogdoches, TX (Chief Caddo)	SFAAA	W 27–24	4,810
November 29	7:00 pm	at No. 10 Northern Iowa*		UNI-Dome; Cedar Falls, IA (NCAA Division I First Round)	ESPN3	L 10–44	10,307
*Non-conference game; ^{†}Homecoming; Rankings from STATS Poll released prior to the game; All times are in Central time

Despite both being members of the Southland Conference, the game vs. Incarnate Word is considered a non-conference matchup and was scheduled between the two schools, not by the Conference.

== Game summaries ==
=== Kansas State ===
	1	2	3	4	Total
Stephen F. Austin	0	10	6	0	16
#20 Kansas State	7	21	14	13	55

This was the first meeting of the two teams and the first game of the season for both teams. The Lumberjacks entered the season picked #6 in the Southland Conference. After forcing the Lumberjacks to punt, Kansas State scored first and maintained the lead for the entire game. Tyler Lockett caught a 9-yard touchdown pass from Jake Waters for a touchdown—the 19th career to move him within seven of his father Kevin Lockett's career school record. Kansas State won the game 55–16.

Kansas State achieved 29 first downs and 478 total offensive yards, averaging 7.9 yards per pass and 4.7 yards per carry, going 2–2 on fourth down attempts. Stephen F. Austin gave up 10 penalties for 69 yards and lost a fumble, but managed two touchdowns and 294 yards of total offense.

=== Incarnate Word ===
	1	2	3	4	Total
Incarnate Word	0	0	3	0	3
Stephen F. Austin	24	0	7	17	48

In their home opener, the Lumberjacks took the lead with 5:19 left in the first quarter when Gus Johnson ran 14 yards for a touchdown, and held the lead for the remainder of the game. The Lumberjacks achieved 31 first downs with 558 yards of total offense while holding Incarnate Word to just 11 first downs and 236 yards of total offense. Stephen F. Austin won with a final score of 38–3.

The Lumberjack's Gus Johnson scored four touchdowns and ran for a career-best 252 yards. At the conclusion of the game, Johnson achieved 2,502 career rushing yards and became the program's all-time rushing touchdown leader with 33. Johnson surpassed Leonard Harris, who scored 32 from 1992 through 1995.

=== Texas A&M–Commerce ===
	1	2	3	4	Total
Texas A&M-Commerce	3	0	7	7	17
Stephen F. Austin	14	10	14	0	38

Within the first 2 1/2 minutes of play, Stephen F. Austin's Gus Johnson scored a touchdown on a 47-yard run. The drive took 4 plays and 1:33 off the clock, and was followed by Jordan Wiggs kicking the extra point to put the score at 7–0. The Lumberjacks led for the remainder of the game. The Lumberjacks achieved 34 first downs and 648 total yards while holding Commerce to 19 first downs and 327 total yards.

=== Weber State ===
	1	2	3	4	Total
Weber State	0	0	13	7	20
Stephen F. Austin	7	7	7	14	35

This year, the Lumberjacks won to bring the series to 1–1, let by Gus Johnson's 83 yards and 12 carries. Each team committed a large number of penalties, combining for a total of 247 penalty yards. The final score was Stephen F. Austin 35, Weber State 20.
