= Gayle and Tom Benson Stadium =

Stadium in San Antonio, Texas, US

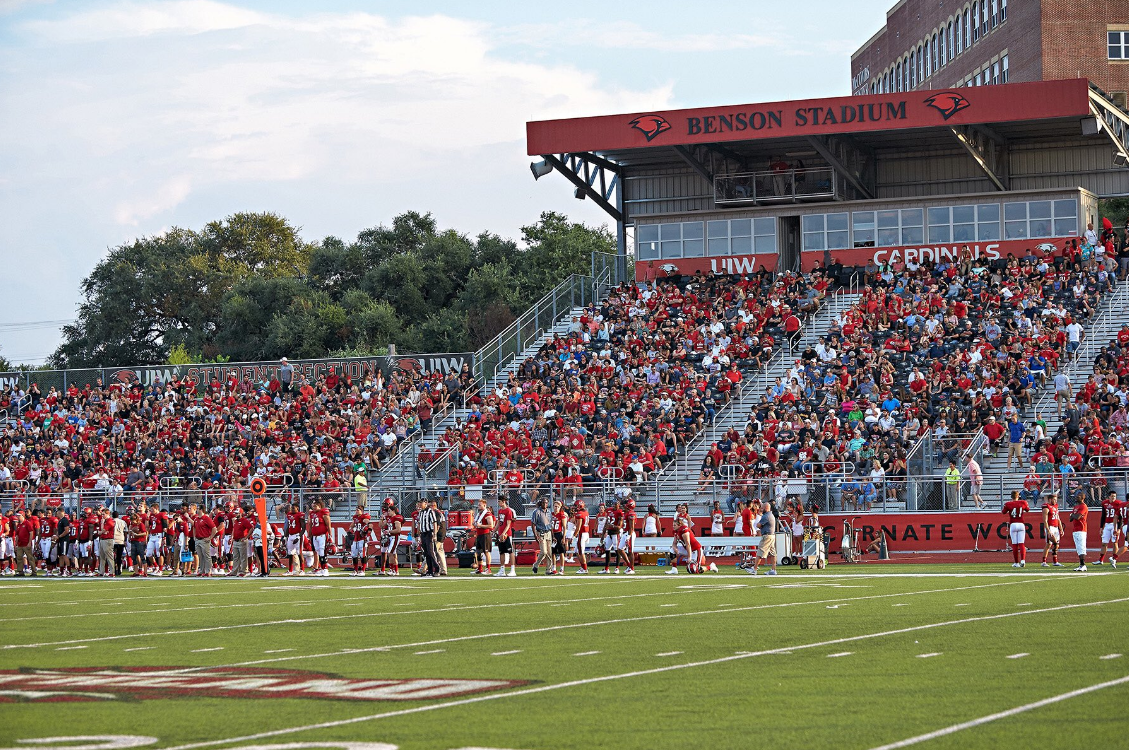
- Interactive map of Gayle and Tom Benson Stadium
- Location: 4301 Broadway Street; San Antonio, Texas 78209
- Coordinates: 29°28′02.9″N 98°28′12″W
- Owner: University of the Incarnate Word
- Operator: University of the Incarnate Word
- Capacity: 3,000 (2008–2009); 6,000 (2010–present)
- Surface: FieldTurf Classic HD
- Record attendance: 6,498; November 17, 2016 vs. Houston Baptist

Construction
- Groundbreaking: January 17, 2008
- Opened: September 1, 2008
- Expanded: 2010 (Added 3,000 seats to present 6,000 capacity)

Tenant
- University of the Incarnate Word Cardinals (NCAA)

Gayle and Tom Benson Stadium is a stadium in San Antonio, Texas. It is the home field for the men's and women's soccer, track and field, and American football teams of the University of the Incarnate Word. The stadium currently seats 6,000 people. It is named after Tom Benson and his wife Gayle. Record stadium attendance of 6,498 was recorded in a game vs Houston Baptist on November 17, 2016.

== History ==
Gayle and Tom Benson Stadium officially opened on campus on September 1, 2008. A special grand opening ceremony was held when the Bensons, along with more than 2,000 Cardinals fans and athletes declared the facility ready for action. Benson and his family long have been ardent supporters of Incarnate Word and provided the necessary funds to start up the University's football program. A San Antonian himself, Benson was the owner of professional football's New Orleans Saints until his passing in 2018.

=== Renovations ===
Benson Stadium now has permanent seating for 6,000 spectators after the 2010 addition of the north bleachers. Atop the original south seating areas are six suites while the north side stands have two press boxes for media and game operations, including a permanent home for KUIW Internet Radio and UIWTV. In May 2018, the original Hellas Matrix artificial playing surface was replaced with FieldTurf's Classic HD surface.

== Features ==
An eight-lane, Sport Track 300 surface track surrounds the field and is an all-weather surface in nature. Accompanying the track are also three jumping pits. Located behind the west endzone is the stadium's Daktronics scoreboard which has a 20 feet (6.1 m) by 10 feet (3.0 m) video screen where Cardinals fans get the latest information about their team as well as a viewing of the game itself.

Adjoining the football field is the Benson Fieldhouse. A 16,000-square-foot (1,500 m^{2}) facility housing a weight room, athletic training facility, locker rooms, team meeting areas and coaches offices.

== Attendance records ==
Rank	Attendance	Date	Game Result
1	6,498	November 17, 2016	Incarnate Word 28, Houston Baptist 26
2	6,325	August 29, 2009	Incarnate Word 42, Monterrey Tech 39
3	5,746	November 5, 2016	Incarnate Word 10, Southeastern Louisiana 30
4	5,667	October 15, 2011	Incarnate Word 38, Texas A&M–Kingsville 41
5	5,643	November 3, 2018	Incarnate Word 43, 21 Sam Houston State 26
6	5,412	September 25, 2010	Incarnate Word 9, 5 Texas A&M–Kingsville 37
7	5,323	September 30, 2017	Incarnate Word 20, Abilene Christian 45
8	5,322	October 8, 2016	Incarnate Word 48, 2 Sam Houston State 63
9	5,229	September 5, 2015	Incarnate Word 18, Texas A&M–Kingsville 16
10	5,001	October 14, 2017	Incarnate Word 33, Lamar 24
11	4,999	October 28, 2017	Incarnate Word 31, Nicholls State 38
12	4,798	September 24, 2016	Incarnate Word 35, 24 McNeese State 42
13	4,755	September 22, 2012	Incarnate Word 0, 25 West Texas A&M 24
14	4,652	November 11, 2017	Incarnate Word 10, 3 Central Arkansas 56
15	4,558	October 25, 2014	Incarnate Word 21, 11 McNeese State 41
16	4,522	September 1, 2012	Incarnate Word 19, Texas College 12
17	4,430	November 16, 2017	Incarnate Word 28, Prairie View A&M 42
18	4,402	November 14, 2015	Incarnate Word 21, Lamar 28
19	4,400	September 3, 2016	Incarnate Word 22, Texas A&M–Kingsville 31
20	4,122	November 16, 2013	Incarnate Word 0, Angelo State 7

== See also ==
- List of NCAA Division I FCS football stadiums
