= Bowers Stadium =

Sports venue at Sam Houston University, Texas

- Death Row
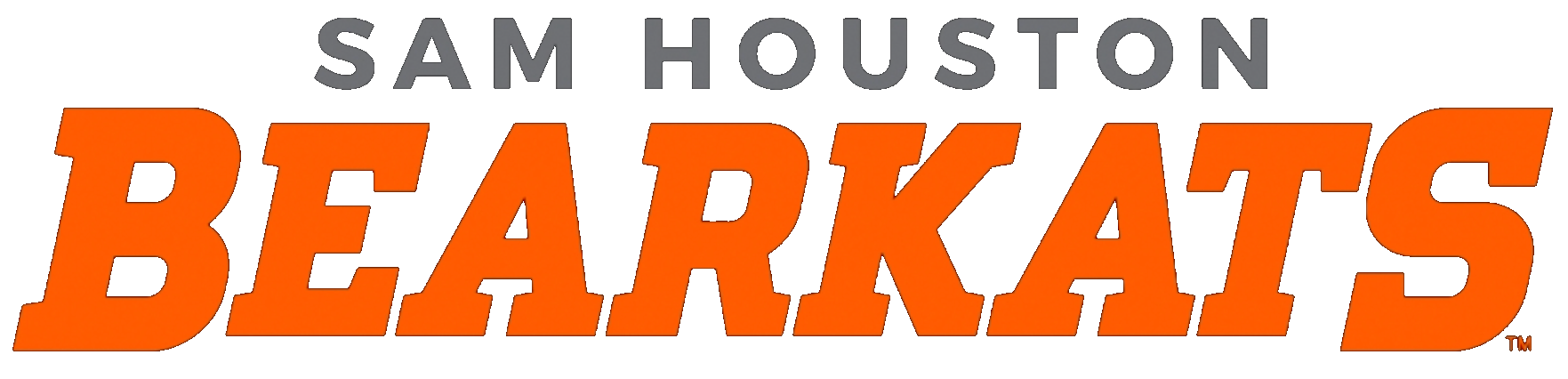

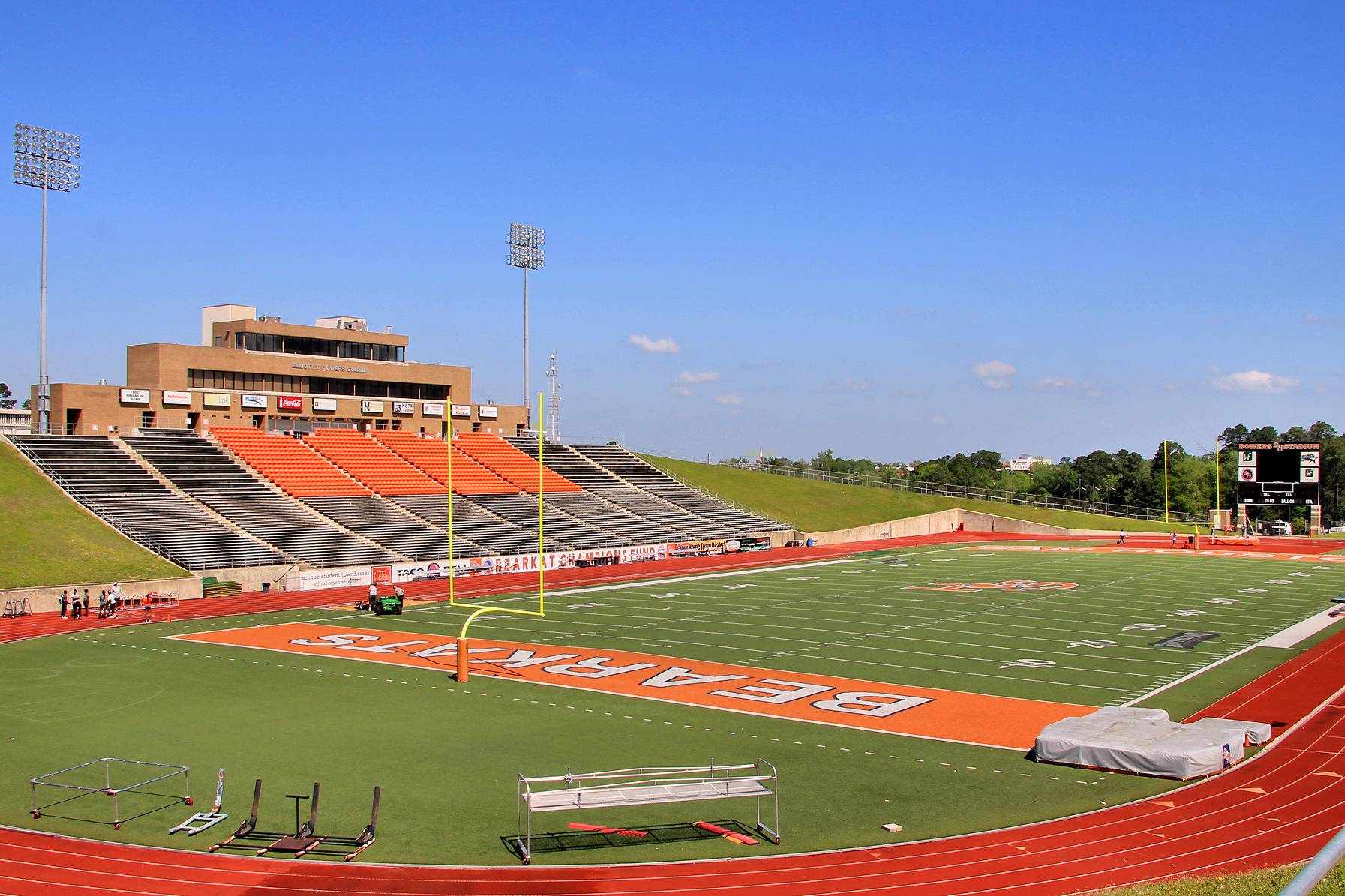
- Interior view of the stadium in 2014
- Interactive map of Bowers Stadium
- Full name: Elliot T. Bowers Stadium
- Location: 620 Bowers Boulevard; Huntsville, Texas 77340
- Coordinates: 30°42′50″N 95°32′30″W
- Owner: Sam Houston State University
- Operator: Sam Houston St Univ. Athletics
- Capacity: 14,000 (2014–present); 12,976 (2011–2013); 14,000 (1982–2010)
- Executive suites: Pressbox-Upper Level: 5 premium suites and President's box Fieldhouse: Bearkat Lounge
- Type: Stadium
- Surface: Real Grass Pro artificial turf (2007–present)
- Record attendance: 16,148 (October 24, 1994, vs. Alcorn State)
- Current use: American football

Construction
- Groundbreaking: 1985
- Opened: September 13, 1986; 40 years ago

Tenants
- Sam Houston Bearkats football (NCAA) (1986–present)

Website
- gobearkats.com/bowers-stadium

Elliott T. Bowers Stadium is a 14,000-seat multi-purpose stadium in Huntsville, Texas. The stadium has been home to the Sam Houston State University Sam Houston Bearkats football team since 1986. Previously, the team played their homes games at Pritchett Field, which currently plays host to the University's women soccer team. The Bearkats are members of Conference USA (CUSA).

== History ==
Bowers stadium was named in honor of Dr. Elliott T. Bowers, a former president of Sam Houston State University. The stadium is located on campus at Sam Houston State University. The address for Bowers Stadium is 620 Bowers Blvd, Huntsville, Texas.

=== Renovations ===
In 2012, new orange chair backs were installed, replacing the older chair backs previously in their place along with new parking lot locker rooms.

In April 2013, The stadium added a video replay system scoreboard, an elevator leading up to the press box, and guest suites in the place of the old coach's press box section. New video graphics were designed and put in place for the video scoreboard as well.

In October 2021, the Ron Mafridge field house is expected to be completed. The field house is expected to feature a new interior and exterior worth $11,667,000 in renovations. The planning for the renovation took just over 15 years and will have an area of 27,000 square feet.

In 2024, the stadium underwent a field renovation that saw the turf being replaced as well as the removal of the track. The Texas State University System Board of Regents approved a $60 million renovation in August 2024, and the Bearkats are scheduled to play their home games at Shell Energy Stadium home to the Houston Dynamo in Houston, 71 miles south of Huntsville, in 2025. The Bearkats have not played at Shell Energy Stadium since 2012 back when the stadium was known as BBVA Stadium which ended in a 50-6 win over Texas Southern.

For the 2026 football season, the Bearkats are set to return home to a renovated Bowers which will include a brand new 60,000-square-foot 5-level press box with a covered concourse with cantilevered club seating, a fan shop, a grand entrance stairwell leading to the concourse, and improved concessions and restrooms.

== Features ==
The stadium includes several suites. In addition to the presidential suite seating 50 people, there are five other suites in the press box third level. Two of the five can seat up to eight while the remaining three can seat up to six. Additionally, the Bearkat Lounge in the Ron Mafridge Fieldhouse can hold up to 100 and the adjacent deck can hold another 75–100 individuals.

== Home Record ==
The Bearkats are 161–57–1 (.737) since opening Bowers Stadium. The Bearkats were undefeated at home during the NCAA Division I FCS playoffs and won the 2020–21 NCAA Division I FCS national championship played in the spring of 2021.

== Attendance records ==
Rank	Attendance	Date	Game Result
1	16,148	October 24, 1994	SHSU 48, Alcorn State 23
2	15,134	September 14, 2024	SHSU 31, Hawaii 14
3	14,566	September 28, 2023	SHSU 28, Jacksonville State 35
4	13,781	September 12, 2026	SHSU 17, Tulsa 23
5	13,059	September 21, 2024	SHSU 31, New Mexico State 11
6	12,941	September 18, 2004	SHSU 41, Montana 29
7	12,863	September 23, 2017	SHSU 66, Nicholls State 17
8	12,367	December 16, 2011	SHSU 31, Montana 28
9	12,182	September 19, 2026	SHSU 59, Nicholls State 0
10	12,117	October 18, 2008	SHSU 17, McNeese 28

== See also ==
- List of NCAA Division I FBS football stadiums
