= 2014 Pac-12 Conference football season =

American college football season

- League: NCAA Division I FBS (Football Bowl Subdivision)
- Sport: American football
- Teams: 12
- TV partner(s): ABC, Fox, Fox Sports 1, ESPN, ESPN2, ESPNU, and Pac-12 Networks

2015 NFL Draft
- Top draft pick: QB Marcus Mariota, Oregon
- Picked by: Tennessee Titans, 2nd overall

Regular season
- North champions: Oregon Ducks
- North runners-up: Stanford Cardinal
- South champions: Arizona Wildcats
- South runners-up: UCLA Bruins; Arizona State Sun Devils

Pac-12 Championship
- Champions: Oregon Ducks
- Runners-up: Arizona Wildcats
- Finals MVP: Marcus Mariota (QB)

Football seasons
- 2013 2015

2014 Pac-12 Conference football standings
	Conf.			Overall
Team	W		L	W		L
North Division
No. 2 Oregon xy$^	8	–	1	13	–	2
Stanford	5	–	4	8	–	5
Washington	4	–	5	8	–	6
California	3	–	6	5	–	7
Oregon State	2	–	7	5	–	7
Washington State	2	–	7	3	–	9
South Division
No. 19 Arizona xy	7	–	2	10	–	4
No. 10 UCLA	6	–	3	10	–	3
No. 12 Arizona State	6	–	3	10	–	3
No. 20 USC	6	–	3	9	–	4
No. 21 Utah	5	–	4	9	–	4
Colorado	0	–	9	2	–	10
Championship: Oregon 51, Arizona 13
^ – College Football Playoff participant; $ – Conference champion; x – Division champion/co-champions; y – Championship game participant; Rankings from AP Poll

The 2014 Pac-12 Conference football season was the fourth season of college football for the Pac-12 Conference as a 12-team league. The season began on Thursday, August 28, 2014, and the first conference game was on Saturday, September 6, 2014, when USC played at Stanford. The final game was the Pac-12 Championship Game at Levi's Stadium on December 5, 2014, with FOX televising the game. The Oregon Ducks defeated the Arizona Wildcats, 51–13 for the conference championship and went on to play in the College Football Playoff. The Ducks defeated the Florida State Seminoles 59–20 in the semifinal game in the Rose Bowl, but lost to the Ohio State Buckeyes 42–20 in the championship game.

== Preseason ==
2014 Pac-12 Spring Football and number of signees on signing day:

North Division

- California - Feb. 24 – April 26 (22 signees)
- Oregon - April 1 – May 3 (21 signees)
- Oregon State - March 31 – May 3 (27 signees)
- Stanford - Feb. 24 – April 12 (20 signees)
- Washington - March 4 – April 19 (24 signees)
- Washington State - March 27 – April 29 (22 signees)

South Division

- Arizona - March 3 – April 12 (25 signees)
- Arizona State - March 18 – April 19 (25 signees)
- Colorado - March 7 – April 12 (22 signees)
- UCLA - April 1 – April 26 (19 signees)
- USC - March 11 – April 19 (19 signees)
- Utah - March 18 – April 19 (19 signees)

=== Pac-12 Media poll ===
2014 Pac-12 Media Day was held at Paramount Studios in Los Angeles, CA on July 23–24, 2014.

North Division

1. Oregon (37) 232 points
2. Stanford (2) 192
3. Washington 142
4. Oregon State 125
5. Washington State 87
6. California 41

South Division

1. UCLA (37) 231
2. USC (1) 181
3. Arizona State (1) 163
4. Arizona 119
5. Utah 82
6. Colorado 43
- Pac-12 Title Game Champion: Oregon (24 votes); Others receiving votes: UCLA (13), Stanford (1), USC (1)

== Head coaches ==
=== Coaching changes ===
There were two coaching changes following the 2014 season including Steve Sarkisian with USC and Chris Petersen with Washington.

=== Coaches ===
North Division

- Sonny Dykes, California – 2nd year
- Mark Helfrich, Oregon – 2nd year
- Mike Riley, Oregon State – 12th year
- David Shaw, Stanford – 4th year
- Chris Petersen, Washington – 1st year
- Mike Leach, Washington State – 3rd year

South Division

- Rich Rodriguez, Arizona – 3rd year
- Todd Graham, Arizona State – 3rd year
- Mike MacIntyre, Colorado – 2nd year
- Jim L. Mora, UCLA – 3rd year
- Steve Sarkisian, USC – 1st year
- Kyle Whittingham, Utah – 10th year

== Rankings ==
	Increase in ranking
	Decrease in ranking
	Not ranked previous week
	Selected for College Football Playoff
(Italics)	Number of first place votes
т	Tied with team above or below also with this symbol

		Pre	Wk 2	Wk 3	Wk 4	Wk 5	Wk 6	Wk 7	Wk 8	Wk 9	Wk 10	Wk 11	Wk 12	Wk 13	Wk 14	Wk 15	Wk 16	Final
Arizona Wildcats	AP		RV	RV	RV	RV	RV	10	16	15	14	21	17	15	12	8	12	19
Arizona Wildcats	C	RV	RV	RV	RV	RV	RV	13	17	15	15	21	18	13	12	8	11	17
Arizona Wildcats	CFP	Not released									12	19	14	15	11	7	10	
Arizona State Sun Devils	AP	19	17	16	15	15	RV	20	17	14	15	11	7	13	13	17	15	12
Arizona State Sun Devils	C	18	16	14	13	12	24	20	18	14	14	12	8	14	13	18	16	14
Arizona State Sun Devils	CFP	Not released									14	9	6	13	13	17	15	
California Golden Bears	AP							RV										
California Golden Bears	C							RV										
California Golden Bears	CFP	Not released																
Colorado Buffaloes	AP																	
Colorado Buffaloes	C																	
Colorado Buffaloes	CFP	Not released																
Oregon Ducks	AP	3 (1)	3 (5)	2 (16)	2 (17)	2 (12)	2 (11)	12	9	6	5	5	3	3 (1)	3 (2)	3 (5)	3 (8)	2
Oregon Ducks	C	4 (1)	4 (2)	4 (6)	3 (6)	4 (3)	4 (7)	11	9	7	6	5	4 (1)	3 (6)	3 (6)	3 (6)	3 (7)	2
Oregon Ducks	CFP	Not released									5	4	2	2	2	2	2	
Oregon State Beavers	AP	RV				RV												
Oregon State Beavers	C	RV	RV	RV	RV	RV			RV									
Oregon State Beavers	CFP	Not released																
Stanford Cardinal	AP	11	13	15	16	16	16	25	23	RV	RV	RV	RV			RV	RV	RV
Stanford Cardinal	C	11	10	16	15	14	13	22	20	RV	RV	RV		RV		RV	RV	RV
Stanford Cardinal	CFP	Not released																
UCLA Bruins	AP	7	11	12	12	11	8	18	RV	25	25	18	14	11	9	16	14	10
UCLA Bruins	C	7	11	12	10	10	9	17	RV	RV	25	18	14	12	10	17	15	10
UCLA Bruins	CFP	Not released									22	18	11	9	8	15	14	
USC Trojans	AP	15	14	9	17	18	18	RV	22	20	RV	RV	RV	24	RV	RV	24	20
USC Trojans	C	15	14	10	21	22	20	RV	25	21	RV	RV	RV	24	RV	RV	RV	21
USC Trojans	CFP	Not released												19		25	24	
Utah Utes	AP			RV				24	20	19	18	20	25	20	RV	RV	23	21
Utah Utes	C							RV	23	19	18	22	RV	21	RV	RV	25	20
Utah Utes	CFP	Not released									17	17	23	17	25	23	22	
Washington Huskies	AP	25	RV	RV	RV	RV	RV	RV	RV									
Washington Huskies	C	25	RV	RV	RV	RV	RV	RV	RV	RV								RV
Washington Huskies	CFP	Not released																
Washington State Cougars	AP																	
Washington State Cougars	C																	
Washington State Cougars	CFP	Not released																

== Schedule ==
Index to colors and formatting
Pac-12 member won
Pac-12 member lost
Pac-12 teams in **bold**

=== Week 1 ===
Date	Time	Visiting team	Home team	Site	TV	Result	Attendance	Ref.
Thursday, August 28	4:30 p.m.	Idaho State	**Utah**	Rice-Eccles Stadium • Salt Lake City, UT	P12N	**W** 56–14	45,925	
Thursday, August 28	7:00 p.m.	Rutgers	**Washington State**	CenturyLink Field • Seattle, WA	FS1	**L** 38–41	30,987	
Thursday, August 28	7:30 p.m.	Weber State	No. 19 **Arizona State**	Sun Devil Stadium • Tempe, AZ	P12N	**W** 45–14	52,133	
Friday, August 29	6:00 p.m.	Colorado State	**Colorado**	Sports Authority Field at Mile High • Denver, CO (Rocky Mountain Showdown)	FS1	**L** 17–31	63,363	
Friday, August 29	7:30 p.m.	UNLV	**Arizona**	Arizona Stadium • Tucson, AZ	ESPN	**W** 58–13	50,103	
Saturday, August 30	9:00 a.m.	No. 7 **UCLA**	Virginia	Scott Stadium • Charlottesville, VA	ESPN	**W** 28–20	44,749	
Saturday, August 30	12:30 p.m.	**California**	Northwestern	Ryan Field • Evanston, IL	ABC/ESPN2	**W** 31–24	34,228	
Saturday, August 30	1:00 p.m.	UC Davis	No. 11 **Stanford**	Stanford Stadium • Stanford, CA (Bill Walsh Legacy Game)	P12N	**W** 45–0	49,509	
Saturday, August 30	1:00 p.m.	Portland State	**Oregon State**	Reser Stadium • Corvallis, OR	P12N	**W** 29–14	40,309	
Saturday, August 30	4:30 p.m.	Fresno State	No. 15 **USC**	Los Angeles Memorial Coliseum • Los Angeles, CA	FOX	**W** 52–13	76,037	
Saturday, August 30	7:30 p.m.	South Dakota	No. 3 **Oregon**	Autzen Stadium • Eugene, OR	P12N	**W** 62–13	57,388	
Saturday, August 30	7:30 p.m.	No. 25 **Washington**	Hawaii	Aloha Stadium • Honolulu, HI	CBSSN	**W** 17–16	36,411	
^{#}Rankings from AP Poll released prior to game. All times are in Pacific Time.

=== Week 2 ===
Date	Time	Visiting team	Home team	Site	TV	Result	Attendance	Ref.
Thursday, September 4	5:00 p.m.	**Arizona**	UTSA	Alamodome • San Antonio, TX	FS1	**W** 26–23	33,472	
Friday, September 5	7:30 p.m.	**Washington State**	Nevada	Mackay Stadium • Reno, NV	ESPN	**L** 13–24	26,023	
Saturday, September 6	12:00 p.m.	Sacramento State	**California**	California Memorial Stadium • Berkeley, CA	P12N	**W** 55–14	48,145	
Saturday, September 6	12:00 p.m.	Eastern Washington	**Washington**	Husky Stadium • Seattle, WA	P12N	**W** 59–52	62,861	
Saturday, September 6	12:00 p.m.	Fresno State	**Utah**	Rice-Eccles Stadium • Salt Lake City, UT	P12N	**W** 59–27	45,864	
Saturday, September 6	12:00 p.m.	**Colorado**	Massachusetts	Gillette Stadium • Foxborough, MA	ESPN3	**W** 41–38	10,227	
Saturday, September 6	12:30 p.m.	No. 14 **USC**	No. 13 **Stanford**	Stanford Stadium • Stanford, CA (Rivalry)	ABC	**USC** 13–10	50,814	
Saturday, September 6	3:30 p.m.	No. 7 Michigan State	No. 3 **Oregon**	Autzen Stadium • Eugene, OR	FOX	**W** 46–27	59,456	
Saturday, September 6	4:00 p.m.	No. 17 **Arizona State**	New Mexico	University Stadium • Albuquerque, NM	CBSSN	**W** 58–23	25,742	
Saturday, September 6	7:00 p.m.	Memphis	No. 11 **UCLA**	Rose Bowl • Pasadena, CA	P12N	**W** 42–35	72,098	
Saturday, September 6	7:30 p.m.	**Oregon State**	Hawaii	Aloha Stadium • Honolulu, HI	CBSSN	**W** 38–30	29,050	
^{#}Rankings from AP Poll released prior to game. All times are in Pacific Time.

=== Week 3 ===
Date	Time	Visiting team	Home team	Site	TV	Result	Attendance	Ref.
Saturday, September 13	11:00 a.m.	Wyoming	No. 2 **Oregon**	Auzten Stadium • Eugene, OR	P12N	**W** 48–14	56,533	
Saturday, September 13	1:00 p.m.	Illinois	**Washington**	Husky Stadium • Seattle, WA	FOX	**W** 44–19	62,325	
Saturday, September 13	2:00 p.m.	Army	No. 15 **Stanford**	Stanford Stadium • Stanford, CA	P12N	**W** 35–0	49,680	
Saturday, September 13	5:00 p.m.	No. 9 **USC**	Boston College	Alumni Stadium • Chestnut Hill, MA	ABC/ESPN2	**L** 31–37	41,632	
Saturday, September 13	5:00 p.m.	No. 12 **UCLA**	Texas	AT&T Stadium • Arlington, TX	FOX	**W** 20–17	60,479	
Saturday, September 13	5:00 p.m.	Portland State	**Washington State**	Martin Stadium • Pullman, WA	P12N	**W** 59–21	30,874	
Saturday, September 13	7:00 p.m.	No. 16 **Arizona State**	**Colorado**	Folsom Stadium • Boulder, CO	ESPNU	**ASU** 38–24	38,547	
Saturday, September 13	8:00 p.m.	Nevada	**Arizona**	Arizona Stadium • Tucson, AZ	P12N	**W** 35–28	48,504	
^{#}Rankings from AP Poll released prior to game. All times are in Pacific Time.

=== Week 4 ===
Date	Time	Visiting team	Home team	Site	TV	Result	Attendance	Ref.
Saturday, September 20	11:00 a.m.	Hawaii	**Colorado**	Folsom Stadium • Boulder, CO	P12N	**W** 21–12	39,478	
Saturday, September 20	12:30 p.m.	**Utah**	Michigan	Michigan Stadium • Ann Arbor, MI	ABC/ESPN2	**W** 26–10	103,890	
Saturday, September 20	3:00 p.m.	Georgia State	**Washington**	Husky Stadium • Seattle, WA	P12N	**W** 45–14	64,608	
Saturday, September 20	7:00 p.m.	**California**	**Arizona**	Arizona Stadium • Tucson, AZ	P12N	**ARIZ** 49–45	45,595	
Saturday, September 20	7:30 p.m.	No. 2 **Oregon**	**Washington State**	Martin Stadium • Pullman, WA	ESPN	**ORE** 38–31	32,952	
Saturday, September 20	7:30 p.m.	San Diego State	**Oregon State**	Reser Stadium • Corvallis, OR	FOX	**W** 28–7	41,339	
^{#}Rankings from AP Poll released prior to game. All times are in Pacific Time.

=== Week 5 ===
Date	Time	Visiting team	Home team	Site	TV	Result	Attendance	Ref.
Thursday, September 25	7:00 p.m.	No. 11 **UCLA**	No. 15 **Arizona State**	Sun Devil Stadium • Tempe, AZ	FS1	**UCLA** 62-27	60,876	
Saturday, September 27	1:00 p.m.	**Colorado**	**California**	California Memorial Stadium • Berkeley, CA	P12N	**CAL** 59–56^{OT}	39,821	
Saturday, September 27	1:15 p.m.	No. 16 **Stanford**	**Washington**	Husky Stadium • Seattle, WA	FOX	**STAN** 20–13	66,512	
Saturday, September 27	5:00 p.m.	**Washington State**	**Utah**	Rice-Eccles Stadium • Salt Lake City, UT	P12N	**WSU** 28-27	45,859	
Saturday, September 27	7:30 p.m.	**Oregon State**	**USC**	Los Angeles Memorial Coliseum • Los Angeles, CA	ESPN	**USC** 35-10	74,521	
^{#}Rankings from AP Poll released prior to game. All times are in Pacific Time.

=== Week 6 ===
Date	Time	Visiting team	Home team	Site	TV	Result	Attendance	Ref.
Thursday, October 2	7:30 p.m.	**Arizona**	No. 2 **Oregon**	Autzen Stadium • Eugene, OR	ESPN	**ARIZ** 31-24	56,032	
Saturday, October 4	12:30 p.m.	No. 14 **Stanford**	No. 9 Notre Dame	Notre Dame Stadium • South Bend, IN (Legends Trophy)	NBC	**L** 14–17	80,795	
Saturday, October 4	1:00 p.m.	**Oregon State**	**Colorado**	Folsom Field • Boulder, CO	P12N	**ORST** 36–31	36,415	
Saturday, October 4	4:30 p.m.	**Arizona State**	No. 16 **USC**	Los Angeles Memorial Coliseum • Los Angeles, CA	FOX	**ASU** 38–34	70,115	
Saturday, October 4	7:30 p.m.	**California**	**Washington State**	Martin Stadium • Pullman, WA	P12N	**CAL** 60–59	30,020	
Saturday, October 4	7:30 p.m.	**Utah**	No. 8 **UCLA**	Rose Bowl • Pasadena, CA	ESPN	**UTAH** 30–28	74,329	
^{#}Rankings from AP Poll released prior to game. All times are in Pacific Time.

=== Week 7 ===
Date	Time	Visiting team	Home team	Site	TV	Result	Attendance	Ref.
Friday, October 10	6:00 p.m.	**Washington State**	No. 25 **Stanford**	Stanford Stadium • Stanford, CA	ESPN	**STAN** 34–17	44,135	
Saturday, October 11	12:30 p.m.	No. 12 **Oregon**	No. 18 **UCLA**	Rose Bowl • Pasadena, CA	FOX	**ORE** 42–30	80,139	
Saturday, October 11	3:00 p.m.	**Washington**	**California**	California Memorial Stadium • Berkeley, CA	P12N	**WASH** 31–7	44,449	
Saturday, October 11	7:30 p.m.	**USC**	No. 10 **Arizona**	Arizona Stadium • Tucson, AZ	ESPN2	**USC** 28–26	56,754	
^{#}Rankings from AP Poll released prior to game. All times are in Pacific Time.

=== Week 8 ===
Date	Time	Visiting team	Home team	Site	TV	Result	Attendance	Ref.
Thursday, October 16	7:00 p.m.	No. 20 **Utah**	**Oregon State**	Reser Stadium • Corvallis, OR	FS1	**UTAH** 29-23^{OT}	40,479	
Saturday, October 18	12:30 p.m.	**UCLA**	**California**	California Memorial Stadium • Berkeley, CA	ABC/ESPN2	**UCLA** 36–34	49,257	
Saturday, October 18	3:00 p.m.	**Colorado**	No. 22 **USC**	Los Angeles Memorial Coliseum • Los Angeles, CA	P12N	**USC** 56–28	74,756	
Saturday, October 18	5:00 p.m.	**Washington**	No. 9 **Oregon**	Autzen Stadium • Eugene, OR (Oregon–Washington football rivalry)	FS1	**ORE** 45-20	57,858	
Saturday, October 18	7:30 p.m.	No. 23 **Stanford**	No. 17 **Arizona State**	Sun Devil Stadium • Tempe, AZ	ESPN	**ASU** 26-10	59,012	
^{#}Rankings from AP Poll released prior to game. All times are in Pacific Time.

=== Week 9 ===
Date	Time	Visiting team	Home team	Site	TV	Result	Attendance	Ref.
Friday, October 24	7:00 p.m.	No. 6 **Oregon**	**California**	Levi's Stadium • Santa Clara, CA	FS1	**ORE** 59–41	55,575	
Saturday, October 25	11:00 a.m.	No. 25 **UCLA**	**Colorado**	Folsom Field • Boulder, CO	P12N	**UCLA** 40–37^{2OT}	37,442	
Saturday, October 25	12:30 p.m.	**Oregon State**	**Stanford**	Stanford Stadium • Stanford, CA	ESPN2	**STAN** 38–14	48,401	
Saturday, October 25	3:00 p.m.	No. 15 **Arizona**	**Washington State**	Martin Stadium • Pullman, WA	P12N	**ARIZ** 59–37	32,952	
Saturday, October 25	7:00 p.m.	No. 20 **USC**	No. 19 **Utah**	Rice-Eccles Stadium • Salt Lake City, UT	FS1	**UTAH** 24–21	47,619	
Saturday, October 25	7:45 p.m.	No. 14 **Arizona State**	**Washington**	Husky Stadium • Seattle, WA	ESPN	**ASU** 24–10	64,666	
^{#}Rankings from AP Poll released prior to game. All times are in Pacific Time.

=== Week 10 ===
Date	Time	Visiting team	Home team	Site	TV	Result	Attendance	Ref.
Saturday, November 1	10:00 a.m.	**Washington**	**Colorado**	Folsom Field • Boulder, CO	P12N	**WASH** 38–23	35,633	
Saturday, November 1	1:30 p.m.	**USC**	**Washington State**	Martin Stadium • Pullman, WA	P12N	**USC** 44–17	25,012	
Saturday, November 1	4:30 p.m.	**Stanford**	No. 5 **Oregon**	Autzen Stadium • Eugene, OR	FOX/FOXD	**ORE** 45–16	58,974	
Saturday, November 1	7:30 p.m.	**California**	**Oregon State**	Reser Stadium • Corvallis, OR	P12N	**CAL** 45–31	42,479	
Saturday, November 1	7:30 p.m.	No. 14 **Arizona**	No. 25 **UCLA**	Rose Bowl • Pasadena, CA	ESPN	**UCLA** 17–7	80,246	
Saturday, November 1	8:00 p.m.	No. 18 **Utah**	No. 15 **Arizona State**	Sun Devil Stadium • Tempe, AZ	FS1	**ASU** 19–16^{OT}	53,754	
^{#}Rankings from AP Poll released prior to game. All times are in Pacific Time.

=== Week 11 ===
Date	Time	Visiting team	Home team	Site	TV	Result	Attendance	Ref.
Saturday, November 8	12:30 p.m.	No. 8 Notre Dame	No. 11 **Arizona State**	Sun Devil Stadium • Tempe, AZ	ABC	**W** 55-31	65,870	
Saturday, November 8	1:00 p.m.	**Washington State**	**Oregon State**	Reser Stadium • Corvallis, OR	P12N	**WSU** 39-32	44,377	
Saturday, November 8	4:00 p.m.	No. 18 **UCLA**	**Washington**	Husky Stadium • Seattle, WA	FS1	**UCLA** 44-30	65,547	
Saturday, November 8	5:00 p.m.	**Colorado**	No. 21 **Arizona**	Arizona Stadium • Tucson, AZ	P12N	**ARIZ** 38–20	50,177	
Saturday, November 8	7:00 p.m.	No. 5 **Oregon**	No. 20 **Utah**	Rice-Eccles Stadium • Salt Lake City, UT	ESPN	**ORE** 51–27	47,528	
^{#}Rankings from AP Poll released prior to game. All times are in Pacific Time.

=== Week 12 ===
Date	Time	Visiting team	Home team	Site	TV	Result	Attendance	Ref.
Thursday, November 13	6:00 p.m.	**California**	**USC**	Los Angeles Memorial Coliseum • Los Angeles, CA	ESPN	**USC** 38-30	64,615	
Saturday, November 15	12:30 p.m.	**Washington**	No. 17 **Arizona**	Arizona Stadium • Tucson, AZ	FOX	**ARIZ** 27-26	47,757	
Saturday, November 15	3:00 p.m.	No. 25 **Utah**	**Stanford**	Stanford Stadium • Stanford, CA	P12N	**UTAH** 20-17	44,635	
Saturday, November 15	7:45 p.m.	No. 7 **Arizona State**	**Oregon State**	Reser Stadium • Corvallis, OR	ESPN	**ORST** 35-27	40,525	
^{#}Rankings from AP Poll released prior to game. All times are in Pacific Time.

=== Week 13 ===
Date	Time	Visiting team	Home team	Site	TV	Result	Attendance	Ref.
Saturday, November 22	10:00 a.m.	**Washington State**	No. 13 **Arizona State**	Sun Devil Stadium • Tempe, AZ	P12N	**ASU** 52-31	51,428	
Saturday, November 22	12:30 p.m.	No. 15 **Arizona**	No. 20 **Utah**	Rice-Eccles Stadium • Salt Lake City, UT	ESPN	**ARIZ** 42-10	45,824	
Saturday, November 22	1:00 p.m.	**Stanford**	**California**	California Memorial Stadium • Berkeley, CA (Big Game)	FS1/FOXD	**STAN** 38-17	56,483	
Saturday, November 22	1:30 p.m.	**Colorado**	No. 3 **Oregon**	Auzten Stadium • Eugene, OR	P12N	**ORE** 44-10	55,898	
Saturday, November 22	5:00 p.m.	No. 24 **USC**	No. 11 **UCLA**	Rose Bowl • Pasadena, CA (Victory Bell)	ABC	**UCLA** 38–20	82,431	
Saturday, November 22	7:30 p.m.	**Oregon State**	**Washington**	Husky Stadium • Seattle, WA	P12N	**WASH** 37–13	65,036	
^{#}Rankings from AP Poll released prior to game. All times are in Pacific Time.

=== Week 14 ===
Date	Time	Visiting team	Home team	Site	TV	Result	Attendance	Ref.
Friday, November 28	12:30 p.m.	**Stanford**	No. 9 **UCLA**	Rose Bowl • Pasadena, CA	ABC	**STAN** 31–10	70,658	
Friday, November 28	12:30 p.m.	No. 13 **Arizona State**	No. 12 **Arizona**	Arizona Stadium • Tucson, AZ (Territorial Cup)	FOX	**ARIZ** 42–35	56,083	
Saturday, November 29	10:00 a.m.	**Utah**	**Colorado**	Folsom Field • Boulder, CO (Rumble in the Rockies)	P12N	**UTAH** 38–34	39,155	
Saturday, November 29	12:30 p.m.	Notre Dame	**USC**	Los Angeles Memorial Coliseum • Los Angeles, CA (Jeweled Shillelagh)	FOX	**W** 49–14	79,586	
Saturday, November 29	1:30 p.m.	BYU	**California**	California Memorial Stadium • Berkeley, CA	P12N	**L** 35–42	47,856	
Saturday, November 29	5:00 p.m.	No. 3 **Oregon**	**Oregon State**	Reser Stadium • Corvallis, OR (Civil War)	ABC	**ORE** 47–19	45,722	
Saturday, November 29	7:30 p.m.	**Washington**	**Washington State**	Martin Stadium • Pullman, WA (Apple Cup)	FS1	**WASH** 31–13	32,952	
^{#}Rankings from AP Poll released prior to game. All times are in Pacific Time.

== Championship game ==
The championship game will be played on December 5, 2014. It will feature the highest ranked teams from two division championships.

=== Week 15 (Pac-12 Championship Game) ===
Date	Time	Visiting team	Home team	Site	TV	Result	Attendance	Ref.
Friday, December 5	6:00 p.m.	No. 8 Arizona	No. 3 Oregon	Levi's Stadium • Santa Clara, California (Pac-12 Championship Game)	FOX	ORE 51–13	45,618	
^{#}Rankings from AP Poll released prior to game. All times are in Pacific Time.

== Postseason games ==
Following the 2014 regular season the Pac-12 had all eight of its bowl eligible teams selected to play in a post-season bowl game. The two marque match ups will be the Rose Bowl, in which the Oregon Ducks will face off against the Florida State Seminoles in the semi-finals of the College Football Playoff and the Fiesta Bowl, in which the Arizona Wildcats will face off against Mountain West Conference champions, Boise State. Overall, the Pac-12 will see two bowl games each against the ACC, Big Ten, Big 12 and Mountain West Conferences.

For the fourth consecutive year, the Pac-12, often considered to be the second best Division I FBS (formerly Division I-A) football conference, will not play a bowl game against what many consider to be the best conference, the SEC. The last time that teams from the Pac-12 and SEC met in the post-season was the 2011 BCS National Championship Game when Auburn defeated Oregon for the national championship. The only hope for a Pac-12 v. SEC match-up was for Oregon to win the Rose Bowl, and SEC Conference Champions Alabama to win the Sugar Bowl, in which case both teams would have squared off in the inaugural College Football Championship Game. Because Alabama lost the Sugar Bowl and Oregon won the Rose Bowl, the Ducks played the Big Ten Conference Champion Ohio State Buckeyes in a re-match of the 2010 Rose Bowl.

Pac-12 team in bold:

**Bowl Game**	**Date**	**Stadium**	**City**	**TV**	**Time (PST)**	**Match-up**	**Pac-12 Team**	**Score**	**Opponent**	**Score**
Las Vegas Bowl	Saturday, December 20, 2014	Sam Boyd Stadium	Paradise, Nevada	ABC	12:30 p.m.	Pac-12 #6 vs. MW #2	**Utah** (8–4)	**45**	Colorado State (10–2)	10
Sun Bowl	Saturday, December 27, 2014	Sun Bowl Stadium	El Paso, Texas	CBS	11:00 a.m.	Pac-12 #4 vs. ACC #4	**#15 Arizona State** (9–3)	**36**	Duke (9–3)	31
Holiday Bowl	Saturday, December 27, 2014	Qualcomm Stadium	San Diego, California	ESPN	5:00 p.m.	Pac-12 #5 vs. Big Ten #4	**#24 USC** (8–4)	**45**	#25 Nebraska (9–3)	42
Foster Farms Bowl	Tuesday, December 30, 2014	Levi's Stadium	Santa Clara, California	ESPN	7:00 p.m.	Pac-12 #8 vs. Big Ten #6	**Stanford** (7–5)	**45**	Maryland (7–5)	21
Fiesta Bowl	Wednesday, December 31, 2014	University of Phoenix Stadium	Glendale, Arizona	ESPN	4:00 p.m.	CFP "New Year's 6" Bowl	#12 Arizona (10–3)	30	#21 **Boise State** (11–2)	**38**
Rose Bowl	Thursday, January 1, 2015	Rose Bowl	Pasadena, California	ESPN	2:10 p.m.	CFP Semifinal	**#3 Oregon** (12–1)	**59**	#2 Florida State (13–0)	20
Alamo Bowl	Friday, January 2, 2015	Alamodome	San Antonio, Texas	ESPN	3:45 p.m.	Pac-12 #3 vs. Big 12 #3	#14 **UCLA** (9–3)	**40**	#11 Kansas State (9–3)	35
Cactus Bowl	Friday, January 2, 2015	Sun Devil Stadium	Tempe, Arizona	ESPN	7:15 p.m.	Pac-12 #7 vs. Big 12 #7	Washington (8–5)	22	**Oklahoma State** (6–6)	**30**
National Championship	Monday, January 12, 2015	AT&T Stadium	Arlington, Texas	ESPN	5:30 p.m.	CFP National Championship	#3 Oregon (13–1)	20	#5 **Ohio State** (13–1)	**42**

== Records against other conferences ==
2014 records against non-conference foes:

Regular Season

Power 5 Conferences	Record
ACC	1–1
Big Ten	4–1
Big 12	1–0
Notre Dame	2–1
Power 5 Total	8–3
Other FBS Conferences	Record
American	1–0
C-USA	1–0
MAC	1–0
Mountain West	10–2
Independents (Excluding Notre Dame)	1–1
Other FBS Total	15–3 (Including a win over Georgia State, a FBS team from the Sun Belt Conference)
FCS Opponents	Record
Football Championship Subdivision	8–0
Total Non-Conference Record	31-6

Post Season

Power 5 Conferences	Record
ACC	2–0
Big Ten	2–1
Big 12	1–1
Power 5 Total	5–2
Other FBS Conferences	Record
Mountain West	1–1
Total Bowl Record	6–3

== Players of the week and honors ==
Following each week's games, Pac-12 conference officials select the players of the week from the conference's teams.

Week	Offensive			Defensive			Special teams		
Week	Player	Position	Team	Player	Position	Team	Player	Position	Team
Week 1 (Sept. 1)	Cody Kessler	QB	USC	Eric Kendricks	LB	UCLA	Kaelin Clay	WR	Utah
Week 2 (Sept. 8)	Marcus Mariota	QB	Oregon	Leonard Williams	DE	USC	Andre Heidari	PK	USC
Week 3 (Sept. 15)	Jerry Neuheisel	QB	UCLA	Shaq Thompson	LB	Washington	Ishmael Adams	DB	UCLA
Week 4 (Sept. 22)	Cayleb Jones	WR	Arizona	Gionni Paul	LB	Utah	Andy Phillips	K	Utah
Week 5 (Sept. 29)	Brett Hundley	QB	UCLA	Peter Kalambayi	LB	Stanford	Ishmael Adams 2nd	DB	UCLA
Week 6 (Oct. 6)	Connor Halliday	QB	WSU	Nate Orchard	DE	Utah	Trevor Davis	WR	California
Week 7 (Oct. 13)	Javorius Allen	RB	USC	Shaq Thompson 2nd	LB	Washington	Ty Montgomery	WR	Stanford
Week 8 (Oct. 20)	Cody Kessler 2nd	QB	USC	Damarious Randall	S	Arizona State	Andy Phillips 2nd	K	Utah
Week 9 (Oct. 27)	Marcus Mariota 2nd	QB	Oregon	Scooby Wright III	LB	Arizona	Adoreé Jackson	CB	USC
Week 10 (Nov. 3)	Marcus Mariota 3rd	QB	Oregon	Scooby Wright III 2nd	LB	Arizona	Zane Gonzalez	CB	Arizona State
Week 11 (Nov. 10)	Luke Falk	QB	WSU	Lloyd Carrington	CB	ASU	Ka’imi Fairbairn	K	UCLA
Week 13 (Nov. 24)	Nick Wilson	RB	Arizona	Eric Kendricks 2nd	LB	UCLA	Drew Riggleman	P	Arizona
Week 14 (Dec. 1)	Cody Kessler 3rd	QB	USC	Scooby Wright III 3rd	LB	Arizona	Tom Hackett	P	Utah
Week 15 (Dec. 8)									

=== Position key ===
Center	C	Cornerback	CB	Defensive back	DB	Defensive end	DE
Defensive lineman	DL	Defensive tackle	DT	Guard	G	Kickoff returner	KR
Offensive tackle	OT	Offensive lineman	OL	Linebacker	LB	Long snapper	LS
Punter	P	Placekicker	PK	Punt returner	PR	Quarterback	QB
Running back	RB	Safety	S	Tight end	TE	Wide receiver	WR

== Awards and honors ==
Butkus Award

- Linebacker Eric Kendricks, UCLA

Bronko Nagurski Trophy

- Scooby Wright III, Arizona

Lombardi Award

- Scooby Wright III, Arizona

Chuck Bednarik Award

- Scooby Wright, Arizona

Doak Walker Award

Lott IMPACT Trophy

- Eric Kendricks, UCLA

Maxwell Award

- Marcus Mariota, Oregon

Walter Camp Player of the Year Award

- Marcus Mariota, Oregon

Pac-12 Morris Trophy (top lineman)

=== All-Americans ===
Academic All-America Team Member of the Year (CoSIDA)

AFCA Coaches' All-Americans First Team:

=== All-Conference teams ===
- Offensive Player of the Year: Marcus Mariota, QB, Oregon
- Pat Tillman Defensive Player of the Year: Scooby Wright III, LB, Arizona
- Offensive Freshman of the Year: Royce Freeman, RB, Oregon
- Defensive Freshman of the Year: Adoree Jackson, CB, USC
- Coach of the Year: Rich Rodriguez, Arizona

Offense:

Pos.	Name	Yr.	School	Name	Yr.	School
First Team				Second Team		
QB	Marcus Mariota (3)	Jr.	Oregon	Brett Hundley	Jr.	UCLA
RB	Javorius Allen	Jr.	USC	D. J. Foster	Jr.	Arizona State
RB	Devontae Booker	Jr.	Utah	Royce Freeman	Fr.	Oregon
WR	Nelson Agholor	Jr.	USC	Vince Mayle	Jr.	Washington State
WR	Jaelen Strong	Jr.	Arizona State	Nelson Spruce	Jr.	Colorado
TE	Pharaoh Brown	Jr.	Oregon	Austin Hooper	So.	Stanford
OL	Jamil Douglas	Sr.	Arizona State	Jake Brendel	Jr.	UCLA
OL	Jake Fisher	Sr.	Oregon	Steven Gurrola	Sr.	Arizona
OL	Hroniss Grasu (3)	Sr.	Oregon	Nick Kelly	Jr.	Arizona State
OL	Andrus Peat	Jr.	Stanford	Kyle Murphy	Jr.	Stanford
OL	Max Tuerk	Jr.	USC	Jeremiah Poutasi	Jr.	Utah

Defense:

Pos.	Name	Yr.	School	Name	Yr.	School
First Team				Second Team		
DL	Henry Anderson	Sr.	Stanford	DeForest Buckner	Jr.	Oregon
DL	Nate Orchard	Sr.	Utah	Kenny Clark	So.	UCLA
DL	Danny Shelton	Sr.	Washington	Owamagbe Odighizuwa	Sr.	UCLA
DL	Leonard Williams (2)	Jr.	USC	Dylan Wynn	Sr.	Oregon State
LB	Hau'oli Kikaha	Sr.	Washington	Myles Jack	So.	UCLA
LB	Shaq Thompson	Jr.	Washington	Eric Kendricks	Sr.	UCLA
LB	Scooby Wright III	So.	Arizona	A.J. Tarpley	Sr.	Stanford
DB	Ishmael Adams	So.	UCLA	Erick Dargan	Sr.	Oregon
DB	Su'a Cravens	So.	USC	Troy Hill	Sr.	Oregon
DB	Ifo Ekpre-Olomu (3)	Sr.	Oregon	Anthony Jefferson	Sr.	UCLA
DB	Damarious Randall	Sr.	Arizona State	Fabian Moreau	Jr.	UCLA
DB	Jordan Richards	Sr.	Stanford	Steven Nelson	Sr.	Oregon State

Specialists:

Pos.	Name	Yr.	School	Name	Yr.	School
First Team				Second Team		
PK	Andy Phillips	So.	Utah	Zane Gonzalez	So.	Arizona State
P	Tom Hackett (2)	Jr.	Utah	Drew Riggleman	Jr.	Arizona
RS	Kaelin Clay	Sr.	Utah	Ty Montgomery	Sr.	Stanford
AP	Shaq Thompson	Jr.	Arizona State	Charles Nelson	Fr.	Oregon
AP				JuJu Smith	Fr.	USC

=== All-Academic ===
First team

Pos.	Name	School	Yr.	GPA	Major

== Home game attendance ==
During the 2014 season the members of the Pac-12 Conference saw nearly four million spectators attend football games at their home stadiums. UCLA led the conference with 459,901 total spectators attending the six games held at the Rose Bowl, taking the title back from cross-town rivals USC. Despite selling out their stadium in half of their games, Washington State recorded the lowest overall attendance with 184,762 total spectators attending the six games held at Martin Stadium.

Oregon and Utah both continued their respective sellout streaks as well as their statuses as the only two programs in the conference and in their respective divisions to sell out each game or record a total season average of over 100% capacity. The Ducks led the conference in sellout percentage for the fourth consecutive year, filling Autzen Stadium to an average of 106% capacity throughout the season. The only teams aside from the Ducks and the Utes to achieve sellout attendance for a game were the Arizona Wildcats and the Stanford Cardinal in their losses to USC, and the Washington State Cougars, in their losses to eventual division champions Arizona and Oregon and hated rivals Washington in the Apple Cup.

When it came to conference rivalry games played at home, the advantage was nearly split, at 4–3 (.571) with the higher-ranked team coming out on top in each case.

No Pac-12 team achieved a perfect record in their home stadium this year; the teams with the best home records were the division champions Arizona and Oregon, both going 6–1 (.857), followed by Arizona State and USC both of whom also suffered just one loss but playing one less overall game, posting records of 5–1 (.833). The single loss suffered at home by Arizona was delivered by USC; Oregon's sole defeat came from Arizona, as did the single home defeat of Arizona State, who was the only team to beat USC in the LA Coliseum.

California and Oregon faced off in a game at the newly built Levi's Stadium in Santa Clara, California, home of the San Francisco 49ers as well as the new home of the Pac-12 Football Championship Game at least until the 2016 season. The game was officially considered a home game for Cal because of the stadium's proximity to the Golden Bears' home base at Berkeley, however due to the proximity to the Ducks's home of Eugene and the large number of Oregon alumni who live in the Bay Area, the stadium was seen as a neutral location.

Washington State continued their practice of hosting a "home game" at CenturyLink Field in Seattle, home of the Seattle Seahawks, in order to attract audiences that would exceed the capacity of Martin Stadium. Unlike the match-up between Oregon and California, CenturyLink Field provided a home-field environment that helped the Cougars establish and maintain an early lead over Rutgers, however, going into the fourth quarter leading 31–24, the Scarlet Knights rallied in the fourth quarter by scoring 17 points to Washington State's 7, going on to win the game 41–38.

As for non-conference opponents in Pac-12 arenas, several marque programs were defeated including the defending Big Ten and Rose Bowl champions, Michigan State, who lost to the Ducks in Autzen Stadium, along with two wins over Notre Dame, who were defeated in Sun Devil Stadium and the LA Coliseum. All in all, the Pac-12 went 23–2 (.920) in non-conference home match ups, with the sole losses coming from Rutgers and BYU.

The conference participated in two non-conference neutral site games and split their record at 1–1 (.500). UCLA defeated Texas at AT&T Stadium, home of the Dallas Cowboys, in the Advocare Cowboys Showdown. AT&T Stadium is located in Arlington, Texas, a three-hour drive from the Longhorns campus in Austin. The other neutral-site game was the Rocky Mountain Showdown played at Mile High Stadium, home of the Denver Broncos, in Denver, Colorado in which Colorado lost to their in-state rivals Colorado State.

Team	Stadium	Capacity	Game 1	Game 2	Game 3	Game 4	Game 5	Game 6	Game 7	Total	Average	% of capacity
Arizona	Arizona Stadium	56,029	50,103	48,504	45,595	**56,754**†	50,177	47,757	56,083	354,973	50,710	90.51%
Arizona State	Sun Devil Stadium	67,704	52,133	60,876	59,012	53,754	65,870†	51,428	—	343,073	57,179	84.45%
California	California Memorial Stadium	62,467	48,145	39,821	44,449	49,257	55,575^{A}	56,483†	47,856	286,011	47,669	76.31%
Colorado	Folsom Field	53,613	38,547	39,478†	36,415	37,442	35,633	39,155	—	226,670	37,778	70.46%
Oregon	Autzen Stadium	54,000	**57,388**	**59,456**†	**56,533**	**56,032**	**57,858**	**58,974**	**55,898**	402,139	**57,448**	**106.39%**
Oregon State	Reser Stadium	45,674	40,309	41,339	40,479	42,479	44,377	40,525	45,722†	295,230	42,176	92.34%
Stanford	Stanford Stadium	50,424	49,509	**50,814**†	49,680	44,135	48,401	44,635	—	287,174	47,862	94.92%
UCLA	Rose Bowl	80,816	72,098	74,329	80,139	80,246	**82,431**†	70,658	—	459,901	76,650	94.84%
USC	Los Angeles Memorial Coliseum	93,607	76,037	74,521	70,115	74,756	64,615	79,586†	—	439,630	73,272	78.28%
Utah	Rice-Eccles Stadium	45,807	**45,925**	**45,864**	**45,859**	**47,619**†	**47,528**	**45,824**	—	278,619	**46,437**	**101.37%**
Washington	Husky Stadium	70,138	62,861	62,325	64,608	66,512	64,666	65,547†	65,036	451,555	64, 508	91.97%
Washington State	Martin Stadium	32,740	30,927^{B}	30,874	**32,952**†	30,020	**32,952**†	25,012	**32,952**†	184,762	30,794	94.06%

^A Game played at Levi's Stadium in Santa Clara, CA.
^B Game played at CenturyLink Field in Seattle, WA.
Bold – Exceed capacity
†Season high

== Notes ==
- February 5, 2014 – National Signing Day, first day when high school students can sign a NLI with colleges
- September 8, 2014 – USC football coach Steve Sarkisian and AD Pat Haden were reprimanded by Pac-12 Conference commissioner Larry Scott for attempting "to influence the officiating, and ultimately the outcome of a contest" during the September 6 game with Stanford. Haden was fined $25,000.
- October 4, 2014 – USC football team damaged the wall of the Omni Los Angeles hotel. They also put a hole in the visitors’ locker room at Arizona Stadium when the team played there on October 11, 2014.
- October 4, 2014 - Washington State's Connor Halliday sets single game FBS passing record of 734 yards in loss against California.
