= 2014 University of North Dakota football team =

American college football season

2014 University of North Dakota football
- Conference: Big Sky Conference
- Record: 5–7 (3–5 Big Sky)
- Head coach: Bubba Schweigert (1st season)
- Offensive coordinator: Paul Rudolph (1st season)
- Offensive scheme: Pistol
- Defensive coordinator: Eric Schmidt (1st season)
- Base defense: 3–4
- Home stadium: Alerus Center

2014 Big Sky Conference football standings
	Conf.			Overall
Team	W		L	W		L
No. 4 Eastern Washington $^	7	–	1	11	–	3
No. 13 Montana ^	6	–	2	9	–	5
No. 20 Montana State ^	6	–	2	8	–	5
No. 25 Idaho State	6	–	2	8	–	4
Cal Poly	5	–	3	7	–	5
Northern Arizona	5	–	3	7	–	5
Sacramento State	4	–	4	7	–	5
North Dakota	3	–	5	5	–	7
Southern Utah	3	–	5	3	–	9
Northern Colorado	2	–	6	3	–	8
Portland State	2	–	6	3	–	9
Weber State	2	–	6	2	–	10
UC Davis	1	–	7	2	–	9
$ – Conference champion; ^ – FCS playoff participant; Rankings from The Sports Network poll

The 2014 University of North Dakota football team represented the University of North Dakota in the 2014 NCAA Division I FCS football season. They were led by first year head coach Bubba Schweigert and played their home games at the Alerus Center. They were members of the Big Sky Conference. They finished the season 5–7, 3–5 in Big Sky play to finish in a tie for eighth place.

== Schedule ==
Date	Time	Opponent	Site	TV	Result	Attendance
August 28	9:00 pm	at San Jose State*	Spartan Stadium; San Jose, CA	ESPN3	L 10–42	10,371
September 6	6:00 pm	Robert Morris*	Alerus Center; Grand Forks, ND	Midco SN	W 16–13	9,118
September 13	6:00 pm	at Missouri State*	Robert W. Plaster Stadium; Springfield, MO		L 0–38	18,386
September 20	6:00 pm	Stony Brook*	Alerus Center; Grand Forks, ND	Midco SN	W 13–3	7,030
September 27	2:30 pm	at No. 13 Montana State	Bobcat Stadium; Bozeman, MT	BSTV	L 18–29	19,477
October 4	1:30 pm	No. 7 Montana	Alerus Center; Grand Forks, ND	Midco SN	L 15–18	9,025
October 11	1:30 pm	Portland State^{†}	Alerus Center; Grand Forks, ND	Midco SN	W 24–16	7,894
October 25	2:05 pm	at Southern Utah	Eccles Coliseum; Cedar City, UT	BSTV	L 17–35	2,521
November 1	4:00 pm	at No. 6 Eastern Washington	Roos Field; Cheney, WA	SWX	L 3–54	9,212
November 8	12:00 pm	Weber State	Alerus Center; Grand Forks, ND	Midco SN	L 12–24	5,932
November 15	12:00 pm	No. 22 Northern Arizona	Alerus Center; Grand Forks, ND	Midco SN	W 30–28	5,916
November 22	1:00 pm	at Northern Colorado	Nottingham Field; Greeley, CO	BSTV	W 33–14	3,698
*Non-conference game; ^{†}Homecoming; Rankings from The Sports Network Poll released prior to the game; All times are in Central time
