= 2014 Montana Grizzlies football team =

American college football season

2014 Montana Grizzlies football

FCS Playoffs Second Round vs Eastern Washington, L 20–37
- Conference: Big Sky Conference

Ranking
- Sports Network: No. 13
- FCS Coaches: No. 11
- Record: 9–5 (6–2 Big Sky)
- Head coach: Mick Delaney (3rd season)
- Co-offensive coordinators: Scott Gragg (2nd season); Kefense Hynson (2nd season)
- Defensive coordinator: Ty Gregorak (3rd season)
- Home stadium: Washington–Grizzly Stadium

2014 Big Sky Conference football standings
	Conf.			Overall
Team	W		L	W		L
No. 4 Eastern Washington $^	7	–	1	11	–	3
No. 13 Montana ^	6	–	2	9	–	5
No. 20 Montana State ^	6	–	2	8	–	5
No. 25 Idaho State	6	–	2	8	–	4
Cal Poly	5	–	3	7	–	5
Northern Arizona	5	–	3	7	–	5
Sacramento State	4	–	4	7	–	5
North Dakota	3	–	5	5	–	7
Southern Utah	3	–	5	3	–	9
Northern Colorado	2	–	6	3	–	8
Portland State	2	–	6	3	–	9
Weber State	2	–	6	2	–	10
UC Davis	1	–	7	2	–	9
$ – Conference champion; ^ – FCS playoff participant; Rankings from The Sports Network poll

The 2014 Montana Grizzlies football team represented the University of Montana in the 2014 NCAA Division I FCS football season. The Grizzlies were led by head coach Mick Delaney in his third and final year and played their home games on campus at Washington–Grizzly Stadium. Montana participated as a member of the Big Sky Conference, of which they are a charter member. They finished the season 9–5, 6–2 in Big Sky play to finish tied for second place. They received an at-large bid to the FCS Playoffs where they lost in the second round to inter conference rival Eastern Washington.

On November 17, head coach Mick Delaney announced he would be retiring at the end of the season. He finished at Montana with a three-year record of 24–14.

== Schedule ==
Date	Time	Opponent	Rank	Site	TV	Result	Attendance
August 30	2:00 pm	at Wyoming*	No. 5	War Memorial Stadium; Laramie, WY	RTNW	L 12–17	25,243
September 6	3:30 pm	Central Washington*	No. 4	Washington–Grizzly Stadium; Missoula, MT	CMM	W 48–14	24,697
September 13	7:00 pm	South Dakota*	No. 4	Washington–Grizzly Stadium; Missoula, MT	CMM	W 28–20	26,303
September 20	1:30 pm	at No. 1 North Dakota State*	No. 4	Fargodome; Fargo, ND	CMM	L 10–22	18,890
September 27	1:30 pm	Northern Colorado^{†}	No. 7	Washington–Grizzly Stadium; Missoula, MT	RTNW	W 38–13	25,269
October 4	12:30 pm	at North Dakota	No. 7	Alerus Center; Grand Forks, ND	CMM	W 18–15	9,025
October 18	12:00 pm	UC Davis	No. 7	Washington–Grizzly Stadium; Missoula, MT	CMM	W 42–28	25,766
October 25	7:00 pm	at Cal Poly	No. 7	Alex G. Spanos Stadium; San Luis Obispo, CA	CMM	L 21–41	10,775
November 1	12:00 pm	Sacramento State	No. 12	Washington–Grizzly Stadium; Missoula, MT	RTNW	W 31–13	24,035
November 8	1:00 pm	at No. 5 Eastern Washington	No. 11	Roos Field; Cheney, WA (EWU–UM Governors Cup)	RTNW	L 26–36	11,339
November 15	1:00 pm	at Southern Utah	No. 16	Eccles Coliseum; Ceder City, UT	CMM	W 35–17	3,079
November 22	3:00 pm	No. 12 Montana State	No. 13	Washington–Grizzly Stadium; Missoula, MT (rivalry)	RTNW	W 34–7	26,352
November 29	2:00 pm	San Diego*	No. 12	Washington–Grizzly Stadium; Missoula, MT (NCAA Division I First Round)	ESPN3	W 52–14	14,018
December 6	2:30 pm	at No. 4 Eastern Washington*	No. 12	Roos Field; Cheney, WA (NCAA Division I Second Round)	ESPN3	L 20–37	7,919
*Non-conference game; ^{†}Homecoming; Rankings from The Sports Network Poll released prior to the game; All times are in Mountain time

- Cowles Montana Media Broadcasting is the former Max Media. ABC or FOX stations in Missoula, Kalispell, Butte, Bozeman, Great Falls, and Helena; the Bilins NBC affiliate, and a mix of SWX and KULR in Billings will air the games.

== Game summaries ==
Final score source

=== @ Wyoming ===
	1	2	3	4	Total
#5 Grizzlies	0	6	0	6	12
Cowboys	3	0	14	0	17

=== Central Washington ===
	1	2	3	4	Total
Wildcats	0	7	0	7	14
#4 Grizzlies	17	17	14	0	48

=== South Dakota ===
	1	2	3	4	Total
Coyotes	0	3	7	10	20
#4 Grizzlies	7	0	14	7	28

=== @ North Dakota State ===
	1	2	3	4	Total
#4 Grizzlies	0	10	0	0	10
#1 Bison	6	6	7	3	22

=== Northern Colorado ===
	1	2	3	4	Total
Bears	7	3	3	0	13
#7 Grizzlies	28	7	3	0	38

=== @ North Dakota ===
	1	2	3	4	Total
#7 Grizzlies	2	6	7	3	18
North Dakota	0	0	0	15	15

=== UC Davis ===
	1	2	3	4	Total
Aggies	0	14	0	14	28
#7 Grizzlies	7	7	14	14	42

=== @ Cal Poly ===
	1	2	3	4	Total
#7 Grizzlies	0	14	0	7	21
Mustangs	7	7	13	14	41

=== Sacramento State ===
	1	2	3	4	Total
Hornets	3	3	0	7	13
#12 Grizzlies	7	10	14	0	31

=== @ Eastern Washington ===
	1	2	3	4	Total
#11 Grizzlies	3	7	13	3	26
#5 Eagles	13	7	13	3	36

=== @ Southern Utah ===
	1	2	3	4	Total
#16 Grizzlies	0	14	7	14	35
Thunderbirds	0	14	3	0	17

=== Montana State ===
	1	2	3	4	Total
#12 Bobcats	0	0	0	7	7
#13 Grizzlies	17	10	0	7	34

== FCS Playoffs ==
=== First Round–San Diego ===
	1	2	3	4	Total
Toreros	0	0	0	14	14
#12 Grizzlies	14	24	7	7	52

=== Second Round–@ Eastern Washington ===
	1	2	3	4	Total
#12 Grizzlies	3	0	7	10	20
#4 Eagles	7	6	14	10	37

== Ranking movements ==
Ranking movements Legend: ██ Increase in ranking ██ Decrease in ranking
	Week														
Poll	Pre	1	2	3	4	5	6	7	8	9	10	11	12	13	Final
Sports Network	5	4	4	4	7	7	7	7	7	12	11	16	13	12	13
Coaches	5	5	4	3	6	7	7	6	6	11	10	15	13	11	11
