= 2014 Southern Utah Thunderbirds football team =

American college football season

2014 Southern Utah Thunderbirds football
- Conference: Big Sky Conference
- Record: 3–9 (3–5 Big Sky)
- Head coach: Ed Lamb (7th season)
- Offensive coordinator: Gary Crowton (1st season)
- Defensive coordinator: Demario Warren (1st season)
- Home stadium: Eccles Coliseum

2014 Big Sky Conference football standings
	Conf.			Overall
Team	W		L	W		L
No. 4 Eastern Washington $^	7	–	1	11	–	3
No. 13 Montana ^	6	–	2	9	–	5
No. 20 Montana State ^	6	–	2	8	–	5
No. 25 Idaho State	6	–	2	8	–	4
Cal Poly	5	–	3	7	–	5
Northern Arizona	5	–	3	7	–	5
Sacramento State	4	–	4	7	–	5
North Dakota	3	–	5	5	–	7
Southern Utah	3	–	5	3	–	9
Northern Colorado	2	–	6	3	–	8
Portland State	2	–	6	3	–	9
Weber State	2	–	6	2	–	10
UC Davis	1	–	7	2	–	9
$ – Conference champion; ^ – FCS playoff participant; Rankings from The Sports Network poll

The 2014 Southern Utah Thunderbirds football team represented Southern Utah University in the 2014 NCAA Division I FCS football season. They were led by seventh-year head coach Ed Lamb and played their home games at Eccles Coliseum. This was their third year as a member of the Big Sky Conference. They finished the season 3–9, 3–5 in Big Sky play to finish in a tie for eighth place.

== Schedule ==
Date	Time	Opponent	Site	TV	Result	Attendance
August 30	1:00 pm	at Nevada*	Mackay Stadium; Reno, NV	Campus Insiders	L 19–28	21,021
September 6	6:00 pm	at No. 3 Southeastern Louisiana*	Strawberry Stadium; Hammond, LA		L 14–41	7,105
September 13	6:05 pm	No. 11 South Dakota State*^{†}	Eccles Coliseum; Cedar City, UT	BSTV	L 6–26	5,017
September 20	8:00 pm	at Fresno State*	Bulldog Stadium; Fresno, CA	MWN	L 16–56	32,645
September 27	6:05 pm	Weber State	Eccles Coliseum; Cedar Park, UT	BSTV	W 31–28	3,238
October 4	7:00 pm	at Cal Poly	Alex G. Spanos Stadium; San Luis Obispo, CA	BSTV	L 39–42	6,086
October 11	1:05 pm	No. 2 Eastern Washington	Eccles Coliseum; Cedar City, UT	BSTV	L 30–42	2,450
October 18	2:00 pm	at Idaho State	Holt Arena; Pocatello, ID	BSTV	L 28–56	6,155
October 25	1:05 pm	North Dakota	Eccles Coliseum; Cedar City, UT	BSTV	W 35–17	2,521
November 8	3:00 pm	at Sacramento State	Hornet Stadium; Sacramento, CA	BSTV	L 21–42	4,833
November 15	1:05 pm	No. 16 Montana	Eccles Coliseum; Cedar City, UT	BSTV	L 17–35	3,079
November 22	2:00 pm	at Northern Arizona	Walkup Skydome; Flagstaff, AZ (Grand Canyon Rivalry)	BSTV	W 22–14	5,657
*Non-conference game; ^{†}Homecoming; Rankings from The Sports Network Poll released prior to the game; All times are in Mountain time
