= 2014 Northern Arizona Lumberjacks football team =

American college football season

2014 Northern Arizona Lumberjacks football
- Conference: Big Sky Conference
- Record: 7–5 (5–3 Big Sky)
- Head coach: Jerome Souers (17th season)
- Offensive coordinator: Rich Scangarello (3rd season)
- Defensive coordinator: Andy Thompson (6th season)
- Home stadium: Walkup Skydome

2014 Big Sky Conference football standings
	Conf.			Overall
Team	W		L	W		L
No. 4 Eastern Washington $^	7	–	1	11	–	3
No. 13 Montana ^	6	–	2	9	–	5
No. 20 Montana State ^	6	–	2	8	–	5
No. 25 Idaho State	6	–	2	8	–	4
Cal Poly	5	–	3	7	–	5
Northern Arizona	5	–	3	7	–	5
Sacramento State	4	–	4	7	–	5
North Dakota	3	–	5	5	–	7
Southern Utah	3	–	5	3	–	9
Northern Colorado	2	–	6	3	–	8
Portland State	2	–	6	3	–	9
Weber State	2	–	6	2	–	10
UC Davis	1	–	7	2	–	9
$ – Conference champion; ^ – FCS playoff participant; Rankings from The Sports Network poll

The 2014 Northern Arizona Lumberjacks football team represented Northern Arizona University in the 2014 NCAA Division I FCS football season. They were led by 17th-year head coach Jerome Souers and played their home games at the Walkup Skydome. They were a member of the Big Sky Conference. They finished the season 7–5, 5–3 in Big Sky play to finish in a tie for fifth place.

== Schedule ==
Date	Time	Opponent	Rank	Site	TV	Result	Attendance
August 30	4:00 pm	at San Diego State*	No. 23	Qualcomm Stadium; San Diego, CA	CBSSN	L 7–38	30,761
September 6	4:00 pm	at Abilene Christian*	No. 25	Shotwell Stadium; Abilene, TX		W 27–21	10,500
September 13	4:00 pm	New Mexico Highlands*	No. 24	Walkup Skydome; Flagstaff, AZ	BSTV	W 62–23	9,505
September 20	12:00 pm	at South Dakota*	No. 22	DakotaDome; Vermillion, SD		L 21–28	8,314
September 27	4:00 pm	Cal Poly		Walkup Skydome; Flagstaff, AZ	BSTV	W 38–35	11,545
October 4	12:30 pm	at Northern Colorado		Nottingham Field; Greeley, CO	BSTV	L 17–24	6,348
October 18	4:00 pm	at Portland State		Providence Park; Portland, OR	RTNW	W 21–17	4,083
October 25	12:40 pm	No. 2 Eastern Washington^{†}		Walkup Skydome; Flagstaff, AZ	RTNW	W 28–27	9,699
November 1	12:00 pm	at Weber State		Stewart Stadium; Ogden, UT	BSTV	W 29–22	6,304
November 8	2:00 pm	UC Davis	No. 25	Walkup Skydome; Flagstaff, AZ	BSTV	W 23–21	4,722
November 15	11:00 am	at North Dakota	No. 22	Alerus Center; Grand Forks, ND	BSTV	L 28–30	5,916
November 22	2:00 pm	Southern Utah		Walkup Skydome; Flagstaff, AZ (Grand Canyon Rivalry)	BSTV	L 14–22	5,657
*Non-conference game; ^{†}Homecoming; Rankings from The Sports Network Poll released prior to the game; All times are in Mountain time

== Ranking movements ==
Ranking movements Legend: ██ Increase in ranking ██ Decrease in ranking — = Not ranked RV = Received votes
	Week														
Poll	Pre	1	2	3	4	5	6	7	8	9	10	11	12	13	Final
Sports Network	23	25	24	22	RV	RV	RV	RV	RV	RV	25	22	RV	RV	RV
Coaches	25	RV	RV	23	RV	25	RV	—	RV	RV	RV	RV	RV	—	RV
