= 2014 Eastern Washington Eagles football team =

American college football season

2014 Eastern Washington Eagles football

Big Sky champion

NCAA Division I Quarterfinal, L 46–59 vs. Illinois State
- Conference: Big Sky Conference

Ranking
- Sports Network: No. 4
- FCS Coaches: No. 4
- Record: 11–3 (7–1 Big Sky)
- Head coach: Beau Baldwin (7th season)
- Offensive coordinator: Aaron Best (7th season)
- Defensive coordinator: John Graham (7th season)
- Home stadium: Roos Field

2014 Big Sky Conference football standings
	Conf.			Overall
Team	W		L	W		L
No. 4 Eastern Washington $^	7	–	1	11	–	3
No. 13 Montana ^	6	–	2	9	–	5
No. 20 Montana State ^	6	–	2	8	–	5
No. 25 Idaho State	6	–	2	8	–	4
Cal Poly	5	–	3	7	–	5
Northern Arizona	5	–	3	7	–	5
Sacramento State	4	–	4	7	–	5
North Dakota	3	–	5	5	–	7
Southern Utah	3	–	5	3	–	9
Northern Colorado	2	–	6	3	–	8
Portland State	2	–	6	3	–	9
Weber State	2	–	6	2	–	10
UC Davis	1	–	7	2	–	9
$ – Conference champion; ^ – FCS playoff participant; Rankings from The Sports Network poll

The 2014 Eastern Washington Eagles football team represented Eastern Washington University in the 2014 NCAA Division I FCS football season. The team was coached by Beau Baldwin, who was in his seventh season with Eastern Washington. The Eagles played their home games at Roos Field in Cheney, Washington and were a member of the Big Sky Conference. They finished the season 11–3, 7–1 in Big Sky to become Big Sky Conference champions. They received the conference's automatic bid to the FCS Playoffs where they defeated fellow Big Sky member Montana in the second round before losing in the quarterfinals to Illinois State.

== Schedule ==
Date	Time	Opponent	Rank	Site	TV	Result	Attendance
August 23	12:30 pm	No. 17 Sam Houston State*	No. 1	Roos Field; Cheney, WA (FCS Kickoff)	ESPN	W 56–35	10,310
August 30	6:05 pm	Montana Western*	No. 1	Roos Field; Cheney, WA	SWX	W 41–9	9,116
September 6	12:05 pm	at Washington*	No. 2	Husky Stadium; Seattle, WA	P12N	L 52–59	62,861
September 20	12:05 pm	at No. 14 Montana State*	No. 2	Bobcat Stadium; Bozeman, MT	RTNW	W 52–51	19,377
September 27	6:05 pm	at UC Davis	No. 2	Aggie Stadium; Davis, CA	BSTV	W 37–14	6,954
October 4	1:35 pm	Idaho State	No. 2	Roos Field; Cheney, WA	SWX	W 56–53	11,256
October 11	12:05 pm	at Southern Utah	No. 2	Eccles Coliseum; Cedar City, UT	BSTV	W 42–30	2,450
October 18	1:05 pm	Northern Colorado	No. 2	Roos Field; Cheney, WA	SWX	W 26–18	10,064
October 25	12:35 pm	at Northern Arizona	No. 2	Walkup Skydome; Flagstaff, AZ	RTNW	L 27–28	9,699
November 1	2:05 pm	North Dakota^{†}	No. 6	Roos Field; Cheney, WA	SWX	W 54–3	9,212
November 8	12:05 pm	No. 11 Montana	No. 5	Roos Field; Cheney, WA (EWU–UM Governors Cup)	RTNW	W 36–26	11,339
November 21	7:05 pm	at Portland State	No. 5	Providence Park; Portland, OR (The Dam Cup)	RTNW	W 56–34	5,955
December 6	1:30 pm	No. 12 Montana*	No. 4	Roos Field; Cheney, WA (NCAA Division I Second Round)	ESPN3	W 37–20	7,919
December 13	1:00 pm	No. 7 Illinois State*	No. 4	Roos Field; Cheney, WA (NCAA Division I Quarterfinal)	ESPN3	L 46–59	6,239
*Non-conference game; ^{†}Homecoming; Rankings from The Sports Network Poll released prior to the game; All times are in Pacific time

Despite also being a member of the Big Sky Conference, the game with Montana State on September 20 is considered a non conference game.

== Game summaries ==
=== Sam Houston State ===
#14 Sam Houston State at #2 Eastern Washington

Team	1	2	3	4	Total
Bearkats	0	21	0	14	35
• Eagles	7	14	7	28	56

- Date: August 23
- Location: Roos Field
  Cheney, Washington
- Game start: 12:35 PM PST
- Elapsed time: 3:57
- Game attendance: 10,310
- Game weather: 72 °F (22 °C), Sunny, winds NE at 8mph
- Referee: Gregg Wilson
- TV announcers (ESPN): Mark Jones, Rod Gilmore, Colin Cowherd, & Jessica Mendoza

Scoring summary
1	6:35	EWU	Blair Bomber 3-yard touchdown reception from Vernon Adams, Roldan Alcobendas kick good	EWU 7–0
2	14:51	SHSU	Keshawn Hill 79-yard touchdown run, Luc Swimberghe kick good	Tied 7–7
2	14:34	SHSU	Interception returned 55 yards for touchdown by Trenier Orr, Swimberghe kick good	SHSU 14–7
2	12:04	EWU	Kendrick Bourne 13-yard touchdown reception from Adams, Alcobendas kick good	Tied 14–14
2	10:53	SHSU	Jared Johnson 53-yard touchdown run, Swimberghe kick good	SHSU 21–14
2	6:33	EWU	Jalen Moore 34-yard touchdown run, Alcobendas kick good	Tied 21–21
3	9:28	EWU	Bomber 3-yard touchdown reception from Adams, Alcobendas kick good	EWU 28–21
4	14:50	EWU	Zach Wimberly 1-yard touchdown run, Alcobendas kick good	EWU 35–21
4	12:21	SHSU	Derreck Edwards 6-yard touchdown reception from Johnson, Swimberghe kick good	EWU 35–28
4	8:44	EWU	Cooper Kupp 5-yard touchdown reception from Jordan West, Alcobendas kick good	EWU 42–28
4	5:14	SHSU	Shane Young 1-yard touchdown reception from Johnson, Swimberghe kick good	EWU 42–35
4	3:13	EWU	Bourne 13-yard touchdown reception from Adams, Alcobendas kick good	EWU 49–35
4	0:31	EWU	Moore 1-yard touchdown run, Alcobendas kick good	EWU 56–35

=== Montana Western ===
Montana Western at #2 Eastern Washington

Team	1	2	3	4	Total
Bulldogs	0	3	6	0	9
• Eagles	14	13	14	0	41

- Date: August 30
- Location: Roos Field
  Cheney, Washington
- Game attendance: 9,116
- TV announcers (SWX): Greg Heister & Bill Ames

=== Washington ===
#2 Eastern Washington at Washington

Team	1	2	3	4	Total
Eagles	14	17	14	7	52
• Huskies	24	13	7	15	59

- Date: September 6
- Location: Husky Stadium
  Seattle
- TV announcers (P12 WA & OR): Roxy Bernstein, Anthony Herron & Drea Avent

=== Montana State ===
#2 Eastern Washington at #14 Montana State

Team	1	2	3	4	Total
• Eagles	14	13	10	15	52
Bobcats	23	7	14	7	51

- Date: September 20
- Location: Bobcat Stadium
  Bozeman, Montana
- Game attendance: 19,377
- Television network: RTNW

=== UC Davis ===
#2 Eastern Washington at UC Davis

Team	1	2	3	4	Total
• Eagles	6	3	21	7	37
Aggies	0	7	7	0	14

- Date: September 27
- Location: Aggie Stadium
  Davis, California
- Game attendance: 6,954

=== Idaho State ===
Idaho State at #2 Eastern Washington

Team	1	2	3	4	Total
Bengals	14	17	7	15	53
• Eagles	21	14	14	7	56

- Date: October 4
- Location: Roos Field
  Cheney, Washington
- TV announcers (SWX): Greg Heister & Bill Ames

=== Southern Utah ===
#2 Eastern Washington at Southern Utah

Team	1	2	3	4	Total
• Eagles	7	14	14	7	42
Thunderbirds	14	3	7	6	30

- Date: October 11
- Location: Eccles Coliseum
  Cedar City, Utah
- Game attendance: 2,450

=== Northern Colorado ===
Northern Colorado at #2 Eastern Washington

Team	1	2	3	4	Total
Bears	0	3	7	8	18
• Eagles	7	6	7	6	26

- Date: October 18
- Location: Roos Field
  Cheney, Washington
- Game attendance: 10,064
- TV announcers (SWX): Greg Heister & Bill Ames

=== Northern Arizona ===
#2 Eastern Washington at Northern Arizona

Team	1	2	3	4	Total
Eagles	7	7	10	3	27
• Lumberjacks	0	12	7	9	28

- Date: October 25
- Location: Walkup Skydome
  Flagstaff, Arizona
- Game attendance: 9,699
- Television network: RTNW

=== North Dakota ===
North Dakota at #6 Eastern Washington

Team	1	2	3	4	Total
North Dakota	0	3	0	0	3
• Eagles	7	31	3	13	54

- Date: November 1
- Location: Roos Field
  Cheney, Washington
- Game attendance: 9,212
- TV announcers (SWX): Greg Heister & Bill Ames

=== Montana ===
#11 Montana at #5 Eastern Washington

Team	1	2	3	4	Total
Grizzlies	3	7	13	3	26
• Eagles	13	7	13	3	36

- Date: November 8
- Location: Roos Field
  Cheney, Washington
- Game start: 12:00 PM PST
- Game attendance: 11,339
- Television network: RTNW

=== Portland State ===
#5 Eastern Washington at Portland State

Team	1	2	3	4	Total
• Eagles	7	7	21	21	56
Vikings	0	14	6	14	34

- Date: October 25
- Location: Providence Park
  Portland, Oregon
- Game start: 7:05 PM PST
- Game attendance: 5,955
- Television network: RTNW

== FCS Playoffs ==
=== FCS Playoffs Second Round ===
#12 Montana Grizzlies at #4 Eastern Washington

Team	1	2	3	4	Total
Grizzlies	3	0	7	10	20
• Eagles	7	6	14	10	37

- Date: December 6
- Location: Roos Field
  Cheney, Washington
- Game start: 1:30 PM PST
- Television network: ESPN3

=== FCS Playoffs Quarterfinals ===
#7 Illinois State Redbirds at #4 Eastern Washington

Team	1	2	3	4	Total
• Redbirds	10	14	21	14	59
Eagles	7	10	3	26	46

- Date: December 13
- Location: Roos Field
  Cheney, Washington
- Game start: 1:00 PM PST
- Television network: ESPN3

== Ranking movements ==
Ranking movements Legend: ██ Increase in ranking ██ Decrease in ranking ( ) = First-place votes
	Week														
Poll	Pre	1	2	3	4	5	6	7	8	9	10	11	12	13	Final
Sports Network	1 (82)	2 (63)	2 (21)	2 (15)	2 (9)	2 (3)	2 (3)	2 (4)	2 (2)	6	5	5	5	4	4
Coaches	2 (6)	2 (2)	2	2 (1)	2	2	2 (1)	2	2	7	5	5	5	4	4
