= 2014 Weber State Wildcats football team =

American college football season

2014 Weber State Wildcats football
- Conference: Big Sky Conference
- Record: 2–10 (2–6 Big Sky)
- Head coach: Jay Hill (1st season)
- Offensive coordinator: Steve Clark (1st season)
- Defensive coordinator: Justin Ena (1st season)
- Home stadium: Stewart Stadium

2014 Big Sky Conference football standings
	Conf.			Overall
Team	W		L	W		L
No. 4 Eastern Washington $^	7	–	1	11	–	3
No. 13 Montana ^	6	–	2	9	–	5
No. 20 Montana State ^	6	–	2	8	–	5
No. 25 Idaho State	6	–	2	8	–	4
Cal Poly	5	–	3	7	–	5
Northern Arizona	5	–	3	7	–	5
Sacramento State	4	–	4	7	–	5
North Dakota	3	–	5	5	–	7
Southern Utah	3	–	5	3	–	9
Northern Colorado	2	–	6	3	–	8
Portland State	2	–	6	3	–	9
Weber State	2	–	6	2	–	10
UC Davis	1	–	7	2	–	9
$ – Conference champion; ^ – FCS playoff participant; Rankings from The Sports Network poll

The 2014 Weber State Wildcats football team represented Weber State University in the 2014 NCAA Division I FCS football season. The Wildcats were led by first-year head coach Jay Hill. Weber State played their home games at Stewart Stadium and were members of the Big Sky Conference. They finished the season 2–10, 2–6 in Big Sky play to finish in a three-way tie for tenth place with Northern Colorado and Portland State.

== Schedule ==
Date	Time	Opponent	Site	TV	Result	Attendance
August 28	8:30 pm	at No. 19 (FBS) Arizona State*	Sun Devil Stadium; Tempe, AZ	P12N	L 14–45	52,133
September 6	6:00 pm	No. 1 North Dakota State*	Stewart Stadium; Ogden, UT	ALT	L 7–24	14,577
September 13	7:00 pm	at Sacramento State*	Hornet Stadium; Sacramento, CA	BSTV	L 31–42	6,595
September 20	5:00 pm	at Stephen F. Austin*	Homer Bryce Stadium; Nacogdoches, TX		L 20–35	11,816
September 27	6:00 pm	at Southern Utah	Eccles Coliseum; Cedar City, UT	BSTV	L 28–31	3,238
October 11	1:00 pm	Cal Poly	Stewart Stadium; Ogden, UT	KJZZ	L 24–30	8,613
October 18	3:30 pm	at No. 9 Montana State	Bobcat Stadium; Bozeman, MT	BSTV	L 13–23	19,677
October 25	1:00 pm	Portland State	Stewart Stadium; Ogden, UT	BSTV	L 17–30	6,862
November 1	1:00 pm	Northern Arizona	Stewart Stadium; Ogden, UT	BSTV	L 22–29	6,304
November 8	11:00 am	at North Dakota	Alerus Center; Grand Forks, ND	BSTV	W 24–12	5,932
November 15	1:00 pm	Northern Colorado	Stewart Stadium; Ogden, UT	BSTV	W 34–21	6,166
November 22	2:30 pm	at Idaho State	Holt Arena; Pocatello, ID	BSTV	L 28–46	7,933
*Non-conference game; Rankings from The Sports Network Poll released prior to the game; All times are in Mountain time

Despite also being a member of the Big Sky Conference, the game with Sacramento State on September 13 is considered a non conference game and will have no effect on the Big Sky Standings.

== Game summaries ==
=== Arizona State ===
	1	2	3	4	Total
Wildcats	0	0	7	7	14
#19 Sun Devils	17	14	14	0	45

Referee was Steven Strimling.
