= 2014 Cal Poly Mustangs football team =

American college football season

2014 Cal Poly Mustangs football
- Conference: Big Sky Conference
- Record: 7–5 (5–3 Big Sky)
- Head coach: Tim Walsh (6th season)
- Offensive coordinator: Saga Tuitele (6th season)
- Offensive scheme: Spread triple-option
- Defensive coordinator: Josh Brown (3rd season)
- Base defense: Multiple 4–3
- Home stadium: Alex G. Spanos Stadium

2014 Big Sky Conference football standings
	Conf.			Overall
Team	W		L	W		L
No. 4 Eastern Washington $^	7	–	1	11	–	3
No. 13 Montana ^	6	–	2	9	–	5
No. 20 Montana State ^	6	–	2	8	–	5
No. 25 Idaho State	6	–	2	8	–	4
Cal Poly	5	–	3	7	–	5
Northern Arizona	5	–	3	7	–	5
Sacramento State	4	–	4	7	–	5
North Dakota	3	–	5	5	–	7
Southern Utah	3	–	5	3	–	9
Northern Colorado	2	–	6	3	–	8
Portland State	2	–	6	3	–	9
Weber State	2	–	6	2	–	10
UC Davis	1	–	7	2	–	9
$ – Conference champion; ^ – FCS playoff participant; Rankings from The Sports Network poll

The 2014 Cal Poly Mustangs football team represented California Polytechnic State University, San Luis Obispo as member of the Big Sky Conference during the 2014 NCAA Division I FCS football season. Led by sixth-year head coach Tim Walsh, Cal Poly compiled an overall record of 7–5 with a mark of 5–3 in conference play, tying for fifth place in the Big Sky. The Mustangs played home games at Mustang Stadium in San Luis Obispo, California.

== Schedule ==
Date	Time	Opponent	Rank	Site	TV	Result	Attendance
August 28	5:00 pm	at New Mexico State*		Aggie Memorial Stadium; Las Cruces, NM	ESPN3	L 10–28	13,772
September 6	4:00 pm	at No. 12 South Dakota State*		Coughlin–Alumni Stadium; Brookings, SD		L 18–44	12,219
September 20	6:05 pm	Portland State*		Alex G. Spanos Stadium; San Luis Obispo, CA	BSTV	W 42–14	8,834
September 27	4:00 pm	at Northern Arizona		Walkup Skydome; Flagstaff, AZ	BSTV	L 35–38	11,545
October 4	6:05 pm	Southern Utah		Alex G. Spanos Stadium; San Luis Obispo, CA	BSTV	W 42–39	6,086
October 11	12:00 pm	at Weber State		Stewart Stadium; Ogden, UT	KSBY	W 30–24	8,613
October 18	6:00 pm	at Sacramento State		Hornet Stadium; Sacramento, CA	BSTV	W 56–27	10,934
October 25	6:05 pm	No. 7 Montana		Alex G. Spanos Stadium; San Luis Obispo, CA	KSBY	W 41–21	10,775
November 1	6:05 pm	No. 8 Montana State^{†}		Alex G. Spanos Stadium; San Luis Obispo, CA	KSBY	W 35–27	8,909
November 8	1:35 pm	at Idaho State	No. 21	Holt Arena; Pocatello, ID	BSTV	L 28–30	9,323
November 15	6:05 pm	UC Davis		Alex G. Spanos Stadium; San Luis Obispo, CA (Battle for the Golden Horseshoe)	BSTV	L 35–48	10,121
November 22	4:00 pm	at San Diego*		Torero Stadium; San Diego, CA		W 34–3	4,333
*Non-conference game; ^{†}Homecoming; Rankings from The Sports Network Poll released prior to the game; All times are in Pacific time

The game with Portland State, fellow Big Sky Conference member, on September 20 was considered a non-conference game and had no effect on the Big Sky standings.

== Rankings ==
Ranking movements Legend: ██ Increase in ranking ██ Decrease in ranking — = Not ranked RV = Received votes
	Week														
Poll	Pre	1	2	3	4	5	6	7	8	9	10	11	12	13	Final
Sports Network	RV	RV	RV	RV	RV	—	RV	RV	RV	RV	21	RV	RV	RV	RV
Coaches	RV	RV	—	—	RV	—	—	RV	RV	RV	23	RV	—	RV	RV
