= 2014 Montana State Bobcats football team =

American college football season

2014 Montana State Bobcats football
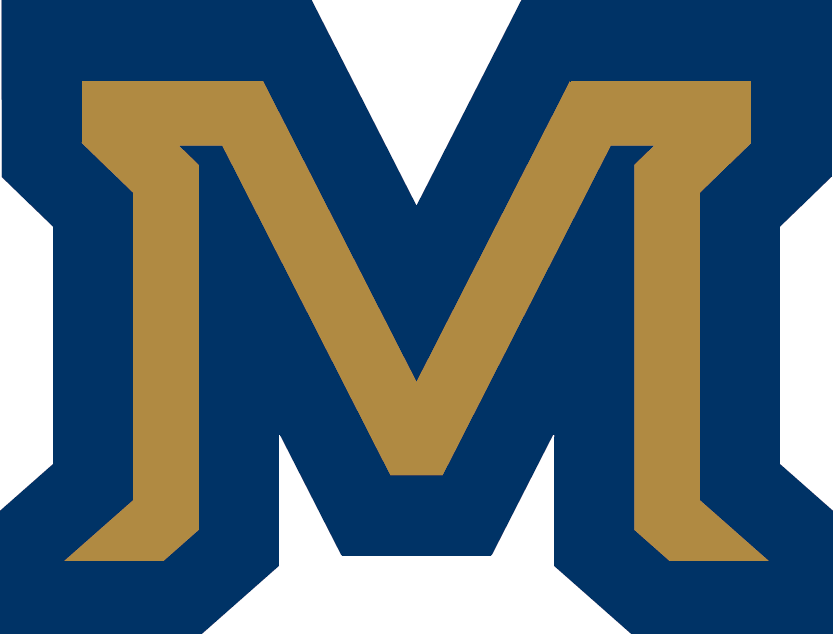

NCAA Division I First Round, L 40–47 vs. South Dakota State
- Conference: Big Sky Conference

Ranking
- Sports Network: No. 20
- FCS Coaches: No. 20
- Record: 8–5 (6–2 Big Sky)
- Head coach: Rob Ash (8th season)
- Offensive coordinator: Tim Cramsey (2nd season)
- Defensive coordinator: Jamie Marshall (8th season)
- Home stadium: Bobcat Stadium

2014 Big Sky Conference football standings
	Conf.			Overall
Team	W		L	W		L
No. 4 Eastern Washington $^	7	–	1	11	–	3
No. 13 Montana ^	6	–	2	9	–	5
No. 20 Montana State ^	6	–	2	8	–	5
No. 25 Idaho State	6	–	2	8	–	4
Cal Poly	5	–	3	7	–	5
Northern Arizona	5	–	3	7	–	5
Sacramento State	4	–	4	7	–	5
North Dakota	3	–	5	5	–	7
Southern Utah	3	–	5	3	–	9
Northern Colorado	2	–	6	3	–	8
Portland State	2	–	6	3	–	9
Weber State	2	–	6	2	–	10
UC Davis	1	–	7	2	–	9
$ – Conference champion; ^ – FCS playoff participant; Rankings from The Sports Network poll

The 2014 Montana State Bobcats football team represented Montana State University as a member of the Big Sky Conference during the 2014 NCAA Division I FCS football season. Led by eighth-year head coach Rob Ash, the Bobcats compiled an overall record of 8–5 with a mark of 6–2 in conference play, placing in a three-way tie for second place in the Big Sky. Montana State received an at-large bid to the NCAA Division I Football Championship playoffs, where they lost in the first round to South Dakota State. The Bobcats played their home games at Bobcat Stadium in Bozeman, Montana.

== Schedule ==
Date	Time	Opponent	Rank	Site	TV	Result	Attendance
August 30	5:00 pm	at Arkansas State*	No. 18	Centennial Bank Stadium; Jonesboro, AR	ESPN3	L 10–37	26,143
September 6	7:00 pm	Black Hills State*	No. 20	Bobcat Stadium; Bozeman, MT	CMM/ALT2	W 57–10	19,187
September 13	1:30 pm	Central Arkansas*	No. 17	Bobcat Stadium; Bozeman, MT	CMM/ALT2	W 43–33	17,777
September 20	1:00 pm	No. 2 Eastern Washington*	No. 14	Bobcat Stadium; Bozeman, MT	RTNW	L 51–52	19,377
September 27	2:00 pm	North Dakota^{†}	No. 13	Bobcat Stadium; Bozeman, MT	CMM	W 29–18	19,477
October 4	7:00 pm	at Sacramento State	No. 13	Hornet Stadium; Sacramento, CA	CMM	W 59–56	6,473
October 11	5:00 pm	at UC Davis	No. 11	Aggie Stadium; Davis, CA	RTNW	W 77–37	7,152
October 18	3:30 pm	Weber State	No. 9	Bobcat Stadium; Bozeman, MT	CMM	W 23–13	19,677
November 1	7:05 pm	at Cal Poly	No. 8	Alex G. Spanos Stadium; San Luis Obispo, CA	CMM	L 27–35	8,909
November 8	1:30 pm	Portland State	No. 15	Bobcat Stadium; Bozeman, MT	CMM	W 29–22	16,627
November 15	1:30 pm	Idaho State	No. 12	Bobcat Stadium; Bozeman, MT	RTNW	W 44–39	16,577
November 22	3:00 pm	at No. 13 Montana	No. 12	Washington–Grizzly Stadium; Missoula, MT (rivalry)	RTNW	L 7–34	26,352
November 29	2:00 pm	No. 14 South Dakota State*	No. 17	Bobcat Stadium; Bozeman, MT (NCAA Division I First Round)	ESPN3	L 40–47	7,747
*Non-conference game; ^{†}Homecoming; Rankings from The Sports Network Poll released prior to the game; All times are in Mountain time

The game with Eastern Washington on September 20 was not counted as a conference game even though Eastern Washington was also a member of the Big Sky Conference.

== Game summaries ==
=== @ Arkansas State ===
	1	2	3	4	Total
#18 Bobcats	7	0	3	0	10
Red Wolves	10	3	10	14	37

=== Black Hills State ===
	1	2	3	4	Total
Yellow Jackets	0	0	10	0	10
#20 Bobcats	18	24	8	7	57

=== Central Arkansas ===
	1	2	3	4	Total
Bears	0	6	7	20	33
#17 Bobcats	10	13	14	6	43

=== Eastern Washington ===
	1	2	3	4	Total
#2 Eagles	14	13	10	15	52
#14 Bobcats	23	7	14	7	51

=== North Dakota ===
	1	2	3	4	Total
North Dakota	0	7	3	8	18
#13 Bobcats	3	23	0	3	29

=== @ Sacramento State ===
	1	2	3	4	Total
#13 Bobcats	21	0	17	21	59
Hornets	14	0	14	28	56

=== @ UC Davis ===
	1	2	3	4	Total
#11 Bobcats	14	21	28	14	77
Aggies	10	0	20	7	37

=== Weber State ===
	1	2	3	4	Total
Wildcats	0	3	0	10	13
#9 Bobcats	0	7	7	9	23

=== @ Cal Poly ===
	1	2	3	4	Total
#8 Bobcats	7	10	10	0	27
Mustangs	7	7	14	7	35

=== Portland State ===
	1	2	3	4	Total
Vikings	10	3	2	7	22
#15 Bobcats	15	7	0	7	29

=== Idaho State ===
	1	2	3	4	Total
Bengals	14	16	0	9	39
#12 Bobcats	7	16	14	7	44

=== @ Montana ===
	1	2	3	4	Total
#12 Bobcats	0	0	0	7	7
#13 Grizzlies	17	10	0	7	34

== FCS Playoffs ==
=== First Round–South Dakota State ===
	1	2	3	4	Total
#14 Jackrabbits	14	10	7	16	47
#17 Bobcats	6	14	6	14	40

== Ranking movements ==
Ranking movements Legend: ██ Increase in ranking ██ Decrease in ranking
	Week														
Poll	Pre	1	2	3	4	5	6	7	8	9	10	11	12	13	Final
Sports Network	18	20	17	14	13	13	11	9	10	8	15	12	12	17	20
Coaches	19	23	18	16	17	15	14	11	11	9	16	13	12	17	20
