= 2014 Northern Colorado Bears football team =

American college football season

2014 Northern Colorado Bears football
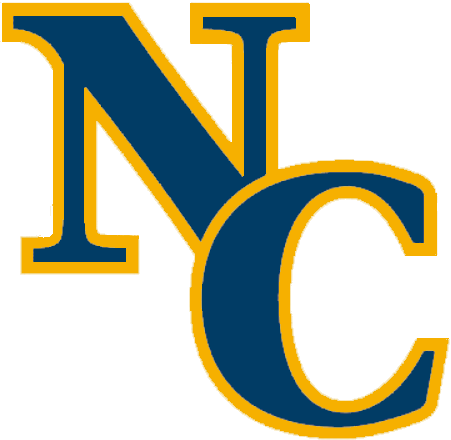
- Conference: Big Sky Conference
- Record: 3–8 (2–6 Big Sky)
- Head coach: Earnest Collins Jr. (4th season)
- Offensive coordinator: Michael Armour (4th season)
- Offensive scheme: Spread
- Defensive coordinator: Scott Aligo (1st season)
- Base defense: 4–3
- Home stadium: Nottingham Field

2014 Big Sky Conference football standings
	Conf.			Overall
Team	W		L	W		L
No. 4 Eastern Washington $^	7	–	1	11	–	3
No. 13 Montana ^	6	–	2	9	–	5
No. 20 Montana State ^	6	–	2	8	–	5
No. 25 Idaho State	6	–	2	8	–	4
Cal Poly	5	–	3	7	–	5
Northern Arizona	5	–	3	7	–	5
Sacramento State	4	–	4	7	–	5
North Dakota	3	–	5	5	–	7
Southern Utah	3	–	5	3	–	9
Northern Colorado	2	–	6	3	–	8
Portland State	2	–	6	3	–	9
Weber State	2	–	6	2	–	10
UC Davis	1	–	7	2	–	9
$ – Conference champion; ^ – FCS playoff participant; Rankings from The Sports Network poll

The 2014 Northern Colorado Bears football team represented the University of Northern Colorado in the 2014 NCAA Division I FCS football season. They were led by fourth-year head coach Earnest Collins Jr. and played their home games at Nottingham Field. They were a member of the Big Sky Conference. They finished the season 3–8, 2–6 in Big Sky play to finish in a three-way tie for tenth place.

== Schedule ==
Date	Time	Opponent	Site	TV	Result	Attendance
September 6	8:00 pm	at UNLV*	Sam Boyd Stadium; Whitney, Nevada	MWN	L 12–13	17,289
September 13	1:30 pm	Houston Baptist*	Nottingham Field; Greeley, Colorado	BSTV	W 28–20	4,080
September 20	3:00 pm	at No. 11 Northern Iowa*	UNI-Dome; Cedar Falls, Iowa	KGCW	L 7–46	15,227
September 27	1:00 pm	at No. 7 Montana	Washington–Grizzly Stadium; Missoula, Montana	RTRM	L 13–38	25,269
October 4	1:30 pm	Northern Arizona^{†}	Nottingham Field; Greeley, Colorado	BSTV	W 24–17	6,348
October 11	1:30 pm	Sacramento State	Nottingham Field; Greeley, Colorado	BSTV	L 38–43	2,701
October 18	2:05 pm	at No. 2 Eastern Washington	Roos Field; Cheney, Washington	SWX	L 18–26	10,064
October 25	1:30 pm	Idaho State	Nottingham Field; Greeley, Colorado	BSTV	L 12–46	4,210
November 1	5:00 pm	at UC Davis	Aggie Stadium; Davis, California	BSTV	W 27–21	5,856
November 15	1:00 pm	at Weber State	Stewart Stadium; Ogden, Utah	BSTV	L 21–34	6,166
November 22	12:30 pm	North Dakota	Nottingham Field; Greeley, Colorado	BSTV	L 14–33	3,698
*Non-conference game; ^{†}Homecoming; Rankings from The Sports Network Poll released prior to the game; All times are in Mountain time

- Source: Schedule

== Game summaries ==
=== @ UNLV ===
	1	2	3	4	Total
Bears	0	3	7	2	12
Rebels	7	3	3	0	13

=== Houston Baptist ===
	1	2	3	4	Total
Huskies	3	7	10	0	20
Bears	7	8	0	13	28

=== @ Northern Iowa ===
	1	2	3	4	Total
Bears	0	0	7	0	7
#11 Panthers	10	26	3	7	46

=== @ Montana ===
	1	2	3	4	Total
Bears	7	3	3	0	13
#7 Grizzlies	28	7	3	0	38

=== Northern Arizona ===
	1	2	3	4	Total
Lumberjacks	7	3	0	7	17
Bears	0	3	14	7	24

=== Sacramento State ===
	1	2	3	4	Total
Hornets	7	13	17	6	43
Bears	10	7	13	8	38

=== @ Eastern Washington ===
	1	2	3	4	Total
Bears	0	3	7	8	18
#2 Eagles	7	6	7	6	26

=== Idaho State ===
	1	2	3	4	Total
Bengals	10	14	15	7	46
Bears	0	0	12	0	12

=== @ UC Davis ===
	1	2	3	4	Total
Bears	0	7	14	6	27
Mustangs	0	0	7	14	21

=== @ Weber State ===
	1	2	3	4	Total
Bears	7	7	0	7	21
Wildcats	14	10	10	0	34

=== North Dakota ===
	1	2	3	4	Total
UND	7	10	10	6	33
Bears	0	0	7	7	14
