= 2014 Portland State Vikings football team =

American college football season

2014 Portland State Vikings football
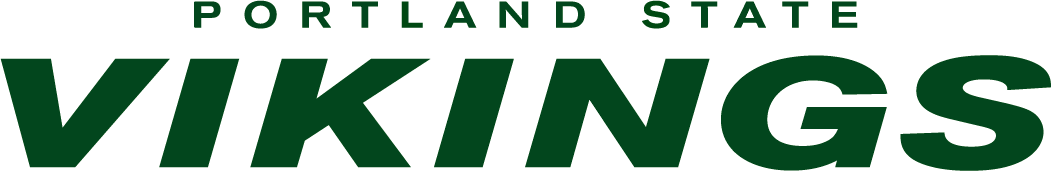
- Conference: Big Sky Conference
- Record: 3–9 (2–6 Big Sky)
- Head coach: Nigel Burton (5th season)
- Offensive coordinator: Bruce Barnum (5th season)
- Offensive scheme: Pistol
- Defensive coordinator: Jaime Hill (2nd season)
- Base defense: 3–4
- Home stadium: Providence Park

2014 Big Sky Conference football standings
	Conf.			Overall
Team	W		L	W		L
No. 4 Eastern Washington $^	7	–	1	11	–	3
No. 13 Montana ^	6	–	2	9	–	5
No. 20 Montana State ^	6	–	2	8	–	5
No. 25 Idaho State	6	–	2	8	–	4
Cal Poly	5	–	3	7	–	5
Northern Arizona	5	–	3	7	–	5
Sacramento State	4	–	4	7	–	5
North Dakota	3	–	5	5	–	7
Southern Utah	3	–	5	3	–	9
Northern Colorado	2	–	6	3	–	8
Portland State	2	–	6	3	–	9
Weber State	2	–	6	2	–	10
UC Davis	1	–	7	2	–	9
$ – Conference champion; ^ – FCS playoff participant; Rankings from The Sports Network poll

The 2014 Portland State Vikings football team represented Portland State University in the 2014 NCAA Division I FCS football season. They were led by fifth year head coach Nigel Burton and played their home games at Providence Park. They were a member of the Big Sky Conference. They finished the season 3–9, 2–6 in Big Sky play to finish in a three-way tie for tenth place.

On November 26, head coach Nigel Burton was fired. He finished at Portland State with a five-year record of 21–36.

== Schedule ==
Date	Time	Opponent	Site	TV	Result	Attendance
August 30	1:00 pm	at Oregon State*	Reser Stadium; Corvallis, OR	P12N	L 14–29	40,309
September 6	7:15 pm	Western Oregon*	Hillsboro Stadium; Hillsboro, OR		W 45–38	4,241
September 13	5:00 pm	at Washington State*	Martin Stadium; Pullman, WA	P12N	L 21–59	30,874
September 20	6:05 pm	at Cal Poly*	Alex G. Spanos Stadium; San Luis Obispo, CA	BSTV	L 14–42	8,834
October 4	4:35 pm	UC Davis	Providence Park; Portland, OR	RTNW	W 23–14	5,442
October 11	11:30 am	at North Dakota	Alerus Center; Grand Forks, ND	BSTV	L 16–24	7,894
October 18	4:05 pm	Northern Arizona^{†}	Providence Park; Portland, OR	RTNW	L 17–21	4,083
October 25	12:00 pm	at Weber State	Stewart Stadium; Ogden, UT	BSTV	W 30–17	6,862
November 1	4:35 pm	Idaho State	Providence Park; Portland, OR	BSTV	L 13–31	3,193
November 8	1:05 pm	at No. 15 Montana State	Bobcat Stadium; Bozeman, MT	BSTV	L 22–29	16,627
November 15	2:00 pm	at Sacramento State	Hornet Stadium; Sacramento, CA	BSTV	L 41–48	5,227
November 21	7:05 pm	No. 5 Eastern Washington	Providence Park; Portland, OR (The Dam Cup)	RTNW	L 34–56	5,955
*Non-conference game; ^{†}Homecoming; Rankings from The Sports Network Poll released prior to the game; All times are in Pacific time

Despite also being a member of the Big Sky Conference, the game with Cal Poly on September 20 is considered a non conference game and will have no effect on the Big Sky Standings.

== Game summaries ==
=== @ Oregon State ===
	1	2	3	4	Total
Vikings	0	14	0	0	14
Beavers	6	7	13	3	29

=== Western Oregon ===
	1	2	3	4	Total
Wolves	0	14	10	14	38
Vikings	10	14	7	14	45

=== @ Washington State ===
	1	2	3	4	Total
Vikings	0	0	14	7	21
Cougars	7	21	7	24	59

=== @ Cal Poly ===
	1	2	3	4	Total
Vikings	0	0	0	14	14
Mustangs	7	14	14	7	42

=== UC Davis ===
	1	2	3	4	Total
Aggies	0	0	14	0	14
Vikings	3	14	0	6	23

=== @ North Dakota ===
	1	2	3	4	Total
Vikings	7	6	0	3	16
North Dakota	3	0	14	7	24

=== Northern Arizona ===
	1	2	3	4	Total
Lumberjacks	0	14	0	7	21
Vikings	0	7	10	0	17

=== @ Weber State ===
	1	2	3	4	Total
Vikings	7	6	7	10	30
Wildcats	7	0	3	7	17

=== Idaho State ===
	1	2	3	4	Total
Bengals	14	3	7	7	31
Vikings	0	10	0	3	13

=== @ Montana State ===
	1	2	3	4	Total
Vikings	10	3	2	7	22
#15 Bobcats	15	7	0	7	29

=== @ Sacramento State ===
	1	2	3	4	Total
Vikings	10	10	21	0	41
Hornets	10	14	7	17	48

=== Eastern Washington ===
	1	2	3	4	Total
#5 Eagles	7	7	21	21	56
Vikings	0	14	6	14	34
