= 2014 Sacramento State Hornets football team =

American college football season

2014 Sacramento State Hornets football
- Conference: Big Sky Conference
- Record: 7–5 (4–4 Big Sky)
- Head coach: Jody Sears (1st season)
- Offensive coordinator: Paul Peterson (3rd season)
- Home stadium: Hornet Stadium

2014 Big Sky Conference football standings
	Conf.			Overall
Team	W		L	W		L
No. 4 Eastern Washington $^	7	–	1	11	–	3
No. 13 Montana ^	6	–	2	9	–	5
No. 20 Montana State ^	6	–	2	8	–	5
No. 25 Idaho State	6	–	2	8	–	4
Cal Poly	5	–	3	7	–	5
Northern Arizona	5	–	3	7	–	5
Sacramento State	4	–	4	7	–	5
North Dakota	3	–	5	5	–	7
Southern Utah	3	–	5	3	–	9
Northern Colorado	2	–	6	3	–	8
Portland State	2	–	6	3	–	9
Weber State	2	–	6	2	–	10
UC Davis	1	–	7	2	–	9
$ – Conference champion; ^ – FCS playoff participant; Rankings from The Sports Network poll

The 2014 Sacramento State Hornets football team represented California State University, Sacramento as a member of the Big Sky Conference during the 2014 NCAA Division I FCS football season. Led by first-year head coach Jody Sears, Sacramento State compiled an overall record of 7–5 with a mark of 4–4 in conference play, placing seventh in the Big Sky. The Hornets played home games at Hornet Stadium in Sacramento, California.

== Schedule ==
Date	Time	Opponent	Site	TV	Result	Attendance
August 30	4:00 pm	at Incarnate Word*	Gayle and Tom Benson Stadium; San Antonio, TX		W 49–13	4,078
September 6	12:00 pm	at California*	California Memorial Stadium; Berkeley, CA	P12N	L 14–55	48,145
September 13	6:00 pm	Weber State*	Hornet Stadium; Sacramento, CA	BSTV	W 42–31	6,595
September 20	6:00 pm	Menlo*	Hornet Stadium; Sacramento, CA	BSTV	W 59–14	5,754
September 27	1:05 pm	at Idaho State	Holt Arena; Pocatello, ID	BSTV	L 24–44	7,652
October 4	6:00 pm	No. 13 Montana State	Hornet Stadium; Sacramento, CA	BSTV	L 56–59	6,473
October 11	12:30 pm	at Northern Colorado	Nottingham Field; Greeley, CO	BSTV	W 43–38	2,701
October 18	6:00 pm	Cal Poly^{†}	Hornet Stadium; Sacramento, CA	BSTV	L 27–56	10,934
November 1	11:00 am	at No. 12 Montana	Washington–Grizzly Stadium; Missoula, MT	RTNW	L 13–31	24,035
November 8	2:00 pm	Southern Utah	Hornet Stadium; Sacramento, CA	BSTV	W 42–21	4,833
November 15	2:00 pm	Portland State	Hornet Stadium; Sacramento, CA	BSTV	W 48–41	5,227
November 22	1:00 pm	at UC Davis	Aggie Stadium; Davis, CA (Causeway Classic)	BSTV	W 41–30	7,047
*Non-conference game; ^{†}Homecoming; Rankings from The Sports Network Poll released prior to the game; All times are in Pacific time

Despite Weber State also being a member of the Big Sky Conference, the September 13 game against Sacramento State was considered a non-conference game.
