= 2014 Idaho State Bengals football team =

American college football season

2014 Idaho State Bengals football
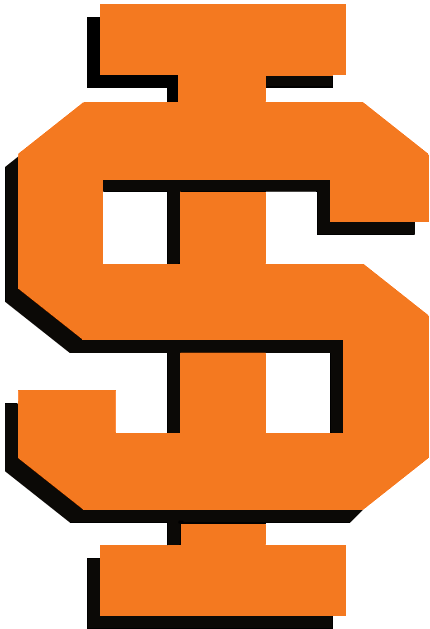
- Conference: Big Sky Conference

Ranking
- Sports Network: No. 25
- Record: 8–4 (6–2 Big Sky)
- Head coach: Mike Kramer (4th season)
- Offensive coordinator: Don Bailey (4th season)
- Co-defensive coordinators: Roger Cooper (3rd season); Spencer Toone (3rd season)
- Home stadium: Holt Arena

2014 Big Sky Conference football standings
	Conf.			Overall
Team	W		L	W		L
No. 4 Eastern Washington $^	7	–	1	11	–	3
No. 13 Montana ^	6	–	2	9	–	5
No. 20 Montana State ^	6	–	2	8	–	5
No. 25 Idaho State	6	–	2	8	–	4
Cal Poly	5	–	3	7	–	5
Northern Arizona	5	–	3	7	–	5
Sacramento State	4	–	4	7	–	5
North Dakota	3	–	5	5	–	7
Southern Utah	3	–	5	3	–	9
Northern Colorado	2	–	6	3	–	8
Portland State	2	–	6	3	–	9
Weber State	2	–	6	2	–	10
UC Davis	1	–	7	2	–	9
$ – Conference champion; ^ – FCS playoff participant; Rankings from The Sports Network poll

The 2014 Idaho State Bengals football team represented Idaho State University as a member of the Big Sky Conference during the 2014 NCAA Division I FCS football season. Led by fourth-year head coach Mike Kramer, the Bengals compiled an overall record of 8–4 with a mark of 6–2 in conference play, placing in a three-way tie for second in the Big Sky. Idaho State played their home games at Holt Arena in Pocatello, Idaho.

== Schedule ==
Date	Time	Opponent	Site	TV	Result	Attendance
August 28	5:30 pm	at Utah*	Rice Eccles Stadium; Salt Lake City, UT	P12N	L 14–56	45,925
September 6	6:00 pm	at Utah State*	Romney Stadium; Logan, UT	MW Net	L 20–40	20,445
September 13	2:35 pm	Chadron State*	Holt Arena; Pocatello, ID	BSTV	W 39–34	4,838
September 27	2:05 pm	Sacramento State^{†}	Holt Arena; Pocatello, ID	BSTV	W 44–24	7,652
October 4	2:30 pm	at No. 2 Eastern Washington	Roos Field; Cheney, WA	SWX	L 53–56	11,256
October 11	2:35 pm	Simon Fraser*	Holt Arena; Pocatello, ID	BSTV	W 66–14	4,422
October 18	2:35 pm	Southern Utah	Holt Arena; Pocatello, ID	BSTV	W 56–28	6,155
October 25	1:30 pm	at Northern Colorado	Nottingham Field; Greeley, CO	BSTV	W 46–12	4,210
November 1	5:05 pm	at Portland State	Providence Park; Portland, OR	BSTV	W 31–13	3,193
November 8	2:35 pm	No. 21 Cal Poly	Holt Arena; Pocatello, ID	BSTV	W 30–28	9,323
November 15	1:30 pm	at No. 12 Montana State	Bobcat Stadium; Bozeman, MT	RTNW	L 39–44	16,577
November 22	2:35 pm	Weber State	Holt Arena; Pocatello, ID	BSTV	W 46–28	7,933
*Non-conference game; ^{†}Homecoming; Rankings from The Sports Network Poll released prior to the game; All times are in Mountain time

== Game summaries ==
=== @ Utah ===
	1	2	3	4	Total
Bengals	7	0	7	0	14
Utes	14	21	14	7	56

Game officials: Referee - Jack Folliard, Umpire - Douglas Wilson, Head Linesman - Bob Day, Line Judge - Jeff Robinson, Side Judge - Aaron Santi, Field Judge - Brad Glenn, Back Judge - Steve Hudson, Head Replay Official - Jim Northcott

=== @ Utah State ===
	1	2	3	4	Total
Bengals	0	6	7	7	20
Aggies	6	14	13	7	40

=== Chadron State ===
	1	2	3	4	Total
Eagles	6	0	7	21	34
Bengals	7	20	12	0	39

=== Sacramento State ===
	1	2	3	4	Total
Hornets	7	10	0	7	24
Bengals	3	21	6	14	44

=== @ Eastern Washington ===
	1	2	3	4	Total
Bengals	14	17	7	15	53
#2 Eagles	21	14	14	7	56

=== Simon Fraser ===
	1	2	3	4	Total
Clan	0	0	0	14	14
Bengals	21	21	10	14	66

=== Southern Utah ===
	1	2	3	4	Total
Thunderbirds	7	14	7	0	28
Bengals	7	28	0	21	56

=== @ Northern Colorado ===
	1	2	3	4	Total
Bengals	10	14	15	7	46
Bears	0	0	12	0	12

=== @ Portland State ===
	1	2	3	4	Total
Bengals	14	3	7	7	31
Vikings	0	10	0	3	13

=== Cal Poly ===
	1	2	3	4	Total
#21 Mustangs	0	7	14	7	28
Bengals	14	3	6	7	30

=== @ Montana State ===
	1	2	3	4	Total
Bengals	14	16	0	9	39
#12 Bobcats	7	16	14	7	44

=== Weber State ===
	1	2	3	4	Total
Wildcats	11	3	14	0	28
Bengals	19	10	7	10	46
