= 2014 UC Davis Aggies football team =

American college football season

2014 UC Davis Aggies football
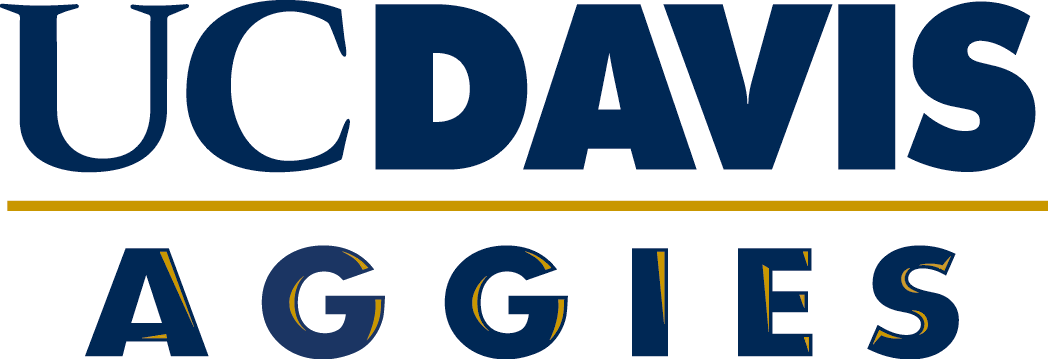
- Conference: Big Sky Conference
- Record: 2–9 (1–7 Big Sky)
- Head coach: Ron Gould (2nd season)
- Offensive coordinator: Kevin Daft (3rd season)
- Defensive coordinator: Bert Watts (2nd season)
- Home stadium: Aggie Stadium

2014 Big Sky Conference football standings
| | Conf. | | | Overall |
| Team | W | | L | W | | L |
|---|---|---|---|---|---|---|
| No. 4 Eastern Washington $^ | 7 | – | 1 | 11 | – | 3 |
| No. 13 Montana ^ | 6 | – | 2 | 9 | – | 5 |
| No. 20 Montana State ^ | 6 | – | 2 | 8 | – | 5 |
| No. 25 Idaho State | 6 | – | 2 | 8 | – | 4 |
| Cal Poly | 5 | – | 3 | 7 | – | 5 |
| Northern Arizona | 5 | – | 3 | 7 | – | 5 |
| Sacramento State | 4 | – | 4 | 7 | – | 5 |
| North Dakota | 3 | – | 5 | 5 | – | 7 |
| Southern Utah | 3 | – | 5 | 3 | – | 9 |
| Northern Colorado | 2 | – | 6 | 3 | – | 8 |
| Portland State | 2 | – | 6 | 3 | – | 9 |
| Weber State | 2 | – | 6 | 2 | – | 10 |
| UC Davis | 1 | – | 7 | 2 | – | 9 |
$ – Conference champion; ^ – FCS playoff participant; Rankings from The Sports Network poll

The 2014 UC Davis football team represented the University of California, Davis as a member of the Big Sky Conference during the 2014 NCAA Division I FCS football season. Led by second-year head coach Ron Gould, UC Davis compiled an overall record of 2–9 with a mark of 1–7 in conference play, placing last out of 13 teams in the Big Sky. The Aggies played home games at Aggie Stadium in Davis, California.

== Schedule ==
| Date | Time | Opponent | Site | TV | Result | Attendance |
|---|---|---|---|---|---|---|
| August 30 | 1:00 pm | at No. 11 (FBS) Stanford* | Stanford Stadium; Stanford, CA | P12N | L 0–45 | 49,509 |
| September 6 | 6:00 pm | Fort Lewis* | Aggie Stadium; Davis, CA | | W 52–17 | 3,597 |
| September 13 | 12:00 pm | at Colorado State* | Hughes Stadium; Fort Collins, CO | mtn | L 21–49 | 21,202 |
| September 27 | 6:00 pm | No. 2 Eastern Washington | Aggie Stadium; Davis, CA | BSTV | L 14–37 | 6,954 |
| October 4 | 4:30 pm | at Portland State | Providence Park; Portland, OR | RTNW | L 14–23 | 5,442 |
| October 11 | 4:00 pm | No. 11 Montana State^{†} | Aggie Stadium; Davis, CA | RTNW | L 37–77 | 7,152 |
| October 18 | 11:00 am | at No. 7 Montana | Washington–Grizzly Stadium; Missoula, MT | BSTV | L 28–42 | 25,766 |
| November 1 | 4:00 pm | Northern Colorado | Aggie Stadium; Davis, CA | BSTV | L 21–27 | 5,856 |
| November 8 | 1:00 pm | at No. 25 Northern Arizona | Walkup Skydome; Flagstaff, AZ | BSTV | L 21–23 | 4,722 |
| November 15 | 6:05 pm | at Cal Poly | Alex G. Spanos Stadium; San Luis Obispo, CA (Battle for the Golden Horseshoe) | BSTV | W 48–35 | 10,121 |
| November 22 | 1:00 pm | Sacramento State | Aggie Stadium; Davis, CA (Causeway Classic) | BSTV | L 30–41 | 7,047 |
*Non-conference game; ^{†}Homecoming; Rankings from The Sports Network Poll released prior to the game; All times are in Pacific time

== Media ==
All UC Davis games were carried live on KHTK 1140 AM. All home games and conference road games not being shown as part of the Root Sports game of the week package were carried through the conferences online streaming service Big Sky TV.
