= Eccles Coliseum =

Stadium in Utah, United States

Coordinates: 37°40′33″N 113°04′37″W

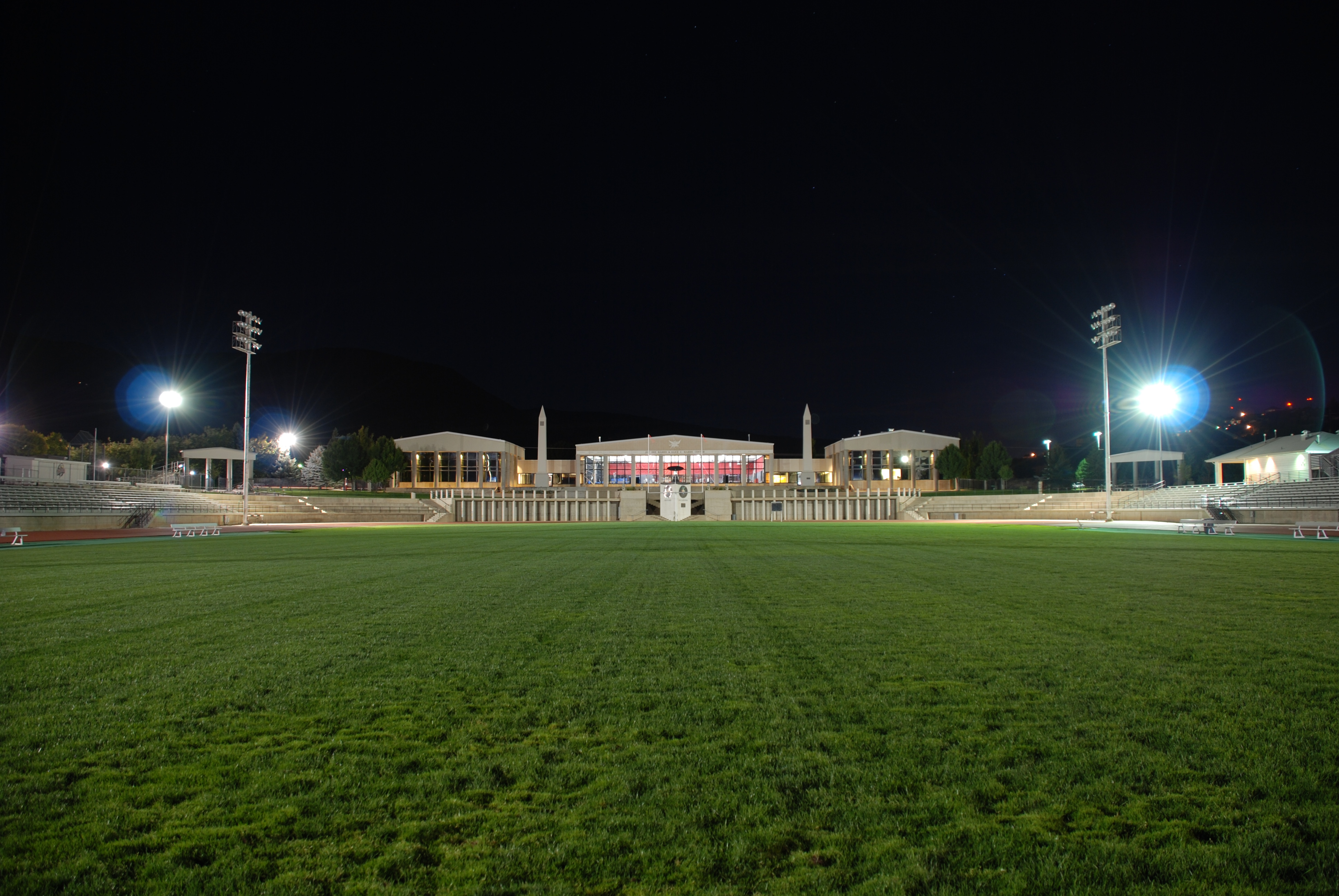
- Natural grass in 2009

- Location within the United States Location within Utah
- Interactive map of Eccles Coliseum
- Address: 351 University Boulevard
- Location: Southern Utah University; Cedar City, Utah, U.S.
- Elevation: 5,800 feet (1,770 m) AMSL
- Owner: Southern Utah University
- Operator: Southern Utah University
- Capacity: 8,500
- Surface: Hellas MatrixTurf (2012–present); Natural grass (1967–2011)

Construction
- Opened: 1967; 59 years ago
- Renovated: 1997

Tenants
- Southern Utah Thunderbirds (NCAA) (1967–present)

Eccles Coliseum is an 8,500-seat multi-purpose stadium in the western United States, on the campus of Southern Utah University in Cedar City, Utah. It is the home venue of the Southern Utah Thunderbirds football team and track and field teams of the Big Sky Conference.

The stadium also hosts the Utah Summer Games opening ceremonies and several events. Opened 59 years ago in 1967, its Hellas MatrixTurf playing field has a traditional north-south alignment at an elevation 5,800 feet (1,770 m) above sea level. The surface was natural grass until 2012.

== See also ==
- Spencer Eccles
- List of NCAA Division I FCS football stadiums

== Gallery ==
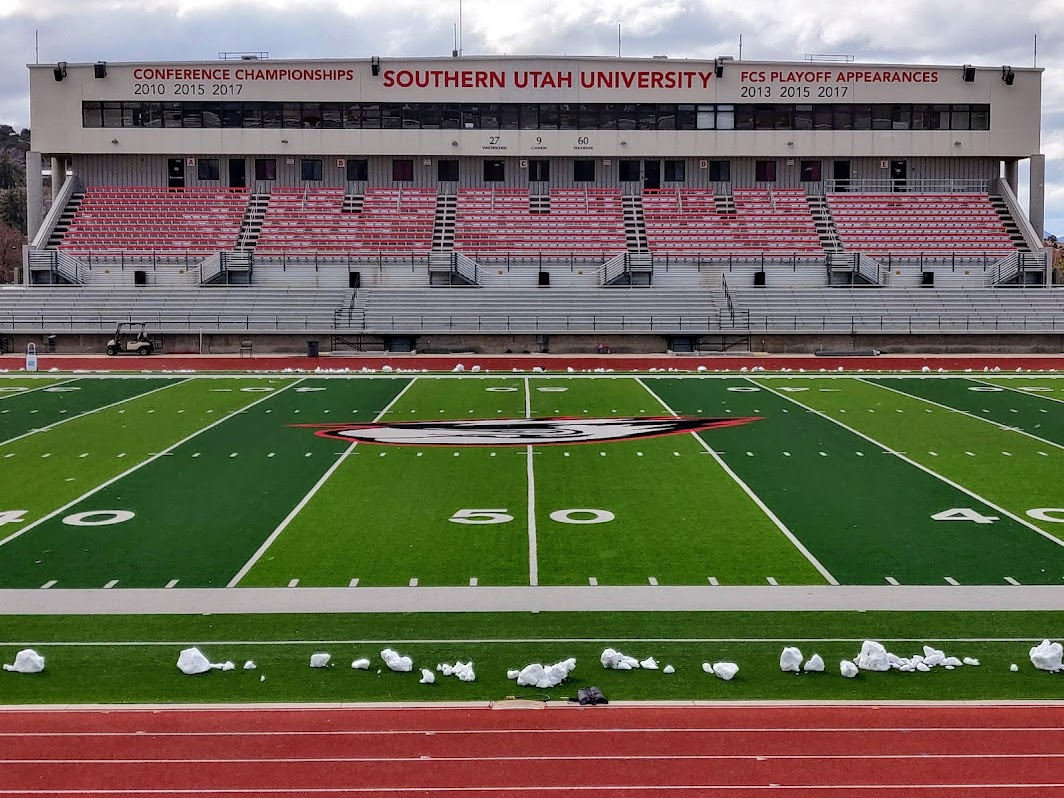
SUU Eccles Coliseum from East

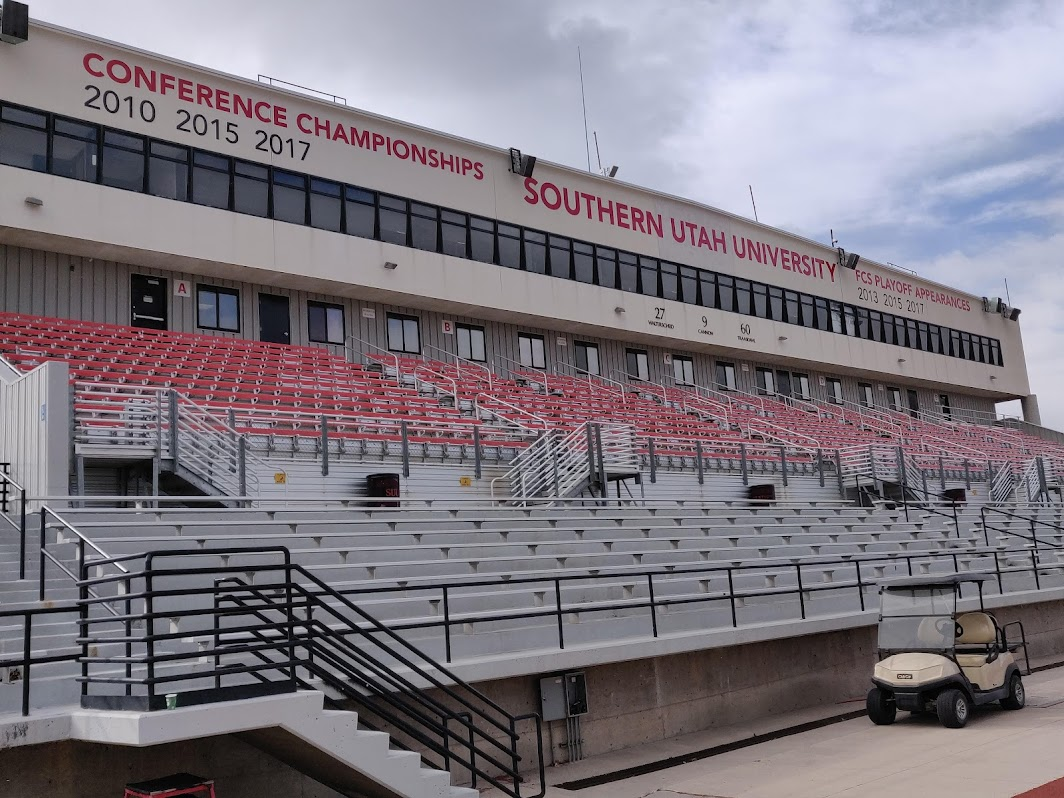
SUU Eccles Coliseum close up

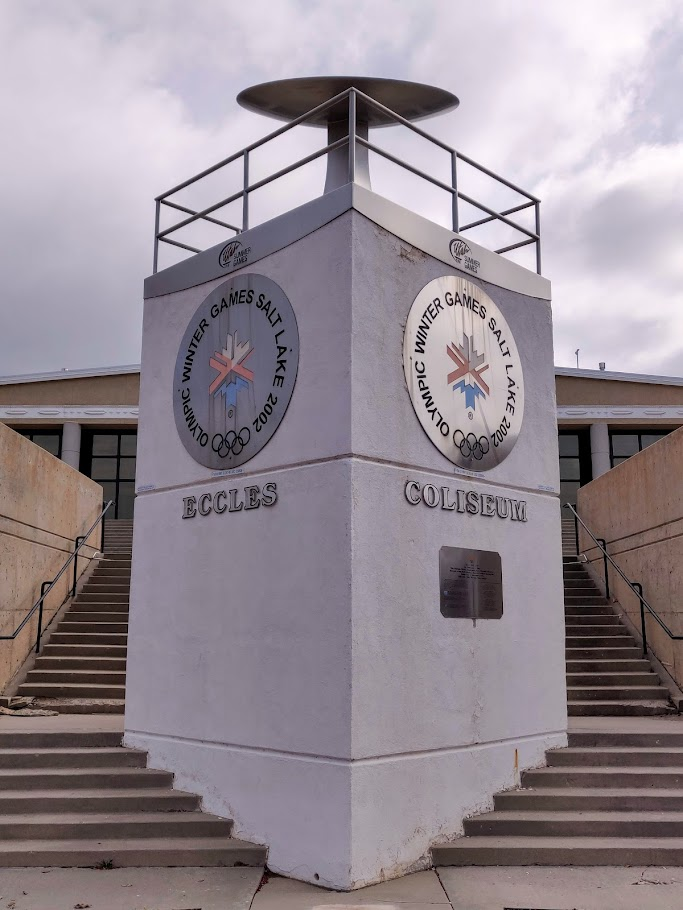
SUU Eccles Coliseum - Utah Summer Games Torch

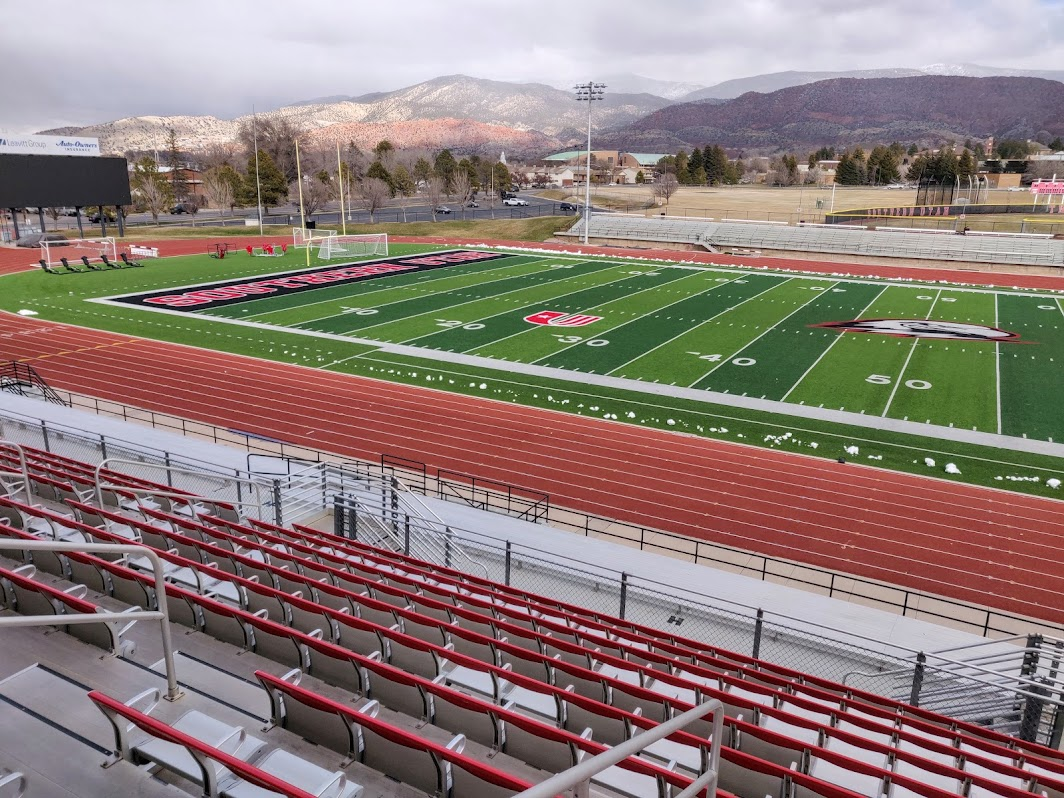
SUU Eccles Coliseum left

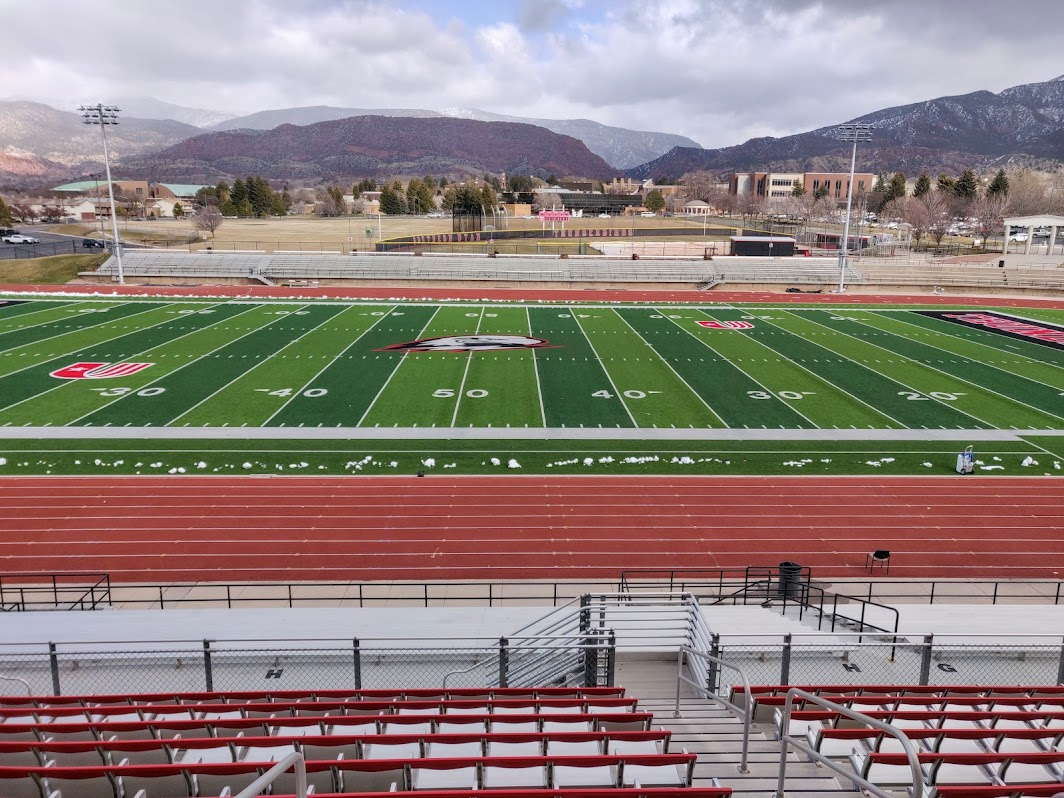
SUU Eccles Coliseum middle

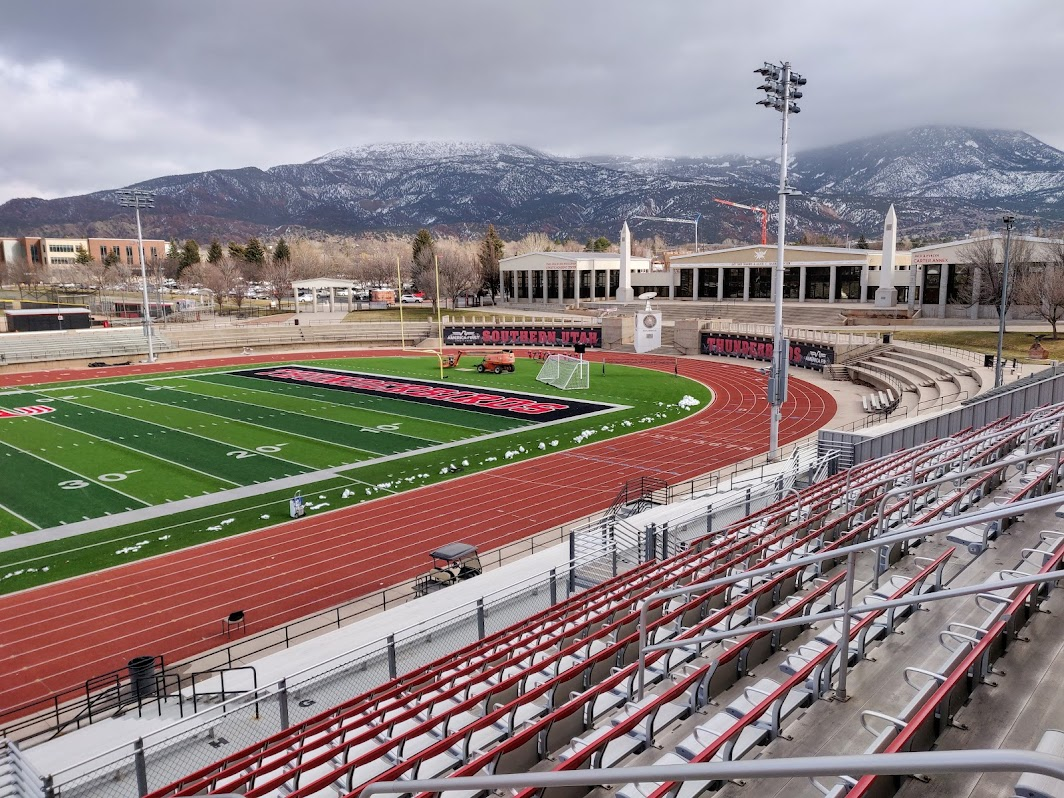
SUU Eccles Coliseum right

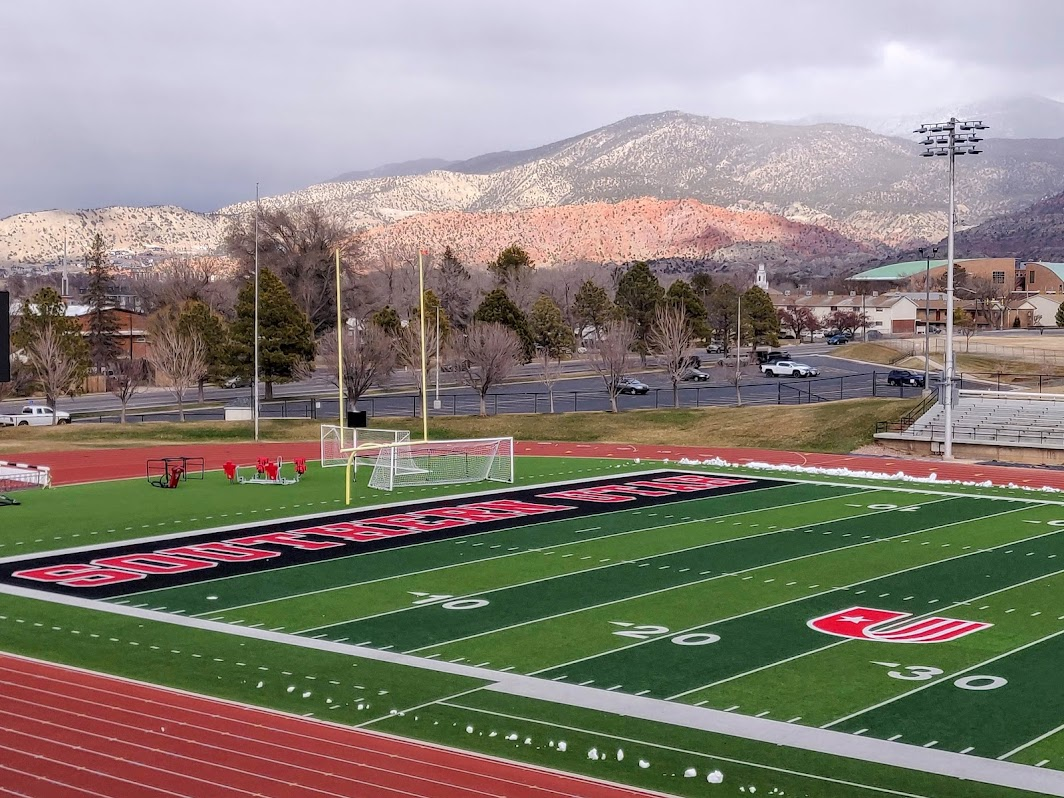
SUU Eccles Coliseum left closer

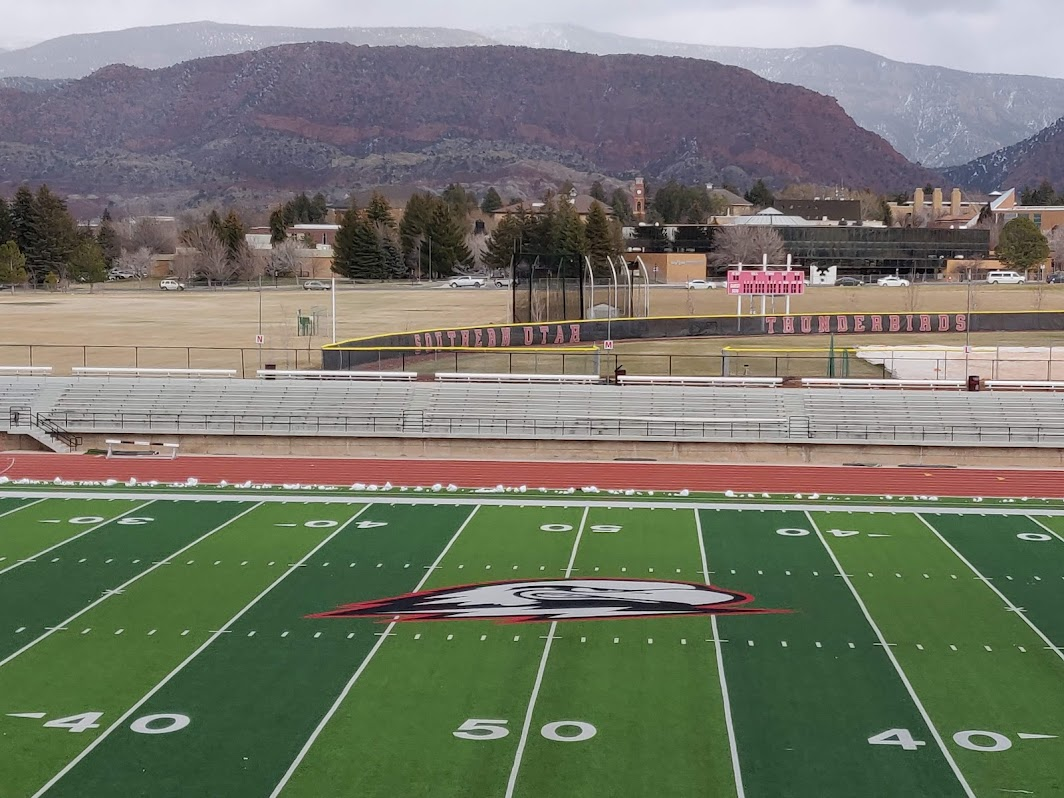
SUU Eccles Coliseum middle closer

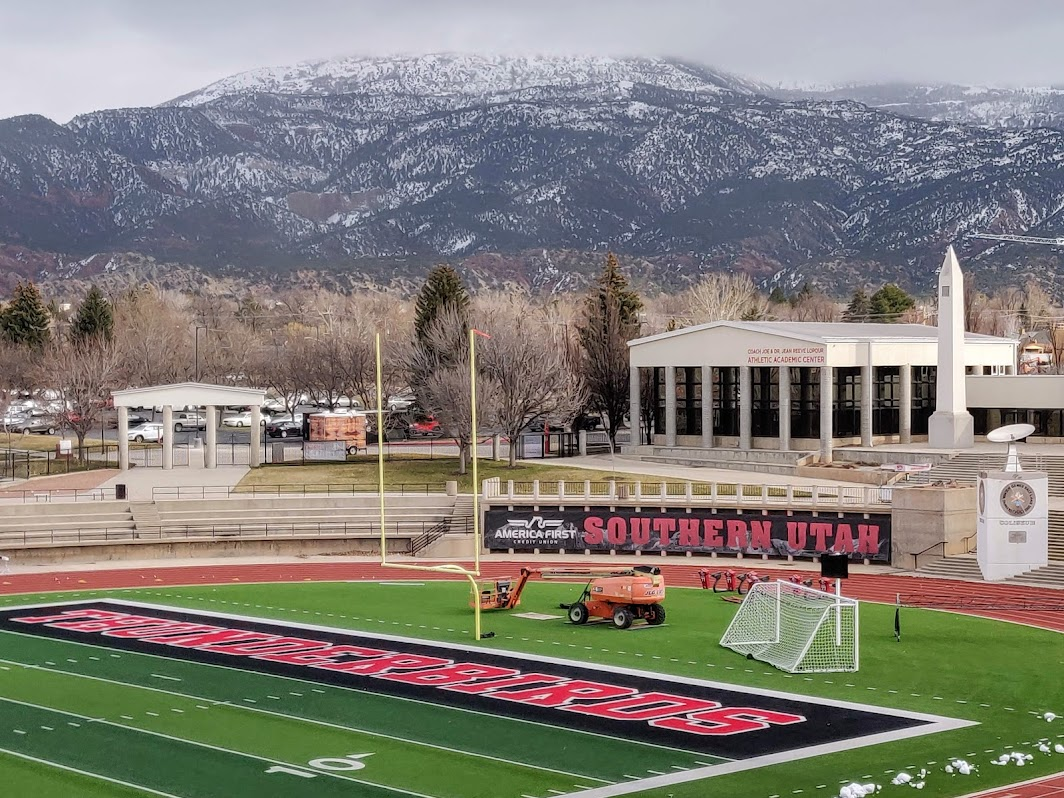
SUU Eccles Coliseum right closer

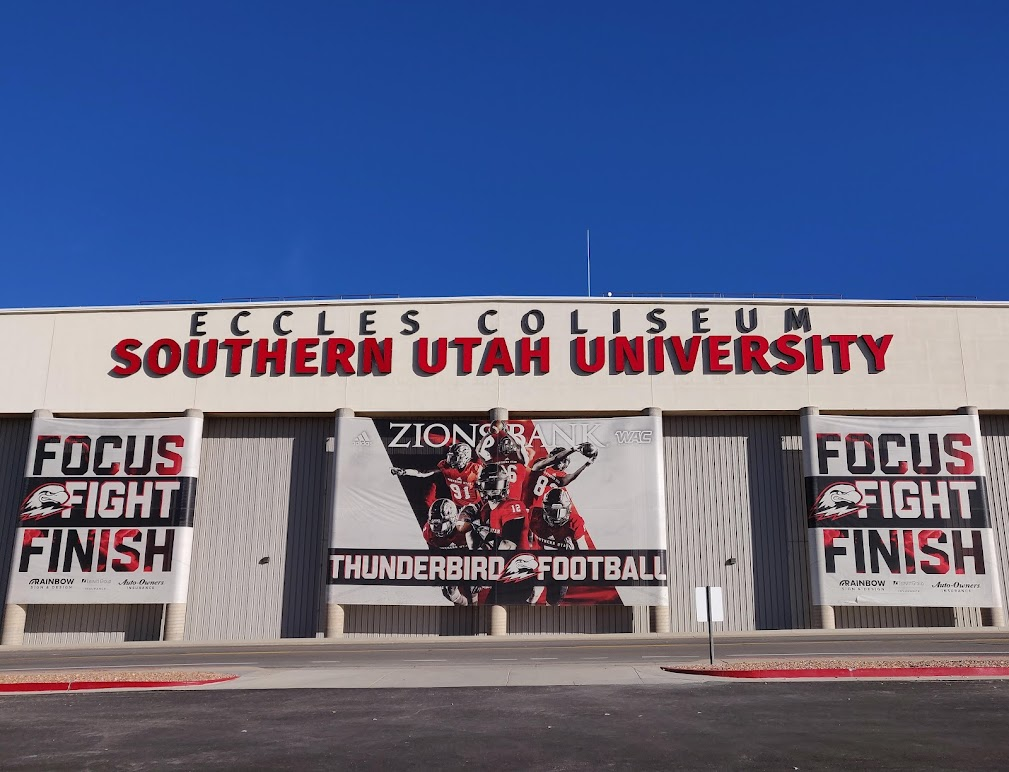
SUU Eccles Coliseum back of west side
