= 2014 Dayton Flyers football team =

American college football season

2014 Dayton Flyers football
- Conference: Pioneer Football League
- Record: 8–3 (6–2 PFL)
- Head coach: Rick Chamberlin (7th season)
- Offensive coordinator: Eric Evans (1st season)
- Defensive coordinator: Landon Fox (5th season)
- Home stadium: Welcome Stadium

2014 Pioneer Football League standings
	Conf.			Overall
Team	W		L	W		L
San Diego $^	7	–	1	9	–	3
Jacksonville *	7	–	1	9	–	2
Dayton	6	–	2	8	–	3
Drake	6	–	2	7	–	4
Campbell	4	–	4	5	–	7
Marist	4	–	4	4	–	7
Stetson	3	–	5	5	–	7
Morehead State	3	–	5	4	–	8
Butler	2	–	6	4	–	7
Valparaiso	2	–	6	4	–	8
Davidson	0	–	8	1	–	11
$ – Conference champion; ^ – FCS playoff participant; *Jacksonville ineligible for PFL title and FCS playoffs due to matters regarding the PFL's financial aid rules

The 2014 Dayton Flyers football team represented the University of Dayton as a member of the Pioneer Football League (PFL) during the 2014 NCAA Division I FCS football season. Led by seventh-year head coach Rick Chamberlin, the Flyers compiled an overall record of 8–3 with a mark of 6–2 in conference play, tying for third place in the PFL. Dayton played home games at Welcome Stadium in Dayton, Ohio.

== Schedule ==
Date	Time	Opponent	Site	Result	Attendance
September 6	1:00 pm	Georgetown*	Welcome Stadium; Dayton, OH	W 23–14	3,468
September 13	12:00 pm	at Duquesne*	Arthur J. Rooney Athletic Field; Pittsburgh, PA	L 13–33	2,163
September 20	1:00 pm	Robert Morris*	Welcome Stadium; Dayton, OH	W 31–7	5,839
October 4	1:00 pm	at Davidson	Richardson Stadium; Davidson, NC	W 54–48 ^{5OT}	2,279
October 11	12:00 pm	at Marist	Tenney Stadium at Leonidoff Field; Poughkeepsie, NY	W 31–21	1,778
October 18	1:00 pm	Morehead State	Welcome Stadium; Dayton, OH	W 41–7	3,014
October 25	9:00 pm	at San Diego	Torero Stadium; San Diego, CA	L 29–40	1,714
November 1	1:00 pm	Valparaiso	Welcome Stadium; Dayton, OH	W 42–19	1,866
November 8	1:00 pm	Drake	Welcome Stadium; Dayton, OH (rivalry)	L 30–34	2,485
November 15	12:00 pm	at Butler	Butler Bowl; Indianapolis, IN	W 21–14	2,034
November 22	1:00 pm	Campbell	Welcome Stadium; Dayton, OH	W 19–14	1,935
*Non-conference game; All times are in Eastern time
