= 2014 San Diego Toreros football team =

American college football season

2014 San Diego Toreros football

PFL champion

NCAA Division I First Round, L 14–52 vs. Montana
- Conference: Pioneer Football League
- Record: 9–3 (7–1 PFL)
- Head coach: Dale Lindsey (2nd season)
- Offensive coordinator: Tanner Engstrand (4th season)
- Defensive coordinator: Steve Irvin (2nd season)
- Home stadium: Torero Stadium

2014 Pioneer Football League standings
	Conf.			Overall
Team	W		L	W		L
San Diego $^	7	–	1	9	–	3
Jacksonville *	7	–	1	9	–	2
Dayton	6	–	2	8	–	3
Drake	6	–	2	7	–	4
Campbell	4	–	4	5	–	7
Marist	4	–	4	4	–	7
Stetson	3	–	5	5	–	7
Morehead State	3	–	5	4	–	8
Butler	2	–	6	4	–	7
Valparaiso	2	–	6	4	–	8
Davidson	0	–	8	1	–	11
$ – Conference champion; ^ – FCS playoff participant; *Jacksonville ineligible for PFL title and FCS playoffs due to matters regarding the PFL's financial aid rules

The 2014 San Diego Toreros football team represented the University of San Diego as a member of the Pioneer Football League (PFL) during the 2014 NCAA Division I FCS football season. Led by second-year head coach Dale Lindsey, the Toreros compiled an overall record of 9–3 with a mark of 7–1 in conference play, tying with Jacksonville for the best record in the league. However, Jacksonville forfeited a share of the PFL title after disclosing financial irregularities. San Diego earned the conference's automatic bid to the NCAA Division I Football Championship playoffs, where the Toreros lost to in the first round to Montana. The team played home games at Torero Stadium in San Diego.

== Schedule ==
Date	Time	Opponent	Site	TV	Result	Attendance
September 6	6:00 pm	Western New Mexico*	Torero Stadium; San Diego, CA		W 23–17	4,064
September 13	10:00 am	at Jacksonville	D. B. Milne Field; Jacksonville, FL		L 18–35	1,950
September 20	1:00 pm	Princeton*	Torero Stadium; San Diego, CA		W 39–29	3,324
September 27	10:00 am	at Marist	Tenney Stadium at Leonidoff Field; Poughkeepsie, NY		W 20–16	3,215
October 11	2:00 pm	Stetson^{†}	Torero Stadium; San Diego, CA		W 31–23	3,405
October 18	9:00 am	at Butler	Butler Bowl; Indianapolis, IN		W 27–21	1,808
October 25	6:00 pm	Dayton	Torero Stadium; San Diego, CA		W 40–29	1,714
November 1	10:30 am	at Drake	Drake Stadium; Des Moines, IA		W 17–14	1,909
November 8	1:00 pm	Morehead State	Torero Stadium; San Diego, CA		W 49–28	1,184
November 15	1:00 pm	Valparaiso	Torero Stadium; San Diego, CA		W 32–27	1,480
November 22	4:00 pm	Cal Poly*	Torero Stadium; San Diego, CA		L 3–34	4,333
November 29	1:00 pm	at No. 12 Montana*	Washington–Grizzly Stadium; Missoula, MT (NCAA Division I First Round)	ESPN3	L 14–52	14,018
*Non-conference game; ^{†}Homecoming; Rankings from The Sports Network Poll released prior to the game; All times are in Pacific time
