= 2014 Campbell Fighting Camels football team =

American college football season

2014 Campbell Fighting Camels football
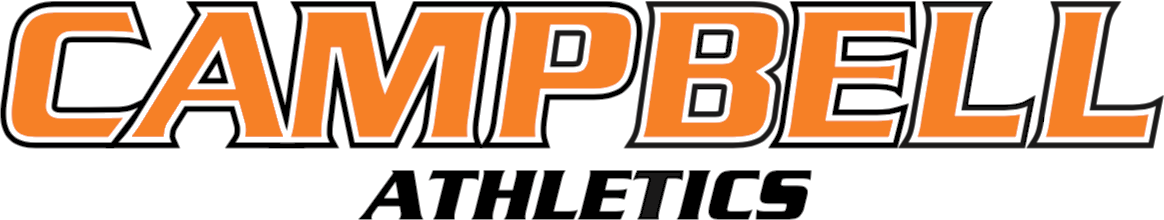
- Conference: Pioneer Football League
- Record: 5–7 (4–4 PFL)
- Head coach: Mike Minter (2nd season)
- Offensive coordinator: Landon Mariani (2nd season)
- Defensive coordinator: Craig Cox (2nd season)
- Home stadium: Barker–Lane Stadium

2014 Pioneer Football League standings
	Conf.			Overall
Team	W		L	W		L
San Diego $^	7	–	1	9	–	3
Jacksonville *	7	–	1	9	–	2
Dayton	6	–	2	8	–	3
Drake	6	–	2	7	–	4
Campbell	4	–	4	5	–	7
Marist	4	–	4	4	–	7
Stetson	3	–	5	5	–	7
Morehead State	3	–	5	4	–	8
Butler	2	–	6	4	–	7
Valparaiso	2	–	6	4	–	8
Davidson	0	–	8	1	–	11
$ – Conference champion; ^ – FCS playoff participant; *Jacksonville ineligible for PFL title and FCS playoffs due to matters regarding the PFL's financial aid rules

The 2014 Campbell Fighting Camels football team represented Campbell University in the 2014 NCAA Division I FCS football season. They were led by second-year head coach Mike Minter and played their home games at Barker–Lane Stadium. They were a member of the Pioneer Football League. They finished the season 5–7, 4–4 in PFL play to finish in a tie for fifth place.

== Schedule ==
Date	Time	Opponent	Site	TV	Result	Attendance
August 28	7:00 pm	Charlotte*	Barker–Lane Stadium; Buies Creek, NC	BSN	L 9–33	6,472
September 6	6:00 pm	at Appalachian State*	Kidd Brewer Stadium; Boone, NC	ESPN3	L 0–66	25,861
September 11	7:00 pm	at Charleston Southern*	Buccaneer Field; Charleston, SC	BSN	L 10–34	2,636
September 27	6:00 pm	Valparaiso	Barker–Lane Stadium; Buies Creek, NC	BSN	W 34–24	6,370
October 4	1:00 pm	at Morehead State	Jayne Stadium; Morehead, KY		W 31–24	7,827
October 11	12:00 pm	Butler	Barker–Lane Stadium; Buies Creek, NC	BSN	W 28–9	3,872
October 18	4:00 pm	Davidson	Barker–Lane Stadium; Buies Creek, NC	BSN	W 28–27	6,345
October 25	12:00 pm	at Marist	Tenney Stadium at Leonidoff Field; Poughkeepsie, NY		L 20–27	1,278
November 1	1:00 pm	Stetson	Barker–Lane Stadium; Buies Creek, NC	BSN	L 24–28	2,878
November 8	1:00 pm	Missouri Baptist*	Barker–Lane Stadium; Buies Creek, NC	BSN	W 66–7	3,630
November 15	1:00 pm	at Jacksonville	D. B. Milne Field; Jacksonville, FL		L 19–45	2,437
November 22	1:00 pm	at Dayton	Welcome Stadium; Dayton, OH		L 14–19	1,935
*Non-conference game; All times are in Eastern time
