= 2000 Canisius Golden Griffins football team =

American college football season

2000 Canisius Golden Griffins football
- Conference: Metro Atlantic Athletic Conference
- Record: 0–10 (0–7 MAAC)
- Head coach: Ed Argast (1st season)
- Home stadium: Demske Field

2000 Metro Atlantic Athletic Conference football standings
| | Conf. | | | Overall |
| Team | W | | L | W | | L |
|---|---|---|---|---|---|---|
| Duquesne $ | 8 | – | 0 | 10 | – | 1 |
| Fairfield | 7 | – | 1 | 8 | – | 2 |
| Marist | 5 | – | 3 | 6 | – | 4 |
| Georgetown | 3 | – | 2 | 5 | – | 6 |
| La Salle | 4 | – | 3 | 7 | – | 4 |
| Iona | 3 | – | 5 | 4 | – | 7 |
| Saint Peter's | 2 | – | 6 | 4 | – | 7 |
| Siena | 1 | – | 6 | 1 | – | 9 |
| Canisius | 0 | – | 7 | 0 | – | 10 |
$ – Conference champion

The 2000 Canisius Golden Griffins football team represented Canisius College as a member of the Metro Atlantic Athletic Conference (MAAC) during the 2000 NCAA Division I-AA football season. Led by first-year head coach Ed Argast, the Golden Griffins compiled an overall record of 0–10 with a mark of 0–7 in conference play, placing last out of nine teams in the MAAC. The Canisius offense scored 100 points while the defense allowed 373 points.

== Schedule ==
| Date | Time | Opponent | Site | Result | Attendance | Source |
|---|---|---|---|---|---|---|
| September 9 | 1:00 pm | at Iona | Mazzella Field; New Rochelle, NY | L 2–55 | 1,200 | |
| September 16 | 1:30 pm | Saint Peter's | Demske Field; Buffalo, NY | L 0–13 | 848 | |
| September 23 | 1:00 pm | at Gannon* | Erie Veterans Memorial Stadium; Erie, PA | L 12–17 | 500 | |
| October 7 | 1:30 pm | La Salle | Demske Field; Buffalo, NY | L 10–23 | | |
| October 14 | 2:00 pm | at Rochester* | Fauver Stadium; Rochester, NY | L 28–34 ^{3OT} | 4,631 | |
| October 21 | 3:00 pm | Siena | Demske Field; Buffalo, NY | L 14–19 | 1,000 | |
| October 28 | 1:00 pm | at Marist | Leonidoff Field; Poughkeepsie, NY | L 14–49 | 1,237 | |
| November 4 | 1:30 pm | at Alfred* | Merrill Field; Alfred, NY | L 7–41 | 1,235 | |
| November 11 | 1:00 pm | at Fairfield | Alumni Stadium; Fairfield, CT | L 0–66 | 2,087 | |
| November 18 | 1:30 pm | Duquesne | Demske Field; Buffalo, NY | L 13–56 | 753 | |
*Non-conference game; All times are in Eastern time
