= 2014 Marist Red Foxes football team =

American college football season

2014 Marist Red Foxes football
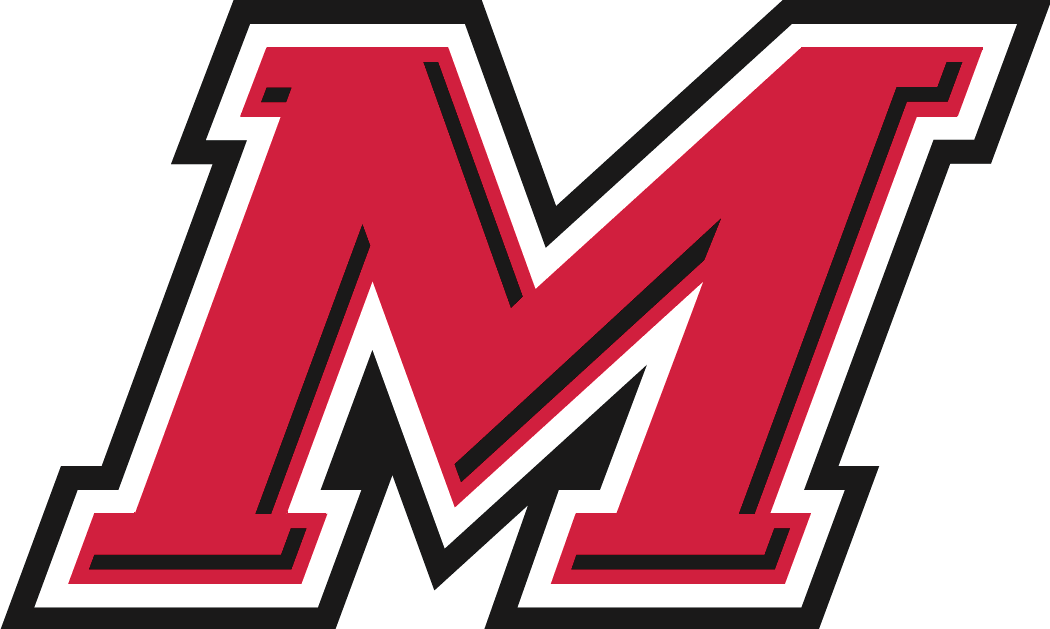
- Conference: Pioneer Football League
- Record: 4–7 (4–4 PFL)
- Head coach: Jim Parady (23rd season)
- Offensive coordinator: Nate Fields (2nd season)
- Defensive coordinator: Scott Rumsey (14th season)
- Home stadium: Tenney Stadium at Leonidoff Field

2014 Pioneer Football League standings
	Conf.			Overall
Team	W		L	W		L
San Diego $^	7	–	1	9	–	3
Jacksonville *	7	–	1	9	–	2
Dayton	6	–	2	8	–	3
Drake	6	–	2	7	–	4
Campbell	4	–	4	5	–	7
Marist	4	–	4	4	–	7
Stetson	3	–	5	5	–	7
Morehead State	3	–	5	4	–	8
Butler	2	–	6	4	–	7
Valparaiso	2	–	6	4	–	8
Davidson	0	–	8	1	–	11
$ – Conference champion; ^ – FCS playoff participant; *Jacksonville ineligible for PFL title and FCS playoffs due to matters regarding the PFL's financial aid rules

The 2014 Marist Red Foxes football team represented Marist College as a member of the Pioneer Football League (PFL) during the 2014 NCAA Division I FCS football season. Led by 23rd-year head coach Jim Parady, the Red Foxes compiled an overall record of 4–7 with a mark of 4–4 in conference play, tying for fifth place in the PFL. Marist played home games at Tenney Stadium at Leonidoff Field in Poughkeepsie, New York.

== Schedule ==
Date	Time	Opponent	Site	TV	Result	Attendance	Source
August 30	6:00 pm	at Sacred Heart*	Campus Field; Fairfield, CT		L 7–28	3,500	
September 6	6:00 pm	Bucknell*	Tenney Stadium at Leonidoff Field; Poughkeepsie, NY	RFN	L 0–22	2,313	
September 13	6:00 pm	Georgetown*	Tenney Stadium at Leonidoff Field; Poughkeepsie, NY	RFN	L 7–27	1,824	
September 20	2:00 pm	at Drake	Drake Stadium; Des Moines, IA		L 6–21	3,354	
September 27	1:00 pm	San Diego	Tenney Stadium at Leonidoff Field; Poughkeepsie, NY	RFN	L 16–20	3,215	
October 4	1:00 pm	at Valparaiso	Brown Field; Valparaiso, IN		W 35–7	1,512	
October 11	12:00 pm	Dayton^{†}	Tenney Stadium at Leonidoff Field; Poughkeepsie, NY	RFN	L 21–31	1,778	
October 25	12:00 pm	Campbell	Tenney Stadium at Leonidoff Field; Poughkeepsie, NY	RFN	W 27–20	1,278	
November 1	12:00 pm	Jacksonville	Tenney Stadium at Leonidoff Field; Poughkeepsie, NY	RFN	W 17–16	914	
November 8	3:00 pm	at Stetson	Spec Martin Stadium; DeLand, FL		L 14–22	4,265	
November 15	1:00 pm	Davidson	Tenney Stadium at Leonidoff Field; Poughkeepsie, NY	RFN	W 38–7	1,517	
*Non-conference game; ^{†}Homecoming; All times are in Eastern time
