= 2014 Davidson Wildcats football team =

American college football season

2014 Davidson Wildcats football
- Conference: Pioneer Football League
- Record: 1–11 (0–8 PFL)
- Head coach: Paul Nichols (2nd season)
- Offensive coordinator: Bush Hamdan (1st season)
- Defensive coordinator: Chad Creamer
- Home stadium: Richardson Stadium

2014 Pioneer Football League standings
	Conf.			Overall
Team	W		L	W		L
San Diego $^	7	–	1	9	–	3
Jacksonville *	7	–	1	9	–	2
Dayton	6	–	2	8	–	3
Drake	6	–	2	7	–	4
Campbell	4	–	4	5	–	7
Marist	4	–	4	4	–	7
Stetson	3	–	5	5	–	7
Morehead State	3	–	5	4	–	8
Butler	2	–	6	4	–	7
Valparaiso	2	–	6	4	–	8
Davidson	0	–	8	1	–	11
$ – Conference champion; ^ – FCS playoff participant; *Jacksonville ineligible for PFL title and FCS playoffs due to matters regarding the PFL's financial aid rules

The 2014 Davidson Wildcats football team represented Davidson College in the 2014 NCAA Division I FCS football season. They were led by second-year head coach Paul Nichols and played their home games at Richardson Stadium. They were a member of the Pioneer Football League. They finished the season 1–11, 0–8 in PFL play to finish in last place.

== Schedule ==
Date	Time	Opponent	Site	TV	Result	Attendance
August 30	7:00 pm	College of Faith Charlotte*	Richardson Stadium; Davidson, NC	DAA	W 56–0	3,873
September 6	7:00 pm	Catawba*	Richardson Stadium; Davidson, NC	DAA	L 7–35	4,823
September 13	1:30 pm	at VMI*	Alumni Memorial Field; Lexington, VA		L 24–52	4,479
September 20	1:00 pm	Morehead State^{†}	Richardson Stadium; Davidson, NC		L 32–40	2,972
September 27	6:00 pm	at Princeton*	Powers Field at Princeton Stadium; Princeton, NJ		L 17–56	15,205
October 4	1:00 pm	Dayton	Richardson Stadium; Davidson, NC	DAA	L 48–54 ^{5OT}	2,279
October 11	2:00 pm	at Drake	Drake Stadium; Des Moines, IA		L 14–51	2,397
October 18	4:00 pm	at Campbell	Barker–Lane Stadium; Buies Creek, NC		L 27–28	6,345
October 25	1:00 pm	Stetson	Richardson Stadium; Davidson, NC	DAA	L 34–40	3,614
November 8	1:00 pm	Jacksonville	Richardson Stadium; Davidson, NC	DAA	L 0–56	2,214
November 15	1:00 pm	at Marist	Tenney Stadium at Leonidoff Field; Poughkeepsie, NY		L 7–38	1,517
November 22	2:00 pm	at Valparaiso	Brown Field; Valparaiso, IN		L 13–27	922
*Non-conference game; ^{†}Homecoming; All times are in Eastern time

- Source: Schedule
