= 2014 Jacksonville Dolphins football team =

American college football season

2014 Jacksonville Dolphins football
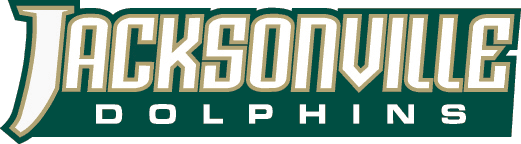
- Conference: Pioneer Football League
- Record: 9–2 (7–1 PFL)
- Head coach: Kerwin Bell (8th season)
- Defensive coordinator: Jerry Odom (5th season)
- Home stadium: D. B. Milne Field

2014 Pioneer Football League standings
	Conf.			Overall
Team	W		L	W		L
San Diego $^	7	–	1	9	–	3
Jacksonville *	7	–	1	9	–	2
Dayton	6	–	2	8	–	3
Drake	6	–	2	7	–	4
Campbell	4	–	4	5	–	7
Marist	4	–	4	4	–	7
Stetson	3	–	5	5	–	7
Morehead State	3	–	5	4	–	8
Butler	2	–	6	4	–	7
Valparaiso	2	–	6	4	–	8
Davidson	0	–	8	1	–	11
$ – Conference champion; ^ – FCS playoff participant; *Jacksonville ineligible for PFL title and FCS playoffs due to matters regarding the PFL's financial aid rules

The 2014 Jacksonville Dolphins football team represented Jacksonville University in the 2014 NCAA Division I FCS football season. They were led by eighth-year head coach Kerwin Bell and played their home games at D. B. Milne Field. They were a member of the Pioneer Football League. They finished the season 9–2, 7–1 in PFL play. The 7–1 record would have been good enough to claim a share of the PFL title. However, Jacksonville withdrew from contention for the PFL title and the FCS Playoffs as a result of its internal review of compliance matters regarding the PFL’s financial aid rules.

== Schedule ==
Date	Time	Opponent	Site	TV	Result	Attendance
August 30	6:30 pm	at No. 3 Southeastern Louisiana*	Strawberry Stadium; Hammond, LA		L 3–44	3,822
September 13	1:00 pm	San Diego	D. B. Milne Field; Jacksonville, FL		W 35–18	1,950
September 20	1:00 pm	Penn*	D. B. Milne Field; Jacksonville, FL		W 34–31	2,268
September 27	12:00 pm	at Butler	Butler Bowl; Indianapolis, IN		W 35–7	3,188
October 4	1:00 pm	Drake^{†}	D. B. Milne Field; Jacksonville, FL	ASAA	W 29–14	3,748
October 11	1:00 pm	at Morehead State	Jayne Stadium; Morehead, KY		W 45–26	3,755
October 18	6:00 pm	at Stetson	Spec Martin Stadium; DeLand, FL		W 30–7	3,641
October 25	1:00 pm	at Limestone*	Gaffney HS; Gaffney, SC		W 61–10	2,753
November 1	12:00 pm	at Marist	Tenney Stadium at Leonidoff Field; Poughkeepsie, NY		L 16–17	914
November 8	1:00 pm	at Davidson	Richardson Stadium; Davidson, NC		W 56–0	2,214
November 15	1:00 pm	Campbell	D. B. Milne Field; Jacksonville, FL	ASAA	W 45–19	2,437
*Non-conference game; ^{†}Homecoming; Rankings from The Sports Network FCS Poll released prior to game Poll released prior to the game; All times are in Eastern time

- Source: Schedule
