= Roger Hughes =

American football player and coach (born 1960)

Biographical details
- Born: September 4, 1960 (age 66); Crawford, Nebraska, U.S.

Playing career
- 1979?–1981: Doane
- Position: Tight end

Coaching career (HC unless noted)
- 1983: Doane (GA)
- 1984–1985: Nebraska (GA)
- 1986–1987: Doane (OC)
- 1988: Wisconsin–Whitewater (RB)
- 1989–1991: Cameron (OC)
- 1992–1999: Dartmouth (OC)
- 2000–2009: Princeton
- 2010: Omaha Nighthawks (WR)
- 2013–2021: Stetson

Head coaching record
- Overall: 78–102

Accomplishments and honors

Championships
- 1 Ivy (2006)

Awards
- PFL Coach of the Year (2018)

Roger A. Hughes (born September 4, 1960) is an American college football coach and former player. He served as the head football coach at Princeton University from 2000 to 2009, and amassed a 47–52 record. He was the head football coach at Stetson University, which revived their program after a hiatus of more than 50 years beginning with the 2013 season. On May 7, 2021, Hughes resigned to become the president of Doane University.

== Biography ==
Hughes grew up in Crawford, Nebraska and was a three-sport athlete at Crawford High School. He received a basketball scholarship to attend Nebraska Western Junior College, where he spent one year, before transferring to Doane College. He played golf and football as a tight end there and graduated in 1982.

Hughes served as an assistant coach at Doane, Nebraska, Wisconsin–Whitewater, Cameron, and Dartmouth. In 2000, he was hired as the head coach at Princeton University. Hughes' best season came in 2006, when the Tigers finished with a 9–1 mark to share the Ivy League co-championship with Yale. In the preseason, Princeton had been picked to finish sixth (of eight) in the conference, and the team's performance earned Hughes consideration as a finalist for the Eddie Robinson Award, which is given to the best head coach at the Division I Football Championship Subdivision level.

Princeton finished the 2009 season with a 4–6 record for the third consecutive year. Hughes was fired the following day on November 23. At the time of his termination, Hughes had the sixth-worst record by winning percentage of the school's 21 coaches. In 2010, former Boston College coach Jeff Jagodzinski hired Hughes to be the wide receivers coach for the Omaha Nighthawks of the UFL.

== Head coaching record ==
Year	Team	Overall	Conference	Standing	Bowl/playoffs	TSN^{#}
Princeton Tigers (Ivy League) (2000–2009)
2000	Princeton	3–7	3–4	5th		
2001	Princeton	3–6	3–4	T–7th		
2002	Princeton	6–4	4–3	4th		
2003	Princeton	2–8	2–5	7th		
2004	Princeton	5–5	3–4	T–4th		
2005	Princeton	7–3	5–2	T–2nd		
2006	Princeton	9–1	6–1	T–1st		18
2007	Princeton	4–6	3–4	T–4th		
2008	Princeton	4–6	3–4	T–4th		
2009	Princeton	4–6	3–4	T–4th		
Princeton:		47–52	35–35			
Stetson Hatters (Pioneer Football League) (2013–2020)
2013	Stetson	2–9	1–7	T–9th		
2014	Stetson	5–7	3–5	T–7th		
2015	Stetson	3–8	1–7	T–8th		
2016	Stetson	4–7	2–6	T–9th		
2017	Stetson	2–9	1–7	10th		
2018	Stetson	8–2	6–2	T–2nd		
2019	Stetson	7–4	4–4	T–5th		
2020–21	Stetson	0–4	0–4	6th		
Stetson:		31–50	18–42			
Total:		78–102				
National championship Conference title Conference division title or championship game berth
