= 2014 Missouri State Bears football team =

American college football season

2014 Missouri State Bears football
- Conference: Missouri Valley Football Conference
- Record: 4–8 (1–7 MVFC)
- Head coach: Terry Allen (9th season)
- Offensive coordinator: Rob Christophel (9th season)
- Offensive scheme: Spread
- Defensive coordinator: D. J. Vokolek (9th season)
- Base defense: 3–4
- Captains: Andrew Beisel; Zack Cooley; Kierra Harris; Robert Booker; Caleb Schaffitzel
- Home stadium: Robert W. Plaster Stadium

2014 Missouri Valley Football Conference standings
	Conf.			Overall
Team	W		L	W		L
No. 1 North Dakota State +^	7	–	1	15	–	1
No. 2 Illinois State +^	7	–	1	13	–	2
No. 10 Northern Iowa ^	6	–	2	9	–	5
No. 12 South Dakota St. ^	5	–	3	9	–	5
No. 19 Indiana State ^	4	–	4	8	–	6
No. 22 Youngstown State	4	–	4	7	–	5
Southern Illinois	3	–	5	6	–	6
Western Illinois	3	–	5	5	–	7
Missouri State	1	–	7	4	–	8
South Dakota	0	–	8	2	–	10
+ – Conference co-champions; ^ – FCS playoff participant; Rankings from The Sports Network poll

The 2014 Missouri State Bears football team represented Missouri State University as a member of the Missouri Valley Football Conference (MVFC) during the 2014 NCAA Division I FCS football season. Led by Terry Allen in his ninth and final season as head coach, the Bears compiled an overall record of 4–8 with a mark of 1–7 in conference play, placing ninth in the MVFC. Missouri State played home games at Robert W. Plaster Stadium in Springfield, Missouri.

Allen retired from coaching following the season.

== Schedule ==
Date	Time	Opponent	Site	TV	Result	Attendance
August 28	6:00 pm	at Northwestern State*	Harry Turpin Stadium; Natchitoches, LA		W 34–27	9,284
September 6	2:30 pm	at Oklahoma State*	Boone Pickens Stadium; Stillwater, OK	FSN	L 23–40	51,562
September 13	6:00 pm	North Dakota*	Robert W. Plaster Stadium; Springfield, MO	MC-22	W 38–0	18,386
September 20	6:00 pm	at Central Arkansas*	Estes Stadium; Conway, AR		W 33–31	10,027
October 4	2:00 pm	No. 18 Youngstown State	Robert W. Plaster Stadium; Springfield, MO	MC-22	L 7–14	12,218
October 11	6:00 pm	at No. 19 South Dakota State	Coughlin–Alumni Stadium; Brookings, SD		L 28–32	11,348
October 18	2:00 pm	South Dakota^{†}	Robert W. Plaster Stadium; Springfield, MO	ESPN3	W 31–12	15,537
October 25	6:00 pm	at No. 9 Illinois State	Hancock Stadium; Normal, IL		L 7–21	10,164
November 1	12:00 pm	at No. 19 Indiana State	Memorial Stadium; Terre Haute, IN		L 18–20	4,799
November 8	2:00 pm	Southern Illinois	Robert W. Plaster Stadium; Springfield, MO	MSAA	L 22–32	7,586
November 15	2:00 pm	No. 4 North Dakota State	Robert W. Plaster Stadium; Springfield, MO	MC-22	L 10–45	4,597
November 22	4:00 pm	at No. 11 Northern Iowa	UNI-Dome; Cedar Falls, IA		L 24–38	10,298
*Non-conference game; ^{†}Homecoming; Rankings from The Sports Network Poll released prior to the game; All times are in Central time

== Rankings ==
Ranking movements Legend: ██ Increase in ranking ██ Decrease in ranking — = Not ranked RV = Received votes
	Week														
Poll	Pre	1	2	3	4	5	6	7	8	9	10	11	12	13	Final
Sports Network	RV	RV	RV	RV	RV	RV	RV	RV	RV	RV	RV	RV	—	—	—
Coaches	RV	RV	RV	RV	24	23	RV	RV	RV	RV	—	—	—	—	—
