= 2014 Western Illinois Leathernecks football team =

American college football season

2014 Western Illinois Leathernecks football
- Conference: Missouri Valley Football Conference
- Record: 5–7 (3–5 MVFC)
- Head coach: Bob Nielson (2nd season)
- Defensive coordinator: Brian Ward (3rd season)
- Home stadium: Hanson Field

2014 Missouri Valley Football Conference standings
	Conf.			Overall
Team	W		L	W		L
No. 1 North Dakota State +^	7	–	1	15	–	1
No. 2 Illinois State +^	7	–	1	13	–	2
No. 10 Northern Iowa ^	6	–	2	9	–	5
No. 12 South Dakota St. ^	5	–	3	9	–	5
No. 19 Indiana State ^	4	–	4	8	–	6
No. 22 Youngstown State	4	–	4	7	–	5
Southern Illinois	3	–	5	6	–	6
Western Illinois	3	–	5	5	–	7
Missouri State	1	–	7	4	–	8
South Dakota	0	–	8	2	–	10
+ – Conference co-champions; ^ – FCS playoff participant; Rankings from The Sports Network poll

The 2014 Western Illinois Leathernecks football team represented Western Illinois University as a member of the Missouri Valley Football Conference (MVFC) during the 2014 NCAA Division I FCS football season. Led by second-year head coach Bob Nielson, the Leathernecks compiled an overall record of 5–7 overall with mark of 3–5 in conference play, tying for seventh place in the MVFC. Western Illinois played home games at Hanson Field in Macomb, Illinois.

The team gave up the quickest score in the history of college football. In the opening kickoff against Wisconsin, the kick returner stepped out of the end zone before returning and taking a knee the end zone for a safety. One second had elapsed off the clock.

== Schedule ==
Date	Time	Opponent	Site	TV	Result	Attendance
August 28	6:00 pm	Valparaiso*	Hanson Field; Macomb, IL	WIUtv3	W 45–6	3,584
September 6	11:00 am	at No. 18 (FBS) Wisconsin*	Camp Randall Stadium; Madison, WI	BTN	L 3–37	77,125
September 13	3:00 pm	Drake*	Hanson Field; Macomb, IL	WIUtv3	W 38–13	9,445
September 20	11:00 am	at Northwestern*	Ryan Field; Evanston, IL	ESPNews	L 7–24	32,016
September 27	6:00 pm	at No. 17 Southern Illinois	Saluki Stadium; Carbondale, IL		L 17–34	13,170
October 4	3:00 pm	No. 1 North Dakota State^{†}	Hanson Field; Macomb, IL	Mediacom, ESPN3	L 10–17	5,111
October 11	6:00 pm	at No. 16 Youngstown State	Stambaugh Stadium; Youngstown, OH	ESPN3	W 30–24	12,771
October 18	3:00 pm	No. 10 Illinois State	Hanson Field; Macomb, IL	WIUtv3	L 34–37	4,641
October 25	1:00 pm	No. 23 Northern Iowa	Hanson Field; Macomb, IL	WIUtv3	L 13–27	2,588
November 8	4:00 pm	at South Dakota	DakotaDome; Vermillion, SD		W 44–29	7,145
November 15	2:00 pm	at No. 19 South Dakota State	Coughlin–Alumni Stadium; Brookings, SD		L 24–59	3,204
November 22	1:00 pm	No. 18 Indiana State	Hanson Field; Macomb, IL	WIUtv3	W 34–20	1,783
*Non-conference game; ^{†}Homecoming; Rankings from The Sports Network Poll released prior to the game; All times are in Central time

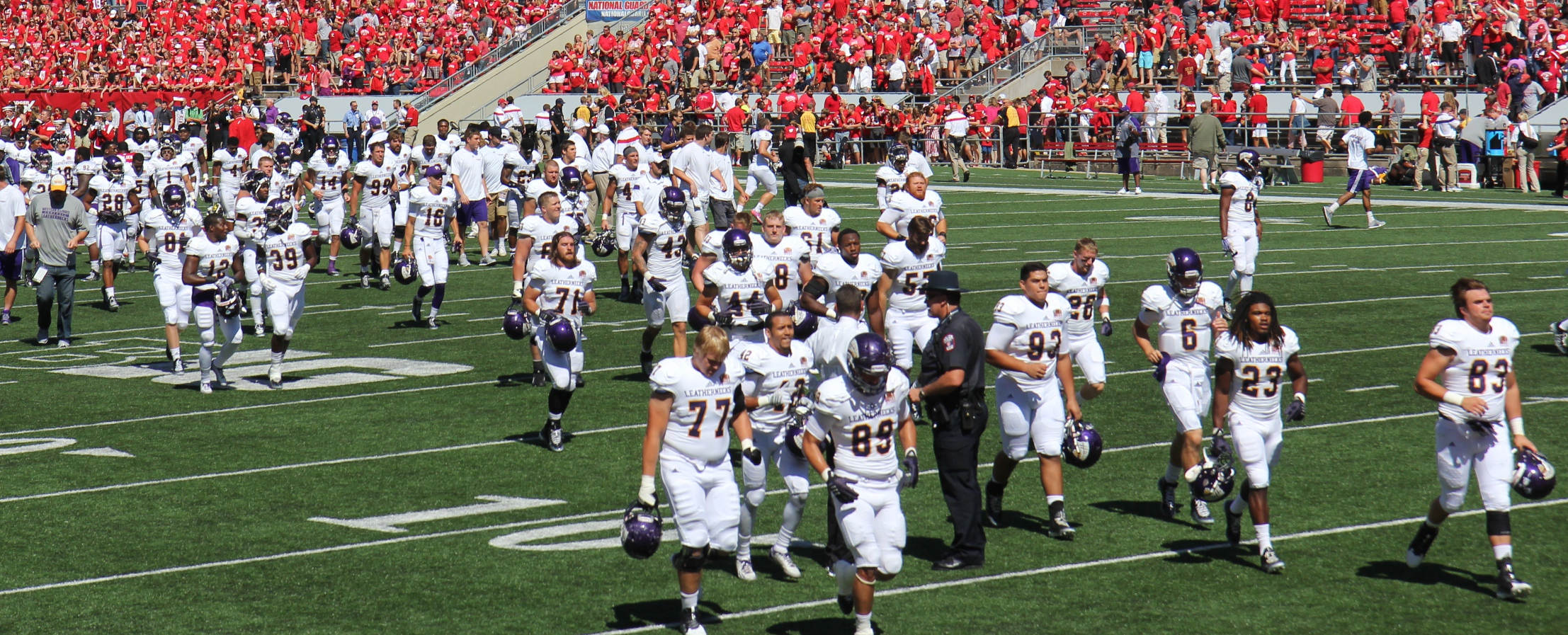
2014 team leaving after Wisconsin loss

== Roster ==
2014 Western Illinois Leathernecks football team roster
Players
Coaches
Offense

Pos.	#	Name	Class
WR	1	Joey Borsellino	So
WR	80	Nick Schroeder	Fr
WR	82	Jaelon Acklin	Fr

Defense

Pos.	#	Name	Class
DT	90	Jean-Marc Charles	Jr

Special teams

Pos.	#	Name	Class

Head coach

- Bob Nielson

Coordinators/assistant coaches

Legend

- (C) Team captain
- (S) Suspended
- (I) Ineligible
- Injured
- Redshirt

Roster
