= 2014 South Dakota State Jackrabbits football team =

American college football season

2014 South Dakota State Jackrabbits football

NCAA DIvision I Second Round, L 24–27 at North Dakota State
- Conference: Missouri Valley Football Conference

Ranking
- Sports Network: No. 12
- FCS Coaches: No. 13
- Record: 9–5 (5–3 MVFC)
- Head coach: John Stiegelmeier (17th season)
- Offensive coordinator: Eric Eidsness (9th season)
- Defensive coordinator: Clint Brown (6th season)
- Home stadium: Coughlin–Alumni Stadium

2014 Missouri Valley Football Conference standings
	Conf.			Overall
Team	W		L	W		L
No. 1 North Dakota State +^	7	–	1	15	–	1
No. 2 Illinois State +^	7	–	1	13	–	2
No. 10 Northern Iowa ^	6	–	2	9	–	5
No. 12 South Dakota St. ^	5	–	3	9	–	5
No. 19 Indiana State ^	4	–	4	8	–	6
No. 22 Youngstown State	4	–	4	7	–	5
Southern Illinois	3	–	5	6	–	6
Western Illinois	3	–	5	5	–	7
Missouri State	1	–	7	4	–	8
South Dakota	0	–	8	2	–	10
+ – Conference co-champions; ^ – FCS playoff participant; Rankings from The Sports Network poll

The 2014 South Dakota State Jackrabbits football team represented South Dakota State University as a member of the Missouri Valley Football Conference (MVFC) during the 2014 NCAA Division I FCS football season. Led by 18th-year head coach John Stiegelmeier, the Jackrabbits compiled an overall record of 9–5 with a mark of 5–3 in conference play, placing fourth in the MVFC. South Dakota State received an at–large bid to the NCAA Division I Football Championship playoffs, where the Jackrabbits defeated Montana State in the first round before falling to fellow MVFC member and eventual national champion, North Dakota State, in the second round. The team played home games at Coughlin–Alumni Stadium in Brookings, South Dakota.

== Schedule ==
Date	Time	Opponent	Rank	Site	TV	Result	Attendance
August 30	2:30 pm	at No. 24 (FBS) Missouri*	No. 10	Faurot Field; Columbia, MO	ESPNU	L 18–38	60,589
September 6	6:00 pm	Cal Poly*	No. 12	Coughlin–Alumni Stadium; Brookings, SD		W 44–18	12,219
September 13	7:00 pm	at Southern Utah*	No. 11	Eccles Coliseum; Ceder City, UT		W 26–6	5,017
September 20	6:00 pm	Wisconsin–Oshkosh*	No. 10	Coughlin–Alumni Stadium; Brookings, SD		W 41–3	13,731
October 4	2:00 pm	at No. 22 Illinois State	No. 9	Hancock Stadium; Normal, IL		L 10–45	10,919
October 11	6:00 pm	Missouri State^{†}	No. 19	Coughlin–Alumni Stadium; Brookings, SD	Midco SN	W 32–28	11,348
October 18	4:00 pm	at No. 20 Northern Iowa	No. 18	UNI-Dome; Cedar Falls, IA		W 31–28	15,049
October 25	2:00 pm	No. 17 Youngstown State	No. 13	Coughlin–Alumni Stadium; Brookings, SD		L 27–30	14,480
November 1	2:30 pm	at No. 1 North Dakota State	No. 18	Fargodome; Fargo, ND (Dakota Marker)	Midco SN	L 17–37	18,832
November 8	12:00 pm	at No. 17 Indiana State	No. 22	Memorial Stadium; Terre Haute, IN		W 32–17	4,905
November 15	2:00 pm	Western Illinois	No. 19	Coughlin–Alumni Stadium; Brookings, SD		W 59–24	3,204
November 22	2:00 pm	South Dakota	No. 16	Coughlin–Alumni Stadium; Brookings, SD (rivalry)	Midco SN	W 37–14	10,631
November 29	3:00 pm	at No. 17 Montana State*	No. 14	Bobcat Stadium; Bozeman, MT (NCAA Division I First Round)	ESPN3	W 47–40	7,747
December 6	2:30 pm	at No. 2 North Dakota State	No. 14	Fargodome; Fargo, ND (NCAA Division I Second Round)	ESPN3	L 24–27	18,113
*Non-conference game; ^{†}Homecoming; Rankings from The Sports Network Poll released prior to the game; All times are in Central time

== Rankings ==
Ranking movements Legend: ██ Increase in ranking ██ Decrease in ranking
	Week														
Poll	Pre	1	2	3	4	5	6	7	8	9	10	11	12	13	Final
Sports Network	10	12	11	10	9	9	19	18	13	18	22	19	16	14	12
Coaches	10	11	10	10	9	9	19	16	15	19	22	19	15	13	13
