= 2000 Colgate Red Raiders football team =

American college football season

2000 Colgate Red Raiders football
- Conference: Patriot League
- Record: 7–4 (4–2 Patriot)
- Head coach: Dick Biddle (5th season)
- Captains: Barry HoAire; Alex Houston; Randall Joseph
- Home stadium: Andy Kerr Stadium

2000 Patriot League football standings
	Conf.			Overall
Team	W		L	W		L
No. 8 Lehigh $^	6	–	0	12	–	1
Colgate	4	–	2	7	–	4
Holy Cross	4	–	2	7	–	4
Towson	3	–	3	7	–	4
Bucknell	2	–	4	6	–	5
Fordham	1	–	5	3	–	8
Lafayette	1	–	5	2	–	9
$ – Conference champion; ^ – NCAA Division I-AA playoff participant; Rankings from The Sports Network poll

The 2000 Colgate Red Raiders football team was an American football team that represented Colgate University during the 2000 NCAA Division I-AA football season. Colgate tied for second in the Patriot League.

In its fifth season under head coach Dick Biddle, the team compiled a 7–4 record. Barry HoAire, Randall Joseph and Alex Houston were the team captains.

Despite their winning record, the Red Raiders were outscored 240 to 235. Their 4–2 conference record tied for second place in the seven-team Patriot League standings.

Colgate was ranked No. 25 in the preseason national Division I-AA poll, but dropped out of the top 25 before it had played a game, and remained unranked for the remainder of the year.

This season marked the final appearance of "Red Raiders" as Colgate's team name. In August 2001, the university trustees announced that all Colgate athletic teams would be known simply as "Raiders". Though the name "Red Raiders" was not originally a reference to Native Americans, such imagery had built up over the years, and the students and faculty who had asked for the change cited increasing sensitivity to racial stereotypes as their reason.

The team played its home games at Andy Kerr Stadium in Hamilton, New York.

== Schedule ==
Date	Opponent	Site	Result	Attendance	Source
September 9	at Connecticut*	Memorial Stadium; Storrs, CT	L 7–37	16,632	
September 16	at Dartmouth*	Memorial Field; Hanover, NH	W 42–24	4,916	
September 23	Fordham	Andy Kerr Stadium; Hamilton, NY	W 21–6	4,012	
September 30	at Towson	Minnegan Stadium; Towson, MD	W 30–27 ^{OT}	3,038	
October 7	Princeton*	Andy Kerr Stadium; Hamilton, NY	W 34–6	4,019	
October 14	at Cornell*	Schoellkopf Field; Ithaca, NY (rivalry)	W 23–16	7,610	
October 21	Saint Mary's*	Andy Kerr Stadium; Hamilton, NY	L 20–37	3,927	
October 28	Lafayette	Andy Kerr Stadium; Hamilton, NY	W 17–14	5,290	
November 4	at No. 9 Lehigh	Goodman Stadium; Bethlehem, PA	L 14–20	13,316	
November 11	Holy Cross	Andy Kerr Stadium; Hamilton, NY	L 3–32	2,114	
November 18	at Bucknell	Christy Mathewson–Memorial Stadium; Lewisburg, PA	W 24–21	2,814	
*Non-conference game; Rankings from The Sports Network Poll released prior to the game
