= 2014 South Dakota Coyotes football team =

American college football season

2014 South Dakota Coyotes football
- Conference: Missouri Valley Football Conference
- Record: 2–10 (0–8 MVFC)
- Head coach: Joe Glenn (3rd season)
- Offensive coordinator: Wesley Beschorner (6th season)
- Offensive scheme: Spread
- Defensive coordinator: Jason Petrino (3rd season)
- Base defense: 4–3
- Home stadium: DakotaDome

2014 Missouri Valley Football Conference standings
| | Conf. | | | Overall |
| Team | W | | L | W | | L |
|---|---|---|---|---|---|---|
| No. 1 North Dakota State +^ | 7 | – | 1 | 15 | – | 1 |
| No. 2 Illinois State +^ | 7 | – | 1 | 13 | – | 2 |
| No. 10 Northern Iowa ^ | 6 | – | 2 | 9 | – | 5 |
| No. 12 South Dakota St. ^ | 5 | – | 3 | 9 | – | 5 |
| No. 19 Indiana State ^ | 4 | – | 4 | 8 | – | 6 |
| No. 22 Youngstown State | 4 | – | 4 | 7 | – | 5 |
| Southern Illinois | 3 | – | 5 | 6 | – | 6 |
| Western Illinois | 3 | – | 5 | 5 | – | 7 |
| Missouri State | 1 | – | 7 | 4 | – | 8 |
| South Dakota | 0 | – | 8 | 2 | – | 10 |
+ – Conference co-champions; ^ – FCS playoff participant; Rankings from The Sports Network poll

The 2014 South Dakota Coyotes football team represented the University of South Dakota in the 2014 NCAA Division I FCS football season. They were led by third year head coach Joe Glenn and played their home games in the DakotaDome. They were a member of the Missouri Valley Football Conference. They finished the season 2–10, 0–8 in MVFC play to finish in last place.

== Schedule ==
| Date | Time | Opponent | Site | TV | Result | Attendance |
|---|---|---|---|---|---|---|
| August 30 | 9:30 pm | at No. 3 (FBS) Oregon* | Autzen Stadium; Eugene, OR | P12N | L 13–62 | 57,388 |
| September 6 | 2:00 pm | William Penn* | DakotaDome; Vermillion, SD | Midco SN | W 41–16 | 8,242 |
| September 13 | 8:00 pm | at No. 4 Montana* | Washington–Grizzly Stadium; Missoula, MT | SWX | L 20–28 | 26,303 |
| September 20 | 2:00 pm | No. 22 Northern Arizona* | DakotaDome; Vermillion, SD | Midco SN | W 28–21 | 8,314 |
| October 4 | 6:00 pm | at No. 15 Southern Illinois | Saluki Stadium; Carbondale, IL | | L 10–41 | 8,144 |
| October 11 | 3:00 pm | No. 21 Northern Iowa | DakotaDome; Vermillion, SD | | L 16–27 | 10,219 |
| October 18 | 2:00 pm | at Missouri State | Robert W. Plaster Stadium; Springfield, MO | | L 12–31 | 15,537 |
| October 25 | 2:00 pm | No. 1 North Dakota State | DakotaDome; Vermillion, SD | Midco SN | L 7–47 | 9,823 |
| November 1 | 1:00 pm | at No. 11 Youngstown State | Stambaugh Stadium; Youngstown, OH | ESPN3 | L 17–28 | 8,274 |
| November 8 | 4:00 pm | Western Illinois | DakotaDome; Vermillion, SD | Midco SN | L 29–44 | 7,145 |
| November 15 | 1:00 pm | No. 8 Illinois State | DakotaDome; Vermillion, SD | | L 26–45 | 6,712 |
| November 22 | 2:00 pm | at No. 16 South Dakota State | Coughlin–Alumni Stadium; Brookings, SD (rivalry) | Midco SN | L 14–37 | 10,631 |
*Non-conference game; Rankings from The Sports Network at time of game Poll released prior to the game; All times are in Central time

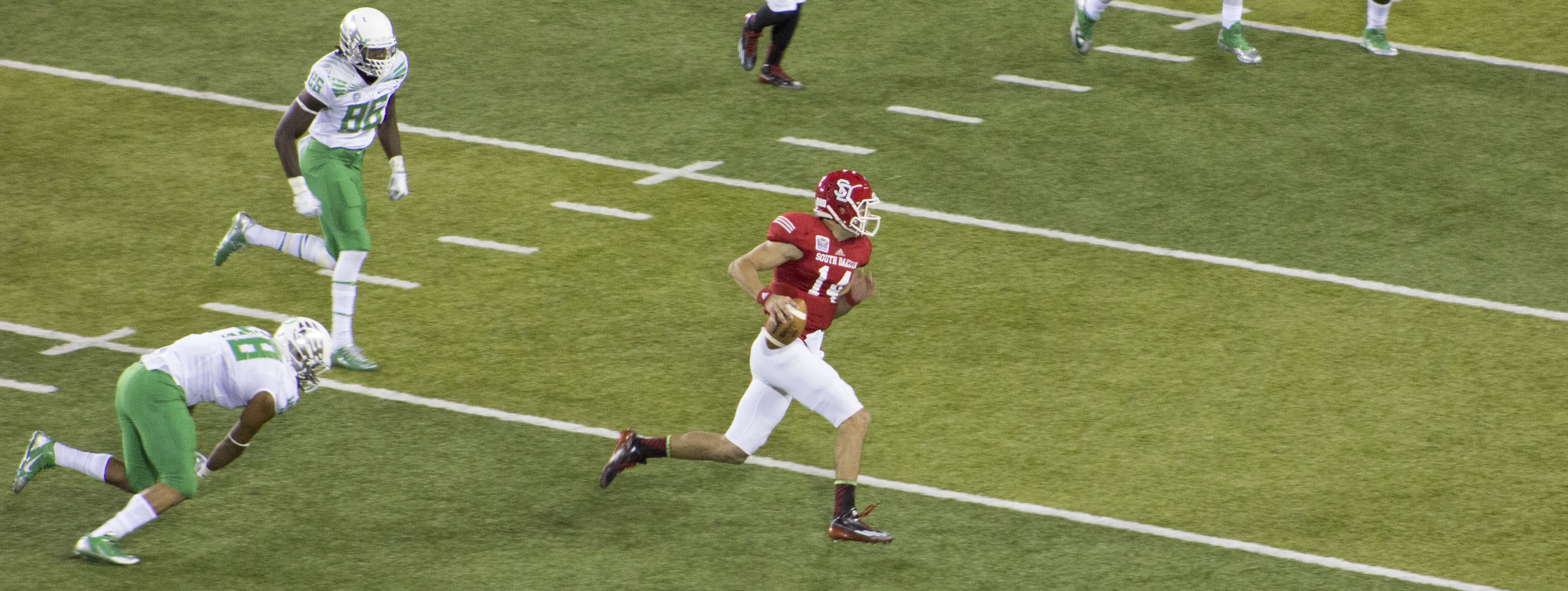
Kevin Earl runs against Oregon
