= 2000 Bucknell Bison football team =

American college football season

2000 Bucknell Bison football
- Conference: Patriot League
- Record: 6–5 (2–4 Patriot)
- Head coach: Tom Gadd (6th season)
- Captains: Vince Ficca; Justin Lustig; Lucas Phillips
- Home stadium: Christy Mathewson–Memorial Stadium

2000 Patriot League football standings
	Conf.			Overall
Team	W		L	W		L
No. 8 Lehigh $^	6	–	0	12	–	1
Colgate	4	–	2	7	–	4
Holy Cross	4	–	2	7	–	4
Towson	3	–	3	7	–	4
Bucknell	2	–	4	6	–	5
Fordham	1	–	5	3	–	8
Lafayette	1	–	5	2	–	9
$ – Conference champion; ^ – NCAA Division I-AA playoff participant; Rankings from The Sports Network poll

The 2000 Bucknell Bison football team was an American football team that represented Bucknell University during the 2000 NCAA Division I-AA football season. It finished fifth in the Patriot League.

Bucknell played its home games at Christy Mathewson–Memorial Stadium on the university campus in Lewisburg, Pennsylvania.

In its sixth year under head coach Tom Gadd, the Bison compiled a 6–5 record. Vince Ficca, Justin Lustig and Lucas Phillips were the team captains.

The Bison outscored opponents 242 to 172. Their 2–4 conference record placed fifth in the seven-team Patriot League standings.

== Schedule ==
Date	Opponent	Site	Result	Attendance	Source
September 2	at Richmond*	University of Richmond Stadium; Richmond, VA	L 7–10		
September 16	Cornell*	Christy Mathewson–Memorial Stadium; Lewisburg, PA	W 38–15	3,866	
September 23	Columbia^*	Christy Mathewson–Memorial Stadium; Lewisburg, PA	W 12–10	6,119	
September 30	Duquesne*	Christy Mathewson–Memorial Stadium; Lewisburg, PA	W 35–14	2,779	
October 7	at Georgetown*	Kehoe Field; Washington, DC	W 24–10	1,302	
October 14	Lafayette	Christy Mathewson–Memorial Stadium; Lewisburg, PA	W 42–30		
October 21	at No. 13 Lehigh	Goodman Stadium; Bethlehem, PA	L 14–21	16,906	
October 28	Fordham^{†}	Christy Mathewson–Memorial Stadium; Lewisburg, PA	W 27–13	5,128	
November 4	at Holy Cross	Fitton Field; Worcester, MA	L 9–10		
November 11	at Towson	Minnegan Stadium; Towson, MD	L 13–15	4,332	
November 18	Colgate	Christy Mathewson–Memorial Stadium; Lewisburg, PA	L 21–24	2,814	
*Non-conference game; ^{†}Homecoming; ^ Parents Weekend; Rankings from The Sports Network Poll released prior to the game
