= 2000 Yale Bulldogs football team =

American college football season

2000 Yale Bulldogs football
- Conference: Ivy League
- Record: 7–3 (4–3 Ivy)
- Head coach: Jack Siedlecki (4th season)
- Home stadium: Yale Bowl

2000 Ivy League football standings
	Conf.			Overall
Team	W		L	W		L
Penn $	6	–	1	7	–	3
Cornell	5	–	2	5	–	5
Yale	4	–	3	7	–	3
Harvard	4	–	3	5	–	5
Princeton	3	–	4	3	–	7
Columbia	1	–	6	3	–	7
Dartmouth	1	–	6	2	–	8
Brown *	4	–	3	7	–	3
$ – Conference champion; * Ineligible for conference championship

The 2000 Yale Bulldogs football team represented Yale University in the 2000 NCAA Division I-AA football season. The Bulldogs were led by fourth-year head coach Jack Siedlecki, played their home games at the Yale Bowl and finished third in the Ivy League with a 4–3 record, 7–3 overall. Yale averaged 23,136 fans per game.

== Schedule ==
Date	Opponent	Site	Result	Attendance	Source
September 16	Dayton*	Yale Bowl; New Haven, CT	W 42–6	20,903	
September 23	at Cornell	Schoellkopf Field; Ithaca, NY	L 23–24	16,634	
September 30	Holy Cross*	Yale Bowl; New Haven, CT	W 33–27	22,509	
October 7	at Dartmouth	Memorial Field; Hanover, NH	W 24–14	7,107	
October 14	at Fordham*	Coffey Field; Bronx, NY	W 24–17	5,837	
October 21	Penn	Yale Bowl; New Haven, CT	W 27–24	35,050	
October 28	Columbia	Yale Bowl; New Haven, CT	W 41–0	17,578	
November 4	at Brown	Brown Stadium; Providence, RI	L 14–28	7,873	
November 11	Princeton	Yale Bowl; New Haven, CT (rivalry)	L 14–19	19,671	
November 18	at Harvard	Harvard Stadium; Boston, MA (The Game)	W 34–24	30,898	
*Non-conference game

== Roster ==
2000 Yale Bulldogs football team roster
Players
Coaches
Offense

Pos.	#	Name	Class
QB	1	Rich Ting	Jr
QB	2	T. J. Hyland	Jr
QB	11	Peter Lee	Jr
WR	21	Eric Johnson	Sr

Defense

Pos.	#	Name	Class
CB	8	Than Merrill	Sr

Special teams

Pos.	#	Name	Class

Head coach

- Jack Siedlecki

Coordinators/assistant coaches

Legend

- (C) Team captain
- (S) Suspended
- (I) Ineligible
- Injured
- Redshirt

Roster

== NFL draft ==
The following Bulldogs were selected in the National Football League draft following the season.

Round	Pick	Player	Position	NFL team
7	223	Than Merrill	DB	Tampa Bay Buccaneers
7	224	Eric Johnson	TE	San Francisco 49ers
