= 2000 Cornell Big Red football team =

American college football season

2000 Cornell Big Red football
- Conference: Ivy League
- Record: 5–5 (5–2 Ivy)
- Head coach: Pete Mangurian (3rd season)
- Defensive coordinator: Greg Gigantino (3rd season)
- Captains: Joe Splendorio; Dan Weyandt
- Home stadium: Schoellkopf Field

2000 Ivy League football standings
	Conf.			Overall
Team	W		L	W		L
Penn $	6	–	1	7	–	3
Cornell	5	–	2	5	–	5
Yale	4	–	3	7	–	3
Harvard	4	–	3	5	–	5
Princeton	3	–	4	3	–	7
Columbia	1	–	6	3	–	7
Dartmouth	1	–	6	2	–	8
Brown *	4	–	3	7	–	3
$ – Conference champion; * Ineligible for conference championship

The 2000 Cornell Big Red football team was an American football team that represented Cornell University during the 2000 NCAA Division I-AA football season. Cornell finished second in the Ivy League.

In its third and final season under head coach Pete Mangurian, the team compiled a 5–5 record and was outscored 334 to 264. Joe Splendorio and Dan Weyandt were team captains.

Cornell's 5–2 conference record placed second in the Ivy League standings. Despite their winning record, the Big Red were outscored 238 to 217 by Ivy opponents.

Cornell played its home games at Schoellkopf Field in Ithaca, New York.

== Schedule ==
Date	Opponent	Site	Result	Attendance	Source
September 16	at Bucknell*	Christy Mathewson–Memorial Stadium; Lewisburg, PA	L 15–38	3,866	
September 23	Yale	Schoellkopf Field; Ithaca, NY	W 24–23	16,634	
September 30	at No. 20 Lehigh*	Goodman Stadium; Bethlehem, PA	L 16–35	11,126	
October 7	at Harvard	Harvard Stadium; Boston, MA	W 29–28		
October 14	Colgate*	Schoellkopf Field; Ithaca, NY (rivalry)	L 16–23	7,610	
October 21	at Brown*	Brown Stadium; Providence, RI	L 40–56	15,126	
October 28	Princeton	Schoellkopf Field; Ithaca, NY	W 25–24	4,952	
November 4	Dartmouth	Schoellkopf Field; Ithaca, NY (rivalry)	W 49–31	4,518	
November 11	at Columbia	Wien Stadium; New York, NY (rivalry)	W 35–31	9,102	
November 18	Penn	Schoellkopf Field; Ithaca, NY (rivalry)	L 15–45	9,014	
*Non-conference game; Rankings from The Sports Network Poll released prior to the game

== Roster ==
2000 Cornell Big Red football team roster
Players			Coaches
Offense: Pos. / # / Name / Class; QB / 6 / Jay Posner / Sr	Defense: Pos. / # / Name / Class	Special teams: Pos. / # / Name / Class	Head coach: Bob Blackman; Coordinators/assistant coaches Legend: (C) Team captain; (S) Suspended; (I) Ineligible; Injured; Redshirt; Roster
