= 2014 Butler Bulldogs football team =

American college football season

2014 Butler Bulldogs football
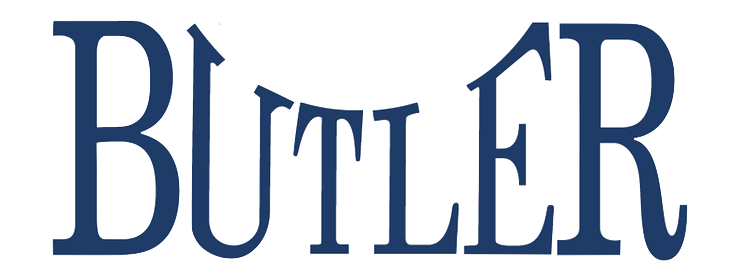
- Conference: Pioneer Football League
- Record: 4–7 (2–6 PFL)
- Head coach: Jeff Voris (9th season)
- Co-defensive coordinators: Joe Cheshire (5th season); Tim Cooper (5th season)
- Home stadium: Butler Bowl

2014 Pioneer Football League standings
	Conf.			Overall
Team	W		L	W		L
San Diego $^	7	–	1	9	–	3
Jacksonville *	7	–	1	9	–	2
Dayton	6	–	2	8	–	3
Drake	6	–	2	7	–	4
Campbell	4	–	4	5	–	7
Marist	4	–	4	4	–	7
Stetson	3	–	5	5	–	7
Morehead State	3	–	5	4	–	8
Butler	2	–	6	4	–	7
Valparaiso	2	–	6	4	–	8
Davidson	0	–	8	1	–	11
$ – Conference champion; ^ – FCS playoff participant; *Jacksonville ineligible for PFL title and FCS playoffs due to matters regarding the PFL's financial aid rules

The 2014 Butler Bulldogs football team represented Butler University as a member of the Pioneer Football League (PFL) during the 2014 NCAA Division I FCS football season. Led by ninth-year head coach Jeff Voris, Bulldogs compiled an overall record of 4–7 with a mark of 2–6 in conference play, tying for ninth place in the PFL. Butler played home games at the Butler Bowl in Indianapolis.

== Schedule ==
Date	Time	Opponent	Site	TV	Result	Attendance
September 6	7:00 pm	at Wittenberg*	Edwards–Maurer Field; Springfield, OH		W 22–16	3,152
September 13	4:00 pm	at No. 21 Youngstown State*	Stambaugh Stadium; Youngstown, OH	WYTV	L 13–44	14,381
September 20	6:30 pm	Taylor*	Butler Bowl; Indianapolis, IN		W 38–3	3,249
September 27	12:00 pm	Jacksonville^{†}	Butler Bowl; Indianapolis, IN		L 7–35	3,188
October 4	6:00 pm	at Stetson	Spec Martin Stadium; DeLand, FL		W 49–41	3,912
October 11	12:00 pm	at Campbell	Barker–Lane Stadium; Buies Creek, NC		L 9–28	3,872
October 18	12:00 pm	San Diego	Butler Bowl; Indianapolis, IN		L 21–27	1,808
October 25	2:00 pm	at Drake	Drake Stadium; Des Moines, IA		L 19–21	2,914
November 1	12:00 pm	Morehead State	Butler Bowl; Indianapolis, IN		W 62–52	2,877
November 8	2:00 pm	at Valparaiso	Brown Field; Valparaiso, IN (Hoosier Helmet Trophy)		L 3–17	1,867
November 15	12:00 pm	Dayton	Butler Bowl; Indianapolis, IN		L 14–21	2,034
*Non-conference game; ^{†}Homecoming; Rankings from The Sports Network Poll released prior to the game; All times are in Eastern time
