= 2000 La Salle Explorers football team =

American college football season

2000 La Salle Explorers football
- Conference: Metro Atlantic Athletic Conference
- Record: 7–4 (4–3 MAAC)
- Head coach: Bill Manlove (4th season)
- Home stadium: McCarthy Stadium

2000 Metro Atlantic Athletic Conference football standings
	Conf.			Overall
Team	W		L	W		L
Duquesne $	8	–	0	10	–	1
Fairfield	7	–	1	8	–	2
Marist	5	–	3	6	–	4
Georgetown	3	–	2	5	–	6
La Salle	4	–	3	7	–	4
Iona	3	–	5	4	–	7
Saint Peter's	2	–	6	4	–	7
Siena	1	–	6	1	–	9
Canisius	0	–	7	0	–	10
$ – Conference champion

The 2000 La Salle Explorers football team was an American football team that represented La Salle University as a member of the Metro Atlantic Athletic Conference (MAAC) during the 2000 NCAA Division I-AA football season. In their fourth year under head coach Bill Manlove, the Explorers compiled an overall record of 7–4 with a mark of 4–3 in conference play, placing fifth in the MAAC.

== Schedule ==
Date	Opponent	Site	Result	Attendance	Source
September 2	at Saint Francis (PA)*	Pine Bowl; Loretto, PA	W 14–0	833	
September 9	Duquesne	McCarthy Stadium; Philadelphia, PA	L 7–30	2,325	
September 16	at Iona	Mazzella Field; New Rochelle, NY	W 29–22		
September 23	Siena	McCarthy Stadium; Philadelphia, PA	W 28–15		
September 30	at Catholic University*	Cardinal Stadium; Washington, DC	W 35–10	2,300	
October 7	at Canisius	Demske Field; Buffalo, NY	W 23–10		
October 21	Shenandoah*	McCarthy Stadium; Philadelphia, PA	W 39–14		
October 28	at St. John's*	DaSilva Field; Queens, NY	L 2–28	1,215	
November 4	Saint Peter's	McCarthy Stadium; Philadelphia, PA	W 21–7		
November 11	Marist	McCarthy Stadium; Philadelphia, PA	L 12–13	2,352	
November 18	Fairfield	McCarthy Stadium; Philadelphia, PA	L 7–62		
*Non-conference game
