= 2000 Towson Tigers football team =

American college football season

2000 Towson Tigers football
- Conference: Patriot League
- Record: 7–4 (3–3 Patriot)
- Head coach: Gordy Combs (9th season)
- Home stadium: Minnegan Stadium

2000 Patriot League football standings
	Conf.			Overall
Team	W		L	W		L
No. 8 Lehigh $^	6	–	0	12	–	1
Colgate	4	–	2	7	–	4
Holy Cross	4	–	2	7	–	4
Towson	3	–	3	7	–	4
Bucknell	2	–	4	6	–	5
Fordham	1	–	5	3	–	8
Lafayette	1	–	5	2	–	9
$ – Conference champion; ^ – NCAA Division I-AA playoff participant; Rankings from The Sports Network poll

The 2000 Towson Tigers football team was an American football team that represented Towson University during the 2000 NCAA Division I-AA football season. Towson tied for last in the Patriot League.

In their ninth year under head coach Gordy Combs, the Tigers compiled a 7–4 record.

The Tigers outscored opponents 299 to 216. Their 3–3 conference record placed fourth in the seven-team Patriot League standings.

Towson played its home games at Minnegan Stadium on the university campus in Towson, Maryland.

== Schedule ==
Date	Opponent	Site	Result	Attendance	Source
September 2	at Fordham	Coffey Field; Bronx, NY	W 36–13	3,792	
September 9	at Lafayette	Fisher Field; Easton, PA	W 42–20	5,229	
September 16	Morgan State*	Minnegan Stadium; Towson, MD	W 31–7	4,817	
September 23	at Holy Cross	Fitton Field; Worcester, MA	L 14–17	7,856	
September 30	Colgate	Minnegan Stadium; Towson, MD	L 27–30 ^{OT}	3,038	
October 7	No. 17 Lehigh	Minnegan Stadium; Towson, MD	L 21–42		
October 14	Howard*	Minnegan Stadium; Towson, MD	W 38–6	4,512	
October 28	at Monmouth*	Kessler Field; West Long Branch, NJ	W 12–0	2,863	
November 4	at Saint Mary's*	Saint Mary's Stadium; Moraga, CA	L 33–45	2,042	
November 11	Bucknell	Minnegan Stadium; Towson, MD	W 15–13	4,332	
November 18	at Drake*	Drake Stadium; Des Moines, IA	W 30–23	2,222	
*Non-conference game; Rankings from The Sports Network Poll released prior to the game
