= 2014 Morehead State Eagles football team =

American college football season

2014 Morehead State Eagles football
- Conference: Pioneer Football League
- Record: 4–8 (3–5 PFL)
- Head coach: Rob Tenyer (2nd season)
- Offensive coordinator: Craig Mullins
- Defensive coordinator: Phil Burnett
- Home stadium: Jayne Stadium

2014 Pioneer Football League standings
	Conf.			Overall
Team	W		L	W		L
San Diego $^	7	–	1	9	–	3
Jacksonville *	7	–	1	9	–	2
Dayton	6	–	2	8	–	3
Drake	6	–	2	7	–	4
Campbell	4	–	4	5	–	7
Marist	4	–	4	4	–	7
Stetson	3	–	5	5	–	7
Morehead State	3	–	5	4	–	8
Butler	2	–	6	4	–	7
Valparaiso	2	–	6	4	–	8
Davidson	0	–	8	1	–	11
$ – Conference champion; ^ – FCS playoff participant; *Jacksonville ineligible for PFL title and FCS playoffs due to matters regarding the PFL's financial aid rules

The 2014 Morehead State Eagles football team represented Morehead State University in the 2014 NCAA Division I FCS football season. They were led by second-year head coach Rob Tenyer and played their home games at Jayne Stadium. They were a member of the Pioneer Football League. They finished the season 4–8, 3–5 in PFL play to finish in a tie for seventh place.

== Schedule ==
Date	Time	Opponent	Site	TV	Result	Attendance
August 30	6:00 pm	at No. 20 Richmond*	Robins Stadium; Richmond, VA		L 10–55	7,725
September 6	6:00 pm	Pikeville*	Jayne Stadium; Morehead, KY	WYMT	W 49–36	8,918
September 13	6:00 pm	at Eastern Kentucky*	Roy Kidd Stadium; Richmond, KY (Old Hawg Rifle)	OVCDN	L 13–55	16,700
September 20	1:00 pm	at Davidson	Richardson Stadium; Davidson, NC		W 40–32	2,972
October 4	1:00 pm	Campbell^{†}	Jayne Stadium; Morehead, KY	OVCDN	L 24–31	7,827
October 11	1:00 pm	Jacksonville	Jayne Stadium; Morehead, KY	OVCDN	L 26–45	3,755
October 18	1:00 pm	at Dayton	Welcome Stadium; Dayton, OH		L 7–41	3,014
October 25	1:00 pm	Valparaiso	Jayne Stadium; Morehead, KY	OVCDN	W 48–47	3,583
November 1	12:00 pm	at Butler	Butler Bowl; Indianapolis, IN		L 52–62	2,877
November 8	4:00 pm	at San Diego	Torero Stadium; San Diego, CA		L 28–49	1,184
November 15	1:00 pm	Stetson	Jayne Stadium; Morehead, KY	OVCDN	W 41–18	4,658
November 22	12:00 pm	at Charlotte*	Jerry Richardson Stadium; Charlotte, NC		L 14–52	10,826
*Non-conference game; ^{†}Homecoming; Rankings from The Sports Network Poll released prior to the game; All times are in Eastern time
