= 2000 Holy Cross Crusaders football team =

American college football season

2000 Holy Cross Crusaders football
- Conference: Patriot League
- Record: 7–4 (4–2 Patriot)
- Head coach: Dan Allen (5th season)
- Captains: David Puloka; Patrick Quay
- Home stadium: Fitton Field

2000 Patriot League football standings
	Conf.			Overall
Team	W		L	W		L
No. 8 Lehigh $^	6	–	0	12	–	1
Colgate	4	–	2	7	–	4
Holy Cross	4	–	2	7	–	4
Towson	3	–	3	7	–	4
Bucknell	2	–	4	6	–	5
Fordham	1	–	5	3	–	8
Lafayette	1	–	5	2	–	9
$ – Conference champion; ^ – NCAA Division I-AA playoff participant; Rankings from The Sports Network poll

The 2000 Holy Cross Crusaders football team was an American football team that represented the College of the Holy Cross during the 2000 NCAA Division I-AA football season. Holy Cross finished second in the Patriot League.

In their fifth year under head coach Dan Allen, the Crusaders compiled a 7–4 record. David Puloka and Patrick Quay were the team captains.

The Crusaders outscored opponents 245 to 223. Their 4–2 conference record placed second in the seven-team Patriot League standings.

Holy Cross played its home games at Fitton Field on the college campus in Worcester, Massachusetts.

== Schedule ==
Date	Opponent	Site	Result	Attendance	Source
September 9	at Georgetown*	Kehoe Field; Washington, DC	W 38–22	2,789	
September 16	at Harvard*	Harvard Stadium; Boston, MA	W 27–25	7,406	
September 23	Towson	Fitton Field; Worcester, MA	W 17–14	7,856	
September 30	at Yale*	Yale Bowl; New Haven, CT	L 27–33	22,509	
October 7	Penn^{†}*	Fitton Field; Worcester, MA	W 34–17	10,026	
October 14	at Dartmouth*	Memorial Field; Hanover, NH	L 14–31	5,014	
October 21	at Lafayette	Fisher Field; Easton, PA	L 13–28	6,723	
October 28	No. 12 Lehigh^	Fitton Field; Worcester, MA	L 6–21	9,228	
November 4	Bucknell	Fitton Field; Worcester, MA	W 10–9	6,147	
November 11	at Colgate	Andy Kerr Stadium; Hamilton, NY	W 32–3	2,114	
November 18	Fordham	Fitton Field; Worcester, MA (rivalry)	W 27–20	9,147	
*Non-conference game; ^{†}Homecoming; ^ Family Weekend; Rankings from The Sports Network Poll released prior to the game
