= 2000 Lehigh Mountain Hawks football team =

American college football season

2000 Lehigh Mountain Hawks football

Patriot League champion

NCAA Division I-AA Quarterfinal, L 22–47 at Delaware
- Conference: Patriot League

Ranking
- Sports Network: No. 8
- Record: 12–1 (6–0 Patriot)
- Head coach: Kevin Higgins (7th season)
- Defensive coordinator: Tom Gilmore (1st season)
- Captains: Matt Andrews; Bryant Appling; Dustin Grande; Brian McDonald
- Home stadium: Goodman Stadium

2000 Patriot League football standings
	Conf.			Overall
Team	W		L	W		L
No. 8 Lehigh $^	6	–	0	12	–	1
Colgate	4	–	2	7	–	4
Holy Cross	4	–	2	7	–	4
Towson	3	–	3	7	–	4
Bucknell	2	–	4	6	–	5
Fordham	1	–	5	3	–	8
Lafayette	1	–	5	2	–	9
$ – Conference champion; ^ – NCAA Division I-AA playoff participant; Rankings from The Sports Network poll

The 2000 Lehigh Mountain Hawks football team was an American football team that represented Lehigh University during the 2000 NCAA Division I-AA football season. Lehigh won its third consecutive Patriot League championship.

In their seventh year under head coach Kevin Higgins, the Mountain Hawks went undefeated (11–0) in the regular season, ending the year at 12–1 after losing in the second round of the national playoffs. Matt Andrews, Bryant Appling, Dustin Grande and Brian McDonald were the team captains.

Including playoff games, the Mountain Hawks outscored opponents 337 to 160. Their 6–0 conference record topped the seven-team Patriot League standings.

Lehigh was ranked No. 24 in the preseason national Division I-AA poll, but dropped out of the top 25 before its first game. After that opening win, the Mountain Hawks re-entered the rankings at No. 21 and steadily climbed to No. 8, where they ended the year.

Despite their conference championship and undefeated record, Lehigh did not host any playoff games. The Mountain Hawks defeated No. 6 Western Illinois and then lost to a familiar foe, No. 3 Delaware, on the road.

Lehigh played its home games at Goodman Stadium on the university's Goodman Campus in Bethlehem, Pennsylvania.

== Schedule ==
Date	Opponent	Rank	Site	Result	Attendance	Source
September 9	at Wofford*		Gibbs Stadium; Spartanburg, SC	W 34–14	8,413	
September 16	Penn*	No. 21	Goodman Stadium; Bethlehem, PA	W 17–10	10,124	
September 23	at Princeton*	No. 21	Princeton Stadium; Princeton, NJ	W 20–18	14,306	
September 30	Cornell*	No. 20	Goodman Stadium; Bethlehem, PA	W 35–16	11,126	
October 7	at Towson	No. 17	Minnegan Stadium; Towson, MD	W 42–21		
October 14	at Harvard*	No. 15	Harvard Stadium; Boston, MA	W 45–13	6,265	
October 21	Bucknell	No. 13	Goodman Stadium; Bethlehem, PA	W 21–14	16,906	
October 28	at Holy Cross	No. 12	Fitton Field; Worcester, MA	W 21–6	9,228	
November 4	Colgate	No. 9	Goodman Stadium; Bethlehem, PA	W 20–14	13,316	
November 11	Fordham	No. 8	Goodman Stadium; Bethlehem, PA	W 51–17	8,675	
November 18	at Lafayette	No. 8	Fisher Field; Easton, PA (The Rivalry)	W 31–17	12,586	
November 25	at No. 6 Western Illinois*	No. 8	Hanson Field; Macomb, IL (NCAA Division I-AA First Round)	W 37–7	3,204	
December 2	at No. 3 Delaware*	No. 8	Delaware Stadium; Newark, DE (NCAA Division I-AA Quarterfinal)	L 22–47	16,390	
*Non-conference game; Rankings from The Sports Network Poll released prior to the game
