= 2014 Youngstown State Penguins football team =

American college football season

2014 Youngstown State Penguins football
- Conference: Missouri Valley Football Conference

Ranking
- Sports Network: No. 22
- FCS Coaches: No. 25
- Record: 7–5 (4–4 MVFC)
- Head coach: Eric Wolford (5th season)
- Offensive coordinator: Shane Montgomery (5th season)
- Defensive coordinator: Jamie Bryant (1st season)
- Home stadium: Stambaugh Stadium

2014 Missouri Valley Football Conference standings
	Conf.			Overall
Team	W		L	W		L
No. 1 North Dakota State +^	7	–	1	15	–	1
No. 2 Illinois State +^	7	–	1	13	–	2
No. 10 Northern Iowa ^	6	–	2	9	–	5
No. 12 South Dakota St. ^	5	–	3	9	–	5
No. 19 Indiana State ^	4	–	4	8	–	6
No. 22 Youngstown State	4	–	4	7	–	5
Southern Illinois	3	–	5	6	–	6
Western Illinois	3	–	5	5	–	7
Missouri State	1	–	7	4	–	8
South Dakota	0	–	8	2	–	10
+ – Conference co-champions; ^ – FCS playoff participant; Rankings from The Sports Network poll

The 2014 Youngstown State Penguins football team represented Youngstown State University as a member of the Missouri Valley Football Conference (MVFC) during the 2014 NCAA Division I FCS football season. Led by Eric Wolford in his fifth and final season as head coach, the Penguins compiled an overall record of 7–5 with a mark of 4–4 in conference play, tying for fifth place in the MVFC. Youngstown State played their home games at Stambaugh Stadium in Youngstown, Ohio.

Wolford was fired on November 25. He finished his five-year tenure at Youngstown State with a record of 31–26.

== Schedule ==
Date	Time	Opponent	Rank	Site	TV	Result	Attendance
August 30	12:00 pm	at Illinois*	No. 24	Memorial Stadium; Champaign, IL	BTN	L 17–28	36,234
September 6	4:00 pm	Duquesne*	No. 23	Stambaugh Stadium; Youngstown, OH	MyYTV	W 34–23	10,525
September 13	4:00 pm	Butler*	No. 21	Stambaugh Stadium; Youngstown, OH	MyYTV	W 44–13	14,381
September 20	7:00 pm	Saint Francis (PA)*	No. 19	Stambaugh Stadium; Youngstown, OH	MyYTV	W 52–23	16,378
October 4	3:00 pm	at Missouri State	No. 18	Robert W. Plaster Stadium; Springfield, MO		W 14–7	12,218
October 11	7:00 pm	Western Illinois	No. 16	Stambaugh Stadium; Youngstown, OH	ESPN3, MyYTV	L 24–30	12,771
October 18	4:00 pm	No. 14 Southern Illinois^{†}	No. 21	Stambaugh Stadium; Youngstown, OH	ESPN3, MyYTV	W 26–14	12,698
October 25	3:00 pm	at No. 13 South Dakota State	No. 17	Coughlin–Alumni Stadium; Brookings, SD		W 30–27	14,480
November 1	2:00 pm	South Dakota	No. 11	Stambaugh Stadium; Youngstown, OH	ESPN3, MyYTV	W 28–17	8,274
November 8	2:00 pm	at No. 12 Illinois State	No. 10	Hancock Stadium; Normal, IL		L 21–35	8,271
November 15	2:00 pm	No. 23 Indiana State	No. 15	Stambaugh Stadium; Youngstown, OH	ESPN3, MyYTV	L 24–27 ^{OT}	9,642
November 22	3:30 pm	No. 3 North Dakota State	No. 20	Fargodome; Fargo, ND	ESPN3	L 14–38	18,696
*Non-conference game; ^{†}Homecoming; Rankings from The Sports Network Poll released prior to the game; All times are in Eastern time

^Game aired on a tape delayed basis

== Rankings ==
Ranking movements Legend: ██ Increase in ranking ██ Decrease in ranking
	Week														
Poll	Pre	1	2	3	4	5	6	7	8	9	10	11	12	13	Final
Sports Network	24	23	21	19	18	18	16	21	17	11	10	15	20	21	22
Coaches	21	21	16	15	12	12	10	19	16	13	13	16	20	25	25
