= 2000 Penn Quakers football team =

American college football season

2000 Penn Quakers football

Ivy League champion
- Conference: Ivy League
- Record: 7–3 (6–1 Ivy)
- Head coach: Al Bagnoli (9th season)
- Offensive coordinator: Andy Coen (1st season)
- Defensive coordinator: Ray Priore (3rd season)
- Home stadium: Franklin Field

2000 Ivy League football standings
| | Conf. | | | Overall |
| Team | W | | L | W | | L |
|---|---|---|---|---|---|---|
| Penn $ | 6 | – | 1 | 7 | – | 3 |
| Cornell | 5 | – | 2 | 5 | – | 5 |
| Yale | 4 | – | 3 | 7 | – | 3 |
| Harvard | 4 | – | 3 | 5 | – | 5 |
| Princeton | 3 | – | 4 | 3 | – | 7 |
| Columbia | 1 | – | 6 | 3 | – | 7 |
| Dartmouth | 1 | – | 6 | 2 | – | 8 |
| Brown * | 4 | – | 3 | 7 | – | 3 |
$ – Conference champion; * Ineligible for conference championship

The 2000 Penn Quakers football team represented the University of Pennsylvania in the 2000 NCAA Division I-AA football season.

== Schedule ==
| Date | Opponent | Site | Result | Attendance | Source |
|---|---|---|---|---|---|
| September 16 | at Lehigh* | Goodman Stadium; Bethlehem, PA | L 10–17 | 10,124 | |
| September 23 | Lafayette* | Franklin Field; Philadelphia, PA | W 45–28 | 5,427 | |
| September 30 | Dartmouth | Franklin Field; Philadelphia, PA | W 48–14 | 6,545 | |
| October 7 | at Holy Cross* | Fitton Field; Worcester, MA | L 17–34 | 10,026 | |
| October 14 | Columbia | Franklin Field; Philadelphia, PA | W 43–25 | 6,173 | |
| October 21 | at Yale | Yale Bowl; New Haven, CT | L 24–27 | 35,050 | |
| October 28 | Brown | Franklin Field; Philadelphia, PA | W 41-38 | 13,208 | |
| November 4 | at Princeton | Princeton Stadium; Princeton, NJ (rivalry) | W 40–24 | 20,311 | |
| November 11 | Harvard | Franklin Field; Philadelphia, PA (rivalry) | W 36–35 | 18,715 | |
| November 18 | Cornell | Schoellkopf Field; Ithaca, NY (rivalry) | W 45–15 | 9,014 | |
*Non-conference game

== Roster ==
2000 Penn Quakers football team roster
Players
Coaches
Offense

| Pos. | # | Name | Class |
|---|---|---|---|
| OL | 75 | Jeff Hatch | Sr |
| QB | 2 | Gavin Hoffman | Jr |
| WR | 7 | John Holahan | Sr |
| WR | 10 | Doug O'Neill | Sr |
| RB | 22 | Mike Verille | Sr |

Defense

| Pos. | # | Name | Class |
|---|---|---|---|
| DE | 83 | Chris Pennington | So |

Special teams

| Pos. | # | Name | Class |

Head coach

- Al Bagnoli

Coordinators/assistant coaches

Legend

- (C) Team captain
- (S) Suspended
- (I) Ineligible
- Injured
- Redshirt

Roster
Last update: November 21, 2000
