= 2000 Fordham Rams football team =

American college football season

2000 Fordham Rams football
- Conference: Patriot League
- Record: 3–8 (1–5 Patriot)
- Head coach: Dave Clawson (2nd season)
- Offensive coordinator: Ed Foley (2nd season)
- Defensive coordinator: Dave Cohen (2nd season)
- Captain: Ray Reddin
- Home stadium: Coffey Field

2000 Patriot League football standings
	Conf.			Overall
Team	W		L	W		L
No. 8 Lehigh $^	6	–	0	12	–	1
Colgate	4	–	2	7	–	4
Holy Cross	4	–	2	7	–	4
Towson	3	–	3	7	–	4
Bucknell	2	–	4	6	–	5
Fordham	1	–	5	3	–	8
Lafayette	1	–	5	2	–	9
$ – Conference champion; ^ – NCAA Division I-AA playoff participant; Rankings from The Sports Network poll

The 2000 Fordham Rams football team was an American football team that represented Fordham University during the 2000 NCAA Division I-AA football season. Fordham tied for last place in the Patriot League.

In their second year under head coach Dave Clawson, the Rams compiled a 3–8 record. Ray Reddin was the team captain.

The Rams were outscored 318 to 211. Their 1–5 conference record placed them in a tie for sixth in the seven-team Patriot League standings.

Fordham played its home games at Jack Coffey Field on the university's Rose Hill campus in The Bronx, in New York City.

== Schedule ==
Date	Opponent	Site	Result	Attendance	Source
September 2	Towson	Coffey Field; Bronx, NY	L 13–36	3,792	
September 9	Fairfield*	Coffey Field; Bronx, NY	W 34–7		
September 16	at Columbia*	Wien Stadium; New York, NY (rivalry)	L 26–43	5,007	
September 23	at Colgate	Andy Kerr Stadium; Hamilton, NY	L 6–21	4,012	
September 30	at Georgetown*	Kehoe Field; Washington, DC	W 17–10	2,361	
October 7	Brown*	Coffey Field; Bronx, NY	L 17–44	4,769	
October 14	Yale^{†}*	Coffey Field; Bronx, NY	L 17–24	5,837	
October 28	at Bucknell	Christy Mathewson–Memorial Stadium; Lewisburg, PA	L 13–27	5,128	
November 4	Lafayette	Coffey Field; Bronx, NY	W 31–28	3,138	
November 11	at No. 8 Lehigh	Goodman Stadium; Bethlehem, PA	L 17–51	8,675	
November 18	at Holy Cross	Fitton Field; Worcester, MA (rivalry)	L 20–27	9,147	
*Non-conference game; ^{†}Homecoming; Rankings from The Sports Network Poll released prior to the game
