= Rick Fox (American football) =

American football coach

Playing career
- 1983–1986: Wheaton (IL)

Coaching career (HC unless noted)
- 1986: Wheaton (IL) (GA)
- 1987–1992: Aurora (OL)
- 1992–1999: Wheaton (IL) (OL/ST)
- 1999–2007: Centre (OC)
- 2008–2013: Drake (OL/AHC)
- 2014–2018: Drake
- 2019–2020: Taylor (STC/DL)
- 2021–2025: Centre (OC)

Head coaching record
- Overall: 33–22

Rick Fox is an American college football coach. He most recently served as the offensive coordinator for Centre College, a position he held from 2021 to 2025. He was formerly a head coach for the Drake Bulldogs football team. He was named the head coach in December 2013, and coached his first game in 2014. He resigned from Drake on December 10, 2018.

== Head coaching record ==
Year	Team	Overall	Conference	Standing	Bowl/playoffs
Drake Bulldogs (Pioneer Football League) (2014–2018)
2014	Drake	7–4	6–2	T–3rd	
2015	Drake	5–6	4–4	T–4th	
2016	Drake	7–4	6–2	3rd	
2017	Drake	7–4	6–2	2nd	
2018	Drake	7–4	6–2	T–2nd	
Drake:		33–22	28–12		
Total:		33–22			
