= 2014 Valparaiso Crusaders football team =

American college football season

2014 Valparaiso Crusaders football
- Conference: Pioneer Football League
- Record: 4–8 (2–6 PFL)
- Head coach: Dave Cecchini (1st season)
- Offensive coordinator: Jason Miran (1st season)
- Defensive coordinator: Ernest Moore (1st season)
- Home stadium: Brown Field

2014 Pioneer Football League standings
	Conf.			Overall
Team	W		L	W		L
San Diego $^	7	–	1	9	–	3
Jacksonville *	7	–	1	9	–	2
Dayton	6	–	2	8	–	3
Drake	6	–	2	7	–	4
Campbell	4	–	4	5	–	7
Marist	4	–	4	4	–	7
Stetson	3	–	5	5	–	7
Morehead State	3	–	5	4	–	8
Butler	2	–	6	4	–	7
Valparaiso	2	–	6	4	–	8
Davidson	0	–	8	1	–	11
$ – Conference champion; ^ – FCS playoff participant; *Jacksonville ineligible for PFL title and FCS playoffs due to matters regarding the PFL's financial aid rules

The 2014 Valparaiso Crusaders football team represented Valparaiso University in the 2014 NCAA Division I FCS football season. They were led by first-year head coach Dave Cecchini and played their home games at Brown Field. They were a member of the Pioneer Football League. They finished the season 4–8, 2–6 in PFL play to finish in a tie for 9th place.

== Schedule ==
Date	Time	Opponent	Site	TV	Result	Attendance
August 28	7:00 pm	at Western Illinois*	Hanson Field; Macomb, IL	ESPN3	L 6–45	3,584
September 6	7:00 pm	Saint Joseph's (IN)*	Brown Field; Valparaiso, IN		L 10–31	3,212
September 20	1:00 pm	at William Jewell*	Greene Stadium; Liberty, MO		W 39–30	592
September 27	12:00 pm	at Campbell	Barker–Lane Stadium; Buies Creek, NC		L 24–34	6,370
October 4	12:00 pm	Marist	Brown Field; Valparaiso, IN		L 7–35	1,512
October 11	1:00 pm	Missouri Baptist*^{†}	Brown Field; Valparaiso, IN		W 55–7	4,771
October 18	1:00 pm	Drake	Brown Field; Valparaiso, IN		L 9–17	1,947
October 25	12:00 pm	at Morehead State	Jayne Stadium; Morehead, KY		L 47–48	3,583
November 1	12:00 pm	at Dayton	Welcome Stadium; Dayton, OH		L 19–42	1,866
November 8	1:00 pm	Butler	Brown Field; Valparaiso, IN (Hoosier Helmet Trophy)		W 17–3	1,867
November 15	3:00 pm	at San Diego	Torero Stadium; San Diego, CA		L 27–32	1,480
November 22	1:00 pm	Davidson	Brown Field; Valparaiso, IN		W 27–13	922
*Non-conference game; ^{†}Homecoming; All times are in Eastern time

- Source: Schedule
