= 2000 Columbia Lions football team =

American college football season

2000 Columbia Lions football
- Conference: Ivy League
- Record: 3–7 (1–6 Ivy)
- Head coach: Ray Tellier (12th season)
- Captains: Avery Moseley; Jason Pease
- Home stadium: Wien Stadium

2000 Ivy League football standings
	Conf.			Overall
Team	W		L	W		L
Penn $	6	–	1	7	–	3
Cornell	5	–	2	5	–	5
Yale	4	–	3	7	–	3
Harvard	4	–	3	5	–	5
Princeton	3	–	4	3	–	7
Columbia	1	–	6	3	–	7
Dartmouth	1	–	6	2	–	8
Brown *	4	–	3	7	–	3
$ – Conference champion; * Ineligible for conference championship

The 2000 Columbia Lions football team was an American football team that represented Columbia University during the 2000 NCAA Division I-AA football season. Columbia tied for second-to-last in the Ivy League.

In their 12th season under head coach Ray Tellier, the Lions compiled a 3–7 record and were outscored 302 to 256. Jason Pease and Avery Moseley were the team captains.

The Lions' 1–6 conference record tied for worst in the Ivy League standings, though both they and Dartmouth are shown as tied for sixth, as 4–3 Brown was excluded from the championship and recorded as finishing last. Columbia was outscored 246 to 156 by Ivy opponents.

Columbia played its homes games at Lawrence A. Wien Stadium in Upper Manhattan, in New York City.

== Schedule ==
Date	Opponent	Site	Result	Attendance	Source
September 16	Fordham*	Wien Stadium; New York, NY (rivalry)	W 43–22	5,007	
September 23	at Bucknell*	Christy Mathewson–Memorial Stadium; Lewisburg, PA	L 10–12	6,119	
September 30	Princeton	Wien Stadium; New York, NY	L 24–27 ^{OT}	4,125	
October 7	Lafayette*	Wien Stadium; New York, NY	W 47–22	2,739	
October 14	at Penn	Franklin Field; Philadelphia, PA	L 25–43	6,173	
October 21	Dartmouth^{†}	Wien Stadium; New York, NY	W 49–21	9,289	
October 28	at Yale	Yale Bowl; New Haven, CT	L 0–41	17,578	
November 4	at Harvard	Harvard Stadium; Boston, MA	L 0–34	6,721	
November 11	Cornell	Wien Stadium; New York, NY (rivalry)	L 31–35	9,102	
November 18	at Brown	Brown Stadium; Providence, RI	L 27–45	3,194	
*Non-conference game; ^{†}Homecoming
