= 2000 Princeton Tigers football team =

American college football season

2000 Princeton Tigers football
- Conference: Ivy League
- Record: 3–7 (3–4 Ivy)
- Head coach: Roger Hughes (1st season)
- Captain: Michael F. Higgins
- Home stadium: Princeton Stadium

2000 Ivy League football standings
	Conf.			Overall
Team	W		L	W		L
Penn $	6	–	1	7	–	3
Cornell	5	–	2	5	–	5
Yale	4	–	3	7	–	3
Harvard	4	–	3	5	–	5
Princeton	3	–	4	3	–	7
Columbia	1	–	6	3	–	7
Dartmouth	1	–	6	2	–	8
Brown *	4	–	3	7	–	3
$ – Conference champion; * Ineligible for conference championship

The 2000 Princeton Tigers football team represented Princeton University in the 2000 NCAA Division I-AA football season. In their first year under head coach Roger Hughes, the team compiled a 3–7 record (3–4 against Ivy League opponents) and finished in fifth place in the Ivy League. The team played its home games at Princeton Stadium in Princeton, New Jersey.

The John P. Poe - Richard W. Kazmaier, Jr. Football Trophy, given annually to "a member of the Princeton football team of good moral character, who, during the season in addition to proving himself a player of ability, has best exemplified [specified] traits and characteristics," was awarded to seniors Michael F. Higgins and Dennis M. Norman. Higgins was also the 2000 team captain.

== Schedule ==
Date	Time	Opponent	Site	Result	Attendance	Source
September 16	1:30 p.m.	at Lafayette*	Fisher Field; Easton, PA	L 17–24	8,013	
September 23	7:00 p.m.	Lehigh*	Princeton Stadium; Princeton, NJ	L 18–20	14,306	
September 30	1:30 p.m.	at Columbia	Wien Stadium; New York, NY	W 27–24 ^{OT}	4,125	
October 7	1:00 p.m.	at Colgate*	Andy Kerr Stadium; Hamilton, NY	L 6–34	4,019	
October 14	1:00 p.m.	Brown	Princeton Stadium; Princeton, NJ	W 55–28	18,113	
October 21	1:00 p.m.	Harvard	Princeton Stadium; Princeton, NJ (rivalry)	L 21–35	21,113	
October 28	1:00 p.m.	at Cornell	Schoellkopf Field; Ithaca, NY	L 24–25	4,952	
November 4	1:00 p.m.	Penn	Princeton Stadium; Princeton, NJ (rivalry)	L 24–40	20,311	
November 11	12:30 p.m.	at Yale	Yale Bowl; New Haven, CT (rivalry)	W 19–14	19,671	
November 18	1:00 p.m.	Dartmouth	Princeton Stadium; Princeton, NJ	L 37–43	18,667	
*Non-conference game; All times are in Eastern time

== Game summaries ==
=== Lafayette ===
Princeton at Lafayette

Team	1	2	3	4	Total
Princeton	0	0	0	17	17
• Lafayette	0	0	0	24	24

- Date: September 16
- Location: Fisher Field
  Easton, PA
- Game start: 1:30 P.M. CDT

On September 16, 2000, Princeton opened its season in its first game under head coach Roger Hughes. The Tigers lost to Lafayette, 24-17. The game was tied at 17 with nine seconds left, and Lafayette faced second down at the Princeton one-yard line. Lafayette went for the touchdown and scored for the win.

=== Lehigh ===
On September 23, 2000, Princeton lost to #19 Lehigh, 20-18, at Princeton Stadium. Lehigh scored 20 points in the first half and was held scoreless in the second half as the Tigers mounted a comeback effort. The effort fell short, as Princeton was unable to score a touchdown and settled for six Taylor Northrop field goals, including a 50-yarder. After the game, head coach Roger Hughes said, "I don't believe in moral victories, although, I'm very proud of how our kids played. Our kids played every snap of every quarter. I told them afterwards in the locker room that they have nothing to hang their heads about. [I told them] 'You became men today.'"

=== Columbia ===
On September 30, 2000, Princeton defeated Columbia, 27-24, with a field goal in overtime. The game was the Ivy League opener for both teams.

=== Colgate ===
On October 7, 2000, Princeton lost to Colgate, 34-6. Princeton's Kyle Brandt rushed for 80 yards on 11 carries.

=== Brown ===
On October 14, 2000, Princeton defeated Brown, 55-28, in front of a crowd of 18,113 spectators. David Splithoff became the first freshman to start at quarterback in Princeton football history. In his first start, Splithoff completed 13 of 17 passes for 289 yards and three touchdowns and led the Tigers to 514 yards of offense and 55 points.

=== Harvard ===
On October 21, 2000, Princeton lost to Harvard, 35-21, at Princeton Stadium. Harvard outgained Princeton 492 total yards to 294. Princeton was also charged with 12 penalties. The loss to Harvard was the fifth in a row, representing Princeton's longest losing streak in the long history of the Harvard–Princeton football rivalry.

=== Cornell ===
On October 28, 2000, Princeton lost a close game to Cornell, 25-24. Princeton scored a potential tying touchdown late with 11 seconds remaining, but kicker Taylor Northrop slipped on wet turf and missed the kick for point after touchdown.

=== Penn ===
On November 4, 2000, Princeton took an early lead, but Penn then scored 34 unanswered points and defeated the Tigers, 40-24.

=== Yale ===
On November 11, 2000, Princeton defeated Yale, 19-14. Yale took a 14-3 lead at halftime, but Princeton scored 16 unanswered points in the second half. With 16 second remaining, Princeton scored the winning touchdown on a 32-yard pass from quarterback Jon Blevins to wide receiver Chisom Opara.

=== Dartmouth ===
On November 18, 2000, Princeton ended its season with a 42-37 loss against Dartmouth. Dartmouth quarterback Greg Smith completed 20 of 27 passes for 308 yards and four touchdowns. After the game, head coach Roger Hughes said the following about his team's seniors: "While I'm very saddened by losing them, I'm also excited about the future in that these seniors have given us a great foundation to build on."

== Players ==
The following players won varsity letters for their participation in the 2000 Princeton football team:

- Cameron T. Atkinson ’03
- Gary N. Baumwoll ’02
- Jonathan W. Blevins ’01
- Kyle R. Brandt ’01
- Andrew V. Bryant ’03
- David B Camarillo ’01
- Martin K. Cheatham ’01
- Djordje D. Citovic ’01
- Robert G. Currey ’03
- Ismael H. El-Amin ’03
- Robert E. Farrell ’02
- Andrew D. Frank ’01
- Nicholas A. Freitag ’01
- Jonathan F. Ganter ’02
- Michael F. Higgins ’01
- Phillip E. Jackman ’02
- Zakary A. Keasey ’04
- Timothy A. Kirby ’04
- Kevin A. Kongslie ’03
- Steven G. Koopman ’01
- Michael W. Long ’02
- Timothy J. Ligue ’01
- Jonathan E. Luick ’01
- Blair W. Morrison ’04
- Brandon P. Mueller ’04
- Dennis M. Norman ’01
- Taylor B. Northrop ’02
- Chisomaga N. Opara ’03
- John D. Owens ’01
- J. Matthew Peluse ’02
- C. Blake Perry ’04
- Stephen P. Pierce ’01
- Nathan P. Podsakoff ’01
- John V. Raveche ’01
- James A. Rogers ’03
- Christopher S. Roser-Jones ’02
- Jason M. Rotman ’01
- Patrick C. Schottel ’03
- Donald Scott ’03
- Paul B. Simbi ’03
- John M. Solic ’01
- Aron E. Tremble ’01
- Ross F. Tucker ’01
- C. Clark Webb ’03
- Joseph W. Weiss ’04
- Brian P. Wilson ’01
