= 2000 Dartmouth Big Green football team =

American college football season

2000 Dartmouth Big Green football
- Conference: Ivy League
- Record: 2–8 (1–6 Ivy)
- Head coach: John Lyons (9th season)
- Captains: Peter Chapman; Richard Joyce
- Home stadium: Memorial Field

2000 Ivy League football standings
	Conf.			Overall
Team	W		L	W		L
Penn $	6	–	1	7	–	3
Cornell	5	–	2	5	–	5
Yale	4	–	3	7	–	3
Harvard	4	–	3	5	–	5
Princeton	3	–	4	3	–	7
Columbia	1	–	6	3	–	7
Dartmouth	1	–	6	2	–	8
Brown *	4	–	3	7	–	3
$ – Conference champion; * Ineligible for conference championship

The 2000 Dartmouth Big Green football team was an American football team that represented Dartmouth College during the 2000 NCAA Division I-AA football season. The Big Green tied for second-to-last in the Ivy League.

In its ninth season under head coach John Lyons, the team compiled a 2–8 record and was outscored 388 to 231. Peter Chapman and Richard Joyce were the team captains.

The Big Green's 1–6 conference record tied for worst in the Ivy League standings, though both they and Columbia are considered to have tied for sixth, as 4–3 Brown was excluded from the championship and recorded as finishing last. Dartmouth was outscored 290 to 155 by Ivy opponents.

Dartmouth played its home games at Memorial Field on the college campus in Hanover, New Hampshire.

== Schedule ==
Date	Opponent	Site	Result	Attendance	Source
September 16	Colgate*	Memorial Field; Hanover, NH	L 24–42	4,916	
September 23	at No. 25 New Hampshire*	Cowell Stadium; Durham, NH (rivalry)	L 21–42	5,157	
September 30	at Penn	Franklin Field; Philadelphia, PA	L 14–48	6,545	
October 7	Yale	Memorial Field; Hanover, NH	L 14–24	7,107	
October 14	Holy Cross*	Memorial Field; Hanover, NH	W 31–14	5,014	
October 21	at Columbia	Wien Stadium; New York, NY	L 21–49	9,289	
October 28	Harvard^{†}	Memorial Field; Hanover, NH (rivalry)	L 7–49	8,028	
November 4	at Cornell	Schoellkopf Field; Ithaca, NY (rivalry)	L 31–49	4,518	
November 11	Brown	Memorial Field; Hanover, NH	L 26–34		
November 18	at Princeton	Princeton Stadium; Princeton, NJ	W 42–37	18,667	
*Non-conference game; ^{†}Homecoming; Rankings from The Sports Network Poll released prior to the game

== Roster ==
2000 Dartmouth Big Green football team roster
Players
Coaches
Offense

Pos.	#	Name	Class
QB	5	Brian Mann	So
WR	6	Matt Norton	Sr
QB	10	Greg Smith	Jr

Defense

Pos.	#	Name	Class

Special teams

Pos.	#	Name	Class

Head coach

- John Lyons

Coordinators/assistant coaches

Legend

- (C) Team captain
- (S) Suspended
- (I) Ineligible
- Injured
- Redshirt

Roster
