= 2014 Drake Bulldogs football team =

American college football season

2014 Drake Bulldogs football

PFL co-champion
- Conference: Pioneer Football League
- Record: 7–4 (6–2 PFL)
- Head coach: Rick Fox (1st season)
- Defensive coordinator: Todd Stepsis (1st season)
- Home stadium: Drake Stadium

2014 Pioneer Football League standings
	Conf.			Overall
Team	W		L	W		L
San Diego $^	7	–	1	9	–	3
Jacksonville *	7	–	1	9	–	2
Dayton	6	–	2	8	–	3
Drake	6	–	2	7	–	4
Campbell	4	–	4	5	–	7
Marist	4	–	4	4	–	7
Stetson	3	–	5	5	–	7
Morehead State	3	–	5	4	–	8
Butler	2	–	6	4	–	7
Valparaiso	2	–	6	4	–	8
Davidson	0	–	8	1	–	11
$ – Conference champion; ^ – FCS playoff participant; *Jacksonville ineligible for PFL title and FCS playoffs due to matters regarding the PFL's financial aid rules

The 2014 Drake Bulldogs football team represented Drake University as a member of the Pioneer Football League (PFL) during 2014 NCAA Division I FCS football season. Led by first-year head coach Rick Fox, the Bulldogs compiled an overall record of 7–4 with a mark of 6–2 in conference play, tying for third place in the PFL. The team played its home games at Drake Stadium in Des Moines, Iowa.

On December 11, 2013, Fox was named the 26th head football coach in Drake history.

== Schedule ==
Date	Time	Opponent	Site	Result	Attendance
August 30	6:00 pm	Grand View*	Drake Stadium; Des Moines, IA	L 22–45	7,248
September 6	6:00 pm	Truman State*	Drake Stadium; Des Moines, IA	W 13–7 ^{OT}	3,078
September 13	3:00 pm	at Western Illinois*	Hanson Field; Macomb, IL	L 13–38	9,445
September 20	1:00 pm	Marist	Drake Stadium; Des Moines, IA	W 21–6	3,354
October 4	12:00 pm	at Jacksonville	D. B. Milne Field; Jacksonville, FL	L 14–29	3,748
October 11	1:00 pm	Davidson	Drake Stadium; Des Moines, IA	W 51–14	2,397
October 18	1:00 pm	at Valparaiso	Brown Field; Valparaiso, IN	W 17–9	1,947
October 25	1:00 pm	Butler^{†}	Drake Stadium; Des Moines, IA	W 21–19	2,914
November 1	12:30 pm	San Diego	Drake Stadium; Des Moines, IA	L 14–17	1,909
November 8	12:00 pm	at Dayton	Welcome Stadium; Dayton, OH (rivalry)	W 34–30	2,485
November 22	12:00 pm	at Stetson	Spec Martin Stadium; DeLand, FL	W 27–15	2,900
*Non-conference game; ^{†}Homecoming; All times are in Central time
