= 2000 Harvard Crimson football team =

American college football season

2000 Harvard Crimson football
- Conference: Ivy League
- Record: 5–5 (4–3 Ivy)
- Head coach: Tim Murphy (7th season)
- Offensive coordinator: Jay Mills (5th season)
- Offensive scheme: Multiple pro-style
- Captain: Mike Clare
- Home stadium: Harvard Stadium

2000 Ivy League football standings
	Conf.			Overall
Team	W		L	W		L
Penn $	6	–	1	7	–	3
Cornell	5	–	2	5	–	5
Yale	4	–	3	7	–	3
Harvard	4	–	3	5	–	5
Princeton	3	–	4	3	–	7
Columbia	1	–	6	3	–	7
Dartmouth	1	–	6	2	–	8
Brown *	4	–	3	7	–	3
$ – Conference champion; * Ineligible for conference championship

The 2000 Harvard Crimson football team represented Harvard University in the 2000 NCAA Division I-AA football season. In their seventh year under head coach Timothy Murphy, the Crimson finished the season with an overall record of 5–5, placing in a tie for third among Ivy league teams with a conference mark of 4–3. Mike Clare was the team captain.

Harvard played its home games at Harvard Stadium in the Allston neighborhood of Boston, Massachusetts.

== Schedule ==
Date	Opponent	Site	Result	Attendance	Source
September 16	Holy Cross*	Harvard Stadium; Boston, MA	L 25–27	7,406	
September 23	at Brown	Brown Stadium; Providence, RI	W 42–37	9,052	
September 30	at Lafayette*	Fisher Field; Easton, PA	W 42–19	4,728	
October 7	Cornell	Harvard Stadium; Boston, MA	L 28–29		
October 14	No. 15 Lehigh*	Harvard Stadium; Boston, MA	L 13–45	6,265	
October 21	at Princeton	Princeton Stadium; Princeton, NJ (rivalry)	W 35–21	21,113	
October 28	at Dartmouth	Memorial Field; Hanover, NH (rivalry)	W 49–7	8,028	
November 4	Columbia	Harvard Stadium; Boston, MA	W 34–0	6,721	
November 11	at Penn	Franklin Field; Philadelphia, PA (rivalry)	L 35–36	18,715	
November 18	Yale	Harvard Stadium; Boston, MA (The Game)	L 24–34	30,898	
*Non-conference game; Rankings from The Sports Network Poll released prior to the game
