= 2000 Georgetown Hoyas football team =

American college football season

2000 Georgetown Hoyas football
- Conference: Metro Atlantic Athletic Conference
- Record: 5–6 (3–2 MAAC)
- Head coach: Bob Benson (8th season)
- Captains: Brett Crowder; Gharun Hester; Ryan O'Donoghue; Reid Wakefield
- Home stadium: Kehoe Field

2000 Metro Atlantic Athletic Conference football standings
	Conf.			Overall
Team	W		L	W		L
Duquesne $	8	–	0	10	–	1
Fairfield	7	–	1	8	–	2
Marist	5	–	3	6	–	4
Georgetown	3	–	2	5	–	6
La Salle	4	–	3	7	–	4
Iona	3	–	5	4	–	7
Saint Peter's	2	–	6	4	–	7
Siena	1	–	6	1	–	9
Canisius	0	–	7	0	–	10
$ – Conference champion

The 2000 Georgetown Hoyas football team represented Georgetown University as a member of the Metro Atlantic Athletic Conference (MAAC) during the 2000 NCAA Division I-AA football season. Led by eighth-year head coach Bob Benson, the Hoyas compiled an overall record of 5–6 with a mark of 3–2 in conference play, placing fourth in the MAAC. Brett Crowder, Gharun Hester, Ryan O'Donoghue and Reid Wakefield were the team captains. Georgetown played its home games at Kehoe Field, on the university campus in Washington, D.C.

This was the final season in which the Georgetown competed in the MAAC. In January 2000, the university president announced that the Hoyas would switch their affiliation to the Patriot League in 2001.

== Schedule ==
Date	Opponent	Site	Result	Attendance	Source
September 9	Holy Cross*	Kehoe Field; Washington, DC	L 22–38	2,789	
September 16	at Wagner*	Wagner College Stadium; Staten Island, NY	W 28–21	1,486	
September 23	Butler*	Kehoe Field; Washington, DC	W 57–56 ^{OT}		
September 30	Fordham	Kehoe Field; Washington, DC	L 10–17	2,361	
October 7	Bucknell*	Kehoe Field; Washington, DC	L 10–24	1,302	
October 14	at Duquesne	Rooney Field; Pittsburgh, PA	L 20–44	4,914	
October 21	Marist	Kehoe Field; Washington, DC	W 41–17		
October 28	at Fairfield	Alumni Stadium; Fairfield, CT	L 14–38	3,357	
November 4	Iona	Kehoe Field; Washington, DC	W 43–14	2,236	
November 11	Saint Peter's	Kehoe Field; Washington, DC	W 20–16	889	
November 30	at Davidson*	Richardson Stadium; Davidson, NC	L 17–41	4,200	
*Non-conference game
