= 2000 Brown Bears football team =

American college football season

2000 Brown Bears football
- Conference: Ivy League
- Record: 7–3 (4–3 Ivy)
- Head coach: Phil Estes (3rd season)
- Offensive scheme: Pro-style
- Defensive coordinator: David Duggan (3rd season)
- Base defense: 4–3
- Captains: Gordon Chen; N. Finneran; Drew Inzer
- Home stadium: Brown Stadium

2000 Ivy League football standings
	Conf.			Overall
Team	W		L	W		L
Penn $	6	–	1	7	–	3
Cornell	5	–	2	5	–	5
Yale	4	–	3	7	–	3
Harvard	4	–	3	5	–	5
Princeton	3	–	4	3	–	7
Columbia	1	–	6	3	–	7
Dartmouth	1	–	6	2	–	8
Brown *	4	–	3	7	–	3
$ – Conference champion; * Ineligible for conference championship

The 2000 Brown Bears football team was an American football team that represented Brown University during the 2000 NCAA Division I-AA football season. Brown was declared ineligible for the Ivy League championship, though its league record would have placed it in a tie for third.

In their third season under head coach Phil Estes, the Bears compiled a 7–3 record and outscored opponents 375 to 301. Gordon Chen, N. Finneran and Drew Inzer were the team captains.

Before the season began, the Council of Ivy Group Presidents voted to exclude Brown from the football championship for one year in response to a report that Brown basketball, football, soccer and volleyball coaches had connected prospective student-athletes with offers of private financial assistance. The NCAA ruled that the students implicated in the report were not at fault and would retain their eligibility, but the Ivy League, with its stricter rules about financial aid, chose a harsher penalty to send a message to Brown and other member schools that recruiting violations would not be tolerated. Football and the other three Brown teams were also hit with tighter restrictions on recruiting activities for 2001 and 2002.

The Bears' 4–3 conference record in 2000 would have tied for third in the Ivy League standings, but because the team was declared ineligible, the league's record book lists it as the last-place team. Brown outscored Ivy opponents 266 to 245.

Brown played its home games at Brown Stadium in Providence, Rhode Island.

== Schedule ==
Date	Opponent	Site	Result	Attendance	Source
September 16	San Diego*	Brown Stadium; Providence, RI	W 36–20	3,639	
September 23	Harvard^{†}	Brown Stadium; Providence, RI	L 37–42	9,052	
September 30	Rhode Island*	Brown Stadium; Providence, RI (rivalry)	W 29–19	4,173	
October 7	at Fordham*	Coffey Field; Bronx, NY	W 44–17	4,769	
October 14	at Princeton	Princeton Stadium; Princeton, NJ	L 28–55	18,113	
October 21	Cornell	Brown Stadium; Providence, RI	W 56–40	15,126	
October 28	at Penn	Franklin Field; Philadelphia, PA	L 38–41	13,208	
November 4	Yale	Brown Stadium; Providence, RI	W 28–14	7,873	
November 11	at Dartmouth	Memorial Field; Hanover, NH	W 34–26		
November 18	Columbia	Brown Stadium; Providence, RI	W 45–27	3,194	
*Non-conference game; ^{†}Homecoming
