= 2014 Stetson Hatters football team =

American college football season

2014 Stetson Hatters football
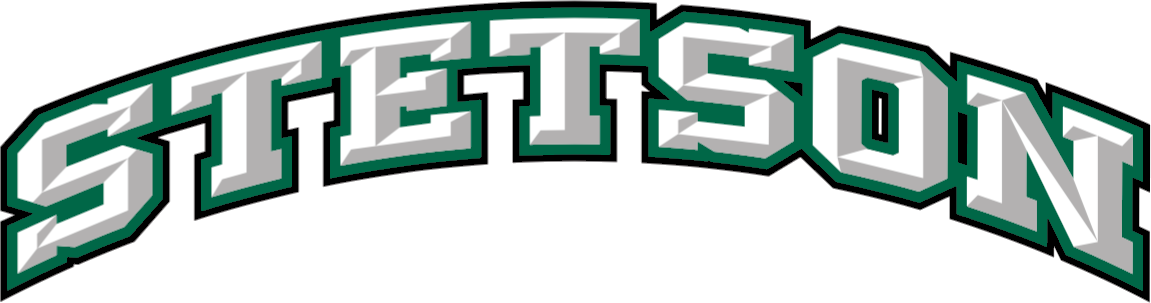
- Conference: Pioneer Football League
- Record: 5–7 (3–5 PFL)
- Head coach: Roger Hughes (2nd season)
- Defensive coordinator: Brian Young (2nd season)
- Home stadium: Spec Martin Stadium

2014 Pioneer Football League standings
	Conf.			Overall
Team	W		L	W		L
San Diego $^	7	–	1	9	–	3
Jacksonville *	7	–	1	9	–	2
Dayton	6	–	2	8	–	3
Drake	6	–	2	7	–	4
Campbell	4	–	4	5	–	7
Marist	4	–	4	4	–	7
Stetson	3	–	5	5	–	7
Morehead State	3	–	5	4	–	8
Butler	2	–	6	4	–	7
Valparaiso	2	–	6	4	–	8
Davidson	0	–	8	1	–	11
$ – Conference champion; ^ – FCS playoff participant; *Jacksonville ineligible for PFL title and FCS playoffs due to matters regarding the PFL's financial aid rules

The 2014 Stetson Hatters football team represented Stetson University as a member of the Pioneer Football League (PFL) during the 2014 NCAA Division I FCS football season. Led by second-year head coach Roger Hughes, the Hatters compiled an overall record of 5–7 with a mark of 3–5 in conference play, tying for seventh place in the PFL. Stetson played home games at Spec Martin Stadium on DeLand, Florida.

== Schedule ==
Date	Time	Opponent	Site	TV	Result	Attendance
August 30	7:00 pm	at Warner*	Jahna Field; Lake Wales, FL		W 35–16	1,213
September 7	7:00 pm	Florida Tech*	Spec Martin Stadium; DeLand, FL		L 12–54	3,900
September 13	6:00 pm	Mercer*	Spec Martin Stadium; DeLand, FL		L 0–49	3,660
September 20	1:00 pm	at Birmingham–Southern*	Panther Stadium; Birmingham, AL		W 37–19	1,235
October 4	6:00 pm	Butler	Spec Martin Stadium; DeLand, FL	HV	L 41–49	3,912
October 11	5:00 pm	at San Diego	Torero Stadium; San Diego, CA		L 23–31	3,872
October 18	6:00 pm	Jacksonviile	Spec Martin Stadium; DeLand, FL	HV	L 7–30	3,641
October 25	1:00 pm	at Davidson	Richardson Stadium; Davidson, NC		W 40–34	3,614
November 1	1:00 pm	at Campbell	Barker–Lane Stadium; Buies Creek, NC		W 28–24	2,878
November 8	3:00 pm	Marist^{†}	Spec Martin Stadium; DeLand, FL	HV	W 22–14	4,265
November 15	1:00 pm	at Morehead State	Jayne Stadium; Morehead, KY		L 18–41	4,658
November 22	1:00 pm	Drake	Spec Martin Stadium; DeLand, FL	HV	L 15–27	2,900
*Non-conference game; ^{†}Homecoming; All times are in Eastern time

== Game summaries ==
=== At Warner ===
	1	2	3	4	Total
Hatters	7	25	3	0	35
Royals	10	0	6	0	16

=== Florida Tech ===
	1	2	3	4	Total
Panthers	30	7	10	7	54
Hatters	0	0	0	12	12

=== Mercer ===
	1	2	3	4	Total
Bears	21	14	14	0	49
Hatters	0	0	0	0	0

=== At Birmingham-Southern ===
	1	2	3	4	Total
Hatters	7	16	0	14	37
Panthers	6	13	0	0	19

=== Butler ===
	1	2	3	4	Total
Bulldogs	7	7	21	14	49
Hatters	7	13	8	13	41

=== At San Diego ===
	1	2	3	4	Total
Hatters	10	6	0	7	23
Toreros	7	7	3	14	31

=== At Jacksonville ===
	1	2	3	4	Total
Hatters	10	10	3	7	30
Dolphins	0	0	7	0	7

=== At Davidson ===
	1	2	3	4	Total
Hatters	14	6	13	7	40
Wildcats	3	21	7	3	34

=== At Campbell ===
	1	2	3	4	Total
Hatters	7	7	7	7	28
Fighting Camels	21	0	3	0	24

=== Marist ===
	1	2	3	4	Total
Red Foxes	7	7	0	0	14
Hatters	8	0	0	14	22

=== At Morehead State ===
	1	2	3	4	Total
Hatters	6	6	6	0	18
Eagles	6	14	14	7	41

=== Drake ===
	1	2	3	4	Total
Bulldogs	7	13	0	7	27
Hatters	8	0	7	0	15
