= 2000 Lafayette Leopards football team =

American college football season

2000 Lafayette Leopards football
- Conference: Patriot League
- Record: 2–9 (1–5 Patriot)
- Head coach: Frank Tavani (1st season)
- Offensive coordinator: Mike Faragalli (1st season)
- Defensive coordinator: John Loose (1st season)
- Captains: Mike Levy; Phil Yarberough
- Home stadium: Fisher Field

2000 Patriot League football standings
	Conf.			Overall
Team	W		L	W		L
No. 8 Lehigh $^	6	–	0	12	–	1
Colgate	4	–	2	7	–	4
Holy Cross	4	–	2	7	–	4
Towson	3	–	3	7	–	4
Bucknell	2	–	4	6	–	5
Fordham	1	–	5	3	–	8
Lafayette	1	–	5	2	–	9
$ – Conference champion; ^ – NCAA Division I-AA playoff participant; Rankings from The Sports Network poll

The 2000 Lafayette Leopards football team was an American football team that represented Lafayette College during the 2000 NCAA Division I-AA football season. The Leopards tied for last in the Patriot League.

In their first year under head coach Frank Tavani, the Leopards compiled a 2–9 record. Mike Levy and Phil Yarberough were the team captains.

The Leopards were outscored 350 to 244. Their 1–5 conference record tied for worst in the seven-team Patriot League standings.

Lafayette played its home games at Fisher Field on College Hill in Easton, Pennsylvania.

== Schedule ==
Date	Opponent	Site	Result	Attendance	Source
September 9	Towson	Fisher Field; Easton, PA	L 42–20	5,229	
September 16	Princeton*	Fisher Field; Easton, PA	W 24–17	8,013	
September 23	at Penn*	Franklin Field; Philadelphia, PA	L 45–28	5,427	
September 30	Harvard*	Fisher Field; Easton, PA	L 42–19	4,728	
October 7	at Columbia*	Wien Stadium; New York, NY	L 47–22	2,739	
October 14	at Bucknell	Christy Mathewson–Memorial Stadium; Lewisburg, PA	L 42–30		
October 21	Holy Cross^{†}	Fisher Field; Easton, PA	W 28–13	6,723	
October 28	at Colgate	Andy Kerr Stadium; Hamilton, NY	L 17–14	5,290	
November 4	at Fordham	Coffey Field; Bronx, NY	L 31–28	3,138	
November 11	at Duquesne*	Rooney Field; Pittsburgh, PA	L 23–14	4,703	
November 18	No. 8 Lehigh	Fisher Field; Easton, PA (The Rivalry)	L 31–17	12,586	
*Non-conference game; ^{†}Homecoming; Rankings from The Sports Network Poll released prior to the game
