= Tenney Stadium at Leonidoff Field =

Stadium in Poughkeepsie, New York

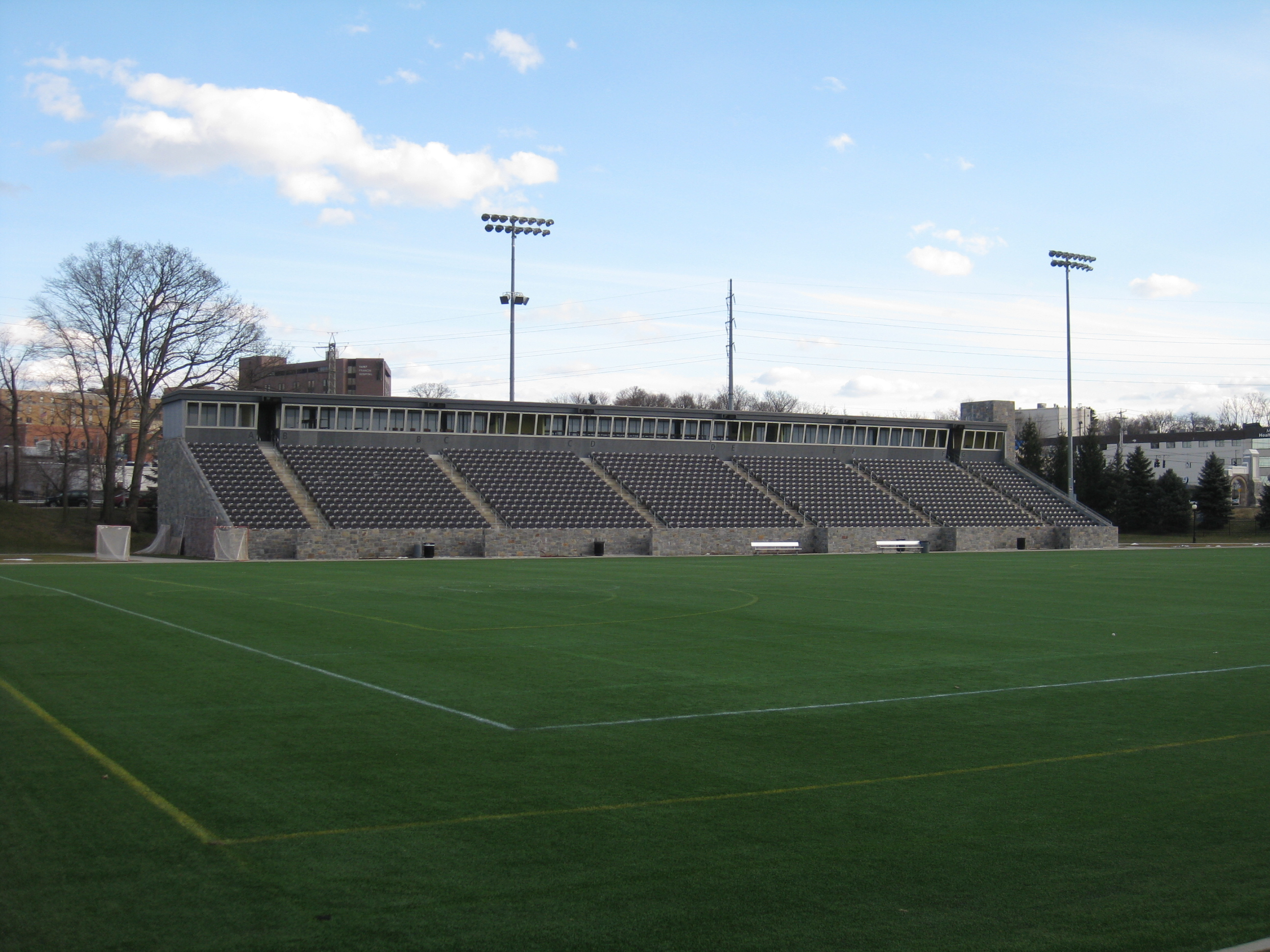
- Interactive map of Tenney Stadium at Leonidoff Field
- Full name: Tenney Stadium at Leonidoff Field
- Location: Poughkeepsie, New York, United States
- Coordinates: 41.718431°N 73.934°W
- Owner: Marist University
- Capacity: 5,000
- Executive suites: Yes
- Surface: Grass (1968–2006); Field Turf (2006–present)
- Scoreboard: Electronic
- Acreage: 3.50

Construction
- Groundbreaking: 1965
- Opened: 1968
- Renovated: 2006
- Architect: Skidmore, Owings & Merrill LLP

Tenants
- Marist Red Foxes football (2007–present); Kingston Stockade (NPSL) (2023)

Tenney Stadium at Leonidoff Field is a 5,000-seat multi-purpose stadium in Poughkeepsie, New York. It is home to the Marist University Red Foxes football team and Kingston Stockade FC of the National Premier Soccer League. The field was named after Alex Leonidoff, a local physician and avid Marist Athletics supporter. The facility opened in 1968. At the conclusion of the 2006 football season, the existing grandstand was removed to make way for a more modern, updated facility including modern press boxes, luxury suites, home and away locker rooms, an athletic training room as well as a new concession stand. On October 6, 2007 began with the dedication of Tenney Stadium at Leonidoff Field. The stadium's name honors Tim Tenney, CEO of Pepsi-Cola of the Hudson Valley, who provided the lead gift for the stadium renovation project. Additionally, the grass natural turf surface was replaced with Field Turf synthetic surface.

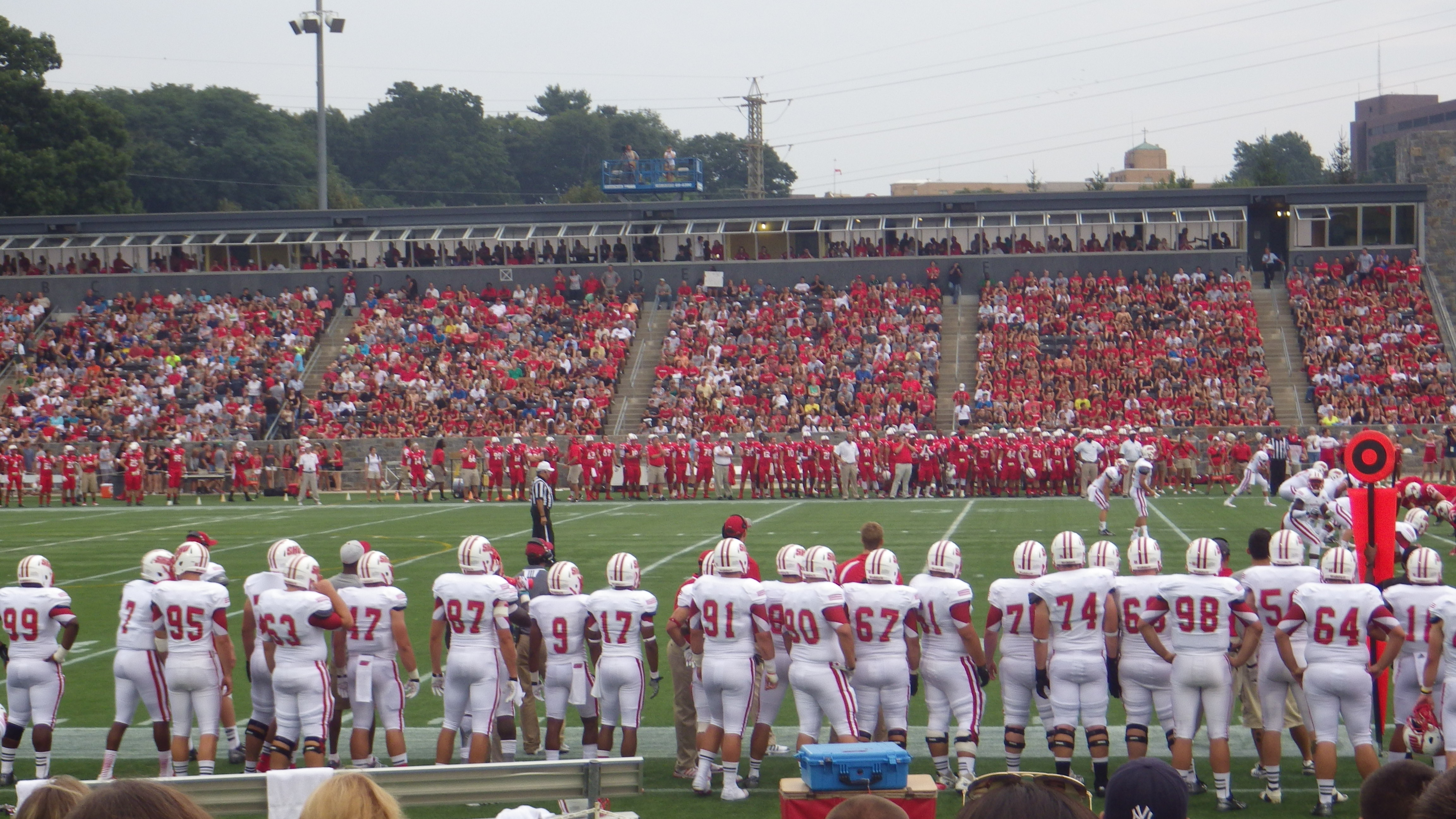
View of Tenney Stadium from the lawn seating during a football game

It has a capacity of 5,000 with amphitheater-style seating on the west side of the field for lawn chairs and blankets. The facility includes a stone-faced precast concrete grandstand. The ground level field house contains two large, day-lit varsity locker rooms with showers, a medical training room, an equipment room, and support spaces. A field storage room is provided with vehicular access. The building also includes a public concession stand and restrooms. Lockers and concession areas are highlighted on the façade by large wooden exterior alcoves that create bays for students and players.

The new grandstand features a large press box, served by elevators, that is equipped with a state-of-the-art sound system and wireless communications. VIP hospitality wings provide seating for 120 people with a fully operable window wall facing the field. Press box and VIP seats also provide views of the Hudson River and the Poughkeepsie Bridge beyond.

Objections were raised to the removal of approximately 20 trees in preparation for this project. The oldest of the trees was determined post-mortem to be 180 years old. It began life around the same time as the founder of the Marist Brothers, Saint Marcellin Champagnat, and was therefore in existence 80 years before the college was established. The objections abated after an e-mail was distributed by the administration stating that the planting of 40 new trees was included in the project plans.

Designed by Skidmore, Owings & Merrill LLP, the project was completed for the start of the 2007 football season. It now serves five varsity sports programs for the school.

On January 24, 2023, National Premier Soccer League team Kingston Stockade announced they would play their 2023 home schedule at Tenney Stadium due to ongoing renovations at their usual home, Dietz Stadium.

== See also ==
- List of NCAA Division I FCS football stadiums
