= De Decker =

De Decker is a Dutch occupational surname meaning "the thatcher". A variant spelling is De Dekker. In West Flanders the name is usually agglutinated to Dedecker. People with this name include:

De Decker / De Dekker

- Alfdan De Decker (born 1996), Belgian cyclist
- Armand De Decker (1948–2019), Belgian politician
- Ezechiel de Decker (1603/04–1646/47), Dutch surveyor and teacher of mathematics
- Jacob de Decker (1640–1680), Dutch painter active in Italy
- Jeremias de Dekker (c.1610–1666), Dutch poet
- Johannes de Decker (1626–aft.1670), Dutch landowner in New Netherland
- Mike De Decker (born 1995), Belgian darts player
- Pierre de Decker (1812–1891), Prime Minister of Belgium 1855–1857
- Tijl De Decker (2001–2023), Belgian cyclist
- Wim De Decker (born 1982), Belgian football player and manager
- Nicholas De Decker (born 1997), South African lawyer

DeDecker / Dedecker

- Jane DeDecker (born 1961), American sculptor
- Jean-Marie Dedecker (born 1952), Belgian politician, founder of List Dedecker
- Mary DeDecker (1909–2000), American botanist, plant collector
- Paul Dedecker (1921–2007), Belgian mathematician
- Peter Dedecker (born 1983), Belgian politician

== See also ==
- Den Dekker, Dutch surname of the same origin
- Decker (surname), surname of mostly Low German origin
- Dekker, common Dutch surname of the same origin
- Dedecker lupine, plant species named after plant collector Mary DeDecker
