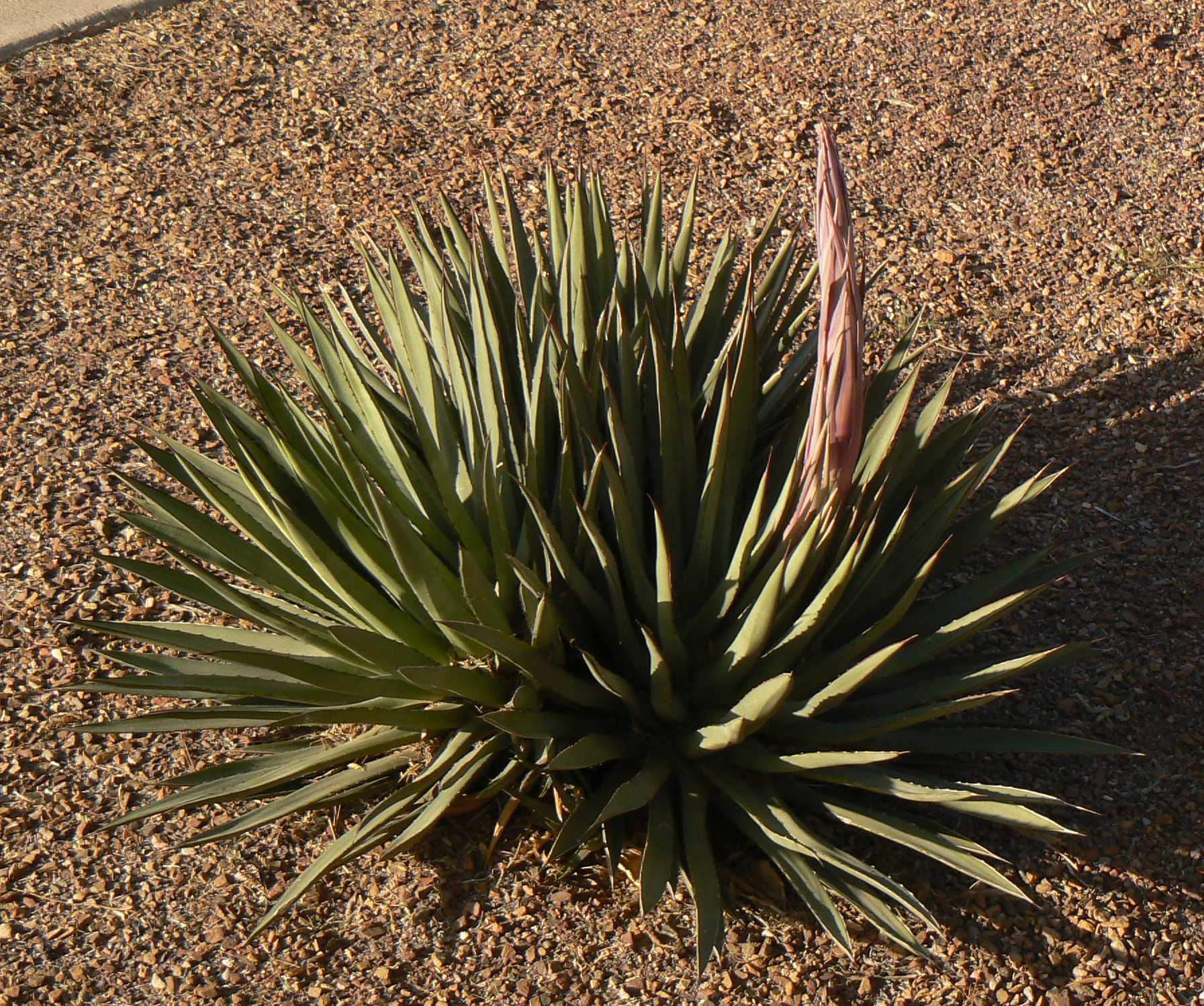
- Agave arizonica group of rosettes

Scientific classification
- Kingdom: Plantae
- Clade: Tracheophytes
- Clade: Angiosperms
- Clade: Monocots
- Order: Asparagales
- Family: Asparagaceae
- Subfamily: Agavoideae
- Genus: Agave
- Species: A. × arizonica

Binomial name
- Agave × arizonica Gentry & J.H.Weber

= Agave × arizonica =

Species of flowering plant

Agave × arizonica is a rare plant, endemic to Arizona. It is a hybrid between two species of Agave in the family Asparagaceae, A. chrysantha and A. toumeyana var. bella. It was discovered in the 1960s near a summit of the New River Mountains, near the Maricopa-Yavapai county line north of Phoenix, Arizona.

Agave × arizonica is a small plant about 30 cm high and 40 cm broad. Although similar to Agave utahensis, it has distinct differences in suckering more sparingly, in not forming a large dense clump, having leaves with a distinct dark brown margin and also more cylindrical flowers. Its flowers are yellow, with 10-20 per cluster, each up to 3.5 cm (1.4 in) long.

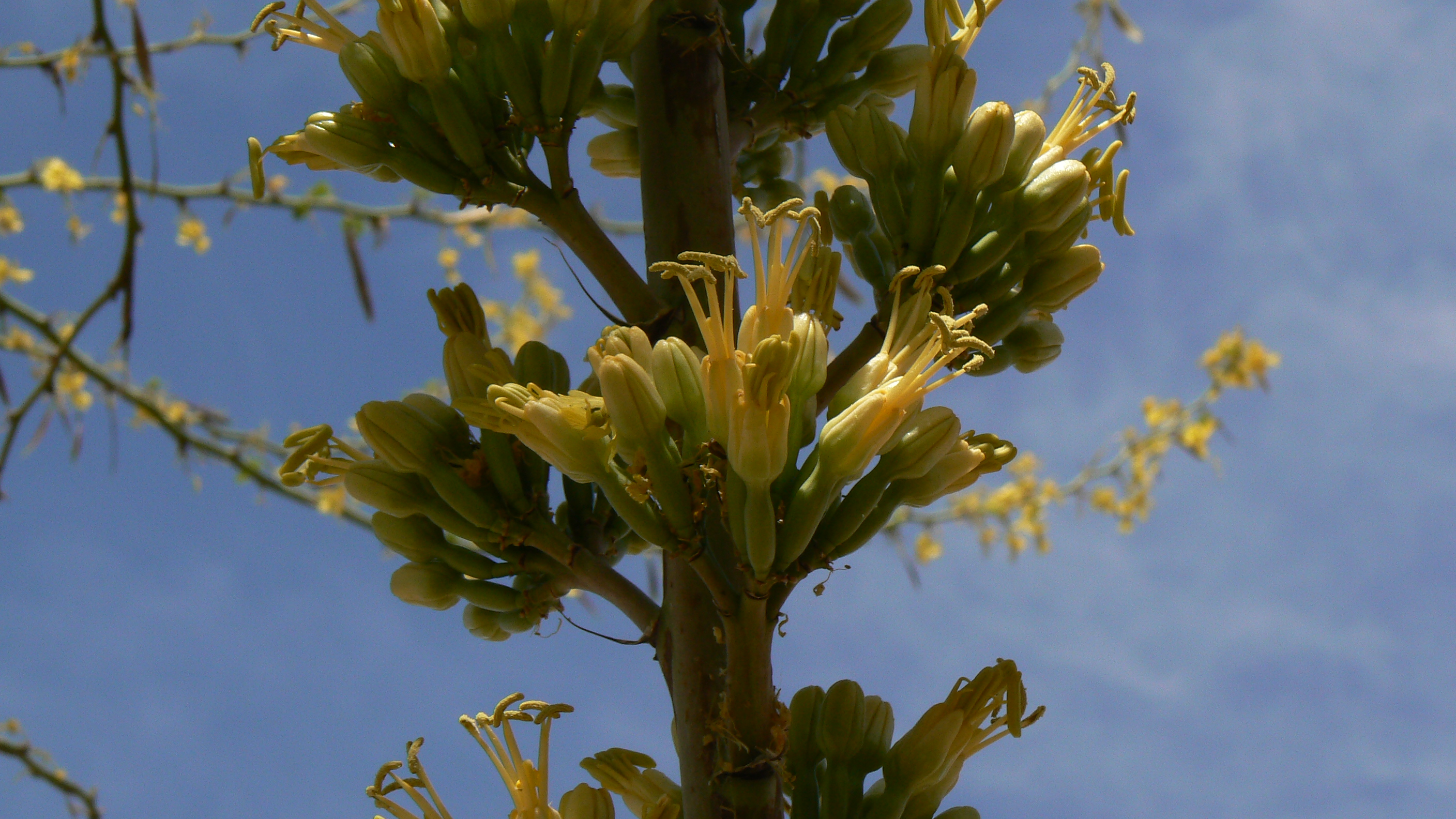
Flowers on the 11 foot tall flowering shaft of Agave x arizonica, flowers of a palo brea (Parkinsonia praecox) tree in background
