= Mary DeDecker =

American botanist and conservationist

- Mary Caroline Foster DeDecker
- Born: October 3, 1909; Guymon, Oklahoma
- Died: September 5, 2000 (aged 90); Independence, Inyo County, California
- Resting place: Independence Cemetery, Inyo County, California
- Citizenship: American
- Known for: Discovered 6 new plants: Astragalus lentiginosus var. piscinensis, Astragalus ravenii Barneby, Dedeckera eurekensis Reveal & Howell, Lomatium inyoense Math. & Const. (now Lomatium foeniculaceum (Nutt.) Coult. & Rose ssp. inyoense (Math. & Const.) Theobald, Lupinus dedeckerae Munz & Dunn (now L. padre-crowleyi C. P. Smith); Trifolium dedeckerae Gillett
- Scientific career
- Fields: Botany

Mary Caroline Foster DeDecker (3 October 1909 – 5 September 2000) was an American botanist, conservationist, environmentalist and founder of the Bristlecone Chapter of the California Native Plant Society. She discovered six new plants, three of which, including Dedeckera eurekensis, are named in her honor. Dedeckera Canyon, south of Eureka Dunes, is also named after her.

== Life ==
Mary Caroline Foster was born 3 October 1909 in Texas County, Oklahoma Barden P. O., later RFD Guymon, in a family of Charles Morrison Foster and Phoebe Arabella Thompson. Her father was a farmer and an office manager for Los Angeles DWP. She studied at Van Nuys High School in the San Fernando Valley and after that completed one year at the University of California, Los Angeles (UCLA).

She lived in Zelzah, now Northridge, until she married Paul DeDecker in 1929. The couple moved to North Hollywood where their daughters were born in 1932 and 1933. In 1935 the DeDeckers moved to Independence, Inyo County, California.

In the 1930s and 1940s she started becoming familiar with the natural history of the Eastern Sierra, during numerous extended camping trips with her family. In 2017 her daughters published a book, Sage & Sierra, in reminiscence of those times. The daughters had left the Eastern Sierra upon graduation from high school.

Mary DeDecker died on 5 September 2000 in Independence at the age of 90 and is buried at Independence Cemetery, Inyo County, California.

== Work ==
In Independence DeDecker met a naturalist Mark Kerr who made an exhibit of the plants and their uses by the Paiute Indians, as well as mounting and labeling many local plants. He taught DeDecker what some of the plants were. He advised him to send unknown specimens to Dr. Philip Munz at Rancho Santa Ana Botanic Garden in Claremont and John Thomas Howell at the California Academy of Sciences in San Francisco. DeDecker started sending plants to them in early 1950s. In 1954 DeDecker started collecting her herbarium that included over 6,000 specimens. She became the pre-eminent plant expert in the northern Mojave Desert and Eastern Sierra Nevada areas.

In 1966 she published a book called Mines of the Eastern Sierra.

After 1967 she focused on plant work and did not search for any other job. She was hired or given contracts for many consulting jobs, largely to fulfill the requirements of the California Environmental Quality Act.

She discovered six new plants: Astragalus lentiginosus var. piscinensis, Astragalus ravenii Barneby, Dedeckera eurekensis Reveal & Howell, Lomatium inyoense Math. & Const. (now Lomatium foeniculaceum (Nutt.) Coult. & Rose subsp. inyoense (Math. & Const.) Theobald), Lupinus dedeckerae Munz & Dunn (now L. padre-crowleyi C.P.Smith) and Trifolium dedeckerae Gillett. Also she made the first collections of the following plants in California, most of them previously known in Nevada: Agave utahensis Engelm. var. eborispina (Hester) Breit., Cryptantha scoparia A. Nels., Cymopterus ripleyi Barneby, Draba cana Rydb., and Eriogonum puberulum S. Wats.

In 1982 DeDecker founded the Bristlecone Chapter of the California Native Plant Society.

In 1984, Susan Cochrane of the California Department of Fish & Game proved successful in her bid to name remote canyon south of Eureka Dunes in honor of DeDecker, hence, it is now called Dedeckera Canyon.

In 1989 DeDecker, as a botanist who spent many years getting acquainted with the California desert, made a statement at the Hearing before the Subcommittee on National Parks and Public Lands of the Committee on Interior and Insular Affairs House of Representatives on California Desert Protection Act of 1989.

DeDecker was active in such organizations as Garden Club, Civic Club, League of Women Voters, botanical organizations, Inyo Associates, Death Valley '49ers. She has served a number of years as Park Liaison Chairman and as second vice-president of the Death Valley '49ers, a supportive organization for Death Valley National Monument.

DeDecker was a community activist in relation to the Owens Valley Committee and Inyo County water issues. She was also active in the Eastern California Museum, mostly a disillusioning experience, and in the Concerned Citizens, an activist organization to fight for the rights of Owens Valley in the water issues. As a hard-working environmentalist she fought to preserve Owens Valley and Eureka Dunes in California.

She was active in the Democratic Party being on the Democratic Central Committee in Inyo County, and was appointed to the State Central Committee by Senator Charles Brown.

In DeDecker's memory and for her many contributions to the botany and history of the Eastern Sierra Nevada and northern Mojave Desert, The Bristlecone Chapter of the California Native Plant Society founded Mary DeDecker Botanical Grant, a small-grants program.

== Publications (selection) ==
- 1966 – Mines of the Eastern Sierra
- 1982 – Eureka Dunes Recovery Plan
- 1984 - Flora of the Northern Mojave Desert, California
- 1993 – White Smith's Fabulous Salt Tram
- 1996 - Bob Eichbaum's Resort and His Toll Road to Death Valley
