= Cornelis Dekker =

Cornelis Dekker may refer to:

- Cornelis Bontekoe (1644?–1685), real surname Dekker, Dutch physician
- Cornelis Gerritsz Decker (1618–1678), Dutch landscape painter
- Cornelis Decker (historian) (1933–2012), Dutch historian
- Cees Dekker (born 1959), Dutch scientist

== See also ==
- Dekker
