= Arnold Geulincx =

Philosopher

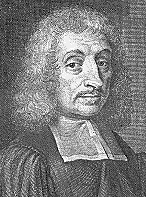
Arnold Geulincx

Arnold Geulincx (Dutch: [ˈɑrnɔlt ˈɣøːlɪŋks]; 31 January 1624 – November 1669), also known by his pseudonym Philaretus, was a Flemish philosopher, metaphysician, and logician. He was one of the followers of René Descartes who tried to work out more detailed versions of a generally Cartesian philosophy. Samuel Beckett cited Geulincx as a key influence and interlocutor because of Geulincx's emphasis on the powerlessness and ignorance of the human condition.

== Life ==
Geulincx was born in Antwerp. He studied philosophy and theology at the University of Leuven and was made professor of philosophy there in 1646. He lost his post in 1658, possibly for religious reasons, or (as has been suggested) a combination of unpopular views and his marriage in that year. In September 1658, Geulincx became a medical doctor. He then moved north to the University of Leiden and converted to Calvinism. Initially he gave private lessons in philosophy. He was appointed reader in logic there in 1662 and professor by special appointment in 1665. Until 1662, Geulincx lived in poverty. He died in Leiden in November 1669, leaving most of his works, all written in Latin, to be published after his death. They were edited by Cornelis Bontekoe.

== Reputation ==
Despite Geulincx's thesis that God cannot act without an instrumentality of variety, he was strongly attacked in the early eighteenth century, for example, by Ruardus Andala and Carolus Tuinman, as a Spinozist. This criticism had originated from Christian Thomasius in 1710. The attack from Andala was on behalf of the "true" Cartesians, classing Geulincx as pernicious, with Burchardus de Volder, Jean LeClerc, Frederik van Leenhof, Pontiaan van Hattem and Willem Deurhoff. Geulincx was also attacked by the Pietist Joachim Lange, as part of a campaign against Christian Wolff; and regarded with Pierre Bayle as insidiously anti-Christian by Johann Franz Buddeus.

== Philosophy ==
Geulincx summarized his philosophy in the phrase "ita est, ergo ita sit" ("it exists, therefore it is so"). He believed in a "pre-established harmony" as a solution to the mind–body problem, dying 25 years before Leibniz's better-remembered formulation of the idea. In Leibniz's philosophy, the doctrine of pre-established harmony was linked with optimism, the notion of this world as the "best of all possible worlds". But Geulincx made no such linkage.

The occasionalism of Geulincx is ethical rather than cosmological in its inception. The first tract of his Ethics is a study of what in his terms are the cardinal virtues. Virtue according to Geulincx is the love of God and of Reason (III, 16–17; 29). The cardinal virtues are the properties of virtue which immediately flow from its very essence and have nothing to do with externals: diligence, obedience, justice, humility (III, 17). Humility divides his view of the world into two parts: one, the understanding of our relation to the world; and the other, the concept of our relation to God. Humility consists in the knowledge of self and the forsaking of self. I find in myself nothing that is my own but to know and to will. I therefore must be conscious of all that I do, and that of which I am not conscious is not the product of my own causality. Hence the universal principle of causality – quod nescis quo modo fiat, non facis – if you do not know how a thing is done, then you do not do it. He also states a form of this principle in his Metaphysica vera. Since, then, the movements of my body take place without my knowing how the nervous impulse passes to the muscles and there causes them to contract, I do not cause my own bodily actions. "I am therefore a mere spectator of this machine. In it I form naught and renew naught, I neither make anything here nor destroy it. Everything is the work of someone else" (III, 33). This one is the Deity who sees and knows all things. The second part of Geulincx's philosophy is connected with Occasionalism as the effect with the cause. Its guiding principle is: Where you can do nothing there also you should desire nothing (III, 222). This leads to a mysticism and asceticism which however must not be taken too seriously for it is tempered by the obligation of caring for the body and propagating the species.

== Legacy ==
He is cited by Samuel Beckett, whose character Murphy remembers the "beautiful Belgo-Latin of Arnold Geulincx" and in particular the gloomy nostrum (frequently repeated by Beckett to inquisitive critics) Ubi nihil vales, ibi nihil velis (roughly: "Where you are worth nothing, there you should want nothing"). In the novel Molloy (1950), Beckett's eponymous character describes himself as "I who had loved the image of old Geulincx, dead young, who left me free, on the black boat of Ulysses, to crawl towards the East, along the deck". Geulincx is also mentioned in Beckett's short story "The End".

A citation of Geulincx's method of despectus sui appears in the "Third Essay" of Nietzsche's Genealogy of Morals.

A quotation from his Ethics (In hoc mundo me extra me nihil agere posse, roughly "In this world I can do nothing outside myself") is used as the epigraph to, and in a sense the title of, A. G. Mojtabai's novel Mundome (1974).

== Works ==
All published in Latin, the works appearing in his lifetime were:

- Quaestiones Quodlibeticae (1653) with later edition Saturnalia;
- Disputatio medica inauguralis de febribus (1658);
- Logica fundamentis suis restituta (1662)
- Methodus inveniendi argumenta. Leyden: [Severinus, Adrianus], 1675. Originally published in 1663. Available at KU Leuven Special Collections.
- De virtute (1665).
- Ethica of zeden-konst. Dordrecht: [Goris, Dirk], 1690. Available at KU Leuven Special Collections.
- Opera philosophica Edited by J. P. N. Land, The Hague, Martinus Nijhoff, 1891–1893 (3 vol.)

The De virtute was the first part of the Ethica, which ran to six parts when published posthumously.

English editions of Geulincx's works:

- Metaphysics, trans. Martin Wilson, Christoffel Press, 1999.
- Ethics, trans. Martin Wilson, Brill, 2006.
