= Dekker =

Dekker is a Dutch occupational surname equivalent to English Thatcher. Notable people with the surname include:

- Aesop Dekker (born 1970), American rock drummer
- Albert Dekker (1905–1968), American actor and politician
- An Dekker (1931–2012), Dutch sculptor, graphic designer, and publisher
- Anne Fleur Dekker (born 1994), Dutch environmentalist and journalist
- Ans Dekker (born 1955), Dutch gymnast
- Anouk Dekker (born 1986), Dutch footballer
- Britt Dekker (born 1992), Dutch actress and television presenter
- Carl Dekker (1922–2000), pseudonym of the Australian historian and journalist John Laffin
- Cees Dekker (born 1959), Dutch physicist
- Chris Dekker (born 1945), Dutch footballer
- Ben Dekker (born 1940), South African forester, actor, politician, poet and artist.
- Cornelis Dekker (c.1645–1685), Dutch physician and essayist known as Cornelis Bontekoe
- Cornelis Gerrits Dekker (1618–1678), Dutch landscape painter
- Daniël Dekker (born 1960), Dutch disc jockey and radio host
- Desmond Dekker (1941–2006), Jamaican singer
- Eduard Douwes Dekker (1820–1887), Dutch writer; also known as Multatuli
- Elani Dekker, South African actress and artist
- Elly Dekker (born 1943), Dutch astrophysicist and museum curator
- Ernest Douwes Dekker (1879–1950), Dutch politician and writer. Also known as Danudirja Setiabud
- Erik Dekker (born 1970), Dutch racing cyclist
- Femke Dekker (born 1979), Dutch rower
- Frans Dekker (1684–1751), Dutch painter
- Fred Dekker (born 1959), American film director and writer
- Gé Dekker (1904–1995), Dutch competitive swimmer
- Han Dekker (1913–?), Dutch rower
- Hannie Singer-Dekker (1917–2007), Dutch Labour Party politician
- Hendrik Adriaan Christiaan Dekker (1836–1905), Dutch painter and lithographer
- Hind Dekker-Abdulaziz (born 1981), Iraqi-born Dutch politician
- Inge Dekker (born 1985), Dutch competitive swimmer
- Jacob Gelt Dekker (1948–2019), Dutch businessman, philanthropist, and writer
- Jan Dekker (basketball)
- Jan Dekker (sailor) (born 1967), French/South African competitive sailor
- Jan Dekker (born 1990), Dutch darts player
- Jens Dekker (born 1998), Dutch cyclo-cross cyclist
- Jeremias de Dekker (c. 1610 – 1666), Dutch poet
- Job Dekker, Dutch biologist
- Jonathan Dekker (born 1983), American football tight end
- Laura Dekker (born 1995), New Zealand-born Dutch solo sailor
- Lia Dekker (born 1987), Dutch competitive swimmer
- Louis Dekker (1894–1973), Dutch coxswain
- Marcel Dekker (born 1930s), Dutch-born American encyclopedia publisher
- Mark Dekker (born 1969), Zimbabwean cricketer
- Maurits Dekker (1896–1962), Dutch novelist and playwright
- Maxim Dekker (born 2004), Dutch footballer
- Michelle Dekker (born 1996), Dutch snowboarder
- Niels Dekker (born 1983), Dutch-born Canadian soccer player
- Paul Dekker (1931–2001), Canadian-American football player
- Rachelle Dekker (born 1986), American novelist, daughter of Ted Dekker
- Rick Dekker (born 1995), Dutch footballer
- Ron Dekker (born 1966), Dutch competitive swimmer
- Roxy Dekker (born 2005), Dutch singer and songwriter
- Sam Dekker (born 1994), American basketball player
- Sander Dekker (born 1975), Dutch VVD politician
- Sidney Dekker (born 1969), Dutch-born psychologist and safety scientist
- Steve Dekker (born 1988), Dutch DJ known as "Dr. Peacock"
- Sybilla Dekker (born 1942), Dutch VVD politician
- Ted Dekker (born 1962), Indonesian-born American author
- Theodorus Dekker (1927–2021), Dutch mathematician known for Dekker's algorithm
- Thijs Dekker (born 1997), Dutch footballer
- Thomas Dekker (writer) (c. 1572 – 1632), English writer
- Thomas Dekker (cyclist) (born 1984), Dutch racing cyclist
- Thomas Dekker (actor) (born 1987), American actor
- Tim Dekker (born 1993), Dutch decathlete
- Tony Dekker (born 1980s), Canadian singer and songwriter
- Travis Dekker (born 1985), American football tight end
- Tristan Dekker (born 1996), Dutch footballer
- Vince Gino Dekker (born 1997), Dutch footballer
- Wade Dekker (born 1994), Australian soccer player
- Wisse Dekker (1924–2012), Dutch businessman; CEO of Philips

== Fictional characters ==
- John Dekker (Wing Commander), computer game character
- Maggie Dekker, character in the TV series Eli Stone

== Given name ==
- Dekker Curry (born 1966), Irish cricketer
- Dekker Dreyer (born 1980), American film director and producer

== See also ==
- Dekkers (surname)
- Decker (surname)
- Den Dekker
