= Climacteric =

Climacteric may refer to:

- Climacteric (human), the time in most women's lives when menstrual periods stop permanently
- Climacteric (botany), a stage of fruit ripening
- Climacteric (journal), a journal published by Informa Healthcare
- Climacteric year, in astrology
