= Erick Schat's Bakkerÿ =

Bakery in California

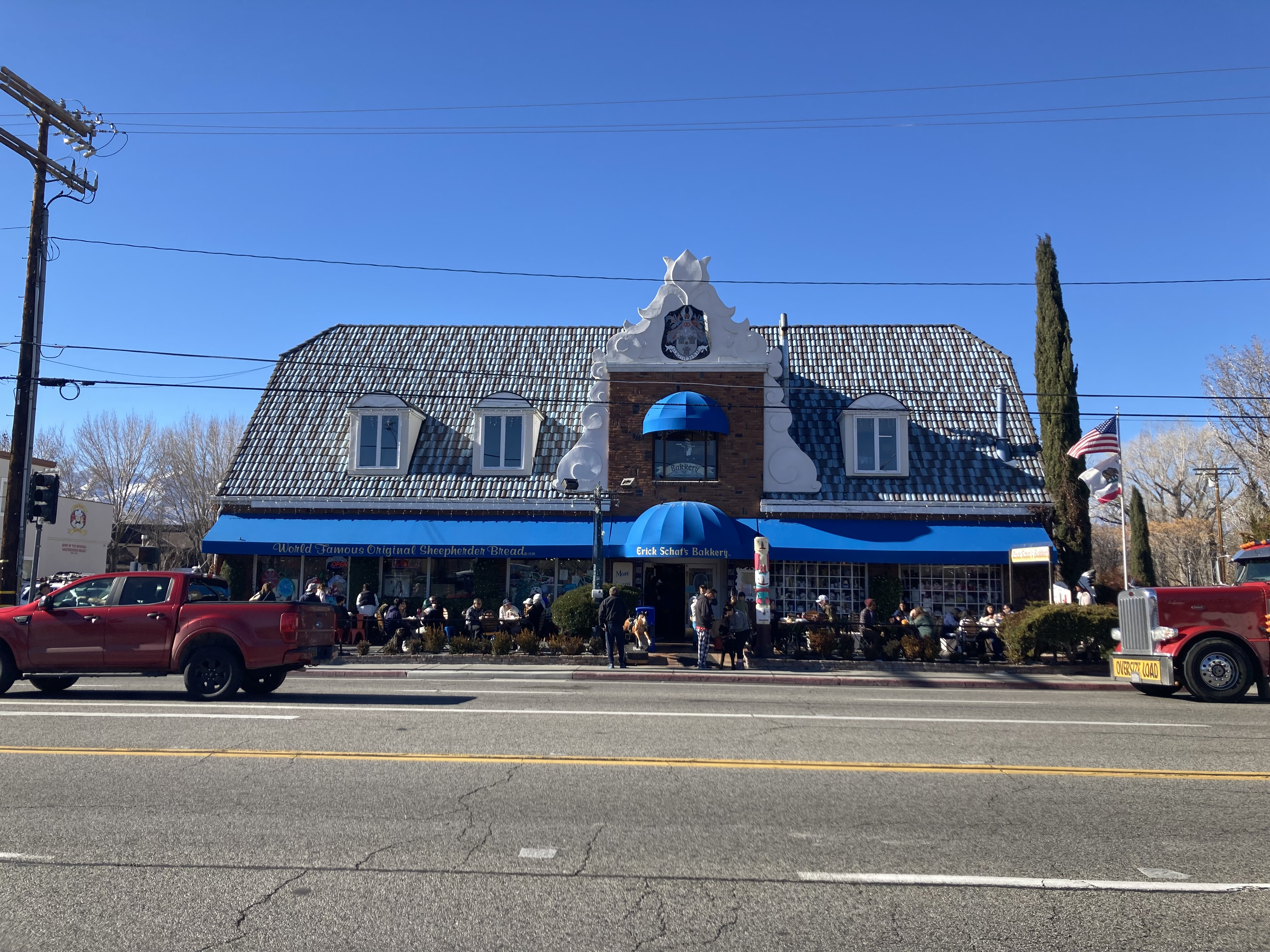
- The bakery in January 2024

- Location within California Location within the United States

Restaurant information
- Established: 1903
- Owner: Schat family
- Food type: Bread and pastries
- Location: 763 N Main St, Bishop, CA 93514
- Coordinates: 37.3686°N 118.3956°W
- Website: schatsbakery.com

Erick Schat's Bakkerÿ, also formatted as Erick Schat's Bakery, is a bakery in Bishop, California. It is known for its extensive bread production and its status as a pit stop to travelers along US 395 in the Eastern Sierra region. In 2021, it received 2.5 million visitors.

== History ==
The original bakery was started by the Schoch family from Vienna in 1903. Basque sheepherders had the Schochs build a stone oven to bake their sheepherder bread and keep it fresh while they were out tending their flocks. Jacob "Jack" Schat, immigrated to the U.S. from Utrecht in the Netherlands in 1950, subsequently finding work at the Schoch's bakery in Bishop. Baking in his family went as far back as 1893. He eventually bought the bakery and had six children, including Erick, the shop's namesake and owner until he died in 2021. The bakery became more well-known when the family sold wholesale goods to 2,000 grocery stores in Greater Los Angeles, including Safeway, Vons, and Albertsons.

The family expanded their operations by opening David Schat's Bakery Cafe and Aaron Schat's Roadhouse in October 2011 in El Segundo and August 2014 in Bishop, respectively. The bakery cafe is more of a small version of the original, and closed in December 2012, after only a year of service due to a lack of customers. The roadhouse serves various sandwiches on bread from the bakery and is still open as of 2024. There are also locations in Carson City, Utah, and Ontario. All of the bakeries under the Schat "brand" are not part of a franchise; they are only owned by members of the same family.

== Menu ==
=== Sheepherder bread ===
One of the bakery's main trademarks is its sheepherder bread. The bread was introduced to the Owens Valley during California Gold Rush by Basque immigrants in 1907 who missed their home country's bread. They hand-shaped the loaves and used stone ovens when producing it. This practice is continued by the bakery when making their bread. It is made from "butter, grade AA eggs, unbleached flour, cane sugar, and artesian well water." It was trademarked in 1938.

=== Other items ===
The bakery also sells many other varieties of bread and pastries, including squaw, cinnamon pull-apart brioches, turnovers, éclairs, sourdough, oliebol, macarons, plain cheese, and chili-cheese.

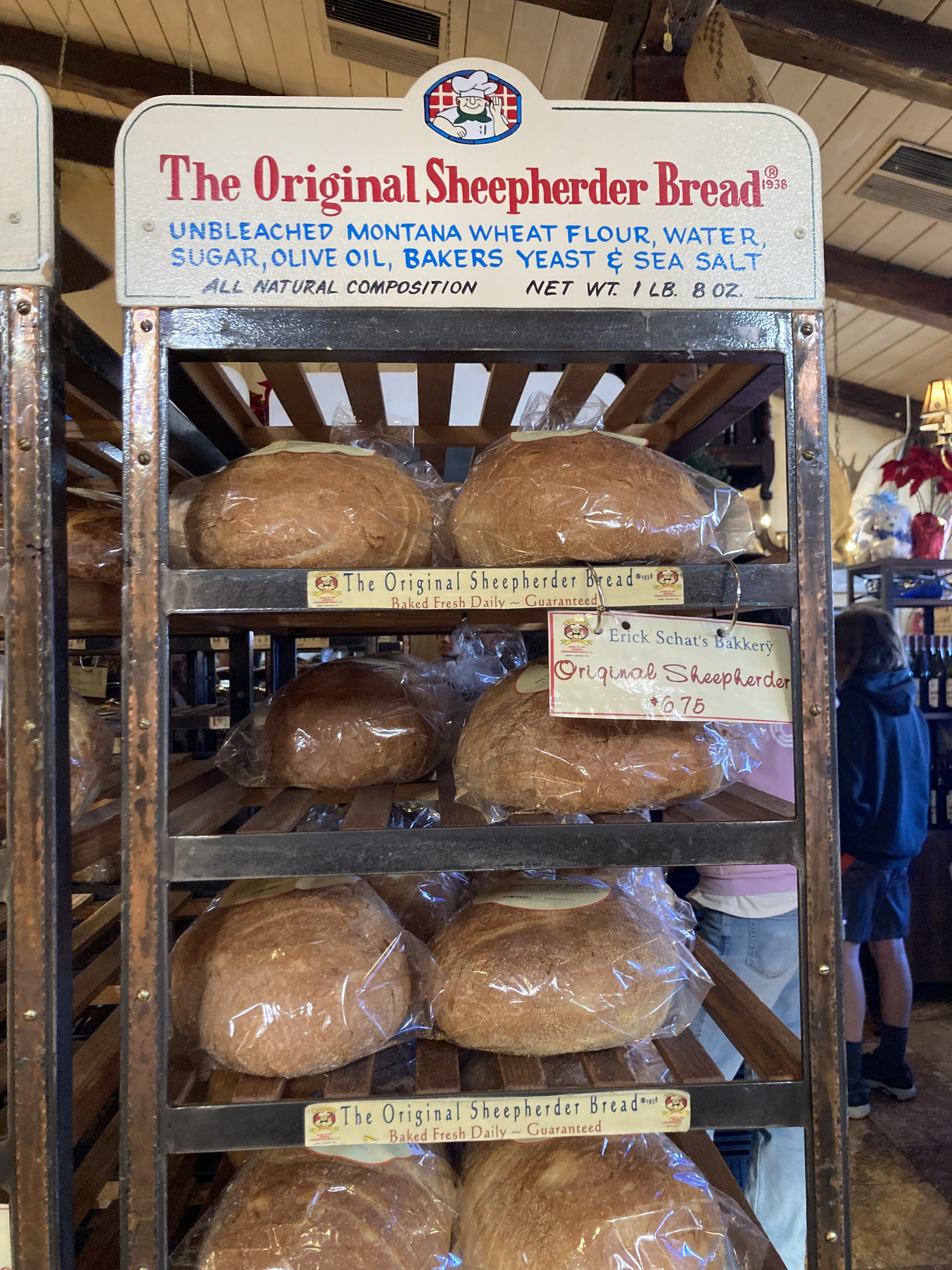
Sheepherder bread on racks in the bakery
