= John J. Crowley =

Catholic priest

Father John J. Crowley
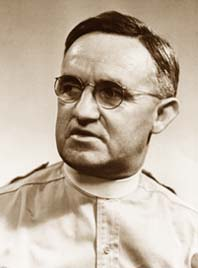
- Born: December 8, 1891; Killarney, County Kerry, Ireland
- Died: March 17, 1940 (aged 48); Kern County, California, U.S.
- Education: College of the Holy Cross (BA)
- Occupations: Priest; activist

Fr. John J. Crowley (December 8, 1891 - March 17, 1940), often referred to as the Desert Padre, was an early 20th century Catholic priest in California's large but sparsely populated Eastern Sierra and Death Valley. He served there from 1919 to 1924, and again from 1934 through 1940.

Crowley is remembered for his efforts to help improve the economic well-being of Eastern Sierra residents whose lives had been adversely affected by the diversion of water from the Owens Valley to the rapidly growing but water-deficient Los Angeles area (see: California water wars).

== Life ==
=== Early life ===
Crowley was a native of 12 New Street, Killarney, Co. Kerry, Ireland who came to Worcester, Massachusetts, with his family when he was 11 years old. He was the eldest of 4 brothers and 4 sisters. His father died only a few years after immigration, leaving the family in difficult economic conditions. John took a family leadership role and "learned responsibility that served him well in his later career". He studied at the College of the Holy Cross in Worcester, earning a Bachelor of Arts degree in 1915. His faculty prefect described him as "one of the best young men Holy Cross has reared in recent years".

=== Career ===
He was ordained a priest of the Catholic Church in 1918, and shortly thereafter, now Father Crowley, he left to take up a position in Southern California, where priests were especially needed. He served for about a year in the Los Angeles area, then volunteered (and was subsequently appointed) to be the lone priest for the Eastern Sierra in 1919. In 1924 he was chosen, because of his much admired administrative abilities, to be Chancellor to the newly created Roman Catholic Diocese of Monterey-Fresno. In 1925 he was anointed Monsignor by Pope Pius XI.

In 1934, he transferred back to the Eastern Sierra, and was based out of Lone Pine for the remainder of his life. The he served the area's small Catholic population--about 600 in total spread across Inyo County's huge geographical size--and eventually engaged in activities to help the well-being of all of the area's residents.

==== Sage and Tumbleweed newspaper column ====
During his time as priest for Eastern California, Crowley wrote a regular column for the Central California Register newspaper of Fresno, a Catholic periodical. The column was titled "Sage and Tumbleweed," and they ran regularly from 12 August 1934 through 22 March 1940.

The articles were written from the perspective of a fictional character named "Inyokel" (a combination of "Inyo" and "yokel") who supposedly traveled everywhere with Crowley; despite the invention of a fake narrator, the pieces often gave Crowley's perspective on current events and often included valuable historic information about Inyo County and Death Valley.

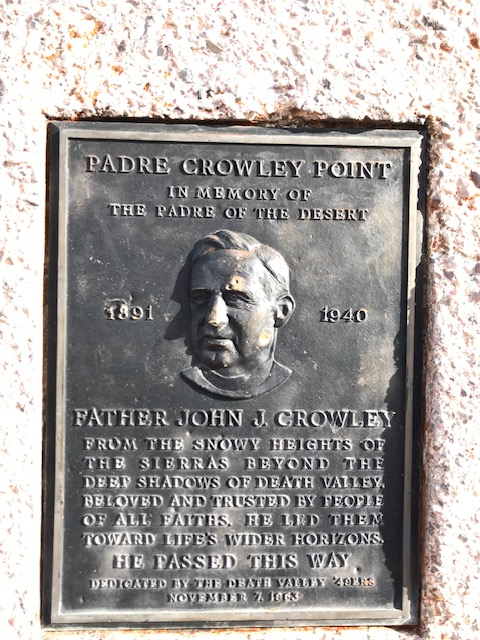
Memorial plaque at Father Crowley Vista Point in Death Valley.

==== Inyo Associates ====
In 1913, Los Angeles opened an aqueduct from Inyo County to supply the city with water, which brought about many challenges for the small county. The relationship between Inyo County and Los Angeles was strained from the beginning, and only got worse over subsequent decades throughout the period known as the California Water Wars.

In response to this issue, Crowley helped create Inyo Associates in 1935, a regular meeting of representatives from organizations across the Owens Valley which aimed to improve relations between Eastern California residents and the Los Angeles Department of Water and Power (LADWP). Representatives from communities across the valley were welcomed at its regular social meetings, which occurred at various locations around the huge county. The meetings provided an opportunity for participants to share recent happenings within each organization and town, as well as to foster goodwill between these groups.

Inyo Associates initially drew suspicion from both sides of the aisle. DWP head Harvey Van Norman told the priest, "Father Crowley, we own Owens Valley. We propose to have no interference. There are no issues for discussion." The Inyo Board of supervisors also refused to lend support at first. California water historian William Kahrl writes that Los Angeles eventually agreed to participate after Crowley's tireless campaigning showed that the priest did not pose a threat to the city. Rather, Crowley "was in fact working tirelessly to lend form and substance to the [Department of Water and Power's] own vague ideas on recreational development in the Owens Valley," which had gone unrealized up until that time.

The first Inyo Associates meeting was held on 29 October 1935 at the Inyo County Courthouse. Inyo Associates still meets regularly today at revolving locations around the county, and now welcomes representatives from any organization within the Owens Valley to speak about their group and socialize with other participants. To accommodate for the county's large size, the meetings are now held at various halls and community centers throughout the area.

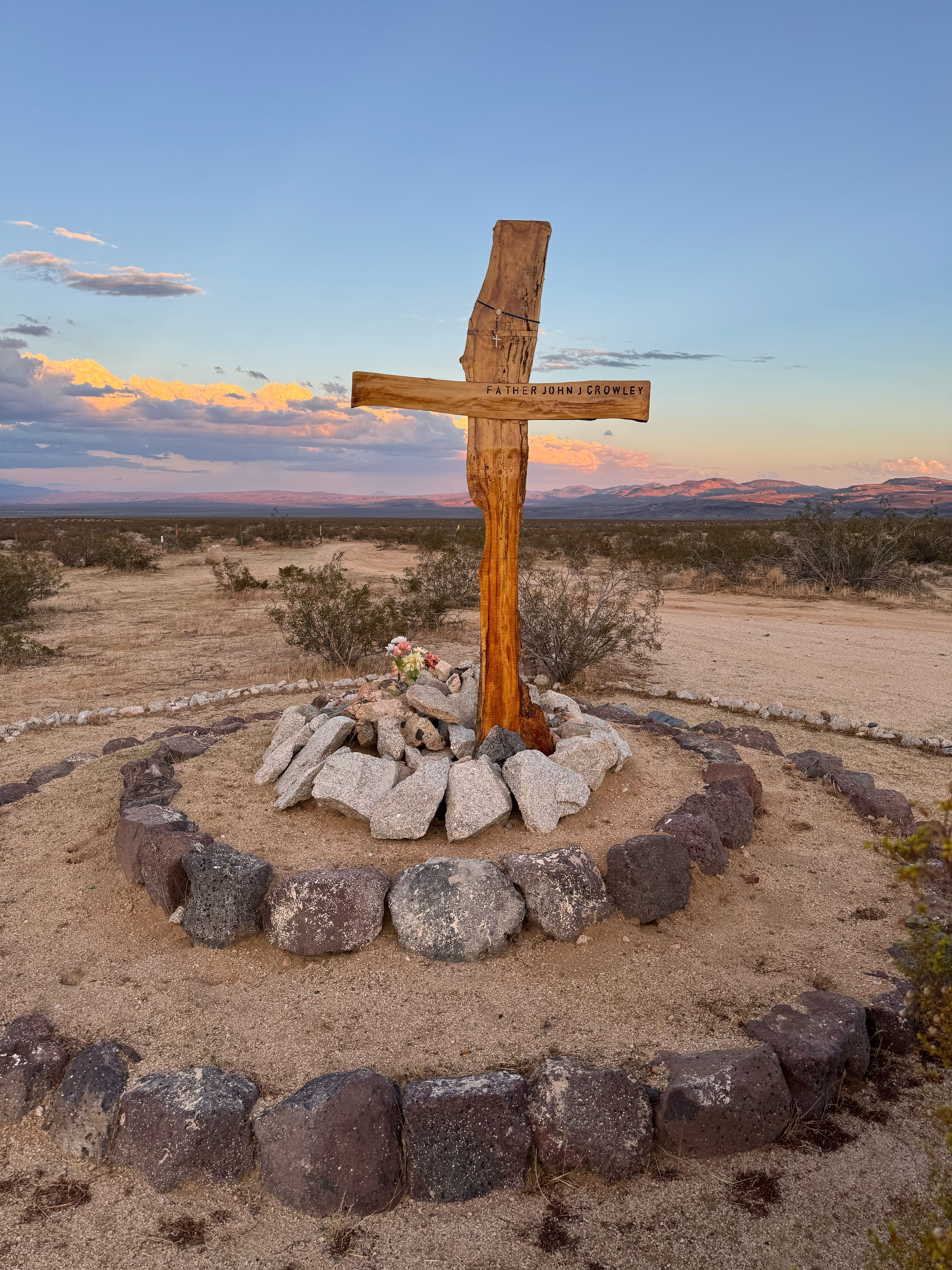
Father Crowley Monument at Inyokern near the site of his death as it appeared in September 2025.

== Death ==
On Saturday 16 March 1940, Crowley attended the funeral of his friend Sister Anna in San Francisco. He then began driving back to Inyo County, intending to lead the 6:30AM mass in Death Valley the following morning.

At about 3AM on the morning of 17 March 1940, Crowley was driving north along California State Route 14 near Inyokern when he hit a wandering steer and was deflected head on into an oncoming truck. Crowley died instantly. He was 48 years old.

== Legacy ==
His efforts in the Eastern Sierra centered largely on enhancing tourism to the area, which includes the lowest geographical point, in Death Valley, and the highest point (at that time, among the 48 states), Mount Whitney. Nature lovers, campers, hikers, and sport fisher persons were addressed and stars in the many movies filmed in the area were engaged. His achievements were the subject of an essay by Irving Stone in 1944, which was a featured article in The Saturday Evening Post.

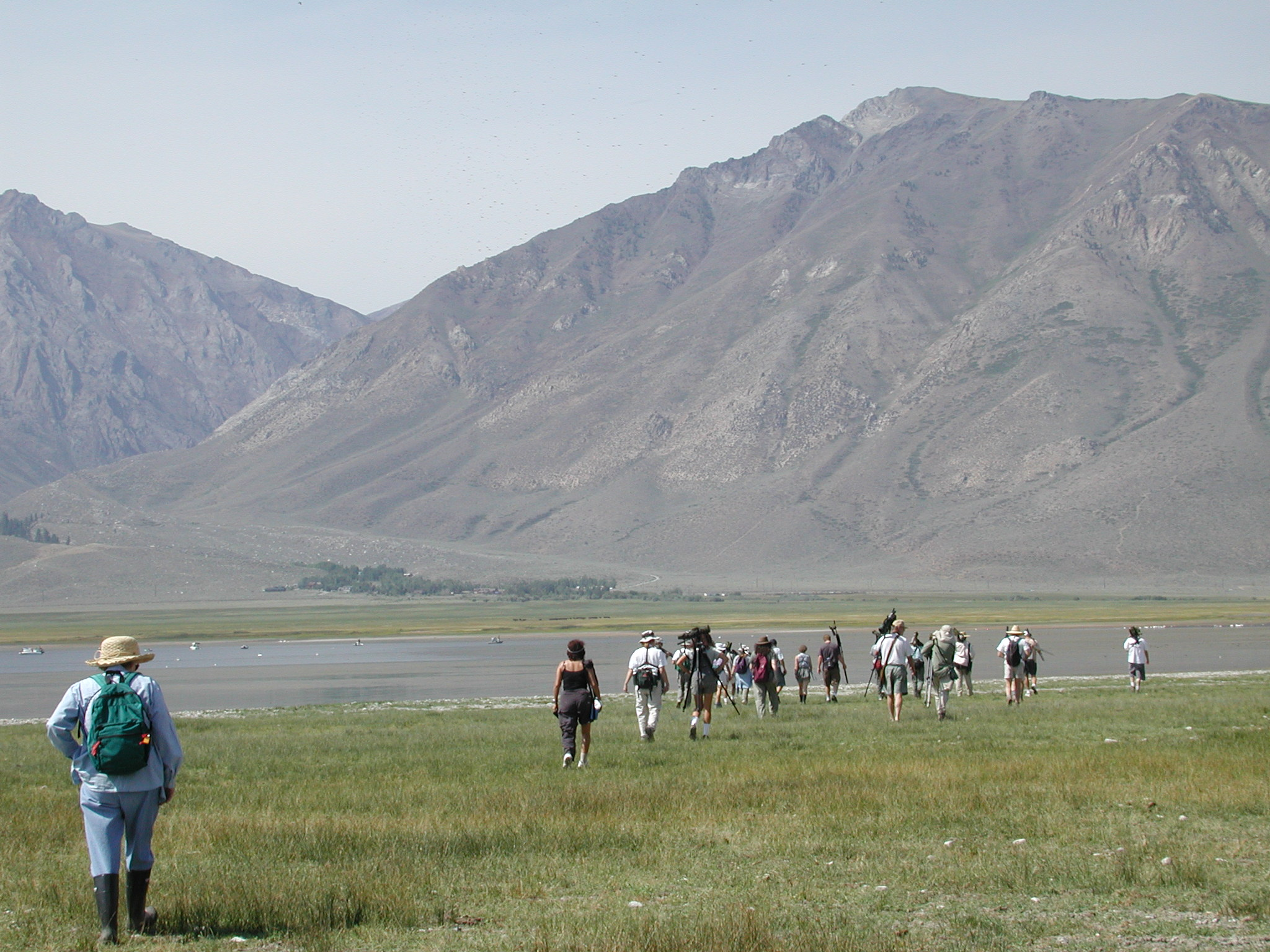
A group of bird watchers at Crowley Lake, August 8, 2002

=== Father Crowley Monument ===
Several weeks after Crowley died, Civilian Conservation Corps Company 3223 "erected a cement cross with a three tiered-dais of native rock beside the highway where he had been killed." The cross was dedicated at a memorial event on the first anniversary of his death, and was attended by about 100 people. The original cross was destroyed by vandals. The monument was eventually rebuilt and maintained by the Ridgecrest chapter of the Knights of Columbus, and now exists as a wooden cross on the east side of the intersection of Shurite Road and Highway 14.

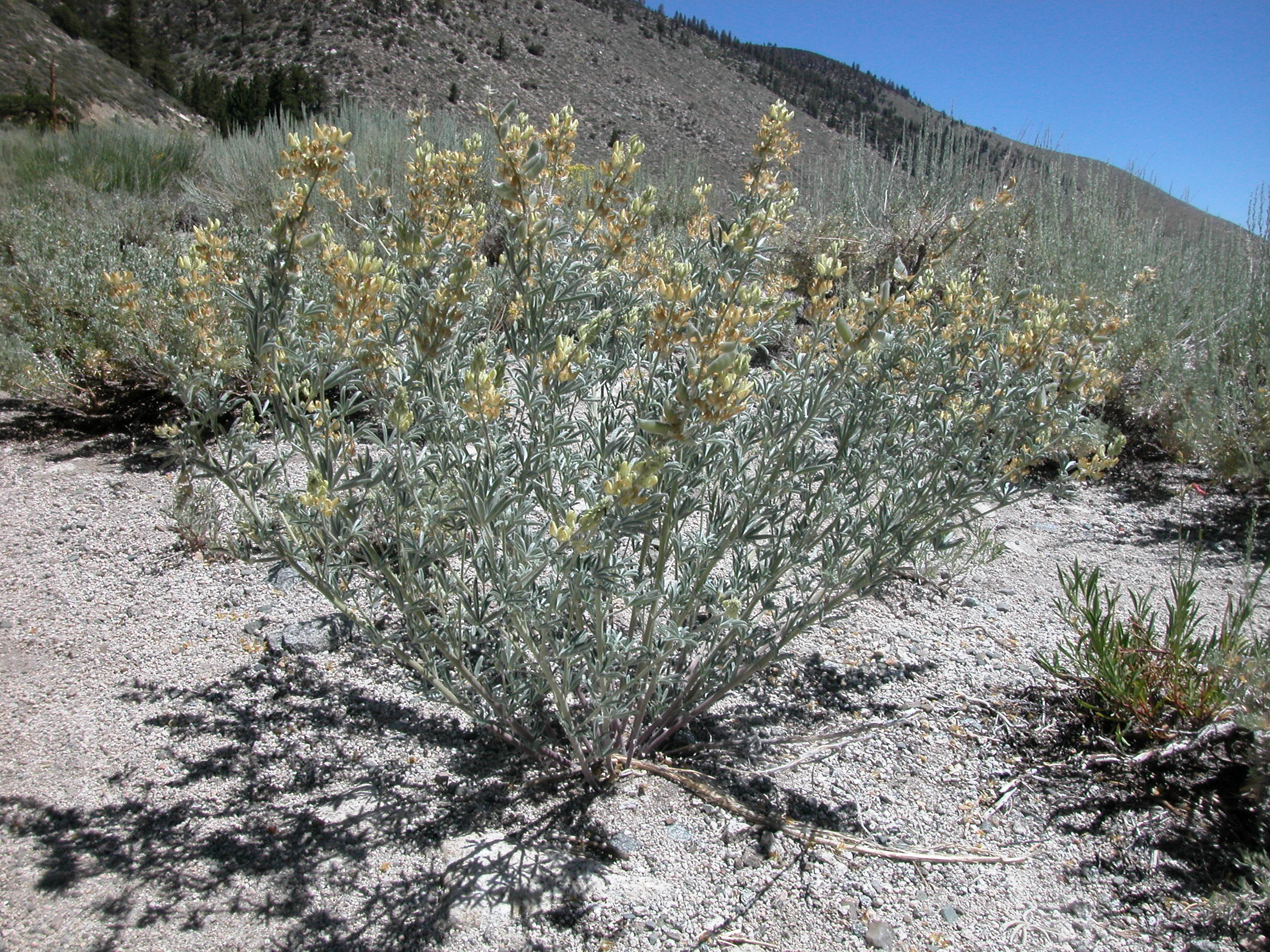
Lupinus padre-crowleyi in California's Eastern Sierra, July 9, 2003

=== Crowley Lake ===
Crowley Lake, which formed behind a dam built by the Los Angeles Department of Water and Power to help regulate the flow of water to Los Angeles, was named in honor of Fr. Crowley.

=== Father Crowley Vista Point ===
Now within Death Valley National Park, the Vista Point overlooks Rainbow Canyon and the dramatic western approach to the Panamint Range and Telescope Peak, on the other side of which lies Death Valley.

=== Father Crowley's lupine ===
This rare lupinus species, officially classified as Lupinus padre-crowleyi in 1945 and commonly called Father Crowley's lupine, occurs in a few high elevation areas on the eastern slopes of the Sierra Nevada.
