= Portrait of Jeremias de Dekker =

1655 painting by Rembrandt

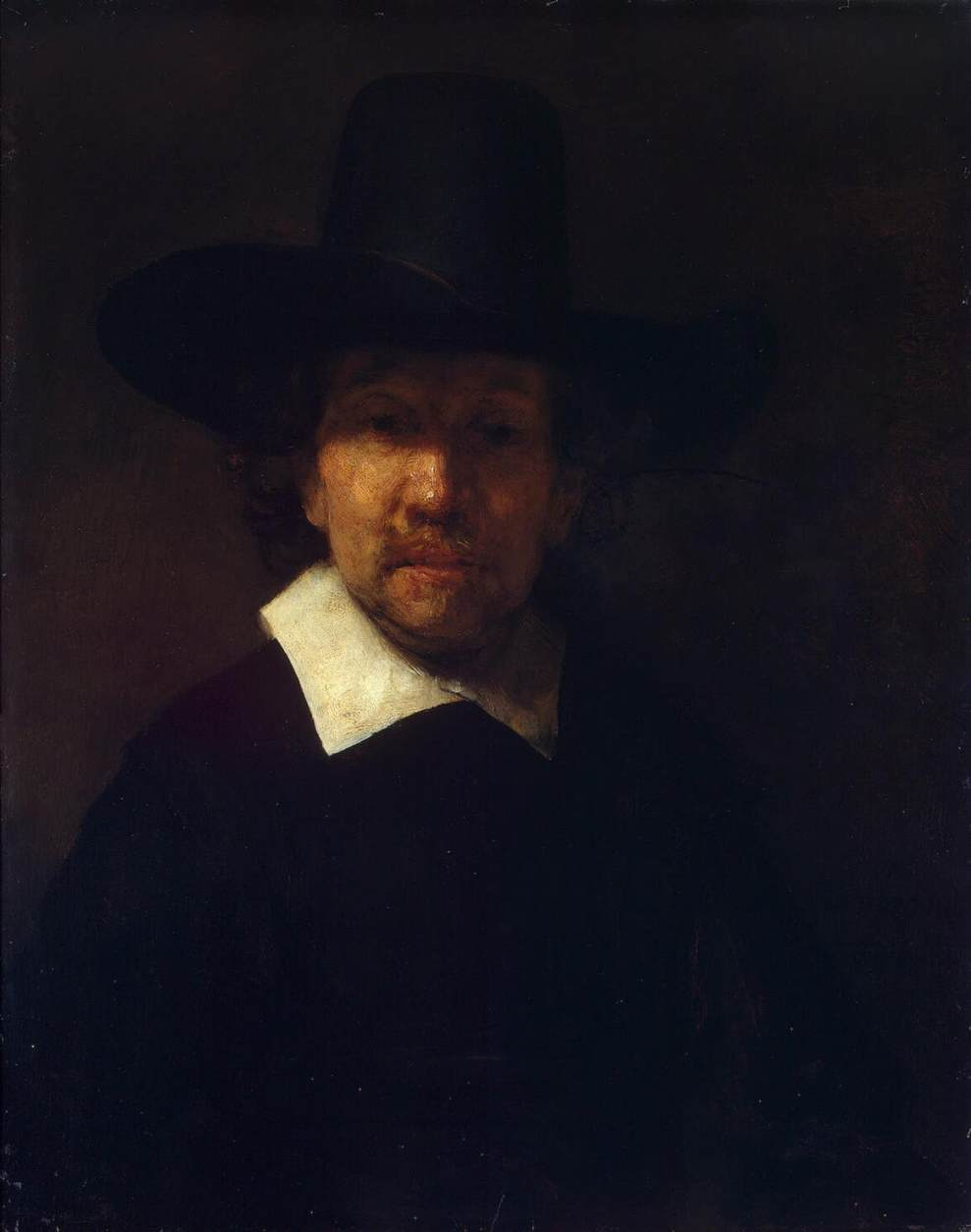

Portrait of Jeremias de Decker is a 1655 oil on panel painting by Rembrandt of the poet Jeremias de Decker. It is now in the Hermitage Museum.

== Sources ==
- http://www.hermitagemuseum.org/fcgi-bin/db2www/descrPage.mac/descrPage?selLang=English&indexClass=PICTURE_EN&PID=GJ-748&numView=1&ID_NUM=44&thumbFile=%2Ftmplobs%2FKGCZ_40O_40ZNKW_40218B6.jpg&embViewVer=last&comeFrom=quick
