= Den Dekker =

Den Dekker is a Dutch occupational surname meaning "the thatcher". Other, more common forms of the surname are De Decker, De Dekker, and Dekker. Notable people named Den Dekker include:

- Matt den Dekker (born 1987), American baseball outfielder
- Michelle den Dekker (born 1966), Australian netball player
- Nathalie den Dekker (born 1989), Dutch lawyer and beauty queen
- Michael DenDekker (born 1961), American (New York) politician
