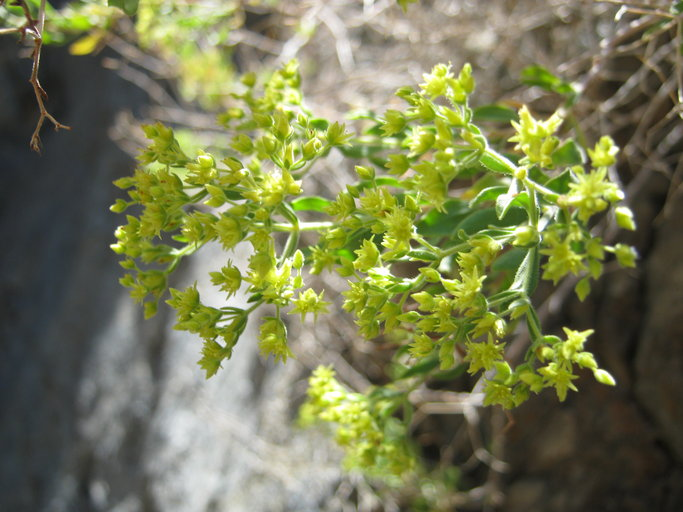
- Dedeckera eurekensis flowers

Conservation status
- Vulnerable (NatureServe)

Scientific classification
- Kingdom: Plantae
- Clade: Tracheophytes
- Clade: Angiosperms
- Clade: Eudicots
- Order: Caryophyllales
- Family: Polygonaceae
- Subfamily: Eriogonoideae
- Genus: Dedeckera; Reveal & J.T.Howell
- Species: D. eurekensis

Binomial name
- Dedeckera eurekensis Reveal & J.T.Howell

= Dedeckera =

Genus of flowering plants

The monotypic genus Dedeckera contains the single species Dedeckera eurekensis, a plant known by the common name July gold which is endemic to California. It is found in the mountains east and south of the Sierra Nevada, especially the Inyo and White Mountains.

July gold is a member of the buckwheat family. It is a matting shrub which bears small fleshy leaves and tiny yellowish flowers. It is a plant of the dry mountainous scrub, where it grows on gritty limestone cliffs. July gold is a rare plant, and its populations are scattered due to its specific niche habitat. It is also a poor reproducer; only about one percent of its flower ovules produce viable seed. These factors make it a species of concern.

The genus was named for California botanist Mary C. DeDecker. DeDecker found the plant in Death Valley National Park in 1976.

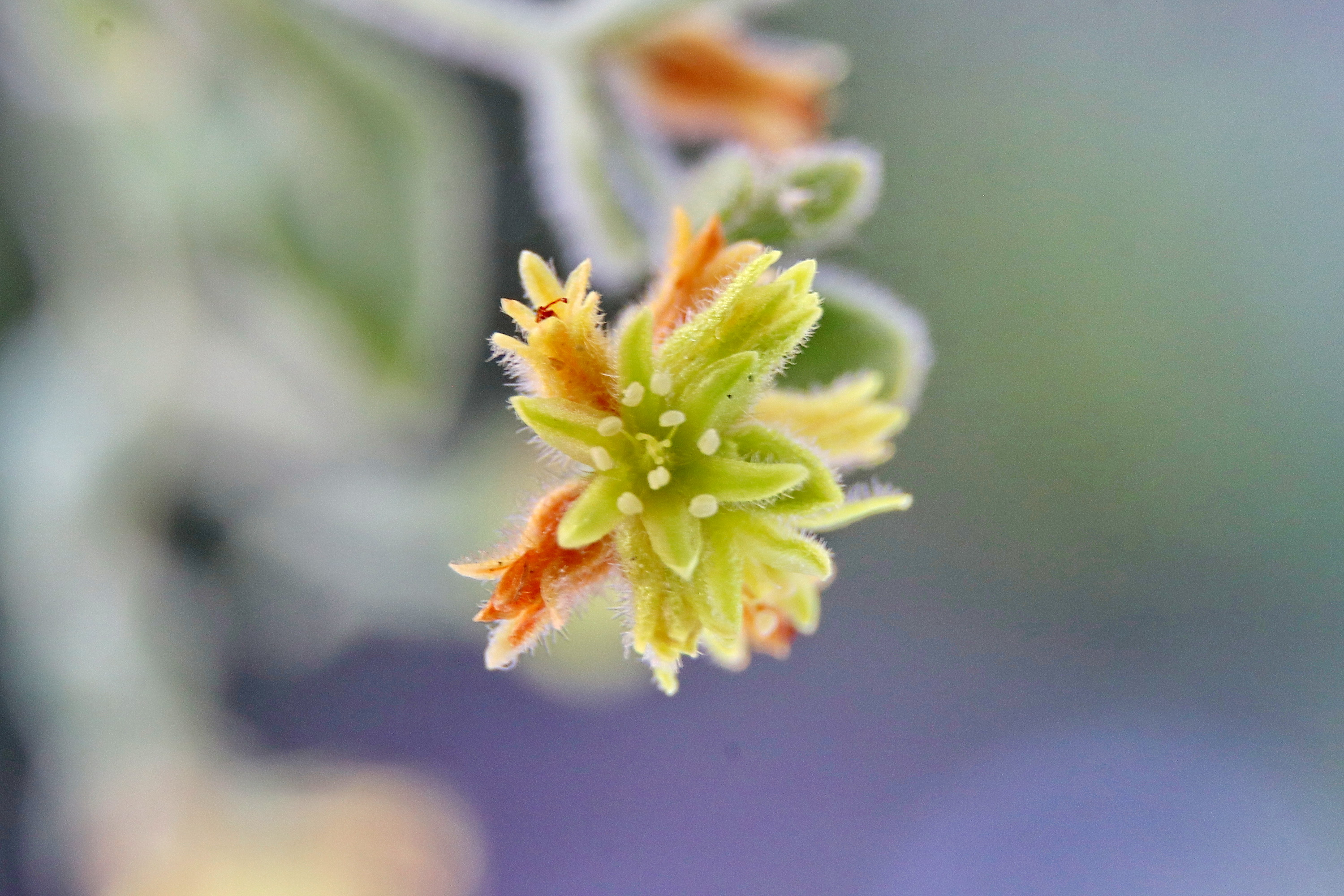
