= Cornelis Bontekoe =

Dutch physician and essayist (1647–1685)

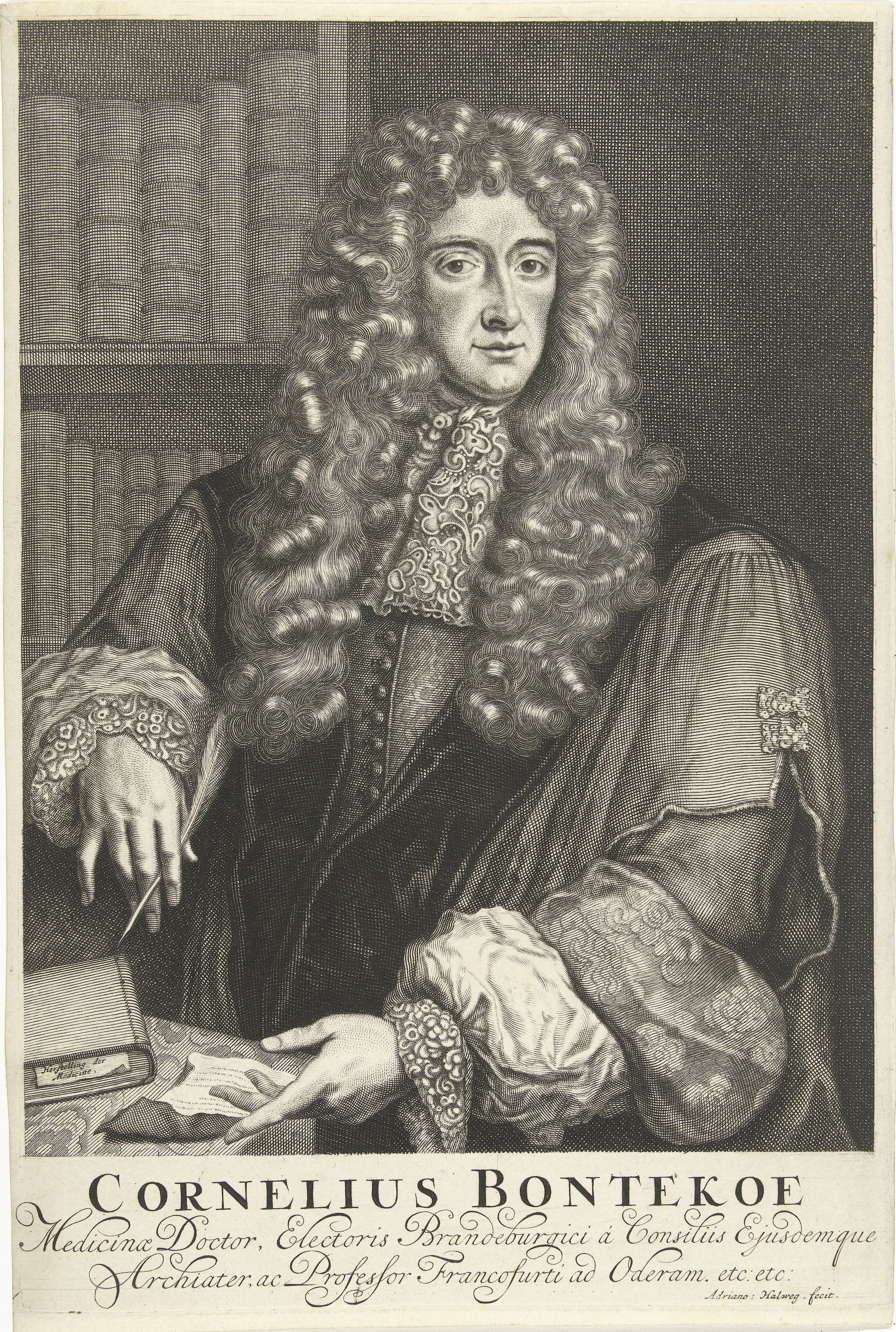
Cornelis Bontekoe. Engraving by Adriaen Haelwegh.

Cornelis Bontekoe (1647 in Alkmaar – 13 January 1685 in Berlin), whose real name was Cornelis Dekker, was a Dutch physician known also as a popular essayist, particularly on his promotion of tea, and editor of the works of Arnold Geulincx, a Belgian philosopher. He also applied what were generally Cartesian theories in medicine, but with innovations such as a purely hydraulic and muscular explanation of the mechanism of the heart.

== Life ==
In an itinerant and stormy life, Bontekoe, who took his pseudonym from the spotted cow on the sign of his Mennonite father Gerrit Dekker's grocery shop in Alkmaar, courted controversy and agitated for reform and more modern thinking in medicine. He studied at the University of Leiden under Franciscus Sylvius and Geulincx, graduating M.D. in 1667. In conflict with the medical men of Alkmaar, he moved his practice. He returned for a second period at Leiden in 1674, where Theodoor Craanen was his teacher. His vocal opposition to Aristotelian teaching saw him banned at Leiden, with Johannes Swartenhengst, in 1675. He was, however, readmitted in 1676 to the university, where his follower Heydentryk Overcamp graduated M.D. in 1677.

Bontekoe's Tractaat advocating tea-drinking appeared in 1678 and made him his reputation. Via Amsterdam, he moved to Hamburg, where he wrote a work against the concept of a climacteric year, which he dedicated to Frederick William I, Elector of Brandenburg. The Elector rewarded him with positions as a court physician and as a professor at the University of Frankfurt an der Oder.

Bontekoe moved to Prussia. He had patients in Berlin-Cölln and died there.
