= Alfdan De Decker =

Belgian cyclist (born 1996)

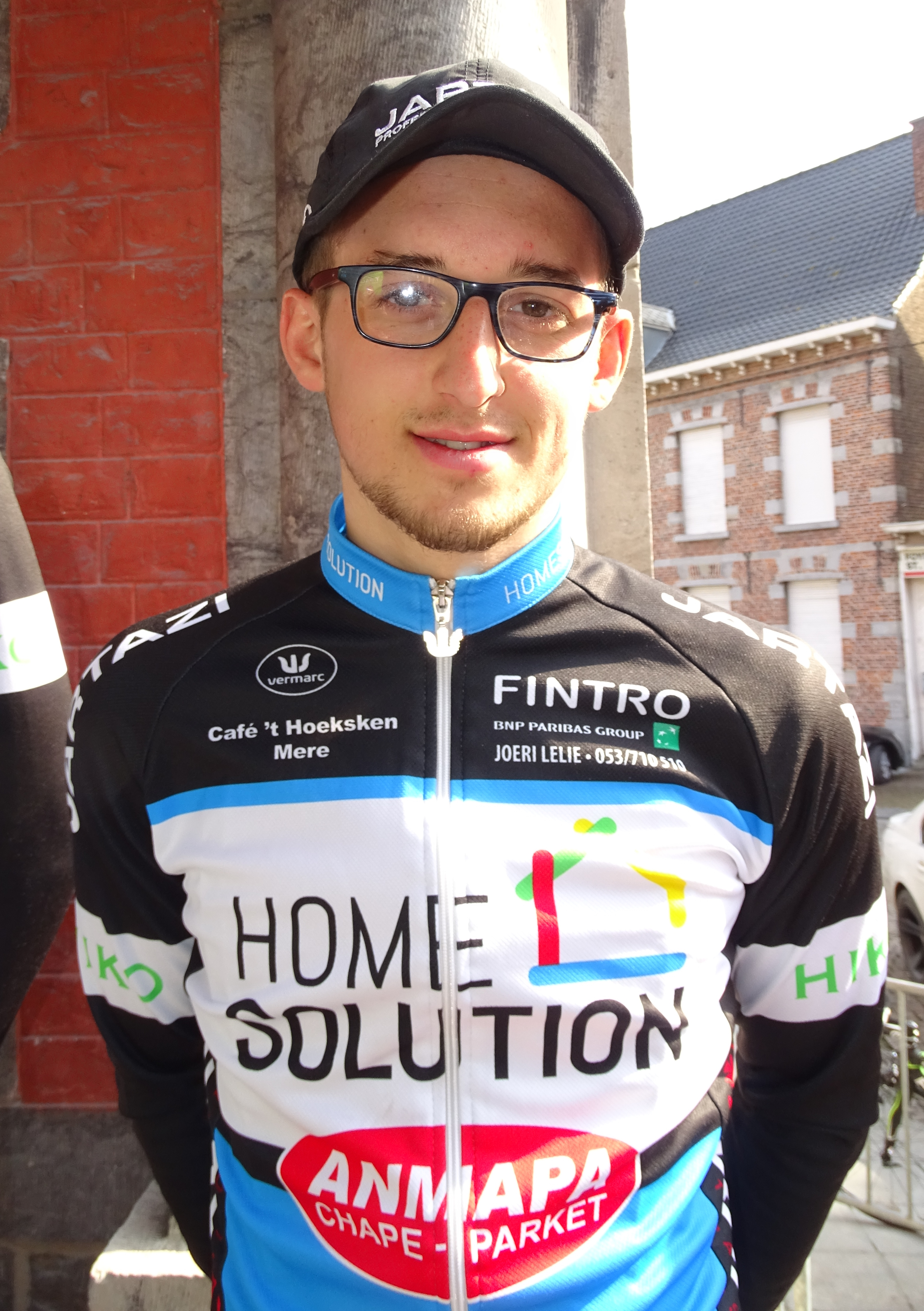
- De Decker in 2016.

Personal information
- Full name: Alfdan De Decker
- Born: 9 September 1996 (age 30) Brasschaat, Belgium
- Height: 1.7 m (5 ft 7 in)
- Weight: 68 kg (150 lb)

Cycling career
- Sport: Cycling
- Current team: Antwerp Cycling Team Kontich
- Discipline: Road
- Role: Rider
- Rider type: Sprinter

Amateur teams
- 2015: Van Der Vurst–Hiko
- 2016: Home Solution–Anmapa–Soenens
- 2017–2018: Lotto–Soudal U23
- 2022: Wielerclub Steeds Vooraan Kontich
- 2023–: Antwerp Cycling Team Kontich

Professional teams
- 2018: Wanty–Groupe Gobert (stagiaire)
- 2019–2020: Wanty–Gobert
- 2021: Tarteletto–Isorex

Alfdan De Decker (born 9 September 1996) is a Belgian cyclist, who currently rides for amateur team Antwerp Cycling Team Kontich.

His brother Tijl, who was also a professional cyclist, was killed in August 2023 in a training incident.

== Major results ==
2016
2nd Grote Prijs Stad Sint-Niklaas
2017
1st Stage 2 Ronde van Midden-Nederland
2018
Course de Solidarność et des Champions Olympiques

1st Stages 2 & 4

2nd Schaal Sels
2nd Grand Prix Criquielion
3rd Grand Prix de la Ville de Lillers
10th Grand Prix de la ville de Pérenchies
2019
3rd Grote Prijs Marcel Kint
8th Ronde van Limburg
