= Jacob de Decker =

Dutch Golden Age painter

Giacomo, or Jacob de Decker (1640 – 1680), was a Dutch Golden Age painter.

== Biography ==
Decker was born in 1640 in Haarlem.

According to Houbraken he travelled to Rome and joined the bentvueghels with the bentname Gulden Regen. He signed Abraham Genoels bentbrief on 3 January 1675.

According to the RKD he may have been the son of the Haarlem landscape painter Cornelis Gerritsz Decker. He is known in Haarlem for his illustrations for Petrus Scriverius.

He died at Rome in 1680.
