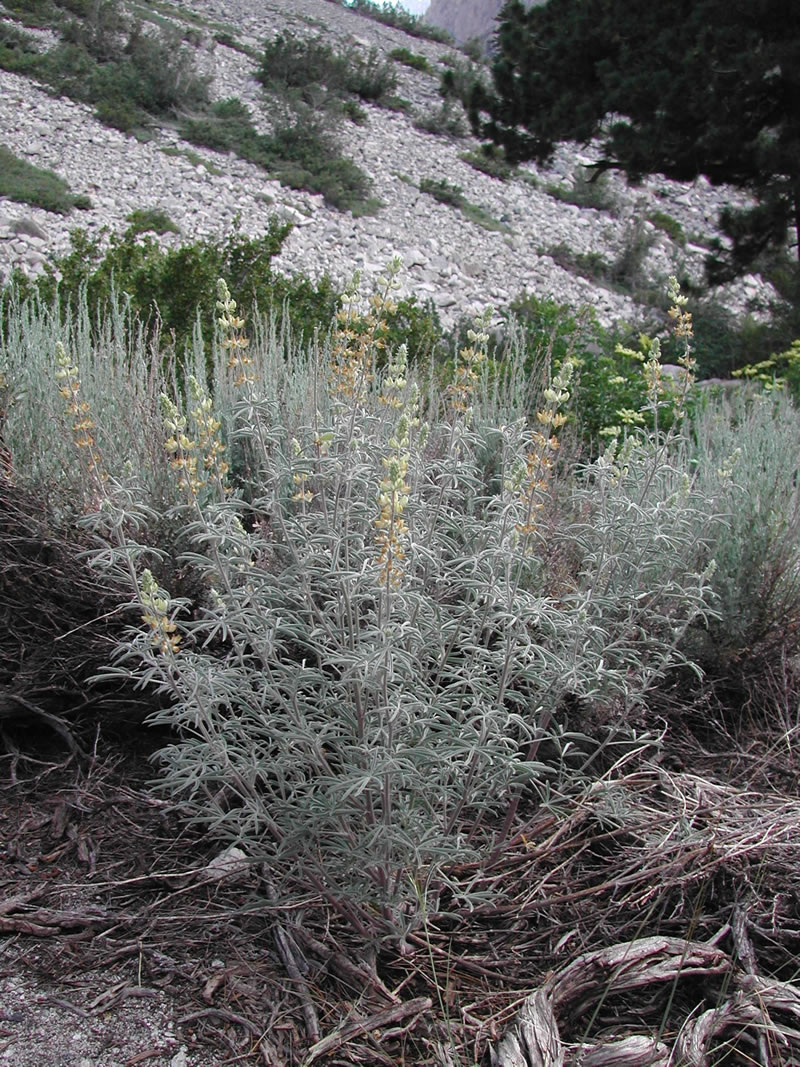

Conservation status
- Imperiled (NatureServe)

Scientific classification
- Kingdom: Plantae
- Clade: Tracheophytes
- Clade: Angiosperms
- Clade: Eudicots
- Clade: Rosids
- Order: Fabales
- Family: Fabaceae
- Subfamily: Faboideae
- Genus: Lupinus
- Species: L. padre-crowleyi

Binomial name
- Lupinus padre-crowleyi C.P.Sm.

Synonyms
- Lupinus dedeckerae

= Lupinus padre-crowleyi =

Species of legume, classified 1945

Lupinus padre-crowleyi is a rare species of lupine known by the common names Father Crowley's lupine and DeDecker's lupine. It is endemic to California, where it is known only from the eastern slopes of the Sierra Nevada and the high plateau below along the western border of Inyo County. It grows in the granite soils of the mountain forests and scrub. It has been noted at fewer than 20 locations. This is a perennial herb growing an erect inflorescence from a mat of silvery, woolly-haired herbage, reaching maximum heights over half a meter. Each palmate leaf is made up of 6 to 9 leaflets up to 7.5 centimeters long. The inflorescence is a raceme of whorled flowers each just over a centimeter long. The flower is cream to pale brownish yellow in color. The fruit is a silky-haired legume pod containing black-mottled white seeds.

This lupine was described to science in 1945 by Charles Piper Smith (C.P.Sm.), honoring local writer Fr. John J. Crowley, then unknowingly described again in 1969 by Philip A. Munz and David B. Dunn (Munz & Dunn) as Lupinus dedeckerae, honoring plant collector Mary DeDecker; the mix-up was sorted in the 1970s, with the original Lupinus padre-crowleyi (Father Crowley's lupine) confirmed as the true official name, while Lupinus dedeckerae is credited as a later synonym.
