= Tijl De Decker =

Belgian cyclist (2001–2023)

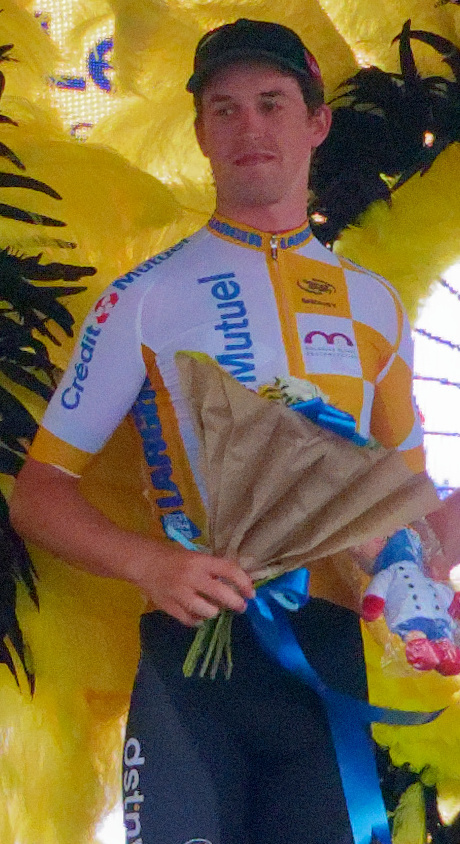
- De Decker in 2023

Personal information
- Born: 29 July 2001 Antwerp, Belgium
- Died: 25 August 2023 (aged 22) Antwerp, Belgium
- Height: 183 cm (6 ft 0 in)
- Weight: 73 kg (161 lb)

Cycling career
- Sport: Cycling
- Discipline: Road
- Role: Rider

Amateur teams
- 2018: Davo CT–Tongeren Junior
- 2019: Zannata Galloo Cycling Team
- 2020: Indulek–Doltcini–Derito CT
- 2021–2022: ACROG–Tormans

Professional team
- 2023: Lotto–Dstny Development Team

Tijl De Decker (29 July 2001 – 25 August 2023) was a Belgian racing cyclist. He was the younger brother of cyclist Alfdan De Decker.

== Sporting career ==
After switching to the U23s, De Decker first rode for three years for Belgian clubs. For the 2023 season he became a member of the Lotto–Dstny Development Team. Already in the first race for his new team he achieved his first victory in a UCI race by winning the third stage of the Tour de Taiwan. This was followed in April by the prestigious victory in the Paris–Roubaix Espoirs. At the Giro Next Gen, he was one of 24 riders disqualified by the jury who determined that the riders had been pulled by escort motorcycles or cars on the final climb up to the Stelvio Pass.

In July 2023, it was announced that De Decker would move from the development team to Lotto–Dstny's UCI ProTeam for the 2024 season.

On 25 August 2023, he died at Antwerp University Hospital from injuries as a result of a training accident in which he collided with the rear of a car in Lier near Antwerp two days earlier. He was 22.

== Major results ==
2018
2nd Omloop der Vlaamse Gewesten
8th Johan Museeuw Classic
2023
1st Paris–Roubaix Espoirs
1st Stage 3 Tour de Taiwan
1st Stage 1 (TTT) Tour Alsace
2nd Rutland–Melton CiCLE Classic
3rd Brussel-Opwijk
4th Road race, National Under-23 Road Championships
4th Omloop Het Nieuwsblad U23
4th Eschborn–Frankfurt Under-23
