= A. G. Mojtabai =

American novelist (born 1937)

Ann Grace Mojtabai (born Ann Grace Alpher) is an American novelist born in Brooklyn in 1937. She was educated, in philosophy as well as other subjects, at Antioch College and Columbia University.

Her works include several novels, such as Mundome, Parts of a World, and Thirst, as well as Soon, a book of short stories, and Blessèd Assurance: At Home with the Bomb in Amarillo, a work of nonfiction concerned with the threat of nuclear war.

She has spent many years abroad in such cities as Tehran, Karachi, and Lahore. She currently lives in Amarillo.

In 1980, she was awarded a Guggenheim Fellowship in Fiction.

== Selected works ==
- Mojtabai, A. G. (1974). Mundome. New York: Simon & Schuster. ISBN 0671217313.
- Mojtabai, A. G. (1976). The 400 Eels of Sigmund Freud. Simon & Schuster. ISBN 0671222481.
- Mojtabai, A. G. (1979). A Stopping Place. Simon & Schuster. ISBN 0671230832.
- Mojtabai, A. G. (1982). Autumn. Houghton Mifflin Harcourt. ISBN 0395320518.
- Mojtabai, A. G. (1986). Blessèd Assurance: At Home with the Bomb in Amarillo, Texas. Houghton Mifflin Harcourt. ISBN 0815605080.
- Mojtabai, A. G. (1989). Ordinary Time. Doubleday. ISBN 038526416X.
- Mojtabai, A. G. (1994). Called Out. Nan A. Talese. ISBN 038547430X.
- Mojtabai, A. G. (1998). Soon. Zoland Books. ISBN 0944072917.
- Mojtabai, A. G. (2000). "A Writer and Religion: Musings, Interrogations, Avowals". In Gass, William H.; Cuoco, Lorin (eds.). The Writer and Religion. Southern Illinois University Press. ISBN 0809323168.
- Mojtabai, A. G. (2008). All That Road Going. TriQuarterly. ISBN 9780810152007.
- Mojtabai, A. G. (2011). Parts of a World. TriQuarterly. ISBN 978-0810127661.
- Mojtabai, A. G. (2016). Shine on Me. TriQuarterly. ISBN 978-0810134171.
- Mojtabai, A. G. (2021). Thirst. Slant Books. ISBN 9781639820887.
