= Hendrik Adriaan Christiaan Dekker =

Dutch painter and lithographer

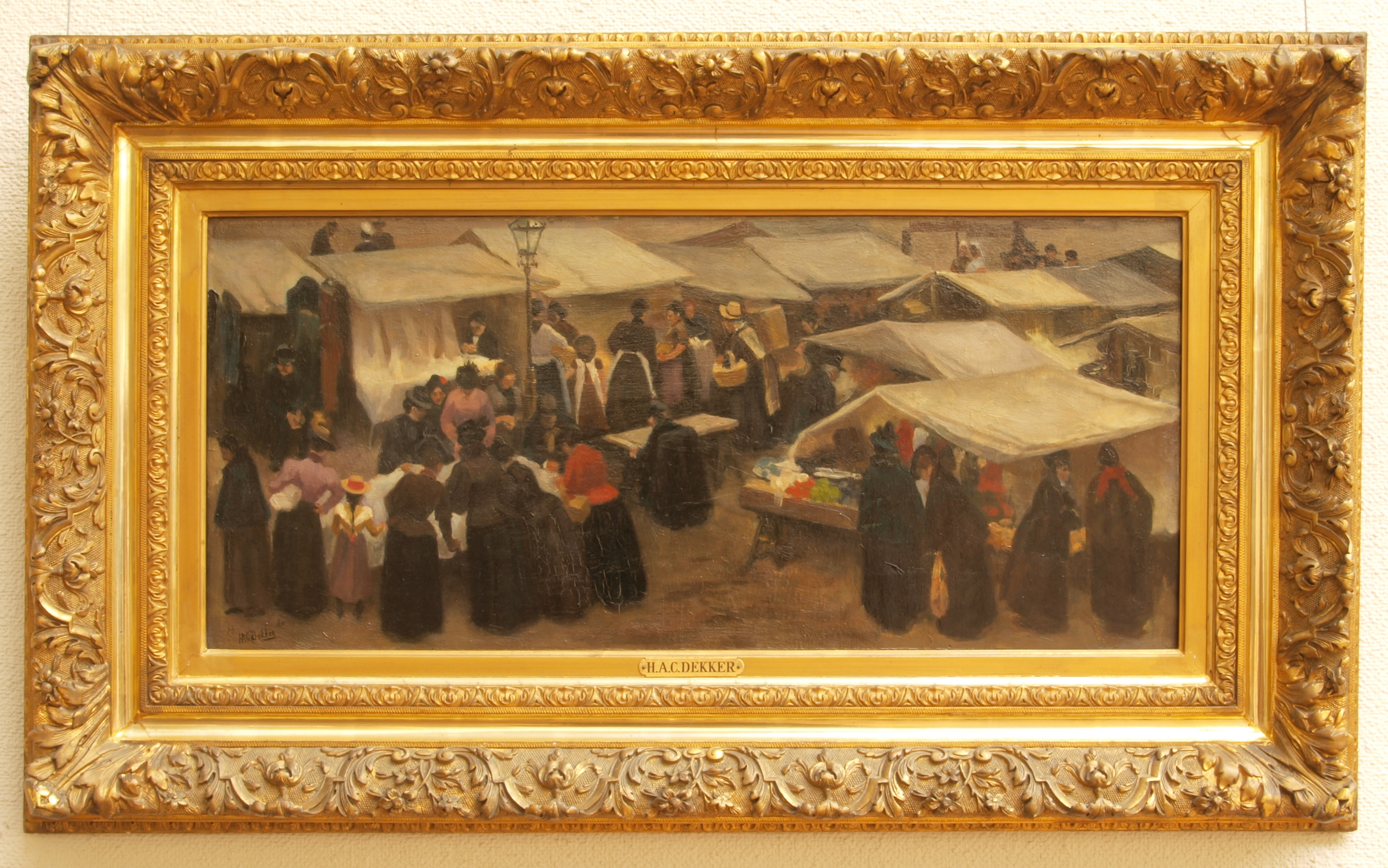
Nieuwmarkt in Amsterdam, c. 1897, collection Teylers Museum

Hendrik Adriaan Christiaan Dekker (1836, Amsterdam – 1905, Rheden) was a 19th-century Dutch painter and lithographer.

== Biography ==
Dekker was a pupil of Charles Rochussen for painting and Johann Wilhelm Kaiser for engraving at the Rijksakademie van beeldende kunsten in Amsterdam. He was a member of the Pulchri studio and called himself Hein, but signed his works HAC Dekker. He made lithographs after Jozef Israëls.
