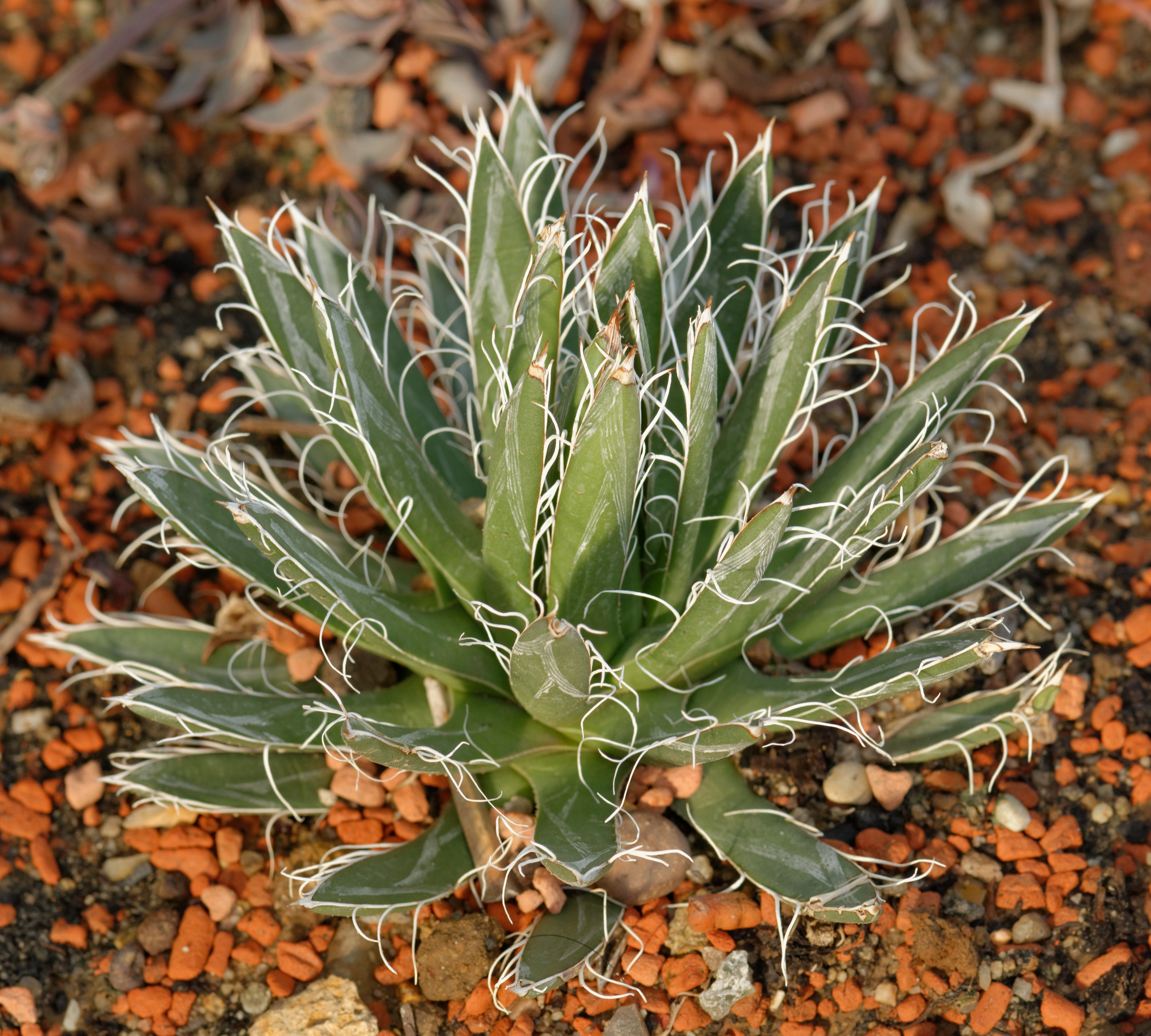

Conservation status
- Least Concern (IUCN 3.1)

- Vulnerable (NatureServe)

Scientific classification
- Kingdom: Plantae
- Clade: Tracheophytes
- Clade: Angiosperms
- Clade: Monocots
- Order: Asparagales
- Family: Asparagaceae
- Subfamily: Agavoideae
- Genus: Agave
- Species: A. toumeyana

Binomial name
- Agave toumeyana Trel.

= Agave toumeyana =

Species of flowering plant

Agave toumeyana is a plant species endemic to central Arizona.

The species forms dense clumps of rosettes, rarely more than 50 cm high. Flowering stalks can reach 3 meters, bearing greenish-white flowers. The plant was named in honor of James W. Toumey.
