= Thijs Dekker =

Dutch footballer (born 1997)

Personal information
- Date of birth: 31 January 1997 (age 29)
- Place of birth: Deventer, Netherlands
- Height: 1.83 m (6 ft 0 in)
- Position: Midfielder

Youth career
- SV Colmschate '33
- SV Schalkhaar
- 2014–2016: Go Ahead Eagles

Senior career*
Years	Team	Apps	(Gls)
2016–2018	Go Ahead Eagles	9	(1)
2019–2021	WHC Wezep		
2021–2023	SC Genemuiden		
2023–2024	WHC Wezep		
Total		9+	(1+)
- * Club domestic league appearances and goals

Thijs Dekker (born 31 January 1997) is a Dutch former professional footballer who played for Go Ahead Eagles, as a midfielder.

== Career ==
Dekker played for the youth teams of Colmschate, Schalkaar and Go Ahead Eagles. In 2017–2018, already on a professional contract, he played nine games on the team. Initially a bencher, he made his debut on 29 January 2018 against MVV Maastricht. Dekker left Go Ahead on 1 September 2018 where his contract was terminated by mutual consent.

On 18 January 2019 Dekker signed with WHC Wezep. In 2021, he changed to Hoofdklasse-side SC Genemuiden. In 2023 he left Genemuiden. He returned to Wezep for the 2023–24 season.
