= Frederik van Leenhof =

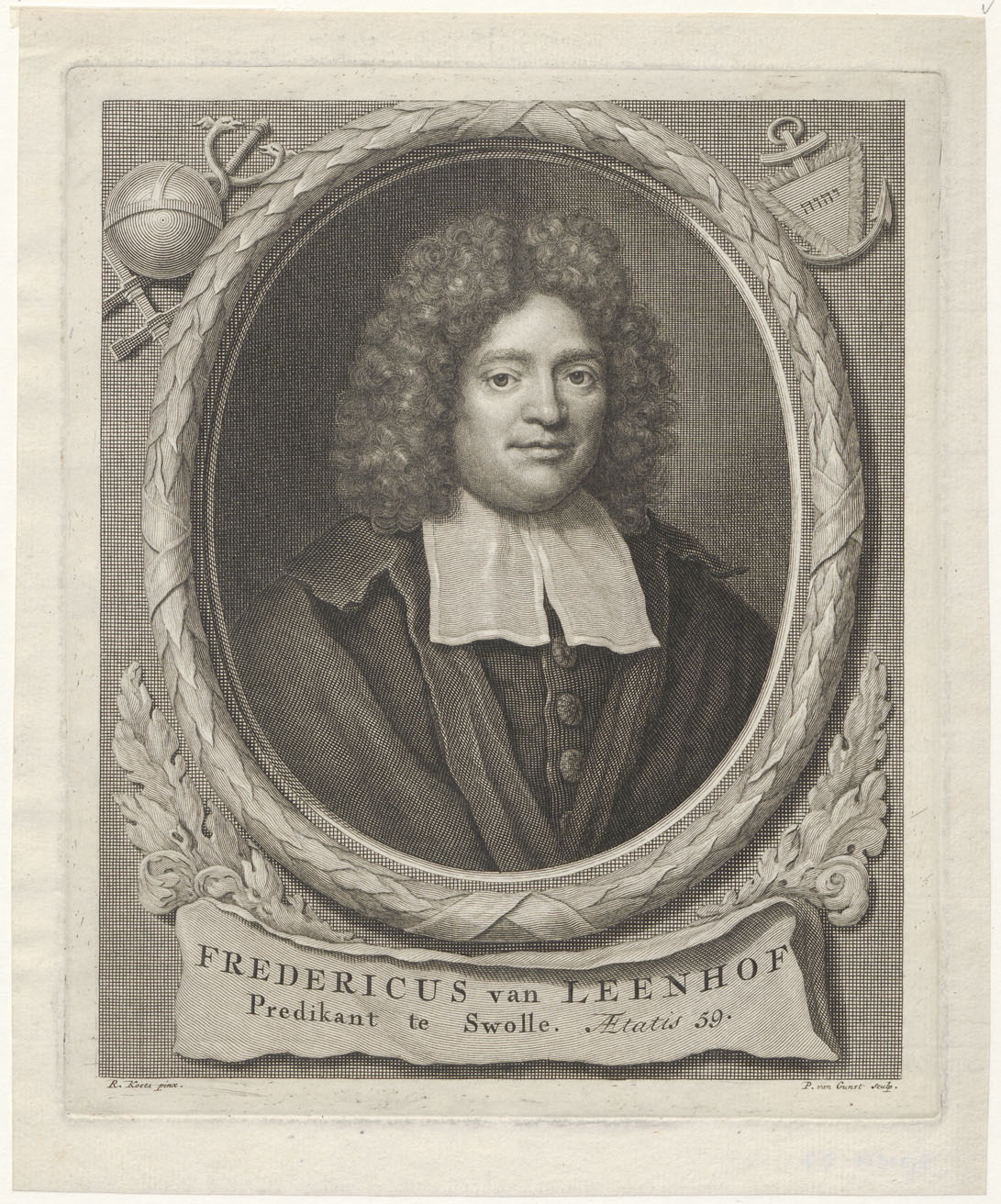
- Portrait from 1709. Engraving by P. van Gunst.
- Born: 1 September 1647; Middelburg, Netherlands
- Died: 13 October 1715 (aged 68); Zwolle, Netherlands
- Occupations: Pastor, philosopher

Philosophical work
- School: Cocceianism, Spinozism
- Main interests: Ethics, theology

Frederik van Leenhof (1 September 1647 – 13 October 1715) was a Dutch pastor and philosopher active in Zwolle, who caused an international controversy because of his Spinozist work Heaven on Earth (1703). This controversy is extensively discussed in Jonathan Israel's 2001 book Radical Enlightenment.

== Education and career ==
Leenhof studied theology in the 1660s at Utrecht University under Voetius, and at Leiden University under Cocceius during the Voetian–Cocceian dispute. He served as pastor in Abbeville (1670–71), Nieuwvliet (1672–78) and Velsen (1680–81), before finally settling in Zwolle in 1681. During his first period of writing from 1673 until 1684, he fervently chose the side of the Cartesio-Cocceians against Voetian fundamentalism. He accused his opponents of smear tactics and straw men, denying the claim 'that out of Descartes's school come atheists and libertines'. However, a letter correspondence with Christopher Wittich (briefly his host in Leiden shortly before 1681), in which Leenhof defended Baruch Spinoza's views on substance and creation, was published after Wittich's death in 1687 without Leenhof's permission under the name Anti-Spinoza. When pressed, he admitted having written them, so by 1681 Leenhof must have already been familiar with Spinoza's thought, and accepted important core concepts of it. His 1684 work Keten der Bybelsche Godgeleerdheit ("Chain of Biblical Theology") was later found to contain typically Spinozist views.

In his correspondence with Wittich, Leenhof argues that the universe must always have existed; a creation ex nihilo would violate God's perfect nature. Also, a pure spirit could not logically create substance, therefore God must be one with or present in the physical world, claimed Leenhof, rejecting dualism.

Whilst studying his religion and exploring modern ethics during his second period of writing (1700–04), Leenhof came into contact with the early Enlightenment, which originated in the Dutch Republic around 1650. Amongst other things, he tried to formulate a Stoic and Epicurean system of ethics, with no role for Christian salvation, in his 1700 work Prediker ("Preacher"). Politically, it advocates the rejection of monarchy ("without doubt the most imperfect [rule]") and aristocracy, and argues for a republican form of government instead. Hereditary succession is worthless; only reason provides legitimacy, and true sovereignty is the common good of the community. Royal standing armies of mercenaries are to be abolished, lest they be used to oppress the king's subjects; instead, the state should train its citizens and form a militia to be able to defend the common good. Leenhof also opined that morals are universal, and knowable through the use of reason.

== The Leenhof controversy ==
In agreement with Baruch Spinoza (1632–77), Leenhof eventually came to reject belief in a personal god, which was considered heresy in contemporary Christendom. Leenhof's book Heaven on Earth, published simultaneously in Zwolle and Amsterdam in June 1703, is written completely in Spinozist (pantheist) thought, although he always denied being an adherent of the then hugely controversial Spinoza. In fact, the book did not 'refer explicitly to any forbidden philosopher or doctrine', but the unorthodox way in which he presented his ideas, one after the other, almost devoid of any Christian context, caused uproar amongst his readers.

=== Contents of Heaven on Earth ===
Noble truth fails to triumph in the world and ignorance and superstition prevail. Everywhere one encounters false ideas, such as that comets are portents of pending doom, that there are ghosts and demons, and that gold can be obtained through alchemy.

— Frederik van Leenhof, Heaven on Earth

Leenhof opined that every human being could realise heaven on Earth, by judging the world according to "God's order" (=nature), expressed in the laws of nature, and by reading the gospel. He claimed on linguistic grounds that what Scripture means by 'heaven' and 'hell' are not places or locations, but states of mind. The former is attained when one acquires knowledge of God, which results in a state of stable, enduring happiness. 'Hell' is the feeling when a person does not have adequate knowledge of God, and is therefore unhappy; it is not a physical, divine punishment for sin, but mental suffering that they should try to avoid. The eradication of false ideas and superstitions, such as belief in witches, spirits and ghosts, is a precondition for peace of mind and joy. To achieve this, authorities need to implement a policy of freedom of thought, toleration of other people's (non)religious and philosophical views, and the freedom to express and discuss those opinions without taboo, which will allow the common people to emancipate and enlighten themselves from their ignorance.

=== Heaven on Earth attacked and defended ===
His book was hotly debated by the Zwolle government and the States of Overijssel for quite some time, whilst both Voetians and Cocceians demanded Leenhof to retract it, because it did not refer to God as the saviour, to the Christian faith or revelation. Writings suggest the controversial book was a hot topic amongst common people, remarking that only few had not heard about it. Although a handful of laymen warmly welcomed it, the entire theological, ecclesiastical and political establishment condemned it, and not one of his former Cocceian colleagues defended him. However, an unknown Spinozist by the mysterious pseudonym of "E. D. M." wrote a scathing critique of Leenhof's detractors, titled Redenkundige Aanmerkingen ("Rhetorical Remarks"). It alleges many of the attacks on Leenhof's work are nothing more than attempts to compare it to anything Spinoza wrote and condemn it for that reason, whilst showing even declared anti-Spinozists have adopted some of his ideas. Leenhof's greatest critic, Taco Hajo van den Honert, accused both him and his publisher Barend Hakvoord (also precentor at St. Michael's Church in Zwolle) of having written it, which they denied. During the ongoing controversy about his book, Leenhof often defended himself in writing against numerous accusations concerning his book (the most notable being Hemel op Aarde Opgehelderd, "Heaven on Earth Clarified", or simply Opheldering or "Clarification").

=== Secular versus religious authorities ===
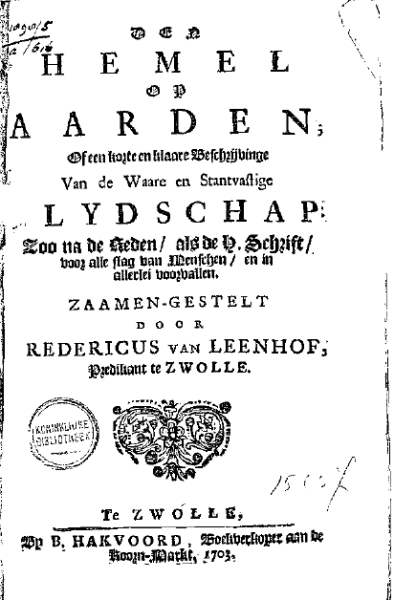
Heaven on Earth (1703), that stirred up religious debate across Europe.

On 20 March 1704, Leenhof took the initiative to convene the Zwolle church council to ask his colleagues' support, and declared that nothing he had written contradicted the teachings of the dominant Dutch Reformed Church, the Confessio Belgica, which he acknowledged were the true path to Salvation, and formally declared that 'I reject whatever is harmful, directly or indirectly, to our teaching in the writings of Spinoza or others'. The consistory backed Leenhof, but the regional classis did not and called for his suspension. Here the burgomasters of Zwolle intervened that nobody from outside the city could decide who could or could not preach what without even having consulted the magistrate, resulting in a great conflict between secular and religious authorities. In May, it reached the provincial level, with Synod of Overijssel claiming Heaven on Earth was full of the "soul-destroying ideas in the writings of the damned atheist Spinoza" that the States General had previously forbidden because of their "godlessness", whilst the States of Overijssel stood by the burgomasters of Zwolle. Next, the controversy spread to Frisia, Guelders (in August) and especially Holland, whose synods all condemned Leenhof's work as basically a refurbishment of Spinoza. Then Anthonie Heinsius, Grand Pensionary of Holland (the de facto head of state of the Dutch Republic during the Second Stadtholderless Period), called for a ban on Heaven on Earth and Leenhof's later defences, arguing the denial of the true religion would also undermine the State.

=== Articles of Satisfaction ===
Meanwhile, the Zwolle consistory drafted, with Leenhof's help, the ten Articles of Satisfaction, published in August 1704, clarifying that his thought differed from Spinozism, that is to be utterly condemned for its incongruity with Christianity. The Articles were ratified unanimously by the consistory and government of Zwolle, and proclaimed from the pulpits of the city's largest three churches on the first Sunday of November. Again, this failed to placate his critics. The States and Synods outside of Overijssel continued to pressure Zwolle to condemn and ban Leenhof's 'Spinozistic' last three books, which the States of Holland imposed in their own province on 18 December 1706. During a meeting of the States General on 29 December 1706, the other provinces urged Overijssel to impose a similar ban on the books, but the delegates of Overijssel responded that 'this would only provide further encouragement to read them', and stressed their province's autonomy in the matter. In 1708, the Synod of Overijssel called for Leenhof to be fired and excommunicated from the Reformed Church, lest his views led his congregation and others astray, and discussed tighter controls against 'licentious books' in general. The call of censorship of radical writings was echoed by religious and sometimes secular authorities in other provinces as well, although the regenten feared this would strengthen the Church's power at their disadvantage. Sanctions against Zwolle were imposed by several provincial synods in 1708, including that of North Holland and Guelders that no preacher from Zwolle could participate in any church gathering in their regions. Finally, the deadlock in the States of Overijssel was resolved in March 1709, when the majority ruled against the wish of Zwolle that Leenhof had to sign additional Articles of Satisfaction drafted by the synod to utterly repudiate Spinozism. At a synod and States' commissioners' meeting in Deventer in June 1709, Leenhof defiantly denied having ever taught Spinozism, but only orthodoxy, and that he could not retract more than he had already done, and not recant his last three books. After this, Leenhof's books were banned in Overijssel, but the Zwolle magistrate refused to strip him from his pastoral position. In December 1710, they finally requested him to resign, which Leenhof did. However, he remained a popular figure within Zwolle, receiving both salary and sacraments and retaining his preacher's seat in church. His still favoured position led to continued debates and harsh words around the country against the consistory and magistrate of Zwolle. Eventually, a majority in the consistory of Zwolle voted to excommunicate Leenhof in 1712.

=== Outside of the Netherlands ===
Although discharged honourably from his pastoral position in 1710, and excommunicated disgracefully in 1712, Leenhof's ideas spread far and wide. Heaven on Earth was translated in many languages and spread all across Europe, via Germany along the Baltic Sea cities into the Baltic states, Italy, Spain and Portugal.

== Works ==
- 1678–1682: Keten der Bybelsche Godgeleerdheit ("Chain of Biblical Theology"), 2 volumes.
- 1700: Prediker ("Preacher". Original title: De Prediker van den wijzen en magtigen Konink Salomon: Kort en leerzamelijk verklaart, en op onze tijden en zeden toegepast, "The Preacher of the Wise and Mighty King Solomon: Explained Briefly and Informatively, and Applied to Our Times and Ethics.").
- 1703: Hemel op aarde ("Heaven on Earth". Original title: Den hemel op aarden; of een korte en klaare beschrijvinge van de waare en stantvastige blydschap, "Heaven on Earth; or a Short and Clear Description of True and Steadfast Happiness").
  - 1704: Hemel op Aarde Opgehelderd, "Heaven on Earth Clarified", better known as Opheldering or "Clarification".
  - 1704: Kort Antwoord, "Short Answer".

== Literature ==
- Israel, Jonathan (2001). "Leenhof and the 'Universal Philosophical Religion'". Radical Enlightenment. Philosophy and the Making of Modernity 1650–1750. Oxford University Press. pp. 406–436. ISBN 9780191622878.
- "Biographical data Frederik van Leenhof". Poortmans repertorium. National Library of the Netherlands.
