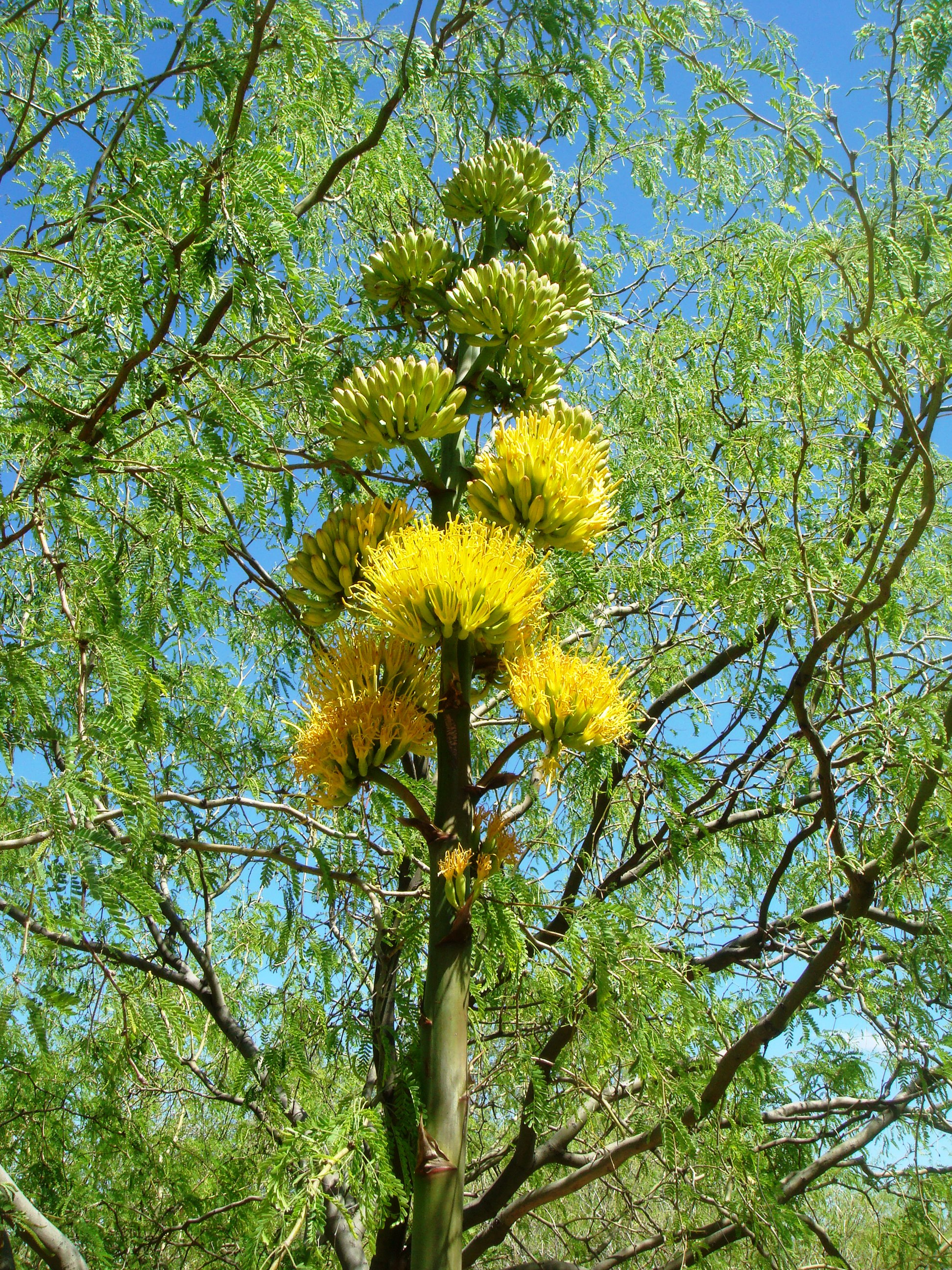

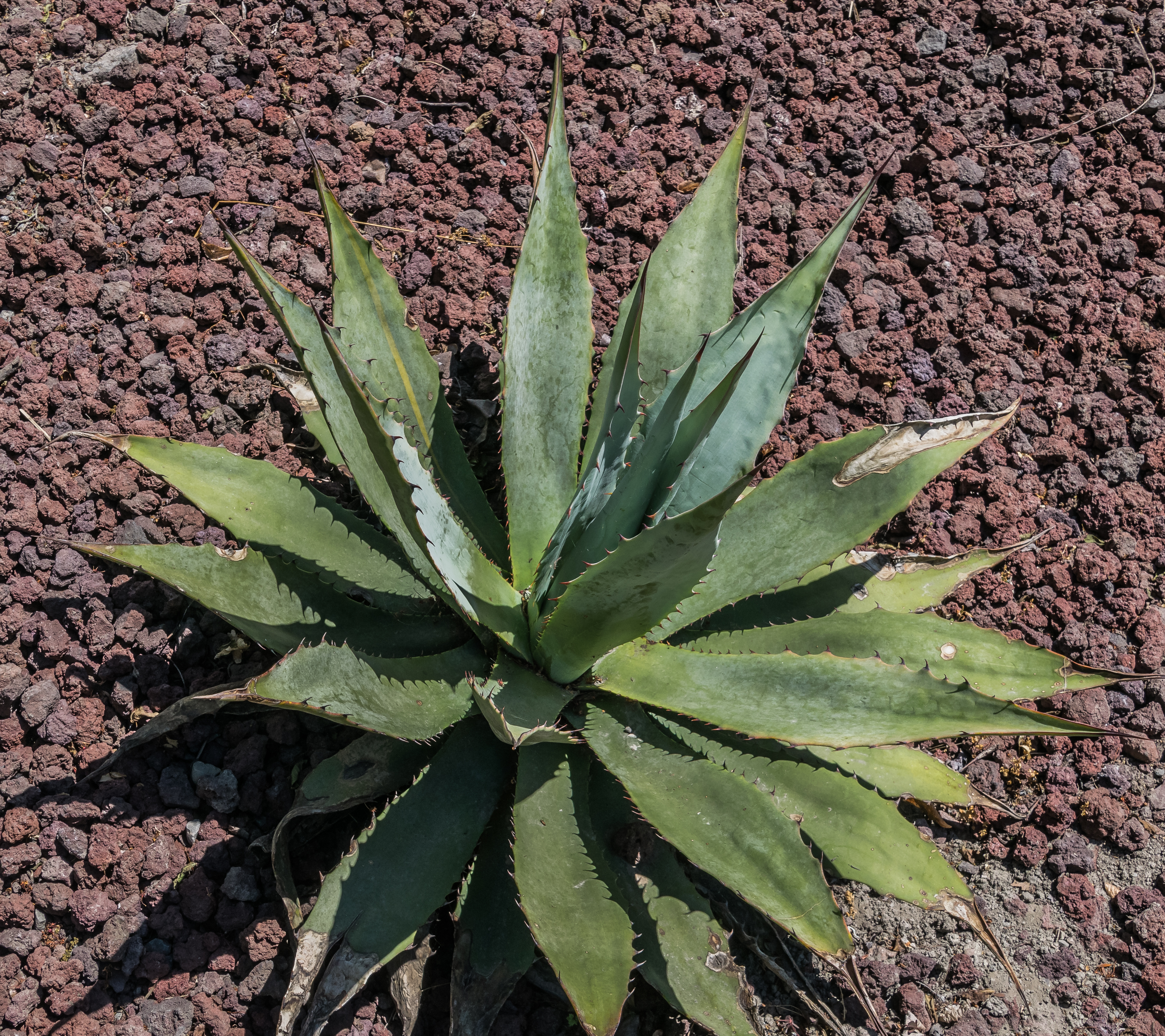

Conservation status
- Least Concern (IUCN 3.1)

- Apparently Secure (NatureServe)

Scientific classification
- Kingdom: Plantae
- Clade: Tracheophytes
- Clade: Angiosperms
- Clade: Monocots
- Order: Asparagales
- Family: Asparagaceae
- Subfamily: Agavoideae
- Genus: Agave
- Species: A. chrysantha

Binomial name
- Agave chrysantha Peebles

Synonyms
- Agave palmeri subsp. chrysantha (Peebles) B.Ullrich; Agave palmeri var. chrysantha (Peebles) Little

= Agave chrysantha =

Species of flowering plant

Agave chrysantha, the golden-flowered century plant, is a plant species endemic to Arizona. The species is distinguished by its bright yellow flowers, born on a flowering stalk up to 7 m (21 feet) tall.
