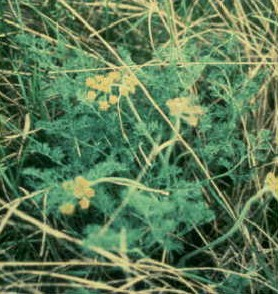

Conservation status
- Secure (NatureServe)

Scientific classification
- Kingdom: Plantae
- Clade: Embryophytes
- Clade: Tracheophytes
- Clade: Spermatophytes
- Clade: Angiosperms
- Clade: Eudicots
- Clade: Asterids
- Order: Apiales
- Family: Apiaceae
- Genus: Lomatium
- Species: L. foeniculaceum

Binomial name
- Lomatium foeniculaceum (Nutt.) J.M.Coult. & Rose

= Lomatium foeniculaceum =

Species of flowering plant

Lomatium foeniculaceum is a species complex of flowering plants found in North America. L. foeneculicum is a member of the taxonomic family Apiaceae, making it a close relative of plants such as celery, carrot, parsley, and fennel, as well as the herbs dill, coriander, caraway, and cumin. Common names include Desert Biscuitroot as well as Carrotleaf Desert Parsley. Biscuitroot can also be used as a common name for the genus Lomatium as a whole.

== Description ==
Despite variations within the genus, members of the Lomatium clade have a generally similar structure; “All [Lomatium] have fern-like compound leaves with clasping petioles and numerous small white to yellowish flowers in umbrella-shaped inflorescences.”

L. foeneculicum are acaulescent, growing to heights of no more than 50 cm . The inflorescence is upright and is composed of yellow or occasionally purple flowers. Leaves are compound, and generally deltoid in shape. The leaflets are cleft, and intricately divided. Each rosette develops from a taproot which is deeply seated. This root structure allows the plant to survive extreme conditions and is the source of the plant's xerophytic capability.

== Distribution ==
L. foeniculaceum's range extends across a large portion of North America. Specimens have been reported in Canada from the provinces of British Columbia, Alberta, Saskatchewan, and Manitoba. In the continental United States, specimens have been recorded along the western border of Iowa and Missouri and in all states extending contiguously to the Pacific Ocean.

Specific geographic regions are associated with various subspecies of the L. foeniculaceum complex. An extreme example of this is the subspecies L. inyoense or the Inyo Mountains Parsley, a subspecies of L. foeneculcium that has been documented in only two California counties.

== Taxonomy ==
L. foeniculaceum belongs to the Pereneial Endemic North American (PENA) clade of Apiaceae within the subfamily Apioideae. Within the lomatium genera, there are roughly 106 recognized species.

DNA samples from L. foeniculacuem populations have revealed several distinct subspecies, leading to the identification of a species complex that contains five subspecies, one of which comprises two varieties. The complex contains the following members: Lomatium foeniculaceum var. foeniculaceum, Lomatium foeniculaceum var. daucifolium, Lomatium foeniculaceum subspecies fimbriatum, Lomatium foeniculaceum subspecies macdougalii, Lomatium foeniculaceum subspecies semivaginatum, Lomatium foeniculaceum subspecies inyoense.

Subspecies or variety.	U.S. States and Canadian provinces from which specimens have been recovered.	Image Link
L. foeniculaceum, variety foeniculaceum.	British Columbia, Alberta, Manitoba, Saskatchewan, Colorado, Iowa, Kansas, Missouri, Montana, North Dakota, South Dakota, Nebraska, Oklahoma, Texas and Wyoming.	var. foeniculaceum.
L. foeniculaceum, variety daucifolium.	Kansas, Missouri, Nebraska, Oklahoma, and Texas.	var. daucifolium.
Lomatium foeniculaceum, subspecies fimbriatum. This ssp may also be referred to as the Fringe Desert Parsley.	California, Nevada, Oregon, and Utah.	ssp. fimbriatum
Lomatium foeniculaceum, subspecies macdougalii.	Arizona, California, Colorado, Idaho, Montana, Nevada, New Mexico, Oregon, Utah, Washington, and Wyoming.	ssp macdougalii ssp macdougalii
Lomatium foeniculaceum, subspecies semivaginatum.	Idaho, Montana, Oregon.	na
Lomatium foeniculaceum, subspecies inyoense.	California.	ssp inyoense

Both L. foeniculaceum and L. daucifolium were previously recognized as subspecies, but have been reassigned to the variety level; the taxonomic designation below the level of subspecies. This taxonomic differentiation could point towards ongoing horizontal gene transfer, second contact, an incomplete speciation event, or hybridization.
