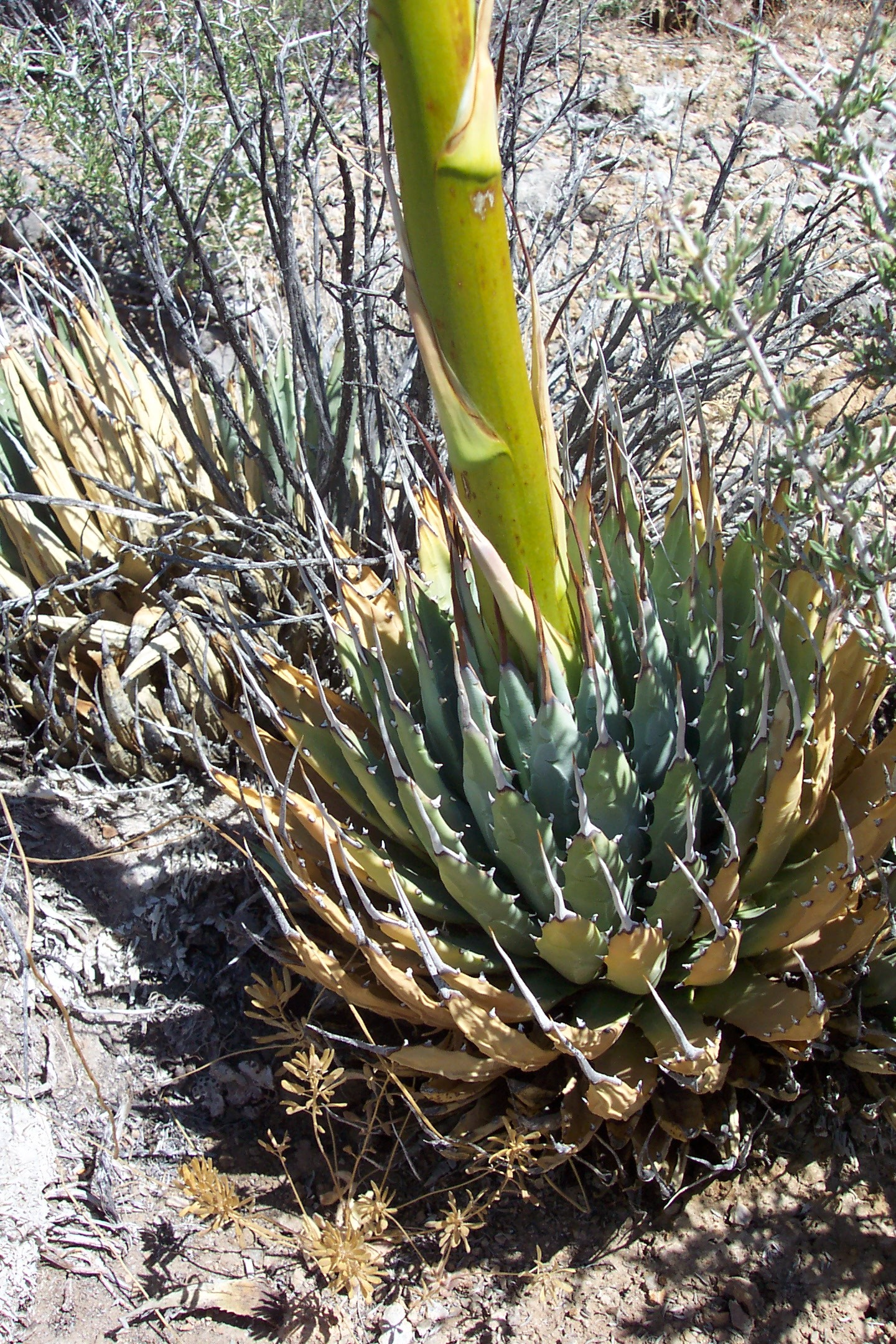

Conservation status
- Least Concern (IUCN 3.1)

- Apparently Secure (NatureServe)

Scientific classification
- Kingdom: Plantae
- Clade: Tracheophytes
- Clade: Angiosperms
- Clade: Monocots
- Order: Asparagales
- Family: Asparagaceae
- Subfamily: Agavoideae
- Genus: Agave
- Species: A. utahensis

Binomial name
- Agave utahensis Engelm.
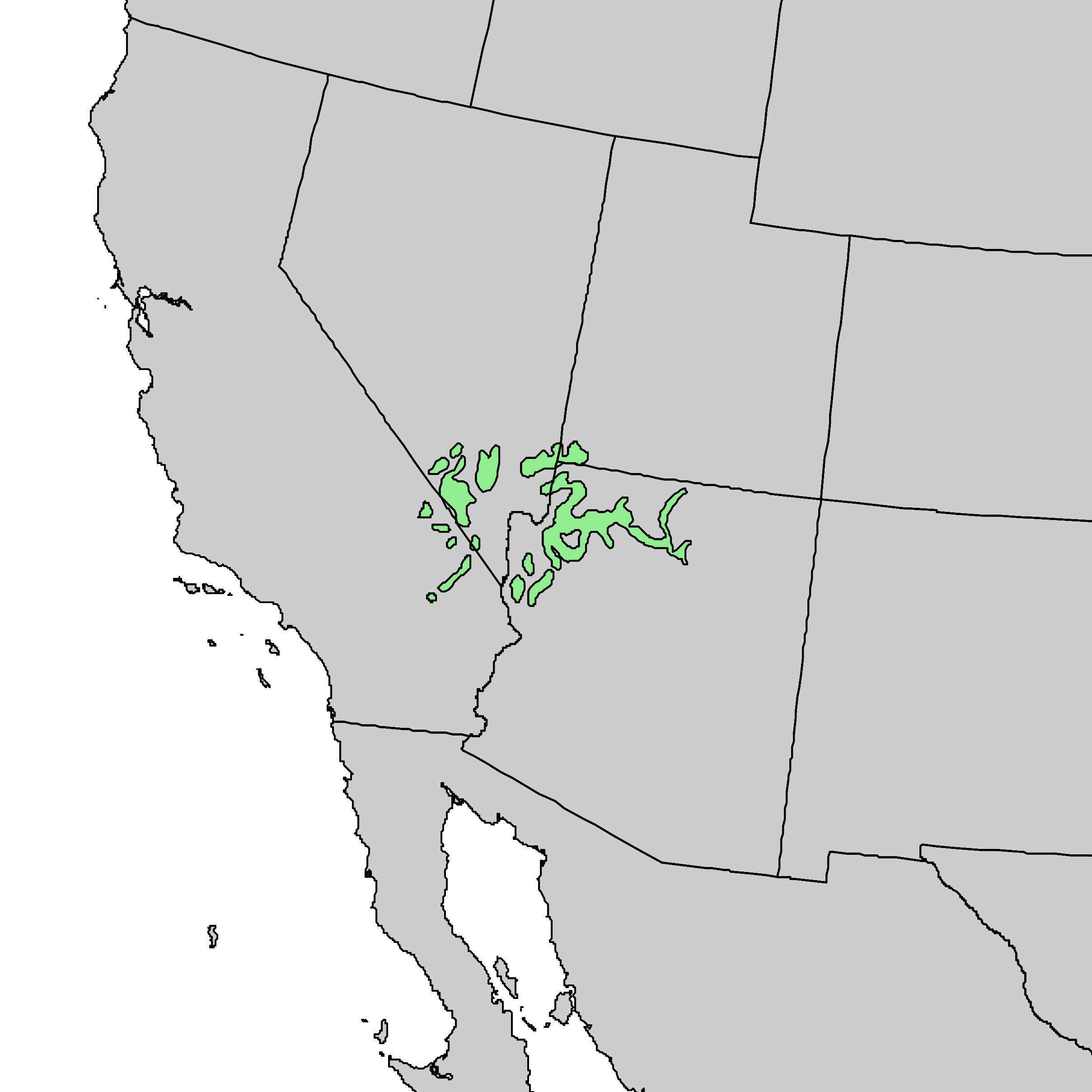
- Natural range of Agave utahensis

Synonyms
- Agave haynaldii var. utahensis (Engelm.) Terracciano; Agave newberryi Engelm.; Agave scaphoidea Greenm. & Ronst.; Agave utahensis var. discreta M.E.Jones; Agave utahensis var. scaphoidea M.E.Jones

= Agave utahensis =

Species of flowering plant

Agave utahensis is a species of agave known by the common name Utah agave.

Varieties of the species include the Nevada agave and Kaibab agave.

It is an uncommon plant of the United States' desert southwest, in the states of Utah, Nevada, Arizona, and California. Although plants in some areas are threatened, overall the species is stable and is considered to be of Least Concern by the IUCN.

== Description ==
Agave utahensis is a rosette-shaped agave having blue-green sharp-spiked leaves.

The raceme inflorescence is very tall, reaching a maximum of 4 m (12 ft). It is generally yellow or yellow-green with bulbous yellow flowers. The fruits are capsules 1 to 3 centimeters long and containing black seed.

Agave utahensis can grow in clonal colonies; a 2024 survey conducted in Nevada estimated that some colonies are more than 150 years old.

== Uses ==
Agave utahensis is cultivated as an ornamental plant. In the UK it has won the Royal Horticultural Society's Award of Garden Merit.

The plant was used for food and fiber by local Native American peoples such as the Havasupai. Among the Navajo, the plant is used to make blankets.
