= Jeremias de Dekker =

17th-century Dutch poet (1609–1666)

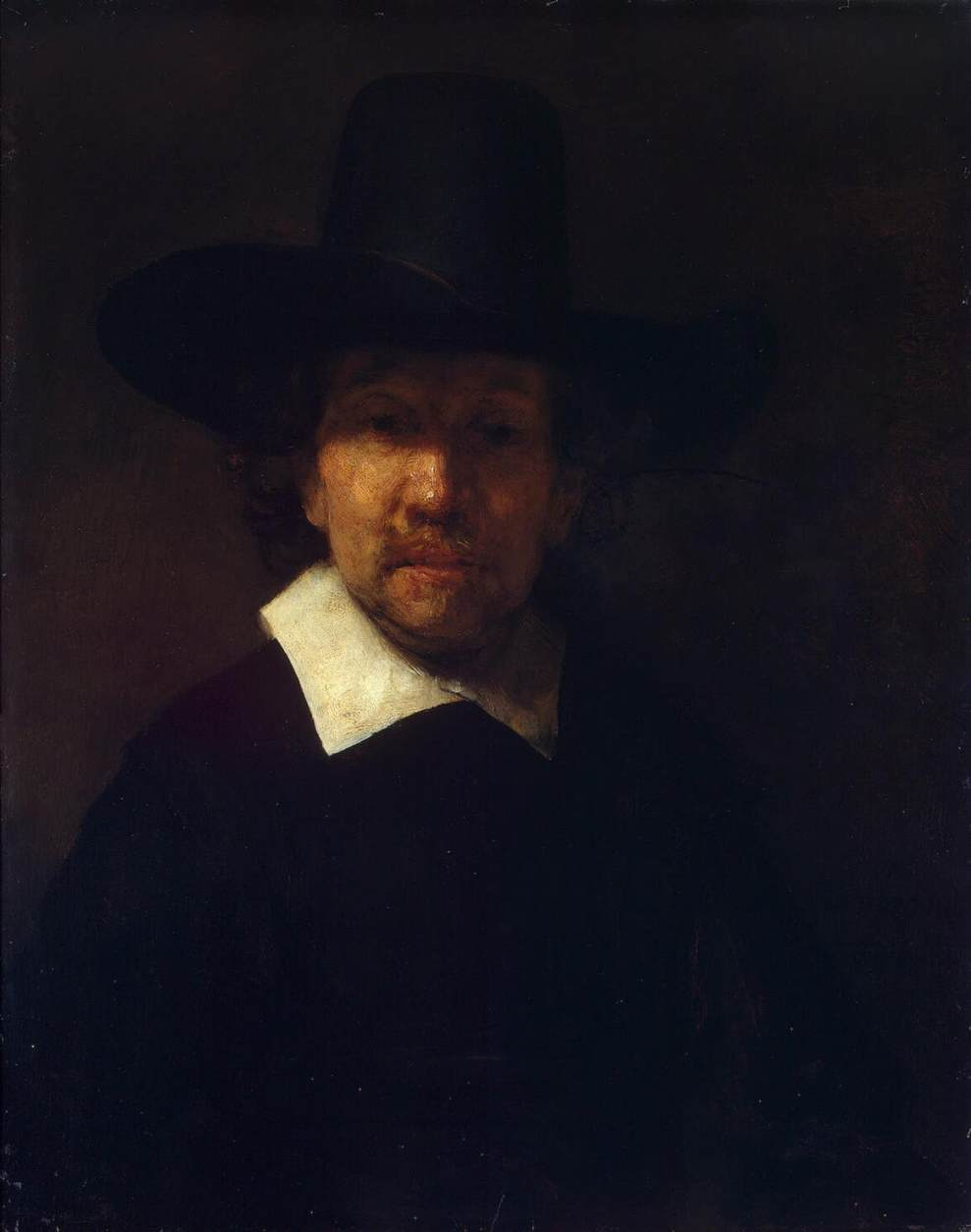
- Rembrandt: Portrait of Jeremias de Dekker
- Born: August 1609; Dordrecht, South Holland, Netherlands
- Died: November 1666 (aged 56–57); Amsterdam, North Holland, Netherlands
- Occupation: Poet

Jeremias de Dekker or Decker (August 1609 – November 1666) was a Dutch poet.

== Biography ==
Dekker was born in Dordrecht. His father was a native of Antwerp, who, having embraced the reformed religion, had been compelled to take refuge in the Netherlands. Entering his father's business at an early age, Jeremias found leisure to cultivate his taste for literature and especially for poetry, and to acquire without assistance a competent knowledge of English, French, Latin and Italian.

His first poem was a paraphrase of the Lamentations of Jeremiah (Klaagliedern van Jeremias), which was followed by translations and imitations of Horace, Juvenal and other Latin poets. The most important of his original poems were a collection of epigrams (Puntdichten) and a satire in praise of avarice (Lof der Geldzucht). The latter is his best-known work. Written in a vein of light and yet effective irony, it is usually ranked by critics along with Erasmus's Praise of Folly. Dekker died in Amsterdam in November 1666.

== Works ==
A complete collection of his poems, edited by Brouerius van Nideck, was published at Amsterdam in 1726 under the title Exercices poétiques (2 vols. 4to.). Selections from his poems are included in Siegenbeck's Proeven van nederduitsche Dichtkunde (1823), and from his epigrams in Geijsbeek's Epigrammatische Anthologie (1827).
