= Climacteric year =

In astrology, critical year in a person's life

In Ancient Greek philosophy and astrology, the climacterics (Latin: annus climactericus, from the Greek κλιμακτηρικός, klimaktērikós) were certain purportedly critical years in a person's life, marking turning points.

== Historic use ==
According to the astrologers, the person would see some very notable alterations to the body, and be at a great risk of death during these years. Authors on the subject include the following: Plato, Cicero, Macrobius, Aulus Gellius, among the ancients; as well as Argol, Maginus, and Salmasius. Augustine, Ambrose, Bede, and Boetius all countenanced the belief.

The first climacteric occurs in the seventh year of a person's life; the rest are multiples of the first, such as 21, 49, 56, and 63. The grand climacteric usually refers to the 63rd year, with the dangers here being supposedly more imminent; but may refer to the 49th (7 × 7) or the 81st (9 × 9).

The belief has a great deal of antiquity on its side. Aulus Gellius says that it was borrowed from the Chaldeans. Pythagoras, basing his philosophy (Pythagoreanism) on numbers, imagined an extraordinary virtue in the number 7.

These turning points were viewed as changes from one kind of life, and attitude toward life, to another in the mind of the subject: the locus classicus is Ptolemy, Tetrabiblos C204–207, which in turn gave rise to Shakespeare's delineation of the Seven Ages of Man.

They were also viewed, logically within the framework of ancient medicine and its ties to astrology, as dangerous years from a medical standpoint. In this sense, the word has been used by medicine of more recent times; in the 16th through the 18th centuries, it often refers to the day on which a fever was thought to break (see quartan fever, quintan fever).

Marsilius Ficinus gives a foundation for the belief: he states that there is a year assigned for each planet to rule over the body of man, each in his turn. Now, Saturn being the most malefic planet of all, every seventh year, which falls to his lot, becomes very dangerous; especially that of 63, since the person is already of old age.

Some hold, according to this doctrine, every seventh year to be an established climacteric; but others only allow the title to those years produced by the multiplication of the climacterical space by an odd number, 3, 5, 7, 9, etc. Others observe every ninth year as a climacteric, in which case the 81st year is the grand climacteric. Some also believed that the climacteric years are also fatal to political bodies and governments.

The Roman emperor Augustus refers to having passed his own grand climacteric, about which he had been apprehensive.

The astronomer Johannes Hevelius wrote a volume under the title Annus climactericus (1685), describing the loss he sustained in the burning of his observatory in 1679, which he considered climacteric because it was 49 years after the beginning of his observing career.

The legacy of these climacteric years is still with us to some extent: the age of reason is often taken to be when a child reaches 7, and in many countries the age of full adulthood is taken as 21.

For astrologers, the discovery of the planet Uranus in 1781 confirmed what may have originated as the mundane observations of the ancients on living things. Uranus has an orbital period of 84 years, which divides into four periods of 21 years each. Astrologers take Uranus as the bringer of abrupt changes, so when it forms a square or 90 degree relationship with its original position in a nativity at age 21, this brings the change from irresponsible youth to responsible adulthood. The opposition occurs at age 42, traditionally the time of midlife crisis. Thus the second square at age 63, the climacteric, would be the most dangerous for the ancients who rarely lived long enough to see the conjunction (return to the natal position) at age 84. This combination of the periods of Saturn and Uranus are powerful indicators of life changes for astrologers.
