= Eastern Sierra =

Eastern part of the Sierra Nevada

The Eastern Sierra is a region in California comprising the eastern side of the Sierra Nevada, which includes all of Mono and Inyo Counties and portions of other adjoining counties. The main thoroughfare is U.S. Route 395, which passes through Bridgeport, Lee Vining, Bishop, Big Pine, Independence, Lone Pine, and Olancha, with Bishop being the largest city in the area. It is sparsely populated but well known for its scenery; major points of interest include Mono Lake, Bodie, Mammoth Lakes, Manzanar, Mount Whitney and parts of Yosemite National Park, Sequoia National Park, Kings Canyon National Park, and Death Valley National Park. It is also home to rare and endangered species such as the sage grouse and the bristlecone pine.

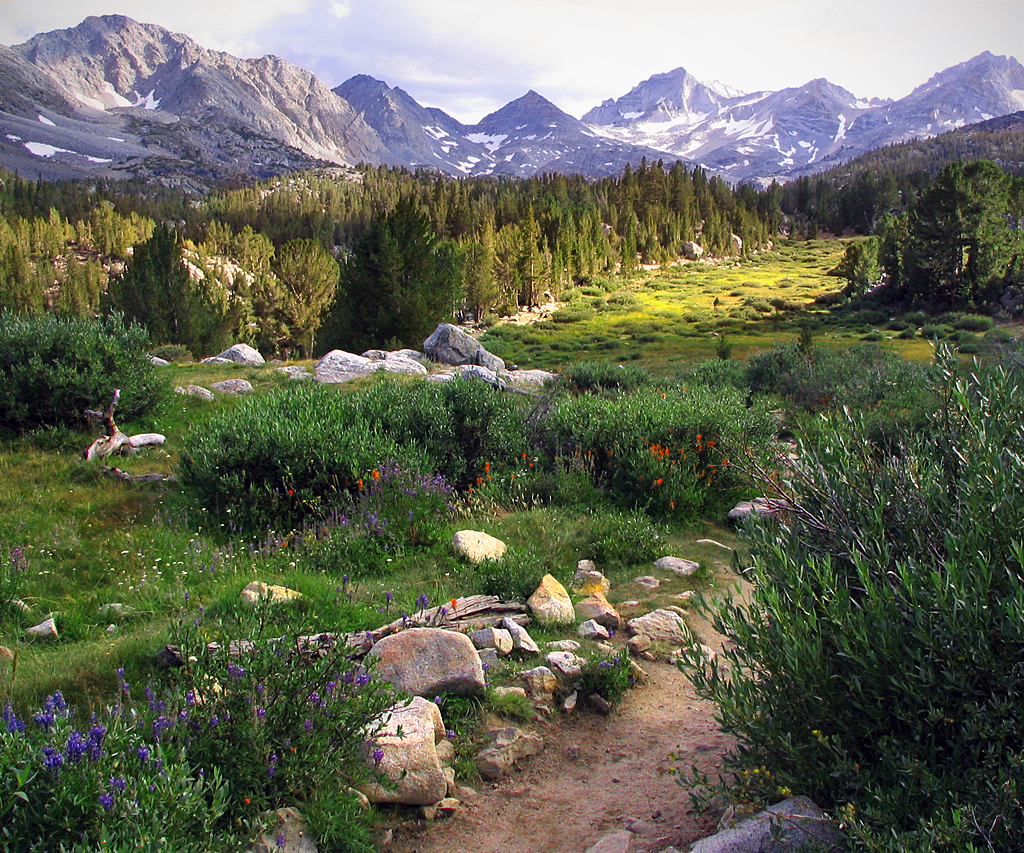
Little Lakes Valley in the John Muir Wilderness

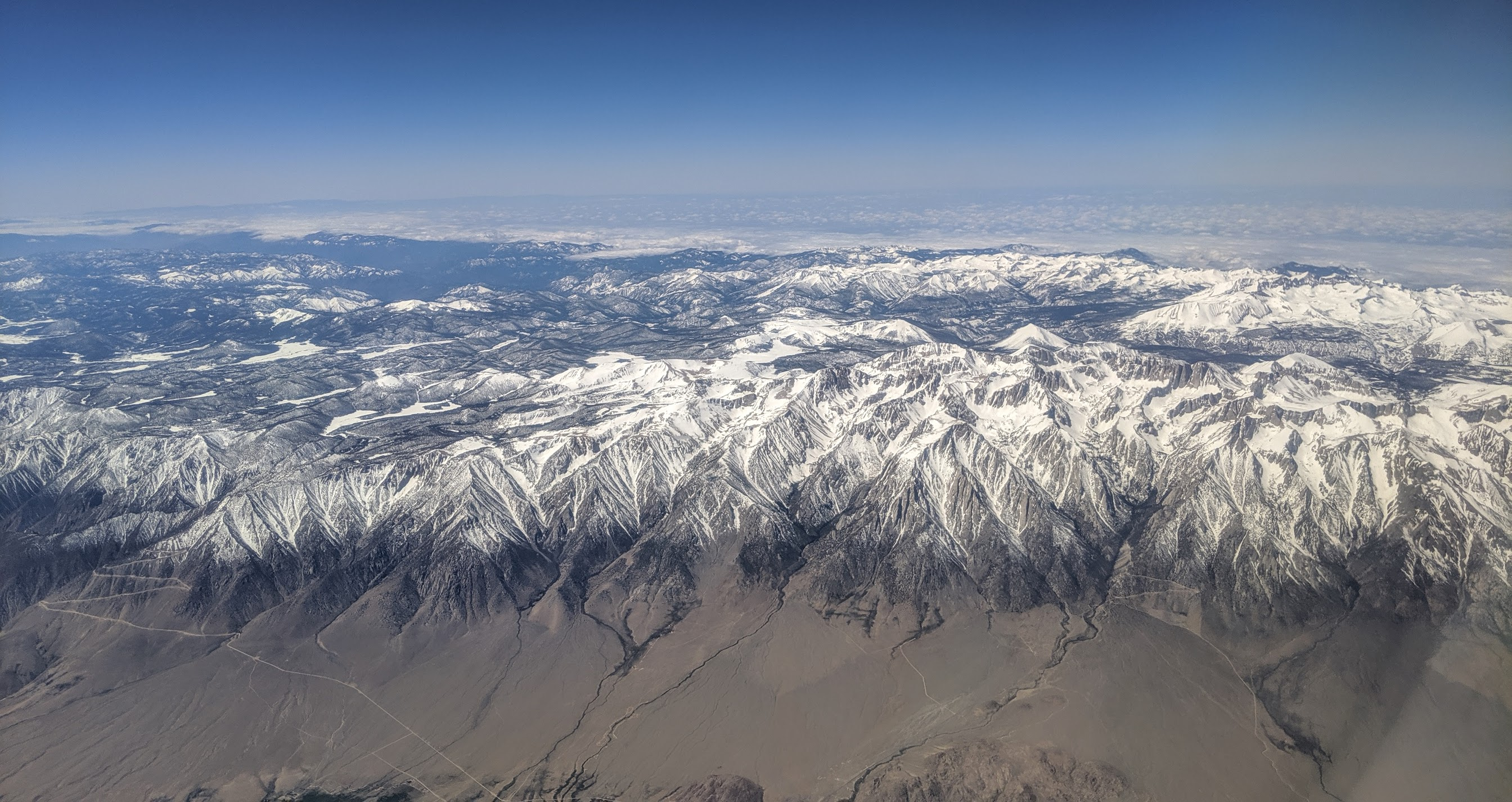
Aerial view from the east of the Eastern Sierra with Mount Whitney. The snow-capped mountains drop steeply to dry desert on the east side.
