= Decker Lake =

Decker Lake may refer to:

- Decker Lake (British Columbia), a lake near the town of Burns Lake, British Columbia, Canada
- Decker Lake, British Columbia, a community on that lake
- Decker Lake (UTA station)
- Decker Lake, a man-made lake in West Valley City, Utah, United States
- Decker Lake (Le Sueur County, Minnesota)
- Decker Lake (Le Sueur County, Minnesota)
- Lake Walter E. Long, Austin, Texas

== See also ==
- Decker (disambiguation)
