= Deckers =

Deckers may refer to:

- Deckers (surname)
- Deckers, Colorado, United States
- Deckers Creek, a river in West Virginia, United States
- Deckers Outdoor Corporation, a footwear manufacturer
- In the fictional Shadowrun universe, computer hackers are known as "deckers"

== See also ==
- Decker (disambiguation)
- Dekkers
