= Hufsmith, Texas =

Unincorporated community in Texas, US

Coordinates: 30°07′20″N 95°35′48″W

Hufsmith is an unincorporated community in Harris County, Texas, United States. The community is about 2 miles to the northeast of Tomball, and about 30 miles to the north-northwest of Houston.

== Education ==
Tomball Independent School District operates schools serving the community.

One elementary school, Tomball Elementary School, serves Hufsmith elementary school residents. The school includes a bilingual program. Two intermediate schools (Beckendorf and Tomball), Tomball Junior High School, and Tomball High School also serve Tomball.
