= Dekkers =

Dekkers is a Dutch occupational surname meaning "thatcher's". Notable people with it include:

- Ad Dekkers (artist) (1938–1974), Dutch sculptor
- Ad Dekkers (cyclist) (1953–2002), Dutch racing cyclist
- Frank Dekkers (born 1961), Dutch painter
- Hans Dekkers (cyclist born 1928) (1928–1984), Dutch racing cyclist
- Hans Dekkers (cyclist born 1981) (born 1981), Dutch racing cyclist
- Hens Dekkers (1915–1966), Dutch boxer
- Hunter Dekkers (born 2001), American football player
- Hurnet Dekkers (born 1974), Dutch rower
- Jan Dekkers (1919–1997), Dutch painter and sculptor
- Joey Dekkers (born 1989), Dutch football midfielder
- Kevin Dekkers (born 1980), Sint Maartener footballer
- Louk Dekkers (born 1998), Dutch football midfielder
- Marijn Dekkers (born 1957), Dutch-American chemist and executive
- Marlies Dekkers (born 1965), Dutch fashion designer
- Midas Dekkers (born 1946), Dutch biologist, writer and journalist
- Ramon Dekkers (1969–2013), Dutch kickboxer and Muay Thai practitioner
- Rudi Dekkers (1956–2024), Dutch businessman and convicted drug trafficker
- Tin Dekkers (1916–2005), Dutch boxer

== See also ==
- Dekker (surname)
- Deckers (surname)
