= Joseph Manjack =

American football player (born 2002)

No. 83 – New York Jets
- Position: Wide receiver
- Roster status: Practice squad

Personal information
- Born: November 15, 2002 (age 23); Houston, Texas, U.S.
- Listed height: 6 ft 3 in (1.91 m)
- Listed weight: 210 lb (95 kg)

Career information
- High school: Tomball Memorial (Tomball, Texas)
- College: USC (2021); Houston (2022–2024); TCU (2025)
- NFL draft: 2026: undrafted

Career history
- Denver Broncos (2026)*; New York Jets (2026–present)*
- * Offseason or practice squad member only

Joseph Edward Manjack IV (born November 15, 2002) is an American professional football wide receiver for the New York Jets of the National Football League (NFL). He played college football for the Houston Cougars, TCU Horned Frogs, and for the USC Trojans. Manjack was signed by the Denver Broncos as an undrafted free agent in 2026.

== Early life ==
Manjack attended Alief Hastings High School in Alief, Texas, (Houston) his freshmen and sophomore years, before transferring to Tomball Memorial High School in Tomball, Texas. He committed to play college football for the USC Trojans.

== College career ==
=== USC ===
As a freshman in 2021, Manjack played in 11 games, recording seven catches for 67 yards. After the conclusion of the season, he entered the NCAA transfer portal.

=== Houston ===
Manjack transferred to play for the Houston Cougars. In his first season as a Cougar in 2022, he was limited after suffering a season-ending injury. In 2023, Manjack hauled in 46 passes for 577 yards and six touchdowns in ten games. In the 2024 season, he totaled 22 receptions for 351 yards and two touchdowns. After the conclusion of the season, Manjack once again entered the NCAA transfer portal.

=== TCU ===
Manjack transferred to play for the TCU Horned Frogs. In the 2025 season, he totaled 44 receptions for 579 yards and three touchdowns. After the conclusion of the season, Manjack declared for the NFL draft.

== Professional career ==
Pre-draft measurables
Height	Weight	Arm length	Hand span	Wingspan	40-yard dash	10-yard split	20-yard split	20-yard shuttle	Three-cone drill	Vertical jump	Broad jump	Bench press
6 ft 2 1/8 in (1.88 m)	197 lb (89 kg)	31 1/4 in (0.79 m)	9 1/8 in (0.23 m)	6 ft 3 5/8 in (1.92 m)	4.53 s	1.59 s	2.58 s	4.15 s	6.84 s	36.5 in (0.93 m)	10 ft 2 in (3.10 m)	9 reps
All values from Pro Day

=== Denver Broncos ===
After not being selected in the 2026 NFL draft, Manjack signed with the Denver Broncos as an undrafted free agent. On August 30, 2026, he was waived by the Broncos as part of final roster cutdowns.

=== New York Jets ===
On November 4, 2026, Manjack signed with the New York Jets practice squad.
