= Rose Hill, Harris County, Texas =

Unincorporated community in Texas, US

Coordinates: 30°04′15″N 95°42′13″W

Rose Hill is an unincorporated community in Harris County, Texas, United States.

== History ==
Rose Hill was settled around 1836 by German immigrant P. W. Rose, the namesake of the area. At the time, it was known as Spring Creek Community, maintaining this name until 1892. In 1846, Johann Heinrich Theis arrived from Galveston and bought land. In 1852, along with some other Germans, he helped found one of the oldest buildings in the area, Salem Lutheran Church, where German-language services were held until the outbreak of World War II. A post office was also founded in the same year and run from Rose Hill until 1905, when mail was routed to nearby Hufsmith.

Rose Hill Methodist Church was built in 1876, and a new Gothic building for the church was completed in 1888 and served as the primary place for worship for eighty years.

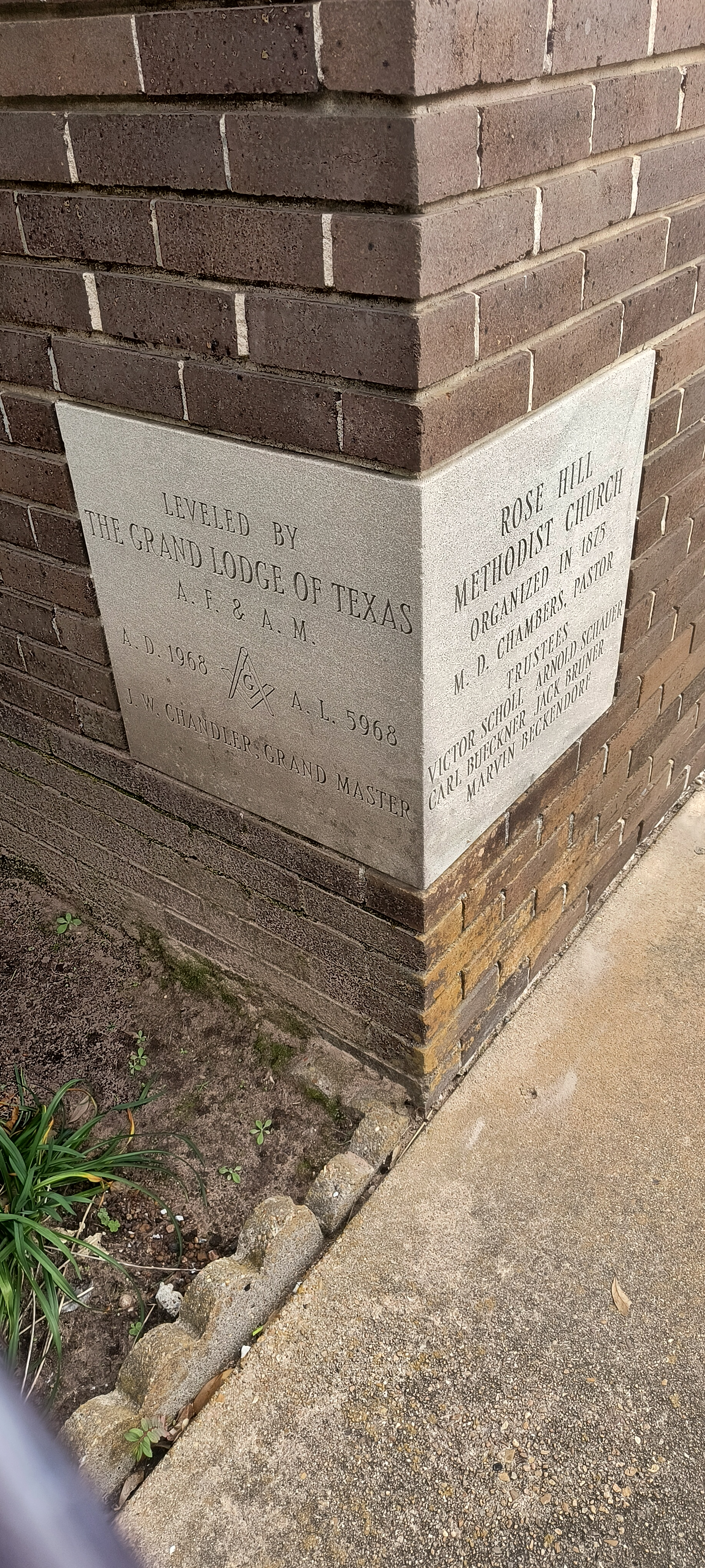
An inscription on a stone showing the congregation to have been organized as early as 1875.

By the 1880s, three general stores, a variety of tradesmen, and seven cotton gins served the inhabitants of Rose Hill, who were mostly cotton farmers. In 1915, there were three hundred people living in Rose Hill, but this number dwindled in the following decades. However, the population began to sharply increase in the 21st century, reaching 3,500 by 2009.

== Education ==
Tomball Independent School District operates schools in the area. Zoned schools include:

- Rosehill Elementary School
- Tomball Intermediate School
- Tomball Junior High School
- Tomball High School

Rosehill includes a bilingual program.

Rosehill Christian School is in the area.

Lone Star College (originally the North Harris Montgomery Community College District) serves the community. The territory in Tomball ISD joined the community college district in 1982. The system operates the Fairbanks Center in unincorporated Harris County; Fairbanks Center is a part of Lone Star College–CyFair.
