= Jacob Wooten =

American pole vaulter (born 1997)

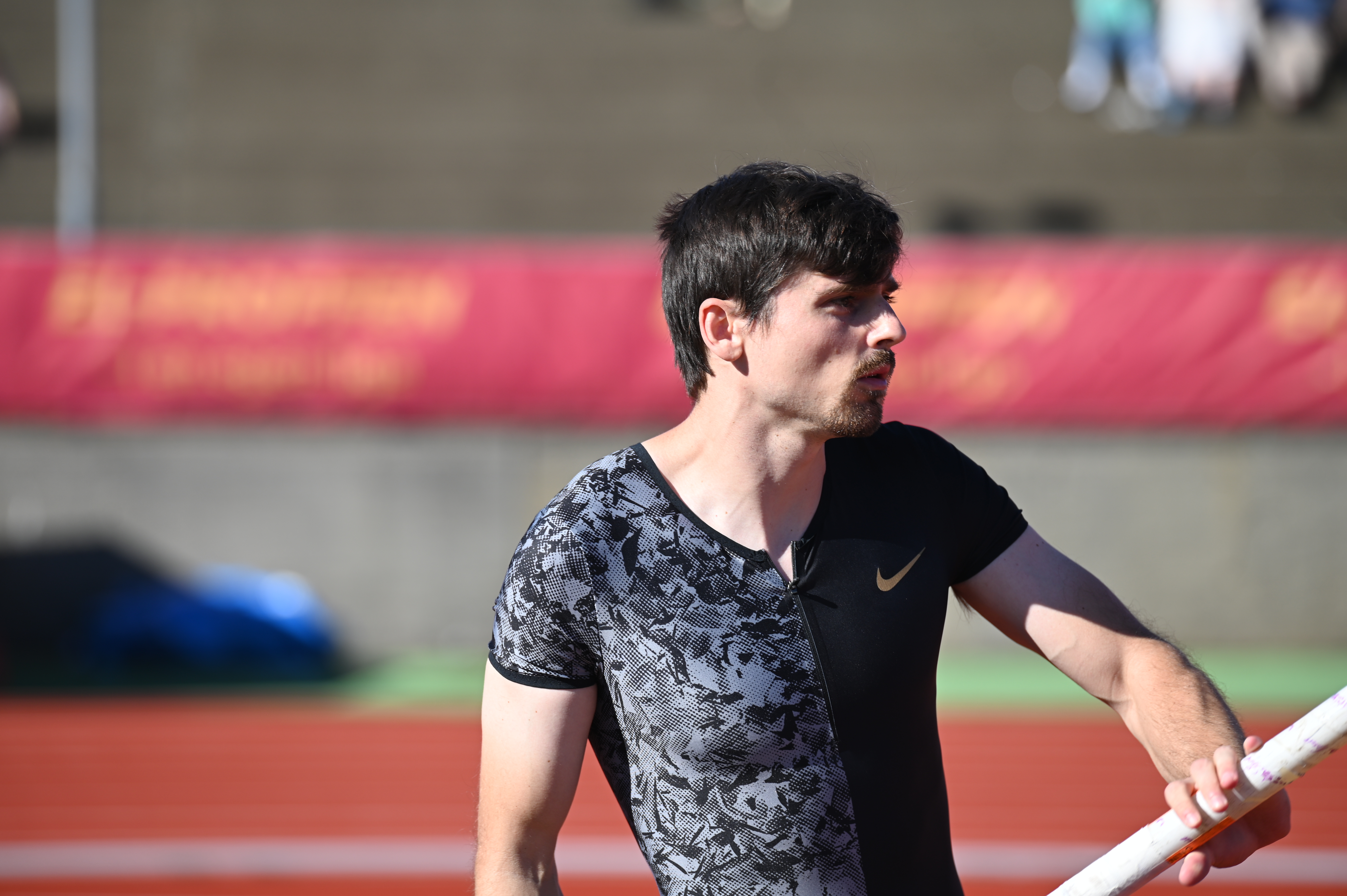
- Jacob Wooten at the 2026 Trond Mohn Games

Personal information
- Nationality: United States
- Born: April 22, 1997 (age 29)
- Home town: Tomball, Texas, U.S.
- Education: Tomball Memorial High School; Texas A&M University

Sport
- Sport: Athletics
- Event: Pole vault
- College team: Texas A&M Aggies
- Coached by: Sean Brady

Achievements and titles
- National finals: 2015 USA U20s; • Pole vault, 6th; 2016 NCAA Indoors; • Pole vault, 9th; 2016 NCAAs; • Pole vault, 12th; 2016 USA U20s; • Pole vault, 3rd (bronze); 2017 NCAAs; • Pole vault, 5th; 2018 NCAA Indoors; • Pole vault, 7th; 2018 NCAAs; • Pole vault, 4th; 2018 USA Champs; • Pole vault, NH; 2019 NCAA Indoors; • Pole vault, 3rd (bronze); 2019 NCAAs; • Pole vault, 15th; 2019 USA Champs; • Pole vault, NH; 2020 USA Indoors; • Pole vault, 4th; 2021 USA Champs; • Pole vault, 5th; 2022 USA Indoors; • Pole vault, 5th; 2022 USA Champs; • Pole vault, 5.60; 2023 USA Indoors; • Pole vault, 2nd (silver); 2023 USA Champs; • Pole vault, 6th
- Personal best: PV: 5.90m (2020)
- Updated on January 1, 2024

Jacob Wooten (born April 22, 1997) is an American pole vaulter. He was the runner-up at the 2023 USA Indoor Track and Field Championships in the pole vault.

== Biography ==
Wooten is from Tomball, Texas where he attended Tomball Memorial High School. He won the 2014 University Interscholastic League Division 5A state meet in the pole vault, as well as the 2015 USATF National Junior Olympic Track & Field Championships.

From 2016 to 2019, Wooten competed on the Texas A&M Aggies track and field team. He made seven NCAA finals appearances, with a best finish of 3rd at the 2019 NCAA Division I Indoor Track and Field Championships. At those championships, the meet officials mistakenly set the bar two inches too high, causing confusion and requiring a re-do of that round of vaulting. Texas A&M coach Pat Henry said that the mistake "cost" Wooten, and that it was "not a good situation".

In February 2020, Wooten jumped a personal best of 5.90 metres at the International Urban Pole Vault Meeting in Mexico City. Though both Wooten and Mat Ludwing cleared the height, Wooten cleared on his second attempt white Ludwing cleared on his third, giving Wooten the win and $2500 prize. The mark was the highest jump ever achieved on Mexican soil, equalling Toby Stevenson's height from 2005. After previously using just six or seven lefts, Wooten used a new "eight lefts" technique to set the personal best, stepping eight times with his left foot for an extended sprint on the vault runway.

Wooten achieved his first USA Championships medal at the 2023 USA Indoor Track and Field Championships, finishing second to Sam Kendricks. Wooten led through the first five heights, including setting an indoor 5.86 m personal best on his first attempt which placed him 10th on the U.S. all-time indoor list. However, Kendricks passed on his third attempt at 5.86 m and cleared a facility record 5.91 m on his final attempt, giving him the title over Wooten.

== Statistics ==
=== Personal bests ===
Event	Mark	Place	Competition	Venue	Date	Ref
Pole vault	5.90 metres (19 ft 4 in) A	1st place, gold medalist(s)	International Urban Pole Vault Meeting (Spanish: Encuentro Internacional Urbano de Salto con Garrocha)	Mexico City, Mexico	February 22, 2020	
