= Josh Breaux =

American baseball player (born 1997)

Free agent
- Catcher
- Born: October 7, 1997 (age 28); Tomball, Texas, U.S.
- Bats: Right Throws: Right

Joshua Breaux (born October 7, 1997) is an American professional baseball catcher who is a free agent.

== Amateur career ==
Breaux attended Tomball High School in Tomball, Texas and played college baseball at McLennan Community College. In 2017, he played collegiate summer baseball with the Falmouth Commodores of the Cape Cod Baseball League. Breaux was drafted by the Houston Astros in the 36th round of the 2017 Major League Baseball draft but did not sign and returned to McLennan.

== Professional career ==
=== New York Yankees ===
Breaux was drafted by the New York Yankees in the second round, with the 61st overall selection, of the 2018 Major League Baseball draft.

Breaux made his professional debut with the rookie–level Gulf Coast Yankees before being promoted to the Low–A Staten Island Yankees. In 30 total games, he hit .269 with 13 RBI. Breaux played the 2019 season with the Single–A Charleston RiverDogs, slashing .271/.324/.518 with 13 home runs and 49 RBI. He did not play for a minor league team in 2020 due to the cancellation of the minor league season because of the COVID-19 pandemic, but did play five games in the Constellation Energy League.

Breaux started 2021 with the High–A Hudson Valley Renegades before being promoted to the Double–A Somerset Patriots. In 90 games between the two affiliates, he accumulated a .249/.298/.503 batting line with career–highs in home runs (23) and RBI (63). Breaux split the 2022 campaign between Somerset and the Triple–A Scranton/Wilkes-Barre RailRiders, posting a cumulative .219/.283/.422 batting line with 19 home runs and 50 RBI across 94 appearances.

Breaux split 2023 between Hudson Valley, Somerset, and Scranton. In 50 games for the three affiliates, he hit .243/.302/.466 with 12 home runs and 22 RBI. Breaux played in 11 games for Triple–A Scranton in 2024, hitting .143/.189/.314 with two home runs and five RBI. Breaux was released by the Yankees organization on June 29, 2024.

=== Philadelphia Phillies ===
On July 1, 2024, Breaux signed a minor league contract with the Philadelphia Phillies. He spent the remainder of the season with the Double-A Reading Fightin Phils and Triple-A Lehigh Valley IronPigs, playing in 29 total games for the two affiliates.

In 2025, Breaux made 51 appearances split between Reading and Lehigh Valley, batting a cumulative .222/.307/.342 with three home runs s and 15 RBI. He elected free agency following the season on November 6, 2025.

=== Chicago White Sox ===
On February 6, 2026, Breaux signed a minor league contract with the Chicago White Sox. He made 15 appearances for the Triple-A Charlotte Knights, batting .186/.250/.302 with one home run and seven RBI. Breaux was released by the White Sox organization on June 28.
