= Animal (De)liberation =

2016 book written by Jan Deckers

- Author: Jan Deckers
- Publisher: Ubiquity Press
- Publication date: 2016

Animal (De)liberation: Should the Consumption of Animal Products Be Banned? is a 2016 book by Jan Deckers, published by Ubiquity Press. The book engages with the work of many scholars who have written on the subject, including Carol J. Adams, Alasdair Cochrane, Gary Francione, Melanie Joy, Martha Nussbaum, and Peter Singer, as well as with the views of non-specialists, including slaughterhouse workers involved with the film Slaughterhouse: The Task of Blood, released by Century Films in 2005.

== Basic idea ==
The key question dealt with in the book is whether the consumption of products derived from the bodies of animals should be banned. The position that Deckers adopts is unusual in that he argues that this question must be resolved by addressing the question of what is optimal for human health, where Deckers argues for an unconditional duty to maximise positive global health impacts, which is tantamount to a duty to minimise negative global health impacts. Applied to the consumption of animal products, this duty transpires into the duty to commit to qualified moral veganism: vegan diets ought to be the default diets for the majority of the human population.

== Synopsis ==
In the first chapter, Deckers abstracts from some of the deeper questions associated with this topic by focusing on the narrow global health impacts, ignoring the question how nonhuman organisms ought or ought not to be treated when human beings make decisions about what to eat. The chapter reveals that, in many situations, omnivorous and vegetarian diets produce more narrowly defined negative global health impacts than vegan diets. The survey is limited mainly to how different diets impact on zoonoses, as well as to how they impact on land, water, fossil fuels, and atmospheric resources. It is also argued that omnivorous and vegetarian diets result in significant negative health impacts upon the lives of those who work in the farm animal sector, for example on those who work in slaughterhouses.

In chapter two, Deckers argues that human moral agents must move beyond these narrow considerations as our duty to strive for holistic human health cannot be fulfilled unless the interests of nonhuman organisms are also considered. In contrast to mainstream theories in animal ethics, which have argued mainly for duties to avoid inflicting pain, suffering, and death upon other animals and who denounce speciesism, Deckers argues that a good moral theory embraces speciesism and should consider the consumption of animal products in light of an extension of speciesism, which he refers to as ‘animalism’, a commitment to give preferential treatment to all individuals in the animal kingdom.

On this basis, Deckers argues that, in many situations, plants can be justifiably consumed, whereas animal products, even if they were derived from animals who had not been killed but who had died naturally or accidentally, ought not to be eaten.

This prima facie taboo on the consumption of animal products is also brought to bear on the issue presented by those who entertain the idea of genetically engineering animals in the hope that doing so might reduce their capacities to feel pain or to suffer. Another interest that Deckers considers to be relevant in relation to this issue is the human interest in safeguarding the integrity of nature. Drawing on the worldview of Alfred North Whitehead, Deckers argues that the genetic engineering of animals presents a greater threat to this interest compared to conventional methods of breeding animals, which are, incidentally, not free from the concern that they fail to safeguard the integrity of nature either.

The human interests in adopting a taboo on the consumption of animal products and in safeguarding the integrity of nature are also brought to bear on the issue presented by another technology that is currently being developed to reduce some of the concerns sketched in the book: the production of lab-grown, cultured, synthetic, or in-vitro flesh.

Deckers argues that we should adopt a prima facie duty to allow cells to be where they are, rather than to extract them from animals and to manipulate them to do things outside their natural contexts inside Petri dishes. However, he argues also that this duty might be overridden by the greater duty to curtail the human consumption of conventional animal products. In addition, Deckers argues that, if the assumptions that domesticated cats cannot maintain good health on vegan diets and that they must consume some flesh are correct, the development of in-vitro flesh in order to feed them would be appropriate.

Chapter two culminates in the development of a theory which Deckers calls qualified moral veganism. His commitment to veganism is qualified as Deckers's theory does not demand that people abstain from eating animal products in all situations. It is a moral rather than a dietary position that can be adopted by everyone, even by those who have very good reasons not to adopt vegan diets. It is a vegan theory in the sense that vegan diets ought to be the default diets for the majority of the human population.

Chapter three sets out the political project that is associated with this theory, the vegan project, which strives to bring about legal and political reform in all jurisdictions across the globe to introduce qualified bans on the consumption of animal products. The vegan project does not stand or fall if governments either fail to relate to some of the interests that Deckers brings to bear on the issue or do not ascribe the same weight to them. Rather, Deckers argues that something like the vegan project can also be justified merely by appealing to the much narrower range of human health concerns that are discussed in chapter one.

Chapter three also refutes three objections that have been raised against the vegan project. The first is that it would be pointless, as many people are not prepared to embrace it; the second that it should be rejected as it would jeopardise human food security unjustifiably; and the third that the vegan project alienates human beings from the natural world.

In chapter four Deckers explores what other people think about qualified moral veganism by evaluating a number of discussions that others have had on the topic of the book. It engages with the views of academics and non-specialists, including slaughterhouse workers. Deckers argues that qualified moral veganism stands firm in spite of public opposition, and he also sheds some light on some of the key obstacles towards its wider acceptance, including the roles played by cultural and religious traditions.

Deckers recognises that many people believe that vegan diets are nutritionally deficient, which is why the appendix of the book engages with the nutritional literature, concluding that carefully chosen vegan diets are nutritionally adequate.

== Reception ==
Mancilla refers to Deckers's qualified moral veganism as ‘an innovative defense of veganism’ because of its concern with maximising positive global health impacts, and its primary focus on safeguarding the health of moral agents, which would demand commitments to animalism (‘an interest in attributing greater moral significance to either dead or living animals than to other biological organisms’) and to evolutionism (‘an interest in attributing greater moral significance to those animals biologically closer to us’). She argues that Deckers's focus on holistic human health highlights a moral concern with the consumption of animals who die naturally or accidentally, an issue that has been largely overlooked by scholars in animal ethics. The book has also been reviewed by Torres Aldave, Laestadius, and Paez, who question Deckers's commitment to speciesism. Deckers has also responded to these critics.
