= Chris Herrmann =

American baseball player (born 1987)

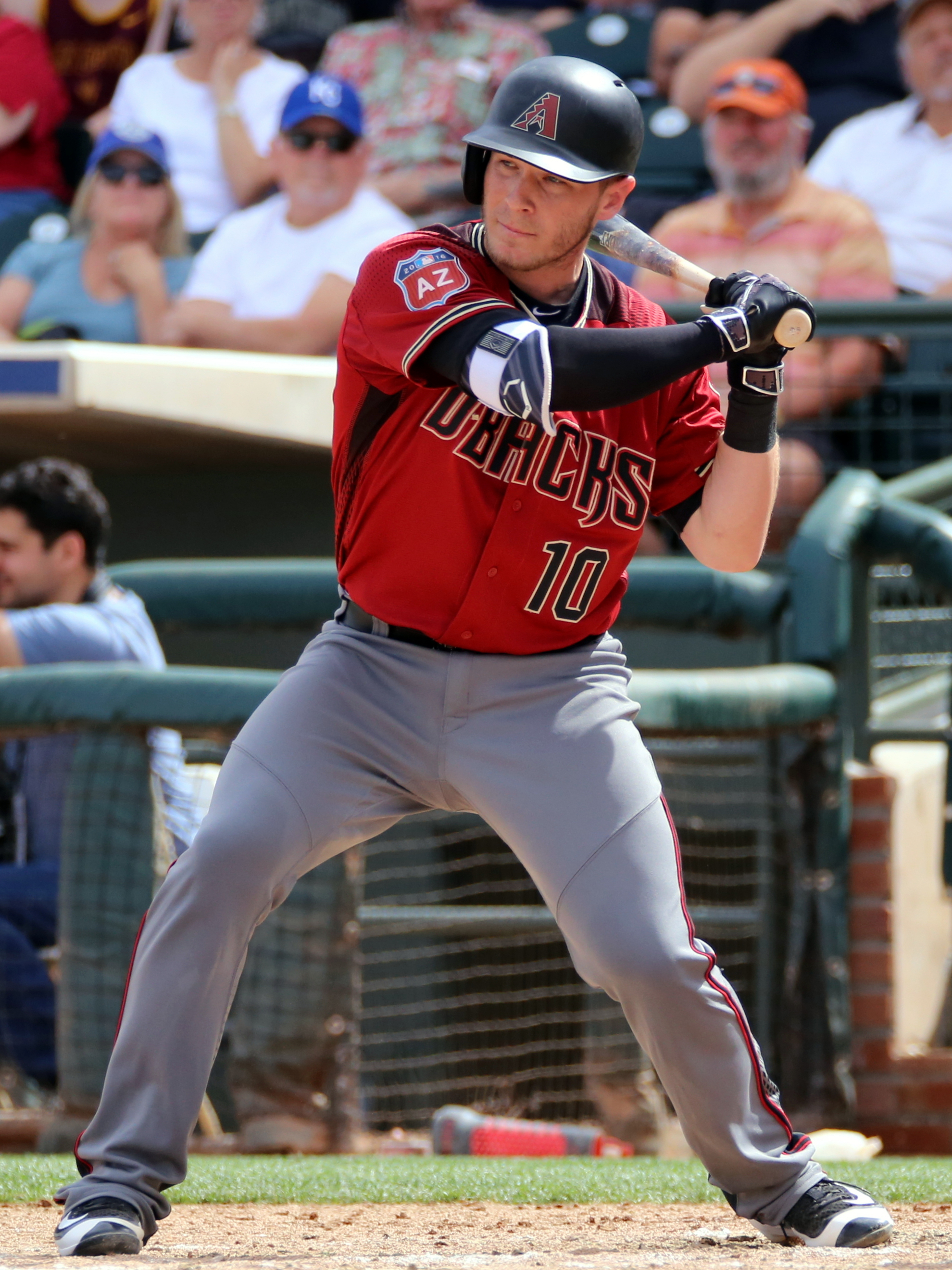
- Herrmann with the Arizona Diamondbacks in 2016
- Catcher / Outfielder
- Born: November 24, 1987 (age 38); Tomball, Texas, U.S.
- Batted: Left Threw: Right

MLB debut
- September 16, 2012, for the Minnesota Twins

Last MLB appearance
- September 9, 2019, for the Oakland Athletics

MLB statistics
- Batting average: .205
- Home runs: 25
- Runs batted in: 103
- Stats at Baseball Reference

Teams
- Minnesota Twins (2012–2015); Arizona Diamondbacks (2016–2017); Seattle Mariners (2018); Oakland Athletics (2019)

Christopher Ryan Herrmann (born November 24, 1987) is an American former professional baseball catcher and outfielder. He played in Major League Baseball (MLB) for the Minnesota Twins, Arizona Diamondbacks, Seattle Mariners, and Oakland Athletics. He played college baseball at the University of Miami.

== Amateur career ==
Born and raised in Tomball, Texas, Herrmann attended Tomball High School where he earned numerous honors as a second baseman. After high school, he attended Alvin Community College where he hit .442 with 14 home runs, and was named to the NJCAA Division I All-American team. In the Junior College World Series, Herrmann hit .500 with three home runs and was named to the All-Tournament team. After only one season at Alvin, Herrmann transferred to the University of Miami. At Miami, he spent one season at the school before deciding to play professional baseball.

== Professional career ==
Herrmann was drafted by the Baltimore Orioles in the 10th round of the 2008 MLB draft out of Alvin Community College, but he did not sign.

=== Minnesota Twins ===
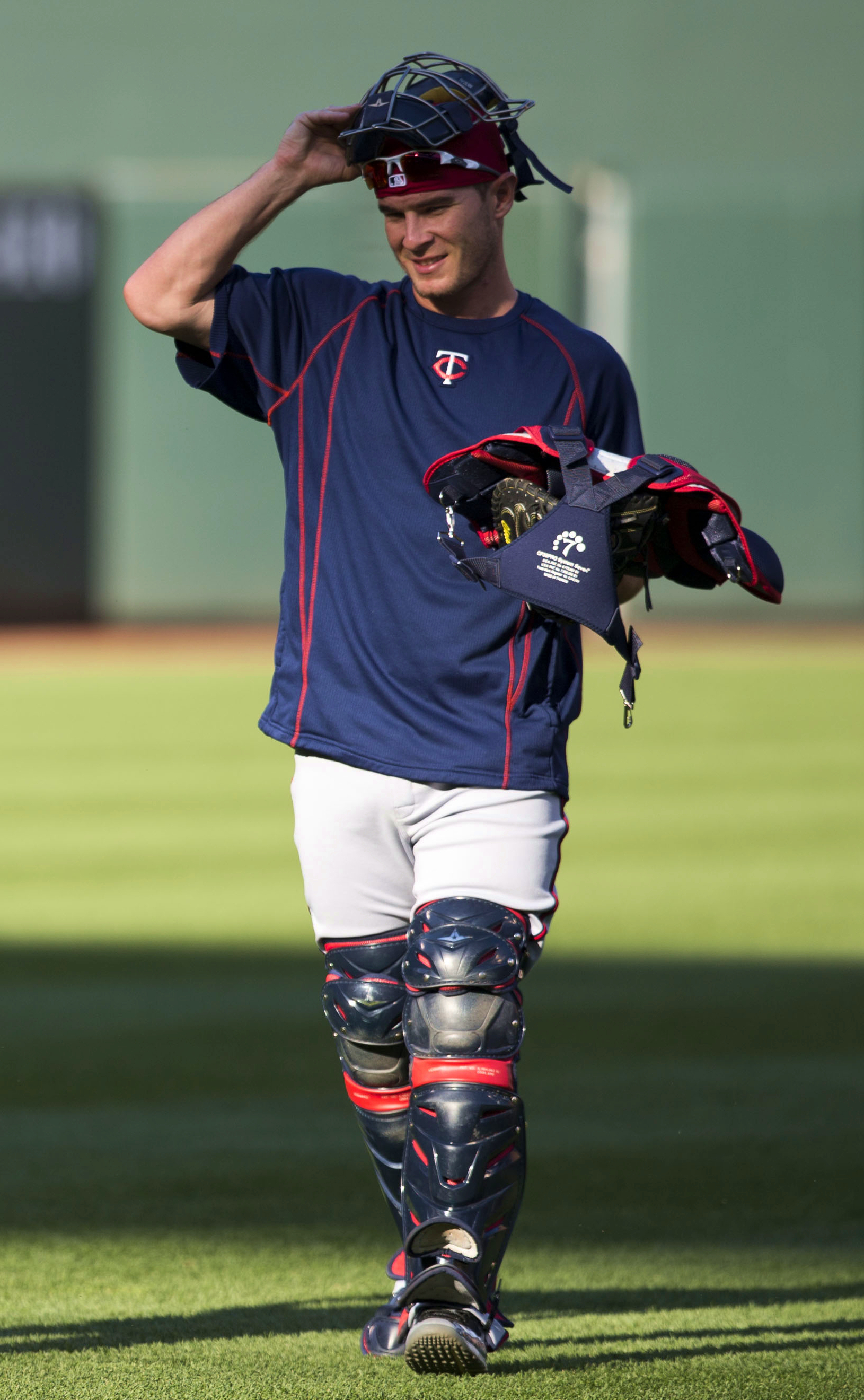
Herrmann with the Minnesota Twins, 2015

In the 2009 MLB draft, Herrman was again selected, this time out of the University of Miami by the Minnesota Twins in the sixth round. He began his professional career in 2009 with the Elizabethton Twins, and advanced to Double-A level in 2011 with the New Britain Rock Cats.

After playing 127 games for New Britain during 2012, Herrmann was called up to the majors for the first time on September 14, 2012. He played in seven games, collecting a single and one run batted in (RBI) in 18 at bats. During 2013, he split time between the Twins and the Triple-A Rochester Red Wings. He hit his first MLB home run on June 2, 2013, off of Jeremy Bonderman of the Seattle Mariners. Herrmann played in a career high 57 games for the Twins in 2013, split almost evenly between catcher and outfield, batting just .204 with four home runs and 18 RBIs. He displayed poor plate discipline, striking out 49 times in 157 at bats.

In 2014, he batted .213 in 75 at bats, playing almost all of his MLB games in the outfield. In addition to 33 games with the Twins, he also played in 60 Triple-A games. In 2015, Herrmann had a slash line of .146/.214/.272, striking out 37 times in 103 at bats. For the season, he played in 45 MLB games and 23 Triple-A games.

Overall, in parts of four seasons with the Twins, Herrmann appeared in 142 MLB games, batting .181 with six home runs and 33 RBIs. He made 69 appearances at catcher, 52 appearances in the outfield, two appearances at first base, and was the designated hitter three times; he was also used as a pinch hitter and pinch runner.

=== Arizona Diamondbacks ===
On November 10, 2015, Herrmann was traded to the Arizona Diamondbacks for Daniel Palka.

In 2016, Herrmann hit a career high .284 in 56 games for the Diamondbacks. The following season, he served as a utility player for Arizona playing catcher, outfield, and first base, batting .181/.273/.345 and hitting 10 home runs with 27 RBIs in 106 games as he struck out 67 times in 226 at bats. Herrmann was designated for assignment on March 25, 2018, and released the following day.

=== Seattle Mariners ===
On April 7, 2018, Herrmann signed a minor league deal with the Seattle Mariners. He began the season in Triple-A and was called up by Seattle during the season, appearing in 36 games, batting .237 and striking out 24 times in 76 at bats. On defense, he caught 4 of 18 base-stealers.

On November 2, 2018, Herrmann was claimed off waivers by the Houston Astros. He was non-tendered by the Astros on November 30 and became a free agent.

=== Oakland Athletics ===
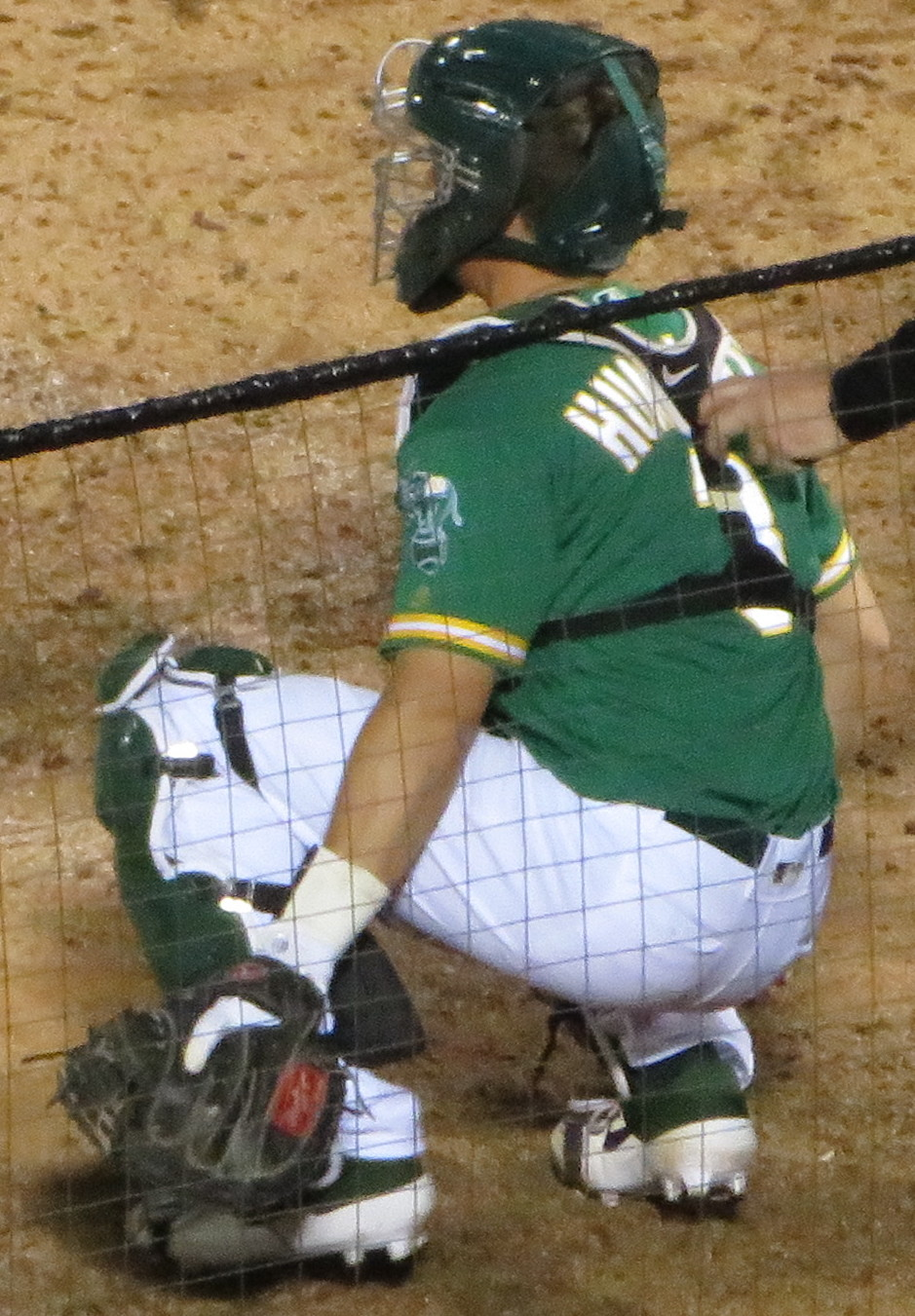
Herrmann with the Oakland Athletics in 2019

On December 11, 2018, Herrmann signed a one-year deal with the Oakland Athletics. On March 19, 2019, Herrmann was placed on the 60-day injured list to start the season, after undergoing arthroscopic surgery on his right knee on March 8. He debuted on July 2 against his former team, the Minnesota Twins, hitting a grand slam en route to an 8–6 Athletics victory. In his second game for the A's on July 4, Herrmann went 4-for-4 and drove in a run. On September 10, Herrmann was designated for assignment. Herrmann elected free agency on September 13.

=== Tampa Bay Rays ===
On January 13, 2020, Herrmann signed a minor league deal with the Tampa Bay Rays. Herrmann did not play in a game for the Rays organization due to the cancellation of the minor league season because of the COVID-19 pandemic. Herrmann exercised his opt-out clause on July 18, 2020, and became a free agent.

=== San Francisco Giants ===
On July 25, 2020, Herrmann signed a minor league deal with the San Francisco Giants organization. Herrmann also did not play in a game for the Giants organization due to the cancellation of the minor league season because of the COVID-19 pandemic. He became a free agent on November 2.

=== Boston Red Sox ===
On February 11, 2021, Herrmann signed a minor-league deal with the Boston Red Sox. Herrmann played in 48 games with the Triple-A Worcester Red Sox in 2021, slashing .222/.328/.431 with seven home runs and 20 RBI. He elected free agency following the season on November 7.

=== Washington Nationals ===
On March 16, 2022, Herrmann signed a minor league contract with the Washington Nationals that included an invitation to Spring Training. Herrmann appeared in 28 games for the Triple-A Rochester Red Wings, hitting .173/.267/.187 with no home runs and 8 RBI. He was released on August 9, 2022.

=== Kansas City Monarchs ===
On March 22, 2023, Herrmann signed with the Acereros de Monclova of the Mexican League. However, prior to the start of the season, on April 18, he signed with the Kansas City Monarchs of the American Association of Professional Baseball. Herrmann played in 94 games for Kansas City, hitting .355/.439/.617 with 23 home runs and 88 RBI. He was additionally named an All–Star for the Monarchs during the season and won the leagues Player of the Year award, as well as the 2023 American Association Championship. In September 2023, Herrmann was loaned to the AAPB's Fargo-Moorhead RedHawks to participate in the 2023 Baseball Champions League Americas, which the RedHawks won. After the 2023 season, Herrmann retired from professional baseball.
