= Gary Porter (American football) =

American football player and coach

Profile
- Position: Quarterback

Personal information
- Listed height: 6 ft 1 in (1.85 m)
- Listed weight: 195 lb (88 kg)

Career information
- High school: Tomball (Tomball, Texas)
- College: Oklahoma State (1992–1993); Northwestern Oklahoma State (1994–1996)
- NFL draft: 1997: undrafted

Career history

Playing
- Texas Terror (1997); Peoria Pirates (2000)

Coaching
- Northwestern Oklahoma State (1999) Linebackers coach; Peoria Pirates (2001) Head coach; Mohegan Wolves (2002) Head coach

Awards and highlights
- Gold Cup champion (2000); OIC Offensive Player of the Year (1996); First-team All-OIC (1996)

Career AFL statistics
- Comp. / Att.: 65 / 105
- Passing yards: 792
- TD–INT: 13–6
- Passer rating: 92.24
- Rushing TDs: 1
- Stats at ArenaFan.com

Gary Porter is an American former professional football quarterback who played one season with the Texas Terror of the Arena Football League (AFL). He played college football at Oklahoma State University and Northwestern Oklahoma State University.

== Early life ==
Porter played high school football at Tomball High School in Tomball, Texas. He completed 104 of 196 passes for 1,558 yards and 11 touchdowns his junior year. As a senior in 1991, he completed 60% of his passes for 1,400 yards but missed two games due to injury.

== College career ==
Porter first played college football for the Oklahoma State Cowboys of Oklahoma State University. He played in ten games, starting seven after taking the job from Andy Loveland, as a true freshman in 1992, recording 96 completions on 188 passing attempts (51.1%) for 1,280 yards, seven touchdowns, and 14 interceptions. Porter and two teammates also served a one-game suspension that season for a hotel incident. On December 1, 1992, he pleaded guilty to driving under the influence and was sentenced to one year of probation. Porter started the first three games of the 1993 season before being benched for Tone' Jones. He returned as starter after Jones suffered an injury. Overall, Porter played in five games, starting four, in 1993, completing 37 of 69 passes (53.6%) for 478 yards, two touchdowns, and three interceptions. On October 29, 1993, he was suspended indefinitely for missing classes and a team meeting.

Porter then transferred to Northwestern Oklahoma State University to play for the Northwestern Oklahoma State Rangers. He had to sit out the 1994 season due to academic reasons. He completed 56 of 132 passes for 906 yards, four touchdowns and four interceptions in 1995. He only played in two complete games, with parts of five others, that season due to shoulder injuries. As a senior in 1996, Porter was named first-team All-Oklahoma Intercollegiate Conference (OIC) and shared OIC Offensive Player of the Year honors with Southeastern Oklahoma State quarterback Jeff Moser.

== Professional career ==
Porter went undrafted in the 1997 NFL draft. He then played in 12 games for the Texas Terror of the Arena Football League during the 1997 season, completing 65 of 105 passes (61.9%) for 792 yards, 13 touchdowns, and six interceptions while also scoring one rushing touchdown.

Porter played for the Peoria Pirates of the Indoor Football League (IFL) in 2000. He missed four weeks after tearing his pelvic tendon off the bone during the first game of the season. He finished the season throwing for 1,532 yards and 38 touchdowns as the Pirates finished the regular season with a 14–0 record. They then won all three of their playoff games, including a victory in the 2000 Gold Cup over the Bismarck Blaze to become IFL champions.

== Coaching career ==
Porter was the linebackers coach at Northwestern Oklahoma State in 1999.

The Pirates moved to the af2 in 2001 and Porter became the team's new head coach. They finished the 2001 season with a 7–9 record.

He was the head coach of the af2's Mohegan Wolves during the team's first season in 2002. The Wolves went 3–13 that year.

== Personal life ==
Porter later became a high school teacher, football coach, and track coach in Texas.
