= Tomball Memorial High School =

Location
- 19100 Northpointe Ridge Ln; Tomball, Texas 77377-6028; United States; 30.035232°N 95.631895°W

Information
- School type: Public high school
- Established: 2011
- School district: Tomball Independent School District
- Principal: Jennifer Collier
- Faculty: 169.43 (FTE)
- Grades: 9-12
- Enrollment: 2,992 (2022–23)
- Student to teacher ratio: 17.66
- Campus: Suburban
- Colors: Navy & Silver
- Athletics conference: UIL Class 6A
- Website: Tomball Memorial High School

Tomball Memorial High School (TMHS) is a senior high school in unincorporated Harris County, Texas, United States, south of the city of Tomball and in the Houston metropolitan area. It is a part of the Tomball Independent School District (TISD), and is the district's second high school. It is by Northpointe Lane and Northpointe Boulevard.

== History ==
The school was built as part of a 2007 bond, worth $198 million in total, and had a cost of $59.2 million. It opened on August 12, 2011. It initially held grades 9 and 10 and had about 840 students.

The first principal, Carol Houston, was previously associate principal at Tomball High School.

The first 12th grade class was scheduled to graduate in 2014.

== Campus ==
The campus has 350,000 square feet (33,000 m^{2}) of space.

It has two stories and a capacity of 3,000 students.

== School colors and mascot ==
The school colors are navy and silver and the mascot is the wildcat.

== Demographics ==
In the 2022-2023 school year, there were 2,992 students. 3 were American Indian/Alaska Native, 343 were Asian, 201 were Black, 866 were Hispanic, 1,445 were White, and 134 were Two or More Races. 832 students were eligible for free or reduced-price lunch.

== Academics ==
For the 2018-2019 school year, the school received an A grade from the Texas Education Agency, with an overall score of 93 out of 100. The school received an A grade in two domains, Student Achievement (score of 95) and School Progress (score of 92), and a B grade in Closing the Gaps (score of 89). The school received five of the seven possible distinction designations for: Academic Achievement in Mathematics, Academic Achievement in English Language Arts/Reading, Academic Achievement in Social Studies, Top 25%:Comparative Academic Growth, and Top 25%:Comparative Closing the Gaps. The two distinction designations the school did not receive were Academic Achievement in Science and Post-Secondary Readiness.

== Athletics ==
Tomball Memorial's primary athletic rival is Tomball High School. As of 2018, the school is in Conference 6a, Region II, District 14.

The school held its first homecoming game, against Waller High School, in 2014. Tomball Memorial lost 41-31.

=== Basketball ===
In a three-year span until 2016, Tomball Memorial High had three head coaches. The basketball team entered its first playoff in 2014 against Wheatley High School, which ended in Wheatley's loss. In the 2014-2015 school year, Tomball Memorial won the district title by 13-1 and two playoff games; the team won its first-ever playoff against Sharpstown High School. The school's overall record that year was 24-10.

=== Soccer ===
The soccer team took only 3 years after opening to make the playoffs. In their first playoff run in 2014, they lost in the 4th round to Waco University by a score of 3-0. The following year, in the 4th season of being open, the wildcats soccer team made a run in the playoffs and found themselves in the UIL Texas State Tournament. They finished 3rd in the state after losing to Lufkin in the state semifinal by a score of 1-0.

=== Other programs ===
The band uniforms were designed to fit each gender and to remain fashionable for their seven-year lifespans. In January 2011 the TISD board approved spending $75,000 for the creation of these uniforms, about $298 per uniform.

== Notable alumni ==
- Jacob Wooten (2015), pole vaulter
- Joseph Manjack (2021), football player
- Molly Haywood (2023), pole vaulter
