= Rosehill Christian School =

Location
- 19830 FM 2920 Road; Tomball, Texas 77377; United States; 30.081908°N 95.733318°W

Information
- Type: Private Christian school
- Established: 1990; 36 years ago
- Principal: Robert Smith
- Head of school: Lauren Dyal
- Faculty: 65 (2020-2021)
- Grades: PreK-12
- Enrollment: 503 (2023-24)
- Colors: Red, Black and White
- Athletics conference: TAPPS 3A
- Team name: Eagles
- Rivals: Brazos Christian (Bryan)St. Francis Episcopal (Houston), Northland Christian (Houston), Frassati Catholic (Spring) Sacred Heart (Hallettsvile) St. Paul (Shiner)
- Website: www.rosehillchristian.org

Rosehill Christian School (RCS) is a PreK-12 private Christian school in the Rose Hill area of unincorporated Harris County, Texas, near Tomball, United States.

== History ==
The school opened in 1989 as a private school for students living in the Boys' and Girls' Country facility in Hockley. As a ministry of Boys and Girls Country, it had 63 students. Several parents formed a school board after they learned that Boys' and Girls' Country had agreed to send its students to public schools. The Christian school was allowed to remain at Boys' and Girls' Country for two additional years. A member of the board bought the land for the permanent school facility.

In 1994 the school joined the Association of Christian Schools International (ASCI). In the 1995-1996 school year Rosehill Christian became a member of the Texas Association of Private and Parochial Schools (TAPPS). The Rosehill Charitable Foundation was established after two individuals paid off the school's debts in 2005. ICAA / SACS-CASI fully accredited the school in 2008. In 2014 the school had 425 students. This increased to 481 the following year. The school faced a possibility of an enrollment increase as the Grand Parkway opened.

== Campus ==
It is 6 miles (9.7 km) west of Tomball, in an area between U.S. Highway 290 and Texas State Highway 249 that is in proximity to the Grand Parkway. The school campus has 29-acre (12 ha) of land. Initially it had 15 acres (6.1 ha) but the school purchased additional land in 2007.

Building A, which opened in 1996, is the preschool building. Building C, which opened in 1994, serves as the chapel. Building D serves as the elementary school and upper school building. The elementary portion opened in 1993 and the upper school building was opened in 1995. Building E is an open-air pavilion that also opened in 1995. Building G, completed in 2001, is a gymnasium also known as the "Faith Activity Center." Building J is the athletic training center.

The 2010s capital campaign has multiple phases: Its first phase is a 40,000-square-foot (3,700 m^{2}) multiplex for athletics and performing arts, and its second phase is a 45,621-square-foot (4,238.3 m^{2}) high school building. In addition a 300 seat chapel is a part o the campaign. The school's performing arts and basketball court building, which also had 13 classrooms, was scheduled to officially open on January 30, 2017. The multiplex building would allow the school to have about an additional 200 students. The 16 classroom high school building will cost $9.4 million; it will have administrative offices, art rooms, band rooms, choir rooms, a computer lab, music rooms, and two science laboratories. The chapel will cost $3 million.

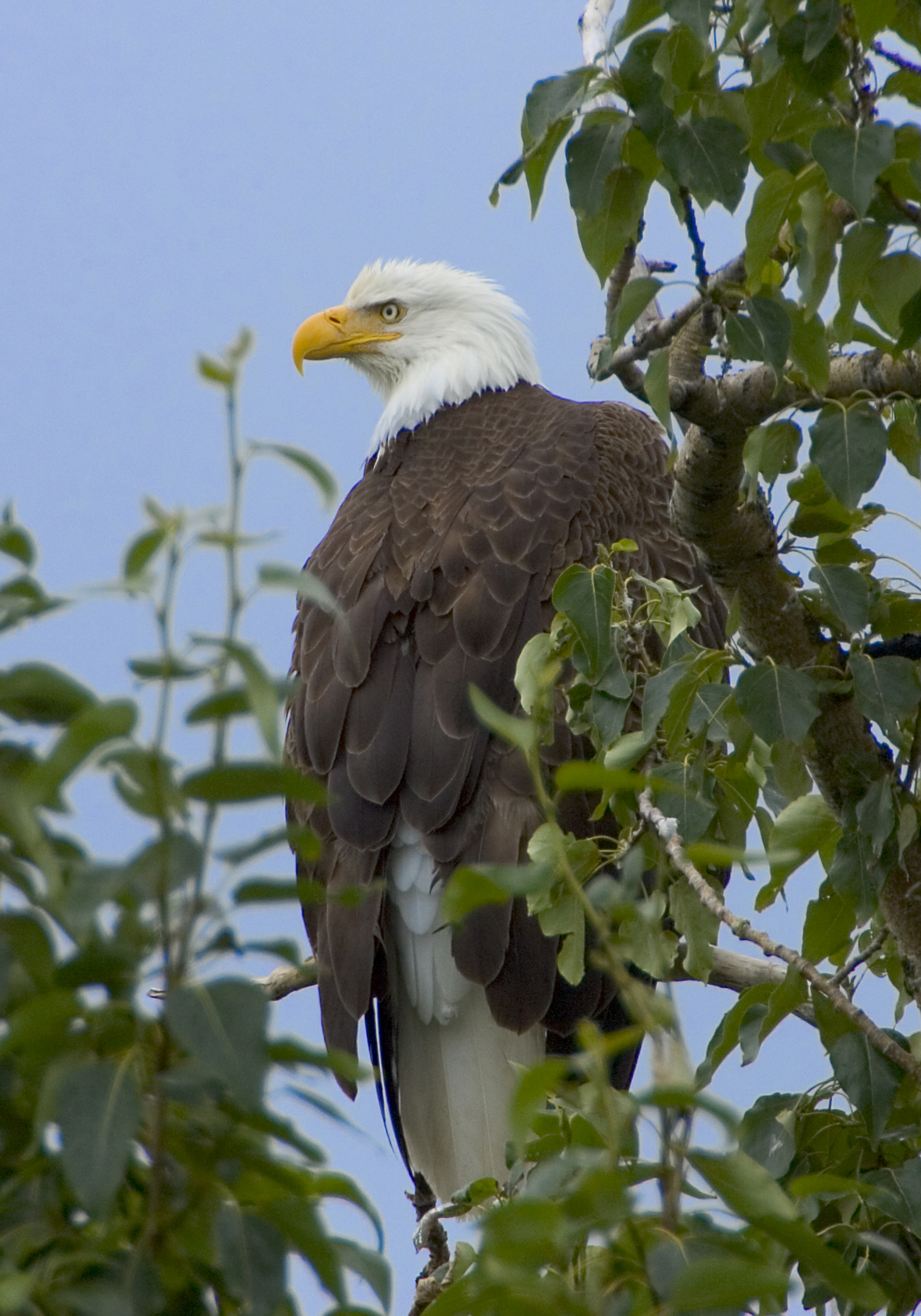
Rosehill's mascot is the Eagle.
