= Deckers (surname) =

Deckers is a surname mostly found in northwestern Europe. Notable people with the surname include:

- Daphne Deckers (born 1968), Dutch model
- Eugene Deckers (1917–1977), French actor
- Frans Deckers (1835–1916), Belgian sculptor
- Jan Deckers, philosopher, animal rights advocate
- Jeanine Deckers (1933–1985), Belgian singer-songwriter known as "The Singing Nun"

== See also ==
- Decker (surname)
- Dekkers (surname)
