= Tomball Independent School District =

School district in Texas, United States

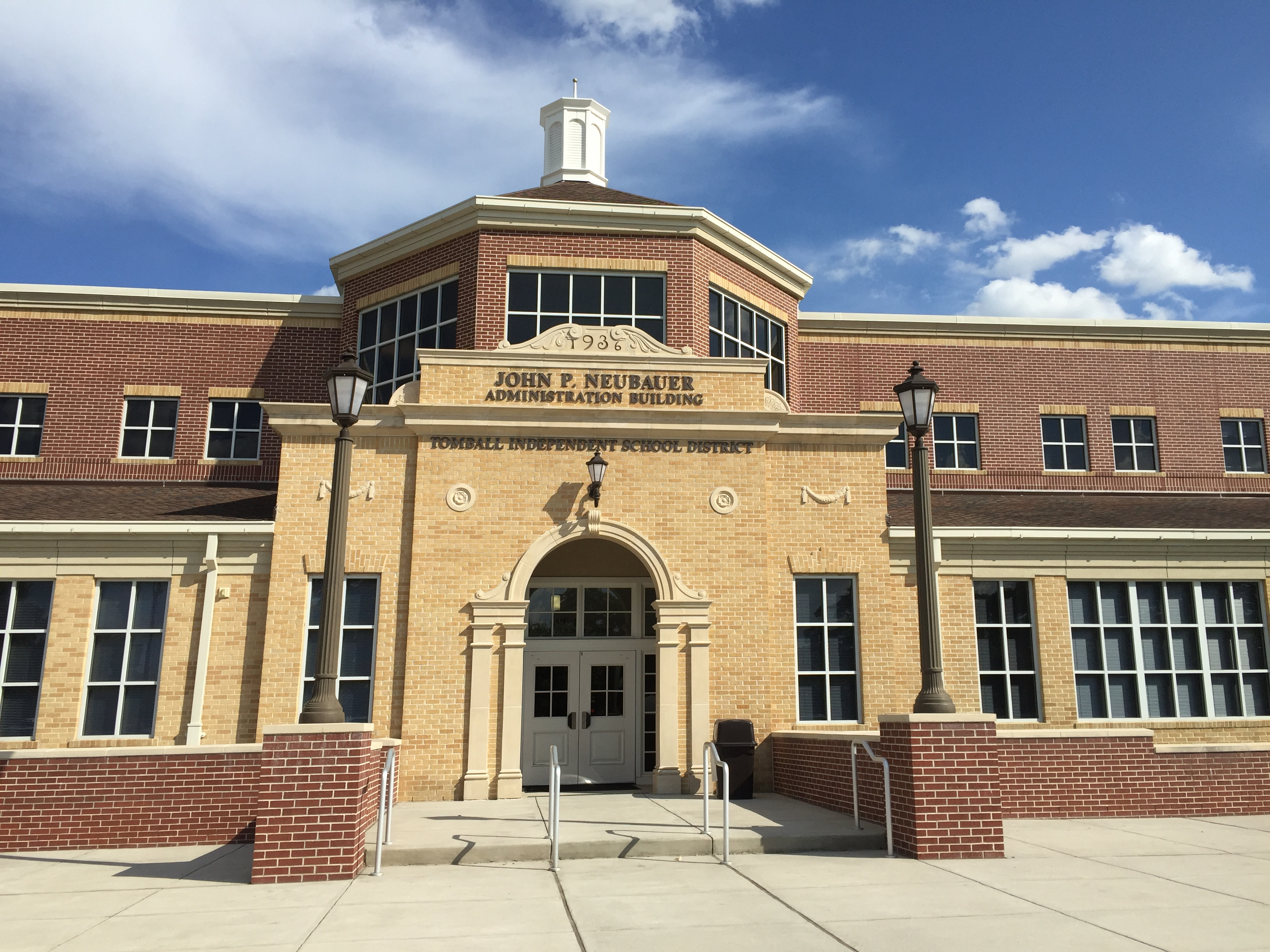
- Central Administration Building at 310 S. Cherry Street Tomball, TX

Address
- 310 South Cherry Street Tomball, Texas, 77375; United States

District information
- Type: Public
- Motto: Destination Excellence
- Grades: PK–12
- Established: April 1937; 89 years ago
- Superintendent: Martha Salazar-Zamora
- Accreditation: Texas Education Agency
- Schools: 3 High Schools; 4 Junior High Schools; 3 Intermediate Schools; 11 Elementary Schools
- Budget: $170.2 million (2017–2018)
- NCES District ID: 4842960

Students and staff
- Students: 22,273 (2023–2024)
- Teachers: 1,392.28 (on an FTE basis) (2023–2024)
- Staff: 1,376.49 (on an FTE basis) (2023–2024)
- Student–teacher ratio: 16.00 (2023–2024)

Tomball Independent School District is a K-12 education school district serving Tomball, Texas, United States as well as the surrounding area.

Tomball ISD encompasses 83 square miles in northwest Harris County and southwest Montgomery County, and is located approximately 30 miles from downtown Houston. As of 2022, the district has over 20,000 students at 22 campuses.

Tomball ISD serves students in northern Harris County and southwestern Montgomery County, Texas, including the City of Tomball, Lakewood Grove, Northepointe, Village Creek, Creekside Park Village (a section of The Woodlands), and the communities of Hufsmith, Decker Prairie, Pinehurst, and Rose Hill. Tomball ISD is approximately 20 miles northwest of Houston's central business district and 15 miles southwest of the Woodlands. Tomball ISD is bounded by Waller ISD to the west, Magnolia ISD to the north, Conroe ISD to the east, Klein ISD to the southeast, and Cypress-Fairbanks ISD to the southwest. As the principal crossroads of Tomball, FM 2920 (Tomball's Main Street) generally runs east-west through the center of the district, and SH 249 generally runs north-south through the center of the district. The Grand Parkway (SH 99) also runs east-west through the southern half of the district.

Tomball Independent School District is accredited by the Texas Education Agency, which rated it "A - Superior" in 2017–2018.

Tomball ISD is part of the taxation base for Lone Star College (formerly North Harris Montgomery Community College District).

== History ==
Public school was first taught in Tomball in 1908. Tomball Independent School District was established in 1937 after a new school house was built on Cherry Street in downtown Tomball in 1936. A dedicated high school was built on Main Street in downtown Tomball shortly after. This school was rebuilt in 1961 after a fire and is now Tomball Intermediate School. In 1974, a new high school was built on Quinn Road (then called Sandy Lane) at Zion Road on the north side of Tomball.

In 1981, voters overwhelmingly approved an $18.8 million bond to build three new elementary schools and double the size of the new Tomball High School campus.

Tomball Junior High School opened in 1993 across Quinn Road from Tomball High School.

In 2000, voters approved a $98 million bond to renovate Tomball High School and several other campuses and build Willow Wood Junior High, Northpointe Intermediate, and Rosehill Elementary schools and a natatorium across the street from Tomball Junior High School.

In 2007, voters approved a $198 million bond, which included funding for Tomball Memorial High School (the district's second high school) and Canyon Pointe, Creekside Forest, and Timber Creek elementary schools, as well as expansions and renovations at other schools and new district-level facilities, including a new district administrative building on the site of the district's 1936 school building on Cherry Street in downtown Tomball.

In May 2013, voters approved a $160 million bond to build four new schools (an intermediate and an elementary school in the Northpointe area and a junior high and an elementary school in the Creekside area), renovate all other schools, and upgrade the district stadium track and field next to Tomball HS and the field at Tomball Memorial HS. Approximately 1,900 voters approved the bond by a 2-to-1 margin. At the time, the district had 11,700 students.

In November 2017, voters approved Bond 2017 - a $275 million bond program that funded two new schools (Grand Oaks Elementary and Grand Lakes Jr High), an agricultural barn, a natatorium at Tomball Memorial HS, the Tomball ISD Stadium and Community Event Center complex at Cypress-Rosehill and the Grand Parkway, an expansion to Tomball Memorial High School, and renovations to Tomball Intermediate School. The funds were also utilized for instructional technology, school buses, and land purchases as well as the installation of utilities. Approximately 3,600 voters voted on Bond 2017, which passed by roughly 1700 votes.

In 2018, Tomball ISD was named as a finalist in the 17th Annual H-E-B Excellence in Education Awards program in the large school district division. The award recognizes outstanding school districts demonstrating a commitment to student achievement through innovative programs, parent and community involvement, and professional development opportunities for teachers and administrators.

In November 2021, voters approved Propositions A and B of Bond 2021 - a $494.5 million bond program that will fund four new schools (two elementary, one intermediate, and a third high school) and facilities, including the purchase of the former BJ Services Headquarters building now called the Eastside Complex (which will become the Tomball Innovation Center and, as of January 2023, is the new home for Tomball Star Academy) and a pre-K center, infrastructure, renovations, transportation, technology for staff and students as well as security updates. Voters did not approve Propositions C, D, and E of Bond 2021, which would have provided an additional $73.1 million for athletic facility upgrades, a natatorium at the third high school, and a new fine arts/athletics multi-use facility at each of the three high schools. Propositions A and B received roughly 57% approval, and Propositions C, D, and E received roughly 47% approval. Approximately 8,600 voters voted on Bond 2021, with Propositions A and B each passing by roughly 1200 votes and Propositions C, D, and E each failing to pass by roughly 500 votes.

On October 10, 2022, the district broke ground on the Jeurgen Road complex, between Mueschke Rd and Cypress-Rosehill Rd on the western edge of the district that will include the new high school, the intermediate school, and one of the elementary schools approved in Bond 2021. The other elementary school was to be built at the Eastside Complex. In May 2023, the district announced that the elementary school planned for the Eastside Complex would instead be an intermediate school to relieve Creekside Park Junior High and the elementary schools in its feeder pattern. This Intermediate School #5 would have made all the elementary schools in the district serve grades K-4 and all the junior highs serve grades 7-8. In December 2023, in response to parent protests, TISD decided to expand Creekside Park Junior High to include grades 5-8 instead of building a new intermediate school outside of the Creekside Park Village area.

In May 2025, Tomball ISD voters approved a $429 million bond referendum, composed of four propositions, all of which were approved by 55-63% of the voters. The bond included funding for the construction of a second Pre-K center and a replacement campus for Tomball Intermediate School at the Eastside Complex, as well as the purchase of property for a future 13th elementary school. Funding was also included for campus and infrastructure upgrades, new buses, expansion of the district transportation center, new CTE programs, conversion of the current Tomball Intermediate campus into a Special Services center, new turf athletic fields, updates to the Tomball High School "Cougar Country" stadium (which serves as the District track stadium), and new indoor Multi-Program Activity Centers at each high school, in part to allow for athletic activities under new state heat safety restrictions.

In September 2023, Tomball ISD's superintendent, Martha Salazar-Zamora, was named Superintendent of the Year (SOTY) by the Texas Association of School Boards.

== Community Events ==
Between 1964 and 1974, Tomball ISD presented a "Spring Festival" at the high school auditorium on Main Street that involved all grades and included a Coronation Ceremony, talent show, and musical and theatrical performances.

Since 1981, the district has presented a "Patriotic Show" during a football game each season to honor military members and veterans in the Tomball community with a combined band and drill team performance, a veterans dinner and on-field salute, and fireworks. Since the opening of Tomball Memorial High School in 2011, the Patriotic Show has been presented at the Tomball-Tomball Memorial rivalry game. 2022 marked the 42nd presentation of the Patriotic Show.

Since 2007, Tomball High School conducts a homecoming parade down Main Street in downtown Tomball during Homecoming Week. Tomball Memorial High School also conducts a homecoming parade around the Memorial High School campus each year.

== Population Growth ==
Tomball ISD largely served just the City of Tomball and its surrounding rural area until the early 2000s, when expansion of the northwest Houston suburbs and The Woodlands reached the district boundaries, bringing suburban developments into the district. The two suburban population centers in the district, Northpointe/Oakcrest in the south and The Woodlands' Village of Creekside Park in the east, have accelerated the district's growth, making it a "Fast Growth" district since around 2010. Starting in 2020, suburban real estate demand driven by the COVID pandemic increased development activity throughout the district with thousands of new homes expected to be built in the district by 2030.

| Year | Students | Tomball City Pop. | District Pop. | Harris County Pop. |
|---|---|---|---|---|
| 1908 | 15 | | | 115,693 |
| 1916 | 62 | 150 | | 186,667 |
| 1940 | 249 | 660 | | 528,961 |
| 1960 | | 1,713 | | 1,243,160 |
| 1970 | 1,246 | 2,734 | | 1,741,910 |
| 1990 | 4,500 | 6,370 | | 2,818,200 |
| 2000 | 7,002 | | | 3,414,000 |
| 2010 | 10,669 | 10,753 | 55,838 | 4,092,495 |
| 2013 | 11,700 | 11,200 | 59,119 | 4,284,066 |
| 2015 | 14,092 | 11,500 | 61,825 | 4,411,805 |
| 2017 | 18,500 | 11,900 | 63,711 | 4,539,542 |
| 2021 | 20,262 | 12,341 | 88,548 | 4,795,014 |
| 2023 | 22,274 | 14,392 | 96,474 | 4,903,000 |
| 2025 | 23,283 | 15,858 | | 5,115,154 |

== Board of trustees ==
| Position | Official | Title | Elected |
|---|---|---|---|
| Board of Trustees, Position 1 | Tina Salem | Trustee | November 2022 |
| Board of Trustees, Position 2 | Michael Pratt | Trustee | November 2022 |
| Board of Trustees, Position 3 | John E. McStravick | Vice President | November 2022 |
| Board of Trustees, Position 4 | Mark Lewandowski | Assistant Secretary | November 2022 |
| Board of Trustees, Position 5 | Matt Schiel | Trustee | November 2020 |
| Board of Trustees, Position 6 | Justin Unser | Secretary | November 2020 |
| Board of Trustees, Position 7 | Lee L. McLeod | President | November 2020 |

== Administration ==
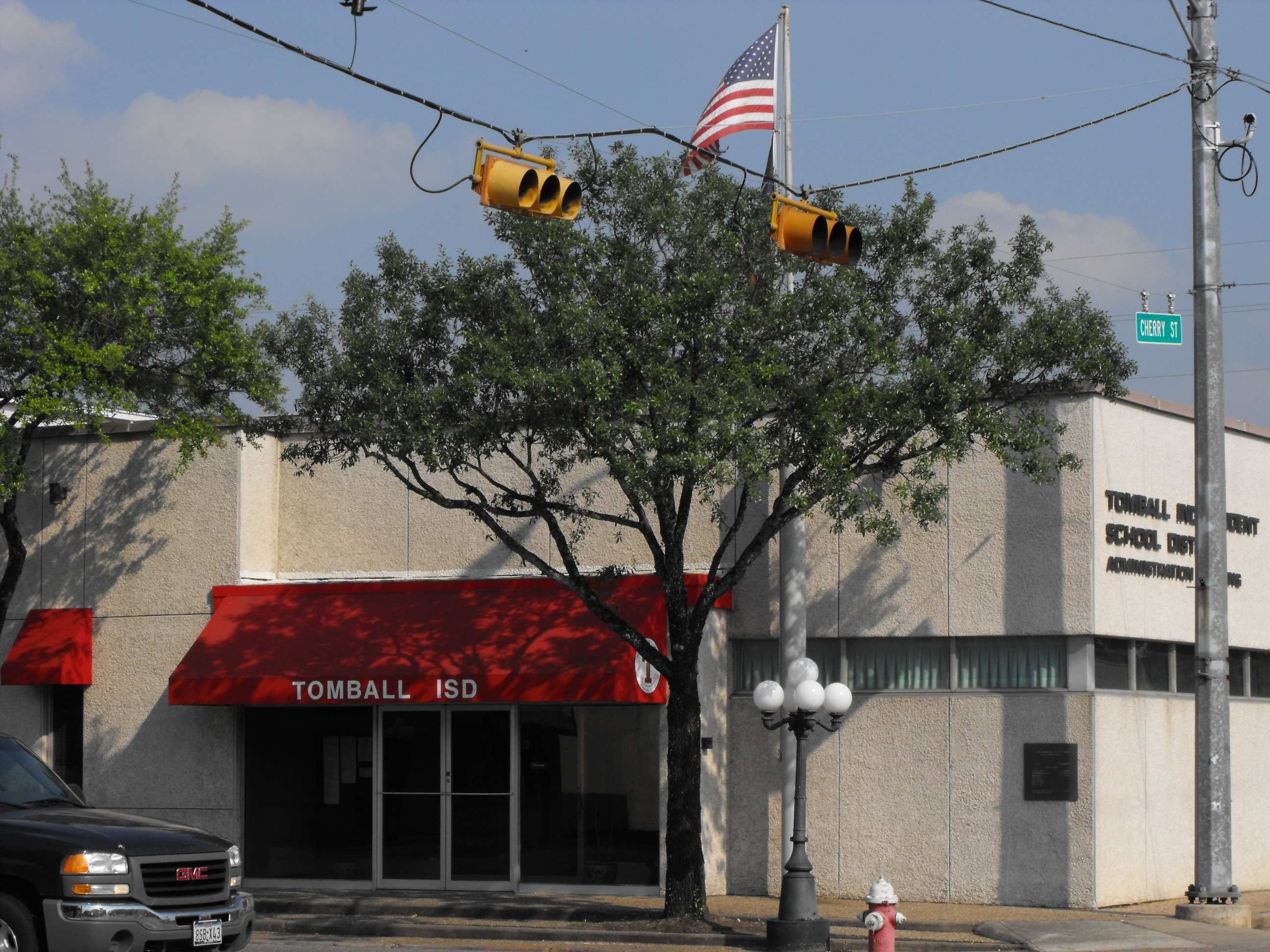
Former Tomball ISD Administration Office building located at the corner of Cherry Street and West Main Street (FM 2920).

| Position | Official | Title |
|---|---|---|
| Superintendent of Schools | Martha Salazar-Zamora | |
| Chief Financial Officer | Zach Boles | |
| Chief of Staff and Head of Schools | Amy Schindewolf | |
| Chief Academic Officer | Michael Webb | |
| Chief Operations Officer | Steven Gutierrez | |
| Assistant Superintendent | Mindy Munoz | Secondary Schools |
| Assistant Superintendent | George Flores | Elementary Schools |
| Assistant Superintendent | Lee Wright | Strategic Innovation |
| Assistant Superintendent | Mark White | Accountability and Governmental Relations |
| Assistant Superintendent | Alicia Reeves | Human Talent |
| General Counsel | Holly Sherman | |

== Campuses ==
| High Schools | Principal | 2021-2022 Enrollment | Grades | Opened |
|---|---|---|---|---|
| Tomball High School | Kimberley McKinney | 2,567 | 9-12 | 1974 |
| Tomball Memorial High School | Jennifer Collier | 2,763 | 9-12 | 2011 |
| Tomball Star Academy | Victoria Brinkman | 350 | 9-12 | 2017 |
| Tomball West High School | Kevin Williams | N/A | 9-10 | 2026 |

| Junior High Schools | Principal | 2021-2022 Enrollment | Grades | Opened |
|---|---|---|---|---|
| Creekside Park Junior High | Tara Bailey | 752 | 6-8 (Adding 5th in 2026) | 2016 |
| Tomball Junior High | Charlie Gerszewski | 798 | 7-8 | 1993 |
| Willow Wood Junior High | Kelly Marchiando | 831 | 7-8 | 2003 |
| Grand Lakes Junior High | Jackie Santos | 939 | 7-8 | 2021 |

| Intermediate Schools | Principal | 2021-2022 Enrollment | Grades | Opened |
|---|---|---|---|---|
| Northpointe Intermediate | Holly Searcy | 737 | 5-6 | 2003 |
| Oakcrest Intermediate | Sara Rush | 760 | 5-6 | 2015 |
| Tomball Intermediate | Tylene Hicks | 894 | 5-6 | 1993* |
| West Intermediate | Caitlin Cain | N/A | 5-6 | 2025 |

| Elementary Schools | Principal | 2021-2022 Enrollment | Grades | Opened |
|---|---|---|---|---|
| Canyon Pointe Elementary | Karina Avila | 768 | PK-4 | 2008 |
| Creekside Forest Elementary | Treva Madore | 476 | PK-5 | 2009 |
| Creekview Elementary | Allyson Jordan | 859 | PK-5 | 2015 |
| Decker Prairie Elementary | Tammy Sebesta | 736 | PK-4 | 1983 |
| Grand Oaks Elementary | Erin Johnson | 880 | PK-4 | 2020 |
| Lakewood Elementary | Deanna Porter | 814 | PK-4 | 1983 |
| Rosehill Elementary | Gabriela Avellaneda | 655 | PK-4 | 2003 |
| Timber Creek Elementary | Lauren Thompson | 620 | K-5 | 2012 |
| Tomball Elementary | Melissa Baudoin | 816 | PK-4 | 1998 |
| Wildwood Elementary | Letty Roman | 835 | PK-4 | 2015 |
| Willow Creek Elementary | Teresa Sullivan | 737 | PK-4 | 1998 |
| West Elementary | Chad Schmidt | N/A | PK-4 | 2024 |

| Specialty Schools | Principal | 2021-2022 Enrollment | Grades | Opened |
|---|---|---|---|---|
| Connections Academy | Robert Frost | N/A | On-line | N/A |
| Early Excellence Academy | Jessica Perez | N/A | Pre-K | 2023 |

- The former Beckendorf Intermediate School was built in 1979 at the northeast corner of Quinn Road and Baker Drive, just south of Tomball High School, but was permanently closed and demolished in 2011 after a fault line was discovered under the school in 2004.
- The Tomball Intermediate School campus was the district's high school campus from 1938 to 1974, when the new Tomball High School campus opened. It served as a junior high campus until the new Tomball Junior High campus opened in 1993, at which point it became an intermediate campus. The campus was expanded in 2009 to accommodate the closure of Beckendorf Intermediate School.
- In 2023, TISD made plans to move intermediate school grades of the Creekside Village area to Tomball by building a new intermediate school at Tomball Innovation Center, but parents protested as they felt the proposed school was too far from Creekside Village. The district shifted and decided instead to move the fifth grade to an addition at Creekside Park Junior High School. The directors of The Woodlands Township had asked that TISD not move the middle school students to Tomball.

== Feeder patterns ==
| High School | Junior High School | Intermediate School | Elementary |
|---|---|---|---|
| Tomball Memorial High School | Willow Wood Junior High School, Grand Lakes Junior High School (Partial) | Northpointe Intermediate, Oakcrest Intermediate | Canyon Pointe Elementary, Lakewood Elementary, Willow Creek Elementary, Wildwood Elementary, Grand Oaks Elementary (partial) |
| Tomball High School | Creekside Park Junior High School, Tomball Junior High School, Grand Lakes Junior High School (Partial) | Tomball Intermediate | Creekside Forest Elementary, Creekview Elementary, Decker Prairie Elementary, Rosehill Elementary, Timber Creek Elementary, Tomball Elementary, Grand Oaks Elementary (partial) |
| Tomball West High School (Anticipated Feeder Pattern) | Grand Lakes Junior High | West Intermediate, Oakcrest Intermediate (partial) | West Elementary, Rosehill Elementary, Grand Oaks Elementary, Decker Prairie (partial), Wildwood Elementary (partial) |
| Tomball Star Academy | District-wide coverage by application | | |

In 2010, the school district was rated "Recognized" by the Texas Education Agency.

== See also ==
- List of school districts in Texas
