= Northwestern Oklahoma State Rangers =

Collegiate athletic teams of Northwestern Oklahoma State University

- University: Northwestern Oklahoma State University
- NCAA: Division II
- Conference: Great American (primary)
- Athletic director: Brad Franz
- Location: Alva, Oklahoma
- Varsity teams: 16
- Football stadium: Ranger Field
- Basketball arena: Percefull Fieldhouse
- Baseball stadium: Myers Stadium
- Soccer stadium: Alva Recreational Complex
- Nickname: Rangers
- Colors: Black and red
- Mascot: Rowdy Ranger
- Fight song: Ride, Rangers, Ride
- Website: riderangersride.com
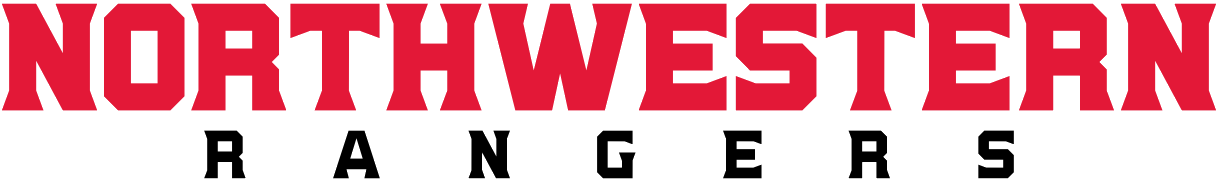

The Northwestern Oklahoma State Rangers (also known as NWOSU Rangers) are the athletic teams that represent Northwestern Oklahoma State University, located in Alva, Oklahoma, in intercollegiate sports as a member of the Division II ranks of the National Collegiate Athletic Association (NCAA), primarily competing in the Great American Conference (GAC) since the 2012–13 academic year. The Rangers previously competed in the Sooner Athletic Conference of the National Association of Intercollegiate Athletics (NAIA) from 2001–02 to 2011–12; in the Red River Athletic Conference (RRAC) from 1998–99 to 2000–01; as an NAIA Independent during the 1997–98 school year; in the Oklahoma Intercollegiate Conference (OIC) from 1974–75 to 1996–97.

== Move to NCAA Division II ==
On May 11, 2011, Northwestern Oklahoma State announced that they had accepted an invitation to the Great American Conference for all sports in the 2012–13 academic year and would begin their transition from the NAIA to NCAA Division II. On July 12, 2011, Northwestern Oklahoma State University was denied admittance into the NCAA Division II Membership Process for the 2011–12 cycle; the school was accepted into the membership process one year later.

Schools must complete a membership process, spanning 3 years, before gaining active status and becoming eligible for championship competition. On July 17, 2015, the NCAA announced that effective September 1, 2015, the school had become active Division II members.

== National championships ==
=== Team ===
Sport	Association	Division	Year	Opponent/Runner-up	Score
Football (1)	NAIA	Division I	1999	Georgetown (KY)	34–26

== Varsity teams ==
NWOSU competes in 16 intercollegiate varsity sports: Men's sports include baseball, basketball, cheerleading, cross country, football, golf and rodeo; while women's sports include basketball, cheerleading, cross country, golf, rodeo, soccer, softball and volleyball.

=== Softball ===
The Ranger softball team appeared in one Women's College World Series in 1976.

=== Track and field ===
On January 26, 2018, following a 30-year absence from competition, Northwestern Director of Athletics Brad Franz announced that the school would be adding women's track & field to its varsity sports. The team competed in its first event February 1, 2019, at the Wichita State Invitational under head coach Jill Lancaster.

== Alumni ==
- Patrick Crayton – National Football League player (Dallas Cowboys) (San Diego Chargers)
- Mike Hargrove – Major League Baseball player/manager
- Bryan Henderson – Arena Football League player
- Ron Moore – National Football League player (Atlanta Falcons)
- Chip Myers – National Football League player (Cincinnati Bengals)
- Gaylon Nickerson – National Basketball Association player
- Gary Porter – Arena Football League player Texas Terror
- Lynn Scott – National Football League player (Dallas Cowboys)
- Brian Sochia – National Football League player (Miami and Denver)
- Korey Williams – Canadian Football League player (Saskatchewan Roughriders)
