= Main Street Crossing =

Coordinates: 30.0977°N 95.6144°W

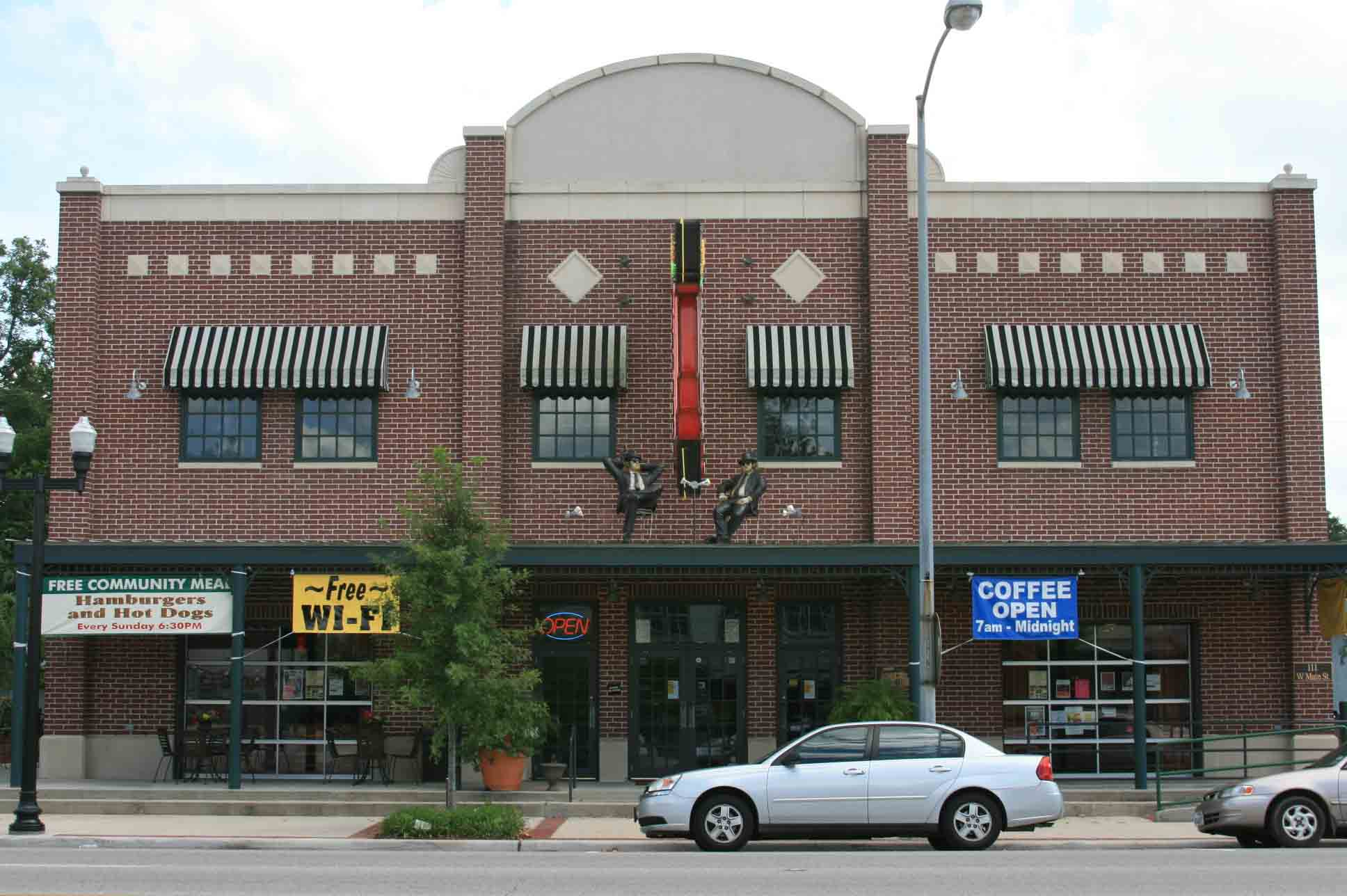
- Interactive map of Main Street Crossing
- Address: 111 W Main St, Tomball, TX 77375
- Location: Old TownTomball, Texas
- Capacity: 180-person
- Type: Nonprofit community center, church, and concert hall

Construction
- Opened: 2004

Website
- mainstreetcrossing.com

Main Street Crossing is a listening room, concert hall, community center, church, private venue, and nonprofit organization located in historic Old Town Tomball, Texas, outside of Houston.

== About ==
Main Street Crossing was founded by Rick Davis and his wife Terri. The music venue opened in 2004. Their son Matt Davis, who is also a songwriter, is the general manager.

Main Street Crossing is located inside a building built in 2004. It was designed like an early 20th century two-story grocery store that was on the property. The building has high ceilings, a brick exterior, a balcony and a 10-foot illuminated marquee that displays upcoming events. There is a plaque on an outside wall of the building commemorating the store. The building has a 180-person capacity. It is listed as a 501(c)(3) tax-exempt nonprofit organization.

The music venue is also a full-service restaurant. In November 2014, Main Street Crossing was featured in the Houston Chronicle regarding the repeal of a 70-year liquor ban in Old Town Tomball. The removal of the ban helps local business culture within the town.

Main Street Crossing was founded as a community center for spiritual and charitable activities. It is a meeting place for three local Tomball churches: The Journey, Well Spring, and Sondays. The church services are informal and patrons are able to buy beer and wine from the venue.

== Music ==
It was listed as one of the Houston Press's "10 Best Music Venues Outside Loop 610" and as one of "Houston's 10 Best Singer-Songwriter Stages."

Main Street Crossing hosts bands of all genres, but the majority are Texas country music bands. Notable acts that have performed at Main Street Crossing include Asleep at the Wheel, Randy Rogers, Michael Martin Murphey, Junior Brown, Joe Ely, Kinky Friedman, Radney Foster, Ray Wylie Hubbard, Gary P. Nunn, Cory Morrow, Billy Joe Shaver, Band of Heathens, Hal Ketchum, Carolyn Wonderland, Todd Snider, James McMurtry, Roger Creager, Folk Family Revival, Jason Boland, Brandon Rhyder, Bob Schneider, Owen Temple, and Alejandro Escovedo.

Main Street Crossing hosts the radio show Texas Mix 105.3. In August 2012, they introduced the listening-room monthly event "Songtelling—The Marrow of a Song" where artists give extended interviews on the stories behind their songs.
