= Chris Adams (general) =

United States general (born 1930)

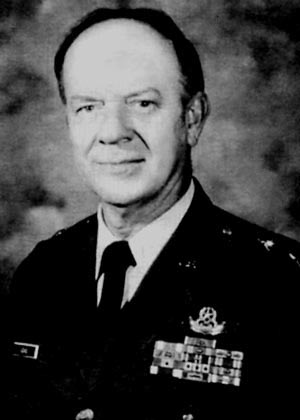
- Born: July 8, 1930 (age 96); Shreveport, Louisiana
- Military career
- Allegiance: United States
- Branch: United States Air Force
- Rank: Major general

Christopher S. Adams, Jr. (born July 8, 1930) is an American author and retired United States Air Force officer.

== Early life and education ==
Adams graduated from Tomball High School, Tarleton State University, Texas A&M University-Commerce and the Industrial College of the Armed Forces.

== Air Force career ==
During his US Air Force career, he served as a wing commander, air division commander and senior staff officer with the Defense Nuclear Agency and the Joint Chiefs of Staff. He is a Command Pilot and Vietnam veteran, and logged over 8,000 hours in a variety of aircraft including the B-36, B-52, C-141 and C-47 ‘Gooney Bird’ in Vietnam.

During his military career he received the Distinguished Service Medal, the Department of Defense Meritorious Service Medal, two Legions of Merit, two Air Medals for service in Vietnam combat and numerous other awards; as well as the Daughters of the American Revolution Medal of Honor.

== Civilian career ==
Adams retired from the Air Force with the grade of major general and chief of staff, Strategic Air Command in 1983 to accept an appointment as associate director at Los Alamos National Laboratory. He later joined Andrew Corporation as vice president of government systems, where he spent fifteen years and traveled extensively in Saudi Arabia, China and the Soviet Union, including 23 extended visits to Russia, Ukraine and Belarus.

== Public service and writing ==
Adams served with numerous government agencies and university foundations, and was appointed by Texas Governor Rick Perry to serve on the Brazos River Authority Board of Directors. He is the author of ten books on the Cold War, three non-fiction and seven spy novels.

== Bibliography ==
- Adams, Chris (December 2002), Profiles In Betrayal: The Enemy Within, iUniverse, ISBN 0-595-25277-X
- —— (March 2004), The Betrayal Mosaic: A Cold War Spy Story, New York: iUniverse, Inc., ISBN 0-595-30913-5
- —— (May 2006), Out of Darkness: The Last Russian Revolution, iUniverse, ISBN 0-595-39755-7
- —— (July 2001), Ideologies in Conflict: A Cold War Docu-Story, San Jose: Writer's Showcase, ISBN 0-595-18963-6
- —— (December 2004), Inside The Cold War: A Cold Warrior's Reflections, University Press of the Pacific, ISBN 1-4102-1891-0
- —— (September 2000), Red Eagle: A Story of Cold War Espionage, iUniverse, ISBN 0-595-13159-X
