= American National Carbide =

American manufacturer (1970–2012)

- Type: Privately held company
- Industry: Manufacturing
- Founded: 1970
- Headquarters: Tomball, Texas
- Key people: D. Greg Stroud, President & CEO
- Products: Tungsten carbide products

American National Carbide was a privately held company that manufactured tungsten carbide products and was headquartered in Tomball, Texas, which is just northwest of Houston. Also known as "ANC," the company specialized in the production of finished carbide tools for metalworking, rock drilling, and wear applications and was one of a few companies worldwide that was able to recycle tungsten carbide scrap into raw material. ANC, a member of the United States Cutting Tool Institute, was founded in 1970 and sold its products worldwide.

In June 2012, American National Carbide announced a $2.5 million expansion of its raw material production operation.

In January 2023, ANC was forced to cease operations permanently. In August 2023, the company's principal owner, Greg Stroud, announced the launch of a newly formed entity, a manufacturer/distributor called AmeriServ Supply, which was established to service customers of American National Carbide by providing tungsten carbide cutting and wear products formerly produced by ANC.

== Production ==
American National Carbide products:

- ISO- and ANSI-standard indexable metalworking inserts for turning, milling, threading, grooving, drilling and parting applications
- ISO- and ANSI-standard shims and chipbreakers for metalworking operations
- Unfinished blanks for metalworking inserts and brazed tools
- Inserts for rock drilling and mining, including compacts, nozzles, stabilizers, and hardfacing material
- Cutting and wear products for the primary and secondary wood processing industries
- Specialized cutting tools for brake drum turning, railwheel truing, bar peeling, and small hole boring
- Blended tungsten carbide-cobalt powders for cemented carbide manufacturers and the plasma spray industry
