= Decker Prairie, Texas =

Unincorporated community in Texas, US

Coordinates: 30°07′52″N 95°39′09″W

Decker Prairie is an unincorporated community in Montgomery County, Texas, United States. The community is named for Isaac Decker, who settled in the area circa 1839.

== Education ==
Tomball Independent School District operates schools in the area. Zoned schools include:

- Decker Prairie Elementary School
- Tomball Intermediate School
- Tomball Junior High School
- Tomball High School

Lone Star College (originally the North Harris Montgomery Community College District) serves the community. The territory in Tomball ISD joined the community college district in 1982. The system operates the Fairbanks Center in unincorporated Harris County; Fairbanks Center is a part of Lone Star College–CyFair.
