= Decker =

Decker can refer to:

== Names ==
- Decker (surname)

== Places ==
Antarctica

- Decker Glacier

Canada

- Decker, Manitoba
- Decker Lake (British Columbia), a lake near the town of Burns Lake, British Columbia
- Decker Lake, British Columbia, a community on that lake

United States

- Decker, Indiana, a town
- Decker, Wisconsin, an unincorporated community
- Decker Corner, Wisconsin, an unincorporated community
- Decker Peak, a mountain in Idaho
- Decker Prairie, Texas
- Deckertown, New Jersey
- Deckerville, Michigan
- Deckers, Colorado

== Entertainment ==
- Black+Decker, an American manufacturer of power tools, accessories, hardware, home improvement products, home appliances and fastening systems
- Decker, a term for a computer hacker in the Shadowrun universe
- Decker (TV series), an American comedy web and television series starring Tim Heidecker and Gregg Turkington
- Ultraman Decker, a 2022 Japanese tokusatsu television series

== Other ==
- Double decker bus, a bus which has two decks (floors) for passengers
- Forster–Decker method, a series of chemical reactions that transform a primary amine ultimately to a secondary amine

== See also ==
- Deckers (disambiguation)
- Dekker
