= Louk Dekkers =

Dutch footballer (born 1998)

Personal information
- Date of birth: 3 March 1998 (age 28)
- Place of birth: Hilversum, Netherlands
- Height: 1.77 m (5 ft 10 in)
- Position: Midfielder

Youth career
- 2009–2017: HC & FC Victoria
- 2009–2017: Utrecht

Senior career*
Years	Team	Apps	(Gls)
2017–2018	Jong Utrecht	10	(0)
2018–2020	Koninklijke HFC	19	(0)
2020–2022	Swift	4	(0)
- * Club domestic league appearances and goals as of 11 November 2020

Louk Dekkers (born 3 March 1998) is a Dutch football player who most recently played for AVV Swift in the Dutch Hoofdklasse.

== Club career ==
He made his Eerste Divisie debut for Jong FC Utrecht on 22 September 2017 in a game against RKC Waalwijk. In 2020, Dekkers joined Swift from fellow amateur side Koninklijke HFC.
