= Jan Deckers =

Belgian philosopher (born 1970)

- Born: 1970 (age 54–55)
- Occupation: Moral philosopher
- Employer: Newcastle University

Jan Deckers (born 1970) works in bioethics at Newcastle University. His work revolves mainly around three topics: animal ethics, reproductive ethics and embryo research, and ethics of genetics.

== Animal ethics ==
Deckers has published numerous articles in animal ethics, mainly on the ethical issues associated with the human consumption of animal products. This topic has been approached from various angles, including its connections with the causation of harm to animals, environmental degradation, climate change, and the emergence and spread of zoonoses. Early work also considered the relevance of the philosophy of Alfred North Whitehead for animal ethics, where Deckers's work has been reviewed critically by other Whiteheadian scholars. More recent work has also considered the ethics of in-vitro flesh and the idea of creating animals with decreased pain sensitivity, where Deckers chaired a conference on these themes, funded by the Wellcome Trust.

As a speciesist, Deckers argues that human health is paramount to address whether and when animal products ought to be consumed. The book Animal (De)liberation: Should the Consumption of Animal Products Be Banned? defends 'qualified moral veganism', which is associated with a political goal: the vegan project.

The book is critical of positions adopted by other scholars, including Alasdair Cochrane, Gary Francione, Martha Nussbaum, and Peter Singer, and has more in common with the positions of scholars such as Alice Crary, Melanie Joy, and Marti Kheel.

Many charges have been pressed against vegan diets, for example that they alienate human beings from nature (Michael Pollan) or that they increase human food security and other sustainability concerns relative to other diets (Simon Fairlie). Deckers addresses these challenges. The book’s appendix also considers whether vegan diets might be nutritionally adequate or even superior compared to other diets.

The book has been described as ‘an innovative defense of veganism’ because of its concern with maximising positive global health impacts, and its primary focus on safeguarding the health of moral agents.

== Reproductive ethics and embryo research ==
Deckers has analysed debate in Westminster Parliament around the use of embryos for stem cell research and cloning as well as the law on abortion in Great Britain, and argued for legal reform. In the debate on abortion, Deckers has engaged with Judith Jarvis Thomson's thought experiment of the violinist. In an article with the title 'The right to life and abortion legislation in England and Wales: A proposal for change’, Deckers argues for a radical overhaul of the law on abortion in England and Wales. His work in this area has been the subject of significant academic critique.

== Ethics of genetics ==
In his article ‘Are scientists right and non-scientists wrong? Reflections on discussions of GM’ Deckers analyses the views of scientists and non-scientists on genetic engineering. In a comprehensive overview of the literature between 1975 and 2008, the article was identified as a key paper in the debate on the ethics of GM crops. More recent work reflects on the meaning and the moral significance or otherwise of the (un)natural, where Deckers argues, inspired by Alfred North Whitehead’s teleological understanding of natural entities, that the concept of the unnatural carries both meaning and moral significance in discussions of genetic engineering. At the same time, his (ontological) understanding of the world is critical of Whitehead's thought by rejecting the view that the universe as a whole is a teleological entity. Deckers also developed a contextualised case in human genetics as a teaching resource for Advance Higher Education.

== Other work ==
In a book chapter on 'Fairness in Newcastle: Theory and Practice’, Deckers engages with a report of the Newcastle Fairness Commission, published in 2012, which set out to define some principles of fairness to improve decision-making and guide the work of Newcastle City Council and other organisations in the city. He has also published on ethics related to artificial intelligence.

== Academic and wider recognition ==
At the 7th World Congress of Bioethics, Sydney, November 2004, Deckers received the Honourable Mention 2004 Mark S. Ehrenreich Prize for Healthcare Ethics Research of the International Association of Bioethics and the Pacific Center for Health Policy and Ethics at the University of Southern California. In 2014 Deckers was awarded a 'Society and Ethics' grant from the Wellcome Trust to convene a conference on 'An ethical discussion of in-vitro meat and the production of flesh from animals with enhanced properties.' In 2021 he received a grant from the Great Britain Sasakawa Foundation for work on the ethics of artificial intelligence.

Deckers has also contributed to the popular literature and media.
