= Joey Dekkers =

Dutch footballer (born 1989)

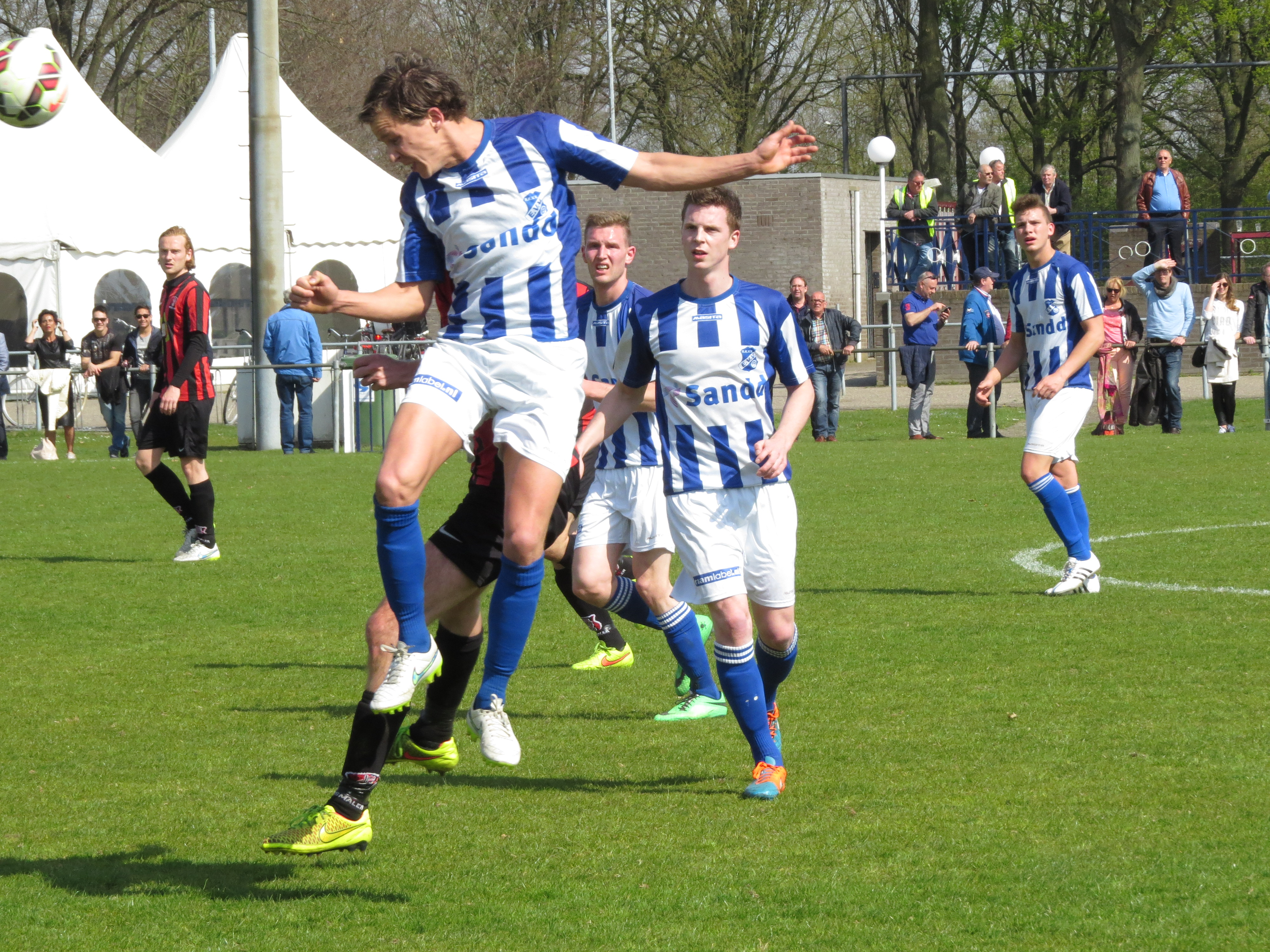
- Dekkers with EVV in 2015

Personal information
- Date of birth: 3 October 1989 (age 37)
- Place of birth: Tegelen, Netherlands
- Height: 1.77 m (5 ft 10 in)
- Position: Midfielder

Youth career
- SC Irene

Senior career*
Years	Team	Apps	(Gls)
–2011	SC Irene		
2011–2012	SVC 2000		
2012–2015	EVV	85	(0)
2015–2017	Achilles '29	60	(1)
2017–2018	EVV	24	(1)
2018–2019	Achilles '29	32	(1)
2019–2021	De Treffers	26	(0)
2021–2023	Groene Ster	46	(3)
- * Club domestic league appearances and goals as of 17:01, 7 April 2023 (UTC)

Joey Dekkers (born 3 October 1989) is a Dutch retired footballer who played as a midfielder.

== Club career ==
Dekkers moved into professional football relatively late at 25 years, after joining Achilles '29 in 2015 from amateur side EVV. Before that, the left-sided midfielder played for SVC 2000 and Sportclub Irene.

He made his professional debut in the Eerste Divisie for Achilles '29 on 7 August 2015 in a game against Jong Ajax and scored a winning goal in a 2–1 victory for Achilles. In 2017, he suffered relegation with Achilles '29 from the Eerste Divisie, after which he returned to EVV in the Derde Divisie. In 2018, he returned to Achilles '29, at that time also competing in the Derde Divisie. After Achilles '29 suffered another relegation, Dekkers moved to fellow Groesbeek club De Treffers in June 2019, playing in the third-tier Tweede Divisie. In February 2021 Groene Ster confirmed, that Dekkers would join the club ahead of the upcoming 2021-22 season.
