= Kevin Dekkers =

Association football player (born 1980)

Personal information
- Date of birth: 9 December 1980 (age 45)
- Place of birth: Bandon, County Cork, Ireland
- Position: Midfielder

Youth career
- Drinagh Rangers
- Cork City

International career^{‡}
Years	Team	Apps	(Gls)
2009–2016	Sint Maarten (futsal)	6	
2016	Sint Maarten	3	(0)
- ‡ National team caps and goals as of 11:00, 3 September 2020 (UTC)

Kevin Dekkers (born 9 December 1980) is a footballer who plays as a midfielder. Born in Ireland, he made three appearances for the Sint Maarten national team.

== International career ==
Dekkers was born in County Cork, Ireland to a Dutch father and Sint Maartener mother, who ensured that Kevin maintained his Sint Maartenese citizenship. He moved to the island itself in 2004, and worked as a PE teacher, playing in the local league. He was called up to the Sint Maarten senior squad for a friendly against Anguilla, and captained the side to a 2–0 victory. He also played in 2017 Caribbean Cup qualification games against Grenada and the United States Virgin Islands.

== Career statistics ==
As of match played 7 May 2017

National team	Year	Apps	Goals
Sint Maarten	2016	3	0
Total		3	0
