= Decker Lake (British Columbia) =

- Location within British Columbia
- Location: British Columbia, Canada
- Coordinates: 54°17′35″N 125°50′43″W
- Type: lake
- Primary inflows: Decker Creek

Decker Lake is a lake in the Bulkley River drainage of northwestern British Columbia, Canada. It lies immediately northwest of the community of Burns Lake. Its eastern shore is traversed by British Columbia provincial highway 16, where the community of Decker Lake is located. It is fed by Decker Creek, which enters the lake to the southeast of that community.

== Name origin ==
The lake was officially given its name in honour of Stephen Decker, who was a foreman with the Collins Overland Telegraph.

== See also ==
- Decker (disambiguation)
- List of lakes of British Columbia
