= Decker Lake, British Columbia =

Coordinates: 54°18′00″N 125°50′00″W

Decker Lake is a community on the lake of the same name in the Bulkley River drainage of northwestern British Columbia, Canada. It is located northwest of the community of Burns Lake along British Columbia Highway 16, near the outlet of Decker Creek.

== Name origin ==
The lake was officially given its name in honour of Stephen Decker, who was a foreman with the Collins Overland Telegraph.

== See also ==
- Decker (disambiguation)
- List of communities in British Columbia
