= Decker Lake (Le Sueur County, Minnesota) =

Lake in the state of Minnesota, United States

- Location within Minnesota
- Location: Le Sueur County
- Coordinates: 44°20′50″N 93°47′26″W
- Type: Lake
- Surface elevation: 1,020 feet (310 m)

Decker Lake is a lake in Le Sueur County, in the U.S. state of Minnesota.

Decker Lake was named for a local settler.

== See also ==
- List of lakes in Minnesota
