= Tomball High School =

American public high school

Location
- 30330 Quinn Road; Tomball, Harris County, Texas 77375; United States; 30°6′40″N 95°37′43″W

Information
- Type: Public high school
- Motto: The Pride of Texas
- Established: 1908 (Current building: 1974)
- School district: Tomball Independent School District
- Principal: Kimberle McKinney
- Staff: 162.88 (FTE)
- Grades: 9-12
- Enrollment: 3,078 (2023–2024)
- Student to teacher ratio: 18.90
- Colors: Red & White
- Athletics conference: University Interscholastic League
- Mascot: Cougar
- Information: 281-357-3220
- Website: School website

Tomball High School is an accredited public high school in the city of Tomball, Texas. It was the only high school in the Tomball Independent School District before the construction of Tomball Memorial High School in 2011.

== History ==
In 1908, school was first held in Tomball in the Woodmen of the World building, which was a one-room framed building that educated nearly 15 students. The community soon made plans to build a school. Land on Cherry Street was donated, and by 1910 a school was built. The two-story red brick schoolhouse, which was part of the Harris County School System, consisted of two classrooms downstairs and an auditorium upstairs. By 1916, 62 students attended the school. As of 1928, the community grew and consisted of four schools. By 1931, the district employed five teachers.

By 1935, the original schoolhouse was torn down and replaced with a new buff brick building that contained grades one through eleven. Two years later, a petition was presented to the Harris County School Board requesting that Tomball have its own school district. The petition was granted, which transferred all funds and debts to the Tomball Independent School District. The school on Cherry Street had grown so much that by 1938 a second campus was needed. Therefore, the district built a new red brick high school with a gymnasium and a swimming pool, which was located in the 700 block of Main Street.

In 1961, the original high school on Main Street was destroyed after an electrical fire in the school's attic engulfed the building. The Houston Fire Department responded, where the fire fighters dropped a hose into the swimming pool to extinguish the flame. School was dismissed for four days. Churches and other businesses throughout the community offered their facilities so the high school students could complete the school year.

By 1974, students began attending classes at the new Tomball High School on Sandy Lane, later renamed Quinn Road. Continued growth over the decades meant there was a need for additional classrooms. In 2000, voters approved a $98.4 million bond referendum that enabled the district to renovate Tomball High School.

In 2011 principal Gary Moss was scheduled to retire in spring 2011, and Greg Quinn, an assistant principal, became principal. He served from Fall 2011 to Spring 2017. Chris Scott is the current principal.

The high school was remodeled in 2005 and a cougar statue in front of the school was donated by an artist from Magnolia. In 2021, the school raised funds for a new cougar statue.

== Academics ==
For the 2018-2019 school year, Tomball High School received a B grade from the Texas Education Agency, with an overall score of 88 out of 100. This is notably 5 points lower than their fellow Tomball ISD high school, Tomball Memorial High School, which received a 93 out of 100. Within the three performance domains, Tomball High School received an A grade for Student Achievement (score of 92), a B grade for School Progress (score of 81), and a C grade for Closing the Gaps (score of 79). For context, Tomball Memorial High School received an A grade for Student Achievement (score of 95, 3 points higher), an A grade for Student Progress (score of 92, 11 points higher), and a B grade for Closing the Gaps (score of 89, 10 points higher). Tomball High School received one distinction designation for Academic Achievement (in Social Studies), while failing to receive the Academic Achievement in Science, Mathematics, English Language Arts/Reading, and Postsecondary Readiness, while also failing to place in the top 25% in Comparative Academic Growth and Comparative Closing the Gaps. For context, Tomball Memorial High School received Academic Achievement marks in Social Studies, Mathematics, and English Language Arts/Reading, while successfully placing in the top 25% in Comparative Academic Growth and Comparative Closing the Gaps.

For the 2019-2020 school year, U.S. News gave Tomball High School a score of an 81.41 out of 100. The school is ranked 275th among Texas high schools, and 3,307th nationally. According to U.S. News, 43% of the school's students took at least one AP (Advanced Placement) exam in 2020, and 68% of those students passed at least one. Inversely, 32% of Tomball High School students who took at least one AP exam did not pass any of their AP exams. These marks are lower than their district's average, yet higher than their state's average.

== Athletics ==
Tomball High School is a member of Region II, District 15-6A of the University Interscholastic League.

In 2013, the Tomball High School baseball team finished the season with a 36-4 record and won the Texas UIL 4A State Championship.

In 2024, the Tomball High School baseball team finished the season with a 41-3 record and won the Texas UIL 6A State Championship. Tomball's sophomore starting pitchers, C.J. Sampson (14-0) and Karson Reeder (14-1), were named MVPs of the semifinal game and championship game, respectively. Tomball's senior catcher, Cade Arrimbade, was named Texas Gatorade Player of the Year.

Sport	Boys	Girls	Highlights
Baseball	X	-	4A State Champs: 2013 6A State Champs: 2024 6A Div. 2 State Champs: 2026 6A Div. 2 State Runner Up: 2025 5A Region 3 Champs (State Semi-Finalist): 2015
Basketball	X	X	4A Girls State-Semifinalist: 1994
Cross-Country	X	X	4A Girls State Champ: Liz Shell (1991, 1992)
Football	X	-	Playoff Appearances: 1946-50, 57, 67, 71, 83-90, 94, 2003, 10, 12, 18, 21-25 B Regional Champs: 1946, 1948, 1949, 1950 2A Region 3 Finalist: 1971 4A State Finalist: 1984, 1985 4A Region 3 Finalist: 1988 5A Div 2 Reg 2 Area Champs: 2010 6A Div 2 Region 2 Champs (State Semi-Finalist): 2021 6A Div 2 Reg 2 Area Champs: 2022, 2023 6A Div 2 Bi-District (15/16) Champs: 2024
Golf	X	X	B Boys State Champ: Bob White (1954), Mike Higgins (1958)
Soccer	X	X	
Softball	-	X	5A State Finalist: 1993, 2004 5A State Semi-Finalist: 1995, 2005, 2010
Swimming & Diving	X	X	4A Boys State Champ: Trevor Strong, 100 Breastroke (2014)
Tennis	X	X	5A Boys Doubles State Champ: Bridges/Walley (2004)
Track & Field	X	X	6A Girls State Champ: Naomi “Peach” Booker, 100m Hurdles and 300m Hurdles (2025), 100m Hurdles (2026)
Volleyball	-	X	

== Demographics ==
In the 2018-2019 school year, there were 2,054 students. 4.5% were African American, 2.1% were Asian, 33.0% were Hispanic, 0.3% were American Indian, 57.1% were White, and 3.0% were two or more races. 27.4% of students were Economically Disadvantaged, 3.9% were English Language Learners, and 8.8% received Special Education services.

== Notable alumni ==
- Christopher S. Adams Jr., author and retired United States Air Force General
- Chad Brannon, TV actor best known for his role in General Hospital
- Josh Breaux, baseball player in the New York Yankees organization
- Drake Britton, baseball player for the Boston Red Sox
- Jimmy Butler, basketball player for the Chicago Bulls, Minnesota Timberwolves, Philadelphia 76ers, Miami Heat, and Golden State Warriors.
- Robert Dugger, MLB pitcher
- Mike Eli, lead singer of the Eli Young Band
- Karlie Hay, Miss Teen USA 2016
- Chris Herrmann, baseball player for the Arizona Diamondbacks, Minnesota Twins
- Jordan Leslie, football player for Cleveland Browns
- Jimmy Needham, contemporary Christian musician.
- Troy Patton, baseball player for the Baltimore Orioles
- David Phelps, Christian vocalist
- Gary Porter, professional football player and coach
- Kyle Russell, baseball player
- Drew Svoboda, college football coach
- Jake Bates, football placekicker for Detroit Lions
