= Tomball, Texas =

- City
- Seal
- Motto: "Tomball. Texan for Fun!"
- Location in Harris County and the state of Texas
- Coordinates: 30°5′50″N 95°36′58″W
- Country: United States
- State: Texas
- Counties: Harris
- City Established: December 2, 1907

Government
  - Type: Council-Manager
  - Mayor: Lori Klein Quinn
  - City Manager: David Esquivel

Area
  - Total: 13.09 sq mi (33.91 km^{2})
  - Land: 13.01 sq mi (33.69 km^{2})
  - Water: 0.085 sq mi (0.22 km^{2})
- Elevation: 187 ft (57 m)

Population (2020)
  - Total: 12,341
  - Estimate (2025): 15,768
  - Density: 905.5/sq mi (349.62/km^{2})
- Time zone: UTC−6 (Central (CST))
  - Summer (DST): UTC−5 (CDT)
- ZIP codes: 77375, 77377
- Area codes: 281, 346, 621, 713, 832
- FIPS code: 48-73316
- 1GNIS feature ID: 1348633
- Website: tomballtx.gov

Tomball (/ˈtɒmbɔːl/ TOM-bawl, locally [ˈtʰɑmbɒʊ̯]) is a city in Harris County in the U.S. state of Texas, a part of the Houston metropolitan area. The population was 12,341 at the 2020 U.S. census. In 1907, the community of Peck was renamed Tomball for local congressman Thomas Henry Ball, who had a major role in the development of the Port of Houston.

== History ==
Tomball Train Depot

European settlement began in the Tomball area in the early 19th century, where newcomers found an open, fertile land that received adequate rainfall—perfect conditions for farming and raising cattle. It was on a land granted in 1838 to William Hurd's heirs. In 1906 the area began to boom. Railroad line engineers often noticed that the Tomball area was on the boundary between the low hills of Texas and the flat coastal plains of the Gulf, making it an ideal location for a train stop. The railroad could load more cargo on each car, because the topography gently sloped toward the Galveston ports and provided an easier downhill coast. Thomas Henry Ball, an attorney for the Trinity and Brazos Valley Railroad, convinced the railroad to run the line right through downtown Tomball. Soon after, people came in droves to this new train stop. Hotels, boarding houses, saloons, and mercantile stores all began to spring up in the area. At first, people called the area Peck, after a chief civil engineer of the railroad line. However, on December 2, 1907, the town was officially named Tom Ball, later to be shortened to one word, for Mr. Ball.

Tomball was the subject of considerable scandal during the 1914 Texas gubernatorial primary election; Thomas Ball, the town's namesake, ran as a Prohibitionist Democrat, but was defeated by the Constructionist Democrat James Ferguson. Some of Ferguson's supporters visited Tomball and found it to be a town littered with alcoholics; they brought back photos of Tomballians staggering out of at least four saloons. The Ferguson campaign publicized these pictures to show the supposed contradiction between the town's prohibitionist namesake and its decidedly non-prohibitionist behavior; Ball resigned from the race as a result and later stated, "If they had not named that town after me, I would have been the next governor of Texas."

Geophysical prospecting predicted the discovery of the Tomball Oil Field before the discovery well was drilled on 27 May 1933. Production was from the Cockfield Formation at a depth of about 5,000 feet (1,500 m). The discovery produced an oil boom with many oil companies subsequently showing interest in the area. By 1935, 2,750,000 barrels of oil had been produced from 200 wells. Humble Oil Company, struck a deal with the town through which they would provide water and natural gas free of charge to the residents in exchange for rights to drill on the land. This agreement lasted until 1988.

Tomball incorporated in 1933. Because of the 1933 incorporation, Houston did not incorporate Tomball's territory into its city limits.

== Geography ==
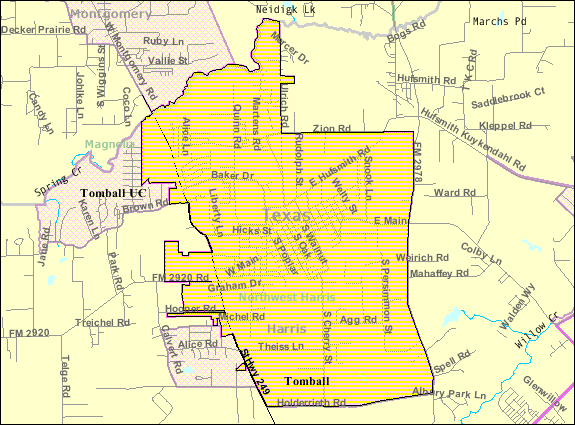
Map of Tomball

Tomball is located at 30°5′50″N 95°36′58″W.

According to the United States Census Bureau, the city has a total area of 11.9 square miles (30.9 km^{2}), of which 11.8 square miles (30.5 km^{2}) is land and 0.19 square miles (0.5 km^{2}), or 1.54%, is water.

=== Climate ===
The climate in this area is characterized by hot, humid summers and generally mild to cool winters. According to the Köppen Climate Classification system, Tomball has a humid subtropical climate, abbreviated "Cfa" on climate maps.

Climate data for David Wayne Hooks Memorial Airport near Tomball, 1981–2010 normals, (Note: Mean monthly maxima and minima (i.e. the highest and lowest temperature readings during an entire month or year) calculated based on data at said location from 1981 to 2010.) extremes 1888–present (Note: Official records for the entire Houston area were kept at the Weather Bureau in downtown Houston from July 1888 to May 1969, and at George Bush Intercontinental Airport since June 1969.)
Month	Jan	Feb	Mar	Apr	May	Jun	Jul	Aug	Sep	Oct	Nov	Dec	Year
Record high °F (°C)	84 (29)	91 (33)	96 (36)	95 (35)	99 (37)	107 (42)	105 (41)	109 (43)	109 (43)	99 (37)	89 (32)	85 (29)	109 (43)
Mean daily maximum °F (°C)	61.5 (16.4)	65.6 (18.7)	72.1 (22.3)	78.7 (25.9)	85.7 (29.8)	90.4 (32.4)	93.1 (33.9)	93.8 (34.3)	89.2 (31.8)	82.6 (28.1)	71.7 (22.1)	64.5 (18.1)	79.1 (26.2)
Daily mean °F (°C)	51.5 (10.8)	55.1 (12.8)	60.8 (16.0)	67.9 (19.9)	75.8 (24.3)	80.8 (27.1)	82.1 (27.8)	82.6 (28.1)	78.0 (25.6)	70.1 (21.2)	60.0 (15.6)	52.9 (11.6)	68.2 (20.1)
Mean daily minimum °F (°C)	41.4 (5.2)	44.7 (7.1)	49.5 (9.7)	57.1 (13.9)	65.9 (18.8)	71.2 (21.8)	71.2 (21.8)	71.4 (21.9)	66.7 (19.3)	57.5 (14.2)	48.3 (9.1)	41.2 (5.1)	57.2 (14.0)
Record low °F (°C)	5 (−15)	6 (−14)	21 (−6)	31 (−1)	42 (6)	52 (11)	62 (17)	54 (12)	45 (7)	29 (−2)	19 (−7)	7 (−14)	5 (−15)
Average precipitation inches (mm)	3.55 (90)	3.03 (77)	3.59 (91)	3.39 (86)	4.77 (121)	5.22 (133)	3.84 (98)	4.70 (119)	4.57 (116)	5.30 (135)	4.72 (120)	3.80 (97)	50.48 (1,282)
Average precipitation days (≥ 0.01 in)	9	8	9	7	8	10	10	8	8	8	8	10	101
Source: NOAA (precipitation days 2000–2017 at Bush International)

== Demographics ==
Historical population
Census	Pop.	Note	%±
1940	668		—
1950	1,065		59.4%
1960	1,713		60.8%
1970	2,734		59.6%
1980	3,996		46.2%
1990	6,370		59.4%
2000	9,089		42.7%
2010	10,753		18.3%
2020	12,341		14.8%
2025 (est.)	15,768		27.8%
U.S. Decennial Census

Tomball city limit sign located at the Harris County line on SH 249, showing the city's population in 2000

=== Racial and ethnic composition ===
Tomball city, Texas – Racial and ethnic composition Note: the US Census treats Hispanic/Latino as an ethnic category. This table excludes Latinos from the racial categories and assigns them to a separate category. Hispanics/Latinos may be of any race.
Race / Ethnicity (NH = Non-Hispanic)	Pop 2000	Pop 2010	Pop 2020	% 2000	% 2010	% 2020
White alone (NH)	7,357	7,908	8,328	80.94%	73.54%	67.48%
Black or African American alone (NH)	435	661	833	4.79%	6.15%	6.75%
Native American or Alaska Native alone (NH)	30	52	27	0.33%	0.48%	0.22%
Asian alone (NH)	58	118	177	0.64%	1.10%	1.43%
Native Hawaiian or Pacific Islander alone (NH)	4	7	12	0.04%	0.07%	0.10%
Other race alone (NH)	17	20	50	0.19%	0.19%	0.41%
Mixed race or Multiracial (NH)	93	157	430	1.02%	1.46%	3.48%
Hispanic or Latino (any race)	1,095	1,830	2,484	12.05%	17.02%	20.13%
Total	9,089	10,753	12,341	100.00%	100.00%	100.00%

=== 2020 census ===
As of the 2020 census, Tomball had a population of 12,341. The median age was 40.7 years. 21.7% of residents were under the age of 18 and 21.5% of residents were 65 years of age or older. For every 100 females there were 84.3 males, and for every 100 females age 18 and over there were 80.4 males age 18 and over.

There were 5,057 households in Tomball, of which 30.9% had children under the age of 18 living in them. Of all households, 40.3% were married-couple households, 18.3% were households with a male householder and no spouse or partner present, and 35.3% were households with a female householder and no spouse or partner present. About 34.0% of all households were made up of individuals and 18.9% had someone living alone who was 65 years of age or older.

There were 5,448 housing units, of which 7.2% were vacant. The homeowner vacancy rate was 2.1% and the rental vacancy rate was 7.5%.

96.7% of residents lived in urban areas, while 3.3% lived in rural areas.

Racial composition as of the 2020 census
Race	Number	Percent
White	8,918	72.3%
Black or African American	855	6.9%
American Indian and Alaska Native	69	0.6%
Asian	181	1.5%
Native Hawaiian and Other Pacific Islander	19	0.2%
Some other race	824	6.7%
Two or more races	1,475	12.0%
Hispanic or Latino (of any race)	2,484	20.1%

=== 2000 census ===
At the census of 2000, there were 9,089 people living in the city. The population density was 895.4 inhabitants per square mile (345.7/km^{2}). There were 10,009 housing units at an average density of 395.0 per square mile (152.5/km^{2}). The racial makeup of the city was 86.73% White, 4.91% African American, 0.40% Native American, 0.64% Asian, 0.06% Pacific Islander, 5.57% from other races, and 1.71% from two or more races. Hispanic or Latino of any race were 12.05% of the population.

There were 14,687 households, out of which 33.8% had children under the age of 18 living with them, 44.6% were married couples living together, 13.7% had a female householder with no husband present, and 36.9% were non-families. 30.5% of all households were made up of individuals, and 12.6% had someone living alone who was 65 years of age or older. The average household size was 2.43 and the average family size was 3.03.

In the city, the population was spread out, with 25.3% under the age of 18, 10.6% from 18 to 24, 29.8% from 25 to 44, 18.6% from 45 to 64, and 15.7% who were 65 years of age or older. The median age was 35 years. For every 100 females, there were 87.1 males. For every 100 females age 18 and over, there were 83.0 males.

The median income for a household in the city was $37,787, and the median income for a family was $45,764. Males had a median income of $38,059 versus $26,799 for females. The per capita income for the city was $20,331. About 4.5% of families and 7.3% of the population were below the poverty line, including 6.3% of those under age 18 and 17.6% of those age 65 or over.

== Education ==
=== Primary and secondary schools ===
==== Public schools ====
Pupils who live in Tomball attend schools in the Tomball Independent School District.

The district contains eleven elementary schools (Tomball, Decker Prairie, Lakewood, Timber Creek, Creekside Forest, Creekview, Canyon Pointe, Willow Creek, Wildwood, Grand Oakes and Rosehill Elementary Schools). The schools also include a bilingual program. There are also three intermediate schools (Northpointe, Tomball Intermediate, and Oakcrest Intermediate; Beckendorf closed in 2009), four junior high schools (Creekside Park, Tomball, Willow Wood and Grand Lakes Junior High Schools), and three high schools (Tomball High School, Tomball Memorial High School, and Tomball Star Academy) within Tomball ISD. They also have the Connections Academy which includes the 18+ program.

In 2019, the Texas Education Agency released the 2018–2019 accountability ratings for school districts across the state and Tomball ISD earned an overall "A" rating. TISD earned 92 of 100 possible points overall.

==== Private schools ====
Concordia Lutheran High School (9–12) is a private school in Tomball.

St. Anne Catholic School is a Pre-K–8 Catholic school of the Roman Catholic Archdiocese of Galveston-Houston. Established in 1984, it originally held its classes at St. Anne Church; that year it had 16 Kindergarten students and 13 first grade students. It had had 380 students in 2015. That year Joseph Noonan became the principal.

Other private schools in the greater Tomball area include Step by Step Christian School established in 1982, Rosehill Christian School (K–12), Salem Lutheran School, Cypress Christian School (K–12), and Great Oak School a Waldorf School (Pre-K–8). Cypress Christian, established in 1978, originally held its classes at Cypress Bible Church. It now has over 650 students. In 2018, Dr. Jeffery Potts joined CCS as Head of School. Dr. Potts was on the news for creating a School Marshall Program, where he armed teachers with guns at his previous school.

=== Colleges and universities ===
Lone Star College (originally the North Harris Montgomery Community College District) serves the community. The territory in Tomball ISD joined the community college district in 1982. Tomball is served by Lone Star College–Tomball, a member of the Lone Star College System.

=== Public libraries ===
A branch of the Harris County Public Library, located in Tomball College, is a joint project between the college and HCPL.

== Government and infrastructure ==
Harris County operates a tax office at 101 South Walnut Street in Tomball.

The North Harris County Regional Water Authority form by State legislation as a taxing entity, which is located in Voting District No. 2. The Texas House of Representatives bill that created the water authority, HB 2965, was signed into law on June 18, 1999. On January 15, 2000 voters voted to confirm the creation of the authority in a special election. It taxes the cities water customers, however it does not provide water services to Tomball, as Tomball has its own water supply.

Over 1,000 autogyros in the world are used by authorities for military and law enforcement, but the first US police authorities to evaluate an autogyro are the Tomball police, on a $40,000 grant from the U.S. Department of Justice, together with city funds, costing much less than a helicopter to buy ($75,000) and operate ($50/hour). Although it is able to land in 40-knot (74 km/h; 46 mph) crosswinds, a minor accident happened due to a wind gust.

Harris County Housing Authority (HCHA) operates The Retreat at Westlock, a public housing complex for seniors, in an unincorporated area away from the Tomball city limits, along Texas State Highway 249. and near Farm to Market Road 1960. It has 166,762 square feet (15,492.7 m^{2}) of space, and has 140 units. Residents may be aged 65 or older. The complex began taking occupants in May 2017, and completion was scheduled by fall 2017. Prior to the development of the complex, residents of area subdivisions expressed opposition to the addition of low income housing in their areas. The HCHA set a ban on visitors under age 62 from being present at The Retreat at Westlock for periods longer than three days each, due to the opposition from the surrounding areas; it is, as of 2017, the only HCHA property with this rule.

The Harris Health System (formerly Harris County Hospital District) designated the Acres Homes Health Center for the ZIP code 77375. The designated public hospital is Lyndon B. Johnson Hospital in northeast Houston.

=== City government ===
Position	Official	Notes
Mayor	Lori Klein Quinn	Elected May 2022, Serving 1st Term
Mayor	Gretchen Fagan	Elected May 2007 – 2022 (Councilwoman from 2004–2007)
Councilman, Position 1	Shelley Michna	Elected May 2026, Serving 1st Term
Councilman, Position 2	Paul Garcia	
Councilman, Position 3	Dane Dunagin	Elected 2023
Councilman, Position 4	Lisa Covington	
Councilman, Position 5	Randy Parr	
City Manager	David Esquivel, PE	since 2021
Assistant City Manager	Sakura Moten	2025
City Attorney	Loren Smith	
City Secretary	Thomas Harris III	
Fire Chief	Joe Sykora	
Police Chief	Jeffrey Bert	June 29, 2020
Director of Public Works	Drew Huffman	
Director of Community Development	vacant	

On September 7, 2010, the Tomball City Council voted down a proposal to make English the official language of the city, and it voted down a measure that would have forbidden undocumented immigrants from owning and/or renting property and operating and/or owning businesses.

=== Postal service ===
Tomball Post Office

The United States Postal Service operates the Tomball Post Office at 122 North Holderrieth Boulevard, 77375-9998.

== Healthcare ==
The city is served by Tomball Regional Medical Center, located at 605 Holderrieth Boulevard. It is a full-service 357-bed facility hospital providing special expertise in cardiovascular disease, cancer care, emergency services, digital diagnostic imaging, physical rehabilitation, sports medicine, and comprehensive wound and lymphedema care. Tomball Regional Medical Care is owned by HCA Healthcare Incorporated.

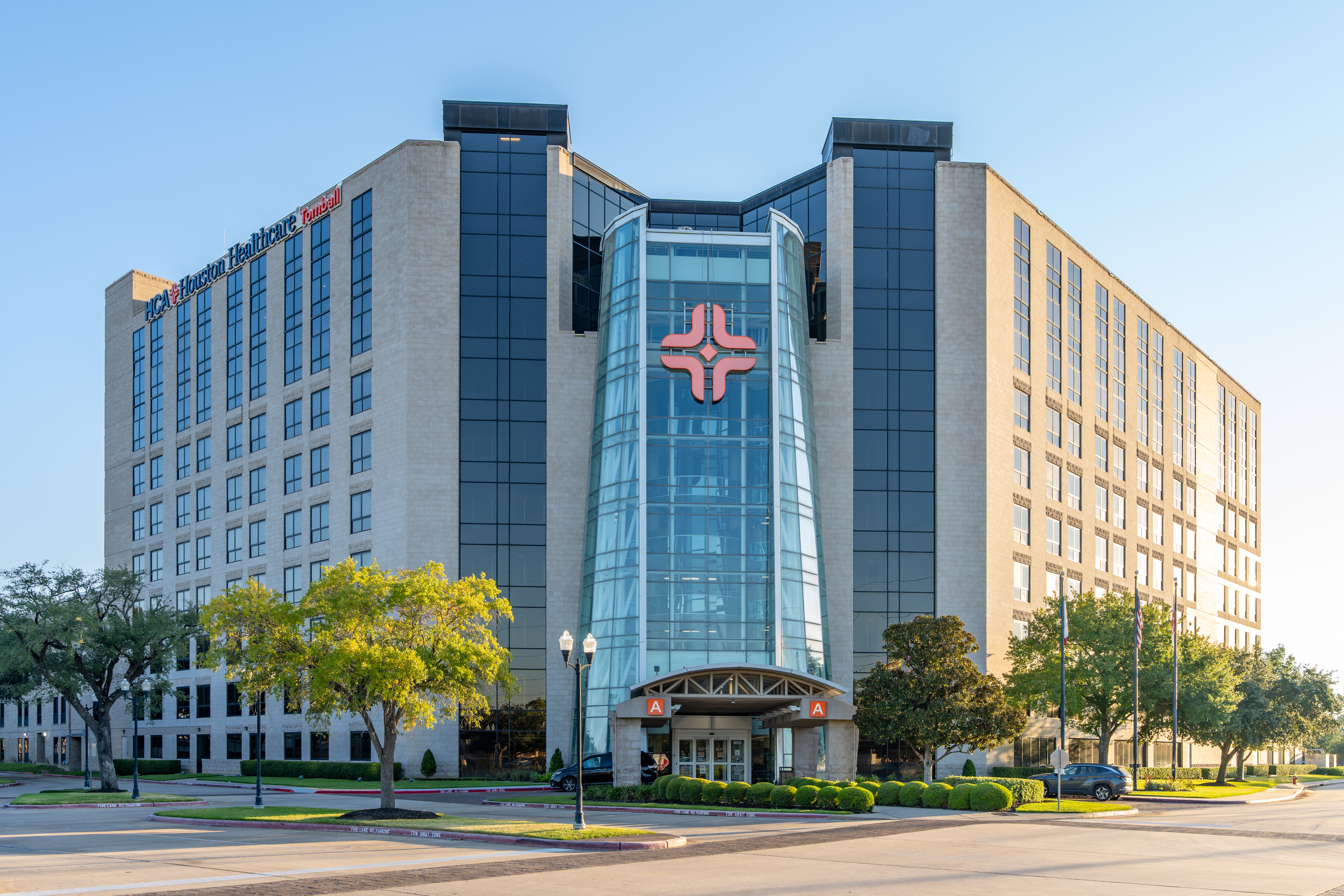
HCA Houston Healthcare – Tomball

== Transportation ==
The city of Tomball is primarily served by FM 2920 (Main Street) east to west and State Highway 249 (Tomball Parkway) north to south.

David Wayne Hooks Memorial Airport, a general aviation airport, is located outside of the Tomball city limits in northwest Harris County. On June 27, 2007, the Texas State Legislature approved Tomball's request to annex Hooks Airport even though the airport does not border the Tomball city limits. Since the airport is in the city of Houston's extraterritorial jurisdiction, the city of Tomball had to get permission from Houston to annex the airport.

== Economy ==
Tomball benefits from a robust retail corridor along SH-249 as well as a growing commercial complex just south of the recently constructed Highway 99 (the "Grand Parkway"). The city's budget is heavily reliant on the sales tax revenue, which contributes 45% of the General Fund. Property taxes account for 17% of the fund. Public safety (police, fire, emergency services district #15, and dispatch together) accounts for 43% of General Fund expenditures. Local events, such as the German Heritage Festival and German Christmas Market (both known colloquially as "Germanfest") every March and December, contribute to seasonal swings in tax revenue.

== Notable people ==
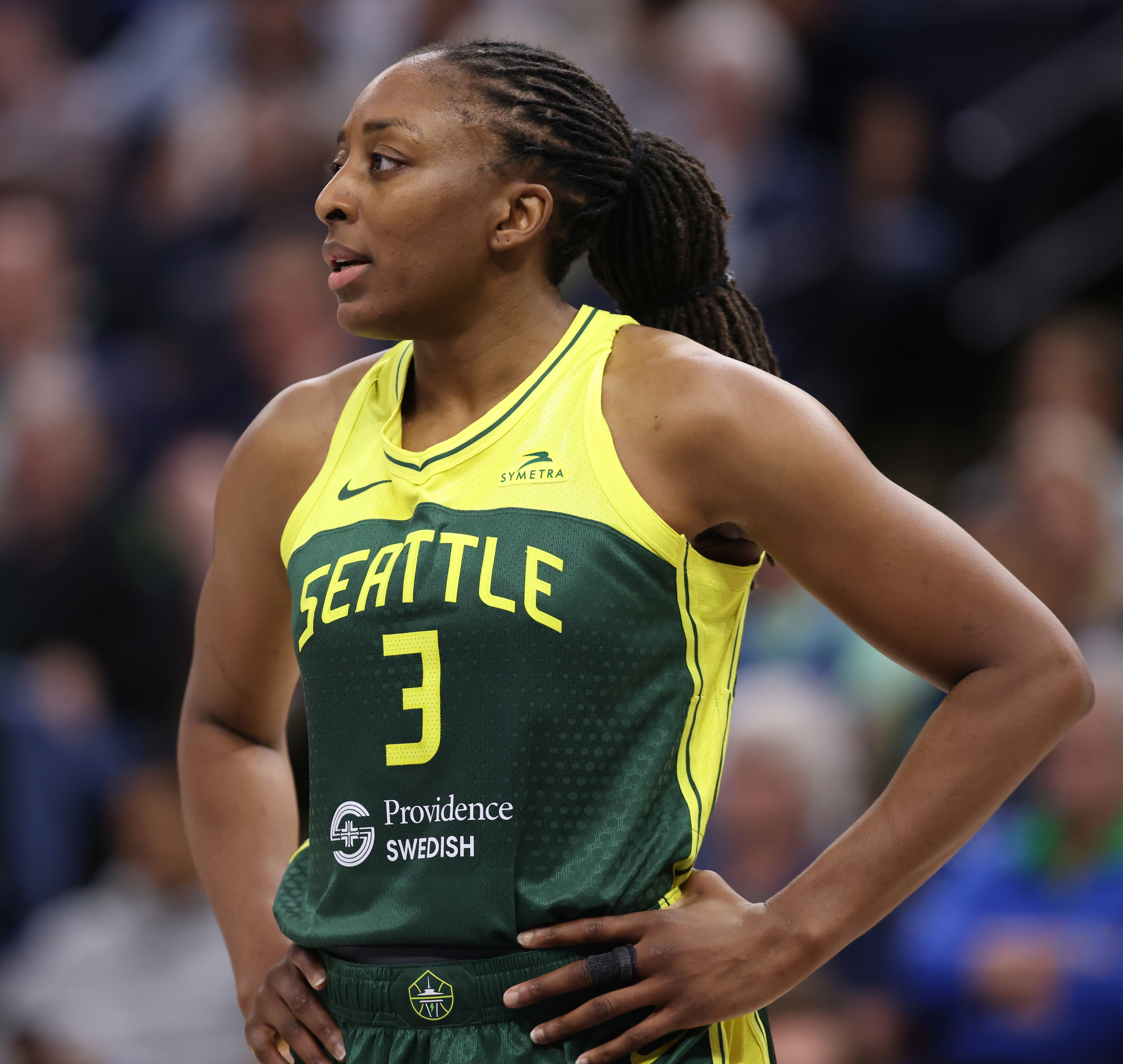
- Nneka Ogwumike
  Jenny Adams, track and field athlete
- Jake Bates, NFL kicker for the Detroit Lions
- Jimmy Butler, NBA basketball player for the Golden State Warriors
- Ray Collins, NFL defensive tackle
- Brooke Daniels, Miss Texas USA 2009
- Mike Eli, singer/songwriter of Eli Young Band
- Clint Fagan, MLB umpire
- Karlie Hay, Miss Teen USA 2016
- Charlie Hayes, former MLB infielder
- Ke'Bryan Hayes, MLB infielder for the Cincinnati Reds
- Keith Heinrich, former NFL player
- Chris Herrmann, MLB catcher
- Asher Hong, gymnast
- Justin Jackson, NBA basketball player
- Ben Keating, racing driver and business owner
- Tracy Malechek-Ezekiel
- Venric Mark, former college football player
- Jimmy Needham, contemporary Christian musician
- Chiney Ogwumike, WNBA player for the Los Angeles Sparks
- Nneka Ogwumike, WNBA player for the Seattle Storm and President of the WNBPA
- Troy Patton, MLB pitcher
- David Phelps, Southern Gospel tenor
- Gary Porter, former quarterback and coach
- Debbie Riddle, former member of the Texas House of Representatives
- Dave Smith, former MLB pitcher
- Valoree Swanson, member of the Texas House of Representatives
- Nick Tremark, former MLB outfielder
- Roger Vick, former NFL player
- Sherron Watkins, former executive at Enron

== Sister city ==
Tomball's sister city is Telgte, Germany. The two cities participate in foreign exchange student programs. The high school also receives exchange students from other areas, such as Armenia.

Tomball also has a sister city in Yaozhuang, China since 2006.

== See also ==
- American National Carbide
- Main Street Crossing
