= Dicker (disambiguation) =

To dicker is to bargain.

Dicker may also refer to:

== Surname ==
- Dicker (surname), an English surname

== Places ==
- Upper Dicker, a village located in the parish of Arlington, East Sussex, United Kingdom
- Lower Dicker, a village within the civil parish of Hellingly, East Sussex, United Kingdom
- Lower Dicker, a geological site of special scientific interest, located approximately four kilometres north-west of Hailsham, East Sussex, United Kingdom
- Dickering Wapentake, an administrative division of the historic East Riding of Yorkshire in England

== Other uses ==
- Dicker Max, a German self-propelled anti-tank gun
- Dicker-rod, a measuring device in gridiron football

== See also ==
- Decker (surname), a German surname
- Dickerson (surname)
- Dickert, a German surname
- Dikkers, an English surname
