= Dicker (surname) =

Dicker is an English occupational surname for a digger of ditches or a builder of dikes, or a topographic name for someone who lived near a ditch. Notable people with the surname include:

- Alfred Dicker (1852–1938), English clergyman and rower
- Cameron Dicker (born 2000), American football player
- Cintia Dicker (born 1986), Brazilian model and actress
- Daniel Dicker (born 1995), Austrian handball player
- David Dicker (1882–1967), Australian politician
- Edward T. Dicker (1913–1981), American politician
- Fredric U. Dicker, American journalist
- Friedl Dicker-Brandeis (1898–1944), Austrian artist and educator murdered by the Nazis in the Auschwitz-Birkenau extermination camp
- Gary Dicker (born 1986), Irish footballer
- Georges Dicker (born 1942), American philosopher
- Jacques Dicker (1879–1942), Swiss politician
- Jarrod Dicker (born 1985), American writer and entrepreneur
- Jean-Jacques Dicker (born 1944), Swiss-French-American photographer
- Joël Dicker (born 1985), Swiss novelist
- John Dicker (1815–1895), English cricketer
- Les Dicker (1926–2020), English footballer
- Madeline Dicker (born 1899), Irish spy during War of Independence
- Ruth Dicker (1919–2004), American painter
- Ryan Dicker (born 1986), English footballer
- Samuel Dicker (died 1760), British politician
- Samuel B. Dicker (1889–1960), American politician

== See also ==
- Dicker (disambiguation)
- Dikkers, a variant spelling
- Loek Dikker (born 1944), Dutch pianist, conductor, and composer
