= Decker (surname) =

Decker is a surname of German origin. Notable people with the surname include:

== People ==
=== Arts and entertainment ===
- Brooklyn Decker, an American model
- Carol Decker, English recording artist
- Cora Decker Sargent (1868-1944), American composer
- Daniel Decker, Puerto Rican composer
- Frank Duveneck, American figure and portrait painter.
- Frans Decker (1684 – 1751), Dutch painter
- Franz-Paul Decker (1923–2014), German conductor
- Georg Decker (1818–1894), an Austrian portrait artist
- Hans Decker, German sculptor of the fifteenth century
- Jennifer Decker, a French actress
- Johann Stephan Decker (1784–1844), French painter
- John Decker (artist) (1895–1947), German painter, set designer and caricaturist in Hollywood
- Lindsey Decker (1923–1994), American artist
- Mary Beth Decker (b. 1981), American model
- Richard Decker, cartoonist in The New Yorker
- Jorel Decker, musical artist in the band Hollywood Undead

=== Government and politics ===
- Bob Decker (1922-1999), American politician and educator
- Edward Decker (1827–1911), American businessman and politician in Kewaunee County, Wisconsin
- Eileen M. Decker, American lawyer
- George Decker (1902–1980), American Chief of Staff of the United States Army
- Grant Decker (1814–1890), American politician from Michigan
- Bill Decker (sheriff) (1898–1970), Sheriff of Dallas, Texas during the assassination of John F. Kennedy
- John Decker (fire chief) (1823–1892), American businessman, politician and firefighter
- John A. Decker (1915–2006), American judge from Wisconsin
- Michael P. Decker (born 1944), American politician from North Carolina
- Russ Decker (born 1953), American politician from Wisconsin
- Wilhelm Decker (1899–1945), Nazi politician

=== Sports ===
==== Baseball ====
- Bill Decker, American college baseball coach
- Cody Decker (born 1987), American baseball player
- Jaff Decker (born 1990), American baseball player
- Nick Decker (born 1999), American baseball player
- Steve Decker (born 1965), American baseball player

==== Motorsport ====
- Claire Decker (born 1995), American stock car racing driver
- Natalie Decker (born 1997), American stock car racing driver
- Paige Decker (born 1993), American stock car racing driver

==== Other sports ====
- Brianna Decker (born 1991), American ice hockey player
- Eric Decker (born 1987), American football player
- Karl Decker (footballer) (1921–2005), Austrian footballer
- Mary Decker (born 1958), American middle-distance runner

=== Other ===
- Almarian Decker, American electrical engineer
- Ed Decker, American evangelist
- John Decker (fire chief) (1823–1892), American businessman, politician and firefighter
- Karl Decker (1897–1945), German general
- Matthew Decker, Dutch-born English merchant and writer
- Scott Decker, American criminologist
- Susan Decker, American corporate executive

== Fictional characters ==
- Charlie Decker, the protagonist of the 1977 novel Rage by Stephen King
- Chloe Decker, character in Lucifer
- Matt Decker, character in Star Trek
- Dr. Philip Decker, character in Clive Barker's short novel Cabal and film adaptation Nightbreed
- Colonel Roderick Decker, archenemy of The A-Team
- Theodore Decker, the protagonist of the 2013 novel The Goldfinch by Donna Tartt
- Willard Decker, character in Star Trek

== See also ==
- Deckers (surname)
- Dekker (surname)
- Dikkers
