= Backfield in Motion =

Backfield in Motion may refer to:

- Backfield in motion, a term used in American football as per List of gridiron football rules
- "Backfield in Motion" (The Angelos song), a 1964 song by The Angelos
- (Git Your) Backfield in Motion, a 1966 song by The Poindexter Brothers
- "Backfield in Motion" (song), a 1969 song by Mel & Tim
- Backfield in Motion (film), a 1991 American comedy film directed by Richard Michaels
