= William Lofland Dudley =

American chemistry professor

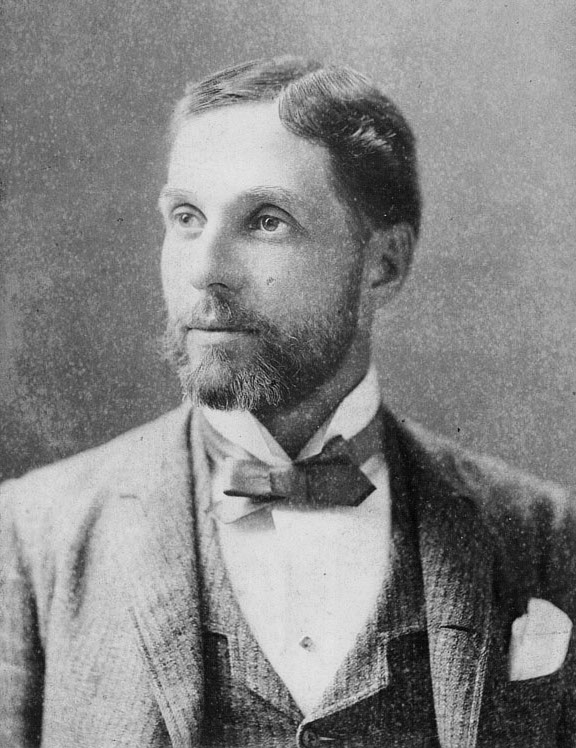
- Dudley, c. 1895
- Born: April 16, 1859; Covington, Kentucky, U.S.
- Died: September 8, 1914 (aged 55); Nashville, Tennessee, U.S.
- Education: University of Cincinnati (B. S., 1880); Miami Medical College (M. D., 1885)
- Known for: Cincinnati, Demonstrator of Chemistry (1880–1881); Cincinnati Industrial Exposition, Commissioner (1881–1885); Professor of Chemistry and Toxicology (1880–1886); Vanderbilt, Chair of Chemistry (1886); Dean of Vanderbilt Medical Department (1895–1914); SIAA President (1894–1912); NCAA Executive Committee; Football Rules Committee Executive Committee. (1907–1914); Dudley Field's namesake Tennessee Centennial Exposition, Director of Affairs (1897); University Club of Nashville President
- Scientific career
- Fields: Chemistry
- Workplaces: Miami Medical College; Vanderbilt University

William Lofland Dudley (April 16, 1859 – September 8, 1914) was an American chemistry professor at both the University of Cincinnati and Vanderbilt University and an athletics pioneer during the Progressive Era. At Vanderbilt, he was appointed dean of its medical department. He was also once vice-president of the American Association for the Advancement of Science, and was notably director of affairs on the Tennessee Centennial Exposition executive committee.

Early in Dudley's career, he and John Holland developed a method for refining iridium that paved the way for commercial applications of the metal. Dudley also discovered that carbon monoxide was a major injurious component of tobacco smoke; and was one of the first to publish the physiological effects of X-rays with fellow Vanderbilt professor John Daniel.

He was instrumental in the establishment of the Southern Intercollegiate Athletic Association (SIAA), the first Southern athletics conference and forerunner of the Southern and Southeastern Conferences. Dudley was a part of the National Collegiate Athletic Association (NCAA) executive and football rules committees. Known as the "father of Vanderbilt football" and the "father of Southern football," he was the namesake of Dudley Field (the first dedicated Southern college football stadium).

== Early years ==
Dudley was born on April 16, 1859, in Covington, Kentucky, to George Reed Dudley and Emma Lofland. His father was a steamboat owner and manufacturer. Dudley's family was of English descent, and he was a lineal descendant of colonial Massachusetts governor Thomas Dudley. He was educated in the Covington public schools, graduating from Covington High School in 1876. Dudley devoted himself largely to scientific study. By 1875 he had already published an article in Scientific American.

=== University of Cincinnati ===
In autumn of 1876, Dudley entered the University of Cincinnati. Dudley received a B. S. degree from the University of Cincinnati in 1880. Dudley was a charter member of the Sigma Chi chapter at the University of Cincinnati (Zeta Psi) and went on to serve as the 8th Grand Consul of Sigma Chi Fraternity serving from 1897 to 1899.

=== Miami Medical College ===
He became a demonstrator of chemistry at Miami Medical College in 1879. He was appointed professor of analytic chemistry at Miami in 1880, and received an honorary M.D. degree in 1885.

== Chemist ==
From 1880 to 1886, Dudley was a professor of chemistry and toxicology at Miami Medical College in Cincinnati, Ohio, and commissioner of the Cincinnati Industrial Exposition from 1881 to 1885. In 1886, he was elected professor and chair of chemistry at Vanderbilt University, where he introduced courses in organic chemistry to the curriculum.

President Grover Cleveland appointed Dudley a member of the Assay Commission of 1887 to examine the weight and fineness of coins. Dudley was appointed Vanderbilt's first dean of the medical department in 1895.

=== Achievements ===
==== Iridium ====
In 1880, one John Holland of Cincinnati discovered the ability to melt and make castings of iridium by fusing the white-hot ore with phosphorus, and patented the process in the United States. He invoked the help of Dudley in getting rid of the phosphorus, who did so by repeated applications of lime at great heat. This was the first reported method of refining iridium. Dudley then found new applications for iridium, and formed the American Iridium Company with Holland. Dudley filed a patent on his method for iridium electroplating in 1887.

==== Tobacco smoke ====
Dudley was credited with discovering that a toxic component of tobacco smoke is carbon monoxide (which poisons the blood by interfering with oxygen's ability to bind to hemoglobin). Dudley rejected the popularly held opinion that cigarette smoke was harmful due to the adulteration of the tobacco, e. g. with opium. His experiments showed the toxic agent to be carbon monoxide, resulting alike from cigarette, pipe, or cigar.

==== X-rays ====
Dudley was one of the first to publish the physiological effects of X-rays along with fellow Vanderbilt professor John Daniel. A child who had been shot in the head was brought to the Vanderbilt laboratory in 1896. Before trying to find the bullet, an experiment was attempted for which Dudley "with his characteristic devotion to science" volunteered. Daniel reported that 21 days after taking a picture of Dudley's skull (with an exposure time of one hour), he noticed a bald spot 2 inches (5.1 cm) in diameter on the part of his head nearest the X-ray tube. His discovery prompted physicians to experiment with x-radiation as a method for hair removal - a method that became popular in the early 20th century, and was soon adopted by commercial practitioners (i.e. salon owners) as well.

==== Aurora borealis ====
In 1909, Dudley hypothesized that the excitation of neon, at the time a recently discovered noble gas, was responsible for the appearance of the aurora borealis. While this was incorrect, his suggestion was widely reported by the media at the time.

=== Societies ===
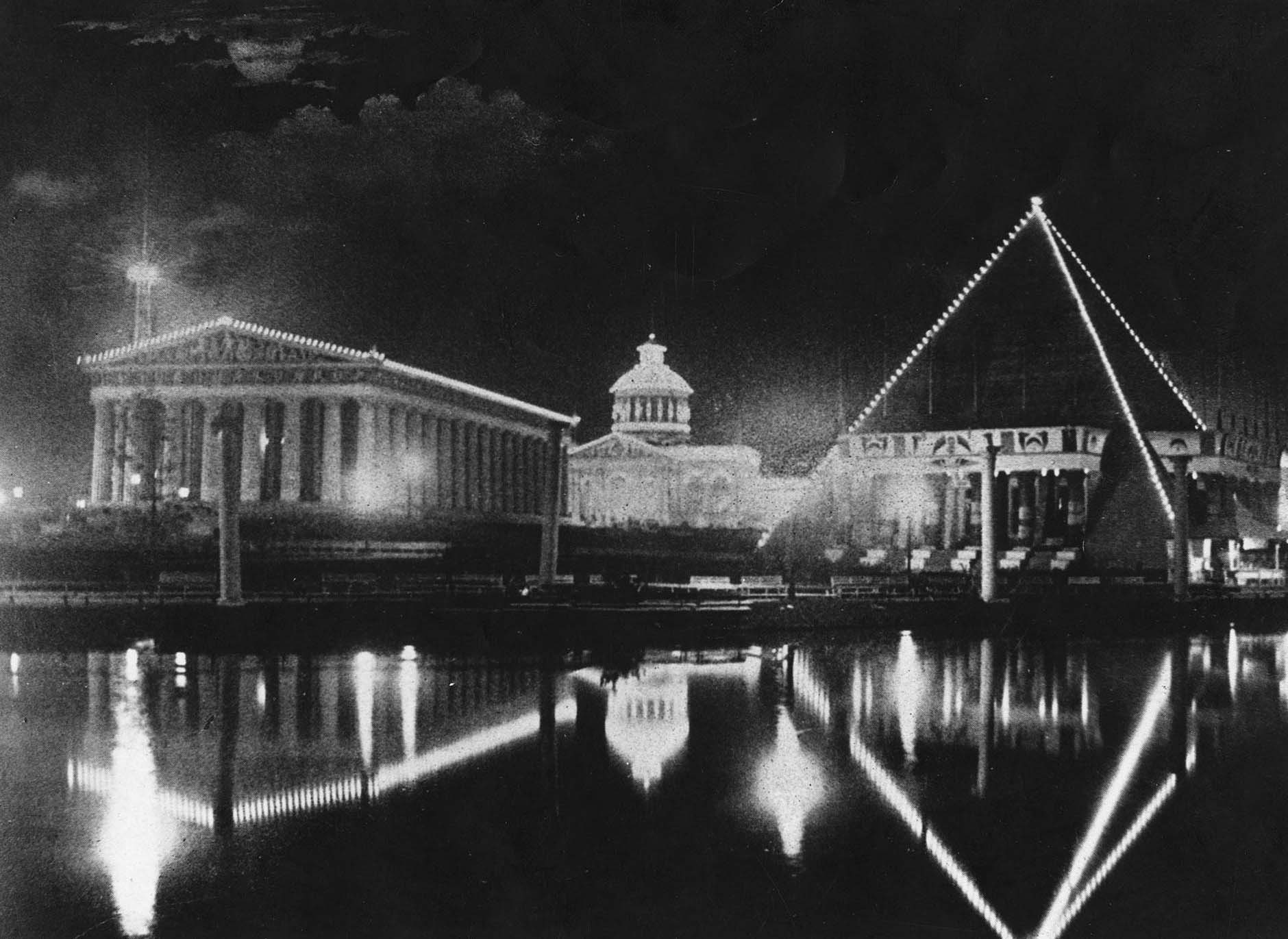
Picture from the 1897 Tennessee Centennial Exposition

Dudley was a member of the following: the German Chemical Society of Berlin, the Society of Chemical Industry of England, the Chemical Society of London, the American Chemical Society, the American Institute of Mining Engineers, the Engineering Association of the South and the American Association for the Advancement of Science. He was vice-president of the latter in 1889.

== Tennessee Centennial ==
Dudley also served as Director of Affairs of the Tennessee Centennial and International Exposition in 1897 "and handled it with such care that no deficit appeared at its end".

== College athletics ==
=== Vanderbilt Athletic Association ===
In 1886, the Vanderbilt Athletic Association was formed by president W. M. Baskerville. Most Vanderbilt students were members. Early sports played at the school were baseball, cycling, and track and field. For twenty five years, Dudley was president of the organization. Dudley added a running track to the Old Gym in 1895.

=== First football game ===
Vanderbilt played its first-ever football game (against the University of Nashville) in 1890 at Nashville Athletic Park, winning 40–0. After Nashville challenged Vanderbilt to play a Thanksgiving Day football game, Dudley sent out for the Athletic Association to meet. Dudley took the challenge seriously, feeling the university's pride at stake. To some 150 students in the gym, Vanderbilt athletics historian Bill Traughber notes how Dudley explained "if the challenge were met, a new era of athletics would be created with the game of football."

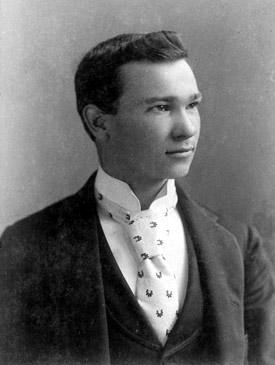
Elliott Jones

Dudley accompanied the team on all of its trips. "Too much cannot be said about William L. Dudley in connection with early football at Vanderbilt", said first team captain and fullback Elliott Jones. Dudley's picture adorned the wall of Jones' Kansas City office, and when asked who it was he would respond "The best friend of myself and every other student at Vanderbilt."

=== Southern Intercollegiate Athletic Association ===
Dudley was a member of the Intercollegiate Athletic Association of the United States (now the NCAA) and was primarily responsible for the formation of the Southern Intercollegiate Athletic Association (SIAA). In March 1888, the Vanderbilt Athletic Association tried to schedule a track meet at Vanderbilt with Southwestern Presbyterian University, Sewanee and Tennessee. Opposition from Sewanee prevented the initial meet, but on December 21, 1894, the SIAA was formed.

=== Football rules committee ===
In 1907, Dudley replaced Homer Curtiss of the University of Texas on the Rules Committee.

=== Dudley Field ===
==== Old ====
Vanderbilt's football stadiums have been named after Dudley for most of their existence. In 1892, the first Dudley Field was dedicated on October 21, with the first instance of the Tennessee–Vanderbilt football rivalry. Vanderbilt Law School currently resides at the site of old Dudley Field. When a new Dudley Field was built in 1922, the old stadium became known as Curry Field, named for Irby "Rabbit" Curry, a Vanderbilt football player who died in an aerial battle over France in World War I.

==== New ====
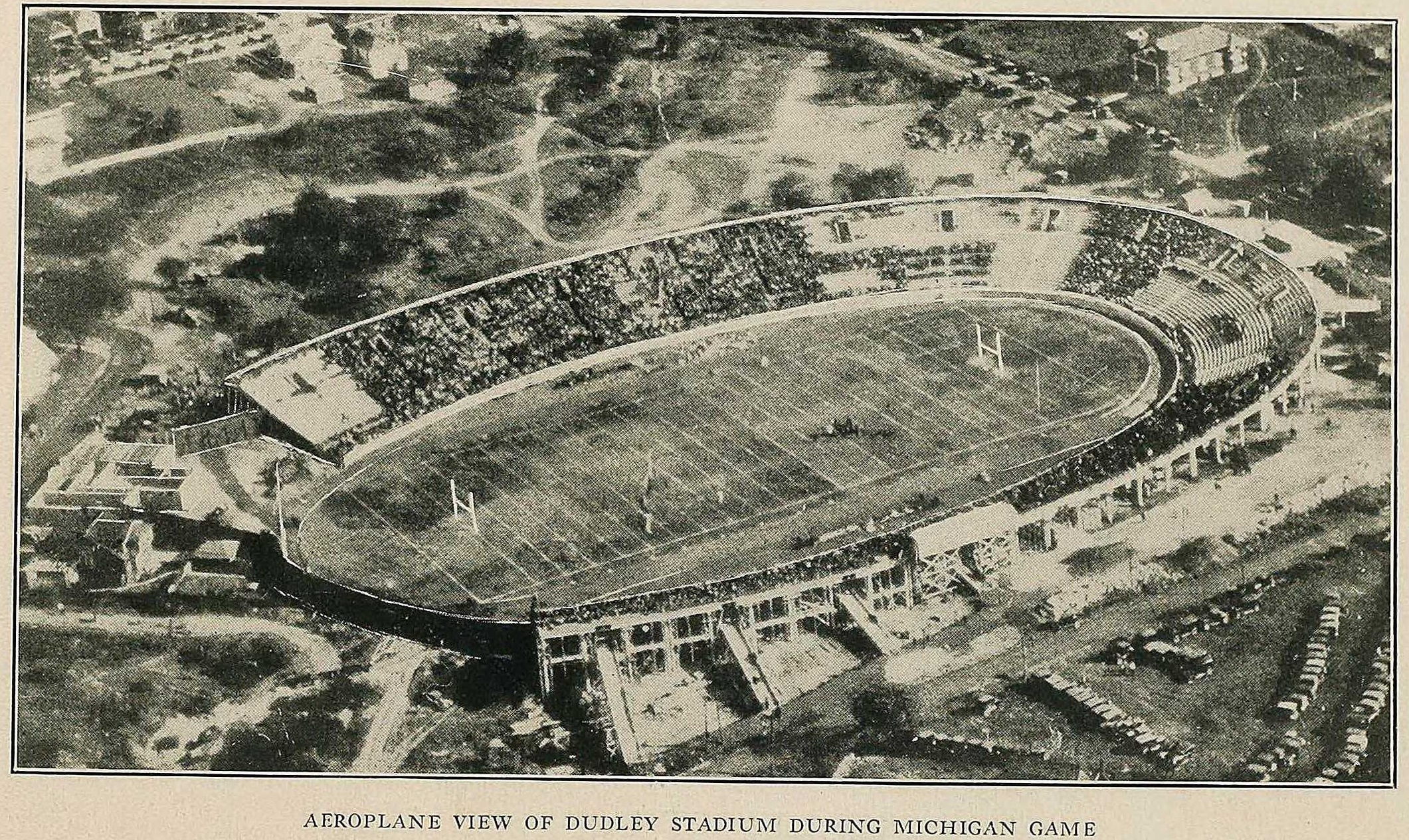
Dudley Field in 1922

After many years of success under head coach Dan McGugin and an undefeated 1921 season, Vanderbilt had outgrown its old stadium. Since there was not enough room to expand old Dudley Field at its site near Kirkland Hall, the Vanderbilt administrators purchased land adjacent to the present 25th Avenue South for the new facility. The steel-and-concrete structure cost about $200,000 and could seat 22,600. It was the first dedicated college football stadium in the South.

In the first game at the new stadium in 1922, against Michigan on October 14, the two teams played to a scoreless tie, which features prominently in the school's history. The stadium's dedication posthumously honored Dudley:

To William Lofland Dudley, Dean of Southern Athletics, scholar, gentleman, and friend, this ground is dedicated, and, as Dudley Field, is consecrated to the use of Vanderbilt and her sons forever.

— Charles S. Brown, Vanderbilt Athletic Association president

== Death and legacy ==
In the summer of 1914, Dudley was stricken with illness. Shortly after admittance to Clifton Springs Sanitarium in New York, he suffered a stroke which left him speechless. He recovered the use of his voice, but knew death was imminent, and started to travel back to Nashville where he wished to die. He died on September 8, 1914, before reaching Chicago. He was accompanied by his nephew, D. I. Miller. In 1919 the Dudley Fellowship in Chemistry was established in his memory.

== List of publications ==
- "A Theory of Dissolution" Scientific American (July 31, 1875)
- "Preliminary Notice of a New Volatile Alkaloid" J. Am. Chem Soc., 1 (1879), 286; and Am. Chem. J., 1, 154–55
- "The Volatile Oil of Mustard" Scientific American 42, Issue 21 (May 1880)
- "A chart for the chemical examination of urine; also tables of the metric weights and measures, and rules for converting the apothecaries' weights and measures into metric terms. For the use of students." (Cincinnati, 1880)
- "On a Modification of Boettger's Test for Sugar" Am. Chem. J., 2, (1880), 47.
- "A New Test for Gallic Acid" Am. Chem. J. 2 (1880), p. 48
- "Graphite From Ducktown, Tennessee" with F. W. Clarke Am. Chem. J. 2 (1881) p. 332
- "Holland's Process For Melting Iridium" Scientific Proceedings of the Ohio Mechanics' Institute, Volumes 1–2 (May 1881)
- "The Poisonous Effects of Cigarette Smoking" Medical News (Philadelphia, 1883) p. 53
- "Iridium" Mineral Resources of the United States (1883–84) p. 581
- "The Iridium Industry" Transactions of the American Institute of Mining Engineers 12 (1884) p. 577
- "Water of Crystallization" Science 4, No. 95 (Nov. 1884) p. 484
- "Water Crystallization" Lecture given at Cincinnati Society of Natural History (Mar. 1885)
- "Detection of Arsenic in Animal Tissues" The Cincinnati Lancet and Clinic 16 (Dec. 1885)
- "A note on the Product of Catharsis by Means of Hypodermic Medication" (with C. H. Castle) Medical News, Nov 6. 1886
- Lining for converters and furnaces Patented October 19, 1886
- Removing fiber from cotton-seed Patented Dec. 14, 1886
- "Report of the Committee on Weighing" (with committee) (1887)
- Process of depositing iridium and product of the same Patented May 3, 1887
- "Poisonous Effects of Cigarette Smoking (with W. J. Pulley) Medical News, September 15, 1888
- "Some Modifications of the Methods of Organic Analysis by Combustion" Am Chem. J. 10, No. 6. (1888)
- "The Nature of Amalgams" Address of W. L. Dudley, Proceedings of American Association for the Advancement of Science (Toronto, August 1889)
- "A curious occurrence of vivianite". American Journal of Science. s3-40 (236): 120–121. 1890. Bibcode:1890AmJS...40..120D. doi:10.2475/ajs.s3-40.236.120. ISSN 0002-9599. S2CID 130499837.
- "The Pierce Process for the Production of Charcoal, Wood Alcohol, and Acetic Acid" J. Ana. and App. Chem. 5, No. 5 (May 1891)
- "Process for the Removal of Lint from Cotton Seed" J. Ana. and App. Chem. 6, p. 140. (1892)
- "The Colors and Absorption: Spectra of Thin Metallic and of Incandescent Vapors of the Metals, with Some Observations on Electrical Volatility" Am. Chem. J. 14 (1892), 185
- "The Action of Gaseous Hydrochloric Acid and Oxygen on the Platinum Metals". Journal of the American Chemical Society. 15 (5): 272–274. 1893. Bibcode:1893JAChS..15..272D. doi:10.1021/ja02115a007. ISSN 0002-7863.
- "The Electrode-deposition of Iridium, a Method of Maintaining Uniform Composition of an Electroplating Bath without the Use of an Anode". Journal of the American Chemical Society. 15 (5): 274–276. 1893. doi:10.1021/ja02115a008. ISSN 0002-7863.
- "Nickelo-Nickelic Hydrate" The Chemical News and Journal of Physical Science 75 (1897) p. 65
- Snuff tablet Patented December 19, 1899.
- Separable buckle Patented April 25, 1905.
- Spark-arrester Patented September 25, 1906.
- "The Filtration of Alcoholic Liquids Through Wood Charcoal". Journal of the American Chemical Society. 30 (11): 1784–1789. 1908. Bibcode:1908JAChS..30.1784D. doi:10.1021/ja01953a016. ISSN 0002-7863.
- "Neon and Electric Waves". Science. 30 (772): 525–526. 1909. Bibcode:1909Sci....30..525D. doi:10.1126/science.30.772.525-a. ISSN 0036-8075. JSTOR 1635205. PMID 17836617. S2CID 591966. Zenodo: 1448030.
- "The Luminosity of Comets". Science. 32 (817): 286–288. 1910. Bibcode:1910Sci....32..286D. doi:10.1126/science.32.817.286. ISSN 0036-8075. JSTOR 1634827. PMID 17797823.
- "Researches In Electro-Metallurgy"
- "Researches In The Metallurgy Of Iridium"
- "New Method of Chemical Analysis of Organic Substances"
