= Dickert =

Dickert is a surname of German origin, derived from a medieval given name or a habitational/topographic name. Notable people with the surname include:

- Jake Dickert (born 1983), American college football coach
- John Dickert (born 1962), American politician
- Julius Dickert (1816–1896), German teacher and politician
- Wayne Dickert (born 1958), American slalom canoer

== See also ==
- Dicker (surname)
