= List of gridiron football rules =

The following is a description of the various and alternating rules of gridiron football. Numerous leagues or organizations tend to send a laundry list of rules in order to better distinguish themselves from their counterparts.

== American football (general) ==
=== Field and players ===
American football is played on a football field that is 360 by 160 feet (109.7 by 48.8 m). The longer boundary lines are sidelines, while the shorter boundary lines are end lines. Sidelines and end lines are out of bounds. Near each end of the field is a goal line; they are 100 yards (91.4 m) apart. A scoring area called an end zone extends 10 yards (9.1 m) beyond each goal line to each end line. The end zone includes the goal line but not the end line. While the playing field is effectively flat, it is common for a field to be built with a slight crown—with the middle of the field higher than the sides—to allow water to drain from the field.

Yard lines cross the field every 5 yards (4.6 m), and are numbered every 10 yards from each goal line to the 50-yard line, or midfield (similar to a typical rugby league field). Two rows of short lines, known as inbounds lines or hash marks, run at 1-yard (91.4 cm) intervals perpendicular to the sidelines near the middle of the field. All plays start with the ball on or between the hash marks. Because of the arrangement of the lines, the field is occasionally referred to as a gridiron.

At the back of each end zone are two goalposts (also called uprights) connected by a crossbar 10 feet (3.05 m) from the ground. For high skill levels, the posts are 222 inches (5.64 m) apart. For lower skill levels, these are widened to 280 inches (7.11 m).

Each team has 11 players on the field at a time. However, teams may substitute for any or all of their players, if time allows, during the break between plays. As a result, players have very specialized roles, and, sometimes (although rarely) almost all of the (at least) 46 active players on an NFL team will play in any given game. Thus, teams are divided into three separate units: the offense, the defense and the special teams.

=== Start of halves ===
Similarly to association football, the game begins with a coin toss to determine which team will kick off to begin the game and which goal each team will defend. The options are presented again to start the second half; the choices for the first half do not automatically determine the start of the second half (i.e. it is possible for the same team to kick off both halves). The referee conducts the coin toss with the captains (or sometimes coaches) of the opposing teams. The team that wins the coin toss has three options:

1. They may choose whether to kick or receive the opening kickoff.
2. They may choose which goal to defend.
3. They may choose to defer the first choice to the other team and have first choice to start the second half.

Whatever the first team chooses, the second team has the option on the other choice (for example, if the first team elects to receive at the start of the game, the second team can decide which goal to defend).

At the start of the second half, the options to kick, receive, or choose a goal to defend are presented to the captains again. The team which did not choose first to start the first half (or which deferred its privilege to choose first) now gets first choice of options.

=== Game duration ===
A standard football game consists of four 15-minute quarters (12-minute quarters in high-school football and often shorter at lower levels, usually one minute per grade [e.g. 9-minute quarters for freshman games]), with a 12-minute half-time intermission (30 minutes in the Super Bowl) after the second quarter in the NFL (college halftimes are 20 minutes; in high school the interval is 15 or 20 minutes; 10 minutes for lower grades). The clock stops after certain plays; therefore, a game can last considerably longer (often more than three hours in real time), and if a game is broadcast on television, TV timeouts are taken at certain intervals of the game to broadcast commercials outside of game action. If an NFL game is tied after four quarters, the teams play an additional period, timed like the fourth quarter, lasting up to 10 minutes. There is a coin toss in the NFL just like the beginning of the game. If the receiving team scores a safety during the possession, the game is over & they win. If they kick a field goal, then the other team gets a possession. If they score a touchdown, they win. If they tie the score by kicking a field goal, then whoever scores next wins. If the team with the first possession turns the ball over without scoring any points, then the first team to score, wins. If the defense scores a touchdown through an interception or fumble recovery, or they get a safety, then they win. In a regular-season NFL game, if no one scores in the overtime, the game ends tied. In an NFL playoff game, multiple 15-minute overtime periods are played, as needed, to determine a winner. These periods are timed as if a game had started over. Since the 2022 playoffs & 2025 regular season, teams will be guaranteed one possession to start first overtime. In the extremely rare case a game would go as far as a third OT—which has never happened in the NFL—there would be no "halftime intermission"; play would resume with a kickoff similar to a normal third quarter.

No overtime is played in NFL preseason up to 1973 & since 2021.

College overtime rules are more complicated and are described in Overtime (sport).

=== Advancing the ball ===
Advancing the ball in American football resembles the six-tackle rule and the play-the-ball in rugby league. The team that takes possession of the ball (the offense) has four attempts, called downs, in which to advance the ball 10 yards (9.1 m) toward their opponent's (the defense's) end zone. When the offense succeeds in gaining at least 10 yards, it gets a first down, meaning the team has another set of four downs to gain yet another 10 yards or to score. If the offense fails to gain a first down (10 yards) after 4 downs, the other team gets possession of the ball at the point where the fourth down ended, beginning with their first down to advance the ball in the opposite direction.

Except at the beginning of halves and after scores, the ball is always put into play by a snap. Offensive players line up facing defensive players at the line of scrimmage (the position on the field where the play begins). One offensive player, the center, then passes (or "snaps") the ball backwards between his legs to a teammate behind him, usually the quarterback.

Players can then advance the ball in two ways:

1. By running with the ball, also known as rushing.
2. By throwing the ball to a teammate, known as a forward pass or as passing the football. The forward pass is a key factor distinguishing American and Canadian football from other football sports. The offense can throw the ball forward only once during a down and only from behind the line of scrimmage. The ball can be thrown, pitched, handed-off, or tossed sideways or backwards at any time.

A down ends, and the ball becomes dead, after any of the following:

- The player with the ball is forced to the ground (a tackle) or has his forward progress halted by members of the other team (as determined by an official).
- A forward pass flies beyond the dimensions of the field (out of bounds) or touches the ground before it is caught. This is known as an incomplete pass. The ball is returned to the most recent line of scrimmage for the next down.
- The ball or the player with the ball goes out of bounds.
- A team scores.

Officials blow a whistle to notify players that the down is over.

Before each down, each team chooses a play, or coordinated movements and actions, that the players should follow on a down. Sometimes, downs themselves are referred to as "plays."

=== Change of possession ===
The offense maintains possession of the ball unless one of the following things occurs:

- The team fails to get a first down— i.e., in four downs they fail to move the ball past a line 10 yards ahead of where they got their last first down (it is possible to be downed behind the current line of scrimmage, losing "yardage"). The defensive team takes over the ball at the spot where the 4th-down play ends. A change of possession in this manner is commonly called a turnover on downs, but is not credited as a defensive "turnover" in official statistics. Instead, it goes against the offense's 4th down efficiency percentage.
- The offense scores a touchdown or field goal. The team that scored then kicks the ball to the other team in a special play called a kickoff.
- The offense punts the ball to the defense. A punt is a kick in which a player drops the ball and kicks it before it hits the ground. Punts are nearly always made on fourth down (though see quick kick), when the offensive team does not want to risk giving up the ball to the other team at its current spot on the field (through a failed attempt to make a first down) and feels it is too far from the other team's goal posts to attempt a field goal.
- A defensive player catches a forward pass. This is called an interception, and the player who makes the interception can run with the ball until he is tackled, forced out of bounds, or scores.
- An offensive player drops the ball (a fumble) and a defensive player picks it up. As with interceptions, a player recovering a fumble can run with the ball until tackled, forced out of bounds, or scores. Backward passes that are not caught do not cause the down to end like incomplete forward passes do; instead the ball is still live as if it had been fumbled. Lost fumbles and interceptions are together known as turnovers.
- The offensive team misses a field goal attempt. The defensive team gets the ball at the spot where the previous play began (or, in the NFL, at the spot of the kick). If the unsuccessful kick was attempted from within 20 yards (18.3 m) of the end zone, the other team gets the ball at its own 20-yard line (that is, 20 yards from the end zone). If a field goal is missed or blocked and the ball remains in the field of play, a defensive player may pick up the ball and attempt to advance it.
- While in his own end zone, an offensive ball carrier is tackled, forced out of bounds, loses the ball out of bounds, or the offense commits certain fouls. This fairly rare occurrence is called a safety.
- An offensive ball carrier fumbles the ball forward into the opposing end zone, and then the ball goes out of bounds. This extremely rare occurrence leads to a touchback, with the ball going over to the opposing team at their 20-yard line (Note that touchbacks during non-offensive special teams plays, such as punts and kickoffs, are quite common).

=== Scoring ===
A team scores points by the following plays:

- A touchdown (TD) is worth 6 points. It is scored when a player runs the ball into or catches a pass in his opponent's end zone. A touchdown is analogous to a try in rugby. Unlike rugby, a player does not have to touch the ball to the ground to score; a touchdown is scored any time a player has possession of the ball but not while the ball is on or beyond the opponents' goal line (or the plane above it).
  - After a touchdown, the scoring team attempts a try (which is also analogous to the conversion in rugby). The ball is placed at the other team's 3-yard (2.7 m) line (the 2-yard (1.8 m) line in the NFL on 2-point conversions or 15-yard (13.7 m) for 1-point conversions). The team can attempt to kick it over the crossbar and through the goal posts in the manner of a field goal for 1 point (an extra point or point-after touchdown (PAT)), or run or pass it into the end zone in the manner of a touchdown for 2 points (a two-point conversion). In college football, the NFL, USFL and Texas high school football, if the defense intercepts or recovers a fumble during a one or two-point conversion attempt and returns it to the opposing end zone, the defensive team is awarded the two points.
- A field goal (FG) is worth 3 points, and it is scored by kicking the ball over the crossbar and through the goal posts (uprights). Field goals may be placekicked (kicked when the ball is held vertically against the ground by a teammate) or drop-kicked (extremely uncommon in the modern game, with only two successes in sixty-plus years in the NFL). A field goal is usually attempted on fourth down instead of a punt when the ball is close to the opponent's goal line, or, when there is little or no time left to otherwise score. A fair catch kick is also 3.
- A safety, worth 2 points, is scored by the opposing team when the team in possession at the end of a down is responsible for the ball becoming dead behind its own goal line. For instance, a safety is scored by the defense if an offensive player is tackled, goes out of bounds, or fumbles the ball out of bounds in his own end zone. Safeties are relatively rare. Note that, though even more rare, the team initially on offense during a down can score a safety if a player of the original defense gains possession of the ball in front of his own goal line and then carries the ball or fumbles it into his own end zone where it becomes dead. However, if the ball becomes dead behind the goal line of the team in possession and its opponent is responsible for the ball being there (for instance, if the defense intercepts a forward pass in its own end zone and the ball becomes dead before the ball is advanced out of the end zone) it is a touchback: no points are scored and the team last in possession keeps possession with a first down at its own 20-yard line. In amateur and pro football, in the extremely rare instance that a safety is scored on a try, it is worth only 1 point.

=== Kickoffs and free kicks ===
Each half begins with a kickoff. Teams also kick off after scoring touchdowns and field goals. The ball is kicked using a kicking tee from the team's own 35-yard (32 m) line in the NFL and college football (as of the 2011 season). The other team's kick returner tries to catch the ball and advance it as far as possible. Where he is stopped is the point where the offense will begin its drive, or series of offensive plays. If the kick returner catches the ball in his own end zone, he can either run with the ball, or elect for a touchback by kneeling in the end zone, in which case the receiving team then starts its offensive drive from its own 20-yard line (25-yard line in NFL, since 2015). A touchback also occurs when the kick goes out-of-bounds in the end zone, or since 2018, the ball hits the ground on the goal line and in the end zone. A kickoff that goes out-of-bounds anywhere other than the end zone before being touched by the receiving team is a foul, and the ball will be placed where it went out of bounds or 30 yards (27 m) from the kickoff spot, depending on which is more advantageous to the opposite team. Unlike with punts, once a kickoff goes 10 yards and the ball has hit the ground, it can be recovered by the kicking team. A team, especially one who is losing, can try to take advantage of this by attempting an onside kick. Punts and turnovers in the end zone can also end in a touchback.

After safeties, the team that gave up the points must free kick the ball to the other team from its own 20-yard line.

=== Penalties ===
Fouls (a type of rule violation) are punished with penalties against the offending team. Most penalties result in moving the football towards the offending team's end zone. If the penalty would move the ball more than half the distance towards the offender's end zone, the penalty becomes half the distance to the goal instead of its normal value.

Most penalties result in replaying the down. Some defensive penalties give the offense an automatic first down. Conversely, some offensive penalties result in loss of a down (loss of the right to repeat the down). If a penalty gives the offensive team enough yardage to gain a first down, they get a first down, as usual.

If a foul occurs during a down, an official throws a yellow penalty flag near the spot of the foul. When the down ends, the team that did not commit the foul has the option of accepting the penalty, or declining the penalty and accepting the result of the down.

=== Variations ===
Variations on these basic rules exist, particularly touch and flag football, which are designed as non-contact or limited-contact alternatives to the relative violence of regular American football. In touch and flag football, tackling is not permitted. Offensive players are "tackled" when a defender tags them or removes a flag from their body, respectively. Both of these varieties are played mainly in informal settings such as intramural or youth games. Another variation is "wrap", where a player is "tackled" when another player wraps his arms around the ball carrier. Professional, intercollegiate, and varsity-level high school football invariably use the standard tackling rules.

Another variation is with the number of players on the field. In sparsely populated areas, it is not uncommon to find high school football teams playing nine-man football, eight-man football or six-man football. Players often play on offense as well as defense. The Arena Football League was a league that played eight-man football, but also had played indoors and on a much smaller playing surface with rule changes to encourage a much more offensive game.

Another variation often played by American children is called Catch and Run. In this game, the children split into two teams and line up at opposite sides of the playing field. One side throws the ball to the other side. If the opposing team catches the ball, that player tries to run to the throwing teams touchdown without being tagged/tackled. If no one catches the ball or if the player is tagged/tackled, then that team has to throw the ball to the opposing team. This repeats until the game (or recess period) is deemed over.

== Professional football (American) ==
=== American Football League ===
The NFL adopted many ideas introduced by the AFL, including names on player jerseys and revenue sharing of gate and television receipts. The older league also adopted the practice of using the stadium scoreboard clocks to keep track of the official game time, instead of just having a stopwatch used by the referee. The AFL played a 14-game schedule for its entire existence, starting in 1960. The NFL, which had played a 12-game schedule since 1947, changed to a 14-game schedule in 1961, a year after the American Football League instituted it; from 1978 to 2020, it was a 16-game season; it has been 17-game seasons since 2021. The AFL also introduced the two-point conversion to professional football thirty-four years before the NFL instituted it in 1994 (college football had adopted the two-point conversion in the late 1950s). All of these innovations pioneered by the AFL, including its more exciting style of play and colorful uniforms, have essentially made today's pro football more like the AFL than like the old-line NFL. The AFL's challenge to the NFL also laid the groundwork for the Super Bowl, which has become the standard for championship contests in the United States.

=== NFL Europa ===
The NFL has traditionally used a sudden death format for overtime. Regular-season games have a single period of overtime during which the first team to score wins the game. If neither team scores, the game is declared a tie. In post-season games, overtime is extended indefinitely until one team scores. In NFL Europa, however, the overtime period lasted for 10 minutes with the requirement that each team must have the opportunity of possession at least once. So, in NFL Europa, it was possible for one team to score in overtime, then have to kick off to the opponent and give them a chance to either equalize or win the game. The winner was the team with the highest score after both teams had had possession. If the score was even after the second team's possession, the overtime would continue as sudden death. If still tied after 10 minutes, the game ends as a tie. Only two games ever remained tied after overtime in WLAF/NFL Europa history: London Monarchs versus Birmingham Fire in Week 4 of the 1992 season, and Berlin Thunder at Hamburg Sea Devils, on April 1, 2006. The score of both games was 17–17.

With association football being the traditionally popular sport in Europe and American football being a relative newcomer, the rules were changed slightly to encourage a greater element of kicking, which was intended to make the game more enjoyable for football and rugby fans. The league did this by awarding 4 points to field goals of more than 50 yards, as opposed to 3 points in the NFL. This had the interesting side-effect that a touchdown and PAT lead (7 points) could be equaled by one regular field goal (3 points) as well as a long field goal (4 points). This concept would later be adopted by the proposed New United States Football League, with the distance required for the fourth point increased from 50 to 55 yards.

Also, there was a requirement that at least one player of Non-American extraction, referred to as "national" players, participate in every down for both teams as of the 2006 season (in previous seasons one was required to play only on every down of every other series). In addition to European players a number of Mexican and Japanese players played as national players. Up until the 2004 season, kicked conversion attempts and short field goals were attempted by national players. Since there are few European players who have had the chance to compete at a level comparable to U.S. college football and the NFL, many, if not most, of the European players ended up as kickers.

Among the notable national players were Scott McCready, an English wide receiver who played some preseason games for the New England Patriots, the Claymores' wide receiver Scott Couper, who played a pre-season game for the Chicago Bears, Constantin Ritzmann, a German defensive end who had played for the University of Tennessee, and Rob Hart, an English rugby player who became a placekicker; he kicked barefoot.

=== United Football League ===
Like previous football leagues, the UFL has instituted several mostly minor rules changes that will differ from the NFL's rules. Though the league has indicated it would mostly adhere to standard rules, there are a few differences, as follows:

- No Tuck Rule – The Tuck rule is one of the most controversial rules in the NFL. In the NFL, if a passer brings his arm forward in a passing motion and then loses possession of the ball as he is attempting to tuck it back toward his body, it's considered a forward pass (and thus an incomplete pass if the ball hits the ground). In the UFL, it would be called a fumble.
- Touchdown celebrations – Celebrations, individual or group, will only take place in the endzones and on the bench area.
- Fumbling out of the endzones- If the ball is fumbled out of the endzone, it will be placed back at the spot of the fumble, pending which team last had possession.
- Intentional grounding – A quarterback is allowed to intentionally ground the ball anywhere behind the line of scrimmage if he is under pressure.
- Instant replay – All reviews will be viewed upstairs by the replay official and he will only have 90 seconds for review.
- Overtime – Both teams will be guaranteed at least one possession. When a team scores, the other team will get a last chance to score on the next drive.
- Standardized uniforms – Unlike most other leagues, the UFL's four inaugural teams have uniforms with identical designs, with the only differences being the colors of the jerseys—black for New York, silver for Las Vegas (an homage to the team's home stadium, formerly known as the Silver Bowl), blue for Florida, green for California. The team's logo consists of a two-letter abbreviation indicating its home. As such, the league will not need to use separate "home and away" dark and light jerseys.

=== United States Football League ===
At first the USFL competed with the older, more established National Football League by following the David Dixon plan and trying not to compete directly with it, primarily by playing its games on a March–June schedule but also having slightly different rules, most notably:

- The two-point conversion (since adopted by the NFL, in 1994).
- The college rule of stopping the clock after first downs was used only for the final two minutes of each half.

Come 2022, the rules are the same as in the NFL, but in overtime, will employ a best-of-three-round conversions from the 2-yard line. Whoever scores more points in three rounds wins it; otherwise, teams play sudden-death rounds until one team scores.

==== New United States Football League ====
Like the XFL, which adopted a number of unusual rules to drive fan curiosity, the USFL has announced the possibility of a number of new rules (many of which were adopted from previous leagues):

- No pre-season, just a regular season (adopted from the World Football League, although the WFL played a 20-week regular season)
- No touchbacks on kickoffs; if the ball goes out of the endzone, it will be placed at the 15-yard line (adopted from Arena Football League)
- Field goals of 51 yards or more will be four points (adopted from NFL Europe)
- A three-point conversion will be placed at the 10-yard line (adopted from the XFL)
- One foot inbounds for a catch (a rule in virtually every league except the NFL)
- No kneel-downs (adopted from Arena Football League, abolished since 2018)
- Safeties are worth four points
- Overtime will be played like in college and the CFL

No word has been announced on whether the league will continue to follow the path of the XFL and adopt other rules like the forward motion rule used by the WFL, XFL and arena leagues, as well as in Canadian football.

=== World Football League ===
The WFL had several important rules differences from the National Football League of that era, and many were eventually adopted by the older league:

- Touchdowns were worth 7 points, instead of 6.
- Conversions were called "Action Points" and could only be scored via a run or pass play (as opposed to by kick as in other football leagues), and were worth one point. The ball was placed on the five-yard line for an Action Point. This rule was a revival of a 1968 preseason experiment by the NFL and American Football League. The XFL employed a similar rule 27 years later.
- Kickoffs were from the 30-yard line instead of the 40. Before 1974, NFL teams kicked off from the 40; from 1974 to 1993 & since 2011, the NFL moved its kickoffs back to the 35, and from 1994 to 2010, the kickoff line was pushed back to the 30.
- Receivers needed only one foot in bounds for a legal pass reception, instead of two feet in the NFL then and now. College and high school football, the Arena Football League, and the CFL have always used the one-foot rule.
- Bump-and-run pass coverage was outlawed once a receiver was 3 yards beyond the line of scrimmage. The NFL later adopted this rule, with a 5-yard bump zone.
- The goalposts were placed at the end line (the back of the end zone). At that time, college football goalposts were at the end line, but the NFL had its goalposts at the goal line from 1933 through 1973. Starting with the 1974 season, the NFL also moved its posts back to the end line.
- Missed field goals were returned to the line of scrimmage or the 20-yard line, whichever was farther from the goal line. The NFL also adopted this rule for its 1974 season, then replaced the line of scrimmage with the point of the kick in 1994. Before this rule, missed field goals were (if unreturned) touchbacks, with the ball placed at the 20-yard line. U.S. college football later adopted this rule, but left the point as the line of scrimmage rather than the point of the placement.
- A player in motion was allowed to move toward the line of scrimmage before the snap, as long as he was behind the line of scrimmage at the snap. This rule had never been used at any level of outdoor American football, but was (and still is) part of Canadian football. This rule is used in the Arena Football League and was used in the XFL.
- Punt returners were prohibited from using the fair catch, although the covering team could not come within 5 yards of the kick returner until he caught the ball. This rule also came from Canadian football, which still uses it, as does Arena football with kickoffs and missed field goals. The XFL also used the so-called "halo rule".
- Penalties for offensive holding and ineligible receiver downfield were 10 yards, instead of 15. Several years later, these became 10-yard penalties at all levels of football. Still later, the ineligible receiver penalty was changed to 5 yards (with loss of down).
- The WFL's original overtime system was like nothing used in any form of American football before or since; it was more similar to the system long used in international soccer. Overtime in the regular season was one fixed 15-minute period, divided into two halves of 7½ minutes, each starting with a kickoff by one of the teams. The complete overtime was always played; there was no "sudden death" feature. In 1975, the WFL changed its overtime to the 15-minute sudden-death period, which the NFL adopted in 1974 and still uses today, albeit 5 minutes shorter since 2017.
- Limited (or no) pre-season games. In 1974 and 1975, NFL teams played six pre-season games and 14 regular-season games (which was changed in 1978 to the current four pre-season and 16 regular-season games). In contrast, the WFL's 1974 schedule called for 20 regular-season games and no pre-season games; in 1975, it was 18 regular-season games and two pre-season games.
- Summertime football. The NFL's regular season started on September 15 in 1974 and on September 21 in 1975; the WFL's regular season started on July 10 in 1974 and on July 26 in 1975 (with the 1975 pre-season starting on July 5). The Canadian Football League, which must contend with colder winters than American leagues, has always played during the summer with a similar schedule.
- Weeknight football (1974). While NFL games were played mostly on Sundays and a game on Monday Night, the WFL's 1974 schedule called for Wednesday night football (with a Thursday night national TV game). This scheduling format was abandoned in 1975. The featured Thursday night game was later adopted as "Thursday Night Football" by the NFL in 2006.
- The "Dickerod". Instead of using a ten-yard chain strung between two sticks for measuring first down yardage, the WFL used a device called the "Dickerod," obstensibly named for its inventor. This was a single stick, roughly ten feet tall, mounted on a base which allowed it to pivot from side to side. The stick was swung down to ground level when a first down was being set, and a marker that slid along the shaft was fixed in place to line up with the nearest gridiron line (the major yard lines spaced every five yards). When that was set, the stick was swung back to the upright position. When a measurement was needed by the officials, the Dickerod was brought out to the ball position, the shaft swung down to ground level, the marker lined up with the nearest gridiron line, and the measurement was taken. (In all other forms of football today, a similar marker is clipped to the standard ten-yard chain, also lining up with a gridiron line.)

=== World League of American Football ===
The WLAF played two seasons with 10 teams in the spring of 1991 and 1992, with the World Bowl as championship games. Rules unique to WLAF included assigning increasing point value to field goals based on distance, and a requirement that at least one player of non-US nationality participate in at least every other series of downs.

New ideas were successfully tested, like using the two-point conversion rule also on the professional field before adopting it in the NFL in 1994. Other minor tweaks in gameplay, such as a shorter kickoff tee, were also first used in the WLAF.

=== XFL ===
Despite boasts by WWF promoters of a "rules-light" game and universally negative reviews from the mainstream sports media early on, the XFL played a brand of 11-man outdoor football that was recognizable, aside from the opening game sprint to determine possession and some other changes, some modified during the season. In fact, most of the rule changes were inherited from the 1970s World Football League.

==== Grass stadiums ====
All XFL teams had to play in outdoor stadiums with grass surfaces. No domed stadiums, artificial turf stadiums, or retractable roof stadiums were allowed. (This happened to occur during now-extinct Giants Stadium's brief experiment with natural grass; the stadium's turf did not hold up well in the winter and early spring weather and the stadium reverted to its traditional artificial turf in 2003.)

==== Opening scramble ====
Replacing the coin toss at the beginning of each game was an event in which one player from each team sought to recover a football 20 yards away in order to determine possession. Both players lined up side by side on one of the 30-yard lines, with the ball being placed at the 50-yard line. At the whistle, the two players would run toward the ball and attempt to gain possession; whichever player gained possession first was allowed to choose possession (as if he had won a coin toss in other leagues). The scramble led to the first XFL injury: Orlando Rage free safety Hassan Shamsid-Deen separated his shoulder in the scramble during the XFL's opening weekend. This injury would keep Shamsid-Deen out for the rest of the season.

==== No PAT (point after touchdown) kicks ====
After touchdowns there were no extra point kicks, due to the XFL's perception that an extra point kick was a "guaranteed point." To earn a point after a touchdown, teams ran a single offensive down from the two-yard line (functionally identical to the NFL/NCAA/CFL two-point conversion), but for just a single point. By the playoffs, two-point and three-point conversions had been added to the rules. Teams could opt for the bonus points by playing the conversion farther back from the goal line.

This rule, as originally implemented, was similar to the WFL's "Action Point," and was identical to a 1968 experiment by the NFL and American Football League, used only in preseason interleague games that year.

==== Overtime ====
Ties were resolved in similar fashion to the NCAA and present-day CFL game, with at least one possession by each team, starting from the opponent's 20-yard line. There were differences: there were no first downs – teams had to score within four downs, and the team that had possession first in overtime could not attempt a field goal until fourth down. If that team managed to score a touchdown in fewer than four downs, the second team would only have that same number of downs to match or beat the result. If the score was still tied after one overtime period, the team that played second on offense in the first OT would start on offense in the second OT.

==== Bump and run ====
The XFL allowed full bump and run coverage early in the season. Defensive backs were allowed to hit wide receivers any time before the quarterback released the ball, as long as the hit came from the front or the side (similar to the NCAA). In an effort to increase offensive production, bump and run was restricted to the first five yards from the line of scrimmage (similar to NFL) following the fourth week of the season.

==== Forward motion ====
Unlike the NFL, but like the World Football League and Arena football before it, the XFL allowed one offensive player to move toward the line of scrimmage once he was outside the tackles.

==== Halo rule / live punts ====
The heavily hyped "no fair catch" rule (announcers tended to mention it on almost every punt/kickoff) was paired with a five-yard zone excluding players of the kicking team around potential returners before the ball touched them or the ground, similar to rules in Canadian football, rugby football, and contemporary NCAA rules (where the term "halo" was applied, though the XFL called it instead the "danger zone"). But instead of making punt returns more exciting, it often had the opposite effect, since the XFL players' inexperience with the rule caused a high number of game-delaying penalties.

The fair catch had previously been abolished from Canadian rules, NCAA rules (but only for the 1950 season), and Rugby league.

Another difference was that after touching ground 25 yards or more beyond the line of scrimmage, punts could be recovered and advanced by all players of the kicking team. This led to more quick kicks being taken on third-down-and-long situations in the one season of the small league than had been seen in the NFL over several preceding decades of longer seasons. XFL's "innovation" was similar to a rule that had been in effect in American football in the 1910s and part of the 1920s.

XFL penalized 10 yards from the succeeding spot punts going out of bounds, even if they first touched the ground (but not a player of the receiving team).

For the initial weeks of the season, the XFL forbade all players on the kicking team from going downfield before a kick was made from scrimmage on that down, similarly to a rule the NFL considered in 1974. For the rest of the season the XFL modified it to allow one player closest to each sideline downfield ahead of the kick, the same modification the NFL adopted to their change just before their 1974 exhibition games started.

The purpose of these provisions was to keep play going after the ball was punted, encouraging the kicking team to make the ball playable and the receiving team to run it back.

==== Roster and salaries ====
The XFL limited each team to an unusually low 38 players (roughly analogous to the 42 for CFL rosters, as opposed to 53 on NFL teams and 80 or more on unlimited college rosters). This resulted, most commonly, in each team only carrying two quarterbacks and one kicker, who doubled as the punter.

The XFL paid standardized player salaries. Quarterbacks earned U.S. $5,000 per week, kickers earned $3,500, and all other uniformed players earned $4,500 per week, though a few players got around these restrictions (Los Angeles Xtreme players Noel Prefontaine, the league's lone punting specialist, and Matt Malloy, a wide receiver) by having themselves listed as backup quarterbacks. Players on a winning team received a bonus of $2,500 for the week, $7,500 for winning a playoff game. The team that won the championship game split $1,000,000 (roughly $25,000 per player). Furthermore, players did not receive any fringe benefits, meaning players had to pay for their own health insurance.

=== Alliance of American Football ===
The Alliance of American Football (AAF), which folded before the end of its inaugural 2019 season, had several significant rule differences from other leagues.

==== Kickoffs ====
The AAF eliminated kickoffs. Possession at the start of each half, or after any offensive score, began on the "receiving" team's 25-yard line (the same point as the NFL then used after touchbacks on kickoffs), barring the "kicking" team choosing to attempt an "onside conversion". After a safety, the scoring team would take possession at its own 35-yard line, again with the caveat that the scored-upon team could attempt an onside conversion.

The onside conversion, which replaced the onside kick, was a play unique to the AAF. Following an offensive score, a team could choose to attempt a scrimmage play from its own 28-yard line; if it gained 12 or more yards on that play, it would keep possession, with play resuming from the final spot of the ball. A failed attempt would result in the scored-upon team taking possession at the final spot of the ball. This play could only be attempted if the scoring team was trailing by at least 17 points at any time in the game, or during the last 2 minutes of the first half or last 5 minutes of the game. The onside conversion was also available to the scored-upon team following a safety (with the same restrictions regarding score and/or time remaining), with the spot of the play being that team's own 18-yard line and the required distance to gain being the same 12 yards.

==== Defensive restrictions ====
The defense could not advance more than five players across the line of scrimmage, and no defensive player could cross the line of scrimmage from more than 2 yards outside the offensive tackles. Violations were categorized as "illegal defense" and resulted in a 15-yard penalty.

==== Conversions ====
The AAF prohibited conversion kicks—all conversion attempts were required to be regular scrimmage plays (runs or passes), and if successful were scored as two-point conversions.

==== Overtime ====
In regular-season play, only one overtime period was played, using "Kansas Playoff" rules with the spot of possession being the defensive team's 10-yard line. Each team had four downs to score a touchdown, with a score followed by a two-point conversion attempt. Field goals were prohibited. If the game remained tied after each team had one possession, it ended in a tie. Reports varied on the overtime system the AAF would have used if it had reached the postseason.

== College football ==
Teams get 3 timeouts per half, which can't carry over to next half or overtime, plus one per overtime period (same as in the NFL, but allows two per overtime period). Although rules for the high school, college, and NFL games are generally consistent, there are several minor differences. The NCAA Football Rules Committee determines the playing rules for Division I (both Bowl and Championship Subdivisions), II, and III games (the National Association of Intercollegiate Athletics (NAIA) is a separate organization, but uses the NCAA rules).

- A pass is ruled complete if one of the receiver's feet is inbounds at the time of the catch. In the NFL both feet must be inbounds.
- A player is considered down when any part of his body other than the feet or hands touches the ground (from a tackle or otherwise), with the sole exception of the holder for field goal and extra point attempts. In the NFL a player is active until he is tackled or forced down another way by a member of the opposing team (down by contact).
- The clock stops after the offense completes a first down and begins again—assuming it is following a play in which the clock would not normally stop—once the referee declares the ball ready for play, in Division III & NAIA; the top two divisions come 2023 will see the clock run outside of two minutes left in each half. In the NFL the clock does not explicitly stop for a first down.
- Overtime was introduced in 1996, eliminating ties. Since 2021, during overtime, each team is given one possession from its opponent's twenty-five yard line with no game clock, despite the one timeout per period and use of play clock; the procedure repeats for one more possession if needed; all possessions thereafter will be from the opponent's 3-yard line. Whoever leads after both possessions will be declared the winner. If the teams remain tied, overtime periods continue, with a coin flip determining the first possession. Possessions alternate with each overtime, until one team leads the other at the end of the overtime. A two-point conversion is required if a touchdown is scored in double overtime. From triple overtime, two-point conversions are employed hereafter. (In the NFL, overtime is decided by a 10-minute sudden-death quarter, and regular season games can still end in a tie if neither team scores. Overtime for regular season games in the NFL began with the 1974 season, but reduced since 2017. In the post-season, if the teams are still tied, teams will play multiple 15-minute overtime periods until whoever scores. The first overtime, since 2022 playoffs & since 2025, guarantees teams one possession.)
- Extra point tries are attempted from the three-yard line. The NFL uses the 2-yard line for 2-point conversions or 15-yard line for 1-point conversions.
- The defensive team may score two points on a point-after touchdown attempt by returning a blocked kick, fumble, or interception into the opposition's end zone. In addition, if the defensive team gains possession, but then moves backwards into the endzone and is stopped, a one-point safety will be awarded to the offense, although, unlike a real safety, the offense kicks off, opposed to the team charged with the safety. In the NFL, a conversion attempt ends when the defending team gains possession of the football.
- The two-minute warning has been used in college football since 2024, except in rare cases where the scoreboard clock has malfunctioned and is not being used.
- There is an option to use instant replay review of officiating decisions. Division I FBS (formerly Division I-A) schools use replay in virtually all games; replay is rarely used in lower division games. Every play is subject to booth review with coaches only having one challenge. In the NFL, challenges are only automatic in the final two minutes of each half or the entire overtime.
- In the 2006 season, the game clock was started when the ball was declared ready for play after the defensive team (during a scrimmage down) or the receiving kick (during a free kick down) was awarded a first down, reducing the time of games. This rule only lasted one year.
- In the 1984 season, the ball was placed on the 30-yard line (instead of the 20) if a kickoff sailed through the end zone on the fly and untouched. This rule was rescinded after one year.
- Among other rule changes to 2007, kickoffs have been moved from the 35-yard line back five yards to the 30-yard line to match that of the NFL. Some coaches and officials are questioning this rule change as it could lead to more injuries to the players as there will likely be more kickoff returns. The rationale for the rule change was to help reduce dead time in the game. However, the NFL would move its kickoffs back to the 35-yard line for the 2011 season; the NCAA followed suit one year later.
- Since the 2012 college football season, all touchbacks on kickoffs, or free kicks after a safety, have been spotted on the 25-yard line instead of the previous 20-yard spot (which remains the spot for touchbacks in all other game situations). The NFL made this same change effective with its 2018 season. In that same 2018 season, college football (and the NFL come 2023) made a further change to its touchback rule; any fair catch on a kickoff (or free kick following a safety) between the receiving team's goal line and 25-yard line is treated as a touchback, with the receiving team taking possession on its own 25.

== High school football ==
The National Federation of State High School Associations (NFHS) establishes the rules of High School Football. Only Texas uses NCAA playing rules.

With their common ancestry, the NFHS rules of high school football are largely similar to the college game, though with some important differences:

- The four quarters are each 12 minutes, as opposed to 15 minutes in all other forms of the game; this includes Texas (all games).
- Kickoffs take place at the kicking team's 40-yard line, as opposed to the 35 in college and the NFL. This rule is also used by Texas.
- If a ball crosses the plane of the goal line on a missed field goal, it would be a touchback and the opposing team will start at the 20-yard line. In Texas, the ball goes back to the line of scrimmage, except if the line of scrimmage was inside the 20-yard line, in which case, the ball is returned to the 20.
- Any kick crossing the goal line is automatically a touchback; kicks cannot be returned out of the end zone.
- Pass interference by the defense results in a 15-yard penalty, regardless of where the foul occurred (unlike the pro ranks where the ball is placed at the spot of the foul). (Like any other distance penalty, enforcement will not move the ball more than half the distance to the defense's goal line.)
- The defense cannot return an extra-point attempt for a score, except in Texas.
- The use of overtime, and the type of overtime used, is up to the individual state associations. In Texas, two-point conversions are required after touchdown in double overtime; triple overtime & thereafter employs two-point conversions, all like the NCAA.
- Intentional grounding may be called even if the quarterback is outside the tackle box. In Texas, once the quarterback leaves the tackle box, he only needs to throw the ball past the line of scrimmage to avoid this penalty.
- The home team must wear dark-colored jerseys, and the visiting team must wear white jerseys. In the NFL, as well as conference games in the Southeastern Conference, the home team has choice of jersey color. Under general NCAA rules, the home team may wear white with approval of the visiting team.
- NFHS rules specifically prohibit the use of replay review, even if the venue has the facilities to support it. In Texas, the public-school sanctioning body, the University Interscholastic League, only allows replay review in state championship games, while the main body governing non-public schools, the Texas Association of Private and Parochial Schools, follows the NFHS in banning replay review.
- The two-minute warning rule will be used in Texas come 2025. When the play ends and up to two minutes remain in the half or regulation, the clock will stop.

At least one high school rule has been adopted by college football. In 1996, the overtime rules originally utilized by Kansas high school teams were adopted by the NCAA, except with the starting point at the 25-yard line instead of the 10-yard line as prescribed in the NFHS rules, but under NFHS rules, states may opt to start each period from another point (such as the 20 or 25).

=== See also ===
- Six-man football
- Eight-man football
- Nine-man football

== Indoor football ==
Play in all forms of indoor football has tended to emphasize the forward passing game at the expense of rushing the football. Whereas in a typical National Football League game perhaps half of the total offensive plays are rushing plays and 35 or 40 per cent of all of the yardage gained comes from rushing plays, in Arena and other indoor football it is far more common for rushing plays to constitute only 10 per cent of the offense, or even less in some instances.

=== World Series of Pro Football ===
The first documented indoor football games were those played at Madison Square Garden in 1902 and 1903 known as the "World Series of Pro Football." They were the first efforts at a national professional football championship. The games were played on a 70-yard by 35-yard dirt field but otherwise adhered to outdoor rules. Poor attendance led to the tournament being discontinued for 1904. Madison Square Garden had to be redone to accommodate the teams. The wooden flooring of the arena was removed and replaced by an earthen surface. The goal lines were only 70 yards apart and the playing field was only 35 yards wide. (Since was in the era before the forward pass, there were no end zones, as they had not yet been invented.) The earthen surface became sticky as the game progressed and made for some tough maneuvering, while the stands were right up to the playing field and proved to be a physical hazard. The kicking game was also drastically affected. In a game on a normal field, the team with the longest punts had the advantage. However, the Gardens proved to be a dream for a weak punter, due to the field size. Also the arena wall was right on the edge of the field, presenting a serious hazard on any sideline plays. One player knocked himself out of the tournament by running into the wall on the opening kickoff.

=== 1932 NFL Playoff Game in Chicago Stadium ===
The first major indoor football game was the 1932 NFL Playoff Game, which was played indoors in the Chicago Stadium due to a severe blizzard that prevented playing the game outside. A dirt floor was brought in, and to compensate for the 80-yard length of the field, the teams' positions were reset back twenty yards upon crossing midfield.

=== Arena Football League ===
- The Field: An indoor padded surface 85 feet (26 m) wide and 50 yards (46 m) long with 8-yard (7.3 m) endzones. Goal posts are 9 feet (2.7 m) wide with a crossbar height of 15 feet (4.6 m) (NFL goalposts are 18.5 feet (5.6 m) wide with the crossbar at 10 feet (3.0 m)). The goalside rebound nets are 30 feet (9.1 m) wide by 32 feet (9.8 m) high. The bottom of the nets are 8 feet (2.4 m) above the ground. Sideline barriers are 48 inches (1.2 m) high and made of high density foam rubber.
- The Equipment: The official football is the same size and weight as the National Football League ball.
- The Players and Formations: Eight players on the field; 21-man active roster; four-man inactive roster.
- Substitution: Free substitution is allowed, but some players play both ways either by choice or to step in because of injury.
- Formation: Four offensive players must line up on the line of scrimmage. Three defensive players must be down linemen (in a three or four-point stance). Only the "Mac Linebacker" may blitz on either side of the center. Alignment is two or more yards off the line of scrimmage. No stunting or twisting. Offensive motion in the backfield: One receiver may go in a forward motion before the snap.
- Timing: Four 15-minute quarters with a 15-minute halftime (30-minute halftime in ArenaBowl). The clock stops for out-of-bounds plays or incomplete passes only in the last minute of regulation & overtime or when the referee deems it necessary for penalties, injuries or timeouts; as in the NFL, any injury in last minute of regulation or overtime costs that team a timeout, unless they have none and this occurs, when they are granted one. Each team is allowed three time-outs per half, and two per overtime period if regulation ends tied. In the last minute of the game, the clock will run if team has lead and quarterback decides to kneel down. There is a 30-second play clock.
- Movement of the Ball and Scoring: Four downs are allowed to advance the ball ten yards for a first down, or to score. Six points for a touchdown. One point for a conversion by place kick after a touchdown or if safety is scored off any conversion attempt, two points for the following: a conversion by drop kick or for successful run or pass from the 2.5-yard line after a touchdown, three from the 5, or four from the 10. Three points for a field goal or fair catch kick by placement or four points by drop kick. Two points for safeties or defending team's turnover off conversion attempt returned for touchdown. Any kickoff that goes through the uprights is scored as a "deuce" or two points. A "single" or one point is scored when the ball is kicked and receiving team refuses to leave the end zone and is tackled.
- Kicking: Kickoffs are from the goal line. Gunners line up on their 15; offenders & defenders. Kickers may use a one-inch tee. Punting is illegal. On fourth down, a team may go for a first down, touchdown or field goal. The receiving team may field any kickoff or missed field goal that rebounds off the net. Any kickoff untouched which is out of bounds or hitting an overhead structure (i.e. scoreboard) will be placed at the 20-yard line or the place where it went out of bounds, whichever is more advantageous to the receiving team. If a kickoff goes beyond the end zone and stays in bounds (such as kicking it into the field goal "slack net" or if the ball goes under the net), the ball will come out to the 5-yard line. The same is true if a missed field goal attempt goes beyond the end zone and under the net. If the receiving player chooses not to take the ball out of the endzone (takes a knee) or is tackled in the endzone, the ball is placed on the 2.5-yard line and the kicking team scores a single.
- Passing: Passing rules in Arena Football are the same as outdoor NCAA football in which receivers must have one foot inbounds. A unique exception involves the rebound nets. A forward pass that rebounds off of the endzone net is a live ball and is in play until it touches the playing surface.
- Overtime Rules: Overtime periods are 15 minutes during the regular season and the playoffs. In the first overtime each team gets one possession to score. Whoever is ahead after one possession will win. If the teams are tied after each has had a possession, true sudden death rules apply hereafter. Multiple overtime periods will be played in case of a tie and play continues in true sudden death thereafter.
- Coaching challenges: coaches are allowed 2 (two) challenges per game; to do so, coaches throw the red flag before the next play. If the play stands as called after the play is reviewed they lose a timeout; however, if it is reversed they keep their timeouts. If a team wins two straight challenges they are granted a third. All challenges are automatic in the final minute of regulation & all overtime periods, as does scoring plays & turnovers.
- Defending players may not jump offside twice in either half; they risk ejection for rest of half if they do. They cannot jump offside during overtime, or they risk immediate disqualification. This penalty is enforced besides yardage penalty.
- Any player who targets, such as using the helmet to ram opponents, risk immediate disqualification plus a 15-yard penalty.

=== American Indoor Football Association ===
- The AIFA does not use the rebound net found in the Arena Football League.
- One linebacker may move flat to flat but must stay in drop zone.
- Platooning and free substitution is allowed, meaning players do not have to play both offense and defense.
- Franchises must have at least 9 players that originate from within a 120-mile radius of the team's home town.
- The AIFA ball pattern is similar to that of the basketball in the American Basketball Association, with red, white, and blue panels as opposed to the brown colored football of most leagues.

Two rule changes appear to be inspired by Canadian football rules:

- Two offensive players may be in motion at one time. The AFL allows only one in motion.
- The AIFA recognizes the single (also known as an uno or rouge). If a kickoff goes through the uprights, or if the receiving team does not advance the ball out of the end zone on a kickoff, the kicking team is awarded one point and the ball is spotted at the opponent's five-yard line.

=== Continental Indoor Football League ===
Field Size – 50 yards long by 25 yards wide, with end zones a minimum of 5 yards in depth. Fields may vary in size due to physical constraints within facility, with CIFL permission. End zones may be rounded due to hockey board configurations. Padded dasher board walls around the entire field that act as an extension of the ground (only "out of bounds" if contact made by opposing player that forces player into the dasher wall, much like a 'down by contact' rule).

Goal Posts – Goal posts are 12 feet from the floor to the crossbar. The crossbar is 10 feet wide. Anything used to hang the goalpost is considered a part of the upright.

Number Of Players – Seven players per team on the field at one time. Maximum of 20 active players with a 21st player that is only eligible for special-teams plays (kickoffs, field goals, point-after-touchdown plays).

Playing Time – Four 15-minute quarters with a running clock. Clock only stops for incomplete passes and out of bounds plays during the final minute of the halves. 25-second play clock.

Scoring – 6 points for TD, 2 points for run or pass conversion, or drop kick PAT, 1 point for place kick PAT, 2 points for defensive conversion following TD, 2 points for safety. 3 points for a field goal, 4 points for a drop kick field goal.

Backfield in Motion – One player may be in motion in any direction behind the line of scrimmage prior to the snap.

Offensive linemen – Three linemen must be in a three- or four-point stance prior to the snap. They must line up guard, center, guard and next to one another. Any offensive lineman not covered up by the fourth man on the line of scrimmage is an eligible receiver if he is wearing an eligible receiver number (1-49, 80–89).

Defensive linemen – There must be three defensive linemen, and they must line up on the nose, or can line up inside foot-to-outside foot outside of an offensive lineman Linemen must rush inside if nose up or slanted into if shaded, and they must make contact before any movement to the outside is made.

Blitzing – Only one non-lineman can blitz at a time. This player can blitz from any direction, but must be at least five yards off the line of scrimmage/goal line prior to the snap. Players do not have to announce their eligibility to blitz.

Linebackers – At least two defensive players must line up at least 5 yards behind the line of scrimmage. The other two non-linemen must either line up face-to-face with an offensive non-lineman on the line, or be five yards behind the line of scrimmage. After the snap, this rule is eliminated and the players can roam anywhere they wish, provided it does not violate blitzing rules. Linebackers can line up at the goal line if the offense is within five yards of scoring.

Kickoffs – If a kickoff leaves the field of play on the fly, the ball comes out to the 25-yard line. The sideline walls and end zone walls are not out of bounds, and balls can be played off of them. If a kickoff leaves the field of play after making contact with the field or a player on either team, the ball comes out to the 5-yard line, or the point in which it leaves the field of play, whichever is closest to the kicking team's goal line.

Offense – No punting. Offense must attempt to gain a first down or touchdown, or may attempt a field goal (by placement or drop kick).

Coaches – One coach from each team is allowed on the field during game time, but must stay a required distance from the dasher boards.

Overtime – Overtime is played with NCAA-style rules (each team gets one possession), but each possession is started with a kickoff rather than at the 25-yard line. Teams must go for a two-point conversion (by scrimmage play) starting with the third overtime session.

The most notable rule difference in the CIFL from other indoor football leagues is that the CIFL plays seven players to a side, as opposed to most indoor leagues, which play eight men to a side.

The league does not utilize a rebound net, but otherwise, its rules are nearly identical to those of the Arena Football League.

=== United Indoor Football ===
The field is the same width (85 feet) as a standard NHL hockey rink. The field is 50 yards long with up to an 8-yard end zone. (End zones may be a lesser depth with League approval.) Depending on the stadium in which a game is being played, the end zones may be rectangular (like a basketball court) or curved (like a hockey rink). There is a heavily padded wall on each sideline, with the padding placed on top of the hockey dasher boards. The field goal uprights are 9 feet wide, and the crossbar is 18 feet above the playing surface. Unlike Arena football, the ball is not "live" when rebounded off the nets behind the end zone, or their support apparatuses.

A player is counted as out of bounds on the sidelines if they come into contact or fall over the boundary wall.

Each team fields eight players at a time from a 21-man active roster.

==== Substitution rules ====
A substitute may enter the field of play any time the ball is dead. However, a substitute must remain on the field for at least one play. Substitutions are not permitted by rule in any way that shall deceive an opponent. A team that breaks a huddle with more than eight players commits an illegal substitution infraction, for which a 5-yard penalty is immediately assessed. A team that begins a play from scrimmage with more than eight players commits an illegal participation infraction, for which a 10-yard penalty is immediately assessed.

==== Formations ====
The Offensive Box is defined as the area bordered by the outside shoulders of the two Offensive guards, the line of scrimmage, and the distance of five yards behind the line of scrimmage on the offensive side of the ball. Four offensive players must be on the line of scrimmage at the snap, with no more than three of said players in the Offensive Box. The Offensive guards and center must wear numbers that denote they are ineligible to carry the ball nor may they release downfield on pass plays. All players outside the Offensive Box must be at least two yards outside the shoulders of an Offensive guard, and no closer than one yard to another player. No more than two backs (including the Quarterback) may be in the Offensive Box at the snap.

Up to two players may be in motion on the offense prior to the snap. Any man in motion must begin in the box. One offensive player may be moving forward at the time of the snap, but all players in motion must be outside the Offensive Box at the snap. There are special rules that prevent a man in motion from blocking defenders below the waistline. A man in motion is also prevented from blocking defensive linemen or the blitzing linebacker.

The Defensive Box is defined as the area bordered by the outside shoulders of the two Offensive guards, the line of scrimmage, and the distance of five yards beyond the line of scrimmage on the defensive side of the ball. Three defensive players must be in a three- or four-point stance at the start of the snap. One defender serving as a linebacker outside the Defensive Box may raise their hand prior to the snap to signify their intent to rush. Defenders that begin in the Defensive Box must make contact with one of the Offensive linemen before they are allowed to drop back into pass coverage. Defenders that begin outside the Defensive Box may approach the line of scrimmage to align themselves with an offensive player granted they do so at least two yards outside the shoulders of the Offensive guard.

==== Ball movement ====
The ball is kicked off from the goal line. The team with the ball is given four downs to gain ten yards or score. Punting is illegal because of the size of the playing field. A receiver jumping to catch a pass needs to get only one foot down in bounds for the catch to be deemed a completed catch. Balls that bounce off the padded walls that surround the field are live. The defending team may return missed field goal attempts that fall short of the end zone. If a free kick strikes the ceiling or any object hanging from said ceiling, while over the field of play, it is immediately dead, and it belongs to the receiving team 5 yards from mid-field.

==== Scoring ====
The scoring is the same as in the NFL with the addition of a drop kick field goal worth four points during normal play or two points as a post-touchdown conversion. Blocked extra points and turnovers on two-point conversion attempts may be returned by the defensive team for two points. A rouge-kickoff downed in the end zone is worth 1 point to the kicking team; a rogue-kickoff is when the kick returner is caught in his own end zone. A free kick recovered in the end zone by the kicking team is considered a touchdown.

=== Timing ===
A game consists of four 15-minute quarters with a 20-minute halftime intermission. The clock typically only stops for time-outs, penalties, injuries, and official clarifications. Further stoppages occur for incomplete passes and out of bounds during the final 90 seconds of the halves. A mandatory official's time-out, called a promotional timeout, is assessed after the first and fourth quarters and is 90 seconds in duration. Another mandatory official's time-out, called a warning period, is assessed with 90 seconds to play at the end of each half. The game may also be stopped for further promotional time-outs, but must not exceed 90 seconds per league rules.

=== Overtime rules ===
Each team will get a possession from the 25-yard line to try and score. If one team out scores the other on the possession, the game is over. If still tied after an Overtime possession, the procedure is repeated until whoever is up, which wins the game.

=== World Indoor Football League ===
The proposed World Indoor Football League of 1988 proposed that eight players play on offense and seven players play on defense. It was otherwise similar to other indoor football leagues.

== Street football ==
The teams organize each other at the beginning of the game; if there are no pre-selected teams, a draft is held on the spot from the available players. In the event of an odd number of players, one player will usually serve as an "all time quarterback," who plays on offense the whole game and cannot run the ball past the line of scrimmage, or, if more players are on their way, the team who is short handed will automatically draft the newcomer upon arrival.

The two teams organize on opposite sides of the field for the kickoff. Because of skill, field size and other issues, this is usually not a kickoff but rather a punt-off or a throw-off. Many versions skip this process and start the offense at a certain point, similar to a touchback in NFL or other national leagues.

As in regular American football, each team usually has four downs per series. In order to achieve a series of downs, backyard football requires the team with the ball to complete two passes or reach a certain point on the field. Few games include enough people to run a chain crew to maintain the 10 yard familiar in most organized leagues. These structures encourages passing plays over running, as does the usual lack of offensive and defensive lines. Play continues until there is a turnover on downs (i.e. the offensive team fails to complete two passes in four downs), an interception occurs, or the team on offense scores a touchdown. Touchdowns are worth 6, 7, or 1 point(s) depending on the rules set out before the game.

Field goals and extra point kicks are nonexistent (streets and backyards have no goal posts), although punts can frequently happen, usually during "4th and 2 completions" situations where the offensive team cannot earn a first down. (In games played on regulation fields, these kicks can be attempted, but only in certain scoring systems.)

In the event a touchdown is scored, the team on offense will normally stay in the end zone in which they had just scored and the other team will go into the main field and field the subsequent kickoff. Thus, until an interception or turnover on downs, both teams defend and attempt to score on the same end zone.

Rules greatly vary from neighborhood to neighborhood, and are customarily set before each game. There can be a rush on the QB depending on the rules set out before the game. Usually if rushes are allowed, there are 2 rules that are commonly applied; Call rush and blitz count. Call rush is the first rule of rushing the QB in street. This is where the defense calls "Blitz" in a loud voice before the offense hikes the ball, signifying that they will rush, but there is also a counter effect with this. The QB can get out of the pocket and run without having to pass or hand off the ball, also the quarterback can call "shotgun" before or after the other team says "blitz" causing the opposite to have to count to 5 or 10 depending on whether or not they called blitz 5 calling "shotgun" adds 5 seconds to the blitz count. The second, and more common, rush QB rule is Mississippi rush (a blitz count), so called because the blitzing player must insert the word "Mississippi" between numbers so as not to allow the player to count ridiculously fast and effectively give the quarterback no time to throw. Sometimes the two rules are combined, allowing one separate call of "Blitz!" per set of 4 downs. The other option to handle a rush is to use an offensive lineman or center to block any pass rush. A line is rare in street, and the act of a center snapping to a quarterback is completely optional. Most teams that use a line opt for 3 down linemen(1 center and 2 guards). Some organizations that don't require the center to snap the ball to the quarterback only use 2 linemen.

Conversions after a TD usually aren't applied and they can only be attempted from the 6 (or occasionally 7) point TD system, but if they are, there are several conversion systems, including "single point," "pass-run," yardage and "runback." The single-point is the simplest of the rules, in which any successful conversion is worth one point. Pass run is used in some midget leagues and awards 2 points for a pass and one point for a run. Usually all pass-run conversions are attempted from the 1 or 2-yard line. The second conversion system is the yardage system, similar to that used in the XFL playoffs and the proposed New USFL. The yardage system is formatted like this: 1 point conversions are attempted from the 1 or 5-yard line, and 2-point conversions are attempted from the 2 or 10-yard line. The runback is the most rare of the conversion rules, and is most often implemented in one-on-one games. In this version, the play does not end once the ball crosses the goal line; instead, the player with the ball must change direction and advance it all the way back to the other end zone for two points.

The game ends when a pre-determined number of touchdowns or points has been scored, or an arbitrary time is reached (for instance, dusk or the start of school).

Penalties are rare and are usually only enforced in the most egregious cases, such as serious injuries.

== Touch football ==
Depending on the skill of the players, the available playing field, and the purpose of the game, the rules other than the tackling aspect may remain mostly the same or vary considerably from traditional American football. Touch football can be played by teams as few as two or as many as eleven on each side; usually, games consist of teams of four to seven.

Positions in touch football are far less formal than its more organized counterpart. While some games roughly follow conventions, more often, all players will be considered eligible receivers (as in six-man football), and there are usually no running backs. There may or may not be a snapper; if there is not, the quarterback initiates play by hovering the ball above the line of scrimmage and pulling it backward to simulate a snap.

Generally, in touch football, nearly every play is a passing play, whereas run plays and pass plays tend to be well balanced in organized football. Some games will also implement a "blitz count", or a period of time that must elapse after the snap before the defense may cross the line of scrimmage in order to attempt to tackle the quarterback. The count thus gives the quarterback time to complete a pass in the absence of effective blocking (when teams are small, there is often no blocking at all). Other games will not use a count and thus blocking becomes important. Conversely, in the presence of a "blitz count" there is also often a "QB sneak" rule, which prevents the quarterback from taking unfair advantage of the blitz count by preventing the quarterback from crossing the line of scrimmage before the blitz count is finished.

Because of these rules, passing plays are far more common than running plays in touch football.

Along with the size of the teams, the size of the field can vary considerably. In a park, or spring practice situation, a full-sized field may be available, but many games are played in the front and back yards of suburban and rural village neighborhoods, where the whole field may not be much more than ten to thirty yards long. In most of these situations, there are no yard lines, requiring some change in the definition of a first down. Instead of requiring that a team advance the ball ten yards, sometimes two pass completions result in a first down. Another option is to eliminate first downs entirely, so that a team gets four (sometimes five) chances to score.

When it is desired for an odd number of players to play, it is common to allow one player to be an "all-time Quarterback" player; this player will always be on the offense or the kicking team, switching sides throughout the game. When this occurs, there is usually no blitz count and the all-time quarterback is usually never allowed to cross the line of scrimmage.

Another common variation is the elimination of the field goal and extra point kick; this is usually due to the absence of goal posts and tees on the field as well as due to poor kicking skill by the participants. Some games eliminate kicking altogether, directing the teams to start each possession after a touchdown at the twenty-yard line, as if a kickoff and touchback had just occurred; other players prefer to change the kickoff into a "throw-off" or a "punt-off."

Scoring and game timing are much different in touch football than its more organized counterpart. For the sake of simplicity, touchdowns are usually worth 1 point and no other scoring is counted (there are no extra point attempts). In a much lesser used variation, a touchdown is worth 6 points and if the player who scored the touchdown can progress in the other direction from the end zone in which he had just scored back to the opposite end zone without being touched, it counts as a two-point conversion. The former scoring method does not allow for other scoring types such as safeties. There is usually no and the game ends when one opponent has reached 10 touchdowns (in the former convention) or 100 points (in a standard convention).

- Touch football is generally played by amateurs, often teenagers or children.
- In Mexico the "touch football" is also known with the nickname of "tochito", nickname from the name of the game.
- During Thanksgiving, many Americans are known to play in "Turkey Bowls," games of touch or tackle football (without football pads) between family and friends.
- During offseason spring workouts, many high school and college teams play touch football to work on passing formations and plays.

== Women's football ==
=== National Women's Football Association ===
NWFA teams play according to standard National Football League rules with the following notable exceptions:

- TDY-sized football
- only one foot in-bounds is required for a reception
- no blocking below the waist downfield

=== Legends Football League ===
Play style is full-contact. Uniforms consist of helmets, shoulder pads, elbow pads, knee pads, sports bras, and shorts.

There are no kickoffs nor field goals, punts are allowed if inside their own 10-yard line; halves and after scores begin on their own 15-yard line. A team must attempt to get a first down on every fourth down. After a touchdown, a team can attempt a one-point conversion from the one-yard line, or a two-point conversion from the three-yard line. The defending team can run the ball toward their end zone for 2 points off conversion attempts; offending team can get 1 point if safety is scored off conversion attempts.

There are seven women on each side of the 50-yard field, one player less than in arena football. Teams consist of 18 players, of which 12 are active on game day. This means at least 3 or 4 players play both ways, as "iron women". But coaches are allowed free substitution.

The standard offensive formation features 1 quarterback, 2 running backs, 1 center, and 3 wide receivers. The standard defensive formation features 2 defensive linewomen, 2 linebackers, 2 cornerbacks, and 1 safety.

The field is 50-yard between end zones, 30 yards wide, and the end zones are 8 yards deep.

A game consists of four 10-minute periods, separated by a 12-minute halftime (30-minute halftime in championship). In the event of a tie, an 8-minute sudden-death overtime is played; whoever scores first wins it; otherwise, the game ends drawn & teams get a tie (half-victory/half-loss) in standings; however, in postseason, multiple 10-minute overtime periods are played until one team scores, which wins the game. Teams get 2 timeouts per half or overtime period.

Targeting players, such as using the helmet to ram opponents, is prohibited; they risk immediate disqualification plus a 15-yard penalty if they do.

As in the NFL, injuries in last two minutes of half or overtime result in the team using a timeout; if, however the team has no timeouts, and this occurs, they're granted one.

== Canadian football (general) ==
=== The field ===
The Canadian football field, through 2026, is 110 yards (100 m) long and 65 yards (59 m) wide with end zones 20 yards (18 m) deep. At each goal line is a set of 40-foot-high (12 m) goalposts, which consist of two uprights joined by a 18.5-foot-long (5.6 m) crossbar which is 10 feet (3.0 m) above the goal line. The goalposts may be H-shaped (both posts fixed in the ground) although in the higher-calibre competitions the tuning-fork design (supported by a single curved post behind the goal line, so that each post starts 10 feet (3.0 m) above the ground) is preferred. The sides of the field are marked by white sidelines, the goal line is marked in white, and white lines are drawn laterally across the field every 5 yards (4.6 m) from the goal line. (Note: Table of exact conversions: yards / 1 / 5 / 6 1/6 / 10 / 13 1/3 / 15 / 20 / 24 / 25 / 30 / 35 / 40 / 45 / 65 / 110; feet / 3 / 15 / 18 1/2 / 30 / 40 / 45 / 60 / 72 / 75 / 90 / 105 / 120 / 135 / 195 / 330; metres / 0.9144 / 4.572 / 5.6388 / 9.144 / 12.192 / 13.716 / 18.288 / 21.9456 / 22.86 / 27.432 / 32.004 / 36.576 / 41.148 / 59.436 / 100.584)

=== Play of the game ===
Teams advance across the field through the execution of quick, distinct plays, which involve the possession of a brown, prolate spheroid ball with ends tapered to a point. The ball has two one-inch-wide white stripes.

==== Kickoff ====
Play begins with one team place-kicking the ball from its own 35-yard (32 m) line. Both teams then attempt to catch the ball. The player who recovers the ball may run while holding the ball, or throw the ball to a teammate, so long as the throw is not forward.

==== Stoppage of play ====
Play stops when the ball carrier's knee, elbow, or any other body part aside from the feet and hands, is forced to the ground (a tackle); when a touchdown (see below) or a field goal is scored; when the ball leaves the playing area by any means (being carried, thrown, or fumbled out of bounds); or when the ball carrier is in a standing position but can no longer move. If no score has been made, the next play starts from scrimmage.

==== Scrimmage ====
Before scrimmage, an official places the ball at the spot it became dead, but no nearer than 24 yards (22 m) from the sideline or 1-yard (0.91 m) from the goal line. The line parallel to the goal line passing through the ball (line from sideline to sideline for the length of the ball) is referred to as the line of scrimmage. This line is a sort of "no-man's land"; players must stay on their respective sides of this line until the play has begun again. For a scrimmage to be valid the team in possession of the football must have seven players, excluding the quarterback, within one yard of the line of scrimmage. The defending team must stay a yard or more back from the line of scrimmage.

==== Live play ====
On the field at the beginning of a play are two teams of 12 (unlike 11 in American football). The team in possession of the ball is the offence and the team defending is referred to as the defence. Play begins with a backwards pass through the legs (the snap) by a member of the offensive team, to the quarterback or punter. If the quarterback or punter receives the ball, he may then do any of the following:

- run with the ball, attempting to run farther downfield (gaining yardage). The ball-carrier may run in any direction he sees fit (including backwards).
- drop-kick the ball, dropping it onto the ground and kicking it on the bounce. (This play is exceedingly rare in both Canadian and American football, although in the Canadian game it is sometimes used as a last-second "desperation play" if the team is behind by less than three points.)
- pass the ball laterally or backwards to a teammate. This play is known as a lateral, and may come at any time on the play. A pass which has any amount of forward momentum is a forward pass (see below); forward passes are subject to many restrictions which do not apply to laterals.
- hand-off—hand the ball off to a teammate, typically a halfback or the fullback.
- punt the ball; dropping it in the air and kicking it before it touches the ground. When the ball is punted, only opposing players (the receiving team), the kicker, and anyone behind the kicker when he punted the ball are able to touch the ball, or even go within five yards of the ball until it is touched by an eligible player (the No Yards rule, which is applied to all kicking plays).
- place the ball on the ground for a place kick
- throw a forward pass, where the ball is thrown to a receiver located farther downfield (closer to the opponent's goal) than the thrower is. Forward passes are subject to the following restrictions:
  - They must be made from behind the line of scrimmage
  - Only one forward pass may be made on a play
  - The pass must be made in the direction of an eligible receiver.

Each play constitutes a down. The offence must advance the ball at least ten yards towards the opponents' goal line within three downs or forfeit the ball to their opponents. Once ten yards have been gained the offence gains a new set of three downs (rather than the four downs given in American football). Downs do not accumulate. If the offensive team completes 10 yards (9.1 m) on their first play, they lose the other two downs and are granted another set of three. If a team fails to gain ten yards in two downs they usually punt the ball on third down or try to kick a field goal (see below), depending on their position on the field.

==== Change in possession ====
The ball changes possession in the following instances:

- If the offence scores a field goal, the scoring team must kickoff from their own 35-yard (32 m) line.
- If the offence scores a touchdown, the scoring team must kickoff from their own 35-yard (32 m) line. This also applies when the defence scores on a turnover which is returned for a touchdown — technically, they become the offence until the conclusion of the play, and the scoring team must still kickoff.
- If the defence scores on a safety, they have the right to claim possession.
- If one team kicks the ball; the other team has the right to recover the ball and attempt a return. If a kicked ball goes out of bounds, or the kicking team scores a single or field goal as a result of the kick, the other team likewise gets possession.
- If the offence fails to make ten yards in three plays, the defense takes over on downs.
- If the offence attempts a forward pass and it is intercepted by the defense; the defense takes possession immediately (and may try and advance the ball on the play). Note that incomplete forward passes (those which go out of bounds, or which touch the ground without being first cleanly caught by a player) result in the end of the play, and are not returnable by either team.
- If the offence fumbles (a ball carrier drops the football, or has it dislodged by an opponent, or if the intended player fails to catch a lateral pass or a snap from centre, or a kick attempt is blocked by an opponent), the ball may be recovered (and advanced) by either team. If a fumbled ball goes out of bounds, the team whose player last touched it is awarded possession at the spot where it went out of bounds. A fumble by the offence in their own end zone, which goes out of bounds, results in a safety.
- If the offence has committed two consecutive time counts — failed to put the ball in play within 20 seconds of the referee declaring the ball ready for play — on third down in the last three minutes of either half, the referee has the right to give possession to the defence. (This rule does not apply on convert attempts, which are untimed downs.)
- When the first half ends, the team which kicked to start the first half may receive a kickoff to start the second half.

==== Rules of contact ====
There are many rules to contact in this type of football. First, the only player on the field who may be legally tackled is the player currently in possession of the football (the ball carrier). Second, a receiver, that is to say, an offensive player sent down the field to receive a pass, may not be interfered with (have his motion impeded, be blocked, etc.) unless he is within one yard of the line of scrimmage (as opposed to 5 yards (4.6 m) in American football). Any player may block another player's passage, so long as he does not hold or trip the player he intends to block. The kicker may not be contacted after the kick but before his kicking leg returns to the ground (this rule is not enforced upon a player who has blocked a kick), and the quarterback, having already thrown the ball, may not be hit or tackled.

==== Infractions and penalties ====
Infractions of the rules are punished with penalties, typically a loss of yardage of 5, 10 or 15 yards (14 m) against the penalized team. Minor violations such as offside (a player from either side encroaching into scrimmage zone before the play starts) are penalized five yards, more serious penalties (such as holding) are penalized 10 yards (9.1 m), and severe violations (such as face-masking) of the rules are typically penalized 15 yards (14 m). Depending on the penalty, the penalty yardage may be assessed from the original line of scrimmage, the spot the violation occurred, or the place the ball ended after the play. Penalties on the offence may, or may not, result in a loss of down; penalties on the defence may result in a first down being automatically awarded to the offence. For particularly severe conduct, the game official(s) may eject players (ejected players may be substituted for), or in exceptional cases, declare the game over and award victory to one side or the other. Penalties do not affect the yard line which the offence must reach in order to reach first down (unless the penalty results in a first down being awarded); if a penalty against the defence results in the first down yardage being attained, then the offence is awarded a first down.

Penalties may occur before a play starts (such as offsides), during the play (such as holding), or in a dead-ball situation (such as unsportsmanlike conduct).

Penalties never result in a score for the offence (a penalty by the defence committed in their end zone is not ruled a touchdown); on rare occasions, penalties against the offence in their own end zone may result in a safety being scored by the defence. If the penalty yardage, once assessed would move the ball into an end zone (or further than half the distance between the end zone and the spot the penalty is assessed from), a penalty of half-the-distance is assessed instead. Note that in Canadian football (unlike American football), no scrimmage may start inside either one-yard line.

In most cases, the non-penalized team will have the option of declining the penalty; in which case the results of the previous play stand as if the penalty had not been called. One notable exception to this rule is if the kicking team on a 3rd down punt play is penalized before the kick occurs; the receiving team may not decline the penalty and take over on downs. (After the kick is made, change of possession occurs and subsequent penalties are assessed against either the spot where the ball is caught, or the runback).

==== Kicking ====
Canadian football distinguishes three ways of kicking the ball:

Place kick
Kicking a ball held on the ground by a teammate, or, on a kickoff (resuming play following a score), placed on a tee.
Drop kick
Kicking a ball after bouncing it on the ground. Although rarely used today, it has the same status in scoring as a place kick. This play is part of the game's rugby heritage, and was largely made obsolete when the ball with pointed ends was adapted. Unlike the American game, Canadian rules allow a drop kick to be attempted at any time by any player, but the move is very rare.
Punt
Kicking the ball after it has been released from the kicker's hand and before it hits the ground. Punts may not score a field goal, even if one should travel through the uprights. As with drop kicks, players may punt at any time.

On punts and field goal attempts (but not kickoffs), members of the kicking team, other than the kicker and any teammates who are onside (behind the kicker at the time of the kick), may not approach within five yards of the ball until it has been touched by the receiving team.

==== Scoring ====
The methods of scoring are:

Touchdown
Achieved when the ball is in possession of a player in the opponent's goal area, or when the ball in the possession of a player crosses or touches the plane of the opponent's goal-line, worth 6 points (5 points until 1956). A touchdown in Canadian football is often referred to as a "major score" or simply a "major."
Conversion (or Convert)
After a touchdown, the team that scored attempts one scrimmage play from any point between the hash marks on or outside the opponents' 5-yard (4.6 m) line. If they make what would normally be a field goal, they score one point; what would normally be a touchdown scores two points (a "two-point conversion"). No matter what happens on the convert attempt, play then continues with a kickoff (see below).
Field goal
Scored by a drop kick or place kick (except on a kickoff) when the ball, after being kicked and without again touching the ground, goes over the cross bar and between the goal posts (or between lines extended from the top of the goal posts) of the opponent's goal, worth three points.
Safety
Scored when the ball becomes dead in the possession of a team in its own goal area, or when the ball touches or crosses the dead-line, or side-line-in-goal and touches the ground, a player, or some object beyond these lines as a result of the team scored against making a play. It is worth two points. This is different from a single (see below) in that the team scored against begins with possession of the ball. The most common safety is on a third down punt from the end zone, in which the kicker decides not to punt and keeps the ball in his team's own goal area. The ball is then turned over to the receiving team (who gained the two points), and they begin their first down possession play from their own 35-yard (32 m) line on their side of the field.
Single
Scored when the ball becomes dead in the possession of a team in its own goal area, or when the ball touches or crosses the dead-line, or side-line-in-goal, and touches the ground, a player, or some object beyond these lines as a result of the ball having been kicked from the field of play into the goal area by the scoring team. It is worth one point. This is different from a safety (see above) in that team scored against receives possession of the ball after the score.
Officially, the single is called a rouge (French for "red") but is often referred to as a single. The exact derivation of the term is unknown but it has been thought that in early Canadian football, the scoring of a single was signaled with a red flag.

==== Resumption of play ====
Resumption of play following a score is conducted under procedures which vary with the type of score.

- Following a touchdown and convert attempt (successful or not), play resumes with the scoring team kicking off from its own 35-yard (32 m) line (45-yard line in amateur leagues).
- Following a field goal, the non-scoring team may choose for play to resume either with a kickoff as above, or by scrimmaging the ball from its own 35-yard (32 m) line.
- Following a safety, the scoring team may choose for play to resume in either of the above ways, or it may choose to kick off from its own 35-yard (32 m) line.
- Following a single or rouge, play resumes with the non-scoring team scrimmaging from its own 35-yard (32 m) line, unless the single is awarded on a missed field goal, in which case the non-scoring team scrimmages from either the 35-yard (32 m) line or the yard line from which the field goal was attempted, whichever is greater.

==== Game timing ====
The game consists of two 30-minute halves, each of which is divided into two 15-minute quarters. The clock counts down from 15:00 in each quarter. Timing rules change when there are three minutes remaining in a half. A 2-minute interval occurs after the end of each quarter (15 minutes at halftime, except 30 minutes in Grey Cup), and the two teams then change goals.

In the first 27 minutes of a half, the clock stops when:

- points are scored,
- the ball goes out of bounds,
- a forward pass is incomplete,
- the ball is dead and a penalty flag has been thrown,
- the ball is dead and teams are making substitutions (e.g., possession has changed, punting situation, short yardage situation),
- the ball is dead and a player is injured, or
- the ball is dead and a captain calls a time-out.

The clock starts again when the referee determines the ball is ready for scrimmage, except for team time-outs (where the clock starts at the snap), after a time count foul (at the snap) and kickoffs (where the clock starts not at the kick but when the ball is first touched after the kick).

In the last three minutes of a half, the clock stops whenever the ball becomes dead. On kickoffs, the clock starts when the ball is first touched after the kick. On scrimmages, when it starts depends on what ended the previous play. The clock starts when the ball is ready for scrimmage except that it starts on the snap when on the previous play

- the ball was kicked off,
- the ball was punted,
- the ball changed possession,
- the ball went out of bounds,
- there were points scored,
- there was an incomplete forward pass,
- there was a penalty applied (not declined), or
- there was a team time-out.

The clock does not run during convert attempts in the last three minutes of a half. If the 15 minutes of a quarter expire while the ball is live, the quarter is extended until the ball becomes dead. If a quarter's time expires while the ball is dead, the quarter is extended for one more scrimmage. A quarter cannot end while a penalty is pending: after the penalty yardage is applied, the quarter is extended one scrimmage. Note that the non-penalized team has the option to decline any penalty it considers disadvantageous, so a losing team cannot indefinitely prolong a game by repeatedly committing penalties.

In the event of a tie after regulation, teams get one possession from the opponents' 35-yard line. The overtime is untimed. Coin toss determines whether team receives first or defend; the teams turn about for the next overtime possession, if needed. Whoever is ahead after one possession wins it and two points in standings; if after two possessions in the regular season or preseason, a tie still persists, the game ends drawn, and one point in standings; however, in postseason, multiple overtime possessions are repeated until whoever is up, which wins the game. If a touchdown has been scored they must make a two-point conversion, unless they score enough beat their opponents.
