= John Holland (pen maker) =

American businessman and industrialist (1838–1917)

- Born: August 25, 1838; Kilcrohane, County Cork, Ireland
- Died: 1917 (aged 78–79)
- Occupation: Businessman

John Holland (August 25, 1838 – 1917) was an American businessman and industrialist whose eponymous company, John Holland Gold Pen Company, was a large maker of pens and related products during the late 19th century. In his business activities, he made several metallurgical and mechanical advancements, the most notable being a process for creating stable bars and other usable forms of iridium.

== Early years ==
He was born on August 25, 1838, in Kilcrohane, County Cork, Ireland, and emigrated, with his parents, to the United States in 1848. The family settled in Cincinnati, Ohio, where he stayed for the rest of his life. He served an apprenticeship, then worked for the pen maker George W. Sheppard. In 1862, he acquired the entire business and quickly expanded it.

== Success ==
Before 1900, the John Holland Pen Company was a major fountain pens manufacturer. George S. Parker, founder of the most famous brand at the time, was a reseller. In 1880, Holland discovered the ability to melt and make castings of iridium by fusing the white-hot ore with phosphorus, and patented the process in the United States. He invoked the help of William Lofland Dudley in getting rid of the phosphorus, who did so by repeated applications of lime at great heat. This is the first reported method of refining iridium. Dudley then found new applications for iridium, and formed the American Iridium Company with Holland.

== Death and decline ==
After John Holland's death in 1917 the company started to decline, and was closed around 1950.
