= Jarrod Dicker =

American writer and entrepreneur (born 1985)

Jarrod Dicker (born March 9, 1985) is a writer, entrepreneur and technology executive. He is currently the chief executive officer of Po.et, a decentralized media technology company. Dicker is credited with bringing blockchain technology to the media and advertising space. He formerly led innovation at the Washington Post, and held similar roles at RebelMouse, Time Inc. and the Huffington Post.

== Early life and education ==
Dicker earned a BA from Rutgers University, majoring in English Literature. At Rutgers, he wrote for the school paper, The Daily Targum.

== Career ==
=== Writing ===
In 2009, Dicker served as the deputy editor of Stay Thirsty Media, an online music magazine. There he interviewed over 100 artists, including Dave Davies of the Kinks, Bill Ward of Black Sabbath, Greg Ginn of Black Flag and more.

Dicker also wrote for Relix Magazine, Jambase.com and Jambands.com.

=== The Washington Post ===
Dicker joined the Washington Post in 2013 to lead their innovation unit and founded their research and development team, RED. There he was credited with turning around the Washington Post's advertising and technology business.

=== Po.et ===
On February 13, 2018, and Axios scooped that Dicker was leaving the Washington Post to become CEO of blockchain company, Po.et. Following the announcement, Dicker wrote a post Dicker, Jarrod (2018-02-13). "The Next Platform for Media and Makers". Medium. on Medium explaining that Po.et is a shared, open-source universal ledger designed to track ownership, attribution and the marketplace flow of the world's creative assets through a never-before-imagined chain of value. As described in Columbia Journalism Review, "lots of people in media pay attention when Dicker calls something interesting, and so many heads turned when he said he was leaving the Post for a blockchain startup called Po.et." Many have covered the evolution of Po.et, citing how blockchain can change digital publishing for the better.

== Accolades ==
In 2013, Business Insider named Dicker one of the most creative people in social media marketing

In 2017, Business Insider named Dicker and the RED team the most interesting ad-tech upstarts of 2017
