= Hans Decker =

German sculptor

Hans Decker was a German sculptor of the middle of the fifteenth century. His home was in Nuremberg, but otherwise very little is recorded concerning him.

His name is mentioned in a register for the year 1449, and certain early productions in the years 1432 and 1437 are attributed to him. Though his carving in stone is rather rough, he stands alone among his contemporaries for his energy and realism.

== Works ==
His principal sculptures are the colossal statue of St. Christopher with the Child Christ on his shoulder, at the south-west portal of the church of St. Sebald, a memorial of the Schlüsselfeld family, and the great "Entombment", dated 1446, in the chapel of St. Wolfgang, in the church of St. Egidius. The group is composed of eight figures of heroic proportions powerfully disposed. In the body of Christ the handling is hard, but there is a distinct attempt at correct anatomy. The head is noble and manly; Mary is full of grief; John raises his Master's arm to kiss it. The draperies are simple and finely arranged.

This work is full of the new naturalistic tendency.
