= Dicker-rod =

Measuring device for use during games of gridiron football

A sideline official holding a dicker-rod during the 1974 World Football League season; running with the football is quarterback Dave Mays

The dicker-rod (also spelled dickerod) is a device intended to replace the first down chains commonly used to measure 10-yard distances during games of gridiron football. The device was named for its inventor, George Dicker (1913–1989) of Tustin, California, and received a patent in 1973. The dicker-rod also aims to improve safety, as a 10-yard length of chain laying along the sideline can be a hazard for players. Additionally, it requires just one person to operate, rather than a three-person chain crew. However, the dicker-rod has not been widely used, and the first-down chain remains the standard.

== Description ==
The device features a rod approximately 3 yards (9.0 ft; 2.7 m) in length. (Note: The design will function as intended provided the length of the rod is at least half the distance between established yard markers. As football fields usually are marked with lines that completely cross the playing area every five yards, 2 1/2 yards is the minimum usable length of the rod.) Initially, the rod is positioned horizontally by its operator, and a marker attached to the rod is positioned to indicate the ball's position from the nearest five-yard marker (that is, the 5, 10, 15, 20, etc. yard lines). For example, if a set of downs begins on the 23-yard line, the marker is placed two yards along the rod, referenced from the 25-yard line. The operator then moves to the applicable yard marker 10 yards downfield, for example (assuming the offense is moving towards midfield) to the 35-yard line. The marker on the rod then indicates the line to gain, in this example the 33-yard line, two yards away from the 35-yard line and 10 yards from the ball's starting position. Having located the line to gain, the operator can then hold the rod vertically at that location, as a visual aid to players, officials, and spectators. If the offense moves the ball near the line to gain and a measurement is required, the operator can bring the device onto the field and reposition it to the horizontal position to assess if the football has or has not reached the marker, which represents the line to gain. The patent provides additional detail about the mechanics of the device; for example, how the marker is held in position on the rod.

== Usage ==
The first official use of the dicker-rod was in a 1970 college football contest between UC Santa Barbara and Cal State Long Beach. An August 1972 newspaper article about its inventor noted that the dicker-rod was used in 174 high-school football games during the 1971 season, and in the June 1972 Coaches All-America Game.

The dicker-rod was used by the World Football League (WFL) throughout its 1974 season. The league reverted to using a traditional chain for its 1975 season.
