= Quick kick =

Punt in gridiron football

In gridiron football, a quick kick is any punt made under conditions in which the opposing team would not expect a punt. Typically this has been a kick from scrimmage from a formation that is, or resembles, one usually used other than for punting, or at least not resembling the one usually used for punting. Typically it will also be on some down before last down (last down being third in Canadian, and, since 1912, fourth in American football), unless done from a formation usually used for place kicking.

== Purpose ==
The purpose of a quick kick is the same as that for all punting, but with the additional plan of:

- preventing a runback (return) of the ball by the opponent
- additional distance by the ball's bouncing or rolling instead of being fielded by an opponent
- (when legal) recovery and retained possession of the ball by the kicking team
- scoring (and preventing the scoring of) a single point in Canadian football

== Disadvantages ==
The disadvantages (required for the punt to be unexpected) are one or more of these:

- earlier sacrifice of possession of the ball, or sacrifice of a kick at goal (field goal)
- greater exposure to the kick being blocked by an opponent, or inadvertently by a teammate
- sacrificing distance or accuracy by need of being done quickly
- being done by someone other than the team's best punter

== Occurrence ==
Factors that make a quick kick more likely:

- the play being in a team's repertoire
- long distance to go for a new first down
- the other team not showing anticipation of a quick kick, as by dropping a safety player far back
- being close to one's own goal line
- being close enough to the other team's goal line that a field goal attempt is credible, but far enough that its success is not likely
- current or historic rules allowing for the kicking team to recover and retain possession of the ball; see onside kick
- the team having a player good at both punting and other backfield roles
- the team not having a good specialist at punting
- conditions that make long drives (moving the ball in continuous team possession) unlikely
- a strong wind blowing either with or against the team; a headwind would encourage a low kick which, if expected, would get quickly to the other team for a runback; a tailwind could allow an unfielded kick much extra distance
- hard playing surface, allowing extra distance via bounce
- the punter-to-be's lining up a yard or so deeper in formation than that backs usual position, (sometimes concealed by other backs lining up deeper too) or going in motion by backpedaling
- fashion in the circuit in which the game is played

If a team uses the quick kick a lot, surprise can be maintained only by their also having a fake quick kick play. One type of such play is the equivalent of the Statue of Liberty play for the forward pass: the ostensible punter holds the ball out as if to drop it, then hands it to a teammate stepping behind or in front of him.

A quick kick is usually done from closer to the line of scrimmage than an ordinary punt. For approximately the decade of the 1910s in American football, the rules discouraged the quick kick by requiring that the ball be kicked from at least five yards behind the line of scrimmage. Because of the closeness of the opposing team, the approach the kicker uses before dropping the ball for a quick kick is often designed to decrease the distance forward that the punter will step, or to reduce the time of the approach. One such technique is the "rocker step", in which the punter first steps backward and then rocks forward. Another is to take a somewhat sideways approach, leaning and kicking somewhat "across the body"; for a right-footed kicker this means approaching toward the right while leaning left.

A quick kick made relatively close to the opposing goal line is often executed by a technique called a "pooch punt", which is a more controlled kick. A typical last down punt or a punt taken as a free kick is done with the emphasis mostly on maximizing distance.

== Frequency ==
Quick kicks are relatively rare in American football, but they have never completely disappeared. Notable quick kicks in college football include one performed by Tate Forcier of the University of Michigan against the University of Notre Dame on September 12, 2009, and a 54-yard punt by Kellen Moore of Boise State University against Louisiana Tech on October 26, 2010.

In the NFL, quarterback Randall Cunningham, a prominent college punter, made 20 quick kicks during his career. Ben Roethlisberger has five quick kicks for a career net average of 24.2 yards per kick, two of which went for touchbacks. New England Patriots quarterback Tom Brady performed a quick kick punt on a third and ten against the Denver Broncos in the divisional round of the AFC playoffs, on January 14, 2012.

Quick kicks were a much more frequent occurrence in the original XFL during its lone season in 2001. This was because the XFL permitted kicking teams to recover and advance their own punts provided they travelled a minimum of 25 yards. XFL teams usually attempted quick kicks in third and long situations.
