= Jean-Jacques Dicker =

Swiss-French-American photographer

- Born: June 27, 1944 (age 81); Geneva, Switzerland
- Occupation: Photographer
- Known for: Empty Rooms; Africa

Jean-Jacques Dicker (born June 27, 1944 in Geneva, Switzerland) is a Swiss-French-American photographer, best known for his documentary photography of Africa and Southeast Asia and fine art photography including portraits and nudes.

== Background ==
Jean-Jacques Dicker was born in Geneva, Switzerland. He is the grandson of the actors Georges Pitoëff and Ludmilla Pitoëff. He traveled through Africa during three years in 1977 and 1978, and then again in 1984, to document many aspects of life in remote villages, including the inner life of prostitutes throughout the continent.

== Awards ==
- Nikon Photo Contest International 1973: Black and White Division (Third Prize). Tokyo, Japan
- Nikon Photo Contest International 1974: Black and White Division (Third Prize). Tokyo, Japan
- Bourse Fédérale des Arts Appliqués, (1974 and 1980) Berne, Switzerland.

== Books and articles ==
Jean-Jacques Dicker's work has been published in two books: Africa, and Empty Rooms and other journals and magazines. Among them: The International Journal for transpersonal studies, and the Honolulu StarBulletin.
