= Lindsey Decker =

American artist

Lindsey Decker (1923–1994) was an American artist who was born in Lincoln, Nebraska.

Decker's work was included in the 1966 exhibition Eccentric Abstraction held at the Fischbach Gallery in New York City. Works by the artist can be found in the collections of the National Gallery of Art in Washington, DC, the Whitney Museum of American Art and the Detroit Institute of Arts.
