= Cora Decker Sargent =

American composer

Cora Emily Decker Sargent (21 May 1868 - 27 September 1944) was an American composer who is best remembered for her song “A Summer Girl,” which was performed at the Proms (today the BBC Proms) concert series in England on 28 September 1900.

Decker was born in Kankakee, Illinois, to Katharine Ellsworth Worden and Westbrook Schoonmaker Decker. Her father was a judge. Little is known about Decker’s education. She married George W. Sargent in 1888 and they had one son. The couple was listed in the 1919 Social Register of Minneapolis. Decker died in Chicago in 1944.

Decker’s music was published by G. Schirmer, Inc. Her works for voice and piano included:

- “A Summer Girl” (text by Samuel Minturn Peck)
- “Spanish Song” (text by Samuel Minturn Peck)
