= John Decker (fire chief) =

American politician

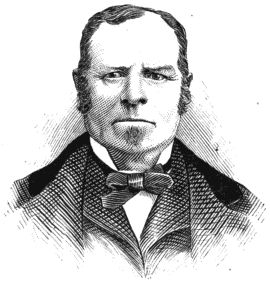
- John Decker, 1885
- Born: May 15, 1823; New York City, United States
- Died: November 18, 1892 (aged 69); Staten Island, New York, US
- Resting place: New Springville Presbyterian Cemetery
- Occupations: Firefighter, politician, oysterman
- Known for: Last fire chief of the Old New York City Volunteer Fire Department.
- Spouse: Mary Margaret Barton
- Children: 3

John Decker (May 15, 1823 – November 18, 1892) was an American businessman, politician and firefighter. He served as the last Chief Engineer of the old New York City Fire Department, the original colonial-era volunteer firefighters of New York City, from 1860 until 1865. He led the fire department during the New York Draft Riots, for which he gained national attention, and later founded the Volunteer Fireman's Association.

== Biography ==
=== Early life and career ===
John Decker was born in the Third Ward of New York City on May 15, 1823. His father, David Decker, was a prominent businessman and oyster dealer in the city. Educated in a public school on Fulton Street, Decker served as a ships cook on a trading vessel for a year when he was 15 years old. Upon returning to New York, he worked with his father throughout his childhood. He eventually opened a wholesale oyster business himself, located on Ann Street, and eventually became the leading oyster merchant in New York for several years and had large financial interests in oyster growing during his later life.

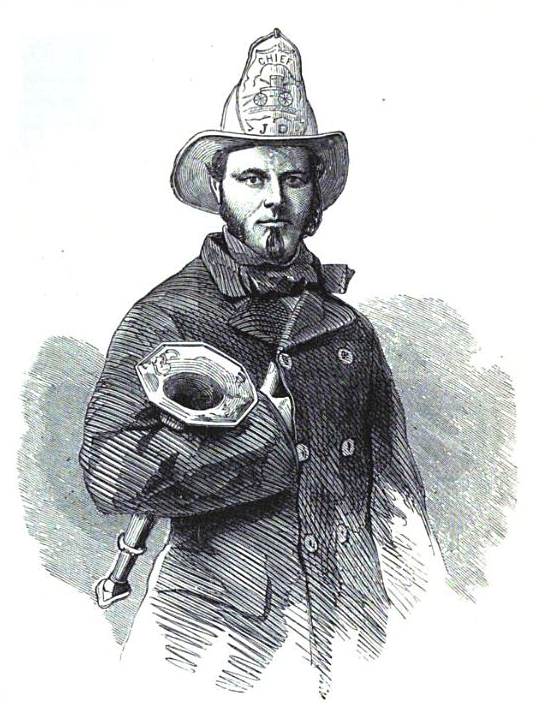
John Decker in 1863.

At age 17, Decker began working with Engine Company No. 14 of the old volunteer fire department and, when he became of age, officially joined the department in October 1844. That same year, he became married to Mary Margaret Barton with whom he had three children. Two of these died in infancy while a third, their son, drowned while attending school at Norwalk, Connecticut.

In 1847, he was made an assistant foreman of the company, serving three consecutive terms, elected foreman in 1850 and assistant engineer two years later. He was elected Chief Engineer in 1860 and re-elected in 1863. During his time as chief engineer, he was responsible for establishing the First Fire Zouaves and, when the Second Regiment of Zouaves was organized, he maintained them out of his own finances and later became its first colonel.

=== New York Draft Riots ===
During the New York Draft Riots, Decker commanded the fire department, coordinating its operations throughout Manhattan. He was present at Third Avenue and 47th Street, on Monday, July 13, 1863, when the draft protests turned violent outside the Ninth District Provost Marshal's office. The volunteer firemen of Engine Company No. 33 (called "Black Joke," after an 1812 warship) halted the draft selection by smashing the window of the office and breaking the rotating lottery bin. When a gathering mob set the office on fire, Decker and Black Joke foreman Peter Masterson (a sometime city alderman and state representative) cleared a passage through the mob and enabled the Black Joke to put out the blaze before it burned down neighboring tenements.

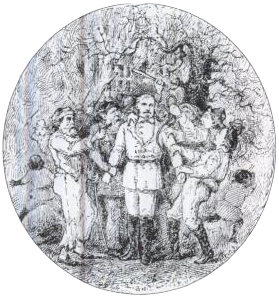
John Decker being threatened by a mob during the New York Draft Riots

That evening, Decker confronted the mob looting the Colored Orphan Asylum. Decker arrived almost immediately after the orphanage was set on fire and did everything he could to prevent it. Despite having no police protection, Decker and his men made several attempts to break through the rioters. The rioters far outnumbered the firefighters and were turned back. A second attempt was made in three different parts of the building, Decker succeeding in confusing the rioters. The mob became angered at Decker for his repeated attempts to interfere and threatened his life if he tried another attempt to put out the fire. With this, Decker went up to the steps of the building and spoke to the 2,000 rioters and "declared it would be disgraceful to humanity and to the City of New-York to destroy a building whose only purpose was benevolence, and which had for its object nothing but good."

The half-drunken mob ignored Decker and set fire to the building once more. When Decker and his men put out the fire, which had been set in different parts of the building, the mob rushed towards Decker with the intention of killing him. Decker's life was saved only when his men, who quickly surrounded Decker, told the crowd that their fire chief would not be taken "except over their dead bodies." He and 15 of his men were eventually forced from the building and thrown out into the street where they once again stood by to watch the orphanage burn down.

Decker was on duty throughout the five-day period and, at one point, narrowly escaped from being lynched. Moments before he was to be hanged, Decker told his attackers that they might "stop his draft, but could not stop the government drafts." He was rescued at the last moment by his men. The New York Times later described Decker as having "showed himself one of the bravest of the brave."

=== Retirement and political career ===
Upon the reorganization of the fire department in June 1865, which effectively replaced the old volunteer firefighter service with the modern New York City Fire Department, he was legislated out of office. Although the city attempted to retain Decker as the working head of the new organization, Decker declined declaring that if the Commissioner proposed to superintend the work of the firefighters at the fires, there would be, with himself, five Captains, "enough to sink any ship". No one was appointed in his place as a result and, on the night of August 31, 1865, Decker locked the doors of his office for the last time and went home. His last fire was that same day at a stable on Mulberry Street, in the rear of the canal.

Decker moved to Staten Island in 1867 and later relocated to Port Richmond where he became involved in real estate. Entering local politics, he represented Richmond County in the state assembly, receiving 2,336 votes and winning the majority vote, and later held a position at Castle Garden. He was also a member of the committee on State Prisons, the Sub-Committee of the Whole, and was regarded as a popular state representative.

At the 100th anniversary of the British evacuation of New York in 1883, Decker reorganized the surviving members of the old volunteers and assigned them a place in one of the divisions of the Centennial parade. Shortly thereafter, he founded the Volunteer Fireman's Association and served as its first president. Under his energetic leadership, the organization was established as one of the most prominent institutions in the city.

=== Death ===
On May 17, 1892, Decker developed symptoms related to blood poisoning in his leg and was confined to his Vreeland Street home. He last left his residence, walking two blocks to the nearest polling station with the aid of a cane and crutch, to vote for Grover Cleveland in the presidential election of 1892. In early-November, Decker contracted a heavy cold which soon turned into pneumonia. He died less than a week later at his home on the afternoon of November 18, 1892. At the time of his death, his brother, four sisters and other relatives were present. His funeral was held at his home the following week, organized by the Volunteer and Exempt Fireman's Associations, and was buried at the Presbyterian Cemetery at New Springville.

Decker was portrayed in the 2006 historical novel The Volunteers: A Historical Novel of New York City's Firemen, 1830-1865 by Donald L. Collins.
