= John Dicker =

English cricketer

John Dicker (30 March 1815 – 30 March 1895) was an English cricketer who played for Kent.

Dicker was born in Cudham in Kent in 1815, the son of William and Sophia Dicker. His father was a miller at Hever. Dicker himself worked as a carpenter, wood turner and as a cricket bat maker, initially at Hever and then at Edenbridge.

Dicker played for a variety of local cricket teams, including for Westerham and Penshurst. He was one of the first players to employ roundarm bowling regularly. He played in three important matches, two for Kent in 1840 and one in 1844 in a Married v Single game. This was a benefit match for the players involved in it.

Dicker married Susannah Dicker from Sussex in 1842. He died at Westerham in 1895 on his eightieth birthday.

== Bibliography ==
- Carlaw, Derek (2020). Kent County Cricketers, A to Z: Part One (1806–1914) (PDF). Cardiff: ACS.
