= Chain crew =

Crew that manages signal poles in gridiron football

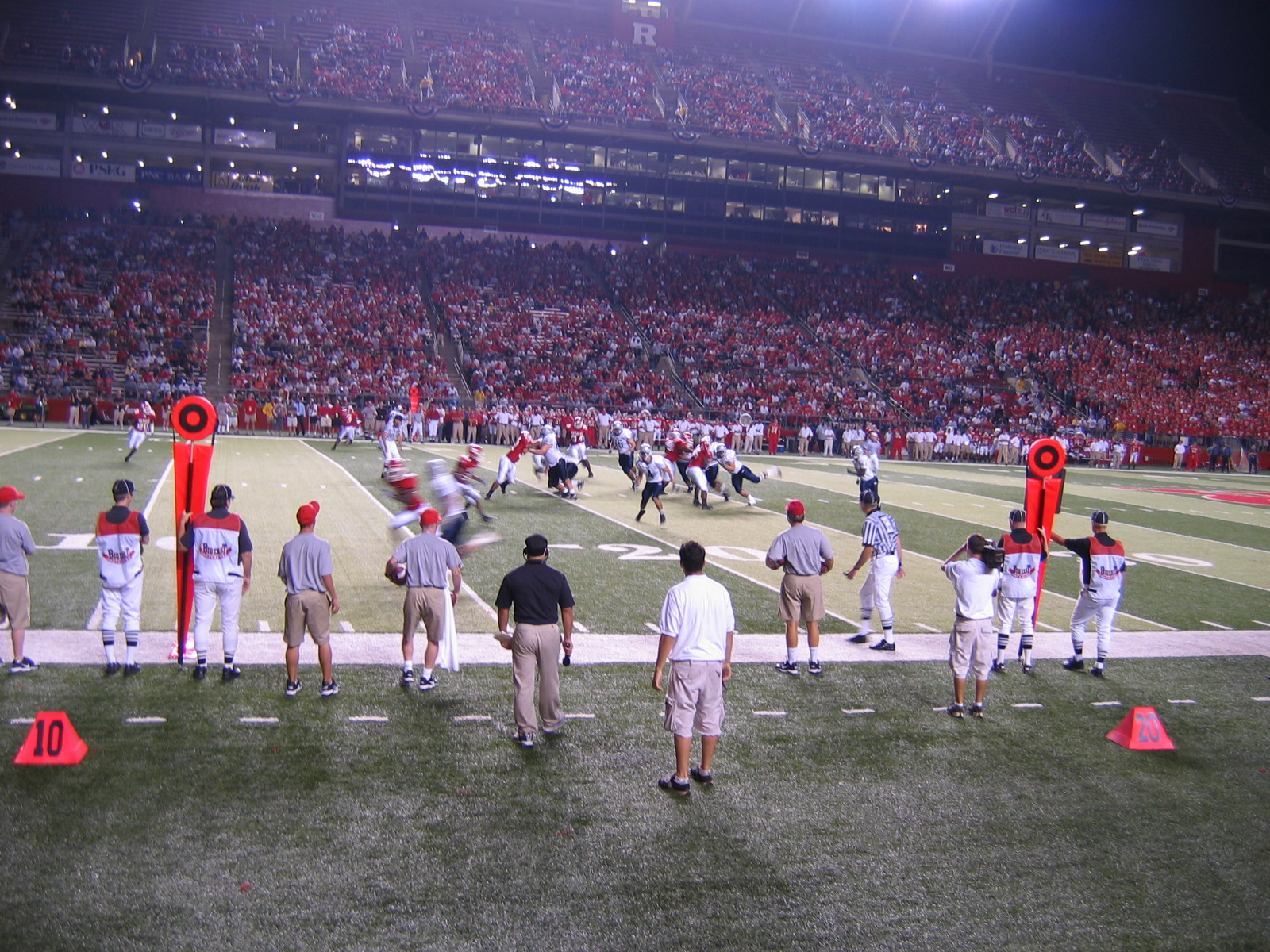
The chain gang

In gridiron football, the chain crew (commonly known as the "chain gang") is a crew that manages signal poles on one of the sidelines. There are three primary signal poles: the "rear rod" that marks the beginning of the current set of downs, the "forward rod" that marks the line to gain, and the "box" that marks the line of scrimmage. The two rods are attached at the bottom by a chain exactly ten yards long, while the "box" displays the current down number.

The chain crew, under the direction of the head linesman/down judge, signals the officials' decisions; it does not make decisions. Players look to the chain crew to see the line of scrimmage, the down number, and the line to gain. Officials may rely on the chain crew after a play (incomplete pass or penalty) whose outcome depends on the original spot of the ball. This also includes bringing the chains onto the field whenever an accurate measurement is needed to determine if a first down has been made.

== Members ==
Three members of the chain crew hold poles upright. The bottom of each pole is placed along a sideline to denote a line across the gridiron to the opposite sideline.

1. A "rod man" holds the "rear rod" that marks the beginning of the current set of downs.
2. Another "rod man" holds the "forward rod" ten yards toward the defense's goal-line from the rear rod. This marker indicates the line to gain, which the offense must reach in their series of four downs in order to retain possession of the ball. The two rods (sometimes known as "sticks") are attached at the bottom by a chain exactly ten yards long. The chain is always taut so that the rods are ten yards apart.
3. The "box man" holds a pole that marks the line of scrimmage and displays the number of the current down.

There may be additional chain crew members. A "clip man" is discussed below. In the NFL and college football, additional chain crew members have additional tasks, such as to relieve the line judge of the clerical task of recording all assessed penalties. Despite the use of "man" in the colloquial terms for the chain crew positions, women can perform any of them.

Members of the chain crew are usually picked by the offices of the home team instead of the league or conference. At the college and professional level, the chain crew are usually experienced local football officials. High school teams may use certified officials but more commonly, parent volunteers or school faculty/staffers run the chains. In the NFL, members of the chain crew must have credentials entitling them to access to the field, and must wear white shirts plus standard officiating hats and pants. The home team pays them; some teams pay an hourly wage and others pay a flat rate to work a game.

The chain crew does not wear protective gear as players do. A routine instruction by officials to the chain crew is to withdraw or drop their signals, and move back, if the play comes toward them so as to endanger them. Often, the signals use bright orange color, are padded, and have break-away components for safety.

== Location ==
For games at all levels except the NFL, the chain crew operates on the side of the field opposite the press box (usually the visiting team's sideline).

In the NFL, the chain crew switches sides at halftime; the referee determines their initial placement. (Note: In NFL games where both teams' benches were on the same side of the field (a practice that has not occurred since the 1994 season), the NFL specified that the chain crew operate on the opposite side for the entire game.)

In the NCAA, the chains are located opposite the press box for the entire game. In the first half, the line judge is located opposite the press box and supervises the chain crew, with the head linesman on the press box side of the field. In the second half, the head linesman and line judge swap sides of the field like in the NFL, with the linesman supervising the chain crew. This practice started in 2014.

In the NFL and other venues where there is a zone behind the sidelines, all three poles are placed somewhere along the back line of this zone. Otherwise, the poles are placed along the sideline.

=== Auxiliary chain crew ===
For professional and college football games, an auxiliary chain crew operates on the opposite side of the field, supervised by the line judge. Their presence lets players and officials look to either side of the field for information.

The auxiliary chain crew also includes a member holding the drive start indicator, which is placed at the beginning of a team's drive and stays there until the team loses possession. This indicator is only used for statistical purposes to calculate the distance of each drive. It looks similar to a "stick" and has an arrow (or occasionally a large "X") that points in the direction the offensive team is going. The NFL eliminated the drive start indicator in 2018.

== Operations ==
At the start of a series of downs, the linesman stands so that the heel of one foot marks the initial line of scrimmage. The box man places his indicator to mark this position and sets the box to display "1". The operator of the rear rod marks the same position, while the other rod man moves ten yards toward the defense's goal line to mark the line to gain.

The linesman, the box man, or a fourth member of the chain crew attaches a "clip" to the chain to line up with the rear edge of the closest five-yard line to the rear rod. A device on the clip indicates which numbered line this is. The clip and the device let the chain crew restore the position of the rods after a mishap. Using multiple clips lets the clip man mark the new position quickly and remove the old clip afterward. In leagues such as the NFL with Instant Replay, the old clip remains on the chain until the chain crew is sure the previous play will not be reviewed and reversed.

After a typical play, the box man increments the displayed number and realigns that pole to the new line of scrimmage, again as directed by the linesman. After a play that results in a first down, all three members move and reset their signals to mark a new series of downs.

The chain crew must not move until the referee or linesman signals whether the play finished without a penalty. On a penalty, the chain crew stays put so that the officials can see the original state. When the referee and linesman walk off the appropriate number of yards, the box man moves as well. The box man does not change the number displayed, except on a penalty that results in a loss of down. On a penalty that results in a first down, the entire chain crew moves and resets.

When possession of the ball switches to the other team, the forward rod becomes the rear rod and vice versa to minimize the distance the rod men have to move. However, at the end of the first and third quarters, when players switch directions on the field, the chain crew also moves (for example, a marker may move from one 32-yard line to the other 32-yard line). The rear rod man moves past the forward rod man and continues to mark the start of the series of downs, in the new orientation. The linesman and other officials supervise this movement, using one or more clips to exactly reposition the chains.

On plays where there is no line to gain (a series of downs that starts within 10 yards of the goal line, a try after touchdown, or a kickoff), the rod men lower or lay down their signals, but the box man continues to mark the line of scrimmage.

=== On-field measurements ===
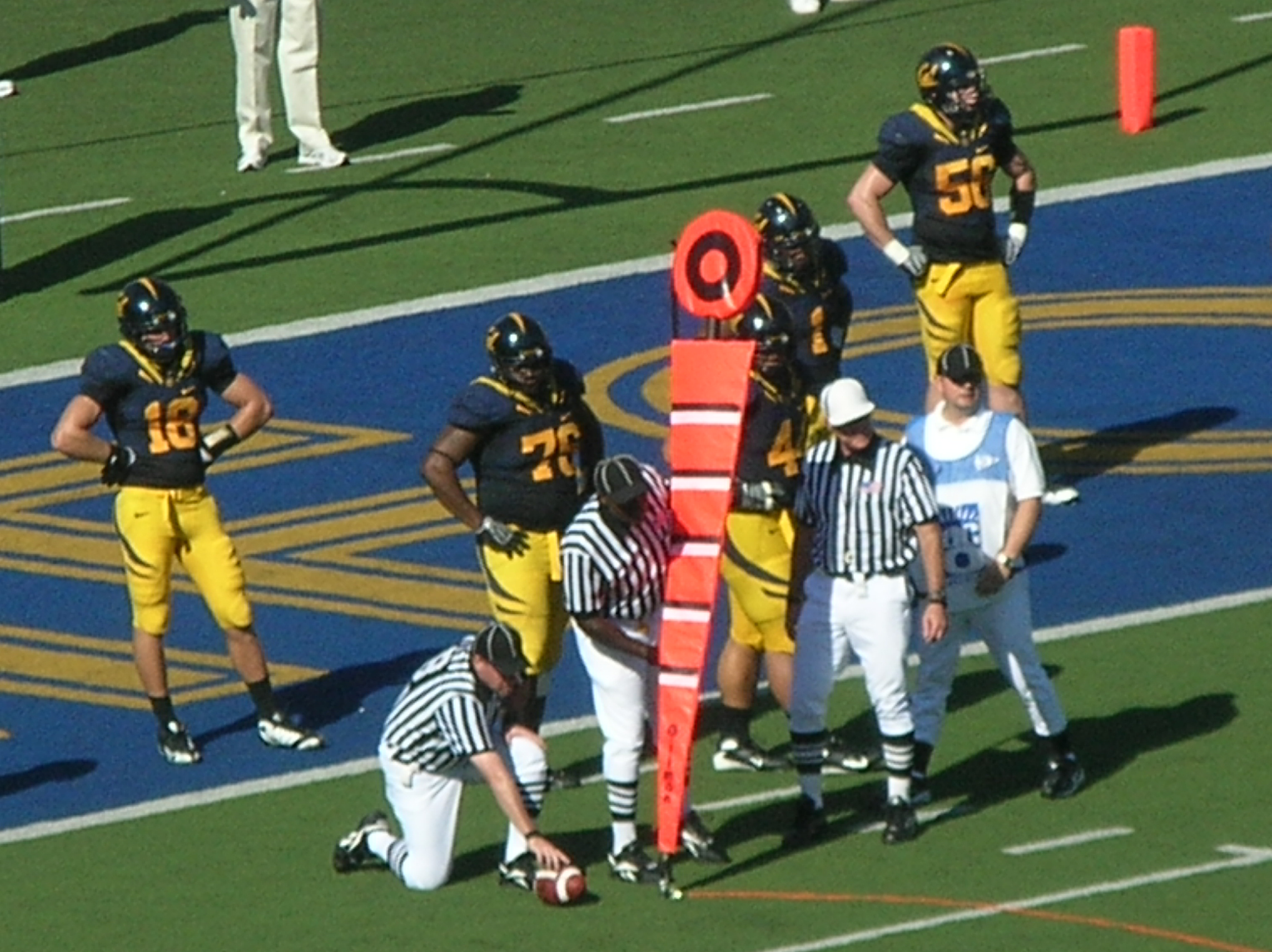
A first down measurement during a game between the USC Trojans and the California Golden Bears.

The chains are brought onto the field whenever the referee needs an accurate measurement to determine if a first down has been made. A team may also request an accurate measurement to determine how far they have to reach for the first down.

=== 5-yard mark ===
Before the game, many linesmen attach a piece of tape at the midpoint of the chain. The linesman can compare the line of scrimmage to this mark at the start of a play and know whether a 5-yard penalty against the defense will result in a first down. If so, the linesman's typical hand signal to the line judge across the field is to extend the arms with the thumbs pointing toward one another. Such a gesture with thumbs pointing away signals that there are more than 5 yards to gain.

== History ==
All levels of organized football have used the chain crew. The "box" (down marker) has evolved over time. In the pre-television era, it was a rod (shorter than the height of the operator) with a triangular pointer that rotated to show the official the down number. It was replaced with a much larger, two-sided flipper system when television became widespread; flipper-style down markers are still in use in scholastic and amateur football. A more modern model is the Dial-a-Down, in which compact levers display a new down number over the entire face of the "box"; this model is used at most college and professional games. Electronic down markers using LEDs are emerging as the next advance.

== Innovations ==
Early attempts and proposals to use precision automatic chain instruments were hindered both by costs and potential hazards (early proposals required metal rails; a 1990s system used visible lasers).

For the 1974 season, the World Football League used the "Dicker-rod," a proprietary stick approximately 3 yards (9.0 ft; 2.7 m) in length, which allowed measurements to be made with one person instead of three.

Lazser Down, which uses wideband radio waves to precisely spot and measure distances, has been used in college football, the Alliance of American Football and the XFL.

The 2022 revival of the United States Football League abolished the chain crew, instead relying on "Firsty," a proprietary remote-sensing system using lidar and a sensor inside the football. When the USFL and XFL merged to form the United Football League, they continued to use a similar technology, "TrU Line."

In July 2024, the NFL announced a partnership with Sony to use the company's Hawk-Eye computer vision technology to replace the chain crew. Like Hawk-Eye systems used in other sports, multiple camera views would track the ball from different angles in relation to the field. The NFL tested the system during selected 2024 preseason games. On April 1, 2025, the NFL announced that it will use Hawk-Eye to determine whether teams have made first downs for the 2025 season. Six 8k cameras will be placed at every NFL stadium and at international stadiums hosting NFL games. The NFL claims this will save up to 40 seconds from using the traditional method with the chain crew, who will remain on the field in a secondary capacity.
