= Georges Dicker =

American philosopher

Georges Dicker is an American philosopher. He attained a PhD in Philosophy from the University of Wisconsin–Madison in 1969 and is currently a SUNY Distinguished Professor at The College at Brockport, State University of New York.
