= Dikkers =

Dikkers is a surname of English origin, referring to a dike or ditch maker. It appears dating back to 1229. Variations include Dikker, Dicker, Decker, Deeker, Dyker, and Ditcher.

The name is shared by several noted people:

- Manfred Dikkers (born 1971), Dutch drummer
- Scott Dikkers (born 1965), American comedy writer, speaker and entrepreneur
- Sjoera Dikkers (born 1969), Dutch politician

== See also ==
- Dicker (surname)
- Decker (surname)
- Loek Dikker (born 1944), Dutch pianist, conductor, and composer
