= Shawn Bell =

American football coach and player

Current position
- Title: Quarterbacks coach
- Team: Houston
- Conference: Big 12

Biographical details
- Born: November 17, 1983 (age 42); China Spring, Texas, U.S.

Playing career
- 2002–2006: Baylor
- Position: Quarterback

Coaching career (HC unless noted)
- 2007: Stony Point HS (TX) (WR)
- 2008: China Spring HS (TX) (assistant)
- 2009: Clifton HS (TX)
- 2010–2015: Magnolia West HS (TX)
- 2016: Cedar Ridge HS (TX)
- 2017: Baylor (off. analyst)
- 2018–2019: Baylor (OL)
- 2020: Baylor (TE)
- 2021–2023: Baylor (QB)
- 2024: Houston (QB)
- 2024: Houston (interim OC/QB)
- 2025–present: Houston (QB)

Head coaching record
- Overall: 58–35 (high school)

Shawn Alan Bell (born November 17, 1983) is an American football coach and former quarterback who is currently the quarterbacks coach at Houston. He has also been the head coach at multiple Texas high schools.

== Playing career ==
=== High school ===
Bell played high school football under his father at China Spring High School and finished his prep career with 8,437 passing yards.

=== Baylor ===
Bell enrolled at Baylor University in 2002. After enjoying a red shirt year, Bell served as the Bears’ quarterback from 2003 to 2006.

== Coaching career ==
=== High school ===
Bell began his coaching in 2007 at Stony Point High School where he coached the wide receivers. In 2008 he went to his high school alma mater and worked as an assistant under his father. In 2009 he got his first head coaching job when he worked as the head coach for Clifton High School. From 2010 to 2015 he served as the head coach for Magnolia West High School. There he led the Mustangs to the postseason every season and compiled a record of 44–27. In 2016 he went to Cedar Ridge High School where he compiled an 11–1 record.

=== Baylor ===
Bell became a part of Matt Rhule's Baylor staff in December 2016. In 2017 he served as an offensive analyst. In March of 2018 he was promoted to the team's offensive line coach. In 2020 he was retained and moved to tight ends coach under new Baylor head coach Dave Aranda. In January 2021 he switched positions once more and was named quarterbacks coach.

=== Houston ===
Bell joined Willie Fritz's staff at Houston as the quarterbacks coach on December 18, 2023.

== Personal life ==
Shawn and his wife Hali are the parents of three children, Cannon, Braxton, and Saydi.

== Head coaching record ==
Year	Team	Overall	Conference	Standing	Bowl/playoffs
Clifton Cubs (Clifton Independent School District) (2009)
2009	Clifton	3–7	1–6	7th	
Clifton:		3–7	1–6		
Magnolia West Mustangs (Magnolia Independent School District) (2010–2015)
2010	Magnolia West	5–5	3–3	4th	
2011	Magnolia West	9–3	5–2	4th	
2012	Magnolia West	6–5	5–3	4th	
2013	Magnolia West	9–4	6–2	3rd	
2014	Magnolia West	6–6	4–3	3rd	
2015	Magnolia West	9–4	6–2	3rd	
Magnolia West:		44–27	29–15		
Cedar Ridge Raiders (Round Rock Independent School District) (2016)
2016	Cedar Ridge	11–1	6–0	1st	
Cedar Ridge:		11–1	6–0		
Total:		58–35			
National championship Conference title Conference division title or championship game berth
