= 2014 Lamar Cardinals football team =

American college football season

2014 Lamar Cardinals football
- Conference: Southland Conference
- Record: 8–4 (5–3 Southland)
- Head coach: Ray Woodard (5th season)
- Offensive coordinator: Larry Kueck (3rd season)
- Offensive scheme: Multiple
- Defensive coordinator: Craig McGallion (1st season)
- Base defense: 3–4
- Home stadium: Provost Umphrey Stadium

2014 Southland Conference football standings
	Conf.			Overall
Team	W		L	W		L
No. 6 Sam Houston St +^	7	–	1	11	–	5
No. 14 SE Louisiana +^	7	–	1	9	–	4
Lamar	5	–	3	8	–	4
Stephen F. Austin ^	5	–	3	8	–	5
Central Arkansas	5	–	3	6	–	6
McNeese State	4	–	4	6	–	5
Abilene Christian *	4	–	4	6	–	6
Northwestern State	4	–	4	6	–	6
Incarnate Word *	2	–	6	2	–	9
Houston Baptist	1	–	7	2	–	9
Nicholls State	0	–	8	0	–	12
+ – Conference co-champions; ^ – FCS playoff participant; * – ineligible for FCS playoffs due to transition from NCAA Division II; Rankings from The Sports Network poll

The 2014 Lamar Cardinals football team represented Lamar University in the 2014 NCAA Division I FCS football season. The Cardinals were led by fifth-year head coach Ray Woodard and played their home games at Provost Umphrey Stadium. They are a member of the Southland Conference. The Cardinals finished the season 8–4, 5–3 in Southland play to finish in a three-way tie for third place. The eight win overall and five win conference record matched the Cardinals' best overall win record in both categories as a four year program.

== TV and radio media ==
All Lamar games were broadcast on KLVI, also known as News Talk 560.

Live video of all home games (except those broadcast via the Southland Conference Television Network, SEC Network, or ESPN3) was streamed by Lamar University's Big Red Sports Network .

== Before the season ==
=== 2014 recruits ===
Lamar signed 17 players on national letter of intent day. Recruits are listed in the "Class of 2014 Signees" table below. Player profiles for each recruit are available at the signing day link below. The 2014 recruits included 10 players from high school and 7 transfers. Breaking down the transfers, two players transferred from NCAA Division I (FBS) programs. The remainder transferred from Junior College/Community College programs.

Signing Day Link:

=== Class of 2014 signees ===
2014 signees
Name	Pos.	Height	Weight	Year	Hometown	High School/Junior College	HS/TR
Seth Adams	DL	6'0"	285	Freshman	Silsbee, TX	Silsbee High School	HS
Seth Blenderman	OL	6'4"	290	Freshman	Magnolia, TX	Magnolia HS	HS
Ladamian Coney	DB	5'11"	175	Freshman	League City, TX	Clear Springs HS	HS
Reid Entsminger	DB	5'10"	185	Freshman	Stephens City, VA	Sherando HS	HS
Shawn Jones	LB	6'2"	220	Freshman	Jasper, TX	Jasper HS	HS
Melbrodrick Matthews	LB	6'0"	200	Freshman	Port Arthur, TX	Memorial HS	HS
Zack Roberts	DS	6'2"	215	Freshman	Magnolia, TX	Magnolia HS	HS
Tate Smith	TE	6'4"	235	Freshman	Texas City, TX	Texas City HS	HS
Connor Ward	OL	6'3"	280	Freshman	Bryan, TX	Bryan HS	HS
Chase Woods	OL	6'4"	285	Freshman	Plano, TX	Plano West HS	HS
Seth Ellis	DB	6'1"	185	Junior	Coolidge, AZ	Coolidge HS/Pima CC	TR
Carl Harris	RB	5'10"	190	Junior	Dallas, TX	Wilson HS/Memphis	TR
Kyle Holmes	DE	6'2"	245	Junior	Beaumont, TX	Beaumont Central HS/Blinn	TR
Brent Nicholson	DS	6'2"	260	Junior	Corinth, TX	Denton Guyer HS/Navarro JC	TR
Tylond Robertson	DE	6'3"	270	Sophomore	Hempstead, TX	Hempstead HS/Texas State	TR
Michael Sheridan	DB	5'10"	180	Junior	Palmdale, CA	Highland HS/Antelope Valley College	TR
Daquan Stewart	DB	6'1"	190	Junior	Hoboken, NJ	Hoboken HS/Contra Costa College	TR

=== 4th Crawfish Bowl ===
The 4th Annual Red-White Crawfish Bowl was held Saturday, March 1. The game was modified from previous years. While the team was divided into Red and White teams as in previous years, the game pitted offense against defense. The White team consisted of offensive players while the Red team was made up of defensive players. Scoring was adjusted to include normal scoring for the offense with the addition of additional points for scoring plays longer than 20 yards. The defense scored on turnovers, three-and-outs, and stops. The White team (offensive players) won 50–18 with the modified scoring.

=== Preseason honors ===
Four Lamar Cardinals were selected to the pre-season all Southland Conference team. Reggie Begelton, WR (JR) was selected to the First-Team Offense. Kevin Johnson, PR (SR) was selected to the First-Team Defense. Caleb Berry, QB (SR) and Justin Brock, OL (JR) were named to the Second-Team Offense.

The following Cardinals were named to national award watch lists.

- Caleb Berry - CFPA Quarterback Watch List
- Kade Harrington - CFPA Running Back Watch List
- Mark Roberts - CFPA Receiver Watch List
- Reggie Begelton - CFPA Receiver Watch List
- Alex Ball - CFPA Kicker Watch List
- Kevin Johnson - CFPA Kickoff Return Watch List, CFPA Punt Return Watch List, and the CFPA All-Purpose Performer of the Year Watch List.

Kevin Johnson was also named to the College Sports Madness Preseason All-American and the Beyond Sports Network Preseason All-American teams.

== Postseason honors ==
=== AP All-American ===
- Mark Roberts - AP All-American 3rd Team (FCS)
- Mark Roberts - Sports Network All-American 3rd Team (FCS)

=== Southland Conference honors ===
- Mark Roberts - First team All Southland Conference
- Caleb Berry - Second team All Southland Conference
- Reggie Begelton - Second team All Southland Conference
- Omar Tebo = Second team All Southland Conference
- Xavier Bethany - Second team All Southland Conference

=== College Sports Madness honors ===
- Mark Roberts - First team All Southland Conference
- Caleb Berry - Second team All Southland Conference
- Reggie Begelton - Second team All Southland Conference
- Ronnie Jones - Second team All Southland Conference
- Bret Treadway - Third team All Southland Conference
- Joe Okafor - Third team All Southland Conference
- Omar Tebo - Third team All Southland Conference
- Xavier Bethany - Third team All Southland Conference

== Roster ==
2014 Lamar Cardinals football team roster
Players
Coaches
Offense

Pos.	#	Name	Class
RB	1	Carl Harris	Jr
RB	3	Devonn Brown	Jr
WR	4	Jayce Nelson	Jr
WR	5	Mark Roberts	Sr
WR	6	Gratian Gladney	Jr
WR	7	Michael Handy	So
RB	8	Kade Harrington	So
WR	9	Reggie Begelton	Jr
QB	12	Caleb Berry	Sr
QB	13	Robert Mitchell	Fr
QB	14	Rex Dausin	Jr
TE	17	Dillon Barrett	Jr
RB	22	Emmett Raleigh	So
RB	26	Fisher Romar	So
RB	36	Jaquarious Johnson	Fr
RB	39	Cody Dupuy	Fr
RB	49	Mark Brown	Fr
OL	56	Chance McCormack	Sr
OL	58	Bret Treadway	So
OL	60	Richard Alfonso	So
OL	61	Blaine Myers	Fr
OL	63	Connor Ward	Fr
OL	64	Barrett Myers	Fr
OL	66	Chase Woods	Fr
OL	67	Hunter Rising	Fr
OL	69	Kre'von Swain	Fr
OL	70	Seth Blendermann	Fr
OL	71	Tramon Shead	Sr
OL	74	Kevin Greif	Fr
OL	76	Justin Brock	Jr
OL	78	John Craven	So
OL	79	Chance Allen	Fr
WR	80	Martell Hawthorne	Fr
WR	81	Caleb Hobbs	Fr
WR	82	Brent Salenga	Jr
TE	83	Tate Smith	Fr
WR	84	Seth Barrow	Fr
TE	85	Brannon Beaton	So
WR	87	Cort Harris	Fr
TE	88	Payden McVey	Sr
TE	89	Garrett Drake	So

Defense

Pos.	#	Name	Class
LB	2	Mike Hargis	Jr
DB	5	Montez Hunter	Sr
LB	10	Melbrodrick Matthews	Fr
DB	11	Kevin Johnson	Sr
DB	12	Colby Campbell	So
DB	15	Seth Ellis	Jr
DB	16	Judge Wolfe	Fr
DB	19	LaDamian Coney	Fr
DB	21	Michael Sheridan	Jr
DB	23	Lloyd Julian	So
DB	24	DaQuan Stewart	Jr
DB	25	Tommy Barrett	So
DB	27	Reid Entsminger	Fr
LB	28	Zach Johnson	So
LB	29	Xavier Bethany	So
DB	30	George Onebe	Sr
LB	32	Anthony Beard	Sr
DB	34	Tristan Ridge	So
DL	35	Joe Okafor	Sr
DB	37	Ronald Barrett	So
LB	38	Eddie McGill	So
LB	40	Shawn Jones	Fr
DL	41	Keith Curran	Sr
LB	44	Ronny Jones Jr	Jr
LB	45	Matt Tillett	Fr
LB	47	Kade Burman	Fr
LB	48	Artrell Taylor	Fr
LB	50	Cole Carleton	Fr
LB	52	Reggie Long	Fr
DL	53	David Hollyfield	Jr
LB	57	Kevin Gunnells	Jr
LB	59	Johnny Morris	Jr
DL	62	Seth Adams	Fr
DL	65	Omar Tebo	So
DB	86	Jared Gleseke	Fr
LB	91	Logan Moss	Jr
DL	92	Koby Couron	So
DL	93	Kyle Holmes	Jr
DL	95	Joshua Frost	Jr
DL	97	Larance Hale	Fr
DL	99	Corbin Carr	So

Special teams

Pos.	#	Name	Class
KR	5	Mark Roberts	Sr
K/P	31	Juan Carranco	So
DS	43	Brent Nicholson	Jr
K	46	Alex Ball	So
DS	54	Zach Roberts	Fr
K	96	Josh Davis	Fr

Head coach

- Ray Woodard (Texas)

Coordinators/assistant coaches

- Allen Johnson (East Texas A&M)
  Asst. head coach/secondary
- Larry Kueck (Stephen F. Austin)
  Offensive coordinator
- Craig McGallion (Houston)
  Defensive coordinator
- Carey Bailey (Tennessee)
  Asst. head coach/defensive line
- Arlington Nunn (Clemson)
  Receivers
- Ben Beasley (McNeese State)
  Secondary, recruiting coordinator
- Mark Criner (Boise State)
  Linebackers
- Chuck Langston (Oklahoma)
  Offensive line
- Brian Morgan (Grambling State)
  Running backs
- Brett Ramsey (Lamar)
  Director of football operations
- Eric Hicks (Lamar)
  Graduate assistant coach/linebackers
- Parker James
  Student assistant-offense
- Josh Miller (Southeastern Louisiana)
  Strength & conditioning
- Josh Yonker (Northern Colorado)
  Head trainer

Legend

- (C) Team captain
- (S) Suspended
- (I) Ineligible
- Injured
- Redshirt

Roster

=== Depth chart ===
Defense

FS
Xavier Bethany
DaQuan Stewart

Will Linebacker	MO Linebacker	Mike Linebacker	SLB
Logan Moss	Anthony Beard	Ronnie Jones	SLB_Starter
Kade Burman	Shawn Jones	Eddie McGill	SLB_Backup

SS
DaQuan Stewart
SS_Backup

CB
Montez Hunter
Lloyd Julian

DE	NT	DE
Keith Curran	Omar Tebo	Joe Okafor
Corbin Carr	Josh Frost	Koby Couron

CB
Seth Ellis
Tommie Barrett

Offense

X Receiver
Mark Roberts
Michael Handy

Z Receiver
Devonn Brown
Jayce Nelson

LT	LG	C	RG	RT
Tramon Shead	John Craven	Chance McCormack	Bret Treadway	Justin Brock
Chance Allen	Chase Woods	Kevin Greif	Connor Ward	Chance Allen

Y Receiver
Payden McVey
Dillon Barrett

A Receiver
Reggie Begelton
Gratian Gladney

QB
Caleb Berry
Robert Mitchell

RB
Kade Harrington
Carl Harris

Special teams
PK Juan Carranco
PK Alex Ball
P Juan Carranco
P Alex Ball
KR Michael Handy
PR Devonn Brown
LS Brent Nicholson
H Juan Carranco

== Schedule ==
Date	Time	Opponent	Site	TV	Result	Attendance
August 30	7:00 pm	Grambling State*	Provost Umphrey Stadium; Beaumont, TX	BRSN	W 42–27	9,520
September 6	6:30 pm	at No. 9 (FBS) Texas A&M*	Kyle Field; College Station, TX	SECN	L 3–73	104,728
September 13	7:00 pm	Texas College*	Provost Umphrey Stadium; Beaumont, TX	BRSN	W 73–0	7,226
September 20	7:00 pm	Mississippi College*	Provost Umphrey Stadium; Beaumont, TX	BRSN	W 55–10	7,612
September 27	7:00 pm	Sam Houston State	Provost Umphrey Stadium; Beaumont, TX	BRSN	L 10–42	9,308
October 4	6:00 pm	at Abilene Christian	Shotwell Stadium; Abilene, TX	ACU TV, KTES	W 24–21	8,913
October 11	6:00 pm	No. 9 Southeastern Louisiana	Provost Umphrey Stadium; Beaumont, TX	BRSN	L 34–61	7,799
October 18	3:00 pm	at Nicholls State	John L. Guidry Stadium; Thibodaux, LA	CAA	W 63–21	5,103
November 1	6:00 pm	Houston Baptist^{†}	Provost Umphrey Stadium; Beaumont, TX	ESPN3	W 72–14	10,212
November 8	3:00 pm	at Central Arkansas	Estes Stadium; Conway, AR	SLCTV	L 41–44 ^{OT}	5,427
November 15	6:00 pm	Incarnate Word	Provost Umphrey Stadium; Beaumont, TX	BRSN	W 31–20	6,751
November 22	6:00 pm	at No. 19 McNeese State	Cowboy Stadium; Lake Charles, LA (Battle of the Border)		W 27–24	7,402
*Non-conference game; ^{†}Homecoming; Rankings from The Sports Network Poll released prior to the game; All times are in Central time

== Game summaries ==
=== Grambling State ===
Grambling State at Lamar

Team	1	2	3	4	Total
Tigers	7	6	7	7	27
• Cardinals	7	7	28	0	42

- Date: August 30
- Location: Provost Umphrey Stadium
  Beaumont, TX
- Game start: 7:00 PM CDT
- Elapsed time: 3:47
- Game attendance: 9,520
- Game weather: Temp: 80, Wind: S at 6m, Weather: Rainy
- Referee: Eddie Kelley
- TV announcers (Live Streaming - Big Red Sports Network): Harold Mann - Play by Play, Bo Brown - Color

Scoring summary
1	11:32	Lamar	Mark Roberts 69-yard touchdown pass from Caleb Berry, Alex Ball kick good	7–0
1	9:32	Grambling State	2-yard touchdown run by Dre Fusilier, Mark Orozco kick good	7–7
2	12:31	Grambling State	41-yard field goal, Mark Orozco	7–10
2	4:06	Lamar	R. 8-yard touchdown run by Kade Harrington, Alex Ball kick good	14–10
2	:42	Grambling State	27-yard field goal, Mark Orozco	14–13
3	10:05	Lamar	Reggie Begleton 10-yard touchdown pass from Caleb Berry, Josh Davis kick good	21–13
3	4:52	Lamar	Devonn Brown 5-yard touchdown pass from Caleb Berry, Juan Carranco kick good	28–13
3	2:50	Lamar	Mark Roberts 43-yard touchdown pass from Caleb Berry, Josh Davis kick good	35–13
3	1:55	Lamar	Jayce Nelson 45-yard touchdown pass from Caleb Berry, Josh Davis kick good	42–13
3	:42	Grambling State	2-yard touchdown run by Jestin Kelly, Mark Orozco kick good	42–20
4	10:17	Grambling State	Stephen Johnson 4-yard touchdown run, Mark Orozco kick good	42–27

Caleb Berry set the all-time Lamar Cardinals passing touchdown record on his third touchdown pass of the game against the Grambling State Tigers.

=== # 9 (FBS) Texas A&M ===
Lamar at Texas A&M

Team	1	2	3	4	Total
Cardinals	3	0	0	0	3
• Aggies	21	10	14	28	73

- Date: September 6
- Location: Kyle Field
  College Station, TX
- Game start: 8:44 pm CDT
- Elapsed time: 3:29
- Game attendance: 104,728
- Game weather: Temp: 83, Wind: SE 15, Weather: Lightning Delay
- Referee: Jason Autrey
- TV announcers (SECN): Dave Baker - Play by Play, Greg McElroy - Color, Niki Noto - Sideline

Scoring summary
1	13:18	Texas A&M	Trey Williams 33 yd run, Josh Lambo kick good	0–7
1	8:00	Lamar	20-yard field goal, Josh Davis	3–7
1	5:55	Texas A&M	R Seals-Jones 24 yd pass from Kenny Hill, Josh Lambo kick good	3–14
1	2:15	Texas A&M	Sabian Holmes 51 yd pass from Kenny Hill, Josh Lambo kick good	3–21
2	14:41	Texas A&M	Josh Lambo 20 yd field goal	3–24
2	7:48	Texas A&M	Edward Pope 9 yd pass from Kenny Hill, Josh Lambo kick good	3–31
3	13:16	Texas A&M	Malcome Kennedy 18 yd pass from Kenny Hill, Josh Lambo good	3–38
3	7:13	Texas A&M	James White 1 yd run, Josh Lambo kick good	3–45
4	12:51	Texas A&M	James White 3 yd run, Josh Lambo kick good	3–52
4	8:33	Texas A&M	B. Niederhofer 2 yd pass from Kyle Allen, Josh Lambo kick good	3–59
4	5:30	Texas A&M	L. Gonzalez 33 yd pass from Kyle Allen, Josh Lambo kick good	3–66
4	1:26	Texas A&M	Brice Dolezal 41 yd run, Josh Lambo kick good	3–73

The Cardinals and the 9th ranked Aggies played in front of a record setting crowd at Kyle Field. The crowd of 104,728 set the record for the largest attendance in recently renovated Kyle Field and for a collegiate game in the state of Texas. The game was delayed 2:05 hours because of lightning.

=== Texas College ===
Texas College at Lamar

Team	1	2	3	4	Total
Steers	0	0	0	0	0
• Cardinals	28	21	10	14	73

- Date: September 13
- Location: Provost Umphrey Stadium
  Beaumont, TX
- Game start: 7:00 pm CDT
- Elapsed time: 2:54
- Game attendance: 7,226
- Game weather: Temperature: 76 • Wind: N at 6 • Weather: Cloudy Skies
- Referee: Dan Lewis
- TV announcers (Live Streaming - Big Red Sports Network): Harold Mann - Play by Play, Bo Brown - Color

Scoring summary
1	12:37	Lamar	Emmitt Raleigh 45 yd run, Josh Davis kick good	7–0
1	10:33	Lamar	Reggie Begelton 6 yd pass from Caleb Berry, Josh Davis kick good	14–0
1	5:52	Lamar	Ronnie Jones 38 yd blocked punt return, Josh Davis kick good	21–0
1	0:08	Lamar	Mark Roberts 21 yd run, Josh Davis kick good	28–0
2	11:53	Lamar	Mark Roberts 21 yd pass from Caleb Berry, Josh Davis kick good	35–0
2	8:22	Lamar	Caleb Berry 32 yd run, Josh Davis kick good	42–0
2	0:53	Lamar	Carl Harris 13 yd run, Josh Davis good	49–0
3	10:54	Lamar	Robert Mitchell 4 yd run, Josh Davis kick good	56–0
3	4:49	Lamar	Josh Davis 43 yd field goal	59–0
4	3:42	Lamar	Rex Dausin 18 yd run, Josh Davis kick good	66–0
4	3:22	Lamar	Ronald Barrett 52 yd pass interception return, Josh Davis kick good	73–0

=== Mississippi College ===
Mississippi College at Lamar

Team	1	2	3	4	Total
Choctaws	7	3	0	0	10
• Cardinals	14	17	17	7	55

- Date: September 20
- Location: Provost Umphrey Stadium
  Beaumont, TX
- Game start: 7:00 pm CDT
- Elapsed time: 2:46
- Game attendance: 7,612
- Game weather: Temperature: 86 • Wind: 7 ESE • Weather: Partly Cloudy
- Referee: Chris Tallent
- TV announcers (Live Streaming - Big Red Sports Network): Harold Mann - Play by Play, Bo Brown - Color

Scoring summary
1	11:17	LU	Gratia Gladney 6 yd pass from Caleb Berry, Josh Davis kick good	7-0
1	06:51	Mississippi College	Kyle Smith 12 yd run, Tyler Poe kick good	7–7
1	02:29	Lamar	Carl Harris 1 yd run, Josh Davis kick good	14–7
2	13:41	Mississippi College	Hunter Estess 37 yd field goal	14–10
2	11:02	Lamar	Josh Davis 28 yd field goal	17–10
2	01:50	Lamar	Carl Harris 1 yd run, Josh Davis kick good	24–10
2	00:00	Lamar	Reggie Begelton 44 yd pass from Caleb Berry, Josh Davis kick good	31–10
3	08:35	Lamar	Devonn Brown 17 yd pass from Caleb Berry, Josh Davis kick good	38–10
3	03:46	Lamar	Josh Davis 25 yd field goal	41–10
3	01:35	Lamar	Carl Harris 37 yd run, Josh Davis kick good	48–10
4	02:42	Lamar	Matt Johnson 0 yd fumble recovery, Josh Davis kick good	55–10

=== Sam Houston State ===
Sam Houston State at Lamar

Team	1	2	3	4	Total
• Bearkats	13	6	7	16	42
Cardinals	0	3	7	0	10

- Date: September 27
- Location: Provost Umphrey Stadium
  Beaumont, TX
- Game start: 7:00 pm CDT
- Elapsed time: 3:22
- Game attendance: 9,308
- Game weather: Temperature: 74 • Wind: 5 mph E • Weather: Cloudy Skies
- Referee: Eddy Shelton
- TV announcers (Live Streaming - Big Red Sports Network): Harold Mann - Play by Play, Bo Brown - Color

Scoring summary
1	12:23	Sam Houston State	Keshawn Hill 2 yd run; Luc Swimberghe kick good	0–7
1	07:53	Sam Houston State	Luc Swimberghe 28 yd field goal	0–10
1	02:29	Sam Houston State	Luc Swimberghe 33 yd field goal	0–13
2	02:59	Lamar	Josh Davis 33 yd field goal	3–13
2	00:50	Sam Houston State	Donav Williams 6 yd run; Luc Swimberghe kick blocked	3–19
3	09:05	Lamar	Mark Roberts 32 yd pass from Caleb Berry, Josh Davis kick good	10–19
3	06:24	Sam Houston State	Gerald Thomas 22 yd pass from Jared Johnson, Luc Swimberghe kick good	10–26
4	10:57	Sam Houston State	Jal Overstreet 50 yd run, Luc Swimberghe kick failed	10–32
4	09:03	Sam Houston State	Luc Swimberghe 22 yd field goal	10–35
4	04:50	Sam Houston State	Donav Williams 1 yd run, Luc Swimberghe kick good	10–42

=== Abilene Christian ===
Lamar at Abilene Christian

Team	1	2	3	4	Total
• Cardinals	7	3	0	14	24
Wildcats	7	0	7	7	21

- Date: October 4
- Location: Shotwell Stadium
  Abilene, TX
- Game start: 6:00 pm CDT
- Elapsed time: 3:14
- Game attendance: 8,913
- Game weather: Temperature: 79 • Wind: S 12mph • Weather: Sunny
- Referee: Kevin Hassell
- TV announcers (KTES): Grant Boone, Lance Fleming, and Matt Sloan

Scoring summary
1	07:38	Abilene Christian	Cedric Gilbert, 38 yd pass from McKenzie, Parker (Nik Grau kick good)	0–7
1	02:46	Lamar	Kade Harrington 3 yd run (Josh Davis kick good)	7–7
2	03:59	Lamar	Josh Davis 19 yd field goal	10–7
3	01:51	Abilene Christian	Mo Green-Avery 65 yd pass from Cade Stone (Nik Grau kick good)	10–14
4	10:29	Abilene Christian	Noah Cheshier 10 yd pass from Parker McKenzie (Nik Grau kick good)	10–21
4	07:52	Lamar	Payden McVey 12 yd pass from Caleb Berry (Mark Roberts pass from Caleb Berry)	18–21
4	02:30	Lamar	Mark Roberts 14 yd pass from Caleb Berry (Josh Davis kick failed)	24–21

=== Southeastern Louisiana ===
Southeastern Louisiana at Lamar

Team	1	2	3	4	Total
• #9 Lions	3	14	17	27	61
Cardinals	6	7	14	7	34

- Date: October 11
- Location: Provost Umphrey Stadium
  Beaumont, TX
- Game start: 6:00 PM CDT
- Elapsed time: 3:13
- Game attendance: 7,799
- Game weather: Temperature: 77 • Wind: 5mph N • Weather: Partly Cloudy/Windy
- Referee: David Alvarez
- TV announcers (Live Streaming - Big Red Sports Network): Harold Mann - Play by Play, Bo Brown - Color

Scoring summary
1	10:14	Lamar	Carl Harris 11 yd run (Juan Carranco kick blocked)	6-0
1	05:30	Southeastern Louisiana	Adams, R. 37 yd field goal	6-3
2	09:13	Southeastern Louisiana	Bennett, B. 1 yd run (Adams, R. kick)	6-10
2	07:56	Lamar	Mark Roberts 38 yd pass from Caleb Berry (Juan Carranco kick)	13-10
2	05:35	Southeastern Louisiana	Bennett, B. 3 yd run (Adams, R. kick)	13-17
3	14:10	Southeastern Louisiana	Roberson, X. 75 yd run (Adams, R. kick)	13-24
3	12:14	Southeastern Louisiana	Bennett, B. 64 yd run (Adams, R. kick)	13-31
3	06:52	Lamar	Kade Harrington 12 yd run (Juan Carranco kick)	20-31
3	03:42	Southeastern Louisiana	Adams, R. 23 yd field goal	20-34
3	01:40	Lamar	Xavier Bethany 40 yd interception return (Juan Carranco kick)	27-34
4	14:25	Southeastern Louisiana	Bennett, J. 16 yd pass from Bennett, B. (Adams, R. kick)	27-41
4	10:38	Southeastern Louisiana	Johnson, B. 0 yd fumble recovery (Adams, R. kick)	27-48
4	07:41	Southeastern Louisiana	Sutton, K. 3 yd run (LeBlanc, C. pass failed)	27-54
4	06:13	Southeastern Louisiana	Hayes, M. 57 yd run (Callian, T. kick)	27-61
4	02:25	Lamar	Kade Harrington 24 yd pass from Caleb Berry (Juan Carranco kick)	34-61

The game was close going into the fourth (4th) quarter with Southeastern Louisiana holding a one touchdown lead. The fourth quarter was a different story with the Lions running away scoring four touchdowns for 27 points to the Cardinals' one touchdown in the quarter.

=== Nicholls State ===
Lamar at Nicholls State

Team	1	2	3	4	Total
• Cardinals	14	28	14	7	63
Colonels	0	7	7	7	21

- Date: October 18
- Location: John L. Guidry Stadium
  Thibodaux, LA
- Game start: 3:00 pm CDT
- Elapsed time: 3:00
- Game attendance: 5,103
- Game weather: Temperature: 82 • Wind: NW 3 mph • Weather: Sunny and clear
- Referee: Ken Ray

Scoring summary
1	12:59	Lamar	Roberts, Mark 59 yd pass from Berry, Caleb (Carranco, Juan kick)	7-0
1	03:37	Lamar	Harrington, Kad 19 yd run (Carranco, Juan kick	14-0
2	13:33	Lamar	Begelton, Reggi 4 yd pass from Berry, Caleb (Carranco, Juan kick)	21-0
2	11:01	Lamar	Harrington, Kad 8 yd run (Carranco, Juan kick)	28-0
2	09:44	Lamar	Harrington, Kad 4 yd run (Carranco, Juan kick)	35-0
2	05:27	Lamar	Gladney, Gratia 3 yd run (Carranco, Juan kick)	42-0
2	00:33	Nicholls	Marcus, Xavier 21 yd pass from Henderson, Kale (Fryoux, Conner kick)	42-7
3	10:28	Lamar	Harris, Carl 2 yd run (Carranco, Juan kick)	49-7
3	07:30	Nicholls	Canty, Keenan 83 yd punt return (Fryoux, Conner kick)	49-14
3	02:21	Lamar	Harrington, Kad 3 yd run (Carranco, Juan kick)	56-14
4	13:31	Nicholls	Canty, Keenan 5 yd pass from Hebert, Beaux (Fryoux, Conner kick)	56-21
4	07:37	Lamar	Mitchell, Rober 48 yd run (Carranco, Juan kick)	63-21

Caleb Berry broke three team marks becoming the Cardinals' all-time leader in completions, yards of total offense, and passing yards. Lamar set a school record of 691 total yards in the game.

=== Houston Baptist ===
Houston Baptist at Lamar

Team	1	2	3	4	Total
Huskies	0	7	0	7	14
• Cardinals	28	34	10	0	72

- Date: November 1
- Location: Provost Umphrey Stadium
  Beaumont, TX
- Game start: 6:04 pm CDT
- Elapsed time: 3:19
- Game attendance: 10,212
- Game weather: Temperature: 64 • Wind: 5 mph • Weather: Clear and cold
- Referee: Kevin Hassell
- TV announcers (ESPN3): Lincoln Rose and Rene Nadeau

Scoring summary
1	11:24	Lamar	Roberts, Mark 31 yd pass from Berry, Caleb (Carranco, Juan kick)	7-0
1	07:03	Lamar	Roberts, Mark 61 yd pass from Berry, Caleb (Carranco, Juan kick)	14-0
1	02:20	Lamar	Gladney, Gratia 57 yd pass from Berry, Caleb (Carranco, Juan kick)	21-0
1	01:01	Lamar	Roberts, Mark 81 yd pass from Berry, Caleb (Carranco, Juan kick)	28-0
2	12:57	Lamar	Brown, Devonn 25 yd pass from Berry, Caleb (Carranco, Juan kick)	35-0
2	08:13	Lamar	Nelson, Jayce 24 yd pass from Berry, Caleb (Carranco, Juan kick)	42-0
2	05:23	Houston Baptist	Thompson, Taylo 52 yd interception return (Shinn, Travis kick)	42-7
2	02:16	Lamar	Harrington, Kad 14 yd run (Carranco, Juan kick)	49-7
2	00:46	Lamar	Stewart, DaQuan 56 yd interception return (Carranco, Juan kick blockd)	55-7
2	00:27	Lamar	Roberts, Mark 26 yd pass from Berry, Caleb (Carranco, Juan kick)	62-7
3	06:50	Lamar	Salenga, Brent 1 yd run (Carranco, Juan kick)	69-7
3	00:44	Lamar	Carranco, Juan 43 yd field goal	72-7
4	00:00	Houston Baptist	Robinson, Jacki 1 yd run (Shinn, Travis kick)	72-14

With his four touchdown pass catches in the game, Mark Roberts set a new school record of nineteen (19) career TD catches. Roberts also tied a school record of 24 points scored in a game.

=== Central Arkansas ===
Lamar at Central Arkansas

Team	1	2	3	4	OT	Total
Cardinals	17	7	0	17	0	41
• Bears	21	7	3	10	3	44

- Date: November 8
- Location: Estes Stadium
  Conway, AR
- Game start: 3:00 pm CST
- Elapsed time: 3:51
- Game attendance: 5,427
- Game weather: Temperature: 63 • Wind: 10 mph • Weather: Sunny
- Referee: D. Alvarez
- TV announcers (SLCTV): Randy McEvoy, Shea Walker, Brook Bentley

Scoring summary
1	12:46	Central Arkansas	Lewis, D. 11 yd pass from Howard, R. (Camara, E. kick)	0-7
1	07:15	Lamar	Begelton, Reggi 3 yd pass from Berry, Caleb (Carranco, Juan kick)	7-7
1	04:40	Lamar	Nelson, Jayce 5 yd pass from Berry, Caleb (Carranco, Juan kick)	14-7
1	04:27	Central Arkansas	Wilson, J. 91 yd kickoff return (Camara, E. kick)	14-14
1	03:12	Lamar	Carranco, Juan 36 yd field goal	17-14
1	02:22	Central Arkansas	Lewis, D. 49 yd pass from Howard, R. (Camara, E. kick)	17-21
2	11:36	Lamar	Begelton, Reggi 20 yd pass from Berry, Caleb (Carranco, Juan kick)	24-21
2	03:05	Central Arkansas	Whitehead, C. 44 yd pass from Howard, R. (Camara, E. kick)	24-28
3	06:57	Central Arkansas	Camara, E. 38 yd field goal	24-31
4	13:40	Lamar	Carranco, Juan 21 yd field goal	27-31
4	12:00	Central Arkansas	Matthews, W. 4 yd run (Camara, E. kick)	27-38
4	08:10	Lamar	Harrington, Kad 3 yd run (Berry, Caleb pass failed)	33-38
4	02:20	Central Arkansas	Camara, E. 40 yd field goal	33-41
4	00:40	Lamar	Nelson, Jayce 5 yd pass from Berry, Caleb (Roberts, Mark pass from Berry, Caleb)	41-41
OT	15:00	Central Arkansas	Camara, E. 25 yd field goal	41-44

=== Incarnate Word ===
Incarnate Word at Lamar

Team	1	2	3	4	Total
UIW	0	13	0	7	20
• Lamar	7	14	10	0	31

- Date: November 15
- Location: Provost Umphrey Stadium
  Beaumont, TX
- Game start: 6:00 pm CST
- Elapsed time: 3:15
- Game attendance: 6,751
- Game weather: Temperature: 54 deg. • Wind: 9mph NW • Weather: Cloudy
- Referee: Randy Christal
- TV announcers (Live Streaming - Big Red Sports Network): Harold Mann - Play by Play, Bo Brown - Color

Scoring summary
1	03:02	Lamar	Harrington, Kad 1 yd run (Carranco, Juan kick)	7-0
2	11:50	Lamar	Gladney, Gratian 8 yd pass from Berry, Caleb (Carranco, Juan kick)	14-0
2	10:41	Incarnate Word	Reeves, Broderick 35 yd run (Coto, Ramon kick failed)	14-6
2	05:19	Lamar	Nelson, Jayce 9 yd pass from Berry, Caleb (Carranco, Juan kick)	21-6
2	03:53	Incarnate Word	Reeves, Broderick 25 yd run (Coto, Ramon kick)	21-13
3	11:03	Lamar	Roberts, Mark 78 yd pass from Berry, Caleb (Carranco, Juan kick)	28-13
3	00:42	Lamar	Carranco, Juan 26 yd field goal	31-13
4	05:30	Incarnate Word	Brooks, Daryl 2 yd pass from Scelfo, Jordan (Coto, Ramon kick)	31-20

=== McNeese State ===
Lamar at McNeese State

Team	1	2	3	4	Total
• Cardinals	14	3	7	3	27
Cowboys	7	3	0	14	24

- Date: November 22
- Location: Cowboy Stadium
  Lake Charles, LA
- Game start: 6:00 pm CST
- Elapsed time: 3:25
- Game attendance: 7,402
- Game weather: Temperature: 71 • Wind: SE 21+ • Weather: Cloudy
- Referee: Kevin Hassell

Scoring summary
1	09:49	McNeese State	Thomas, Khalil 20 yd pass from Bolfing, Tyler (Kjellsten, Alex kick)	0-7
1	04:45	Lamar	Nelson, Jayce 17 yd pass from Berry, Caleb (Carranco, Juan kick	7-7
1	02:04	Lamar	Roberts, Mark 43 yd pass from Berry, Caleb (Carranco, Juan kick	14-7
2	09:10	Lamar	Carranco, Juan 24 yd field goal	17-7
2	04:27	McNeese State	Kjellsten, Alex 31 yd field goal	17-10
3	07:15	Lamar	Harrington, Kad 2 yd run (Carranco, Juan kick)	24-10
4	12:36	McNeese State	Bush, David 5 yd pass from Briscoe, Will (Breaux, Jean kick)	24-17
4	04:20	McNeese State	Celestie, Ernes 10 yd pass from Briscoe, Will (Kjellsten, Alex kick)	24-24
4	00:00	Lamar	Carranco, Juan 23 yd field goal	27-24
