= Jordan Groshans =

American baseball player (born 1999)

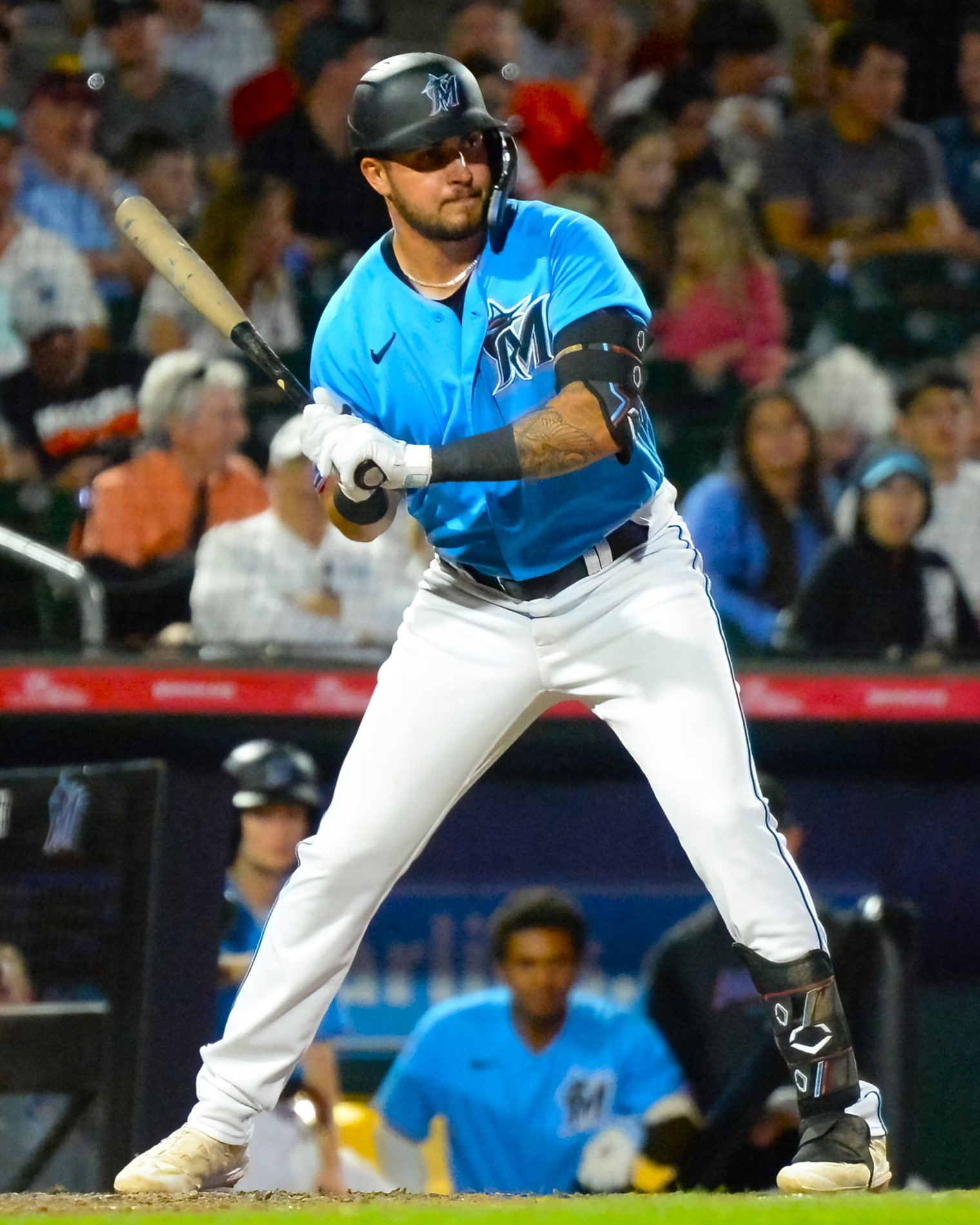
- Groshans with the Miami Marlins

Atlanta Braves
- Infielder
- Born: November 10, 1999 (age 26); Magnolia, Texas, U.S.
- Bats: Right Throws: Right

MLB debut
- September 13, 2022, for the Miami Marlins

MLB statistics (through 2022 season)
- Batting average: .262
- Home runs: 1
- Runs batted in: 2
- Stats at Baseball Reference

Teams
- Miami Marlins (2022)

Jordan Lee Groshans (born November 10, 1999) is an American professional baseball infielder in the Atlanta Braves organization. He has previously played in Major League Baseball (MLB) for the Miami Marlins. The Toronto Blue Jays selected Groshans in the first round, with the 12th overall selection, in the 2018 MLB draft, and he made his MLB debut in 2022 for the Marlins.

== Amateur career ==
Groshans attended Magnolia High School in Magnolia, Texas. In July 2017, the summer before his senior year, he played in the Under Armour All American Game at Wrigley Field. As a senior, he batted .444 with 11 home runs and 36 runs batted in (RBI). Prior to the 2018 draft, he had committed to play college baseball at the University of Kansas.

== Professional career ==
=== Toronto Blue Jays ===
The Toronto Blue Jays selected Groshans in the first round, with the 12th overall selection, in the 2018 Major League Baseball draft. He signed with the Blue Jays on June 12 and received a $3.4 million signing bonus. Groshans was assigned to the Rookie-level Gulf Coast League Blue Jays to begin his professional career before being promoted to the Bluefield Blue Jays of the Advanced-Rookie Appalachian League in August. In 48 games between the two clubs, Groshans hit .296 with five home runs and 43 RBI.

Groshans began 2019 with the Lansing Lugnuts of the Single–A Midwest League. He appeared in only 23 games, batting .337 with two home runs and 13 RBI before being shut down for the remainder of the season with a foot injury. Groshans did not play in a game in 2020 due to the cancellation of the minor league season because of the COVID-19 pandemic. For the 2021 season, he was assigned to the New Hampshire Fisher Cats of the Double-A Northeast. He missed playing time in May due to a sore back and was also placed on the injured list in early September, causing him to miss the end of the season. Over 75 games for the season, Groshans slashed .291/.367/.450 with seven home runs and forty RBI. He opened the 2022 season on the injured list with an oblique strain. Groshans was activated shortly after the season started and was assigned to the Buffalo Bisons of the Triple-A International League.

=== Miami Marlins ===
On August 2, 2022, Groshans was traded to the Miami Marlins for Anthony Bass, Zach Pop, and a player to be named later (named Edward Duran on August 31) He was assigned to the Jacksonville Jumbo Shrimp of the Triple-A International League.

On September 13, 2022, the Marlins selected Groshans's contract and promoted him to the major leagues. After going hitless in his debut, Groshans went 3–for–3 the following day against the Philadelphia Phillies to collect his first three major–league hits. On September 15, Groshans hit his first career home run off Noah Syndergaard of the Philadelphia Phillies.

Groshans was optioned to Triple-A Jacksonville to begin the 2023 season. He spent the entire season with Jacksonville, playing in 125 games and batting .244/.339/.330 with six home runs and 60 RBI. Groshans was designated for assignment on February 6, 2024, following the acquisition of Jonah Bride.

=== New York Yankees ===
On February 13, 2024, Groshans was claimed off waivers by the New York Yankees, but was designated for assignment by the team on February 28. He cleared waivers and was sent outright to the Triple–A Scranton/Wilkes-Barre RailRiders on March 3. Groshans made 17 appearances for Scranton, hitting .228 with one home run and seven RBI; he also played in 34 games for the Double-A Somerset Patriots, batting .234 with eight RBI.

=== Oakland Athletics ===
On June 23, 2024, the Yankees traded Groshans to the Oakland Athletics for J. D. Davis and cash considerations. In 51 games for the Double-A Midland RockHounds, he slashed .239/.312/.352 with three home runs and 19 RBI. Groshans elected free agency following the season on November 4.

=== Kansas City Royals ===
On December 3, 2024, Groshans signed a minor league contract with the Kansas City Royals. He made 67 appearances for the Double-A Northwest Arkansas Naturals and Triple-A Omaha Storm Chasers in 2025, batting a cumulative .284/.360/.362 with three home runs and 36 RBI. Groshans elected free agency following the season on November 6, 2025.

=== Atlanta Braves ===
On January 23, 2026, Groshans signed a minor league contract with the Atlanta Braves. He played in 115 games with the Double-A Columbus Clingstones and Triple-A Gwinnett Stripers and batted .276 with seven home runs and 33 RBI.

On November 3, 2026, Groshans re-signed a minor league contract with the Braves for the 2027 season.

== Personal life ==
Groshans' older brother, Jaxx, played college baseball at the University of Kansas, was drafted in the fifth round of the 2019 MLB draft by the Boston Red Sox, and currently plays for the Cleburne Railroaders.
