= Stagecoach, Texas =

- Town
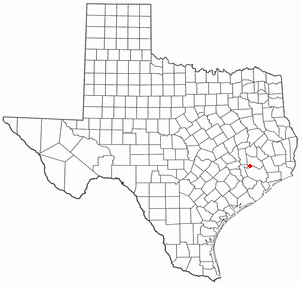
- Location of Stagecoach, Texas

- Coordinates: 30°8′34″N 95°42′40″W
- Country: United States
- State: Texas
- County: Montgomery

Area
  - Total: 1.18 sq mi (3.05 km^{2})
  - Land: 1.15 sq mi (2.98 km^{2})
  - Water: 0.027 sq mi (0.07 km^{2})
- Elevation: 194 ft (59 m)

Population (2020)
  - Total: 580
  - Density: 500/sq mi (190/km^{2})
- Time zone: UTC-6 (Central (CST))
  - Summer (DST): UTC-5 (CDT)
- Postal code: Magnolia, Tx 77355
- FIPS code: 48-69932
- GNIS feature ID: 1388583
- Website: stagecoachtx.gov

Stagecoach is a town in Montgomery County, Texas, United States. Its population was 580 at the 2020 census.

== History ==
In the 19th century, the community was a stop on a stagecoach route. Farms were later established in the area, and what would become Stagecoach was a farm owned by W. L. Swinley. The Stagecoach residential development was established in 1958. In the 1960s, the civic club opened. An unofficial mayor was elected in 1974. By 1980, 108 residences were in the community. It was incorporated that year. The community grew to 340 in 1990 and 455 in 2000.

== Geography ==
Stagecoach is located at 30°8′34″N 95°42′40″W (30.142858, –95.711232).

According to the United States Census Bureau, the town has a total area of 1.2 square miles (3.1 km^{2}), of which 1.1 square miles (2.8 km^{2}) is land and 0.1 square miles (0.26 km^{2}) (4.20%) is covered by water.

The street names reflect the city's history. They include: Boot Hill, Broken Spoke, Cimarron, Westward Ho, Indian Springs, Old Coach, Silver Spur, Surrey, Tomahawk, Wagon Wheel, Lone Shadow, Deer Creek Way, Frontier Rd, and Shady Oaks Dr. Lake Apache and Lake Hardin, located along Sulphur Creek, are Stagecoach's artificial lakes.

== Demographics ==
Historical population
Census	Pop.	Note	%±
1980	349		—
1990	340		−2.6%
2000	455		33.8%
2010	538		18.2%
2020	580		7.8%
U.S. Decennial Census; 2020 Census

As of the census of 2010, 538 people, 155 households, and 137 families were residing in the town. The population density was 399.9 inhabitants per square mile (154.4/km^{2}). The 162 housing units had an average density of 142.4 per square mile (55.0/km^{2}). The racial makeup of the town was 96.48% White, 0.22% Native American, and 2.86% from two or more races. Hispanics or Latinos of any race were 4.40% of the population.

Of the 155 households, 38.7% had children under 18 living with them, 80.6% were married couples living together, 5.8% had a female householder with no husband present, and 11.0% were not families. About 9.0% of all households were made up of individuals, and 3.9% had someone living alone who was 65 or older. The average household size was 2.94 and the average family size was 3.11.

In the town, the age distribution was 26.8% under 18, 5.5% from 18 to 24, 28.4% from 25 to 44, 31.6% from 45 to 64, and 7.7% who were 65 or older. The median age was 41 years. For every 100 females, there were 92.8 males. For every 100 females 18 and over, there were 93.6 males.

The median income for a household was $68,750 and for a family was $76,353. Males had a median income of $58,750 versus $37,614 for females. The per capita income for the town was $30,128. About 5.5% of families and 5.8% of the population were below the poverty line, including 3.1% of those under 18 and 1.9% of those 65 or over.

== Education ==
About half of Stagecoach residents are zoned to schools in the Magnolia Independent School District. The other southern half is zoned to Tomball Independent School District.
