= China Spring High School =

Coordinates: 31.6296°N 97.2877°W

Location
- 7301 N River Crossing; China Spring, Texas 76633; United States

Information
- School type: Public high school
- School district: China Spring Independent School District
- Principal: Mr. David Ellis
- Teaching staff: 67.65 (on an FTE basis)
- Grades: 9-12
- Enrollment: 959 (2024-2025)
- Student to teacher ratio: 14.18
- Colors: Columbia Blue, Navy & White
- Athletics conference: UIL Class AAAA
- Mascot: Cougar/Lady Cougar
- Yearbook: Cougar
- Website: China Spring High School

China Spring High School is a public high school located in the unincorporated community of China Spring, Texas (USA). It is part of the China Spring Independent School District located in the China Spring area of McLennan County, northwest of Waco and classified as a 4A school by the UIL. In 2015, the school was rated "Met Standard" by the Texas Education Agency. It is rated a 7/10 on the Great Schools website.

== Athletics ==
The China Spring Cougars compete in cross country, volleyball, football, basketball, powerlifting, soccer, golf, tennis, track, softball, and baseball.

=== State titles ===
- Baseball
  - 1987(2A), 1989(2A), 1993(2A), 2000(3A), 2023(4A)
- Girls basketball
  - 2006(3A)
- Football
  - 1978(1A), 2022(4A/D2), 2023(4A/D1)
- Boys golf
  - 1984(3A), 1985(3A), 1987(2A), 1988(2A), 1989(2A)
- Girls golf
  - 1993(2A), 1994(3A), 1997(3A), 1998(3A)
- Powerlifting
  - 2002(3A/D2)

==== State finalists ====
- Football
  - 1979(1A), 2007(3A/D2),
- Softball
  - 1998(3A), 2010(3A)
- Marching band
  - 1991(2A), 1993(2A), 2012(3A), 2016(4A), 2020(4A), 2021(4A), 2022(4A), 2023 (4A)

== Alumni ==
- Shawn Bell Baylor quarterback and college football coach
- Kyle Nelson NFL longsnapper
- Nate Self US Army officer, Silver Star, Bronze Star, and Purple Heart recipient, and author
