= Pinehurst, Texas =

Pinehurst is the name of some places in the U.S. state of Texas:

- Pinehurst, Montgomery County, Texas
- Pinehurst, Orange County, Texas
