= Kyle Nelson (gridiron football) =

American gridiron football player (born 1986)

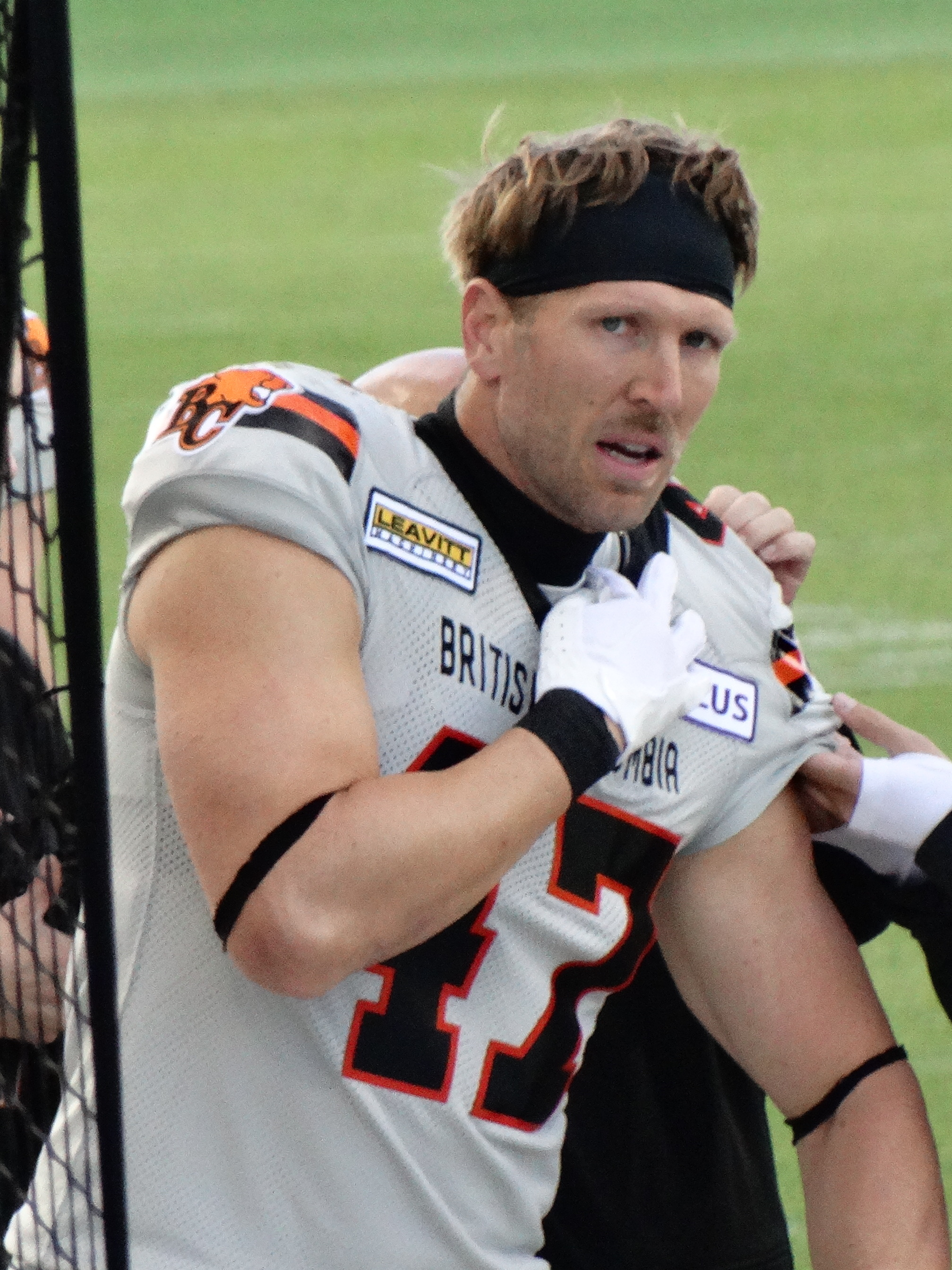
- Nelson with the BC Lions in 2024

Profile
- Position: Long snapper

Personal information
- Born: October 3, 1986 (age 40); Norman, Oklahoma, U.S.
- Listed height: 6 ft 2 in (1.88 m)
- Listed weight: 240 lb (109 kg)

Career information
- High school: China Spring (China Spring, Texas)
- College: New Mexico State
- NFL draft: 2011: undrafted

Career history
- New Orleans Saints (2011)*; Kansas City Chiefs (2011)*; Omaha Nighthawks (2011); San Francisco 49ers (2012)*; Philadelphia Eagles (2012)*; San Diego Chargers (2012); San Francisco 49ers (2013)*; Seattle Seahawks (2013)*; Washington Redskins (2013); San Francisco 49ers (2014–2020); Arizona Cardinals (2021)*; Indianapolis Colts (2021); Los Angeles Rams (2022)*; BC Lions (2024–2025)
- * Offseason or practice squad member only

Career NFL statistics
- Games played: 107
- Total tackles: 17
- Fumble recoveries: 1
- Stats at Pro Football Reference

Kyle Nelson (born October 3, 1986) is an American–Canadian professional football long snapper. He played college football at New Mexico State University. He was signed by the New Orleans Saints as an undrafted free agent in 2011.

== Early life ==
He attended China Spring High School for his senior year where he started at tight end and was the team's long snapper on special teams.

== College career ==
He played College football at New Mexico State as the backup Tight end, Fullback and Long snapper.

== Professional career ==
=== New Orleans Saints ===
On July 27, 2011, he signed with the New Orleans Saints as an undrafted free agent. On September 3, 2011, he was released. On September 4, he was signed to the practice squad. On September 5, he was released from the practice squad.

=== Kansas City Chiefs ===
On September 7, 2011, he signed with the Kansas City Chiefs to join the practice squad.

=== San Francisco 49ers (first stint) ===
On January 11, 2012, he was signed to a future contract. On September 1, 2012, he was released.

=== Philadelphia Eagles ===
On September 25, 2012, he signed with the Philadelphia Eagles to join the practice squad. On October 2, 2012, he was released from the practice squad.

=== San Diego Chargers ===
On November 20, 2012, he was signed after the team placed Long snapper Mike Windt on the season-ending Injured Reserve due to a wrist injury. During the 2012 season with the Chargers he appeared in six games. He was released from the Chargers in May 2013.

=== San Francisco 49ers (second stint) ===
On May 22, 2013, it was announced Nelson was signed to 49ers for a second stint to compete with Brian Jennings for the Long snapper position. He was later released on July 10, 2013.

=== Seattle Seahawks ===
On July 11, 2013, Nelson was claimed off waivers by the Seattle Seahawks after releasing Wide receiver Charly Martin. On August 26, 2013, he was cut by the Seahawks.

=== Washington Redskins ===
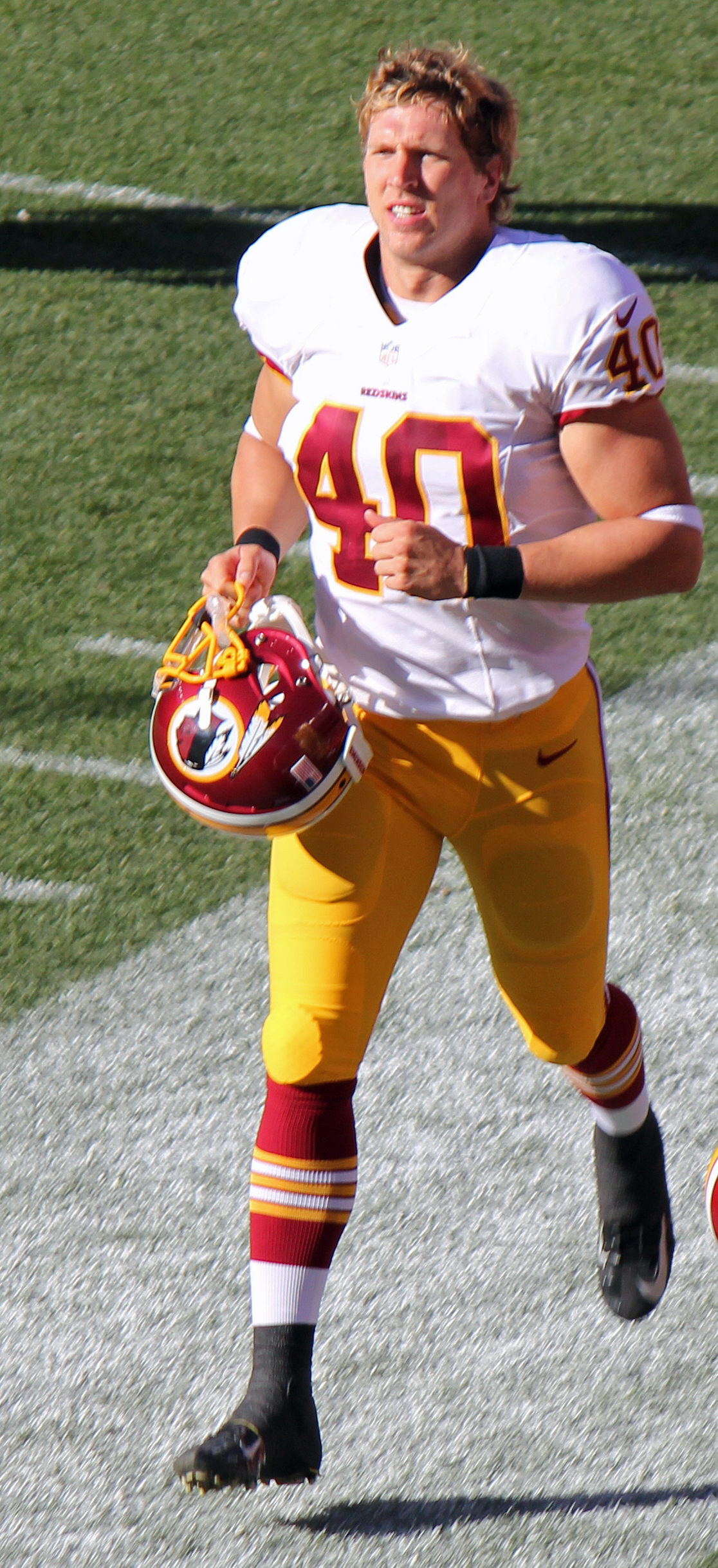
Nelson with the Washington Redskins in 2013

The Washington Redskins signed Nelson on October 15, 2013, to replace Nick Sundberg, who was put on injured reserve. The Redskins waived him on July 21, 2014.

=== San Francisco 49ers (third stint) ===
On July 25, 2014, Nelson re-signed with the 49ers on a one-year deal. The 49ers signed him to a four-year contract extension on March 6, 2015. On December 4, 2018, Nelson was suspended 10 games for using performance-enhancing substances. He missed the final four games of the season and the suspension carried over to the 2019 season.

On March 12, 2019, Nelson signed a four-year contract extension with the 49ers. After missing the first six games of the 2019 season, he was reinstated from suspension on October 21, 2019, and was activated on October 26. The 49ers reached Super Bowl LIV, but they lost 31–20 to the Kansas City Chiefs.

On September 30, 2020, Nelson was released from the 49ers.

=== Arizona Cardinals ===
On November 10, 2021, Nelson was signed to the Arizona Cardinals practice squad. He was released on November 30.

=== Indianapolis Colts ===
On December 31, 2021, Nelson was signed to the Indianapolis Colts practice squad. He played in one game for the Colts during the 2021 season. He was released on January 3, 2022.

=== Los Angeles Rams ===
On October 14, 2022, Nelson signed with the practice squad of the Los Angeles Rams. He was terminated from his practice squad contract three days later.

=== BC Lions ===
On May 2, 2024, it was announced that Nelson had signed with the BC Lions. On February 10, 2026, Nelson became a free agent at the conclusion of his contract with the Lions.

== Personal life ==
His grandfather Roger Nelson was selected in the 14th round, 164 overall in the 1954 NFL draft by the Washington Redskins but played 13 years in the Canadian Football League for the Edmonton Eskimos. His father, Mark Nelson, also played seven years in the Canadian Football League, and is currently the special team coordinator of the Toronto Argonauts.
