= China Spring Independent School District =

School district in Texas

Coordinates: 31.6331°N 97.2834°W

China Spring Independent School District is a public school district based in the community of China Spring, Texas (USA).

Located in McLennan County, a small portion of the district extends into Bosque County.

The district includes China Spring and sections of Waco.

In 2009, the school district was rated "recognized" by the Texas Education Agency.

== Schools ==
- China Spring High (grades 9-12)
- China Spring Middle (grades 7-8)
- China Spring Intermediate (grades 5-6)
- China Spring Elementary (grades 2-4)
- China Spring Primary (grades PK-1)

== Extracurricular activities ==
China Spring High School won the UIL State Football Championship in 1978 as a 1A high school led by Coach Jim Ed Bird beating Lexington 42-3. The next year, the football team played Hull-Daisetta in the state championship game, losing 28-18. The football team went to the state championship game again in 2007 as a 3A high school, but lost 14-21 to the Celina Bobcats. On December 17, 2021, the China Spring Cougar football team won their 2nd state title in program history.

The baseball team won the state championship in 2000 as a 3A school, while winning the state championship in 1987, 1989 and 1993 as a 2A school.

The girls basketball team won the state championship in 2006.

The band has a 27-year streak of getting sweepstakes at UIL marching, concert, and sightreading. The Cougar band has also been to the UIL state marching contest in 1991 (finalist), 1993 (finalist), 1994, 2000, 2002, 2008, 2010, 2012 (finalist), and 2016 (finalist). The Cougar band was also named 2016 TMEA 4A honor band.

== State championships ==
•Football—1978 (B), 2021 (4A-D2), 2022 (4A-D1)

•Baseball—1987 (2A), 1989 (2A), 1993 (2A), 2000 (3A), 2023 (4A)

•Women's basketball—2006 (3A)

•Women's golf—1991 (2A), 1992 (2A)
