= Pinehurst, Montgomery County, Texas =

Pinehurst, Texas
- Census designated place
- Location of Pinehurst, Texas
- Country: United States
- State: Texas
- County: Montgomery

Area
  - Total: 9.0 sq mi (23 km^{2})
  - Land: 9.0 sq mi (23 km^{2})
  - Water: 0 sq mi (0 km^{2})

Population (2020)
  - Total: 5,195
  - Density: 580/sq mi (220/km^{2})
- Time zone: UTC-6 (Central (CST))
  - Summer (DST): UTC-5 (CDT)

Pinehurst is a census-designated place (CDP) in Montgomery County, Texas, United States. The population was 5,195 at the 2020 census.

== Geography ==
Pinehurst is located at 30°10′43″N 95°41′47″W (30.178614, -95.696303).

According to the United States Census Bureau, the CDP has a total area of 9.0 square miles (23.4 km^{2}), all land.

== History ==
A post office was first established in the area in 1860 under the name, "Prairie Home." In 1871, its name was changed to Hunter's Retreat. In 1904, after the railroad was built, the town's name was changed to Pinehurst.

== Demographics ==
Historical population
Census	Pop.	Note	%±
1990	3,284		—
2000	4,266		29.9%
2010	4,624		8.4%
2020	5,195		12.3%
U.S. Decennial Census; 1850–1900 1910; 1920 1930 1940; 1950 1960 1970; 1980 1990 2000; 2010 2020

Pinehurst first appeared as a census designated place in the 1990 U.S. census.

=== 2020 census ===
Pinehurst CDP, Texas – Racial and ethnic composition Note: the US Census treats Hispanic/Latino as an ethnic category. This table excludes Latinos from the racial categories and assigns them to a separate category. Hispanics/Latinos may be of any race.
Race / Ethnicity (NH = Non-Hispanic)	Pop 2000	Pop 2010	Pop 2020	% 2000	% 2010	% 2020
White alone (NH)	3,716	3,106	2,635	87.11%	67.17%	50.72%
Black or African American alone (NH)	37	61	81	0.87%	1.32%	1.56%
Native American or Alaska Native alone (NH)	26	19	10	0.61%	0.41%	0.19%
Asian alone (NH)	8	9	7	0.19%	0.19%	0.13%
Native Hawaiian or Pacific Islander alone (NH)	0	0	2	0.00%	0.00%	0.04%
Other race alone (NH)	4	5	13	0.09%	0.11%	0.25%
Mixed race or Multiracial (NH)	36	44	122	0.84%	0.95%	2.35%
Hispanic or Latino (any race)	439	1,380	2,325	10.29%	29.84%	44.75%
Total	4,266	4,624	5,195	100.00%	100.00%	100.00%

As of the 2020 United States census, there were 5,195 people, 1,470 households, and 1,230 families residing in the CDP.

As of the 2010 United States census, there were 4,624 people, 1,542 households, and 1,208 families residing in the CDP. The racial makeup of the CDP was 81.5% White, 1.4% African American, 1.5% Native American, 0.2% Asian, 12.9% from other races, and 2.4% from two or more races. Hispanic or Latino of any race were 29.8% of the population.

There were 1,542 households, out of which 33.7% had children under the age of 18 living with them, 61.3% were married couples living together, 11.3% had a female householder with no husband present, and 21.7% were non-families. 17.2% of all households were made up of individuals. The average household size was 3.00 and the average family size was 3.37.

In the CDP, the population was spread out, with 27.6% under the age of 18, 9.1% from 18 to 24, 24.5% from 25 to 44, 28.1% from 45 to 64, and 10.4% who were 65 years of age or older. The median age was 36.9 years. For every 100 females, there were 101.7 males. For every 100 females age 18 and over, there were 99.5 males.

As of the 2015 American Community Survey, The median income for a household in the CDP was $46,690, and the median income for a family was $51,817. Males had a median income of $35,344 versus $15,380 for females. The per capita income for the CDP was $20,124. About 24.2% of families and 30.5% of the population were below the poverty line, including 51.9% of those under age 18 and 0.0% of those age 65 or over.

== Government ==
Census-designated places like Pinehurst are not official locations beyond their use by the Census Bureau, and therefore do not have their own municipal government. All local governance of the CDP is instead administered by Montgomery County, Precinct 2. The current commissioner is Charlie Riley.

In the Texas Senate, Pinehurst is in District 4, represented by Republican Brandon Creighton. In the Texas House of Representatives, Pinehurst is in District 3, represented by Republican Cecil Bell Jr.

In the United States Senate, Republicans John Cornyn and Ted Cruz represent the entire state of Texas. In the United States House of Representatives, Pinehurst is in District 8, represented by Republican Kevin Brady.

The United States Postal Service operates a post office in Pinehurst on Wright Road next to SH 249.

== Education ==
Pinehurst is within the Magnolia Independent School District and Tomball Independent School District.

Pinehurst students zoned to Magnolia ISD will attend the following schools:

- Depending on their address, K-5th grade students will attend either Williams Elementary School, Magnolia Elementary School, or Lyon Elementary School.
- 6th grade students attend Magnolia 6th Grade Campus.
- 7-8th grade students attend Magnolia Junior High School.
- 9-12th grade students attend Magnolia West High School.

Pinehurst students zoned to Tomball ISD will attend the following schools:

- K-4th grade students attend Decker Prairie Elementary School.
- 5-6th grade students attend Tomball Intermediate School.
- 7-8th grade students attend Tomball Junior High School.
- 9-12th grade students attend Tomball High School.

Residents of both Tomball ISD and Magnolia ISD (and therefore Pinehurst) are served by the Lone Star College System (formerly North Harris Montgomery Community College).
