= Magnolia High School (Texas) =

Coordinates: 30.2276°N 95.6872°W

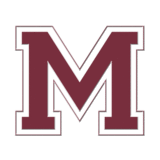

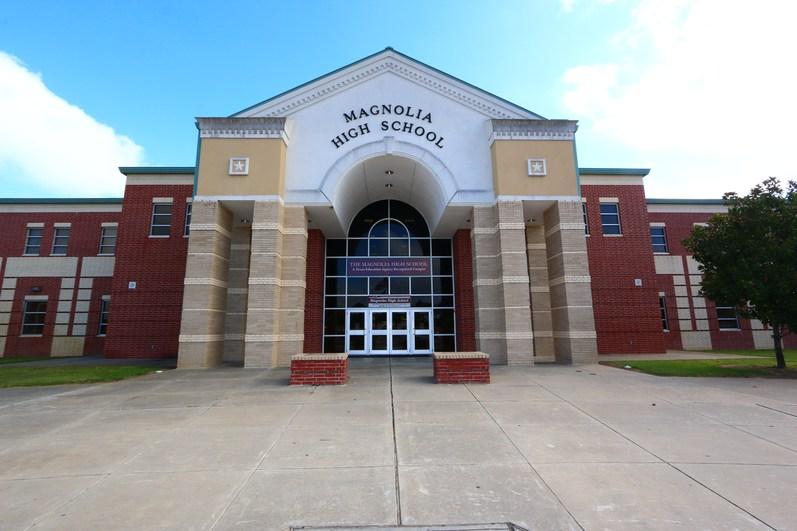
- 14350 Farm to Market Rd 1488Magnolia, Texas 77354; United States

Information
- School type: Public High School
- Established: 1912
- School district: Magnolia Independent School District
- Principal: John Allbritton
- Faculty: 132.58 (on an FTE basis)
- Grades: 9–12
- Enrollment: 2,258 (2023-2024)
- Student to teacher ratio: 17.03
- Colors: Maroon & White
- Athletics conference: UIL Class AAAAAA
- Mascot: Bulldogs/Lady Bulldogs
- Website: Magnolia High School

Magnolia High School (MHS) is one of two public high schools in the Magnolia Independent School District in Magnolia, Texas, United States.

For 2018–19, the school received a score of 89 out of 100 from the Texas Education Agency.

== Demographics ==
In the 2018–2019 school year, there were 2,005 students enrolled at Magnolia High School. The ethnic distribution of students was as follows:

- 3.1% African American
- 1.6% Asian
- 27.2% Hispanic
- 0.2% American Indian
- 65.4% White
- 2.4% Two or More Races

27.9% of students were eligible for free or reduced-price lunch.

== Academics ==
For each school year, the Texas Education Agency rates school performance using an A–F grading system based on statistical data. For 2018–2019, the school received a score of 89 out of 100, resulting in a B grade. The school received the same score the previous year.

== Athletics ==
Magnolia High School offers a number of athletic programs, including Cross Country, Football, Team Tennis, Golf, Volleyball, Basketball, Soccer, Powerlifting, Swimming & Diving, Baseball, Track, Marching Band, and Softball.

== Notable alumni ==
- Buddy Dial – former Pittsburgh Steelers wide receiver and College Football Hall of Fame inductee
- Jordan Groshans – professional baseball player
- Adam Kloffenstein – professional baseball player
