= Magnolia Independent School District =

School district in Texas, United States

Address
- 31141 Nichols Sawmill Road Magnolia, Texas, 77355; United States

District information
- Type: Public
- Motto: Dedicated to be the best district in the state of Texas
- Grades: PK–12
- Established: March 20, 1950; 76 years ago
- Superintendent: Todd Stephens
- Governing agency: Texas Education Agency
- Schools: 17
- NCES District ID: 4828740

Students and staff
- Enrollment: 13,264 (2018–2019)
- Teachers: 819.16 (on an FTE basis)
- Staff: 680.82 (on an FTE basis)
- Student–teacher ratio: 16.19

Other information
- Website: www.magnoliaisd.org

Magnolia Independent School District is a public school district based in Magnolia, Texas, United States. In addition to Magnolia, the district also serves the town of Stagecoach and the community of Pinehurst.

For the 2018–19 school year, the district received a score of 87 out of 100 from the Texas Education Agency.

== History ==
The four earliest schools in the Magnolia area began between 1886–1889 and were known as the "Methodist school," the "Grange School," the "Baptist school," and the "Steger School." These schools were combined in 1893 under the Grange School name. In the early 1900s, Common School District #6 was created to oversee the education of students in the area. A new building was constructed to serve as the area school, opening its doors in January 1912. The building was burnt in a September 1926 fire, but was rebuilt in 1927. A new brick structure was built to replace the previous school, opening in 1936. Owing to segregation, African American high school students during this period were sent to school in Montgomery, while students up to grade 7 attended one of two black schools. In 1939, African American students up to grade 7 were moved into a new building, the George W. Carver School. In 1947, taxpayers approved a bond to construct a school for junior high and high school white students, converting the previous school into an elementary campus.

On March 20, 1950, the community voted to convert the Magnolia Common District #6 into Magnolia Independent School District. Beginning in 1957, the Carver school began teaching high school African American students, adding one grade level per year to reduce the number of students transported to Montgomery. In accordance with nation-wide desegregation, the district in 1965 offered students the option to transfer schools. Since no students or teachers voluntarily transferred, the district moved two Carver School teachers to the white elementary campus in order to comply with federal law. In 1967, Magnolia ISD schools were fully desegregated, with the Carver School converted into an intermediate level campus.

Beginning in the 1970s, the construction of The Woodlands accelerated population growth in Magnolia ISD's attendance area. The district built the current Magnolia Elementary School campus in 1970–1971 and built a new high school building in 1976. In 1982, the district built Bear Branch Elementary school on the eastern edge of the district, followed by Lyon Elementary in 1993 and Bear Branch Junior High School in 1996. Population growth accelerated in the 2000s, spurring the construction of several new campuses, including 4 elementary schools, 2 sixth grade campuses, the relocation of Bear Branch Elementary and Magnolia Junior High, the construction of the current Magnolia High School campus in 2001 and Magnolia West High School in 2006.

== Hair length policy and lawsuit ==
The district has a policy requiring boys to have short hair, and has imposed in-school suspensions and temporary transfers to an alternative school against students with hair longer than permitted by the district. Several boys and a nonbinary student affected by the policy, represented by the American Civil Liberties Union, have sued the district over the policy, saying that the punishments have caused them "immense and irreparable harm."

== Schools ==
=== High Schools (Grades 9-12) ===
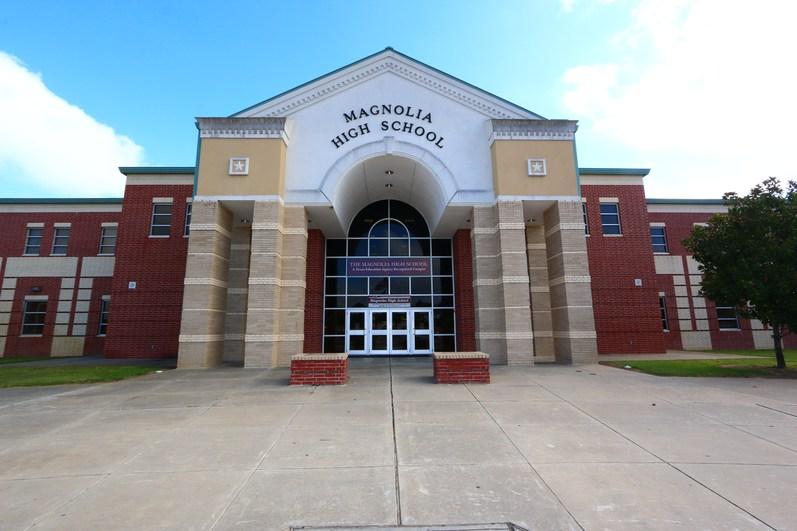
Magnolia High School.

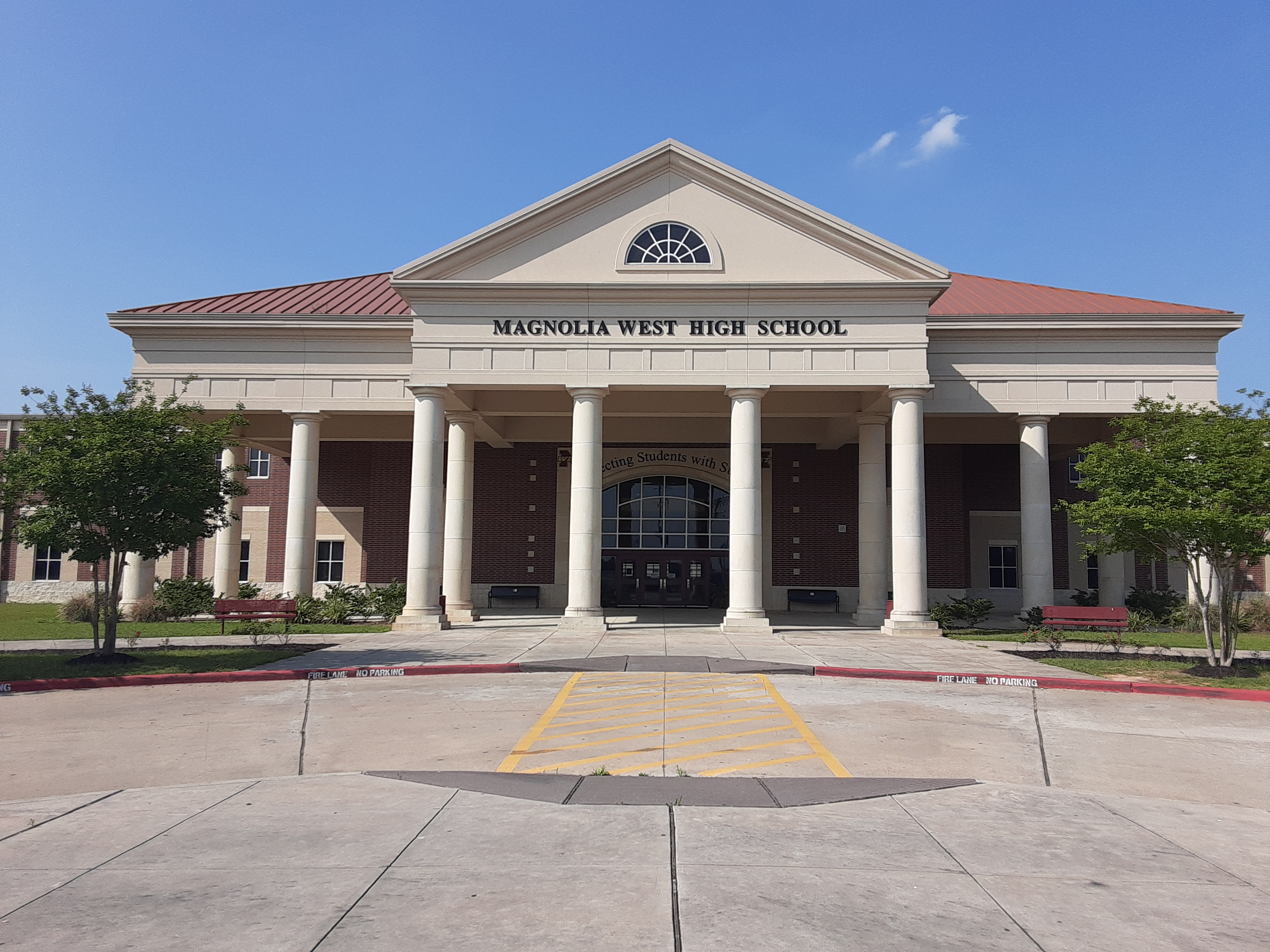
Magnolia West High School

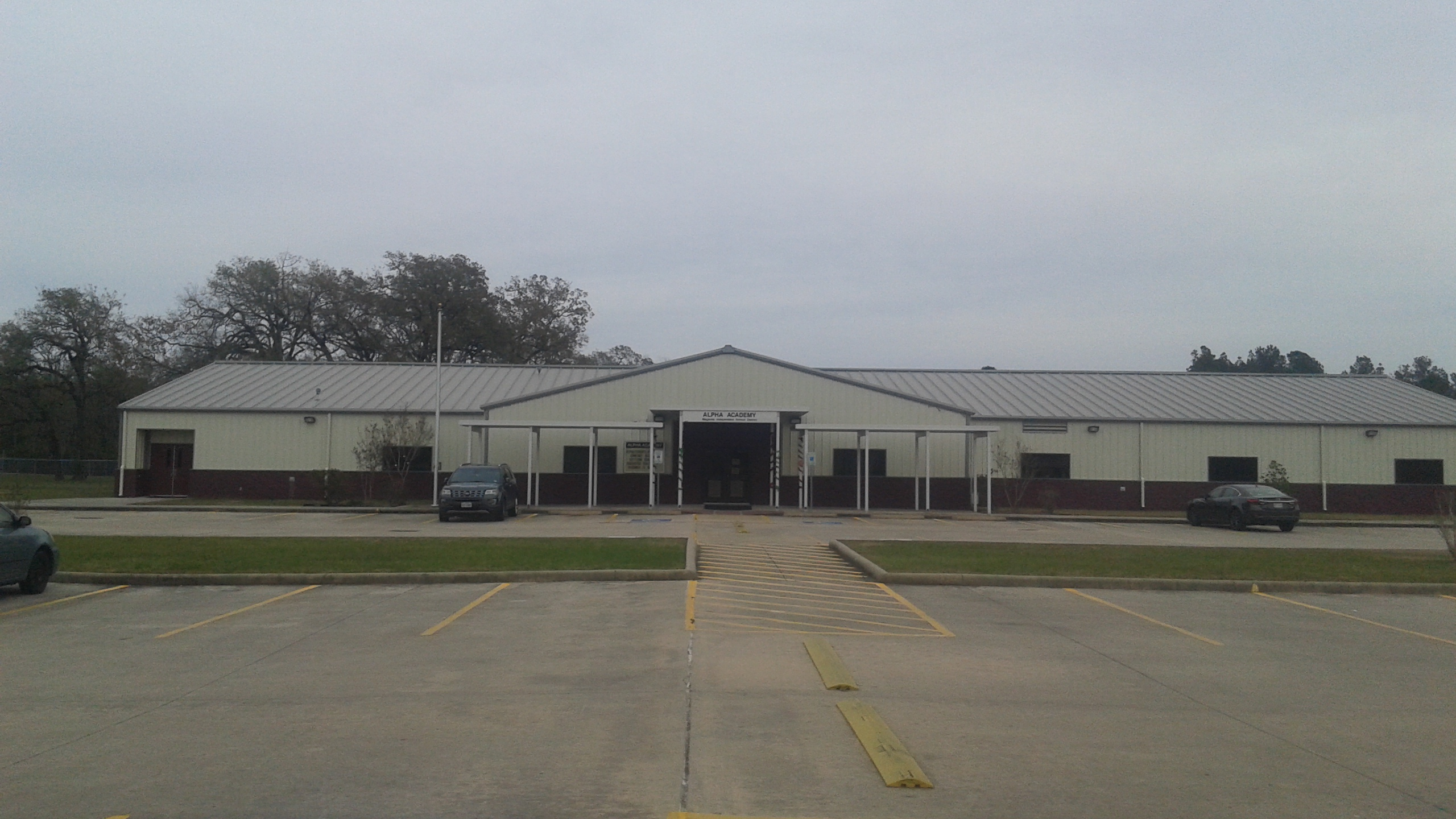
ALPHA Academy

- Magnolia High School (Mascot: Bulldogs)
- Magnolia West High School (Mascot: Mustangs)
- ALPHA Academy (Mascot: Jaguars)

=== Junior High Schools (Grades 7–8) ===
- Bear Branch Junior High School
- Magnolia Junior High School
- Magnolia Parkway Junior High School

=== Intermediate Schools (Grades 5–6) ===
- Bear Branch Intermediate School
- Magnolia Intermediate School
- Magnolia Parkway Intermediate School

=== Elementary Schools (Grades PK/K-4) ===
- Bear Branch Elementary School
- Ellisor Elementary School
- Lyon Elementary School
- Magnolia Elementary School
- Magnolia Parkway Elementary School
- Nichols Sawmill Elementary School
- Smith Elementary School
- Williams Elementary School
