= Magnolia West High School =

Public high school in Magnolia, Texas

Coordinates: 30.2215°N 95.7666°W

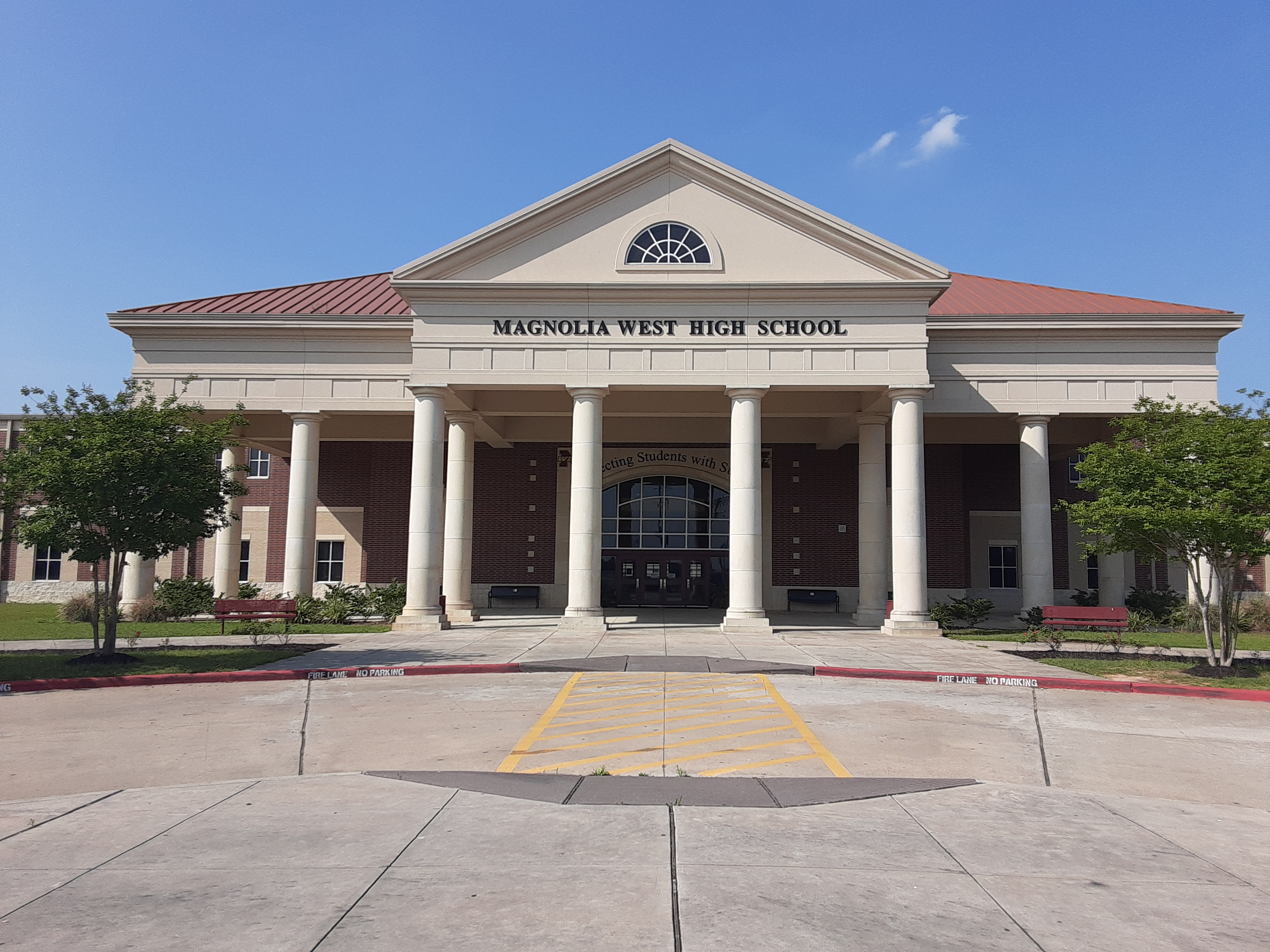

Location
- 42202 FM 1774; Magnolia, Texas 77354

Information
- School type: Public, high school
- Founded: 2006
- School district: Magnolia
- Principal: Jason Morley
- Teaching staff: 151.76 (on an FTE basis)
- Grades: 9–12
- Enrollment: 2,325 (2023–2024)
- Student to teacher ratio: 15.32
- Language: English
- Campus: Rural: Fringe
- Colors: Maroon and gold
- Mascot: Mustang
- Website: mwhs.magnoliaisd.org

Magnolia West High School (MWHS) is one of two public high schools in the Magnolia Independent School District in Magnolia, Texas, United States.

== Description ==
Located in Magnolia, Texas, an exurb of Houston, the school opened in August 2006 in order to relieve crowding at Magnolia High School. MWHS served grades 9 and 10 in the 2007–08 school year and grades 9 through 12 in the 2009–10 school year.

== Demographics ==
In the 2018–19 school year, there were 2,041 students enrolled at Magnolia West High School. The ethnic distribution of students was as follows:

- 2.1% African American
- 0.6% Asian
- 34.3% Hispanic
- 0.8% American Indian
- 0.1% Pacific Islander
- 60.8% White
- 1.4% Two or More Races

47.3% of students were eligible for free or reduced-price lunch.

== Academics ==
For each school year, the Texas Education Agency rates school performance using an A–F grading system based on statistical data. For 2018–19, the school received a score of 86 out of 100, resulting in a B grade. The school received a score of 83 the previous year.

== Athletics ==
MWHS offers a number of athletic programs, including football, basketball, soccer, baseball, volleyball, softball, track and field, cross country, swim, tennis, athletic training, cheerleading, dance, and golf. They also have a marching band. The school teams are known as the Mustangs and the school colors are maroon and gold.

== Clubs and activities ==
Magnolia West High School's clubs include Academic Decathlon, anime club, creative writing club, debate, DECA, DIY Club, FCCLA, Fellowship of Christian Athletes, Future Farmers of America, French club, Interact club, game club, and ping pong club.

== Notable alumni ==
- Trevor Stephan, baseball pitcher for the Cleveland Guardians of the MLB
- John Matocha, American football quarterback for the Colorado Mines Orediggers and 2022 Harlon Hill Trophy recipient.
