= Magnolia, Texas =

- City
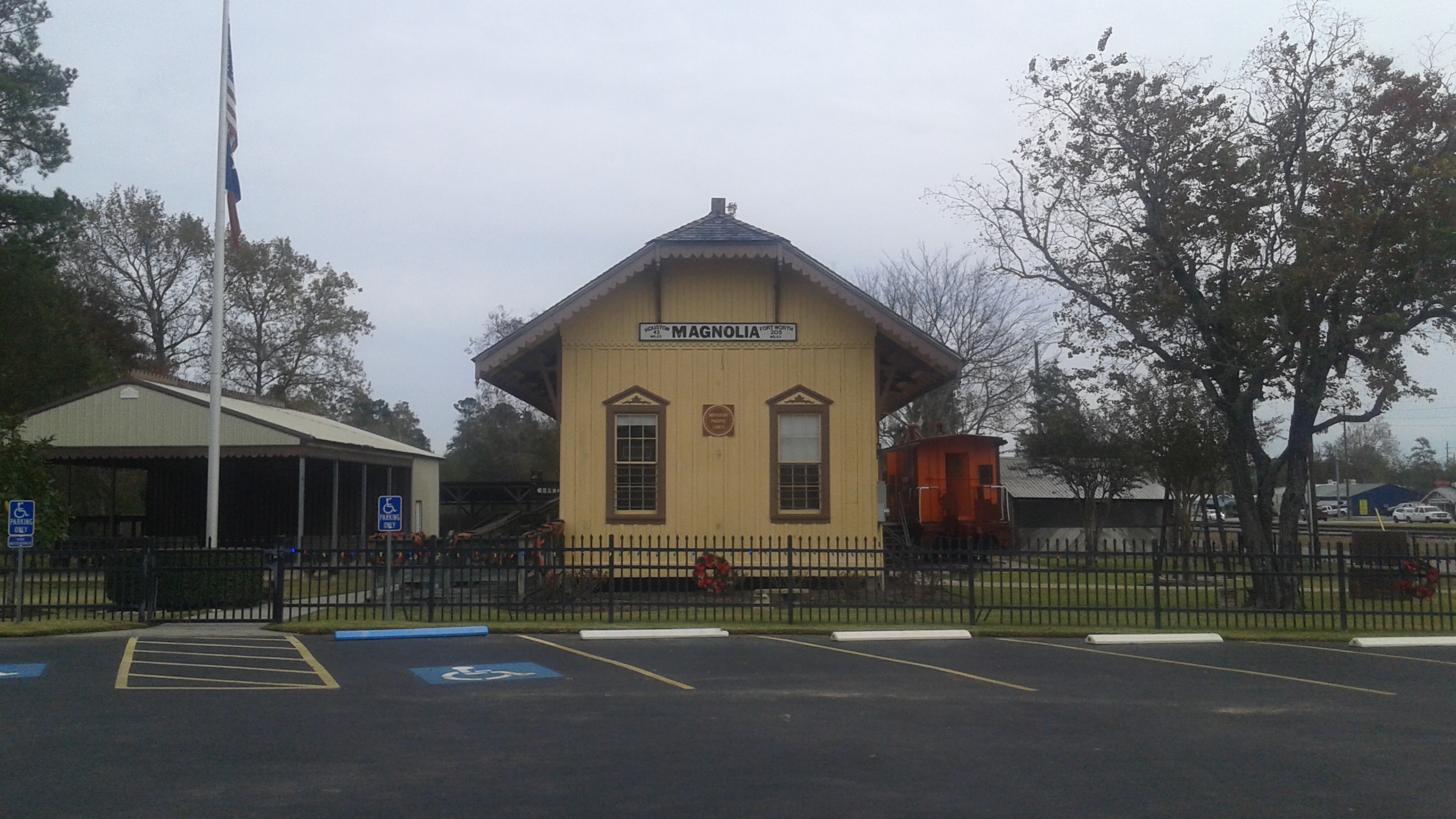
- Historic train depot in downtown Magnolia
- Nickname: Home of Red
- Location of Magnolia, Texas
- Coordinates: 30°12′34″N 95°45′03″W
- Country: United States
- State: Texas
- County: Montgomery
- Founded: 1845 (as Mink's Prairie)
- Incorporated: October 15, 1968

Government
  - Type: General Law Type A
  - Mayor: Christopher L. "Chris" Blair
  - Mayor Pro Tem: Buck Perino
  - Councilmembers: Buck Perino; Caleb Small; Geoff Beyer; Brandon Jacobs; Raymond K. Gaskin, III

Area
  - Total: 4.865 sq mi (12.600 km^{2})
  - Land: 4.844 sq mi (12.547 km^{2})
  - Water: 0.020 sq mi (0.053 km^{2})
- Elevation: 272 ft (83 m)

Population (2020)
  - Total: 2,359
  - Estimate (2025): 8,095
  - Density: 1,100/sq mi (424/km^{2})
- Time zone: UTC–6 (Central (CST))
  - Summer (DST): UTC–5 (CDT)
- ZIP Codes: 77353, 77354, 77355
- Area codes: 713, 281, 832, 346, 621
- FIPS code: 48-46056
- GNIS feature ID: 1340838
- Sales tax: 8.25%
- Website: cityofmagnolia.com

Magnolia is a city in southwestern Montgomery County, Texas, United States within the Houston metropolitan area. As of the 2020 census, its population was 2,359. It is named for the magnolia trees that grow in the area.

== History ==
The first settlement in the Magnolia area was a town named Mink Prairie, founded in about 1845 when a farmer named Mink built a homestead. By 1850, the town's name was shortened to Mink. After the Civil War, Mink's population swelled due to an influx of settlers from Kentucky and Tennessee, resulting in a post office being built in 1885. In 1902, the International-Great Northern Railroad (now operated by Union Pacific), decided to build a railroad to the north of Mink, causing most of the residents of Mink to move closer to the railroad line. The new town was named Melton in honor of a wealthy landowner who lived in the area. However, the postal service kept confusing the name with a different town called "Milton," prompting local officials to change the name to Magnolia. In 1903, the Mink post office moved to the new town of Magnolia, as the old town of Mink would soon become abandoned.

== Geography ==
According to the United States Census Bureau, the city has a total area of 4.865 square miles (12.60 km^{2}), of which 4.845 square miles (12.55 km^{2}) is land and 0.020 square miles (0.05 km^{2}) is water.

=== Climate ===
The climate in this area is characterized by hot, humid summers and generally mild to cool winters. According to the Köppen Climate Classification system, Magnolia has a humid subtropical climate, abbreviated "Cfa" on climate maps.

Climate data for David Wayne Hooks Memorial Airport near Tomball, Texas, 1981–2010 normals, (Note: Mean monthly maxima and minima (i.e. the highest and lowest temperature readings during an entire month or year) calculated based on data at said location from 1981 to 2010.) extremes 1888–present (Note: Official records for the entire Houston area were kept at the Weather Bureau in downtown Houston from July 1888 to May 1969, and at George Bush Intercontinental Airport since June 1969.)
Month	Jan	Feb	Mar	Apr	May	Jun	Jul	Aug	Sep	Oct	Nov	Dec	Year
Record high °F (°C)	84 (29)	91 (33)	96 (36)	95 (35)	99 (37)	107 (42)	105 (41)	109 (43)	109 (43)	99 (37)	89 (32)	85 (29)	109 (43)
Mean daily maximum °F (°C)	61.5 (16.4)	65.6 (18.7)	72.1 (22.3)	78.7 (25.9)	85.7 (29.8)	90.4 (32.4)	93.1 (33.9)	93.8 (34.3)	89.2 (31.8)	82.6 (28.1)	71.7 (22.1)	64.5 (18.1)	79.1 (26.2)
Daily mean °F (°C)	51.5 (10.8)	55.1 (12.8)	60.8 (16.0)	67.9 (19.9)	75.8 (24.3)	80.8 (27.1)	82.1 (27.8)	82.6 (28.1)	78.0 (25.6)	70.1 (21.2)	60.0 (15.6)	52.9 (11.6)	68.2 (20.1)
Mean daily minimum °F (°C)	41.4 (5.2)	44.7 (7.1)	49.5 (9.7)	57.1 (13.9)	65.9 (18.8)	71.2 (21.8)	71.2 (21.8)	71.4 (21.9)	66.7 (19.3)	57.5 (14.2)	48.3 (9.1)	41.2 (5.1)	57.2 (14.0)
Record low °F (°C)	5 (−15)	6 (−14)	21 (−6)	31 (−1)	42 (6)	52 (11)	62 (17)	54 (12)	45 (7)	29 (−2)	19 (−7)	7 (−14)	5 (−15)
Average precipitation inches (mm)	3.55 (90)	3.03 (77)	3.59 (91)	3.39 (86)	4.77 (121)	5.22 (133)	3.84 (98)	4.70 (119)	4.57 (116)	5.30 (135)	4.72 (120)	3.80 (97)	50.48 (1,282)
Average precipitation days (≥ 0.01 in)	9	8	9	7	8	10	10	8	8	8	8	10	101
Source: NOAA (precipitation days 2000–2017 at Bush International)

== Demographics ==
Historical population
Census	Pop.	Note	%±
1970	315		—
1980	867		175.2%
1990	940		8.4%
2000	1,111		18.2%
2010	1,393		25.4%
2020	2,359		69.3%
2025 (est.)	8,095		243.2%
U.S. Decennial Census; Texas Almanac: 1850-2000; 2020 Census

As of the 2020 census, Magnolia had a population of 2,359 and a median age of 35.2 years. 27.9% of residents were under the age of 18 and 15.9% were 65 years of age or older. For every 100 females there were 89.6 males, and for every 100 females age 18 and over there were 86.5 males age 18 and over. The population density was 821.4 inhabitants per square mile (317.1/km^{2}). There were 860 households and 616 families residing in the city.

85.6% of residents lived in urban areas, while 14.4% lived in rural areas.

Of the 860 households, 40.8% had children under the age of 18 living in them, 50.0% were married-couple households, 13.4% were households with a male householder and no spouse or partner present, and 30.3% were households with a female householder and no spouse or partner present. About 23.7% of all households were made up of individuals and 13.3% had someone living alone who was 65 years of age or older.

There were 924 housing units, of which 6.9% were vacant. The homeowner vacancy rate was 2.0% and the rental vacancy rate was 6.8%.

Racial composition as of the 2020 census
Race	Number	Percent
White	1,717	72.8%
Black or African American	146	6.2%
American Indian and Alaska Native	16	0.7%
Asian	28	1.2%
Native Hawaiian and Other Pacific Islander	0	0.0%
Some other race	178	7.5%
Two or more races	274	11.6%
Hispanic or Latino (of any race)	427	18.1%

== Arts and culture ==
The Montgomery County Memorial Library System operates the Malcom Purvis Branch in the city.

== Government ==
=== Local government ===
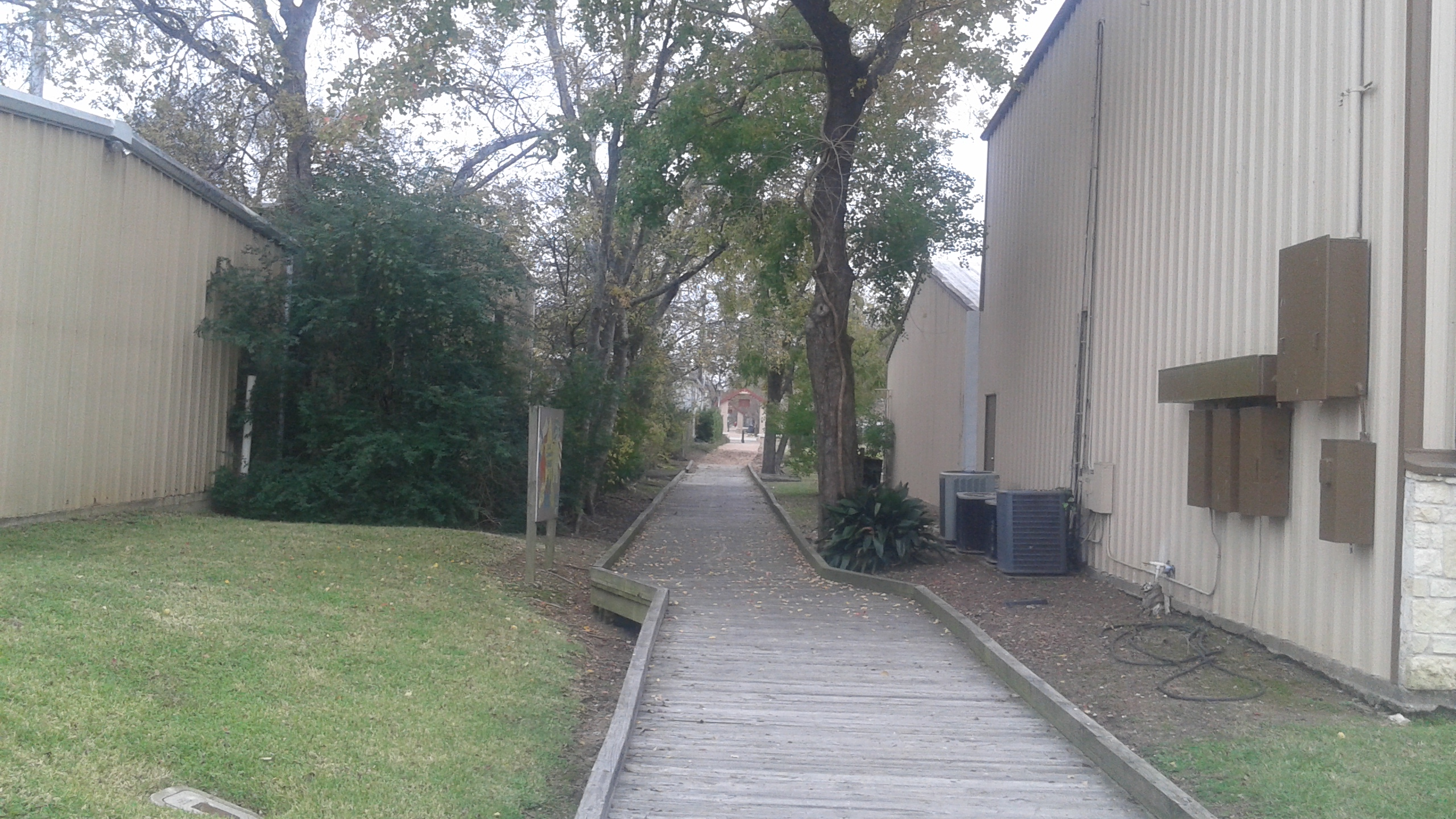
The Stroll, a half-mile walking path in downtown Magnolia.

As an incorporated city with a population of more than 5,000, Magnolia is designated as a general law city under the Constitution of Texas. It is governed at the local level by an elected mayor and five council members. As of May 2024, the mayor is Matthew "Doc" Dantzer. Council member Richard Carby also serves as mayor pro tem. The other council members are Daniel Miller, Buck Perino, Brandon Jacobs, and Jack L Huitt, Jr.

In 2011 the citizenry voted to allow the sale of alcoholic beverages. Magnolia was the last "dry" city in Montgomery County.

On April 9, 2013, the Magnolia City Council adopted a 20-year comprehensive plan entitled, "Magnolia on the Move." In the plan, the city outlines its vision for dealing with the projected business and residential growth in the area.

In 2015, the city adopted a Unified Development Code (UDC) to outline the specific steps development should take to comply with the comprehensive plan. The UDC includes specific restrictions on development, including restrictions on the height of signs, the materials used to construct buildings, and the protection of live oak and magnolia trees.

=== State government ===
In the Texas Senate, Magnolia is part of District 4, represented by Republican Brandon Creighton. In the Texas House of Representatives, Magnolia is part of District 3, represented by Cecil Bell Jr.

=== Federal government ===
In the United States Senate, Republicans John Cornyn and Ted Cruz represent the entire state of Texas. In the United States House of Representatives, Magnolia is part of District 8, represented by Republican Morgan Luttrell.

The United States Postal Service Magnolia Post Office is located at 815 Goodson Road.

== Education ==
=== Public schools ===
The city of Magnolia is part of the Magnolia Independent School District.

- Students in grades K–4 attend either Magnolia Elementary, Nichols Sawmill Elementary, Williams Elementary, or Smith Elementary.
- Students in 5th and 6th grade attend either Magnolia Intermediate or Bear Branch Intermediate.
- Students in 7th and 8th grade attend Magnolia Junior High or Bear Branch Junior High.
- Students in grades 9–12 attend Magnolia West High School or Magnolia High School, the original high school of the area.

=== Colleges and universities ===
The Texas Legislature designates Magnolia ISD (and therefore all of Magnolia) as a part of Lone Star College (originally the North Harris Montgomery Community College District). The territory in Splendora ISD joined the community college district in 2000.

== Infrastructure ==
Magnolia is located at the intersection of FM 1488 and FM 1774 (also known as Magnolia Boulevard).

== Notable people ==
- Cecil Bell Jr., Republican member of the Texas House of Representatives, District 3
- Jonathan Clay, Tony award-winning composer
- Buddy Dial, NFL wide receiver for Pittsburgh Steelers and Dallas Cowboys, played college football for Rice University
- Michael Galloway, Republican member of the Texas Senate representing District 4
- Marcus Luttrell, United States Navy war hero; his service is depicted in Lone Survivor along with other military heroes in Operation Red Wings
- Morgan Luttrell, Republican member of the United States House of Representatives, District 8
- Nick Mitchell, wrestler for WWE
- Amanda Scarborough, sports broadcaster for ESPN and former softball player at Texas A&M
- Fred Whitfield, world champion tie-down roper
