= China Spring, Texas =

Unincorporated community in Texas, US

Coordinates: 31°38′57″N 97°18′17″W

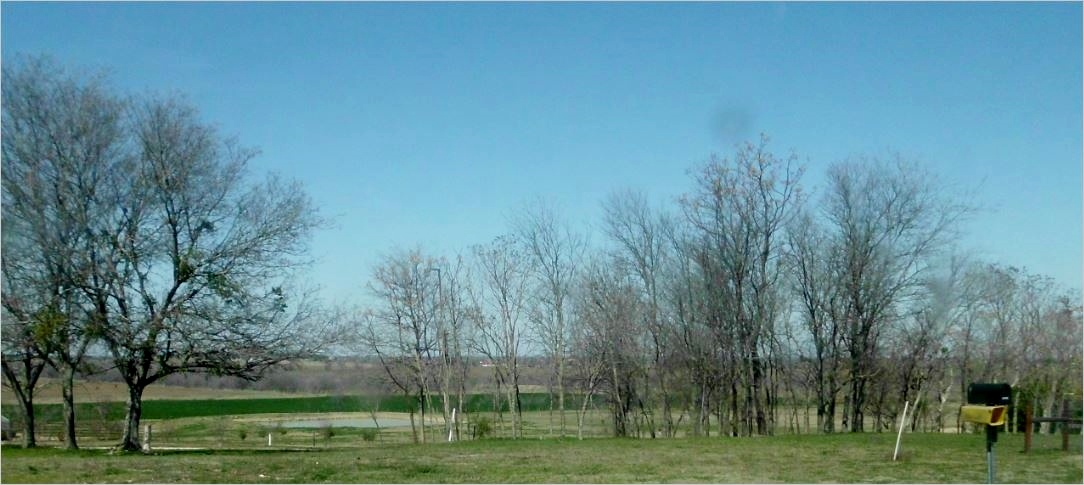
This spring is the China Spring community's namesake.

China Spring is a census-designated place in northwestern McLennan County, Texas, United States. It lies approximately twelve miles northwest of Waco, on Farm-to-Market Road 1637, and is part of the Waco Metropolitan Statistical Area. As of the 2020 census, China Spring had a population of 1,436.

== History ==
Settlement of the area began as early as 1860, and the community was founded in 1867. It was named for a spring in a chinaberry grove. A post office was established there in May 1873 with Charles S. Eichelberger as postmaster. By the early 1880s, the community had 200 residents with five steam cotton gins and gristmills, three general stores and a Methodist church. Cotton, corn, and wool were the principal products of the area.

China Spring became the focus of a rural school district in the late 1920s. Two churches, a school, and many houses marked the community on topographic maps of the mid-1970s.

== Demographics ==
Historical population
| Census | Pop. | Note | %± |
|---|---|---|---|
| 2010 | 1,281 | | — |
| 2020 | 1,436 | | 12.1% |
U.S. Decennial Census; 1850–1900 1910; 1920 1930 1940; 1950 1960 1970; 1980 1990 2000; 2010 2020

China Spring first appeared as a census designated place in the 2010 U.S. census.

China Spring CDP, Texas – Racial and ethnic composition Note: the US Census treats Hispanic/Latino as an ethnic category. This table excludes Latinos from the racial categories and assigns them to a separate category. Hispanics/Latinos may be of any race.
| Race / Ethnicity (NH = Non-Hispanic) | Pop 2010 | Pop 2020 | % 2010 | % 2020 |
|---|---|---|---|---|
| White alone (NH) | 1,067 | 1,074 | 83.29% | 74.79% |
| Black or African American alone (NH) | 10 | 18 | 0.78% | 1.25% |
| Native American or Alaska Native alone (NH) | 8 | 7 | 0.62% | 0.49% |
| Asian alone (NH) | 0 | 6 | 0.00% | 0.42% |
| Native Hawaiian or Pacific Islander alone (NH) | 0 | 0 | 0.00% | 0.00% |
| Other race alone (NH) | 0 | 2 | 0.00% | 0.14% |
| Mixed race or Multiracial (NH) | 5 | 45 | 0.39% | 3.13% |
| Hispanic or Latino (any race) | 191 | 284 | 14.91% | 19.78% |
| Total | 1,281 | 1,436 | 100.00% | 100.00% |

== Notable person ==
Musician Ted Nugent owns a ranch in the area.

== Education ==
China Spring Independent School District serves area students.
