= List of Mid-Eastern Athletic Conference football champions =

This is a list of yearly Mid-Eastern Athletic Conference football champions. Champions have been determined by the best record in play amongst teams in the conference, which can result in one or multiple champions. In 1978, the MEAC was classified as a Division I conference by the NCAA. Prior to that year, the league operated as a Division II conference.

The MEAC has seen a handful of teams forfeit the championship due to violations. The 1987 Howard Bison, who had won all five conference games under Willie Jeffries, was stripped of their championship in 1989 due to the use of ineligible players. Delaware State, who had won all but their game against Howard, was awarded the championship. Norfolk State was stripped of their 2011 title in 2016, with no champion being awarded the title retroactively. In 2019, North Carolina A&T and South Carolina State were each awarded the MEAC title after each went 6–2 in conference play over Florida A&M, who had gone 7-1 but were under sanctions due to ineligible players.

== Champions by year ==
| Year | Champions | Overall | Conference | Head coach |
|---|---|---|---|---|
| 1971 | Morgan State | 6–4–1 | 5–0–1 | Earl Banks |
| 1972 | North Carolina Central | 9–2 | 5–1 | George Quiett |
| 1973 | North Carolina Central | 7–4 | 5–1 | Willie Smith |
| 1974 | South Carolina State | 8–4 | 5–1 | Willie Jeffries |
| 1975 | North Carolina A&T | 8–3 | 5–1 | Hornsby Howell |
| 1975 | South Carolina State | 8–2–1 | 5–1 | Willie Jeffries |
| 1976 | **South Carolina State** | 10–1 | 5–1 | Willie Jeffries |
| 1976 | Morgan State | 6–4 | 5–1 | Henry Lattimore |
| 1977 | **South Carolina State** | 9–1–1 | 6–0 | Willie Jeffries |
| 1978 | South Carolina State | 8–2–1 | 5–0–1 | Willie Jeffries |
| 1979 | Morgan State | 9–2 | 5–0 | Clarence Thomas |
| 1980 | South Carolina State | 10–1 | 5–0 | Bill Davis |
| 1981 | **South Carolina State** | 10–3 | 5–0 | Bill Davis |
| 1982 | South Carolina State | 9–3 | 4–1 | Bill Davis |
| 1983 | South Carolina State | 7–3 | 4–0 | Bill Davis |
| 1984 | Bethune–Cookman | 7–3 | 4–0 | Larry Little |
| 1985 | Delaware State | 9–2 | 4–0 | Bill Collick |
| 1986 | North Carolina A&T | 9–3 | 4–1 | Mo Forte |
| 1987 | Delaware State | 9–1 | 5–0 | Bill Collick |
| 1988 | Bethune–Cookman | 5–6 | 4–2 | Larry Little |
| 1988 | Delaware State | 5–5 | 4–2 | Bill Collick |
| 1988 | Florida A&M | 6–4–1 | 4–2 | Ken Riley |
| 1989 | Delaware State | 7–4 | 5–1 | Bill Collick |
| 1990 | Florida A&M | 7–4 | 6–0 | Ken Riley |
| 1991 | North Carolina A&T | 9–3 | 5–1 | Bill Hayes |
| 1991 | Delaware State | 9–2 | 5–1 | Bill Collick |
| 1992 | North Carolina A&T | 9–3 | 5–1 | Bill Hayes |
| 1993 | **Howard** | 11–1 | 6–0 | Steve Wilson |
| 1994 | **South Carolina State** | 10–2 | 6–0 | Willie Jeffries |
| 1995 | Florida A&M | 9–3 | 6–0 | Billy Joe |
| 1996 | Florida A&M | 9–3 | 7–0 | Billy Joe |
| 1997 | **Hampton** | 10–2 | 7–0 | Joe Taylor |
| 1998 | **Florida A&M** | 11–2 | 7–1 | Billy Joe |
| 1998 | Hampton | 9–3 | 7–1 | Joe Taylor |
| 1999 | **North Carolina A&T** | 11–2 | 8–0 | Bill Hayes |
| 2000 | Florida A&M | 9–3 | 7–1 | Billy Joe |
| 2001 | **Florida A&M** | 7–4 | 7–1 | Billy Joe |
| 2002 | Bethune–Cookman | 11–2 | 7–1 | Alvin Wyatt |
| 2003 | North Carolina A&T | 10–3 | 6–1 | George Small |
| 2004 | **Hampton** | 10–2 | 6–1 | Joe Taylor |
| 2004 | South Carolina State | 9–2 | 6–1 | Oliver Pough |
| 2005 | **Hampton** | 11–1 | 8–0 | Joe Taylor |
| 2006 | **Hampton** | 10–2 | 7–1 | Joe Taylor |
| 2007 | **Delaware State** | 10–2 | 9–0 | Al Lavan |
| 2008 | South Carolina State | 10–3 | 8–0 | Oliver Pough |
| 2009 | **South Carolina State** | 10–2 | 8–0 | Oliver Pough |
| 2010 | **Bethune–Cookman** | 10–2 | 7–1 | Brian Jenkins |
| 2010 | South Carolina State | 9–3 | 7–1 | Oliver Pough |
| 2010 | Florida A&M† | 8–3 | 7–1 | Joe Taylor |
| 2011 | Norfolk State† | 9–3 | 7–1 | Pete Adrian |
| 2012 | Bethune–Cookman | 9–3 | 8–0 | Brian Jenkins |
| 2013 | **Bethune–Cookman** | 10–3 | 7–1 | Brian Jenkins |
| 2013 | South Carolina State | 9–4 | 7–1 | Oliver Pough |
| 2014 | Bethune–Cookman | 9–3 | 6–2 | Brian Jenkins |
| 2014 | Morgan State | 7–6 | 6–2 | Lee Hull |
| 2014 | North Carolina A&T | 9–3 | 6–2 | Rod Broadway |
| 2014 | North Carolina Central | 7–5 | 6–2 | Jerry Mack |
| 2014 | South Carolina State | 8–4 | 6–2 | Oliver Pough |
| 2015 | Bethune–Cookman | 9–2 | 7–1 | Terry Sims |
| 2015 | **North Carolina A&T** | 10–2 | 7–1 | Rod Broadway |
| 2015 | North Carolina Central | 8–3 | 7–1 | Jerry Mack |
| 2016 | North Carolina Central | 9–3 | 8–0 | Jerry Mack |
| 2017 | **North Carolina A&T** | 12–0 | 8–0 | Rod Broadway |
| 2018 | **North Carolina A&T** | 10–2 | 6–1 | Sam Washington |
| 2019 | **North Carolina A&T** | 9–3 | 6–2 | Sam Washington |
| 2019 | South Carolina State | 8–3 | 6–2 | Oliver Pough |
| 2021 | **South Carolina State** | 7–5 | 5–0 | Oliver Pough |
| 2022 | **North Carolina Central** | 10–2 | 4–1 | Trei Oliver |
| 2022 | Howard | 5–6 | 4–1 | Larry Scott |
2023
| 2023 | Howard | 6–5 | 4–1 | Larry Scott |
2024
| 2024 | South Carolina State | 9-3 | 5–0 | Chennis Berry |
| 2025 | **South Carolina State** | 9-3 | 5–0 | Chennis Berry |

- **Bold** indicates a Black college football national championship.
- † vacated

== Championships by school ==
| Team | MEAC Championships | Years |
|---|---|---|
| South Carolina State | 20 | 1974, 1975, 1976, 1977, 1978, 1980, 1981, 1982, 1983, 1994, 2004, 2008, 2009, 2010, 2013, 2014, 2019, 2021, 2024, 2025 |
| North Carolina A&T* | 11 | 1975, 1986, 1991, 1992, 1999, 2003, 2014, 2015, 2017, 2018, 2019 |
| Bethune–Cookman* | 8 | 1984, 1988, 2002, 2010, 2012, 2013, 2014, 2015 |
| Florida A&M* | 8 | 1988, 1990, 1995, 1996, 1998, 2000, 2001, 2010 |
| North Carolina Central | 7 | 1972, 1973, 2014, 2015, 2016, 2022, 2023 |
| Delaware State | 6 | 1985, 1987, 1988, 1989, 1991, 2007 |
| Hampton* | 5 | 1997, 1998, 2004, 2005, 2006 |
| Morgan State | 4 | 1971, 1976, 1979, 2014 |
| Howard | 3 | 1993, 2022, 2023 |
| Norfolk State | 1 | 2011 (vacated) |

Italics indicate a shared title.
* indicates a school no longer competing in the MEAC.

== Championships by head coach ==
| Head coach | MEAC Championships |
|---|---|
| Oliver Pough | 8 |
| Willie Jeffries | 6 |
| Joe Taylor | 6 |
| Bill Collick | 5 |
| Billy Joe | 5 |
| Bill Davis | 4 |
| Brian Jenkins | 4 |
| Rod Broadway | 3 |
| Bill Hayes | 3 |
| Jerry Mack | 3 |
| Larry Little | 2 |
| Trei Oliver | 2 |
| Ken Riley | 2 |
| Larry Scott | 2 |
| Sam Washington | 2 |
| Chennis Berry | 2 |
| Earl Banks | 1 |
| Mo Forte | 1 |
| Hornsby Howell | 1 |
| Lee Hull | 1 |
| Henry Lattimore | 1 |
| Al Lavan | 1 |
| George Quiett | 1 |
| Terry Sims | 1 |
| George Small) | 1 |
| Willie Smith | 1 |
| Clarence Thomas | 1 |
| Steve Wilson | 1 |
| Alvin Wyatt | 1 |
