= Corey Fuller =

American football player and coach (born 1971)

No. 27, 24, 25, 26
- Positions: Safety, cornerback

Personal information
- Born: May 1, 1971 (age 55); Tallahassee, Florida, U.S.
- Listed height: 5 ft 10 in (1.78 m)
- Listed weight: 220 lb (100 kg)

Career information
- High school: James S. Rickards (Tallahassee)
- College: Florida State
- NFL draft: 1995: 2nd round, 55th overall pick

Career history
- Minnesota Vikings (1995–1998); Cleveland Browns (1999–2002); Baltimore Ravens (2003–2004)

Awards and highlights
- National champion (1993); First-team All-ACC (1994)

Career NFL statistics
- Tackles: 590
- Interceptions: 17
- Touchdowns: 1
- Stats at Pro Football Reference

Corey Bushe Fuller (born May 1, 1971) is an American football coach and former player. He has been Florida State football Director of Football Relations since Jan 28, 2022. He was the interim head football coach at Florida A&M University in 2014. Fuller was promoted from defensive backs coach to interim head coach after having been the head football coach at East Gadsden High School from 2010 to 2012. He played in the National Football League (NFL) for ten seasons, from 1995 to 2004, with the Minnesota Vikings, Cleveland Browns, and Baltimore Ravens. In his NFL career, Fuller played in 152 games, intercepting 17 passes for 145 yards and one touchdown.

Pre-draft measurables
Height	Weight	Arm length	Hand span	40-yard dash	10-yard split	20-yard split	Bench press
5 ft 10 3/8 in (1.79 m)	197 lb (89 kg)	31 1/4 in (0.79 m)	9 1/2 in (0.24 m)	4.56 s	1.71 s	2.69 s	11 reps
All values from NFL Combine

A 5'10", 209-lb. defensive back from Florida State University, Fuller was selected by the Vikings in the second round (55th overall) of the 1995 NFL draft. He played high school football at James S. Rickards High School.

Following a 1996 game between the Minnesota Vikings and the Green Bay Packers, Fuller was fined $30,000 for poking the left eye of Packers center Frank Winters.

== NFL career statistics ==
Legend
	Led the league
**Bold**	Career high

=== Regular season ===
Year	Team	Games		Tackles					Interceptions					Fumbles			
Year	Team	GP	GS	Cmb	Solo	Ast	Sck	TFL	Int	Yds	TD	Lng	PD	FF	FR	Yds	TD
1995	MIN	16	10	66	57	9	0.5	-	1	0	0	0	-	**2**	1	**12**	**1**
1996	MIN	16	14	64	53	11	0.0	-	3	3	0	2	-	1	0	0	0
1997	MIN	16	16	**91**	**82**	9	0.0	-	2	24	0	22	-	**2**	0	0	0
1998	MIN	16	16	79	70	9	**1.0**	-	**4**	36	0	26	-	0	0	0	0
1999	CLE	16	16	76	63	13	0.0	1	0	0	0	0	11	**2**	**2**	0	0
2000	CLE	15	15	42	37	5	0.0	0	3	0	0	0	10	1	1	0	0
2001	CLE	16	16	87	72	**15**	0.0	3	3	**82**	**1**	**49**	**21**	**2**	1	0	0
2002	CLE	13	12	33	28	5	0.0	0	1	0	0	0	8	0	0	0	0
2003	BAL	14	10	36	31	5	0.0	0	0	0	0	0	5	0	0	0	0
2004	BAL	14	2	23	17	6	0.0	**4**	0	0	0	0	0	0	0	0	0
Career		152	127	597	510	87	1.5	8	17	145	1	49	55	10	5	12	1

=== Postseason ===
Year	Team	Games		Tackles					Interceptions					Fumbles			
Year	Team	GP	GS	Cmb	Solo	Ast	Sck	TFL	Int	Yds	TD	Lng	PD	FF	FR	Yds	TD
1996	MIN	1	1	3	3	0	0.0	-	0	0	0	0	-	0	0	0	0
1997	MIN	2	2	**15**	**15**	0	0.0	-	0	0	0	0	-	0	0	0	0
1998	MIN	2	2	**15**	**15**	0	0.0	-	0	0	0	0	-	0	0	0	0
2002	CLE	1	1	6	5	**1**	0.0	0	0	0	0	0	**1**	0	0	0	0
2003	BAL	1	0	0	0	0	0.0	0	0	0	0	0	**1**	0	0	0	0
Career		7	6	39	38	1	0.0	0	0	0	0	0	2	0	0	0	0

== Head coaching record ==
Year	Team	Overall	Conference	Standing	Bowl/playoffs
Florida A&M Rattlers (Mid-Eastern Athletic Conference) (2014)
2014	Florida A&M	1–3	1–3	T–7th	
Florida A&M:		1–3	1–3		
Total:		1–3			
