= 2014 Delaware State Hornets football team =

American college football season

2014 Delaware State Hornets football
- Conference: Mid-Eastern Athletic Conference
- Record: 2–10 (2–6 MEAC)
- Head coach: Kermit Blount (4th season)
- Offensive coordinator: Arrington Jones (4th season)
- Defensive coordinator: Mike Ketchum (4th season)
- Home stadium: Alumni Stadium

2014 Mid-Eastern Athletic Conference football standings
	Conf.			Overall
Team	W		L	W		L
No. 23 Bethune–Cookman +	6	–	2	9	–	3
North Carolina A&T +	6	–	2	9	–	3
South Carolina State +	6	–	2	8	–	4
North Carolina Central +	6	–	2	7	–	5
Morgan State +^	6	–	2	7	–	6
Norfolk State	4	–	4	4	–	8
Howard	3	–	5	5	–	7
Florida A&M *	3	–	5	3	–	9
Hampton	2	–	6	3	–	9
Delaware State	2	–	6	2	–	10
Savannah State *	0	–	8	0	–	12
+ – Conference co-champions; ^ – FCS playoff participant; * Florida A&M and Savannah State ineligible for FCS Playoffs due to APR violations; Rankings from The Sports Network poll

The 2014 Delaware State Hornets football team represented Delaware State University as a member of the Mid-Eastern Athletic Conference (MEAC) in the 2014 NCAA Division I FCS football season. Led by Kermit Blount in his fourth and final season as head coach, the Hornets compiled an overall record of 2–10 with a mark of 2–6 in conference play, tying for ninth place in the MEAC. Delaware State played home games at Alumni Stadium in Dover, Delaware.

On December 16, Delaware State opted not to renew Blount's contract. He finished his tenure at Delaware State with a four-year record of 16–29.

== Schedule ==
Date	Time	Opponent	Site	TV	Result	Attendance
August 30	1:00 pm	at Monmouth*	Kessler Field; West Long Branch, NJ		L 21–52	2,150
September 6	6:00 pm	at Delaware*	Delaware Stadium; Newark, DE (Route 1 Rivalry)		L 9–27	12,511
September 13	2:00 pm	Towson*	Alumni Stadium; Dover, DE		L 7–21	2,588
September 20	1:00 pm	at Temple*	Lincoln Financial Field; Philadelphia, PA	ESPN3	L 0–59	19,202
September 27	6:00 pm	Savannah State	Alumni Stadium; Dover, DE		W 35–10	2,775
October 4	4:00 pm	at No. 17 Bethune-Cookman	Municipal Stadium; Daytona Beach, FL		L 7–27	6,445
October 11	2:00 pm	at Norfolk State	William "Dick" Price Stadium; Norfolk, VA		W 13–10 ^{OT}	11,260
October 18	2:00 pm	North Carolina A&T^{†}	Alumni Stadium; Dover, DE	DESU-TV	L 20–33	6,237
October 25	2:00 pm	Hampton	Alumni Stadium; Dover, DE	DESU-TV	L 0–23	2,385
November 1	1:00 pm	at Howard	William H. Greene Stadium; Washington, D.C.		L 10–17	307
November 15	2:00 pm	Florida A&M	Alumni Stadium; Dover, DE	DESU-TV	L 7–41	2,437
November 22	1:00 pm	at Morgan State	Hughes Stadium; Baltimore, MD		L 7–69	1,456
*Non-conference game; ^{†}Homecoming; Rankings from The Sports Network Poll released prior to the game; All times are in Eastern time
