= 2014 Savannah State Tigers football team =

American college football season

2014 Savannah State Tigers football
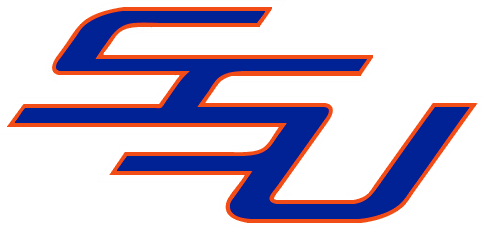
- Conference: Mid-Eastern Athletic Conference
- Record: 0–12 (0–8 MEAC)
- Head coach: Earnest Wilson (2nd season)
- Offensive coordinator: Mike Villagrana (1st season)
- Defensive coordinator: Corey Barlow (2nd season)
- Home stadium: Ted A. Wright Stadium

2014 Mid-Eastern Athletic Conference football standings
	Conf.			Overall
Team	W		L	W		L
No. 23 Bethune–Cookman +	6	–	2	9	–	3
North Carolina A&T +	6	–	2	9	–	3
South Carolina State +	6	–	2	8	–	4
North Carolina Central +	6	–	2	7	–	5
Morgan State +^	6	–	2	7	–	6
Norfolk State	4	–	4	4	–	8
Howard	3	–	5	5	–	7
Florida A&M *	3	–	5	3	–	9
Hampton	2	–	6	3	–	9
Delaware State	2	–	6	2	–	10
Savannah State *	0	–	8	0	–	12
+ – Conference co-champions; ^ – FCS playoff participant; * Florida A&M and Savannah State ineligible for FCS Playoffs due to APR violations; Rankings from The Sports Network poll

The 2014 Savannah State Tigers football team represented Savannah State University in the 2014 NCAA Division I FCS football season. The Tigers were members of the Mid-Eastern Athletic Conference (MEAC). This was their second season under the guidance of head coach Earnest Wilson and the Tigers played their home games at Ted Wright Stadium. They finished the season 0–12, 0–8 in MEAC play to finish in last place.

== Schedule ==
Date	Time	Opponent	Site	TV	Result	Attendance
August 30	7:00 pm	at Middle Tennessee*	Johnny "Red" Floyd Stadium; Murfreesboro, TN		L 7–61	15,605
September 6	6:00 pm	at Georgia Southern*	Paulson Stadium; Statesboro, GA	ESPN3	L 9–83	23,121
September 13	6:00 pm	Fort Valley State*	Ted Wright Stadium; Savannah, GA		L 28–42	3,516
September 27	6:00 pm	at Delaware State	Alumni Stadium; Dover, DE		L 10–35	2,775
October 4	2:00 pm	Norfolk State^{†}	Ted Wright Stadium; Savannah, GA		L 7–14	5,268
October 11	5:00 pm	at Florida A&M	Bragg Memorial Stadium; Tallahassee, FL		L 14–24	9,868
October 18	6:00 pm	No. 16 Bethune-Cookman	Ted Wright Stadium; Savannah, GA		L 20–48	1,271
October 25	1:00 pm	at North Carolina Central	O'Kelly–Riddick Stadium; Durham, NC		L 14–42	2,909
November 1	1:30 pm	at South Carolina State	Oliver C. Dawson Stadium; Orangeburg, SC		L 7–59	10,013
November 8	6:00 pm	Howard	Ted Wright Stadium; Savannah, GA		L 21–51	2,102
November 15	2:00 pm	North Carolina A&T	Ted Wright Stadium; Savannah, GA		L 0–34	1,656
November 22	3:00 pm	at BYU*	LaVell Edwards Stadium; Provo, UT	BYUtv	L 0–64	52,123
*Non-conference game; ^{†}Homecoming; Rankings from The Sports Network Poll released prior to the game; All times are in Eastern time
