= 2014 Florida A&M Rattlers football team =

American college football season

2014 Florida A&M Rattlers football
- Conference: Mid-Eastern Athletic Conference
- Record: 3–9 (3–5 MEAC)
- Head coach: Earl Holmes (2nd season; first 8 games); Corey Fuller (interim, final 4 games)
- Offensive coordinator: Quinn Gray (2nd season)
- Offensive scheme: Pro-style
- Defensive coordinator: Levon Kirkland (2nd season)
- Base defense: 4–3
- Home stadium: Bragg Memorial Stadium

2014 Mid-Eastern Athletic Conference football standings
	Conf.			Overall
Team	W		L	W		L
No. 23 Bethune–Cookman +	6	–	2	9	–	3
North Carolina A&T +	6	–	2	9	–	3
South Carolina State +	6	–	2	8	–	4
North Carolina Central +	6	–	2	7	–	5
Morgan State +^	6	–	2	7	–	6
Norfolk State	4	–	4	4	–	8
Howard	3	–	5	5	–	7
Florida A&M *	3	–	5	3	–	9
Hampton	2	–	6	3	–	9
Delaware State	2	–	6	2	–	10
Savannah State *	0	–	8	0	–	12
+ – Conference co-champions; ^ – FCS playoff participant; * Florida A&M and Savannah State ineligible for FCS Playoffs due to APR violations; Rankings from The Sports Network poll

The 2014 Florida A&M Rattlers football team represented as the Florida A&M University in the 2014 NCAA Division I FCS football season. The Rattlers were led by their second year head coach Earl Holmes for the first eight games. In mid-season, he was fired. Holmes was replaced by Corey Fuller for the remainder of the season. They played their home games at Bragg Memorial Stadium. They were the members of the Mid-Eastern Athletic Conference. They finished the season with a disappointing 3–9 record and a 3–5 in MEAC play to finish in a tie for seventh place which and did not qualify for post-season play.

If they had qualified for the post-season, the Rattlers would've been ineligible to participate in post season play due to several APR violations.

== Schedule ==
Date	Time	Opponent	Site	TV	Result	Attendance
August 30	6:00 pm	at Jackson State*	Mississippi Veterans Memorial Stadium		L 17–22	10,503
September 6	7:00 pm	at Miami (FL)*	Sun Life Stadium	ESPN3	L 7–41	48,254
September 20	5:00 pm	No. 5 Coastal Carolina*	Bragg Memorial Stadium	RV	L 3–48	12,000
September 27	7:00 pm	at No. 21 Tennessee State*	LP Field		L 7–27	29,225
October 4	5:00 pm	Morgan State	Bragg Memorial Stadium	RV	L 9–24	7,657
October 11	5:00 pm	Savannah State	Bragg Memorial Stadium	RV	W 24–14	9,868
October 18	1:00 pm	at Howard	William H. Greene Stadium		W 31–28	7,086
October 25	1:00 pm	at North Carolina A&T	Aggie Stadium		L 21–40	21,500
November 1	3:00 pm	Norfolk State^{†}	Bragg Memorial Stadium	RV	L 10–12	18,663
November 8	3:00 pm	South Carolina State	Bragg Memorial Stadium; Tallahassee, FL	RV	L 17–34	7,675
November 15	2:00 pm	at Delaware State	Alumni Stadium; Dover, DE		W 41–7	2,437
November 22	2:00 pm	vs. No. 25 Bethune-Cookman	Florida Citrus Bowl Stadium (Florida Classic)	ESPNC	L 17–18 ^{OT}	41,126
*Non-conference game; ^{†}Homecoming; Rankings from The Sports Network Poll released prior to the game; All times are in Eastern time
