= 2014 Howard Bison football team =

American college football season

2014 Howard Bison football
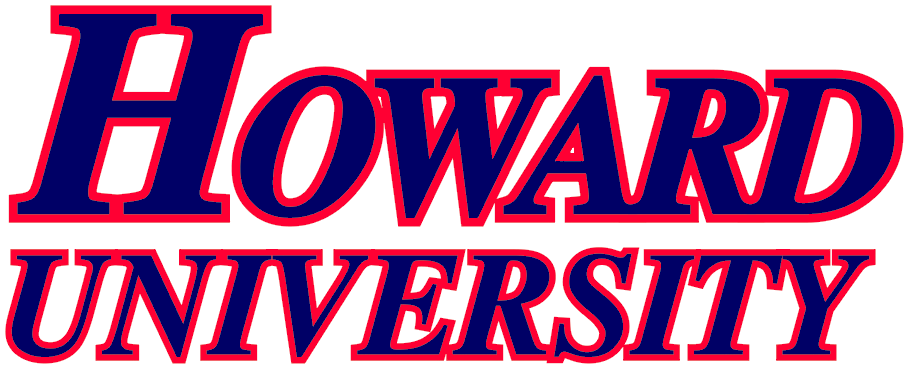
- Conference: Mid-Eastern Athletic Conference
- Record: 5–7 (3–5 MEAC)
- Head coach: Gary Harrell (3rd season)
- Offensive coordinator: Ted White (4th season)
- Defensive coordinator: Rayford Petty (4th season)
- Home stadium: William H. Greene Stadium

2014 Mid-Eastern Athletic Conference football standings
	Conf.			Overall
Team	W		L	W		L
No. 23 Bethune–Cookman +	6	–	2	9	–	3
North Carolina A&T +	6	–	2	9	–	3
South Carolina State +	6	–	2	8	–	4
North Carolina Central +	6	–	2	7	–	5
Morgan State +^	6	–	2	7	–	6
Norfolk State	4	–	4	4	–	8
Howard	3	–	5	5	–	7
Florida A&M *	3	–	5	3	–	9
Hampton	2	–	6	3	–	9
Delaware State	2	–	6	2	–	10
Savannah State *	0	–	8	0	–	12
+ – Conference co-champions; ^ – FCS playoff participant; * Florida A&M and Savannah State ineligible for FCS Playoffs due to APR violations; Rankings from The Sports Network poll

The 2014 Howard Bison football team represented Howard University as a member of the Mid-Eastern Athletic Conference (MEAC) during the 2014 NCAA Division I FCS football season. Led by third-year head coach Gary Harrell, who returned after a one-year leave of absence, the Bison compiled an overall record of 5–7 with a mark of 3–5, tying for seventh place in the MEAC. Howard played home games at William H. Greene Stadium in Washington, D.C.

== Schedule ==
Date	Time	Opponent	Site	TV	Result	Attendance
August 28	7:00 pm	at Akron*	InfoCision Stadium–Summa Field; Akron, OH	ESPN3	L 0–41	9,104
September 6	12:00 pm	at Rutgers*	High Point Solutions Stadium; Piscataway, NJ	BTN	L 25–38	48,040
September 13	3:30 pm	vs. Morehouse*	Robert F. Kennedy Memorial Stadium; Washington DC (Nation's Football Classic)	CSNMA	W 35–17	6,651
September 20	3:00 pm	vs. Morgan State	MetLife Stadium; East Rutherford, NJ (NY Urban League Classic, rivalry)	ESPN3	L 35–38	28,712
September 27	1:00 pm	North Carolina A&T	William H. Greene Stadium; Washington, DC		L 22–38	7,086
October 4	1:00 pm	at North Carolina Central	O'Kelly–Riddick Stadium; Durham, NC		L 22–27	6,772
October 11	4:00 pm	at No. 18 Bethune-Cookman	Municipal Stadium; Daytona Beach, FL		L 12–49	10,247
October 18	1:00 pm	Florida A&M^{†}	William H. Greene Stadium; Washington, DC		L 28–31	7,086
November 1	1:00 pm	Delaware State	William H. Greene Stadium; Washington, DC		W 17–10	307
November 8	7:00 pm	at Savannah State	Ted Wright Stadium; Savannah, GA		W 51–21	2,102
November 15	1:00 pm	at Central Connecticut*	Arute Field; New Britain, CT		W 28–25	3,517
November 22	1:00 pm	Hampton	William H. Greene Stadium; Washington, DC (The Real HU)		W 30–29	3,842
*Non-conference game; ^{†}Homecoming; Rankings from The Sports Network Poll released prior to the game; All times are in Eastern time
