= Atlanta Football Classic =

Former HBCU classic game

- Bank of America Atlanta Football Classic
- Stadium: Georgia Dome
- Location: Atlanta
- Previous stadiums: Bobby Dodd Stadium
- Operated: 1989–2014
- Conference tie-ins: MEAC

Sponsors
- Bank of America

2014 matchup
- North Carolina A&T 0, South Carolina State 13

The Bank of America Atlanta Football Classic was an annual football classic game between two historically black colleges and universities. The game has since been replaced by the Celebration Bowl HBCU championship game.

== History ==
The game was played annually in Atlanta. The first three years, it was held at Bobby Dodd Stadium, and at the Georgia Dome from 1992 to 2014.

=== Coverage ===
Versus/NBCSN broadcast the game from 2008 to 2012. Because the two participants in the 2013 and 2014 contests are both part of the Mid-Eastern Athletic Conference, to which ESPN held broadcast rights, ESPN broadcast the game on its online outlet, ESPN3.

=== Game results ===
| Winner | Score | Loser | Date | Location | Attendance | Source |
|---|---|---|---|---|---|---|
| Florida A&M | 21–9 | Tennessee State | September 23, 1989 | Bobby Dodd Stadium | 47,373 | |
| Tennessee State | 20–16 | Florida A&M | September 22, 1990 | Bobby Dodd Stadium | 46,024 | |
| South Carolina State | 30–23 | Southern | September 28, 1991 | Bobby Dodd Stadium | 26,560 | |
| Southern | 19–18 | South Carolina State | September 19, 1992 | Georgia Dome | 55,296 | |
| Southern | 14–10 | South Carolina State | September 25, 1993 | Georgia Dome | 58,199 | |
| Tennessee State | 32–28 | South Carolina State | September 24, 1994 | Georgia Dome | 58,131 | |
| Tennessee State | 15–14 | South Carolina State | September 30, 1995 | Georgia Dome | 52,387 | |
| Southern | 19–18 | Tennessee State | September 28, 1996 | Georgia Dome | 45,894 | |
| South Carolina State | 34–28 | Tennessee State | September 27, 1997 | Georgia Dome | 41,292 | |
| Florida A&M | 31–23 | Tennessee State | September 26, 1998 | Georgia Dome | 28,987 | |
| Tennessee State | 42–25 | Florida A&M | September 18, 1999 | Georgia Dome | 44,812` | |
| Florida A&M | 31–6 | Tennessee State | September 23, 2000 | Georgia Dome | 62,455 | |
| Tennessee State | 27–7 | Florida A&M | September 22, 2001 | Georgia Dome | 61,052 | |
| Florida A&M | 37–24 | Tennessee State | September 28, 2002 | Georgia Dome | 67,167 | |
| Florida A&M | 10–7 | Tennessee State | September 20, 2003 | Georgia Dome | 70,185 | |
| Florida A&M | 21–15 | Tennessee State | September 25, 2004 | Georgia Dome | 67,712 | |
| Florida A&M | 12–7 | Tennessee State | September 24, 2005 | Georgia Dome | 56,297 | |
| Florida A&M | 25–22 | Tennessee State | September 30, 2006 | Georgia Dome | 57,885 | |
| Florida A&M | 18–17 | Tennessee State | September 29, 2007 | Georgia Dome | 56,990 | |
| Florida A&M | 28–14 | Tennessee State | September 27, 2008 | Georgia Dome | 50,428 | |
| Florida A&M | 31–12 | Tennessee State | September 26, 2009 | Georgia Dome | 51,950 | |
| Tennessee State | 29–18 | Florida A&M | September 25, 2010 | Georgia Dome | 54,202 | |
| Florida A&M | 38–33 | Southern | September 24, 2011 | Georgia Dome | 59,373 | |
| Southern | 21–14 | Florida A&M | September 29, 2012 | Georgia Dome | 41,042 | |
| South Carolina State | 29–24 | North Carolina A&T | October 5, 2013 | Georgia Dome | 35,412 | |
| South Carolina State | 13–0 | North Carolina A&T | October 4, 2014 | Georgia Dome | 24,441 | |

=== Records ===
| Team | Wins | Losses |
|---|---|---|
| Florida A&M | 11 | 6 |
| Tennessee State | 7 | 12 |
| South Carolina State | 4 | 4 |
| Southern | 3 | 3 |

== See also ==
- List of black college football classics
