= Tony McRae =

Tony McRae may refer to:

- Tony McRae (politician) (born 1957), Australian politician
- Tony McRae (American football) (born 1993), American football cornerback
