= 2014 Norfolk State Spartans football team =

American college football season

2014 Norfolk State Spartans football
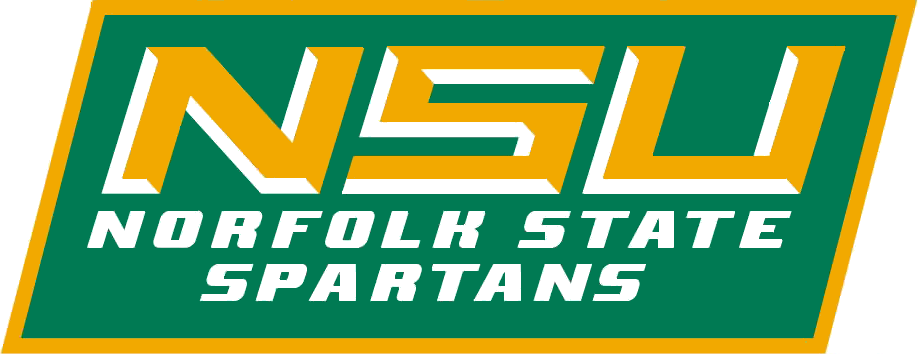
- Conference: Mid-Eastern Athletic Conference
- Record: 4–8 (4–4 MEAC)
- Head coach: Pete Adrian (10th season)
- Offensive coordinator: Rod Holder (1st season)
- Defensive coordinator: Mark DeBastiani (10th season)
- Home stadium: William "Dick" Price Stadium

2014 Mid-Eastern Athletic Conference football standings
	Conf.			Overall
Team	W		L	W		L
No. 23 Bethune–Cookman +	6	–	2	9	–	3
North Carolina A&T +	6	–	2	9	–	3
South Carolina State +	6	–	2	8	–	4
North Carolina Central +	6	–	2	7	–	5
Morgan State +^	6	–	2	7	–	6
Norfolk State	4	–	4	4	–	8
Howard	3	–	5	5	–	7
Florida A&M *	3	–	5	3	–	9
Hampton	2	–	6	3	–	9
Delaware State	2	–	6	2	–	10
Savannah State *	0	–	8	0	–	12
+ – Conference co-champions; ^ – FCS playoff participant; * Florida A&M and Savannah State ineligible for FCS Playoffs due to APR violations; Rankings from The Sports Network poll

The 2014 Norfolk State Spartans football team represented Norfolk State University in the 2014 NCAA Division I FCS football season. They were led by tenth-year head coach Pete Adrian and played their home games at William "Dick" Price Stadium. They were a member of the Mid-Eastern Athletic Conference (MEAC). They finished the season 4–8, 4–4 in MEAC play to finish in sixth place.

On November 24, head coach Adrian announced his retirement. He finished at Norfolk State with a ten-year record of 54–60.

== Schedule ==
Date	Time	Opponent	Site	TV	Result	Attendance
August 30	6:00 pm	at No. 25 Maine*	Alfond Stadium; Orono, ME		L 6–10	6,951
September 6	4:00 pm	Liberty*	William "Dick" Price Stadium; Norfolk, VA		L 0–17	6,150
September 13	7:00 pm	at No. 16 William & Mary*	Zable Stadium; Williamsburg, VA		L 14–29	8,254
September 20	3:30 pm	at Buffalo*	University at Buffalo Stadium; Buffalo, NY	ESPN3	L 7–36	21,139
September 27	4:00 pm	Morgan State	William "Dick" Price Stadium; Norfolk, VA	SSC	W 15–14	6,511
October 4	2:00 pm	at Savannah State	Ted Wright Stadium; Savannah, GA		W 14–7	5,268
October 11	2:00 pm	Delaware State^{†}	William "Dick" Price Stadium; Norfolk, VA	SSC	L 10–13 ^{OT}	11,260
October 18	1:00 pm	at Hampton	Armstrong Stadium; Hampton, VA (Battle of the Bay)	ESPN3	W 21–13	11,000
November 1	3:00 pm	at Florida A&M	Bragg Memorial Stadium; Tallahassee, FL		W 12–10	18,663
November 6	7:30 pm	No. 20 Bethune–Cookman	William "Dick" Price Stadium; Norfolk, VA	ESPNU	L 7–13	4,220
November 15	2:00 pm	North Carolina Central	William "Dick" Price Stadium; Norfolk, VA	SSC	L 14–19	3,980
November 22	1:30 pm	at South Carolina State	Oliver C. Dawson Stadium; Orangeburg, SC		L 20–30	7,339
*Non-conference game; ^{†}Homecoming; Rankings from The Sports Network Poll released prior to the game; All times are in Eastern time
