= 2014 Hampton Pirates football team =

American college football season

2014 Hampton Pirates football
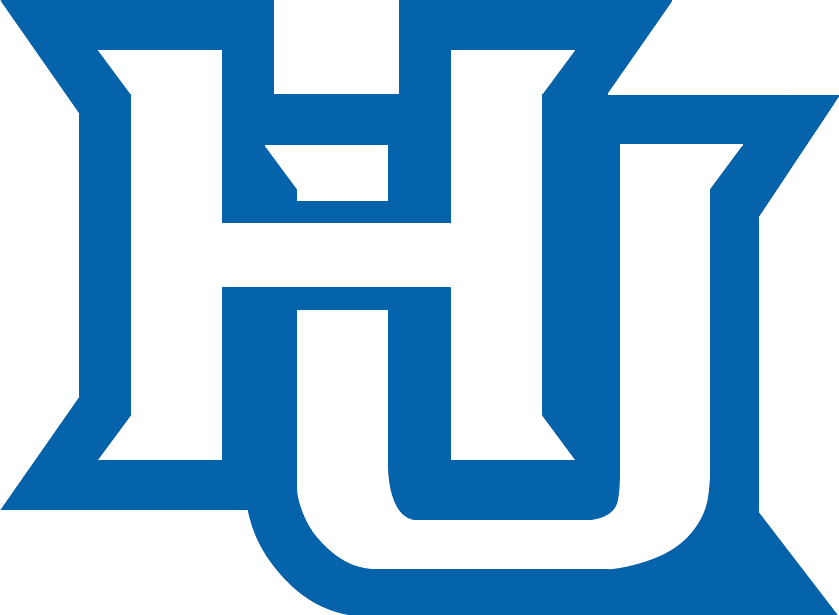
- Conference: Mid-Eastern Athletic Conference
- Record: 3–9 (2–6 MEAC)
- Head coach: Connell Maynor (1st season)
- Defensive coordinator: Kenny Phillips (1st season)
- Home stadium: Armstrong Stadium

2014 Mid-Eastern Athletic Conference football standings
	Conf.			Overall
Team	W		L	W		L
No. 23 Bethune–Cookman +	6	–	2	9	–	3
North Carolina A&T +	6	–	2	9	–	3
South Carolina State +	6	–	2	8	–	4
North Carolina Central +	6	–	2	7	–	5
Morgan State +^	6	–	2	7	–	6
Norfolk State	4	–	4	4	–	8
Howard	3	–	5	5	–	7
Florida A&M *	3	–	5	3	–	9
Hampton	2	–	6	3	–	9
Delaware State	2	–	6	2	–	10
Savannah State *	0	–	8	0	–	12
+ – Conference co-champions; ^ – FCS playoff participant; * Florida A&M and Savannah State ineligible for FCS Playoffs due to APR violations; Rankings from The Sports Network poll

The 2014 Hampton Pirates football team represented Hampton University in the 2014 NCAA Division I FCS football season. They were led by first year head coach Connell Maynor and played their home games at Armstrong Stadium. They were a member of the Mid-Eastern Athletic Conference. They finished the season 3–9, 2–6 in MEAC play to finish in a tie for ninth place.

== Schedule ==
Date	Time	Opponent	Site	TV	Result	Attendance
August 30	3:30 pm	at Old Dominion*	Foreman Field; Norfolk, VA	ASN	L 28–41	20,118
September 6	6:00 pm	No. 21 William & Mary*	Armstrong Stadium; Hampton, VA (Alumni Day)	PTV	L 14–42	3,338
September 13	6:00 pm	at No. 18 Richmond*	Robins Stadium; Richmond, VA		L 17–42	7,802
September 20	6:00 pm	Miles*	Armstrong Stadium; Hampton, VA		W 34–30	5,000
September 27	6:00 pm	South Carolina State	Armstrong Stadium; Hampton, VA	PTV	L 10–17	6,000
October 9	7:30 pm	at North Carolina A&T	Aggie Stadium; Greensboro, NC	ESPNU	L 14–31	12,947
October 18	1:00 pm	Norfolk State	Armstrong Stadium; Hampton, VA (Battle of the Bay)	ESPN3	L 13–21	11,000
October 25	2:00 pm	at Delaware State	Alumni Stadium; Dover, DE		W 23–0	2,385
November 1	2:00 pm	Morgan State^{†}	Armstrong Stadium; Hampton, VA	PTV	L 35–38	8,000
November 8	2:00 pm	at North Carolina Central	O'Kelly–Riddick Stadium; Durham, NC		L 13–47	11,964
November 13	7:30 pm	No. 20 Bethune-Cookman	Armstrong Stadium; Hampton, VA	ESPNU	W 40–35	6,000
November 22	1:00 pm	at Howard	William H. Greene Stadium; Washington, D.C. (Battle of "The Real HU")		L 29–30	3,842
*Non-conference game; ^{†}Homecoming; Rankings from The Sports Network Poll released prior to the game; All times are in Eastern time

- Source: schedule
