= 2014 North Carolina Central Eagles football team =

American college football season

2014 North Carolina Central Eagles football

MEAC co-champion
- Conference: Mid-Eastern Athletic Conference
- Record: 7–5 (6–2 MEAC)
- Head coach: Jerry Mack (1st season)
- Defensive coordinator: Granville Eastman (1st season)
- Home stadium: O'Kelly–Riddick Stadium

2014 Mid-Eastern Athletic Conference football standings
	Conf.			Overall
Team	W		L	W		L
No. 23 Bethune–Cookman +	6	–	2	9	–	3
North Carolina A&T +	6	–	2	9	–	3
South Carolina State +	6	–	2	8	–	4
North Carolina Central +	6	–	2	7	–	5
Morgan State +^	6	–	2	7	–	6
Norfolk State	4	–	4	4	–	8
Howard	3	–	5	5	–	7
Florida A&M *	3	–	5	3	–	9
Hampton	2	–	6	3	–	9
Delaware State	2	–	6	2	–	10
Savannah State *	0	–	8	0	–	12
+ – Conference co-champions; ^ – FCS playoff participant; * Florida A&M and Savannah State ineligible for FCS Playoffs due to APR violations; Rankings from The Sports Network poll

The 2014 North Carolina Central Eagles football team represented North Carolina Central University as a member of the Mid-Eastern Athletic Conference (MEAC) during the 2014 NCAA Division I FCS football season. Led by first-year head coach Jerry Mack, the Eagles compiled an overall record of 7–5 with a mark of 6–2, placing in a five-way tie for the MEAC title with Bethune–Cookman, Morgan State, North Carolina A&T, and South Carolina State. Morgan State earned the conference's automatic bid to the NCAA Division I Football Championship playoffs, while none of the other four co-champions earned an at-large bid. North Carolina Central played home games at O'Kelly–Riddick Stadium in Durham, North Carolina.

== Schedule ==
Date	Time	Opponent	Site	TV	Result	Attendance
August 30	8:00 pm	at East Carolina*	Dowdy–Ficklen Stadium; Greenville, NC	ESPNews	L 7–52	42,758
September 6	5:00 pm	Elizabeth City State*	O'Kelly–Riddick Stadium; Durham, NC		W 34–7	7,705
September 13	5:00 pm	Charlotte*	O'Kelly–Riddick Stadium; Durham, NC		L 28–40	4,006
September 20	6:00 pm	at Towson*	Johnny Unitas Stadium; Towson, MD		L 20–31	9,364
October 4	2:00 pm	Howard	O'Kelly–Riddick Stadium; Durham, NC		W 27–22	6,772
October 11	2:00 pm	at South Carolina State	Oliver C. Dawson Stadium; Orangeburg, SC		W 48–35	15,481
October 18	1:00 pm	at Morgan State	Hughes Stadium; Baltimore, MD		L 20–21	9,420
October 25	2:00 pm	Savannah State	O'Kelly–Riddick Stadium; Durham, NC		W 42–14	2,909
November 1	4:00 pm	at No. 21 Bethune–Cookman	Municipal Stadium; Daytona Beach, FL		L 20–34	3,661
November 8	2:00 pm	Hampton^{†}	O'Kelly–Riddick Stadium; Durham, NC		W 47–13	11,964
November 15	2:00 pm	at Norfolk State	William "Dick" Price Stadium; Norfolk, VA		W 19–14	3,980
November 22	2:00 pm	No. 24 North Carolina A&T	O'Kelly–Riddick Stadium; Durham, NC (rivalry)		W 21–14	13,326
*Non-conference game; ^{†}Homecoming; Rankings from The Sports Network Poll released prior to the game; All times are in Eastern time
