= 2014 Morgan State Bears football team =

American college football season

2014 Morgan State Bears football
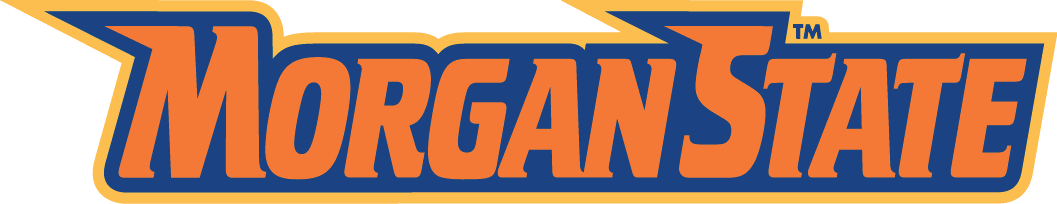

MEAC co-champion

NCAA Division I First Round, L 24–46 vs. Richmond
- Conference: Mid-Eastern Athletic Conference
- Record: 7–6 (6–2 MEAC)
- Head coach: Lee Hull (1st season)
- Offensive coordinator: Fred Farrier (1st season)
- Defensive coordinator: John Morgan (1st season)
- Home stadium: Hughes Stadium

2014 Mid-Eastern Athletic Conference football standings
	Conf.			Overall
Team	W		L	W		L
No. 23 Bethune–Cookman +	6	–	2	9	–	3
North Carolina A&T +	6	–	2	9	–	3
South Carolina State +	6	–	2	8	–	4
North Carolina Central +	6	–	2	7	–	5
Morgan State +^	6	–	2	7	–	6
Norfolk State	4	–	4	4	–	8
Howard	3	–	5	5	–	7
Florida A&M *	3	–	5	3	–	9
Hampton	2	–	6	3	–	9
Delaware State	2	–	6	2	–	10
Savannah State *	0	–	8	0	–	12
+ – Conference co-champions; ^ – FCS playoff participant; * Florida A&M and Savannah State ineligible for FCS Playoffs due to APR violations; Rankings from The Sports Network poll

The 2014 Morgan State Bears football team represented Morgan State University in the 2014 NCAA Division I FCS football season. They were led by first-year head coach Lee Hull and played their home games at Hughes Stadium. They were a member of the Mid-Eastern Athletic Conference (MAC). Morgan State finished the season 7–6 overall and 6–2 in MEAC play to finish in a five-way tie for a share of the conference championship. After tiebreakers, they received the conference's automatic bid to the FCS Playoffs, where they lost in the first round to Richmond.

== Schedule ==
Date	Time	Opponent	Site	TV	Result	Attendance
August 30	6:00 pm	at Eastern Michigan*	Rynearson Stadium; Ypsilanti, MI	ESPN3	L 28–31	8,748
September 6	1:00 pm	at Holy Cross*	Fitton Field; Worcester, MA		L 26–29	6,172
September 13	1:00 pm	Bowie State*	Hughes Stadium; Baltimore, MD		W 28–3	4,238
September 20	4:00 pm	vs. Howard	MetLife Stadium; East Rutherford, NJ (NY Urban League Classic) (Rivalry)	ESPN3	W 38–35	28,712
September 27	4:00 pm	at Norfolk State	William "Dick" Price Stadium; Norfolk, VA		L 14–15	6,511
October 4	5:00 pm	at Florida A&M	Bragg Memorial Stadium; Tallahassee, FL		W 24–9	7,657
October 18	1:00 pm	North Carolina Central^{†}	Hughes Stadium; Baltimore, MD		W 21–20	9,420
October 25	3:30 pm	at No. 5 Villanova*	Villanova Stadium; Villanova, PA		L 28–48	7,821
November 1	2:00 pm	at Hampton	Armstrong Stadium; Hampton, VA		W 38–35	8,000
November 8	1:00 pm	at North Carolina A&T	Aggie Stadium; Greensboro, NC		L 0–45	10,139
November 15	1:00 pm	South Carolina State	Hughes Stadium; Baltimore, MD		W 24–21	3,014
November 22	1:00 pm	Delaware State	Hughes Stadium; Baltimore, MD		W 69–7	1,456
November 29	1:00 pm	at No. 18 Richmond*	Robins Stadium; Richmond, VA (NCAA Division I First Round)	ESPN3	L 24–46	4,126
*Non-conference game; ^{†}Homecoming; Rankings from The Sports Network Poll released prior to the game; All times are in Eastern time

- Source: Schedule
