= Brian Jenkins (American football) =

American football player and coach (born 1971)

Current position
- Title: Head coach
- Team: Edward Waters
- Conference: SIAC
- Record: 7–6

Biographical details
- Born: March 4, 1971 (age 55); Fort Lauderdale, Florida, U.S.

Playing career
- 1990–1993: Cincinnati
- Positions: Wide receiver, running back

Coaching career (HC unless noted)
- 1994: Western Kentucky (assistant)
- 1995–1998: Eastern Illinois (RB)
- 1999: Eastern Illinois (WR)
- 2000: Bowling Green (RB)
- 2001: Frankfurt Galaxy (STC/RB)
- 2002–2008: Louisiana–Lafayette (STC/RB)
- 2009: Rutgers (WR)
- 2010–2014: Bethune–Cookman
- 2015–2017: Alabama State
- 2018: Alabama A&M (STC/RB)
- 2019: North Carolina Central (STC/RB)
- 2021–2024: Edward Waters (AHC/OC/QB)
- 2025–present: Edward Waters

Head coaching record
- Overall: 62–37
- Tournaments: 0–3 (NCAA D-I playoffs)

Accomplishments and honors

Championships
- 4 MEAC (2010, 2012–2014)

Awards
- 3× MEAC Coach of the Year (2010, 2012, 2013); 2× AFCA FCS R2 Coach of the Year (2010, 2012)

Brian O'Neal Jenkins (born March 4, 1971) is an American football coach. He is the head football coach for Edward Waters University, a position he has held since 2025. Jenkins served as the head football coach at Bethune–Cookman University from 2010 to 2014 and as the head football coach at Alabama State University from 2015 to 2017. His team completed the 2010 season with a record of 10 wins and 2 losses. In his first year, his team was declared the Mid-Eastern Athletic Conference co-champions and the team qualified for the 2010 NCAA Division I Football Championship Series playoffs.

== Head coaching record ==
Year	Team	Overall	Conference	Standing	Bowl/playoffs	TSN^{#}	FCS^{°}
Bethune–Cookman Wildcats (Mid-Eastern Athletic Conference) (2010–2014)
2010	Bethune–Cookman	10–2	7–1	T–1st	L NCAA Division I Second Round		
2011	Bethune–Cookman	8–3	6–2	T–2nd			
2012	Bethune–Cookman	9–3	8–0	1st	L NCAA Division I First Round	22	22
2013	Bethune–Cookman	10–3	7–1	T–1st	L NCAA Division I First Round	16	16
2014	Bethune–Cookman	9–3	6–2	T–1st		23	22
Bethune–Cookman:		46–14	34–6				
Alabama State Hornets (Southwestern Athletic Conference) (2015–2017)
2015	Alabama State	6–5	5–3	2nd (East)			
2016	Alabama State	3–7	3–6	T–3rd (East)			
2017	Alabama State	0–5 (Note: Jenkins was fired after the first five games of the 2017 season. Donald Hill-Eley replaced Jenkins as interim head coach for the final six games of the season. The Hornets finished the season 5–6 overall, placing second in the East Division of the Southwestern Athletic Conference with a 4–3 mark.)	0–2	(East)			
Alabama State:		9–17	8–11				
Edward Waters Tigers (Southern Intercollegiate Athletic Conference) (2025–present)
2025	Edward Waters	5–5	4–4	T–5th			
2026	Edward Waters	6–2	5–1				
Edward Waters:		11–7	9–5				
Total:		66–38					
National championship Conference title Conference division title or championship game berth
^{#}Rankings from final The Sports Network poll.; ^{°}Rankings from final FCS Coaches Poll.
