= Lee Hull =

American gridiron football player and coach (born 1965)

Biographical details
- Born: December 31, 1965 (age 60); Vineland, New Jersey, U.S.

Playing career
- 1984–1987: Holy Cross
- 1990–1992: Winnipeg Blue Bombers
- 1992: Toronto Argonauts
- Position: Wide receiver

Coaching career (HC unless noted)
- 1992–1994: South HS (MA) (OC)
- 1995: Auburn HS (PGC)
- 1996–1997: South HS (MA)
- 1998–2002: Holy Cross (WR)
- 2003–2007: Oregon State (WR)
- 2008–2013: Maryland (WR)
- 2014–2015: Morgan State
- 2016: Indianapolis Colts (WR)
- 2019: Wagner (OC/WR)
- 2020–2022: Howard (OC/QB)
- 2023–2024: Delaware State

Head coaching record
- Overall: 14–33 (college)
- Tournaments: 0–1 (NCAA D-I playoffs)

Accomplishments and honors

Championships
- 1 MEAC (2014)

Awards
- MEAC Coach of the Year (2014)

Lee Hull (born December 31, 1965) is an American gridiron football coach and former player. He was most recently the head coach at Delaware State University, a position he had held from 2023 to 2024. Hull served as the head football coach at Morgan State University from 2014 to 2015. He played college football the College of the Holy Cross and professionally in the Canadian Football League (CFL) with the Winnipeg Blue Bombers and the Toronto Argonauts.

== Early life ==
Hull grew up in Vineland, New Jersey and graduated from Vineland High School in 1984.

== Head coaching record ==
=== College ===
Year	Team	Overall	Conference	Standing	Bowl/playoffs
Morgan State Bears (Mid-Eastern Athletic Conference) (2014–2015)
2014	Morgan State	7–6	6–2	T–1st	L NCAA Division I First Round
2015	Morgan State	5–6	4–4	T–6th	
Morgan State:		12–12	10–6		
Delaware State Hornets (Mid-Eastern Athletic Conference) (2023–2024)
2023	Delaware State	1–10	0–5	6th	
2024	Delaware State	1–11	0–5	6th	
Delaware State:		2–21	0–10		
Total:		14–33			
National championship Conference title Conference division title or championship game berth
