= 2014 Bethune–Cookman Wildcats football team =

American college football season

2014 Bethune–Cookman Wildcats football

MEAC co-champion
- Conference: Mid-Eastern Athletic Conference

Ranking
- Sports Network: No. 23
- FCS Coaches: No. 22
- Record: 9–3 (6–2 MEAC)
- Head coach: Brian Jenkins (5th season)
- Offensive coordinator: Jim Pry (3rd season)
- Defensive coordinator: Charles Jones (5th season)
- Home stadium: Municipal Stadium

2014 Mid-Eastern Athletic Conference football standings
| | Conf. | | | Overall |
| Team | W | | L | W | | L |
|---|---|---|---|---|---|---|
| No. 23 Bethune–Cookman + | 6 | – | 2 | 9 | – | 3 |
| North Carolina A&T + | 6 | – | 2 | 9 | – | 3 |
| South Carolina State + | 6 | – | 2 | 8 | – | 4 |
| North Carolina Central + | 6 | – | 2 | 7 | – | 5 |
| Morgan State +^ | 6 | – | 2 | 7 | – | 6 |
| Norfolk State | 4 | – | 4 | 4 | – | 8 |
| Howard | 3 | – | 5 | 5 | – | 7 |
| Florida A&M * | 3 | – | 5 | 3 | – | 9 |
| Hampton | 2 | – | 6 | 3 | – | 9 |
| Delaware State | 2 | – | 6 | 2 | – | 10 |
| Savannah State * | 0 | – | 8 | 0 | – | 12 |
+ – Conference co-champions; ^ – FCS playoff participant; * Florida A&M and Savannah State ineligible for FCS Playoffs due to APR violations; Rankings from The Sports Network poll

The 2014 Bethune–Cookman Wildcats football team represented Bethune-Cookman University in the 2014 NCAA Division I FCS football season. They were led by fifth-year head coach Brian Jenkins and played their home games at Municipal Stadium. They were a member of the Mid-Eastern Athletic Conference (MEAC. They finished the season 9–3, 6–2 in MEAC play to finish in a five-way tie for the MEAC championship. However, they did not earn the conference's automatic bid to the FCS Playoffs and did not receive an at-large bid.

On December 16, Jenkins resigned to take the head coaching position at Alabama State. He finished at Bethune-Cookman with a five-year record of 46–14.

== Schedule ==
| Date | Time | Opponent | Rank | Site | TV | Result | Attendance |
|---|---|---|---|---|---|---|---|
| August 30 | 7:00 pm | at FIU* | No. 22 | FIU Stadium; Miami, FL | ASN | W 14–12 | 14,053 |
| September 13 | 4:00 pm | Grambling State* | No. 13 | Municipal Stadium; Daytona Beach, FL | | W 36–23 | 9,423 |
| September 20 | 6:00 pm | at UCF* | No. 12 | Bright House Networks Stadium; Orlando, FL | ESPN3 | L 7–41 | 44,510 |
| September 27 | 4:00 pm | Florida Tech* | No. 15 | Municipal Stadium; Daytona Beach, FL | CEN | W 34–33 | 8,431 |
| October 4 | 4:00 pm | Delaware State | No. 17 | Municipal Stadium; Daytona Beach, FL | CEN | W 27–7 | 6,445 |
| October 11 | 4:00 pm | Howard^{†} | No. 18 | Municipal Stadium; Daytona Beach, FL | CEN | W 49–12 | 10,247 |
| October 18 | 6:00 pm | at Savannah State | No. 16 | Ted Wright Stadium; Savannah, GA | | W 48–20 | 1,271 |
| October 25 | 1:30 pm | at South Carolina State | No. 14 | Oliver C. Dawson Stadium; Orangeburg, SC | | L 14–20 | 11,043 |
| November 1 | 4:00 pm | North Carolina Central | No. 21 | Municipal Stadium; Daytona Beach, FL | CEN | W 34–20 | 3,661 |
| November 6 | 7:30 pm | at Norfolk State | No. 20 | William "Dick" Price Stadium; Norfolk, VA | ESPNU | W 13–7 | 4,220 |
| November 13 | 7:30 pm | at Hampton | No. 20 | Armstrong Stadium; Hampton, VA | ESPNU | L 35–40 | 6,000 |
| November 22 | 2:00 pm | vs. Florida A&M | No. 25 | Florida Citrus Bowl Stadium; Orlando, FL (Florida Classic) | ESPNC | W 18–17 | 41,126 |
*Non-conference game; ^{†}Homecoming; Rankings from The Sports Network Poll released prior to the game; All times are in Eastern time

Source: Schedule

== Ranking movements ==
Ranking movements Legend: ██ Increase in ranking ██ Decrease in ranking
| | Week | | | | | | | | | | | | | | |
| Poll | Pre | 1 | 2 | 3 | 4 | 5 | 6 | 7 | 8 | 9 | 10 | 11 | 12 | 13 | Final |
|---|---|---|---|---|---|---|---|---|---|---|---|---|---|---|---|
| Sports Network | 22 | 18 | 13 | 12 | 15 | 17 | 18 | 16 | 14 | 21 | 20 | 20 | 25 | 22 | 23 |
| Coaches | 23 | 18 | 13 | 12 | 14 | 17 | 17 | 14 | 13 | 20 | 18 | 18 | 24 | 20 | 22 |
