= 2014 South Carolina State Bulldogs football team =

American college football season

2014 South Carolina State Bulldogs football
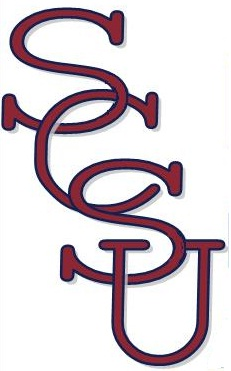

MEAC co-champion
- Conference: Mid-Eastern Athletic Conference
- Record: 8–4 (6–2 MEAC)
- Head coach: Oliver Pough (13th season)
- Offensive coordinator: Joseph Blackwell (6th season)
- Defensive coordinator: Mike Adams (7th season)
- Home stadium: Oliver C. Dawson Stadium

2014 Mid-Eastern Athletic Conference football standings
| | Conf. | | | Overall |
| Team | W | | L | W | | L |
|---|---|---|---|---|---|---|
| No. 23 Bethune–Cookman + | 6 | – | 2 | 9 | – | 3 |
| North Carolina A&T + | 6 | – | 2 | 9 | – | 3 |
| South Carolina State + | 6 | – | 2 | 8 | – | 4 |
| North Carolina Central + | 6 | – | 2 | 7 | – | 5 |
| Morgan State +^ | 6 | – | 2 | 7 | – | 6 |
| Norfolk State | 4 | – | 4 | 4 | – | 8 |
| Howard | 3 | – | 5 | 5 | – | 7 |
| Florida A&M * | 3 | – | 5 | 3 | – | 9 |
| Hampton | 2 | – | 6 | 3 | – | 9 |
| Delaware State | 2 | – | 6 | 2 | – | 10 |
| Savannah State * | 0 | – | 8 | 0 | – | 12 |
+ – Conference co-champions; ^ – FCS playoff participant; * Florida A&M and Savannah State ineligible for FCS Playoffs due to APR violations; Rankings from The Sports Network poll

The 2014 South Carolina State Bulldogs football team represented South Carolina State University in the 2014 NCAA Division I FCS football season. They were led by 13th-year head coach Oliver Pough and played their home games at Oliver C. Dawson Stadium. They were a member of the Mid-Eastern Athletic Conference. They finished the season 8–4, 6–2 in MEAC play to finish in a five-way tie for the MEAC championship. However, they did not earn the conference's automatic bid to the FCS playoffs and did not receive an at-large bid.

== Schedule ==
| Date | Time | Opponent | Site | TV | Result | Attendance |
|---|---|---|---|---|---|---|
| August 30 | 5:00 pm | vs. Benedict* | Williams-Brice Stadium; Columbia, SC (Palmetto Capital City Classic) | | W 63–0 | 10,532 |
| September 6 | 12:30 pm | at No. 23 (FBS) Clemson* | Memorial Stadium; Clemson, SC | ACCN | L 7–73 | 81,672 |
| September 13 | 6:00 pm | at No. 5 Coastal Carolina* | Brooks Stadium; Conway, SC | | L 3–30 | 10,124 |
| September 20 | 6:00 pm | No. 21 Furman* | Oliver C. Dawson Stadium; Orangeburg, SC | | W 17–7 | 9,613 |
| September 27 | 2:00 pm | at Hampton | Armstrong Stadium; Hampton, VA | | W 17–10 | 6,000 |
| October 4 | 3:30 pm | vs. North Carolina A&T | Georgia Dome; Atlanta, GA (Atlanta Football Classic) | ESPN3 | W 13–0 | 24,441 |
| October 11 | 2:00 pm | North Carolina Central | Oliver C. Dawson Stadium; Orangeburg, SC | | L 35–48 | 15,481 |
| October 25 | 1:30 pm | No. 14 Bethune-Cookman | Oliver C. Dawson Stadium; Orangeburg, SC | | W 20–14 | 11,043 |
| November 1 | 1:30 pm | Savannah State^{†} | Oliver C. Dawson Stadium; Orangeburg, SC | | W 59–7 | 10,013 |
| November 8 | 3:00 pm | at Florida A&M | Bragg Memorial Stadium; Tallahassee, FL | | W 34–17 | 7,675 |
| November 15 | 1:00 pm | at Morgan State | Hughes Stadium; Baltimore, MD | | L 21–24 | 3,014 |
| November 22 | 1:30 pm | Norfolk State | Oliver C. Dawson Stadium; Orangeburg, SC | | W 30–20 | 7,339 |
*Non-conference game; ^{†}Homecoming; Rankings from The Sports Network Poll released prior to the game; All times are in Eastern time

- Source: Schedule
