= 2014 North Carolina A&T Aggies football team =

American college football season

2014 North Carolina A&T Aggies football

MEAC co-champion
- Conference: Mid-Eastern Athletic Conference
- Record: 9–3 (6–2 MEAC)
- Head coach: Rod Broadway (4th season)
- Offensive coordinator: Rickey Bustle (2nd season)
- Defensive coordinator: Sam Washington (4th season)
- Home stadium: Aggie Stadium

2014 Mid-Eastern Athletic Conference football standings
	Conf.			Overall
Team	W		L	W		L
No. 23 Bethune–Cookman +	6	–	2	9	–	3
North Carolina A&T +	6	–	2	9	–	3
South Carolina State +	6	–	2	8	–	4
North Carolina Central +	6	–	2	7	–	5
Morgan State +^	6	–	2	7	–	6
Norfolk State	4	–	4	4	–	8
Howard	3	–	5	5	–	7
Florida A&M *	3	–	5	3	–	9
Hampton	2	–	6	3	–	9
Delaware State	2	–	6	2	–	10
Savannah State *	0	–	8	0	–	12
+ – Conference co-champions; ^ – FCS playoff participant; * Florida A&M and Savannah State ineligible for FCS Playoffs due to APR violations; Rankings from The Sports Network poll

The 2014 North Carolina A&T Aggies football team represented North Carolina A&T State University as a member of Mid-Eastern Athletic Conference (MEAC) during the 2014 NCAA Division I FCS football season. Led by fourth-year head coach Rod Broadway, the Aggies compiled an overall record of 9–3 with a mark of 6–2 in conference play, placing in a five-way tie for the MEAC title with Bethune–Cookman, Morgan State, North Carolina Central, and South Carolina State. Morgan State received the conference's automatic bid to the NCAA Division I Football Championship. None of the other co-champions earned an at-large bid. North Carolina A&T played home games at Aggie Stadium in Greensboro, North Carolina.

== Before the season ==
During the annual MEAC Media Day, North Carolina A&T were selected to finish 3rd in the conference. The conference also released the 2014 All-MEAC Preseason team, which included 10 North Carolina A&T Aggies. Of the 10 players named, sophomore Running back Tarik Cohen, senior Wide receiver Desmond Lawrence, fifth-year Offensive Lineman Willie Robinson, and fifth-year Linebacker D'Vonte Grant were named to the conference's first team.

=== Recruiting ===
College recruiting information (2014)
Name	Hometown	School	Height	Weight	Commit date
Timadre Abram; DB	Lakeland, FL	Kathleen HS	5 ft 10 in (1.78 m)	165 lb (75 kg)	Feb 5, 2014
Timadre Abram; DB	Recruit ratings: No ratings found				
Shawn Best; OL	New Bern, NC	New Bern HS	6 ft 6 in (1.98 m)	220 lb (100 kg)	Feb 5, 2014
Shawn Best; OL	Recruit ratings: No ratings found				
Marquell Cartwright; RB	High Point, NC	T.W. Andrews HS	5 ft 9 in (1.75 m)	190 lb (86 kg)	Feb 5, 2014
Marquell Cartwright; RB	Recruit ratings: No ratings found				
Jamaal Darden; LB	Raeford, NC	Hoke County	5 ft 10 in (1.78 m)	185 lb (84 kg)	Feb 1, 2014
Jamaal Darden; LB	Recruit ratings: No ratings found				
Courtney Edmonds; LB	Graham, NC	Graham HS	6 ft 3 in (1.91 m)	200 lb (91 kg)	Feb 5, 2014
Courtney Edmonds; LB	Recruit ratings: No ratings found				
Frank Foster; QB	El Cajon, CA	Southwestern College/Valhalla HS	6 ft 0 in (1.83 m)	200 lb (91 kg)	Feb 5, 2014
Frank Foster; QB	Recruit ratings: No ratings found				
Khris Gardin; WR	Morganton, NC	Freedom HS	5 ft 8 in (1.73 m)	160 lb (73 kg)	Feb 5, 2014
Khris Gardin; WR	Recruit ratings: No ratings found				
Leroy Hill; LB	Smithfield, NC	Smithfield-Selma HS	6 ft 4 in (1.93 m)	240 lb (110 kg)	Jun 23, 2014
Leroy Hill; LB	Recruit ratings: No ratings found				
Deion Jones; LB	Belmont, NC	South Point HS	6 ft 1 in (1.85 m)	228 lb (103 kg)	Dec 14, 2013
Deion Jones; LB	Recruit ratings: No ratings found				
Hasaan Klugh; QB	Concord, NC	Central Cabarras HS	6 ft 3 in (1.91 m)	185 lb (84 kg)	Feb 5, 2014
Hasaan Klugh; QB	Recruit ratings: Rivals:				
Julian McKnight; DL	Conyers, GA	Rockdale County HS	6 ft 3 in (1.91 m)	275 lb (125 kg)	Feb 5, 2014
Julian McKnight; DL	Recruit ratings: Rivals:				
Travis McWilliams; WR	Elizabeth City, NC	Northeastern HS	6 ft 1 in (1.85 m)	185 lb (84 kg)	Mar 6, 2014
Travis McWilliams; WR	Recruit ratings: No ratings found				
Joshua Patrick; LB	Decatur, GA	Southwest Dekalb HS	6 ft 0 in (1.83 m)	230 lb (100 kg)	Feb 5, 2014
Joshua Patrick; LB	Recruit ratings: No ratings found				
Lamar Raynard; QB	High Point, NC	T.W. Andrews HS	6 ft 5 in (1.96 m)	190 lb (86 kg)	Feb 5, 2014
Lamar Raynard; QB	Recruit ratings: No ratings found				
Tyshawn Siders; DB	Jacksonville, NC	Jacksonville HS	5 ft 9 in (1.75 m)	175 lb (79 kg)	Feb 5, 2014
Tyshawn Siders; DB	Recruit ratings: No ratings found				
Austin Venable; LS	Greensboro, NC	Southern Guilford HS	5 ft 10 in (1.78 m)	220 lb (100 kg)	Feb 5, 2014
Austin Venable; LS	Recruit ratings: No ratings found				
Amos Williams; DB	DeFuniak Springs, FL	Walton HS	5 ft 8 in (1.73 m)	180 lb (82 kg)	Feb 5, 2014
Amos Williams; DB	Recruit ratings: No ratings found				
Malik Wilson; WR	Burlington, NC	Eastern Alamance HS	6 ft 0 in (1.83 m)	175 lb (79 kg)	Feb 5, 2014
Malik Wilson; WR	Recruit ratings: No ratings found				
Overall recruit ranking:
Note: In many cases, Scout, Rivals, 247Sports, On3, and ESPN may conflict in their listings of height and weight.; In these cases, the average was taken. ESPN grades are on a 100-point scale.; Sources: "2014 Team Ranking". Rivals.com.

== Schedule ==
Date	Time	Opponent	Site	TV	Result	Attendance
August 31	11:45 am	vs. Alabama A&M*	Bright House Networks Stadium; Orlando, FL (MEAC/SWAC Challenge)	ESPN	W 47–13	8,210
September 6	6:00 pm	No. 5 Coastal Carolina*	Aggie Stadium; Greensboro, NC	LTV	L 30–31	14,848
September 13	6:00 pm	at Elon*	Rhodes Stadium; Elon, NC	LTV	W 17–12	7,228
September 20	6:00 pm	Chowan*	Aggie Stadium; Greensboro, NC	LTV	W 59–0	13,184
September 27	1:00 pm	at Howard	William H. Greene Stadium; Washington, DC		W 38–22	7,086
October 4	3:30 pm	vs. South Carolina State	Georgia Dome; Atlanta, GA (Atlanta Football Classic, rivalry)	ESPN3	L 0–13	24,441
October 9	7:30 pm	Hampton	Aggie Stadium; Greensboro, NC	ESPNU	W 31–14	12,947
October 18	2:00 pm	at Delaware State	Alumni Stadium; Dover, DE		W 33–20	6,237
October 25	1:00 pm	Florida A&M^{†}	Aggie Stadium; Greensboro, NC	LTV	W 40–21	21,500
November 8	1:00 pm	Morgan State	Aggie Stadium; Greensboro, NC	LTV	W 45–0	10,139
November 15	2:00 pm	at Savannah State	Ted Wright Stadium; Savannah, GA		W 34–0	1,656
November 22	2:00 pm	at North Carolina Central	O'Kelly–Riddick Stadium; Durham, NC (rivalry)		L 14–21	13,326
*Non-conference game; ^{†}Homecoming; Rankings from The Sports Network Poll released prior to the game; All times are in Eastern time

== Roster ==
2014 North Carolina A&T Aggies Roster (Source)
Wide receivers: 1 Denzel Keyes^{†} – sophomore; 3 Xavier Griffin – sophomore; 5 Desmond Lawrence^{†} – senior; 8 Khris Gardin – freshman; 10 Quentin Todd – (redshirt) senior; 12 Darren Bullock – junior; 16 Michael Weaver – sophomore; 19 Kevin Francis – (redshirt) junior; 80 Joseph Spann – sophomore; 81 Caleb Gabriel – (redshirt) freshman; 82 Keenan Medley – (redshirt) freshman; 85 Travis McWilliams – freshman; 86 Ashanti Foster-Felder – junior; 88 Malik Wilson – freshman; 89 Jonathan Hall – (redshirt) sophomore; Offensive line: 60 Ronald Canty – (redshirt) senior; 61 Josh Mattocks – '' (redshirt) Freshman; 63 Nicholas Dease – ''Junior; 66 Izayah Moore – ''Freshman; 67 Major Kay – (redshirt) sophomore; 68 Charles Jones – sophomore; 70 Brandon Parker – '' (redshirt) Freshman; 71 William Ray Robinson III – (redshirt) senior; 72 Darriel Mack – sophomore; 74 Olin Leak – (redshirt) sophomore; 75 Jessie Dove – freshman; 76 Shawn Best – freshman; 77 Charles "Wes" Cole – sophomore; 78 Antray Small – sophomore; Tight ends: 49 Oluwafemi Bamiro – (redshirt) sophomore; 84 Ty'Shaun McCollum – (redshirt) sophomore; 87 Dequan Swann – (redshirt) junior; Fullbacks: 29 Corbin Martin – freshman; 30 Justin Smith – (redshirt) freshman; 36 Anthony McMinn II – (redshirt) sophomore; 42 Lamarc Watlington – freshman	Quarterbacks: 2 Kwashaun Quick^{†} – junior; 14 Lamar Raynard – freshman; 17 Hassan Klugh – freshman; 18 Frank Foster – junior; Running backs: 20 Daniel Robinson – (redshirt) freshman; 22 Marquell Cartwright – freshman; 28 Tarik Cohen^{†} – sophomore; 32 Cameron Hill – (redshirt) freshman; 39 Marlowe Woods – (redshirt) junior; Defensive line: 40 Daniel Pinnix – senior; 50 Angelo Keyes – (redshirt) sophomore; 51 D'Anthony Ross – sophomore; 55 Michael Neal – junior; 69 Turner Echols – freshman; 90 Malik Hampton-Prioleau – sophomore; 91 Kenneth Melton – (redshirt) freshman; 93 Alva Muldrow – freshman; 95 Julian McKnight – freshman; 96 Matthew Reed – freshman; 97 James Morris – (redshirt) junior; 98 John Williams – junior; 99 Marcus Ragland – (redshirt) sophomore	Linebackers: 4 D'Vonte Grant^{†} – 5th Yr Senior; 24 Lorenz Suttles – sophomore; 45 Joshua Patrick – freshman; 47 Courtney Edmonds – freshman; 53 Gerald Caskey – (redshirt) sophomore; 54 Leroy Hill – freshman; 56 Denzel Jones – (redshirt) junior; 57 Markeiss Blue – freshman; 58 Deion Jones – freshman; 59 Dorian Belcher – (redshirt) sophomore; 62 Darryl Jackson – Unknown; Defensive backs: 7 Donald Mattocks – (redshirt) senior; 9 Zerius Lockhart – (redshirt) freshman; 15 Tard McCoy – (redshirt) freshman; 21 Tony McRae – junior^{†}; 23 Amos Williams – freshman; 25 Jamaal Darden – freshman; 26 Tyree Purcell – freshman; 27 Marquis Boyan – junior; 34 Timadre Abram – freshman; 35 Jerome Beatty – (redshirt) freshman; 37 Landis Shoffner – junior; 48 Jeremy Taylor – (redshirt) freshman; Punters: 44 Dominic Frescura – sophomore; Kickers: 13 Cody Jones^{†} – freshman; 33 Jose Garcia-Camacho – senior; Deep Snapper: 46 Austin Venable – freshman
† Starter at position * Injured; did not play in 2014.

== Coaching staff ==
2014 North Carolina A&T Aggies coaching staff
Head coach: Head coach – Rod Broadway; Offensive coaches: Offensive coordinator/quarterbacks – Rickey Bustle; Offensive Line/Recruiting Coordinator — Keith Wagner; Running backs – Shawn Gibbs; Wide receivers – Chip Hester; Tight end – Colin Williams; Defensive coaches: Defensive coordinator/defensive backs – Sam Washington; Inside linebackers – Charles Cheek; Outside linebackers – Trei Oliver	Administrative staff: Athletic Director (A.D.) – Earl M. Hilton III; Administrative Support Associate for Football — Jeraldine Bailey

== Game summaries ==
=== Alabama A&M ===
Alabama A&M vs. North Carolina A&T (MEAC/SWAC Challenge) – Game Summary

Quarter	1	2	3	4	Total
Aggies	14	24	7	2	47
Bulldogs	6	0	0	7	13

at Bright House Networks Stadium, Orlando, Florida

- Date: August 31, 2014
- Game time: 11:45 AM EDT
- Game weather: 88 °F (31 °C), Sunny
- Game attendance: 8,210
- Referee: Anthony Johnson
- TV: ESPN

Game information

First quarter

- AAMU - Cea Diaz-Ramon 20 yard field goal, 4:56 (AAMU 3—0)
- NCAT - Kwashaun Quick 26 yard run, 4:22 (NCAT 3—7)
- AAMU - Cea Diaz-Ramon 27 yard field goal, 0:16 (AAMU 6—7)
- NCAT - Tony Mcrae 95 yard kickoff return, 0:11 (NCAT 6—14)

Second quarter

- NCAT - Kwashaun Quick 59 yard run, 12:15 (NCAT 6—21)
- NCAT - Tariq Cohen 80 yard run, 10:09 (NCAT 6—28)
- NCAT - Cody Jones 37 yard field goal, 4:48 (NCAT 6—31)
- NCAT - Tariq Cohen 3 yard run, 0:31 (NCAT 6—38)

Third quarter

- NCAT - Marquell Cartwright 5 yard run, 8:07 (NCAT 6—45)

Fourth quarter

- AAMU - Jonat Dorsey 5 yard pass from Brandon Wells, 12:29 (AAMU 13—45)
- NCAT - Team Safety, (AAMU 13—47)

Top Passer

- Brandon Wells (AAMU) – 5/12, 83 YDS 1 TD

Top Rusher

- Tariq Cohen (NCAT) – 10 CAR, 161 YDS 2 TD

Top Receiver

- Jonat Dorsey (AAMU) – 2 REC, 33 YDS 1 TD

With the game's regular venue, Downtown Orlando's Florida Citrus Bowl in the midst of renovations, the 10th annual MEAC/SWAC Challenge was played at Bright House Networks Stadium on the campus of UCF. This was the first meeting between the two teams, and A&T's first time playing in the MEAC/SWAC Challenge. The game also marked the fifth time that A&T head coach Rod Broadway would face Alabama A&M during his coaching career. Broadway has an undefeated record against the Bulldogs, winning all four previous meetings.

Speed became Alabama A&M's undoing in this meeting, as the Aggies sprinted to touchdown runs of 26, 59 and 80 and had a 95-yard kickoff return by junior Tony McRae, all in the first half. Sophomore Tarik Cohen was named the game's MVP after rushing for 161 yards and two touchdowns on 10 carries. Junior quarterback Kwashaun Quick, making his third straight start on opening day, rushed for 94 yards including two touchdowns and threw for 94 yards on 9-for-16 passing. The Bulldogs of Alabama A&M kept NC A&T on the sideline early thanks to a 12-play drive. AAMU's Jaymason Lee's completed pass Tevin McKenzie advanced the ball to the A&T 3-yard line, but it was short of the first down. The Bulldogs settled for a Ceaser Diaz-Ramon 20-yard field goal and a 3-0 lead. Diaz-Ramon's botched onside kick that followed allowed the Aggies to take over at the A&M 37 yard line. After an 11-yard run on a reverse by Desmond Lawrence, Quick was able to make a 26-yard run for a touchdown. The Aggies never trailed again despite Alabama A&M's efforts on its next drive. The Bulldogs again advanced the ball inside the A&T red zone only to settle for another Diaz-Ramon field goal that made it 7-6 with 16 seconds remaining in the first quarter. Once again A&T's speed responded. McRae took the Diaz-Ramon's kickoff for a 95-yard return for a touchdown. The Aggies led at the end of the first quarter 14-6. A&T directed that energy toward the scoreboard while Quick seemed to drain any energy the Bulldogs had left with a 59-yard touchdown run off of a fake to Cohen that left Bulldog defenders frozen. Cohen said that fake aided in his 80-yard touchdown run that gave the Aggies a commanding 28-6 lead. The Aggies’ 34-point win was their most lopsided win over a SWAC opponent in school history, surpassing the Aggies 28-12 win over Grambling in 1991. Fifth-year linebacker D’Vonte Grant and redshirt junior Denzel Jones led the Aggies defensively with 10 tackles apiece.

=== Coastal Carolina ===
#5 Coastal Carolina vs. North Carolina A&T – Game summary

Quarter	1	2	3	4	Total
Chanticleers	0	17	7	7	31
Aggies	7	7	3	13	30

at Aggie Stadium, Greensboro, North Carolina

- Date: September 6, 2014
- Game time: 6:00 PM EDT
- Game weather: 91 °F (33 °C), clear
- Game attendance: 14,848
- Referee: Tra Blake

Game information

First quarter

- NCAT - Kwashaun Quick 2 yard run, 3:00 (NCAT 0—7)

Second quarter

- CCU - Thomas Pauciello 6-yard pass from Alex Ross, 14:50 (tie 7–7)
- CCU - Alex Catron 36-yard field goal, 10:20 (CCU 10—7)
- CCU - De'Angelo Henderson 4-yard run, 7:54 (CCU 17—7)
- NCAT - Tariq Cohen 22-yard run, 4:49 (NCAT 17—14)

Third quarter

- NCAT - Cody Jones 24-yard field goal, 4:53 (TIE 17—17)
- CCU - Aaron Aiken 1-yard run, 1:36 (CCU 24-17)

Fourth quarter

- NCAT - Kwashaun Quick 1-yard run, 12:43 (TIE 24—24)
- NCAT - Kwashaun Quick 29 yard run, 7:16 (NCAT 24—30)
- CCU - Devin Brown 99 yard Kickoff return, 6:58 (CCU 31-30)

Top Passer

- Alex Ross (CCU) – 9/21, 261 YDS 1TD 3 INT

Top Rusher

- Kwashaun Quick (NCAT) – 17 CAR, 96 YDS 3 TD

Top Receiver

- John Isreal (CCU) – 4 REC, 92 YDS

This was the fifth meeting between the Aggies and 5th-ranked Chanticleers, with Coastal Carolina now holding 5–0 record over A&T. Coastal Carolina won the last meeting in 2012, 29–13. The Aggies were the first to score as a 36-yard punt return by freshman Khris Gardin set up a 2-yard touchdown run by quarterback Kwashaun Quick to give the Aggies a 7-0 first-quarter lead. A&T forced three first-quarter turnovers but were not able to turn any of them into points. In the second quarter, Coastal Carolina responded by scoring 17 quick unanswered points on three drives that took only a combined 4:48 off the clock. The Aggies answered as Tarik Cohen broke through the line of scrimmage and made a slide move into the end zone for a 22-yard touchdown run. His run was set up by a 40-yard completion from wide receiver Denzel Keyes to tight end Dequan Swann after Keyes caught a lateral from Quick as the Aggies went into halftime down 17–14.

The Aggies took their first lead of the game in the fourth quarter as Kwashaun Quick avoided a host of Chanticleer tacklers on his way to scoring on a 29-yard touchdown run, which put the Aggies up 30-24 with 7:16 remaining in the game. During the scoring play, Quick's helmet came off, and by rule, he was required to sit out the next play. In the following play, replacement holder and punter Dominic Frescura mishandled a low snap and was eventually wrapped up and sent to the ground by Coastal's Taylor Bagley. Coastal's Devin Brown added pain to A&T's special teams when he returned the ensuing kickoff 99 yards resulting in a touchdown. Alex Catron added the crucial extra point on to the end of Brown's run to give the Chanticleers a 31-30 lead. The Aggies still had a chance to win, when quarterback Kwashaun Quick threw a 19-yard pass to Xavier Griffin, which gave the Aggies a first-and-10 on the Coastal 38-yard line with five minutes to play. But on a 3rd-and-9 from the Coastal 37, Quick was sacked for a 3-yard loss. The Aggies decided to punt on fourth down with less than four minutes remaining, and the Chanticleers ran out the clock for the win.

=== Elon ===
North Carolina A&T vs. Elon – Game Summary

Quarter	1	2	3	4	Total
Aggies	10	0	0	7	17
Phoenix	3	6	3	0	12

at Rhodes Stadium, Elon, North Carolina

- Date: September 13, 2014
- Game time: 6:00 PM EDT
- Game weather: 91 °F (33 °C), Clear
- Game attendance: 7,228
- Referee: Warren Gillis

Game information

First quarter

- ELON - John Gallagher 20 yard field goal, 7:24 (Elon 0—3)
- NCAT - Cody Jones 24 yard field goal, 4:52 (TIE 3—3)
- NCAT - Denzel Keyes 2 yard pass from Tarik Cohen, 0:28 (NCAT 10—3)

Second quarter

- ELON - John Gallagher 23 yard field goal, 6:40 (NCAT 10—6)
- ELON - John Gallagher 32 yard field goal, 0:23 (NCAT 10—9)

Third quarter

- ELON - John Gallagher 22 yard field goal, 8:58 (Elon 10—12)

Fourth quarter

- NCAT - Tarik Cohen 81 yard run, 11:40 (NCAT 17—12)

Top Passer

- Mike Quinn (ELON)– 20/40 (2 INT), 253 YDS

Top Rusher

- Tarik Cohen (NCAT)– 20 CAR, 234 YDS

Top Receiver

- Andre Davis (ELON) – 7 REC, 90 YDS

This was the 10th meeting between A&T and nearby In-state FCS opponent Elon. The Aggies hold a 6-4 all-time record against the Phoenix, with a 23-10 in front of a Home crowd in 2013.

The Aggie defense maintained, as the Phoenix were unable to score a touchdown the entire game, despite the advancing to the Aggies 3, 5, 11, 4, 6-yard lines on five occasions. Elon kicker John Gallagher provided all the scoring for the Phoenix by scoring on 4 of 5 of the Phoenix’ s trips inside the Aggies 10. Running Back Tarik Cohen rushed for a career-high 234 yards and ran for a game-winning 81-yard touchdown in the fourth quarter. It was the second 200-yard rushing performance of Cohen's career, and his fourth straight 100-plus rushing game dating back to last season.

=== Chowan ===
Chowan vs. North Carolina A&T – Game Summary

Quarter	1	2	3	4	Total
Hawks	0	0	0	0	0
Aggies	10	42	0	7	59

at Aggie Stadium, Greensboro, North Carolina

- Date: September 20, 2014
- Game time: 6:00 PM EDT
- Game weather: 79 °F (26 °C), Clear
- Game attendance: 13,184
- Referee: Flemon Williams

Game information

First quarter

- NCAT - Cody Jones 24 yard field goal, 9:18 (NCAT 0—3)
- NCAT - Tariq Cohen 4 yard run, 2:45 (NCAT 0—10)

Second quarter

- NCAT - Kwashaun Quick 12 yard run, 12:50 (NCAT 0—17)
- NCAT - Xavier Griffen 55 yard pass from Kwashaun Quick, 9:58 (NCAT 0—24)
- NCAT - Anthony McMinn 22 yard pass from Kwashaun Quick, 7:22 (NCAT 0—31)
- NCAT - Tariq Cohen 11 yard run, 5:17 (NCAT 0—38)
- NCAT - Tariq Cohen 7 yard run, 4:15 (NCAT 0—45)
- NCAT - Desmond Lawrence 15 yard pass from Kwashaun Quick, 1:06 (NCAT 0—52)

Third quarter
Fourth quarter

- NCAT - Marquis Boyan, 51 yard fumble recovery (NCAT 0—59)

Top Passer

- Jaymason lee – 9/21, 129 YDS

Top Rusher

- Dontravious wilson – 21 CAR, 34 YDS

Top Receiver

- J.J. Worton – 5 REC, 83 YDS

This was the first meeting between the Aggies and Hawks

=== Howard ===
North Carolina A&T vs. Howard – Game Summary

Quarter	1	2	3	4	Total
Aggies	21	7	7	3	38
Bison	7	9	6	0	22

at Greene Stadium, Washington, D.C.

- Date: September 27, 2014
- Game time: 1:00 PM EDT
- Game weather: 77 °F (25 °C), Clear
- Game attendance: 7,086
- Referee: Tra Blake

Game information

First quarter

- HOW - Gregg McGhee 20 yard run, 12:27 (HOW 0—7)
- NCAT - Desmond Lawrence 46 yard pass from Kwashaun Quick, 7:55 (TIE 7—7)
- NCAT - Kwashaun Quick 3 yard pass from Caleb Gabriel, 2:26 (NCAT 14—7)
- NCAT - Michael Cartwright 11 yard run, 0:20 (NCAT 21—7)

Second quarter

- NCAT - Darren Bullock 46 yard pass from Kwashaun Quick, 9:08 (NCAT 28—7)
- HOW - Aquaniu Freeman 3 yard run, 07:01 (NCAT 28—13)
- HOW - John Fleck 19 yard field goal, 00:00 (NCAT 28—16)
- NCAT - Tariq Cohen 3 yard run, 0:31 (NCAT 6—38)

Third quarter

- HOW - Justin Chaney 1 yard pass from Gregg McGhee, 03:25 (NCAT 28—22)
- NCAT - Michael Cartwright 16 yard run, 01:00 (NCAT 35—22)

Fourth quarter

- NCAT - Cody Jones 40 yard field goal, 02:10 (NCAT 38—22)

Top Passer

- Gregg McGhee (HOW) – 20/44 (1 INT), 237 YDS

Top Rusher

- Michael Cartwright (NCAT) – 33 CAR, 135 YDS

Top Receiver

- Desmond Lawrence (NCAT) – 5 REC, 86 YDS

=== South Carolina State ===
South Carolina State vs. North Carolina A&T (Atlanta Football Classic) – Game Summary

Quarter	1	2	3	4	Total
Bulldogs	0	7	0	6	13
Aggies	0	0	0	0	0

at Georgia Dome, Atlanta, Georgia

- Date: October 4, 2014
- Game time: 3:30 PM EDT
- Game weather: N/A, Inside
- Game attendance: 24,441
- Referee: Donnell Leathers
- TV: ESPN3

Game information

First quarter

None

Second quarter

- SCSU - Jalen Simmons 2 yard run, 14:56 (SCSU 7—0)

Third quarter

None

Fourth quarter

- SCSU - Adri Kollock Jr. 1 yard run, 02:30 (AAMU 13—45)
- NCAT - Team Safety, (AAMU 13—47)

Top Passer

- Jaymason lee – 9/21, 129 YDS

Top Rusher

- Dontravious wilson – 21 CAR, 34 YDS

Top Receiver

- J.J. Worton – 5 REC, 83 YDS

=== Hampton ===
Hampton vs. North Carolina A&T – Game Summary

Quarter	1	2	3	4	Total
Pirates	0	17	7	7	31
Aggies	7	7	3	13	30

at Aggie Stadium, Greensboro, North Carolina

- Date: October 9, 2014
- Game time: 7:30 PM EDT
- Game weather: 91 °F (33 °C), Clear
- Game attendance: 14,848
- Referee: Tra Blake

Game information

First quarter

- AAMU - Cea Diaz-Ramon 20 yard field goal, 4:56 (AAMU 3—0)
- NCAT - Kwashaun Quick 26 yard run, 4:22 (NCAT 3—7)
- AAMU - Cea Diaz-Ramon 27 yard field goal, 0:16 (AAMU 6—7)
- NCAT - Tony Mcrae 95 yard kickoff return, 0:11 (NCAT 6—14)

Second quarter

- NCAT - Kwashaun Quick 59 yard run, 12:15 (NCAT 6—21)
- NCAT - Tariq Cohen 80 yard run, 10:09 (NCAT 6—28)
- NCAT - Cody Jones 37 yard field goal, 4:48 (NCAT 6—31)
- NCAT - Tariq Cohen 3 yard run, 0:31 (NCAT 6—38)

Third quarter

- NCAT - Marquell Cartwright 5 yard run, 8:07 (NCAT 6—45)

Fourth quarter

- AAMU - J. Dorsey 5 yard pass from Brandon Wells, 12:29 (AAMU 13—45)
- NCAT - Team Safety, (AAMU 13—47)

Top Passer

- Jaymason lee – 9/21, 129 YDS

Top Rusher

- Dontravious wilson – 21 CAR, 34 YDS

Top Receiver

- J.J. Worton – 5 REC, 83 YDS

=== Delaware State ===
North Carolina A&T vs. Delaware State – Game Summary

Quarter	1	2	3	4	Total
Hawks	0	17	7	7	31
Aggies	7	7	3	13	30

at Alumni Stadium, Dover, Delaware

- Date: October 18, 2014
- Game time: 2:00 PM EDT
- Game weather: 91 °F (33 °C), Clear
- Game attendance: 14,848
- Referee: Tra Blake

Game information

First quarter

- AAMU - Cea Diaz-Ramon 20 yard field goal, 4:56 (AAMU 3—0)
- NCAT - Kwashaun Quick 26 yard run, 4:22 (NCAT 3—7)
- AAMU - Cea Diaz-Ramon 27 yard field goal, 0:16 (AAMU 6—7)
- NCAT - Tony Mcrae 95 yard kickoff return, 0:11 (NCAT 6—14)

Second quarter

- NCAT - Kwashaun Quick 59 yard run, 12:15 (NCAT 6—21)
- NCAT - Tariq Cohen 80 yard run, 10:09 (NCAT 6—28)
- NCAT - Cody Jones 37 yard field goal, 4:48 (NCAT 6—31)
- NCAT - Tariq Cohen 3 yard run, 0:31 (NCAT 6—38)

Third quarter

- NCAT - Marquell Cartwright 5 yard run, 8:07 (NCAT 6—45)

Fourth quarter

- AAMU - J. Dorsey 5 yard pass from Brandon Wells, 12:29 (AAMU 13—45)
- NCAT - Team Safety, (AAMU 13—47)

Top Passer

- Jaymason lee – 9/21, 129 YDS

Top Rusher

- Dontravious wilson – 21 CAR, 34 YDS

Top Receiver

- J.J. Worton – 5 REC, 83 YDS

=== Florida A&M ===
Florida A&M vs. North Carolina A&T – Game Summary

Quarter	1	2	3	4	Total
Rattlers	7	7	0	7	21
Aggies	7	13	13	7	40

at Aggie Stadium, Greensboro, North Carolina

- Date: October 25, 2014
- Game time: 1:00 PM EDT
- Game weather: 58 °F (14 °C), Few Clouds
- Game attendance: 21,500

Game information

First quarter

- FAMU - Lemond Buice 11 Yd pass from Damien Fleming, 7:45 (FAMU 7-0)
- NCAT - Denzel Keyes 3 Yd pass from Kwashaun Quick, 2:17 (TIE 7-7)

Second quarter

- NCAT - Cody Jones 28 yard field goal, 13:30 (NCAT 7—10)
- NCAT - Marquell Cartwright 1 Yd Run, 8:20 (NCAT 7-17)
- FAMU - Alonzo Palmer-Hicks 21 Yd pass from Damien Fleming, 4:53 (NCAT 14-17)
- NCAT - Cody Jones 47 yard field goal, 0:32 (NCAT 14—20)

Third quarter

- NCAT - Denzel Keyes 73 Yd pass from Kwashaun Quick, 8:27 (NCAT 14-27)
- NCAT - Denzel Keyes 21 Yd pass from Kwashaun Quick, 0:28 (NCAT 14-33)

Fourth quarter

- NCAT - Tarik Cohen 3 Yd Run, 14:54 (NCAT 14-40)
- FAMU - Casey Glines 31 Yd pass from Damien Fleming (NCAT 21-40)

Top Passer

Kwashaun Quick (NCAT) - 233 YDS, 3 TD

Top Rusher

Tarik Cohen (NCAT) - 16 CAR, 55 YDS, 1 TD

Top Receiver

Denzel Keys (NCAT) - 5 REC, 129 YDS, 3 TD

The Aggies fell behind early by a touchdown, as Florida A&M went 75 yards on 11 plays capped by a Damien Fleming touchdown pass to Lemond Buice. A&T's used of a 3-yard lob by Quarterback Kwashaun Quick, and a 1-yard plunge by Marquell Cartwright would take the Aggies to a 20-14 lead at the half.

=== Morgan State ===
Morgan State vs. North Carolina A&T – Game Summary

Quarter	1	2	3	4	Total
Bears	0	0	0	0	0
Aggies	0	0	0	0	0

at Aggie Stadium, Greensboro, North Carolina

- Date: November 8, 2014
- Game time: 1:00 PM EDT
- Game weather: 0 °F (−18 °C), Clear

Game information

First quarter
Second quarter
Third quarter
Fourth quarter

Top Passer
Top Rusher
Top Receiver

=== Savannah State ===
North Carolina A&T vs. Savannah State – Game Summary

Quarter	1	2	3	4	Total
Aggies	0	10	21	3	34
Tigers	0	0	0	0	0

at Ted Wright Stadium, Savannah, Georgia

- Date: November 15, 2014
- Game time: 2:00 PM EDT
- Game weather: 52 °F (11 °C), Clear
- Game attendance: 1,656
- Referee: Steve Kinney

Game information

First quarter

none

Second quarter

- NCAT - Dequan Swann 17 yard pass from Kwashaun Quick, 7:07 (NCAT 7—0)
- NCAT - Cody Jones 33 yard field goal, 1:55 (NCAT 10—0)

Third quarter

- NCAT - Tarik Cohen 17 yard run, 13:17 (NCAT 17—0)
- NCAT - Tarik Cohen 2 yard run, 11:09 (NCAT 24—0)
- NCAT - Tarik Cohen 54 yard run, 2:18 (NCAT 31—0)

Fourth quarter

- NCAT - Cody Jones 27 yard field goal, 9:55 (NCAT 34—0)

Top Passer

- Kwashaun Quick (NCAT) – 9/18, 135 YDS 1 TD

Top Rusher

- Tarik Cohen (NCAT) – 13 CAR, 115 YDS 3 TD

Top Receiver

- Denzel Keyes (NCAT) – 2 REC, 57 YDS 0 TD

This was the second meeting between the Aggies and the Tigers. The Aggies won the previous meeting 41-14 in front of a home crowd inside Aggie Stadium. For A&T's defense, the victory secured the team's second straight shutout of the season, and the first time since 1954 the Aggies have put together two consecutive shutouts. With the win, the Aggies clinched the MEAC championship for the first time since 2003, and guaranteed at least a share of the conference title.

=== North Carolina Central ===
#24 North Carolina A&T vs. North Carolina Central – Game Summary

Quarter	1	2	3	4	Total
#24 Aggies	7	0	7	0	14
Eagles	0	7	14	0	21

at O'Kelly–Riddick Stadium, Durham, North Carolina

- Date: November 22, 2014
- Game time: 2:00 PM EDT
- Game weather: 45 °F (7 °C), Sunny and Cool
- Game attendance: 13,326
- Referee: Donn. Leathers

Game information

First quarter

- NCAT - Tarik Cohen 38 yard run, 12:46 (NCAT 7—0)

Second quarter

- NCCU - Jazz King 10 yard pass from Malcolm Bell, 4:18 (TIE 7—7)

Third quarter

- NCCU - Andre Clarke 3 yard run, 12:42 (NCCU 7—14)
- NCCU - Malcolm Bell 37 yard run, 6:45 (NCCU 7—21)
- NCAT - Tarik Cohen 3 yard run, 0:45 (NCCU 14—21)

Fourth quarter

None

Top Passer

- Malcolm Bell (NCCU) – 14/21, 121 YDS 1 TD

Top Rusher

- Tariq Cohen (NCAT) – 20 CAR, 203 YDS 2 TD

Top Receiver

- Anas Hasic (NCCU) – 5 REC, 33 YDS 0 TD

This game marked the 86th meeting between the North Carolina Central and the NC A&T Aggies and is part of the multi-sport rivalry between the two. Commonly referred to as the "Aggie–Eagle classic," this particular rivalry is the longest-running for both schools and dates back to the 1920s. A&T came into the 2014 contest nationally ranked for the first time since 2003; and on a three-year winning streak over the North Carolina Central, including a 28–0 victory the previous year. The contest also had conference championship implications for both teams as the Aggies, who clinched the MEAC championship after defeating the Savannah State Tigers the week prior, needed the victory to secure the MEAC Championship outright and the Eagles needed a victory to secure a share of the title. Attendance for this game was 13,326, which is 2,726 more than the official stadium capacity for O'Kelly–Riddick Stadium.

== Ranking movements ==
Ranking movements Legend: ██ Increase in ranking ██ Decrease in ranking — = Not ranked RV = Received votes
	Week														
Poll	Pre	1	2	3	4	5	6	7	8	9	10	11	12	13	Final
Sports Network	RV	RV	RV	RV	RV	RV	—	RV	RV	RV	RV	RV	24	RV	
Coaches	—	RV	RV	RV	RV	RV	—	—	RV	RV	RV	RV	RV		
Sheridan Broadcasting Network (SBN)		5			3	3	4		2						
BoxToRow Media Poll and Coaches Poll (BTR)	5	5	5						2	1	1	1	1	3	3
Heritage Sports Radio Network (HSRN)	6	4	4	2	1	1	5	2	2	1	1	1	1	1	2

== Postseason ==
As the 2014 college football season neared the end, many organizations began to announce finalists and winners of various past-season awards. Aggie players and coaches appeared on many of these lists. As a team, the Aggies lead the nation in takeaways this season. Additionally, A&T were second in the nation for interceptions, third in scoring defense, third in team passing efficiency defense, fifth in turnover margin and seventh in red zone defense.

Head coach Rod Broadway was one of 20 finalists who have been nominated for the 2014 Eddie Robinson Award, which is awarded to the top head coach in the NCAA Division I Football Championship Subdivision by a panel of sports information directors, broadcasters, writers and other dignitaries. This marked the second time in Broadway's career that he had been nominated for the award.

Several players for the Aggies were also honored. A&T sophomore running back Tarik Cohen was named MEAC co-offensive player of the year. Cohen led the MEAC in rushing and recorded his second straight 1,000 yard season with 1,340 total yards. In addition, Cohen was ranked 15th in the nation in rushing. He also led the conference with 121.8 rushing yards per game, 197 carries, with 15 touchdowns in 11 games. In addition, Cohen led the conference in scoring, with 96 points; touchdowns, with 16, and finished second in all-purpose yardage with 143.4 average yards per game. This season, Cohen also earned the Sports Networks’ Player of the Week honor once and received the MEAC offensive player of the week honor twice. In addition to Cohen, Redshirt Senior Left Guard William Ray Robinson III, Senior Linebacker D'Vonte Grant, and Redshirt Senior Cornerback Donald Mattocks earned BOXTOROW Black College All-American honors. Grant, Mattocks, Cohen, and Junior Defensive Back Tony McRae also earned Beyond Sports Network FCS All-American recognition, while Redshirt Senior Offensive Lineman Ronald Canty earned FCS All-American honors from the American Football Coaches Association.

The following A&T players were also named to the All–MEAC First, Second, and Third Teams:

All-MEAC First Team
- Tarik Cohen, So., RB
- Ronald Canty, R-Sr., C
- William Ray Robinson III, R-Sr., OL
- D'Vonte Grant, Sr., LB
- Tony McRae, Jr., DB
- Donald Mattocks, R-Sr., DB
- Cody Jones, So., PK

All-MEAC Second Team
- Marquis Ragland, R-So., DL
- Tony McRae, Jr., RS

All-MEAC Third Team
- Kwashaun Quick, Jr., QB
- Desmond Lawrence, Sr., WS
- Brandon Parker, R-Fr., OL

=== 2015 NFL draft ===
The 2015 NFL draft was held on April 30– May 2, 2015 at the Auditorium Theatre and in Grant Park in Chicago Illinois. The following A&T players were either selected or signed as undrafted free agents following the draft.

Player	Position	Round	Overall pick	NFL team
Desmond Lawrence	WR	—-	Undrafted FA	Detroit Lions
