= Tony McRae (American football) =

American football player (born 1993)

North Carolina A&T
- Title: Cornerbacks coach

Personal information
- Born: May 3, 1993 (age 33); McColl, South Carolina, U.S.
- Listed height: 5 ft 10 in (1.78 m)
- Listed weight: 185 lb (84 kg)

Career information
- High school: Scotland (Laurinburg, North Carolina)
- College: North Carolina A&T
- NFL draft: 2016: undrafted

Career history

Playing
- Oakland Raiders (2016)*; Cincinnati Bengals (2016)*; Baltimore Ravens (2017); Buffalo Bills (2017); Cincinnati Bengals (2017–2019); Detroit Lions (2020)
- * Offseason or practice squad member only

Coaching
- North Carolina Central (2022–2025) Cornerbacks cocah

Awards and highlights
- Black college football national championship (2015); 1st Team Boxtorow All-American (2015); 1st Team All-MEAC Defensive Back (2015); 2nd Team All MEAC Return Specialist (2015); 2nd Team BSN All-American (2015)

Career NFL statistics
- Total tackles: 40
- Forced fumbles: 2
- Pass deflections: 2
- Stats at Pro Football Reference

Tony McRae (born May 3, 1993) is an American college football coach and former cornerback. He is the cornerbacks coach for North Carolina A&T, a position he has held since 2025. He played college football at North Carolina A&T, and signed with the Oakland Raiders as an undrafted free agent in 2016.

== Early life ==
McRae attended Scotland High School, in Laurinburg, North Carolina where he played varsity football and basketball. During his senior year, McRae helped lead the Fighting Scotts to a 14–0 undefeated season and the 2011 NCHSAA 4A State football championship. McRae's performance earned a place on the 2011 All-Cape Fear Regional Team as he was the leading rusher among NC state champion teams with 1,835 yards and 32 touchdowns.

== College career ==
McRae accepted an athletic scholarship to attend North Carolina A&T State University, where he played for coach Rod Broadway's as a member of his first NC A&T Aggies football recruiting class.

=== 2012 season ===
As a true freshman, McRae played in all 11 of the Aggie's games, and started in 3 of them. He would get his first start at cornerback to replace starting left cornerback Deji Olatoye who moved to free safety to replace of an injured Isaiah Martin. McRae would finish the 2012 season with a total of 23 tackles, 14 of them solo and 9 assisted; 4 broken up passes and 9 Kick returns.

=== 2013 season ===
McRae began his sophomore with a 4 solo, 1 pass breakup and a 91-yard kickoff return for a touchdown in the season opener against Appalachian State. The Aggies would go on to upset Appalachian State 24–21, resulting in North Carolina A&T's first win over the mountaineers since 1993. Of the 11 games he played in that season, McRae would total 11 solo tackles, 1 assist, 2 pass breakups, 3 defended passes and 1 interception.

=== 2014 season ===
For his Junior season McRae would start in all 12 games and opened the season with a 95-yard kickoff return for a touchdown against Alabama A&M in the 2014 MEAC/SWAC Challenge. Against Elon, McRae put up a career high 9 tackles and 5 defended passes. He ended the season with 62 total tackles, 46 of them being unassisted, 5 interceptions, 16 passes defended and 14 kickoffs returned for 360 total yards and 1 touchdown. McRae was ranked 13th in the nation in passes defended, 15th in interceptions and 4th in kickoff return touchdowns.

=== 2015 season ===
Starting in all 12 games played, McRae has a season best performance against Delaware state in which he returned a kickoff for 75 yards for a touchdown, earned 6 tackles and 1 interception. He would finish the season leading the Aggies with 55 Tackles, 14 assists, 8 Pass defended, 22 kick returns for 622 yards and 2 touchdowns, and 3 interceptions. McRae's performance earned him first-team All MEAC and Boxtorow first-team All-American recognition.

=== College statistics ===
Season	GP	Tackles							Interceptions					Fumbles				
Season	GP	Solo	Ast	Cmb	TfL	Yds	Sck	Yds	Int	Yds	BU	PD	QBH	FR	Yds	TD	FF	Blk
2012	11	14	9	23	0.5	2	0.0	0	0	4	4	0	1	0	0	0	0	0
2013	11	11	2	13	0	0	0.0	0	1	0	2	3	0	0	0	0	0	0
2014	12	46	16	62	2	8	0.0	0	5	84	11	16	0	0	0	0	0	0
2015	12	41	14	55	4	8	1.5	4	3	21	5	8	0	0	0	0	0	0
Career	46	112	41	153	6.5	18	1.5	4	9	109	22	27	1	0	0	0	0	0

== Professional career ==
According to ESPN, McRae was ranked the 85th best cornerback entering the 2016 NFL draft.

Pre-draft measurables
Height	Weight	40-yard dash	10-yard split	20-yard split	20-yard shuttle	Three-cone drill	Vertical jump	Broad jump	Bench press
5 ft 9 in (1.75 m)	178 lb (81 kg)	4.56 s	1.59 s	2.60 s	4.33 s	7.55 s	36.5 in (0.93 m)	10 ft 5 in (3.18 m)	13 reps
All values were taken at NC A&T Pro Day.

=== Oakland Raiders ===
McRae was signed by the Oakland Raiders as an undrafted free agent on May 10, 2016. He was waived on May 16, 2016.

=== Cincinnati Bengals ===
On August 9, 2016, McRae signed with the Cincinnati Bengals. He was waived on September 3, 2016, and was signed to the practice squad the next day. He was released on September 16, 2016, but was later re-signed on November 29, 2016. He signed a reserve/future contract with the Bengals on January 2, 2017.

On September 2, 2017, McRae was waived by the Bengals.

=== Baltimore Ravens ===
On September 5, 2017, McRae was signed to the Baltimore Ravens' practice squad. He was promoted to the active roster on September 16, 2017. He was waived by the Ravens on October 21, 2017.

=== Buffalo Bills ===
On October 23, 2017, McRae was claimed off waivers by the Buffalo Bills, but was released two days later.

=== Cincinnati Bengals (second stint) ===
On October 27, 2017, McRae was signed to the Bengals' practice squad. He was promoted to the active roster on December 9, 2017.

On September 13, 2018, in a game against the Baltimore Ravens, McRae recorded 2 forced fumbles.

In 2019, he was re-signed for one year.

On December 22, 2019, in a game against the Miami Dolphins, McRae suffered a concussion.

=== Detroit Lions ===
On March 24, 2020, McRae signed with the Detroit Lions. On November 8, 2020, he suffered a right knee injury in a game against the Minnesota Vikings. On November 9, 2020, McRae was placed on injured reserve.

In the 2021 off-season, McRae became a free agent.

== Coaching career ==
In 2022, McRae was hired as the cornerbacks coach for North Carolina Central.
