= Mid-Eastern Athletic Conference =

American collegiate athletic conference

- Association: NCAA
- Founded: 1970
- Commissioner: Sonja O. Stills (since 2022)
- Sports fielded: 16; men's: 6; women's: 10
- Division: Division I
- Subdivision: FCS
- No. of teams: 8
- Headquarters: Norfolk, Virginia, U.S.
- Region: South Atlantic, Middle Atlantic
- Broadcaster: ESPN
- Website: meacsports.com

Locations
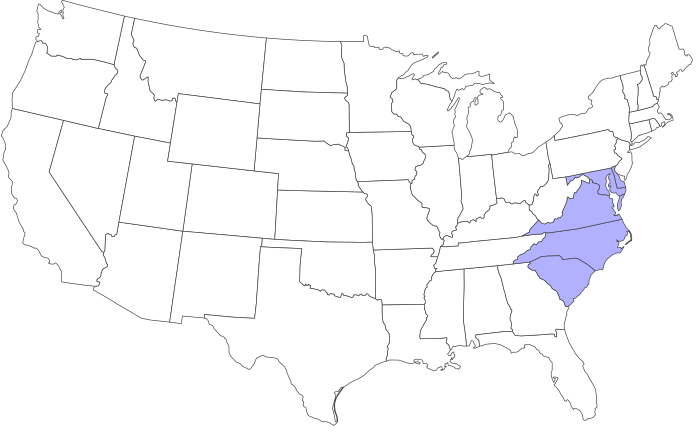

The Mid-Eastern Athletic Conference (MEAC /ˈmiːæk/ MEE-ak) is a collegiate athletic conference whose full members are historically black colleges and universities (HBCUs) in the Southeastern and the Mid-Atlantic United States. It participates in the National Collegiate Athletic Association (NCAA) Division I, and in football, in the Football Championship Subdivision (FCS).

Currently, the MEAC has automatic qualifying bids for NCAA postseason play in men's basketball (since 1981), women's basketball (since 1982), softball (since 1995), men's and women's tennis (since 1998), and volleyball (since 1994). Bowling was officially sanctioned as a MEAC-governed sport in 1999. Before that season, the MEAC was the first conference to secure NCAA sanctioning for women's bowling by adopting the club sport prior to the 1996–97 school year.

== History ==
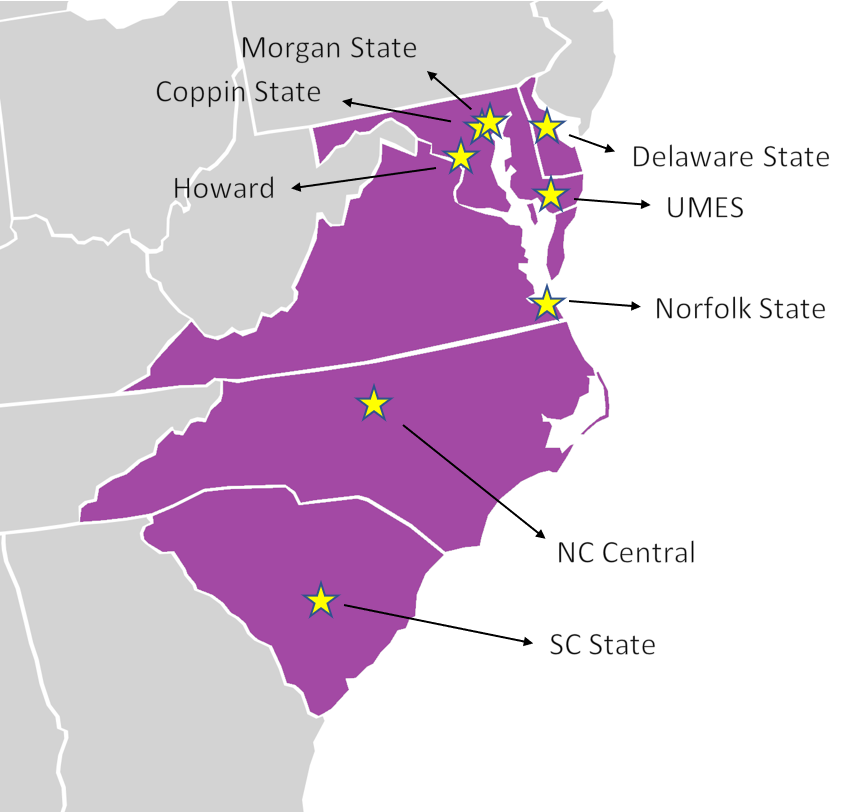
Locations of eight Mid-Eastern Athletic Conference members

In 1969, a group whose members were long associated with interscholastic athletics met in Durham, North Carolina for the purpose of discussing the organization of a new conference. After the formulation of a committee, and their research reported, seven institutions, Delaware State University, Howard University, University of Maryland Eastern Shore, Morgan State University, North Carolina A&T State University, North Carolina Central University and South Carolina State College, agreed to become the Mid-Eastern Athletic Conference. South Carolina State had been a longtime member of the Southern Intercollegiate Athletic Conference, while the other charter members had been longtime members of the Central Intercollegiate Athletic Association.

The conference's main goals were to establish and supervise an intercollegiate athletic program among a group of educational institutions that shared the same academic standards and philosophy of co-curricular activities and seek status as a Division I conference for all of its sports.

The conference was confirmed in 1970, and had its first season of competition in football in 1971. The MEAC has had three full-time commissioners. In 1978, the MEAC selected its first full-time commissioner, Kenneth A. Free, who served as commissioner until he resigned in 1995. He was succeeded by Charles S. Harris, who served at the position until 2002. On September 1, 2002, Dennis E. Thomas became the conference's commissioner. He retired on December 31, 2021. Sonja O. Stills became the first female commissioner of the MEAC on January 1, 2022. She is also the only female commissioner of a Division I HBCU athletic conference.

The MEAC experienced its first expansion in 1979 when Bethune–Cookman College (now Bethune–Cookman University) and Florida A&M University were admitted as new members. That same year, founding members Morgan State University, North Carolina Central University and University of Maryland Eastern Shore withdrew from the conference. All three schools eventually returned to the conference; Maryland Eastern Shore rejoined in 1981, Morgan State in 1984, and North Carolina Central in 2010.

On June 8, 1978, the MEAC was classified as a Division I conference by the NCAA. Prior to that year, the league operated as a Division II conference. The following month the MEAC received an automatic qualification to the NCAA Division I Men's Basketball Championship.

In 1984, membership in the MEAC again changed, as Florida A&M chose to leave. The university returned to the conference two years later. Coppin State College, now Coppin State University, joined the conference in 1985. The MEAC found some stability in membership with the addition of two HBCUs in Virginia, Hampton University and Norfolk State University in 1995 and 1997, respectively. For the next ten years, the MEAC remained an 11-member conference. In 2007, former CIAA member Winston-Salem State University was granted membership, but announced on September 11, 2009, that it would return to Division II at the end of 2009–10 and apply to return to the CIAA before ever becoming a full member of the MEAC.

North Carolina Central University rejoined the conference effective July 1, 2010. NCCU was one of seven founding member institutions of the MEAC, but withdrew from the conference in 1979, opting to remain a Division II member when the conference reclassified to Division I.

Savannah State University was announced as the newest member of the MEAC on March 10, 2010. Savannah State originally applied for membership into the MEAC in 2006 but faced an NCAA probationary period soon after. Membership was then deferred until the completion of the imposed probation period, which ended in May 2009. Savannah State then resubmitted their application for membership again in 2009 and was finally granted probationary membership status. On September 8, 2011, the university was confirmed as a full MEAC member.

While the MEAC has had no new full members since then, the conference added an associate member in 2014 when Augusta University, then known as Georgia Regents University, a Division II institution with Division I programs in men's and women's golf, joined for men's golf. Augusta became the MEAC's first associate member and first non-HBCU with any type of membership. The conference has since added two more non-HBCU associate members, with Monmouth University and the University of Alabama at Birmingham (UAB) joining for bowling in 2018.

In April 2017, Savannah State announced that it would drop to Division II effective with the 2019–20 school year. In November 2017, Hampton announced they would leave the MEAC to join the Big South Conference beginning with the 2018–19 season.

In February 2020 North Carolina A&T announced departing MEAC to join Big South Conference effective July 2021. Within few months, in June 2020, Florida A&M and Bethune-Cookman also announced that they will leave the MEAC and join the SWAC starting in July 2021. As a result, the MEAC will have eight members remaining for 2021, with only six of its members sponsoring football. The MEAC has hired a consulting firm to help assess its current schools and to help it identify potential institutions for addition to the conference. The conference plans to operate with eight current members, starting 2021 until further expansion, in a compact geographical footprint removing North and South divisions.

In May 2021, multiple websites that report on HBCU sports indicated that the MEAC had reached out to two Division II HBCUs about their interest in transitioning to D-I and joining the MEAC. Kentucky State University and Virginia State University, respectively members of the Southern Intercollegiate Athletic Conference and Central Intercollegiate Athletic Association, confirmed that they had discussed possible membership with the MEAC and had commissioned feasibility studies on moving to Division I. Officials at both schools stated that they were considering the move, but would not commit to any change. One report also indicated that Chicago State University, a predominantly African-American school but not an HBCU, had lobbied the MEAC regarding membership. CSU was scheduled to leave the Western Athletic Conference, a league in which it is a major geographic outlier, in July 2022 to become an independent. According to this report, the MEAC had offered CSU associate membership in one sport, but was lukewarm to CSU becoming a full member because it does not sponsor football and is well outside the MEAC's geographic footprint.

In July 2022, the Northeast Conference (NEC) announced a partnership with the MEAC in which MEAC schools sponsoring baseball and men's and women's golf would become NEC affiliate members in their respective sports beginning in the 2022-23 season.

The MEAC announced in June 2026 that it would add two women's sports in 2026–27—flag football and golf. It became the first Division I conference to officially sponsor flag football.

== Member schools ==
=== Current full members ===
Institution	Location	Founded	Type	Enrollment	Nickname	Joined (Note: Represents the calendar year when fall sports competition begins.)	Colors
Coppin State University	Baltimore, Maryland	1900	Public	2,724	Eagles	1985	
Delaware State University	Dover, Delaware	1891	Public	6,200	Hornets	1970	
Howard University	Washington, D.C.	1867	Private	12,065	Bison & Lady Bison	1970	
University of Maryland Eastern Shore	Princess Anne, Maryland (Note: The UMES campus has a Princess Anne mailing address, but completely lies in unincorporated Somerset County.)	1886	Public	2,333	Hawks	1970; 1981 (Note: Maryland Eastern Shore (UMES) left the MEAC after the 1978–79 season, while competing for football as an associate member during the 1979 fall season (1979–80 school year) before dropping the sport altogether. UMES rejoined the MEAC effective with the 1981–82 school year as a full member that no longer had a football program.)	
Morgan State University	Baltimore, Maryland	1867	Public	7,763	Bears & Lady Bears	1970; 1984 (Note: Morgan State left the MEAC after the 1978–79 school year, while competing for football as an associate member during the 1979 fall season (1979–80 school year), before rejoining in 1984–85.)	
Norfolk State University	Norfolk, Virginia	1935	Public	5,616	Spartans	1997	
North Carolina Central University	Durham, North Carolina	1910	Public	7,553	Eagles	1970; 2010 (Note: North Carolina Central left the MEAC after the 1978–79 school year, while competing for football as an associate member during the 1979 fall season (1979–80 school year), before rejoining in 2010–11.)	
South Carolina State University	Orangeburg, South Carolina	1896	Public	2,649	Bulldogs & Lady Bulldogs	1970	

=== Associate members ===
Institution	Location	Founded	Enrollment	Nickname	Joined (Note: Represents the calendar year when fall sports competition begins.)	Colors	MEAC sport(s)	Primary conference
Gardner–Webb University	Boiling Springs, North Carolina	1905	3,594	Runnin'; Bulldogs	2026		Women's flag football	Big South (BSC)
Mississippi Valley State University	Itta Bena, Mississippi (Note: Mississippi Valley State (MVSU) has an Itta Bena mailing address, but is located in unincorporated Leflore County and is designated by the U.S. Census Bureau as Mississippi Valley State, Mississippi.)	1950	2,147	Delta Devilettes	2026		Women's flag football	Southwestern (SWAC)
North Carolina A&T State University (North Carolina A&T)	Greensboro, North Carolina	1891	13,322	Aggies	2021 (Note: North Carolina A&T was a full member of the MEAC from 1970–71 to 2020–21, before joining the Big South Conference at that time.)		Women's bowling	Coastal (CAA)
University of Alabama at Birmingham (UAB)	Birmingham, Alabama	1966	20,902	Blazers	2018		Women's bowling	American

=== Former full members ===
Institution	Location	Founded	Type	Nickname	Joined (Note: Represents the calendar year when fall sports competition begins.)	Left (Note: Represents the calendar year when spring sports competition ends.)	Colors	Subsequent conference	Current conference
Bethune-Cookman University	Daytona Beach, Florida	1904	Private	Wildcats	1979	2021		Southwestern (SWAC) (2021–present)	
Florida A&M University (Note: Florida A&M left the MEAC completely for two seasons from 1984–85 to 1985–86 and competed as an NCAA D-I Independent after a disagreement with the MEAC office over the playing of the rivalry game between Florida A&M and Bethune–Cookman University when FAMU refused to play conference mate BCU at a neutral site in Tampa in 1983 and the game was not played again in 1984. Florida A&M returned all sports to the MEAC effective the 1986–87 school year (with football returning later on, beginning the 1987 fall season [1987–88 school year]). FAMU football left the conference after the 2003 fall season (2003–04 school year) during an attempt to move up to Division I-A (now FBS) with all other sports remaining in the MEAC. Financial difficulties halted the move after the 2004 fall season (2004–05 school year), at which time FAMU football returned back to the MEAC during the 2005 fall season (2005–06 school year).)	Tallahassee, Florida	1887	Public	Rattlers & Lady Rattlers	1979	1984		Southwestern (SWAC) (2021–present)	
Florida A&M University	Tallahassee, Florida	1887	Public	Rattlers & Lady Rattlers	1986	2021		Southwestern (SWAC) (2021–present)	
Hampton University	Hampton, Virginia	1868	Private	Pirates	1995	2018		Big South (BSC) (2018–22)	Coastal (CAA) (2022–present)
North Carolina A&T State University (Note: North Carolina A&T remains as an associate member of the MEAC for women's bowling.) (North Carolina A&T)	Greensboro, North Carolina	1891	Public	Aggies	1970	2021		Big South (BSC) (2021–22)	Coastal (CAA) (2022–present)
Savannah State University	Savannah, Georgia	1890	Public	Tigers & Lady Tigers	2010	2019		Southern (SIAC) (Note: Currently an NCAA Division II athletic conference.) (2019–present)	
Winston-Salem State University (Note: Winston–Salem State University was a transitional member and never attained full membership in the MEAC or NCAA Division I before returning to Division II and the Central Intercollegiate Athletic Association (CIAA) after the 2009–10 school year, due to financial difficulties. They were scheduled to begin full membership and gain access to NCAA tournaments in 2011.)	Winston-Salem, North Carolina	1892	Public	Rams	2007	2010		Central (CIAA) (2010–present)	

=== Former associate members ===
Institution	Location	Founded	Type	Nickname	Joined (Note: Represents the calendar year when fall sports competition begins.)	Left (Note: Represents the calendar year when spring sports competition ends.)	Colors	MEAC sport(s)	Primary conference	Conference in former MEAC sport(s)
Augusta University	Augusta, Georgia	1785	Public	Jaguars	2014	2021		Men's golf	Peach Belt (PBC) (Note: Currently an NCAA Division II athletic conference.)	West Coast (WCC)
Monmouth University	West Long Branch, New Jersey	1933	Private	Hawks	2018	2024		Women's bowling	Coastal (CAA)	Northeast (NEC)

=== Membership timeline ===
- Augusta State was merged into Georgia Regents University in January 2013; the merged school renamed itself Augusta University in 2015.

Full member (all sports) Full member (non-football) Associate member (football) Associate member (sport) Other Conference Other Conference

== Facilities ==
School	Football stadium	Capacity	Basketball arena	Capacity
Coppin State	Non-football school (Note: Coppin State has a club football team that competes in the Mid Atlantic Conference of the National Club Football Association. This team does compete at an on-campus facility.)		Physical Education Complex	4,100
Delaware State	Alumni Stadium	7,193	Memorial Hall	1,800
Howard	William H. Greene Stadium	10,000	Burr Gymnasium	2,700
Maryland–Eastern Shore	Non-football school		Hytche Athletic Center	5,500
Morgan State	Hughes Stadium	10,000	Hill Field House	4,000
Norfolk State	William "Dick" Price Stadium	30,000	Echols Hall	4,500
North Carolina Central	O'Kelly–Riddick Stadium	10,000	McDougald–McLendon Gymnasium	3,000
South Carolina State	Oliver C. Dawson Stadium	20,000	SHM Memorial Center	3,000

== Apparel ==
School	Provider
Coppin State	Nike
Delaware State	Nike
Howard University	Jordan, Curry Brand (golf only)
University of Maryland Eastern Shore	Nike
Morgan State	Under Armour
Norfolk State	Nike
North Carolina Central	Nike
South Carolina State	Nike

== Sports ==
The Mid-Eastern Athletic Conference (MEAC) sponsors championship competition in six men's and 10 women's NCAA-sanctioned sports. Women's flag football is currently recognized as part of the NCAA Emerging Sports for Women program.

Teams in Mid-Eastern Athletic Conference competition
Sport	Men's	Women's
Basketball	8	8
Bowling	–	8
Cross country	8	8
Flag football	–	6
Football	6	–
Golf	–	4
Softball	–	8
Tennis	6	7
Track and field (indoor)	8	8
Track and field (outdoor)	8	8
Volleyball	–	8

=== Men's sponsored sports by school ===
School	Basketball	Cross country	Football	Tennis	Track & field (Indoor)	Track & field (Outdoor)	Total MEAC Sports
Coppin State	Yes	Yes	No	Yes	Yes	Yes	5
Delaware State	Yes	Yes	Yes	No	Yes	Yes	5
Howard	Yes	Yes	Yes	Yes	Yes	Yes	6
UMES	Yes	Yes	No	No	Yes	Yes	4
Morgan State	Yes	Yes	Yes	Yes	Yes	Yes	6
Norfolk State	Yes	Yes	Yes	Yes	Yes	Yes	6
NC Central	Yes	Yes	Yes	Yes	Yes	Yes	6
SC State	Yes	Yes	Yes	Yes	Yes	Yes	6
Totals	8	8	6	6	8	8	44

Men's varsity sports not sponsored by the Mid-Eastern Athletic Conference which are played by MEAC schools:

School	Baseball	Golf	Soccer	Swimming & diving	Volleyball	Wrestling
Coppin State	NEC					
Delaware State	NEC					
Howard		NEC	NEC	NEC		
UMES	NEC	NEC			NEC	
Morgan State		(Note: Morgan State will add men's golf in 2027–28.)				EIWA
Norfolk State	NEC					
NC Central		NEC				

=== Women's sponsored sports by school ===
School	Basketball	Bowling	Cross country	Flag football (Note: Part of the NCAA Emerging Sports for Women program.)	Golf	Softball	Tennis	Track & field (indoor)	Track & field (outdoor)	Volleyball	Total MEAC Sports
Coppin State	Yes	Yes	Yes	No	No	Yes	Yes	Yes	Yes	Yes	8
Delaware State	Yes	Yes	Yes	Yes	Yes	Yes	Yes	Yes	Yes	Yes	10
Howard	Yes	Yes	Yes	No	Yes	Yes	Yes	Yes	Yes	Yes	10
UMES	Yes	Yes	Yes	Yes	Yes	Yes	No	Yes	Yes	Yes	9
Morgan State	Yes	Yes	Yes	No	No (Note: Morgan State will add women's golf in 2027–28.)	Yes	Yes	Yes	Yes	Yes	8
Norfolk State	Yes	Yes	Yes	Yes	No	Yes	Yes	Yes	Yes	Yes	9
NC Central	Yes	No	Yes	Yes	Yes	Yes	Yes	Yes	Yes	Yes	9
SC State	Yes	No	Yes	No	No	Yes	Yes	Yes	Yes	Yes	7
Totals	8	6+2 (Note: Bowling associates North Carolina A&T and UAB.)	8	4+2 (Note: Flag football associates Gardner–Webb and Mississippi Valley State.)	4	8	7	8	8	8	70+4

Women's varsity sports not sponsored by the Mid-Eastern Athletic Conference which are played by MEAC schools:

School	Equestrian (Note: Part of the NCAA Emerging Sports for Women program.)	Lacrosse	Soccer	Swimming & diving
Delaware State	ECAC/ NCEA	NEC	NEC	—
Howard	—	NEC	NEC	NEC
SC State	—	—	IND	—

== Championships ==
=== NCAA National championships ===
School	Nat'l titles	Years
Howard	1	1971 (Note: Howard was later disqualified from their 1971 NCAA soccer championship; however, no team was ever announced as the new champion.)• 1974
Maryland-Eastern Shore	3	2008 • 2011 • 2012

=== Football ===
The MEAC, along with the Southwestern Athletic Conference (SWAC), are the only two Division I conferences whose members are mostly Historically Black Colleges and Universities (HBCUs). In 2015, the MEAC joined the SWAC and Ivy leagues in abstaining from sending their conference champions to the FCS Playoffs. While the conference champion faces off in the Celebration Bowl against the SWAC Champion, the remaining conference members remain eligible for at-large bids for the playoffs.

This is a partial list of the last 10 champions. For the full history, see List of Mid-Eastern Athletic Conference football champions.

		Record		Ranking			
Year	Champions	Conference	Overall	AP/STATS	UPI/Coaches'	Postseason result	Head coach
2010	Bethune-Cookman; South Carolina State; Florida A&M	7–1; 7–1; 7–1	10–2; 9–3; 8–3	No. 15; No. 16; NR	15; 17; NR	NCAA Division I Second Round, L 20–45 vs. New Hampshire; NCAA Division I First Round, L 16–41 vs. Georgia Southern; No Playoff Invite	Brian Jenkins; Oliver Pough; Joe Taylor
2011	Championship vacated by Norfolk State (Note: Norfolk State's 2011 MEAC football championship was vacated as a result of NCAA Violations.)						
2012	Bethune-Cookman	8–0	9–3	No. 22	23	NCAA Division I First Round, L 14–24 vs. Coastal Carolina	Brian Jenkins
2013	Bethune-Cookman; South Carolina State	7–1; 7–1	10–3; 9–4	No. 16; No. 25	No. 16; NR	NCAA Division I First Round, L 24–48 vs. Coastal Carolina; NCAA Division I First Round, L 20–30 vs. Furman	Brian Jenkins; Oliver Pough
2014	Morgan State (Note: As a result of the MEAC football tiebreaker, Morgan State earned the conference's Automatic bid for the NCAA Division I FCS Playoffs.); Bethune-Cookman; North Carolina A&T; South Carolina State; North Carolina Central	6–2; 6–2; 6–2; 6–2; 6–2	7–5; 9–3; 9–3; 8–4; 7–5	No. 23; NR; NR; NR; NR	No. 22; NR; NR; NR; NR	NCAA Division I First Round, L 24–46 vs. Richmond; No Playoff invite No Playoff invite No Playoff invite No Playoff invite	Lee Hull; Brian Jenkins; Rod Broadway; Buddy Pough; Jerry Mack
2015	North Carolina A&T; Bethune-Cookman; North Carolina Central	7–1; 7–1; 7–1	10–2; 9–2; 8–3	No. 21; NR; NR	No. 21; No. 25; NR	Celebration Bowl, W 41–34 vs. Alcorn State; No Playoff invite No Playoff invite	Rod Broadway; Terry Sims; Jerry Mack
2016	North Carolina Central	8–0	9–3	No. 20	No. 22	Celebration Bowl, L 9–10 vs. Grambling State	Jerry Mack
2017	North Carolina A&T	8–0	12–0	No. 8	No. 7	Celebration Bowl, W 21–14 vs. Grambling State	Rod Broadway
2018	North Carolina A&T	7–1	10–2	No. 12	No. 11	Celebration Bowl, W 24–22 vs. Alcorn State	Sam Washington
2019	North Carolina A&T	6–2	9–3	No. 23	No. 22	Celebration Bowl, W 64–44 vs. Alcorn State	Sam Washington
2020-21	Season Suspended due to the COVID-19 pandemic (Note: In July 2020, the MEAC announced that it would cancel its fall sports seasons due to the COVID-19 pandemic and announced the league would explore the possibility of playing in the spring. The conference later released a spring schedule, but had to suspend indefinitely, per league bi-laws, when six of the nine football playing schools had opted out of playing.)						
2021	South Carolina State	5–0	6–5	NR	NR	Celebration Bowl, W 31–10 vs. Jackson State	Oliver Pough
2022	North Carolina Central	4–1	10–2	RV	No. 21	Celebration Bowl, W 41–34 ^{OT} vs. Jackson State	Trei Oliver
2023	Howard	4–1	6–6	NR	NR	Celebration Bowl, L 26–30 vs. Florida A&M	Larry Scott
2024	South Carolina State	5–0	9–3	No.20	No.18	Celebration Bowl, L 28–7 vs. Jackson State	Chennis Berry
2025	South Carolina State	5–0	9–3	NR	NR	Celebration Bowl, W 40–38 (4OTS) vs. Prairie View A&M	Chennis Berry

==== Celebration Bowl results ====
Year	MEAC Team		SWAC Team		Attendance	Series
2015	North Carolina A&T Aggies	41	Alcorn State Braves	34	35,528	MEAC 1–0
2016	North Carolina Central Eagles	9	Grambling State Tigers	10	31,096	Tied 1–1
2017	North Carolina A&T Aggies	21	Grambling State Tigers	14	25,873	MEAC 2–1
2018	North Carolina A&T Aggies	24	Alcorn State Braves	22	31,672	MEAC 3–1
2019	North Carolina A&T Aggies	64	Alcorn State Braves	44	32,968	MEAC 4–1
2021	South Carolina State Bulldogs	31	Jackson State Tigers	10	48,653	MEAC 5–1
2022	North Carolina Central Eagles	41	Jackson State Tigers	34 (OT)	49,670	MEAC 6–1
2023	Howard Bison	26	Florida A&M Rattlers	30	41,108	MEAC 6–2
2024	South Carolina State Bulldogs	7	Jackson State Tigers	28	36,823	MEAC 6–3
2025	South Carolina State Bulldogs	40	Prairie View A&M Panthers	38(4OTS)	26,703	MEAC 7–3

=== Men's basketball ===
On June 8, 1980, the MEAC earned the classification as a Division I conference by the National Collegiate Athletic Association (NCAA). Since 1981, the MEAC has received a qualifying bid to NCAA post season play in the sport of basketball. In three cases, MEAC schools seeded 15th (Coppin State in 1997, Hampton in 2001, Norfolk State in 2012) defeated second-seeded teams South Carolina, Iowa State and Missouri, respectively, in the NCAA tournament.

Coppin State again made history, as it qualified for the tournament as the first 20-loss team to play in the NCAA Tournament.

Season	Regular season champion(s)	Tournament champion
1972	North Carolina A&T	North Carolina A&T
1973	Maryland Eastern Shore	North Carolina A&T
1974	Maryland Eastern Shore	Maryland Eastern Shore
1975	North Carolina A&T	North Carolina A&T
1976	North Carolina A&T	North Carolina A&T
1977	South Carolina State	Morgan State
1978	North Carolina A&T	North Carolina A&T
1979	North Carolina A&T	North Carolina A&T
1980	Howard	Howard
1981	North Carolina A&T	Howard
1982	North Carolina A&T	North Carolina A&T
1983	Howard	North Carolina A&T
1984	North Carolina A&T	North Carolina A&T
1985	North Carolina A&T	North Carolina A&T
1986	North Carolina A&T	North Carolina A&T
1987	Howard	North Carolina A&T
1988	North Carolina A&T	North Carolina A&T
1989	South Carolina State	South Carolina State
1990	Coppin State	Coppin State
1991	Coppin State	Florida A&M

Season	Regular season champion(s)	Tournament champion
1992	Howard	Howard
1993	Coppin State	Coppin State
1994	Coppin State	North Carolina A&T
1995	Coppin State	North Carolina A&T
1996	Coppin State; South Carolina State	South Carolina State
1997	Coppin State	Coppin State
1998	Coppin State	South Carolina State
1999	South Carolina State; Coppin State	Florida A&M
2000	South Carolina State	South Carolina State
2001	Hampton	Hampton
2002	Hampton	Hampton
2003	South Carolina State	South Carolina State
2004	South Carolina State; Coppin State	Florida A&M
2005	Delaware State	Delaware State
2006	Delaware State	Hampton
2007	Delaware State	Florida A&M
2008	Morgan State	Coppin State
2009	Morgan State	Morgan State

Season	Regular season champion(s)	Tournament champion
2010	Morgan State	Morgan State
2011	Bethune–Cookman	Hampton
2012	Savannah State	Norfolk State
2013	Norfolk State	North Carolina A&T
2014	North Carolina Central	North Carolina Central
2015	North Carolina Central	Hampton
2016	Hampton	Hampton
2017	North Carolina Central	North Carolina Central
2018	Hampton	North Carolina Central
2019	Norfolk State	North Carolina Central
2021		Norfolk State
2022	Norfolk State	Norfolk State
2023	Howard	Howard
2024	Norfolk State	Howard
2025	Norfolk State; South Carolina State	Norfolk State
2026	Howard	Howard

==== Tournament performance by active schools ====
School	Championships	Championship years
Howard	5	1980,1981,1992,2023,2024
South Carolina State	5	1989,1996,1998,2000,2003
Coppin State	4	1990,1993,1997,2008
North Carolina Central	4	2014,2017,2018, 2019
Norfolk State	4	2012, 2021, 2022, 2025
Morgan State	3	1977,2009,2010
Maryland Eastern Shore	1	1974
Delaware State	1	2005

=== Women's basketball ===
Season	Regular season champion(s)	Tournament champion
1978	–	South Carolina State
1979	–	South Carolina State
1980	–	–
1981	–	–
1982	–	Howard
1983	–	South Carolina State
1984	South Carolina State	Bethune–Cookman
1985	South Carolina State	Howard
1986	South Carolina State	South Carolina State
1987	Howard	Howard
1988	North Carolina A&T	Howard
1989	North Carolina A&T	Howard
1990	North Carolina A&T	Howard
1991	South Carolina State	Coppin State
1992	South Carolina State	South Carolina State
1993	South Carolina State; Coppin State; Florida A&M	South Carolina State

Season	Regular season champion(s)	Tournament champion
1994	South Carolina State	North Carolina A&T
1995	Florida A&M	Florida A&M
1996	Florida A&M	Howard
1997	Howard	Howard
1998	Howard	Howard
1999	Hampton	Florida A&M
2000	Howard	Hampton
2001	Howard	Howard
2002	Howard	Norfolk State
2003	Hampton	Hampton
2004	Delaware State; Hampton	Hampton
2005	Coppin State	Coppin State
2006	Coppin State	Coppin State
2007	Coppin State	Delaware State
2008	North Carolina A&T	Coppin State
2009	North Carolina A&T	North Carolina A&T

Season	Regular season champion(s)	Tournament champion
2010	North Carolina A&T	Hampton University
2011	Hampton	Hampton
2012	Hampton	Hampton
2013	Hampton	Hampton
2014	Hampton	Hampton
2015	Hampton	Savannah State
2016	Bethune Cookman; North Carolina A&T	North Carolina A&T
2017	Bethune Cookman	Hampton
2018	North Carolina A&T	North Carolina A&T
2019	North Carolina A&T	Bethune Cookman
2021		North Carolina A&T
2022	Howard; Norfolk State; Morgan State	Howard
2023	Norfolk State	Norfolk State
2024	Norfolk State	Norfolk State
2025	Norfolk State	Norfolk State

=== Baseball ===
Last 10 years of champions. In 2023, the four remaining baseball programs from the MEAC joined the Northeast Conference to compete in baseball as associate members.

Season	Regular season champion(s)	Tournament champion
2012	Bethune–Cookman	Bethune–Cookman
2013	Delaware State	Savannah State
2014		Bethune–Cookman
2015		Florida A&M
2016		Bethune–Cookman
2017		Bethune–Cookman
2018		North Carolina A&T
2019		Florida A&M
2021		Norfolk State
2022	Delaware State	Coppin State

== See also ==
- List of black college football classics
