= 2015 Indianapolis Colts season =

63rd season in franchise history

- Owner: Jim Irsay
- General manager: Ryan Grigson
- Head coach: Chuck Pagano
- Home stadium: Lucas Oil Stadium

Results
- Record: 8–8
- Division place: 2nd AFC South
- Playoffs: Did not qualify
- Pro Bowlers: Mike Adams, SS; Vontae Davis, CB; T. Y. Hilton, WR

Uniform
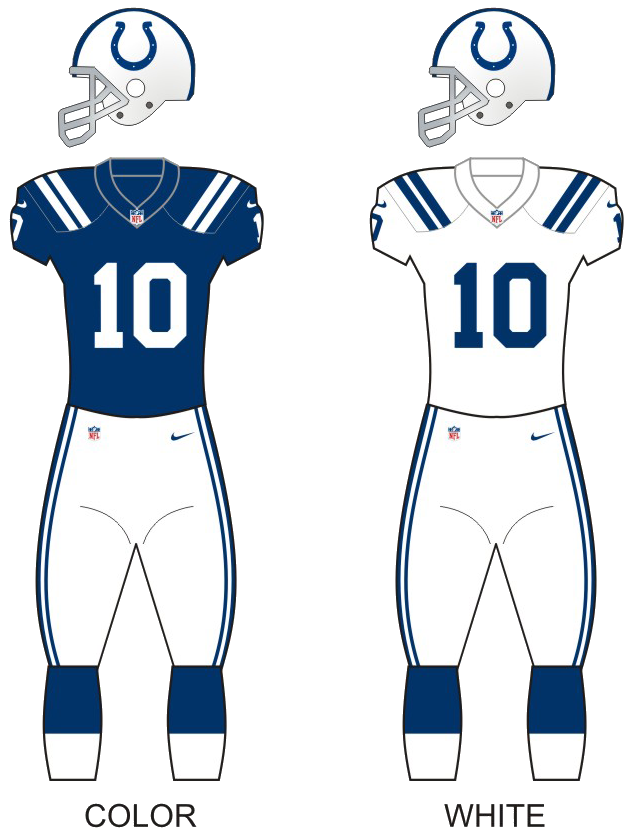

The 2015 season was the Indianapolis Colts' 63rd in the National Football League (NFL) and their 32nd in Indianapolis, surpassing the 31 seasons they played in their original home city of Baltimore. It was also their eighth season playing their home games at Lucas Oil Stadium, and the fourth season under the trio of head coach Chuck Pagano, general manager Ryan Grigson and quarterback Andrew Luck. The Colts entered the 2015 season as the defending AFC South champions and AFC Championship runner-ups, a loss mired with controversy.

After a week 8 loss to the Carolina Panthers, the Colts fired offensive coordinator Pep Hamilton and elevated associate head coach Rob Chudzinski to replace him. The Colts failed to improve from their three consecutive 11–5 records and finished the season at 8–8. They lost the division to the Houston Texans and failed to make the playoffs for the first time since 2011 and only the fourth time since 1998. This was their first time to lose to the Houston Texans at home since the Texans entered the NFL in 2002.

== 2015 draft class ==
2015 Indianapolis Colts Draft
Round	Selection	Player	Position	College
1	29	Phillip Dorsett	Wide receiver	Miami
3	65	D'Joun Smith	Cornerback	Florida Atlantic
3	93	Henry Anderson	Defensive end	Stanford
4	109	Clayton Geathers	Safety	Central Florida
5	151	David Parry	Nose tackle	Stanford
6	205	Josh Robinson	Running back	Mississippi State
6	207	Amarlo Herrera	Inside linebacker	Georgia
7*	255	Denzelle Good	Tackle	Mars Hill

*	Compensatory selection

Draft trades

- Indianapolis traded their second and fourth-round selections (No. 61 and 128, respectively) to the Tampa Bay Buccaneers in exchange for Tampa's third and fourth-round selections (No. 65 and 109, respectively).
- Indianapolis traded their fifth and seventh-round selections (No. 165 and 244, respectively) to the San Francisco 49ers in exchange for San Francisco's fifth-round selection (No. 151).
- Indianapolis acquired an additional sixth-round selection (No. 207 overall) in a trade that sent cornerback Marcus Burley to the Seattle Seahawks.
- Indianapolis traded their original seventh-round selection (No. 246 overall) to the San Francisco 49ers in exchange for linebacker Cam Johnson.
- Indianapolis acquired an additional seventh-round selection (No. 244 overall) in a trade that sent defensive end Caesar Rayford to the Dallas Cowboys.

=== Undrafted free agents ===
Position	Player	College	Notes
QB	Bryan Bennett	Southeastern Louisiana	
RB	Abou Toure	Tennessee-Martin	Waived on August 31
RB	Tyler Varga	Yale	
TE	Jean Sifrin	Massachusetts-Amherst	Waived on June 2
TE	Justin Sinz	Purdue	Waived on August 31
C	Brandon Vitabile	Northwestern	Waived on August 31
WR	Ezell Ruffin	San Diego State	Waived on August 31
WR	Quan Bray	Auburn	
WR	Tyler Rutenbeck	Dubuque	
CB	Al-Hajj Shabazz	West Chester	
CB	Josh Mitchell	Nebraska	
CB	Donald Celiscar	Western Michigan	Waived-injured on August 31
CB	Raymon Taylor	Michigan	
ILB	Justin Shirk	Bloomsburg	Waived on August 31
ILB	Junior Sylvestre	Toledo	
OLB	Cody Galea	San Diego State	
OLB	Terrell Hartsfield	Cincinnati	Waived on May 10
OLB	Zack Hodges	Harvard	Waived on August 31
S	Robert Smith	Clemson	
K	Taylor Ponitus	North Alabama	

== Roster moves ==
=== Free agents ===
Position	Player	Free agency tag	Date signed/released	2015 team	Notes
S	Mike Adams	UFA	March 10, 2015	Indianapolis Colts	
LB	Daniel Adongo	ERFA	March 10, 2015	Indianapolis Colts	
S	Colt Anderson	UFA	March 10, 2015	Indianapolis Colts	
RB	Ahmad Bradshaw	UFA	October 14, 2015	Indianapolis Colts	
S	Sergio Brown	UFA	March 11, 2015	Jacksonville Jaguars	
CB	Darius Butler	UFA	March 8, 2015	Indianapolis Colts	
LB	Jerrell Freeman	RFA	April 27, 2015	Indianapolis Colts	
CB	Josh Gordy	UFA	April 15, 2015	New York Giants	
QB	Matt Hasselbeck	UFA	February 26, 2015	Indianapolis Colts	
RB	Daniel Herron	ERFA	April 1, 2015	Indianapolis Colts	
S	Delano Howell	RFA	–	–	–
LB	Cam Johnson	ERFA	March 10, 2015	Indianapolis Colts	
LB	Josh McNary	ERFA	September 15, 2015	Indianapolis Colts	
LS	Matt Overton	RFA	March 3, 2015	Indianapolis Colts	
DE	Fili Moala	UFA	August 19, 2015	Houston Texans	
G	Joe Reitz	UFA	March 10, 2015	Indianapolis Colts	
WR	Hakeem Nicks	UFA	April 24, 2015	Tennessee Titans	
DT	Jeris Pendleton	ERFA	June 30, 2015	Indianapolis Colts	
DE	Cory Redding	UFA	March 11, 2015	Arizona Cardinals	
C	A. Q. Shipley	RFA	March 11, 2015	Arizona Cardinals	
LB	Andy Studebaker	UFA	March 10, 2015	Tennessee Titans	
WR	Reggie Wayne	UFA	March 10, 2015	New England Patriots	

RFA: Restricted free agent, UFA: Unrestricted free agent, ERFA: Exclusive rights free agent, FT: Franchise tag

=== Additions ===
Position	Player	Tag	2014 Team	Notes
WR	Duron Carter	UFA	Montreal Alouettes	Signed on February 3, 2015.
OL	Ben Heenan	UFA	Saskatchewan Roughriders	Signed on February 3, 2015.
DE	Earl Okine	UFA	Brooklyn Bolts	Signed on March 3, 2015.
G	Todd Herremans	UFA	Philadelphia Eagles	Signed on March 8, 2015.
RB	Frank Gore	UFA	San Francisco 49ers	Signed on March 10, 2015.
LB	Trent Cole	UFA	Philadelphia Eagles	Signed on March 10, 2015.
DE	Kendall Langford	UFA	St. Louis Rams	Signed on March 10, 2015.
WR	Andre Johnson	UFA	Houston Texans	Signed on March 11, 2015.
LB	Nate Irving	UFA	Denver Broncos	Signed on March 20, 2015.
WR	Vincent Brown	UFA	Oakland Raiders	Signed on March 31, 2015.
S	Dwight Lowery	UFA	Atlanta Falcons	Signed on April 3, 2015.

=== Departures ===
Position	Player	Tag	2015 Team	Notes
S	LaRon Landry	UFA	--	Released on February 11, 2015.
LB	Andrew Jackson	UFA	--	Released on February 11, 2015.
T	Xavier Nixon	UFA	Washington Redskins	Released on February 11, 2015.
LB	Shaun Phillips	UFA	--	Released on February 16, 2015.
DE	Ricky Jean-Francois	UFA	Washington Redskins	Released on February 23, 2015.
RB	Michael Hill	UFA	Washington Redskins	Released on March 12, 2015.
RB	Trent Richardson	UFA	Oakland Raiders	Released on March 12, 2015.

== Staff ==
2015 Indianapolis Colts staff
Front office: Owner/CEO – Jim Irsay; General manager – Ryan Grigson; Vice president of football operations – Jimmy Raye III; Director of college scouting – T. J. McCreight; Director of football administration – Mike Bluem; Associate director of pro personnel – Kevin Rogers Jr.; Assistant director of college scouting – Todd Vasvari; Head coaches: Head coach – Chuck Pagano; Associate head coach/offensive coordinator – Rob Chudzinski; Offensive coaches: Quarterbacks – Clyde Christensen; Running backs – Charlie Williams; Wide receivers – Jim Hostler; Tight ends – Alfredo Roberts; Offensive line – Joe Gilbert; Offensive line – Hal Hunter; Offensive quality control – Frank Giufre	Defensive coaches: Defensive coordinator – Greg Manusky; Defensive line – Gary Emanuel; Linebackers – Jeff FitzGerald; Outside linebackers – Brad White; Secondary – Mike Gillhamer; Safeties – Roy Anderson; Defensive assistant – Tim Berbenich; Special teams coaches: Special teams coordinator – Tom McMahon; Assistant special teams – Brant Boyer; Strength and conditioning: Strength and conditioning – Roger Marandino; Assistant strength and conditioning – Richard Howell

== Final roster ==
2015 Indianapolis Colts roster
Quarterbacks (QB): 5 Josh Freeman; 8 Matt Hasselbeck; 3 Ryan Lindley; 12 Andrew Luck; 7 Stephen Morris; Running backs (RB): 23 Frank Gore; 36 Dan Herron; 40 Trey Williams; Wide receivers (WR): 11 Quan Bray RS; 15 Phillip Dorsett; 13 T. Y. Hilton; 81 Andre Johnson; 10 Donte Moncrief; Tight ends (TE): 84 Jack Doyle; 80 Coby Fleener; 86 Erik Swoope	Offensive linemen (OL): 74 Anthony Castonzo T; 71 Denzelle Good T; 72 Jonotthan Harrison C; 62 Khaled Holmes C; 60 Lance Louis G; 75 Jack Mewhort T; 76 Joe Reitz T; Defensive linemen (DL): 58 Trent Cole DE; 94 Zach Kerr DT; 90 Kendall Langford DE; 98 Robert Mathis DE; 67 T. Y. McGill DT; 95 Earl Okine DE; 64 Kelcy Quarles DE; 54 David Parry DT; 92 Björn Werner DE	Linebackers (LB): 50 Jerrell Freeman MLB; 49 Amarlo Herrera MLB; 52 D'Qwell Jackson OLB; 51 Sio Moore OLB; 91 Jonathan Newsome OLB; 59 Andy Studebaker OLB; 93 Erik Walden OLB; Defensive backs (DB): 29 Mike Adams SS; 32 Colt Anderson SS; 31 Jalil Brown CB; 20 Darius Butler CB; 35 Akeem Davis FS; 21 Vontae Davis CB; 42 Clayton Geathers S; 39 Tay Glover-Wright CB; 27 Winston Guy FS; 33 Dwight Lowery FS; 28 Greg Toler CB; Special teams (ST): 1 Pat McAfee P; 45 Matt Overton LS; 4 Adam Vinatieri K	Practice squad: 73 Pierce Burton T; 16 Duron Carter WR; 63 Ben Heenan G; 53 Edwin Jackson MLB; 65 Kitt O'Brien G; 26 LaDarius Perkins RB; 34 Josh Robinson RB (IR); 25 Dezmen Southward FS; 14 Joshua Stangby WR; 61 Joe Vellano DT; 47 Brian Vogler TE; Reserve: 83 Dwayne Allen TE (IR); 96 Henry Anderson DT (IR); 44 Ahmad Bradshaw RB (IR); 55 Nate Irving MLB (IR); 97 Arthur Jones DT (IR); 57 Josh McNary MLB (IR); 43 Tevin Mitchel CB (IR); 46 Josh Mitchell CB (IR); 30 D'Joun Smith CB (IR); 48 Junior Sylvestre OLB (IR); 69 Hugh Thornton G (IR); 38 Tyler Varga FB (IR); 6 Charlie Whitehurst QB (IR); 99 Billy Winn DT (IR); Rookies in italics 53 active, 15 reserve, 10 practice squad

== Schedule ==
=== Preseason ===
Week	Date	Opponent	Result	Record	Venue	Recap
1	August 16	at Philadelphia Eagles	**L** 10–36	0–1	Lincoln Financial Field	Recap
2	August 22	Chicago Bears	**L** 11–23	0–2	Lucas Oil Stadium	Recap
3	August 29	at St. Louis Rams	**W** 24–14	1–2	Edward Jones Dome	Recap
4	September 3	Cincinnati Bengals	**L** 6–9	1–3	Lucas Oil Stadium	Recap

=== Regular season ===
Week	Date	Opponent	Result	Record	Venue	Recap
1	September 13	at Buffalo Bills	**L** 14–27	0–1	Ralph Wilson Stadium	Recap
2	September 21	New York Jets	**L** 7–20	0–2	Lucas Oil Stadium	Recap
3	September 27	at **Tennessee Titans**	**W** 35–33	1–2	Nissan Stadium	Recap
4	October 4	**Jacksonville Jaguars**	**W** 16–13 (OT)	2–2	Lucas Oil Stadium	Recap
5	October 8	at **Houston Texans**	**W** 27–20	3–2	NRG Stadium	Recap
6	October 18	New England Patriots	**L** 27–34	3–3	Lucas Oil Stadium	Recap
7	October 25	New Orleans Saints	**L** 21–27	3–4	Lucas Oil Stadium	Recap
8	November 2	at Carolina Panthers	**L** 26–29 (OT)	3–5	Bank of America Stadium	Recap
9	November 8	Denver Broncos	**W** 27–24	4–5	Lucas Oil Stadium	Recap
10	Bye					
11	November 22	at Atlanta Falcons	**W** 24–21	5–5	Georgia Dome	Recap
12	November 29	Tampa Bay Buccaneers	**W** 25–12	6–5	Lucas Oil Stadium	Recap
13	December 6	at Pittsburgh Steelers	**L** 10–45	6–6	Heinz Field	Recap
14	December 13	at **Jacksonville Jaguars**	**L** 16–51	6–7	EverBank Field	Recap
15	December 20	**Houston Texans**	**L** 10–16	6–8	Lucas Oil Stadium	Recap
16	December 27	at Miami Dolphins	**W** 18–12	7–8	Sun Life Stadium	Recap
17	January 3	**Tennessee Titans**	**W** 30–24	8–8	Lucas Oil Stadium	Recap

Note: Intra-division opponents are in bold text.

=== Game summaries ===
==== Week 1: at Buffalo Bills ====
Week One: Indianapolis Colts at Buffalo Bills – Game summary

Quarter	1	2	3	4	Total
Colts	0	0	8	6	**14**
**Bills**	7	10	7	3	**27**

at Ralph Wilson Stadium, Orchard Park, New York

- Date: September 13
- Game time: 1:00 p.m. EDT
- Game weather: 56 °F (13 °C), cloudy
- Game attendance: 70,319
- Referee: John Parry
- TV announcers (CBS): Spero Dedes (play-by-play) and Solomon Wilcots (color commentator)
- Recap, Gamebook

Game information

**First quarter**

- BUF – 0:00 Percy Harvin 51-yard TD pass from Tyrod Taylor, Dan Carpenter kick. **Drive** 5 plays, 68 yards, 2:39. (BUF 7–0)

**Second quarter**

- BUF – 7:49 Dan Carpenter 41-yard FG. **Drive** 7 plays, 43 yards, 3:22. (BUF 10–0)
- BUF – 0:20 Karlos Williams 26-yard TD run, Dan Carpenter kick. **Drive** 5 plays, 58 yards, 2:22. (BUF 17–0)

**Third quarter**

- BUF – 9:34 Anthony Dixon 1-yard TD run, Dan Carpenter kick. **Drive** 11 plays, 80 yards, 5:26. (BUF 24–0)
- IND – 0:54 Donte Moncrief 2-yard TD pass from Andrew Luck, 2-point conversion successful (Andrew Luck pass to Coby Fleener). **Drive** 18 plays, 65 yards, 8:40. (BUF 24–8)

**Fourth quarter**

- BUF – 8:14 Dan Carpenter 45-yard FG. **Drive** 4 plays, -1 yard, 1:30. (BUF 27–8)
- IND – 5:56 Dwayne Allen 6-yard TD pass from Andrew Luck, 2-point conversion failed. **Drive** 9 plays, 80 yards, 2:18. (BUF 27–14)

**Top passers**

- IND – Andrew Luck: 26/49, 243 yards, 2 TD, 2 INT
- BUF – Tyrod Taylor: 14/19, 195 yards, 1 TD

**Top rushers**

- IND – Frank Gore: 8 carries, 31 yards
- BUF – Karlos Williams: 6 carries, 55 yards, 1 TD

**Top receivers**

- IND – T. Y. Hilton: 7 receptions, 88 yards
- BUF – Percy Harvin: 5 receptions, 79 yards, 1 TD

**Top tacklers**

- IND – Henry Anderson: 8 tackles, 1 assist
- BUF – Nigel Bradham: 7 tackles, 1 assist, 1 sack

With the loss, the Colts fell to 0–1.

==== Week 2: vs. New York Jets ====
Week Two: New York Jets at Indianapolis Colts – Game summary

Quarter	1	2	3	4	Total
**Jets**	7	3	0	10	**20**
Colts	0	0	0	7	**7**

at Lucas Oil Stadium, Indianapolis, Indiana

- Date: September 21
- Game time: 8:30 p.m. EDT
- Game weather: Played indoors (retractable roof closed)
- Game attendance: 65,220
- Referee: John Hussey
- TV announcers (ESPN): Mike Tirico (play-by-play), Jon Gruden (color commentator) and Lisa Salters (sideline reporter)
- Recap, Gamebook

Game information

**First quarter**

- NYJ – 6:44 Eric Decker 6-yard TD pass from Ryan Fitzpatrick, Nick Folk kick. **Drive** 4 plays, 9 yards, 1:44. (NYJ 7–0)

**Second quarter**

- NYJ – 1:51 Nick Folk 35-yard FG. **Drive** 10 plays, 54 yards, 5:12. (NYJ 10–0)

**Third quarter**

- No scoring plays

**Fourth quarter**

- IND – 10:07 Donte Moncrief 26-yard TD pass from Andrew Luck, Adam Vinatieri kick. **Drive** 8 plays, 91 yards, 3:59. (NYJ 10–7)
- NYJ – 6:20 Brandon Marshall 15-yard TD pass from Ryan Fitzpatrick, Nick Folk kick. **Drive** 7 plays, 80 yards, 3:47. (NYJ 17–7)
- NYJ – 0:57 Nick Folk 46-yard FG. **Drive** 8 plays, 34 yards, 3:38. (NYJ 20–7)

**Top passers**

- NYJ – Ryan Fitzpatrick: 22/34, 244 yards, 2 TD, 1 INT
- IND – Andrew Luck: 21/37, 250 yards, 1 TD, 3 INT

**Top rushers**

- NYJ – Chris Ivory: 14 carries, 57 yards
- IND – Frank Gore: 15 carries, 57 yards

**Top receivers**

- NYJ – Eric Decker: 8 receptions, 97 yards, 1 TD
- IND – Donte Moncrief: 7 receptions, 122 yards, 1 TD

**Top tacklers**

- NYJ – Buster Skrine: 7 tackles, 1 assist
- IND – Jerrell Freeman: 3 tackles, 7 assists

With the upset loss, the Colts fell to 0–2 for the second straight year.

==== Week 3: at Tennessee Titans ====
Week Three: Indianapolis Colts at Tennessee Titans – Game summary

Quarter	1	2	3	4	Total
**Colts**	7	7	0	21	**35**
Titans	0	10	17	6	**33**

at Nissan Stadium, Nashville, Tennessee

- Date: September 27
- Game time: 1:00 p.m. EDT/12:00 p.m. CDT
- Game weather: 74 °F (23 °C), cloudy
- Game attendance: 65,920
- Referee: Craig Wrolstad
- TV announcers (CBS): Tom McCarthy (play-by-play) and Adam Archuleta (color commentator)
- Recap, Gamebook

Game information

**First quarter**

- IND – 5:42 Frank Gore 1-yard TD run, Adam Vinatieri kick. **Drive** 8 plays, 63 yards, 3:43. (IND 7–0)

**Second quarter**

- IND – 12:59 Dwight Lowery 69-yard interception return for a TD, Adam Vinatieri kick. (IND 14–0)
- TEN – 8:29 Ryan Succop 38-yard FG. **Drive** 9 plays, 60 yards, 4:30. (IND 14–3)
- TEN – 0:19 Kendall Wright 7-yard pass from Marcus Mariota, Ryan Succop kick. **Drive** 13 plays, 83 yards, 6:05. (IND 14–10)

**Third quarter**

- TEN – 9:51 Antonio Andrews 8-yard TD run, Ryan Succop kick. **Drive** 6 plays, 66 yards, 3:42. (TEN 17–14)
- TEN – 9:36 Dorial Green-Beckham 3-yard pass from Marcus Mariota, Ryan Succop kick. **Drive** 1 play, 3 yards, 0:05. (TEN 24–14)
- TEN – 3:04 Ryan Succop 21-yard FG. **Drive** 8 plays, 10 yards, 3:41. (TEN 27–14)

**Fourth quarter**

- IND – 6:49 Phillip Dorsett 35-yard TD pass from Andrew Luck, Adam Vinatieri kick. **Drive** 12 plays, 98 yards, 5:31. (TEN 27–21)
- IND – 5:53 Donte Moncrief 11-yard TD pass from Andrew Luck, Adam Vinatieri kick. **Drive** 1 play, 11 yards, 0:06. (IND 28–27)
- IND – 2:51 Frank Gore 6-yard TD run, Adam Vinatieri kick. **Drive** 5 plays, 69 yards, 2:38. (IND 35–27)
- TEN – 0:47 Jalston Fowler 1-yard TD run, 2-point conversion failed. **Drive** 9 plays, 80 yards, 2:04. (IND 35–33)

**Top passers**

- IND – Andrew Luck: 18/30, 260 yards, 2 TD, 2 INT
- TEN – Marcus Mariota: 27/44, 367 yards, 2 TD, 2 INT

**Top rushers**

- IND – Frank Gore: 14 carries, 86 yards, 2 TD
- TEN – Antonio Andrews: 12 carries, 49 yards, 1 TD

**Top receivers**

- IND – T. Y. Hilton: 4 receptions, 94 yards
- TEN – Kendall Wright: 7 receptions 95 yards, 1 TD

**Top tacklers**

- IND – D'Qwell Jackson: 8 tackles, 4 assists
- TEN – Avery Williamson: 4 tackles, 4 assists

After trailing 14–0 in the first half, the Titans would score 27 unanswered points to take a 27–14 lead. However, the Colts would own the fourth quarter, as they outscored Tennessee 21–6. The Titans had a chance to tie the game after pulling within 35–33, but the 2-point attempt failed, and the Colts held on for the win. With the win, the Colts improved to 1–2 and picked up their 8th straight win over the Titans.

==== Week 4: vs. Jacksonville Jaguars ====
Week Four: Jacksonville Jaguars at Indianapolis Colts – Game summary

Quarter	1	2	3	4	OT	Total
Jaguars	3	10	0	0	0	**13**
**Colts**	3	7	0	3	3	**16**

at Lucas Oil Stadium, Indianapolis, Indiana

- Date: October 4
- Game time: 1:00 p.m. EDT
- Game weather: 62 °F (17 °C), partly cloudy — retractable roof open
- Game attendance: 65,609
- Referee: Ed Hochuli
- TV announcers (CBS): Tom McCarthy (play-by-play) and Adam Archuleta (color commentator)
- Recap, Gamebook

Game information

**First quarter**

- IND – 4:59 Adam Vinatieri 54-yard FG. **Drive** 12 plays, 55 yards, 5:26. (IND 3–0)
- JAX – 2:49 Jason Myers 20-yard FG. **Drive** 6 plays, 78 yards, 2:10. (3–3)

**Second quarter**

- JAX – 11:37 Allen Hurns 8-yard TD pass from Blake Bortles, Jason Myers kick. **Drive** 4 plays, 44 yards, 2:00. (JAX 10–3)
- IND – 6:04 Coby Fleener 2-yard TD pass from Matt Hasselbeck, Adam Vinatieri kick. **Drive** 13 plays, 80 yards, 5:33. (10–10)
- JAX – 0:04 Jason Myers 32-yard FG. **Drive** 14 plays, 65 yards, 6:00. (JAX 13–10)

**Third quarter**

- No scoring plays

**Fourth quarter**

- IND – 12:27 Adam Vinatieri 32-yard FG. **Drive** 8 plays, 35 yards, 4:06. (13–13)

**Overtime**

- IND – 4:36 Adam Vinatieri 27-yard FG. **Drive** 6 plays, 53 yards, 3:37. (IND 16–13)

**Top passers**

- JAX – Blake Bortles: 28/50, 298 yards, 1 TD
- IND – Matt Hasselbeck: 30/47, 282 yards, 1 TD

**Top rushers**

- JAX – T. J. Yeldon: 22 carries, 105 yards
- IND – Frank Gore: 17 carries, 53 yards

**Top receivers**

- JAX – Allen Hurns: 11 receptions, 116 yards, 1 TD
- IND – Coby Fleener: 9 receptions, 83 yards, 1 TD

**Top tacklers**

- JAX – John Cyprien: 11 tackles, 3 assists
- IND – D'Qwell Jackson: 10 tackles, 7 assists

Due to an injured shoulder, Andrew Luck missed the first game of his career, and was replaced by 40-year-old veteran Matt Hasselbeck, who avoided any turnovers and led the Colts to a 16–13 win in overtime. Jacksonville kicker Jason Myers would miss 3 game-winning field goal attempts at the end of the fourth quarter and one in overtime. Adam Vinatieri would nail the game winner in overtime to give Indianapolis the win. With the win, the Colts evened their record at 2–2.

==== Week 5: at Houston Texans ====
Week Five: Indianapolis Colts at Houston Texans – Game summary

Quarter	1	2	3	4	Total
**Colts**	10	3	7	7	**27**
Texans	0	10	7	3	**20**

at NRG Stadium, Houston, Texas

- Date: October 8
- Game time: 8:25 p.m. EDT/7:25 p.m. CDT
- Game weather: 83 °F (28 °C), mostly cloudy — retractable roof open
- Referee: Terry McAulay
- TV announcers (CBS/NFLN): Jim Nantz (play-by-play), Phil Simms (color commentator) and Tracy Wolfson (sideline reporter)
- Recap, Gamebook

Game information

**First quarter**

- IND – 6:28 Adam Vinatieri 48-yard FG. **Drive** 5 plays, 26 yards, 2:05. (IND 3–0)
- IND – 1:22 Andre Johnson 4-yard TD pass from Matt Hasselbeck, Adam Vinatieri kick. **Drive** 6 plays, 60 yards, 2:00. (IND 10–0)

**Second quarter**

- IND – 7:37 Adam Vinatieri 42-yard FG. **Drive** 13 plays, 46 yards, 6:01. (IND 13–0)
- HOU – 2:08 Nick Novak 36-yard FG. **Drive** 12 plays, 62 yards, 5:29. (IND 13–3)
- HOU – 0:00 Jaelen Strong 42-yard TD pass from Brian Hoyer, Nick Novak kick. **Drive** 9 plays, 95 yards, 1:16. (IND 13–10)

**Third quarter**

- IND – 13:02 Frank Gore 3-yard TD run, Adam Vinatieri kick. **Drive** 4 plays, 56 yards, 1:58. (IND 20–10)
- HOU – 4:03 Jaelen Strong 11-yard TD pass from Brian Hoyer, Nick Novak kick. **Drive** 10 plays, 90 yards, 5:05. (IND 20–17)

**Fourth quarter**

- IND – 10:28 Andre Johnson 2-yard TD pass from Matt Hasselbeck, Adam Vinatieri kick. **Drive** 14 plays, 80 yards, 8:35. (IND 27–17)
- HOU – 6:07 Nick Novak 49-yard FG. **Drive** 8 plays, 49 yards, 4:21. (IND 27–20)

**Top passers**

- IND – Matt Hasselbeck: 18/29, 213 yards, 2 TD
- HOU – Brian Hoyer: 24/31, 312 yards, 2 TD, 1 INT

**Top rushers**

- IND – Frank Gore: 22 carries, 98 yards, 1 TD
- HOU – Arian Foster: 19 carries, 41 yards

**Top receivers**

- IND – Andre Johnson: 6 receptions, 77 yards, 2 TD
- HOU – DeAndre Hopkins: 11 receptions, 169 yards

**Top tacklers**

- IND – D'Qwell Jackson: 8 tackles, 3 assists
- HOU – Brian Cushing: 8 assists

Despite a Hail Mary being thrown at the end of the first half, the Colts still managed to hold on for the win. With their 3rd straight win, the Colts improved to 3–2, and set a new NFL record for most consecutive wins against division opponents with 16.

==== Week 6: vs. New England Patriots ====
Week Six: New England Patriots at Indianapolis Colts – Game summary

Quarter	1	2	3	4	Total
**Patriots**	7	13	7	7	**34**
Colts	7	14	0	6	**27**

at Lucas Oil Stadium, Indianapolis, Indiana

- Date: October 18
- Game time: 8:30 p.m. EDT
- Game weather: Played indoors (retractable roof closed)
- Game attendance: 66,726
- Referee: Tony Corrente
- TV announcers (NBC): Al Michaels (play-by-play), Cris Collinsworth (color commentator) and Michele Tafoya (sideline reporter)
- Recap, Gamebook

Game information

**First quarter**

- IND – 7:16 Donte Moncrief 5-yard TD pass from Andrew Luck, Adam Vinatieri kick. **Drive** 13 plays, 89 yards, 7:44. (IND 7–0)
- NE – 2:50 Julian Edelman 12-yard TD pass from Tom Brady, Stephen Gostkowski kick. **Drive** 10 plays, 80 yards, 4:26. (7–7)

**Second quarter**

- NE – 13:48 Stephen Gostkowski 40-yard FG. **Drive** 10 plays, 69 yards, 2:53. (NE 10–7)
- IND – 11:30 Mike Adams 14-yard interception return for a TD, Adam Vinatieri kick. (IND 14–10)
- NE – 9:33 LeGarrette Blount 38-yard TD run, Stephen Gostkowski kick. **Drive** 4 plays, 65 yards, 1:57. (NE 17–14)
- IND – 2:38 T. Y. Hilton 3-yard TD pass from Andrew Luck, Adam Vinatieri kick. **Drive** 12 plays, 80 yards, 6:55. (IND 21–17)
- NE – 0:02 Stephen Gostkowski 35-yard FG. **Drive** 9 plays, 63 yards, 2:36. (IND 21–20)

**Third quarter**

- NE – 10:56 Rob Gronkowski 25-yard TD pass from Tom Brady, Stephen Gostkowski kick. **Drive** 7 plays, 80 yards, 4:04. (NE 27–21)

**Fourth quarter**

- NE – 12:48 LeGarrette Blount 11-yard TD pass from Tom Brady, Stephen Gostkowski kick. **Drive** 6 plays, 35 yards, 3:24. (NE 34–21)
- IND – 1:19 Griff Whalen 18-yard TD pass from Andrew Luck, PAT blocked. **Drive** 8 plays, 85 yards, 1:44. (NE 34–27)

**Top passers**

- NE – Tom Brady: 23/37, 312 yards, 3 TDs, 1 INT
- IND – Andrew Luck: 30/50, 312 yards, 3 TDs

**Top rushers**

- NE – LeGarrette Blount: 16 carries, 93 yards, 1 TD
- IND – Frank Gore: 13 carries, 78 yards

**Top receivers**

- NE – Danny Amendola: 7 receptions, 105 yards
- IND – T. Y. Hilton: 6 receptions, 74 yards, 1 TD

**Top tacklers**

- NE – Devin McCourty: 7 tackles, 2 assists
- IND – D'Qwell Jackson: 4 tackles, 9 assists

This game was notorious for a terrible playcall by the Colts, now known as the Colts Catastrophe. With the Colts trailing 27–21 late in the 3rd quarter, Pagano opted to run a scrimmage play using special teams on 4th and 3 on the Colts' 37-yard line. However, a bizarre formation resulted in a Patriots tackle for loss, Colts turnover, and a flag for illegal formation. The Patriots easily scored a touchdown on the next drive and went on to win the game by 7 points, 34–27. The playcall was universally criticized and was considered by many to be the worst play in NFL history.

==== Week 7: vs. New Orleans Saints ====
Week Seven: New Orleans Saints at Indianapolis Colts – Game summary

Quarter	1	2	3	4	Total
**Saints**	7	13	7	0	**27**
Colts	0	0	14	7	**21**

at Lucas Oil Stadium, Indianapolis, Indiana

- Date: October 25
- Game time: 1:00 p.m. EDT
- Game weather: 55 °F (13 °C), mostly cloudy — retractable roof open
- Game attendance: 66,420
- Referee: Carl Cheffers
- TV announcers (Fox): Sam Rosen (play-by-play), John Lynch (color commentator) and Pam Oliver (sideline reporter)
- Recap, Gamebook

Game information

**First quarter**

- NO – 2:31 Khiry Robinson 1-yard TD run, Kai Forbath kick. **Drive** 10 plays, 78 yards, 3:31. (NO 7–0)

**Second quarter**

- NO – 14:56 Khiry Robinson 6-yard TD run, Kai Forbath kick. **Drive** 5 plays, 23 yards, 2:20. (NO 14–0)
- NO – 13:26 Michael Hoomanawanui 16-yard TD pass from Drew Brees, Kai Forbath kick failed, wide left. **Drive** 3 plays, 27 yards, 1:11. (NO 20–0)

**Third quarter**

- NO – 10:26 Mark Ingram II 1-yard TD run, Kai Forbath kick. **Drive** 6 plays, 82 yards, 2:57. (NO 27–0)
- IND – 3:42 T. Y. Hilton 87-yard TD pass from Andrew Luck, Adam Vinatieri kick. **Drive** 2 plays, 87 yards, 0:20. (NO 27–7)
- IND – 0:01 T. Y. Hilton 46-yard TD pass from Andrew Luck, Adam Vinatieri kick. **Drive** 3 plays, 66 yards, 1:24. (NO 27–14)

**Fourth quarter**

- IND – 3:05 Donte Moncrief 8-yard TD pass from Andrew Luck, Adam Vinatieri kick. **Drive** 7 plays, 80 yards, 0:54. (NO 27–21)

**Top passers**

- NO – Drew Brees: 28/44, 255 yards, 1 TD, 1 INT
- IND – Andrew Luck: 23/44, 333 yards, 3 TD, 2 INT

**Top rushers**

- NO – Mark Ingram II: 14 carries, 143 yards, 1 TD
- IND – Frank Gore: 9 carries, 43 yards

**Top receivers**

- NO – Brandin Cooks: 6 receptions, 81 yards
- IND – Frank Gore: 5 receptions, 32 yards

**Top tacklers**

- NO – Dannell Ellerbe: 7 tackles
- IND – Jerrell Freeman: 5 tackles, 7 assists

In the Super Bowl rematch between the two teams, the Saints started the first half, dominating the Colts 20–0, which stunned Indy's home crowd. The Colts looked for answers in the second half, but Andrew Luck struggled to find open receivers and he was intercepted twice.

==== Week 8: at Carolina Panthers ====
Week Eight: Indianapolis Colts at Carolina Panthers – Game summary

Quarter	1	2	3	4	OT	Total
Colts	0	6	0	17	3	**26**
**Panthers**	10	0	7	6	6	**29**

at Bank of America Stadium, Charlotte, North Carolina

- Date: November 2
- Game time: 8:30 p.m. EST
- Game weather: 60 °F (16 °C), light rain
- Game attendance: 74,136
- Referee: Bill Vinovich
- TV announcers (ESPN): Mike Tirico (play-by-play), Jon Gruden (color commentator) and Lisa Salters (sideline reporter)
- Recap, Gamebook

Game information

**First quarter**

- CAR – 13:41 Graham Gano 39-yard FG. **Drive** 4 plays, 3 yards, 0:44. (CAR 3–0)
- CAR – 7:21 Jonathan Stewart 3-yard TD run, Graham Gano kick. **Drive** 11 plays, 37 yards, 5:03. (CAR 10–0)

**Second quarter**

- IND – 10:24 Adam Vinatieri 47-yard FG. **Drive** 7 plays, 27 yards, 4:16. (CAR 10–3)
- IND – 7:04 Adam Vinatieri 34-yard FG. **Drive** 4 plays, 6 yards, 1:04. (CAR 10–6)

**Third quarter**

- CAR – 0:14 Greg Olsen 27-yard TD pass from Cam Newton, Graham Gano kick. **Drive** 2 plays, 29 yards, 0:48. (CAR 17–6)

**Fourth quarter**

- CAR – 10:44 Corey Brown 8-yard TD pass from Cam Newton, Graham Gano kick failed, wide left. **Drive** 3 plays, 30 yards, 1:24. (CAR 23–6)
- IND – 7:04 Andre Johnson 18-yard TD pass from Andrew Luck, Adam Vinatieri kick. **Drive** 8 plays, 86 yards, 3:40. (CAR 23–13)
- IND – 2:27 Coby Fleener 8-yard TD pass from Andrew Luck, Adam Vinatieri kick. **Drive** 8 plays, 57 yards, 2:15. (CAR 23–20)
- IND – 0:00 Adam Vinatieri 24-yard FG. **Drive** 16 plays, 54 yards, 2:02. (23–23)

**Overtime**

- IND – 12:04 Adam Vinatieri 50-yard FG. **Drive** 6 plays, 23 yards, 2:56. (IND 26–23)
- CAR – 7:50 Graham Gano 42-yard FG. **Drive** 9 plays, 57 yards, 4:14. (26–26)
- CAR – 5:22 Graham Gano 52-yard FG. **Drive** 4 plays, 5 yards 1:40. (CAR 29–26)

**Top passers**

- IND – Andrew Luck: 23/47, 231 yards, 2 TDs, 3 INTs
- CAR – Cam Newton: 16/35, 248 yards, 2 TDs, 1 INT

**Top rushers**

- IND – Frank Gore: 22 carries, 70 yards
- CAR – Jonathan Stewart: 24 carries, 82 yards, 1 TD

**Top receivers**

- IND – Coby Fleener: 7 receptions, 43 yards, 1 TD
- CAR – Greg Olsen: 6 receptions, 79 yards, 1 TD

**Top tacklers**

- IND – D'Qwell Jackson: 3 tackles, 10 assists
- CAR – Luke Kuechly: 9 tackles, 5 assists, 1 interception

The Colts traveled to Charlotte to take on Cam Newton and his undefeated Carolina Panthers, looking to hang their first loss on them. After struggling much in the first half, the Colts answered back in the fourth quarter. However, it wasn't enough to stop the Panthers in overtime and the Colts would lose 29–26.

==== Week 9: vs. Denver Broncos ====
Week Nine: Denver Broncos at Indianapolis Colts – Game summary

Quarter	1	2	3	4	Total
Broncos	0	7	10	7	**24**
**Colts**	7	10	0	10	**27**

at Lucas Oil Stadium, Indianapolis, Indiana

- Date: November 8
- Game time: 4:25 p.m. EST
- Game weather: 54 °F (12 °C), sunny — retractable roof open
- Game attendance: 66,894
- Referee: Brad Allen
- TV announcers (CBS): Jim Nantz (play-by-play), Phil Simms (color commentator) and Tracy Wolfson (sideline reporter)
- Recap, Gamebook

Game information

**First quarter**

- IND – 6:48 Frank Gore 7-yard TD run, Adam Vinatieri kick. **Drive** 7 plays, 80 yards, 3:42. (IND 7–0)

**Second quarter**

- IND – 12:13 Adam Vinatieri 43-yard FG. **Drive** 9 plays, 63 yards, 6:01. (IND 10–0)
- IND – 7:12 Jack Doyle 3-yard TD pass from Andrew Luck, Adam Vinatieri kick. **Drive** 8 plays, 63 yards, 3:43. (IND 17–0)
- DEN – 0:00 Omar Bolden 83-yard punt return for a TD, Brandon McManus kick. (IND 17–7)

**Third quarter**

- DEN – 11:27 Emmanuel Sanders 64-yard TD pass from Peyton Manning, Brandon McManus kick. **Drive** 3 plays, 60 yards, 1:23. (IND 17–14)
- DEN – 4:57 Brandon McManus 29-yard FG. **Drive** 10 plays, 79 yards, 4:40. (17–17)

**Fourth quarter**

- IND – 14:05 Ahmad Bradshaw 8-yard TD pass from Andrew Luck, Adam Vinatieri kick. **Drive** 12 plays, 80 yards, 5:52. (IND 24–17)
- DEN – 8:54 Owen Daniels 1-yard TD pass from Peyton Manning, Brandon McManus kick. **Drive** 9 plays, 80 yards, 5:11. (24–24)
- IND – 6:13 Adam Vinatieri 55-yard FG. **Drive** 7 plays, 33 yards, 2:41. (IND 27–24)

**Top passers**

- DEN – Peyton Manning: 21/36, 281 yards, 2 TDs, 2 INTs
- IND – Andrew Luck: 21/36, 252 yards, 2 TDs

**Top rushers**

- DEN – C. J. Anderson: 7 carries, 34 yards
- IND – Frank Gore: 28 carries, 83 yards, 1 TD

**Top receivers**

- DEN – Owen Daniels: 6 receptions, 102 yards, 1 TD
- IND – T. Y. Hilton: 5 receptions, 82 yards

**Top tacklers**

- DEN – Danny Trevathan: 6 tackles, 13 assists
- IND – Kendall Langford: 3 tackles, 3 assists, 1 sack

Peyton Manning returned to Indianapolis for the final time.

Late in the fourth quarter, with the Colts leading 27–24, they looked to extend the lead on a field goal by Adam Vinatieri, but it was overturned and the Colts still won 27–24.

With the win, the Colts went to 4–5, while the Broncos suffered their first loss and dropped to 7–1.

However, two days later, Andrew Luck was hospitalized with a lacerated kidney along with an abdominal injury. He ended up missing the rest of the season, putting more pressure on veteran backup Matt Hasselbeck, who was 2–0 in 2 starts due to Luck's previous injury.

==== Week 11: at Atlanta Falcons ====
Week Eleven: Indianapolis Colts at Atlanta Falcons – Game summary

Quarter	1	2	3	4	Total
**Colts**	0	7	7	10	**24**
Falcons	7	7	7	0	**21**

at Georgia Dome, Atlanta

- Date: November 22
- Game time: 1:00 p.m. EST
- Game weather: Played indoors (dome stadium)
- Game attendance: 70,433
- Referee: Walt Anderson
- TV announcers (CBS): Greg Gumbel (play-by-play), Trent Green (color commentator) and Jamie Erdahl (sideline reporter)
- Recap, Gamebook

Game information

**First quarter**

- ATL – 0:02 Patrick DiMarco 15-yard pass from Matt Ryan, Matt Bryant kick. **Drive** 12 plays, 80 yards, 5:28. (ATL 7–0)

**Second quarter**

- ATL – 8:54 Patrick DiMarco 1-yard TD pass from Matt Ryan, Matt Bryant kick. **Drive** 10 plays, 83 yards, 4:18. (ATL 14–0)
- IND – 1:55 Ahmad Bradshaw 7-yard TD pass from Matt Hasselbeck, Adam Vinatieri kick. **Drive** 13 plays, 80 yards, 6:59. (ATL 14–7)

**Third quarter**

- ATL – 9:38 Leonard Hankerson 3-yard TD pass from Matt Ryan, Matt Bryant kick. **Drive** 10 plays, 80 yards, 5:22. (ATL 21–7)
- IND – 0:10 Ahmad Bradshaw 2-yard TD pass from Matt Hasselbeck, Adam Vinatieri kick. **Drive** 10 plays, 90 yards, 4:58. (ATL 21–14)

**Fourth quarter**

- IND – 10:07 D'Qwell Jackson 6-yard interception return for a TD, Adam Vinatieri kick. (21–21)
- IND – 0:52 Adam Vinatieri 43-yard FG. **Drive** 9 plays, 56 yards, 4:02. (IND 24–21)

**Top passers**

- IND – Matt Hasselbeck: 23/32, 213 yards, 2 TDs, 2 INTs
- ATL – Matt Ryan: 25/46, 280 yards, 3 TDs, 3 INTs

**Top rushers**

- IND – Frank Gore: 14 carries, 34 yards
- ATL – Tevin Coleman: 17 carries, 48 yards

**Top receivers**

- IND – Frank Gore: 5 receptions, 46 yards
- ATL – Julio Jones: 9 receptions, 160 yards

**Top tacklers**

- IND – Jerrell Freeman: 7 tackles, 2 assists
- ATL – Justin Durant: 7 tackles, 2 assists

The Colts would trail 21–7 late in the third quarter, but they would fight back to tie the game at 21 after D'Qwell Jackson returned an interception at the Atlanta 6-yard line for a touchdown. The Colts would then later on march down the field to win it with an Adam Vinatieri field goal with 52 seconds left. With the win, the Colts improved to 5–5. They also improved to 14–2 all time against the Falcons.

==== Week 12: vs. Tampa Bay Buccaneers ====
Week Twelve: Tampa Bay Buccaneers at Indianapolis Colts – Game summary

Quarter	1	2	3	4	Total
Buccaneers	3	9	0	0	**12**
**Colts**	3	3	13	6	**25**

at Lucas Oil Stadium, Indianapolis, Indiana

- Date: November 29
- Game time: 1:00 p.m. EST
- Game weather: 37 °F (3 °C), partly cloudy — retractable roof open
- Game attendance: 65,696
- Referee: Walt Coleman
- TV announcers (Fox): Dick Stockton (play-by-play), Matt Millen (color commentator) and Peter Schrager (sideline reporter)
- Recap Gamebook

Game information

**First quarter**

- IND – 8:13 Adam Vinatieri 49-yard FG. **Drive** 15 plays, 52 yards, 6:47. (IND 3–0)
- TB – 2:50 Connor Barth 38-yard FG. **Drive** 12 plays, 60 yards, 5:23. (3–3)

**Second quarter**

- IND – 12:44 Adam Vinatieri 27-yard FG. **Drive** 11 plays, 76 yards, 5:06. (IND 6–3)
- TB – 5:38 Connor Barth 30-yard FG. **Drive** 15 plays, 68 yards, 7:06. (6–6)
- TB – 1:54 Cameron Brate 20-yard TD pass from Jameis Winston, Connor Barth kick failed, wide left. **Drive** 5 plays, 76 yards, 2:40. (TB 12–6)

**Third quarter**

- IND – 10:01 Adam Vinatieri 26-yard FG. **Drive** 8 plays, 56 yards, 3:04. (TB 12–9)
- IND – 7:22 T. Y. Hilton 19-yard TD pass from Matt Hasselbeck, Adam Vinatieri kick. **Drive** 3 plays, 46 yards, 1:05. (IND 16–12)
- IND – 1:02 Adam Vinatieri 44-yard FG. **Drive** 7 plays, 15 yards, 2:55. (IND 19–12)

**Fourth quarter**

- IND – 5:53 T. Y. Hilton 3-yard TD pass from Matt Hasselbeck, Adam Vinatieri kick failed, wide left. **Drive** 15 plays, 76 yards, 7:30. (IND 25–12)

**Top passers**

- TB – Jameis Winston: 20/36, 245 yards, 1 TD, 1 INT
- IND – Matt Hasselbeck: 26/42, 315 yards, 2 TDs

**Top rushers**

- TB – Doug Martin: 14 carries, 97 yards
- IND – Frank Gore: 19 carries, 24 yards

**Top receivers**

- TB – Mike Evans: 5 receptions, 64 yards
- IND – Donte Moncrief: 8 receptions, 114 yards

**Top tacklers**

- TB – Kwon Alexander: 7 tackles, 3 assists
- IND – D'Qwell Jackson: 6 tackles, 5 assists, 1 sack

With the win, the Colts improved to 6–5 (2–2 against the NFC South) and remained in the playoff hunt.

==== Week 13: at Pittsburgh Steelers ====
Week Thirteen: Indianapolis Colts at Pittsburgh Steelers – Game summary

Quarter	1	2	3	4	Total
Colts	3	7	0	0	**10**
**Steelers**	6	15	7	17	**45**

at Heinz Field, Pittsburgh, Pennsylvania

- Date: December 6
- Game time: 8:30 p.m. EST
- Game weather: 37 °F (3 °C), partly cloudy
- Game attendance: 58,701
- Referee: Ron Torbert
- TV announcers (NBC): Al Michaels, Cris Collinsworth and Michele Tafoya
- Recap, Gamebook

Game information

**First quarter**

- IND – 10:19 Adam Vinatieri 35-yard FG. **Drive** 4 plays, 8 yards, 1:59. (IND 3–0)
- PIT – 5:27 Chris Boswell 29-yard FG. **Drive** 10 plays, 69 yards, 4:52. (3–3)
- PIT – 3:15 Chris Boswell 51-yard FG. **Drive** 4 plays, 5 yards, 0:49. (PIT 6–3)

**Second quarter**

- IND – 8:26 Frank Gore 9-yard TD pass from Matt Hasselbeck, Adam Vinatieri kick. **Drive** 4 plays, 46 yards, 2:28. (IND 10–6)
- PIT – 4:04 Antonio Brown 7-yard TD pass from Ben Roethlisberger, 2-point conversion successful (Ben Roethlisberger pass to Will Johnson). **Drive** 10 plays, 80 yards, 4:22. (PIT 14–10)
- PIT – 0:10 Markus Wheaton 5-yard TD pass from Ben Roethlisberger, Chris Boswell kick. **Drive** 8 plays, 60 yards, 1:38. (PIT 21–10)

**Third quarter**

- PIT – 12:35 Martavis Bryant 68-yard TD pass from Ben Roethlisberger, Chris Boswell kick. **Drive** 3 plays, 75 yards, 1:23. (PIT 28–10)

**Fourth quarter**

- PIT – 14:11 Antonio Brown 5-yard TD pass from Ben Roethlisberger, Chris Boswell kick. **Drive** 10 plays, 85 yards, 4:23. (PIT 35–10)
- PIT – 6:29 Chris Boswell 42-yard FG. **Drive** 11 plays, 54 yards, 6:24. (PIT 38–10)
- PIT – 4:01 Antonio Brown 71-yard punt return for a TD, Chris Boswell kick. (PIT 45–10)

**Top passers**

- IND – Matt Hasselbeck: 16/26, 169 yards, 1 TD, 2 INTs
- PIT – Ben Roethlisberger: 24/39, 364 yards, 4 TDs

**Top rushers**

- IND – Frank Gore: 13 carries, 45 yards
- PIT – DeAngelo Williams: 26 carries, 134 yards

**Top receivers**

- IND – Coby Fleener: 4 receptions, 20 yards
- PIT – Antonio Brown: 8 receptions, 118 yards, 2 TDs

**Top tacklers**

- IND – Mike Adams: 11 tackles, 1 assist, 1 forced fumble
- PIT – Lawrence Timmons: 7 tackles, 1 assist

The Colts would suffer an embarrassing loss on national television to the Pittsburgh Steelers. The Steelers would lead for the majority of the game, and the Colts could not get into any rhythm. With the loss, the Colts fell to 6–6.

==== Week 14: at Jacksonville Jaguars ====
Week Fourteen: Indianapolis Colts at Jacksonville Jaguars – Game summary

Quarter	1	2	3	4	Total
Colts	3	10	3	0	**16**
**Jaguars**	3	6	21	21	**51**

at EverBank Field, Jacksonville, Florida

- Date: December 13
- Game time: 1:00 p.m. EST
- Game weather: 79 °F (26 °C), clear
- Game attendance: 62,372
- Referee: Carl Cheffers
- TV announcers (CBS): Tom McCarthy (play-by-play) and Adam Archuleta (color commentator)
- Recap, Gamebook

Game information

**First quarter** **Second quarter** **Third quarter** **Fourth quarter**

**Top passers**

- IND –
- JAX –

**Top rushers**

- IND –
- JAX –

**Top receivers**

- IND –
- JAX –

**Top tacklers**

- IND –
- JAX –

The Colts would lead 13–3, but Jacksonville would outscore Indianapolis 48–3 from then on. With the loss, the Colts fell to 6–7 and lost to a divisional opponent for the first time since 2012, snapping their NFL record 16-game winning streak in division play.

==== Week 15: vs. Houston Texans ====
Week Fifteen: Houston Texans at Indianapolis Colts – Game summary

Quarter	1	2	3	4	Total
**Texans**	0	3	3	10	**16**
Colts	0	10	0	0	**10**

at Lucas Oil Stadium, Indianapolis, Indiana

- Date: December 20
- Game time: 1:00 p.m. EST
- Game weather: Played indoors (retractable roof closed)
- Game attendance: 66,083
- Referee: Ed Hochuli
- TV announcers (CBS): Greg Gumbel (play-by-play), Trent Green (color commentator) and Jamie Erdahl (sideline reporter)
- Recap, Gamebook

Game information

**First quarter** **Second quarter** **Third quarter** **Fourth quarter**

**Top passers**

- HOU –
- IND –

**Top rushers**

- HOU –
- IND –

**Top receivers**

- HOU –
- IND –

**Top tacklers**

- HOU –
- IND –

This, notably, is the Colts' first loss to the Texans at Lucas Oil Stadium since the latter team began play in 2002.

==== Week 16: at Miami Dolphins ====
Week Sixteen: Indianapolis Colts at Miami Dolphins – Game summary

Quarter	1	2	3	4	Total
**Colts**	8	7	0	3	**18**
Dolphins	0	6	3	3	**12**

at Sun Life Stadium, Miami Gardens, Florida

- Date: December 27
- Game time: 1:00 p.m. EST
- Game weather: 82 °F (28 °C), partly cloudy
- Game attendance: 65,482
- Referee: Gene Steratore
- TV announcers (Fox): Dick Stockton (play-by-play), David Diehl (color commentator) and Kristina Pink (sideline reporter)
- Recap, Gamebook

Game information

**First quarter** **Second quarter** **Third quarter** **Fourth quarter**

**Top passers**

- IND –
- MIA –

**Top rushers**

- IND –
- MIA –

**Top receivers**

- IND –
- MIA –

**Top tacklers**

- IND –
- MIA –

With the win, the Colts improved to 7–8, finishing 4–4 on the road and 1–3 against the AFC East. This was Matt Hasselbeck's final career game.

==== Week 17: vs. Tennessee Titans ====
Week Seventeen: Tennessee Titans at Indianapolis Colts – Game summary

Quarter	1	2	3	4	Total
Titans	7	7	3	7	**24**
**Colts**	10	10	7	3	**30**

at Lucas Oil Stadium, Indianapolis, Indiana

- Date: January 3, 2016
- Game time: 1:00 p.m. EST
- Game weather: Played indoors (retractable roof closed)
- Game attendance: 65,733
- Referee: Clete Blakeman
- TV announcers (CBS): Andrew Catalon (play-by-play), Steve Beuerlein and Steve Tasker (color commentators)
- Recap, Gamebook

Game information

**First quarter** **Second quarter** **Third quarter** **Fourth quarter**

**Top passers**

- TEN –
- IND –

**Top rushers**

- TEN –
- IND –

**Top receivers**

- TEN –
- IND –

**Top tacklers**

- TEN –
- IND –

With the win, the Colts ended their season at 8–8 and won their 9th straight game against the Titans. However, as a result of Houston's win over Jacksonville, the Colts were eliminated from the playoffs for the 1st time 2011. Indianapolis would finish 4–4 at home and 4–2 against the AFC South.

== Standings ==
=== Division ===
AFC South
	W	L	T	PCT	DIV	CONF	PF	PA	STK
^{(4)} Houston Texans	9	7	0	.563	5–1	7–5	339	313	W3
Indianapolis Colts	8	8	0	.500	4–2	6–6	333	408	W2
Jacksonville Jaguars	5	11	0	.313	2–4	5–7	376	448	L3
Tennessee Titans	3	13	0	.188	1–5	1–11	299	423	L4

=== Conference ===
AFC
#	Team	Division	W	L	T	PCT	DIV	CONF	SOS	SOV	STK
Division Leaders
1 (Note: Denver finished ahead of New England and Cincinnati for the No. 1 seed based on head-to-head sweep. New England finished ahead of Cincinnati for the No. 2 seed based on record vs. common opponents — New England's cumulative record against Buffalo, Denver, Houston and Pittsburgh was 4–1, while Cincinnati's cumulative record against the same four teams was 2–3.)	Denver Broncos	West	12	4	0	.750	4–2	8–4	.500	.479	W2
2	New England Patriots	East	12	4	0	.750	4–2	9–3	.473	.448	L2
3	Cincinnati Bengals	North	12	4	0	.750	5–1	9–3	.477	.406	W1
4	Houston Texans	South	9	7	0	.563	5–1	7–5	.496	.410	W3
Wild Cards
5	Kansas City Chiefs	West	11	5	0	.688	5–1	10–2	.496	.432	W10
6 (Note: Pittsburgh finished ahead of the New York Jets for the No. 6 seed and qualified for the last playoff spot based on record vs. common opponents — Pittsburgh's cumulative record against Cleveland, Indianapolis, New England and Oakland was 4–1, while the Jets' cumulative record against the same four teams was 3–2.)	Pittsburgh Steelers	North	10	6	0	.625	3–3	7–5	.504	.463	W1
Did not qualify for the postseason
7	New York Jets	East	10	6	0	.625	3–3	7–5	.441	.388	L1
8 (Note: Buffalo finished ahead of Indianapolis based on head-to-head victory.)	Buffalo Bills	East	8	8	0	.500	4–2	7–5	.508	.438	W2
9	Indianapolis Colts	South	8	8	0	.500	4–2	6–6	.500	.406	W2
10	Oakland Raiders	West	7	9	0	.438	3–3	7–5	.512	.366	L1
11	Miami Dolphins	East	6	10	0	.375	1–5	4–8	.469	.469	W2
12 (Note: Jacksonville finished ahead of Baltimore based on head-to-head victory.)	Jacksonville Jaguars	South	5	11	0	.313	2–4	5–7	.473	.375	L3
13	Baltimore Ravens	North	5	11	0	.313	3–3	4–8	.508	.425	L1
14	San Diego Chargers	West	4	12	0	.250	0–6	3–9	.527	.328	L2
15 (Note: Cleveland finished ahead of Tennessee based on head-to-head victory.)	Cleveland Browns	North	3	13	0	.188	1–5	2–10	.531	.271	L3
16	Tennessee Titans	South	3	13	0	.188	1–5	1–11	.492	.375	L4
Tiebreakers (Note: When breaking ties for three or more teams under the NFL's rules, they are first broken within divisions, then comparing only the highest ranked remaining team from each division.)
