= 2014 Brown Bears football team =

American college football season

2014 Brown Bears football
- Conference: Ivy League
- Record: 5–5 (3–4 Ivy)
- Head coach: Phil Estes (17th season)
- Offensive coordinator: Frank Sheehan (9th season)
- Offensive scheme: Pro-style
- Defensive coordinator: Michael Kelleher (14th season)
- Base defense: 4–3
- Home stadium: Brown Stadium

2014 Ivy League football standings
	Conf.			Overall
Team	W		L	W		L
No. 15 Harvard $	7	–	0	10	–	0
Dartmouth	6	–	1	8	–	2
Yale	5	–	2	8	–	2
Princeton	4	–	3	5	–	5
Brown	3	–	4	5	–	5
Penn	2	–	5	2	–	8
Cornell	1	–	6	1	–	9
Columbia	0	–	7	0	–	10
$ – Conference champion; Rankings from The Sports Network Poll

The 2014 Brown Bears football team represented Brown University as a member of the Ivy League during the 2014 NCAA Division I FCS football season. Led by 17th-year head coach Phil Estes, the Bears compiled an overall record of 5–5 with a mark of 3–4 in conference play, placing fifth in the Ivy League. Brown played home games at Brown Stadium in Providence, Rhode Island.

== Schedule ==
Date	Time	Opponent	Site	TV	Result	Attendance
September 20	12:00 p.m.	at Georgetown*	Multi-Sport Field; Washington, DC		L 3–17	2,262
September 27	6:00 p.m.	Harvard	Brown Stadium; Providence, RI		L 14–22	13,511
October 4	1:00 p.m.	at Rhode Island*	Meade Stadium; Kingston, RI (rivalry)		W 20–13	4,205
October 11	12:30 p.m.	Holy Cross*	Brown Stadium; Providence, RI		W 27–24 ^{2OT}	1,904
October 18	3:30 p.m.	at Princeton	Powers Field at Princeton Stadium; Princeton, NJ	CSN	L 16–27	5,807
October 25	12:30 p.m.	Cornell	Brown Stadium; Providence, RI		W 42–16	6,880
November 1	1:00 p.m.	at Penn	Franklin Field; Philadelphia, PA		W 21–13	8,176
November 8	12:30 p.m.	Yale	Brown Stadium; Providence, RI	FCS	L 42–45	4,350
November 15	12:00 p.m.	at Dartmouth	Memorial Stadium; Hanover, NH	CSN	L 21–44	4,057
November 22	12:30 p.m.	Columbia	Brown Stadium; Providence, RI	FCS	W 41–7	1,863
*Non-conference game; All times are in Eastern time
