= 2014 Bucknell Bison football team =

American college football season

2014 Bucknell Bison football
- Conference: Patriot League
- Record: 8–3 (4–2 Patriot)
- Head coach: Joe Susan (5th season)
- Home stadium: Christy Mathewson–Memorial Stadium

2014 Patriot League football standings
	Conf.			Overall
Team	W		L	W		L
No. 11 Fordham $^	6	–	0	11	–	3
Bucknell	4	–	2	8	–	3
Lafayette	3	–	3	5	–	6
Colgate	3	–	3	5	–	7
Holy Cross	2	–	4	4	–	8
Lehigh	2	–	4	3	–	8
Georgetown	1	–	5	3	–	8
$ – Conference champion; ^ – FCS playoff participant; Rankings from The Sports Network poll

The 2014 Bucknell Bison football team represented Bucknell University as a member of the Patriot League during the 2014 NCAA Division I FCS football season. Led by fifth-year head coach Joe Susan, the Bison compiled an overall record of 8–3 with a mark of 4–2 in conference play, placing second in the Patriot League. Bucknell played home games at Christy Mathewson–Memorial Stadium in Lewisburg, Pennsylvania.

== Schedule ==
Date	Time	Opponent	Site	TV	Result	Attendance
August 30	6:00 pm	VMI*	Christy Mathewson–Memorial Stadium; Lewisburg, PA	PLN	W 42–38	3,124
September 6	6:00 pm	at Marist*	Tenney Stadium at Leonidoff Field; Poughkeepsie, NY		W 22–0	2,313
September 20	1:00 pm	at Sacred Heart*	Campus Field; Fairfield, CT		W 36–20	3,471
September 27	6:00 pm	Cornell*	Christy Mathewson–Memorial Stadium; Lewisburg, PA	PLN	W 20–7	5,578
October 4	1:00 pm	at Bryant*	Bulldog Stadium; Smithfield, RI		L 15–34	2,107
October 11	12:30 pm	at Lehigh	Goodman Stadium; Bethlehem, PA	PLN	W 45–24	4,984
October 25	2:00 pm	at Georgetown	Multi-Sport Field; Washington, DC		W 22–17	2,437
November 1	1:00 pm	Lafayette^{†}	Christy Mathewson–Memorial Stadium; Lewisburg, PA	PLN	W 27–24 ^{OT}	3,056
November 7	6:30 pm	No. 9 Fordham	Christy Mathewson–Memorial Stadium; Lewisburg, PA	CBSSN	L 27–30 ^{OT}	3,815
November 15	12:30 pm	at Holy Cross	Fitton Field; Worcester, MA	PLN	W 31–24 ^{OT}	5,043
November 22	1:00 pm	Colgate	Christy Mathewson–Memorial Stadium; Lewisburg, PA	PLN	L 6–21	2,077
*Non-conference game; ^{†}Homecoming; Rankings from The Sports Network Poll released prior to the game; All times are in Eastern time
