= 2014 Columbia Lions football team =

American college football season

2014 Columbia Lions football
- Conference: Ivy League
- Record: 0–10 (0–7 Ivy)
- Head coach: Pete Mangurian (3rd season)
- Offensive coordinator: Jaime Elizondo (3rd season)
- Defensive coordinator: Chris Rippon (2nd season)
- Home stadium: Robert K. Kraft Field at Lawrence A. Wien Stadium

2014 Ivy League football standings
	Conf.			Overall
Team	W		L	W		L
No. 15 Harvard $	7	–	0	10	–	0
Dartmouth	6	–	1	8	–	2
Yale	5	–	2	8	–	2
Princeton	4	–	3	5	–	5
Brown	3	–	4	5	–	5
Penn	2	–	5	2	–	8
Cornell	1	–	6	1	–	9
Columbia	0	–	7	0	–	10
$ – Conference champion; Rankings from The Sports Network Poll

The 2014 Columbia Lions football team represented Columbia University in the 2014 NCAA Division I FCS football season. They were led by third year head coach Pete Mangurian and played their home games at Robert K. Kraft Field at Lawrence A. Wien Stadium. They were a member of the Ivy League. They finished the season 0–10, 0–7 in Ivy League play to finish in last place. This was the seventh time, and second consecutive year, the school ended the season winless. Columbia averaged 5,574 fans per game.

On December 5, 2014, amid allegations of mistreatment of players, head coach Pete Mangurian resigned. He had a three year record at Columbia of 3–27 and lost his last 21 games.

== Schedule ==
Date	Time	Opponent	Site	TV	Result	Attendance
September 20	12:30 p.m.	No. 18 Fordham*	Robert K. Kraft Field at Lawrence A. Wien Stadium; New York, NY (Liberty Cup)		L 7–49	4,805
September 27	6:00 p.m.	at No. 24 Albany*	Bob Ford Field; Albany, NY		L 7–42	5,107
October 4	12:30 p.m.	Princeton	Robert K. Kraft Field at Lawrence A. Wien Stadium; New York, NY		L 6–38	3,321
October 11	1:00 p.m.	at Monmouth*	Kessler Field; West Long Branch, NJ		L 28–61	2,627
October 18	1:00 p.m.	at Penn	Franklin Field; Philadelphia, PA		L 7–31	8,966
October 25	1:30 p.m.	Dartmouth^{†}	Robert K. Kraft Field at Lawrence A. Wien Stadium; New York, NY		L 7–27	11,202
November 1	12:30 p.m.	Yale	Robert K. Kraft Field at Lawrence A. Wien Stadium; New York, NY		L 7–25	2,808
November 8	1:00 p.m.	at No. 18 Harvard	Harvard Stadium; Boston, MA	ESPN3	L 0–45	12,552
November 15	12:30 p.m.	Cornell	Robert K. Kraft Field at Lawrence A. Wien Stadium; New York, NY (rivalry)	FCS	L 27–30	5,734
November 22	12:30 p.m.	at Brown	Brown Stadium; Providence, RI	FCS	L 7–41	1,863
*Non-conference game; ^{†}Homecoming; Rankings from The Sports Network Poll released prior to the game; All times are in Eastern time
