= 2014 Dartmouth Big Green football team =

American college football season

2014 Dartmouth Big Green football
- Conference: Ivy League
- Record: 8–2 (6–1 Ivy)
- Head coach: Buddy Teevens (15th season)
- Offensive coordinator: Keith Clark (5th season)
- Offensive scheme: Multiple
- Defensive coordinator: Don Dobes (5th season)
- Base defense: 4–3
- Home stadium: Memorial Field

2014 Ivy League football standings
	Conf.			Overall
Team	W		L	W		L
No. 15 Harvard $	7	–	0	10	–	0
Dartmouth	6	–	1	8	–	2
Yale	5	–	2	8	–	2
Princeton	4	–	3	5	–	5
Brown	3	–	4	5	–	5
Penn	2	–	5	2	–	8
Cornell	1	–	6	1	–	9
Columbia	0	–	7	0	–	10
$ – Conference champion; Rankings from The Sports Network Poll

The 2014 Dartmouth Big Green football team represented Dartmouth College in the 2014 NCAA Division I FCS football season. The Big Green were led by head coach Buddy Teevens in his tenth straight year and 15th overall and played their home games at Memorial Field. They were a member of the Ivy League. They finished the season 8–2 overall and 6–1 in Ivy League play to place second. Dartmouth averaged 5,549 fans per game.

== Schedule ==
Date	Time	Opponent	Site	TV	Result	Attendance
September 20	7:00 p.m.	Central Connecticut*	Memorial Field; Hanover, NH		W 35–25	7,234
September 27	6:00 p.m.	at No. 4 New Hampshire*	Cowell Stadium; Durham, NH (rivalry)		L 19–52	8,753
October 4	1:30 p.m.	Penn	Memorial Field; Hanover, NH	FCS	W 31–13	3,288
October 11	1:00 p.m.	at Yale	Yale Bowl; New Haven, CT		W 38–31	6,241
October 18	1:30 p.m.	Holy Cross*^{†}	Memorial Field; Hanover, NH		W 24–21	7,335
October 25	1:30 p.m.	at Columbia	Wien Stadium; New York, NY		W 27–7	11,202
November 1	3:30 p.m.	No. 20 Harvard	Memorial Field; Hanover, NH (rivalry)	CSN	L 12–23	5,833
November 8	12:30 p.m.	at Cornell	Schoellkopf Field; Ithaca, NY (rivalry)		W 42–7	4,212
November 15	12:00 p.m.	Brown	Memorial Field; Hanover, NH	CSN	W 44–21	4,057
November 22	1:00 p.m.	at Princeton	Powers Field at Princeton Stadium; Princeton, NJ	ESPN3	W 41–10	6,663
*Non-conference game; ^{†}Homecoming; Rankings from The Sports Network Poll released prior to the game; All times are in Eastern time
