= 2014 Fordham Rams football team =

American college football season

2014 Fordham Rams football

Patriot League champion

NCAA Division I Second Round, L 19–44 at New Hampshire
- Conference: Patriot League

Ranking
- Sports Network: No. 11
- FCS Coaches: No. 14
- Record: 11–3 (6–0 Patriot)
- Head coach: Joe Moorhead (3rd season)
- Offensive coordinator: Andrew Breiner (3rd season)
- Co-defensive coordinators: Jon Wholley (1st season); Tim Cary (1st season)
- Home stadium: Coffey Field

2014 Patriot League football standings
	Conf.			Overall
Team	W		L	W		L
No. 11 Fordham $^	6	–	0	11	–	3
Bucknell	4	–	2	8	–	3
Lafayette	3	–	3	5	–	6
Colgate	3	–	3	5	–	7
Holy Cross	2	–	4	4	–	8
Lehigh	2	–	4	3	–	8
Georgetown	1	–	5	3	–	8
$ – Conference champion; ^ – FCS playoff participant; Rankings from The Sports Network poll

The 2014 Fordham Rams football team represented Fordham University as a member of the Patriot League during the 2014 NCAA Division I FCS football season. Led by third-year head coach Joe Moorhead, the Rams compiled an overall record of 11–3 with a mark of 6–0 in conference play, winning the Patriot League title. Fordham received the conference's automatic bid to the NCAA Division I Football Championship playoffs, where the Rams beat Sacred Heart in the first round before losing to New Hampshire in the second round. The team played home games at Coffey Field in The Bronx.

== Schedule ==
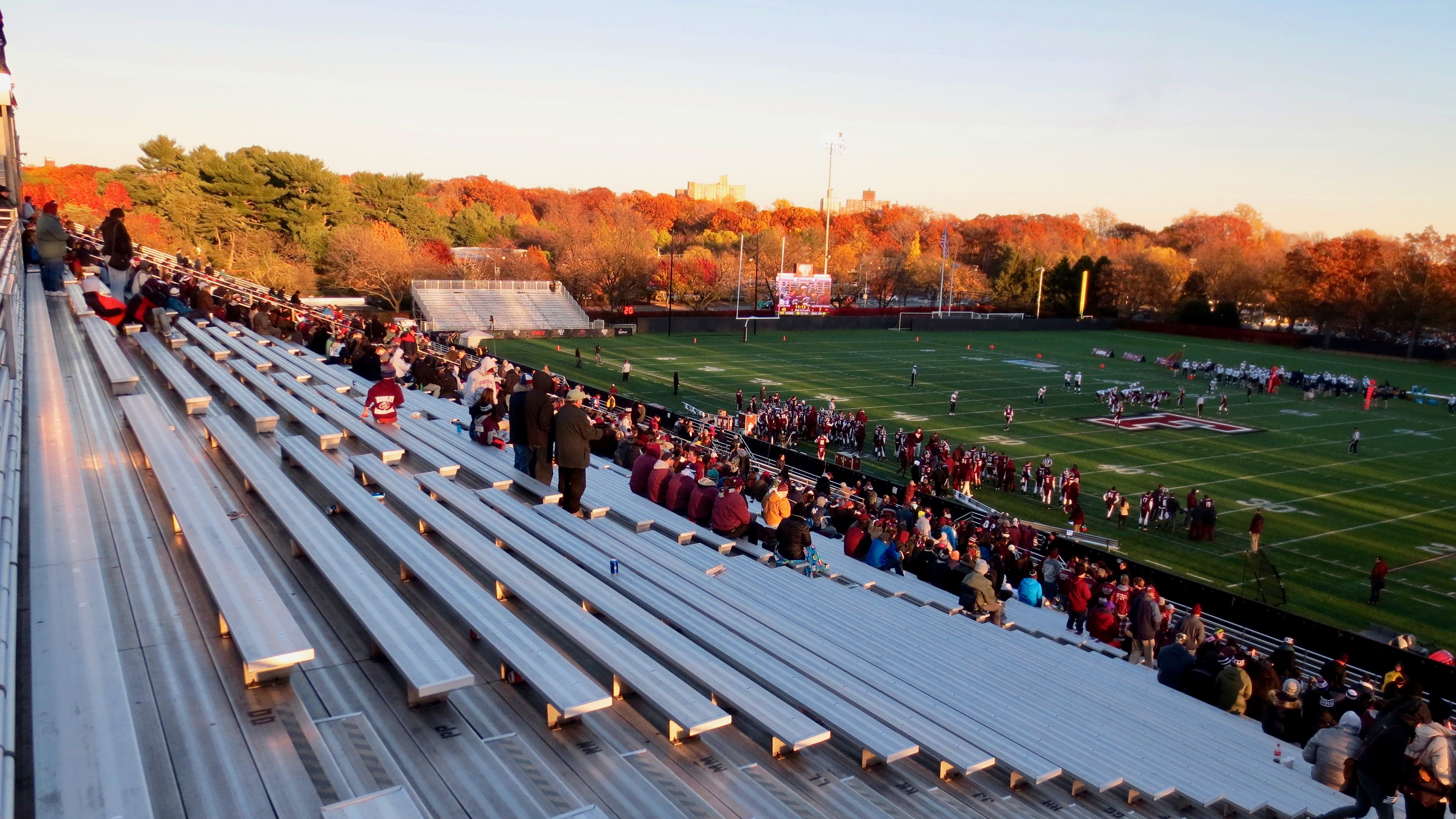
Fordham vs. Georgetown

Date	Time	Opponent	Rank	Site	TV	Result	Attendance
August 30	6:00 pm	Saint Francis (PA)*	No. 11	Coffey Field; Bronx, NY	PLN	W 52–23	3,462
September 6	3:30 pm	at No. 10 Villanova*	No. 11	Villanova Stadium; Villanova, PA	ASN	L 6–50	6,151
September 13	1:00 pm	Rhode Island*^{†}	No. 19	Coffey Field; Bronx, NY	PLN	W 54–7	6,979
September 20	12:30 pm	at Columbia*	No. 18	Robert K. Kraft Field at Lawrence A. Wien Stadium; Manhattan, NY (Liberty Cup)		W 49–7	4,805
September 27	1:00 pm	at Holy Cross	No. 16	Fitton Field; Worcester, MA (Ram–Crusader Cup)	PLN	W 45–16	10,002
October 3	6:30 pm	Lafayette	No. 16	Coffey Field; Bronx, NY	CBSSN	W 42–18	4,376
October 11	1:00 pm	Penn*	No. 14	Coffey Field; Bronx, NY	PLN	W 60–22	3,081
October 25	12:30 pm	at Lehigh	No. 12	Goodman Stadium; Bethlehem, PA	PLN	W 48–27	9,372
November 1	1:00 pm	Colgate	No. 10	Coffey Field; Bronx, NY	PLN	W 37–13	6,622
November 7	6:30 pm	at Bucknell	No. 9	Christy Mathewson–Memorial Stadium; Lewisburg, PA	CBSSN	W 30–27 ^{OT}	3,815
November 15	1:00 pm	Georgetown	No. 7	Coffey Field; Bronx, NY	PLN	W 52–7	5,682
November 22	12:00 pm	at Army*	No. 7	Michie Stadium; West Point, NY	CBSSN	L 31–42	33,793
November 29	12:00 pm	Sacred Heart*	No. 9	Coffey Field; Bronx, NY (NCAA Division I First Round)	ESPN3	W 44–22	2,442
December 6	1:00 pm	at No. 1 New Hampshire*	No. 9	Cowell Stadium; Durham, NH (NCAA Division I Second Round)	ESPN3	L 19–44	4,021
*Non-conference game; ^{†}Homecoming; Rankings from The Sports Network Poll released prior to the game; All times are in Eastern time

== Ranking movements ==
Ranking movements Legend: ██ Increase in ranking ██ Decrease in ranking
	Week														
Poll	Pre	1	2	3	4	5	6	7	8	9	10	11	12	13	Final
Sports Network	11	11	19	18	16	16	14	12	12	10	9	7	7	9	11
Coaches	12	10	23	19	19	19	18	13	12	10	9	8	8	12	14
