= 2014 Georgetown Hoyas football team =

American college football season

2014 Georgetown Hoyas football
- Conference: Patriot League
- Record: 3–8 (1–5 Patriot)
- Head coach: Rob Sgarlata (1st season)
- Offensive coordinator: Michael Neuberger (1st season)
- Defensive coordinator: Luke Thompson (1st season)
- Home stadium: Multi-Sport Field

2014 Patriot League football standings
	Conf.			Overall
Team	W		L	W		L
No. 11 Fordham $^	6	–	0	11	–	3
Bucknell	4	–	2	8	–	3
Lafayette	3	–	3	5	–	6
Colgate	3	–	3	5	–	7
Holy Cross	2	–	4	4	–	8
Lehigh	2	–	4	3	–	8
Georgetown	1	–	5	3	–	8
$ – Conference champion; ^ – FCS playoff participant; Rankings from The Sports Network poll

The 2014 Georgetown Hoyas football team represented Georgetown University as a member of the Patriot League during the 2014 NCAA Division I FCS football season. Led by first-year head coach Rob Sgarlata, the Hoyas compiled an overall record of 3–8 with a mark of 1–5 in conference play, placing last out of seven teams in the Patriot League. Georgetown played home games at Multi-Sport Field in Washington, D.C.

== Schedule ==
Date	Time	Opponent	Site	TV	Result	Attendance
August 30	12:00 pm	Wagner*	Multi-Sport Field; Washington, DC		L 3–21	1,981
September 6	1:00 pm	at Dayton*	Welcome Stadium; Dayton, OH		L 14–23	3,468
September 15	6:00 pm	at Marist*	Tenney Stadium at Leonidoff Field; Poughkeepsie, NY		W 27–7	1,824
September 20	12:00 pm	Brown*	Multi-Sport Field; Washington, DC		W 17–3	2,262
September 27	12:00 pm	at Colgate	Crown Field at Andy Kerr Stadium; Hamilton, NY	ASN	L 0–19	4,199
October 4	12:00 pm	Harvard*	Multi-Sport Field; Washington, DC		L 3–34	2,502
October 11	3:30 pm	at Lafayette	Fisher Stadium; Easton, PA	PLN	L 21–24	3,361
October 25	2:00 pm	Bucknell^{†}	Multi-Sport Field; Washington, DC		L 17–22	2,437
November 1	12:00 pm	Lehigh	Multi-Sport Field; Washington, DC		L 19–27	1,981
November 15	1:00 pm	at No. 7 Fordham	Coffey Field; Bronx, NY	PLN	L 7–52	5,682
November 22	12:00 pm	Holy Cross	Multi-Sport Field; Washington, DC		W 21–16	1,583
*Non-conference game; ^{†}Homecoming; Rankings from The Sports Network Poll released prior to the game; All times are in Eastern time
