= 2014 Princeton Tigers football team =

American college football season

2014 Princeton Tigers football
- Conference: Ivy League
- Record: 5–5 (4–3 Ivy)
- Head coach: Bob Surace (5th season)
- Offensive coordinator: James Perry (5th season)
- Offensive scheme: Spread option
- Co-defensive coordinators: Steve Verbit (2nd season); Jim Salgado (2nd season)
- Base defense: 3–3–5 or 4–2–5
- Home stadium: Powers Field at Princeton Stadium

2014 Ivy League football standings
	Conf.			Overall
Team	W		L	W		L
No. 15 Harvard $	7	–	0	10	–	0
Dartmouth	6	–	1	8	–	2
Yale	5	–	2	8	–	2
Princeton	4	–	3	5	–	5
Brown	3	–	4	5	–	5
Penn	2	–	5	2	–	8
Cornell	1	–	6	1	–	9
Columbia	0	–	7	0	–	10
$ – Conference champion; Rankings from The Sports Network Poll

The 2014 Princeton Tigers football team represented Princeton University in the 2014 NCAA Division I FCS football season. They were led by fifth-year head coach Bob Surace and played their home games at Powers Field at Princeton Stadium. Princeton was a member of the Ivy League. They finished the season 5–5 overall and 4–3 in Ivy League play to place fourth. Princeton averaged 9,865 fans per game.

== Schedule ==
Date	Time	Opponent	Site	TV	Result	Attendance
September 20	4:00 p.m.	at San Diego*	Torero Stadium; San Diego, CA		L 29–39	3,324
September 27	6:00 p.m.	Davidson*	Powers Field at Princeton Stadium; Princeton, NJ		W 56–17	15,205
October 4	12:30 p.m.	at Columbia	Wien Stadium; New York, NY		W 38–6	3,321
October 11	1:00 p.m.	at Colgate*	Crown Field at Andy Kerr Stadium; Hamilton, NY		L 30–31	4,402
October 18	3:30 p.m.	Brown	Powers Field at Princeton Stadium; Princeton, NJ	CSN	W 27–16	5,807
October 25	1:00 p.m.	No. 21 Harvard	Powers Field at Princeton Stadium; Princeton, NJ (rivalry)	ESPN3	L 7–49	12,164
November 1	12:30 p.m.	at Cornell	Schoellkopf Field; Ithaca, NY	FCS	W 38–27	5,313
November 8	3:30 p.m.	Penn	Powers Field at Princeton Stadium; Princeton, NJ (rivalry)	NBCSN	W 22–17	9,486
November 15	12:30 p.m.	at Yale	Yale Bowl; New Haven, CT (rivalry)		L 30–44	23,260
November 22	1:00 p.m.	Dartmouth	Powers Field at Princeton Stadium; Princeton, NJ	ESPN3	L 10–41	6,663
*Non-conference game; Rankings from The Sports Network Poll released prior to the game; All times are in Eastern time
