= 2014 Holy Cross Crusaders football team =

American college football season

2014 Holy Cross Crusaders football
- Conference: Patriot League
- Record: 4–8 (4–4 Patriot)
- Head coach: Tom Gilmore (11th season)
- Offensive coordinator: Andy McKenzie (7th season)
- Defensive coordinator: Mike Kashurba (1st season)
- Home stadium: Fitton Field

2014 Patriot League football standings
	Conf.			Overall
Team	W		L	W		L
No. 11 Fordham $^	6	–	0	11	–	3
Bucknell	4	–	2	8	–	3
Lafayette	3	–	3	5	–	6
Colgate	3	–	3	5	–	7
Holy Cross	2	–	4	4	–	8
Lehigh	2	–	4	3	–	8
Georgetown	1	–	5	3	–	8
$ – Conference champion; ^ – FCS playoff participant; Rankings from The Sports Network poll

The 2014 Holy Cross Crusaders football team represented the College of the Holy Cross in the 2014 NCAA Division I FCS football season. They were led by 11th-year head coach Tom Gilmore and played their home games at Fitton Field. They were a member of the Patriot League. They finished the season 4–8, 2–4 in Patriot League play to finish in a tie for fifth place.

== Schedule ==
Date	Time	Opponent	Site	TV	Result	Attendance
August 30	6:00 pm	at Albany*	Bob Ford Field; Albany, NY	ESPN3	L 13–14	6,748
September 6	1:00 pm	Morgan State*	Fitton Field; Worcester, MA	WCTR	W 29–26	6,172
September 13	1:00 pm	Central Connecticut*	Fitton Field; Worcester, MA	PLN	W 20–7	6,379
September 19	7:00 pm	at Harvard*	Harvard Stadium; Boston, MA	ESPN3	L 18–41	15,132
September 27	1:00 pm	No. 16 Fordham^{†}	Fitton Field; Worcester, MA (Ram–Crusader Cup)	WCTR	L 16–45	10,002
October 4	1:00 pm	at Colgate	Crown Field at Andy Kerr Stadium; Hamilton, NY	PLN	L 17–20	3,720
October 11	12:30 pm	at Brown*	Brown Stadium; Providence, RI		L 24–27 ^{2OT}	1,904
October 18	1:30 pm	at Dartmouth*	Memorial Stadium; Hanover, NH		L 21–24	7,335
October 25	3:30 pm	at Lafayette	Fisher Stadium; Easton, PA	PLN	W 24–14	8,892
November 8	12:30 pm	Lehigh	Fitton Field; Worcester, MA	WCTR	W 27–20	6,142
November 15	12:30 pm	Bucknell	Fitton Field; Worcester, MA	WCTR	L 24–31 ^{OT}	5,043
November 22	12:00 pm	at Georgetown	Multi-Sport Field; Washington, DC		L 16–21	1,583
*Non-conference game; ^{†}Homecoming; Rankings from The Sports Network Poll released prior to the game; All times are in Eastern time
