= Chris Villarrial =

American football player and coach (born 1973)

Saint Francis Red Wolves
- Title: Head coach

Personal information
- Born: August 9, 1967 (age 59); Hummelstown, Pennsylvania, U.S.

Career information
- Position: Offensive guard
- College: IUP (1992–1995)
- NFL draft: 1996: 5th round, 152nd overall pick

Career history

Playing
- Chicago Bears (1996–2003); Buffalo Bills (2004–2006)

Coaching
- Central Cambria HS (2007–2008) Offensive coordinator; Saint Francis (PA) (2009) Offensive coordinator; Saint Francis (PA) (2010–present) Head coach

Awards and highlights
- Coaching: 2x NEC champion (2016, 2022)

Head coaching record
- Regular season: 68–96 (.415)
- Postseason: 0–2 (.000) (NCAA D-1 playoffs)
- Career: 68–98 (.410)
- Stats at Pro Football Reference

Chris Villarrial (born June 9, 1973) is an American college football coach and former professional player. He is the head football coach for Saint Francis University in Loretto, Pennsylvania, a position he has held since 2010. He played professionally as an offensive guard with the Chicago Bears and Buffalo Bills in the National Football League (NFL) for 11 seasons. He played college football at Indiana University of Pennsylvania (IUP).

== College career ==
After redshirting his first year at IUP, Villarrial began his college career as a reserve nose guard until moving to offensive right tackle midway through his freshman season. While playing for IUP, Villarrial was a three-year All-American and three-year all-conference player. He played in the 1993 Division II national championship game, and received the Jim Langer Award for Best Lineman in Division II in 1996. Villarrial had his college jersey No. 75 retired by IUP.

== Professional career ==
Villarrial was drafted in the fifth round (152nd overall) by Dave Wannstedt in April 1996. Prior to the draft, Villarrial broke the NFL Combine Bench Press Record. As a member of the Chicago Bears from to 1996 to 2003, Villarrial played six seasons under head coach Dick Jauron and was a two-year All-Pro player in addition to being named to the All-Joe Team. He paved the way for a 1,000-yard rusher every season, blocked for Anthony Thomas, who was the NFL Offensive Rookie of the Year in 2001, and was a member of an offensive line that gave up the fewest sacks in the NFL in 2001, when the Bears advanced to the NFC Divisional Playoff Game. He also received the Golden Bear Award, which was given to the rookie who has perfect attendance in the weight room.

In 2004, the Chicago Bears decided not to renew Villarrial’s contract and he was signed by the Buffalo Bills with head coach Mike Mularkey. Despite not starting, he was a member of an offensive line that gave up the fewest sacks in franchise history. Villarrial, who also played two seasons in Buffalo under coach Jauron, finished his NFL career with 148 starts.

== Coaching career ==
Following his professional career, Villarrial returned to Ebensburg, Pennsylvania, where he served two seasons as the offensive coordinator for the Central Cambria High School football team. He led the team to two district title games, and personally helped 13 players continue their playing careers at the collegiate level, while developing and implementing a successful strength and conditioning program.

In late 2009, Villarrial became head coach of the Saint Francis Red Wolves football team. The Red Flash compete in the Presidents' Athletic Conference of NCAA Division III. He had previously served as the offensive coordinator for one season.

== Head coaching record ==
Year	Team	Overall	Conference	Standing	Bowl/playoffs
Saint Francis Red Flash (Northeast Conference) (2010–2025)
2010	Saint Francis	1–10	1–7	9th	
2011	Saint Francis	2–9	1–7	9th	
2012	Saint Francis	5–6	4–4	T–4th	
2013	Saint Francis	5–6	3–3	T–3rd	
2014	Saint Francis	5–6	3–3	4th	
2015	Saint Francis	6–4	4–2	2nd	
2016	Saint Francis	7–5	5–1	T–1st	L NCAA Division I First Round
2017	Saint Francis	5–6	3–3	4th	
2018	Saint Francis	4–7	2–4	T–5th	
2019	Saint Francis	6–6	3–4	T–5th	
2020–21	No team—COVID-19				
2021	Saint Francis	5–6	4–3	T–4th	
2022	Saint Francis	9–3	7–0	1st	L NCAA Division I First Round
2023	Saint Francis	4–6	4–3	T–2nd	
2024	Saint Francis	4–7	2–4	T–5th	
2025	Saint Francis	0–11	0–7	9th	
Saint Francis Red Wolves (Presidents' Athletic Conference) (2026–present)
2026	Saint Francis	0–0	0–0		
Saint Francis:		68–98	46–55		
Total:		68–98			
National championship Conference title Conference division title or championship game berth
