= 2014 Colgate Raiders football team =

American college football season

2014 Colgate Raiders football
- Conference: Patriot League
- Record: 5–7 (3–3 Patriot)
- Head coach: Dan Hunt (1st season)
- Offensive coordinator: Chris Young (1st season)
- Defensive coordinator: Paul Shaffner (2nd season)
- Home stadium: Crown Field at Andy Kerr Stadium

2014 Patriot League football standings
	Conf.			Overall
Team	W		L	W		L
No. 11 Fordham $^	6	–	0	11	–	3
Bucknell	4	–	2	8	–	3
Lafayette	3	–	3	5	–	6
Colgate	3	–	3	5	–	7
Holy Cross	2	–	4	4	–	8
Lehigh	2	–	4	3	–	8
Georgetown	1	–	5	3	–	8
$ – Conference champion; ^ – FCS playoff participant; Rankings from The Sports Network poll

The 2014 Colgate Raiders football team represented Colgate University in the 2014 NCAA Division I FCS football season. They were led by first-year head coach Dan Hunt and played their home games at Crown Field at Andy Kerr Stadium. They were a member of the Patriot League. They finished the season 5–7, 3–3 in Patriot League play to finish in a tie for third place.

== Schedule ==
Date	Time	Opponent	Site	TV	Result	Attendance
August 30	2:00 pm	at Ball State*	Scheumann Stadium; Muncie, IN	ESPN3	L 10–30	9,659
September 13	6:00 pm	at Delaware*	Delaware Stadium; Dover, DE		L 25–28	15,319
September 20	1:00 pm	Cornell*^{†}	Crown Field at Andy Kerr Stadium; Hamilton, NY (rivalry)	TWCSC NY	W 27–12	7,522
September 27	12:00 pm	Georgetown	Crown Field at Andy Kerr Stadium; Hamilton, NY	ASN	W 19–0	4,199
October 4	1:00 pm	Holy Cross	Crown Field at Andy Kerr Stadium; Hamilton, NY	TWCSC NY, PLN	W 20–17	3,720
October 11	1:00 pm	Princeton*	Crown Field at Andy Kerr Stadium; Hamilton, NY	TWCSC NY, PLN	W 31–30	4,402
October 18	12:00 pm	at Yale*	Yale Bowl; New Haven, CT		L 31–45	8,788
October 25	3:30 pm	at No. 25 Albany*	Bob Ford Field; Albany, NY	TWCSC NY	L 17–24	4,952
November 1	1:00 pm	at No. 10 Fordham	Coffey Field; Bronx, NY	PLN	L 13–37	6,622
November 8	1:00 pm	Lafayette	Crown Field at Andy Kerr Stadium; Hamilton, NY	PLN	L 16–19	4,377
November 15	12:30 pm	at Lehigh	Goodman Stadium; Bethlehem, PA		L 27–30	4,736
November 22	1:00 pm	at Bucknell	Christy Mathewson–Memorial Stadium; Lewisburg, PA	PLN	W 21–6	2,077
*Non-conference game; ^{†}Homecoming; Rankings from The Sports Network Poll released prior to the game; All times are in Eastern time
