= 2014 Penn Quakers football team =

American college football season

2014 Penn Quakers football
- Conference: Ivy League
- Record: 2–8 (2–5 Ivy)
- Head coach: Al Bagnoli (23rd season)
- Offensive coordinator: Jon McLaughlin (6th season)
- Defensive coordinator: Ray Priore (17th season)
- Home stadium: Franklin Field

2014 Ivy League football standings
	Conf.			Overall
Team	W		L	W		L
No. 15 Harvard $	7	–	0	10	–	0
Dartmouth	6	–	1	8	–	2
Yale	5	–	2	8	–	2
Princeton	4	–	3	5	–	5
Brown	3	–	4	5	–	5
Penn	2	–	5	2	–	8
Cornell	1	–	6	1	–	9
Columbia	0	–	7	0	–	10
$ – Conference champion; Rankings from The Sports Network Poll

The 2014 Penn Quakers football team represented the University of Pennsylvania in the 2014 NCAA Division I FCS football season. Led by Al Bagnoli, during his twenty-third year as head coach, the team played its home games at Franklin Field, and was a member of the Ivy League.

== Background ==
The team finished the season 2–8 overall 2–5 in Ivy League play to place sixth, and averaged 6,982 fans per game.

On April 22, head coach Bagnoli announced his intentions to retire at the end of the 2014 season. He finished at Penn with a 23-year record of 234–99. However, on February 23, Bagnoli accepted the head coaching position at Ivy League rival Columbia.

== Schedule ==
Date	Time	Opponent	Site	TV	Result	Attendance
September 20	1:00 p.m.	at Jacksonville*	D. B. Milne Field; Jacksonville, FL		L 31–34	2,268
September 27	3:00 p.m.	No. 6 Villanova*	Franklin Field; Philadelphia, PA		L 7–41	12,353
October 4	1:30 p.m.	at Dartmouth	Memorial Stadium; Hanover, NH	FCS	L 13–31	3,288
October 11	1:00 p.m.	at No. 14 Fordham*	Coffey Field; Bronx, NY		L 22–60	3,081
October 18	1:00 p.m.	Columbia	Franklin Field; Philadelphia, PA		W 31–7	8,966
October 25	1:30 p.m.	at Yale	Yale Bowl; New Haven, CT	NBCSN	L 21–43	11,402
November 1	1:00 p.m.	Brown^{†}	Franklin Field; Philadelphia, PA		L 13–21	8,176
November 8	3:30 p.m.	at Princeton	Powers Field at Princeton Stadium; Princeton, NJ (rivalry)	NBCSN	L 17–22	9,486
November 15	1:00 p.m.	No. 17 Harvard	Franklin Field; Philadelphia, PA (rivalry)		L 24–34	5,386
November 22	12:30 p.m.	at Cornell	Schoellkopf Field; Ithaca, NY (rivalry)		W 34–26	3,933
*Non-conference game; ^{†}Homecoming; Rankings from The Sports Network Poll released prior to the game; All times are in Eastern time
