= 2014 Lehigh Mountain Hawks football team =

American college football season

2014 Lehigh Mountain Hawks football
- Conference: Patriot League
- Record: 3–8 (2–4 Patriot)
- Head coach: Andy Coen (9th season)
- Offensive coordinator: Drew Folmar (1st season)
- Defensive coordinator: Joe Bottiglieri (1st season)
- Home stadium: Goodman Stadium

2014 Patriot League football standings
| | Conf. | | | Overall |
| Team | W | | L | W | | L |
|---|---|---|---|---|---|---|
| No. 11 Fordham $^ | 6 | – | 0 | 11 | – | 3 |
| Bucknell | 4 | – | 2 | 8 | – | 3 |
| Lafayette | 3 | – | 3 | 5 | – | 6 |
| Colgate | 3 | – | 3 | 5 | – | 7 |
| Holy Cross | 2 | – | 4 | 4 | – | 8 |
| Lehigh | 2 | – | 4 | 3 | – | 8 |
| Georgetown | 1 | – | 5 | 3 | – | 8 |
$ – Conference champion; ^ – FCS playoff participant; Rankings from The Sports Network poll

The 2014 Lehigh Mountain Hawks football team represented Lehigh University in the 2014 NCAA Division I FCS football season. They were led by ninth-year head coach Andy Coen and played their home games at Goodman Stadium. They were a member of the Patriot League. They finished the season 3–8, 2–4 in Patriot League play to finish in a tie for fifth place.

This year was the 150th meeting of The Rivalry against Lafayette College and was played at Yankee Stadium in The Bronx. Lehigh's marching band, the Marching 97, performed not only during the game, but also the day before around Manhattan to boost spirits.

== Schedule ==
| Date | Time | Opponent | Site | TV | Result | Attendance |
|---|---|---|---|---|---|---|
| September 6 | 3:30 p.m. | James Madison* | Goodman Stadium; Bethlehem, PA | SE2 | L 28–31 | 6,519 |
| September 13 | 12:30 p.m. | at No. 7 New Hampshire* | Cowell Stadium; Durham, NH | ASN | L 27–45 | 9,358 |
| September 20 | 12:00 p.m. | at Yale* | Yale Bowl; New Haven, CT | | L 43–54 | 7,326 |
| September 27 | 12:30 p.m. | Monmouth* | Goodman Stadium; Bethlehem, PA | SE2 | L 21–28 | 5,633 |
| October 11 | 12:30 p.m. | Bucknell | Goodman Stadium; Bethlehem, PA | SE2 | L 24–45 | 4,984 |
| October 18 | 3:00 p.m. | at Cornell* | Schoellkopf Field; Ithaca, NY | | W 31–14 | 14,333 |
| October 25 | 12:30 p.m. | No. 12 Fordham^{†} | Goodman Stadium; Bethlehem, PA | SE2 | L 27–48 | 9,372 |
| November 1 | 12:00 p.m. | at Georgetown | Multi-Sport Field; Washington, DC | | W 27–19 | 1,981 |
| November 8 | 12:30 p.m. | at Holy Cross | Fitton Field; Worcester, MA | PLN | L 20–27 | 6,142 |
| November 15 | 12:30 p.m. | Colgate | Goodman Stadium; Bethlehem, PA | SE2 | W 30–27 | 4,736 |
| November 22 | 3:30 p.m. | vs. Lafayette | Yankee Stadium; Bronx, NY (The Rivalry) | CBSSN | L 7–27 | 48,256 |
*Non-conference game; ^{†}Homecoming; Rankings from The Sports Network Poll released prior to the game; All times are in Eastern time
