= Henry Anderson (American football) =

American football player (born 1991)

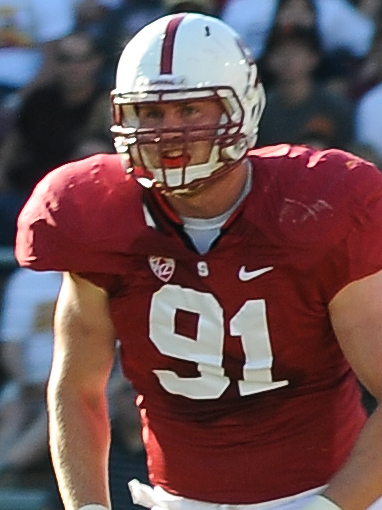
- Anderson with Stanford in 2012

No. 96, 94
- Position: Nose tackle

Personal information
- Born: August 3, 1991 (age 35); Atlanta, Georgia, U.S.
- Listed height: 6 ft 6 in (1.98 m)
- Listed weight: 301 lb (137 kg)

Career information
- High school: Woodward Academy (College Park, Georgia)
- College: Stanford (2010–2014)
- NFL draft: 2015: 3rd round, 93rd overall pick

Career history
- Indianapolis Colts (2015–2017); New York Jets (2018–2020); New England Patriots (2021); Carolina Panthers (2022–2023)

Awards and highlights
- First-team All-Pac-12 (2014); Second-team All-Pac-12 (2012)

Career NFL statistics as of 2023
- Total tackles: 188
- Sacks: 11.5
- Forced fumbles: 1
- Fumble recoveries: 1
- Pass deflections: 8
- Stats at Pro Football Reference

Henry Wyatt Anderson (born August 3, 1991) is an American former professional football player who played nose tackle in the National Football League (NFL). He played college football for the Stanford Cardinal, and was selected by the Indianapolis Colts in the third round of the 2015 NFL draft. He also played in the NFL with the New York Jets, New England Patriots, and Carolina Panthers.

== Early life ==
Anderson attended Woodward Academy in College Park, Georgia. He played football there under head coach Mark Miller, and he had 183 tackles and 20.5 sacks during his career. He totalled 81 tackles (14 for loss), 9.5 sacks, two fumble recoveries and six pass breakups in 2009, leading Woodward Region 4AAA runner-up finish. He was named first-team All-state in 2009 by the Atlanta Journal-Constitution, was a three-time South Fulton Neighbor All-South Metro and a two-time All-4AAA Region pick. He played in the 2010 Offense-Defense All-American Bowl. He was rated as a three-star recruit by Rivals.com and was ranked as the nation’s 27th-best defensive end prospect in his class by Rivals, 42nd according to Scout.com. He committed to Stanford University to play college football.

Anderson also lettered in basketball and track & field. He won the state championship and broke the school record in the shot put with a throw of 17.44 meters (57–2). He also recorded a top-throw of 43.88 meters (143–9) in the discus and was a member of the 400m relay squad.

== College career ==
Anderson played at Stanford from 2010 to 2014. After redshirting his first year, he played in 13 games in 2011. He recorded six tackles and had a 37-yard fumble recovery. In 2012, Anderson started all 14 games and had 50 tackles and 5.5 sacks. In 2013, he played in eight games, missing six due to a knee injury. He finished the year with 19 tackles and three sacks. As a senior in 2014, he played in all 13 games and had 65 tackles and 8.5 sacks.

== Professional career ==
Pre-draft measurables
Height	Weight	Arm length	Hand span	40-yard dash	10-yard split	20-yard split	20-yard shuttle	Three-cone drill	Vertical jump	Broad jump	Bench press
6 ft 6 1/4 in (1.99 m)	294 lb (133 kg)	33 1/2 in (0.85 m)	9 3/4 in (0.25 m)	4.97 s	1.74 s	2.90 s	4.19 s	7.20 s	30.0 in (0.76 m)	9 ft 3 in (2.82 m)	23 reps
All values from NFL Combine and Pro Day

=== Indianapolis Colts ===
Anderson was selected by the Indianapolis Colts in the third round with the 93rd overall pick in the 2015 NFL draft. On November 8, during a 27–24 win over the then-undefeated Denver Broncos, Anderson suffered a knee injury and did not return to the game. The following day, he was placed on injured reserve, ending his 2015 season.

On November 9, 2017, Anderson was placed on injured reserve with a laryngeal fracture.

=== New York Jets ===
On April 28, 2018, Anderson was traded to the New York Jets in exchange for a seventh round pick previously traded from the Seattle Seahawks in the 2018 NFL draft. The traded pick was used to select Zaire Franklin. He played in all 16 games with three starts, recording a career-high 35 combined tackles, seven sacks, and four passes defensed.

On March 12, 2019, Anderson signed a three-year, $25.2 million contract extension with the Jets.

Anderson has been accused of taking cheap shots at players throughout his time in the NFL. He was most notably called out by Buffalo Bills head coach Sean McDermott in December 2018 for a blind-side hit on Stephen Hauschka, and was again in the news for his late hit on Bills quarterback Josh Allen after Week 1 of the 2019 season. On September 14, 2019, he was fined $10,527 by the league office for his late hit on Allen.

On March 2, 2021, Anderson was released by the Jets.

=== New England Patriots ===
On March 19, 2021, Anderson signed a two-year contract with the New England Patriots. He suffered a torn pec in Week 4 and was placed on injured reserve on October 6, 2021.

On August 30, 2022, Anderson was placed on injured reserve, and released two days later.

=== Carolina Panthers ===
On September 5, 2022, Anderson signed with the Carolina Panthers. He was placed on the reserve/non-football illness list on October 25. He was activated on December 10.

Anderson re-signed with the Panthers on March 21, 2023. On August 29, he was placed on injured reserve.

On December 10, 2024, Anderson announced his retirement from professional football.

== NFL career statistics ==
Legend
**Bold**	Career high

Year	Team	Games		Tackles					Interceptions					Fumbles			
Year	Team	GP	GS	Cmb	Solo	Ast	Sck	TFL	Int	Yds	TD	Lng	PD	FF	FR	Yds	TD
2015	IND	9	9	31	19	12	1.0	5	0	0	0	0	2	0	0	0	0
2016	IND	11	2	12	9	3	0.0	0	0	0	0	0	2	0	**1**	0	0
2017	IND	9	8	22	15	7	2.0	4	0	0	0	0	0	**1**	0	0	0
2018	NYJ	**16**	3	35	**22**	13	**7.0**	**7**	0	0	0	0	**4**	0	0	0	0
2019	NYJ	13	**13**	25	14	11	1.0	3	0	0	0	0	0	0	0	0	0
2020	NYJ	**16**	8	**42**	19	**23**	0.5	4	0	0	0	0	0	0	0	0	0
2021	NWE	4	0	3	3	0	0.0	0	0	0	0	0	0	0	0	0	0
2022	CAR	11	0	18	9	9	0.0	3	0	0	0	0	0	0	0	0	0
Career		89	43	188	110	78	11.5	26	0	0	0	0	8	1	1	0	0
