= 2014 Sacred Heart Pioneers football team =

American college football season

2014 Sacred Heart Pioneers football

NEC co-champion

NCAA Division I First Round, L 22–44 at Fordham
- Conference: Northeast Conference

Ranking
- FCS Coaches: No. 22
- Record: 9–3 (5–1 NEC)
- Head coach: Mark Nofri (3rd season)
- Offensive coordinator: Kevin Bolis (4th season)
- Defensive coordinator: Dave Wissman (4th season)
- Home stadium: Campus Field

2014 Northeast Conference football standings
	Conf.			Overall
Team	W		L	W		L
Sacred Heart +^	5	–	1	9	–	3
Wagner +	5	–	1	7	–	4
Bryant	4	–	2	8	–	3
Saint Francis (PA) *	3	–	3	5	–	6
Duquesne	2	–	4	6	–	6
Central Connecticut	1	–	5	3	–	9
Robert Morris	1	–	5	1	–	10
+ – Conference co-champions; ^ – FCS playoff participant; * – Saint Francis (PA) ineligible for FCS playoffs due to APR violation

The 2014 Sacred Heart Pioneers football team represented Sacred Heart University as a member of the Northeast Conference (NEC) during the 2014 NCAA Division I FCS football season. Led by third-year head coach Mark Nofri, the Pioneers compiled an overall record of 9–3 with a mark of 5–1 in conference play, sharing the NEC title with Wagner. Due to a head-to-head win the Wagner, Sacred Heart earned the conference's automatic bid to the NCAA Division I Football Championship playoffs. The Pioneers lost in the first round to Fordham. The team played home games at Campus Field in Fairfield, Connecticut.

== Schedule ==
Date	Time	Opponent	Rank	Site	TV	Result	Attendance
August 30	6:00 p.m.	Marist*		Campus Field; Fairfield, CT	NECFR	W 28–7	3,500
September 6	7:00 p.m.	Lafayette*		Campus Field; Fairfield, CT		W 27–14	1,990
September 14	6:00 p.m.	Assumption*		Campus Field; Fairfield, CT	NECFR	W 44–14	1,427
September 20	1:00 p.m.	Bucknell*^{†}		Campus Field; Fairfield, CT	NECFR	L 20–36	3,471
October 4	3:30 p.m.	at No. 24 Delaware*		Delaware Stadium; Newark, DE		W 10–7	14,894
October 11	12:00 p.m.	Robert Morris		Campus Field; Fairfield, CT	NECFR	W 52–13	654
October 18	12:00 p.m.	at Duquesne		Arthur J. Rooney Athletic Field; Pittsburgh, PA		W 23–20	1,345
October 25	1:00 p.m.	Saint Francis (PA)	No. 24	Campus Field; Fairfield, CT	ESPN3	L 27–30	4,601
November 1	3:30 p.m.	at Wagner		Wagner College Stadium; Staten Island, NY	ESPN3	W 23–7	2,436
November 8	1:00 p.m.	at Central Connecticut		Arute Field; New Britain, CT	NECFR	W 35–27	2,511
November 15	12:00 p.m.	No. 21 Bryant		Campus Field; Fairfield, CT	ESPN3	W 14–7	2,605
November 29	12:00 p.m.	at No. 9 Fordham*		Coffey Field; Bronx, NY	ESPN3	L 22–44	2,442
*Non-conference game; ^{†}Homecoming; Rankings from The Sports Network Poll released prior to the game; All times are in Eastern time
