= 2014 Lafayette Leopards football team =

American college football season

2014 Lafayette Leopards football
- Conference: Patriot League
- Record: 5–6 (3–3 Patriot)
- Head coach: Frank Tavani (15th season)
- Offensive coordinator: Mickey Fein (6th season)
- Defensive coordinator: Art Link (1st season)
- Home stadium: Fisher Stadium

2014 Patriot League football standings
	Conf.			Overall
Team	W		L	W		L
No. 11 Fordham $^	6	–	0	11	–	3
Bucknell	4	–	2	8	–	3
Lafayette	3	–	3	5	–	6
Colgate	3	–	3	5	–	7
Holy Cross	2	–	4	4	–	8
Lehigh	2	–	4	3	–	8
Georgetown	1	–	5	3	–	8
$ – Conference champion; ^ – FCS playoff participant; Rankings from The Sports Network poll

The 2014 Lafayette Leopards football team represented Lafayette College as member of the Patriot League during the 2014 NCAA Division I FCS football season. Led by 15th-year head coach Frank Tavani, the Leopards compiled an overall record of 5–6 with a mark of 3–3 in conference play, tying for third place in the Patriot League. Lafayette played home games at Fisher Field in Easton, Pennsylvania.

== Schedule ==
Date	Time	Opponent	Site	TV	Result	Attendance
September 6	6:00 pm	at Sacred Heart*	Campus Field; Fairfield, CT	LSN	L 14–27	1,990
September 13	6:00 pm	Robert Morris*	Fisher Stadium; Easton, PA	LSN	W 50–3	3,207
September 20	7:00 pm	at No. 13 William & Mary*	Zable Stadium; Williamsburg, VA		L 19–33	9,137
September 27	6:00 pm	Wagner*	Fisher Stadium; Easton, PA	LSN	W 35–23	8,756
October 3	6:30 pm	at No. 16 Fordham	Coffey Field; Bronx, NY	CBSSN	L 18–42	4,376
October 11	3:30 pm	Georgetown	Fisher Stadium; Easton, PA	LSN	W 24–21	3,361
October 18	1:00 pm	at No. 25 Harvard*	Harvard Stadium; Boston, MA	LSN	L 14–24	7,177
October 25	3:30 pm	Holy Cross^{†}	Fisher Stadium; Easton, PA	LSN	L 14–24	8,892
November 1	1:00 pm	at Bucknell	Christy Mathewson–Memorial Stadium; Lewisburg, PA	LSN	L 24–27 ^{OT}	3,056
November 8	1:00 pm	at Colgate	Crown Field at Andy Kerr Stadium; Hamilton, NY	PLN	W 19–16	4,377
November 22	3:30 pm	vs. Lehigh	Yankee Stadium; Bronx, NY (The Rivalry)	CBSSN	W 27–7	48,256
*Non-conference game; ^{†}Homecoming; Rankings from The Sports Network Poll released prior to the game; All times are in Eastern time
