= 2014 Wagner Seahawks football team =

American college football season

2014 Wagner Seahawks football
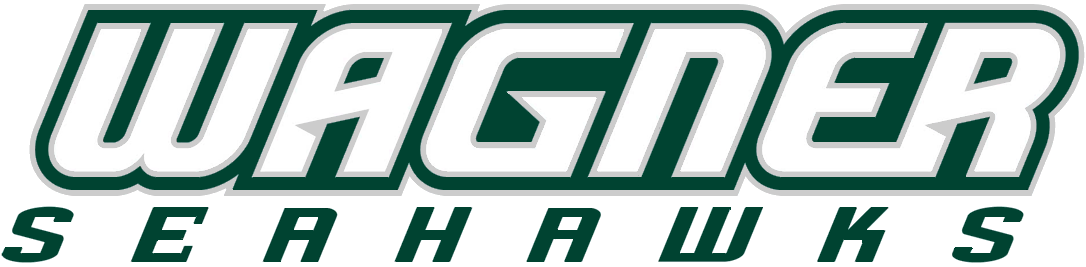

NEC co-champion
- Conference: Northeast Conference
- Record: 7–4 (5–1 NEC)
- Head coach: Walt Hameline (34th season)
- Offensive coordinator: Jason Houghtaling (2nd season)
- Defensive coordinator: Malik Hall (3rd season)
- Home stadium: Wagner College Stadium

2014 Northeast Conference football standings
	Conf.			Overall
Team	W		L	W		L
Sacred Heart +^	5	–	1	9	–	3
Wagner +	5	–	1	7	–	4
Bryant	4	–	2	8	–	3
Saint Francis (PA) *	3	–	3	5	–	6
Duquesne	2	–	4	6	–	6
Central Connecticut	1	–	5	3	–	9
Robert Morris	1	–	5	1	–	10
+ – Conference co-champions; ^ – FCS playoff participant; * – Saint Francis (PA) ineligible for FCS playoffs due to APR violation

The 2014 Wagner Seahawks football team represented Wagner College in the 2014 NCAA Division I FCS football season as a member of the Northeast Conference (NEC). They were led by 34th-year head coach Walt Hameline and played their home games at Wagner College Stadium. Wagner finished the season 7–4 overall and 5–1 in NEC play to share the conference championship with Sacred Heart. Despite the share of the conference title, they did not receive the NEC's automatic bid to the FCS Playoffs and did not receive an at-large bid.

On November 24, Hamline retired. He finished at Wagner with a 34-year record of 223–139–2.

== Schedule ==
Date	Time	Opponent	Site	TV	Result	Attendance
August 30	Noon	at Georgetown*	Multi-Sport Field; Washington, DC		W 21–3	1,981
September 6	6:00 p.m.	at FIU*	FIU Stadium; Miami, FL		L 3–34	9,981
September 13	1:00 p.m.	at Monmouth*	Kessler Field; West Long Branch, NJ		L 16–21	2,421
September 27	6:00 p.m.	at Lafayette*	Fisher Stadium; Easton, PA		L 23–35	8,756
October 4	6:00 p.m.	Alderson Broaddus*	Wagner College Stadium; Staten Island, NY	NECFR	W 26–0	2,808
October 11	Noon	Saint Francis (PA)	Wagner College Stadium; Staten Island, NY	NECFR	W 46–39 ^{OT}	1,735
October 25	1:00 p.m.	at Central Connecticut	Arute Field; New Britain, CT	NECFR	W 20–10	2,031
November 1	3:30 p.m.	Sacred Heart^{†}	Wagner College Stadium; Staten Island, NY	ESPN3	L 7–23	2,436
November 8	Noon	at Robert Morris	Joe Walton Stadium; Moon Township, PA	ESPN3	W 20–0	1,192
November 15	Noon	Duquesne	Wagner College Stadium; Staten Island, NY	NECFR	W 23–13	2,132
November 22	1:00 p.m.	at Bryant	Bulldog Stadium; Smithfield, RI	NECFR	W 23–20	1,893
*Non-conference game; ^{†}Homecoming; All times are in Eastern time
