= 2014 Robert Morris Colonials football team =

American college football season

2014 Robert Morris Colonials football
- Conference: Northeast Conference
- Record: 1–10 (1–5 NEC)
- Head coach: John Banaszak (1st season)
- Offensive coordinator: Darrin Hicks (1st season)
- Defensive coordinator: Scott Farison (7th season)
- Home stadium: Joe Walton Stadium

2014 Northeast Conference football standings
	Conf.			Overall
Team	W		L	W		L
Sacred Heart +^	5	–	1	9	–	3
Wagner +	5	–	1	7	–	4
Bryant	4	–	2	8	–	3
Saint Francis (PA) *	3	–	3	5	–	6
Duquesne	2	–	4	6	–	6
Central Connecticut	1	–	5	3	–	9
Robert Morris	1	–	5	1	–	10
+ – Conference co-champions; ^ – FCS playoff participant; * – Saint Francis (PA) ineligible for FCS playoffs due to APR violation

The 2014 Robert Morris Colonials football team represented Robert Morris University in the 2014 NCAA Division I FCS football season. They were led by first-year head coach John Banaszak and played their home games at Joe Walton Stadium. They were a member of the Northeast Conference. They finished the season 1–10, 1–5 in NEC play to finish in sixth place.

Banaszak took over as head coach following the retirement of Joe Walton the previous season.

== Schedule ==
Date	Time	Opponent	Site	TV	Result	Attendance
August 28	7:00 p.m.	Eastern Kentucky*	Joe Walton Stadium; Moon Township, PA		L 10–29	2,809
September 6	7:00 p.m.	at North Dakota*	Alerus Center; Grand Forks, ND		L 13–16	9,118
September 13	6:00 p.m.	at Lafayette*	Fisher Stadium; Easton, PA		L 3–50	3,207
September 20	1:00 p.m.	at Dayton*	Welcome Stadium; Dayton, OH		L 7–31	5,839
October 4	3:00 p.m.	Monmouth^{†}	Joe Walton Stadium; Moon Township, PA	NECFR	L 20–51	2,056
October 11	12:00 p.m.	at Sacred Heart	Campus Field; Fairfield, CT	NECFR	L 13–52	654
October 18	12:00 p.m.	Central Connecticut	Joe Walton Stadium; Moon Township, PA	NECFR	W 27–24	1,034
October 25	1:00 p.m.	at Bryant	Bulldog Stadium; Smithfield, RI	NECFR	L 9–42	4,890
November 8	12:00 p.m.	Wagner	Joe Walton Stadium; Moon Township, PA	ESPN3	L 0–20	1,192
November 15	12:00 p.m.	Saint Francis (PA)	Joe Walton Stadium; Moon Township, PA	NECFR	L 7–40	1,046
November 22	12:00 p.m.	at Duquesne	Arthur J. Rooney Athletic Field; Pittsburgh, PA	ESPN3	L 0–22	1,085
*Non-conference game; ^{†}Homecoming; All times are in Eastern time
