= 2014 Saint Francis Red Flash football team =

American college football season

2014 Saint Francis Red Flash football
- Conference: Northeast Conference
- Record: 5–6 (3–3 NEC)
- Head coach: Chris Villarrial (5th season)
- Offensive coordinator: Eric Long
- Defensive coordinator: Michael Craig
- Home stadium: DeGol Field

2014 Northeast Conference football standings
	Conf.			Overall
Team	W		L	W		L
Sacred Heart +^	5	–	1	9	–	3
Wagner +	5	–	1	7	–	4
Bryant	4	–	2	8	–	3
Saint Francis (PA) *	3	–	3	5	–	6
Duquesne	2	–	4	6	–	6
Central Connecticut	1	–	5	3	–	9
Robert Morris	1	–	5	1	–	10
+ – Conference co-champions; ^ – FCS playoff participant; * – Saint Francis (PA) ineligible for FCS playoffs due to APR violation

The 2014 Saint Francis Red Flash football team represented Saint Francis University in the 2014 NCAA Division I FCS football season. They were led by fifth year head coach Chris Villarrial and played their home games at DeGol Field. They were a member of the Northeast Conference. They finished the season 16–16, 9–9 in NEC play to finish in fifth place.

== Schedule ==
Date	Time	Opponent	Site	TV	Result	Attendance
August 30	6:00 p.m.	at No. 11 Fordham*	Coffey Field; Bronx, NY		L 23–52	3,462
September 6	1:00 p.m.	Clarion*	DeGol Field; Loretto, PA	NECFR	W 27–13	1,715
September 13	4:00 p.m.	at James Madison*	Bridgeforth Stadium; Harrisonburg, VA		L 22–38	23,577
September 20	7:00 p.m.	at No. 19 Youngstown State*	Stambaugh Stadium; Youngstown, OH		L 23–52	16,378
September 27	4:00 p.m.	Virginia–Lynchburg	DeGol Field; Loretto, PA	NECFR	W 80–0	1,147
October 11	12:00 p.m.	at Wagner	Wagner College Stadium; Staten Island, NY	NECFR	L 39–46 ^{OT}	1,735
October 18	12:00 p.m.	Bryant	DeGol Field; Loretto, PA	NECFR	L 27–42	1,064
October 25	1:00 p.m.	at No. 24 Sacred Heart	Campus Field; Fairfield, CT	ESPN3	W 30–27	4,601
November 1	1:00 p.m.	Duquesne^{†}	DeGol Field; Loretto, PA	NECFR	W 26–16	1,428
November 15	12:00 p.m.	Robert Morris	Joe Walton Stadium; Moon Township, PA	NECFR	W 40–7	1,046
November 22	12:00 p.m.	Central Connecticut	DeGol Field; Loretto, PA	NECFR	L 17–22	1,011
*Non-conference game; ^{†}Homecoming; Rankings from The Sports Network Poll released prior to the game; All times are in Eastern time
