= 2014 Central Connecticut Blue Devils football team =

American college football season

2014 Central Connecticut Blue Devils football
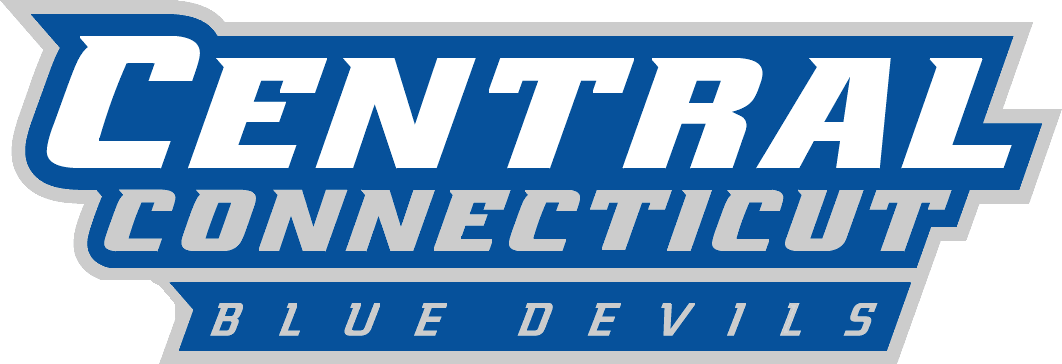
- Conference: Northeast Conference
- Record: 3–9 (1–5 NEC)
- Head coach: Pete Rossomando (1st season)
- Defensive coordinator: Andrew Christ
- Home stadium: Arute Field

2014 Northeast Conference football standings
	Conf.			Overall
Team	W		L	W		L
Sacred Heart +^	5	–	1	9	–	3
Wagner +	5	–	1	7	–	4
Bryant	4	–	2	8	–	3
Saint Francis (PA) *	3	–	3	5	–	6
Duquesne	2	–	4	6	–	6
Central Connecticut	1	–	5	3	–	9
Robert Morris	1	–	5	1	–	10
+ – Conference co-champions; ^ – FCS playoff participant; * – Saint Francis (PA) ineligible for FCS playoffs due to APR violation

The 2014 Central Connecticut Blue Devils football team represented Central Connecticut State University in the 2014 NCAA Division I FCS football season. They were led by first year head coach Pete Rossomando and played their home games at Arute Field. They were a member of the Northeast Conference. They finished the season 3–9, 1–5 in NEC play to finish in a tie for sixth place.

== Schedule ==
Date	Time	Opponent	Site	TV	Result	Attendance
August 30	6:00 p.m.	at No. 13 Towson*	Johnny Unitas Stadium; Towson, MD		W 31–27	8,058
September 6	6:00 p.m.	Albany*	Arute Field; New Britain, CT	NECFR	L 0–19	4,150
September 13	1:00 p.m.	at Holy Cross*	Fitton Field; Worcester, MA		L 7–20	6,379
September 20	7:00 p.m.	at Dartmouth*	Memorial Stadium; Hanover, NH		L 25–35	7,234
September 27	4:00 p.m.	Rhode Island*	Arute Field; New Britain, CT	NECFR	W 38–14	4,022
October 11	1:00 p.m.	Duquesne^{†}	Arute Field; New Britain, CT	ESPN3	L 20–28	2,239
October 18	12:00 p.m.	at Robert Morris	Joe Walton Stadium; Moon Township, PA	NECFR	L 24–27	1034
October 25	1:00 p.m.	Wagner	Arute Field; New Britain, CT	NECFR	L 10–20	2,031
November 1	12:00 p.m.	at No. 25 Bryant	Bulldog Stadium; Smithfield, RI	ESPN3	L 3–31	964
November 8	1:00 p.m.	Sacred Heart	Arute Field; New Britain, CT	NECFR	L 27–35	2,511
November 15	1:00 p.m.	Howard*	Arute Field; New Britain, CT	NECFR	L 25–28	3,517
November 22	12:00 p.m.	at Saint Francis (PA)	DeGol Field; Loretto, PA	NECFR	W 22–17	1,011
*Non-conference game; ^{†}Homecoming; Rankings from The Sports Network Poll released prior to the game; All times are in Eastern time
