= 2014 Bryant Bulldogs football team =

American college football season

2014 Bryant Bulldogs football
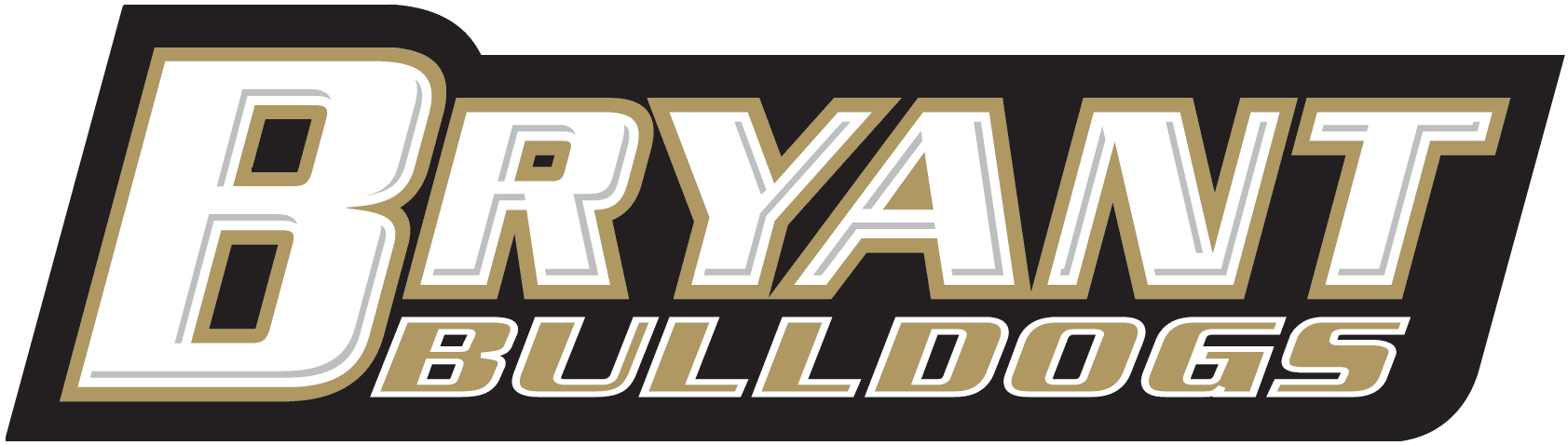
- Conference: Northeast Conference
- Record: 8–3 (4–2 NEC)
- Head coach: Marty Fine (11th season)
- Defensive coordinator: Greg Gigantino (8th season)
- Home stadium: Bulldog Stadium

2014 Northeast Conference football standings
	Conf.			Overall
Team	W		L	W		L
Sacred Heart +^	5	–	1	9	–	3
Wagner +	5	–	1	7	–	4
Bryant	4	–	2	8	–	3
Saint Francis (PA) *	3	–	3	5	–	6
Duquesne	2	–	4	6	–	6
Central Connecticut	1	–	5	3	–	9
Robert Morris	1	–	5	1	–	10
+ – Conference co-champions; ^ – FCS playoff participant; * – Saint Francis (PA) ineligible for FCS playoffs due to APR violation

The 2014 Bryant Bulldogs football team represented Bryant University as a member of the Northeast Conference (NEC) during the 2014 NCAA Division I FCS football season. Led by 11th-year head coach Marty Fine, the Bulldogs compiled an overall record of 8–3 with a mark of 4–2 in conference play, placing third in the NEC. Bryant played home games at Bulldog Stadium in Smithfield, Rhode Island.

== Schedule ==
Date	Time	Opponent	Rank	Site	TV	Result	Attendance
August 28	7:00 p.m.	at Stony Brook*		Kenneth P. LaValle Stadium; Stony Brook, NY	Cox RI	W 13–7	10,252
September 6	1:00 p.m.	Merrimack*		Bulldog Stadium; Smithfield, RI	NECFR	W 40–14	2,413
September 13	1:00 p.m.	No. 23 Maine*^{†}		Bulldog Stadium; Smithfield, RI	NECFR	W 13–10	3,291
September 20	7:00 p.m.	at No. 24 Liberty*		Williams Stadium; Lynchburg, VA	ESPN3	L 21–38	16,873
October 4	1:00 p.m.	Bucknell		Bulldog Stadium; Smithfield, RI	NECFR	W 34–15	2,107
October 18	12:00 p.m.	at Saint Francis (PA)		DeGol Field; Loretto, PA	NECFR	W 42–27	1,064
October 25	1:00 p.m.	Robert Morris		Bulldog Stadium; Smithfield, RI	NECFR	W 42–9	4,890
November 1	12:00 p.m.	Central Connecticut	No. 25	Bulldog Stadium; Smithfield, RI	ESPN3	W 31–3	964
November 8	12:00 p.m.	at Duquesne	No. 23	Arthur J. Rooney Athletic Field; Pittsburgh, PA	NECFR	W 20–17	1,034
November 15	12:00 p.m.	at Sacred Heart	No. 21	Campus Field; Fairfield, CT	ESPN3	L 7–14	2,605
November 22	12:00 p.m.	Wagner		Bulldog Stadium; Smithfield, RI	NECFR	L 20–23	1,893
*Non-conference game; ^{†}Homecoming; Rankings from The Sports Network Poll released prior to the game; All times are in Eastern time

== Ranking movements ==
Ranking movements Legend: ██ Increase in ranking ██ Decrease in ranking — = Not ranked RV = Received votes т = Tied with team above or below
	Week														
Poll	Pre	1	2	3	4	5	6	7	8	9	10	11	12	13	Final
Sports Network	—	RV	RV	RV	RV	RV	RV	RV	RV	25	23	21	RV	RV	
Coaches	—	RV	RV	T25	RV	—	RV	RV	25	24	21	21	RV	—	
