= 2014 Duquesne Dukes football team =

American college football season

2014 Duquesne Dukes football
- Conference: Northeast Conference
- Record: 6–6 (2–4 NEC)
- Head coach: Jerry Schmitt (10th season)
- Offensive coordinator: Gary Dunn (6th season)
- Defensive coordinator: Dave Opfar (5th season)
- Home stadium: Arthur J. Rooney Field

2014 Northeast Conference football standings
	Conf.			Overall
Team	W		L	W		L
Sacred Heart +^	5	–	1	9	–	3
Wagner +	5	–	1	7	–	4
Bryant	4	–	2	8	–	3
Saint Francis (PA) *	3	–	3	5	–	6
Duquesne	2	–	4	6	–	6
Central Connecticut	1	–	5	3	–	9
Robert Morris	1	–	5	1	–	10
+ – Conference co-champions; ^ – FCS playoff participant; * – Saint Francis (PA) ineligible for FCS playoffs due to APR violation

The 2014 Duquesne Dukes football team represented Duquesne University as a member of the Northeast Conference (NEC) during the 2014 NCAA Division I FCS football season. Led by tenth-year head coach Jerry Schmitt, the Dukes compiled an overall record of 6–6 with a mark of 2–4 in conference play, placing fifth in the NEC. Duquesne played home games at Arthur J. Rooney Athletic Field in Pittsburgh.

== Schedule ==
Date	Time	Opponent	Site	TV	Result	Attendance
August 30	3:30 pm	at Buffalo*	University at Buffalo Stadium; Amherst, NY	ESPN3	L 28–38	20,329
September 6	4:00 pm	at Youngstown State*	Stambaugh Stadium; Youngstown, OH		L 23–34	10,525
September 13	12:00 pm	Dayton*	Arthur J. Rooney Athletic Field; Pittsburgh, PA		W 33–13	2,163
September 20	12:00 pm	Monmouth*	Arthur J. Rooney Athletic Field; Pittsburgh, PA		W 30–21	1,287
October 4	1:00 pm	West Liberty*^{†}	Arthur J. Rooney Athletic Field; Pittsburgh, PA		W 39–13	1,719
October 11	1:00 pm	at Central Connecticut	Arute Field; New Britain, CT	ESPN3	W 28–20	2,239
October 18	12:00 pm	Sacred Heart	Arthur J. Rooney Athletic Field; Pittsburgh, PA		L 20–23	1,345
October 25	12:00 pm	Alderson Broaddus*	Arthur J. Rooney Athletic Field; Pittsburgh, PA		W 48–27	1,025
November 1	1:00 pm	at Saint Francis (PA)	DeGol Field; Loretto, PA		L 16–26	1,428
November 8	12:00 pm	No. 23 Bryant	Arthur J. Rooney Athletic Field; Pittsburgh, PA		L 17–20	1,034
November 15	12:00 pm	at Wagner	Wagner College Stadium; State Island, NY	NECFR	L 13–23	2,132
November 22	12:00 pm	Robert Morris	Arthur J. Rooney Athletic Field; Pittsburgh, PA	ESPN3	W 22–0	1,085
*Non-conference game; ^{†}Homecoming; Rankings from The Sports Network Poll released prior to the game; All times are in Eastern time
