= 2014 Cornell Big Red football team =

American college football season

2014 Cornell Big Red football
- Conference: Ivy League
- Record: 1–9 (1–6 Ivy)
- Head coach: David Archer (2nd season)
- Offensive coordinator: Roy Istvan (1st season)
- Defensive coordinator: Jared Backus (2nd season)
- Captains: Justin Harris; Rush Imhotep; Lucas Shapiro
- Home stadium: Schoellkopf Field

2014 Ivy League football standings
	Conf.			Overall
Team	W		L	W		L
No. 15 Harvard $	7	–	0	10	–	0
Dartmouth	6	–	1	8	–	2
Yale	5	–	2	8	–	2
Princeton	4	–	3	5	–	5
Brown	3	–	4	5	–	5
Penn	2	–	5	2	–	8
Cornell	1	–	6	1	–	9
Columbia	0	–	7	0	–	10
$ – Conference champion; Rankings from The Sports Network Poll

The 2014 Cornell Big Red football team represented Cornell University in the 2014 NCAA Division I FCS football season as a member of the Ivy League. They were led by second-year head coach David Archer and played their home games at Schoellkopf Field. Cornell finished the season 1–9 overall and 1–6 in Ivy League play to place seventh. Cornell averaged 6,646 fans per game.

== Schedule ==
Date	Time	Opponent	Site	TV	Result	Attendance
September 20	1:00 p.m.	at Colgate*	Crown Field at Andy Kerr Stadium; Hamilton, NY (rivalry)	TWCS NY	L 12–27	7,522
September 27	6:00 p.m.	at Bucknell*	Christy Mathewson–Memorial Stadium; Lewisburg, PA		L 7–20	5,578
October 4	12:30 p.m.	Yale	Schoellkopf Field; Ithaca, NY		L 13–51	5,442
October 11	1:00 p.m.	at Harvard	Harvard Stadium; Boston, MA	FCS	L 7–24	9,165
October 18	3:00 p.m.	Lehigh*^{†}	Schoellkopf Field; Ithaca, NY		L 14–31	14,333
October 25	12:30 p.m.	at Brown	Brown Stadium; Providence, RI		L 16–42	6,880
November 1	12:30 p.m.	Princeton	Schoellkopf Field; Ithaca, NY	FCS	L 27–38	5,313
November 8	12:30 p.m.	Dartmouth	Schoellkopf Field; Ithaca, NY (rivalry)		L 7–42	4,212
November 15	12:30 p.m.	at Columbia	Wien Stadium; New York, NY (rivalry)	FCS	W 30–27	5,734
November 22	12:30 p.m.	Penn	Schoellkopf Field; Ithaca, NY (rivalry)		L 26–34	3,933
*Non-conference game; ^{†}Homecoming; All times are in Eastern time
