= 2014 Harvard Crimson football team =

American college football season

2014 Harvard Crimson football

Ivy League champion
- Conference: Ivy League

Ranking
- Sports Network: No. 15
- FCS Coaches: No. 15
- Record: 10–0 (7–0 Ivy)
- Head coach: Tim Murphy (21st season)
- Offensive coordinator: Joel Lamb (9th season)
- Offensive scheme: Spread
- Defensive coordinator: Scott Larkee (6th season)
- Base defense: 4–3
- Home stadium: Harvard Stadium

2014 Ivy League football standings
	Conf.			Overall
Team	W		L	W		L
No. 15 Harvard $	7	–	0	10	–	0
Dartmouth	6	–	1	8	–	2
Yale	5	–	2	8	–	2
Princeton	4	–	3	5	–	5
Brown	3	–	4	5	–	5
Penn	2	–	5	2	–	8
Cornell	1	–	6	1	–	9
Columbia	0	–	7	0	–	10
$ – Conference champion; Rankings from The Sports Network Poll

The 2014 Harvard Crimson football team represented Harvard University in the 2014 NCAA Division I FCS football season. They were led by 21st-year head coach Tim Murphy and played their home games at Harvard Stadium. They were a member of the Ivy League. They finished the season 10–0 overall 7–0 in Ivy League play to be crowned Ivy League champions. Harvard averaged 15,017 fans per game.

== Schedule ==
Date	Time	Opponent	Rank	Site	TV	Result	Attendance
September 19	7:00 p.m.	Holy Cross*		Harvard Stadium; Boston, MA	ESPN3	W 41–18	15,132
September 27	6:00 p.m.	at Brown		Brown Stadium; Providence, RI		W 22–14	13,511
October 4	12:00 p.m.	at Georgetown*		Multi-Sport Field; Washington, DC		W 34–3	2,502
October 11	1:00 p.m.	Cornell		Harvard Stadium; Boston, MA	FCS Atlantic	W 24–7	9,165
October 18	1:00 p.m.	Lafayette*	No. 25	Harvard Stadium; Boston, MA	NESN/ESPN3	W 24–14	7,177
October 25	1:00 p.m.	at Princeton	No. 21	Powers Field at Princeton Stadium; Princeton, NJ (rivalry)	ESPN3	W 49–7	12,164
November 1	3:30 p.m.	at Dartmouth	No. 20	Memorial Stadium; Hanover, NH (rivalry)	CSN	W 23–12	5,833
November 8	1:00 p.m.	Columbia	No. 18	Harvard Stadium; Boston, MA	ESPN3	W 45–0	12,552
November 15	1:00 p.m.	at Penn	No. 17	Franklin Field; Philadelphia, PA (rivalry)		W 34–24	5,386
November 22	12:30 p.m.	Yale	No. 15	Harvard Stadium; Boston, MA (rivalry, College GameDay)	NBCSN	W 31–24	31,062
*Non-conference game; Rankings from The Sports Network Poll released prior to the game; All times are in Eastern time

== Rankings ==
Ranking movements Legend: ██ Increase in ranking ██ Decrease in ranking RV = Received votes
	Week														
Poll	Pre	1	2	3	4	5	6	7	8	9	10	11	12	13	Final
Sports Network	RV	RV	RV	RV	RV	RV	RV	25	21	20	18	17	15	13	15
Coaches	RV	RV	RV	RV	RV	RV	RV	24	21	18	17	17	14	14	15
