= 2014 Yale Bulldogs football team =

American college football season

2014 Yale Bulldogs football
- Conference: Ivy League
- Record: 8–2 (5–2 Ivy)
- Head coach: Tony Reno (3rd season)
- Offensive coordinator: Joe Conlin (1st season)
- Offensive scheme: Spread
- Defensive coordinator: Rick Flanders (3rd season)
- Base defense: 4–3
- Home stadium: Yale Bowl

2014 Ivy League football standings
	Conf.			Overall
Team	W		L	W		L
No. 15 Harvard $	7	–	0	10	–	0
Dartmouth	6	–	1	8	–	2
Yale	5	–	2	8	–	2
Princeton	4	–	3	5	–	5
Brown	3	–	4	5	–	5
Penn	2	–	5	2	–	8
Cornell	1	–	6	1	–	9
Columbia	0	–	7	0	–	10
$ – Conference champion; Rankings from The Sports Network Poll

The 2014 Yale Bulldogs football team represented Yale University in the 2014 NCAA Division I FCS football season. They were led by third year head coach Tony Reno and played their home games at the Yale Bowl. They were a member of the Ivy League. They finished the season 8–2 overall and 5–2 in Ivy League play to place third. Yale averaged 15,193 fans per game.

== Schedule ==
Date	Time	Opponent	Site	TV	Result	Attendance
September 20	1:00 p.m.	Lehigh*	Yale Bowl; New Haven, CT		W 54–43	7,326
September 27	1:00 p.m.	Army*	Yale Bowl; New Haven, CT	FCS	W 49–43 ^{OT}	34,142
October 4	12:30 p.m.	at Cornell	Schoellkopf Field; Ithaca, NY		W 51–13	5,442
October 11	1:00 p.m.	Dartmouth	Yale Bowl; New Haven, CT		L 31–38	6,241
October 18	1:00 p.m.	Colgate*	Yale Bowl; New Haven, CT		W 45–31	8,788
October 25	1:30 p.m.	Penn	Yale Bowl; New Haven, CT	NBCSN	W 43–21	11,402
November 1	12:30 p.m.	at Columbia	Wien Stadium; New York, NY		W 25–7	2,808
November 8	12:30 p.m.	at Brown	Brown Stadium; Providence, RI	FCS	W 45–42	4,350
November 15	12:00 p.m.	Princeton	Yale Bowl; New Haven, CT (rivalry)		W 44–30	23,260
November 22	12:30 p.m.	at No. 15 Harvard	Harvard Stadium; Boston, MA (rivalry, College GameDay)	NBCSN	L 24–31	31,062
*Non-conference game; Rankings from The Sports Network Poll released prior to the game; All times are in Eastern time
