= 2017–18 Liberty Lady Flames basketball team =

Intercollegiate basketball season

2017–18 Liberty Lady Flames basketball

Big South Regular Season and Tournament Champions

NCAA Women's Tournament, first round
- Conference: Big South Conference
- Record: 24–10 (16–2 Big South)
- Head coach: Carey Green (19th season)
- Assistant coaches: Alexis Sherard; Andy Bloodworth; Erin Batth
- Home arena: Vines Center

2017–18 Big South women's basketball standings
	Conf.				Overall
Team	W		L	PCT	W		L	PCT
Liberty †	16	–	2	.889	24	–	10	.706
Radford	15	–	3	.833	24	–	9	.727
UNC Asheville	12	–	6	.667	17	–	16	.515
High Point	10	–	8	.556	17	–	14	.548
Presbyterian	9	–	9	.500	12	–	18	.400
Gardner–Webb	8	–	10	.444	19	–	13	.594
Campbell	8	–	10	.444	15	–	15	.500
Charleston Southern	5	–	13	.278	11	–	20	.355
Longwood	5	–	13	.278	7	–	23	.233
Winthrop	2	–	16	.111	3	–	27	.100
† 2018 Big South tournament winner As of March 17, 2018; Rankings from AP poll

The 2017–18 Liberty Lady Flames basketball team represented Liberty University during the 2017–18 NCAA Division I women's basketball season. The Eagles, led by nineteenth-year head coach Carey Green, played their home games at the Vines Center and were members of the Big South Conference. They finished the season 24–10, 16–3 in Big South play to win the Big South regular season title. They won the Big South women's basketball tournament and earned an automatic place in the NCAA women's tournament, where they lost to Tennessee in the first round.

This was Liberty's final season as members of the Big South Conference, as the school announced on May 17, 2018, that they would be moving to the Atlantic Sun Conference for the 2018–19 season.

== Roster ==
2017–18 Liberty Lady Flames women's basketball team
Players
Coaches

Pos.	#	Name	Height	Year	Previous school	Hometown
G	2	Ria Gulley (redshirt)	5 ft 9 in (1.75 m)	So	Tom C. Clark; Indiana	San Antonio, TX
G	3	Nene Johnson	5 ft 8 in (1.73 m)	Sr	Martin County; Eastern Florida State	Stuart, FL
G	4	Tatyana Crowder	5 ft 6 in (1.68 m)	Jr	Liberty Christian Academy	Roanoke, VA
G/F	10	Kierra Johnson-Graham	5 ft 11 in (1.8 m)	So	Tucker	Atlanta, GA
G	11	Brooke Basinger	5 ft 8 in (1.73 m)	Jr	Woodgrove; Christopher Newport	Purcellville, VA
G	12	Ashtyn Baker	5 ft 6 in (1.68 m)	Fr	Northpoint Christian School	Nesbit, MS
G	13	Melis Ucar	5 ft 10 in (1.78 m)	Jr	Bahcelievler Deneme; Iowa Western CC	Ankara, Turkey
G/F	14	Lela Sellers	6 ft 0 in (1.83 m)	So	John F. Kennedy	Lakeville, MN
G	20	Sheana Vega	5 ft 8 in (1.73 m)	Sr	Jackson Memorial	Jackson, NJ
F	21	Keyen Green	6 ft 1 in (1.85 m)	So	Phil-Mont Christian Academy	Philadelphia, PA
G	23	Emily Lytle (redshirt)	5 ft 11 in (1.8 m)	So	Evangelical Christian; Little Rock	Memphis, TN
G	24	Iva Ilic	5 ft 7 in (1.7 m)	So	Fran Galovic	Koprivnica, Croatia
C	25	Apilyn Bonny	6 ft 5 in (1.96 m)	Fr	Grand Street Campus	Bronx, NY
F	30	KK Barbour	6 ft 1 in (1.85 m)	Jr	Albemarle	Charlottesville, VA
F/C	33	Amy West	6 ft 4 in (1.93 m)	Fr	Palmerston North Girls	Palmerston North, New Zealand
G/F	34	Bridgette Rettstatt	6 ft 2 in (1.88 m)	Fr	Worthington Christian	Galena, OH
G/F	35	Ola Makurat	6 ft 2 in (1.88 m)	So	Sport Championship School	Sierakowice, Poland
F/C	40	Molly Reagan	6 ft 4 in (1.93 m)	Jr	Braintree	Braintree, MA

Head coach

- Carey Green (Coastal Carolina)

Assistant coach(es)

- Alexis Sherard (Saint Michael's)
- Andy Bloodworth (Calvin)
- Erin Batth (Clemson)

Legend

- (C) Team captain
- (S) Suspended
- (I) Ineligible
- (W) Walk-on
- Injured
- Current redshirt

Roster
Last update: March 13, 2018

== Schedule ==
Date time, TV	Rank^{#}	Opponent^{#}	Result	Record	Site (attendance) city, state
Non-conference regular season
11/10/2017*; 4:00 pm		at Old Dominion; Preseason WNIT First Round	W 63–55	1–0	Ted Constant Convocation Center (1,584); Norfolk, VA
11/12/2017*; 2:00 pm		at No. 24 Michigan; Preseason WNIT Second Round	L 50–74	1–1	Crisler Center (2,138); Ann Arbor, MI
11/17/2017*; 8:00 pm, ESPN3		at Drake; Preseason WNIT consolation round	L 68–96	1–2	Knapp Center (2,022); Des Moines, IA
11/24/2017*; 2:00 pm		vs. Houston; UMass Thanksgiving Classic	L 68–75	1–3	Mullins Center (387); Amherst, MA
11/25/2017*; 1:00 pm		at UMass; UMass Thanksgiving Classic	L 61–64	1–4	Mullins Center (396); Amherst, MA
11/28/2017*; 7:00 pm, BSN		Limestone	W 68–38	2–4	Vines Center (1,193); Lynchburg, VA
12/02/2017*; 4:00 pm, LFSN TV/ESPN3		Valparaiso	W 61–40	3–4	Vines Center (1,351); Lynchburg, VA
12/06/2017*; 7:00 pm		at James Madison	L 47–58	3–5	JMU Convocation Center (1,912); Harrisonburg, VA
12/16/2017*; 4:00 pm, BSN		Shippensburg	W 105–43	4–5	Vines Center (1,382); Lynchburg, VA
12/19/2017*; 4:30 pm		vs. Denver; Roo Holiday Classic	W 82–69	5–5	Swinney Recreation Center (186); Kansas City, MO
12/20/2017*; 2:00 pm		vs. Northern Colorado; Roo Holiday Classic	L 57–65	5–6	Swinney Recreation Center (113); Kansas City, MO
12/29/2017*; 7:00 pm, ACCN Extra		at No. 14 Duke	L 51–65	5–7	Cameron Indoor Stadium (3,531); Durham, NC
Big South regular season
01/02/2018; 7:00 pm, BSN		at Presbyterian	W 76–64	6–7 (1–0)	Templeton Center (168); Clinton, SC
01/06/2018; 1:00 pm, LFSN TV/ESPN3		Charleston Southern	W 63–53	7–7 (2–0)	Vines Center (1,168); Lynchburg, VA
01/09/2018; 7:00 pm, LFSN TV/ESPN3		Winthrop	W 63–37	8–7 (3–0)	Vines Center (1,026); Lynchburg, VA
01/13/2018; 3:00 pm, BSN		at Gardner–Webb	W 85–60	9–7 (4–0)	Paul Porter Arena (487); Boiling Springs, NC
01/16/2018; 7:00 pm, BSN		at UNC Asheville	L 41–48	9–8 (4–1)	Kimmel Arena (805); Asheville, NC
01/20/2018; 6:00 pm, LFSN TV/ESPN3		Campbell	W 60–42	10–8 (5–1)	Vines Center (1,426); Lynchburg, VA
01/23/2018; 7:00 pm, BSN		at Longwood	W 63–51	11–8 (6–1)	Willett Hall (379); Farmville, VA
01/28/2018; 7:00 pm, Stadium/BSN		Radford	W 61–56	12–8 (7–1)	Vines Center (1,484); Lynchburg, VA
01/30/2018; 7:00 pm, BSN		at High Point	W 65–42	13–8 (8–1)	Millis Center (567); High Point, NC
02/03/2018; 2:00 pm, LFSN TV/ESPN3		Presbyterian	W 63–55	14–8 (9–1)	Vines Center (1,288); Lynchburg, VA
02/06/2018; 7:00 pm, LFSN TV/ESPN3		Gardner–Webb	W 59–41	15–8 (10–1)	Vines Center (1,096); Lynchburg, VA
02/10/2018; 2:00 pm, ESPN3		at Campbell	W 46–33	16–8 (11–1)	Gore Arena (2,033); Buies Creek, NC
02/13/2018; 7:00 pm, LFSN/ESPN3		at Radford	L 45–52	16–9 (11–2)	Dedmon Center (667); Radford, VA
02/17/2018; 6:00 pm, LFSN TV/ESPN3		UNC Asheville	W 53–48	17–9 (12–2)	Vines Center (1,484); Lynchburg, VA
02/20/2018; 7:00 pm, BSN		at Winthrop	W 73–53	18–9 (13–2)	Winthrop Coliseum (176); Rock Hill, SC
02/24/2018; 3:00 pm, BSN		at Charleston Southern	W 95–57	19–9 (14–2)	CSU Field House (225); Charleston, SC
02/27/2018; 7:00 pm, LFSN TV/ESPN3		Longwood	W 73–36	20–9 (15–2)	Vines Center (1,212); Lynchburg, VA
03/03/2018; 2:00 pm, LFSN TV/ESPN3		High Point	W 65–42	21–9 (16–2)	Vines Center (1,260); Lynchburg, VA
Big South tournament
03/09/2018; 12:00 pm, ESPN3	(1)	(8) Charleston Southern; Quarterfinals	W 80–53	22–9	Vines Center (850); Lynchburg, VA
03/10/2018; 2:00 pm, ESPN3	(1)	(4) High Point; Semifinals	W 78–54	23–9	Vines Center (1,197); Lynchburg, VA
03/11/2018; 2:00 pm, ESPN3	(1)	(3) UNC Asheville; Championship Game	W 60–42	24–9	Vines Center (1,077); Lynchburg, VA
NCAA Women's Tournament
03/16/2018*; 2:30 pm, ESPN2	(14 L)	at (3 L) No. 12 Tennessee; First Round	L 60–100	24–10	Thompson–Boling Arena (4,509); Knoxville, TN
*Non-conference game. ^{#}Rankings from AP Poll. (#) Tournament seedings in parentheses. L=Lexington Region. All times are in Eastern Time.

== See also ==
- 2017–18 Liberty Flames basketball team
