= Erin Batth =

American basketball coach

Current position
- Title: Head coach
- Team: Providence
- Conference: Big East
- Record: 41–58 (.414)

Biographical details
- Born: October 22, 1978 (age 47); Marietta, Georgia, U.S.

Playing career
- 1997–2001: Clemson
- 2001–2003: Panathinaikos
- 2005–2006: Migrosspor

Coaching career (HC unless noted)
- 2004–2005: VCU (asst.)
- 2010–2012: Towson (asst.)
- 2012–2014: Tennessee Tech (asst.)
- 2014–2017: Georgia State (asst.)
- 2017–2018: Liberty (asst.)
- 2018–2022: NC State (asst.)
- 2022–2023: Michigan (asst.)
- 2023–present: Providence

Administrative career (AD unless noted)
- 2007–2010: Virginia (dir. basketball operations)

Head coaching record
- Overall: 41–58 (.414)
- Tournaments: 0–1 (WNIT)

Accomplishments and honors

Awards
- 2x ACC All-Defensive Team (2000, 2001)

Erin Leigh Batth (born October 22, 1978) is an American basketball coach who is currently the head coach for Providence. She played college basketball at Clemson.

== Playing career ==
Batth played college basketball at Clemson where she was named a second-team Defensive All-American, and member of the ACC's All-Defensive Team as a junior and senior. During her senior year in 2000–01, she ranked second on the team in scoring with 12.1 points per game and led the team with 8.7 rebounds per game. Following the season she was named to the All-ACC Second Team, and ACC All-Defensive Team. She helped lead the Tigers to the ACC women's basketball tournament championship in 1999, and four-consecutive NCAA Tournament appearances, including the Sweet 16 in 1999. She finished her career with 972 points, 722 rebounds and 116 blocked shots. She was drafted in the fourth round, 59th overall, by the Cleveland Rockers in the 2001 WNBA draft. She became the first Clemson player ever drafted in the Women's National Basketball Association (WNBA).

Following her collegiate career, Batth played professionally in Europe for Panathinaikos in the Greek Women's Basketball League and Migrosspor in the Turkish Women's Basketball League. While playing in Turkey in 2005, she suffered a broken foot and returned to the States, where she became an executive assistant to the general manager and operations specialist for both the NBA's Sacramento Kings and the WNBA's Sacramento Monarchs.

== Coaching career ==
Batth began her coaching career as an assistant coach at VCU during the 2004–05 season. On July 10, 2007, she was named director of operations for Virginia, a position she held until 2010. The Cavalier teams advanced to the NCAA Tournament each of the three years that Batth was at Virginia. In 2010 she was named an assistant coach for Towson. On July 14, 2012, she was named an assistant coach for Tennessee Tech She also served as recruiting coordinator. The 2012–13 Golden Eagles finished first in the Ohio Valley Conference with 19 wins. On April 22, 2014, she was named an assistant coach for Georgia State.

=== Liberty ===
In April 2017, she was named an assistant coach for Liberty. Batth was recruited out of high school by Liberty head coach Carey Green, when Green was serving as an assistant coach at Clemson. She helped lead the Lady Flames to the Big South regular-season and 2018 Big South Conference women's basketball tournament championship, and an appearance in the 2018 NCAA Tournament.

=== NC State ===
On June 13, 2018, she was named assistant coach for NC State. On September 23, 2020, she was promoted to recruiting coordinator. During her four seasons as an assistant coach, NC State compiled a 110–17 (55–11 ACC) record, earned four top-10 final rankings and reached the Sweet 16 in 2019 and 2021 and the Elite Eight in 2022. She also helped the Wolfpack to three consecutive ACC women's basketball tournament championships from 2020 to 2022.

=== Michigan ===
On April 29, 2022, she was named an assistant coach and recruiting coordinator for Michigan. She replaced Carrie Moore who left Michigan and became the head coach at Harvard. In her lone season at Michigan, she helped guide them to a 23–10 record, and their 11th NCAA Tournament appearance.

=== Providence ===
On March 20, 2023, she was named head coach for Providence. She became the first black female coach in program history.

== Head coaching record ==
Statistics overview
| Season | Team | Overall | Conference | Standing | Postseason |
|---|---|---|---|---|---|
Providence Friars (Big East Conference) (2023–present)
| 2023–24 | Providence | 13–21 | 6–12 | T–8th | WNIT Second Round |
| 2024–25 | Providence | 13–19 | 6–12 | 7th | |
| 2025–26 | Providence | 15–18 | 7–13 | 7th | |
| Providence: | | 41–58 (.414) | 19–37 (.339) | | |
| Total: | | 41–58 (.414) | | | |
National champion Postseason invitational champion Conference regular season champion Conference regular season and conference tournament champion Division regular season champion Division regular season and conference tournament champion Conference tournament champion
