= 2017–18 Presbyterian Blue Hose women's basketball team =

Intercollegiate basketball season

2017–18 Presbyterian Blue Hose women's basketball
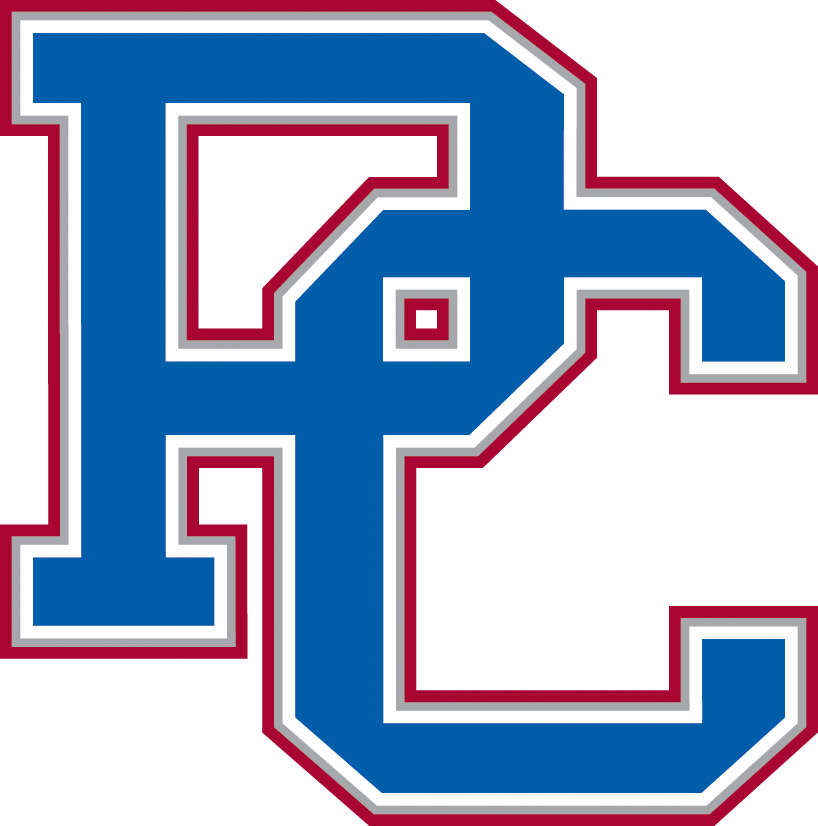
- Conference: Big South Conference
- Record: 12–18 (9–9 Big South)
- Head coach: Todd Steelman (2nd season)
- Assistant coaches: Megan Buckland; Jordan Hiatt
- Home arena: Templeton Physical Education Center (Capacity: 2,300)

2017–18 Big South women's basketball standings
	Conf.				Overall
Team	W		L	PCT	W		L	PCT
Liberty †	16	–	2	.889	24	–	10	.706
Radford	15	–	3	.833	24	–	9	.727
UNC Asheville	12	–	6	.667	17	–	16	.515
High Point	10	–	8	.556	17	–	14	.548
Presbyterian	9	–	9	.500	12	–	18	.400
Gardner–Webb	8	–	10	.444	19	–	13	.594
Campbell	8	–	10	.444	15	–	15	.500
Charleston Southern	5	–	13	.278	11	–	20	.355
Longwood	5	–	13	.278	7	–	23	.233
Winthrop	2	–	16	.111	3	–	27	.100
† 2018 Big South tournament winner As of March 17, 2018; Rankings from AP poll

The 2017–18 Presbyterian Blue Hose women's basketball team represented Presbyterian College in the 2017–18 NCAA Division I women's basketball season. They were led by second-year coach Todd Steelman as members of the Big South Conference. They finished the season 12–18, 9–9 in Big South play, to finish in fifth place. They lost in the quarterfinals of the Big South women's basketball tournament to High Point.

== Roster ==
2017–18 Presbyterian Blue Hose women's basketball team
Players
Coaches

Pos.	#	Name	Height	Year	Previous school	Hometown
SF	0	Nicole Hofmann	5 ft 9 in (1.75 m)	Fr	Charnwood College	Chorley, England
G	3	Riley Hemm	5 ft 6 in (1.68 m)	So	Sacred Heart HS	Redwood City, CA
G	4	Josie Tarlton	5 ft 11 in (1.8 m)	Fr	Apex HS	Apex, NC
G	10	Cortney Storey	5 ft 6 in (1.68 m)	Sr	Lincoln County HS	Fayetteville, TN
G	11	Kacie Hall	5 ft 7 in (1.7 m)	So	South Webster HS	South Webster, OH
G	12	Macee Tamminen	5 ft 8 in (1.73 m)	Fr	Hilton Head Christian Academy	Bluffton, SC
G	14	Janie Miles	5 ft 7 in (1.7 m)	Sr	Daniel HS	Clemson, SC
F	15	Tess Santos	6 ft 0 in (1.83 m)	Fr	German School of Lisbon	Lisbon, Portugal
F	21	Paloma Gragera	6 ft 2 in (1.88 m)	So	Montverde Academy	Tres Cantos, Spain
SF	22	Kiara Jackson	5 ft 10 in (1.78 m)	Fr	North Augusta HS	North Augusta, SC
G	24	Mattie Kennedy	5 ft 10 in (1.78 m)	Fr	Carroll County HS	Hillsville, VA
G	30	Briley Buckner	6 ft 0 in (1.83 m)	Fr	Union County HS	Maynardville, TN
F	32	Salina Virola	6 ft 2 in (1.88 m)	Jr	Lee HS	Huntsville, AL
C	44	Ericka Blackwell-Boyden	6 ft 4 in (1.93 m)	RS So	Chopticon HS	Clements, MD
F	45	Allie Wagner	6 ft 1 in (1.85 m)	Sr	Wren HS	Easley, SC

Head coach

Todd Steelman (John Brown)

Assistant coach(es)

- Megan Buckland (North Carolina)
- Jordan Hiatt (Lenoir–Rhyne)

Legend

- (C) Team captain
- (S) Suspended
- (I) Ineligible
- (W) Walk-on
- Injured
- Current redshirt

Roster
Last update: January 25, 2025

== Schedule ==
Date time, TV	Rank^{#}	Opponent^{#}	Result	Record	High points	High rebounds	High assists	Site (attendance) city, state
Non-conference regular season
November 10, 2017*; 3:00 p.m.		at San Diego State	L 50–77	0–1	22 – Storey	6 – Storey	5 – Hall	Viejas Arena (464); San Diego, CA
November 12, 2017*; 5:00 p.m., P12N		at No. 7 UCLA	L 40–76	0–2	18 – Storey	4 – 2 tied	3 – Storey	Pauley Pavilion (1,101); Los Angeles, CA
November 15, 2017*; 7:00 p.m., ESPN3		at USC Upstate	W 83–69	1–2	27 – Storey	6 – 2 tied	6 – Miles	G. B. Hodge Center (317); Spartanburg, SC
November 18, 2017*; 11:00 a.m.		at Chattanooga	L 51–71	1–3	17 – Miles	7 – Jackson	8 – Storey	McKenzie Arena (2,780); Chattanooga, TN
November 21, 2017*; 7:00 p.m., BSN		Kennesaw State	L 51–60	1–4	13 – 2 tied	6 – Blackwell-Boyden	7 – Storey	Templeton Center (126); Clinton, SC
November 26, 2017*; 2:00 p.m., ACCN Extra		at No. 16 Duke	L 45–79	1–5	11 – Buckner	6 – Miles	6 – Storey	Cameron Indoor Stadium (3,266); Durham, NC
December 1, 2017*; 12:00 p.m., OVCDN		at Belmont	L 48–90	1–6	11 – Miles	5 – Kennedy	5 – Miles	Curb Event Center (1,371); Nashville, TN
December 5, 2017*; 6:00 p.m., ACCN Extra		at North Carolina	L 56–91	1–7	20 – Storey	3 – 3 tied	6 – Storey	Carmichael Arena (2,304); Chapel Hill, NC
December 17, 2017*; 2:00 p.m., BSN		North Carolina Central	W 69–60	2–7	26 – Storey	8 – Miles	5 – Storey	Templeton Center (204); Clinton, SC
December 21, 2017*; 12:00 p.m., BSN		UNC Greensboro	L 57–64	2–8	18 – Storey	8 – Santos	4 – Storey	Templeton Center (210); Clinton, SC
December 30, 2017*; 2:00 p.m., BSN		Furman	W 76–75 ^{OT}	3–8	24 – Storey	5 – Blackwell-Boyden	6 – Storey	Templeton Center (283); Clinton, SC
Big South regular season
January 2, 2018; 7:00 p.m., BSN		Liberty	L 64–76	3–9 (0–1)	19 – Santos	5 – Santos	8 – Storey	Templeton Center (168); Clinton, SC
January 6, 2018; 5:00 p.m., BSN		at Longwood	L 56–66	3–10 (0–2)	19 – Hall	5 – 2 tied	4 – Storey	Willett Hall (634); Farmville, VA
January 9, 2018; 7:00 p.m., BSN		at High Point	L 55–81	3–11 (0–3)	10 – Jackson	6 – 2 tied	4 – Storey	Millis Center (468); High Point, NC
January 13, 2018; 2:00 p.m., BSN		Campbell	W 65–59	4–11 (1–3)	23 – Hall	4 – Buckner	5 – Storey	Templeton Center (373); Clinton, SC
January 16, 2018; 7:00 p.m., BSN		Gardner–Webb	W 72–69	5–11 (2–3)	20 – Hall	6 – Miles	9 – Storey	Templeton Center (217); Clinton, SC
January 20, 2018; 2:00 p.m., BSN		at Radford	L 55–93	5–12 (2–4)	20 – Storey	4 – 2 tied	5 – Storey	Dedmon Center (772); Radford, VA
January 23, 2018; 7:00 p.m., BSN		Winthrop	W 75–48	6–12 (3–4)	16 – Hall	9 – Miles	14 – Storey	Templeton Center (256); Clinton, SC
January 27, 2018; 2:00 p.m., ESPN3		at UNC Asheville	W 76–74	7–12 (4–4)	20 – Hall	7 – Santos	9 – Storey	Kimmel Arena (2,104); Asheville, NC
January 30, 2018; 7:00 p.m., BSN		Charleston Southern	L 61–64	7–13 (4–5)	14 – Miles	8 – Santos	9 – Storey	Templeton Center (335); Clinton, SC
February 3, 2018; 2:00 p.m., BSN		at Liberty	L 55–63	7–14 (4–6)	13 – Miles	6 – Santos	7 – Storey	Vines Center (1,288); Lynchburg, VA
February 6, 2018; 7:00 p.m., BSN		at Winthrop	W 64–58	8–14 (5–6)	14 – Storey	9 – Kennedy	7 – Storey	Winthrop Coliseum (326); Rock Hill, SC
February 10, 2018; 2:00 p.m., BSN		Longwood	L 60–75	8–15 (5–7)	14 – Storey	7 – Miles	6 – Storey	Templeton Center (279); Clinton, SC
February 13, 2018; 7:00 p.m., BSN		at Campbell	L 40–53	8–16 (5–8)	15 – Storey	8 – Storey	4 – Storey	Gore Arena (862); Buies Creek, NC
February 17, 2018; 2:00 p.m., BSN		High Point	W 62–55	9–16 (6–8)	26 – Storey	8 – Miles	3 – 3 tied	Templeton Center (263); Clinton, SC
February 20, 2018; 7:00 p.m., BSN		at Gardner–Webb	W 60–50	10–16 (7–8)	18 – Hall	11 – Miles	5 – Storey	Paul Porter Arena (211); Boiling Springs, NC
February 24, 2018; 2:00 p.m., BSN		Radford	L 40–64	10–17 (7–9)	15 – Storey	5 – Storey	5 – Storey	Templeton Center (261); Clinton, SC
February 27, 2018; 7:00 p.m., BSN		UNC Asheville	W 72–63 ^{OT}	11–17 (8–9)	30 – Storey	7 – Santos	6 – Storey	Templeton Center (317); Clinton, SC
March 3, 2018; 3:00 p.m., BSN		at Charleston Southern	W 81–58	12–17 (9–9)	23 – Hall	6 – Blackwell-Boyden	6 – Storey	CSU Field House; North Charleston, SC
Big South tournament
March 9, 2018; 2:00 p.m., ESPN3	(5)	vs. (4) High Point; Quarterfinals	L 60–62	12–18	22 – Storey	7 – Santos	5 – Storey	Vines Center (850); Lynchburg, VA
*Non-conference game. (#) Tournament seedings in parentheses. All times are in Eastern.

== See also ==
- 2017–18 Presbyterian Blue Hose men's basketball team
