= 2014 Liberty Flames football team =

American college football season

2014 Liberty Flames football

Big South co-champion

FCS Playoffs Second Round, L 22–29 vs. Villanova
- Conference: Big South Conference

Ranking
- Sports Network: No. 17
- FCS Coaches: No. 17
- Record: 9–5 (4–1 Big South)
- Head coach: Turner Gill (3rd season)
- Offensive coordinator: Aaron Stamn (3rd season)
- Offensive scheme: Spread
- Co-defensive coordinators: Robert Wimberly (3rd season); Vantz Singletary (3rd season)
- Base defense: 4–3
- Home stadium: Williams Stadium

2014 Big South Conference football standings
| | Conf. | | | Overall |
| Team | W | | L | W | | L |
|---|---|---|---|---|---|---|
| No. 5 Coastal Carolina +^ | 4 | – | 1 | 12 | – | 2 |
| No. 17 Liberty +^ | 4 | – | 1 | 9 | – | 5 |
| Charleston Southern | 3 | – | 2 | 8 | – | 4 |
| Presbyterian | 3 | – | 2 | 6 | – | 5 |
| Monmouth | 1 | – | 4 | 6 | – | 5 |
| Gardner–Webb | 0 | – | 5 | 4 | – | 8 |
+ – Conference co-champions; ^ – FCS playoff participant; Rankings from The Sports Network poll

The 2014 Liberty Flames football team represented Liberty University in the 2014 NCAA Division I FCS football season. They were led by third-year head coach Turner Gill and played their home games at Williams Stadium. They were a member of the Big South Conference. They finished the season 9–4, 4–1 in Big South play to share the conference championship with Coastal Carolina. They received the Big South's automatic bid to the FCS Playoffs where they defeated James Madison in the first round before losing in the second round to Villanova.

== Schedule ==
| Date | Time | Opponent | Rank | Site | TV | Result | Attendance |
|---|---|---|---|---|---|---|---|
| August 30 | 6:00 pm | at No. 23 (FBS) North Carolina* | | Kenan Memorial Stadium; Chapel Hill, NC | ESPN3 | L 29–56 | 51,000 |
| September 6 | 4:00 pm | at Norfolk State* | | William "Dick" Price Stadium; Norfolk, VA | LFSN | W 17–0 | 6,150 |
| September 13 | 7:00 pm | Brevard* | | Williams Stadium; Lynchburg, VA | LFSN | W 56–31 | 15,755 |
| September 20 | 7:00 pm | Bryant* | No. 24 | Williams Stadium; Lynchburg, VA | LFSN | W 38–21 | 16,873 |
| September 27 | 3:00 pm | at Indiana State* | No. 22 | Memorial Stadium; Terre Haute, IN | LFSN | L 19–38 | 5,633 |
| October 4 | 7:00 pm | No. 20 Richmond*^{†} | | Williams Stadium; Lynchburg, VA | LFSN | L 39–46 ^{2OT} | 20,838 |
| October 11 | 3:30 pm | at Appalachian State* | | Kidd Brewer Stadium; Boone, NC | ESPN3 | W 55–48 ^{OT} | 26,058 |
| October 25 | 3:30 pm | Gardner–Webb | | Williams Stadium; Lynchburg, VA | ESPN3 | W 34–0 | 20,217 |
| November 1 | 2:00 pm | at Presbyterian | | Bailey Memorial Stadium; Clinton, SC | LFSN | W 28–7 | 2,691 |
| November 8 | 3:30 pm | Monmouth | | Williams Stadium; Lynchburg, VA | ASN | W 34–24 | 16,053 |
| November 15 | 3:30 pm | Charleston Southern | | Williams Stadium; Lynchburg, VA | LFSN | L 36–38 | 12,362 |
| November 22 | 1:00 pm | at No. 1 Coastal Carolina | | Brooks Stadium; Conway, SC (rivalry) | ESPN3 | W 15–14 | 8,576 |
| November 29 | 4:00 pm | at No. 15 James Madison* | No. 20 | Bridgeforth Stadium; Harrisonburg, VA (NCAA Division I First Round) | ESPN3 | W 26–21 | 13,040 |
| December 6 | 4:30 pm | at No. 5 Villanova* | No. 20 | Villanova Stadium; Villanova, PA (NCAA Division I Second Round) | ESPN3 | L 22–29 | 3,113 |
*Non-conference game; ^{†}Homecoming; Rankings from The Sports Network Poll released prior to the game; All times are in Eastern time

- Source: Schedule

== Game summaries ==
=== @ North Carolina ===
Liberty @ North Carolina

| Team | 1 | 2 | 3 | 4 | Total |
|---|---|---|---|---|---|
| Flames | 7 | 8 | 7 | 7 | 29 |
| • #23 Tar Heels | 14 | 7 | 28 | 7 | 56 |

- Date: August 30
- Location: Kenan Memorial Stadium
  Chapel Hill, NC
- Game start: 6:00 PM EDT
- Game attendance: 51,000
- Television network: ESPN3

Scoring summary
| 1 | 11:25 | UNC | Bug Howard 7-yard pass from Marquise Williams, Thomas Moore kick | UNC 7–0 |
| 1 | 4:44 | LIB | Todd Macon 1-yard run, Avery Echols kick | Tied 7–7 |
| 1 | 3:22 | UNC | Romar Morris 1-yard run, Thomas Moore kick | UNC 14–7 |
| 2 | 5:09 | LIB | Team Safety | UNC 14–9 |
| 2 | 1:37 | LIB | D.J. Abner 1-yard run, two-point conversion failed | LIB 15–14 |
| 2 | 0:28 | UNC | Marquise Williams 3-yard run, Nick Weiler kick | UNC 21–15 |
| 3 | 9:25 | LIB | Jacob Hagan 27-yard fumble return, Avery Echols kick | LIB 22–21 |
| 3 | 5:55 | UNC | Mack Hollins 33-yard pass from Marquise Williams, Nick Weiler kick | UNC 28–22 |
| 3 | 5:42 | UNC | Jeff Schoettmer 19-yard interception return, Nick Weiler kick | UNC 35–22 |
| 3 | 3:47 | UNC | Marquise Williams 15-yard run, Nick Weiler kick | UNC 42–22 |
| 3 | 2:06 | UNC | Jack Tabb 4-yard pass from Mitch Trubisky, Nick Weiler kick | UNC 49–22 |
| 4 | 10:16 | LIB | Todd Macon 1-yard run, Avery Echols kick | UNC 49–29 |
| 4 | 1:16 | UNC | Charles Brunson 2-yard run, Nick Weiler kick | UNC 56–29 |

In their first game of the season, the Flames lost, 56–29 to the North Carolina Tar Heels.

=== @ Norfolk State ===
Liberty @ Norfolk State

| Team | 1 | 2 | 3 | 4 | Total |
|---|---|---|---|---|---|
| • Flames | 3 | 7 | 0 | 7 | 17 |
| Spartans | 0 | 0 | 0 | 0 | 0 |

- Date: September 6
- Location: William "Dick" Price Stadium
  Norfolk, VA
- Game start: 4:00 PM EDT
- Game attendance: 6,150
- Television network: LFSN

Scoring summary
| 1 | 2:47 | LIB | Avery Echols 22-yard kick good | LIB 3–0 |
| 2 | 6:39 | LIB | Josh Woodrum 7-yard run, Avery Echols kick | LIB 10–0 |
| 4 | 5:52 | LIB | D.J. Abnar 22-yard pass from Josh Woodrum, Avery Echols kick | LIB 17–0 |

In their second game of the season, the Flames won, 17–0 over the Norfolk State Spartans.

=== Brevard ===
Brevard @ Liberty

| Team | 1 | 2 | 3 | 4 | Total |
|---|---|---|---|---|---|
| Tornadoes | 0 | 17 | 7 | 7 | 31 |
| • Flames | 21 | 14 | 7 | 14 | 56 |

- Date: September 13
- Location: Williams Stadium
  Lynchburg, VA
- Game start: 7:00 PM EDT
- Game attendance: 15,755
- Television network: LFSN

Scoring summary
| 1 | 12:03 | LIB | D.J. Abnar 13-yard run, John Lunsford kick | LIB 7–0 |
| 1 | 8:47 | LIB | Dante Shells 38-yard pass from Josh Woodrum, John Lunsford kick | LIB 14–0 |
| 1 | 3:19 | LIB | Todd Macon 3-yard run, John Lunsford kick | LIB 21–0 |
| 2 | 10:40 | BRE | Jordan Ollis 2-yard run, Alex Noboa kick | LIB 21–7 |
| 2 | 10:29 | LIB | Zac Parker 65-yard run, John Lunsford kick | LIB 28–7 |
| 2 | 4:20 | BRE | Jordan Ollis 6-yard run, Alex Noboa kick | LIB 28–14 |
| 2 | 1:42 | LIB | D.J. Abnar 7-yard run, John Lunsford kick | LIB 35–14 |
| 2 | 0:18 | BRE | Alex Noboa 42-yard kick good | LIB 35–17 |
| 3 | 7:52 | BRE | Tanner Wright 5-yard run, Alex Noboa kick | LIB 35–24 |
| 3 | 2:38 | LIB | Dexter Herman 10-yard pass from Josh Woodrum, John Lunsford kick | LIB 42–24 |
| 4 | 13:53 | LIB | Darrin Peterson 86-yard pass from Josh Woodrum, John Lunsford kick | LIB 49–24 |
| 4 | 9:32 | BRE | Jordan Ollis 1-yard run, Alex Noboa kick | LIB 49–31 |
| 4 | 7:33 | LIB | Gabe Henderson 32-yard pass from Josh Woodrum, John Lunsford kick | LIB 56–31 |

In their third game of the season, the Flames won, 56–31 over the Brevard Tornadoes.

=== Bryant ===
Bryant @ Liberty

| Team | 1 | 2 | 3 | 4 | Total |
|---|---|---|---|---|---|
| Bulldogs | 0 | 14 | 0 | 7 | 21 |
| • #24 Flames | 10 | 14 | 7 | 7 | 38 |

- Date: September 20
- Location: Williams Stadium
  Lynchburg, VA
- Game start: 7:00 PM EDT
- Game attendance: 16,873
- Television network: LFSN

Scoring summary
| 1 | 7:41 | LIB | John Lunsford 57 yard kick good | LIB 3–0 |
| 1 | 2:42 | LIB | Josh Woodrum 10-yard run, John Lunsford kick | LIB 10–0 |
| 2 | 13:46 | LIB | D.J. Abnar 3-yard run, John Lunsford kick | LIB 17–0 |
| 2 | 5:19 | LIB | D.J. Abnar 22-yard run, John Lunsford kick | LIB 24–0 |
| 2 | 2:22 | BRY | Ricardo McCray 11-yard pass from Dalton Easton, Tom Alberti kick | LIB 24–7 |
| 2 | 0:41 | BRY | Ricardo McCray 2-yard run, Tom Alberti kick | LIB 24–14 |
| 3 | 10:48 | LIB | Thomas Kennedy 4-yard pass from Josh Woodrum, John Lunsford kick | LIB 31–14 |
| 4 | 12:17 | LIB | Josh Woodrum 30-yard run, John Lunsford kick | LIB 38–14 |
| 4 | 8:05 | BRY | Paul Canevari 1-yard run, Tom Alberti kick | LIB 38–21 |

In their fourth game of the season, the Flames won, 38–21 over the Bryant Bulldogs.

=== @ Indiana State ===
Liberty @ Indiana State

| Team | 1 | 2 | 3 | 4 | Total |
|---|---|---|---|---|---|
| #22 Flames | 3 | 10 | 0 | 6 | 19 |
| • Sycamores | 3 | 21 | 0 | 14 | 38 |

- Date: September 27
- Location: Memorial Stadium
  Terre Haute, IN
- Game start: 3:00 PM EDT
- Game attendance: 5,633
- Television network: LFSN

Scoring summary
| 1 | 11:00 | LIB | Eric Heidorn 25-yard kick good | INST 3–0 |
| 1 | 4:30 | INST | John Lunsford 22-yard kick good | Tied 3–3 |
| 2 | 11:19 | INST | Gary Owens 17-yard pass from Mike Perish, Eric Heidorn kick | INST 10–3 |
| 2 | 11:03 | LIB | Dante Shell 71-yard pass from Josh Woodrum, John Lunsford kick | Tied 10–10 |
| 2 | 9:16 | INST | Dimitri Taylor 6-yard pass from Mike Perish, Eric Heidorn kick | INST 17–10 |
| 2 | 3:16 | LIB | John Lunsford 48-yard kick good | INST 17–13 |
| 2 | 0:10 | INST | Robert Tonyan Jr. 14-yard pass from Mike Perish, Eric Heidorn kick | INST 24–13 |
| 4 | 6:10 | INST | Mike Perish 1-yard run, Eric Heidorn kick | INST 31–13 |
| 4 | 4:51 | LIB | Darrin Peterson 8-yard pass from Josh Woodrum, two-point conversion failed | INST 31–19 |
| 4 | 12:03 | INST | Buck Logan 7-yard run, Eric Heidorn kick | INST 38–19 |

In their fifth game of the season, the Flames lost, 38–19 to the Indiana State Sycamores.

=== Richmond ===
Richmond @ Liberty

| Team | 1 | 2 | 3 | 4 | OT | 2OT | Total |
|---|---|---|---|---|---|---|---|
| • #20 Spiders | 15 | 7 | 0 | 10 | 7 | 7 | 46 |
| Flames | 0 | 7 | 15 | 10 | 7 | 0 | 39 |

- Date: October 4
- Location: Williams Stadium
  Lynchburg, VA
- Game start: 7:00 PM EDT
- Game attendance: 20,838
- Television network: LFSN

Scoring summary
| 1 | 7:19 | RICH | Seth Fisher 2-yard pass from Michael Rocco, Peter Yoder kick | RICH 7–0 |
| 1 | 0:30 | RICH | Seth Fisher 8-yard pass from Michael Strauss, Porter Abell pass to Brian Brown for two-point conversion | RICH 15–0 |
| 2 | 11:09 | LIB | Josh Woodrum 1-yard run, John Lunsford kick | RICH 15–7 |
| 2 | 2:51 | RICH | Michael Strauss 1-yard run, Peter Yoder kick | RICH 22–7 |
| 3 | 11:35 | LIB | Josh Woodrum 8-yard run, John Lunsford kick | RICH 22–15 |
| 3 | 5:03 | LIB | Darrin Peterson 16-yard pass from Josh Woodrum, Josh Woodrum run for two-point conversions | Tied 22–22 |
| 4 | 11:42 | RICH | Stephen Barnette 3-yard pass from Michael Strauss, Peter Yoder kick | RICH 29–22 |
| 4 | 2:02 | LIB | Darrin Peterson 11-yard pass from Josh Woodrum, John Lundsford kick | Tied 29–29 |
| 4 | 0:08 | RICH | Peter Yoder 21-yard kick good | RICH 32–29 |
| 4 | 0:00 | LIB | John Lundsford 60-yard kick good | Tied 32–32 |
| OT | 0:00 | LIB | Darrin Peterson 15-yard pass from Josh Woodrum, John Lundsford kick | LIB 39–32 |
| OT | 0:00 | RICH | Seth Fisher 16-yard run, Peter Yoder kick | Tied 39–39 |
| 2OT | 0:00 | RICH | Seth Fisher 1-yard run, Peter Yoder kick | RICH 46–39 |

In their sixth game of the season, the Flames lost, 46–39, in double overtime, to the Richmond Spiders.

=== @ Appalachian State ===
Liberty @ Appalachian State

| Team | 1 | 2 | 3 | 4 | OT | Total |
|---|---|---|---|---|---|---|
| • Flames | 14 | 14 | 13 | 7 | 7 | 55 |
| Mountaineers | 7 | 17 | 16 | 8 | 0 | 48 |

- Date: October 11
- Location: Kidd Brewer Stadium
  Boone, NC
- Game start: 3:30 PM EDT
- Game attendance: 20,058
- Television network: ESPN3

Scoring summary
| 1 | 14:52 | APP | Marcus Cox 38-yard run, Bentlee Critcher kick | APP 7–0 |
| 1 | 8:23 | LIB | D.J. Abnar 1-yard run, John Lundsford kick | Tied 7–7 |
| 1 | 0:46 | LIB | Dexter Herman 24-yard pass from Josh Woodrum, John Lunsford kick | LIB 14–7 |
| 2 | 14:49 | APP | Simms McElfresh 63-yard pass from Taylor Lamb, Bentlee Critcher kick | Tied 14–14 |
| 2 | 11:50 | APP | Aaron Krah 0-yard fumble return, Bentlee Critcher kick | APP 21–14 |
| 2 | 11:42 | LIB | Dante Shells 75-yard pass from Josh Woodrum, John Lunsford kick | Tied 21–21 |
| 2 | 6:58 | LIB | Kenny Scott 39-yard fumble return, John Lundsford kick | LIB 28–21 |
| 2 | 0:04 | APP | Bentlee Critcher 33-yard kick good | LIB 28–24 |
| 3 | 12:11 | LIB | John Lunsford 33-yard kick good | LIB 31–24 |
| 3 | 11:36 | APP | Bobo Beathard 60-yard pass from Taylor Lamb, Bentlee Critcher kick | Tied 31–31 |
| 3 | 8:29 | LIB | John Lunsford 35-yard kick good | LIB 34–31 |
| 3 | 6:42 | APP | Shaedon Meadors 48-yard pass from Taylor Lamb, Bentlee Critcher kick failed | APP 37–34 |
| 3 | 4:47 | APP | Bentlee Critcher 38-yard kick good | APP 40–34 |
| 3 | 0:29 | LIB | D.J. Abnar 1-yard run, John Lundsford kick | LIB 41–40 |
| 4 | 12:46 | APP | Terrance Upshaw 60-yard run, Taylor Lamb pass to Bobo Beatheart for two-point conversion | APP 48–41 |
| 4 | 6:19 | LIB | Josh Woodrum 13-yard run, John Lundsford kick | Tied 48–48 |
| OT | 0:00 | LIB | Darrin Peterson 9-yard pass from Josh Woodrum, John Lundsford kick | LIB 55–48 |

In their seventh game of the season, the Flames won, 55–48, in overtime, over the Appalachian State Mountaineers.

=== Gardner–Webb ===
Gardner–Webb @ Liberty

| Team | 1 | 2 | 3 | 4 | Total |
|---|---|---|---|---|---|
| Runnin' Bulldogs | 0 | 0 | 0 | 0 | 0 |
| • Flames | 10 | 10 | 14 | 0 | 34 |

- Date: October 25
- Location: Williams Stadium
  Lynchburg, VA
- Game start: 3:30 PM EDT
- Game attendance: 20,217
- TV announcers (ESPN3): Mike Hogewood and Mike Gleason

Scoring summary
| 1 | 9:00 | LIB | Josh Woodrum 4-yard run, John Lunsford kick | LIB 7–0 |
| 1 | 5:54 | LIB | John Lundsford 35-yard kick good | LIB 10–0 |
| 2 | 11:12 | LIB | D.J. Abnar 19-yard run, John Lunsford kick | LIB 17–0 |
| 2 | 0:00 | LIB | John Lunsford 39-yard kick good | LIB 20–0 |
| 3 | 12:48 | LIB | D.J. Abnar 5-yard run, John Lunsford kick | LIB 27–0 |
| 3 | 10:52 | LIB | Jaquan Glover 6-yard pass from Josh Woodrum, John Lundsford kick | LIB 34–0 |

In their eighth game of the season, the Flames won, 34–0, over the Gardner–Webb Runnin' Bulldogs.

=== @ Presbyterian ===
Liberty @ Presbyterian

| Team | 1 | 2 | 3 | 4 | Total |
|---|---|---|---|---|---|
| • Flames | 7 | 14 | 0 | 7 | 28 |
| Blue Hose | 0 | 0 | 0 | 7 | 7 |

- Date: November 1
- Location: Bailey Memorial Stadium
  Clinton, SC
- Game start: 2:00 PM EDT
- Game attendance: 2,691
- Television network: LFSN

Scoring summary
| 1 | 11:35 | LIB | Josh Woodrum 2-yard run, John Lundsford kick | LIB 7–0 |
| 2 | 7:44 | LIB | Gabe Henderson 29-yard pass from Josh Woodrum, John Lundsford kick | LIB 14–0 |
| 2 | 2:39 | LIB | Darrin Peterson 70-yard pass from Josh Woodrum, John Lundsford kick | LIB 21–0 |
| 4 | 9:25 | PRE | Jordan Hallum 5-yard run, Brandon Morrow kick | LIB 21–7 |
| 4 | 1:03 | LIB | D.J. Abnar 1-yard run, John Lundsford kick | LIB 28–7 |

In their ninth game of the season, the Flames won, 28–7, over the Presbyterian Blue Hose.

=== Monmouth ===
Monmouth @ Liberty

| Team | 1 | 2 | 3 | 4 | Total |
|---|---|---|---|---|---|
| Hawks | 7 | 7 | 10 | 0 | 24 |
| • Flames | 7 | 10 | 7 | 10 | 34 |

- Date: November 8
- Location: Williams Stadium
  Lynchburg, VA
- Game start: 3:30 PM EST
- Game attendance: 16,053
- Television network: ASN

Scoring summary
| 1 | 9:31 | LIB | D.J. Abnar 5-yard run, John Lundsford kick | LIB 7–0 |
| 1 | 8:49 | MON | Hakeem Valles 68-yard pass from Matt Choi, Lucas Santangelo kick | Tied 7–7 |
| 2 | 14:31 | LIB | Darrin Peterson 31-yard pass from Josh Woodrum, John Lundsford kick | LIB 14–7 |
| 2 | 12:09 | MON | Jake Mauro 3-yard pass from Brandon Hill, Lucas Santangelo kick | Tied 14–14 |
| 2 | 0:00 | LIB | John Lundsford 26-yard kick good | LIB 17–14 |
| 3 | 8:25 | MON | Lucas Santangelo 24-yard kick good | Tied 17–17 |
| 3 | 5:07 | LIB | Gabe Henderson 13-yard pass from Josh Woodrum, Josh Lundsford kick | LIB 24–17 |
| 3 | 3:30 | MON | Darren Ambush 37-yard pass from Brandon Hill, Lucas Santangelo kick | Tied 24–24 |
| 4 | 10:19 | LIB | D.J. Abnar 2-yard run, John Lundsford kick | LIB 31–24 |
| 4 | 3:27 | LIB | John Lundsford 27-yard kick good | LIB 34–24 |

In their tenth game of the season, the Flames won, 34–24, over the Monmouth Hawks.

=== Charleston Southern ===
Charleston Southern @ Liberty

| Team | 1 | 2 | 3 | 4 | Total |
|---|---|---|---|---|---|
| • Buccaneers | 0 | 17 | 14 | 7 | 38 |
| Flames | 3 | 13 | 7 | 13 | 36 |

- Date: November 15
- Location: Williams Stadium
  Lynchburg, VA
- Game start: 3:30 PM EST
- Game attendance: 12,362
- Television network: LFSN

Scoring summary
| 1 | 11:34 | LIB | John Lundsford 51-yard kick good | LIB 3–0 |
| 2 | 13:20 | CHSO | Christian Reyes 4-yard run, David Kennedy kick | CHSO 7–3 |
| 2 | 10:22 | LIB | Darrin Peterson 6-yard pass from Stephon Masha, John Lundsford kick | LIB 10–7 |
| 2 | 7:03 | CHSO | Christian Reyes 52-yard run, David Kennedy kick | CHSO 14–10 |
| 2 | 2:21 | LIB | Darrin Peterson 19-yard pass from Stephon Masha, John Lundsford kick failed | LIB 16–14 |
| 2 | 0:15 | CHSO | David Kennedy 27-yard kick good | CHSO 17–16 |
| 3 | 10:01 | CHSO | Nathan Prater 11-yard pass from Austin Brown, David Kennedy kick | CHSO 24–16 |
| 3 | 8:11 | LIB | Darrin Peterson 16-yard pass from Stephon Masha, John Lundsford kick | CHSO 24–23 |
| 3 | 6:35 | CHSO | Ben Robinson 2-yard run, David Kennedy kick | CHSO 31–23 |
| 4 | 13:04 | CHSO | Mike Holloway 40-yard run, David Kennedy kick | CHSO 38–23 |
| 4 | 10:09 | LIB | Gabe Henderson 26-yard pass from Stephon Masha, two-point conversion failed | CHSO 38–29 |
| 4 | 5:24 | LIB | D.J. Abnar 3-yard run, John Lundsford kick | CHSO 38–36 |

In their eleventh game of the season, the Flames lost, 38–36, to the Charleston Southern Buccaneers.

=== @ Coastal Carolina ===
Liberty @ Coastal Carolina

| Team | 1 | 2 | 3 | 4 | Total |
|---|---|---|---|---|---|
| • Flames | 3 | 3 | 6 | 3 | 15 |
| #2 Chanticleers | 0 | 14 | 0 | 0 | 14 |

- Date: November 22
- Location: Brooks Stadium
  Conway, SC
- Game start: 1:00 PM EST
- Game attendance: 8,576
- TV announcers (ESPN3): Mike Hogewood and Mike Gleason

Scoring summary
| 1 | 8:48 | LIB | John Lundsford 32-yard kick good | LIB 3–0 |
| 2 | 10:07 | CCAR | Bruce Mapp 38-yard pass from Alex Ross, Alex Catron kick | CCAR 7–3 |
| 2 | 4:45 | CCAR | DeAngelo Henderson 19-yard run, Alex Catron kick | CCAR 14–3 |
| 2 | 0:03 | LIB | John Lundsford 42-yard kick good | CCAR 14–6 |
| 3 | 2:01 | LIB | Darrin Peterson 72-yard pass from Shephon Masha, two-point conversion failed | CCAR 14–12 |
| 4 | 1:20 | LIB | John Lundsford 32-yard kick good | LIB 15–14 |

In their twelfth game of the season, the Flames won, 15–14, over the Coastal Carolina Chanticleers.

== FCS Playoffs ==
=== @ James Madison ===
Liberty @ James Madison

| Team | 1 | 2 | 3 | 4 | Total |
|---|---|---|---|---|---|
| • #20 Flames | 3 | 7 | 10 | 6 | 26 |
| #15 Dukes | 0 | 21 | 0 | 0 | 21 |

- Date: November 29
- Location: Bridgeforth Stadium
  Harrisonburg, VA
- Game start: 4:00 PM EST
- Game attendance: 13,040
- Television network: ESPN3

Scoring summary
| 1 | 14:52 | LIB | John Lundsford 26-yard kick good | LIB 3–0 |
| 2 | 14:53 | LIB | D.J. Abnar 19-yard run, John Lundsford kick | LIB 10–0 |
| 2 | 14:33 | JMU | Jauan Latney 73-yard run, Ryan Maglio kick | LIB 10–7 |
| 2 | 8:47 | JMU | Vad Lee 9-yard run, Ryan Maglio kick | JMU 14–10 |
| 2 | 2:48 | JMU | DeAndre Smith 16-yard pass from Vad Lee, Ryan Maglio kick | JMU 21–10 |
| 3 | 10:16 | LIB | D.J. Abnar 7-yard run, John Lundsford kick | JMU 21–17 |
| 3 | 4:45 | LIB | John Lunsford 56-yard kick good | JMU 21–20 |
| 4 | 2:53 | LIB | Nicky Fualaau 1-yard run, two-point conversion failed | LIB 26–21 |

In their thirteenth game of the season, the Flames won, 26–21, over the James Madison Dukes in their 2014 FCS First Round playoff game.

=== @ Villanova ===
Liberty @ Villanova

| Team | 1 | 2 | 3 | 4 | Total |
|---|---|---|---|---|---|
| #20 Flames | 10 | 9 | 3 | 0 | 22 |
| • #5 Wildcats | 0 | 14 | 0 | 15 | 29 |

- Date: December 6
- Location: Villanova Stadium
  Villanova, PA
- Game start: 4:30 PM EST
- Game attendance: 3,113
- Television network: ESPN3

Scoring summary
| 1 | 12:11 | LIB | Josh Woodrum 1-yard run, John Lundsford kick | LIB 7–0 |
| 1 | 5:07 | LIB | John Lundsford 50-yard kick good | LIB 10–0 |
| 2 | 9:20 | LIB | John Lundsford 23-yard kick good | LIB 13–0 |
| 2 | 7:29 | VIL | John Robertson 3-yard run, Chris Gough kick | LIB 13–7 |
| 2 | 5:24 | VIL | Austin Medley 1-yard run, Chris Gough kick | VIL 14–13 |
| 2 | 1:31 | LIB | Nick Newman 58-yard fumble return, two-point conversion failed | LIB 19–14 |
| 3 | 5:22 | LIB | John Lundsford 21-yard kick good | LIB 22–14 |
| 4 | 13:17 | VIL | Kevin Guylas 70-yard pass from John Robertson, John Robertson run for two-point conversion | Tied 22–22 |
| 4 | 1:12 | VIL | John Robertson 1-yard run, Chris Gough kick | VIL 29–22 |

In their fourteenth game of the season, the Flames lost, 29–22, to the Villanova Wildcats in their 2014 FCS Second Round playoff game.

== Ranking movements ==
Ranking movements Legend: ██ Increase in ranking ██ Decrease in ranking — = Not ranked RV = Received votes
| | Week | | | | | | | | | | | | | | |
| Poll | Pre | 1 | 2 | 3 | 4 | 5 | 6 | 7 | 8 | 9 | 10 | 11 | 12 | 13 | Final |
|---|---|---|---|---|---|---|---|---|---|---|---|---|---|---|---|
| Sports Network | RV | RV | RV | 24 | 22 | RV | RV | RV | RV | RV | RV | RV | RV | 20 | 17 |
| Coaches | RV | RV | RV | RV | 23 | RV | — | RV | RV | RV | RV | RV | RV | 23 | 17 |
