= 2014 Gardner–Webb Runnin' Bulldogs football team =

American college football season

2014 Gardner–Webb Runnin' Bulldogs football
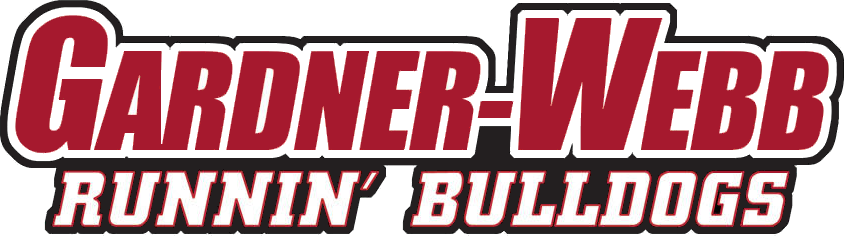
- Conference: Big South Conference
- Record: 4–8 (0–5 Big South)
- Head coach: Carroll McCray (2nd season)
- Defensive coordinator: Randall McCray (2nd season)
- Home stadium: Ernest W. Spangler Stadium

2014 Big South Conference football standings
	Conf.			Overall
Team	W		L	W		L
No. 5 Coastal Carolina +^	4	–	1	12	–	2
No. 17 Liberty +^	4	–	1	9	–	5
Charleston Southern	3	–	2	8	–	4
Presbyterian	3	–	2	6	–	5
Monmouth	1	–	4	6	–	5
Gardner–Webb	0	–	5	4	–	8
+ – Conference co-champions; ^ – FCS playoff participant; Rankings from The Sports Network poll

The 2014 Gardner–Webb Runnin' Bulldogs football team represented Gardner–Webb University as a member of the Big South Conference during the 2014 NCAA Division I FCS football season. Led by second-year head coach Carroll McCray, the Runnin' Bulldogs compiled an overall record of 4–8 with a mark of 0–5 in conference play, placing last out of six teams in the Big South. Gardner–Webb played home games at Ernest W. Spangler Stadium in Boiling Springs, North Carolina.

== Schedule ==
Date	Time	Opponent	Site	TV	Result	Attendance
August 30	7:00 pm	at No. 21 Furman*	Paladin Stadium; Greenville, NC	SDN	L 3–13	7,533
September 6	6:30 pm	at Wake Forest*	BB&T Field; Winston-Salem, NC	ESPN3	L 7–23	26,925
September 13	6:00 pm	Virginia–Lynchburg*	Ernest W. Spangler Stadium; Boiling Springs, NC	BSN	W 34–0	2,593
September 20	6:00 pm	Wofford*	Ernest W. Spangler Stadium; Boiling Springs, NC	BSN	W 43–36	6,450
September 27	6:00 pm	at The Citadel*	Johnson Hagood Stadium; Charleston, SC		L 14–37	8,573
October 4	1:30 pm	Charlotte*^{†}	Ernest W. Spangler Stadium; Boiling Springs, NC	ESPN3	W 27–24	7,892
October 18	1:30 pm	at VMI*	Alumni Memorial Field; Lexington, VA		W 47–41 ^{2OT}	6,624
October 25	3:30 pm	at Liberty	Williams Stadium; Lynchburg, VA	ESPN3	L 0–34	20,217
November 1	3:30 pm	No. 3 Coastal Carolina	Ernest W. Spangler Stadium; Boiling Springs, NC	ASN	L 14–38	1,748
November 8	11:00 am	at Charleston Southern	Buccaneer Field; Charleston, SC	ESPN3	L 14–44	3,629
November 15	12:00 pm	Presbyterian	Ernest W. Spangler Stadium; Boiling Springs, NC	ASN	L 7–14	3,150
November 22	12:00 pm	at Monmouth	Kessler Field; West Long Branch, NJ	ASN	L 15–31	1,513
*Non-conference game; ^{†}Homecoming; Rankings from The Sports Network Poll released prior to the game; All times are in Eastern time
