= 2017–18 Winthrop Eagles women's basketball team =

Intercollegiate basketball season

2017–18 Winthrop Eagles women's basketball
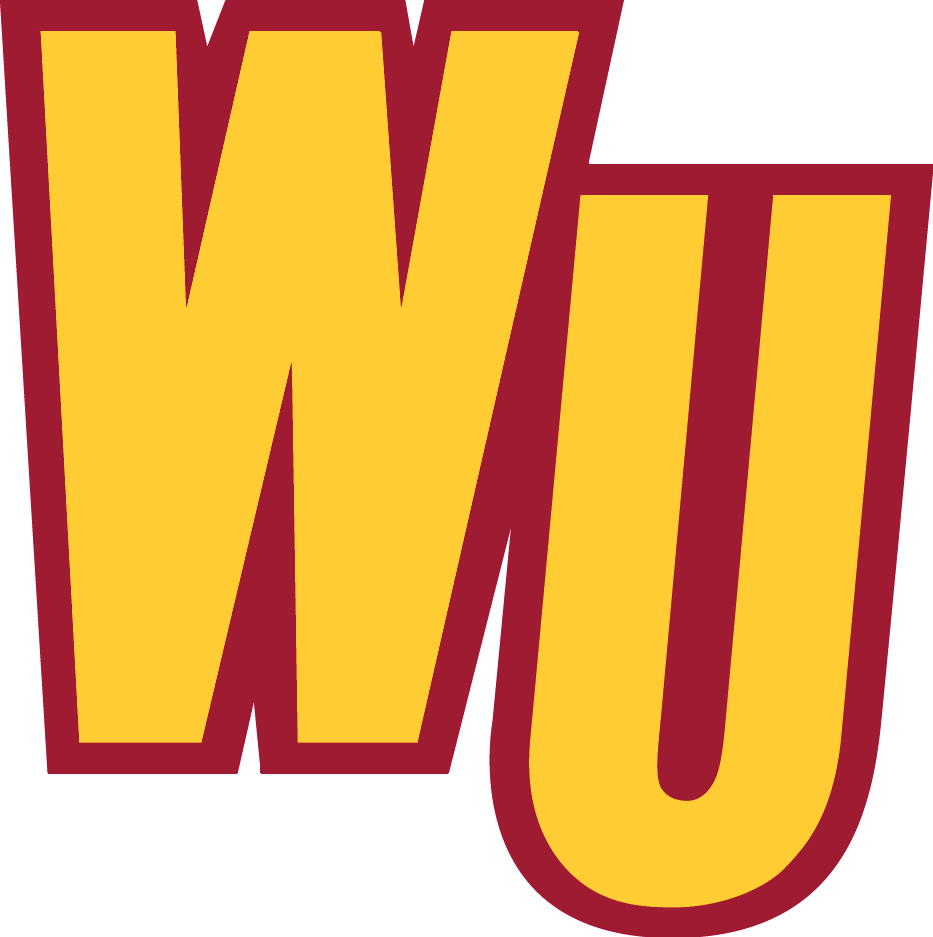
- Conference: Big South Conference
- Record: 3–27 (2–16 Big South)
- Head coach: Lynette Woodard (1st season)
- Assistant coaches: Kevin Lynum; Tesia Harris; Tobias Pinson
- Home arena: Winthrop Coliseum

2017–18 Big South women's basketball standings
	Conf.				Overall
Team	W		L	PCT	W		L	PCT
Liberty †	16	–	2	.889	24	–	10	.706
Radford	15	–	3	.833	24	–	9	.727
UNC Asheville	12	–	6	.667	17	–	16	.515
High Point	10	–	8	.556	17	–	14	.548
Presbyterian	9	–	9	.500	12	–	18	.400
Gardner–Webb	8	–	10	.444	19	–	13	.594
Campbell	8	–	10	.444	15	–	15	.500
Charleston Southern	5	–	13	.278	11	–	20	.355
Longwood	5	–	13	.278	7	–	23	.233
Winthrop	2	–	16	.111	3	–	27	.100
† 2018 Big South tournament winner As of March 17, 2018; Rankings from AP poll

The 2017–18 Winthrop Eagles women's basketball team represented Winthrop University during the 2017–18 NCAA Division I women's basketball season. The Eagles, led by first-year head coach Lynette Woodard, played their home games at the Winthrop Coliseum and were members of the Big South Conference. They finished the season 3–27, 2–16 in Big South play, to finish in last place. They lost in the first round of the Big South women's basketball tournament to Gardner–Webb.

== Roster ==
2017–18 Winthrop Eagles women's basketball team
Players
Coaches

Pos.	#	Name	Height	Year	Previous school	Hometown
G	1	Kayla Brown	5 ft 6 in (1.68 m)	Fr	Cato Middle College	Charlotte, NC
G	2	Wykeria Jones (redshirt)	5 ft 6 in (1.68 m)	Jr	Bethune-Bowman; Columbia International	Bowman, SC
G	3	Airneisha Gamble	5 ft 4 in (1.63 m)	Fr	The Rock School	Gainesville, FL
G	4	Emily Kelley	5 ft 10 in (1.78 m)	Fr	Gilmour Academy	Chagrin Falls, OH
G	10	Miquela Santoro	5 ft 7 in (1.7 m)	So	Clinton Massie	Clarksville, OH
G	12	Noell Kellers	5 ft 6 in (1.68 m)	Jr	Desert Mountain; Trinity Valley College	Scottsdale, AZ
G	14	Samariya Fantt	5 ft 8 in (1.73 m)	Fr	Irmo	Irmo, SC
G	15	Naima Jackson	5 ft 8 in (1.73 m)	Sr	Tucker	Clarkston, GA
G	20	Marissa Cantrell	5 ft 6 in (1.68 m)	So	Westlake	Atlanta, GA
G	21	Anika Riley	5 ft 8 in (1.73 m)	Fr	Davidson Day School	Charlotte, NC
F	23	Ronata Rogers	6 ft 0 in (1.83 m)	RS Sr	Greensboro Day School	Greensboro, NC
G	25	Courtney Hagaman	5 ft 9 in (1.75 m)	Jr	Manasquan; Ocean County	Toms River, NJ
C	30	Uchechi Ufochukwu	6 ft 4 in (1.93 m)	So	Archbishop Carroll	Benin City, Nigeria
F	34	Zaria McBride	6 ft 2 in (1.88 m)	RS Fr	Whitehall Yearling	Whitehall, OH
F	44	Kayla Atkins	6 ft 2 in (1.88 m)	Jr	Westwood	Blythewood, SC
F	55	Angela Coello Perez	6 ft 1 in (1.85 m)	So	Real Club Celta	Vigo, Spain

Head coach

- Lynette Woodard (Kansas)

Assistant coach(es)

- Kevin Lynum (American Military)
- Tesia Harris (St. John's)
- Tobias Pinson (USC Upstate)

Legend

- (C) Team captain
- (S) Suspended
- (I) Ineligible
- (W) Walk-on
- Injured
- Current redshirt

Roster
Last update: August 13, 2024

== Schedule ==
Date time, TV	Rank^{#}	Opponent^{#}	Result	Record	Site (attendance) city, state
Non-conference regular season
November 10, 2017*; 7:00 p.m.		at Elon	L 37–98	0–1	Alumni Gym (794); Elon, NC
November 12, 2017*; 2:00 p.m.		Duquesne	L 54–81	0–2	Winthrop Coliseum (303); Rock Hill, SC
November 15, 2017*; 7:00 p.m.		North Carolina Wesleyan	W 94–50	1–2	Winthrop Coliseum (178); Rock Hill, NC
November 18, 2017*; 1:00 p.m.		South Carolina State	L 37–65	1–3	Winthrop Coliseum (316); Rock Hill, NC
November 28, 2017*; 10:30 a.m., ESPN3		at Akron	L 43–69	1–4	James A. Rhodes Arena (1,450); Akron, OH
November 30, 2017*; 6:00 p.m.		at Marshall	L 40–70	1–5	Cam Henderson Center (515); Huntington, WV
December 3, 2017*; 2:00 p.m.		East Tennessee State	L 63–74	1–6	Winthrop Coliseum (147); Rock Hill, NC
December 9, 2017*; 2:00 p.m.		Wofford	L 68–73	1–7	Winthrop Coliseum (137); Rock Hill, NC
December 10, 2017*; 2:00 p.m., ESPN3		at No. 14 Duke	L 30–101	1–8	Cameron Indoor Stadium (3,332); Durham, NC
December 17, 2017*; 2:00 p.m., ESPN3		at Mercer	L 45–93	1–9	Hawkins Arena (634); Macon, GA
December 19, 2017*; 12:00 p.m.		at Tennessee Tech	L 41–70	1–10	Eblen Center (1,519); Cookeville, TN
Big South regular season
January 2, 2018; 7:00 p.m.		at Radford	L 52–78	1–11 (0–1)	Dedmon Center (471); Radford, VA
January 6, 2018; 2:00 p.m.		Campbell	L 48–72	1–12 (0–2)	Winthrop Coliseum (127); Rock Hill, SC
January 9, 2018; 7:00 p.m.		at Liberty	L 37–63	1–13 (0–3)	Vines Center (1,026); Lynchburg, VA
January 13, 2018; 2:00 p.m.		High Point	L 58–79	1–14 (0–4)	Winthrop Coliseum (137); Rock Hill, SC
January 16, 2018; 7:00 p.m.		at Charleston Southern	L 45–81	1–15 (0–5)	CSU Field House (188); Charleston, SC
January 20, 2018; 2:00 p.m.		UNC Asheville	L 48–70	1–16 (0–6)	Winthrop Coliseum (136); Rock Hill, SC
January 23, 2018; 7:00 p.m.		at Presbyterian	L 48–75	1–17 (0–7)	Templeton Center (256); Clinton, SC
January 27, 2018; 5:00 p.m.		Gardner–Webb	L 59–66	1–18 (0–8)	Winthrop Coliusem (136); Rock Hill, SC
January 30, 2018; 7:00 p.m.		Longwood	W 69–60	2–18 (1–8)	Winthrop Coliusem (137); Rock Hill, SC
February 3, 2018; 2:00 p.m.		at UNC Asheville	L 51–63	2–19 (1–9)	Kimmel Arena (2,608); Asheville, NC
February 6, 2018; 7:00 p.m.		Presbyterian	L 58–64	2–20 (1–10)	Winthrop Coliseum (326); Rock Hill, SC
February 10, 2018; 3:00 p.m.		at Gardner–Webb	L 48–75	2–21 (1–11)	Paul Porter Arena (256); Boiling Springs, NC
February 13, 2018; 7:00 p.m.		at High Point	L 40–77	2–22 (1–12)	Millis Center (401); High Point, NC
February 17, 2018; 7:00 p.m.		Radford	L 30–70	2–23 (1–13)	Winthrop Coliseum (203); Rock Hill, NC
February 20, 2018; 7:00 p.m.		Liberty	L 53–73	2–24 (1–14)	Winthrop Coliseum (176); Rock Hill, SC
February 24, 2018; 2:00 p.m.		at Campbell	L 45–57	2–25 (1–15)	Gore Arena (2,089); Buies Creek, NC
February 27, 2018; 7:00 p.m.		Charleston Southern	W 62–56	3–25 (2–15)	Winthrop Coliseum (228); Rock Hill, SC
March 2, 2018; 7:00 p.m.		at Longwood	W 69–60	3–26 (2–16)	Willett Hall (512); Farmville, VA
Big South tournament
March 8, 2018; 8:00 p.m.	(10)	vs. (7) Gardner–Webb; First round	L 57–68	3–27	Vines Center (643); Lynchburg, VA
*Non-conference game. ^{#}Rankings from AP poll. (#) Tournament seedings in parentheses. All times are in Eastern.

== See also ==
- 2017–18 Winthrop Eagles men's basketball team
