= Providence Friars women's basketball =

Providence College sports

2026–27 Providence Friars women's basketball team
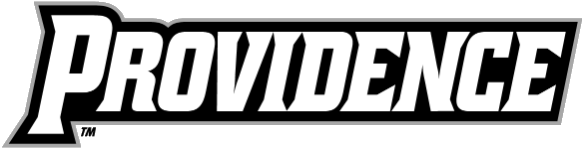
- University: Providence College
- Head coach: Erin Batth (4th season)
- Location: Providence, Rhode Island
- Arena: Alumni Hall (capacity: 1,854)
- Conference: Big East
- Nickname: Friars
- Colors: Black, white, and silver

NCAA Division I tournament Sweet Sixteen
- 1990

NCAA Division I tournament appearances
- 1986, 1989, 1990, 1991, 1992

AIAW tournament second round
- 1980

AIAW tournament appearances
- 1980

Conference tournament champions
- 1990

Conference regular-season champions
- 1983, 1986, 1990

The Providence Friars women's basketball team represents Providence College in Providence, Rhode Island, United States. The school's team competes in the Big East Conference where it has competed since the 1982–83 season. Under coach Kay McDonald, the women’s basketball team began competing in the Association for Intercollegiate Athletics for Women (AIAW) in 1974–75, obtaining a 9–4 record and its first winning season.

== Year by year results ==
Record table
Season	Coach	Overall	Conference	Standing	Postseason
Kay McDonald (1974–1976)
1974–75	Kay McDonald	9–4			
1975–76	Kay McDonald	16–3			
Kay McDonald:		25–7 (.781)			
Tim Gilbride (1976–1980)
1976–77	Tim Gilbride	18–6			
1977–78	Tim Gilbride	21–5			
1978–79	Tim Gilbride	21–9			
1979–80	Tim Gilbride	22–7			AIAW second round
Tim Gilbride:		82–27 (.752)			
Joe Mullaney, Jr (1980–1983)
1980–81	Joe Mullaney, Jr.	17–12			
1981–82	Joe Mullaney, Jr.	25–9			
Big East Conference (1982–present)
1982–83	Joe Mullaney, Jr.	24–6	7–1	T-1st	
Joe Mullaney, Jr.:		66–27 (.710)	7–1 (.875)		
Lynn Sheedy (1983–1985)
1983–84	Lynn Sheedy	19–7	5–3	T-3rd	
1984–85	Lynn Sheedy	14–14	9–7	6th	
Lynn Sheedy:		33–21 (.611)	14–10 (.583)		
Bob Foley (1985–1996)
1985–86	Bob Foley	24–6	14–2	1st	NCAA Round of 40
1986–87	Bob Foley	23–9	12–4	2nd	NWIT 4th Place
1987–88	Bob Foley	13–15	7–9	6th	
1988–89	Bob Foley	22–11	10–6	3rd	NCAA Round of 48
1989–90	Bob Foley	27–5	14–2	T-1st	NCAA Sweet Sixteen
1990–91	Bob Foley	26–6	13–3	2nd	NCAA Round of 32
1991–92	Bob Foley	21–9	13–5	T-3rd	NCAA Round of 48
1992–93	Bob Foley	15–15	7–11	7th	
1993–94	Bob Foley	13-15	10–8	4th	
1994–95	Bob Foley	10-21	5–13	T-8th	
1995–96	Bob Foley	12–15	9–9	T-4th (T-1st BE7)	
Bob Foley:		206–127 (.619)	114–72 (.613)		
Jim Jabir (1996–2002)
1996–97	Jim Jabir	13–14	8–10	T-6th (T-2nd BE7)	
1997–98	Jim Jabir	10–17	6–12	T-9th (T-4th BE7)	
1998–99	Jim Jabir	5–22	4–14	11th	
1999–00	Jim Jabir	10–17	5–11	T-9th	
2000–01	Jim Jabir	10–17	4–12	11th	
2001–02	Jim Jabir	13–15	7–9	8th	
Jim Jabir:		62–102 (.378)	34–68 (.333)		
Susan Yow (2002–2005)
2002–03	Susan Yow	9–18	3–13	13th	
2003–04	Susan Yow	4–23	0–16	14th	
2004–05	Susan Yow	1–27	0–16	12th	
Susan Yow:		14–68 (.171)	3–45 (.063)		
Phil Seymore (2005–2012)
2005–06	Phil Seymore	8–19	3–13	T-13th	
2006–07	Phil Seymore	13–16	3–13	T-13th	
2007–08	Phil Seymore	12–17	2–14	16th	
2008–09	Phil Seymore	10–20	4–12	T-13th	
2009–10	Phil Seymore	19–15	7–9	T-8th	WNIT Quarterfinals
2010–11	Phil Seymore	13–16	6–10	11th	
2011–12	Phil Seymore	13–17	5–11	13th	
Phil Seymore:		88–120 (.423)	30–82 (.268)		
Susan Robinson Fruchtl (2012–2016)
2012–13	Susan Robinson Fruchtl	7–23	2–14	14th	
2013–14	Susan Robinson Fruchtl	7–23	2–16	10th	
2014–15	Susan Robinson Fruchtl	6–24	3–15	9th	
2015–16	Susan Robinson Fruchtl	5–24	1–17	10th	
Susan Robinson Fruchtl:		25–94 (.210)	8–62 (.114)		
Jim Crowley (2017–2023)
2016–17	Jim Crowley	12–18	4–14	T-7th	
2017–18	Jim Crowley	10–21	3–15	T-9th	
2018–19	Jim Crowley	19–16	8–10	T–6th	WNIT Third Round
2019–20	Jim Crowley	13–19	3–15	8th	
2020–21	Jim Crowley	7–14	4–10	7th	
2021–22	Jim Crowley	11–19	6–14	8th	
2022–23	Jim Crowley	13–18	4–16	10th	
Jim Crowley:		85–125 (.405)	32–94 (.254)		
Erin Batth (2023–present)
2023–24	Erin Batth	13-21	6-12	T-8th	
2024-25	Erin Batth	13–19	6-12	7th	
Total:		686–718 (.489)			
National champion Postseason invitational champion Conference regular season champion Conference regular season and conference tournament champion Division regular season champion Division regular season and conference tournament champion Conference tournament champion

== Postseason results ==
=== NCAA Division I ===
Year	Seed	Round	Opponent	Result
1986	#9	First Round	#8 James Madison	L 53-55
1989	#11	First Round	#6 James Madison	L 74-94
1990	#3	Second Round; Sweet Sixteen	#6 Maryland #2 Virginia	W 77-75; L 71-77
1991	#5	First Round; Second Round	#12 Fairfield #4 Clemson	W 88-87; L 91-103
1992	#7	First Round	#10 Toledo	L 64-74

=== AIAW Division I ===
The Friars made one appearance in the AIAW National Division I basketball tournament, with a combined record of 0–1.

Year	Round	Opponent	Result
1980	Second Round	Rutgers	L, 54–70

== Roster ==
2026–27 Providence Friars women's basketball team
Players
Coaches

Pos.	#	Name	Height	Year	Previous school	Hometown
G	1	Mariana Padilla	5 ft 5 in (1.65 m)	Jr	Dexter Southfield	Newton, MA
G	2	Princess Moody	5 ft 8 in (1.73 m)	So	Bishop McNamara	La Plata, MD
G	3	Orlagh Gormley	5 ft 6 in (1.68 m)	Jr	Dexter Southfield	Quincy, MA
G	4	Kylah Silver	5 ft 10 in (1.78 m)	RS Jr	UNC Wilmington	Greenville, NC
F/C	5	J'Adora Young	6 ft 4 in (1.93 m)	RS Jr	Ole Miss	Mauldin, SC
G	8	Taylor Barner	5 ft 9 in (1.75 m)	So	East Carolina	Cary, NC
G/F	10	Audrey Shields	6 ft 1 in (1.85 m)	Jr	Emma Willard	Troy, NY
G	11	Riley Hamburger	6 ft 0 in (1.83 m)	So	Paul VI	Aldie, VA
G	12	Olivia Rodrigues	6 ft 1 in (1.85 m)	RS Fr	Tabor Academy	New Bedford, MA
G	13	Daviane Mindoudi	6 ft 1 in (1.85 m)	Jr	Florida	Bilbao, Spain
G	21	Payton Dunbar	5 ft 11 in (1.8 m)	Jr	Virginia	Narrows, VA
F	23	Ashley Dinges	6 ft 1 in (1.85 m)	So	Noble and Greenough	Haverhill, MA
F	32	Voldie Basana	6 ft 2 in (1.88 m)	Fr	Athens Christian	Kinshasa, DRC
G	33	Sophi Hall	6 ft 1 in (1.85 m)	Sr	Holy Family	Carver, MN
C	55	Marlene Mbilima	6 ft 3 in (1.91 m)	Fr	Athens Christian	Kinshasa, DRC

Head coach

- Erin Batth (Clemson)

Assistant coach(es)

- Valerie Nainima (South Carolina)
- Molly Reagan (Liberty)
- Sharon Baldwin (Georgia)
- Elissa Cunane (NC State)

Legend

- (C) Team captain
- (S) Suspended
- (I) Ineligible
- (W) Walk-on
- Injured
- Current redshirt

Roster
Last update: September 6, 2026
