= 2014 Presbyterian Blue Hose football team =

American college football season

2014 Presbyterian Blue Hose football
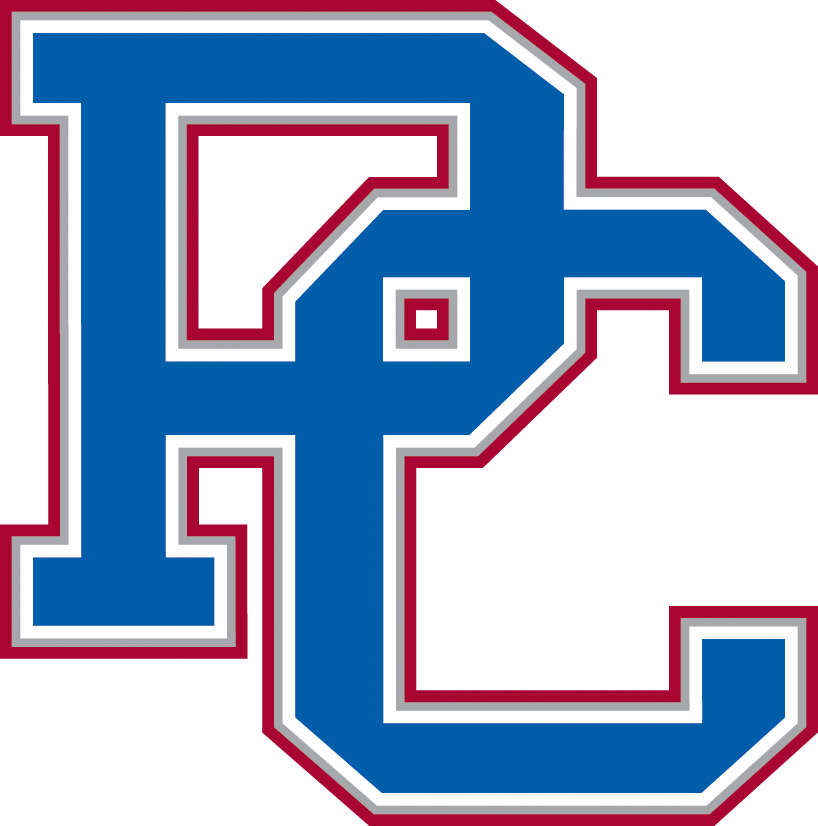
- Conference: Big South Conference
- Record: 6–5 (3–2 Big South)
- Head coach: Harold Nichols (6th season)
- Offensive coordinator: Todd Varn
- Defensive coordinator: Tommy Spangler
- Home stadium: Bailey Memorial Stadium

2014 Big South Conference football standings
	Conf.			Overall
Team	W		L	W		L
No. 5 Coastal Carolina +^	4	–	1	12	–	2
No. 17 Liberty +^	4	–	1	9	–	5
Charleston Southern	3	–	2	8	–	4
Presbyterian	3	–	2	6	–	5
Monmouth	1	–	4	6	–	5
Gardner–Webb	0	–	5	4	–	8
+ – Conference co-champions; ^ – FCS playoff participant; Rankings from The Sports Network poll

The 2014 Presbyterian Blue Hose football team represented Presbyterian College in the 2014 NCAA Division I FCS football season. They were led by sixth-year head coach Harold Nichols and played their home games at Bailey Memorial Stadium. They were a member of the Big South Conference. They finished the season 6–5, 3–2 in Big South play, to finish in a tie for third place.

== Schedule ==
Date	Time	Opponent	Site	TV	Result	Attendance
August 28	7:00 pm	at Northern Illinois*	Huskie Stadium; DeKalb, IL	ESPN3	L 3–55	12,398
September 6	7:00 pm	Bluefield*	Bailey Memorial Stadium; Clinton, SC		W 69–14	5,089
September 13	7:00 pm	No. 12 Furman*	Bailey Memorial Stadium; Clinton, SC	WMYA	W 10–7	2,321
September 20	6:00 pm	at NC State*	Carter–Finley Stadium; Raleigh, NC	ESPN3	L 0–42	54,408
October 4	2:00 pm	Western Carolina*	Bailey Memorial Stadium; Clinton, SC	BSN	W 19–14	4,007
October 11	2:00 pm	No. 3 Coastal Carolina	Bailey Memorial Stadium; Clinton, SC	ESPN3	L 28–40	3,073
October 18	3:00 pm	at No. 23 Charleston Southern	Buccaneer Field; Charleston, SC	ESPN3	W 7–3	4,083
October 25	2:00 pm	Monmouth^{†}	Bailey Memorial Stadium; Clinton, SC	BSN	W 18–12	4,211
November 1	2:00 pm	Liberty	Bailey Memorial Stadium; Clinton, SC	BSN	L 7–28	2,691
November 8	12:00 pm	at No. 12 (FBS) Ole Miss*	Vaught–Hemingway Stadium; Oxford, MS	SECN	L 0–48	60,546
November 15	12:00 pm	at Gardner–Webb	Ernest W. Spangler Stadium; Boiling Springs, NC	ASN	W 14–7	3,150
*Non-conference game; ^{†}Homecoming; Rankings from The Sports Network Poll released prior to the game; All times are in Eastern time

- Source: Schedule
