= DeUnna Hendrix =

American basketball player and former coach

Biographical details
- Born: October 27, 1984 (age 42)
- Education: University of Richmond

Playing career
- 2003–2007: Richmond
- 2008: Jacksonville Cougars

Coaching career (HC unless noted)
- 2007–2011: Jacksonville (asst.)
- 2011–2012: High Point (asst.)
- 2012–2019: High Point
- 2019–2023: Miami (OH)

Head coaching record
- Overall: 160–173 (.480)

DeUnna Hendrix is an American women's basketball former coach and former basketball player. She previously served as the women's basketball head coach at Miami University. Prior to that, she served as the women's basketball head coach at High Point University.

== Early life and education ==
Hendrix is from Kokomo, Indiana. She attended the University of Richmond where she played college basketball. Hendrix was twice named team captain and played in the 2005 NCAA tournament and 2006 WNIT Semi-Finals. While at Richmond, she earned a bachelor's degree in rhetoric and communications. Hendrix played basketball professionally in the Women's Blue Chip Basketball League with the Jacksonville Cougars in 2008.

== Coaching career ==
Hendrix began her coaching career in women's basketball at Jacksonville as an assistant under Jill Dunn from 2007 to 2011.

=== High Point ===
In 2011, Hendrix moved to High Point as an assistant for one season. In 2012, she was promoted to head coach. In seven seasons at High Point, Hendrix compiled a 125–93 record. Her 2013–14 team won 22 games and was 16–4 in the Big South to capture the regular season title. Hendrix was named Big South Coach of the year. She took the Panthers to the WNIT in 2014 and 2019.

=== Miami (Ohio) ===
Hendrix took over as the head coach at Miami on April 24, 2019. On April 26, 2023, she resigned after four seasons, having posted a 35–80 record at Miami, after text messages led to allegations that she was in a relationship with a player. Her 18–58 Mid-American Conference record was one of the worst in MAC history.

== Head coaching record ==
Record table
Season	Team	Overall	Conference	Standing	Postseason
High Point (Big South Conference) (2011–2019)
2012–13	High Point	17–13	11–7	T-4th	
2013–14	High Point	22–11	16–4	1st	WNIT First Round
2014–15	High Point	20–12	14–6	2nd	
2015–16	High Point	12–19	10–10	6th	
2016–17	High Point	15–15	13–5	T-2nd	
2017–18	High Point	17–14	10–8	4th	
2018–19	High Point	22–9	15–3	2nd	WNIT First Round
High Point:		125–93 (.573)	89–43 (.674)		
Miami (Mid-American Conference) (2019–2023)
2019–20	Miami	11–20	4–14	5th (East)	
2020–21	Miami	4–20	3–17	12th	
2021–22	Miami	8–21	4–16	T-10th	
2022–23	Miami	12–19	7–11	T-7th	
Miami:		35–80 (.304)	18–58 (.237)		
Total:		160–173 (.480)			
National champion Postseason invitational champion Conference regular season champion Conference regular season and conference tournament champion Division regular season champion Division regular season and conference tournament champion Conference tournament champion
