= 2014 Monmouth Hawks football team =

American college football season

2014 Monmouth Hawks football
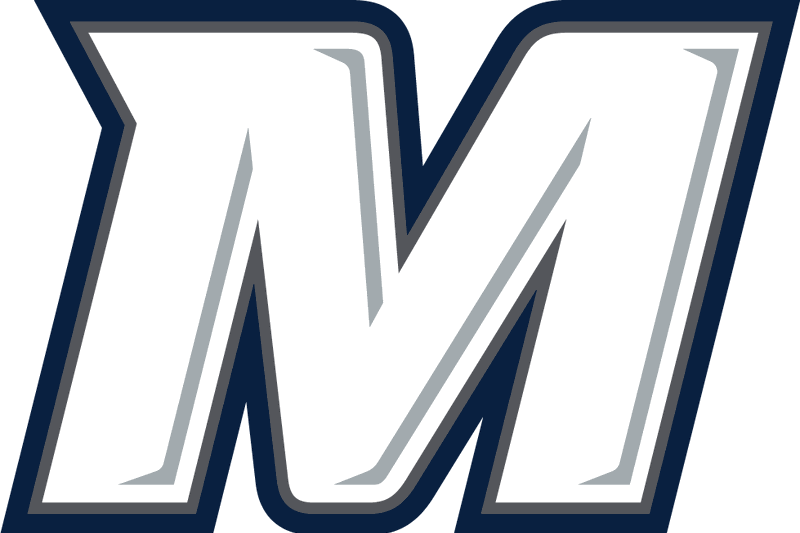
- Conference: Big South Conference
- Record: 6–5 (1–4 Big South)
- Head coach: Kevin Callahan (22nd season)
- Offensive coordinator: Kevin Morris (1st season)
- Offensive scheme: Pro-style
- Defensive coordinator: Andy Bobik (21st season)
- Base defense: 4–3
- Home stadium: Kessler Field

2014 Big South Conference football standings
	Conf.			Overall
Team	W		L	W		L
No. 5 Coastal Carolina +^	4	–	1	12	–	2
No. 17 Liberty +^	4	–	1	9	–	5
Charleston Southern	3	–	2	8	–	4
Presbyterian	3	–	2	6	–	5
Monmouth	1	–	4	6	–	5
Gardner–Webb	0	–	5	4	–	8
+ – Conference co-champions; ^ – FCS playoff participant; Rankings from The Sports Network poll

The 2014 Monmouth Hawks football team represented Monmouth University in the 2014 NCAA Division I FCS football season. They were led by 22nd-year head coach Kevin Callahan and played their home games at Kessler Field. After playing one season as in independent in 2013, they were first year members of the Big South Conference in 2014. Monmouth finished the season 6–5 overall and 1–4 in Big South play to place fifth.

== Schedule ==
Date	Time	Opponent	Site	TV	Result	Attendance
August 30	1:00 p.m.	Delaware State*	Kessler Field; West Long Banch, NJ		W 52–21	2,150
September 13	1:00 p.m.	Wagner*	Kessler Field; West Long Banch, NJ		W 21–16	2,421
September 20	1:00 p.m.	at Duquesne*	Arthur J. Rooney Athletic Field; Pittsburgh, PA		L 21–30	1,287
September 27	12:30 p.m.	at Lehigh*	Goodman Stadium; Bethlehem, PA		W 28–21	5,633
October 4	1:00 p.m.	at Robert Morris*	Joe Walton Stadium; Moon Township, PA		W 51–20	2,056
October 11	1:00 p.m.	Columbia*^{†}	Kessler Field; West Long Branch, NJ		W 61–28	2,627
October 25	2:00 p.m.	at Presbyterian	Bailey Memorial Stadium; Clinton, SC	BSN	L 12–18	4,211
November 1	1:00 p.m.	Charleston Southern	Kessler Field; West Long Branch, NJ	ESPN3	L 0–27	450
November 8	3:30 p.m.	at Liberty	Williams Stadium; Lynchburg, VA	ASN	L 24–34	16,053
November 15	3:00 p.m.	at No. 2 Coastal Carolina	Brooks Stadium; Conway, SC	ESPN3	L 21–55	8,343
November 22	12:00 p.m.	Gardner–Webb	Kessler Field; West Long Branch, NJ	ASN	W 31–15	1,513
*Non-conference game; ^{†}Homecoming; Rankings from The Sports Network Poll released prior to the game; All times are in Eastern time
