= 2018 Big South Conference women's basketball tournament =

- Classification: Division I
- Season: 2017–18
- Teams: 10
- Site: Vines Center; Lynchburg, Virginia
- Champions: Liberty (17th title)
- Winning coach: Carey Green (14th title)
- MVP: KK Barbour (Liberty)
- Attendance: 4,610

2017–18 Big South women's basketball standings
	Conf.				Overall
Team	W		L	PCT	W		L	PCT
Liberty †	16	–	2	.889	24	–	10	.706
Radford	15	–	3	.833	24	–	9	.727
UNC Asheville	12	–	6	.667	17	–	16	.515
High Point	10	–	8	.556	17	–	14	.548
Presbyterian	9	–	9	.500	12	–	18	.400
Gardner–Webb	8	–	10	.444	19	–	13	.594
Campbell	8	–	10	.444	15	–	15	.500
Charleston Southern	5	–	13	.278	11	–	20	.355
Longwood	5	–	13	.278	7	–	23	.233
Winthrop	2	–	16	.111	3	–	27	.100
† 2018 Big South tournament winner As of March 17, 2018; Rankings from AP poll

The 2018 Big South women's basketball tournament was the postseason women's basketball tournament for the Big South Conference that took place March 8–11, 2018, at the Vines Center in Lynchburg, Virginia. The first round will be broadcast on the Big South Network and Roku, with all remaining games streamed on ESPN3. Liberty, the winner of the Big South tournament, earned an automatic bid to the NCAA women's tournament.

== Format ==
All ten teams were eligible for the tournament. Seeding was determined based on regular season record and a tiebreaker system if necessary. The top six teams received a bye into the second round while the bottom 4 teams played in the first round. The top two teams played the two winners of the first round games.

== Seeds ==
Seed	School	Conference	Overall	Tiebreaker
1	Liberty	16–2	21–9	
2	Radford	15–3	22–7	
3	UNC-Asheville	12–6	15–14	
4	High Point	10–8	16–13	
5	Presbyterian	9–9	12–17	
6	Campbell	8–10	15–14	2–0 vs. GW
7	Gardner-Webb	8–10	18–12	0–2 vs. Campbell
8	Charleston Southern	5–13	10–19	2–0 vs. Longwood
9	Longwood	5–13	7–22	0–2 vs. CSU
10	Winthrop	2–16	3–26	
‡ – Big South regular season champion. Overall records are as of the end of the regular season.

== Schedule ==
Session	Game	Time*	Matchup^{#}	Television	Attendance
First round - Thursday, March 8
1	1	6:00 pm	#8 Charleston Southern vs. #9 Longwood	BSN	643
1	2	8:00 pm	#7 Gardner–Webb vs. #10 Winthrop	BSN	643
Quarterfinals - Friday, March 9
2	3	12:00 pm	#1 Liberty vs. #8 Charleston Southern	ESPN3	850
2	4	2:00 pm	#4 High Point vs. #5 Presbyterian	ESPN3	850
3	5	6:00 pm	#2 Radford vs. #7 Gardner–Webb	ESPN3	843
3	6	8:00 pm	#3 UNC Asheville vs. #6 Campbell	ESPN3	843
Semifinals - Saturday, March 10
4	7	2:00 pm	#1 Liberty vs. #4 High Point	ESPN3	1,197
4	8	4:00 pm	#2 Radford vs. #3 UNC Asheville	ESPN3	1,197
Championship Game - Sunday, March 11
5	9	2:00 pm	#1 Liberty vs. #3 UNC Asheville	ESPN3	1,077

*Game times in Eastern Time. #Rankings denote tournament seeding.

== Bracket ==
First round March 8, 2018
8	Charleston Southern	72
9	Longwood	62
7	Gardner–Webb	68
10	Winthrop	57

Quarterfinals; March 9, 2018
1	Liberty	80
8	Charleston Southern	53
4	High Point	62
5	Presbyterian	60
2	Radford	53
7	Gardner–Webb	51
3	UNC Asheville	47
6	Campbell	42

Semifinals; March 10, 2018
1	Liberty	78
4	High Point	54
2	Radford	50
3	UNC Asheville	60

Championship; March 11, 2018
1	Liberty	60
3	UNC Asheville	42

== See also ==
- 2018 Big South Conference men's basketball tournament
