= 2014 Charleston Southern Buccaneers football team =

American college football season

2014 Charleston Southern Buccaneers football
- Conference: Big South Conference
- Record: 8–4 (3–2 Big South)
- Head coach: Jamey Chadwell (2nd season)
- Offensive coordinator: Gabe Giardina (2nd season)
- Defensive coordinator: Chad Staggs (2nd season)
- Home stadium: Buccaneer Field

2014 Big South Conference football standings
	Conf.			Overall
Team	W		L	W		L
No. 5 Coastal Carolina +^	4	–	1	12	–	2
No. 17 Liberty +^	4	–	1	9	–	5
Charleston Southern	3	–	2	8	–	4
Presbyterian	3	–	2	6	–	5
Monmouth	1	–	4	6	–	5
Gardner–Webb	0	–	5	4	–	8
+ – Conference co-champions; ^ – FCS playoff participant; Rankings from The Sports Network poll

The 2014 Charleston Southern Buccaneers football team represented Charleston Southern University as a member of the Big South Conference during the 2014 NCAA Division I FCS football season. Led by second-year head coach Jamey Chadwell, the Buccaneers compiled an overall record of 8–4 with a mark of 3–2 in conference play, tying for third place in the Big South. Charleston Southern played home games at Buccaneer Field in Charleston, South Carolina.

== Schedule ==
Date	Time	Opponent	Rank	Site	TV	Result	Attendance
August 28	7:30 pm	Point*		Buccaneer Field; Charleston, SC	BSN	W 61–9	3,759
September 6	6:00 pm	Newberry*		Buccaneer Field; Charleston, SC		W 16–10	3,914
September 11	7:00 pm	Campbell*		Buccaneer Field; Charleston, SC	BSN	W 34–10	2,636
September 20	6:00 pm	The Citadel*		Buccaneer Field; Charleston, SC	BSN	W 20–18	7,954
September 27	12:00 pm	at Charlotte*		Jerry Richardson Stadium; Charlotte, NC		W 47–41 ^{OT}	14,498
October 11	7:30 pm	at Vanderbilt*	No. 24	Vanderbilt Stadium; Nashville, TN	SECRN	L 20–21	26,738
October 18	3:00 pm	Presbyterian^{†}	No. 23	Buccaneer Field; Charleston, SC	ESPN3	L 3–7	4,083
October 25	3:30 pm	at No. 4 Coastal Carolina		Brooks Stadium; Conway, SC	ASN	L 22–43	10,194
November 1	1:00 pm	at Monmouth		Kessler Field; West Long Branch, NJ	ESPN3	W 27–0	450
November 8	11:00 am	Gardner–Webb		Buccaneer Field; Charleston, SC	ESPN3	W 44–14	3,629
November 15	3:30 pm	at Liberty		Williams Stadium; Lynchburg, VA	BSN	W 38–36	12,362
November 22	12:00 pm	at No. 9 (FBS) Georgia*		Sanford Stadium; Athens, GA	SECN	L 9–55	92,746
*Non-conference game; ^{†}Homecoming; Rankings from The Sports Network Poll released prior to the game; All times are in Eastern time

== Ranking movements ==
Ranking movements Legend: ██ Increase in ranking ██ Decrease in ranking — = Not ranked RV = Received votes
	Week														
Poll	Pre	1	2	3	4	5	6	7	8	9	10	11	12	13	Final
Sports Network	RV	RV	RV	RV	RV	RV	24	23	RV	RV	RV	RV	RV	RV	RV
Coaches	RV	RV	RV	RV	25	24	23	22	RV	RV	—	RV	RV	RV	RV
