= 2017–18 High Point Panthers women's basketball team =

Intercollegiate basketball season

2017–18 High Point Panthers women's basketball
- Conference: Big South Conference
- Record: 17–14 (10–8 Big South)
- Head coach: DeUnna Hendrix (6th season)
- Assistant coaches: Heather Kearney; Jenna Burkett; Hailey Yohn
- Home arena: Millis Athletic Center

2017–18 Big South women's basketball standings
	Conf.				Overall
Team	W		L	PCT	W		L	PCT
Liberty †	16	–	2	.889	24	–	10	.706
Radford	15	–	3	.833	24	–	9	.727
UNC Asheville	12	–	6	.667	17	–	16	.515
High Point	10	–	8	.556	17	–	14	.548
Presbyterian	9	–	9	.500	12	–	18	.400
Gardner–Webb	8	–	10	.444	19	–	13	.594
Campbell	8	–	10	.444	15	–	15	.500
Charleston Southern	5	–	13	.278	11	–	20	.355
Longwood	5	–	13	.278	7	–	23	.233
Winthrop	2	–	16	.111	3	–	27	.100
† 2018 Big South tournament winner As of March 17, 2018; Rankings from AP poll

The 2017–18 High Point Panthers women's basketball team represented High Point University during the 2017–18 NCAA Division I women's basketball season. The Panthers, led by sixth-year head coach DeUnna Hendrix, played their home games at the Millis Athletic Convocation Center as members of the Big South Conference. They finished the season 17–14, 10–8 in Big South play, to finish in fourth place. They advanced to the semifinals of the Big South women's tournament where they lost to Liberty.

== Previous season ==
The 2016–17 team finished the season 15–15, 13–5 in Big South play, to finish in third place. They lost 55–48 in the quarterfinals of the Big South tournament to Presbyterian.

== Off-season ==
=== Departures ===
Name	Number	Pos.	Height	Year	Hometown
Kyrie Chandler	13	G	5'6"	Sophomore	Powder Springs, GA
Kaylah Keys	3	G	5'5"	Senior	Memphis, TN
Carol-Anne Obusek	33	F	6'3"	Freshman	Cary, NC

=== Recruits ===
College recruiting information
Name	Hometown	School	Height	Weight	Commit date
Kayla Stephens; G	Jacksonville, NC	Northside	5 ft 6 in (1.68 m)	N/A	
Kayla Stephens; G	Recruit ratings: No ratings found				
Jiselle Thomas; G	Norwalk, OH	Norwalk	5 ft 9 in (1.75 m)	N/A	
Jiselle Thomas; G	Recruit ratings: No ratings found				
Overall recruit ranking:
Note: In many cases, Scout, Rivals, 247Sports, On3, and ESPN may conflict in their listings of height and weight.; In these cases, the average was taken. ESPN grades are on a 100-point scale.; Sources: "2017 Player Commits". ESPN. Archived from the original on December 23, 2017.

== Roster ==
2017–18 High Point Panthers women's basketball team
Players
Coaches

Pos.	#	Name	Height	Year	Previous school	Hometown
F	0	Haleigh Hatfield (redshirt)	6 ft 1 in (1.85 m)	Jr	Mount Tabor	Winston-Salem, NC
G	1	Kat Harris	5 ft 7 in (1.7 m)	Sr	New Hope Christian	Charlotte, NC
G	2	Camryn Brown (C)	5 ft 5 in (1.65 m)	So	Revere	Copley, OH
G	4	Bre Davis (redshirt)	5 ft 6 in (1.68 m)	Sr	Seventy-First	Fayetteville, NC
G	5	Hunter Fleming	5 ft 7 in (1.7 m)	Sr	RJ Reynolds	Kernersville, NC
G	10	Emma Bockrath	5 ft 10 in (1.78 m)	Jr	Kettering Alter	Dayton, OH
F	11	Taylor McGlashan	6 ft 2 in (1.88 m)	Jr	Cherokee	Marlton, New Jersey
F	14	Shea Morgan	6 ft 0 in (1.83 m)	Jr	Fairmont	Kettering, OH
G	21	Lindsey Edwards	5 ft 10 in (1.78 m)	Jr	Roland Park	Perry Hall, MD
F	24	Kennedy Currie	6 ft 0 in (1.83 m)	RS Jr	Dudley	Greensboro, NC
G	30	Jiselle Thomas (injured)	5 ft 9 in (1.75 m)	Fr	Norwalk	Norwalk, OH
F	40	Olivia VanSlooten	6 ft 3 in (1.91 m)	So	Ottawa Hills	Toledo, OH

Head coach

- DeUnna Hendrix (Richmond)

Assistant coach(es)

- Heather Kearney (Slippery Rock)
- Jenna Burkett (Robert Morris)
- Hailey Yohn (Coker)

Legend

- (C) Team captain
- (S) Suspended
- (I) Ineligible
- (W) Walk-on
- Injured
- Current redshirt

Roster
Last update: August 11, 2024

== Media ==
All Panthers home games and Big South games, excepting the Gardner–Webb road game, was televised on the Big South Network. In addition, the road games against Ohio, Duke, Stetson and Virginia Tech were televised on ESPN3, the Norfolk State game was televised on Spartan Showcase Video, and the UNC Greensboro game was televised on SoCon Digital Network.

== Schedule and results ==
Date time, TV	Rank^{#}	Opponent^{#}	Result	Record	High points	High rebounds	High assists	Site (attendance) city, state
Non-conference regular season
November 10, 2017*; 5:00 p.m., BSN		North Carolina Wesleyan	W 111–54	1–0	20 – Thomas	12 – Bockrath	6 – Morgan	Millis Athletic Center (635); High Point, NC
November 12, 2017*; 2:00 p.m., ESPN3		at Ohio	L 61–64	1–1	17 – 2 tied	14 – Morgan	5 – Morgan	Convocation Center (370); Athens, OH
November 16, 2017*; 7:00 p.m., ESPN3		at No. 11 Duke	L 50–77	1–2	21 – Bockrath	10 – Bockrath	3 – Harris	Cameron Indoor Stadium (3,121); Durham, NC
November 21, 2017*; 5:00 p.m., BSN		Barton	W 82–69	2–2	25 – Harris	9 – Currie	5 – Brown	Millis Center (487); High Point, NC
November 27, 2017*; 7:00 p.m., ESPN3		at Stetson	W 69–64	3–2	24 – Brown	10 – Currie	5 – Bockrath	Edmunds Center (345); DeLand, FL
November 29, 2017*; 5:30 p.m., Spartan SV		at Norfolk State	W 59-56	4–2	14 – Bockrath	7 – 2 tied	5 – Brown	Echols Hall (1,218); Norfolk, VA
December 3, 2017*; 12:00 p.m., BSN		UAB	L 61–77	4–3	29 – Harris	9 – Currie	4 – Brown	Millis Center (602); High Point, NC
December 16, 2017*; 6:00 p.m., ESPN3		at Virginia Tech	L 63–86	4–4	20 – Morgan	13 – Currie	6 – Brown	Cassell Coliseum (2,177); Blacksburg, VA
December 18, 2017*; 7:00 p.m., BSN		Davidson	L 74–82	4–5	21 – Brown	9 – Currie	4 – Bockrath	Millis Center (504); High Point, NC
December 22, 2017*; 5:00 p.m., BSN		Western Carolina	W 75–69	5–5	17 – Bockrath	7 – Bockrath	4 – Bockrath	Millis Center (458); High Point, NC
December 28, 2017*; 7:00 p.m., SoCon DM		at UNC Greensboro	W 81–72	6–5	28 – Brown	7 – Brown	5 – Brown	Fleming Gymnasium (371); Greensboro, NC
Big South regular season
January 2, 2018; 7:00 p.m., BSN		Gardner–Webb	W 83–80 ^{OT}	7–5 (1–0)	18 – Harris	10 – Morgan	8 – Brown	Millis Center (455); High Point, NC
January 6, 2018; 2:00 p.m., BSN		at UNC Asheville	W 58–45	8–5 (2–0)	15 – Thomas	8 – Bockrath	4 – Morgan	Kimmel Arena (805); Asheville, NC
January 9, 2018; 7:00 p.m., BSN		Presbyterian	W 81–55	9–5 (3–0)	23 – Bockrath	8 – Bockrath	5 – Brown	Millis Center (468); High Point, NC
January 13, 2018; 2:00 p.m., BSN		at Winthrop	W 79–58	10–5 (4–0)	25 – Bockrath	10 – Currie	4 – tied	Winthrop Coliseum (137); Rock Hill, SC
January 16, 2018; 7:00 p.m., BSN		at Campbell	W 62–53	11–5 (5–0)	16 – Harris	8 – Currie	3 – tied	Pope Center (882); Buies Creek, NC
January 20, 2018; 2:00 p.m., BSN		Longwood	W 62–41	12–5 (6–0)	15 – Bockrath	6 – Bockrath	3 – Bockrath	Millis Center (467); High Point, NC
January 23, 2018; 7:00 p.m., BSN		at Radford	L 47–50	12–6 (6–1)	12 – Brown	7 – Bockrath	4 – Bockrath	Dedmon Center (681); Radford, VA
January 27, 2018; 3:00 p.m., BSN		at Charleston Southern	W 75–74	13–6 (7–1)	25 – Bockrath	8 – Morgan	6 – Brown	CSU Field House (275); North Charleston, SC
January 30, 2018; 7:00 p.m., BSN		Liberty	L 42–65	13–7 (7–2)	12 – Thomas	5 – 2 tied	2 – 2 tied	Millis Center (567); High Point, NC
February 3, 2018; 4:00 p.m., BSN		Campbell	L 44–51	13–8 (7–3)	12 – Bockrath	9 – Bockrath	3 – Bockrath	Millis Center (547); High Point, NC
February 6, 2018; 7:00 p.m., BSN		at Longwood	W 75–39	14–8 (8–3)	13 – Harris	6 – Brown	6 – Currie	Willett Hall (573); Farmville, VA
February 11, 2018; 2:00 p.m., BSN		UNC Asheville	L 59–78	14–9 (8–4)	21 – Bockrath	13 – Bockrath	6 – Brown	Millis Center (542); High Point, NC
February 13, 2018; 7:00 p.m., BSN		Winthrop	W 77–40	15–9 (9–4)	23 – Bockrath	10 – Bockrath	5 – 2 tied	Millis Center (401); High Point, NC
February 17, 2018; 2:00 p.m., BSN		at Presbyterian	L 55–62	15–10 (9–5)	17 – Bockrath	13 – Edwards	3 – tied	Templeton Center (263); Clinton, SC
February 20, 2018; 7:00 p.m., BSN		Charleston Southern	W 52–49	16–10 (10–5)	15 – Edwards	13 – Currie	2 – 3 tied	Millis Center (534); High Point, NC
February 24, 2018; 2:00 p.m., ESPN3		at Gardner–Webb	L 47–54	16–11 (10–6)	10 – Morgan	9 – Bockrath	3 – Brown	Porter Arena (590); Boiling Springs, NC
February 27, 2018; 7:00 p.m., BSN		Radford	L 48–63	16–12 (10–7)	20 – Bockrath	8 – Morgan	2 – 3 tied	Millis Center (445); High Point, NC
March 3, 2018; 2:00 p.m., BSN		at Liberty	L 49–57	16–13 (10–8)	13 – Morgan	6 – Morgan	4 – Brown	Vines Center (1,260); Lynchburg, VA
Big South tournament
March 9, 2018; 2:00 p.m., ESPN3	(4)	vs. (5) Presbyterian; Quarterfinals	W 62–60	17–13	16 – Morgan	14 – Bockrath	4 – Bockrath	Vines Center (850); Lynchburg, VA
March 10, 2018; 2:00 p.m., ESPN3	(4)	at (1) Liberty; Semifinals	L 54–78	17–14	20 – Bockrath	9 – Morgan	3 – 2 tied	Vines Center; Lynchburg, VA
*Non-conference game. (#) Tournament seedings in parentheses. All times are in Eastern.

== Individual statistics ==
Player	GP	GS	MPG	FG%	3 PT%	FT%	RPG	APG	TO	STL	BLK	PPG
Emma Bockrath	31	31	33.4	.391	.318	.795	6.9	2.4	73	75	8	13.7
Kat Harris	29	1	21.2	.374	.333	.824	2.0	1.9	54	24	1	10.9
Shea Morgan	31	31	32.2	.454	.267	.791	5.6	2.0	70	32	13	9.5
Camryn Brown	31	30	32.0	.351	.337	.729	2.4	3.5	67	39	1	9.4
Lindsey Edwards	31	30	29.8	.385	.000	.833	4.0	1.3	67	49	9	7.8
Jiselle Thomas	21	0	13.3	.392	.333	.714	1.8	0.6	35	24	3	6.6
Kennedy Currie	31	28	26.6	.449	.000	.515	6.4	1.1	50	32	29	6.0
Olivia VanSlooten	31	3	11.7	.510	.000	.341	2.3	0.3	30	17	17	2.1
Hunter Fleming	16	1	8.4	.300	.111	.500	0.9	0.2	3	8	0	1.4
Taylor McGlashan	10	0	4.5	.600	.000	.000	0.7	0.2	6	2	0	0.6

=== Season highs ===
Player	Points	Rebounds	Assists
Emma Bockrath	25 @ CSU	14 vs PC	5 @ STET
Camryn Brown	28 @ UNCG	7 @ UNCG	8 vs GWU
Kennedy Currie	14 vs NCW	13 @ VT	6 @ LONG
Lindsey Edwards	20 vs BAR	13 @ PC	5 vs WIN
Hunter Fleming	7 vs NCW	5 vs NCW	1 vs WIN
Kat Harris	29 vs UAB	7 vs BAR	4 vs WIN
Taylor McGlashan	2 @ VT	4 vs NCW	1 vs PC
Shea Morgan	20 @ VT	14 @ OHIO	6 vs NCW
Jiselle Thomas	20 vs NCW	3 @ CSU	3 vs PC
Olivia VanSlooten	11 @ PC	5 @ CSU	3 @ LONG
