= 2014 Coastal Carolina Chanticleers football team =

American college football season

2014 Coastal Carolina Chanticleers football

Big South co-champion

NCAA Division I Quarterfinal, L 32–39 at North Dakota State
- Conference: Big South Conference

Ranking
- Sports Network: No. 5
- FCS Coaches: No. 5
- Record: 12–2 (4–1 Big South)
- Head coach: Joe Moglia (3rd season)
- Offensive coordinator: Dave Patenaude (3rd season)
- Offensive scheme: Pro spread
- Defensive coordinator: Clayton Carlin (3rd season)
- Base defense: 4–2–5
- Home stadium: Brooks Stadium

2014 Big South Conference football standings
	Conf.			Overall
Team	W		L	W		L
No. 5 Coastal Carolina +^	4	–	1	12	–	2
No. 17 Liberty +^	4	–	1	9	–	5
Charleston Southern	3	–	2	8	–	4
Presbyterian	3	–	2	6	–	5
Monmouth	1	–	4	6	–	5
Gardner–Webb	0	–	5	4	–	8
+ – Conference co-champions; ^ – FCS playoff participant; Rankings from The Sports Network poll

The 2014 Coastal Carolina Chanticleers football team represented Coastal Carolina University as a member of the Big South Conference during the 2014 NCAA Division I FCS football season. Led by third-year head coach Joe Moglia, the Chanticleers compiled an overall record of 12–2 with a mark of 4–1 in conference play, sharing the Big South title with Liberty. Coastal Carolina received the Big South's automatic bid into the NCAA Division I Football Championship playoffs, where, after the first-round bye, the Chanticleers defeated Richmond in the second round before losing in the quarterfinals to the eventual national champion, North Dakota State. Coastal Carolina played home games at Brooks Stadium in Conway, South Carolina.

== Schedule ==
Date	Time	Opponent	Rank	Site	TV	Result	Attendance
August 30	6:00 pm	at The Citadel*	No. 7	Johnson Hagood Stadium; Charleston, SC		W 31–16	10,828
September 6	6:00 pm	at North Carolina A&T*	No. 5	Aggie Stadium; Greensboro, NC		W 31–30	14,848
September 13	6:00 pm	South Carolina State*	No. 5	Brooks Stadium; Conway, SC	BSN	W 30–3	10,124
September 20	5:00 pm	at Florida A&M*	No. 5	Bragg Memorial Stadium; Tallahassee, FL		W 48–3	12,000
September 27	7:00 pm	Elon*	No. 3	Brooks Stadium; Conway, SC	ASN	W 31–3	9,538
October 4	7:00 pm	at Furman*	No. 3	Paladin Stadium; Greenville, SC	WMYA	W 37–31 ^{OT}	7,347
October 11	2:00 pm	at Presbyterian	No. 3	Bailey Memorial Stadium; Clinton, SC	ESPN3	W 40–28	3,073
October 25	3:30 pm	Charleston Southern^{†}	No. 4	Brooks Stadium; Conway, SC	ASN	W 43–22	10,194
November 1	3:30 pm	at Gardner–Webb	No. 3	Ernest W. Spangler Stadium; Boiling Springs, NC	ASN	W 38–14	1,748
November 8	12:00 pm	at Charlotte*	No. 3	Jerry Richardson Stadium; Charlotte, NC		W 59–34	12,052
November 15	3:00 pm	Monmouth	No. 2	Brooks Stadium; Conway, SC	ESPN3	W 52–21	8,343
November 22	1:00 pm	Liberty	No. 1	Brooks Stadium; Conway, SC (rivalry)	ESPN3	L 14–15	8,576
December 6	1:00 pm	No. 18 Richmond*	No. 6	Brooks Stadium; Conway, SC (NCAA Division I Second Round)	ESPN3	W 36–15	5,601
December 13	12:00 pm	at No. 2 North Dakota State*	No. 6	Fargodome; Fargo, ND (NCAA Division I Quarterfinal)	ESPN	L 32–39	18,049
*Non-conference game; ^{†}Homecoming; Rankings from The Sports Network Poll released prior to the game; All times are in Eastern time

== Ranking movements ==
Ranking movements Legend: ██ Increase in ranking ██ Decrease in ranking ( ) = First-place votes
	Week														
Poll	Pre	1	2	3	4	5	6	7	8	9	10	11	12	13	Final
Sports Network	7	5	5	5	3	3	3	4	4	3	3	2 (55)	1 (56)	6	5
Coaches	6	4	5	5	3	3	3	3	3	2	2	1 (20)	1 (20)	6	5
