= Hilton Head Christian Academy =

Location
- 3088 Bluffton Parkway; Bluffton, South Carolina 29910; United States; 32°15′27″N 80°53′51″W

Information
- Type: Private school
- Established: 1979 (47 years ago)
- CEEB code: 411034
- Head of school: Doug Langhals
- Grades: K–12
- Colors: Blue and Gold
- Mascot: Eagles
- Website: www.hhca.org

Hilton Head Christian Academy (HHCA) is a private, college preparatory Christian school for kindergarten through 12th grade, located in Bluffton, South Carolina, United States.

== History ==
HHCA was founded in 1979 and sits on a 27.7-acre campus in the town of Bluffton. It was originally located on nearby Hilton Head Island but relocated to Bluffton in January 2021. It is the only school in Beaufort County accredited by both the Association of Christian Schools International (ACSI) and the Southern Association of Colleges and Schools (SACS).
