= 2000–01 Clemson Tigers women's basketball team =

Women's college basketball season

2000–01 Clemson Tigers women's basketball

NCAA Tournament, Second Round
- Conference: Atlantic Coast Conference
- Record: 21–10 (10–6 ACC)
- Head coach: Jim Davis (14th season)
- Home arena: Littlejohn Coliseum

The 2000–01 Clemson Tigers women's basketball team represented Clemson University during the 2000–01 NCAA Division I women's basketball season. The Tigers were led by fourteenth year head coach Jim Davis. The Tigers, members of the Atlantic Coast Conference, played their home games at Littlejohn Coliseum.

== Schedule ==
Date time, TV	Rank^{#}	Opponent^{#}	Result	Record	Site city, state
November 18, 2000*		at No. 25 Illinois	L 62–80	0–1	Assembly Hall; Champaign, Illinois
November 20, 2000*		East Carolina	W 92–58	1–1	Littlejohn Coliseum; Clemson, South Carolina
November 24, 2000*		vs. No. 2 Tennessee; Women's Maui	L 58–86	1–2	Lahaina Civic Center; Lahaina, Hawaii
November 25, 2000*		vs. Alcorn State; Women's Maui	W 66–58	2–2	Lahaina Civic Center; Lahaina, Hawaii
November 29, 2000*		at South Carolina rivalry	W 56–43	3–2	Carolina Coliseum; Columbia, South Carolina
December 6, 2000*		Furman	W 80–59	4–2	Littlejohn Coliseum; Clemson, South Carolina
December 9, 2000		No. 3 Duke	W 93–75	5–2 (1–0)	Littlejohn Coliseum; Clemson, South Carolina
December 16, 2000*		UNC–Greensboro	W 89–65	6–2 (1–0)	Littlejohn Coliseum; Clemson, South Carolina
December 18, 2000*		Virginia Tech	W 80–59	7–2 (1–0)	Littlejohn Coliseum; Clemson, South Carolina
December 21, 2000*		vs. No. 9 Auburn	W 72–61	8–2 (1–0)	Myrtle Beach Convention Center; Myrtle Beach, South Carolina
December 28, 2000*	No. 20	Wofford	W 73–63	9–2 (1–0)	Littlejohn Coliseum; Clemson, South Carolina
December 30, 2000*	No. 20	at Winthrop	W 79–46	10–2 (1–0)	Winthrop Coliseum; Rock Hill, South Carolina
January 2, 2001	No. 18	at Maryland	L 73–85 ^{OT}	10–3 (1–1)	Cole Field House; College Park, Maryland
January 5, 2001	No. 18	at No. 16 NC State	W 67–52	11–3 (2–1)	Reynolds Coliseum; Raleigh, North Carolina
January 8, 2001	No. 16	North Carolina	L 70–71	11–4 (2–2)	Littlejohn Coliseum; Clemson, South Carolina
January 11, 2001	No. 16	Wake Forest	W 67–45	12–4 (3–2)	Littlejohn Coliseum; Clemson, South Carolina
January 15, 2001	No. 20	at No. 25 Virginia	W 87–71	13–4 (4–2)	University Hall; Charlottesville, Virginia
January 18, 2001	No. 20	at Georgia Tech	W 72–64	14–4 (5–2)	Alexander Memorial Coliseum; Atlanta, Georgia
January 21, 2001	No. 20	Florida State	W 79–66	15–4 (6–2)	Littlejohn Coliseum; Clemson, South Carolina
January 28, 2001	No. 15	at No. 4 Duke	L 42–92	15–5 (6–3)	Cameron Indoor Stadium; Durham, North Carolina
February 1, 2001	No. 17	Maryland	L 62–68	15–6 (6–4)	Littlejohn Coliseum; Clemson, South Carolina
February 4, 2001	No. 17	NC State	L 50–56	15–7 (6–5)	Littlejohn Coliseum; Clemson, South Carolina
February 8, 2001	No. 25	at North Carolina	L 99–100 ^{2OT}	15–8 (6–6)	Carmichael Arena; Chapel Hill, North Carolina
February 11, 2001	No. 25	at Wake Forest	W 72–55	16–8 (7–6)	LJVM Coliseum; Winston-Salem, North Carolina
February 15, 2001		Virginia	W 78–71	17–8 (8–6)	Littlejohn Coliseum; Clemson, South Carolina
February 19, 2001		Georgia Tech	W 68–49	18–8 (9–6)	Littlejohn Coliseum; Clemson, South Carolina
February 22, 2001		at Florida State	W 63–49	19–8 (10–6)	Tallahassee–Leon County Civic Center; Tallahassee, Florida
ACC Tournament
March 3, 2001*	No. 25	vs. North Carolina; ACC Tournament quarterfinal	W 75–57	20–8 (10–6)	Greensboro Coliseum; Greensboro, North Carolina
March 4, 2001*	No. 25	vs. No. 21 NC State; ACC Tournament semifinal	L 52–65	20–9 (10–6)	Greensboro Coliseum; Greensboro, North Carolina
NCAA Tournament
March 16, 2001*	No. 22	vs. Chattanooga; NCAA Tournament first round	W 51–49	21–9 (10–6)	Cintas Center; Cincinnati, Ohio
March 18, 2001*	No. 22	at No. 12 Xavier; NCAA Tournament second round	L 62–77	21–10 (10–6)	Cintas Center; Cincinnati, Ohio
*Non-conference game. ^{#}Rankings from AP Poll. (#) Tournament seedings in parentheses.
