= Liberty Flames Sports Network =

Collegiate sports radio network

- City: Lynchburg, Virginia
- Channels: Digital: Various Television stations/networks
- Branding: LFSN

Ownership
- Owner: Liberty University; Liberty Flames
- Sister stations: WZBJ-CD

Links
- Website: LFSN Website

Victory Radio Network
- Type: Radio network
- Country: United States
- Availability: Various AM and FM radio stations
- Headquarters: Lynchburg, Virginia
- Broadcast area: Statewide Virginia; Washington, D.C. Northeastern and Central North Carolina
- Owner: Liberty University; Liberty Flames
- Official website: LFSN Website

The Liberty Flames Sports Network (also known as LFSN) is an American syndicated regional radio and television network with occasional broadcasts. The network broadcasts Liberty University Flames football, volleyball, softball and baseball as well as men's and women's basketball games over the air on television and radio.

== Radio broadcasts ==
The Victory Radio Network provides Flames football and basketball games to 25 radio stations in Virginia (mainly from Marion eastward and 7 stations in northeastern North Carolina in areas east of Raleigh. The network also has limited coverage in north-central North Carolina, eastern and southern West Virginia, southern Maryland and the Washington, D.C. area. Flagship stations include WLNI and WFIR for men's basketball.

== Television programming ==
The LFSN broadcasts Liberty Flames men's and women's basketball, volleyball, softball and baseball games to select television stations in Virginia. Liberty Flames football, on the other hand, can be seen in up to 90 million households throughout the contiguous 48 states and the Anchorage, Alaska area.

The LFSN's nationwide availability of Flames football on television is due in part of religious television networks and stations having syndication rights to carry them well beyond the Lynchburg/Roanoke media market, especially when not featured on major commercial television networks. The networks include JUCE TV (a unit of the Trinity Broadcasting Network, available on the third digital subchannel of all TBN owned-and-operated stations), The Walk TV, and the Tri-State Christian Television network. All three of those networks are available over-the-air, cable, satellite, as well as on the Roku digital media receiver. In addition, all three channels are also available through the use of free-to-air satellite television equipment. Cable-exclusive children's religious network Kids & Teens TV (Dish Network channel 264) also airs Liberty Flames football.

Game On is a LFSN-produced sports show that features sport stories throughout the world of sports. It, too, is also available through the networks that run LFSN-produced football games.

The two over-the-air television flagship stations are formerly-Liberty University-owned independent station WZBJ-CD in Lynchburg, and ABC affiliate WSET-TV in Roanoke.
