= Carey Green =

American basketball coach

Biographical details
- Born: March 31, 1956 (age 70); Louisville, Tennessee
- Education: Coastal Carolina ('79)

Coaching career (HC unless noted)
- 1979–1981: Roane State CC (asst.)
- 1981–1982: Coalfield HS (boys)
- 1982–1984: Rockwood HS
- 1984–1987: Jackson St. CC (men's/women's)
- 1987–1999: Clemson (assistant)
- 1999–2025: Liberty

Head coaching record
- Overall: 591–240 (.711)
- Tournaments: 2–14 (NCAA); 1–3 (WNIT)

Accomplishments and honors

Championships
- 14× Big South regular season (2000–2006, 2008, 2009, 2011–2013, 2018); 13× Big South Tournament (2000–2006, 2008–2010, 2012, 2013, 2015)

Awards
- TJCAA Coach of Year (1986); 5× Big South Coach of Year (2000, 2003, 2006, 2008, 2009); 5× VaSID Coach of Year (2003, 2005, 2006, 2008, 2009)

Carey Jay Green (born March 31, 1956) is the former head coach of the Liberty University women's basketball team. He has one of the highest winning percentages of NCAA active women's coaches at 74%.

== Head coaching record ==
- Liberty
- ASUN

Record table
| Season | Team | Overall | Conference | Standing | Postseason |
|---|---|---|---|---|---|
Liberty Lady Flames (Big South Conference) (1999–2018)
| 1999–00 | Liberty | 23–8 | 12–2 | 1st | NCAA First Round |
| 2000–01 | Liberty | 18–12 | 12–2 | 1st | NCAA First Round |
| 2001–02 | Liberty | 23–8 | 13–1 | 1st | NCAA First Round |
| 2002–03 | Liberty | 26–4 | 14–0 | 1st | NCAA First Round |
| 2003–04 | Liberty | 25–7 | 14–0 | 1st | NCAA First Round |
| 2004–05 | Liberty | 26–7 | 13–1 | 1st | NCAA Sweet 16 |
| 2005–06 | Liberty | 25–6 | 13–1 | 1st | NCAA First Round |
| 2006–07 | Liberty | 19–12 | 10–4 | T–2nd | |
| 2007–08 | Liberty | 28–4 | 11–1 | 1st | NCAA First Round |
| 2008–09 | Liberty | 24–9 | 15–1 | 1st | NCAA First Round |
| 2009–10 | Liberty | 27–6 | 14–2 | 2nd | NCAA First Round |
| 2010–11 | Liberty | 22–11 | 14–2 | 1st | WNIT First Round |
| 2011–12 | Liberty | 24–9 | 16–2 | 1st | NCAA First Round |
| 2012–13 | Liberty | 27–7 | 16–2 | 1st | NCAA First Round |
| 2013–14 | Liberty | 20–11 | 15–5 | T–2nd | |
| 2014–15 | Liberty | 26–7 | 19–1 | 1st | NCAA First Round |
| 2015–16 | Liberty | 20–13 | 15–5 | 2nd | WNIT First Round |
| 2016–17 | Liberty | 13–17 | 12–6 | 4th | |
| 2017–18 | Liberty | 24–10 | 16–2 | 1st | NCAA First Round |
| Liberty (Big South): | | 440–167 (.725) | 264–40 (.868) | | |
Liberty Lady Flames (ASUN Conference) (2018–2023)
| 2018–19 | Liberty | 16–16 | 10–6 | T–3rd | |
| 2019–20 | Liberty | 20–11 | 11–5 | T–2nd | |
| 2020–21 | Liberty | 19–8 | 12–4 | 2nd | |
| 2021–22 | Liberty | 28–5 | 14–2 | 2nd (East) | WNIT Second round |
| 2022–23 | Liberty | 24–9 | 16–2 | 2nd | WNIT First round |
| Liberty (ASUN): | | 107–49 (.686) | 63–19 (.768) | | |
Liberty Lady Flames (Conference USA) (2023–2025)
| 2023–24 | Liberty | 18–16 | 11–5 | T–2nd | |
| 2024–25 | Liberty | 26–7 | 16–2 | T–1st | NCAA First Round |
| Liberty (C–USA): | | 44–23 (.657) | 27–7 (.794) | | |
| Total: | | 591–240 (.711) | | | |
National champion Postseason invitational champion Conference regular season champion Conference regular season and conference tournament champion Division regular season champion Division regular season and conference tournament champion Conference tournament champion
