= 2014 Delaware Fightin' Blue Hens football team =

American college football season

2014 Delaware Fightin' Blue Hens football
- Conference: Colonial Athletic Association
- Record: 6–6 (4–4 CAA)
- Head coach: Dave Brock (2nd season)
- Offensive coordinator: Sean Devine (2nd season)
- Offensive scheme: Multiple
- Co-defensive coordinators: Dennis Dottin-Carter (1st season); Tim Weaver (2nd season)
- Base defense: 4–3
- Home stadium: Delaware Stadium

2014 Colonial Athletic Association football standings
	Conf.			Overall
Team	W		L	W		L
No. 3 New Hampshire $^	8	–	0	12	–	2
No. 7 Villanova ^	7	–	1	11	–	3
No. 18 James Madison ^	6	–	2	9	–	4
No. 16 Richmond ^	5	–	3	9	–	5
William & Mary	4	–	4	7	–	5
Delaware	4	–	4	6	–	6
Maine	4	–	4	5	–	6
Stony Brook	4	–	4	5	–	7
Albany	3	–	5	7	–	5
Towson	2	–	6	4	–	8
Rhode Island	1	–	7	1	–	11
Elon	0	–	8	1	–	11
$ – Conference champion; ^ – FCS playoff participant; Rankings from The Sports Network poll

The 2014 Delaware Fightin' Blue Hens football team represented the University of Delaware as a member of the Colonial Athletic Association (CAA) during the 2014 NCAA Division I FCS football season. Led by second-year head coach Dave Brock, the Fightin' Blue Hens compiled an overall record of 6–6 with a mark of 4–4 in conference play, placing in a four-way tie for fifth in the CAA. The team played home games at Delaware Stadium in Newark, Delaware.

== Preseason ==
=== Recruiting class ===
Delaware announced the signing of 22 players on February 5, 2014.

College recruiting information
Name	Hometown	School	Height	Weight	40^{‡}	Commit date
Ryley Angeline; ATH	Chester Springs, PA	Downingtown East HS	6 ft 3 in (1.91 m)	218 lb (99 kg)	–	Aug 5, 2013
Ryley Angeline; ATH	Recruit ratings: Rivals:					
Charles Bell; LB	Conestoga, PA	Penn Manor HS	6 ft 1 in (1.85 m)	225 lb (102 kg)	–	Dec 8, 2013
Charles Bell; LB	Recruit ratings: No ratings found					
Malcolm Brown; DB	Gaithersburg, MD	Quince Orchard HS	6 ft 1 in (1.85 m)	190 lb (86 kg)	–	Dec 11, 2013
Malcolm Brown; DB	Recruit ratings: No ratings found					
Tre Brown; WR	Harrisburg, PA	Milton Hershey HS	6 ft 2 in (1.88 m)	195 lb (88 kg)	4.42	Aug 16, 2013
Tre Brown; WR	Recruit ratings: Rivals:					
Mario Farinella; OL	Bloomfield, NJ	Bergen Catholic HS	6 ft 2 in (1.88 m)	295 lb (134 kg)	5.0	Aug 24, 2013
Mario Farinella; OL	Recruit ratings: No ratings found					
Troy Gallen; WR	Glen Mills, PA	Malvern Prep	6 ft 0 in (1.83 m)	175 lb (79 kg)	4.36	Aug 13, 2013
Troy Gallen; WR	Recruit ratings: No ratings found					
Andrew Grau; TE	Rehoboth Beach, DE	Cape Henlopen HS	6 ft 5 in (1.96 m)	225 lb (102 kg)	–	Feb 5, 2014
Andrew Grau; TE	Recruit ratings: No ratings found					
Maurice Harley; DB	Upper Marlboro, MD	St. John's College HS	6 ft 0 in (1.83 m)	201 lb (91 kg)	–	Feb 5, 2014
Maurice Harley; DB	Recruit ratings: No ratings found					
Anthony Jackson; LB	Riverdale, MD	Suitland HS	6 ft 0 in (1.83 m)	210 lb (95 kg)	4.7	Sep 16, 2013
Anthony Jackson; LB	Recruit ratings: Rivals:					
Quai Jefferson; WR	Woodland Park, NJ	St Joseph Regional HS	6 ft 0 in (1.83 m)	188 lb (85 kg)	–	Nov 5, 2013
Quai Jefferson; WR	Recruit ratings: Rivals:					
Thomas Jefferson; RB	Prospect Park, NJ	Passaic Tech	6 ft 1 in (1.85 m)	205 lb (93 kg)	–	Jan 26, 2014
Thomas Jefferson; RB	Recruit ratings: No ratings found					
James Kretkowski; OL	Mineola, NY	Oceanside HS	6 ft 6 in (1.98 m)	285 lb (129 kg)	–	Dec 8, 2013
James Kretkowski; OL	Recruit ratings: No ratings found					
John Nassib; DE	West Chester, PA	Malvern Prep	6 ft 6 in (1.98 m)	260 lb (120 kg)	–	Nov 20, 2013
John Nassib; DE	Recruit ratings: No ratings found					
Bilal Nichols; DL	Newark, DE	Hodgson Vo-Tech	6 ft 4 in (1.93 m)	250 lb (110 kg)	–	Nov 18, 2013
Bilal Nichols; DL	Recruit ratings: No ratings found					
Jethro Pepe; OL	Colonia, NJ	St. Joseph's HS	6 ft 6 in (1.98 m)	245 lb (111 kg)	–	Aug 16, 2013
Jethro Pepe; OL	Recruit ratings: No ratings found					
Jake Powell; TE	Marlton, NJ	Cherokee HS	6 ft 5 in (1.96 m)	220 lb (100 kg)	–	Aug 12, 2013
Jake Powell; TE	Recruit ratings: No ratings found					
Frank Raggo; K	Randolph, NJ	Randolph HS	5 ft 9 in (1.75 m)	163 lb (74 kg)	–	Feb 5, 2014
Frank Raggo; K	Recruit ratings: No ratings found					
Donte Raymond; LB	Rahway, NJ	Rahway HS	6 ft 0 in (1.83 m)	203 lb (92 kg)	–	Jan 20, 2014
Donte Raymond; LB	Recruit ratings: Rivals:					
Bryan Reed; OL	Mount Sinai, NY	Mount Sinai HS	6 ft 2 in (1.88 m)	291 lb (132 kg)	–	Jul 31, 2013
Bryan Reed; OL	Recruit ratings: Rivals:					
Joseph Walker; QB	Philadelphia, PA	Martin Luther King HS	6 ft 3 in (1.91 m)	207 lb (94 kg)	4.57	Dec 29, 2013
Joseph Walker; QB	Recruit ratings: Rivals:					
Brandon Whaley; TE	Haymarket, VA	Battlefield HS	6 ft 4 in (1.93 m)	230 lb (100 kg)	4.8	Oct 2, 2013
Brandon Whaley; TE	Recruit ratings: No ratings found					
Kareem Williams; RB	Schnecksville, PA	Parkland HS	5 ft 10 in (1.78 m)	185 lb (84 kg)	4.49	Jan 24, 2014
Kareem Williams; RB	Recruit ratings: No ratings found					
Overall recruit ranking:
‡ Refers to 40-yard dash; Note: In many cases, Scout, Rivals, 247Sports, On3, and ESPN may conflict in their listings of height, weight and 40 time.; In these cases, the average was taken. ESPN grades are on a 100-point scale.; Sources: "Delaware Commit List for 2014". Rivals.; "RecruitTracker 2014: Delaware". ESPN.; "2014 Team Ranking". Rivals.com.

=== Transfers ===
Three players transferred into Delaware for the 2014 Season:

Player	Position	Previous School	Hometown
C.J. Jones	DB	Boston College	Wilmington, DE
Blake Rankin	QB	Rutgers	Bloomsburg, PA
Anthony Speziale	OL	Wagner	Manahawkin, NJ

=== Preseason awards ===
- Nick Boyle – CAA Football Preseason All-Conference Team (Tight End)
- Eric Enderson – CAA Football Preseason All-Conference Team (Punter), The Sports Network FCS Preseason All-American Second Team (Punter)
- Michael Johnson – The Sports Network FCS Preseason All-American Third Team (All Purpose).
- Jalen Randolph – CoSIDA/ESPN The Magazine Academic All-American Candidate
- Ryan Torza – CoSIDA/ESPN The Magazine Academic All-American Candidate
- Laith Wallschleger – CoSIDA/ESPN The Magazine Academic All-American Candidate

=== Conference predictions ===
Delaware was picked to finish sixth in the CAA Preseason Poll.

CAA Preseason Poll (first place votes)
1. New Hampshire (15)
2. Villanova (2)
3. Richmond (3)
4. William & Mary (3)
5. Towson
6. Delaware
7. Maine
8. James Madison (1)
9. Stony Brook
10. UAlbany
11. Rhode Island
12. Elon

=== Preseason rankings ===
==== FCS Coaches Poll ====
Delaware received 15 votes in the Preseason Coaches Poll, resulting in a tie for 35th. The Blue Hens face four teams ranked in the preseason poll (#4 New Hampshire, #7 Towson, #13 Villanova, and #22 William & Mary). In addition, they meet up with two teams to receive votes but not be ranked (James Madison and Sacred Heart).

==== The Sports Network FCS Poll ====
Delaware received 213 votes in the Preseason TSN poll, good for 29th overall. The Blue Hens are scheduled to face four teams that were ranked in the poll in 2014 (#4 New Hampshire, #12 Villanova, #13 Towson, and #19 William & Mary). In addition, they will face two teams that received votes but were not in the top 25 (James Madison – 180 votes and Sacred Heart – 14 votes).

== Schedule ==
Date	Time	Opponent	Rank	Site	TV	Result	Attendance
August 30	12:00 pm	at Pittsburgh*		Heinz Field; Pittsburgh, PA	ESPN3	L 0–62	40,549
September 7	12:00 pm	Delaware State*		Delaware Stadium; Newark, DE (Route 1 Rivalry)	HAA	W 27–9	12,511
September 13	6:00 pm	Colgate*		Delaware Stadium; Newark, DE	HAA	W 28–25	15,319
September 27	4:00 pm	at James Madison	No. 25	Bridgeforth Stadium; Harrisonburg, VA (rivalry)	CSN	W 30–23 ^{OT}	20,592
October 4	3:30 pm	Sacred Heart*	No. 24	Delaware Stadium; Newark, DE	HAA	L 7–10	14,894
October 11	3:30 pm	Elon		Delaware Stadium; Newark, DE	HAA	W 34–24	19,476
October 18	12:30 pm	Towson^{†}		Delaware Stadium; Newark, DE	CSN	L 17–24	17,718
October 25	12:30 pm	at No. 18 William & Mary		Zable Stadium; Williamsburg, VA (rivalry)	CSN	L 17–31	7,614
November 1	12:00 pm	Rhode Island		Delaware Stadium; Newark, DE	HAA	W 28–13	12,798
November 8	3:30 pm	at Albany		Bob Ford Field; Albany, NY		W 31–28	4,674
November 15	1:00 pm	at No. 1 New Hampshire		Cowell Stadium; Durham, NH		L 14–43	8,199
November 22	12:00 pm	No. 6 Villanova		Delaware Stadium; Newark, DE (Battle of the Blue)	HAA	L 28–35	17,056
*Non-conference game; ^{†}Homecoming; Rankings from The Sports Network Poll released prior to the game; All times are in Eastern time

== Opening depth chart ==
Defense

FS
Jake Giusti
Craig Brodsky
Kivar Thurman

WLB	MLB	SLB
⋅	David Mackall	⋅
Jalen Kindle	Larry Spears	⋅
Brandon Snyder	Eric Patton	⋅

SS
Ryan Torzsa
Simba Gwashavanhu
Kaliq Gatson

CB
Mario Rowson
Mark Doe
Malcolm Brown

DE	DT	DT	DE
Laith Wallschleger	Josh Plummer	David Tinsley	Derrick Saulsberry
Chris Corvino	Blaine Woodson	Grant Roberts	Vince Hollerman
Jordan Andrews	Cedric Udegbe	⋅	Brandon Henderson

CB
Roman Tatum
Justin Watson
⋅

Offense

WR
Jerel Harrison
Ricky Bell
Diante Cherry

WR
Stephen Clark
Andrew Opoku
DeAndre Davis

LT	LG	C	RG	RT
Ben Curtis	Will Lewis	Brody Kern	JD Dzurko	Connor Bozick
Jacob Trump	Andrew Consevage	Peter Thistle	Christian Marchena	Justin Glenn
Shawn Davis	Michael Radespiel	Mario Farinella	Sam Collura	James Kretkowski

TE
Nick Boyle
Matt Rodriguez
Anthony Speziale

WR
Michael Johnson
Andrew Peterson
Ricky Emerson

QB
Trent Hurley
Justin Burns
Richard Czeczotka

RB
Jalen Randolph
Wes Hills
Trejon Dinkins

Special teams
PK Garrett Greenway
PK Brandon Tuozzolo
P Eric Enderson
P Kevin McLaughlin
KR Michael Johnson
PR Stephen Clark
LS Joe Fortunato
H Eric Enderson

== Coaching staff ==
Name	Position	Year	Alma mater
Dave Brock	Head coach	2013	Salisbury (1994)
Sean Devine	Offensive coordinator/offensive line	2013	Colby (1994)
Tim Weaver	Co-defensive coordinator/linebackers	2013	Davidson (1990)
Dennis Dottin-Carter	Co-defensive coordinator/defensive line	2013	Maine (2002)
Brian Ginn	Quarterbacks	2000	Delaware (2000)
Bryan Bossard	Wide receivers	2014	Delaware (1988)
Tony Lucas	Running backs	2013	Columbia (2003)
Eddie Allen	Special teams coordinator/tight ends	2014	New Haven (2003)
Henry Baker	Cornerbacks	2011	Maryland (2003)
Tom McEntire	Safeties	2013	Thiel (2006)
Jerry Oravitz	Associate Director of Athletics for Football Administration	1997	Salisbury (1984)
David Baylor	Player Development	2006	Bentley (1997)
Jude Moser	Administrative Assistant		

== Roster ==
(as of July 29, 2014)
Quarterbacks: 2 Trent Hurley – Senior; 7 Blake Rankin – Sophomore; 8 Justin Burns – Senior; 15 Joseph Walker – Freshman; 16 Richard Czeczotka – Sophomore; Wide receivers: 4 Jerel Harrison – Junior; 6 Andrew Opoku – Senior; 17 Michael Johnson – Senior; 18 Quai Jefferson – Freshman; 21 Stephen Clark – Senior; 27 Troy Gallen – Freshman; 37 Ricky Emerson – (redshirt) Freshman; 80 Diante Cherry – (redshirt) Freshman; 81 Andrew Peterson – Sophomore; 83 Kevin Macari – Junior; 84 DeAndre Davis – (redshirt) Freshman; 85 Rick Bell – Junior; 88 Tre Brown – Freshman; Tight ends: 10 Kyle Yocum – (redshirt) Freshman; 26 Ryan Cobb – Senior; 30 Ryley Angeline – Freshman; 82 Matt Rodriguez – Junior; 86 Nick Boyle – Senior; 87 Jake Powell – Freshman; 97 Andrew Grau – Freshman; 99 Brandon Whaley – Freshman	Running backs: 28 Thomas Jefferson – Freshman; 31 Wes Hills – Sophomore; 32 Kareem Williams – Freshman; 33 Jalen Randolph – Sophomore; 47 Trejon Dinkins – (redshirt) Freshman; Offensive line: 53 Andrew Consevage – Junior; 54 Brody Kern – (redshirt) Freshman; 60 Peter Thistle – Sophomore; 61 Justin Glenn – Junior; 63 Shawn Davis – Sophomore; 64 Bryan Reed – Freshman; 67 JD Dzurko – Senior; 68 Will Lewis – Sophomore; 69 Ben Curtis – Junior; 70 Jake Trump – (redshirt) Freshman; 71 Sam Collura – Junior; 74 Michael Radespiel – Sophomore; 75 Connor Bozick – Sophomore; 76 Christian Marchena – Junior; 77 Mario Farinella – Freshman; 78 Jethro Pepe – Freshman; 79 James Kretkowski – Freshman; 92 Anthony Speziale – (redshirt) Freshman	Defensive line: 45 Chris Corvino – Senior; 46 Laith Wallschleger – Senior; 55 Brandon Henderson – Sophomore; 57 Grant Roberts – (redshirt) Freshman; 58 Josh Plummer – Junior; 59 Vince Hollerman – Junior; 72 David Tinsley – Junior; 73 Blaine Woodson – (redshirt) Freshman; 90 Derrick Saulsberry – Senior; 92 Bilal Nichols – Freshman; 95 John Nassib – Freshman; 96 Cedric Udegbe – (redshirt) Freshman; Linebackers: 5 Charles Bell – Freshman; 20 Donte Raymond – Freshman; 25 David Mackall – Senior; 29 Anthony Jackson – Freshman; 34 Jalen Kindle – (redshirt) Freshman; 34 Justice Smith – (redshirt) Freshman; 40 Derek Battle – Junior; 41 Kennedy Ogbonna – Senior; 42 Eric Patton – Sophomore; 43 Larry Spears – (redshirt) Freshman; 44 Pat Callaway – Senior; 50 Brandon Snyder – Sophomore; 51 Christopher Lail – Sophomore; 52 Nate Haase – (redshirt) Freshman; 53 Tommy Wilmoth – (redshirt) Freshman; 54 Jordan Andrews – (redshirt) Freshman; 91 Randall Schiccatano – (redshirt) Freshman	Defensive backs: 1 Malcolm Brown – Freshman; 3 Craig Brodsky – Junior; 9 Roman Tatum – Sophomore; 11 Jake Giusti – Senior; 12 Mark Doe – Sophomore; 13 Maurice Harley – Freshman; 14 Simba Gwashavanhu – Sophomore; 22 Justin Watson – (redshirt) Freshman; 23 Mario Rowson – Senior; 24 Ryan Torzsa – Sophomore; 31 Chris Buckley – (redshirt) Freshman; 35 Khalig Gatson – Sophomore; 37 Kivar Thurman – Senior; Punters: 49 Eric Enderson – Sophomore; Place Kickers: 19 Garrett Greenway – Junior; 36 Brandon Tuozzolo – Sophomore; 39 Kevin McLaughlin – Sophomore; 98 Frank Raggo – Freshman; Long Snappers: 66 Tim Sheridan – (redshirt) Freshman; 89 Joe Fortunato – Junior

== Game summaries ==
=== Pittsburgh ===
Team	1	2	3	4	Total
Blue Hens	0	0	0	0	0
• Panthers	21	21	13	7	62

- Location: Heinz Field
  Pittsburgh, Pennsylvania
- Game start: 12:04 PM
- Elapsed time: 2:53
- Game attendance: 40,549
- Game weather: Temp: 77 • Wind: 5 SE • Weather: Sunny
- Referee: Duane Heydt
- Television network: ESPN3

Scoring summary
1	11:01	Pittsburgh	James Conner 7 yard run (Chris Blewitt kick)	Pittsburgh 7–0
1	2:25	Pittsburgh	Tyler Boyd 14 yard pass from Chad Voytik (Chris Blewitt kick)	Pittsburgh 14–0
1	0:07	Pittsburgh	James Conner 8 yard run (Chris Blewitt kick)	Pittsburgh 21–0
2	9:42	Pittsburgh	James Conner 1 yard run (Chris Blewitt kick)	Pittsburgh 28–0
2	6:16	Pittsburgh	James Conner 19 yard run (Chris Blewitt kick)	Pittsburgh 35–0
2	2:25	Pittsburgh	Chris James 1 yard run (Chris Blewitt kick)	Pittsburgh 42–0
3	11:28	Pittsburgh	Isaac Bennett 5 yard run (kick failed)	Pittsburgh 48–0
3	0:14	Pittsburgh	Scott Orndoff 2 yard pass from Chad Voytik (Chris Blewitt kick)	Pittsburgh 55–0
4	4:11	Pittsburgh	Chris James 18 yard run (Chris Blewitt kick)	Pittsburgh 62–0

- Pittsburgh was coming off a win over Bowling Green in the Little Caesars Pizza Bowl in 2013.
- First time Delaware was shut out since September 14, 1996 (a 27–0 loss at Villanova), snapping a streak of 220 games.
- Largest margin of defeat for Delaware since September 24, 1921 (an 89–0 loss at Pennsylvania).
- Offensive MVP: Nick Boyle – TE
- Defensive MVP: Simba Gwashavanhu – SS
- Special Teams MVP: Andrew Opoku – WR
- Pittsburgh went on to fall to Houston in the Armed Forces Bowl.

=== Delaware State ===
Route 1 Rivalry

Team	1	2	3	4	Total
Hornets	0	3	0	6	9
• Blue Hens	7	13	7	0	27

- Location: Delaware Stadium
  Newark, Delaware
- Game start: 12:06 PM
- Elapsed time: 2:33
- Game attendance: 12,511
- Game weather: Temp: 73 • Wind: 11 N • Weather: Sunny
- Referee: Char. Lamertina

Scoring summary
1	11:07	Delaware	Wes Hills 1 yard run (Garrett Greenway kick)	Delaware 7–0
2	11:29	Delaware State	Mitchell Ward 26 yard field goal	Delaware 7–3
2	10:53	Delaware	Jalen Randolph 20 yard run (Garrett Greenway kick)	Delaware 14–3
2	3:52	Delaware	Garrett Greenway 34 yard field goal	Delaware 17–3
2	0:01	Delaware	Garrett Greenway 27 yard field goal	Delaware 20–3
3	12:06	Delaware	Jalen Randolph 46 yard run (Garrett Greenway kick)	Delaware 27–3
4	5:16	Delaware State	Malcolm Williams 14 yard run (kick failed)	Delaware 27–9

- Postponed from September 6 at 6 PM to September 7 at 12 PM due to lightning in the area.
- Jalen Randolph named Nate Beasley MVP.
- Offensive MVP: Jalen Randolph – RB
- Defensive MVP: Vince Hollerman – DE
- Special Teams MVP: Michael Johnson – WR

=== Colgate ===
Team	1	2	3	4	Total
Raiders	9	6	10	0	25
• Blue Hens	14	0	0	14	28

- Location: Delaware Stadium
  Newark, Delaware
- Game start: 6:06 PM
- Elapsed time: 2:51
- Game attendance: 15,319
- Game weather: Temp: 66 • Wind: 7 NNW • Weather: Overcast, cool
- Referee: Henry Wimberg

Scoring summary
1	11:40	Delaware	Nick Boyle 8 yard pass from Trent Hurley (Garrett Greenway kick)	Delaware 7–0
1	8:54	Colgate	Jonah Bowman 43 yard field goal	Delaware 7–3
1	5:03	Colgate	James Travelin 2 yard run (Ty Edmond run failed)	Colgate 9–7
1	0:42	Delaware	Nick Boyle 1 yard pass from Trent Hurley (Garrett Greenway kick)	Delaware 14–9
2	10:18	Colgate	Jonah Bowman 40 yard field goal	Delaware 14–12
2	1:21	Colgate	Jonah Bowman 32 yard field goal	Colgate 15–14
3	8:20	Colgate	Jonah Bowman 32 yard field goal	Colgate 18–14
3	2:03	Colgate	Jake Melville 25 yard run (Jonah Bowman kick)	Colgate 25–14
4	7:03	Delaware	Wes Hills 1 yard run (Trent Hurley pass failed)	Colgate 25–20
4	0:41	Delaware	Trent Hurley 5 yard run (Michael Johnson run)	Delaware 28–25

=== James Madison ===
Team	1	2	3	4	OT	Total
• #25 Blue Hens	6	7	0	10	7	30
Dukes	6	0	0	17	0	23

- Location: Bridgeforth Stadium
  Harrisonburg, Virginia
- Game start: 4:00 PM
- Elapsed time: 3:29
- Game attendance: 20,592
- Game weather: Temp: 77 • Wind: NE 2 mph • Weather: Sunny/clear
- Referee: Tony Marcella
- Television network: Comcast SportsNet

Scoring summary
1	14:45	Delaware	Jalen Randolph 75 yard pass from Trent Hurley (kick failed)	Delaware 6–0
1	0:25	James Madison	Daniel Brown 5 yard pass from Vad Lee (kick failed)	Tied 6–6
2	2:27	Delaware	Michael Johnson 1 yard run (Garrett Greenway kick)	Delaware 13–6
4	8:09	Delaware	Garrett Greenway 28 yard field goal	Delaware 16–6
4	5:15	James Madison	DeAndre' Smith 3 yard pass from Vad Lee (Connor Arnone kick)	Delaware 16–13
4	2:55	James Madison	Connor Arnone 43 yard field goal	Tied 16–16
4	1:37	Delaware	Jerel Harrison 86 yard pass from Trent Hurley (Garrett Greenway kick)	Delaware 23–16
4	0:20	James Madison	Vad Lee 2 yard run (Connor Arnone kick)	Tied 23–23
OT	–	Delaware	Jerel Harrison 4 yard pass from Trent Hurley (Garrett Greenway kick)	Delaware 30–23

- Delaware's first OT win since September 10, 2005, against Lehigh (34–33). Hens had lost three consecutive OT games since (2007 v. Richmond (5OT), 2010 v. Villanova, and 2012 v. Towson).
- James Madison went on to fall in the first round of the NCAA First Round to Liberty.

=== Sacred Heart ===
Team	1	2	3	4	Total
• Pioneers	0	7	0	3	10
#24 Blue Hens	7	0	0	0	7

- Location: Delaware Stadium
  Newark, Delaware
- Game start: 3:36 PM
- Elapsed time: 2:57
- Game attendance: 14,894
- Game weather: Temp: 64 • Wind: 15 WNW • Weather: Cloudy
- Referee: Hank Johns

Scoring summary
1	14:46	Delaware	Jalen Randolph 79 yard run (Garrett Greenway kick)	Delaware 7–0
2	14:46	Sacred Heart	Tyler Dube 8 yard pass from RJ Noel (Chris Rogers kick)	Tied 7–7
4	8:28	Sacred Heart	Chris Rogers 25 yard field goal	Sacred Heart 10–7

- Sacred Heart was coming off of a NEC championship and a First Round loss to Fordham in 2013.
- Delaware's first FCS non-conference loss since January 7, 2011 (v. Eastern Washington, in the National Championship game).
- Delaware's first regular season FCS non-conference loss since September 20, 2008 (at Furman).
- Delaware's first home non-conference loss since September 16, 2006 (v. Albany).
- Sacred Heart went on to win the NEC championship and fall in the NCAA First Round to Fordham.

=== Elon ===
Parents & Family Weekend

Team	1	2	3	4	Total
Phoenix	0	3	14	7	24
• Blue Hens	6	21	0	7	34

- Location: Delaware Stadium
  Newark, Delaware
- Game start: 3:36 PM
- Elapsed time: 3:07
- Game attendance: 19,476
- Game weather: Temp: 54 • Wind: 8 NNE • Weather: Overcast
- Referee: Mike Sechrist

Scoring summary
1	7:29	Delaware	Nick Boyle 1 yard pass from Trent Hurley (kick failed)	Delaware 6–0
2	12:11	Elon	John Gallagher 37 yard field goal	Delaware 6–3
2	5:00	Delaware	Wes Hills 1 yard run (Garrett Greenway kick)	Delaware 13–3
2	2:25	Delaware	Jalen Randolph 1 yard run (Garrett Greenway kick)	Delaware 20–3
2	2:11	Delaware	Malcolm Brown 20 yard interception return (Garrett Greenway kick)	Delaware 27–3
3	10:58	Elon	Justin Osborne 5 yard pass from Mike Quinn (John Gallagher kick)	Delaware 27–10
3	0:24	Elon	Tre Lennon 10 yard pass from Mike Quinn (John Gallagher kick)	Delaware 27–17
4	10:56	Delaware	Trent Hurley 6 yard run (Garrett Greenway kick)	Delaware 34–17
4	8:58	Elon	Tre Lennon 35 yard pass from Mike Quinn (John Gallagher kick)	Delaware 34–24

=== Towson ===
Homecoming

Team	1	2	3	4	Total
• Tigers	7	0	3	14	24
Blue Hens	7	7	0	3	17

- Location: Delaware Stadium
  Newark, Delaware
- Game start: 12:30 PM
- Elapsed time: 3:10
- Game attendance: 17,718
- Game weather: Temp: 66 • Wind: 14 N • Weather: Sunny
- Referee: Henry Wimberg
- Television network: Comcast SportsNet

Scoring summary
1	9:53	Delaware	Trent Hurley 1 yard run (Garrett Greenway kick)	Delaware 7–0
1	3:51	Towson	Andre Dessenberg 1 yard pass from Connor Frazier (Sam Hurwitz kick)	Tied 7–7
2	10:36	Delaware	Trent Hurley 1 yard run (Garrett Greenway kick)	Delaware 14–7
3	5:20	Towson	Sam Hurwitz 27 yard field goal	Delaware 14–10
4	8:23	Delaware	Garrett Greenway 38 yard field goal	Delaware 17–10
4	5:23	Towson	Spencer Wilkins 39 yard pass from Connor Frazier (Sam Hurwitz kick)	Tied 17–17
4	0:49	Towson	Darius Victor 17 yard run (Sam Hurwitz kick)	Towson 24–17

- Towson was coming off a loss in the National Championship Game to North Dakota State in 2013.
- First Homecoming loss since October 31, 2009 to James Madison (20–8).

=== William & Mary ===
Team	1	2	3	4	Total
Blue Hens	0	7	7	3	17
• #18 Tribe	0	10	14	7	31

- Location: Zable Stadium
  Williamsburg, Virginia
- Game start: 12:30 PM
- Game attendance: 7,614
- Game weather: Temp: • Wind: • Weather:
- Television network: Comcast SportsNet

Scoring summary
2	14:14	William & Mary	Darnell Laws 1 yard pass from Steve Cluley (Nick Dorka kick)	William & Mary 7–0
2	4:46	Delaware	Jerel Harrison 31 yard pass from Trent Hurley (Garrett Greenway kick)	Tied 7–7
2	0:06	William & Mary	Nick Dorka 36 yard field goal	William & Mary 10–7
3	8:32	William & Mary	Mikal Abdul-Saboor 2 yard run (Nick Dorka kick)	William & Mary 17–7
3	1:52	William & Mary	DeVonte Dedmon 22 yard run (Nick Dorka kick)	William & Mary 24–7
3	0:00	Delaware	Jalen Randolph 49 yard run (Garrett Greenway kick)	William & Mary 24–14
4	9:23	William & Mary	Mikal Abdul-Saboor 2 yard run (Nick Dorka kick)	William & Mary 31–14
4	5:16	Delaware	Garrett Greenway 28 yard field goal	William & Mary 31–17

=== Rhode Island ===
Team	1	2	3	4	Total
Rams	0	7	6	0	13
• Blue Hens	14	7	7	0	28

- Location: Delaware Stadium
  Newark, Delaware
- Game start: 12:00 PM
- Game attendance: 12,798
- Game weather: Temp: • Wind: • Weather: Rain

=== Albany ===
Team	1	2	3	4	Total
• Blue Hens	0	7	21	3	31
Great Danes	0	14	0	14	28

- Location: Bob Ford Field
  Albany, New York
- Game start: 3:30 PM
- Elapsed time: 3:00
- Game attendance: 4,674
- Game weather: Temp: 47 • Wind: N 4 • Weather: Clear
- Referee: Warren Gillis

Scoring summary
2	11:33	Delaware	Jalen Randolph 1 yard run (Garrett Greenway kick)	Delaware 7–0
2	9:57	Albany	Cole King 16 yard pass from Will Fiacchi (Patrick Toole kick)	Tied 7–7
2	4:32	Albany	Nic Ketter 38 yard pass from Will Fiacchi (Patrick Toole kick)	Albany 14–7
3	10:52	Delaware	Eric Enderson 2 yard run (Garrett Greenway kick)	Tied 14–14
3	9:11	Delaware	Jerel Harrison 16 yard pass from Trent Hurley (Garrett Greenway kick)	Delaware 21–14
3	2:57	Delaware	Wes Hills 4 yard run (Garrett Greenway kick)	Delaware 28–14
4	14:55	Albany	Josh Gontarek 29 yard pass from Will Fiacchi (Patrick Toole kick)	Delaware 28–21
4	1:34	Delaware	Garrett Greenway 31 yard field goal	Delaware 31–21
4	0:33	Albany	Josh Gontarek 19 yard pass from Will Fiacchi (Patrick Toole kick)	Delaware 31–28

=== New Hampshire ===
Team	1	2	3	4	Total
Blue Hens	0	7	7	0	14
• #1 Wildcats	10	7	13	13	43

- Location: Cowell Stadium
  Durham, New Hampshire
- Game start: 1:00 PM
- Game attendance: 8,199
- Game weather: Temp: • Wind: • Weather:
- New Hampshire was coming off a Semifinal loss to North Dakota State in 2013.
- New Hampshire went on to win the CAA championship and fall to Illinois State in the NCAA Semifinals.

=== Villanova ===
Battle of the Blue

Team	1	2	3	4	Total
• #6 Wildcats	13	7	7	8	35
Blue Hens	0	7	7	14	28

- Location: Delaware Stadium
  Newark, Delaware
- Game start: 12:00 PM
- Elapsed time: 3:09
- Game attendance: 17,056
- Game weather: Temp: 40 • Wind: 11 SW • Weather: Sunny, Cold
- Referee: Kelvin Hudson

Scoring summary
1	10:52	Villanova	Kevin Monangai 2 yard run (Steve Weyler kick)	Villanova 7–0
1	5:44	Villanova	Kevin Monangai 3 yard pass from John Robertson (kick blocked)	Villanova 13–0
2	14:05	Villanova	Poppy Livers 42 yard pass from John Robertson (Steve Weyler kick)	Villanova 20–0
2	10:24	Delaware	Nick Boyle 10 yard pass from Trent Hurley (Garrett Greenway kick)	Villanova 20–7
3	6:06	Villanova	Kevin Monangai 1 yard run (Steve Weyler kick)	Villanova 27–7
3	2:42	Delaware	Jalen Randolph 3 yard run (Garrett Greenway kick)	Villanova 27–14
4	9:56	Delaware	Jalen Randolph 6 yard pass from Trent Hurley (Garrett Greenway kick)	Villanova 27–21
4	2:04	Delaware	Jalen Randolph 1 yard run (Garrett Greenway kick)	Delaware 28–27
4	0:23	Villanova	Kevin Gulyas 21 yard pass from John Robertson (Poppy Livers pass from John Robertson)	Villanova 35–28

- Villanova went on to fall in the NCAA Quarterfinals to Sam Houston State.

== Ranking movements ==
Ranking movements Legend: ██ Increase in ranking ██ Decrease in ranking — = Not ranked RV = Received votes
	Week														
Poll	Pre	1	2	3	4	5	6	7	8	9	10	11	12	13	Final
Sports Network	RV	RV	RV	RV	25	24	RV	RV	RV	RV	RV	—	—	—	—
Coaches	RV	RV	—	—	—	RV	RV	RV	—	—	—	—	—	—	—
