= 2014 Colonial Athletic Association football season =

2014 CAA football season
- League: NCAA Division I FCS (Football Championship Subdivision)
- Sport: Football
- Duration: August 28, 2014 – December 20, 2014
- Teams: 12
- TV partner(s): NBCSN; Comcast SportsNet; American Sports Network; CAA.TV
- Season champions: New Hampshire

CAA football seasons
- ← 2013 2015 →

2014 Colonial Athletic Association football standings
	Conf.			Overall
Team	W		L	W		L
No. 3 New Hampshire $^	8	–	0	12	–	2
No. 7 Villanova ^	7	–	1	11	–	3
No. 18 James Madison ^	6	–	2	9	–	4
No. 16 Richmond ^	5	–	3	9	–	5
William & Mary	4	–	4	7	–	5
Delaware	4	–	4	6	–	6
Maine	4	–	4	5	–	6
Stony Brook	4	–	4	5	–	7
Albany	3	–	5	7	–	5
Towson	2	–	6	4	–	8
Rhode Island	1	–	7	1	–	11
Elon	0	–	8	1	–	11
$ – Conference champion; ^ – FCS playoff participant; Rankings from The Sports Network poll

The 2014 Colonial Athletic Association football season was the eighth season of football for the Colonial Athletic Association (CAA) and part of the 2014 NCAA Division I FCS football season. It was the first season for Elon in the CAA after being a member of the Southern Conference. New Hampshire went undefeated conference play, winning the CAA with a record of 8–0.

== Head coaches ==
- Greg Gattuso, Albany – 1st year
- Dave Brock, Delaware – 2nd year
- Rich Skrosky, Elon – 1st year
- Everett Withers, James Madison – 1st year
- Jack Cosgrove, Maine – 22nd year
- Sean McDonnell, New Hampshire – 16th year
- Jim Fleming, Rhode Island – 1st year
- Danny Rocco, Richmond – 3rd year
- Chuck Priore, Stony Brook – 9th year
- Rob Ambrose, Towson – 6th year
- Andy Talley, Villanova – 30th year
- Jimmye Laycock, William & Mary – 35th year

== Preseason poll results ==
First place votes in parentheses

Place	School
1	New Hampshire (15)
2	Villanova (2)
3	Richmond (3)
4	William & Mary (3)
5	Towson
6	Delaware
7	Maine
8	James Madison (1)
9	Stony Brook
10	Albany
11	Rhode Island
12	Elon

== Rankings ==
Legend
	Increase in ranking
	Decrease in ranking
	Not ranked previous week
RV	Receiving votes

		Pre	Wk 1	Wk 2	Wk 3	Wk 4	Wk 5	Wk 6	Wk 7	Wk 8	Wk 9	Wk 10	Wk 11	Wk 12	Wk 13	Final
Albany	TSN	–	–	RV	RV	24	23	RV	RV	25	23	RV	RV	RV	RV	RV
Albany	C	–	–	RV	RV	RV	RV	RV	–	RV	RV	RV	–	–	–	–
Delaware	TSN	RV	RV	RV	RV	25	24	RV	RV	RV	RV	RV	–	–	–	–
Delaware	C	RV	RV	–	–	–	RV	RV	RV	–	–	–	–	–	–	–
Elon	TSN	–	–	–	–	–	–	–	–	–	–	–	–	–	–	–
Elon	C	–	–	–	–	–	–	–	–	–	–	–	–	–	–	–
James Madison	TSN	RV	RV	RV	RV	RV	RV	RV	RV	RV	RV	RV	25	17	15	18
James Madison	C	RV	RV	RV	RV	–	–	–	RV	–	–	RV	RV	22	15	19
Maine	TSN	25	24	23	RV	RV	RV	RV	–	–	–	–	–	–	–	–
Maine	C	20	22	20	RV	–	–	–	–	–	–	–	–	–	–	–
New Hampshire	TSN	4	6	7	7	4	4	4	3	3	2	2	1	1	1	3
New Hampshire	C	4	8	9	9	7	6	6	5	5	4	3	2	2	1	3
Rhode Island	TSN	–	–	–	–	–	–	–	–	–	–	–	–	–	–	
Rhode Island	C	–	–	–	–	–	–	–	–	–	–	–	–	–	–	
Richmond	TSN	20	17	18	17	20	20	22	19	16	13	8	14	21	18	16
Richmond	C	24	20	21	18	21	21	21	20	17	14	8	14	21	16	16
Stony Brook	TSN	–	–	–	–	–	–	–	–	–	–	–	–	–	–	–
Stony Brook	C	–	–	–	–	–	–	–	–	–	–	–	–	–	–	–
Towson	TSN	13	22	RV	RV	RV	RV	RV	RV	–	–	–	–	–	–	–
Towson	C	7	19	RV	RV	RV	RV	RV	–	–	–	–	–	–	–	–
Villanova	TSN	12	10	8	8	6	6	6	5	5	4	7	6	6	5	7
Villanova	C	13	7	7	7	5	5	5	4	4	3	7	6	6	5	7
William & Mary	TSN	19	21	16	13	12	12	10	15	18	17	24	24	22	23	RV
William & Mary	C	22	24	19	17	13	13	11	18	20	17	25	23	19	24	24

== Regular season ==
Index to colors and formatting
CAA member won
CAA member lost
CAA teams in **bold**

All times Eastern time.

Rankings reflect that of the Sports Network poll for that week.

=== Week One ===
Date	Time	Visiting team	Home team	Site	TV	Result	Attendance	Reference
August 28	7:00 PM	Bryant	**Stony Brook**	Kenneth P. LaValle Stadium • Stony Brook, NY		**L** 7–13	10,252	
August 29	7:30 PM	**#12 Villanova**	Syracuse	Carrier Dome • Syracuse, NY	ESPN3	**L** 26–27 (2OT)	41,189	
August 30	12:00 PM	**Delaware**	Pittsburgh	Heinz Field • Pittsburgh, PA	ESPN3	**L** 0–62	40,549	
August 30	3:30 PM	**James Madison**	Maryland	Byrd Stadium • College Park, MD	BTN	**L** 7–52	45,080	
August 30	4:00 PM	**#19 William & Mary**	Virginia Tech	Lane Stadium • Blacksburg, VA	ESPNews	**L** 9–34	62,722	
August 30	6:00 PM	**Elon**	Duke	Wallace Wade Stadium • Durham, NC	ESPN3	**L** 13–52	31,213	
August 30	6:00 PM	Morehead State	**#20 Richmond**	E. Claiborne Robins Stadium • Richmond, VA		**W** 55–10	7,725	
August 30	6:00 PM	Norfolk State	**#25 Maine**	Alfond Stadium • Orono, ME		**W** 10–6	6,951	
August 30	6:00 PM	Central Connecticut	**#13 Towson**	Johnny Unitas Stadium • Towson, MD		**L** 27–31	8,058	
August 30	6:00 PM	Holy Cross	**Albany**	Bob Ford Field • Albany, NY	ESPN3	**W** 14–13	6,748	
August 30	7:00 PM	**#4 New Hampshire**	Toledo	Glass Bowl • Toledo, OH	ESPN3	**L** 20–54	20,184	

Players of the week:

Offensive		Defensive		Freshman		Special teams	
Player	Team	Player	Team	Player	Team	Player	Team
Michael Strauss	Richmond	Neil Morrison	Albany	Jeremiah Hamlin	Richmond	John Carpenter	William & Mary

=== Week Two ===
Date	Time	Visiting team	Home team	Site	TV	Result	Attendance	Reference
September 6	12:00 PM	**Stony Brook**	Connecticut	Rentschler Field • East Hartford, CT	ESPN GamePlan	**L** 16–19	23,543	
September 6	12:30 PM	**James Madison**	Lehigh	Goodman Stadium • Bethlehem, PA		**W** 31–28	6,519	
September 6	3:30 PM	**#17 Richmond**	Virginia	Scott Stadium • Charlottesville, VA	ESPN3	**L** 13–45	34,553	
September 6	3:30 PM	#11 Fordham	**#10 Villanova**	Villanova Stadium • Villanova, PA	ASN	**W** 50–6	6,151	
September 6	6:00 PM	**#21 William & Mary**	Hampton	Armstrong Stadium • Hampton, VA		**W** 42–14	3,338	
September 6	6:00 PM	Central Connecticut	**Albany**	Arute Field • New Britain, CT		**W** 19–0	4,150	
September 6	7:00 PM	**Rhode Island**	Marshall	Joan C. Edwards Stadium • Huntington, WV	ASN	**L** 7–48	25,106	
September 6	7:30 PM	**#22 Towson**	West Virginia	Mountaineer Field • Morgantown, WV		**L** 0–54	56,414	
September 7	12:00 PM	Delaware State	**Delaware**	Delaware Stadium • Newark, DE		**W** 27–9	12,511	

Players of the week:

Offensive		Defensive		Freshman		Special teams	
Player	Team	Player	Team	Player	Team	Player	Team
John Robertson	Villanova	Airek Green	William & Mary	John Miller	James Madison	Jimmy Moreland	James Madison

=== Week Three ===
Date	Time	Visiting team	Home team	Site	TV	Result	Attendance	Reference
September 13	1:00 PM	**#23 Maine**	Bryant	Bulldog Stadium • Smithfield, RI		**L** 10–13	3,291	
September 13	1:00 PM	**Rhode Island**	#19 Fordham	Coffey Field • The Bronx, NY		**L** 7–54	6,979	
September 13	2:00 PM	**Towson**	Delaware State	Alumni Stadium • Dover, DE		**W** 21–7	2,588	
September 13	3:30 PM	Lehigh	**#7 New Hampshire**	Cowell Stadium • Durham, NH	ASN	**W** 45–27	9,358	
September 13	4:00 PM	Saint Francis (PA)	**James Madison**	Bridgeforth Stadium • Harrisonburg, VA		**W** 38–22	23,577	
September 13	6:00 PM	American International	**Stony Brook**	Kenneth P. LaValle Stadium • Stony Brook, NY		**W** 20–3	5,109	
September 13	6:00 PM	North Carolina A&T	**Elon**	Rhodes Stadium • Elon, NC		**L** 12–17	7,228	
September 13	6:00 PM	Hampton	**#18 Richmond**	E. Claiborne Robins Stadium • Richmond, VA		**W** 42–17	7,802	
September 13	6:00 PM	Colgate	**Delaware**	Delaware Stadium • Newark, DE		**W** 28–25	15,319	
September 13	7:00 PM	Norfolk State	**#16 William & Mary**	Zable Stadium • Williamsburg, VA		**W** 29–14	8,254	

Players of the week:

Offensive		Defensive		Freshman		Special teams	
Player	Team	Player	Team	Player	Team	Player	Team
Sean Goldrich	New Hampshire	Sage Harold	James Madison	James Simms	Towson	Derrick Joseph	Towson

=== Week Four ===
Date	Time	Visiting team	Home team	Site	TV	Result	Attendance	Reference
September 20	12:30 PM	**James Madison**	**#8 Villanova**	Villanova Stadium • Villanova, PA	CSN	**VIL** 49–31	10,781	
September 20	1:00 PM	**Albany**	**Rhode Island**	Meade Stadium • Kingston, RI		**ALB** 37–20	6,351	
September 20	1:00 PM	**Maine**	Boston College	Alumni Stadium • Chestnut Hill, MA	ESPN3	**L** 10–40	28,676	
September 20	4:00 PM	**#7 New Hampshire**	**#17 Richmond**	E. Claiborne Robins Stadium • Richmond, VA	CSN	**UNH** 29–26	8,404	
September 20	6:00 PM	North Carolina Central	**Towson**	Johnny Unitas Stadium • Towson, MD		**W** 31–20	9,364	
September 20	7:00 PM	**Stony Brook**	North Dakota	Alerus Center • Grand Forks, ND		**L** 3–13	7,030	
September 20	7:00 PM	Lafayette	**#13 William & Mary**	Zable Stadium • Williamsburg, VA		**W** 33–19	9,137	
September 20	7:00 PM	Charlotte	**Elon**	Rhodes Stadium • Elon, NC		**W** 20–13	11,203	

Players of the week:

Offensive		Defensive		Freshman		Special teams	
Player	Team	Player	Team	Player	Team	Player	Team
John Robertson	Villanova	Odell Benton	Elon	Josh Gontarek	Albany	Patrick Toole	Albany

=== Week Five ===
Date	Time	Visiting team	Home team	Site	TV	Result	Attendance	Reference
September 27	3:00 PM	**#6 Villanova**	Penn	Franklin Field • Philadelphia, PA		**W** 41–7	12,353	
September 27	4:00 PM	**#25 Delaware**	**James Madison**	Bridgeforth Stadium • Harrisonburg, VA	CSN	**DEL** 30–23 (OT)	20,592	
September 27	4:00 PM	**Rhode Island**	Central Connecticut	Arute Field • New Britain, CT		**L** 14–38	4,022	
September 27	6:00 PM	Columbia	**#24 Albany**	Bob Ford Field • Albany, NY		**W** 42–7	5,107	
September 27	6:00 PM	**#12 William & Mary**	**Stony Brook**	Kenneth P. LaValle Stadium • Stony Brook, NY		**W&M** 27–21 (OT)	11,301	
September 27	6:00 PM	Dartmouth	**#4 New Hampshire**	Cowell Stadium • Durham, NH		**W** 52–19	8,753	
September 27	7:00 PM	**Elon**	Coastal Carolina	Brooks Stadium • Conway, SC		**L** 3–31	9,538	
September 27	7:00 PM	**Maine**	**Towson**	Johnny Unitas Stadium • Towson, MD	CSN	**MAI** 27–24	6,031	

Players of the week:

Offensive		Defensive		Freshman		Special teams	
Player	Team	Player	Team	Player	Team	Player	Team
Andy Vailas	New Hampshire	Rayshan Clark	Albany	Nigel Beckford	Maine	Kendell Anderson	William & Mary

=== Week Six ===
Date	Time	Visiting team	Home team	Site	TV	Result	Attendance	Reference
October 4	12:30 PM	**#6 Villanova**	**Maine**	Alfond Stadium • Orono, ME		**VIL** 41–20	5,173	
October 4	1:00 PM	Brown	**Rhode Island**	Meade Stadium • Kingston, RI		**L** 13–20	4,205	
October 4	1:30 PM	**#4 New Hampshire**	**Elon**	Rhodes Stadium • Elon, NC		**UNH** 48–14	6,141	
October 4	3:30 PM	Sacred Heart	**#24 Delaware**	Delaware Stadium • Newark, DE		**L** 7–10	14,894	
October 4	3:30 PM	**Stony Brook**	**Towson**	Johnny Unitas Stadium • Towson, MD	CSN	**SBU** 14–3	6,517	
October 4	6:00 PM	**James Madison**	**#23 Albany**	Bob Ford Field • Albany, NY		**JMU** 31–28	3,284	
October 4	7:00 PM	**#20 Richmond**	Liberty	Williams Stadium • Lynchburg, VA	ESPN3	**W** 46–39 (2OT)	20,838	

Players of the week:

Offensive		Defensive		Freshman		Special teams	
Player	Team	Player	Team	Player	Team	Player	Team
John Robertson	Villanova	Don Cherry	Villanova	Donald Goodrich; Josh Gontarek	New Hampshire; Albany	Eric Enderson	Delaware

=== Week Seven ===
Date	Time	Visiting team	Home team	Site	TV	Result	Attendance	Reference
October 11	12:30 PM	Towson	James Madison	Bridgeforth Stadium • Harrisonburg, VA	CSN	**JMU** 62–7	24,113	
October 11	1:00 PM	Rhode Island	#6 Villanova	Villanova Stadium • Villanova, PA		**VIL** 44–21	3,611	
October 11	3:30 PM	#22 Richmond	Albany	Bob Ford Field • Albany, NY		**RIC** 41–28	8,500	
October 11	3:30 PM	#10 William & Mary	#4 New Hampshire	Cowell Stadium • Durham, NH	NBCSN	**UNH** 32–3	18,774	
October 11	3:30 PM	Elon	Delaware	Delaware Stadium • Newark, DE		**DEL** 34–24	19,476	
October 11	7:00 PM	Maine	Stony Brook	Kenneth P. LaValle Stadium • Stony Brook, NY	ASN	**SBU** 19–7	5,842	

Players of the week:

Offensive		Defensive		Freshman		Special teams	
Player	Team	Player	Team	Player	Team	Player	Team
John Robertson	Villanova	Brandon Lee	James Madison	Jimmy Moreland	James Madison	Ryan Farrell	New Hampshire

=== Week Eight ===
Date	Time	Visiting team	Home team	Site	TV	Result	Attendance	Reference
October 18	12:30 PM	**Albany**	**Maine**	Alfond Stadium • Orono, ME		**ALB** 20–7	7,464	
October 18	12:30 PM	**Towson**	**Delaware**	Delaware Stadium • Newark, DE	CSN	**TOW** 24–17	17,718	
October 18	1:30 PM	**Stony Brook**	**Elon**	Rhodes Stadium • Elon, NC		**SBU** 20–3	6,120	
October 18	3:30 PM	**Rhode Island**	**#19 Richmond**	E. Claiborne Robins Stadium • Richmond, VA	ASN	**RIC** 37–0	7,837	
October 18	3:30 PM	**#5 Villanova**	**#15 William & Mary**	Zable Stadium • Williamsburg, VA		**VIL** 35–31	10,764	

Players of the week:

Offensive		Defensive		Freshman		Special teams	
Player	Team	Player	Team	Player	Team	Player	Team
John Robertson	Villanova	Christian Dorsey	Albany	James Simms	Towson	Patrick Toole	Albany

=== Week Nine ===
Date	Time	Visiting team	Home team	Site	TV	Result	Attendance	Reference
October 25	12:00 PM	**Maine**	**Rhode Island**	Meade Stadium • Kingston, RI	ASN	**MAI** 20–14	6,316	
October 25	12:00 PM	**James Madison**	Charlotte	Jerry Richardson Stadium • Charlotte, NC		**W** 48–40	15,677	
October 25	12:30 PM	**Delaware**	**#18 William & Mary**	Zable Stadium • Williamsburg, VA	CSN	**W&M** 31–17	7,614	
October 25	3:00 PM	**Stony Brook**	**#3 New Hampshire**	Cowell Stadium • Durham, NH		**UNH** 28–20	8,811	
October 25	3:00 PM	**#16 Richmond**	**Elon**	Rhodes Stadium • Elon, NC		**RIC** 30–10	5,042	
October 25	3:30 PM	Colgate	**#25 Albany**	Bob Ford Field • Albany, NY		**W** 24–17	4,952	
October 25	3:30 PM	Morgan State	**#5 Villanova**	Villanova Stadium • Villanova, PA		**W** 48–28	7,821	

Players of the week:

Offensive		Defensive		Freshman		Special teams	
Player	Team	Player	Team	Player	Team	Player	Team
Vad Lee	James Madison	Andrew Bose	Rhode Island	Nigel Beckford	Maine	Myles Holmes	Rhode Island

=== Week Ten ===
Date	Time	Visiting team	Home team	Site	TV	Result	Attendance	Reference
November 1	12:00 PM	**Rhode Island**	**Delaware**	Delaware Stadium • Newark, DE		**DEL** 28–13	12,798	
November 1	12:00 PM	**#4 Villanova**	**#13 Richmond**	E. Claiborne Robins Stadium • Richmond, VA	CSN	**RIC** 10–9	7,902	
November 1	3:30 PM	**#17 William & Mary**	**James Madison**	Bridgeforth Stadium • Harrisonburg, VA	ASN	**JMU** 31–24	21,778	
November 1	4:00 PM	**Elon**	**Towson**	Johnny Unitas Stadium • Towson, MD		**TOW** 21–19	7,665	
November 1	6:00 PM	**#23 Albany**	**#2 New Hampshire**	Cowell Stadium • Durham, NH		**UNH** 49–24	3,536	

Players of the week:

Offensive		Defensive		Freshman		Special teams	
Player	Team	Player	Team	Player	Team	Player	Team
R.J. Harris	New Hampshire	Sage Harold; Omar Howard	James Madison; Richmond	Josh Gontarek	Albany	Kendell Anderson	William & Mary

=== Week Eleven ===
Date	Time	Visiting team	Home team	Site	TV	Result	Attendance	Reference
November 8	12:30 PM	#2 New Hampshire	Rhode Island	Meade Stadium • Kingston, RI		**UNH** 41–14	7,210	
November 8	12:30 PM	#8 Richmond	Maine	Alfond Stadium • Orono, ME		**MAI** 33–20	4,675	
November 8	1:00 PM	James Madison	Stony Brook	Kenneth P. LaValle Stadium • Stony Brook, NY		**JMU** 27–24	5,115	
November 8	3:30 PM	Elon	#24 William & Mary	Zable Stadium • Williamsburg, VA	CSN	**W&M** 17–7	9,512	
November 8	3:30 PM	Delaware	Albany	Bob Ford Field • Albany, NY		**DEL** 31–28	4,674	
November 8	7:00 PM	Towson	#7 Villanova	Villanova Stadium • Villanova, PA		**VIL** 42–14	4,529	

Players of the week:

Offensive		Defensive		Freshman		Special teams	
Player	Team	Player	Team	Player	Team	Player	Team
Vad Lee	James Madison	Joe Sarnese	Villanova	Josh Gontarek	Albany	Benjamin Davis	Maine

=== Week Twelve ===
Date	Time	Visiting team	Home team	Site	TV	Result	Attendance	Reference
November 15	12:30 PM	#25 James Madison	#14 Richmond	E. Claiborne Robins Stadium • Richmond, VA	NBCSN	**JMU** 55–20	8,700	
November 15	1:00 PM	Delaware	#1 New Hampshire	Cowell Stadium • Durham, NH		**UNH** 43–14	8,199	
November 15	1:00 PM	Rhode Island	Stony Brook	Kenneth P. LaValle Stadium • Stony Brook, NY		**SBU** 35–14	5,010	
November 15	3:00 PM	Maine	Elon	Rhodes Stadium • Elon, NC		**MAI** 24–17	5,022	
November 15	3:00 PM	#24 William & Mary	Towson	Johnny Unitas Stadium • Towson, MD	CSN	**W&M** 37–14	6,091	
November 15	7:00 PM	Albany	#6 Villanova	Villanova Stadium • Villanova, PA	ASN	**VIL** 48–31	4,541	

Players of the week:

Offensive		Defensive		Freshman		Special teams	
Player	Team	Player	Team	Player	Team	Player	Team
John Robertson	Villanova	Taylor Reynolds	James Madison	Tyrice Beverette; Nigel Beckford	Stony Brook; Maine	John Carpenter	William & Mary

=== Week Thirteen ===
Date	Time	Visiting team	Home team	Site	TV	Result	Attendance	Reference
November 22	12:00 PM	Elon	#17 James Madison	Bridgeforth Stadium • Harrisonburg, VA	ASN	**JMU** 59–27	15,793	
November 22	12:00 PM	#6 Villanova	Delaware	Delaware Stadium • Newark, DE		**VIL** 35–28	17,056	
November 22	12:30 PM	Towson	Rhode Island	Meade Stadium • Kingston, RI		**URI** 13–7	2,501	
November 22	3:30 PM	Stony Brook	Albany	Bob Ford Field • Albany, NY		**ALB** 27–17	4,123	
November 22	3:30 PM	#1 New Hampshire	Maine	Alfond Stadium • Orono, ME	NBCSN	**UNH** 20–12	4,023	
November 22	7:30 PM	#21 Richmond	#22 William & Mary	Zable Stadium • Williamsburg, VA	NBCSN	**RIC** 34–20	8,665	

Players of the week:

Offensive		Defensive		Freshman		Special teams	
Player	Team	Player	Team	Player	Team	Player	Team
Vad Lee	James Madison	Kyle Sakowski	Albany	Jimmy Moreland	James Madison	Dylan Smith	Rhode Island

=== FCS playoffs ===
Date	Time	Visiting team	Home team	Site	TV	Result	Attendance	Reference
November 29	1:00 PM	Morgan State	**#18 Richmond**	E. Claiborne Robins Stadium • Richmond, VA	ESPN3	**W** 46–24	4,126	
November 29	4:00 PM	#20 Liberty	**#15 James Madison**	Bridgeforth Stadium • Harrisonburg, VA	ESPN3	**L** 21–26	13,040	
December 6	1:00 PM	#9 Fordham	**#1 New Hampshire**	Cowell Stadium • Durham, NH	ESPN3	**W** 44–19	4,021	
December 6	1:00 PM	**#18 Richmond**	#6 Coastal Carolina	Brooks Stadium • Conway, SC	ESPN3	**L** 15–36	5,601	
December 6	4:30 PM	#20 Liberty	**#5 Villanova**	Villanova Stadium • Villanova, PA	ESPN3	**W** 29–22	3,113	
December 12	8:00 PM	#8 Chattanooga	**#1 New Hampshire**	Cowell Stadium • Durham, NH	ESPN2	**W** 35–30	6,380	
December 13	1:00 PM	#19 Sam Houston State	**#5 Villanova**	Villanova Stadium • Villanova, PA	ESPN3	**L** 31–34	2,333	
December 20	2:00 PM	#7 Illinois State	**#1 New Hampshire**	Cowell Stadium • Durham, NH	ESPNU	**L** 18–21	9,497	

== Records against other conferences ==
=== CAA vs. FCS conferences ===
Conference	Record
Big Sky	0–1
Big South	2–3
Ivy League	3–1
Independents	2–0
MEAC	9–0
MVFC	0–1
NEC	2–5
Patriot	8–1
Pioneer	1–0
Southern	1–0
Southland	0–1
Total	28–13

=== CAA vs. FBS conferences ===
Conference	Record
American	0–1
ACC	0–6
Big 12	0–1
Big Ten	0–1
C–USA	0–1
MAC	0–1
Total	0–11

== Attendance ==
Team	Stadium	Capacity	Game 1	Game 2	Game 3	Game 4	Game 5	Game 6	Game 7	Game 8	Game 9	Total	Average	% of Capacity
Albany	Bob Ford Field	8,500	6,748	5,107	3,284	8,500	4,952	4,123				32,714	5,452	64%
Delaware	Delaware Stadium	22,000	12,511	15,319	14,894	19,476	17,718	12,798	17,056			109,772	15,682	71%
Elon	Rhodes Stadium	11,250	7,228	11,203	6,141	6,120	5,042	5,022				40,756	6,793	60%
James Madison	Bridgeforth Stadium	24,877	23,577	20,592	24,113	21,778	15,793	13,040				118,893	19,816	80%
Maine	Alfond Stadium	10,000	6,951	5,173	7,464	4,675	4,023					28,286	5,657	57%
New Hampshire	Cowell Stadium	6,500	9,358	8,753	18,774	8,811	3,536	8,199	4,021	6,380	9,497	69,130	7,681	118%
Rhode Island	Meade Stadium	6,555	6,351	4,205	6,316	7,210	2,501					26,583	5,317	81%
Richmond	E. Claiborne Robins Stadium	8,700	7,725	7,802	8,404	7,837	7,902	8,700	4,126			52,496	7,499	86%
Stony Brook	Kenneth P. LaValle Stadium	8,136	10,252	5,109	11,301	5,842	5,115	5,010				42,629	7,105	87%
Towson	Johnny Unitas Stadium	11,198	8,058	9,364	6,031	14,894	7,665	6,091				52,103	8,684	78%
Villanova	Villanova Stadium	12,000	6,151	10,781	3,611	7,821	4,529	4,541	3,113	2,333		42,880	5,360	45%
William & Mary	Zable Stadium	11,686	8,254	9,137	10,764	7,614	9,512	8,655				53,936	8,989	77%

== NFL draft ==
The following list includes all CAA players who were drafted in the 2015 NFL draft.

Round #	Pick #	NFL team	Player	Position	College
5	170	Seattle Seahawks	Tye Smith	CB	William & Mary
5	171	Baltimore Ravens	Nick Boyle	TE	Delaware
7	245	Tennessee Titans	Tre McBride	WR	William & Mary
