= 2014 Towson Tigers football team =

American college football season

2014 Towson Tigers football
- Conference: Colonial Athletic Association
- Record: 4–8 (2–6 CAA)
- Head coach: Rob Ambrose (6th season)
- Offensive coordinator: Jared Ambrose (3rd season)
- Defensive coordinator: Matt Hachmann (5th season)
- Home stadium: Johnny Unitas Stadium

2014 Colonial Athletic Association football standings
	Conf.			Overall
Team	W		L	W		L
No. 3 New Hampshire $^	8	–	0	12	–	2
No. 7 Villanova ^	7	–	1	11	–	3
No. 18 James Madison ^	6	–	2	9	–	4
No. 16 Richmond ^	5	–	3	9	–	5
William & Mary	4	–	4	7	–	5
Delaware	4	–	4	6	–	6
Maine	4	–	4	5	–	6
Stony Brook	4	–	4	5	–	7
Albany	3	–	5	7	–	5
Towson	2	–	6	4	–	8
Rhode Island	1	–	7	1	–	11
Elon	0	–	8	1	–	11
$ – Conference champion; ^ – FCS playoff participant; Rankings from The Sports Network poll

The 2014 Towson Tigers football team represented Towson University in the 2014 NCAA Division I FCS football season. They were led by sixth-year head coach Rob Ambrose and played their home games at Johnny Unitas Stadium. As members of the Colonial Athletic Association, they finished the season 4–8, 2–6 in CAA play to finish in tenth place.

== Schedule ==
Date	Time	Opponent	Rank	Site	TV	Result	Attendance
August 30	6:00 pm	Central Connecticut*	No. 13	Johnny Unitas Stadium; Towson, MD		L 27–31	8,058
September 6	7:30 pm	at West Virginia*	No. 22	Mountaineer Field; Morgantown, WV	RTPT	L 0–54	56,414
September 13	2:00 pm	at Delaware State*		Alumni Stadium; Dover, DE		W 21–7	2,588
September 20	6:00 pm	North Carolina Central*		Johnny Unitas Stadium; Towson, MD		W 31–20	9,364
September 27	7:00 pm	Maine		Johnny Unitas Stadium; Towson, MD	CSN	L 24–27	6,031
October 4	3:00 pm	Stony Brook		Johnny Unitas Stadium; Towson, MD	CSN	L 3–14	14,894
October 11	12:30 pm	at James Madison		Bridgeforth Stadium; Harrisonburg, VA	CSN	L 7–62	24,113
October 18	12:30 pm	at Delaware		Delaware Stadium; Newark, DE	CSN	W 24–17	17,718
November 1	4:00 pm	Elon^{†}		Johnny Unitas Stadium; Towson, MD		W 21–19	7,665
November 8	7:00 pm	at No. 7 Villanova		Villanova Stadium; Villanova, PA	ASN	L 14–42	4,529
November 15	3:00 pm	No. 24 William & Mary		Johnny Unitas Stadium; Towson, MD	CSN	L 14–37	6,091
November 22	12:30 pm	at Rhode Island		Meade Stadium; Kingston, RI		L 7–13	2,501
*Non-conference game; ^{†}Homecoming; Rankings from The Sports Network Poll released prior to the game; All times are in Eastern time

== Rankings ==
Ranking movements Legend: ██ Increase in ranking ██ Decrease in ranking — = Not ranked RV = Received votes
	Week														
Poll	Pre	1	2	3	4	5	6	7	8	9	10	11	12	13	Final
Sports Network	13	22	RV	RV	RV	RV	RV	RV	—	—	—	—	—	—	—
Coaches	7	19	RV	RV	RV	RV	RV	—	—	—	—	—	—	—	—
