= 2014 New Hampshire Wildcats football team =

American college football season

2014 New Hampshire Wildcats football

CAA champion Lambert Cup winner

FCS Playoffs Semifinals, L 18–21 vs. Illinois State
- Conference: Colonial Athletic Association

Ranking
- Sports Network: No. 3
- FCS Coaches: No. 3
- Record: 12–2 (8–0 CAA)
- Head coach: Sean McDonnell (16th season)
- Offensive coordinator: Ryan Carty (7th season)
- Defensive coordinator: John Lyons (3rd season)
- Home stadium: Cowell Stadium

2014 Colonial Athletic Association football standings
	Conf.			Overall
Team	W		L	W		L
No. 3 New Hampshire $^	8	–	0	12	–	2
No. 7 Villanova ^	7	–	1	11	–	3
No. 18 James Madison ^	6	–	2	9	–	4
No. 16 Richmond ^	5	–	3	9	–	5
William & Mary	4	–	4	7	–	5
Delaware	4	–	4	6	–	6
Maine	4	–	4	5	–	6
Stony Brook	4	–	4	5	–	7
Albany	3	–	5	7	–	5
Towson	2	–	6	4	–	8
Rhode Island	1	–	7	1	–	11
Elon	0	–	8	1	–	11
$ – Conference champion; ^ – FCS playoff participant; Rankings from The Sports Network poll

The 2014 New Hampshire Wildcats football team represented the University of New Hampshire in the 2014 NCAA Division I FCS football season. They were led by 16th-year head coach Sean McDonnell and played their home games at Cowell Stadium. The Wildcat competed as a member of the Colonial Athletic Association (CAA).

Lighting for night games was installed prior to the season, and the Wildcats hosted their first night game on September 27, defeating Dartmouth.

The Wildcats finished their regular season with a record of 12–2 (8–0 in CAA play) to win the CAA championship. They earned the CAA's automatic bid to the FCS Playoffs where they defeated Fordham in the second round and Chattanooga in the quarterfinals before losing to Illinois State in the semifinals.

== Schedule ==
Date	Time	Opponent	Rank	Site	TV	Result	Attendance
August 30	7:00 pm	at Toledo*	No. 4	Glass Bowl; Toledo, OH	ESPN3	L 20–54	20,184
September 13	3:30 pm	Lehigh*	No. 7	Cowell Stadium; Durham, NH	ASN	W 45–27	9,358
September 20	4:00 pm	at No. 17 Richmond	No. 7	Robins Stadium; Richmond, VA	CSN	W 29–26	8,404
September 27	6:00 pm	Dartmouth*	No. 4	Cowell Stadium; Durham, NH (rivalry)	UNHTV	W 52–19	8,753
October 4	1:30 pm	at Elon	No. 4	Rhodes Stadium; Elon, NC		W 48–14	6,141
October 11	3:30 pm	No. 10 William & Mary^{†}	No. 4	Cowell Stadium; Durham, NH	NBCSN	W 32–3	18,774
October 25	3:00 pm	Stony Brook	No. 3	Cowell Stadium; Durham, NH	UNHTV	W 28–20	8,811
November 1	6:00 pm	No. 23 Albany	No. 2	Cowell Stadium; Durham, NH	UNHTV	W 49–24	3,536
November 8	12:30 pm	at Rhode Island	No. 2	Meade Stadium; Kingston, RI		W 41–14	7,210
November 15	1:00 pm	Delaware	No. 1	Cowell Stadium; Durham, NH		W 43–14	8,199
November 22	3:30 pm	at Maine	No. 1	Alfond Stadium; Orono, ME (Battle for the Brice–Cowell Musket)	NBCSN	W 20–12	4,023
December 6	1:00 pm	No. 9 Fordham*	No. 1	Cowell Stadium; Durham, NH (NCAA Division I Second Round)	ESPN3	W 44–19	4,021
December 12	8:00 pm	No. 8 Chattanooga*	No. 1	Cowell Stadium; Durham, NH (NCAA Division I Quarterfinal)	ESPN2	W 35–30	6,380
December 20	2:00 pm	No. 7 Illinois State*	No. 1	Cowell Stadium; Durham, NH (NCAA Division I Semifinal)	ESPNU	L 18–21	9,497
*Non-conference game; ^{†}Homecoming; Rankings from The Sports Network Poll released prior to the game; All times are in Eastern time

== Ranking movements ==
Ranking movements Legend: ██ Increase in ranking ██ Decrease in ranking ( ) = First-place votes
	Week														
Poll	Pre	1	2	3	4	5	6	7	8	9	10	11	12	13	Final
Sports Network	4	6	7	7	4	4	4	3	3	2	2	1 (70)	1 (74)	1 (93)	3
Coaches	4	8	9	9	7	6	6	5	5	4	3	2 (4)	2 (4)	1 (20)	3
