= 2014 Maine Black Bears football team =

American college football season

2014 Maine Black Bears football
- Conference: Colonial Athletic Association
- Record: 5–6 (4–4 CAA)
- Head coach: Jack Cosgrove (22nd season)
- Offensive coordinator: Kevin Bourgoin
- Defensive coordinator: Joe Harasymiak
- Home stadium: Alfond Stadium

2014 Colonial Athletic Association football standings
	Conf.			Overall
Team	W		L	W		L
No. 3 New Hampshire $^	8	–	0	12	–	2
No. 7 Villanova ^	7	–	1	11	–	3
No. 18 James Madison ^	6	–	2	9	–	4
No. 16 Richmond ^	5	–	3	9	–	5
William & Mary	4	–	4	7	–	5
Delaware	4	–	4	6	–	6
Maine	4	–	4	5	–	6
Stony Brook	4	–	4	5	–	7
Albany	3	–	5	7	–	5
Towson	2	–	6	4	–	8
Rhode Island	1	–	7	1	–	11
Elon	0	–	8	1	–	11
$ – Conference champion; ^ – FCS playoff participant; Rankings from The Sports Network poll

The 2014 Maine Black Bears football team represented the University of Maine in the 2014 NCAA Division I FCS football season. They were led by 22nd-year head coach Jack Cosgrove and played their home games at Alfond Stadium. They were a member of the Colonial Athletic Association. They finished the season 5–6, 4–4 in CAA play to finish in a four-way tie for fifth place.

== Schedule ==
Date	Time	Opponent	Rank	Site	TV	Result	Attendance
August 30	6:00 pm	Norfolk State*	No. 25	Alfond Stadium; Orono, ME		W 10–6	6,951
September 13	1:00 pm	at Bryant*	No. 23	Bulldog Stadium; Smithfield, RI		L 10–13	3,291
September 20	1:00 pm	at Boston College*		Alumni Stadium; Chestnut Hill, MA	ESPN3	L 10–40	28,676
September 27	7:00 pm	at Towson		Johnny Unitas Stadium; Towson, MD	CSN	W 27–24	6,031
October 4	12:30 pm	No. 6 Villanova		Alfond Stadium; Orono, ME	BBTV	L 20–41	5,173
October 11	7:00 pm	at Stony Brook		Kenneth P. LaValle Stadium; Stony Brook, NY	ASN	L 7–19	5,842
October 18	12:30 pm	Albany^{†}		Alfond Stadium; Orono, NE	BBTV	L 7–20	7,464
October 25	12:00 pm	at Rhode Island		Meade Stadium; Kingston, RI	ASN	W 20–14	6,316
November 8	12:30 pm	No. 8 Richmond		Alfond Stadium; Orono, NE	BBTV	W 33–20	4,675
November 15	3:00 pm	at Elon		Rhodes Stadium; Elon, NC		W 24–17	5,022
November 22	3:30 pm	No. 1 New Hampshire		Alfond Stadium; Orono, NE (Battle for the Brice–Cowell Musket)	NBCSN	L 12–20	4,023
*Non-conference game; ^{†}Homecoming; Rankings from The Sports Network Poll released prior to the game; All times are in Eastern time

- -BBTV affiliates include: WVII, WFVX, WPME, and Fox College Sports.

== Ranking movements ==
Ranking movements Legend: ██ Increase in ranking ██ Decrease in ranking — = Not ranked RV = Received votes
	Week														
Poll	Pre	1	2	3	4	5	6	7	8	9	10	11	12	13	Final
Sports Network	25	24	23	RV	RV	RV	RV	—	—	—	—	—	—	—	—
Coaches	20	22	20	RV	—	—	—	—	—	—	—	—	—	—	—
