= 2014 Rhode Island Rams football team =

American college football season

2014 Rhode Island Rams football
- Conference: Colonial Athletic Association
- Record: 1–11 (1–7 CAA)
- Head coach: Jim Fleming (1st season)
- Offensive coordinator: Bill Bleil (1st season)
- Defensive coordinator: Pete Rekstis (1st season)
- Home stadium: Meade Stadium

2014 Colonial Athletic Association football standings
	Conf.			Overall
Team	W		L	W		L
No. 3 New Hampshire $^	8	–	0	12	–	2
No. 7 Villanova ^	7	–	1	11	–	3
No. 18 James Madison ^	6	–	2	9	–	4
No. 16 Richmond ^	5	–	3	9	–	5
William & Mary	4	–	4	7	–	5
Delaware	4	–	4	6	–	6
Maine	4	–	4	5	–	6
Stony Brook	4	–	4	5	–	7
Albany	3	–	5	7	–	5
Towson	2	–	6	4	–	8
Rhode Island	1	–	7	1	–	11
Elon	0	–	8	1	–	11
$ – Conference champion; ^ – FCS playoff participant; Rankings from The Sports Network poll

The 2014 Rhode Island Rams football team represented the University of Rhode Island in the 2014 NCAA Division I FCS football season. They were led by first year head coach Jim Fleming and played their home games at Meade Stadium. They were a member of the Colonial Athletic Association. They finished the season 1–11, 1–7 in CAA play to finish in 11th place.

On December 20, 2013, Fleming was announced as the new Rhode Island head coach.

== Schedule ==
Date	Time	Opponent	Site	TV	Result	Attendance
September 6	7:00 pm	at Marshall*	Joan C. Edwards Stadium; Huntington, WV	ASN	L 7–48	25,106
September 13	1:00 pm	at No. 19 Fordham*	Jack Coffey Field; Bronx, NY		L 7–54	6,979
September 20	1:00 pm	Albany	Meade Stadium; Kingston, RI		L 20–37	6,351
September 27	4:00 pm	at Central Connecticut*	Arute Field; New Britain, CT		L 14–38	4,022
October 4	1:00 pm	Brown*	Meade Stadium; Kingston, RI (Battle for the Governor's Cup)		L 13–20	4,205
October 11	1:00 pm	at No. 6 Villanova	Villanova Stadium; Villanova, PA		L 21–44	3,611
October 18	3:30 pm	at No. 19 Richmond	Robins Stadium; Richmond, VA	ASN	L 0–37	7,837
October 25	12:00 pm	Maine^{†}	Meade Stadium; Kingston, RI	ASN	L 14–20	6,316
November 1	12:00 pm	at Delaware	Delaware Stadium; Dover, DE		L 13–28	12,798
November 8	12:30 pm	No. 2 New Hampshire	Meade Stadium; Kingston, RI		L 14–41	7,210
November 15	1:00 pm	at Stony Brook	Kenneth P. LaValle Stadium; Stony Brook, NY		L 14–35	5,010
November 22	12:30 pm	Towson	Meade Stadium; Kingston, RI		W 13–7	2,501
*Non-conference game; ^{†}Homecoming; Rankings from The Sports Network Poll released prior to the game; All times are in Eastern time
