= 2014 Elon Phoenix football team =

American college football season

2014 Elon Phoenix football
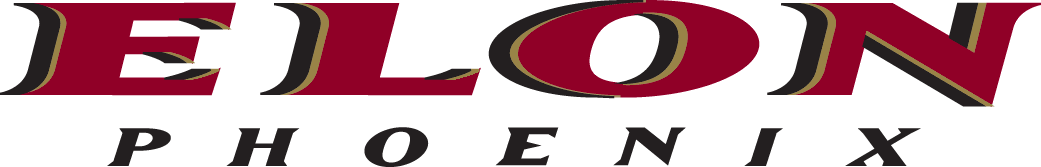
- Conference: Colonial Athletic Association
- Record: 1–11 (0–8 CAA)
- Head coach: Rich Skrosky (1st season)
- Offensive coordinator: Damian Wroblewski (1st season)
- Defensive coordinator: Jerry Petercuskie (1st season)
- Home stadium: Rhodes Stadium

2014 Colonial Athletic Association football standings
	Conf.			Overall
Team	W		L	W		L
No. 3 New Hampshire $^	8	–	0	12	–	2
No. 7 Villanova ^	7	–	1	11	–	3
No. 18 James Madison ^	6	–	2	9	–	4
No. 16 Richmond ^	5	–	3	9	–	5
William & Mary	4	–	4	7	–	5
Delaware	4	–	4	6	–	6
Maine	4	–	4	5	–	6
Stony Brook	4	–	4	5	–	7
Albany	3	–	5	7	–	5
Towson	2	–	6	4	–	8
Rhode Island	1	–	7	1	–	11
Elon	0	–	8	1	–	11
$ – Conference champion; ^ – FCS playoff participant; Rankings from The Sports Network poll

The 2014 Elon Phoenix football team represented Elon University in the 2014 NCAA Division I FCS football season. They were led by-first year head coach Rich Skrosky and played their home games at Rhodes Stadium. They were first-year members of the Colonial Athletic Association. They finished the season 1–11, 0–8 in CAA play to finish in last place.

== Schedule ==
Date	Time	Opponent	Site	TV	Result	Attendance
August 30	6:00 pm	at Duke*	Wallace Wade Stadium; Durham, NC	ESPN3	L 13–52	31,213
September 13	6:00 pm	North Carolina A&T*	Rhodes Stadium; Elon, NC	PAA	L 12–17	7,228
September 20	7:00 pm	Charlotte*	Rhodes Stadium; Elon, NC	ASN	W 20–13	11,203
September 27	7:00 pm	at No. 3 Coastal Carolina*	Brooks Stadium; Conway, SC	ASN	L 3–31	9,538
October 4	1:30 pm	No. 4 New Hampshire	Rhodes Stadium; Elon, NC	PAA	L 14–48	6,141
October 11	3:30 pm	at Delaware	Delaware Stadium; Newark, DE		L 24–34	19,476
October 18	1:30 pm	Stony Brook^{†}	Rhodes Stadium; Elon, NC	PAA	L 3–20	6,120
October 25	3:00 pm	No. 16 Richmond	Rhodes Stadium; Elon, NC	PAA	L 10–30	5,042
November 1	4:00 pm	at Towson	Johnny Unitas Stadium; Towson, MD	PAA	L 19–21	7,665
November 8	3:30 pm	at No. 24 William & Mary	Zable Stadium; Williamsburg, VA	CSN	L 7–17	9,512
November 15	3:00 pm	Maine	Rhodes Stadium; Elon, NC	PAA	L 17–24	5,022
November 22	12:00 pm	at No. 17 James Madison	Bridgeforth Stadium; Harrisonburg, VA	ASN	L 27–59	15,793
*Non-conference game; ^{†}Homecoming; Rankings from The Sports Network Poll released prior to the game; All times are in Eastern time

== Game summaries ==
=== At Duke ===
	1	2	3	4	Total
Phoenix	3	3	0	7	13
Blue Devils	7	21	10	14	52

=== North Carolina A&T ===
	1	2	3	4	Total
Aggies	10	0	0	7	17
Phoenix	3	6	3	0	12

=== Charlotte ===
	1	2	3	4	Total
49ers	7	0	3	3	13
Phoenix	0	7	6	7	20

=== At Coastal Carolina ===
	1	2	3	4	Total
Phoenix	0	0	3	0	3
#3 Chanticleers	7	3	7	14	31

=== New Hampshire ===
	1	2	3	4	Total
#4 Wildcats	17	17	14	0	48
Phoenix	0	0	0	14	14

=== At Delaware ===
	1	2	3	4	Total
Phoenix	0	3	14	7	24
Blue Hens	6	21	0	7	34

=== Stony Brook ===
	1	2	3	4	Total
Seawolves	7	7	0	6	20
Phoenix	3	0	0	0	3

=== Richmond ===
	1	2	3	4	Total
#16 Spiders	10	10	3	7	30
Phoenix	0	3	0	7	10

=== At Towson ===
	1	2	3	4	Total
Phoenix	0	6	7	6	19
Tigers	14	7	0	0	21

=== At William & Mary ===
	1	2	3	4	Total
Phoenix	0	0	7	0	7
#24 Tribe	7	10	0	0	17

=== Maine ===
	1	2	3	4	Total
Black Bears	7	7	3	7	24
Phoenix	7	3	0	7	17

=== At James Madison ===
	1	2	3	4	Total
Phoenix	0	7	7	13	27
#17 Dukes	17	28	14	0	59
