= 2014 Richmond Spiders football team =

American college football season

2014 Richmond Spiders football

FCS Playoffs Second Round, L 15–36 vs. Coastal Carolina
- Conference: Colonial Athletic Association

Ranking
- Sports Network: No. 16
- FCS Coaches: No. 16
- Record: 9–5 (5–3 CAA)
- Head coach: Danny Rocco (3rd season)
- Offensive coordinator: Brandon Streeter (3rd season)
- Defensive coordinator: Bob Trott (5th season)
- Home stadium: E. Claiborne Robins Stadium

2014 Colonial Athletic Association football standings
	Conf.			Overall
Team	W		L	W		L
No. 3 New Hampshire $^	8	–	0	12	–	2
No. 7 Villanova ^	7	–	1	11	–	3
No. 18 James Madison ^	6	–	2	9	–	4
No. 16 Richmond ^	5	–	3	9	–	5
William & Mary	4	–	4	7	–	5
Delaware	4	–	4	6	–	6
Maine	4	–	4	5	–	6
Stony Brook	4	–	4	5	–	7
Albany	3	–	5	7	–	5
Towson	2	–	6	4	–	8
Rhode Island	1	–	7	1	–	11
Elon	0	–	8	1	–	11
$ – Conference champion; ^ – FCS playoff participant; Rankings from The Sports Network poll

The 2014 Richmond Spiders football team represented the University of Richmond in the 2014 NCAA Division I FCS football season. They were led by third-year head coach Danny Rocco and played their home games at E. Claiborne Robins Stadium. The Spiders were a member of the Colonial Athletic Association. They finished the season 9–5, 5–3 in CAA play to finish in fourth place. They received an at-large bid to the FCS Playoffs where they defeated Morgan State in the first round before losing in the second round to Coastal Carolina.

== Schedule ==
Date	Time	Opponent	Rank	Site	TV	Result	Attendance
August 30	6:00 pm	Morehead State*	No. 20	Robins Stadium; Richmond, VA	STV	W 55–10	7,725
September 6	3:30 pm	at Virginia*	No. 17	Scott Stadium; Charlottesville, VA	ESPN3	L 13–45	34,533
September 13	6:00 pm	Hampton*	No. 18	Robins Stadium; Richmond, VA	STV	W 42–17	7,802
September 20	4:00 pm	No. 7 New Hampshire	No. 17	Robins Stadium; Richmond, VA	CSN	L 26–29	8,404
October 4	7:00 pm	at Liberty*	No. 20	Williams Stadium; Lynchburg, VA	ESPN3	W 46–39 ^{2OT}	20,838
October 11	3:30 pm	at Albany	No. 22	Bob Ford Field; Albany, NY		W 41–28	8,500
October 18	3:30 pm	Rhode Island^{†}	No. 19	Robins Stadium; Richmond, VA	ASN	W 37–0	7,837
October 25	3:00 pm	at Elon	No. 16	Rhodes Stadium; Elon, NC		W 30–10	5,042
November 1	12:00 pm	No. 4 Villanova	No. 13	Robins Stadium; Richmond, VA	CSN	W 10–9	7,902
November 8	12:30 pm	at Maine	No. 8	Alfond Stadium; Orono, ME		L 20–33	4,675
November 15	12:30 pm	No. 25 James Madison	No. 14	Robins Stadium; Richmond, VA (rivalry)	NBCSN	L 20–55	8,700
November 22	7:30 pm	at No. 22 William & Mary	No. 21	Zable Stadium; Williamsburg, VA (Capital Cup)	NBCSN	W 34–20	8,665
November 29	1:00 pm	Morgan State*	No. 18	Robins Stadium; Richmond, VA (FCS Playoffs First Round)	ESPN3	W 46–24	4,126
December 6	1:00 pm	at No. 6 Coastal Carolina*	No. 18	Brooks Stadium; Conway, SC (FCS Playoffs Second Round)	ESPN3	L 15–36	5,601
*Non-conference game; ^{†}Homecoming; Rankings from The Sports Network Poll released prior to the game; All times are in Eastern time

== Roster ==
2014 Richmond Spiders football team roster
Players
Coaches
Offense

Pos.	#	Name	Class
RB	1	Jacobi Green	Jr
QB	2	Michael Rocco	Sr
QB	3	Michael Strauss	Sr
RB	4	Seth Fisher	Jr
QB	5	Kyle Lauletta	So
WR	11	Reggie Diggs	Jr
WR	12	Brian Brown	So
WR	26	Jarmal Bevels	Fr
WR	29	Stephen Barnette	Sr
OL	54	Jacob Ruby	Sr

Defense

Pos.	#	Name	Class
DL	97	Andrew Clyde	Fr
DL	98	Winston Craig	So

Special teams

Pos.	#	Name	Class

Head coach

- Danny Rocco

Coordinators/assistant coaches

Legend

- (C) Team captain
- (S) Suspended
- (I) Ineligible
- Injured
- Redshirt

Roster

== Ranking movements ==
Ranking movements Legend: ██ Increase in ranking ██ Decrease in ranking
	Week														
Poll	Pre	1	2	3	4	5	6	7	8	9	10	11	12	13	Final
Sports Network	20	17	18	17	20	20	22	19	16	13	8	14	21	18	16
Coaches	24	20	21	18	21	21	21	20	17	14	8	14	21	16	16
