= Laith Wallschleger =

American actor (born 1992)

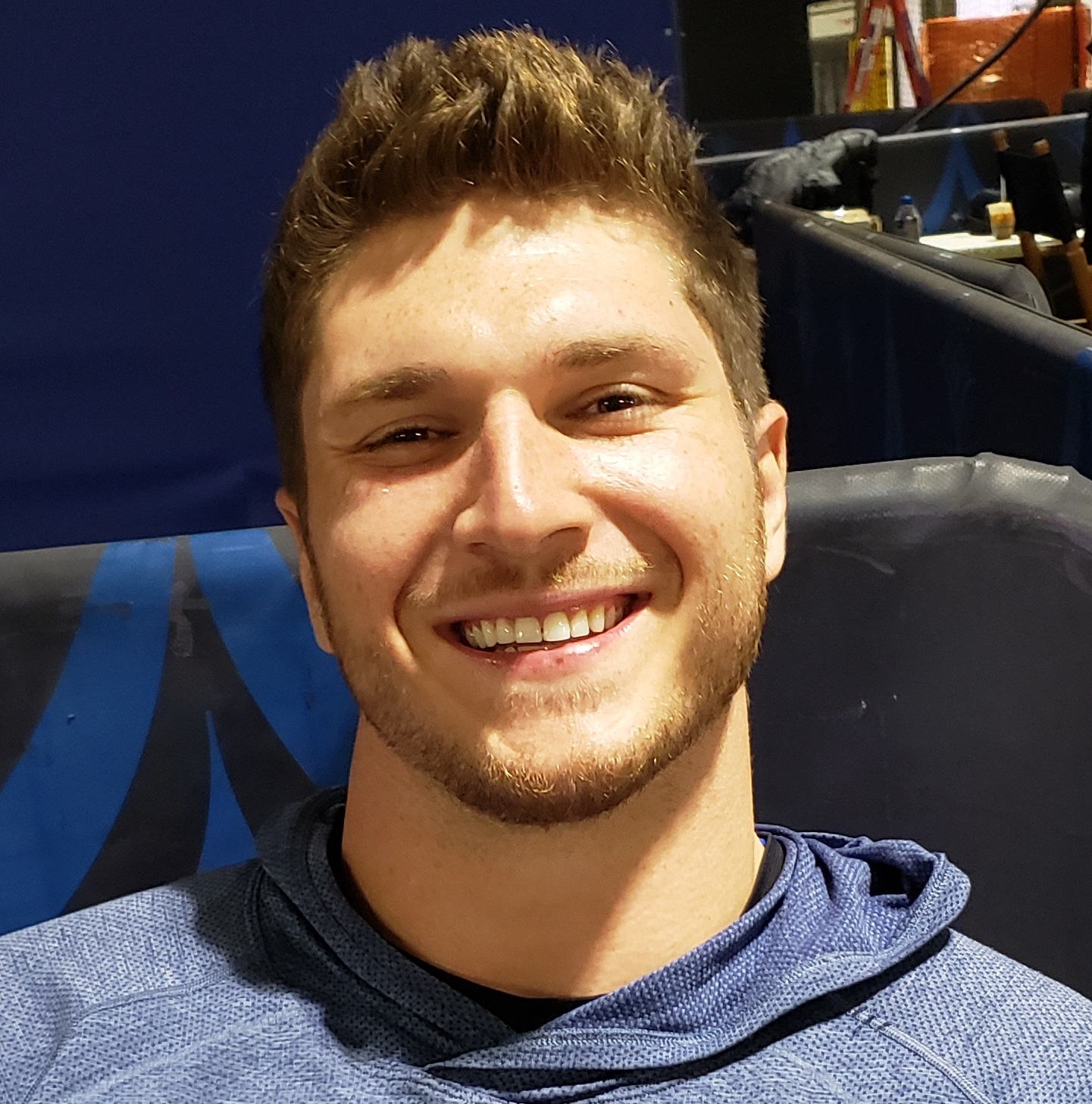
- Wallschleger in 2022
- Born: March 15, 1992 (age 34); Alexandria, Virginia, U.S.
- Education: University of Delaware (B.S.), (M.B.A.) American Academy of Dramatic Arts
- Occupation: Actor
- Years active: 2010–present
- Website: laithwallschleger.com

Laith Wallschleger (born March 15, 1992) is an American actor. He played college football for the University of Delaware, setting school records. He later played a season with the Jacksonville Sharks of the Arena Football League, before transitioning from athletics to the entertainment industry.

He has made guest starring appearances on ABC's The Rookie; MacGruber on Peacock; NCIS on CBS; All American on The CW; The Me and You Show on Snapchat; stunts on the film Paterno for HBO; and the 17th season of Worst Cooks in America on the Food Network, among many others.

== Early life and education ==
Laith Wallschleger was born on March 15, 1992, in Alexandria, Virginia to Kurt and Mayla Wallschleger. He graduated from St. Stephen's & St. Agnes School, a private, coed, independent Episcopal college prep school in Alexandria, in 2010.

Wallschleger was a first team All-State selection at both defensive end and tight end on the school's team. He was also first team all-conference as a defensive end and was named his team's Most Valuable Player. As a senior, he had 21 sacks, to break the school's single-season record. He also had 112 tackles, with 46 for a loss; four forced fumbles and five recoveries in nine games as a defensive end. On offense as a tight end, he caught 15 passes for 423 yards. And on special teams, he blocked a punt, a field goal and was special teams leader in tackles. The team advanced to the state playoffs in 2007. Wallschleger was also a member of the school's basketball, baseball and track teams.

== College football career ==
He played football for the University of Delaware Fightin' Blue Hens beginning with the 2010 season, when he established himself as one of the best scout players on the team that advanced to the FCS national championship title game. Among his honors, he was named the Blue Hen Touchdown Club Defensive Player of the Week against Towson and the Blue Hen Touchdown Club Most Improved Defensive Player for spring drills. During his sophomore season, he blocked three kicks, one shy of the team's single season record. His junior year, he blocked six field goal attempts, setting a team career record. He was also named to the Delaware All-State College Football Team. But he suffered a season-ending injury, when he tore the ACL and meniscus in his right knee during a September 28, 2013, win over James Madison. Despite the injury and the year away from the football field spent in recovery and rehab, he was named to the Colonial Athletic Association Academic Honor Roll four consecutive years. He graduated with a Bachelor of Science degree with honors in finance and a minor in theatre, in May 2014. While completing his college football career, he also obtained an MBA degree at Delaware.

== Professional football career ==
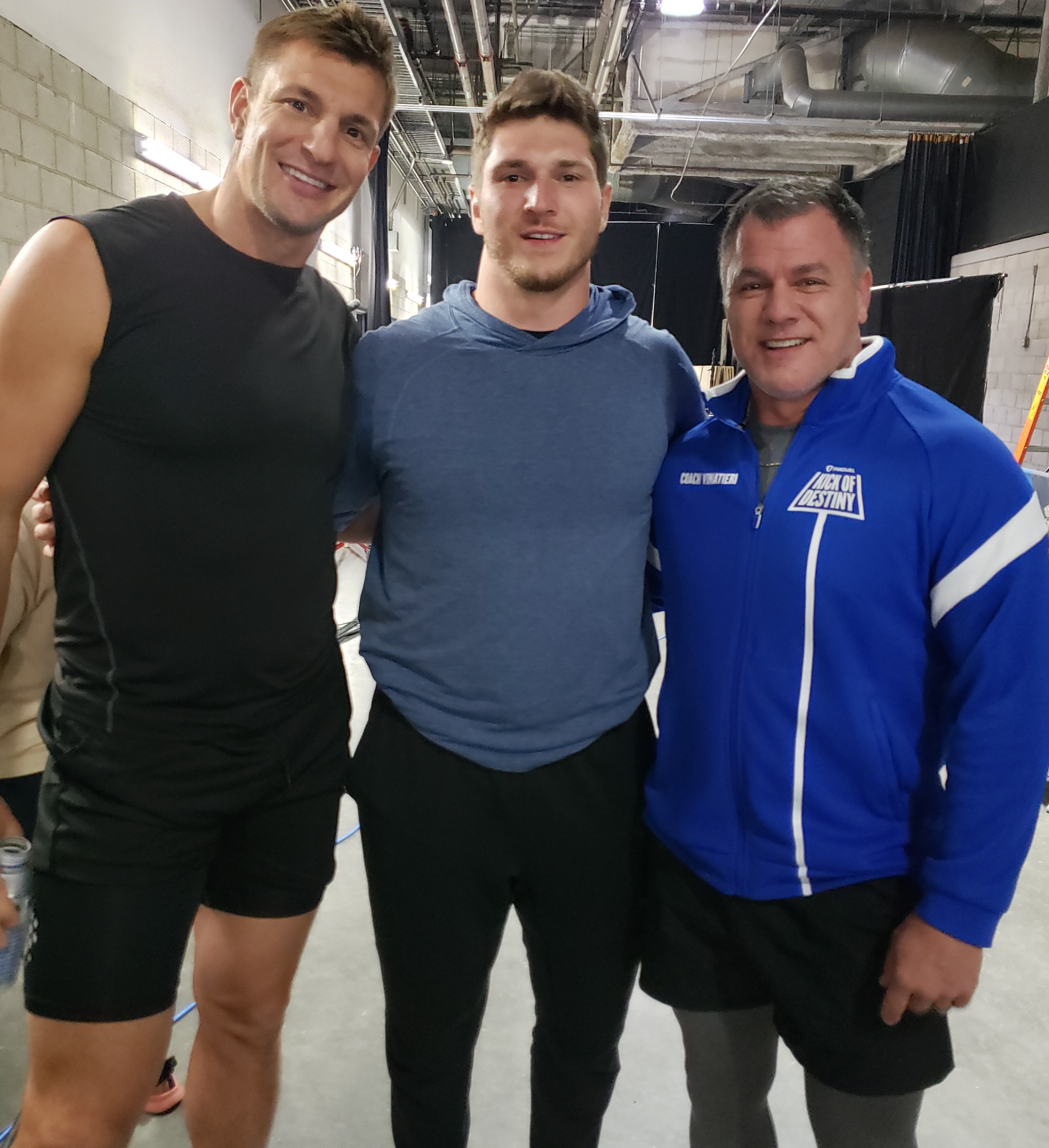
Wallschleger flanked by 4-time NFL Super Bowl champions, Rob Gronkowski and Adam Vinatieri

After graduation, Wallschleger attended rookie mini-camp on a tryout basis with Arizona Cardinals of the National Football League in May 2015.

During the 2016 season, Wallschleger played for the Jacksonville Sharks of the Arena Football League. During that season, he recorded seven tackles, four solo tackles, five assists and broke up one pass.

== Acting, voice acting and stunt career ==
Following his transition from athletics to acting, Wallschleger expanded on his theater minor at the University of Delaware, by studying and graduating from the American Academy of Dramatic Arts in Los Angeles.

His major credits include guest starring roles on ABC's The Rookie; MacGruber on Peacock; NCIS on CBS; All American on The CW; The Me and You Show on Snapchat; stunts on the film Paterno on HBO; the 17th season of Worst Cooks in America on the Food Network; and dozens more.

In 2024, Wallschleger portrayed New England Patriots tight end Rob Gronkowski in the FX series American Sports Story: Aaron Hernandez. A longtime friend of Gronkowski, he has been Gronkowski's body double in commercials. He was one of the leads in the Lifetime holiday film Christmas in the Spotlight, based on Taylor Swift's relationship with Travis Kelce, which premiered on November 23, 2024.

Wallschleger also has a significant body of work as a voiceover artist, capable of performing "over 100 accents, characters, and celebrity impressions." Among his other voicework, he also narrated the audio book Summary: How to Be a Capitalist Without Any Capital. He also portrayed Sylux, the main antagonist of the 2025 video game Metroid Prime 4: Beyond, via motion capture and voice work.

Wallschleger was also the recipient of the Gold Award, Best Actor Runner Up at the 2019 Southeast Regional Film Festival.

== Personal life ==
Wallschleger's first name "Laith" means lion in Arabic. However, he was also given "Andrew" as a middle name, in case he disliked Laith. But in an interview, he said, "I like my name. It’s different. I’ve never met another Laith."
