= 2014 Albany Great Danes football team =

American college football season

2014 Albany Great Danes football
- Conference: Colonial Athletic Association
- Record: 7–5 (3–5 CAA)
- Head coach: Greg Gattuso (1st season)
- Offensive coordinator: Joe Bernard (1st season)
- Defensive coordinator: Bob Benson (1st season)
- Home stadium: Bob Ford Field

2014 Colonial Athletic Association football standings
	Conf.			Overall
Team	W		L	W		L
No. 3 New Hampshire $^	8	–	0	12	–	2
No. 7 Villanova ^	7	–	1	11	–	3
No. 18 James Madison ^	6	–	2	9	–	4
No. 16 Richmond ^	5	–	3	9	–	5
William & Mary	4	–	4	7	–	5
Delaware	4	–	4	6	–	6
Maine	4	–	4	5	–	6
Stony Brook	4	–	4	5	–	7
Albany	3	–	5	7	–	5
Towson	2	–	6	4	–	8
Rhode Island	1	–	7	1	–	11
Elon	0	–	8	1	–	11
$ – Conference champion; ^ – FCS playoff participant; Rankings from The Sports Network poll

The 2014 Albany Great Danes football team represented the University at Albany, SUNY as a member of the Colonial Athletic Association (CAA) during the 2014 NCAA Division I FCS football season. Led by first-year head coach Greg Gattuso, the Great Danes compiled an overall record of 7–5 with a mark of 3–5 in conference play, placing ninth in the CAA. The team played home games at Bob Ford Field in Albany, New York.

== Schedule ==
Date	Time	Opponent	Rank	Site	TV	Result	Attendance
August 30	6:00 pm	Holy Cross*		Bob Ford Field; Albany, NY	ESPN3	W 14–13	6,748
September 6	6:00 pm	at Central Connecticut*		Arute Field; New Britain, CT		W 19–0	4,150
September 20	1:00 pm	at Rhode Island		Meade Stadium; Kingston, RI		W 37–20	6,351
September 27	6:00 pm	Columbia*	No. 24	Bob Ford Field; Albany, NY		W 42–7	5,107
October 4	6:00 pm	James Madison	No. 23	Bob Ford Field; Albany, NY		L 28–31	3,284
October 11	3:30 pm	No. 22 Richmond^{†}		Bob Ford Field; Albany, NY		L 28–41	8,500
October 18	12:30 pm	at Maine		Alfond Stadium; Orono, ME		W 20–7	7,464
October 25	3:30 pm	Colgate*	No. 25	Bob Ford Field; Albany, NY	TWCSC NY	W 24–17	4,952
November 1	6:00 pm	at No. 2 New Hampshire	No. 23	Cowell Stadium; Durham, NH		L 24–49	3,536
November 8	3:30 pm	Delaware		Bob Ford Field; Albany, NY		L 28–31	4,674
November 15	7:00 pm	at No. 6 Villanova		Villanova Stadium; Villanova, PA	ASN	L 31–48	4,541
November 22	3:30 pm	Stony Brook		Bob Ford Field; Albany, NY (rivalry)		W 27–17	4,123
*Non-conference game; ^{†}Homecoming; Rankings from The Sports Network Poll released prior to the game; All times are in Eastern time

== Ranking movements ==
Ranking movements Legend: ██ Increase in ranking ██ Decrease in ranking — = Not ranked RV = Received votes
	Week														
Poll	Pre	1	2	3	4	5	6	7	8	9	10	11	12	13	Final
Sports Network	—	—	RV	RV	24	23	RV	RV	25	23	RV	RV	RV	RV	RV
Coaches	—	—	RV	RV	RV	RV	RV	—	RV	RV	RV	—	—	—	—
