= 2014 James Madison Dukes football team =

American college football season

2014 James Madison Dukes football

FCS Playoffs First Round vs. Liberty, L 21–26
- Conference: Colonial Athletic Association

Ranking
- Sports Network: No. 18
- FCS Coaches: No. 19
- Record: 9–4 (6–2 CAA)
- Head coach: Everett Withers (1st season)
- Co-offensive coordinators: Brad Davis (1st season); Drew Mehringer (1st season)
- Defensive coordinator: Brandon Staley (1st season)
- Home stadium: Bridgeforth Stadium

2014 Colonial Athletic Association football standings
	Conf.			Overall
Team	W		L	W		L
No. 3 New Hampshire $^	8	–	0	12	–	2
No. 7 Villanova ^	7	–	1	11	–	3
No. 18 James Madison ^	6	–	2	9	–	4
No. 16 Richmond ^	5	–	3	9	–	5
William & Mary	4	–	4	7	–	5
Delaware	4	–	4	6	–	6
Maine	4	–	4	5	–	6
Stony Brook	4	–	4	5	–	7
Albany	3	–	5	7	–	5
Towson	2	–	6	4	–	8
Rhode Island	1	–	7	1	–	11
Elon	0	–	8	1	–	11
$ – Conference champion; ^ – FCS playoff participant; Rankings from The Sports Network poll

The 2014 James Madison Dukes football team represented James Madison University in the 2014 NCAA Division I FCS football season. They were led by first year head coach Everett Withers and played their home games at Bridgeforth Stadium and Zane Showker Field. They were a member of the Colonial Athletic Association. They finished the season 9–4, 6–2 in CAA play to finish in third place. They received an at-large bid to the FCS Playoffs where they lost in the first round to Liberty.

== Schedule ==
Date	Time	Opponent	Rank	Site	TV	Result	Attendance
August 30	3:30 pm	at Maryland*		Byrd Stadium; College Park, MD	BTN	L 7–52	45,080
September 6	12:30 pm	at Lehigh*		Goodman Stadium; Bethlehem, PA	SE2	W 31–28	6,519
September 13	4:00 pm	Saint Francis (PA)*		Bridgeforth Stadium; Harrisonburg, VA		W 38–22	23,577
September 20	12:30 pm	at No. 8 Villanova		Villanova Stadium; Villanova, PA	CSN	L 31–49	10,781
September 27	4:00 pm	No. 25 Delaware		Bridgeforth Stadium; Harrisonburg, VA (rivalry)	CSN	L 23–30 ^{OT}	20,592
October 4	6:00 pm	at No. 23 Albany		Bob Ford Field; Albany, NY		W 31–28	3,284
October 11	12:30 pm	Towson		Bridgeforth Stadium; Harrisonburg, VA	CSN	W 62–7	24,113
October 25	12:00 pm	at Charlotte*		Jerry Richardson Stadium; Charlotte, NC		W 48–40	15,677
November 1	3:30 pm	No. 17 William & Mary^{†}		Bridgeforth Stadium; Harrisonburg, VA (rivalry)	ASN	W 31–24	21,778
November 8	1:00 pm	at Stony Brook		Kenneth P. LaValle Stadium; Stony Brook, NY		W 27–24	5,115
November 15	12:30 pm	at No. 14 Richmond	No. 25	Robins Stadium; Richmond, VA (rivalry)	NBCSN	W 55–20	8,700
November 22	12:00 pm	Elon	No. 17	Bridgeforth Stadium; Harrisonburg, VA	ASN	W 59–27	15,793
November 29	4:00 pm	No. 20 Liberty*	No. 15	Bridgeforth Stadium; Harrisonburg, VA (FCS Playoffs First Round)	ESPN3	L 21–26	13,040
*Non-conference game; ^{†}Homecoming; Rankings from The Sports Network FCS Poll released prior to game Poll released prior to the game; All times are in Eastern time

- Source: Schedule

== Ranking movements ==
Ranking movements Legend: ██ Increase in ranking ██ Decrease in ranking — = Not ranked RV = Received votes
	Week														
Poll	Pre	1	2	3	4	5	6	7	8	9	10	11	12	13	Final
Sports Network	RV	RV	RV	RV	RV	RV	RV	RV	RV	RV	RV	25	17	15	18
Coaches	RV	RV	RV	RV	—	—	—	RV	—	—	RV	RV	22	15	19
