= 2014 Stony Brook Seawolves football team =

American college football season

2014 Stony Brook Seawolves football
- Conference: Colonial Athletic Association
- Record: 5–7 (4–4 CAA)
- Head coach: Chuck Priore (9th season)
- Offensive coordinator: Jeff Behrman (9th season)
- Defensive coordinator: Rob Nevaiser
- Home stadium: Kenneth P. LaValle Stadium

2014 Colonial Athletic Association football standings
	Conf.			Overall
Team	W		L	W		L
No. 3 New Hampshire $^	8	–	0	12	–	2
No. 7 Villanova ^	7	–	1	11	–	3
No. 18 James Madison ^	6	–	2	9	–	4
No. 16 Richmond ^	5	–	3	9	–	5
William & Mary	4	–	4	7	–	5
Delaware	4	–	4	6	–	6
Maine	4	–	4	5	–	6
Stony Brook	4	–	4	5	–	7
Albany	3	–	5	7	–	5
Towson	2	–	6	4	–	8
Rhode Island	1	–	7	1	–	11
Elon	0	–	8	1	–	11
$ – Conference champion; ^ – FCS playoff participant; Rankings from The Sports Network poll

The 2014 Stony Brook Seawolves football team represented Stony Brook University in the 2014 NCAA Division I FCS football season. The Seawolves competed as second year members of the Colonial Athletic Association with Chuck Priore as the head coach for his ninth season. They played their home games at Kenneth P. LaValle Stadium in Stony Brook, New York. They finished the season 5–7, 4–4 in CAA play to finish in a four-way tie for fifth place.

== Schedule ==
Date	Time	Opponent	Site	TV	Result	Attendance
August 28	7:00 pm	Bryant*	Kenneth P. LaValle Stadium; Stony Brook, NY		L 7–13	10,252
September 6	12:00 pm	at UConn*	Rentschler Field; East Hartford, CT	SNY	L 16–19	23,543
September 13	6:00 pm	American International*	Kenneth P. LaValle Stadium; Stony Brook, NY		W 20–3	5,109
September 20	7:00 pm	at North Dakota*	Alerus Center; Grand Forks, ND		L 3–13	7,030
September 27	6:00 pm	No. 12 William & Mary^{†}	Kenneth P. LaValle Stadium; Stony Brook, NY		L 21–27 ^{OT}	11,301
October 4	3:30 pm	at Towson	Johnny Unitas Stadium; Towson, MD	CSN/SNY	W 14–3	6,517
October 11	7:00 pm	Maine	Kenneth P. LaValle Stadium; Stony Brook, NY	ASN/SNY	W 19–7	5,842
October 18	1:30 pm	at Elon	Rhodes Stadium; Elon, NC		W 20–3	6,120
October 25	3:00 pm	at No. 3 New Hampshire	Cowell Stadium; Durham, NH		L 20–28	8,811
November 8	1:00 pm	James Madison	Kenneth P. LaValle Stadium; Stony Brook, NY		L 24–27	5,115
November 15	1:00 pm	Rhode Island	Kenneth P. LaValle Stadium; Stony Brook, NY		W 35–14	5,010
November 22	3:30 pm	at Albany	Bob Ford Field; Albany, NY (Rivalry)		L 17–27	4,123
*Non-conference game; ^{†}Homecoming; Rankings from The Sports Network Poll released prior to the game; All times are in Eastern time

*Source: Schedule
