= 2014 William & Mary Tribe football team =

American college football season

2014 William & Mary Tribe football
- Conference: Colonial Athletic Association
- Record: 7–5 (4–4 CAA)
- Head coach: Jimmye Laycock (35th season)
- Offensive coordinator: Kevin Rogers (2nd season)
- Defensive coordinator: Trevor Andrews (1st season)
- Captains: Bo Revell; Luke Rhodes; Stephen Sinnott; Ivan Tagoe
- Home stadium: Zable Stadium

2014 Colonial Athletic Association football standings
	Conf.			Overall
Team	W		L	W		L
No. 3 New Hampshire $^	8	–	0	12	–	2
No. 7 Villanova ^	7	–	1	11	–	3
No. 18 James Madison ^	6	–	2	9	–	4
No. 16 Richmond ^	5	–	3	9	–	5
William & Mary	4	–	4	7	–	5
Delaware	4	–	4	6	–	6
Maine	4	–	4	5	–	6
Stony Brook	4	–	4	5	–	7
Albany	3	–	5	7	–	5
Towson	2	–	6	4	–	8
Rhode Island	1	–	7	1	–	11
Elon	0	–	8	1	–	11
$ – Conference champion; ^ – FCS playoff participant; Rankings from The Sports Network poll

The 2014 William & Mary Tribe football team represented the College of William & Mary as a member of the Colonial Athletic Association (CAA) in the 2014 NCAA Division I FCS football season. The Tribe were led by 35th-year head coach Jimmye Laycock played their home games at Zable Stadium. They finished the season 7–5 overall and 4–4 in CAA play to place in a four-way tie for fifth.

William & Mary's game against Towson on November 15 was Laycock's 400th game as a college football head coach. He became the 18th coach all-time and 6th active coach to accomplish this feat.

== Schedule ==
Date	Time	Opponent	Rank	Site	TV	Result	Attendance
August 30	4:00 pm	at Virginia Tech*	No. 19	Lane Stadium; Blacksburg, VA	ESPNews	L 9–34	62,722
September 6	6:00 pm	at Hampton*	No. 21	Armstrong Stadium; Hampton, VA		W 42–14	3,338
September 13	7:00 pm	Norfolk State*	No. 16	Zable Stadium; Williamsburg, VA	TATV	W 29–14	8,254
September 20	7:00 pm	Lafayette*	No. 13	Zable Stadium; Williamsburg, VA	TATV	W 33–19	9,137
September 27	6:00 pm	at Stony Brook	No. 12	Kenneth P. LaValle Stadium; Stony Brook, NY		W 27–21 ^{OT}	11,301
October 11	3:30 pm	at No. 4 New Hampshire	No. 10	Cowell Stadium; Durham, NH	NBCSN	L 3–32	18,774
October 18	3:30 pm	No. 5 Villanova^{†}	No. 15	Zable Stadium; Williamsburg, VA	TATV	L 31–35	10,764
October 25	12:30 pm	Delaware	No. 18	Zable Stadium; Williamsburg, VA (rivalry)	CSN	W 31–17	7,614
November 1	3:30 pm	at James Madison	No. 17	Bridgeforth Stadium; Harrisonburg, VA (rivalry)	ASN	L 24–31	21,778
November 8	3:30 pm	Elon	No. 24	Zable Stadium; Williamsburg, VA	CSN	W 17–7	9,512
November 15	3:00 pm	at Towson	No. 24	Johnny Unitas Stadium; Towson, MD	CSN	W 37–14	6,091
November 22	7:30 pm	No. 21 Richmond	No. 19	Zable Stadium; Williamsburg, VA (Capital Cup)	NBCSN	L 20–34	8,665
*Non-conference game; ^{†}Homecoming; Rankings from The Sports Network Poll released prior to the game; All times are in Eastern time

== Rankings ==
Ranking movements Legend: ██ Increase in ranking ██ Decrease in ranking RV = Received votes
	Week														
Poll	Pre	1	2	3	4	5	6	7	8	9	10	11	12	13	Final
Sports Network	19	21	16	13	12	12	10	15	18	17	24	24	22	23	RV
Coaches	22	24	19	17	13	13	11	18	20	17	25	23	19	24	Not released
