= The Me and You Show =

American sketch comedy series (2021–2023)

- Genre: Sketch comedy
- Created by: Zack Bornstein
- Country of origin: United States
- Original language: English
- No. of seasons: 2
- No. of episodes: 21

Production
- Executive producers: Jason Berger; Zack Bornstein; Kevin Healey; Luke Kelly-Clyne; Amy Laslett
- Production companies: Snap Inc. Big Breakfast; Kids at Play

Original release
- Network: Snapchat
- Release: October 1, 2021 – March 3, 2023

The Me and You Show is an American sketch comedy series that premiered on Snapchat on October 1, 2021. It is Snapchat's first effort exploring augmented reality programming.

The Me and You Show was renewed for a second season, which premiered on November 25, 2022. The first season was streamed by over 50 million viewers.

== Episodes ==
=== Season 1 (2021) ===
No.	Title	Directed by	Written by	Original release date
1	"Star in Your Own Heist Movie!"	Michael Schaubach	Zack Bornstein	October 1, 2021
2	"Get in Shape with Your BFF"	Michael Schaubach	Zack Bornstein	October 8, 2021
3	"This Prank Did Not Go as Planned..."	Michael Schaubach	Zack Bornstein	October 15, 2021
4	"This Concert Is Straight Fire"	Michael Schaubach	Zack Bornstein	October 22, 2021
5	"The Mayor Is Calling... You?"	Michael Schaubach	Zack Bornstein	October 29, 2021
6	"Breaking News! It's About U..."	Michael Schaubach	Zack Bornstein	November 5, 2021
7	"Waking Up After Coma Like..."	Michael Schaubach	Zack Bornstein	November 12, 2021
8	"The Best Team Has Arrived"	Michael Schaubach	Zack Bornstein	November 19, 2021
9	"Never Let Your BFF Teach You to Drive!"	Michael Schaubach	Zack Bornstein	November 26, 2021
10	"What If You Had Your Own Late Night Show?"	Michael Schaubach	Zack Bornstein	December 3, 2021
11	"What Can't U Do with Your Best Friend?"	Michael Schaubach	Zack Bornstein	December 10, 2021
12	"This Is a Dance Battle Like No Other..."	Michael Schaubach	Zack Bornstein	December 17, 2021
13	"Would U Do a Seance with Your BFF?"	Michael Schaubach	Zack Bornstein	December 24, 2021
14	"You Were Warned to Stay Out..."	Michael Schaubach	Zack Bornstein	December 31, 2021

=== Season 2 (2022–23) ===
No. overall	No. in season	Title	Directed by	Written by	Original release date
15	1	"Can You Defeat Black Friday Shopping?"	Michael Schaubach	Lily Du	November 25, 2022
16	2	"How Will U & Ur BFF Decorate Your Christmas Tree?"	Michael Schaubach	Lily Du	December 2, 2022
17	3	"Could U & Ur BFF Be Santa's Helper?"	Michael Schaubach	Cynthia Kao	December 9, 2022
18	4	"Will U & Ur BFF Beat This Clock?"	Michael Schaubach	Cynthia Kao	December 16, 2022
19	5	"Cat Dates Are How You Secure the Money Bag with Your BFF?"	Michael Schaubach	Jed Feiman & Nehemiah Markos	December 23, 2022
20	6	"Are You Really BFF's If U Don't Do This?"	Michael Schaubach	Jed Feiman & Nehemiah Markos	February 3, 2023
21	7	"Don't Miss These VDay Life Hacks with Ur BFF!"	Michael Schaubach	Lily Du	February 10, 2023
22	8	"Who Know More About The Big Game U Or Ur BFF?"	Michael Schaubach	Jed Feiman & Nehemiah Markos	February 17, 2023
23	9	"Which Friend Are U?"	Michael Schaubach	Cynthia Kao	February 24, 2023
24	10	"This Is The Scariest Thing We Ever Seen"	Michael Schaubach	Cynthia Kao	March 3, 2023
