= Dave Brock (American football) =

American football coach (born 1967)

Rutgers Scarlet Knights
- Title: Wide receivers coach

Personal information
- Born: June 5, 1967 (age 59); Moorestown, New Jersey U.S.

Career information
- College: Ferrum

Career history
- Salisbury (1988−1990) Graduate assistant; W. Connecticut State (1991−1993) Defensive backs coach; Salisbury (1994) Defensive backs coach; Hofstra (1995−1996) Running backs coach; Hofstra (1997−1999) Wide receivers coach; Hofstra (2000−2001) Offensive coordinator & wide receivers coach; Temple (2002−2004) Offensive coordinator & quarterbacks coach; North Carolina (2005) Wide receivers coach; North Carolina (2006) Assistant head coach; Kansas State (2007) Wide receivers coach; Kansas State (2008) Offensive coordinator & tight ends coach; Boston College (2009−2011) Tight ends coach; Rutgers (2012) Offensive coordinator & wide receivers coach; Delaware (2013–2016) Head coach; Atlanta Falcons (2017–2018) Assistant wide receivers coach; Atlanta Falcons (2019) Running backs coach; Atlanta Falcons (2019–2021) Wide receivers coach; Texas (2022) Analyst; Rutgers (2023–present) Wide receivers coach

Head coaching record
- Career: NCAA: 19–22 (.463)

David Brock (born June 5, 1967) is an American football coach. He previously was the head coach of University of Delaware Delaware Fightin' Blue Hens from 2013 to 2016.

== Coaching career ==
=== College ===
After playing one season of college football for Ferrum College, Brock became an assistant coach for Salisbury University in 1988. He moved on to Western Connecticut State University in 1991 as the football team's recruiting coordinator and defensive backs coach. After three seasons with Western Connecticut State, he went back to Salisbury to earn his bachelor's degree and work as the recruiting coordinator and defensive backs coach in 1994. He was hired by Hofstra as a running backs coach in 1995. Brock was promoted to recruiting coordinator and wide receivers coach in 1997, offensive coordinator and wide receivers coach in 2000, and associate head coach and offensive coordinator in 2002. He spent the 2002 through 2004 seasons with the Temple Owls as the team's offensive coordinator and quarterbacks coach. In 2005, he was hired as North Carolina's wide receivers coach, and he was promoted to assistant head coach and recruiting coordinator in 2006. The Kansas State Wildcats hired him as the team's wide receivers coach in 2007, and he was promoted to offensive coordinator and tight ends coach in 2008. He was Boston College's tight ends coach from 2009 to 2011 before becoming the Rutgers Scarlet Knights offensive coordinator and wide receivers coach in 2012. He was hired as the head coach for Delaware on January 18, 2013.

Brock was relieved of his duties as head coach on October 16, 2016, as announced by University of Delaware athletic director Christine Rawak.

=== NFL ===
==== Atlanta Falcons ====
On February 17, 2017, Brock was hired by the Atlanta Falcons as their assistant wide receivers coach. After being moved to running backs coach to start the 2019 season, he returned to coaching wide receivers on November 4.

== Head coaching record ==
=== College ===
| Year | Team | Overall | Conference | Standing | Bowl/playoffs |
|---|---|---|---|---|---|
Delaware Fightin' Blue Hens (Colonial Athletic Association) (2013–2016)
| 2013 | Delaware | 7−5 | 4−4 | T−5th | |
| 2014 | Delaware | 6−6 | 4−4 | T−5th | |
| 2015 | Delaware | 4−7 | 3−5 | T−7th | |
| 2016 | Delaware | 2−4 | 0−3 | | |
| Delaware: | | 19−22 | 11−16 | | |
| Total: | | 19−22 | | | |
