= 2014 Villanova Wildcats football team =

American college football season

2014 Villanova Wildcats football

FCS Playoffs Quarterfinals vs. Sam Houston State, L 31–34
- Conference: Colonial Athletic Association

Ranking
- Sports Network: No. 7
- FCS Coaches: No. 7
- Record: 11–3 (7–1 CAA)
- Head coach: Andy Talley (30th season)
- Offensive coordinator: Sam Venuto (16th season)
- Offensive scheme: Multiple spread
- Defensive coordinator: Billy Crocker (3rd season)
- Base defense: 3–3–5
- Home stadium: Villanova Stadium

2014 Colonial Athletic Association football standings
	Conf.			Overall
Team	W		L	W		L
No. 3 New Hampshire $^	8	–	0	12	–	2
No. 7 Villanova ^	7	–	1	11	–	3
No. 18 James Madison ^	6	–	2	9	–	4
No. 16 Richmond ^	5	–	3	9	–	5
William & Mary	4	–	4	7	–	5
Delaware	4	–	4	6	–	6
Maine	4	–	4	5	–	6
Stony Brook	4	–	4	5	–	7
Albany	3	–	5	7	–	5
Towson	2	–	6	4	–	8
Rhode Island	1	–	7	1	–	11
Elon	0	–	8	1	–	11
$ – Conference champion; ^ – FCS playoff participant; Rankings from The Sports Network poll

The 2014 Villanova Wildcats football team represented Villanova University in the 2014 NCAA Division I FCS football season. They were led by 30th-year head coach Andy Talley and played their home games at Villanova Stadium. They were a member of the Colonial Athletic Association. They finished the season 11–3, 7–1 in CAA play to finish in second place. They received an at-large bid to the FCS Playoffs where they defeated Liberty in the second round before losing in the quarterfinals to Sam Houston State.

== Schedule ==
Date	Time	Opponent	Rank	Site	TV	Result	Attendance
August 29	7:30 pm	at Syracuse*	No. 12	Carrier Dome; Syracuse, NY	ESPN3	L 26–27 ^{2OT}	41,189
September 6	3:30 pm	No. 11 Fordham*	No. 10	Villanova Stadium; Villanova, PA	ASN	W 50–6	6,151
September 20	12:30 pm	James Madison	No. 8	Villanova Stadium; Villanova, PA	CSN	W 49–31	10,781
September 27	3:00 pm	at Penn*	No. 6	Franklin Field; Philadelphia, PA		W 41–7	12,353
October 4	12:30 pm	at Maine	No. 6	Alfond Stadium; Orono, ME		W 41–20	5,173
October 11	1:00 pm	Rhode Island	No. 6	Villanova Stadium; Villanova, PA	NNAA	W 44–21	3,611
October 18	3:30 pm	at No. 15 William & Mary	No. 5	Zable Stadium; Williamsburg, VA		W 35–31	10,764
October 25	3:30 pm	Morgan State*^{†}	No. 5	Villanova Stadium; Villanova, PA	NNAA	W 48–28	7,821
November 1	12:30 pm	at No. 13 Richmond	No. 4	E. Claiborne Robins Stadium; Richmond, VA	CSN	L 9–10	7,902
November 8	7:00 pm	Towson	No. 7	Villanova Stadium; Villanova, PA		W 42–14	4,529
November 15	7:00 pm	Albany	No. 6	Villanova Stadium; Villanova, PA	ASN	W 48–31	4,541
November 22	12:00 pm	at Delaware	No. 6	Delaware Stadium; Newark, DE (Battle of the Blue)		W 35–28	17,056
December 6	4:30 pm	No. 20 Liberty*	No. 5	Villanova Stadium; Villanova, PA (NCAA Division I Second Round)	ESPN3	W 29–22	3,113
December 13	1:00 pm	No. 19 Sam Houston State*	No. 5	Villanova Stadium; Villanova, PA (NCAA Division I Quarterfinal)	ESPN3	L 31–34	2,333
*Non-conference game; ^{†}Homecoming; Rankings from The Sports Network Poll released prior to the game; All times are in Eastern time

== Game summaries ==
=== At Syracuse ===
	1	2	3	4	OT	2OT	Total
#12 Wildcats	0	7	7	3	3	6	26
Orange	7	3	7	0	3	7	27

=== Fordham ===
	1	2	3	4	Total
#11 Rams	3	0	3	0	6
#10 Wildcats	7	26	7	10	50

=== James Madison ===
	1	2	3	4	Total
Dukes	0	21	3	7	31
#8 Wildcats	7	7	14	21	49

=== At Penn ===
	1	2	3	4	Total
#6 Wildcats	21	20	0	0	41
Quakers	0	7	0	0	7

=== At Maine ===
	1	2	3	4	Total
#6 Wildcats	7	14	13	7	41
Black Bears	7	6	0	7	20

=== Rhode Island ===
	1	2	3	4	Total
Rams	0	0	0	21	21
#6 Wildcats	16	21	0	7	44

=== At William and Mary ===
	1	2	3	4	Total
#5 Wildcats	14	0	14	7	35
Tribe	7	14	3	7	31

=== Morgan State ===
	1	2	3	4	Total
Bears	7	14	0	7	28
#5 Wildcats	14	7	27	0	48

=== At Richmond ===
	1	2	3	4	Total
#4 Wildcats	0	3	6	0	9
Spiders	0	0	10	0	10

=== Towson ===
	1	2	3	4	Total
Tigers	7	0	7	0	14
#7 Wildcats	7	14	0	21	42

=== Albany ===
	1	2	3	4	Total
Great Danes	7	3	7	14	31
#6 Wildcats	14	14	14	6	48

=== At Delaware ===
	1	2	3	4	Total
#6 Wildcats	13	7	7	8	35
Blue Hens	0	7	7	14	28

== FCS Playoffs ==
=== Liberty (FCS Playoffs Second Round) ===
	1	2	3	4	Total
#20 Flames	10	9	3	0	22
#5 Wildcats	0	14	0	15	29

=== Sam Houston State (FCS Playoff Quarterfinal) ===
	1	2	3	4	Total
#19 Bearkats	7	10	7	10	34
#5 Wildcats	13	3	8	7	31

== Ranking movements ==
Ranking movements Legend: ██ Increase in ranking ██ Decrease in ranking
	Week														
Poll	Pre	1	2	3	4	5	6	7	8	9	10	11	12	13	Final
Sports Network	12	10	8	8	6	6	6	5	5	4	7	6	6	5	5
Coaches	13	7	7	7	5	5	5	4	4	3	7	6	6	5	5
