= John Robertson (American football) =

American football player (born 1993)

No. 19
- Position: Quarterback

Personal information
- Born: March 30, 1993 (age 33); Paramus, New Jersey, U.S.
- Listed height: 6 ft 2 in (1.88 m)
- Listed weight: 221 lb (100 kg)

Career information
- High school: Paramus
- College: Villanova (2011–2015)
- NFL draft: 2016: undrafted

Awards and highlights
- Walter Payton Award (2014); Jerry Rice Award (2012); CAA Offensive Player of the Year (2014); CAA Offensive Rookie of the Year (2012); First-team All-CAA (2014); Second-team All-CAA (2013); Third-team All-CAA (2012)

John Robertson (born March 30, 1993) is an American former football quarterback.

== College career ==
He played for Villanova.

Robertson was selected as the 2012 winner of the Jerry Rice Award as the top freshman in the Football Championship Subdivision (FCS).

He finished 9th in the 2013 Walter Payton Award voting.

Robertson was selected as the 2014 winner of the Walter Payton Award. During the 2014 season, Robertson threw for 2,846 yards and 35 touchdowns. He also ran for 1,078 yards and 11 touchdowns. He suffered a concussion late in the season and chose to sit out the FCS playoff quarterfinal. Early in the 2015 season, Robertson suffered a torn PCL in his right knee.

Born and raised in Paramus, New Jersey, Robertson played high school football at Paramus High School. Robertson has a master's degree in business administration.

== Professional career ==
After not being selected in the 2016 NFL draft, Robertson attended Baltimore Ravens rookie minicamp.

== College statistics ==
Year	Team	Attempts	Completions	Completion %	Yards	TDs	INT	Rushes	Yards	TDs
2011	Villanova	0	0	0%	0	0	0	1	1	0
2012	Villanova	253	152	60.1%	1965	14	7	189	1021	14
2013	Villanova	247	169	68.4%	1957	13	7	217	1405	20
2014	Villanova	301	197	65.4%	2846	35	3	227	1078	11
2015	Villanova	74	43	58.1%	522	3	1	50	138	3
Totals		875	561	64.1%	7300	65	18	684	3643	48
