= 2018 Towson Tigers football team =

American college football season

2018 Towson Tigers football

NCAA Division I First Round, L 10–31 vs. Duquesne
- Conference: Colonial Athletic Association

Ranking
- STATS: No. 20
- FCS Coaches: No. 22
- Record: 7–5 (5–3 CAA)
- Head coach: Rob Ambrose (10th season)
- Offensive coordinator: Jared Ambrose (7th season)
- Defensive coordinator: Lyndon Johnson (2nd season)
- Home stadium: Johnny Unitas Stadium

2018 Colonial Athletic Association football standings
	Conf.			Overall
Team	W		L	W		L
No. 4 Maine $^	7	–	1	10	–	4
No. 9 James Madison ^	6	–	2	9	–	4
No. 16 Stony Brook ^	5	–	3	7	–	5
No. 20 Towson ^	5	–	3	7	–	5
No. 24 Delaware ^	5	–	3	7	–	5
No. 19 Elon ^	4	–	3	6	–	5
Rhode Island	4	–	4	6	–	5
William & Mary	3	–	4	4	–	6
New Hampshire	3	–	5	4	–	7
Villanova	2	–	6	5	–	6
Richmond	2	–	6	4	–	7
Albany	1	–	7	3	–	8
$ – Conference champion; ^ – FCS playoff participant; Rankings from STATS Poll

The 2018 Towson Tigers football team represented Towson University in the 2018 NCAA Division I FCS football season. They were led by tenth-year head coach Rob Ambrose and played their home games at Johnny Unitas Stadium. They are a member of the Colonial Athletic Association. They finished the season 7–5, 5–3 in CAA play to finish in a three-way tie for third place. They received an at-large bid to the FCS Playoffs where they lost in the first round to Duquesne.

== Preseason ==
=== CAA Poll ===
In the CAA preseason poll released on July 24, 2018, the Tigers were predicted to finish in tenth place. They did not have any players selected to the preseason all-CAA team.

== Schedule ==
Date	Time	Opponent	Rank	Site	TV	Result	Attendance
September 1	7:00 p.m.	at Morgan State*		Hughes Stadium; Baltimore, MD (The Battle for Greater Baltimore)	MeTV Baltimore/SPORTSfever/ESPN3	W 36–10	9,209
September 8	12:00 p.m.	at Wake Forest*		BB&T Field; Winston-Salem, NC	ACCN Extra	L 20–51	23,619
September 15	3:30 p.m.	at No. 10 Villanova		Villanova Stadium; Villanova, PA	FCS/FSGO	W 45–35	5,719
September 29	4:00 p.m.	The Citadel*	No. 25	Johnny Unitas Stadium; Towson, MD	CAA.tv	W 44–27	7,323
October 6	4:00 p.m.	No. 13 Stony Brook	No. 23	Johnny Unitas Stadium; Towson, MD	CBSI Digital/CBS SportsLive	W 52–28	4,614
October 13	4:00 p.m.	William & Mary	No. 17	Johnny Unitas Stadium; Towson, MD	CAA.tv	W 29–13	8,022
October 20	3:30 p.m.	at Albany	No. 13	Bob Ford Field at Tom & Mary Casey Stadium; Albany, NY	UAlbany Live Events	W 56–28	7,029
October 27	3:30 p.m.	at No. 21 Delaware	No. 10	Delaware Stadium; Newark, DE	FCS/FSGO	L 36–40	14,593
November 3	4:00 p.m.	No. 23 Maine	No. 15	Johnny Unitas Stadium; Towson, MD	CBSI Digital/CBS SportsLive	L 28–35	7,356
November 10	12:00 p.m.	at No. 7 Elon	No. 20	Rhodes Stadium; Elon, NC	CAA.tv	W 41–10	5,927
November 17	2:00 p.m.	No. 7 James Madison	No. 15	Johnny Unitas Stadium; Towson, MD	CBSI Digital/CBS SportsLive	L 17–38	7,208
November 24	2:00 p.m.	Duquesne	No. 16	Johnny Unitas Stadium; Towson, MD (NCAA Division I First Round)	ESPN3	L 10–31	2,158
*Non-conference game; Rankings from STATS Poll released prior to the game; All times are in Eastern time

== Game summaries ==
=== At Morgan State ===
	1	2	3	4	Total
Tigers	3	14	14	5	36
Bears	7	0	3	0	10

=== At Wake Forest ===
Week Two: Towson Tigers at Wake Forest Demon Deacons – Game summary

Quarter	1	2	3	4	Total
Tigers	14	6	0	0	20
Demon Deacons	14	24	3	10	51

at BB&T Field • Winston-Salem, NC

- Date: September 8
- Game time: 12:00 p.m. ET
- Game weather: 82 °F (28 °C) • ESE 5 mph (8.0 km/h) • Overcast
- Game attendance: 23,619
- Referee: Jeff Heaser
- TV announcers (ACCN Extra): Play-by-Play: Shawn Kenney • Color Analyst: Stan Lewter

Game information

First Quarter

- 11:39 WAKE – Alex Bachman 10-yard pass from Sam Hartman (Nick Sciba kick), Demon Deacons 7–0. Drive: 13 plays, 74 yards, TOP 3:21
- 8:12 TOW – Sam Gallahan 24-yard pass from Tom Flacco (Aidan O'Neill kick), Tied 7–7. Drive: 8 plays, 68 yards, TOP 3:27
- 7:11 WAKE – Greg Dortch 7-yard pass from Sam Hartman (Nick Sciba kick), Demon Deacons 14–7. Drive: 3 plays, 62 yards, TOP 1:01
- 1:32 TOW – Shane Simpson 8-yard pass from Tom Flacco (Aidan O'Neill kick), Tied 14–14. Drive: 5 plays, 23 yards, TOP 1:25

Second Quarter

- 14:19 WAKE – Sam Hartman 14-yard run (Nick Sciba kick), Demon Deacons 21–14. Drive: 7 plays, 73 yards, TOP 2:13
- 11:37 WAKE – Nick Sciba 35-yard field goal, Demon Deacons 24–14. Drive: 10 plays, 54 yards, TOP 2:35
- 9:49 WAKE – Greg Dortch 70-yard punt return (Nick Sciba kick), Demon Deacons 31–14. Drive: 4 plays, 4 yards, TOP 1:48
- 2:02 WAKE – Greg Dortch 60-yard punt return (Nick Sciba kick), Demon Deacons 38–14. Drive: 3 plays, 7 yards, TOP 1:23
- 0:42 TOW – Shane Leatherbury 18-yard pass from Tom Flacco (two-point pass conv. failed), Demon Deacons 38–20. Drive: 9 plays, 80 yards, TOP 1:20

Third Quarter

- 3:53 WAKE – Nick Sciba 27-yard field goal, Demon Deacons 41–20. Drive: 9 plays, 48 yards, TOP 2:22

Fourth Quarter

- 14:03 WAKE – Cade Carney 1-yard run (Nick Sciba kick), Demon Deacons 48–20. Drive: 11 plays, 91 yards, TOP 3:07
- 9:04 WAKE – Nick Sciba 27-yard field goal, Demon Deacons 51–20. Drive: 7 plays, 68 yards, TOP 3:39

Top Passers

- TOW – Tom Flacco, 35/51, 345 yards, 3 touchdowns, 1 interception
- WAKE – Sam Hartman, 17/27, 242 yards, 2 touchdowns, 1 interception

Top Rushers

- TOW – Shane Simpson, 8 carries, 18 yards
- WAKE – Cade Carney, 19 carries, 130 yards, 1 touchdown

Top Receiving

- TOW – Shane Leatherbury, 8 receptions, 88 yards, 1 touchdown
- WAKE – Greg Dortch, 7 receptions, 94 yards, 1 touchdown

Leading Tacklers

- TOW – Diondre Wallace, 16 tackles
- WAKE – Nate Mays, 8 tackles

Player of the Week

- Greg Dortch (ACC Specialist of the Week)

=== At Villanova ===
	1	2	3	4	Total
Tigers	21	14	7	3	45
No. 10 Wildcats	14	7	7	7	35

=== The Citadel ===
	1	2	3	4	Total
Bulldogs	3	7	14	3	27
No. 25 Tigers	7	17	17	3	44

=== Stony Brook ===
	1	2	3	4	Total
No. 13 Seawolves	0	14	7	7	28
No. 23 Tigers	21	14	10	7	52

=== William & Mary ===
	1	2	3	4	Total
Tribe	0	13	0	0	13
No. 17 Tigers	7	3	7	12	29

=== At Albany ===
	1	2	3	4	Total
No. 13 Tigers	10	28	11	7	56
Great Danes	7	14	0	7	28

=== At Delaware ===
	1	2	3	4	Total
No. 10 Tigers	5	13	10	8	36
No. 21 Fightin' Blue Hens	0	6	21	13	40

=== Maine ===
	1	2	3	4	Total
No. 23 Black Bears	7	14	7	7	35
No. 15 Tigers	0	7	14	7	28

=== At Elon ===
	1	2	3	4	Total
No. 20 Tigers	7	7	10	17	41
No. 7 Phoenix	0	3	7	0	10

=== James Madison ===
	1	2	3	4	Total
No. 7 Dukes	7	17	7	7	38
No. 15 Tigers	7	3	0	7	17

== FCS Playoffs ==
=== Duquesne–First Round ===
	1	2	3	4	Total
Dukes	0	3	14	14	31
No. 16 Tigers	7	3	0	0	10

== Ranking movements ==
Ranking movements Legend: ██ Increase in ranking ██ Decrease in ranking — = Not ranked RV = Received votes
	Week													
Poll	Pre	1	2	3	4	5	6	7	8	9	10	11	12	Final
STATS FCS	—	—	—	RV	25	23	17	13	10	15	20	15	16	20
Coaches	—	—	—	RV	RV	24	18	14	10	15	20	16	19	22
