= 2018 Delaware Fightin' Blue Hens football team =

American college football season

2018 Delaware Fightin' Blue Hens football

NCAA Division I First Round, L 6–20 at James Madison
- Conference: Colonial Athletic Association

Ranking
- STATS: No. 24
- FCS Coaches: No. 23
- Record: 7–5 (5–3 CAA)
- Head coach: Danny Rocco (2nd season)
- Offensive coordinator: Sean Devine (2nd season)
- Offensive scheme: Multiple
- Defensive coordinator: Chris Cosh (2nd season)
- Base defense: 4–3
- Home stadium: Delaware Stadium

2018 Colonial Athletic Association football standings
	Conf.			Overall
Team	W		L	W		L
No. 4 Maine $^	7	–	1	10	–	4
No. 9 James Madison ^	6	–	2	9	–	4
No. 16 Stony Brook ^	5	–	3	7	–	5
No. 20 Towson ^	5	–	3	7	–	5
No. 24 Delaware ^	5	–	3	7	–	5
No. 19 Elon ^	4	–	3	6	–	5
Rhode Island	4	–	4	6	–	5
William & Mary	3	–	4	4	–	6
New Hampshire	3	–	5	4	–	7
Villanova	2	–	6	5	–	6
Richmond	2	–	6	4	–	7
Albany	1	–	7	3	–	8
$ – Conference champion; ^ – FCS playoff participant; Rankings from STATS Poll

The 2018 Delaware Fightin' Blue Hens football team represented the University of Delaware as a member of the Colonial Athletic Association (CAA) during the 2018 NCAA Division I FCS football season. Led by second-year head coach Danny Rocco, the Fightin' Blue Hens compiled an overall record of 7–5 with a mark of 5–3 in conference play, placing in a three-way tie for third in the CAA. Delaware received an at-large bid to the NCAA Division I Football Championship playoffs, the Fightin' Blue Hens they lost in the first round to James Madison. The team played home games at Delaware Stadium in Newark, Delaware.

== Preseason ==
=== CAA Poll ===
In the CAA preseason poll released on July 24, 2018, the Fightin' Blue Hens were predicted to finish in third place.

=== Preseason All-CAA Team ===
The Fightin' Blue Hens had five players selected to the preseason all-CAA team.

Offense

Kani Kane – RB

Charles Scarff – TE

Mario Farinella – OL

Defense

Tony Reeder – LB

Nasir Adderley – S

=== Award watch lists ===
Award	Player	Position	Year
Buck Buchanan Award	Nasir Adderley	S	SR
Buck Buchanan Award	Troy Reeder	LB	R-SR

== Schedule ==
Date	Time	Opponent	Rank	Site	TV	Result	Attendance
August 30	7:00 p.m.	Rhode Island	No. 15	Delaware Stadium; Newark, DE	CBSI Digital, CBS SportsLive	L 19–21	17,945
September 8	3:30 p.m.	Lafayette*		Delaware Stadium; Newark, DE	MASN	W 37–0	12,781
September 15	3:30 p.m.	Cornell*		Delaware Stadium; Newark, DE	BHAA	W 27–10	14,511
September 22	2:00 p.m.	at No. 1 North Dakota State*		Fargodome; Fargo, ND	ESPN+	L 10–38	18,883
October 6	3:00 p.m.	at Richmond		E. Claiborne Robins Stadium; Richmond, VA	NBCS WA	W 43–28	8,217
October 13	3:30 p.m.	No. 5 Elon		Delaware Stadium; Newark, DE	NBCS PHIL	W 28–16	19,209
October 20	3:30 p.m.	at New Hampshire	No. 24	Wildcat Stadium; Durham, NH	CBSI Digital, CBS SportsLive	W 38–14	11,992
October 27	3:30 p.m.	No. 10 Towson^{†}	No. 21	Delaware Stadium; Newark, DE	FCS, FSGO	W 40–36	14,593
November 3	3:30 p.m.	at Albany	No. 13	Bob Ford Field at Tom & Mary Casey Stadium; Albany, NY	UAlbany Live Events	W 21–16	3,182
November 10	1:00 p.m.	at No. 12 Stony Brook	No. 11	Kenneth P. LaValle Stadium; Stony Brook, NY	CBSI Digital/CBS SportsLive	L 3–17	6,667
November 17	12:00 p.m.	Villanova	No. 17	Delaware Stadium; Newark, DE (Battle of the Blue)	NBCS PHIL	L 21–42	18,752
November 24	3:00 p.m.	at No. 6 James Madison*	No. 21	Bridgeforth Stadium; Harrisonburg, VA (NCAA Division I First Round, rivalry)	ESPN3	L 6–20	7,297
*Non-conference game; ^{†}Homecoming; Rankings from STATS Poll released prior to the game; All times are in Eastern time

== Coaching staff ==
Name	Position	Year	Alma mater
Danny Rocco	Head coach	2nd	Wake Forest (1984)
Matt Simon	Offensive coordinator/running backs	2nd	Eastern New Mexico (1976)
Chris Cosh	Defensive coordinator/defensive backs	2nd	Virginia Tech (1984)
Erik Campbell	Passing game coordinator/wide receivers	2nd	Michigan (1988)
Bill Polin	Recruiting coordinator/offensive line	2nd	Colby (2000)
Manny Rojas	Inside Linebackers/co-special teams coordinator	2nd	Liberty (2007)
Clint Sintim	Outside Linebackers/co-special teams coordinator	2nd	Virginia (2009)
Alex Wood	Quarterbacks	1st	Iowa (1978)
Kevin Reihner	Offensive Assistant/tight ends	1st	Stanford (2015)
Levern Belin	Defensive line	2nd	Wake Forest (1991)
Nick Rapone	Cornerbacks	8th	Virginia Tech (1978)
Greg Meyer	Recruiting Assistant/offensive Quality Control	1st	Buffalo State (2009)
Jalen Kindle	Defensive assistant	1st	Delaware (2017)
Chris Stewart	Strength and conditioning	2nd	Western Carolina (1998)
Carl Kotz	Director of football operations	2nd	Clemson (2003)
Felicia Bergman	Director of Football Advising	2nd	Colorado State (2009)
Tony Palmieri	Video coordinator	2nd	North Florida (2009)
Jude Moser	Administrative Assistant	9th	University of Delaware (1984)

== Game summaries ==
=== Rhode Island ===
	1	2	3	4	Total
Rams	0	7	14	0	21
No. 15 Blue Hens	0	10	3	6	19

This marks the first time Delaware opens with a conference game since 2007 (49–31 win at William & Mary).

=== Lafayette ===
	1	2	3	4	Total
Leopards	0	0	0	0	0
Blue Hens	14	7	7	9	37

=== Cornell ===
	1	2	3	4	Total
Big Red	3	0	0	7	10
Blue Hens	7	7	0	13	27

=== At North Dakota State ===
	1	2	3	4	Total
Blue Hens	0	0	0	10	10
No. 1 Bison	28	7	3	0	38

- This marks Delaware's first trip west of the Mississippi River since the 2010 National Championship (a 19–20 loss to Eastern Washington).
- This marks Delaware's first game against a MVFC opponent since 2010 (a 26–3 win over South Dakota State).
- This marks Delaware's first ever regular season game west of the Mississippi River, and the first regular season game in the Central Time Zone since 1981 (a 38–14 win at Western Kentucky).

=== At Richmond ===
	1	2	3	4	Total
Blue Hens	19	14	10	0	43
Spiders	7	3	6	12	28

=== Elon ===
	1	2	3	4	Total
No. 5 Phoenix	7	3	6	0	16
Blue Hens	0	7	7	14	28

=== At New Hampshire ===
	1	2	3	4	Total
No. 24 Blue Hens	10	7	14	7	38
Wildcats	0	7	0	7	14

=== Towson ===
	1	2	3	4	Total
No. 10 Tigers	5	13	10	8	36
No. 21 Blue Hens	0	6	21	13	40

=== At Albany ===
	1	2	3	4	Total
No. 13 Blue Hens	0	12	3	6	21
Great Danes	0	3	7	6	16

=== At Stony Brook ===
	1	2	3	4	Total
No. 11 Blue Hens	0	0	0	3	3
No. 12 Seawolves	0	3	7	7	17

=== Villanova ===
	1	2	3	4	Total
Wildcats	14	7	7	14	42
No. 17 Blue Hens	7	0	14	0	21

=== At James Madison–NCAA Division I First Round ===
	1	2	3	4	Total
No. 21 Blue Hens	0	3	3	0	6
No. 6 Dukes	3	9	8	0	20

== Ranking movements ==
Ranking movements Legend: ██ Increase in ranking ██ Decrease in ranking RV = Received votes
	Week													
Poll	Pre	1	2	3	4	5	6	7	8	9	10	11	12	Final
STATS FCS	15	RV	RV	RV	RV	RV	RV	24	21	13	11	17	21	24
Coaches	16	RV	RV	RV	RV	RV	RV	25	21	16	12	18	23	23

== Players drafted into the NFL ==
Round	Pick	Player	Position	NFL Club
2	60	Nasir Adderley	S	Los Angeles Chargers
