= 2018 William & Mary Tribe football team =

American college football season

2018 William & Mary Tribe football
- Conference: Colonial Athletic Association
- Record: 4–6 (3–4 CAA)
- Head coach: Jimmye Laycock (39th season)
- Offensive coordinator: D. J. Mangas (2nd season)
- Defensive coordinator: Trevor Andrews (5th season)
- Captains: Jack Armstrong; Nate Atkins; Raeshawn Smith
- Home stadium: Zable Stadium

2018 Colonial Athletic Association football standings
	Conf.			Overall
Team	W		L	W		L
No. 4 Maine $^	7	–	1	10	–	4
No. 9 James Madison ^	6	–	2	9	–	4
No. 16 Stony Brook ^	5	–	3	7	–	5
No. 20 Towson ^	5	–	3	7	–	5
No. 24 Delaware ^	5	–	3	7	–	5
No. 19 Elon ^	4	–	3	6	–	5
Rhode Island	4	–	4	6	–	5
William & Mary	3	–	4	4	–	6
New Hampshire	3	–	5	4	–	7
Villanova	2	–	6	5	–	6
Richmond	2	–	6	4	–	7
Albany	1	–	7	3	–	8
$ – Conference champion; ^ – FCS playoff participant; Rankings from STATS Poll

The 2018 William & Mary Tribe football team represented the College of William & Mary as a member of the Colonial Athletic Association (CAA) in the 2018 NCAA Division I FCS football season. The Tribe, led by 39th-year head coach Jimmye Laycock, played their home games at Zable Stadium. They finished the season 4–6 overall and 3–4 in CAA play to place eighth.

On August 5, 2018, Laycock announced that he would be retiring after the conclusion of the 2018 season. He finished at William & Mary with a 39-year record of 249–194–2.

== Preseason ==
=== CAA poll ===
In the CAA preseason poll released on July 24, 2018, the Tribe were predicted to finish in eleventh place. They did not have any players selected to the preseason all-CAA team.

== Schedule ==
Date	Time	Opponent	Site	TV	Result	Attendance
September 1	6:00 p.m.	at Bucknell*	Christy Mathewson–Memorial Stadium; Lewisburg, PA	Stadium	W 14–7	5,042
September 8	2:00 p.m.	at No. 12 (FBS) Virginia Tech*	Lane Stadium; Blacksburg, VA	ESPN3	L 17–62	65,632
~~September 15~~	~~6:00 p.m.~~	No. 14 Elon	Zable Stadium; Williamsburg, VA	Cox Yurview	Canceled (Note: The Elon game was postponed due to Hurricane Florence; it was intended to be rescheduled, but was canceled on September 19, 2018.)	
September 22	3:30 p.m.	at No. 2 James Madison	Bridgeforth Stadium; Harrisonburg, VA (rivalry)	NBCS WA+	L 0–51	25,130
September 29	6:00 p.m.	No. 24 Colgate*	Zable Stadium; Williamsburg, VA	Cox Yurview	L 0–23	9,191
October 6	3:30 p.m.	Albany	Zable Stadium; Williamsburg, VA	Cox Yurview	W 25–22	7,530
October 13	4:00 p.m.	at No. 17 Towson	Johnny Unitas Stadium; Towson, MD	CAA.tv	L 13–29	8,022
October 20	3:30 p.m.	No. 16 Maine^{†}	Zable Stadium; Williamsburg, VA	Cox Yurview	W 27–20	10,462
October 27	12:00 p.m.	at Rhode Island	Meade Stadium; Kingston, RI	CAA.tv	L 10–21	1,688
November 10	1:00 p.m.	at Villanova	Villanova Stadium; Villanova, PA	FCS/FSGO	W 24–17	4,105
November 17	2:00 p.m.	Richmond	Zable Stadium; Williamsburg, VA (Capital Cup)	Cox Yurview	L 6–10	9,739
*Non-conference game; ^{†}Homecoming; Rankings from STATS Poll released prior to the game; All times are in Eastern time

== Game summaries ==
=== At Bucknell ===
	1	2	3	4	Total
Tribe	7	0	0	7	14
Bison	0	0	0	7	7

=== At Virginia Tech ===
	1	2	3	4	Total
Tribe	0	7	7	3	17
No. 12 (FBS) Hokies	17	21	17	7	62

=== At James Madison ===
	1	2	3	4	Total
Tribe	0	0	0	0	0
No. 2 Dukes	7	10	21	13	51

=== Colgate ===
	1	2	3	4	Total
No. 24 Raiders	10	6	7	0	23
Tribe	0	0	0	0	0

=== Albany ===
	1	2	3	4	Total
Great Danes	0	13	0	9	22
Tribe	7	3	0	15	25

=== At Towson ===
	1	2	3	4	Total
Tribe	0	13	0	0	13
No. 17 Tigers	7	3	7	12	29

=== Maine ===
	1	2	3	4	Total
No. 16 Black Bears	10	7	0	3	20
Tribe	7	7	3	10	27

=== At Rhode Island ===
	1	2	3	4	Total
Tribe	7	0	3	0	10
Rams	14	0	7	0	21

=== At Villanova ===
	1	2	3	4	Total
Tribe	0	14	10	0	24
Wildcats	0	7	0	10	17

=== Richmond ===
	1	2	3	4	Total
Spiders	0	7	3	0	10
Tribe	0	0	0	6	6
