= 2018 Albany Great Danes football team =

American college football season

2018 Albany Great Danes football
- Conference: Colonial Athletic Association
- Record: 3–8 (1–7 CAA)
- Head coach: Greg Gattuso (5th season)
- Offensive coordinator: Joe Davis (1st season)
- Co-defensive coordinators: Joe Bernard (1st season); Keith Dudzinski (1st season)
- Home stadium: Bob Ford Field at Tom & Mary Casey Stadium

2018 Colonial Athletic Association football standings
	Conf.			Overall
Team	W		L	W		L
No. 4 Maine $^	7	–	1	10	–	4
No. 9 James Madison ^	6	–	2	9	–	4
No. 16 Stony Brook ^	5	–	3	7	–	5
No. 20 Towson ^	5	–	3	7	–	5
No. 24 Delaware ^	5	–	3	7	–	5
No. 19 Elon ^	4	–	3	6	–	5
Rhode Island	4	–	4	6	–	5
William & Mary	3	–	4	4	–	6
New Hampshire	3	–	5	4	–	7
Villanova	2	–	6	5	–	6
Richmond	2	–	6	4	–	7
Albany	1	–	7	3	–	8
$ – Conference champion; ^ – FCS playoff participant; Rankings from STATS Poll

The 2018 Albany Great Danes football team represented the University at Albany, SUNY as a member of the Colonial Athletic Association (CAA) during the 2018 NCAA Division I FCS football season. Led by fifth-year head coach Greg Gattuso, the Great Danes compiled an overall record of 3–8 with a mark of 1–7 in conference play, placing last out of 12 teams in the CAA. The team played home games at Bob Ford Field at Tom & Mary Casey Stadium in Albany, New York.

== Preseason ==
=== CAA poll ===
In the CAA preseason poll released on July 24, 2018, the Great Danes were predicted to finish in ninth place.

=== Preseason All-CAA Team ===
The Great Danes had one player selected to the preseason all-CAA team.

Special teams

Donovan McDonald – PR

== Schedule ==
Date	Time	Opponent	Site	TV	Result	Attendance
September 1	3:30 p.m.	at Pittsburgh*	Heinz Field; Pittsburgh, PA	ACCN Extra	L 7–33	34,486
September 8	1:00 p.m.	at Rhode Island	Meade Stadium; Kingston, RI	FCS, FSGO	L 26–45	6,520
September 15	7:00 p.m.	Morgan State*	Bob Ford Field at Tom & Mary Casey Stadium; Albany, NY	UAlbany Live Events	W 30–27	6,503
September 22	7:00 p.m.	Saint Francis (PA)*	Bob Ford Field at Tom & Mary Casey Stadium; Albany, NY	UAlbany Live Events	W 35–28	3,840
October 6	3:30 p.m.	at William & Mary	Zable Stadium; Williamsburg, VA	Cox Yurview	L 22–25	7,530
October 13	7:00 p.m.	Richmond	Bob Ford Field at Tom & Mary Casey Stadium; Albany, NY	UAlbany Live Events	L 24–27	4,059
October 20	3:30 p.m.	No. 13 Towson^{†}	Bob Ford Field at Tom & Mary Casey Stadium; Albany, NY	UAlbany Live Events	L 28–56	7,029
October 27	1:00 p.m.	at No. 24 Maine	Alfond Stadium; Orono, ME	FCS	L 9–28	9,248
November 3	3:30 p.m.	No. 13 Delaware	Bob Ford Field at Tom & Mary Casey Stadium; Albany, NY	UAlbany Live Events	L 16–21	3,182
November 10	1:00 p.m.	at New Hampshire	Wildcat Stadium; Durham, NH	NBCS BOS	L 10–24	5,571
November 17	3:30 p.m.	No. 10 Stony Brook	Bob Ford Field at Tom & Mary Casey Stadium; Albany, NY (rivalry)	FCS, FSGO	W 25–23	2,483
*Non-conference game; ^{†}Homecoming; Rankings from STATS Poll released prior to the game; All times are in Eastern time

== Game summaries ==
=== At Pittsburgh ===
	1	2	3	4	Total
Great Danes	7	0	0	0	7
Panthers	19	14	0	0	33

=== At Rhode Island ===
	1	2	3	4	Total
Great Danes	7	0	0	19	26
Rams	14	17	14	0	45

=== Morgan State ===
	1	2	3	4	Total
Bears	0	13	7	7	27
Great Danes	3	14	3	10	30

=== Saint Francis (PA) ===
	1	2	3	4	Total
Red Flash	7	7	14	0	28
Great Danes	7	13	8	7	35

=== At William & Mary ===
	1	2	3	4	Total
Great Danes	0	13	0	9	22
Tribe	7	3	0	15	25

=== Richmond ===
	1	2	3	4	Total
Spiders	7	10	7	3	27
Great Danes	7	7	7	3	24

=== Towson ===
	1	2	3	4	Total
No. 13 Tigers	10	28	11	7	56
Great Danes	7	14	0	7	28

=== At Maine ===
	1	2	3	4	Total
Great Danes	0	0	3	6	9
No. 24 Black Bears	14	7	0	7	28

=== Delaware ===
	1	2	3	4	Total
No. 13 Fightin' Blue Hens	0	12	3	6	21
Great Danes	0	3	7	6	16

=== At New Hampshire ===
	1	2	3	4	Total
Great Danes	3	0	0	7	10
Wildcats	7	3	7	7	24

=== Stony Brook ===
	1	2	3	4	Total
No. 10 Seawolves	3	7	7	6	23
Great Danes	10	0	0	15	25
