= 2018 Stony Brook Seawolves football team =

American college football season

2018 Stony Brook Seawolves football

FCS Playoffs First Round, L 14–28 vs. Southeast Missouri State
- Conference: Colonial Athletic Association

Ranking
- STATS: No. 16
- FCS Coaches: No. 18
- Record: 7–5 (5–3 CAA)
- Head coach: Chuck Priore (13th season)
- Co-offensive coordinators: Carmen Felus (2nd season); Chris Bache (2nd season)
- Defensive coordinator: Bobby McIntyre (2nd season)
- Home stadium: Kenneth P. LaValle Stadium

2018 Colonial Athletic Association football standings
	Conf.			Overall
Team	W		L	W		L
No. 4 Maine $^	7	–	1	10	–	4
No. 9 James Madison ^	6	–	2	9	–	4
No. 16 Stony Brook ^	5	–	3	7	–	5
No. 20 Towson ^	5	–	3	7	–	5
No. 24 Delaware ^	5	–	3	7	–	5
No. 19 Elon ^	4	–	3	6	–	5
Rhode Island	4	–	4	6	–	5
William & Mary	3	–	4	4	–	6
New Hampshire	3	–	5	4	–	7
Villanova	2	–	6	5	–	6
Richmond	2	–	6	4	–	7
Albany	1	–	7	3	–	8
$ – Conference champion; ^ – FCS playoff participant; Rankings from STATS Poll

The 2018 Stony Brook Seawolves football team represented Stony Brook University in the 2018 NCAA Division I FCS football season. The Seawolves competed as sixth-year members of the Colonial Athletic Association with Chuck Priore as the head coach for his 13th season. They played their home games at Kenneth P. LaValle Stadium in Stony Brook, New York. They finished the season 7–5, 5–3 in CAA play to finish in a three-way tie for third place. They received an at-large berth to the FCS Playoffs, where they lost in the first round to Southeast Missouri State.

== Preseason ==
=== CAA poll ===
In the CAA preseason poll released on July 24, 2018, the Seawolves were predicted to finish in fourth place.

=== Preseason All-CAA Team ===
The Seawolves had two players selected to the preseason all-CAA team.

Offense

Cal Daniels – FB

Defense

Shayne Lawless – LB

== Schedule ==
Date	Time	Opponent	Rank	Site	TV	Result	Attendance
September 1	2:00 p.m.	at Air Force*	No. 20	Falcon Stadium; Colorado Springs, CO	Stadium	L 0–38	33,415
September 8	6:00 p.m.	Bryant*	No. 24	Kenneth P. LaValle Stadium; Stony Brook, NY	Wolfievision	W 50–21	5,708
September 15	6:00 p.m.	at Fordham*	No. 24	Coffey Field; Bronx, NY	Stadium	W 28–6	6,524
September 22	6:00 p.m.	Richmond	No. 20	Kenneth P. LaValle Stadium; Stony Brook, NY	CBSI Digital/CBS SportsLive	W 36–10	6,272
September 29	6:00 p.m.	No. 13 Villanova	No. 18	Kenneth P. LaValle Stadium; Stony Brook, NY	FCS/FSGO	W 29–27	7,720
October 6	4:00 p.m.	at No. 23 Towson	No. 13	Johnny Unitas Stadium; Towson, MD	CBSI Digital/CBS SportsLive	L 28–52	4,614
October 13	3:30 p.m.	at New Hampshire	No. 19	Wildcat Stadium; Durham, NH	CBSI Digital/CBS SportsLive	W 35–7	17,687
October 20	6:00 p.m.	No. 22 Rhode Island^{†}	No. 18	Kenneth P. LaValle Stadium; Stony Brook, NY		W 52–14	12,701
October 27	3:30 p.m.	at No. 3 James Madison	No. 15	Bridgeforth Stadium; Harrisonburg, VA	MASN/SNY	L 10–13	25,244
November 10	1:00 p.m.	No. 11 Delaware	No. 12	Kenneth P. LaValle Stadium; Stony Brook, NY	CBSI Digital/CBS SportsLive	W 17–3	6,667
November 17	3:30 p.m.	at Albany	No. 10	Bob Ford Field at Tom & Mary Casey Stadium; Albany, NY (rivalry)	FCS/FSGO	L 23–25	2,483
November 24	2:00 p.m.	at No. 20 Southeast Missouri State*	No. 15	Houck Stadium; Cape Girardeau, MO (FCS Playoffs First Round)	ESPN3	L 14–28	5,679
*Non-conference game; ^{†}Homecoming; Rankings from STATS Poll released prior to the game; All times are in Eastern time

- Source: Schedule

== Game summaries ==
=== At Air Force ===
	1	2	3	4	Total
No. 20 Seawolves	0	0	0	0	0
Falcons	14	10	0	14	38

In the season opener, the Seawolves were held to 75 yards of total offense as they were shut out in a road loss to FBS opponents Air Force. The Falcons gained 362 yards in comparison.

=== Bryant ===
	1	2	3	4	Total
Bulldogs	0	7	14	0	21
No. 24 Seawolves	13	7	14	16	50

In the team's home opener, the Seawolves jumped out to a quick 20–0 lead. However, Bryant scored three straight touchdowns to take a 21–20 lead, helped by turnovers from the Stony Brook offense. In the end, the "Long Island Express", the nickname for the senior running back duo of Jordan Gowins and Donald Liotine, managed to wear the Bulldogs defense down. Liotine gained 107 yards and Gowins gained 146 yards. The game ended on a 95-yard pick six from Stony Brook defensive back Damarcus Miller.

=== At Fordham ===
	1	2	3	4	Total
No. 24 Seawolves	7	14	7	0	28
Rams	0	0	0	6	6

The Seawolves traveled to nearby Bronx to play their final non-conference game of the season. Both members of the Long Island Express gained over 100 yards again, as Gowins gained 160 yards with a touchdown and Liotine gained 106 yards with a touchdown. Stony Brook's third defensive touchdown of the year came when defensive lineman Jordan Scarbrough returned a pick six 25 yards in the first quarter. Fordham was shut out until 2:14 in the fourth quarter.

=== Richmond ===
	1	2	3	4	Total
Spiders	3	0	7	0	10
No. 20 Seawolves	9	7	6	14	36

In the CAA opener, Richmond took a 3–0 lead and threatened to score more, but Stony Brook defensive back Gavin Heslop returned a Richmond fumble 87 yards for a touchdown. The work of the Long Island Express helped expand the lead, as Jordan Gowins had 192 yards with two touchdowns and Donald Liotine gained 133 yards. Stony Brook ended the game by scoring 20 consecutive points.

=== Villanova ===
	1	2	3	4	Total
No. 13 Wildcats	7	14	0	6	27
No. 18 Seawolves	0	6	17	6	29

Stony Brook fell behind early to Villanova, trailing 21–0 in the second quarter. A touchdown pass from quarterback Joe Carbone to wide receiver Julius Wingate scored the Seawolves' first points with 1:51 left in the half. The second half kickoff was fumbled by Villanova and recovered by Stony Brook, and Donald Liotine scored a touchdown to reduce the lead to 21–13. Carbone threw a second touchdown pass to Wingate, and a successful two-point conversion tied the game at 21. Villanova quarterback Zach Bednarczyk was called for intentional grounding in the end zone, leading to a safety that caused the Seawolves to lead 23–21. Carbone's third touchdown of the day, this time to Cal Daniels, extended the lead to 29–21 after a missed extra point. With :56 left, Villanova scored another touchdown to bring the lead to 29–27, but the Seawolves victory was ensured as the two-point conversion was batted down and the onside kick failed.

=== At Towson ===
	1	2	3	4	Total
No. 13 Seawolves	0	14	7	7	28
No. 23 Tigers	21	14	10	7	52

Stony Brook's four-game winning streak came to an end in Maryland, as the Towson Tigers, led by quarterback Tom Flacco (brother of Joe Flacco) jumped out to a 21–0 lead, kickstarted by running back Shane Simpson's opening kickoff return for a touchdown. The Seawolves defense forced two Towson turnovers, scoring on both successive drives to whittle their lead down to 21–14. However, Flacco threw two more touchdowns before halftime to bring the lead back to 35–14. Donald Liotine fumbled the second half kickoff, and Towson would continue to add to their lead as Stony Brook pulled their starters and were upset on the road.

=== At New Hampshire ===
	1	2	3	4	Total
No. 19 Seawolves	14	7	7	7	35
Wildcats	0	7	0	0	7

Reeling from last week's upset loss at Towson, Stony Brook traveled up to New Hampshire with one half of the Long Island Express, Jordan Gowins, out with an injury. Donald Liotine carried the load himself, collecting 163 yards on 32 carries. The Seawolves returned both an interception and a fumble for touchdowns, helping extend their lead to 21–0 in the second quarter. Backup running back Kameron Pickett scored his first career touchdown in the fourth quarter, sealing the 35–7 victory.

=== Rhode Island ===
	1	2	3	4	Total
No. 22 Rams	0	7	0	7	14
No. 18 Seawolves	10	14	14	14	52

On Stony Brook's Homecoming night, the Seawolves improved to 6–2 as they blew out No. 22 ranked Rhode Island. The Long Island Express returned to full force, with both Gowins and Liotine rushing for over 100 yards for the fourth time this season, tying a school record. Stony Brook gained 460 yards of total offense and scored five total rushing touchdowns. With 12,701 in attendance, this was the most watched home game in Stony Brook football history.

=== At James Madison ===
	1	2	3	4	Total
No. 15 Seawolves	0	10	0	0	10
No. 3 Dukes	7	0	0	6	13

Stony Brook traveled on the road to Harrisonburg, Virginia to face James Madison as three-touchdown underdogs. An early drive was ended in JMU territory as Joe Carbone was intercepted, and the Dukes took a 7–0 lead late in the first quarter. Donald Liotine tied the game with a 30-yard touchdown in the second quarterback, and a JMU fumble led to a Stony Brook field goal right before halftime as the Seawolves took a 10–7 lead and looked to upset the No. 3 ranked Dukes. The Seawolves drove deep into JMU territory in the third quarter, but Carbone was picked off again as Stony Brook threatened to extend their lead. Two fourth-quarter field goals by Dukes kicker Tyler Gray helped them take a 13–10 lead. Stony Brook got the ball back for one final drive, where Joe Carbone completed two passes on fourth down, including an acrobatic catch by Julius Wingate and a reception that would have gone for a touchdown had Wingate not tripped and fell. With three seconds left, the Seawolves tried a 51-yard field goal, but kicker Alex Lucansky's attempt ended up short and Stony Brook's upset bid ended in defeat.

=== Delaware ===
	1	2	3	4	Total
No. 11 Fightin' Blue Hens	0	0	0	3	3
No. 12 Seawolves	0	3	7	7	17

The Seawolves took on first-place Delaware on a cold, windy day in New York. Early promising Stony Brook drives stalled due to an interception and a botched snap, but Delaware could not capitalize on Stony Brook's mistakes, as kicker Frank Raggo missed two field goals and botched the snap of a third. Stony Brook kicked a field goal as time expired in the first half and scored a touchdown on 4th and 8 as Donavin Washington caught a Joe Carbone pass in the third quarter. The Seawolves extended their lead as a 33-yard run touchdown by Donald Liotine made it 17–3 with 5:27 left in the fourth quarter. Outgaining Delaware 400–201, Stony Brook's tough defense prevented the Blue Hens from ever making a serious comeback attempt.

=== At Albany ===
	1	2	3	4	Total
No. 10 Seawolves	3	7	7	6	23
Great Danes	10	0	0	15	25

In the final game of the regular season, Stony Brook traveled up to Albany to face a Great Danes team that was winless in CAA play for the Empire Clash. The Seawolves were down early despite being 18.5 point favorites, but entered halftime tied 10–10 after a Jordan Gowins touchdown run. Carbone ran it in himself to extend the Stony Brook lead to 17–10. However, with five minutes left to play, Albany quarterback Jeff Undercuffler threw an 81-yard touchdown pass to Donavan McDonald; a missed PAT whittled the lead to 17–16. Albany got the ball back and took back the lead with 1:45 remaining on a Karl Mofor 16-yard touchdown run; a failed two-point conversion meant the lead was only 22–16. On the ensuing kickoff, Donald Liotine fumbled the ball and Albany recovered, but Stony Brook used all three timeouts and Albany's Ethan Stark missed a field goal. With 17 seconds remaining, Carbone threw a Hail Mary pass that was caught by Julius Wingate for a touchdown, and the Seawolves took a 23–22 lead. However, an unsportsmanlike conduct penalty during the celebration pushed Stony Brook's kickoff back 15 yards. The ensuing squib kick was returned to the Stony Brook 42-yard line, and one pass play brought Albany to the 31. As time expired, Stark's 48-yard field goal bounced off the crossbar and in as Albany pulled off a stunning upset in the rivalry game.

== FCS Playoffs ==
=== Southeast Missouri State–First Round ===
	1	2	3	4	Total
No. 15 Seawolves	0	14	0	0	14
No. 20 Redhawks	0	0	28	0	28

== Ranking movements ==
Ranking movements Legend: ██ Increase in ranking ██ Decrease in ranking
	Week													
Poll	Pre	1	2	3	4	5	6	7	8	9	10	11	12	Final
STATS FCS	20	24	24	20	18	13	19	18	15	16	12	10	15	16
Coaches	22	23	21	19	17	13	20	17	15	18	15	10	16	18
