= 2018 Richmond Spiders football team =

American college football season

2018 Richmond Spiders football
- Conference: Colonial Athletic Association
- Record: 4–7 (2–6 CAA)
- Head coach: Russ Huesman (2nd season)
- Offensive coordinator: Jeff Durden (2nd season)
- Defensive coordinator: Adam Braithwaite (2nd season)
- Home stadium: E. Claiborne Robins Stadium

2018 Colonial Athletic Association football standings
	Conf.			Overall
Team	W		L	W		L
No. 4 Maine $^	7	–	1	10	–	4
No. 9 James Madison ^	6	–	2	9	–	4
No. 16 Stony Brook ^	5	–	3	7	–	5
No. 20 Towson ^	5	–	3	7	–	5
No. 24 Delaware ^	5	–	3	7	–	5
No. 19 Elon ^	4	–	3	6	–	5
Rhode Island	4	–	4	6	–	5
William & Mary	3	–	4	4	–	6
New Hampshire	3	–	5	4	–	7
Villanova	2	–	6	5	–	6
Richmond	2	–	6	4	–	7
Albany	1	–	7	3	–	8
$ – Conference champion; ^ – FCS playoff participant; Rankings from STATS Poll

The 2018 Richmond Spiders football team represented the University of Richmond in the 2018 NCAA Division I FCS football season. They were led by second-year head coach Russ Huesman and played their home games at E. Claiborne Robins Stadium. The Spiders were a member of the Colonial Athletic Association. They finished the season 4–7, 2–6 in CAA play to finish in a tie for tenth place.

== Preseason ==
=== CAA poll ===
In the CAA preseason poll released on July 24, 2018, the Spiders were predicted to finish in seventh place.

=== Preseason All-CAA Team ===
The Spiders had four players selected to the preseason all-CAA team.

Offense

Dejon Brissett – WR

John Yarbrough – OL

Defense

Andrew Clyde – DL

Special teams

Griffin Trau – K

=== Award watch lists ===
Award	Player	Position	Year
Buck Buchanan Award	Andrew Clyde	DT	SR

== Schedule ==
Date	Time	Opponent	Site	TV	Result	Attendance
September 1	6:00 p.m.	at Virginia*	Scott Stadium; Charlottesville, VA	ESPN3	L 13–42	40,524
September 8	6:00 p.m.	Fordham*	Robins Stadium; Richmond, VA	NBCS WA	W 52–7	8,057
September 13 (Note: Game was originally scheduled for September 15 in Richmond, but relocated due to Hurricane Florence.)	5:00 p.m.	at Saint Francis (PA)*	DeGol Field; Loretto, PA	NECFR	W 35–27	1,234
September 22	6:00 p.m.	at No. 20 Stony Brook	Kenneth P. LaValle Stadium; Stony Brook, NY	CBSI Digital/CBS SportsLive	L 10–36	6,272
September 29	3:00 p.m.	No. 2 James Madison	Robins Stadium; Richmond, VA (rivalry)	NBCS WA+	L 10–63	8,217
October 6	3:00 p.m.	Delaware	Robins Stadium; Richmond, VA	NBCS WA or NBCS WA+	L 28–43	8,217
October 13	7:00 p.m.	at Albany	Bob Ford Field at Tom & Mary Casey Stadium; Albany, NY	UAlbany Live Events	W 27–24	4,059
October 20	1:30 p.m.	at No. 11 Elon	Rhodes Stadium; Elon, NC	FCS/FSGO	L 28–38	5,982
November 3	3:00 p.m.	Villanova^{†}	Robins Stadium; Richmond, VA	NBCS WA or NBCS WA+	L 21–45	8,117
November 10	3:00 p.m.	No. 16 Maine	Robins Stadium; Richmond, VA	NBCS WA or NBCS WA+	L 9–28	7,820
November 17	2:00 p.m.	at William & Mary	Zable Stadium; Williamsburg, VA (Capital Cup)	Cox Yurview	W 10–6	9,739
*Non-conference game; ^{†}Homecoming; Rankings from STATS Poll released prior to the game; All times are in Eastern time

- Source: Schedule

== Game summaries ==
=== At Virginia ===
	1	2	3	4	Total
Spiders	10	0	3	0	13
Cavaliers	14	14	7	7	42

=== Fordham ===
	1	2	3	4	Total
Rams	0	0	0	7	7
Spiders	7	10	35	0	52

=== At Saint Francis (PA) ===
	1	2	3	4	Total
Spiders	2	7	3	23	35
Red Flash	0	3	17	7	27

=== At Stony Brook ===
	1	2	3	4	Total
Spiders	3	0	7	0	10
No. 20 Seawolves	9	7	6	14	36

=== James Madison ===
	1	2	3	4	Total
No. 2 Dukes	7	28	21	7	63
Spiders	3	7	0	0	10

=== Delaware ===
	1	2	3	4	Total
Fightin' Blue Hens	19	14	10	0	43
Spiders	7	3	6	12	28

=== At Albany ===
	1	2	3	4	Total
Spiders	7	10	7	3	27
Great Danes	7	7	7	3	24

=== At Elon ===
	1	2	3	4	Total
Spiders	7	7	7	7	28
No. 11 Phoenix	14	7	14	3	38

=== Villanova ===
	1	2	3	4	Total
Wildcats	7	13	18	7	45
Spiders	0	7	7	7	21

=== Maine ===
	1	2	3	4	Total
No. 16 Black Bears	14	7	7	0	28
Spiders	0	3	0	6	9

=== At William & Mary ===
	1	2	3	4	Total
Spiders	0	7	3	0	10
Tribe	0	0	0	6	6
