= 2018 Maine Black Bears football team =

American college football season

2018 Maine Black Bears football

CAA champion

FCS Playoffs Semifinals, L 19–50 vs. Eastern Washington
- Conference: Colonial Athletic Association

Ranking
- STATS: No. 4
- FCS Coaches: No. 5
- Record: 10–4 (7–1 CAA)
- Head coach: Joe Harasymiak (3rd season)
- Offensive coordinator: Nick Charlton (1st season)
- Defensive coordinator: Corey Hetherman (3rd season)
- Home stadium: Alfond Stadium

2018 Colonial Athletic Association football standings
| | Conf. | | | Overall |
| Team | W | | L | W | | L |
|---|---|---|---|---|---|---|
| No. 4 Maine $^ | 7 | – | 1 | 10 | – | 4 |
| No. 9 James Madison ^ | 6 | – | 2 | 9 | – | 4 |
| No. 16 Stony Brook ^ | 5 | – | 3 | 7 | – | 5 |
| No. 20 Towson ^ | 5 | – | 3 | 7 | – | 5 |
| No. 24 Delaware ^ | 5 | – | 3 | 7 | – | 5 |
| No. 19 Elon ^ | 4 | – | 3 | 6 | – | 5 |
| Rhode Island | 4 | – | 4 | 6 | – | 5 |
| William & Mary | 3 | – | 4 | 4 | – | 6 |
| New Hampshire | 3 | – | 5 | 4 | – | 7 |
| Villanova | 2 | – | 6 | 5 | – | 6 |
| Richmond | 2 | – | 6 | 4 | – | 7 |
| Albany | 1 | – | 7 | 3 | – | 8 |
$ – Conference champion; ^ – FCS playoff participant; Rankings from STATS Poll

The 2018 Maine Black Bears football team represented the University of Maine in the 2018 NCAA Division I FCS football season. They played their home games at Alfond Stadium. They were a member of the Colonial Athletic Association. They were led by third-year head coach Joe Harasymiak. They finished the season 10–4, 7–1 in CAA play to be crowned CAA champions. They received the CAA's automatic bid to the FCS Playoffs where, after a first round bye, they defeated Jacksonville State in the second round, and Weber State in the quarterfinals before losing in the semifinals to Eastern Washington.

== Preseason ==
=== CAA poll ===
In the CAA preseason poll released on July 24, 2018, the Black Bears were predicted to finish in eighth place.

=== Preseason All-CAA Team ===
The Black Bears had three players selected to the preseason all-CAA team.

Defense

Kayon Whitaker – DL

Special teams

Earnest Edwards – KR

Mozai Nelson – Specialist

== Schedule ==
| Date | Time | Opponent | Rank | Site | TV | Result | Attendance |
|---|---|---|---|---|---|---|---|
| August 30 | 7:00 p.m. | No. 7 New Hampshire | | Alfond Stadium; Orono, ME (Battle for the Brice–Cowell Musket) | FCS/FSGO | W 35–7 | 6,597 |
| September 8 | 7:30 p.m. | at Western Kentucky* | No. 22 | Houchens Industries–L. T. Smith Stadium; Bowling Green, KY | ESPN+ | W 31–28 | 15,178 |
| September 22 | 3:00 p.m. | at Central Michigan* | No. 13 | Kelly/Shorts Stadium; Mount Pleasant, MI | ESPN+ | L 5–17 | 16,474 |
| September 29 | 1:00 p.m. | at Yale* | No. 16 | Yale Bowl; New Haven, CT | ESPN+ | L 14–35 | 7,889 |
| October 6 | 3:30 p.m. | No. 19 Villanova | No. 25 | Alfond Stadium; Orono, ME | FCS/WVII/WIPL | W 13–10 | 6,894 |
| October 13 | 12:00 p.m. | at No. 16 Rhode Island | No. 21 | Meade Stadium; Kingston, RI | CAA.tv | W 38–36 | 7,301 |
| October 20 | 3:30 p.m. | at William & Mary | No. 16 | Zable Stadium; Williamsburg, VA | Cox Yurview | L 20–27 | 10,462 |
| October 27 | 1:00 p.m. | Albany^{†} | No. 24 | Alfond Stadium; Orono, ME | FCS/WVII/WIPL | W 28–9 | 9,248 |
| November 3 | 4:00 p.m. | at No. 15 Towson | No. 23 | Johnny Unitas Stadium; Towson, MD | CBSI Digital/CBS SportsLive | W 35–28 | 7,356 |
| November 10 | 3:00 p.m. | at Richmond | No. 16 | Robins Stadium; Richmond, VA | NBCS WA+ | W 28–9 | 7,820 |
| November 17 | 12:00 p.m. | No. 14 Elon | No. 16 | Alfond Stadium; Orono, ME | FCS/WVII/WIPL | W 27–26 | 6,584 |
| December 1 | 12:00 p.m. | No. 8 Jacksonville State | No. 12 | Alfond Stadium; Orono, ME (NCAA Division I Second Round) | ESPN3 | W 55–27 | 6,145 |
| December 7 | 8:00 p.m. | at No. 3 Weber State | No. 12 | Stewart Stadium; Ogden, UT (NCAA Division I Quarterfinal) | ESPN2 | W 23–18 | 7,726 |
| December 15 | 2:00 p.m. | at No. 4 Eastern Washington | No. 12 | Roos Field; Cheney, WA (NCAA Division I Semifinal) | ESPN2 | L 19–50 | 7,529 |
*Non-conference game; ^{†}Homecoming; Rankings from STATS Poll released prior to the game; All times are in Eastern time

== Game summaries ==
=== New Hampshire ===
| | 1 | 2 | 3 | 4 | Total |
|---|---|---|---|---|---|
| No. 7 Wildcats | 0 | 0 | 0 | 7 | 7 |
| Black Bears | 0 | 22 | 7 | 6 | 35 |

=== At Western Kentucky ===
| | 1 | 2 | 3 | 4 | Total |
|---|---|---|---|---|---|
| No. 22 Black Bears | 0 | 14 | 14 | 3 | 31 |
| Hilltoppers | 21 | 0 | 0 | 7 | 28 |

=== At Central Michigan ===
| | 1 | 2 | 3 | 4 | Total |
|---|---|---|---|---|---|
| No. 13 Black Bears | 0 | 0 | 3 | 2 | 5 |
| Chippewas | 0 | 10 | 0 | 7 | 17 |

=== At Yale ===
| | 1 | 2 | 3 | 4 | Total |
|---|---|---|---|---|---|
| No. 16 Black Bears | 0 | 0 | 7 | 7 | 14 |
| Bulldogs | 7 | 7 | 14 | 7 | 35 |

=== Villanova ===
| | 1 | 2 | 3 | 4 | Total |
|---|---|---|---|---|---|
| No. 19 Wildcats | 3 | 0 | 7 | 0 | 10 |
| No. 25 Black Bears | 0 | 3 | 7 | 3 | 13 |

=== At Rhode Island ===
| | 1 | 2 | 3 | 4 | Total |
|---|---|---|---|---|---|
| No. 21 Black Bears | 7 | 7 | 8 | 16 | 38 |
| No. 16 Rams | 10 | 6 | 14 | 6 | 36 |

=== At William & Mary ===
| | 1 | 2 | 3 | 4 | Total |
|---|---|---|---|---|---|
| No. 16 Black Bears | 10 | 7 | 0 | 3 | 20 |
| Tribe | 7 | 7 | 3 | 10 | 27 |

=== Albany ===
| | 1 | 2 | 3 | 4 | Total |
|---|---|---|---|---|---|
| Great Danes | 0 | 0 | 3 | 6 | 9 |
| No. 24 Black Bears | 14 | 7 | 0 | 7 | 28 |

=== At Towson ===
| | 1 | 2 | 3 | 4 | Total |
|---|---|---|---|---|---|
| No. 23 Black Bears | 7 | 14 | 7 | 7 | 35 |
| No. 15 Tigers | 0 | 7 | 14 | 7 | 28 |

=== At Richmond ===
| | 1 | 2 | 3 | 4 | Total |
|---|---|---|---|---|---|
| No. 16 Black Bears | 14 | 7 | 7 | 0 | 28 |
| Spiders | 0 | 3 | 0 | 6 | 9 |

=== Elon ===
| | 1 | 2 | 3 | 4 | Total |
|---|---|---|---|---|---|
| No. 14 Phoenix | 0 | 10 | 10 | 6 | 26 |
| No. 16 Black Bears | 0 | 14 | 13 | 0 | 27 |

== FCS Playoffs ==
Maine received a bye in the first round.
Box scores:

=== Jacksonville State–Second Round ===
| | 1 | 2 | 3 | 4 | Total |
|---|---|---|---|---|---|
| No. 8 Gamecocks | 7 | 7 | 10 | 3 | 27 |
| No. 12 Black Bears | 21 | 21 | 7 | 6 | 55 |

=== At Weber State–Quarterfinals ===
| | 1 | 2 | 3 | 4 | Total |
|---|---|---|---|---|---|
| No. 12 Black Bears | 0 | 7 | 7 | 9 | 23 |
| No. 3 Wildcats | 0 | 3 | 9 | 6 | 18 |

=== At Eastern Washington–Semifinals ===
| | 1 | 2 | 3 | 4 | Total |
|---|---|---|---|---|---|
| No. 12 Black Bears | 0 | 0 | 19 | 0 | 19 |
| No. 4 Eagles | 21 | 7 | 15 | 7 | 50 |

== Ranking movements ==
Ranking movements Legend: ██ Increase in ranking ██ Decrease in ranking — = Not ranked RV = Received votes
| | Week | | | | | | | | | | | | | |
| Poll | Pre | 1 | 2 | 3 | 4 | 5 | 6 | 7 | 8 | 9 | 10 | 11 | 12 | Final |
|---|---|---|---|---|---|---|---|---|---|---|---|---|---|---|
| STATS FCS | — | 22 | 17 | 13 | 16 | 25 | 21 | 16 | 24 | 23 | 16 | 16 | 12 | 4 |
| Coaches | — | 25 | 20 | 16 | 16 | 25 | 22 | 20 | RV | RV | 21 | 19 | 14 | 5 |
