= 2018 James Madison Dukes football team =

American college football season

2018 James Madison Dukes football

FCS Playoffs Second Round, L 20–23 vs. Colgate
- Conference: Colonial Athletic Association

Ranking
- STATS: No. 9
- FCS Coaches: No. 10
- Record: 9–4 (6–2 CAA)
- Head coach: Mike Houston (3rd season)
- Offensive coordinator: Donnie Kirkpatrick (3rd season)
- Defensive coordinator: Bob Trott (3rd season)
- Home stadium: Bridgeforth Stadium

2018 Colonial Athletic Association football standings
	Conf.			Overall
Team	W		L	W		L
No. 4 Maine $^	7	–	1	10	–	4
No. 9 James Madison ^	6	–	2	9	–	4
No. 16 Stony Brook ^	5	–	3	7	–	5
No. 20 Towson ^	5	–	3	7	–	5
No. 24 Delaware ^	5	–	3	7	–	5
No. 19 Elon ^	4	–	3	6	–	5
Rhode Island	4	–	4	6	–	5
William & Mary	3	–	4	4	–	6
New Hampshire	3	–	5	4	–	7
Villanova	2	–	6	5	–	6
Richmond	2	–	6	4	–	7
Albany	1	–	7	3	–	8
$ – Conference champion; ^ – FCS playoff participant; Rankings from STATS Poll

The 2018 James Madison Dukes football team represented James Madison University during the 2018 NCAA Division I FCS football season. They were led by third-year head coach Mike Houston and played their home games at Bridgeforth Stadium. They were a member of the Colonial Athletic Association (CAA). They finished the season 9–4, 6–2 in CAA play to finish in second place. They received an at-large bid to the FCS Playoffs where they defeated Delaware in the first round before losing to Colgate in the second round.

On December 7, 2018, Mike Houston was formally announced and hired as the next coach of East Carolina, alongside nine staff members.

== Preseason ==
=== CAA poll ===
In the CAA preseason poll released on July 24, 2018, the Dukes were predicted to win the CAA championship.

=== Preseason All-CAA Team ===
The Dukes had six players selected to the preseason all-CAA team, including cornerback Rashad Robinson being selected as preseason defensive player of the year.

Offense

Marcus Marshall – RB

Jahee Jackson – OL

Defense

Darrious Carter – DL

Jimmy Moreland – DB

Rashad Robinson – DB

Special teams

Harry O'Kelly – P

=== Award watch lists ===
Award	Player	Position	Year
Buck Buchanan Award	Rashad Robinson	CB	SR

== Schedule ==
Date	Time	Opponent	Rank	Site	TV	Result	Attendance
September 1	12:00 p.m.	at NC State*	No. 2	Carter–Finley Stadium; Raleigh, NC	ESPNU	L 13–24	56,073
September 8	6:00 p.m.	at Norfolk State*	No. 2	William "Dick" Price Stadium; Norfolk, VA	ESPN3	W 17–0 (Note: The JMU–Norfolk State game was mutually ended after first quarter due to inclement weather.)	6,482
September 13	7:30 p.m. (Note: Moved from Saturday at 6:00 p.m. in anticipation of Hurricane Florence.)	Robert Morris*	No. 2	Bridgeforth Stadium; Harrisonburg, VA	NBCS WA+	W 73–7	18,112
September 22	3:30 p.m.	William & Mary	No. 2	Bridgeforth Stadium; Harrisonburg, VA (rivalry)	NBCS WA+	W 51–0	25,130
September 29	3:00 p.m.	at Richmond	No. 2	E. Claiborne Robins Stadium; Richmond, VA (rivalry)	NBCS WA+	W 63–10	8,217
October 6	1:30 p.m.	No. 10 Elon	No. 2	Bridgeforth Stadium; Harrisonburg, VA	MASN/SNY	L 24–27	25,484
October 13	1:00 p.m.	at Villanova	No. 6	Villanova Stadium; Villanova, PA	FCS/FSGO	W 37–0	5,219
October 27	3:30 p.m.	No. 15 Stony Brook^{†}	No. 3	Bridgeforth Stadium; Harrisonburg, VA	MASN/SNY	W 13–10	25,244
November 3	1:00 p.m.	at New Hampshire	No. 3	Wildcat Stadium; Durham, NH	FCS	L 24–35	7,741
November 10	2:00 p.m.	Rhode Island	No. 9	Bridgeforth Stadium; Harrisonburg, VA	MASN/SNY	W 48–31	24,199
November 17	2:00 p.m	at No. 15 Towson	No. 7	Johnny Unitas Stadium; Towson, MD	CBSI Digital/CBS SportsLive	W 38–17	7,208
November 24	3:00 p.m.	No. 21 Delaware*	No. 6	Bridgeforth Stadium; Harrisonburg, VA (FCS Playoffs First Round/rivalry)	ESPN3	W 20–6	7,297
December 1	1:00 p.m.	at No. 9 Colgate*	No. 6	Crown Field at Andy Kerr Stadium; Hamilton, NY (FCS Playoffs Second Round)	ESPN3	L 20–23	6,418
*Non-conference game; ^{†}Homecoming; Rankings from STATS Poll released prior to the game; All times are in Eastern time

== Game summaries ==
=== At NC State ===
	1	2	3	4	Total
No. 2 Dukes	7	0	3	3	13
Wolfpack	0	17	0	7	24

=== At Norfolk State ===
	1	2	3	4	Total
No. 2 Dukes	17				17
Spartans	0				0

Due to inclement weather, the JMU–Norfolk State game was mutually ended after the first quarter.

=== Robert Morris ===
	1	2	3	4	Total
Colonials	0	0	0	7	7
No. 2 Dukes	21	31	14	7	73

=== William & Mary ===
	1	2	3	4	Total
Tribe	0	0	0	0	0
No. 2 Dukes	7	10	21	13	51

=== At Richmond ===
	1	2	3	4	Total
No. 2 Dukes	7	28	21	7	63
Spiders	3	7	0	0	10

=== Elon ===
	1	2	3	4	Total
No. 10 Phoenix	0	7	3	17	27
No. 2 Dukes	3	6	3	12	24

=== At Villanova ===
	1	2	3	4	Total
No. 6 Dukes	10	6	14	7	37
Wildcats	0	0	0	0	0

=== Stony Brook ===
	1	2	3	4	Total
No. 15 Seawolves	0	10	0	0	10
No. 3 Dukes	7	0	0	6	13

=== At New Hampshire ===
	1	2	3	4	Total
No. 3 Dukes	3	0	7	14	24
Wildcats	14	7	7	7	35

=== Rhode Island ===
	1	2	3	4	Total
Rams	7	7	10	7	31
No. 9 Dukes	14	13	7	14	48

=== At Towson ===
	1	2	3	4	Total
No. 7 Dukes	7	17	7	7	38
No. 15 Tigers	7	3	0	7	17

== FCS Playoffs ==
=== Delaware–First Round ===
	1	2	3	4	Total
No. 21 Fightin' Blue Hens	0	3	3	0	6
No. 6 Dukes	3	9	8	0	20

=== At Colgate–Second Round ===
	1	2	3	4	Total
No. 6 Dukes	7	3	3	7	20
No. 9 Raiders	3	3	14	3	23

== Ranking movements ==
Ranking movements Legend: ██ Increase in ranking ██ Decrease in ranking т = Tied with team above or below ( ) = First-place votes
	Week													
Poll	Pre	1	2	3	4	5	6	7	8	9	10	11	12	Final
STATS FCS	2 (6)	2 (1)	2 (2)	2 (2)	2 (3)	2 (3)	6–T	4	3	3	9	7	6	9
Coaches	2 (3)	2	2 (1)	2	2	2	8	5	3	3	10	8	6	10

== Players drafted into the NFL ==
Round	Pick	Player	Position	NFL Club
7	227	Jimmy Moreland	CB	Washington Redskins
