= 2018 Villanova Wildcats football team =

American college football season

2018 Villanova Wildcats football
- Conference: Colonial Athletic Association
- Record: 5–6 (2–6 CAA)
- Head coach: Mark Ferrante (2nd season)
- Offensive coordinator: Sam Venuto (20th season)
- Offensive scheme: Multiple spread
- Defensive coordinator: Joe Trainer (10th season)
- Base defense: 3–3–5
- Home stadium: Villanova Stadium

2018 Colonial Athletic Association football standings
	Conf.			Overall
Team	W		L	W		L
No. 4 Maine $^	7	–	1	10	–	4
No. 9 James Madison ^	6	–	2	9	–	4
No. 16 Stony Brook ^	5	–	3	7	–	5
No. 20 Towson ^	5	–	3	7	–	5
No. 24 Delaware ^	5	–	3	7	–	5
No. 19 Elon ^	4	–	3	6	–	5
Rhode Island	4	–	4	6	–	5
William & Mary	3	–	4	4	–	6
New Hampshire	3	–	5	4	–	7
Villanova	2	–	6	5	–	6
Richmond	2	–	6	4	–	7
Albany	1	–	7	3	–	8
$ – Conference champion; ^ – FCS playoff participant; Rankings from STATS Poll

The 2018 Villanova Wildcats football team represented Villanova University in the 2018 NCAA Division I FCS football season. They were led by second-year head coach Mark Ferrante and played their home games at Villanova Stadium. They were a member of the Colonial Athletic Association. They finished the season 5–6, 2–6 in CAA play to finish in a tie for tenth place.

== Preseason ==
=== CAA poll ===
In the CAA preseason poll released on July 24, 2018, the Wildcats were predicted to finish in sixth place.

=== Preseason All-CAA Team ===
The Wildcats had two players selected to the preseason all-CAA team including quarterback Trevor Knight being selected as offensive player of the year.

Offense

Ethan Greenidge – OL

Defense

Rob Rolle – S

== Schedule ==
Date	Time	Opponent	Rank	Site	TV	Result	Attendance
September 1	12:00 p.m.	at Temple*	No. 19	Lincoln Financial Field; Philadelphia, PA (Mayor's Cup)	ESPNews	W 19–17	32,357
September 8	12:30 p.m.	at Lehigh*	No. 12	Goodman Stadium; Bethlehem, PA	Stadium	W 31–9	5,104
September 15	3:30 p.m.	Towson	No. 10	Villanova Stadium; Villanova, PA	FCS/FSGO	L 35–45	5,719
September 22	6:00 p.m.	Bucknell*	No. 15	Villanova Stadium; Villanova, PA		W 49–7	9,341
September 29	6:00 p.m.	at No. 18 Stony Brook	No. 13	Kenneth P. LaValle Stadium; Stony Brook, NY	FCS/FSGO	L 27–29	7,720
October 6	3:30 p.m.	at No. 25 Maine	No. 19	Alfond Stadium; Orono, ME	FCS	L 10–13	6,894
October 13	1:00 p.m.	No. 6 James Madison		Villanova Stadium; Villanova, PA	FCS/FSGO	L 0–37	5,219
October 27	3:30 p.m.	New Hampshire^{†}		Villanova Stadium; Villanova, PA	CBSI Digital/CBS SportsLive	L 0–34	3,919
November 3	3:00 p.m.	at Richmond		E. Claiborne Robins Stadium; Richmond, VA	NBCS WA	W 45–21	8,117
November 10	1:00 p.m.	William & Mary		Villanova Stadium; Villanova, PA	FCS/FSGO	L 17–24	4,105
November 17	12:00 p.m.	at No. 17 Delaware		Delaware Stadium; Newark, DE (Battle of the Blue)	NBCS PHIL/SNY	W 42–21	18,752
*Non-conference game; ^{†}Homecoming; Rankings from STATS Poll released prior to the game; All times are in Eastern time

== Game summaries ==
=== At Temple ===
	1	2	3	4	Total
No. 19 Wildcats	13	0	0	6	19
Owls	3	7	7	0	17

=== At Lehigh ===
	1	2	3	4	Total
No. 12 Wildcats	7	13	11	0	31
Mountain Hawks	3	0	0	6	9

=== Towson ===
	1	2	3	4	Total
Tigers	21	14	7	3	45
No. 10 Wildcats	14	7	7	7	35

=== Bucknell ===
	1	2	3	4	Total
Bison	0	7	0	0	7
No. 15 Wildcats	28	14	0	7	49

=== At Stony Brook ===
	1	2	3	4	Total
No. 13 Wildcats	7	14	0	6	27
No. 18 Seawolves	0	6	17	6	29

=== At Maine ===
	1	2	3	4	Total
No. 19 Wildcats	3	0	7	0	10
No. 25 Black Bears	0	3	7	3	13

=== James Madison ===
	1	2	3	4	Total
No. 6 Dukes	6	10	14	7	37
Wildcats	0	0	0	0	0

=== New Hampshire ===
	1	2	3	4	Total
UNH Wildcats	10	14	7	3	34
Nova Wildcats	0	0	0	0	0

=== At Richmond ===
	1	2	3	4	Total
Wildcats	7	13	18	7	45
Spiders	0	7	7	7	21

=== William & Mary ===
	1	2	3	4	Total
Tribe	0	14	10	0	24
Wildcats	0	7	0	10	17

=== At Delaware ===
	1	2	3	4	Total
Wildcats	14	7	7	14	42
No. 17 Fightin' Blue Hens	7	0	14	0	21

== Ranking movements ==
Ranking movements Legend: ██ Increase in ranking ██ Decrease in ranking — = Not ranked RV = Received votes т = Tied with team above or below
	Week													
Poll	Pre	1	2	3	4	5	6	7	8	9	10	11	12	Final
STATS FCS	19	12	10	15	13–T	19	RV	—	—	—	—	—	—	
Coaches	19	11	10	14	14	19	25	RV	—	—	—	—	—	
