= 2018 Rhode Island Rams football team =

American college football season

2018 Rhode Island Rams football
- Conference: Colonial Athletic Association
- Record: 6–5 (4–4 CAA)
- Head coach: Jim Fleming (5th season)
- Offensive coordinator: Will Fleming (2nd season)
- Defensive coordinator: Pete Rekstis (5th season)
- Home stadium: Meade Stadium

2018 Colonial Athletic Association football standings
	Conf.			Overall
Team	W		L	W		L
No. 4 Maine $^	7	–	1	10	–	4
No. 9 James Madison ^	6	–	2	9	–	4
No. 16 Stony Brook ^	5	–	3	7	–	5
No. 20 Towson ^	5	–	3	7	–	5
No. 24 Delaware ^	5	–	3	7	–	5
No. 19 Elon ^	4	–	3	6	–	5
Rhode Island	4	–	4	6	–	5
William & Mary	3	–	4	4	–	6
New Hampshire	3	–	5	4	–	7
Villanova	2	–	6	5	–	6
Richmond	2	–	6	4	–	7
Albany	1	–	7	3	–	8
$ – Conference champion; ^ – FCS playoff participant; Rankings from STATS Poll

The 2018 Rhode Island Rams football team represented the University of Rhode Island in the 2018 NCAA Division I FCS football season. They were led by fifth-year head coach Jim Fleming and played their home games at Meade Stadium. They were a member of the Colonial Athletic Association. They finished the season 6–5, 4–4 in CAA play to finish in seventh place.

== Preseason ==
=== CAA poll ===
In the CAA preseason poll released on July 24, 2018, the Rams were predicted to finish in last place.

=== Preseason All-CAA Team ===
The Rams had two players selected to the preseason all-CAA team.

Offense

Aaron Parker – WR

Defense

Brandon Ginnetti – DL

== Schedule ==
Date	Time	Opponent	Rank	Site	TV	Result	Attendance
August 30	7:00 p.m.	at No. 15 Delaware		Delaware Stadium; Newark, DE	CBSI Digital/CBS SportsLive	W 21–19	17,945
September 8	1:00 p.m.	Albany		Meade Stadium; Kingston, RI	FCS/FSGO	W 45–26	6,520
September 15	12:00 p.m.	at UConn*	No. 25	Rentschler Field; East Hartford, CT (rivalry)	SNY/ESPN3	L 49–56	20,691
September 28	7:00 p.m.	at Harvard*	No. 22	Harvard Stadium; Boston, MA	ESPN+	W 23–16	9,123
October 6	1:00 p.m.	Brown*	No. 18	Meade Stadium; Kingston, RI (Governor's Cup)	CAA.tv	W 48–0	6,141
October 13	12:00 p.m.	No. 21 Maine^{†}	No. 16	Meade Stadium; Kingston, RI	CAA.tv	L 36–38	7,301
October 20	6:00 p.m.	at No. 18 Stony Brook	No. 22	Kenneth P. LaValle Stadium; Stony Brook, NY		L 14–52	12,701
October 27	12:00 p.m.	William & Mary		Meade Stadium; Kingston, RI	CAA.tv	W 21–10	1,688
November 3	1:00 p.m.	at No. 8 Elon		Rhodes Stadium; Elon, NC		L 21–24	10,513
November 10	2:00 p.m.	at No. 9 James Madison		Bridgeforth Stadium; Harrisonburg, VA	MASN/SNY	L 31–48	24,199
November 17	12:00 p.m.	New Hampshire		Meade Stadium; Kingston, RI	CAA.tv	W 24–21	3,012
*Non-conference game; ^{†}Homecoming; Rankings from STATS Poll released prior to the game; All times are in Eastern time

== Game summaries ==
=== At Delaware ===
	1	2	3	4	Total
Rams	0	7	14	0	21
No. 15 Fightin' Blue Hens	0	10	3	6	19

=== Albany ===
	1	2	3	4	Total
Great Danes	7	0	0	19	26
Rams	14	17	14	0	45

=== At UConn ===
	1	2	3	4	Total
No. 25 Rams	7	21	14	7	49
Huskies	14	28	7	7	56

=== At Harvard ===
	1	2	3	4	Total
No. 22 Rams	2	14	7	0	23
Crimson	3	0	6	7	16

=== Brown ===
	1	2	3	4	Total
Bears	0	0	0	0	0
No. 18 Rams	3	24	14	7	48

=== Maine ===
	1	2	3	4	Total
No. 21 Black Bears	7	7	8	16	38
No. 16 Rams	10	6	14	6	36

=== At Stony Brook ===
	1	2	3	4	Total
No. 22 Rams	0	7	0	7	14
No. 18 Seawolves	10	14	14	14	52

=== William & Mary ===
	1	2	3	4	Total
Tribe	7	0	3	0	10
Rams	14	0	7	0	21

=== At Elon ===
	1	2	3	4	Total
Rams	7	0	0	14	21
No. 8 Phoenix	0	21	0	3	24

=== At James Madison ===
	1	2	3	4	Total
Rams	7	7	10	7	31
No. 9 Dukes	14	13	7	14	48

=== New Hampshire ===
	1	2	3	4	Total
Wildcats	0	0	7	14	21
Rams	3	7	7	7	24

== Ranking movements ==
Ranking movements Legend: ██ Increase in ranking ██ Decrease in ranking — = Not ranked RV = Received votes
	Week													
Poll	Pre	1	2	3	4	5	6	7	8	9	10	11	12	Final
STATS FCS	—	RV	25	23	22	18	16	22	RV	RV	RV	RV	RV	
Coaches	—	RV	RV	23	20	17	15	23	RV	RV	RV	RV	RV	
