= 2018 Elon Phoenix football team =

American college football season

2018 Elon Phoenix football

NCAA Division I First Round, L 7–19 vs. Wofford
- Conference: Colonial Athletic Association

Ranking
- STATS: No. 19
- FCS Coaches: No. 19
- Record: 6–5 (4–3 CAA)
- Head coach: Curt Cignetti (2nd season)
- Offensive coordinator: Drew Folmar (2nd season)
- Defensive coordinator: Tony Trisciani (2nd season)
- Home stadium: Rhodes Stadium

2018 Colonial Athletic Association football standings
	Conf.			Overall
Team	W		L	W		L
No. 4 Maine $^	7	–	1	10	–	4
No. 9 James Madison ^	6	–	2	9	–	4
No. 16 Stony Brook ^	5	–	3	7	–	5
No. 20 Towson ^	5	–	3	7	–	5
No. 24 Delaware ^	5	–	3	7	–	5
No. 19 Elon ^	4	–	3	6	–	5
Rhode Island	4	–	4	6	–	5
William & Mary	3	–	4	4	–	6
New Hampshire	3	–	5	4	–	7
Villanova	2	–	6	5	–	6
Richmond	2	–	6	4	–	7
Albany	1	–	7	3	–	8
$ – Conference champion; ^ – FCS playoff participant; Rankings from STATS Poll

The 2018 Elon Phoenix football team represented Elon University in the 2018 NCAA Division I FCS football season. They were led by second-year head coach Curt Cignetti and played their home games at Rhodes Stadium. They were members of the Colonial Athletic Association (CAA). They finished the season 6–5, 4–3 in CAA play to finish in sixth place. They received an at-large bid to the FCS Playoffs where they were lost to Wofford in the first round.

On December 14, head coach Curt Cignetti resigned to become the head coach at James Madison. He finished at Elon with a two-year record of 14–9.

== Preseason ==
=== CAA Poll ===
In the CAA preseason poll released on July 24, 2018, the Phoenix were predicted to finish in fifth place.

=== Preseason All-CAA Team ===
The Phoenix had two players selected to the preseason all-CAA team.

Offense

CJ Toogood – OL

Defense

Warren Messer – LB

=== Award watch lists ===
Award	Player	Position	Year
Buck Buchanan Award	Warren Messer	LB	SR

== Schedule ==
Date	Time	Opponent	Rank	Site	TV	Result	Attendance
September 1	6:00 p.m.	at South Florida*	No. 12	Raymond James Stadium; Tampa, FL	ESPN3	L 14–34	31,217
September 8	6:00 p.m.	No. 25 Furman*	No. 15	Rhodes Stadium; Elon, NC	CBSI Digital/CBS SportsLive	W 45–7	8,058
~~September 15~~	~~6:00 p.m.~~	at ~~William & Mary~~	No. 14	~~Zable Stadium~~; ~~Williamsburg, VA~~		Canceled (Note: The William & Mary game was postponed due to Hurricane Florence; it was intended to be rescheduled, but was canceled on September 19, 2018.)	
September 22	6:00 p.m.	at Charleston Southern*	No. 12	Buccaneer Field; North Charleston, SC	ESPN+	W 31–22	2,465
September 29	1:30 p.m.	New Hampshire	No. 11	Rhodes Stadium; Elon, NC	PAA	W 30–9	10,856
October 6	1:30 p.m.	at No. 2 James Madison	No. 10	Bridgeforth Stadium; Harrisonburg, VA	MASN/SNY	W 27–24	25,484
October 13	3:30 p.m.	at Delaware	No. 5	Delaware Stadium; Newark, DE	NBCS PHIL	L 16–28	19,209
October 20	1:30 p.m.	Richmond	No. 11	Rhodes Stadium; Elon, NC	FCS/FSGO	W 38–28	5,982
November 3	1:30 p.m.	Rhode Island^{†}	No. 8	Rhodes Stadium; Elon, NC	PAA	W 24–21	10,513
November 10	12:00 p.m.	No. 20 Towson	No. 7	Rhodes Stadium; Elon, NC	PAA	L 10–41	5,927
November 17	12:00 p.m.	at No. 16 Maine	No. 14	Alfond Stadium; Orono, ME	FCS	L 26–27	6,584
November 24	2:00 p.m.	at No. 13 Wofford*	No. 17	Gibbs Stadium; Spartanburg, SC (FCS Playoffs First Round)	ESPN3	L 7–19	2,157
*Non-conference game; ^{†}Homecoming; Rankings from STATS Poll released prior to the game; All times are in Eastern time

== Game summaries ==
=== At South Florida ===
	1	2	3	4	Total
No. 12 Phoenix	0	0	7	7	14
Bulls	7	17	7	3	34

=== Furman ===
	1	2	3	4	Total
No. 25 Paladins	0	0	0	7	7
No. 15 Phoenix	14	14	10	7	45

=== At Charleston Southern ===
	1	2	3	4	Total
No. 12 Phoenix	3	7	21	0	31
Buccaneers	13	6	3	0	22

=== New Hampshire ===
	1	2	3	4	Total
Wildcats	3	6	0	0	9
No. 11 Phoenix	7	17	3	3	30

=== At James Madison ===
	1	2	3	4	Total
No. 10 Phoenix	0	7	3	17	27
No. 2 Dukes	3	6	3	12	24

=== At Delaware ===
	1	2	3	4	Total
No. 5 Phoenix	7	3	6	0	16
Fightin' Blue Hens	0	7	7	14	28

=== Richmond ===
	1	2	3	4	Total
Spiders	7	7	7	7	28
No. 11 Phoenix	14	7	14	3	38

=== Rhode Island ===
	1	2	3	4	Total
Rams	7	0	0	14	21
No. 8 Phoenix	0	21	0	3	24

=== Towson ===
	1	2	3	4	Total
No. 20 Tigers	7	7	10	17	41
No. 7 Phoenix	0	3	7	0	10

=== At Maine ===
	1	2	3	4	Total
No. 14 Phoenix	0	10	10	6	26
No. 16 Black Bears	0	13	14	0	27

== FCS Playoffs ==
=== At Wofford–First Round ===
	1	2	3	4	Total
No. 17 Phoenix	0	7	0	0	7
No. 13 Terriers	3	3	10	3	19

== Ranking movements ==
Ranking movements Legend: ██ Increase in ranking ██ Decrease in ranking
	Week													
Poll	Pre	1	2	3	4	5	6	7	8	9	10	11	12	Final
STATS FCS	12	15	14	12	11	10	5	11	8	8	7	14	17	19
Coaches	13	15	14	12	9	9	6	11	6	6	5	12	17	19

== Players drafted into the NFL ==
Round	Pick	Player	Position	NFL Club
6	193	Olisaemeka Udoh	OT	Minnesota Vikings
