= 2018 New Hampshire Wildcats football team =

American college football season

2018 New Hampshire Wildcats football
- Conference: Colonial Athletic Association
- Record: 4–7 (3–5 CAA)
- Head coach: Sean McDonnell (20th season)
- Defensive coordinator: John Lyons (7th season)
- Home stadium: Wildcat Stadium

2018 Colonial Athletic Association football standings
	Conf.			Overall
Team	W		L	W		L
No. 4 Maine $^	7	–	1	10	–	4
No. 9 James Madison ^	6	–	2	9	–	4
No. 16 Stony Brook ^	5	–	3	7	–	5
No. 20 Towson ^	5	–	3	7	–	5
No. 24 Delaware ^	5	–	3	7	–	5
No. 19 Elon ^	4	–	3	6	–	5
Rhode Island	4	–	4	6	–	5
William & Mary	3	–	4	4	–	6
New Hampshire	3	–	5	4	–	7
Villanova	2	–	6	5	–	6
Richmond	2	–	6	4	–	7
Albany	1	–	7	3	–	8
$ – Conference champion; ^ – FCS playoff participant; Rankings from STATS Poll

The 2018 New Hampshire Wildcats football team represented the University of New Hampshire in the 2018 NCAA Division I FCS football season. They were led by 20th-year head coach Sean McDonnell and played their home games at Wildcat Stadium. They were a member of the Colonial Athletic Association. They finished the season 4–7, 3–5 in CAA play to finish in ninth place.

== Preseason ==
=== CAA poll ===
In the CAA preseason poll released on July 24, 2018, the Wildcats were predicted to finish in second place.

=== Preseason All-CAA Team ===
The Wildcats had three players selected to the preseason all-CAA team including quarterback Trevor Knight being selected as offensive player of the year.

Offense

Trevor Knight – QB

Neil O'Connor – WR

Defense

Quinlen Dean – LB

=== Award watch lists ===
Award	Player	Position	Year
Walter Payton Award	Neil O'Connor	WR	SR

== Schedule ==
Date	Time	Opponent	Rank	Site	TV	Result	Attendance
August 30	7:00 p.m.	at Maine	No. 7	Alfond Stadium; Orono, ME (Battle for the Brice–Cowell Musket)	FCS/FSGO	L 7–35	6,597
September 8	6:00 p.m.	Colgate*	No. 20	Wildcat Stadium; Durham, NH	NBCS BOS	L 3–10	11,433
September 15	5:00 p.m.	at Colorado*		Folsom Field; Boulder, CO	P12N	L 14–45	42,360
September 29	1:30 p.m.	at No. 11 Elon		Rhodes Stadium; Elon, NC	PAA	L 9–30	10,856
October 6	1:00 p.m.	Holy Cross*		Wildcat Stadium; Durham, NH	NBCS BOS	W 28–0	6,497
October 13	3:30 p.m.	Stony Brook^{†}		Wildcat Stadium; Durham, NH	CBSI/CBS SportsLive; NBCS BOS	L 7–35	17,687
October 20	3:30 p.m.	No. 24 Delaware		Wildcat Stadium; Durham, NH	CBSI/CBS SportsLive; NBCS BOS	L 14–38	11,992
October 27	3:30 p.m.	at Villanova		Villanova Stadium; Villanova, PA	CBSI/CBS SportsLive	W 34–0	3,919
November 3	1:00 p.m.	No. 3 James Madison		Wildcat Stadium; Durham, NH	FCS/FSGO	W 35–24	7,741
November 10	1:00 p.m.	Albany		Wildcat Stadium; Durham, NH	NBCS BOS	W 24–10	5,571
November 17	12:00 p.m.	at Rhode Island		Meade Stadium; Kingston, RI	CAA.tv	L 21–24	3,012
*Non-conference game; ^{†}Homecoming; Rankings from STATS Poll released prior to the game; All times are in Eastern time

== Game summaries ==
=== At Maine ===
	1	2	3	4	Total
No. 7 Wildcats	0	0	0	7	7
Black Bears	0	22	7	6	35

=== Colgate ===
	1	2	3	4	Total
Raiders	0	10	0	0	10
No. 20 Wildcats	0	3	0	0	3

=== At Colorado ===
	1	2	3	4	Total
Wildcats	0	0	14	0	14
Buffaloes	7	21	10	7	45

=== At Elon ===
	1	2	3	4	Total
Wildcats	3	6	0	0	9
No. 11 Phoenix	7	17	3	3	30

=== Holy Cross ===
	1	2	3	4	Total
Crusaders	0	0	0	0	0
Wildcats	14	0	14	0	28

=== Stony Brook ===
	1	2	3	4	Total
Seawolves	14	7	7	7	35
Wildcats	0	7	0	0	7

=== Delaware ===
	1	2	3	4	Total
No. 24 Fightin' Blue Hens	10	7	14	7	38
Wildcats	0	7	0	7	14

=== At Villanova ===
	1	2	3	4	Total
UNH Wildcats	10	14	7	3	34
Nova Wildcats	0	0	0	0	0

=== James Madison ===
	1	2	3	4	Total
No. 3 Dukes	3	0	7	14	24
Wildcats	14	7	7	7	35

=== Albany ===
	1	2	3	4	Total
Great Danes	3	0	0	7	10
Wildcats	7	3	7	7	24

=== At Rhode Island ===
	1	2	3	4	Total
Wildcats	0	0	7	14	21
Rams	3	7	7	7	24

== Ranking movements ==
Ranking movements Legend: ██ Increase in ranking ██ Decrease in ranking — = Not ranked RV = Received votes
	Week													
Poll	Pre	1	2	3	4	5	6	7	8	9	10	11	12	Final
STATS FCS	7	20	RV	RV	—	—	—	—	—	—	—	—	—	
Coaches	9	22	RV	—	—	—	—	—	—	—	—	—	—	
