= 2018 Colonial Athletic Association football season =

2018 CAA football season
- League: NCAA Division I Football Championship
- Sport: Football
- Duration: August 30, 2018 – November 17, 2018
- Teams: 12

CAA football seasons
- ← 2017 2019 →

2018 Colonial Athletic Association football standings
	Conf.			Overall
Team	W		L	W		L
No. 4 Maine $^	7	–	1	10	–	4
No. 9 James Madison ^	6	–	2	9	–	4
No. 16 Stony Brook ^	5	–	3	7	–	5
No. 20 Towson ^	5	–	3	7	–	5
No. 24 Delaware ^	5	–	3	7	–	5
No. 19 Elon ^	4	–	3	6	–	5
Rhode Island	4	–	4	6	–	5
William & Mary	3	–	4	4	–	6
New Hampshire	3	–	5	4	–	7
Villanova	2	–	6	5	–	6
Richmond	2	–	6	4	–	7
Albany	1	–	7	3	–	8
$ – Conference champion; ^ – FCS playoff participant; Rankings from STATS Poll

The 2018 Colonial Athletic Association football season was the twelfth season of football for the Colonial Athletic Association (CAA) and part of the 2018 NCAA Division I FCS football season.

== Head coaches ==
Team	Coach	Season	Overall Record	Record at School	CAA Record
Albany	Greg Gattuso	5th	118–56 (.678)	21–24 (.467)	11–21 (.344)
Delaware	Danny Rocco	2nd	97–46 (.678)	7–4 (.636)	31–17 (.646)
Elon	Curt Cignetti	2nd	61–20 (.753)	8–3 (.727)	6–2 (.750)
James Madison	Mike Houston	3rd	68–20 (.773)	25–1 (.962)	16–0 (1.000)
Maine	Joe Harasymiak	3rd	10–11 (.476)	10–11 (.476)	8–8 (.500)
New Hampshire	Sean McDonnell	20th	148–87 (.630)	148–87 (.630)	95–60 (.613)
Rhode Island	Jim Fleming	5th	28–39 (.418)	7–38 (.156)	5–27 (.156)
Richmond	Russ Huesman	2nd	65–42 (.607)	6–5 (.545)	4–4 (.500)
Stony Brook	Chuck Priore	13th	115–69 (.625)	76–60 (.559)	21–19 (.525)
Towson	Rob Ambrose	10th	55–61 (.474)	52–54 (.491)	35–39 (.473)
Villanova	Mark Ferrante	2nd	5–6 (.455)	5–6 (.455)	3–5 (.375)
William & Mary	Jimmye Laycock	39th	245–189–2 (.564)	245–189–2 (.564)	109–93 (.540)

Records are as of November 18, 2017

== Rankings ==
Legend
	Increase in ranking
	Decrease in ranking
	Not ranked previous week
RV	Receiving votes

		Pre	Wk 1	Wk 2	Wk 3	Wk 4	Wk 5	Wk 6	Wk 7	Wk 8	Wk 9	Wk 10	Wk 11	Wk 12	Final
Albany	S														
Albany	C														
Delaware	S	15	RV	RV	RV	RV	RV	RV	24	21	13	11	17	21	24
Delaware	C	16	RV	RV	RV	RV	RV	RV	25	21	16	12	18	23	23
Elon	S	12	15	14	12	11	10	5	11	8	8	7	14	17	19
Elon	C	13	15	14	12	9	9	6	11	6	6	5	12	17	19
James Madison	S	2	2	2	2	2	2	6	4	3	3	9	7	6	9
James Madison	C	2	2	2	2	2	2	8	5	3	3	10	8	6	10
Maine	S		22	17	13	16	25	21	16	24	23	16	16	12	4
Maine	C		25	20	16	16	25	22	20	RV	RV	21	19	14	5
New Hampshire	S	7	20	RV	RV										
New Hampshire	C	9	22	RV											
Rhode Island	S		RV	25	23	22	18	16	22	RV	RV	RV	RV	RV	RV
Rhode Island	C		RV	RV	23	20	17	15	23	RV	RV	RV	RV	RV	RV
Richmond	S	RV	RV	RV	RV	RV									
Richmond	C	RV			RV										
Stony Brook	S	20	24	24	20	18	13	19	18	15	16	12	10	15	16
Stony Brook	C	22	23	21	20	17	13	20	17	15	18	15	10	16	18
Towson	S				RV	RV	25	23	17	10	15	20	15	16	20
Towson	C				RV	RV	RV	24	18	10	15	20	16	19	22
Villanova	S	19	12	10	15	13	19	RV							
Villanova	C	19	11	10	14	14	19	25	RV						
William & Mary	S														
William & Mary	C														

== Regular season ==
Index to colors and formatting
CAA member won
CAA member lost
CAA teams in **bold**

All times Eastern time.

Rankings reflect that of the STATS FCS poll for that week.

=== Week 1 ===
Date	Time	Visiting team	Home team	Site	Result	Attendance	Reference
August 30	7:00 p.m.	No. 7 New Hampshire	**Maine**	Alfond Stadium • Orono, ME	**MAINE** 35–7	6,597	
August 30	7:00 p.m.	Rhode Island	**No. 15 Delaware**	Delaware Stadium • Newark, DE	**URI** 21–19	17,945	
September 1	12:00 p.m.	No. 2 James Madison	NC State	Carter–Finley Stadium • Raleigh, NC	**L** 13–24	56,073	
September 1	12:00 p.m.	No. 19 Villanova	Temple	Lincoln Financial Field • Philadelphia, PA	**W** 19–17	32,357	
September 1	2:00 p.m.	No. 20 Stony Brook	Air Force	Falcon Stadium • Colorado Springs, CO	**L** 0–38	33,415	
September 1	3:30 p.m.	Albany	Pittsburgh	Heinz Field • Pittsburgh, PA	**L** 7–33	34,486	
September 1	6:00 p.m.	No. 12 Elon	South Florida	Raymond James Stadium • Tampa, FL	**L** 14–34	31,217	
September 1	6:00 p.m.	Richmond	Virginia	Scott Stadium • Charlottesville, VA	**L** 13–42	40,524	
September 1	6:00 p.m.	William & Mary	Bucknell	Christy Mathewson–Memorial Stadium • Lewisburg, PA	**W** 14–7	5,042	
September 1	7:00 p.m.	Towson	Morgan State	Hughes Stadium • Baltimore, MD	**W** 36–10	9,209	

Players of the week:

Offensive		Defensive		Freshman		Special teams	
Player	Team	Player	Team	Player	Team	Player	Team
Zach Bednarczyk	Villanova	Justan Hogan; Sterling Sheffield	Rhode Island; Maine	Dev Holmes	Albany	Aidan O'Neill	Towson

=== Week 2 ===
Date	Time	Visiting team	Home team	Site	Result	Attendance	Reference
September 8	12:00 p.m.	**Towson**	Wake Forest	BB&T Field • Winston-Salem, NC	**L** 20–51	23,619	
September 8	12:30 p.m.	**No. 12 Villanova**	Lehigh	Goodman Stadium • Bethlehem, PA	**W** 31–9		
September 8	1:00 p.m.	**Albany**	**Rhode Island**	Meade Stadium • Kingston, RI	**URI** 45–26	6,520	
September 8	2:00 p.m.	**William & Mary**	No. 12 (FBS) Virginia Tech	Lane Stadium • Blacksburg, VA	**L** 17–62	65,632	
September 8	3:30 p.m.	Lafayette	**Delaware**	Delaware Stadium • Newark, DE	**W** 37–0	12,781	
September 8	6:00 p.m.	No. 25 Furman	**No. 15 Elon**	Rhodes Stadium • Elon, NC	**W** 45–7	8,058	
September 8	6:00 p.m.	**No. 2 James Madison**	Norfolk State	William "Dick" Price Stadium • Norfolk, VA	**W** 17–0	6,482	
September 8	6:00 p.m.	Colgate	**No. 20 New Hampshire**	Wildcat Stadium • Durham, NH	**L** 3–10	11,433	
September 8	6:00 p.m.	Fordham	**Richmond**	E. Claiborne Robins Stadium • Richmond, VA	**W** 52–7	8,057	
September 8	6:00 p.m.	Bryant	**No. 24 Stony Brook**	Kenneth P. LaValle Stadium • Stony Brook, NY	**W** 50–21	5,708	
September 8	7:30 p.m.	**No. 22 Maine**	Western Kentucky	Houchens Industries–L. T. Smith Stadium • Bowling Green, KY	**W** 31–28	15,718	

Players of the week:

Offensive		Defensive		Freshman		Special teams	
Player	Team	Player	Team	Player	Team	Player	Team
JaJuan Lawson	Rhode Island	McAllister Ingram	Elon	Ramon Jefferson	Maine	D'Angelo Amos	James Madison

=== Week 3 ===
Date	Time	Visiting team	Home team	Site	Result	Attendance	Reference
September 13	5:00 p.m.	**Richmond**	St. Francis	DeGol Field • Loretto, PA	**W** 35–27	1,234	
September 13	7:30 p.m.	Robert Morris	**No. 2 James Madison**	Bridgeforth Stadium • Harrisonburg, VA	**W** 73–7	18,112	
September 15	12:00 p.m.	**No. 25 Rhode Island**	Connecticut	Rentschler Field • East Hartford, CT	**L** 49–56	20,691	
September 15	3:30 p.m.	**Towson**	**No. 10 Villanova**	Villanova Stadium • Villanova, PA	**TOW** 45–35	5,719	
September 15	3:30 p.m.	Cornell	**Delaware**	Delaware Stadium • Newark, DE	**W** 27–10	14,511	
September 15	5:00 p.m.	**New Hampshire**	Colorado	Folsom Field • Boulder, CO	**L** 14–45	42,360	
~~September 15~~	~~6:00 p.m.~~	~~**No. 14 Elon**~~	~~**William & Mary**~~	~~Zable Stadium • Williamsburg, VA~~	**Cancelled**		
September 15	6:00 p.m.	**No. 24 Stony Brook**	Fordham	Coffey Field • Bronx, NY	**W** 28–6	6,524	
September 15	7:00 p.m.	Morgan State	**Albany**	Bob Ford Field • Albany, NY	**W** 30–27	6,503	

Players of the week:

Offensive		Defensive		Freshman		Special teams	
Player	Team	Player	Team	Player	Team	Player	Team
Tom Flacco; JaJuan Lawson	Towson; Rhode Island	Shayne Lawless	Stony Brook	Dev Holmes	Albany	Dejon Brissett	Richmond

=== Week 4 ===
Date	Time	Visiting team	Home team	Site	Result	Attendance	Reference
September 22	2:00 p.m.	**Delaware**	No. 1 North Dakota State	Fargodome • Fargo, ND	**L** 10–38	18,883	
September 22	3:00 p.m.	**No. 13 Maine**	Central Michigan	Kelly/Shorts Stadium • Mount Pleasant, MI	**L** 5–17	16,474	
September 22	3:30 p.m.	**William & Mary**	**No. 2 James Madison**	Bridgeforth Stadium • Harrisonburg, VA	**JMU** 51–0	25,130	
September 22	6:00 p.m.	**Richmond**	**No. 20 Stony Brook**	Kenneth P. LaValle Stadium • Stony Brook, NY	**SBU** 36–10	6,272	
September 22	6:00 p.m.	**No. 12 Elon**	Charleston Southern	Buccaneer Field • North Charleston, SC	**W** 31–22	2,465	
September 22	6:00 p.m.	Bucknell	**No. 15 Villanova**	Villanova Stadium • Villanova, PA	**W** 49–7	9,341	
September 22	7:00 p.m.	St. Francis	**Albany**	Bob Ford Field • Albany, NY	**W** 35–28	3,840	

Players of the week:

Offensive		Defensive		Freshman		Special teams	
Player	Team	Player	Team	Player	Team	Player	Team
Jordan Gowans	Stony Brook	Jimmy Moreland	James Madison	Dev Holmes	Albany	Casey Williams	Stony Brook

=== Week 5 ===
Date	Time	Visiting team	Home team	Site	Result	Attendance	Reference
September 28	7:00 p.m.	**No. 22 Rhode Island**	Harvard	Harvard Stadium • Boston, MA	**W** 23–16	9,123	
September 29	1:00 p.m.	**No. 16 Maine**	Yale	Yale Bowl • New Haven, CT	**L** 14–35	7,889	
September 29	1:30 p.m.	**New Hampshire**	**No. 11 Elon**	Rhodes Stadium • Elon, NC	**ELON** 30–9	10,856	
September 29	3:00 p.m.	**No. 2 James Madison**	**Richmond**	E. Claiborne Robins Stadium • Richmond, VA	**JMU** 63–10	8,217	
September 29	4:00 p.m.	The Citadel	**No. 25 Towson**	Johnny Unitas Stadium • Towson, MD	**W** 44–27	7,323	
September 29	6:00 p.m.	**No. 13 Villanova**	**No. 18 Stony Brook**	Kenneth P. LaValle Stadium • Stony Brook, NY	**SBU** 29–27	7,720	
September 29	6:00 p.m.	No. 24 Colgate	**William & Mary**	Zable Stadium • Williamsburg, VA	**L** 0–23	9,191	

Players of the week:

Offensive		Defensive		Freshman		Special teams	
Player	Team	Player	Team	Player	Team	Player	Team
Tom Flacco	Towson	Marcus Willoughby	Elon	Kyndel Dean	James Madison	Ahmere Dorsey	Rhode Island

=== Week 6 ===
Date	Time	Visiting team	Home team	Site	Result	Attendance	Reference
October 6	12:00 p.m.	Holy Cross	New Hampshire	Wildcat Stadium • Durham, NH	**W** 28–0	6,497	
October 6	1:00 p.m.	Brown	No. 18 Rhode Island	Meade Stadium • Kingston, RI	**W** 48–0	6,141	
October 6	1:30 p.m.	**No. 10 Elon**	No. 2 James Madison	Bridgeforth Stadium • Harrisonburg, VA	**ELON** 27–24	25,484	
October 6	3:00 p.m.	**Delaware**	Richmond	E. Claiborne Robins Stadium • Richmond, VA	**DEL** 43–28	8,217	
October 6	3:30 p.m.	**Albany**	William & Mary	Zable Stadium • Williamsburg, VA	**W&M** 25–22	7,530	
October 6	3:30 p.m.	**No. 19 Villanova**	No. 25 Maine	Alfond Stadium • Orono, ME	**MAINE** 13–10	6,894	
October 6	4:00 p.m.	**No. 13 Stony Brook**	No. 23 Towson	Johnny Unitas Stadium • Towson, MD	**TOW** 52–28	4,614	

Players of the week:

Offensive		Defensive		Freshman		Special teams	
Player	Team	Player	Team	Player	Team	Player	Team
Malcolm Summers	Elon	Deshawn Stevens	Maine	Zack Monson	Elon	Kenny Doak; Shane Simpson	Maine; Towson

=== Week 7 ===
Date	Time	Visiting team	Home team	Site	Result	Attendance	Reference
October 13	12:00 p.m.	No. 21 Maine	No. 16 Rhode Island	Meade Stadium • Kingston, RI	**MAINE** 38–36	7,301	
October 13	1:00 p.m.	No. 6 James Madison	Villanova	Villanova Stadium • Villanova, PA	**JMU** 37–0	5,219	
October 13	3:30 p.m.	No. 5 Elon	Delaware	Delaware Stadium • Newark, DE	**DEL** 28–16	19,209	
October 13	3:30 p.m.	No. 19 Stony Brook	New Hampshire	Wildcat Stadium • Durham, NH	**SBU** 35–7	17,687	
October 13	4:00 p.m.	William & Mary	No. 17 Towson	Johnny Unitas Stadium • Towson, MD	**TOW** 29–13	8,002	
October 13	7:00 p.m.	Richmond	Albany	Bob Ford Field • Albany, NY	**RICH** 27–24	4,059	

Players of the week:

Offensive		Defensive		Freshman		Special teams	
Player	Team	Player	Team	Player	Team	Player	Team
Donald Liotine	Stony Brook	Troy Reeder	Delaware	Devin Young	Maine	D'Angelo Amos	James Madison

=== Week 8 ===
Date	Time	Visiting team	Home team	Site	Result	Attendance	Reference
October 20	1:30 p.m.	**Richmond**	**No. 11 Elon**	Rhodes Stadium • Elon, NC	**ELON** 38–28	5,982	
October 20	3:30 p.m.	**No. 16 Maine**	**William & Mary**	Zable Stadium • Williamsburg, VA	**W&M** 27–20	10,462	
October 20	3:30 p.m.	**No. 24 Delaware**	**New Hampshire**	Wildcat Stadium • Durham, NH	**DEL** 38–14	11,992	
October 20	3:30 p.m.	**No. 13 Towson**	**Albany**	Bob Ford Field • Albany, NY	**TOW** 56–28	7,029	
October 20	6:00 p.m.	**No. 22 Rhode Island**	**No. 18 Stony Brook**	Kenneth P. LaValle Stadium • Stony Brook, NY	**SBU** 52–14	12,701	

Players of the week:

Offensive		Defensive		Freshman		Special teams	
Player	Team	Player	Team	Player	Team	Player	Team
Tom Flacco	Towson	Troy Reeder	Delaware	Jaylan Thomas	Elon	Nasir Adderly	Delaware

=== Week 9 ===
Date	Time	Visiting team	Home team	Site	Result	Attendance	Reference
October 27	12:00 p.m.	**William & Mary**	**Rhode Island**	Meade Stadium • Kingston, RI	**URI** 21–10	1,688	
October 27	1:00 p.m.	**Albany**	**No. 24 Maine**	Alfond Stadium • Orono, ME	**MAINE** 28–9	9,248	
October 27	2:00 p.m.	**New Hampshire**	**Villanova**	Villanova Stadium • Villanova, PA	**UNH** 34–0	3,919	
October 27	3:30 p.m.	**No. 10 Towson**	**No. 21 Delaware**	Delaware Stadium • Newark, DE	**DEL** 40–36	14,593	
October 27	3:30 p.m.	**No. 15 Stony Brook**	**No. 3 James Madison**	Bridgeforth Stadium • Harrisonburg, VA	**JMU** 13–10	25,244	

Players of the week:

Offensive		Defensive		Freshman		Special teams	
Player	Team	Player	Team	Player	Team	Player	Team
Pat Kehoe	Delaware	Dimitri Holloway	James Madison	Carlos Washington Jr.	New Hampshire	Tyler Gray	James Madison

=== Week 10 ===
Date	Time	Visiting team	Home team	Site	Result	Attendance	Reference
November 3	1:00 p.m.	**No. 3 James Madison**	**New Hampshire**	Wildcat Stadium • Durham, NH	**UNH** 35–24	7,741	
November 3	1:30 p.m.	**Rhode Island**	**No. 8 Elon**	Rhodes Stadium • Elon, NC	**ELON** 24–21	10,513	
November 3	3:00 p.m.	**Villanova**	**Richmond**	E. Claiborne Robins Stadium • Richmond, VA	**VILL** 45–21	8,117	
November 3	3:30 p.m.	**No. 13 Delaware**	**Albany**	Bob Ford Field • Albany, NY	**DEL** 21–16	3,182	
November 3	4:00 p.m.	**No. 23 Maine**	**No. 15 Towson**	Johnny Unitas Stadium • Towson, MD	**MAINE** 35–28	7,356	

Players of the week:

Offensive		Defensive		Freshman		Special teams	
Player	Team	Player	Team	Player	Team	Player	Team
Jaylan Thomas	Elon	Warren Messer	Elon	Christian Benford; Ramon Jefferson	Villanova; Maine	Drew Kresge	Villanova

=== Week 11 ===
Date	Time	Visiting team	Home team	Site	Result	Attendance	Reference
November 10	12:00 p.m.	No. 20 Towson	No. 7 Elon	Rhodes Stadium • Elon, NC	**TOW** 41–10	5,927	
November 10	1:00 p.m.	William & Mary	Villanova	Villanova Stadium • Villanova, PA	**W&M** 24–17	4,105	
November 10	1:00 p.m.	Albany	New Hampshire	Wildcat Stadium • Durham, NH	**UNH** 24–10	5,571	
November 10	1:00 p.m.	No. 11 Delaware	No. 12 Stony Brook	Kenneth P. LaValle Stadium • Stony Brook, NY	**SBU** 17–3	6,667	
November 10	2:00 p.m.	Rhode Island	No. 9 James Madison	Bridgeforth Stadium • Harrisonburg, VA	**JMU** 48–31	24,199	
November 10	3:00 p.m.	No. 16 Maine	Richmond	E. Claiborne Robins Stadium • Richmond, VA	**MAINE** 28–9	7,820	

Players of the week:

Offensive		Defensive		Freshman		Special teams	
Player	Team	Player	Team	Player	Team	Player	Team
Ben DiNucci	James Madison	Robert Heyward; Isaiah Laster	Towson; William & Mary	Carlos Washington Jr.	New Hampshire	Aidan O'Neill	Towson

=== Week 12 ===
Date	Time	Visiting team	Home team	Site	Result	Attendance	Reference
November 17	12:00 p.m.	Villanova	No. 17 Delaware	Delaware Stadium • Newark, DE	**VILL** 42–21	18,752	
November 17	12:00 p.m.	No. 14 Elon	No. 16 Maine	Alfond Stadium • Orono, ME	**MAINE** 27–26	6,584	
November 17	12:00 p.m.	New Hampshire	Rhode Island	Meade Stadium • Kingston, RI	**URI** 24–21	3,012	
November 17	2:00 p.m.	No. 7 James Madison	No. 15 Towson	Johnny Unitas Stadium • Towson, MD	**JMU** 38–17	7,208	
November 17	2:00 p.m.	Richmond	William & Mary	Zable Stadium • Williamsburg, VA	**RICH** 10–6	9,739	
November 17	3:30 p.m.	No. 10 Stony Brook	Albany	Bob Ford Field • Albany, NY	**ALB** 25–23	2,483	

Players of the week:

Offensive		Defensive		Freshman		Special teams	
Player	Team	Player	Team	Player	Team	Player	Team
Aaron Forbes; Cardon Johnson	Villanova; James Madison	Maurice Jackson	Richmond	Ramon Jefferson	Maine	Earnest Edwards	Maine

== Attendance ==
Team	Stadium	Capacity	Game 1	Game 2	Game 3	Game 4	Game 5	Game 6	Total	Average	% of Capacity
Albany	Bob Ford Field	8,500	6,503	3,840	4,059	7,029	3,182	2,483	27,096	4,516	53%
Delaware	Delaware Stadium	22,000	17,945	12,781	14,511	19,209	14,593	18,752	97,791	16,299	74%
Elon	Rhodes Stadium	11,250	8,058	10,856	5,982	10,513	5,927		41,336	8,267	73%
James Madison	Bridgeforth Stadium	24,877	18,112	25,130	25,484	25,224	24,199		118,149	23,630	95%
Maine	Alfond Stadium	10,000	6,597	6,894	9,248	6,584			29,323	7,331	73%
New Hampshire	Wildcat Stadium	11,015	11,433	6,497	17,687	11,992	7,741	5,571	60,921	10,154	92%
Rhode Island	Meade Stadium	6,555	6,520	6,141	7,301	1,688	3,012		24,662	4,932	75%
Richmond	E. Claiborne Robins Stadium	8,217	8,057	8,217	8,217	8,117	7,820		40,428	8,086	98%
Stony Brook	Kenneth P. LaValle Stadium	12,300	5,708	6,272	7,720	12,701	6,667		39,068	7,814	64%
Towson	Johnny Unitas Stadium	11,198	7,323	4,614	8,002	7,356	7,208		34,503	6,901	62%
Villanova	Villanova Stadium	12,500	5,719	9,341	5,219	3,919	4,105		28,303	5,661	45%
William & Mary	Zable Stadium	12,672	9,191	7,530	10,462	9,739			36,922	9,231	73%

== NFL draft ==
The following list includes all CAA players who were drafted in the 2019 NFL draft.

Round #	Pick #	NFL team	Player	Position	College
2	60	Los Angeles Chargers	Nasir Adderley	S	Delaware
6	193	Minnesota Vikings	Oli Udoh	T	Elon
7	227	Washington Redskins	Jimmy Moreland	CB	James Madison
