= Nasir Adderley =

American football player (born 1997)

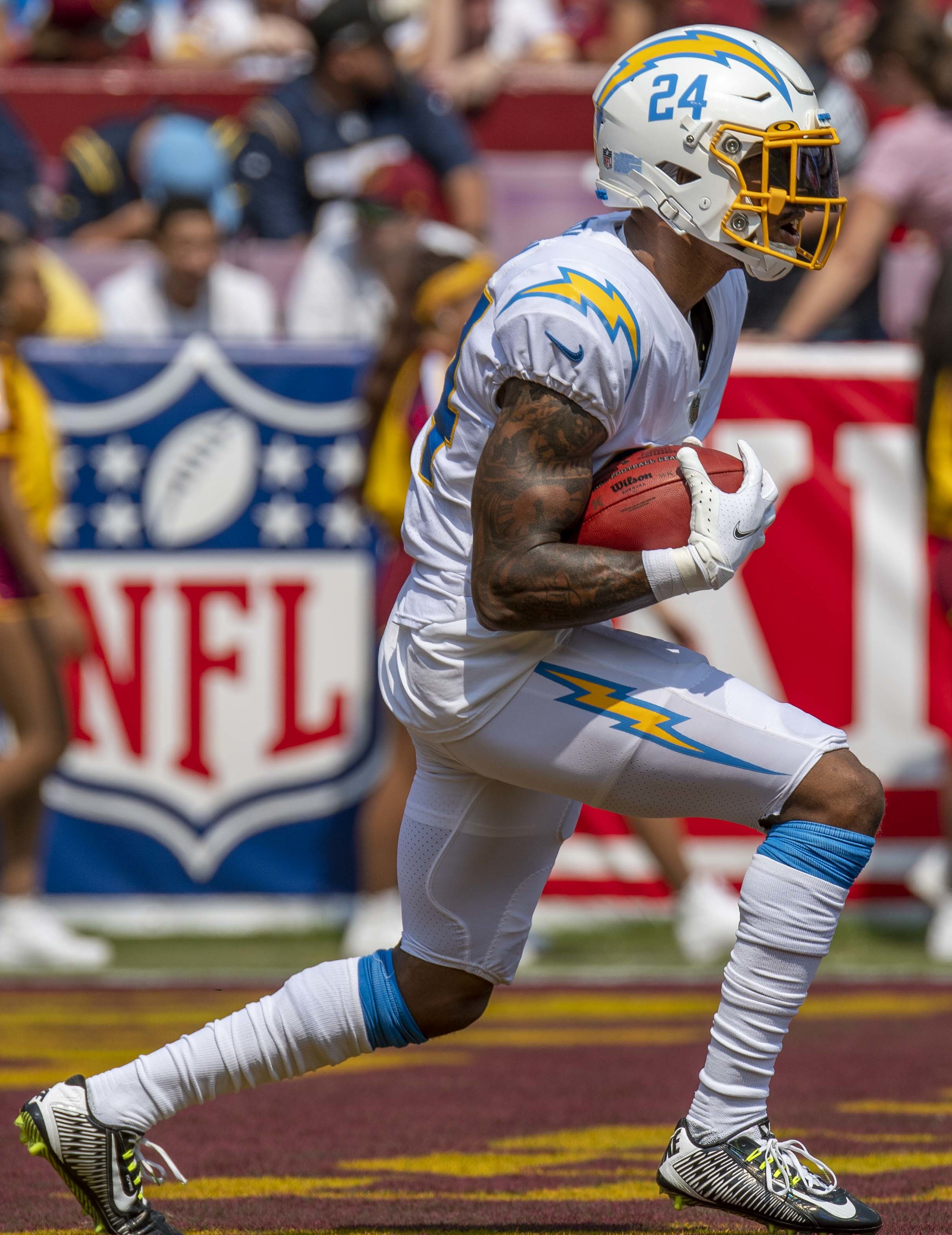
- Adderley with the Los Angeles Chargers in 2021

No. 24
- Position: Safety

Personal information
- Born: May 31, 1997 (age 29); Philadelphia, Pennsylvania, U.S.
- Listed height: 6 ft 0 in (1.83 m)
- Listed weight: 206 lb (93 kg)

Career information
- High school: Great Valley (Malvern, Pennsylvania)
- College: Delaware (2015–2018)
- NFL draft: 2019: 2nd round, 60th overall pick

Career history
- Los Angeles Chargers (2019–2022); Indianapolis Colts (2026)*
- * Offseason or practice squad member only

Awards and highlights
- 2× First-team All-CAA (2017, 2018)

Career NFL statistics
- Total tackles: 232
- Sacks: 0.5
- Forced fumbles: 2
- Fumble recoveries: 2
- Interceptions: 3
- Pass deflections: 12
- Stats at Pro Football Reference

Nasir Allan Adderley (born May 31, 1997) is an American former professional football safety. He played four seasons in the National Football League (NFL) for the Los Angeles Chargers from 2019 to 2022. He played college football for the Delaware Fightin' Blue Hens and was selected by the Chargers in the second round of the 2019 NFL draft.

== Early life ==
Adderley was born in Philadelphia, on May 31, 1997. He attended Great Valley High School in Malvern, Pennsylvania. He committed to the University of Delaware to play college football.

== College career ==
Adderley played at Delaware from 2015 to 2018. After spending his first two years as a cornerback, he switched to safety prior to his junior season in 2017. During his career, he had 226 tackles and 10 interceptions.

== Professional career ==
Pre-draft measurables
Height	Weight	Arm length	Hand span	40-yard dash	10-yard split	20-yard split	Vertical jump	Broad jump	Bench press
5 ft 11 3/4 in (1.82 m)	206 lb (93 kg)	31 in (0.79 m)	9 in (0.23 m)	4.54 s	1.61 s	2.71 s	38.0 in (0.97 m)	10 ft 9 in (3.28 m)	19 reps
All values from NFL Combine/Delaware Pro Day

=== Los Angeles Chargers ===
Adderley was selected by the Los Angeles Chargers in the second round (60th overall) of the 2019 NFL draft. He played in the first four games of the 2019 season, primarily on special teams, before aggravating a hamstring injury. Adderley missed the next three games before being placed on injured reserve on October 26, 2019.

In Week 5 of the 2020 season against the New Orleans Saints on Monday Night Football, Adderley recorded his first career interception off a pass thrown by Drew Brees during the 30–27 overtime loss. He made 15 appearances (14 starts) for Los Angeles during the regular season, compiling one interception, three pass deflections, one fumble recovery, and 69 combined tackles.

Adderley started all 15 of his appearances for the Chargers in 2021, recording five pass deflections, one forced fumble, one fumble recovery, 0.5 sacks, and 99 combined tackles. During the 2022 campaign, he made 16 appearances (15 starts) for Los Angeles, logging two interceptions, four pass deflections, one forced fumble, and 62 combined tackles.

Adderley announced his retirement from football at the age of 25 years old on March 16, 2023, after his contract with the Chargers expired.

=== Indianapolis Colts ===
On February 9, 2026, Adderley announced his intentions to return to the NFL. On April 14, the Indianapolis Colts signed Adderley to a one-year contract worth the veteran's minimum. He was released by the Colts on May 7.

== Personal life ==
His first cousin twice removed, Herb Adderley, was an NFL cornerback for the Green Bay Packers and was inducted in the Pro Football Hall of Fame in 1980.
