= Tom Flacco =

American gridiron football player (born 1994)

Profile
- Position: Quarterback

Personal information
- Born: November 2, 1994 (age 32); Audubon, New Jersey, U.S.
- Listed height: 6 ft 1 in (1.85 m)
- Listed weight: 205 lb (93 kg)

Career information
- High school: Eastern (NJ)
- College: Western Michigan (2015–2016); Rutgers (2017); Towson (2018–2019)
- NFL draft: 2020: undrafted

Career history

Playing
- Saskatchewan Roughriders (2021)*; Ottawa Redblacks (2021–2022)*; Houston Roughnecks (2024)*; San Antonio Brahmas (2024)
- * Offseason or practice squad member only

Coaching
- Delaware (2022–2023) Volunteer assistant coach/offense
- Stats at CFL.ca

Tom Patrick Flacco (born November 2, 1994) is an American football quarterback. He attended three colleges: Western Michigan, Rutgers, and Towson. He also played baseball, and was drafted in the 32nd round of the 2014 MLB draft by the Philadelphia Phillies. Flacco is the younger brother of NFL quarterback Joe Flacco. He has also had stints in the Canadian Football League (CFL) with the Saskatchewan Roughriders and Ottawa Redblacks.

== Early life ==
Flacco was born on November 2, 1994, in Audubon, New Jersey. After one year at Camden Catholic High School, he moved to Voorhees Township, New Jersey, and transferred to Eastern Regional High School, where he got the starting assignment as quarterback. He played baseball and football there which led to him being drafted in the 32nd round of the 2014 MLB draft by the Philadelphia Phillies. In football, he had over 7,250 passing yards including 2,782 yards as a senior. He also had 25 passing touchdowns and 12 rushing touchdowns in his senior year. His 7,000 plus passing yards were third most in school history at the time of his graduation.

== College career ==
=== Western Michigan ===
His first two seasons of college football came at Western Michigan. He played two seasons with them, mostly as a backup.

=== Rutgers ===
In 2017, he transferred to Rutgers University. Due to transfer rules, he could not play in the season. The next year he transferred to Towson.

=== Towson ===
His first season as a starter in college came in 2018, with the Towson Tigers. He was Towson's starting quarterback in all 12 games. He finished in the top-25 in several Football Championship Subdivision (FCS) categories, they included: finishing 3rd in total offense, 5th in passing yards, 12th in passing yards per game, 6th in passing touchdowns, 10th in completions per game, and 22nd in completion percentage. He was named Coastal Athletic Association (CAA) Offensive Player of the Week thrice, FCS Offensive Player of the Week once, and FCS Honorable Mention Player of the Week twice. He tied the Towson single season record with 28 passing touchdowns. He also was Towson's leader in rushing with 742 yards. Flacco had over 10 completions, 125 passing yards and more than one passing touchdown in every game. Flacco finished fifth for the Walter Payton Award and was named HERO Sports Third Team honors. Other honors include being named CAA Offensive Player of the Year and ECAC Offensive Player of the Year. Tom was also named All-CAA First Team.

His final season was in 2019. He finished 13th in voting for the Walter Payton award, being the first Towson player to ever be a finalist two separate seasons. In only two seasons with Towson, he was third in their history for passing touchdowns with 50. On October 19, he threw and ran for a combined 6 touchdowns in a win over Bucknell. He had 2,831 passing yards for 22 touchdowns in the season.

He made a return to baseball in 2019 after not playing since 2014. He played in 44 games with 38 starts.

== Professional career ==
Pre-draft measurables
Height	Weight	Arm length	Hand span
5 ft 11 3/4 in (1.82 m)	202 lb (92 kg)	30 1/8 in (0.77 m)	9 1/4 in (0.23 m)
All values from Pro Day

=== Saskatchewan Roughriders ===
Flacco went undrafted in the 2020 NFL draft. He reportedly had tryouts with the Arizona Cardinals, but did not sign with them. In January 2021, Flacco signed a contract with the Saskatchewan Roughriders of the Canadian Football League (CFL). He was released on July 30, 2021.

=== Ottawa Redblacks ===
On October 20, 2021, Flacco was signed by the Ottawa Redblacks of the CFL.

=== Houston Roughnecks ===
On December 8, 2023, Flacco signed with the Houston Roughnecks of the XFL. The Roughnecks brand was transferred to the Houston Gamblers when the XFL and United States Football League merged to create the United Football League (UFL).

=== San Antonio Brahmas ===
On January 31, 2024, Flacco was signed by the San Antonio Brahmas of the UFL. He was waived on May 1.

== Coaching career ==
In 2022, Flacco was named a volunteer assistant coach of offense for the Delaware Fightin' Blue Hens football team, the team his brother played for. He left in 2023 to join the UFL as a player.

== Personal life ==
Flacco has five older siblings. His oldest brother, Joe, is a quarterback for the Cincinnati Bengals, and previously the Cleveland Browns, Indianapolis Colts, Baltimore Ravens, Philadelphia Eagles, Denver Broncos, and New York Jets. Another brother, Mike, played four years of minor league baseball in the Baltimore Orioles organization, and was also briefly in the NFL. His brother John played as a safety at Stanford.
