= 2018 NCAA Division I FCS football rankings =

- Season: 2018
- Postseason: Single-elimination
- Preseason No. 1: North Dakota State
- National champions: North Dakota State
- Conference with most teams in final poll: CAA (6)

The 2018 National Collegiate Athletic Association (NCAA) Division I Football Championship Subdivision (FCS) football rankings consists of two human polls, in addition to various publications' preseason polls. Unlike the Football Bowl Subdivision (FBS), college football's governing body, the NCAA, bestows the national championship title through a 24-team tournament. The following weekly polls determine the top 25 teams at the NCAA Division I Football Championship Subdivision level of college football for the 2018 season. The STATS Poll is voted by media members while the Coaches Poll is determined by coaches at the FCS level.

The STATS preseason poll was released on August 6, 2018, with defending champions North Dakota State earning 151 of the 157 allotted first-place votes; defending runners-up James Madison earned the other six.

The Coaches Poll was released on August 13, 2018 - it consisted of an identical top six, with defending champions North Dakota State receiving 23 of the 26 first-place votes.

== Legend ==
Legend
| | Increase in ranking |
| | Decrease in ranking |
| | Not ranked previous week |
| | Selected for NCAA FCS Playoffs |
| (Italics) | Number of first place votes |
| (#–#) | Win–loss record |
| т | Tied with team above or below also with this symbol |

== STATS Poll ==
| | Preseason Aug 6 | Week 1 Sep 3 | Week 2 Sep 10 | Week 3 Sep 17 | Week 4 Sep 24 | Week 5 Oct 1 | Week 6 Oct 8 | Week 7 Oct 15 | Week 8 Oct 22 | Week 9 Oct 29 | Week 10 Nov 5 | Week 11 Nov 12 | Week 12 Nov 18 | Week 13 (Final) Jan 7 | |
|---|---|---|---|---|---|---|---|---|---|---|---|---|---|---|---|
| 1. | North Dakota State 151 | North Dakota State 157 (1–0) | North Dakota State 154 (1–0) | North Dakota State 152 (2–0) | North Dakota State 152 (3–0) | North Dakota State 155 (4–0) | North Dakota State 160 (5–0) | North Dakota State 160 (6–0) | North Dakota State 163 (7–0) | North Dakota State 160 (8–0) | North Dakota State 158 (9–0) | North Dakota State 155 (10–0) | North Dakota State 155 (11–0) | North Dakota State 156 (15–0) | 1. |
| 2. | James Madison 6 | James Madison 1 (0–1) | James Madison 2 (1–1) | James Madison 2 (2–1) | James Madison 3 (3–1) | James Madison 3 (4–1) | South Dakota State (3–1) | South Dakota State (4–1) | Kennesaw State (6–1) | Kennesaw State (7–1) | Kennesaw State (8–1) | Kennesaw State (9–1) | Kennesaw State (10–1) | Eastern Washington (12–3) | 2. |
| 3. | South Dakota State | South Dakota State (0–0) | South Dakota State (1–0) | South Dakota State (2–0) | South Dakota State (2–0) | South Dakota State (2–1) | Kennesaw State (5–1) | Kennesaw State (6–1) | James Madison (5–2) | James Madison (6–2) | Weber State (7–2) | Weber State (8–2) | Weber State (9–2) | South Dakota State (10–3) | 3. |
| 4. | Sam Houston State | Sam Houston State (0–0) | North Carolina A&T 3 (3–0) | North Carolina A&T 3 (3–0) | Kennesaw State (3–1) | Kennesaw State (4–1) | Eastern Washington (5–1) | James Madison (5–2) | Weber State (5–2) | Weber State (6–2) | UC Davis (8–1) | Eastern Washington (8–2) | Eastern Washington (9–2) | Maine (10–4) | 4. |
| 5. | Kennesaw State | North Carolina A&T 2 (2–0) | Sam Houston State (1–0) | Kennesaw State (2–1) | Eastern Washington (3–1) | Eastern Washington (4–1) | Elon (4–1) | Jacksonville State (5–1) | Eastern Washington (5–2) | Eastern Washington (6–2) | Eastern Washington (7–2) | South Dakota State (7–2) | South Dakota State (8–2) | Kennesaw State (11–2) | 5. |
| 6. | Jacksonville State | Eastern Washington (1–0) | Eastern Washington (2–0) | Eastern Washington (2–1) | Weber State (3–1) | Weber State (3–1) | James Madison (4–2) т | McNeese State (5–1) | UC Davis (6–1) | UC Davis (7–1) | South Dakota State (6–2) | Jacksonville State (8–2) | James Madison (8–3) | Weber State (10–3) | 6. |
| 7. | New Hampshire | Kennesaw State (0–1) | Kennesaw State (1–1) | Weber State (2–1) | Wofford (2–1) | Wofford (3–1) | Wofford (4–1) т | Weber State (4–2) | South Dakota State (4–2) | South Dakota State (5–2) | Elon (6–2) | James Madison (7–3) | UC Davis (9–2) | UC Davis (10–3) | 7. |
| 8. | Weber State | Wofford (1–0) | Wofford (2–0) | Wofford (2–1) | Jacksonville State (2–1) | Jacksonville State (3–1) | Jacksonville State (4–1) | Illinois State (5–1) | Elon (5–2) | Elon (5–2) | Jacksonville State (7–2) | Colgate (9–0) | Jacksonville State (8–3) | Colgate (10–2) | 8. |
| 9. | Eastern Washington | Samford (1–0) | Samford (1–1) | McNeese State (3–0) | Illinois State (3–0) | McNeese State (4–1) | McNeese State (5–1) | Eastern Washington (5–2) | Wofford (5–2) | Wofford (6–2) | James Madison (6–3) | UC Davis (8–2) | Colgate (9–1) | James Madison (9–4) | 9. |
| 10. | Wofford | Weber State (0–1) | Villanova (2–0) | Jacksonville State (1–1) | McNeese State (3–1) | Elon (3–1) | North Carolina A&T (5–1) | UC Davis (5–1) | Towson (6–1) | Jacksonville State (6–2) | Colgate (8–0) | Stony Brook (7–3) | Princeton (10–0) | Jacksonville State (9–4) | 10. |
| 11. | Samford | Nicholls (1–0) | Weber State (1–1) | Sam Houston State (1–1) | Elon (2–1) | North Carolina A&T (4–1) | Nicholls (4–2) | Elon (4–2) | Illinois State (5–2) | McNeese State (6–2) | Delaware (7–2) | Princeton (9–0) | North Carolina A&T (9–2) | Princeton (10–0) | 11. |
| 12. | Elon | Villanova (1–0) | Jacksonville State (1–1) | Elon (1–1) | North Carolina A&T (3–1) | Nicholls (3–2) | Illinois State (4–1) | Wofford (4–2) | Jacksonville State (5–2) | Colgate (7–0) | Stony Brook (6–3) | North Carolina A&T (8–2) | Maine (8–3) | North Carolina A&T (10–2) | 12. |
| 13. | Northern Iowa | Jacksonville State (0–1) | Nicholls (1–1) | Maine (2–0) | Villanova (3–1) т | Stony Brook (4–1) | Weber State (3–2) | Towson (5–1) | Central Arkansas (5–2) | Delaware (6–2) | Princeton (8–0) | Wofford (7–3) | Wofford (8–3) | Wofford (9–4) | 13. |
| 14. | North Carolina A&T | Montana (1–0) | Elon (1–1) | Central Arkansas (2–1) | Central Arkansas (2–1) т | Montana (4–1) | UC Davis (4–1) | Sam Houston State (4–2) | McNeese State (5–2) | Illinois State (5–3) | North Carolina A&T (7–2) | Elon (6–3) | Nicholls (8–3) | Nicholls (9–4) | 14. |
| 15. | Delaware | Elon (0–1) | Montana (2–0) | Villanova (2–1) | Nicholls (2–2) | Illinois State (3–1) | Sam Houston State (3–2) | Central Arkansas (4–2) | Stony Brook (6–2) | Towson (6–2) | Wofford (6–3) | Towson (7–3) | Stony Brook (7–4) | Southeast Missouri State (9–4) | 15. |
| 16. | Central Arkansas | McNeese State (1–0) | McNeese State (2–0) | Illinois State (2–0) | Maine (2–1) | UC Davis (3–1) | Rhode Island (4–1) | Maine (4–2) | Colgate (6–0) | Stony Brook (6–3) | Maine (6–3) | Maine (7–3) | Towson (7–4) | Stony Brook (7–5) | 16. |
| 17. | McNeese State | Central Arkansas (0–1) | Maine (2–0) | Samford (1–2) | Montana (3–1) | Sam Houston State (2–2) | Towson (4–1) | Colgate (6–0) | Northern Iowa (4–3) | North Carolina A&T (6–2) | Nicholls (6–3) | Delaware (7–3) | Elon (6–4) | Montana State (8–5) | 17. |
| 18. | Nicholls | Northern Arizona (1–0) | Central Arkansas (1–1) | Nicholls (1–2) | Stony Brook (3–1) | Rhode Island (3–1) | Central Arkansas (3–2) | Stony Brook (5–2) | North Carolina A&T (6–2) | Princeton (7–0) | McNeese State (6–3) | Nicholls (7–3) | Dartmouth (9–1) | Dartmouth (9–1) | 18. |
| 19. | Villanova | Illinois State (1–0) | Illinois State (2–0) | Montana (2–1) | UC Davis (3–1) | Villanova (3–2) | Stony Brook (4–2) | North Carolina A&T (5–2) | Princeton (6–0) | Central Arkansas (5–3) | East Tennessee State (8–2) | East Tennessee State (8–2) | San Diego (9–2) | Elon (6–5) | 19. |
| 20. | Stony Brook | New Hampshire (0–1) | Northern Arizona (1–1) | Stony Brook (2–1) | Chattanooga (4–0) | Central Arkansas (2–2) | Colgate (5–0) | Nicholls (4–3) | Nicholls (4–3) | Nicholls (5–3) | Towson (6–3) | Dartmouth (8–1) | Southeast Missouri State (8–3) | Towson (7–5) | 20. |
| 21. | Illinois State | Northern Iowa (0–1) | Northern Iowa (0–1) | UC Davis (2–1) | Sam Houston State (1–2) | Colgate (4–0) | Maine (3–2) | East Tennessee State (6–1) | Delaware (5–2) | Sam Houston State (5–3) | Southeast Missouri State (7–2) | San Diego (8–2) | Delaware (7–4) | Duquesne (9–4) | 21. |
| 22. | Austin Peay | Maine (1–0) | South Dakota (1–1) | North Dakota (2–1) | Rhode Island (2–1) | Northern Iowa (2–2) | Montana (4–2) | Rhode Island (4–2) | North Dakota (5–2) | East Tennessee State (7–2) | Northern Iowa (5–4) | McNeese State (6–4) | East Tennessee State (8–3) | East Tennessee State (8–4) | 22. |
| 23. | Furman | South Dakota (0–1) | UC Davis (2–0) | Rhode Island (2–1) | Northern Iowa (1–2) | Towson (3–1) | East Tennessee State (5–1) | Princeton (5–0) | Sam Houston State (4–3) | Maine (5–3) | Illinois State (5–4) | Southeast Missouri State (7–3) | Montana State (7–4) | Northern Iowa (7–6) | 23. |
| 24. | Montana | Stony Brook (0–1) | Stony Brook (1–1) | Austin Peay (2–1) | Colgate (3–0) | Missouri State (3–1) | South Dakota (3–2) | Delaware (4–2) | Maine (4–3) | Dartmouth (7–0) | Idaho State (6–3) | Incarnate Word (6–4) | Incarnate Word (6–4) | Delaware (7–5) | 24. |
| 25. | Youngstown State | Furman (0–1) | Rhode Island (2–0) | Northern Iowa (0–2) | Towson (2–1) | Maine (2–2) | Princeton (4–0) | Northern Iowa (3–3) | East Tennessee State (6–2) | Southeast Missouri State (6–2) | Dartmouth (7–1) | Montana State (6–4) | Indiana State (7–4) | San Diego (9–3) | 25. |
| | Preseason Aug 6 | Week 1 Sep 3 | Week 2 Sep 10 | Week 3 Sep 17 | Week 4 Sep 24 | Week 5 Oct 1 | Week 6 Oct 8 | Week 7 Oct 15 | Week 8 Oct 22 | Week 9 Oct 29 | Week 10 Nov 5 | Week 11 Nov 12 | Week 12 Nov 18 | Week 13 (Final) Jan 7 | |
| | | Dropped: 15. Delaware; 22. Austin Peay; 25. Youngstown State | Dropped: 20. New Hampshire; 25. Furman | Dropped: 20. Northern Arizona | Dropped: 17. Samford; 22. North Dakota; 24. Austin Peay | Dropped: 20. Chattanooga | Dropped: 19. Villanova; 22. Northern Iowa; 24. Missouri State | Dropped: 22. Montana; 24. South Dakota | Dropped: 22. Rhode Island | Dropped: 17. Northern Iowa; 22. North Dakota | Dropped: 19. Central Arkansas; 21. Sam Houston State | Dropped: 22. Northern Iowa; 23. Illinois State; 24. Idaho State | Dropped: 22. McNeese State | Dropped: 24. Incarnate Word; 25. Indiana State | |

== Coaches Poll ==
| | Preseason Aug 13 | Week 1 Sep 3 | Week 2 Sep 10 | Week 3 Sep 17 | Week 4 Sep 24 | Week 5 Oct 1 | Week 6 Oct 8 | Week 7 Oct 15 | Week 8 Oct 22 | Week 9 Oct 29 | Week 10 Nov 5 | Week 11 Nov 12 | Week 12 Nov 18 | Week 13 (Final) Jan 7 | |
|---|---|---|---|---|---|---|---|---|---|---|---|---|---|---|---|
| 1. | North Dakota State 23 | North Dakota State 26 (1–0) | North Dakota State 25 (1–0) | North Dakota State 26 (2–0) | North Dakota State 26 (3–0) | North Dakota State 26 (4–0) | North Dakota State 26 (5–0) | North Dakota State 26 (6–0) | North Dakota State 26 (7–0) | North Dakota State 26 (8–0) | North Dakota State 26 (9–0) | North Dakota State 26 (10–0) | North Dakota State 26 (11–0) | North Dakota State 26 (15–0) | 1. |
| 2. | James Madison 3 | James Madison (0–1) | James Madison 1 (1–1) | James Madison (2–1) | James Madison (2–1) | James Madison (4–1) | Kennesaw State (5–1) | Kennesaw State (6–1) | Kennesaw State (6–1) | Kennesaw State (7–1) | Kennesaw State (8–1) | Kennesaw State (9–1) | Kennesaw State (10–1) | Eastern Washington (12–3) | 2. |
| 3. | South Dakota State | South Dakota State (0–0) | South Dakota State (1–0) | South Dakota State (2–0) | South Dakota State (2–0) | Kennesaw State (4–1) | Eastern Washington (5–1) | South Dakota State (4–1) | James Madison (5–2) | James Madison (6–2) | Eastern Washington (7–2) | Eastern Washington (8–2) | Eastern Washington (9–2) | South Dakota State (10–3) | 3. |
| 4. | Sam Houston State | Sam Houston State (0–0) | Sam Houston State (1–0) | North Carolina A&T (3–0) | Kennesaw State (3–1) | Eastern Washington (4–1) т | Wofford (4–1) | Jacksonville State (5–1) | Eastern Washington (5–2) | Eastern Washington (6–2) | Weber State (7–2) | Weber State (8–2) | Weber State (9–2) | Kennesaw State (11–2) | 4. |
| 5. | Kennesaw State | Eastern Washington (1–0) | Eastern Washington (2–0) | Kennesaw State (2–1) | Eastern Washington (3–1) | South Dakota State (2–1) т | South Dakota State (3–1) | James Madison (5–2) | Weber State (5–2) | Weber State (6–2) | Elon (6–2) | South Dakota State (7–2) | South Dakota State (8–2) | Maine (10–4) | 5. |
| 6. | Jacksonville State | North Carolina A&T (2–0) | North Carolina A&T (3–0) | Eastern Washington (2–1) т | Wofford (2–1) | Wofford (3–1) | Elon (4–1) | McNeese State (5–1) | Elon (5–2) | Elon (5–2) | South Dakota State (6–2) | Colgate (9–0) | James Madison (8–3) | Weber State (10–3) | 6. |
| 7. | Eastern Washington | Wofford (1–0) | Wofford (2–0) | Wofford (2–1) т | Weber State (3–1) | Weber State (3–1) | Jacksonville State (4–1) | Illinois State (5–1) | Wofford (5–2) | South Dakota State (5–2) | UC Davis (8–1) | Jacksonville State (8–2) | Colgate (9–1) | Colgate (10–2) | 7. |
| 8. | Weber State | Kennesaw State (0–1) | Kennesaw State (1–1) | Weber State (2–1) | Jacksonville State (2–1) | Jacksonville State (3–1) | James Madison (4–2) | Eastern Washington (5–2) | South Dakota State (4–2) | Wofford (6–2) | Colgate (8–0) | James Madison (7–3) | Princeton (10–0) | UC Davis (10–3) | 8. |
| 9. | New Hampshire | Samford (1–0) | Samford (1–1) | Jacksonville State (1–1) | Elon (2–1) | Elon (3–1) | McNeese State (5–1) | Weber State (4–2) | Illinois State (5–2) | UC Davis (7–1) | Jacksonville State (7–2) | Princeton (9–0) | Jacksonville State (8–3) | Princeton (10–0) | 9. |
| 10. | Samford | Nicholls (1–0) | Villanova (2–0) | McNeese State (3–0) | Illinois State (3–0) | McNeese State (4–1) | North Carolina A&T (5–1) | Sam Houston State (4–2) | Towson (6–1) | Jacksonville State (6–2) | James Madison (6–3) | Stony Brook (7–3) | UC Davis (9–2) | James Madison (9–4) | 10. |
| 11. | Wofford | Villanova (1–0) | Jacksonville State (1–1) | Sam Houston State (1–1) | McNeese State (3–1) | North Carolina A&T (4–1) | Nicholls (4–2) | Elon (4–2) | Colgate (6–0) | Colgate (7–0) | Princeton (8–0) | UC Davis (8–2) | North Carolina A&T (9–2) | North Carolina A&T (10–2) | 11. |
| 12. | Northern Iowa | Jacksonville State (0–1) | Nicholls (1–1) | Elon (1–1) | Central Arkansas (2–1) | Nicholls (3–2) | Illinois State (4–1) | Wofford (4–2) | Jacksonville State (5–2) | McNeese State (6–2) | Delaware (7–2) | Elon (6–3) | Wofford (8–3) | Wofford (9–4) | 12. |
| 13. | Elon | Weber State (0–1) | Weber State (1–1) | Central Arkansas (2–1) | North Carolina A&T (3–1) | Stony Brook (4–1) | Weber State (3–2) | Colgate (6–0) | UC Davis (6–1) | Illinois State (5–3) | North Carolina A&T (7–2) | North Carolina A&T (8–2) | Nicholls (8–3) | Jacksonville State (9–4) | 13. |
| 14. | North Carolina A&T | McNeese State (1–0) | Elon (1–1) | Villanova (2–1) | Villanova (3–1) | Illinois State (3–1) | Sam Houston State (3–2) | Towson (5–1) | Central Arkansas (5–2) | Princeton (7–0) | Wofford (6–3) | Wofford (7–3) | Maine (8–3) | Nicholls (9–4) | 14. |
| 15. | Central Arkansas | Elon (0–1) | McNeese State (2–0) | Illinois State (2–0) | Nicholls (2–2) | Montana (4–1) | Rhode Island (4–1) | Central Arkansas (4–2) | Stony Brook (6–2) | Towson (6–2) | Stony Brook (6–3) | Nicholls (7–3) | Dartmouth (9–1) | Dartmouth (9–1) | 15. |
| 16. | Delaware | Montana (1–0) | Montana (2–0) | Maine (2–0) | Maine (2–1) | Sam Houston State (2–2) | Central Arkansas (3–2) | UC Davis (5–1) | McNeese State (5–2) | Delaware (6–2) | Nicholls (6–3) | Towson (7–3) | Stony Brook (7–4) | Southeast Missouri State (9–4) | 16. |
| 17. | Nicholls | Central Arkansas (0–1) | Central Arkansas (1–1) | Samford (1–2) | Stony Brook (3–1) | Rhode Island (3–1) | Colgate (5–0) | Stony Brook (5–2) | Princeton (6–0) | North Carolina A&T (6–2) | East Tennessee State (8–2) | East Tennessee State (8–2) | Elon (6–4) | Montana State (8–5) | 17. |
| 18. | McNeese State | Northern Iowa (0–1) | Northern Iowa (0–1) т | Nicholls (1–2) | Montana (3–1) | Central Arkansas (2–2) | Towson (4–1) | North Carolina A&T (5–2) т | North Carolina A&T (6–2) | Stony Brook (6–3) | McNeese State (6–3) | Delaware (7–3) | San Diego (9–2) | Stony Brook (7–5) | 18. |
| 19. | Villanova | Illinois State (1–0) | Illinois State (2–0) т | Stony Brook (2–1) | Sam Houston State (1–2) | Villanova (3–2) | UC Davis (4–1) | Princeton (5–0) т | Nicholls (4–3) | Central Arkansas (5–3) | Southeast Missouri State (7–2) | Maine (7–3) | Towson (7–4) | Elon (6–5) | 19. |
| 20. | Illinois State | Northern Arizona (1–0) | Maine (2–0) | Montana (2–1) | Rhode Island (2–1) | Colgate (4–0) | Stony Brook (4–2) | Maine (4–2) | Dartmouth (6–0) | Dartmouth (7–0) т | Towson (6–3) | Dartmouth (8–1) | Southeast Missouri State (8–3) | San Diego (9–3) | 20. |
| 21. | Furman | Furman (0–1) | Stony Brook (1–1) | Austin Peay (2–1) | Northern Iowa (1–2) | UC Davis (3–1) | Princeton (4–0) | East Tennessee State (6–1) | Delaware (5–2) | Nicholls (5–3) т | Maine (6–3) | McNeese State (6–4) | East Tennessee State (8–3) | East Tennessee State (8–4) | 21. |
| 22. | Stony Brook | New Hampshire (0–1) | Northern Arizona (1–1) | Northern Iowa (0–2) | UC Davis (3–1) | Northern Iowa (2–2) | Maine (3–2) | Nicholls (4–3) | Sam Houston State (4–3) | Sam Houston State (5–3) | Illinois State (5–4) | San Diego (8–2) | Indiana State (7–4) | Towson (7–5) | 22. |
| 23. | Austin Peay | Stony Brook (1–0) | Austin Peay (1–1) | Rhode Island (2–1) | Colgate (3–0) | Princeton (3–0) | Montana (4–2) | Rhode Island (4–2) | Northern Iowa (4–3) | East Tennessee State (7–2) | Dartmouth (7–1) | Southeast Missouri State (7–3) | Delaware (7–4) | Delaware (7–5) | 23. |
| 24. | Youngstown State | Austin Peay (0–1) | South Dakota (1–1) | Colgate (2–0) | Chattanooga (4–0) | Towson (3–1) | East Tennessee State (5–1) | Dartmouth (5–0) | North Dakota (5–2) | Southeast Missouri State (6–2) | Northern Iowa (5–4) | Indiana State (6–4) | Montana State (7–4) | Duquesne (9–4) | 24. |
| 25. | Montana | Maine (1–0) | Colgate (2–0) | UC Davis (2–1) | Princeton (2–0) | Maine (2–2) | Villanova (3–3) | Delaware (4–2) | East Tennessee State (6–2) | North Dakota (5–3) | Idaho State (6–3) | North Dakota (6–4) | Incarnate Word (6–4) | Indiana State (7–4) | 25. |
| | Preseason Aug 13 | Week 1 Sep 3 | Week 2 Sep 10 | Week 3 Sep 17 | Week 4 Sep 24 | Week 5 Oct 1 | Week 6 Oct 8 | Week 7 Oct 15 | Week 8 Oct 22 | Week 9 Oct 29 | Week 10 Nov 5 | Week 11 Nov 12 | Week 12 Nov 18 | Week 13 (Final) Jan 7 | |
| | | Dropped: 16. Delaware; 24. Youngstown State | Dropped: 21. Furman; 22. New Hampshire | Dropped: 22. Northern Arizona; 24. South Dakota | Dropped: 17. Samford; 21. Austin Peay | Dropped: 24. Chattanooga | Dropped: 22. Northern Iowa | Dropped: 23. Montana; 25. Villanova | Dropped: 20. Maine; 23. Rhode Island | Dropped: 23. Northern Iowa | Dropped: 19. Central Arkansas; 22. Sam Houston State; 25. North Dakota | Dropped: 22. Illinois State; 24. Northern Iowa; 25. Idaho State | Dropped: 21. McNeese State; 25. North Dakota | Dropped: 25. Incarnate Word | |
