= FanDuel Sports Network app =

Defunct Fanduel Sports Network's over-the-top service

Fanduel Sports Network app
- Website type: Sports broadcasting
- Predecessor: Bally Sports
- Owner: Main Street Sports Group
- Creator: Sinclair Digital Interactive Solutions
- Parent: Hudson Bay Capital Management and PGIM
- Website: fanduelsportsnetwork.com (Website no longer maintained)
- Launched: October 21, 2024; 23 months ago As Bally Sports: April 26, 2021; 5 years ago As Fox Sports Go: October 8, 2013; 12 years ago
- Current status: Defunct

The FanDuel Sports Network app was the video streaming service of FanDuel Sports Network. The service was available for customers of select cable and satellite TV providers.

== History ==
Initial Bally Sports app logo at conversion from the Fox Sports Go

The service was initially introduced as Fox Sports' TV Everywhere service, including access to content from networks such as Fox Sports 1 and Big Ten Network (the latter already offered under the brand BTN2Go). Super Bowl XLVIII was streamed for free without authentication on personal computers and tablets, but not on mobile phones due to exclusive rights held by Verizon Wireless. The event averaged 1.7 million viewers on the platform.

For regional telecasts on the Fox Sports Networks, NBA games were available, and Major League Baseball games became available starting with the 2016 season, after Fox Sports and MLB came to an agreement for in-market streaming rights in November 2015. Fox reached a similar deal for regional National Hockey League games beginning in the 2016–17 season.

Old Fox Sports Go logo

In 2019, Fox Sports Networks was sold to Diamond Sports Group, a joint venture between Sinclair Broadcast Group and Entertainment Studios, as part of The Walt Disney Company's purchase of Fox's entertainment assets; Fox also sought to divest Fox Sports Networks but were barred from selling them to Disney by federal regulators. The sale included rights to the Fox Sports Go platform; as a result, streaming of national Fox Sports channels (such as Fox Sports 1, Fox Sports 2, and Big Ten Network) and programming was moved exclusively to FoxSports.com and the Fox Sports app, leaving Fox Sports Go to only carry content from the regional networks. The national Fox Sports content continued to be listed on the Fox Sports Go main page as external links during an interim brand-licensing period.

On March 10, 2021, the programming from YES Network (which is also partially owned by Sinclair) was separated from FSGO and moved to a dedicated app.

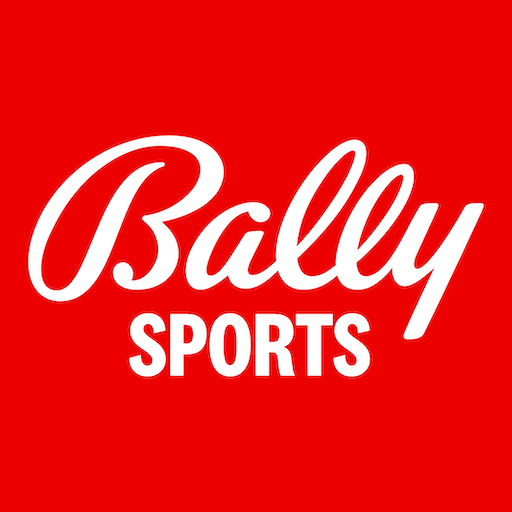
Former app icon as Bally Sports, used from 2021 to 2024.

The Fox Sports Go app was scheduled to be relaunched as part of the Bally Sports rebranding of the Fox Sports Networks on March 31, 2021, but the new app was delayed to a then unspecified date. On April 26, 2021, the Bally Sports app was launched.

On June 23, 2022, Bally Sports soft-launched its Bally Sports Plus (or Bally Sports+) direct-to-consumers (DTC) service, which is accessible through the Bally Sports app. The service is available initially in five MLB cities: Detroit, Kansas City, Miami, Milwaukee, and Tampa. It launched nationally in the remainder of the networks' footprint on September 26.

On March 14, 2023, Diamond Sports Group filed for Chapter 11 bankruptcy protection; its restructuring plan included a proposal for the company to be separated from the Sinclair Broadcast Group into a standalone company. By January 17, 2024, Diamond Sports announced a restructuring agreement after receiving a minority investment from Amazon, and reaching an agreement with the Sinclair Broadcast Group for a $495 million cash payment to settle an earlier lawsuit. Under the deal, the Bally Sports app will be folded into Amazon Prime Video. The restructuring still needs to be approved by the bankruptcy court. On October 16, 2024, it was revealed in a court filing that Diamond had reached a new sponsorship agreement with FanDuel Group, under which it intends to rebrand Bally Sports as the FanDuel Sports Network. Diamond officially announced the rebrand on October 18, which took effect October 21. The Bally Sports app would simply be updated into the new FanDuel Sports Network app.
