= 2018 Ivy League football season =

- League: NCAA Division I Football Championship Subdivision
- Sport: Football
- Duration: September 14, 2018 – November 17, 2018
- Teams: 8
- TV partner: ESPNU

Regular season
- Champions: Princeton

Football seasons
- 2017 2019

2018 Ivy League football standings
	Conf.			Overall
Team	W		L	W		L
No. 11 Princeton $	7	–	0	10	–	0
No. 18 Dartmouth	6	–	1	9	–	1
Harvard	4	–	3	6	–	4
Yale	3	–	4	5	–	5
Penn	3	–	4	6	–	4
Columbia	3	–	4	6	–	4
Cornell	2	–	5	3	–	7
Brown	0	–	7	1	–	9
$ – Conference champion; Rankings from STATS Poll

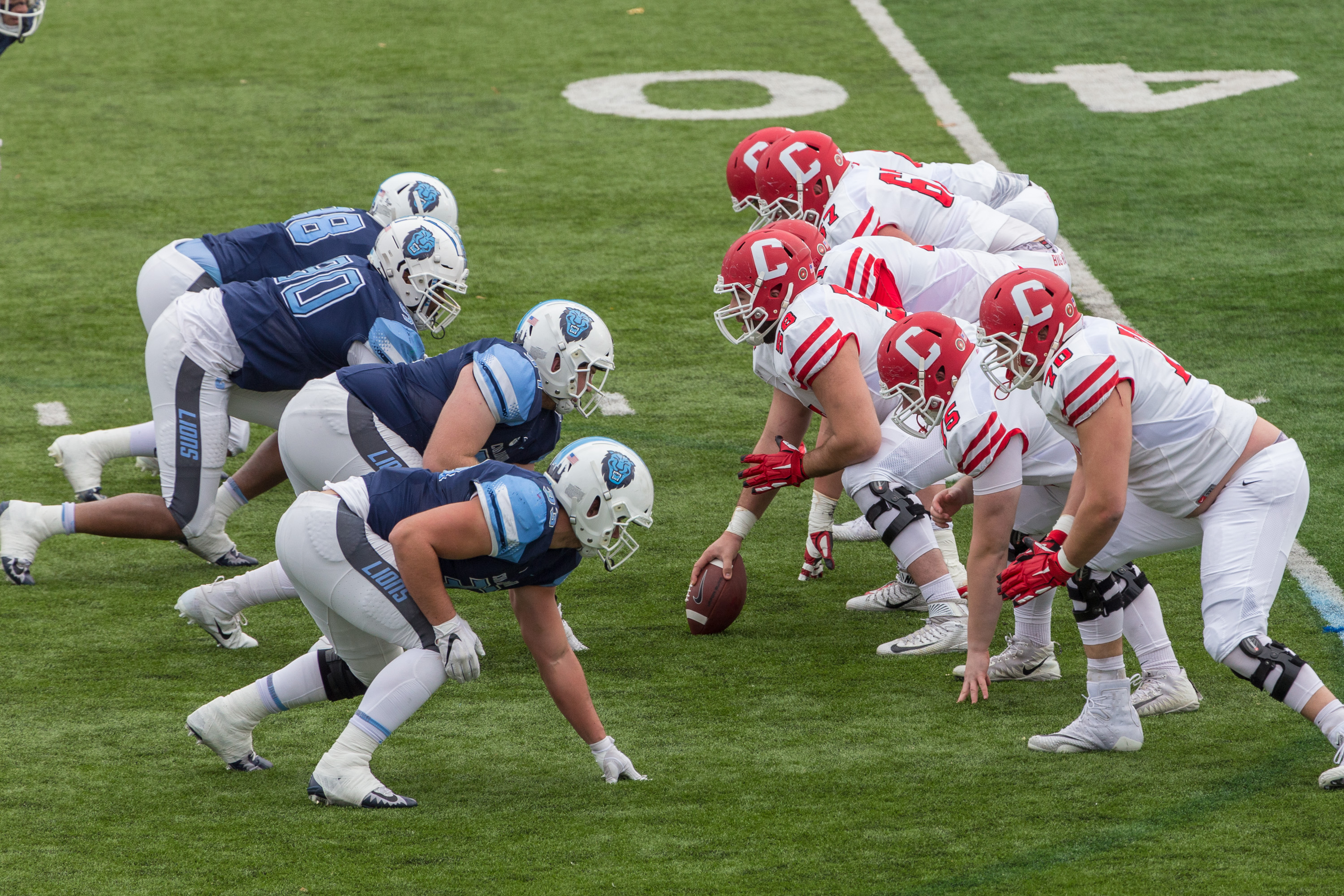
The Columbia Lions defeated Cornell Big Red 24–21 at Wien Stadium, November 17

The 2018 Ivy League football season was the 63rd season of college football play for the Ivy League and was part of the 2018 NCAA Division I FCS football season. The season began on September 14, 2018, and ended on November 17, 2018. Ivy League teams were 18–6 against non-conference opponents and Princeton won the conference championship, compiling a perfect 10–0 record.

== Season overview ==
=== Preseason polling ===
The preseason media poll results became public on August 20, 2018, with Yale predicted to win the Ivy League. Yale won 11 of 17 first place votes in the poll.

Predicted finish	Team	Points
1	Yale	129
2	Princeton	104
3	Harvard	99
T–4	Columbia	76
T–4	Penn	76
6	Dartmouth	65
7	Cornell	37
8	Brown	26

=== Final standings ===
Conf. Rank	Team	Head coach	STATS final	STATS high	Overall record	Conf. record	PPG	PAG
1	Princeton	Bob Surace	TBA	10	10–0	7–0	47.0	13.0
2	Dartmouth	Buddy Teevens	TBA	18	9–1	6–1	33.4	12.0
3	Harvard	Tim Murphy	NR	NR	6–4	4–3	30.4	21.8
4	Yale	Tony Reno	NR	NR	5–5	3–4	29.5	28.5
5 (tie)	Penn	Ray Priore	NR	NR	6–4	3–4	18.6	20.9
5 (tie)	Columbia	Al Bagnoli	NR	NR	6–4	3–4	23.1	25.2
7	Cornell	David Archer	NR	NR	3–7	2–5	19.1	29.7
8	Brown	Phil Estes	NR	NR	1–9	0–7	14.3	36.2

== Schedule ==
=== Week 1 ===
Date	Time	Visiting team	Home team	Site	TV	Result	Attendance	Ref.
September 14	10:00 p.m.	Brown	Cal Poly	Alex G. Spanos Stadium • San Luis Obispo, CA		L 15–44	7,725	
September 15	12:00 p.m.	San Diego	Harvard	Harvard Stadium • Boston, MA		W 36–14	8,709	
September 15	1:00 p.m.	Yale	Holy Cross	Fitton Field • Worcester, MA		L 28–31 ^{OT}	7,397	
September 15	1:30 p.m.	Georgetown	Dartmouth	Memorial Field • Hanover, NH		W 41–0	4,815	
September 15	3:00 p.m.	Bucknell	Penn	Franklin Field • Philadelphia, PA		W 34–17	5,033	
September 15	3:30 p.m.	Cornell	Delaware	Delaware Stadium • Newark, DE		L 10–27	14,511	
September 15	5:00 p.m.	Columbia	Central Connecticut State	Arute Field • New Britain, CT		W 41–24	3,789	
September 15	6:00 p.m.	Princeton	Butler	Bud and Jackie Sellick Bowl • Indianapolis, IN		W 50–7	4,527	
^{#}Rankings from STATS Poll. All times are in Eastern Time.

=== Week 2 ===
Date	Time	Visiting team	Home team	Site	TV	Result	Attendance	Ref.
September 21	7:00 p.m.	Harvard	Brown	Brown Stadium • Providence, RI	ESPNU	HAR 36–14	9,309	
September 22	1:00 p.m.	Dartmouth	Holy Cross	Fitton Field • Worcester, MA		W 34–14	7,175	
September 22	2:00 p.m.	Columbia	Georgetown	Cooper Field • Washington, DC (Lou Little Cup)		W 23–15	1,865	
September 22	3:00 p.m.	Yale	Cornell	Schoellkopf Field • Ithaca, NY		YALE 30–24	12,801	
September 22	3:00 p.m.	Lehigh	Penn	Franklin Field • Philadelphia, PA		W 30–10	4,445	
September 22	4:30 p.m.	Monmouth	Princeton	Princeton Stadium • Princeton, NJ		W 51–9	11,068	
^{#}Rankings from STATS Poll. All times are in Eastern Time.

=== Week 3 ===
Date	Time	Visiting team	Home team	Site	TV	Result	Attendance	Ref.
September 28	6:00 p.m.	Princeton	Columbia	Wien Stadium • New York City, NY	ESPNU	PRIN 45–10	5,327	
September 28	7:00 p.m.	No. 22 Rhode Island	Harvard	Harvard Stadium • Boston, MA		L 16–23	9,123	
September 29	1:00 p.m.	Georgetown	Brown	Brown Stadium • Providence, RI		W 35–7	3,926	
September 29	1:00 p.m.	No. 16 Maine	Yale	Yale Bowl • New Haven, CT		W 35–14	7,889	
September 29	1:30 p.m.	Sacred Heart	Cornell	Schoellkopf Field • Ithaca, NY		W 43–24	3,620	
September 29	1:30 p.m.	Penn	Dartmouth	Memorial Field • Hanover, NH		DART 37–14	3,692	
^{#}Rankings from STATS Poll. All times are in Eastern Time.

=== Week 4 ===
Date	Time	Visiting team	Home team	Site	TV	Result	Attendance	Ref.
October 5	6:00 p.m.	Dartmouth	Yale	Yale Bowl • New Haven, CT	ESPNU	DART 41–18	10,176	
October 6	1:00 p.m.	Brown	No. 18 Rhode Island	Meade Stadium • Kingston, RI (Rivalry)		L 0–48	6,141	
October 6	1:00 p.m.	Marist	Columbia	Wien Stadium • New York City, NY		W 34–24	3,296	
October 6	1:00 p.m.	Lehigh	Princeton	Princeton Stadium • Princeton, NJ		W 66–7	1,013	
October 6	1:30 p.m.	Harvard	Cornell	Schoellkopf Field • Ithaca, NY		COR 28–24	8,040	
October 6	3:00 p.m.	Penn	Sacred Heart	Campus Field • Fairfield, CT		W 31–27	4,503	
^{#}Rankings from STATS Poll. All times are in Eastern Time.

=== Week 5 ===
Date	Time	Visiting team	Home team	Site	TV	Result	Attendance	Ref.
October 12	7:00 p.m.	Holy Cross	Harvard	Harvard Stadium • Boston, MA		W 33–31	10,056	
October 13	12:00 p.m.	Cornell	Colgate	Andy Kerr Stadium • Hamilton, NY (Rivalry)		L 0–31	3,112	
October 13	1:00 p.m.	Brown	No. 25 Princeton	Princeton Stadium • Princeton, NJ		PRIN 48–10	7,320	
October 13	1:00 p.m.	Columbia	Penn	Franklin Field • Philadelphia, PA		PENN 13–10	6,011	
October 13	1:00 p.m.	Mercer	Yale	Yale Bowl • New Haven, CT		W 35–28	2,861	
October 13	6:00 p.m.	Sacred Heart	Dartmouth	Memorial Field • Hanover, NH		W 42–0	3,138	
^{#}Rankings from STATS Poll. All times are in Eastern Time.

=== Week 6 ===
Date	Time	Visiting team	Home team	Site	TV	Result	Attendance	Ref.
October 19	7:00 p.m.	Yale	Penn	Franklin Field • Philadelphia, PA	ESPNU	YALE 23–10	10,126	
October 20	12:00 p.m.	No. 23 Princeton	Harvard	Harvard Stadium • Boston, MA (Rivalry)		PRIN 29–21	10,876	
October 20	1:00 p.m.	Cornell	Brown	Brown Stadium • Providence, RI		COR 34–16	3,886	
October 20†	1:30 p.m.	Dartmouth	Columbia	Wien Stadium • New York City, NY		DART 28–12	12,506	
^{#}Rankings from STATS Poll. All times are in Eastern Time.

=== Week 7 ===
Date	Time	Visiting team	Home team	Site	TV	Result	Attendance	Ref.
October 27	1:00 p.m.	Penn	Brown	Brown Stadium • Providence, RI		PENN 13–7	1,324	
October 27	1:00 p.m.	Yale	Columbia	Wien Stadium • New York City, NY		COL 17–10	2,555	
October 27	1:00 p.m.	Cornell	No. 19 Princeton	Princeton Stadium • Princeton, NJ		PRIN 66–0	4,200	
October 27†	1:30 p.m.	Harvard	Dartmouth	Memorial Field • Hanover, NH (Rivalry)		DART 24–17	5,814	
^{#}Rankings from STATS Poll. All times are in Eastern Time.

=== Week 8 ===
Date	Time	Visiting team	Home team	Site	TV	Result	Attendance	Ref.
November 2	6:00 p.m.	Penn	Cornell	Schoellkopf Field • Ithaca, NY (Trustees' Cup)	ESPNU	PENN 20–7	1,056	
November 3	12:00 p.m.	Columbia	Harvard	Harvard Stadium • Boston, MA		HAR 52–18	10,447	
November 3	1:00 p.m.	Brown	Yale	Yale Bowl • New Haven, CT		YALE 46–16	4,478	
November 3	1:00 p.m.	No. 24 Dartmouth	No. 18 Princeton	Princeton Stadium • Princeton, NJ	NBCS BOS	PRIN 14–9	8,014	
^{#}Rankings from STATS Poll. All times are in Eastern Time.

=== Week 9 ===
Date	Time	Visiting team	Home team	Site	TV	Result	Attendance	Ref.
November 10	12:00 p.m.	Columbia	Brown	Brown Stadium • Providence, RI		COL 42–20	2,118	
November 10	12:30 p.m.	No. 13 Princeton	Yale	Yale Bowl • New Haven, CT (Rivalry)		PRIN 59–43	12,882	
November 10	1:00 p.m.	Harvard	Penn	Franklin Field • Philadelphia, PA		HAR 29–7	13,224	
November 10	1:30 p.m.	No. 25 Dartmouth	Cornell	Schoellkopf Field • Ithaca, NY (Rivalry)		DART 35–24	3,604	
^{#}Rankings from STATS Poll. All times are in Eastern Time.

=== Week 10 ===
Date	Time	Visiting team	Home team	Site	TV	Result	Attendance	Ref.
November 17	12:00 p.m.	Yale	Harvard	Fenway Park • Boston, MA (135th edition of The Game)		HAR 45–27	34,675	
November 17	1:00 p.m.	Cornell	Columbia	Wien Stadium • New York City, NY (Empire State Bowl)		COL 24–21	4,651	
November 17	1:00 p.m.	Penn	No. 11 Princeton	Princeton Stadium • Princeton, NJ (Rivalry)		PRIN 42–14	7,756	
November 17	1:30 p.m.	Brown	No. 20 Dartmouth	Memorial Field • Hanover, NH		DART 49–7	2,575	
^{#}Rankings from STATS Poll. All times are in Eastern Time.

== Attendance ==
Team	Stadium	Capacity	Game 1	Game 2	Game 3	Game 4	Game 5	Total	Average	% of Capacity
Brown	Brown Stadium	20,000	9,309†	3,926	3,886	1,324	2,118	20,563	4,113	20.6%
Columbia	Wien Stadium	17,000	5,327	3,296	12,506†	2,555	4,651	28,335	5,667	33.3%
Cornell	Schoellkopf Field	25,597	12,801†	3,620	8,040	1,056	3,604	29,121	5,824	22.8%
Dartmouth	Memorial Field	11,000	4,815	3,692	3,138	5,814†	2,575	20,034	4,007	36.4%
Harvard	Harvard Stadium	30,323	8,709	9,123	10,056	10,876†	10,447	49,211	9,842	32.5%
Penn	Franklin Field	52,958	5,033	4,445	6,011	10,126	13,224†	38,839	7,768	14.7%
Princeton	Princeton Stadium	27,773	11,068†	1,013	7,320	4,200	8,014	31,615	6,323	22.8%
Yale	Yale Bowl	61,446	7,889	10,176	2,861	4,478	12,882†	38,286	7,657	12.5%
Total	—	246,097	64,951	39,291	53,818	40,429	57,515	256,004	51,201	20.8%

†Season High
