= 2018 Princeton Tigers football team =

American college football season

2018 Princeton Tigers football

Ivy League champion
- Conference: Ivy League

Ranking
- STATS: No. 11
- FCS Coaches: No. 9
- Record: 10–0 (7–0 Ivy)
- Head coach: Bob Surace (9th season)
- Offensive coordinator: Sean Gleeson (2nd season)
- Offensive scheme: Spread option
- Defensive coordinator: Steve Verbit (6th season)
- Base defense: 4–2–5
- Captains: Mark Fossati; Kurt Holuba; Tom Johnson; John "Fish" Lovett
- Home stadium: Powers Field at Princeton Stadium

2018 Ivy League football standings
	Conf.			Overall
Team	W		L	W		L
No. 11 Princeton $	7	–	0	10	–	0
No. 18 Dartmouth	6	–	1	9	–	1
Harvard	4	–	3	6	–	4
Yale	3	–	4	5	–	5
Penn	3	–	4	6	–	4
Columbia	3	–	4	6	–	4
Cornell	2	–	5	3	–	7
Brown	0	–	7	1	–	9
$ – Conference champion; Rankings from STATS Poll

The 2018 Princeton Tigers football team represented Princeton University in the 2018 NCAA Division I FCS football season. They were led by ninth-year head coach Bob Surace and played their home games at Powers Field at Princeton Stadium. Princeton was a member of the Ivy League. They finished the season 10–0 overall and 7–0 in Ivy League play to win the Ivy League title. Princeton averaged 6,561 fans per game.

== Preseason ==
=== Award watch lists ===
Award	Player	Position	Year
Walter Payton Award	John Lovett	QB	SR

== Schedule ==
Date	Time	Opponent	Rank	Site	TV	Result	Attendance
September 15	6:00 p.m.	at Butler*		Bud and Jackie Sellick Bowl; Indianapolis, IN	Facebook Live	W 50–7	4,527
September 22	4:30 p.m.	Monmouth*		Powers Field at Princeton Stadium; Princeton, NJ	ESPN+	W 51–9	11,068
September 28	6:00 p.m.	at Columbia		Robert K. Kraft Field at Lawrence A. Wien Stadium; New York, NY	ESPNU	W 45–10	5,327
October 6	1:00 p.m.	Lehigh*		Powers Field at Princeton Stadium; Princeton, NJ	NBCS PHIL	W 66–7	1,013
October 13	1:00 p.m.	Brown	No. 25	Powers Field at Princeton Stadium; Princeton, NJ	ESPN+	W 48–10	7,320
October 20	12:00 p.m.	at Harvard	No. 23	Harvard Stadium; Boston, MA (rivalry)	ESPN+	W 29–21	10,876
October 27	1:00 p.m.	Cornell	No. 19	Powers Field at Princeton Stadium; Princeton, NJ	ESPN+	W 66–0	4,200
November 3	1:00 p.m.	No. 24 Dartmouth	No. 18	Powers Field at Princeton Stadium; Princeton, NJ	NBCS PHIL+	W 14–9	8,014
November 10	12:30 p.m.	at Yale	No. 13	Yale Bowl; New Haven, CT (rivalry)	ESPN+	W 59–43	12,882
November 17	1:00 p.m.	Penn	No. 11	Powers Field at Princeton Stadium; Princeton, NJ (rivalry)	ESPN+	W 42–14	7,756
*Non-conference game; Rankings from STATS Poll released prior to the game; All times are in Eastern time

== Rankings ==
Ranking movements Legend: ██ Increase in ranking ██ Decrease in ranking — = Not ranked RV = Received votes т = Tied with team above or below
	Week													
Poll	Pre	1	2	3	4	5	6	7	8	9	10	11	12	Final
STATS FCS	—	—	—	RV	RV	RV	25	23	19	18	13	11	10	11
Coaches	—	—	—	RV	25	23	21	18–T	17	14	11	9	10	9

== Game summaries ==
=== At Butler ===
	1	2	3	4	Total
Tigers	17	27	0	6	50
Bulldogs	0	7	0	0	7

=== Monmouth ===
	1	2	3	4	Total
Hawks	9	0	0	0	9
Tigers	14	16	14	7	51

=== At Columbia ===
	1	2	3	4	Total
Tigers	13	17	15	0	45
Lions	3	7	0	0	10

=== Lehigh ===
	1	2	3	4	Total
Mountain Hawks	7	0	0	0	7
Tigers	7	24	21	14	66

=== Brown ===
	1	2	3	4	Total
Bears	0	0	3	7	10
No. 25 Tigers	14	14	7	13	48

=== At Harvard ===
	1	2	3	4	Total
No. 23 Tigers	7	3	0	19	29
Crimson	0	7	0	14	21

=== Cornell ===
	1	2	3	4	Total
Big Red	0	0	0	0	0
No. 19 Tigers	21	24	7	14	66

=== Dartmouth ===
	1	2	3	4	Total
No. 24 Big Green	7	2	0	0	9
No. 18 Tigers	7	0	0	7	14

=== At Yale ===
	1	2	3	4	Total
No. 13 Tigers	21	21	10	7	59
Bulldogs	0	14	14	15	43

=== At Penn ===
	1	2	3	4	Total
Quakers	0	7	7	0	14
No. 11 Tigers	7	14	7	14	42
