= 2018 Penn Quakers football team =

American college football season

2018 Penn Quakers football
- Conference: Ivy League
- Record: 6–4 (3–4 Ivy)
- Head coach: Ray Priore (4th season)
- Offensive coordinator: John Reagan (4th season)
- Offensive scheme: Spread
- Defensive coordinator: Bob Benson (4th season)
- Base defense: 3–3–5
- Home stadium: Franklin Field

2018 Ivy League football standings
	Conf.			Overall
Team	W		L	W		L
No. 11 Princeton $	7	–	0	10	–	0
No. 18 Dartmouth	6	–	1	9	–	1
Harvard	4	–	3	6	–	4
Yale	3	–	4	5	–	5
Penn	3	–	4	6	–	4
Columbia	3	–	4	6	–	4
Cornell	2	–	5	3	–	7
Brown	0	–	7	1	–	9
$ – Conference champion; Rankings from STATS Poll

The 2018 Penn Quakers football team represented the University of Pennsylvania during the 2018 NCAA Division I FCS football season. They were led by fourth-year head coach Ray Priore and played their home games at Franklin Field. They were a member of the Ivy League. They finished the season 6–4 overall 3–3 in Ivy League play to place in a three-way tie for fourth. Penn averaged 7,767 fans per game.

== Preseason ==
=== Award watch lists ===
Award	Player	Position	Year
Buck Buchanan Award	Nick Miller	LB	SR

== Schedule ==
Date	Time	Opponent	Site	TV	Result	Attendance
September 15	3:00 p.m.	Bucknell*	Franklin Field; Philadelphia, PA	ESPN+	W 34–17	5,033
September 22	3:00 p.m.	Lehigh*	Franklin Field; Philadelphia, PA	ESPN+	W 30–10	4,445
September 29	1:30 p.m.	at Dartmouth	Memorial Field; Hanover, NH	ESPN+	L 14–37	3,692
October 6	3:00 p.m.	at Sacred Heart*	Campus Field; Fairfield, CT		W 31–27	4,503
October 13	1:00 p.m.	Columbia	Franklin Field; Philadelphia, PA	ESPN+	W 13–10	6,011
October 19	7:00 p.m.	Yale	Franklin Field; Philadelphia, PA	ESPNU	L 10–23	10,126
October 27	1:00 p.m.	at Brown	Brown Stadium; Providence, RI	ESPN+	W 13–7	1,324
November 2	6:00 p.m.	at Cornell	Schoellkopf Field; Ithaca, NY (place)	ESPNU	W 20–7	1,056
November 10	1:00 p.m.	Harvard^{†}	Franklin Field; Philadelphia, PA (rivalry)	ESPN+	L 7–29	13,224
November 17	1:00 p.m.	at No. 11 Princeton	Powers Field at Princeton Stadium; Princeton, NJ (rivalry)	ESPN+	L 14–42	7,756
*Non-conference game; ^{†}Homecoming; Rankings from STATS Poll released prior to the game; All times are in Eastern time

== Game summaries ==
=== Bucknell ===
	1	2	3	4	Total
Bison	3	7	7	0	17
Quakers	17	10	0	7	34

=== Lehigh ===
	1	2	3	4	Total
Mountain Hawks	0	10	0	0	10
Quakers	0	13	7	10	30

=== At Dartmouth ===
	1	2	3	4	Total
Quakers	0	7	0	7	14
Big Green	7	6	21	3	37

=== At Sacred Heart ===
	1	2	3	4	Total
Quakers	7	10	7	7	31
Pioneers	0	0	21	6	27

=== Columbia ===
	1	2	3	4	Total
Lions	0	0	10	0	10
Quakers	3	3	0	7	13

=== Yale ===
	1	2	3	4	Total
Bulldogs	15	6	2	0	23
Quakers	3	0	7	0	10

=== At Brown ===
	1	2	3	4	Total
Quakers	3	10	0	0	13
Bears	0	0	0	7	7

=== At Cornell ===
	1	2	3	4	Total
Quakers	0	3	7	10	20
Big Red	0	7	0	0	7

=== Harvard ===
	1	2	3	4	Total
Crimson	10	6	13	0	29
Quakers	0	0	0	7	7

=== At Princeton ===
	1	2	3	4	Total
Quakers	0	7	7	0	14
No. 11 Tigers	7	14	7	14	42

== Roster ==
2018 Penn Quakers football team roster
Players
Coaches
Offense

Pos.	#	Name	Class
QB	1	Ryan Glover	So
WR	3	Mac Humble	So
WR	4	Darnell Fleury	Fr
QB	6	John Quinnelly	Fr
WR	7	Christian Pearson	Sr
QB	8	Nick Robinson	Jr
WR	9	Justin Morrison	Sr
WR	10	Kolton Huber	Jr
WR	11	Tyler Herrick	Jr
TE	12	Sire Woods	So
QB	13	Mason Quandt	Fr
WR	14	Rory Jr. Starkey	Fr
TE	15	Gavin Geib	So
WR	17	Trevor Cefalu	Sr
WR	19	Steve Farrell	Sr
RB	21	Abe Willows	Jr
RB	23	Trey Flowers	Fr
RB	25	Garrett Morris	Fr
RB	27	Dante' Moore	Jr
RB	30	Karekin Brooks	Jr
RB	32	Isaiah Malcome	So
OL	52	Cameron Landis	Fr
OL	56	Jeff Gibbs	Jr
OL	57	Travis Wang	Fr
OL	61	Quinn Hudak	Sr
OL	62	Vince Oliver	Fr
OL	63	Tommy Dennis	Sr
OL	64	Travis Spreen	Fr
OL	66	Joe Basiura	Fr
OL	67	William Long	So
OL	70	Ben Padon	So
OL	71	Greg Begnoche	Jr
OL	72	Ace Escobedo	Jr
OL	74	Johnathan Gessner	So
OL	75	Nate Miller	So
OL	76	Dan Beaver	So
OL	77	Sean Boles	Fr
TE	80	Logan Sharp	Sr
WR	81	Mike Akai	Sr
WR	83	Chaz Augustini	Sr
WR	84	Niko Rice	So
WR	85	Lewis Gibson	So
TE	86	Christopher Mottillo	Fr
TE	87	Matt Norton	Jr
TE	88	Nick Shablom	Jr
WR	89	Ryan Cragun	Fr

Defense

Pos.	#	Name	Class
DB	2	Jared Noble	So
LB	3	Nico Ament	Sr
LB	4	Jay Jr. Cammon	Sr
DB	5	Eric Markes	Jr
DB	6	Jyron Walker	Sr
DB	7	Winston Britton	So
LB	8	Hunter Hayes	Jr
LB	9	Shane Sweitzer	Fr
DB	13	Ian Ude	So
DB	14	Sam Philippi	Sr
DB	16	Malcolm Strickland	Fr
DB	17	Hassan Smith	Sr
DB	18	Keegan Otte	So
DB	19	Khalil Weathers	Fr
DB	20	Jacob Martin	Jr
DB	21	Justin Sands	Fr
LB	23	Zach Evans	Jr
DB	24	Anthony Lotti	So
DB	25	Austin Cooper	Jr
DB	26	Mohammed Diakite	Fr
DB	27	Riley O'Brien	So
DB	28	Tayte Doddy	Jr
LB	29	James McCarthy	So
DL	31	Benji Mowatt	So
DB	32	Conor O'Brien	Jr
LB	33	Tanner Long	Fr
LB	34	Patrick McGettigan	So
LB	36	Adam Conyer	Fr
DB	37	Jason Jr. McCleod	Fr
LB	38	Michael Rolfe	Jr
DB	40	Luke Bullock	Sr
LB	42	Brendan O'Hara	Jr
LB	43	Sebastian Sanchez	Jr
LB	45	Jake Heimlicher	Fr
LB	47	Nick Miller	Sr
DL	48	Matthew McElroy	Fr
LB	49	Connor Jangro	Jr
LB	51	Sean Pahls	Jr
DL	52	Choyce Bostian III	Jr
DL	53	Taheeb Sonekan	Jr
DL	54	Cortez Alston	So
LB	55	Pat McInerney	Sr
DL	58	Trevor Radosevich	Fr
LB	59	Brian O'Neill	So
DL	78	Prince Emili	Jr
DL	79	Brian Bond	So
DL	83	Kailash Graham-Bell	Jr
DL	90	Kevin Cadigan	Sr
DL	91	Evan Carp	So
LB	92	Mark Evanchick	Jr
DL	96	David Ryslik	So
DL	97	Mike Rodriguez	So
DL	98	Brody Graham	Sr
DL	99	Cooper Gardner	Sr

Special teams

Pos.	#	Name	Class
K	16	David Perkins	So
K	30	Jack Soslow	Sr
LS	82	Carson Vey	Sr
K	93	Drew Brennan	Jr
K	94	Daniel Karrash	Fr
P	95	Jake Haggard	Fr

Head coach

- Ray Priore

Coordinators/assistant coaches

Legend

- (C) Team captain
- (S) Suspended
- (I) Ineligible
- Injured
- Redshirt

Roster
