= 2018 Cornell Big Red football team =

American college football season

2018 Cornell Big Red football

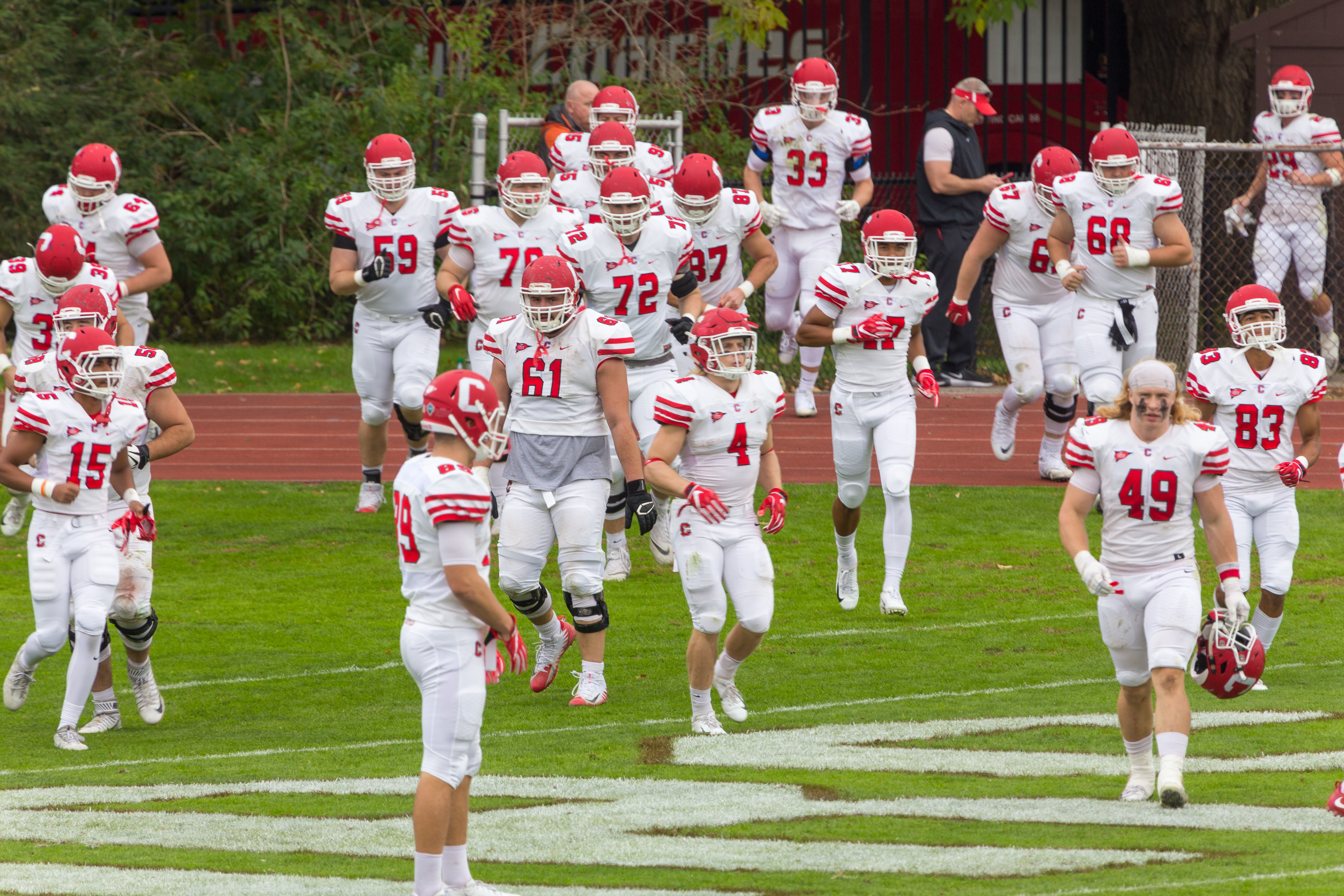
- 2018 Cornell players in their "away" uniforms
- Conference: Ivy League
- Record: 3–7 (2–5 Ivy)
- Head coach: David Archer (6th season)
- Offensive coordinator: Joe Villapiano (2nd season)
- Defensive coordinator: Jared Backus (6th season)
- Captains: J. Edward Keating; Reis Seggebruch
- Home stadium: Schoellkopf Field

Uniform
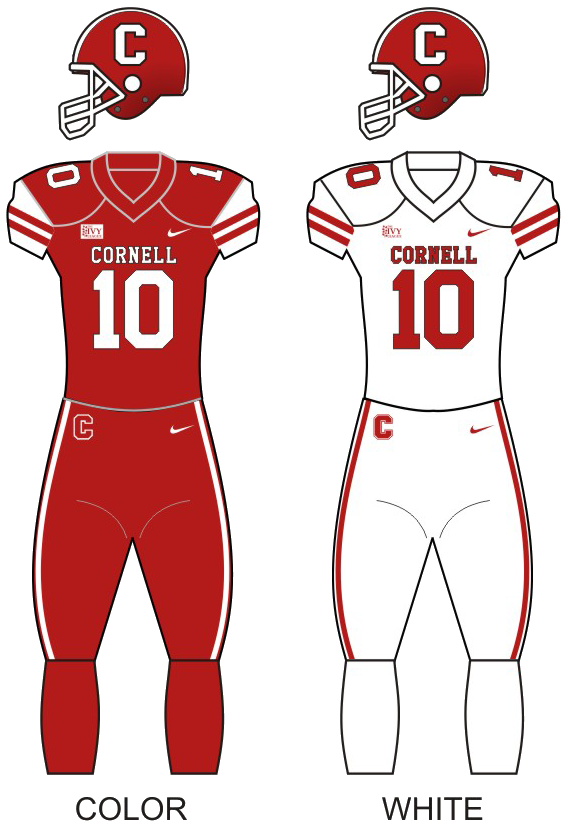

2018 Ivy League football standings
| | Conf. | | | Overall |
| Team | W | | L | W | | L |
|---|---|---|---|---|---|---|
| No. 11 Princeton $ | 7 | – | 0 | 10 | – | 0 |
| No. 18 Dartmouth | 6 | – | 1 | 9 | – | 1 |
| Harvard | 4 | – | 3 | 6 | – | 4 |
| Yale | 3 | – | 4 | 5 | – | 5 |
| Penn | 3 | – | 4 | 6 | – | 4 |
| Columbia | 3 | – | 4 | 6 | – | 4 |
| Cornell | 2 | – | 5 | 3 | – | 7 |
| Brown | 0 | – | 7 | 1 | – | 9 |
$ – Conference champion; Rankings from STATS Poll

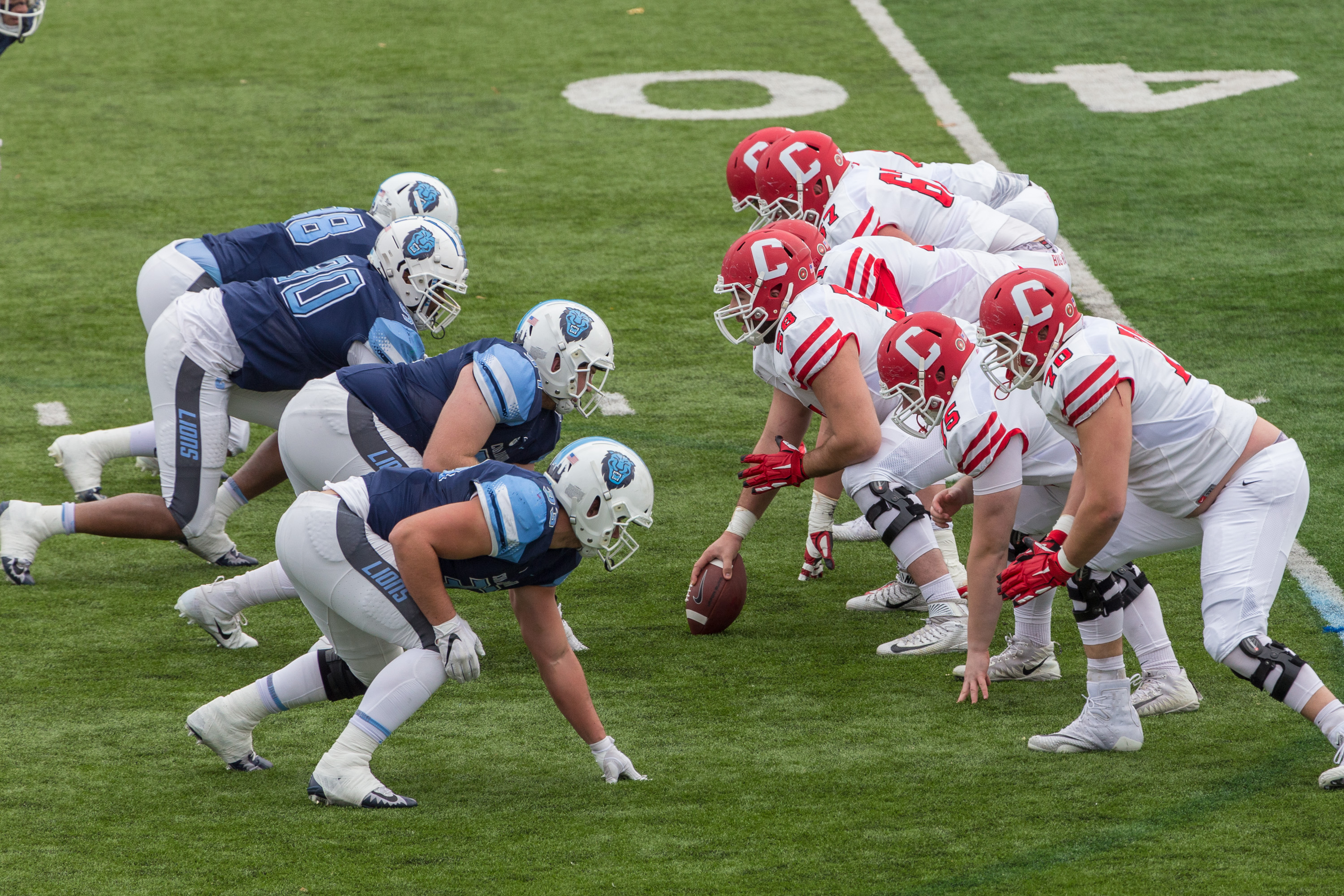
Cornell vs Columbia Lions at Wien Stadium, November 17

The 2018 Cornell Big Red football team represented Cornell University in the 2018 NCAA Division I FCS football season as a member of the Ivy League. They were led by sixth-year head coach David Archer and played their home games at Schoellkopf Field. Cornell finished the season 3–7 overall 2–5 in Ivy League play to place seventh. Cornell averaged 6,601 fans per game.

== Schedule ==
The 2018 schedule consisted of five home and five away games. The Big Red hosted Ivy League foes Yale, Harvard, Penn, and Dartmouth, and traveled to Brown, Princeton, and Columbia.

In 2018, Cornell's non-conference opponents were Delaware of the Colonial Athletic Association, Sacred Heart of the Northeast Conference, and Colgate of the Patriot League. Homecoming coincided with the home opener against Yale on September 22.

Cornell's 66–0 loss to Princeton on October 27 was its worst defeat since a 77–0 defeat by Harvard in 1890, 128 years earlier.

| Date | Time | Opponent | Site | TV | Result | Attendance |
|---|---|---|---|---|---|---|
| September 15 | 3:30 p.m. | at Delaware* | Delaware Stadium; Newark, DE | BHAA | L 10–27 | 14,511 |
| September 22 | 3:00 p.m. | Yale^{†} | Schoellkopf Field; Ithaca, NY | ESPN+ | L 24–30 | 12,801 |
| September 29 | 1:30 p.m. | Sacred Heart* | Schoellkopf Field; Ithaca, NY | ESPN+ | W 43–24 | 3,620 |
| October 6 | 1:30 p.m. | Harvard | Schoellkopf Field; Ithaca, NY | ESPN+ | W 28–24 | 8,040 |
| October 13 | 12:00 p.m. | at No. 20 Colgate* | Crown Field at Andy Kerr Stadium; Hamilton, NY (rivalry) | PL Net | L 0–31 | 3,112 |
| October 20 | 1:00 p.m. | at Brown | Brown Stadium; Providence, RI | ESPN+ | W 34–16 | 3,886 |
| October 27 | 1:00 p.m. | at No. 19 Princeton | Powers Field at Princeton Stadium; Princeton, NJ | ESPN+ | L 0–66 | 4,200 |
| November 2 | 6:00 p.m. | Penn | Schoellkopf Field; Ithaca, NY (rivalry) | ESPNU | L 7–20 | 1,056 |
| November 10 | 1:30 p.m. | No. 25 Dartmouth | Schoellkopf Field; Ithaca, NY (rivalry) | ESPN+ | L 24–35 | 3,604 |
| November 17 | 1:00 p.m. | at Columbia | Robert K. Kraft Field at Lawrence A. Wien Stadium; New York, NY (rivalry) | ESPN+ | L 21–24 | 4,651 |
*Non-conference game; ^{†}Homecoming; Rankings from STATS Poll released prior to the game; All times are in Eastern time

== Game summaries ==
=== At Delaware ===
| | 1 | 2 | 3 | 4 | Total |
|---|---|---|---|---|---|
| Big Red | 3 | 0 | 0 | 7 | 10 |
| Fightin' Blue Hens | 7 | 7 | 0 | 13 | 27 |

=== Yale ===
| | 1 | 2 | 3 | 4 | Total |
|---|---|---|---|---|---|
| Bulldogs | 14 | 3 | 6 | 7 | 30 |
| Big Red | 14 | 0 | 0 | 10 | 24 |

=== Sacred Heart ===
| | 1 | 2 | 3 | 4 | Total |
|---|---|---|---|---|---|
| Pioneers | 3 | 7 | 7 | 7 | 24 |
| Big Red | 16 | 20 | 7 | 0 | 43 |

=== Harvard ===
| | 1 | 2 | 3 | 4 | Total |
|---|---|---|---|---|---|
| Crimson | 7 | 0 | 10 | 7 | 24 |
| Big Red | 0 | 7 | 7 | 14 | 28 |

=== At Colgate ===
| | 1 | 2 | 3 | 4 | Total |
|---|---|---|---|---|---|
| Big Red | 0 | 0 | 0 | 0 | 0 |
| No. 20 Raiders | 7 | 3 | 14 | 7 | 31 |

=== At Brown ===
| | 1 | 2 | 3 | 4 | Total |
|---|---|---|---|---|---|
| Big Red | 0 | 14 | 7 | 13 | 34 |
| Bears | 0 | 10 | 0 | 6 | 16 |

=== At Princeton ===
| | 1 | 2 | 3 | 4 | Total |
|---|---|---|---|---|---|
| Big Red | 0 | 0 | 0 | 0 | 0 |
| No. 19 Tigers | 21 | 24 | 7 | 14 | 66 |

=== Penn ===
| | 1 | 2 | 3 | 4 | Total |
|---|---|---|---|---|---|
| Quakers | 0 | 3 | 7 | 10 | 20 |
| Big Red | 0 | 7 | 0 | 0 | 7 |

=== Dartmouth ===
| | 1 | 2 | 3 | 4 | Total |
|---|---|---|---|---|---|
| No. 25 Big Green | 21 | 0 | 14 | 0 | 35 |
| Big Red | 0 | 17 | 0 | 7 | 24 |

=== At Columbia ===
| | 1 | 2 | 3 | 4 | Total |
|---|---|---|---|---|---|
| Big Red | 0 | 7 | 0 | 14 | 21 |
| Lions | 10 | 0 | 0 | 14 | 24 |
