= 2018 Yale Bulldogs football team =

American college football season

2018 Yale Bulldogs football
- Conference: Ivy League
- Record: 5–5 (3–4 Ivy)
- Head coach: Tony Reno (7th season)
- Offensive coordinator: Kevin Cahill (1st season)
- Offensive scheme: Pro spread
- Defensive coordinator: Sean McGowan (2nd season)
- Base defense: 4–2–5
- Home stadium: Yale Bowl

2018 Ivy League football standings
	Conf.			Overall
Team	W		L	W		L
No. 11 Princeton $	7	–	0	10	–	0
No. 18 Dartmouth	6	–	1	9	–	1
Harvard	4	–	3	6	–	4
Yale	3	–	4	5	–	5
Penn	3	–	4	6	–	4
Columbia	3	–	4	6	–	4
Cornell	2	–	5	3	–	7
Brown	0	–	7	1	–	9
$ – Conference champion; Rankings from STATS Poll

The 2018 Yale Bulldogs football team represented Yale University in the 2018 NCAA Division I FCS football season. The season marked the Bulldogs's 146th overall season. The team played its home games at Yale Bowl in New Haven, Connecticut and were led by seventh-year head coach Tony Reno. They were members of the Ivy League. They finished the season 5–5 overall and 3–4 in Ivy League play to place in three-way tie for fourth. Yale averaged 7,657 fans per game.

== Preseason ==
=== Award watch lists ===
Award	Player	Position	Year
Walter Payton Award	Zane Dudek	RB	SO

== Schedule ==
Date	Time	Opponent	Site	TV	Result	Attendance
September 15	1:00 p.m.	at Holy Cross*	Fitton Field; Worcester, MA		L 28–31 ^{OT}	7,397
September 22	3:00 p.m.	at Cornell	Schoellkopf Field; Ithaca, NY		W 30–24	12,801
September 29	1:00 p.m.	No. 16 Maine*	Yale Bowl; New Haven, CT	ESPN+	W 35–14	7,889
October 5	6:00 p.m.	Dartmouth	Yale Bowl; New Haven, CT	ESPNU	L 18–41	10,176
October 13	1:00 p.m.	Mercer*	Yale Bowl; New Haven, CT	ESPN+	W 35–28	2,861
October 19	7:00 p.m.	at Penn	Franklin Field; Philadelphia, PA	ESPNU	W 23–10	10,126
October 27	1:00 p.m.	at Columbia	Robert K. Kraft Field at Lawrence A. Wien Stadium; New York, NY	ESPN+	L 10–17	2,555
November 3	1:00 p.m.	Brown	Yale Bowl; New Haven, CT	ESPN+	W 46–16	4,478
November 10	12:30 p.m.	No. 13 Princeton	Yale Bowl; New Haven, CT (rivalry)	ESPN+	L 43–59	12,882
November 17	Noon	vs. Harvard	Fenway Park; Boston, MA (rivalry)	ESPN2	L 27–45	34,675
*Non-conference game; Rankings from STATS Poll released prior to the game; All times are in Eastern time

== Game summaries ==
=== At Holy Cross ===
	1	2	3	4	OT	Total
Bulldogs	21	7	0	0	0	28
Crusaders	14	0	0	14	3	31

=== At Cornell ===
	1	2	3	4	Total
Bulldogs	14	3	6	7	30
Big Red	14	0	0	10	24

=== Maine ===
	1	2	3	4	Total
No. 16 Black Bears	0	0	7	7	14
Bulldogs	7	7	14	7	35

=== Dartmouth ===
	1	2	3	4	Total
Big Green	13	14	7	7	41
Bulldogs	7	3	0	8	18

=== Mercer ===
	1	2	3	4	Total
Bears	0	14	7	7	28
Bulldogs	14	14	0	7	35

=== At Penn ===
	1	2	3	4	Total
Bulldogs	15	6	2	0	23
Quakers	3	0	7	0	10

=== At Columbia ===
	1	2	3	4	Total
Bulldogs	0	10	0	0	10
Lions	3	0	7	7	17

=== Brown ===
	1	2	3	4	Total
Bears	0	3	6	7	16
Bulldogs	14	6	13	13	46

=== Princeton ===
	1	2	3	4	Total
No. 13 Tigers	21	21	10	7	59
Bulldogs	0	14	14	15	43

=== Vs. Harvard ===
	1	2	3	4	Total
Bulldogs	7	7	10	3	27
Crimson	7	14	7	17	45

== Roster ==
2018 Yale Bulldogs football team roster
Players
Coaches
Offense

Pos.	#	Name	Class
RB	1	Trenton Charles	Fr
WR	4	Darrion Carrington	So
RB	5	Alan Lamar	Jr
QB	6	Kurt Rawlings	Jr
WR	7	Melvin Rouse II	So
QB	8	Patrick Conte	So
RB	9	Michael Purvey Jr.	So
WR	11	Caden Herring	Jr
WR	12	Jamal Locke	Sr
WR	13	Keith CJ McCord II	Sr
WR	14	Reed Klubnik	Jr
QB	15	Nick Henkel	Fr
QB	16	Griffin O'Connor	Fr
WR	17	Seun Omonije	Fr
QB	19	Jimmy Check	So
WR	20	Jack Biestek	Fr
RB	21	Kamsi Nwangwu	Sr
RB	22	Elliott McElwain	Fr
WR	23	Noah Aaron	Fr
RB	24	Spencer Alston	Fr
RB	29	Daniel Debner	Sr
RB	33	Zane Dudek	So
RB	35	Kyle Ellerson	Sr
TE	44	Sasha Hoban	So
OL	55	Jacob Hinish	So
OL	57	Cubby Schuller	Fr
OL	65	Josh De St. Jean	Fr
OL	66	Nick Gargiulo	Fr
OL	67	Jacob Van de Grift	Sr
OL	68	Grant Neagli	So
OL	70	Rees LeMay	Sr
OL	71	Tyler Jost	So
OL	72	Dieter Eiselen	Jr
OL	73	Lucas Tribble	Jr
OL	74	Sterling Strother	Jr
OL	75	Cameron Warfield	So
OL	76	Jack Lee	Sr
OL	77	Jett Sexton	Jr
OL	78	Steven Cepalia	Jr
OL	79	Conor Smith	Fr
TE	80	J. J. Howland	So
WR	81	Kyle Marcinick	Sr
WR	82	Jaylan Sandifer	Fr
WR	83	Garrett White	Jr
TE	84	Garry Raymond	Fr
TE	85	Quinn Dawson	Jr
TE	86	John Lager	Sr
WR	88	JP Shohfi	Jr
TE	89	D. Major Roman	So

Defense

Pos.	#	Name	Class
DB	1	Malcolm Dixon	Jr
DB	2	Marquise Peggs	Sr
DB	3	Brian Abraham	Fr
DB	4	Jaylan Granberry	Fr
DB	5	Miles Oldacre	Fr
DB	6	Jaelin Alburg	Jr
LB	8	Brendan MacPhee	Jr
DE	9	Osorachukwu Ifesinachukwu	Fr
LB	10	Tré Moore	Sr
LB	13	Jack Westafer	Jr
LB	15	Jordan Carey	So
DE	16	Reid Nickerson	Fr
DB	17	Kennedy Kosmalski	Fr
LB	18	Ryan Burke	Jr
DB	20	Tosan Agbeyegbe	Jr
DB	21	Deonte Henson	So
DB	23	Isaiah Dunham	Fr
DL	24	Joshua Keeler	Jr
LB	25	Micah Awodiran	So
DB	26	Rodney Thomas II	So
LB	27	Jarett Balter	Sr
DE	28	Christian Sampleton	So
LB	30	Noah Pope	Fr
DB	31	Kyle Ellis	Fr
DB	32	Henry Segel	Jr
DE	34	Brett Gerber	Fr
LB	35	Alexander Abelite	Jr
DE	36	J. Hunter Roman	Sr
DB	37	Dathan Hickey	Fr
LB	40	Blake Hill	So
LB	41	A. J. Ryan	So
LB	42	Quintin Herbert	Sr
LB	43	John Dean	So
DB	44	Scott Patton	Sr
LB	47	Shane Frommer	Fr
DT	50	Spencer Matthaei	Jr
DL	52	Michael Chime	So
LB	53	Christopher Maxwell	Sr
DL	54	Julian Fraser	Jr
DL	56	Daniel James	Sr
DE	87	Devin Moore	Jr
DL	90	Adam Raine	Fr
DL	91	Nicholas Crowle	Sr
DE	92	Charles Callender	Jr
DE	94	Sean Kissel	Jr
DL	96	Sebastian Bruno	Fr
LB	97	Henry Large	Fr
DL	99	Tate Goodyear	Fr

Special teams

Pos.	#	Name	Class
K, P	12	Ajay Culhane	Fr
LS	42	Nick Tibbetts	Fr
K, P	49	Sam Tuckerman	Jr
LS	51	Ryan Oak	Sr
LS	59	Hunter Simino	Sr
K, P	81	Alex Galland	Sr
PK	97	Blake Horn	Sr

Head coach

- Tony Reno

Coordinators/assistant coaches

Legend

- (C) Team captain
- (S) Suspended
- (I) Ineligible
- Injured
- Redshirt

Roster
