= 2018 Harvard Crimson football team =

American college football season

2018 Harvard Crimson football
- Conference: Ivy League
- Record: 6–4 (4–3 Ivy)
- Head coach: Tim Murphy (25th season)
- Offensive coordinator: Joel Lamb (13th season)
- Offensive scheme: Spread
- Defensive coordinator: Scott Larkee (10th season)
- Base defense: 4–3
- Home stadium: Harvard Stadium

2018 Ivy League football standings
	Conf.			Overall
Team	W		L	W		L
No. 11 Princeton $	7	–	0	10	–	0
No. 18 Dartmouth	6	–	1	9	–	1
Harvard	4	–	3	6	–	4
Yale	3	–	4	5	–	5
Penn	3	–	4	6	–	4
Columbia	3	–	4	6	–	4
Cornell	2	–	5	3	–	7
Brown	0	–	7	1	–	9
$ – Conference champion; Rankings from STATS Poll

The 2018 Harvard Crimson football team represented Harvard University during the 2018 NCAA Division I FCS football season as a member of the Ivy League. They were led by 25th-year head coach Tim Murphy and played their home games at Harvard Stadium. They finished the season 6–4 overall and 4–3 in Ivy League play to place third. Harvard averaged 13,981 fans per game during the season.

== Schedule ==
The 2018 schedule consisted of six home games and four away games. The Crimson hosted Ivy League foes Princeton, Columbia, and Yale for the 135th edition of Harvard–Yale football rivalry, and traveled to Brown, Cornell, Dartmouth, and Penn. Harvard's non-conference opponents were San Diego of the Pioneer Football League, Rhode Island of the Colonial Athletic Association, and Holy Cross of the Patriot League.

Date	Time	Opponent	Site	TV	Result	Attendance
September 15	12:00 p.m.	San Diego*	Harvard Stadium; Boston, MA	ESPN+	W 36–14	8,709
September 21	7:00 p.m.	at Brown	Brown Stadium; Providence, RI	ESPNU	W 31–17	9,309
September 28	7:00 p.m.	No. 22 Rhode Island*	Harvard Stadium; Boston, MA	ESPN+	L 16–23	9,123
October 6	1:30 p.m.	at Cornell	Schoellkopf Field; Ithaca, NY	ESPN+	L 24–28	8,040
October 12	7:00 p.m.	Holy Cross*	Harvard Stadium; Boston, MA	ESPN+	W 33–31	10,056
October 20	12:00 p.m.	No. 23 Princeton	Harvard Stadium; Boston, MA (rivalry)	ESPN+	L 21–29	10,876
October 27	1:30 p.m.	at Dartmouth	Memorial Field; Hanover, NH (rivalry)	ESPN+	L 17-24	5,814
November 3	12:00 p.m.	Columbia	Harvard Stadium; Boston, MA	ESPN+/NESN	W 52–18	10,447
November 10	1:00 p.m.	at Penn	Franklin Field; Philadelphia, PA (rivalry)	ESPN+	W 29-7	13,224
November 17	12:00 p.m.	vs. Yale	Fenway Park; Boston, MA (rivalry)	ESPN2	W 45–27	34,675
*Non-conference game; Rankings from STATS Poll released prior to the game; All times are in Eastern time

== Game summaries ==
=== San Diego ===
	1	2	3	4	Total
Toreros	3	3	8	0	14
Crimson	27	0	3	6	36

=== At Brown ===
	1	2	3	4	Total
Crimson	14	10	0	7	31
Bears	3	0	7	7	17

=== Rhode Island ===
	1	2	3	4	Total
No. 22 Rams	2	14	7	0	23
Crimson	3	0	6	7	16

=== At Cornell ===
	1	2	3	4	Total
Crimson	7	0	10	7	24
Big Red	0	7	7	14	28

=== Holy Cross ===
	1	2	3	4	Total
Crusaders	0	7	7	17	31
Crimson	9	11	10	3	33

=== Princeton ===
	1	2	3	4	Total
No. 23 Tigers	7	3	0	19	29
Crimson	0	7	0	14	21

=== At Dartmouth ===
	1	2	3	4	Total
Crimson	0	0	7	10	17
Big Green	14	7	0	3	24

=== Columbia ===
	1	2	3	4	Total
Lions	6	6	0	6	18
Crimson	21	7	7	17	52

=== At Penn ===
	1	2	3	4	Total
Crimson	10	6	13	0	29
Quakers	0	0	0	7	7

=== Vs. Yale ===
	1	2	3	4	Total
Bulldogs	7	7	10	3	27
Crimson	7	14	7	17	45
