= 2018 Brown Bears football team =

American college football season

2018 Brown Bears football

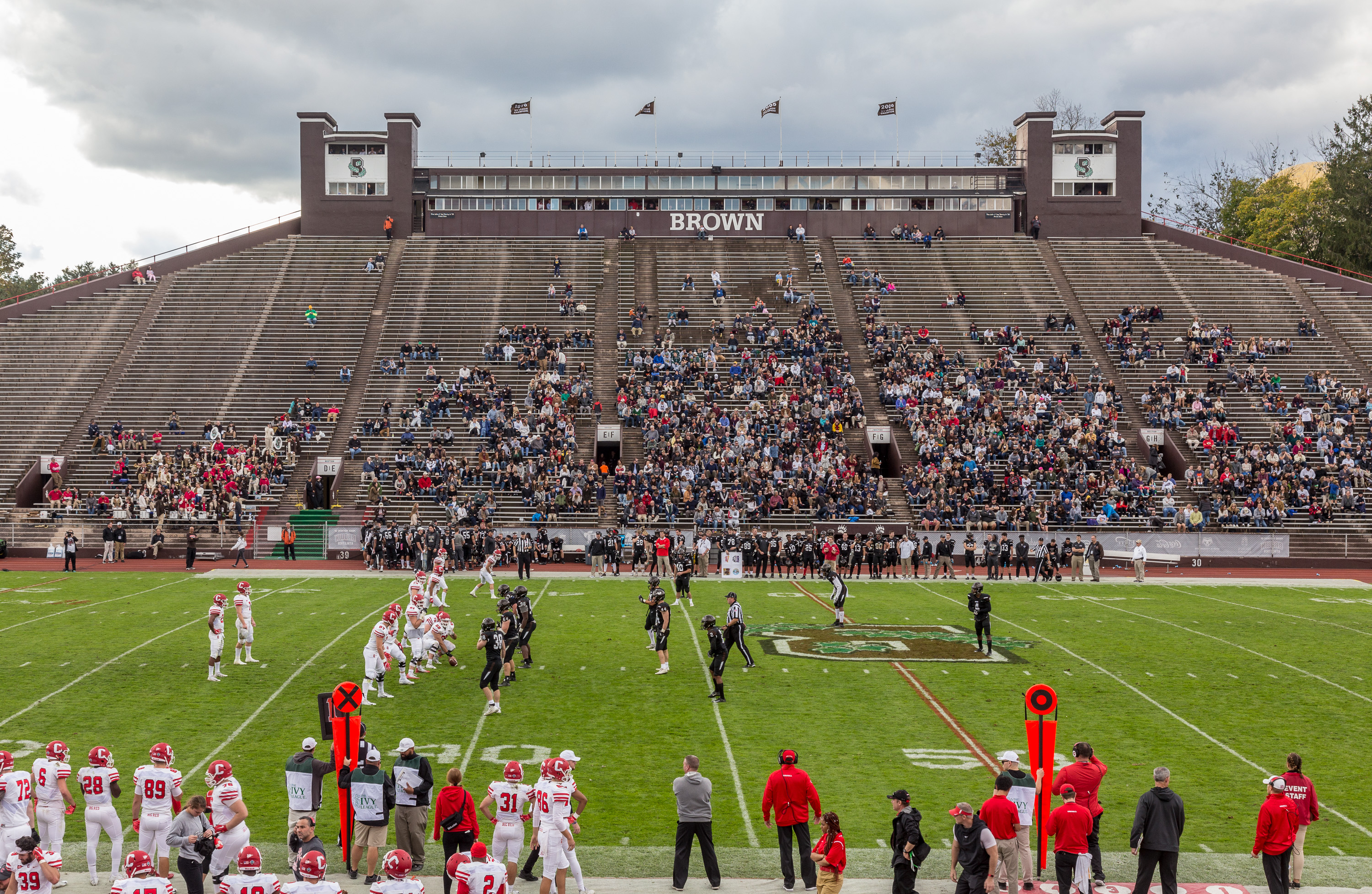
- Brown hosted Cornell on October 20
- Conference: Ivy League
- Record: 1–9 (0–7 Ivy)
- Head coach: Phil Estes (21st season)
- Offensive coordinator: Kevin Decker (1st season)
- Offensive scheme: Veer and shoot
- Defensive coordinator: Michael Kelleher (18th season)
- Base defense: 3–4
- Home stadium: Brown Stadium

2018 Ivy League football standings
	Conf.			Overall
Team	W		L	W		L
No. 11 Princeton $	7	–	0	10	–	0
No. 18 Dartmouth	6	–	1	9	–	1
Harvard	4	–	3	6	–	4
Yale	3	–	4	5	–	5
Penn	3	–	4	6	–	4
Columbia	3	–	4	6	–	4
Cornell	2	–	5	3	–	7
Brown	0	–	7	1	–	9
$ – Conference champion; Rankings from STATS Poll

The 2018 Brown Bears football team represented Brown University as a member of the Ivy League of the 2018 NCAA Division I FCS football season. Led Phil Estes in his 21st and final season as head coach, the Bears compiled an overall record of 1–9 with a mark of 0–7 in conference play, placing last out of eight teams in the Ivy League. Brown played home games at Brown Stadium in Providence, Rhode Island.

On November 19, Estes announced his resignation. He finished his tenure at Brown with an overall record of 115–94.

== Schedule ==
The 2018 schedule consisted of five home games and five away games.

Date	Time	Opponent	Site	TV	Result	Attendance
September 14	10:00 pm	at Cal Poly*	Alex G. Spanos Stadium; San Luis Obispo, CA	Pluto TV 244	L 15–44	7,725
September 21	7:00 pm	Harvard	Brown Stadium; Providence, RI	ESPNU	L 17–31	9,309
September 29	1:00 pm	Georgetown*	Brown Stadium; Providence, RI	NESN TD, ESPN+	W 35–7	3,926
October 6	1:00 pm	at No. 18 Rhode Island*	Meade Stadium; Kingston RI (rivalry)		L 0–48	6,141
October 13	1:00 pm	at No. 25 Princeton	Powers Field at Princeton Stadium; Princeton, NJ	ESPN+	L 10–48	7,320
October 20	1:00 pm	Cornell	Brown Stadium; Providence, RI	NESN TD, ESPN+	L 16–34	3,886
October 27	1:00 pm	Penn	Brown Stadium; Providence, RI	NESN+, ESPN+	L 7–13	1,324
November 3	1:00 pm	at Yale	Yale Bowl; New Haven, CT	ESPN+	L 16–46	4,478
November 10	12:30 pm	Columbia	Brown Stadium; Providence, RI	NESN+, ESPN+	L 20–42	2,118
November 17	1:30 pm	at No. 20 Dartmouth	Memorial Field; Hanover, NH	ESPN+	L 7–49	2,575
*Non-conference game; Rankings from STATS Poll released prior to the game; All times are in Eastern time

== Game summaries ==
=== At Cal Poly ===
	1	2	3	4	Total
Bears	0	15	0	0	15
Mustangs	3	21	13	7	44

Statistics	BRWN	CP
First downs	17	24
Total yards	405	499
Rushing yards	93	420
Passing yards	312	79
Turnovers	1	2
Time of possession	27:07	32:53

Team	Category	Player	Statistics
Brown	Passing	Michael McGovern	25/50, 312 yards, INT
Brown	Rushing	Scott Boylan	6 rushes, 47 yards, TD
Brown	Receiving	Jakob Prall	4 receptions, 62 yards
Cal Poly	Passing	Khaleel Jenkins	5/9, 81 yards
Cal Poly	Rushing	Joe Protheroe	43 rushes, 228 yards, 3 TD
Cal Poly	Receiving	J. J. Koski	3 receptions, 56 yards

=== Harvard ===
	1	2	3	4	Total
Crimson	14	10	0	7	31
Bears	3	0	7	7	17

Statistics	HARV	BRWN
First downs	24	13
Total yards	488	325
Rushing yards	237	32
Passing yards	251	293
Turnovers	2	2
Time of possession	33:48	23:48

Team	Category	Player	Statistics
Harvard	Passing	Jake Smith	23/30, 251 yards, 2 TD, 2 INT
Harvard	Rushing	Aaron Shampklin	15 rushes, 93 yards
Harvard	Receiving	Adam Scott	8 receptions, 90 yards, TD
Brown	Passing	Michael McGovern	22/43, 293 yards, 2 TD, 2 INT
Brown	Rushing	Allen Smith	5 rushes, 20 yards
Brown	Receiving	Jakob Prall	3 receptions, 120 yards

=== Georgetown ===
	1	2	3	4	Total
Hoyas	0	0	7	0	7
Bears	14	7	7	7	35

Statistics	GTWN	BRWN
First downs	17	20
Total yards	321	369
Rushing yards	248	100
Passing yards	73	269
Turnovers	3	0
Time of possession	29:02	30:58

Team	Category	Player	Statistics
Georgetown	Passing	Gunther Johnson	11/29, 73 yards, INT
Georgetown	Rushing	Jackson Saffold	16 rushes, 82 yards
Georgetown	Receiving	Winston Jackson Jr.	2 receptions, 30 yards
Brown	Passing	Michael McGovern	23/42, 269 yards, TD
Brown	Rushing	Michael McGovern	11 rushes, 53 yards, TD
Brown	Receiving	Jaelon Blandburg	5 receptions, 69 yards

=== At No. 18 Rhode Island ===
	1	2	3	4	Total
Bears	0	0	0	0	0
No. 18 Rams	3	24	14	7	48

Statistics	BRWN	RI
First downs	8	26
Total yards	127	580
Rushing yards	26	229
Passing yards	101	351
Turnovers	1	2
Time of possession	21:47	38:13

Team	Category	Player	Statistics
Brown	Passing	Michael McGovern	11/27, 101 yards, INT
Brown	Rushing	Andrew Bolton	5 rushes, 15 yards
Brown	Receiving	Chima Amushie	1 reception, 23 yards
Rhode Island	Passing	Vito Priore	19/25, 310 yards, 4 TD
Rhode Island	Rushing	Lorenzo Bryant Jr.	15 rushes, 92 yards
Rhode Island	Receiving	Aaron Parker	6 receptions, 108 yards, 2 TD

=== At No. 25 Princeton ===
	1	2	3	4	Total
Bears	0	0	3	7	10
No. 25 Tigers	14	14	7	13	48

Statistics	BRWN	PRIN
First downs	15	27
Total yards	222	556
Rushing yards	76	197
Passing yards	146	359
Turnovers	1	0
Time of possession	27:25	32:35

Team	Category	Player	Statistics
Brown	Passing	Michael McGovern	17/29, 146 yards, INT
Brown	Rushing	Allen Smith	8 rushes, 54 yards, TD
Brown	Receiving	Livingstone Harriott	9 receptions, 117 yards
Princeton	Passing	Kevin Davidson	26/39, 304 yards, 4 TD
Princeton	Rushing	Charlie Volker	13 rushes, 102 yards, 2 TD
Princeton	Receiving	Jesper Horsted	13 receptions, 169 yards, 2 TD

=== Cornell ===
	1	2	3	4	Total
Big Red	0	14	7	13	34
Bears	0	10	0	6	16

Statistics	COR	BRWN
First downs	27	18
Total yards	498	379
Rushing yards	233	184
Passing yards	265	195
Turnovers	1	0
Time of possession	33:51	26:09

Team	Category	Player	Statistics
Cornell	Passing	Dalton Banks	19/26, 265 yards, 3 TD, INT
Cornell	Rushing	Harold Coles	21 rushes, 141 yards, TD
Cornell	Receiving	Lars Pedersen	3 receptions, 100 yards, TD
Brown	Passing	Michael McGovern	14/27, 195 yards, TD
Brown	Rushing	Livingstone Harriott	5 rushes, 73 yards, TD
Brown	Receiving	Anton Casey	4 receptions, 69 yards

=== Penn ===
	1	2	3	4	Total
Quakers	3	10	0	0	13
Bears	0	0	0	7	7

Statistics	PENN	BRWN
First downs	18	11
Total yards	370	195
Rushing yards	304	102
Passing yards	66	93
Turnovers	2	3
Time of possession	38:40	21:20

Team	Category	Player	Statistics
Penn	Passing	Nick Robinson	6/7, 46 yards, TD
Penn	Rushing	Karekin Brooks	34 rushes, 246 yards
Penn	Receiving	Steve Farrell	7 receptions, 41 yards, TD
Brown	Passing	Michael McGovern	9/19, 93 yards, TD, INT
Brown	Rushing	Scott Boylan	5 rushes, 44 yards
Brown	Receiving	Graeme Davis	4 receptions, 40 yards

=== At Yale ===
	1	2	3	4	Total
Bears	0	3	6	7	16
Bulldogs	14	6	13	13	46

Statistics	BRWN	YALE
First downs	21	34
Total yards	331	598
Rushing yards	-27	162
Passing yards	358	436
Turnovers	1	1
Time of possession	25:02	34:58

Team	Category	Player	Statistics
Brown	Passing	Michael McGovern	25/47, 358 yards, TD, INT
Brown	Rushing	Scott Boylan	8 rushes, 40 yards, TD
Brown	Receiving	Scott Boylan	9 receptions, 116 yards, TD
Yale	Passing	Griffin O'Connor	30/38, 436 yards, 4 TD
Yale	Rushing	Alan Lamar	15 rushes, 76 yards, 2 TD
Yale	Receiving	Reed Klubnik	6 receptions, 153 yards, 2 TD

=== Columbia ===
	1	2	3	4	Total
Lions	0	14	14	14	42
Bears	14	6	0	0	20

Statistics	CLMB	BRWN
First downs	24	6
Total yards	515	254
Rushing yards	190	88
Passing yards	325	166
Turnovers	0	2
Time of possession	39:22	20:38

Team	Category	Player	Statistics
Columbia	Passing	Ty Lenhart	28/42, 298 yards
Columbia	Rushing	Kyle Castner	15 rushes, 88 yards, 3 TD
Columbia	Receiving	Ronald Smith	9 receptions, 112 yards
Brown	Passing	Michael McGovern	7/18, 164 yards, 2 TD, INT
Brown	Rushing	Jakob Prall	1 rush, 90 yards, TD
Brown	Receiving	Scott Boylan	3 receptions, 88 yards, TD

=== At No. 20 Dartmouth ===
	1	2	3	4	Total
Bears	0	7	0	0	7
No. 20 Big Green	7	6	29	7	49

Statistics	BRWN	DART
First downs	16	29
Total yards	248	526
Rushing yards	-23	365
Passing yards	271	161
Turnovers	3	2
Time of possession	29:51	30:09

Team	Category	Player	Statistics
Brown	Passing	Michael McGovern	34/55, 271 yards, INT
Brown	Rushing	Scott Boylan	5 rushes, -5 yards
Brown	Receiving	Jaelon Blandburg	9 receptions, 96 yards
Dartmouth	Passing	Derek Kyler	17/27, 160 yards, TD
Dartmouth	Rushing	Rashaad Cooper	12 rushes, 98 yards, TD
Dartmouth	Receiving	Hunter Hagdorn	5 receptions, 65 yards
