= 2018 Dartmouth Big Green football team =

American college football season

2018 Dartmouth Big Green football
- Conference: Ivy League

Ranking
- STATS: No. 18
- FCS Coaches: No. 15
- Record: 9–1 (6–1 Ivy)
- Head coach: Buddy Teevens (19th season)
- Offensive coordinator: Kevin Daft (2nd season)
- Offensive scheme: Option
- Defensive coordinator: Don Dobes (9th season)
- Base defense: 4–3
- Home stadium: Memorial Field

2018 Ivy League football standings
	Conf.			Overall
Team	W		L	W		L
No. 11 Princeton $	7	–	0	10	–	0
No. 18 Dartmouth	6	–	1	9	–	1
Harvard	4	–	3	6	–	4
Yale	3	–	4	5	–	5
Penn	3	–	4	6	–	4
Columbia	3	–	4	6	–	4
Cornell	2	–	5	3	–	7
Brown	0	–	7	1	–	9
$ – Conference champion; Rankings from STATS Poll

The 2018 Dartmouth Big Green football team represented Dartmouth College in the 2018 NCAA Division I FCS football season as a member of the Ivy League. The Big Green were led by head coach Buddy Teevens in his 14th straight year and 19th overall. They played their home games at Memorial Field. They finished the season 9–1 overall and 6–1 in Ivy League play to place second. Dartmouth averaged 4,006 fans per game.

== Schedule ==
The 2018 schedule consisted of five home games and five away games. The Big Green hosted Ivy League foes Penn, Harvard, and Brown, and traveled to Yale, Princeton, Columbia, and Cornell.

Dartmouth's non-conference opponents were Georgetown and Holy Cross of the Patriot League, and Sacred Heart of the Northeast Conference. Homecoming coincided with the game against Harvard on October 27.

Date	Time	Opponent	Rank	Site	TV	Result	Attendance
September 15	1:30 p.m.	Georgetown*		Memorial Field; Hanover, NH	ESPN+	W 41–0	4,815
September 22	1:00 p.m.	at Holy Cross*		Fitton Field; Worcester, MA	PL Net	W 34–14	7,175
September 29	1:30 p.m.	Penn		Memorial Field; Hanover, NH	ESPN+	W 37–14	3,692
October 5	6:00 p.m.	at Yale		Yale Bowl; New Haven, CT	ESPNU	W 41–18	10,176
October 13	6:00 p.m.	Sacred Heart*		Memorial Field; Hanover, NH	ESPN+	W 42–0	3,138
October 20	1:30 p.m.	at Columbia		Robert K. Kraft Field at Lawrence A. Wien Stadium; New York, NY	ESPN+	W 28–12	12,506
October 27	1:30 p.m.	Harvard^{†}		Memorial Field; Hanover, NH (rivalry)	ESPN+	W 24–17	5,814
November 3	1:00 p.m.	at No. 18 Princeton	No. 24	Powers Field at Princeton Stadium; Princeton, NJ	NBCS BOS	L 9–14	8,014
November 10	1:30 p.m.	at Cornell	No. 25	Schoellkopf Field; Ithaca, NY (rivalry)	ESPN+	W 35–24	3,604
November 17	1:30 p.m.	Brown	No. 20	Memorial Field; Hanover, NH	ESPN+	W 49–7	2,575
*Non-conference game; ^{†}Homecoming; Rankings from STATS Poll released prior to the game; All times are in Eastern time

== Game summaries ==
=== Georgetown ===
	1	2	3	4	Total
Hoyas	0	0	0	0	0
Big Green	6	14	14	7	41

=== At Holy Cross ===
	1	2	3	4	Total
Big Green	3	17	7	7	34
Crusaders	0	0	0	14	14

=== Penn ===
	1	2	3	4	Total
Quakers	0	7	0	7	14
Big Green	7	6	21	3	37

=== At Yale ===
	1	2	3	4	Total
Big Green	13	14	7	7	41
Bulldogs	7	3	0	8	18

=== Sacred Heart ===
	1	2	3	4	Total
Pioneers	0	0	0	0	0
Big Green	21	14	7	0	42

=== At Columbia ===
	1	2	3	4	Total
Big Green	7	0	7	14	28
Lions	3	3	0	6	12

=== Harvard ===
	1	2	3	4	Total
Crimson	0	0	7	10	17
Big Green	14	7	0	3	24

=== At Princeton ===
	1	2	3	4	Total
No. 24 Big Green	7	2	0	0	9
No. 18 Tigers	7	0	0	7	14

=== At Cornell ===
	1	2	3	4	Total
No. 25 Big Green	21	0	14	0	35
Big Red	0	17	0	7	24

=== Brown ===
	1	2	3	4	Total
Bears	0	7	0	0	7
No. 20 Big Green	7	6	29	7	49

== Ranking movements ==
Ranking movements Legend: ██ Increase in ranking ██ Decrease in ranking — = Not ranked RV = Received votes т = Tied with team above or below
	Week													
Poll	Pre	1	2	3	4	5	6	7	8	9	10	11	12	Final
STATS FCS	RV	—	—	RV	RV	RV	RV	RV	RV	24	25	20	18	18
Coaches	—	—	—	—	—	RV	—	24	20	20–T	23	20	15	15
