= 2018 Columbia Lions football team =

American college football season

2018 Columbia Lions football

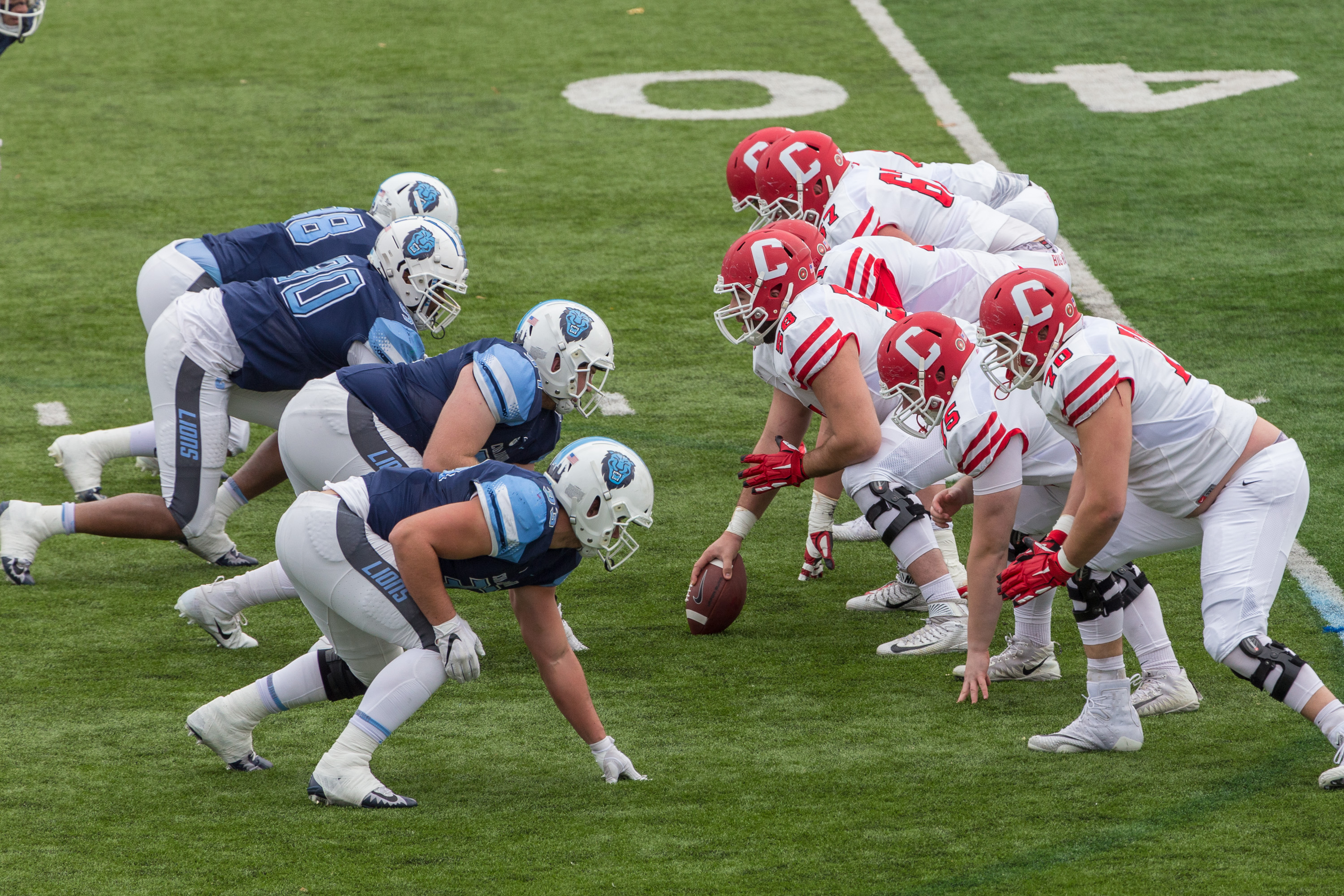
- Columbia vs Cornell Big Red at Wien Stadium, November 17
- Conference: Ivy League
- Record: 6–4 (3–4 Ivy)
- Head coach: Al Bagnoli (4th season)
- Offensive coordinator: Mark Fabish (3rd season)
- Defensive coordinator: Paul Ferraro (4th season)
- Home stadium: Robert K. Kraft Field at Lawrence A. Wien Stadium

2018 Ivy League football standings
	Conf.			Overall
Team	W		L	W		L
No. 11 Princeton $	7	–	0	10	–	0
No. 18 Dartmouth	6	–	1	9	–	1
Harvard	4	–	3	6	–	4
Yale	3	–	4	5	–	5
Penn	3	–	4	6	–	4
Columbia	3	–	4	6	–	4
Cornell	2	–	5	3	–	7
Brown	0	–	7	1	–	9
$ – Conference champion; Rankings from STATS Poll

The 2018 Columbia Lions football team represented Columbia University in the 2018 NCAA Division I FCS football season as a member of the Ivy League. They were led by fourth-year head coach Al Bagnoli and played their home games at Robert K. Kraft Field at Lawrence A. Wien Stadium. They finished the season 6–4, 3–4 in Ivy League play to finish in a three-way tie for fourth place. Columbia averaged 5,667 fans per game.

== Schedule ==
The 2018 schedule consisted of five home and five away games. The Lions hosted Ivy League foes Princeton, Dartmouth, Yale, and Cornell, and traveled to Penn, Harvard, and Brown. Homecoming coincided with the game against Dartmouth on October 20.

In 2018, Columbia's non-conference opponents were Central Connecticut of the Northeast Conference, Georgetown of the Patriot League, and Marist of the Pioneer Football League.

Date	Time	Opponent	Site	TV	Result	Attendance
September 15	5:00 p.m.	at Central Connecticut*	Arute Field; New Britain, CT	NECFR	W 41–24	3,789
September 22	2:00 p.m.	at Georgetown*	Cooper Field; Washington, DC	PL Net	W 23–15	1,865
September 28	6:00 p.m.	Princeton	Robert K. Kraft Field at Lawrence A. Wien Stadium; New York, NY	ESPNU	L 10–45	5,327
October 6	1:00 p.m.	Marist*	Robert K. Kraft Field at Lawrence A. Wien Stadium; New York, NY	ESPN+	W 34–24	3,296
October 13	1:00 p.m.	at Penn	Franklin Field; Philadelphia, PA	ESPN+	L 10–13	6,011
October 20	1:30 p.m.	Dartmouth^{†}	Robert K. Kraft Field at Lawrence A. Wien Stadium; New York, NY	ESPN+	L 12–28	12,506
October 27	1:00 p.m.	Yale	Robert K. Kraft Field at Lawrence A. Wien Stadium; New York, NY	ESPN+	W 17–10	2,555
November 3	12:00 p.m.	at Harvard	Harvard Stadium; Boston, MA	ESPN+/NESN	L 18–52	10,447
November 10	12:00 p.m.	at Brown	Brown Stadium; Providence, RI	ESPN+	W 42–20	2,118
November 17	1:00 p.m.	Cornell	Robert K. Kraft Field at Lawrence A. Wien Stadium; New York, NY (rivalry)	ESPN+	W 24–21	4,651
*Non-conference game; ^{†}Homecoming; All times are in Eastern time

== Game summaries ==
=== At Central Connecticut ===
	1	2	3	4	Total
Lions	14	3	10	14	41
Blue Devils	7	7	0	10	24

=== At Georgetown ===
	1	2	3	4	Total
Lions	10	0	6	7	23
Hoyas	0	0	0	15	15

=== Princeton ===
	1	2	3	4	Total
Tigers	13	17	15	0	45
Lions	3	7	0	0	10

=== Marist ===
	1	2	3	4	Total
Red Foxes	0	14	7	3	24
Lions	0	17	14	3	34

=== At Penn ===
	1	2	3	4	Total
Lions	0	0	10	0	10
Quakers	3	3	0	7	13

=== Dartmouth ===
	1	2	3	4	Total
Big Green	7	0	7	14	28
Lions	3	3	0	6	12

=== Yale ===
	1	2	3	4	Total
Bulldogs	0	10	0	0	10
Lions	3	0	7	7	17

=== At Harvard ===
	1	2	3	4	Total
Lions	6	6	0	6	18
Crimson	21	7	7	17	52

=== At Brown ===
	1	2	3	4	Total
Lions	0	14	14	14	42
Bears	14	6	0	0	20

=== Cornell ===
	1	2	3	4	Total
Big Red	0	7	0	14	21
Lions	10	0	0	14	24
