= Dathan Hickey =

American gridiron football player (born 2000)

- Hickey with the Toronto Argonauts in 2026

No. 37 – Toronto Argonauts
- Position: Defensive back
- Roster status: Practice roster
- CFL status: American

Personal information
- Born: March 27, 2000 (age 26)
- Listed height: 6 ft 1 in (1.85 m)
- Listed weight: 200 lb (91 kg)

Career information
- High school: Bristol Central (Bristol, Connecticut)
- College: Yale (2018–2023); Youngstown State (2024–2025)
- NFL draft: 2026: undrafted

Career history
- Toronto Argonauts (2026–present)
- Stats at CFL.ca

Dathan Hickey (born March 27, 2000) is an American professional football defensive back for the Toronto Argonauts of the Canadian Football League (CFL). He played college football for the Yale Bulldogs and Youngstown State Penguins.

== Early life ==
Hickey was born on March 27, 2000. He attended Bristol Central High School in Bristol, Connecticut, where he had 1,402 rushing yards, 30 touchdowns, 48 tackles and two interceptions in his senior season. Hickey also played basketball, baseball and track, helping set a school record in the 4×100 relay.

== College career ==
Hickey played college football for the Yale Bulldogs from 2018 to 2023 and Youngstown State Penguins from 2024 to 2025. As a true freshman, he had 28 tackles, 0.5 sack, four pass break ups and one forced fumble. The following year, Hickey made 25 tackles, three interceptions, six pass defenses and a one fumble recovery. After the 2020 season was cancelled, he played in eight games in 2021, where he made 31 tackles, four forced fumbles and one interception. The next two seasons, Hickey suffered season ending injures, granting him extra years of eligibility.

In 2024, Hickey transferred to Youngstown State University and sat out he season recovering from a meniscus injury. In 2025, he had 67 tackles, four pass break ups, two interceptions, two forced fumbles and one fumble recovery.

== Professional career ==
Pre-draft measurables
Height	Weight	Arm length	Hand span	Wingspan	40-yard dash	10-yard split	20-yard split	20-yard shuttle	Three-cone drill	Vertical jump	Broad jump	Bench press
6 ft 1 in (1.85 m)	199 lb (90 kg)	31 3/8 in (0.80 m)	10 in (0.25 m)	6 ft 5 3/4 in (1.97 m)	4.59 s	1.56 s	2.62 s	4.18 s	6.95 s	33.5 in (0.85 m)	10 ft 8 in (3.25 m)	16 reps
All values from Pro day

=== Toronto Argonauts ===
After not being selected in the 2026 NFL draft, Hickey signed with the Toronto Argonauts of the Canadian Football League (CFL) as an undrafted free agent. On August 14, he was elevated to the active roster and made his CFL debut against the Edmonton Elks, recording one special teams tackle. On August 20, Hickey reverted to the practice roster. On September 21, he was re-signed to the active roster.
