= Buddy Teevens =

American football player and coach (1956–2023)

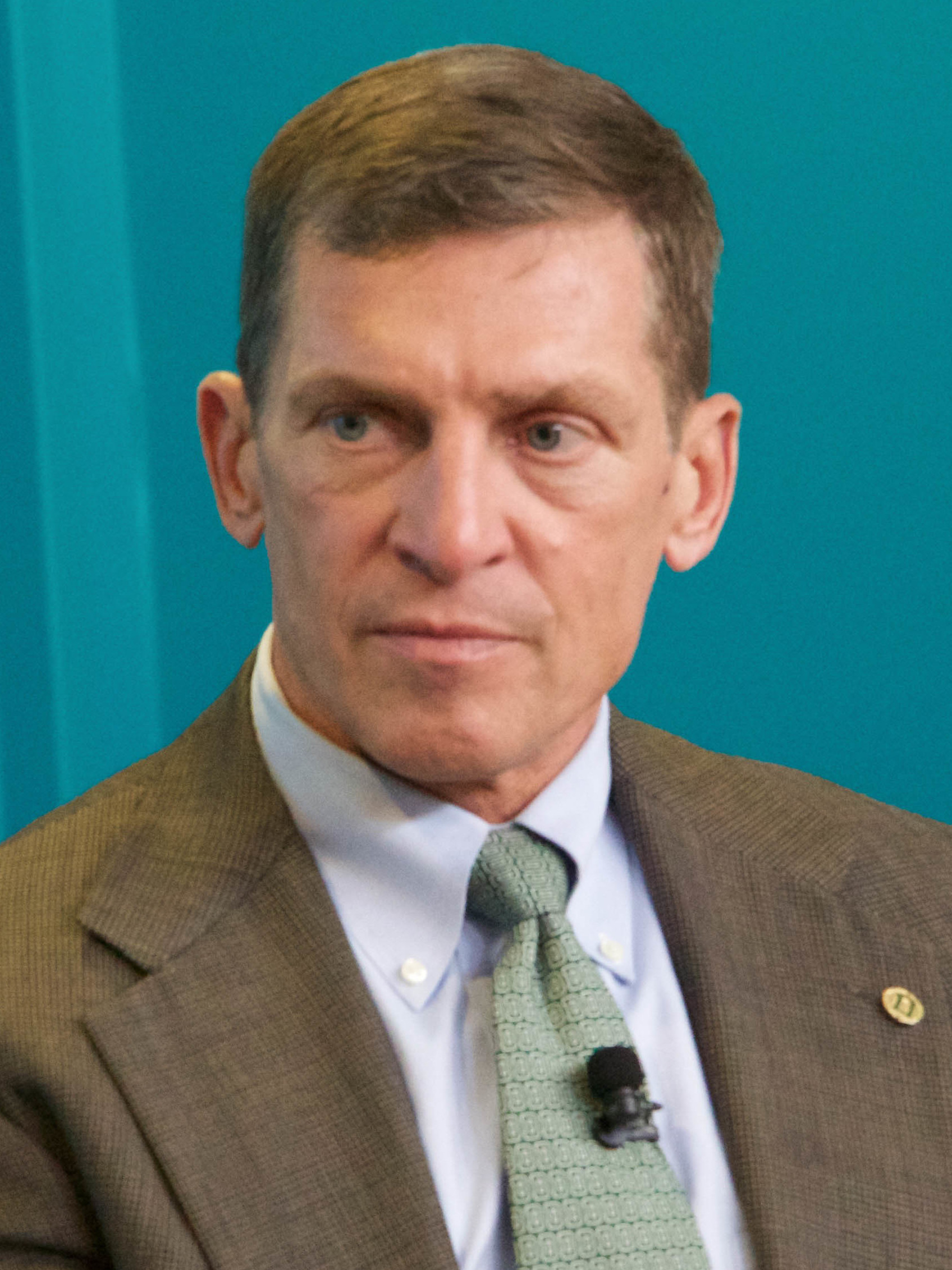
- Teevens in 2017

Biographical details
- Born: October 1, 1956; Pembroke, Massachusetts, U.S.
- Died: September 19, 2023 (aged 66); Boston, Massachusetts, U.S.

Playing career
- 1975–1978: Dartmouth
- Position: Quarterback

Coaching career (HC unless noted)
- 1979–1980: DePauw (RB)
- 1981–1984: Boston University (OC)
- 1985–1986: Maine
- 1987–1991: Dartmouth
- 1992–1996: Tulane
- 1997–1998: Illinois (OC/WR)
- 1999: Florida (RB)
- 2000: Florida (QB/WR/TE/ST)
- 2001: Florida (asst. OC/TE)
- 2002–2004: Stanford
- 2005–2022: Dartmouth

Head coaching record
- Overall: 151–178–2

Accomplishments and honors

Championships
- 5 Ivy League (1990, 1991, 2015, 2019, 2021)

Eugene Francis "Buddy" Teevens III (October 1, 1956 – September 19, 2023) was an American college football player and coach. He played as a quarterback at Dartmouth College, where he was later the head coach from 1987 to 1991 and from 2005 until his death. He also served as the head football coach at the University of Maine (1985–1986), Tulane University (1992–1996), and Stanford University (2002–2004). During his coaching career, Teevens was known for his support and efforts towards making the sport safer.

== Early life ==
Born in Pembroke, Massachusetts, Teevens attended Silver Lake Regional High School in Kingston, Massachusetts and Deerfield Academy. He attended college at Dartmouth where he was a member of Beta Theta Pi and played quarterback there from 1975 to 1978. He was a backup for then quarterback Kevin Case, who won the Dartmouth MVP in 1976. He was the quarterback of the Big Green team that won the Ivy League football title in 1978. He was an honorable mention All-America that same year.

Teevens also played hockey while at Dartmouth; in Teevens' senior year, the hockey team finished third in the NCAA Men's Ice Hockey Championship. He graduated from Dartmouth in 1979 with an A.B. in history. Teevens was also a member of the Sphinx Senior Society while at Dartmouth.

== Coaching career ==
=== Early positions ===
Teevens' first coaching job was as running backs coach at DePauw University from 1979 to 1980. He was then offensive coordinator at Boston University from 1981 to 1984.

From 1985 to 1986, he was the head coach at the University of Maine. He had an overall record of 13–9 there.

=== Dartmouth ===
Teevens' first stint with the Big Green, from 1987 to 1991, showed an upward trend. Beginning with a 2–8 record, Dartmouth then had successive years of 5–5 and 7–2–1. In 1990 and 1991, Dartmouth won the Ivy League championship.

=== Tulane ===
After his first head coaching job at Dartmouth, Teevens was the coach at Tulane University from 1992 to 1996. While he had an overall record of 11–45 in five years at Tulane, he recruited many of the players on the 1998 team that went 12–0.

=== Return to assistant coaching ===
Between 1997 and 1998, Teevens was the offensive coordinator and wide receiver coach at the University of Illinois at Urbana-Champaign for head coach Ron Turner.

In 1999, Teevens was the running backs coach at the University of Florida. The next year, he coached the passing game, wide receivers, tight ends, placekickers, long snappers, and holders. He coached tight ends in 2001 along with being the assistant offensive coordinator. In his three years at Florida, he coached under Steve Spurrier.

=== Stanford ===
Teevens coached at Stanford University from 2002 to 2004. In his three years with the Cardinal, his teams posted a 10–23 record, beat BYU twice and San Jose State three times. However, Stanford failed to improve much during his tenure. Teevens went winless against rivals USC, Cal, and Notre Dame, and never posted a win against a team that finished the season with a winning record. Teevens was fired on November 29, 2004. The Associated Press wrote that Teevens was "respected for his class and loyalty" and that he even appeared at the official announcement of his firing.

=== Return to Dartmouth ===
Teevens was re-hired as Dartmouth's head coach on January 5, 2005, and in the 2005 season, the Big Green posted a 2–8 record. The 2008 team went 0–10, the first winless season in Dartmouth history. As of the end of 2009, Teevens had an overall record of 35–63–2 as the head coach at Dartmouth. However, in the 2010 season, Dartmouth seemed to turn the corner under Teevens, posting a 6–4 record, its best record in 13 years. In the 2014 season, the team was 6–1 in the Ivy League, losing only to Harvard, behind whom it finished in second place. In 2019, he became the winningest coach in Dartmouth football history.

Teevens won five Ivy League titles with Dartmouth, second most in team history next to Bob Blackman, who won seven with Dartmouth.

=== Safety in football training ===
Teevens was known nationally for his support and efforts towards making the sport safer, having worked to reduce full-contact practices by emphasizing technique, eventually leading to Dartmouth's engineering school developing the "Mobile Virtual Player" (MVP), a robotic tackling dummy eventually becoming used by other colleges and NFL teams. In 2016, Teevens testified before the U.S. House Subcommittee on Oversight and Investigations during a hearing on concussions in youth sports.

== Personal life ==
Teevens and his wife, Kirsten, had two children together: Lindsay, who graduated from the University of Florida in 2008, and Eugene IV, who attended Coastal Carolina University. He had four grandchildren.

=== Death and legacy ===
On March 16, 2023, at approximately 8:40 p.m. Teevens was hit by a Ford F-150 truck in St. Augustine, Florida, while riding his bicycle. Reports stated that he failed to yield the right of way while attempting to cross the highway. It was also noted that his bike did not have any lights nor was he wearing a helmet. As a result of the crash, Teevens' spinal cord was injured and he later had his right leg amputated. Teevens died on September 19, 2023, from the injuries he sustained in the accident. He was 66.

On October 4, 2024, Dartmouth's stadium was renamed in Teevens' honor.

== Head coaching record ==
Year	Team	Overall	Conference	Standing	Bowl/playoffs
Maine Black Bears (Yankee Conference) (1985–1986)
1985	Maine	6–5	2–3	T–3rd	
1986	Maine	7–4	3–4	T–5th	
Maine:		13–9			
Dartmouth Big Green (Ivy League) (1987–1991)
1987	Dartmouth	2–8	1–6	7th	
1988	Dartmouth	5–5	4–3	T–3rd	
1989	Dartmouth	5–5	4–3	4th	
1990	Dartmouth	7–2–1	6–1	1st	
1991	Dartmouth	7–2–1	6–0–1	1st	
Tulane Green Wave (NCAA Division I-A independent) (1992–1995)
1992	Tulane	2–9			
1993	Tulane	4–8			
1994	Tulane	1–10			
1995	Tulane	2–9			
Tulane Green Wave (Conference USA) (1996)
1996	Tulane	2–9	1–4	6th	
Tulane:		11–45	1–4		
Stanford Cardinal (Pacific-10 Conference) (2002–2004)
2002	Stanford	2–9	1–7	T–9th	
2003	Stanford	4–7	2–6	T–8th	
2004	Stanford	4–7	2–6	T–8th	
Stanford:		10–23	5–19		
Dartmouth Big Green (Ivy League) (2005–2022)
2005	Dartmouth	2–8	1–6	7th	
2006	Dartmouth	2–8	2–5	T–6th	
2007	Dartmouth	3–7	3–4	T–4th	
2008	Dartmouth	0–10	0–7	8th	
2009	Dartmouth	2–8	2–5	T–6th	
2010	Dartmouth	6–4	3–4	5th	
2011	Dartmouth	5–5	4–3	T–2nd	
2012	Dartmouth	6–4	4–3	T–3rd	
2013	Dartmouth	6–4	5–2	3rd	
2014	Dartmouth	8–2	6–1	2nd	
2015	Dartmouth	9–1	6–1	T–1st	
2016	Dartmouth	4–6	1–6	8th	
2017	Dartmouth	8–2	5–2	T–2nd	
2018	Dartmouth	9–1	6–1	2nd	
2019	Dartmouth	9–1	6–1	T–1st	
2020–21	No team—COVID-19				
2021	Dartmouth	9–1	6–1	T–1st	
2022	Dartmouth	3–7	2–5	T–6th	
Dartmouth:		117–101–2	83–70–1		
Total:		151–178–2			
National championship Conference title Conference division title or championship game berth
