= Bob Surace =

American football player and coach (born 1968)

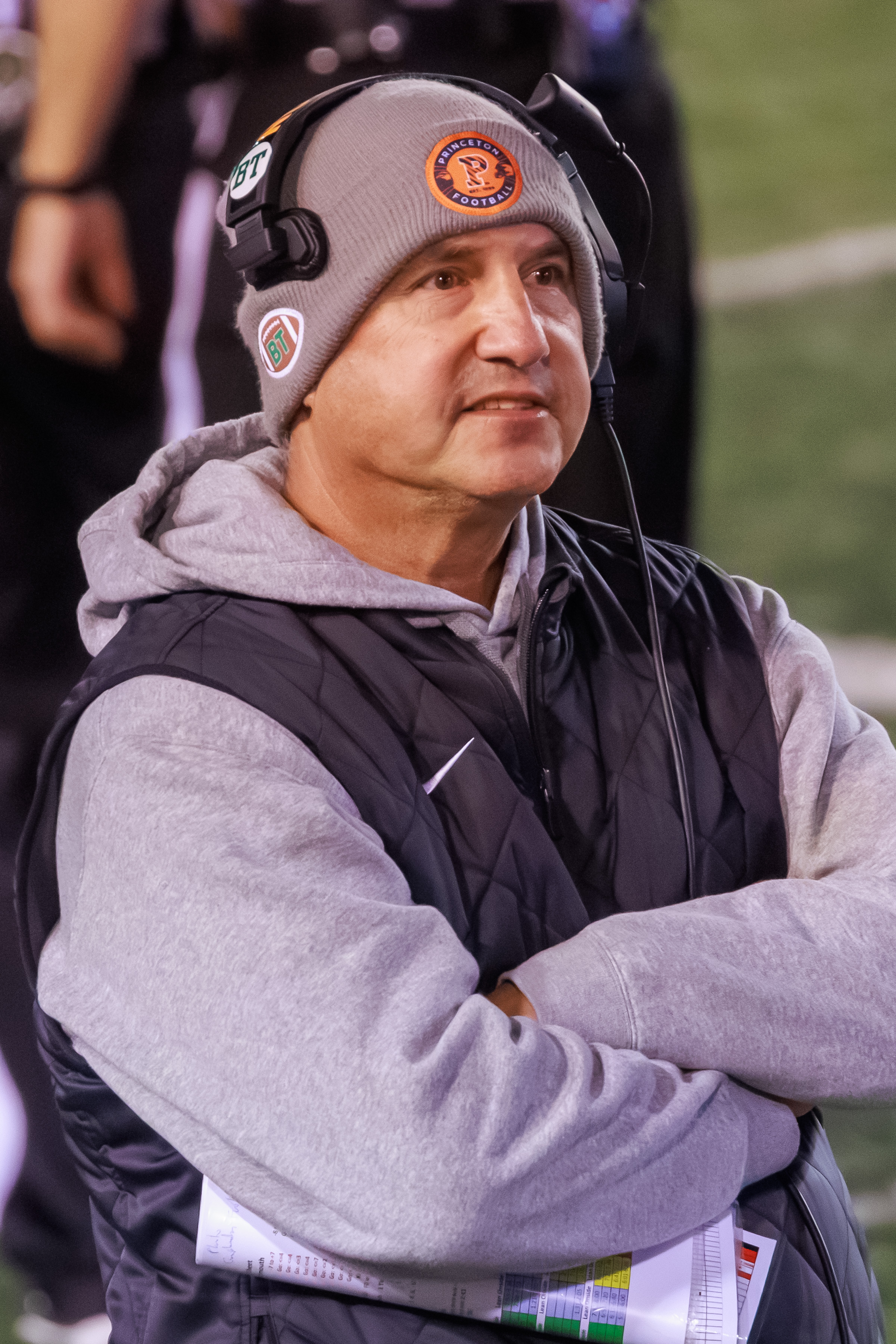

Current position
- Title: Head coach
- Team: Princeton
- Conference: Ivy League
- Record: 90–70

Biographical details
- Born: April 25, 1968 (age 58); Harrisburg, Pennsylvania, U.S.

Playing career
- 1987–1989: Princeton
- Position: Center

Coaching career (HC unless noted)
- 1990–1992: Springfield (RB)
- 1993: Maine Maritime Academy (OL)
- 1994–1995: Shreveport Pirates (assistant)
- 1995–1996: RPI (OL)
- 1996–1999: Western Connecticut (OC)
- 2000–2001: Western Connecticut
- 2002–2003: Cincinnati Bengals (off. asst.)
- 2004–2009: Cincinnati Bengals (asst. OL)
- 2010–present: Princeton

Head coaching record
- Overall: 108–73
- Bowls: 1–0
- Tournaments: 1–1 (NCAA D-III playoffs)

Accomplishments and honors

Championships
- 1 FFC (2001); 4 Ivy (2013, 2016, 2018, 2021)

Robert J. Surace (pronounced /səˈreɪs/; born April 25, 1968) is an American college football coach. He is currently the head coach at Princeton University, a position he has held since the 2010 season. Surace was the head football coach at Western Connecticut State University from 2000 to 2001. He had worked as an assistant coach in the Canadian Football League (CFL) and the National Football League (NFL).

== Early life ==
Surace was born on April 25, 1968, in Harrisburg, Pennsylvania, grew up in Millville, New Jersey and attended Millville Senior High School, where his father, Tony Surace, was a longtime football and baseball coach. He attended Princeton University, where he played on the football team from 1987 to 1989 as a center. In 1989, the Ivy League named Surace to the All-Ivy team. He graduated in 1990. Surace's wife Lisa was a former soccer player at Princeton, and practiced psychology in Cincinnati. The couple have a son, A.J., who is a Quarterback at Rutgers and a daughter, Allison. His brother Brian was the offensive coordinator at Rensselaer Polytechnic Institute.

== Coaching career ==
Surace began coaching in 1990 as the running backs coach at Springfield College. While there, he earned a Master of Arts degree in sports management. In 1993, he was the offensive line coach at the Maine Maritime Academy. In 1994, he was an assistant coach under Forrest Gregg for the Shreveport Pirates of the Canadian Football League. In 1995, he was the offensive line coach at Rensselaer Polytechnic Institute. In 1999, he became the offensive coordinator at Western Connecticut State University. In 2000, Surace was promoted to head coach. In his second season, he led the Colonials to the Freedom Football Conference championship and the second round of the NCAA Division III Championship playoffs. His record at Western Connecticut State was 18–3. Surace then joined the staff of the Cincinnati Bengals in the National Football League. From 2002 to 2003, he was an offensive staff assistant, and from 2004 to 2009, an assistant offensive line coach.

Princeton hired Surace in December 2009, which made him the first alumnus as coach since Bob Casciola in 1977. In his first season, Princeton finished with a 1–9 record.

== Head coaching record ==
Year	Team	Overall	Conference	Standing	Bowl/playoffs	STATS^{#}	Coaches^{°}
Western Connecticut Colonials (Freedom Football Conference) (2000–2001)
2000	Western Connecticut	10–1	5–1	2nd	W Northeast		
2001	Western Connecticut	8–2	5–1	T–1st	L NCAA Division III Second Round		
Western Connecticut:		18–3	10–2				
Princeton Tigers (Ivy League) (2010–present)
2010	Princeton	1–9	0–7	8th			
2011	Princeton	1–9	1–6	T–7th			
2012	Princeton	5–5	4–3	T–3rd			
2013	Princeton	8–2	6–1	T–1st			
2014	Princeton	5–5	4–3	4th			
2015	Princeton	5–5	2–5	6th			
2016	Princeton	8–2	6–1	T–1st			
2017	Princeton	5–5	2–5	7th			
2018	Princeton	10–0	7–0	1st		11	9
2019	Princeton	8–2	5–2	3rd			
2020–21	No team—COVID-19						
2021	Princeton	9–1	6–1	T–1st		24	21
2022	Princeton	8–2	5–2	T–2nd			
2023	Princeton	5–5	4–3	4th			
2024	Princeton	3–7	2–5	T–6th			
2025	Princeton	3–7	2–5	T–6th			
2026	Princeton	6–4	4–3	T–2nd			
Princeton:		90–70	60–52				
Total:		108–73					
National championship Conference title Conference division title or championship game berth

== Coaching tree ==
Several of Bob Surace's former assistant coaches have gone on to become head coaches themselves. The list is as follows:

- James Perry - Bryant (2017–2018), Brown (2019–present)
- Andrew Aurich - Harvard (2024–present)
- Mike Willis - Marist (2024–present)
