= Ray Priore =

American football coach (born 1963)

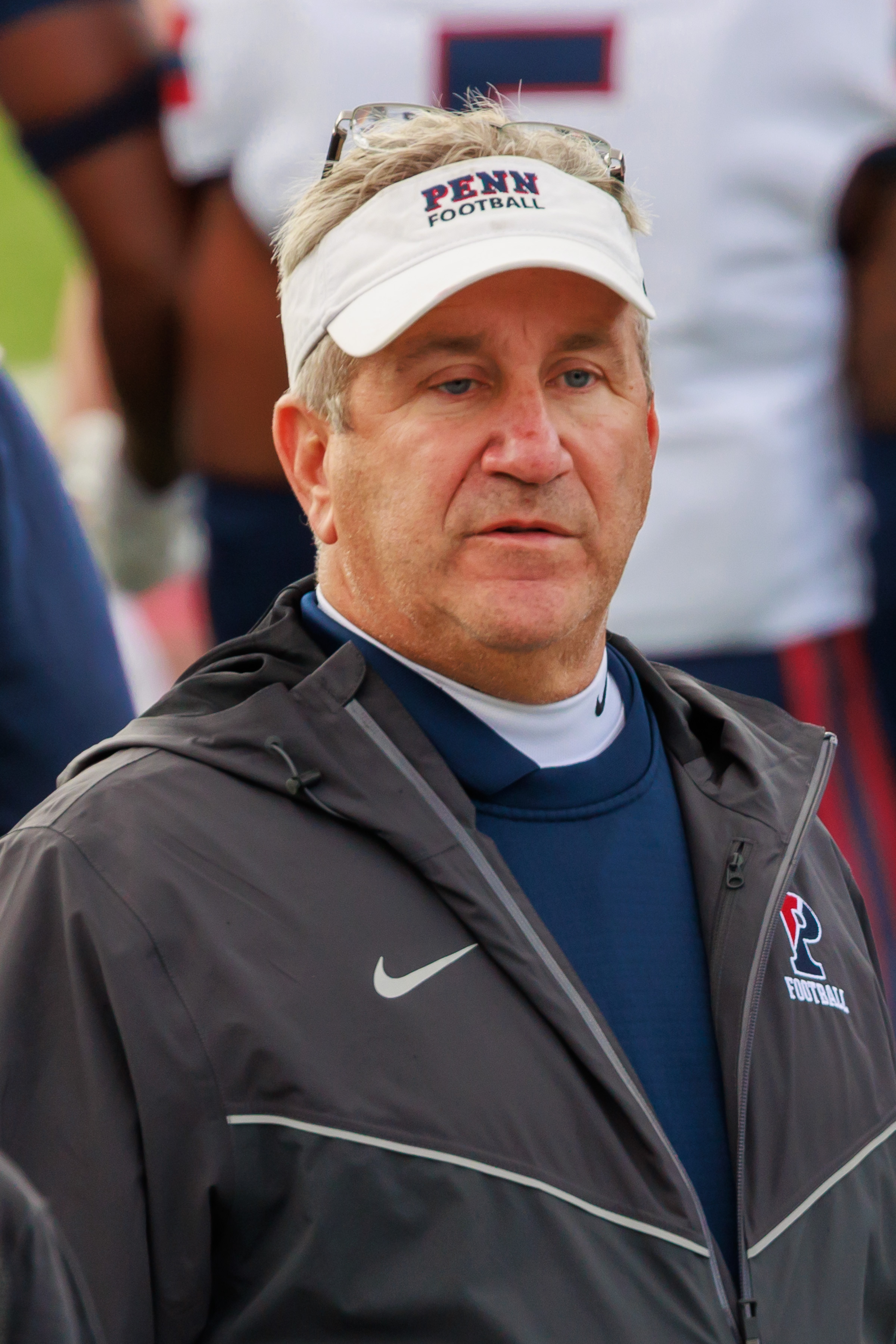
- Priore in 2024

Biographical details
- Born: 1963 (age 62–63); Long Beach, New York, U.S.
- Education: SUNY Albany

Coaching career (HC unless noted)
- 1985–1986: Albany (DB)
- 1987–1989: Penn (LB)
- 1991–1994: Penn (DE)
- 1995–1997: Penn (DE/ST)
- 1998–2005: Penn (DC)
- 2006–2014: Penn (AHC/DC)
- 2015–2025: Penn

Administrative career (AD unless noted)
- 1992–2005: Penn (RC)

Head coaching record
- Overall: 58–42

Accomplishments and honors

Championships
- 2 Ivy League (2015, 2016)

Awards
- Ivy League Coach of the Year (2015)

Raymond P. Priore (born 1963) is an American college football coach. He was the head football coach at the University of Pennsylvania from 2015 to 2025. Previously, he was a long-time assistant for Penn spanning 28 years across four decades.

== Coaching career ==
=== Early years ===
Priore received his master's degree from Albany University in 1986 and began his tenure at Penn as an assistant linebackers coach the following year. Priore coached a variety of positions before becoming the defensive coordinator in 1998. After 20 years in the program, he became an assistant head coach in 2006.

As the defensive coordinator, Priore led the Quakers to several historic defensive accomplishments. For three consecutive seasons, Penn boasted best rushing and scoring defensive in the Ivy League (2008–2010). Additionally, the program finished in the top five for overall defense (FCS) in 2002, 2008, 2009 and 2010. Between 2005 and 2015, 35 members of Priore's secondaries were named 1st team All-Ivy including NFL draftees Jake Lewko and Brandon Copeland.

In 2014, longtime head coach Al Bagnoli resigned following a 2–8 campaign and the university subsequently named Priore as the 22nd head coach of Penn football. Bagnoli is recognized as the all-time winningest coach in Penn football history.

In his 28 seasons as an assistant, Priore helped the Quakers to ten Ivy League championships.

=== Head coaching ===
==== 2015 ====
On December 1, 2014, Priore became head coach of Penn after 28 seasons as an assistant in the program. Prior to the announcement, Priore had spent 16 years as defensive coordinator for the Quakers.

The Quakers were predicted to finish sixth in their conference. However, in his first year at the helm, coach Priore led his team to a 7-3 overall record and their first Ivy League championship since 2012. His inaugural season was highlighted by wins over #5 Villanova and #12 Harvard.

On November 24, 2025, Priore announced that he would step down from his position, after serving 11 years as head coach and 39 years with the program.

== Personal life ==
Priore's older brother, Chuck Priore, was the head football coach at Trinity College from 2000 to 2005 and Stony Brook University from 2006 to 2023.

== Head coaching record ==
Year	Team	Overall	Conference	Standing	Bowl/playoffs
Penn Quakers (Ivy League) (2015–2025)
2015	Penn	7–3	6–1	T–1st	
2016	Penn	7–3	6–1	T–1st	
2017	Penn	6–4	4–3	4th	
2018	Penn	6–4	3–4	T–4th	
2019	Penn	5–5	3–4	T–4th	
2020–21	No team—COVID-19				
2021	Penn	3–7	1–6	T–6th	
2022	Penn	8–2	5–2	T-2nd	
2023	Penn	6–4	3–4	T–5th	
2024	Penn	4–6	2–5	T–6th	
2025	Penn	6–4	4–3	T–3rd	
Penn:		58–42	33–30		
Total:		58–42			
National championship Conference title Conference division title or championship game berth
