= Harvard–Princeton football rivalry =

American college football rivalry

- Harvard Crimson Princeton Tigers
- First meeting: April 28, 1877; Harvard, 1–0
- Latest meeting: October 24, 2026; Harvard, 35–7
- Next meeting: September 11, 2027

Statistics
- Total meetings: 118
- All-time series: Princeton leads 60–51–7
- Largest victory: Harvard, 49–7 (2014)
- Longest win streak: Harvard, 9 (1996–2004)
- Current win streak: Harvard, 3 (2024–present)

Locations of Harvard and Princeton

The Harvard–Princeton football rivalry is an American college football rivalry between the Harvard Crimson football team of Harvard University and the Princeton Tigers football team of Princeton University. Princeton leads the series 60–51–7.

== Significance ==
The football rivalry is constituent to the Big Three academic, athletic and social rivalry among alumni and students associated with Harvard, Yale and Princeton universities.

Agreements among the athletics departments in 1906, 1916, the "Three Presidents Agreement" on eligibility, and a revision of that Agreement in 1923 have been considered precursors to the Ivy Group Agreement creating the Ivy League, each agreement addressing amateurism and college football.

Twenty eight different teams, 17 representing Harvard and 11 representing Princeton, have shared or won outright the Ivy League football title.

Bad blood has flowed between the two football programs. Princeton, for example, turned down Harvard's offer of a Thanksgiving Day contest in 1892, with Harvard refusing to play Princeton that season.

The 1920s was a nadir for athletic relations between the institutions.

Harvard and Princeton ceased the football series for nearly a decade, 1926 – 1934, in part because of an over the top Harvard Lampoon spoof issue of The Harvard Crimson distributed during the 1926 contest that announced the death of Princeton's head coach, Bill Roper, a man who had a history of serious illness. Roper, who coached Princeton's Team of Destiny, is a member of the College Football Hall of Fame. William J. Bingham, a Harvard alumnus and athletics administrator, decided Harvard football could not guarantee to play any football program save Yale. That Harvard wanted to play a national schedule was the declared reason for the change.

== Notable games ==
=== 1926 ===
Princeton shut out Harvard, 12–0, then shunned Harvard for eight football seasons; then Princeton shut out Harvard, 19–0, in 1934. Thereafter, save the World War II years, the two programs have met annually.

=== 1950 ===
The 1950 Princeton Tigers football team, coached by former Princeton player Charley Caldwell, claimed a national title. The undefeated, untied team embarrassed Harvard, 63–26, at Palmer Stadium en route to a HYP and other championships.

=== 1951 ===
The 1951 Princeton football team crushed the Crimson, 54–13 in Boston.

=== 1967 ===
Ellis Moore ran for five touchdowns versus Harvard. Moore's effort is the 20th-century Princeton record for rushing touchdowns in a game. Princeton won, 45–6. Moore rushed for three touchdowns versus Harvard two seasons later.

=== 2012 ===
Quinn Epperly tossed, with 0:13 remaining in the game, a 36-yard touchdown to Roman Wilson to take the lead and win eventually, 39–34, at Princeton Stadium. Harvard led, 34–10, early in the fourth quarter. Wilson caught five passes.

=== 2016 ===
"Princeton certainly didn't deserve to lose the game," Harvard's Tim Murphy said, a sentiment shared at least by Princeton partisans, after Harvard's 23 – 20 win at Princeton University Stadium. Joe Viviano, Harvard quarterback, scored from the one on second down after Princeton settled for a field goal in overtime. Harvard's Luke Hutton defended successfully a pass play at the one yard line during Princeton's overtime possession.

Princeton shares League title with Penn after Yale defeats Harvard later in the season, denying Harvard a fourth-straight outright or shared League title.

== Game results ==
Harvard victories	Princeton victories	Tie games

No.	Date	Location	Winner	Score
1	April 28, 1877	Boston, MA	Harvard	1–0
2	November 3, 1877	St. George's CC	Princeton	1–0
3	November 16, 1878	Boston, MA	Princeton	1–0
4	November 15, 1879	St. George's CC	Princeton	1–0
5	November 13, 1880	Princeton, NJ	Princeton	1–0
6	November 19, 1881	Princeton, NJ	Tie	0–0
7	November 18, 1882	Cambridge, MA	Harvard	1–0
8	November 17, 1883	Princeton, NJ	Princeton	26–7
9	November 19, 1884	Cambridge, MA	Princeton	36–6
10	November 13, 1886	Princeton, NJ	Princeton	12–0
11	November 12, 1887	Cambridge, MA	Harvard	12–0
12	November 17, 1888	Princeton, NJ	Princeton	18–6
13	November 16, 1889	Cambridge, MA	Princeton	41–15
14	November 2, 1895	Princeton, NJ	Princeton	12–4
15	November 7, 1896	Boston, MA	Princeton	12–0
16	November 4, 1911	Princeton, NJ	Princeton	8–6
17	November 2, 1912	Boston, MA	Harvard	16–6
18	November 8, 1913	Princeton, NJ	Harvard	3–0
19	November 7, 1914	Boston, MA	Harvard	20–0
20	November 6, 1915	Princeton, NJ	Harvard	10–6
21	November 11, 1916	Boston, MA	Harvard	3–0
22	November 8, 1919	Princeton, NJ	Tie	10–10
23	November 6, 1920	Boston, MA	Tie	14–14
24	November 5, 1921	Princeton, NJ	Princeton	10–3
25	November 11, 1922	Boston, MA	Princeton	10–3
26	November 10, 1923	Princeton, NJ	Harvard	5–0
27	November 8, 1924	Boston, MA	Princeton	34–0
28	November 7, 1925	Princeton, NJ	Princeton	36–0
29	November 6, 1926	Boston, MA	Princeton	12–0
30	November 3, 1934	Boston, MA	Princeton	19–0
31	November 9, 1935	Princeton, NJ	Princeton	35–0
32	October 31, 1936	Boston, MA	Tie	14–14
33	October 30, 1937	Princeton, NJ	Harvard	34–6
34	October 29, 1938	Boston, MA	Harvard	26–7
35	November 4, 1939	Princeton, NJ	Princeton	9–6
36	November 2, 1940	Boston, MA	Tie	0–0
37	November 1, 1941	Princeton, NJ	Harvard	6–4
38	October 31, 1942	Boston, MA	Harvard	19–14
39	October 12, 1946	Princeton, NJ	Harvard	13–12
40	November 8, 1947	Boston, MA	Princeton	33–7
41	November 6, 1948	Princeton, NJ	Princeton	47–7
42	November 5, 1949	Boston, MA	Princeton	33–13
43	November 11, 1950	Princeton, NJ	Princeton	63–26
44	November 10, 1951	Boston, MA	Princeton	54–13
45	November 8, 1952	Princeton, NJ	Princeton	41–21
46	November 7, 1953	Boston, MA	Princeton	6–0
47	November 6, 1954	Princeton, NJ	Harvard	14–9
48	November 5, 1955	Boston, MA	Harvard	7–6
49	November 10, 1956	Princeton, NJ	Princeton	35–20
50	November 9, 1957	Boston, MA	Princeton	28–20
51	November 8, 1958	Princeton, NJ	Princeton	16–14
52	November 7, 1959	Boston, MA	Harvard	14–0
53	November 5, 1960	Princeton, NJ	Princeton	14–12
54	November 11, 1961	Boston, MA	Harvard	9–7
55	November 10, 1962	Princeton, NJ	Harvard	20–0
56	November 9, 1963	Boston, MA	Harvard	21–7
57	November 7, 1964	Princeton, NJ	Princeton	16–0
58	November 6, 1965	Boston, MA	Princeton	14–6
59	November 5, 1966	Princeton, NJ	Princeton	18–14
60	November 11, 1967	Boston, MA	Princeton	45–6

No.	Date	Location	Winner	Score
61	November 9, 1968	Princeton, NJ	Harvard	9–7
62	November 8, 1969	Boston, MA	Princeton	51–20
63	November 7, 1970	Princeton, NJ	Harvard	29–7
64	November 6, 1971	Boston, MA	Princeton	21–10
65	November 11, 1972	Princeton, NJ	Princeton	10–7
66	November 10, 1973	Boston, MA	Harvard	19–14
67	November 9, 1974	Princeton, NJ	Harvard	34–17
68	November 8, 1975	Boston, MA	Princeton	24–20
69	October 23, 1976	Princeton, NJ	Harvard	20–14
70	October 22, 1977	Boston, MA	Princeton	20–7
71	October 28, 1978	Princeton, NJ	Tie	24–24
72	October 27, 1979	Boston, MA	Princeton	9–7
73	October 25, 1980	Princeton, NJ	Princeton	7–3
74	October 24, 1981	Boston, MA	Tie	17–17
75	October 23, 1982	Princeton, NJ	Harvard	27–15
76	October 22, 1983	Boston, MA	Harvard	28–26
77	October 27, 1984	Princeton, NJ	Harvard	17–15
78	October 26, 1985	Boston, MA	Princeton	11–6
79	October 25, 1986	Princeton, NJ	Princeton	14–3
80	October 24, 1987	Boston, MA	Harvard	24–19
81	October 22, 1988	Princeton, NJ	Princeton	23–8
82	October 28, 1989	Boston, MA	Princeton	28–14
83	October 20, 1990	Princeton, NJ	Harvard	23–20
84	October 26, 1991	Boston, MA	Harvard	24–21
85	October 24, 1992	Princeton, NJ	Princeton	21–6
86	October 23, 1993	Boston, MA	Princeton	21–10
87	October 22, 1994	Princeton, NJ	Princeton	18–7
88	October 21, 1995	Boston, MA	Princeton	14–3
89	October 26, 1996	Princeton, NJ	Harvard	24–0
90	October 25, 1997	Boston, MA	Harvard	14–12
91	October 24, 1998	Princeton, NJ	Harvard	23–22
92	October 23, 1999	Boston, MA	Harvard	13–6
93	October 21, 2000	Princeton, NJ	Harvard	35–21
94	October 20, 2001	Boston, MA	Harvard	28–26
95	October 26, 2002	Princeton, NJ	Harvard	24–17
96	October 25, 2003	Boston, MA	Harvard	43–40^{2OT}
97	October 23, 2004	Princeton, NJ	Harvard	39–14
98	October 22, 2005	Boston, MA	Princeton	27–24
99	October 21, 2006	Princeton, NJ	Princeton	34–31
100	October 20, 2007	Boston, MA	Harvard	27–10
101	October 25, 2008	Princeton, NJ	Harvard	24–20
102	October 24, 2009	Boston, MA	Harvard	37–3
103	October 23, 2010	Princeton, NJ	Harvard	45–28
104	October 22, 2011	Boston, MA	Harvard	56–39
105	October 20, 2012	Princeton, NJ	Princeton	39–34
106	October 26, 2013	Boston, MA	Princeton	51–48^{3OT}
107	October 25, 2014	Princeton, NJ	Harvard	49–7
108	October 24, 2015	Boston, MA	Harvard	42–7
109	October 22, 2016	Princeton, NJ	Harvard	23–20^{OT}
110	October 20, 2017	Boston, MA	Princeton	52–17
111	October 20, 2018	Boston, MA	Princeton	29–21
112	October 26, 2019	Princeton, NJ	Princeton	30–24
113	October 23, 2021	Princeton, NJ	Princeton	18–16^{5OT}
114	October 21, 2022	Boston, MA	Princeton	37–10
115	October 21, 2023	Princeton, NJ	Princeton	21–14
116	October 26, 2024	Boston, MA	Harvard	45–14
117	October 25, 2025	Princeton, NJ	Harvard	35–14
118	October 24, 2026	Boston, MA	Harvard	35–7
Series: Princeton leads 60–51–7

== See also ==
- List of NCAA college football rivalry games
- List of most-played college football series in NCAA Division I
