= Penn–Princeton football rivalry =

American college football rivalry

- Penn Quakers Princeton Tigers
- First meeting: November 11, 1876; Princeton 6, Penn 0
- Latest meeting: November 21, 2026; Penn 19, Princeton 12
- Next meeting: November 20, 2027

Statistics
- Total meetings: 117
- All-time series: Princeton leads, 71–45–1
- Largest victory: Princeton, 95–0 (1887)
- Longest win streak: Princeton, 28 (1876–1891)
- Current win streak: Penn, 2 (2025–present)

Locations of Penn and Princeton

The Penn–Princeton football rivalry is an American college football rivalry between the Penn Quakers and Princeton Tigers.

== History ==
Princeton won the first 28 contests in this rivalry that started in 1876. It is the 5th oldest football rivalry in the Ivy League. (Columbia–Yale:1872; Princeton–Yale:1873; Columbia–Princeton:1874; Harvard–Yale: 1875; Penn–Princeton:1876; Columbia–Princeton:1877; Harvard–Princeton:1877; Columbia–Penn:1878; Penn–Yale:1879; Brown–Yale:1880; Harvard–Penn:1881; Dartmouth–Harvard:1882 and Dartmouth–Yale:1884). The contest was suspended from 1895 until 1935. Since the resumption of the series Penn has won 42 games and Princeton has won 40 games with one game ending in a tie (1942). Since the Ivy League was officially formed in 1956 Princeton has won 34 games and Penn has won 33 games. Penn and Princeton have played 117 times since 1876. Beginning in 2018 Penn and Princeton will play against each other in the final game of the season.

== Game results ==
Penn victories	Princeton victories	Tie games

No.	Date	Location	Winner	Score
1	November 11, 1876	University Field	Princeton	6–0
2	November 25, 1876	Princeton, N.J.	Princeton	6–0
3	October 19, 1878	Princeton, N.J.	Princeton	2–0
4	November 9, 1878	University Field	Princeton	2–1
5	October 18, 1879	Princeton, N.J.	Princeton	6–0
6	November 6, 1880	Princeton, N.J.	Princeton	1–0
7	October 29, 1881	University Field	Princeton	7–0
8	November 5, 1881	Princeton, N.J.	Princeton	4–0
9	October 28, 1882	Recreation Park	Princeton	8–0
10	November 11, 1882	University Field	Princeton	10–0
11	November 3, 1883	Princeton, N.J.	Princeton	39–6
12	October 25, 1884	Recreation Par	Princeton	31–0
13	October 24, 1885	University Field	Princeton	57–0
14	October 31, 1885	Princeton, N.J.	Princeton	80–10
15	November 26, 1885	University Field	Princeton	76–10
16	October 16, 1886	Princeton, N.J.	Princeton	30–0
17	October 23, 1886	University Field	Princeton	55–9
18	November 6, 1886	University Field	Princeton	28–6
19	October 19, 1887	University Field	Princeton	57–0
20	October 22, 1887	Princeton, N.J.	Princeton	42–0
21	November 5, 1887	University Field	Princeton	95–0
22	October 10, 1888	Princeton, N.J.	Princeton	63–0
23	October 20, 1888	Princeton, N.J.	Princeton	38–0
24	November 10, 1888	University Field	Princeton	4–0
25	October 26, 1889	University Field	Princeton	72–4
26	October 15, 1890	Princeton, N.J.	Princeton	18–0
27	November 8, 1890	Princeton, N.J.	Princeton	6–0
28	November 7, 1891	Germantown Cricket Club	Princeton	24–0
29	November 5, 1892	Germantown Cricket Club	Penn	6–4
30	November 4, 1893	Germantown Cricket Club	Princeton	4–0
31	November 10, 1894	Trenton, N.J.	Penn	12–0
32	October 5, 1935	Palmer Stadium	Princeton	7–6
33	October 17, 1936	Franklin Field	Penn	7–0
34	October 15, 1938	Palmer Stadium	Princeton	13–0
35	October 19, 1940	Franklin Field	Penn	46–28
36	October 18, 1941	Palmer Stadium	Penn	23–0
37	October 17, 1942	Franklin Field	Tie	6–6
38	September 25, 1943	Franklin Field	Penn	47–9
39	November 3, 1945	Franklin Field	Penn	28–0
40	November 2, 1946	Franklin Field	Princeton	17–14
41	November 1, 1947	Palmer Stadium	Penn	26–7
42	October 9, 1948	Franklin Field	Penn	29–7
43	October 8, 1949	Palmer Stadium	Penn	14–13
44	October 13, 1951	Franklin Field	Princeton	13–7
45	October 11, 1952	Palmer Stadium	Penn	13–7
46	October 9, 1954	Palmer Stadium	Princeton	13–7
47	October 8, 1955	Franklin Field	Princeton	7–0
48	October 13, 1956	Franklin Field	Princeton	34–0
49	October 12, 1957	Palmer Stadium	Princeton	13–9
50	October 11, 1958	Franklin Field	Princeton	20–14
51	October 10, 1959	Palmer Stadium	Penn	18–0
52	October 8, 1960	Franklin Field	Princeton	21–0
53	October 14, 1961	Palmer Stadium	Princeton	9–3
54	October 13, 1962	Franklin Field	Princeton	21–8
55	October 12, 1963	Palmer Stadium	Princeton	34–0
56	October 24, 1964	Franklin Field	Princeton	55–0
57	October 23, 1965	Palmer Stadium	Princeton	51–0
58	October 22, 1966	Franklin Field	Princeton	30–13
59	October 28, 1967	Palmer Stadium	Princeton	28–14
60	October 26, 1968	Franklin Field	Penn	19–14

No.	Date	Location	Winner	Score
61	October 25, 1969	Palmer Stadium	Princeton	42–0
62	October 24, 1970	Franklin Field	Princeton	22–16
63	October 23, 1971	Palmer Stadium	Princeton	31–0
64	October 28, 1972	Franklin Field	Penn	15–10
65	October 27, 1973	Palmer Stadium	Penn	24–0
66	October 26, 1974	Franklin Field	Penn	20–18
67	October 25, 1975	Palmer Stadium	Penn	24–20
68	October 30, 1976	Palmer Stadium	Penn	10–9
69	October 29, 1977	Franklin Field	Penn	21–10
70	November 4, 1978	Palmer Stadium	Princeton	21–0
71	November 3, 1979	Franklin Field	Princeton	38–10
72	November 1, 1980	Palmer Stadium	Princeton	28–21
73	October 31, 1981	Franklin Field	Princeton	38–30
74	October 30, 1982	Palmer Stadium	Princeton	17–14
75	October 29, 1983	Franklin Field	Penn	28–27
76	November 3, 1984	Palmer Stadium	Penn	27–17
77	November 2, 1985	Franklin Field	Penn	31–21
78	November 1, 1986	Palmer Stadium	Penn	23–10
79	October 31, 1987	Franklin Field	Princeton	17–7
80	October 29, 1988	Palmer Stadium	Penn	31–23
81	November 4, 1989	Franklin Field	Princeton	30–8
82	November 3, 1990	Palmer Stadium	Princeton	34–20
83	November 9, 1991	Franklin Field	Princeton	17–12
84	November 7, 1992	Palmer Stadium	Princeton	20–14
85	November 6, 1993	Franklin Field	Penn	30–14
86	November 5, 1994	Palmer Stadium	Penn	33–19
87	November 4, 1995	Franklin Field	Princeton	22–9
88	November 9, 1996	Palmer Stadium	Penn	10–6
89	November 8, 1997	Franklin Field	Penn†	20–17
90	November 7, 1998	Princeton Stadium	Penn	27–14
91	November 6, 1999	Franklin Field	Penn	41–13
92	November 4, 2000	Princeton Stadium	Penn	40–24
93	November 3, 2001	Franklin Field	Penn	21–10
94	November 9, 2002	Princeton Stadium	Penn	44–13
95	November 8, 2003	Franklin Field	Penn	37–7
96	November 6, 2004	Princeton Stadium	Penn	16–15
97	November 5, 2005	Franklin Field	Princeton	30–13
98	November 4, 2006	Princeton Stadium	Princeton	31–30
99	November 1, 2007	Franklin Field	Penn	7–0
100	November 8, 2008	Princeton Stadium	Penn	14–9
101	November 7, 2009	Franklin Field	Penn	42–7
102	November 6, 2010	Princeton Stadium	Penn	52–10
103	November 5, 2011	Franklin Field	Penn	37–9
104	November 3, 2012	Princeton Stadium	Penn	28–21
105	November 9, 2013	Franklin Field	Princeton	38–26
106	November 8, 2014	Princeton Stadium	Princeton	22–17
107	November 7, 2015	Franklin Field	Penn	26–23^{OT}
108	November 5, 2016	Princeton Stadium	Princeton	28–0
109	November 4, 2017	Franklin Field	Penn	38–35
110	November 17, 2018	Princeton Stadium	Princeton	42–14
111	November 23, 2019	Franklin Field	Princeton	28–7
112	November 20, 2021	Franklin Field	Princeton	34–14
113	November 19, 2022	Princeton Stadium	Penn	20–19
114	November 18, 2023	Franklin Field	Princeton	31–24
115	November 23, 2024	Princeton Stadium	Princeton	20–17
116	November 22, 2025	Franklin Field	Penn	17–6
117	November 21, 2026	Princeton Stadium	Penn	19–12
Series: Princeton leads 71–45–1
† Penn forfeited.

== See also ==
- List of NCAA college football rivalry games
- List of most-played college football series in NCAA Division I
- Penn–Princeton men's basketball rivalry
