= Powers Field at Princeton Stadium =

Sports venue at Princeton University

Coordinates: 40.345755°N 74.65003°W

Princeton Stadium
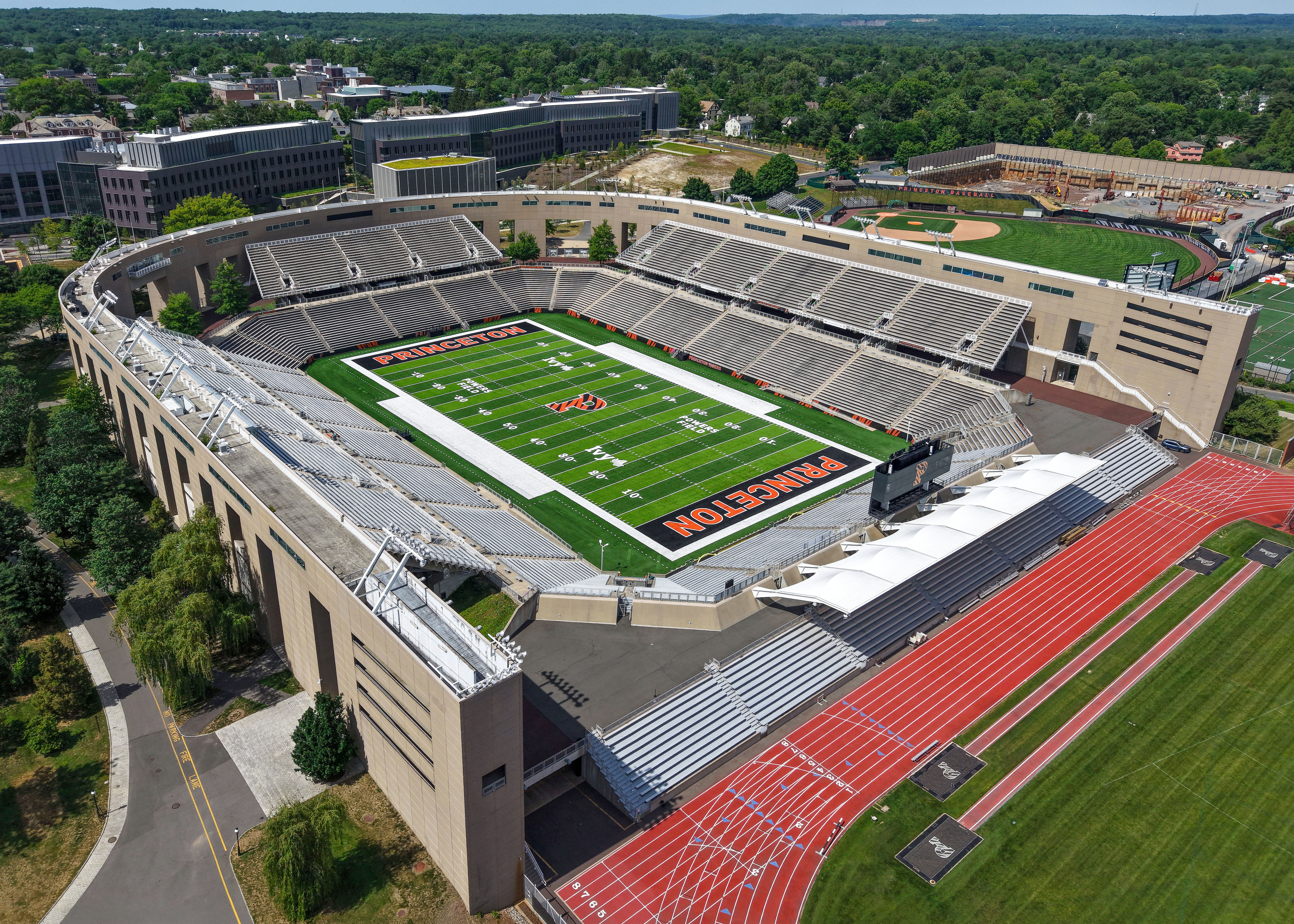
- The stadium in 2026
- Interactive map of Princeton Stadium
- Full name: Powers Field at Princeton Stadium
- Address: Princeton, New Jersey; United States
- Owner: Princeton University
- Operator: Princeton University
- Capacity: 27,800
- Surface: AstroTurf (2025–present); FieldTurf (2006–2025); Grass (1998–2005)

Construction
- Groundbreaking: 1997
- Opened: September 19, 1998; 28 years ago
- Cost: $45 million ($88.9 million in 2025 dollars)
- Architect: Rafael Viñoly Architects

Tenant
- Princeton Tigers (NCAA) (1998–present)

Website
- goprincetontigers.com/stadium

Powers Field at Princeton Stadium is a stadium in Princeton, New Jersey, United States. It is primarily used for American football, and has been the home field of the Princeton Tigers since 1998. The stadium seats 27,800 with room for up to 30,000. Since 2007, the stadium has been known as Powers Field at Princeton Stadium after a donation from alumnus William C. Powers.

Princeton Stadium was viewed as a long-overdue replacement for Palmer Stadium, the Tigers' former home, an 83-year-old "dinosaur". It sits on the same site as its predecessor; because of the demolition and construction work, the Tigers played all of their 1997 games on the road.

The stadium opened September 19, 1998, as a capacity crowd of 27,800 witnessed the Tigers defeat Cornell, 6-0.

== Design ==
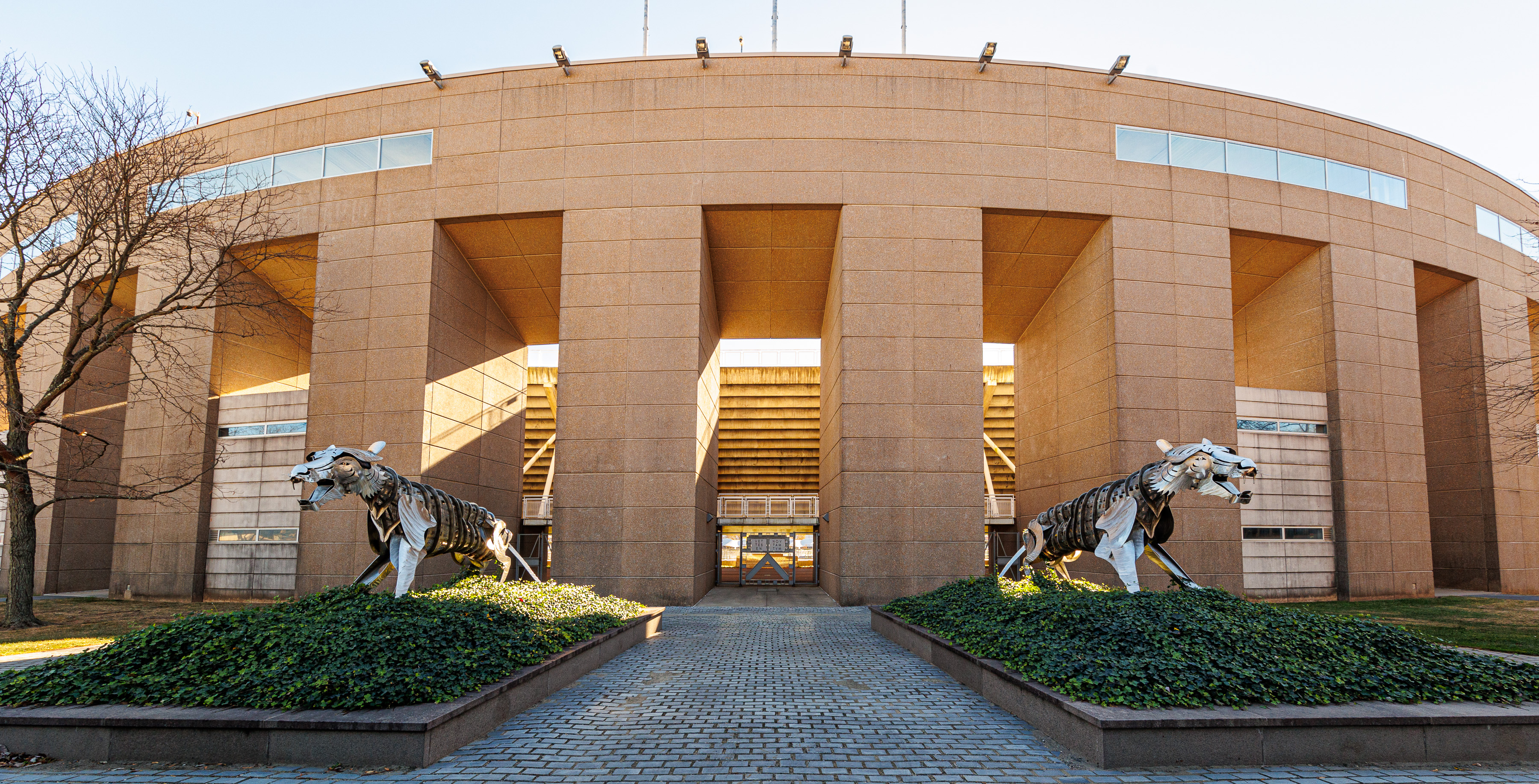
Stadium exterior

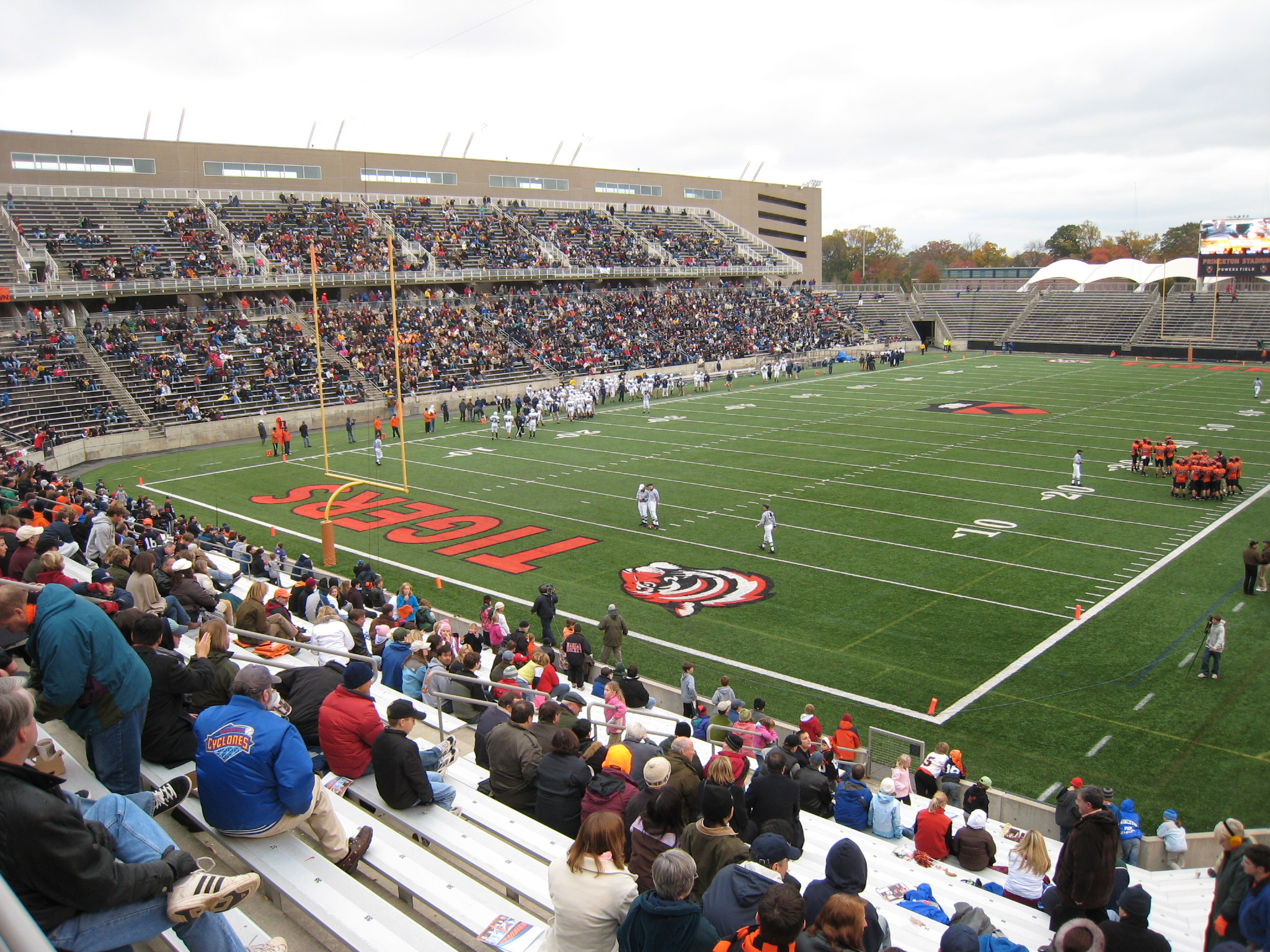
Yale Bulldogs at Princeton, 2007

The stadium's exterior shell mirrors the layout of Palmer Stadium, and the grandstands are four sided, with a second deck added on all sides except the south. The press box and luxury boxes are located above the west-side upper deck. One of the stadium's structural pillars houses the university's rock-climbing wall, which opened in the fall of 2008. In addition to the stadium itself, the construction project included building a track to the immediate south of the football field, which shares the stadium's south end facilities. Previously, the track was inside the stadium.

For most of its first decade, Princeton Stadium had a natural grass surface. Since 2006, the facility has featured FieldTurf. The heightened resiliency of the artificial surface allows the football team to conduct its spring practice in the stadium. Princeton's sprint football team holds most of its practices inside the stadium, while the football team holds practices on the neighboring Campbell and Finney fields.

In 2017, thanks to an anonymous $3.5 million donation, the stadium was equipped with an air structure (called "the bubble") that lays on the whole field and enables indoor activities.

== Naming ==
While under construction, the stadium was referred to simply as "Princeton University Stadium", as the university hoped an alumnus would step forward to purchase the naming rights for a "leadership gift" of at least $25 million. Princeton officials said they would not name the stadium after a corporation, but considered honoring a Princeton graduate in exchange for a donation to be in keeping with their naming standards for other university buildings.

Naming rights remained unsold by the time the stadium opened in September 1998, though the stadium's name was shortened to "Princeton Stadium" in time for the first football game. The offer to name the stadium after a donor still applied.

Though the stadium's name did not change, the playing field was dedicated as Powers Field in 2007 to honor investor William C. Powers (then a managing director at Pacific Investment Management), whose $10 million donation funded the installation of artificial FieldTurf in 2006, as well as renovations of two practice fields. Powers, a 1979 graduate of Princeton, was a standout defensive back and punter for the Tigers.

== Records ==
Since the stadium's opening, only two Princeton Tigers have rushed for over 200 yards in a single game at home: Cameron Atkinson ran for 233 yards against Dartmouth on November 23, 2002, and all-Ivy junior running back Jordan Culbreath rushed for 276 yards against Dartmouth on November 22, 2008.

== See also ==
- List of NCAA Division I FCS football stadiums
