= 2018 Celebration Bowl =

College football bowl game

2018 Air Force Reserve Celebration Bowl
- 4th Celebration Bowl
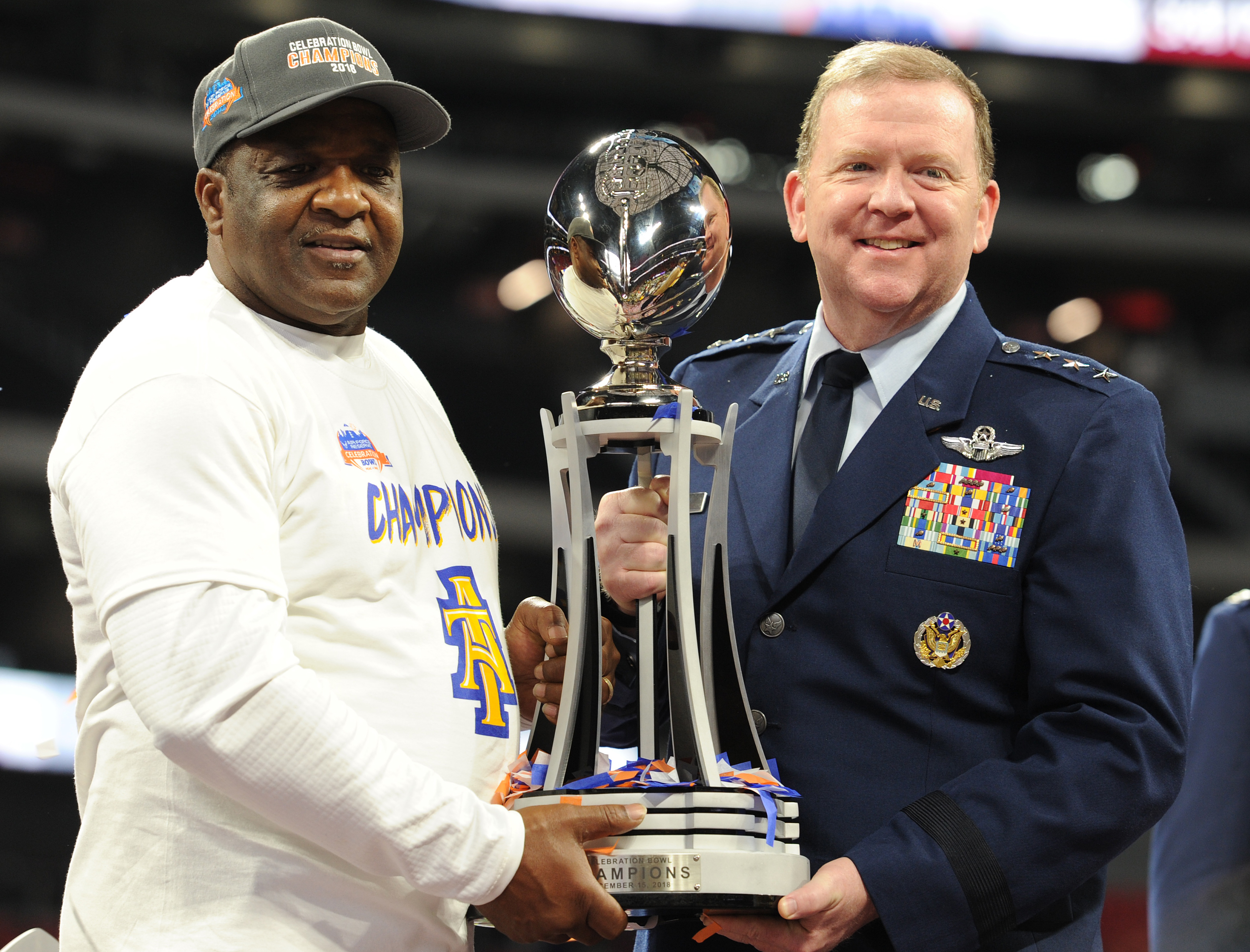
- Coach Sam Washington receiving the 2018 Celebration Bowl trophy from Richard W. Scobee
North Carolina A&T Aggies	Alcorn State Braves
(9–2)	(9–3)
MEAC	SWAC
24	22
Head coach: Sam Washington	Head coach: Fred McNair
STATS 11	STATS —
	1	2	3	4	Total
North Carolina A&T	7	10	7	0	24
Alcorn State	3	3	10	6	22
- Date: December 15, 2018
- Season: 2018
- Stadium: Mercedes-Benz Stadium
- Location: Atlanta, Georgia
- MVP: Lamar Raynard (QB, NC A&T) & Richie Kittle (DB, NC A&T)
- Favorite: North Carolina A&T by 7.5
- Referee: Justin Elliot (Conference USA)
- Attendance: 31,672 (tickets sold); 20,069 (head count)

United States TV coverage
- Network: ABC & Gameday Radio
- Announcers: Mark Jones, Dusty Dvoracek, Jay Walker, Molly McGrath, and Roddy Jones (ABC); Andy Demetra, Randy McMichael, and Lericia Harris (Gameday Radio)

International TV coverage
- Network: ESPN Deportes
- Announcers: Roger Valdivieso and Alex Pambo

The 2018 Air Force Reserve Celebration Bowl was a college football bowl game that was played on December 15, 2018, with kickoff at 12:00 p.m. EST. It was the first game of the 2018–19 bowl season, and the only bowl to feature FCS teams. It was the fourth edition of the Celebration Bowl and the final game of the 2018 NCAA Division I FCS football season for the participating teams. The Air Force Reserve resumed its role as the title sponsor after a one-year absence.

In the game, the North Carolina A&T Aggies, champions of the Mid-Eastern Athletic Conference, defeated the Alcorn State Braves, champions of the Southwestern Athletic Conference, 24–22.

== Teams ==
The participants for the game are based upon the final regular season standings which determine the Mid-Eastern Athletic Conference (MEAC) football champion, and the Southwestern Athletic Conference (SWAC) football championship game that determines the representative from that conference.

=== North Carolina A&T Aggies ===
The North Carolina A&T Aggies (NC A&T) were announced as the MEAC representative on November 17, following the conclusion of games involving itself and Florida A&M (FAMU), the conference front-runners. As outlined in the conference tiebreaker rules, due to defeating NC A&T earlier in the season, a FAMU victory at the Florida Classic would have given the Rattlers the Celebration Bowl bid and at least a share of the MEAC championship regardless of the outcome of NC A&T's game. However, FAMU lost the Florida Classic to arch-rival Bethune-Cookman, 33–19, while NC A&T defeated North Carolina Central, 45–0, giving them the conference championship and Celebration Bowl bid.

NC A&T, led by first-year head coach Sam Washington, entered the season ranked number 14 in the AFCA preseason poll, number 13 in the STATS FCS top 25 poll, and number one in the BoxtoRow polls as the defending HBCU National Champions. The Aggies were also unanimously picked as the favorites to repeat as MEAC champions. The Aggies finished their 2018 regular season at 9–2 (6–1 in MEAC)—with key victories over Ohio Valley Conference champion Jacksonville State and in-state FBS foe East Carolina—and entered the Celebration Bowl ranked number 11 by STATS. This was the third Celebration Bowl appearance for NC A&T, following their victory over the Grambling Tigers in the 2017 Celebration Bowl, 21–14.

=== Alcorn State Braves ===
Alcorn State defeated Southern in the SWAC Championship Game on December 1 to secure their berth in the Celebration Bowl. Led by third-year head coach Fred McNair, the Braves were ranked third in the BoxtoRow HBCU preseason poll, voted to win the SWAC East division. The Braves enter the bowl with a 9–3 record (6–1 in conference regular season play).

== Game summary ==
=== Scoring summary ===
Scoring summary

Quarter	Time	Drive			Team	Scoring information	Score	
Quarter	Time	Plays	Yards	TOP	Team	Scoring information	NCAT	ALCN
1	12:38	5	65	2:22	NCAT	Zachary Leslie 17-yard touchdown reception from Lamar Raynard, Noel Ruiz kick good	7	0
1	2:52	15	84	7:12	ALCN	29-yard field goal by Corey McCullough	7	3
2	8:33	4	8	1:01	NCAT	36-yard field goal by Noel Ruiz	10	3
2	0:53	6	70	2:30	NCAT	Elijah Bell 27-yard touchdown reception from Lamar Raynard, Noel Ruiz kick good	17	3
2	0:00	8	67	0:53	ALCN	25-yard field goal by Corey McCullough	17	6
3	4:29	4	86	1:08	ALCN	Noah Johnson 30-yard touchdown run, Corey McCullough kick good	17	13
3	0:51	5	53	0:55	ALCN	29-yard field goal by Corey McCullough	17	16
3	0:38				NCAT	Malik Wilson 79-yard kickoff return for touchdown, Noel Ruiz kick good	24	16
4	11:55	9	92	3:36	ALCN	Noah Johnson 59-yard touchdown run, 2-point pass failed	24	22
"TOP" = time of possession. For other American football terms, see Glossary of American football.							24	22

=== Statistics ===
	1	2	3	4	Total
Aggies	7	10	7	0	24
Braves	3	3	10	6	22

Statistics	NCAT	ALCN
First downs	17	20
Plays–yards	62–324	68–451
Rushes–yards	31–38	39–328
Passing yards	286	123
Passing: Comp–Att–Int	19–31–1	12–29–1
Time of possession	32:02	27:58

Team	Category	Player	Statistics
North Carolina A&T	Passing	Lamar Raynard	18/30, 292 yds, 2 TD, 1 INT
North Carolina A&T	Rushing	Jah-Maine Martin	10 car, 31 yds
North Carolina A&T	Receiving	Zachary Leslie	6 rec, 119 yds, 1 TD
Alcorn State	Passing	Noah Johnson	11/27, 128 yds, 1 INT
Alcorn State	Rushing	De'Shawn Waller	19 car, 167 yds
Alcorn State	Receiving	Juan Anthony	5 rec, 75 yds
