= Sam Washington =

American football player and coach (born 1960)

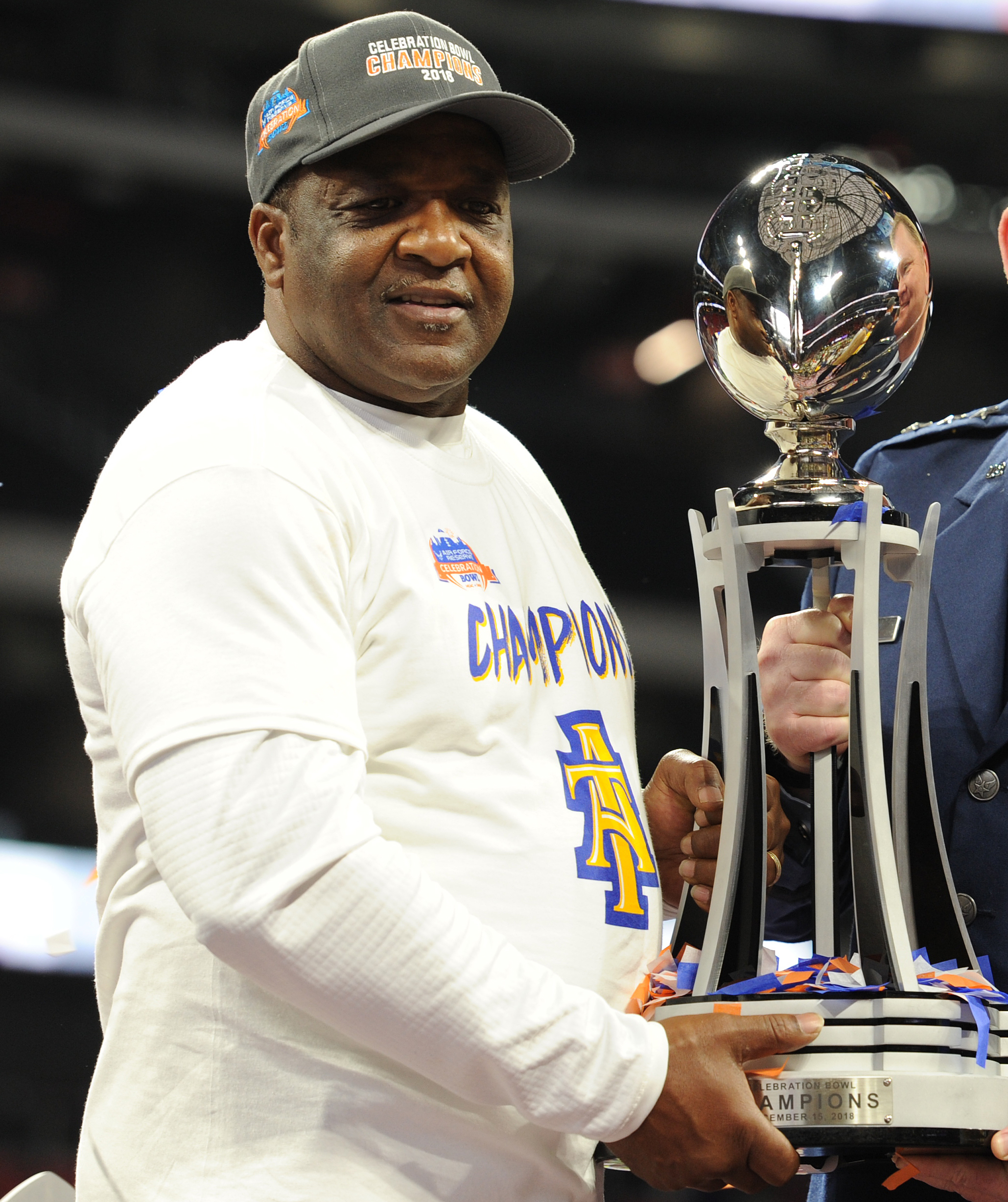
- Washington at the 2018 Celebration Bowl

No. 41
- Position: Head coach

Personal information
- Born: March 7, 1960 (age 66); Tampa, Florida, U.S.
- Listed height: 5 ft 8 in (1.73 m)
- Listed weight: 180 lb (82 kg)

Career information
- High school: Tampa Bay Technical (Tampa)
- College: Mississippi Valley State
- NFL draft: 1982: undrafted

Career history

Playing
- Pittsburgh Steelers (1982–1985); Cincinnati Bengals (1985)

Coaching
- Bethune–Cookman (1987–1991) Defensive backs coach; Johnson C. Smith (1992) Assistant head coach, defensive coordinator, special teams coordinator, defensive backs coach; North Carolina Central (1993–2000) Assistant head coach, defensive coordinator; North Carolina A&T (2001) Special teams coordinator; Mississippi Valley State (2002–2006) Assistant head coach, defensive coordinator, defensive backs coach; Grambling State (2007–2010) Defensive backs coach; North Carolina A&T (2011–2017) Defensive coordinator; North Carolina A&T (2018–2022) Head coach

Awards and highlights
- MEAC Coach of the Year (2018)

Career NFL statistics
- Interceptions: 7
- Defensive touchdowns: 2
- Stats at Pro Football Reference

Head coaching record
- Regular season: 31–15 (.674)

Samuel Lee Washington Jr. (born March 7, 1960) is an American football coach and former defensive back who was the head football coach at North Carolina A&T State University. Originally from Tampa, Florida, Washington played college football at Mississippi Valley State. After signing with the Pittsburgh Steelers as an undrafted free agent, he played four seasons in the National Football League (NFL) for the Steelers and Cincinnati Bengals from 1982 to 1985.

Washington has been a football coach since 1987, beginning as defensive backs coach at Bethune–Cookman. He later held defensive coordinator positions at multiple other historically black universities, including North Carolina Central, North Carolina A&T, Mississippi Valley State, and Grambling State. Washington turned around a struggling defensive unit at Mississippi Valley State to one of the best in the Southwestern Athletic Conference and elevated the Grambling State defense to the upper tier of NCAA Division I FCS.

After seven seasons as defensive coordinator at North Carolina A&T, Washington became head coach in 2018. His first two seasons had a cumulative 19–5 record, back-to-back black college football national championships, and top 25 FCS rankings. After the 2020 season was canceled due to COVID-19, the football program moved from its longtime home in the Mid-Eastern Athletic Conference to the Big South Conference in 2021.

== Early life and college career ==
Born and raised in Tampa, Florida, Washington graduated from Tampa Bay Technical High School in 1978. Washington then attended Mississippi Valley State University, where he played at cornerback for the Mississippi Valley State Delta Devils football team.

== Pro football career ==
Washington signed with the Pittsburgh Steelers as an undrafted free agent after the 1982 NFL draft. He played four games in 1982 as a rookie. Then in 1983, Washington played all 16 games as a reserve and had his first career interception. Washington played and started 14 games in 1984 with a career high six interceptions for 139 yards including two returned for touchdowns.

After seven games with the Steelers in 1985, Washington was traded to the Cincinnati Bengals, where he played eight games and had a fumble recovery.

== Coaching career ==
=== Assistant coach (1987–2017) ===
From 1987 to 1991, Washington was defensive backs coach at Bethune–Cookman, helping Bethune–Cookman win the 1988 Mid-Eastern Athletic Conference (MEAC) championship. In 1992, Washington was assistant head coach, defensive coordinator, and special teams coordinator at Johnson C. Smith University, where he was also the head track and field coach. Then from 1993 to 2000, Washington was defensive coordinator and assistant head coach at North Carolina Central.

Washington's first job at North Carolina A&T was in 2001 as special teams coordinator under head coach Bill Hayes. Then from 2002 to 2006, Washington returned to his alma mater as assistant head coach, defensive coordinator, and defensive backs coach at Mississippi Valley State, turning around one of the worst defenses in the Southwestern Athletic Conference into the second best.

From 2007 to 2010, Washington was defensive backs coach at Grambling State Tigers under head coach Rod Broadway. The 2007 Grambling State team had the no. 12 total defense in all of NCAA Division I FCS. Then in 2008, Grambling State was the FCS leader in turnover margin and third in scoring defense. Following Broadway, Washington returned to North Carolina A&T in 2011 to become defensive coordinator and secondary coach, positions he would hold for seven years.

=== North Carolina A&T head coach (2018–2022) ===
Following the retirement of Broadway, Washington was promoted to head coach at North Carolina A&T on January 9, 2018.

In his first season in 2018, Washington led A&T to a 10–2 record. On September 2, North Carolina A&T defeated East Carolina 28–23, marking the third straight season A&T defeated an FBS opponent. A&T's Twitter video of Washington's postgame locker room speech was widely shared; it ended with Washington remarking, "tell 'em to bring me my money." North Carolina A&T received a $330,000 payment from East Carolina for the game. A&T finished the season with a MEAC co-championship, 2018 Celebration Bowl title, black college football national championship, and year-end rankings in both FCS polls (no. 12 STATS, no. 11 AFCA Coaches).

Then in 2019, A&T went 9–3 for a second straight MEAC title. The team went on to win the 2019 Celebration Bowl and defended their black college national championship as a result.

North Carolina A&T did not play in the 2020 season. In July 2020, the MEAC suspended all fall sports due to COVID-19. Although a spring 2021 season was an option, the MEAC declined to hold a football championship, so A&T decided not to compete at all in what would have been the last season before the athletics program would move to the Big South Conference.

In 2021, A&T's first season in the Big South, A&T finished 5–6.

== Head coaching record ==
| Year | Team | Overall | Conference | Standing | Bowl/playoffs | STATS^{#} | Coaches^{°} |
|---|---|---|---|---|---|---|---|
North Carolina A&T Aggies (Mid-Eastern Athletic Conference) (2018–2020)
| 2018 | North Carolina A&T | 10–2 | 6–1 | 1st | W Celebration | 12 | 11 |
| 2019 | North Carolina A&T | 9–3 | 6–2 | T–2nd* | W Celebration | 23 | 22 |
| 2020–21 | No team—COVID-19 | | | | | | |
North Carolina A&T Aggies (Big South Conference) (2021–2022)
| 2021 | North Carolina A&T | 5–6 | 3–4 | T–3rd | | | |
| 2022 | North Carolina A&T | 7–4 | 4–1 | 2nd | | | |
| North Carolina A&T: | | 31–15 | 19–8 | *conf champs in 2019 due to NCAA sanctions on Florida A&M | | | |
| Total: | | 31–15 | | | | | |
National championship Conference title Conference division title or championship game berth
