= 2018 Norfolk State Spartans football team =

American college football season

2018 Norfolk State Spartans football
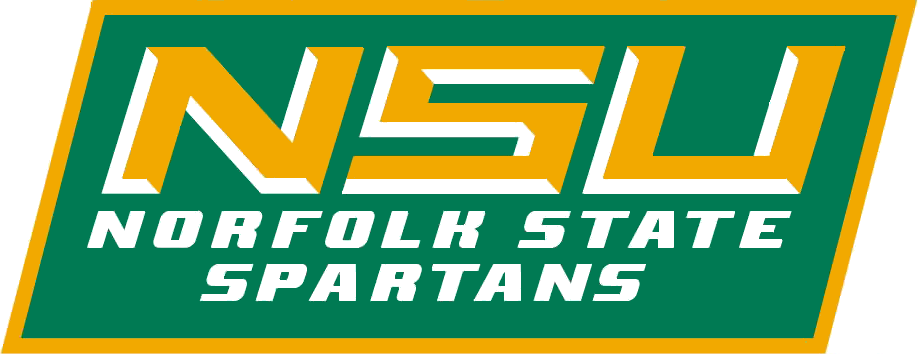
- Conference: Mid-Eastern Athletic Conference
- Record: 4–7 (2–5 MEAC)
- Head coach: Latrell Scott (4th season)
- Defensive coordinator: Matt Dawson (2nd season)
- Home stadium: William "Dick" Price Stadium

2018 Mid-Eastern Athletic Conference football standings
	Conf.			Overall
Team	W		L	W		L
No. 12 North Carolina A&T $	6	–	1	9	–	2
Bethune–Cookman	5	–	2	7	–	5
Florida A&M	5	–	2	6	–	5
South Carolina State	4	–	3	5	–	6
Howard	4	–	3	4	–	6
North Carolina Central	3	–	4	5	–	6
Morgan State	3	–	4	4	–	7
Norfolk State	2	–	5	4	–	7
Delaware State	2	–	5	3	–	8
Savannah State	1	–	6	2	–	8
$ – Conference champion; Rankings from STATS Poll

The 2018 Norfolk State Spartans football team represented Norfolk State University in the 2018 NCAA Division I FCS football season. They were led by third-year head coach Latrell Scott and played their home games at William "Dick" Price Stadium. They were a member of the Mid-Eastern Athletic Conference (MEAC). They finished the season 4–7, 2–5 in MEAC play to finish in a tie for eighth place.

== Preseason ==
=== MEAC preseason poll ===
In a vote of the MEAC head coaches and sports information directors, the Spartans were picked to finish in sixth place.

=== Preseason All-MEAC Teams ===
The Spartans had seven players at eight positions selected to the preseason all-MEAC teams.

Offense

2nd team

Marcus Taylor – WR

Wes Jones – C

Kenneth Kirby – OL

3rd team

Aaron Savage – RB

Defense

1st team

Nigel Chavis – LB

2nd team

J.T. Wahee – DB

3rd team

Deshaywn Middleton – DL

Special teams

1st team

Marcus Taylor – RS

== Schedule ==
Date	Time	Opponent	Site	TV	Result	Attendance
September 1	6:00 p.m.	Virginia State*	William "Dick" Price Stadium; Norfolk, VA	ESPN3	W 34–13	15,173
September 8	6:00 p.m.	No. 2 James Madison*	William "Dick" Price Stadium; Norfolk, VA	ESPN3	L 0–17 (Note: The JMU–Norfolk State game was mutually ended after first quarter due to inclement weather.)	6,482
September 22	6:00 p.m.	at South Carolina State*	Oliver C. Dawson Stadium; Orangeburg, SC	ESPN3	W 17–7	7,820
September 29	4:00 p.m.	Delaware State	William "Dick" Price Stadium; Norfolk, VA	ESPN3	W 54–28	7,103
October 6	4:00 p.m.	at Florida A&M	Bragg Memorial Stadium; Tallahassee, FL	ESPN3	L 0–17	26,045
October 20	2:00 p.m.	North Carolina Central	William "Dick" Price Stadium; Norfolk, VA	ESPN3	L 6–36	15,012
October 27	3:00 p.m.	at Savannah State	Ted Wright Stadium; Savannah, GA	ESPN3	L 3–32	7,812
November 3	1:00 p.m.	at No. 17 North Carolina A&T	BB&T Stadium; Greensboro, NC	ESPN3	L 20–37	21,500
November 10	1:00 p.m.	Howard	William "Dick" Price Stadium; Norfolk, VA	ESPN3	W 29–17	6,004
November 17	1:00 p.m.	Morgan State	William "Dick" Price Stadium; Norfolk, VA	ESPN3	L 27–44	3,437
December 1 (Note: Game originally scheduled for September 15, but moved in anticipation of Hurricane Florence.)	2:00 p.m.	at Liberty*	Williams Stadium; Lynchburg, VA	ESPN3	L 17–52	13,243
*Non-conference game; Rankings from STATS Poll released prior to the game; All times are in Eastern time

- Source: Schedule

Despite also being a member of the MEAC, the game vs South Carolina State will be considered a non-conference game and have no effect on the MEAC standings.

== Game summaries ==
=== Virginia State ===
	1	2	3	4	Total
Trojans	7	0	6	0	13
Spartans	7	3	7	17	34

=== James Madison ===
	1	2	3	4	Total
No. 2 Dukes	17				17
Spartans	0				0

Due to inclement weather, the JMU–Norfolk State game was mutually ended after the first quarter.

=== At South Carolina State ===
	1	2	3	4	Total
Spartans	7	7	0	3	17
Bulldogs	0	0	7	0	7

=== Delaware State ===
	1	2	3	4	Total
Hornets	0	0	14	14	28
Spartans	6	21	20	7	54

=== At Florida A&M ===
	1	2	3	4	Total
Spartans	0	0	0	0	0
Rattlers	0	3	0	14	17

=== North Carolina Central ===
	1	2	3	4	Total
Eagles	3	9	7	17	36
Spartans	0	0	0	6	6

=== At Savannah State ===
	1	2	3	4	Total
Spartans	0	3	0	0	3
Tigers	7	10	7	8	32

=== At North Carolina A&T ===
	1	2	3	4	Total
Spartans	10	7	3	0	20
No. 17 Aggies	7	14	6	10	37

=== Howard ===
	1	2	3	4	Total
Bison	10	0	7	0	17
Spartans	3	13	3	10	29

=== Morgan State ===
	1	2	3	4	Total
Bears	10	14	7	13	44
Spartans	6	0	0	21	27

=== At Liberty ===
	1	2	3	4	Total
Spartans	3	7	0	7	17
Flames	10	28	7	7	52

This game was originally scheduled for September 15, but was moved to December 1 due to Hurricane Florence.

== Coaching staff ==
2018 Norfolk State Spartans coaching staff
Head coach: Head coach – Latrell Scott; Offensive coaches: Associate head coach/tight ends – Andrew Faison; Wide receivers/special teams – Dyrell Roberts; Assistant head coach/running backs – B.T. Sherman; Offensive line– Kris Sweet; Tight ends – Josh Firm; Defensive coaches: Defensive coordinator/inside linebackers – Matt Dawson; Defensive backs – Cordell Taylor; Outside linebackers – Zach Tenuta; Defensive line – Justin Williamson; Administrative staff: Director of football operations – Shawn Hunt; Source: Last updated 7/13/18
