= Ernest T. Jones =

American football player and coach (born 1970)

Biographical details
- Born: January 18, 1970 (age 56)

Playing career
- 1994–1995: Alcorn State
- Position: Wide receiver

Coaching career (HC unless noted)
- 2000–2003: Concordia (MN) (DB)
- 2003: Kentucky State (DB)
- 2004: Oberlin (DC)
- 2005–2006: Central Michigan (DB/RB)
- 2007: Cincinnati (RB)
- 2008: Alcorn State
- 2010: Buffalo (associate HC)
- 2014: Connecticut (RB)
- 2015: ASA College
- 2016–2017: Morgan State (DC)
- 2018: Morgan State (interim HC)

Administrative career (AD unless noted)
- 2009: Cincinnati (Director of Player Services)
- 2011–2013: Notre Dame (Director of Player Development)

Head coaching record
- Overall: 6–17

Ernest T. Jones (born January 18, 1970) is an American football coach. He was briefly running backs coach for the University of Connecticut Huskies football team. He was head football coach at Alcorn State University. He was named the head football coach after the 2007 season and served as head coach in 2008. He was controversially fired from this position in December 2008. He returned to the University of Cincinnati as the Director of Player Services in 2009. For the 2010 he will be an assistant coach at the University at Buffalo under former University of Cincinnati assistant coach and now UB head football Coach Jeff Quinn.

Jones is an alumnus of Alcorn State and a former wide receiver on the Braves' football team. Prior to receiving the head coach position, Jones served as an assistant at Concordia University, Kentucky State University, Oberlin College, Central Michigan University and the University of Cincinnati.

== Head coaching record ==
Year	Team	Overall	Conference	Standing	Bowl/playoffs
Alcorn State Braves (Southwestern Athletic Conference) (2008)
2008	Alcorn State	2–10	1–6	T–4th (East)	
Alcorn State:		2–10	1–6		
Morgan State Bears (Mid-Eastern Athletic Conference) (2018)
2018	Morgan State	4–7	3–4	T–6th	
Morgan State:		4–7	3–4		
Total:		6–17			
