= Granville Eastman =

American football coach

Current position
- Title: Safeties coach
- Team: Kennesaw State
- Conference: CUSA

Playing career
- 1989–1992: Saint Mary's (NS)
- Position: Defensive back

Coaching career (HC unless noted)
- 1994–1995: York (ON) (DB)
- 1996–1998: Arkansas State (GA)
- 1999: Tiffin (DB)
- 2000: Tiffin (DC/DL)
- 2001–2002: Tiffin (DC/DB)
- 2003–2004: Austin Peay (ST/DB)
- 2005–2006: Austin Peay (DC/ST/OLB/S)
- 2007–2009: Austin Peay (DC/ST/DB)
- 2010: Austin Peay (DC/ST/LB)
- 2011–2012: Austin Peay (DC/S)
- 2013: Austin Peay (AHC/DC/S)
- 2014–2017: North Carolina Central (AHC/DC/S)
- 2018: North Carolina Central (interim HC)
- 2019–2021: Alabama A&M (DC)
- 2022–2023: Hoover HS (AL) (DC)
- 2024 (spring): Alabama A&M (DL/DE)
- 2024: Rice (RC)
- 2025–present: Kennesaw State (S)

Head coaching record
- Overall: 5–6

Granville Eastman is an American college football coach. He is a safeties coach for Kennesaw State University. He was the interim head football coach for North Carolina Central University in 2018. He also coached for York (ON), Arkansas State, Tiffin, Austin Peay, Hoover High School, and a previous stint with Alabama A&M. He played college football for Saint Mary's (NS) as a defensive back.

== Head coaching record ==
Year	Team	Overall	Conference	Standing	Bowl/playoffs
North Carolina Central Eagles (Mid-Eastern Athletic Conference) (2018)
2018	North Carolina Central	5–6	3–4	T–6th	
North Carolina Central:		5–6	3–4		
Total:		5–6			
