= 2018 North Carolina Central Eagles football team =

American college football season

2018 North Carolina Central Eagles football
- Conference: Mid-Eastern Athletic Conference
- Record: 5–6 (3–4 MEAC)
- Head coach: Granville Eastman (interim, 1st season)
- Offensive coordinator: T. C. Taylor (4th season)
- Defensive coordinator: Granville Eastman (5th season)
- Home stadium: O'Kelly–Riddick Stadium

2018 Mid-Eastern Athletic Conference football standings
	Conf.			Overall
Team	W		L	W		L
No. 12 North Carolina A&T $	6	–	1	9	–	2
Bethune–Cookman	5	–	2	7	–	5
Florida A&M	5	–	2	6	–	5
South Carolina State	4	–	3	5	–	6
Howard	4	–	3	4	–	6
North Carolina Central	3	–	4	5	–	6
Morgan State	3	–	4	4	–	7
Norfolk State	2	–	5	4	–	7
Delaware State	2	–	5	3	–	8
Savannah State	1	–	6	2	–	8
$ – Conference champion; Rankings from STATS Poll

The 2018 North Carolina Central Eagles football team represented North Carolina Central University as a member of the Mid-Eastern Athletic Conference (MEAC) during the 2018 NCAA Division I FCS football season. Led by Granville Eastman in his first and only season as interim head coach, the Eagles compiled an overall record of 5–6 with a mark of 3–4, tying for sixth place in the MEAC. North Carolina Central played home games at O'Kelly–Riddick Stadium in Durham, North Carolina.

== Preseason ==
=== Award watch lists ===
Award	Player	Position	Year
Buck Buchanan Award	Davanta Reynolds	S	SR

=== MEAC preseason poll ===
In a vote of the MEAC head coaches and sports information directors, the Eagles were picked to finish in third place.

=== Preseason All-MEAC Teams ===
The Eagles had nine players selected to the preseason all-MEAC teams. Defensive back Davanta Reynolds was selected as the preseason defensive player of the year.

Offense

1st team

Isaiah Totten – RB

Nick Leverett – OL

2nd team

Josh McCoy – TE

Andrew Dale – OL

3rd team

Xavier McKoy – WR

Defense

1st team

Kawuan Cox – DL

Davanta Reynolds – DB

2nd team

Randy Anyanwu – DL

3rd team

De'Mario Evans – DB

== Schedule ==
Date	Time	Opponent	Site	TV	Result	Attendance
September 2	12:00 p.m.	vs. Prairie View A&M*	Georgia State Stadium; Atlanta, GA (MEAC/SWAC Challenge)	ESPN2	L 24–40	10,274
September 8	6:00 p.m.	St. Augustine's*	O'Kelly–Riddick Stadium; Durham, NC	NSN	W 51–14	6,142
September 22	3:30 p.m.	at Duke*	Wallace Wade Stadium; Durham, NC	ACCN Extra	L 13–55	30,477
September 29	4:00 p.m.	Florida A&M	O'Kelly–Riddick Stadium; Durham, NC	ESPN3	L 14–55	8,451
October 6	2:00 p.m.	Howard	O'Kelly–Riddick Stadium; Durham, NC	ESPN3	W 40–35	6,702
October 20	2:00 p.m.	at Norfolk State	William "Dick" Price Stadium; Norfolk, VA		W 36–6	13,186
October 27	2:00 p.m.	at Delaware State	Alumni Stadium; Dover, DE		L 13–28	1,466
November 3	2:00 p.m.	Edward Waters*^{†}	O'Kelly–Riddick Stadium; Durham, NC	ESPN3	W 52–12	11,968
November 8	4:00 p.m.	at Bethune–Cookman	Daytona Stadium; Daytona Beach, FL	ESPNU	L 25–28 ^{2OT}	3,145
November 17	2:00 p.m.	No. 12 North Carolina A&T	O'Kelly–Riddick Stadium; Durham, NC (rivalry)	ESPN3	L 0–45	11,055
November 24 (Note: Game originally scheduled for September 15, but moved in anticipation of Hurricane Florence.)	12:30 pm	at South Carolina State	Oliver C. Dawson Stadium; Orangeburg, SC		W 21–17	3,996
*Non-conference game; ^{†}Homecoming; Rankings from STATS Poll released prior to the game; All times are in Eastern time

== Game summaries ==
=== vs Prairie View A&M ===
	1	2	3	4	Total
Panthers	20	3	3	14	40
Eagles	0	7	14	3	24

=== St. Augustine's ===
	1	2	3	4	Total
Falcons	0	7	0	7	14
Eagles	14	9	14	14	51

=== At Duke ===
	1	2	3	4	Total
Eagles	7	6	0	0	13
Blue Devils	20	7	21	7	55

=== Florida A&M ===
	1	2	3	4	Total
Rattlers	24	17	7	7	55
Eagles	7	0	7	0	14

=== Howard ===
	1	2	3	4	Total
Bison	5	14	7	9	35
Eagles	7	17	7	9	40

=== At Norfolk State ===
	1	2	3	4	Total
Eagles	0	0	0	6	6
Spartans	3	9	7	17	36

=== At Delaware State ===
	1	2	3	4	Total
Eagles	0	7	0	6	13
Hornets	14	7	0	7	28

=== Edward Waters ===
	1	2	3	4	Total
Tigers	0	0	0	12	12
Eagles	14	3	21	14	52

=== At Bethune–Cookman ===
	1	2	3	4	OT	Total
Eagles	6	10	0	6	3	25
Wildcats	2	6	7	7	6	28

=== North Carolina A&T ===
	1	2	3	4	Total
No.12 Aggies	14	10	14	7	45
Eagles	0	0	0	0	0

=== At South Carolina State ===
	1	2	3	4	Total
Eagles	0	0	7	14	21
Bulldogs	0	10	0	7	17
