= 2018 Howard Bison football team =

American college football season

2018 Howard Bison football
- Conference: Mid-Eastern Athletic Conference
- Record: 4–6 (4–3 MEAC)
- Head coach: Mike London (2nd season)
- Offensive coordinator: Brennan Marion (2nd season)
- Defensive coordinator: Vince Brown (2nd season)
- Home stadium: William H. Greene Stadium

2018 Mid-Eastern Athletic Conference football standings
	Conf.			Overall
Team	W		L	W		L
No. 12 North Carolina A&T $	6	–	1	9	–	2
Bethune–Cookman	5	–	2	7	–	5
Florida A&M	5	–	2	6	–	5
South Carolina State	4	–	3	5	–	6
Howard	4	–	3	4	–	6
North Carolina Central	3	–	4	5	–	6
Morgan State	3	–	4	4	–	7
Norfolk State	2	–	5	4	–	7
Delaware State	2	–	5	3	–	8
Savannah State	1	–	6	2	–	8
$ – Conference champion; Rankings from STATS Poll

The 2018 Howard Bison football team represented Howard University as a member of the Mid-Eastern Athletic Conference (MEAC) during the 2017 NCAA Division I FCS football season. Led by Mike London in his second and final season as head coach, the Bison compiled an overall record of 4–6 with a mark of 4–3, tying for fourth place in the MEAC. Howard played home games at William H. Greene Stadium in Washington, D.C.

On November 19, London resigned to become the head coach at the College of William & Mary. He finished his two-year tenure at Howard with a record of 11–10.

== Preseason ==
=== MEAC preseason poll ===
In a vote of the MEAC head coaches and sports information directors, the Bison were picked to finish in second place.

=== Preseason All-MEAC Teams ===
The Bison had nine players at ten positions selected to the preseason all-MEAC teams.

Offense

1st team

Jequez Ezzard – WR

James Homon – C

Tyrone Ramsey – OL

2nd team

Caylin Newton – QB

Kyle Anthony – WR

Defense

2nd team

Marcellus Allison – LB

Bryan Cook – DB

3rd team

Aaron Motley – DL

Special teams

2nd team

Jaquez Ezzard – RS

3rd team

Dakota Lebofsky – K

== Schedule ==
Date	Time	Opponent	Site	TV	Result	Attendance
September 1	2:00 p.m.	at Ohio*	Peden Stadium; Athens, OH	ESPN+	L 32–38	18,275
September 8	3:30 p.m.	at Kent State*	Dix Stadium; Kent, OH	ESPN+	L 14–54	15,242
September 15	1:00 p.m.	Savannah State*	William H. Greene Stadium; Washington, DC		Canceled (Note: This game was originally postponed in anticipation of Hurricane Florence, until being cancelled on November 16, 2018.)	
September 22	4:30 p.m.	vs. Bethune–Cookman	Lucas Oil Stadium; Indianapolis, IN (Circle City Classic)	ESPN3	W 41–35	19,712
October 6	2:00 p.m.	at North Carolina Central	O'Kelly–Riddick Stadium; Durham, NC	ESPN3	L 35–40	6,702
October 13	1:00 p.m.	Delaware State	William H. Greene Stadium; Washington, DC	ESPN3	W 55–13	4,473
October 20	7:00 p.m.	at Morgan State	Hughes Stadium; Baltimore, MD (rivalry)	SPORTSfever TV	W 35–26	3,078
October 27	1:00 p.m.	South Carolina State^{†}	William H. Greene Stadium; Washington, DC	ESPN3	L 21–27	7,501
November 3	1:00 p.m.	Florida A&M	William H. Greene Stadium; Washington, DC		W 31–23	6,858
November 10	1:00 p.m.	at Norfolk State	William "Dick" Price Stadium; Norfolk, VA	ESPN3	L 17–29	6,004
November 17	1:00 p.m.	Bryant*	William H. Greene Stadium; Washington, DC	ESPN3	L 55–56	3,974
*Non-conference game; ^{†}Homecoming; All times are in Eastern time

Despite Howard and Savannah State both being members of the Mid-Eastern Athletic Conference (MEAC), the game between two on September 15 was considered a non-conference game.

== Game summaries ==
=== At Ohio ===
	1	2	3	4	Total
Bison	10	12	7	3	32
Bobcats	3	14	14	7	38

=== At Kent State ===
	1	2	3	4	Total
Bison	0	0	14	0	14
Golden Flashes	16	10	21	7	54

=== vs Bethune–Cookman ===
	1	2	3	4	Total
Bison	14	14	13	0	41
Wildcats	14	14	0	7	35

=== At North Carolina Central ===
	1	2	3	4	Total
Bison	5	14	7	9	35
Eagles	7	17	7	9	40

=== Delaware State ===
	1	2	3	4	Total
Hornets	0	6	0	7	13
Bison	23	18	7	7	55

=== At Morgan State ===
	1	2	3	4	Total
Bison	6	14	0	15	35
Bears	10	9	7	0	26

=== South Carolina State ===
	1	2	3	4	Total
Bulldogs	7	13	0	7	27
Bison	0	7	0	14	21

=== Florida A&M ===
	1	2	3	4	Total
Rattlers	10	7	0	6	23
Bison	21	0	7	3	31

=== At Norfolk State ===
	1	2	3	4	Total
Bison	10	0	7	0	17
Spartans	3	13	3	10	29

=== Bryant ===
	1	2	3	4	Total
Bulldogs	14	21	7	14	56
Bison	14	21	0	20	55

== Coaching staff ==
2018 Howard Bison coaching staff
Head coach: Head coach – Mike London; Offensive coaches: Offensive coordinator/quarterbacks – Brennan Marion; Running backs/special teams – Kenny Lucas; Offensive line/run game coordinator – Darryl Bullock; Wide receivers – Mike London Jr.; H-back/slot receivers – David Clowney; Defensive coaches: Defensive coordinator/linebackers/assistant head coach – Vince Brown; Safeties – Cato June; Defensive line – Keenan Carter; Cornerbacks – Ras-I Dowling; Administrative staff: Director of football operations – Bryce Bevill; Source: Last updated 7/13/18
