= 2018 North Carolina A&T Aggies football team =

American college football season

2018 North Carolina A&T Aggies football

Black college national champion MEAC champion Celebration Bowl champion

Celebration Bowl, W 24–22 vs. Alcorn State
- Conference: Mid-Eastern Athletic Conference

Ranking
- STATS: No. 12
- FCS Coaches: No. 11
- Record: 10–2 (6–1 MEAC)
- Head coach: Sam Washington (1st season)
- Offensive coordinator: Chris Barnette (1st season)
- Offensive scheme: Multiple pro-style
- Defensive coordinator: Courtney Coard (1st season)
- Base defense: 4–2–5
- Home stadium: BB&T Stadium

2018 Mid-Eastern Athletic Conference football standings
| | Conf. | | | Overall |
| Team | W | | L | W | | L |
|---|---|---|---|---|---|---|
| No. 12 North Carolina A&T $ | 6 | – | 1 | 9 | – | 2 |
| Bethune–Cookman | 5 | – | 2 | 7 | – | 5 |
| Florida A&M | 5 | – | 2 | 6 | – | 5 |
| South Carolina State | 4 | – | 3 | 5 | – | 6 |
| Howard | 4 | – | 3 | 4 | – | 6 |
| North Carolina Central | 3 | – | 4 | 5 | – | 6 |
| Morgan State | 3 | – | 4 | 4 | – | 7 |
| Norfolk State | 2 | – | 5 | 4 | – | 7 |
| Delaware State | 2 | – | 5 | 3 | – | 8 |
| Savannah State | 1 | – | 6 | 2 | – | 8 |
$ – Conference champion; Rankings from STATS Poll

The 2018 North Carolina A&T Aggies football team represented North Carolina Agricultural and Technical State University as member of the Mid-Eastern Athletic Conference (MEAC) in the 2018 NCAA Division I FCS football season. This season marked the 95th for the program, which was led by first-year head coach Sam Washington. The Aggies finished the season with a record of 9–2 and 6–1 in MEAC play, capturing their tenth conference title. The Aggies also earned an invitation to the Celebration Bowl where they defeated Southwestern Athletic Conference champion Alcorn State, earning their sixth black college football national championship. The Aggies played their home games at the newly renamed BB&T Stadium. They are a member of the Mid-Eastern Athletic Conference (MEAC).

== Before the season ==
At the conclusion of the 2017 football season, the Aggies lost key players such as three-time MEAC Offensive Lineman of the year and two-time All-American Brandon Parker, two-time first-team All-MEAC center Darriel Mack & Khris Gardin, who finished his career second all-time in NCAA history in punt return yards. The Aggies also lost third-team all-MEAC outside linebacker Marcus Albert, Jeremy Taylor & two-time first-team All-MEAC safety/linebacker Jeremy Taylor, who was the team's leading tackler in 2017. In addition to the players, the program lost head coach Rod Broadway, who is the program's all-time leader in winning percentage. Broadway decided to retire in January after weeks of speculation following the team's undefeated season and national championship.

=== Recruiting ===
Prior to National Signing Day in February 2018, three players enrolled for the spring semester in order to participate in spring practice. On National Signing Day, A&T signed 15 additional players out of high school that completed the 2018 recruiting class. Of the class, 9 players were from North Carolina, including three players from Greensboro.

College recruiting (2018)
| Name | Hometown | School | Height | Weight | Commit date |
|---|---|---|---|---|---|
| Michael Branch; DL | Greensboro, NC | Presbyterian | 6 ft 2 in (1.88 m) | 300 lb (140 kg) | Feb 2, 2018 |
| Michael Branch; DL | Recruit ratings: No ratings found | | | | |
| Khalil Gilliam; QB | Charlotte, NC | East Mecklenburg HS | 6 ft 3 in (1.91 m) | 192 lb (87 kg) | ??? |
| Khalil Gilliam; QB | Recruit ratings: No ratings found | | | | |
| Tevaughn Higgins; ATH | Hopkins, SC | Lower Richland HS | 6 ft 3 in (1.91 m) | 205 lb (93 kg) | ??? |
| Tevaughn Higgins; ATH | Recruit ratings: No ratings found | | | | |
| KeAndre Jones; LB | Columbia, SC | Spring Valley HS | 6 ft 0 in (1.83 m) | 240 lb (110 kg) | Jan 31, 2018 |
| KeAndre Jones; LB | Recruit ratings: No ratings found | | | | |
| Lawrence Lagrone; G | Douglasville, GA | Douglas County HS | 6 ft 3 in (1.91 m) | 320 lb (150 kg) | |
| Lawrence Lagrone; G | Recruit ratings: No ratings found | | | | |
| Jah-Maine Martin; RB | Conway, SC | Coastal Carolina | 5 ft 10 in (1.78 m) | 210 lb (95 kg) | Dec 21, 2017 |
| Jah-Maine Martin; RB | Recruit ratings: No ratings found | | | | |
| Justin Nwachukwu; DT | Wake Forest, NC | Northern Illinois | 6 ft 1 in (1.85 m) | 296 lb (134 kg) | Jan 31, 2018 |
| Justin Nwachukwu; DT | Recruit ratings: No ratings found | | | | |
| Michael Rivers; P/K | Wilmington, NC | North Brunswick HS | 6 ft 1 in (1.85 m) | 165 lb (75 kg) | Feb 7, 2018 |
| Michael Rivers; P/K | Recruit ratings: No ratings found | | | | |
| Zareik Rush; OLB | Greensboro, NC | Dudley HS | 6 ft 2 in (1.88 m) | 205 lb (93 kg) | |
| Zareik Rush; OLB | Recruit ratings: Rivals: | | | | |
| Miles Simon; DB | Lenoir, NC | Hibriten HS | 6 ft 0 in (1.83 m) | 190 lb (86 kg) | Feb 2, 2018 |
| Miles Simon; DB | Recruit ratings: No ratings found | | | | |
| Isreal Spivey; WR | Ellenwood, GA | Cedar Grove HS | 5 ft 9 in (1.75 m) | 165 lb (75 kg) | Feb 2, 2018 |
| Isreal Spivey; WR | Recruit ratings: No ratings found | | | | |
| Joseph Stuckey; OLB | Hillside, NJ | Hillside HS (Milford Academy) | 6 ft 0 in (1.83 m) | 210 lb (95 kg) | Feb 2, 2018 |
| Joseph Stuckey; OLB | Recruit ratings: No ratings found | | | | |
| Wiz Vaughn; FS | Wilmington, NC | New Hanover HS | 5 ft 11 in (1.80 m) | 170 lb (77 kg) | Jan 30, 2018 |
| Wiz Vaughn; FS | Recruit ratings: No ratings found | | | | |
| Tim Williams; T | Laurinburg, NC | Scotland HS | 6 ft 5 in (1.96 m) | 295 lb (134 kg) | Feb 6, 2018 |
| Tim Williams; T | Recruit ratings: No ratings found | | | | |
Overall recruit ranking:
Note: In many cases, Scout, Rivals, 247Sports, On3, and ESPN may conflict in their listings of height and weight.; In these cases, the average was taken. ESPN grades are on a 100-point scale.; Sources: "2018 Team Ranking". Rivals.com.

=== Award watch lists ===
| Award | Player | Position | Year |
|---|---|---|---|
| Walter Payton Award | Lamar Raynard | QB | SR |

=== MEAC preseason poll ===
In a vote of the MEAC head coaches and sports information directors, the Aggies were unanimously picked as the favorites to win the MEAC championship receiving 19 of 20 first place votes (coaches are not allowed to vote for their own team).

=== Preseason All-MEAC Teams ===
The Aggies had nine players selected to the preseason all-MEAC teams. Quarterback Lamar Raynard was selected as the preseason offensive player of the year.

Offense

1st team

Lamar Raynard – QB

Marquell Cartwright – RB

Elijah Bell – WR

Leroy Hill – TE

Marcus Pettiford – OL

Defense

1st team

Darryl Johnson, Jr. – DL

Timadre Abram – DB

Mac McCain – DB

2nd team

Julian McKnight – DL

== Schedule ==
North Carolina A&T's game against fellow Mid-Eastern Athletic Conference (MEAC) member Morgan State was considered a non-conference game and did figured in the conference standings.

| Date | Time | Opponent | Rank | Site | TV | Result | Attendance |
|---|---|---|---|---|---|---|---|
| August 25 | 7:00 p.m. | vs. No. 6 Jacksonville State* | No. 14 | Crampton Bowl; Montgomery, AL (FCS Kickoff) | ESPN | W 20–17 | 13,500 |
| September 2 (Note: The game against East Carolina was originally scheduled for September 1 at 6:00 p.m. before being postponed to September 2 at 3:30 p.m. due to inclement weather.) | 3:30 p.m. | at East Carolina* | No. 14 | Dowdy–Ficklen Stadium; Greenville, NC | ESPN3 | W 28–23 | 38,640 |
| September 8 | 6:00 p.m. | Gardner–Webb* | No. 5 | BB&T Stadium; Greensboro, NC | ESPN3/LTV | W 45–6 | 13,111 |
| September 22 | 6:00 p.m. | Morgan State* | No. 4 | BB&T Stadium; Greensboro, NC | LTV | L 13–16 | 15,909 |
| September 27 | 7:00 p.m. | South Carolina State | No. 12 | BB&T Stadium; Greensboro, NC (rivalry) | ESPNU | W 31–16 | 11,530 |
| October 6 | 7:00 p.m. | at Delaware State | No. 11 | Alumni Stadium; Dover, DE | ESPN3 | W 34–6 | 2,951 |
| October 13 | 1:00 p.m. | Florida A&M | No. 10 | BB&T Stadium; Greensboro, NC | LTV | L 21–22 | 15,418 |
| October 20 | 4:00 p.m. | at Bethune–Cookman | No. 19 | Daytona Stadium; Daytona Beach, FL | LTV | W 35–10 | 6,225 |
| November 3 | 1:00 p.m. | Norfolk State^{†} | No. 17 | BB&T Stadium; Greensboro, NC | LTV | W 37–20 | 21,500 |
| November 10 | 1:00 p.m. | at Savannah State | No. 14 | Ted Wright Stadium; Savannah, GA | ESPN3 | W 28–12 | 4,788 |
| November 17 | 2:00 p.m. | at North Carolina Central | No. 12 | O'Kelly–Riddick Stadium; Durham, NC (rivalry) | ESPN3 | W 45–0 | 11,055 |
| December 15 | 12:00 p.m. | vs. Alcorn State* | No. 11 | Mercedes-Benz Stadium; Atlanta, GA (Celebration Bowl) | ABC | W 24–22 | 31,672 |
*Non-conference game; ^{†}Homecoming; Rankings from STATS Poll released prior to the game; All times are in Eastern time

== Roster ==
2018 North Carolina A&T Aggies Roster (Source)
| Wide receivers: 3 Chance Pride – Freshman; 4 Isaiah Hicklin – (redshirt) Senior; 13 Elijah Bell – Junior; 15 Ahmed Bah – (redshirt) Sophomore; 19 Zachary Leslie – (redshirt) Sophomore; 23 Amos Williams – (redshirt) Senior; 80 Isreal Spivey – Freshman; 81 Ron Hunt – Junior; 84 Quinzel Lockhart – (redshirt) Freshman; 85 Terrence Peterson – (redshirt) Senior; 86 Jordan McDaniel – (redshirt) Freshman; 88 Malik Wilson – (redshirt) Senior; 89 Rashad Bovian – (redshirt) Sophomore; Offensive line: 55 Dacquari Wilson – (redshirt) Freshman; 60 Lawrence Lagrone –Freshman; 61 Tyshawn Miller – (redshirt) Freshman; 62 Malik Johnson -Senior; 63 Jeremiah Martin - (redshirt) Sophomore; 65 De'jour Simpson – Junior; 66 Arlander Cherry – (redshirt) Junior; 68 Macquel Hardy – Senior; 69 Deven Milton – (redshirt) Sophomore; 72 Tim Williams – Freshman; 73 Marcus Pettiford – (redshirt) Junior; 74 Sylvester Smith – (redshirt) Junior; 75 Bilal Ali – (redshirt) Sophomore; 76 Trajan Douthit – (redshirt) Sophomore; 77 Breontae Matthews – Graduate Student; 78 Micah Shaw – Senior; 79 Dontae Keys – (redshirt) Freshman; Tight ends: 12 TeVaughn Higgins – Freshman; 82 jarvis Reid – Junior; 87 Leroy Hill – (redshirt) Senior; Fullbacks: 46 William Hollingsworth – Senior; 49 William Simpson – (redshirt) Junior | Quarterbacks: 1 Jalen Fowler – (redshirt) Freshman; 7 Lamar Raynard – Senior; 10 Kylil Carter – Senior; 11 Carnaji Andrews – (redshirt) Freshamn; 16 Khalil Gilliam – Freshman; Running backs: 22 Marquell Cartwright – (redshirt) Senior; 25 Kashon Baker – Junior; 26 Darius Graves – (redshirt) Sophomore; 30 Jah-Maine Martin – (redshirt) Sophomore; 37 Unique Johnson – (redshirt) Freshman; Fullbacks: 46 William Hollingsworth – Sophomore; 49 William Simpson – (redshirt) Sophomore; Defensive line: 41 Leon "Tre" Smalls – (redshirt) Junior; 50 Devin Harrell – Sophomore; 52 Michael Branch – Junior; 90 Karfa Kaba – (redshirt) Freshman; 91 Justin Nwachukwu – Junior; 92 Jermaine Williams – (redshirt) Junior; 94 Justin Cates – Senior; 95 Julian McKnight – (redshirt) Senior; 97 Shomari Wallace – Sophomore; 99 Artavious Richardson – (redshirt) Freshman; Defensive ends: 40 Darryl Johnson Jr. – (redshirt) Junior; 96 Sam Blue – (redshirt) Senior; 98 Kadarius Kendrick – (redshirt) Junior; Rovers: 2 Jamaal Darden – (redshirt) Senior; 8 Joseph Stuckey – Freshman; 39 Keifer Oates – (redshirt) Freshman | Linebackers: 5 Kiaundric Richardson – (redshirt) Senior; 27 Justin Phillip - (redshirt) Sophomore; 34 Deion Jones – (redshirt) Senior; 36 Antoine Wilder – (redshirt) Junior; 38 Davis Rogers – (redshirt) Freshman; 43 Chris Williams – Freshman; 44 Julius Reynolds – (redshirt) Senior; 45 KeAndre Jones – Freshman; 48 Zareik Rush – Freshman; 41 Leon "Tre" Smalls – (redshirt) Sophomore; 44 Julius Reynolds – (redshirt) Junior; 45 Joshua Patrick – Senior; 48 Jeremy Taylor – (redshirt) Senior; 52 Kiaundric Richardson – (redshirt) Junior; 53 Julian Monell – Freshman; 54 Kyin Howard – (redshirt) Freshman; 56 Tyler Beck – (redshirt) Sophomore; 57 Markeiss Blue – (redshirt) Senior; 58 Adrian McPherson – (redshirt) Junior; 59 Elijah Westbrook – (redshirt) Junior; Defensive backs: 14 Timadre Abram – (redshirt) Senior; 18 Richie Kittles – (redshirt) Junior; 20 Najee Reams – (redshirt) Sophomore; 21 Derrek Williams – (redshirt) Sophomore; 24 Amir McNeil – (redshirt) Freshman; 29 Mac McCain – (redshirt) Sophomore; 32 Marquis Willis – (redshirt) Junior; 32 Miles Simon – Freshamn; 33 Jalon Bethea – (redshirt) Junior; 42 Will Jones – (redshirt) Freshamn; Punters: 60 James Mackey – (redshirt) Junior; 47 Michael Rivers – Freshman; Kickers: 35 Noel Ruiz – Sophomore; 38 Davis Rogers – Freshman; Long snappers: 51 John Davis – Sophomore; 67 Ernest (Petie) Bush III – (redshirt) Junior |
† Starter at position * Injured; did not play in 2018.

== Coaching staff ==
2018 North Carolina A&T Aggies coaching staff
| Head coach: Head coach – Sam Washington; Offensive coaches: Offensive coordinator/wide receivers –; Quarterbacks – Chris Barnette; Running backs – Shawn Gibbs; Tight end – Colin Williams; Defensive coaches: Defensive coordinator/defensive backs – Courtney Coard; Inside linebackers – Thomas Howard | Administrative staff: Athletic Director (A.D.) – Earl M. Hilton III; Administrative support associate for football – Jeraldine Bailey |

== Game summaries ==
=== Vs. Jacksonville State ===
Jacksonville State Gamecocks vs North Carolina A&T Aggies – FCS Kickoff

| Quarter | 1 | 2 | 3 | 4 | Total |
|---|---|---|---|---|---|
| No. 6 Gamecocks | 0 | 3 | 14 | 0 | 17 |
| No. 14 Aggies | 7 | 0 | 13 | 0 | 20 |

at Crampton Bowl • Montgomery, AL

- Date: August 25
- Game time: 7:00 p.m. ET
- Game weather: Temperature: 87 °F (31 °C) • Wind: E 6 mph • Weather: Mostly clear
- Game attendance: 13,500
- Referee: Andy Faust
- TV: ESPN
- ESPN Box Score

Game information

First Quarter

- (6:31) NCAT TD: Zachary Leslie 24 yard pass from Lamar Raynard (Noel Ruiz kick)
  Aggies 7–0, 9 plays, 65 yards, 4:38

Second Quarter

- (3:55) JSU FG: Cade Stinnett 23 yard field goal
  Aggies 7–3, 10 plays, 57 yards, 4:00

Third Quarter

- (6:13) JSU TD: Daniel Byrd 49 yard pass from Zerrick Cooper (Cade Stinnett kick)
  Gamecocks 10–7, 3 plays, 75 yards, 0:58
- (5:57) NCAT TD: Malik Wilson 98 yard kickoff return (Noel Ruiz kick)
  Aggies 14–10
- (4:49) JSU TD: Josh Pearson 40 yard pass from Zerrick Cooper (Cade Stinnett kick)
  Gamecocks 17–14, 3 plays, 65 yards, 1:08
- (2:36) NCAT TD: Elijah Bell 4 yard pass from Lamar Raynard (Noel Ruiz kick failed)
  Aggies 20–17, 5 plays, 31 yards, 2:13

Fourth Quarter
No scoring

Top Passers

- JSU – Zerrick Cooper: 24–38, 320 yds, 2 TD, 1 INT
- NCAT – Lamar Raynard: 12–34, 111 yds, 2 TD, 1 INT

Top Rushers

- JSU – Jaelen Greene: 12 car, 43 yds
- NCAT – Marquell Cartwright: 25 car, 58 yds

Top Receivers

- JSU – Josh Pearson: 8 rec, 147 yds, 1 TD
- NCAT – Zachary Leslie: 3 rec, 43 yds, 1 TD

Top Tacklers

- JSU – Jalen Choice: 3 solo, 6 assisted (9 total); 1.5 TFL
- NCAT – Jamaal Darden: 6 solo, 4 assisted (10 total)

=== At East Carolina ===
The Aggies upset East Carolina, 28–23, and in the post-game celebration, head coach Sam Washington declared in response to the team being a so-called "buy game" for the Pirates: "Tell them to bring me my money." The statement and ensuing celebration has since become an internet meme.

North Carolina A&T Aggies at East Carolina Pirates

| Quarter | 1 | 2 | 3 | 4 | Total |
|---|---|---|---|---|---|
| No. 14 Aggies | 7 | 7 | 0 | 14 | 28 |
| Pirates | 3 | 14 | 3 | 3 | 23 |

at Dowdy–Ficklen Stadium • Greenville, NC

- Date: September 2
- Game time: 3:30 p.m. ET
- Game weather: Temperature: 90 °F (32 °C) • Wind: 5–8 mph • Weather: Mostly cloudy
- Game attendance: 38,640
- Referee: Henry Wimberg
- TV: ESPN3
- ESPN Box Score

Game information

First Quarter

- (10:38) ECU FG: Jake Verity 22 yard field goal
  Pirates 3–0, 13 plays, 77 yards, 4:22
- (5:09) NCAT TD: Mac McCain 100 yard interception return (Noel Ruiz kick)
  Aggies 7–3, 8 plays, 68 yards, 3:15

Second Quarter

- (14:21) ECU TD: Blake Proehl 7 yard pass from Reid Herring (Jake Verity kick)
  Pirates 10–7, 11 plays, 61 yards, 3:52
- (6:50) ECU TD: Deondre Farrier 6 yard pass from Reid Herring (Jake Verity kick)
  Pirates 17–7, 13 plays, 58 yards, 5:07
- (0:06) NCAT TD: Zachary Leslie 12 yard pass from Lamar Raynard (Noel Ruiz kick)
  Pirates 17–14, 11 plays, 86 yards, 3:45

Third Quarter

- (6:39) ECU FG: Jake Verity 35 yard field goal
  Pirates 20–14, 5 plays, 19 yards, 1:52

Fourth Quarter

- (14:31) NCAT TD: Zachary Leslie 5 yard pass from Kylil Carter (Noel Ruiz kick)
  'Aggies 21–20, 8 plays, 62 yards, 3:16
- (10:02) ECU FG: Jake Verity 35 yard field goal
  Pirates 23–21, 5 plays, 19 yards, 1:52
- (7:05) NCAT TD: Elijah Bell 17 yard pass from Kylil Carter (Noel Ruiz kick)
  Aggies 28–23, 7 plays, 75 yards, 2:57

Top Passers

- NCAT – Lamar Raynard: 10–20, 94 yds, 1 TD
- ECU – Reid Herring: 37–65, 309 yds, 2 TD, 2 INT

Top Rushers

- NCAT – Marquell Cartwright: 18 car, 68 yds
- ECU – Anthony Scott: 12 car, 34 yds

Top Receiving

- NCAT – Malik Wilson: 7 rec, 89 yds
- ECU – Terrell Green: 10 rec, 85 yds

Leading Tacklers

- NCAT – Mac McCain: 10 solo, 1 assisted (11 total)
- ECU – Nate Harvey: 8 solo, 0 assisted (8 total)

=== Gardner–Webb ===
Gardner–Webb Runnin' Bulldogs at North Carolina A&T Aggies

| Quarter | 1 | 2 | 3 | 4 | Total |
|---|---|---|---|---|---|
| Runnin' Bulldogs | 3 | 3 | 0 | 0 | 6 |
| No. 5 Aggies | 7 | 10 | 14 | 14 | 45 |

at BB&T Stadium • Greensboro, NC

- Date: September 8
- Game time: 6:00 p.m. ET
- Game attendance: 13,111
- Referee: n/a
- TV: ESPN3/LTV
- ESPN Box Score

Game information

First Quarter

- (12:45) NCAT TD: Jeremiah Martin 28 yard run (Noel Ruiz kick)
  Aggies 7–0, 6 plays, 75 yards, 2:15
- (8:00) GWU FG: Tre' Jackson 25 yard field goal
  Aggies 7–3, 13 plays, 73 yards, 4:45

Second Quarter

- (4:37) NCAT TD: Kashar Baker 78 yard punt return (Noel Ruiz kick)
  Aggies 14–3, 0 plays, 0 yards, 0:00
- (2:15) GWU FG: Tre' Jackson 40 yard field goal
  Aggies 14–6, 8 plays, 46 yards, 2:22
- (4:37) NCAT FG: Noel Ruiz 43 yard field goal
  Aggies 17–6, 13 plays, 50 yards, 2:15

Third Quarter

- (11:52) NCAT TD: William Hollingsworth 5 yard pass from Lamar Raynard (Noel Ruiz kick)
  Aggies 24–6, 4 plays, 22 yards, 1:16
- (5:03) NCAT TD: Lamar Raynard 1 yard run (Noel Ruiz kick)
  Aggies 31–6, 10 plays, 89 yards, 5:35

Fourth Quarter

- (13:53) NCAT TD: Jah–Maine Martin 42 yard run (Noel Ruiz kick)
  Aggies 38–6, 1 plays, 42 yards, 0:08
- (8:23) NCAT TD: Kashon Baker 1 yard run (Noel Ruiz kick)
  Aggies 45–6, 6 plays, 41 yards, 3:12

Top Passers

- GWU – Jordan Smith: 14–29, 192 yds, 1 INT
- NCAT – Lamar Reynard: 14–24, 125 yds, 1 TD, 1 INT

Top Rushers

- GWU – Jayln Cagle: 11 car, 27 yds
- NCAT – Marquell Cartwright: 15 car, 119 yds

Top Receiving

- GWU – Kyle Horton: 6 rec, 96 yds
- NCAT – Ron Hunt: 7 rec, 90 yds

Leading Tacklers

- GWU – Corey Horne: 9 solo, 3 assisted (12 total)
- NCAT – Kiaundric Richardson: 3 solo, 1 assisted (4 total)

=== Morgan State ===
Morgan State Bears at North Carolina A&T Aggies

| Quarter | 1 | 2 | 3 | 4 | Total |
|---|---|---|---|---|---|
| Bears | 0 | 7 | 3 | 6 | 16 |
| No. 4 Aggies | 0 | 6 | 7 | 0 | 13 |

at BB&T Stadium • Greensboro, NC

- Date: September 22
- Game time: 6:00 p.m. ET
- Game weather: Temperature: 80 °F (27 °C) • Wind: NE • Weather: Cloudy
- Game attendance: 15,909
- Referee: Jason Soistman
- TV: LTV
- ESPN Box Score

Game information

First Quarter
No scoring
Second Quarter

- (9:45) NCAT TD: Leroy Hill 23 yard pass from Kylil Carter (two-point pass conv. failed)
  Aggies 6–0, 2 plays, 33 yards, 0:40
- (5:32) MORG TD: DeAndre Harris 10 yard run (Alex Raya kick)
  Bears 7–6, 9 plays, 65 yards, 4:13

Third Quarter

- (7:56) MORG FG: Alex Raya 40 yard field goal
  Bears 10–6, 7 plays, 32 yards, 5:29
- (2:24) NCAT TD: Marquell Cartwright 19 yard run (Noel Ruiz kick)
  Aggies 13–10, 5 plays, 31 yards, 1:14

Fourth Quarter

- (9:18) MORG FG: Alex Raya 51 yard field goal
  Tied 13–13, 11 plays, 40 yards, 4:32
- (0:00) MORG FG: Alex Raya 36 yard field goal
  Bears 16–13, 7 plays, 55 yards, 3:19

Top Passers

- MORG – DeAndre Harris: 10–24, 138 yds, 1 INT
- NCAT – Kylil Carter: 7–15, 55 yds, 1 TD

Top Rushers

- MORG – Joshua Chase: 16 car, 65 yds
- NCAT – Marquell Cartwright: 12 car, 54 yds, 1 TD

Top Receiving

- MORG – Daylen Baldwin: 3 rec, 38 yds
- NCAT – Leroy Hill: 1 rec, 23 yds, 1 TD

Leading Tacklers

- MORG – Damare Whitaker: 11 solo, 2 assisted (13 total)
- NCAT – Justin Cates: 6 solo, 0 assisted (6 total)

=== South Carolina State ===
South Carolina State Bulldogs at North Carolina A&T Aggies

| Quarter | 1 | 2 | 3 | 4 | Total |
|---|---|---|---|---|---|
| Bulldogs | 7 | 9 | 0 | 0 | 16 |
| No. 12 Aggies | 3 | 7 | 7 | 14 | 31 |

at BB&T Stadium • Greensboro, NC

- Date: September 29
- Game time: 7:00 p.m. ET
- Game weather: Temperature: 72 °F (22 °C) • Wind: S • Weather: Rain
- Game attendance: 11,530
- Referee: Rick Warne
- TV: ESPNU
- ESPN Box Score

Game information

First Quarter

- (5:56) SCSU TD: Farrika Grier 7 yard run (Dillon Bredson kick)
  Bulldogs 7–0, 6 plays, 22 yards, 2:36
- (0:16) NCAT FG: Noel Ruiz 31 yard field goal
  Bulldogs 7–3, 10 plays, 52 yards, 5:40

Second Quarter

- (10:23) SCSU TD: Jermaine Baxley 0 yard fumble return (Dillon Bredson kick failed)
  Bulldogs 13–3, 3 plays, −10 yards, 1:04
- (5:56) SCSU FG: Dillon Bredson 27 yard field goal
  Bulldogs 16–3, 7 plays, 60 yards, 2:30
- (0:35) NCAT TD: Jah-Maine Martin 40 yard run (Noel Ruiz kick)
  Bulldogs 16–10, 4 plays, 84 yards, 0:53

Third Quarter

- (11:17) NCAT TD: Zachary Leslie 9 yard pass from Lamar Raynard (Noel Ruiz kick)
  Aggies 17–16, 7 plays, 94 yards, 3:43

Fourth Quarter

- (14:55) NCAT TD: Ron Hunt 7 yard pass from Lamar Raynard (Noel Ruiz kick)
  Aggies 24–16, 7 plays, 58 yards, 3:10
- (9:51) NCAT TD: Malik Wilson 44 yard pass from Lamar Raynard (Noel Ruiz kick)
  Aggies 31–16, 8 plays, 78 yards, 3:26

Top Passers

- SCSU – Tyrece Nick: 5–16, 90 yds
- NCAT – Lamar Raynard: 19–27, 253 yds, 1 TD

Top Rushers

- SCSU – Tyrece Nick: 19 car, 47 yds
- NCAT – Marquell Cartwright: 18 car, 157 yds

Top Receiving

- SCSU – Quan Caldwell: 2 rec, 81 yds
- NCAT – Zachary Leslie: 5 rec, 106 yds, 1 TD

Leading Tacklers

- SCSU – Kendric Gathers: 6 solo, 2 assisted (8 total); 0.5 TFL
- NCAT – Kyin Howard: 6 solo, 1 assisted (7 total); 1.0 TFL

=== At Delaware State ===
North Carolina A&T Aggies at Delaware State Hornets

| Quarter | 1 | 2 | 3 | 4 | Total |
|---|---|---|---|---|---|
| No. 11 Aggies | 7 | 13 | 14 | 0 | 34 |
| Hornets | 3 | 3 | 0 | 0 | 6 |

at Alumni Stadium • Dover, DE

- Date: October 6
- Game time: 7:00 p.m. ET
- Game weather: Temperature: 76 °F (24 °C) • Wind: Slight • Weather: Partly cloudy
- Game attendance: 2,951
- Referee: Robert Frazier
- TV: ESPN3
- ESPN Box Score

Game information

First Quarter

- (2:31) DSU FG: Jose Romo-Martinez 38 yard field goal
  Hornets 3–0, 9 plays, 66 yards, 4:26
- (0:47) NCAT TD: Malik Wilson 13 yard pass from Lamar Raynard (Noel Ruiz kick)
  Aggies 7–3, 5 plays, 65 yards, 1:44

Second Quarter

- (11:49) NCAT TD: Lamar Raynard 10 yard run (Noel Ruiz kick blocked)
  Aggies 13–3, 7 plays, 37 yards, 2:19
- (9:34) NCAT TD: Malik Wilson 54 yard pass from Lamar Raynard (Noel Ruiz kick)
  Aggies 20–3, 2 plays, 66 yards, 0:41
- (3:07) DSU FG: Jose Romo-Martinez 49 yard field goal
  Aggies 20–6, 5 plays, 35 yards, 1:40

Third Quarter

- (9:58) NCAT TD: Lamar Raynard 5 yard run (Noel Ruiz kick)
  Aggies 27–6, 11 plays, 60 yards, 4:55
- (2:55) NCAT TD: Zachary Leslie 4 yard pass from Lamar Raynard (Noel Ruiz kick)
  Aggies 34–6, 4 plays, 30 yards, 1:43

Fourth Quarter
No scoring

Top Passers

- NCAT – Lamar Raynard: 14–23, 171 yds, 3 TD
- DSU – Keenan Black: 10–22, 108 yds

Top Rushers

- NCAT – Marquell Cartwright: 16 car, 97 yds
- DSU – Keenan Black: 12 car, 51 yds

Top Receiving

- NCAT – Malik Wilson: 4 rec, 107 yds, 2 TD
- DSU – Trey Gross: 3 rec, 55 yds

Leading Tacklers

- NCAT – Mac McCain: 5 solo, 0 assisted (5 total)
- DSU – Brian Cavicante: 7 solo, 5 assisted (12 total); 2.0 TFL

=== Florida A&M ===
Florida A&M Rattlers at North Carolina A&T Aggies

| Quarter | 1 | 2 | 3 | 4 | Total |
|---|---|---|---|---|---|
| Rattlers | 0 | 6 | 7 | 9 | 22 |
| No. 10 Aggies | 14 | 7 | 0 | 0 | 21 |

at BB&T Stadium • Greensboro, NC

- Date: October 13
- Game time: 1:00 p.m. ET
- Game weather: Temperature: 64 °F (18 °C) • Wind: NW • Weather: Sunny
- Game attendance: 15,418
- Referee: Roy Bernard
- TV: LTV
- ESPN Box Score

Game information

First Quarter

- (14:44) NCAT TD: Malik Wilson 100 yard kickoff return (Noel Ruiz kick)
  Aggies 7–0, 0 plays, 0 yards, 0:16
- (1:18) NCAT TD: Zachary Leslie 38 yard pass from Lamar Raynard (Noel Ruiz kick)
  Aggies 14–0, 3 plays, 68 yards, 0:28

Second Quarter

- (4:45) FAMU TD: Herman Jackson 55 yard fumble return (Yahia Aly kick failed)
  Aggies 14–6, 6 plays, 35 yards, 3:16
- (1:31) NCAT TD: Zachary Leslie 6 yard pass from Lamar Raynard (Noel Ruiz kick)
  Aggies 21–6, 1 play, 6 yards, 0:04

Third Quarter

- (8:55) FAMU TD: Azende Rey 5 yard run (Yahia Aly kick)
  Aggies 21–13, 14 plays, 82 yards, 6:05

Fourth Quarter

- (5:09) FAMU TD: Chad Hunter 11 yard pass from Ryan Stanley (two-point run conv. failed)
  Aggies 21–19, 13 plays, 56 yards, 6:13
- (0:04) FAMU FG: Yahia Aly 26 yard field goal
  Rattlers 22–21, 13 plays, 70 yards, 1:57

Top Passers

- FAMU – Ryan Stanley: 28–53, 313 yds, 1 TD, 1 INT
- NCAT – Lamar Raynard: 17–29, 248 yds, 2 TD, 1 INT

Top Rushers

- FAMU – Ricky Henrilus: 8 car, 33 yds
- NCAT – Marquell Cartwright: 14 car, 33 yds

Top Receiving

- FAMU – Chad Hunter: 8 rec, 105 yds, 1 TD
- NCAT – Zachary Leslie: 8 rec, 140 yds, 2 TD

Leading Tacklers

- FAMU – Derr Mayweather: 6 solo, 1 assisted (7 total)
- NCAT – Antoine Wilder: 5 solo, 3 assisted (8 total)

=== At Bethune–Cookman ===
North Carolina A&T Aggies at Bethune–Cookman Wildcats

| Quarter | 1 | 2 | 3 | 4 | Total |
|---|---|---|---|---|---|
| No. 19 Aggies | 13 | 13 | 2 | 7 | 35 |
| Wildcats | 3 | 0 | 7 | 0 | 10 |

at Daytona Stadium • Daytona Beach, FL

- Date: October 20
- Game time: 4:00 p.m. ET
- Game weather: Temperature: 86 °F (30 °C) • Wind: E 5 • Weather: Partly cloudy; 66% humidity
- Game attendance: 6,225
- Referee: Jason Soistman
- TV: LTV
- ESPN Box Score

Game information

First Quarter

- (10:27) NCAT TD: Marquell Cartwright 1 yard run (Noel Ruiz kick blocked)
  Aggies 6–0, 6 plays, 14 yards, 3:03
- (7:28) NCAT TD: Jah-Maine Martin 67 yard run (Noel Ruiz kick)
  Aggies 13–0, 2 plays, 76 yards, 0:41
- (1:33) BCU FG: Uriel Hernandez 40 yard field goal
  Aggies 13–3, 12 plays, 52 yards, 5:55

Second Quarter

- (14:19) NCAT TD: Quinzel Lockhart 19 yard pass from Lamar Raynard (Noel Ruiz kick failed)
  Aggies 19–3, 5 plays, 80 yards, 2:06
- (1:52) NCAT TD: Ron Hunt 55 yard pass from Lamar Raynard (Noel Ruiz kick)
  Aggies 26–3, 6 plays, 80 yards, 1:44

Third Quarter

- (8:27) BCU TD: Keavon Mitchell 0 yard fumble return (Uriel Hernandez kick)
  Aggies 26–10, 2 plays, 35 yards, 0:44
- (3:42) NCAT SF: Echols Turner Safety
  Aggies 28–10, 1 play, −22 yards, 0:09

Fourth Quarter

- (6:43) NCAT TD: Elijah Bell 15 yard pass from Kylil Carter (Noel Ruiz kick)
  Aggies 35–10, 8 plays, 85 yards, 3:06

Top Passers

- NCAT – Lamar Raynard: 11–14, 189 yds, 2 TD
- BCU – Akevious Williams: 14–21, 108 yds

Top Rushers

- NCAT – Jah-Maine Martin: 10 car, 118 yds, 1 TD
- BCU – Jimmie Robinson: 5 car, 50 yds

Top Receiving

- NCAT – Elijah Bell: 5 rec, 105 yds, 1 TD
- BCU – Steffon Francois: 5 rec, 47 yds

Leading Tacklers

- NCAT – Richie Kittle: 4 solo, 4 assisted (8 total); 0.5 TFL
- BCU – Tydarius Peters: 3 solo, 9 assisted (12 total)

=== Norfolk State ===
Norfolk State Spartans at North Carolina A&T Aggies

| Quarter | 1 | 2 | 3 | 4 | Total |
|---|---|---|---|---|---|
| Spartans | 10 | 7 | 3 | 0 | 20 |
| No. 17 Aggies | 7 | 14 | 6 | 10 | 37 |

at BB&T Stadium • Greensboro, NC

- Date: November 3
- Game time: 1:00 p.m. ET
- TV: LTV

Game information

First Quarter
Second Quarter
Third Quarter
Fourth Quarter

Top Passers

- NSU –
- NCAT –

Top Rushers

- NSU –
- NCAT –

Top Receiving

- NSU –
- NCAT –

Leading Tacklers

- NSU –
- NCAT –

=== At Savannah State ===
North Carolina A&T Aggies at Savannah State Tigers

| Quarter | 1 | 2 | 3 | 4 | Total |
|---|---|---|---|---|---|
| No. 14 Aggies | 7 | 14 | 0 | 7 | 28 |
| Tigers | 0 | 0 | 6 | 6 | 12 |

at Ted Wright Stadium • Savannah, GA

- Date: November 10
- Game time: 1:00 p.m. ET

Game information

First Quarter
Second Quarter
Third Quarter
Fourth Quarter

Top Passers

- NCAT –
- SSU –

Top Rushers

- NCAT –
- SSU –

Top Receiving

- NCAT –
- SSU –

Leading Tacklers

- NCAT –
- SSU –

=== At North Carolina Central ===
North Carolina A&T Aggies at North Carolina Central Eagles

| Quarter | 1 | 2 | 3 | 4 | Total |
|---|---|---|---|---|---|
| No. 12 Aggies | 14 | 10 | 14 | 7 | 45 |
| Eagles | 0 | 0 | 0 | 0 | 0 |

at O'Kelly–Riddick Stadium • Durham, NC

- Date: November 17
- Game time: 2:00 p.m. ET

Game information

First Quarter
Second Quarter
Third Quarter
Fourth Quarter

Top Passers

- NCAT –
- NCCU –

Top Rushers

- NCAT –
- NCCU –

Top Receiving

- NCAT –
- NCCU –

Leading Tacklers

- NCAT –
- NCCU –

=== Alcorn State – Celebration Bowl ===
2018 Celebration Bowl – Game Summary

| Quarter | 1 | 2 | 3 | 4 | Total |
|---|---|---|---|---|---|
| Braves | 3 | 3 | 10 | 6 | 22 |
| No. 11 Aggies | 7 | 10 | 7 | 0 | 24 |

at Mercedes-Benz Stadium, Atlanta, GA

- Date: Decemberber 15, 2018
- Game time: 12:00pm EDT
- Game weather: Played Indoors, Domed Stadium
- Referee: Justin Elliot
- TV: ABC

Game information

First quarter

- NCAT – Zachary Leslie 17-yard TD pass from Lamar Raynard, Noel Ruiz kick good, 12:38 (NCAT 7–0)
- ALCN – Corey McCullough 29-yard field goal, 2:52 (NCAT 7–3)

Second quarter

- NCAT – Ruiz 36-yard field goal, 8:33 (NCAT 10–3)
- NCAT – Elijah Bell 27-yard TD pass from Raynard, Ruiz kick good, 0:53 (NCAT 17–3)
- ALCN – McCullough 25-yard field goal, 0:00 (NCAT 17–6)

Third quarter

- ALCN – Noah Johnson 30-yard TD run, McCullough kick good, 4:29 (NCAT 17–13)
- ALCN – McCullough 29-yard field goal, 0:51 (NCAT 17–16)
- NCAT – Malik Wilson 79-yard kickoff return for TD, Ruiz kick good, 0:38 (NCAT 24–16)

Fourth quarter

- ALCN – Johnson 59-yard TD run, two-point pass conversion failed, 11:55 (NCAT 24–22)

Top Passer

- NCAT – Lamar Raynard – 18/30, 292 yards, 2 TD, INT
- ALCN – Noah Johnson – 11/27, 128 yards, INT

Top Rusher

- NCAT – Jah-Maine Martin – 10 carries, 31 yards
- ALCN – De'Shawn Johnson – 19 carries, 167 yards

Top Receiver

- NCAT – Zachary Leslie – 6 receptions, 119 yards, TD
- ALCN – Juan Anthony Jr. – 5 receptions, 75 yards

== Postseason ==
=== 2019 NFL draft ===
The 2019 NFL draft will be held on April 25–27 in Nashville, Tennessee. The following A&T players were either selected or signed as undrafted free agents following the draft.

| Player | Position | Round | Overall pick | NFL team |
|---|---|---|---|---|
| Darryl Johnson Jr. | DE | 7 | 225 | Buffalo Bills |

=== 2019 CFL draft ===
The 2019 CFL draft took place on May 2, 2019. The following A&T players were either selected or signed as undrafted free agents following the draft.

| Player | Position | Round | Overall pick | CFL team |
|---|---|---|---|---|
| Malik Wilson | WR/KR | —- | Undrafted free agent | Saskatchewan Roughriders |

== Ranking movements ==
Ranking movements Legend: ██ Increase in ranking ██ Decrease in ranking т = Tied with team above or below ( ) = First-place votes
| | Week | | | | | | | | | | | | | |
| Poll | Pre | 1 | 2 | 3 | 4 | 5 | 6 | 7 | 8 | 9 | 10 | 11 | 12 | Final |
|---|---|---|---|---|---|---|---|---|---|---|---|---|---|---|
| STATS FCS | 14 | 5 | 4 (3) | 4 (3) | 12 | 11 | 10 | 19 | 18 | 17 | 14 | 12 | 11 | 12 |
| Coaches | 14 | 6 | 6 | 4 | 13 | 11 | 10 | 18–T | 18 | 17 | 13 | 13 | 11 | 11 |
