= 2018 Delaware State Hornets football team =

American college football season

2018 Delaware State Hornets football
- Conference: Mid-Eastern Athletic Conference
- Record: 3–8 (2–5 MEAC)
- Head coach: Rod Milstead (1st season)
- Offensive coordinator: Eric Day (1st season)
- Defensive coordinator: Mark James (1st season)
- Home stadium: Alumni Stadium

2018 Mid-Eastern Athletic Conference football standings
	Conf.			Overall
Team	W		L	W		L
No. 12 North Carolina A&T $	6	–	1	9	–	2
Bethune–Cookman	5	–	2	7	–	5
Florida A&M	5	–	2	6	–	5
South Carolina State	4	–	3	5	–	6
Howard	4	–	3	4	–	6
North Carolina Central	3	–	4	5	–	6
Morgan State	3	–	4	4	–	7
Norfolk State	2	–	5	4	–	7
Delaware State	2	–	5	3	–	8
Savannah State	1	–	6	2	–	8
$ – Conference champion; Rankings from STATS Poll

The 2018 Delaware State Hornets football team represented Delaware State University in the 2018 NCAA Division I FCS football season. They were led by first-year head coach Rod Milstead and played their home games at Alumni Stadium. The team was a member of the Mid-Eastern Athletic Conference (MEAC). They concluded the season with a record of 3–8 overall and 2–5 in MEAC play, finishing in a tie for eighth place.

== Preseason ==
=== MEAC preseason poll ===
In a vote of the MEAC head coaches and sports information directors, the Hornets were picked to finish in last place.

=== Preseason All-MEAC Teams ===
The Hornets had four players selected to the preseason all-MEAC teams.

Offense

2nd team

Brycen Alleyne – RB

Defense

1st team

Brian Cavicante – LB

Keyjuan Selby – DB

Special teams

1st team

Fidel Romo-Martinez – P

== Schedule ==
Date	Time	Opponent	Site	TV	Result	Attendance
September 1	6:00 p.m.	at Buffalo*	University at Buffalo Stadium; Amherst, NY	ESPN3	L 10–48	17,959
September 8	12:00 p.m.	at Saint Francis (PA)*	DeGol Field; Loretto, PA	NECFR	L 14–45	1,074
September 15	7:00 p.m.	at Western Michigan*	Waldo Stadium; Kalamazoo, MI	ESPN+	L 0–68	23,244
September 29	4:00 p.m.	at Norfolk State	William "Dick" Price Stadium; Norfolk, VA	ESPN3	L 28–54	7,103
October 6	7:00 p.m.	No. 11 North Carolina A&T	Alumni Stadium; Dover, DE	ESPN3	L 6–34	2,951
October 13	1:00 p.m.	at Howard	William H. Greene Stadium; Washington, DC	ESPN3, SPORTSfever	L 13–55	4,473
October 20	1:30 p.m.	at South Carolina State	Oliver C. Dawson Stadium; Orangeburg, SC		L 19-30	14,477
October 27	2:00 p.m.	North Carolina Central^{†}	Alumni Stadium; Dover, DE		W 28-13	1,466
November 3	2:00 p.m.	Savannah State	Alumni Stadium; Dover, DE		W 25-6	1,563
November 10	1:00 p.m.	at Morgan State	Hughes Stadium; Baltimore, MD		L 0-9	1,008
November 17	2:00 p.m.	Virginia–Lynchburg*	Alumni Stadium; Dover, DE	ESPN3	W 41–7	856
*Non-conference game; ^{†}Homecoming; Rankings from STATS Poll released prior to the game; All times are in Eastern time

== Game summaries ==
=== At Buffalo ===
	1	2	3	4	Total
Hornets	0	3	0	7	10
Bulls	20	14	14	0	48

=== At Saint Francis (PA) ===
	1	2	3	4	Total
Hornets	7	7	0	0	14
Red Flash	28	0	17	0	45

=== At Western Michigan ===
	1	2	3	4	Total
Hornets	0	0	0	0	0
Broncos	14	14	16	24	68

=== At Norfolk State ===
	1	2	3	4	Total
Hornets	0	0	14	14	28
Spartans	6	21	20	7	54

=== North Carolina A&T ===
	1	2	3	4	Total
No. 11 Aggies	7	13	14	0	34
Hornets	3	3	0	0	6

=== At Howard ===
	1	2	3	4	Total
Hornets	0	6	0	7	13
Bison	23	18	7	7	55

=== At South Carolina State ===
	1	2	3	4	Total
Hornets	0	0	7	12	19
Bulldogs	0	7	13	10	30

=== Savannah State ===
	1	2	3	4	Total
Tigers	0	0	0	6	6
Hornets	3	10	2	12	27

=== At Morgan State ===
	1	2	3	4	Total
Hornets	0	0	0	0	0
Bears	0	6	3	0	9

=== Virginia–Lynchburg ===
	1	2	3	4	Total
Dragons	0	0	0	7	7
Hornets	20	21	0	0	41

== Coaching staff ==
2018 Delaware State Hornets coaching staff
Head coach: Head coach – Rod Milstead; Offensive coaches: Offensive coordinator/quarterbacks – Eric Day; Running backs – Keiki Misipeka; Wide receivers – Ollie Taylor; Offensive line – Anthony Vitale; Defensive coaches: Defensive coordinator/assistant head coach – Mark James; Linebackers – Cordie Greenlea; Outside linebackers – Ty Greenwood; Safeties – Anthony Missick; Source: Last updated 7/13/18
