= 2018 Savannah State Tigers football team =

American college football season

2018 Savannah State Tigers football
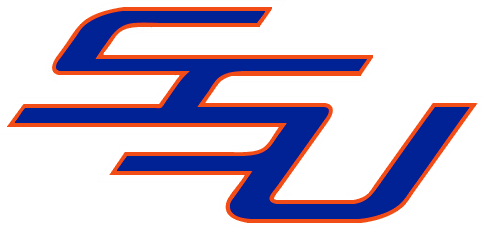
- Conference: Mid-Eastern Athletic Conference
- Record: 2–8 (1–6 MEAC)
- Head coach: Erik Raeburn (3rd season)
- Offensive coordinator: Bill Rychel (3rd season)
- Defensive coordinator: Chad Williams (3rd season)
- Home stadium: Ted Wright Stadium

2018 Mid-Eastern Athletic Conference football standings
	Conf.			Overall
Team	W		L	W		L
No. 12 North Carolina A&T $	6	–	1	9	–	2
Bethune–Cookman	5	–	2	7	–	5
Florida A&M	5	–	2	6	–	5
South Carolina State	4	–	3	5	–	6
Howard	4	–	3	4	–	6
North Carolina Central	3	–	4	5	–	6
Morgan State	3	–	4	4	–	7
Norfolk State	2	–	5	4	–	7
Delaware State	2	–	5	3	–	8
Savannah State	1	–	6	2	–	8
$ – Conference champion; Rankings from STATS Poll

The 2018 Savannah State Tigers football team represented Savannah State University in the 2018 NCAA Division I FCS football season. The Tigers were members of the Mid-Eastern Athletic Conference (MEAC). They were led by third-year head coach Erik Raeburn and played their home games at Ted Wright Stadium. They finished the season 2–8, 1–6 in MEAC play to finish in last place.

This season marked the Tigers' final season playing in Division I as they rejoined Division II after the season.

On December 9, head coach Erik Raeburn was fired. He finished as Savannah State with a three-year record of 8–23.

== Preseason ==
=== MEAC preseason poll ===
In a vote of the MEAC head coaches and sports information directors, the Tigers were picked to finish in eighth place.

=== Preseason All-MEAC Teams ===
The Tigers had five players selected to the preseason all-MEAC teams.

Offense

3rd team

Paris Baker – TE

Defense

1st team

Stefen Banks – DL

3rd team

Brandon Carswell – DL

Special teams

2nd team

Giovanni Lugo – K

3rd team

JaMichael Baldwin – RS

== Personnel ==
=== Coaching staff ===
Shawn Quinn - Defensive Coordinator/Linebacker Coach

== Schedule ==
Date	Time	Opponent	Site	TV	Result	Attendance
August 30	8:00 p.m.	at UAB*	Legion Field; Birmingham, AL	ESPN+	L 0–52	27,124
September 8	6:00 p.m.	at No. 22 (FBS) Miami (FL)*	Hard Rock Stadium; Miami Gardens, FL	ESPN3	L 0–77	60,307
~~September 15~~	~~1:00 p.m.~~	at ~~Howard~~*	~~William H. Greene Stadium~~; ~~Washington, D.C.~~		Cancelled (Note: This game was originally postponed in anticipation of Hurricane Florence, until being cancelled on November 16, 2018.)	
September 22	4:00 p.m.	at Florida A&M	Bragg Memorial Stadium; Tallahassee, FL	ESPN3	L 13–31	16,644
September 29	6:00 p.m.	Bethune–Cookman	Ted Wright Stadium; Savannah, GA	ESPN3	L 20–35	5,018
October 6	6:00 p.m.	Charleston Southern*	Ted Wright Stadium; Savannah, GA	ESPN3	W 23–3	2,970
October 13	6:00 p.m.	Morgan State	Ted Wright Stadium; Savannah, GA	ESPN3	L 11–18	2,655
October 27	3:00 p.m.	Norfolk State^{†}	Ted Wright Stadium; Savannah, GA	ESPN3	W 32–3	7,812
November 3	2:00 p.m.	at Delaware State	Alumni Stadium; Dover, DE	ESPN+	L 6–25	1,563
November 10	1:00 p.m.	No. 14 North Carolina A&T	Ted Wright Stadium; Savannah, GA	ESPN3	L 12–28	4,788
November 17	1:30 p.m.	at South Carolina State	Oliver C. Dawson Stadium; Orangeburg, SC	ESPN3	L 17–21	7,365
*Non-conference game; ^{†}Homecoming; Rankings from STATS Poll released prior to the game; All times are in Eastern time

Despite also being a member of the MEAC, the game vs Howard will be considered a non-conference game and will have no effect on the MEAC standings.

== Game summaries ==
=== At UAB ===
	1	2	3	4	Total
Tigers	0	0	0	0	0
Blazers	7	21	10	14	52

=== At Miami (FL) ===
	1	2	3	4	Total
Tigers	0	0	0	0	0
No. 22 (FBS) Hurricanes	7	21	21	28	77

=== At Florida A&M ===
	1	2	3	4	Total
Tigers	7	0	0	6	13
Rattlers	0	3	14	14	31

=== Bethune–Cookman ===
	1	2	3	4	Total
Wildcats	7	14	14	0	35
Tigers	7	7	0	6	20

=== Charleston Southern ===
	1	2	3	4	Total
Buccaneers	0	3	0	0	3
Tigers	7	7	0	9	23

=== Morgan State ===
	1	2	3	4	Total
Bears	3	8	7	0	18
Tigers	0	3	8	0	11

=== Norfolk State ===
	1	2	3	4	Total
Spartans	0	3	0	0	3
Tigers	7	10	7	8	32

=== At Delaware State ===
	1	2	3	4	Total
Tigers	0	0	0	6	6
Hornets	3	10	2	10	25

=== North Carolina A&T ===
	1	2	3	4	Total
No. 14 Aggies	7	14	0	7	28
Tigers	0	0	6	6	12

=== At South Carolina State ===
	1	2	3	4	Total
Tigers	3	14	0	0	17
Bulldogs	0	7	7	7	21
