= 2018 South Carolina State Bulldogs football team =

American college football season

2018 South Carolina State Bulldogs football
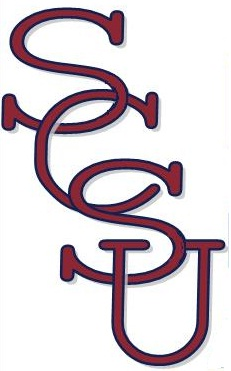
- Conference: Mid-Eastern Athletic Conference
- Record: 5–6 (4–3 MEAC)
- Head coach: Oliver Pough (17th season)
- Offensive coordinator: Daniel Lewis (2nd season)
- Home stadium: Oliver C. Dawson Stadium

2018 Mid-Eastern Athletic Conference football standings
| | Conf. | | | Overall |
| Team | W | | L | W | | L |
|---|---|---|---|---|---|---|
| No. 12 North Carolina A&T $ | 6 | – | 1 | 9 | – | 2 |
| Bethune–Cookman | 5 | – | 2 | 7 | – | 5 |
| Florida A&M | 5 | – | 2 | 6 | – | 5 |
| South Carolina State | 4 | – | 3 | 5 | – | 6 |
| Howard | 4 | – | 3 | 4 | – | 6 |
| North Carolina Central | 3 | – | 4 | 5 | – | 6 |
| Morgan State | 3 | – | 4 | 4 | – | 7 |
| Norfolk State | 2 | – | 5 | 4 | – | 7 |
| Delaware State | 2 | – | 5 | 3 | – | 8 |
| Savannah State | 1 | – | 6 | 2 | – | 8 |
$ – Conference champion; Rankings from STATS Poll

The 2018 South Carolina State Bulldogs football team represented South Carolina State University in the 2018 NCAA Division I FCS football season. They were led by 17th-year head coach Oliver Pough and played their home games at Oliver C. Dawson Stadium. They were a member of the Mid-Eastern Athletic Conference (MEAC). They finished the season 5–6, 4–3 in MEAC play to finish in a tie for fourth place.

== Preseason ==
=== MEAC preseason poll ===
In a vote of the MEAC head coaches and sports information directors, the Bulldogs were picked to finish in seventh place.

=== Preseason All-MEAC Teams ===
The Tigers had four players selected to the preseason all-MEAC teams.

Defense

2nd team

Damu Ford – LB

3rd team

Kendrick Gathers – DB

Alex Brown – DB

Special teams

3rd team

Clifford Benjamin, Jr. – P

== Schedule ==
| Date | Time | Opponent | Site | TV | Result | Attendance |
|---|---|---|---|---|---|---|
| September 1 | 6:00 p.m. | at Georgia Southern* | Paulson Stadium; Statesboro, GA | ESPN+ | L 6–37 | 15,260 |
| September 8 | 6:00 p.m. | at No. 19 (FBS) UCF* | Bright House Networks Stadium; Orlando, FL | ESPN3 | L 0–38 | 43,269 |
| September 22 | 6:00 p.m. | Norfolk State* | Oliver C. Dawson Stadium; Orangeburg, SC | ESPN3 | L 7–17 | 7,820 |
| September 27 | 7:00 p.m. | at No. 12 North Carolina A&T | BB&T Stadium; Greensboro, NC (rivalry) | ESPNU | L 16–31 | 11,530 |
| October 6 | 1:00 p.m. | at Morgan State | Hughes Stadium; Baltimore, MD | ESPN3 | W 21–18 | 8,103 |
| October 13 | 2:00 p.m. | Bethune–Cookman | Oliver C. Dawson Stadium; Orangeburg, SC | | L 26–28 | 12,213 |
| October 20 | 1:30 p.m. | Delaware State^{†} | Oliver C. Dawson Stadium; Orangeburg, SC | | W 30–19 | 14,477 |
| October 27 | 1:00 p.m. | at Howard | William H. Greene Stadium; Washington, D.C. | | W 27–21 | 7,501 |
| November 10 | 4:00 p.m. | at Florida A&M* | Bragg Memorial Stadium; Tallahassee, FL | | W 44–21 | 12,608 |
| November 17 | 1:30 p.m. | Savannah State | Oliver C. Dawson Stadium; Orangeburg, SC | | W 21–17 | 7,365 |
| November 24 (Note: This game was originally scheduled for September 15, but was moved in anticipation of Hurricane Florence.) | 12:30 p.m. | North Carolina Central | Oliver C. Dawson Stadium; Orangeburg, SC | | L 17–21 | 3,996 |
*Non-conference game; ^{†}Homecoming; Rankings from STATS Poll released prior to the game; All times are in Eastern time

- Source: Schedule

Despite also being members of the MEAC, games against Florida A&M and Norfolk State will be considered non-conference games and will not have an effect on the MEAC standings.

== Game summaries ==
=== At Georgia Southern ===
| | 1 | 2 | 3 | 4 | Total |
|---|---|---|---|---|---|
| Bulldogs | 0 | 0 | 6 | 0 | 6 |
| Eagles | 13 | 3 | 7 | 14 | 37 |

=== At UCF ===
| | 1 | 2 | 3 | 4 | Total |
|---|---|---|---|---|---|
| Bulldogs | 0 | 0 | 0 | 0 | 0 |
| Knights | 14 | 10 | 14 | 0 | 38 |

=== Norfolk State ===
| | 1 | 2 | 3 | 4 | Total |
|---|---|---|---|---|---|
| Spartans | 7 | 7 | 0 | 3 | 17 |
| Bulldogs | 0 | 0 | 7 | 0 | 7 |

=== At North Carolina A&T ===
| | 1 | 2 | 3 | 4 | Total |
|---|---|---|---|---|---|
| Bulldogs | 7 | 9 | 0 | 0 | 16 |
| No. 12 Aggies | 3 | 7 | 7 | 14 | 31 |

=== At Morgan State ===
| | 1 | 2 | 3 | 4 | Total |
|---|---|---|---|---|---|
| Bulldogs | 7 | 7 | 0 | 7 | 21 |
| Bears | 11 | 0 | 0 | 7 | 18 |

=== Bethune–Cookman ===
| | 1 | 2 | 3 | 4 | Total |
|---|---|---|---|---|---|
| Wildcats | 10 | 15 | 0 | 3 | 28 |
| Bulldogs | 0 | 13 | 7 | 6 | 26 |

=== Delaware State ===
| | 1 | 2 | 3 | 4 | Total |
|---|---|---|---|---|---|
| Hornets | 0 | 0 | 7 | 12 | 19 |
| Bulldogs | 0 | 7 | 13 | 10 | 30 |

=== At Howard ===
| | 1 | 2 | 3 | 4 | Total |
|---|---|---|---|---|---|
| Bulldogs | 7 | 13 | 0 | 7 | 27 |
| Bison | 0 | 7 | 0 | 14 | 21 |

=== At Florida A&M ===
| | 1 | 2 | 3 | 4 | Total |
|---|---|---|---|---|---|
| Bulldogs | 10 | 14 | 6 | 14 | 44 |
| Rattlers | 0 | 14 | 7 | 0 | 21 |

=== Savannah State ===
| | 1 | 2 | 3 | 4 | Total |
|---|---|---|---|---|---|
| Tigers | 3 | 14 | 0 | 0 | 17 |
| Bulldogs | 0 | 7 | 7 | 7 | 21 |

=== North Carolina Central ===
| | 1 | 2 | 3 | 4 | Total |
|---|---|---|---|---|---|
| Eagles | 0 | 0 | 7 | 14 | 21 |
| Bulldogs | 0 | 10 | 0 | 7 | 17 |
