= Latrell Scott =

American football player and coach (born 1975)

Current position
- Title: Running backs coach
- Team: Maryland
- Conference: Big Ten

Biographical details
- Born: July 17, 1975 (age 51); Richmond, Virginia, U.S.

Playing career
- 1994–1998: Hampton
- Position: Tight end

Coaching career (HC unless noted)
- 1999–2000: Fork Union Military Academy (VA) (assistant)
- 2001: Western Carolina (WR)
- 2002–2004: VMI (WR)
- 2005–2006: Richmond (WR)
- 2007: Richmond (AHC/WR)
- 2008: Tennessee (WR)
- 2009: Virginia (WR)
- 2010: Richmond
- 2012: James Madison (TE)
- 2013–2014: Virginia State
- 2015–2020: Norfolk State
- 2021–2022: East Carolina (TE)
- 2023–present: Maryland (RB)

Head coaching record
- Overall: 46–43

Accomplishments and honors

Championships
- 2 CIAA North Division (2013–2014)

Latrell Scott (born July 17, 1975) is an American football coach who is currently the running backs coach at Maryland. He was previously the head football coach of Norfolk State University, a position he held from 2015 through 2020 season that was canceled due to COVID-19 concerns. Scott served as the head football coach at the University of Richmond in 2010 and at Virginia State University from 2013 to 2014.

Scott grew up in the Richmond, Virginia area and attended Mechanicsville High School.

Early on, Scott served as the wide receivers coach at several schools, including the University of Virginia, the University of Tennessee, Richmond, Virginia Military Institute (VMI), and Western Carolina University. He also served as an assistant coach at Fork Union Military Academy. Scott was named head coach of the University of Richmond on December 15, 2009, replacing Mike London.

At 34 years old, Scott was the youngest head coach in NCAA Division I football at the time of his hiring. Scott resigned from his coaching duties at the University of Richmond on August 23, 2011 after being charged with driving while intoxicated. Scott's resignation came just a week before the team's first game of the season.

On April 6, 2012 Scott was hired by Mickey Matthews as tight ends coach at James Madison University of the Colonial Athletic Association. On January 14, 2013, Scott was introduced as the 23rd all-time head coach at Virginia State University.

== Head coaching record ==
Year	Team	Overall	Conference	Standing	Bowl/playoffs	TSN^{#}	Coaches^{°}
Richmond Spiders (Colonial Athletic Association) (2010)
2010	Richmond	6–5	4–4	T–4th			
Richmond:		6–5	4–4				
Virginia State Trojans (Central Intercollegiate Athletic Association) (2013–2015)
2013	Virginia State	9–1	7–0	1st (North)			
2014	Virginia State	10–2	8–0	1st (North)	L NCAA Division II Second Round		
Virginia State:		19–3	15–0				
Norfolk State Spartans (Mid-Eastern Athletic Conference) (2015–2020)
2015	Norfolk State	4–7	4–4	T–6th			
2016	Norfolk State	4–7	3–5	T–7th			
2017	Norfolk State	4–7	4–4	6th			
2018	Norfolk State	4–7	2–5	T–8th			
2019	Norfolk State	5–7	4–4	5th			
2020–21	No team—COVID-19						
Norfolk State:		21–35	17–22				
Total:		46–43					
National championship Conference title Conference division title or championship game berth
^{#}Rankings from final Sports Network poll.; ^{°}Rankings from final Coaches Poll.
