= 2018 Morgan State Bears football team =

American college football season

2018 Morgan State Bears football
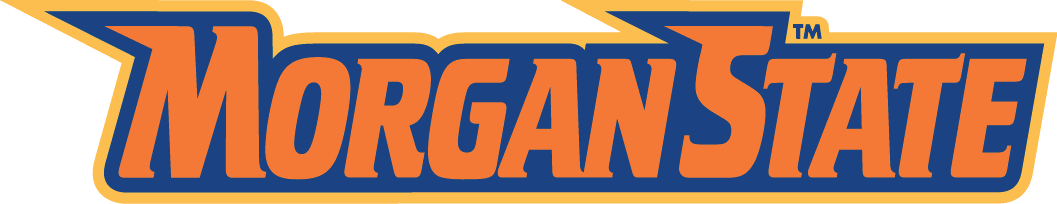
- Conference: Mid-Eastern Athletic Conference
- Record: 4–7 (3–4 MEAC)
- Head coach: Ernest T. Jones (1st season)
- Offensive coordinator: Travis Manger (1st season)
- Co-defensive coordinators: Antonio James (1st season); Aaron Kelton (1st season)
- Home stadium: Hughes Stadium

2018 Mid-Eastern Athletic Conference football standings
	Conf.			Overall
Team	W		L	W		L
No. 12 North Carolina A&T $	6	–	1	9	–	2
Bethune–Cookman	5	–	2	7	–	5
Florida A&M	5	–	2	6	–	5
South Carolina State	4	–	3	5	–	6
Howard	4	–	3	4	–	6
North Carolina Central	3	–	4	5	–	6
Morgan State	3	–	4	4	–	7
Norfolk State	2	–	5	4	–	7
Delaware State	2	–	5	3	–	8
Savannah State	1	–	6	2	–	8
$ – Conference champion; Rankings from STATS Poll

The 2018 Morgan State Bears football team represented Morgan State University in the 2018 NCAA Division I FCS football season. They were led by first-year interim head coach Ernest T. Jones. The Bears played their home games at Hughes Stadium. They were a member of the Mid-Eastern Athletic Conference (MEAC). They finished the season 4–7, 3–4 in MEAC play to finish in a tie for sixth place.

== Preseason ==
=== MEAC preseason poll ===
In a vote of the MEAC head coaches and sports information directors, the Bears were picked to finish in ninth place.

=== Preseason All-MEAC Teams ===
The Bears had seven players selected to the preseason all-MEAC teams.

Offense

3rd team

Manasseh Bailey – WR

Matthew Thompson – C

Joshua Miles – OL

Defense

1st team

Malachi Washington – DL

Rico Kennedy – LB

3rd team

Ian McBorrough – LB

Carl Garnes – DB

== Schedule ==
Date	Time	Opponent	Site	TV	Result	Attendance
September 1	7:00 p.m.	Towson*	Hughes Stadium; Baltimore, MD (The Battle for Greater Baltimore)	SPORTSfever TV; MeTV Baltimore	L 10–36	9,209
September 8	3:30 p.m.	at Akron*	InfoCision Stadium–Summa Field; Akron, OH	ESPN+	L 7–41	18,413
September 15	7:00 p.m.	at Albany*	Bob Ford Field at Tom & Mary Casey Stadium; Albany, NY		L 27–30	6,503
September 22	6:00 p.m.	at No. 4 North Carolina A&T*	BB&T Stadium; Greensboro, NC	ESPN3	W 16–13	15,909
October 6	1:00 p.m.	South Carolina State^{†}	Hughes Stadium; Baltimore, MD	SPORTSfever TV; MeTV Baltimore	L 18–21	8,103
October 13	6:00 p.m.	at Savannah State	Ted A. Wright Stadium; Savannah, GA	ESPN3	W 18–11	2,655
October 20	7:00 p.m.	Howard	Hughes Stadium; Baltimore, MD (Rivalry)	SPORTSfever TV; MeTV Baltimore	L 26–35	1,021
October 27	4:00 p.m.	at Florida A&M	Bragg Memorial Stadium; Tallahassee, FL	ESPN3	L 3–38	14,037
November 3	4:00 p.m.	Bethune–Cookman	Hughes Stadium; Baltimore, MD	SPORTSfever TV; MeTV Baltimore	L 28–30	2,008
November 10	1:00 p.m.	Delaware State	Hughes Stadium; Baltimore, MD	SPORTSfever TV; MeTV Baltimore	W 9–0	1,008
November 17	1:00 p.m.	at Norfolk State	William "Dick" Price Stadium; Norfolk, VA	ESPN3	W 44–27	3,437
*Non-conference game; ^{†}Homecoming; Rankings from STATS FCS Poll released prior to game; All times are in Eastern time

- Source: Schedule

Despite also being a member of the MEAC, the game vs North Carolina A&T will be considered a non conference game and will not effect the MEAC standings.

== Game summaries ==
=== Towson ===
	1	2	3	4	Total
Tigers	3	14	14	5	36
Bears	7	0	3	0	10

=== At Akron ===
	1	2	3	4	Total
Bears	0	0	0	7	7
Zips	17	10	14	0	41

=== At Albany ===
	1	2	3	4	Total
Bears	0	13	7	7	27
Great Danes	3	14	3	10	30

=== At North Carolina A&T ===
	1	2	3	4	Total
Bears	0	7	3	6	16
No. 4 Aggies	0	6	7	0	13

=== South Carolina State ===
	1	2	3	4	Total
Bulldogs	7	7	0	7	21
Bears	11	0	0	7	18

=== At Savannah State ===
	1	2	3	4	Total
Bears	3	8	7	0	18
Tigers	0	3	8	0	11

=== Howard ===
	1	2	3	4	Total
Bison	6	14	0	15	35
Bears	10	9	7	0	26

=== At Florida A&M ===
	1	2	3	4	Total
Bears	0	0	0	3	3
Rattlers	14	17	7	0	38

=== Bethune–Cookman ===
	1	2	3	4	Total
Wildcats	9	7	7	7	30
Bears	0	8	7	13	28

=== Delaware State ===
	1	2	3	4	Total
Hornets	0	0	0	0	0
Bears	0	6	3	0	9

=== At Norfolk State ===
	1	2	3	4	Total
Bears	10	14	7	13	44
Spartans	6	0	0	21	27

== Coaching staff ==
2018 Morgan State Bears coaching staff
Head coach: Head coach (interim)/defensive coordinator/defensive backs – Ernest T. Jones; Offensive coaches: Offensive coordinator/quarterbacks – Travis Manger; Assistant head coach/co-special teams/wide receivers – Ron Dickerson Jr.; Offensive line/run game coordinator – Isaac Williams; Running backs – Jordan Hopgood; Tight ends – Josh Firm; Defensive coaches: Co-defensive coordinator/co-special teams/outside linebackers – Antonio James; Inside linebacks – Benjamin Thomas; Safeties – Benjamin Thomas; Defensive line – Logan Williams; Administrative staff: Director of football operations – Andrew Magee; Equipment manager – Leo Roberts IV; Source: Last updated 7/13/18.

== Players drafted into the NFL ==
Round	Pick	Player	Position	NFL club
7	248	Joshua Miles	OT	Arizona Cardinals
