= 2018 Bethune–Cookman Wildcats football team =

American college football season

2018 Bethune–Cookman Wildcats football
- Conference: Mid-Eastern Athletic Conference
- Record: 7–5 (5–2 MEAC)
- Head coach: Terry Sims (4th season)
- Offensive coordinator: Allen Suber (2nd season)
- Defensive coordinator: Charles Jones
- Home stadium: Daytona Stadium

2018 Mid-Eastern Athletic Conference football standings
	Conf.			Overall
Team	W		L	W		L
No. 12 North Carolina A&T $	6	–	1	9	–	2
Bethune–Cookman	5	–	2	7	–	5
Florida A&M	5	–	2	6	–	5
South Carolina State	4	–	3	5	–	6
Howard	4	–	3	4	–	6
North Carolina Central	3	–	4	5	–	6
Morgan State	3	–	4	4	–	7
Norfolk State	2	–	5	4	–	7
Delaware State	2	–	5	3	–	8
Savannah State	1	–	6	2	–	8
$ – Conference champion; Rankings from STATS Poll

The 2018 Bethune–Cookman Wildcats football team represented Bethune–Cookman University in the 2018 NCAA Division I FCS football season. They were led by fourth-year head coach Terry Sims and played their home games at the newly renamed Daytona Stadium. They were a member of the Mid-Eastern Athletic Conference (MEAC). They finished the season 7–5, 5–2 in MEAC play to finish in a tie for second place.

== Preseason ==
=== MEAC preseason poll ===
In a vote of the MEAC head coaches and sports information directors, the Wildcats were picked to finish in fourth place.

=== Preseason All-MEAC Teams ===
The Wildcats had five players selected to the preseason all-MEAC teams.

Offense

1st team

Dwayne Brown – OL

3rd team

Tupac Isme – RB

Defense

2nd team

Todney Evans – DL

3rd team

Kevin Thompson – DL

Special teams

1st team

Uriel Hernandez – K

== Schedule ==
Date	Time	Opponent	Site	TV	Result	Attendance
September 1	7:00 p.m.	at Tennessee State*	Nissan Stadium; Nashville, TN (John Merritt Classic)	ESPN+	L 3–34	14,069
September 8	4:00 p.m.	Virginia–Lynchburg*	Daytona Stadium; Daytona Beach, FL	ESPN3	W 79–16	4,662
September 15	6:00 p.m.	at Florida Atlantic*	FAU Stadium; Boca Raton, FL	Stadium	L 28–49	19,017
September 22	4:30 p.m.	vs. Howard	Lucas Oil Stadium; Indianapolis, IN (Circle City Classic)	ESPN3	L 35–41	19,172
September 29	6:00 p.m.	at Savannah State	Ted Wright Stadium; Savannah, GA	ESPN3	W 35–20	5,018
October 6	4:00 p.m.	Mississippi Valley State*	Daytona Stadium; Daytona Beach, FL	ESPN3	W 41–27	10,278
October 13	2:00 p.m.	at South Carolina State	Oliver C. Dawson Stadium; Orangeburg, SC		W 28–26	12,213
October 20	4:00 p.m.	No. 19 North Carolina A&T	Daytona Stadium; Daytona Beach, FL		L 10–35	6,225
October 27 (Note: Nebraska finalized an agreement to play Bethune–Cookman on October 27 at Memorial Stadium to fill an opening on their schedule and will replace the Cornhuskers’ September 1 game against Akron.)	12:00 p.m.	at Nebraska*	Memorial Stadium; Lincoln, NE	BTN	L 9–45	88,735
November 3	4:00 p.m.	at Morgan State	Hughes Stadium; Baltimore, MD		W 30–28	2,008
November 8	7:00 p.m.	North Carolina Central	Daytona Stadium; Daytona Beach, FL	ESPNU	W 28–25 ^{2OT}	3,145
November 17	2:00 p.m.	vs. Florida A&M	Camping World Stadium; Orlando, FL (Florida Classic)	ESPN Classic	W 33–19	52,142
*Non-conference game; Rankings from STATS Poll released prior to the game; All times are in Eastern time

Source: Schedule

== Game summaries ==
=== At Tennessee State ===
	1	2	3	4	Total
Wildcats	0	3	0	0	3
Tigers	14	7	3	10	34

=== Virginia–Lynchburg ===
	1	2	3	4	Total
Dragons	0	9	7	0	16
Wildcats	30	28	21	0	79

=== At Florida Atlantic ===
	1	2	3	4	Total
Wildcats	0	14	7	7	28
Owls	29	7	7	6	49

=== vs Howard ===
	1	2	3	4	Total
Bison	14	14	13	0	41
Wildcats	14	14	0	7	35

=== At Savannah State ===
	1	2	3	4	Total
Wildcats	7	14	14	0	35
Tigers	7	7	0	6	20

=== Mississippi Valley State ===
	1	2	3	4	Total
Delta Devils	7	7	6	7	27
Wildcats	0	28	6	7	41

=== At South Carolina State ===
	1	2	3	4	Total
Wildcats	10	15	0	3	28
Bulldogs	0	13	7	6	26

=== North Carolina A&T ===
	1	2	3	4	Total
No. 19 Aggies	13	13	2	7	35
Wildcats	3	0	7	0	10

=== At Nebraska ===
	1	2	3	4	Total
Wildcats	3	0	0	6	9
Cornhuskers	28	10	0	7	45

=== At Morgan State ===
	1	2	3	4	Total
Wildcats	9	7	7	7	30
Bears	0	8	7	13	28

=== North Carolina Central ===
	1	2	3	4	OT	2OT	Total
Eagles	6	10	0	6	3	0	25
Wildcats	2	6	7	7	3	3	28

=== vs Florida A&M ===
	1	2	3	4	Total
Wildcats	0	7	12	14	33
Rattlers	3	10	6	0	19
