= 2018 Florida A&M Rattlers football team =

American college football season

2018 Florida A&M Rattlers football
- Conference: Mid-Eastern Athletic Conference
- Record: 6–5 (5–2 MEAC)
- Head coach: Willie Simmons (1st season)
- Offensive coordinator: Alex Jackson (1st season)
- Offensive scheme: Spread
- Defensive coordinator: Ralph Street (1st season)
- Base defense: 4–3
- Home stadium: Bragg Memorial Stadium

2018 Mid-Eastern Athletic Conference football standings
	Conf.			Overall
Team	W		L	W		L
No. 12 North Carolina A&T $	6	–	1	9	–	2
Bethune–Cookman	5	–	2	7	–	5
Florida A&M	5	–	2	6	–	5
South Carolina State	4	–	3	5	–	6
Howard	4	–	3	4	–	6
North Carolina Central	3	–	4	5	–	6
Morgan State	3	–	4	4	–	7
Norfolk State	2	–	5	4	–	7
Delaware State	2	–	5	3	–	8
Savannah State	1	–	6	2	–	8
$ – Conference champion; Rankings from STATS Poll

The 2018 Florida A&M Rattlers football team represented Florida A&M University in the 2018 NCAA Division I FCS football season. The Rattlers were led by first-year head coach Willie Simmons. They played their home games at Bragg Memorial Stadium. They were a member of the Mid-Eastern Athletic Conference. They finished the season 6–5, 5–2 in MEAC play to finish in a tie for second place.

== Preseason ==
=== MEAC preseason poll ===
In a vote of the MEAC head coaches and sports information directors, the Rattlers were picked to finish in fifth place.

=== Preseason All-MEAC Teams ===
The Rattlers had ten players selected to the preseason all-MEAC teams.

Offense

2nd team

Devin Bowers – RB

Loubens Polinice – OL

3rd team

Ryan Stanley – QB

Obinna Nwankwo – OL

Khalil Harris – OL

Defense

2nd team

Antonio Miller – DL

Jabireel Hazly – LB

Orlando McKinley – DB

Terry Jefferson – DB

Special teams

2nd team

Chris Fabboul – P

== Schedule ==
Date	Time	Opponent	Site	TV	Result	Attendance
September 1	5:00 p.m.	Fort Valley State*	Bragg Memorial Stadium; Tallahassee, FL (Jake Gaither Classic)	ESPN3	W 41–7	20,262
September 8	7:00 p.m.	at Troy*	Veterans Memorial Stadium; Troy, AL	ESPN+	L 7–59	25,767
September 15	5:00 p.m.	Jackson State*	Bragg Memorial Stadium; Tallahassee, FL	ESPN3	L 16–18	17,643
September 22	4:00 p.m.	Savannah State	Bragg Memorial Stadium; Tallahassee, FL	ESPN3	W 31–13	16,644
September 29	4:00 p.m.	at North Carolina Central	O'Kelly–Riddick Stadium; Durham, NC	ESPN3	W 55–14	8,451
October 6	4:00 p.m.	Norfolk State^{†}	Bragg Memorial Stadium; Tallahassee, FL	ESPN3	W 17–0	26,045
October 13	1:00 p.m.	at No. 10 North Carolina A&T	BB&T Stadium; Greensboro, NC	ESPN3	W 22–21	15,418
October 27	4:00 p.m.	Morgan State	Bragg Memorial Stadium; Tallahassee, FL	ESPN3	W 38–3	14,037
November 3	1:00 p.m.	at Howard	William H. Greene Stadium; Washington, D.C.		L 23–31	6,858
November 10	4:00 p.m.	South Carolina State	Bragg Memorial Stadium; Tallahassee, FL	ESPN3	L 21–44	12,608
November 17	2:00 p.m.	vs. Bethune–Cookman	Camping World Stadium; Orlando, FL (Florida Classic)	ESPN Classic	L 19–33	52,142
*Non-conference game; ^{†}Homecoming; Rankings from STATS Poll released prior to the game; All times are in Eastern time

- Source: Schedule

== Game summaries ==
=== Fort Valley State ===
	1	2	3	4	Total
Wildcats	0	7	0	0	7
Rattlers	7	13	13	8	41

=== At Troy ===
	1	2	3	4	Total
Rattlers	0	7	0	0	7
Trojans	21	17	14	7	59

=== Jackson State ===
	1	2	3	4	Total
Tigers	0	6	9	3	18
Rattlers	7	0	9	0	16

=== Savannah State ===
	1	2	3	4	Total
Tigers	7	0	0	6	13
Rattlers	0	3	14	14	31

=== At North Carolina Central ===
	1	2	3	4	Total
Rattlers	24	17	7	7	55
Eagles	7	0	7	0	14

=== Norfolk State ===
	1	2	3	4	Total
Spartans	0	0	0	0	0
Rattlers	0	3	0	14	17

=== At North Carolina A&T ===
	1	2	3	4	Total
Rattlers	0	6	7	9	22
No. 10 Aggies	14	7	0	0	21

=== Morgan State ===
	1	2	3	4	Total
Bears	0	0	0	3	3
Rattlers	14	17	7	0	38

=== At Howard ===
	1	2	3	4	Total
Rattlers	10	7	0	6	23
Bison	21	0	7	3	31

=== South Carolina State ===
	1	2	3	4	Total
Bulldogs	10	14	6	14	44
Rattlers	0	14	7	0	21

=== vs Bethune–Cookman ===
	1	2	3	4	Total
Wildcats	0	7	12	14	33
Rattlers	3	10	6	0	19

== Coaching staff ==
2018 Florida A&M Rattlers coaching staff
Head coach: Head coach – Willie Simmons; Assistant head coach – Billy Rolle; Offensive coaches: Offensive coordinator/offensive line – Alex Jackson; Tight ends/special teams/associate head coach – James Spady; Wide receivers – Jelani Barassa; Running backs – Clifford Henry; Graduate assistant – Mateo Kambui; Defensive coaches: Defensive coordinator/defensive line – Ralph Street; Defensive backs – Kenneth Gilstrap; Defensive backs – Brandon Sharp; Source: Last updated 7/13/18
