= 2018 Bucknell Bison football team =

American college football season

2018 Bucknell Bison football
- Conference: Patriot League
- Record: 1–10 (1–5 Patriot)
- Head coach: Joe Susan (9th season)
- Offensive coordinator: Bobby Acosta
- Defensive coordinator: Matt Borich
- Home stadium: Christy Mathewson–Memorial Stadium

Uniform
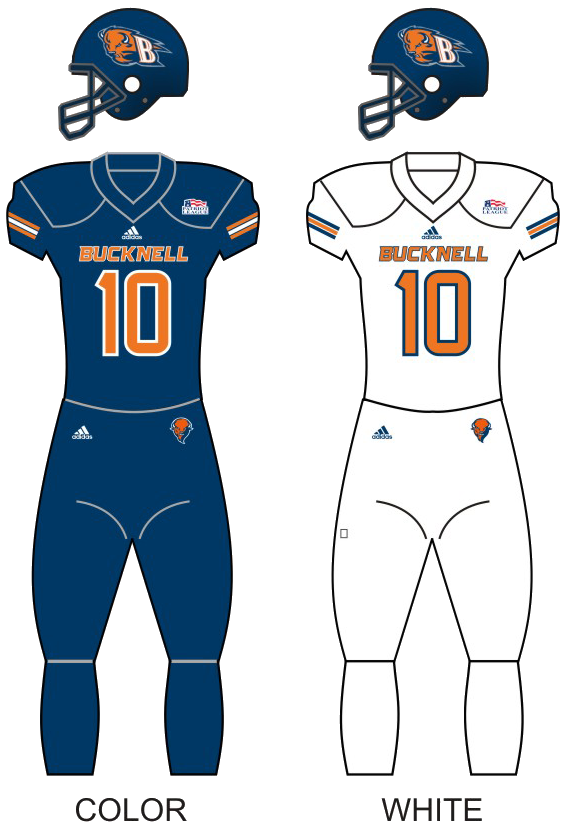

2018 Patriot League football standings
	Conf.			Overall
Team	W		L	W		L
No. 8 Colgate $^	6	–	0	10	–	2
Holy Cross	4	–	2	5	–	6
Georgetown	4	–	2	5	–	6
Lehigh	2	–	4	3	–	8
Lafayette	2	–	4	3	–	8
Fordham	2	–	4	2	–	9
Bucknell	1	–	5	1	–	10
$ – Conference champion; ^ – FCS playoff participant; Rankings from STATS Poll

The 2018 Bucknell Bison football team represented Bucknell University in the 2018 NCAA Division I FCS football season. They were led by ninth-year head coach Joe Susan and played their home games at Christy Mathewson–Memorial Stadium. They were a member of the Patriot League. They finished the season 1–10, 1–5 in Patriot League play to finish in last place.

== Preseason ==
=== Preseason coaches poll ===
The Patriot League released their preseason coaches poll on July 26, 2018, with the Bison predicted to finish in a tie for fifth place.

=== Preseason All-Patriot League team ===
The Bison placed two players on the preseason all-Patriot League team.

Offense

Pat Finn – OL

Special teams

Alex Pechin – P

== Schedule ==
Date	Time	Opponent	Site	TV	Result	Attendance
September 1	6:00 p.m.	William & Mary*	Christy Mathewson–Memorial Stadium; Lewisburg, PA	Stadium	L 7–14	5,042
September 8	3:00 p.m.	Sacred Heart*	Christy Mathewson–Memorial Stadium; Lewisburg, PA	Stadium	L 14–30	1,872
September 15	3:00 p.m.	at Penn*	Franklin Field; Philadelphia, PA	ESPN+	L 17–34	5,033
September 22	6:00 p.m.	at No. 15 Villanova*	Villanova Stadium; Villanova, PA		L 7–49	9,341
September 29	1:00 p.m.	at Holy Cross	Fitton Field; Worcester, MA	Stadium	W 19–16	8,275
October 6	12:00 p.m.	No. 21 Colgate	Christy Mathewson–Memorial Stadium; Lewisburg, PA	Stadium	L 3–27	2,007
October 13	1:00 p.m.	at Monmouth*	Kessler Stadium; West Long Branch, NJ	ESPN+	L 19–36	2,452
October 20	12:00 p.m.	Lafayette	Christy Mathewson–Memorial Stadium; Lewisburg, PA	Stadium	L 27–29	3,097
November 3	12:30 p.m.	at Lehigh	Goodman Stadium; Bethlehem, PA	Stadium	L 17–45	4,203
November 10	12:30 p.m.	at Georgetown	Cooper Field; Washington, DC	Stadium	L 3–14	1,825
November 17	12:00 p.m.	Fordham	Christy Mathewson–Memorial Stadium; Lewisburg, PA	Stadium	L 14–17	1,126
*Non-conference game; Rankings from STATS Poll released prior to the game; All times are in Eastern time

== Game summaries ==
=== William & Mary ===
	1	2	3	4	Total
Tribe	7	0	0	7	14
Bison	0	0	0	7	7

=== Sacred Heart ===
	1	2	3	4	Total
Pioneers	7	7	7	9	30
Bison	0	14	0	0	14

=== At Penn ===
	1	2	3	4	Total
Bison	3	7	7	0	17
Quakers	17	10	0	7	34

=== At Villanova ===
	1	2	3	4	Total
Bison	0	7	0	0	7
No. 15 Wildcats	28	14	0	7	49

=== At Holy Cross ===
	1	2	3	4	Total
Bison	0	6	6	7	19
Crusaders	7	0	0	9	16

=== Colgate ===
	1	2	3	4	Total
No. 21 Raiders	0	17	3	7	27
Bison	0	0	3	0	3

=== At Monmouth ===
	1	2	3	4	Total
Bison	0	6	7	6	19
Hawks	0	9	7	20	36

=== Lafayette ===
	1	2	3	4	Total
Leopards	7	0	13	9	29
Bison	7	7	7	6	27

=== At Lehigh ===
	1	2	3	4	Total
Bison	0	14	3	0	17
Mountain Hawks	7	14	10	14	45

=== At Georgetown ===
	1	2	3	4	Total
Bison	0	0	3	0	3
Hoyas	0	7	7	0	14

=== Fordham ===
	1	2	3	4	Total
Rams	7	7	3	0	17
Bison	0	7	7	0	14
