= 2018 Kennesaw State Owls football team =

American college football season

2018 Kennesaw State Owls football

Big South champion

FCS Playoffs Quarterfinals, L 17–27 vs. South Dakota State
- Conference: Big South Conference

Ranking
- STATS: No. 5
- FCS Coaches: No. 4
- Record: 11–2 (5–0 Big South)
- Head coach: Brian Bohannon (4th season)
- Offensive coordinator: Grant Chesnut (4th season)
- Offensive scheme: Flexbone option
- Defensive coordinator: Brian Newberry (4th season)
- Base defense: 4–2–5
- Home stadium: Fifth Third Bank Stadium

2018 Big South Conference football standings
	Conf.			Overall
Team	W		L	W		L
No. 5 Kennesaw State $^	5	–	0	11	–	2
Monmouth	4	–	1	8	–	3
Charleston Southern	3	–	2	5	–	6
Gardner–Webb	2	–	3	3	–	8
Campbell	1	–	4	6	–	5
Presbyterian	0	–	5	2	–	8
$ – Conference champion; ^ – FCS playoff participant; Rankings from STATS Poll

The 2018 Kennesaw State Owls football team represented Kennesaw State University in the 2018 NCAA Division I FCS football season. They were led by fourth-year head coach Brian Bohannon and played their home games at Fifth Third Bank Stadium in Kennesaw, Georgia as fourth-year members of the Big South Conference. They finished the season 11–2, 5–0 in Big South play to win the Big South conference championship for the second consecutive year. The Owls received the Big South's automatic bid to the FCS Playoffs. The Owls earned a No. 4 seed and a first round bye. They defeated Wofford in the second round before losing in the quarterfinals to No. 5 South Dakota State.

== Preseason ==
=== Big South poll ===
In the Big South preseason poll released on July 23, 2018, the Owls were predicted to finish as Big South champions.

=== Preseason All-Big South team ===
The Big South released their preseason all-Big South team on July 23, 2018, with the Owls having fourteen players selected along with two more at three positions on the honorable mention list. Quarterback Chandler Burks was named preseason offensive player of the year and linebacker Bryson Armstrong was named the preseason defensive player of the year.

Offense

Chandler Burks – QB

Darnell Holland – RB

Justin Sumpter – WR

C.J. Collins – OL

Joseph Alexander – OL

Ryan Warrior – OL

Defense

Desmond Johnson – DL

McKenzie Billingslea – DL

Bryson Armstrong – LB

Anthony Gore, Jr. – LB

Jace White – DB

Dorian Walker – DB

Special teams

Justin Thompson – K

Drew McCracken – LS

Honorable mention

Shaquil Terry – RB/KR

Nicholas Jones – P

=== Award watch lists ===
Award	Player	Position	Year
Walter Payton Award	Chandler Burks	QB	SR
Buck Buchanan Award	Bryson Armstrong	LB	SO

== Schedule ==
Date	Time	Opponent	Rank	Site	TV	Result	Attendance
August 30	7:00 p.m.	at Georgia State*	No. 5	Georgia State Stadium; Atlanta, GA	ESPN+	L 20–24	23,088
September 6	7:00 p.m.	at Tennessee Tech*	No. 7	Tucker Stadium; Cookeville, TN	ESPNU	W 49–10	4,118
September 15	6:45 p.m.	Alabama State*	No. 7	Fifth Third Bank Stadium; Kennesaw, GA	ESPN+	W 62–13	8,799
September 22	6:00 p.m.	Clark Atlanta*	No. 5	Fifth Third Bank Stadium; Kennesaw, GA	ESPN+	W 70–13	6,009
September 29	6:00 p.m.	Samford*	No. 4	Fifth Third Bank Stadium; Kennesaw, GA	ESPN3	W 24–10	6,304
October 6	2:00 p.m.	Presbyterian	No. 4	Fifth Third Bank Stadium; Kennesaw, GA	ESPN3	W 56–0	6,414
October 13	1:30 p.m.	at Gardner–Webb	No. 3	Ernest W. Spangler Stadium; Boiling Springs, NC	ESPN3	W 56–17	4,150
October 27	6:00 p.m.	at Charleston Southern	No. 2	Buccaneer Field; North Charleston, SC	ESPN+	W 38–10	1,242
November 3	2:00 p.m.	Campbell	No. 2	Fifth Third Bank Stadium; Kennesaw, GA	ESPN+	W 49–0	6,012
November 10	12:00 p.m.	at Monmouth	No. 2	Kessler Stadium; West Long Branch, NJ	ESPN3	W 51–14	2,332
November 17	3:00 p.m.	vs. No. 6 Jacksonville State*	No. 2	SunTrust Park; Atlanta, GA	FSS	W 60–52 ^{5OT}	16,949
December 1	2:00 p.m.	No. 13 Wofford*	No. 2	Fifth Third Bank Stadium; Kennesaw, GA (FCS Playoffs Second Round)	ESPN3	W 13–10	3,515
December 8	2:00 p.m.	No. 5 South Dakota State*	No. 2	Fifth Third Bank Stadium; Kennesaw, GA (FCS Playoffs Quarterfinals)	ESPN3	L 17–27	3,242
*Non-conference game; Rankings from STATS Poll released prior to the game; All times are in Eastern time

== Game summaries ==
=== At Georgia State ===
Kennesaw State at Georgia State

Team	1	2	3	4	Total
No. 5 Owls	7	7	6	0	20
• Panthers	0	14	0	10	24

- Date: August 30
- Location: Georgia State Stadium
  Atlanta, GA
- Game start: 7:00 p.m. EDT
- Elapsed time: 3:16
- Game attendance: 23,088
- Game weather: 83°F • S 6 • Mostly sunny
- Referee: Marshall Lewis
- TV announcers (ESPN+): Matt Stewart, Wayne Gandy, Jael Rucker

=== At Tennessee Tech ===
Kennesaw State at Tennessee Tech

Team	1	2	3	4	Total
• No. 7 Owls	7	14	21	7	49
Golden Eagles	3	0	0	7	10

- Date: September 6
- Location: Tucker Stadium
  Cookeville, TN
- Game start: 7:00 p.m. EDT
- Elapsed time: 3:02
- Game attendance: 4,118
- Game weather: 74°F • 10 mph • Early rain
- Referee: D. Whitehead
- TV announcers (ESPNU): Tiffany Greene, Jay Walker

=== Alabama State ===
Alabama State at Kennesaw State

Team	1	2	3	4	Total
Hornets	3	3	7	0	13
• No. 7 Owls	14	28	20	0	62

- Date: September 15
- Location: Fifth Third Bank Stadium
  Kennesaw, GA
- Game start: 6:45 p.m. EDT
- Elapsed time: 3:06
- Game attendance: 8,799
- Game weather: 78°F • 6 mph • Light rain
- Referee: Jeff Page
- TV announcers (ESPN+): Brian Katrek, Tutan Reyes, Chris Mooneyham

=== Clark Atlanta ===
Clark Atlanta at Kennesaw State

Team	1	2	3	4	Total
Panthers	13	0	0	0	13
• No. 5 Owls	14	21	21	14	70

- Date: September 22
- Location: Fifth Third Bank Stadium
  Kennesaw, GA
- Game start: 6:00 p.m. EDT
- Elapsed time: 3:03
- Game attendance: 6,009
- Game weather: 88°F • 6 mph • A few clouds
- Referee: Douglas Mercer
- TV announcers (ESPN+): Brian Katrek, Tutan Reyes, Chris Mooneyham, Lauren Hoffman

=== Samford ===
Samford at Kennesaw State

Team	1	2	3	4	Total
Bulldogs	3	0	0	7	10
• No. 4 Owls	7	7	7	3	24

- Date: September 29
- Location: Fifth Third Bank Stadium
  Kennesaw, GA
- Game start: 6:00 p.m. EDT
- Elapsed time: 2:41
- Game attendance: 6,304
- Game weather: 83°F • 6 mph • Partly Cloudy
- Referee: Stephen Hazle
- TV announcers (ESPN3): Brian Giffin, Brandon Joseph, Nathan McCreary

=== Presbyterian ===
Presbyterian at Kennesaw State

Team	1	2	3	4	Total
Blue Hose	0	0	0	0	0
• No. 4 Owls	14	14	21	7	56

- Date: October 6
- Location: Fifth Third Bank Stadium
  Kennesaw, GA
- Game start: 2:00 p.m. EDT
- Elapsed time: 2:51
- Game attendance: 6,414
- Referee: Marcus Woods
- TV announcers (ESPN3): Brian Katrek, Tutan Reyes, Chris Mooneyham, Lauren Hoffman

=== At Gardner–Webb ===
Kennesaw State at Gardner–Webb

Team	1	2	3	4	Total
• No. 3 Owls	7	21	14	14	56
Runnin' Bulldogs	3	0	0	14	17

- Date: October 13
- Location: Ernest W. Spangler Stadium
  Boiling Springs, NC
- Game start: 1:30 p.m. EDT
- Elapsed time: 2:45
- Game attendance: 4,150
- Game weather: 65°F • 7 mph • Sunny
- Referee: Duane Heydt
- TV announcers (ESPN3): Fabian Fuentes, Renaldo Wynn, Brendan Boylan

=== At Charleston Southern ===
Kennesaw State at Charleston Southern

Team	1	2	3	4	Total
• No. 2 Owls	7	17	7	7	38
Buccaneers	3	7	0	0	10

- Date: October 27
- Location: Buccaneer Field
  North Charleston, SC
- Game start: 6:00 p.m. EDT
- Elapsed time: 2:57
- Game attendance: 1,242
- Referee: Thomas Graham
- TV announcers (ESPN+): Kevin O’Rourke, Danny Croghan III, Danielle Hensley

=== Campbell ===
Campbell at Kennesaw State

Team	1	2	3	4	Total
Fighting Camels	0	0	0	0	0
• No. 2 Owls	0	21	21	7	49

- Date: November 3
- Location: Fifth Third Bank Stadium
  Kennesaw, GA
- Game start: 2:00 p.m. EDT
- Elapsed time: 2:40
- Game attendance: 6,012
- Game weather: 62°F • NW 1 • Sunny
- Referee: Todd LaPenta
- TV announcers (ESPN+): Brian Katrek, Tutan Reyes, Chris Mooneyham, Lauren Hoffman

=== At Monmouth ===
Kennesaw State at Monmouth

Team	1	2	3	4	Total
• No. 2 Owls	7	10	14	20	51
Hawks	7	7	0	0	14

- Date: November 10
- Location: Kessler Stadium
  West Long Branch, NJ
- Game start: 12:00 p.m. EDT
- Elapsed time: 2:56
- Game attendance: 2,332
- Game weather: 44°F • Sunny
- Referee: David Epperley
- TV announcers (ESPN3): Matt Harmon, Eddy Occhipinti, Suzi Mellano

=== Vs. Jacksonville State ===
Jacksonville State vs Kennesaw State

Team	1	2	3	4	OT	Total
No. 6 Gamecocks	7	7	10	0	28	52
• No. 2 Owls	0	10	7	7	36	60

- Date: November 17
- Location: SunTrust Park
  Atlanta, GA
- Game start: 3:00 p.m. EDT
- Elapsed time: 4:12
- Game attendance: 16,949
- Game weather: 64°F • WNW 3 • Partly Cloudy
- Referee: Larry Adcock
- TV announcers (FSS): Brian Katrek, Tutan Reyes, Chris Mooneyham

== FCS Playoffs ==
=== Wofford–Second Round ===
Wofford vs Kennesaw State

Team	1	2	3	4	Total
No. 13 Terriers	0	10	0	0	10
• No. 2 Owls	0	10	0	3	13

- Date: December 1
- Location: Fifth Third Bank Stadium
  Kennesaw, GA
- Game start: 2:00 p.m. EDT
- Elapsed time: 2:55
- Game attendance: 3,515
- Game weather: 54°F • E 9 • Light Rain/Fog/Mist
- Referee: Bruce Bondi
- TV announcers (ESPN3): Jim Barbar, John Gregory

=== South Dakota State–Quarterfinals ===
South Dakota State vs Kennesaw State

Team	1	2	3	4	Total
• No. 5 Jackrabbits	3	14	3	7	27
No. 2 Owls	3	0	0	14	17

- Date: December 8
- Location: Fifth Third Bank Stadium
  Kennesaw, GA
- Game start: 2:00 p.m. EDT
- Elapsed time: 2:47
- Game attendance: 3,242
- Game weather: 40°F • E 7 • Light/Heavy Rain
- Referee: Todd Boyd
- TV announcers (ESPN3): Robert Lee, Matt Chatham

== Ranking movements ==
Ranking movements Legend: ██ Increase in ranking ██ Decrease in ranking
	Week													
Poll	Pre	1	2	3	4	5	6	7	8	9	10	11	12	Final
STATS FCS	5	7	7	5	4	4	3	3	2	2	2	2	2	5
Coaches	5	8	8	5	4	3	2	2	2	2	2	2	2	4
