= 2018 Colgate Raiders football team =

American college football season

2018 Colgate Raiders football

Patriot League champion Lambert Cup winner

NCAA Division I Quarterfinals, L 0–35 vs. North Dakota State
- Conference: Patriot League

Ranking
- STATS: No. 8
- FCS Coaches: No. 7
- Record: 10–2 (6–0 Patriot)
- Head coach: Dan Hunt (5th season)
- Offensive coordinator: Chris Young (5th season)
- Defensive coordinator: Paul Shaffner (6th season)
- Home stadium: Crown Field at Andy Kerr Stadium

2018 Patriot League football standings
	Conf.			Overall
Team	W		L	W		L
No. 8 Colgate $^	6	–	0	10	–	2
Holy Cross	4	–	2	5	–	6
Georgetown	4	–	2	5	–	6
Lehigh	2	–	4	3	–	8
Lafayette	2	–	4	3	–	8
Fordham	2	–	4	2	–	9
Bucknell	1	–	5	1	–	10
$ – Conference champion; ^ – FCS playoff participant; Rankings from STATS Poll

The 2018 Colgate Raiders football team represented Colgate University in the 2018 NCAA Division I FCS football season. They were led by fifth-year head coach Dan Hunt and played their home games at Crown Field at Andy Kerr Stadium. They were a member of the Patriot League. They finished the season 10–2, 6–0 in Patriot League play to be Patriot League champions. They received the Patriot League's automatic bid to the FCS Playoffs where, after a first round bye, they defeated James Madison in the second round before losing in the quarterfinals to North Dakota State. Following the season, they were awarded the Lambert Division I FCS Cup by the Eastern College Athletic Conference and the Metropolitan New York Football Writers, signifying the Raiders as the best team in the East in Division I FCS.

== Preseason ==
=== Award watch lists ===
Award	Player	Position	Year
Buck Buchanan Award	Nick Wheeler	DE	JR

=== Preseason coaches poll ===
The Patriot League released their preseason coaches poll on July 26, 2018, with the Raiders predicted to finish as Patriot League champions.

=== Preseason All-Patriot League team ===
The Raiders placed ten players on the preseason all-Patriot League team.

Offense

James Holland, Jr. – RB

Thomas Ives – WR

Max Hartzman – OL

Jovaun Woolford – OL

Defense

Nick Wheeler – DL

T.J. Holl – LB

Tyler Castillo – DB

Abu Daramy-Swaray – DB

Alec Wisniewski – DB

Special teams

Chris Puzzi – K

== Schedule ==
Date	Time	Opponent	Rank	Site	TV	Result	Attendance
September 1	1:00 p.m.	Holy Cross		Crown Field at Andy Kerr Stadium; Hamilton, NY	Stadium	W 24–17	5,304
September 8	3:30 p.m.	at No. 20 New Hampshire*		Wildcat Stadium; Durham, NH	NBCS BOS	W 10–3	11,433
~~September 15~~	~~1:00 p.m.~~	at Furman*		Paladin Stadium; Greenville, SC	ESPN3	Cancelled (Note: This game was cancelled in anticipation of Hurricane Florence.)	
September 22	1:00 p.m.	Lafayette^{†}		Crown Field at Andy Kerr Stadium; Hamilton, NY	Stadium	W 45–0	7,753
September 29	6:00 p.m.	at William & Mary*	No. 24	Zable Stadium; Williamsburg, VA	Cox Yurview	W 23–0	9,191
October 6	12:00 p.m.	at Bucknell	No. 21	Christy Mathewson–Memorial Stadium; Lewisburg, PA	Stadium	W 27–3	2,007
October 13	12:00 p.m.	Cornell*	No. 20	Crown Field at Andy Kerr Stadium; Hamilton, NY (rivalry)	Stadium	W 31–0	3,112
October 27	1:00 p.m.	Georgetown	No. 16	Crown Field at Andy Kerr Stadium; Hamilton, NY	Stadium	W 38–0	1,827
November 3	1:00 p.m.	at Fordham	No. 12	Coffey Field; Bronx, NY	Stadium	W 41–0	2,591
November 10	12:30 p.m.	at Lehigh	No. 10	Goodman Stadium; Bethlehem, PA	Stadium	W 48–6	6,633
November 17	12:00 p.m.	at Army*	No. 8	Michie Stadium; West Point, NY	CBSSN	L 14–28	26,086
December 1	1:00 p.m.	No. 6 James Madison*	No. 9	Crown Field at Andy Kerr Stadium; Hamilton, NY (NCAA Division I Second Round)	ESPN3	W 23–20	6,418
December 8	12:00 p.m.	at No. 1 North Dakota State*	No. 9	Fargodome; Fargo, ND (NCAA Division I Quarterfinal)	ESPN	L 0–35	16,404
*Non-conference game; ^{†}Homecoming; Rankings from STATS Poll released prior to the game; All times are in Eastern time

== Game summaries ==
=== Holy Cross ===
	1	2	3	4	Total
Crusaders	0	0	3	14	17
Raiders	14	10	0	0	24

=== At New Hampshire ===
	1	2	3	4	Total
Raiders	0	10	0	0	10
No. 20 Wildcats	0	3	0	0	3

=== Lafayette ===
	1	2	3	4	Total
Leopards	0	0	0	0	0
Raiders	15	21	9	0	45

=== At William & Mary ===
	1	2	3	4	Total
No. 24 Raiders	10	6	7	0	23
Tribe	0	0	0	0	0

=== At Bucknell ===
	1	2	3	4	Total
No. 21 Raiders	0	17	3	7	27
Bison	0	0	3	0	3

=== Cornell ===
	1	2	3	4	Total
Big Red	0	0	0	0	0
No. 20 Raiders	7	3	14	7	31

=== Georgetown ===
	1	2	3	4	Total
Hoyas	0	0	0	0	0
No. 16 Raiders	0	24	0	14	38

=== At Fordham ===
	1	2	3	4	Total
No. 12 Raiders	14	17	0	10	41
Rams	0	0	0	0	0

=== At Lehigh ===
	1	2	3	4	Total
No. 10 Raiders	7	20	21	0	48
Mountain Hawks	0	6	0	0	6

=== At Army ===
	1	2	3	4	Total
No. 8 Raiders	0	0	7	7	14
Black Knights	7	7	0	14	28

== FCS Playoffs ==
=== James Madison–Second Round ===
	1	2	3	4	Total
No. 6 Dukes	7	3	3	7	20
No. 9 Raiders	3	3	14	3	23

=== At North Dakota State–Quarterfinals ===
	1	2	3	4	Total
No. 9 Raiders	0	0	0	0	0
No. 1 Bison	7	7	14	7	35

== Ranking movements ==
Ranking movements Legend: ██ Increase in ranking ██ Decrease in ranking RV = Received votes
	Week													
Poll	Pre	1	2	3	4	5	6	7	8	9	10	11	12	Final
STATS FCS	RV	RV	RV	RV	24	21	20	17	16	12	10	8	9	8
Coaches	RV	RV	25	24	23	20	17	13	11	11	8	6	7	7
