= 2018 Campbell Fighting Camels football team =

American college football season

2018 Campbell Fighting Camels football
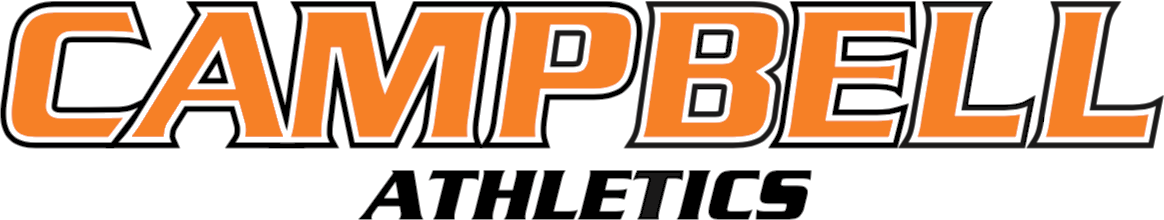
- Conference: Big South Conference
- Record: 6–5 (1–4 Big South)
- Head coach: Mike Minter (6th season)
- Offensive coordinator: David Marsh (2nd season)
- Defensive coordinator: Craig Cox (6th season)
- Home stadium: Barker–Lane Stadium

2018 Big South Conference football standings
	Conf.			Overall
Team	W		L	W		L
No. 5 Kennesaw State $^	5	–	0	11	–	2
Monmouth	4	–	1	8	–	3
Charleston Southern	3	–	2	5	–	6
Gardner–Webb	2	–	3	3	–	8
Campbell	1	–	4	6	–	5
Presbyterian	0	–	5	2	–	8
$ – Conference champion; ^ – FCS playoff participant; Rankings from STATS Poll

The 2018 Campbell Fighting Camels football team represented Campbell University in the 2018 NCAA Division I FCS football season. They were led by sixth-year head coach Mike Minter and played their home games at Barker–Lane Stadium. They were first-year members of the Big South Conference. They finished the season 6–5, 1–4 in Big South play to finish in fifth place.

== Preseason ==
=== Big South poll ===
In the Big South preseason poll released on July 23, 2018, the Fighting Camels were predicted to finish in fifth place.

=== Preseason All-Big South team ===
The Big South released their preseason all-Big South team on July 23, 2018, with the Fighting Camels having one player selected along with two more on the honorable mention list.

Defense

Jack Ryan – LB

Honorable mention

Aaron Blockmon – WR

Jaquan Brooks – PR

=== Award watch lists ===
Award	Player	Position	Year
Walter Payton Award	Daniel Smith	QB	So

== Schedule ==
Date	Time	Opponent	Site	TV	Result	Attendance
August 30	7:00 p.m.	Chowan*	Barker–Lane Stadium; Buies Creek, NC	ESPN+	W 49–26	5,624
September 8	12:30 p.m.	at Georgetown*	Cooper Field; Washington, D.C.	PL Net	W 13–8	1,837
September 12 (Note: The game between Coastal Carolina and Campbell, originally scheduled to be a home game for Coastal Carolina, was relocated to Barker–Lane Stadium and moved to Wednesday September 12 due to Hurricane Florence.)	2:00 p.m.	Coastal Carolina*	Barker–Lane Stadium; Buies Creek, North Carolina	ESPN3	L 21–58	2,047
September 22	6:00 p.m.	Shaw*	Barker–Lane Stadium; Buies Creek, North Carolina	ESPN+	W 42–0	4,857
September 29	6:00 p.m.	North Alabama*	Barker–Lane Stadium; Buies Creek, North Carolina	ESPN+	W 30–7	6,352
October 6	2:00 p.m.	Wagner*	Barker–Lane Stadium; Buies Creek, North Carolina	ESPN+	W 49–3	5,465
October 20	1:00 p.m.	at Monmouth	Kessler Stadium; West Long Branch, NJ	ESPN3	L 21–38	3,124
October 27	4:00 p.m.	Gardner–Webb^{†}	Barker–Lane Stadium; Buies Creek, North Carolina	ESPN3	L 7–35	6,712
November 3	2:00 p.m.	at No. 2 Kennesaw State	Fifth Third Bank Stadium; Kennesaw, GA	ESPN+	L 0–49	6,012
November 10	12:00 p.m.	at Presbyterian	Bailey Memorial Stadium; Clinton, SC	ESPN+	W 34–6	2,234
November 17	2:00 p.m.	Charleston Southern	Barker–Lane Stadium; Buies Creek, North Carolina	ESPN+	L 7–12	4,348
*Non-conference game; ^{†}Homecoming; Rankings from STATS Poll released prior to the game; All times are in Eastern time

== Game summaries ==
=== Chowan ===
	1	2	3	4	Total
Hawks	0	0	6	20	26
Fighting Camels	7	14	21	7	49

=== At Georgetown ===
	1	2	3	4	Total
Fighting Camels	3	0	7	3	13
Hoyas	0	6	0	2	8

=== Coastal Carolina ===
	1	2	3	4	Total
Chanticleers	7	17	21	13	58
Fighting Camels	14	7	0	0	21

=== Shaw ===
	1	2	3	4	Total
Bears	0	0	0	0	0
Fighting Camels	21	14	7	0	42

=== North Alabama ===
	1	2	3	4	Total
Lions	0	0	7	0	7
Fighting Camels	23	0	7	0	30

=== Wagner ===
	1	2	3	4	Total
Seahawks	3	0	0	0	3
Fighting Camels	21	14	7	7	49

=== At Monmouth ===
	1	2	3	4	Total
Fighting Camels	7	7	7	0	21
Hawks	10	7	14	7	38

=== Gardner–Webb ===
	1	2	3	4	Total
Runnin' Bulldogs	13	15	7	0	35
Fighting Camels	0	7	0	0	7

=== At Kennesaw State ===
	1	2	3	4	Total
Fighting Camels	0	0	0	0	0
No. 2 Owls	0	21	21	7	49

=== At Presbyterian ===
	1	2	3	4	Total
Fighting Camels	20	7	7	0	34
Blue Hose	6	0	0	0	6

=== Charleston Southern ===
	1	2	3	4	Total
Buccaneers	0	9	3	0	12
Fighting Camels	0	0	7	0	7
