= 2018 Hampton Pirates football team =

American college football season

2018 Hampton Pirates football
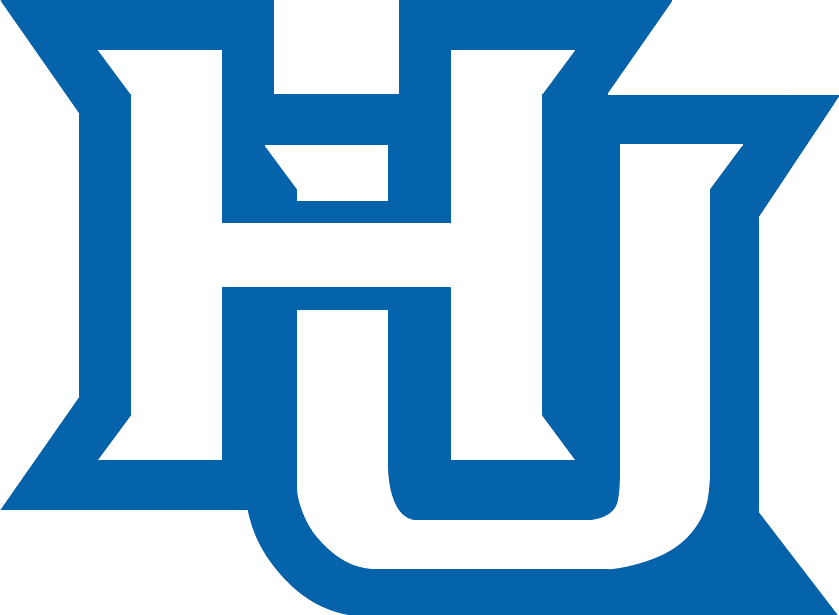
- Conference: Independent
- Record: 7–3
- Head coach: Robert Prunty (1st season)
- Offensive coordinator: Brian White (1st season)
- Co-defensive coordinators: Hank Hughes (1st season); Ryan Anderson (1st season)
- Home stadium: Armstrong Stadium

2018 NCAA Division I FCS independents football standings
	Conf.			Overall
Team	W		L	W		L
North Alabama		–		7	–	3
Hampton		–		7	–	3
North Dakota		–		6	–	5

The 2018 Hampton Pirates football team represented Hampton University in the 2018 NCAA Division I FCS football season. They were led by first-year head coach Robert Prunty and played their home games at Armstrong Stadium. They competed as an FCS independent.

On November 16, 2017, the school announced they would become a full member of the Big South Conference in 2018. Due to scheduling reasons, they were to remain in the Mid-Eastern Athletic Conference (MEAC) for football in 2018. However, the MEAC refused to allow Hampton to remain in the conference, with no MEAC schools agreeing to play them, forcing the Pirates to become an FCS independent for 2018 before joining the Big South in 2019.

== Schedule ==
Date	Time	Opponent	Site	TV	Result	Attendance
September 1	6:00 p.m.	Shaw	Armstrong Stadium; Hampton, VA	ESPN+	W 38–10	7,123
September 8	3:00 p.m.	at Monmouth	Kessler Stadium; West Long Branch, NJ	ESPN+	L 28–56	3,092
~~September 15~~	~~6:00 p.m.~~	~~Tennessee State~~	~~Armstrong Stadium~~; ~~Hampton, VA~~	~~ESPN+~~	Cancelled (Note: The Tennessee State game was cancelled in anticipation of Hurricane Florence.)	
September 22	5:00p.m.	at No. 25 Northern Iowa	UNI-Dome; Cedar Falls, IA	ESPN3	L 0–44	9,116
September 29	2:00 p.m.	Charleston Southern	Armstrong Stadium; Hampton, VA	ESPN+	L 14–48	5,124
October 6	2:00 p.m.	Lane	Armstrong Stadium; Hampton, VA	ESPN+	W 41–8	5,123
October 13	12:00 p.m.	at Presbyterian	Bailey Memorial Stadium; Clinton, SC	ESPN+	W 24–23	2,108
October 27	2:00 p.m.	Virginia–Lynchburg	Armstrong Stadium; Hampton, VA	ESPN+	W 51–28	8,750
November 3	1:00 p.m.	at SUNY Maritime	Reinhart Field; Bronx, NY		W 51–10	468
November 10	2:00 p.m.	at Mississippi Valley State	Rice–Totten Stadium; Itta Bena, MS		W 54–39	1,408
November 17	1:00 p.m.	St. Andrews	Armstrong Stadium; Hampton, VA	ESPN+	W 44–17	6,514
Rankings from STATS Poll released prior to the game; All times are in Eastern time

- Source: Schedule

== Game summaries ==
=== Shaw ===
	1	2	3	4	Total
Bears	0	7	0	3	10
Pirates	10	14	7	7	38

=== At Monmouth ===
	1	2	3	4	Total
Pirates	14	0	7	7	28
Hawks	7	21	21	7	56

=== At Northern Iowa ===
	1	2	3	4	Total
Pirates	0	0	0	0	0
No. 25 Panthers	10	10	21	3	44

=== Charleston Southern ===
	1	2	3	4	Total
Buccaneers	14	21	6	7	48
Pirates	0	14	0	0	14

=== Lane ===
	1	2	3	4	Total
Dragons	0	0	8	0	8
Pirates	17	3	14	7	41

=== At Presbyterian ===
	1	2	3	4	Total
Pirates	7	0	10	7	24
Blue Hose	10	7	0	6	23

=== Virginia–Lynchburg ===
	1	2	3	4	Total
Dragons	7	21	0	0	28
Pirates	20	10	7	14	51

=== At SUNY Maritime ===
	1	2	3	4	Total
Pirates	21	7	16	7	51
Privateers	0	3	0	7	10

=== At Mississippi Valley State ===
	1	2	3	4	Total
Pirates	28	12	14	0	54
Delta Devils	7	17	7	8	39

=== St. Andrews ===
	1	2	3	4	Total
Knights	0	17	0	0	17
Pirates	14	16	14	0	44
