= 2018 Holy Cross Crusaders football team =

American college football season

2018 Holy Cross Crusaders football
- Conference: Patriot League
- Record: 5–6 (4–2 Patriot)
- Head coach: Bob Chesney (1st season)
- Offensive coordinator: Patrick Murphy (1st season)
- Offensive scheme: Pro-style
- Defensive coordinator: Scott James (1st season)
- Base defense: 4–3
- Home stadium: Fitton Field

2018 Patriot League football standings
	Conf.			Overall
Team	W		L	W		L
No. 8 Colgate $^	6	–	0	10	–	2
Holy Cross	4	–	2	5	–	6
Georgetown	4	–	2	5	–	6
Lehigh	2	–	4	3	–	8
Lafayette	2	–	4	3	–	8
Fordham	2	–	4	2	–	9
Bucknell	1	–	5	1	–	10
$ – Conference champion; ^ – FCS playoff participant; Rankings from STATS Poll

The 2018 Holy Cross Crusaders football team represented the College of the Holy Cross as a member of the Patriot League during the 2018 NCAA Division I FCS football season. Led by first-year head coach Bob Chesney, Holy Cross compiled an overall record of 5–6 with a mark of 4–2 in conference play, tying for second place in the Patriot League. The Crusaders played their home games at Fitton Field in Worcester, Massachusetts.

== Preseason ==
=== Preseason coaches poll ===
The Patriot League released their preseason coaches poll on July 26, 2018, with the Crusaders predicted to finish in fourth place.

=== Preseason All-Patriot League team ===
The Crusaders placed four players on the preseason all-Patriot League team.

Offense

Blaise Bell – WR

Defense

Teddy Capsis – DL

Neil Vorster – DL

Ryan Brady – LB

== Schedule ==
Date	Time	Opponent	Site	TV	Result	Attendance
September 1	1:00 p.m.	at Colgate	Crown Field at Andy Kerr Stadium; Hamilton, NY	Stadium	L 17–24	5,304
September 8	1:00 p.m.	at Boston College*	Alumni Stadium; Chestnut Hill, MA (rivalry)	ACCN Extra	L 14–62	40,311
September 15	1:00 p.m.	Yale*	Fitton Field; Worcester, MA	Charter TV3	W 31–28 ^{OT}	7,397
September 22	1:00 p.m.	Dartmouth*	Fitton Field; Worcester, MA	Charter TV3	L 14–34	7,175
September 29	1:00 p.m.	Bucknell^{†}	Fitton Field; Worcester, MA	Charter TV3	L 16–19	8,275
October 6	1:00 p.m.	at New Hampshire*	Wildcat Stadium; Durham, NH	NBC Sports Boston	L 0–28	6,497
October 12	7:00 p.m.	at Harvard*	Harvard Stadium; Boston, MA	ESPN+	L 31–33	10,056
October 27	1:00 p.m.	Lehigh	Fitton Field; Worcester, MA	Charter TV3	W 56–0	1,779
November 3	12:30 p.m.	at Lafayette	Fisher Stadium; Easton, PA		W 40–14	3,914
November 10	12:00 p.m.	Fordham	Fitton Field; Worcester, MA (Ram–Crusader Cup)	Stadium	W 17–13	2,988
November 17	12:30 p.m.	at Georgetown	Cooper Field; Washington, DC		W 32–31	1,803
*Non-conference game; ^{†}Homecoming; All times are in Eastern time

== Game summaries ==
=== At Colgate ===
	1	2	3	4	Total
Crusaders	0	0	3	14	17
Raiders	14	10	0	0	24

=== At Boston College ===
	1	2	3	4	Total
Crusaders	0	0	7	7	14
Eagles	21	13	14	14	62

=== Yale ===
	1	2	3	4	OT	Total
Bulldogs	21	7	0	0	0	28
Crusaders	14	0	0	14	3	31

=== Dartmouth ===
	1	2	3	4	Total
Big Green	3	17	7	7	34
Crusaders	0	0	0	14	14

=== Bucknell ===
	1	2	3	4	Total
Bison	0	6	6	7	19
Crusaders	7	0	0	9	16

=== At New Hampshire ===
	1	2	3	4	Total
Crusaders	0	0	0	0	0
Wildcats	14	0	14	0	28

=== At Harvard ===
	1	2	3	4	Total
Crusaders	0	7	7	17	31
Crimson	9	11	10	3	33

=== Lehigh ===
	1	2	3	4	Total
Mountain Hawks	0	0	0	0	0
Crusaders	7	21	14	14	56

=== At Lafayette ===
	1	2	3	4	Total
Crusaders	0	17	23	0	40
Leopards	14	0	0	0	14

=== Fordham ===
	1	2	3	4	Total
Rams	7	3	0	3	13
Crusaders	0	0	14	3	17

=== At Georgetown ===
	1	2	3	4	Total
Crusaders	5	0	7	20	32
Hoyas	7	17	7	0	31
