= Robert Prunty =

American football coach

Biographical details
- Born: Chatham, Virginia, U.S.
- Education: Alabama A&M; Hargrave Military Academy

Coaching career (HC unless noted)
- 1993–2001: Gretna HS (VA)
- 2002–2009: Hargrave Military Academy (VA)
- 2010–2012: Texas Tech (OLB/DE)
- 2013: Cincinnati (AHC/DE)
- 2014–2016: Cincinnati (AHC/co-DC/DL)
- 2017: East Carolina (DC/DL)
- 2018–2023: Hampton

Head coaching record
- Overall: 26–29 (college)

Accomplishments and honors

Awards
- 2011 Scout.com Midlands Recruiter of Year; 2012 Scout.com Midlands Recruiter of Year; 2012 Scout.com/FOXSportsNext Big 12 Recruiter of the Year

Robert Prunty is an American college football coach. He was the head football coach at Hampton University from 2018 to 2023.

== Career ==
Prunty was the head football coach for Gretna High School in Gretna, Virginia for several years. During his tenure, he led the program from suffering 44 consecutive losses from 1991 to 1995, to an 11–1 season in 2001. After his departure from Gretna, the program went on to win four state championships from 2003 to 2008.

From Gretna, Prunty accepted a position as head football coach of Hargrave Military Academy. He was known for coaching players that went on to the National Football League (NFL). Twenty-seven of Prunty's players moved up to the NFL, included two first-round draft picks; Peria Jerry and Branden Albert Branden Albert would go on to credit Hargrave for his success.

Prunty held the position at Hargrave until the end of the 2009 season, accepting the position of defensive ends and outside linebackers coach for Texas Tech under head coach Tommy Tuberville. Hargrave Director of Communications, William Wiebking, expressed surprise at Prunty's departure, stating "We lost a good guy. They just came and plucked him away. We're all stunned.".

In 2011, following the highest ranked recruiting class in Texas Tech history, Prunty earned recognition from Scout.com as the Midlands Recruiter of the Year. Another highly ranked class was produced following the 5–7 2011 Texas Tech Red Raiders football season. Prunty's recruiting again earned him national recognition as the 2012 Scout.com Midlands Recruiter of the Year, as well as the 2011–12 Scout.com/FOXSportsNext Big 12 Recruiter of the Year.

In 2017, Prunty became the defensive line coach for East Carolina, but was promoted to defensive coordinator on September 10, 2017, replacing Kenwick Thompson, who was "reassigned" within the football program in a non-coaching role.

== Cincinnati ==
Following head coach Tommy Tuberville's departure to Cincinnati, Prunty remained a member of the Texas Tech staff through the 2012 Meineke Car Care Bowl of Texas. Following the game, it was announced on January 4, 2013 that Prunty would be following Tuberville to Cincinnati to accept the position of associate head coach and defensive ends coach.

== Head coaching record ==
=== College ===
Year	Team	Overall	Conference	Standing	Bowl/playoffs
Hampton Pirates (NCAA Division I FCS independent) (2018)
2018	Hampton	7–3			
Hampton Pirates (Big South Conference) (2019–2021)
2019	Hampton	5–7	1–5	T–5th	
2020–21	No team—COVID-19				
2021	Hampton	5–6	3–4	T–3rd	
Hampton Pirates (Colonial Athletic Association) (2022)
2022	Hampton	4–7	1–7	T–12th	
Hampton Pirates (Coastal Athletic Association Football Conference) (2023)
2023	Hampton	5–6	3–5	T–11th	
Hampton:		26–29	8–21		
Total:		26–29			
