= 2018 Gardner–Webb Runnin' Bulldogs football team =

American college football season

2018 Gardner–Webb Runnin' Bulldogs football
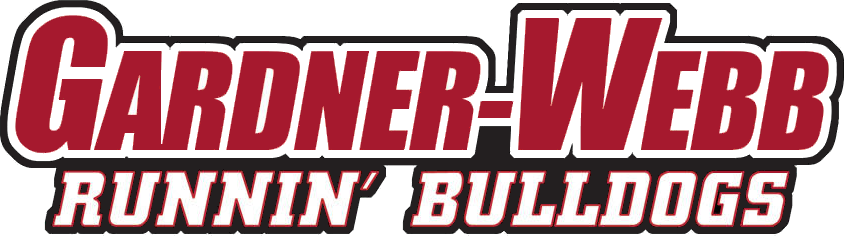
- Conference: Big South Conference
- Record: 3–8 (2–3 Big South)
- Head coach: Carroll McCray (6th season)
- Offensive coordinator: Brett Nichols (4th season)
- Home stadium: Ernest W. Spangler Stadium

2018 Big South Conference football standings
	Conf.			Overall
Team	W		L	W		L
No. 5 Kennesaw State $^	5	–	0	11	–	2
Monmouth	4	–	1	8	–	3
Charleston Southern	3	–	2	5	–	6
Gardner–Webb	2	–	3	3	–	8
Campbell	1	–	4	6	–	5
Presbyterian	0	–	5	2	–	8
$ – Conference champion; ^ – FCS playoff participant; Rankings from STATS Poll

The 2018 Gardner–Webb Runnin' Bulldogs football team represented Gardner–Webb University as a member of the Big South Conference during the 2018 NCAA Division I FCS football season. Led by sixth-year head coach Carroll McCray, the Runnin' Bulldogs compiled an overall record of 3–8 with a mark of 2–3 in conference play, placing fourth in the Big South. Gardner–Webb played home games at Ernest W. Spangler Stadium in Boiling Springs, North Carolina.

== Preseason ==
=== Big South poll ===
In the Big South preseason poll released on July 23, 2018, the Runnin' Bulldogs were predicted to finish in fourth place.

=== Preseason All-Big South team ===
The Big South released their preseason all-Big South team on July 23, 2018, with the Runnin' Bulldogs having two players on the honorable mention list.

Honorable mention

Will Millikan – OL

Josh Ramseur – DL

== Schedule ==
Date	Time	Opponent	Site	TV	Result	Attendance
September 1	6:00 p.m.	Limestone*	Ernest W. Spangler Stadium; Boiling Springs, NC	ESPN+	W 52–17	4,418
September 8	6:00 p.m.	at No. 5 North Carolina A&T*	BB&T Stadium; Greensboro, NC		L 6–45	13,111
September 14 (Note: This game was originally scheduled for September 15. It was moved up one day in anticipation of Hurricane Florence.)	6:00 p.m.	Western Carolina*	Ernest W. Spangler Stadium; Boiling Springs, NC	ESPN+	L 10–28	2,257
September 22	3:30 p.m.	at Appalachian State*	Kidd Brewer Stadium; Boone, NC	ESPN+	L 7–72	21,084
September 29	6:00 p.m.	No. 7 Wofford*	Ernest W. Spangler Stadium; Boiling Springs, NC	ESPN+	L 14–45	2,850
October 6	3:30 p.m.	at East Tennessee State*	William B. Greene Jr. Stadium; Johnson City, TN	ESPN3	L 0–45	8,501
October 13	1:30 p.m.	No. 3 Kennesaw State	Ernest W. Spangler Stadium; Boiling Springs, NC	ESPN3	L 17–56	4,150
October 27	4:00 p.m.	at Campbell	Barker–Lane Stadium; Buies Creek, NC	ESPN3	W 35–7	6,712
November 3	1:30 p.m.	Presbyterian	Ernest W. Spangler Stadium; Boiling Springs, NC	ESPN+	W 38–20	2,817
November 10	3:00 p.m.	at Charleston Southern	Buccaneer Field; North Charleston, SC	ESPN+	L 0–16	1,640
November 17	1:30 p.m.	Monmouth	Ernest W. Spangler Stadium; Boiling Springs, NC	ESPN+	L 42–56	2,350
*Non-conference game; Rankings from STATS Poll released prior to the game; All times are in Eastern time

== Game summaries ==
=== Limestone ===
	1	2	3	4	Total
Saints	10	0	0	7	17
Runnin' Bulldogs	7	28	10	7	52

=== At North Carolina A&T ===
	1	2	3	4	Total
Runnin' Bulldogs	3	3	0	0	6
No. 5 Aggies	7	10	14	14	45

=== Western Carolina ===
	1	2	3	4	Total
Catamounts	7	14	0	7	28
Runnin' Bulldogs	7	3	0	0	10

=== At Appalachian State ===
	1	2	3	4	Total
Runnin' Bulldogs	7	0	0	0	7
Mountaineers	28	24	14	6	72

=== Wofford ===
	1	2	3	4	Total
No. 7 Terriers	14	10	7	14	45
Runnin' Bulldogs	0	7	7	0	14

=== At East Tennessee State ===
	1	2	3	4	Total
Runnin' Bulldogs	0	0	0	0	0
Buccaneers	7	10	14	14	45

=== Kennesaw State ===
	1	2	3	4	Total
No. 3 Owls	7	21	14	14	56
Runnin' Bulldogs	3	0	0	14	17

=== At Campbell ===
	1	2	3	4	Total
Runnin' Bulldogs	13	15	7	0	35
Fighting Camels	0	7	0	0	7

=== Presbyterian ===
	1	2	3	4	Total
Blue Hose	0	7	0	13	20
Runnin' Bulldogs	14	7	17	0	38

=== At Charleston Southern ===
	1	2	3	4	Total
Runnin' Bulldogs	0	0	0	0	0
Buccaneers	3	13	0	0	16

=== Monmouth ===
	1	2	3	4	Total
Hawks	21	7	21	7	56
Runnin' Bulldogs	7	14	7	14	42
