= 2018 Georgetown Hoyas football team =

American college football season

2018 Georgetown Hoyas football
- Conference: Patriot League
- Record: 5–6 (4–2 Patriot)
- Head coach: Rob Sgarlata (5th season)
- Offensive coordinator: Rob Spence (1st season)
- Defensive coordinator: Kevin Doherty (2nd season)
- Home stadium: Cooper Field

Uniform
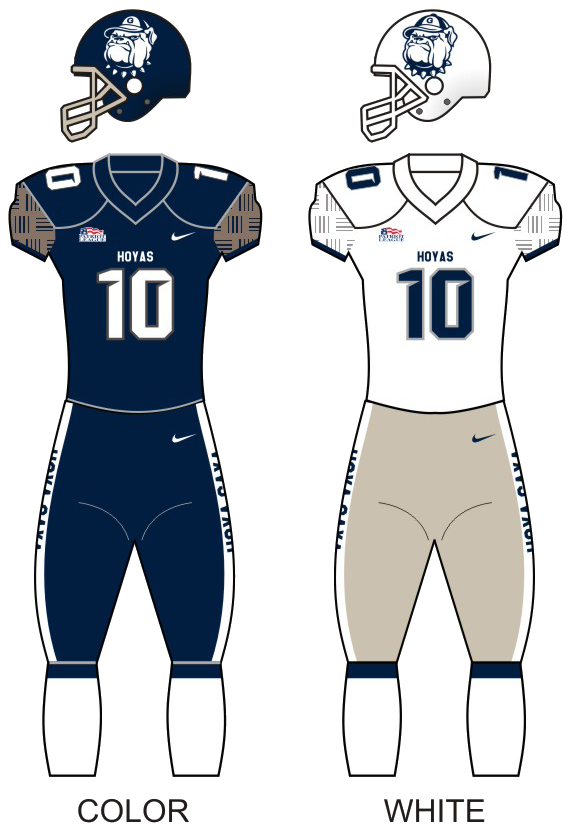

2018 Patriot League football standings
	Conf.			Overall
Team	W		L	W		L
No. 8 Colgate $^	6	–	0	10	–	2
Holy Cross	4	–	2	5	–	6
Georgetown	4	–	2	5	–	6
Lehigh	2	–	4	3	–	8
Lafayette	2	–	4	3	–	8
Fordham	2	–	4	2	–	9
Bucknell	1	–	5	1	–	10
$ – Conference champion; ^ – FCS playoff participant; Rankings from STATS Poll

The 2018 Georgetown Hoyas football team represented Georgetown University as a member of the Patriot League during the 2018 NCAA Division I FCS football season. Led by fifth-year head coach Rob Sgarlata, the Hoyas compiled an overall record of 5–6 with a mark of 4–2 in conference play, tying for second place in the Patriot League. Georgetown played home games at Cooper Field in Washington, D.C.

== Preseason ==
=== Preseason coaches poll ===
The Patriot League released their preseason coaches poll on July 26, 2018, with the Hoyas predicted to finish in last place.

=== Preseason All-Patriot League team ===
The Hoyas placed two players on the preseason all-Patriot League team.

Defense

Khristian Tate – DL

Special teams

Ahmad Wilson – Non-specialist player

== Schedule ==
Date	Time	Opponent	Site	TV	Result	Attendance
September 1	1:00 p.m.	at Marist*	Tenney Stadium at Leonidoff Field; Poughkeepsie, NY	RFN	W 39–14	1,904
September 8	12:30 p.m.	Campbell*	Cooper Field; Washington, DC	Stadium	L 8–13	1,837
September 15	1:30 p.m.	at Dartmouth*	Memorial Field; Hanover, NH	ESPN+	L 0–41	4,815
September 22	2:00 p.m.	Columbia*^{†}	Cooper Field; Washington, DC	Stadium	L 15–23	1,865
September 29	1:00 p.m.	at Brown*	Brown Stadium; Providence, RI	ESPN+	L 7–35	3,926
October 6	1:00 p.m.	at Fordham	Coffey Field; Bronx, NY	Stadium	W 23–11	2,010
October 13	3:30 p.m.	at Lafayette	Fisher Stadium; Easton, PA	Stadium	W 13–6	4,657
October 20	2:00 p.m.	Lehigh	Cooper Field; Washington, DC	Stadium	W 22–16 ^{2OT}	1,871
October 27	1:00 p.m.	at Colgate	Crown Field at Andy Kerr Stadium; Hamilton, NY	Stadium	L 0–38	1,827
November 10	12:30 p.m.	Bucknell	Cooper Field; Washington, DC	Stadium	W 14–3	1,825
November 17	12:30 p.m.	Holy Cross	Cooper Field; Washington, DC	Stadium	L 31–32	1,803
*Non-conference game; ^{†}Homecoming; All times are in Eastern time

== Game summaries ==
=== At Marist ===
	1	2	3	4	Total
Hoyas	11	0	21	7	39
Red Foxes	0	0	7	7	14

=== Campbell ===
	1	2	3	4	Total
Fighting Camels	3	0	7	3	13
Hoyas	0	6	0	2	8

=== At Dartmouth ===
	1	2	3	4	Total
Hoyas	0	0	0	0	0
Big Green	6	14	14	7	41

=== Columbia ===
	1	2	3	4	Total
Lions	10	0	6	7	23
Hoyas	0	0	0	15	15

=== At Brown ===
	1	2	3	4	Total
Hoyas	0	0	7	0	7
Bears	14	7	7	7	35

=== At Fordham ===
	1	2	3	4	Total
Hoyas	8	0	7	8	23
Rams	0	8	3	0	11

=== At Lafayette ===
	1	2	3	4	Total
Hoyas	0	13	0	0	13
Leopards	0	3	0	3	6

=== Lehigh ===
	1	2	3	4	OT	2OT	Total
Mountain Hawks	6	0	0	3	7	0	16
Hoyas	9	0	0	0	7	6	22

=== At Colgate ===
	1	2	3	4	Total
Hoyas	0	0	0	0	0
Raiders	0	24	0	14	38

=== Bucknell ===
	1	2	3	4	Total
Bison	0	0	3	0	3
Hoyas	0	7	7	0	14

=== Holy Cross ===
	1	2	3	4	Total
Crusaders	5	0	7	20	32
Hoyas	7	17	7	0	31
