= 2018 Monmouth Hawks football team =

American college football season

2018 Monmouth Hawks football
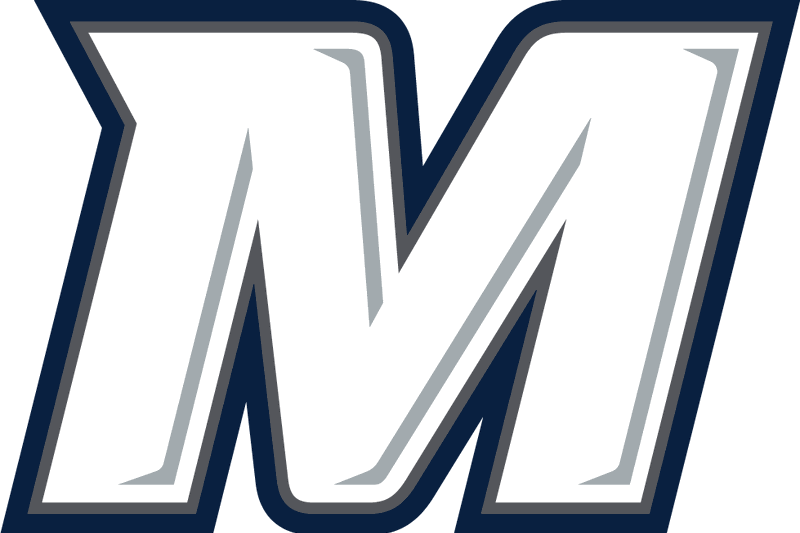
- Conference: Big South Conference
- Record: 8–3 (4–1 Big South)
- Head coach: Kevin Callahan (26th season)
- Offensive coordinator: Kevin Morris (4th season)
- Offensive scheme: Pro-style
- Defensive coordinator: Andy Bobik (25th season)
- Base defense: 4–3
- Home stadium: Kessler Field

2018 Big South Conference football standings
	Conf.			Overall
Team	W		L	W		L
No. 5 Kennesaw State $^	5	–	0	11	–	2
Monmouth	4	–	1	8	–	3
Charleston Southern	3	–	2	5	–	6
Gardner–Webb	2	–	3	3	–	8
Campbell	1	–	4	6	–	5
Presbyterian	0	–	5	2	–	8
$ – Conference champion; ^ – FCS playoff participant; Rankings from STATS Poll

The 2018 Monmouth Hawks football team represented Monmouth University in the 2018 NCAA Division I FCS football season as a member of the Big South Conference. They were led by 26th-year head coach Kevin Callahan and played their home games at Kessler Field in West Long Branch, New Jersey Monmouth finished the season 8–3 overall and 4–1 in Big South play to place second.

== Preseason ==
=== Big South poll ===
In the Big South preseason poll released on July 23, 2018, the Hawks were predicted to finish in second place.

=== Preseason All-Big South team ===
The Big South released their preseason all-Big South team on July 23, 2018, with the Hawks having six players at seven positions selected along with two more on the honorable mention list.

Offense

Pete Guerriero – RB

Reggie White Jr. – WR

Jake Powell – TE

Ryan Wetzel – OL

Russ Clayton – OL

Defense

Tymere Berry – DB

Special teams

Pete Guerriero – KR

Honorable mention

Kenji Bahar – OB

Diego Zubieta – LB

== Schedule ==
Date	Time	Opponent	Site	TV	Result	Attendance
August 31	6:30 p.m.	at Eastern Michigan*	Rynearson Stadium; Ypsilanti, MI	ESPN+	L 17–51	14,357
September 8	3:00 p.m.	Hampton*	Kessler Stadium; West Long Branch, NJ	ESPN+	W 56–28	3,092
September 15	6:00 p.m.	at Lafayette*	Fisher Stadium; Easton, PA	Stadium	W 24–20	4,325
September 22	4:30 p.m.	at Princeton*	Powers Field at Princeton Stadium; Princeton, NJ	ESPN+	L 9–51	11,068
September 29	1:00 p.m.	Wagner*	Kessler Stadium; West Long Branch, NJ	ESPN+	W 54–47	3,971
October 13	1:00 p.m.	Bucknell*	Kessler Stadium; West Long Branch, NJ	ESPN+	W 36–19	2,452
October 20	1:00 p.m.	Campbell^{†}	Kessler Stadium; West Long Branch, NJ	ESPN3	W 38–21	3,124
October 27	2:30 p.m.	at Presbyterian	Bailey Memorial Stadium; Clinton, SC	ESPN+	W 24–14	2,638
November 3	1:00 p.m.	Charleston Southern	Kessler Stadium; West Long Branch, NJ	ESPN3	W 37–3	4,492
November 10	12:00 p.m.	No. 2 Kennesaw State	Kessler Stadium; West Long Branch, NJ	ESPN3	L 14–51	2,332
November 17	1:30 p.m.	at Gardner–Webb	Ernest W. Spangler Stadium; Boiling Springs, NC	ESPN+	W 56–42	2,350
*Non-conference game; ^{†}Homecoming; Rankings from STATS Poll released prior to the game; All times are in Eastern time

== Game summaries ==
=== At Eastern Michigan ===
	1	2	3	4	Total
Hawks	0	3	7	7	17
Eagles	13	17	14	7	51

=== Hampton ===
	1	2	3	4	Total
Pirates	14	0	7	7	28
Hawks	7	21	21	7	56

=== At Lafayette ===
	1	2	3	4	Total
Hawks	6	9	6	3	24
Leopards	13	7	0	0	20

=== At Princeton ===
	1	2	3	4	Total
Hawks	9	0	0	0	9
Tigers	14	16	14	0	44

=== Wagner ===
	1	2	3	4	Total
Seahawks	21	12	7	7	47
Hawks	8	21	3	22	54

=== Bucknell ===
	1	2	3	4	Total
Bison	0	6	7	6	19
Hawks	0	9	7	20	36

=== Campbell ===
	1	2	3	4	Total
Fighting Camels	7	7	7	0	21
Hawks	10	7	14	7	38

=== At Presbyterian ===
	1	2	3	4	Total
Hawks	3	0	7	14	24
Blue Hose	0	0	7	7	14

=== Charleston Southern ===
	1	2	3	4	Total
Buccaneers	0	0	3	0	3
Hawks	7	17	3	10	37

=== Kennesaw State ===
	1	2	3	4	Total
No. 2 Owls	7	10	14	20	51
Hawks	7	7	0	0	14

=== At Gardner–Webb ===
	1	2	3	4	Total
Hawks	21	7	21	7	56
Runnin' Bulldogs	7	14	7	14	42
