= 2018 Charleston Southern Buccaneers football team =

American college football season

2018 Charleston Southern Buccaneers football
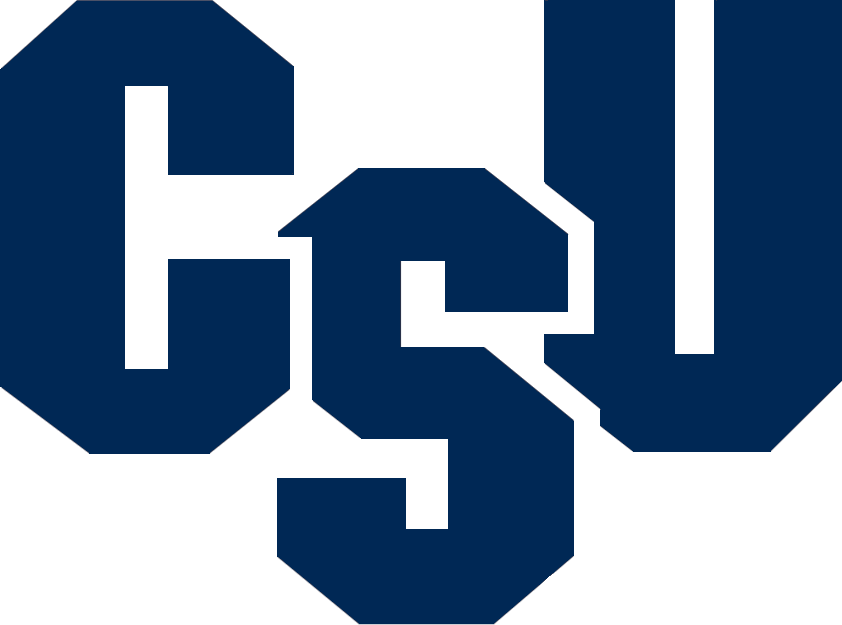
- Conference: Big South Conference
- Record: 5–6 (3–2 Big South)
- Head coach: Mark Tucker (2nd season)
- Defensive coordinator: Zane Vance (2nd season)
- Home stadium: Buccaneer Field

2018 Big South Conference football standings
	Conf.			Overall
Team	W		L	W		L
No. 5 Kennesaw State $^	5	–	0	11	–	2
Monmouth	4	–	1	8	–	3
Charleston Southern	3	–	2	5	–	6
Gardner–Webb	2	–	3	3	–	8
Campbell	1	–	4	6	–	5
Presbyterian	0	–	5	2	–	8
$ – Conference champion; ^ – FCS playoff participant; Rankings from STATS Poll

The 2018 Charleston Southern Buccaneers football team represented Charleston Southern University as a member of the Big South Conference during the 2018 NCAA Division I FCS football season. Led by Mark Tucker in his second and final season as head coach, the Buccaneers compiled an overall record of 5–6 with a mark of 3–2 in conference play, placing third in the Big South. Charleston Southern played home games at Buccaneer Field in Charleston, South Carolina.

== Preseason ==
=== Big South poll ===
In the Big South preseason poll released on July 23, 2018, the Buccaneers were predicted to finish in third place.

=== Preseason All-Big South team ===
The Big South released their preseason all-Big South team on July 23, 2018, with the Buccaneers having seven players selected along with three more on the honorable mention list.

Offense

Kameron Brown – WR

Defense

Solomon Brown – DL

Johnny Robinson – DL

J.D. Sosebee – LB

Shadarius Hopkins – DB

Special teams

Kyle Reighard – P

Taz Lindsey – PR

Honorable mention

Brandon Rowland – DB

Tyler Tekac – K

Ethan Ray – LS

== Schedule ==
Date	Time	Opponent	Site	TV	Result	Attendance
September 1	7:30 p.m.	at Florida*	Ben Hill Griffin Stadium; Gainesville, FL	SECN	L 6–53	81,164
September 22	6:00 p.m.	No. 12 Elon*	Buccaneer Field; North Charleston, SC	ESPN+	L 22–31	2,465
September 29	2:00 p.m.	at Hampton*	Armstrong Stadium; Hampton, VA	ESPN+	W 48–14	5,124
October 6	6:00 p.m.	at Savannah State*	Ted Wright Stadium; Savannah, GA	ESPN3	L 3–23	2,970
October 13	6:00 p.m.	Virginia–Lynchburg*	Buccaneer Field; North Charleston, SC	ESPN+	W 58–6	1,473
October 20	6:00 p.m.	Presbyterian^{†}	Buccaneer Field; North Charleston, SC	ESPN+	W 41–7	2,000
October 27	6:00 p.m.	No. 2 Kennesaw State	Buccaneer Field; North Charleston, SC	ESPN+	L 10–38	1,242
November 3	1:00 p.m.	at Monmouth	Kessler Stadium; West Long Branch, NJ	ESPN3	L 3–37	1,492
November 10	3:00 p.m.	Gardner–Webb	Buccaneer Field; North Charleston, SC	ESPN+	W 16–0	1,640
November 17	2:00 p.m.	at Campbell	Barker–Lane Stadium; Buies Creek, NC	ESPN+	W 12–7	4,348
November 29 (Note: This game was originally scheduled for September 15, but it was rescheduled in anticipation of Hurricane Florence.)	7:00 p.m.	at The Citadel*	Johnson Hagood Stadium; Charleston, SC	ESPN+	L 14–43	7,877
*Non-conference game; ^{†}Homecoming; Rankings from STATS Poll released prior to the game; All times are in Eastern time

== Game summaries ==
=== At Florida ===
	1	2	3	4	Total
Buccaneers	0	0	0	6	6
Gators	10	28	13	2	53

=== Elon ===
	1	2	3	4	Total
No. 12 Phoenix	3	7	21	0	31
Buccaneers	13	6	3	0	22

=== At Hampton ===
	1	2	3	4	Total
Buccaneers	14	21	6	7	48
Pirates	0	14	0	0	14

=== At Savannah State ===
	1	2	3	4	Total
Buccaneers	0	3	0	0	3
Tigers	7	7	0	9	23

=== Virginia–Lynchburg ===
	1	2	3	4	Total
Dragons	0	0	0	6	6
Buccaneers	3	20	14	21	58

=== Presbyterian ===
	1	2	3	4	Total
Blue Hose	7	0	0	0	7
Buccaneers	0	17	17	7	41

=== Kennesaw State ===
	1	2	3	4	Total
No. 2 Owls	7	17	7	7	38
Buccaneers	3	7	0	0	10

=== At Monmouth ===
	1	2	3	4	Total
Buccaneers	0	0	3	0	3
Hawks	7	17	3	10	37

=== Gardner–Webb ===
	1	2	3	4	Total
Runnin' Bulldogs	0	0	0	0	0
Buccaneers	3	13	0	0	16

=== At Campbell ===
	1	2	3	4	Total
Buccaneers	0	9	3	0	12
Fighting Camels	0	0	7	0	7

=== At The Citadel ===
	1	2	3	4	Total
Buccaneers	0	14	0	0	14
Bulldogs	14	23	3	3	43
