= 2018 Presbyterian Blue Hose football team =

American college football season

2018 Presbyterian Blue Hose football
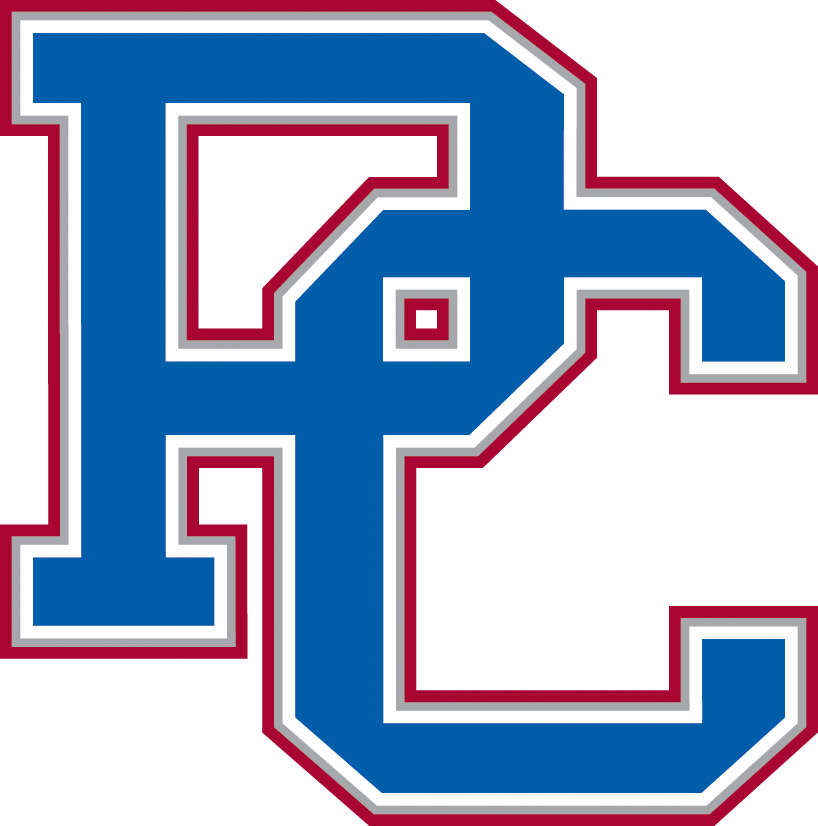
- Conference: Big South Conference
- Record: 2–8 (0–5 Big South)
- Head coach: Tommy Spangler (2nd season of stint, 8th overall season)
- Home stadium: Bailey Memorial Stadium

2018 Big South Conference football standings
	Conf.			Overall
Team	W		L	W		L
No. 5 Kennesaw State $^	5	–	0	11	–	2
Monmouth	4	–	1	8	–	3
Charleston Southern	3	–	2	5	–	6
Gardner–Webb	2	–	3	3	–	8
Campbell	1	–	4	6	–	5
Presbyterian	0	–	5	2	–	8
$ – Conference champion; ^ – FCS playoff participant; Rankings from STATS Poll

The 2018 Presbyterian Blue Hose football team represented Presbyterian College in the 2018 NCAA Division I FCS football season. They were led by second-year head coach Tommy Spangler, in his second stint as PC head coach, as he coached the Blue Hose from 2001–06. The Blue Hose played their home games at Bailey Memorial Stadium as a member of the Big South Conference. They finished the season 2–8, 0–5 in Big South play to finish in last place.

== Preseason ==
=== Big South poll ===
In the Big South preseason poll released on July 23, 2018, the Blue Hose were predicted to finish in last place.

=== Preseason All-Big South team ===
The Big South released their preseason all-Big South team on July 23, 2018, with the Blue Hose having one player on the honorable mention list.

Honorable mention

Riley Hilton – TE

== Schedule ==
Date	Time	Opponent	Site	TV	Result	Attendance
September 8	7:00 p.m.	at Austin Peay*	Fortera Stadium; Clarksville, TN	ESPN+	L 0–24	5,166
~~September 15~~	~~1:00 p.m.~~	at ~~Stetson*~~	~~Spec Martin Stadium~~; ~~DeLand, FL~~	~~ESPN+~~	Cancelled (Note: This game was originally scheduled to be played in Clinton. It was moved to DeLand in anticipation of Hurricane Florence before being cancelled.)	
September 22	7:00 p.m.	Bluefield*	Bailey Memorial Stadium; Clinton, SC	ESPN+	W 41–10	2,064
September 27	7:00 p.m.	Lindsey Wilson*	Bailey Memorial Stadium; Clinton, SC	ESPN+	W 10–0 (Note: This game was added as a replacement for the cancelled Stetson game.)	1,243
October 6	2:00 p.m.	at Kennesaw State	Fifth Third Bank Stadium; Kennesaw, GA	ESPN3	L 0–56	6,414
October 13	12:00 p.m.	Hampton*	Bailey Memorial Stadium; Clinton, SC	ESPN+	L 24–25	2,108
October 20	6:00 p.m.	at Charleston Southern	Buccaneer Field; North Charleston, SC	ESPN+	L 7–41	2,000
October 27	2:30 p.m.	Monmouth^{†}	Bailey Memorial Stadium; Clinton, SC	ESPN+	L 14–24	2,638
November 3	1:30 p.m.	at Gardner–Webb	Ernest W. Spangler Stadium; Boiling Springs, NC	ESPN+	L 20–38	2,817
November 10	12:00 p.m.	Campbell	Bailey Memorial Stadium; Clinton, SC	ESPN+	L 6–34	2,234
November 17	1:30 p.m.	at No. 13 Wofford*	Gibbs Stadium; Spartanburg, SC	ESPN+	L 21–45	5,674
*Non-conference game; ^{†}Homecoming; Rankings from STATS Poll released prior to the game; All times are in Eastern time

== Game summaries ==
=== At Austin Peay ===
Presbyterian Blue Hose at Austin Peay Governors

Quarter	1	2	3	4	Total
Blue Hose	0	0	0	0	0
Governors	0	10	7	7	24

at Fortera Stadium • Clarksville, TN

- Date: September 8
- Game time: 7:00 p.m. ET
- Game weather: Temperature: 76 °F (24 °C) • Weather: Overcast • Wind: SW 2 mph
- Game attendance: 5,166
- Referee: Stephen Hazle
- TV: ESPN+

Game information

First Quarter
No scoring
Second Quarter

- (6:27) AP – Oatsvall 13 yard rush, Birchfield kick
- (1:30) AP – Birchfield 24 yard FG

Third Quarter

- (10:52) AP – Momodu 3 yard rush, Birchfield kick

Fourth Quarter

- (11:50) AP – Craig 8 yard rush, Birchfield kick

Top Passers

- PRES – John Walker: 12/23, 94 yards, 1 INT
- AP – JaVaughn Craig: 11/18, 127 yards

Top Rushers

- PRES – Jarius Jeter: 16 carries, 61 yards
- AP – JaVaughn Craig: 8 carries, 108 yards, 1 TD

Top Receiving

- PRES – Keith Pearson: 4 receptions, 38 yards
- AP – DJ Montgomery: 10 receptions, 114 yards

=== Bluefield ===
Bluefield Rams at Presbyterian Blue Hose

Quarter	1	2	3	4	Total
Rams	3	7	0	0	10
Blue Hose	7	21	6	7	41

at Bailey Memorial Stadium • Clinton, SC

- Date: September 22
- Game time: 7:00 p.m. ET
- Game weather: Temperature: 80 °F (27 °C) • Weather: Partly Cloudy, hot • Wind: Calm
- Game attendance: 2,064
- Referee: Terrance Lamar
- TV: ESPN+

Game information

First Quarter

- (7:29) BLUE – Tanner Griffith 33-yard field goal
- (0:00) PRES – Zola Davis 6-yard run (Gardner Duckworth kick)

Second Quarter

- (12:34) BLUE – Antonio Strickland 7-yard pass from Shiloh Ward (Tanner Griffith kick)
- (8:50) PRES – Keith Pearson 46-yard pass from John Walker (Gardner Duckworth kick)
- (5:57) PRES – Riley Hilton 5-yard pass from John Walker (Gardner Duckworth kick)
- (1:31) PRES – DaShawn Davis 17-yard pass from John Walker (Gardner Duckworth kick)

Third Quarter

- (12:50) PRES – DaShawn Davis 29-yard pass from Keith Pearson (Gardner Duckworth kick failed)

Fourth Quarter

- (7:33) PRES – Robert Baker 34-yard interception (Gardner Duckworth kick)

Top Passers

- BLUE – Shiloh Ward: 8/20, 101 yards, TD, INT
- PRES – John Walker: 16/25, 199 yards, 3 TD, INT

Top Rushers

- BLUE – LaSedrick King: 7 carries, 62 yards
- PRES – Zola Davis: 18 carries, 108 yards, TD

Top Receiving

- BLUE – Antonio Strickland: 2 receptions, 39 yards, TD
- PRES – Keith Pearson: 6 receptions, 101 yards, TD

Leading Tacklers

- BLUE – Michael Everett: 14 tackles
- PRES – Jarrett Nagy: 10 tackles

This win was the 500th in program history for Presbyterian.

=== Lindsey Wilson ===
Lindsey Wilson Blue Raiders at Presbyterian Blue Hose

Quarter	1	2	3	4	Total
Blue Raiders	0	0	0	0	0
Blue Hose	3	0	0	7	10

at Bailey Memorial Stadium • Clinton, SC

- Date: September 27
- Game time: 7:00 p.m. ET
- Game weather: 80 °F (27 °C) • Wind: calm
- Game attendance: 1,243
- Referee: Marcus Woods
- TV: ESPN+

Game information

First Quarter

- (6:00) PRES – Duckworth 33 yard FG

Second Quarter
No scoring
Third Quarter
No scoring
Fourth Quarter

- (14:45) PRES – Davis 7 yard pass from Walker, Duckworth kick

Top Passers

- LW – Cameron Dukes: 12/26, 139 yards, 1 INT
- PRES – John Walker: 19/26, 155 yards, 1 TD

Top Rushers

- LW – Blake Ingleton: 17 carries, 73 yards
- PRES – Jarius Jeter: 12 carries, 94 yards

Top Receiving

- LW – Cam Wyche: 4 receptions, 68 yards
- PRES – DaShawn Davis: 9 receptions, 78 yards, 1 TD

=== At Kennesaw State ===
Presbyterian Blue Hose at Kennesaw State Owls

Quarter	1	2	3	4	Total
Blue Hose	0	0	0	0	0
No. 4 Owls	14	14	21	7	56

at Fifth Third Bank Stadium • Kennesaw, GA

- Date: October 6
- Game time: 2:00 p.m. ET
- Game attendance: 6,414
- Referee: Marcus Woods
- TV announcers (ESPN3): Brian Katrek, Tutan Reyes, Chris Mooneyham, Lauren Hoffman

Game information

First Quarter

- (12:24) KSU – Darnell Holland 25-yard pass from Chandler Burks (Justin Thompson kick)
- (1:24) KSU – Chandler Burks 1-yard run (Justin Thompson kick)

Second Quarter

- (9:49) KSU – Chandler Burks 10-yard run (Justin Thompson kick)
- (1:27) KSU – Chandler Burks 3-yard run (Justin Thompson kick)

Third Quarter

- (11:34) KSU – Chandler Burks 38-yard run (Justin Thompson kick)
- (8:38) KSU – Isaac Foster 12-yard run (Justin Thompson kick)
- (1:27) KSU – David Daniel 1-yard run (Justin Thompson kick)

Fourth Quarter

- (5:36) KSU – Kevin Ficklin 55-yard pass from Tommy Bryant (Nathan Robertson kick)

Top Passers

- PRES – Jordan Morgan: 5/6, 63 yards
- KSU – Tommy Bryant: 2/2, 56 yards, TD

Top Rushers

- PRES – Jarius Jeter: 11 carries, 30 yards
- KSU – Chandler Burks: 16 carries, 135 yards, 4 TD

Top Receiving

- PRES – Keith Pearson: 5 receptions, 84 yards
- KSU – Kevin Ficklin: 1 reception, 55 yards, TD

Leading Tacklers

- PRES – Trent Carrington: 15 tackles
- KSU – Anthony Gore: 4 tackles

=== Hampton ===
Hampton Pirates at Presbyterian Blue Hose

Quarter	1	2	3	4	Total
Pirates	7	0	10	7	24
Blue Hose	10	7	0	6	23

at Bailey Memorial Stadium • Clinton, SC

- Date: October 13
- Game time: 12:00 p.m. ET
- Game weather: Temperature: 68 °F (20 °C) • Weather: Clear, sunny • Wind: N 0/5
- Game attendance: 2,108
- Referee: Marcus Woods
- TV: ESPN+

Game information

First Quarter

- (6:35) PRES – Gardner Duckworth 20-yard field goal
- (3:45) HAMP – Byron Barney 11-yard pass from Delmon Williams (Evan Lomax kick)
- (2:31) PRES – Dohnte Meyers 50-yard pass from John Walker (Gardner Duckworth kick)

Second Quarter

- (5:21) PRES – Keith Pearson 35-yard pass from John Walker (Gardner Duckworth kick)

Third Quarter

- (11:02) HAMP – Delmon Williams 1-yard run (Evan Lomax kick)
- (3:19) HAMP – Evan Lomax 25-yard field goal

Fourth Quarter

- (10:48) HAMP – Will Robinson 11-yard run (Evan Lomax kick)
- (2:08) PRES – Jordan Morgan 5-yard run (Gardner Duckworth kick failed)

Top Passers

- HAMP – Delmon Williams: 17/33, 105 yards, TD, INT
- PRES – John Walker: 22/32, 251 yards, 2 TD, INT

Top Rushers

- HAMP – Will Robinson: 24 carries, 154 yards, TD
- PRES – Jarius Jeter: 13 carries, 27 yards

Top Receiving

- HAMP – Byron Barney: 5 receptions, 43 yards, TD
- PRES – Dohnte Meyers: 4 receptions, 92 yards, TD

Leading Tacklers

- HAMP – Tyler Frazier: 8 tackles
- PRES – Jarrett Nagy: 12 tackles

=== At Charleston Southern ===
Presbyterian Blue Hose at Charleston Southern

Quarter	1	2	3	4	Total
Blue Hose	7	0	0	0	7
Buccaneers	0	17	17	7	41

at Buccaneer Field • North Charleston, SC

- Date: October 20
- Game time: 6:00 p.m. ET
- Game attendance: 2,000
- Referee: Duane Heydt
- TV: ESPN+

Game information

First Quarter

- (8:49) PRES – DaShawn Davis 8-yard pass from John Walker (Gardner Duckworth kick)

Second Quarter

- (10:59) CSU – Taz Lindsey 24-yard pass from London Johnson (Tyler Tekac kick)
- (10:48) CSU – Jonathan Slaton 17-yard interception return (Tyler Tekac kick)
- (0:15) CSU – Tyler Tekac 32-yard field goal

Third Quarter

- (12:43) CSU – Garris Schwarting 20-yard fumble recovery (Tyler Tekac kick)
- (10:59) CSU – Terrence Wilson 1-yard run (Tyler Tekac kick)
- (6:50) CSU – Tyler Tekac 44-yard field goal

Fourth Quarter

- (14:55) CSU – London Johnson 1-yard run (Tyler Tekac kick)

Top Passers

- PRES – John Walker: 12/19, 86 yards, TD, INT
- CSU – London Johnson: 6/9, 104 yards, TD

Top Rushers

- PRES – Jarius Jeter: 14 carries, 66 yards
- CSU – London Johnson: 18 carries, 67 yards, TD

Top Receiving

- PRES – DaShawn Davis: 5 receptions, 36 yards, TD
- CSU – Taz Lindsey: 5 receptions, 64 yards, TD

Leading Tacklers

- PRES – Colby Campbell: 7 tackles
- CSU – Brandon Rowland: 6 tackles

=== Monmouth ===
Monmouth Hawks at Presbyterian Blue Hose

Quarter	1	2	3	4	Total
Hawks	3	0	7	14	24
Blue Hose	0	0	7	7	14

at Bailey Memorial Stadium • Clinton, SC

- Date: October 27
- Game time: 2:30 p.m. ET
- Game weather: Temperature: 63 °F (17 °C) • Weather: Partly Sunny • Wind: 13 WSW
- Game attendance: 2,638
- Referee: Tra Blake
- TV: ESPN+

Game information

First Quarter

- (9:14) MON – Matt Mosquera 49-yard field goal

Second Quarter

No scoring

Third Quarter

- (13:10) PRES – Dirk Cureton 41-yard fumble recovery (Gardner Duckworth kick)
- (1:31) MON – Reggie White Jr. 40-yard pass from Kenji Bahar (Matt Mosquera kick)

Fourth Quarter

- (9:23) MON – Reggie White Jr. 38-yard pass from Kenji Bahar (Matt Mosquera kick)
- (6:44) PRES – Dohnte Meyers 11-yard pass from John Walker (Gardner Duckworth kick)
- (0:25) MON – Vinny Grasso 27-yard run (Matt Mosquera kick)

Top Passers

- MON – Kenji Bahar: 18/35, 268 yards, 2 TD, INT
- PRES – John Walker: 23/42, 191 yards, TD, 2 INT

Top Rushers

- MON – Juwon Farri: 16 carries, 84 yards
- PRES – Jarius Jeter: 10 carries, 27 yards

Top Receiving

- MON – Reggie White Jr.: 6 receptions, 117 yards, 2 TD
- PRES – Keith Pearson: 9 receptions, 81 yards

Leading Tacklers

- MON – Tymere Berry: 8 tackles
- PRES – Jarrett Nagy: 12 tackles

=== At Gardner–Webb ===
Presbyterian Blue Hose at Gardner–Webb Runnin' Bulldogs

Quarter	1	2	3	4	Total
Blue Hose	0	7	0	13	20
Bulldogs	14	7	17	0	38

at Ernest W. Spangler Stadium • Boiling Springs, NC

- Date: November 3
- Game time: 1:30 p.m. ET
- Game weather: Temperature: 56 °F (13 °C) • Weather: Sunny, crisp • Wind: 5 NNW
- Game attendance: 2,817
- Referee: Gary Patterson
- TV: ESPN+

Game information

First Quarter

- (9:43) GWU – Kyle Horton 74-yard pass from Jordan Smith (Tre' Jackson kick)
- (0:47) GWU – Kyle Horton 10-yard pass from Jordan Smith (Tre' Jackson kick)

Second Quarter

- (12:15) GWU – Izaiah Gathings 8-yard pass from Jordan Smith (Tre' Jackson kick)
- (3:01) PRES – Jordan Morgan 9-yard run (Gardner Duckworth kick)

Third Quarter

- (10:24) GWU – Jordan Smith 3-yard run (Tre' Jackson kick)
- (6:00) GWU – Tre' Jackson 19-yard field goal
- (1:05) GWU – Jayln Cagle 1-yard run (Tre' Jackson)

Fourth Quarter

- (11:04) PRES – Wesley Potter 28-yard pass from Jordan Morgan (Gardner Duckworth kick failed)
- (5:41) PRES – DaShawn Davis 26-yard pass from Jordan Morgan (Gardner Duckworth kick)

Top Passers

- PRES – Jordan Morgan: 8/16, 123 yards, 2 TD
- GWU – Jordan Smith: 14/26, 251 yards, 3 TD, INT

Top Rushers

- PRES – Jordan Morgan: 11 carries, 99 yards, TD
- GWU – Jayln Cagle: 14 carries, 105 yards, TD

Top Receiving

- PRES – Keith Pearson: 7 receptions, 103 yards
- GWU – Kyle Horton: 6 receptions, 159 yards

Leading Tacklers

- PRES – Colby Campbell: 11 tackles
- GWU – Darien Reynolds: 14 tackles

=== Campbell ===
Campbell Fighting Hawks at Presbyterian Blue Hose

Quarter	1	2	3	4	Total
Fighting Camels	20	7	7	0	34
Blue Hose	6	0	0	0	6

at Bailey Memorial Stadium • Clinton, SC

- Date: November 10
- Game time: 12:00 p.m. ET
- Game weather: Temperature: 52 °F (11 °C) • Weather: Sunny, clear & cool • Wind: NNW 9
- Game attendance: 2,234
- Referee: Jeffrey Page
- TV: ESPN+

Game information

First Quarter

- (12:09) CAMP – Daniel Smith 4-yard run (Colin Gary kick)
- (10:52) CAMP – Daniel Smith 51-yard run (Colin Gary kick blocked)
- (0:24) PRES – Jordan Morgan 5-yard run (Gardner Duckworth kick blocked)
- (0:11) CAMP – Aaron Blockmon 88-yard kickoff return (Colin Gary kick)

Second Quarter

- (1:54) CAMP – Daniel Smith 45-yard run (Colin Gary kick)

Third Quarter

- (0:54) CAMP – Caleb Snead 36-yard pass from Daniel Smith (Colin Gary kick)

Fourth Quarter

No scoring

Top Passers

- CAMP – Daniel Smith: 14/22, 109 yards, TD
- PRES – John Walker: 3/11, 9 yards, INT

Top Rushers

- CAMP – Daniel Smith: 11 carries, 129 yards, 3 TD
- PRES – Jordan Morgan: 17 carries, 78 yards, TD

Top Receiving

- CAMP – Caleb Snead: 5 receptions, 55 yards, TD
- PRES – Creighton Buchanan: 1 reception, 6 yards

Leading Tacklers

- CAMP – Deontae Henderson: 8 tackles
- PRES – Colby Campbell: 14 tackles

=== At Wofford ===
Presbyterian Blue Hose at Wofford Terriers

Quarter	1	2	3	4	Total
Blue Hose	14	0	0	7	21
No. 13 Terriers	7	21	7	10	45

at Gibbs Stadium • Spartanburg, SC

- Date: November 17
- Game time: 1:30 p.m. ET
- Game weather: Temperature: 58 °F (14 °C) • Weather: Sunny • Wind: SSE at 3
- Game attendance: 5,674
- Referee: Thomas Graham
- TV: ESPN+/WYCW

Game information

First Quarter

- (10:03) PRES – DaShawn Davis 25-yard pass from John Walker (Gardner Duckworth kick)
- (2:50) WOFF – Lennox McAfee 10-yard run (Luke Carter kick)
- (0:08) PRES – DaShawn Davis 21-yard pass from John Walker (Gardner Duckworth kick)

Second Quarter

- (10:52) WOFF – Lennox McAfee 10-yard run (Luke Carter kick)
- (7:06) WOFF – T. J. Luther 40-yard pass from Miller Mosley (Luke Carter kick)
- (6:15) WOFF – Evan Suggs 2-yard run (Luke Carter kick)

Third Quarter

- (13:23) WOFF – Ryan Lovelace 26-yard run (Luke Carter kick)

Fourth Quarter

- (14:47) WOFF – D'mauriae VanCleave 67-yard run (Luke Carter kick)
- (10:20) WOFF – Luke Carter 23-yard field goal
- (4:14) PRES – Zola Davis 6-yard run (Gardner Duckworth kick)

Top Passers

- PRES – John Walker: 13/18, 172 yards, 2 TD, INT
- WOFF – Joe Newman: 7/10, 66 yards, INT

Top Rushers

- PRES – Zola Davis: 14 carries, 64 yards, TD
- WOFF – D'mauriae VanCleave: 6 carries, 91 yards, TD

Top Receiving

- PRES – DaShawn Davis: 5 receptions, 110 yards, 2 TD
- WOFF – T. J. Luther: 2 receptions, 58 yards, TD

Leading Tacklers

- PRES – Jarrett Nagy: 8 tackles
- WOFF – Mason Alstatt: 7 tackles
