= 2018 Lehigh Mountain Hawks football team =

American college football season

2018 Lehigh Mountain Hawks football
- Conference: Patriot League
- Record: 3–8 (2–4 Patriot)
- Head coach: Andy Coen (13th season)
- Offensive coordinator: Scott Brisson (2nd season)
- Defensive coordinator: Craig Sutyak (1st season)
- Home stadium: Goodman Stadium

2018 Patriot League football standings
| | Conf. | | | Overall |
| Team | W | | L | W | | L |
|---|---|---|---|---|---|---|
| No. 8 Colgate $^ | 6 | – | 0 | 10 | – | 2 |
| Holy Cross | 4 | – | 2 | 5 | – | 6 |
| Georgetown | 4 | – | 2 | 5 | – | 6 |
| Lehigh | 2 | – | 4 | 3 | – | 8 |
| Lafayette | 2 | – | 4 | 3 | – | 8 |
| Fordham | 2 | – | 4 | 2 | – | 9 |
| Bucknell | 1 | – | 5 | 1 | – | 10 |
$ – Conference champion; ^ – FCS playoff participant; Rankings from STATS Poll

The 2018 Lehigh Mountain Hawks football team represented Lehigh University in the 2018 NCAA Division I FCS football season. The Mountain Hawks were led by 13th-year head coach Andy Coen and played their home games at Goodman Stadium. They were a member of the Patriot League. They finished the season 3–8, 2–4 in Patriot League play to finish in a three-way tie for fourth place.

== Preseason ==
=== Award watch lists ===
| Award | Player | Position | Year |
|---|---|---|---|
| Walter Payton Award | Dominick Bragalone | RB | SR |
| Walter Payton Award | Brad Mayes | QB | SR |

=== Preseason coaches poll ===
The Patriot League released their preseason coaches poll on July 26, 2018, with the Mountain Hawks predicted to finish in second place.

=== Preseason All-Patriot League team ===
The Mountain Hawks placed three players on the preseason all-Patriot League team.

Offense

Brad Mayes – QB

Dom Bragalone – RB

Chris Fournier – OL

== Schedule ==
| Date | Time | Opponent | Site | TV | Result | Attendance |
|---|---|---|---|---|---|---|
| September 1 | 12:30 p.m. | Saint Francis (PA)* | Goodman Stadium; Bethlehem, PA | Stadium, SE2 | W 21–19 | 4,216 |
| September 8 | 12:30 p.m. | No. 12 Villanova* | Goodman Stadium; Bethlehem, PA | Stadium, SE2 | L 9–31 | 5,104 |
| September 15 | 3:30 p.m. | at Navy* | Navy–Marine Corps Memorial Stadium; Annapolis, MD | CBSSN | L 21–51 | 30,011 |
| September 22 | 3:00 p.m. | at Penn* | Franklin Field; Philadelphia, PA | ESPN+ | L 10–30 | 4,445 |
| October 6 | 1:00 p.m. | at Princeton* | Powers Field at Princeton Stadium; Princeton, NJ | | L 7–66 | 1,013 |
| October 13 | 12:30 p.m. | Fordham | Goodman Stadium; Bethlehem, PA | Stadium, SE2 | L 14–43 | 4115 |
| October 20 | 2:00 p.m. | at Georgetown | Cooper Field; Washington, DC | Stadium | L 16–22 ^{2OT} | 1,871 |
| October 27 | 1:00 p.m. | at Holy Cross | Fitton Field; Worcester, MA | Stadium | L 0–56 | 1,779 |
| November 3 | 12:30 p.m. | Bucknell | Goodman Stadium; Bethlehem, PA | Stadium, SE2 | W 45–17 | 4,203 |
| November 10 | 12:30 p.m. | No. 10 Colgate | Goodman Stadium; Bethlehem, PA | Stadium, SE2 | L 6–48 | 6,633 |
| November 17 | 12:30 p.m. | at Lafayette | Fisher Stadium; Easton, PA (The Rivalry) | Stadium, WFMZ | W 34–3 | 11,028 |
*Non-conference game; Rankings from STATS Poll released prior to the game; All times are in Eastern time

== Game summaries ==
=== Saint Francis (PA) ===
| | 1 | 2 | 3 | 4 | Total |
|---|---|---|---|---|---|
| Red Flash | 7 | 3 | 3 | 6 | 19 |
| Mountain Hawks | 0 | 14 | 7 | 0 | 21 |

=== Villanova ===
| | 1 | 2 | 3 | 4 | Total |
|---|---|---|---|---|---|
| No. 12 Wildcats | 7 | 13 | 11 | 0 | 31 |
| Mountain Hawks | 3 | 0 | 0 | 6 | 9 |

=== At Navy ===
| | 1 | 2 | 3 | 4 | Total |
|---|---|---|---|---|---|
| Mountain Hawks | 7 | 0 | 0 | 14 | 21 |
| Midshipmen | 21 | 13 | 14 | 3 | 51 |

=== At Penn ===
| | 1 | 2 | 3 | 4 | Total |
|---|---|---|---|---|---|
| Mountain Hawks | 0 | 10 | 0 | 0 | 10 |
| Quakers | 0 | 13 | 7 | 10 | 30 |

=== At Princeton ===
| | 1 | 2 | 3 | 4 | Total |
|---|---|---|---|---|---|
| Mountain Hawks | 7 | 0 | 0 | 0 | 7 |
| Tigers | 7 | 24 | 21 | 14 | 66 |

=== Fordham ===
| | 1 | 2 | 3 | 4 | Total |
|---|---|---|---|---|---|
| Rams | 0 | 22 | 7 | 14 | 43 |
| Mountain Hawks | 0 | 6 | 0 | 8 | 14 |

=== At Georgetown ===
| | 1 | 2 | 3 | 4 | OT | 2OT | Total |
|---|---|---|---|---|---|---|---|
| Mountain Hawks | 6 | 0 | 0 | 3 | 7 | 0 | 16 |
| Hoyas | 9 | 0 | 0 | 0 | 7 | 6 | 22 |

=== At Holy Cross ===
| | 1 | 2 | 3 | 4 | Total |
|---|---|---|---|---|---|
| Mountain Hawks | 0 | 0 | 0 | 0 | 0 |
| Crusaders | 7 | 21 | 14 | 14 | 56 |

=== Bucknell ===
| | 1 | 2 | 3 | 4 | Total |
|---|---|---|---|---|---|
| Bisons | 0 | 14 | 3 | 0 | 17 |
| Mountain Hawks | 7 | 14 | 10 | 14 | 45 |

=== Colgate ===
| | 1 | 2 | 3 | 4 | Total |
|---|---|---|---|---|---|
| No. 10 Raiders | 7 | 20 | 21 | 0 | 48 |
| Mountain Hawks | 0 | 6 | 0 | 0 | 6 |

=== At Lafayette ===
| | 1 | 2 | 3 | 4 | Total |
|---|---|---|---|---|---|
| Mountain Hawks | 17 | 0 | 10 | 7 | 34 |
| Leopards | 0 | 3 | 0 | 0 | 3 |
