= 2018 Lafayette Leopards football team =

American college football season

2018 Lafayette Leopards football
- Conference: Patriot League
- Record: 3–8 (2–4 Patriot)
- Head coach: John Garrett (2nd season)
- Offensive coordinator: John Van Dam (1st season)
- Defensive coordinator: Luke Thompson (1st season)
- Home stadium: Fisher Stadium

2018 Patriot League football standings
	Conf.			Overall
Team	W		L	W		L
No. 8 Colgate $^	6	–	0	10	–	2
Holy Cross	4	–	2	5	–	6
Georgetown	4	–	2	5	–	6
Lehigh	2	–	4	3	–	8
Lafayette	2	–	4	3	–	8
Fordham	2	–	4	2	–	9
Bucknell	1	–	5	1	–	10
$ – Conference champion; ^ – FCS playoff participant; Rankings from STATS Poll

The 2018 Lafayette Leopards football team represented Lafayette College as member of the Patriot League during the 2018 NCAA Division I FCS football season. Led by second-year head coach John Garrett, the Leopards compiled an overall record of 3–8 with a mark of 2–4 in conference play, placing in a three-way tie for fourth in the Patriot League. Lafayette played home games at Fisher Field in Easton, Pennsylvania.

== Schedule ==
Date	Time	Opponent	Site	TV	Result	Attendance
September 1	6:00 p.m.	at Sacred Heart*	Campus Field; Fairfield, CT	NECFR	L 6–35	4,157
September 8	3:30 p.m.	at Delaware*	Delaware Stadium; Newark, DE	MASN	L 0–37	12,781
September 15	6:00 p.m.	Monmouth*	Fisher Stadium; Easton, PA	Stadium, WBPH	L 20–24	4,325
September 22	1:00 p.m.	at Colgate	Crown Field at Andy Kerr Stadium; Hamilton, NY	Stadium	L 0–45	7,753
September 29	6:00 p.m.	Central Connecticut*	Fisher Stadium; Easton, PA	Stadium, WBPH	W 31–24	5,295
October 13	3:30 p.m.	Georgetown^{†}	Fisher Stadium; Easton, PA	Stadium, WBPH	L 6–13	4,657
October 20	12:00 p.m.	at Bucknell	Christy Mathewson–Memorial Stadium; Lewisburg, PA	Stadium, WBPH	W 29–27	3,097
October 27	1:00 p.m.	at Fordham	Coffey Field; Bronx, NY	Stadium	W 21–13	3,616
November 3	12:30 p.m.	Holy Cross	Fisher Stadium; Easton, PA	Stadium, WBPH	L 14–40	3,914
November 10	12:00 p.m.	at Army*	Michie Stadium; West Point, NY	CBSSN	L 13–31	31,286
November 17	12:30 p.m.	Lehigh	Fisher Stadium; Easton, PA (The Rivalry)	MASN, Stadium, WBPH	L 3–34	11,028
*Non-conference game; ^{†}Homecoming; All times are in Eastern time

== Preseason ==
=== Preseason coaches poll ===
The Patriot League released their preseason coaches poll on July 26, 2018, with the Leopards predicted to finish in a tie for fifth place.

=== Preseason All-Patriot League team ===
The Leopards placed four players on the preseason all-Patriot League team.

Offense

Will Eisler – FB

Defense

Anthony Giudice – DL

Jerry Powe – LB

Special teams

CJ Amill – RS

== Game summaries ==
=== At Sacred Heart ===
	1	2	3	4	Total
Leopards	3	0	3	0	6
Pioneers	7	14	7	7	35

=== At Delaware ===
	1	2	3	4	Total
Leopards	0	0	0	0	0
Fightin' Blue Hens	14	7	7	9	37

=== Monmouth ===
	1	2	3	4	Total
Hawks	6	9	6	3	24
Leopards	13	7	0	0	20

=== At Colgate ===
	1	2	3	4	Total
Leopards	0	0	0	0	0
Raiders	15	21	9	0	45

=== Central Connecticut ===
	1	2	3	4	Total
Blue Devils	7	10	0	7	24
Leopards	7	7	7	10	31

=== Georgetown ===
	1	2	3	4	Total
Hoyas	0	13	0	0	13
Leopards	0	3	0	3	6

=== At Bucknell ===
	1	2	3	4	Total
Leopards	7	0	13	9	29
Bisons	7	7	7	6	27

=== At Fordham ===
	1	2	3	4	Total
Leopards	0	14	7	0	21
Rams	0	13	0	0	13

=== Holy Cross ===
	1	2	3	4	Total
Crusaders	0	17	23	0	40
Leopards	14	0	0	0	14

=== At Army ===
	1	2	3	4	Total
Leopards	3	3	0	7	13
Black Knights	3	14	14	0	31

=== Lehigh ===
	1	2	3	4	Total
Mountain Hawks	17	0	10	7	34
Leopards	0	3	0	0	3
