= 2018 Fordham Rams football team =

American college football season

2018 Fordham Rams football
- Conference: Patriot League
- Record: 2–9 (2–4 Patriot)
- Head coach: Joe Conlin (1st season)
- Offensive coordinator: Mike Burchett (1st season)
- Co-defensive coordinators: Paul Rice (1st season); Darrell Perkins (1st season)
- Home stadium: Coffey Field

2018 Patriot League football standings
	Conf.			Overall
Team	W		L	W		L
No. 8 Colgate $^	6	–	0	10	–	2
Holy Cross	4	–	2	5	–	6
Georgetown	4	–	2	5	–	6
Lehigh	2	–	4	3	–	8
Lafayette	2	–	4	3	–	8
Fordham	2	–	4	2	–	9
Bucknell	1	–	5	1	–	10
$ – Conference champion; ^ – FCS playoff participant; Rankings from STATS Poll

The 2018 Fordham Rams football team represented Fordham University as a member of the Patriot League during the 2018 NCAA Division I FCS football season. Led by first-year head coach Joe Conlin, the Rams compiled an overall record of 2–9 with a mark of 2–4 in conference play, placing in a three-way tie for fourth in the Patriot League. Fordham played home games at Coffey Field in The Bronx.

== Preseason ==
=== Preseason coaches poll ===
The Patriot League released their preseason coaches poll on July 26, 2018, with the Rams predicted to finish in third place.

=== Preseason All-Patriot League team ===
The Rams placed five players on the preseason all-Patriot League team.

Offense

Austin Longi – WR

Isaiah Searight – TE

Dominic Lombard – OL

Defense

Glenn Cunningham – LB

Dylan Mabin – DB

== Schedule ==
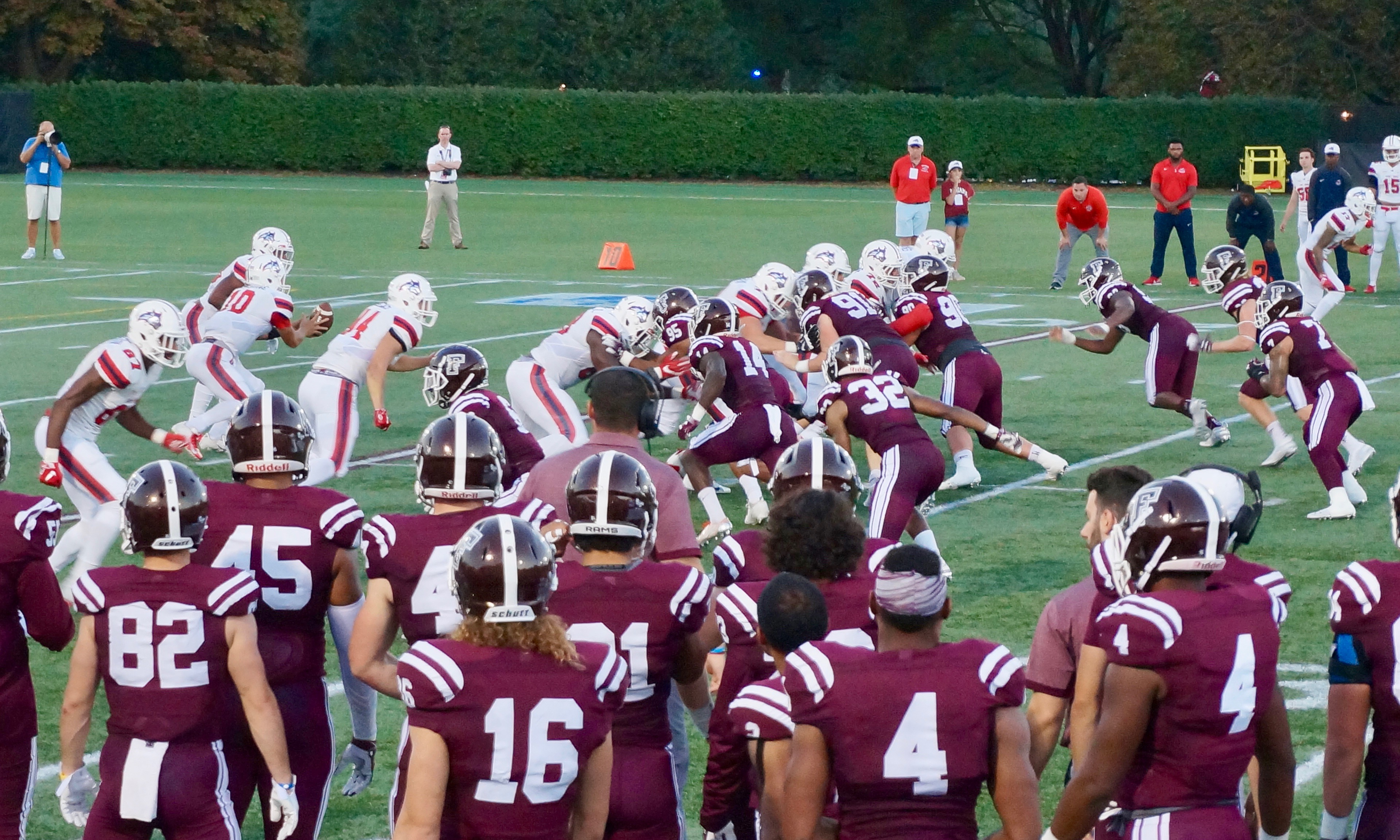
Fordham vs. Stony Brook, on September 15

Date	Time	Opponent	Site	TV	Result	Attendance
September 1	6:00 p.m.	at Charlotte*	Jerry Richardson Stadium; Charlotte, NC	ESPN+	L 10–34	9,240
September 8	6:00 p.m.	at Richmond*	Robins Stadium; Richmond, VA	NBCS WA	L 7–52	8,057
September 15	6:00 p.m.	No. 24 Stony Brook*	Coffey Field; Bronx, NY	Stadium	L 6–28	6,524
September 22	1:00 p.m.	Central Connecticut*^{†}	Coffey Field; Bronx, NY	Stadium	L 13–24	7,134
October 6	1:00 p.m.	Georgetown	Coffey Field; Bronx, NY	Stadium	L 11–23	2,010
October 13	12:30 p.m.	at Lehigh	Goodman Stadium; Bethlehem, PA	Stadium	W 43–14	4,115
October 20	1:00 p.m.	Bryant*	Coffey Field; Bronx, NY	Stadium	L 41–42	1,906
October 27	1:00 p.m.	Lafayette	Coffey Field; Bronx, NY	Stadium	L 13–21	3,616
November 3	1:00 p.m.	No. 12 Colgate	Coffey Field; Bronx, NY	Stadium	L 0–41	2,591
November 10	12:00 p.m.	at Holy Cross	Fitton Field; Worcester, MA (Ram–Crusader Cup)	Stadium	L 13–17	2,988
November 17	12:00 p.m.	at Bucknell	Christy Mathewson–Memorial Stadium; Lewisburg, PA	Stadium	W 17–14	1,126
*Non-conference game; ^{†}Homecoming; Rankings from STATS Poll released prior to the game; All times are in Eastern time

== Game summaries ==
=== At Charlotte ===
	1	2	3	4	Total
Rams	0	7	3	0	10
49ers	3	10	7	14	34

=== At Richmond ===
	1	2	3	4	Total
Rams	0	0	0	7	7
Spiders	7	10	28	7	52

=== Stony Brook ===
	1	2	3	4	Total
No. 24 Seawolves	7	14	7	0	28
Rams	0	0	0	6	6

=== Central Connecticut ===
	1	2	3	4	Total
Blue Devils	10	7	7	0	24
Rams	0	6	7	0	13

=== Georgetown ===
	1	2	3	4	Total
Hoyas	8	0	7	8	23
Rams	0	8	3	0	11

=== At Lehigh ===
	1	2	3	4	Total
Rams	0	22	7	14	43
Mountain Hawks	0	6	0	8	14

=== Bryant ===
	1	2	3	4	Total
Bulldogs	21	0	12	9	42
Rams	3	17	14	7	41

=== Lafayette ===
	1	2	3	4	Total
Leopards	0	14	7	0	21
Rams	0	13	0	0	13

=== Colgate ===
	1	2	3	4	Total
No. 12 Raiders	14	17	0	10	41
Rams	0	0	0	0	0

=== At Holy Cross ===
	1	2	3	4	Total
Rams	7	3	0	3	13
Crusaders	0	0	14	3	17

=== At Bucknell ===
	1	2	3	4	Total
Rams	7	7	3	0	17
Bison	0	7	7	0	14
