= 2018 UC Davis Aggies football team =

American college football season

2018 UC Davis Aggies football
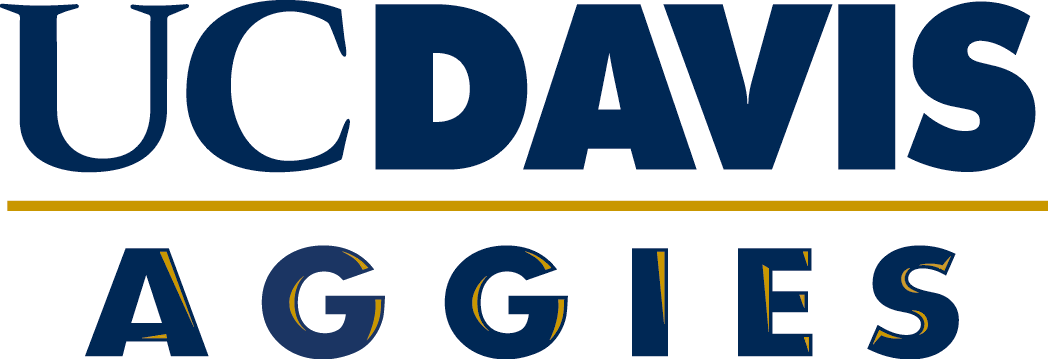

Big Sky co-champion

NCAA Division I Quarterfinal, L 29–34 vs. Eastern Washington
- Conference: Big Sky Conference

Ranking
- STATS: No. 7
- FCS Coaches: No. 8
- Record: 10–3 (7–1 Big Sky)
- Head coach: Dan Hawkins (2nd season)
- Offensive coordinator: Tim Plough (2nd season)
- Defensive coordinator: Robert Tucker (2nd season)
- Home stadium: Aggie Stadium

2018 Big Sky Conference football standings
	Conf.			Overall
Team	W		L	W		L
No. 6 Weber State +^	7	–	1	10	–	3
No. 2 Eastern Washington +^	7	–	1	12	–	3
No. 7 UC Davis +^	7	–	1	10	–	3
No. 17 Montana State ^	5	–	3	8	–	5
Idaho State	5	–	3	6	–	5
Montana	4	–	4	6	–	5
Cal Poly	4	–	4	5	–	6
Northern Arizona	3	–	4	4	–	6
Portland State	3	–	5	4	–	7
Idaho	3	–	5	4	–	7
Northern Colorado	2	–	6	2	–	9
Southern Utah	1	–	7	1	–	10
Sacramento State	0	–	7	2	–	8
$ – Conference champion; ^ – FCS playoff participant; Although North Dakota was classified as an independent, games against them still counted as Big Sky Conference games.; Rankings from STATS Poll

The 2018 UC Davis football team represented the University of California, Davis as a member of the Big Sky Conference during the 2018 NCAA Division I FCS football season. They were led by second-year head coach Dan Hawkins, and played their home games at UC Davis Health Stadium in Davis, California. It was the Aggies 101st season overall and 5th in the Big Sky.

The Aggies compiled an overall record of 10–3 with a mark of 7–1 in conference play, sharing the Big Sky title with Eastern Washington and Weber State.

UC Davis received an at-large bid to the NCAA Division I Football Championship playoffs where, after a first round bye, they defeated Northern Iowa in the second round before losing in the quarterfinals to Eastern Washington.

The Aggies finished 7th in STATS and 8th in FCS Coaches, both new highs for the program and the first time finishing ranked since joining Division I-AA. The Aggies also won their first Big Sky conference title, alongside their first birth in the FCS Playoffs.

== Preseason ==
=== Polls ===
On July 16, 2018, during the Big Sky Kickoff in Spokane, Washington, the Aggies were predicted to finish in ninth place in both the coaches and media poll.

=== Preseason All-Conference Team ===
The Aggies had two players selected to the Preseason All-Conference Team.

Keelan Doss – Sr. WR. Also selected as the preseason offensive player of the year.

Wes Preece – Jr. TE

=== Award watch lists ===
Award	Player	Position	Year
Walter Payton Award	Keelan Doss	WR	SR
Walter Payton Award	Jake Maier	QB	JR

== Schedule ==
Date	Time	Opponent	Rank	Site	TV	Result	Attendance
August 30	7:00 p.m.	at San Jose State*		CEFCU Stadium; San Jose, CA		W 44–38	12,675
September 8	7:00 p.m.	San Diego*		Aggie Stadium; Davis, CA	Pluto TV 245	W 54–21	7,305
September 15	11:00 a.m.	at No. 9 (FBS) Stanford*	No. 23	Stanford Stadium; Stanford, CA	P12N	L 10–30	31,772
September 22	7:00 p.m.	Idaho	No. 21	Aggie Stadium; Davis, CA	ELVN	W 44–21	8,179
October 6	11:00 a.m.	at Northern Colorado	No. 16	Nottingham Field; Greeley, CO	Pluto TV 241	W 49–36	4,155
October 13	4:00 p.m.	Idaho State	No. 14	Aggie Stadium; Davis, CA	Pluto TV 245	W 44–37 ^{OT}	10,849
October 20	4:05 p.m.	at Cal Poly	No. 10	Alex G. Spanos Stadium; San Luis Obispo, CA (Battle for the Golden Horseshoe)	Pluto TV 244	W 52–10	8,503
October 27	1:00 p.m.	at Montana	No. 6	Washington–Grizzly Stadium; Missoula, MT	SWX	W 49–21	24,141
November 3	1:00 p.m.	Northern Arizona	No. 6	Aggie Stadium; Davis, CA	Pluto TV 245	W 42–20	7,890
November 10	1:05 p.m.	at No. 5 Eastern Washington	No. 4	Roos Field; Cheney, WA	SWX	L 20–59	8,789
November 17	1:00 p.m.	vs. Sacramento State	No. 9	Mackay Stadium (Note: The game against Sacramento State on November 17 was moved to Mackay Stadium in Reno, Nevada due to unhealthy air quality as a result of the Camp Fire in Northern California.); Reno, NV (Causeway Classic)	ELVN	W 56–13	2,482
December 1	4:00 p.m.	Northern Iowa*	No. 7	Aggie Stadium; Davis, CA (NCAA Division I Second Round)	ESPN3	W 23–16	8,306
December 8	1:00 p.m.	at No. 4 Eastern Washington*	No. 7	Roos Field; Cheney, WA (NCAA Division I Quarterfinal)	ESPN3	L 29–34	5,503
*Non-conference game; Rankings from STATS Poll released prior to the game; All times are in Pacific time

== Game summaries ==
=== At San Jose State ===
	1	2	3	4	Total
Aggies	14	21	2	7	44
Spartans	14	7	10	7	38

=== San Diego ===
	1	2	3	4	Total
Toreros	0	0	21	0	21
Aggies	7	13	7	27	54

=== At Stanford ===
	1	2	3	4	Total
No. 23 Aggies	3	0	0	7	10
No. 9 (FBS) Cardinal	0	17	10	3	30

=== Idaho ===
	1	2	3	4	Total
Vandals	0	7	0	14	21
No. 21 Aggies	14	13	17	0	44

=== At Northern Colorado ===
	1	2	3	4	Total
No. 16 Aggies	14	14	14	7	49
Bears	0	10	0	26	36

=== Idaho State ===
	1	2	3	4	OT	Total
Bengals	9	14	7	7	0	37
No. 14 Aggies	7	7	8	15	7	44

=== At Cal Poly ===
	1	2	3	4	Total
No. 10 Aggies	0	31	7	14	52
Mustangs	10	0	0	0	10

=== At Montana ===
	1	2	3	4	Total
No. 6 Aggies	3	0	10	36	49
Grizzlies	7	14	0	0	21

=== Northern Arizona ===
	1	2	3	4	Total
Lumberjacks	0	6	0	14	20
No. 6 Aggies	21	0	7	14	42

=== At Eastern Washington ===
	1	2	3	4	Total
No. 4 Aggies	10	7	3	0	20
No. 5 Eagles	7	14	14	24	59

=== Vs. Sacramento State ===
	1	2	3	4	Total
Hornets	3	7	3	0	13
No. 9 Aggies	14	21	7	14	56

== FCS Playoffs ==
=== Vs. Northern Iowa–Second Round ===
	1	2	3	4	Total
Panthers	6	0	7	3	16
No. 7 Aggies	10	6	7	0	23

=== At Eastern Washington–Quarterfinals ===
	1	2	3	4	Total
No. 7 Aggies	0	14	7	8	29
No. 4 Eagles	7	7	0	20	34

== Ranking movements ==
Ranking movements Legend: ██ Increase in ranking ██ Decrease in ranking — = Not ranked RV = Received votes
	Week													
Poll	Pre	1	2	3	4	5	6	7	8	9	10	11	12	Final
STATS FCS	RV	RV	23	21	19	16	14	10	6	6	4	9	7	7
Coaches	—	RV	RV	25	22	21	19	16	13	9	7	11	7	8
