= 2018 Montana State Bobcats football team =

American college football season

2018 Montana State Bobcats football
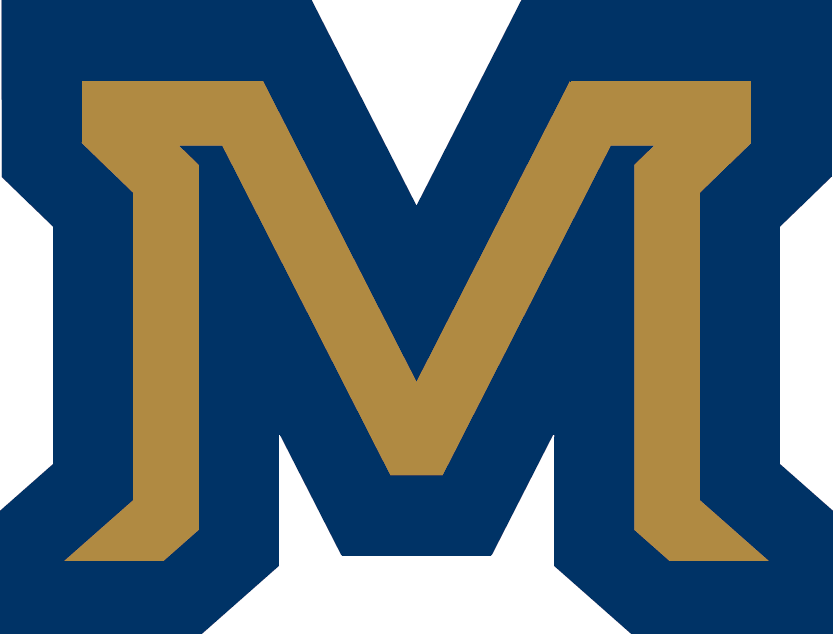

NCAA Division I Second Round, L 10–52 vs. North Dakota State
- Conference: Big Sky Conference

Ranking
- STATS: No. 17
- FCS Coaches: No. 17
- Record: 8–5 (5–3 Big Sky)
- Head coach: Jeff Choate (3rd season)
- Offensive coordinator: Brian Armstrong (1st season; first 7 games); Matt Miller (1st season; remainder of season)
- Offensive scheme: Multiple
- Defensive coordinator: Ty Gregorak (3rd season)
- Base defense: 4–3
- Home stadium: Bobcat Stadium

2018 Big Sky Conference football standings
	Conf.			Overall
Team	W		L	W		L
No. 6 Weber State +^	7	–	1	10	–	3
No. 2 Eastern Washington +^	7	–	1	12	–	3
No. 7 UC Davis +^	7	–	1	10	–	3
No. 17 Montana State ^	5	–	3	8	–	5
Idaho State	5	–	3	6	–	5
Montana	4	–	4	6	–	5
Cal Poly	4	–	4	5	–	6
Northern Arizona	3	–	4	4	–	6
Portland State	3	–	5	4	–	7
Idaho	3	–	5	4	–	7
Northern Colorado	2	–	6	2	–	9
Southern Utah	1	–	7	1	–	10
Sacramento State	0	–	7	2	–	8
$ – Conference champion; ^ – FCS playoff participant; Although North Dakota was classified as an independent, games against them still counted as Big Sky Conference games.; Rankings from STATS Poll

The 2018 Montana State Bobcats football team represented Montana State University as a member of the Big Sky Conference during the 2018 NCAA Division I FCS football season. Led by third-year head coach Jeff Choate, the Bobcats compiled an overall record of 8–5 with a mark of 5–3 in conference play, tying for fourth place in the Big Sky. Montana State received an at-large bid to the NCAA Division I Football Championship playoffs, where they defeated Incarnate Word in the first round before losing to the eventual national champion, North Dakota State, in the second round. The Bobcats played their home games at Bobcat Stadium in Bozeman, Montana.

== Preseason ==
=== Polls ===
On July 16, 2018, during the Big Sky Kickoff in Spokane, Washington, the Bobcats were predicted to finish in eighth place in both the coaches and media poll.

=== Preseason All-Conference Team ===
The Bobcats had one player selected to the Preseason All-Conference Team.

Tucker Yates – Sr. DT

== Schedule ==
Date	Time	Opponent	Rank	Site	TV	Result	Attendance
August 30	7:00 p.m.	Western Illinois*		Bobcat Stadium; Bozeman, MT	SWX	W 26–23	18,507
September 8	5:00 p.m.	at No. 3 South Dakota State*		Dana J. Dykhouse Stadium; Brookings, SD	SWX	L 14–45	14,614
September 15	1:00 p.m.	Wagner*		Bobcat Stadium; Bozeman, MT	SWX	W 47–24	18,037
September 22	3:00 p.m.	at Portland State		Hillsboro Stadium; Hillsboro, OR	SWX	W 43–23	4,135
September 29	1:00 p.m.	No. 5 Eastern Washington		Bobcat Stadium; Bozeman, MT	RTNW	L 17–34	18,667
October 13	2:00 p.m.	Idaho^{†}		Bobcat Stadium; Bozeman, MT	RTNW	W 24–23	19,177
October 20	4:00 p.m.	at No. 7 Weber State		Stewart Stadium; Ogden, UT	RTNW	L 24–34	8,062
October 27	3:30 p.m.	at Idaho State		Holt Arena; Pocatello, ID	ELVN	L 17–24	8,851
November 3	2:00 p.m.	Cal Poly		Bobcat Stadium; Bozeman, MT	SWX	W 49–42	16,747
November 10	1:00 p.m.	Northern Colorado		Bobcat Stadium; Bozeman, MT	RTNW	W 35–7	14,147
November 17	12:00 p.m.	at Montana	No. 25	Washington–Grizzly Stadium; Missoula, MT (rivalry)	RTNW	W 29–25	26,508
November 24	1:00 p.m.	No. 24 Incarnate Word*	No. 23	Bobcat Stadium; Bozeman, MT (NCAA Division I First Round)	ESPN3	W 35–14	10,017
December 1	2:00 p.m.	at No. 1 North Dakota State*	No. 23	Fargodome; Fargo, ND (NCAA Division I Second Round)	ESPN3	L 10–52	17,007
*Non-conference game; ^{†}Homecoming; Rankings from STATS Poll released prior to the game; All times are in Mountain time

== Game summaries ==
=== Western Illinois ===
	1	2	3	4	Total
Leathernecks	7	6	7	3	23
Bobcats	3	3	14	6	26

=== At South Dakota State ===
	1	2	3	4	Total
Bobcats	0	0	8	6	14
No. 3 Jackrabbits	7	17	14	7	45

=== Wagner ===
	1	2	3	4	Total
Seahawks	7	14	3	0	24
Bobcats	14	16	10	7	47

=== At Portland State ===
	1	2	3	4	Total
Bobcats	6	20	17	0	43
Vikings	3	13	7	0	23

=== Eastern Washington ===
	1	2	3	4	Total
No. 5 Eagles	14	10	3	7	34
Bobcats	10	0	0	7	17

=== Idaho ===
	1	2	3	4	Total
Vandals	7	7	3	6	23
Bobcats	7	0	14	3	24

=== At Weber State ===
	1	2	3	4	Total
Bobcats	7	10	7	0	24
No. 7 Wildcats	0	14	10	10	34

=== At Idaho State ===
	1	2	3	4	Total
Bobcats	7	0	0	10	17
Bengals	0	17	7	0	24

=== Cal Poly ===
	1	2	3	4	Total
Mustangs	7	7	7	21	42
Bobcats	14	14	14	7	49

=== Northern Colorado ===
	1	2	3	4	Total
Bears	7	0	0	0	7
Bobcats	7	14	0	14	35

=== At Montana ===
#25 Montana State Bobcats (6–4) at Montana Grizzlies (6–4)

Quarter	1	2	3	4	Total
Montana St	0	7	0	22	29
Montana	7	15	0	3	25

at Washington–Grizzly Stadium, Missoula, Montana

- Date: November 17, 2018
- Game time: 12:00 p.m.
- Game weather: Sunny, 30 °F (−1 °C)
- Game attendance: 26,508
- Box Score

Game information

First quarter

- UM – Gabe Sulser 1-yard pass from Dalton Sneed (Tim Semenza kick), 12:31. Montana 7–0. Drive: 6 plays, 73 yards, 2:29.

Second quarter

- UM – Adam Eastwood 1-yard run (Tim Semenza kick), 13:30. Montana 14–0. Drive: 10 plays, 58 yards, 3:41.
- UM – Samuel Akem 37-yard pass from Dalton Sneed (run good), 8:15. Montana 22–0. Drive: 2 plays, 39 yards, 0:40.
- MSU – Troy Andersen 3-yard run (Tristan Bailey kick), 0:23. Montana 22–7. Drive: 10 plays, 72 yards, 2:43.

Third quarter

- No scoring

Fourth quarter

- MSU – Troy Andersen 1-yard run (run good), 14:24. Montana 22–15. Drive: 9 plays, 87 yards, 3:15.
- UM – Tim Semenza 34-yard field goal, 7:46. Montana 25–15. Drive: 14 plays, 58 yards, 6:32.
- MSU – Troy Andersen 1-yard run (Tristan Bailey kick), 6:01. Montana 25–22. Drive: 7 plays, 75 yards, 1:45.
- MSU – Logan Jones 13-yard run (Tristan Bailey kick), 2:19. Montana St 29–25. Drive: 7 plays, 35 yards, 2:57.

Top passers

- MSU – Troy Andersen – 15/24, 158 yards
- UM – Dalton Sneed – 22/34, 354 yards, 2 TD

Top rushers

- MSU – Troy Andersen – 23 rushes, 107 yards, 3 TD
- UM – Jerry Louie-McGee – 4 rushes, 43 yards

Top receivers

- MSU – Travis Jonsen – 11 receptions, 101 yards
- UM – Samuel Akem – 6 receptions, 147 yards, TD

== FCS Playoffs ==
=== Incarnate Word–First Round ===
	1	2	3	4	Total
No. 24 Cardinals	7	0	7	0	14
No. 23 Bobcats	7	11	3	14	35

=== At North Dakota State–Second Round ===
	1	2	3	4	Total
No. 23 Bobcats	3	0	7	0	10
No. 1 Bison	21	17	7	7	52

== Ranking movements ==
Ranking movements Legend: ██ Increase in ranking ██ Decrease in ranking — = Not ranked RV = Received votes
	Week													
Poll	Pre	1	2	3	4	5	6	7	8	9	10	11	12	Final
STATS FCS	RV	RV	RV	RV	RV	RV	RV	RV	RV	RV	RV	25	23	17
Coaches	—	RV	RV	RV	RV	RV	RV	RV	RV	—	RV	RV	23	17
