= 2018 Sacramento State Hornets football team =

American college football season

2018 Sacramento State Hornets football
- Conference: Big Sky Conference
- Record: 2–8 (0–7 Big Sky)
- Head coach: Jody Sears (5th season)
- Co-offensive coordinators: Luke Huard (2nd season); Paul Wulff (3rd season)
- Defensive coordinator: Sammy Lawanson (3rd season)
- Home stadium: Hornet Stadium

2018 Big Sky Conference football standings
	Conf.			Overall
Team	W		L	W		L
No. 6 Weber State +^	7	–	1	10	–	3
No. 2 Eastern Washington +^	7	–	1	12	–	3
No. 7 UC Davis +^	7	–	1	10	–	3
No. 17 Montana State ^	5	–	3	8	–	5
Idaho State	5	–	3	6	–	5
Montana	4	–	4	6	–	5
Cal Poly	4	–	4	5	–	6
Northern Arizona	3	–	4	4	–	6
Portland State	3	–	5	4	–	7
Idaho	3	–	5	4	–	7
Northern Colorado	2	–	6	2	–	9
Southern Utah	1	–	7	1	–	10
Sacramento State	0	–	7	2	–	8
$ – Conference champion; ^ – FCS playoff participant; Although North Dakota was classified as an independent, games against them still counted as Big Sky Conference games.; Rankings from STATS Poll

The 2018 Sacramento State Hornets football team represented California State University, Sacramento as a member of the Big Sky Conference during the 2018 NCAA Division I FCS football season. Led by Jody Sears in his fifth and final season as head coach, Sacramento State compiled an overall record of 2–8 with a mark of 0–7 in conference play, placing last out of 13 teams in the Big Sky. The Hornets played home games at Hornet Stadium in Sacramento, California.

On November 26, Sears was fired. He finished his tenure at Sacramento State with a record of 20–35.

== Preseason ==
=== Big Sky Kickoff ===
On July 16, 2018, during the Big Sky Kickoff in Spokane, Washington, the Hornets were predicted to finish in fifth place in the coaches poll and seventh place in the media poll.

=== Preseason All-Conference Team ===
The Hornets had three players selected to the Preseason All-Conference Team.

Andre Lindsey – Sr. WR

George Obinna – Sr. DE

Mister Harriel – Sr. S

== Schedule ==
Date	Time	Opponent	Site	TV	Result	Attendance
September 1	6:00 p.m.	St. Francis (IL)*	Hornet Stadium; Sacramento, CA	CW 31	W 55–7	6,944
September 8	6:00 p.m.	at San Diego State*	SDCCU Stadium; San Diego, CA		L 14–28	45,755
September 15	1:00 p.m.	at Northern Colorado*	Nottingham Field; Greeley, CO	ELVN	W 28–25	3,768
September 22	12:00 p.m.	at No. 19 Montana	Washington–Grizzly Stadium; Missoula, MT	RTNW	L 34–41	24,060
October 6	6:00 p.m.	Cal Poly	Hornet Stadium; Sacramento, CA	CW 31	L 27–41	8,930
October 13	5:00 p.m.	at Southern Utah	Eccles Coliseum; Cedar City, UT	Pluto TV 236	L 27–48	10,424
October 20	6:00 p.m.	North Dakota^{†}	Hornet Stadium; Sacramento, CA	CW 31	L 15–41	10,709
October 27	6:00 p.m.	Portland State	Hornet Stadium; Sacramento, CA	CW 31	L 14–41	3,267
November 3	11:00 a.m.	at No. 4 Weber State	Stewart Stadium; Ogden, UT	Pluto TV 235	L 14–26	7,857
November 10	6:00 p.m.	Northern Arizona	Hornet Stadium; Sacramento, CA	CW 31	Cancelled (Note: The game against Northern Arizona on November 10 was cancelled due to unhealthy air quality as a result of the Camp Fire in Northern California.)	
November 17	1:00 p.m.	vs. No. 9 UC Davis	Mackay Stadium (Note: The game against UC Davis on November 17 was moved to Mackay Stadium in Reno, Nevada due to unhealthy air quality as a result of the Camp Fire in Northern California.); Reno, NV (Causeway Classic)	ELVN	L 13–56	2,482
*Non-conference game; ^{†}Homecoming; Rankings from STATS Poll released prior to the game; All times are in Pacific time

Despite Northern Colorado also being a member of the Big Sky Conference, the September 15 game against Sacramento State was considered a non-conference game.

== Game summaries ==
=== St. Francis (IL) ===
	1	2	3	4	Total
Fighting Saints	0	0	7	0	7
Hornets	10	21	14	10	55

=== At San Diego State ===
	1	2	3	4	Total
Hornets	0	7	7	0	14
Aztecs	7	6	0	15	28

=== At Northern Colorado ===
	1	2	3	4	Total
Hornets	7	0	7	14	28
Bears	7	7	3	8	25

=== At Montana ===
	1	2	3	4	Total
Hornets	14	14	3	3	34
No. 19 Grizzlies	14	10	7	10	41

=== Cal Poly ===
	1	2	3	4	Total
Mustangs	14	7	6	14	41
Hornets	14	0	3	10	27

=== At Southern Utah ===
	1	2	3	4	Total
Hornets	21	3	0	3	27
Thunderbirds	7	20	14	7	48

=== North Dakota ===
	1	2	3	4	Total
Fighting Hawks	14	0	20	7	41
Hornets	3	7	5	0	15

=== Portland State ===
	1	2	3	4	Total
Vikings	3	21	3	14	41
Hornets	0	7	0	7	14

=== At Weber State ===
	1	2	3	4	Total
Hornets	0	0	7	7	14
No. 4 Wildcats	3	10	13	0	26

=== At UC Davis ===
	1	2	3	4	Total
Hornets	3	7	3	0	13
No. 9 Aggies	14	21	7	14	56
