= 2018 Portland State Vikings football team =

American college football season

2018 Portland State Vikings football
- Conference: Big Sky Conference
- Record: 4–7 (3–5 Big Sky)
- Head coach: Bruce Barnum (4th season)
- Offensive coordinator: Matt Leunen (1st season)
- Offensive scheme: Pro spread
- Defensive coordinator: Payam Saadat (1st season)
- Base defense: 3–3–5
- Home stadium: Hillsboro Stadium; Providence Park

2018 Big Sky Conference football standings
	Conf.			Overall
Team	W		L	W		L
No. 6 Weber State +^	7	–	1	10	–	3
No. 2 Eastern Washington +^	7	–	1	12	–	3
No. 7 UC Davis +^	7	–	1	10	–	3
No. 17 Montana State ^	5	–	3	8	–	5
Idaho State	5	–	3	6	–	5
Montana	4	–	4	6	–	5
Cal Poly	4	–	4	5	–	6
Northern Arizona	3	–	4	4	–	6
Portland State	3	–	5	4	–	7
Idaho	3	–	5	4	–	7
Northern Colorado	2	–	6	2	–	9
Southern Utah	1	–	7	1	–	10
Sacramento State	0	–	7	2	–	8
$ – Conference champion; ^ – FCS playoff participant; Although North Dakota was classified as an independent, games against them still counted as Big Sky Conference games.; Rankings from STATS Poll

The 2018 Portland State Vikings football team represented Portland State University during the 2018 NCAA Division I FCS football season. They were led by fourth-year head coach Bruce Barnum and played their home games at Hillsboro Stadium and Providence Park. They were a member of the Big Sky Conference. They finished the season 4–7, 3–5 in Big Sky play to finish in a tie for ninth place.

== Preseason ==
=== Polls ===
On July 16, 2018, during the Big Sky Kickoff in Spokane, Washington, the Vikings were predicted to finish in last place in both the coaches and media poll.

=== Preseason All-Conference Team ===
The Vikings had one player selected to the Preseason All-Conference Team.

Charlie Taumoepeau – Jr. TE

== Schedule ==
Date	Time	Opponent	Site	TV	Result	Attendance
August 31	6:00 p.m.	at Nevada*	Mackay Stadium; Reno, NV		L 19–72	17,525
September 8	11:00 a.m.	at No. 23 (FBS) Oregon*	Autzen Stadium; Eugene, OR	P12N	L 14–62	47,210
September 15	2:00 p.m.	College of Idaho*	Hillsboro Stadium; Hillsboro, OR	Pluto TV 232	W 63–14	2,354
September 22	2:00 p.m.	Montana State	Hillsboro Stadium; Hillsboro, OR	Pluto TV 232	L 23–43	4,135
September 29	2:00 p.m.	at Idaho	Kibbie Dome; Moscow, ID	Pluto TV 242	L 7–20	10,566
October 6	1:00 p.m.	at No. 14 Montana	Washington–Grizzly Stadium; Missoula, MT	Pluto TV 237	W 22–20	25,205
October 13	2:00 p.m.	Northern Colorado	Providence Park; Portland, OR	Pluto TV 232	W 35–14	4,375
October 27	6:00 p.m.	at Sacramento State	Hornet Stadium; Sacramento, CA	Pluto TV 233	W 41–14	3,267
November 3	2:00 p.m.	Idaho State	Hillsboro Stadium; Hillsboro, OR	ELVN	L 45–48	3,924
November 10	12:00 p.m.	at North Dakota	Alerus Center; Grand Forks, ND	Pluto TV 240	L 10–17	7,494
November 16	7:00 p.m.	No. 4 Eastern Washington	Hillsboro Stadium; Hillsboro, OR (The Dam Cup)	Pluto TV 232	L 23–74	4,205
*Non-conference game; Rankings from STATS Poll released prior to the game; All times are in Pacific time

== Game summaries ==
=== At Nevada ===
	1	2	3	4	Total
Vikings	9	10	0	0	19
Wolf Pack	9	21	28	14	72

=== At Oregon ===
	1	2	3	4	Total
Vikings	0	7	0	7	14
No. 23 (FBS) Ducks	14	21	14	13	62

=== College of Idaho ===
	1	2	3	4	Total
Coyotes	7	7	0	0	14
Vikings	28	21	0	14	63

=== Montana State ===
	1	2	3	4	Total
Bobcats	6	20	17	0	43
Vikings	3	13	7	0	23

=== At Idaho ===
	1	2	3	4	Total
Vikings	0	0	7	0	7
Vandals	3	17	0	0	20

=== At Montana ===
	1	2	3	4	Total
Vikings	10	3	0	9	22
No. 14 Grizzlies	0	0	14	6	20

=== Northern Colorado ===
	1	2	3	4	Total
Bears	0	0	0	14	14
Vikings	14	14	7	0	35

=== At Sacramento State ===
	1	2	3	4	Total
Vikings	3	21	3	14	41
Hornets	0	7	0	7	14

=== Idaho State ===
	1	2	3	4	Total
Bengals	14	17	10	7	48
Vikings	3	21	14	7	45

=== At North Dakota ===
	1	2	3	4	Total
Vikings	0	3	7	0	10
Fighting Hawks	7	0	0	10	17

=== Eastern Washington–The Dam Cup ===
	1	2	3	4	Total
No. 4 Eagles	14	13	27	20	74
Vikings	0	14	7	2	23
