= 2018 Eastern Washington Eagles football team =

American college football season

2018 Eastern Washington Eagles football
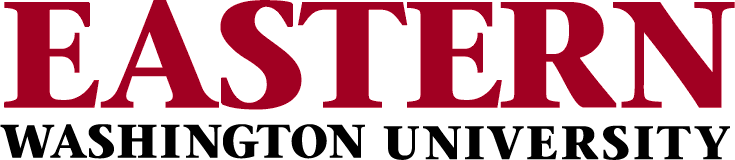

Big Sky co-champion

NCAA Division I Championship Game, L 24–38 vs. North Dakota State
- Conference: Big Sky Conference

Ranking
- STATS: No. 2
- FCS Coaches: No. 2
- Record: 12–3 (7–1 Big Sky)
- Head coach: Aaron Best (2nd season)
- Offensive coordinator: Bodie Reeder (2nd season)
- Offensive scheme: Multiple
- Defensive coordinator: Jeff Schmedding (4th season)
- Base defense: 4–2–5
- Home stadium: Roos Field

2018 Big Sky Conference football standings
| | Conf. | | | Overall |
| Team | W | | L | W | | L |
|---|---|---|---|---|---|---|
| No. 6 Weber State +^ | 7 | – | 1 | 10 | – | 3 |
| No. 2 Eastern Washington +^ | 7 | – | 1 | 12 | – | 3 |
| No. 7 UC Davis +^ | 7 | – | 1 | 10 | – | 3 |
| No. 17 Montana State ^ | 5 | – | 3 | 8 | – | 5 |
| Idaho State | 5 | – | 3 | 6 | – | 5 |
| Montana | 4 | – | 4 | 6 | – | 5 |
| Cal Poly | 4 | – | 4 | 5 | – | 6 |
| Northern Arizona | 3 | – | 4 | 4 | – | 6 |
| Portland State | 3 | – | 5 | 4 | – | 7 |
| Idaho | 3 | – | 5 | 4 | – | 7 |
| Northern Colorado | 2 | – | 6 | 2 | – | 9 |
| Southern Utah | 1 | – | 7 | 1 | – | 10 |
| Sacramento State | 0 | – | 7 | 2 | – | 8 |
$ – Conference champion; ^ – FCS playoff participant; Although North Dakota was classified as an independent, games against them still counted as Big Sky Conference games.; Rankings from STATS Poll

The 2018 Eastern Washington Eagles football team represented Eastern Washington University in the 2018 NCAA Division I FCS football season. The team was coached by second year head coach Aaron Best. The Eagles played their home games at Roos Field in Cheney, Washington and were a member of the Big Sky Conference. They finished the season 12–3, 7–1 in Big Sky play to finish in a three-way tie for the Big Sky championship with UC Davis and Weber State. They received an at-large bid to the FCS playoffs, where they defeated Nicholls, UC Davis, and Maine to advance to the National Championship Game, where they lost to North Dakota State.

== Preseason ==
=== Polls ===
On July 16, 2018, during the Big Sky Kickoff in Spokane, Washington, the Eagles were predicted to win the Big Sky by both the coaches and media.

=== Preseason All-Conference Team ===
The Eagles had three players selected to the Preseason All-Conference Team.

Gage Gubrud – Sr. QB

Antoine Custer – Jr. RB

Jay-Tee Tiuli – Sr. DT

=== Award watch lists ===
| Award | Player | Position | Year |
|---|---|---|---|
| Walter Payton Award | Gage Gubrud | QB | SR |

== Schedule ==
| Date | Time | Opponent | Rank | Site | TV | Result | Attendance |
|---|---|---|---|---|---|---|---|
| September 1 | 1:05 p.m. | Central Washington* | No. 9 | Roos Field; Cheney, WA | SWX | W 58–13 | 8,658 |
| September 8 | 3:05 p.m. | at No. 18 Northern Arizona* | No. 6 | Walkup Skydome; Flagstaff, AZ | SWX | W 31–26 | 8,938 |
| September 15 | 5:05 p.m. | at Washington State* | No. 6 | Martin Stadium; Pullman, WA | P12N | L 24–59 | 32,952 |
| September 22 | 1:05 p.m. | Cal Poly | No. 6 | Roos Field; Cheney, WA | SWX | W 70–17 | 9,156 |
| September 29 | 1:05 p.m. | at Montana State | No. 5 | Bobcat Stadium; Bozeman, MT | RTNW | W 34–17 | 18,667 |
| October 6 | 12:05 p.m. | Southern Utah | No. 5 | Roos Field; Cheney, WA | RTNW | W 55–17 | 8,887 |
| October 13 | 3:05 p.m. | at No. 13 Weber State | No. 4 | Stewart Stadium; Ogden, Utah | ELVN | L 6–14 | 8,211 |
| October 27 | 12:05 p.m. | Idaho^{†} | No. 5 | Roos Field; Cheney, WA | RTNW | W 38–14 | 10,023 |
| November 3 | 11:05 a.m. | at Northern Colorado | No. 5 | Nottingham Field; Greeley, CO | Pluto TV 241 | W 48–13 | 3,274 |
| November 10 | 1:05 p.m. | No. 4 UC Davis | No. 5 | Roos Field; Cheney, WA | SWX | W 59–20 | 8,789 |
| November 16 | 7:05 p.m. | at Portland State | No. 4 | Hillsboro Stadium; Hillsboro, OR (The Dam Cup) | Pluto TV 232 | W 74–23 | 4,205 |
| December 1 | 2:00 p.m. | No. 14 Nicholls* | No. 4 | Roos Field; Cheney, WA (NCAA Division I Second Round) | ESPN3 | W 42–21 | 5,250 |
| December 8 | 1:00 p.m. | No. 7 UC Davis* | No. 4 | Roos Field; Cheney, WA (NCAA Division I Quarterfinal) | ESPN3 | W 34–29 | 5,503 |
| December 15 | 11:00 a.m. | No. 12 Maine* | No. 4 | Roos Field; Cheney, WA (NCAA Division I Semifinal) | ESPN2 | W 50–19 | 7,529 |
| January 5 | 9:00 a.m. | vs. No. 1 North Dakota State* | No. 4 | Toyota Stadium; Frisco, TX (NCAA Division I Championship Game) | ESPN2 | L 24–38 | 17,802 |
*Non-conference game; ^{†}Homecoming; Rankings from STATS Poll released prior to the game; All times are in Pacific time

Despite also being a member of the Big Sky, the game vs. Northern Arizona was counted as a non-conference game and had no effect on the Big Sky standings.

== Game summaries ==
=== Central Washington ===
| | 1 | 2 | 3 | 4 | Total |
|---|---|---|---|---|---|
| Wildcats | 0 | 13 | 0 | 0 | 13 |
| No. 9 Eagles | 20 | 14 | 10 | 14 | 58 |

=== At Northern Arizona ===
| | 1 | 2 | 3 | 4 | Total |
|---|---|---|---|---|---|
| No. 6 Eagles | 14 | 7 | 7 | 3 | 31 |
| No. 18 Lumberjacks | 0 | 10 | 3 | 13 | 26 |

=== At Washington State ===
| | 1 | 2 | 3 | 4 | Total |
|---|---|---|---|---|---|
| No. 6 Eagles | 0 | 10 | 14 | 0 | 24 |
| Cougars | 14 | 14 | 7 | 24 | 59 |

=== Cal Poly ===
| | 1 | 2 | 3 | 4 | Total |
|---|---|---|---|---|---|
| Mustangs | 3 | 7 | 7 | 0 | 17 |
| No. 6 Eagles | 14 | 21 | 14 | 21 | 70 |

=== At Montana State ===
| | 1 | 2 | 3 | 4 | Total |
|---|---|---|---|---|---|
| No. 5 Eagles | 14 | 10 | 3 | 7 | 34 |
| Bobcats | 10 | 0 | 0 | 7 | 17 |

=== Southern Utah ===
| | 1 | 2 | 3 | 4 | Total |
|---|---|---|---|---|---|
| Thunderbirds | 3 | 7 | 7 | 0 | 17 |
| No. 5 Eagles | 14 | 20 | 21 | 0 | 55 |

=== At Weber State ===
| | 1 | 2 | 3 | 4 | Total |
|---|---|---|---|---|---|
| No. 4 Eagles | 0 | 3 | 3 | 0 | 6 |
| No. 13 Wildcats | 14 | 0 | 0 | 0 | 14 |

=== Idaho ===
| | 1 | 2 | 3 | 4 | Total |
|---|---|---|---|---|---|
| Vandals | 0 | 0 | 7 | 7 | 14 |
| No. 5 Eagles | 14 | 17 | 7 | 0 | 38 |

=== At Northern Colorado ===
| | 1 | 2 | 3 | 4 | Total |
|---|---|---|---|---|---|
| No. 5 Eagles | 13 | 7 | 14 | 14 | 48 |
| Bears | 0 | 0 | 13 | 0 | 13 |

=== UC Davis ===
| | 1 | 2 | 3 | 4 | Total |
|---|---|---|---|---|---|
| No. 4 Aggies | 10 | 7 | 3 | 0 | 20 |
| No. 5 Eagles | 7 | 14 | 14 | 24 | 59 |

=== At Portland State ===
| | 1 | 2 | 3 | 4 | Total |
|---|---|---|---|---|---|
| No. 4 Eagles | 14 | 13 | 27 | 20 | 74 |
| Vikings | 0 | 14 | 7 | 2 | 23 |

== FCS Playoffs ==
=== Nicholls–Second Round ===
| | 1 | 2 | 3 | 4 | Total |
|---|---|---|---|---|---|
| No. 14 Colonels | 7 | 7 | 0 | 7 | 21 |
| No. 4 Eagles | 3 | 7 | 10 | 22 | 42 |

=== UC Davis–Quarterfinals ===
| | 1 | 2 | 3 | 4 | Total |
|---|---|---|---|---|---|
| No. 7 Aggies | 0 | 14 | 7 | 8 | 29 |
| No. 4 Eagles | 7 | 7 | 0 | 20 | 34 |

=== Maine–Semifinals ===
| | 1 | 2 | 3 | 4 | Total |
|---|---|---|---|---|---|
| No. 12 Black Bears | 0 | 0 | 19 | 0 | 19 |
| No. 4 Eagles | 21 | 7 | 15 | 7 | 50 |

=== North Dakota State–Championship ===
| | 1 | 2 | 3 | 4 | Total |
|---|---|---|---|---|---|
| No. 4 Eagles | 0 | 10 | 7 | 7 | 24 |
| No. 1 Bison | 10 | 7 | 14 | 7 | 38 |

== Ranking movements ==
Ranking movements Legend: ██ Increase in ranking ██ Decrease in ranking т = Tied with team above or below
| | Week | | | | | | | | | | | | | |
| Poll | Pre | 1 | 2 | 3 | 4 | 5 | 6 | 7 | 8 | 9 | 10 | 11 | 12 | Final |
|---|---|---|---|---|---|---|---|---|---|---|---|---|---|---|
| STATS | 9 | 6 | 6 | 6 | 5 | 5 | 4 | 9 | 5 | 5 | 5 | 4 | 4 | 2 |
| Coaches | 7 | 5 | 5 | 6–T | 5 | 4–T | 3 | 8 | 4 | 4 | 3 | 3 | 3 | 2 |
