= 2018 Southern Utah Thunderbirds football team =

American college football season

2018 Southern Utah Thunderbirds football
- Conference: Big Sky Conference
- Record: 1–10 (1–7 Big Sky)
- Head coach: Demario Warren (3rd season)
- Offensive coordinator: Justin Walterscheid (3rd season)
- Defensive coordinator: Rod Chance (3rd season)
- Home stadium: Eccles Coliseum

2018 Big Sky Conference football standings
	Conf.			Overall
Team	W		L	W		L
No. 6 Weber State +^	7	–	1	10	–	3
No. 2 Eastern Washington +^	7	–	1	12	–	3
No. 7 UC Davis +^	7	–	1	10	–	3
No. 17 Montana State ^	5	–	3	8	–	5
Idaho State	5	–	3	6	–	5
Montana	4	–	4	6	–	5
Cal Poly	4	–	4	5	–	6
Northern Arizona	3	–	4	4	–	6
Portland State	3	–	5	4	–	7
Idaho	3	–	5	4	–	7
Northern Colorado	2	–	6	2	–	9
Southern Utah	1	–	7	1	–	10
Sacramento State	0	–	7	2	–	8
$ – Conference champion; ^ – FCS playoff participant; Although North Dakota was classified as an independent, games against them still counted as Big Sky Conference games.; Rankings from STATS Poll

The 2018 Southern Utah Thunderbirds football team represented Southern Utah University in the 2018 NCAA Division I FCS football season. They were led by third-year head coach Demario Warren and played their home games at Eccles Coliseum in Cedar City, Utah as seventh-year as members of the Big Sky Conference. They finished the season 1–10, 1–7 in Big Sky play to finish in 12th place.

== Preseason ==
=== Polls ===
On July 16, 2018 during the Big Sky Kickoff in Spokane, Washington, the Thunderbirds were predicted to finish in sixth place in both the coaches and media poll.

=== Preseason All-Conference Team ===
The Thunderbirds had five players selected to the Preseason All-Conference Team.

Marquez Tucker – Sr. OT

PJ Nu’usa – Jr. OG

Zach Larsen – Jr. C

Chinedu Ahanonu – Sr. LB

Jalen Russell – So. CB

== Schedule ==
Date	Time	Opponent	Site	TV	Result	Attendance
September 1	6:00 p.m.	North Alabama*	Eccles Coliseum; Cedar City, UT	Pluto TV 236	L 30–34	8,912
September 8	6:00 p.m.	at Oregon State*	Reser Stadium; Corvallis, OR	P12N	L 25–48	36,448
September 15	9:00 p.m.	at Arizona*	Arizona Stadium; Tucson, AZ	P12N	L 31–62	41,493
September 22	4:00 p.m.	at Northern Arizona	Walkup Skydome; Flagstaff, AZ (Grand Canyon Rivalry)	Pluto TV 239	L 23–31	5,832
October 6	2:00 p.m.	at No. 5 Eastern Washington	Roos Field; Cheney, WA	ATTRM	L 17–55	8,887
October 13	6:00 p.m.	Sacramento State^{†}	Eccles Coliseum; Cedar City, UT	Pluto TV 236	W 48–27	10,424
October 20	3:00 p.m.	at Idaho	Kibbie Dome; Moscow, ID	Pluto TV 242	L 12–31	12,798
October 27	6:00 p.m.	Northern Colorado	Eccles Coliseum; Cedar City, UT	Pluto TV 236	L 39–42	7,106
November 3	1:00 p.m.	Montana	Eccles Coliseum; Cedar City, UT	ATTRM	L 14–57	7,162
November 10	5:00 p.m.	No. 3 Weber State	Eccles Coliseum; Cedar City, UT (Beehive Bowl)	ELVN	L 18–31	7,415
November 17	5:00 p.m.	at Cal Poly	Alex G. Spanos Stadium; San Luis Obispo, CA	Pluto TV 244	L 24–38	4,520
*Non-conference game; ^{†}Homecoming; Rankings from STATS Poll released prior to the game; All times are in Mountain time

- Source: Schedule

== Game summaries ==
=== North Alabama ===
	1	2	3	4	Total
Lions	3	10	7	14	34
Thunderbirds	0	16	7	7	30

=== At Oregon State ===
	1	2	3	4	Total
Thunderbirds	0	7	9	9	25
Beavers	17	24	0	7	48

=== At Arizona ===
	1	2	3	4	Total
Thunderbirds	0	17	0	14	31
Wildcats	7	17	24	14	62

=== At Northern Arizona ===
	1	2	3	4	Total
Thunderbirds	0	7	16	0	23
Lumberjacks	7	7	10	7	31

=== At Eastern Washington ===
	1	2	3	4	Total
Thunderbirds	3	7	7	0	17
No. 5 Eagles	14	20	21	0	55

=== Sacramento State ===
	1	2	3	4	Total
Hornets	21	3	0	3	27
Thunderbirds	7	20	14	7	48

=== At Idaho ===
	1	2	3	4	Total
Thunderbirds	0	0	0	12	12
Vandals	10	14	7	0	31

=== Northern Colorado ===
	1	2	3	4	Total
Bears	14	10	18	0	42
Thunderbirds	8	3	14	14	39

=== Montana ===
	1	2	3	4	Total
Grizzlies	20	10	21	6	57
Thunderbirds	7	7	0	0	14

=== Weber State ===
	1	2	3	4	Total
No. 3 Wildcats	7	14	7	3	31
Thunderbirds	6	6	6	0	18

=== At Cal Poly ===
	1	2	3	4	Total
Thunderbirds	14	7	0	3	24
Mustangs	0	21	7	10	38
