= 2018 Cal Poly Mustangs football team =

American college football season

2018 Cal Poly Mustangs football
- Conference: Big Sky Conference
- Record: 5–6 (4–4 Big Sky)
- Head coach: Tim Walsh (10th season)
- Offensive coordinator: Jim Craft (2nd season)
- Offensive scheme: Spread triple-option
- Defensive coordinator: Josh Brown (7th season)
- Base defense: 3–4
- Home stadium: Alex G. Spanos Stadium

2018 Big Sky Conference football standings
	Conf.			Overall
Team	W		L	W		L
No. 6 Weber State +^	7	–	1	10	–	3
No. 2 Eastern Washington +^	7	–	1	12	–	3
No. 7 UC Davis +^	7	–	1	10	–	3
No. 17 Montana State ^	5	–	3	8	–	5
Idaho State	5	–	3	6	–	5
Montana	4	–	4	6	–	5
Cal Poly	4	–	4	5	–	6
Northern Arizona	3	–	4	4	–	6
Portland State	3	–	5	4	–	7
Idaho	3	–	5	4	–	7
Northern Colorado	2	–	6	2	–	9
Southern Utah	1	–	7	1	–	10
Sacramento State	0	–	7	2	–	8
$ – Conference champion; ^ – FCS playoff participant; Although North Dakota was classified as an independent, games against them still counted as Big Sky Conference games.; Rankings from STATS Poll

The 2018 Cal Poly Mustangs football team represented California Polytechnic State University, San Luis Obispo as member of the Big Sky Conference during the 2018 NCAA Division I FCS football season. Led by tenth-year head coach Tim Walsh, Cal Poly compiled an overall record of 5–6 with a mark of 4–4 in conference play, tying for sixth place in the Big Sky. The Mustangs played home games at Mustang Stadium in San Luis Obispo, California.

== Schedule ==
Date	Time	Opponent	Site	TV	Result	Attendance
September 1	12:30 p.m.	at No. 1 North Dakota State*	Fargodome; Fargo, ND	ESPN+	L 3–49	18,483
September 8	6:05 p.m.	No. 10 Weber State*	Alex G. Spanos Stadium; San Luis Obispo, CA	Pluto TV 244	L 17–24	6,020
September 14	7:05 p.m.	Brown*	Alex G. Spanos Stadium; San Luis Obispo, CA	Pluto TV 244	W 44–15	7,725
September 22	1:05 p.m.	at No. 6 Eastern Washington	Roos Field; Cheney, WA	Pluto TV 234	L 17–70	9,156
September 29	4:05 p.m.	No. 17 Montana	Alex G. Spanos Stadium; San Luis Obispo, CA	ELVN	L 28–48	7,157
October 6	6:00 p.m.	at Sacramento State	Hornet Stadium; Sacramento, CA	Pluto TV 233	W 41–27	8,930
October 20	4:05 p.m.	No. 10 UC Davis	Alex G. Spanos Stadium; San Luis Obispo, CA (Battle for the Golden Horseshoe)	Pluto TV 244	L 10–52	8,503
October 27	4:00 p.m.	at Northern Arizona	Walkup Skydome; Flagstaff, AZ	Pluto TV 239	W 38–28	6,102
November 3	1:00 p.m.	at Montana State	Bobcat Stadium; Bozeman, MT	SWX	L 42–49	16,747
November 10	4:05 p.m.	No. 24 Idaho State^{†}	Alex G. Spanos Stadium; San Luis Obispo, CA	Pluto TV 244	W 37–14	5,250
November 17	4:05 p.m.	Southern Utah	Alex G. Spanos Stadium; San Luis Obispo, CA	Pluto TV 244	W 38–24	4,520
*Non-conference game; ^{†}Homecoming; Rankings from STATS Poll released prior to the game; All times are in Pacific time

The game with Weber State, fellow Big Sky Conference member, on September 8 was considered a non-conference game and had no effect on the Big Sky standings.

== Preseason ==
=== Polls ===
On July 16, 2018, during the Big Sky Kickoff in Spokane, Washington, the Mustangs were predicted to finish in tenth place in the coaches poll and eleventh place in the media poll.

=== Preseason All-Conference Team ===
The Mustangs had one player selected to the Preseason All-Conference Team.

Joe Protheroe – Sr. FB

== Game summaries ==
=== At North Dakota State ===
	1	2	3	4	Total
Mustangs	3	0	0	0	3
No. 1 Bison	7	21	14	7	49

=== Weber State ===
	1	2	3	4	Total
No. 10 Wildcats	7	3	7	7	24
Mustangs	0	3	7	7	17

=== Brown ===
	1	2	3	4	Total
Bears	0	15	0	0	15
Mustangs	3	21	13	7	44

=== At Eastern Washington ===
	1	2	3	4	Total
Mustangs	3	7	7	0	17
No. 6 Eagles	14	21	14	21	70

=== Montana ===
	1	2	3	4	Total
No. 17 Grizzlies	17	14	10	7	48
Mustangs	0	7	14	7	28

=== At Sacramento State ===
	1	2	3	4	Total
Mustangs	14	7	6	14	41
Hornets	14	0	3	10	27

=== UC Davis ===
	1	2	3	4	Total
No. 10 Aggies	0	31	7	14	52
Mustangs	10	0	0	0	10

=== At Northern Arizona ===
	1	2	3	4	Total
Mustangs	0	28	10	0	38
Lumberjacks	7	0	7	14	28

=== At Montana State ===
	1	2	3	4	Total
Mustangs	7	7	7	21	42
Bobcats	14	14	14	7	49

=== At Idaho State ===
	1	2	3	4	Total
No. 24 Bengals	0	7	7	0	14
Mustangs	3	10	7	17	37

=== Southern Utah ===
	1	2	3	4	Total
Thunderbirds	14	7	0	3	24
Mustangs	0	21	7	10	38
