= 2018 Idaho Vandals football team =

American college football season

2018 Idaho Vandals football
- Conference: Big Sky Conference
- Record: 4–7 (3–5 Big Sky)
- Head coach: Paul Petrino (6th season)
- Offensive coordinator: Kris Cinkovich (6th season)
- Offensive scheme: Multiple
- Defensive coordinator: Mike Breske (4th season)
- Base defense: Multiple 3–4
- Home stadium: Kibbie Dome

2018 Big Sky Conference football standings
| | Conf. | | | Overall |
| Team | W | | L | W | | L |
|---|---|---|---|---|---|---|
| No. 6 Weber State +^ | 7 | – | 1 | 10 | – | 3 |
| No. 2 Eastern Washington +^ | 7 | – | 1 | 12 | – | 3 |
| No. 7 UC Davis +^ | 7 | – | 1 | 10 | – | 3 |
| No. 17 Montana State ^ | 5 | – | 3 | 8 | – | 5 |
| Idaho State | 5 | – | 3 | 6 | – | 5 |
| Montana | 4 | – | 4 | 6 | – | 5 |
| Cal Poly | 4 | – | 4 | 5 | – | 6 |
| Northern Arizona | 3 | – | 4 | 4 | – | 6 |
| Portland State | 3 | – | 5 | 4 | – | 7 |
| Idaho | 3 | – | 5 | 4 | – | 7 |
| Northern Colorado | 2 | – | 6 | 2 | – | 9 |
| Southern Utah | 1 | – | 7 | 1 | – | 10 |
| Sacramento State | 0 | – | 7 | 2 | – | 8 |
$ – Conference champion; ^ – FCS playoff participant; Although North Dakota was classified as an independent, games against them still counted as Big Sky Conference games.; Rankings from STATS Poll

The 2018 Idaho Vandals football team represented the University of Idaho in the 2018 NCAA Division I FCS football season. The Vandals played their home games on campus at the Kibbie Dome in Moscow, Idaho, and are members of the Big Sky Conference, which they rejoined for football this season. A charter member of the Big Sky in 1963, Idaho was previously a football member from 1965 through 1995. They were led by sixth-year head coach Paul Petrino and finished the season at 4–7 (3–5 in Big Sky, ninth).

== Preseason ==
=== Polls ===
On July 16, 2018 during the Big Sky Kickoff in Spokane, Washington, the Vandals were predicted to finish in fourth place in the coaches poll and fifth place in the media poll.

=== Preseason All-Conference Team ===
The Vandals had three players selected to the Preseason All-Conference Team.

Noah Johnson – Jr. OL

Kaden Ellis – Sr. LB

Cade Coffey – So. P

== Schedule ==
| Date | Time | Opponent | Site | TV | Result | Attendance |
|---|---|---|---|---|---|---|
| September 1 | 7:00 p.m. | at Fresno State* | Bulldog Stadium; Fresno, CA | Stadium | L 13–79 | 31,170 |
| September 8 | 2:00 p.m. | Western New Mexico* | Kibbie Dome; Moscow, ID | Pluto TV 242 | W 56–10 | 10,566 |
| September 22 | 4:00 p.m. | at No. 21 UC Davis | Aggie Stadium; Davis, CA | ELVN | L 21–44 | 8,179 |
| September 29 | 2:00 p.m. | Portland State | Kibbie Dome; Moscow, ID | SWX | W 20–7 | 10,566 |
| October 6 | 2:30 p.m. | at Idaho State | Holt Arena; Pocatello, ID (Battle of the Domes) | Pluto TV 243 | L 28–62 | 11,015 |
| October 13 | 1:00 p.m. | at Montana State | Bobcat Stadium; Bozeman, MT | RTNW | L 23–24 | 19,177 |
| October 20 | 2:00 p.m. | Southern Utah^{†} | Kibbie Dome; Moscow, ID | SWX | W 31–12 | 12,798 |
| October 27 | 12:00 p.m. | at No. 5 Eastern Washington | Roos Field; Cheney, WA | RTNW | L 14–38 | 10,023 |
| November 3 | 2:00 p.m. | North Dakota | Kibbie Dome; Moscow, ID | SWX | W 31–27 | 7,899 |
| November 10 | 3:30 p.m. | Montana | Kibbie Dome; Moscow, ID (Little Brown Stein) | RTNW | L 27–46 | 14,571 |
| November 17 | 9:00 a.m. | at No. 15 (FBS) Florida* | Ben Hill Griffin Stadium; Gainesville, FL | ESPNU | L 10–63 | 81,467 |
*Non-conference game; ^{†}Homecoming; Rankings from STATS Poll released prior to the game; All times are in Pacific time

== Game summaries ==
=== At Fresno State ===
| | 1 | 2 | 3 | 4 | Total |
|---|---|---|---|---|---|
| Vandals | 6 | 0 | 7 | 0 | 13 |
| Bulldogs | 16 | 28 | 14 | 21 | 79 |

=== Western New Mexico ===
| | 1 | 2 | 3 | 4 | Total |
|---|---|---|---|---|---|
| Mustangs | 3 | 7 | 0 | 0 | 10 |
| Vandals | 7 | 14 | 7 | 28 | 56 |

=== At UC Davis ===
| | 1 | 2 | 3 | 4 | Total |
|---|---|---|---|---|---|
| Vandals | 0 | 7 | 0 | 14 | 21 |
| No. 21 Aggies | 14 | 13 | 17 | 0 | 44 |

=== Portland State ===
| | 1 | 2 | 3 | 4 | Total |
|---|---|---|---|---|---|
| Vikings | 0 | 0 | 7 | 0 | 7 |
| Vandals | 3 | 17 | 0 | 0 | 20 |

=== At Idaho State ===
| | 1 | 2 | 3 | 4 | Total |
|---|---|---|---|---|---|
| Vandals | 7 | 7 | 14 | 0 | 28 |
| Bengals | 14 | 21 | 20 | 7 | 62 |

=== At Montana State ===
| | 1 | 2 | 3 | 4 | Total |
|---|---|---|---|---|---|
| Vandals | 7 | 7 | 3 | 6 | 23 |
| Bobcats | 7 | 0 | 14 | 3 | 24 |

=== Southern Utah ===
| | 1 | 2 | 3 | 4 | Total |
|---|---|---|---|---|---|
| Thunderbirds | 0 | 0 | 0 | 12 | 12 |
| Vandals | 10 | 14 | 7 | 0 | 31 |

=== At Eastern Washington ===
| | 1 | 2 | 3 | 4 | Total |
|---|---|---|---|---|---|
| Vandals | 0 | 0 | 7 | 7 | 14 |
| No. 5 Eagles | 14 | 17 | 7 | 0 | 38 |

=== North Dakota ===
| | 1 | 2 | 3 | 4 | Total |
|---|---|---|---|---|---|
| Fighting Hawks | 7 | 7 | 6 | 7 | 27 |
| Vandals | 14 | 0 | 0 | 17 | 31 |

=== Montana ===
| | 1 | 2 | 3 | 4 | Total |
|---|---|---|---|---|---|
| Grizzlies | 14 | 22 | 7 | 3 | 46 |
| Vandals | 3 | 3 | 7 | 14 | 27 |

=== At Florida ===
| | 1 | 2 | 3 | 4 | Total |
|---|---|---|---|---|---|
| Vandals | 0 | 0 | 3 | 7 | 10 |
| No. 15 (FBS) Gators | 28 | 21 | 7 | 7 | 63 |

== NFL draft ==
| Player | Position | Round | Overall | NFL club |
| Kaden Elliss | LB | 7 | 244 | New Orleans Saints |

- List of Idaho Vandals in the NFL draft
