= 2018 Montana Grizzlies football team =

American college football season

2018 Montana Grizzlies football
- Conference: Big Sky Conference
- Record: 6–5 (4–4 Big Sky)
- Head coach: Bobby Hauck (8th season)
- Offensive coordinator: Timm Rosenbach (2nd season)
- Offensive scheme: Spread
- Defensive coordinator: Kent Baer (1st season)
- Base defense: 3–3–5
- Home stadium: Washington–Grizzly Stadium

2018 Big Sky Conference football standings
	Conf.			Overall
Team	W		L	W		L
No. 6 Weber State +^	7	–	1	10	–	3
No. 2 Eastern Washington +^	7	–	1	12	–	3
No. 7 UC Davis +^	7	–	1	10	–	3
No. 17 Montana State ^	5	–	3	8	–	5
Idaho State	5	–	3	6	–	5
Montana	4	–	4	6	–	5
Cal Poly	4	–	4	5	–	6
Northern Arizona	3	–	4	4	–	6
Portland State	3	–	5	4	–	7
Idaho	3	–	5	4	–	7
Northern Colorado	2	–	6	2	–	9
Southern Utah	1	–	7	1	–	10
Sacramento State	0	–	7	2	–	8
$ – Conference champion; ^ – FCS playoff participant; Although North Dakota was classified as an independent, games against them still counted as Big Sky Conference games.; Rankings from STATS Poll

The 2018 Montana Grizzlies football team represented the University of Montana in the 2018 NCAA Division I FCS football season. The Grizzlies were led by first-year coach Bobby Hauck, 8th overall as he previously was head coach from 2003–2009, and played their home games on campus at Washington–Grizzly Stadium in Missoula, Montana as a charter member of the Big Sky Conference. They finished the season 6–5, 4–4 in Big Sky play to finish in a tie for sixth place.

== Preseason ==
=== Polls ===
On July 16, 2018 during the Big Sky Kickoff in Spokane, Washington, the Grizzlies were predicted to finish in seventh place in the coaches poll and fourth place in the media poll.

=== Preseason All-Conference Team ===
The Grizzlies had one player selected to the Preseason All-Conference Team.

Josh Buss – Sr. LB. Also selected as the preseason defensive player of the year.

=== Award watch lists ===
Listed in the order that they were released

Award	Player	Position	Year
Butkus Award	Josh Buss	LB	SR
Buck Buchanan Award	Josh Buss	LB	SR

== Schedule ==
Date	Time	Opponent	Rank	Site	TV	Result	Attendance
September 1	7:00 p.m.	No. 13 Northern Iowa*	No. 24	Washington–Grizzly Stadium; Missoula, MT	SWX	W 26–23	25,018
September 8	1:00 p.m.	Drake*	No. 14	Washington–Grizzly Stadium; Missoula, MT	SWX	W 48–16	23,132
September 15	2:00 p.m.	at Western Illinois*	No. 15	Hanson Field; Macomb, IL	ESPN+	L 27–31	4,011
September 22	1:00 p.m.	Sacramento State	No. 19	Washington–Grizzly Stadium; Missoula, MT	RTNW	W 41–34	24,060
September 29	5:00 p.m.	at Cal Poly	No. 17	Alex G. Spanos Stadium; San Luis Obispo, CA	ELVN	W 48–28	7,157
October 6	2:00 p.m.	Portland State^{†}	No. 14	Washington–Grizzly Stadium; Missoula, MT	SWX	L 20–22	25,205
October 13	12:00 p.m.	at North Dakota	No. 22	Alerus Center; Grand Forks, ND	SWX	L 14–41	10,497
October 27	2:00 p.m.	No. 6 UC Davis		Washington–Grizzly Stadium; Missoula, MT	SWX	L 21–49	24,141
November 3	1:00 p.m.	at Southern Utah		Eccles Coliseum; Cedar City, UT	RTNW	W 57–14	7,162
November 10	4:30 p.m.	at Idaho		Kibbie Dome; Moscow, ID (Little Brown Stein)	RTNW	W 46–27	14,571
November 17	12:00 p.m.	No. 25 Montana State		Washington–Grizzly Stadium; Missoula, MT (rivalry)	RTNW	L 25–29	26,508
*Non-conference game; ^{†}Homecoming; Rankings from STATS Poll released prior to the game; All times are in Mountain time

== Game summaries ==
=== Northern Iowa ===
	1	2	3	4	Total
No. 13 Panthers	0	0	7	16	23
No. 24 Grizzlies	16	10	0	0	26

=== Drake ===
	1	2	3	4	Total
Bulldogs	0	3	7	6	16
No. 14 Grizzlies	3	7	21	17	48

=== At Western Illinois ===
	1	2	3	4	Total
No. 15 Grizzlies	18	0	3	6	27
Leathernecks	14	3	0	14	31

=== Sacramento State ===
	1	2	3	4	Total
Hornets	14	14	3	3	34
No. 19 Grizzlies	14	10	7	10	41

=== At Cal Poly ===
	1	2	3	4	Total
No. 17 Grizzlies	17	14	10	7	48
Mustangs	0	7	14	7	28

=== Portland State ===
	1	2	3	4	Total
Vikings	10	3	0	9	22
No. 14 Grizzlies	0	0	14	6	20

=== At North Dakota ===
	1	2	3	4	Total
No. 22 Grizzlies	0	0	0	14	14
Fighting Hawks	21	13	0	7	41

=== UC Davis ===
	1	2	3	4	Total
No. 6 Aggies	3	0	10	36	49
Grizzlies	7	14	0	0	21

=== At Southern Utah ===
	1	2	3	4	Total
Grizzlies	20	10	21	6	57
Thunderbirds	7	7	0	0	14

=== At Idaho ===
	1	2	3	4	Total
Grizzlies	14	22	7	3	46
Vandals	3	3	7	14	27

=== Montana State ===
#25 Montana State Bobcats (6–4) at Montana Grizzlies (6–4)

Quarter	1	2	3	4	Total
Montana St	0	7	0	22	29
Montana	7	15	0	3	25

at Washington–Grizzly Stadium, Missoula, Montana

- Date: November 17, 2018
- Game time: 12:00 p.m.
- Game weather: Sunny, 30 °F (−1 °C)
- Game attendance: 26,508
- Box Score

Game information

First quarter

- UM – Gabe Sulser 1-yard pass from Dalton Sneed (Tim Semenza kick), 12:31. Montana 7–0. Drive: 6 plays, 73 yards, 2:29.

Second quarter

- UM – Adam Eastwood 1-yard run (Tim Semenza kick), 13:30. Montana 14–0. Drive: 10 plays, 58 yards, 3:41.
- UM – Samuel Akem 37-yard pass from Dalton Sneed (run good), 8:15. Montana 22–0. Drive: 2 plays, 39 yards, 0:40.
- MSU – Troy Andersen 3-yard run (Tristan Bailey kick), 0:23. Montana 22–7. Drive: 10 plays, 72 yards, 2:43.

Third quarter

- No scoring

Fourth quarter

- MSU – Troy Andersen 1-yard run (run good), 14:24. Montana 22–15. Drive: 9 plays, 87 yards, 3:15.
- UM – Tim Semenza 34-yard field goal, 7:46. Montana 25–15. Drive: 14 plays, 58 yards, 6:32.
- MSU – Troy Andersen 1-yard run (Tristan Bailey kick), 6:01. Montana 25–22. Drive: 7 plays, 75 yards, 1:45.
- MSU – Logan Jones 13-yard run (Tristan Bailey kick), 2:19. Montana St 29–25. Drive: 7 plays, 35 yards, 2:57.

Top passers

- MSU – Troy Andersen – 15/24, 158 yards
- UM – Dalton Sneed – 22/34, 354 yards, 2 TD

Top rushers

- MSU – Troy Andersen – 23 rushes, 107 yards, 3 TD
- UM – Jerry Louie-McGee – 4 rushes, 43 yards

Top receivers

- MSU – Travis Jonsen – 11 receptions, 101 yards
- UM – Samuel Akem – 6 receptions, 147 yards, TD

== Ranking movements ==
Ranking movements Legend: ██ Increase in ranking ██ Decrease in ranking — = Not ranked RV = Received votes
	Week													
Poll	Pre	1	2	3	4	5	6	7	8	9	10	11	12	Final
STATS FCS	24	14	15	19	17	14	22	RV	RV	—	RV	RV	RV	
Coaches	25	16	16	20	18	15	23	RV	—	—	—	RV	RV	
