= 2018 Northern Arizona Lumberjacks football team =

American college football season

2018 Northern Arizona Lumberjacks football
- Conference: Big Sky Conference
- Record: 4–6 (3–4 Big Sky)
- Head coach: Jerome Souers (21st season)
- Offensive coordinator: Aaron Pflugrad (1st season)
- Defensive coordinator: Andy Thompson (10th season)
- Home stadium: Walkup Skydome

2018 Big Sky Conference football standings
	Conf.			Overall
Team	W		L	W		L
No. 6 Weber State +^	7	–	1	10	–	3
No. 2 Eastern Washington +^	7	–	1	12	–	3
No. 7 UC Davis +^	7	–	1	10	–	3
No. 17 Montana State ^	5	–	3	8	–	5
Idaho State	5	–	3	6	–	5
Montana	4	–	4	6	–	5
Cal Poly	4	–	4	5	–	6
Northern Arizona	3	–	4	4	–	6
Portland State	3	–	5	4	–	7
Idaho	3	–	5	4	–	7
Northern Colorado	2	–	6	2	–	9
Southern Utah	1	–	7	1	–	10
Sacramento State	0	–	7	2	–	8
$ – Conference champion; ^ – FCS playoff participant; Although North Dakota was classified as an independent, games against them still counted as Big Sky Conference games.; Rankings from STATS Poll

The 2018 Northern Arizona Lumberjacks football team represented Northern Arizona University in the 2018 NCAA Division I FCS football season. They were led by 21st-year head coach Jerome Souers and played their home games at the Walkup Skydome. They were a member of the Big Sky Conference. They finished the season 4–6, 3–4 in Big Sky play to finish in eighth place.

On November 19, Jerome Souers announced his retirement. He finished with a 21-year record of 123–114.

== Preseason ==
=== Polls ===
On July 16, 2018, during the Big Sky Kickoff in Spokane, Washington, the Lumberjacks were predicted to finish in third place by both the coaches and media.

=== Preseason All-Conference Team ===
The Lumberjacks had three players selected to the Preseason All-Conference Team.

Emmanuel Butler – Sr. WR

Khalil Dorsey – Jr. CB

Wes Sutton – Sr. S

=== Award watch lists ===
Award	Player	Position	Year
Walter Payton Award	Case Cookus	QB	JR

== Schedule ==
Date	Time	Opponent	Rank	Site	TV	Result	Attendance
September 1	4:30 p.m.	at UTEP*		Sun Bowl; El Paso, TX	ESPN3	W 30–10	17,271
September 8	4:00 p.m.	No. 6 Eastern Washington*	No. 18	Walkup Skydome; Flagstaff, AZ	KASW; NAU-TV	L 26–31	8,938
September 15	12:00 p.m.	at Missouri State*	No. 20	Robert W. Plaster Stadium; Springfield, MO	ESPN3	L 8–40	7,217
September 22	4:00 p.m.	Southern Utah		Walkup Skydome; Flagstaff, AZ (Grand Canyon Rivalry)	KASW; NAU-TV	W 31–23	5,832
September 29	2:30 p.m.	at Idaho State		Holt Arena; Pocatello, ID	Pluto TV 243	L 42–56	9,129
October 6	2:30 p.m.	No. 6 Weber State		Walkup Skydome; Flagstaff, AZ	ELVN	W 28–24	10,000
October 20	11:00 a.m.	at Northern Colorado		Nottingham Field; Greeley, CO	ELVN	L 14–42	3,522
October 27	4:00 p.m.	Cal Poly^{†}		Walkup Skydome; Flagstaff, AZ	KASW; NAU-TV	L 28–38	6,102
November 3	1:00 p.m.	at No. 6 UC Davis		Aggie Stadium; Davis, CA	Pluto TV 245	L 20–42	7,890
~~November 10~~	~~7:00 p.m.~~	at ~~Sacramento State~~		~~Hornet Stadium~~; ~~Sacramento, CA~~	~~KASW~~; ~~NAU-TV~~	Cancelled (Note: The game against Sacramento State on November 10 was cancelled due to unhealthy air quality as a result of the Camp Fire in Northern California.)	–
November 17	2:30 p.m.	North Dakota		Walkup Skydome; Flagstaff, AZ	KASW; NAU-TV	W 31–16	4,306
*Non-conference game; ^{†}Homecoming; Rankings from STATS Poll released prior to the game; All times are in Mountain time

- Source: Official Schedule

Despite also being a member of the Big Sky, the game vs. Eastern Washington will be a non-conference game and will have no effect on the Big Sky standings.

== Rankings ==
Ranking movements Legend: ██ Increase in ranking ██ Decrease in ranking — = Not ranked RV = Received votes
	Week													
Poll	Pre	1	2	3	4	5	6	7	8	9	10	11	12	Final
STATS FCS	RV	18	20	RV	RV	—	RV	RV	—	—	—	—	—	
Coaches	RV	20	22	RV	RV	—	—	RV	—	—	—	—	—	

== Game summaries ==
=== At UTEP ===
	1	2	3	4	Total
Lumberjacks	10	7	13	0	30
Miners	0	10	0	0	10

=== Eastern Washington ===
	1	2	3	4	Total
No. 6 Eagles	14	7	7	3	31
No. 18 Lumberjacks	0	10	3	13	26

=== At Missouri State ===
	1	2	3	4	Total
No. 20 Lumberjacks	0	6	0	2	8
Bears	10	13	10	7	40

=== Southern Utah ===
	1	2	3	4	Total
Thunderbirds	0	7	16	0	23
Lumberjacks	7	7	10	7	31

=== At Idaho State ===
	1	2	3	4	Total
Lumberjacks	7	7	14	14	42
Bengals	7	28	14	7	56

=== Weber State ===
	1	2	3	4	Total
No. 6 Wildcats	0	8	13	3	24
Lumberjacks	7	0	14	7	28

=== At Northern Colorado ===
	1	2	3	4	Total
Lumberjacks	7	7	0	0	14
Bears	12	0	16	14	42

=== Cal Poly ===
	1	2	3	4	Total
Mustangs	0	28	10	0	38
Lumberjacks	7	0	7	14	28

=== At UC Davis ===
	1	2	3	4	Total
Lumberjacks	0	6	0	14	20
No. 6 Aggies	21	0	7	14	42

=== North Dakota ===
	1	2	3	4	Total
Fighting Hawks	0	10	3	3	16
Lumberjacks	14	3	7	7	31

== Roster ==
2018 Northern Arizona Lumberjacks roster
Quarterbacks: 3 Geno Campiotti, Freshman; 10 Daniel Bridge-Gadd, Sophomore; 15 Case Cookus, Junior; 17 Connor Leavens, (redshirt) Freshman; Running backs: 2 Nate Stinson, Sophomore; 6 Cory Young, Senior; 9 Jacob Mpungi, Freshman; 22 Joe Logan, Junior; 31 Aramis Aldredge, Sophomore; Wide receivers: 1 Emmanuel Butler, Senior; 7 Chancellor Brewington, Sophomore; 8 Stacy Chukwumezie, Junior; 16 Cam Denson, Graduate Student; 18 Brandon Porter, (redshirt) Freshman; 23 Malik Lovette, Junior; 36 DJ Young, Senior; 46 Tommie Dorsey, Junior; 48 Riley Langton, Freshman; 81 Justis Stokes, Sophomore; 83 Terrell Brown, Sophomore; 84 Anthony Brown, Junior; 86 Luke Nguyen, Junior; 87 Gino Mastrandrea, Junior; 88 Joey Gatewood, Junior	Tight ends: 40 Bric Parmley, Freshman; 43 Jarek Schultz, Freshman; 44 Max Michalczik, (redshirt) Freshman; 82 Jacob Ayala, Freshman; 85 Matthew Kempton, Sophomore; 89 Jonathan Baldwin, Senior; Offensive Lineman: 52 Luke Rudolph, Sophomore; 53 Jasean Harrison, Sophomore; 58 Trevor Reinwald, Junior; 61 Cole Habib, Senior; 62 Jamison Pruitt, Junior; 63 Alim Benbrahim, (redshirt) Freshman; 65 Malik Noshi, Junior; 66 Chase Laurita, Sophomore; 68 Mitchell Kay, Junior; 69 Jonas Leader, (redshirt) Freshman; 70 Chris Rodgers, Freshman; 71 Jason Lindon, Junior; 73 Keenan Norris, Sophomore; 74 Josh Sparks, Senior; 77 James Bain, Graduate Student; 79 Jalen Hooper, Freshman	Defensive line: 45 Hamilton To'o, Senior; 50 Chris Jules, Junior; 51 Seth Long, (redshirt) Freshman; 54 Brandon Boyce, (redshirt) Senior; 56 Brandon Lawless, Junior; 76 Seth Clem, (redshirt) Freshman; 77 John Clark, Freshman; 78 Travis Seideman, Sophomore; 90 Aaron Andrews, Junior; 91 Sione Talakai, Senior; 92 Adonis Battle, Junior; 93 Chauntez Thomas, Sophomore; 94 Jackson Vaught, Freshman; 95 Jalen Goss, Junior; 96 Dylon Hessenflow, Freshman; 97 Jalen Knox, (redshirt) Freshman; 98 Gregory Jordan, Sophomore; 99 Carson Taylor, Sophomore; Linebackers: 4 Taylor Powell, Junior; 11 Jake Casteel, Senior; 24 Larry Davis III, Freshman; 33 Tristen Vance, Junior; 34 Derek Edwards, Freshman; 37 Spencer Cox, (redshirt) Freshman; 42 Marcus Carrasco, (redshirt) Freshman; 46 Cameron Richards, (redshirt) Freshman; 48 Jason Pasano, Freshman; 49 Ed Obeh, Junior; 55 Keenan Mitchell, Sophomore; 57 Markquise Simmons, Senior; 59 Owen Dickens, (redshirt) Freshman; Defensive backs: 3 Kam'ron Johnson, Senior; 5 Jamarri Jackson, Sophomore; 10 Elijah Orr, Sophomore; 12 Anthony Sweeney, Sophomore; 13 Marcus Myers, Junior; 19 Heath Beemiller, Freshman; 20 Maurice Davison, Senior; 21 Sherrod Paige, Junior; 25 Ricky Manning, Freshman; 26 Nate Perkins (redshirt) Freshman; 27 Myles Dumas, Sophomore; 28 Wes Sutton, Senior; 29 Khalil Dorsey, Junior; 30 Jalen Cook, Junior; 32 Jalen Swanigan, Junior; 35 Curtiss Wilson, Sophomore; 36 Jayden Wooden, (redshirt) Freshman; 37 Jovon Sewell, Freshman; 38 Cejai Parrish, Freshman; 47 Dyvine Wallace, (redshirt) Sophomore; Fullback: 20 Jacinto Castillo, (redshirt) Freshman; Place kickers: 41 Luis Aguilar, Sophomore; Punters: 17 Cameron Horsting, Junior; 19 DJ Arnson, Sophomore; Long snappers: 64 Justin Hathoot, Sophomore; 80 Harrison Goebel, Junior
