= 2018 Idaho State Bengals football team =

American college football season

2018 Idaho State Bengals football
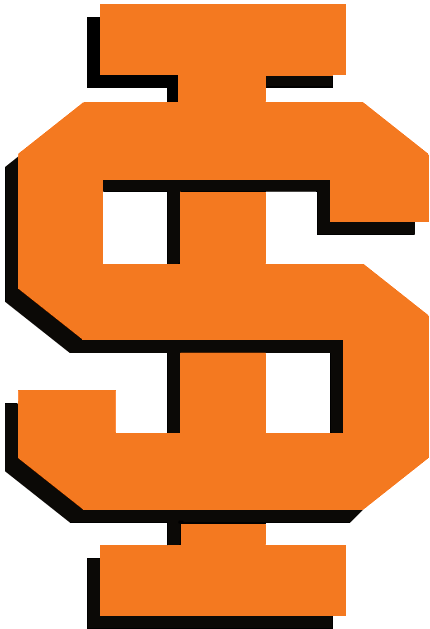
- Conference: Big Sky Conference
- Record: 6–5 (5–3 Big Sky)
- Head coach: Rob Phenicie (2nd season)
- Offensive coordinator: Mike Ferriter (1st season)
- Defensive coordinator: Roger Cooper (4th season)
- Home stadium: Holt Arena

2018 Big Sky Conference football standings
| | Conf. | | | Overall |
| Team | W | | L | W | | L |
|---|---|---|---|---|---|---|
| No. 6 Weber State +^ | 7 | – | 1 | 10 | – | 3 |
| No. 2 Eastern Washington +^ | 7 | – | 1 | 12 | – | 3 |
| No. 7 UC Davis +^ | 7 | – | 1 | 10 | – | 3 |
| No. 17 Montana State ^ | 5 | – | 3 | 8 | – | 5 |
| Idaho State | 5 | – | 3 | 6 | – | 5 |
| Montana | 4 | – | 4 | 6 | – | 5 |
| Cal Poly | 4 | – | 4 | 5 | – | 6 |
| Northern Arizona | 3 | – | 4 | 4 | – | 6 |
| Portland State | 3 | – | 5 | 4 | – | 7 |
| Idaho | 3 | – | 5 | 4 | – | 7 |
| Northern Colorado | 2 | – | 6 | 2 | – | 9 |
| Southern Utah | 1 | – | 7 | 1 | – | 10 |
| Sacramento State | 0 | – | 7 | 2 | – | 8 |
$ – Conference champion; ^ – FCS playoff participant; Although North Dakota was classified as an independent, games against them still counted as Big Sky Conference games.; Rankings from STATS Poll

The 2018 Idaho State Bengals football team represented Idaho State University as a member of the Big Sky Conference during the 2018 NCAA Division I FCS football season. Led by second-year head coach Rob Phenicie, the Bengals compiled an overall record of 6–5 with a mark of 5–3 in conference play, tying for fourth place in the Big Sky. Idaho State played their home games at Holt Arena in Pocatello, Idaho.

== Preseason ==
=== Polls ===
On July 16, 2018 during the Big Sky Kickoff in Spokane, Washington, the Bengals were predicted to finish in twelfth place in the coaches poll and tenth place in the media poll.

=== Preseason All-Conference Team ===
The Bengals had one player selected to the Preseason All-Conference Team.

James Madison – Sr. RB

== Schedule ==
| Date | Time | Opponent | Rank | Site | TV | Result | Attendance |
|---|---|---|---|---|---|---|---|
| August 31 | 6:30 p.m. | Western Colorado* | | Holt Arena; Pocatello, ID | Pluto TV 243 | W 45–10 | 5,062 |
| September 15 | 4:00 p.m. | at California* | | California Memorial Stadium; Berkeley, CA | P12N | L 23–45 | 37,104 |
| September 22 | 3:00 p.m. | at No. 22 North Dakota | | Alerus Center; Grand Forks, ND | Pluto TV 240 | W 25–21 | 11,157 |
| September 29 | 2:30 p.m. | Northern Arizona^{†} | | Holt Arena; Pocatello, ID | Pluto TV 243 | W 56–42 | 9,129 |
| October 6 | 3:30 p.m. | Idaho | | Holt Arena; Pocatello, ID (rivalry) | Pluto TV 243 | W 62–28 | 11,015 |
| October 13 | 5:00 p.m. | at No. 14 UC Davis | | Aggie Stadium; Davis, CA | Pluto TV 245 | L 37–44 ^{OT} | 10,849 |
| October 20 | 12:00 p.m. | at Liberty* | | Williams Stadium; Lynchburg, VA | ESPN3 | L 41–48 | 16,502 |
| October 27 | 3:30 p.m. | Montana State | | Holt Arena; Pocatello, ID | ELVN | W 24–17 | 8,851 |
| November 3 | 3:00 p.m. | at Portland State | | Hillsboro Stadium; Hillsboro, OR | ELVN | W 48–45 | 3,924 |
| November 10 | 5:00 p.m. | at Cal Poly | No. 24 | Alex G. Spanos Stadium; San Luis Obispo, CA | Pluto TV 244 | L 14–37 | 5,250 |
| November 17 | 2:30 p.m. | No. 3 Weber State | | Holt Arena; Pocatello, ID | Pluto TV 235 | L 13–26 | 10,077 |
*Non-conference game; ^{†}Homecoming; Rankings from STATS Poll released prior to the game; All times are in Mountain time

== Game summaries ==
=== Western Colorado ===
| | 1 | 2 | 3 | 4 | Total |
|---|---|---|---|---|---|
| Mountaineers | 0 | 3 | 7 | 0 | 10 |
| Bengals | 14 | 17 | 14 | 0 | 45 |

=== At California ===
| | 1 | 2 | 3 | 4 | Total |
|---|---|---|---|---|---|
| Bengals | 0 | 3 | 6 | 14 | 23 |
| Golden Bears | 7 | 21 | 3 | 14 | 45 |

=== At North Dakota ===
| | 1 | 2 | 3 | 4 | Total |
|---|---|---|---|---|---|
| Bengals | 6 | 13 | 0 | 6 | 25 |
| No. 22 Fighting Hawks | 14 | 7 | 0 | 0 | 21 |

=== Northern Arizona ===
| | 1 | 2 | 3 | 4 | Total |
|---|---|---|---|---|---|
| Lumberjacks | 7 | 7 | 14 | 14 | 42 |
| Bengals | 7 | 28 | 14 | 7 | 56 |

=== Idaho ===
| | 1 | 2 | 3 | 4 | Total |
|---|---|---|---|---|---|
| Vandals | 7 | 7 | 14 | 0 | 28 |
| Bengals | 14 | 21 | 20 | 7 | 62 |

=== At UC Davis ===
| | 1 | 2 | 3 | 4 | OT | Total |
|---|---|---|---|---|---|---|
| Bengals | 9 | 14 | 7 | 7 | 0 | 37 |
| No. 14 Aggies | 7 | 7 | 8 | 15 | 7 | 44 |

=== At Liberty ===
| | 1 | 2 | 3 | 4 | Total |
|---|---|---|---|---|---|
| Bengals | 0 | 17 | 14 | 10 | 41 |
| Flames | 7 | 13 | 14 | 14 | 48 |

=== Montana State ===
| | 1 | 2 | 3 | 4 | Total |
|---|---|---|---|---|---|
| Bobcats | 7 | 0 | 0 | 10 | 17 |
| Bengals | 0 | 17 | 7 | 0 | 24 |

=== At Portland State ===
| | 1 | 2 | 3 | 4 | Total |
|---|---|---|---|---|---|
| Bengals | 14 | 17 | 10 | 7 | 48 |
| Vikings | 3 | 21 | 14 | 7 | 45 |

=== At Cal Poly ===
| | 1 | 2 | 3 | 4 | Total |
|---|---|---|---|---|---|
| No. 24 Bengals | 0 | 7 | 7 | 0 | 14 |
| Mustangs | 3 | 10 | 7 | 17 | 37 |

=== Weber State ===
| | 1 | 2 | 3 | 4 | Total |
|---|---|---|---|---|---|
| No. 3 Wildcats | 3 | 13 | 7 | 3 | 26 |
| Bengals | 0 | 0 | 13 | 0 | 13 |

== Ranking movements ==
Ranking movements Legend: ██ Increase in ranking ██ Decrease in ranking — = Not ranked RV = Received votes
| | Week | | | | | | | | | | | | | |
| Poll | Pre | 1 | 2 | 3 | 4 | 5 | 6 | 7 | 8 | 9 | 10 | 11 | 12 | Final |
|---|---|---|---|---|---|---|---|---|---|---|---|---|---|---|
| STATS | — | — | — | — | RV | RV | RV | RV | RV | RV | 24 | RV | RV | |
| Coaches | — | — | — | — | — | RV | RV | RV | RV | RV | 25 | RV | RV | |
