= 2018 Northern Colorado Bears football team =

American college football season

2018 Northern Colorado Bears football
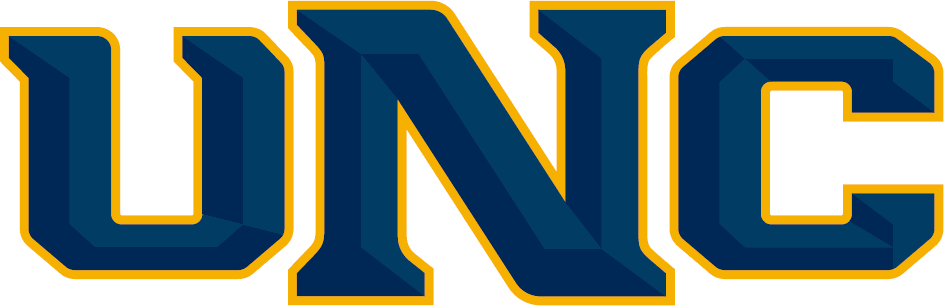
- Conference: Big Sky Conference
- Record: 2–9 (2–6 Big Sky)
- Head coach: Earnest Collins Jr. (8th season)
- Offensive coordinator: Jon Boyer (1st season)
- Offensive scheme: Spread
- Defensive coordinator: Marty English (1st season)
- Base defense: 4–3
- Home stadium: Nottingham Field

2018 Big Sky Conference football standings
| | Conf. | | | Overall |
| Team | W | | L | W | | L |
|---|---|---|---|---|---|---|
| No. 6 Weber State +^ | 7 | – | 1 | 10 | – | 3 |
| No. 2 Eastern Washington +^ | 7 | – | 1 | 12 | – | 3 |
| No. 7 UC Davis +^ | 7 | – | 1 | 10 | – | 3 |
| No. 17 Montana State ^ | 5 | – | 3 | 8 | – | 5 |
| Idaho State | 5 | – | 3 | 6 | – | 5 |
| Montana | 4 | – | 4 | 6 | – | 5 |
| Cal Poly | 4 | – | 4 | 5 | – | 6 |
| Northern Arizona | 3 | – | 4 | 4 | – | 6 |
| Portland State | 3 | – | 5 | 4 | – | 7 |
| Idaho | 3 | – | 5 | 4 | – | 7 |
| Northern Colorado | 2 | – | 6 | 2 | – | 9 |
| Southern Utah | 1 | – | 7 | 1 | – | 10 |
| Sacramento State | 0 | – | 7 | 2 | – | 8 |
$ – Conference champion; ^ – FCS playoff participant; Although North Dakota was classified as an independent, games against them still counted as Big Sky Conference games.; Rankings from STATS Poll

The 2018 Northern Colorado Bears football team, represented the University of Northern Colorado in the 2018 NCAA Division I FCS football season. They were led by eighth-year head coach Earnest Collins Jr. and played their home games at Nottingham Field. They were a member of the Big Sky Conference. They finished the season 2–9, 2–6 in Big Sky play to finish in 11th place.

== Preseason ==
=== Polls ===
On July 16, 2018 during the Big Sky Kickoff in Spokane, Washington, the Bears were predicted to finish in eleventh place in the coaches poll and twelfth place in the media poll.

=== Preseason All-Conference Team ===
The Bears had one player selected to the Preseason All-Conference Team.

Alex Wesley – Sr. WR

== Schedule ==
| Date | Time | Opponent | Site | TV | Result | Attendance |
|---|---|---|---|---|---|---|
| September 1 | 2:00 p.m. | No. 17 McNeese State* | Nottingham Field; Greeley, CO | Pluto TV 241 | L 14–17 | 5,672 |
| September 8 | 1:00 p.m. | at No. 23 South Dakota* | DakotaDome; Vermillion, SD | ESPN+ | L 28–43 | 9,143 |
| September 15 | 2:00 p.m. | Sacramento State* | Nottingham Field; Greeley, CO | ELVN | L 25–28 | 3,768 |
| September 22 | 6:00 p.m. | at No. 7 Weber State | Stewart Stadium; Odgen, UT | Pluto TV 235 | L 28–45 | 8,668 |
| September 29 | 12:00 p.m. | North Dakota | Nottingham Field; Greeley, CO | Pluto TV 241 | L 13–38 | 4,902 |
| October 6 | 12:00 p.m. | No. 16 UC Davis^{†} | Nottingham Field; Greeley, CO | Pluto TV 241 | L 36–49 | 4,155 |
| October 13 | 3:00 p.m. | at Portland State | Providence Park; Portland, OR | Pluto TV 232 | L 14–35 | 4,375 |
| October 20 | 12:00 p.m. | Northern Arizona | Nottingham Field; Greeley, CO | ELVN | W 42–14 | 3,522 |
| October 27 | 6:00 p.m. | at Southern Utah | Eccles Coliseum; Cedar City, UT | Pluto TV 236 | W 42–39 | 7,106 |
| November 3 | 12:00 p.m. | No. 5 Eastern Washington | Nottingham Field; Greeley, CO | ELVN | L 13–48 | 3,274 |
| November 10 | 1:00 p.m. | at Montana State | Bobcat Stadium; Missoula, MT | ATTRM | L 7–35 | 14,147 |
*Non-conference game; ^{†}Homecoming; Rankings from STATS Poll released prior to the game; All times are in Mountain time

- Source: Schedule

Despite also being a member of the Big Sky, the game vs. Sacramento State will be a non-conference game and will have no effect on the Big Sky standings.

== Game summaries ==
=== McNeese State ===
| | 1 | 2 | 3 | 4 | Total |
|---|---|---|---|---|---|
| No. 17 Cowboys | 10 | 7 | 0 | 0 | 17 |
| Bears | 0 | 0 | 0 | 14 | 14 |

=== At South Dakota ===
| | 1 | 2 | 3 | 4 | Total |
|---|---|---|---|---|---|
| Bears | 14 | 0 | 0 | 14 | 28 |
| No. 23 Coyotes | 14 | 20 | 0 | 9 | 43 |

=== Sacramento State ===
| | 1 | 2 | 3 | 4 | Total |
|---|---|---|---|---|---|
| Hornets | 7 | 0 | 7 | 14 | 28 |
| Bears | 7 | 7 | 3 | 8 | 25 |

=== At Weber State ===
| | 1 | 2 | 3 | 4 | Total |
|---|---|---|---|---|---|
| Bears | 7 | 14 | 7 | 0 | 28 |
| No. 7 Wildcats | 14 | 7 | 14 | 10 | 45 |

=== North Dakota ===
| | 1 | 2 | 3 | 4 | Total |
|---|---|---|---|---|---|
| Fighting Hawks | 3 | 21 | 0 | 14 | 38 |
| Bears | 0 | 7 | 0 | 6 | 13 |

=== UC Davis ===
| | 1 | 2 | 3 | 4 | Total |
|---|---|---|---|---|---|
| No. 16 Aggies | 14 | 14 | 14 | 7 | 49 |
| Bears | 0 | 10 | 0 | 26 | 36 |

=== At Portland State ===
| | 1 | 2 | 3 | 4 | Total |
|---|---|---|---|---|---|
| Bears | 0 | 0 | 0 | 14 | 14 |
| Vikings | 14 | 14 | 7 | 0 | 35 |

=== Northern Arizona ===
| | 1 | 2 | 3 | 4 | Total |
|---|---|---|---|---|---|
| Lumberjacks | 7 | 7 | 0 | 0 | 14 |
| Bears | 12 | 0 | 16 | 14 | 42 |

=== At Southern Utah ===
| | 1 | 2 | 3 | 4 | Total |
|---|---|---|---|---|---|
| Bears | 14 | 10 | 18 | 0 | 42 |
| Thunderbirds | 8 | 3 | 14 | 14 | 39 |

=== Eastern Washington ===
| | 1 | 2 | 3 | 4 | Total |
|---|---|---|---|---|---|
| No. 5 Eagles | 13 | 7 | 14 | 14 | 48 |
| Bears | 0 | 0 | 13 | 0 | 13 |

=== At Montana State ===
| | 1 | 2 | 3 | 4 | Total |
|---|---|---|---|---|---|
| Bears | 7 | 0 | 0 | 0 | 7 |
| Bobcats | 7 | 14 | 0 | 14 | 35 |
