= 2018 Weber State Wildcats football team =

American college football season

2018 Weber State Wildcats football

Big Sky co-champion

FCS Playoffs Quarterfinals, L 18–23 vs. Maine
- Conference: Big Sky Conference

Ranking
- STATS: No. 6
- FCS Coaches: No. 6
- Record: 10–3 (7–1 Big Sky)
- Head coach: Jay Hill (5th season)
- Offensive coordinator: Dave Schramm (1st season)
- Home stadium: Stewart Stadium

2018 Big Sky Conference football standings
	Conf.			Overall
Team	W		L	W		L
No. 6 Weber State +^	7	–	1	10	–	3
No. 2 Eastern Washington +^	7	–	1	12	–	3
No. 7 UC Davis +^	7	–	1	10	–	3
No. 17 Montana State ^	5	–	3	8	–	5
Idaho State	5	–	3	6	–	5
Montana	4	–	4	6	–	5
Cal Poly	4	–	4	5	–	6
Northern Arizona	3	–	4	4	–	6
Portland State	3	–	5	4	–	7
Idaho	3	–	5	4	–	7
Northern Colorado	2	–	6	2	–	9
Southern Utah	1	–	7	1	–	10
Sacramento State	0	–	7	2	–	8
$ – Conference champion; ^ – FCS playoff participant; Although North Dakota was classified as an independent, games against them still counted as Big Sky Conference games.; Rankings from STATS Poll

The 2018 Weber State Wildcats football team represented Weber State University in the 2018 NCAA Division I FCS football season. The Wildcats were led by fourth-year head coach Jay Hill and played their games at Stewart Stadium as members of the Big Sky Conference. They finished the season 10–3, 7–1 in Big Sky play to finish in a three-way tie for the Big Sky championship with Eastern Washington and UC Davis. They received the Big Sky's automatic bid to the FCS Playoffs where, after a first round bye, they defeated Southeast Missouri State in the second round before losing in the quarterfinals to Maine.

== Preseason ==
=== Polls ===
On July 16, 2018, during the Big Sky Kickoff in Spokane, Washington, the Wildcats were predicted to finish in second place by both the coaches and media.

=== Preseason All-Conference Team ===
The Wildcats had a conference leading six players selected to the Preseason All-Conference Team.

Iosua Opeta – Sr. OT

Trey Tuttle, – So. K

Rashid Shaheed – So. KR

Jonah Williams – Jr. DE

LeGrand Toia, – Sr. LB

Brady May – Sr. ST Specialist

== Schedule ==
Date	Time	Opponent	Rank	Site	TV	Result	Attendance
August 30	6:00 p.m.	at Utah*	No. 8	Rice-Eccles Stadium; Salt Lake City, UT	P12N	L 10–41	45,988
September 8	7:00 p.m.	at Cal Poly*	No. 10	Alex G. Spanos Stadium; San Luis Obispo, CA	Pluto TV 244	W 24–17	6,020
September 15	6:00 p.m.	No. 22 South Dakota*	No. 11	Stewart Stadium; Ogden, UT	Pluto TV 235	W 27–10	8,455
September 22	6:00 p.m.	Northern Colorado	No. 7	Stewart Stadium; Ogden, UT	Pluto TV 235	W 45–28	8,668
October 6	2:30 p.m.	at Northern Arizona	No. 6	Walkup Skydome; Flagstaff, AZ	ELVN	L 24–28	10,000
October 13	4:00 p.m.	No. 4 Eastern Washington^{†}	No. 13	Stewart Stadium; Ogden, UT	ELVN	W 14–6	8,211
October 20	4:00 p.m.	Montana State	No. 7	Stewart Stadium; Ogden, UT	ATTRM	W 34–24	8,062
October 27	1:00 p.m.	at No. 22 North Dakota	No. 4	Alerus Center; Grand Forks, ND	Pluto TV 240	W 35–30	8,650
November 3	12:00 p.m.	Sacramento State	No. 4	Stewart Stadium; Ogden, UT	Pluto TV 235	W 26–14	7,857
November 10	5:00 p.m.	at Southern Utah	No. 3	Eccles Coliseum; Cedar City, UT (Beehive Bowl)	ELVN	W 31–18	7,415
November 17	2:30 p.m.	at Idaho State	No. 3	Holt Arena; Pocatello, ID	Pluto TV 243	W 26–13	10,077
December 1	2:00 p.m.	No. 20 Southeast Missouri State*	No. 3	Stewart Stadium; Ogden, UT (FCS Playoffs Second Round)	ESPN3	W 48–23	8,838
December 7	6:00 p.m.	No. 12 Maine	No. 3	Stewart Stadium; Ogden, UT (FCS Playoffs Quarterfinals)	ESPN2	L 18–23	7,726
*Non-conference game; ^{†}Homecoming; Rankings from STATS Poll released prior to the game; All times are in Mountain time

- Source: Official Schedule

Despite also being a member of the Big Sky, the game against Cal Poly was considered a non-conference matchup having no effect on conference standings.

== Game summaries ==
=== At Utah ===
	1	2	3	4	Total
No. 8 Wildcats	10	0	0	0	10
Utes	7	10	14	10	41

=== At Cal Poly ===
	1	2	3	4	Total
No. 10 Wildcats	7	3	7	7	24
Mustangs	0	3	7	7	17

=== South Dakota ===
	1	2	3	4	Total
No. 22 Coyotes	0	3	0	7	10
No. 11 Wildcats	11	7	3	6	27

=== Northern Colorado ===
	1	2	3	4	Total
Bears	7	14	7	0	28
No. 7 Wildcats	14	7	14	10	45

=== At Northern Arizona ===
	1	2	3	4	Total
No. 6 Wildcats	0	8	13	3	24
Lumberjacks	7	0	14	7	28

=== At Eastern Washington ===
	1	2	3	4	Total
No. 13 Wildcats	14	0	0	0	14
No. 4 Eagles	0	3	3	0	6

=== Montana State ===
	1	2	3	4	Total
Bobcats	7	10	7	0	24
No. 7 Wildcats	0	14	10	10	34

=== At North Dakota ===
	1	2	3	4	Total
No. 4 Wildcats	7	14	7	7	35
No. 22 Fighting Hawks	0	20	3	7	30

=== Sacramento State ===
	1	2	3	4	Total
Hornets	0	0	7	7	14
No. 4 Wildcats	3	10	13	0	26

=== At Southern Utah ===
	1	2	3	4	Total
No. 3 Wildcats	7	14	7	3	31
Thunderbirds	6	6	6	0	18

=== At Idaho State ===
	1	2	3	4	Total
No. 3 Wildcats	3	9	7	7	26
Bengals	0	0	13	0	13

== FCS Playoffs ==
=== Southeast Missouri State–Second Round ===
	1	2	3	4	Total
No. 20 Redhawks	7	0	7	9	23
No. 3 Wildcats	0	27	7	14	48

=== Maine–Quarterfinals ===
	1	2	3	4	Total
No. 12 Black Bears	0	7	7	9	23
No. 3 Wildcats	0	3	9	6	18

== Ranking movements ==
Ranking movements Legend: ██ Increase in ranking ██ Decrease in ranking
	Week													
Poll	Pre	1	2	3	4	5	6	7	8	9	10	11	12	Final
STATS FCS	8	10	11	7	6	6	13	7	4	4	3	3	3	6
Coaches	8	13	13	8	7	7	13	9	5	5	4	4	3	6
