= 2018 NCAA Division I FCS football season =

American college football season

2018 NCAA Division I FCS season

Regular season
- Number of teams: 125
- Duration: August 25 – November 17
- Payton Award: Samford quarterback Devlin Hodges
- Buchanan Award: Southeast Missouri State linebacker Zach Hall

Playoff
- Duration: November 24 – December 15
- Championship date: January 5, 2019
- Championship site: Toyota Stadium, Frisco, Texas
- Champion: North Dakota State

NCAA Division I FCS football seasons
- «2017 2019»

The 2018 NCAA Division I FCS football season, part of college football in the United States, was organized by the National Collegiate Athletic Association (NCAA) at the Division I Football Championship Subdivision (FCS) level. The FCS Championship Game was played on January 5, 2019, in Frisco, Texas. North Dakota State claimed its second consecutive FCS title, and seventh in eight years, defeating Eastern Washington, 38-24.

== Conference changes and new programs ==
School	2017 conference	2018 conference
Campbell	Pioneer	Big South
Hampton	MEAC	FCS Independent
Idaho	Sun Belt (FBS)	Big Sky
Liberty	Big South	FBS Independent
North Alabama	Gulf South (D–II)	FCS Independent
North Dakota	Big Sky	FCS Independent

== Notable headlines ==
- June 13 – Major changes to redshirt rules in Division I football (both FBS and FCS) were approved by the NCAA Division I Council. From the 2018 season forward, players could participate in as many as four games in a given season while still retaining redshirt status.
- September 15 – Hurricane Florence caused unprecedented disruption to college football schedules. For FCS teams alone, the storm forced the cancellation of six games (Elon at William & Mary, Savannah State at Howard, Tennessee State at Hampton, Presbyterian at Stetson, Walsh (D-II) at Jacksonville, and Colgate at Furman) and the rescheduling of nine others.
- October 27 – Central Connecticut's Aaron Dawson ran for 308 yards in the second half, a record for a half throughout Division I, and 361 yards overall to lead the Blue Devils to a 49–24 win over Wagner.
- November 17 – In the final game of his college career, Samford quarterback Devlin Hodges set a new FCS record for career passing yardage, surpassing late Alcorn State and NFL great Steve McNair in the Bulldogs' 38–27 win over East Tennessee State. Hodges finished his career with 14,584 yards.

== FCS team wins over FBS teams ==
Italics denotes FBS teams.

Date	Visiting team	Home team	Site	Result	Attendance	Ref.
August 30	UC Davis	San José State	CEFCU Stadium • San Jose, California	44–38	12,675	
September 1	No. 18 Nicholls	Kansas	David Booth Kansas Memorial Stadium • Lawrence, Kansas	26–23 ^{OT}	24,305	
September 1	Northern Arizona	UTEP	Sun Bowl • El Paso, Texas	30–10	17,271	
September 1	No. 19 Villanova	Temple	Lincoln Financial Field • Philadelphia, Pennsylvania (Mayor's Cup)	19–17	32,357	
September 2	No. 14 North Carolina A&T	East Carolina	Dowdy–Ficklen Stadium • Greenville, North Carolina	28–23	38,640	
September 8	No. 22 Maine	Western Kentucky	Houchens Industries–L. T. Smith Stadium • Bowling Green, Kentucky	31–28	15,178	
September 22	No. 16 Illinois State	Colorado State	Canvas Stadium • Fort Collins, Colorado	35–19	26,259	
^{#}Rankings from STATS poll released prior to the game.

== Conference changes and new programs ==
School	2017 conference	2018 conference
Campbell	Pioneer	Big South
Hampton	MEAC	FCS Independent
Idaho	Sun Belt (FBS)	Big Sky
Liberty	Big South	FBS Independent
North Alabama	Gulf South (D–II)	FCS Independent
North Dakota	Big Sky	FCS Independent

== Conference standings ==
2018 Big Sky Conference football standings
	Conf.			Overall
Team	W		L	W		L
No. 6 Weber State +^	7	–	1	10	–	3
No. 2 Eastern Washington +^	7	–	1	12	–	3
No. 7 UC Davis +^	7	–	1	10	–	3
No. 17 Montana State ^	5	–	3	8	–	5
Idaho State	5	–	3	6	–	5
Montana	4	–	4	6	–	5
Cal Poly	4	–	4	5	–	6
Northern Arizona	3	–	4	4	–	6
Portland State	3	–	5	4	–	7
Idaho	3	–	5	4	–	7
Northern Colorado	2	–	6	2	–	9
Southern Utah	1	–	7	1	–	10
Sacramento State	0	–	7	2	–	8
$ – Conference champion; ^ – FCS playoff participant; Although North Dakota was classified as an independent, games against them still counted as Big Sky Conference games.; Rankings from STATS Poll

2018 Big South Conference football standings
	Conf.			Overall
Team	W		L	W		L
No. 5 Kennesaw State $^	5	–	0	11	–	2
Monmouth	4	–	1	8	–	3
Charleston Southern	3	–	2	5	–	6
Gardner–Webb	2	–	3	3	–	8
Campbell	1	–	4	6	–	5
Presbyterian	0	–	5	2	–	8
$ – Conference champion; ^ – FCS playoff participant; Rankings from STATS Poll

2018 Colonial Athletic Association football standings
	Conf.			Overall
Team	W		L	W		L
No. 4 Maine $^	7	–	1	10	–	4
No. 9 James Madison ^	6	–	2	9	–	4
No. 16 Stony Brook ^	5	–	3	7	–	5
No. 20 Towson ^	5	–	3	7	–	5
No. 24 Delaware ^	5	–	3	7	–	5
No. 19 Elon ^	4	–	3	6	–	5
Rhode Island	4	–	4	6	–	5
William & Mary	3	–	4	4	–	6
New Hampshire	3	–	5	4	–	7
Villanova	2	–	6	5	–	6
Richmond	2	–	6	4	–	7
Albany	1	–	7	3	–	8
$ – Conference champion; ^ – FCS playoff participant; Rankings from STATS Poll

2018 Ivy League football standings
	Conf.			Overall
Team	W		L	W		L
No. 11 Princeton $	7	–	0	10	–	0
No. 18 Dartmouth	6	–	1	9	–	1
Harvard	4	–	3	6	–	4
Yale	3	–	4	5	–	5
Penn	3	–	4	6	–	4
Columbia	3	–	4	6	–	4
Cornell	2	–	5	3	–	7
Brown	0	–	7	1	–	9
$ – Conference champion; Rankings from STATS Poll

2018 Mid-Eastern Athletic Conference football standings
	Conf.			Overall
Team	W		L	W		L
No. 12 North Carolina A&T $	6	–	1	9	–	2
Bethune–Cookman	5	–	2	7	–	5
Florida A&M	5	–	2	6	–	5
South Carolina State	4	–	3	5	–	6
Howard	4	–	3	4	–	6
North Carolina Central	3	–	4	5	–	6
Morgan State	3	–	4	4	–	7
Norfolk State	2	–	5	4	–	7
Delaware State	2	–	5	3	–	8
Savannah State	1	–	6	2	–	8
$ – Conference champion; Rankings from STATS Poll

2018 Missouri Valley Football Conference standings
	Conf.			Overall
Team	W		L	W		L
No. 1 North Dakota State $^	8	–	0	15	–	0
No. 3 South Dakota State ^	6	–	2	10	–	3
No. 23 Northern Iowa ^	5	–	3	7	–	6
Indiana State	5	–	3	7	–	4
Western Illinois	4	–	4	5	–	6
Illinois State	3	–	5	6	–	5
Youngstown State	3	–	5	4	–	7
South Dakota	3	–	5	4	–	7
Missouri State	2	–	6	4	–	7
Southern Illinois	1	–	7	2	–	9
$ – Conference champion; ^ – FCS playoff participant; Rankings from STATS Poll

2018 Northeast Conference football standings
	Conf.			Overall
Team	W		L	W		L
No. 21 Duquesne +^	5	–	1	8	–	3
Sacred Heart +	5	–	1	7	–	4
Central Connecticut	4	–	2	6	–	5
Wagner	3	–	3	4	–	7
Saint Francis (PA)	2	–	4	4	–	7
Bryant	2	–	4	6	–	5
Robert Morris	0	–	6	2	–	9
+ – Conference co-champions; ^ – FCS playoff participant; Rankings from STATS Poll

2018 Ohio Valley Conference football standings
	Conf.			Overall
Team	W		L	W		L
No. 10 Jacksonville State $^	7	–	1	8	–	3
No. 15 Southeast Missouri State ^	6	–	2	8	–	3
Eastern Kentucky	5	–	2	7	–	4
Murray State	5	–	3	5	–	6
Tennessee State	3	–	4	4	–	5
Eastern Illinois	3	–	5	3	–	8
Austin Peay	3	–	5	5	–	6
UT Martin	2	–	6	2	–	9
Tennessee Tech	1	–	7	1	–	10
$ – Conference champion; ^ – FCS playoff participant; Rankings from STATS Poll

2018 Patriot League football standings
	Conf.			Overall
Team	W		L	W		L
No. 8 Colgate $^	6	–	0	10	–	2
Holy Cross	4	–	2	5	–	6
Georgetown	4	–	2	5	–	6
Lehigh	2	–	4	3	–	8
Lafayette	2	–	4	3	–	8
Fordham	2	–	4	2	–	9
Bucknell	1	–	5	1	–	10
$ – Conference champion; ^ – FCS playoff participant; Rankings from STATS Poll

2018 Pioneer Football League standings
	Conf.			Overall
Team	W		L	W		L
No. 25 San Diego $^	8	–	0	9	–	3
Stetson	6	–	2	8	–	2
Drake	6	–	2	7	–	4
Marist	5	–	3	5	–	6
Dayton	5	–	3	6	–	5
Davidson	3	–	5	6	–	5
Butler	2	–	6	4	–	7
Morehead State	2	–	6	3	–	8
Valparaiso	2	–	6	2	–	9
Jacksonville	1	–	7	2	–	8
$ – Conference champion; ^ – FCS playoff participant; Rankings from STATS Poll

2018 Southern Conference football standings
	Conf.			Overall
Team	W		L	W		L
No. 13 Wofford +^	6	–	2	9	–	4
No. 22 East Tennessee State +^	6	–	2	8	–	4
Furman +	6	–	2	6	–	4
Samford	5	–	3	6	–	5
Chattanooga	4	–	4	6	–	5
The Citadel	4	–	4	5	–	6
Mercer	4	–	4	5	–	6
Western Carolina	1	–	7	3	–	8
VMI	0	–	8	1	–	10
+ – Conference co-champions; ^ – FCS playoff participant; Rankings from STATS Poll

2018 Southland Conference football standings
	Conf.			Overall
Team	W		L	W		L
No. 14 Nicholls +^	7	–	2	9	–	4
Incarnate Word +^	6	–	2	6	–	5
Lamar ^	6	–	3	7	–	5
Abilene Christian	5	–	4	6	–	5
Central Arkansas	5	–	4	6	–	5
McNeese State	5	–	4	6	–	5
Sam Houston State	5	–	4	6	–	5
Northwestern State	4	–	5	5	–	6
Southeastern Louisiana	4	–	5	4	–	7
Stephen F. Austin	2	–	7	2	–	8
Houston Baptist	0	–	9	1	–	10
+ – Conference co-champions; ^ – FCS playoff participant; Rankings from STATS poll

2018 Southwestern Athletic Conference football standings
	Conf.			Overall
Team	W		L	W		L
East Division
Alcorn State x$	6	–	1	9	–	4
Alabama A&M	5	–	2	6	–	5
Jackson State	4	–	3	5	–	5
Alabama State	3	–	4	4	–	7
Mississippi Valley State	1	–	6	1	–	10
West Division
Southern xy	6	–	1	7	–	4
Grambling State	4	–	3	6	–	5
Prairie View A&M	4	–	3	5	–	6
Texas Southern	1	–	6	2	–	9
Arkansas–Pine Bluff	1	–	6	2	–	9
Championship: Alcorn State 37, Southern 28
$ – Conference champion; x – Division champion/co-champions; y – Championship game participant

2018 NCAA Division I FCS independents football standings
	Conf.			Overall
Team	W		L	W		L
North Alabama		–		7	–	3
Hampton		–		7	–	3
North Dakota		–		6	–	5

== Conference summaries ==
=== Championship games ===
Conference	Champion	Runner-up	Score	Offensive Player of the Year	Defensive Player of the Year	Coach of the Year
SWAC	Alcorn State; 9–3 (6–1)	Southern; 7–4 (6–1)	37–28	Noah Johnson (Alcorn State)	De’Arius Christmas (Grambling State)	Fred McNair (Alcorn State)

=== Other conference winners ===
Note: Records are regular-season only, and do not include playoff games.

Conference	Champion	Record	Offensive Player of the Year	Defensive Player of the Year	Coach of the Year
Big Sky	Eastern Washington; UC Davis; Weber State	9–2 (7–1); 9–2 (7–1); 9–2 (7–1)	Jake Maier (UC Davis)	Jay-Tee Tiuli (Eastern Washington)	Aaron Best (Eastern Washington); Dan Hawkins (UC Davis)
Big South	Kennesaw State	10–1 (5–0)	Chandler Burks (Kennesaw State)	Anthony Gore, Jr. (Kennesaw State)	Brian Bohanon (Kennesaw State)
CAA	Maine	8–3 (7–1)	Tom Flacco (Towson)	Jimmy Moreland (James Madison)	Joe Harasymiak (Maine)
Ivy	Princeton	10–0 (7–0)	John Lovett (Princeton)	Isiah Swann (Dartmouth)	Bob Surace (Princeton)
MEAC	North Carolina A&T	9–2 (6–1)	Caylin Newton (Howard)	Darryl Johnson Jr. (North Carolina A&T)	Sam Washington (North Carolina A&T)
MVFC	North Dakota State	11–0 (8–0)	Easton Stick (North Dakota State)	Jabril Cox (North Dakota State)	Curt Mallory (Indiana State)
NEC	Duquesne; Sacred Heart	8–3 (5–1); 7–4 (5–1)	A. J. Hines (Duquesne)	Cam Gill (Wagner)	Mark Nofri (Sacred Heart); Jerry Schmitt (Duquesne)
OVC	Jacksonville State	8–3 (7–1)	Marquis Terry (Southeast Missouri State)	Zach Hall (Southeast Missouri State)	Tom Matukewicz (Southeast Missouri State)
Patriot	Colgate	9–1 (6–0)	James Holland, Jr. (Colgate)	T. J. Hill (Colgate)	Dan Hunt (Colgate)
Pioneer	San Diego	9–2 (8–0)	Anthony Lawrence (San Diego)	Nathan Clayberg (Drake)	Roger Hughes (Stetson)
Southern	East Tennessee State; Furman; Wofford	8–3 (6–2); 6–4 (6–2); 8–3 (6–2)	Devlin Hodges (Samford)	Isaiah Mack (Chattanooga)	Randy Sanders (East Tennessee State)
Southland	Incarnate Word; Nicholls	6–4 (6–2); 8–3 (7–2)	Jazz Ferguson (Northwestern State)	B. J. Blunt (McNeese State)	Eric Morris (Incarnate Word)

== Playoff qualifiers ==
=== Automatic berths for conference champions ===
Conference	Team	Appearance	Last bid	Result
Big Sky Conference	Weber State	7th	2017	Quarterfinals (L – James Madison)
Big South Conference	Kennesaw State	2nd	2017	Quarterfinals (L – Sam Houston State)
Colonial Athletic Association	Maine	8th	2013	Second Round (L – New Hampshire)
Missouri Valley Football Conference	North Dakota State	9th	2017	National Champions (W – James Madison)
Northeast Conference	Duquesne	2nd	2015	First Round (L – William & Mary)
Ohio Valley Conference	Jacksonville State	9th	2017	Second Round (L – Kennesaw State)
Patriot League	Colgate	11th	2015	Quarterfinals (L – Sam Houston State)
Pioneer Football League	San Diego	4th	2017	Second Round (L – North Dakota State)
Southern Conference	Wofford	9th	2017	Quarterfinals (L – North Dakota State)
Southland Conference	Nicholls	5th	2017	First Round (L – South Dakota)

=== At large qualifiers ===
Conference	Team	Appearance	Last bid	Result
Big Sky Conference	Eastern Washington	13th	2016	Semifinals (L – Youngstown State)
Big Sky Conference	UC Davis	1st	–	
Big Sky Conference	Montana State	9th	2014	First Round (L – South Dakota State)
Colonial Athletic Association	Delaware	16th	2010	Championship Game (L – Eastern Washington)
Colonial Athletic Association	Elon	3rd	2017	First Round (L – Furman)
Colonial Athletic Association	James Madison	15th	2017	Championship Game (L – North Dakota State)
Colonial Athletic Association	Stony Brook	4th	2017	Second Round (L – James Madison)
Colonial Athletic Association	Towson	3rd	2013	Championship Game (L – North Dakota State)
Missouri Valley Football Conference	Northern Iowa	20th	2017	Second Round (L – South Dakota State)
Missouri Valley Football Conference	South Dakota State	8th	2017	Semifinals (L – James Madison)
Ohio Valley Conference	Southeast Missouri State	2nd	2010	Second Round (L – Eastern Washington)
Southern Conference	East Tennessee State	2nd	1996	Quarterfinals (L – Montana)
Southland Conference	Incarnate Word	1st	–	
Southland Conference	Lamar	1st	–	

=== Abstentions ===
- Ivy League – Princeton
- Mid-Eastern Athletic Conference – North Carolina A&T
- Southwestern Athletic Conference – Alcorn State

== Postseason ==
=== Bowl game ===
Date	Game	Site	Television	Participants	Affiliations	Results
December 15	Celebration Bowl	Mercedes-Benz Stadium; Atlanta, Georgia; 12:00 pm	ABC	North Carolina A&T Aggies (9–2); Alcorn State Braves (9–3)	MEAC; SWAC	North Carolina A&T 24; Alcorn State 22

=== NCAA Division I playoff bracket ===
First Round; November 24; Campus sites ESPN3
Montana State	35
Incarnate Word	14
James Madison	20
Delaware	6
Wofford	19
Elon	7
Towson	10
Duquesne	31
SE Missouri State	28
Stony Brook	14
Jacksonville State	34
ETSU	27
Nicholls	49
San Diego	30
Northern Iowa	16
Lamar	13

Second Round; December 1 Campus sites ESPN3
1	North Dakota State	52
Montana State	10
8	Colgate	23
James Madison	20
4	Kennesaw State	13
Wofford	10
5	South Dakota State	51
Duquesne	6
2	Weber State	48
SE Missouri State	23
7	Maine	55
Jacksonville State	27
3	Eastern Washington	42
Nicholls	21
6	UC Davis	23
Northern Iowa	16

Quarterfinals; December 7/8; Campus sites ESPN, ESPN2, ESPN3
1	North Dakota State	35
8	Colgate	0
4	Kennesaw State	17
5	South Dakota State	27
2	Weber State	18
7	Maine	23
3	Eastern Washington	34
6	UC Davis	29

Semifinals; December 14/15; Campus sites ESPN2
1	North Dakota State	44
5	South Dakota State	21
7	Maine	19
3	Eastern Washington	50

National Championship
January 5 – Toyota Stadium (ESPN2)
1	North Dakota State	38
3	Eastern Washington	24

== Pre-season international exhibitions ==
Date	Name	Location	NCAA team	Hosting Team	Score
May 26, 2018	Drake-China Ambassadors Bowl	UIBE, Beijing, China	Drake	China All-Stars (AFLC, CAFL, & CBL)	77–0

== Kickoff games ==
One kickoff game was played during "Week Zero" on August 25:

- FCS Kickoff (Cramton Bowl, Montgomery): North Carolina A&T defeated Jacksonville State, 20–17

== Awards and honors ==
=== Walter Payton Award ===
- The Walter Payton Award is given to the year's most outstanding offensive player. Finalists:
  - Chandler Burks (QB), Kennesaw State
  - Devlin Hodges (QB), Samford
  - Easton Stick (QB), North Dakota State

=== Buck Buchanan Award ===
- The Buck Buchanan Award is given to the year's most outstanding defensive player. Finalists:
  - Zach Hall (LB), Southeast Missouri State
  - Dante Olson (LB), Montana
  - Derick Roberson (DE), Sam Houston State

=== Jerry Rice Award ===
- The Jerry Rice Award is given to the year's most outstanding freshman.
  - Winner: Josh Davis (RB), Weber State

=== Coaches ===
- AFCA Coach of the Year: Joe Harasymiak, Maine
- Eddie Robinson Award: Dan Hawkins, UC Davis

== Coaching changes ==
=== Preseason and in-season ===
This is restricted to coaching changes that took place on or after May 1, 2018. For coaching changes that occurred earlier in 2018, see 2017 NCAA Division I FCS end-of-season coaching changes.

School	Outgoing coach	Date	Reason	Replacement
Stephen F. Austin	Clint Conque	August 6	Resigned	Jeff Byrd (interim)
Jackson State	Tony Hughes	October 28	Fired	John Hendrick (Note: Interim for remainder of season; interim tag removed on November 28, 2018.)

=== End of season ===
School	Outgoing coach	Date	Reason	Replacement
Eastern Illinois	Kim Dameron	November 18	Contract not renewed	Adam Cushing
William & Mary	Jimmye Laycock	November 18	Retired	Mike London
Howard	Mike London	November 19	Hired as head coach by William & Mary	Ron Prince
Northern Arizona	Jerome Souers	November 19	Retired	Chris Ball
Brown	Phil Estes	November 19	Resigned	James Perry
McNeese State	Lance Guidry	November 20	Contract not renewed	Sterlin Gilbert
Sacramento State	Jody Sears	November 26	Fired	Troy Taylor
Texas Southern	Michael Haywood	November 27	Resigned	Clarence McKinney
Stephen F. Austin	Jeff Byrd (interim)	December 1	Permanent replacement	Colby Carthel
James Madison	Mike Houston	December 3	Hired as head coach by East Carolina	Curt Cignetti
Bryant	James Perry	December 3	Hired as head coach by Brown	Chris Merritt
Austin Peay	Will Healy	December 4	Hired as head coach by Charlotte	Mark Hudspeth
Charleston Southern	Mark Tucker	December 7	Resigned	Autry Denson
Savannah State	Erik Raeburn	December 7	Fired	Shawn Quinn (interim)
Lehigh	Andy Coen	December 7	Retired	Tom Gilmore
North Dakota State	Chris Klieman	December 10	Hired as head coach by Kansas State	Matt Entz
Drake	Rick Fox	December 10	Resigned	Todd Stepsis
North Carolina Central	Granville Eastman (interim)	December 12	Permanent replacement	Trei Oliver
Chattanooga	Tom Arth	December 14	Hired as head coach by Akron	Rusty Wright
Elon	Curt Cignetti	December 14	Hired as head coach by James Madison	Tony Trisciani
Maine	Joe Harasymiak	December 21	Hired as defensive assistant by Minnesota	Nick Charlton
Bucknell	Joe Susan	January 14	Resigned	Dave Cecchini
Central Connecticut	Peter Rossomando	January 23	Hired as offensive line coach by Rutgers	Ryan McCarthy
Valparaiso	Dave Cecchini	February 6	Hired as head coach by Bucknell	Landon Fox
Morgan State	Ernest T. Jones (interim)	February 7	Permanent replacement	Tyrone Wheatley

== Attendances ==
Top 30 teams by average home attendance:

#	Team	Home games	Total attendance	Average attendance
1	Jackson State Tigers	4	99,079	24,770
2	Montana Grizzlies	6	148,064	24,677
3	James Madison Dukes	6	125,466	20,911
4	Southern Jaguars	4	75,212	18,803
5	North Dakota State Bison	10	181,055	18,106
6	Florida A&M Rattlers	6	107,239	17,873
7	Jacksonville State Gamecocks	6	101,421	16,904
8	Montana State Bobcats	7	115,299	16,471
9	Delaware Fightin' Blue Hens	6	97,791	16,299
10	Alabama State Hornets	4	64,293	16,073
11	North Carolina A&T Aggies	5	77,468	15,494
12	Alcorn State Braves	6	91,103	15,184
13	Alabama A&M Bulldogs	4	50,086	12,522
14	Youngstown State Penguins	6	69,322	11,554
15	Idaho Vandals	5	56,400	11,280
16	McNeese Cowboys	5	54,814	10,963
17	Western Carolina Catamounts	5	52,900	10,580
18	Tennessee State Tigers	4	41,688	10,422
19	South Dakota State Jackrabbits	7	71,243	10,178
20	New Hampshire Wildcats	6	60,921	10,154
21	Harvard Crimson	5	49,211	9,842
22	Mercer Bears	5	49,015	9,803
23	South Dakota Coyotes	5	47,098	9,420
24	The Citadel Bulldogs	5	46,715	9,343
25	Northern Iowa Panthers	6	56,020	9,337
26	North Dakota Fighting Hawks	5	46,682	9,336
27	Illinois State Redbirds	6	55,561	9,260
28	William & Mary Tribe	4	36,922	9,231
29	South Carolina State Bulldogs	5	45,871	9,174
30	Abilene Christian Wildcats	5	44,953	8,991

== See also ==
- 2018 NCAA Division I FCS football rankings
- 2018 NCAA Division I FBS football season
- 2018 NCAA Division II football season
