= Washington–Grizzly Stadium =

American college football location

- The Mecca of the FCS
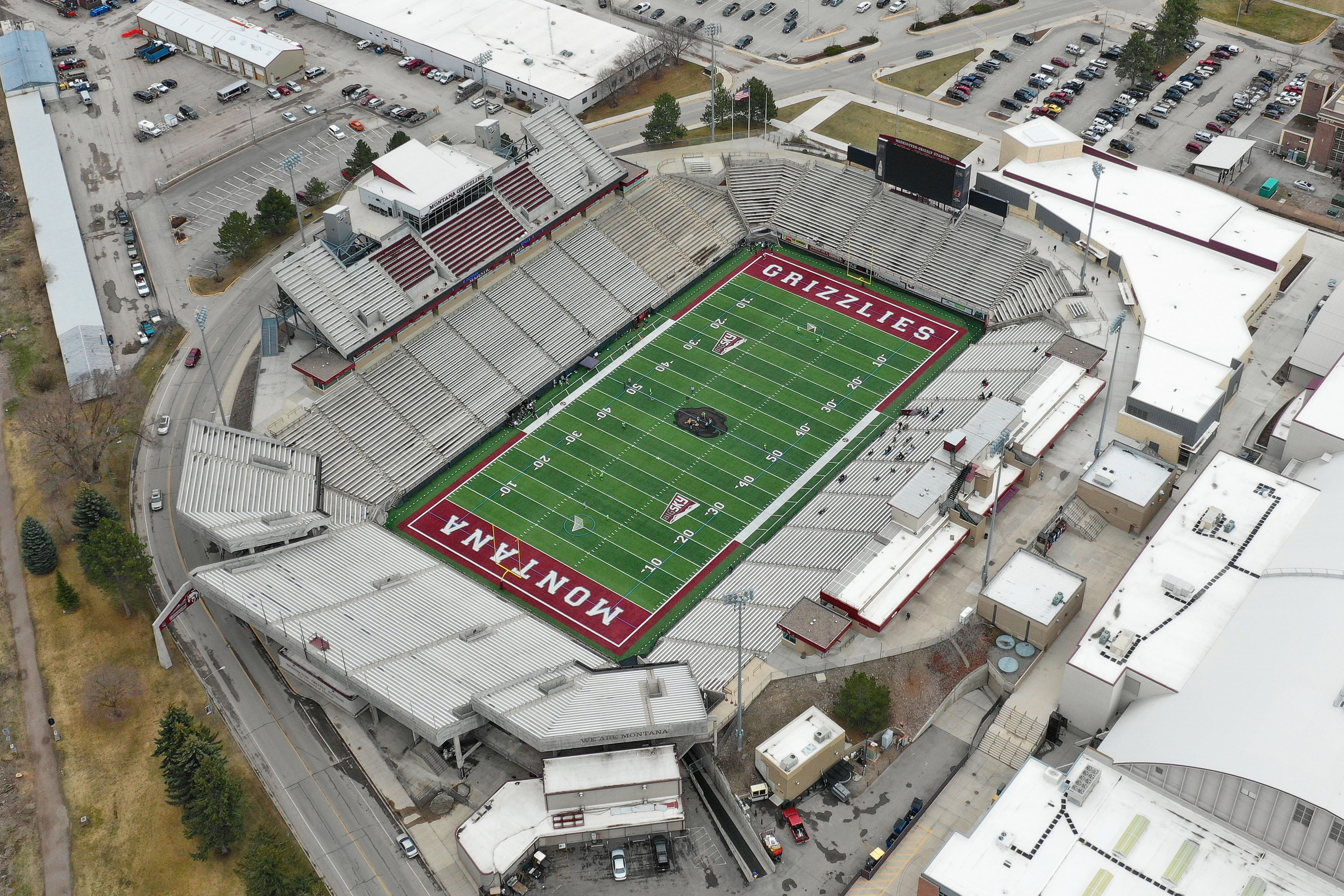
- Aerial view from northwest in 2019

- Location within the United States Location within Montana
- Interactive map of Washington–Grizzly Stadium
- Address: Campus Drive
- Location: University of Montana; Missoula, Montana, U.S.
- Coordinates: 46.864°N 113.981°W
- Elevation: 3,190 feet (970 m) AMSL
- Owner: University of Montana
- Operator: University of Montana
- Capacity: 25,217 (2008–present); 23,183 (2003–2007); 19,005 (2002); 18,845 (1995–2001); 12,500 (1986–1994)
- Surface: FieldTurf – (2016–present); SprinTurf – (2001–2016); Natural grass – (1986–2000)
- Record attendance: 27,340 (November 22, 2025)

Construction
- Groundbreaking: September 1985
- Opened: October 18, 1986; 39 years ago
- Cost: $3.2 million ($9.4 million in 2025)
- Architects: Fox, Ballas & Barrow; Rossman, Schneider & Gadvery

Tenants
- Montana Grizzlies – NCAA (1986–present); Missoula County Public Schools

Washington–Grizzly Stadium is an outdoor college football stadium in the western United States, located on the campus of the University of Montana in Missoula, Montana. Opened 40 years ago in 1986, it is home to the Montana Grizzlies, a member of the Big Sky Conference in Division I FCS (formerly Division I-AA).

Its infilled FieldTurf playing field is twenty feet (6 m) below ground level at an elevation of 3,190 feet (970 m) above sea level and runs in the traditional north–south orientation. The press box is above the west sideline and lights were added for the 2012 season.

With 25,217 seats, it is the largest all-purpose stadium in the state of Montana, and is the largest football stadium in the Big Sky Conference.

== History ==
The stadium is named after construction magnate Dennis Washington, born in Washington, who donated $1 million to finance the stadium's construction in 1985. The inaugural game came in mid-season in 1986 (October 18), and the Griz have a record of 233–35 (.869) at the venue, through the 2023 season. Montana has gone undefeated at home in twelve of those seasons; the Griz won all ten home games in 2004 and posted a 9–0 mark seven times (1994, 1995, 1996, 2001, 2008, 2009, 2023).

=== Capacity and expansions ===
The current seating capacity is 25,217 and it has been expanded three times, most recently in 2008 with an upper deck expansion of 2,000 seats on the east side.

The original capacity in 1986 was 12,500 permanent seats on the sidelines with open grass seating behind the end zones, an approximate capacity of 15,000, weather-permitting. Permanent seating for the end zones was installed in 1995, which brought the seating to 18,845. Corner seating in the north end zone opened in 2003 and the most recent expansion in 2008 to the east grandstand brought the capacity to 25,217.

A new attendance record was set in 2015 when ESPN and four-time defending national champion North Dakota State opened the FCS season on August 29 and drew 26,472. The previous record was 26,352, set in 2014 against rival Montana State on November 22; both games were Grizzly victories. The current attendance record of 27,340 was set at the 2025 Brawl of the Wild when the Grizzlies lost to Montana State.

=== Field surface ===
Infilled SprinTurf was installed in 2001, and replaced in 2008. For its first fifteen seasons, the playing surface was natural grass; with the addition of the artificial turf in 2001, the playing surface was renamed "John Hoyt Field."

After fifteen seasons of SprinTurf, the playing surface was replaced with multi-color FieldTurf in the summer of 2016. Following the installation of FieldTurf in the new softball stadium (Grizzly Field), FieldTurf pitched the university with a new football field and within a month, it was approved by the board of regents and installed.

The turf was replaced again in 2026 due to a new partnership with Montana Knife Company.

=== GrizVision ===
The video screen GrizVision, was installed in 2002 in the south end zone; at 26 by 36 feet (8 m × 11 m), it was one of the largest screens in an FCS football stadium and was upgraded in 2016 to a much larger screen: it features HD-quality video and measures 32 by 55 feet (10 m × 17 m), approximately twice the area of the old display.

== Previous venues ==
Before Washington–Grizzly Stadium, the Grizzlies played off-campus at "new" Dornblaser Field from 1968–86. Prior to 1968, Montana played on-campus at "old" Dornblaser Field from 1920–67 (both named for Paul Dornblaser, football captain in 1912, killed in World War I). The old field was at the site of the Mansfield Library.

Prior to 1920, Montana played its home games at a field in downtown Missoula, near the former Missoulian newspaper building.

== Largest attendance ==
Washington–Grizzly stadium attendance records Official stadium capacity: 25,203
	Attendance	Result	Date
1	27,340	Montana 28, Montana State 31	Nov. 22, 2025
2	27,178	Montana 37, Montana State 7	Nov. 18, 2023
3	27,025	Montana 41, Idaho 30	Sept. 27, 2025
4	26,978	Montana 17, Ferris State 10	Sept. 16, 2023
5	26,856	Montana 29, Montana State 10	Nov. 29, 2021
6	26,829	Montana 28, Southern Utah 21	Aug. 29, 2026
7	26,678	Montana 28, Idaho State 20	Sep. 30, 2023
8	26,544	Montana 31, North Dakota State 29	Dec. 16, 2023
9	26,508	Montana 25, Montana State 29	Nov. 17, 2018
10	26,492	Montana 24, North Dakota 23	Sept. 13, 2025

== Home records ==
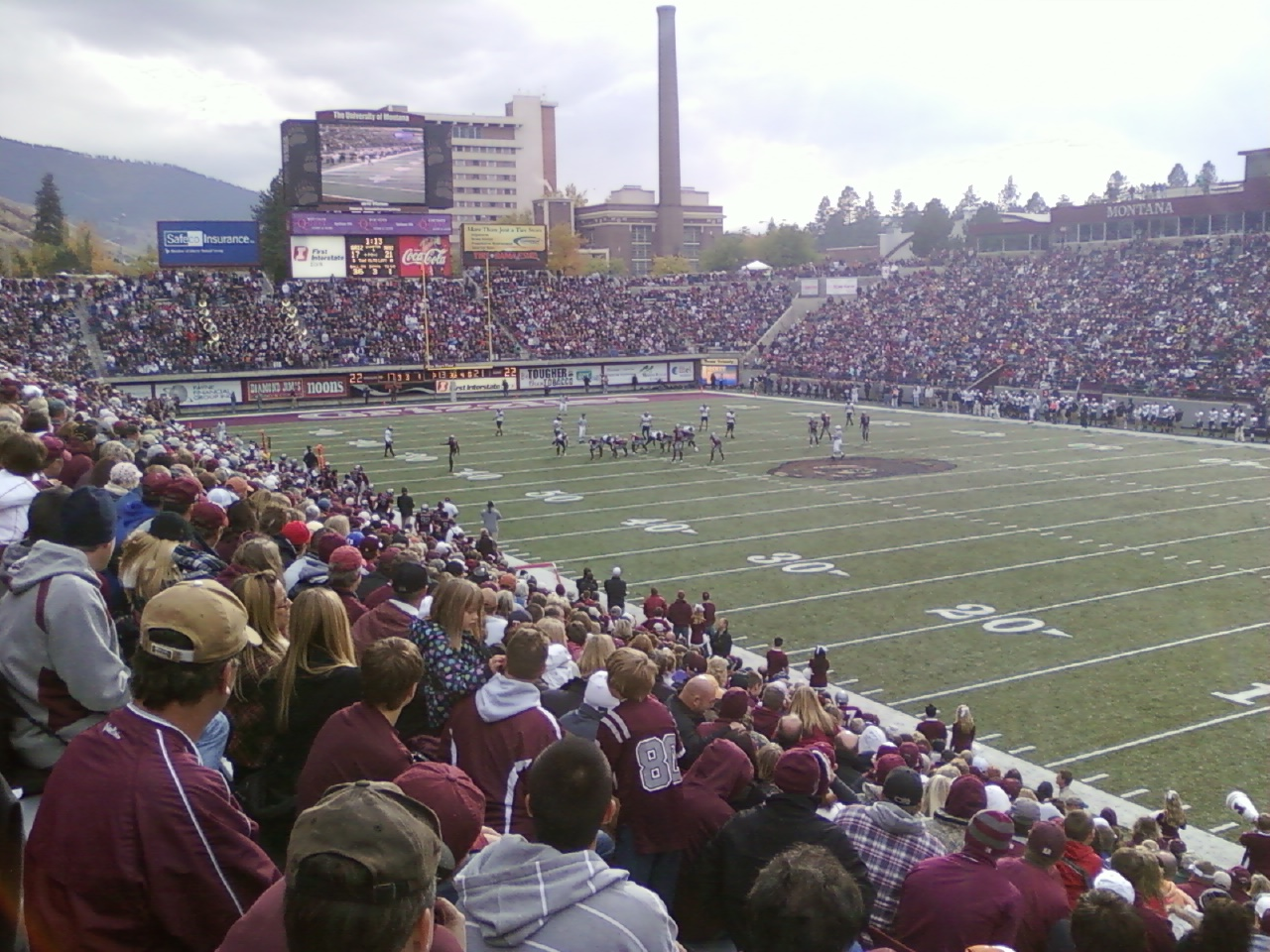
Looking southwest in 2010, against NAU on October 23

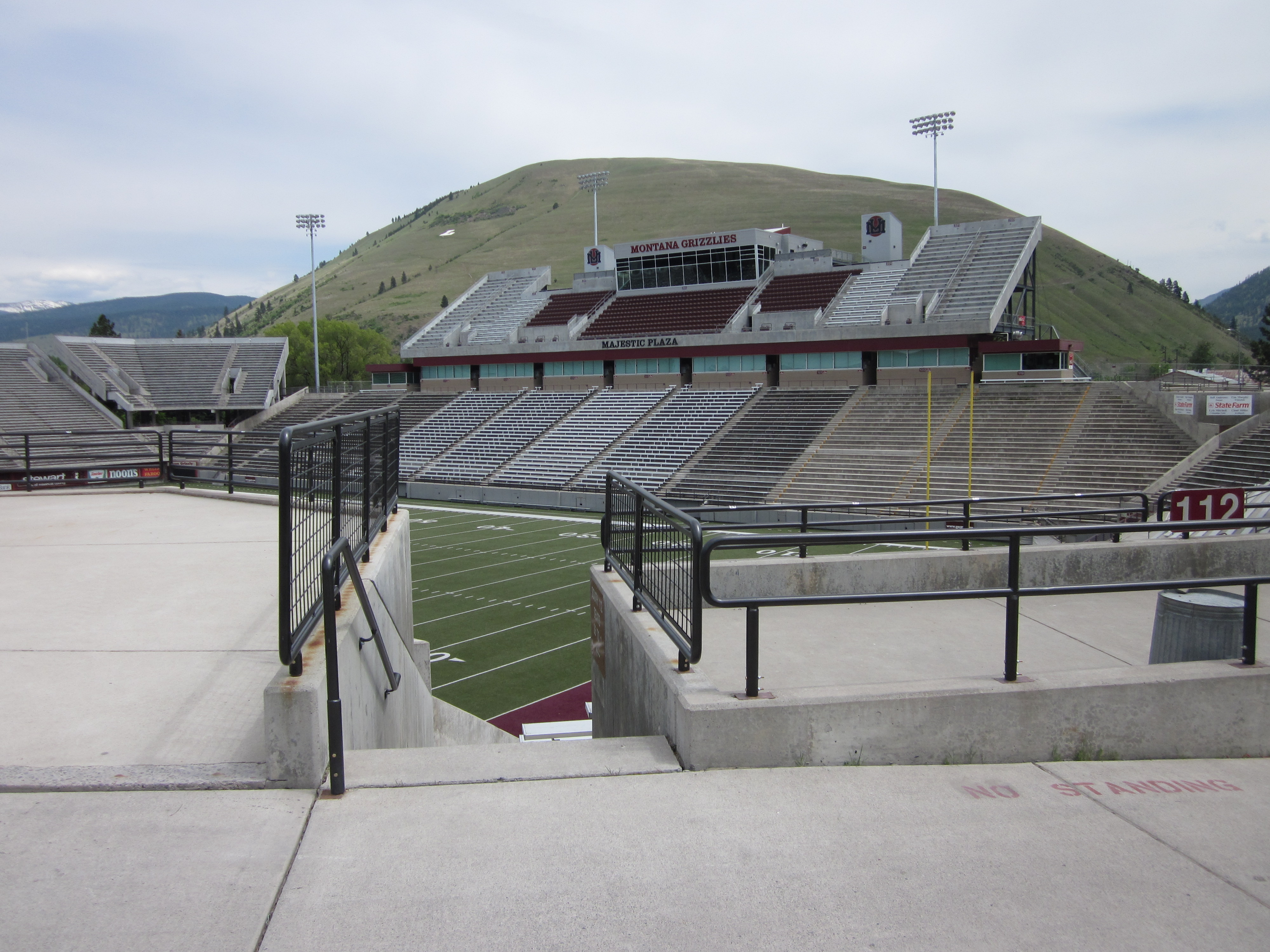
View from southwest corner in 2012, after expansion and lights were added

Year	Win	Loss
Year	W	L
1986	2	1
1987	3	2
1988	6	0
1989^	8	0
1990	4	2
1991	4	1
1992	5	1
1993^	6	1
1994^	9	0
1995^	9	0
1996^	9	0
1997	5	1
1998	5	1
1999^	5	2
2000^	8	1
2001^	9	0
2002^	7	1
2003^	6	2
2004^	10	0
2005^	5	2
2006^	8	1
2007^	7	1
2008^	9	0
2009^	9	0
2010	5	1
2011	6	0
2012	3	3
2013^	5	2
2014^	7	0
2015^	5	2
2016	5	1
2017	5	1
2018	3	3
2019	7	0
2020	2	0
2021	6	1
2022^	6	1
2023^	9	0
2024^	6	2
2025^	9	1
2026	2	0
Total	247–38 (.867)	
^Includes FCS Playoff Game(s)

== Concerts ==
Date	Artist	Opening act(s)	Tour / Concert name	Attendance	Revenue	Notes
May 21, 1988	Smokey Robinson	Rob Quist & Great Northern	Library Benefit	1,700		
June 20, 1998	Pearl Jam	Goodness	Yield Tour	—	—	
October 4, 2006	The Rolling Stones	Black Rebel Motorcycle Club	A Bigger Bang Tour	22,000+	—	This is the band's first-ever concert in the state of Montana.
August 5, 2014	Paul McCartney	—	Out There	25,192 / 25,192	$3,775,111	
August 13, 2018	Pearl Jam	—	Pearl Jam 2018 Tour	23,262 / 23,690	$2,114,194	
August 13, 2021	Guns N' Roses	Mammoth WVH	Guns N' Roses 2020 Tour	15,500 / 18,000	$1,602,149	
August 22, 2024	Pearl Jam	Glen Hansard	Dark Matter World Tour	25,326 / 25,326	$3,932,418	
August 24, 2024	Tyler Childers	Nathaniel Rateliff	Mule Pull '24			
August 28, 2024	Pink	Sheryl Crow; KidCutUp; The Script	P!NK: Summer Carnival	26,440 / 26,440	$5,569,516	
July 2, 2025	Shania Twain	Kip Moore; Lindsay Ell	Live in Concert			
July 21, 2026	Post Malone	Jelly Roll Carter Faith	BIG ASS Stadium Tour Part 2			
August 1, 2026	Luke Bryan; Jason Aldean	Chase Matthew; Lauren Watkins; DJ Rock; Dee Jay Silver	Double Down Tour			

== See also ==
- List of NCAA Division I FCS football stadiums
