= 2018 North Dakota Fighting Hawks football team =

American college football season

2018 North Dakota Fighting Hawks football
- Conference: Independent
- Record: 6–5
- Head coach: Bubba Schweigert (5th season)
- Offensive coordinator: Paul Rudolph (5th season)
- Offensive scheme: Pistol
- Defensive coordinator: Eric Schmidt (5th season)
- Base defense: 3–4
- Home stadium: Alerus Center

2018 NCAA Division I FCS independents football standings
	Conf.			Overall
Team	W		L	W		L
North Alabama		–		7	–	3
Hampton		–		7	–	3
North Dakota		–		6	–	5

The 2018 North Dakota Fighting Hawks football team represented the University of North Dakota during the 2018 NCAA Division I FCS football season. They were led by fifth-year head coach Bubba Schweigert and played their home games at the Alerus Center. The Fighting Hawks competed as an FCS independent. They finished the season 6–5.

North Dakota left the Big Sky Conference for all sports except football in 2018 and join the Summit League. The football program joined the Missouri Valley Football Conference in 2020. Although being classified as an independent for football in 2018 and 2019, the Fighting Hawks continued to play a full Big Sky schedule, and their game counted in the conference standings for their opponents, North Dakota was ineligible to win the conference championship.

== Schedule ==
Date	Time	Opponent	Rank	Site	TV	Result	Attendance
August 30	6:00 p.m.	Mississippi Valley State		Alerus Center; Grand Forks, ND	Midco SN	W 35–7	8,884
September 8	4:00 p.m.	at No. 9 (FBS) Washington		Husky Stadium; Seattle, WA	P12N	L 3–45	68,093
September 15	6:00 p.m.	at No. 5 Sam Houston State		Bowers Stadium; Huntsville, TX	ESPN3	W 24–23	5,373
September 22	4:30 p.m.	Idaho State^{†}	No. 22	Alerus Center; Grand Forks, ND	Midco SN	L 21–25	11,157
September 29	1:00 p.m.	at Northern Colorado		Nottingham Field; Greeley, CO	Pluto TV 241	W 38–13	4,902
October 13	1:00 p.m.	No. 22 Montana		Alerus Center; Grand Forks, ND	Midco SN	W 41–14	10,497
October 20	8:00 p.m.	at Sacramento State		Hornet Stadium; Sacramento, CA	Pluto TV 233	W 41–15	10,709
October 27	2:00 p.m.	No. 4 Weber State	No. 22	Alerus Center; Grand Forks, ND	Midco SN	L 30–35	8,650
November 3	4:00 p.m.	at Idaho		Kibbie Dome; Moscow, ID	Pluto TV 242	L 27–31	7,899
November 10	2:00 p.m.	Portland State		Alerus Center; Grand Forks, ND	Midco SN	W 17–10	7,494
November 17	3:30 p.m.	at Northern Arizona		Walkup Skydome; Flagstaff, AZ	Pluto TV 239	L 16–31	4,306
^{†}Homecoming; Rankings from STATS Poll released prior to the game; All times are in Central time

== Game summaries ==
=== Mississippi Valley State ===
	1	2	3	4	Total
Delta Devils	0	7	0	0	7
Fighting Hawks	14	7	7	7	35

=== At Washington ===
North Dakota at Washington – Game summary

Quarter	1	2	3	4	Total
Fighting Hawks	0	0	3	0	3
No. 9 (FBS) Huskies	10	7	7	21	45

at Husky Stadium • Seattle, WA

- Date: September 8, 2018
- Game time: 2:00 p.m. PDT
- Game weather: 69 °F (21 °C) • Overcast • Wind SE @ 6 mph (10 km/h)
- Game attendance: 68,093
- Referee: Chris Wiggins
- TV announcers (P12N): Ted Robinson, Yogi Roth, and Jill Savage

Game information

Top passers

- UND – Nate Ketteringham: 16/30, 96 yards
- UW – Jake Browning: 23/37, 313 yards, two touchdowns, two interceptions

Top rushers

- UND – John Santiago: 18 attempts, 139 yards
- UW – Myles Gaskin: 15 attempts, 53 yards, one touchdown

Top receiving

- UND – Noah Manzek: 3 receptions, 23 yards
- UW – Quinten Pounds: 3 receptions, 98 yards

=== At Sam Houston State ===
	1	2	3	4	Total
Fighting Hawks	7	10	0	7	24
No. 5 Bearkats	7	3	13	0	23

=== Idaho State ===
	1	2	3	4	Total
Bengals	6	13	0	6	25
No. 22 Fighting Hawks	14	7	0	0	21

=== At Northern Colorado ===
	1	2	3	4	Total
Fighting Hawks	3	21	0	14	38
Bears	0	7	0	6	13

=== Montana ===
	1	2	3	4	Total
No. 22 Grizzlies	7	0	0	7	14
Fighting Hawks	14	13	7	7	41

=== At Sacramento State ===
	1	2	3	4	Total
Fighting Hawks	14	0	20	7	41
Hornets	3	7	5	0	15

=== Weber State ===
	1	2	3	4	Total
No. 4 Wildcats	7	14	7	7	35
No. 22 Fighting Hawks	0	20	3	7	30

=== At Idaho ===
	1	2	3	4	Total
Fighting Hawks	7	7	6	7	27
Vandals	14	0	0	17	31

=== Portland State ===
	1	2	3	4	Total
Vikings	0	3	7	0	10
Fighting Hawks	7	0	0	10	17

=== At Northern Arizona ===
	1	2	3	4	Total
Fighting Hawks	0	10	3	3	16
Lumberjacks	14	3	7	7	31

== Ranking movements ==
Ranking movements Legend: ██ Increase in ranking ██ Decrease in ranking — = Not ranked RV = Received votes
	Week													
Poll	Pre	1	2	3	4	5	6	7	8	9	10	11	12	Final
STATS FCS	RV	RV	RV	22	RV	RV	RV	RV	22	RV	RV	RV		
Coaches	—	—	—	RV	—	—	RV	RV	24	25	RV	25		
