= 2018 Prairie View A&M Panthers football team =

American college football season

2018 Prairie View A&M Panthers football
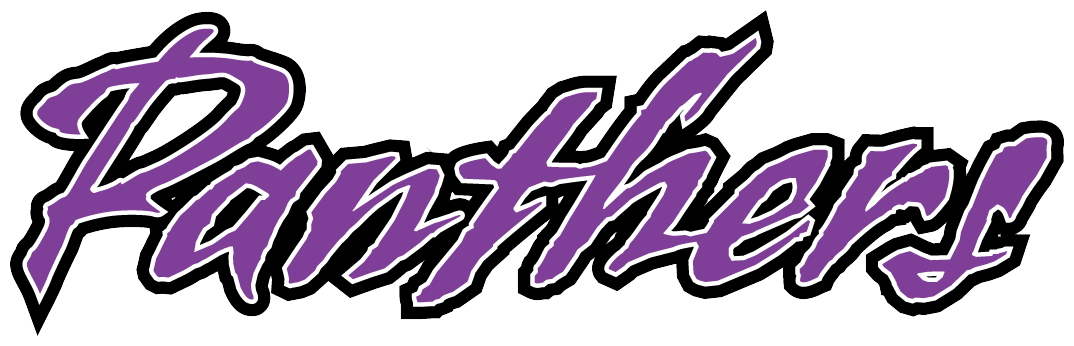
- Conference: Southwestern Athletic Conference
- West Division
- Record: 5–6 (4–3 SWAC)
- Head coach: Eric Dooley (1st season)
- Offensive coordinator: Ted White (1st season)
- Defensive coordinator: Henry Miller (1st season)
- Home stadium: Panther Stadium at Blackshear Field

2018 Southwestern Athletic Conference football standings
	Conf.			Overall
Team	W		L	W		L
East Division
Alcorn State x$	6	–	1	9	–	4
Alabama A&M	5	–	2	6	–	5
Jackson State	4	–	3	5	–	5
Alabama State	3	–	4	4	–	7
Mississippi Valley State	1	–	6	1	–	10
West Division
Southern xy	6	–	1	7	–	4
Grambling State	4	–	3	6	–	5
Prairie View A&M	4	–	3	5	–	6
Texas Southern	1	–	6	2	–	9
Arkansas–Pine Bluff	1	–	6	2	–	9
Championship: Alcorn State 37, Southern 28
$ – Conference champion; x – Division champion/co-champions; y – Championship game participant

The 2018 Prairie View A&M Panthers football team represented Prairie View A&M University in the 2018 NCAA Division I FCS football season. The Panthers were led by first-year head coach Eric Dooley and played their home games at Panther Stadium at Blackshear Field in Prairie View, Texas as members of the West Division of the Southwestern Athletic Conference (SWAC).

== Preseason ==
=== SWAC football media day ===
During the SWAC football media day held in Birmingham, Alabama on July 13, 2018, the Panthers were predicted to finish third in the West Division.

=== Presason All-SWAC Team ===
The Panthers had seven players selected to Preseason All-SWAC Teams.

==== Offense ====
1st team

Corbin Finlayson – Sr. OL

2nd team

Dawonya Tucker – Sr. RB

Roderick Smith – Sr. OL

Markcus Hardy – Sr. WR

Zarrian Holcombe – Sr. TE

==== Defense ====
1st team

Ju’Anthony Parker – Sr. DB

2nd team

Reggie Stubblefield – Sr. DB

== Schedule ==
Date	Time	Opponent	Site	TV	Result	Attendance
August 25	6:00 p.m.	at Rice*	Rice Stadium; Houston, TX	ESPN+	L 28–31	20,050
September 2	11:00 a.m.	vs. North Carolina Central*	Georgia State Stadium; Atlanta, GA (MEAC/SWAC Challenge)	ESPN2	W 40–24	10,274
September 8	6:00 p.m.	at No. 4 Sam Houston State*	Bowers Stadium; Huntsville, TX	ESPN+	L 32–41	9,571
September 15	9:00 p.m.	at UNLV*	Sam Boyd Stadium; Whitney, NV	MW Net	L 17–46	14,786
September 22	6:00 p.m.	at Arkansas–Pine Bluff	Golden Lion Stadium; Pine Bluff, AR		W 62–13	2,675
September 29	4:00 p.m.	vs. Grambling State	Cotton Bowl; Dallas, TX (State Fair Classic)		W 22–16	47,921
October 13	5:00 p.m.	Southern	Panther Stadium at Blackshear Field; Prairie View, TX	ESPN3	L 0–38	13,220
October 27	2:00 p.m.	Alcorn State^{†}	Panther Stadium at Blackshear Field; Prairie View, TX		L 13–27	14,250
November 3	2:00 p.m.	at Jackson State	Mississippi Veterans Memorial Stadium; Jackson, MS		L 28–34	21,729
November 17	1:00 p.m.	Alabama State	Panther Stadium at Blackshear Field; Prairie View, TX		W 66–13	3,025
November 24	1:00 p.m.	Texas Southern	Panther Stadium at Blackshear Field; Prairie View, TX (Labor Day Classic)		W 60–14	4,125
*Non-conference game; ^{†}Homecoming; Rankings from STATS Poll released prior to the game; All times are in Central time

== Game summaries ==
=== At Rice ===
	1	2	3	4	Total
Panthers	0	21	7	0	28
Owls	13	6	0	12	31

Scoring summary

Quarter	Time	Drive			Team	Scoring information	Score	
Quarter	Time	Plays	Yards	TOP	Team	Scoring information	PVAM	Rice
1	4:29	14	86	7:52	Rice	Austin Walker 10-yard touchdown run, Jack Fox kick good	0	7
1	1:53	3	44	0:57	Rice	Emmanuel Esukpa 15-yard touchdown run, Jack Fox kick failed	0	13
2	11:03	9	60	4:09	Rice	33-yard field goal by Jack Fox	0	16
2	9:06	6	75	1:57	PVAM	Zarrian Holcomb 20-yard touchdown reception from Jalen Morton, Zach Elder kick good	7	16
2	4:17	10	47	4:49	Rice	36-yard field goal by Haden Tobola	7	19
2	1:33	7	69	2:44	PVAM	Jose Medrano 2-yard touchdown reception from Jalen Morton, Zach Elder kick good	14	19
2	0:06	4	69	0:34	PVAM	Tristen Wallace 20-yard touchdown reception from Jalen Morton, Zach Elder kick good	21	19
3	8:05	8	94	3:04	PVAM	Bernard Good 27-yard touchdown run, Zach Elder kick good	28	19
4	11:46	4	25	1:53	Rice	Austin Walter 8-yard touchdown run, Jack Fox kick good	28	26
4	10:15				Rice	PVAM rush for loss of 31 yards, team safety	28	28
4	0:00	9	52	4:28	Rice	23-yard field goal by Jack Fox	28	31
"TOP" = time of possession. For other American football terms, see Glossary of American football.							28	31

=== vs North Carolina Central ===
	1	2	3	4	Total
Eagles	0	7	14	3	24
Panthers	20	3	3	14	40

=== At Sam Houston State ===
	1	2	3	4	Total
Panthers	9	14	0	9	32
No. 4 Bearkats	10	17	7	7	41

=== At UNLV ===
	1	2	3	4	Total
Panthers	0	0	14	3	17
Rebels	20	14	0	12	46

=== At Arkansas–Pine Bluff ===
	1	2	3	4	Total
Panthers	35	14	6	7	62
Golden Lions	3	7	0	3	13

=== vs Grambling State ===
	1	2	3	4	Total
Tigers	0	2	0	14	16
Panthers	12	3	7	0	22

=== Southern ===
	1	2	3	4	Total
Jaguars	17	7	7	7	38
Panthers	0	0	0	0	0

=== Alcorn State ===
	1	2	3	4	Total
Braves	10	10	0	7	27
Panthers	10	0	0	3	13

=== At Jackson State ===
	1	2	3	4	Total
Panthers	0	7	7	14	28
Tigers	17	7	3	7	34

=== Alabama State ===
	1	2	3	4	Total
Hornets	6	0	7	0	13
Panthers	21	28	7	10	66

=== Texas Southern ===
	1	2	3	4	Total
Tigers	7	7	0	0	14
Panthers	13	27	20	0	60

== Players drafted into the NFL ==
Round	Pick	Player	Position	NFL Club
7	230	Quinton Bell	DE	Oakland Raiders
