= 2018 Alcorn State Braves football team =

American college football season

2018 Alcorn State Braves football

SWAC East Division champion SWAC champion

SWAC Championship Game, W 37–28 vs. Southern

Celebration Bowl, L 22–24 vs. NC A&T
- Conference: Southwestern Athletic Conference
- East Division
- Record: 9–4 (6–1 SWAC)
- Head coach: Fred McNair (3rd season)
- Offensive coordinator: Ryan Stanchek (1st season)
- Offensive scheme: Spread
- Defensive coordinator: Cedric Thornton (1st season)
- Base defense: Multiple 4–2–5
- Home stadium: Casem-Spinks Stadium

2018 Southwestern Athletic Conference football standings
	Conf.			Overall
Team	W		L	W		L
East Division
Alcorn State x$	6	–	1	9	–	4
Alabama A&M	5	–	2	6	–	5
Jackson State	4	–	3	5	–	5
Alabama State	3	–	4	4	–	7
Mississippi Valley State	1	–	6	1	–	10
West Division
Southern xy	6	–	1	7	–	4
Grambling State	4	–	3	6	–	5
Prairie View A&M	4	–	3	5	–	6
Texas Southern	1	–	6	2	–	9
Arkansas–Pine Bluff	1	–	6	2	–	9
Championship: Alcorn State 37, Southern 28
$ – Conference champion; x – Division champion/co-champions; y – Championship game participant

The 2018 Alcorn State Braves football team represented Alcorn State University in the 2018 NCAA Division I FCS football season. The Braves were led by third-year head coach Fred McNair and played their home games at Casem-Spinks Stadium. They were members of the East Division of the Southwestern Athletic Conference (SWAC).

== Preseason ==
=== SWAC football media day ===
During the SWAC football media day held in Birmingham, Alabama on July 13, 2018, the Braves were predicted to win the East Division.

=== Presason All-SWAC Team ===
The Braves had 10 players at 11 positions selected to Preseason All-SWAC Teams which was the second most behind Grambling State's 15. Running back P.J. Simmons was also selected as the preseason offensive player of the year.

Offense

1st team

Noah Johnson – Jr. QB

P.J. Simmons – Sr. RB

Mustaffa Ibrahim – Jr. OL

2nd team

Deonte Brooks – Jr. OL

Kevin Hall – Jr. OL

Defense

1st team

Trae Ferrell – Sr. LB

2nd team

Sterling Shippy – Sr. DL

Solomon Muhammad – Jr. LB

Brady Smith – Sr. DB

Special teams

Corey McCullough – Jr. K/P, selected for both positions

=== Award watch lists ===
Award	Player	Position	Year
Walter Payton Award	P.J. Simmons	RB	SR

== Schedule ==
Date	Time	Opponent	Site	TV	Result	Attendance
September 1	11:30 a.m.	at Georgia Tech*	Bobby Dodd Stadium; Atlanta, GA	ACCRSN	L 0–41	39,719
September 8	6:00 p.m.	Louisiana College*	Casem-Spinks Stadium; Lorman, MS		W 78–0	4,521
September 15	6:00 p.m.	Texas Southern*	Casem-Spinks Stadium; Lorman, MS		W 27–15	14,563
September 22	6:00 p.m.	at Mississippi Valley State	Rice–Totten Stadium; Itta Bena, MS		W 56–20	N/A
September 29	6:00 p.m.	at Southern	Ace W. Mumford Stadium; Baton Rouge, LA		W 20–3	19,412
October 6	2:00 p.m.	Alabama State^{†}	Casem-Spinks Stadium; Lorman, MS		L 25–28 ^{5OT}	19,445
October 13	2:00 p.m.	at Alabama A&M	Louis Crews Stadium; Huntsville, AL		W 35–26	19,126
October 20	2:00 p.m.	Grambling State	Casem-Spinks Stadium; Lorman, MS	ESPN3	W 33–26	10,610
October 27	2:00 p.m.	at Prairie View A&M	Panther Stadium at Blackshear Field; Prairie View, TX		W 27–13	14,250
November 3	3:00 p.m.	at New Mexico State*	Aggie Memorial Stadium; Las Cruces, NM		L 42–52	11,897
November 17	2:00 p.m.	Jackson State	Casem-Spinks Stadium; Lorman, MS		W 24–3	21,312
December 1	3:30 p.m.	Southern	Spinks-Casem Stadium; Lorman, MS (SWAC Championship Game)	ESPNU	W 37–28	20,652
December 15	11:00 a.m.	vs. No. 11 North Carolina A&T*	Mercedes-Benz Stadium; Atlanta, GA (Celebration Bowl)	ABC	L 22–24	31,672
*Non-conference game; ^{†}Homecoming; Rankings from STATS Poll released prior to the game; All times are in Central time

- Source: Schedule

Despite also being a member of the SWAC, the game vs Texas Southern will be considered a non conference game and will have no effect on the SWAC standings.

== Game summaries ==
=== At Georgia Tech ===
	1	2	3	4	Total
Braves	0	0	0	0	0
Yellow Jackets	7	13	21	0	41

=== Louisiana College ===
	1	2	3	4	Total
Wildcats	0	0	0	0	0
Braves	27	24	14	13	78

=== Texas Southern ===
	1	2	3	4	Total
Tigers	0	0	7	8	15
Braves	14	13	0	0	27

=== At Mississippi Valley State ===
	1	2	3	4	Total
Braves	10	17	14	15	56
Delta Devils	7	0	7	6	20

=== At Southern ===
	1	2	3	4	Total
Braves	0	3	14	3	20
Jaguars	0	0	3	0	3

=== Alabama State ===
	1	2	3	4	OT	Total
Hornets	14	0	0	0	14	28
Braves	7	0	0	7	11	25

=== At Alabama A&M ===
	1	2	3	4	Total
Braves	3	7	22	3	35
Bulldogs	3	7	8	8	26

=== Grambling State ===
	1	2	3	4	Total
Tigers	13	0	10	3	26
Braves	7	16	0	10	33

=== At Prairie View A&M ===
	1	2	3	4	Total
Braves	10	10	0	7	27
Panthers	10	0	0	3	13

=== At New Mexico State ===
	1	2	3	4	Total
Braves	7	7	7	21	42
Aggies	14	21	3	14	52

=== Jackson State ===
	1	2	3	4	Total
Tigers	0	3	0	0	3
Braves	0	3	14	7	24
