= 2018 Southern Jaguars football team =

American college football season

2018 Southern Jaguars football
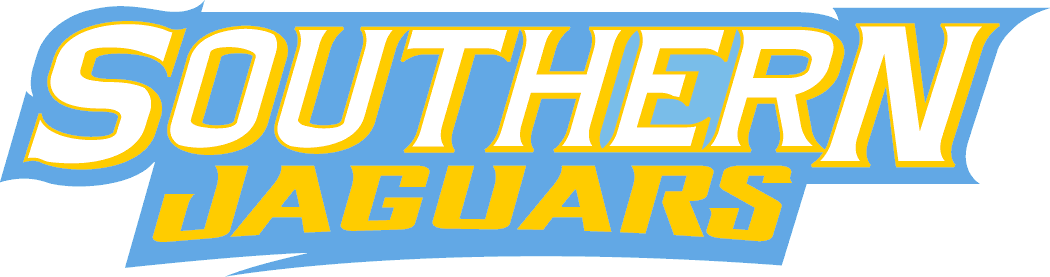

SWAC West Division champion

SWAC Championship Game, L 28–37 vs. Alcorn State
- Conference: Southwestern Athletic Conference
- West Division
- Record: 7–4 (6–1 SWAC)
- Head coach: Dawson Odums (6th season)
- Offensive coordinator: Chennis Berry (6th season)
- Defensive coordinator: Trei Oliver (3rd season)
- Home stadium: Ace W. Mumford Stadium

2018 Southwestern Athletic Conference football standings
	Conf.			Overall
Team	W		L	W		L
East Division
Alcorn State x$	6	–	1	9	–	4
Alabama A&M	5	–	2	6	–	5
Jackson State	4	–	3	5	–	5
Alabama State	3	–	4	4	–	7
Mississippi Valley State	1	–	6	1	–	10
West Division
Southern xy	6	–	1	7	–	4
Grambling State	4	–	3	6	–	5
Prairie View A&M	4	–	3	5	–	6
Texas Southern	1	–	6	2	–	9
Arkansas–Pine Bluff	1	–	6	2	–	9
Championship: Alcorn State 37, Southern 28
$ – Conference champion; x – Division champion/co-champions; y – Championship game participant

The 2018 Southern Jaguars football team represented Southern University in the 2018 NCAA Division I FCS football season. The Jaguars were led by sixth-year head coach Dawson Odums and played their home games at Ace W. Mumford Stadium in Baton Rouge, Louisiana as members of the West Division of the Southwestern Athletic Conference (SWAC).

== Preseason ==
=== SWAC football media day ===
During the SWAC football media day held in Birmingham, Alabama on July 13, 2018, the Jaguars were predicted to finish second in the West Division.

=== Presason All-SWAC Team ===
The Jaguars had two players at four positions selected to Preseason All-SWAC Teams.

==== Offense ====
1st team

Jerimiah Abby – Jr. OL

==== Defense ====
1st team

Andrea Augustine – Sr. DB

== Roster ==
2018 Southern Jaguars football team roster
Players
Coaches
Offense

Pos.	#	Name	Class
WR	4	Hunter Register	So
WR	6	Jamar Washington	So
QB	7	Kobe Lain	Jr
QB	8	Ladarius Skelton	So
RB	9	Devon Benn	So
WR	10	Kendall Catalon	So
QB	11	John Lampley	So
QB	12	Glendon McDaniel	So
RB	15	Darbbeon Profit	So
RB	20	Jamarqueza Mims	Jr
WR	21	Trey Smith	Sr
RB	24	Carlos Stephens	So
WR	25	Cameron Mackey	So
RB	27	Shontega Thomas	Fr
WR	28	Christopher Chaney	So
RB	32	Maliek Stephens	Jr
TE	35	Reggie Wilson	Fr
RB	39	Jordan Davis	Jr
QB	43	DJ White	Fr
TE	45	Austin Opara	Sr
OL	58	Jaylon Brinson	Jr
OL	60	Bernard Childs	Fr
OL	62	Dallas Black	Fr
OL	64	Jerimiah Abby	Jr
OL	65	Johnathan Bishop	So
OL	66	Mason Sims	Jr
OL	67	August Walker	So
OL	68	David Odendahl	So
OL	69	Elijah Jordan	So
OL	70	Kennedy Madison	Fr
OL	71	Maurice Campbell	So
OL	74	Garrick Breaux	Fr
OT	75	Briana Williams	So
OL	77	Jodeci Harris	Jr
OL	78	J'Atrye Carter	So
WR	80	Norman Price	Fr
WR	81	Christian Branch	So
TE	82	Dennis Craig	Sr
WR	83	Jamel Byrd	Fr
WR	84	Kobe Hartman	Fr
WR	86	Daelon Richardson	Sr
WR	87	Randall Menard	Sr
TE	88	Jeremias Houston	Jr
WR	89	Tyler Brown	Jr

Defense

Pos.	#	Name	Class
DB	2	Timothy Thompson	Sr
DB	3	Elijah Small	Jr
DB	5	Montavius Gaines	Jr
DB	13	Arvin Huff	Sr
DB	14	Demerio Houston	Sr
DB	16	Kaycee Ntukogu	So
DB	17	Andre Augustine	Sr
LB	18	Benjamin Harris	Jr
DB	19	Elijah Allen	Sr
DB	22	Glen Brown, III	Fr
DB	23	Chase Foster	So
DB	26	Torriando Sims, II	Fr
DB	29	Robert Rhem	Fr
S	31	Jakobi Jones	So
DB	33	Jakoby Pappillion	So
LB	34	Keyshawn Akers	So
S	37	Kordell Caldwell	So
LB	38	Caleb Scott	Fr
LB	40	Jordan Williams	Jr
DT	41	Simeon Houston	Sr
DL	42	Joe Davis	Jr
LB	44	Alfred Palomino	Sr
LB	46	Darrell Hardnett	So
LB	47	Caleb Carter	Jr
LB	48	Darrell Lewis	Jr
LB	49	Brad Porter	Sr
LB	50	Kyle McGregor	Jr
LB	51	Jordan Lewis	Fr
LB	52	Calvin Lunkins	Jr
DE	53	Jahmal Tillman	Jr
DL	54	Jaron Johnson	Jr
LB	55	Kennen Tate	Fr
DL	56	Desnic Snow	Fr
LB	57	Landon Auzenne	So
LB	58	Jordan Bennett	So
DL	59	Christopher Jones	Jr
DL	79	Jamil Abdul-aziz	So
DL	90	Dylan Walker	So
DT	91	Dakavion Champion	Jr
DL	92	Colyn Givens	Fr
DL	93	CeaJae Bryant	Jr
DL	94	Christopher Thomas	Fr
DL	95	Tyran Nash	Jr
LB	96	Jalen Ivy	So
DL	96	Robert Square III	Fr
DL	98	Chad Brown	Fr
DT	99	Hunter Clay	So

Special teams

Pos.	#	Name	Class
K	30	Cesar Barajas	So
K	36	Martel Fontenot	Fr
LS	61	Beau Badon	Fr
LS	72	Sean Beauchamp	Fr
K/P	85	Taylor Merritt	Jr

Head coach

- Dawson Odums (North Carolina Central)

Coordinators/assistant coaches

- Chennis Berry (Savannah State)
  Offensive coordinator, offensive line
- Lionel Washington (Tulane)
  Defensive coordinator, cornerbacks
- Wayne Cordova (McNeese State)
  Safeties
- Macander Dieudonne (Webber International)
  Tight ends
- Chris Coleman (North Carolina State)
  Wide receivers
- Skyler Jones (Southern)
  Defensive line
- Matt Leone (Webber International)
  Quarterbacks
- Ashton Warner (Bethany)
  Running backs

Legend

- (C) Team captain
- (S) Suspended
- (I) Ineligible
- Injured
- Redshirt

Roster
Last update: April 27, 2019

== Schedule ==
Date	Time	Opponent	Site	TV	Result	Attendance
September 1	11:00 a.m.	at No. 16 (FBS) TCU*	Amon G. Carter Stadium; Fort Worth, TX	FSN	L 7–55	42,219
September 8	6:00 p.m.	at Louisiana Tech*	Joe Aillet Stadium; Ruston, LA	ESPN+	L 17–54	22,926
September 15	6:00 p.m.	Langston*	Ace W. Mumford Stadium; Baton Rouge, LA		W 33–18 (Note: This game was called late in the third quarter due to lightning with Southern declared the winner.)	12,379
September 22	4:00 p.m.	vs. Alabama A&M	Ladd–Peebles Stadium; Mobile, AL (Gulf Coast Challenge)		W 29–27	20,000
September 29	6:00 p.m.	Alcorn State^{†}	Ace W. Mumford Stadium; Baton Rouge, LA	ESPN3	L 3–20	19,412
October 13	5:00 p.m.	at Prairie View A&M	Panther Stadium at Blackshear Field; Prairie View, TX	ESPN3	W 38–0	1,154
October 20	2:00 p.m.	vs. Texas Southern	Cotton Bowl; Dallas, TX (State Fair Showdown)		W 21–7	17,105
October 27	6:00 p.m.	Jackson State	Ace W. Mumford Stadium; Baton Rouge, LA		W 41–7	20,575
November 10	4:00 p.m.	Arkansas–Pine Bluff	Ace W. Mumford Stadium; Baton Rouge, LA		W 56–24	18,060
November 24	4:00 p.m.	vs. Grambling State	Mercedes-Benz Superdome; New Orleans, LA (Bayou Classic)	NBCSN	W 38–28	67,871
December 1	3:30 p.m.	at Alcorn State	Casem-Spinks Stadium; Lorman, MS (SWAC Championship Game)	ESPNU	L 28–37	20,652
*Non-conference game; ^{†}Homecoming; Rankings from STATS Poll released prior to the game; All times are in Central time

== Game summaries ==
=== At TCU ===
Southern at TCU – Game summary

Quarter	1	2	3	4	Total
Jaguars	0	7	0	0	7
No. 16 Horned Frogs	17	21	17	0	55

at Amon G. Carter Stadium, Fort Worth, TX

- Date: September 1
- Game time: 11:00 a.m. CST
- Game weather: 89 °F (32 °C); sunny and clear
- Game attendance: 42,219
- Referee: Cal McNeil
- TV: FSN

Game information

First quarter

- TCU – Cole Bunce 26-yard field goal, 12:36 (TCU 3–0)
- TCU – Shawn Robinson 36-yard TD run, Bunce kick good, 8:46 (TCU 10–0)
- TCU – Derius Davis 12-yard TD pass from Robinson, Bunce kick good, 5:04 (TCU 17–0)

Second quarter

- TCU – Taye Barber 6-yard TD pass from Robinson, Bunce kick good, 12:06 (TCU 24–0)
- TCU – Robinson 9-yard TD run, Bunce kick good, 8:22 (TCU 31–0)
- SOU – Cameron Mackey 55-yard TD pass from John Lampley, Cesar Barajas kick good, 6:34 (TCU 31–7)
- TCU – Jalen Reagor 12-yard TD pass from Robinson, Bunce kick good, 4:20 (TCU 38–7)

Third quarter

- TCU – Bunce 30-yard field goal, 10:54 (TCU 41–7)
- TCU – TreVontae Hights 57-yard TD pass from Michael Collins, Jonathan Song kick good, 9:48 (TCU 48–7)
- TCU – Davis 73-yard punt returned for TD, Song kick good, 7:31 (TCU 55–7)

Top passers

- TCU – Shawn Robinson – 17/24, 182 yards, 3 TD
- SOU – John Lampley – 5/14, 101 yards, TD, 2 INT

Top rushers

- TCU – Emari Demercado – 8 carries, 57 yards
- SOU – Carlos Stephens – 7 carries, 25 yards

Top receivers

- TCU – TreVontae Hights – reception, 57 yards, TD
- SOU – Cameron Mackey – 3 receptions, 56 yards, TD

=== At Louisiana Tech ===
Southern at Louisiana Tech – Game summary

Quarter	1	2	3	4	Total
Jaguars	7	7	3	0	17
Bulldogs	21	10	14	9	54

at Joe Aillet Stadium, Ruston, LA

- Date: September 8
- Game time: 6:00 p.m. CST
- Game weather: 82 °F (28 °C); cloudy
- Game attendance: 22,926
- Referee: Justin Elliott

Game information

First quarter

- LT – Israel Tucker 1-yard TD run, Bailey Hale kick good, 11:41 (LT 7–0)
- LT – Jaqwis Dancy 25-yard TD run, Hale kick good, 10:05 (LT 14–0)
- LT – J'Mar Smith 19-yard TD run, Hale kick good, 5:22 (LT 21–0)
- SOU – Kendall Catalon 38-yard TD pass from John Lampley, Cesar Barajas kick good, 1:24 (LT 21–7)

Second quarter

- SOU – Lampley 1-yard TD run, Barajas kick good, 10:59 (LT 21–14)
- LT – Rhashid Bonnette 17-yard TD pass from Smith, Hale kick good, 9:02 (LT 28–14)
- LT – Hale 24-yard field goal, 0:05 (LT 31–14)

Third quarter

- SOU – Barajas 22-yard field goal, 8:15 (LT 31–17)
- LT – Dancy 32-yard TD run, Hale kick good, 7:12 (LT 38–17)
- LT – Smoke Harris 34-yard TD pass from Smith, Hale kick good, 0:00 (LT 45–17)

Fourth quarter

- LT – Team Safety, 5:30 (LT 47–17)
- LT – Harris 30-yard TD pass from Aaron Allen, Hale kick good, 0:06 (LT 54–17)

Top passers

- LT – J'Mar Smith – 24/37, 380 yards, 2 TD
- SOU – John Lampley – 17/24, 179 yards, TD

Top rushers

- LT – Jaqwis Dancy – 5 carries, 67 yards, 2 TD
- SOU – Devon Benn – 15 carries, 53 yards

Top receivers

- LT – Adrian Hardy – 6 receptions, 111 yards
- SOU – Kendall Catalon – 6 receptions, 89 yards, TD

=== Langston ===
Langston at Southern – Game summary

Quarter	1	2	3	Total
Lions	6	6	6	18
Jaguars	7	12	14	33

at A. W. Mumford Stadium, Baton Rouge, LA

- Date: September 15
- Game time: 7:00 p.m. CST
- Game weather: 85 °F (29 °C); partly cloudy and rainy
- Game attendance: 15,165
- Referee: Gary Leeper

Game information

First quarter

- SOU – Trey Smith 24-yard TD pass from John Lampley, Cesar Barajas kick good, 4:41 (SOU 7–0)
- LANG – Char Harvin III 35-yard TD run, Jaylen Lowe kick no good, 1:19 (SOU 7–6)

Second quarter

- LANG – Tim Whitfield 1-yard TD run, Lowe kick no good, 9:30 (LANG 12–7)
- SOU – Kendall Catalon 41-yard TD pass from Glendon McDaniel, Barajas kick no good, 4:15 (SOU 13–12)
- SOU – Catalon 10-yard TD pass from Lampley, Barajas kick no good, 0:33 (SOU 19–12)

Third quarter

- LANG – Michael Colston 4-yard TD pass from Lowe, Lowe two-point conversion pass attempt no good, 7:03 (SOU 19–18)
- SOU – Smith 45-yard TD pass from Lampley, Martell Fontenot kick good, 5:58 (SOU 26–18)
- SOU – Catalon 4-yard TD run, Fontenot kick good, 1:07 (SOU 33–18)

Top passers

- SOU – John Lampley – 9/15, 121 yards, 3 TD
- LANG – Jaylen Lowe – 14/24, 179 yards, TD, INT

Top rushers

- SOU – John Lampley – 14 carries, 132 yards
- LANG – Char Harvin III – 2 carries, 35 yards, TD

Top receivers

- SOU – Trey Smith – 3 receptions, 79 yards, 2 TD
- LANG – Isaiah Shaputis – 6 receptions, 57 yards

- This game was called late in the 3rd quarter due to lightning with Southern declared the winner.

=== vs Alabama A&M ===
Alabama A&M vs. Southern – Game summary

Quarter	1	2	3	4	Total
Jaguars	6	9	14	0	29
Bulldogs	21	0	0	6	27

at Ladd-Peebles Stadium, Mobile, AL

- Date: September 22
- Game time: 4:00 p.m. CST
- Game weather: 86 °F (30 °C); mostly cloudy
- Game attendance: 20,000

Game information

First quarter

- SOU – Dennis Craig 10-yard TD pass from John Lampley, Cesar Barajas kick no good, 9:34 (SOU 6–0)
- AAMU – Jordan Bentley 49-yard TD run, Spencer Corey kick good, 7:54 (AAMU 7–6)
- AAMU – Kendric Johnson 36-yard TD pass from Aqeel Glass, Corey kick good, 5:43 (AAMU 14–6)
- AAMU – Bentley 17-yard TD pass from Glass, Corey kick good, 1:17 (AAMU 21–6)

Second quarter

- SOU – Team Safety, 5:57 (AAMU 21–8)
- SOU – Devon Benn 11-yard TD pass from Lampley, Martel Fontenot kick good, 0:21 (AAMU 21–15)

Third quarter

- SOU – Benn 2-yard TD run, Fontenot kick good, 8:31 (SOU 22–21)
- SOU – Jarmarqueza Mims 25-yard TD run, Fontenot kick good, 5:06 (SOU 29–21)

Fourth quarter

- AAMU – Glass 2-yard TD run, two-point pass conversion from Glass no good, 1:13 (SOU 29–27)

Top passers

- SOU – John Lampley – 24/38, 204 yards, 2 TD, 2 INT
- AAMU – Aqeel Glass – 17/29, 210 yards, 2 TD

Top rushers

- SOU – John Lampley – 21 carries, 99 yards
- AAMU – Jordan Bentley – 15 carries, 96 yards, TD

Top receivers

- SOU – Kendall Catalon – 7 receptions, 52 yards
- AAMU – Kendric Johnson – 2 receptions, 48 yards, TD

=== Alcorn State ===
Alcorn State at Southern – Game summary

Quarter	1	2	3	4	Total
Braves	0	3	14	3	20
Jaguars	0	0	3	0	3

at A. W. Mumford Stadium, Baton Rouge, LA

- Date: September 29
- Game time: 6:00 p.m. CST
- Game weather: 82 °F (28 °C); rain
- Game attendance: 21,412
- Referee: Eddie Kelly
- TV: ESPN3

Game information

Second quarter

- ALCN – Corey McCullough 32-yard field goal, 0:50 (ALCN 3–0)

Third quarter

- ALCN – De'Shawn Waller 1-yard Td run, McCullough kick good, 12:58 (ALCN 10–0)
- SOU – Martell Fontenot 28-yard field goal, 11:11 (ALCN 10–3)
- ALCN – Qwynnterrio Cole 36-yard interception returned for TD, McCullough kick good, 4:14 (ALCN 17–3)

Fourth quarter

- ALCN – McCullough 22-yard field goal, 8:17 (ALCN 20–3)

Top passers

- ALCN – Noah Johnson – 13/22, 138 yards, 2 INT
- SOU – John Lampley – 9/26, 59 yards, INT

Top rushers

- ALCN – Noah Johnson – 11 carries, 81 yards
- SOU – Devon Benn – 21 carries, 60 yards

Top receivers

- ALCN – Chris Blair – 5 receptions, 79 yards
- SOU – Devon Benn – 3 receptions, 20 yards

=== At Prairie View A&M ===
Southern at Prairie View A&M – Game summary

Quarter	1	2	3	4	Total
Jaguars	17	7	7	7	38
Panthers	0	0	0	0	0

at Panther Stadium at Blackshear Field, Prairie View, TX

- Date: October 13
- Game time: 5:00 p.m. CST
- Game weather: 85 °F (29 °C); partly cloudy
- Game attendance: 13,220
- Referee: Vern Breakfield

Game information

First quarter

- SOU – Martell Fontenot 22-yard field goal, 9:58 (SOU 3–0)
- SOU – Ladarius Skelton 2-yard TD run, Fontenot kick good, 6:38 (SOU 10–0)
- SOU – Kendall Catalon 25-yard TD run, Fontenot kick good, 2:04 (SOU 17–0)

Second quarter

- SOU – Skelton 7-yard TD run, Fontenot kick good, 6:43 (SOU 24–0)

Third quarter

- SOU – Trey Smith 5-yard TD pass from Skelton, Fontenot kick good, 12:11 (SOU 31–0)

Fourth quarter

- SOU – Skelton 9-yard TD run, Fontenot kick good, 1:05 (SOU 38–0)

Top passers

- SOU – Ladarius Skelton – 15/26, 168 yards, TD
- PVAMU – Jalen Morton – 20/42, 251 yards, 5 INT

Top rushers

- SOU – Ladarius Skelton – 27 carries, 202 yards, 3 TD
- PVAMU – Jalen Morton – 13 carries, 44 yards

Top receivers

- SOU – Cameron Mackey – 4 receptions, 35 yards
- PVAMU – Zarrian Holcombe – 4 receptions, 59 yards

=== Vs. Texas Southern ===
Southern vs. Texas Southern – Game summary

Quarter	1	2	3	4	Total
Jaguars	17	7	7	7	38
Panthers	0	0	0	0	0

at Cotton Bowl, Dallas, TX

- Date: October 20
- Game time: 2:00 p.m. CST
- Game weather: 64 °F (18 °C); sunny
- Game attendance: 32,143
- Referee: Marty Adams

Game information

First quarter

- SOU – Carlos Stephens punt block returned for 17-yard TD, Martell Fontenot kick good, 14:00 (SOU 7–0)
- SOU – Ladarius Skelton 4-yard TD run, Fontenot kick good, 9:30 (SOU 14–0)

Third quarter

- SOU – Trey Smith 17-yard TD pass from John Lampley, Fontenot kick good, 2:04 (SOU 21–0)

Fourth quarter

- TXSO – Adrian Carter 6-yard TD pass from Jay Christophe, Aaron Cuevas kick good, 8:52 (SOU 21–7)

Top passers

- SOU – Ladarius Skelton – 8/22, 74 yards, INT
- TXSO – Jay Christophe – 6/17, 83 yards, TD

Top rushers

- SOU – Devon Benn – 16 carries, 81 yards
- TXSO – Tylor Cook – 10 carries, 40 yards

Top receivers

- SOU – Trey Smith – 3 receptions, 37 yards, TD
- TXSO – Tren'Davian Dickson – 3 receptions, 73 yards

=== Jackson State ===
Jackson State at Southern – Game summary

Quarter	1	2	3	4	Total
Tigers	0	0	7	0	7
Jaguars	14	7	20	0	41

at A. W. Mumford Stadium, Baton Rouge, LA

- Date: October 27
- Game time: 6:00 p.m. CST
- Game weather: 70 °F (21 °C); sunny
- Game attendance: 20,575
- Referee: John Allmond

Game information

First quarter

- SOU – Ladarius Skelton 15-yard TD run, Martell Fontenot kick good, 9:36 (SOU 7–0)
- SOU – Trey Smith 27-yard TD pass from Skelton, Fontenot kick good, 2:17 (SOU 14–0)

Second quarter

- Demerio Houston 42-yard fumble returned for TD, Fontenot kick good, 8:57 (SOU 21–0)

Third quarter

- JSU – Warren Newman 42-yard punt returned for TD, Christian Jacquemin kick good, 9:52 (SOU 21–7)
- SOU – Shontego Thomas 92-yard kickoff returned for TD, Fontenot kick good, 9:40 (SOU 28–7)
- SOU – Fontenot 31-yard field goal, 8:37 (SOU 31–7)
- SOU – Fontenot 42-yard field goal, 5:22 (SOU 34–7)
- SOU – Jordan Lewis 36-yard fumble returned for TD, Cesar Barajas kick good, 1:22 (SOU 41–7)

Top passers

- SOU – Ladarius Skelton – 5/14, 61 yards, TD
- JSU – Derrick Ponder – 9/20, 99 yards

Top rushers

- SOU – Ladarius Skelton – 13 carries, 89 yards, TD
- JSU – Jordan Johnson – 7 carries, 20 yards

Top receivers

- SOU – Trey Smith – 2 receptions, 38 yards, TD
- JSU – Cameron Hines – 3 receptions, 57 yards

=== Arkansas–Pine Bluff ===
Arkansas-Pine Bluff at Southern – Game summary

Quarter	1	2	3	4	Total
Golden Lions	6	3	8	7	24
Jaguars	21	21	14	0	56

at A. W. Mumford Stadium, Baton Rouge, LA

- Date: November 10
- Game time: 4:00 p.m. CST
- Game weather: 54 °F (12 °C); partly cloudy
- Game attendance: 18,060
- Referee: Scott Johnson

Game information

First quarter

- SOU – Jarmarqueza Mims 5-yard TD run, Martell Fontenot kick good, 12:02 (SOU 7–0)
- SOU – Randall Menard 28-yard TD pass from Ladarius Skelton, Fontenot kick good, 11:47 (SOU 14–0)
- UAPB – Dejuan Miller 8-yard TD pass from Skyler Perry, two-point conversion run attempt no good, 5:09 (SOU 14–6)
- SOU – Menard 57-yard TD pass from Skelton, Fontenot kick good, 2:47 (SOU 21–7)

Second quarter

- SOU – Hunter Register 45-yard TD pass from Skelton, Fontenot kick good, 14:41 (SOU 28–7)
- UAPB – Jamie Gillan 28-yard field goal, 10:56 (SOU 28–9)
- SOU – Devon Benn 1-yard TD run, Fontenot kick good, 10:23 (SOU 35–9)
- SOU – Trey Smith 15-yard TD pass from Skelton, Fontenot kick good, 3:29 (SOU 42–9)

Third quarter

- SOU – Kendall Catalon 20-yard Td pass from John Lampley, Fontenot kick good, 8:06 (SOU 49–9)
- UAPB – Jaimon Peterson 4-yard TD run, Perry two-point conversion pass to Tyrin Ralph good, 3:59 (SOU 49–17)
- SOU – Christopher Chaney 43-yard TD run, Fontenot kick good, 1:23 (SOU 56–17)

Fourth quarter

- UAPB – Tryvarious Cole 3-yard TD run, Gillan kick good, 4:53 (SOU 56–24)

Top passers

- SOU – Ladarius Skelton – 12/15, 283 yards, 4 TD
- UAPB – Skyler Perry – 18/26, 119 yards, TD, INT

Top rushers

- SOU – Devon Benn – 8 carries, 61 yards, TD
- UAPB – Jaimon Peterson – 21 carries, 82 yards, TD

Top receivers

- SOU – Randall Menard – 2 receptions, 85 yards, 2 TD
- UAPB – Tyrin Ralph – 5 receptions, 40 yards

=== vs Grambling State ===
Grambling State vs. Southern – Game summary

Quarter	1	2	3	4	Total
Tigers	7	3	3	15	28
Jaguars	7	10	14	7	38

at Mercedes-Benz Superdome, New Orleans, LA

- Date: November 24
- Game time: 4:00 p.m. CST
- Game weather: 72 °F (22 °C); N/A (indoors)
- Game attendance: 67,871
- Referee: T. Livingston
- TV: NBCSN

Game information

First quarter

- SOU – Benjamin Harris 0-yard blocked punt returned for TD, Martell Fontenot kick good, 13:04 (SOU 7–0)
- GRAM – Darrell Clark 30-yard TD pass from Geremy Hickbottom, Garrett Urban kick good, 0:48 (TIE 7–7)

Second quarter

- SOU – Cesar Barajas 47-yard field goal, 8:46 (SOU 10–7)
- SOU – Trey Smith 23-yard TD pass from Ladarius Skelton, Barajas kick good, 2:47 (SOU 17–7)
- GRAM – Urban 44-yard field goal, 0:33 (SOU 17–10)

Third quarter

- GRAM – Urban 21-yard field goal, 10:27 (SOU 17–13)
- SOU – Kendall Catalon 80-yard TD pass from Skelton, Barajas kick good, 8:30 (SOU 24–13)
- SOU – Randall Menard 44-yard TD pass from Skelton, Barajas kick good, 3:22 (SOU 31–13)

Fourth quarter

- GRAM – Hickbottom 4-yard TD run, Hickbottom two-point conversion pass to Quintin Guice good, 12:30 (SOU 31–21)
- GRAM – Hickbottom 1-yard TD run, Urban kick good, 11:07 (SOU 31–28)
- SOU – Devon Benn 2-yard TD run, Barajas kick good, 7:51 (SOU 38–28)

Top passers

- SOU – Ladarius Skelton – 8/14, 217 yards, 3 TD
- GRAM – Geremy Hickbottom – 18/30, 188 yards, TD, INT

Top rushers

- SOU – Devon Benn – 19 carries, 167 yards, TD
- GRAM – Geremy Hickbottom – 19 carries, 60 yards, 2 TD

Top receivers

- SOU – Kendall Catalon – reception, 80 yards, TD
- GRAM – Darrell Clark – 2 receptions, 46 yards, TD

=== At Alcorn State (SWAC Championship game) ===
Southern at Alcorn State – Game summary

Quarter	1	2	3	4	Total
Jaguars	14	0	14	0	28
Braves	14	7	6	10	37

at Casem-Spinks Stadium, Lorman, MS

- Date: December 1
- Game time: 3:30 p.m. CST
- Game attendance: 20,652
- Referee: Marty Adams
- TV: ESPNU

Game information

First quarter

- SOU – Ladarius Skelton 28-yard TD run, Martell Fontenot 12:26 (SOU 7–0)
- ALCN – De'Shawn Waller 13-yard TD run, Corey McCullough kick good, 8:35 (TIE 7–7)
- ALCN – Waller 83-yard TD run, McCullough kick good, 6:03 (ALCN 14–7)
- SOU – Trey Smith 22-yard TD pass from Skelton, Fontenot kick good, 2:43 (TIE 14–14)

Second quarter

- ALCN – Noah Johnson 44-yard TD run, McCullough kick good, 0:43 (ALCN 21–14)

Third quarter

- ALCN – Johnson 1-yard TD run, McCullough kick no good, 11:12 (ALCN 27–14)
- SOU – Skelton 1-yard TD run, Fontenot kick good, 8:46 (ALCN 27–21)
- SOU – Skelton 3-yard TD run, Fontenot kick good, 3:56 (SOU 28–27)

Fourth quarter

- ALCN – McCullough 41-yard field goal, 11:31 (ALCN 30–28)
- ALCN – Waller 14-yard TD run, McCullough kick good, 3:47 (ALCN 37–28)

Top passers

- ALCN – Noah Johnson – 18/25, 135 yards
- SOU – Ladarius Skelton – 12/22, 194 yards, TD, INT

Top rushers

- ALCN – De'Shawn Waller – 16 carries, 177 yards, 3 TD
- SOU – Ladarius Skelton – 22 carries, 65 yards, 3 TD

Top receivers

- ALCN – Dayall Harris – 6 receptions, 50 yards
- SOU – Trey Smith – 7 receptions, 120 yards, TD
