= 2018 Texas Southern Tigers football team =

American college football season

2018 Texas Southern Tigers football
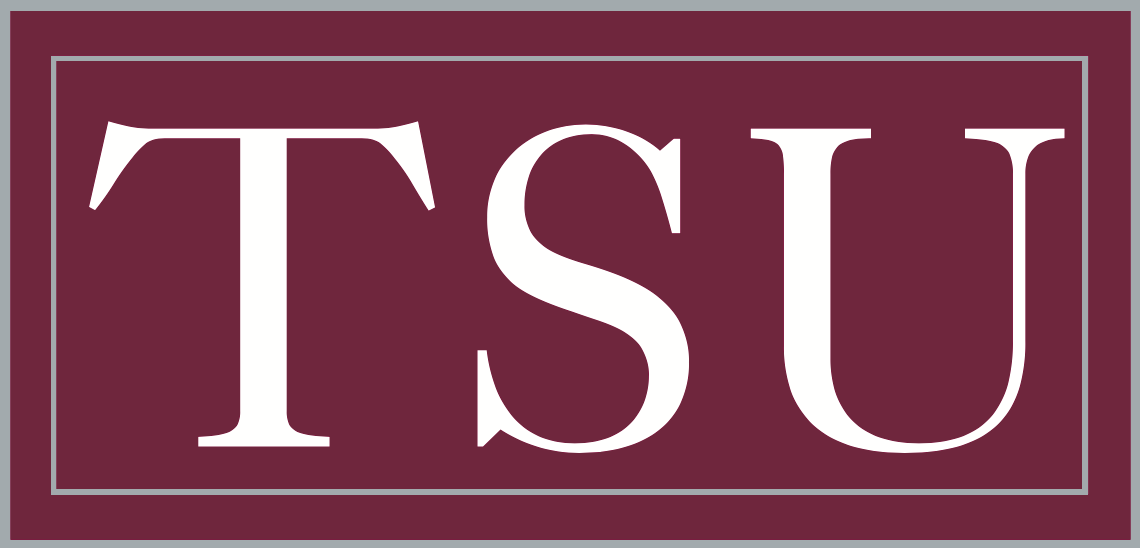
- Conference: Southwestern Athletic Conference
- West Division
- Record: 2–9 (1–6 SWAC)
- Head coach: Michael Haywood (3rd season)
- Offensive coordinator: Morris Watts (1st season)
- Defensive coordinator: Tom Anthony (3rd season)
- Home stadium: BBVA Compass Stadium

2018 Southwestern Athletic Conference football standings
	Conf.			Overall
Team	W		L	W		L
East Division
Alcorn State x$	6	–	1	9	–	4
Alabama A&M	5	–	2	6	–	5
Jackson State	4	–	3	5	–	5
Alabama State	3	–	4	4	–	7
Mississippi Valley State	1	–	6	1	–	10
West Division
Southern xy	6	–	1	7	–	4
Grambling State	4	–	3	6	–	5
Prairie View A&M	4	–	3	5	–	6
Texas Southern	1	–	6	2	–	9
Arkansas–Pine Bluff	1	–	6	2	–	9
Championship: Alcorn State 37, Southern 28
$ – Conference champion; x – Division champion/co-champions; y – Championship game participant

The 2018 Texas Southern Tigers football team represented Texas Southern University a member of the West Division of the Southwestern Athletic Conference (SWAC) during the 2018 NCAA Division I FCS football season. Led by Michael Haywood in his third and final season as head coach, the Tigers compiled an overall record of 2–9 with a mark of 1–6 in conference play, tying for fourth place in the SWAC's West Division. Texas Southern played home games at BBVA Compass Stadium in Houston.

== Schedule ==
Date	Time	Opponent	Site	TV	Result	Attendance
September 1	7:00 p.m.	Texas–Permian Basin*	BBVA Compass Stadium; Houston, TX	ATT SW+	W 26–16	1,824
September 8	6:00 p.m.	at Texas State*	Bobcat Stadium; San Marcos, TX	ESPN+	L 20–36	15,440
September 15	6:00 p.m.	at Alcorn State*	Casem-Spinks Stadium; Lorman, MS		L 15–27	14,563
September 22	7:00 p.m.	at Houston*	TDECU Stadium; Houston, TX	ESPN3	L 14–70	29,970
October 6	6:00 p.m.	Alabama A&M	BBVA Compass Stadium; Houston, TX	ATT SW	L 21–42	2,112
October 13	6:00 p.m.	Grambling State	BBVA Compass Stadium; Houston, TX	ATT SW	L 21–34	10,010
October 20	2:00 p.m.	vs. Southern	Cotton Bowl; Dallas, TX (State Fair Showdown)		L 7–21	17,105
October 27	2:00 p.m.	Mississippi Valley State^{†}	BBVA Compass Stadium; Houston, TX	ATT SW	W 42–14	5,782
November 3	2:00 p.m.	at Alabama State	New ASU Stadium; Montgomery, AL		L 30–21	12,050
November 17	7:30 p.m.	Arkansas–Pine Bluff^{†}	BBVA Compass Stadium; Houston, TX	ATT SW	L 10–15	2,045
November 24	2:00 p.m.	at Prairie View A&M	Panther Stadium at Blackshear Field; Prairie View, TX (Labor Day Classic)		L 14–60	4,125
*Non-conference game; ^{†}Homecoming; All times are in Central time

Despite Alcorn State also being a member of the SWAC, the game against Texas Southern was designated a non-conference game.

== Preseason ==
=== SWAC football media day ===
During the SWAC football media day held in Birmingham, Alabama on July 13, 2018, the Tigers were predicted to finish fourth in the West Division.

=== Presason All-SWAC Team ===
The Tigers had one player selected to Preseason All-SWAC Teams.

==== Offense ====
2nd team

Jimmy White – So. OL

== Game summaries ==
=== Texas–Permian Basin ===
	1	2	3	4	Total
Falcons	2	0	0	14	16
Tigers	13	3	7	3	26

=== At Texas State ===
	1	2	3	4	Total
Tigers	0	0	7	13	20
Bobcats	3	13	10	10	36

=== At Alcorn State ===
	1	2	3	4	Total
Tigers	0	0	7	8	15
Braves	14	13	0	0	27

=== At Houston ===
	1	2	3	4	Total
Tigers	0	0	7	7	14
Cougars	14	28	7	21	70

=== Alabama A&M ===
	1	2	3	4	Total
Bulldogs	14	14	7	7	42
Tigers	7	7	7	0	21

=== Grambling State ===
	1	2	3	4	Total
GRAM Tigers	0	14	17	3	34
TXSO Tigers	0	7	7	7	21

=== vs Southern ===
	1	2	3	4	Total
Tigers	0	0	0	7	7
Jaguars	14	0	7	0	21

=== Mississippi Valley State ===
	1	2	3	4	Total
Delta Devils	0	0	7	7	14
Tigers	7	14	7	14	42

=== At Alabama State ===
	1	2	3	4	Total
Tigers	0	7	14	0	21
Hornets	7	7	7	9	30

=== Arkansas–Pine Bluff ===
	1	2	3	4	Total
Golden Lions	3	3	6	3	15
Tigers	3	7	0	0	10

=== At Prairie View A&M ===
	1	2	3	4	Total
Tigers	7	7	0	0	14
Panthers	23	27	20	0	70
