= 2018 Alabama State Hornets football team =

American college football season

2018 Alabama State Hornets football
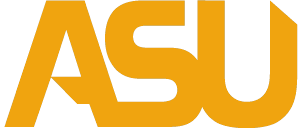
- Conference: Southwestern Athletic Conference
- East Division
- Record: 4–7 (3–4 SWAC)
- Head coach: Donald Hill-Eley (1st season)
- Offensive coordinator: Mark Orlando (4th season)
- Defensive coordinator: Osita Alaribe (2nd season)
- Home stadium: New ASU Stadium

2018 Southwestern Athletic Conference football standings
	Conf.			Overall
Team	W		L	W		L
East Division
Alcorn State x$	6	–	1	9	–	4
Alabama A&M	5	–	2	6	–	5
Jackson State	4	–	3	5	–	5
Alabama State	3	–	4	4	–	7
Mississippi Valley State	1	–	6	1	–	10
West Division
Southern xy	6	–	1	7	–	4
Grambling State	4	–	3	6	–	5
Prairie View A&M	4	–	3	5	–	6
Texas Southern	1	–	6	2	–	9
Arkansas–Pine Bluff	1	–	6	2	–	9
Championship: Alcorn State 37, Southern 28
$ – Conference champion; x – Division champion/co-champions; y – Championship game participant

The 2018 Alabama State Hornets football team represented Alabama State University as a member of the East Division of the Southwestern Athletic Conference (SWAC) during 2018 NCAA Division I FCS football season. Led by first-year head coach Donald Hill-Eley, the Hornets compiled an overall record of 4–7 with a mark of 3–4 in conference play, placing fourth in the SWAC East Division. Alabama State played home games at New ASU Stadium in Montgomery, Alabama.

== Preseason ==
=== SWAC football media day ===
During the SWAC football media day held in Birmingham, Alabama on July 13, 2018, the Hornets were predicted to finish second in the East Division.

=== Presason All-SWAC Team ===
The Hornets had six players selected to Preseason All-SWAC Teams.

==== Offense ====
2nd team

Darryl Pearson Jr. – So. QB

Tytus Howard – Sr. OL

==== Defense ====
2nd team

Christian Clark – Jr. DL

Darron Johnson – Jr. LB

Jeffrey Hill – Sr. DB

==== Special teams ====
2nd team

George Golden – So. KR

== Schedule ==
Date	Time	Opponent	Site	TV	Result	Attendance
September 1	5:00 p.m.	Tuskegee*	New ASU Stadium; Montgomery, AL		W 26–20 ^{OT}	26,222
September 8	6:30 p.m.	at No. 7 (FBS) Auburn*	Jordan-Hare Stadium; Auburn, AL	SECN	L 9–63	84,806
September 15	5:00 p.m.	at No. 7 Kennesaw State*	Fifth Third Bank Stadium; Kennesaw, GA	ESPN+	L 13–62	8,799
September 22	6:00 p.m.	at Grambling State	Eddie Robinson Stadium; Grambling, LA	ESPN3	L 0–34	7,359
October 6	2:00 p.m.	at Alcorn State	Casem-Spinks Stadium; Lorman, MS		W 28–25 ^{5OT}	19,445
October 13	4:00 p.m.	at South Alabama*	Ladd–Peebles Stadium; Mobile, AL	ESPN3	L 7–45	16,231
October 27	2:30 p.m.	vs. Alabama A&M	Legion Field; Birmingham, AL (Magic City Classic)	ESPN3, ESPNU (Note: Games will air on a tape delayed basis.)	L 10–27	65,906
November 3	2:00 p.m.	Texas Southern	New ASU Stadium; Montgomery, AL		W 30–21	12,050
November 10	2:00 p.m.	Jackson State	New ASU Stadium; Montgomery, AL		L 2–20	14,428
November 17	1:00 p.m.	at Prairie View A&M	Panther Stadium at Blackshear Field; Prairie View, TX		L 13–66	3,025
November 22	2:00 p.m.	Mississippi Valley State^{†}	New ASU Stadium; Montgomery, AL (Turkey Day Classic)		W 31–24 ^{OT}	11,593
*Non-conference game; ^{†}Homecoming; Rankings from STATS Poll released prior to the game; All times are in Central time

== Game summaries ==
=== Tuskegee ===
	1	2	3	4	OT	Total
Golden Tigers	7	6	7	0	0	20
Hornets	0	10	3	7	6	26

=== At Auburn ===
	1	2	3	4	Total
Hornets	0	2	7	0	9
No. 7 (FBS) Tigers	21	21	7	14	63

=== At Kennesaw State ===
	1	2	3	4	Total
Hornets	3	3	7	0	13
No. 7 Owls	14	28	20	0	62

=== At Grambling State ===
	1	2	3	4	Total
Hornets	0	0	0	0	0
Tigers	21	3	3	7	34

=== At Alcorn State ===
	1	2	3	4	OT	Total
Hornets	14	0	0	0	14	28
Braves	7	0	0	7	11	25

=== At South Alabama ===
	1	2	3	4	Total
Hornets	0	7	0	0	7
Jaguars	7	21	10	7	45

=== vs Alabama A&M ===
	1	2	3	4	Total
Hornets	0	7	0	3	10
Bulldogs	0	7	7	13	27

=== Texas Southern ===
	1	2	3	4	Total
Tigers	0	7	14	0	21
Hornets	7	7	7	9	30

=== Jackson State ===
	1	2	3	4	Total
Tigers	10	7	0	3	20
Hornets	0	0	0	2	2

=== At Prairie View A&M ===
	1	2	3	4	Total
Hornets	6	0	7	0	13
Panthers	21	28	7	10	66

=== Mississippi Valley State ===
	1	2	3	4	OT	Total
Delta Devils	7	7	10	0	0	24
Hornets	7	7	0	10	7	31

== Players drafted into the NFL ==
Round	Pick	Player	Position	NFL Club
1	23	Tytus Howard	OT	Houston Texans
