= 2018 Alabama A&M Bulldogs football team =

American college football season

2018 Alabama A&M Bulldogs football
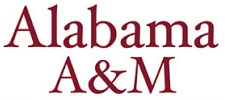
- Conference: Southwestern Athletic Conference
- East Division
- Record: 6-5 (4-3 SWAC)
- Head coach: Connell Maynor (1st season)
- Offensive coordinator: Duane Taylor (1st season)
- Defensive coordinator: Mark Debastiani (1st season)
- Home stadium: Louis Crews Stadium

2018 Southwestern Athletic Conference football standings
	Conf.			Overall
Team	W		L	W		L
East Division
Alcorn State x$	6	–	1	9	–	4
Alabama A&M	5	–	2	6	–	5
Jackson State	4	–	3	5	–	5
Alabama State	3	–	4	4	–	7
Mississippi Valley State	1	–	6	1	–	10
West Division
Southern xy	6	–	1	7	–	4
Grambling State	4	–	3	6	–	5
Prairie View A&M	4	–	3	5	–	6
Texas Southern	1	–	6	2	–	9
Arkansas–Pine Bluff	1	–	6	2	–	9
Championship: Alcorn State 37, Southern 28
$ – Conference champion; x – Division champion/co-champions; y – Championship game participant

The 2018 Alabama A&M Bulldogs football team represented Alabama Agricultural and Mechanical University in the 2018 NCAA Division I FCS football season. The Bulldogs were led by first-year head coach Connell Maynor and played their home games at Louis Crews Stadium in Huntsville, Alabama as members of the East Division of the Southwestern Athletic Conference.

== Preseason ==
=== SWAC football media day ===
During the SWAC football media day held in Birmingham, Alabama on July 13, 2018, the Bulldogs were predicted to finish fourth in the East Division.

=== Presason All-SWAC Team ===
The Bulldogs had three players selected to Preseason All-SWAC Teams.

==== Offense ====
2nd team

Jordan Bentley – Jr. RB

==== Defense ====
1st team

Vernon Moland – Sr. DL

Dylan Hamilton – Sr. DB

== Schedule ==
Date	Time	Opponent	Site	TV	Result	Attendance
September 1	6:00 p.m.	Miles*	Louis Crews Stadium; Huntsville, AL		W 37–0	11,900
September 8	6:00 p.m.	North Alabama*	Louis Crews Stadium; Huntsville, AL		L 20–25	15,100
September 15	6:00 p.m.	at Cincinnati*	Nippert Stadium; Cincinnati, OH	ESPN3	L 7–63	28,834
September 22	4:00 p.m.	vs. Southern	Ladd–Peebles Stadium; Mobile, AL (Gulf Coast Challenge)		L 27–29	20,000
September 29	2:00 p.m.	at Jackson State	Mississippi Veterans Memorial Stadium; Jackson, MS		W 21–16	30,472
October 6	6:00 p.m.	at Texas Southern	BBVA Compass Stadium; Houston, TX		W 42–21	2,112
October 13	2:00 p.m.	Alcorn State^{†}	Louis Crew Stadium; Huntsville, AL		L 26–35	19,126
October 27	2:30 p.m.	vs. Alabama State	Legion Field; Birmingham, AL (Magic City Classic)		W 27–10	65,906
November 3	2:30 p.m.	at Arkansas–Pine Bluff	Golden Lion Stadium; Pine Bluff, AR		W 45–14	13,500
November 10	1:00 p.m.	Grambling State	Louis Crew Stadium; Huntsville, AL		L 16–29	3,960
November 17	1:00 p.m.	at Mississippi Valley State	Rice–Totten Stadium; Itta Bena, MS		W 42–14	1,879
*Non-conference game; ^{†}Homecoming; All times are in Central time

== Game summaries ==
=== Miles ===
	1	2	3	4	Total
Golden Bears	0	0	0	0	0
Bulldogs	10	14	7	6	37

=== North Alabama ===
	1	2	3	4	Total
Lions	8	10	0	7	25
Bulldogs	7	10	3	0	20

=== At Cincinnati ===
	1	2	3	4	Total
Bulldogs	0	0	7	0	7
Bearcats	28	14	14	7	63

=== vs Southern ===
	1	2	3	4	Total
Jaguars	6	9	14	0	29
Bulldogs	21	0	0	6	27

=== At Jackson State ===
	1	2	3	4	Total
Bulldogs	0	7	14	0	21
Tigers	10	6	0	0	16

=== At Texas Southern ===
	1	2	3	4	Total
Bulldogs	14	14	7	7	42
Tigers	7	7	7	0	21

=== Alcorn State ===
	1	2	3	4	Total
Braves	3	7	22	3	35
Bulldogs	3	7	8	8	26

=== vs Alabama State ===
	1	2	3	4	Total
Hornets	0	7	0	3	10
Bulldogs	0	7	7	13	27

=== At Arkansas–Pine Bluff ===
	1	2	3	4	Total
Bulldogs	0	14	21	10	45
Golden Lions	0	0	6	8	14

=== Grambling State ===
	1	2	3	4	Total
Tigers	3	14	10	2	29
Bulldogs	7	3	0	6	16

=== At Mississippi Valley State ===
	1	2	3	4	Total
Bulldogs	7	21	14	0	42
Delta Devils	7	0	7	0	14
