= 2018 Jackson State Tigers football team =

American college football season

2018 Jackson State Tigers football
- Conference: Southwestern Athletic Conference
- East Division
- Record: 5–5 (4–3 SWAC)
- Head coach: Tony Hughes (3rd season; first 7 games); John Hendrick (interim; remainder of season)
- Offensive coordinator: Hal Mumme (1st season; first 3 games); Derrick McCall (interim; remainder of season)
- Offensive scheme: Air raid
- Defensive coordinator: John Hendrick (3rd season)
- Base defense: 3–4
- Home stadium: Mississippi Veterans Memorial Stadium

2018 Southwestern Athletic Conference football standings
	Conf.			Overall
Team	W		L	W		L
East Division
Alcorn State x$	6	–	1	9	–	4
Alabama A&M	5	–	2	6	–	5
Jackson State	4	–	3	5	–	5
Alabama State	3	–	4	4	–	7
Mississippi Valley State	1	–	6	1	–	10
West Division
Southern xy	6	–	1	7	–	4
Grambling State	4	–	3	6	–	5
Prairie View A&M	4	–	3	5	–	6
Texas Southern	1	–	6	2	–	9
Arkansas–Pine Bluff	1	–	6	2	–	9
Championship: Alcorn State 37, Southern 28
$ – Conference champion; x – Division champion/co-champions; y – Championship game participant

The 2018 Jackson State Tigers football team represented Jackson State University in the 2018 NCAA Division I FCS football season. The Tigers were led by second-year head coach Tony Hughes and played their home games at Mississippi Veterans Memorial Stadium in Jackson, Mississippi as members of the East Division of the Southwestern Athletic Conference (SWAC).

== Preseason ==
=== SWAC football media day ===
During the SWAC football media day held in Birmingham, Alabama on July 13, 2018, the Tigers were predicted to finish third in the East Division. They did not have any players selected to any of the Presason All-SWAC Teams.

== Schedule ==
Date	Time	Opponent	Site	TV	Result	Attendance
September 1	6:00 p.m.	at Southern Miss*	M. M. Roberts Stadium; Hattiesburg, MS	ESPN+	L 7–55	29,176
~~September 8~~	~~6:00 p.m.~~	vs. ~~Tennessee State~~*	~~Liberty Bowl Memorial Stadium~~; ~~Memphis, TN~~ (~~Southern Heritage Classic~~)		Cancelled (Note: The Tennessee State game was cancelled due to inclement weather.)	
September 15	4:30 p.m.	at Florida A&M*	Bragg Memorial Stadium; Tallahassee, FL		W 18–16	17,643
September 29	4:00 p.m.	Alabama A&M	Mississippi Veterans Memorial Stadium; Jackson, MS		L 16–21	30,472
October 6	2:30 p.m.	at Arkansas–Pine Bluff	Golden Lion Stadium; Pine Bluff, AR		W 30–27	4,200
October 13	2:00 p.m.	Mississippi Valley State^{†}	Mississippi Veterans Memorial Stadium; Jackson, MS		W 23–7	29,500
October 20	2:00 p.m.	North Alabama*	Mississippi Veterans Memorial Stadium; Jackson, MS		L 7–24	19,750
October 27	6:00 p.m.	at Southern	Ace W. Mumford Stadium; Baton Rouge, LA (BoomBox Classic)		L 7–41	20,575
November 3	2:00 p.m.	Prairie View A&M	Mississippi Veterans Memorial Stadium; Jackson, MS		W 34–28	21,729
November 10	2:00 p.m.	at Alabama State	New ASU Stadium; Montgomery, AL		W 20–2	14,428
November 17	2:00 p.m.	at Alcorn State	Casem-Spinks Stadium; Lorman, MS		L 3–24	21,312
*Non-conference game; ^{†}Homecoming; Rankings from STATS Poll released prior to the game; All times are in Central time

== Game summaries ==
=== At Southern Miss ===
	1	2	3	4	Total
Tigers	0	0	7	0	7
Golden Eagles	14	27	7	7	55

Statistics	JKST	USM
First downs	10	29
Total yards	199	457
Rushing yards	101	202
Passing yards	98	255
Turnovers	4	3
Time of possession	23:27	36:33

Team	Category	Player	Statistics
Jackson State	Passing	Derrick Ponder	12/29, 62 yards, 2 INT
Jackson State	Rushing	Keshawn Harper	9 rushes, 69 yards
Jackson State	Receiving	Kennen Young	3 receptions, 24 yards
Southern Miss	Passing	Jack Abraham	21/27, 242 yards, 4 TD
Southern Miss	Rushing	Trivenskey Mosley	12 rushes, 49 yards
Southern Miss	Receiving	Quez Watkins	8 receptions, 138 yards, 3 TD

=== At Florida A&M ===
	1	2	3	4	Total
Tigers	0	6	9	3	18
Rattlers	7	0	9	0	16

Statistics	JKST	FAMU
First downs	18	23
Total yards	379	463
Rushing yards	109	123
Passing yards	270	340
Turnovers	1	3
Time of possession	28:54	31:06

Team	Category	Player	Statistics
Jackson State	Passing	Derrick Ponder	25/41, 270 yards, TD, INT
Jackson State	Rushing	Jordan Johnson	10 rushes, 93 yards
Jackson State	Receiving	Jordan Johnson	6 receptions, 64 yards
Florida A&M	Passing	Ryan Stanley	26/37, 340 yards, TD
Florida A&M	Rushing	Hans Supre	5 receptions, 45 yards
Florida A&M	Receiving	Chad Hunter	8 receptions, 117 yards

=== Alabama A&M ===
	1	2	3	4	Total
Bulldogs	0	7	14	0	21
Tigers	10	6	0	0	16

Statistics	AAMU	JKST
First downs	23	9
Total yards	352	242
Rushing yards	108	119
Passing yards	244	123
Turnovers	2	3
Time of possession	39:00	21:00

Team	Category	Player	Statistics
Alabama A&M	Passing	Aqeel Glass	25/42, 244 yards, INT
Alabama A&M	Rushing	Trevon Walters	15 rushes, 71 yards, 2 TD
Alabama A&M	Receiving	Brian Jenkins Jr.	10 receptions, 112 yards
Jackson State	Passing	Derrick Ponder	8/19, 91 yards, INT
Jackson State	Rushing	Jordan Johnson	16 rushes, 88 yards, 2 TD
Jackson State	Receiving	Rameik Wallace	2 receptions, 41 yards

=== At Arkansas–Pine Bluff ===
	1	2	3	4	Total
Tigers	3	3	10	14	30
Golden Lions	7	0	13	7	27

Statistics	JKST	UAPB
First downs	15	25
Total yards	400	514
Rushing yards	154	214
Passing yards	246	300
Turnovers	3	2
Time of possession	26:16	33:44

Team	Category	Player	Statistics
Jackson State	Passing	Jarrad Hayes	15/25, 247 yards, 2 TD, 2 INT
Jackson State	Rushing	Keshawn Harper	6 rushes, 93 yards, TD
Jackson State	Receiving	Warren Newman	3 receptions, 72 yards, TD
Arkansas–Pine Bluff	Passing	Skyler Perry	27/41, 300 yards, 2 TD, INT
Arkansas–Pine Bluff	Rushing	Taeyler Porter	31 rushes, 167 yards, TD
Arkansas–Pine Bluff	Receiving	Dejuan Miller	8 receptions, 89 yards

=== Mississippi Valley State ===
	1	2	3	4	Total
Delta Devils	0	0	7	0	7
Tigers	14	6	0	3	23

Statistics	MVSU	JKST
First downs	13	18
Total yards	194	335
Rushing yards	-23	206
Passing yards	217	129
Turnovers	1	1
Time of possession	24:52	35:08

Team	Category	Player	Statistics
Mississippi Valley State	Passing	Jett Even	16/35, 182 yards, INT
Mississippi Valley State	Rushing	Henry Isaiah Robinson	2 rushes, 4 yards
Mississippi Valley State	Receiving	Booker Chambers	7 receptions, 74 yards
Jackson State	Passing	Jarrad Hayes	16/22, 129 yards, TD, INT
Jackson State	Rushing	Jordan Johnson	22 rushes, 134 yards
Jackson State	Receiving	Kennen Young	3 receptions, 40 yards

=== North Alabama ===
	1	2	3	4	Total
Lions	7	7	10	0	24
Tigers	0	0	0	7	7

Statistics	NOR	JKST
First downs	19	10
Total yards	365	163
Rushing yards	153	41
Passing yards	212	122
Turnovers	0	0
Time of possession	32:55	27:05

Team	Category	Player	Statistics
North Alabama	Passing	Christian Lopez	14/23, 212 yards, 2 TD
North Alabama	Rushing	Christian Lopez	12 rushes, 50 yards, TD
North Alabama	Receiving	Cortez Hall	4 receptions, 80 yards, TD
Jackson State	Passing	Jarrad Hayes	17/24, 122 yards
Jackson State	Rushing	Jordan Johnson	10 rushes, 36 yards
Jackson State	Receiving	Kobe Gates	1 reception, 28 yards

=== At Southern ===
	1	2	3	4	Total
Tigers	0	0	7	0	7
Jaguars	14	7	20	0	41

Statistics	JKST	SOU
First downs	13	13
Total yards	229	259
Rushing yards	32	198
Passing yards	197	61
Turnovers	3	0
Time of possession	30:23	29:37

Team	Category	Player	Statistics
Jackson State	Passing	Derrick Ponder	9/20, 99 yards
Jackson State	Rushing	Jordan Johnson	7 rushes, 20 yards
Jackson State	Receiving	Cameron Hines	3 receptions, 57 yards
Southern	Passing	Ladarius Skelton	5/14, 61 yards, TD
Southern	Rushing	Ladarius Skelton	13 rushes, 89 yards, TD
Southern	Receiving	Trey Smith	2 receptions, 38 yards, TD

=== Prairie View A&M ===
	1	2	3	4	Total
Panthers	0	7	7	14	28
Tigers	17	7	3	7	34

Statistics	PVAM	JKST
First downs	19	19
Total yards	361	335
Rushing yards	184	185
Passing yards	177	150
Turnovers	3	2
Time of possession	21:34	38:26

Team	Category	Player	Statistics
Prairie View A&M	Passing	Trazon Connley	19/30, 165 yards, 3 TD, INT
Prairie View A&M	Rushing	Trazon Connley	12 rushes, 110 yards, TD
Prairie View A&M	Receiving	Zarrion Holcombe	9 receptions, 77 yards, 2 TD
Jackson State	Passing	Jarrad Hayes	17/27, 150 yards, TD
Jackson State	Rushing	Jordan Johnson	8 rushes, 74 yards, TD
Jackson State	Receiving	Warren Newman	3 receptions, 38 yards

=== At Alabama State ===
	1	2	3	4	Total
Tigers	10	7	0	3	20
Hornets	0	0	0	2	2

Statistics	JKST	ALST
First downs	19	11
Total yards	269	180
Rushing yards	139	71
Passing yards	130	109
Turnovers	1	2
Time of possession	37:15	22:45

Team	Category	Player	Statistics
Jackson State	Passing	Jarrad Hayes	12/28, 130 yards, TD
Jackson State	Rushing	Keshawn Harper	16 rushes, 74 yards
Jackson State	Receiving	Romello Shumake	3 receptions, 70 yards
Alabama State	Passing	Chris Scott	8/25, 78 yards, INT
Alabama State	Rushing	Chris Scott	5 rushes, 32 yards
Alabama State	Receiving	Michael Jefferson	1 reception, 24 yards

=== At Alcorn State ===
	1	2	3	4	Total
Tigers	0	3	0	0	3
Braves	0	3	14	7	24

Statistics	JKST	ALCN
First downs	7	23
Total yards	195	394
Rushing yards	92	217
Passing yards	103	177
Turnovers	2	1
Time of possession	24:54	35:06

Team	Category	Player	Statistics
Jackson State	Passing	Jarrad Hayes	9/17, 103 yards, INT
Jackson State	Rushing	Keshawn Harper	11 rushes, 54 yards
Jackson State	Receiving	Ramone Ward	2 receptions, 53 yards
Alcorn State	Passing	Noah Johnson	14/20, 177 yards, TD
Alcorn State	Rushing	Deshawn Waller	22 rushes, 124 yards
Alcorn State	Receiving	Juan Anthony Jr.	4 receptions, 67 yards, TD
