= 2018 Grambling State Tigers football team =

American college football season

2018 Grambling State Tigers football
- Conference: Southwestern Athletic Conference
- West Division
- Record: 6–5 (4–3 SWAC)
- Head coach: Broderick Fobbs (5th season)
- Defensive coordinator: Everett Todd (5th season)
- Home stadium: Eddie Robinson Stadium

2018 Southwestern Athletic Conference football standings
	Conf.			Overall
Team	W		L	W		L
East Division
Alcorn State x$	6	–	1	9	–	4
Alabama A&M	5	–	2	6	–	5
Jackson State	4	–	3	5	–	5
Alabama State	3	–	4	4	–	7
Mississippi Valley State	1	–	6	1	–	10
West Division
Southern xy	6	–	1	7	–	4
Grambling State	4	–	3	6	–	5
Prairie View A&M	4	–	3	5	–	6
Texas Southern	1	–	6	2	–	9
Arkansas–Pine Bluff	1	–	6	2	–	9
Championship: Alcorn State 37, Southern 28
$ – Conference champion; x – Division champion/co-champions; y – Championship game participant

The 2018 Grambling State Tigers football team represented Grambling State University in the 2018 NCAA Division I FCS football season. The Tigers were led by fifth-year head coach Broderick Fobbs and played their home games at Eddie Robinson Stadium in Grambling, Louisiana as members of the West Division of the Southwestern Athletic Conference (SWAC).

== Preseason ==
=== SWAC football media day ===
During the SWAC football media day held in Birmingham, Alabama on July 13, 2018, the Tigers were predicted to win the West Division.

=== Presason All-SWAC Team ===
The Tigers led all SWAC schools by having 15 players selected to Preseason All-SWAC Teams.

==== Preseason Defensive Player of the Year ====
De'Arius Christmas – Sr. LB

Offense

1st team

William Waddell – Jr. OL

Kyle Davis – So. OL

Darrell Clark – Jr. WR

Jordan Jones – Jr. TE

2nd team

Quintin Guice – Jr. WR

Defense

1st team

Linwood Banks – Sr. DL

La’Allan Clark – Sr. DL

Brandon Varner – Sr. DL

De’Arius Christmas – Sr. LB

Percy Cargo – Sr. DB

2nd team

Anfernee Mullins – Jr. DL

De’Andre Hogues – Jr. LB

Malcolm Williams – Sr. LB

Dedrick Shy – Sr. DB

Special teams

1st team

Marc Orozco – Sr. K

=== Award watch lists ===
Award	Player	Position	Year
Buck Buchanan Award	De'Arius Christmas	LB	SR

== Schedule ==
Date	Time	Opponent	Site	TV	Result	Attendance
September 1	6:00 p.m.	at Louisiana*	Cajun Field; Lafayette, LA	ESPN3	L 17–49	28,866
September 8	6:00 p.m.	at Northwestern State*	Harry Turpin Stadium; Natchitoches, LA	ESPN3	L 7–34	13,525
September 22	6:00 p.m.	Alabama State	Eddie Robinson Stadium; Grambling, LA	ESPN3	W 34–0	7,359
September 29	4:00 p.m.	vs. Prairie View A&M	Cotton Bowl; Dallas, TX (State Fair Classic)		L 16–22	47,921
October 6	6:00 p.m.	Oklahoma Panhandle State*	Eddie Robinson Stadium; Grambling, LA		W 62–7	5,330
October 13	6:00 p.m.	at Texas Southern	BBVA Compass Stadium; Houston, TX		W 34–21	10,010
October 20	2:00 p.m.	at Alcorn State	Casem-Spinks Stadium; Lorman, MS	ESPN3	L 26–33	10,610
October 27	2:00 p.m.	Arkansas–Pine Bluff	Eddie Robinson Stadium; Grambling, LA		W 45–38 ^{OT}	5,834
November 3	2:00 p.m.	Mississippi Valley State^{†}	Eddie Robinson Stadium; Grambling, LA		W 24–19	14,215
November 10	1:00 p.m.	at Alabama A&M	Louis Crews Stadium; Huntsville, AL		W 29–16	3,960
November 24	4:00 p.m.	vs. Southern	Mercedes-Benz Superdome; New Orleans, LA (Bayou Classic)	NBCSN	L 28–38	67,871
*Non-conference game; ^{†}Homecoming; All times are in Central time

== Game summaries ==
=== At Louisiana ===
Grambling State at Louisiana – Game summary

Quarter	1	2	3	4	Total
Tigers	3	7	0	7	17
Ragin' Cajuns	21	14	14	0	49

at Cajun Field, Lafayette, LA

- Date: September 1
- Game time: 6:00 p.m. CST
- Game weather: 79 °F (26 °C); cloudy
- Game attendance: 28,886
- Referee: Jeremy Parker
- TV: ESPN3

Game information

First quarter

- GRAM – Garrett Urban, 22-yard Field Goal, 11:57 (GSU 3-0)
- LA – Trey Ragas, 4-yard TD run, Kyle Pfau kick good, 8:24 (LA 7-3)
- LA – Ja'Marcus Bradley, 3-yard TD pass from Andre Nunez, Pfau kick good, 4:22 (LA 14-3)
- LA - Jamal Bell, 18-yard TD pass from Levi Lewis, Pfau kick good, 1:40 (LA 21-3)

Second quarter

- LA – Bradley, 8-yard TD pass from Nunez, Pfau kick good, 13:05 (LA 28-3)
- GRAM - Geremy Hickbottom, 7-yard TD run, Urban kick good, 8:28 (LA 28-10)
- LA - Nunez, 4-yard TD run, Pfau kick good, 0:11 (LA 35-10)

Third quarter

- LA – Matt Barnes, 19-yard TD pass from Lewis, Pfau kick good, 9:38 (LA 42-10)
- LA – Raymond Calais, 2-yard TD run, Pfau kick good, 3:55 (LA 49-10)

Fourth quarter

- GRAM – LaDarrian Ellis-Jones, 1-yard TD run, Urban kick good, 3:41 (LA 49-17)

Top passers

- LA – Andre Nunez – 19/22, 184 yards, 2 TD
- GRAM – Geremy Hickbottom – 8/18, 112 yards

Top rushers

- LA – Trey Ragas – 13 carries, 142 yards, TD
- GRAM – Geremy Hickbottom – 5 carries, 52 yards, TD

Top receivers

- LA – Ja'Marcus Bradley – 6 receptions, 70 yards, 2 TD
- GRAM – Quintin Guice – 2 receptions, 54 yards

=== At Northwestern State ===
Grambling State at Northwestern State – Game summary

Quarter	1	2	3	4	Total
Tigers	0	7	0	0	7
Demons	21	6	0	7	34

at Harry Turpin Stadium, Natchitoches, LA

- Date: September 8
- Game time: 6:00 p.m. CST
- Game weather: 77 °F (25 °C); overcast
- Game attendance: 13,525
- Referee: Eddie Kelley

Game information

First quarter

- NSU - Jaylen Watson 20-yard TD pass from Shelton Eppler, Austyn Fendrick kick good, 12:33 (NSU 7-0)
- NSU - Jazz Ferguson 13-yard TD pass from Eppler, Fendrick kick good, 6:57 (NSU 14-0)
- NSU - Da'Von Smith 12-yard TD pass from Eppler, Fendrick kick good, 4:59 (NSU 21-0)

Second quarter

- GRAM - Kevin Dominique 6-yard TD run, Garrett Urban kick good, 14:45 (NSU 21-7)
- NSU - Levar Gumms 10-yard TD pass from Eppler, Fendrick kick no good, 1:48 (NSU 27-7)

Fourth quarter

- NSU - Jared West 3-yard TD run, Fendrick kick good, 13:42 (NSU 34-7)

Top passers

- NSU - Shelton Eppler - 24/31, 263 yards, 4 TD
- GRAM - Aldon Clark - 14/22, 125 yards, 2 INT

Top rushers

- NSU - Jared West - 15 carries, 87 yards, TD
- GRAM - Aldon Clark - 14 carries, 67 yards

Top receivers

- NSU - Quan Shorts - 6 receptions, 78 yards
- GRAM - Raylon Richardson - reception, 38 yards

=== Alabama State ===
Alabama State at Grambling State – Game summary

Quarter	1	2	3	4	Total
Hornets	0	0	0	0	0
Tigers	21	3	3	7	34

at Eddie Robinson Stadium, Grambling, LA

- Date: September 22
- Game time: 6:00 p.m. CST
- Game weather: 75 °F (24 °C); rainy
- Game attendance: 7,359
- Referee: T. Livingston

Game information

First quarter

- GRAM - Malik Route 79-yard punt returned for TD, Marc Orozco kick good, 10:32 (GRAM 7-0)
- GRAM - Aldon Clark 11-yard TD run, Orozco kick good, 5:56 (GRAM 14-0)
- GRAM - De'Arius Christmas 66-yard interception returned for TD, Orozco kick good, 3:24 (GRAM 21-0)

Second quarter

- GRAM - Orozco 21-yard field goal, 6:39 (GRAM 24-0)

Third quarter

- GRAM - Orozco 29-yard field goal, 1:24 (GRAM 27-0)

Fourth quarter

- GRAM - Devohn Lindsey 0-yard fumble returned for TD, 8:50 (GRAM 34-0)

Top passers

- GRAM - Geremy Hickbottom - 3/3, 45 yards, TD
- ASU - Darryl Pearson Jr. - 13/30, 114 yards, 2 INT

Top rushers

- GRAM - Kevin Dominique - 10 carries, 82 yards
- ASU - Ezra Gray - 20 carries, 130 yards

Top receivers

- GRAM - Kobe' Ross - 2 receptions, 31 yards
- ASU - Jamir Hannah - 3 receptions, 34 yards

=== Prairie View A&M (State Fair Classic) ===
Prairie View A&M vs. Grambling State – Game summary

Quarter	1	2	3	4	Total
Panthers	12	3	7	0	22
Tigers	0	2	0	14	16

at Cotton Bowl, Dallas, TX

- Date: September 29
- Game time: 4:00 p.m. CST
- Game weather: 77 °F (25 °C); overcast
- Game attendance: 47,921
- Referee: Scott Johnson

Game information

First quarter

- PVAMU - Markus Hardy 38-yard TD pass from Jalen Morton, Zach Elder kick no good, 4:20 (PVAMU 6-0)
- PVAMU - Dawonya Tucker 80-yard TD pass from Morton, Elder kick no good, 1:33 (PVAMU 12-0)

Second quarter

- PVAMU - Elder 43-yard field goal, 6:31 (PVAMU 15-0)
- GRAM - Team safety, 1:15 (PVAMU 15-2)

Third quarter

- PVAMU - Zarrian Holcombe 4-yard TD pass from Morton, Elder kick good, 4:03 (PVAMU 22-2)

Fourth quarter

- GRAM - Geremy Hickbottom 3-yard TD run, Marc Orozco kick good, 11:41 (PVAMU 22-9)
- GRAM - Quintin Guice 18-yard TD pass from Hickbottom, Orozco kick good, 3:34 (PVAMU 22-16)

Top passers

- PVAMU - Jalen Morton - 23/34, 269 yards, 3 TD, INT
- GRAM - Aldon Clark - 16/30, 144 yards, INT

Top rushers

- PVAMU - Dawonya Tucker - 19 carries, 72 yards
- GRAM - Lyndemian Brooks - 7 carries, 53 yards

Top receivers

- PVAMU - Dawonya Tucker - 3 receptions, 89 yards, TD
- GRAM - Darrell Clark - 4 receptions, 49 yards

=== Oklahoma Panhandle State ===
Oklahoma Panhandle State at Grambling State – Game summary

Quarter	1	2	3	4	Total
Aggies	0	7	0	0	7
Tigers	14	27	7	14	62

at Eddie Robinson Stadium, Grambling, LA

- Date: September 6
- Game time: 6:00 p.m. CST
- Game weather: 80 °F (27 °C); partly cloudy
- Game attendance: 5,330
- Referee: Eddie Kelley

Game information

First quarter

- GRAM - Geremy Hickbottom 14-yard TD run, Marc Orozco kick good, 12:56 (GRAM 7-0)
- GRAM - Johntavious Robinson 22-yard TD run, Orozco kick good, 4:23 (GRAM 14-0)

Second quarter

- GRAM - Devohn Lindsey 38-yard TD pass from Hickbottom, Orozco kick good, 14:53 (GRAM 21-0)
- GRAM - Hickbottom 2-yard TD run, Orozco kick no good, 9:26 (GRAM 27-0)
- OKP - Cole Mercer 9-yard TD pass from Martez Vrana, Eduardo Villarreal kick good, 5:23 (GRAM 27-7)
- GRAM - Quintin Guice 46-yard TD pass from Hickbottom, Orozco kick good, 3:47 (GRAM 34-7)
- GRAM - Lyndemian Brooks 60-yard TD pass from Hickbottom, Orozco kick good, 1:58 (GRAM 41-7)

Third quarter

- GRAM - Hickbottom 20-yard TD run, Orozco kick good, 8:38 (GRAM 48-7)

Fourth quarter

- GRAM - Brooks 11-yard TD run, Orozco kick good, 13:46 (GRAM 55-7)
- GRAM - Cecil Cherry 37-yard interception returned for TD, Orozco kick good, 12:13 (GRAM 62-7)

Top passers

- GRAM - Geremy Hickbottom - 16/24, 297 yards, 3 TD
- OKP - Martez Vrana - 17/28, 131 yards, TD, INT

Top rushers

- GRAM - Geremy Hickbottom - 6 carries, 71 yards, 3 TD
- OKP - Carlos Ransburgh - 8 carries, 37 yards

Top receivers

- GRAM - Lyndemian Brooks - 3 receptions, 71 yards, TD
- OKP - Nick West - 4 receptions, 50 yards

=== At Texas Southern ===
Grambling State at Texas Southern – Game summary

Quarter	1	2	3	4	Total
(GRAM) Tigers	0	14	17	3	34
(TXSO) Tigers	0	7	7	7	21

at BBVA Compass Stadium, Houston, TX

- Date: October 13
- Game time: 6:00 p.m. CST
- Game weather: 86 °F (30 °C); partly cloudy
- Game attendance: 10,010
- Referee: Tony Ross

Game information

Second quarter

- GRAM - Kyle Davis 6-yard blocked punt returned for TD, Marc Orozco kick good, 12:55 (GRAM 7-0)
- TXSO - Tylor Cook 1-yard TD run, Aaron Cuevas kick good, 4:48 (TIE 7-7)
- GRAM - Kobe' Ross 28-yard TD pass from Geremy Hickbottom, Orozco kick good, 2:33 (GRAM 14-7)

Third quarter

- GRAM - Orozco 34-yard field goal, 10:49 (GRAM 17-7)
- TXSO - Bobby Hartzog Jr. 75-yard TD pass from Jay Christophe, Cuevas kick good, 10:38 (GRAM 17-14)
- GRAM - DeVante Davis 24-yard TD pass from Hickbottom, Orozco kick good, 7:32 (GRAM 24-14)
- GRAM - Calief Samon 8-yard TD pass from Hickbottom, Orozco kick good, 2:43 (GRAM 31-14)

Fourth quarter

- TXSO - Chris Long 8-yard TD pass from Devin Williams, Cuevas kick good, 14:53 (GRAM 31-21)
- GRAM - Orozco 35-yard field goal, 8:01 (GRAM 34-21)

Top passers

- GRAM - Geremy Hickbottom - 29/44, 345 yards, 3 TD, 2 INT
- TXSO - Jay Christophe - 5/11, 130 yards, TD

Top rushers

- GRAM - Geremy Hickbottom - 19 carries, 79 yards
- TXSO - Tylor Cook - 8 carries, 39 yards, TD

Top receivers

- GRAM - DeVante Davis - 7 receptions, 114 yards, TD
- TXSO - Bobby Hartzog Jr. - 9 receptions, 190 yards, TD

=== At Alcorn State ===
Grambling State at Alcorn State – Game summary

Quarter	1	2	3	4	Total
Tigers	13	0	10	3	26
Braves	7	16	0	10	33

at Spinks-Casem Stadium, Lorman, MS

- Date: October 20
- Game time: 2:00 p.m. CST
- Game weather: 65 °F (18 °C); cloudy
- Game attendance: 10,610
- Referee: John Allmond

Game information

First quarter

- GRAM - Johntavious Robinson 3-yard TD run, Marc Orozco kick good, 10:19 (GRAM 7-0)
- GRAM - Orozco 44-yard field goal, 8:00 (GRAM 10-0)
- GRAM - Orozco 39-yard field goal, 3:18 (GRAM 13-0)
- ALCN - De'Shawn Waller 12-yard TD run, Corey McCullough kick good, 2:20 (GRAM 13-7)

Second quarter

- ALCN - McCullough 26-yard field goal, 12:34 (GRAM 13-10)
- ALCN - Chris Blair 9-yard TD pass from Noah Johnson, MuCullough kick no good, 12:06 (ALCN 16-13)
- ALCN - Javen Morrison 34-yard interception returned for TD, McCullough kick good, 11:16 (ALCN 23-13)

Third quarter

- GRAM - Orozco 52-yard field goal, 6:51 (ALCN 23-16)
- GRAM - Geremy Hickbottom 24-yard TD run, Orozco kick good, 3:48 (TIE 23-23)

Fourth quarter

- GRAM - Orozco 40-yard field goal, 12:03 (GRAM 26-23)
- ALCN - McCullough 46-yard field goal, 6:41 (TIE 26-26)
- ALCN - Blair 1-yard TD pass from Johnson, McCullough kick good, 0:12 (ALCN 33-26)

Top passers

- ALCN - Noah Johnson - 17/39, 160 yards, 2 TD, INT
- GRAM - Geremy Hickbottom - 20/36, 279 yards, INT

Top rushers

- ALCN - De'Shawn Waller - 17 carries, 74 yards, TD
- GRAM - Geremy Hickbottom - 17 carries, 54 yards, TD

Top receivers

- ALCN - Dayall Harris Jr. - 3 receptions, 50 yards
- GRAM - Quintin Guice - 4 receptions, 84 yards

=== Arkansas–Pine Bluff ===
Arkansas-Pine Bluff at Grambling State – Game summary

Quarter	1	2	3	4	OT	Total
Golden Lions	3	6	14	15	0	38
Tigers	0	7	21	10	7	45

at Eddie Robinson Stadium, Grambling, LA

- Date: October 27
- Game time: 2:00 p.m. CST
- Game weather: 76 °F (24 °C); clear
- Game attendance: 5,834
- Referee: T. Livingston

Game information

First quarter

- UAPB - Jamie Gillan 30-yard field goal, 2:25 (UAPB 3-0)

Second quarter

- GRAM - Dorrell James 5-yard TD pass from Geremy Hickbottom, Marc Orozco kick good, 9:50 (GRAM 7-3)
- UAPB - Dejuan Miller 7-yard TD pass from Skyler Perry, Gillan kick no good, 0:18 (UAPB 9-7)

Third quarter

- GRAM - LaDarrian Ellis-Jones 74-yard TD run, Orozco kick good, 14:13 (GRAM 14-9)
- UAPB - Taeyler Perry 75-yard TD run, Gillan kick good, 13:57 (UAPB 16-14)
- GRAM - Lyndemian Brooks 44-yard TD run, Orozco kick good, 9:46 (GRAM 21-16)
- UAPB - Porter 21-yard TD run, Gillan kick good, 2:46 (UAPB 23-21)
- GRAM - Quintin Guice 35-yard TD pass from Hickbottom, Orozco kick good, 0:28 (GRAM 28-23)

Fourth quarter

- UAPB - Porter 3-yard TD run, two point conversion pass from Perry to Jeremy Brown is good, 10:01 (UAPB 31-28)
- GRAM - Linwood Banks 0-yard fumble returned for TD, Orozco kick good, 8:01 (GRAM 35-31)
- UAPB - Dejuan Miller 5-yard TD pass from Perry, Gillan kick good, 4:05 (UAPB 38-35)
- GRAM - Orozco 20-yard field goal, 0:46 (TIE 38-38)

First overtime

- GRAM - Darrell Clark 25-yard TD pass from Hickbottom, Orozco kick good, (GRAM 45-38)

Top passers

- GRAM - Geremy Hickbottom - 18/26, 217 yards, 3 TD, INT
- UAPB - Skyler Perry - 23/43, 202 yards, 2 TD, INT

Top rushers

- GRAM - LaDarrian Ellis-Jones - 4 carries, 78 yards, TD
- UAPB - Taeyler Perry - 38 carries, 226 yards, 3 TD

Top receivers

- GRAM - DeVante Davis - 3 receptions, 56 yards
- UAPB - Dejuan Miller - 10 receptions, 142 yards, 2 TD

=== Mississippi Valley State ===
Mississippi Valley State at Grambling State – Game summary

Quarter	1	2	3	4	Total
Delta Devils	6	7	6	0	19
Tigers	3	14	7	0	24

at Eddie Robinson Stadium, Grambling, LA

- Date: November 3
- Game time: 2:00 p.m. CST
- Game weather: 71 °F (22 °C); clear
- Game attendance: 14,215
- Referee: John Allmond

Game information

First quarter

- MVSU - Dejerric Bryant 7-yard TD run, Justin Read kick no good, 10:50 (MVSU 7-0)
- GRAM - Marc Orozco 34-yard field goal, 4:45 (MVSU 7-3)

Second quarter

- GRAM - Darrell Clark 35-yard TD pass from Geremy Hickbottom, Orozco kick good, 12:54 (GRAM 10-7)
- GRAM - Devante Davis 1-yard TD pass from Hickbottom, Orozco kick good, 7:45 (GRAM 17-6)
- MVSU - John Derrick Smith 5-yard TD run, Ruben Piraquive kick good, 1:19 (GRAM 17-13)

Third quarter

- GRAM - Kobe' Ross 47-yard TD pass from Hickbottom, Orozco kick good, 12:20 (GRAM 24-13)
- MVSU - Booker Chambers 22-yard TD pass from Christopher Fowler, Piraquive kick no good, 6:23 (GRAM 24-19)

Top passers

- GRAM - Geremy Hickbottom - 2/24, 208 yards, 3 TD
- MVSU - Christopher Fowler - 7/8, 88 yards, TD

Top rushers

- GRAM - Johntavious Robinson - 17 carries, 130 yards
- MVSU - John Derrick Smith - 8 carries, 53 yards, TD

Top receivers

- GRAM - DeVante Davis - 3 receptions, 91 yards, TD
- MVSU - Booker Chambers - 2 receptions, 37 yards, TD

=== At Alabama A&M ===
Grambling State at Alabama A&M – Game summary

Quarter	1	2	3	4	Total
Tigers	3	14	10	2	29
Bulldogs	7	3	0	6	16

at Louis Crews Stadium, Huntsville, AL

- Date: November 10
- Game time: 1:00 p.m. CST
- Game weather: 36 °F (2 °C); clear
- Game attendance: 3,960

Game information

First quarter

- AAMU - Marceles Clash 6-yard TD pass from Aqeel Glass, Spencer Corey kick good, 10:34 (AAMU 7-0)
- GRAM - Marc Orozco 21-yard field goal, 3:53 (AAMU 7-3)

Second quarter

- GRAM - Joseph McWilliams 20-yard interception returned for TD, Orozco kick good, 11:20 (GRAM 10-7)
- AAMU - Corey 21-yard field goal, 8:15 (TIE 10-10)
- GRAM - DeVante Davis 39-yard TD pass from Geremy Hickbottom, Orozco kick good, 6:23 (GRAM 17-10)

Third quarter

- GRAM - Orozco 26-yard field goal, 3:43 (GRAM 20-10)
- GRAM - Devanir Martin 35-yard interception returned for TD, Orozco kick good, 2:51 (GRAM 27-10)

Fourth quarter

- AAMU - Dylan Smith 10-yard TD run, Corey kick no good, 5:32 (GRAM 27-16)
- GRAM - McWilliams Defensive PAT conversion, 5:32 (GRAM 29-16)

Top passers

- GRAM - Geremy Hickbottom - 12/22, 146 yards, TD, INT
- AAMU - Aqeel Glass - 16/28, 149 yards, TD, 3 INT

Top rushers

- GRAM - Lyndemian Brooks - 12 carries, 83 yards
- AAMU - Dylan Smith - 10 carries, 70 yards, TD

Top receivers

- GRAM - Devohn Lindsey - 5 receptions, 67 yards
- AAMU - Octayvius Miles - 6 receptions, 95 yards

=== Vs. Southern (Bayou Classic) ===
Southern vs. Grambling– Game summary

Quarter	1	2	3	4	Total
Jaguars	7	10	14	7	38
Tigers	7	3	3	15	28

at Mercedes-Benz Superdome, New Orleans, LA

- Date: November 24
- Game time: 4:00 p.m. CST
- Game weather: 72 °F (22 °C); N/A (domed)
- Game attendance: 67,871
- Referee: T. Livingston
- TV: NBC Sports Network

Game information

First quarter

- SOU - Benjamin Harris 0-yard punt block returned for TD, Martel Fontenot kick good, 13:04 (SOU 7-0)
- GRAM - Darrell Clark 30-yard TD pass from Geremy Hickbottom, Garrett Urban kick good, 0:48 (TIE 7-7)

Second quarter

- SOU - Cesar Barajas 47-yard field goal, 8:46 (SOU 10-7)
- SOU - Trey Smith 23-yard TD pass from Ladarius Skelton, Barajas kick good, 2:47 (SOU 17-7)
- GRAM - Urban 44-yard field goal, 0:33 (SOU 17-10)

Third quarter

- GRAM - Urban 21-yard field goal, 10:27 (SOU 17-13)
- SOU - Kendall Catalon 80-yard TD pass from Skelton, Barajas kick good, 8:30 (SOU 24-13)
- SOU - Randall Menard 44-yard TD pass from Skelton, Barajas kick good, 3:22 (SOU 31-13)

Fourth quarter

- GRAM - Hickbottom 4-yard TD run, Hickbottom two-point conversion pass to Quintin Guice good, 12:30 (SOU 31-21)
- GRAM - Hickbottom 1-yard TD run, Urban kick good, 11:07 (SOU 31-28)
- SOU - Devon Benn 2-yard TD run, Barajas kick good, 7:51 (SOU 38-38)

Top passers

- SOU - Ladarius Skelton - 8/14, 217 yards, 3 TD
- GRAM - Geremy Hickbottom - 18/30, 188 yards, TD, INT

Top rushers

- SOU - Devon Benn - 19 carries, 167 yards, TD
- GRAM - Geremy Hickbottom - 19 carries, 60 yards, 2 TD

Top receivers

- SOU - Kendall Catalon - reception, 80 yards, TD
- GRAM - Darrell Clark - 2 receptions, 46 yards, TD

== Ranking movements ==
Ranking movements Legend: ██ Increase in ranking ██ Decrease in ranking — = Not ranked RV = Received votes
	Week													
Poll	Pre	1	2	3	4	5	6	7	8	9	10	11	12	Final
STATS FCS	RV	RV	—	—	—	—	—	—	—	—	—	—	—	—
Coaches	RV	RV	—	—	—	—	—	—	—	—	—	—	—	—

== Roster ==
2018 Grambling State Tigers football team roster
Players
Coaches
Offense

Pos.	#	Name	Class
QB	2	Aldon Clark	Fr
QB	3	Charles Wright	Jr
RB	4	Kevin Dominique	Fr
WR	6	Lyndemian Brooks	Jr
WR	9	Devohn Lindsey	Sr
WR	10	Malik Route	So
WR	11	DJ Rabb	Fr
WR	13	Quintin Guice	Jr
QB	14	Quincy Mitchell	Fr
WR	16	Calief Samon	Sr
WR	17	Darrell Clark	Jr
WR	18	Raylon Richardson	So
QB	19	Geremy Hickbottom	So
RB	20	LaDarrian Ellis-Jones	So
WR	23	Donald Johnson III	Fr
RB	27	Justin Richard	Fr
RB	28	Armis Stokes	Fr
WR	32	Darqueze Brutton	Fr
RB	36	Keilon Elder	Fr
RB	40	Johntavious Robinson	Sr
OL	52	Che' Manning	Jr
OL	57	Keith Johnson	Jr
OL	60	David Moore	So
OL	62	Clarence Comeaux	So
OL	63	Ronald Evans Jr.	So
OL	64	DeAndre Sims	Jr
OL	65	DaVante Brown	Sr
OL	66	Juac Angoi	So
OL	68	Edgard Franklin	So
OL	69	Alexander Blunt	Jr
OL	70	Joseph Garza	Fr
OL	71	Fred Williams	Jr
OL	73	Carl Wilmer	Jr
OL	74	Kyle Davis	So
OL	75	William Waddell	Jr
OL	76	John Allen	Jr
OL	77	Darrell Brown	Sr
OL	79	William Jefferson	Jr
TE	80	Dorrell James	So
WR	81	Kobe' Ross	So
WR	82	DeVante Davis	Sr
WR	83	Kevin Reynolds	Jr
TE	84	Travous Baldwin	Jr
WR	85	Joshua Andrews	Fr
WR	86	DeQuarius Thomas	Jr
WR	87	Lyndon Rash	Fr
TE	88	Kalif Jackson	Jr
WR	89	Zavier Cooper	Fr
QB		John-Paul Pierce	Fr

Defense

Pos.	#	Name	Class
DB	4	Damien Crumitie	So
LB	5	De'Arius Christmas	Sr
DB	7	Danquarian Fields	Jr
DL	8	Anfernee Mullins	Jr
DB	15	Ja'Quez Splond	Jr
DB	21	Percy Cargo Jr.	Sr
DB	23	Kenan Fontenot	Fr
DB	24	Jerry Brown	So
DB	25	Devanir Martin	So
DB	26	Justin Victorian	Jr
DB	29	Joseph McWilliams	Jr
LB	34	Jeremy Carter	Jr
DB	35	Chris Grant	Jr
DB	37	Maurice Robinson II	Fr
DB	38	Trevaun Calahan	Sr
DB	39	Jaylon Terrell	Sr
LB	41	Malcolm Williams	Sr
LB	42	Marchael Jackson	Jr
DB	43	TJ Hawthorne	Fr
DL	44	Brandon Varner	Sr
LB	45	Najee Gordon	Jr
DB	46	Anthony Boston Jr.	Fr
LB	47	De'Andre Hougues	Jr
DB	48	Ryan Fields	Fr
DB	49	Phillips Lee	So
LB	51	Brandon Wiggs	Jr
LB	53	DeAndre McCarthy	Jr
LB	54	Simeon Nwokenkwo	Fr
DL	55	Linwood Banks	Sr
LB	56	Treylan Dunn	Jr
LB	58	Shalik Williams	Fr
LB	59	Donald Freeman	Jr
DL	61	Demontrey Jacobs	Fr
DL	90	Kendarius Jones	So
DL	91	Cameron Richardson	Fr
DL	92	Wesley Green	Fr
DL	93	Rodney Jackson	Sr
DL	94	Johnkil Skipper	Sr
DL	95	Don'Tae Barge	Fr
DL	96	Sundiata Anderson	Fr
DL	97	Kevin Victorian	So
DL	98	La'Allan Clark	Sr
DL	99	Martavius Dotson	So
DB		Diante Bridgewater	Jr
DB		Tre'Von Cherry	Sr

Special teams

Pos.	#	Name	Class
K/P	30	Garrett Urban	So
K/P	31	Marc Orozco	Sr
K/P	33	Miguel Mendez	Sr
LS	50	Trevor Fleming	So

Head coach

- Broderick Fobbs (Grambling State)

Coordinators/assistant coaches

- Reginald Nelson (McNeese State)
  Offensive coordinator, Offensive Line
- Everett Todd (Rice)
  Defensive coordinator, Defensive Line
- Kendrick Nord (Grambling State)
  Assistant Coach, Quarterbacks
- Lee Fobbs (Grambling State)
  Assistant Coach, Running Backs
- Darrell Kitchen (Grambling State)
  Assistant Coach, Tight Ends
- Quentin Burrell (Notre Dame)
  Assistant Coach, Wide Receivers
- Terrence Graves (Winston-Salem State)
  Assistant Coach, Linebackers, Special Teams Coordinator
- Brian Ware (Texas Lutheran)
  Assistant Coach, Safeties
- Del Lee-Collins (McNeese State)
  Assistant Coach, Cornerbacks

Legend

- (C) Team captain
- (S) Suspended
- (I) Ineligible
- Injured
- Redshirt

Roster
Last update: April 21, 2019
