= 2018 Mississippi Valley State Delta Devils football team =

American college football season

2018 Mississippi Valley State Delta Devils football
- Conference: Southwestern Athletic Conference
- East Division
- Record: 1–10 (1–6 SWAC)
- Head coach: Vincent Dancy (1st season)
- Offensive coordinator: Maurice Flowers (1st season)
- Defensive coordinator: Derek Welch (1st season)
- Home stadium: Rice–Totten Stadium

2018 Southwestern Athletic Conference football standings
	Conf.			Overall
Team	W		L	W		L
East Division
Alcorn State x$	6	–	1	9	–	4
Alabama A&M	5	–	2	6	–	5
Jackson State	4	–	3	5	–	5
Alabama State	3	–	4	4	–	7
Mississippi Valley State	1	–	6	1	–	10
West Division
Southern xy	6	–	1	7	–	4
Grambling State	4	–	3	6	–	5
Prairie View A&M	4	–	3	5	–	6
Texas Southern	1	–	6	2	–	9
Arkansas–Pine Bluff	1	–	6	2	–	9
Championship: Alcorn State 37, Southern 28
$ – Conference champion; x – Division champion/co-champions; y – Championship game participant

The 2018 Mississippi Valley State Delta Devils football team represented Mississippi Valley State University as a member of the East Division of the Southwestern Athletic Conference (SWAC) during the 2018 NCAA Division I FCS football season. Led by first-year head coach Vincent Dancy, the Delta Devils compiled an overall record of 1–10 and a mark of 1–6 in conference play, placing last out of five teams in the SWAC's East Division. Mississippi Valley State played home games at Rice–Totten Stadium in Itta Bena, Mississippi.

== Preseason ==
=== SWAC football media day ===
During the SWAC football media day held in Birmingham, Alabama on July 13, 2018, the Delta Devils were predicted to finish last in the East Division.

=== Presason All-SWAC Team ===
The Delta Devils had two players selected to Preseason All-SWAC Teams.

==== Offense ====
1st team

Quinn McElfresh – Sr. WR

==== Defense ====
1st team

Patrick Harbin – Sr. LB

== Schedule ==
Date	Time	Opponent	Site	TV	Result	Attendance
August 30	6:00 p.m.	at North Dakota*	Alerus Center; Grand Forks, ND		L 7–35	8,884
September 8	6:00 p.m.	at No. 13 Jacksonville State*	Burgess–Snow Field at JSU Stadium; Jacksonville, AL	ESPN+	L 0–71	21,864
September 22	6:00 p.m.	Alcorn State	Rice–Totten Stadium; Itta Bena, MS		L 20–56	N/A
October 6	6:00 p.m.	at Bethune–Cookman*	Daytona Stadium; Daytona Beach, FL		L 27–41	10,278
October 13	2:00 p.m.	at Jackson State	Mississippi Veterans Memorial Stadium; Jackson, MS		L 7–23	29,500
October 20	2:00 p.m.	Arkansas–Pine Bluff^{†}	Rice–Totten Stadium; Itta Bena, MS		W 48–47 ^{2OT}	
October 27	2:00 p.m.	at Texas Southern	BBVA Compass Stadium; Houston, TX		L 14–42	5,782
November 3	2:00 p.m.	at Grambling State	Eddie Robinson Stadium; Grambling, LA		L 19–24	16,151
November 10	1:00 p.m.	Hampton*	Rice–Totten Stadium; Itta Bena, MS		L 39–54	1,408
November 17	1:00 p.m.	Alabama A&M	Rice–Totten Stadium; Itta Bena, MS		L 14–42	1,879
November 22	1:00 p.m.	at Alabama State	New ASU Stadium; Montgomery, AL (Turkey Day Classic)		L 24–31 ^{OT}	11,593
*Non-conference game; ^{†}Homecoming; Rankings from STATS Poll released prior to the game; All times are in Central time

== Game summaries ==
=== At North Dakota ===
	1	2	3	4	Total
Delta Devils	0	7	0	0	7
Fighting Hawks	14	7	7	7	35

=== At Jacksonville State ===
	1	2	3	4	Total
Delta Devils	0	0	0	0	0
No. 13 Gamecocks	15	21	21	14	71

=== Alcorn State ===
	1	2	3	4	Total
Braves	10	17	14	15	56
Delta Devils	7	0	7	6	20

=== At Bethune–Cookman ===
	1	2	3	4	Total
Delta Devils	7	7	6	7	27
Wildcats	0	28	6	7	41

=== At Jackson State ===
	1	2	3	4	Total
Delta Devils	0	0	7	0	7
Tigers	14	6	0	3	23

=== Arkansas–Pine Bluff ===
	1	2	3	4	OT	2OT	Total
Golden Lions	0	17	10	7	7	6	47
Delta Devils	0	6	7	21	7	7	48

=== At Texas Southern ===
	1	2	3	4	Total
Delta Devils	0	0	7	7	14
Tigers	7	14	7	14	42

=== At Grambling State ===
	1	2	3	4	Total
Delta Devils	6	7	6	0	19
Tigers	3	14	7	0	24

=== Hampton ===
	1	2	3	4	Total
Pirates	28	12	14	0	54
Delta Devils	7	17	7	8	39

=== Alabama A&M ===
	1	2	3	4	Total
Bulldogs	7	21	14	0	42
Delta Devils	7	0	7	0	14

=== At Alabama State ===
	1	2	3	4	OT	Total
Delta Devils	7	7	10	0	0	24
Hornets	7	7	0	10	7	31
