= 2018 Arkansas–Pine Bluff Golden Lions football team =

American college football season

2018 Arkansas–Pine Bluff Golden Lions football
- Conference: Southwestern Athletic Conference
- West Division
- Record: 2–9 (1–6 SWAC)
- Head coach: Cedric Thomas (1st season)
- Offensive coordinator: Jermaine Gales (1st season)
- Defensive coordinator: Juan Navarro (1st season)
- Home stadium: Golden Lion Stadium

2018 Southwestern Athletic Conference football standings
	Conf.			Overall
Team	W		L	W		L
East Division
Alcorn State x$	6	–	1	9	–	4
Alabama A&M	5	–	2	6	–	5
Jackson State	4	–	3	5	–	5
Alabama State	3	–	4	4	–	7
Mississippi Valley State	1	–	6	1	–	10
West Division
Southern xy	6	–	1	7	–	4
Grambling State	4	–	3	6	–	5
Prairie View A&M	4	–	3	5	–	6
Texas Southern	1	–	6	2	–	9
Arkansas–Pine Bluff	1	–	6	2	–	9
Championship: Alcorn State 37, Southern 28
$ – Conference champion; x – Division champion/co-champions; y – Championship game participant

The 2018 Arkansas–Pine Bluff Golden Lions football team represented the University of Arkansas at Pine Bluff in the 2018 NCAA Division I FCS football season. The Golden Lions were led by first-year head coach Cedric Thomas and played their home games at Golden Lion Stadium in Pine Bluff, Arkansas as members of the West Division of the Southwestern Athletic Conference (SWAC).

== Preseason ==
=== SWAC football media day ===
During the SWAC football media day held in Birmingham, Alabama on July 13, 2018, the Golden Lions were predicted to finish last in the West Division.

=== Presason All-SWAC Team ===
The Golden Lions had three players at four positions selected to Preseason All-SWAC Teams.

==== Offense ====
1st team

KeShawn Williams – Sr. RB

==== Defense ====
2nd team

Kevin Agee – Sr. DL

==== Special teams ====
1st team

Jamie Gillan – Sr. P

KeShawn Williams – Sr. KR

== Schedule ==
Date	Time	Opponent	Site	TV	Result	Attendance
September 1	6:00 p.m.	Morehouse College*	Golden Lion Stadium; Pine Bluff, AR		L 30–34	5,734
September 8	6:00 p.m.	Cumberland*	Golden Lion Stadium; Pine Bluff, AR		W 55–0	2,326
September 15	6:00 p.m.	at No. 3 South Dakota State*	Dana J. Dykhouse Stadium; Brookings, SD		L 6–90	14,526
September 22	6:00 p.m.	Prairie View A&M	Golden Lion Stadium; Pine Bluff, AR		L 13–62	2,675
September 29	6:30 p.m.	at FIU*	Riccardo Silva Stadium; Miami, FL	ESPN+	L 9–55	14,937
October 6	2:30 p.m.	Jackson State	Golden Lion Stadium; Pine Bluff, AR		L 27–30	4,200
October 20	2:00 p.m.	at Mississippi Valley State	Rice–Totten Stadium; Itta Bena, MS		L 47–48 ^{2OT}	
October 27	2:00 p.m.	at Grambling State	Eddie Robinson Stadium; Grambling, LA		L 38–45 ^{OT}	5,834
November 3	2:30 p.m.	Alabama A&M	Golden Lion Stadium; Pine Bluff, AR		L 14–45	13,500
November 10	4:00 p.m.	at Southern	Ace W. Mumford Stadium; Baton Rouge, LA		L 24–56	18,060
November 17	2:00 p.m.	at Texas Southern	BBVA Compass Stadium; Houston, TX		W 15–10	2,045
*Non-conference game; Rankings from STATS Poll released prior to the game; All times are in Central time

== Game summaries ==
=== Morehouse College ===
	1	2	3	4	Total
Maroon Tigers	7	21	0	6	34
Golden Lions	0	20	3	7	30

=== Cumberland ===
	1	2	3	4	Total
Phoenix	0	0	0	0	0
Golden Lions	7	31	14	3	55

=== At South Dakota State ===
	1	2	3	4	Total
Golden Lions	6	0	0	0	6
No. 3 Jackrabbits	28	21	21	20	90

=== Prairie View A&M ===
	1	2	3	4	Total
Panthers	35	14	6	7	62
Golden Lions	3	7	0	3	13

=== At FIU ===
	1	2	3	4	Total
Golden Lions	3	0	3	3	9
Panthers	17	21	17	0	55

=== Jackson State ===
	1	2	3	4	Total
Tigers	3	3	10	14	30
Golden Lions	7	0	13	7	27

=== At Mississippi Valley State ===
	1	2	3	4	OT	2OT	Total
Golden Lions	0	17	10	7	7	6	47
Delta Devils	0	6	7	21	7	7	48

=== At Grambling State ===
	1	2	3	4	OT	Total
Golden Lions	3	6	14	15	0	38
Tigers	0	7	21	10	7	45

=== Alabama A&M ===
	1	2	3	4	Total
Bulldogs	0	14	21	10	45
Golden Lions	0	0	6	8	14

=== At Southern ===
	1	2	3	4	Total
Golden Lions	6	3	8	7	24
Jaguars	21	21	14	0	56

=== At Texas Southern ===
	1	2	3	4	Total
Golden Lions	3	3	6	3	15
Tigers	3	7	0	0	10
