= Panther Stadium at Blackshear Field =

Stadium in Prairie View, Texas

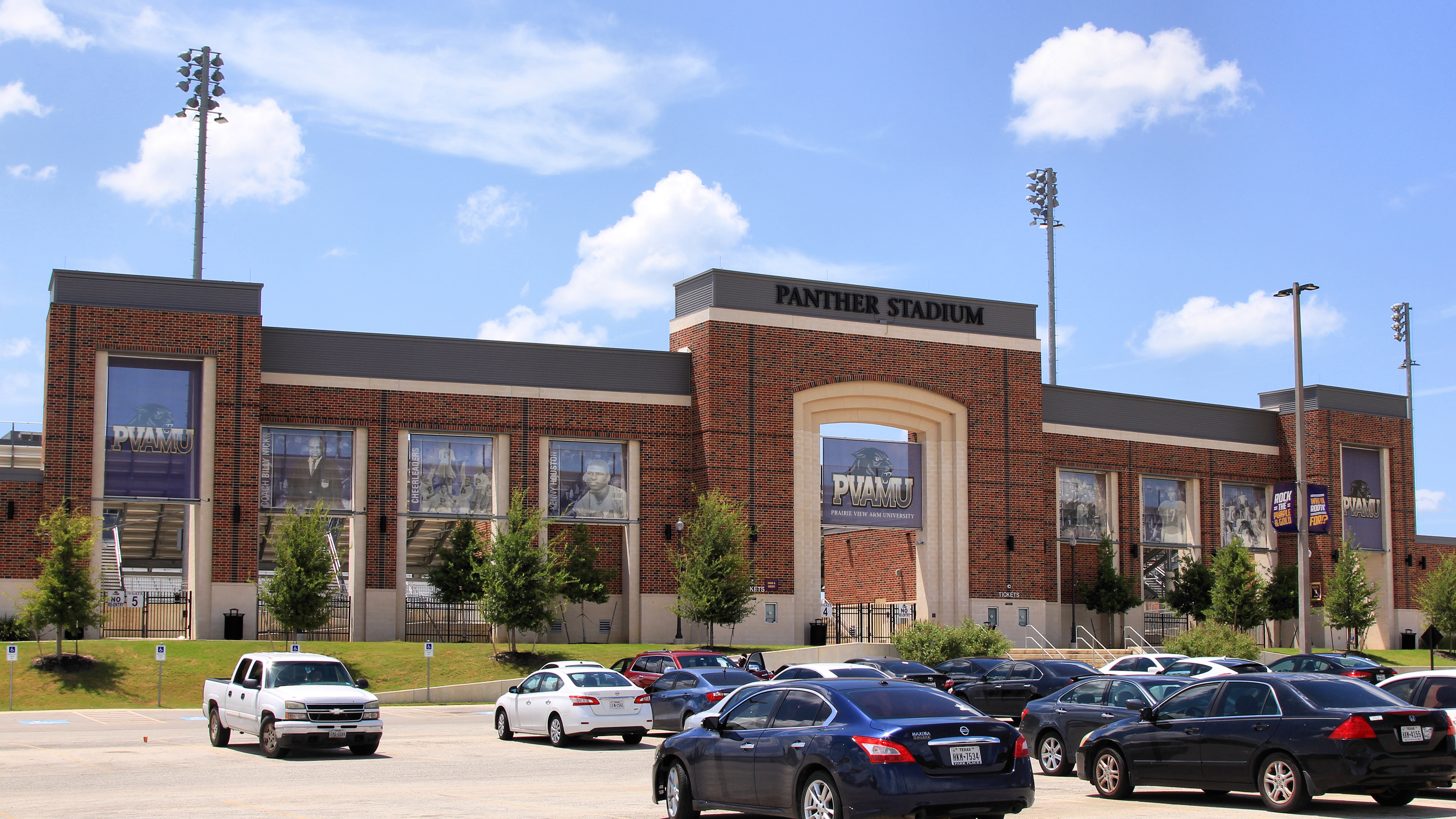
- Interactive map of Panther Stadium at Blackshear Field
- Address: 1600 Stadium Drive
- Location: Prairie View, TX
- Coordinates: 30°5′28″N 95°59′40″W
- Owner: Prairie View A&M University
- Operator: Prairie View A&M University
- Capacity: 15,000 + SRO
- Surface: FieldTurf

Construction
- Groundbreaking: January 30, 2015
- Opened: September 4, 2016
- Cost: $61 million ($81.8 million in 2025 dollars)
- Architect: PBK Architects
- Structural engineer: Walter P Moore
- General contractor: Skanska

Tenant
- Prairie View A&M Panthers (NCAA) (2016–present)

Panther Stadium at Blackshear Field is a stadium on the campus of Prairie View A&M University in Prairie View, Texas. The venue is a multi-sport field used primarily for American football and is the home field of Prairie View A&M Panthers football. The 15,000-seat stadium holds 10 skyboxes/suites and 500 premium seats, a field house featuring a large weight room, a dining area, academic support space, locker rooms and training rooms, and other amenities. The stadium's inaugural game was held on September 3, 2016 between Prairie View A&M and Texas Southern.

== History ==
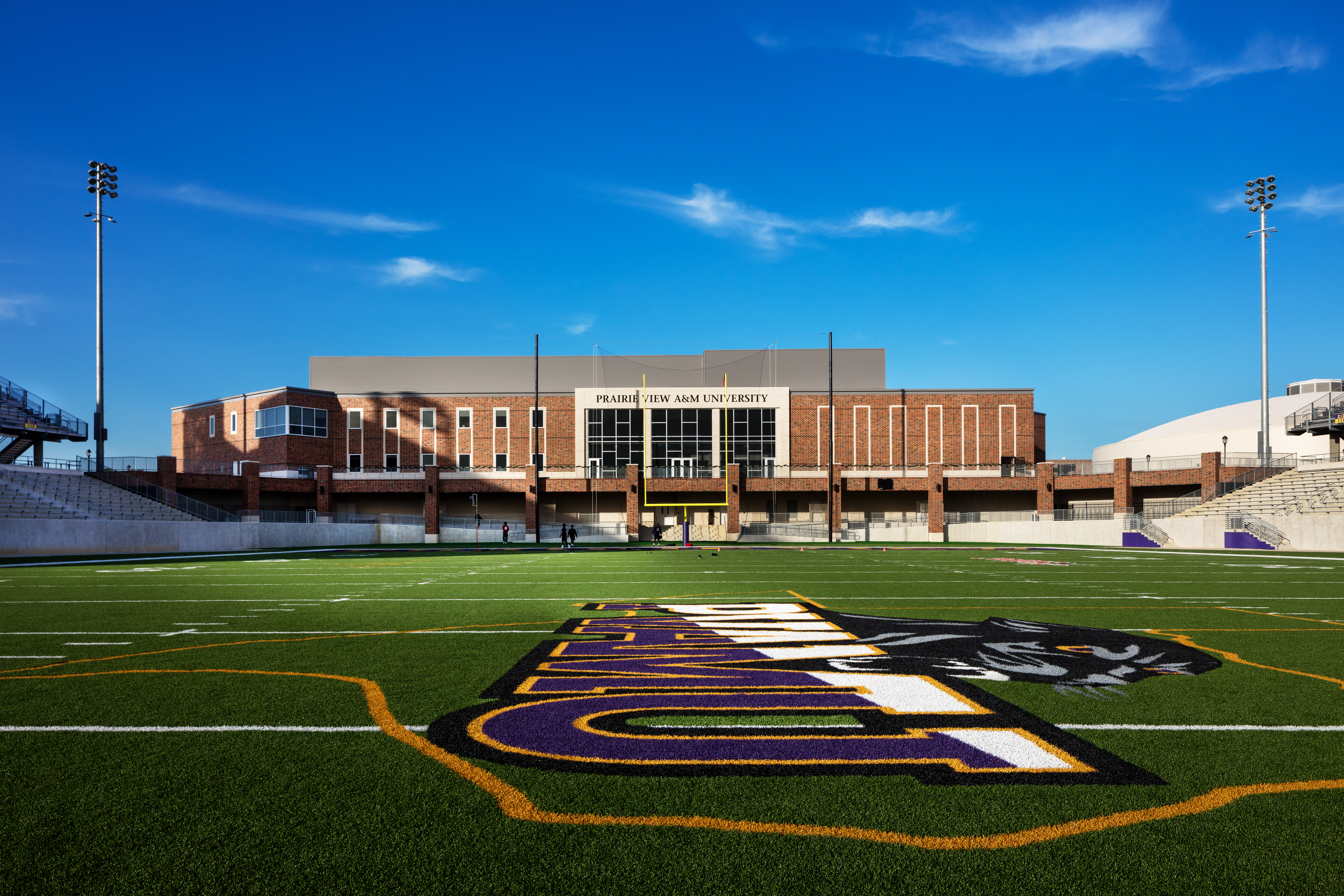
Interior of Panther Stadium at Blackshear Field

The new stadium was announced in 2014. It would cost an estimated $60 million to build and would be built on the old Edward L. Blackshear Field. Led by Roy Perry, Prairie View A&M alums earned an estimated $30 million and started the Prairie View A&M Foundation in 2009. Those funds would be used for campus enhancements with $10 million being set aside for football stadium renovations.

The Texas A&M board of regents approved the project in early 2015, and the old stadium was demolished that fall, forcing Prairie View A&M football to find a local high school to host their 2015 home games. Prairie View A&M hopes the new stadium will increase enrollment in the school. Overall students raised nearly 2/3 of the funds to build the new stadium. Additional construction at and around the stadium includes a new U.S. Olympic track and a new soccer stadium.

== Attendance records ==
Rank	Attendance	Date	Game Result
1	15,050	October 8, 2016	Prairie View A&M 24, Alabama State 17^{OT}
2	14,982	September 3, 2016	Prairie View A&M 29, Texas Southern 25
3	14,599	October 10, 2022	Prairie View A&M 58, Bethune-Cookman 48
4	14,250	October 27, 2018	Prairie View A&M 13, Alcorn State 27
5	14,224	November 4, 2023	Prairie View A&M 38, Arkansas Pine-Bluff 14
6	13,937	October 26, 2024	Prairie View A&M 34, Texas A&M-Commerce 27
7	13,626	October 19, 2019	Prairie View A&M 51, Virginia-Lynchburg 0
8	13,233	September 3, 2022	Prairie View A&M 40, Texas Southern 23
9	13,220	October 13, 2018	Prairie View A&M 0, Southern 38
10	13,206	August 31, 2024	Prairie View A&M 9, Texas Southern 27

== See also ==
- List of NCAA Division I FCS football stadiums
