= List of Chattanooga Mocs head football coaches =

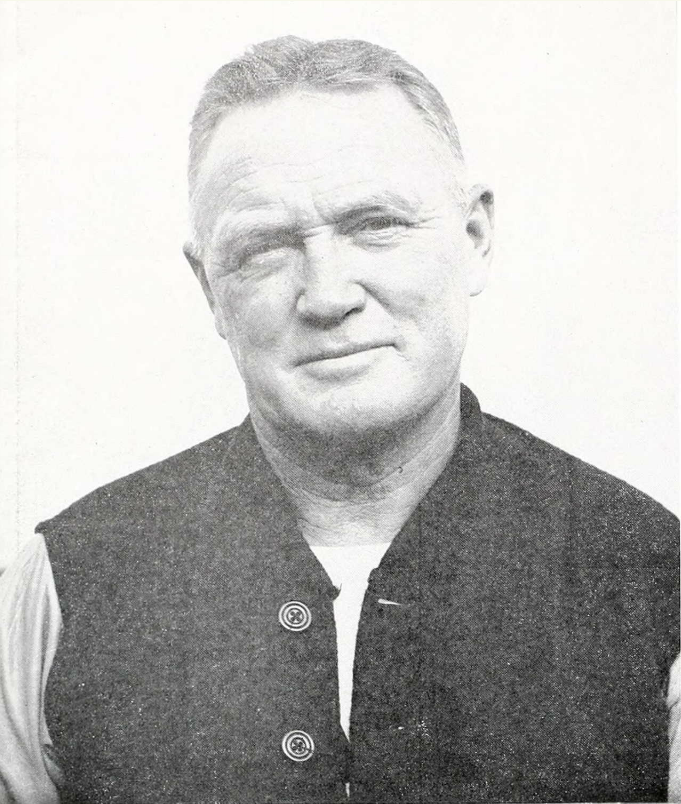
Harold Drew served as the 12th head coach of the Chattanooga Moccasins from 1929 to 1930.

The Chattanooga Mocs college football team represents the University of Tennessee at Chattanooga (Note: The University of Tennessee at Chattanooga previously competed as the University of Chattanooga from 1907 to 1969 and as U. S. Grant Memorial University from 1899 to 1906.) as a member of the Southern Conference (SoCon). The Mocs competes as part of the NCAA Division I Football Championship Subdivision. The program has had 24 head coaches, since it began play during the 1899 season. Since December 2018, Rusty Wright has served as head coach at Chattanooga.

The Mocs have played nearly 1,100 games over 116. In that time, two coaches have led Chattanooga in postseason playoff games: Buddy Nix and Russ Huesman. Five coaches have won conference championships: Frank Thomas won three, Harold Drew won one, and Scrappy Moore one as a member of the Southern Intercollegiate Athletic Association; Moore won three as a member of the Dixie Conference, and; Joe Morrison and Russ Huesman each won three as a member of the Southern Conference.

Moore is the leader in seasons coached and games won, with 171 victories during his 37 years with the program. Thomas has the highest winning percentage of those who have coached more than one game, with 0.730. Sam McAllister has the lowest winning percentage of those who have coached more than one game, with .083. Of the 24 different head coaches who have led the Mocs, Thomas and Moore have been inducted into the College Football Hall of Fame.

== Key ==
Key to symbols in coaches list
General		Overall		Conference		Postseason (Note: Although the first Rose Bowl Game was played in 1902, it has been continuously played since the 1916 game, and is recognized as the oldest bowl game by the NCAA. "—" indicates any season prior to 1916 when postseason games were not played.)	
No.	Order of coaches (Note: A running total of the number of head coaches, with coaches who served separate tenures being counted only once. Interim head coaches are represented with "Int" and are not counted in the running total. "—" indicates the team played but either without a coach or no coach is on record. "X" indicates an interim year without play.)	GC	Games coached	CW	Conference wins	PW	Postseason wins
DC	Division championships	OW	Overall wins	CL	Conference losses	PL	Postseason losses
CC	Conference championships	OL	Overall losses	CT	Conference ties	PT	Postseason ties
NC	National championships	OT	Overall ties (Note: Overtime rules in college football were introduced in 1996, making ties impossible in the period since.)	C%	Conference winning percentage		
†	Elected to the College Football Hall of Fame	O%	Overall winning percentage (Note: When computing the win–loss percentage, a tie counts as half a win and half a loss.)				

== Coaches ==
List of head football coaches showing season(s) coached, overall records, conference records, postseason records, championships and selected awards (Note: Statistics correct as of the end of the 2025 NCAA Division I FCS football season.)
No.	Name	Season(s) (Note: Chattanooga did not field teams in 1917 and 1918 due to World War I and in 1943 and 1944 due to World War II.)	GC	OW	OL	OT	O%	CW	CL	CT	C%	PW	PL	PT	CC	NC	Awards
1	Walter Hullihen	1904–1905	12	8	4	0	0.667	—	—	—	—	—	—	—	—	0	—
2	Arthur Rieber	1906	6	3	3	0	0.500	—	—	—	—	—	—	—	—	0	—
3	Sam McAllister	1907	6	0	5	1	0.083	—	—	—	—	—	—	—	—	0	—
4	Jones Beene	1908	8	4	4	0	0.500	—	—	—	—	—	—	—	—	0	—
5	W. A. Roddick	1909	7	2	3	2	0.429	—	—	—	—	—	—	—	—	0	—
6	Leslie Stauffer	1910–1913	28	16	11	1	0.589	—	—	—	—	—	—	—	—	0	—
7	Mike Balenti	1914	9	5	4	0	0.556	1	3	0	0.250	—	—	—	—	0	—
8	Johnny Spiegel	1915–1916	17	8	7	2	0.529	3	5	2	0.400	—	—	—	—	0	—
9	Silas Williams	1919–1921	27	10	15	2	0.407	3	7	0	0.300	—	—	—	—	0	—
10	Bill McAllester	1922–1924	26	9	13	4	0.423	4	9	1	0.321	—	—	—	—	0	—
11	Frank Thomas^{†}	1925–1928	37	26	9	2	0.730	19	4	2	0.800	—	—	—	3	0	—
12	Harold Drew	1929–1930	20	13	5	2	0.700	10	2	1	0.808	—	—	—	1	0	—
13	Scrappy Moore^{†}	1931–1967	333	172	148	13	0.536	33	13	8	0.685	—	—	—	3	0	—
14	Harold Wilkes	1968–1972	43	20	23	0	0.465	—	—	—	—	—	—	—	—	0	—
15	Joe Morrison	1973–1979	76	44	29	3	0.599	13	3	0	0.813	—	—	—	3	0	—
16	Bill Oliver	1980–1983	44	29	14	1	0.670	18	7	1	0.712	—	—	—	0	0	—
17	Buddy Nix	1984–1992	99	44	54	1	0.449	29	29	1	0.500	0	1	0	0	0	—
18	Tommy West	1993	11	4	7	0	0.364	2	6	0	0.250	0	0	0	0	0	—
19	Buddy Green	1994–1999	66	27	39	0	0.409	17	31	0	0.354	0	0	0	0	0	—
20	Donnie Kirkpatrick	2000–2002	34	10	24	—	0.294	6	18	—	0.250	0	0	—	0	0	—
21	Rodney Allison	2003–2008	68	17	51	—	0.250	12	32	—	0.273	0	0	—	0	0	—
22	Russ Huesman	2009–2016	96	59	37	—	0.615	42	20	—	0.677	3	3	—	3	0	—
23	Tom Arth	2017–2018	22	9	13	—	0.409	7	9	—	0.438	0	0	—	0	0	—
24	Rusty Wright	2019–present	76	42	34	—	0.553	33	19	—	0.635	1	1	—	0	0	—
