= 2020 Chattanooga Mocs football team =

American college football season

2020 Chattanooga Mocs football
- Conference: Southern Conference
- Record: 3–2 (3–1 SoCon)
- Head coach: Rusty Wright (2nd season)
- Offensive coordinator: Joe Pizzo (2nd season)
- Defensive coordinator: Lorenzo Ward (2nd season)
- Home stadium: Finley Stadium

2020 Southern Conference football standings
	Conf.			Overall
Team	W		L	W		L
No. 11 VMI $^	6	–	1	6	–	2
No. 22 East Tennessee State	4	–	2	4	–	2
Chattanooga†	3	–	1	3	–	2
Mercer	5	–	3	5	–	6
Samford	4	–	3	4	–	3
Furman	3	–	4	3	–	4
Wofford†	1	–	4	1	–	4
The Citadel	2	–	6	2	–	10
Western Carolina	1	–	5	1	–	8
$ – Conference champion; ^ – FCS playoff participant; † – Chattanooga and Wofford opted out of the remainder of the spring season on March 29 and April 5, 2021, respectively.; Rankings from STATS Poll

The 2020 Chattanooga Mocs football team represented the University of Tennessee at Chattanooga in the 2020–21 NCAA Division I FCS football season as a member of the Southern Conference (SoCon). The Mocs were led by second-year head coach Rusty Wright and played their home games at Finley Stadium in Chattanooga, Tennessee.

On March 29, 2021, Chattanooga announced that it would opt out of the remainder of the 2021 spring season due to safety concerns related to the COVID-19 pandemic.

== Schedule ==
Chattanooga originally had a game scheduled against James Madison (September 12), but it was canceled on July 17 due to the CAA's decision to cancel fall sports due to the COVID-19 pandemic.

Chattanooga's game at Western Kentucky ended in controversy when the Mocs returned a kick off for a touchdown putting them ahead 16-13 with 1:09 remaining. The touchdown was later overturned when officials claimed a fair catch had been called after review, even after video showed no fair catch called. The result of the bad call on the part of the officials would cost Chattanooga the victory.

On October 29, Nebraska attempted to replace their game against Wisconsin game with a game against Chattanooga because Wisconsin had a mass outbreak of COVID-19. However, it was denied by Big Ten commissioner Kevin Warren.

Chattanooga's games against VMI (postponed from February 20), Western Carolina (April 3), Samford (April 10), and East Tennessee State (April 17) were canceled when Chattanooga opted out of the remainder of the spring season.

Date	Time	Opponent	Rank	Site	TV	Result	Attendance
October 24	4:00 p.m.	at Western Kentucky*		Houchens Industries–L. T. Smith Stadium; Bowling Green, KY	ESPN3	L 10–13	3,905
February 27	12:00 p.m.	Wofford		Finley Stadium; Chattanooga, TN	ESPN+	W 24–13	0
March 6	1:00 p.m.	at The Citadel	No. 18	Johnson Hagood Stadium; Charleston, SC	ESPN+	W 25–24	3,108
March 20	1:00 p.m.	at No. 13 Furman	No. 11	Paladin Stadium; Greenville, SC	ESPN+	W 20–18	2,102
March 27	12:00 p.m.	Mercer	No. 9	Finley Stadium; Chattanooga, TN	ESPN+	L 28–35	3,144
*Non-conference game; Rankings from STATS Poll released prior to the game; All times are in Eastern time

== Game summaries ==
=== at Western Kentucky ===
Chattanooga at Western Kentucky

Team	1	2	3	4	Total
Mocs	7	0	3	0	10
• Hilltoppers	3	0	3	7	13

- Date: October 24, 2020
- Location: Houchens Industries–L. T. Smith Stadium
  Bowling Green, KY
- Game start: 3:05 p.m. CDT
- Elapsed time: 2 hours and 51 minutes
- Game attendance: 3,905
- Game weather: 50 °F (10 °C) • Weather: Cloudy • Wind: NE 10 MPH
- Referee: Chris Bynum
- TV announcers (ESPN3): Graham Doty (play–by–play) and Brandon Doughty (analyst)

Scoring summary
1	07:44	UTC	Drayton Arnold 10-yard rush (Victor Ulmo kick) (14 plays, 75 yards, 7:16)	UTC 7–0
1	04:06	WKU	Brayden Narveson 32-yard field goal (7 plays, 50 yards, 3:18)	UTC 7–3
3	09:35	UTC	Victor Ulmno 22-yard field goal (4 plays, 4 yards, 1:19)	UTC 10–3
3	04:57	WKU	Brayden Narveson 32-yard field goal (9 plays, 43 yards, 4:38)	UTC 10–6
4	01:21	WKU	Craig Burt Jr. 4-yard pass from Tyrrell Pigrome (Brayden Narveson kick) (10 plays, 54 yards, 4:08)	WKU 13–10

Statistics	Chattanooga	Western Kentucky
First downs	13	14
Total yards	225	254
Rushing yards	135	122
Passing yards	90	132
Turnovers	0	2
Time of possession	32:21	27:39

Team	Category	Player	Statistics
Chattanooga	Passing	Drayton Arnold	9/23, 90 yards
Chattanooga	Rushing	Ailym Ford	25 carries, 92 yards
Chattanooga	Receiving	Tyron Arnett	2 receptions, 30 yards
Western Kentucky	Passing	Tyrrell Pigrome	4/8, 73 yards, 1 TD
Western Kentucky	Rushing	Gaej Walker	17 carries, 88 yards
Western Kentucky	Receiving	Mitchell Tinsley	4 receptions, 46 yards
