= 2020 Wofford Terriers football team =

American college football season

2020 Wofford Terriers football
- Conference: Southern Conference
- Record: 1–4 (1–4 SoCon)
- Head coach: Josh Conklin (3rd season)
- Offensive coordinator: Wade Lang (31st season as OC, 33rd overall season)
- Defensive coordinator: Rob Greene (1st season)
- Home stadium: Gibbs Stadium

2020 Southern Conference football standings
	Conf.			Overall
Team	W		L	W		L
No. 11 VMI $^	6	–	1	6	–	2
No. 22 East Tennessee State	4	–	2	4	–	2
Chattanooga†	3	–	1	3	–	2
Mercer	5	–	3	5	–	6
Samford	4	–	3	4	–	3
Furman	3	–	4	3	–	4
Wofford†	1	–	4	1	–	4
The Citadel	2	–	6	2	–	10
Western Carolina	1	–	5	1	–	8
$ – Conference champion; ^ – FCS playoff participant; † – Chattanooga and Wofford opted out of the remainder of the spring season on March 29 and April 5, 2021, respectively.; Rankings from STATS Poll

The 2020 Wofford Terriers football team represented Wofford College in the 2020–21 NCAA Division I FCS football season. They were led by third-year head coach Josh Conklin and played their home games at Gibbs Stadium as a member of the Southern Conference (SoCon).

On April 5, 2021, Wofford announced that it was opting out of the remainder of the spring 2021 season as a result of injuries and player opt-outs due to COVID-19.

== Schedule ==
Wofford had games scheduled against South Carolina and South Carolina State, which were canceled due to the COVID-19 pandemic.

Wofford's games against East Tennessee State (postponed, but originally scheduled for March 6), Western Carolina (April 10), and Furman (April 17) were canceled when Wofford opted out of the remainder of the spring season.

Date	Time	Opponent	Rank	Site	TV	Result	Attendance
February 20	1:00 p.m.	Mercer	No. 16	Gibbs Stadium; Spartanburg, SC	ESPN+	W 31–14	1078
February 27	12:00 p.m.	at Chattanooga	No. 11	Finley Stadium; Chattanooga, TN	ESPN+	L 13–24	0
March 13	1:00 p.m.	at Samford	No. 20	Seibert Stadium; Homewood, AL	ESPN+	L 31–37	1176
March 27	1:00 p.m.	No. 14 VMI		Gibbs Stadium; Spartanburg, SC	ESPN+	L 31–36	1159
April 3	1:00 p.m.	The Citadel		Gibbs Stadium; Spartanburg, SC (rivalry)	ESPN+	L 24–28	1109
Rankings from STATS Poll released prior to the game; All times are in Eastern time

== Game summaries ==
=== Mercer ===
	1	2	3	4	Total
Bears	0	0	7	7	14
No. 16 Terriers	7	10	7	7	31
