= 2020 East Tennessee State Buccaneers football team =

American college football season

2020 East Tennessee State Buccaneers football
- Conference: Southern Conference

Ranking
- STATS: No. 22
- FCS Coaches: No. 23
- Record: 4–2 (4–2 SoCon)
- Head coach: Randy Sanders (3rd season)
- Offensive coordinator: Mike Rader (3rd season)
- Defensive coordinator: Billy Taylor (6th season)
- Home stadium: William B. Greene Jr. Stadium

2020 Southern Conference football standings
	Conf.			Overall
Team	W		L	W		L
No. 11 VMI $^	6	–	1	6	–	2
No. 22 East Tennessee State	4	–	2	4	–	2
Chattanooga†	3	–	1	3	–	2
Mercer	5	–	3	5	–	6
Samford	4	–	3	4	–	3
Furman	3	–	4	3	–	4
Wofford†	1	–	4	1	–	4
The Citadel	2	–	6	2	–	10
Western Carolina	1	–	5	1	–	8
$ – Conference champion; ^ – FCS playoff participant; † – Chattanooga and Wofford opted out of the remainder of the spring season on March 29 and April 5, 2021, respectively.; Rankings from STATS Poll

The 2020 East Tennessee State Buccaneers football team represented East Tennessee State University (ETSU) in the 2020–21 NCAA Division I FCS football season and were in the fifth year of their second stint as football members of the Southern Conference (SoCon). They were led by third-year head coach Randy Sanders and played their home games at William B. Greene Jr. Stadium.

== Schedule ==
East Tennessee State had a game against Georgia, which was canceled due to the COVID-19 pandemic.

Date	Time	Opponent	Rank	Site	TV	Result	Attendance
February 20	1:00 p.m.	Samford		William B. Greene Jr. Stadium; Johnson City, TN	ESPN+	W 24–17	2,106
March 6	12:00 p.m.	at No. 20 Wofford		Gibbs Stadium; Spartanburg, SC	ESPN+	Canceled (Note: On April 5, 2021, Wofford announced that it was opting out of the remainder of the spring 2021 season as a result of injuries and player opt-outs due to COVID-19. This game was postponed, with the makeup date still to be announced, at the time of its cancellation.)	
March 13	1:00 p.m.	No. 15 Furman		William B. Greene Jr. Stadium; Johnson City, TN	ESPN+	L 13–17	2,173
March 20	1:00 p.m.	at The Citadel		Johnson Hagood Stadium; Charleston, SC	ESPN+	W 28–21	2,642
March 27	1:00 p.m.	Western Carolina		William B. Greene Jr. Stadium; Johnson City, TN	ESPN+	W 24–17	2,442
April 3	1:30 p.m.	at No. 10 VMI		Alumni Memorial Field; Lexington, VA	ESPN+	W 24–20	3,000
April 10	6:00 p.m.	at Mercer	No. 21	Five Star Stadium; Macon, GA		L 13–21	3,273
April 17	3:30 p.m.	Chattanooga^{†}		William B. Greene Jr. Stadium; Johnson City, TN	ESPN+	Canceled (Note: On March 29, 2021, Chattanooga announced that it would opt out of the remainder of the 2021 spring season due to safety concerns related to the COVID-19 pandemic.)	
^{†}Homecoming; Rankings from STATS Poll released prior to the game; All times are in Eastern time
