= 2018 Furman Paladins football team =

American college football season

2018 Furman Paladins football

SoCon co-champion
- Conference: Southern Conference
- Record: 6–4 (6–2 SoCon)
- Head coach: Clay Hendrix (2nd season)
- Offensive coordinator: George Quarles (1st season)
- Defensive coordinator: Chad Staggs (2nd season)
- Captains: Harris Roberts; Jaylan Reid; Aaquil Annoor
- Home stadium: Paladin Stadium

2018 Southern Conference football standings
	Conf.			Overall
Team	W		L	W		L
No. 13 Wofford +^	6	–	2	9	–	4
No. 22 East Tennessee State +^	6	–	2	8	–	4
Furman +	6	–	2	6	–	4
Samford	5	–	3	6	–	5
Chattanooga	4	–	4	6	–	5
The Citadel	4	–	4	5	–	6
Mercer	4	–	4	5	–	6
Western Carolina	1	–	7	3	–	8
VMI	0	–	8	1	–	10
+ – Conference co-champions; ^ – FCS playoff participant; Rankings from STATS Poll

The 2018 Furman Paladins team represented Furman University as a member of the Southern Conference (SoCon) during the 2018 NCAA Division I FCS football season. Led by second-year head coach Clay Hendrix, the Paladins compiled an overall record of 6–4 with a mark of 6–2 in conference play, sharing the SoCon title with East Tennessee and Wofford. After tiebreakers, Furman did not receive the SoCon's automatic bid to the NCAA Division I Football Championship playoffs and the team did not receive an at-large bid. Furman home games at Paladin Stadium in Greenville, South Carolina.

== Preseason ==
=== Preseason media poll ===
The SoCon released their preseason media poll on July 25, 2018, with the Paladins predicted to finish in second place. The same day the coaches released their preseason poll with the Paladins predicted to finish in third place.

==== Preseason All-SoCon Teams ====
The Paladins placed seven players on the preseason all-SoCon teams.

Offense

1st team

Kealand Dirks – RB

2nd team

Reed Kroeber – OL

Jake Walker – TE

Thomas Gordon – WR

Defense

1st team

Elijah McKoy – LB

Aaquil Annoor – DB

2nd team

Jaylan Reid – DL

== Schedule ==
Date	Time	Opponent	Rank	Site	TV	Result	Attendance
September 1	12:20 p.m.	at No. 2 (FBS) Clemson*	No. 23	Memorial Stadium; Clemson, SC	ACCN	L 7–48	80,048
September 8	6:00 p.m.	at No. 15 Elon*	No. 25	Rhodes Stadium; Elon, NC	CBSI Digital/CBS SportsLive	L 7–45	8,058
September 15	1:00 p.m.	Colgate*		Paladin Stadium; Greenville, SC	WYCW	Cancelled (Note: This game has been cancelled in anticipation of Hurricane Florence.)	
September 22	7:30 p.m.	at East Tennessee State		William B. Greene Jr. Stadium; Johnson City, TN	ESPN3	L 27–29	8,453
September 29	2:00 p.m.	Western Carolina		Paladin Stadium; Greenville, SC	WYCW	W 44–38	7,201
October 13	1:00 p.m.	No. 6 Wofford		Paladin Stadium; Greenville, SC (rivalry)	WYCW	W 34–14	7,006
October 20	2:00 p.m.	Samford^{†}		Paladin Stadium; Greenville, SC	WYCW	L 25–38	6,016
October 27	2:00 p.m.	at The Citadel		Johnson Hagood Stadium; Charleston, SC (rivalry)	ESPN+	W 28–17	8,574
November 3	1:00 p.m.	Chattanooga		Paladin Stadium; Greenville, SC	WYCW	W 16–10	4,332
November 10	1:30 p.m.	at VMI		Alumni Memorial Field; Lexington, VA	ESPN+	W 49–13	3,922
November 17	3:00 p.m.	at Mercer		Five Star Stadium; Macon, GA	ESPN+	W 35–30	8,811
*Non-conference game; ^{†}Homecoming; Rankings from STATS Poll released prior to the game; All times are in Eastern time

== Game summaries ==
=== At Clemson ===
	1	2	3	4	Total
No. 23 Paladins	0	0	0	7	7
No. 2 (FBS) Tigers	10	17	14	7	48

=== At Elon ===
	1	2	3	4	Total
No. 25 Paladins	0	0	0	7	7
No. 15 Phoenix	14	14	10	7	45

=== At East Tennessee State ===
	1	2	3	4	Total
Paladins	7	6	14	0	27
Buccaneers	3	3	7	16	29

=== Western Carolina ===
	1	2	3	4	Total
Catamounts	7	3	14	14	38
Paladins	14	17	7	6	44

=== Wofford ===
	1	2	3	4	Total
No. 6 Terriers	0	7	7	0	14
Paladins	14	7	6	7	34

=== Samford ===
	1	2	3	4	Total
Bulldogs	10	0	21	7	38
Paladins	3	9	7	6	25

=== At The Citadel ===
	1	2	3	4	Total
Paladins	7	7	0	14	28
Bulldogs	3	7	7	0	17

=== Chattanooga ===
	1	2	3	4	Total
Mocs	0	0	3	7	10
Paladins	7	6	0	3	16

=== At VMI ===
	1	2	3	4	Total
Paladins	21	14	14	0	49
Keydets	7	0	0	6	13

=== At Mercer ===
	1	2	3	4	Total
Paladins	7	13	9	6	35
Bears	7	3	14	6	30

== Ranking movements ==
Ranking movements Legend: ██ Increase in ranking ██ Decrease in ranking — = Not ranked RV = Received votes
	Week													
Poll	Pre	1	2	3	4	5	6	7	8	9	10	11	12	Final
STATS FCS	23	25	RV	RV	—	—	—	RV	—	—	RV	RV	RV	
Coaches	21	21	RV	—	—	—	—	—	—	—	—	RV	RV	
