= 2020 Mercer Bears football team =

American college football season

2020 Mercer Bears football
- Conference: Southern Conference
- Record: 5–6 (5–3 SoCon)
- Head coach: Drew Cronic (1st season)
- Co-offensive coordinators: Bob Bodine (1st season); Tim Foster (1st season)
- Defensive coordinator: Joel Taylor (1st season)
- Home stadium: Five Star Stadium

2020 Southern Conference football standings
	Conf.			Overall
Team	W		L	W		L
No. 11 VMI $^	6	–	1	6	–	2
No. 22 East Tennessee State	4	–	2	4	–	2
Chattanooga†	3	–	1	3	–	2
Mercer	5	–	3	5	–	6
Samford	4	–	3	4	–	3
Furman	3	–	4	3	–	4
Wofford†	1	–	4	1	–	4
The Citadel	2	–	6	2	–	10
Western Carolina	1	–	5	1	–	8
$ – Conference champion; ^ – FCS playoff participant; † – Chattanooga and Wofford opted out of the remainder of the spring season on March 29 and April 5, 2021, respectively.; Rankings from STATS Poll

The 2020 Mercer Bears football team represented Mercer University as a member the Southern Conference (SoCon) during the 2020–21 NCAA Division I FCS football season. They were led by first-year head coach Drew Cronic and played their home games at the Five Star Stadium in Macon, Georgia. Mercer finished the season 5–6 overall and 5–3 in SoCon play to place fourth.

== Schedule ==
Mercer had a game scheduled against Vanderbilt, which was canceled due to the COVID-19 pandemic.

Date	Time	Opponent	Rank	Site	TV	Result	Attendance
October 10	3:00 p.m.	at Jacksonville State*		JSU Stadium; Jacksonville, AL	ESPN3	L 28–34	5,870
October 24	12:00 p.m.	at Army*		Michie Stadium; West Point, NY	CBSSN	L 3–49	5,181
October 31	3:00 p.m.	Abilene Christian*^{†}		Five Star Stadium; Macon, GA	ESPN3	L 17–20	2,372
February 20	1:00 p.m.	at No. 16 Wofford		Gibbs Stadium; Spartanburg, SC	ESPN+	L 14–31	1,078
February 27	3:30 p.m.	The Citadel		Five Star Stadium; Macon, GA	ESPN+	W 42–28	3,372
March 13	1:30 p.m.	at VMI		Alumni Memorial Field; Lexington, VA	ESPN+	L 14–41	1,000
March 20	3:30 p.m.	Western Carolina		Five Star Stadium; Macon, GA	ESPN+	W 45–28	3,527
March 27	12:00 p.m.	at No. 9 Chattanooga		Finley Stadium; Chattanooga, TN	ESPN+	W 35–28	3,144
April 3	3:30 p.m.	No. 21 Furman		Five Star Stadium; Macon, GA	ESPN+	W 26–14	3,627
April 10	6:00 p.m.	No. 20 East Tennessee State		Five Star Stadium; Macon, GA		W 21–13	3,273
April 17	1:00 p.m.	at Samford	No. 23	Seibert Stadium; Homewood, AL	ESPN+	L 20–44	1,176
*Non-conference game; ^{†}Homecoming; Rankings from STATS Poll released prior to the game; All times are in Eastern time

== Game summaries ==
=== At Jacksonville State ===
	1	2	3	4	Total
Bears	14	0	7	7	28
Gamecocks	3	24	0	7	34

=== At Army ===
Mercer Bears at Army Black Knights

Quarter	1	2	3	4	Total
Bears	3	0	0	0	3
Black Knights	7	14	21	7	49

at Michie Stadium, West Point, NY

- Date: October 24, 2020
- Game time: 12:00 p.m. EDT
- Game weather: Temperature: 66 °F (19 °C) • Wind: WNW 8 mph • Weather: Cloudy
- Game attendance: 5,181
- Referee: Mike Roche
- TV announcers (CBSSN): Ben Holden (play-by-play), Ross Tucker (analyst) & Tina Cervasio (sideline)
- ESPN – Mercer Bears at Army Black Knights /// Pregame Notes /// Postgame Notes

Game information

First Quarter

- (08:08) MER FG – Caleb Dowden 36-yard field goal
  Drive: 15 plays, 56 yards, 6:52; Mercer 3–0
- (04:34) ARMY TD – Tyrell Robinson 53-yard pass from Cade Ballard, Landon Salyers kick
  Drive: 7 plays, 75 yards, 3:34; Army 7–3

Second Quarter

- (13:12) ARMY TD – Sandon McCoy 1-yard rush, Landon Salyers kick
  Drive: 11 plays, 39 yards, 5:36; Army 14–3
- (01:05) ARMY TD – Sandon McCoy 1-yard rush, Landon Salyers kick
  Drive: 8 plays, 38 yards, 3:55; Army 21–3

Third Quarter

- (10:39) ARMY TD – Cade Barnard 3-yard rush, Landon Salyers kick
  Drive: 8 plays, 40 yards, 4:13; Army 28–3
- (05:13) ARMY TD – Sandon McCoy 1-yard rush, Landon Salyers kick
  Drive: 9 plays, 59 yards, 3:57; Army 35–3
- (04:39) ARMY TD – Jabari Moore 29-yard interception return, Quinn Maretzki kick
  Drive: 0 plays, 0 yards, 0:00; Army 42–3

Fourth Quarter

- (01:00) ARMY TD – Jordan Blackman 6-yard rush, Quinn Maretzki kick
  Drive: 17 plays, 91 yards, 10:03; Army 49–3

Passing

- MER – Harrison Frost: 14/22, 94 yards, 3 INT
- ARMY – Cade Ballard: 1/1, 53 yards, 1 TD

Rushing

- MER – Tyray Devezin: 11 carries, 71 yards
- ARMY – Tyhier Tyler: 10 carries, 77 yards

Receiving

- MER – Zacch Davis: 2 receptions, 32 yards
- ARMY – Tyrell Robinson: 1 reception, 53 yards, 1 TD

Defense

- MER – Isaac Dowling: 16 total tackles (7 solo, 9 assisted), 2 sacks, 2 tackles for loss
- ARMY – Spencer Jones: 7 total tackles (3 solo, 4 assisted), 1.5 tackles for loss

Statistics	MER	ARMY
First downs	14	21
3rd down efficiency	6–13	8–14
4th down efficiency	0–0	4–4
Plays–yards	57–221	66–360
Rushes–yards	33–113	63–297
Passing yards	108	63
Passing: Comp–Att–Int	16–24–3	2–3–0
Penalties–yards	3–40	4–29
Turnovers	3	0
Time of possession	24:50	35:10

=== Abilene Christian ===
	1	2	3	4	Total
Wildcats	7	0	3	10	20
Bears	0	10	7	0	17

=== At No. 16 Wofford ===
	1	2	3	4	Total
Bears	0	0	7	7	14
No. 16 Terriers	7	10	7	7	31
