= 2018 Chattanooga Mocs football team =

American college football season

2018 Chattanooga Mocs football
- Conference: Southern Conference
- Record: 6–5 (4–4 SoCon)
- Head coach: Tom Arth (2nd season)
- Offensive coordinator: Justin Rascati (2nd season)
- Home stadium: Finley Stadium

2018 Southern Conference football standings
	Conf.			Overall
Team	W		L	W		L
No. 13 Wofford +^	6	–	2	9	–	4
No. 22 East Tennessee State +^	6	–	2	8	–	4
Furman +	6	–	2	6	–	4
Samford	5	–	3	6	–	5
Chattanooga	4	–	4	6	–	5
The Citadel	4	–	4	5	–	6
Mercer	4	–	4	5	–	6
Western Carolina	1	–	7	3	–	8
VMI	0	–	8	1	–	10
+ – Conference co-champions; ^ – FCS playoff participant; Rankings from STATS Poll

The 2018 Chattanooga Mocs football team represented the University of Tennessee at Chattanooga in the 2018 NCAA Division I FCS football season as a member of the Southern Conference (SoCon). The Mocs were led by second-year head coach Tom Arth and played their home games at Finley Stadium in Chattanooga, Tennessee. They finished the season 6–5 overall and 4–4 in SoCon play to place in a three-way tie for fifth.

On December 14, head coach Arth resigned to become the head coach at Akron. He finished at Chattanooga with a two-year record of 9–13.

== Preseason ==
=== Preseason media poll ===
The SoCon released their preseason media poll on July 25, 2018, with the Mocs predicted to finish in sixth place. The same day the coaches released their preseason poll with the Mocs predicted to finish in fifth place.

==== Preseason All-SoCon Teams ====
The Mocs placed six players on the preseason all-SoCon teams.

Offense

2nd team

Tyrell Price – RB

Malcolm White – OL

Bingo Morton – WR

Defense

1st team

Isaiah Mack – DL

2nd team

Kareem Orr – DB

Specialists

1st team

Brandon Dowdell – RS

== Schedule ==
Date	Time	Opponent	Rank	Site	TV	Result	Attendance
August 30	7:00 p.m.	Tennessee Tech*		Finley Stadium; Chattanooga, TN	ESPN3	W 34–10	9,020
September 8	6:00 p.m.	at The Citadel		Johnson Hagood Stadium; Charleston, SC	ESPN+	W 29–28 ^{OT}	8,076
September 15	4:00 p.m.	at UT Martin*		Graham Stadium; Martin, TN	ESPN+	W 34–24	4,414
September 22	7:00 p.m.	No. 17 Samford		Finley Stadium; Chattanooga, TN	ESPN+	W 27–20	10,469
September 29	7:30 p.m.	at East Tennessee State	No. 20	William B. Greene Jr. Stadium; Johnson City, TN	ESPN+	L 14–17	9,277
October 6	3:00 p.m.	No. 7 Wofford		Finley Stadium; Chattanooga, TN	ESPN+	L 10–21	8,010
October 13	3:30 p.m.	at Western Carolina		E. J. Whitmire Stadium; Cullowhee, NC	ESPN+	W 26–6	7,362
October 27	3:00 p.m.	VMI^{†}		Finley Stadium; Chattanooga, TN	ESPN+	W 34–27	8,201
November 3	1:00 p.m.	at Furman		Paladin Stadium; Greenville, SC	ESPN3	L 10–16	4,332
November 10	1:00 p.m.	Mercer		Finley Stadium; Chattanooga, TN	ESPN+	L 9–13	8,014
November 17	7:30 p.m.	at South Carolina*		Williams-Brice Stadium; Columbia, SC	SECN Alternate	L 9–49	72,832
*Non-conference game; ^{†}Homecoming; Rankings from STATS Poll released prior to the game; All times are in Eastern time

== Game summaries ==
=== Tennessee Tech ===
	1	2	3	4	Total
Golden Eagles	0	7	3	0	10
Mocs	6	7	21	0	34

=== At The Citadel ===
	1	2	3	4	OT	Total
Mocs	14	7	0	0	8	29
Bulldogs	0	14	7	0	7	28

=== At UT Martin ===
	1	2	3	4	Total
Mocs	10	10	7	7	34
Skyhawks	0	7	0	17	24

=== Samford ===
	1	2	3	4	Total
No. 17 Bulldogs	0	10	3	7	20
Mocs	10	7	7	3	27

=== At East Tennessee State ===
	1	2	3	4	Total
No. 20 Mocs	0	0	0	14	14
Buccaneers	14	3	0	0	17

=== Wofford ===
	1	2	3	4	Total
No. 7 Terriers	7	7	0	7	21
Mocs	10	0	0	0	10

=== At Western Carolina ===
	1	2	3	4	Total
Mocs	9	10	7	0	26
Catamounts	0	3	0	3	6

=== VMI ===
	1	2	3	4	Total
Keydets	14	7	0	6	27
Mocs	7	14	6	7	34

=== At Furman ===
	1	2	3	4	Total
Mocs	0	0	3	7	10
Paladins	7	6	0	3	16

=== Mercer ===
	1	2	3	4	Total
Bears	0	0	0	13	13
Mocs	0	0	3	6	9

=== At South Carolina ===
	1	2	3	4	Total
Mocs	0	3	0	6	9
Gamecocks	14	14	7	14	49

== Ranking movements ==
Ranking movements Legend: ██ Increase in ranking ██ Decrease in ranking — = Not ranked RV = Received votes
	Week													
Poll	Pre	1	2	3	4	5	6	7	8	9	10	11	12	Final
STATS FCS	—	RV	RV	RV	20	RV	RV	RV	RV	RV	RV	RV	—	
Coaches	—	—	—	RV	24	RV	RV	RV	RV	RV	RV	RV	—	
