= 2018 Samford Bulldogs football team =

American college football season

2018 Samford Bulldogs football
- Conference: Southern Conference
- Record: 6–5 (5–3 SoCon)
- Head coach: Chris Hatcher (4th season)
- Offensive coordinator: Russ Callaway (3rd season)
- Offensive scheme: Air raid
- Defensive coordinator: Bill D'Ottavio (12th season)
- Base defense: 4–3
- Home stadium: Seibert Stadium

2018 Southern Conference football standings
	Conf.			Overall
Team	W		L	W		L
No. 13 Wofford +^	6	–	2	9	–	4
No. 22 East Tennessee State +^	6	–	2	8	–	4
Furman +	6	–	2	6	–	4
Samford	5	–	3	6	–	5
Chattanooga	4	–	4	6	–	5
The Citadel	4	–	4	5	–	6
Mercer	4	–	4	5	–	6
Western Carolina	1	–	7	3	–	8
VMI	0	–	8	1	–	10
+ – Conference co-champions; ^ – FCS playoff participant; Rankings from STATS Poll

The 2018 Samford Bulldogs football team represented Samford University in the 2018 NCAA Division I FCS football season. They were led by fourth-year head coach Chris Hatcher and played their home games at Seibert Stadium. They were a member of the Southern Conference (SoCon). They finished the season 6–5, 5–3 in SoCon play to finish in fourth place.

== Preseason ==
=== Award watch lists ===
Award	Player	Position	Year
Walter Payton Award	Devlin Hodges	QB	SR
Buck Buchanan Award	Ahmad Gooden	DE	SR

=== Preseason media poll ===
The SoCon released their preseason media poll on July 25, 2018, with the Bulldogs predicted to finish as SoCon champions. The same day the coaches released their preseason poll with the Bulldogs also predicted to finish as SoCon champions.

Media poll
Predicted finish	Team	Votes (1st place)
1	Samford	204 (20)
2	Furman	174 (2)
3	Wofford	163 (1)
4	Mercer	133
5	Western Carolina	114
6	Chattanooga	88
7	The Citadel	83
8	East Tennessee State	53
9	VMI	23

Coaches poll
Predicted finish	Team	Votes (1st place)
1	Samford	63 (7)
2	Wofford	53 (1)
3	Furman	52 (1)
4	Western Carolina	39
5	Chattanooga	34
6	Mercer	32
7	The Citadel	28
8	East Tennessee State	15
9	VMI	8

=== Preseason All-SoCon Teams ===
The Bulldogs placed seven players on the all-SoCon teams. Quarterback Devlin Hodges was selected as preseason offensive player of the year and Defensive lineman Ahmad Gooden was selected as preseason defensive player of the year.

Offense

1st team

Devlin Hodges – QB

Nick Nixon – OL

Kelvin McKnight – WR

2nd team

Chris Shelling – WR

Defense

1st team

Ahmad Gooden – DL

2nd team

Christian Stark – LB

Darius Harvey – DB

== Schedule ==
Date	Time	Opponent	Rank	Site	TV	Result	Attendance
August 30	6:30 p.m.	Shorter*	No. 11	Seibert Stadium; Homewood, AL	ESPN+	W 66–9	5,252
September 8	6:20 p.m.	at Florida State*	No. 9	Doak Campbell Stadium; Tallahassee, FL	ACCN	L 26–36	72,239
September 15	2:00 p.m.	Mercer	No. 9	Seibert Stadium; Homewood, AL	ESPN+	L 24–30	8,717
September 22	6:00 p.m.	at Chattanooga	No. 17	Finley Stadium; Chattanooga, TN	ESPN+	L 20–27	10,469
September 29	5:00 p.m.	at No. 4 Kennesaw State*		Fifth Third Bank Stadium; Kennesaw, GA	ESPN3	L 10–24	4,396
October 6	12:30 p.m.	Western Carolina		Seibert Stadium; Homewood, AL	ESPN3	W 66–28	3,178
October 13	2:00 p.m.	VMI		Seibert Stadium; Homewood, AL	ESPN+	W 73–22	4,163
October 20	1:00 p.m.	at Furman		Paladin Stadium; Greenville, SC	ESPN+	W 38–25	6,016
November 3	2:00 p.m.	No. 9 Wofford^{†}		Seibert Stadium; Homewood, AL	ESPN+	W 35–20	5,821
November 10	1:00 p.m.	at The Citadel		Johnson Hagood Stadium; Charleston, SC	ESPN+	L 27–42	11,145
November 17	12:00 p.m.	at No. 19 East Tennessee State		William B. Greene Jr. Stadium; Johnson City, TN	ESPN3	W 38–27	8,749
*Non-conference game; ^{†}Homecoming; Rankings from STATS Poll released prior to the game; All times are in Central time

== Game summaries ==
=== Shorter ===
	1	2	3	4	Total
Hawks	0	0	2	7	9
No. 11 Bulldogs	17	28	7	14	66

=== At Florida State ===
	1	2	3	4	Total
No. 9 Bulldogs	16	7	0	3	26
Seminoles	7	14	0	15	36

=== Mercer ===
	1	2	3	4	Total
Bears	7	10	0	13	30
No. 9 Bulldogs	7	0	7	10	24

=== At Chattanooga ===
	1	2	3	4	Total
No. 17 Bulldogs	0	10	3	7	20
Mocs	10	7	7	3	27

=== At Kennesaw State ===
	1	2	3	4	Total
Bulldogs	3	0	0	7	10
No. 4 Owls	7	7	7	3	24

=== Western Carolina ===
	1	2	3	4	Total
Catamounts	0	21	0	7	28
Bulldogs	35	7	14	10	66

=== VMI ===
	1	2	3	4	Total
Keydets	9	13	0	0	22
Bulldogs	14	28	24	7	73

=== At Furman ===
	1	2	3	4	Total
Bulldogs	10	0	21	7	38
Paladins	3	9	7	6	25

=== Wofford ===
	1	2	3	4	Total
No. 9 Terriers	7	10	3	0	20
Bulldogs	14	7	0	14	35

=== At The Citadel ===
	1	2	3	4	Total
SAM Bulldogs	14	10	3	0	27
CIT Bulldogs	0	7	14	21	42

=== At East Tennessee State ===
	1	2	3	4	Total
Bulldogs	7	10	7	14	38
No. 19 Buccaneers	10	14	3	0	27

== Ranking movements ==
Ranking movements Legend: ██ Increase in ranking ██ Decrease in ranking — = Not ranked RV = Received votes
	Week													
Poll	Pre	1	2	3	4	5	6	7	8	9	10	11	12	Final
STATS FCS	11	9	9	17	RV	—	—	—	RV	RV	RV	—	RV	
Coaches	10	9	9	17	RV	—	—	—	—	—	RV	—	—	
