= Randy Sanders =

American football player and coach (born 1965)

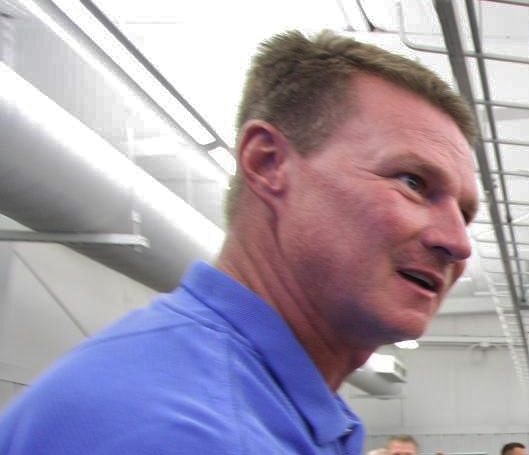
- Sanders visits the Kentucky Army National Guard in 2010

Biographical details
- Born: September 22, 1965 (age 61); Morristown, Tennessee, U.S.

Playing career
- 1984–1988: Tennessee
- Position: Quarterback

Coaching career (HC unless noted)
- 1989–1990: Tennessee (QB)
- 1991–1992: Tennessee (WR)
- 1993–1998: Tennessee (RB/RC)
- 1998–2005: Tennessee (OC/QB)
- 2006–2008: Kentucky (QB)
- 2009–2012: Kentucky (OC/QB)
- 2013–2017: Florida State (co-OC/QB)
- 2018–2021: East Tennessee State

Head coaching record
- Overall: 26–16
- Tournaments: 1–1 (NCAA D-I playoffs)

Accomplishments and honors

Championships
- SoCon (2018, 2021)

Awards
- SoCon Coach of the Year (2018, 2021)

Randy Sanders (born September 22, 1965) is an American former football coach.

He is the only person to have been a part of both the first and last Bowl Championship Series (BCS) National Champions, having been quarterbacks coach and offensive coordinator for the University of Tennessee in the first (1998) and quarterbacks coach for Florida State University in the last (2013).

As quarterbacks coach at University of Kentucky, Sanders' guidance helped André Woodson develop from an inconsistent performer into one of the top quarterbacks in the nation. In 2013 at Florida State, Sanders led Jameis Winston to become the youngest player to win a Heisman Trophy and led the Seminoles to a 14–0 record and a national championship.

On December 17, 2017, Sanders was named the head football coach at ETSU. During his time as head coach, he led the Buccaneers to two SoCon regular season championships and two FCS playoff appearances. Sanders was also awarded SoCon Coach of the Year in 2018 and 2021. During the 2021 season, Sanders led ETSU to a 23–3 victory over FBS school Vanderbilt, and the first 10-win regular season since bringing back football from a decade long hiatus. In the 2021 FCS Playoffs, ETSU received a 7 seed and faced Kennesaw State in the second round. After pulling off a miraculous 4th quarter comeback victory led by quarterback Tyler Riddell, the Bucs defeated Kennesaw State 32–31 and earned their first FCS playoff victory since 1996. The season came to an end a week later when the Bucs lost to North Dakota State in the FCS quarterfinals. On December 13, 2021, Sanders announced his retirement from football.

== Playing career ==
A native of Morristown, Tennessee, Sanders played quarterback for Morristown East High School, where he compiled career totals of 290 completions on 573 attempts for 4,225 yards, 32 touchdowns, and 28 interceptions. During his senior year, he threw for 1,359 yards and 12 touchdowns, and was considered one of the top 100 recruits in the nation. Sanders was a quarterback on the Tennessee Volunteers football team from 1984 through 1988. Primarily a backup quarterback, he earned four varsity letters and was a four-year member of the SEC Academic Honor Roll. He was also the holder on special teams. After graduation, Sanders remained with Tennessee as a volunteer assistant coach, helping coach the quarterbacks in 1989 and 1990 under head coach Johnny Majors.

== Coaching career ==
=== Tennessee ===
In all, Sanders spent 22 seasons (1984–2005) as a player and coach at the University of Tennessee. He coached wide receivers under Majors in 1991 and 1992, then became running backs coach and recruiting coordinator from 1993 to 1998 under head coach Phillip Fulmer.

Following the Volunteers' undefeated regular season and Southeastern Conference (SEC) championship in 1998, offensive coordinator David Cutcliffe resigned to become the head coach at Ole Miss. Sanders took Cutcliffe's place as offensive coordinator for the 1999 Fiesta Bowl, in which Tennessee defeated Florida State in the inaugural BCS National Championship Game; it was Sanders's first-ever game as primary play-caller.

Sanders continued as offensive coordinator, as well as quarterbacks coach, for the following seven seasons. He resigned as offensive coordinator midway through the 2005 season, though he remained as quarterbacks coach for the remainder of the campaign.

=== Kentucky ===
Sanders left Tennessee following the 2005 season and became quarterbacks coach for head coach Rich Brooks at Kentucky in 2006. Kentucky had a winning record in each of his first three seasons, and the Wildcats won three straight bowl games for the first time in school history. Following the 2008 season, Sanders received the title of offensive coordinator, replacing Joker Phillips, whose title changed to "head coach of the offense," though Phillips continued to be responsible for offensive play-calling. Sanders retained his other roles of quarterbacks coach and recruiting coordinator.

After the 2009 season, Brooks retired and Phillips became head coach, keeping Sanders as offensive coordinator. Among the offensive position coaches joining him on Phillips's first staff was Sanders's former quarterback at Tennessee, Tee Martin, who coached wide receivers.

Sanders remained at Kentucky through the 2012 season, when Phillips was fired.

=== Florida State ===
In 2013, Sanders joined Florida State as quarterbacks coach and co-offensive coordinator under head coach Jimbo Fisher. The teams that Sanders coached at Florida State from 2013 to 2017 totaled 53 wins, two ACC titles, and won the 2013 national championship. He also coached Heisman Trophy-winning quarterback Jameis Winston, who went on to be the first pick in 2015 NFL draft and selected by the Tampa Bay Buccaneers.

=== East Tennessee State ===
On December 17, 2017, following the retirement of Carl Torbush earlier in the month, the East Tennessee State Buccaneers named Sanders as their eighteenth head coach.

Pre-season polls of Southern Conference media and head football coaches picked the 2018 Buccaneers to finish second-to-last, eighth in the nine team league, in Sanders's first year as head coach. The team ended up finishing the regular season 8-3, earning a share of the Southern Conference championship and an at-large bid to the 2018 NCAA Division I FCS playoffs, the second playoff appearance in program history. The team lost its first-round game, against Jacksonville State. Sanders was named Southern Conference Coach of the Year and was one of 15 finalists for the Eddie Robinson Coach of the Year Award. Sanders also received a contract extension through 2023. On December 13, 2021, Sanders announced his retirement to focus on his family.

== Head coaching record ==
Year	Team	Overall	Conference	Standing	Bowl/playoffs	Stats^{#}	Coaches^{°}
East Tennessee State Buccaneers (Southern Conference) (2018–2021)
2018	East Tennessee State	8–4	6–2	T–1st	L NCAA Division I First Round	22	21
2019	East Tennessee State	3–9	1–7	9th			
2020–21	East Tennessee State	4–2	4–2	3rd		22	23
2021	East Tennessee State	11–2	7–1	1st	L NCAA Division I Quarterfinals	9	8
East Tennessee State:		26–16	14–11				
Total:		26–16					
National championship Conference title Conference division title or championship game berth
