= 2018 East Tennessee State Buccaneers football team =

American college football season

2018 East Tennessee State Buccaneers football

SoCon co-champion

FCS First Round, L 27–34 vs. Jacksonville State
- Conference: Southern Conference

Ranking
- STATS: No. 22
- FCS Coaches: No. 21
- Record: 8–4 (6–2 SoCon)
- Head coach: Randy Sanders (1st season)
- Offensive coordinator: Mike Rader (1st season)
- Defensive coordinator: Billy Taylor (4th season)
- Home stadium: William B. Greene Jr. Stadium

2018 Southern Conference football standings
	Conf.			Overall
Team	W		L	W		L
No. 13 Wofford +^	6	–	2	9	–	4
No. 22 East Tennessee State +^	6	–	2	8	–	4
Furman +	6	–	2	6	–	4
Samford	5	–	3	6	–	5
Chattanooga	4	–	4	6	–	5
The Citadel	4	–	4	5	–	6
Mercer	4	–	4	5	–	6
Western Carolina	1	–	7	3	–	8
VMI	0	–	8	1	–	10
+ – Conference co-champions; ^ – FCS playoff participant; Rankings from STATS Poll

The 2018 East Tennessee State Buccaneers football team represented East Tennessee State University (ETSU) in the 2018 NCAA Division I FCS football season and were in the third year of their second stint as football members of the Southern Conference (SoCon). They were led by first-year head coach Randy Sanders and played their home games at William B. Greene Jr. Stadium. They finished the season 8–4, 6–2 in SoCon play to win a share of the SoCon championship. They received an at-large bid to the FCS Playoffs, where they lost to Jacksonville State in the first round.

== Preseason ==
=== Preseason media poll ===
The SoCon released their preseason media poll on July 25, 2018, with the Buccaneers predicted to finish in eighth place. The same day the coaches released their preseason poll with the Buccaneers also predicted to finish in eighth place.

==== Preseason All-SoCon Teams ====
The Buccaneers placed five players on the preseason all-SoCon teams.

Offense

2nd team

Matt Pyke – OL

Defense

1st team

Nasir Player – DL

2nd team

Dylan Weigel – DL

Specialists

2nd team

JJ Jerman – K

Quan Harrison – RS

== Schedule ==
Date	Time	Opponent	Rank	Site	TV	Result	Attendance
September 1	7:30 p.m.	Mars Hill*		William B. Greene Jr. Stadium; Johnson City, TN	ESPN+	W 28–7	8,518
September 8	4:00 p.m.	at Tennessee*		Neyland Stadium; Knoxville, TN	SECN	L 3–59	96,464
September 14 (Note: This game was originally scheduled for September 15. It was moved up one day in anticipation of Hurricane Florence.)	2:30 p.m.	at VMI		Alumni Memorial Field; Lexington, VA	ESPN+	W 27–24	2,764
September 22	7:30 p.m.	Furman		William B. Greene Jr. Stadium; Johnson City, TN	ESPN3	W 29–27	8,453
September 29	7:30 p.m.	Chattanooga		William B. Greene Jr. Stadium; Johnson City, TN	ESPN+	W 17–14	9,277
October 6	3:35 p.m.	Gardner–Webb*^{†}		William B. Greene Jr. Stadium; Johnson City, TN	ESPN+	W 45–0	8,501
October 13	2:00 p.m.	at The Citadel	No. 23	Johnson Hagood Stadium; Charleston, SC	ESPN3	W 26–23	11,043
October 20	1:30 p.m.	at No. 12 Wofford	No. 21	Gibbs Stadium; Spartanburg, SC	ESPN+	L 17–30	6,745
October 27	3:30 p.m.	Western Carolina	No. 25	William B. Greene Jr. Stadium; Johnson City, TN	ESPN+	W 45–43 ^{3OT}	7,121
November 3	3:00 p.m.	at Mercer	No. 22	Five Star Stadium; Macon, GA	ESPN3	W 21–18	10,002
November 17	1:00 p.m.	Samford	No. 19	William B. Greene Jr. Stadium; Johnson City, TN	ESPN3	L 27–38	8,749
November 24	6:30 p.m.	at No. 8 Jacksonville State*	No. 22	JSU Stadium; Jacksonville, AL (NCAA Division I First Round)	ESPN3	L 27–34	11,024
*Non-conference game; ^{†}Homecoming; Rankings from STATS Poll released prior to the game; All times are in Eastern time

== Game summaries ==
=== Mars Hill ===
	1	2	3	4	Total
Mountain Lions	7	0	0	0	7
Buccaneers	0	7	7	14	28

=== At Tennessee ===
	1	2	3	4	Total
Buccaneers	0	0	3	0	3
Volunteers	10	28	7	14	59

=== At VMI ===
	1	2	3	4	Total
Buccaneers	7	6	7	7	27
Keydets	0	17	7	0	24

=== Furman ===
	1	2	3	4	Total
Paladins	7	6	14	0	27
Buccaneers	3	3	7	16	29

=== Chattanooga ===
	1	2	3	4	Total
Mocs	0	0	0	14	14
Buccaneers	14	3	0	0	17

=== Gardner–Webb ===
	1	2	3	4	Total
Runnin' Bulldogs	0	0	0	0	0
Buccaneers	7	10	14	14	45

=== At The Citadel ===
	1	2	3	4	Total
No. 23 Buccaneers	3	6	7	10	26
Bulldogs	6	3	0	14	23

=== At Wofford ===
	1	2	3	4	Total
No. 21 Buccaneers	0	10	0	7	17
No. 12 Terriers	3	14	7	6	30

=== Western Carolina ===
	1	2	3	4	OT	2OT	3OT	Total
Catamounts	0	13	10	7	0	7	6	43
No. 25 Buccaneers	6	6	3	15	0	7	8	45

=== At Mercer ===
	1	2	3	4	Total
No. 22 Buccaneers	0	14	7	0	21
Bears	7	3	5	3	18

=== Samford ===
	1	2	3	4	Total
Bulldogs	7	10	7	14	38
No. 19 Buccaneers	10	14	3	0	27

== FCS Playoffs ==
=== At Jacksonville State–First Round ===
	1	2	3	4	Total
No. 22 Buccaneers	10	10	0	7	27
No. 8 Gamecocks	7	3	10	14	34

== Ranking movements ==
Ranking movements Legend: ██ Increase in ranking ██ Decrease in ranking — = Not ranked RV = Received votes
	Week													
Poll	Pre	1	2	3	4	5	6	7	8	9	10	11	12	Final
STATS FCS	—	—	—	—	RV	RV	23	21	25	22	19	19	22	22
Coaches	—	—	—	—	—	RV	24	21	25	23	17	17	21	21
