= 2020 The Citadel Bulldogs football team =

American college football season

2020 The Citadel Bulldogs football
- Conference: Southern Conference
- Record: 2–10 (2–6 SoCon)
- Head coach: Brent Thompson (5th season)
- Offensive coordinator: Lou Conte (5th season)
- Offensive scheme: Triple option
- Defensive coordinator: Tony Grantham (2nd season)
- Base defense: 3–4
- Home stadium: Johnson Hagood Stadium

2020 Southern Conference football standings
	Conf.			Overall
Team	W		L	W		L
No. 11 VMI $^	6	–	1	6	–	2
No. 22 East Tennessee State	4	–	2	4	–	2
Chattanooga†	3	–	1	3	–	2
Mercer	5	–	3	5	–	6
Samford	4	–	3	4	–	3
Furman	3	–	4	3	–	4
Wofford†	1	–	4	1	–	4
The Citadel	2	–	6	2	–	10
Western Carolina	1	–	5	1	–	8
$ – Conference champion; ^ – FCS playoff participant; † – Chattanooga and Wofford opted out of the remainder of the spring season on March 29 and April 5, 2021, respectively.; Rankings from STATS Poll

The 2020 The Citadel Bulldogs football team represented The Citadel, The Military College of South Carolina in the 2020–21 NCAA Division I FCS football season. The Bulldogs were led by fifth-year head coach Brent Thompson and played their home games at Johnson Hagood Stadium. They competed as members of the Southern Conference (SoCon).

== Schedule ==
The Citadel had games scheduled against Elon and Charleston Southern, which were canceled due to the COVID-19 pandemic.

Date	Time	Opponent	Site	TV	Result	Attendance
September 12	7:00 p.m.	at South Florida*	Raymond James Stadium; Tampa, FL	ESPNU	L 6–27	0
September 19	4:00 p.m.	at No. 1 (FBS) Clemson*	Memorial Stadium; Clemson, SC	ACCN	L 0–49	18,609
September 26	1:00 p.m.	Eastern Kentucky*	Johnson Hagood Stadium; Charleston, SC	ESPN+	L 14–37	3,081
October 10	1:30 p.m.	at Army*	Michie Stadium; West Point, NY	CBSSN	L 9–14	5,344
February 27	3:30 p.m.	at Mercer	Moye Complex; Macon, GA	ESPN+	L 28–42	3372
March 6	1:00 p.m.	No. 18 Chattanooga	Johnson Hagood Stadium; Charleston, SC	ESPN+	L 24–25	3108
March 13	1:00 p.m.	at Western Carolina	E. J. Whitmire Stadium; Cullowhee, NC	ESPN+	L 14–21	980
March 20	1:00 p.m.	East Tennessee State	Johnson Hagood Stadium; Charleston, SC	ESPN+	L 21–28	2642
March 27	1:00 p.m.	Samford^{†}	Johnson Hagood Stadium; Charleston, SC	ESPN+	L 7–55	3081
April 3	1:00 p.m.	at Wofford	Gibbs Stadium; Spartanburg, SC (rivalry)	ESPN+	W 28–24	1109
April 10	1:00 p.m.	Furman	Johnson Hagood Stadium; Charleston, SC (rivalry)	ESPN+	W 26–7	3081
April 17	1:30 p.m.	at No. 15 VMI	Alumni Memorial Field; Lexington, VA (Military Classic of the South)	ESPN+	L 17–31	3000
*Non-conference game; ^{†}Homecoming; Rankings from STATS Poll released prior to the game; All times are in Eastern time

== Game summaries ==
=== At South Florida ===
The Citadel at South Florida

Team	1	2	3	4	Total
Bulldogs	3	3	0	0	6
• Bulls	7	13	0	7	27

- Date: September 12, 2020
- Location: Raymond James Stadium
  Tampa, FL
- Game start: 7:00 p.m. EDT
- Elapsed time: 3 hours and 7 minutes
- Game attendance: 0
- Referee: Tim Rich
- TV announcers (ESPNU): Lincoln Rose (play-by-play) and Stan Routt (analyst)

Scoring summary
1	04:07	CIT	Colby Kinter 45-yard field goal (10 plays, 38 yards, 4:16)	CIT 3–0
1	00:49	USF	DeVontres Dukes 10-yard pass from Jordan McCloud (Spencer Shrader kick) (8 plays, 62 yards, 3:18)	USF 7–3
2	11:08	CIT	Colby Kinter 41-yard field goal (10 plays, 54 yards, 4:41)	USF 7–6
2	06:52	USF	Omarion Dollison 0-yard punt returned (Spencer Shrader PAT failed) (3 plays, −6 yards, 1:31)	USF 13–6
2	02:41	USF	Noah Johnson 9-yard rush (Spencer Shrader kick) (5 plays, 60 yards, 2:44)	USF 20–6
4	06:55	USF	Kelley Jonier 3-yard rush (Spencer Shrader kick) (7 plays, 86 yards, 2:59)	USF 27–6

Statistics	The Citadel	South Florida
First downs	16	20
Total yards	284	404
Rushing yards	200	302
Passing yards	84	102
Turnovers	0	3
Time of possession	32:17	27:43

Team	Category	Player	Statistics
The Citadel	Passing	Brandon Rainey	4/18, 84 yards, 1 INT
The Citadel	Rushing	Brandon Rainey	20 carries, 65 yards
The Citadel	Receiving	Ryan McCarthy	2 receptions, 44 yards
South Florida	Passing	Jordan McCloud	11/16, 68 yards, 1 TD, 1 INT
South Florida	Rushing	Kelley Joiner	8 carries, 87 yards, 1 TD
South Florida	Receiving	Bryce Miller	3 receptions, 36 yards

=== At Clemson ===
	1	2	3	4	Total
Bulldogs	0	0	0	0	0
No. 1 (FBS) Tigers	28	21	0	0	49

=== Eastern Kentucky ===
	1	2	3	4	Total
Colonels	13	10	7	7	37
Bulldogs	7	7	0	0	14

=== At Army ===
	1	2	3	4	Total
Bulldogs	3	0	0	6	9
Black Knights	0	7	7	0	14
