= 2020 Furman Paladins football team =

American college football season

2020 Furman Paladins football
- Conference: Southern Conference
- Record: 3–4 (3–4 SoCon)
- Head coach: Clay Hendrix (4th season)
- Offensive coordinator: George Quarles (3rd season)
- Defensive coordinator: Duane Vaughn (2nd season)
- Captains: Elijah McKoy; Hamp Sisson; Devin Wynn; DiMarcus Clay; Jordan Harris
- Home stadium: Paladin Stadium

2020 Southern Conference football standings
	Conf.			Overall
Team	W		L	W		L
No. 11 VMI $^	6	–	1	6	–	2
No. 22 East Tennessee State	4	–	2	4	–	2
Chattanooga†	3	–	1	3	–	2
Mercer	5	–	3	5	–	6
Samford	4	–	3	4	–	3
Furman	3	–	4	3	–	4
Wofford†	1	–	4	1	–	4
The Citadel	2	–	6	2	–	10
Western Carolina	1	–	5	1	–	8
$ – Conference champion; ^ – FCS playoff participant; † – Chattanooga and Wofford opted out of the remainder of the spring season on March 29 and April 5, 2021, respectively.; Rankings from STATS Poll

The 2020 Furman Paladins football team represented Furman University as a member of the Southern Conference (SoCon) during the 2020–21 NCAA Division I FCS football season. Led by fourth-year head coach Clay Hendrix, the Paladins compiled an overall record of 3–4 with an identical mark in conference play, placing sixth in the SoCon. Furman home games at Paladin Stadium in Greenville, South Carolina.

== Schedule ==
Furman had a game scheduled against Tennessee, which was canceled due to the COVID-19 pandemic.

Date	Time	Opponent	Rank	Site	TV	Result	Attendance
February 20	2:00 p.m.	Western Carolina	No. 15	Paladin Stadium; Greenville, SC	ESPN+	W 35–7	1,994
February 27	1:30 p.m.	at VMI	No. 10	Alumni Memorial Stadium; Lexington, VA	ESPN+	L 13–14	250
March 6	1:00 p.m.	Samford	No. 17	Paladin Stadium; Greenville, SC	ESPN+	W 44–37 ^{OT}	2,102
March 13	1:00 p.m.	at East Tennessee State	No. 15	William B. Greene Jr. Stadium; Johnson City, TN	ESPN+	W 17–13	2,173
March 20	1:00 p.m.	No. 11 Chattanooga	No. 13	Paladin Stadium; Greenville, SC	ESPN+	L 18–20	2,102
April 3	3:30 p.m.	at Mercer	No. 21	Five Star Stadium; Macon, GA		L 14–26	3,627
April 10	1:00 p.m.	at The Citadel		Johnson Hagood Stadium; Charleston, SC (rivalry)	ESPN+	L 7–26	3,081
April 17	1:00 p.m.	Wofford		Paladin Stadium; Greenville, SC (rivalry)	ESPN+	Canceled (Note: On April 5, 2021, Wofford announced that it was opting out of the remainder of the spring 2021 season as a result of injuries and player opt-outs due to COVID-19.)	
Rankings from STATS Poll released prior to the game; All times are in Eastern time
