= 2020 VMI Keydets football team =

Virginia Military Institute in the 2020 NCAA Division I FCS football season

2020 VMI Keydets football

SoCon champion

NCAA Division I First Round, L 24–31 vs. James Madison
- Conference: Southern Conference

Ranking
- STATS: No. 12
- FCS Coaches: No. 12
- Record: 6–2 (6–1 SoCon)
- Head coach: Scott Wachenheim (6th season)
- Offensive coordinator: Billy Cosh (1st season)
- Defensive coordinator: Tom Clark (6th season)
- Home stadium: Alumni Memorial Field

2020 Southern Conference football standings
	Conf.			Overall
Team	W		L	W		L
No. 11 VMI $^	6	–	1	6	–	2
No. 22 East Tennessee State	4	–	2	4	–	2
Chattanooga†	3	–	1	3	–	2
Mercer	5	–	3	5	–	6
Samford	4	–	3	4	–	3
Furman	3	–	4	3	–	4
Wofford†	1	–	4	1	–	4
The Citadel	2	–	6	2	–	10
Western Carolina	1	–	5	1	–	8
$ – Conference champion; ^ – FCS playoff participant; † – Chattanooga and Wofford opted out of the remainder of the spring season on March 29 and April 5, 2021, respectively.; Rankings from STATS Poll

The 2020 VMI Keydets football team represented the Virginia Military Institute in the 2020–21 NCAA Division I FCS football season. It was VMI's 130th football season. The Keydets were led by sixth-year head coach Scott Wachenheim. They played their home games at 10,000–seat Alumni Memorial Field at Foster Stadium. They are a member of the Southern Conference (SoCon).

On April 17, 2021, VMI defeated The Citadel 31–17 in the Military Classic of the South, retaining the Silver Shako, and winning their first Southern Conference Football Championship since 1977. Upon winning the Southern Conference title, the Keydets were awarded the conference's automatic bid to the FCS Playoffs, VMI's first appearance. The Keydets lost in the first round at James Madison, 31–24.

== Schedule ==
VMI had a game scheduled against Princeton, which was canceled before the start of the 2020 season.

Date	Time	Opponent	Rank	Site	TV	Result	Attendance
~~February 20~~		~~at Chattanooga~~		~~Finley Stadium~~; ~~Chattanooga, TN~~		Canceled (Note: On March 29, 2021, Chattanooga announced that it would opt out of the remainder of the 2021 spring season due to safety concerns related to the COVID-19 pandemic.)	
February 27	1:30 p.m.	No. 10 Furman		Alumni Memorial Field; Lexington, VA	ESPN+	W 14–13	250
March 6	1:00 p.m.	at Western Carolina		E. J. Whitmire Stadium; Cullowhee, NC	ESPN+	W 30–7	1300
March 13	1:30 p.m.	Mercer		Alumni Memorial Field; Lexington, VA	ESPN+	W 41–14	1000
March 20	1:00 p.m.	at Samford	No. 19	Seibert Stadium; Homewood, AL	ESPN+	W 38–37 ^{OT}	1156
March 27	1:00 p.m.	at Wofford	No. 14	Gibbs Stadium; Spartanburg, SC	ESPN+	W 36–31	1159
April 3	1:30 p.m.	East Tennessee State	No. 10	Alumni Memorial Field; Lexington, VA	ESPN+	L 20–24	3000
April 17	1:30 p.m.	The Citadel	No. 15	Alumni Memorial Field; Lexington, VA (Military Classic of the South)	ESPN+	W 31–17	3000
April 24	2:00 p.m.	at No. 1 James Madison	No. 11	Bridgeforth Stadium; Harrisonburg, VA (FCS Playoffs First Round)	ESPN3	L 24–31	6011
Rankings from STATS Poll released prior to the game; All times are in Eastern time
