= 2020 Samford Bulldogs football team =

American college football season

2020 Samford Bulldogs football
- Conference: Southern Conference
- Record: 4–3 (4–3 SoCon)
- Head coach: Chris Hatcher (6th season)
- Offensive coordinator: Derrick Sherman (1st season)
- Offensive scheme: Air raid
- Defensive coordinator: Nick Benedetto (1st season)
- Base defense: 4–2–5
- Home stadium: Seibert Stadium

2020 Southern Conference football standings
	Conf.			Overall
Team	W		L	W		L
No. 11 VMI $^	6	–	1	6	–	2
No. 22 East Tennessee State	4	–	2	4	–	2
Chattanooga†	3	–	1	3	–	2
Mercer	5	–	3	5	–	6
Samford	4	–	3	4	–	3
Furman	3	–	4	3	–	4
Wofford†	1	–	4	1	–	4
The Citadel	2	–	6	2	–	10
Western Carolina	1	–	5	1	–	8
$ – Conference champion; ^ – FCS playoff participant; † – Chattanooga and Wofford opted out of the remainder of the spring season on March 29 and April 5, 2021, respectively.; Rankings from STATS Poll

The 2020 Samford Bulldogs football team represented Samford University in the 2020–21 NCAA Division I FCS football season. They were led by sixth-year head coach Chris Hatcher and played their home games at Seibert Stadium. They played as a member of the Southern Conference (SoCon).

== Schedule ==
Samford had a game scheduled against Florida State, which was canceled due to the COVID-19 pandemic.

Date	Time	Opponent	Site	TV	Result	Attendance
February 20	12:00 p.m.	at East Tennessee State	William B. Greene Jr. Stadium; Johnson City, TN	ESPN+	L 17–24	2106
February 27	1:00 p.m.	Western Carolina	Seibert Stadium; Homewood, AL	ESPN+	W 55–27	1276
March 6	1:00 p.m.	at No. 17 Furman	Paladin Stadium; Greenville, SC	ESPN+	L 37–44 ^{OT}	2102
March 13	1:00 p.m.	No. 20 Wofford	Seibert Stadium; Homewood, AL	ESPN+	W 37–31	1176
March 20	1:00 p.m.	No. 19 VMI	Seibert Stadium; Homewood, AL	ESPN+	L 37–38 ^{OT}	1156
March 27	1:00 p.m.	at The Citadel	Johnson Hagood Stadium; Charleston, SC	ESPN+	W 55–7	3081
~~April 10~~	~~2:00 p.m.~~	~~at Chattanooga~~	~~Finley Stadium~~; ~~Chattanooga, TN~~	~~ESPN+~~	Canceled (Note: On March 29, 2021, Chattanooga announced that it would opt out of the remainder of the 2021 spring season due to safety concerns related to the COVID-19 pandemic.)	
April 17	1:00 p.m.	No. 23 Mercer	Seibert Stadium; Homewood, AL	ESPN+	W 44–20	1176
Rankings from STATS Poll released prior to the game; All times are in Central time
