= 2018 Western Carolina Catamounts football team =

American college football season

2018 Western Carolina Catamounts football
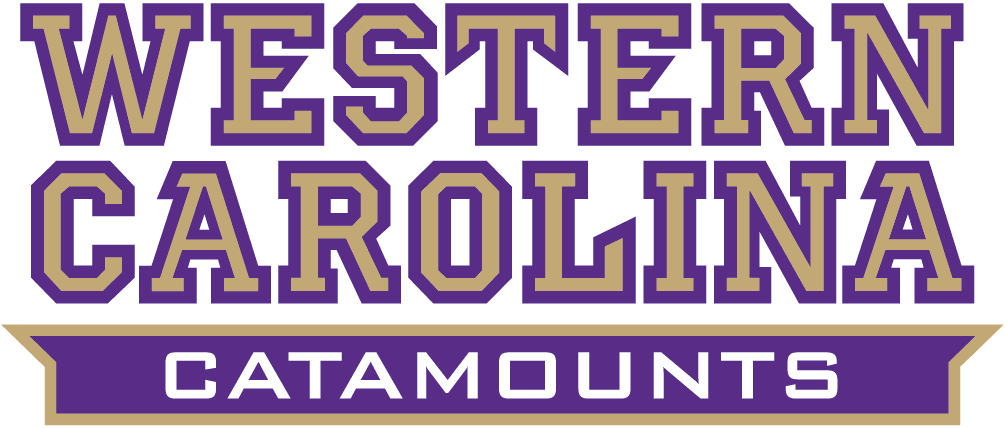
- Conference: Southern Conference
- Record: 3–8 (1–7 SoCon)
- Head coach: Mark Speir (7th season)
- Offensive coordinator: Brad Glenn (7th season)
- Offensive scheme: Spread
- Defensive coordinator: John Wiley (2nd season)
- Base defense: 3–4
- Home stadium: Bob Waters Field at E. J. Whitmire Stadium

2018 Southern Conference football standings
	Conf.			Overall
Team	W		L	W		L
No. 13 Wofford +^	6	–	2	9	–	4
No. 22 East Tennessee State +^	6	–	2	8	–	4
Furman +	6	–	2	6	–	4
Samford	5	–	3	6	–	5
Chattanooga	4	–	4	6	–	5
The Citadel	4	–	4	5	–	6
Mercer	4	–	4	5	–	6
Western Carolina	1	–	7	3	–	8
VMI	0	–	8	1	–	10
+ – Conference co-champions; ^ – FCS playoff participant; Rankings from STATS Poll

The 2018 Western Carolina Catamounts team represented Western Carolina University as a member of the Southern Conference (SoCon) during the 2018 NCAA Division I FCS football season. Led by seventh-year head coach Mark Speir, the Catamounts compiled an overall record of 3–8 with a mark of 1–7 in conference play, placing eighth in the SoCon. Western Carolina played home games at Bob Waters Field at E. J. Whitmire Stadium in Cullowhee, North Carolina.

== Preseason ==
=== Award watch lists ===
Award	Player	Position	Year
Walter Payton Award	Tyrie Adams	QB	JR
Buck Buchanan Award	Marvin Tillman	S	SR

=== Preseason media poll ===
The SoCon released their preseason media poll on July 25, 2018, with the Catamounts predicted to finish in fifth place. The same day the coaches released their preseason poll with the Catamounts predicted to finish in fourth place.

==== Preseason All-SoCon Teams ====
The Catamounts placed six players on the preseason all-SoCon teams.

Offense

1st team

Zach Weeks – OL

2nd team

Tyrie Adams – QB

Nathan Dalton – OL

Andrew Miles – OL

Defense

1st team

Marvin Tillman – DB

Specialists

1st team

Ian Berryman – P

== Schedule ==
Date	Time	Opponent	Site	TV	Result	Attendance
September 1	6:00 p.m.	Newberry*	Bob Waters Field at E. J. Whitmire Stadium; Cullowhee, NC	ESPN+	W 33–26	12,111
September 14 (Note: This game was originally scheduled for September 15. It was moved up one day in anticipation of Hurricane Florence.)	6:00 p.m.	at Gardner–Webb*	Ernest W. Spangler Stadium; Boiling Springs, NC	ESPN+	W 28–10	2,257
September 22	3:30 p.m.	VMI	Bob Waters Field at E. J. Whitmire Stadium; Cullowhee, NC	ESPN+	W 52–50	12,759
September 29	2:00 p.m.	at Furman	Paladin Stadium; Greenville, SC	ESPN+	L 38–44	7,201
October 6	1:30 p.m.	at Samford	Seibert Stadium; Homewood, AL	ESPN3	L 28–66	3,178
October 13	3:30 p.m.	Chattanooga	Bob Waters Field at E. J. Whitmire Stadium; Cullowhee, NC	ESPN+	L 6–26	7,362
October 20	4:00 p.m.	at Mercer	Five Star Stadium; Macon, GA	ESPN+	L 46–59	8,230
October 27	3:30 p.m.	at No. 25 East Tennessee State	William B. Greene Jr. Stadium; Johnson City, TN	ESPN+	L 43–45 ^{3OT}	7,121
November 3	3:30 p.m.	The Citadel^{†}	Bob Waters Field at E. J. Whitmire Stadium; Cullowhee, NC	ESPN+	L 24–38	10,499
November 10	3:30 p.m.	No. 15 Wofford	Bob Waters Field at E. J. Whitmire Stadium; Cullowhee, NC	ESPN3	L 23–38	10,169
November 17	3:00 p.m.	at North Carolina*	Kenan Memorial Stadium; Chapel Hill, NC	ACCN Extra	L 26–49	41,151
*Non-conference game; ^{†}Homecoming; Rankings from STATS Poll released prior to the game; All times are in Eastern time

== Game summaries ==
=== Newberry ===
	1	2	3	4	Total
Wolves	7	10	3	6	26
Catamounts	3	16	0	14	33

=== At Gardner–Webb ===
	1	2	3	4	Total
Catamounts	7	14	0	7	28
Runnin' Bulldogs	7	3	0	0	10

=== VMI ===
	1	2	3	4	Total
Keydets	14	10	13	13	50
Catamounts	14	7	21	10	52

=== At Furman ===
	1	2	3	4	Total
Catamounts	7	3	14	14	38
Paladins	14	17	7	6	44

=== At Samford ===
	1	2	3	4	Total
Catamounts	0	21	0	7	28
Bulldogs	35	7	14	10	66

=== Chattanooga ===
	1	2	3	4	Total
Mocs	9	10	7	0	26
Catamounts	0	3	0	3	6

=== At Mercer ===
	1	2	3	4	Total
Catamounts	7	20	6	13	46
Bears	0	28	17	14	59

=== At East Tennessee State ===
	1	2	3	4	OT	2OT	3OT	Total
Catamounts	0	13	10	7	0	7	6	43
No. 25 Buccaneers	6	6	3	15	0	7	8	45

=== The Citadel ===
	1	2	3	4	Total
Bulldogs	7	3	14	14	38
Catamounts	10	14	0	0	24

=== Wofford ===
	1	2	3	4	Total
No. 15 Terriers	7	7	14	10	38
Catamounts	10	10	0	3	23

=== At North Carolina ===
	1	2	3	4	Total
Catamounts	7	9	3	7	26
Tar Heels	14	21	14	0	49
