= 2018 Mercer Bears football team =

American college football season

2018 Mercer Bears football
- Conference: Southern Conference
- Record: 5–6 (4–4 SoCon)
- Head coach: Bobby Lamb (6th season)
- Offensive coordinator: Joe Pizzo (1st season)
- Defensive coordinator: Mike Kolakowski (6th season)
- Home stadium: Five Star Stadium

2018 Southern Conference football standings
	Conf.			Overall
Team	W		L	W		L
No. 13 Wofford +^	6	–	2	9	–	4
No. 22 East Tennessee State +^	6	–	2	8	–	4
Furman +	6	–	2	6	–	4
Samford	5	–	3	6	–	5
Chattanooga	4	–	4	6	–	5
The Citadel	4	–	4	5	–	6
Mercer	4	–	4	5	–	6
Western Carolina	1	–	7	3	–	8
VMI	0	–	8	1	–	10
+ – Conference co-champions; ^ – FCS playoff participant; Rankings from STATS Poll

The 2018 Mercer Bears football team represented Mercer University as a member the Southern Conference (SoCon) during the 2018 NCAA Division I FCS football season. They were led by sixth-year head coach Bobby Lamb and played their home games at the Five Star Stadium in Macon, Georgia. Mercer finished the season 5–6 overall and 4–4 in SoCon play to place in a three-way tie for fifth.

== Preseason ==
=== Preseason media poll ===
The SoCon released their preseason media poll on July 25, 2018, with the Bears predicted to finish in fourth place. The same day the coaches released their preseason poll with the Bears predicted to finish in sixth place.

==== Preseason All-SoCon Teams ====
The Bears placed eight players on the preseason all-SoCon teams.

Offense

1st team

Austin Sanders – OL

Sam Walker – TE

Marquise Irvin – WR

2nd team

Tee Mitchell – RB

Defense

1st team

LeMarkus Bailey – LB

2nd team

Isaiah Buehler – DL

Eric Jackson – DB

Specialists

2nd team

Matt Shiel – P

== Schedule ==
Date	Time	Opponent	Site	TV	Result	Attendance
September 1	7:00 p.m.	at Memphis*	Liberty Bowl Memorial Stadium; Memphis, TN	ESPN3	L 14–66	33,697
September 8	6:00 p.m.	Jacksonville*	Five Star Stadium; Macon, GA	ESPN3	W 45–3	10,200
September 15	3:00 p.m.	at No. 9 Samford	Seibert Stadium; Homewood, AL	ESPN+	W 30–24	8,717
September 22	4:00 p.m.	The Citadel	Five Star Stadium; Macon, GA	ESPN+	L 31–38	11,772
September 29	1:30 p.m.	at VMI	Alumni Memorial Field; Lexington, VA	ESPN3	W 48–38	3,251
October 13	1:00 p.m.	at Yale*	Yale Bowl; New Haven, CT	ESPN+	L 28–35	2,861
October 20	4:00 p.m.	Western Carolina	Five Star Stadium; Macon, GA	ESPN+	W 59–46	8,230
October 27	1:30 p.m.	at No. 9 Wofford	Gibbs Stadium; Spartanburg, SC	ESPN3	L 21–42	6,374
November 3	3:00 p.m.	East Tennessee State^{†}	Five Star Stadium; Macon, GA	ESPN+	L 18–21	10,002
November 10	1:00 p.m.	at Chattanooga	Finley Stadium; Chattanooga, TN	ESPN+	W 13–9	8,014
November 17	3:00 p.m.	Furman	Five Star Stadium; Macon, GA	ESPN+	L 30–35	8,811
*Non-conference game; ^{†}Homecoming; Rankings from STATS Poll released prior to the game; All times are in Eastern time

== Game summaries ==
=== At Memphis ===
	1	2	3	4	Total
Bears	0	0	0	14	14
Tigers	28	28	0	10	66

=== Jacksonville ===
	1	2	3	4	Total
Dolphins	0	0	0	3	3
Bears	7	24	14	0	45

=== At Samford ===
	1	2	3	4	Total
Bears	7	10	0	13	30
No. 9 Bulldogs	7	0	7	10	24

=== The Citadel ===
	1	2	3	4	Total
Bulldogs	7	7	3	21	38
Bears	7	10	7	7	31

=== At VMI ===
	1	2	3	4	Total
Bears	13	14	14	7	48
Keydets	7	13	0	18	38

=== At Yale ===
	1	2	3	4	Total
Bears	0	14	7	7	28
Bulldogs	14	14	0	7	35

=== Western Carolina ===
	1	2	3	4	Total
Catamounts	7	20	6	13	46
Bears	0	28	17	14	59

=== At Wofford ===
	1	2	3	4	Total
Bears	0	0	7	14	21
No. 9 Terriers	0	14	14	14	42

=== East Tennessee State ===
	1	2	3	4	Total
Buccaneers	0	14	7	0	21
Bears	7	3	5	3	18

=== At Chattanooga ===
	1	2	3	4	Total
Bears	0	0	0	13	13
Mocs	0	0	3	6	9

=== Furman ===
	1	2	3	4	Total
Paladins	7	13	9	6	35
Bears	7	3	14	6	30
