= 2018 Wofford Terriers football team =

American college football season

2018 Wofford Terriers football

SoCon co-champion

FCS Second Round, L 10–13 vs. Kennesaw State
- Conference: Southern Conference

Ranking
- STATS: No. 13
- FCS Coaches: No. 12
- Record: 9–4 (6–2 SoCon)
- Head coach: Josh Conklin (1st season)
- Offensive coordinator: Wade Lang (31st season)
- Defensive coordinator: Sam Siefkes (1st season)
- Home stadium: Gibbs Stadium

2018 Southern Conference football standings
	Conf.			Overall
Team	W		L	W		L
No. 13 Wofford +^	6	–	2	9	–	4
No. 22 East Tennessee State +^	6	–	2	8	–	4
Furman +	6	–	2	6	–	4
Samford	5	–	3	6	–	5
Chattanooga	4	–	4	6	–	5
The Citadel	4	–	4	5	–	6
Mercer	4	–	4	5	–	6
Western Carolina	1	–	7	3	–	8
VMI	0	–	8	1	–	10
+ – Conference co-champions; ^ – FCS playoff participant; Rankings from STATS Poll

The 2018 Wofford Terriers football team represented Wofford College in the 2018 NCAA Division I FCS football season. They were led by first-year head coach Josh Conklin and played their home games at Gibbs Stadium. They were a member of the Southern Conference. They finished the season 9–4, 6–2 in SoCon play to finish in a tie for the SoCon championship alongside East Tennessee State and Furman. They received the automatic bid to the FCS Playoffs, where they defeated Elon in the first round before losing in the second round to Kennesaw State.

== Preseason ==
=== Award watch lists ===
Award	Player	Position	Year
Buck Buchanan Award	Miles Brown	DL	SR

=== Preseason media poll ===
The SoCon released their preseason media poll on July 25, 2018, with the Terriers predicted to finish in third place. The same day the coaches released their preseason poll with the Terriers predicted to finish in second place.

==== Preseason All-SoCon Teams ====
The Terriers placed nine players at ten positions on the preseason all-SoCon teams.

Offense

1st team

Andre Stoddard – RB

Michael Ralph – OL

2nd team

Justus Basinger – OL

Defense

1st team

Miles Brown – DL

Datavious Wilson – LB

Devin Watson – DB

2nd team

Mikel Horton – DL

Mason Alstatt – DB

Specialists

1st team

Luke Carter – K

2nd team

Luke Carter – P

== Schedule ==
Date	Time	Opponent	Rank	Site	TV	Result	Attendance
September 1	6:00 p.m.	The Citadel	No. 10	Gibbs Stadium; Spartanburg, SC (rivalry)	WYCW	W 28–21	8,930
September 8	6:00 p.m.	VMI	No. 8	Gibbs Stadium; Spartanburg, SC	WYCW	W 59–14	4,957
September 15	4:00 p.m.	at Wyoming*	No. 8	War Memorial Stadium; Laramie, WY	MW Net	L 14–17	20,293
September 29	6:00 p.m.	at Gardner–Webb*	No. 7	Ernest W. Spangler Stadium; Boiling Springs, NC	ESPN+	W 45–14	2,850
October 6	3:00 p.m.	at Chattanooga	No. 7	Finley Stadium; Chattanooga, TN	ESPN+	W 21–10	8,010
October 13	1:00 p.m.	at Furman	No. 6	Paladin Stadium; Greenville, SC (rivalry)	WYCW	L 14–34	7,006
October 20	1:30 p.m.	No. 21 East Tennessee State^{†}	No. 12	Gibbs Stadium; Spartanburg, SC	ESPN+	W 30–17	6,745
October 27	1:30 p.m.	Mercer	No. 9	Gibbs Stadium; Spartanburg, SC	WYCW	W 42–21	6,374
November 3	3:00 p.m.	at Samford	No. 9	Seibert Stadium; Homewood, AL	ESPN+	L 20–35	5,821
November 10	3:30 p.m.	at Western Carolina	No. 15	E. J. Whitmire Stadium; Cullowhee, NC	ESPN3	W 38–23	10,169
November 17	1:30 p.m.	Presbyterian*	No. 13	Gibbs Stadium; Spartanburg, SC	WYCW	W 45–21	5,674
November 24	2:00 p.m.	No. 17 Elon*	No. 13	Gibbs Stadium; Spartanburg, SC (NCAA Division I First Round)	ESPN3	W 19–7	2,157
December 1	2:00 p.m.	at No. 2 Kennesaw State*	No. 13	Fifth Third Bank Stadium; Kennesaw, GA (NCAA Division I Second Round)	ESPN3	L 10–13	3,515
*Non-conference game; ^{†}Homecoming; Rankings from STATS Poll released prior to the game; All times are in Eastern time

== Game summaries ==
=== The Citadel ===
	1	2	3	4	Total
Bulldogs	0	7	14	0	21
No. 10 Terriers	14	7	0	7	28

=== VMI ===
	1	2	3	4	Total
Keydets	0	7	0	7	14
No. 8 Terriers	21	21	17	0	59

=== At Wyoming ===
	1	2	3	4	Total
No. 8 Terriers	0	7	0	7	14
Cowboys	0	10	0	7	17

=== At Gardner–Webb ===
	1	2	3	4	Total
No. 7 Terriers	14	10	7	14	45
Runnin' Bulldogs	0	7	7	0	14

=== At Chattanooga ===
	1	2	3	4	Total
No. 7 Terriers	7	7	0	7	21
Mocs	10	0	0	0	10

=== At Furman ===
	1	2	3	4	Total
No. 6 Terriers	0	7	7	0	14
Paladins	14	7	6	7	34

=== East Tennessee State ===
	1	2	3	4	Total
No. 21 Buccaneers	0	10	0	7	17
No. 12 Terriers	3	14	7	6	30

=== Mercer ===
	1	2	3	4	Total
Bears	0	0	7	14	21
No. 9 Terriers	0	14	14	14	42

=== At Samford ===
	1	2	3	4	Total
No. 9 Terriers	7	10	3	0	20
Bulldogs	14	7	0	14	35

=== At Western Carolina ===
	1	2	3	4	Total
No. 15 Terriers	7	7	14	10	38
Catamounts	10	10	0	3	23

=== Presbyterian ===
	1	2	3	4	Total
Blue Hose	14	0	0	7	21
No. 13 Terriers	7	21	7	10	45

== FCS Playoffs ==
=== Elon–First Round ===
	1	2	3	4	Total
No. 17 Phoenix	0	7	0	0	7
No. 13 Terriers	3	3	10	3	19

=== At Kennesaw State–Second Round ===
	1	2	3	4	Total
No. 13 Terriers	0	10	0	0	10
No. 2 Owls	0	10	0	3	13

== Ranking movements ==
Ranking movements Legend: ██ Increase in ranking ██ Decrease in ranking т = Tied with team above or below
	Week													
Poll	Pre	1	2	3	4	5	6	7	8	9	10	11	12	Final
STATS FCS	10	8	8	8	7	7	6	12	9	9	15	13	13	13
Coaches	11	7	7	6–T	6	6	4	12	7	8	14	14	12	12
