= 2018 The Citadel Bulldogs football team =

American college football season

2018 The Citadel Bulldogs football
- Conference: Southern Conference
- Record: 5–6 (4–4 SoCon)
- Head coach: Brent Thompson (3rd season)
- Offensive coordinator: Lou Conte (3rd season)
- Offensive scheme: Triple option
- Defensive coordinator: Blake Harrell (3rd season)
- Base defense: 4–3
- Home stadium: Johnson Hagood Stadium

2018 Southern Conference football standings
	Conf.			Overall
Team	W		L	W		L
No. 13 Wofford +^	6	–	2	9	–	4
No. 22 East Tennessee State +^	6	–	2	8	–	4
Furman +	6	–	2	6	–	4
Samford	5	–	3	6	–	5
Chattanooga	4	–	4	6	–	5
The Citadel	4	–	4	5	–	6
Mercer	4	–	4	5	–	6
Western Carolina	1	–	7	3	–	8
VMI	0	–	8	1	–	10
+ – Conference co-champions; ^ – FCS playoff participant; Rankings from STATS Poll

The 2018 The Citadel Bulldogs football team represented The Citadel, The Military College of South Carolina in the 2018 NCAA Division I FCS football season. The Bulldogs were led by third-year head coach Brent Thompson and played their home games at Johnson Hagood Stadium. They were members of the Southern Conference (SoCon). They finished the season 5–6, 4–4 in SoCon play to finish in a three-way tie for fifth place.

== Preseason ==
=== Preseason media poll ===
The SoCon released their preseason media poll on July 25, 2018, with the Bulldogs predicted to finish in seventh place. The same day the coaches released their preseason poll with the Bulldogs also predicted to finish in seventh place.

=== Preseason All-SoCon Teams ===
The Bulldogs placed five players on the preseason all-SoCon teams.

Offense

1st team

Tyler Davis – OL

2nd team

Drew McEntyre – OL

Defense

1st team

Aron Spann III – RB

2nd team

Ja'Lon Williams – DL

Noah Dawkins – LB

== Schedule ==
Date	Time	Opponent	Site	TV	Result	Attendance
September 1	6:00 p.m.	at No. 10 Wofford	Gibbs Stadium; Spartanburg, SC (rivalry)	ESPN+	L 21–28	8,930
September 8	6:00 p.m.	Chattanooga	Johnson Hagood Stadium; Charleston, SC	ESPN+	L 28–29 ^{OT}	8,076
September 22	4:00 p.m.	at Mercer	Moye Complex; Macon, GA	ESPN+	W 38–31	11,772
September 29	4:00 p.m.	at No. 25 Towson*	Johnny Unitas Stadium; Towson, MD	CAA.tv	L 27–44	7,323
October 13	2:00 p.m.	No. 23 East Tennessee State	Johnson Hagood Stadium; Charleston, SC	ESPN3	L 23–26	11,043
October 20	1:30 p.m.	at VMI	Alumni Memorial Field; Lexington, VA (Military Classic of the South)	ESPN3	W 34–32	7,002
October 27	2:00 p.m.	Furman	Johnson Hagood Stadium; Charleston, SC (rivalry)	ESPN+	L 17–28	8,574
November 3	3:30 p.m.	at Western Carolina	E. J. Whitmire Stadium; Cullowhee, NC	ESPN+	W 38–24	10,499
November 10	2:00 p.m.	Samford^{†}	Johnson Hagood Stadium; Charleston, SC	ESPN+	W 42–27	11,145
November 17	12:00 p.m.	at No. 1 Alabama*	Bryant–Denny Stadium; Tuscaloosa, AL (FBS)	SECN	L 17–50	101,681
November 29 (Note: This game was originally scheduled for September 15, but it was rescheduled in anticipation of Hurricane Florence.)	7:00 p.m.	Charleston Southern*	Johnson Hagood Stadium; Charleston, SC	ESPN+	W 43–14	7,877
*Non-conference game; ^{†}Homecoming; Rankings from STATS Poll released prior to the game; All times are in Eastern time

== Roster ==
2018 The Citadel Bulldogs football team roster
Players
Coaches
Offense

Pos.	#	Name	Class
RB	2	Rod Johnson	Jr
FB	5	Clay Harris	Fr
FB	8	Lorenzo Ward	Jr
QB	10	Jordan Black	Jr
QB	12	Ryan McCarthy	Fr
WR	13	Cole Owens	Fr
QB	15	Jalen Smith	Fr
QB	16	Brandon Rainey	So
FB	18	Dante Smith	Fr
QB	19	Javonte Middleton	Fr
QB	19	Brian Murdaugh	So
WR	21	Curt Nixon	Jr
WR	22	Raleigh Webb	So
RB	23	Keefe White	Fr
RB	26	Keyonte Sessions	So
RB	28	Nkem Njoku	Fr
RB	29	Grant Drakeford	Sr
FB	32	Emeka Nwanze	Fr
FB	34	Sam Llewellyn	Fr
RB	39	Dexter Freeman	Fr
FB	42	Brandon Berry	So
FB	43	Hoss Smith	So
TE	44	Jordan Thomas	Jr
OL	52	Jon Barrett Lewis	So
OL	53	Tyler Davis	Sr
OL	54	Haden Haas	Fr
OL	56	Ronald Prince	Fr
OL	57	Blake Harrison	Fr
OL	58	Denzel Wright	So
OL	59	Kevin Wilson	Fr
OL	61	Mark Weakland	So
OL	62	Jonathan Cole	So
OL	63	Drew McIntyre	Jr
OL	64	Harry Easler	Jr
OL	65	Johnathan Toole	Fr
OL	67	Prince Howard-Whitaker	So
OL	69	Tyrell Earl	Fr
OL	71	Charley Conley	So
OL	73	Patrick Ivey	Fr
OL	74	Nick Hudgens	So
OL	75	Tanner Lawson	Fr
OL	76	Donnie Brechtell III	Fr
OL	77	Palmer Story	Fr
OL	78	Thomas Crawford	Fr
WR	81	Dijon Profit	So
WR	82	Rashad Riley	So
WR	83	Cardan Williams	So
WR	84	Liam Reid	Fr
WR	87	Cameron Roberts	Fr
TE	89	Attorney Gallman	Jr
WR		Damian Crowson	Fr
RB		Stephon Eugene	So
QB		Darique Hampton	Fr
WR		Carter Moody	Fr
OL		Nick Pappas	Fr
WR		Kevin Williams	Fr
TE		Jeffrey Wood	Fr

Defense

Pos.	#	Name	Class
DB	3	Joshua Bowers	Fr
LB	4	Phil Davis	Jr
DB	6	Lane Botkin	Fr
DB	7	Khafari Buffalo	Jr
LB	9	Willie Eubanks	So
DB	11	Phil Barrett	So
DB	17	Christ Beverly	Fr
DB	20	Jay Howard	Fr
DB	24	Aron Spann III	Sr
LB	25	Sean-Thomas Faulkner	Fr
DB	27	Jaylan Adams	Fr
DB	30	Cliff Barrett II	Sr
LB	31	Von Ramsey	Fr
DB	33	Ronald Peterkin	Sr
LB	35	Brian Horn	Fr
LB	36	Joe Douglas	Fr
DB	37	Destin Mack	Fr
LB	38	Noah Dawkins	Sr
DB	39	Ryland Ayers	Fr
LB	40	Jordan Williams	Jr
LB	41	Kyler Estes	Fr
DB	45	Marvin Marshall	Fr
LB	46	Isaac Stewart	Sr
DL	48	Gunner Covey	So
DL	49	Marquise Blount	Fr
LB	50	Caleb Deveaux	Fr
LB	55	Russell Hubbs	Sr
DL	60	Adam Wawrynski	Jr
DL	66	Jay Smith	Fr
DL	68	Ken Allen	Sr
DL	70	Mason Kinsey	Fr
DL	72	Dalton Owens	Fr
DL	79	Noah Mills	Fr
DL	88	Shawn McCord	Sr
DL	91	Bradley Cooper	Jr
DL	92	Aaron Brawley	So
DL	95	Blake Oliveira	Fr
DL	96	Jalon Williams	Jr
DL	97	Jabauri Garner	Fr
DL	98	Joseph Randolph II	Jr
DL	99	Christian Weyrich	Fr
LB		Cody Green	Fr
DB		Daniel Haydel	So
DB		Nic Trocha	Jr
LB		Eric Vettel	So

Special teams

Pos.	#	Name	Class
K	69	Joshua Roides	So
LS	70	Collin Flanders	Fr
LS	85	Patrick Keefe	Sr
K	86	Jacob Godek	Jr
K	90	Matt Campbell	Fr
P	93	Gage Russell	So

Head coach

- Brent Thompson (3rd season)

Coordinators/assistant coaches

- Blake Harrell – Defensive Coordinator / Linebackers
- Lou Conte - Offensive Coordinator / QBs / B-Backs
- J.P. Gunter - Special Teams / A-Backs
- Ron Boyd - Offensive Line
- Charles Hopkins - Offensive Tackles
- Orlando Mitjans Jr. - Cornerbacks
- Brian Rucker - Wide Receivers
- Joel Taylor - Defensive Passing Game Coordinator / Safeties
- John Ward - Defensive Line / Academic Coordinator
- Scott Yielding - Outside Linebackers / Recruiting Coordinator
- Donnell Boucher - Strength and Conditioning
- Will Hornsby - Special Teams Quality Control
- Colton Korn - Special Teams and Recruiting Quality Control
- Bobby Ruff - Defensive Quality Control
- Floris Mendonca - Video Coordinator
- Kate Yeager - Director of Personnel

Legend

- (C) Team captain
- (S) Suspended
- (I) Ineligible
- Injured
- Redshirt

Roster
Last update: August 6, 2020

== Game summaries ==
=== At Wofford ===
	1	2	3	4	Total
Bulldogs	0	7	14	0	21
No. 10 Terriers	14	7	0	7	28

=== Chattanooga ===
	1	2	3	4	OT	Total
Mocs	14	7	0	0	8	29
Bulldogs	0	14	7	0	7	28

=== At Mercer ===
	1	2	3	4	Total
Bulldogs	7	7	3	21	38
Bears	7	10	7	7	31

=== At Towson ===
	1	2	3	4	Total
Bulldogs	3	7	14	3	27
No. 25 Tigers	7	17	17	3	44

=== East Tennessee State ===
	1	2	3	4	Total
No. 23 Buccaneers	3	6	7	10	26
Bulldogs	6	3	0	14	23

=== At VMI ===
	1	2	3	4	Total
Bulldogs	7	7	14	6	34
Keydets	7	7	6	12	32

=== Furman ===
	1	2	3	4	Total
Paladins	7	7	0	14	28
Bulldogs	3	7	7	0	17

=== At Western Carolina ===
	1	2	3	4	Total
Bulldogs	7	3	14	14	38
Catamounts	10	14	0	0	24

=== Samford ===
	1	2	3	4	Total
SAM Bulldogs	14	10	3	0	27
CIT Bulldogs	0	7	14	21	42

=== At Alabama ===
	1	2	3	4	Total
Bulldogs	0	10	0	0	10
Crimson Tide	7	3	27	13	50

=== Charleston Southern ===
	1	2	3	4	Total
Buccaneers	0	14	0	0	14
Bulldogs	14	23	3	3	43
