= 2018 VMI Keydets football team =

American college football season

2018 VMI Keydets football
- Conference: Southern Conference
- Record: 1–10 (0–8 SoCon)
- Head coach: Scott Wachenheim (4th season)
- Offensive coordinator: Brian Sheppard (1st season)
- Defensive coordinator: Tom Clark (4th season)
- Base defense: 3–4
- Home stadium: Alumni Memorial Field

2018 Southern Conference football standings
	Conf.			Overall
Team	W		L	W		L
No. 13 Wofford +^	6	–	2	9	–	4
No. 22 East Tennessee State +^	6	–	2	8	–	4
Furman +	6	–	2	6	–	4
Samford	5	–	3	6	–	5
Chattanooga	4	–	4	6	–	5
The Citadel	4	–	4	5	–	6
Mercer	4	–	4	5	–	6
Western Carolina	1	–	7	3	–	8
VMI	0	–	8	1	–	10
+ – Conference co-champions; ^ – FCS playoff participant; Rankings from STATS Poll

The 2018 VMI Keydets football team represented the Virginia Military Institute in the 2018 NCAA Division I FCS football season. It was VMI's 128th football season. The Keydets were led by fourth-year head coach Scott Wachenheim. They played their home games at 10,000–seat Alumni Memorial Field at Foster Stadium. They were a member of the Southern Conference (SoCon). They finished the season 1–10, 0–8 in SoCon play to finish in last place.

== Preseason ==
=== Preseason media poll ===
The SoCon released their preseason media poll on July 25, 2018, with the Keydets predicted to finish in last place. The same day the coaches released their preseason poll with the Keydets also predicted to finish in last place.

==== Preseason All-SoCon teams ====
The Keydets placed one player on the preseason all-SoCon teams.

Offense

2nd team

Brad Davis – OL

== Schedule ==
Date	Time	Opponent	Site	TV	Result	Attendance
September 1	7:00 p.m.	at Toledo*	Glass Bowl; Toledo, OH	ESPN3	L 3–66	24,136
September 8	6:00 p.m.	at No. 8 Wofford	Gibbs Stadium; Spartanburg, SC	ESPN+	L 14–59	4,957
September 14 (Note: This game was originally scheduled for September 15. It was moved up one day in anticipation of Hurricane Florence.)	2:30 p.m.	East Tennessee State	Alumni Memorial Field; Lexington, VA	ESPN+	L 24–27	2,764
September 22	3:30 p.m.	at Western Carolina	E. J. Whitmire Stadium; Cullowhee, NC	ESPN+	L 50–52	12,759
September 29	1:30 p.m.	Mercer	Alumni Memorial Field; Lexington, VA	ESPN3	L 38–48	3,251
October 13	2:00 p.m.	at Samford	Seibert Stadium; Homewood, AL	ESPN+	L 22–73	4,163
October 20	1:30 p.m.	The Citadel	Alumni Memorial Field; Lexington, VA (Military Classic of the South)	ESPN3	L 32–34	7,002
October 27	3:00 p.m.	at Chattanooga	Finley Stadium; Chattanooga, TN	ESPN+	L 27–34	8,201
November 3	1:30 p.m.	Tusculum*	Alumni Memorial Field; Lexington, VA	ESPN+	W 20–11	3,617
November 10	1:30 p.m.	Furman	Alumni Memorial Field; Lexington, VA	ESPN+	L 13–49	3,922
November 17	2:00 p.m.	at Old Dominion*	Foreman Field; Norfolk, VA (Oyster Bowl)	ESPN+	L 14–77	20,118
*Non-conference game; Rankings from STATS Poll released prior to the game; All times are in Eastern time

== Game summaries ==
=== At Toledo ===
	1	2	3	4	Total
Keydets	0	3	0	0	3
Rockets	21	21	21	3	66

=== At Wofford ===
	1	2	3	4	Total
Keydets	0	7	0	7	14
No. 8 Terriers	21	21	17	0	59

=== East Tennessee State ===
	1	2	3	4	Total
Buccaneers	7	6	7	7	27
Keydets	0	17	7	0	24

=== At Western Carolina ===
	1	2	3	4	Total
Keydets	14	10	13	13	50
Catamounts	14	7	21	10	52

=== Mercer ===
	1	2	3	4	Total
Bears	13	14	14	7	48
Keydets	7	13	0	18	38

=== At Samford ===
	1	2	3	4	Total
Keydets	9	13	0	0	22
Bulldogs	14	28	24	7	73

=== The Citadel ===
	1	2	3	4	Total
Bulldogs	7	7	14	6	34
Keydets	7	7	6	12	32

=== At Chattanooga ===
	1	2	3	4	Total
Keydets	14	7	0	6	27
Mocs	7	14	6	7	34

=== Tusculum ===
	1	2	3	4	Total
Pioneers	0	3	0	8	11
Keydets	0	7	7	6	20

=== Furman ===
	1	2	3	4	Total
Paladins	21	14	14	0	49
Keydets	7	0	0	6	13

=== At Old Dominion ===
	1	2	3	4	Total
Keydets	0	0	14	0	14
Monarchs	21	28	14	14	77
