= 2020 Western Carolina Catamounts football team =

American college football season

2020 Western Carolina Catamounts football
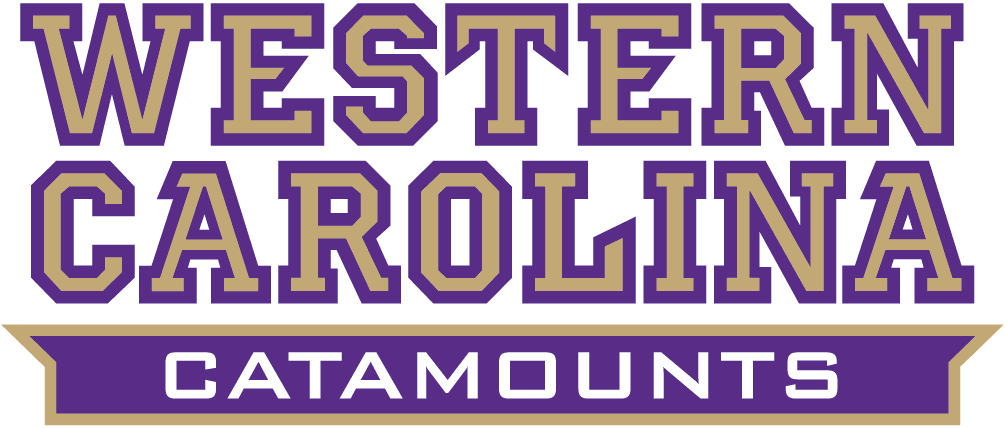
- Conference: Southern Conference
- Record: 1–8 (1–5 SoCon)
- Head coach: Mark Speir (9th season)
- Offensive coordinator: John Holt (2nd season)
- Defensive coordinator: Andy McCollum (1st season)
- Home stadium: Bob Waters Field at E. J. Whitmire Stadium

2020 Southern Conference football standings
	Conf.			Overall
Team	W		L	W		L
No. 11 VMI $^	6	–	1	6	–	2
No. 22 East Tennessee State	4	–	2	4	–	2
Chattanooga†	3	–	1	3	–	2
Mercer	5	–	3	5	–	6
Samford	4	–	3	4	–	3
Furman	3	–	4	3	–	4
Wofford†	1	–	4	1	–	4
The Citadel	2	–	6	2	–	10
Western Carolina	1	–	5	1	–	8
$ – Conference champion; ^ – FCS playoff participant; † – Chattanooga and Wofford opted out of the remainder of the spring season on March 29 and April 5, 2021, respectively.; Rankings from STATS Poll

The 2020 Western Carolina Catamounts team represented Western Carolina University as a member of the Southern Conference (SoCon) during the 2020–21 NCAA Division I FCS football season. Led by Mark Speir in his ninth and final season as head coach, the Catamounts compiled an overall record of 1–8 with a mark of 1–5 in conference play, placing last out of nine teams in the SoCon. Western Carolina played home games at Bob Waters Field at E. J. Whitmire Stadium in Cullowhee, North Carolina.

== Schedule ==
Date	Time	Opponent	Site	TV	Result	Attendance
November 14	12:00 p.m.	at No. 22 (FBS) Liberty*	Williams Stadium; Lynchburg, VA	ESPNU	L 14–58	1,000
November 21	3:00 p.m.	at Eastern Kentucky*	Roy Kidd Stadium; Richmond, KY	ESPN3	L 17–49	3009
December 5	12:00 p.m.	at No. 17 (FBS) North Carolina*	Kenan Memorial Stadium; Chapel Hill, NC	ACCN	L 9–49	3535
February 20	2:00 p.m.	at No. 15 Furman	Paladin Stadium; Greenville, SC	ESPN+	L 7–35	1994
February 27	1:00 p.m.	at Samford	Seibert Stadium; Homewood, AL	ESPN+	L 27–55	1276
March 6	1:00 p.m.	VMI	Bob Waters Field at E. J. Whitmire Stadium; Cullowhee, NC	ESPN+	L 7–30	1300
March 13	1:00 p.m.	The Citadel	Bob Waters Field at E. J. Whitmire Stadium; Cullowhee, NC	ESPN+	W 21–14	980
March 20	3:30 p.m.	at Mercer	Five Star Stadium; Macon, GA	ESPN+	L 28–45	3527
March 27	1:00 p.m.	at East Tennessee State	William B. Greene Jr. Stadium; Johnson City, TN	ESPN+	L 17–24	2442
April 3	1:00 p.m.	Chattanooga	Bob Waters Field at E. J. Whitmire Stadium; Cullowhee, NC	ESPN+	Canceled (Note: On March 29, 2021, Chattanooga announced that it would opt out of the remainder of the 2021 spring season due to safety concerns related to the COVID-19 pandemic.)	
April 10	2:00 p.m.	Wofford	Bob Waters Field at E. J. Whitmire Stadium; Cullowhee, NC	ESPN+	Canceled (Note: On April 5, 2021, Wofford announced that it was opting out of the remainder of the spring 2021 season as a result of injuries and player opt-outs due to COVID-19.)	
*Non-conference game; Rankings from STATS Poll released prior to the game; All times are in Eastern time
