= Rusty Wright =

American football coach

Current position
- Title: Head coach
- Team: Chattanooga
- Conference: SoCon
- Record: 49–38

Biographical details
- Born: Aiken, South Carolina, U.S.

Playing career
- 1992–1995: Chattanooga
- Position: Tight end

Coaching career (HC unless noted)
- 1996–2002: Chattanooga (assistant)
- 2004: Butler (DC)
- 2005–2008: Miami (OH) (assistant)
- 2009: Gardner–Webb (DL)
- 2010: Furman (LB)
- 2011–2012: Reinhardt (DC)
- 2013–2016: Chattanooga (LB/ST)
- 2017–2018: Georgia State (ILB/ST/RC)
- 2019–present: Chattanooga

Head coaching record
- Overall: 49–38
- Tournaments: 1-1 (NCAA Division I)

Rusty Wright is an American football coach. He is the head football coach at the University of Tennessee at Chattanooga, position he has held since 2019. Wright replaced Tom Arth, who left to be the head football coach at the University of Akron. Before being named the head coach at Chattanooga, Wright was a player and assistant coach at Chattanooga and was an assistant at Miami University, Butler University, Gardner–Webb University, Furman University, Reinhardt University, and Georgia State University.

== Head coaching record ==
Year	Team	Overall	Conference	Standing	Bowl/playoffs	Coaches^{#}	STATS^{°}
Chattanooga Mocs (Southern Conference) (2019–present)
2019	Chattanooga	6–6	5–3	3rd			
2020–21	Chattanooga	3–2	3–1	3rd			
2021	Chattanooga	6–5	5–3	3rd			
2022	Chattanooga	7–4	5–3	T–3rd		24	23
2023	Chattanooga	8–5	6–2	T–2nd	L NCAA Division I Second Round		
2024	Chattanooga	7–5	5–3	T-3rd			
2025	Chattanooga	5–7	4–4	T–5th			
2026	Chattanooga	7–4	6–2				
Chattanooga:		49–38	39–21				
Total:		49–38					
