= 2018 Sacred Heart Pioneers football team =

American college football season

2018 Sacred Heart Pioneers football

NEC co-champion
- Conference: Northeast Conference
- Record: 7–4 (5–1 NEC)
- Head coach: Mark Nofri (7th season)
- Offensive coordinator: Matt Gardner (2nd season)
- Defensive coordinator: Michael Cooke (2nd season)
- Home stadium: Campus Field

2018 Northeast Conference football standings
	Conf.			Overall
Team	W		L	W		L
No. 21 Duquesne +^	5	–	1	8	–	3
Sacred Heart +	5	–	1	7	–	4
Central Connecticut	4	–	2	6	–	5
Wagner	3	–	3	4	–	7
Saint Francis (PA)	2	–	4	4	–	7
Bryant	2	–	4	6	–	5
Robert Morris	0	–	6	2	–	9
+ – Conference co-champions; ^ – FCS playoff participant; Rankings from STATS Poll

The 2018 Sacred Heart Pioneers football team represented Sacred Heart University as a member of the Northeast Conference (NEC) during the 2018 NCAA Division I FCS football season. Led by seventh-year head coach Mark Nofri, the Pioneers compiled an overall record of 7–4 with a mark of 5–1 in conference play, sharing the NEC title with Duquesne. Due to a head-to-head win over Sacred Heart, Duquesne earned the NEC's automatic bid to the NCAA Division I Football Championship plays. The Pioneers did not received an at-large bid. Sacred Heart played home games at Campus Field in Fairfield, Connecticut.

== Preseason ==
=== NEC coaches poll ===
The NEC released their preseason coaches poll on July 24, 2018, with the Pioneers predicted to finish in sixth place. They did not place any players on the preseason all-NEC team.

== Schedule ==
Date	Time	Opponent	Site	Result	Attendance
September 1	6:00 p.m.	Lafayette*	Campus Field; Fairfield, CT	W 35–6	4,157
September 8	3:30 p.m.	at Bucknell*	Christy Mathewson–Memorial Stadium; Lewisburg, PA	W 30–14	1,872
September 22	6:00 p.m.	at Wagner	Wagner College Stadium; Staten Island, NY	W 41–14	3,178
September 29	1:00 p.m.	at Cornell*	Schoellkopf Field; Ithaca, NY	L 24–43	3,620
October 6	3:00 p.m.	Penn*^{†}	Campus Field; Fairfield, CT	L 27–31	4,503
October 13	6:00 p.m.	at Dartmouth*	Memorial Field; Hanover, NH	L 0–42	3,138
October 20	1:00 p.m.	at Central Connecticut	Arute Field; New Britain, CT	W 28–25	5,117
October 27	1:00 p.m.	Bryant	Campus Field; Fairfield, CT	W 49–26	1,678
November 3	12:00 p.m.	Robert Morris	Campus Field; Fairfield, CT	W 38–7	1,556
November 10	12:00 p.m.	at Duquesne	Arthur J. Rooney Athletic Field; Pittsburgh, PA	L 24–28	1,304
November 17	12:00 p.m.	Saint Francis (PA)	Campus Field; Fairfield, CT	W 13–7	1,852
*Non-conference game; ^{†}Homecoming; All times are in Eastern time

== Game summaries ==
=== Lafayette ===
	1	2	3	4	Total
Leopards	3	0	3	0	6
Pioneers	7	14	7	7	35

=== At Bucknell ===
	1	2	3	4	Total
Pioneers	7	7	7	9	30
Bison	0	14	0	0	14

=== At Wagner ===
	1	2	3	4	Total
Pioneers	7	21	6	7	41
Seahawks	0	7	7	0	14

=== At Cornell ===
	1	2	3	4	Total
Pioneers	3	7	7	7	24
Big Red	16	20	7	0	43

=== Penn ===
	1	2	3	4	Total
Quakers	7	10	7	7	31
Pioneers	0	0	21	6	27

=== At Dartmouth ===
	1	2	3	4	Total
Pioneers	0	0	0	0	0
Big Green	21	14	7	0	42

=== At Central Connecticut ===
	1	2	3	4	Total
Pioneers	7	0	14	7	28
Blue Devils	3	14	0	8	25

=== Bryant ===
	1	2	3	4	Total
Bulldogs	14	6	0	6	26
Pioneers	14	13	13	9	49

=== Robert Morris ===
	1	2	3	4	Total
Colonials	0	0	7	0	7
Pioneers	21	14	0	3	38

=== At Duquesne ===
	1	2	3	4	Total
Pioneers	0	7	14	3	24
Dukes	14	7	7	0	28

=== Saint Francis (PA) ===
	1	2	3	4	Total
Red Flash	0	7	0	0	7
Pioneers	3	3	7	0	13
