= 2018 Central Connecticut Blue Devils football team =

American college football season

2018 Central Connecticut Blue Devils football
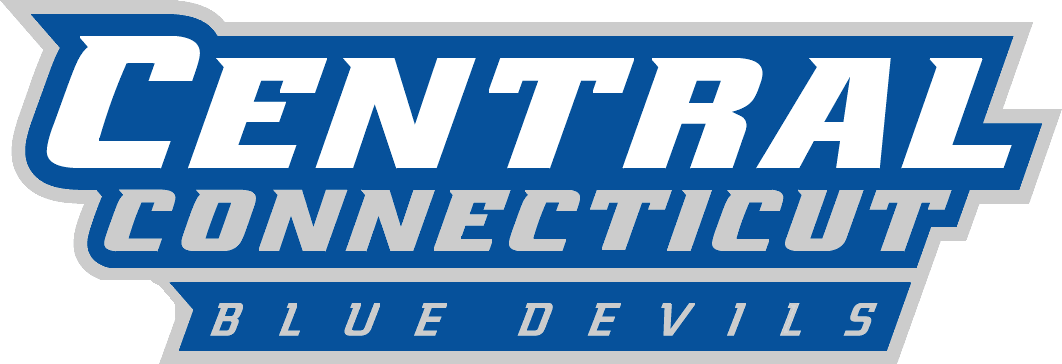
- Conference: Northeast Conference
- Record: 6–5 (4–2 NEC)
- Head coach: Pete Rossomando (5th season)
- Offensive coordinator: Ryan McCarthy
- Defensive coordinator: Andrew Christ
- Home stadium: Arute Field

2018 Northeast Conference football standings
	Conf.			Overall
Team	W		L	W		L
No. 21 Duquesne +^	5	–	1	8	–	3
Sacred Heart +	5	–	1	7	–	4
Central Connecticut	4	–	2	6	–	5
Wagner	3	–	3	4	–	7
Saint Francis (PA)	2	–	4	4	–	7
Bryant	2	–	4	6	–	5
Robert Morris	0	–	6	2	–	9
+ – Conference co-champions; ^ – FCS playoff participant; Rankings from STATS Poll

The 2018 Central Connecticut Blue Devils football team represented Central Connecticut State University in the 2018 NCAA Division I FCS football season. They were led by fifth-year head coach Pete Rossomando and played their home games at Arute Field. They were a member of the Northeast Conference. They finished the season 6–5, 4–2 in NEC play to finish in third place.

== Preseason ==
=== NEC coaches poll ===
The NEC released their preseason coaches poll on July 24, 2018, with the Blue Devils predicted to become NEC champions.

=== Preseason All-NEC team ===
The Blue Devils placed seven players on the preseason all-NEC team.

Offense

Jake Dolegala – QB

Arthur Gilmore – TE

J’Von Brown – OL

Connor Mignone – OL

Defense

Chris Tinkham – DL

Kenneth Keen – LB

Tajik Bagley – DB

== Schedule ==
Date	Time	Opponent	Site	TV	Result	Attendance
August 30	7:00 p.m.	at Ball State*	Scheumann Stadium; Muncie, IN	ESPN+	L 6–42	9,801
September 7	6:00 p.m.	Lincoln (PA)*	Arute Field; New Britain, CT	NECFR	W 55–0	5,115
September 15	5:00 p.m.	Columbia*	Arute Field; New Britain, CT	NECFR	L 24–41	3,789
September 22	1:00 p.m.	at Fordham*	Coffey Field; Bronx, NY	Stadium	W 24–13	7,134
September 29	6:00 p.m.	at Lafayette*	Fisher Stadium; Easton, PA	Stadium	L 24–31	5,295
October 6	Noon	at Robert Morris	Joe Walton Stadium; Moon Township, PA	NECFR	W 56–35	1,844
October 13	1:00 p.m.	at Bryant	Beirne Stadium; Smithfield, RI	NECFR	W 48–14	3,745
October 20	1:00 p.m.	Sacred Heart^{†}	Arute Field; New Britain, CT	ESPN3	L 25–28	5,117
October 27	12:00 p.m.	Wagner	Arute Field; New Britain, CT		W 49–24	852
November 10	12:00 p.m.	at Saint Francis	DeGol Field; Loretto, PA	ESPN3	W 30–14	912
November 17	12:00 p.m.	Duquesne	Arute Field; New Britain, CT		L 31–38	3,617
*Non-conference game; ^{†}Homecoming; All times are in Eastern time

== Game summaries ==
=== At Ball State ===
	1	2	3	4	Total
Blue Devils	0	0	0	6	6
Cardinals	7	14	14	7	42

=== Lincoln (PA) ===
	1	2	3	4	Total
Lions	0	0	0	0	0
Blue Devils	27	14	7	7	55

=== Columbia ===
	1	2	3	4	Total
Lions	14	3	10	14	41
Blue Devils	7	7	0	10	24

=== At Fordham ===
	1	2	3	4	Total
Blue Devils	10	7	7	0	24
Rams	0	6	7	0	13

=== At Lafayette ===
	1	2	3	4	Total
Blue Devils	7	10	0	7	24
Leopards	7	7	7	10	31

=== At Robert Morris ===
	1	2	3	4	Total
Blue Devils	21	14	7	14	56
Colonials	14	7	14	0	35

=== At Bryant ===
	1	2	3	4	Total
Blue Devils	6	14	8	20	48
Bulldogs	14	0	0	0	14

=== Sacred Heart ===
	1	2	3	4	Total
Pioneers	7	0	14	7	28
Blue Devils	3	14	0	8	25

=== Wagner ===
	1	2	3	4	Total
Seahawks	14	3	7	0	24
Blue Devils	14	7	7	21	49

=== At Saint Francis (PA) ===
	1	2	3	4	Total
Blue Devils	0	14	7	9	30
Red Flashes	7	0	0	7	14

=== Duquesne ===
	1	2	3	4	Total
Dukes	7	14	7	10	38
Blue Devils	14	3	7	7	31
