= 2018 Saint Francis Red Flash football team =

American college football season

2018 Saint Francis Red Flash football
- Conference: Northeast Conference
- Record: 4–7 (2–4 NEC)
- Head coach: Chris Villarrial (9th season)
- Offensive coordinator: Eric Long
- Defensive coordinator: Marco Pecora
- Home stadium: DeGol Field

2018 Northeast Conference football standings
	Conf.			Overall
Team	W		L	W		L
No. 21 Duquesne +^	5	–	1	8	–	3
Sacred Heart +	5	–	1	7	–	4
Central Connecticut	4	–	2	6	–	5
Wagner	3	–	3	4	–	7
Saint Francis (PA)	2	–	4	4	–	7
Bryant	2	–	4	6	–	5
Robert Morris	0	–	6	2	–	9
+ – Conference co-champions; ^ – FCS playoff participant; Rankings from STATS Poll

The 2018 Saint Francis Red Flash football team represented Saint Francis University in the 2018 NCAA Division I FCS football season. They were led by ninth-year head coach Chris Villarrial and played their home games at DeGol Field. They were a member of the Northeast Conference. They finished the season 4–7, 2–4 in NEC play to finish in a tie for fifth place.

== Preseason ==
=== Award watch lists ===
Award	Player	Position	Year
Walter Payton Award	Kamron Lewis	WR	SR

=== NEC coaches poll ===
The NEC released their preseason coaches poll on July 24, 2018, with the Red Flash predicted to finish in fourth place.

=== Preseason All-NEC team ===
The Red Flash placed five players on the preseason all-NEC team.

Offense

Kamron Lewis – WR

Mederick Flavius– OL

Defense

Hakeem Kinard – DB

Nick Rinella – DB

Special teams

Andrew Zecca – P

== Schedule ==
Date	Time	Opponent	Site	TV	Result	Attendance
September 1	12:30 p.m.	at Lehigh*	Goodman Stadium; Bethlehem, PA	Stadium	L 19–21	4,216
September 8	12:00 p.m.	Delaware State*	DeGol Field; Loretto, PA	NECFR	W 45–14	1,074
September 13 (Note: This game was originally scheduled as home game for Richmond at Robins Stadium. It was moved to DeGol Filed and moved up two days in anticipation of Hurricane Florence.)	5:00 p.m.	Richmond*	DeGol Field; Loretto, PA	NECFR	L 27–35	1,234
September 22	7:00 p.m.	at Albany*	Bob Ford Field at Tom & Mary Casey Stadium; Albany, NY	UAlbany Live Events	L 28–35	3,840
September 29	4:00 p.m.	West Virginia Wesleyan*	DeGol Field; Loretto, PA	NECFR	W 59–3	1,563
October 13	12:00 p.m.	at Wagner	Wagner College Stadium; Staten Island, NY	ESPN3	L 22–23	1,438
October 20	12:00 p.m.	Duquesne^{†}	DeGol Field; Loretto, PA	NECFR	L 20–27	1,532
October 27	12:00 p.m.	at Robert Morris	Joe Walton Stadium; Moon Township, PA	NECFR	W 20–7	1,359
November 3	12:00 p.m.	Bryant	DeGol Field; Loretto, PA	NECFR	W 27–14	1,489
November 10	12:00 p.m.	Central Connecticut	DeGol Field; Loretto, PA	ESPN3	L 14–30	912
November 17	12:00 p.m.	at Sacred Heart	Campus Field; Fairfield, CT	NECFR	L 7–13	1,852
*Non-conference game; ^{†}Homecoming; All times are in Eastern time

== Game summaries ==
=== At Lehigh ===
	1	2	3	4	Total
Red Flash	7	3	3	6	19
Mountain Hawks	0	14	7	0	21

=== Delaware State ===
	1	2	3	4	Total
Hornets	7	7	0	0	14
Red Flash	28	0	17	0	45

=== Richmond ===
	1	2	3	4	Total
Spiders	2	7	3	23	35
Red Flash	0	3	17	7	27

=== At Albany ===
	1	2	3	4	Total
Red Flash	7	7	14	0	28
Great Danes	7	13	8	7	35

=== West Virginia Wesleyan ===
	1	2	3	4	Total
Bobcats	0	0	0	3	3
Red Flash	21	21	3	14	59

=== At Wagner ===
	1	2	3	4	Total
Red Flash	0	0	7	15	22
Seahawks	3	7	6	7	23

=== Duquesne ===
	1	2	3	4	Total
Dukes	0	6	7	14	27
Red Flash	10	3	7	0	20

=== At Robert Morris ===
	1	2	3	4	Total
Red Flash	0	13	7	0	20
Colonials	0	0	0	7	7

=== Bryant ===
	1	2	3	4	Total
Bulldogs	0	14	0	0	14
Red Flash	17	7	0	3	27

=== Central Connecticut ===
	1	2	3	4	Total
Blue Devils	0	14	7	9	30
Red Flash	7	0	0	7	14

=== At Sacred Heart ===
	1	2	3	4	Total
Red Flash	0	7	0	0	7
Pioneers	3	3	7	0	13
