= 2018 Valparaiso Crusaders football team =

American college football season

2018 Valparaiso Crusaders football
- Conference: Pioneer Football League
- Record: 2–9 (2–6 PFL)
- Head coach: Dave Cecchini (5th season)
- Offensive coordinator: Jason Miran (5th season)
- Defensive coordinator: Ernest Moore (5th season)
- Home stadium: Brown Field

2018 Pioneer Football League standings
	Conf.			Overall
Team	W		L	W		L
No. 25 San Diego $^	8	–	0	9	–	3
Stetson	6	–	2	8	–	2
Drake	6	–	2	7	–	4
Marist	5	–	3	5	–	6
Dayton	5	–	3	6	–	5
Davidson	3	–	5	6	–	5
Butler	2	–	6	4	–	7
Morehead State	2	–	6	3	–	8
Valparaiso	2	–	6	2	–	9
Jacksonville	1	–	7	2	–	8
$ – Conference champion; ^ – FCS playoff participant; Rankings from STATS Poll

The 2018 Valparaiso Crusaders football team represented Valparaiso University in the 2018 NCAA Division I FCS football season. They were led by fifth-year head coach Dave Cecchini and played their home games at Brown Field. They competed in the Pioneer Football League. They finished the season 2–9, 2–6 in PFL play to finish in a three-way tie for seventh place.

== Preseason ==
=== Preseason All-PFL team ===
The PFL released their preseason all-PFL team on July 30, 2018, with the Crusaders having three players selected.

Offense

Tom Schofield – OL

Defense

Nick Turner – LB

Special teams

Bailey Gessinger – RET

=== Preseason coaches poll ===
The PFL released their preseason coaches poll on July 31, 2018, with the Crusaders predicted to finish in a tie for fourth place.

== Schedule ==
Date	Time	Opponent	Site	TV	Result	Attendance
September 8	11:00 a.m.	at Duquesne*	Rooney Field; Pittsburgh, PA	NECFR	L 21–23	943
September 15	1:00 p.m.	at Youngstown State*	Stambaugh Stadium; Youngstown, OH	ESPN+	L 7–42	14,913
September 22	1:00 p.m.	Truman State*	Brown Field; Valparaiso, IN	ESPN3	L 20–34	1,840
September 29	1:00 p.m.	Davidson	Brown Field; Valparaiso, IN	ESPN3	L 35–40	4,605
October 6	12:00 p.m.	at Dayton	Welcome Stadium; Dayton, OH	Facebook Live	L 20–53	2,592
October 13	1:00 p.m.	Butler	Brown Field; Valparaiso, IN (Hoosier Helmet Trophy)	ESPN+	W 35–17	1,724
October 20	1:00 p.m.	at Morehead State	Jayne Stadium; Morehead, KY	ESPN+	L 24–31	8,145
October 27	1:00 p.m.	Drake	Brown Field; Valparaiso, IN	ESPN+	L 25–42	1,945
November 3	11:00 a.m.	at Marist	Tenney Stadium at Leonidoff Field; Poughkeepsie, NY	Red Fox Network	L 24–35	1,227
November 10	12:00 p.m.	Jacksonville	Brown Field; Valparaiso, IN	ESPN+	W 48–30	1,150
November 17	12:00 p.m.	at Stetson	Spec Martin Stadium; DeLand, FL	ESPN+	L 45–31	1,961
*Non-conference game; Rankings from STATS Poll released prior to the game; All times are in Central time

- Source: Schedule

== Game summaries ==
=== At Duquesne ===
Team	1	2	3	4	Total
Crusaders	0	14	0	7	21
• Dukes	7	0	10	6	23

- Date: September 8, 2018
- Location: Rooney Field • Pittsburgh, Pennsylvania
- Game start: 12:05 pm EDT
- Elapsed time: 2:28
- Game attendance: 943
- Game weather: Temperature: 60 °F (16 °C) • Weather: Rainy, cool • Wind: ENE 13 mph (21 km/h)
- Television network: NEC Front Row

=== At Youngstown State ===
Team	1	2	3	4	Total
Crusaders	7	0	0	0	7
• Penguins	7	14	14	7	42

- Date: September 15, 2018
- Location: Stambaugh Stadium • Youngstown, Ohio
- Game start: 2:05 pm EDT
- Elapsed time: 3:13
- Game attendance: 14,913
- Game weather: Temperature: 82 °F (28 °C) • Weather: Partly cloudy • Wind: E 5–10 mph (8.0–16.1 km/h)
- Referee: Andy Speciale
- Television network: ESPN+

=== Truman State ===
Team	1	2	3	4	Total
• Bulldogs	6	0	11	7	24
Crusaders	7	0	3	10	20

- Date: September 22, 2018
- Location: Brown Field • Valparaiso, Indiana
- Game start: 1:04 pm CDT
- Elapsed time: 2:58
- Game attendance: 1,840
- Game weather: Temperature: 65 °F (18 °C) • Weather: Sunny • Wind: E 9 mph (14 km/h)
- Referee: Aaron Adams
- TV announcers (ESPN3): Todd Ickow, Dave Huseman

=== Davidson ===
Homecoming

Team	1	2	3	4	Total
• Wildcats	14	20	0	6	40
Crusaders	14	7	7	7	35

- Date: September 29, 2018
- Location: Brown Field • Valparaiso, Indiana
- Game start: 1:04 pm CDT
- Game attendance: 4,605
- Game weather: Temperature: 62 °F (17 °C) • Weather: Partly cloudy • Wind: NE 3 mph (4.8 km/h)
- Referee: Marcel Kerr
- TV announcers (ESPN3): Todd Ickow, Dave Huseman

=== At Dayton ===
Team	1	2	3	4	Total
Crusaders	7	6	0	7	20
• Flyers	14	23	16	0	53

- Date: October 6, 2018
- Location: Welcome Stadium • Dayton, Ohio
- Game start: 1:07 pm EDT
- Elapsed time: 2:38
- Game attendance: 2,592
- Referee: Grant Henderson
- TV announcers (Facebook Live): Alex Mikos, Jason Phillips

=== Butler ===
Hoosier Helmet Trophy

Team	1	2	3	4	Total
Bulldogs	0	14	3	0	17
• Crusaders	14	0	7	14	35

- Date: October 13, 2018
- Location: Brown Field • Valparaiso, Indiana
- Game start: 1:04 pm CDT
- Elapsed time: 2:52
- Game attendance: 1,724
- Game weather: Temperature: 51 °F (11 °C) • Weather: Sunny • Wind: SW 10 mph (16 km/h)
- Referee: C. J. Jackson
- TV announcers (ESPN+): Todd Ickow, Dave Huseman

=== At Morehead State ===
Team	1	2	3	4	Total
Crusaders	0	7	0	17	24
• Eagles	0	21	7	3	31

- Date: October 20, 2018
- Location: Jayne Stadium • Morehead, Kentucky
- Game start: 1:05 pm CDT
- Elapsed time: 3:15
- Game attendance: 8,145
- Game weather: Temperature: 55 °F (13 °C) • Weather: Mostly rainy
- Referee: Lamar Gresham
- TV announcers (ESPN+): Chuck Mraz, Jason Blanton

=== Drake ===
Team	1	2	3	4	Total
• Bulldogs	7	14	0	21	42
Crusaders	3	0	7	15	25

- Date: October 27, 2018
- Location: Brown Field • Valparaiso, Indiana
- Game start: 1:04 pm CDT
- Elapsed time: 3:18
- Game attendance: 1,945
- Game weather: Temperature: 54 °F (12 °C) • Weather: Partly cloudy • Wind: N 10 mph (16 km/h)
- Referee: Andy Speciale
- TV announcers (ESPN+): Todd Ickow, Dave Huseman

=== At Marist ===
Team	1	2	3	4	Total
Crusaders	3	7	7	7	24
• Red Foxes	0	28	0	7	35

- Date: November 3, 2018
- Location: Leonidoff Field • Poughkeepsie, New York
- Game start: 12:05 pm EDT
- Elapsed time: 2:51
- Game attendance: 1,227
- Game weather: Temperature: 51 °F (11 °C) • Weather: Mostly cloudy, windy • Wind: W 14 mph (23 km/h)
- Referee: Tom Kichline
- TV announcers (Red Fox Network): Geoff Brault, Ed Weir

=== Jacksonville ===
Team	1	2	3	4	Total
Dolphins	0	10	7	13	30
• Crusaders	14	13	14	7	48

- Date: November 10, 2018
- Location: Brown Field • Valparaiso, Indiana
- Game start: 12:04 pm CST
- Game attendance: 1,150
- Game weather: Temperature: 29 °F (−2 °C) • Weather: Extremely cold • Wind: W 7 mph (11 km/h)
- Referee: Matt Packowski
- TV announcers (ESPN+): Todd Ickow, Dave Huseman

=== At Stetson ===
Team	1	2	3	4	Total
Crusaders	7	17	0	7	31
• Hatters	7	14	21	3	45

- Date: November 17, 2018
- Location: Spec Martin Stadium • DeLand, Florida
- Game start: 1:04 pm EST
- Elapsed time: 3:12
- Game attendance: 1,961
- Game weather: Temperature: 71 °F (22 °C) • Weather: Sunny • Wind: NE 7 mph (11 km/h)
- Referee: Terrance Lamar
- TV announcers (ESPN+): Evan Weston, Tom James
