= 2018 Bryant Bulldogs football team =

American college football season

2018 Bryant Bulldogs football
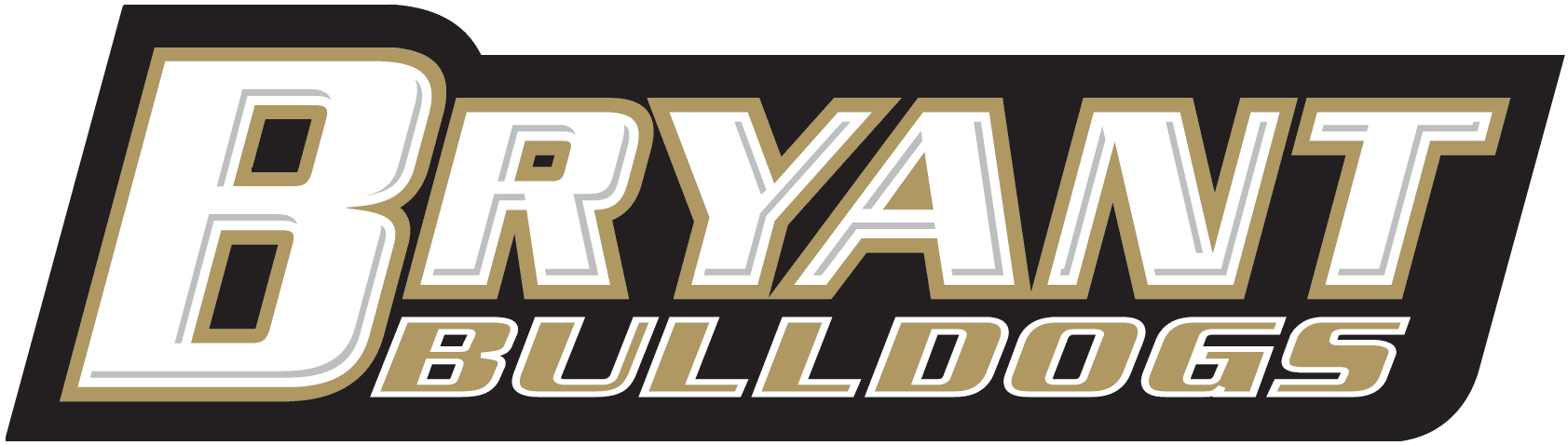
- Conference: Northeast Conference
- Record: 6–5 (2–4 NEC)
- Head coach: James Perry (2nd season)
- Offensive coordinator: Vinny Marino (2nd season)
- Defensive coordinator: Kevin Kelly (2nd season)
- Home stadium: Beirne Stadium

2018 Northeast Conference football standings
| | Conf. | | | Overall |
| Team | W | | L | W | | L |
|---|---|---|---|---|---|---|
| No. 21 Duquesne +^ | 5 | – | 1 | 8 | – | 3 |
| Sacred Heart + | 5 | – | 1 | 7 | – | 4 |
| Central Connecticut | 4 | – | 2 | 6 | – | 5 |
| Wagner | 3 | – | 3 | 4 | – | 7 |
| Saint Francis (PA) | 2 | – | 4 | 4 | – | 7 |
| Bryant | 2 | – | 4 | 6 | – | 5 |
| Robert Morris | 0 | – | 6 | 2 | – | 9 |
+ – Conference co-champions; ^ – FCS playoff participant; Rankings from STATS Poll

The 2018 Bryant Bulldogs football team represented Bryant University as a member of the Northeast Conference (NEC) during the 2018 NCAA Division I FCS football season. Led James Perry in his second and final season as head coach, the Bulldogs compiled an overall record of 6–5 with a mark of 2–4 in conference play, tying for fifth place in the NEC. Bryant played home games at Beirne Stadium in Smithfield, Rhode Island.

On December 3, Perry resigned to become the head football coach at Brown University. He finished his two-year tenure Bryant with a record of 12–10.

== Preseason ==
=== Award watch lists ===
| Award | Player | Position | Year |
|---|---|---|---|
| Buck Buchanan Award | Thomas Costigan | LB | SR |

=== NEC coaches poll ===
The NEC released their preseason coaches poll on July 24, 2018, with the Bulldogs predicted to finish in third place.

=== Preseason All-NEC team ===
The Bulldogs placed six players on the preseason all-NEC team.

Offense

Tom Kennedy – WR

Defense

Dillon Guthro – DL

Kevin Lazo – DL

Thomas Gostigan – LB

Special teams

Gavin Rowley – K

Jean Constant – RS

== Schedule ==
| Date | Time | Opponent | Site | TV | Result | Attendance |
|---|---|---|---|---|---|---|
| September 1 | 3:00 p.m. | New Haven* | Beirne Stadium; Smithfield, RI | NECFR | W 41–31 | 4,969 |
| September 8 | 6:00 p.m. | at No. 24 Stony Brook* | Kenneth P. LaValle Stadium; Stony Brook, NY | Wolfievision | L 21–50 | 5,708 |
| September 15 | 6:00 p.m. | Marist* | Beirne Stadium; Smithfield, RI | NECFR | W 37–27 | 3,673 |
| September 22 | 1:00 p.m. | Robert Morris^{†} | Beirne Stadium; Smithfield, RI | ESPN3 | W 49–46 | 3,792 |
| October 6 | 1:00 p.m. | at Duquesne | Arthur J. Rooney Athletic Field; Pittsburgh, PA | NECFR | W 21–20 | 2,145 |
| October 13 | 1:00 p.m. | Central Connecticut | Beirne Stadium; Smithfield, RI | NECFR | L 14–48 | 3,745 |
| October 20 | 1:00 p.m. | at Fordham* | Coffey Field; Bronx, NY | Stadium | W 42–41 | 1,906 |
| October 27 | 1:00 p.m. | at Sacred Heart | Campus Field; Fairfield, CT | ESPN3 | L 26–49 | 1,678 |
| November 3 | 12:00 p.m. | at Saint Francis (PA) | DeGol Field; Loretto, PA | NECFR | L 14–27 | 1,489 |
| November 10 | 1:00 p.m. | Wagner | Beirne Stadium; Smithfield, RI | NECFR | L 36–52 | 1,652 |
| November 17 | 1:00 p.m. | at Howard* | William H. Greene Stadium; Washington, DC | ESPN3 | W 56–55 | 3,974 |
*Non-conference game; ^{†}Homecoming; Rankings from STATS Poll released prior to the game; All times are in Eastern time

== Game summaries ==
=== New Haven ===
| | 1 | 2 | 3 | 4 | Total |
|---|---|---|---|---|---|
| Chargers | 7 | 6 | 3 | 15 | 31 |
| Bulldogs | 14 | 13 | 7 | 7 | 41 |

=== At Stony Brook ===
| | 1 | 2 | 3 | 4 | Total |
|---|---|---|---|---|---|
| Bulldogs | 0 | 7 | 14 | 0 | 21 |
| No. 24 Seawolves | 13 | 7 | 14 | 16 | 50 |

=== Marist ===
| | 1 | 2 | 3 | 4 | Total |
|---|---|---|---|---|---|
| Red Foxes | 7 | 6 | 7 | 7 | 27 |
| Bulldogs | 7 | 10 | 6 | 14 | 37 |

=== Robert Morris ===
| | 1 | 2 | 3 | 4 | Total |
|---|---|---|---|---|---|
| Colonials | 0 | 10 | 21 | 15 | 46 |
| Bulldogs | 14 | 14 | 14 | 7 | 49 |

=== At Duquesne ===
| | 1 | 2 | 3 | 4 | Total |
|---|---|---|---|---|---|
| Bulldogs | 7 | 7 | 7 | 0 | 21 |
| Dukes | 7 | 6 | 7 | 0 | 20 |

=== Central Connecticut ===
| | 1 | 2 | 3 | 4 | Total |
|---|---|---|---|---|---|
| Blue Devils | 6 | 14 | 8 | 20 | 48 |
| Bulldogs | 14 | 0 | 0 | 0 | 14 |

=== At Fordham ===
| | 1 | 2 | 3 | 4 | Total |
|---|---|---|---|---|---|
| Bulldogs | 21 | 0 | 12 | 9 | 42 |
| Rams | 3 | 17 | 14 | 7 | 41 |

=== At Sacred Heart ===
| | 1 | 2 | 3 | 4 | Total |
|---|---|---|---|---|---|
| Bulldogs | 14 | 6 | 0 | 6 | 26 |
| Pioneers | 14 | 13 | 13 | 9 | 49 |

=== At Saint Francis (PA) ===
| | 1 | 2 | 3 | 4 | Total |
|---|---|---|---|---|---|
| Bulldogs | 0 | 14 | 0 | 0 | 14 |
| Red Flash | 17 | 7 | 0 | 3 | 27 |

=== Wagner ===
| | 1 | 2 | 3 | 4 | Total |
|---|---|---|---|---|---|
| Seahawks | 10 | 21 | 14 | 7 | 52 |
| Bulldogs | 0 | 14 | 14 | 8 | 36 |

=== At Howard ===
| | 1 | 2 | 3 | 4 | Total |
|---|---|---|---|---|---|
| Bulldogs | 14 | 21 | 7 | 14 | 56 |
| Bison | 14 | 21 | 0 | 20 | 55 |
