= 2018 Drake Bulldogs football team =

American college football season

2018 Drake Bulldogs football
- Conference: Pioneer Football League
- Record: 7–4 (6–2 PFL)
- Head coach: Rick Fox (5th season)
- Defensive coordinator: Todd Stepsis (5th season)
- Home stadium: Drake Stadium

2018 Pioneer Football League standings
| | Conf. | | | Overall |
| Team | W | | L | W | | L |
|---|---|---|---|---|---|---|
| No. 25 San Diego $^ | 8 | – | 0 | 9 | – | 3 |
| Stetson | 6 | – | 2 | 8 | – | 2 |
| Drake | 6 | – | 2 | 7 | – | 4 |
| Marist | 5 | – | 3 | 5 | – | 6 |
| Dayton | 5 | – | 3 | 6 | – | 5 |
| Davidson | 3 | – | 5 | 6 | – | 5 |
| Butler | 2 | – | 6 | 4 | – | 7 |
| Morehead State | 2 | – | 6 | 3 | – | 8 |
| Valparaiso | 2 | – | 6 | 2 | – | 9 |
| Jacksonville | 1 | – | 7 | 2 | – | 8 |
$ – Conference champion; ^ – FCS playoff participant; Rankings from STATS Poll

The 2018 Drake Bulldogs football team represented Drake University as a member of the Pioneer Football League (PFL) during 2018 NCAA Division I FCS football season. Led by fifth-year head coach Rick Fox, the Bulldogs compiled an overall record of 7–4 with a mark of 6–2 in conference play, tying for second place in the PFL. The team played its home games at Drake Stadium in Des Moines, Iowa.

On December 10, Fox resigned. He finished his five-year tenure at Drake with a record of 33–22.

== Preseason ==
=== Preseason All-PFL team ===
The PFL released their preseason all-PFL team on July 30, 2018, with the Bulldogs having four players selected.

Offense

Steven Doran – WR

Jordan Lewinsky – OL

Defense

Nathan Clayberg – DL

Sean Lynch – DB

=== Preseason coaches poll ===
The PFL released their preseason coaches poll on July 31, 2018, with the Bulldogs predicted to finish in third place.

== Schedule ==
| Date | Time | Opponent | Site | TV | Result | Attendance |
|---|---|---|---|---|---|---|
| May 26 | 12:00 a.m. | at China All-Stars (AFLC, CAFL, & CBL)* | UIBE Stadium; Beijing, China (Drake-China Ambassadors Bowl) | QQLive | W 77–0 (Note: Exhibition game) | |
| September 1 | 6:00 p.m. | William Jewell* | Drake Stadium; Des Moines, IA | BV | Cancelled (Note: The season opening game vs. William Jewell was cancelled due to severe weather.) | |
| September 8 | 2:00 p.m. | at No. 14 Montana* | Washington–Grizzly Stadium; Missoula, MT | GoGriz | L 16–48 | 23,132 |
| September 15 | 1:00 p.m. | Missouri S&T* | Drake Stadium; Des Moines, IA | BV | W 52–12 | 1,881 |
| September 29 | 12:00 p.m. | at Jacksonville | D. B. Milne Field; Jacksonville, FL | ESPN3 | W 41–9 | 1,738 |
| October 6 | 1:00 p.m. | Butler | Drake Stadium; Des Moines, IA | BV | W 36–6 | 3,011 |
| October 13 | 1:00 p.m. | Stetson | Drake Stadium; Des Moines, IA | BV | L 21–23 | 1,439 |
| October 20 | 12:00 p.m. | at Dayton | Welcome Stadium; Dayton, OH (rivalry) | Facebook Live | W 28–17 | 2,168 |
| October 27 | 1:00 p.m. | at Valparaiso | Brown Field; Valparaiso, IN | ESPN+ | W 42–25 | 1,945 |
| November 3 | 1:00 p.m. | San Diego | Drake Stadium; Des Moines, IA | BV | L 10–27 | 1,522 |
| November 10 | 1:00 p.m. | Marist | Drake Stadium; Des Moines, IA | BV | W 13–10 | 1,348 |
| November 17 | 1:00 p.m. | at Morehead State | Jayne Stadium; Morehead, KY | ESPN+ | W 43–6 | 3,287 |
| December 1 (Note: This game was added on November 20, 2018 to make up for the cancellation of the season opener.) | 11:00 a.m. | at No. 24 (FBS) Iowa State | Jack Trice Stadium; Ames, IA | Cyclones.tv | L 24–27 | 56,738 |
*Non-conference game; Rankings from STATS Poll released prior to the game; All times are in Central time

== Game summaries ==
=== At Montana ===
| | 1 | 2 | 3 | 4 | Total |
|---|---|---|---|---|---|
| Bulldogs | 0 | 3 | 7 | 6 | 16 |
| No. 14 Grizzlies | 3 | 7 | 21 | 17 | 48 |

=== Missouri S&T ===
| | 1 | 2 | 3 | 4 | Total |
|---|---|---|---|---|---|
| Miners | 0 | 6 | 0 | 6 | 12 |
| Bulldogs | 14 | 14 | 14 | 10 | 52 |

=== At Jacksonville ===
| | 1 | 2 | 3 | 4 | Total |
|---|---|---|---|---|---|
| Bulldogs | 14 | 17 | 0 | 10 | 41 |
| Dolphins | 0 | 0 | 2 | 7 | 9 |

=== Butler ===
| | 1 | 2 | 3 | 4 | Total |
|---|---|---|---|---|---|
| BU Bulldogs | 0 | 0 | 0 | 6 | 6 |
| DU Bulldogs | 7 | 7 | 13 | 9 | 36 |

=== Stetson ===
| | 1 | 2 | 3 | 4 | Total |
|---|---|---|---|---|---|
| Hatters | 0 | 7 | 10 | 6 | 23 |
| Bulldogs | 3 | 0 | 11 | 7 | 21 |

=== At Dayton ===
| | 1 | 2 | 3 | 4 | Total |
|---|---|---|---|---|---|
| Bulldogs | 7 | 7 | 7 | 7 | 28 |
| Flyers | 7 | 3 | 0 | 7 | 17 |

=== At Valparaiso ===
| | 1 | 2 | 3 | 4 | Total |
|---|---|---|---|---|---|
| Bulldogs | 7 | 14 | 0 | 21 | 42 |
| Crusaders | 3 | 0 | 7 | 15 | 25 |

=== San Diego ===
| | 1 | 2 | 3 | 4 | Total |
|---|---|---|---|---|---|
| Toreros | 13 | 7 | 7 | 0 | 27 |
| Bulldogs | 0 | 7 | 3 | 0 | 10 |

=== Marist ===
| | 1 | 2 | 3 | 4 | Total |
|---|---|---|---|---|---|
| Red Foxes | 0 | 0 | 3 | 7 | 10 |
| Bulldogs | 3 | 0 | 0 | 10 | 13 |

=== At Morehead State ===
| | 1 | 2 | 3 | 4 | Total |
|---|---|---|---|---|---|
| Bulldogs | 9 | 13 | 7 | 14 | 43 |
| Eagles | 6 | 0 | 0 | 0 | 6 |

=== At Iowa State ===
| | 1 | 2 | 3 | 4 | Total |
|---|---|---|---|---|---|
| Bulldogs | 7 | 7 | 10 | 0 | 24 |
| No. 24 (FBS) Cyclones | 7 | 13 | 7 | 0 | 27 |
