= 2018 Dayton Flyers football team =

American college football season

2018 Dayton Flyers football
- Conference: Pioneer Football League
- Record: 6–5 (5–3 PFL)
- Head coach: Rick Chamberlin (11th season)
- Offensive coordinator: Austin King (2nd season)
- Defensive coordinator: Landon Fox (9th season)
- Home stadium: Welcome Stadium

2018 Pioneer Football League standings
	Conf.			Overall
Team	W		L	W		L
No. 25 San Diego $^	8	–	0	9	–	3
Stetson	6	–	2	8	–	2
Drake	6	–	2	7	–	4
Marist	5	–	3	5	–	6
Dayton	5	–	3	6	–	5
Davidson	3	–	5	6	–	5
Butler	2	–	6	4	–	7
Morehead State	2	–	6	3	–	8
Valparaiso	2	–	6	2	–	9
Jacksonville	1	–	7	2	–	8
$ – Conference champion; ^ – FCS playoff participant; Rankings from STATS Poll

The 2018 Dayton Flyers football team represented the University of Dayton as a member of the Pioneer Football League (PFL) during the 2018 NCAA Division I FCS football season. Led by 1-y1thear head coach Rick Chamberlin, the Flyers compiled an overall record of 6–5 with a mark of 5–3 in conference play, tying for fourth place in the PFL. Dayton played home games at Welcome Stadium in Dayton, Ohio.

== Preseason ==
=== Award watch lists ===
Lott Trophy – Sr. S David Leisring

=== Preseason All-PFL team ===
The PFL released their preseason all-PFL team on July 30, 2018, with the Flyers having seven players selected.

Offense

Adam Trautman – TE

Tucker Yinger – RB

Ben Gauthier – OL

Defense

Nick Surges – DL

David Leisring – DB

Special teams

Sean Smith – P

Matt Tunnacliffe – LS

=== Preseason coaches poll ===
The PFL released their preseason coaches poll on July 31, 2018, with the Flyers predicted to finish in second place.

== Schedule ==
Date	Time	Opponent	Site	TV	Result	Attendance
September 1	1:00 p.m.	Robert Morris*	Welcome Stadium; Dayton, OH	Facebook Live	W 49–28	3,012
September 8	1:00 p.m.	at Southeast Missouri State*	Houck Stadium; Cape Girardeau, MO	ESPN+	L 21–40	4,273
September 15	12:00 p.m.	at Duquesne*	Arthur J. Rooney Athletic Field; Pittsburgh, PA	NECFR	L 26–31	1,534
September 22	1:00 p.m.	Davidson	Welcome Stadium; Dayton, OH	Facebook Live	W 42–21	4,700
September 29	1:00 p.m.	at Marist	Tenney Stadium at Leonidoff Field; Poughkeepsie, NY		L 17–28	2,830
October 6	1:00 p.m.	Valparaiso	Welcome Stadium; Dayton, OH	Facebook Live	W 53–20	2,592
October 13	5:00 p.m.	at San Diego	Torero Stadium; San Diego, CA		L 36–34	2,997
October 20	1:00 p.m.	Drake	Welcome Stadium; Dayton, OH (rivalry)	Facebook Live	L 17–28	2,168
October 27	12:00 p.m.	at Butler	Bud and Jackie Sellick Bowl; Indianapolis, IN	Facebook Live	W 38–28	1,992
November 10	1:00 p.m.	Morehead State	Welcome Stadium; Dayton, OH	Facebook Live	W 63–20	2,325
November 17	1:00 p.m.	at Jacksonville	D. B. Milne Field; Jacksonville, FL		W 34–7	1,492
*Non-conference game; All times are in Eastern time

== Game summaries ==
=== Robert Morris ===
	1	2	3	4	Total
Colonials	7	7	7	7	28
Flyers	21	7	14	7	49

=== At Southeast Missouri State ===
	1	2	3	4	Total
Flyers	7	0	7	7	21
Redhawks	3	10	7	20	40

=== At Duquesne ===
	1	2	3	4	Total
Flyers	6	7	6	7	26
Dukes	14	10	7	0	31

=== Davidson ===
	1	2	3	4	Total
Wildcats	14	0	0	7	21
Flyers	0	14	21	7	42

=== At Marist ===
	1	2	3	4	Total
Flyers	0	7	10	0	17
Red Foxes	7	7	7	7	28

=== Valparaiso ===
	1	2	3	4	Total
Crusaders	7	6	0	7	20
Flyers	14	23	16	0	53

=== At San Diego ===
	1	2	3	4	Total
Flyers	7	7	7	13	34
Toreros	6	17	0	13	36

=== Drake ===
	1	2	3	4	Total
Bulldogs	7	7	7	7	28
Flyers	7	3	0	7	17

=== At Butler ===
	1	2	3	4	Total
Flyers	14	7	7	10	38
Bulldogs	0	7	6	15	28

=== Morehead State ===
	1	2	3	4	Total
Eagles	0	13	0	7	20
Flyers	21	21	14	7	63

=== At Jacksonville ===
	1	2	3	4	Total
Flyers	3	17	14	0	34
Dolphins	0	0	0	7	7
