= 2018 Robert Morris Colonials football team =

American college football season

2018 Robert Morris Colonials football
- Conference: Northeast Conference
- Record: 2–9 (0–6 NEC)
- Head coach: Bernard Clark (1st season)
- Offensive coordinator: Gabe Luvara (1st season)
- Defensive coordinator: Dave Plungas (1st season)
- Home stadium: Joe Walton Stadium

2018 Northeast Conference football standings
| | Conf. | | | Overall |
| Team | W | | L | W | | L |
|---|---|---|---|---|---|---|
| No. 21 Duquesne +^ | 5 | – | 1 | 8 | – | 3 |
| Sacred Heart + | 5 | – | 1 | 7 | – | 4 |
| Central Connecticut | 4 | – | 2 | 6 | – | 5 |
| Wagner | 3 | – | 3 | 4 | – | 7 |
| Saint Francis (PA) | 2 | – | 4 | 4 | – | 7 |
| Bryant | 2 | – | 4 | 6 | – | 5 |
| Robert Morris | 0 | – | 6 | 2 | – | 9 |
+ – Conference co-champions; ^ – FCS playoff participant; Rankings from STATS Poll

The 2018 Robert Morris Colonials football team represented Robert Morris University during the 2018 NCAA Division I FCS football season. They were led by first-year head coach Bernard Clark and played their home games at Joe Walton Stadium. They were a member of the Northeast Conference. They finished the season 2–9, 0–6 in NEC play to finish in last place.

== Preseason ==
=== NEC coaches poll ===
The NEC released their preseason coaches poll on July 24, 2018, with the Colonials predicted to finish in last place.

=== Preseason All-NEC team ===
The Colonials placed two players on the preseason all-NEC team.

Defense

Amir Fenwick – DL

Adam Wollet – LB

== Schedule ==
| Date | Time | Opponent | Site | TV | Result | Attendance |
|---|---|---|---|---|---|---|
| September 1 | 1:00 p.m. | at Dayton* | Welcome Stadium; Dayton, OH | Facebook Live | L 28–49 | 3,012 |
| September 8 | 12:00 p.m. | Virginia State* | Joe Walton Stadium; Moon Township, PA | NECFR | W 22–19 | 2,013 |
| September 13 | 7:30 p.m. (Note: Moved from Saturday at 6:00 p.m. in anticipation of Hurricane Florence.) | at No. 2 James Madison* | Bridgeforth Stadium; Harrisonburg, VA | Stretch Internet | L 7–73 | 18,112 |
| September 22 | 1:00 p.m. | at Bryant | Beirne Stadium; Smithfield, RI | ESPN3 | L 46–49 | 3,792 |
| October 6 | 1:00 p.m. | Central Connecticut^{†} | Joe Walton Stadium; Moon Township, PA | NECFR | L 35–56 | 1,844 |
| October 13 | 7:00 p.m. | at Duquesne | Arthur J. Rooney Athletic Field; Pittsburgh, PA | ESPN3 | L 24–48 | 2,046 |
| October 20 | 12:00 p.m. | Central State* | Joe Walton Stadium; Moon Township, PA | NECFR | W 49–45 | 1,176 |
| October 27 | Noon | Saint Francis (PA) | Joe Walton Stadium; Moon Township, PA | NECFR | L 7–20 | 1,359 |
| November 3 | 12:00 p.m. | at Sacred Heart | Campus Field; Fairfield, CT | NECFR | L 7–38 | 1,556 |
| November 10 | 1:00 p.m. | at Eastern Kentucky* | Roy Kidd Stadium; Richmond, KY | ESPN+ | L 39–40 ^{OT} | 4,165 |
| November 17 | 12:00 p.m. | Wagner | Joe Walton Stadium; Moon Township, PA | NECFR | L 7–41 | 1,222 |
*Non-conference game; ^{†}Homecoming; Rankings from STATS Poll released prior to the game; All times are in Eastern time

== Game summaries ==
=== At Dayton ===
| | 1 | 2 | 3 | 4 | Total |
|---|---|---|---|---|---|
| Colonials | 7 | 7 | 7 | 7 | 28 |
| Flyers | 21 | 7 | 14 | 7 | 49 |

=== Virginia State ===
| | 1 | 2 | 3 | 4 | Total |
|---|---|---|---|---|---|
| Trojans | 0 | 6 | 6 | 7 | 19 |
| Colonials | 0 | 7 | 0 | 15 | 22 |

=== At James Madison ===
| | 1 | 2 | 3 | 4 | Total |
|---|---|---|---|---|---|
| Colonials | 0 | 0 | 0 | 7 | 7 |
| No. 2 Dukes | 21 | 31 | 14 | 7 | 73 |

=== At Bryant ===
| | 1 | 2 | 3 | 4 | Total |
|---|---|---|---|---|---|
| Colonials | 0 | 10 | 21 | 15 | 46 |
| Bulldogs | 14 | 14 | 14 | 7 | 49 |

=== Central Connecticut ===
| | 1 | 2 | 3 | 4 | Total |
|---|---|---|---|---|---|
| Blue Devils | 21 | 14 | 7 | 14 | 56 |
| Colonials | 14 | 7 | 14 | 0 | 35 |

=== At Duquesne ===
| | 1 | 2 | 3 | 4 | Total |
|---|---|---|---|---|---|
| Colonials | 7 | 7 | 3 | 7 | 24 |
| Dukes | 7 | 24 | 10 | 7 | 48 |

=== Central State ===
| | 1 | 2 | 3 | 4 | Total |
|---|---|---|---|---|---|
| Marauders | 7 | 12 | 20 | 6 | 45 |
| Colonials | 21 | 7 | 14 | 7 | 49 |

=== Saint Francis (PA) ===
| | 1 | 2 | 3 | 4 | Total |
|---|---|---|---|---|---|
| Red Flash | 0 | 13 | 7 | 0 | 20 |
| Colonials | 0 | 0 | 0 | 7 | 7 |

=== At Sacred Heart ===
| | 1 | 2 | 3 | 4 | Total |
|---|---|---|---|---|---|
| Colonials | 0 | 0 | 7 | 0 | 7 |
| Pioneers | 21 | 14 | 0 | 3 | 38 |

=== At Eastern Kentucky ===
| | 1 | 2 | 3 | 4 | OT | Total |
|---|---|---|---|---|---|---|
| Colonials | 10 | 13 | 0 | 10 | 6 | 39 |
| Colonels | 6 | 10 | 7 | 10 | 7 | 40 |

=== Wagner ===
| | 1 | 2 | 3 | 4 | Total |
|---|---|---|---|---|---|
| Seahawks | 14 | 24 | 3 | 0 | 41 |
| Colonials | 7 | 0 | 0 | 0 | 7 |
