= 2018 Duquesne Dukes football team =

American college football season

2018 Duquesne Dukes football

NEC co-champion

FCS Playoffs Second Round, L 6–51 vs. South Dakota State
- Conference: Northeast Conference

Ranking
- STATS: No. 21
- FCS Coaches: No. 24
- Record: 9–4 (5–1 NEC)
- Head coach: Jerry Schmitt (14th season)
- Offensive coordinator: Anthony Doria
- Defensive coordinator: Dave Opfar
- Home stadium: Arthur J. Rooney Athletic Field

2018 Northeast Conference football standings
	Conf.			Overall
Team	W		L	W		L
No. 21 Duquesne +^	5	–	1	8	–	3
Sacred Heart +	5	–	1	7	–	4
Central Connecticut	4	–	2	6	–	5
Wagner	3	–	3	4	–	7
Saint Francis (PA)	2	–	4	4	–	7
Bryant	2	–	4	6	–	5
Robert Morris	0	–	6	2	–	9
+ – Conference co-champions; ^ – FCS playoff participant; Rankings from STATS Poll

The 2018 Duquesne Dukes football team represented Duquesne University in the 2018 NCAA Division I FCS football season. They were led by 14th-year head coach Jerry Schmitt and played their home games at Arthur J. Rooney Athletic Field. They played as a member of the Northeast Conference. They finished the season 9–4, 5–1 in NEC play to be NEC co-champions with Sacred Heart. Due to their head-to-head win over Sacred Heart, they received the NEC's automatic bid to the FCS Playoffs where they defeated Towson in the first round before losing in the second round to South Dakota State.

== Preseason ==
=== Award watch lists ===
Award	Player	Position	Year
Walter Payton Award	A.J. Hines	RB	JR

=== NEC coaches poll ===
The NEC released their preseason coaches poll on July 24, 2018, with the Dukes predicted to finish in second place.

=== Preseason All-NEC team ===
The Dukes placed five players on the preseason all-NEC team.

Offense

AJ Hines – RB

Nehari Crawford – WR

Alex Conley – OL

Matt Fitzpatrick – OL

Defense

Jonathant Istache – DB

== Schedule ==
Date	Time	Opponent	Site	TV	Result	Attendance
August 25	5:30 p.m.	at UMass*	Warren McGuirk Alumni Stadium; Hadley, MA	ELVN	L 15–63	8,684
September 1	2:00 p.m.	Lock Haven*	Arthur J. Rooney Athletic Field; Pittsburgh, PA	NECFR	W 45–0	1,830
September 8	12:00 p.m.	Valparaiso*	Arthur J. Rooney Athletic Field; Pittsburgh, PA	NECFR	W 23–21	943
September 15	12:00 p.m.	Dayton*	Arthur J. Rooney Athletic Field; Pittsburgh, PA	NECFR	W 31–26	1,534
September 23	12:00 a.m.	at Hawaii*	Aloha Stadium; Honolulu, HI	SPEC HI	L 21–42	26,175
October 6	1:00 p.m.	Bryant^{†}	Arthur J. Rooney Athletic Field; Pittsburgh, PA	NECFR	L 20–21	2,145
October 13	7:00 p.m.	Robert Morris	Arthur J. Rooney Athletic Field; Pittsburgh, PA	ESPN3	W 48–24	2,046
October 20	12:00 p.m.	at Saint Francis (PA)	DeGol Field; Loretto, PA	NECFR	W 27–20	1,532
November 3	12:00 p.m.	at Wagner	Wagner College Stadium; Staten Island, NY	ESPN3	W 47–30	1,942
November 10	12:00 p.m.	Sacred Heart	Arthur J. Rooney Athletic Field; Pittsburgh, PA	NECFR	W 28–24	1,304
November 17	12:00 p.m.	at Central Connecticut	Arute Field; New Britain, CT	NECFR	W 38–31	3,617
November 24	2:00 p.m.	at No. 16 Towson*	Johnny Unitas Stadium; Towson, MD (FCS Playoffs First Round)	ESPN3	W 31–10	2,158
December 1	3:00 p.m.	at No. 5 South Dakota State*	Dana J. Dykhouse Stadium; Brookings, SD (FCS Playoffs Second Round)	ESPN3	L 6–51	3,042
*Non-conference game; ^{†}Homecoming; Rankings from STATS Poll released prior to the game; All times are in Eastern time

- Source: Schedule

== Game summaries ==
=== At UMass ===
	1	2	3	4	Total
Dukes	3	6	0	6	15
Minutemen	21	14	21	7	63

Scoring summary

Quarter	Time	Drive			Team	Scoring information	Score	
Quarter	Time	Plays	Yards	TOP	Team	Scoring information	DUQ	UMass
1	13:57	1	32	0:08	UMass	Brennon Dingle 32-yard touchdown reception from Andrew Ford, Mike Caggiano kick good	0	7
1	11:35	2	77	0:45	UMass	Andy Isabella 60-yard touchdown reception from Ross Comis, Cooper Garcia kick good	0	14
1	6:20	8	87	3:01	UMass	Bilal Ally 1-yard touchdown run, Mike Caggiano kick good	0	21
1	0:50	6	28	2:58	DUQ	32-yard field goal by Mitch MacZura	3	21
2	14:30	5	75	1:20	UMass	Andy Isabella 14-yard touchdown run, Cooper Garcia kick good	3	28
2	3:12	12	62	4:19	UMass	Marquis Young 2-yard touchdown run, Mike Caggiano kick good	3	35
2	0:05	9	66	3:07	DUQ	Nehari Crawford 5-yard touchdown reception from Daniel Parr, 2-point pass failed	9	35
3	12:22	6	54	2:38	UMass	Andy Isabella 44-yard touchdown reception from Andrew Ford, Cooper Garcia kick good	9	42
3	10:09				UMass	Interception returned 60 yards for touchdown by Brice McAlister, Mike Caggiano kick good	9	49
3	3:33	8	81	3:40	UMass	Ross Comis 1-yard touchdown run, Cooper Garcia kick good	9	56
4	10:27	17	71	2:55	DUQ	Daniel Parr 2-yard touchdown run, Mitch MacZura kick failed	15	56
4	7:42	7	87	2:43	UMass	Zak Simon 14-yard touchdown reception from Ross Comis, Mike Caggiano kick good	15	63
"TOP" = time of possession. For other American football terms, see Glossary of American football.							15	63

=== Lock Haven ===
	1	2	3	4	Total
Bald Eagles	0	0	0	0	0
Dukes	14	21	7	3	45

=== Valparaiso ===
	1	2	3	4	Total
Crusaders	0	14	0	7	21
Dukes	7	0	10	6	23

=== Dayton ===
	1	2	3	4	Total
Flyers	6	7	6	7	26
Dukes	14	10	7	0	31

=== At Hawaii ===
	1	2	3	4	Total
Dukes	14	0	0	7	21
Rainbow Warriors	7	14	7	14	42

=== Bryant ===
	1	2	3	4	Total
Bulldogs	7	7	7	0	21
Dukes	7	6	7	0	20

=== Robert Morris ===
	1	2	3	4	Total
Colonials	7	7	3	7	24
Dukes	7	24	10	7	48

=== At Saint Francis (PA) ===
	1	2	3	4	Total
Dukes	0	6	7	14	27
Red Flash	10	3	7	0	20

=== At Wagner ===
	1	2	3	4	Total
Dukes	7	14	6	20	47
Seahawks	6	17	0	7	30

=== Sacred Heart ===
	1	2	3	4	Total
Pioneers	0	7	14	3	24
Dukes	14	7	7	0	28

=== At Central Connecticut ===
	1	2	3	4	Total
Dukes	7	14	7	10	38
Blue Devils	14	3	7	7	31

== FCS Playoffs ==
=== At Towson–First Round ===
	1	2	3	4	Total
Dukes	0	3	14	14	31
No. 16 Tigers	7	3	0	0	10

=== At South Dakota State–Second Round ===
	1	2	3	4	Total
Dukes	0	0	6	0	6
No. 5 Jackrabbits	7	17	20	7	51

== Ranking movements ==
Ranking movements Legend: ██ Increase in ranking ██ Decrease in ranking — = Not ranked RV = Received votes
	Week													
Poll	Pre	1	2	3	4	5	6	7	8	9	10	11	12	Final
STATS FCS	RV	RV	—	—	—	—	—	—	—	—	—	RV	RV	21
Coaches	—	—	—	—	—	—	—	—	—	—	—	RV	RV	24
