= 2018 Stetson Hatters football team =

American college football season

2018 Stetson Hatters football
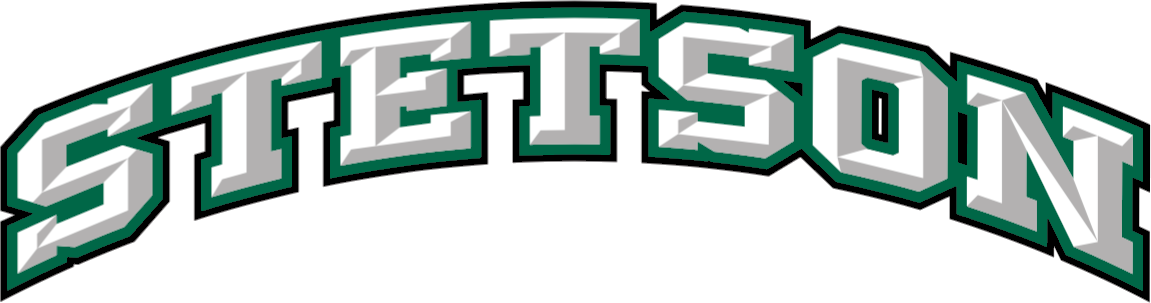
- Conference: Pioneer Football League
- Record: 8–2 (6–2 PFL)
- Head coach: Roger Hughes (6th season)
- Offensive coordinator: Stan Clayton (1st season)
- Defensive coordinator: Brian Young (6th season)
- Home stadium: Spec Martin Stadium

2018 Pioneer Football League standings
	Conf.			Overall
Team	W		L	W		L
No. 25 San Diego $^	8	–	0	9	–	3
Stetson	6	–	2	8	–	2
Drake	6	–	2	7	–	4
Marist	5	–	3	5	–	6
Dayton	5	–	3	6	–	5
Davidson	3	–	5	6	–	5
Butler	2	–	6	4	–	7
Morehead State	2	–	6	3	–	8
Valparaiso	2	–	6	2	–	9
Jacksonville	1	–	7	2	–	8
$ – Conference champion; ^ – FCS playoff participant; Rankings from STATS Poll

The 2018 Stetson Hatters football team represented Stetson University as a member of the Pioneer Football League (PFL) during the 2018 NCAA Division I FCS football season. Led by sixth-year head coach Roger Hughes, the Hatters compiled an overall record of 8–2 with a mark of 6–2 in conference play, tying for second place in the PFL. Stetson played home games at Spec Martin Stadium on DeLand, Florida.

== Schedule ==
Date	Time	Opponent	Site	TV	Result	Attendance
September 1	7:00 p.m.	Point*	Spec Martin Stadium; DeLand, FL	ESPN3	W 48–7	1,632
September 8	6:00 p.m.	Waldorf*	Spec Martin Stadium; DeLand, FL	HV	W 63–34	1,850
September 15	12:00 p.m.	Presbyterian*	Spec Martin Stadium; DeLand, FL	ESPN+	Cancelled (Note: This game was originally scheduled to be played at Presbyterian. It was moved to DeLand in anticipation of Hurricane Florence before being cancelled.)	
September 22	1:00 p.m.	Marist	Spec Martin Stadium; DeLand, FL	ESPN3	W 19–14	1,567
September 29	5:00 p.m.	at San Diego	Torero Stadium; San Diego, CA	Stadium	L 10–49	1,471
October 13	2:00 p.m.	at Drake	Drake Stadium; Des Moines, IA		W 23–21	1,439
October 20	6:00 p.m.	Jacksonville	Spec Martin Stadium; DeLand, FL	ESPN3	W 38–35	2,427
October 27	1:00 p.m.	at Davidson	Richardson Stadium; Davidson, NC		W 56–53	3,992
November 3	1:00 p.m.	Morehead State^{†}	Spec Martin Stadium; DeLand, FL	ESPN3	W 48–24	2,571
November 10	12:00 p.m.	at Butler	Bud and Jackie Sellick Bowl; Indianapolis, IN		L 23–28	2,345
November 17	1:00 p.m.	Valparaiso	Spec Martin Stadium; DeLand, FL	ESPN+	W 45–31	1,961
*Non-conference game; ^{†}Homecoming; All times are in Eastern time

== Preseason ==
=== Preseason All-PFL team ===
The PFL released their preseason all-PFL team on July 30, 2018, with the Hatters having one player selected.

Defense

JJ Henderson – DB

=== Preseason coaches poll ===
The PFL released their preseason coaches poll on July 31, 2018, with the Hatters predicted to finish in ninth place.

== Game summaries ==
=== Point ===
	1	2	3	4	Total
Skyhawks	0	7	0	0	7
Hatters	10	28	7	3	48

=== Waldorf ===
	1	2	3	4	Total
Warriors	7	0	14	13	34
Hatters	28	14	14	7	63

=== Marist ===
	1	2	3	4	Total
Red Foxes	0	7	0	7	14
Hatters	3	10	0	6	19

=== At San Diego ===
	1	2	3	4	Total
Hatters	0	7	3	0	10
Toreros	14	14	14	7	49

=== At Drake ===
	1	2	3	4	Total
Hatters	0	7	10	6	23
Bulldogs	3	0	11	7	21

=== Jacksonville ===
	1	2	3	4	Total
Dolphins	7	7	7	14	35
Hatters	14	7	7	10	38

=== At Davidson ===
	1	2	3	4	Total
Hatters	7	21	21	7	56
Wildcats	10	7	21	15	53

=== Morehead State ===
	1	2	3	4	Total
Eagles	14	3	0	7	24
Hatters	14	13	21	0	48

=== At Butler ===
	1	2	3	4	Total
Hatters	6	10	0	7	23
Bulldogs	7	14	7	0	28

=== Valparaiso ===
	1	2	3	4	Total
Crusaders	7	17	0	7	31
Hatters	7	14	21	3	45
