= 2018 San Diego Toreros football team =

American college football season

2018 San Diego Toreros football

PFL champion

NCAA Division I First Round, L 30–49 vs. Nicholls
- Conference: Pioneer Football League

Ranking
- STATS: No. 25
- FCS Coaches: No. 20
- Record: 9–3 (8–0 PFL)
- Head coach: Dale Lindsey (6th season)
- Co-offensive coordinators: Jim Jackson (1st season); Christian Taylor (1st season)
- Defensive coordinator: Bobby Jay (1st season)
- Home stadium: Torero Stadium

2018 Pioneer Football League standings
	Conf.			Overall
Team	W		L	W		L
No. 25 San Diego $^	8	–	0	9	–	3
Stetson	6	–	2	8	–	2
Drake	6	–	2	7	–	4
Marist	5	–	3	5	–	6
Dayton	5	–	3	6	–	5
Davidson	3	–	5	6	–	5
Butler	2	–	6	4	–	7
Morehead State	2	–	6	3	–	8
Valparaiso	2	–	6	2	–	9
Jacksonville	1	–	7	2	–	8
$ – Conference champion; ^ – FCS playoff participant; Rankings from STATS Poll

The 2018 San Diego Toreros football team represented the University of San Diego as a member of the Pioneer Football League (PFL) during the 2018 NCAA Division I FCS football season. Led by sixth-year head coach Dale Lindsey, the Toreros compiled an overall record of 9–3 with a mark of 8–0 in conference play, winning the PFL title. San Diego earned the conference's automatic bid to the NCAA Division I Football Championship playoffs, where the Toreros lost in the first round to Nicholls. The team played home games at Torero Stadium in San Diego.

== Preseason ==
=== Award watch lists ===
Award	Player	Position	Year
Walter Payton Award	Anthony Lawrence	QB	SR

=== Preseason All-PFL team ===
The PFL released their preseason all-PFL team on July 30, 2018, with the Toreros having four players selected.

Offense

Anthony Lawrence – QB

Zack Nelson – FB

Daniel Cooney – OL

Defense

Connor Spencer – DL

=== Preseason coaches poll ===
The PFL released their preseason coaches poll on July 31, 2018, with the Toreros predicted to finish as PFL champions.

== Schedule ==
Date	Time	Opponent	Rank	Site	TV	Result	Attendance
September 1	2:00 p.m.	Western New Mexico*		Torero Stadium; San Diego, CA	TheW.tv via Stadium	W 38–9	2,023
September 8	7:00 p.m.	at UC Davis*		Aggie Stadium; Davis, CA	Pluto TV	L 21–54	7,305
September 15	9:00 a.m.	at Harvard*		Harvard Stadium; Boston, MA	ESPN+	L 14–36	8,709
September 29	2:00 p.m.	Stetson		Torero Stadium; San Diego, CA	TheW.tv via Stadium	W 49–10	1,471
October 6	9:00 a.m.	at Morehead State		Jayne Stadium; Morehead, KY	ESPN+	W 51–34	5,557
October 13	2:00 p.m.	Dayton^{†}		Torero Stadium; San Diego, CA	TheW.tv via Stadium	W 36–34	2,997
October 20	9:00 a.m.	at Butler		Bud and Jackie Sellick Bowl; Indianapolis, IN	Facebook Live	W 42–13	2,071
October 27	2:00 p.m.	Jacksonville		Torero Stadium; San Diego, CA	TheW.tv via Stadium	W 59–35	1,047
November 3	10:30 a.m.	at Drake		Drake Stadium; Des Moines, IA	Bulldog Vision	W 27–10	1,522
November 10	2:00 p.m.	Davidson		Torero Stadium; San Diego, CA	TheW.tv via Stadium	W 56–52	3,115
November 17	9:00 a.m.	at Marist	No. 21	Tenney Stadium at Leonidoff Field; Poughkeepsie, NY		W 31–14	1,254
November 24	1:00 p.m.	at No. 14 Nicholls*	No. 19	John L. Guidry Stadium; Thibodaux, LA (NCAA Division I First Round)	ESPN3	L 30–49	8,571
*Non-conference game; ^{†}Homecoming; Rankings from STATS Poll released prior to the game; All times are in Pacific time

== Ranking movements ==
Ranking movements Legend: ██ Increase in ranking ██ Decrease in ranking — = Not ranked RV = Received votes
	Week													
Poll	Pre	1	2	3	4	5	6	7	8	9	10	11	12	Final
STATS FCS	RV	RV	RV	—	—	—	—	—	RV	RV	RV	21	19	25
Coaches	RV	RV	RV	—	—	—	—	—	—	RV	RV	22	19	20

== Game summaries ==
=== Western New Mexico ===
	1	2	3	4	Total
Mustangs	0	3	6	0	9
Toreros	21	7	10	0	38

=== At UC Davis ===
	1	2	3	4	Total
Toreros	0	0	21	0	21
Aggies	7	13	7	27	54

=== At Harvard ===
	1	2	3	4	Total
Toreros	3	3	8	0	14
Crimson	27	0	3	6	36

=== Stetson ===
	1	2	3	4	Total
Hatters	0	7	3	0	10
Toreros	14	14	14	7	49

=== At Morehead State ===
	1	2	3	4	Total
Toreros	14	17	13	7	51
Eagles	7	7	12	8	34

=== Dayton ===
	1	2	3	4	Total
Flyers	7	7	7	13	34
Toreros	6	17	0	13	36

=== At Butler ===
	1	2	3	4	Total
Toreros	14	21	7	0	42
Bulldogs	0	0	6	7	13

=== Jacksonville ===
	1	2	3	4	Total
Dolphins	7	7	14	7	35
Toreros	7	21	14	17	59

=== At Drake ===
	1	2	3	4	Total
Toreros	13	7	7	0	27
Bulldogs	0	7	3	0	10

=== Davidson ===
	1	2	3	4	Total
Wildcats	24	14	7	7	52
Toreros	7	28	7	14	56

=== At Marist ===
	1	2	3	4	Total
No. 21 Toreros	10	14	7	0	31
Red Foxes	0	0	7	7	14

=== At Nicholls—NCAA Division I First Round ===
	1	2	3	4	Total
No. 19 Toreros	7	3	13	7	30
No. 14 Colonels	21	14	7	7	49
