= 2018 Morehead State Eagles football team =

American college football season

2018 Morehead State Eagles football
- Conference: Pioneer Football League
- Record: 3–8 (2–6 PFL)
- Head coach: Rob Tenyer (6th season)
- Defensive coordinator: Dovonte Edwards (1st season)
- Home stadium: Jayne Stadium

2018 Pioneer Football League standings
	Conf.			Overall
Team	W		L	W		L
No. 25 San Diego $^	8	–	0	9	–	3
Stetson	6	–	2	8	–	2
Drake	6	–	2	7	–	4
Marist	5	–	3	5	–	6
Dayton	5	–	3	6	–	5
Davidson	3	–	5	6	–	5
Butler	2	–	6	4	–	7
Morehead State	2	–	6	3	–	8
Valparaiso	2	–	6	2	–	9
Jacksonville	1	–	7	2	–	8
$ – Conference champion; ^ – FCS playoff participant; Rankings from STATS Poll

The 2018 Morehead State Eagles football team represented Morehead State University in the 2018 NCAA Division I FCS football season. They were led by sixth-year head coach Rob Tenyer and played their home games at Jayne Stadium. They were members of the Pioneer Football League. They finished the season 3–8, 2–6 in PFL play to finish in a three-way tie for seventh place.

== Preseason ==
=== Preseason All-PFL team ===
The PFL released their preseason all-PFL team on July 30, 2018, with the Eagles having one player selected.

Offense

Jarin Higginbotham – WR

=== Preseason coaches poll ===
The PFL released their preseason coaches poll on July 31, 2018, with the Eagles predicted to finish in eighth place.

== Schedule ==
Date	Time	Opponent	Site	TV	Result	Attendance
August 30	7:00 p.m.	at Eastern Kentucky*	Roy Kidd Stadium; Richmond, KY (Old Hawg Rifle)	ESPN+	L 23–49	10,230
September 8	6:00 p.m.	Mount St. Joseph*	Jayne Stadium; Morehead, KY	ESPN+	W 48–19	3,216
September 15	6:00 p.m.	Austin Peay*	Jayne Stadium; Morehead, KY	ESPN+	L 40–78	5,955
September 29	1:00 p.m.	at Butler	Bud and Jackie Sellick Bowl; Indianapolis, IN	Facebook Live	L 21–24	4,062
October 6	12:00 p.m.	San Diego	Jayne Stadium; Morehead, KY	ESPN+	L 34–51	5,557
October 13	1:00 p.m.	at Davidson	Richardson Stadium; Davidson, NC		W 35–28	3,721
October 20	2:00 p.m.	Valparaiso^{†}	Jayne Stadium; Morehead, KY	ESPN+	W 31–24	8,145
October 27	1:00 p.m.	Marist	Jayne Stadium; Morehead, KY	ESPN+	L 21–48	1,345
November 3	1:00 p.m.	at Stetson	Spec Martin Stadium; DeLand, FL		L 24–48	2,571
November 10	1:00 p.n.	at Dayton	Welcome Stadium; Dayton, OH		L 20–63	2,325
November 17	1:00 p.m.	Drake	Jayne Stadium; Morehead, KY	ESPN+	L 6–43	3,287
*Non-conference game; ^{†}Homecoming; All times are in Eastern time

== Game summaries ==
=== At Eastern Kentucky ===
	1	2	3	4	Total
Eagles	0	7	0	16	23
Colonels	18	0	14	17	49

=== Mount St. Joseph ===
	1	2	3	4	Total
Lions	0	6	13	0	19
Eagles	14	28	0	6	48

=== Austin Peay ===
	1	2	3	4	Total
Governors	22	21	14	21	78
Eagles	14	12	14	0	40

=== At Butler ===
	1	2	3	4	Total
Eagles	7	7	0	7	21
Bulldogs	7	7	7	3	24

=== San Diego ===
	1	2	3	4	Total
Toreros	14	17	13	7	51
Eagles	7	7	12	8	34

=== At Davidson ===
	1	2	3	4	Total
Eagles	14	7	7	7	35
Wildcats	7	14	0	7	28

=== Valparaiso ===
	1	2	3	4	Total
Crusaders	0	7	0	17	24
Eagles	0	21	7	3	31

=== Marist ===
	1	2	3	4	Total
Red Foxes	14	14	13	7	48
Eagles	7	0	7	7	21

=== At Stetson ===
	1	2	3	4	Total
Eagles	14	3	0	7	24
Hatters	14	13	21	0	48

=== At Dayton ===
	1	2	3	4	Total
Eagles	0	13	0	7	20
Flyers	21	21	14	7	63

=== Drake ===
	1	2	3	4	Total
Bulldogs	9	13	7	14	43
Eagles	6	0	0	0	6
