= 2018 Wagner Seahawks football team =

American college football season

2018 Wagner Seahawks football
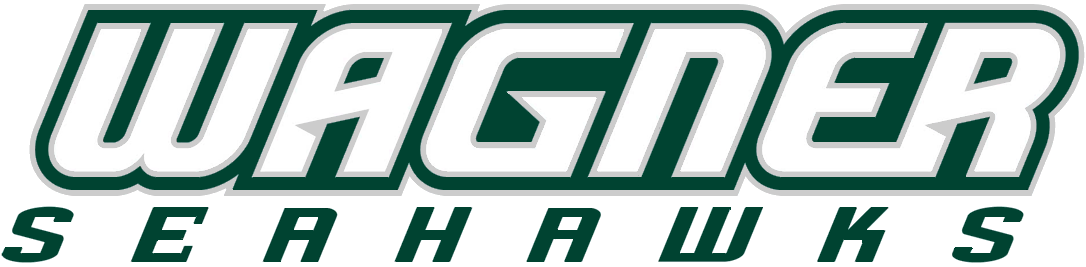
- Conference: Northeast Conference
- Record: 4–7 (3–3 NEC)
- Head coach: Jason Houghtaling (4th season)
- Offensive coordinator: Rob Calabrese (2nd season)
- Defensive coordinator: Tony Brinson (3rd season)
- Home stadium: Wagner College Stadium

2018 Northeast Conference football standings
	Conf.			Overall
Team	W		L	W		L
No. 21 Duquesne +^	5	–	1	8	–	3
Sacred Heart +	5	–	1	7	–	4
Central Connecticut	4	–	2	6	–	5
Wagner	3	–	3	4	–	7
Saint Francis (PA)	2	–	4	4	–	7
Bryant	2	–	4	6	–	5
Robert Morris	0	–	6	2	–	9
+ – Conference co-champions; ^ – FCS playoff participant; Rankings from STATS Poll

The 2018 Wagner Seahawks football team represented Wagner College in the 2018 NCAA Division I FCS football season as a member of the Northeast Conference (NEC). They were led by fourth-year head coach Jason Houghtaling and played their home games at Wagner College Stadium. Wagner finished the season 4–7 overall and 3–3 in NEC play to place fourth.

== Preseason ==
=== NEC coaches poll ===
The NEC released their preseason coaches poll on July 24, 2018, with the Seahawks predicted to finish in fifth place.

=== Preseason All-NEC team ===
The Seahawks placed two players on the preseason all-NEC team.

Offense

Ryan Fulse – RB

Defense

Quintin Hampton – LB

== Schedule ==
Date	Time	Opponent	Site	TV	Result	Attendance
August 30	6:00 p.m.	Bowie State*	Wagner College Stadium; Staten Island, NY	NECFR	W 40–23	2,512
September 8	3:30 p.m.	at Syracuse*	Carrier Dome; Syracuse, NY	ACCN Extra	L 10–62	29,395
September 15	3:00 p.m.	at Montana State*	Bobcat Stadium; Bozeman, MT		L 24–47	18,037
September 22	6:00 p.m.	Sacred Heart^{†}	Wagner College Stadium; Staten Island, NY	NECFR	L 14–41	3,178
September 29	1:00 p.m.	at Monmouth*	Kessler Stadium; West Long Branch, NJ		L 47–54	3,971
October 6	2:00 p.m.	at Campbell*	Barker–Lane Stadium; Buies Creek, NC	ESPN+	L 3–49	5,465
October 13	Noon	Saint Francis (PA)	Wagner College Stadium; Staten Island, NY	ESPN3	W 23–22	1,438
October 27	Noon	at Central Connecticut	Arute Field; New Britain, CT	NECFR	L 24–49	852
November 3	Noon	Duquesne	Wagner College Stadium; Staten Island, NY	ESPN3	L 30–47	1,942
November 10	1:00 p.m.	at Bryant	Beirne Stadium; Smithfield, RI	NECFR	W 52–36	1,652
November 17	Noon	at Robert Morris	Joe Walton Stadium; Moon Township, PA	NECFR	W 41–7	1,222
*Non-conference game; ^{†}Homecoming; All times are in Eastern time

== Game summaries ==
=== Bowie State ===
	1	2	3	4	Total
Bulldogs	3	10	7	3	23
Seahawks	17	14	0	9	40

=== At Syracuse ===
	1	2	3	4	Total
Seahawks	7	0	0	3	10
Orange	21	24	14	3	62

=== At Montana State ===
	1	2	3	4	Total
Seahawks	7	14	3	0	24
Bobcats	14	16	10	7	47

=== Sacred Heart ===
	1	2	3	4	Total
Pioneers	7	21	6	7	41
Seahawks	0	7	7	0	14

=== At Monmouth ===
	1	2	3	4	Total
Seahawks	21	12	7	7	47
Hawks	8	21	3	22	54

=== At Campbell ===
	1	2	3	4	Total
Seahawks	3	0	0	0	3
Fighting Camels	21	14	7	7	49

=== Saint Francis (PA) ===
	1	2	3	4	Total
Red Flash	0	0	7	15	22
Seahawks	3	7	6	7	23

=== At Central Connecticut ===
	1	2	3	4	Total
Seahawks	14	3	7	0	24
Blue Devils	14	7	7	21	49

=== Duquesne ===
	1	2	3	4	Total
Dukes	7	14	6	20	47
Seahawks	6	17	0	7	30

=== At Bryant ===
	1	2	3	4	Total
Seahawks	10	21	14	7	52
Bulldogs	0	14	14	8	36

=== At Robert Morris ===
	1	2	3	4	Total
Seahawks	14	24	3	0	41
Colonials	7	0	0	0	7
