= 2018 Marist Red Foxes football team =

American college football season

2018 Marist Red Foxes football
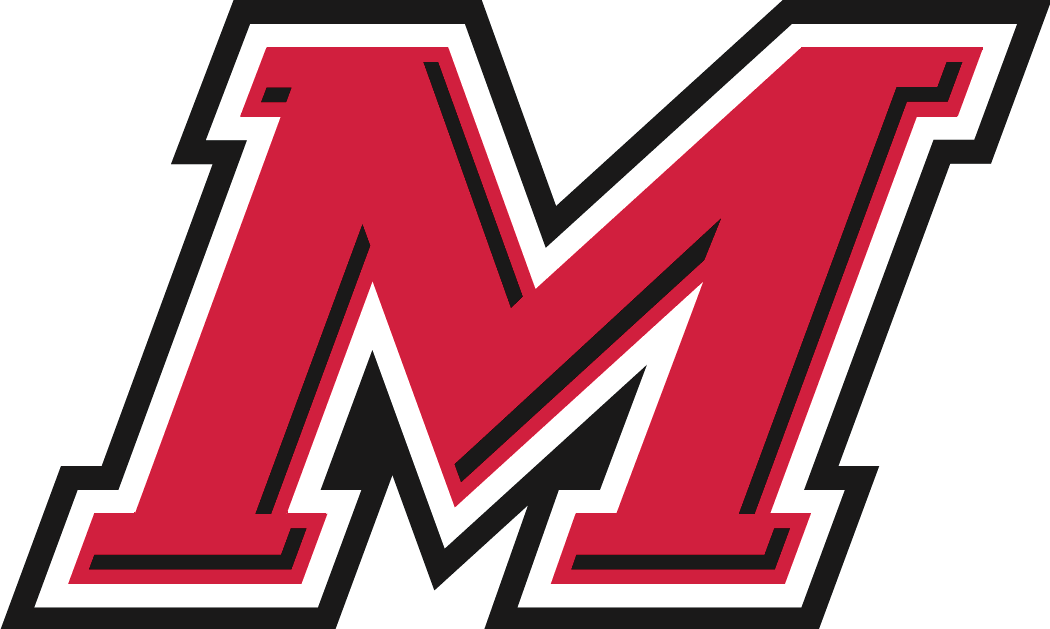
- Conference: Pioneer Football League
- Record: 5–6 (5–3 PFL)
- Head coach: Jim Parady (27th season)
- Offensive coordinator: Marc Bourque (2nd season)
- Defensive coordinator: Scott Rumsey (18th season)
- Home stadium: Tenney Stadium at Leonidoff Field

2018 Pioneer Football League standings
	Conf.			Overall
Team	W		L	W		L
No. 25 San Diego $^	8	–	0	9	–	3
Stetson	6	–	2	8	–	2
Drake	6	–	2	7	–	4
Marist	5	–	3	5	–	6
Dayton	5	–	3	6	–	5
Davidson	3	–	5	6	–	5
Butler	2	–	6	4	–	7
Morehead State	2	–	6	3	–	8
Valparaiso	2	–	6	2	–	9
Jacksonville	1	–	7	2	–	8
$ – Conference champion; ^ – FCS playoff participant; Rankings from STATS Poll

The 2018 Marist Red Foxes football team represented Marist College as a member of the Pioneer Football League (PFL) during the 2018 NCAA Division I FCS football season. Led by 27th-year head coach Jim Parady, the Red Foxes compiled an overall record of 5–6 with a mark of 5–3 in conference play, tying for fourth place in the PFL. Marist played home games at Tenney Stadium at Leonidoff Field in Poughkeepsie, New York.

== Schedule ==
Date	Time	Opponent	Site	TV	Result	Attendance
September 1	1:00 p.m.	Georgetown*	Tenney Stadium at Leonidoff Field; Poughkeepsie, NY		L 14–39	1,904
September 15	6:00 p.m.	at Bryant*	Beirne Stadium; Smithfield, RI		L 27–37	3,673
September 22	1:00 p.m.	at Stetson	Spec Martin Stadium; DeLand, FL		L 14–19	1,567
September 29	1:00 p.m.	Dayton	Tenney Stadium at Leonidoff Field; Poughkeepsie, NY		W 28–17	2,830
October 6	1:00 p.m.	at Columbia*	Robert K. Kraft Field at Lawrence A. Wien Stadium; New York, NY	ESPN+	L 24–34	3,296
October 13	1:00 p.m.	at Jacksonville	D. B. Milne Field; Jacksonville, FL		W 20–17	2,533
October 20	1:00 p.m.	Davidson^{†}	Tenney Stadium at Leonidoff Field; Poughkeepsie, NY		W 48–41 ^{2OT}	1,422
October 27	1:00 p.m.	at Morehead State	Jayne Stadium; Morehead, KY		W 48–21	1,345
November 3	12:00 p.m.	Valparaiso	Tenney Stadium at Leonidoff Field; Poughkeepsie, NY	Red Fox Network	W 35–24	1,227
November 10	2:00 p.m.	at Drake	Drake Stadium; Des Moines, IA		L 10–13	1,348
November 17	12:00 p.m.	No. 21 San Diego	Tenney Stadium at Leonidoff Field; Poughkeepsie, NY		L 14–31	1,254
*Non-conference game; ^{†}Homecoming; Rankings from STATS Poll released prior to the game; All times are in Eastern time

== Preseason ==
=== Preseason All-PFL team ===
The PFL released their preseason all-PFL team on July 30, 2018, with the Red Foxes having four players selected.

Offense

Juston Christian – WR

Defense

Eddie Zinn-Turner – DL

Willie Barrett – LB

Wes Beans – DB

=== Preseason coaches poll ===
The PFL released their preseason coaches poll on July 31, 2018, with the Red Foxes predicted to finish in seventh place.

=== Award watch lists ===
Award	Player	Position	Year
Buck Buchanan Award	Willie Barrett	LB	SR

== Game summaries ==
=== Georgetown ===
	1	2	3	4	Total
Hoyas	11	0	21	7	39
Red Foxes	0	0	7	7	14

=== At Bryant ===
	1	2	3	4	Total
Red Foxes	7	6	7	7	27
Bulldogs	7	10	6	14	37

=== At Stetson ===
	1	2	3	4	Total
Red Foxes	0	7	0	7	14
Hatters	3	10	0	6	19

=== Dayton ===
	1	2	3	4	Total
Flyers	0	7	10	0	17
Red Foxes	7	7	7	7	28

=== At Columbia ===
	1	2	3	4	Total
Red Foxes	0	14	7	3	24
Lions	0	17	14	3	34

=== At Jacksonville ===
	1	2	3	4	Total
Red Foxes	0	0	7	13	20
Dolphins	7	7	3	0	17

=== Davidson ===
	1	2	3	4	OT	2OT	Total
Wildcats	6	21	7	0	7	0	41
Red Foxes	7	10	6	11	7	7	48

=== At Morehead State ===
	1	2	3	4	Total
Red Foxes	14	14	13	7	48
Eagles	7	0	7	7	21

=== Valparaiso ===
	1	2	3	4	Total
Crusaders	3	7	7	7	24
Red Foxes	0	28	0	7	35

=== At Drake ===
	1	2	3	4	Total
Red Foxes	0	0	3	7	10
Bulldogs	3	0	0	10	13

=== San Diego ===
	1	2	3	4	Total
No. 21 Toreros	10	14	7	0	31
Red Foxes	0	0	7	7	14
