= 2018 Butler Bulldogs football team =

American college football season

2018 Butler Bulldogs football
- Conference: Pioneer Football League
- Record: 4–7 (2–6 PFL)
- Head coach: Jeff Voris (13th season)
- Offensive coordinator: Kyle Conner (3rd season)
- Defensive coordinator: Joe Cheshire (9th season)
- Home stadium: Bud and Jackie Sellick Bowl

2018 Pioneer Football League standings
	Conf.			Overall
Team	W		L	W		L
No. 25 San Diego $^	8	–	0	9	–	3
Stetson	6	–	2	8	–	2
Drake	6	–	2	7	–	4
Marist	5	–	3	5	–	6
Dayton	5	–	3	6	–	5
Davidson	3	–	5	6	–	5
Butler	2	–	6	4	–	7
Morehead State	2	–	6	3	–	8
Valparaiso	2	–	6	2	–	9
Jacksonville	1	–	7	2	–	8
$ – Conference champion; ^ – FCS playoff participant; Rankings from STATS Poll

The 2018 Butler Bulldogs football team represented Butler University as a member of the Pioneer Football League (PFL) during the 2018 NCAA Division I FCS football season. Led by 13th-year head coach Jeff Voris, Bulldogs compiled an overall record of 4–7 with a mark of 2–6 in conference play, placing in a three-way tie for seventh in the PFL. Butler played home games at the Bud and Jackie Sellick Bowl in Indianapolis.

== Preseason ==
=== Preseason All-PFL team ===
The PFL released their preseason all-PFL team on July 30, 2018, with the Bulldogs having four players selected.

Offense

Pace Temple – WR

Bobby Jensen – OL

Dakota Sneed – OL

Special teams

Drew Bevalhimer – K

=== Preseason coaches poll ===
The PFL released their preseason coaches poll on July 31, 2018, with the Bulldogs predicted to finish in a tie for fourth place.

== Schedule ==
Date	Time	Opponent	Site	TV	Result	Attendance
September 1	2:00 p.m.	at No. 25 Youngstown State*	Stambaugh Stadium; Youngstown, OH	ESPN+	W 23–21	11,219
September 8	6:00 p.m.	at Taylor*	Turner Stadium; Upland, IN	YouTube	W 31–17	755
September 15	6:00 p.m.	Princeton*	Bud and Jackie Sellick Bowl; Indianapolis, IN	Facebook Live	L 7–50	4,527
September 29	1:00 p.m.	Morehead State^{†}	Bud and Jackie Sellick Bowl; Indianapolis, IN	Facebook Live	W 24–21	4,062
October 6	2:00 p.m.	at Drake	Drake Stadium; Des Moines, IA		L 6–36	3,011
October 13	2:00 p.m.	at Valparaiso	Brown Field; Valparaiso, IN (Hoosier Helmet Trophy)	ESPN+	L 17–35	1,724
October 20	12:00 p.m.	San Diego	Bud and Jackie Sellick Bowl; Indianapolis, IN	Facebook Live	L 13–42	2,071
October 27	1:00 p.m.	Dayton	Bud and Jackie Sellick Bowl; Indianapolis, IN	Facebook Live	L 28–38	1,992
November 3	12:00 p.m.	at Jacksonville	D. B. Milne Field; Jacksonville, FL		L 44–48	1,765
November 10	12:00 p.m.	Stetson	Bud and Jackie Sellick Bowl; Indianapolis, IN	Facebook Live	W 28–23	2,345
November 17	1:00 p.m.	at Davidson	Richardson Stadium; Davidson, NC		L 38–41	3,675
*Non-conference game; ^{†}Homecoming; Rankings from STATS Poll released prior to the game; All times are in Eastern time

== Game summaries ==
=== At Youngstown State ===
	1	2	3	4	Total
Bulldogs	7	0	0	16	23
No. 25 Penguins	7	0	14	0	21

=== At Taylor ===
	1	2	3	4	Total
Bulldogs	0	17	14	0	31
Trojans	0	3	7	7	17

=== Princeton ===
	1	2	3	4	Total
Tigers	17	27	0	6	50
Bulldogs	0	7	0	0	7

=== Morehead State ===
	1	2	3	4	Total
Eagles	7	7	0	7	21
Bulldogs	7	7	7	3	24

=== At Drake ===
	1	2	3	4	Total
BU Bulldogs	0	0	0	6	6
DU Bulldogs	7	7	13	9	36

=== At Valparaiso ===
	1	2	3	4	Total
Bulldogs	0	14	3	0	17
Crusaders	14	0	7	14	35

=== San Diego ===
	1	2	3	4	Total
Toreros	14	21	7	0	42
Bulldogs	0	0	6	7	13

=== Dayton ===
	1	2	3	4	Total
Flyers	14	7	7	10	38
Bulldogs	0	7	6	15	28

=== At Jacksonville ===
	1	2	3	4	Total
Bulldogs	13	14	3	14	44
Dolphins	14	14	7	13	48

=== Stetson ===
	1	2	3	4	Total
Hatters	6	10	0	7	23
Bulldogs	7	14	7	0	28

=== At Davidson ===
	1	2	3	4	Total
Bulldogs	10	10	7	11	38
Wildcats	6	21	7	7	41
