= 2018 Davidson Wildcats football team =

American college football season

2018 Davidson Wildcats football
- Conference: Pioneer Football League
- Record: 6–5 (3–5 PFL)
- Head coach: Scott Abell (1st season)
- Defensive coordinator: Jon Berlin (1st season)
- Home stadium: Richardson Stadium

2018 Pioneer Football League standings
	Conf.			Overall
Team	W		L	W		L
No. 25 San Diego $^	8	–	0	9	–	3
Stetson	6	–	2	8	–	2
Drake	6	–	2	7	–	4
Marist	5	–	3	5	–	6
Dayton	5	–	3	6	–	5
Davidson	3	–	5	6	–	5
Butler	2	–	6	4	–	7
Morehead State	2	–	6	3	–	8
Valparaiso	2	–	6	2	–	9
Jacksonville	1	–	7	2	–	8
$ – Conference champion; ^ – FCS playoff participant; Rankings from STATS Poll

The 2018 Davidson Wildcats football team represented Davidson College in the 2018 NCAA Division I FCS football season. They were led by first-year head coach Scott Abell and played their home games at Richardson Stadium. They were members of the Pioneer Football League (PFL). They finished the season 6–5, 3–5 in PFL play to finish in sixth place. Davidson finished 2018 ranked #1 in the FCS for total offense, averaging 561.9 yards per game.

== Preseason ==
=== Preseason All-PFL team ===
The PFL released their preseason all-PFL team on July 30, 2018, with the Wildcats having one player selected.

Offense

Wesley Dugger – RB

=== Preseason coaches poll ===
The PFL released their preseason coaches poll on July 31, 2018, with the Wildcats predicted to finish in last place.

== Schedule ==
Date	Time	Opponent	Site	TV	Result	Attendance
September 1	7:00 p.m.	Brevard*	Richardson Stadium; Davidson, NC	MI-CONN	W 34–13	4,109
September 8	7:00 p.m.	Chowan*	Richardson Stadium; Davidson, NC	MI-CONN	W 49–28	3,941
September 13 (Note: Originally scheduled for September 15, moved up in anticipation of Hurricane Florence.)	7:00 p.m.	Guilford*^{†}	Richardson Stadium; Davidson, NC	MI-CONN	W 91–61	2,922
September 22	1:00 p.m.	at Dayton	Welcome Stadium; Dayton, OH	Facebook Live	L 21–42	4,700
September 29	1:00 p.m.	at Valparaiso	Brown Field; Valparaiso, IN	ESPN3	W 40–35	4,605
October 6	1:00 p.m.	Jacksonville	Richardson Stadium; Davidson, NC	MI-CONN	W 44–37	3,524
October 13	1:00 p.m.	Morehead State	Richardson Stadium; Davidson, NC	MI-CONN	L 28–35	3,721
October 20	1:00 p.m.	at Marist	Tenney Stadium at Leonidoff Field; Poughkeepsie, NY		L 41–48 ^{2OT}	1,442
October 27	1:00 p.m.	Stetson	Richardson Stadium; Davidson, NC	MI-CONN	L 53–56	3,992
November 10	5:00 p.m.	at San Diego	Torero Stadium; San Diego, CA		L 52–56	3,115
November 17	1:00 p.m.	Butler	Richardson Stadium; Davidson, NC	MI-CONN	W 41–38	3,675
*Non-conference game; ^{†}Homecoming; Rankings from STATS Poll released prior to the game; All times are in Eastern time

- Source: Schedule

== Game summaries ==
=== Brevard ===
	1	2	3	4	Total
Tornados	0	0	6	7	13
Wildcats	13	21	0	0	34

=== Chowan ===
	1	2	3	4	Total
Hawks	7	6	0	15	28
Wildcats	21	21	0	7	49

=== Guilford ===
	1	2	3	4	Total
Quakers	6	20	13	22	61
Wildcats	30	27	14	20	91

=== At Dayton ===
	1	2	3	4	Total
Wildcats	14	0	0	7	21
Flyers	0	14	21	7	42

=== At Valparaiso ===
	1	2	3	4	Total
Wildcats	14	20	0	6	40
Crusaders	14	7	7	7	35

=== Jacksonville ===
	1	2	3	4	Total
Dolphins	6	3	0	28	37
Wildcats	16	7	21	0	44

=== Morehead State ===
	1	2	3	4	Total
Eagles	14	7	7	7	35
Wildcats	7	14	0	7	28

=== At Marist ===
	1	2	3	4	OT	2OT	Total
Wildcats	6	21	7	0	7	0	41
Red Foxes	7	10	6	11	7	7	48

=== Stetson ===
	1	2	3	4	Total
Hatters	7	21	21	7	56
Wildcats	10	7	21	15	53

=== At San Diego ===
	1	2	3	4	Total
Wildcats	24	14	7	7	52
Toreros	7	28	7	14	56

=== Butler ===
	1	2	3	4	Total
Bulldogs	10	10	7	11	38
Wildcats	6	21	7	7	41
