= 2018 Jacksonville Dolphins football team =

American college football season

2018 Jacksonville Dolphins football
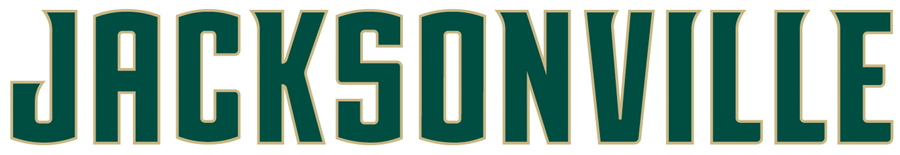
- Conference: Pioneer Football League
- Record: 2–8 (1–7 PFL)
- Head coach: Ian Shields (3rd season)
- Offensive coordinator: Ian Shields (3rd season)
- Defensive coordinator: Alan Darlin (2nd season)
- Home stadium: D. B. Milne Field

2018 Pioneer Football League standings
| | Conf. | | | Overall |
| Team | W | | L | W | | L |
|---|---|---|---|---|---|---|
| No. 25 San Diego $^ | 8 | – | 0 | 9 | – | 3 |
| Stetson | 6 | – | 2 | 8 | – | 2 |
| Drake | 6 | – | 2 | 7 | – | 4 |
| Marist | 5 | – | 3 | 5 | – | 6 |
| Dayton | 5 | – | 3 | 6 | – | 5 |
| Davidson | 3 | – | 5 | 6 | – | 5 |
| Butler | 2 | – | 6 | 4 | – | 7 |
| Morehead State | 2 | – | 6 | 3 | – | 8 |
| Valparaiso | 2 | – | 6 | 2 | – | 9 |
| Jacksonville | 1 | – | 7 | 2 | – | 8 |
$ – Conference champion; ^ – FCS playoff participant; Rankings from STATS Poll

The 2018 Jacksonville Dolphins football team represented Jacksonville University in the 2018 NCAA Division I FCS football season. They were led by third-year head coach Ian Shields and played their home games at D. B. Milne Field. They were members of the Pioneer Football League (PFL). they finished the season 2–8, 1–7 in PFL play to finish in last place.

== Preseason ==
=== Preseason All-PFL team ===
The PFL released their preseason all-PFL team on July 30, 2018, with the Dolphins having two players selected.

Defense

Caysaun Wakeley – LB

Trevor Tufano – LB

=== Preseason coaches poll ===
The PFL released their preseason coaches poll on July 31, 2018, with the Dolphins predicted to finish in sixth place.

== Schedule ==
| Date | Time | Opponent | Site | TV | Result | Attendance |
|---|---|---|---|---|---|---|
| September 1 | 1:00 p.m. | St. Augustine's* | D. B. Milne Field; Jacksonville, FL | ESPN3 | W 63–14 | 2,417 |
| September 8 | 6:00 p.m. | at Mercer* | Five Star Stadium; Macon, GA | ESPN3 | L 3–45 | 10,200 |
| ~~September 15~~ | ~~1:00 p.m.~~ | ~~Walsh~~* | ~~D. B. Milne Field~~; ~~Jacksonville, FL~~ | ~~ESPN3~~ | Cancelled (Note: This game has been cancelled in anticipation of Hurricane Florence.) | |
| September 29 | 1:00 p.m. | Drake | D. B. Milne Field; Jacksonville, FL | ESPN3 | L 9–41 | 1,738 |
| October 6 | 1:00 p.m. | at Davidson | Richardson Stadium; Davidson, NC | | L 37–44 | 3,524 |
| October 13 | 1:00 p.m. | Marist^{†} | D. B. Milne Field; Jacksonville, FL | ESPN3 | L 17–20 | 2,533 |
| October 20 | 1:00 p.m. | at Stetson | Spec Martin Stadium; DeLand, FL | | L 35–38 | 2,427 |
| October 27 | 1:00 p.m. | at San Diego | Torero Stadium; San Diego, CA | | L 35–59 | 1,047 |
| November 3 | 12:00 p.m. | Butler | D. B. Milne Field; Jacksonville, FL | ESPN3 | W 48–44 | 1,765 |
| November 10 | 1:00 p.m. | at Valparaiso | Brown Field; Valparaiso, IN | ESPN+ | L 30–48 | 1,150 |
| November 17 | 1:00 p.m. | Dayton | D. B. Milne Field; Jacksonville, FL | | L 7–34 | 1,492 |
*Non-conference game; ^{†}Homecoming; Rankings from STATS Poll released prior to the game; All times are in Eastern time

- Source: Schedule

== Game summaries ==
=== St. Augustine's ===
| | 1 | 2 | 3 | 4 | Total |
|---|---|---|---|---|---|
| Falcons | 0 | 7 | 0 | 7 | 14 |
| Dolphins | 14 | 21 | 28 | 0 | 63 |

=== At Mercer ===
| | 1 | 2 | 3 | 4 | Total |
|---|---|---|---|---|---|
| Dolphins | 0 | 0 | 0 | 3 | 3 |
| Bears | 7 | 24 | 14 | 0 | 45 |

=== Drake ===
| | 1 | 2 | 3 | 4 | Total |
|---|---|---|---|---|---|
| Bulldogs | 14 | 17 | 0 | 10 | 41 |
| Dolphins | 0 | 0 | 2 | 7 | 9 |

=== At Davidson ===
| | 1 | 2 | 3 | 4 | Total |
|---|---|---|---|---|---|
| Dolphins | 6 | 3 | 0 | 28 | 37 |
| Wildcats | 16 | 7 | 21 | 0 | 44 |

=== Marist ===
| | 1 | 2 | 3 | 4 | Total |
|---|---|---|---|---|---|
| Red Foxes | 0 | 0 | 7 | 13 | 20 |
| Dolphins | 7 | 7 | 3 | 0 | 17 |

=== At Stetson ===
| | 1 | 2 | 3 | 4 | Total |
|---|---|---|---|---|---|
| Dolphins | 7 | 7 | 7 | 14 | 35 |
| Hatters | 14 | 7 | 7 | 10 | 38 |

=== At San Diego ===
| | 1 | 2 | 3 | 4 | Total |
|---|---|---|---|---|---|
| Dolphins | 7 | 7 | 14 | 7 | 35 |
| Toreros | 7 | 21 | 14 | 17 | 59 |

=== Butler ===
| | 1 | 2 | 3 | 4 | Total |
|---|---|---|---|---|---|
| Bulldogs | 13 | 14 | 3 | 14 | 44 |
| Dolphins | 14 | 14 | 7 | 13 | 48 |

=== At Valparaiso ===
| | 1 | 2 | 3 | 4 | Total |
|---|---|---|---|---|---|
| Dolphins | 0 | 10 | 7 | 13 | 30 |
| Crusaders | 14 | 13 | 14 | 7 | 48 |

=== Dayton ===
| | 1 | 2 | 3 | 4 | Total |
|---|---|---|---|---|---|
| Flyers | 3 | 17 | 14 | 0 | 34 |
| Dolphins | 0 | 0 | 0 | 7 | 7 |
